= 2014 FSP Gold River Women's Challenger =

- Date: July 7–13
- Edition: 3rd
- Category: ITF Women's Circuit
- Prize money: $50,000
- Surface: Hard
- Location: Sacramento, California, United States

Champions

Singles
- (Australia) Olivia Rogowska

Doubles
- (Russia) Daria Gavrilova / (Australia) Storm Sanders
← 2013 ·	FSP Gold River Women's Challenger	· 2015 →

The 2014 FSP Gold River Women's Challenger is a professional tennis tournament played on outdoor hard courts. It is the third edition of the tournament which is part of the 2014 ITF Women's Circuit, offering a total of $50,000 in prize money. It takes place in Sacramento, California, United States, on July 7–13, 2014.

== Singles main draw entrants ==
=== Seeds ===
Country	Player	Rank^{1}	Seed
AUS	Olivia Rogowska	128	1
BEL	An-Sophie Mestach	146	2
USA	Madison Brengle	149	3
USA	Nicole Gibbs	150	4
SUI	Romina Oprandi	184	5
USA	Sachia Vickery	186	6
USA	Julia Boserup	222	7
JPN	Nao Hibino	232	8

- ^{1} Rankings as of June 23, 2014

=== Other entrants ===
The following players received wildcards into the singles main draw:

- (United States) Emina Bektas
- (United States) Jessica Lawrence
- (United States) Peggy Porter
- (United States) Zoë Gwen Scandalis

The following players received entry from the qualifying draw:

- (United States) Jennifer Brady
- (United States) Macall Harkins
- (United States) Natalie Pluskota
- (United States) Chanelle Van Nguyen

== Champions ==
=== Singles ===
- (Australia) Olivia Rogowska def. (United States) Julia Boserup 6–2, 7–5

=== Doubles ===
- (Russia) Daria Gavrilova / (Australia) Storm Sanders def. (United States) Maria Sanchez / (United States) Zoë Gwen Scandalis 6–2, 6–1
