= 2014 FSP Gold River Women's Challenger – Doubles =

Doubles
- 2014 FSP Gold River Women's Challenger

Final
- Champions: (Russia) Daria Gavrilova (Australia) Storm Sanders
- Runners-up: (United States) Maria Sanchez (United States) Zoë Gwen Scandalis
- Score: 6–2, 6–1

Events
Singles	Doubles
← 2013 ·	FSP Gold River Women's Challenger	· 2015 →

Naomi Broady and Storm Sanders were the defending champions, having won the event in 2013, but Broady chose not to participate. Sanders partnered with Daria Gavrilova and successfully defended her title, defeating Maria Sanchez and Zoë Gwen Scandalis in the final, 6–2, 6–1.

== Seeds ==
1. (United States) Sanaz Marand / (United States) Asia Muhammad (first round)
2. (United States) Natalie Pluskota / (United States) Keri Wong (quarterfinals)
3. (United States) Jacqueline Cako / (United States) Danielle Lao (semifinals)
4. (Brazil) Laura Pigossi / (Russia) Marina Shamayko (first round)

== Draw ==
=== Key ===
- Q = Qualifier
- WC = Wild card
- LL = Lucky loser
- Alt = Alternate
- SE = Special exempt
- PR = Protected ranking
- ITF = ITF entry
- JE = Junior exempt
- w/o = Walkover
- r = Retired
- d = Defaulted
- SR = Special ranking

First round
1	(United States) S Marand (United States) A Muhammad	5	1
(United States) S Crawford (United States) S Vickery	7	6
(Russia) D Gavrilova (Australia) S Sanders	6	6
WC	(United States) K Chen (United States) A Miller	3	1
3	(United States) J Cako (United States) D Lao	3	7^{8}	[10]
(Chinese Taipei) C-w Hsu (Japan) A Okuno	6	6^{6}	[8]
WC	(United States) E Bektas (United States) J Brady
WC	(United States) J Lawrence (Moldova) A Soltanici	w/o
(United States) J Loeb (United States) A Will	3	6	[10]
(United States) J Boserup (United States) M Brengle	6	2	[3]
(United States) M Sanchez (United States) ZG Scandalis	7	6
4	(Brazil) L Pigossi (Russia) M Shamayko	5	0
(United States) M Harkins (United States) P Porter	6	6
(United States) A-L Jeukeng (United States) C Scholl	4	3
(United States) A Bhargava (United States) D Muresan	1	4
2	(United States) N Pluskota (United States) K Wong	6	6

Quarterfinals
(United States) S Crawford (United States) S Vickery	3	3
(Russia) D Gavrilova (Australia) S Sanders	6	6
3	(United States) J Cako (United States) D Lao	6	6
WC	(United States) J Lawrence (Moldova) A Soltanici	2	3
(United States) J Loeb (United States) A Will
(United States) M Sanchez (United States) ZG Scandalis	w/o
(United States) M Harkins (United States) P Porter	6	5	[10]
2	(United States) N Pluskota (United States) K Wong	3	7	[7]

Semifinals
(Russia) D Gavrilova (Australia) S Sanders	6	7^{8}
3	(United States) J Cako (United States) D Lao	2	6^{6}
(United States) M Sanchez (United States) ZG Scandalis	6^{2}	6	[10]
(United States) M Harkins (United States) P Porter	7^{7}	2	[7]

Final
(Russia) D Gavrilova (Australia) S Sanders	6	6
(United States) M Sanchez (United States) ZG Scandalis	2	1
