= 2013 FSP Gold River Women's Challenger – Doubles =

Doubles
- 2013 FSP Gold River Women's Challenger

Final
- Champions: (United Kingdom) Naomi Broady (Australia) Storm Sanders
- Runners-up: (United States) Robin Anderson (United States) Lauren Embree
- Score: 6–3, 6–4

Events
Singles	Doubles
← 2012 ·	FSP Gold River Women's Challenger	· 2014 →

Asia Muhammad and Yasmin Schnack were the defending champions, having won the event in 2012, but both decided not to defend the title together as a team. Muhammad partnered up with Maria Sanchez as the first seeds whilst Schnack received a wildcard with Kelly Wilson. Schnack and Wilson lost in the first round; Muhammad and Schnack lost in the quarterfinals.

Naomi Broady and Storm Sanders won the title, defeating Robin Anderson and Lauren Embree in the final, 6–3, 6–4.

== Seeds ==
1. (United States) Asia Muhammad / (United States) Maria Sanchez (quarterfinals)
2. (United States) Jacqueline Cako / (United States) Natalie Pluskota (semifinals)
3. (France) Julie Coin / (United States) Keri Wong (first round)
4. (South Africa) Chanel Simmonds / (United Kingdom) Emily Webley-Smith (first round)

== Draw ==
=== Key ===
- Q = Qualifier
- WC = Wild card
- LL = Lucky loser
- Alt = Alternate
- SE = Special exempt
- PR = Protected ranking
- ITF = ITF entry
- JE = Junior exempt
- w/o = Walkover
- r = Retired
- d = Defaulted
- SR = Special ranking

First round
1	(United States) A Muhammad (United States) M Sanchez	6	6
(United States) S Marand (United States) A Weinhold	3	4
(United States) M Harkins (United States) ZG Scandalis	6	3	[10]
(New Zealand) D Hollands (United States) K Pooler	1	6	[8]
3	(France) J Coin (United States) K Wong	5	3
WC	(United States) R Anderson (United States) L Embree	7	6
(United States) E Lumpkin (Australia) S Peers	6	6
Alt	(United States) D Ospina (United States) M Weatherholt	2	2
WC	(United States) Y Schnack (United States) K Wilson	6	0	[8]
(United Kingdom) N Broady (Australia) S Sanders	3	6	[10]
(United States) J Abaza (United States) A Will	6	7
4	(South Africa) C Simmonds (United Kingdom) E Webley-Smith	2	5
(United States) B Austin (United States) N Robinson	2	6	[5]
(United States) M Brengle (United States) K Frilling	6	1	[10]
(United States) A Bhargava (Japan) M Hibi	2	4
2	(United States) J Cako (United States) N Pluskota	6	6

Quarterfinals
1	(United States) A Muhammad (United States) M Sanchez	4	6	[5]
(United States) M Harkins (United States) ZG Scandalis	6	2	[10]
WC	(United States) R Anderson (United States) L Embree	4	6	[10]
(United States) E Lumpkin (Australia) S Peers	6	2	[5]
(United Kingdom) N Broady (Australia) S Sanders	6	7^{7}
(United States) J Abaza (United States) A Will	3	6^{3}
(United States) M Brengle (United States) K Frilling	6^{4}	1
2	(United States) J Cako (United States) N Pluskota	7^{7}	6

Semifinals
(United States) M Harkins (United States) ZG Scandalis	2	1
WC	(United States) R Anderson (United States) L Embree	6	6
(United Kingdom) N Broady (Australia) S Sanders	6	6
2	(United States) J Cako (United States) N Pluskota	4	4

Final
WC	(United States) R Anderson (United States) L Embree	3	4
(United Kingdom) N Broady (Australia) S Sanders	6	6
