= 2014 FSP Gold River Women's Challenger – Singles =

Singles
- 2014 FSP Gold River Women's Challenger

Final
- Champion: (Australia) Olivia Rogowska
- Runner-up: (United States) Julia Boserup
- Score: 6–2, 7–5

Events
Singles	Doubles
← 2013 ·	FSP Gold River Women's Challenger	· 2015 →

Mayo Hibi was the defending champion, having won the event in 2013, but chose to participate at Gatineau instead.

Top seed Olivia Rogowska won the title, defeating seventh seed Julia Boserup in the final, 6–2, 7–5.

== Seeds ==
1. (Australia) Olivia Rogowska (champion)
2. (Belgium) An-Sophie Mestach (second round)
3. (United States) Madison Brengle (semifinals)
4. (United States) Nicole Gibbs (second round)
5. (Switzerland) Romina Oprandi (first round)
6. (United States) Sachia Vickery (quarterfinals)
7. (United States) Julia Boserup (final)
8. (Japan) Nao Hibino (semifinals)

== Main draw ==
=== Key ===
- Q = Qualifier
- WC = Wild card
- LL = Lucky loser
- Alt = Alternate
- SE = Special exempt
- PR = Protected ranking
- ITF = ITF entry
- JE = Junior exempt
- w/o = Walkover
- r = Retired
- d = Defaulted
- SR = Special ranking

=== Finals ===
Semifinals
1	(Australia) Olivia Rogowska	4	6	6
3	(United States) Madison Brengle	6	2	2
7	(United States) Julia Boserup	6	6
8	(Japan) Nao Hibino	1	3

Final
1	(Australia) Olivia Rogowska	6	7
7	(United States) Julia Boserup	2	5

=== Top half ===
First round
1	(Australia) O Rogowska	6	6
Q	(United States) M Harkins	4	2
(Russia) M Shamayko	4	4
WC	(United States) P Porter	6	6
(United States) A Muhammad	6	4	0
(United States) C Scholl	2	6	6
(United States) S Marand	6^{2}	4
6	(United States) S Vickery	7^{7}	6
3	(United States) M Brengle	6	6
(United States) M Sanchez	3	0
(Australia) S Sanders	7^{11}	6^{1}	6
(United States) D Muresan	6^{9}	7^{7}	1
Q	(United States) N Pluskota	2	4
(United States) D Lao	6	6
(United States) S Crawford	6	6
5	(Switzerland) R Oprandi	3	3

Second round
1	(Australia) O Rogowska	7^{7}	6
WC	(United States) P Porter	6^{5}	3
(United States) C Scholl	1	0
6	(United States) S Vickery	6	6
3	(United States) M Brengle	7	6
(Australia) S Sanders	5	1
(United States) D Lao	6	6
(United States) S Crawford	4	1

Quarterfinals
1	(Australia) O Rogowska	2	7^{7}	6
6	(United States) S Vickery	6	6^{4}	4
3	(United States) M Brengle	6	6^{9}	6
(United States) D Lao	4	7^{11}	3

Semifinals
1	(Australia) O Rogowska	4	6	6
3	(United States) M Brengle	6	2	2

=== Bottom half ===
First round
7	(United States) J Boserup	6	6
WC	(United States) ZG Scandalis	1	1
(United States) J Elie	6^{5}	6	6
Q	(United States) C Van Nguyen	7^{7}	3	4
(United States) L Chirico	6	6
Q	(United States) J Brady	3	3
(United States) A Stevenson	3	2
4	(United States) N Gibbs	6	6
8	(Japan) N Hibino	6	6
WC	(United States) E Bektas	2	3
(Brazil) L Pigossi	6	4	6
(United States) T Kinard	4	6	4
(United States) J Loeb	7	6
WC	(United States) J Lawrence	5	1
(United States) A Will	7^{7}	1	3
2	(Belgium) A-S Mestach	6^{4}	6	6

Second round
7	(United States) J Boserup	7	6
(United States) J Elie	5	2
(United States) L Chirico	7^{7}	4	6
4	(United States) N Gibbs	6^{2}	6	1
8	(Japan) N Hibino	6	6
(Brazil) L Pigossi	1	2
(United States) J Loeb	6	6
2	(Belgium) A-S Mestach	1	2

Quarterfinals
7	(United States) J Boserup	7	6
(United States) L Chirico	5	3
8	(Japan) N Hibino	4	6	6
(United States) J Loeb	6	3	4

Semifinals
7	(United States) J Boserup	6	6
8	(Japan) N Hibino	1	3
