= 2015 FSP Gold River Women's Challenger – Singles =

Singles
- 2015 FSP Gold River Women's Challenger

Final
- Champion: (Ukraine) Anhelina Kalinina
- Runner-up: (Belgium) An-Sophie Mestach
- Score: 4–6, 6–4, 6–3

Events
| Singles | Doubles |
| ← 2014 · | FSP Gold River Women's Challenger | · 2016 → |

Olivia Rogowska was the defending champion, but decided to participate in Granby instead.

Anhelina Kalinina won the title, defeating An-Sophie Mestach in the final, 4–6, 6–4, 6–3.

== Seeds ==
1. (Belgium) An-Sophie Mestach (final)
2. (Japan) Eri Hozumi (second round)
3. (United States) Catherine Bellis (quarterfinals)
4. (Japan) Nao Hibino (semifinals)
5. (United States) Jennifer Brady (second round)
6. (Japan) Mayo Hibi (quarterfinals)
7. (Japan) Kimiko Date-Krumm (quarterfinals; retired)
8. (Ukraine) Anhelina Kalinina (champion)

== Main draw ==
=== Key ===
- Q = Qualifier
- WC = Wild card
- LL = Lucky loser
- Alt = Alternate
- SE = Special exempt
- PR = Protected ranking
- ITF = ITF entry
- JE = Junior exempt
- w/o = Walkover
- r = Retired
- d = Defaulted
- SR = Special ranking

=== Finals ===
Semifinals
1 | (Belgium) An-Sophie Mestach | 7 | 6
4 | (Japan) Nao Hibino | 5 | 4
8 | (Ukraine) Anhelina Kalinina | 7 | 6
WC | (United States) Brooke Austin | 5 | 1

Final
1 | (Belgium) An-Sophie Mestach | 6 | 4 | 3
8 | (Ukraine) Anhelina Kalinina | 4 | 6 | 6

=== Top half ===
First round
1 | (Belgium) A-S Mestach | 6 | 6
(United States) M Oudin | 4 | 4
(United States) J Abaza | 6 | 6
(United States) J Boserup | 3 | 3
Q | (United States) A Weinhold | 6 | 6
Q | (Japan) M Osaka | 4 | 2
Q | (United States) N Frenkel | 3 | 3
6 | (Japan) M Hibi | 6 | 6
4 | (Japan) N Hibino | 6 | 6
(United States) S Marand | 2 | 3
(United States) K Ahn | 7 | 6
(South Africa) C Simmonds | 5 | 2
WC | (United States) J Loeb | 6 | 6
LL | (United States) K Chen | 3 | 4
(United States) J Pegula | 6 | 4 | 2
7 | (Japan) K Date-Krumm | 1 | 6 | 6

Second round
1 | (Belgium) A-S Mestach | 6 | 6
(United States) J Abaza | 3 | 0
Q | (United States) A Weinhold | 3 | 6 | 2
6 | (Japan) M Hibi | 6 | 2 | 6
4 | (Japan) N Hibino | 2 | 6 | 6
(United States) K Ahn | 6 | 3 | 0
WC | (United States) J Loeb | 3 | 5
7 | (Japan) K Date-Krumm | 6 | 7

Quarterfinals
1 | (Belgium) A-S Mestach | 6 | 6
6 | (Japan) M Hibi | 4 | 1
4 | (Japan) N Hibino | 6 | 4
7 | (Japan) K Date-Krumm | 3 | 1^{r}

Semifinals
1 | (Belgium) A-S Mestach | 7 | 6
4 | (Japan) N Hibino | 5 | 4

=== Bottom half ===
First round
8 | (Ukraine) A Kalinina | 7^{7} | 6
(United States) S Crawford | 6^{4} | 1
(Serbia) J Jakšić | 6 | 6
(France) M Arcangioli | 2 | 4
(United States) A Muhammad | 6 | 6
(United Kingdom) N Cavaday | 2 | 2
WC | (United States) KK Vyrlan | 4 | 1
3 | (United States) C Bellis | 6 | 6
5 | (United States) J Brady | 7^{9} | 5 | 6
(France) C de Bernardi | 6^{7} | 7 | 4
WC | (United States) R Anderson | 6 | 6
(United States) L Embree | 2 | 4
WC | (United States) B Austin | 6 | 6
Q | (United States) M Gordon | 2 | 4
(United States) C Whoriskey | 4 | 2
2 | (Japan) E Hozumi | 6 | 6

Second round
8 | (Ukraine) A Kalinina | 6 | 6
(Serbia) J Jakšić | 4 | 2
(United States) A Muhammad | 6 | 1 | 1
3 | (United States) C Bellis | 2 | 6 | 6
5 | (United States) J Brady | 3 | 2
WC | (United States) R Anderson | 6 | 6
WC | (United States) B Austin | 7 | 6
2 | (Japan) E Hozumi | 5 | 2

Quarterfinals
8 | (Ukraine) A Kalinina | 6 | 5 | 6
3 | (United States) C Bellis | 3 | 7 | 1
WC | (United States) R Anderson | 6 | 4 | 1
WC | (United States) B Austin | 2 | 6 | 6

Semifinals
8 | (Ukraine) A Kalinina | 7 | 6
WC | (United States) B Austin | 5 | 1
