= 2016 FSP Gold River Women's Challenger =

Tennis tournament

- Date: 18–24 July
- Edition: 5th
- Category: ITF Women's Circuit
- Prize money: $50,000
- Surface: Hard
- Location: Sacramento, California, United States

Champions

Singles
- (United States) Sofia Kenin

Doubles
- (United States) Ashley Weinhold / (United States) Caitlin Whoriskey
← 2015 ·	FSP Gold River Women's Challenger	· 2017 →

The 2016 FSP Gold River Women's Challenger was a professional tennis tournament played on outdoor hard courts. It was the fifth edition of the tournament and part of the 2016 ITF Women's Circuit, offering a total of $50,000 in prize money. It took place in Sacramento, California, United States, on 18–24 July 2016.

== Singles main draw entrants ==
=== Seeds ===
Country	Player	Rank^{1}	Seed
BEL	Alison Van Uytvanck	125	1
USA	Grace Min	160	2
BEL	An-Sophie Mestach	165	3
USA	Robin Anderson	189	4
SRB	Jovana Jakšić	191	5
GBR	Tara Moore	196	6
JPN	Mayo Hibi	199	7
UZB	Sabina Sharipova	206	8

- ^{1} Rankings as of 11 July 2016.

=== Other entrants ===
The following player received a wildcard into the singles main draw:

- (United States) Claire Liu
- (United States) Ellie Halbauer
- (United States) Sabrina Santamaria
- (United States) Karina Vyrlan

The following players received entry from the qualifying draw:

- (Australia) Lizette Cabrera
- (South Africa) Chanel Simmonds
- (Russia) Valeria Solovyeva
- (United States) Alexandra Stevenson

The following player received entry by a lucky loser spot:

- (France) Caroline Roméo

== Champions ==
=== Singles ===
- (United States) Sofia Kenin def. (United States) Grace Min, 4–6, 6–1, 6–4

=== Doubles ===
- (United States) Ashley Weinhold / (United States) Caitlin Whoriskey def. (United States) Jamie Loeb / (South Africa) Chanel Simmonds, 6–4, 6–4
