= 2015 FSP Gold River Women's Challenger =

- Date: 20–26 July
- Edition: 4th
- Category: ITF Women's Circuit
- Prize money: $50,000
- Surface: Hard
- Location: Sacramento, United States

Champions

Singles
- (Ukraine) Anhelina Kalinina

Doubles
- (United States) Ashley Weinhold / (United States) Caitlin Whoriskey
← 2014 ·	FSP Gold River Women's Challenger	· 2016 →

The 2015 FSP Gold River Women's Challenger is a professional tennis tournament played on outdoor hard courts. It is the fourth edition of the tournament and part of the 2015 ITF Women's Circuit, offering a total of $50,000 in prize money. It takes place in Sacramento, United States, on 20–26 July 2015.

== Singles main draw entrants ==
=== Seeds ===
Country	Player	Rank^{1}	Seed
BEL	An-Sophie Mestach	111	1
JPN	Eri Hozumi	161	2
USA	Catherine Bellis	167	3
JPN	Nao Hibino	173	4
USA	Jennifer Brady	180	5
JPN	Mayo Hibi	185	6
JPN	Kimiko Date-Krumm	198	7
UKR	Anhelina Kalinina	201	8

- ^{1} Rankings as of 13 July 2015

=== Other entrants ===
The following players received wildcards into the singles main draw:

- (United States) Robin Anderson
- (United States) Brooke Austin
- (United States) Jamie Loeb
- (United States) Karina Kristina Vyrlan

The following players received entry from the qualifying draw:

- (United States) Nicole Frenkel
- (United States) Michaela Gordon
- (Japan) Mari Osaka
- (United States) Ashley Weinhold

The following player received entry by a lucky loser spot:

- (United States) Kelly Chen

== Champions ==
=== Singles ===
- (Ukraine) Anhelina Kalinina def. (Belgium) An-Sophie Mestach, 4–6, 6–4, 6–3

=== Doubles ===
- (United States) Ashley Weinhold / (United States) Caitlin Whoriskey def. (Japan) Nao Hibino / (Canada) Rosie Johanson, 6–4, 3–6, [14–12]
