= 2011 Mercury Insurance Open – Singles qualifying =

This article displays the qualifying draw of the 2011 Mercury Insurance Open.

== Players ==
=== Seeds ===
1. (Hungary) Gréta Arn (qualified)
2. (New Zealand) Marina Erakovic (qualified)
3. (United States) Jill Craybas (qualified)
4. (Ukraine) Olga Savchuk (lucky loser)
5. (Chinese Taipei) Chang Kai-chen (first round)
6. (Japan) Rika Fujiwara (qualified)
7. (France) Kristina Mladenovic (first round)
8. (United States) Ashley Weinhold (qualified)
9. (United States) Ahsha Rolle (first round)
10. (United States) Alexandra Stevenson (first round)
11. (United States) Julia Boserup (first round)
12. (Russia) Elena Bovina (qualifying competition)
13. (Russia) Olga Puchkova (qualifying competition)
14. (Croatia) Jelena Pandžić (qualifying competition)
15. (United States) Abigail Spears (qualifying competition)
16. (Australia) Tammi Patterson (first round)

=== Qualifiers ===
1. (Hungary) Gréta Arn
2. (New Zealand) Marina Erakovic
3. (United States) Jill Craybas
4. (South Africa) Natalie Grandin
5. (United States) Zoë Gwen Scandalis
6. (Japan) Rika Fujiwara
7. (Canada) Marie-Ève Pelletier
8. (United States) Ashley Weinhold

== Qualifying draw ==
=== First qualifier ===
First round
1 | (Hungary) Gréta Arn | 6 | 6
WC | (France) Sophie Lefevre | 0 | 1
WC | (Mexico) Nazari Urbina | 0 | 6 | 2
15 | (United States) Abigail Spears | 6 | 4 | 6

Qualifying competition
1 | (Hungary) Gréta Arn | 6 | 6
15 | (United States) Abigail Spears | 3 | 4

=== Second qualifier ===
First round
2 | (New Zealand) Marina Erakovic | 6 | 6
WC | (United States) Brooke Austin | 3 | 3
WC | (United States) Stacy Tan | 4 | 0
12 | (Russia) Elena Bovina | 6 | 6

Qualifying competition
2 | (New Zealand) Marina Erakovic | 4 | 7^{7} | 6
12 | (Russia) Elena Bovina | 6 | 6^{4} | 0

=== Third qualifier ===
First round
3 | (United States) Jill Craybas | 6 | 6
WC | (Germany) Kim Grajdek | 2 | 3
WC | (United States) Amelia Herring | 3 | 1
14 | (Croatia) Jelena Pandžić | 6 | 6

Qualifying competition
3 | (United States) Jill Craybas | 7^{7} | 6
14 | (Croatia) Jelena Pandžić | 6^{2} | 1

=== Fourth qualifier ===
First round
4 | (Ukraine) Olga Savchuk | 6 | 6
WC | (Poland) Alicja Rosolska | 1 | 2
WC | (South Africa) Natalie Grandin | 6 | 3 | 7^{7}
10 | (United States) Alexandra Stevenson | 4 | 6 | 6^{3}

Qualifying competition
4 | (Ukraine) Olga Savchuk | 3 | 6 | 3
WC | (South Africa) Natalie Grandin | 6 | 4 | 6

=== Fifth qualifier ===
First round
5 | (Chinese Taipei) Chang Kai-chen | 5 | 1
WC | (United States) Zoë Gwen Scandalis | 7 | 6
WC | (Poland) Klaudia Jans-Ignacik | 7^{7} | 6^{4} | 6
11 | (United States) Julia Boserup | 6^{4} | 7^{7} | 1

Qualifying competition
WC | (United States) Zoë Gwen Scandalis | 5 | 7^{7} | 6
WC | (Poland) Klaudia Jans-Ignacik | 7 | 6^{4} | 4

=== Sixth qualifier ===
First round
6 | (Japan) Rika Fujiwara | 6 | 6
WC | (United States) Gabrielle Desimone | 2 | 1
WC | (United States) Jessica Pegula | 6 | 6
16 | (Australia) Tammi Patterson | 4 | 1

Qualifying competition
6 | (Japan) Rika Fujiwara | 6 | 6
WC | (United States) Jessica Pegula | 2 | 4

=== Seventh qualifier ===
First round
7 | (France) Kristina Mladenovic | 6 | 2 | 1
WC | (Canada) Marie-Ève Pelletier | 4 | 6 | 6
WC | (United States) Mashona Washington | 6 | 6
9 | (United States) Ahsha Rolle | 4 | 2

Qualifying competition
WC | (Canada) Marie-Ève Pelletier | 2 | 7 | 6
WC | (United States) Mashona Washington | 6 | 5 | 1

=== Eighth qualifier ===
First round
8 | (United States) Ashley Weinhold | 6 | 6
WC | (Russia) Maria Kondratieva | 1 | 4
WC | (Czech Republic) Vladimíra Uhlířová | 6 | 1 | 3
13 | (Russia) Olga Puchkova | 3 | 6 | 6

Qualifying competition
8 | (United States) Ashley Weinhold | 4 | 6 | 6
13 | (Russia) Olga Puchkova | 6 | 2 | 0
