= 2015 FSP Gold River Women's Challenger – Doubles =

Doubles
- 2015 FSP Gold River Women's Challenger

Final
- Champions: (United States) Ashley Weinhold (United States) Caitlin Whoriskey
- Runners-up: (Japan) Nao Hibino (Canada) Rosie Johanson
- Score: 6–4, 3–6, [14–12]

Events
Singles	Doubles
← 2014 ·	FSP Gold River Women's Challenger	· 2016 →

Daria Gavrilova and Storm Sanders were the defending champions, but Gavrilova chose to participate at İstanbul and Sanders chose to participate at Granby instead.

Ashley Weinhold and Caitlin Whoriskey won the title, defeating Nao Hibino and Rosie Johanson in the final, 6–4, 3–6, [14–12].

== Seeds ==
1. (Japan) Eri Hozumi / (Belgium) An-Sophie Mestach (semifinals)
2. (United States) Samantha Crawford / (United States) Asia Muhammad (first round)
3. (United States) Jan Abaza / (United States) Melanie Oudin (first round; withdrew)
4. (United States) Jamie Loeb / (United States) Sanaz Marand (first round)

== Draw ==
=== Key ===
- Q = Qualifier
- WC = Wild card
- LL = Lucky loser
- Alt = Alternate
- SE = Special exempt
- PR = Protected ranking
- ITF = ITF entry
- JE = Junior exempt
- w/o = Walkover
- r = Retired
- d = Defaulted
- SR = Special ranking

First round
1	(Japan) E Hozumi (Belgium) A-S Mestach	6	6
(France) M Arcangioli (France) C de Bernardi	3	2
WC	(United States) UM Arconada (United States) K McKenzie	7^{7}	1	[8]
(Serbia) J Jakšić (Ukraine) A Kalinina	6^{5}	6	[10]
3	(United States) J Abaza (United States) M Oudin
(United States) A Weinhold (United States) C Whoriskey	w/o
(United States) A Facey (United States) K Facey	7	1	[10]
WC	(United States) J Taggart (United States) KK Vyrlan	5	6	[6]
(United States) J Cako (South Africa) C Simmonds	6	3	[6]
(United States) R Anderson (United States) M Manasse	4	6	[10]
(Japan) M Hibi (United States) J Pegula	7^{7}	6
4	(United States) J Loeb (United States) S Marand	6^{4}	1
(United States) C Bellis (United States) R Valdes	6	2	[8]
(Japan) N Hibino (Canada) R Johanson	3	6	[10]
(United Kingdom) N Cavaday (United States) A Stevenson	7^{7}	4	[12]
2	(United States) S Crawford (United States) A Muhammad	6^{5}	6	[10]

Quarterfinals
1	(Japan) E Hozumi (Belgium) A-S Mestach	3	6	[10]
(Serbia) J Jakšić (Ukraine) A Kalinina	6	0	[5]
(United States) A Weinhold (United States) C Whoriskey	6	6
(United States) A Facey (United States) K Facey	1	2
(United States) R Anderson (United States) M Manasse	w/o
(Japan) M Hibi (United States) J Pegula
(Japan) N Hibino (Canada) R Johanson	6	6
(United Kingdom) N Cavaday (United States) A Stevenson	1	3

Semifinals
1	(Japan) E Hozumi (Belgium) A-S Mestach	4	2
(United States) A Weinhold (United States) C Whoriskey	6	6
(United States) R Anderson (United States) M Manasse	6^{3}	3
(Japan) N Hibino (Canada) R Johanson	7^{7}	6

Final
(United States) A Weinhold (United States) C Whoriskey	6	3	[14]
(Japan) N Hibino (Canada) R Johanson	4	6	[12]
