= 2016 FSP Gold River Women's Challenger – Doubles =

Doubles
- 2016 FSP Gold River Women's Challenger

Final
- Champions: (United States) Ashley Weinhold (United States) Caitlin Whoriskey
- Runners-up: (United States) Jamie Loeb (South Africa) Chanel Simmonds
- Score: 6–4, 6–4

Events
Singles	Doubles
← 2015 ·	FSP Gold River Women's Challenger	· 2017 →

Ashley Weinhold and Caitlin Whoriskey were the defending champions and successfully defended their title, defeating Jamie Loeb and Chanel Simmonds in the final, 6–4, 6–4.

== Seeds ==
1. (Belgium) An-Sophie Mestach / (United Kingdom) Tara Moore (quarterfinals, withdrew)
2. (United States) Ashley Weinhold / (United States) Caitlin Whoriskey (champions)
3. (United States) Jamie Loeb / (South Africa) Chanel Simmonds (final)
4. (United Kingdom) Freya Christie / (United Kingdom) Laura Robson (first round, withdrew)

== Draw ==
=== Key ===
- Q = Qualifier
- WC = Wild card
- LL = Lucky loser
- Alt = Alternate
- SE = Special exempt
- PR = Protected ranking
- ITF = ITF entry
- JE = Junior exempt
- w/o = Walkover
- r = Retired
- d = Defaulted
- SR = Special ranking

First round
1	(Belgium) A-S Mestach (United Kingdom) T Moore	6	6
(United States) A Facey (United States) K Facey	1	4
(United States) A Mackey (United States) K Vyrlan	1	3
(United States) J Cako (Serbia) J Jakšić	6	6
3	(United States) J Loeb (South Africa) C Simmonds	6	6
(United States) C Dolehide (United States) S Kenin	4	3
(United States) YK Chiang (Ukraine) E Ianchuk	6	6^{3}	[10]
(United States) K Christian (United States) S Santamaria	2	7^{7}	[5]
Alt	(Lithuania) D Bulatovaitė (Moldova) A Soltanici	7^{8}	0	[4]
(Japan) S Akita (France) C Roméo	6^{6}	6	[10]
WC	(Sweden) I Kling (United States) L McGaffigan	w/o
4	(United Kingdom) F Christie (United Kingdom) L Robson
(United States) K Ahn (United States) G Min	6	6
(Australia) L Cabrera (Australia) P Hon	2	3
(Belgium) G Minnen (Belgium) A Van Uytvanck	4	1
2	(United States) A Weinhold (United States) C Whoriskey	6	6

Quarterfinals
1	(Belgium) A-S Mestach (United Kingdom) T Moore
(United States) J Cako (Serbia) J Jakšić	w/o
3	(United States) J Loeb (South Africa) C Simmonds	6	6
(United States) YK Chiang (Ukraine) E Ianchuk	1	3
(Japan) S Akita (France) C Roméo	6	6
WC	(Sweden) I Kling (United States) L McGaffigan	2	1
(United States) K Ahn (United States) G Min	2	2
2	(United States) A Weinhold (United States) C Whoriskey	6	6

Semifinals
(United States) J Cako (Serbia) J Jakšić	6^{7}	7^{7}	[9]
3	(United States) J Loeb (South Africa) C Simmonds	7^{9}	6^{4}	[11]
(Japan) S Akita (France) C Roméo	4	2
2	(United States) A Weinhold (United States) C Whoriskey	6	6

Final
3	(United States) J Loeb (South Africa) C Simmonds	4	4
2	(United States) A Weinhold (United States) C Whoriskey	6	6
