= 2013 FSP Gold River Women's Challenger – Singles =

Singles
- 2013 FSP Gold River Women's Challenger

Final
- Champion: (Japan) Mayo Hibi
- Runner-up: (United States) Madison Brengle
- Score: 7–5, 6–0

Events
| Singles | Doubles |
| ← 2012 · | FSP Gold River Women's Challenger | · 2014 → |

Maria Sanchez was the defending champion, having won the event in 2012, but she lost to Ivana Lisjak in the second round.

Mayo Hibi won the title, defeating Madison Brengle in the final, 7–5, 6–0.

== Seeds ==
1. (United States) Maria Sanchez (second round)
2. (South Africa) Chanel Simmonds (first round)
3. (France) Julie Coin (second round)
4. (Slovenia) Petra Rampre (quarterfinals)
5. (United States) Madison Brengle (final)
6. (Australia) Storm Sanders (first round)
7. (Canada) Heidi El Tabakh (quarterfinals)
8. (United States) Victoria Duval (first round)

== Main draw ==
=== Key ===
- Q = Qualifier
- WC = Wild card
- LL = Lucky loser
- Alt = Alternate
- SE = Special exempt
- PR = Protected ranking
- ITF = ITF entry
- JE = Junior exempt
- w/o = Walkover
- r = Retired
- d = Defaulted
- SR = Special ranking

=== Finals ===
Semifinals
PR | (Croatia) Ivana Lisjak | 3 | 6 | 5
5 | (United States) Madison Brengle | 6 | 3 | 7
(United States) Allie Will | 6 | 2 | 4
(Japan) Mayo Hibi | 4 | 6 | 6

Final
5 | (United States) Madison Brengle | 5 | 0
(Japan) Mayo Hibi | 7 | 6

=== Top half ===
First round
1/WC | (United States) M Sanchez | 6 | 6
WC | (United States) L Embree | 1 | 3
PR | (Croatia) I Lisjak | 6 | 6
(United States) N Pluskota | 1 | 3
Q | (Russia) A Kleybanova | 6 | 6
(United States) B Austin | 4 | 1
Q | (United States) M Weatherholt | 7^{7} | 7^{7}
6 | (Australia) S Sanders | 6^{3} | 6^{5}
4 | (Slovenia) P Rampre | 4 | 6 | 6
(United States) J Abaza | 6 | 3 | 3
(United States) A Kiick | 4 | 6 | 6
WC | (United States) B Morgan | 6 | 2 | 0
(South Korea) S-r Lee | 6 | 6
(Croatia) J Pandžić | 2 | 4
(United Kingdom) E Webley-Smith | 0 | 1
5 | (United States) M Brengle | 6 | 6

Second round
1/WC | (United States) M Sanchez | 4 | 5
PR | (Croatia) I Lisjak | 6 | 7
Q | (Russia) A Kleybanova | 6 | 6
Q | (United States) M Weatherholt | 1 | 2
4 | (Slovenia) P Rampre | 6 | 6
(United States) A Kiick | 2 | 0
(South Korea) S-r Lee | 0 | 2
5 | (United States) M Brengle | 6 | 6

Quarterfinals
PR | (Croatia) I Lisjak | 0 | 6 | 7^{7}
Q | (Russia) A Kleybanova | 6 | 2 | 6^{2}
4 | (Slovenia) P Rampre | 3 | 3
5 | (United States) M Brengle | 6 | 6

Semifinals
PR | (Croatia) I Lisjak | 3 | 6 | 5
5 | (United States) M Brengle | 6 | 3 | 7

=== Bottom half ===
First round
7 | (Canada) H El Tabakh | 4 | 6 | 6
(United States) A Muhammad | 6 | 3 | 3
(Japan) M Minokoshi | 6 | 3 | 6
(Australia) S Peers | 2 | 6 | 3
(United States) A Will | 5
Q | (United States) R Anderson | 7
(United Kingdom) N Broady | 6^{5} | 1
3 | (France) J Coin | 7^{7} | 6
8 | (United States) V Duval | 5 | 7 | 0
(Japan) M Hibi | 7 | 5 | 6
Q | (United States) J Lawrence | 6 | 3 | 6
(Russia) A Gabueva | 1 | 6 | 1
(United States) S Marand | 2 | 3
(United States) A Weinhold | 6 | 6
(United States) A Stevenson | 6 | 6
2 | (South Africa) C Simmonds | 2 | 0

Second round
7 | (Canada) H El Tabakh | 6 | 6
(Japan) M Minokoshi | 0 | 2
(United States) A Will | 7 | 3 | 6
3 | (France) J Coin | 5 | 6 | 4
(Japan) M Hibi | 6 | 6
Q | (United States) J Lawrence | 3 | 0
(United States) A Weinhold | 3 | 6 | 2
(United States) A Stevenson | 6 | 4 | 6

Quarterfinals
7 | (Canada) H El Tabakh | 6 | 4 | 4
(United States) A Will | 3 | 6 | 6
(Japan) M Hibi | 6 | 6
(United States) A Stevenson | 2 | 1

Semifinals
(United States) A Will | 6 | 2 | 4
(Japan) M Hibi | 4 | 6 | 6
