= 2017 FSP Gold River Women's Challenger – Doubles =

Doubles
- 2017 FSP Gold River Women's Challenger

Final
- Champion: (United States) Desirae Krawczyk (Mexico) Giuliana Olmos
- Runner-up: (Serbia) Jovana Jakšić (Belarus) Vera Lapko
- Score: 6–1, 6–2

Events
Singles	Doubles
← 2016 ·	FSP Gold River Women's Challenger	· 2018 →

Ashley Weinhold and Caitlin Whoriskey were the defending champions, but chose not to participate.

Desirae Krawczyk and Giuliana Olmos won the title, defeating Jovana Jakšić and Vera Lapko in the final, 6–1, 6–2.

== Seeds ==
1. (Serbia) Jovana Jakšić / (Belarus) Vera Lapko (final)
2. (United States) Desirae Krawczyk / (Mexico) Giuliana Olmos (champions)
3. (United States) Emina Bektas / (United States) Francesca Di Lorenzo (quarterfinals)
4. (United States) Alexandra Mueller / (United States) Jessica Wacnik (quarterfinals)

== Draw ==
=== Key ===
- Q = Qualifier
- WC = Wild card
- LL = Lucky loser
- Alt = Alternate
- SE = Special exempt
- PR = Protected ranking
- ITF = ITF entry
- JE = Junior exempt
- w/o = Walkover
- r = Retired
- d = Defaulted
- SR = Special ranking

First round
(United States) J Elie (United States) S Vickery	6	7^{7}
(Lithuania) D Bulatovaitė (Moldova) A Soltanici	2	6^{2}
3	(United States) E Bektas (United States) F Di Lorenzo	6	6
WC	(United States) S Saltzen (United States) J Taggart	3	1
(United States) K Christian (United States) E Shibahara	6	6
(United States) V Duval (United States) G Min	3	4
(United States) K Facey (United States) A Miller	1	2
(United States) A Kratzer (South Africa) C Simmonds	6	6
(Ukraine) M Kozachenko (United States) A Wise	1	3
4	(United States) A Mueller (United States) J Wacnik	6	6
(United States) S Ewing (United States) E Oosterhout	1	3
(United States) C Dolehide (United States) I Neel	6	6

Quarterfinals
1	(Serbia) J Jakšić (Belarus) V Lapko	6	6
(United States) J Elie (United States) S Vickery	3	2
3	(United States) E Bektas (United States) F Di Lorenzo	0	6	[8]
(United States) K Christian (United States) E Shibahara	6	1	[10]
(United States) A Kratzer (South Africa) C Simmonds	6	6
4	(United States) A Mueller (United States) J Wacnik	4	4
(United States) C Dolehide (United States) I Neel	3	2
2	(United States) D Krawczyk (Mexico) G Olmos	6	6

Semifinals
1	(Serbia) J Jakšić (Belarus) V Lapko	7	4	[10]
(United States) K Christian (United States) E Shibahara	5	6	[8]
(United States) A Kratzer (South Africa) C Simmonds	6	2	[6]
2	(United States) D Krawczyk (Mexico) G Olmos	2	6	[10]

Final
1	(Serbia) J Jakšić (Belarus) V Lapko	1	2
2	(United States) D Krawczyk (Mexico) G Olmos	6	6
