= 2013 FSP Gold River Women's Challenger =

- Date: July 1–7
- Edition: 2nd
- Draw: 32S / 16D
- Prize money: $50,000
- Surface: Hard
- Location: Sacramento, United States

Champions

Singles
- (Japan) Mayo Hibi

Doubles
- (United Kingdom) Naomi Broady / (Australia) Storm Sanders
| ← 2012 · | FSP Gold River Women's Challenger | · 2014 → |

The 2013 FSP Gold River Women's Challenger was a professional tennis tournament played on outdoor hard courts. It was the second edition of the tournament which was part of the 2013 ITF Women's Circuit, offering a total of $50,000 in prize money. It took place in Sacramento, United States, on July 1–7, 2013.

== WTA entrants ==
=== Seeds ===
| Country | Player | Rank^{1} | Seed |
|---|---|---|---|
| USA | Maria Sanchez | 114 | 1 |
| RSA | Chanel Simmonds | 164 | 2 |
| FRA | Julie Coin | 175 | 3 |
| SLO | Petra Rampre | 207 | 4 |
| USA | Madison Brengle | 219 | 5 |
| AUS | Storm Sanders | 258 | 6 |
| CAN | Heidi El Tabakh | 262 | 7 |
| USA | Victoria Duval | 291 | 8 |

- ^{1} Rankings as of June 24, 2013

=== Other entrants ===
The following players received wildcards into the singles main draw:

- (United States) Lauren Embree
- (United States) Brianna Morgan
- (United States) Maria Sanchez

The following players received entry from the qualifying draw:

- (United States) Robin Anderson
- (Russia) Alisa Kleybanova
- (United States) Jessica Lawrence
- (United States) Mary Weatherholt

The following player received entry from a Protected Ranking:

- (Croatia) Ivana Lisjak

== Champions ==
=== Women's singles ===
- (Japan) Mayo Hibi def. (United States) Madison Brengle 7–5, 6–0

=== Women's doubles ===
- (United Kingdom) Naomi Broady / (Australia) Storm Sanders def. (United States) Robin Anderson / (United States) Lauren Embree 6–3, 6–4
