= 2017 FSP Gold River Women's Challenger =

- Date: 24–30 July
- Edition: 7th
- Category: ITF Women's Circuit
- Prize money: $60,000
- Surface: Hard
- Location: Sacramento, United States

Champions

Singles
- (United States) Amanda Anisimova

Doubles
- (United States) Desirae Krawczyk / (Mexico) Giuliana Olmos
← 2016 ·	FSP Gold River Women's Challenger	· 2018 →

The 2017 FSP Gold River Women's Challenger was a professional tennis tournament played on outdoor hard courts. It was the seventh edition of the tournament and was part of the 2017 ITF Women's Circuit. It took place in Sacramento, United States, on 24–30 July 2017.

== Singles main draw entrants ==
=== Seeds ===
Country	Player	Rank^{1}	Seed
USA	Jennifer Brady	80	1
USA	Kristie Ahn	117	2
USA	Kayla Day	129	3
USA	Sachia Vickery	143	4
USA	Jamie Loeb	154	5
AUS	Lizette Cabrera	155	6
USA	Danielle Collins	158	7
USA	Sofia Kenin	160	8

- ^{1} Rankings as of 17 July 2017.

=== Other entrants ===
The following players received a wildcard into the singles main draw:

- (United States) Robin Anderson
- (United States) Emina Bektas
- (United States) Jillian Taggart
- (United States) Anna Tatishvili

The following player received entry by a protected ranking:

- (Japan) Kimiko Date

The following player received entry by a special exempt:

- (United States) Ashley Kratzer

The following players received entry from the qualifying draw:

- (United States) Victoria Duval
- (United States) Ena Shibahara
- (South Africa) Chanel Simmonds
- (China) Xu Shilin

== Champions ==
=== Singles ===
- (United States) Amanda Anisimova def. (Croatia) Ajla Tomljanović, walkover

=== Doubles ===
- (United States) Desirae Krawczyk / (Mexico) Giuliana Olmos def. (Serbia) Jovana Jakšić / (Belarus) Vera Lapko, 6–1, 6–2
