= Hsu Chieh-yu =

Taiwanese-American tennis player

Hsu Chieh-yu 許絜瑜
- Country (sports): United States (2001–2014); Chinese Taipei (2014–present)
- Born: 14 January 1992 (age 34) Taiwan
- Prize money: $250,768

Singles
- Career record: 402–402
- Career titles: 6 ITF
- Highest ranking: No. 224 (21 April 2014)

Grand Slam singles results
- US Open: Q1 (2013)

Doubles
- Career record: 386–339
- Career titles: 27 ITF
- Highest ranking: No. 114 (23 February 2015)

Other doubles tournaments
- Olympic Games: 1R (2021)

Team competitions
- Fed Cup: 6–6
Medal record
Representing Chinese Taipei
Tennis
Universiade
Gold medal – first place	2015 Gwangju	Women's team
Silver medal – second place	2015 Gwangju	Women's doubles
- Last updated on: 30 July 2026.

Hsu Chieh-yu (Chinese: 許絜瑜; pinyin: Xǔ Jié-yú; also known as Connie Hsu; born 14 January 1992) is a Taiwanese-American inactive tennis player.

Hsu has won six singles and twenty-seven doubles titles on the ITF Women's Circuit. On 21 April 2014, she reached her best singles ranking of world No. 224. On 23 February 2015, she peaked at No. 114 in the WTA doubles rankings. She represented Chinese Taipei to compete in the Tokyo 2020 Summer Olympics (women's doubles).

== Career ==
Hsu, born in Taiwan, moved to the United States in 2001 and represented the U.S. in her junior and college tennis career. In 2007, she debuted on the WTA Tour at the Cincinnati Open. In 2010, she studied at the University of Pennsylvania, before turning professional in the summer of 2011. However, at the Melbourne Pro Classic in April 2014, she started competing under the flag of Chinese Taipei.

== ITF Circuit finals ==
=== Singles: 8 (6 titles, 2 runner-ups) ===
Legend $25,000 tournaments $10/15,000 tournaments	Finals by surface Hard (4–2) Clay (2–0)

Result	W–L	Date	Tournament	Tier	Surface	Opponent	Score
Win	1–0	Dec 2009	ITF Veracruz, Mexico	10,000	Hard	(Brazil) Vivian Segnini	7–5, 6–4
Win	2–0	Jun 2011	ITF Taipei, Taiwan	10,000	Hard	(Chinese Taipei) Chan Chin-wei	6–1, 6–4
Win	3–0	Sep 2011	ITF Antalya, Turkey	10,000	Hard	(Germany) Christina Shakovets	6–4, 6–0
Win	4–0	Sep 2011	ITF Adana, Turkey	10,000	Hard	(Czech Republic) Nikola Fraňková	6–0, 7–5
Loss	4–1	Nov 2016	ITF Hua Hin, Thailand	10,000	Hard	(Cambodia) Andrea Ka	6–4, 0–6, 6–7^{(0)}
Win	5–1	Feb 2017	ITF Hammamet, Tunisia	15,000	Clay	(Egypt) Sandra Samir	6–2, 2–6, 6–1
Loss	5–2	Jul 2017	ITF Hua Hin, Thailand	15,000	Hard	(Australia) Michaela Haet	2–6, 7–6^{(5)}, 5–7
Win	6–2	Jun 2019	ITF Shreveport, United States	15,000	Clay	(United States) Alycia Parks	6–2, 6–3

=== Doubles: 54 (27 titles, 27 runner-ups) ===
Legend W100 tournaments W80 tournaments W50 tournaments W25/35 tournaments W15 tournaments	Finals by surface Hard (15–15) Clay (11–11) Carpet (1–1)

Result	No.	Date	Tournament	Tier	Surface	Partner	Opponents	Score
Loss	0–1	Dec 2009	ITF Veracruz, Mexico	10,000	Hard	(Russia) Nika Kukharchuk	(Slovakia) Dominika Diešková (United States) Mashona Washington	5–7, 4–6
Loss	0–2	Jul 2010	ITF Waterloo, Canada	25,000	Clay	(United States) Lauren Albanese	(Canada) Elisabeth Abanda (Canada) Katarena Paliivets	w/o
Win	1–2	May 2011	ITF Landisville, US	10,000	Hard	(United Kingdom) Nicola Slater	(Australia) Brooke Rischbieth (Australia) Storm Sanders	7–5, 6–3
Win	2–2	Sep 2011	ITF Antalya, Turkey	10,000	Hard	(Slovakia) Lucia Butkovská	(Ukraine) Khristina Kazimova (Belarus) Sasha Khabibulina	6–2, 6–2
Win	3–2	Sep 2011	ITF Adana, Turkey	10,000	Hard	(Czech Republic) Nikola Fraňková	(Turkey) Hülya Esen (Turkey) Lütfiye Esen	7–6^{(4)}, 6–4
Win	4–2	May 2012	ITF Landisville, US	10,000	Hard	(United States) Macall Harkins	(Canada) Gabriela Dabrowski (United States) Alexandra Mueller	6–3, 6–4
Loss	4–3	Sep 2012	ITF Redding, US	25,000	Hard	(United States) Macall Harkins	(United States) Jacqueline Cako (United States) Sanaz Marand	6–7^{(5)}, 5–7
Loss	4–4	Oct 2012	ITF Rock Hill, US	25,000	Hard	(United States) Chiara Scholl	(United States) Jacqueline Cako (United States) Natalie Pluskota	2–6, 3–6
Win	5–4	Jan 2013	ITF Innisbrook, US	25,000	Clay	(Norway) Ulrikke Eikeri	(Argentina) Florencia Molinero (Venezuela) Adriana Pérez	6–3, 6–0
Loss	5–5	Sep 2013	ITF Victoria, Mexico	15,000	Hard	(Mexico) Ana Sofía Sánchez	(Bolivia) María Fernanda Álvarez Terán (Argentina) María Irigoyen	6–7^{(2)}, 3–6
Win	6–5	Dec 2013	ITF Mérida, Mexico	25,000	Hard	(Argentina) María Irigoyen	(Sweden) Hilda Melander (Sweden) Rebecca Peterson	6–4, 5–7, [10–6]
Loss	6–6	Dec 2013	ITF Mérida, Mexico	25,000	Hard	(Bulgaria) Dia Evtimova	(Serbia) Barbara Bonić (Sweden) Hilda Melander	3–6, 5–7
Win	7–6	May 2014	ITF Raleigh, US	25,000	Clay	(United States) Alexandra Mueller	(United States) Danielle Lao (United States) Keri Wong	6–3, 6–3
Loss	7–7	Jun 2014	ITF El Paso, US	25,000	Hard	(United States) Danielle Lao	(United States) Jamie Loeb (United States) Ashley Weinhold	6–4, 4–6, [13–15]
Loss	7–8	Jun 2014	Open de Montpellier, France	25,000	Clay	(Bulgaria) Elitsa Kostova	(Spain) Inés Ferrer Suárez (Spain) Sara Sorribes Tormo	6–2, 3–6, [10–12]
Loss	7–9	Dec 2014	ITF Mérida, Mexico	25,000	Hard	(United States) Jan Abaza	(Germany) Tatjana Maria (Mexico) Renata Zarazúa	6–7^{(1)}, 1–6
Win	8–9	Jan 2015	ITF Hong Kong, China SAR	50,000	Hard	(China) Han Xinyun	(Thailand) Varatchaya Wongteanchai (Thailand) Varunya Wongteanchai	3–6, 6–4, [10–8]
Loss	8–10	Sep 2015	ITF Monterrey, Mexico	25,000	Hard	(Chile) Alexa Guarachi	(Slovenia) Tadeja Majerič (Switzerland) Conny Perrin	5–7, 3–6
Loss	8–11	Oct 2015	ITF Sharm El Sheikh, Egypt	10,000	Hard	(Russia) Anna Morgina	(United Kingdom) Emily Arbuthnott (United Kingdom) Lisa Whybourn	2–6, 4–6
Win	9–11	Nov 2015	ITF Sharm El Sheikh, Egypt	10,000	Hard	(Czech Republic) Martina Přádová	(Belgium) Vicky Geurinckx (Russia) Melissa Ifidzhen	6–2, 6–4
Loss	9–12	Dec 2015	Pune Championships, India	25,000	Hard	(India) Prarthana Thombare	(Russia) Valentyna Ivakhnenko (Ukraine) Anastasiya Vasylyeva	6–4, 2–6, [10–12]
Win	10–12	Aug 2016	ITF Fort Worth, US	25,000	Hard	(South Africa) Chanel Simmonds	(United States) Jacqueline Cako (United States) Danielle Lao	6–0, 6–4
Loss	10–13	Oct 2016	ITF Hamamatsu, Japan	25,000	Carpet	(Poland) Justyna Jegiołka	(Croatia) Jana Fett (Japan) Ayaka Okuno	6–4, 6–7^{(5)}, [10–12]
Loss	10–14	Feb 2017	ITF Hammamet, Tunisia	15,000	Clay	(Russia) Yana Sizikova	(Italy) Giorgia Marchetti (Italy) Angelica Moratelli	4–6, 3–6
Loss	10–15	Feb 2017	ITF Hammamet, Tunisia	15,000	Clay	(France) Victoria Muntean	(Italy) Giorgia Marchetti (Italy) Angelica Moratelli	6–2, 3–6, [8–10]
Win	11–15	Feb 2017	ITF Hammamet, Tunisia	15,000	Clay	(Egypt) Sandra Samir	(Sweden) Ida Jarlskog (Sweden) Julia Rosenqvist	6–2, 7–5
Win	12–15	Mar 2017	ITF Tampa, US	15,000	Clay	(Chile) Alexa Guarachi	(United States) Emina Bektas (United States) Sanaz Marand	6–3, 4–6, [10–4]
Loss	12–16	Aug 2017	ITF Tsukuba, Japan	25,000	Hard	(Australia) Naiktha Bains	(Japan) Miharu Imanishi (Japan) Akiko Omae	4–6, 4–6
Win	13–16	Sep 2017	ITF Nanao, Japan	25,000	Carpet	(Japan) Miharu Imanishi	(Japan) Akari Inoue (Japan) Miyabi Inoue	7–6^{(7)}, 6–2
Win	14–16	Jan 2018	ITF Hammamet, Tunisia	15,000	Clay	(France) Victoria Muntean	(Russia) Maria Marfutina (Romania) Ioana Loredana Roșca	3–6, 7–5, [10–5]
Loss	14–17	Feb 2018	ITF Hammamet, Tunisia	15,000	Clay	(Egypt) Sandra Samir	(Italy) Melania Delai (Italy) Angelica Moratelli	2–6, 4–6
Win	15–17	Feb 2018	ITF Curitiba, Brazil	25,000	Clay	(Mexico) Marcela Zacarías	(France) Audrey Albié (France) Harmony Tan	6–0, 6–3
Loss	15–18	Mar 2018	ITF São Paulo, Brazil	25,000	Clay	(Mexico) Marcela Zacarías	(United Kingdom) Tara Moore (Switzerland) Conny Perrin	4–6, 6–3, [11–13]
Loss	15–19	Jul 2018	Challenger de Gatineau, Canada	25,000	Hard	(Mexico) Marcela Zacarías	(Canada) Bianca Andreescu (Canada) Carson Branstine	6–4, 2–6, [4–10]
Win	16–19	Aug 2018	ITF Fort Worth, US	25,000	Hard	(Mexico) Marcela Zacarías	(Japan) Ayaka Okuno (Australia) Olivia Tjandramulia	3–6, 7–6^{(6)}, [10–6]
Loss	16–20	Oct 2018	ITF Charleston, US	25,000	Clay	(Romania) Gabriela Talabă	(United States) Sophie Chang (United States) Alexandra Mueller	4–6, 4–6
Win	17–20	May 2019	ITF Changwon, Korea	W25	Hard	(South Africa) Chanel Simmonds	(South Korea) Choi Ji-hee (Chinese Taipei) Lee Ya-hsuan	6–3, 6–4
Win	18–20	May 2019	ITF Goyang, Korea	W25	Hard	(South Africa) Chanel Simmonds	(South Korea) Kim Na-ri (South Korea) Lee So-ra	6–1, 6–3
Win	19–20	Jun 2019	ITF Shreveport, US	W15	Clay	(Montenegro) Vladica Babić	(United States) Jennifer Elie (Australia) Alexandra Osborne	6–2, 6–0
Win	20–20	Jul 2019	ITF Saskatoon, Canada	W25	Hard	(Mexico) Marcela Zacarías	(Japan) Haruka Kaji (Japan) Momoko Kobori	6–3, 6–2
Loss	20–21	Jul 2019	Challenger de Gatineau, Canada	W25	Hard	(Mexico) Marcela Zacarías	(Canada) Leylah Fernandez (Canada) Rebecca Marino	6–7^{(5)}, 3–6
Win	21–21	Jul 2019	ITF Evansville, US	W25	Hard	(South Africa) Chanel Simmonds	(Japan) Haruna Arakawa (United States) Pamela Montez	6–2, 6–0
Win	22–21	Aug 2019	ITF Fort Worth, US	W25	Hard	(Romania) Gabriela Talabă	(United States) Elysia Bolton (United States) Jada Hart	7–6^{(8)}, 7–5
Win	23–21	Aug 2019	ITF Guayaquil, Ecuador	W25	Clay	(Mexico) Marcela Zacarías	(Colombia) Emiliana Arango (United States) Katerina Stewart	6–4, 6–2
Loss	23–22	Nov 2019	Tyler Pro Challenge, US	W80	Hard	(Mexico) Marcela Zacarías	(Indonesia) Jessy Rompies (Indonesia) Beatrice Gumulya	2–6, 3–6
Win	24–22	Jan 2020, US	ITF Vero Beach, US	W25	Clay	(Hungary) Panna Udvardy	(Spain) Irene Burillo (Spain) Andrea Lázaro García	7–5, 4–6, [10–7]
Loss	24–23	Nov 2021	ITF Naples, US	W25	Clay	(Indonesia) Jessy Rompies	(United States) Hanna Chang (United States) Elizabeth Mandlik	4–6, 6–1, [7–10]
Loss	24–24	Apr 2022	ITF Orlando, US	W25	Clay	(Chinese Taipei) Hsieh Yu-chieh	(United States) Catherine Harrison (United States) Maegan Manasse	1–6, 0–6
Win	25–24	May 2022	ITF Daytona Beach, US	W25	Clay	(Chinese Taipei) Hsieh Yu-chieh	(Switzerland) Chelsea Fontenel (United States) Hina Inoue	7–5, 6–0
Loss	25–25	May 2022	ITF Sarasota, US	W25	Clay	(Chinese Taipei) Hsieh Yu-chieh	(China) Ma Yexin (Lithuania) Akvilė Paražinskaitė	2–6, 5–7
Loss	25–26	Sep 2022	ITF Lubbock, US	W15	Hard	(Russia) Maria Kononova	(Serbia) Katarina Kozarov (Russia) Veronika Miroshnichenko	1–6, 6–4, [9–11]
Win	26–26	Sep 2023	ITF Hilton Head, US	W15	Clay	(United States) Mia Yamakita	(Peru) Lucciana Pérez (Japan) Wakana Sonobe	6–2, 7–5
Win	27–26	Oct 2023	ITF Jackson, US	W15	Hard	(Ukraine) Anita Sahdiieva	(United States) Adeline Flach (Kenya) Angella Okutoyi	7–5, 6–3
Loss	27–27	Jan 2024	ITF Naples, US	W35	Clay	(Japan) Mayuka Aikawa	(Belgium) Marie Benoît (Switzerland) Leonie Küng	7–6^{(2)}, 2–6, [8–10]
