= FSP Gold River Women's Challenger =

- 2017 FSP Gold River Women's Challenger

Women's World Tennis Tour
- Event name: FSP Gold River Women's Challenger
- Location: Sacramento, California, United States
- Venue: Gold River Racquet Club
- Category: ITF $60,000
- Surface: Hard
- Draw: 32S/32Q/16D
- Prize money: $60,000
- Website: www.goldriverchallenger.com

The FSP Gold River Women's Challenger was a tournament for professional female tennis players played on outdoor hardcourts. The event was classified as a $60,000 ITF Women's Circuit tournament and had been held in Sacramento, California since 2012.

== Past finals ==
=== Singles ===
| Year | Champion | Runner-up | Score |
|---|---|---|---|
| 2017 | (United States) Amanda Anisimova | (Croatia) Ajla Tomljanović | w/o |
| 2016 | (United States) Sofia Kenin | (United States) Grace Min | 4–6, 6–1, 6–4 |
| 2015 | (Ukraine) Anhelina Kalinina | (Belgium) An-Sophie Mestach | 4–6, 6–4, 6–3 |
| 2014 | (Australia) Olivia Rogowska | (United States) Julia Boserup | 6–2, 7–5 |
| 2013 | (Japan) Mayo Hibi | (United States) Madison Brengle | 7–5, 6–0 |
| 2012 | (United States) Maria Sanchez | (United States) Jessica Pegula | 4–6, 6–3, 6–1 |

=== Doubles ===
| Year | Champions | Runners-up | Score |
|---|---|---|---|
| 2017 | (United States) Desirae Krawczyk (Mexico) Giuliana Olmos | (Serbia) Jovana Jakšić (Belarus) Vera Lapko | 6–1, 6–2 |
| 2016 | (United States) Ashley Weinhold (United States) Caitlin Whoriskey | (United States) Jamie Loeb (South Africa) Chanel Simmonds | 6–4, 6–4 |
| 2015 | (United States) Ashley Weinhold (United States) Caitlin Whoriskey | (Japan) Nao Hibino (Canada) Rosie Johanson | 6–4, 3–6, [14–12] |
| 2014 | (Russia) Daria Gavrilova (Australia) Storm Sanders | (United States) Maria Sanchez (United States) Zoë Gwen Scandalis | 6–2, 6–1 |
| 2013 | (United Kingdom) Naomi Broady (Australia) Storm Sanders | (United States) Robin Anderson (United States) Lauren Embree | 6–3, 6–4 |
| 2012 | (United States) Asia Muhammad (United States) Yasmin Schnack | (United States) Kaitlyn Christian (United States) Maria Sanchez | 6–3, 7–6^{(7–4)} |
