= Olivia Rogowska =

Australian tennis player

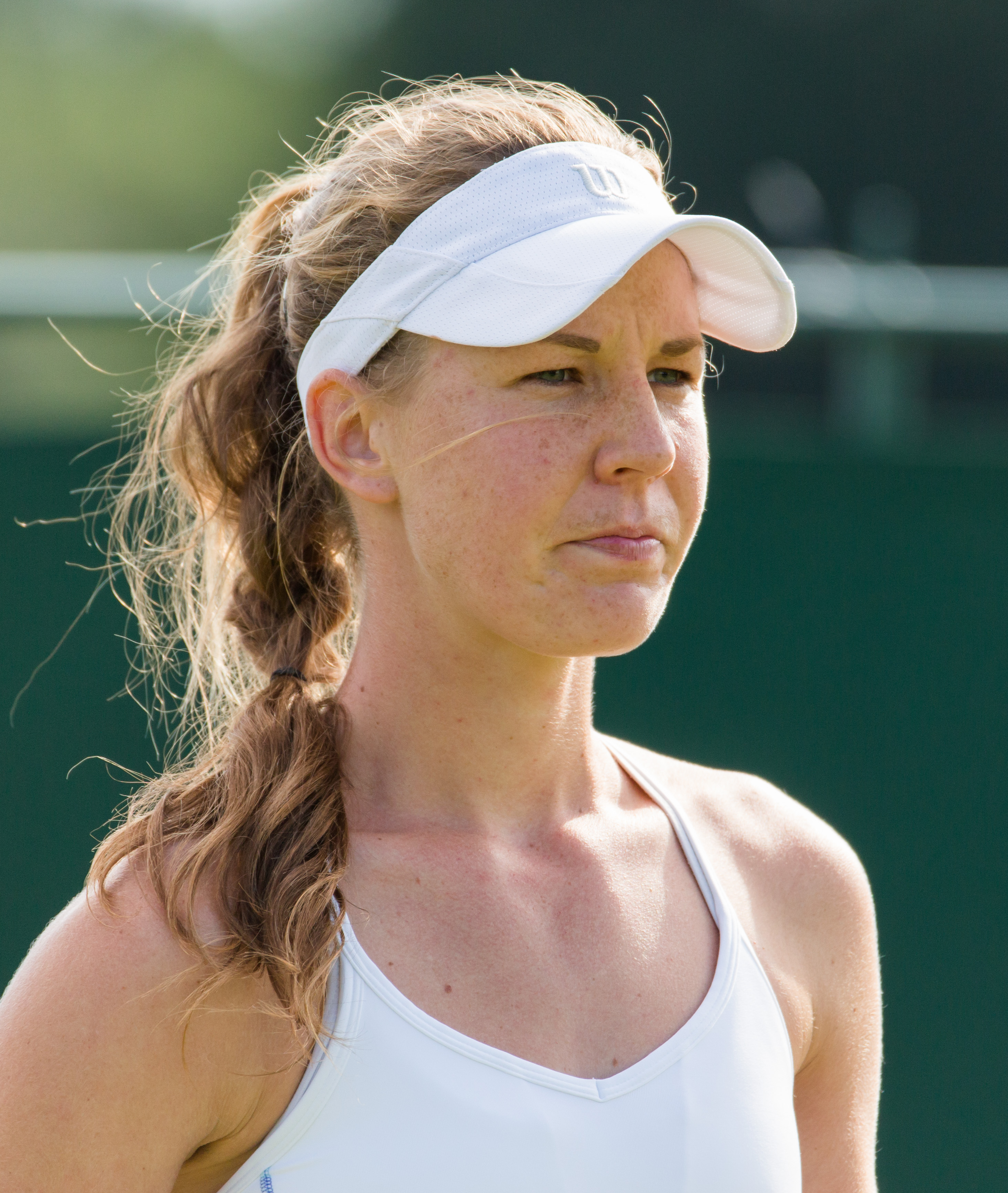
- Rogowska at the 2015 Wimbledon qualifying
- Country (sports): Australia
- Residence: Melbourne, Australia
- Born: 7 June 1991 (age 35) Melbourne
- Height: 175 cm (5 ft 9 in)
- Turned pro: 2007
- Retired: February 2020
- Plays: Right-handed (two-handed backhand)
- Prize money: $996,980

Singles
- Career record: 388–301
- Career titles: 16 ITF
- Highest ranking: No. 102 (11 August 2014)

Grand Slam singles results
- Australian Open: 2R (2012, 2014, 2018)
- French Open: 2R (2009)
- Wimbledon: Q3 (2009)
- US Open: 1R (2009, 2012, 2013)

Doubles
- Career record: 176–136
- Career titles: 18 ITF
- Highest ranking: No. 86 (4 August 2014)

Grand Slam doubles results
- Australian Open: 3R (2014)
- Wimbledon: Q2 (2012)

Grand Slam mixed doubles results
- Australian Open: 1R (2011, 2012, 2013, 2014)

Team competitions
- Fed Cup: 1R (2015), record 0–3
Medal record
Commonwealth Games
Silver medal – second place	2010 Delhi	Women's doubles

Olivia Rogowska (Polish pronunciation: [rɔˈɡɔfska]; born 7 June 1991) is an Australian former tennis player. Both of her parents are Polish.

The right-hander was born in and lives in Melbourne. Her career-high singles ranking is world No. 102, achieved on 11 August 2014. Her career high in doubles is No. 89, which she reached on 28 July 2014. She has defeated Jelena Dokić, Alicia Molik, and Maria Kirilenko, and taken sets from former No. 1, Dinara Safina, from Alona Bondarenko, Kateryna Bondarenko, Sorana Cîrstea, Jarmila Gajdošová, Anastasia Rodionova, Sania Mirza, and Casey Dellacqua.

== Professional ==
=== 2005–2008 ===
Rogowska started her career on the ITF Circuit at age 14, losing in the first round of qualifying at a $25k event in Mount Gambier. At the age of 15, she won her first main-draw match at a $25k tournament in Melbourne. She had a disappointing 2007 season with a win–loss record of 3–9. Her fortunes picked up in 2008 making her first quarterfinal in a $25k tournament in Berri after qualifying. She then made her first semifinal in Budapest. Late in 2008, at a $25k event in Traralgon, Rogowska qualified and then made the quarterfinals. Her final tournament of the year was a $25k tournament in Sorrento, Australia. Rogowska broke through and won her first professional tournament at the age of 17– with the loss of only one set.

=== 2009 ===
She received a wildcard into the Australian Open and lost in the first round to the 31st seed Alona Bondarenko in a three-set match. She then received a wildcard into the French Open and defeated Maria Kirilenko in the first round in straight sets. In the second round, she lost to Kateryna Bondarenko in three sets.

After gaining another wildcard entry into the US Open, Olivia almost caused a major upset in her first-round match, taking world No. 1 and top seed Dinara Safina to three sets. She won the first set in a tie breaker and led 3–0 in the final set before her nerves set in and Safina made her comeback, losing 7–6, 2–6, 4–6. At the Wildcard Playoff for the 2010 Australian Open, Rogowska barely made the quarterfinal rounds by losing two out of three matches in the round-robin stage; she only made it through by one game. In the quarterfinals and semifinals Rogowska beat Monika Wejnert and Jessica Moore in straight sets, in the final Rogowska lead Casey Dellacqua 6–1, 5–2 and held three match points before Dellacqua came back to win 1–6, 7–6, 6–3.

=== 2010 ===
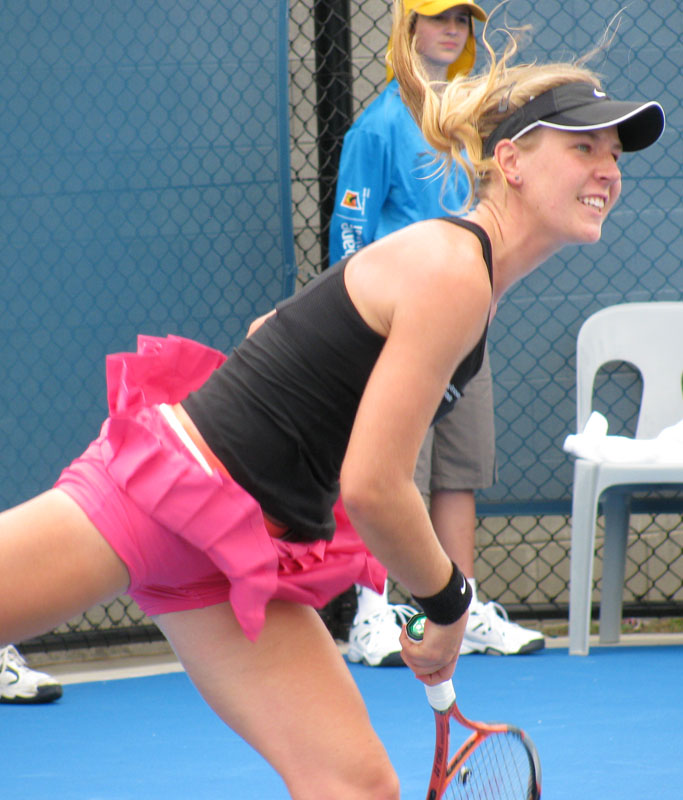
Olivia Rogowska at the 2010 Brisbane International

Rogowska played her first tournament in the Brisbane International defeating Anastasia Yakimova in the first qualifying round, before losing to Evgeniya Rodina. That began an 11-match losing streak, including a three-set loss to Sorana Cîrstea at the Australian Open.

She ended her losing streak in May reaching the quarterfinals of $50k+H Saint-Gaudens, losing to Kaia Kanepi, and continued to find moderate success in ITF events, while losing her first qualifying matches at the French Open, Wimbledon and the US Open.

Rogowska found form late in the year, winning the $25k Cairns doubles title, then the $25k Darwin singles title, followed by a semifinal at the $25k event in Alice Springs. She represented Australia at the 2010 Commonwealth Games, reaching the semifinals in singles where she lost to India's Sania Mirza 6–1, 4–6, 4–6, meaning she was relegated to the bronze-medal playoff where she lost to compatriot Sally Peers. She also made the doubles final with Jessica Moore to play for the gold medal but Rogowska and Moore lost the final to Anastasia Rodionova and Sally Peers, in three sets.

Her last tournament of the year was the Australian Open Wildcard Playoff. In the round-robin stage, she won her first match against Belinda Woolcock, then defeated Azra Hadzic and in her final round-robin match her Commonwealth Games doubles partner Jessica Moore, 7–6, 6–3. She then was drawn to face Sophie Ferguson for a place in the final and defeated her in straight sets. She came back from 1–6, 1–3 down in the final against Jelena Dokić in three sets to win a wildcard into the main draw of the 2011 Australian Open.

=== 2011 ===
Rogowska started her year at the qualifying draw at the Brisbane International. In the first round of qualifying, she defeated world No. 90, Zhang Shuai, in three sets, before losing to world No. 139, Arantxa Rus. In the Hobart International main draw, Rogowska easily lost to Tamira Paszek. In the Australian Open first round, she lost to Evgeniya Rodina in straight sets.

Rogowska then played the $25k Burnie International where she was eliminated in the quarterfinals. Up until the end of March, she played in singles and doubles at four $25k tournaments in Sydney, Mildura, Ipswich and Bundaberg. She lost early in singles in Sydney and Mildura but in Ipswich, she returned to form but lost in the semifinal to Sally Peers. Then in Bundaberg, Rogowska defeated Sandra Zaniewska, Olga Puchkova, Sacha Jones and Wsu Wen-hsin, before losing the final to Casey Dellacqua. She played with Dellacqua in doubles in all four events and they went on a 16-match winning streak to win those events.

At the French Open, Rogowska lost in the first round of qualifying to world No. 163, Regina Kulikova, 5–7, 3–6. Shen then played a $25k event in Grado and made the semifinal defeating Karolína Plíšková 6–4, 6–0, Yulia Putintseva 7–5, 6–2 and won when Lenka Juriková retired but lost to world No. 182, Ajla Tomljanović, in three sets. In early July, Rogowska played in her first match on WTA Tour since the Australian Open and qualified for the Swedish Open in Båstad where she played world No. 21 and second seed, Flavia Pennetta, and lost 2–6, 5–7.

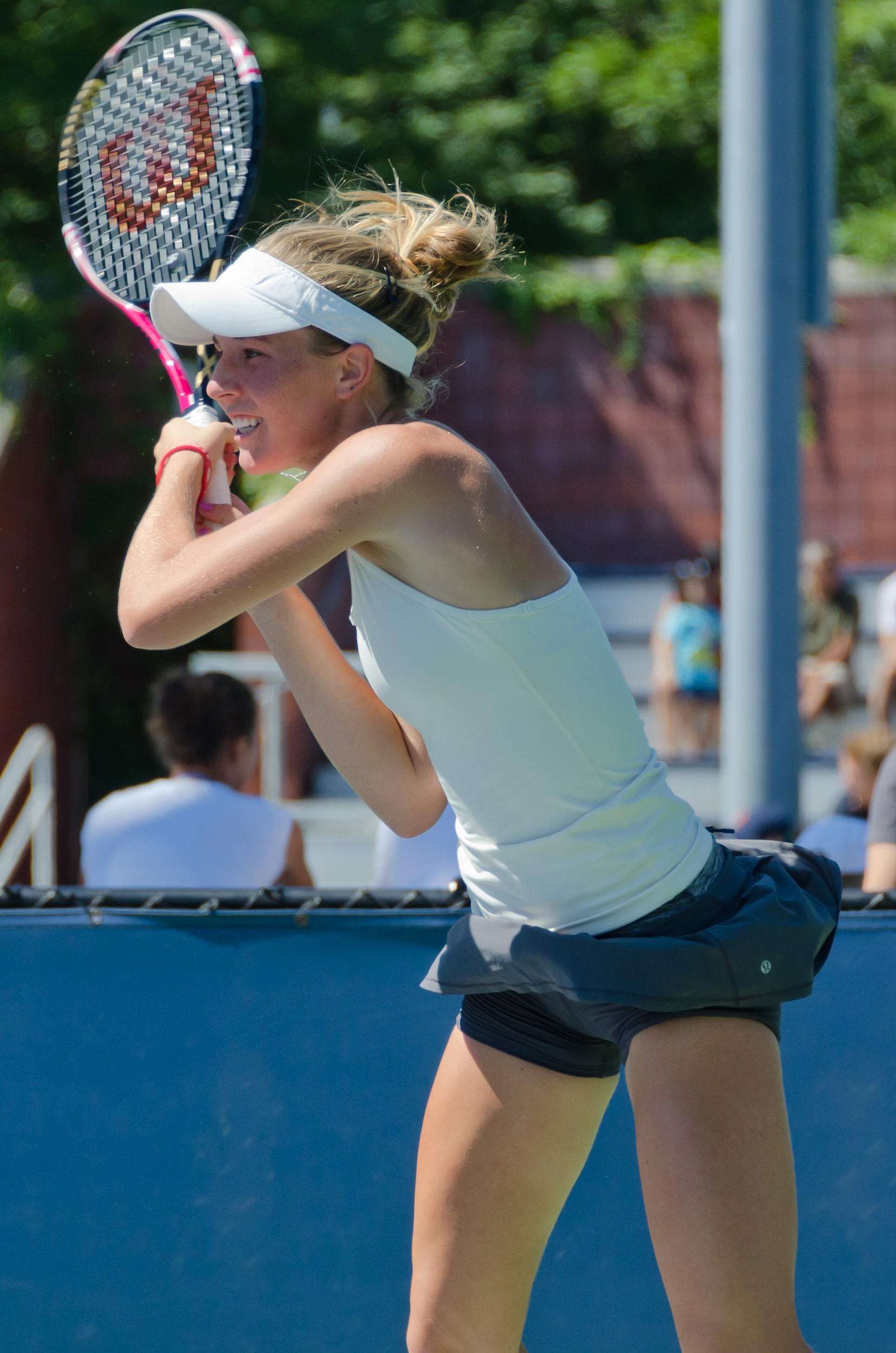
Olivia Rogowska at the 2011 US Open qualifying tournament

She next played in a $100k tournament to warm-up for the US Open. She qualified and made the second round. Rogowska lost in the first round of qualifying at the US Open to world No. 211, Petra Rampre, in a close two-setter. She then played eight $25k tournaments to end her year on the WTA Tour. She won her first singles tournament of the year in Alice Springs, after defeating Abbie Myers, Alison Bai, Tammi Patterson, Akiko Omae and Isabella Holland. Next in Darwin, she lost in the semifinals to Casey Dellacqua. Rogowska again lost to Dellacqua the next week in Esperance but this time in the final. Her good form continued with a quarterfinal in Kalgoorlie and then winning her second tournament of the year in Port Pirie beating world No. 127, Erika Sema, 6–3, 6–0 in the semifinal, and compatriot Bojana Bobusic, 6–3, 6–2 in the final. She then made two consecutive semifinals to end her year on the pro tour, losing to Sacha Jones in Traralgon, and Isabella Holland in Bendigo.

Her final tournament of the year was the Australian Open Wildcard Playoff where she won her pool matches against Azra Hadzic, Daniella Jeflea and Belinda Woolcock. In her semifinal match, she defeated Bojana Bobusic. She played 15-year-old Ashleigh Barty in the final and things looked good for Rogowska as she led 5–2 in the first set, but Barty came back and took the match 7–6, 6–2. Rogowska improved her WTA ranking in 2011 from 259 to 167.

=== 2012 ===
She started her year at the Brisbane International, after receiving a main-draw wildcard. She played world No. 44, Barbora Záhlavová-Strýcová, and put up a great fight, before going down 2–6, 6–4, 4–6. She then played the Hobart International qualifying, after receiving a wildcard. Rogowska recorded a great win beating world No. 69, Alberta Brianti, 6–1, 6–1 but lost to Heather Watson. After receiving a wildcard entry into the Australian Open, Rogowska won her first Grand Slam main-draw match since the 2009 French Open, defeating Sofia Arvidsson in straight sets, 6–3, 6–1. In the second round, Rogowska lost to world No. 5 and 2011 finalist, Li Na, 2–6, 2–6.

Rogowska then competed in three $25k events in Burnie, Launceston and Sydney. At the Burnie International, she was the second seed. She defeated qualifiers Lesly Kerkhove, Jang Su-jeong and Shuko Aoyama in the first round, second round and quarterfinal. In the semifinal, she defeated compatriot Bojana Bobusic 6–2, 6–4, and in the final she defeated Russian world number-one junior, Irina Khromacheva, to win her sixth ITF title. In Launceston, her good form looked like it was over in the first round before Rogowska's comeback to win 1–6, 7–5, 7–6 over Sandra Zaniewska. She then beat Arina Rodionova but lost the quarterfinal to Yulia Putintseva. In Sydney, Rogowska made the final by beating Akiko Omae, Monique Adamczak by walkover, Zheng Saisai, and qualifier Richèl Hogenkamp. In the final, she lost to Ashleigh Barty in straight sets.

In the main draw of the Malaysian Open, she won in the first round against Elitsa Kotsova 6–4, 6–0 which was her third WTA Tour main-draw win. She continued her good form into the second round upsetting defending champion Jelena Dokić 3–6, 6–4, 7–6, making the quarterfinals. In the quarterfinals, she lost to Eleni Daniilidou 2–6, 6–3, 2–6 although Rogowska won the second set after a rain delay. Rogowska then had first-round losses at the Indian Wells Open qualifying to Varvara Lepchenko 1–6, 3–6, and then in the main draw of the Miami Open to Stéphanie Foretz Gacon 4–6, 1–6.

Olivia played Fed Cup for the first time, taking on Germany in Germany in the World Group Playoffs. The team also included Samantha Stosur, Jarmila Gajdošová and Casey Dellacqua. Rogowska played in the second of the reverse singles but although pushing world No. 14, Angelique Kerber, she eventually lost 3–6, 3–6. She then had a few disappointing results in ITF tournaments in the USA on red clay. Olivia played her final French Open warm-up tournament at the Premier-level tournament the Brussels Open. She won her first qualifying match over Maryna Zanevska but lost her second round to Lenka Wienerová. Olivia then had a bad patch with a first-round qualifying defeat at the French Open then two disappointing results on grass. Then, Olivia lost in the second round of Wimbledon qualifying. She had some encouraging results in the American hardcourt season, including the US Open where she was initially placed in the qualifiers, but when she was receiving a wildcard to the main draw, after Dellacqua promoted to the last direct entry list just as qualifying matches was to be started. She finished with a first-round loss to Mandy Minella, in three sets.

After months away, Olivia returned home to Australia to play a string of $25k tournaments across the country. Her first one was in Rockhampton where she made the final with four straight-sets wins. Although having a tough start, she came back to defeat Sacha Jones 0–6, 6–3, 6–2 to win the tournament. The next week in Port Pirie, South Australia, she lost in the final to Jones who hadn't lost a set all week 2–6, 5–7. Two weeks later in her next $25k tournament in Esperance, she only lost one set all week and played a great final to defeat Ashleigh Barty 6–0, 6–3. She lost to Barty in a final in Sydney earlier in the year by nearly the same score.

=== 2013 ===
Due to big ranking improvements in 2012, Rogowska was awarded wildcards in Brisbane, Sydney and the Melbourne. In Brisbane, Rogowska drew qualifier Monica Puig and lost in straight sets. She was drawn to play world No. 13, Maria Kirilenko in Sydney. After a close first set, Rogowska eventually lost in straight sets. At the Australian Open, Rogowska played qualifier Vesna Dolonc but was defeated in an extremely close three-set match where she lost 6–8 in the final set.

Rogowska then headed to Burnie to defend the title she won in 2012 at the $25k Burnie International. As the top seed, she defeated Camilla Rosatello, Misa Eguchi, Arina Rodionova and Bojana Bobusic all in straight sets. In a windy final, she played Monique Adamczak and won a thriller 7–6, 6–7, 6–4. Staying in Tasmania, Rogowska made the quarterfinals of a $25k tournament in Launceston. But was stunned by eventual champion Storm Sanders in two close sets.

Rogowska then competed in qualifying at the Dubai Tennis Championships where she defeated Fatma Al-Nabhani in straight sets. She was crushed in the second round by world No. 28, Carla Suárez Navarro. Rogowska was given direct entry into the WTA event, the Malaysian Open where she lost in the first round against qualifier Luksika Kumkhum.

Rogowska then started to prepare for the French Open by playing six ITF events in Australia, Thailand, Slovak Republic and Czech Republic. Her best result coming in a $25k event in Bundaberg where she reached the quarterfinals going down to Yurika Sema in three sets. Her final tournament before the French Open was at the Brussels Open where she won her first round of qualifying against Valeria Solovyeva in straight sets. She then lost in two close sets against fourth seed CoCo Vandeweghe. At the French Open, Rogowska competed in qualifying where again defeated Solovyeva in straight sets. In the next round, she lost to fellow Australian and No. 20 seed Anastasia Rodionova.

Rogowska competed in qualifying at the US Open where she upset eighth seed Johanna Konta. She then defeated Richèl Hogenkamp in three close sets. She lost in the final round of qualifying against Maria João Koehler. However, Rogowska was awarded a lucky-loser place in the main draw after Ayumi Morita had to withdraw with a back injury. In the first round, she was defeated 6–0, 6–0 by fourth seed Sara Errani.

=== 2014 ===
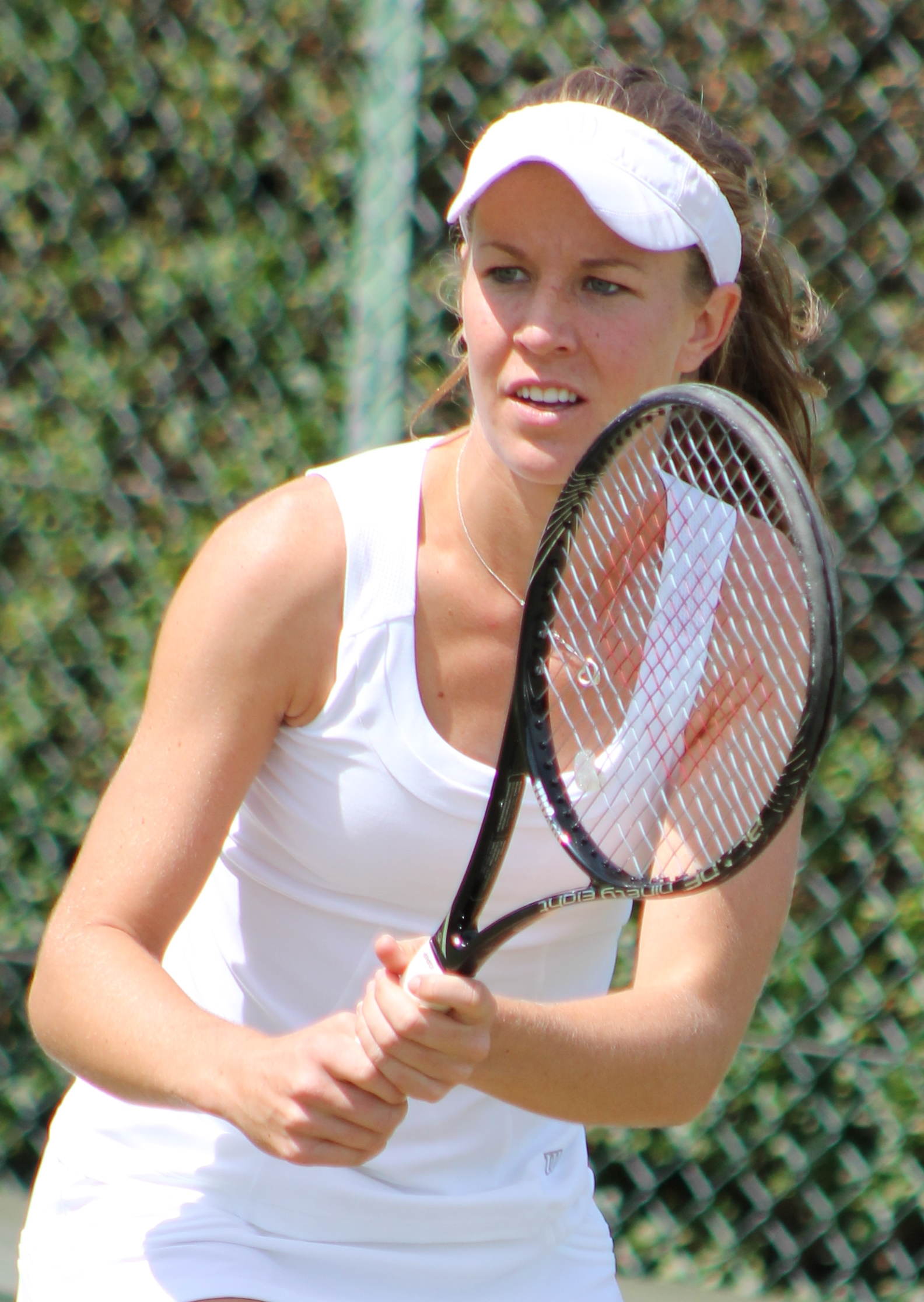
Rogowska in 2014

Rogowska began her year at the Brisbane International after receiving a wild card. She lost in the first round to Kimiko Date-Krumm. Rogowska then competed at the Hobart International, after being awarded a wildcard. She opened with a straight sets win over world No. 59, Alexandra Cadanțu. In the second round, Rogowska won the first set over eighth seed Bojana Jovanovski before she came storming back to easily win the next two sets. On 8 January, Rogowska was awarded a wildcard into the Australian Open. Rogowska won her first-round match over Mariana Duque in straight sets. This was her third Grand Slam first-round win. In the second round, she lost to Elina Svitolina.

Olivia returned to the ITF Circuit in Australia, playing two $50k events in Tasmania. She won the second event in Launceston, defeating Irena Pavlovic in the final. It was her first title at the $50k-level and the biggest of her career to date. She also won the doubles title with partner Adamczak, propelling her to a career-high doubles ranking of 106.

== ITF Circuit finals ==
=== Singles: 28 (16 titles, 12 runner-ups) ===
Legend
$50/60,000 tournaments
$25,000 tournaments

Result	W–L	Date	Tournament	Tier	Surface	Opponent	Score
Win	1–0	Dec 2008	ITF Sorrento, Australia	25,000	Hard	(Japan) Chiaki Okadaue	3–6, 6–4, 6–2
Loss	1–1	May 2009	ITF Bundaberg, Australia	25,000	Clay	(Australia) Anastasia Rodionova	5–7, 0–6
Win	2–1	Nov 2009	ITF Esperance, Australia	25,000	Hard	(Australia) Alicia Molik	6–1, 3–6, 6–2
Loss	2–2	Nov 2009	ITF Kalgoorlie, Australia	25,000	Hard	(Australia) Alicia Molik	6–7^{(6)}, 3–6
Win	3–2	Sep 2010	Darwin International, Australia	25,000	Hard	(United Kingdom) Naomi Cavaday	6–2, 2–6, 6–0
Loss	3–3	Apr 2011	ITF Bundaberg, Australia	25,000	Clay	(Australia) Casey Dellacqua	2–6, 3–6
Win	4–3	Sep 2011	ITF Alice Springs, Australia	25,000	Hard	(Australia) Isabella Holland	7–5, 7–5
Loss	4–4	Oct 2011	ITF Esperance, Australia	25,000	Hard	(Australia) Casey Dellacqua	2–6, 1–6
Win	5–4	Oct 2011	ITF Port Pirie, Australia	25,000	Hard	(Australia) Bojana Bobusic	6–3, 6–2
Win	6–4	Feb 2012	Burnie International, Australia	25,000	Hard	(Russia) Irina Khromacheva	6–3, 6–3
Loss	6–5	Feb 2012	ITF Sydney, Australia	25,000	Hard	(Australia) Ashleigh Barty	1–6, 3–6
Win	7–5	Sep 2012	ITF Rockhampton, Australia	25,000	Hard	(Australia) Sacha Jones	0–6, 6–3, 6–2
Loss	7–6	Sep 2012	ITF Port Pirie, Australia	25,000	Hard	(Australia) Sacha Jones	2–6, 5–7
Win	8–6	Oct 2012	ITF Esperance, Australia	25,000	Hard	(Australia) Ashleigh Barty	6–0, 6–3
Loss	8–7	Oct 2012	ITF Margaret River, Australia	25,000	Hard	(France) Victoria Larrière	3–6, 3–6
Loss	8–8	Oct 2012	Bendigo International, Australia	25,000	Hard	(Australia) Arina Rodionova	4–6, 5–7
Win	9–8	Feb 2013	Burnie International, Australia	25,000	Hard	(Australia) Monique Adamczak	7–6, 6–7, 6–4
Loss	9–9	Aug 2013	Landisville Tennis Challenge, US	25,000	Hard	(United States) Madison Brengle	2–6, 0–6
Win	10–9	Feb 2014	Launceston International, Australia	50,000	Hard	(France) Irena Pavlovic	5–7, 6–4, 6–0
Win	11–9	Jul 2014	Sacramento Challenger, US	50,000	Hard	(United States) Julia Boserup	6–2, 7–5
Loss	11–10	Feb 2015	ITF Campinas, Brazil	25,000	Clay	(Romania) Andreea Mitu	3–6, 6–3, 2–6
Win	12–10	Oct 2016	ITF Cairns, Australia	25,000	Hard	(Slovakia) Viktória Kužmová	6–1, 7–5
Win	13–10	Sep 2017	ITF Penrith, Australia	25,000	Hard	(Australia) Kimberly Birrell	6–2, 6–4
Win	14–10	Oct 2017	ITF Cairns, Australia	25,000	Hard	(Papua New Guinea) Abigail Tere-Apisah	1–6, 6–2, 6–2
Win	15–10	Nov 2017	Canberra International, Australia	60,000	Hard	(Australia) Destanee Aiava	6–1, 6–2
Loss	15–11	Nov 2017	Bendigo International, Australia	60,000	Hard	(Slovenia) Tamara Zidanšek	7–5, 1–6, 0–6
Loss	15–12	Nov 2018	Canberra International, Australia	60,000	Hard	(Australia) Zoe Hives	4–6, 2–6
Win	16–12	Mar 2019	Clay Court International, Australia	25,000	Clay	(Australia) Priscilla Hon	7–6^{(6)}, 6–3

=== Doubles: 27 (18 titles, 9 runner-ups) ===
Legend
$100,000 tournaments
$50,000 tournaments
$25,000 tournaments

Result	W–L	Date	Tournament	Surface	Partner	Opponents	Score
Win	1–0	May 2009	ITF Ipswich, Australia	Clay	(Japan) Maki Arai	(Australia) Tyra Calderwood (Australia) Shannon Golds	6–3, 6–2
Loss	1–1	Sep 2009	ITF Darwin, Australia	Hard	(Australia) Tyra Calderwood	(Australia) Nicole Kriz (Australia) Alicia Molik	3–6, 4–6
Win	2–1	Oct 2009	ITF Mount Gambier, Australia	Hard	(United Kingdom) Emily Webley-Smith	(Japan) Erika Sema (Japan) Yurika Sema	6–1, 5–7, [10–7]
Win	3–1	Nov 2009	ITF Esperance, Australia	Hard	(Australia) Shannon Golds	(Australia) Isabella Holland (Australia) Sally Peers	6–1, 6–1
Win	4–1	Jun 2010	ITF Rome, Italy	Clay	(United States) Christina McHale	(France) Iryna Brémond (Netherlands) Arantxa Rus	6–4, 6–1
Win	5–1	Sep 2010	ITF Cairns, Australia	Hard	(Australia) Tammi Patterson	(Australia) Tyra Calderwood (Thailand) Noppawan Lertcheewakarn	6–3, 7–6^{(3)}
Loss	5–2	Feb 2011	Burnie International, Australia	Hard	(Australia) Sally Peers	(Japan) Natsumi Hamamura (Japan) Erika Takao	2–6, 6–3, [7–10]
Win	6–2	Feb 2011	ITF Mildura, Australia	Grass	(Australia) Casey Dellacqua	(Japan) Rika Fujiwara (Japan) Kumiko Iijima	4–6, 7–6^{(6)}, [10–4]
Win	7–2	Mar 2011	ITF Sydney, Australia	Hard	(Australia) Casey Dellacqua	(Japan) Rika Fujiwara (Japan) Kumiko Iijima	3–6, 7–6^{(3)}, [10–4]
Win	8–2	Apr 2011	ITF Ipswich, Australia	Clay	(Australia) Casey Dellacqua	(Japan) Miki Miyamura (Japan) Mari Tanaka	6–4, 6–4
Win	9–2	Apr 2011	ITF Bundaberg, Australia	Clay	(Australia) Casey Dellacqua	(Australia) Daniella Jeflea (Poland) Sandra Zaniewska	7–5, 6–4
Win	10–2	Oct 2011	ITF Esperance, Australia	Hard	(Australia) Casey Dellacqua	(Australia) Monique Adamczak (Poland) Sandra Zaniewska	6–3, 6–2
Win	11–2	Oct 2011	ITF Kalgoorlie, Australia	Hard	(Australia) Casey Dellacqua	(China) Xu Yifan (China) Zhang Kailin	6–1, 6–1
Loss	11–3	Jul 2012	Lexington Open, United States	Hard	(Israel) Julia Glushko	(Japan) Shuko Aoyama (China) Xu Yifan	5–7, 7–6^{(4)}, [4–10]
Win	12–3	Aug 2012	Vancouver Open, Canada	Hard	(Israel) Julia Glushko	(United States) Jacqueline Cako (United States) Natalie Pluskota	6–4, 5–7, [10–7]
Loss	12–4	Oct 2012	ITF Esperance, Australia	Hard	(France) Victoria Larrière	(Australia) Ashleigh Barty (Australia) Sally Peers	6–4, 6–7^{(5)}, [4–10]
Win	13–4	Aug 2013	Landisville Challenge, US	Hard	(Australia) Monique Adamczak	(South Africa) Chanel Simmonds (United Kingdom) Emily Webley-Smith	6–2, 6–3
Loss	13–5	Oct 2013	Bendigo International, Australia	Hard	(Australia) Monique Adamczak	(Japan) Yurika Sema (Japan) Erika Sema	6–3, 2–6, [9–11]
Win	14–5	Nov 2013	Bendigo International, Australia	Hard	(Australia) Monique Adamczak	(Australia) Stephanie Bengson (Australia) Sally Peers	6–3, 2–6, [11–9]
Win	15–5	Feb 2014	Launceston International, Australia	Hard	(Australia) Monique Adamczak	(Thailand) Kamonwan Buayam (Slovakia) Zuzana Zlochová	6–2, 6–4
Loss	15–6	Apr 2014	Dothan Classic, US	Hard	(United States) Shelby Rogers	(Estonia) Anett Kontaveit (Belarus) Ilona Kremen	1–6, 7–5, [5–10]
Win	16–6	Jul 2014	ITF Carson, US	Hard	(Netherlands) Michaëlla Krajicek	(United States) Samantha Crawford (United States) Sachia Vickery	7–6^{(4)}, 6–1
Win	17–6	Feb 2015	ITF Campinas, Brazil	Clay	(France) Pauline Parmentier	(Venezuela) Andrea Gámiz (Brazil) Paula Cristina Gonçalves	7–5, 4–6, [10–8]
Win	18–6	Sep 2016	ITF Tweed Heads, Australia	Hard	(Australia) Monique Adamczak	(Australia) Naiktha Bains (Australia) Abbie Myers	7–6^{(6)}, 7–6^{(3)}
Loss	18–7	Feb 2017	ITF Perth, Australia	Hard	(Australia) Tammi Patterson	(Japan) Junri Namigata (Japan) Riko Sawayanagi	6–4, 5–7, [6–10]
Loss	18–8	Sep 2017	ITF Penrith, Australia	Hard	(Australia) Tammi Patterson	(Australia) Naiktha Bains (Papua New Guinea) Abigail Tere-Apisah	0–6, 5–7
Loss	18–9	Mar 2019	ITF Mildura, Australia	Grass	(Australia) Storm Sanders	(Australia) Alana Parnaby (Australia) Alicia Smith	6–3, 3–6, [8–10]

== Grand Slam performance timelines ==
Key
W	F	SF	QF	#R	RR	Q#	DNQ	A	NH

(W) winner; (F) finalist; (SF) semifinalist; (QF) quarterfinalist; (#R) rounds 4, 3, 2, 1; (RR) round-robin stage; (Q#) qualification round; (DNQ) did not qualify; (A) absent; (NH) not held; (SR) strike rate (events won / competed); (W–L) win–loss record.
To avoid confusion and double counting, these charts are updated at the conclusion of a tournament or when the player's participation has ended.

=== Singles ===
Tournament	2008	2009	2010	2011	2012	2013	2014	2015	2016	2017	2018	2019	2020	W–L
Australian Open	Q1	1R	1R	1R	2R	1R	2R	1R	Q1	Q3	2R	Q2	Q1	3–8
French Open	A	2R	Q1	Q1	Q1	Q2	Q3	1R	Q1	A	Q1	A	A	1–2
Wimbledon	A	Q3	Q1	A	Q2	Q1	Q1	Q1	A	A	A	A	A	0–0
US Open	A	1R	Q1	Q1	1R	1R	Q2	A	A	A	Q1	A	A	0–3
Win–Loss	0–0	1–3	0–1	0–1	1–2	0–2	1–1	0–2	0–0	0–0	1–1	0–0	0–0	4–13
Year-end ranking	491	154	211	178	114	166	131	274	278	186	211	291	340	

=== Doubles ===
Tournament	2009	2010	2011	2012	2013	2014	2015	2016	2017	2018	W–L
Australian Open	1R	1R	1R	1R	1R	3R	2R	1R	A	A	3–8
French Open	A	A	A	A	A	A	A	A	A	A	0–0
Wimbledon	A	A	A	Q2	A	Q1	A	A	A	A	0–0
US Open	A	A	A	A	A	A	A	A	A	A	0–0
Win–Loss	0–1	0–1	0–1	0–1	0–1	2–1	1–1	0–1	0–0	0–0	3–8
Year-end ranking	286	200	161	201	175	96	272	305	412	599	
