= Macall Harkins =

American tennis player

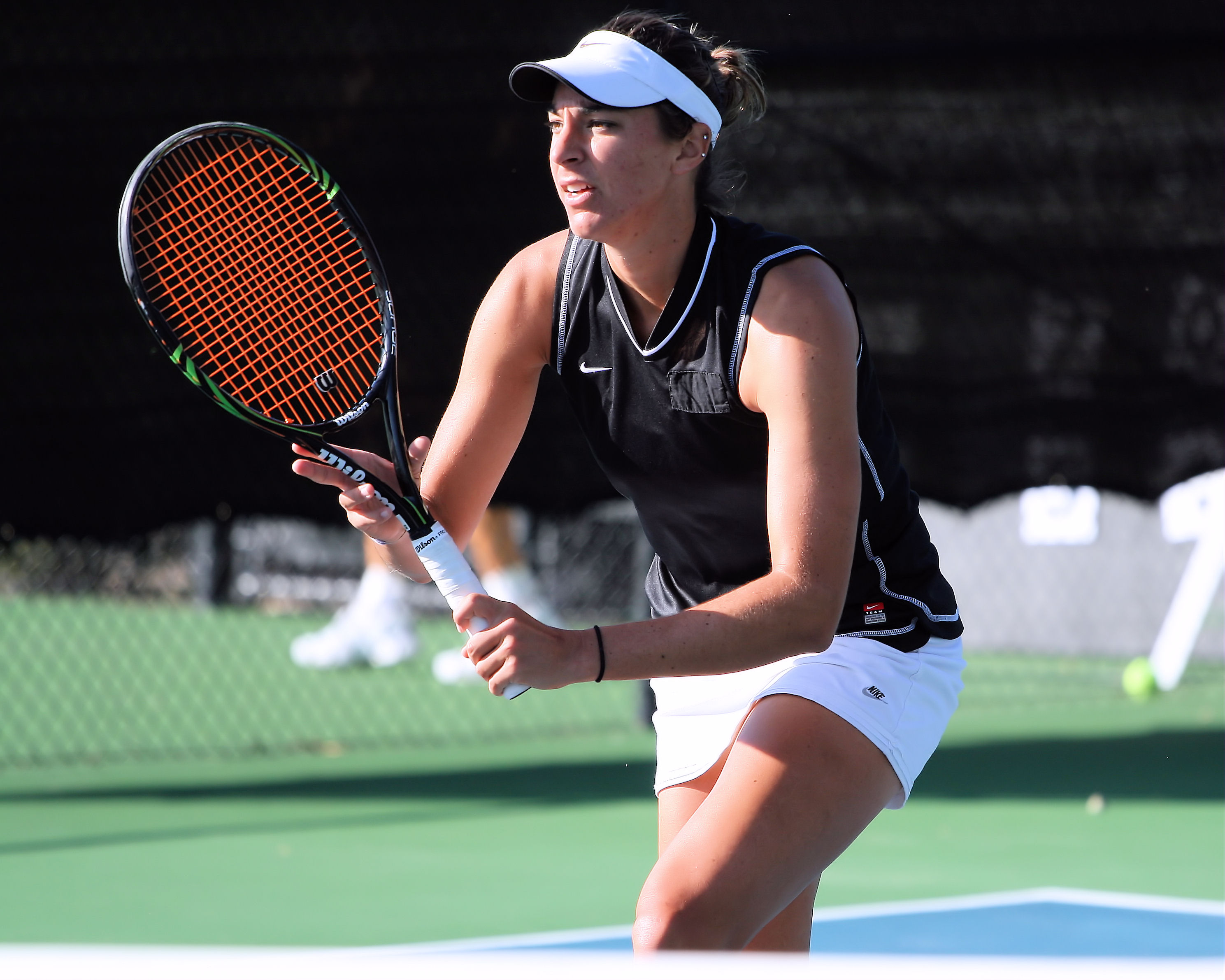
- Country (sports): United States
- Born: February 5, 1986 (age 39) Palos Verdes, California, U.S.
- Plays: Left-handed (two-handed backhand)
- Prize money: $42,123

Singles
- Career record: 101–81
- Career titles: 3 ITF
- Highest ranking: No. 377 (September 27, 2010)

Doubles
- Career record: 103–69
- Career titles: 9 ITF
- Highest ranking: No. 222 (October 10, 2011)

Macall Harkins (born February 5, 1986) is an American former professional tennis player.

She won three singles and nine doubles titles on the ITF Circuit in her career. On 27 September 2010, she reached her best singles ranking of world No. 377. On 10 October 2011, she peaked at No. 222 in the doubles rankings.

== ITF Circuit finals ==
$50,000 tournaments
$25,000 tournaments
$10,000 tournaments

=== Singles: 3 (3 titles) ===
Result	No.	Date	Tournament	Surface	Opponent	Score
Win	1.	October 18, 2009	ITF Mexico City	Hard	(Colombia) Paula Zabala	7–5, 6–4
Win	2.	March 14, 2010	ITF Metepec, Mexico	Hard	(Brazil) Maria Fernanda Alves	6–1, 6–3
Win	3.	August 29, 2010	ITF San Luis Potosí, Mexico	Hard	(Belarus) Sasha Khabibulina	6–1, 6–4

=== Doubles: 15 (9 titles, 6 runner-ups) ===
Result	No.	Date	Tournament	Surface	Partner	Opponents	Score
Loss	1.	21 June 2009	ITF Brownsville, United States	Hard	(United States) Ester Goldfeld	(New Zealand) Sacha Jones (United States) Ashley Weinhold	3–6, 3–6
Win	2.	27 June 2009	ITF Wichita, United States	Hard	(United States) Ester Goldfeld	(United States) Sabrina Capannolo (United States) Elizabeth Lumpkin	7–6^{(5)}, 6–4
Loss	3.	24 April 2010	ITF Poza Rica, Mexico	Hard	(Brazil) Vivian Segnini	(United States) Lauren Albanese (United States) Julia Cohen	3–6, 6–7^{(6)}
Win	4.	29 August 2010	ITF San Luis Potosí, Mexico	Hard	(Austria) Nicole Rottmann	(Argentina) Andrea Benítez (United States) Nadia Echeverría Alam	6–1, 6–4
Loss	5.	7 March 2011	ITF Irapuato, Mexico	Hard	(Austria) Nicole Rottmann	(Hungary) Tímea Babos (United Kingdom) Johanna Konta	3–6, 4–6
Win	6.	27 March 2011	ITF Poza Rica, Mexico	Hard	(Austria) Nicole Rottmann	(Brazil) Teliana Pereira (Brazil) Fernanda Hermenegildo	6–2, 6–4
Win	7.	31 May 2011	ITF Hilton Head, United States	Hard	(United States) Amanda McDowell	(United States) Whitney Jones (United States) Alexandra Mueller	6–3, 6–3
Win	8.	14 May 2012	ITF Landisville, United States	Hard	(Chinese Taipei) Hsu Chieh-yu	(Canada) Gabriela Dabrowski (United States) Alexandra Mueller	6–3, 6–4
Win	9.	29 July 2012	ITF New Orleans, United States	Hard	(United States) Zoë Gwen Scandalis	(United States) Roxanne Ellison (United States) Sierra Ellison	7–5, 6–2
Win	10.	5 August 2012	ITF Fort Worth, United States	Hard	(New Zealand) Dianne Hollands	(United States) Anamika Bhargava (United States) Elizabeth Ferris	7–6^{(6)}, 6–4
Loss	11.	14 September 2012	ITF Redding, United States	Hard	(Chinese Taipei) Hsu Chieh-yu	(United States) Jacqueline Cako (United States) Sanaz Marand	6–7^{(5)}, 5–7
Loss	12.	17 February 2013	ITF Rancho Santa Fe, United States	Hard	(United States) Anamika Bhargava	(United States) Allie Will (United States) Asia Muhammad	1–6, 4–6
Win	13.	18 March 2013	ITF Metepec, Mexico	Hard	(Austria) Nicole Rottmann	(Mexico) Marcela Zacarías (Brazil) Laura Pigossi	6–3, 6–2
Win	14.	10 June 2013	ITF Quintana Roo, Mexico	Hard	(United States) Zoë Gwen Scandalis	(Argentina) Victoria Bosio (Paraguay) Montserrat González	6–4, 3–6, [10–6]
Loss	15.	25 May 2014	ITF Hilton Head, United States	Hard	(United States) Lauren Albanese	(Canada) Sonja Molnar (United States) Caitlin Whoriskey	3–6, 4–6
