= Julia Boserup =

American tennis player (born 1991)

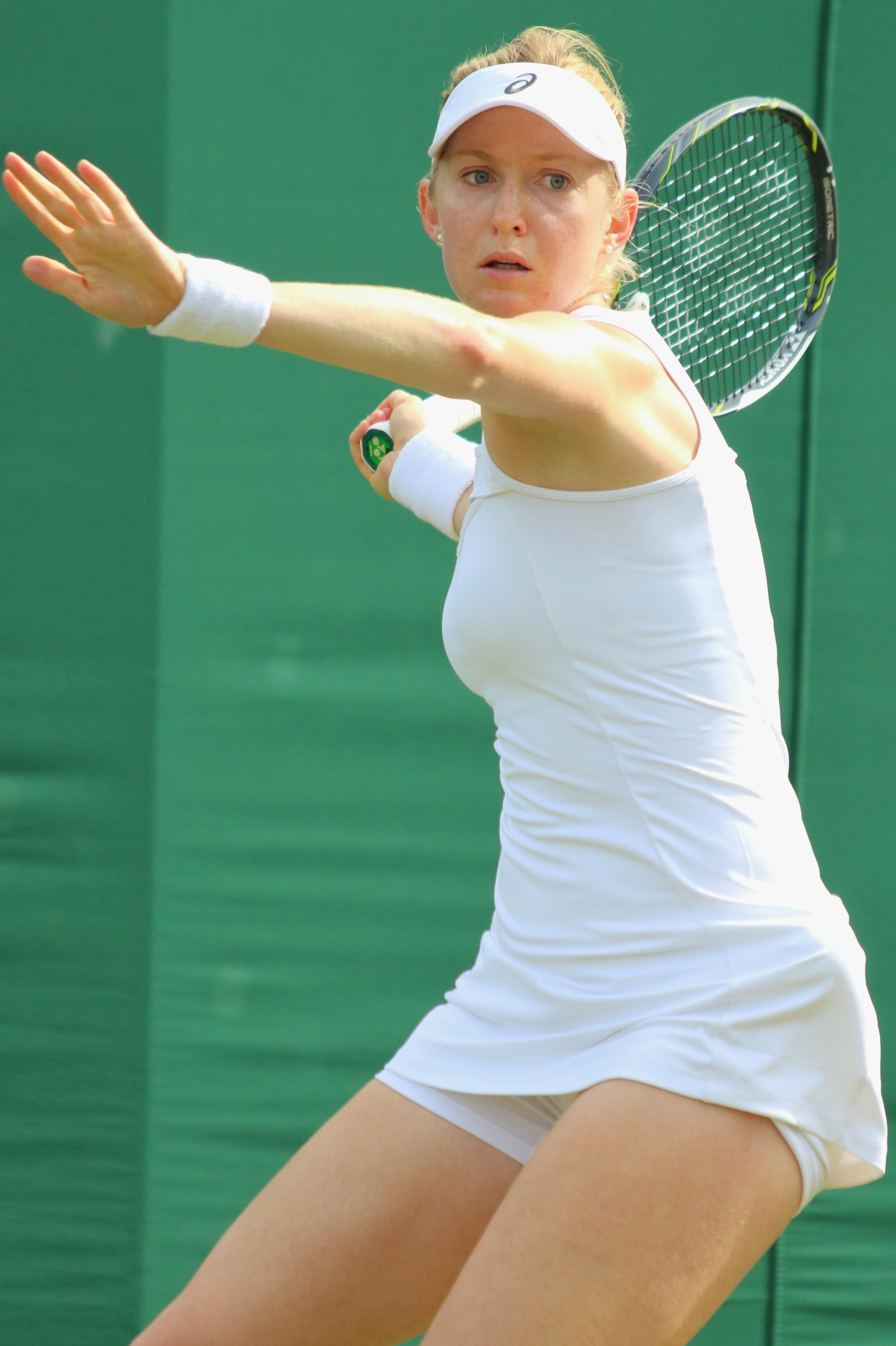
- Boserup at the 2017 Wimbledon Championships
- Country (sports): United States
- Residence: Newport Beach, California, U.S.
- Born: September 9, 1991 (age 35) Santa Monica, California, U.S.
- Height: 1.81 m (5 ft 11 in)
- Turned pro: 2008
- Retired: 2019
- Plays: Right-handed (two-handed backhand)

Singles
- Career record: 212–218
- Career titles: 3 ITF
- Highest ranking: No. 80 (June 26, 2017)

Grand Slam singles results
- Australian Open: 2R (2017)
- French Open: 1R (2017)
- Wimbledon: 3R (2016)
- US Open: 1R (2017)

Doubles
- Career record: 48–70
- Career titles: 1 ITF
- Highest ranking: No. 218 (October 23, 2017)

Julia Boserup (born September 9, 1991) is an American retired tennis player.

Boserup was born in Santa Monica, California to two Danish parents and began working with famed coach Robert Lansdorp at the age of 6. She moved to Boca Raton, Florida, at age 13 to train at the USTA's National Training Center. Boserup turned professional in 2008.

Boserup reached the third round of the 2016 Wimbledon Championships and achieved her highest WTA singles ranking of world No. 80 in 2017.

After suffering multiple injuries over 11 years on Tour, Boserup announced her retirement from professional tennis in May 2019.

After her retirement from professional tennis Boserup earned her MBA from the University of Chicago Booth School of Business. After graduating from Booth, Boserup joined global business advisory firm A.T. Kearney as a Management Consultant. In 2024, Boserup was elected to the board of directors of the WTA, where she currently serves as the 1-100+ Singles and Doubles-Only Representative. Since October 2024, Boserup has served as the chief executive officer of the Women's Tennis Benefit Association (WTBA).

== Junior accomplishments ==
Boserup won the USTA Orange Bowl in 2008, outlasting fellow American Christina McHale in three sets, in the final match.

== Professional career ==
Boserup reached the third round of the 2016 Wimbledon Championships and in 2017 she defeated French Open champion Francesca Schiavone in the first round of the Australian Open. In 2014, Julia reached the quarterfinals of the WTA Tour event in Monterrey, Mexico, defeating world No. 24, Kirsten Flipkens, in the first round.

In her professional career, Boserup competed mainly on the ITF Women's Circuit where she won three singles titles and one doubles title. After qualifying, Boserup made her Grand Slam main-draw debut at the 2016 Wimbledon Championships, where she defeated Tatjana Maria in the first round. In the second round, Boserup triumphed over Belinda Bencic due to a second set retirement before she was beaten by Elena Vesnina. In 2011, Boserup competed as a qualifier in the US Open, losing in the first qualifying round to Elitsa Kostova. In early 2012, Boserup also competed as a qualifier at the Australian Open, winning two matches before falling in the third round of qualifying.

== ITF finals ==
Legend
$75,000 tournaments
$50,000 tournaments
$25,000 tournaments

=== Singles (3–3) ===
Result	No.	Date	Tournament	Surface	Opponent	Score
Loss	1.	Jul 2011	Waterloo Challenger, Canada	Clay	(Canada) Sharon Fichman	3–6, 6–4, 4–6
Win	1.	Sep 2011	ITF Redding, United States	Hard	(Russia) Olga Puchkova	6–4, 2–6, 6–3
Loss	2.	Oct 2011	Saguenay Challenger, Canada	Hard (i)	(Hungary) Tímea Babos	6–7, 3–6
Win	2.	Jan 2012	Rancho Santa Fe Open, United States	Hard	(United States) Lauren Davis	6–0, 6–3
Loss	3.	Jul 2014	Sacramento Challenger, United States	Hard	(Australia) Olivia Rogowska	2–6, 5–7
Win	3.	May 2015	ITF Raleigh, United States	Clay	(United States) Samantha Crawford	6–3, 6–2

=== Doubles (1–3) ===
Result	No.	Date	Tournament	Surface	Partner	Opponents	Score
Loss	1.	Oct 2009	ITF Kansas, United States	Hard	(United States) Laura Granville	(United States) Lilia Osterloh (Georgia (country)) Anna Tatishvili	0–6, 3–6
Loss	2.	Nov 2010	ITF Phoenix, United States	Hard	(United States) Sloane Stephens	(United States) Tetiana Luzhanska (United States) CoCo Vandeweghe	5–7, 4–6
Loss	3.	Nov 2013	ITF Captiva Island, United States	Hard	(United States) Alexandra Mueller	(Canada) Gabriela Dabrowski (United States) Allie Will	1–6, 2–6
Win	1.	Sep 2015	Las Vegas Open, United States	Hard	(United States) Nicole Gibbs	(Brazil) Paula Cristina Gonçalves (United States) Sanaz Marand	6–3, 6–4

Sporting positions
Preceded by (Portugal) Michelle Larcher de Brito	Orange Bowl Girls' Singles Champion; Category: 18 and under 2008	Succeeded by (Canada) Gabriela Dabrowski
