= Natalie Pluskota =

American tennis player

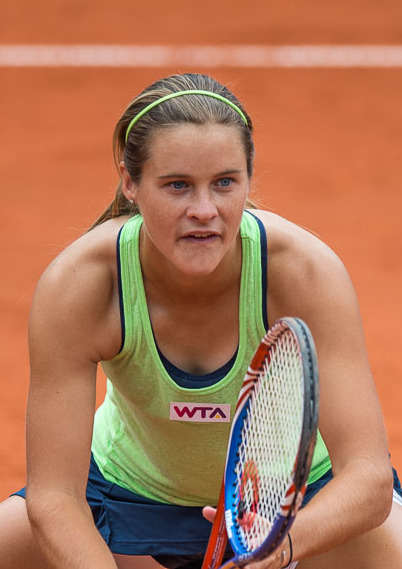
- Pluskota at the 2014 Nürnberger Versicherungscup
- Full name: Natalie Ann Pluskota
- Country (sports): United States
- Born: November 2, 1989 (age 35) Newnan, Georgia, U.S.
- Height: 5 ft 10 in (1.78 m)
- Retired: 2016
- Prize money: $30,523

Singles
- Career record: 47–47
- Career titles: 0
- Highest ranking: No. 478 (July 8, 2013)

Doubles
- Career record: 72–56
- Career titles: 4 ITF
- Highest ranking: No. 157 (September 16, 2013)

Natalie Ann Pluskota (born November 2, 1989) is an American former tennis player.

In her career, Pluskota won four doubles titles on the ITF Women's Circuit. On July 8, 2013, she reached her best singles ranking of world No. 478. On September 16, 2013, she peaked at No. 157 in the WTA doubles rankings.

In February 2016, Pluskota announced her retirement via Facebook.

== ITF finals ==
=== Singles (0–1) ===
Legend $25,000 tournaments $10,000 tournaments	Finals by surface Hard (0–1) Clay (0–0)

Result	Date	Tier	Tournament	Surface	Opponent	Score
Loss	May 13, 2013	10,000	ITF Landisville, United States	Hard	(Russia) Alisa Kleybanova	3–6, 0–6

=== Doubles (4–5) ===
Legend $100,000 tournaments $75,000 tournaments $25,000 tournaments $10,000 tournaments	Finals by surface Hard (4–4) Clay (0–1)

Result	No.	Date	Tier	Tournament	Surface	Partner	Opponents	Score
Loss	1.	June 1, 2009	10,000	ITF Hilton Head, United States	Hard	(United States) Caitlin Whoriskey	(United States) Jacqueline Cako (United States) Alison Riske	3–6, 6–3, [6–10]
Win	1.	July 11, 2011	10,000	ITF Atlanta, United States	Hard	(United States) Alexandra Cercone	(United States) Alexandra Hirsch (United States) Amanda McDowell	7–5, 4–6, [10–8]
Loss	2.	July 16, 2012	10,000	ITF Evansville, United States	Hard	(United States) Mallory Burdette	(China) Duan Yingying (China) Xu Yifan	2–6, 3–6
Loss	3.	July 30, 2012	100,000	Vancouver Open, Canada	Hard	(United States) Jacqueline Cako	(Israel) Julia Glushko (Australia) Olivia Rogowska	4–6, 7–5, [7–10]
Win	2.	October 15, 2012	25,000	ITF Rock Hill, United States	Hard	(United States) Jacqueline Cako	(United States) Hsu Chieh-yu (United States) Chiara Scholl	6–2, 6–3
Win	3.	November 5, 2012	75,000	Phoenix Classic, United States	Hard	(United States) Jacqueline Cako	(Canada) Eugenie Bouchard (Norway) Ulrikke Eikeri	6–3, 2–6, [10–4]
Loss	4.	July 29, 2013	100,000	Vancouver Open, Canada	Hard	(United States) Jacqueline Cako	(Canada) Sharon Fichman (Ukraine) Maryna Zanevska	2–6, 2–6
Loss	5.	March 10, 2014	10,000	ITF Orlando, United States	Clay	(Australia) Sally Peers	(United States) CiCi Bellis (United States) Alexis Nelson	2–6, 6–0, [9–11]
Win	4.	July 14, 2014	10,000	ITF Evansville, United States	Hard	(United States) Brooke Austin	(United States) Catherine Harrison (United States) Mary Weatherholt	6–4, 3–6, [11–9]
