= Zoë Gwen Scandalis =

American tennis player

Zoë Gwen Scandalis (born 21 September 1993) is an American former professional tennis player.

She won five doubles titles on the ITF Women's Circuit in her career. On 22 August 2011, she reached her best singles ranking of world No. 711. On 29 June 2015, she peaked at No. 494 in the doubles rankings.

Scandalis made her WTA Tour debut at the 2011 Southern California Open when she qualified for the main draw.

== ITF Circuit finals ==
$50,000 tournaments
$10,000 tournaments

=== Doubles: 7 (5 titles, 2 runner-ups) ===
Outcome	No.	Date	Tournament	Surface	Partner	Opponents	Score
Winner	1.	29 July 2012	ITF New Orleans, United States	Hard	(United States) Macall Harkins	(United States) Roxanne Ellison (United States) Sierra Ellison	7–5, 6–2
Winner	2.	10 June 2013	ITF Quintana Roo, Mexico	Hard	(United States) Macall Harkins	(Argentina) Victoria Bosio (Paraguay) Montserrat González	6–4, 3–6, [10–6]
Runner-up	1.	13 July 2014	ITF Sacramento, United States	Hard	(United States) Maria Sanchez	(Australia) Daria Gavrilova (Australia) Storm Sanders	2–6, 1–6
Winner	3.	21 June 2015	ITF Manzanillo, Mexico	Hard	(Mexico) Renata Zarazúa	(Chile) Bárbara Gatica (Argentina) Stephanie Petit	6–1, 6–2
Winner	4.	28 June 2015	ITF Manzanillo, Mexico	Hard	(Mexico) Camila Fuentes	(Mexico) Carolina Betancourt (Chile) Daniela Seguel	6–3, 5–7, [12–10]
Runner-up	2.	17 January 2016	ITF Fort de France, Martinique	Hard	(United States) Emina Bektas	(Romania) Jaqueline Cristian (Italy) Gaia Sanesi	6–7^{(5)}, 6–7^{(5)}
Winner	5.	10 December 2017	ITF Stellenbosch, South Africa	Hard	(United States) Monica Robinson	(Canada) Petra Januskova (United States) Madeleine Kobelt	2–6, 6–4, [10–4]
