= Caitlin Whoriskey =

American tennis player

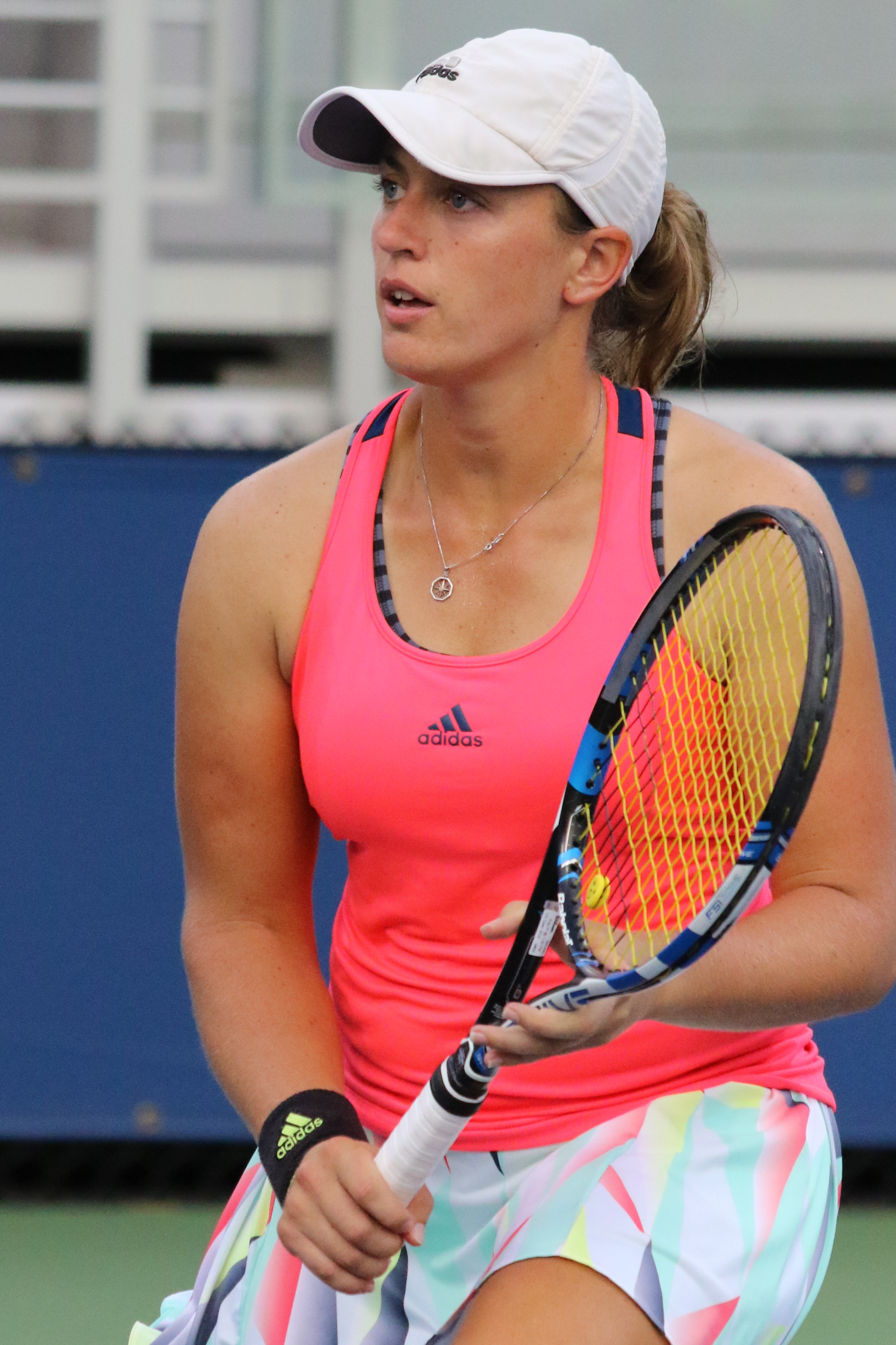
- Whoriskey at the 2016 US Open
- Country (sports): United States
- Residence: East Sandwich, Massachusetts, U.S.
- Born: February 19, 1988 (age 37) Boston, Massachusetts, U.S.
- Height: 1.74 m (5 ft 8 1/2 in)
- Turned pro: 2010
- Plays: Right (one-handed backhand)
- Prize money: $132,970

Singles
- Career record: 197–152
- Career titles: 2 ITF
- Highest ranking: No. 268 (May 18, 2015)

Doubles
- Career record: 215–151
- Career titles: 18 ITF
- Highest ranking: No. 109 (April 10, 2017)

Grand Slam doubles results
- Wimbledon: 1R (2017)
- US Open: 1R (2016)

Caitlin Whoriskey (born February 19, 1988) is an American former professional tennis player. She played collegiately at the University of Tennessee, where she was a three-time All-American.

Whoriskey finished runner-up in doubles at the 2010 NCAA Women's Tennis Championship, playing with Natalie Pluskota. She recorded a victory in her first-ever ITF tournament as a professional, partnering with Kaitlyn Christian and taking the doubles crown at the 2010 Mt. Pleasant Pro Classic.

== Personal life ==
On November 4, 2023 Caitlin married her long-time boyfriend Brett Rolison, DPT.

== College career ==
Whoriskey played her college tennis for co-head coaches Mike Patrick and Sonia-Hahn Patrick at the University of Tennessee. She recorded 92 singles victories and 113 doubles wins in her four years at UT. Her doubles total ranks fourth in school history. She was a three-time ITA All-America selection: twice in doubles (2009–10) and once in singles (2009). She captured the doubles championship at the ITA All-American Championships in 2007 and 2009, the first such wins in school history. A three time All-SEC selection, she helped lead Tennessee on its deepest postseason run since 2002 during the 2009–10 season, when the Lady Vols advanced to the quarterfinals of the NCAA Championships. Paired with teammate Natalie Pluskota, she reached the finals of the 2010 NCAA Women's Doubles Championship before falling to Hilary Barte and Lindsay Burdette of Stanford. She was named ITA National Senior Player of the Year for the 2009–10 season.

== Professional career ==
Whoriskey recorded her first-ever professional title in June 2010, winning the doubles crown at the 2010 Mt. Pleasant Women's Pro Classic, defeating Petra Rampre and Shelby Rogers in the final round. She followed that up with another doubles title at the Ladies Cleveland Open on June 27.

Partnering Ashley Weinhold, Whoriskey made her Grand Slam tournament debut as wildcard entrants in the women's doubles at the 2016 US Open, losing in the first round to 10th seeds Vania King and Monica Niculescu in three sets.

== ITF Circuit finals ==
=== Singles: 9 (2 titles, 7 runner-ups) ===
Legend $25,000 tournaments $10,000 tournaments	Finals by surface Hard (2–6) Clay (0–1)

Result	No.	Date	Tournament	Surface	Opponent	Score
Loss	1.	July 27, 2009	ITF St. Joseph, United States	Hard	(United States) Irina Falconi	3–6, 3–6
Loss	2.	January 16, 2012	ITF Coimbra, Portugal	Hard	(Russia) Ulyana Ayzatulina	5–7, 1–6
Loss	3.	August 13, 2012	ITF Ratingen, Germany	Clay	(Germany) Laura Siegemund	2–6, 1–6
Loss	4.	April 29, 2013	ITF Antalya, Turkey	Hard	(Romania) Ana Bogdan	6–7, 4–6
Loss	5.	May 6, 2013	ITF Antalya, Turkey	Hard	(Brazil) Carla Forte	6–7, 5–7
Win	1.	May 25, 2014	ITF Hilton Head, United States	Hard	(Belgium) Elise Mertens	6–3, 7–6
Loss	6.	July 14, 2014	ITF Evansville, United States	Hard	(United States) Tornado Alicia Black	4–6, 6–4, 6–2
Loss	7.	July 3, 2016	ITF El Paso, United States	Hard	(United States) Jamie Loeb	5–7, 3–6
Win	2.	August 6, 2016	ITF Fort Worth, United States	Hard	(United Kingdom) Tara Moore	6–0, 6–4

=== Doubles: 33 (18 titles, 15 runner-ups) ===
Legend $100,000 tournaments $75,000 tournaments $50/60,000 tournaments $25,000 tournaments $10,000 tournaments	Finals by surface Hard (13–11) Clay (5–4) Grass (0–0) Carpet (0–0)

Result	No.	Date	Tournament	Surface	Partner	Opponents	Score
Loss	1.	Jun 2009	ITF Hilton Head, United States	Hard	(United States) Natalie Pluskota	(United States) Jacqueline Cako (United States) Alison Riske	3–6, 6–3, [6–10]
Loss	2.	Jul 2009	ITF St. Joseph, United States	Hard	(United States) Chelsea Orr	(United States) Irina Falconi (United States) Ashley Weinhold	4–6, 6–7
Win	1.	Jun 2010	ITF Mt. Pleasant, United States	Hard	(United States) Kaitlyn Christian	(Slovenia) Petra Rampre (United States) Shelby Rogers	6–4, 6–2
Win	2.	Jun 2010	ITF Cleveland, United States	Clay	(United States) Sanaz Marand	(United States) Emily Harman (United States) Eleanor Peters	6–4, 6–0
Loss	3.	Oct 2010	ITF Rock Hill, United States	Hard	(United States) Sanaz Marand	(Brazil) Maria Fernanda Alves (Colombia) Mariana Duque	1–6, 6–4, 4–6
Win	3.	Nov 2011	ITF Sunderland, United Kingdom	Hard	(Netherlands) Eva Wacanno	(Czech Republic) Martina Borecka (Czech Republic) Petra Krejsová	6–2, 4–6, 6–3
Win	4.	Apr 2012	Wiesbaden Open, Germany	Clay	(Germany) Laura Siegemund	(Russia) Alexandra Romanova (Poland) Sylwia Zagórska	6–0, 6–0
Win	5.	May 2012	ITF Warsaw, Poland	Clay	(Belgium) Elyne Boeykens	(Poland) Karolina Kosińska (Poland) Aleksandra Rosolska	6–2, 6–2
Win	6.	Jun 2012	ITF Alkmaar, Netherlands	Clay	(Belgium) Elyne Boeykens	(Germany) Carolin Daniels (Belarus) Sviatlana Pirazhenka	6–2, 6–4
Loss	4.	Apr 2013	ITF Antalya, Turkey	Hard	(United States) Rosalia Alda	(Argentina) Andrea Benítez (Brazil) Carla Forte	6–4, 5–7, [4–10]
Loss	5.	Sep 2013	Las Vegas Open, United States	Hard	(United States) Denise Mureşan	(Austria) Tamira Paszek (United States) CoCo Vandeweghe	4–6, 2–6
Loss	6.	May 2014	ITF Sumter, United States	Hard	(Canada) Sonja Molnar	(United States) Sophie Chang (United States) Andie Daniell	1–6, 3–6
Win	7.	May 2014	ITF Hilton Head, United States	Hard	(Canada) Sonja Molnar	(United States) Lauren Albanese (United States) Macall Harkins	6–3, 6–4
Loss	7.	Oct 2014	Challenger de Saguenay, Canada	Hard (i)	(Canada) Sonja Molnar	(Belgium) Ysaline Bonaventure (United Kingdom) Nicola Slater	4–6, 4–6
Win	8.	Apr 2015	ITF Jackson, United States	Clay	(Chile) Alexa Guarachi	(Czech Republic) Kateřina Kramperová (Australia) Jessica Moore	6–7^{(4)}, 6–3, [11–9]
Win	9.	Jul 2015	Sacramento Challenger, United States	Hard	(United States) Ashley Weinhold	(Japan) Nao Hibino (Canada) Rosie Johanson	6–4, 3–6, [14–12]
Win	10.	Sep 2015	ITF Redding, United States	Hard	(United States) Ashley Weinhold	(South Africa) Michelle Sammons (Thailand) Varatchaya Wongteanchai	6–2, 7–5
Loss	8.	Apr 2016	ITF Pelham, United States	Clay	(United States) Sophie Chang	(United States) Asia Muhammad (United States) Taylor Townsend	2–6, 3–6
Loss	9.	Apr 2016	ITF Dothan, United States	Clay	(United States) Keri Wong	(United States) Asia Muhammad (United States) Taylor Townsend	0–6, 1–6
Win	11	Jun 2016	ITF Sumter, United States	Hard	(United States) Ashley Weinhold	(United States) Jamie Loeb (Canada) Carol Zhao	7–6^{(5)}, 6–1
Win	12	Jul 2016	ITF El Paso, United States	Hard	(United States) Ashley Weinhold	(United States) Sanaz Marand (Canada) Carol Zhao	6–4, 7–6^{(3)}
Win	13	Jul 2016	Sacramento Challenger, United States	Hard	(United States) Ashley Weinhold	(United States) Jamie Loeb (South Africa) Chanel Simmonds	6–4, 6–4
Loss	10	Nov 2016	Toronto Challenger, Canada	Hard (i)	(United States) Ashley Weinhold	(Canada) Gabriela Dabrowski (Netherlands) Michaëlla Krajicek	4–6, 3–6
Win	14	Feb 2017	Midland Tennis Classic, United States	Hard (i)	(United States) Ashley Weinhold	(United States) Kayla Day (United States) Caroline Dolehide	7–6^{(1)}, 6–3
Win	15	Sep 2017	ITF Stillwater, United States	Hard	(Serbia) Jovana Jakšić	(United Kingdom) Harriet Dart (Belgium) An-Sophie Mestach	4–6, 6–4, [10–3]
Loss	11	Oct 2017	ITF Sumter, United States	Hard	(United States) Alexandra Mueller	(United States) Jessica Pegula (United States) Taylor Townsend	6–4, 5–7, [5–10]
Loss	12	Nov 2017	ITF Norman, United States	Hard	(United States) Maria Sanchez	(United States) Chiara Scholl (Belgium) Tamaryn Hendler	6–3, 3–6, [6–10]
Loss	13	Feb 2018	ITF Surprise, United States	Hard	(United States) Jacqueline Cako	(Japan) Misaki Doi (Belgium) Yanina Wickmayer	6–2, 3–6, [8–10]
Loss	14	Apr 2019	ITF Jackson, United States	Clay	(United States) Hanna Chang	(Poland) Katarzyna Kawa (Poland) Katarzyna Piter	5–7, 1–6
Win	16	Jun 2019	ITF Sumter, United States	Hard	(United States) Brynn Boren	(Montenegro) Vladica Babić (United States) Hayley Carter	6–4, 6–4
Win	17	Jul 2019	Ashland Classic, United States	Hard	(United States) Sanaz Marand	(Montenegro) Vladica Babić (Sweden) Julia Rosenqvist	7–6^{(4)}, 6–4
Win	18	Sep 2019	ITF Templeton Pro, United States	Hard	(Montenegro) Vladica Babic	(Romania) Gabriela Talabă (Mexico) Marcela Zacarías	6–4, 6–2
Loss	15	Oct 2019	ITF Charleston Pro, United States	Clay	(Montenegro) Vladica Babic	(Kazakhstan) Anna Danilina (United States) Ingrid Neel	1–6, 1–6
