= Ashley Weinhold =

American tennis player (born 1989)

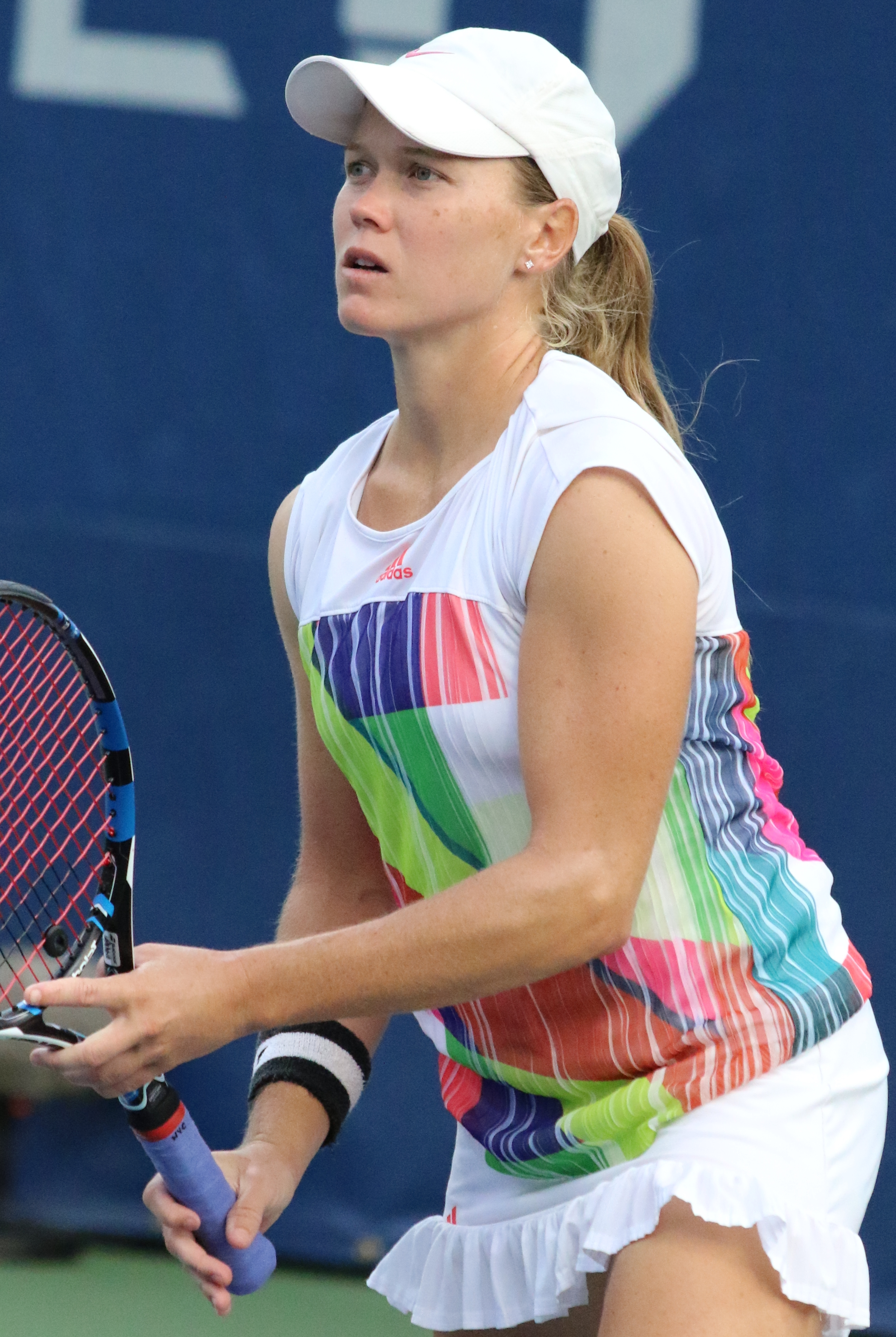
- Weinhold at the 2016 US Open
- Country (sports): United States
- Residence: Spicewood, Texas
- Born: June 20, 1989 (age 37) Tyler, Texas
- Height: 1.65 m (5 ft 5 in)
- Turned pro: 2007
- Plays: Right (two-handed backhand)
- Prize money: $219,195

Singles
- Career record: 254–237
- Career titles: 3 ITF
- Highest ranking: No. 181 (October 10, 2011)

Grand Slam singles results
- Australian Open: Q1 (2012)
- US Open: 1R (2007)

Doubles
- Career record: 207–199
- Career titles: 17 ITF
- Highest ranking: No. 109 (June 12, 2017)

Grand Slam doubles results
- Wimbledon: 1R (2017)
- US Open: 1R (2006, 2007, 2016)

Ashley Weinhold (born June 20, 1989) is a former tennis player from the United States. She turned professional in 2007 and had her last appearance on the ITF Circuit in August 2018.

Her career-high singles ranking is 181, achieved October 2011. On 12 June 2017, she peaked at No. 109 in the WTA doubles rankings.

Weinhold received six various entries into the US Open but always failed to reach round two. She enjoyed playing on clay, and has been playing tennis since age two. She could not win a title on tournaments of the WTA Tour. However, she won a total of 20 titles on the ITF Women's Circuit, three in singles and seventeen in doubles.

== Career ==
Weinhold received a wildcard into the 2006 US Open qualifying draw, and lost in the final round. She also was given a wildcard to enter the doubles event with Jamie Hampton, they lost to Anna Chakvetadze and Elena Vesnina, 2–6, 2–6 in the first round. She received a wildcard to compete in mixed doubles with Donald Young, they lost to Fabrice Santoro and Nathalie Dechy, 2–6, 3–6.

In 2007, Weinhold received another wildcard into the main draw of the US Open but lost to Chakvetadze, 1–6, 1–6. In doubles, she was also handed a wildcard, partnering Madison Brengle but lost in the first round to Stéphanie Foretz and Yaroslava Shvedova, 0–6, 3–6. Ashley and Ryan Sweeting lost in the first round of the mixed-doubles competition to Vladimíra Uhlířová and Simon Aspelin in a champions tiebreaker ([8–10]).

Partnering Caitlin Whoriskey, Weinhold entered the women's doubles draw at the 2016 US Open as wildcards, losing in the first round to 10th seeds Vania King and Monica Niculescu, in three sets.

== ITF Circuit finals ==
Legend
$100,000 tournaments
$50,000 tournaments
$25,000 tournaments
$10,000 tournaments

=== Singles: 8 (3–5) ===
Result	No.	Date	Location	Surface	Opponent	Score
Win	1.	9 July 2006	Southlake, United States	Hard	(Bosnia and Herzegovina) Helena Bešović	3–6, 6–3, 6–3
Loss	2.	12 October 2008	Southlake, United States	Hard	(United States) Jacqueline Cako	3–6, 6–4, 3–6
Loss	3.	13 December 2008	Benicarló, Spain	Clay	(Spain) María Teresa Torró Flor	4–6, 6–1, 5–7
Loss	4.	17 October 2010	Troy, United States	Hard	(Canada) Rebecca Marino	1–6, 2–6
Win	5.	13 February 2011	Rancho Mirage, US	Hard	(Czech Republic) Kristýna Plíšková	6–3, 3–6, 7–5
Loss	6.	10 June 2012	El Paso, US	Hard	(Canada) Marie-Ève Pelletier	5–7, 4–6
Win	7.	27 October 2013	Quintana Roo, Mexico	Hard	(Mexico) Renata Zarazúa	6–3, 4–6, 7–5
Loss	8.	8 June 2014	El Paso, US	Hard	(Belgium) Elise Mertens	1–6, 6–3, 4–6

=== Doubles: 24 (17–7) ===
Result	No.	Date	Location	Surface	Partner	Opponents	Score
Win	1.	4 June 2006	Houston, US	Hard (i)	(Canada) Jillian O'Neill	(Bulgaria) Elena Gantcheva (Czech Republic) Klara Jagosova	6–7^{(6)}, 7–5, 6–2
Win	2.	2 July 2006	Edmond, US	Hard	(United States) Alexa Glatch	(United States) Elizabeth Kaufman (United States) Lindsey Nelson	6–4, 6–4
Loss	1.	8 July 2006	Southlake, US	Hard	(Norway) Nina Munch-Søgaard	(Slovakia) Dominika Diešková (United States) Courtney Nagle	6–2, 6–7^{(4)}, 3–6
Loss	2.	14 June 2008	El Paso, US	Hard	(United States) Lindsay Lee-Waters	(South Africa) Surina De Beer (United States) Lauren Albanese	3–6, 3–6
Win	3.	16 November 2008	Mallorca, Spain	Clay	(Portugal) Catarina Ferreira	(Spain) Lucía Sainz (Spain) Cristina Sanchez-Quintanar	6–3, 5–7, [10–8]
Win	4.	30 November 2008	La Vall d'Uixó, Spain	Hard	(Spain) Lucía Sainz	(Switzerland) Conny Perrin (Switzerland) Stefania Boffa	6–2, 6–3
Win	5.	21 June 2009	Brownsville, US	Hard	(Australia) Sacha Jones	(United States) Ester Goldfeld (United States) Macall Harkins	6–3, 6–3
Win	6.	2 August 2009	St. Joseph, US	Hard	(United States) Irina Falconi	(United States) Chelsea Orr (United States) Caitlin Whoriskey	6–4, 7–6^{(6)}
Win	7.	30 May 2010	Sumter, US	Hard	(United States) Alexandra Mueller	(United States) Nicole Melichar (United States) Alexandra Leatu	6–1, 6–3
Loss	3.	12 June 2010	El Paso, US	Hard	(United States) Lindsay Lee-Waters	(United States) Angela Haynes (United States) Ahsha Rolle	3–6, 7–6^{(5)}, [7–10]
Win	8.	9 June 2012	El Paso, US	Hard	(United States) Sanaz Marand	(Oman) Fatma Al-Nabhani (Bolivia) María Fernanda Álvarez Terán	6–4, 6–3
Loss	4.	20 July 2013	Portland, US	Hard	(United States) Sanaz Marand	(United States) Irina Falconi (United States) Nicole Melichar	6–4, 3–6, [8–10]
Win	9.	19 October 2013	El Paso, US	Hard	(United States) Denise Muresan	(United States) Christiana Brigante (United States) Nikki Kallenberg	6–1, 7–5
Loss	5.	23 February 2014	Surprise, US	Hard	(United States) Sanaz Marand	(Japan) Shuko Aoyama (Japan) Eri Hozumi	3–6, 5–7
Win	10.	8 June 2014	El Paso, US	Hard	(United States) Jamie Loeb	(United States) Danielle Lao (Chinese Taipei) Hsu Chieh-yu	4–6, 6–4, [15–13]
Loss	6.	25 October 2014	Tennis Classic of Macon, US	Hard	(United States) Anna Tatishvili	(United States) Madison Brengle (United States) Alexa Glatch	0–6, 5–7
Win	11.	20 June 2015	Sumter, US	Hard	(United States) Alexandra Mueller	(United States) Jacqueline Cako (United States) Danielle Lao	5–7, 7–5, [10–6]
Win	12.	26 July 2015	Sacramento, US	Hard	(United States) Caitlin Whoriskey	(Japan) Nao Hibino (Canada) Rosie Johanson	6–4, 3–6, [14–12]
Win	13.	19 September 2015	Redding, US	Hard	(United States) Caitlin Whoriskey	(South Africa) Michelle Sammons (Thailand) Varatchaya Wongteanchai	6–2, 7–5
Win	14.	18 June 2016	Sumter, US	Hard	(United States) Caitlin Whoriskey	(United States) Jamie Loeb (Canada) Carol Zhao	7–6^{(5)}, 6–1
Win	15.	2 July 2016	El Paso, US	Hard	(United States) Caitlin Whoriskey	(United States) Sanaz Marand (Canada) Carol Zhao	6–4, 7–6^{(3)}
Win	16.	24 July 2016	Sacramento, US	Hard	(United States) Caitlin Whoriskey	(United States) Jamie Loeb (South Africa) Chanel Simmonds	6–4, 6–4
Loss	7.	5 November 2016	Toronto Challenger, Canada	Hard (i)	(United States) Caitlin Whoriskey	(Canada) Gabriela Dabrowski (Netherlands) Michaëlla Krajicek	4–6, 3–6
Win	17.	5 February 2017	Midland Classic, United States	Hard (i)	(United States) Caitlin Whoriskey	(United States) Kayla Day (United States) Caroline Dolehide	7–6^{(1)}, 6–3
