= 2019 Berkeley Tennis Club Challenge =

- Date: 15–21 July 2019
- Edition: 2nd
- Category: ITF Women's World Tennis Tour
- Prize money: $60,000
- Surface: Hard
- Location: Berkeley, California, United States

Champions

Singles
- (United States) Madison Brengle

Doubles
- (United States) Madison Brengle / (United States) Sachia Vickery
← 2018 ·	Berkeley Tennis Club Challenge	· 2021 →

The 2019 Berkeley Tennis Club Challenge was a professional tennis tournament played on outdoor hard courts. It was the second edition of the tournament which was part of the 2019 ITF Women's World Tennis Tour. It took place in Berkeley, California, United States between 15 and 21 July 2019.

== Singles main-draw entrants ==
=== Seeds ===
Country	Player	Rank^{1}	Seed
USA	Madison Brengle	85	1
USA	Sachia Vickery	136	2
~~RUS~~	~~Sofya Zhuk~~	~~157~~	~~3~~
USA	Francesca Di Lorenzo	159	4
KOR	Han Na-lae	175	5
USA	Kristie Ahn	190	6
AUS	Zoe Hives	195	7
GBR	Katie Swan	205	8

- ^{1} Rankings are as of 1 July 2019.

=== Other entrants ===
The following players received wildcards into the singles main draw:

- (United States) Kayla Day
- (United States) Maegan Manasse
- (United States) Natasha Subhash
- (United States) Katie Volynets

The following players received entry from the qualifying draw:

- (United States) Hanna Chang
- (United States) Victoria Duval
- (United States) Connie Ma
- (United Kingdom) Tara Moore
- (Australia) Abbie Myers
- (Japan) Junri Namigata
- (Mexico) Giuliana Olmos
- (United States) Alycia Parks

The following player received entry as a lucky loser:

- (China) You Xiaodi

== Champions ==
=== Singles ===
- (United States) Madison Brengle def. (Japan) Mayo Hibi, 7–5, 6–4

=== Doubles ===
- (United States) Madison Brengle / (United States) Sachia Vickery def. (United States) Francesca Di Lorenzo / (United Kingdom) Katie Swan, 6–3, 7–5
