= 2022 Berkeley Tennis Club Challenge =

Tennis tournament

- Date: 19–25 September 2022
- Edition: 4th
- Category: ITF Women's World Tennis Tour
- Prize money: $60,000
- Surface: Hard / Outdoor
- Location: Berkeley, California, United States

Champions

Singles
- (United States) Madison Brengle

Doubles
- (United States) Elvina Kalieva / (United States) Peyton Stearns
| ← 2021 · | Berkeley Tennis Club Challenge | · 2023 → |

The 2022 Berkeley Tennis Club Challenge was a professional tennis tournament played on outdoor hard courts. It was the fourth edition of the tournament which was part of the 2022 ITF Women's World Tennis Tour. It took place in Berkeley, California, United States between 19 and 25 September 2022.

== Champions ==
=== Singles ===
- (United States) Madison Brengle def. (China) Yuan Yue, 6–7^{(3–7)}, 6–3, 6–2

=== Doubles ===
- (United States) Elvina Kalieva / (United States) Peyton Stearns def. (United States) Allura Zamarripa / (United States) Maribella Zamarripa, 7–6^{(7–5)}, 7–6^{(7–5)}

== Singles main draw entrants ==
=== Seeds ===
| Country | Player | Rank^{1} | Seed |
|---|---|---|---|
| USA | Madison Brengle | 62 | 1 |
| CHN | Yuan Yue | 107 | 2 |
| USA | Katie Volynets | 112 | 3 |
| BEL | Greet Minnen | 141 | 4 |
| USA | Robin Anderson | 152 | 5 |
| USA | Sachia Vickery | 172 | 6 |
| USA | Katrina Scott | 179 | 7 |
| USA | Louisa Chirico | 191 | 8 |

- ^{1} Rankings are as of 12 September 2022.

=== Other entrants ===
The following players received wildcards into the singles main draw:

- (United States) Jenna DeFalco
- (United States) Rachel Gailis
- (United States) Maegan Manasse
- (Denmark) Johanne Svendsen

The following player received entry into the singles main draw using a protected ranking:

- (United States) Maria Mateas

The following players received entry from the qualifying draw:

- (Canada) Jessica Luisa Alsola
- (United States) Kylie Collins
- (United States) Makenna Jones
- (United States) Robin Montgomery
- (Denmark) Hannah Viller Møller
- (United States) Katja Wiersholm
- (Sweden) Lisa Zaar
- (United States) Maribella Zamarripa
