= 2018 Berkeley Tennis Club Challenge =

- Date: 16–22 July
- Edition: 1st
- Category: ITF Women's Circuit
- Prize money: $60,000
- Surface: Hard
- Location: Berkeley, United States

Champions

Singles
- (United States) Sofia Kenin

Doubles
- (United States) Nicole Gibbs / (United States) Asia Muhammad
Berkeley Tennis Club Challenge	· 2019 →

The 2018 Berkeley Tennis Club Challenge was a professional tennis tournament played on outdoor hard courts. It was the first edition of the tournament and was part of the 2018 ITF Women's Circuit. It took place in Berkeley, United States, on 16–22 July 2018.

== Singles main draw entrants ==
=== Seeds ===
Country	Player	Rank^{1}	Seed
USA	Sofia Kenin	76	1
USA	Nicole Gibbs	113	2
JPN	Nao Hibino	119	3
USA	Kristie Ahn	147	4
USA	Jamie Loeb	158	5
USA	Grace Min	172	6
USA	Francesca Di Lorenzo	192	7
JPN	Mayo Hibi	197	8

- ^{1} Rankings as of 2 July 2018.

=== Other entrants ===
The following players received a wildcard into the singles main draw:

- (United States) Gail Brodsky
- (United States) Ashley Lahey
- (United States) Maegan Manasse

The following players received entry from the qualifying draw:

- (Japan) Haruna Arakawa
- (United States) Lorraine Guillermo
- (United States) Connie Ma
- (United States) Pamela Montez

== Champions ==
=== Singles ===
- (United States) Sofia Kenin def. (United States) Nicole Gibbs, 6–0, 6–4

=== Doubles ===
- (United States) Nicole Gibbs / (United States) Asia Muhammad def. (Australia) Ellen Perez / (United States) Sabrina Santamaria, 6–4, 6–1
