= 2022 Berkeley Tennis Club Challenge – Singles =

Singles
- 2022 Berkeley Tennis Club Challenge

Final
- Champion: (United States) Madison Brengle
- Runner-up: (China) Yuan Yue
- Score: 6–7^{(3–7)}, 6–3, 6–2

Events
Singles	Doubles
← 2021 ·	Berkeley Tennis Club Challenge	· 2023 →

Usue Maitane Arconada was the defending champion but chose not to participate.

Madison Brengle won the title, defeating Yuan Yue in the final, 6–7^{(3–7)}, 6–3, 6–2.

== Seeds ==
1. (United States) Madison Brengle (champion)
2. (China) Yuan Yue (final)
3. (United States) Katie Volynets (second round)
4. (Belgium) Greet Minnen (first round)
5. (United States) Robin Anderson (second round)
6. (United States) Sachia Vickery (second round, retired)
7. (United States) Katrina Scott (first round)
8. (United States) Louisa Chirico (semifinals)

== Draw ==
=== Key ===
- Q = Qualifier
- WC = Wild card
- LL = Lucky loser
- Alt = Alternate
- SE = Special exempt
- PR = Protected ranking
- ITF = ITF entry
- JE = Junior exempt
- w/o = Walkover
- r = Retired
- d = Defaulted
- SR = Special ranking

=== Finals ===
Semifinals
1	(United States) Madison Brengle	6	6
Diana Shnaider	1	2
8	(United States) Louisa Chirico	7	5	1
2	(China) Yuan Yue	5	7	6

Final
1	(United States) Madison Brengle	6^{3}	6	6
2	(China) Yuan Yue	7^{7}	3	2

=== Top half ===
First round
1	(United States) M Brengle	6	6
Q	(United States) M Jones	2	3
(United States) W Osuigwe	1	6	6
(Mexico) M Zacarías	6	1	2
Q	(Canada) JL Alsola	2	3
WC	(Denmark) J Svendsen	6	6
Q	(United States) K Wiersholm	2	3
5	(United States) R Anderson	6	6
4	(Belgium) G Minnen	5	1
(United States) P Stearns	7	6
Q	(United States) M Zamarripa	0	6	3
(United States) K Day	6	1	6
Q	(Sweden) L Zaar	2	0
D Shnaider	6	6
Q	(United States) K Collins	4	4
6	(United States) S Vickery	6	6

Second round
1	(United States) M Brengle	7^{7}	6
(United States) W Osuigwe	6^{2}	4
WC	(Denmark) J Svendsen	6	7
5	(United States) R Anderson	3	5
(United States) P Stearns	6^{3}	6^{3}
(United States) K Day	7^{7}	7^{7}
D Shnaider	6	4
6	(United States) S Vickery	3	2^{r}

Quarterfinals
1	(United States) M Brengle	6	6
WC	(Denmark) J Svendsen	3	0
(United States) K Day	1	2
D Shnaider	6	6

Semifinals
1	(United States) M Brengle	6	6
D Shnaider	1	2

=== Bottom half ===
First round
8	(United States) L Chirico	7^{7}	6
WC	(United States) J DeFalco	6^{2}	3
WC	(United States) R Gailis	4	3
Q	(United States) R Montgomery	6	6
(United States) G Min	6^{6}	1
(United States) A Krueger	7^{8}	6
(France) A Robbe	4	5
3	(United States) K Volynets	6	7
7	(United States) K Scott	5	4
PR	(United States) M Mateas	7	6
WC	(United States) M Manasse	2	6	1
(Mexico) R Zarazúa	6	2	6
(Poland) U Radwańska	6	2	3
(United States) E Kalieva	3	6	6
Q	(Denmark) H Viller Møller	0	0
2	(China) Y Yuan	6	6

Second round
8	(United States) L Chirico	3	6	6
Q	(United States) R Montgomery	6	2	4
(United States) A Krueger	6	6
3	(United States) K Volynets	3	4
PR	(United States) M Mateas	3	1
(Mexico) R Zarazúa	6	6
(United States) E Kalieva	6^{4}	2
2	(China) Y Yuan	7^{7}	6

Quarterfinals
8	(United States) L Chirico	6	6
(United States) A Krueger	2	1
(Mexico) R Zarazúa	3	3
2	(China) Y Yuan	6	6

Semifinals
8	(United States) L Chirico	7	5	1
2	(China) Y Yuan	5	7	6
