= 2021 Berkeley Tennis Club Challenge =

Tennis tournament

- Date: 27 September–3 October 2021
- Edition: 3rd
- Category: ITF Women's World Tennis Tour
- Prize money: $60,000
- Surface: Hard
- Location: Berkeley, California, United States

Champions

Singles
- (United States) Usue Maitane Arconada

Doubles
- (United States) Sophie Chang / (United States) Angela Kulikov
← 2019 ·	Berkeley Tennis Club Challenge	· 2022 →

The 2021 Berkeley Tennis Club Challenge was a professional women's tennis tournament played on outdoor hard courts. It was the third edition of the tournament which was part of the 2021 ITF Women's World Tennis Tour. It took place in Berkeley, California, United States between 27 September and 3 October 2021.

== Singles main-draw entrants ==
=== Seeds ===
Country	Player	Rank^{1}	Seed
CHN	Zheng Saisai	83	1
CHN	Wang Xinyu	129	2
HUN	Panna Udvardy	143	3
JPN	Kurumi Nara	176	4
USA	Katie Volynets	185	5
USA	Francesca Di Lorenzo	193	6
JPN	Mayo Hibi	209	7
TPE	Liang En-shuo	228	8

- ^{1} Rankings are as of 20 September 2021.

=== Other entrants ===
The following players received wildcards into the singles main draw:

- (United States) Reese Brantmeier
- (United States) Ellie Douglas
- (United States) Victoria Duval
- (Spain) Paola Expósito Díaz Delgado

The following player received entry using a protected ranking:

- (United States) Louisa Chirico

The following player received entry as a special exempt:

- (United States) Kayla Day

The following players received entry from the qualifying draw:

- (Australia) Alexandra Bozovic
- (United States) Sophie Chang
- (United States) Jada Hart
- (Japan) Haruka Kaji
- (Russia) Maria Kozyreva
- (Japan) Hiroko Kuwata
- (United States) Maegan Manasse
- (United States) Emma Navarro

== Champions ==
=== Singles ===
- (United States) Usue Maitane Arconada def. (Mexico) Marcela Zacarías, 6–1, 6–3

=== Doubles ===
- (United States) Sophie Chang / (United States) Angela Kulikovdef. (Chinese Taipei) Liang En-shuo / (China) Lu Jiajing, 6–4, 6–3
