= 2021 Berkeley Tennis Club Challenge – Singles =

Singles
- 2021 Berkeley Tennis Club Challenge

Final
- Champion: (United States) Usue Maitane Arconada
- Runner-up: (Mexico) Marcela Zacarías
- Score: 6–1, 6–3

Events
Singles	Doubles
← 2019 ·	Berkeley Tennis Club Challenge	· 2022 →

Madison Brengle was the defending champion but chose to compete at the 2021 Chicago Fall Tennis Classic instead.

Usue Maitane Arconada won the title, defeating Marcela Zacarías in the final, 6–1, 6–3.

== Seeds ==
1. (China) Zheng Saisai (first round)
2. (China) Wang Xinyu (first round)
3. (Hungary) Panna Udvardy (first round)
4. (Japan) Kurumi Nara (semifinals, retired)
5. (United States) Katie Volynets (first round)
6. (United States) Francesca Di Lorenzo (first round)
7. (Japan) Mayo Hibi (semifinals)
8. (Chinese Taipei) Liang En-shuo (quarterfinals)

== Draw ==
=== Key ===
- Q = Qualifier
- WC = Wild card
- LL = Lucky loser
- Alt = Alternate
- SE = Special exempt
- PR = Protected ranking
- ITF = ITF entry
- JE = Junior exempt
- w/o = Walkover
- r = Retired
- d = Defaulted
- SR = Special ranking

=== Finals ===
Semifinals
(Mexico) Marcela Zacarías	5	3
4	(Japan) Kurumi Nara	7	0^{r}
7	(Japan) Mayo Hibi	3	7^{7}	4
(United States) Usue Maitane Arconada	6	6^{3}	6

Final
(Mexico) Marcela Zacarías	1	3
(United States) Usue Maitane Arconada	6	6

=== Top half ===
First round
1	(China) S Zheng	6	5	1
Q	(Russia) M Kozyreva	4	7	6
(Japan) K Okamura	5	2
Q	(United States) E Navarro	7	6
WC	(United States) R Brantmeier	6	2	6
Q	(Australia) A Bozovic	3	6	4
(Mexico) M Zacarías	7^{7}	3	6
5	(United States) K Volynets	6^{5}	6	2
4	(Japan) K Nara	7^{7}	7
Q	(Japan) H Kuwata	6^{1}	5
Q	(United States) M Manasse	6^{3}	2
WC	(United States) E Douglas	7^{7}	6
(United States) D Lao	2	0^{r}
Q	(United States) S Chang	6	1
(Slovenia) D Jakupović	6	6
6	(United States) F Di Lorenzo	3	2

Second round
Q	(Russia) M Kozyreva	5	3
Q	(United States) E Navarro	7	6
WC	(United States) R Brantmeier	7	2	1
(Mexico) M Zacarías	5	6	6
4	(Japan) K Nara	6	6
WC	(United States) E Douglas	3	2
Q	(United States) S Chang	6	6
(Slovenia) D Jakupović	1	2

Quarterfinals
Q	(United States) E Navarro	5	7	2
(Mexico) M Zacarías	7	5	6
4	(Japan) K Nara	7^{7}	5	6
Q	(United States) S Chang	6^{5}	7	4

Semifinals
(Mexico) M Zacarías	5	3
4	(Japan) K Nara	7	0^{r}

=== Bottom half ===
First round
7	(Japan) M Hibi	6	6
Q	(United States) J Hart	3	2
WC	(United States) V Duval	6	6
Q	(Japan) H Kaji	2	1
WC	(Spain) P Expósito Díaz Delgado	2	6	1
SE	(United States) K Day	6	3	6
PR	(United States) L Chirico	6	4	6
3	(Hungary) P Udvardy	4	6	4
8	(Chinese Taipei) E-s Liang	6	7
(China) Jia Lu	4	5
(United States) H Chang	6	4	6
(Sweden) M Björklund	3	6	1
(Canada) K Sebov	6^{7}	4
(United States) UM Arconada	7^{9}	6
(United States) S Vickery	7	7^{7}
2	(China) Xin Wang	5	6^{5}

Second round
7	(Japan) M Hibi	6	7^{7}
WC	(United States) V Duval	0	6^{3}
SE	(United States) K Day	0^{r}
PR	(United States) L Chirico	2
8	(Chinese Taipei) E-s Liang	6	6
(United States) H Chang	2	1
(United States) UM Arconada	6	6^{5}	6
(United States) S Vickery	4	7^{7}	2

Quarterfinals
7	(Japan) M Hibi	6	6
PR	(United States) L Chirico	2	3
8	(Chinese Taipei) E-s Liang	3	1
(United States) UM Arconada	6	6

Semifinals
7	(Japan) M Hibi	3	7^{7}	4
(United States) UM Arconada	6	6^{3}	6
