= 2021 Berkeley Tennis Club Challenge – Doubles =

Doubles
- 2021 Berkeley Tennis Club Challenge

Final
- Champions: (United States) Sophie Chang (United States) Angela Kulikov
- Runners-up: (Chinese Taipei) Liang En-shuo (China) Lu Jiajing
- Score: 6–4, 6–3

Events
Singles	Doubles
← 2019 ·	Berkeley Tennis Club Challenge	· 2022 →

Madison Brengle and Sachia Vickery were the defending champions but chose not to participate.

Sophie Chang and Angela Kulikov won the title, defeating Liang En-shuo and Lu Jiajing in the final, 6–4, 6–3.

== Seeds ==
1. (Slovenia) Dalila Jakupović / (Japan) Hiroko Kuwata (semifinals)
2. (Chile) Bárbara Gatica / (Brazil) Rebeca Pereira (first round)
3. (Australia) Ivana Popovic / (Australia) Olivia Tjandramulia (semifinals)
4. (Chinese Taipei) Liang En-shuo / (China) Lu Jiajing (final)

== Draw ==
=== Key ===
- Q = Qualifier
- WC = Wild card
- LL = Lucky loser
- Alt = Alternate
- SE = Special exempt
- PR = Protected ranking
- ITF = ITF entry
- JE = Junior exempt
- w/o = Walkover
- r = Retired
- d = Defaulted
- SR = Special ranking

=== Draw ===
First round
1	(Slovenia) D Jakupović (Japan) H Kuwata	6	6
(Sweden) M Björklund (United States) F Di Lorenzo	2	3
WC	(United States) H Giavara (New Zealand) V Ivanov	2	5
WC	(United States) E Bolton (United States) J Hart	6	7
4	(Chinese Taipei) E-s Liang (China) Jia Lu	6	6^{5}	[11]
(United States) J Aney (United States) M Manasse	2	7^{7}	[9]
(United States) UM Arconada (United States) L Chirico	w/o
WC	(United States) C Chavatipon (United States) C Van Nguyen
(Japan) K Okamura (United States) K Volynets	w/o
(Canada) K Sebov (Japan) R Ushijima
(United States) R Brantmeier (United States) H Chang	6^{4}	6	[7]
3	(Australia) I Popovic (Australia) O Tjandramulia	7^{7}	3	[10]
(Australia) A Bozovic (Australia) A Osborne	1	3
(United States) S Chang (United States) A Kulikov	6	6
(United States) V Duval (Mexico) M Zacarías	6	6
2	(Chile) B Gatica (Brazil) R Pereira	3	4

Quarterfinals
1	(Slovenia) D Jakupović (Japan) H Kuwata	6	1	[10]
WC	(United States) E Bolton (United States) J Hart	4	6	[6]
4	(Chinese Taipei) E-s Liang (China) Jia Lu	w/o
(United States) UM Arconada (United States) L Chirico
(Japan) K Okamura (United States) K Volynets	3	3
3	(Australia) I Popovic (Australia) O Tjandramulia	6	6
(United States) S Chang (United States) A Kulikov	7	6
(United States) V Duval (Mexico) M Zacarías	5	1

Semifinals
1	(Slovenia) D Jakupović (Japan) H Kuwata	4	4
4	(Chinese Taipei) E-s Liang (China) Jia Lu	6	6
3	(Australia) I Popovic (Australia) O Tjandramulia	4	3
(United States) S Chang (United States) A Kulikov	6	6

Final
4	(Chinese Taipei) E-s Liang (China) Jia Lu	4	3
(United States) S Chang (United States) A Kulikov	6	6
