= 2023 Berkeley Tennis Club Challenge =

Tennis tournament

- Date: 18–24 September 2023
- Edition: 5th
- Category: ITF Women's World Tennis Tour
- Prize money: $60,000
- Surface: Hard / Outdoor
- Location: Berkeley, California, United States

Champions

Singles
- (Canada) Marina Stakusic

Doubles
- (United States) Jessie Aney / (Colombia) María Herazo González
← 2022 ·	Berkeley Tennis Club Challenge	· 2024 →

The 2023 Berkeley Tennis Club Challenge was a professional tennis tournament played on outdoor hard courts. It was the fifth edition of the tournament which was part of the 2023 ITF Women's World Tennis Tour. It took place in Berkeley, California, United States between 18 and 24 September 2023.

== Champions ==
=== Singles ===
- (Canada) Marina Stakusic def. (United States) Allie Kiick, 6–3, 6–4

=== Doubles ===
- (United States) Jessie Aney / (Colombia) María Herazo González def. (Australia) Elysia Bolton / (Australia) Alexandra Bozovic, 7–5, 7–5

== Singles main draw entrants ==
=== Seeds ===
Country	Player	Rank^{1}	Seed
USA	Madison Brengle	101	1
USA	Katie Volynets	117	2
CAN	Katherine Sebov	149	3
FRA	Elsa Jacquemot	172	4
SUI	Lulu Sun	200	5
	Tatiana Prozorova	205	6
MEX	Marcela Zacarías	234	7
USA	Makenna Jones	255	8

- ^{1} Rankings are as of 11 September 2023.

=== Other entrants ===
The following players received wildcards into the singles main draw:

- (United States) Jenna DeFalco
- (United States) Haley Giavara
- (United States) Clervie Ngounoue
- (United States) Alexa Noel

The following players received entry from the qualifying draw:

- (Canada) Jessica Luisa Alsola
- (United States) Ellie Douglas
- (United States) Allie Kiick
- Maria Kozyreva
- (United States) Lea Ma
- (United States) Kylie McKenzie
- (France) Marine Partaud
- (Ukraine) Hanna Poznikhirenko

The following player received entry into the singles main draw using a special ranking:

- (Canada) Marina Stakusic
