= 2019 Berkeley Tennis Club Challenge – Singles =

Singles
- 2019 Berkeley Tennis Club Challenge

Final
- Champion: (United States) Madison Brengle
- Runner-up: (Japan) Mayo Hibi
- Score: 7–5, 6–4

Events
Singles	Doubles
← 2018 ·	Berkeley Tennis Club Challenge	· 2021 →

Sofia Kenin was the defending champion, but chose not to participate.

Madison Brengle won the title, defeating Mayo Hibi in the final, 7–5, 6–4.

== Seeds ==
1. (United States) Madison Brengle (champion)
2. (United States) Sachia Vickery (semifinals)
3. (Russia) Sofya Zhuk (withdrew)
4. (United States) Francesca Di Lorenzo (first round)
5. (South Korea) Han Na-lae (quarterfinals)
6. (United States) Kristie Ahn (semifinals)
7. (Australia) Zoe Hives (first round)
8. (United Kingdom) Katie Swan (first round)

== Draw ==
=== Key ===
- Q = Qualifier
- WC = Wild card
- LL = Lucky loser
- Alt = Alternate
- SE = Special exempt
- PR = Protected ranking
- ITF = ITF entry
- JE = Junior exempt
- w/o = Walkover
- r = Retired
- d = Defaulted
- SR = Special ranking

=== Finals ===
Semifinals
1	(United States) Madison Brengle	6	6
6	(United States) Kristie Ahn	1	3
(Japan) Mayo Hibi	6	6
2	(United States) Sachia Vickery	3	0

Final
1	(United States) Madison Brengle	7	6
(Japan) Mayo Hibi	5	4

=== Top half ===
First round
1	(United States) M Brengle	6	6
Q	(United States) C Ma	3	1
Q	(Mexico) G Olmos	2	3
Q	(United States) A Parks	6	6
(United States) G Brodsky	6	6
Q	(Australia) A Myers	3	3
(Japan) H Kuwata	6	6
7	(Australia) Z Hives	3	4
4	(United States) F Di Lorenzo	4	5
(Australia) Ar Rodionova	6	7
(Serbia) J Jakšić	6	6
WC	(United States) N Subhash	2	4
(Israel) D Khazaniuk	3	4
(United States) UM Arconada	6	6
Q	(United Kingdom) T Moore	3	3
6	(United States) K Ahn	6	6

Second round
1	(United States) M Brengle	3	7	6
Q	(United States) A Parks	6	5	3
(United States) G Brodsky	6	5	7
(Japan) H Kuwata	4	7	5
(Australia) Ar Rodionova	6^{5}	7^{8}	6
(Serbia) J Jakšić	7^{7}	6^{6}	3
(United States) UM Arconada	5	2
6	(United States) K Ahn	7	6

Quarterfinals
1	(United States) M Brengle	6	6
(United States) G Brodsky	0	4
(Australia) Ar Rodionova	4	6	3
6	(United States) K Ahn	6	3	6

Semifinals
1	(United States) M Brengle	6	6
6	(United States) K Ahn	1	3

=== Bottom half ===
First round
5	(South Korea) N-l Han	6	6
Q	(Japan) J Namigata	4	1
(Australia) L Cabrera	0	1
(Japan) A Shimizu	6	6
(China) Y Zhang	3	3
(Japan) M Hibi	6	6
LL	(China) X You	6	6
Q	(United States) V Duval	1	2
8	(United Kingdom) K Swan	5	3
(United States) H Baptiste	7	6
WC	(United States) K Volynets	7	2	6^{3}
(United States) C Dolehide	5	6	7^{7}
WC	(United States) K Day	6	4	4
Q	(United States) H Chang	2	6	6
WC	(United States) M Manasse	4	4
2	(United States) S Vickery	6	6

Second round
5	(South Korea) N-l Han	6^{4}	6	6
(Japan) A Shimizu	7^{7}	1	3
(Japan) M Hibi	4	7	6
LL	(China) X You	6	5	1
(United States) H Baptiste	4	4
(United States) C Dolehide	6	6
(United States) H Chang	4	4
2	(United States) S Vickery	6	6

Quarterfinals
5	(South Korea) N-l Han	5	4
(Japan) M Hibi	7	6
(United States) C Dolehide	3	5
2	(United States) S Vickery	6	7

Semifinals
(Japan) M Hibi	6	6
2	(United States) S Vickery	3	0
