= 2023 Vero Beach International Tennis Open =

- Date: 16–22 January
- Edition: 4th
- Category: ITF Women's World Tennis Tour
- Prize money: $60,000
- Surface: Clay
- Location: Vero Beach, United States

Champions

Singles
- (Belgium) Marie Benoît

Doubles
- (United States) Francesca Di Lorenzo / (United States) Makenna Jones
← 2022 ·	Vero Beach International Tennis Open	· 2024 →

The 2023 Vero Beach International Tennis Open was a professional tennis tournament played on outdoor clay courts. It was the fourth edition of the tournament and was part of the 2023 ITF Women's World Tennis Tour. It took place in Vero Beach, United States between 16 and 22 January 2023.

== Singles main draw entrants ==
=== Seeds ===
Country	Player	Rank^{1}	Seed
HUN	Réka Luca Jani	113	1
USA	Emma Navarro	149	2
USA	Hailey Baptiste	157	3
USA	Louisa Chirico	163	4
MEX	Fernanda Contreras Gómez	167	5
USA	Kayla Day	197	6
USA	Peyton Stearns	209	7
USA	Elvina Kalieva	236	8

- ^{1} Rankings as of 9 January 2023.

=== Other entrants ===
The following players received a wildcard into the singles main draw:

- (United States) Hailey Baptiste
- (United States) Makenna Jones
- (United States) McCartney Kessler

The following players received entry into the singles main draw using protected rankings:

- (Colombia) Emiliana Arango
- (United States) Maria Mateas

The following players received entry from the qualifying draw:

- (United States) Quinn Gleason
- (Chinese Taipei) Hsu Chieh-yu
- (Bulgaria) Lia Karatancheva
- (United States) Victoria Osuigwe
- (United States) Kariann Pierre-Louis
- (United States) Kaitlin Quevedo
- (United States) Anna Rogers
- (United States) Alana Smith

== Champions ==
=== Singles ===
- (Belgium) Marie Benoît def. (United States) Emma Navarro 6–2, 7–5

=== Doubles ===
- (United States) Francesca Di Lorenzo / (United States) Makenna Jones def. (United States) Quinn Gleason / (France) Elixane Lechemia 6–3, 3–6, [10–6]
