= 2023 Berkeley Tennis Club Challenge – Doubles =

Doubles
- 2023 Berkeley Tennis Club Challenge

Final
- Champions: (United States) Jessie Aney (Colombia) María Herazo González
- Runners-up: (Australia) Elysia Bolton (Australia) Alexandra Bozovic
- Score: 7–5, 7–5

Events
Singles	Doubles
← 2022 ·	Berkeley Tennis Club Challenge	· 2024 →

Elvina Kalieva and Peyton Stearns were the defending champions but both chose participate at the Guadalajara Open Akron.

Jessie Aney and María Herazo González won the title, defeating Elysia Bolton and Alexandra Bozovic in the final, 7–5, 7–5.

== Seeds ==
1. (United States) Makenna Jones / (United States) Jamie Loeb (quarterfinals)
2. (United States) Jessie Aney / (Colombia) María Herazo González (champions)
3. (Australia) Elysia Bolton / (Australia) Alexandra Bozovic (final)
4. (United States) Carmen Corley / (United States) Ivana Corley (semifinals)

== Draw ==
=== Key ===
- Q = Qualifier
- WC = Wild card
- LL = Lucky loser
- Alt = Alternate
- SE = Special exempt
- PR = Protected ranking
- ITF = ITF entry
- JE = Junior exempt
- w/o = Walkover
- r = Retired
- d = Defaulted
- SR = Special ranking

=== Draw ===
First round
1	(United States) M Jones (United States) J Loeb	6	7
(France) E Jacquemot (United States) K Volynets	4	5
(United States) R McAdoo (France) M Partaud	4	6	[11]
WC	(Canada) JL Alsola (Japan) Ma Mushika	6	4	[9]
3	(Australia) E Bolton (Australia) A Bozovic	6	6
(Australia) G Da Silva-Fick; M Kozyreva	4	4
(United States) A Zamarripa (United States) M Zamarripa	6	6
(United States) S Chang (Canada) K Sebov	0	4
(Canada) V Mboko (United States) W Osuigwe	6^{5}	3
(United States) L Hovde (United States) C Ngounoue	7^{7}	6
(United States) M Kessler (United States) A Smith	7	5	[4]
4	(United States) C Corley (United States) I Corley	5	7	[10]
WC	(United States) H Giavara (United States) V Hu	3	5
(United States) M Brengle (Mexico) M Zacarías	6	7
WC	(Denmark) J Svendsen (Denmark) H Viller Møller	6	2	[4]
2	(United States) J Aney (Colombia) M Herazo González	4	6	[10]

Quarterfinals
1	(United States) M Jones (United States) J Loeb	6	3	[12]
(United States) R McAdoo (France) M Partaud	2	6	[14]
3	(Australia) E Bolton (Australia) A Bozovic	5	6	[10]
(United States) A Zamarripa (United States) M Zamarripa	7	2	[8]
(United States) L Hovde (United States) C Ngounoue	4	6	[6]
4	(United States) C Corley (United States) I Corley	6	3	[10]
(United States) M Brengle (Mexico) M Zacarías	0	7	[10]
2	(United States) J Aney (Colombia) M Herazo González	6	5	[12]

Semifinals
(United States) R McAdoo (France) M Partaud	4	4
3	(Australia) E Bolton (Australia) A Bozovic	6	6
4	(United States) C Corley (United States) I Corley	7^{7}	4	[9]
2	(United States) J Aney (Colombia) M Herazo González	6^{4}	6	[11]

Final
3	(Australia) E Bolton (Australia) A Bozovic	5	5
2	(United States) J Aney (Colombia) M Herazo González	7	7
