= 2024 Vero Beach International Tennis Open – Doubles =

Doubles
- 2024 Vero Beach International Tennis Open

Final
- Champion: (United States) Allura Zamarripa (United States) Maribella Zamarripa
- Runner-up: (United States) Hailey Baptiste (United States) Whitney Osuigwe
- Score: 6–3, 3–6, [10–4]

Events
| Singles | Doubles |
| ← 2023 · | Vero Beach International Tennis Open | · 2025 → |

Francesca Di Lorenzo and Makenna Jones were the defending champions, but Di Lorenzo retired from professional tennis last summer, and Jones chose not to participate.

Allura Zamarripa and Maribella Zamarripa won the title, defeating Hailey Baptiste and Whitney Osuigwe in the final, 6–3, 3–6, [10–4].

== Seeds ==
1. (United States) Sophie Chang / (Ukraine) Yulia Starodubtseva (semifinal)
2. (United States) Hailey Baptiste / (United States) Whitney Osuigwe (final)
3. (Argentina) María Lourdes Carlé / (United States) Sofia Sewing (semifinal)
4. Veronika Miroshnichenko / (Ukraine) Valeriya Strakhova (withdrew)

== Draw ==
Key

- Q = Qualifier
- WC = Wild card
- LL = Lucky loser
- Alt = Alternate
- ITF = ITF entry
- PR = Protected ranking
- SR = Special ranking
- SE = Special exempt
- JE = Junior exempt
- JR = Junior Accelerator Programme entrant
- CO = College Accelerator Programme entrant
- NG = Next Gen Accelerator Program entrant
- w/o = Walkover
- r = Retired
- d = Defaulted

=== Draw ===
First round
1 | (United States) S Chang (Ukraine) Y Starodubtseva | 6 | 6
(Georgia (country)) E Gorgodze (United States) S Vickery | 2 | 0
(United States) R Montgomery (United States) C Ngounoue | 5 | 6 | [10]
(United States) C Corley (United States) I Corley | 7 | 3 | [5]
Alt | (Japan) M Aikawa (United States) A Reami | 1 | 2
WC | (United States) A Zamarripa (United States) M Zamarripa | 6 | 6
M Kononova (United States) R McAdoo | 6 | 7^{8}
(United States) H Chang (United States) A Kulikov | 3 | 6^{6}
(Canada) K Cross (Canada) L Sleeth | 6 | 6
WC | (Mexico) F Castillo Huerta (France) M Partaud | 1 | 0
Alt | (Switzerland) L Küng (Romania) G Lee | 5 | 0
3 | (Argentina) ML Carlé (United States) S Sewing | 7 | 6
(Romania) AG Vasilescu (United Kingdom) E Webley-Smith | 6 | 6
WC | (Spain) C Quevedo (Spain) M Soler Valverde | 4 | 3
(Netherlands) I Haverlag (United States) A Rogers | 6^{2} | 4
2 | (United States) H Baptiste (United States) W Osuigwe | 7^{7} | 6

Quarterfinals
1 | (United States) S Chang (Ukraine) Y Starodubtseva | 6 | 4 | [10]
(United States) R Montgomery (United States) C Ngounoue | 4 | 6 | [2]
WC | (United States) A Zamarripa (United States) M Zamarripa | 2 | 6 | [10]
M Kononova (United States) R McAdoo | 6 | 3 | [4]
(Canada) K Cross (Canada) L Sleeth | 3 | 6 | [11]
3 | (Argentina) ML Carlé (United States) S Sewing | 6 | 3 | [13]
(Romania) AG Vasilescu (United Kingdom) E Webley-Smith | 2 | 4
2 | (United States) H Baptiste (United States) W Osuigwe | 6 | 6

Semifinals
1 | (United States) S Chang (Ukraine) Y Starodubtseva | 3 | 3
WC | (United States) A Zamarripa (United States) M Zamarripa | 6 | 6
3 | (Argentina) ML Carlé (United States) S Sewing | 1 | 6 | [4]
2 | (United States) H Baptiste (United States) W Osuigwe | 6 | 4 | [10]

Final
WC | (United States) A Zamarripa (United States) M Zamarripa | 6 | 3 | [10]
2 | (United States) H Baptiste (United States) W Osuigwe | 3 | 6 | [4]
