= 2018 Berkeley Tennis Club Challenge – Singles =

Singles
- 2018 Berkeley Tennis Club Challenge

Final
- Champion: (United States) Sofia Kenin
- Runner-up: (United States) Nicole Gibbs
- Score: 6–0, 6–4

Events
Singles	Doubles
Berkeley Tennis Club Challenge	· 2019 →

This was the first edition of the tournament.

Sofia Kenin won the title after defeating Nicole Gibbs 6–0, 6–4 in the final.

== Seeds ==
1. (United States) Sofia Kenin (champion)
2. (United States) Nicole Gibbs (final)
3. (Japan) Nao Hibino (semifinals)
4. (United States) Kristie Ahn (quarterfinals)
5. (United States) Jamie Loeb (quarterfinals)
6. (United States) Grace Min (first round)
7. (United States) Francesca Di Lorenzo (quarterfinals)
8. (Japan) Mayo Hibi (quarterfinals)

== Draw ==
=== Key ===
- Q = Qualifier
- WC = Wild card
- LL = Lucky loser
- Alt = Alternate
- SE = Special exempt
- PR = Protected ranking
- ITF = ITF entry
- JE = Junior exempt
- w/o = Walkover
- r = Retired
- d = Defaulted
- SR = Special ranking

=== Finals ===
Semifinals
1	(United States) Sofia Kenin	7^{8}	6
3	(Japan) Nao Hibino	6^{6}	2
(United States) Ashley Kratzer	4	2
2	(United States) Nicole Gibbs	6	6

Final
1	(United States) Sofia Kenin	6	6
2	(United States) Nicole Gibbs	0	4

=== Top half ===
First round
1	(United States) S Kenin	6	6
Q	(Japan) H Arakawa	0	3
WC	(United States) A Lahey	7	5	1
(United States) E Bektas	5	7	6
(France) M Arcangioli	6	7^{7}
(Australia) E Perez	1	6^{4}
Q	(United States) C Ma	0	3
8	(Japan) M Hibi	6	6
3	(Japan) N Hibino	6	6
(Japan) M Doi	4	4
(United States) Q Gleason	5	3
WC	(United States) G Brodsky	7	6
(Australia) A Bai	1	6	7
(Papua New Guinea) A Tere-Apisah	6	3	5
(United States) UM Arconada	3	5
7	(United States) F Di Lorenzo	6	7

Second round
1	(United States) S Kenin	6	7^{7}
(United States) E Bektas	3	6^{3}
(France) M Arcangioli	6^{3}	1
8	(Japan) M Hibi	7^{7}	6
3	(Japan) N Hibino	6	6
WC	(United States) G Brodsky	4	4
(Australia) A Bai	4	3
7	(United States) F Di Lorenzo	6	6

Quarterfinals
1	(United States) S Kenin	6	6
8	(Japan) M Hibi	1	4
3	(Japan) N Hibino	7^{7}	6
7	(United States) F Di Lorenzo	6^{3}	1

Semifinals
1	(United States) S Kenin	7^{8}	6
3	(Japan) N Hibino	6^{6}	2

=== Bottom half ===
First round
6	(United States) G Min	4	4
(United States) A Kratzer	6	6
(United Kingdom) T Moore	4	2
(United States) D Lao	6	6
Q	(United States) L Guillermo	4	2
WC	(United States) M Manasse	6	6
(Colombia) E Arango	4	1
4	(United States) K Ahn	6	6
5	(United States) J Loeb	7	3	6
(United States) A Muhammad	5	6	2
(South Africa) C Simmonds	6	6
Q	(United States) P Montez	1	3
(Australia) K Birrell	2	2
(United States) M Sanchez	6	6
(Serbia) J Jakšić	2	4
2	(United States) N Gibbs	6	6

Second round
(United States) A Kratzer	5	6	7^{9}
(United States) D Lao	7	4	6^{7}
WC	(United States) M Manasse	1	6	1
4	(United States) K Ahn	6	4	6
5	(United States) J Loeb	6	6
(South Africa) C Simmonds	4	1
(United States) M Sanchez	1	1
2	(United States) N Gibbs	6	6

Quarterfinals
(United States) A Kratzer	6	2	6
4	(United States) K Ahn	4	6	1
5	(United States) J Loeb	3	2
2	(United States) N Gibbs	6	6

Semifinals
(United States) A Kratzer	4	2
2	(United States) N Gibbs	6	6
