= 2022 Berkeley Tennis Club Challenge – Doubles =

Doubles
- 2022 Berkeley Tennis Club Challenge

Final
- Champions: (United States) Elvina Kalieva (United States) Peyton Stearns
- Runners-up: (United States) Allura Zamarripa (United States) Maribella Zamarripa
- Score: 7–6^{(7–5)}, 7–6^{(7–5)}

Events
Singles	Doubles
← 2021 ·	Berkeley Tennis Club Challenge	· 2023 →

Sophie Chang and Angela Kulikov were the defending champions but chose not to participate.

Elvina Kalieva and Peyton Stearns won the title, defeating Allura and Maribella Zamarripa in the final, 7–6^{(7–5)}, 7–6^{(7–5)}.

== Seeds ==
1. (Australia) Alexandra Osborne / (Mexico) Marcela Zacarías (quarterfinals)
2. (Japan) Hiroko Kuwata / (Ukraine) Kateryna Volodko (first round)
3. (United States) Whitney Osuigwe / (Mexico) Renata Zarazúa (quarterfinals)
4. (United States) Robin Anderson / (United States) Sachia Vickery (first round)

== Draw ==
=== Key ===
- Q = Qualifier
- WC = Wild card
- LL = Lucky loser
- Alt = Alternate
- SE = Special exempt
- PR = Protected ranking
- ITF = ITF entry
- JE = Junior exempt
- w/o = Walkover
- r = Retired
- d = Defaulted
- SR = Special ranking

=== Draw ===
First round
1	(Australia) A Osborne (Mexico) M Zacarías	6	6
WC	(United States) K Bunch (United States) R Newborn	3	3
(United States) L Chirico (United States) G Min	4	1
(United States) A Krueger (United States) R Montgomery	6	6
4	(United States) R Anderson (United States) S Vickery	6	3	[5]
(United States) A Zamarripa (United States) M Zamarripa	2	6	[10]
(United States) M Brengle (United States) S Crawford	5	6	[10]
WC	(United States) A Glatch (United States) M Jones	7	3	[4]
(United States) M Mateas (Brazil) R Pereira	5	3
WC	(Canada) JL Alsola (New Zealand) V Ivanov	7	6
(Israel) S Kimchi (France) A Robbe	1	2
3	(United States) W Osuigwe (Mexico) R Zarazúa	6	6
(United States) E Kalieva (United States) P Stearns	6	6
(Australia) E Bolton (United States) K Collins	1	2
(United States) J Hart (United States) R McAdoo	4	6	[10]
2	(Japan) H Kuwata (Ukraine) K Volodko	6	3	[8]

Quarterfinals
1	(Australia) A Osborne (Mexico) M Zacarías	6^{6}	4
(United States) A Krueger (United States) R Montgomery	7^{8}	6
(United States) A Zamarripa (United States) M Zamarripa	3	6	[10]
(United States) M Brengle (United States) S Crawford	6	0	[4]
WC	(Canada) JL Alsola (New Zealand) V Ivanov	6	7
3	(United States) W Osuigwe (Mexico) R Zarazúa	3	5
(United States) E Kalieva (United States) P Stearns	6	6
(United States) J Hart (United States) R McAdoo	1	4

Semifinals
(United States) A Krueger (United States) R Montgomery	3	3
(United States) A Zamarripa (United States) M Zamarripa	6	6
WC	(Canada) JL Alsola (New Zealand) V Ivanov	3	4
(United States) E Kalieva (United States) P Stearns	6	6

Final
(United States) A Zamarripa (United States) M Zamarripa	6^{5}	6^{5}
(United States) E Kalieva (United States) P Stearns	7^{7}	7^{7}
