= 2024 Vero Beach International Tennis Open =

- Date: 22–28 January
- Edition: 5th
- Category: ITF Women's World Tennis Tour
- Prize money: $60,000
- Surface: Clay
- Location: Vero Beach, United States

Champions

Singles
- (Argentina) María Lourdes Carlé

Doubles
- (United States) Allura Zamarripa / (United States) Maribella Zamarripa
← 2023 ·	Vero Beach International Tennis Open	· 2025 →

The 2024 Vero Beach International Tennis Open is a professional tennis tournament played on outdoor clay courts. It was the fifth edition of the tournament and part of the 2024 ITF Women's World Tennis Tour. It took place in Vero Beach, Florida, United States between 22 and 28 January 2024.

== Champions ==
=== Singles ===
- (Argentina) María Lourdes Carlé def. (Romania) Gabriela Lee 6–4, 7–6^{(7–4)}

=== Doubles ===
- (United States) Allura Zamarripa / (United States) Maribella Zamarripa def. (United States) Hailey Baptiste / (United States) Whitney Osuigwe 6–3, 3–6, [10–4]

== Singles main draw entrants ==
=== Seeds ===
Country	Player	Rank^{1}	Seed
MEX	Renata Zarazúa	97	1
ARG	María Lourdes Carlé	124	2
USA	Hailey Baptiste	130	3
USA	Sachia Vickery	137	4
UKR	Yulia Starodubtseva	150	5
USA	Robin Montgomery	194	6
USA	Elvina Kalieva	199	7
	Iryna Shymanovich	211	8

- ^{1} Rankings as of 15 January 2024.

=== Other entrants ===
The following players received wildcards into the singles main draw:

- (Mexico) Fernanda Castillo Huerta
- (United States) Allie Kiick
- (United States) Clervie Ngounoue
- (United States) Madison Sieg

The following player received entry using a junior exempt:

- (Canada) Layne Sleeth

The following player received entry as a special exempt:

- (Switzerland) Leonie Küng

The following players received entry from the qualifying draw:

- (United States) Sophie Chang
- (Japan) Sayaka Ishii
- Maria Kozyreva
- (Romania) Gabriela Lee
- (United States) Lea Ma
- (Italy) Tatiana Pieri
- (France) Irina Ramialison
- (United States) Vivian Wolff
