= 2018 Berkeley Tennis Club Challenge – Doubles =

Doubles
- 2018 Berkeley Tennis Club Challenge

Final
- Champions: (United States) Nicole Gibbs (United States) Asia Muhammad
- Runners-up: (Australia) Ellen Perez (United States) Sabrina Santamaria
- Score: 6–4, 6–1

Events
Singles	Doubles
Berkeley Tennis Club Challenge	· 2019 →

This was the first edition of the tournament.

Nicole Gibbs and Asia Muhammad won the title after defeating Ellen Perez and Sabrina Santamaria 6–4, 6–1 in the final.

== Seeds ==
1. (Australia) Ellen Perez / (United States) Sabrina Santamaria (final)
2. (Japan) Nao Hibino / (United States) Jamie Loeb (first round)
3. (France) Manon Arcangioli / (United Kingdom) Tara Moore (quarterfinals)
4. (United States) Maria Sanchez / (Papua New Guinea) Abigail Tere-Apisah (first round)

== Draw ==
=== Key ===
- Q = Qualifier
- WC = Wild card
- LL = Lucky loser
- Alt = Alternate
- SE = Special exempt
- PR = Protected ranking
- ITF = ITF entry
- JE = Junior exempt
- w/o = Walkover
- r = Retired
- d = Defaulted
- SR = Special ranking

=== Draw ===
First round
1	(Australia) E Perez (United States) S Santamaria	6	4	[10]
WC	(United States) M Kessler (United States) A Lahey	4	6	[8]
(Japan) H Arakawa (Romania) A Ghițescu	2	3
(South Africa) C Simmonds (United States) A Weinhold	6	6
4	(United States) M Sanchez (Papua New Guinea) A Tere-Apisah	3	2
(United States) UM Arconada (Australia) A Bai	6	6
WC	(United States) M Manasse (United States) D Starr	1	6	[4]
(United States) Q Gleason (United States) A Kratzer	6	3	[10]
(Australia) K Birrell (Japan) M Doi	3	5
(United States) N Gibbs (United States) A Muhammad	6	7
(United States) M Kobelt (United States) A Zhu	5	1
3	(France) M Arcangioli (United Kingdom) T Moore	7	6
(United States) J Elbaba (United States) C Harrison	6	2	[10]
WC	(United States) K Ahn (United States) E Bektas	4	6	[6]
(United States) F Di Lorenzo (Serbia) J Jakšić	6	6
2	(Japan) N Hibino (United States) J Loeb	3	4

Quarterfinals
1	(Australia) E Perez (United States) S Santamaria	6	6
(South Africa) C Simmonds (United States) A Weinhold	3	2
(United States) UM Arconada (Australia) A Bai	6	5	[10]
(United States) Q Gleason (United States) A Kratzer	4	7	[7]
(United States) N Gibbs (United States) A Muhammad	6	6
3	(France) M Arcangioli (United Kingdom) T Moore	4	4
(United States) J Elbaba (United States) C Harrison	5	6	[7]
(United States) F Di Lorenzo (Serbia) J Jakšić	7	4	[10]

Semifinals
1	(Australia) E Perez (United States) S Santamaria	6	6
(United States) UM Arconada (Australia) A Bai	3	2
(United States) N Gibbs (United States) A Muhammad	6	6
(United States) F Di Lorenzo (Serbia) J Jakšić	4	3

Final
1	(Australia) E Perez (United States) S Santamaria	4	1
(United States) N Gibbs (United States) A Muhammad	6	6
