= 2023 Vero Beach International Tennis Open – Singles =

Singles
- 2023 Vero Beach International Tennis Open

Final
- Champion: (Belgium) Marie Benoît
- Runner-up: (United States) Emma Navarro
- Score: 6–2, 7–5

Events
Singles	Doubles
← 2022 ·	Vero Beach International Tennis Open	· 2024 →

Sophie Chang was the defending champion, but chose not to participate.

Marie Benoît won the title, defeating Emma Navarro in the final, 6–2, 7–5.

== Seeds ==
1. (Hungary) Réka Luca Jani (first round)
2. (United States) Emma Navarro (final)
3. (United States) Hailey Baptiste (second round)
4. (United States) Louisa Chirico (first round)
5. (Mexico) Fernanda Contreras Gómez (first round)
6. (United States) Kayla Day (first round)
7. (United States) Peyton Stearns (quarterfinals)
8. (United States) Elvina Kalieva (semifinals)

== Draw ==
=== Key ===
- Q = Qualifier
- WC = Wild card
- LL = Lucky loser
- Alt = Alternate
- SE = Special exempt
- PR = Protected ranking
- ITF = ITF entry
- JE = Junior exempt
- w/o = Walkover
- r = Retired
- d = Defaulted
- SR = Special ranking

=== Finals ===
Semifinals
(Belgium) Marie Benoît	7^{7}	6
8	(United States) Elvina Kalieva	6^{2}	2
Vera Lapko	2	0^{r}
2	(United States) Emma Navarro	6	0

Final
(Belgium) Marie Benoît	6	7
2	(United States) Emma Navarro	2	5

=== Top half ===
First round
1	(Hungary) RL Jani	6	4	6^{2}
Q	(Bulgaria) L Karatancheva	3	6	7^{7}
(United States) R Kingsley	6	1	3
Q	(United States) A Rogers	4	6	6
WC	(United States) M Kessler	6	5	3
(United States) S Crawford	2	7	6
(Belgium) M Benoît	6	6
5	(Mexico) F Contreras Gómez	3	4
3/WC	(United States) H Baptiste	7^{7}	6
Q	(United States) K Quevedo	6^{1}	3
PR	(Colombia) E Arango	6	6
(Sweden) C Hennemann	2	4
Q	(United States) Q Gleason	7	6
(United States) H Inoue	5	2
Q	(United States) A Smith	2	4
8	(United States) E Kalieva	6	6

Second round
Q	(Bulgaria) L Karatancheva	4	4
Q	(United States) A Rogers	6	6
(United States) S Crawford	4	6	5
(Belgium) M Benoît	6	4	7
3/WC	(United States) H Baptiste	2	3
PR	(Colombia) E Arango	6	6
Q	(United States) Q Gleason	4	5
8	(United States) E Kalieva	6	7

Quarterfinals
Q	(United States) A Rogers	1	4
(Belgium) M Benoît	6	6
PR	(Colombia) E Arango	1	6	0
8	(United States) E Kalieva	6	2	6

Semifinals
(Belgium) M Benoît	7^{7}	6
8	(United States) E Kalieva	6^{2}	2

=== Bottom half ===
First Round
6	(United States) K Day	3	6	6^{5}
(Poland) K Kawa	6	1	7^{7}
(United States) J Loeb	4	3
(United States) W Osuigwe	6	6
V Lapko	6	6
(United States) A Reami	2	4
Q	(United States) K Pierre-Louis	3	6	6
4	(United States) L Chirico	6	3	2
7	(United States) P Stearns	6	7
WC	(United States) M Jones	1	5
(Mexico) AS Sánchez	7	7
Q	(United States) V Osuigwe	5	5
PR	(United States) M Mateas	6^{2}	7	3
(United States) F Di Lorenzo	7^{7}	5	6
Q	(Chinese Taipei) C-y Hsu	3	1
2	(United States) E Navarro	6	6

Second Round
(Poland) K Kawa	6	6
(United States) W Osuigwe	3	3
V Lapko	4	6	6
Q	(United States) K Pierre-Louis	6	3	2
7	(United States) P Stearns	6	6
(Mexico) AS Sánchez	1	3
(United States) F Di Lorenzo	1	3
2	(United States) E Navarro	6	6

Quarterfinals
(Poland) K Kawa	6	3	4
V Lapko	1	6	6
7	(United States) P Stearns	3	6	2
2	(United States) E Navarro	6	3	6

Semifinals
V Lapko	2	0^{r}
2	(United States) E Navarro	6	0
