= 2023 Berkeley Tennis Club Challenge – Singles =

Singles
- 2023 Berkeley Tennis Club Challenge

Final
- Champion: (Canada) Marina Stakusic
- Runner-up: (United States) Allie Kiick
- Score: 6–3, 6–4

Events
Singles	Doubles
- Berkeley Tennis Club Challenge

Madison Brengle was the defending champion, but she retired from her quarterfinal match against Marina Stakusic.

Stakusic won the title, defeating Allie Kiick in the final, 6–3, 6–4.

== Seeds ==
1. (United States) Madison Brengle (quarterfinals, retired)
2. (United States) Katie Volynets (first round)
3. (Canada) Katherine Sebov (second round)
4. (France) Elsa Jacquemot (semifinals)
5. (Switzerland) Lulu Sun (second round)
6. Tatiana Prozorova (quarterfinals)
7. (Mexico) Marcela Zacarías (first round)
8. (United States) Makenna Jones (first round)

== Draw ==
Key

- Q = Qualifier
- WC = Wild card
- LL = Lucky loser
- Alt = Alternate
- ITF = ITF entry
- PR = Protected ranking
- SR = Special ranking
- SE = Special exempt
- JE = Junior exempt
- JR = Junior Accelerator Programme entrant
- CO = College Accelerator Programme entrant
- NG = Next Gen Accelerator Program entrant
- w/o = Walkover
- r = Retired
- d = Defaulted

=== Finals ===
Semifinals
SR	(Canada) Marina Stakusic	6	6
Q	(United States) Ellie Douglas	3	2
4	(France) Elsa Jacquemot	6^{5}	2
Q	(United States) Allie Kiick	7^{7}	6

Final
SR	(Canada) Marina Stakusic	6	6
Q	(United States) Allie Kiick	3	4

=== Top half ===
First round
1	(United States) M Brengle	6	6
(India) S Yamalapalli	0	2
(Denmark) J Svendsen	4	6	7
(Australia) A Bozovic	6	2	5
(United States) L Hovde	5	3
SR	(Canada) M Stakusic	7	6
(Canada) V Mboko	6	6
7	(Mexico) M Zacarías	2	2
3	(Canada) K Sebov	6	6
Q	M Kozyreva	3	3
Q	(United States) E Douglas	7	6
Q	(United States) L Ma	5	2
(United States) J Aney	6	3	4
WC	(United States) J DeFalco	3	6	6
(United States) J Loeb	3	4
5	(Switzerland) L Sun	6	6

Second round
1	(United States) M Brengle	6	6
(Denmark) J Svendsen	3	3
SR	(Canada) M Stakusic	6	6
(Canada) V Mboko	4	3
3	(Canada) K Sebov	2	6^{3}
Q	(United States) E Douglas	6	7^{8}
WC	(United States) J DeFalco	6	6
5	(Switzerland) L Sun	3	4

Quarterfinals
1	(United States) M Brengle	4	0^{r}
SR	(Canada) M Stakusic	6	2
Q	(United States) E Douglas	6^{6}	6	6
WC	(United States) J DeFalco	7^{8}	4	3

Semifinals
SR	(Canada) M Stakusic	6	6
Q	(United States) E Douglas	3	2

=== Bottom half ===
First round
8	(United States) M Jones	6^{1}	3
(United States) V Hu	7^{7}	6
Q	(France) M Partaud	2	3
Q	(Ukraine) H Poznikhirenko	6	6
WC	(United States) C Ngounoue	2	2
(United States) S Chang	6	6
(United States) H Chang	6^{8}	1
4	(France) E Jacquemot	7^{10}	6
6	T Prozorova	6	6
WC	(United States) H Giavara	3	3
(United States) M Kessler	7^{8}	6
WC	(United States) A Noel	6^{6}	2
Q	(United States) K McKenzie	2	2
Q	(Canada) JL Alsola	6	6
Q	(United States) A Kiick	6	6
2	(United States) K Volynets	2	3

Second round
(United States) V Hu	7^{8}	6
Q	(Ukraine) H Poznikhirenko	6^{2}	1
(United States) S Chang	7	6^{3}	5
4	(France) E Jacquemot	5	7^{7}	7
6	T Prozorova	6	7^{7}
(United States) M Kessler	2	6^{3}
Q	(Canada) JL Alsola	4	2
Q	(United States) A Kiick	6	6

Quarterfinals
(United States) V Hu	1	0
4	(France) E Jacquemot	6	6
6	T Prozorova	6	3	6^{3}
Q	(United States) A Kiick	2	6	7^{7}

Semifinals
4	(France) E Jacquemot	6^{5}	2
Q	(United States) A Kiick	7^{7}	6
