= Sportsmen's Tennis Club Challenger =

ITF Women's Tour
- Event name: Boston
- Location: Boston, United States
- Venue: Sportsmen's Tennis Club
- Category: ITF Women's Circuit
- Surface: Hard
- Draw: 32S/32Q/16D
- Prize money: $50,000

The Sportsmen's Tennis Club Challenger was a tournament for professional female tennis players played on outdoor hard courts. The event was classified as a $50,000 ITF Women's Circuit tournament and was held in Boston, United States, from 2007 to 2011.

== Past finals ==
=== Singles ===
| Year | Champion | Runner-up | Score |
|---|---|---|---|
| 2011 | (Slovenia) Petra Rampre | (Ukraine) Tetiana Luzhanska | 6–4, 5–7, 6–4 |
| 2010 | (United States) Jamie Hampton | (United States) Madison Brengle | 6–2, 6–1 |
| 2009 | (Netherlands) Michaëlla Krajicek | (Canada) Rebecca Marino | 6–3, 6–4 |
| 2008 | (Georgia (country)) Anna Tatishvili | (Chinese Taipei) Chan Chin-wei | 2–6, 6–1, 6–3 |
| 2007 | (Uzbekistan) Varvara Lepchenko | (Republic of Ireland) Kelly Liggan | 6–2, 5–7, 5–0, ret. |

=== Doubles ===
| Year | Champions | Runners-up | Score |
|---|---|---|---|
| 2011 | (Ukraine) Tetiana Luzhanska (United States) Alexandra Mueller | (Canada) Sharon Fichman (Canada) Marie-Ève Pelletier | 7–6^{(7–3)}, 6–3 |
| 2010 | (United States) Kimberly Couts (Ukraine) Tetiana Luzhanska | (United States) Lindsay Lee-Waters (United States) Megan Moulton-Levy | 6–4, 3–6, [10–8] |
| 2009 | (Brazil) Maria Fernanda Alves (United States) Ahsha Rolle | (United States) Mallory Cecil (United States) Megan Moulton-Levy | 6–1, 4–6, [10–6] |
| 2008 | (Chinese Taipei) Chan Chin-wei (South Africa) Natalie Grandin | (France) Youlia Fedossova (United States) Varvara Lepchenko | 6–4, 6–3 |
| 2007 | (Hungary) Melinda Czink (South Africa) Natalie Grandin | (Latvia) Līga Dekmeijere (Turkey) İpek Şenoğlu | 6–1, 6–3 |
