= 2019 Berkeley Tennis Club Challenge – Doubles =

Doubles
- 2019 Berkeley Tennis Club Challenge

Final
- Champions: (United States) Madison Brengle (United States) Sachia Vickery
- Runners-up: (United States) Francesca Di Lorenzo (United Kingdom) Katie Swan
- Score: 6–3, 7–5

Events
Singles	Doubles
← 2018 ·	Berkeley Tennis Club Challenge	· 2021 →

Nicole Gibbs and Asia Muhammad were the defending champions, but both players chose not to participate.

Madison Brengle and Sachia Vickery won the title, defeating Francesca Di Lorenzo and Katie Swan in the final, 6–3, 7–5.

== Seeds ==
1. (Mexico) Giuliana Olmos / (Brazil) Luisa Stefani (semifinals)
2. (Chinese Taipei) Hsieh Yu-chieh / (China) You Xiaodi (quarterfinals)
3. (South Korea) Han Na-lae / (Japan) Hiroko Kuwata (quarterfinals)
4. (Chinese Taipei) Chen Pei-hsuan / (Chinese Taipei) Wu Fang-hsien (quarterfinals)

== Draw ==
=== Key ===
- Q = Qualifier
- WC = Wild card
- LL = Lucky loser
- Alt = Alternate
- SE = Special exempt
- PR = Protected ranking
- ITF = ITF entry
- JE = Junior exempt
- w/o = Walkover
- r = Retired
- d = Defaulted
- SR = Special ranking

=== Draw ===
First round
1	(Mexico) G Olmos (Brazil) L Stefani	6	6
(Australia) L Cabrera (Australia) Z Hives	3	4
(Japan) J Namigata (Japan) M Yonehara	6	6
Alt	(Oman) F Al-Nabhani (South Korea) D-b Kim	3	3
3	(South Korea) N-l Han (Japan) H Kuwata	6	6
(Japan) H Arakawa (Japan) A Shimizu	4	4
(United States) F Di Lorenzo (United Kingdom) K Swan	6	6
(United States) B Boren (United States) G Brodsky	3	4
(United States) K Ahn (United States) C Harrison	7^{7}	6
(Israel) D Khazaniuk (South Africa) C Simmonds	6^{4}	4
WC	(United States) M Thiel (United States) C Van Nguyen	2	4
4	(Chinese Taipei) P-h Chen (Chinese Taipei) F-h Wu	6	6
(United States) M Brengle (United States) S Vickery	6^{5}	6	[10]
WC	(United States) A Zamarripa (United States) M Zamarripa	7^{7}	2	[5]
(United States) S Marand (United Kingdom) T Moore	4	1
2	(Chinese Taipei) Y-c Hsieh (China) X You	6	6

Quarterfinals
1	(Mexico) G Olmos (Brazil) L Stefani	6	6
(Japan) J Namigata (Japan) M Yonehara	1	1
3	(South Korea) N-l Han (Japan) H Kuwata	6^{5}	3
(United States) F Di Lorenzo (United Kingdom) K Swan	7^{7}	6
(United States) K Ahn (United States) C Harrison	7^{7}	6
4	(Chinese Taipei) P-h Chen (Chinese Taipei) F-h Wu	6^{3}	0
(United States) M Brengle (United States) S Vickery	6	7
2	(Chinese Taipei) Y-c Hsieh (China) X You	0	5

Semifinals
1	(Mexico) G Olmos (Brazil) L Stefani	3	7^{7}	[9]
(United States) F Di Lorenzo (United Kingdom) K Swan	6	6^{2}	[11]
(United States) K Ahn (United States) C Harrison	1	0
(United States) M Brengle (United States) S Vickery	6	6

Final
(United States) F Di Lorenzo (United Kingdom) K Swan	3	5
(United States) M Brengle (United States) S Vickery	6	7
