= 2024 Vero Beach International Tennis Open – Singles =

Tennis tournament in Florida, US

Singles
- 2024 Vero Beach International Tennis Open

Final
- Champion: (Argentina) María Lourdes Carlé
- Runner-up: (Romania) Gabriela Lee
- Score: 6–4, 7–6^{(7–4)}

Events
Singles	Doubles
← 2023 ·	Vero Beach International Tennis Open	· 2025 →

Marie Benoît is the defending champion, but she lost in the second round to María Lourdes Carlé.

Carlé won the title, defeating Gabriela Lee in the final, 6–4, 7–6^{(7–4)}.

== Seeds ==
1. (Mexico) Renata Zarazúa (quarterfinals)
2. (Argentina) María Lourdes Carlé (champion)
3. (United States) Hailey Baptiste (semifinal)
4. (United States) Sachia Vickery (second round)
5. (Ukraine) Yulia Starodubtseva (quarterfinals)
6. (United States) Robin Montgomery (first round)
7. (United States) Elvina Kalieva (first round)
8. Iryna Shymanovich (first round)

== Draw ==
Key

- Q = Qualifier
- WC = Wild card
- LL = Lucky loser
- Alt = Alternate
- ITF = ITF entry
- PR = Protected ranking
- SR = Special ranking
- SE = Special exempt
- JE = Junior exempt
- JR = Junior Accelerator Programme entrant
- CO = College Accelerator Programme entrant
- NG = Next Gen Accelerator Program entrant
- w/o = Walkover
- r = Retired
- d = Defaulted

=== Finals ===
Semifinals
Q	(Romania) Gabriela Lee	6	6
3	(United States) Hailey Baptiste	3	2
Q	Maria Kozyreva	7	4	5
2	(Argentina) María Lourdes Carlé	5	6	7

Final
Q	(Romania) Gabriela Lee	4	6^{4}
2	(Argentina) María Lourdes Carlé	6	7^{7}

=== Top half ===
First round
1	(Mexico) R Zarazúa	6	6
V Miroshnichenko	2	1
Q	(United States) L Ma	2^{r}
Q	(United States) S Chang	4
SE	(Switzerland) L Küng	6	6
(United States) G Min	1	2
Q	(Romania) G Lee	6	6
6	(United States) R Montgomery	2	0
3	(United States) H Baptiste	6	6
Q	(France) I Ramialison	2	1
(Georgia (country)) E Gorgodze	2	3
Q	(United States) V Wolff	6	6
(Ukraine) V Strakhova	6	1	4
(Canada) C Zhao	1	6	6
(United States) L Chirico	3	2
5	(Ukraine) Y Starodubtseva	6	6

Second round
1	(Mexico) R Zarazúa	4	6	6
Q	(United States) S Chang	6	4	4
SE	(Switzerland) L Küng	5	6^{1}
Q	(Romania) G Lee	7	7^{7}
3	(United States) H Baptiste	6	4	6
Q	(United States) V Wolff	4	6	4
(Canada) C Zhao	4	3
5	(Ukraine) Y Starodubtseva	6	6

Quarterfinals
1	(Mexico) R Zarazúa	4	6^{5}
Q	(Romania) G Lee	6	7^{7}
3	(United States) H Baptiste	7	6
5	(Ukraine) Y Starodubtseva	5	2

Semifinals
Q	(Romania) G Lee	6	6
3	(United States) H Baptiste	3	2

=== Bottom half ===
First round
7	(United States) E Kalieva	4	6	5
JE	(Canada) L Sleeth	6	3	7
Q	(Italy) T Pieri	1	6	6
(United States) V Lepchenko	6	3	3
WC	(United States) A Kiick	6	6^{4}	2
Q	M Kozyreva	2	7^{7}	6
(Belgium) S Costoulas	6	3	2
4	(United States) S Vickery	2	6	6
8	I Shymanovich	6^{1}	2
WC	(United States) C Ngounoue	7^{7}	6
WC	(Mexico) F Castillo Huerta	1	0
Q	(Japan) S Ishii	6	6
(Belgium) M Benoît	6	3	6
(United States) H Chang	3	6	1
WC	(United States) M Sieg	6	1	1
2	(Argentina) ML Carlé	4	6	6

Second round
JE	(Canada) L Sleeth	3	0
Q	(Italy) T Pieri	6	6
Q	M Kozyreva	6	6
4	(United States) S Vickery	3	3
WC	(United States) C Ngounoue	6	6
Q	(Japan) S Ishii	4	3
(Belgium) M Benoît	6^{4}	6	4
2	(Argentina) ML Carlé	7^{7}	3	6

Quarterfinals
Q	(Italy) T Pieri	3	2
Q	M Kozyreva	6	6
WC	(United States) C Ngounoue	3	6	2
2	(Argentina) ML Carlé	6	3	6

Semifinals
Q	M Kozyreva	7	4	5
2	(Argentina) ML Carlé	5	6	7
