= 2023 Vero Beach International Tennis Open – Doubles =

Doubles
- 2023 Vero Beach International Tennis Open

Final
- Champions: (United States) Francesca Di Lorenzo (United States) Makenna Jones
- Runners-up: (United States) Quinn Gleason (France) Elixane Lechemia
- Score: 4–6, 6–3, [10–3]

Events
| Singles | Doubles |
| ← 2022 · | Vero Beach International Tennis Open | · 2024 → |

Sophie Chang and Allie Kiick were the defending champions, but chose not to participate this year.

Francesca Di Lorenzo and Makenna Jones won the title, defeating Quinn Gleason and Elixane Lechemia in the final, 4–6, 6–3, [10–3].

== Seeds ==
1. (United States) Quinn Gleason / (France) Elixane Lechemia (final)
2. (United States) Adriana Reami / (United States) Anna Rogers (semifinals)
3. (Belgium) Marie Benoît / (Sweden) Caijsa Hennemann (quarterfinals)
4. (United States) Francesca Di Lorenzo / (United States) Makenna Jones (champions)

== Draw ==
=== Key ===
- Q = Qualifier
- WC = Wild card
- LL = Lucky loser
- Alt = Alternate
- SE = Special exempt
- PR = Protected ranking
- ITF = ITF entry
- JE = Junior exempt
- w/o = Walkover
- r = Retired
- d = Defaulted
- SR = Special ranking

=== Draw ===
First round
1 | (United States) Q Gleason (France) E Lechemia | 6 | 6
(Bulgaria) D Evtimova (Chinese Taipei) C-y Hsu | 3 | 4
(Bulgaria) E Tchakarova (Bulgaria) V Tchakarova | 1 | 1
(United States) J Hart (United States) A Smith | 6 | 6
3 | (Belgium) M Benoît (Sweden) C Hennemann | 6 | 6
(United States) J Fenton (United States) M Popovic | 1 | 3
(United States) K Earnest (United States) E Hepburn | 0 | 0
(Colombia) E Arango (United States) M Mateas | 6 | 6
(Czech Republic) V Bervid (Bulgaria) A Karatancheva | 7^{11} | 2 | [5]
(United States) K Pierre-Louis (United States) J Renaud | 6^{9} | 6 | [10]
(United States) Z Hitt (India) P Rachapudi | 5 | 0
4 | (United States) F Di Lorenzo (United States) M Jones | 7 | 6
(Bulgaria) L Karatancheva; M Kononova | 6 | 6
(United States) V Osuigwe (United States) W Osuigwe | 4 | 4
(Mexico) SA Seivane Torres (United States) B Yoris | 1 | 2
2 | (United States) A Reami (United States) A Rogers | 6 | 6

Quarterfinals
1 | (United States) Q Gleason (France) E Lechemia | 4 | 6 | [10]
(United States) J Hart (United States) A Smith | 6 | 1 | [8]
3 | (Belgium) M Benoît (Sweden) C Hennemann | 1 | 1
(Colombia) E Arango (United States) M Mateas | 6 | 6
(United States) K Pierre-Louis (United States) J Renaud | 4 | 1
4 | (United States) F Di Lorenzo (United States) M Jones | 6 | 6
(Bulgaria) L Karatancheva; M Kononova | 2 | 3
2 | (United States) A Reami (United States) A Rogers | 6 | 6

Semifinals
1 | (United States) Q Gleason (France) E Lechemia | 6^{3} | 6 | [10]
(Colombia) E Arango (United States) M Mateas | 7^{7} | 2 | [6]
4 | (United States) F Di Lorenzo (United States) M Jones | 6 | 6
2 | (United States) A Reami (United States) A Rogers | 2 | 2

Final
1 | (United States) Q Gleason (France) E Lechemia | 6 | 3 | [3]
4 | (United States) F Di Lorenzo (United States) M Jones | 4 | 6 | [10]
