= Vero Beach International Tennis Open =

- 2026 Vero Beach International Tennis Open

ITF Women's Tour
- Event name: Vero Beach International Tennis Open
- Founded: 2014; 12 years ago
- Location: Vero Beach, Florida, United States
- Venue: Grand Harbor Golf and Beach Club
- Category: ITF Women's World Tennis Tour
- Surface: Clay / Outdoor
- Website: Official website

The Vero Beach International Tennis Open is a professional women tennis tournament played on clay courts. It is currently part of the ITF Women's World Tennis Tour. The first edition was held in Vero Beach, Florida, United States in late January 2014.

== Past finals ==
=== Singles ===
Year	Champion	Runner-up	Score
2026	(Canada) Bianca Andreescu	(China) You Xiaodi	7–5, 6–1
2025	(Argentina) Solana Sierra	(United States) Whitney Osuigwe	6–7^{(6–8)}, 6–4, 7–5
2024	(Argentina) María Lourdes Carlé	(Romania) Gabriela Lee	6–4, 7–6^{(7–4)}
2023	(Belgium) Marie Benoît	(United States) Emma Navarro	6–2, 7–5
2022	(United States) Sophie Chang	(Belarus) Vera Lapko	6–1, 1–6, 6–2
2021	Not held		
2020	(Chile) Daniela Seguel	(Croatia) Tereza Mrdeža	7–5, 6–4
2015–19	Not held		
2014	(Germany) Laura Siegemund	(Canada) Gabriela Dabrowski	6–3, 7–6^{(12–10)}

=== Doubles ===
Year	Champions	Runners-up	Score
2026	(United States) Allura Zamarripa (United States) Maribella Zamarripa	(Argentina) Jazmín Ortenzi (United States) Anna Rogers	Walkover
2025	(United States) Carmen Corley (Netherlands) Eva Vedder	(France) Julie Belgraver (Netherlands) Jasmijn Gimbrère	6–2, 6–3
2024	(United States) Allura Zamarripa (United States) Maribella Zamarripa	(United States) Hailey Baptiste (United States) Whitney Osuigwe	6–3, 3–6, [10–4]
2023	(United States) Francesca Di Lorenzo (United States) Makenna Jones	(United States) Quinn Gleason (France) Elixane Lechemia	4–6, 6–3, [10–3]
2022	(United States) Sophie Chang (United States) Allie Kiick	(United States) Anna Rogers (United States) Christina Rosca	6–3, 6–3
2021	Not held		
2020	(Chinese Taipei) Hsu Chieh-yu (Hungary) Panna Udvardy	(Spain) Irene Burillo Escorihuela (Spain) Andrea Lázaro García	7–5, 4–6, [10–7]
2015–19	Not held		
2014	(Russia) Irina Khromacheva (United States) Allie Will	(United States) Jacqueline Cako (United States) Sanaz Marand	7–5, 6–3
