= Hannah Viller Møller =

Danish tennis player

- Country (sports): Denmark
- Born: 4 August 2001 (age 24)
- Plays: Right (two-handed backhand)
- Prize money: $6,989

Singles
- Career record: 23–16
- Career titles: 0
- Highest ranking: No. 1018 (26 September 2022)
- Current ranking: No. 1235 (1 April 2024)

Doubles
- Career record: 11–6
- Career titles: 1 ITF
- Highest ranking: No. 1017 (6 November 2023)
- Current ranking: No. 1062 (1 April 2024)

Team competitions
- Fed Cup: 0–2
- Last updated on: 6 April 2024.

Hannah Viller Møller (born 4 August 2001) is a Danish tennis player.

On the ITF Junior Circuit, Viller Møller reached a career-high combined ranking of 103, achieved on 2 April 2018.

Viller Møller made her Fed Cup debut for Denmark in 2019.

== Junior Grand Slam performance ==
- Singles:

- Australian Open: 1R (2018)
- French Open: Q2 (2018)
- Wimbledon: Q1 (2018)
- US Open: Q2 (201)8

- Doubles:

- Australian Open: –
- French Open: –
- Wimbledon: –
- US Open: –

== ITF finals ==
=== Singles: 1 (runner–up) ===
Legend W15 tournaments	Finals by surface Clay (0–1)

Result	W–L	Date	Tournament	Tier	Surface	Opponent	Score
Loss	0–1	Jul 2022	ITF Vejle, Denmark	W15	Clay	(Denmark) Johanne Svendsen	1–6, 0–6

=== Doubles: 2 (1 title, 1 runner-up) ===
Legend W15 tournaments	Finals by surface Clay (1–1)

Result	W–L	Date	Tournament	Tier	Surface	Partner	Opponents	Score
Win	1–0	Jul 2022	ITF Vejle, Denmark	W15	Clay	(New Zealand) Valentina Ivanov	(Lithuania) Klaudija Bubelyte (Lithuania) Patricija Paukstyte	6–2, 7–6^{(4)}
Loss	1–1	Jul 2023	ITF Vejle, Denmark	W15	Clay	(Denmark) Rebecca Munk Mortensen	(Ukraine) Anastasiya Soboleva (Ukraine) Daria Yesypchuk	5–7, 6–7^{(3)}
