= Berkeley Tennis Club Challenge =

- 2023 Berkeley Tennis Club Challenge

Women's World Tennis Tour
- Event name: Berkeley Tennis Club Challenge
- Location: Berkeley, United States
- Venue: Berkeley Tennis Club
- Category: ITF Women's Circuit
- Surface: Hard
- Draw: 32S/32Q/16D
- Prize money: $30,000
- Website: www.berkeleytennisclub.org

The Berkeley Tennis Club Challenge is a tournament for professional female tennis players played on outdoor hardcourts. It was classified as a $60,000 ITF Women's Circuit event to 2023. Since 2024 the tournament prize money decreased $30.000. The tournament has been held in Berkeley, United States, since 2018.

== Past finals ==
=== Singles ===
| Year | Champion | Runner-up | Score |
|---|---|---|---|
| 2025 | (Egypt) Merna Refaat | (Denmark) Johanne Svendsen | 4–6, 7–5, 6–1 |
| 2024 | (United States) Iva Jovic | (Canada) Victoria Mboko | 6–3, 2–6, 6–3 |
| 2023 | (Canada) Marina Stakusic | (United States) Allie Kiick | 6–3, 6–4 |
| 2022 | (United States) Madison Brengle (2) | (China) Yuan Yue | 6–7^{(3–7)}, 6–3, 6–2 |
| 2021 | (United States) Usue Maitane Arconada | (Mexico) Marcela Zacarías | 6–1, 6–3 |
| 2020 | cancelled due to the COVID-19 pandemic | | |
| 2019 | (United States) Madison Brengle | (Japan) Mayo Hibi | 7–5, 6–4 |
| 2018 | (United States) Sofia Kenin | (United States) Nicole Gibbs | 6–0, 6–4 |

=== Doubles ===
| Year | Champion | Runner-up | Score |
|---|---|---|---|
| 2025 | (United States) Rasheeda McAdoo (Kenya) Angella Okutoyi | (Italy) Francesca Pace (Poland) Zuzanna Pawlikowska | 7–6^{(7–2)}, 6–4 |
| 2024 | (Australia) Elysia Bolton (United States) Maegan Manasse | (India) Rutuja Bhosale (United States) Ema Burgić | 6–7^{(3–7)}, 6–2, [10–6] |
| 2023 | (United States) Jessie Aney (Colombia) María Herazo González | (Australia) Elysia Bolton (Australia) Alexandra Bozovic | 7–5, 7–5 |
| 2022 | (United States) Elvina Kalieva (United States) Peyton Stearns | (United States) Allura Zamarripa (United States) Maribella Zamarripa | 7–6^{(7–5)}, 7–6^{(7–5)} |
| 2021 | (United States) Sophie Chang (United States) Angela Kulikov | (Chinese Taipei) Liang En-shuo (China) Lu Jiajing | 6–4, 6–3 |
| 2020 | cancelled due to the COVID-19 pandemic | | |
| 2019 | (United States) Madison Brengle (United States) Sachia Vickery | (United States) Francesca Di Lorenzo (United Kingdom) Katie Swan | 6–3, 7–5 |
| 2018 | (United States) Nicole Gibbs (United States) Asia Muhammad | (Australia) Ellen Perez (United States) Sabrina Santamaria | 6–4, 6–1 |
