= Jenna DeFalco =

American tennis player

- Country (sports): USA
- Born: November 13, 2002 (age 24)
- Prize money: $61,322

Singles
- Career record: 0–0 (at ATP Tour level, Grand Slam level, and in Davis Cup)
- Highest ranking: No. 460 (27 November 2023)
- Current ranking: No. 660 (16 November 2026)

Doubles
- Career record: 0–0 (at ATP Tour level, Grand Slam level, and in Davis Cup)
- Last updated on: 30 May 2023.

Jenna DeFalco (born 13 November 2002) is an American professional tennis player. She has a career-high singles ranking of No. 460 by the WTA, achieved on 27 November 2023.

== Early life ==
From Tustin, California, Defalco signed with the LSU women’s tennis program in 2021. After not playing for LSU she joined Pepperdine University in September 2022. However, Defalco was reported to have turned pro before the end of September 2022.

== Career ==
In November 2026, playing as a qualifier, DeFalco reached the final of the W50 Funchal 2026 Tennis Tournament in Portugal, where she faced fifth seed Arantxa Rus of the Netherlands, winning in three sets.

== Personal life ==
Deflaco was a vegetarian for four years prior to becoming a vegan in 2019.
