= Mayo Hibi =

Japanese tennis player (born 1996)

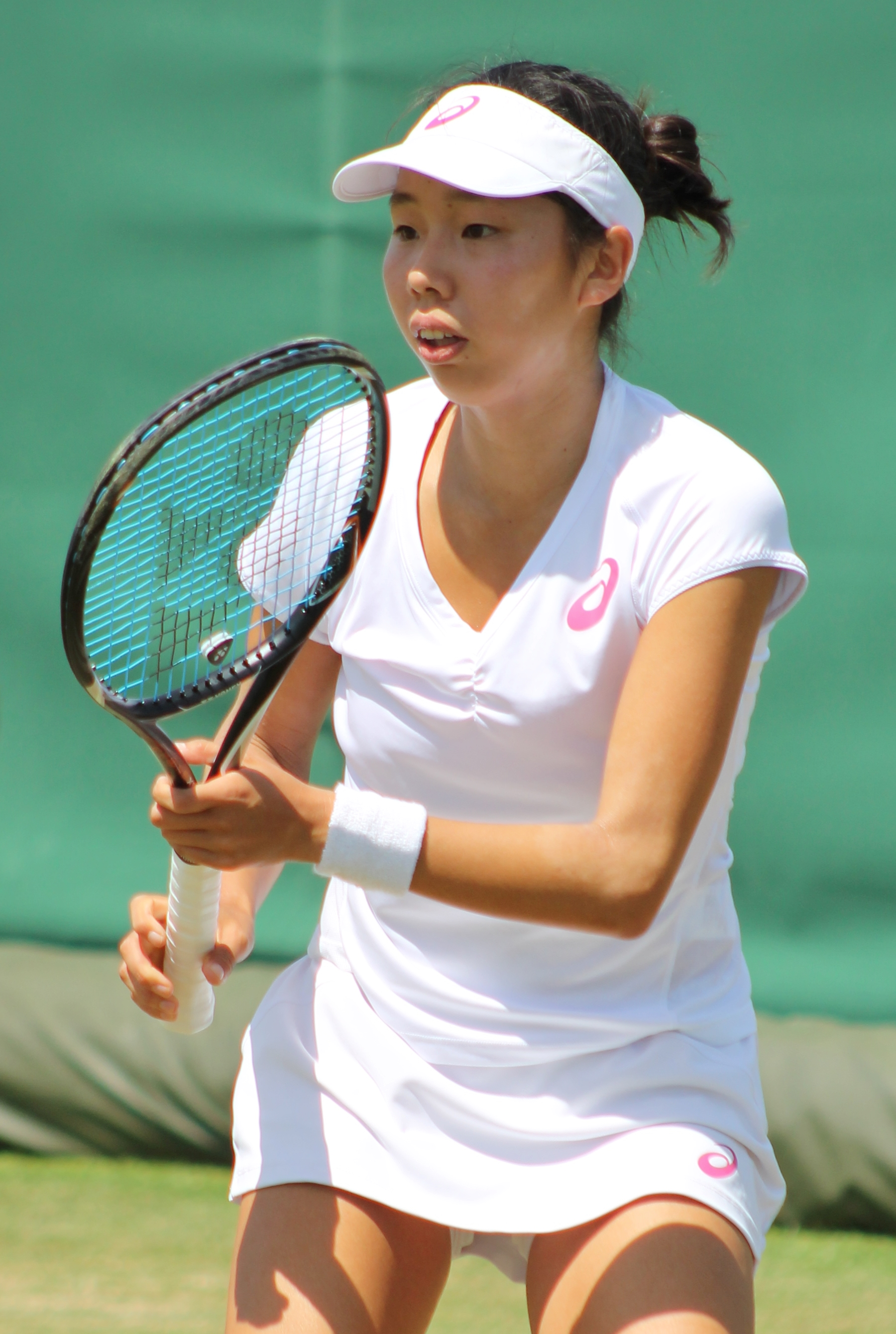
- Hibi at the 2014 Wimbledon qualifying tournament
- Country (sports): Japan
- Born: 3 April 1996 (age 30) Toyonaka, Japan
- Height: 1.65 m (5 ft 5 in)
- Retired: 2021
- Plays: Right (one-handed backhand)
- Prize money: $527,403

Singles
- Career record: 287–197
- Career titles: 8 ITF
- Highest ranking: No. 157 (3 February 2020)

Grand Slam singles results
- Australian Open: 1R (2021)
- French Open: Q2 (2020, 2021)
- Wimbledon: Q2 (2014, 2021)
- US Open: 1R (2015)

Doubles
- Career record: 48–67
- Career titles: 1 ITF
- Highest ranking: No. 378 (26 May 2014)

Mayo Hibi (日比 万葉, Hibi Mayo; born 3 April 1996) is a Japanese former professional tennis player.

Over her career, she won eight singles titles and one doubles title on the ITF Women's Circuit. On 3 February 2020, she reached her best singles ranking of world No. 157. On 26 May 2014, she peaked at No. 378 in the WTA doubles rankings.

Hibi won her first $50k tournament at the 2013 FSP Gold River Women's Challenger, defeating Madison Brengle in straight sets in the final.

== Grand Slam singles performance timeline ==
Key
W	F	SF	QF	#R	RR	Q#	P#	DNQ	A	Z#	PO	G	S	B	NMS	NTI	P	NH

(W) winner; (F) finalist; (SF) semifinalist; (QF) quarterfinalist; (#R) rounds 4, 3, 2, 1; (RR) round-robin stage; (Q#) qualification round; (P#) preliminary round; (DNQ) did not qualify; (A) absent; (Z#) Davis/Fed Cup Zonal Group (with number indication) or (PO) play-off; (G) gold, (S) silver or (B) bronze Olympic/Paralympic medal; (NMS) not a Masters tournament; (NTI) not a Tier I tournament; (P) postponed; (NH) not held; (SR) strike rate (events won / competed); (W–L) win–loss record.
To avoid confusion and double counting, these charts are updated at the conclusion of a tournament or when the player's participation has ended.

Tournament	2013	2014	2015	2016	2017	2018	2019	2020	2021	SR	W–L
Australian Open	A	A	A	Q1	A	A	A	Q2	1R	0 / 1	0–1
French Open	A	Q1	A	Q1	A	A	A	Q2	Q2	0 / 0	0–0
Wimbledon	A	A	A	Q1	A	Q3	A	NH	Q2	0 / 0	0–0
US Open	Q2	A	1R	Q1	Q1	Q2	A	A	Q1	0 / 1	0–1
Win–loss	0–0	0–0	0–1	0–0	0–0	0–0	0–0	0–0	0–1	0 / 2	0–2

== ITF Circuit finals ==
=== Singles: 13 (8 titles, 5 runner–ups) ===
Legend $50/60,000 tournaments $25,000 tournaments $10/15,000 tournaments	Finals by surface Hard (8–5)

Result	W–L	Date	Tournament	Tier	Surface	Opponent	Score
Win	1–0	Jun 2012	ITF Hilton Head, United States	10,000	Hard	(Australia) Jessica Moore	6–3, 6–1
Win	2–0	Jun 2013	ITF Las Cruces, United States	25,000	Hard	(Slovenia) Petra Rampre	6–3, 6–0
Win	3–0	Jul 2013	Sacramento Challenger, United States	50,000	Hard	(United States) Madison Brengle	7–5, 6–0
Loss	3–1	Aug 2014	ITF Winnipeg, Canada	25,000	Hard	(Austria) Patricia Mayr-Achleitner	2–6, 2–6
Win	4–1	Jun 2015	ITF Sumter, United States	25,000	Hard	(United States) Lauren Embree	6–4, 3–6, 6–4
Loss	4–2	Apr 2016	Pingshan Open, China	50,000	Hard	(China) Wang Qiang	2–6, 0–6
Win	5–2	Jan 2017	ITF Petit-Bourg, Guadeloupe	15,000	Hard	(Mexico) Giuliana Olmos	6–3, 6–0
Loss	5–3	Mar 2017	Keio Challenger, Japan	25,000	Hard	(Japan) Akiko Omae	5–7, 2–6
Win	6–3	Apr 2017	Kōfu International Open, Japan	25,000	Hard	(South Korea) Han Na-lae	5–7, 6–3, 6–2
Win	7–3	May 2018	ITF Goyang, Korea	25,000	Hard	(Chinese Taipei) Liang En-shuo	6–3, 6–3
Loss	7–4	Jul 2019	Berkeley Challenge, United States	60,000	Hard	(United States) Madison Brengle	5–7, 4–6
Win	8–4	Nov 2019	Las Vegas Open, United States	60,000	Hard	(Ukraine) Anhelina Kalinina	6–2, 5–7, 6–2
Loss	8–5	Jul 2021	ITF Evansville, United States	25,000	Hard	(Canada) Rebecca Marino	3–6, 6–3, 0–6

=== Doubles: 4 (1 title, 3 runner–ups) ===
Legend $25,000 tournaments $10/15,000 tournaments	Finals by surface Hard (1–3)

Result	W–L	Date	Tournament	Tier	Surface	Partner	Opponents	Score
Loss	0–1	May 2012	ITF Sumter, United States	10,000	Hard	(United States) Elizabeth Ferris	(United States) Jan Abaza (United Kingdom) Nicola Slater	6–7^{(1–7)}, 3–6
Loss	0–2	Jun 2013	ITF Las Cruces, United States	25,000	Hard	(United States) Anamika Bhargava	(Bolivia) María Fernanda Álvarez Terán (United States) Keri Wong	2–6, 2–6
Loss	0–3	Apr 2015	ITF León, Mexico	15,000	Hard	(Germany) Kim Grajdek	(Brazil) Maria Fernanda Alves (United States) Danielle Lao	7–5, 6–7^{(5–7)}, [4–10]
Win	1–3	Jan 2017	ITF Petit-Bourg, Guadeloupe	15,000	Hard	(Canada) Carol Zhao	(Denmark) Emilie Francati (Canada) Charlotte Robillard-Millette	2–6, 7–6^{(6–8)}, [11–9]
