= Madison Brengle =

American tennis player (born 1990)

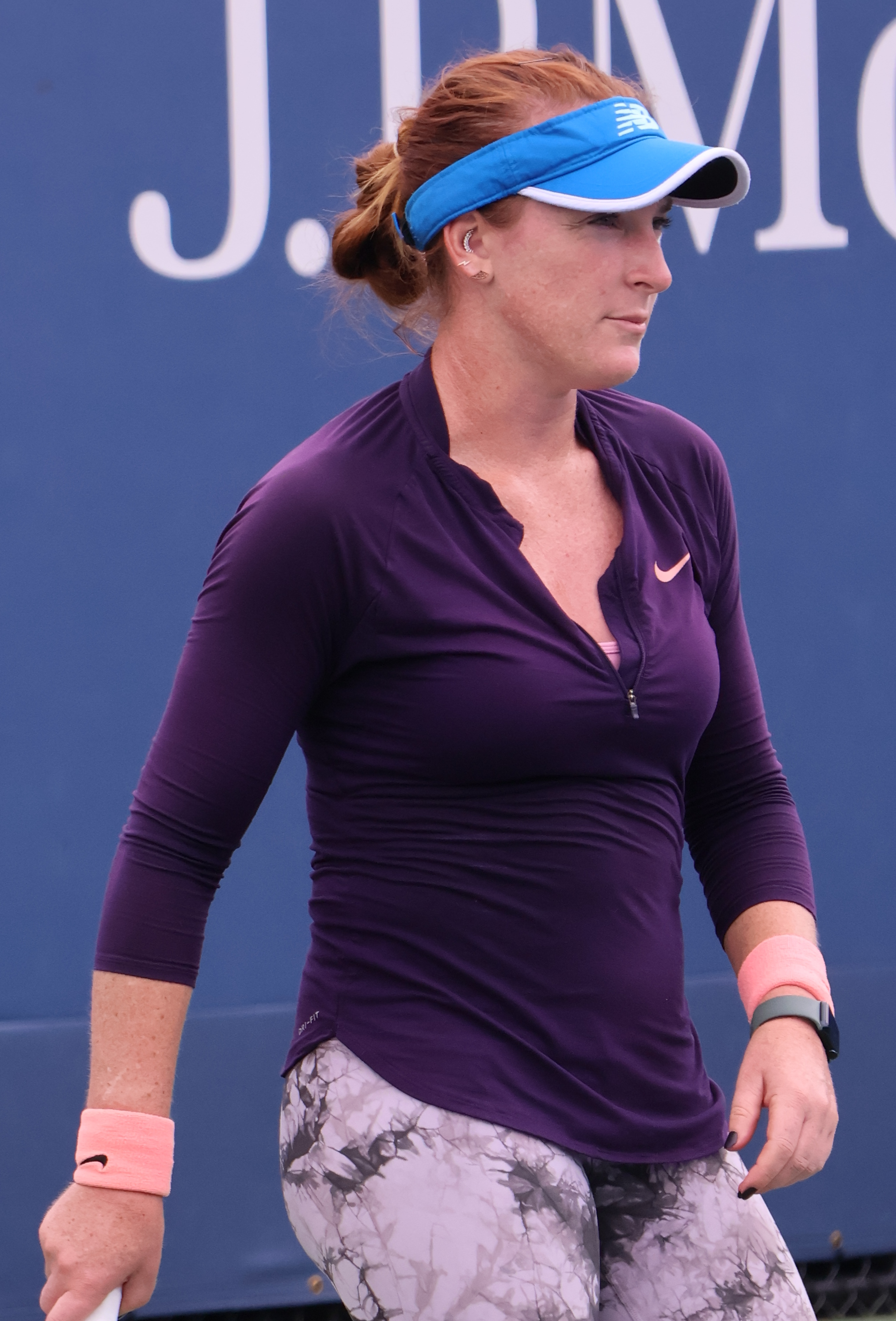
- Brengle at the 2023 US Open
- Country (sports): United States
- Born: April 3, 1990 (age 36) Dover, Delaware, US
- Height: 5 ft 6 in (1.68 m)
- Plays: Right (two-handed backhand)
- Coach: Dr. Dave Marshall & Gaby Brengle
- Prize money: $4,995,680

Singles
- Career record: 649–480
- Career titles: 2 WTA Challengers
- Highest ranking: No. 35 (May 4, 2015)
- Current ranking: No. 212 (August 3, 2026)

Grand Slam singles results
- Australian Open: 4R (2015)
- French Open: 2R (2017, 2021, 2022)
- Wimbledon: 3R (2017, 2021)
- US Open: 3R (2015, 2020)

Doubles
- Career record: 138–206
- Career titles: 1 WTA Challenger
- Highest ranking: No. 86 (May 8, 2017)

Grand Slam doubles results
- Australian Open: 2R (2018)
- French Open: 3R (2016)
- Wimbledon: 2R (2016)
- US Open: 1R (2007, 2015, 2016, 2017, 2019, 2021, 2022)

Mixed doubles
- Career record: 1–2

Grand Slam mixed doubles results
- Wimbledon: 2R (2015)
- Last updated on: 6 August 2026.

Madison Brengle (born April 3, 1990) is an American professional tennis player. Her biggest success came in early 2015 when she reached her first WTA Tour final in January, followed by a fourth round major event appearance at the Australian Open. In May of that year, she reached her career-high singles ranking of No. 35.

Brengle has won two singles titles and one doubles title on the WTA Challenger Tour, and 19 singles and seven doubles titles on the ITF Circuit.

In August 2007, she was ranked fourth in the world in juniors. Brengle then toiled for years in the ITF Circuit. Over the course of 24 consecutive majors from 2008 to 2014, she failed to make it out of the pre-tournament qualifier. The streak ended when she earned a wildcard for the 2014 US Open main draw, which she capitalized on for her first major match-win. Her ranking soon rose into the top 100 for the first time in September 2014.

== Early life ==
Brengle was born and raised in Dover, Delaware, and she is Jewish. Her mother (Gaby née Gamberg) coaches her, her father is Dan Brengle, and she has a brother named David.

== Playing style ==
Brengle is what some coaches call a scrappy player, and her game is built around counter-punching and outlasting her opponents in long rallies while waiting for her opponent's error. When serving she uses an abbreviated service motion. Her forehand has a low follow-through. Sometimes on her backhand she will drive the ball flat, using a half-swing. Brengle moves quickly around the court, and is willing to battle to win her matches.

== Juniors ==
As a teenager, Brengle participated in an experimental USTA training regimen.

In 2006, she won the Easter Bowl doubles championships with Kristy Frilling, defeating Sanaz Marand and Ashley Weinhold in the final. In 2007, Brengle reached the Australian Open girls' singles final, before going down to Anastasia Pavlyuchenkova. Brengle and Julia Cohen were the top seeds at the 2007 French Open girls' doubles competition, but the team lost in the first round.

Seeded seventh, Brengle lost in the final of the Wimbledon girls' singles competition to Urszula Radwańska in three sets. Brengle and Chelsey Gullickson reached the girls' doubles semifinals then lost to top seeds and eventual champions Pavlyuchenkova and Radwańska. In August 2007, she was ranked fourth in the world in juniors.

== Professional ==
=== 2005–2006: Early years, first ITF Circuit title ===
2005 saw Brengle win her first ITF title, when, as a 15-year-old, she won a tournament in Baltimore. In the final, she defeated Beau Jones.

=== 2007–2008: Major debut ===
In 2007, Brengle received wildcard entries into two major tournaments, losing in the first round both times. Accepted into the Australian Open main draw, Brengle lost to ninth-seeded Patty Schnyder. She was allowed another wildcard into the US Open, where she lost to Bethanie Mattek-Sands. Brengle and Ashley Weinhold were doubles wildcards, but lost in the first round of the doubles competition to Stéphanie Foretz and Yaroslava Shvedova.

Brengle won her first WTA Tour match of the season in August by defeating former top-20 player Flavia Pennetta, then losing to Elena Dementieva in the following round at the Los Angeles WTA tournament. In addition, earlier in the year, the American reached the second round of the 2007 French Open qualifying draw.

On the ITF Circuit, Brengle reached three out of four singles finals in the first four months of the year. Brengle and Kristy Frilling won an ITF title in Augusta, Georgia. In the final, the team defeated Angelina Gabueva and Alisa Kleybanova.

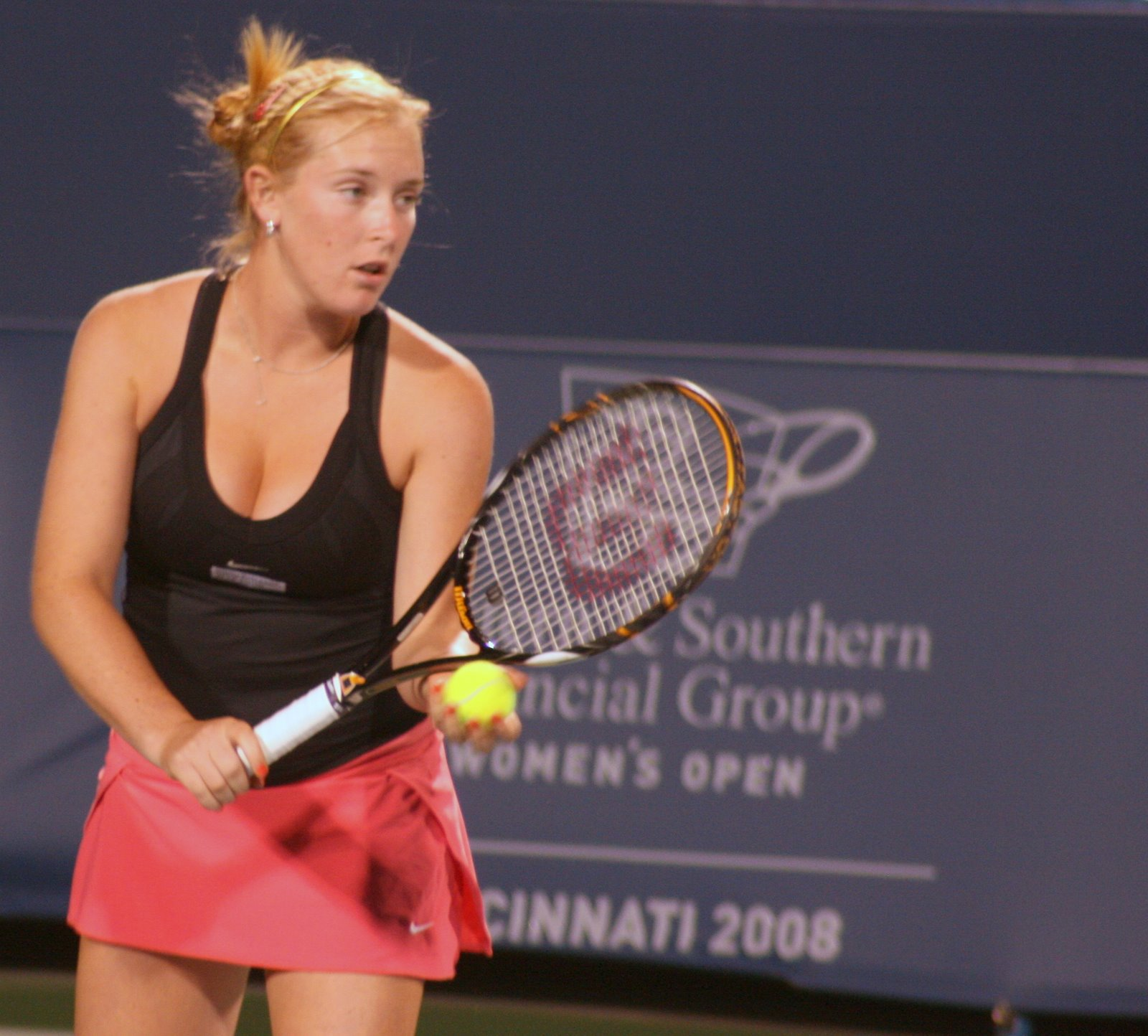
Brengle in 2008

In 2008, Brengle received a wildcard into the French Open (after winning a playoff tournament), defeating Ahsha Rolle in the finals. The US Open and the French Open agreed to exchange wildcards in their respective tournaments.

=== 2009–2013: No appearances at the majors ===
From 2009 to 2013, Brengle failed to qualify for the main draw in any of the four Grand Slam tournaments.

In 2011, Brengle won her second ITF title at Hammond, LA. She also reached the final at another ITF event at Rancho Santa Fe, California. At College Park, she defeated recent Wimbledon third rounder Melinda Czink to win her first WTA Tour match since Quebec City in 2009.

In 2012, Brengle won her third ITF title at Fort Walton Beach, Florida. She also won the doubles title with Paula Kania of Poland.

And in 2013, she won her fourth title at Rancho Santa Fe.

=== 2014: First major win, top 100 debut ===
Brengle had a strong start to her 2014 season, qualifying through to the main draw at the Hobart International, but was narrowly defeated in the first round by top seed Samantha Stosur in a final-set tiebreak. The next week, she lost to Irina-Camelia Begu in the final qualifying round. In July, she won the $50k Lexington Challenger, beating Nicole Gibbs in the final. Later in the year, she was awarded a wildcard into the main draw of the US Open, and she recorded her first Grand Slam match win over Julia Glushko of Israel.

She moved into the top 100 for first time on September 29, 2014 after winning the $50k Redrock Open in Las Vegas, defeating Nicole Vaidišová, Kateryna Bondarenko and Michelle Larcher de Brito.

=== 2015–2016: Australian Open fourth round & career-high ranking ===
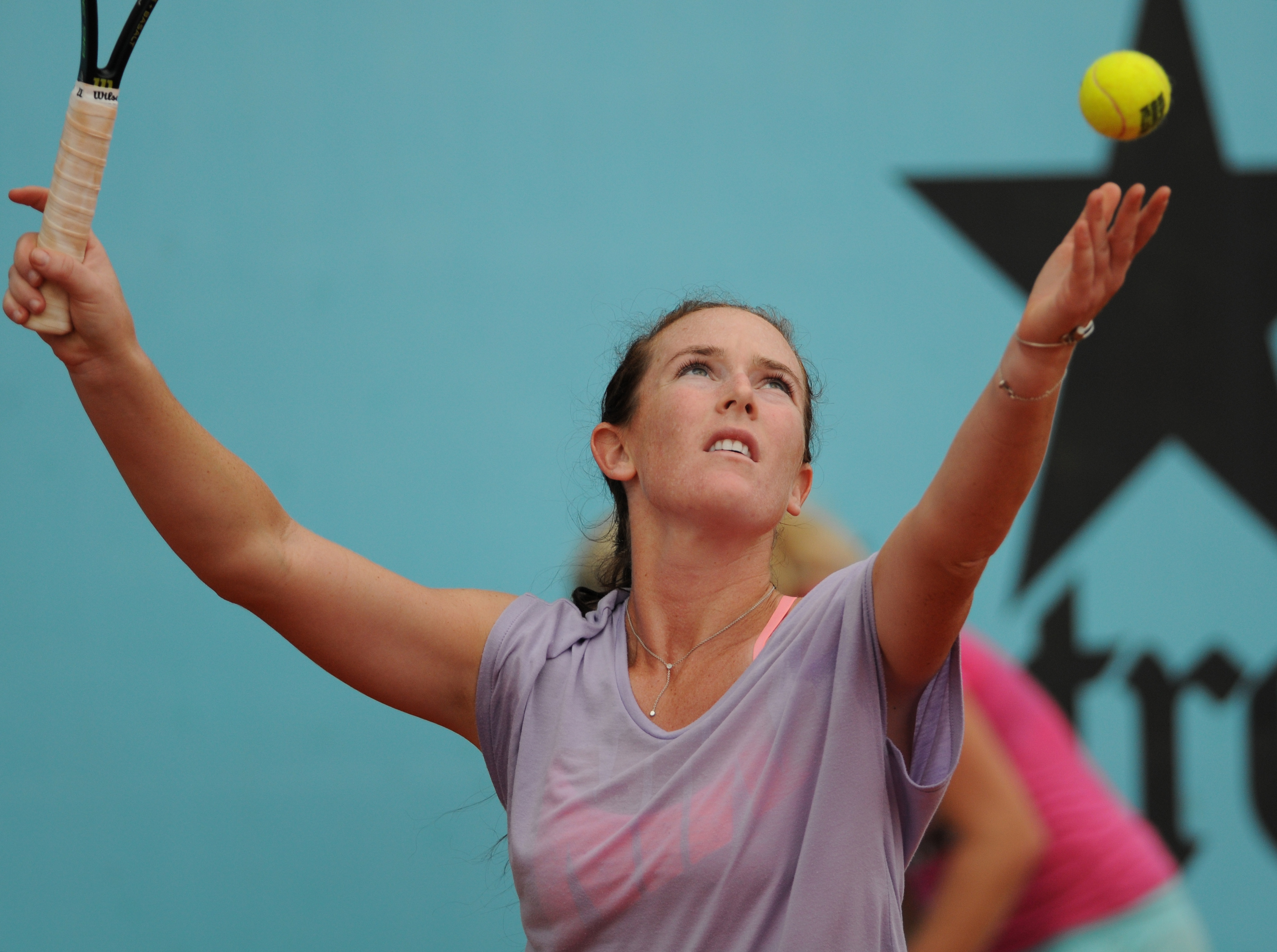
Brengle in 2015

At the 2015 Australian Open, Brengle defeated the 13th-ranked Andrea Petkovic in the first round. Then, she won in straight sets against both Irina Falconi and CoCo Vandeweghe, eventually losing in the fourth round to Madison Keys, 2–6, 4–6. This was her best performance in a Grand Slam tournament so far. In Stuttgart, she defeated No. 4 ranked Petra Kvitová, in straight sets. In May, her singles ranking reached a career-best of No. 35 in the world. She finished the 2015 season ranked No. 40.

In 2016 in Dubai, she defeated No. 8 ranked Kvitová in three sets.

=== 2017: Wimbledon third round ===
Brengle began her season at the Auckland Open. She upset world No. 2, Serena Williams, in her second-round match. She lost in the quarterfinals to seventh seed Jeļena Ostapenko. At the Australian Open, she was defeated in the first round by Alison Riske.

As the top seed at the Midland Tennis Classic, Brengle lost in the first round to Jacqueline Cako.

=== 2019–2020: US Open third round, first WTA 125 title ===
Brengle started her 2019 season at the Auckland Open where she lost in the first round to Eugenie Bouchard.

Brengle began her 2020 season at the Brisbane International and lost in the second round of qualifying to Yulia Putintseva. In Hobart, she fell in the final round of qualifying to Ons Jabeur. At the Australian Open, she lost in the first round to Caroline Garcia, in three sets.

She won her first WTA 125 title at the Newport Beach Challenger, defeating Stefanie Vögele in the final.

At the US Open, she reached the third round for a second time in her career with wins over Arina Rodionova and 19th seed Dayana Yastremska, before losing to Shelby Rogers.

=== 2021: Second WTA 125 title ===
Brengle started her season at the Yarra Valley Classic where she lost in the first round to Anastasija Sevastova. At the Australian Open, she was defeated in the second round by eventual finalist Jennifer Brady.

After the Australian Open, Brengle competed at the Phillip Island Trophy. She was eliminated in the second round by world No. 8, Bianca Andreescu. Getting past qualifying at the Adelaide International, she lost in the first round to eventual champion, Iga Świątek.

She won her second WTA 125 title at the Midland Tennis Classic, defeating Robin Anderson in the final.

=== 2022: Two WTA 1000 third rounds, back to top 50 ===
Brengle started the 2022 season at the Melbourne Summer Set 1 in which she lost in the second round to eventual finalist, Veronika Kudermetova. At the Adelaide International 2, she reached the quarterfinals where she retired against Alison Riske due to a calf injury. At the Australian Open, she won her first-round match when her opponent Dayana Yastremska retired. She was defeated in the second round by Naomi Osaka.

In February, Brengle competed at Dubai but lost in the final round of qualifying to Dayana Yastremska. At the Qatar Open in Doha, she reached the third round before she was defeated by Garbiñe Muguruza. In March, she played at the Indian Wells Open. She lost in the first round to Ann Li in three sets despite having two match points in the second set. At the Miami Open, she upset world No. 30, Liudmila Samsonova, in the second round in straight sets. She was eliminated in the third round by eventual champion Iga Świątek.

Brengle started her clay-court season at the Charleston Open. She retired during the third set of her first-round match against Emma Navarro due to a left knee injury. She returned to action at the Madrid Open. She lost in the first round of qualifying to Dayana Yastremska. As the top seed at the Open de Saint-Malo, she reached the quarterfinals where she was beaten by fifth seed Maryna Zanevska. At the Italian Open, she lost in the final round of qualifying to Elina Avanesyan. However, she earned a lucky loser spot into the main draw but was defeated in the second round by world No. 15, Coco Gauff. At the French Open, she lost in the second round to world No. 7, Aryna Sabalenka.

Brengle started her grass-court season at the Surbiton Trophy. As the top seed, she retired during the third set of her quarterfinal match against Arina Rodionova. At the Rosmalen Open, she lost in the first round to second seed and world No. 17, Belinda Bencic. Seeded second at the first edition of the Veneto Open, she lost in the first round to eventual finalist Sara Errani. In Eastbourne, she was defeated in the first round by British wildcard Harriet Dart. At Wimbledon, she lost in the first round to Lauren Davis.

Brengle started her US Open Series at the Washington Open and lost in the first round to Anna Kalinskaya. Getting past qualifying at the Canadian Open in Toronto, she was defeated in the first round by tenth seed Coco Gauff. As the top seed at the Vancouver Open, she reached the quarterfinals and lost to Emma Navarro. At the Tennis Cleveland, she upset world No. 28, Ekaterina Alexandrova, in the second round. She lost in the quarterfinals to eventual finalist, Aliaksandra Sasnovich. At the US Open, she was beaten in the first round by eventual finalist Ons Jabeur.

As the top seed at the Berkeley Club Challenge, Brengle won her 17th ITF title by defeating second seed Yuan Yue in the final. As the top seed at the Central Coast Open in Templeton, California, she had won her 18th title, beating Robin Montgomery in the final. This was her second straight USTA pro circuit tournament. As a result of winning those two tournaments, her ranking moved back into the top 50, at No. 48 on October 3, 2022. In San Diego, she fell in the first round of qualifying to Caroline Dolehide. As the top seed and defending champion in Georgia at the Tennis Classic of Macon, she defended her title and won her 19th ITF title by beating second seed Panna Udvardy in the final. Seeded second at the Christus Health Challenge, she lost in the first round to Alexis Blokhina. Brengle played her final tournament of the season at the Midland Tennis Classic in Michigan. Seeded second and the defending champion, she lost in the second round to Sofia Kenin.

Brengle ended the year ranked No. 57.

=== 2023: Historic Wimbledon three tie-break match ===
Brengle started her season at the Auckland Open. Seeded sixth, she lost in the first round to Zhu Lin. At the Hobart International, she was defeated in the first round by Bernarda Pera. At the Australian Open, she was eliminated from the tournament in the first round by Claire Liu.

Competing at the Lyon Open, Brengle lost in the first round to second seed, world No. 23, and defending champion Zhang Shuai. At the Linz Open, she got her first win of the year by beating Austrian wildcard Julia Grabher, in the first round. She was defeated in the second round by fifth seed Donna Vekić. In Doha, she lost in the final round of qualifying to Viktoriya Tomova. At Dubai, she lost in the first round of qualifying to Katarina Zavatska. At the first edition of the Texas Open in Austin, she lost her second-round match to eventual champion Marta Kostyuk.

At the WTA 1000 Indian Wells Open, she defeated qualifier Laura Siegemund in the first round, and then lost to No. 23 seed Martina Trevisan in three sets. At the next WTA 1000 event in Miami, Brengle was one game away from beating Amanda Anisimova in the first round before Anisimova retired. Brengle lost in the second round to 22nd seed Donna Vekić, in three sets.

In June at Wimbledon, Brengle defeated Sara Errani, before losing to 21st seed Ekaterina Alexandrova in the second round in the first women's singles match to feature three tie-break sets at the tournament in the Open Era.

At the 2023 US Open, she lost to Linda Nosková in the first round.

== Honors ==
In 2016, Brengle was named to the Delaware Tennis Hall of Fame. She was the youngest person ever to be inducted into the Hall of Fame. That year, she was also the first tennis player granted the Delaware Sportswriters & Broadcasters Association's John J. Brady Delaware Athlete of the Year Award.

== Performance timelines ==
Key
W	F	SF	QF	#R	RR	Q#	P#	DNQ	A	Z#	PO	G	S	B	NMS	NTI	P	NH

(W) winner; (F) finalist; (SF) semifinalist; (QF) quarterfinalist; (#R) rounds 4, 3, 2, 1; (RR) round-robin stage; (Q#) qualification round; (P#) preliminary round; (DNQ) did not qualify; (A) absent; (Z#) Davis/Fed Cup Zonal Group (with number indication) or (PO) play-off; (G) gold, (S) silver or (B) bronze Olympic/Paralympic medal; (NMS) not a Masters tournament; (NTI) not a Tier I tournament; (P) postponed; (NH) not held; (SR) strike rate (events won / competed); (W–L) win–loss record.
To avoid confusion and double counting, these charts are updated at the conclusion of a tournament or when the player's participation has ended.

=== Singles ===
Current through the 2023 US Open.

Tournament	2005	2006	2007	2008	2009	2010	2011	2012	2013	2014	2015	2016	2017	2018	2019	2020	2021	2022	2023	SR	W–L	Win %
Grand Slam tournaments
Australian Open	A	A	1R	1R	Q2	Q1	Q1	Q2	Q1	Q3	4R	3R	1R	1R	2R	1R	2R	2R	1R	0 / 11	8–11	42%
French Open	A	A	Q2	1R	Q1	Q2	Q1	Q2	Q1	Q1	1R	1R	2R	1R	1R	1R	2R	2R	1R	0 / 10	3–10	23%
Wimbledon	A	A	A	A	Q3	Q2	Q1	Q1	Q1	Q3	1R	1R	3R	2R	2R	NH	3R	1R	2R	0 / 8	7–8	47%
US Open	Q1	Q2	1R	Q2	Q1	Q1	Q1	Q1	Q3	2R	3R	1R	1R	1R	1R	3R	1R	1R	1R	0 / 11	5–11	31%
Win–loss	0–0	0–0	0–2	0–2	0–0	0–0	0–0	0–0	0–0	1–1	5–4	2–4	3–4	1–4	2–4	2–3	4–4	2–4	1–4	0 / 40	23–40	37%
WTA 1000 tournaments
Qatar Open	not Master Series			A	not Master Series			A	A	A	NMS	1R	NMS	A	NMS	A	NMS	3R	NMS	0 / 2	1–2	33%
Dubai Championships	not Master Series				A	A	A	not Master Series			A	NMS	1R	NMS	A	NMS	A	NMS	Q1	0 / 1	0–1	0%
Indian Wells Open	A	A	A	1R	A	A	Q1	A	A	Q2	2R	2R	2R	1R	2R	NH	1R	1R	2R	0 / 9	5–9	36%
Miami Open	A	A	A	A	A	A	A	A	A	A	2R	3R	2R	1R	Q2	NH	1R	3R	2R	0 / 7	7–7	50%
Madrid Open	not held				A	A	A	A	A	A	1R	Q2	A	A	A	NH	A	Q1	A	0 / 1	0–1	0%
Italian Open	A	A	A	A	A	A	A	A	A	A	1R	Q1	A	A	A	A	A	2R	A	0 / 2	1–2	33%
Canadian Open	A	A	A	A	A	A	A	Q2	A	A	2R	2R	Q2	A	A	NH	A	1R	A	0 / 3	2–3	40%
Cincinnati Open	not Master Series				A	Q1	Q1	A	A	A	1R	A	A	A	A	Q1	A	A	A	0 / 1	0–1	0%
Pan Pacific / Wuhan Open^{1}	A	A	A	A	A	A	A	A	A	A	2R	2R	Q1	A	A	not held				0 / 2	2–2	50%
China Open	not Master Series				A	A	A	A	A	A	1R	1R	1R	A	A	not held			A	0 / 3	0–3	0%
Win–loss	0–0	0–0	0–0	0–1	0–0	0–0	0–0	0–0	0–0	0–0	4–8	5–6	2–4	0–2	1–1	0–0	0–2	4–5	2–2	0 / 31	18–31	37%
Career statistics
	2005	2006	2007	2008	2009	2010	2011	2012	2013	2014	2015	2016	2017	2018	2019	2020	2021	2022	2023	SR	W–L	Win %
Tournaments	0	0	3	3	2	1	1	1	0	4	26	23	18	11	11	4	14	16	14	Career total: 152		
Titles	0	0	0	0	0	0	0	0	0	0	0	0	0	0	0	0	0	0	0	Career total: 0		
Finals	0	0	0	0	0	0	0	0	0	0	1	0	0	0	0	0	0	0	0	Career total: 1		
Hard win–loss	0–0	0–0	1–3	0–2	1–1	0–1	1–1	0–1	0–0	3–4	19–16	10–16	6–14	1–7	4–7	2–3	2–8	9–10	4–9	0 / 103	63–103	38%
Clay win–loss	0–0	0–0	0–0	0–1	0–1	0–0	0–0	0–0	0–0	0–0	6–8	1–4	2–2	1–3	2–3	0–1	2–3	2–3	1–2	0 / 31	17–31	35%
Grass win–loss	0–0	0–0	0–0	0–0	0–0	0–0	0–0	0–0	0–0	0–0	0–2	5–3	2–2	1–1	1–1	NH	2–3	0–3	1–3	0 / 18	12–18	40%
Overall win–loss^{2}	0–0	0–0	1–3	0–3	1–2	0–1	1–1	0–1	0–0	3–4	25–26	16–23	10–18	3–11	7–11	2–4	6–14	11–16	6–14	0 / 152	92–152	38%
Year-end ranking	777	508	240	225	155	189	192	190	153	94	40	75	82	90	94	81	58	57	149	$4,844,446		

=== Doubles ===
Tournament	2007	...	2015	2016	2017	2018	2019	2020	2021	2022	2023	SR	W–L	Win %
Australian Open	A		A	1R	1R	2R	A	A	1R	1R	1R	0 / 6	1–6	14%
French Open	A		2R	3R	2R	A	A	1R	1R	1R	A	0 / 6	4–6	40%
Wimbledon	A		1R	2R	Q1	A	1R	NH	1R	1R	A	0 / 5	1–5	17%
US Open	1R		1R	1R	1R	A	1R	A	1R	1R	A	0 / 7	0–7	0%
Win–loss	0–1		1–3	3–4	1–3	1–1	0–2	0–1	0–4	0–4	0–1	0 / 24	6–24	20%

Notes

- ^{1} In 2014, the Pan Pacific Open was downgraded to a Premier event and replaced by the Wuhan Open. The Premier 5 tournaments were reclassified as WTA 1000 tournaments in 2021.
- ^{2} Only main-draw results in WTA Tour, Grand Slam tournaments, Billie Jean King Cup, United Cup, Hopman Cup and Olympic Games are included in win–loss records.

== WTA Tour finals ==
=== Singles: 1 (runner-up) ===
Legend International (0–1)	Finals by surface Hard (0–1)

Result	Date	Tournament	Tier	Surface	Opponent	Score
Loss	Jan 2015	Hobart International, Australia	International	Hard	(United Kingdom) Heather Watson	3–6, 4–6

== WTA 125 finals ==
=== Singles: 2 (2 titles) ===
Result	W–L	Date	Tournament	Surface	Opponent	Score
Win	1–0	Jan 2020	Newport Beach Challenger, United States	Hard	(Switzerland) Stefanie Vögele	6–1, 3–6, 6–2
Win	2–0	Nov 2021	Midland Tennis Classic, United States	Hard (i)	(United States) Robin Anderson	6–2, 6–4

=== Doubles: 1 (title) ===
Result	Date	Tournament	Surface	Partner	Opponents	Score
Win	Jun 2022	Veneto Open, Italy	Grass	(United States) Claire Liu	(Russia) Vitalia Diatchenko (Georgia (country)) Oksana Kalashnikova	6–4, 6–3

== ITF Circuit finals ==
=== Singles: 38 (21 titles, 17 runner-ups) ===
Legend W100 tournaments (1–3) W80 tournaments (1–2) W60/75 tournaments (12–3) W50 tournaments (1–1) W25/35 tournaments (5–7) W10 tournaments (1–1)	Finals by surface Hard (17–11) Clay (4–6)

Result	W–L	Date	Tournament	Tier	Surface	Opponent	Score
Win	1–0	Jul 2005	ITF Baltimore, US	10k	Hard	(United States) Beau Jones	6–4, 6–1
Loss	1–1	Jun 2006	ITF Hilton Head, US	10k	Hard	(United States) Julie Ditty	3–6, 2–6
Loss	1–2	Feb 2007	ITF Clearwater, US	25k	Hard	(Slovakia) Stanislava Hrozenská	4–6, 3–6
Loss	1–3	Apr 2007	ITF Hammond, US	25k	Hard	(China) Yuan Meng	2–6, 2–6
Loss	1–4	Jun 2010	Boston Challenger, US	50k	Hard	(United States) Jamie Hampton	2–6, 1–6
Loss	1–5	Feb 2011	Rancho Santa Fe Open, US	25k	Hard	(Portugal) Michelle Larcher de Brito	6–3, 4–6, 1–6
Win	2–5	Mar 2011	ITF Hammond, US	25k	Hard	(France) Stéphanie Foretz	6–3, 6–3
Win	3–5	Mar 2012	ITF Fort Walton Beach, US	25k	Hard	(Croatia) Tereza Mrdeža	6–4, 3–6, 6–3
Win	4–5	Feb 2013	Rancho Santa Fe Open, US	25k	Hard	(United States) Nicole Gibbs	6–1, 6–4
Loss	4–6	Jul 2013	Sacramento Challenger, US	50k	Hard	(Japan) Mayo Hibi	5–7, 0–6
Win	5–6	Aug 2013	Landisville Tennis Challenge, US	25k	Hard	(Australia) Olivia Rogowska	6–2, 6–0
Loss	5–7	Oct 2013	ITF Florence, US	25k	Hard	(Georgia (country)) Anna Tatishvili	2–6, 6–4, 4–6
Win	6–7	Jul 2014	Lexington Challenger, US	50k	Hard	(United States) Nicole Gibbs	6–3, 6–4
Win	7–7	Sep 2014	Las Vegas Open, US	50k	Hard	(Portugal) Michelle Larcher de Brito	6–1, 6–4
Loss	7–8	Apr 2015	Osprey Challenger, US	50k	Clay	(United States) Alexa Glatch	2–6, 7–6^{(6)}, 3–6
Win	8–8	Apr 2016	Osprey Challenger, US	50k	Clay	(Spain) Lara Arruabarrena	4–6, 6–4, 6–3
Win	9–8	Apr 2017	Charlottesville Open, US	60k	Clay	(United States) Caroline Dolehide	6–4, 6–3
Win	10–8	May 2017	ITF Charleston Pro, US	60k	Clay	(United States) Danielle Collins	4–6, 6–2, 6–3
Win	11–8	Feb 2018	Midland Tennis Classic, US	100k	Hard (i)	(United States) Jamie Loeb	6–1, 6–2
Loss	11–9	May 2018	ITF Charleston Pro, US	80k	Clay	(United States) Taylor Townsend	0–6, 4–6
Win	12–9	Aug 2018	Landisville Tennis Challenge, US	60k	Hard	(United States) Kristie Ahn	6–4, 1–0 ret.
Win	13–9	Oct 2018	Stockton Challenger, US	60k	Hard	(United States) Danielle Lao	7–5, 7–6^{(10)}
Loss	13–10	Apr 2019	Charlottesville Open, US	W80	Clay	(United States) Whitney Osuigwe	4–6, 6–1, 3–6
Win	14–10	Jul 2019	Berkeley Challenge, US	W60	Hard	(Japan) Mayo Hibi	7–5, 6–4
Win	15–10	Aug 2019	Landisville Tennis Challenge, US	W60	Hard	(China) Zhu Lin	6–4, 7–5
Loss	15–11	May 2021	ITF Charleston Pro, US	W100	Clay	(United States) Claire Liu	2–6, 6–7^{(6)}
Win	16–11	Oct 2021	Tennis Classic of Macon, US	W80	Hard	(Kazakhstan) Zarina Diyas	6–4, 4–6, 6–4
Win	17–11	Sep 2022	Berkeley Challenge, US	W60	Hard	(China) Yuan Yue	6–7^{(3)}, 6–3, 6–2
Win	18–11	Oct 2022	ITF Templeton Pro, US	W60	Hard	(United States) Robin Montgomery	4–6, 6–4, 6–2
Win	19–11	Oct 2022	Tennis Classic of Macon, US	W60	Hard	(Hungary) Panna Udvardy	6–3, 6–1
Loss	19–12	Aug 2023	Landisville Tennis Challenge, US	W100	Hard	(China) Wang Xinyu	2–6, 3–6
Win	20–12	Oct 2025	ITF San Rafael, US	W35	Hard	(Peru) Lucciana Pérez	7–6^{(9)}, 6–0
Loss	20–13	Jan 2026	ITF Weston, US	W35	Clay	(United States) Akasha Urhobo	2–6, 6–4, 2–6
Loss	20–14	May 2026	ITF Bethany Beach, US	W35	Clay	(United States) Eryn Cayetano	5–7, 1–6
Win	21–14	May 2026	Pelham Pro Classic, US	W50	Clay	(United States) Katrina Scott	6–1, 6–4
Loss	21–15	Jun 2026	ITF Decatur, US	W35	Hard	(United States) Lea Ma	3–6, 6–7^{(3)}
Loss	21–16	Sep 2026	Central Coast Pro Tennis Open, US	W100	Hard	(Germany) Tatjana Maria	3–6, 4–6
Loss	21–17	Oct 2026	ITF Austin, US	W50	Hard	(United Kingdom) Ella McDonald	5–7, 1–6

=== Doubles: 13 (7 titles, 6 runner-ups) ===
Legend W100 tournaments (0–1) W75 tournaments (0–1) W50/60 tournaments (4–2) W25 tournaments (3–2)	Finals by surface Hard (6–3) Clay (1–3)

Result	W–L	Date	Tournament	Tier	Surface	Partner	Opponents	Score
Win	1–0	Oct 2007	ITF Augusta, United States	25k	Hard	(United States) Kristy Frilling	(Russia) Angelina Gabueva (Russia) Alisa Kleybanova	6–3, 6–3
Win	2–0	May 2008	ITF Indian Harbour Beach, US	50k	Clay	(United States) Kristy Frilling	(United States) Raquel Kops-Jones (United States) Abigail Spears	2–6, 6–4, [10–7]
Loss	2–1	Aug 2009	Vancouver Open, Canada	75k	Hard	(United States) Lilia Osterloh	(United States) Ahsha Rolle (United States) Riza Zalameda	4–6, 3–6
Loss	2–2	Apr 2010	Osprey Challenger, US	25k	Clay	(United States) Asia Muhammad	(Argentina) María Irigoyen (Argentina) Florencia Molinero	1–6, 6–7^{(3)}
Win	3–2	Oct 2010	Tennis Classic of Troy, US	50k	Hard	(United States) Asia Muhammad	(Russia) Alina Jidkova (Germany) Laura Siegemund	6–2, 6–4
Loss	3–3	Oct 2011	ITF Rock Hill, US	25k	Hard	(Venezuela) Gabriela Paz	(Croatia) Maria Abramović (Brazil) Roxane Vaisemberg	6–3, 3–6, [5–10]
Win	4–3	Mar 2012	ITF Fort Walton Beach, US	25k	Hard	(Poland) Paula Kania	(Russia) Elena Bovina (France) Alizé Lim	6–3, 6–4
Win	5–3	Oct 2013	ITF Florence, US	25k	Hard	(United States) Anamika Bhargava	(United States) Kristi Boxx (New Zealand) Abigail Guthrie	7–5, 7–5
Win	6–3	Oct 2014	Tennis Classic of Macon, US	50k	Hard	(United States) Alexa Glatch	(United States) Anna Tatishvili (United States) Ashley Weinhold	6–0, 7–5
Loss	6–4	Apr 2017	Charlottesville Open, US	60k	Clay	(United States) Danielle Collins	(Serbia) Jovana Jakšić (Argentina) Catalina Pella	4–6, 6–7^{(5)}
Loss	6–5	May 2019	ITF Charleston Pro, US	W100	Clay	(United States) Lauren Davis	(United States) Taylor Townsend (United States) Asia Muhammad	2–6, 2–6
Win	7–5	Jul 2019	Berkeley Challenge, US	W60	Hard	(United States) Sachia Vickery	(United States) Francesca Di Lorenzo (United Kingdom) Katie Swan	6–3, 7–5
Loss	7–6	Oct 2022	Tennis Classic of Macon, US	W60	Hard	(United States) Maria Mateas	(United States) Anna Rogers (United States) Christina Rosca	4–6, 4–6

== Junior Grand Slam tournament finals ==
=== Girls' singles: 2 (runner-ups) ===
Result	Year	Tournament	Surface	Opponent	Score
Loss	2007	Australian Open	Hard	(Russia) Anastasia Pavlyuchenkova	6–7^{(6)}, 6–7^{(3)}
Loss	2007	Wimbledon	Grass	(Poland) Urszula Radwanska	6–2, 3–6, 0–6

== Wins against top 10 players ==
- Brengle has a 4–21 record against players who were, at the time the match was played, ranked in the top 10.

No.	Player	Rk	Event	Surface	Rd	Score	Rk	Years	Ref
1	(Czech Republic) Petra Kvitová	4	Stuttgart Open, Germany	Clay (i)	2R	6–3, 7–6^{(7–2)}		2015	
2	(Czech Republic) Petra Kvitová	8	Dubai Championships, UAE	Hard	2R	0–6, 7–6^{(7–1)}, 6–3		2016	
3	(United States) Serena Williams	2	Auckland Open, New Zealand	Hard	2R	6–4, 6–7^{(3–7)}, 6–4		2017	
4	(United States) Sofia Kenin	6	Wimbledon Championships, UK	Grass	2R	6–2, 6–4		2021	

- Key: (Rk) first use, opponent rank; (Rd) round; (Rk) 2nd use, player rank; (Ref) reference; (F) final; (SF) semifinal; (QF) quarterfinal; (#R) rounds 4, 3, 2, 1; (RR) round-robin stage; (Q#) qualifying rounds or stages (3), 2, 1.

== See also ==
- List of select Jewish tennis players
