= Francesca Di Lorenzo =

American tennis player

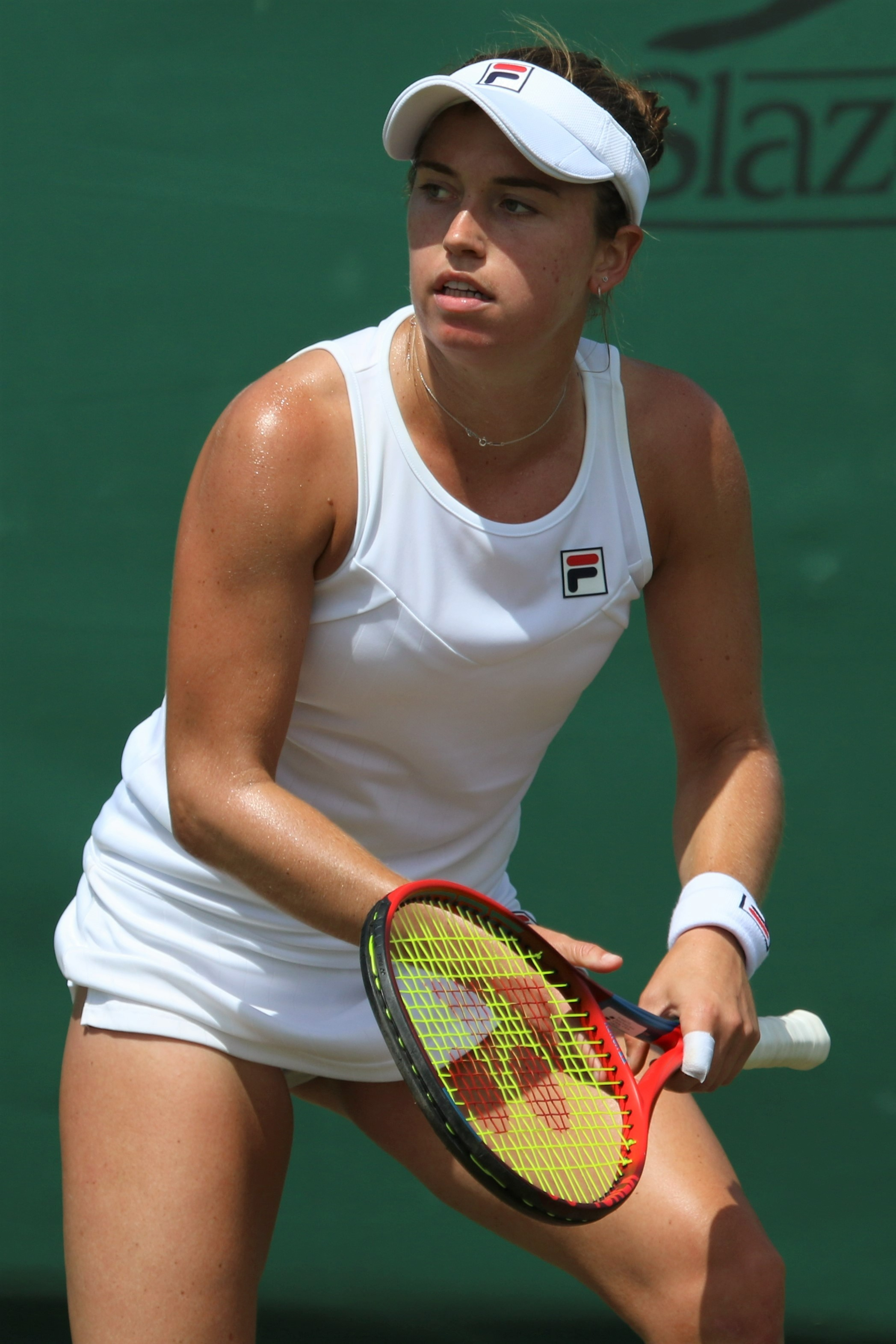
- Di Lorenzo at the 2022 Wimbledon Championships
- Country (sports): United States
- Born: July 22, 1997 (age 29) Pittsburgh, Pennsylvania, US
- Height: 5 ft 7 in (1.70 m)
- Turned pro: 2017
- Plays: Left-handed (two-handed backhand)
- College: Ohio State University
- Coach: Rene Moller
- Prize money: $763,907

Singles
- Career record: 173–162
- Career titles: 4 ITF
- Highest ranking: No. 118 (February 3, 2020)

Grand Slam singles results
- Australian Open: Q2 (2020, 2022)
- French Open: Q2 (2017, 2019, 2021)
- Wimbledon: Q2 (2019)
- US Open: 2R (2018, 2019)

Doubles
- Career record: 71–73
- Career titles: 4 ITF
- Highest ranking: No. 178 (June 12, 2023)

Grand Slam doubles results
- US Open: 1R (2017, 2019)

Francesca Di Lorenzo (Italian pronunciation: [franˈtʃeska di loˈrɛntso]; born July 22, 1997) is an American former tennis player. She is currently assistant coach of the University of Central Florida women's tennis team.

She played collegiately for the Ohio State University. On May 29, 2017, Di Lorenzo and her partner Miho Kowase won the NCAA Women's Doubles Championship.

== Personal life ==
Di Lorenzo was born in Pittsburgh, Pennsylvania but raised in Columbus, Ohio, after her family moved there when she was around the age of seven. Her parents, Carlo and Daniela Di Lorenzo, are Italian immigrants from Salerno. Carlo is a physician at Nationwide Children's Hospital in Columbus and Daniela teaches Italian at various colleges. Di Lorenzo attended New Albany High School in New Albany, Ohio.

She has three siblings, and Cristina, her oldest sister, also played tennis at the collegiate level at Xavier University and graduated in 2017. Mario, her oldest brother, also has an athletic background. He won an intramural championship in the inaugural season of wheelchair basketball at Ohio State University.

Di Lorenzo is fluent in Italian. As a child, she played both tennis and soccer.

== Career ==
=== Amateur years ===
Coming out of high school, Di Lorenzo was ranked as the nation's top tennis recruit. She committed to playing collegiate tennis at Ohio State University. In her final tournament as a junior, she reached the semifinals in both the girls' singles and doubles tournaments at the 2015 US Open.

As a freshman, Di Lorenzo began her season by winning the USTA/ITA National Indoor Intercollegiate Championship, claiming the Buckeyes' first national title in its program's history. She defeated Joana Eidukonytė in the championship match, and concluded the season with a 37–5 record, setting the program record for most victories in a season, and was named singles all-American.

During her sophomore year with the Buckeyes, Di Lorenzo went 37–2 in singles, equaling her school record from the previous year. She also finished the year as the top-ranked women's NCAA singles player. Di Lorenzo repeated as the USTA/ITA National Indoor Champion, beating Hayley Carter in the final. She capped off her sophomore season by winning the NCAA Women's Doubles Championship with her partner, Miho Kowase. This championship was the program's first NCAA in its history. For her accomplishments during the season, Di Lorenzo was named both singles and doubles all-American.

Di Lorenzo earned a wildcard into the qualifiers of the singles tournament at the 2017 US Open. There, she also received a wildcard for the main draw of the doubles tournament and made her Grand Slam debut, partnering with Allie Kiick.

=== Professional ===
On 18 December 2017, Di Lorenzo announced that she would be leaving Ohio State to become a professional tennis player.

She made her major singles debut at the 2018 US Open, winning her section of the qualifying tournament with victories over Antonia Lottner, Verónica Cepede Royg, and Mona Barthel. She defeated Christina McHale to reach the second round, where she lost to No. 13 seed, Kiki Bertens.

== Performance timeline ==
Key
W	F	SF	QF	#R	RR	Q#	P#	DNQ	A	Z#	PO	G	S	B	NMS	NTI	P	NH

(W) winner; (F) finalist; (SF) semifinalist; (QF) quarterfinalist; (#R) rounds 4, 3, 2, 1; (RR) round-robin stage; (Q#) qualification round; (P#) preliminary round; (DNQ) did not qualify; (A) absent; (Z#) Davis/Fed Cup Zonal Group (with number indication) or (PO) play-off; (G) gold, (S) silver or (B) bronze Olympic/Paralympic medal; (NMS) not a Masters tournament; (NTI) not a Tier I tournament; (P) postponed; (NH) not held; (SR) strike rate (events won / competed); (W–L) win–loss record.
To avoid confusion and double counting, these charts are updated at the conclusion of a tournament or when the player's participation has ended.

Only main-draw results in WTA Tour, Grand Slam tournaments, Fed Cup/Billie Jean King Cup and Olympic Games are included in win–loss records.

=== Singles ===
Tournaments	2016	2017	2018	2019	2020	2021	2022	SR	W–L
Grand Slam tournaments
Australian Open	A	A	A	A	Q2	Q1	Q2	0 / 0	0–0
French Open	A	Q2	A	Q2	Q2	Q2	Q1	0 / 0	0–0
Wimbledon	A	Q1	A	Q2	NH	Q1	Q1	0 / 0	0–0
US Open	Q1	Q1	2R	2R	1R	Q2	A	0 / 3	2–3
Win–loss	0–0	0–0	1–1	1–1	0–1	0–0	0–0	0 / 3	2–3
WTA 1000
Indian Wells Open	A	A	A	Q1	NH	Q1	A	0 / 0	0–0
Miami Open	A	A	A	A	NH	Q1	A	0 / 0	0–0
Canadian Open	A	A	A	2R	NH	A	A	0 / 1	1–1
Cincinnati Open	A	A	Q1	A	Q1	A	A	0 / 0	0–0
Career statistics
Tournaments	0	0	2	5	3	2	2	Career total: 14	
Overall win–loss	0–0	0–0	1–2	2–5	0–3	1–2	0–2	0 / 14	4–14
Year-end ranking	346	302	166	121	143	197	292	$763,907	

== ITF Circuit finals ==
=== Singles: 6 (4 titles, 2 runner-ups) ===
Legend $60,000 tournaments $25,000 tournaments $10,000 tournaments	Finals by surface Hard (3–2) Clay (1–0)

Result	W–L	Date	Tournament	Tier	Surface	Opponent	Score
Win	1–0	Aug 2015	ITF Austin, United States	10,000	Hard	(United States) Lauren Herring	4–6, 7–6^{(2)}, 6–2
Win	2–0	Jul 2016	ITF Winnipeg, Canada	25,000	Hard	(Canada) Erin Routliffe	6–4, 6–1
Loss	2–1	Jun 2017	ITF Sumter, United States	25,000	Hard	(United States) Ashley Lahey	3–6, 6–7^{(4)}
Loss	2–2	Jun 2017	ITF Baton Rouge, United States	25,000	Hard	(United States) Nicole Gibbs	3–6, 3–6
Win	3–2	Jan 2018	ITF Wesley Chapel, United States	25,000	Clay	(United States) Whitney Osuigwe	6–2, 1–6, 6–4
Win	4–2	Nov 2019	Toronto Challenger, Canada	W60	Hard	(Belgium) Kirsten Flipkens	7–6^{(3)}, 6–4

=== Doubles: 10 (4 titles, 6 runner-ups) ===
Legend $80,000 tournaments $60,000 tournaments $25,000 tournaments	Finals by surface Hard (2–6) Clay (2–0)

Result	W–L	Date	Tournament	Tier	Surface	Partner	Opponents	Score
Win	1–0	Jul 2016	ITF Winnipeg, Canada	25,000	Hard	(United States) Ronit Yurovsky	(Canada) Marie-Alexandre Leduc (Canada) Charlotte Robillard-Millette	1–6, 7–5, [10–6]
Loss	1–1	Jun 2017	ITF Baton Rouge, US	25,000	Hard	(United States) Julia Elbaba	(Australia) Ellen Perez (Brazil) Luisa Stefani	3–6, 4–6
Loss	1–2	Oct 2017	Challenger de Saguenay, Canada	60,000	Hard (i)	(New Zealand) Erin Routliffe	(Canada) Bianca Andreescu (Canada) Carol Zhao	w/o
Win	2–2	May 2018	Open Saint-Gaudens, France	60,000	Clay	(Australia) Naiktha Bains	(France) Manon Arcangioli (France) Shérazad Reix	6–4, 1–6, [11–9]
Loss	2–3	Feb 2019	Rancho Santa Fe Open, United States	W25	Hard	(United States) Caty McNally	(United States) Hayley Carter (United States) Ena Shibahara	5–7, 2–6
Loss	2–4	Jul 2019	Berkeley Tennis Challenge, US	W60	Hard	(United Kingdom) Katie Swan	(United States) Madison Brengle (United States) Sachia Vickery	3–6, 5–7
Loss	2–5	Oct 2020	Tennis Classic of Macon, US	W80	Hard	(United States) Jamie Loeb	(Poland) Magdalena Fręch (Poland) Katarzyna Kawa	5–7, 1–6
Win	3–5	Jan 2023	Vero Beach Open, US	W60	Clay	(United States) Makenna Jones	(United States) Quinn Gleason (France) Elixane Lechemia	4–6, 6–3, [10–3]
Win	4–5	Mar 2023	Arcadia Pro Open, US	W60	Hard	(United States) Christina Rosca	(Japan) Rina Saigo (Japan) Yukina Saigo	6–1, 6–1
Loss	4–6	Mar 2023	ITF Boca Raton, US	W25	Hard	(United States) Makenna Jones	(United States) Hailey Baptiste (United States) Whitney Osuigwe	2–6, 2–6
