= 2012 Boyd Tinsley Women's Clay Court Classic – Singles =

Singles
- 2012 Boyd Tinsley Women's Clay Court Classic

Final
- Champion: (United States) Melanie Oudin
- Runner-up: (United States) Irina Falconi
- Score: 7–6^{(7–0)}, 3–6, 6–1

Events
Singles	Doubles
← 2011 ·	Boyd Tinsley Women's Clay Court Classic	· 2013 →

Stéphanie Dubois was the defending champion, but lost to Julia Cohen in the first round.

Melanie Oudin won the title, defeating Irina Falconi in the final, 7–6^{(7–0)}, 3–6, 6–1.

== Seeds ==
1. (Canada) Stéphanie Dubois (first round)
2. (United States) Irina Falconi (final)
3. (Russia) Alla Kudryavtseva (first round)
4. (United States) Alison Riske (second round)
5. (Australia) Olivia Rogowska (first round)
6. (Japan) Erika Sema (first round)
7. (United States) Jill Craybas (second round)
8. (Portugal) Michelle Larcher de Brito (quarterfinals)

== Main draw ==
=== Key ===
- Q = Qualifier
- WC = Wild card
- LL = Lucky loser
- Alt = Alternate
- SE = Special exempt
- PR = Protected ranking
- ITF = ITF entry
- JE = Junior exempt
- w/o = Walkover
- r = Retired
- d = Defaulted
- SR = Special ranking

=== Finals ===
Semifinals
(United States) Julia Cohen	2	4
WC	(United States) Melanie Oudin	6	6
(United States) Coco Vandeweghe	7	5	2
2	(United States) Irina Falconi	5	7	6

Final
WC	(United States) Melanie Oudin	7^{7}	3	6
2	(United States) Irina Falconi	6^{0}	6	1

=== Top half ===
First round
1	(Canada) S Dubois	4	2
(United States) J Cohen	6	6
(Australia) S Jones	6	1	2
(United States) L Davis	2	6	6
WC	(United States) L Hardenbergh	6	6
LL	(Australia) J Konta	4	3
(United States) Chi Scholl	1	6^{3}
8	(Portugal) M Larcher de Brito	6	7^{7}
3	(Russia) A Kudryavtseva	3	0^{r}
WC	(United States) M Oudin	6	3
(Canada) S Fichman	3	2
(Italy) C Giorgi	6	6
(United States) J Boserup	5	2
(South Africa) C Simmonds	7	6
LL	(Israel) J Glushko	6	4	7^{7}
6	(Japan) E Sema	1	6	6^{4}

Second round
(United States) J Cohen	6	7^{7}
(United States) L Davis	4	6^{4}
WC	(United States) L Hardenbergh	6	1	2
8	(Portugal) M Larcher de Brito	1	6	6
WC	(United States) M Oudin	6	6
(Italy) C Giorgi	4	4
(South Africa) C Simmonds	6	2	7^{7}
LL	(Israel) J Glushko	1	6	6^{2}

Quarterfinals
(United States) J Cohen	7	6
8	(Portugal) M Larcher de Brito	5	4
WC	(United States) M Oudin	2	6	6
(South Africa) C Simmonds	6	3	3

Semifinals
(United States) J Cohen	2	4
WC	(United States) M Oudin	6	6

=== Bottom half ===
First round
5	(Australia) O Rogowska	6^{5}	7^{9}	4
Q	(United States) A Kiick	7^{7}	6^{7}	6
WC	(United States) M Sanchez	6	6
Q	(United States) Cha Scholl	2	1
(United States) C Vandeweghe	6	6
(Australia) I Holland	0	2
(United States) A Glatch	4	2
4	(United States) A Riske	6	6
7	(United States) J Craybas	7	6
Q	(Brazil) R Vaisemberg	5	3
(United States) M Brengle	4	6	4
Q	(United States) G Brodsky	6	1	6
(United States) M Keys	6	5	1
WC	(United States) S Rogers	2	7	6
LL	(France) J Coin	3	2
2	(United States) I Falconi	6	6

Second round
Q	(United States) A Kiick	2	0
WC	(United States) M Sanchez	6	6
(United States) C Vandeweghe	6	7
4	(United States) A Riske	2	5
7	(United States) J Craybas	4	1
Q	(United States) G Brodsky	6	6
WC	(United States) S Rogers	1	4
2	(United States) I Falconi	6	6

Quarterfinals
WC	(United States) M Sanchez	4	6	1
(United States) C Vandeweghe	6	1	6
Q	(United States) G Brodsky	4	1
2	(United States) I Falconi	6	6

Semifinals
(United States) C Vandeweghe	7	5	2
2	(United States) I Falconi	5	7	6
