= 2014 Boyd Tinsley Women's Clay Court Classic – Doubles =

Doubles
- 2014 Boyd Tinsley Women's Clay Court Classic

Final
- Champions: (United States) Asia Muhammad (United States) Taylor Townsend
- Runners-up: (United States) Irina Falconi (United States) Maria Sanchez
- Score: 6–3, 6–1

Events
Singles	Doubles
← 2013 ·	Boyd Tinsley Women's Clay Court Classic	· 2015 →

Nicola Slater and Coco Vandeweghe were the defending champions, having won the event in 2013, but Vandeweghe chose not to participate. Slater partnered up with Julia Cohen, but they lost in the first round.

Asia Muhammad and Taylor Townsend won the tournament, defeating Irina Falconi and Maria Sanchez in the final, 6–3, 6–1.

== Seeds ==
1. (United States) Irina Falconi / (United States) Maria Sanchez (final)
2. (United States) Asia Muhammad / (United States) Taylor Townsend (champions)
3. (Paraguay) Verónica Cepede Royg / (Argentina) Florencia Molinero (semifinals; withdrew)
4. (United States) Jacqueline Cako / (United States) Keri Wong (first round)

== Draw ==
=== Key ===
- Q = Qualifier
- WC = Wild card
- LL = Lucky loser
- Alt = Alternate
- SE = Special exempt
- PR = Protected ranking
- ITF = ITF entry
- JE = Junior exempt
- w/o = Walkover
- r = Retired
- d = Defaulted
- SR = Special ranking

First round
1	(United States) I Falconi (United States) M Sanchez	6	6
(Bulgaria) D Evtimova (Bulgaria) E Kostova	3	4
(United States) J Abaza (Serbia) T Čurović	4	6	[6]
(Canada) F Abanda (United States) C-Y Hsu	6	4	[10]
3	(Paraguay) V Cepede Royg (Argentina) F Molinero	6	5	[10]
(United States) L Chirico (United States) S Marand	3	7	[4]
(Estonia) A Kontaveit (Belarus) I Kremen	6	6
(United States) E Harman (Japan) M Hibi	1	3
(United States) S Crawford (United States) M Oudin	6	6
(Australia) S Peers (United States) A Weinhold	3	3
(United States) S Rogers (Australia) O Rogowska	5	6	[10]
4	(United States) J Cako (United States) K Wong	7	3	[5]
(United States) J Boserup (United States) A Mueller	6^{4}	6	[7]
(Canada) H El Tabakh (United States) A Kiick	7^{7}	4	[10]
(United States) J Cohen (United Kingdom) N Slater	3	6^{5}
2	(United States) A Muhammad (United States) T Townsend	6	7^{7}

Quarterfinals
1	(United States) I Falconi (United States) M Sanchez	6	6
(Canada) F Abanda (United States) C-Y Hsu	3	3
3	(Paraguay) V Cepede Royg (Argentina) F Molinero	w/o
(Estonia) A Kontaveit (Belarus) I Kremen
(United States) S Crawford (United States) M Oudin
(United States) S Rogers (Australia) O Rogowska	w/o
(Canada) H El Tabakh (United States) A Kiick	5	2
2	(United States) A Muhammad (United States) T Townsend	7	6

Semifinals
1	(United States) I Falconi (United States) M Sanchez	w/o
3	(Paraguay) V Cepede Royg (Argentina) F Molinero
(United States) S Rogers (Australia) O Rogowska	1	2
2	(United States) A Muhammad (United States) T Townsend	6	6

Final
1	(United States) I Falconi (United States) M Sanchez	3	1
2	(United States) A Muhammad (United States) T Townsend	6	6
