= 2012 ITF Women's Circuit – Yakima =

- Date: July 9–15
- Edition: 1st
- Surface: Hard (outdoor)
- Location: Yakima, Washington, United States

Champions

Singles
- (United States) Shelby Rogers

Doubles
- (United States) Samantha Crawford / (United States) Madison Keys
ITF Women's Circuit – Yakima	· 2013 →

The 2012 ITF Women's Circuit – Yakima was a professional tennis tournament played on outdoor hard courts. It was the first edition of the tournament and was part of the 2012 ITF Women's Circuit. It took place in Yakima, Washington, United States, on July 9–15, 2012.

== WTA entrants ==
=== Seeds ===
Country	Player	Rank^{1}	Seed
FRA	Irena Pavlovic	152	1
USA	Madison Brengle	167	2
FRA	Victoria Larrière	182	3
USA	Madison Keys	211	4
AUS	Monique Adamczak	221	5
FRA	Julie Coin	244	6
JPN	Aiko Nakamura	248	7
CHN	Duan Yingying	257	8

- Rankings as of June 25, 2012

=== Other entrants ===
The following players received wildcards into the singles main draw:

- (United States) Lauren Albanese
- (United States) Beatrice Capra
- (United States) Diana Ospina

The following players received entry from the qualifying draw:

- (United States) Jacqueline Cako
- (Japan) Mayo Hibi
- (Canada) Jana Nejedly
- (United States) Natalie Pluskota

The following players received entry by a Special Ranking:

- (China) Zhou Yimiao

== Champions ==
=== Singles ===
- (United States) Shelby Rogers def. (United States) Samantha Crawford 6–4, 6–7^{(3–7)}, 6–3

=== Doubles ===
- (United States) Samantha Crawford / (United States) Madison Keys def. (China) Xu Yifan / (China) Zhou Yimiao 6–3, 2–6, [12–10]
