= 2012 Boyd Tinsley Women's Clay Court Classic =

Tennis tournament

- Date: 23–29 April
- Edition: 10th
- Surface: Clay
- Location: Charlottesville, Virginia, United States

Champions

Singles
- (United States) Melanie Oudin

Doubles
- (United States) Maria Sanchez / (United States) Yasmin Schnack
← 2011 ·	Boyd Tinsley Women's Clay Court Classic	· 2013 →

The 2012 Boyd Tinsley Women's Clay Court Classic was a professional tennis tournament played on clay courts. It was the tenth edition of the tournament which was part of the 2012 ITF Women's Circuit. It took place in Charlottesville, Virginia, United States between 23 and 29 April 2012.

== WTA entrants ==
=== Seeds ===
Country	Player	Rank^{1}	Seed
CAN	Stéphanie Dubois	92	1
USA	Irina Falconi	105	2
RUS	Alla Kudryavtseva	116	3
USA	Alison Riske	122	4
AUS	Olivia Rogowska	123	5
JPN	Erika Sema	134	6
USA	Jill Craybas	135	7
POR	Michelle Larcher de Brito	146	8

- ^{1} Rankings are as of April 16, 2012.

=== Other entrants ===
The following players received wildcards into the singles main draw:

- (United States) Lindsey Hardenbergh
- (United States) Melanie Oudin
- (United States) Shelby Rogers
- (United States) Maria Sanchez

The following players received entry from the qualifying draw:

- (United States) Gail Brodsky
- (United States) Alexandra Kiick
- (United States) Chalena Scholl
- (Brazil) Roxane Vaisemberg

The following players received entry by a lucky loser spot:

- (France) Julie Coin
- (Israel) Julia Glushko
- (Australia) Johanna Konta

== Champions ==
=== Singles ===
- (United States) Melanie Oudin def. (United States) Irina Falconi, 7–6^{(7–0)}, 3–6, 6–1

=== Doubles ===
- (United States) Maria Sanchez / (United States) Yasmin Schnack def. (Russia) Elena Bovina / (Israel) Julia Glushko, 6–2, 6–2
