= 2013 Boyd Tinsley Women's Clay Court Classic =

- Date: April 22–28
- Edition: 12th
- Location: Charlottesville, Virginia, United States

Champions

Singles
- (United States) Shelby Rogers

Doubles
- (United Kingdom) Nicola Slater / (United States) Coco Vandeweghe
← 2012 ·	Boyd Tinsley Women's Clay Court Classic	· 2014 →

The 2013 Boyd Tinsley Women's Clay Court Classic was a professional tennis tournament played on outdoor clay courts. It was the twelfth edition of the tournament which was part of the 2013 ITF Women's Circuit, offering a total of $50,000 in prize money. It took place in Charlottesville, Virginia, United States, on April 22–28, 2013.

== WTA entrants ==
=== Seeds ===
Country	Player	Rank^{1}	Seed
USA	Coco Vandeweghe	91	1
GER	Tatjana Maria	109	2
USA	Maria Sanchez	112	3
USA	Alexa Glatch	116	4
USA	Julia Cohen	124	5
USA	Jessica Pegula	134	6
CHN	Zhang Shuai	135	7
USA	Irina Falconi	151	8

- ^{1} Rankings as of April 15, 2013

=== Other entrants ===
The following players received wildcards into the singles main draw:

- (United States) Lindsey Hardenbergh
- (United States) Allie Kiick
- (United States) Ashley Weinhold
- (United States) Allie Will

The following players received entry from the qualifying draw:

- (United States) Jan Abaza
- (United States) Sanaz Marand
- (Slovenia) Petra Rampre
- (United States) Chalena Scholl

== Champions ==
=== Singles ===
- (United States) Shelby Rogers def. (United States) Allie Kiick 6–3, 7–5

=== Doubles ===
- (United Kingdom) Nicola Slater / (United States) Coco Vandeweghe def. (United States) Nicole Gibbs / (United States) Shelby Rogers 6–3, 7–6^{(7–4)}
