= 2013 Yakima Regional Hospital Challenger =

- Date: July 8–14
- Edition: 2nd
- Draw: 32S / 16D
- Prize money: $50,000
- Surface: Hard
- Location: Yakima, United States

Champions

Singles
- (United States) Nicole Gibbs

Doubles
- (United States) Jan Abaza / (United States) Allie Will
← 2012 ·	Yakima Regional Hospital Challenger	· 2014 →

The 2013 Yakima Regional Hospital Challenger was a professional tennis tournament played on outdoor hard courts. It was the second edition of the tournament which was part of the 2013 ITF Women's Circuit, offering a total of $50,000 in prize money. It took place in Yakima, Washington, United States, on July 8–14, 2013.

== WTA entrants ==
=== Seeds ===
Country	Player	Rank^{1}	Seed
CAN	Sharon Fichman	105	1
USA	Maria Sanchez	114	2
ISR	Julia Glushko	129	3
JPN	Kurumi Nara	132	4
USA	Shelby Rogers	134	5
AUS	Olivia Rogowska	144	6
RSA	Chanel Simmonds	164	7
USA	Nicole Gibbs	172	8

- ^{1} Rankings as of June 24, 2013

=== Other entrants ===
The following players received wildcards into the singles main draw:

- (United States) Robin Anderson
- (United States) Jacqueline Cako
- (United States) Lauren Embree
- (United States) Mary Weatherholt

The following players received entry from the qualifying draw:

- (United States) Julia Boserup
- (United States) Asia Muhammad
- (United States) Alexandra Stevenson
- (United States) Ashley Weinhold

The following players received entry by a Protected Ranking:

- (Croatia) Ivana Lisjak

== Champions ==
=== Women's singles ===
- (United States) Nicole Gibbs def. (Croatia) Ivana Lisjak 6–1, 6–4

=== Women's doubles ===
- (United States) Jan Abaza / (United States) Allie Will def. (United Kingdom) Naomi Broady / (United States) Irina Falconi 7–5, 3–6, [10–3]
