= 2013 Yakima Regional Hospital Challenger – Singles =

Singles
- 2013 Yakima Regional Hospital Challenger

Final
- Champion: (United States) Nicole Gibbs
- Runner-up: (Croatia) Ivana Lisjak
- Score: 6–1, 6–4

Events
Singles	Doubles
← 2012 ·	Yakima Regional Hospital Challenger	· 2014 →

Shelby Rogers was the defending champion, having won the event in 2012, but lost to Storm Sanders in the quarterfinals.

Nicole Gibbs won the title, defeating Ivana Lisjak in the final, 6–1, 6–4.

== Seeds ==
1. (Canada) Sharon Fichman (second round)
2. (United States) Maria Sanchez (first round)
3. (Israel) Julia Glushko (semifinals)
4. (Japan) ~~Kurumi Nara~~ (withdrew)
5. (United States) Shelby Rogers (quarterfinals)
6. (Australia) Olivia Rogowska (first round)
7. (South Africa) Chanel Simmonds (quarterfinals)
8. (United States) Nicole Gibbs (champion)

== Main draw ==
=== Key ===
- Q = Qualifier
- WC = Wild card
- LL = Lucky loser
- Alt = Alternate
- SE = Special exempt
- PR = Protected ranking
- ITF = ITF entry
- JE = Junior exempt
- w/o = Walkover
- r = Retired
- d = Defaulted
- SR = Special ranking

=== Finals ===
Semifinals
PR	(Croatia) Ivana Lisjak	6	3	6
(Australia) Storm Sanders	2	6	2
3	(Israel) Julia Glushko	6	2	1
8	(United States) Nicole Gibbs	4	6	6

Final
PR	(Croatia) Ivana Lisjak	1	4
8	(United States) Nicole Gibbs	6	6

=== Top half ===
First round
1	(Canada) S Fichman	6	4	6
(France) J Coin	2	6	4
PR	(Croatia) I Lisjak	6	7^{7}
(United States) I Falconi	4	6^{2}
(Canada) H El Tabakh	4	6	3
(United States) S Marand	6	0	6
(Slovenia) P Rampre	2	1
7	(South Africa) C Simmonds	6	6
LL	(United States) E Lumpkin	0	0
(Japan) M Hibi	6	6
(Australia) S Sanders	7	6
(Japan) A Omae	5	1
WC	(United States) R Anderson	3	2
(Canada) G Dabrowski	6	6
Q	(United States) J Boserup	5	6^{3}
5	(United States) S Rogers	7	7^{7}

Second round
1	(Canada) S Fichman	5	1
PR	(Croatia) I Lisjak	7	6
(United States) S Marand	1	1
7	(South Africa) C Simmonds	6	6
(Japan) M Hibi	6	1	2
(Australia) S Sanders	3	6	6
(Canada) G Dabrowski	1	3
5	(United States) S Rogers	6	6

Quarterfinals
PR	(Croatia) I Lisjak	6	6
7	(South Africa) C Simmonds	4	4
(Australia) S Sanders	6	6^{6}	6
5	(United States) S Rogers	1	7^{8}	2

Semifinals
PR	(Croatia) I Lisjak	6	3	6
(Australia) S Sanders	2	6	2

=== Bottom half ===
First round
6	(Australia) O Rogowska	6	6^{7}	1
WC	(United States) J Cako	3	7^{9}	6
(Japan) M Eguchi	4	2
Q	(United States) A Weinhold	6	6
(South Korea) S-r Lee	7	6^{3}	0
(United States) A Kiick	5	7^{7}	6
(Croatia) J Pandžić	3	4
3	(Israel) J Glushko	6	6
8	(United States) N Gibbs	3	7^{7}	0
Q	(United States) A Stevenson	6	6^{5}	0^{r}
WC	(United States) L Embree	4	6	2
Q	(United States) A Muhammed	6	3	6
(United States) S Vickery	6	6
WC	(United States) M Weatherholt	3	3
(Australia) S Jones	6	6
2	(United States) M Sanchez	4	3

Second round
WC	(United States) J Cako	1	6	3
Q	(United States) A Weinhold	6	4	6
(United States) A Kiick	1	2
3	(Israel) J Glushko	6	6
8	(United States) N Gibbs	6	6
Q	(United States) A Muhammed	0	1
(United States) S Vickery	3	7	6
(Australia) S Jones	6	5	3

Quarterfinals
Q	(United States) A Weinhold	3	2
3	(Israel) J Glushko	6	6
8	(United States) N Gibbs	6	6
(United States) S Vickery	3	2

Semifinals
3	(Israel) J Glushko	6	2	1
8	(United States) N Gibbs	4	6	6
