= 2013 Yakima Regional Hospital Challenger – Doubles =

Doubles
- 2013 Yakima Regional Hospital Challenger

Final
- Champions: (United States) Jan Abaza (United States) Allie Will
- Runners-up: (United Kingdom) Naomi Broady (United States) Irina Falconi
- Score: 7–5, 3–6, [10–3]

Events
Singles	Doubles
← 2012 ·	Yakima Regional Hospital Challenger	· 2014 →

Samantha Crawford and Madison Keys were the defending champions, having won the event in 2012, but both players chose not to defend their title. Jan Abaza and Allie Will won the title, defeating Naomi Broady and Irina Falconi in the final, 7–5, 3–6, [10–3].

== Seeds ==
1. (United States) Asia Muhammad / (United States) Maria Sanchez (semifinals)
2. (Canada) Gabriela Dabrowski / (Canada) Sharon Fichman (first round)
3. (Israel) Julia Glushko / (Australia) Olivia Rogowska (quarterfinals)
4. (United States) Jacqueline Cako / (United States) Natalie Pluskota (first round)

== Draw ==
=== Key ===
- Q = Qualifier
- WC = Wild card
- LL = Lucky loser
- Alt = Alternate
- SE = Special exempt
- PR = Protected ranking
- ITF = ITF entry
- JE = Junior exempt
- w/o = Walkover
- r = Retired
- d = Defaulted
- SR = Special ranking

First round
1	(United States) A Muhammad (United States) M Sanchez	6	2	[10]
(United States) A Bhargava (United States) N Melichar	2	6	[7]
(Russia) A Gabueva (Slovakia) L Wienerová	6	7^{7}
WC	(Japan) M Hibi (United States) D Ospina	4	6^{3}
4	(United States) J Cako (United States) N Pluskota	4	6	[11]
(France) J Coin (United States) K Wong	6	3	[13]
(United Kingdom) N Broady (United States) I Falconi	6	6
(Japan) A Omae (South Africa) C Simmonds	2	3
(Australia) S Peers (United Kingdom) E Webley-Smith	3	3
(Thailand) N Lertpitaksinchai (Thailand) P Plipuech	6	6
(United States) S Marand (United States) A Weinhold	3	2
3	(Israel) J Glushko (Australia) O Rogowska	6	6
(United States) J Elie (United States) S Rogers	1	4
(United States) J Abaza (United States) A Will	6	6
WC	(United States) R Anderson (United States) N Gibbs	6	7
2	(Canada) G Dabrowski (Canada) S Fichman	2	5

Quarterfinals
1	(United States) A Muhammad (United States) M Sanchez	6	6
(Russia) A Gabueva (Slovakia) L Wienerová	4	4
(France) J Coin (United States) K Wong	4	4
(United Kingdom) N Broady (United States) I Falconi	6	6
(Thailand) N Lertpitaksinchai (Thailand) P Plipuech	6	6
3	(Israel) J Glushko (Australia) O Rogowska	1	2
(United States) J Abaza (United States) A Will	7	6^{5}	[10]
WC	(United States) R Anderson (United States) N Gibbs	5	7^{7}	[5]

Semifinals
1	(United States) A Muhammad (United States) M Sanchez	6	3	[8]
(United Kingdom) N Broady (United States) I Falconi	3	6	[10]
(Thailand) N Lertpitaksinchai (Thailand) P Plipuech	4	4
(United States) J Abaza (United States) A Will	6	6

Final
(United Kingdom) N Broady (United States) I Falconi	5	6	[3]
(United States) J Abaza (United States) A Will	7	3	[10]
