= 2014 Boyd Tinsley Women's Clay Court Classic – Singles =

Singles
- 2014 Boyd Tinsley Women's Clay Court Classic

Final
- Champion: (United States) Taylor Townsend
- Runner-up: (Paraguay) Montserrat González
- Score: 6–2, 6–3

Events
Singles	Doubles
← 2013 ·	Boyd Tinsley Women's Clay Court Classic	· 2015 →

Shelby Rogers was the defending champion, but lost in the first round.

Wildcard Taylor Townsend won the tournament, defeating qualifier Montserrat González in the final, 6–2, 6–3.

== Seeds ==
1. (United States) Shelby Rogers (first round)
2. (Australia) Olivia Rogowska (first round)
3. (United States) Melanie Oudin (first round)
4. (United States) Irina Falconi (first round)
5. (Paraguay) Verónica Cepede Royg (first round)
6. (United States) Victoria Duval (quarterfinals; retired)
7. (Kazakhstan) Yulia Putintseva (second round)
8. (United States) Grace Min (semifinals)

== Main draw ==
=== Key ===
- Q = Qualifier
- WC = Wild card
- LL = Lucky loser
- Alt = Alternate
- SE = Special exempt
- PR = Protected ranking
- ITF = ITF entry
- JE = Junior exempt
- w/o = Walkover
- r = Retired
- d = Defaulted
- SR = Special ranking

=== Finals ===
Semifinals
Q	(Paraguay) Montserrat González	3	6	6
8	(United States) Grace Min	6	1	4
WC	(United States) Taylor Townsend	6	6
WC	(United States) Sanaz Marand	4	1

Final
Q	(Paraguay) Montserrat González	2	3
WC	(United States) Taylor Townsend	6	6

=== Top half ===
First round
1	(United States) S Rogers	4	4
Q	(Norway) U Eikeri	6	6
(Argentina) F Molinero	6^{1}	3
Q	(Canada) F Abanda	7^{7}	6
(United States) J Cohen	4	2
Q	(Paraguay) M González	6	6
Q	(Ukraine) S Kovalets	6^{5}	7^{11}	6
5	(Paraguay) V Cepede Royg	7^{7}	6^{9}	4
3	(United States) M Oudin	3	6^{4}
(Estonia) A Kontaveit	6	7^{7}
(United States) A Kiick	3	4
(United States) N Gibbs	6	6
(Bulgaria) E Kostova	6	6
(United States) M Sanchez	2	1
(Slovenia) N Kolar	6	2	2
8	(United States) G Min	4	6	6

Second round
Q	(Norway) U Eikeri	6	6^{2}	2
Q	(Canada) F Abanda	4	7^{7}	6
Q	(Paraguay) M González	6	7
Q	(Ukraine) S Kovalets	2	5
(Estonia) A Kontaveit	7^{7}	5	0^{r}
(United States) N Gibbs	6^{3}	7	0
(Bulgaria) E Kostova	6^{1}	2
8	(United States) G Min	7^{7}	6

Quarterfinals
Q	(Canada) F Abanda	1	7	4
Q	(Paraguay) M González	6	5	6
(United States) N Gibbs	6	3	2
8	(United States) G Min	1	6	6

Semifinals
Q	(Paraguay) M González	3	6	6
8	(United States) G Min	6	1	4

=== Bottom half ===
First round
7	(Kazakhstan) Y Putintseva	6	6
(Slovenia) P Rampre	1	4
WC	(United States) S Crawford	4	6	2
(Kazakhstan) S Karatantcheva	6	3	6
(Australia) An Rodionova	7	7
WC	(United States) J Boserup	5	5
WC	(United States) T Townsend	6	7^{9}
4	(United States) I Falconi	4	6^{7}
6	(United States) V Duval	6	6
(Canada) H El Tabakh	3	1
(Belarus) I Kremen	7	6
(United States) C-Y Hsu	5	1
(Japan) M Hibi	3	5
WC	(United States) S Marand	6	7
(Austria) M Klaffner	6	1	6
2	(Australia) O Rogowska	4	6	4

Second round
7	(Kazakhstan) Y Putintseva	4	4
(Kazakhstan) S Karatantcheva	6	6
(Australia) An Rodionova	3	1
WC	(United States) T Townsend	6	6
6	(United States) V Duval	6	6
(Belarus) I Kremen	0	2
WC	(United States) S Marand	6	2	6
(Austria) M Klaffner	2	6	4

Quarterfinals
(Kazakhstan) S Karatantcheva	4	7	0
WC	(United States) T Townsend	6	5	6
6	(United States) V Duval	5^{r}
WC	(United States) S Marand	5

Semifinals
WC	(United States) T Townsend	6	6
WC	(United States) S Marand	4	1
