= 2012 FSP Gold River Women's Challenger – Doubles =

Doubles
- 2012 FSP Gold River Women's Challenger

Final
- Champions: (United States) Asia Muhammed (United States) Yasmin Schnack
- Runners-up: (United States) Kaitlyn Christian (United States) Maria Sanchez
- Score: 6–3, 7–6^{(7–4)}

Events
Singles	Doubles
← 2011 ·	FSP Gold River Women's Challenger	· 2013 →

This was the first edition of the tournament.

Asia Muhammed and Yasmin Schnack won the title, defeating Kaitlyn Christian and Maria Sanchez in the final, 6–3, 7–6^{(7–4)}.

== Seeds ==
1. (United States) Jessica Pegula / (Canada) Marie-Ève Pelletier (quarterfinals)
2. (United States) Asia Muhammed / (United States) Yasmin Schnack (champions)
3. (Brazil) Maria Fernanda Alves / (Russia) Valeria Solovieva (semifinals)
4. (Russia) Elena Bovina / (Venezuela) Gabriela Paz (quarterfinals)

== Draw ==
=== Key ===
- Q = Qualifier
- WC = Wild card
- LL = Lucky loser
- Alt = Alternate
- SE = Special exempt
- PR = Protected ranking
- ITF = ITF entry
- JE = Junior exempt
- w/o = Walkover
- r = Retired
- d = Defaulted
- SR = Special ranking

=== Draw ===
First round
1	(United States) J Pegula (Canada) M-È Pelletier	6	6
(United States) J Elie (Germany) K Grajdek	2	4
(United States) S Kalhorn (United States) L Megale	5	2
(United States) L Litvak (Venezuela) A Pérez	7	6
4	(Russia) E Bovina (Venezuela) G Paz	6	6
(France) C Cattaneo (United States) N Robinson	2	0
(United States) K Christian (United States) M Sanchez	6	5	[10]
(Bulgaria) S Krivencheva (United States) D Ospina	1	7	[7]
(United States) C-y Hsu (United States) A Weinhold	6	6
(United States) W Jones (United States) E Lumpkin	1	2
(United States) G Andrews (United States) S Crawford	3	4
3	(Brazil) MF Alves (Russia) V Solovieva	6	6
WC	(Sweden) I Kling (United States) K Wilson	5	6	[7]
(United States) Y Allen (United States) E Clark	7	2	[10]
(United States) N Echeverria Alam (United States) E Ferris	4	4
2	(United States) A Muhammed (United States) Y Schnack	6	6

Quarterfinals
1	(United States) J Pegula (Canada) M-È Pelletier	3	6^{4}
(United States) L Litvak (Venezuela) A Pérez	6	7^{7}
4	(Russia) E Bovina (Venezuela) G Paz	2	0
(United States) K Christian (United States) M Sanchez	6	6
(United States) C-y Hsu (United States) A Weinhold	6	3	[6]
3	(Brazil) MF Alves (Russia) V Solovieva	1	6	[10]
(United States) Y Allen (United States) E Clark	3	4
2	(United States) A Muhammed (United States) Y Schnack	6	6

Semifinals
(United States) L Litvak (Venezuela) A Pérez	4	4
(United States) K Christian (United States) M Sanchez	6	6
3	(Brazil) MF Alves (Russia) V Solovieva	3	6^{3}
2	(United States) A Muhammed (United States) Y Schnack	6	7^{7}

Finals
(United States) K Christian (United States) M Sanchez	3	6^{4}
2	(United States) A Muhammed (United States) Y Schnack	6	7^{7}
