= 2015 Boyd Tinsley Women's Clay Court Classic – Doubles =

Doubles
- 2015 Boyd Tinsley Women's Clay Court Classic

Final
- Champions: (Canada) Françoise Abanda (United States) Maria Sanchez
- Runners-up: (Ukraine) Olga Ianchuk (Russia) Irina Khromacheva
- Score: 6–1, 6–3

Events
Singles	Doubles
← 2014 ·	Boyd Tinsley Women's Clay Court Classic	· 2016 →

Asia Muhammad and Taylor Townsend were the defending champions, but Townsend chose not to participate whilst Muhammad chose to participate at the 2015 Prague Open instead.

Françoise Abanda and Maria Sanchez won the title, defeating Olga Ianchuk and Irina Khromacheva in the final, 6–1, 6–3.

== Seeds ==
1. (Brazil) Paula Cristina Gonçalves / (Argentina) Florencia Molinero (quarterfinals)
2. (Chinese Taipei) Hsu Chieh-yu / (Poland) Justyna Jegiołka (semifinals)
3. (Ukraine) Olga Ianchuk / (Russia) Irina Khromacheva (final)
4. (United States) Ashley Weinhold / (United States) Caitlin Whoriskey (first round)

== Draw ==
=== Key ===
- Q = Qualifier
- WC = Wild card
- LL = Lucky loser
- Alt = Alternate
- SE = Special exempt
- PR = Protected ranking
- ITF = ITF entry
- JE = Junior exempt
- w/o = Walkover
- r = Retired
- d = Defaulted
- SR = Special ranking

First round
1	(Brazil) PC Gonçalves (Argentina) F Molinero	6	6
(Russia) A Gabueva (Ukraine) E Ianchuk	2	2
(United States) J Boserup (Argentina) P Ormaechea	3	7	[7]
(Canada) F Abanda (United States) M Sanchez	6	5	[10]
4	(United States) A Weinhold (United States) C Whoriskey	3	6^{5}
(United States) S Crawford (United States) E Harman	6	7^{7}
(Brazil) L Pigossi (Australia) S Sanders	3	4
(Brazil) G Cé (Australia) J Moore	6	6
(United States) J Elie (United States) A Kiick	6^{7}	3
(United States) J Cako (Serbia) V Lukić	7^{9}	6
(United States) S Chang (Romania) PM Țig	7^{7}	2	[1]
3	(Ukraine) O Ianchuk (Russia) I Khromacheva	6^{5}	6	[10]
(United States) A Mueller (United States) K Wong	3	6^{5}
(United States) L Chirico (United States) G Min	6	7^{7}
WC	(United States) A Stevenson (United States) R Valdes	2	3
2	(Chinese Taipei) C-y Hsu (Poland) J Jegiołka	6	6

Quarterfinals
1	(Brazil) PC Gonçalves (Argentina) F Molinero	3	2
(Canada) F Abanda (United States) M Sanchez	6	6
(United States) S Crawford (United States) E Harman	6	5	[7]
(Brazil) G Cé (Australia) J Moore	4	7	[10]
(United States) J Cako (Serbia) V Lukić	4	4
3	(Ukraine) O Ianchuk (Russia) I Khromacheva	6	6
(United States) L Chirico (United States) G Min	2	4
2	(Chinese Taipei) C-y Hsu (Poland) J Jegiołka	6	6

Semifinals
(Canada) F Abanda (United States) M Sanchez	5	6	[10]
(Brazil) G Cé (Australia) J Moore	7	3	[5]
3	(Ukraine) O Ianchuk (Russia) I Khromacheva	6	6
2	(Chinese Taipei) C-y Hsu (Poland) J Jegiołka	3	1

Final
(Canada) F Abanda (United States) M Sanchez	6	6
3	(Ukraine) O Ianchuk (Russia) I Khromacheva	1	3
