= 2015 Boyd Tinsley Women's Clay Court Classic =

- Date: 27 April–3 May
- Edition: 14th
- Category: ITF Women's Circuit
- Prize money: $50,000
- Surface: Clay
- Location: Charlottesville, Virginia, United States

Champions

Singles
- (United States) Allie Kiick

Doubles
- (Canada) Françoise Abanda / (United States) Maria Sanchez
← 2014 ·	Boyd Tinsley Women's Clay Court Classic	· 2016 →

The 2015 Boyd Tinsley Women's Clay Court Classic was a professional tennis tournament played on outdoor clay courts. It was the fourteenth edition of the tournament and part of the 2015 ITF Women's Circuit, offering a total of $50,000 in prize money. It took place in Charlottesville, Virginia, United States, on 27 April–3 May 2015.

== Singles main draw entrants ==
=== Seeds ===
Country	Player	Rank^{1}	Seed
USA	Sachia Vickery	126	1
USA	Grace Min	128	2
POR	Michelle Larcher de Brito	133	3
~~USA~~	~~Anna Tatishvili~~	~~134~~	~~4~~
USA	Louisa Chirico	140	5
ARG	Paula Ormaechea	156	6
ROU	Patricia Maria Țig	178	7
USA	Maria Sanchez	183	8
SRB	Jovana Jakšić	216	9

- ^{1} Rankings as of 20 April 2015

=== Other entrants ===
The following players received wildcards into the singles main draw:

- (United States) Usue Maitaine Arconada
- (United States) Tornado Alicia Black
- (United States) Julia Elbaba
- (United States) Rianna Valdes

The following players received entry from the qualifying draw:

- (United States) Nicole Frenkel
- (Ukraine) Elizaveta Ianchuk
- (Serbia) Vojislava Lukić
- (Australia) Storm Sanders

The following player received entry by a lucky loser:

- (Russia) Angelina Gabueva

The following player received entry from a protected ranking:

- (United States) Jessica Pegula

The following player received entry by a special exempt:

- (United States) Katerina Stewart

== Champions ==
=== Singles ===
- (United States) Allie Kiick def. (United States) Katerina Stewart, 7–5, 6–7^{(3–7)}, 7–5

=== Doubles ===
- (Canada) Françoise Abanda / (United States) Maria Sanchez def. (Ukraine) Olga Ianchuk / (Russia) Irina Khromacheva, 6–1, 6–3
