= 2012 Boyd Tinsley Women's Clay Court Classic – Doubles =

Doubles
- 2012 Boyd Tinsley Women's Clay Court Classic

Final
- Champions: (United States) Maria Sanchez (United States) Yasmin Schnack
- Runners-up: (Russia) Elena Bovina (Israel) Julia Glushko
- Score: 6–2, 6–2

Events
Singles	Doubles
← 2011 ·	Boyd Tinsley Women's Clay Court Classic	· 2013 →

Sharon Fichman and Marie-Ève Pelletier were the defending champions, but Pelletier chose not to participate. Fichman partnered up with Valeria Solovieva, but lost in the semifinals to Elena Bovina and Julia Glushko.

Maria Sanchez and Yasmin Schnack won the title, defeating Bovina and Glushko in the final, 6–2, 6–2.

== Seeds ==
1. (United States) Alexa Glatch / (United States) Melanie Oudin (quarterfinals)
2. (United States) Jill Craybas / (United States) Alison Riske (first round)
3. (Canada) Sharon Fichman / (Russia) Valeria Solovieva (semifinals)
4. (United States) Maria Sanchez / (United States) Yasmin Schnack (champions)

== Draw ==
=== Key ===
- Q = Qualifier
- WC = Wild card
- LL = Lucky loser
- Alt = Alternate
- SE = Special exempt
- PR = Protected ranking
- ITF = ITF entry
- JE = Junior exempt
- w/o = Walkover
- r = Retired
- d = Defaulted
- SR = Special ranking

=== Draw ===
First round
(United States) I Falconi (United States) C Vandeweghe	6^{5}	6	[10]
(Australia) I Holland (Japan) A Omae	7^{7}	3	[2]
4	(United States) M Sanchez (United States) Y Schnack	6	6
(United States) L Litvak (South Africa) C Simmonds	4	1
(United States) C Gullickson (United States) A Weinhold	4	6	[10]
(United States) M Brengle (United States) C-y Hsu	6	1	[5]
(Brazil) MF Alves (Spain) R de la Torre-Sánchez	3	1
(United States) J Boserup (United States) S Rogers	6	6
(Australia) S Peers (Australia) O Rogowska	1	3
3	(Canada) S Fichman (Russia) V Solovieva	6	6
(United States) J Cohen (United States) C Scholl	6	6
(United States) W Jones (Brazil) R Vaisemberg	1	2
(Russia) E Bovina (Israel) J Glushko	6	6
2	(United States) J Craybas (United States) A Riske	4	1

Quarterfinals
1	(United States) A Glatch (United States) M Oudin	3	6	[5]
(United States) I Falconi (United States) C Vandeweghe	6	4	[10]
4	(United States) M Sanchez (United States) Y Schnack	7^{8}	6
(United States) C Gullickson (United States) A Weinhold	6^{6}	2
(United States) J Boserup (United States) S Rogers
3	(Canada) S Fichman (Russia) V Solovieva	w/o
(United States) J Cohen (United States) C Scholl	3	2
(Russia) E Bovina (Israel) J Glushko	6	6

Semifinals
(United States) I Falconi (United States) C Vandeweghe	6^{1}	1
4	(United States) M Sanchez (United States) Y Schnack	7^{7}	6
3	(Canada) S Fichman (Russia) V Solovieva	4	4
(Russia) E Bovina (Israel) J Glushko	6	6

Finals
4	(United States) M Sanchez (United States) Y Schnack	6	6
(Russia) E Bovina (Israel) J Glushko	2	2
