= 2014 Boyd Tinsley Women's Clay Court Classic =

- Date: April 21–27
- Edition: 13th
- Category: ITF Women's Circuit
- Prize money: $50,000
- Surface: Clay
- Location: Charlottesville, Virginia, United States

Champions

Singles
- (United States) Taylor Townsend

Doubles
- (United States) Asia Muhammad / (United States) Taylor Townsend
| ← 2013 · | Boyd Tinsley Women's Clay Court Classic | · 2015 → |

The 2014 Boyd Tinsley Women's Clay Court Classic was a professional tennis tournament played on outdoor clay courts. It was the thirteenth edition of the tournament and part of the 2014 ITF Women's Circuit, offering a total of $50,000 in prize money. It took place in Charlottesville, Virginia, United States, on April 21–27, 2014.

== Singles main draw entrants ==
=== Seeds ===
| Country | Player | Rank^{1} | Seed |
|---|---|---|---|
| USA | Shelby Rogers | 111 | 1 |
| AUS | Olivia Rogowska | 131 | 2 |
| USA | Melanie Oudin | 136 | 3 |
| USA | Irina Falconi | 138 | 4 |
| PAR | Verónica Cepede Royg | 142 | 5 |
| USA | Victoria Duval | 148 | 6 |
| KAZ | Yulia Putintseva | 159 | 7 |
| USA | Grace Min | 164 | 8 |

- ^{1} Rankings as of April 14, 2014

=== Other entrants ===
The following players received wildcards into the singles main draw:

- (United States) Julia Boserup
- (United States) Samantha Crawford
- (United States) Sanaz Marand
- (United States) Taylor Townsend

The following players received entry from the qualifying draw:

- (Canada) Françoise Abanda
- (Norway) Ulrikke Eikeri
- (Paraguay) Montserrat González
- (Ukraine) Sofiya Kovalets

== Champions ==
=== Singles ===
- (United States) Taylor Townsend def. (Paraguay) Montserrat González 6–2, 6–3

=== Doubles ===
- (United States) Asia Muhammad / (United States) Taylor Townsend def. (United States) Irina Falconi / (United States) Maria Sanchez 6–3, 6–1
