= 2012 ITF Women's Circuit – Yakima – Doubles =

Yakima – Doubles
- 2012 ITF Women's Circuit – Yakima

Final
- Champions: (United States) Samantha Crawford (United States) Madison Keys
- Runners-up: (China) Xu Yifan (China) Zhou Yimiao
- Score: 6–3, 2–6, [12–10]

Events
Singles	Doubles
- ITF Women's Circuit – Yakima

This was a new event in 2012.

Samantha Crawford and Madison Keys won the title, defeating Xu Yifan and Zhou Yimiao in the final, 6–3, 2–6, [12–10].

== Seeds ==
1. (Brazil) Maria Fernanda Alves / (France) Julie Coin (first round)
2. (Australia) Bojana Bobusic / (Australia) Sally Peers (first round)
3. (Australia) Monique Adamczak / (France) Victoria Larrière (quarterfinals)
4. (United States) Madison Brengle / (Japan) Kanae Hisami (quarterfinals)

== Draw ==
Key

- Q = Qualifier
- WC = Wild card
- LL = Lucky loser
- Alt = Alternate
- ITF = ITF entry
- PR = Protected ranking
- SR = Special ranking
- SE = Special exempt
- JE = Junior exempt
- JR = Junior Accelerator Programme entrant
- CO = College Accelerator Programme entrant
- NG = Next Gen Accelerator Program entrant
- w/o = Walkover
- r = Retired
- d = Defaulted

=== Draw ===
First round
1	(Brazil) MF Alves (France) J Coin	6	4	[12]
(United States) E Ferris (Japan) M Hibi	0	6	[14]
(United States) E Lumpkin (United States) N Pluskota	6	6
(United States) Y Allen (United States) L Jones	0	3
3	(Australia) M Adamczak (France) V Larrière	6	6
(United States) A-L Jeukeng (United States) B Morgan	2	4
(United States) S Crawford (United States) M Keys	6	6
(China) Y Duan (Japan) S Ishizu	2	3
(United States) L Litvak (United States) S Rogers	2	5
(China) Y Xu (China) Y Zhou	6	7
(United States) D Ospina (Indonesia) R Tedjakusuma	5	1
4	(United States) M Brengle (Japan) K Hisami	7	6
(United States) J Cako (United States) B Capra	3	2
(United States) S Marand (United States) A Weinhold	6	6
(United States) L Embree (United States) J Mather	5	6	[10]
2	(Australia) B Bobusic (Australia) S Peers	7	3	[5]

Quarterfinals
(United States) E Ferris (Japan) M Hibi	4	2
(United States) E Lumpkin (United States) N Pluskota	6	6
3	(Australia) M Adamczak (France) V Larrière	6	6^{3}	[8]
(United States) S Crawford (United States) M Keys	2	7^{7}	[10]
(China) Y Xu (China) Y Zhou	6	6
4	(United States) M Brengle (Japan) K Hisami	2	0
(United States) S Marand (United States) A Weinhold	w/o
(United States) L Embree (United States) J Mather

Semifinals
(United States) E Lumpkin (United States) N Pluskota	2	3
(United States) S Crawford (United States) M Keys	6	6
(China) Y Xu (China) Y Zhou	7^{11}	6
(United States) S Marand (United States) A Weinhold	6^{9}	3

Finals
(United States) S Crawford (United States) M Keys	6	2	[12]
(China) Y Xu (China) Y Zhou	3	6	[10]
