= Diana Ospina =

Diana Ospina may refer to:

- Diana Ospina (footballer) (born 1989), Colombian international footballer
- Diana Ospina (tennis) (born 1979), American professional tennis player
