= 2012 ITF Women's Circuit – Yakima – Singles =

Yakima – Singles
- 2012 ITF Women's Circuit – Yakima

Final
- Champion: (United States) Shelby Rogers
- Runner-up: (United States) Samantha Crawford
- Score: 6–4, 6–7^{(3–7)}, 6–3

Events
Singles	Doubles
- ITF Women's Circuit – Yakima

This was a new event in 2012.

Shelby Rogers won the title defeating Samantha Crawford in the final 6–4, 6–7^{(3–7)}, 6–3.

== Seeds ==
1. (France) Irena Pavlovic (quarterfinals)
2. (United States) Madison Brengle (quarterfinals)
3. (France) Victoria Larrière (quarterfinals)
4. (United States) Madison Keys (quarterfinals)
5. (Australia) Monique Adamczak (first round)
6. (France) Julie Coin (second round)
7. (Japan) Aiko Nakamura (first round)
8. (China) Duan Yingying (first round)

== Main draw ==
Key

- Q = Qualifier
- WC = Wild card
- LL = Lucky loser
- Alt = Alternate
- ITF = ITF entry
- PR = Protected ranking
- SR = Special ranking
- SE = Special exempt
- JE = Junior exempt
- JR = Junior Accelerator Programme entrant
- CO = College Accelerator Programme entrant
- NG = Next Gen Accelerator Program entrant
- w/o = Walkover
- r = Retired
- d = Defaulted

=== Finals ===
Semifinals
(United States) Shelby Rogers	7	7
SR	(China) Zhou Yimiao	5	5
Q	(Japan) Mayo Hibi	6	5	3
(United States) Samantha Crawford	3	7	6

Final
(United States) Shelby Rogers	6	6^{3}	6
(United States) Samantha Crawford	4	7^{7}	3

=== Top half ===
First round
1	(France) I Pavlovic	6	6
(United States) E Lumpkin	2	4
(Indonesia) R Tedjakusuma	4	6	6
(United States) A Stevenson	6	4	4
(United States) S Rogers	4
WC	(United States) B Capra	2^{r}
(United States) A Weinhold	4	6	3
6	(France) J Coin	6	2	6
4	(United States) M Keys	6	6
Q	(United States) J Cako	2	2
(United States) L Litvak	7	6
(United States) E Ferris	5	1
SR	(China) Y Zhou	6	6
(Brazil) MF Alves	1	3
(China) Y Xu	2	6	6
7	(Japan) A Nakamura	6	2	3

Second round
1	(France) I Pavlovic	7	6
(Indonesia) R Tedjakusuma	5	3
(United States) S Rogers	7	6
6	(France) J Coin	5	4
4	(United States) M Keys	4	6	6
(United States) L Litvak	6	4	2
SR	(China) Y Zhou	6	6
(China) Y Xu	2	1

Quarterfinals
1	(France) I Pavlovic	1	6^{4}
(United States) S Rogers	6	7^{7}
4	(United States) M Keys	3	4
SR	(China) Y Zhou	6	6

Semifinals
(United States) S Rogers	7	7
SR	(China) Y Zhou	5	5

=== Bottom half ===
First round
5	(Australia) M Adamczak	6^{5}	1
Q	(Japan) M Hibi	7^{7}	6
WC	(United States) D Ospina	6	6
Q	(Canada) J Nejedly	2	3
(United States) A-L Jeukeng	4	0
(United States) L Embree	6	6
(Japan) K Hisami	3	0
3	(France) V Larrière	6	6
8	(China) Y Duan	4	4
(United States) S Crawford	6	6
(Japan) S Ishizu	3	3
(Australia) S Peers	6	6
Q	(United States) N Pluskota	6	6
(Australia) B Bobusic	4	2
WC	(United States) L Albanese	0	5
2	(United States) M Brengle	6	7

Second round
Q	(Japan) M Hibi	6	4	6
WC	(United States) D Ospina	5	6	4
(United States) L Embree	6	6^{6}	1
3	(France) V Larrière	4	7^{8}	6
(United States) S Crawford	6	6
(Australia) S Peers	4	3
Q	(United States) N Pluskota	2	1
2	(United States) M Brengle	6	6

Quarterfinals
Q	(Japan) M Hibi	6	6
3	(France) V Larrière	2	4
(United States) S Crawford	6	6
2	(United States) M Brengle	4	4

Semifinals
Q	(Japan) M Hibi	6	5	3
(United States) S Crawford	3	7	6
