= 2015 Boyd Tinsley Women's Clay Court Classic – Singles =

Singles
- 2015 Boyd Tinsley Women's Clay Court Classic

Final
- Champion: (United States) Allie Kiick
- Runner-up: (United States) Katerina Stewart
- Score: 7–5, 6–7^{(3–7)}, 7–5

Events
Singles	Doubles
← 2014 ·	Boyd Tinsley Women's Clay Court Classic	· 2016 →

Taylor Townsend was the defending champion, but she chose not to participate.

Allie Kiick won the title, defeating Katerina Stewart in the final, 7–5, 6–7^{(3–7)}, 7–5.

== Seeds ==
1. (United States) Sachia Vickery (first round)
2. (United States) Grace Min (first round)
3. (Portugal) Michelle Larcher de Brito (quarterfinals)
4. (United States) ~~Anna Tatishvili~~ (withdrew)
5. (United States) Louisa Chirico (first round)
6. (Argentina) Paula Ormaechea (second round)
7. (Romania) Patricia Maria Țig (first round)
8. (United States) Maria Sanchez (first round)
9. (Serbia) Jovana Jakšić (first round)

== Main draw ==
=== Key ===
- Q = Qualifier
- WC = Wild card
- LL = Lucky loser
- Alt = Alternate
- SE = Special exempt
- PR = Protected ranking
- ITF = ITF entry
- JE = Junior exempt
- w/o = Walkover
- r = Retired
- d = Defaulted
- SR = Special ranking

=== Finals ===
Semifinals
(Argentina) Florencia Molinero	2	3
SE	(United States) Katerina Stewart	6	6
Q	(Ukraine) Elizaveta Ianchuk	4	0
(United States) Allie Kiick	6	6

Final
SE	(United States) Katerina Stewart	5	7^{7}	5
(United States) Allie Kiick	7	6^{4}	7

=== Top half ===
First round
1	(United States) S Vickery	4	5
(United States) J Boserup	6	7
WC	(United States) UM Arconada	2	6	6
WC	(United States) R Valdes	6	4	3
(Argentina) F Molinero	6	6
(Australia) J Moore	2	1
WC	(United States) J Elbaba	2	1
6	(Argentina) P Ormaechea	6	6
9	(Serbia) J Jakšić	4	3
Q	(Australia) S Sanders	6	6
WC	(United States) TA Black	2	4
(Canada) F Abanda	6	6
Q	(United States) N Frenkel	6	6
(Ukraine) O Ianchuk	4	3
SE	(United States) K Stewart	6	0	6
5	(United States) L Chirico	2	6	3

Second round
(United States) J Boserup	7^{7}	5	2
WC	(United States) UM Arconada	6^{2}	7	6
(Argentina) F Molinero	6	7
6	(Argentina) P Ormaechea	3	5
Q	(Australia) S Sanders	4	2
(Canada) F Abanda	6	6
Q	(United States) N Frenkel	3	0
SE	(United States) K Stewart	6	6

Quarterfinals
WC	(United States) UM Arconada	2	1
(Argentina) F Molinero	6	6
(Canada) F Abanda	4	4
SE	(United States) K Stewart	6	6

Semifinals
(Argentina) F Molinero	2	3
SE	(United States) K Stewart	6	6

=== Bottom half ===
First round
8	(United States) M Sanchez	2	2
PR	(United States) J Pegula	6	6
Q	(Serbia) V Lukić	1	2
Q	(Ukraine) E Ianchuk	6	6
(United States) C Whoriskey	3	6	7
(Chinese Taipei) C-y Hsu	6	2	5
LL	(Russia) A Gabueva	6	5	4
3	(Portugal) M Larcher de Brito	4	7	6
7	(Romania) PM Țig	5	3
(United States) A Kiick	7	6
(Brazil) PC Gonçalves	6	6
(United States) S Crawford	4	0
(Sweden) S Arvidsson	6	2	2
(Russia) I Khromacheva	4	6	6
(Brazil) G Cé	6	6
2	(United States) G Min	0	2

Second round
PR	(United States) J Pegula	4	6	4
Q	(Ukraine) E Ianchuk	6	4	6
(United States) C Whoriskey	4	3
3	(Portugal) M Larcher de Brito	6	6
(United States) A Kiick	6	3	6
(Brazil) PC Gonçalves	4	6	4
(Russia) I Khromacheva	6	3	6
(Brazil) G Cé	2	6	2

Quarterfinals
Q	(Ukraine) E Ianchuk	7	6
3	(Portugal) M Larcher de Brito	5	4
(United States) A Kiick	6	6
(Russia) I Khromacheva	2	1

Semifinals
Q	(Ukraine) E Ianchuk	4	0
(United States) A Kiick	6	6
