= 2013 Boyd Tinsley Women's Clay Court Classic – Singles =

Singles
- 2013 Boyd Tinsley Women's Clay Court Classic

Final
- Champion: (United States) Shelby Rogers
- Runner-up: (United States) Allie Kiick
- Score: 6–3, 7–5

Events
Singles	Doubles
← 2012 ·	Boyd Tinsley Women's Clay Court Classic	· 2014 →

Melanie Oudin was the defending champion, having won the event in 2012, but chose not to defend her title.

Shelby Rogers won the title, defeating Allie Kiick in the final, 6–3, 7–5.

== Seeds ==
1. (United States) Coco Vandeweghe (second round)
2. (Germany) Tatjana Maria (first round)
3. (United States) Maria Sanchez (first round)
4. (United States) Alexa Glatch (first round; retired)
5. (United States) Julia Cohen (quarterfinals)
6. (United States) Jessica Pegula (second round)
7. (China) Zhang Shuai (first round)
8. (United States) Irina Falconi (second round; retired)

== Main draw ==
=== Key ===
- Q = Qualifier
- WC = Wild card
- LL = Lucky loser
- Alt = Alternate
- SE = Special exempt
- PR = Protected ranking
- ITF = ITF entry
- JE = Junior exempt
- w/o = Walkover
- r = Retired
- d = Defaulted
- SR = Special ranking

=== Finals ===
Semifinals
(United States) Madison Brengle	4	3
WC	(United States) Allie Kiick	6	6
(United States) Shelby Rogers	7^{7}	4
(Austria) Patricia Mayr-Achleitner	6^{5}	2^{r}

Final
WC	(United States) Allie Kiick	3	5
(United States) Shelby Rogers	6	7

=== Top half ===
First round
1	(United States) C Vandeweghe	6	6
(Paraguay) V Cepede Royg	3	1
(Belarus) I Kremen	6	6
Q	(United States) Cha Scholl	1	2
(Croatia) A Tomljanović	3	5
(United States) M Brengle	6	7
(Italy) A Brianti	3	1
6	(United States) J Pegula	6	6
4	(United States) A Glatch	6^{2}	0^{r}
Q	(United States) J Abaza	7^{7}	3
WC	(United States) L Hardenbergh	3	2
WC	(United States) A Kiick	6	6
(Spain) L Pous Tió	6	6
(France) I Pavlovic	4	0
(Russia) A Rodionova	4	4
5	(United States) J Cohen	6	6

Second round
1	(United States) C Vandeweghe	2	0
(Belarus) I Kremen	6	6
(United States) M Brengle	6	6
6	(United States) J Pegula	1	4
Q	(United States) J Abaza	6	2	3
WC	(United States) A Kiick	4	6	6
(Spain) L Pous Tió	7	4	0
5	(United States) J Cohen	5	6	6

Quarterfinals
(Belarus) I Kremen	6^{5}	3
(United States) M Brengle	7^{7}	6
WC	(United States) A Kiick	6	1	6
5	(United States) J Cohen	4	6	0

Semifinals
(United States) M Brengle	4	3
WC	(United States) A Kiick	6	6

=== Bottom half ===
First round
7	(China) S Zhang	6	2	4
WC	(United States) A Will	1	6	6
(United States) C-y Hsu	6	6
WC	(United States) A Weinhold	4	1
(United Kingdom) E Baltacha	6	5	2
(United States) A Riske	4	7	6
(United States) S Rogers	6	6
3	(United States) M Sanchez	2	3
8	(United States) I Falconi	6	3	6
Q	(Slovenia) P Rampre	4	6	0
(United States) S Crawford	2	3
(Austria) P Mayr-Achleitner	6	6
(Venezuela) A Pérez	5	1
Q	(United States) S Marand	7	6
(United States) N Gibbs	6	6
2	(Germany) T Maria	1	4

Second round
WC	(United States) A Will	6	6
(United States) C-y Hsu	0	2
(United States) A Riske	3	2
(United States) S Rogers	6	6
8	(United States) I Falconi	2	0^{r}
(Austria) P Mayr-Achleitner	6	3
Q	(United States) S Marand	4	6	1
(United States) N Gibbs	6	2	6

Quarterfinals
WC	(United States) A Will	0	2
(United States) S Rogers	6	6
(Austria) P Mayr-Achleitner	6	6
(United States) N Gibbs	3	3

Semifinals
(United States) S Rogers	7^{7}	4
(Austria) P Mayr-Achleitner	6^{5}	2^{r}
