= 2013 Boyd Tinsley Women's Clay Court Classic – Doubles =

Doubles
- 2013 Boyd Tinsley Women's Clay Court Classic

Final
- Champions: (United Kingdom) Nicola Slater (United States) Coco Vandeweghe
- Runners-up: (United States) Nicole Gibbs (United States) Shelby Rogers
- Score: 6–3, 7–6^{(7–4)}

Events
Singles	Doubles
← 2012 ·	Boyd Tinsley Women's Clay Court Classic	· 2014 →

Maria Sanchez and Yasmin Schnack were the defending champions, having won the event in 2012, but Schnack chose not to defend her title. Sanchez paired up with Irina Falconi, but lost in the first round to Kateřina Kramperová and Ilona Kremen.

Nicola Slater and Coco Vandeweghe won the title, defeating Nicole Gibbs and Shelby Rogers in the final, 6–3, 7–6^{(7–4)}.

== Seeds ==
1. (United States) Lindsay Lee-Waters / (United States) Jessica Pegula (first round)
2. (United States) Irina Falconi / (United States) Maria Sanchez (first round)
3. (United States) Julia Cohen / (Germany) Tatjana Maria (first round)
4. (United States) Asia Muhammad / (United States) Allie Will (quarterfinals)

== Draw ==
=== Key ===
- Q = Qualifier
- WC = Wild card
- LL = Lucky loser
- Alt = Alternate
- SE = Special exempt
- PR = Protected ranking
- ITF = ITF entry
- JE = Junior exempt
- w/o = Walkover
- r = Retired
- d = Defaulted
- SR = Special ranking

First round
1	(United States) L Lee-Waters (United States) J Pegula	1	1
(France) I Pavlovic (Russia) A Rodionova	6	6
(United States) A Mueller (United States) N Pluskota	5	4
(Paraguay) V Cepede Royg (Venezuela) A Pérez	7	6
4	(United States) A Muhammad (United States) A Will	5	6	[11]
(United States) E Harman (United States) E Lumpkin	7	4	[9]
WC	(United States) N Gibbs (United States) S Rogers	6	6
(United States) M Brengle (United States) A Glatch	3	3
(United States) C-y Hsu (Ukraine) A Sotnikova	3	6	[7]
(United States) J Elie (Australia) S Peers	6	3	[10]
(Brazil) MF Alves (Australia) J Moore	6	6
3	(United States) J Cohen (Germany) T Maria	4	3
(United States) S Marand (United States) A Weinhold	6	2	[5]
(United Kingdom) N Slater (United States) C Vandeweghe	4	6	[10]
(Czech Republic) K Kramperová (Belarus) I Kremen	6	6
2	(United States) I Falconi (United States) M Sanchez	0	4

Quarterfinals
(France) I Pavlovic (Russia) A Rodionova	6	6
(Paraguay) V Cepede Royg (Venezuela) A Pérez	3	1
4	(United States) A Muhammad (United States) A Will	2	7	[6]
WC	(United States) N Gibbs (United States) S Rogers	6	5	[10]
(United States) J Elie (Australia) S Peers	6	3	[6]
(Brazil) MF Alves (Australia) J Moore	4	6	[10]
(United Kingdom) N Slater (United States) C Vandeweghe	7	6
(Czech Republic) K Kramperová (Belarus) I Kremen	5	3

Semifinals
(France) I Pavlovic (Russia) A Rodionova	5	5
WC	(United States) N Gibbs (United States) S Rogers	7	7
(Brazil) MF Alves (Australia) J Moore	1	6^{0}
(United Kingdom) N Slater (United States) C Vandeweghe	6	7^{7}

Final
WC	(United States) N Gibbs (United States) S Rogers	3	6^{4}
(United Kingdom) N Slater (United States) C Vandeweghe	6	7^{7}
