= 2012 FSP Gold River Women's Challenger – Singles =

Singles
- 2012 FSP Gold River Women's Challenger

Final
- Champion: (United States) Maria Sanchez
- Runner-up: (United States) Jessica Pegula
- Score: 4–6, 6–3, 6–1

Events
Singles	Doubles
← 2011 ·	FSP Gold River Women's Challenger	· 2013 →

This was the first edition of the tennis tournament.

Maria Sanchez won the title defeating Jessica Pegula in the final 4–6, 6–3, 6–1.

== Seeds ==
1. (Russia) Elena Bovina (quarterfinals)
2. (United States) Ashley Weinhold (quarterfinals)
3. (Canada) Marie-Ève Pelletier (first round)
4. (United States) Maria Sanchez (champion)
5. (United States) Jessica Pegula (final)
6. (Venezuela) Adriana Pérez (first round)
7. (Russia) Valeria Solovieva (semifinals)
8. (Venezuela) Gabriela Paz (second round, retired)

== Draw ==
=== Key ===
- Q = Qualifier
- WC = Wild card
- LL = Lucky loser
- Alt = Alternate
- SE = Special exempt
- PR = Protected ranking
- ITF = ITF entry
- JE = Junior exempt
- w/o = Walkover
- r = Retired
- d = Defaulted
- SR = Special ranking

=== Finals ===
Semifinals
7	(Russia) Valeria Solovieva	0	1
4	(United States) Maria Sanchez	6	6
(United States) Samantha Crawford	2	6	4
5	(United States) Jessica Pegula	6	3	6

Final
4	(United States) Maria Sanchez	4	6	6
5	(United States) Jessica Pegula	6	3	1

=== Top half ===
First round
1	(Russia) E Bovina	6	6
Q	(United States) E Profit	1	0
(Japan) S Ishizu	0	1
(Brazil) MF Alves	6	6
WC	(United States) BA Bachini	2	3
(United States) W Jones	6	6
(France) C Cattaneo	3	0
7	(Russia) V Solovieva	6	6
4	(United States) M Sanchez	6	6
Q	(United States) M Closs	3	1
(Finland) P Suomalainen	3	3	r
WC	(United States) G Andrews	6	4
WC	(United States) E Lumpkin	6	6
(Germany) K Grajdek	2	1
(Indonesia) R Tedjakusuma	7^{7}	7
6	(Venezuela) A Pérez	6^{2}	5

Second round
1	(Russia) E Bovina	6	6
(Brazil) MF Alves	3	0
(United States) W Jones	2	3
7	(Russia) V Solovieva	6	6
4	(United States) M Sanchez	3	7	6
WC	(United States) G Andrews	6	5	2
WC	(United States) E Lumpkin	4	6^{0}
(Indonesia) R Tedjakusuma	6	7^{7}

Quarterfinals
1	(Russia) E Bovina	1	2
7	(Russia) V Solovieva	6	6
4	(United States) M Sanchez	6	6
(Indonesia) R Tedjakusuma	3	3

Semifinals
7	(Russia) V Solovieva	0	1
4	(United States) M Sanchez	6	6

=== Bottom half ===
First round
8	(Venezuela) G Paz	6	6
(United States) A-L Jeukeng	3	3
(United States) A Muhammed	6	7^{7}
(United States) D Ospina	4	6^{4}
Q	(United States) T Kinard	7	4	3
(United States) S Crawford	5	6	6
(United States) Y Schnack	6	3	6
3	(Canada) M-È Pelletier	3	6	3
5	(United States) J Pegula	6	6
(United States) E Ferris	4	0
(United States) J Elie	6	6
(United States) C-y Hsu	0	4
(United States) L Litvak	3	6	6
(United States) A Stevenson	6	3	3
Q	(Belarus) T Kapshay	1	0
2	(United States) A Weinhold	6	6

Second round
8	(Venezuela) G Paz	1	0	r
(United States) A Muhammed	6	4
(United States) S Crawford	6	4	6
(United States) Y Schnack	2	6	3
5	(United States) J Pegula	6	7
(United States) J Elie	3	5
(United States) L Litvak	4	3
2	(United States) A Weinhold	6	6

Quarterfinals
(United States) A Muhammed	6	4	1
(United States) S Crawford	1	6	6
5	(United States) J Pegula	7	6
2	(United States) A Weinhold	5	4

Semifinals
(United States) S Crawford	2	6	4
5	(United States) J Pegula	6	3	6
