= 2012 FSP Gold River Women's Challenger =

- Date: 28 May – 3 June
- Edition: 1st
- Surface: Hard
- Location: Sacramento, California, United States

Champions

Singles
- (United States) Maria Sanchez

Doubles
- (United States) Asia Muhammad / (United States) Yasmin Schnack
FSP Gold River Women's Challenger	· 2013 →

The 2012 FSP Gold River Women's Challenger was a professional tennis tournament played on hard courts. It was the first edition of the tournament which was part of the 2012 ITF Women's Circuit. It took place in Sacramento, California, United States between 28 May and 3 June 2012.

== WTA entrants ==
=== Seeds ===
Country	Player	Rank^{1}	Seed
RUS	Elena Bovina	243	1
USA	Ashley Weinhold	265	2
CAN	Marie-Ève Pelletier	280	3
USA	Maria Sanchez	283	4
USA	Jessica Pegula	290	5
VEN	Adriana Pérez	301	6
RUS	Valeria Solovieva	316	7
VEN	Gabriela Paz	323	8

- ^{1} Rankings are as of May 21, 2012.

=== Other entrants ===
The following players received wildcards into the singles main draw:

- (United States) Gabrielle Andrews
- (United States) Elizabeth Lumpkin
- (United States) Breanna Alexa Bachini

The following players received entry from the qualifying draw:

- (United States) Mary Closs
- (Belarus) Tatsiana Kapshay
- (United States) Tori Kinard
- (United States) Elizabeth Profit

== Champions ==
=== Singles ===
- (United States) Maria Sanchez def. (United States) Jessica Pegula, 4–6, 6–3, 6–1

=== Doubles ===
- (United States) Asia Muhammad / (United States) Yasmin Schnack def. (United States) Kaitlyn Christian / (United States) Maria Sanchez, 6–3, 7–6^{(7–4)}
