= Yakima Regional Hospital Challenger =

ITF Women's Tour
- Event name: Yakima
- Location: Yakima, Washington, United States
- Venue: Yakima Tennis Club
- Category: ITF Women's Circuit
- Surface: Hard
- Draw: 32S/32Q/16D
- Prize money: $50,000
- Website: www.yakimatennis.com

The Yakima Regional Hospital Challenger was a tournament for professional female tennis players played on outdoor hard courts. The event was classified as a $50,000 ITF Women's Circuit tournament and was held in Yakima, Washington, United States, in 2012 and 2013. The 2014 event was cancelled due to a fire in May and the tournament was moved to Carson, California (the USTA Player Development Classic).

== Past finals ==
=== Singles ===
Year	Champion	Runner-up	Score
2013	(United States) Nicole Gibbs	(Croatia) Ivana Lisjak	6–1, 6–4
2012	(United States) Shelby Rogers	(United States) Samantha Crawford	6–4, 6–7^{(3–7)}, 6–3

=== Doubles ===
Year	Champions	Runners-up	Score
2013	(United States) Jan Abaza (United States) Allie Will	(United Kingdom) Naomi Broady (United States) Irina Falconi	7–5, 3–6, [10–3]
2012	(United States) Samantha Crawford (United States) Madison Keys	(China) Xu Yifan (China) Zhou Yimiao	6–3, 2–6, [12–10]
