= Diana Ospina (tennis) =

American tennis player

- Full name: Diana Ospina-Taylor
- Country (sports): United States
- Born: July 4, 1979 (age 45); Michigan, U.S.
- Retired: 2013
- Plays: Right-handed
- Prize money: $111,044

Singles
- Career record: 222-222
- Career titles: 0 WTA / 5 ITF
- Highest ranking: No. 231 (November 24, 2003)

Doubles
- Career record: 23-62
- Career titles: 0 WTA / 1 ITF
- Highest ranking: No. 337 (August 2, 2004)

Diana Ospina-Taylor (born July 4, 1979) is a former professional tennis player from the United States.

== Biography ==
Ospina is the youngest of three children and only daughter of Luis Fernando and Maria. Her father is an endocrinologist and she was raised in Bloomfield Hills in metropolitan Detroit.

A right-handed player, she claimed her first ITF circuit title in Mexico City in 1997. Ospina won a total of five ITF singles tournaments during her career and was a regular in WTA Tour qualifiers, twice making the main draw. She qualified for the 2003 Kroger St. Jude International in Memphis and featured in the 2005 Challenge Bell in Quebec City as a lucky loser.

Since retiring she has worked as a tennis coach, most recently as a member of staff at Franklin Athletic Club. She has also been an assistant coach for the University of Detroit Mercy's tennis team.

== ITF finals ==
=== Singles (5–1) ===
$100,000 tournaments
$75,000 tournaments
$50,000 tournaments
$25,000 tournaments
$10,000 tournaments

Outcome	No.	Date	Tournament	Surface	Opponent	Score
Winner	1.	4 October 1997	Mexico City, Mexico	Hard	(Israel) Jacquelyn Rosen	6–2, 7–6
Runner-up	2.	31 May 1998	El Paso, United States	Hard	(Russia) Elena Bovina	6–3, 6–7, 6–7
Winner	3.	15 June 2003	Allentown, United States	Hard	(United States) Jewel Peterson	2–6, 6–2, 6–0
Winner	4.	13 June 2004	Allentown, United States	Hard	(Uzbekistan) Varvara Lepchenko	6–4, 6–2
Winner	5.	26 March 2006	Redding, United States	Hard	(United Kingdom) Anne Keothavong	6–3, 3–6, 6–1
Winner	6.	13 May 2006	Monzón, Spain	Hard	(United Kingdom) Amanda Keen	6–4, 6–2

=== Doubles (1–0) ===
Outcome	No.	Date	Tournament	Surface	Partner	Opponents	Score
Winner	1.	13 June 2004	Allentown, United States	Hard	(United States) Angela Haynes	(United States) Cory Ann Avants (Uzbekistan) Varvara Lepchenko	6–0, 6–2
