= Allie Kiick =

American tennis player (born 1995)

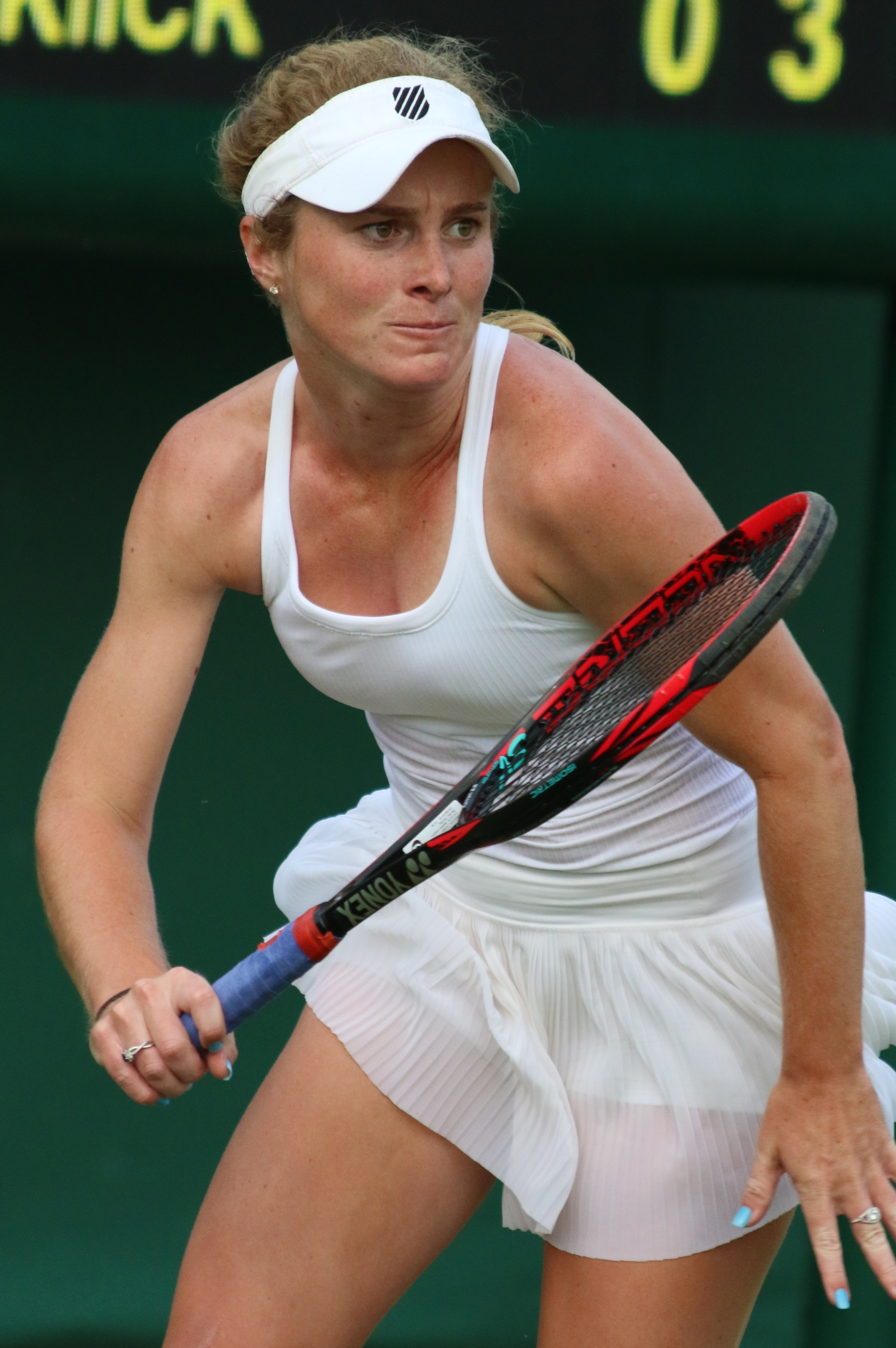
- Kiick at the 2019 Wimbledon Qualifying
- Full name: Alexandra Kiick
- Country (sports): United States
- Born: June 30, 1995 (age 30) Fort Lauderdale, Florida, U.S.
- Height: 5 ft 7 in (1.70 m)
- Turned pro: 2015
- Plays: Right (two-handed backhand)
- Coach: Lisa Raymond
- Prize money: US$ 610,160

Singles
- Career record: 278–201
- Career titles: 7 ITF
- Highest ranking: No. 126 (June 17, 2019)

Grand Slam singles results
- Australian Open: Q2 (2019, 2020)
- French Open: Q3 (2014)
- Wimbledon: Q1 (2014, 2015, 2021)
- US Open: 1R (2017, 2020)

Doubles
- Career record: 60–44
- Career titles: 2 ITF
- Highest ranking: No. 214 (May 19, 2014)

Grand Slam doubles results
- US Open: 1R (2012, 2013)
- Last updated on: June 11, 2026.

Alexandra Kiick (/kɪk/; born June 30, 1995) is an American inactive tennis player.

Kiick has won seven singles and two doubles titles on the ITF Women's Circuit. In June 2019, she reached her career-high singles ranking of world No. 126. In May 2014, she peaked at No. 214 in the WTA doubles rankings.

== Personal life ==
Kiick's parents are mother Mary, a former professional softball player, and father Jim Kiick, a former NFL player who won two Super Bowls with the Miami Dolphins. Allie described her father as her hero upon his death. She has one brother, Austin. Her mother introduced her to tennis at the age of nine. Kiick was coached at USTA by Kathy Rinaldi and Adam Peterson. Her idol growing up was Kim Clijsters.

== Career overview ==
Kiick started on the pro tour in 2015.

However, between August 2015 and May 2017, Kiick did not play in any ITF Circuit tournaments. She was sidelined during this time because she was diagnosed with stage-II-skin cancer (melanoma) and severe knee injuries that caused her to be out for a total of three years and two months. She also was diagnosed with mononucleosis. In 2021, she was diagnosed with acoustic neuroma.

== ITF Circuit finals ==
=== Singles: 15 (7 titles, 8 runner-ups) ===
Legend W50/60 tournaments W25/35 tournaments W10 tournaments	Finals by surface Hard (1–2) Clay (6–6)

Result	W–L	Date	Tournament	Tier	Surface	Opponent	Score
Win	1–0	Sep 2011	ITF Amelia Island, United States	10,000	Clay	(United States) Chalena Scholl	6–7^{(5)}, 6–2, 6–3
Win	2–0	Mar 2013	ITF Gainesville, United States	10,000	Clay	(Czech Republic) Kateřina Kramperová	7–5, 6–1
Loss	2–1	Apr 2013	Charlottesville Classic, US	50,000	Clay	(United States) Shelby Rogers	3–6, 5–7
Win	3–1	Dec 2013	ITF Mérida, Mexico	25,000	Hard	(Croatia) Ajla Tomljanović	3–6, 7–5, 6–0
Loss	3–2	Jan 2014	ITF Daytona Beach, US	25,000	Clay	(Georgia (country)) Anna Tatishvili	1–6, 3–6
Win	4–2	Apr 2015	Charlottesville Open, US	50,000	Clay	(United States) Katerina Stewart	7–5, 6–7^{(3)}, 7–5
Loss	4–3	Apr 2018	ITF Pelham, United States	25,000	Clay	(Poland) Iga Świątek	2–6, 0–6
Win	5–3	Jul 2018	ITF Båstad, Sweden	25,000	Clay	(Bulgaria) Isabella Shinikova	6–2, 6–1
Loss	5–4	Jun 2018	ITF Denain, France	25,000	Clay	(Ukraine) Valeriya Strakhova	6–3, 6–7^{(5)}, 0–6
Win	6–4	Jun 2019	ITF Barcelona, Spain	W60	Clay	(Turkey) Çağla Büyükakçay	7–6^{(3)}, 3–6, 6–1
Win	7–4	Oct 2019	ITF Cúcuta, Colombia	W25	Clay	(Switzerland) Conny Perrin	6–2, 6–2
Loss	7–5	Nov 2021	ITF Orlando, United States	W25	Clay	(United States) Emma Navarro	6–3, 2–6, 3–6
Loss	7–6	Jun 2023	ITF Colorado Springs, US	W25	Hard	(Serbia) Katarina Kozarov	3–6, 1–6
Loss	7–7	Sep 2023	ITF Berkeley, United States	W60	Hard	(Canada) Marina Stakusic	3–6, 4–6
Loss	7–8	Jan 2024	ITF Naples, United States	W35	Clay	(United States) Clervie Ngounoue	1–6, 1–6

=== Doubles: 8 (2 titles, 6 runner-ups) ===
Legend $80,000 tournaments $25,000 tournaments	Finals by surface Hard (1–4) Clay (1–2)

Result	W–L	Date	Tournament	Tier	Surface	Partner	Opponents	Score
Loss	0–1	Oct 2011	ITF Bayamón, Puerto Rico	25,000	Hard	(United States) Victoria Duval	(South Africa) Chanel Simmonds (Croatia) Ajla Tomljanović	3–6, 1–6
Loss	0–2	Feb 2013	Launceston International, Australia	25,000	Hard	(Canada) Erin Routliffe	(Russia) Ksenia Lykina (United Kingdom) Emily Webley-Smith	5–7, 3–6
Win	1–2	Jul 2013	ITF Winnipeg, Canada	25,000	Hard	(Canada) Heidi El Tabakh	(United Kingdom) Samantha Murray (United Kingdom) Jade Windley	6–4, 2–6, [10–8]
Loss	1–3	Sep 2013	ITF Redding, US	25,000	Hard	(United States) Jacqueline Cako	(United States) Robin Anderson (United States) Lauren Embree	4–6, 7–5, [7–10]
Loss	1–4	Oct 2013	ITF Rock Hill, US	25,000	Hard	(United States) Asia Muhammad	(Colombia) Mariana Duque (Argentina) María Irigoyen	6–4, 6–7^{(5)}, [10–12]
Loss	1–5	Mar 2014	ITF Innisbrook, US	25,000	Clay	(United States) Sachia Vickery	(Italy) Gioia Barbieri (United States) Julia Cohen	6–7^{(5)}, 0–6
Loss	1–6	May 2018	ITF Charleston Pro, US	80,000	Clay	(United States) Louisa Chirico	(Chile) Alexa Guarachi (New Zealand) Erin Routliffe	1–6, 6–3, [5–10]
Win	2–6	Jan 2022	Vero Beach Open, US	W25	Clay	(United States) Sophie Chang	(United States) Anna Rogers (United States) Christina Rosca	6–3, 6–3
