= Shelby Rogers =

American tennis player (born 1992)

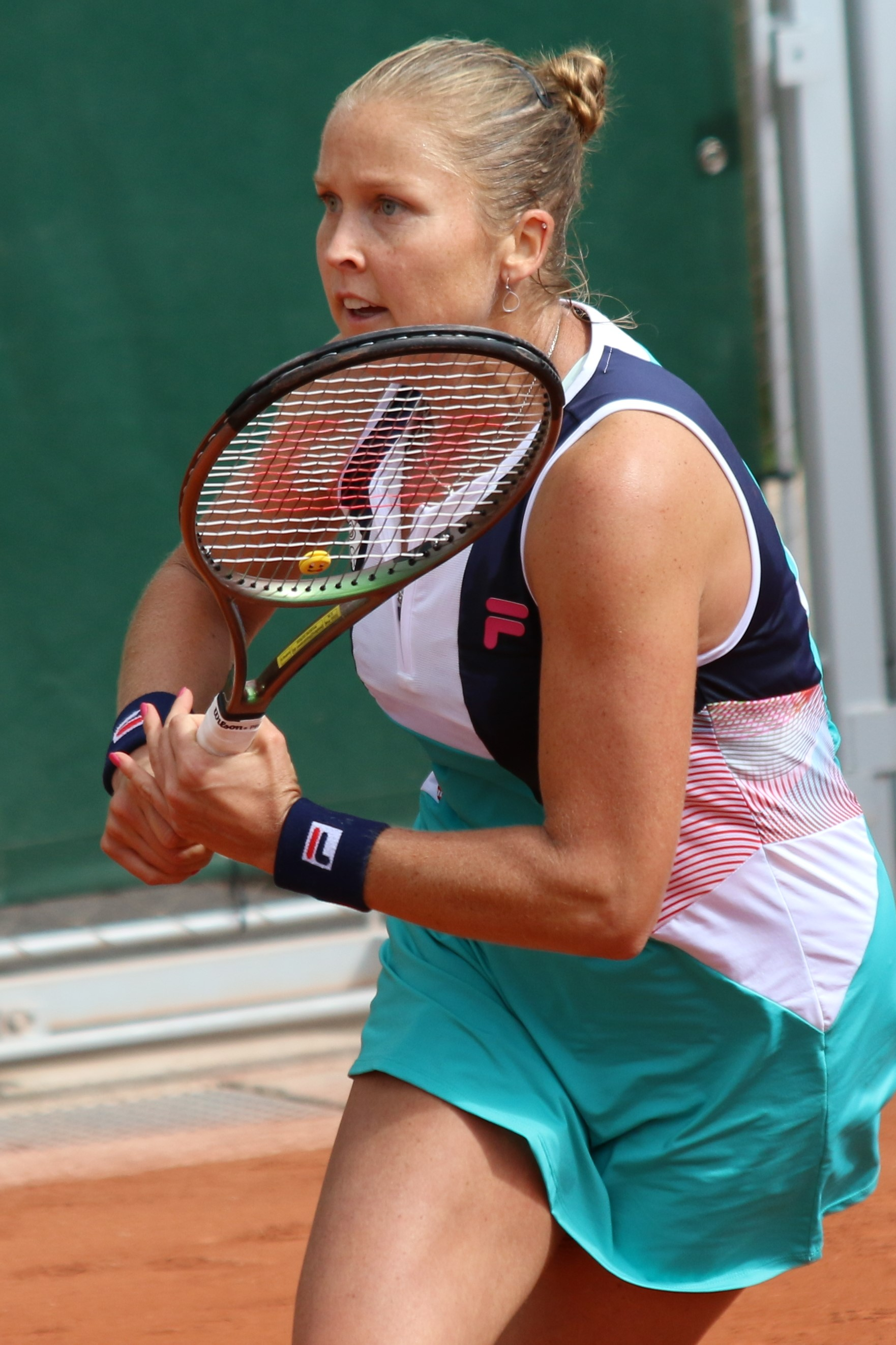
- Rogers at the 2022 French Open
- Country (sports): United States
- Residence: Charleston, South Carolina, U.S.
- Born: October 13, 1992 (age 33) Mount Pleasant, South Carolina, U.S.
- Height: 1.75 m (5 ft 9 in)
- Turned pro: 2010
- Retired: August 2024
- Plays: Right-handed (two-handed backhand)
- Coach: Piotr Sierzputowski
- Prize money: US$ 5,729,262

Singles
- Career record: 307–263
- Career titles: 0
- Highest ranking: No. 30 (August 8, 2022)
- Current ranking: No. 341 (December 30, 2024)

Grand Slam singles results
- Australian Open: 4R (2021)
- French Open: QF (2016)
- Wimbledon: 3R (2017, 2021)
- US Open: QF (2020)

Doubles
- Career record: 80–94
- Career titles: 0
- Highest ranking: No. 40 (February 28, 2022)
- Current ranking: No. 385 (December 30, 2024)

Grand Slam doubles results
- Australian Open: QF (2022)
- French Open: QF (2021)
- Wimbledon: 2R (2016, 2021, 2022)
- US Open: 2R (2016, 2020, 2021, 2024)

Mixed doubles

Grand Slam mixed doubles results
- US Open: 1R (2014, 2024)

Team competitions
- Fed Cup: W (2017), record 2–4

Shelby Nicole Rogers (born October 13, 1992) is an American former professional tennis player. She had career-high WTA rankings of No. 30 in singles and No. 40 in doubles, and won six singles and two doubles titles on the ITF Women's Circuit. Rogers won the girls' national championship at 17. Her best results at the majors were quarterfinals at the 2016 French Open and the 2020 US Open.

Rogers was noted for her victories against top-ranked players which include Simona Halep (No. 4) at the 2017 Australian Open, Serena Williams (No. 9) at the 2020 Lexington Challenger and Ashleigh Barty (No. 1) at the 2021 US Open. Rogers is also undefeated against two-time Wimbledon champion Petra Kvitová, with wins at the 2016 French Open and 2020 US Open, the latter in which she saved four match points. Both are also the only instances in her career where she made the quarterfinals at the majors.

== Personal life ==
From Mount Pleasant, South Carolina, Rogers followed her sister, Sabra, into tennis at the age of six. She was quickly identified by her coaches for her natural athletic ability and started competing on the national stage by the age of 11. Home-schooled during high school, Rogers was able to focus on her tennis and quickly started receiving scholarship offers from the top schools in the U.S.

In 2009, she decided to forgo college and become a professional tennis player. On August 15, 2021, Rogers was awarded with a Bachelor of Science in psychology from Indiana University East in a ceremony at the Western Southern Open (WSO) tournament.

Rogers is a Christian. On December 2, 2023, she married John Slavik.

== Career ==
=== 2009–15: Early years, first career final ===
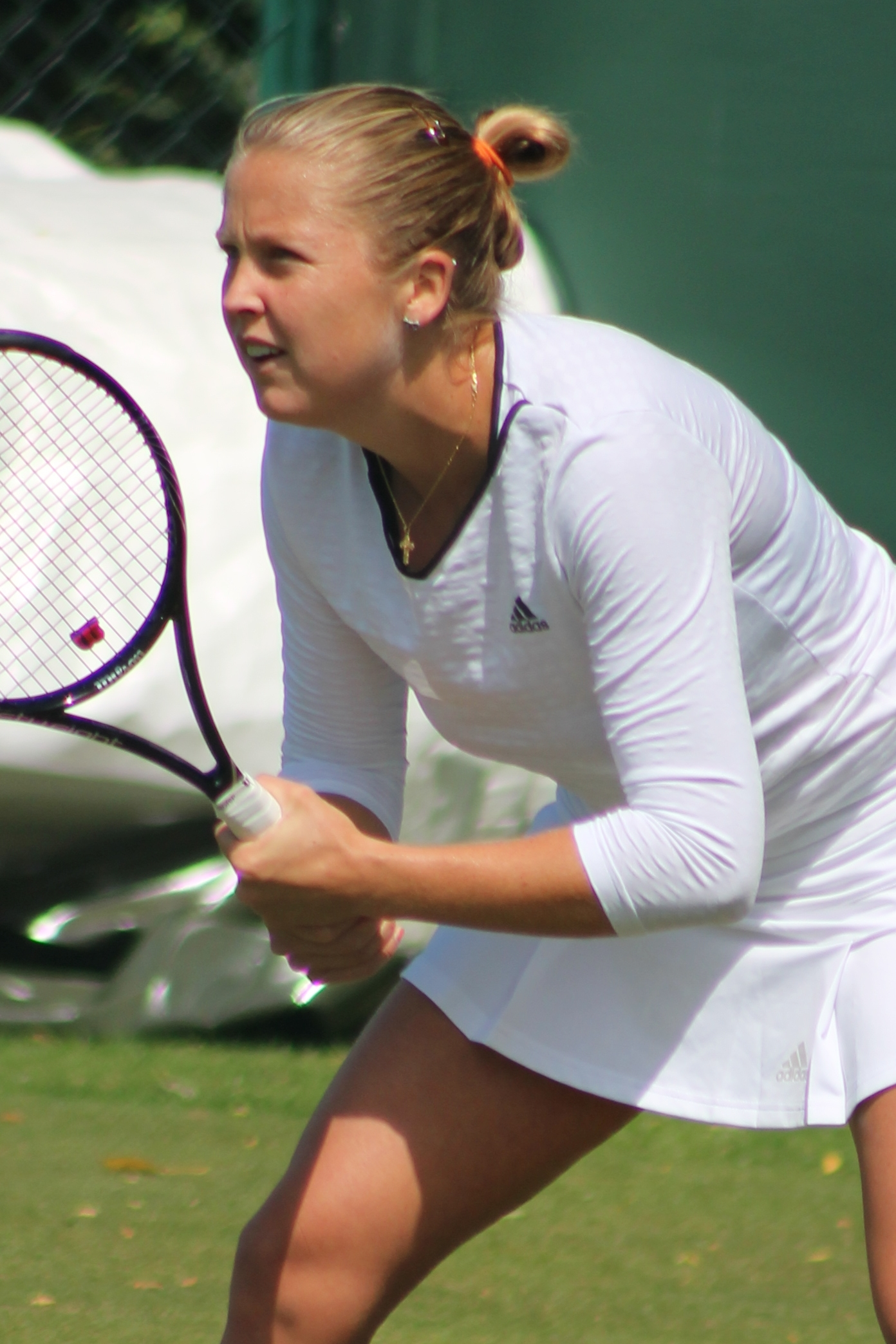
Rogers at the 2014 Wimbledon Championships

Rogers made her ITF Women's Circuit debut at the $10k event in St. Joseph in July 2009. At the 2010 Charleston Open, she had a chance to reach her first WTA Tour main draw, but she failed in qualifying. In May 2010, she reached her first ITF final at the $50k Indian Harbour Beach, but lost to Edina Gallovits-Hall. Later that year, she won the USTA 18s Girls National Championship to earn a wildcard into the US Open, that was her first appearance in the main draw of any Grand Slam tournament. She lost to Peng Shuai in the first round in three sets. In July 2012, she won her first ITF title at the $50k Yakima Challenger, defeating Samantha Crawford in the final.

At the 2013 Internationaux de Strasbourg, she recorded her first win on the WTA Tour, defeating Marta Domachowska in the first round. She then earned another Grand Slam main-draw wildcard at the 2013 French Open, after winning the "Har-Tru USTA Pro Circuit Wild Card Challenge". With the wildcard, she won her first career Grand Slam match, over Irena Pavlovic. She then lost in the following round to the world No. 20, Carla Suárez Navarro. After that, she won titles at the $50k Lexington Challenger, and later at the $75k Albuquerque Championships.

The following year, she reached her first WTA final at the 2014 Gastein Ladies where she lost to Andrea Petkovic. There she also defeated two top-20 players, Carla Suárez Navarro and Sara Errani. Soon after that, she scored her first career top-ten win after beating Eugenie Bouchard in the second round of the Canadian Open. The following week, she debuted at the top 100. In September, she reached semifinal of the Tournoi de Québec, but then lost to Venus Williams. Despite not producing such good performances during the season of 2015, Rogers played in all four Grand Slam main draws for the first time in her career, and also reached her first Grand Slam third round at the US Open.

=== 2016–17: French Open quarterfinal, breakthrough, Wimbledon 3rd round ===
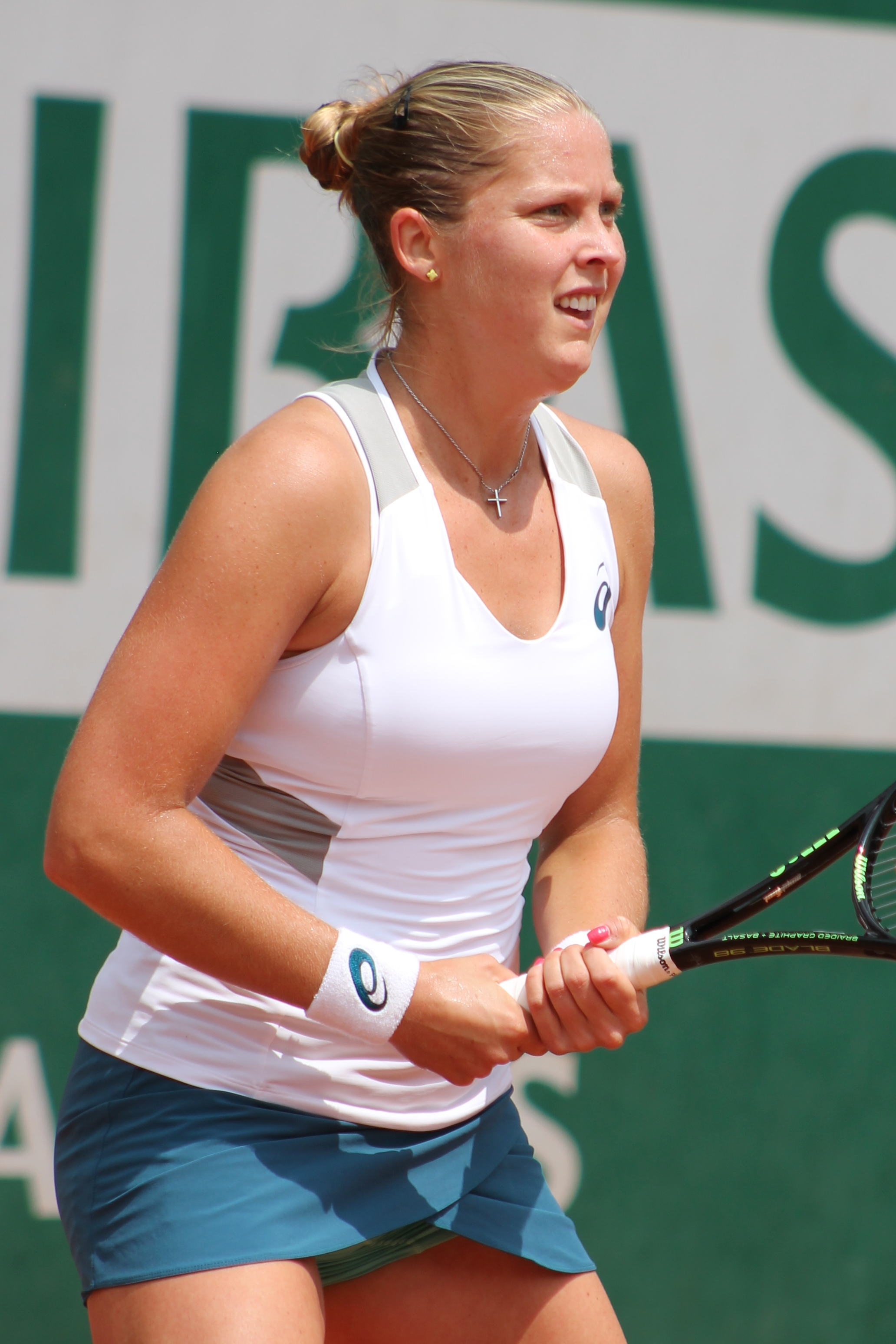
Rogers at the 2016 French Open

Although she missed the Australian Open due to injury, Rogers began the year strongly by reaching her second career final on the WTA Tour, losing to Francesca Schiavone at the Rio Open on clay in February. Things then did not do well for Rogers, with early losses in the following three months.

However, she then reached her first Grand Slam quarterfinal at the French Open. She became the first American other than Serena Williams to reach the quarterfinals since Venus Williams in 2006. Along the way, she defeated three seeded players including No. 12, Petra Kvitová and No. 19, Karolína Plíšková. In the quarterfinal match, she lost to eventual champion Garbiñe Muguruza. With this run, she also rose to the top 60 for the first time. Despite making big progress, she then continued to struggle again with results by the end of the year.

During the 2017 season, she continued to progress. In the opening week, she defeated top-10 player Eugenie Bouchard, in her first match of the year at the 2017 Brisbane International. She then participated at the Hobart International, where she reached the quarterfinals. At the Australian Open, she upset world No. 4, Simona Halep, 6–3, 6–1 in the first round. She started her clay-court season with a quarterfinal at the Premier-level Charleston Open, where she also defeated compatriot and world No. 11, Madison Keys. After early losses at the Italian Open and Madrid Open, she reached the quarterfinals of the Internationaux de Strasbourg.

She followed this up with a third round showing at the French Open. At Wimbledon, she reached another major third round, but then lost to world No. 1, Angelique Kerber. At the US Open, she reached the third round of a major for the third time during the season, but was stopped by another top-10 player, Elina Svitolina.

=== 2018–20: From injury to progress, US Open quarterfinal ===
After battling a knee injury for some time, Rogers underwent knee surgery in May 2018. From the start of the 2018, she played only at the Australian Open and Indian Wells Open, but was knocked out in the first round in both tournaments. She was out of play for the rest of the season.

She returned to action at the Charleston Open in April 2019 and won her first match, defeating Evgeniya Rodina in straight sets. However, she lost her next match to Jeļena Ostapenko in three sets, after having been 5–1 up in the third set and having match points.

Later, she reached the second round of the French Open and Mallorca Open. In September 2019, she won the $60k Templeton Open, that was her first ITF title since September 2013. In October 2019, she reached the final of the $80k Classic of Macon which she lost to her compatriot Katerina Stewart.

She enjoyed a successful campaign on American hardcourts in the summer of 2020. She made the semifinals at the Lexington Open, after upsetting Serena Williams in the previous round. Then, at the US Open, she beat Irina Khromacheva, 11th seed Elena Rybakina, Madison Brengle, and sixth seed Petra Kvitová before losing to Naomi Osaka in the quarterfinals. She returned to the top 60 after that.

=== 2021: Australian Open 4th round, first major quarterfinal, top 40 in singles ===
Rogers reached the fourth round of the Australian Open, her best showing at this major, where she was defeated by world No. 1 and top seed, Ash Barty.

Shelby raised to a career-high of 46, after reaching the round of 16 of the Charleston Open where she lost again to Ash Barty.

At Indian Wells, she reached the first WTA 1000 singles quarterfinal of her career.

At the French Open, she reached the quarterfinals in doubles, partnering Petra Martić and defeating ninth-seeded pair of Sharon Fichman and Giuliana Olmos. The pair reached also as alternates the quarterfinals of the Madrid Open.

At Wimbledon, Rogers reached the third round for a second time, defeating 15th seed Maria Sakkari. This was her 16th victory over a top-20 player in her career. As a result, she marked a new career-high at world No. 40.

At the US Open, Rogers reached the round of 16 by defeating the top seed, Ash Barty.

=== 2022: Major quarterfinal & top 40 in doubles, WTA 500 final & top 30 in singles ===
On 10 January 2022, after reaching the quarterfinals with a defeat over world No. 6 and third seed, Maria Sakkari, at the Adelaide International, she recorded a new career-high in singles at No. 36.

In doubles, she reached the quarterfinals of the Australian Open, partnering Petra Martić. Following the tournament, she reached also a new career-high in the top 40, on 28 February 2022. She hired Piotr Sierzputowski, Iga Świątek's former coach, around this time.

At the French Open, she upset world No. 9, Danielle Collins, to reach the third round for the third time in her career before losing to 20th seed Daria Kasatkina.

At the Rosmalen Open, she reached the semifinals defeating Kirsten Flipkens. However, she lost to top seed Aryna Sabalenka.

At the Silicon Valley Classic, she reached the semifinals again defeating Bianca Andreescu, top seed Maria Sakkari again (the third top-5 win in her career) and Amanda Anisimova. She did not lose a set in the three matches, while only dropping 18 games. She ended up reaching the third final and first at a WTA 500 event in her career, defeating Veronika Kudermetova, also in straight sets. She lost to seventh seed Daria Kasatkina in the final. As a result, she entered the top 30 in singles, on 8 August 2022.

=== 2023–24: Hiatus, comeback and retirement ===
Rogers started the 2023 season at the two Adelaide Internationals. At the Australian Open, she lost in the second round to eventual champion, Aryna Sabalenka, in straight sets.

At the Charleston Open, she advanced to the round of 16 defeating 13th seed Danielle Collins and Caty McNally, before losing to defending champion and eventual runner-up, fourth seed Belinda Bencic.

Seeded 33rd at the Madrid Open, she reached the third round for the first time at this tournament defeating Ana Bogdan, before losing to another Romanian, 31st seed Irina Camelia Begu.

After a hiatus of more than half a year, Rogers returned to the WTA Tour at the 2024 Australian Open, suffering a straight sets defeat in the first round against Emma Raducanu. She also entered the main draw at the Miami Open using protected ranking, and won her first match after being back over wildcard Linda Fruhvirtová before losing to Anastasia Pavlyuchenkova.

On 23 August 2024, Rogers announced her impending retirement from professional tour, with the US Open as her final tournament. She lost in the first round to sixth seed Jessica Pegula.

== Performance timelines ==
Key
| W | F | SF | QF | #R | RR | Q# | DNQ | A | NH |

(W) winner; (F) finalist; (SF) semifinalist; (QF) quarterfinalist; (#R) rounds 4, 3, 2, 1; (RR) round-robin stage; (Q#) qualification round; (DNQ) did not qualify; (A) absent; (NH) not held; (SR) strike rate (events won / competed); (W–L) win–loss record.
To avoid confusion and double counting, these charts are updated at the conclusion of a tournament or when the player's participation has ended.

Only main-draw results in WTA Tour, Grand Slam tournaments, Fed Cup/Billie Jean King Cup and Olympic Games are included in win–loss records.

=== Singles ===
Current through the 2023 Italian Open.

| Tournament | 2010 | 2011 | 2012 | 2013 | 2014 | 2015 | 2016 | 2017 | 2018 | 2019 | 2020 | 2021 | 2022 | 2023 | SR | W–L | Win% |
|---|---|---|---|---|---|---|---|---|---|---|---|---|---|---|---|---|---|
Grand Slam tournaments
| Australian Open | A | A | A | Q1 | Q2 | 1R | A | 2R | 1R | A | 1R | 4R | 1R | 2R | 0 / 7 | 5–7 | 42% |
| French Open | A | A | A | 2R | 1R | 1R | QF | 3R | A | 2R | 1R | 1R | 3R | 1R | 0 / 10 | 10–10 | 50% |
| Wimbledon | A | A | A | Q1 | Q2 | 1R | 1R | 3R | A | 1R | NH | 3R | 1R | 1R | 0 / 7 | 4–7 | 36% |
| US Open | 1R | A | Q2 | 1R | 2R | 3R | 2R | 3R | A | Q1 | QF | 4R | 3R | A | 0 / 9 | 15–9 | 63% |
| Win–loss | 0–1 | 0–0 | 0–0 | 1–2 | 1–2 | 2–4 | 5–3 | 7–4 | 0–1 | 1–2 | 4–3 | 8–4 | 4–4 | 1–3 | 0 / 33 | 34–33 | 51% |
WTA 1000
| Dubai / Qatar Open (Note: The first Premier 5 event of the year has switched back and forth between the Dubai Tennis Championships and the Qatar Ladies Open since 2009. Dubai was classified as a Premier 5 event from 2009 to 2011 before being succeeded by Doha for the 2012–2014 period. In 2015, Dubai regained its Premier 5 status while Doha was demoted to Premier status. The Premier 5 tournaments were reclassified as WTA 1000 tournaments in 2021.) | A | A | A | A | A | A | A | A | A | A | A | 2R | 1R | 2R | 0 / 3 | 2–3 | 33% |
| Indian Wells Open | A | A | A | A | 2R | 1R | 2R | 2R | 1R | A | NH | QF | 3R | 2R | 0 / 8 | 10–8 | 56% |
| Miami Open | A | A | A | A | Q1 | 1R | Q1 | 3R | A | A | NH | 2R | 3R | 2R | 0 / 5 | 6–5 | 56% |
| Madrid Open | A | A | A | A | A | A | A | Q2 | A | A | NH | 1R | 1R | 3R | 0 / 3 | 1–3 | 25% |
| Italian Open | A | A | A | A | A | Q1 | A | 1R | A | A | A | 1R | 1R | 1R | 0 / 4 | 0–4 | 0% |
| Canadian Open | A | A | A | A | 3R | A | 1R | A | A | Q1 | NH | 1R | A | A | 0 / 3 | 2–3 | 40% |
| Cincinnati Open | A | A | A | Q1 | Q1 | A | A | A | A | Q1 | Q2 | 2R | 3R | A | 0 / 2 | 2–2 | 50% |
| Pan Pacific / Wuhan Open (Note: In 2014, the Pan Pacific Open was downgraded to a Premier event and replaced by the Wuhan Open. The Premier 5 tournaments were reclassified as WTA 1000 tournaments in 2021.) | A | A | A | A | A | A | 1R | A | A | A | NH | | | | 0 / 1 | 0–1 | 0% |
| China Open | A | A | A | A | Q2 | A | 1R | 1R | A | A | NH | | | | 0 / 2 | 0–2 | 0% |
| Guadalajara Open | NH | | | | | | | | | | | | A | A | 0 / 0 | 0–0 | – |
Career statistics
| Tournaments | 1 | 1 | 0 | 3 | 9 | 14 | 15 | 19 | 2 | 9 | 6 | 21 | 19 | 10 | Career total: 129 | | |
| Titles | 0 | 0 | 0 | 0 | 0 | 0 | 0 | 0 | 0 | 0 | 0 | 0 | 0 | 0 | Career total: 0 | | |
| Finals | 0 | 0 | 0 | 0 | 1 | 0 | 1 | 0 | 0 | 0 | 0 | 0 | 1 | 0 | Career total: 3 | | |
| Overall win–loss | 0–1 | 0–1 | 0–0 | 2–3 | 12–9 | 4–14 | 13–15 | 23–20 | 0–2 | 3–9 | 8–6 | 28–22 | 19–19 | 9–9 | 0 / 130 | 121–131 | 48% |
| Year-end ranking | 341 | 434 | 217 | 123 | 72 | 146 | 60 | 59 | 780 | 174 | 58 | 40 | 46 | 145 | $4,942,487 | | |

=== Doubles ===
| Tournament | 2013 | 2014 | 2015 | 2016 | 2017 | 2018 | 2019 | 2020 | 2021 | 2022 | 2023 | 2024 | SR | W–L |
|---|---|---|---|---|---|---|---|---|---|---|---|---|---|---|
Grand Slam tournaments
| Australian Open | A | A | 2R | A | 1R | A | A | A | 1R | QF | 1R | A | 0 / 5 | 4–5 |
| French Open | A | A | 1R | A | 1R | A | 2R | 2R | QF | 1R | 2R | A | 0 / 7 | 6–7 |
| Wimbledon | A | A | A | 2R | 1R | A | 1R | NH | 2R | 2R | A | A | 0 / 5 | 3–5 |
| US Open | 1R | 1R | A | 2R | 1R | A | A | 2R | 2R | A | A | 2R | 0 / 7 | 4–7 |
| Win–loss | 0–1 | 0–1 | 1–2 | 2–2 | 0–4 | 0–0 | 1–2 | 2–2 | 5–4 | 4–3 | 1–2 | 1–1 | 0 / 24 | 17–24 |
WTA 1000
| Indian Wells Open | A | A | A | A | 1R | A | A | NH | 1R | 1R | A | A | 0 / 3 | 0–3 |
| Miami Open | A | A | A | A | A | A | A | NH | 2R | A | A | A | 0 / 1 | 1–1 |
| Madrid Open | A | A | A | A | 1R | A | A | NH | QF | A | A | A | 0 / 2 | 2–2 |
| Italian Open | A | A | A | A | A | A | A | A | A | 1R | A | A | 0 / 1 | 0–1 |
| Canadian Open | A | A | A | 2R | A | A | A | NH | A | A | A | A | 0 / 1 | 1–1 |
| Cincinnati Open | A | A | A | A | A | A | A | QF | 1R | A | A | A | 0 / 2 | 2–2 |
| Guadalajara Open | NMS/NH | | | | | | | | | 1R | A | A | 0 / 1 | 0–1 |
Career statistics
| Year-end ranking | 285 | 460 | 158 | 120 | 246 | N/A | 331 | 156 | 73 | 126 | 482 | | | |

== WTA Tour finals ==
=== Singles: 3 (3 runner-ups) ===
| Legend Grand Slam (0–0) WTA 1000 (0–0) WTA 500 (0–1) WTA 250 (Note: The WTA International tournaments were reclassified as WTA 250 tournaments in 2021.) (0–2) | Finals by surface Hard (0–1) Clay (0–2) Grass (0–0) Carpet (0–0) |

| Result | W–L | Date | Tournament | Tier | Surface | Opponent | Score |
|---|---|---|---|---|---|---|---|
| Loss | 0–1 | Jul 2014 | Gastein Ladies, Austria | International | Clay | (Germany) Andrea Petkovic | 3–6, 3–6 |
| Loss | 0–2 | Feb 2016 | Rio Open, Brazil | International | Clay | (Italy) Francesca Schiavone | 6–2, 2–6, 2–6 |
| Loss | 0–3 | Aug 2022 | Silicon Valley Classic, United States | WTA 500 | Hard | Daria Kasatkina | 7–6^{(7–2)}, 1–6, 2–6 |

=== Doubles: 1 (runner-up) ===
| Legend Grand Slam (0–0) WTA 1000 (0–0) WTA 500 (0–0) WTA 250 (0–1) | Finals by surface Hard (0–0) Clay (0–1) Grass (0–0) Carpet (0–0) |

| Result | Date | Tournament | Tier | Surface | Partner | Opponents | Score |
|---|---|---|---|---|---|---|---|
| Loss | Apr 2015 | Copa Colsanitas, Colombia | International | Clay | (United States) Irina Falconi | (Brazil) Paula Cristina Gonçalves (Brazil) Beatriz Haddad Maia | 3–6, 6–3, [6–10] |

== ITF Circuit finals ==
=== Singles: 10 (6 titles, 4 runner–ups) ===
| Legend $100,000 tournaments $75/80,000 tournaments $50/60,000 tournaments | Finals by surface Hard (5–3) Clay (1–1) |

| Result | W–L | Date | Tournament | Tier | Surface | Opponent | Score |
|---|---|---|---|---|---|---|---|
| Loss | 0–1 | May 2010 | ITF Indian Harbour Beach, United States | 50,000 | Clay | (Romania) Edina Gallovits-Hall | 2–6, 6–3, 6–4 |
| Win | 1–1 | Jul 2012 | Yakima Challenger, US | 50,000 | Hard | (United States) Samantha Crawford | 6–4, 6–7^{(3)}, 6–3 |
| Loss | 1–2 | Sep 2012 | Las Vegas Open, US | 50,000 | Hard | (United States) Lauren Davis | 6–7^{(5)}, 6–2, 6–2 |
| Win | 2–2 | Apr 2013 | Charlottesville Open, US | 50,000 | Clay | (United States) Allie Kiick | 6–3, 7–5 |
| Win | 3–2 | Jul 2013 | Lexington Challenger, US | 50,000 | Hard | (France) Julie Coin | 6–4, 7–6^{(3)} |
| Win | 4–2 | Sep 2013 | Albuquerque Championships, US | 75,000 | Hard | (United States) Anna Tatishvili | 6–2, 6–3 |
| Loss | 4–3 | Sep 2015 | Las Vegas Open, US | 50,000 | Hard | (Netherlands) Michaëlla Krajicek | 3–6, 1–6 |
| Win | 5–3 | Sep 2019 | Templeton Open, US | 60,000 | Hard | (United States) CoCo Vandeweghe | 4–6, 6–2, 6–3 |
| Loss | 5–4 | Oct 2019 | Tennis Classic of Macon, US | 80,000 | Hard | (United States) Katerina Stewart | 7–6^{(2)}, 3–6, 2–6 |
| Win | 6–4 | Feb 2020 | Midland Tennis Classic, US | 100,000 | Hard (i) | (Ukraine) Anhelina Kalinina | w/o |

=== Doubles: 7 (2 titles, 5 runner–ups) ===
| Legend $100,000 tournaments $50,000 tournaments $10,000 tournaments | Finals by surface Hard (1–3) Clay (0–2) Grass (1–0) |

| Result | W–L | Date | Tournament | Tier | Surface | Partner | Opponents | Score |
|---|---|---|---|---|---|---|---|---|
| Loss | 0–1 | Jun 2010 | ITF Mount Pleasant, United States | 10,000 | Hard | (Slovenia) Petra Rampre | (United States) Kaitlyn Christian (United States) Caitlin Whoriskey | 4–6, 2–6 |
| Win | 1–1 | Jul 2012 | Colorado International, US | 50,000 | Hard | (Canada) Marie-Ève Pelletier | (United States) Lauren Embree (United States) Nicole Gibbs | 6–3, 3–6, [12–10] |
| Loss | 1–2 | Apr 2013 | Charlottesville Open, US | 50,000 | Clay | (United States) Nicole Gibbs | (United Kingdom) Nicola Slater (United States) CoCo Vandeweghe | 3–6, 6–7^{(4)} |
| Loss | 1–3 | Apr 2014 | Dothan Pro Classic, US | 50,000 | Hard | (Australia) Olivia Rogowska | (Estonia) Anett Kontaveit (Belarus) Ilona Kremen | 1–6, 7–5, [5–10] |
| Win | 2–3 | Jun 2015 | Eastbourne Trophy, UK | 50,000 | Grass | (United States) CoCo Vandeweghe | (United Kingdom) Jocelyn Rae (United Kingdom) Anna Smith | 7–5, 7–6^{(1)} |
| Loss | 2–4 | Feb 2016 | Midland Tennis Classic, US | 100,000 | Hard (i) | (United Kingdom) Naomi Broady | (United States) CiCi Bellis (United States) Ingrid Neel | 2–6, 4–6 |
| Loss | 2–5 | May 2016 | Charlottesville Open, US | 50,000 | Clay | (Russia) Alexandra Panova | (United States) Asia Muhammad (United States) Taylor Townsend | 6–7^{(4)}, 0–6 |

== WTA Tour career earnings ==
Current after the 2022 Wimbledon.

| Year | Grand Slam singles titles | WTA singles titles | Total singles titles | Earnings ($) | Money list rank |
|---|---|---|---|---|---|
| 2014 | 0 | 0 | 0 | 226,718 | 119 |
| 2015 | 0 | 0 | 0 | 302,655 | 107 |
| 2016 | 0 | 0 | 0 | 587,327 | 57 |
| 2017 | 0 | 0 | 0 | 662,138 | 49 |
| 2018 | 0 | 0 | 0 | 61,134 | 265 |
| 2019 | 0 | 0 | 0 | 236,447 | 147 |
| 2020 | 0 | 0 | 0 | 645,776 | 25 |
| 2021 | 0 | 0 | 0 | 1,150,273 | 27 |
| 2022 | 0 | 0 | 0 | 776,725 | 47 |
| Career | 0 | 0 | 0 | 4,942,487 | 135 |

== Career Grand Slam statistics ==
=== Seedings ===
The tournaments won by Rogers are in boldface, and advanced into finals by Rogers are in italics.

| Year | Australian Open | French Open | Wimbledon | US Open |
|---|---|---|---|---|
| 2010 | absent | absent | absent | wild card |
| 2011 | absent | absent | absent | absent |
| 2012 | absent | absent | absent | did not qualify |
| 2013 | did not qualify | wild card | did not qualify | wild card |
| 2014 | did not qualify | not seeded | did not qualify | not seeded |
| 2015 | not seeded | not seeded | not seeded | qualifier |
| 2016 | absent | not seeded | not seeded | not seeded |
| 2017 | not seeded | not seeded | not seeded | not seeded |
| 2018 | not seeded | absent | absent | absent |
| 2019 | absent | protected ranking | protected ranking | did not qualify |
| 2020 | qualifier | not seeded | cancelled | not seeded |
| 2021 | not seeded | not seeded | not seeded | not seeded |
| 2022 | not seeded | not seeded | 30th | 31st |
| 2023 | not seeded | | | |

=== Best Grand Slam results details ===
Grand Slam winners are in boldface, and runner–ups are in italics.

==== Singles ====
**Australian Open**
**2021 (unseeded)**
| Round | Opponent | Rank | Score |
| 1R | **(United Kingdom)** Francesca Jones (Q) | 245 | 6–4, 6–1 |
| 2R | **(Serbia)** Olga Danilović (Q) | 183 | 6–2, 6–3 |
| 3R | **(Estonia)** Anett Kontaveit (21) | 22 | 6–4, 6–3 |
| 4R | **(Australia)** Ashleigh Barty (1) | **1** | 3–6, 4–6 |

**Wimbledon Championships**
**2017 (unseeded)**
| Round | Opponent | Rank | Score |
| 1R | **(United States)** Julia Boserup | 81 | 6–3, 4–6, 6–3 |
| 2R | **(Czech Republic)** Lucie Šafářová (32) | 34 | 6–7, 6–4, 6–3 |
| 3R | **(Germany)** Angelique Kerber (1) | **1** | 6–4, 6–7, 4–6 |
**2021 (unseeded)**
| Round | Opponent | Rank | Score |
| 1R | **(Australia)** Samantha Stosur | 166 | 6–1, 5–7, 6–3 |
| 2R | **(Greece)** Maria Sakkari (15) | 18 | 7–5, 6–4 |
| 3R | **(Kazakhstan)** Elena Rybakina (18) | 20 | 1–6, 4–6 |

**French Open**
**2016 (unseeded)**
| Round | Opponent | Rank | Score |
| 1R | **(Czech Republic)** Karolína Plíšková (17) | 19 | 3–6, 6–4, 6–3 |
| 2R | **(Russia)** Elena Vesnina | 49 | 6–4, 6–2 |
| 3R | **(Czech Republic)** Petra Kvitová (10) | 12 | 6–0, 6–7, 6–0 |
| 4R | **(Romania)** Irina-Camelia Begu (25) | 28 | 6–3, 6–4 |
| QF | **(Spain) Garbiñe Muguruza (4)** | 4 | 5–7, 3–6 |

**US Open**
**2020 (unseeded)**
| Round | Opponent | Rank | Score |
| 1R | **(Russia)** Irina Khromacheva | 674 | 6–2, 6–2 |
| 2R | **(Kazakhstan)** Elena Rybakina (11) | 17 | 7–5, 6–1 |
| 3R | **(United States)** Madison Brengle | 84 | 6–2, 6–4 |
| 4R | **(Czech Republic)** Petra Kvitová (6) | 12 | 7–6, 3–6, 7–6 |
| QF | **(Japan) Naomi Osaka (4)** | 9 | 3–6, 4–6 |

=== Wins over top 10 players ===
| # | Player | Rk | Event | Surface | Rd | Score | Rk | Ref |
|---|---|---|---|---|---|---|---|---|
**2014**
| 1. | (Canada) Eugenie Bouchard | 8 | Rogers Cup, Canada | Hard | 2R | 6–0, 2–6, 6–0 | 113 | |
**2017**
| 2. | (Romania) Simona Halep | 4 | Australian Open, Australia | Hard | 1R | 6–3, 6–1 | 57 | |
**2020**
| 3. | (United States) Serena Williams | 9 | Lexington International, US | Hard | QF | 1–6, 6–4, 7–6^{(7–5)} | 116 | |
**2021**
| 4. | (Australia) Ashleigh Barty | **1** | US Open, United States | Hard | 3R | 6–2, 1–6, 7–6^{(7–5)} | 43 | |
**2022**
| 5. | (Greece) Maria Sakkari | 6 | Adelaide International, Australia | Hard | 2R | 7–6^{(7–5)}, 2–6, 6–4 | 40 | |
| 6. | (United States) Danielle Collins | 9 | French Open, France | Clay | 2R | 6–4, 6–3 | 50 | |
| 7. | (Greece) Maria Sakkari | 3 | Silicon Valley Classic, US | Hard | 2R | 6–1, 6–3 | 45 | |
