= Maria Sanchez (tennis) =

American tennis player (born 1989)

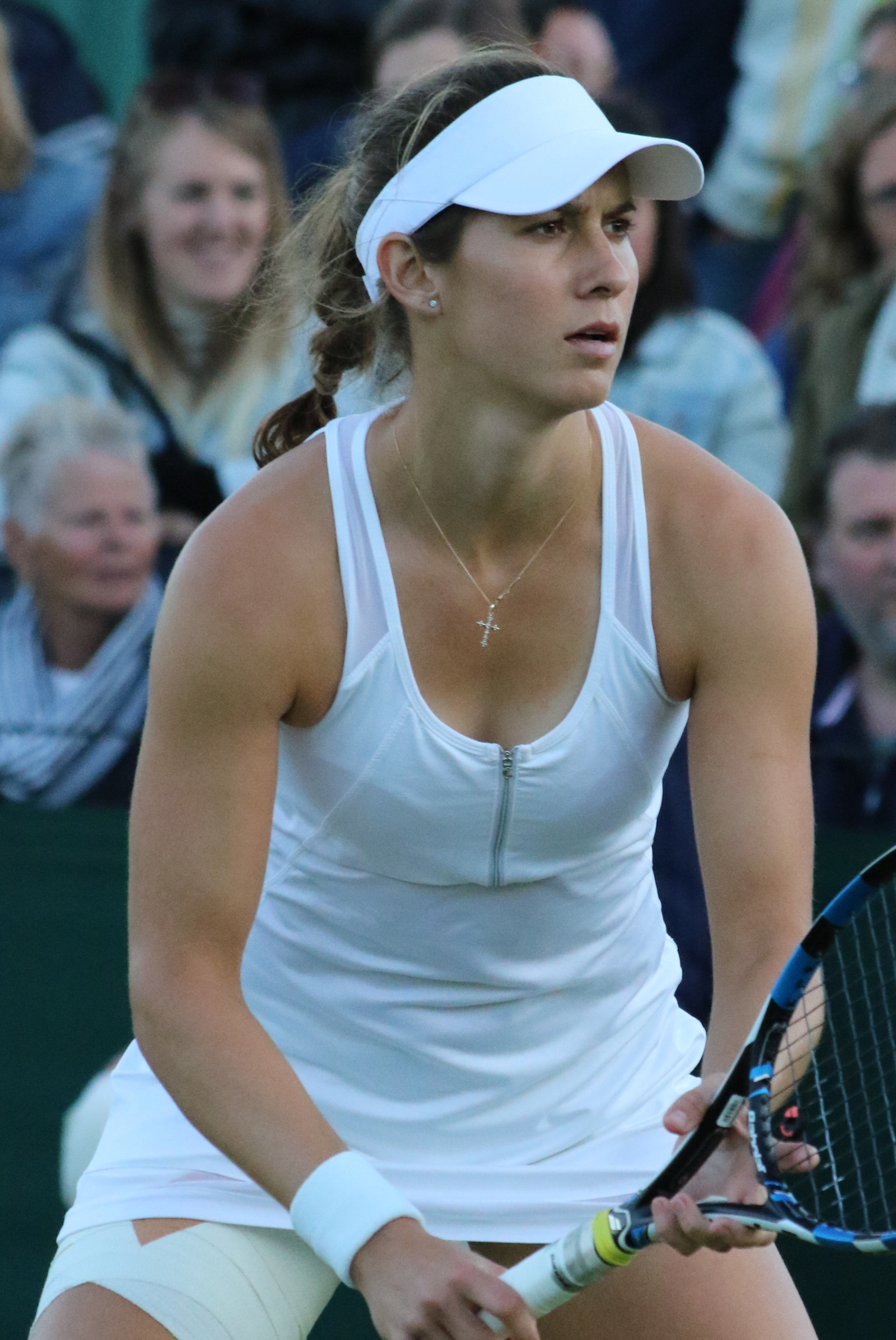
- Sanchez in Wimbledon, 2016
- Full name: Maria Victoria Sanchez
- Country (sports): United States
- Residence: Boca Raton, Florida
- Born: November 26, 1989 (age 36) Modesto, California
- Height: 5 ft 10 in (1.78 m)
- Turned pro: 2011
- Plays: Right (two-handed backhand)
- Prize money: $616,495

Singles
- Career record: 249–218
- Career titles: 2 ITF
- Highest ranking: No. 107 (July 8, 2013)

Grand Slam singles results
- Australian Open: Q2 (2013, 2016)
- French Open: Q2 (2013, 2015)
- Wimbledon: Q2 (2013, 2015)
- US Open: 1R (2013)

Doubles
- Career record: 287–167
- Career titles: 3 WTA, 1 WTA 125
- Highest ranking: No. 51 (April 22, 2019)

Grand Slam doubles results
- Australian Open: 2R (2016, 2017)
- French Open: 1R (2016, 2017, 2020)
- Wimbledon: 3R (2016)
- US Open: 2R (2012, 2015, 2016)

Maria Victoria Sanchez (born November 26, 1989) is a former tennis player from the United States. In July 2013, she reached her career-high singles ranking of world No. 107. On 22 April 2019, she peaked at No. 51 of the WTA doubles ranking. Sanchez has been primarily a doubles player. In doubles, she won three WTA titles, one WTA 125 title, and 24 ITF titles. She also won two ITF singles titles.

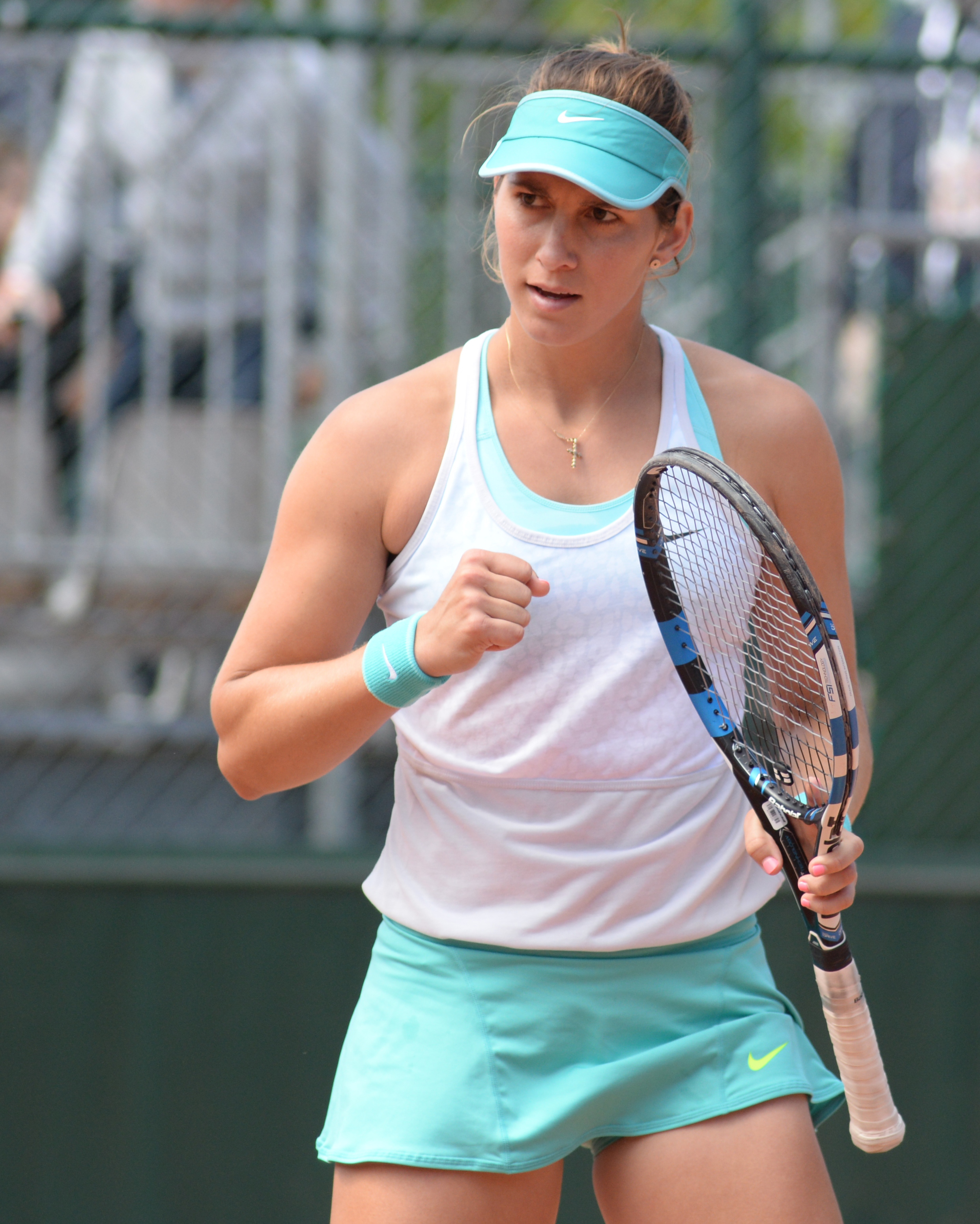
Maria Sanchez, 2013

== College ==
Sanchez attended the University of Southern California where she was a three-time All-American in singles and doubles. She was the No. 1 collegiate player throughout the 2011–2012 season and was named the ITA Senior Player of the Year. While at USC, star quarterback Matt Barkley was quoted as saying that Sanchez was his favorite athlete on campus.

== Career ==
=== 2012 ===
In her first full season on tour, Sanchez climbed over 530 spots in the world rankings. She captured the Gold River Challenger $50k title in Northern California, defeating Jessica Pegula in a three-set final. The win marked her first pro title. Sanchez quickly added a second title at the Coleman Vision Championships $75k event in Albuquerque, New Mexico in September, where she defeated American teenager Lauren Davis, 6–1, 6–1.

=== 2021: Last match ===
Sanchez competed her last pro match in July 2021 at the WTA 125 event in Charleston, where she lost her quarterfinal match in the doubles draw.

=== Doubles performance timeline ===
Key
W	F	SF	QF	#R	RR	Q#	DNQ	A	NH

(W) winner; (F) finalist; (SF) semifinalist; (QF) quarterfinalist; (#R) rounds 4, 3, 2, 1; (RR) round-robin stage; (Q#) qualification round; (DNQ) did not qualify; (A) absent; (NH) not held; (SR) strike rate (events won / competed); (W–L) win–loss record.
To avoid confusion and double counting, these charts are updated at the conclusion of a tournament or when the player's participation has ended.

Tournament	2012	2013	2014	2015	2016	2017	2018	2019	2020	W–L
Australian Open	A	A	A	A	2R	2R	A	A	A	2–2
French Open	A	A	A	A	1R	1R	A	1R	1R	0–4
Wimbledon	A	Q1	Q1	2R	3R	1R	A	1R	NH	3–4
US Open	2R	1R	1R	2R	2R	A	A	1R	A	3–6
Win–Loss	1–1	0–1	0–1	2–2	4–4	1–3	0–0	0–3	0–1	8–16

== WTA Tour finals ==
=== Doubles: 5 (3 titles, 2 runner-ups) ===
Legend Premier International (3–2)	Finals by surface Hard (2–2) Carpet (1–0)

Result	W–L	Date	Tournament	Tier	Surface	Partner	Opponents	Score
Win	1–0	Jan 2014	Auckland Open, New Zealand	International	Hard	(Canada) Sharon Fichman	(Czech Republic) Lucie Hradecká (Netherlands) Michaëlla Krajicek	2–6, 6–0, [10–4]
Loss	1–1	Mar 2016	Monterrey Open, Mexico	International	Hard	(Croatia) Petra Martić	(Spain) Anabel Medina Garrigues (Spain) Arantxa Parra Santonja	6–4, 5–7, [7–10]
Win	2–1	Sep 2018	Tournoi de Québec, Canada	International	Carpet (i)	(United States) Asia Muhammad	(Croatia) Darija Jurak (Switzerland) Xenia Knoll	6–4, 6–3
Win	3–1	Apr 2019	Monterrey Open, Mexico	International	Hard	(United States) Asia Muhammad	(Australia) Monique Adamczak (Australia) Jessica Moore	7–6^{(7–2)}, 6–4
Loss	3–2	Aug 2019	Washington Open, US	International	Hard	(Hungary) Fanny Stollár	(United States) Coco Gauff (United States) Caty McNally	2–6, 2–6

== WTA 125 finals ==
=== Doubles: 2 (1 title, 1 runner-up) ===
Result	W–L	Date	Tournament	Surface	Partner	Opponents	Score
Loss	0–1	Sep 2018	Chicago Challenger, United States	Hard	(United States) Asia Muhammad	(Germany) Mona Barthel (Czech Republic) Kristýna Plíšková	3–6, 2–6
Win	1–1	Mar 2019	Guadalajara Challenger, Mexico	Hard	(Hungary) Fanny Stollár	(Sweden) Cornelia Lister (Czech Republic) Renata Voráčová	7–5, 6–1

== ITF Circuit finals ==
=== Singles: 8 (2 titles, 6 runner-ups) ===
Legend $100,000 tournaments $75/80,000 tournaments $50/60,000 tournaments $25,000 tournaments $10,000 tournaments	Finals by surface Hard (2–4) Clay (0–2)

Result	W–L	Date	Tournament	Tier	Surface	Opponent	Score
Loss	0–1	Apr 2012	ITF Indian Harbour Beach, United States	50,000	Clay	(United States) Grace Min	4–6, 6–7
Win	1–1	May 2012	Sacramento Challenger, United States	50,000	Hard	(United States) Jessica Pegula	4–6, 6–3, 6–1
Win	2–1	Sep 2012	Albuquerque Championships, US	75,000	Hard	(United States) Lauren Davis	6–1, 6–1
Loss	2–2	Nov 2012	Phoenix Tennis Classic, United States	75,000	Hard	(United States) Madison Keys	3–6, 6–7
Loss	2–3	May 2014	ITF Raleigh, United States	25,000	Clay	(Canada) Heidi El Tabakh	3–6, 4–6
Loss	2–4	Nov 2014	Toronto Challenger, Canada	50,000	Hard (i)	(Canada) Gabriela Dabrowski	4–6, 6–2, 6–7^{(7)}
Loss	2–5	Feb 2015	Rancho Santa Fe Open, United States	25,000	Hard	(United States) CiCi Bellis	2–6, 0–6
Loss	2–6	Sep 2017	Albuquerque Championships, US	80,000	Hard	(United States) Emina Bektas	4–6, 2–6

=== Doubles: 44 (24 titles, 20 runner-ups) ===
Result	No.	Date	Tournament	Surface	Partner	Opponents	Score
Win	1.	20 July 2009	ITF Evansville, US	Hard	(United States) Yasmin Schnack	(United States) Kaitlyn Christian (United States) Lindsey Nelson	4–6, 6–1, [10–4]
Loss	1.	18 July 2010	ITF Atlanta, United States	Hard	(United States) Irina Falconi	(United States) Kristy Frilling (Israel) Julia Glushko	2–6, 6–2, [7–10]
Win	2.	31 July 2010	ITF St. Joseph, US	Hard	(United States) Ellen Tsay	(Thailand) Noppawan Lertcheewakarn (Venezuela) Gabriela Paz	4–6, 6–4, [10–5]
Loss	2.	3 October 2010	Las Vegas Open, US	Hard	(United States) Irina Falconi	(United States) Lindsay Lee-Waters (United States) Megan Moulton-Levy	6–1, 5–7, [4–10]
Win	3.	18 September 2011	ITF Redding, US	Hard	(United States) Yasmin Schnack	(United States) Brittany Augustine (United States) Whitney Jones	7–6^{(2)}, 4–6, [10–7]
Loss	3.	13 November 2011	Phoenix Tennis Classic, US	Hard	(United States) Yasmin Schnack	(United States) Jamie Hampton (Croatia) Ajla Tomljanović	6–3, 3–6, [6–10]
Win	4.	5 February 2012	Rancho Santa Fe Open, US	Hard	(United States) Yasmin Schnack	(Ukraine) Irina Buryachok (Ukraine) Elizaveta Ianchuk	7–6^{(4)}, 4–6, [10–8]
Win	5.	18 February 2012	ITF Surprise, US	Hard	(United States) Yasmin Schnack	(Romania) Mihaela Buzărnescu (Russia) Valeria Solovyeva	6–4, 6–3
Win	6.	28 April 2012	ITF Charlottesville, US	Clay	(United States) Yasmin Schnack	(Israel) Julia Glushko (Russia) Elena Bovina	6–2, 6–2
Loss	4.	2 June 2012	Sacramento Challenger, US	Hard	(United States) Kaitlyn Christian	(United States) Yasmin Schnack (United States) Asia Muhammad	3–6, 6–7
Loss	5.	22 September 2012	ITF Albuquerque, US	Hard	(United States) Irina Falconi	(United States) Yasmin Schnack (United States) Asia Muhammad	2–6, 6–1, [10–12]
Loss	6.	21 April 2013	Dothan Pro Classic, US	Hard	(United States) Irina Falconi	(United States) Julia Cohen (Germany) Tatjana Maria	4–6, 6–4, [9–11]
Win	7.	8 June 2013	Nottingham Trophy, UK	Grass	(United Kingdom) Nicola Slater	(Canada) Gabriela Dabrowski (Canada) Sharon Fichman	4–6, 6–3, [10–8]
Loss	7.	16 February 2014	Midland Tennis Classic, US	Hard (i)	(Canada) Sharon Fichman	(Georgia (country)) Anna Tatishvili (United Kingdom) Heather Watson	5–7, 7–5, [6–10]
Loss	8.	26 April 2014	ITF Charlottesville, US	Clay	(United States) Irina Falconi	(United States) Asia Muhammad (United States) Taylor Townsend	3–6, 1–6
Loss	9.	6 June 2014	Nottingham Trophy, UK	Grass	(Canada) Sharon Fichman	(United Kingdom) Jocelyn Rae (United Kingdom) Anna Smith	6–7^{(5)}, 6–4, [5–10]
Loss	10.	12 July 2014	Sacramento Challenger, US	Hard	(United States) Zoë Gwen Scandalis	(Russia) Daria Gavrilova (Australia) Storm Sanders	2–6, 1–6
Win	8.	3 August 2014	Vancouver Open, Canada	Hard	(United States) Asia Muhammad	(United States) Jamie Loeb (United States) Allie Will	6–3, 1–6, [10–8]
Loss	11.	28 September 2014	Las Vegas Open, US	Hard	(United States) Asia Muhammad	(Paraguay) Verónica Cepede Royg (Argentina) María Irigoyen	3–6, 7–5, [9–11]
Win	9.	19 October 2014	ITF Tampico, Mexico	Hard	(Croatia) Petra Martić	(Russia) Valeria Savinykh (Ukraine) Kateryna Bondarenko	3–6, 6–3, [10–2]
Win	10.	31 October 2014	Toronto Challenger, Canada	Hard (i)	(United States) Taylor Townsend	(Canada) Gabriela Dabrowski (Germany) Tatjana Maria	7–5, 4–6, [15–13]
Loss	12.	9 November 2014	Captiva Island Classic, US	Hard	(United States) Asia Muhammad	(Canada) Gabriela Dabrowski (United States) Anna Tatishvili	3–6, 3–6
Loss	13.	21 February 2015	ITF Surprise, US	Hard	(United Kingdom) Johanna Konta	(United States) Jacqueline Cako (United States) Kaitlyn Christian	4–6, 7–5, [7–10]
Win	11.	25 April 2015	Dothan Pro Classic, US	Clay	(United Kingdom) Johanna Konta	(Brazil) Paula Cristina Gonçalves (Czech Republic) Petra Krejsová	6–3, 6–4
Win	12.	3 May 2015	Charlottesville Open, US	Clay	(Canada) Françoise Abanda	(Ukraine) Olga Ianchuk (Russia) Irina Khromacheva	6–1, 6–3
Win	13.	10 May 2015	ITF Indian Harbour Beach, US	Clay	(United States) Taylor Townsend	(United States) Alexandra Stevenson (Russia) Angelina Gabueva	6–0, 6–1
Win	14.	22 August 2015	Vancouver Open, Canada	Hard	(United Kingdom) Johanna Konta	(Romania) Raluca Olaru (United States) Anna Tatishvili	7–6^{(5)}, 6–4
Loss	14.	24 October 2015	Challenger de Saguenay, Canada	Hard (i)	(Canada) Sharon Fichman	(Romania) Mihaela Buzărnescu (Poland) Justyna Jegiołka	6–7^{(6)}, 6–4, [7–10]
Win	15.	30 October 2015	Toronto Challenger, Canada	Hard (i)	(Canada) Sharon Fichman	(United States) Kristie Ahn (Hungary) Fanny Stollár	6–2, 6–7^{(6)}, [10–6]
Win	16.	31 January 2016	Maui Championships, US	Hard	(United States) Asia Muhammad	(United States) Jessica Pegula (United States) Taylor Townsend	6–2, 3–6, [10–6]
Loss	15.	8 May 2016	ITF Indian Harbour Beach, US	Clay	(United States) Jessica Pegula	(Israel) Julia Glushko (Russia) Alexandra Panova	5–7, 4–6
Loss	16.	4 June 2016	Eastbourne Trophy, UK	Grass	(United States) Asia Muhammad	(China) Yang Zhaoxuan (China) Zhang Kailin	6–7^{(5)}, 1–6
Win	17.	24 September 2016	ITF Albuquerque, US	Hard	(Netherlands) Michaëlla Krajicek	(Belgium) Elise Mertens (Luxembourg) Mandy Minella	6–2, 6–4
Win	18.	2 October 2016	Las Vegas Open, US	Hard	(Netherlands) Michaëlla Krajicek	(United States) Jamie Loeb (South Africa) Chanel Simmonds	7–5, 6–1
Loss	17.	17 September 2017	ITF Redding, US	Hard	(United Kingdom) Harriet Dart	(United Kingdom) Daneika Borthwick (Montenegro) Ana Veselinović	3–6, 4–6
Win	19.	21 October 2017	ITF Florence, US	Hard	(United States) Taylor Townsend	(United Kingdom) Tara Moore (Switzerland) Amra Sadiković	6–1, 6–2
Loss	18.	18 November 2017	ITF Norman, US	Hard	(United States) Caitlin Whoriskey	(United States) Chiara Scholl (Belgium) Tamaryn Hendler	6–3, 3–6, [6–10]
Loss	19.	4 February 2018	Midland Tennis Classic, US	Hard (i)	(United States) Jessica Pegula	(United States) Kaitlyn Christian (United States) Sabrina Santamaria	5–7, 6–4, [8–10]
Loss	20.	14 April 2018	ITF Indian Harbour Beach, US	Hard	(United States) Jessica Pegula	(Romania) Irina Bara (Spain) Sílvia Soler Espinosa	4–6, 2–6
Win	20.	23 June 2018	Ilkley Trophy, UK	Grass	(United States) Asia Muhammad	(Russia) Natela Dzalamidze (Kazakhstan) Galina Voskoboeva	4–6, 6–3, [10–1]
Win	21.	29 September 2018	ITF Templeton Pro, US	Hard	(United States) Asia Muhammad	(United States) Quinn Gleason (Brazil) Luisa Stefani	6–7^{(4)}, 6–2, [10–8]
Win	22.	3 November 2018	Toronto Challenger, Canada	Hard (i)	(Canada) Sharon Fichman	(Poland) Maja Chwalińska (Bulgaria) Elitsa Kostova	6–0, 6–4
Win	23.	11 November 2018	Las Vegas Open, US	Hard	(United States) Asia Muhammad	(United States) Sophie Chang (United States) Alexandra Mueller	6–3, 6–4
Win	24.	9 February 2020	Midland Tennis Classic, US	Hard (i)	(United States) Caroline Dolehide	(Russia) Valeria Savinykh (Belgium) Yanina Wickmayer	6–3, 6–4
