= 2019 Boar's Head Resort Women's Open =

- Date: 22–28 April 2019
- Edition: 18th
- Category: ITF Women's World Tennis Tour
- Prize money: $80,000
- Surface: Clay
- Location: Charlottesville, Virginia, United States

Champions

Singles
- (United States) Whitney Osuigwe

Doubles
- (United States) Asia Muhammad / (United States) Taylor Townsend
← 2018 ·	Boar's Head Resort Women's Open	· 2021 →

The 2019 Boar's Head Resort Women's Open was a professional tennis tournament played on outdoor clay courts. It was the eighteenth edition of the tournament which was part of the 2019 ITF Women's World Tennis Tour. It took place in Charlottesville, Virginia, United States between 22 and 28 April 2019.

== Singles main-draw entrants ==
=== Seeds ===
Country	Player	Rank^{1}	Seed
USA	Taylor Townsend	102	1
USA	Madison Brengle	97	2
UKR	Anhelina Kalinina	135	3
SLO	Kaja Juvan	141	4
AUS	Kimberly Birrell	164	5
USA	Francesca Di Lorenzo	166	6
USA	Claire Liu	167	7
USA	Whitney Osuigwe	190	8

- ^{1} Rankings are as of 15 April 2019.

=== Other entrants ===
The following players received wildcards into the singles main draw:

- (United States) Lorraine Guillermo
- (United States) Emma Navarro
- (United States) Natasha Subhash
- (United States) Taylor Townsend

The following player received entry using a protected ranking:

- (Czech Republic) Lucie Hradecká

The following player received entry using a junior exempt:

- (United States) Coco Gauff

The following players received entry from the qualifying draw:

- (New Zealand) Emily Fanning
- (United States) Sanaz Marand
- (United States) Rasheeda McAdoo
- (Australia) Abbie Myers
- (United States) Ingrid Neel
- (New Zealand) Erin Routliffe

== Champions ==
=== Singles ===
- (United States) Whitney Osuigwe def. (United States) Madison Brengle, 6–4, 1–6, 6–3

=== Doubles ===
- (United States) Asia Muhammad / (United States) Taylor Townsend def. (Czech Republic) Lucie Hradecká / (Poland) Katarzyna Kawa, 4–6, 7–5, [10–3]
