= 2022 Boar's Head Resort Women's Open =

Tennis tournament

- Date: 18–24 April 2022
- Edition: 20th
- Category: ITF Women's World Tennis Tour
- Prize money: $60,000
- Surface: Clay / Outdoor
- Location: Charlottesville, Virginia, United States

Champions

Singles
- (United States) Louisa Chirico

Doubles
- (United States) Sophie Chang / (United States) Angela Kulikov
← 2021 ·	Boar's Head Resort Women's Open	· 2023 →

The 2022 Boar's Head Resort Women's Open was a professional tennis tournament played on outdoor clay courts. It was the twentieth edition of the tournament which was part of the 2022 ITF Women's World Tennis Tour. It took place in Charlottesville, Virginia, United States between 18 and 24 April 2022.

== Singles main draw entrants ==
=== Seeds ===
Country	Player	Rank^{1}	Seed
ROU	Irina Bara	110	1
GER	Tatjana Maria	114	2
CHN	Wang Xiyu	150	3
USA	Alycia Parks	153	4
USA	Katie Volynets	154	5
ITA	Lucrezia Stefanini	155	6
JPN	Nao Hibino	167	7
USA	Caroline Dolehide	175	8

- ^{1} Rankings are as of 11 April 2022.

=== Other entrants ===
The following players received wildcards into the singles main draw:

- (United States) Elizabeth Mandlik
- (United States) Whitney Osuigwe
- (United States) Taylor Townsend
- (United States) Sachia Vickery

The following players received entry from the qualifying draw:

- (Canada) Cadence Brace
- (United States) Kayla Day
- (United States) Ellie Douglas
- (Germany) Jasmin Jebawy
- (Romania) Gabriela Lee
- (United States) Rasheeda McAdoo
- (United Kingdom) Tara Moore
- (Georgia (country)) Sofia Shapatava

== Champions ==
=== Singles ===
- (United States) Louisa Chirico def. (China) Wang Xiyu, 6–4, 6–3

=== Doubles ===
- (United States) Sophie Chang / (United States) Angela Kulikov def. (Greece) Valentini Grammatikopoulou / (United States) Alycia Parks, 2–6, 6–3, [10–4]
