= 2018 Boyd Tinsley Clay Court Classic – Doubles =

Doubles
- 2018 Boyd Tinsley Clay Court Classic

Final
- Champions: (United States) Sophie Chang (United States) Alexandra Mueller
- Runners-up: (United States) Ashley Kratzer (United States) Whitney Osuigwe
- Score: 3–6, 6–4, [10–7]

Events
Singles	Doubles
← 2017 ·	Boyd Tinsley Clay Court Classic	· 2019 →

Jovana Jakšić and Catalina Pella were the defending champions, but decided not to participate.

Sophie Chang and Alexandra Mueller won the title after defeating Ashley Kratzer and Whitney Osuigwe 3–6, 6–4, [10–7] in the final.

== Seeds ==
1. (Romania) Irina Bara / (Colombia) Mariana Duque Mariño (semifinals)
2. (Chile) Alexa Guarachi / (New Zealand) Erin Routliffe (quarterfinals)
3. (United States) Sophie Chang / (United States) Alexandra Mueller (champions)
4. (Brazil) Paula Cristina Gonçalves / (United States) Sanaz Marand (first round)

== Draw ==
=== Key ===
- Q = Qualifier
- WC = Wild card
- LL = Lucky loser
- Alt = Alternate
- SE = Special exempt
- PR = Protected ranking
- ITF = ITF entry
- JE = Junior exempt
- w/o = Walkover
- r = Retired
- d = Defaulted
- SR = Special ranking

=== Draw ===
First round
1	(Romania) I Bara (Colombia) M Duque Mariño	6	6
(The Bahamas) K Cartwright (United States) K Pierre-Louis	3	1
WC	(United States) A Smith (United States) N Subhash	6	6
(United States) M Mateas (United States) R Yurovsky	2	4
3	(United States) S Chang (United States) A Mueller	6	6
(United States) L Chirico (United States) F Di Lorenzo	3	3
(Canada) P Januskova (Japan) R Ozaki	4	6	[7]
(Italy) C Rosatello (Mexico) AS Sánchez	6	3	[10]
(United States) V Duval (United States) J Loeb	6	4	[10]
(United States) Q Gleason (United States) A Weinhold	2	6	[8]
(United States) A Kratzer (United States) W Osuigwe	6	6
4	(Brazil) PC Gonçalves (United States) S Marand	3	4
(Romania) J Cristian (United States) K Day	1	3
(United States) I Neel (United States) M Sanchez	6	6
(United States) R McAdoo (United States) K Stewart	6	4	[7]
2	(Chile) A Guarachi (New Zealand) E Routliffe	2	6	[10]

Quarterfinals
1	(Romania) I Bara (Colombia) M Duque Mariño	2	7	[10]
WC	(United States) A Smith (United States) N Subhash	6	5	[5]
3	(United States) S Chang (United States) A Mueller	7	6
(Italy) C Rosatello (Mexico) AS Sánchez	5	2
(United States) V Duval (United States) J Loeb	6	6^{2}	[10]
(United States) A Kratzer (United States) W Osuigwe	3	7^{7}	[12]
(United States) I Neel (United States) M Sanchez	6	1	[20]
2	(Chile) A Guarachi (New Zealand) E Routliffe	2	6	[18]

Semifinals
1	(Romania) I Bara (Colombia) M Duque Mariño	6	4	[4]
3	(United States) S Chang (United States) A Mueller	1	6	[10]
(United States) A Kratzer (United States) W Osuigwe	6	2	[12]
(United States) I Neel (United States) M Sanchez	4	6	[10]

Final
3	(United States) S Chang (United States) A Mueller	3	6	[10]
(United States) A Kratzer (United States) W Osuigwe	6	4	[7]
