= 2023 Boar's Head Resort Women's Open =

Tennis tournament

- Date: 24–30 April 2023
- Edition: 21st
- Category: ITF Women's World Tennis Tour
- Prize money: $60,000
- Surface: Clay / Outdoor
- Location: Charlottesville, United States

Champions

Singles
- (United States) Emma Navarro

Doubles
- (United States) Sophie Chang / (China) Yuan Yue
← 2022 ·	Boar's Head Resort Women's Open	· 2024 →

The 2023 Boar's Head Resort Women's Open was a professional tennis tournament played on outdoor clay courts. It was the twenty-first edition of the tournament, which was part of the 2023 ITF Women's World Tennis Tour. It took place in Charlottesville, Virginia, United States, between 24 and 30 April 2023.

== Champions ==
=== Singles ===
- (United States) Emma Navarro def. (United States) Ashlyn Krueger, 6–1, 6–1

=== Doubles ===
- (United States) Sophie Chang / (China) Yuan Yue def. (Japan) Nao Hibino / (Hungary) Fanny Stollár, 6–3, 6–3

== Singles main draw entrants ==
=== Seeds ===
Country	Player	Rank	Seed
	Diana Shnaider	88	1
JPN	Nao Hibino	114	2
USA	Emma Navarro	121	3
CHN	Yuan Yue	125	4
USA	Caroline Dolehide	152	5
USA	Ashlyn Krueger	155	6
ARG	María Lourdes Carlé	162	7
USA	Kayla Day	181	8

- Rankings are as of 17 April 2023.

=== Other entrants ===
The following players received wildcards into the singles main draw:

- (United States) Hailey Baptiste
- (United States) Francesca Di Lorenzo
- (United States) Whitney Osuigwe
- (Ukraine) Yulia Starodubtseva

The following player received entry into the singles main draw using a junior exempt:

- (United States) Liv Hovde

The following player received entry into the singles main draw through a special exempt:

- (United States) Makenna Jones

The following players received entry from the qualifying draw:

- (Canada) Kayla Cross
- (United States) Allie Kiick
- (Chinese Taipei) Liang En-shuo
- (United States) Maria Mateas
- (United States) Grace Min
- (Japan) Yuki Naito
- (Australia) Astra Sharma
- (Mexico) Renata Zarazúa
