= 2019 Boar's Head Resort Women's Open – Singles =

Singles
- 2019 Boar's Head Resort Women's Open

Final
- Champion: (United States) Whitney Osuigwe
- Runner-up: (United States) Madison Brengle
- Score: 6–4, 1–6, 6–3

Events
| Singles | Doubles |
| ← 2018 · | Boar's Head Resort Women's Open | · 2021 → |

Mariana Duque Mariño was the defending champion from the 2018 Boar's Head Resort Women's Open tennis tournament, but she had retired from professional tennis earlier in the year.

Whitney Osuigwe won the title, defeating Madison Brengle in the final, 6–4, 1–6, 6–3.

== Seeds ==
1. (United States) Taylor Townsend (quarterfinals)
2. (United States) Madison Brengle (final)
3. (Ukraine) Anhelina Kalinina (quarterfinals)
4. (Slovenia) Kaja Juvan (semifinals)
5. (Australia) Kimberly Birrell (first round)
6. (United States) Francesca Di Lorenzo (first round)
7. (United States) Claire Liu (first round)
8. (United States) Whitney Osuigwe (champion)

== Draw ==
=== Key ===
- Q = Qualifier
- WC = Wild card
- LL = Lucky loser
- Alt = Alternate
- SE = Special exempt
- PR = Protected ranking
- ITF = ITF entry
- JE = Junior exempt
- w/o = Walkover
- r = Retired
- d = Defaulted
- SR = Special ranking

=== Finals ===
Semifinals
8 | (United States) Whitney Osuigwe | 3 | 7 | 7^{7}
(Poland) Katarzyna Kawa | 6 | 5 | 6^{1}
4 | (Slovenia) Kaja Juvan | 6 | 3 | 4
2 | (United States) Madison Brengle | 4 | 6 | 6

Final
8 | (United States) Whitney Osuigwe | 6 | 1 | 6
2 | (United States) Madison Brengle | 4 | 6 | 3

=== Top half ===
First round
1/WC | (United States) T Townsend | 7 | 6
Q | (United States) S Marand | 5 | 1
Q | (United States) I Neel | 1 | 6 | 0
(United States) C Dolehide | 6 | 3 | 6
(Australia) Z Hives | 6 | 7^{7}
JE | (United States) C Gauff | 4 | 6^{3}
(United States) K Day | 0 | 4
8 | (United States) W Osuigwe | 6 | 6
3 | (Ukraine) A Kalinina | 6 | 6
Q | (New Zealand) E Routliffe | 2 | 4
WC | (United States) N Subhash | 6 | 6^{3} | 3
(United States) L Chirico | 3 | 7^{7} | 6
(Poland) K Kawa | 6 | 4 | 6
Q | (United States) R McAdoo | 4 | 6 | 2
PR | (Czech Republic) L Hradecká | 6 | 6
5 | (Australia) K Birrell | 0 | 1

Second round
1/WC | (United States) T Townsend | 6 | 6
(United States) C Dolehide | 2 | 3
(Australia) Z Hives | 2 | 5
8 | (United States) W Osuigwe | 6 | 7
3 | (Ukraine) A Kalinina | 6 | 6
(United States) L Chirico | 3 | 3
(Poland) K Kawa | 7^{10} | 7
PR | (Czech Republic) L Hradecká | 6^{8} | 5

Quarterfinals
1/WC | (United States) T Townsend | 3 | 6 | 3
8 | (United States) W Osuigwe | 6 | 2 | 6
3 | (Ukraine) A Kalinina | 6 | 3 | 4
(Poland) K Kawa | 2 | 6 | 6

Semifinals
8 | (United States) W Osuigwe | 3 | 7 | 7^{7}
(Poland) K Kawa | 6 | 5 | 6^{1}

=== Bottom half ===
First round
6 | (United States) F Di Lorenzo | 2 | 6 | 3
(United States) C McNally | 6 | 0 | 6
(Poland) U Radwańska | 2 | 2
(Bulgaria) S Karatantcheva | 6 | 6
Q | (New Zealand) E Fanning | 1 | 7 | 7^{7}
WC | (United States) L Guillermo | 6 | 5 | 6^{4}
WC | (United States) E Navarro | 1 | 3
4 | (Slovenia) K Juvan | 6 | 6
7 | (United States) C Liu | 4 | 6 | 4
Q | (Australia) A Myers | 6 | 1 | 6
(United States) Q Gleason | 6 | 5 | 6
(Australia) D Aiava | 4 | 7 | 4
(United States) A Muhammad | 6 | 6
(Australia) E Perez | 4 | 1
(Australia) L Cabrera | 1 | 6 | 6^{3}
2 | (United States) M Brengle | 6 | 3 | 7^{7}

Second round
(United States) C McNally | 7 | 4 | 6
(Bulgaria) S Karatantcheva | 5 | 6 | 4
Q | (New Zealand) E Fanning | 0 | 0
4 | (Slovenia) K Juvan | 6 | 6
Q | (Australia) A Myers | 5 | 5
(United States) Q Gleason | 7 | 7
(United States) A Muhammad | 1 | 1
2 | (United States) M Brengle | 6 | 6

Quarterfinals
(United States) C McNally | 5 | 1
4 | (Slovenia) K Juvan | 7 | 6
(United States) Q Gleason | 2 | 1
2 | (United States) M Brengle | 6 | 6

Semifinals
4 | (Slovenia) K Juvan | 6 | 3 | 4
2 | (United States) M Brengle | 4 | 6 | 6
