= 2018 Boyd Tinsley Clay Court Classic =

- Date: 23–29 April
- Edition: 17th
- Category: ITF Women's Circuit
- Prize money: $80,000
- Surface: Clay
- Location: Charlottesville, United States

Champions

Singles
- (Colombia) Mariana Duque Mariño

Doubles
- (United States) Sophie Chang / (United States) Alexandra Mueller
| ← 2017 · | Boyd Tinsley Clay Court Classic | · 2019 → |

The 2018 Boyd Tinsley Clay Court Classic was a professional tennis tournament played on outdoor clay courts. It was the seventeenth edition of the tournament and was part of the 2018 ITF Women's Circuit. It took place in Charlottesville, United States, on 23–29 April 2018.

== Singles main draw entrants ==
=== Seeds ===
| Country | Player | Rank^{1} | Seed |
|---|---|---|---|
| USA | Madison Brengle | 80 | 1 |
| USA | Jennifer Brady | 85 | 2 |
| USA | Taylor Townsend | 108 | 3 |
| COL | Mariana Duque Mariño | 125 | 4 |
| UKR | Anhelina Kalinina | 150 | 5 |
| ROU | Irina Bara | 151 | 6 |
| AUS | Lizette Cabrera | 159 | 7 |
| USA | Jamie Loeb | 163 | 8 |

- ^{1} Rankings as of 16 April 2018.

=== Other entrants ===
The following players received a wildcard into the singles main draw:

- (United States) Julia Elbaba
- (United States) Allie Kiick
- (United States) Katerina Stewart

The following players received entry from the qualifying draw:

- (United States) Sophie Chang
- (Japan) Mari Osaka
- (Italy) Camilla Rosatello
- (Poland) Iga Świątek

The following player received entry as a Lucky Loser:

- (Mexico) Ana Sofía Sánchez

== Champions ==
=== Singles ===
- (Colombia) Mariana Duque Mariño def. (Ukraine) Anhelina Kalinina, 0–6, 6–1, 6–2

=== Doubles ===
- (United States) Sophie Chang / (United States) Alexandra Mueller def. (United States) Ashley Kratzer / (United States) Whitney Osuigwe, 3–6, 6–4, [10–7]
