= 2023 Boar's Head Resort Women's Open – Singles =

Singles
- 2023 Boar's Head Resort Women's Open

Final
- Champion: (United States) Emma Navarro
- Runner-up: (United States) Ashlyn Krueger
- Score: 6–1, 6–1

Events
Singles	Doubles
← 2022 ·	Boar's Head Resort Women's Open	· 2024 →

Louisa Chirico was the defending champion but lost in the first round to Maria Mateas.

Emma Navarro won the title, defeating Ashlyn Krueger in the final, 6–1, 6–1.

== Seeds ==
1. Diana Shnaider (quarterfinals)
2. (Japan) Nao Hibino (first round)
3. (United States) Emma Navarro (champion)
4. (China) Yuan Yue (second round)
5. (United States) Caroline Dolehide (semifinals)
6. (United States) Ashlyn Krueger (final)
7. (Argentina) María Lourdes Carlé (quarterfinals)
8. (United States) Kayla Day (quarterfinals)

== Draw ==
=== Key ===
- Q = Qualifier
- WC = Wild card
- LL = Lucky loser
- Alt = Alternate
- SE = Special exempt
- PR = Protected ranking
- ITF = ITF entry
- JE = Junior exempt
- w/o = Walkover
- r = Retired
- d = Defaulted
- SR = Special ranking

=== Finals ===
Semifinals
6	(United States) Ashlyn Krueger	6	7
5	(United States) Caroline Dolehide	4	5
3	(United States) Emma Navarro	6	6
Q	(United States) Grace Min	0	1

Final
6	(United States) Ashlyn Krueger	1	1
3	(United States) Emma Navarro	6	6

=== Top half ===
First round
1	D Shnaider	7	6
WC	(United States) W Osuigwe	5	3
(United States) R Anderson	3	0
(United States) A Li	6	6
(United States) J Loeb	3	6^{2}
(Romania) G Lee	6	7^{7}
WC	(United States) F Di Lorenzo	3	2
6	(United States) A Krueger	6	6
4	(China) Y Yuan	7	6
Q	(Canada) K Cross	5	3
(United Kingdom) Y Miyazaki	3	1
Q	(Mexico) R Zarazúa	6	6
Q	(Australia) A Sharma	3	7^{7}	3
(Mexico) M Zacarías	6	6^{3}	6
JE	(United States) L Hovde	6	4	1
5	(United States) C Dolehide	3	6	6

Second round
1	D Shnaider	4	6	6
(United States) A Li	6	4	3
(Romania) G Lee	2	2
6	(United States) A Krueger	6	6
4	(China) Y Yuan	6	0	4
Q	(Mexico) R Zarazúa	3	6	6
(Mexico) M Zacarías	0	2
5	(United States) C Dolehide	6	6

Quarterfinals
1	D Shnaider	2	6	2
6	(United States) A Krueger	6	4	6
Q	(Mexico) R Zarazúa	3	3
5	(United States) C Dolehide	6	6

Semifinals
6	(United States) A Krueger	6	7
5	(United States) C Dolehide	4	5

=== Bottom half ===
First round
8	(United States) K Day	6	6
SE	(United States) M Jones	2	2
Q	(United States) A Kiick	6	3	6
WC	(United States) H Baptiste	0	6	3
Q	(United States) M Mateas	6	6
(United States) L Chirico	4	3
(United States) R Montgomery	0	0
3	(United States) E Navarro	6	6
7	(Argentina) ML Carlé	6	6
Q	(Japan) Y Naito	4	2
(United States) S Chang	5	2
WC	(Ukraine) Y Starodubtseva	7	6
Q	(Chinese Taipei) E-s Liang	2	6	6
(Poland) K Kawa	6	2	3
Q	(United States) G Min	7^{7}	3	6
2	(Japan) N Hibino	6^{5}	6	3

Second round
8	(United States) K Day	6	6
Q	(United States) A Kiick	1	1
Q	(United States) M Mateas	4	3
3	(United States) E Navarro	6	6
7	(Argentina) ML Carlé	6	7
WC	(Ukraine) Y Starodubtseva	2	5
Q	(Chinese Taipei) E-s Liang	6	6^{2}	3
Q	(United States) G Min	3	7^{7}	6

Quarterfinals
8	(United States) K Day	3	1
3	(United States) E Navarro	6	6
7	(Argentina) ML Carlé	4	6	3
Q	(United States) G Min	6	1	6

Semifinals
3	(United States) E Navarro	6	6
Q	(United States) G Min	0	1
