= 2025 Boar's Head Resort Women's Open – Doubles =

Doubles
- 2025 Boar's Head Resort Women's Open

Final
- Champions: Maria Kozyreva; Iryna Shymanovich
- Runners-up: (Canada) Kayla Cross (Australia) Petra Hule
- Score: 7–5, 7–5

Events
Singles	Doubles
- Boar's Head Resort Women's Open

Emily Appleton and Quinn Gleason were the defending champions but did not compete in this event.

Maria Kozyreva and Iryna Shymanovich won the title, defeating Kayla Cross and Petra Hule in the final, 7–5, 7–5.

== Seeds ==
1. (Netherlands) Isabelle Haverlag / (Ukraine) Valeriya Strakhova (semifinals)
2. (Romania) Irina Maria Bara / (Brazil) Laura Pigossi (first round)
3. Maria Kozyreva / Iryna Shymanovich (champions)
4. (Canada) Kayla Cross / (Australia) Petra Hule (final)

== Draw ==
Key

- Q = Qualifier
- WC = Wild card
- LL = Lucky loser
- Alt = Alternate
- ITF = ITF entry
- PR = Protected ranking
- SR = Special ranking
- SE = Special exempt
- JE = Junior exempt
- JR = Junior Accelerator Programme entrant
- CO = College Accelerator Programme entrant
- NG = Next Gen Accelerator Program entrant
- w/o = Walkover
- r = Retired
- d = Defaulted

First round
1	(Netherlands) I Haverlag (Ukraine) V Strakhova	6	7
(United States) J Aney (India) R Bhatia	2	5
(United States) A Reami (United States) E Schoppe	4	4
(United States) V Osuigwe (United States) W Osuigwe	6	6
4	(Canada) K Cross (Australia) P Hule	6	6
(United States) I Barrera Aguirre (Mexico) S León	4	3
(United States) M Jones (United States) A Kulikov	7	6^{6}	[10]
(United States) H Giavara (United States) J Loeb	5	7^{8}	[5]
(United States) C Liu (Australia) A Osborne	6	6
(Bulgaria) L Karatancheva (United States) A Rogers	4	1
(United States) L Ma (United States) K Miller	1	2
3	M Kozyreva; I Shymanovich	6	6
(United Kingdom) M Brooks (United Kingdom) T Moore	2	2
(United States) I Jovic (United States) A Urhobo	6	6
(United States) M Mateas (United States) A Smith	6	6
2	(Romania) IM Bara (Brazil) L Pigossi	3	3

Quarterfinals
1	(Netherlands) I Haverlag (Ukraine) V Strakhova	6	6
(United States) V Osuigwe (United States) W Osuigwe	3	3
4	(Canada) K Cross (Australia) P Hule	7	3	[10]
(United States) M Jones (United States) A Kulikov	5	6	[8]
(United States) C Liu (Australia) A Osborne	1	6^{1}
3	M Kozyreva; I Shymanovich	6	7^{7}
(United States) I Jovic (United States) A Urhobo	6	6^{5}	[8]
(United States) M Mateas (United States) A Smith	4	7^{7}	[10]

Semifinals
1	(Netherlands) I Haverlag (Ukraine) V Strakhova	6	4	[8]
4	(Canada) K Cross (Australia) P Hule	0	6	[10]
3	M Kozyreva; I Shymanovich	4	6	[10]
(United States) M Mateas (United States) A Smith	6	2	[8]

Final
4	(Canada) K Cross (Australia) P Hule	5	5
3	M Kozyreva; I Shymanovich	7	7
