= 2019 Boar's Head Resort Women's Open – Doubles =

Doubles
- 2019 Boar's Head Resort Women's Open

Final
- Champions: (United States) Asia Muhammad (United States) Taylor Townsend
- Runners-up: (Czech Republic) Lucie Hradecká (Poland) Katarzyna Kawa
- Score: 4–6, 7–5, [10–3]

Events
Singles	Doubles
← 2018 ·	Boar's Head Resort Women's Open	· 2021 →

Sophie Chang and Alexandra Mueller were the defending champions of the 2018 Boar's Head Resor Women's Open tennis tournament, but chose not to participate.

Asia Muhammad and Taylor Townsend won the title, defeating Lucie Hradecká and Katarzyna Kawa in the final, 4–6, 7–5, [10–3].

== Seeds ==
1. (United States) Asia Muhammad / (United States) Taylor Townsend (champions)
2. (United States) Quinn Gleason / (United States) Ingrid Neel (first round)
3. (United States) Caroline Dolehide / (Australia) Ellen Perez (first round)
4. (Czech Republic) Lucie Hradecká / (Poland) Katarzyna Kawa (final)

== Draw ==
=== Key ===
- Q = Qualifier
- WC = Wild card
- LL = Lucky loser
- Alt = Alternate
- SE = Special exempt
- PR = Protected ranking
- ITF = ITF entry
- JE = Junior exempt
- w/o = Walkover
- r = Retired
- d = Defaulted
- SR = Special ranking

=== Draw ===
First round
1	(United States) A Muhammad (United States) T Townsend	6	6
(United States) J Elie (New Zealand) E Fanning	2	0
(United States) S León (United States) A Riley	2	1
(United States) S Marand (United States) C Whoriskey	6	6
3	(United States) C Dolehide (Australia) E Perez	6^{2}	4
(United States) C Gauff (United States) R McAdoo	7^{7}	6
(United States) L Guillermo (Japan) A Okuno	6^{6}	1
(Australia) K Birrell (Australia) L Cabrera	7^{8}	6
(United States) C Liu (United States) N Subhash	2	3
(United States) C McNally (United States) W Osuigwe	6	6
WC	(United States) V Glozman (United States) Ch Gullickson	6^{6}	2
4	(Czech Republic) L Hradecká (Poland) K Kawa	7^{8}	6
(United States) F Di Lorenzo (New Zealand) E Routliffe	6	6
WC	(United States) M Kelley (Colombia) S Múnera Sánchez	1	1
(United States) K Day (Ukraine) A Kalinina	7	6
2	(United States) Q Gleason (United States) I Neel	5	2

Quarterfinals
1	(United States) A Muhammad (United States) T Townsend	6	6
(United States) S Marand (United States) C Whoriskey	3	4
(United States) C Gauff (United States) R McAdoo	7	6
(Australia) K Birrell (Australia) L Cabrera	5	2
(United States) C McNally (United States) W Osuigwe	2	3
4	(Czech Republic) L Hradecká (Poland) K Kawa	6	6
(United States) F Di Lorenzo (New Zealand) E Routliffe	2	5
(United States) K Day (Ukraine) A Kalinina	6	7

Semifinals
1	(United States) A Muhammad (United States) T Townsend	7	6
(United States) C Gauff (United States) R McAdoo	5	3
4	(Czech Republic) L Hradecká (Poland) K Kawa	6	6^{3}	[10]
(United States) K Day (Ukraine) A Kalinina	2	7^{7}	[7]

Final
1	(United States) A Muhammad (United States) T Townsend	4	7	[10]
4	(Czech Republic) L Hradecká (Poland) K Kawa	6	5	[3]
