= 2022 Boar's Head Resort Women's Open – Doubles =

Doubles
- 2022 Boar's Head Resort Women's Open

Final
- Champions: (United States) Sophie Chang (United States) Angela Kulikov
- Runners-up: (Greece) Valentini Grammatikopoulou (United States) Alycia Parks
- Score: 2–6, 6–3, [10–4]

Events
| Singles | Doubles |
| ← 2021 · | Boar's Head Resort Women's Open | · 2023 → |

Anna Danilina and Arina Rodionova were the defending champions but chose not to participate.

Sophie Chang and Angela Kulikov won the title, defeating Valentini Grammatikopoulou and Alycia Parks in the final, 2–6, 6–3, [10–4].

== Seeds ==
1. (United States) Emina Bektas / (United Kingdom) Tara Moore (quarterfinals)
2. (Hungary) Tímea Babos / (Japan) Nao Hibino (semifinals)
3. (Greece) Valentini Grammatikopoulou / (United States) Alycia Parks (final)
4. (United States) Sophie Chang / (United States) Angela Kulikov (champions)

== Draw ==
=== Key ===
- Q = Qualifier
- WC = Wild card
- LL = Lucky loser
- Alt = Alternate
- SE = Special exempt
- PR = Protected ranking
- ITF = ITF entry
- JE = Junior exempt
- w/o = Walkover
- r = Retired
- d = Defaulted
- SR = Special ranking

=== Draw ===
First round
1 | (United States) E Bektas (United Kingdom) T Moore | 6 | 6
(Argentina) ML Carlé (United States) E Mandlik | 1 | 4
(United States) A Rogers (United States) C Rosca | 6 | 6
(Canada) B Fernandez (Germany) J Jebawy | 2 | 1
4 | (United States) S Chang (United States) A Kulikov | 6 | 6
(United States) E Oosterhout (United States) M Schmidt | 2 | 3
(Australia) S Mendez (United States) K Stewart | 6 | 7^{10}
(United States) D Hewitt (United States) A Reami | 2 | 6^{8}
(United States) R McAdoo (United States) C Van Nguyen | 1 | 4
(United States) K Day (United States) W Osuigwe | 6 | 6
(United States) R Anderson (United States) F Di Lorenzo | 4 | 4
3 | (Greece) V Grammatikopoulou (United States) A Parks | 6 | 6
(United States) L Chirico (United States) J Loeb | 4 | 6 | [7]
O Govortsova (Georgia (country)) S Shapatava | 6 | 4 | [10]
(Romania) G Lee (Mexico) M Zacarías | 3 | 1
2 | (Hungary) T Babos (Japan) N Hibino | 6 | 6

Quarterfinals
1 | (United States) E Bektas (United Kingdom) T Moore | 5 | 5
(United States) A Rogers (United States) C Rosca | 7 | 7
4 | (United States) S Chang (United States) A Kulikov | 6 | 6
(Australia) S Mendez (United States) K Stewart | 3 | 3
(United States) K Day (United States) W Osuigwe | 3 | 1
3 | (Greece) V Grammatikopoulou (United States) A Parks | 6 | 6
O Govortsova (Georgia (country)) S Shapatava | 4 | 5
2 | (Hungary) T Babos (Japan) N Hibino | 6 | 7

Semifinals
(United States) A Rogers (United States) C Rosca | 2 | 3
4 | (United States) S Chang (United States) A Kulikov | 6 | 6
3 | (Greece) V Grammatikopoulou (United States) A Parks | 6 | 4 | [10]
2 | (Hungary) T Babos (Japan) N Hibino | 2 | 6 | [4]

Final
4 | (United States) S Chang (United States) A Kulikov | 2 | 6 | [10]
3 | (Greece) V Grammatikopoulou (United States) A Parks | 6 | 3 | [4]
