= 2025 Boar's Head Resort Women's Open – Singles =

Singles
- 2025 Boar's Head Resort Women's Open

Final
- Champion: (United States) Iva Jovic
- Runner-up: (Romania) Irina Maria Bara
- Score: 6–0, 6–1

Events
Singles	Doubles
- Boar's Head Resort Women's Open

Louisa Chirico was the 2024 champion, but she did not compete in the 2025 event.

American Iva Jovic won the title, defeating Irina Maria Bara of Romania in the final, 6–0, 6–1.

== Seeds ==
1. (United States) Iva Jovic (champion)
2. (Australia) Arina Rodionova (second round)
3. (United States) Hanna Chang (quarterfinals)
4. (Brazil) Laura Pigossi (semifinals)
5. (United States) Lauren Davis (quarterfinals)
6. (United States) Whitney Osuigwe (quarterfinals)
7. (Australia) Astra Sharma (semifinals)
8. Iryna Shymanovich (quarterfinals)

== Draw ==
Key

- Q = Qualifier
- WC = Wild card
- LL = Lucky loser
- Alt = Alternate
- ITF = ITF entry
- PR = Protected ranking
- SR = Special ranking
- SE = Special exempt
- JE = Junior exempt
- JR = Junior Accelerator Programme entrant
- CO = College Accelerator Programme entrant
- NG = Next Gen Accelerator Program entrant
- w/o = Walkover
- r = Retired
- d = Defaulted

=== Finals ===
Semifinals
1	(United States) Iva Jovic	6	6^{8}	6
4	(Brazil) Laura Pigossi	4	7^{10}	4
7	(Australia) Astra Sharma	4	2
(Romania) Irina Maria Bara	6	6

Final
1	(United States) Iva Jovic	6	6
(Romania) Irina Maria Bara	0	1

=== Top half ===
First round
1	(United States) I Jovic	6	6
(United States) C Liu	4	1
(Sweden) K Rinaldo Persson	4	6	5
WC	(United States) C McNally	6	0	7
WC	(Canada) A Xu	4	5
Q	(United States) V Osuigwe	6	7
(United States) A Urhobo	3	6	1
6	(United States) W Osuigwe	6	3	6
4	(Brazil) L Pigossi	4	6	7
(United States) E Kalieva	6	3	5
Q	(Bulgaria) L Karatancheva	6	6^{2}	3
(Canada) C Brace	4	7^{7}	6
(Canada) K Cross	6	6
Q	(United States) A Reami	1	2
(United States) M Stoiana	3	3
8	I Shymanovich	6	6

Second round
1	(United States) I Jovic	6	6
WC	(United States) C McNally	1	1
Q	(United States) V Osuigwe	3	1
6	(United States) W Osuigwe	6	6
4	(Brazil) L Pigossi	w/o
(Canada) C Brace
(Canada) K Cross	2	4
8	I Shymanovich	6	6

Quarterfinals
1	(United States) I Jovic	6	6
6	(United States) W Osuigwe	2	4
4	(Brazil) L Pigossi	4	6	6
8	I Shymanovich	6	1	4

Semifinals
1	(United States) I Jovic	6	6^{8}	6
4	(Brazil) L Pigossi	4	7^{10}	4

=== Bottom half ===
First round
7	(Australia) A Sharma	6	6
(United States) A Rogers	4	0
Q	(United States) H Giavara	4	7^{7}	3
(Ukraine) V Strakhova	6	6^{5}	6
WC	(United States) J Loeb	1	4
WC	(United States) M Sieg	6	6
Q	(United States) J Aney	2	0
3	(United States) H Chang	6	6
5	(United States) L Davis	6	6^{4}	6
Q	M Kozyreva	3	7^{7}	4
Q	(Greece) M Matoula	6	2	7
Q	(United States) V Hu	4	6	5
(Canada) C Zhao	0	0
(Romania) IM Bara	6	6
(United States) M Mateas	6^{4}	3
2	(Australia) A Rodionova	7^{7}	6

Second round
7	(Australia) A Sharma	3	6	6
(Ukraine) V Strakhova	6	3	2
WC	(United States) M Sieg	1	0^{r}
3	(United States) H Chang	6	1
5	(United States) L Davis	6	6
Q	(Greece) M Matoula	1	2
(Romania) IM Bara	6	4	6
2	(Australia) A Rodionova	1	6	2

Quarterfinals
7	(Australia) A Sharma	6	6
3	(United States) H Chang	3	1
5	(United States) L Davis	3	6^{2}
(Romania) IM Bara	6	7^{7}

Semifinals
7	(Australia) A Sharma	4	2
(Romania) IM Bara	6	6
