= 2017 Boyd Tinsley Women's Clay Court Classic =

- Date: 24–30 April
- Edition: 16th
- Category: ITF Women's Circuit
- Prize money: $60,000
- Surface: Clay
- Location: Charlottesville, United States

Champions

Singles
- (United States) Madison Brengle

Doubles
- (Serbia) Jovana Jakšić / (Argentina) Catalina Pella
← 2016 ·	Boyd Tinsley Women's Clay Court Classic	· 2018 →

The 2017 Boyd Tinsley Women's Clay Court Classic was a professional tennis tournament played on outdoor clay courts. It was the sixteenth edition of the tournament and part of the 2017 ITF Women's Circuit, offering a total of $60,000 in prize money. It took place in Charlottesville, United States, from 24–30 April 2017.

== Singles main draw entrants ==
=== Seeds ===
Country	Player	Rank^{1}	Seed
USA	Madison Brengle	100	1
BUL	Elitsa Kostova	146	2
USA	Kayla Day	150	3
USA	Jamie Loeb	159	4
AUT	Barbara Haas	171	5
AUS	Lizette Cabrera	177	6
USA	Sofia Kenin	189	7
HUN	Fanny Stollár	212	8

- ^{1} Rankings as of 17 April 2017

=== Other entrants ===
The following players received wildcards into the singles main draw:

- (United States) Claire Liu
- (United States) Maria Sanchez
- (Croatia) Ajla Tomljanović

The following player received entry into the singles main draw by a protected ranking:

- (Ukraine) Anhelina Kalinina

The following players received entry from the qualifying draw:

- (United States) Robin Anderson
- (Belgium) Elyne Boeykens
- (Ukraine) Elizaveta Ianchuk
- (Canada) Carol Zhao

The following player received entry as a Lucky Loser:

- (United States) Julia Elbaba

== Champions ==
=== Singles ===
- (United States) Madison Brengle def. (United States) Caroline Dolehide, 6–4, 6–3

=== Doubles ===
- (Serbia) Jovana Jakšić / (Argentina) Catalina Pella def. (United States) Madison Brengle / (United States) Danielle Collins, 6–4, 7–6^{(7–5)}
