= 2018 Boyd Tinsley Clay Court Classic – Singles =

Singles
- 2018 Boyd Tinsley Clay Court Classic

Final
- Champion: (Colombia) Mariana Duque Mariño
- Runner-up: (Ukraine) Anhelina Kalinina
- Score: 0–6, 6–1, 6–2

Events
Singles	Doubles
← 2017 ·	Boyd Tinsley Clay Court Classic	· 2019 →

Madison Brengle was the defending champion but lost in the second round to Mari Osaka.

Mariana Duque Mariño won the title after defeating Anhelina Kalinina 0–6, 6–1, 6–2 in the final.

== Seeds ==
1. (United States) Madison Brengle (second round)
2. (United States) Jennifer Brady (semifinals)
3. (United States) Taylor Townsend (semifinals)
4. (Colombia) Mariana Duque Mariño (champion)
5. (Ukraine) Anhelina Kalinina (final)
6. (Romania) Irina Bara (first round)
7. (Australia) Lizette Cabrera (first round)
8. (United States) Jamie Loeb (first round)

== Draw ==
=== Key ===
- Q = Qualifier
- WC = Wild card
- LL = Lucky loser
- Alt = Alternate
- SE = Special exempt
- PR = Protected ranking
- ITF = ITF entry
- JE = Junior exempt
- w/o = Walkover
- r = Retired
- d = Defaulted
- SR = Special ranking

=== Finals ===
Semifinals
5	(Ukraine) Anhelina Kalinina	6	7^{7}
3	(United States) Taylor Townsend	3	6^{5}
4	(Colombia) Mariana Duque Mariño	6	6
2	(United States) Jennifer Brady	4	2

Final
5	(Ukraine) Anhelina Kalinina	6	1	2
4	(Colombia) Mariana Duque Mariño	0	6	6

=== Top half ===
First round
1	(United States) M Brengle	7	6
(United States) M Sanchez	5	2
Q	(Japan) M Osaka	1	7^{9}	6
(Canada) K Sebov	6	6^{7}	1
(United States) K Day	2	2
LL	(Mexico) AS Sánchez	6	6
WC	(United States) J Elbaba	4	1
5	(Ukraine) A Kalinina	6	6
3	(United States) T Townsend	6	6
(United States) UM Arconada	4	3
(Romania) J Cristian	5	6^{5}
(Japan) R Ozaki	7	7^{7}
(Bulgaria) S Karatantcheva	6	6
(Austria) B Haas	3	2
(United States) A Kratzer	4	6	6
7	(Australia) L Cabrera	6	3	4

Second round
1	(United States) M Brengle	1	2
Q	(Japan) M Osaka	6	6
LL	(Mexico) AS Sánchez	1	2
5	(Ukraine) A Kalinina	6	6
3	(United States) T Townsend	6	6
(Japan) R Ozaki	0	3
(Bulgaria) S Karatantcheva	6	7^{7}
(United States) A Kratzer	2	6^{5}

Quarterfinals
Q	(Japan) M Osaka	2	7^{7}	5
5	(Ukraine) A Kalinina	6	6^{5}	7
3	(United States) T Townsend	3	6	7^{7}
(Bulgaria) S Karatantcheva	6	4	6^{2}

Semifinals
5	(Ukraine) A Kalinina	6	7^{7}
3	(United States) T Townsend	3	6^{5}

=== Bottom half ===
First round
8	(United States) J Loeb	2	2
(United States) G Min	6	6
Q	(United States) S Chang	7	7
(United States) V Duval	5	5
(Ukraine) O Ianchuk	2	4
Q	(Italy) C Rosatello	6	6
Q	(Poland) I Świątek	6^{3}	3
4	(Colombia) M Duque Mariño	7^{7}	6
6	(Romania) I Bara	4	0
WC	(United States) K Stewart	6	6
(Norway) U Eikeri	6	4	6^{2}
(United States) F Di Lorenzo	3	6	7^{7}
WC	(United States) A Kiick	3	6	6
(United States) L Chirico	6	3	2
(United States) I Falconi	6	4	4
2	(United States) J Brady	1	6	6

Second round
(United States) G Min	3	6	6
Q	(United States) S Chang	6	4	4
Q	(Italy) C Rosatello	2	3
4	(Colombia) M Duque Mariño	6	6
WC	(United States) K Stewart	4	6	6
(United States) F Di Lorenzo	6	3	3
WC	(United States) A Kiick	2	5
2	(United States) J Brady	6	7

Quarterfinals
(United States) G Min	4	1
4	(Colombia) M Duque Mariño	6	6
WC	(United States) K Stewart	3	5
2	(United States) J Brady	6	7

Semifinals
4	(Colombia) M Duque Mariño	6	6
2	(United States) J Brady	4	2
