= 2021 Boar's Head Resort Women's Open – Singles =

Singles
- 2021 Boar's Head Resort Women's Open

Final
- Champion: (United States) Claire Liu
- Runner-up: (China) Wang Xinyu
- Score: 3–6, 6–4, 4–1, ret.

Events
Singles	Doubles
← 2019 ·	Boar's Head Resort Women's Open	· 2022 →

Whitney Osuigwe was the defending champion, having won the last edition in 2019 but retired in the first round against Arianne Hartono.

Claire Liu won the title after Wang Xinyu retired in the final at 3–6, 6–4, 4–1.

== Seeds ==
1. (United States) Madison Brengle (first round, retired)
2. (Egypt) Mayar Sherif (second round)
3. (United States) Kristie Ahn (first round)
4. (Romania) Irina Bara (second round)
5. (Belarus) Olga Govortsova (first round)
6. (China) Wang Xinyu (final, retired)
7. (United Kingdom) Harriet Dart (quarterfinals, withdrew)
8. (Poland) Magdalena Fręch (first round)

== Draw ==
=== Key ===
- Q = Qualifier
- WC = Wild card
- LL = Lucky loser
- Alt = Alternate
- SE = Special exempt
- PR = Protected ranking
- ITF = ITF entry
- JE = Junior exempt
- w/o = Walkover
- r = Retired
- d = Defaulted
- SR = Special ranking

=== Finals ===
Semifinals
(United States) Sachia Vickery	3	3
(United States) Claire Liu	6	6
Q	(United Kingdom) Katie Boulter	3	0^{r}
6	(China) Wang Xinyu	6	0

Final
(United States) Claire Liu	3	6	4
6	(China) Wang Xinyu	6	4	1^{r}

=== Top half ===
First round
1	(United States) M Brengle	5	6	5^{r}
(Australia) Ar Rodionova	7	4	6
(United States) A Kiick	7	6
Q	(United States) G Min	5	4
(United States) W Osuigwe	4	6	0^{r}
Q	(Netherlands) A Hartono	6	4	4
(United States) S Vickery	4	6	6
8	(Poland) M Fręch	6	2	3
4	(Romania) I Bara	7	7
(Romania) G Talabă	5	5
Q	(United States) H Chang	1	1
(United States) C Liu	6	6
Q	(Indonesia) A Sutjiadi	6	4	7^{7}
(United States) R Anderson	3	6	6^{5}
(Paraguay) V Cepede Royg	6	3	5
7	(United Kingdom) H Dart	3	6	7

Second round
(Australia) Ar Rodionova	2	4
(United States) A Kiick	6	6
Q	(Netherlands) A Hartono	2	4
(United States) S Vickery	6	6
4	(Romania) I Bara	2	0
(United States) C Liu	6	6
Q	(Indonesia) A Sutjiadi	3	4
7	(United Kingdom) H Dart	6	6

Quarterfinals
(United States) A Kiick	3	5
(United States) S Vickery	6	7
(United States) C Liu	w/o
7	(United Kingdom) H Dart

Semifinals
(United States) S Vickery	3	3
(United States) C Liu	6	6

=== Bottom half ===
First round
8	(Belarus) O Govortsova	4	3
WC	(United States) A Parks	6	6
(Japan) M Hibi	4	6^{2}
Q	(Norway) U Eikeri	6	7^{7}
(France) C Paquet	6^{5}	0^{r}
Q	(United Kingdom) K Boulter	7^{7}	2
Q	(United States) M Mateas	3	6	6
3	(United States) K Ahn	6	4	3
6	(China) Xin Wang	6	6
(United States) UM Arconada	4	2
WC	(United States) K Volynets	6	1	6
(United States) D Lao	2	6	4
(United States) H Baptiste	6	6
Q	(United States) J Loeb	2	2
WC	(United States) E Navarro	4	1
2	(Egypt) M Sherif	6	6

Second round
WC	(United States) A Parks	6	6
Q	(Norway) U Eikeri	4	1
Q	(United Kingdom) K Boulter	6	6
Q	(United States) M Mateas	4	0
6	(China) Xin Wang	6	6
WC	(United States) K Volynets	1	3
(United States) H Baptiste	6	7^{7}
2	(Egypt) M Sherif	3	6^{4}

Quarterfinals
WC	(United States) A Parks	2	3
Q	(United Kingdom) K Boulter	6	6
6	(China) Xin Wang	6	3	6
(United States) H Baptiste	1	6	3

Semifinals
Q	(United Kingdom) K Boulter	3	0^{r}
6	(China) Xin Wang	6	0
