= 2016 Boyd Tinsley Women's Clay Court Classic =

- Date: 25 April–1 May
- Edition: 15th
- Category: ITF Women's Circuit
- Prize money: $50,000
- Surface: Clay
- Location: Charlottesville, Virginia, United States

Champions

Singles
- (United States) Taylor Townsend

Doubles
- (United States) Asia Muhammad / (United States) Taylor Townsend
← 2015 ·	Boyd Tinsley Women's Clay Court Classic	· 2017 →

The 2016 Boyd Tinsley Women's Clay Court Classic was a professional tennis tournament played on outdoor clay courts. It was the fifteenth edition of the tournament and part of the 2016 ITF Women's Circuit, offering a total of $50,000 in prize money. It took place in Charlottesville, Virginia, United States, on 25 April–1 May 2016.

== Singles main draw entrants ==
=== Seeds ===
Country	Player	Rank^{1}	Seed
USA	Shelby Rogers	107	1
USA	Anna Tatishvili	114	2
SWE	Rebecca Peterson	131	3
RUS	Alexandra Panova	143	4
ISR	Julia Glushko	144	5
NED	Cindy Burger	155	6
USA	Jessica Pegula	160	7
BEL	Elise Mertens	162	8

- ^{1} Rankings as of 18 April 2016.

=== Other entrants ===
The following players received wildcards into the singles main draw:

- (United States) Danielle Collins
- (United States) Kayla Day
- (United States) Michaela Gordon
- (United States) Taylor Townsend

The following players received entry from the qualifying draw:

- (United States) Raveena Kingsley
- (United Kingdom) Tara Moore
- (Australia) Olivia Rogowska
- (United States) Alexandra Stevenson

The following players received entry from by a lucky loser spot:

- (United States) Sanaz Marand

The following player received entry by a protected ranking:

- (Canada) Heidi El Tabakh

== Champions ==
=== Singles ===
- (United States) Taylor Townsend def. (United States) Grace Min, 7–5, 6–1

=== Doubles ===
- (United States) Asia Muhammad / (United States) Taylor Townsend def. (Russia) Alexandra Panova / (United States) Shelby Rogers, 7–6^{(7–4)}, 6–0
