= 2024 Boar's Head Resort Women's Open – Doubles =

Doubles
- 2024 Boar's Head Resort Women's Open

Final
- Champions: (United Kingdom) Emily Appleton (United States) Quinn Gleason
- Runners-up: Maria Kononova; Maria Kozyreva
- Score: 7–6^{(7–5)}, 6–1

Events
Singles	Doubles
← 2023 ·	Boar's Head Resort Women's Open	· 2025 →

Sophie Chang and Yuan Yue were the defending champions but Yuan chose to compete in Madrid. Chang partnered Maya Joint but lost in the quarterfinals to Jessie Aney and Christina Rosca.

Emily Appleton and Quinn Gleason won the title, defeating Maria Kononova and Maria Kozyreva in the final, 7–6^{(7–5)}, 6–1.

== Seeds ==
1. (United Kingdom) Emily Appleton / (United States) Quinn Gleason (champions)
2. (Lithuania) Justina Mikulskytė / (Ukraine) Valeriya Strakhova (first round)
3. (United States) Anna Rogers / (United States) Alana Smith (quarterfinals)
4. (United States) Jessie Aney / (United States) Christina Rosca (semifinals)

== Draw ==
=== Key ===
- Q = Qualifier
- WC = Wild card
- LL = Lucky loser
- Alt = Alternate
- SE = Special exempt
- PR = Protected ranking
- ITF = ITF entry
- JE = Junior exempt
- w/o = Walkover
- r = Retired
- d = Defaulted
- SR = Special ranking

First round
1	(United Kingdom) E Appleton (United States) Q Gleason	6	6
(Canada) K Cross (United States) M Mateas	4	1
(United States) E Kalieva (United States) A Li	7^{7}	5	[10]
(Ukraine) K Volodko (India) S Yamalapalli	6^{3}	7	[6]
3	(United States) A Rogers (United States) A Smith	6	6
(Greece) V Grammatikopoulou (Mexico) AS Sánchez	4	3
(Hungary) F Stollár (New Zealand) L Sun	6	5	[10]
(United States) K Day (United States) K Scott	3	7	[8]
(United States) S Chang (Australia) M Joint	6	6
WC	(United States) R Anderson (United States) A Bowers	3	2
WC	(United States) A Urhobo (United States) M Yamakita	4	7^{7}	[10]
4	(United States) J Aney (United States) C Rosca	6	6^{3}	[12]
(United States) R McAdoo (United States) M Zamarripa	6	7^{7}
(United States) V Hu (Argentina) M Krywoj	4	6^{4}
M Kononova; M Kozyreva	6	6
2	(Lithuania) J Mikulskytė (Ukraine) V Strakhova	2	1

Quarterfinals
1	(United Kingdom) E Appleton (United States) Q Gleason	6	6
(United States) E Kalieva (United States) A Li	4	3
3	(United States) A Rogers (United States) A Smith	2	3
(Hungary) F Stollár (New Zealand) L Sun	6	6
(United States) S Chang (Australia) M Joint	6^{5}	3
4	(United States) J Aney (United States) C Rosca	7^{7}	6
(United States) R McAdoo (United States) M Zamarripa	4	3
M Kononova; M Kozyreva	6	6

Semifinals
1	(United Kingdom) E Appleton (United States) Q Gleason	6	4	[10]
(Hungary) F Stollár (New Zealand) L Sun	4	6	[7]
4	(United States) J Aney (United States) C Rosca	6	5	[6]
M Kononova; M Kozyreva	4	7	[10]

Final
1	(United Kingdom) E Appleton (United States) Q Gleason	7^{7}	6
M Kononova; M Kozyreva	6^{5}	1
