= 2022 Boar's Head Resort Women's Open – Singles =

Singles
- 2022 Boar's Head Resort Women's Open

Final
- Champion: (United States) Louisa Chirico
- Runner-up: (China) Wang Xiyu
- Score: 6–4, 6–3

Events
Singles	Doubles
← 2021 ·	Boar's Head Resort Women's Open	· 2023 →

Claire Liu was the defending champion but chose not to participate.

Louisa Chirico won the title, defeating Wang Xiyu in the final, 6–4, 6–3.

== Seeds ==
1. (Romania) Irina Bara (first round)
2. (Germany) Tatjana Maria (semifinals)
3. (China) Wang Xiyu (final)
4. (United States) Alycia Parks (first round)
5. (United States) Katie Volynets (second round)
6. (Italy) Lucrezia Stefanini (semifinals)
7. (Japan) Nao Hibino (second round)
8. (United States) Caroline Dolehide (first round)

== Draw ==
=== Key ===
- Q = Qualifier
- WC = Wild card
- LL = Lucky loser
- Alt = Alternate
- SE = Special exempt
- PR = Protected ranking
- ITF = ITF entry
- JE = Junior exempt
- w/o = Walkover
- r = Retired
- d = Defaulted
- SR = Special ranking

=== Finals ===
Semifinals
(United States) Louisa Chirico	7^{9}	6
6	(Italy) Lucrezia Stefanini	6^{7}	1
3	(China) Wang Xiyu	3	6	6
2	(Germany) Tatjana Maria	6	3	3

Final
(United States) Louisa Chirico	6	6
3	(China) Wang Xiyu	4	3

=== Top half ===
First round
1	(Romania) I Bara	3	5
(United States) R Anderson	6	7
Q	(United States) K Day	6	6
O Govortsova	3	2
Q	(United Kingdom) T Moore	0	0^{r}
(United States) L Chirico	6	1
(Australia) S Mendez	6	4	6
8	(United States) C Dolehide	4	6	4
4	(United States) A Parks	4	1
Q	(United States) E Douglas	6	6
Q	(United States) R McAdoo	6^{2}	2
WC	(United States) W Osuigwe	7^{7}	6
Q	(Canada) C Brace	5	2
(Hungary) T Babos	7	6
Q	(Georgia (country)) S Shapatava	3	1
6	(Italy) L Stefanini	6	6

Second round
(United States) R Anderson	6	1	7^{7}
Q	(United States) K Day	4	6	6^{4}
(United States) L Chirico	3	7	6
(Australia) S Mendez	6	5	1
Q	(United States) E Douglas	4	6	7
WC	(United States) W Osuigwe	6	4	5
(Hungary) T Babos	6	1	1
6	(Italy) L Stefanini	3	6	6

Quarterfinals
(United States) R Anderson	2	1
(United States) L Chirico	6	6
Q	(United States) E Douglas	2	5
6	(Italy) L Stefanini	6	7

Semifinals
(United States) L Chirico	7^{9}	6
6	(Italy) L Stefanini	6^{7}	1

=== Bottom half ===
First round
5	(United States) K Volynets	6	6
(United States) E Bektas	4	1
WC	(United States) T Townsend	6	1	6
WC	(United States) E Mandlik	4	6	0
Q	(Romania) G Lee	2	6	6
(United States) F Di Lorenzo	6	4	3
(Greece) V Grammatikopoulou	3	0
3	(China) Xiy Wang	6	6
7	(Japan) N Hibino	5	6	6
(Mexico) M Zacarías	7	3	2
(Japan) K Nara	6	6
Q	(Germany) J Jebawy	1	1
WC	(United States) S Vickery	6	6
(United States) J Loeb	3	0
(Argentina) ML Carlé	2	5
2	(Germany) T Maria	6	7

Second round
5	(United States) K Volynets	4	6	5
WC	(United States) T Townsend	6	3	7
Q	(Romania) G Lee	4	2
3	(China) Xiy Wang	6	6
7	(Japan) N Hibino	2	3
(Japan) K Nara	6	6
WC	(United States) S Vickery	3	5
2	(Germany) T Maria	6	7

Quarterfinals
WC	(United States) T Townsend	4	1
3	(China) Xiy Wang	6	6
(Japan) K Nara	3	3
2	(Germany) T Maria	6	6

Semifinals
3	(China) Xiy Wang	3	6	6
2	(Germany) T Maria	6	3	3
