= 2021 Boar's Head Resort Women's Open – Doubles =

Doubles
- 2021 Boar's Head Resort Women's Open

Final
- Champions: (Kazakhstan) Anna Danilina (Australia) Arina Rodionova
- Runners-up: (New Zealand) Erin Routliffe (Indonesia) Aldila Sutjiadi
- Score: 6–1, 6–3

Events
Singles	Doubles
← 2019 ·	Boar's Head Resort Women's Open	· 2022 →

Asia Muhammad and Taylor Townsend were the defending champions, having won the last edition in 2019, however both players chose not to participate.

Anna Danilina and Arina Rodionova won the title, defeating Erin Routliffe and Aldila Sutjiadi in the final, 6–1, 6–3.

== Seeds ==
1. (Kazakhstan) Anna Danilina / (Australia) Arina Rodionova (champions)
2. (Japan) Eri Hozumi / (Japan) Miyu Kato (first round)
3. (Slovakia) Tereza Mihalíková / (United States) Ingrid Neel (quarterfinals)
4. (Norway) Ulrikke Eikeri / (United States) Quinn Gleason (first round)

== Draw ==
=== Key ===
- Q = Qualifier
- WC = Wild card
- LL = Lucky loser
- Alt = Alternate
- SE = Special exempt
- PR = Protected ranking
- ITF = ITF entry
- JE = Junior exempt
- w/o = Walkover
- r = Retired
- d = Defaulted
- SR = Special ranking

=== Draw ===
First round
1	(Kazakhstan) A Danilina (Australia) Ar Rodionova	6	6
WC	(Canada) R Johanson (United States) E Navarro	1	2
(Indonesia) B Gumulya (Indonesia) J Rompies	4	6	[8]
Alt	(United States) A Kiick (United States) S Vickery	6	4	[10]
3	(Slovakia) T Mihalíková (United States) I Neel	5	6	[10]
WC	(Ukraine) Y Starodubtseva (Belarus) A Yakubovich	7	4	[7]
(United States) K Ahn (United Kingdom) H Dart	6	6
WC	(United States) R McAdoo (United States) A Parks	4	2
Alt	(United Kingdom) T Moore (United States) E Bektas	2	4
(New Zealand) E Routliffe (Indonesia) A Sutjiadi	6	6
(United States) C Harrison (United States) M Sanchez	6	6
4	(Norway) U Eikeri (United States) Q Gleason	0	3
(United States) R Anderson (United States) J Loeb	5	4
(Romania) I Bara (Poland) M Fręch	7	6
(United States) H Baptiste (United States) W Osuigwe	6	6
2	(Japan) E Hozumi (Japan) M Kato	4	0

Quarterfinals
1	(Kazakhstan) A Danilina (Australia) Ar Rodionova	6	0
Alt	(United States) A Kiick (United States) S Vickery	2	0^{r}
3	(Slovakia) T Mihalíková (United States) I Neel	6^{5}	1
(United States) K Ahn (United Kingdom) H Dart	7^{7}	6
(New Zealand) E Routliffe (Indonesia) A Sutjiadi	6	5	[10]
(United States) C Harrison (United States) M Sanchez	2	7	[4]
(Romania) I Bara (Poland) M Fręch	4	2
(United States) H Baptiste (United States) W Osuigwe	6	6

Semifinals
1	(Kazakhstan) A Danilina (Australia) Ar Rodionova	w/o
(United States) K Ahn (United Kingdom) H Dart
(New Zealand) E Routliffe (Indonesia) A Sutjiadi	6	3	[10]
(United States) H Baptiste (United States) W Osuigwe	4	6	[3]

Final
1	(Kazakhstan) A Danilina (Australia) Ar Rodionova	6	6
(New Zealand) E Routliffe (Indonesia) A Sutjiadi	1	3
