= 2024 Boar's Head Resort Women's Open =

Tennis tournament

- Date: 22–28 April 2024
- Edition: 22nd
- Category: ITF Women's World Tennis Tour
- Prize money: $60,000
- Surface: Clay / Outdoor
- Location: Charlottesville, United States

Champions

Singles
- (United States) Louisa Chirico

Doubles
- (United Kingdom) Emily Appleton / (United States) Quinn Gleason
← 2023 ·	Boar's Head Resort Women's Open	· 2025 →

The 2024 Boar's Head Resort Women's Open was a professional tennis tournament played on outdoor clay courts. It was the twenty-second edition of the tournament, which was part of the 2024 ITF Women's World Tennis Tour. It took place in Charlottesville, United States, between 22 and 28 April 2024.

== Champions ==
=== Singles ===
- (United States) Louisa Chirico def. (United States) Kayla Day, 6–1, 7–5

=== Doubles ===
- (United Kingdom) Emily Appleton / (United States) Quinn Gleason def. Maria Kononova / Maria Kozyreva, 7–6^{(7–5)}, 6–1

== Singles main draw entrants ==
=== Seeds ===
Country	Player	Rank	Seed
USA	Kayla Day	86	1
USA	Ann Li	164	2
NZL	Lulu Sun	167	3
GRE	Valentini Grammatikopoulou	209	4
USA	Elvina Kalieva	215	5
LTU	Justina Mikulskytė	227	6
USA	Hanna Chang	247	7
USA	Varvara Lepchenko	258	8

- Rankings are as of 15 April 2024.

=== Other entrants ===
The following players received wildcards into the singles main draw:

- (United States) Ashton Bowers
- (United States) Katrina Scott
- (United States) Hibah Shaikh
- (United States) Alana Smith

The following players received entry from the qualifying draw:

- (United States) Sophie Chang
- (United States) Jaeda Daniel
- (United States) Victoria Flores
- (United States) Rasheeda McAdoo
- (Slovakia) Martina Okáľová
- (United States) Gabriella Price
- (Sweden) Kajsa Rinaldo Persson
- (United States) Akasha Urhobo
