= 2023 Boar's Head Resort Women's Open – Doubles =

Doubles
- 2023 Boar's Head Resort Women's Open

Final
- Champions: (United States) Sophie Chang (China) Yuan Yue
- Runners-up: (Japan) Nao Hibino (Hungary) Fanny Stollár
- Score: 6–3, 6–3

Events
Singles	Doubles
← 2022 ·	Boar's Head Resort Women's Open	· 2024 →

Sophie Chang and Angela Kulikov were the defending champions but Kulikov chose not to participate.

Chang successfully defended her title partnering alongside Yuan Yue, defeating Nao Hibino and Fanny Stollár in the final, 6–3, 6–3.

== Seeds ==
1. (United States) Kaitlyn Christian / (United States) Sabrina Santamaria (first round)
2. (Chinese Taipei) Liang En-shuo / (Australia) Olivia Tjandramulia (first round)
3. (United States) Anna Rogers / (Mexico) Marcela Zacarías (first round)
4. (Indonesia) Jessy Rompies / (India) Prarthana Thombare (semifinals)

== Draw ==
=== Key ===
- Q = Qualifier
- WC = Wild card
- LL = Lucky loser
- Alt = Alternate
- SE = Special exempt
- PR = Protected ranking
- ITF = ITF entry
- JE = Junior exempt
- w/o = Walkover
- r = Retired
- d = Defaulted
- SR = Special ranking

First round
1	(United States) K Christian (United States) S Santamaria	3	3
(United States) S Chang (China) Y Yuan	6	6
WC	(United States) S Crawford (Ukraine) Y Starodubtseva	1	4
(United States) M Jones (United States) J Loeb	6	6
4	(Indonesia) J Rompies (India) P Thombare	7^{7}	6
WC	(United States) J Adams (Canada) M Collard	6^{3}	3
WC	(United States) E Navarro (United States) M Navarro	2	6	[7]
(Japan) H Kuwata (United Kingdom) Y Miyazaki	6	4	[10]
(Australia) E Bolton (United States) Q Gleason	4	7	[8]
(United States) L Chirico (Romania) G Lee	6	5	[10]
(United States) F Di Lorenzo (United States) C Rosca	6	6^{1}	[10]
3	(United States) A Rogers (Mexico) M Zacarías	4	7^{7}	[7]
(Poland) K Kawa (Australia) A Sharma	7^{7}	7^{7}
(United States) R Montgomery; D Shnaider	6^{5}	6^{0}
(Japan) N Hibino (Hungary) F Stollár	6	6
2	(Chinese Taipei) E-s Liang (Australia) O Tjandramulia	2	2

Quarterfinals
(United States) S Chang (China) Y Yuan	7^{7}	7^{11}
(United States) M Jones (United States) J Loeb	6^{5}	6^{9}
4	(Indonesia) J Rompies (India) P Thombare	6	7
(Japan) H Kuwata (United Kingdom) Y Miyazaki	4	5
(United States) L Chirico (Romania) G Lee	2	3
(United States) F Di Lorenzo (United States) C Rosca	6	6
(Poland) K Kawa (Australia) A Sharma	3	6^{6}
(Japan) N Hibino (Hungary) F Stollár	6	7^{8}

Semifinals
(United States) S Chang (China) Y Yuan	6	6
4	(Indonesia) J Rompies (India) P Thombare	3	4
(United States) F Di Lorenzo (United States) C Rosca	3	1
(Japan) N Hibino (Hungary) F Stollár	6	6

Final
(United States) S Chang (China) Y Yuan	6	6
(Japan) N Hibino (Hungary) F Stollár	3	3
