= 2021 Boar's Head Resort Women's Open =

Tennis tournament

- Date: 26 April–2 May 2021
- Edition: 19th
- Category: ITF Women's World Tennis Tour
- Prize money: $60,000
- Surface: Clay
- Location: Charlottesville, Virginia, United States

Champions

Singles
- (United States) Claire Liu

Doubles
- (Kazakhstan) Anna Danilina / (Australia) Arina Rodionova
← 2019 ·	Boar's Head Resort Women's Open	· 2022 →

The 2021 Boar's Head Resort Women's Open was a professional women's tennis tournament played on outdoor clay courts. It was the nineteenth edition of the tournament which was part of the 2021 ITF Women's World Tennis Tour. It took place in Charlottesville, Virginia, United States between 26 April and 2 May 2021.

== Singles main-draw entrants ==
=== Seeds ===
Country	Player	Rank^{1}	Seed
USA	Madison Brengle	80	1
EGY	Mayar Sherif	123	2
USA	Kristie Ahn	124	3
ROU	Irina Bara	134	4
BLR	Olga Govortsova	142	5
CHN	Wang Xinyu	145	6
GBR	Harriet Dart	150	7
POL	Magdalena Fręch	157	8

- ^{1} Rankings are as of 19 April 2021.

=== Other entrants ===
The following players received wildcards into the singles main draw:

- (United States) Emma Navarro
- (United States) Alycia Parks
- (United States) Katie Volynets

The following players received entry from the qualifying draw:

- (United Kingdom) Katie Boulter
- (United States) Hanna Chang
- (Norway) Ulrikke Eikeri
- (Netherlands) Arianne Hartono
- (United States) Jamie Loeb
- (United States) Maria Mateas
- (United States) Grace Min
- (Indonesia) Aldila Sutjiadi

== Champions ==
=== Singles ===
- (United States) Claire Liu def. (China) Wang Xinyu, 3–6, 6–4, 4–1, ret.

=== Doubles ===
- (Kazakhstan) Anna Danilina / (Australia) Arina Rodionova def. (New Zealand) Erin Routliffe / (Indonesia) Aldila Sutjiadi, 6–1, 6–3
