= 2024 Boar's Head Resort Women's Open – Singles =

Singles
- 2024 Boar's Head Resort Women's Open

Final
- Champion: (United States) Louisa Chirico
- Runner-up: (United States) Kayla Day
- Score: 6–1, 7–5

Events
Singles	Doubles
← 2023 ·	Boar's Head Resort Women's Open	· 2025 →

Emma Navarro was the defending champion but chose to compete in Madrid instead.

Louisa Chirico won the title, defeating Kayla Day in the final, 6–1, 7–5.

== Seeds ==
1. (United States) Kayla Day (final)
2. (United States) Ann Li (second round)
3. (New Zealand) Lulu Sun (semifinals)
4. (Greece) Valentini Grammatikopoulou (quarterfinals)
5. (United States) Elvina Kalieva (quarterfinals)
6. (Lithuania) Justina Mikulskytė (first round)
7. (United States) Hanna Chang (quarterfinals)
8. (United States) Varvara Lepchenko (quarterfinals)

== Draw ==
=== Key ===
- Q = Qualifier
- WC = Wild card
- LL = Lucky loser
- Alt = Alternate
- SE = Special exempt
- PR = Protected ranking
- ITF = ITF entry
- JE = Junior exempt
- w/o = Walkover
- r = Retired
- d = Defaulted
- SR = Special ranking

=== Finals ===
Semifinals
1	(United States) Kayla Day	7	6
3	(New Zealand) Lulu Sun	5	2
(United States) Louisa Chirico	7^{8}	6
(Australia) Maya Joint	6^{6}	1

Final
1	(United States) Kayla Day	1	5
(United States) Louisa Chirico	6	7

=== Top half ===
First round
1	(United States) K Day	6	6
(India) S Yamalapalli	2	0
Q	(United States) S Chang	6	7
(United States) M Mateas	4	5
Q	(Slovakia) M Okáľová	2	7	6
WC	(United States) H Shaikh	6	5	4
(United States) L Hovde	2	7^{7}	5
8	(United States) V Lepchenko	6	6^{5}	7
3	(New Zealand) L Sun	6	6
(United States) R Anderson	3	3
Q	(Sweden) K Rinaldo Persson	6	2	3
WC	(United States) K Scott	1	6	6
WC	(United States) A Smith	4	1
Q	(United States) V Flores	6	6
Q	(United States) J Daniel	6	3	4
5	(United States) E Kalieva	4	6	6

Second round
1	(United States) K Day	7	6
Q	(United States) S Chang	5	4
Q	(Slovakia) M Okáľová	4	6^{3}
8	(United States) V Lepchenko	6	7^{7}
3	(New Zealand) L Sun	6	1
WC	(United States) K Scott	2	0^{r}
Q	(United States) V Flores	1	4
5	(United States) E Kalieva	6	6

Quarterfinals
1	(United States) K Day	7^{8}	7
8	(United States) V Lepchenko	6^{6}	5
3	(New Zealand) L Sun	6	3	6
5	(United States) E Kalieva	2	6	4

Semifinals
1	(United States) K Day	7	6
3	(New Zealand) L Sun	5	2

=== Bottom half ===
First round
6	(Lithuania) J Mikulskytė	1	4
(United States) A Kiick	6	6
WC	(United States) A Bowers	3	4
(United States) L Chirico	6	6
(Liechtenstein) K von Deichmann	7^{7}	4	7
Q	(United States) A Urhobo	6^{2}	6	5
(Hungary) F Stollár	2	5
4	(Greece) V Grammatikopoulou	6	7
7	(United States) H Chang	6	6
(Ukraine) V Strakhova	1	4
(United States) V Hu	2	6	1
Q	(United States) G Price	6	4	6
(Mexico) AS Sánchez	6	1	3
(Australia) M Joint	2	6	6
Q	(United States) R McAdoo	3	6^{2}
2	(United States) A Li	6	7^{7}

Second round
(United States) A Kiick	0^{r}
(United States) L Chirico	2
(Liechtenstein) K von Deichmann	6	2	3
4	(Greece) V Grammatikopoulou	1	6	6
7	(United States) H Chang	6	3
Q	(United States) G Price	1	0^{r}
(Australia) M Joint	6	6
2	(United States) A Li	4	2

Quarterfinals
(United States) L Chirico	4	6	6
4	(Greece) V Grammatikopoulou	6	3	3
7	(United States) H Chang	3	4
(Australia) M Joint	6	6

Semifinals
(United States) L Chirico	7^{8}	6
(Australia) M Joint	6^{6}	1
