= 2017 Boyd Tinsley Women's Clay Court Classic – Singles =

Singles
- 2017 Boyd Tinsley Women's Clay Court Classic

Final
- Champion: (United States) Madison Brengle
- Runner-up: (United States) Caroline Dolehide
- Score: 6–4, 6–3

Events
Singles	Doubles
← 2016 ·	Boyd Tinsley Women's Clay Court Classic	· 2018 →

Taylor Townsend was the defending champion, but chose not to participate.

Madison Brengle won the title, defeating Caroline Dolehide in the final, 6–4, 6–3.

== Seeds ==
1. (United States) Madison Brengle (champion)
2. (Bulgaria) Elitsa Kostova (second round)
3. (United States) Kayla Day (second round)
4. (United States) Jamie Loeb (semifinals)
5. (Austria) Barbara Haas (second round)
6. (Australia) Lizette Cabrera (second round)
7. (United States) Sofia Kenin (first round)
8. (Hungary) Fanny Stollár (second round)

== Draw ==
=== Key ===
- Q = Qualifier
- WC = Wild card
- LL = Lucky loser
- Alt = Alternate
- ITF = ITF entry
- PR = Protected ranking
- SR = Special ranking
- SE = Special exempt
- JE = Junior exempt
- JR = Junior Accelerator Programme entrant
- CO = College Accelerator Programme entrant
- NG = Next Gen Accelerator Program entrant
- w/o = Walkover
- r = Retired
- d = Defaulted

=== Finals ===
Semifinals
1	(United States) Madison Brengle	6	6
4	(United States) Jamie Loeb	3	2
WC	(Croatia) Ajla Tomljanović	1	6^{7}
(United States) Caroline Dolehide	6	7^{9}

Final
1	(United States) Madison Brengle	6	6
(United States) Caroline Dolehide	4	3

=== Top half ===
First round
1	(United States) M Brengle	6	6
(Serbia) J Jakšić	2	2
Q	(United States) R Anderson	7	4	2
(Mexico) R Zarazúa	5	6	6
PR	(Ukraine) A Kalinina	6	6
(United States) L Albanese	1	3
(United States) E Halbauer	0	6	6^{2}
5	(Austria) B Haas	6	3	7^{7}
4	(United States) J Loeb	6	6
Q	(Belgium) E Boeykens	2	3
(United States) D Collins	6	6
LL	(United States) J Elbaba	1	2
(Canada) A Wozniak	7^{8}	1	4
WC	(United States) C Liu	6^{6}	6	6
Q	(Canada) C Zhao	2	1
8	(Hungary) F Stollár	6	6

Second round
1	(United States) M Brengle	6	6
(Mexico) R Zarazúa	0	1
PR	(Ukraine) A Kalinina	6	6
5	(Austria) B Haas	3	0
4	(United States) J Loeb	6	6
(United States) D Collins	4	0
WC	(United States) C Liu	6	6
8	(Hungary) F Stollár	2	0

Quarterfinals
1	(United States) M Brengle	6	6
PR	(Ukraine) A Kalinina	3	0
4	(United States) J Loeb	6	6
WC	(United States) C Liu	4	4

Semifinals
1	(United States) M Brengle	6	6
4	(United States) J Loeb	3	2

=== Bottom half ===
First round
7	(United States) S Kenin	4	1
WC	(Croatia) A Tomljanović	6	6
Q	(Ukraine) E Ianchuk	6	3	4
(Bulgaria) S Karatantcheva	3	6	6
(Mexico) V Rodríguez	6	6
(United States) C Whoriskey	3	2
(Portugal) M Larcher de Brito	4	1
3	(United States) K Day	6	6
6	(Australia) L Cabrera	4	6	6
(Brazil) PC Gonçalves	6	3	1
(Argentina) C Pella	6	6
(United States) J Elie	3	1
(United States) UM Arconada	6	2	4
(United States) C Dolehide	2	6	6
WC	(United States) M Sanchez	6^{2}	6	3
2	(Bulgaria) E Kostova	7^{7}	3	6

Second round
WC	(Croatia) A Tomljanović	6	6
(Bulgaria) S Karatantcheva	3	1
(Mexico) V Rodríguez	6	3	6
3	(United States) K Day	3	6	4
6	(Australia) L Cabrera	6^{7}	6^{1}
(Argentina) C Pella	7^{9}	7^{7}
(United States) C Dolehide	6	6
2	(Bulgaria) E Kostova	1	3

Quarterfinals
WC	(Croatia) A Tomljanović	6	7^{7}
(Mexico) V Rodríguez	2	6^{4}
(Argentina) C Pella	4	6	4
(United States) C Dolehide	6	4	6

Semifinals
WC	(Croatia) A Tomljanović	1	6^{7}
(United States) C Dolehide	6	7^{9}
