= 2016 Boyd Tinsley Women's Clay Court Classic – Singles =

Singles
- 2016 Boyd Tinsley Women's Clay Court Classic

Final
- Champion: (United States) Taylor Townsend
- Runner-up: (United States) Grace Min
- Score: 7–5, 6–1

Events
Singles	Doubles
← 2015 ·	Boyd Tinsley Women's Clay Court Classic	· 2017 →

Allie Kiick was the defending champion, but chose not to participate.

Taylor Townsend won the title, defeating Grace Min in an all-American final, 7–5, 6–1.

== Seeds ==
1. (United States) Shelby Rogers (first round)
2. (United States) Anna Tatishvili (semifinals)
3. (Sweden) Rebecca Peterson (first round)
4. (Russia) Alexandra Panova (quarterfinals)
5. (Israel) Julia Glushko (first round)
6. (Netherlands) Cindy Burger (first round)
7. (United States) Jessica Pegula (quarterfinals)
8. (Belgium) Elise Mertens (first round)

== Main draw ==
=== Key ===
- Q = Qualifier
- WC = Wild card
- LL = Lucky loser
- Alt = Alternate
- SE = Special exempt
- PR = Protected ranking
- ITF = ITF entry
- JE = Junior exempt
- w/o = Walkover
- r = Retired
- d = Defaulted
- SR = Special ranking

=== Finals ===
Semifinals
(Bulgaria) Elitsa Kostova	2	1
WC	(United States) Taylor Townsend	6	6
(United States) Grace Min	6	6
2	(United States) Anna Tatishvili	4	0

Final
WC	(United States) Taylor Townsend	7	6
(United States) Grace Min	5	1

=== Top half ===
First round
1	(United States) S Rogers	6	2	3
(United States) J Brady	3	6	6
WC	(United States) K Day	6	6^{5}	6
(United States) M Sanchez	3	7^{7}	1
(Bulgaria) E Kostova	1	6	6
WC	(United States) M Gordon	6	2	2
LL	(United States) S Marand	6	7
6	(Netherlands) C Burger	2	5
3	(Sweden) R Peterson	4	6	3
WC	(United States) T Townsend	6	2	6
Q	(United Kingdom) T Moore	7	1
(Ukraine) E Ianchuk	5	0^{1}
PR	(Canada) H El Tabakh	2^{r}
(United States) S Vickery	5
(United States) J Boserup	6	6
8	(Belgium) E Mertens	2	2

Second round
(United States) J Brady	2	4
WC	(United States) K Day	6	6
(Bulgaria) E Kostova	7^{7}	0	6
LL	(United States) S Marand	6^{5}	6	2
WC	(United States) T Townsend	5
Q	(United Kingdom) T Moore	0^{r}
(United States) S Vickery	6	6
(United States) J Boserup	4	3

Quarterfinals
WC	(United States) K Day	6	4	4
(Bulgaria) E Kostova	4	6	6
WC	(United States) T Townsend	6	3	6
(United States) S Vickery	4	6	2

Semifinals
(Bulgaria) E Kostova	2	1
WC	(United States) T Townsend	6	6

=== Bottom half ===
First round
5	(Israel) J Glushko	6^{9}	6	4
(United States) G Min	7^{11}	0	6
(Canada) F Abanda	4	6	6
(United States) J Loeb	6	3	3
(Switzerland) C Perrin	3	0
(United States) A Muhammad	6	6
(Portugal) M Larcher de Brito	1	1
4	(Russia) A Panova	6	6
7	(United States) J Pegula	6	7
(Serbia) J Jakšić	4	5
Q	(United States) R Kingsley	7^{7}	3	4
WC	(United States) D Collins	6^{0}	6	6
Q	(United States) A Stevenson	3	2
Q	(Australia) O Rogowska	6	6
(France) S Foretz	4	6^{4}
2	(United States) A Tatishvili	6	7^{7}

Second round
(United States) G Min	6	6
(Canada) F Abanda	3	0
(United States) A Muhammad	6^{4}	4
4	(Russia) A Panova	7^{7}	6
7	(United States) J Pegula	6	6
WC	(United States) D Collins	4	3
Q	(Australia) O Rogowska	1	1
2	(United States) A Tatishvili	6	6

Quarterfinals
(United States) G Min	6	6
4	(Russia) A Panova	3	3
7	(United States) J Pegula	2	6^{7}
2	(United States) A Tatishvili	6	7^{9}

Semifinals
(United States) G Min	6	6
2	(United States) A Tatishvili	4	0
