= 2016 Boyd Tinsley Women's Clay Court Classic – Doubles =

Doubles
- 2016 Boyd Tinsley Women's Clay Court Classic

Final
- Champions: (United States) Asia Muhammad (United States) Taylor Townsend
- Runners-up: (Russia) Alexandra Panova (United States) Shelby Rogers
- Score: 7–6^{(7–4)}, 6–0

Events
Singles	Doubles
← 2015 ·	Boyd Tinsley Women's Clay Court Classic	· 2017 →

Françoise Abanda and Maria Sanchez were the defending champions, but both players chose to compete with different partners. Abanda partnered Sachia Vickery, but withdrew before the first round, whilst Sanchez partnered Elise Mertens, losing in the first round.

Asia Muhammad and Taylor Townsend won the title, defeating Alexandra Panova and Shelby Rogers in the final, 7–6^{(7–4)}, 6–0.

== Seeds ==
1. (Belgium) Elise Mertens / (United States) Maria Sanchez (first round)
2. (United States) Asia Muhammad / (United States) Taylor Townsend (champions)
3. (Israel) Julia Glushko / (Sweden) Rebecca Peterson (first round)
4. (United Kingdom) Tara Moore / (Switzerland) Conny Perrin (first round)

== Draw ==
=== Key ===
- Q = Qualifier
- WC = Wild card
- LL = Lucky loser
- Alt = Alternate
- SE = Special exempt
- PR = Protected ranking
- ITF = ITF entry
- JE = Junior exempt
- w/o = Walkover
- r = Retired
- d = Defaulted
- SR = Special ranking

First round
1	(Belgium) E Mertens (United States) M Sanchez	4	6	[7]
(United States) J Brady (Netherlands) C Burger	6	4	[10]
(Canada) F Abanda (United States) S Vickery
(Russia) A Panova (United States) S Rogers	w/o
4	(United Kingdom) T Moore (Switzerland) C Perrin	6	4	[3]
(Norway) U Eikeri (Russia) A Morgina	2	6	[10]
(United States) J Loeb (United States) M Oudin	2	6^{4}
(United States) J Cako (Serbia) J Jakšić	6	7^{7}
(United States) C Whoriskey (United States) K Wong	5	6	[10]
(Ukraine) O Ianchuk (Poland) J Jegiołka	7	1	[6]
(United States) J Pegula (United States) A Tatishvili	6	6
3	(Israel) J Glushko (Sweden) R Peterson	3	4
(United States) M Gordon (Canada) R Johanson	5	6^{2}
(United States) D Collins (United States) M Kelley	7	7^{7}
(United States) S Chang (United States) S Marand	3	1
2	(United States) A Muhammad (United States) T Townsend	6	6

Quarterfinals
(United States) J Brady (Netherlands) C Burger	4	3
(Russia) A Panova (United States) S Rogers	6	6
(Norway) U Eikeri (Russia) A Morgina	3	3
(United States) J Cako (Serbia) J Jakšić	6	6
(United States) C Whoriskey (United States) K Wong	6	6
(United States) J Pegula (United States) A Tatishvili	4	4
(United States) D Collins (United States) M Kelley	1	4
2	(United States) A Muhammad (United States) T Townsend	6	6

Semifinals
(Russia) A Panova (United States) S Rogers	7	3	[10]
(United States) J Cako (Serbia) J Jakšić	5	6	[2]
(United States) C Whoriskey (United States) K Wong	1	2
2	(United States) A Muhammad (United States) T Townsend	6	6

Final
(Russia) A Panova (United States) S Rogers	6^{4}	0
2	(United States) A Muhammad (United States) T Townsend	7^{7}	6
