= 2017 Boyd Tinsley Women's Clay Court Classic – Doubles =

Doubles
- 2017 Boyd Tinsley Women's Clay Court Classic

Final
- Champion: (Serbia) Jovana Jakšić (Argentina) Catalina Pella
- Runner-up: (United States) Madison Brengle (United States) Danielle Collins
- Score: 6–4, 7–6^{(7–5)}

Events
Singles	Doubles
← 2016 ·	Boyd Tinsley Women's Clay Court Classic	· 2018 →

Asia Muhammad and Taylor Townsend were the defending champions, but both players chose not to participate.

Jovana Jakšić and Catalina Pella won the title, defeating Madison Brengle and Danielle Collins in the final, 6–4, 7–6^{(7–5)}.

== Seeds ==
1. (United States) Ashley Weinhold / (United States) Caitlin Whoriskey (first round)
2. (United States) Jamie Loeb / (Mexico) Renata Zarazúa (semifinals)
3. (Australia) Lizette Cabrera / (Russia) Anna Morgina (first round)
4. (Indonesia) Jessy Rompies / (United States) Keri Wong (first round)

== Draw ==
=== Key ===
- Q = Qualifier
- WC = Wild card
- LL = Lucky loser
- Alt = Alternate
- ITF = ITF entry
- PR = Protected ranking
- SR = Special ranking
- SE = Special exempt
- JE = Junior exempt
- JR = Junior Accelerator Programme entrant
- CO = College Accelerator Programme entrant
- NG = Next Gen Accelerator Program entrant
- w/o = Walkover
- r = Retired
- d = Defaulted

First round
1	(United States) A Weinhold (United States) C Whoriskey	3	7^{8}	[8]
(Serbia) J Jakšić (Argentina) C Pella	6	6^{6}	[10]
(Bulgaria) E Kostova (United States) A Mueller	6	6^{3}	[8]
(Canada) C Robillard-Millette (Canada) C Zhao	1	7^{7}	[10]
4	(Indonesia) J Rompies (United States) K Wong	3	2
(United States) E Bektas (Mexico) V Rodríguez	6	6
WC	(United States) C Liu (United States) C Van Nguyen
(United States) J Elbaba (United States) R Yurovsky	w/o
(United States) R Anderson (Ukraine) A Kalinina	6	6
(United States) E Halbauer (United States) S Kenin	3	2
WC	(United States) M Brengle (United States) D Collins	6^{4}	6	[10]
3	(Australia) L Cabrera (Russia) A Morgina	7^{7}	1	[2]
(United States) UM Arconada (Indonesia) B Gumulya	6	2	[5]
(United States) J Elie (United States) S Marand	2	6	[10]
WC	(United States) M Kobelt (United States) M Schmidt	2	3
2	(United States) J Loeb (Mexico) R Zarazúa	6	6

Quarterfinals
(Serbia) J Jakšić (Argentina) C Pella	6	6
(Canada) C Robillard-Millette (Canada) C Zhao	0	4
(United States) E Bektas (Mexico) V Rodríguez	6	6
(United States) J Elbaba (United States) R Yurovsky	1	4
(United States) R Anderson (Ukraine) A Kalinina	6^{6}	6^{3}
WC	(United States) M Brengle (United States) D Collins	7^{8}	7^{7}
(United States) J Elie (United States) S Marand	4	7^{14}	[7]
2	(United States) J Loeb (Mexico) R Zarazúa	6	6^{12}	[10]

Semifinals
(Serbia) J Jakšić (Argentina) C Pella	6	5	[10]
(United States) E Bektas (Mexico) V Rodríguez	1	7	[8]
WC	(United States) M Brengle (United States) D Collins	6	6
2	(United States) J Loeb (Mexico) R Zarazúa	3	4

Final
(Serbia) J Jakšić (Argentina) C Pella	6	7^{7}
WC	(United States) M Brengle (United States) D Collins	4	6^{5}
