= 2025 Boar's Head Resort Women's Open =

- Date: 21–27 April 2025
- Edition: 23rd
- Category: ITF Women's World Tennis Tour
- Prize money: $100,000
- Surface: Clay / Outdoor
- Location: Charlottesville, United States

Champions

Singles
- (United States) Iva Jovic

Doubles
- Maria Kozyreva / Iryna Shymanovich
- Boar's Head Resort Women's Open

The 2025 Boar's Head Resort Women's Open was a professional tennis tournament played on outdoor clay courts. It was the twenty-third edition of the tournament, which was part of the 2025 ITF Women's World Tennis Tour. It took place in Charlottesville, United States, between 21 and 27 April 2025.

== Champions ==
=== Singles ===
- (United States) Iva Jovic def. (Romania) Irina Maria Bara, 6–0, 6–1

=== Doubles ===
- Maria Kozyreva / Iryna Shymanovich def. (Canada) Kayla Cross / (Australia) Petra Hule, 7–5, 7–5

== Singles main draw entrants ==
=== Seeds ===
Country	Player	Rank^{1}	Seed
USA	Iva Jovic	141	1
AUS	Arina Rodionova	172	2
USA	Hanna Chang	180	3
BRA	Laura Pigossi	183	4
USA	Lauren Davis	190	5
USA	Whitney Osuigwe	192	6
AUS	Astra Sharma	202	7
	Iryna Shymanovich	203	8

- ^{1} Rankings are as of 14 April 2025.

=== Other entrants ===
The following players received wildcards into the singles main draw:

- (United States) Caty McNally
- (Canada) Annabelle Xu
- (United States) Jamie Loeb
- (United States) Madison Sieg

The following players received entry from the qualifying draw:

- (United States) Victoria Osuigwe
- (Bulgaria) Lia Karatancheva
- (United States) Adriana Reami
- (United States) Haley Giavara
- (United States) Jessie Aney
- Maria Kozyreva
- (Greece) Martha Matoula
- (United States) Victoria Hu
