= Natasha Subhash =

American tennis player (born 2001)

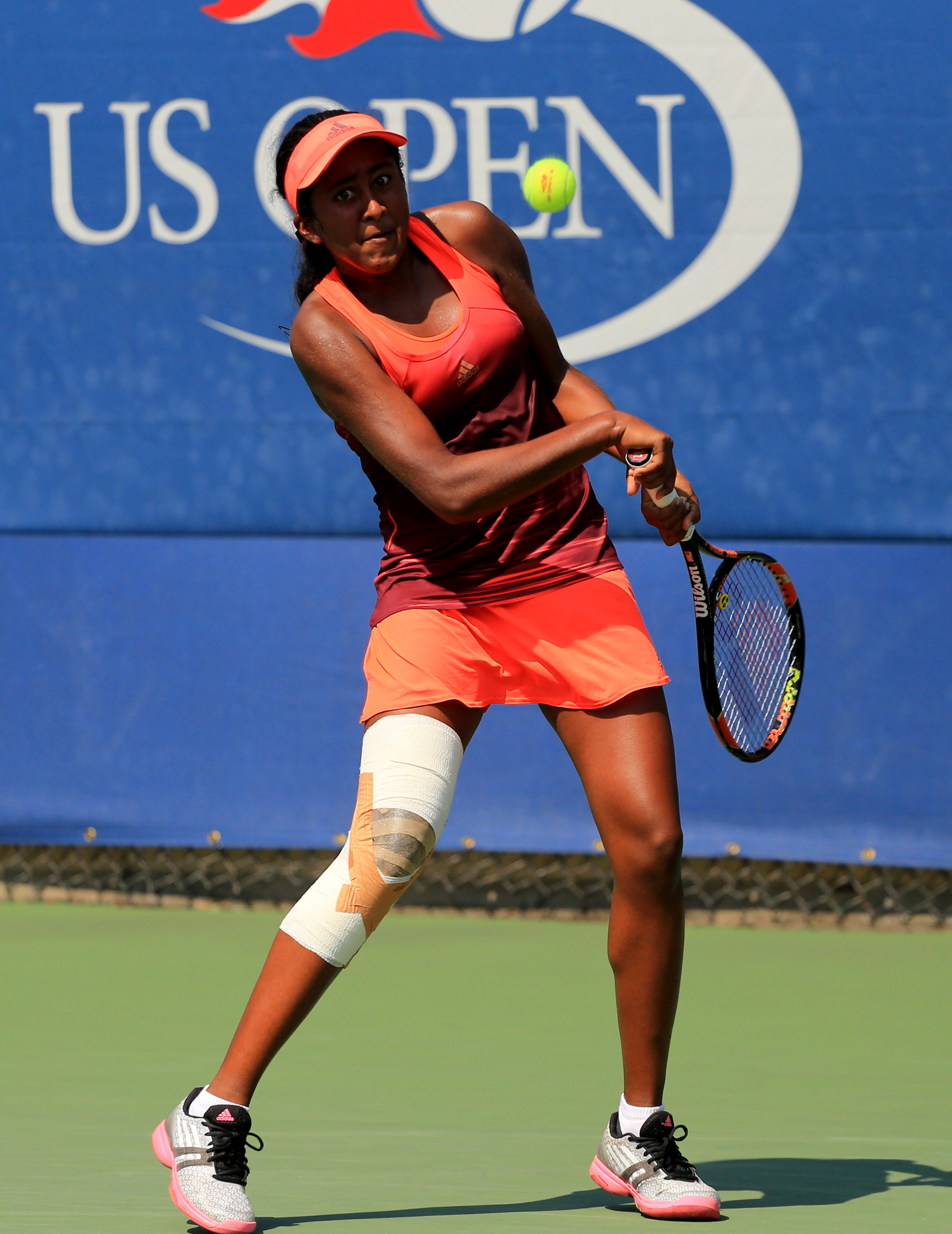
- Subhash at the 2015 US Open
- Country (sports): United States
- Born: September 2, 2001 (age 25) Fairfax, Virginia
- Plays: Right-handed (two-handed backhand)
- College: University of Virginia
- Coach: Bear Schofield
- Prize money: $18,633

Singles
- Career record: 49–24
- Career titles: 2 ITF
- Highest ranking: No. 382 (February 24, 2020)

Doubles
- Career record: 17–12
- Career titles: 2 ITF
- Highest ranking: No. 566 (December 31, 2018)

Natasha Subhash (born September 2, 2001) is an American former tennis player.

Subhash won two singles titles and two doubles titles on the ITF Women's Circuit in her career. She made her WTA Tour main-draw debut at the 2018 Washington Open in doubles, partnering with Alana Smith.

Subhash played college tennis at the University of Virginia. She was awarded the Intercollegiate Tennis Association (ITA)'s Arthur Ashe Leadership and Sportsmanship Award after her senior year in 2023.

== ITF Circuit finals ==
=== Singles: 3 (2 titles, 1 runner-up) ===
Legend $25,000 tournaments $15,000 tournaments	Finals by surface Hard (0–0) Clay (2–1)

Result	W–L	Date	Tournament	Tier	Surface	Opponent	Score
Win	1–0	May 2019	ITF Williamsburg, United States	15,000	Clay	(Switzerland) Nina Stadler	6–2, 6–3
Win	2–0	Jun 2019	ITF Orlando, United States	15,000	Clay	(United States) Tori Kinard	6–1, 6–2
Loss	2–1	Jun 2019	ITF Bethany Beach, United States	25,000	Clay	(United States) Usue Maitane Arconada	1–6, 1–6

=== Doubles: 2 (2 titles) ===
Legend $25,000 tournaments $15,000 tournaments	Finals by surface Hard (1–0) Clay (1–0)

Result	W–L	Date	Tournament	Tier	Surface	Partner	Opponents	Score
Win	1–0	Mar 2018	ITF Tampa, United States	15,000	Clay	(United States) Caty McNally	(United States) Rasheeda McAdoo (United States) Katerina Stewart	3–6, 6–3, [10–6]
Win	2–0	Mar 2019	ITF Carson, United States	15,000	Hard	(United States) Rasheeda McAdoo	(United States) Nicole Mossmer (United States) Chanelle Van Nguyen	6–2, 6–4
