= Louisa Chirico =

American tennis player (born 1996)

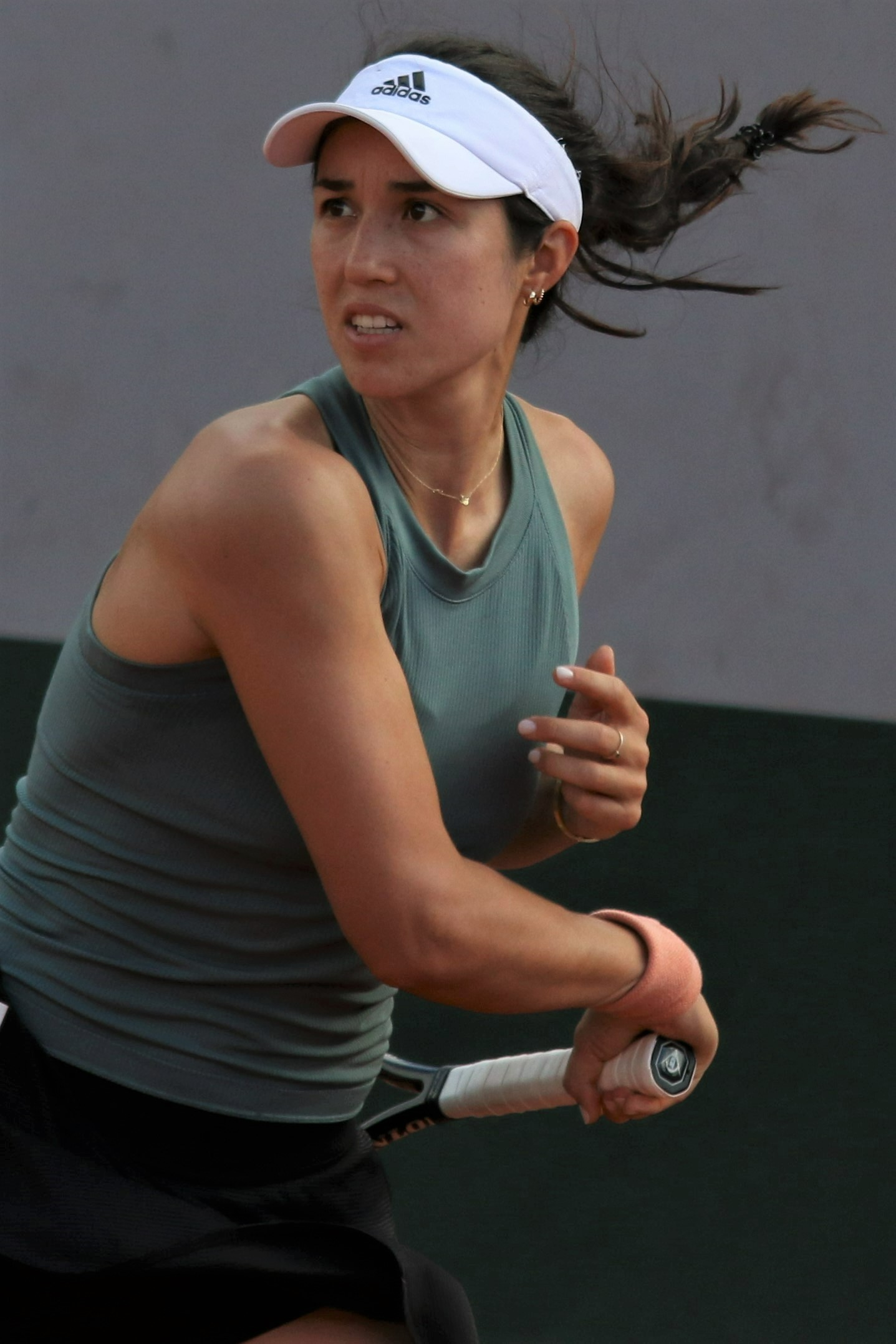
- Chirico at the 2022 French Open
- Country (sports): United States
- Residence: Westchester, New York
- Born: May 16, 1996 (age 30) Morristown, New Jersey
- Height: 1.75 m (5 ft 9 in)
- Plays: Right-handed
- Prize money: $1,655,677

Singles
- Career record: 344–290
- Career titles: 7 ITF
- Highest ranking: No. 58 (October 24, 2016)
- Current ranking: No. 528 (September 21, 2026)

Grand Slam singles results
- Australian Open: 1R (2017)
- French Open: 2R (2016)
- Wimbledon: 1R (2016, 2022)
- US Open: 1R (2015, 2016)

Doubles
- Career record: 65–74
- Career titles: 2 ITF
- Highest ranking: No. 184 (March 6, 2017)
- Current ranking: No. 757 (September 21, 2026)

Grand Slam doubles results
- Australian Open: 2R (2017)
- French Open: 1R (2016)
- Wimbledon: 1R (2016)
- US Open: 2R (2016)

Grand Slam mixed doubles results
- Wimbledon: 1R (2016)
- US Open: 1R (2022)
- Last updated on: September 22, 2026.

Louisa Chirico (born May 16, 1996) is an American tennis player. On 24 October 2016, she reached her best singles ranking of world No. 58. On 6 March 2017, she peaked at No. 184 in the WTA doubles rankings. Chirico has won seven singles titles and two doubles titles on the ITF Women's Circuit. Her best performance in singles at a Grand Slam tournament was reaching the second round at the 2016 French Open.

== Personal life ==
Chirico comes from Harrison, New York, and is of Korean descent through her mother.

== Career highlights ==
=== Early years ===
Partnering Jan Abaza, Chirico won her first 50k tournament at the 2013 Melbourne Pro Classic, defeating Asia Muhammad and Allie Will in the final.

=== 2015: Major debut ===
She made her major main-draw debut at the 2015 French Open, after being awarded a wildcard into the event by the USTA. She lost in the first round to the ninth seed Ekaterina Makarova, in straight sets.

Chirico won her first WTA Tour match at the Washington Open defeating Heather Watson. She then beat the top-30 player, Alizé Cornet, in a third set tie-breaker but lost to Sloane Stephens in the quarterfinals.

=== 2016–2018: First major and WTA 1000 wins ===
In May 2016, Chirico won five qualifier and main draw matches at the Madrid Open to reach the semifinals. Later that month, she reached the main draw of the 2016 French Open through three qualifying wins and made it to the second round.

After reaching a career-high ranking of No. 58 in October 2016, Chirico dropped outside the top 500 in September 2018.

=== 2022: Return to majors ===
Chirico won her first WTA Tour main-draw match in five years when she defeated Alison Riske-Amritraj at the 2022 San Diego Open. She made it through qualifying at Wimbledon, after a five years absence from the majors since the 2017 French Open. She lost to fourth seed Paula Badosa in the first round.

=== 2023: Swedish Open semifinal ===
Chirico defeated Coco Vandeweghe in the final round of qualifying to make it into the main draw at the Austin Open in February where she lost in the first round against Madison Brengle.

She qualified for the Charleston Open in April, but again was eliminated in her opening contest, losing to Sloane Stephens, in three sets. The following month, she was advanced from qualifying into the main draw at the Strasbourg International but was knocked out in round one by eventual champion Elina Svitolina.

In July, Chirico reached the semifinals at the Swedish Open with wins over Malene Helgø, fourth-seeded Rebecca Peterson and seventh seed Claire Liu, before losing to top seed Emma Navarro. A week later, she qualified for the Hungarian Open but fell to Claire Liu in the first round.

At the San Diego Open in September, Chirico again qualified for the main draw but could not get past round one opponent Danielle Collins.

=== 2024: Charlottesville title, second SF at Swedish Open ===
Chirico won the Charlottesville Open in Virginia, in April, with a straight sets victory over top seed Kayla Day in the final.

She reached semifinals at the Swedish Open in July, defeating eighth seed Renata Zarazúa, Mananchaya Sawangkaew and Katarina Zavatska on her way to the last four where she lost against seventh seed Martina Trevisan in three sets. Later that month Chirico qualified for the main draw at the Prague Open but lost in the first round to second seed Kateřina Siniaková.

In August, ranked No. 218, she qualified for the WTA 1000 Canadian Open, losing to 10th seed Anna Kalinskaya. Chirico won the W75 Tevlin Challenger in November, defeating Kayla Cross in the final.

=== 2025: WTA 125 final ===
Chirico qualified for the Charleston Open and defeated Erika Andreeva in three sets to reach the second round, in which she lost to 11th seed Jeļena Ostapenko.

She finished runner-up at the WTA 125 Internacional de Valencia losing to Nuria Párrizas Díaz in the final.

In July, Chirico qualified for the main draw at the Canadian Open, but lost in the first round to Jéssica Bouzas Maneiro in a match lasting more than three hours.

== Performance timelines ==
Key
W	F	SF	QF	#R	RR	Q#	P#	DNQ	A	Z#	PO	G	S	B	NMS	NTI	P	NH

(W) winner; (F) finalist; (SF) semifinalist; (QF) quarterfinalist; (#R) rounds 4, 3, 2, 1; (RR) round-robin stage; (Q#) qualification round; (P#) preliminary round; (DNQ) did not qualify; (A) absent; (Z#) Davis/Fed Cup Zonal Group (with number indication) or (PO) play-off; (G) gold, (S) silver or (B) bronze Olympic/Paralympic medal; (NMS) not a Masters tournament; (NTI) not a Tier I tournament; (P) postponed; (NH) not held; (SR) strike rate (events won / competed); (W–L) win–loss record.
To avoid confusion and double counting, these charts are updated at the conclusion of a tournament or when the player's participation has ended.

Only main-draw results in WTA Tour, Grand Slam tournaments, Fed Cup/Billie Jean King Cup and Olympic Games are included in win–loss records.

=== Singles ===
Current through the 2025 WTA Tour.

Tournament	2013	2014	2015	2016	2017	2018	...	2021	2022	2023	2024	2025	SR	W–L
Grand Slam tournaments
Australian Open	A	A	Q2	A	1R	Q1		A	A	Q1	A	Q1	0 / 1	0–1
French Open	A	A	1R	2R	1R	A		Q1	Q2	A	A	Q1	0 / 3	1–3
Wimbledon	A	A	Q3	1R	Q1	A		A	1R	A	Q1	Q1	0 / 2	0–2
US Open	Q3	Q2	1R	1R	Q2	A		Q1	Q1	Q2	Q1	Q1	0 / 2	0–2
Win–loss	0–0	0–0	0–2	1–3	0–2	0–0		0–0	0–1	0–0	0–0	0–0	0 / 8	1–8
WTA 1000
Indian Wells Open	A	A	1R	Q1	2R	Q1		A	A	A	A	A	0 / 1	3–1
Miami Open	A	A	A	Q1	1R	A		A	A	A	A	Q1	0 / 1	0–1
Madrid Open	A	A	A	SF	A	A		A	A	A	A	A	0 / 1	3–1
Canadian Open	A	A	Q1	A	A	A		A	A	Q1	1R	1R	0 / 2	0–2
Cincinnati Open	A	A	Q1	1R	A	A		A	A	A	A	Q1	0 / 1	0–1
Pan Pacific / Wuhan Open (Note: In 2014, the Pan Pacific Open was downgraded to a Premier event and replaced by the Wuhan Open. The Premier 5 tournaments were reclassified as WTA 1000 tournaments in 2021.)	A	A	A	2R	A	A		NH		A	A	A	0 / 1	1–1
China Open	A	A	A	1R	A	A		NH		A	A	A	0 / 1	0–1
Career statistics
Tournaments	0	0	8	14	10	0		0	3	2	1		Career total: 38	
Overall win-loss	0–0	0–0	3–8	10–14	2–10	0–0		0–0	1–3	0–2	0–1		0 / 38	16–38

=== Doubles ===
Tournament	2014	2015	2016	2017	...	2022	W–L
Australian Open	A	A	A	2R		A	1–1
French Open	A	A	1R	A		A	0–1
Wimbledon	A	A	1R	A		A	0–1
US Open	1R	A	2R	A		A	1–2
Win–loss	0–1	0–0	1–3	1–1		0–0	2–5

== WTA 125 finals ==
=== Singles: 2 (2 runner-ups) ===
Result	W–L	Date	Tournament	Surface	Opponent	Score
Loss	0–1	Nov 2015	Open de Limoges, France	Hard (i)	(France) Caroline Garcia	1–6, 3–6
Loss	0–2	Jun 2025	Internacional de Valencia, Spain	Clay	(Spain) Nuria Párrizas Díaz	5–7, 6–7^{(9)}

== ITF Circuit finals ==
=== Singles: 13 (7 titles, 6 runner-ups) ===
Legend $100,000 tournaments (0–2) $60/75,000 tournaments (4–1) $25/35,000 tournaments (2–3) $10,000 tournaments (1–0)	Finals by surface Hard (2–3) Clay (5–3)

Result	W–L	Date	Tournament	Tier	Surface	Opponent	Score
Win	1–0	May 2012	ITF Sumter, United States	10,000	Hard	(United States) Victoria Duval	6–4, 6–3
Loss	1–1	Feb 2013	ITF Surprise, US	25,000	Hard	(United Kingdom) Tara Moore	6–4, 6–3
Win	2–1	Jun 2014	ITF Padua, Italy	25,000	Clay	(Brazil) Paula Cristina Gonçalves	6–2, 1–6, 7–6^{(3)}
Loss	2–2	Jun 2014	ITF Lenzerheide, Switzerland	25,000	Clay	(Russia) Elizaveta Kulichkova	5–7, 2–6
Loss	2–3	Feb 2015	Midland Tennis Classic, US	100,000	Hard (i)	(Germany) Tatjana Maria	2–6, 0–6
Win	3–3	Apr 2015	Dothan Pro Classic, US	50,000	Clay	(United States) Katerina Stewart	7–6^{(1)}, 3–6, 7–6^{(1)}
Loss	3–4	May 2015	ITF Indian Harbour Beach, US	50,000	Clay	(United States) Katerina Stewart	4–6, 6–3, 3–6
Loss	3–5	Sep 2017	Abierto Tampico, Mexico	100,000+H	Hard	(United States) Irina Falconi	5–7, 7–6^{(3)}, 1–6
Win	4–5	Mar 2019	ITF São Paulo, Brazil	W25	Clay	(Montenegro) Danka Kovinić	6–0, 6–2
Win	5–5	Apr 2022	Charlottesville Open, US	W60	Clay	(China) Wang Xiyu	6–4, 6–3
Win	6–5	Apr 2024	Charlottesville Open, US	W75	Clay	(United States) Kayla Day	6–1, 7–5
Win	7–5	Oct 2024	Toronto Challenger, Canada	W75	Hard (i)	(Canada) Kayla Cross	7–6^{(3)}, 6–3
Loss	7–6	Jul 2025	Amstelveen Open, Netherlands	W35	Clay	(Germany) Katharina Hobgarski	1–0 ret.

=== Doubles: 7 (2 titles, 5 runner-ups) ===
Legend $80,000 tournaments (0–1) $50,000 tournaments (1–1) $25,000 tournaments (1–3)	Finals by surface Hard (0–1) Clay (2–4)

Result	W–L	Date	Tournament	Tier	Surface	Partner	Opponents	Score
Loss	0–1	Feb 2013	ITF Rancho Mirage, US	25,000	Hard	(United States) Jan Abaza	(United Kingdom) Tara Moore (United Kingdom) Melanie South	6–4, 2–6, [10–12]
Win	1–1	Apr 2013	ITF Indian Harbour Beach, US	50,000	Clay	(United States) Jan Abaza	(United States) Asia Muhammad (United States) Allie Will	6–4, 6–4
Loss	1–2	Jan 2014	ITF Port St. Lucie, US	25,000	Clay	(United States) Jan Abaza	(Hungary) Réka Luca Jani (Russia) Irina Khromacheva	4–6, 4–6
Loss	1–3	Jun 2014	ITF Brescia, Italy	25,000	Clay	(United States) Asia Muhammad	(United States) Sanaz Marand (Argentina) Florencia Molinero	4–6, 6–4, [8–10]
Win	2–3	Jun 2014	ITF Lenzerheide, Switzerland	25,000	Clay	(United States) Sanaz Marand	(South Korea) Jang Su-jeong (Poland) Justyna Jegiołka	6–3, 6–4
Loss	2–4	Apr 2016	Osprey Challenger, US	50,000	Clay	(United States) Katerina Stewart	(United States) Asia Muhammad (United States) Taylor Townsend	1–6, 7–6^{(5)}, [4–10]
Loss	2–5	May 2018	ITF Charleston Pro, US	80,000	Clay	(United States) Allie Kiick	(Chile) Alexa Guarachi (New Zealand) Erin Routliffe	1–6, 6–3, [5–10]
