= Boar's Head Resort Women's Open =

- 2024 Boar's Head Resort Women's Open

ITF Women's Tour
- Event name: Boar's Head Resort Women's Open (2019–); Boyd Tinsley Clay Court Classic (–2018)
- Location: Charlottesville, Virginia, United States
- Venue: Boars Head Sports Club
- Category: ITF Women's Circuit
- Surface: Clay
- Draw: 32S/32Q/16D
- Prize money: $60,000
- Website: Official website

The Boar's Head Resort Women's Open (formerly known as the Boyd Tinsley Clay Court Classic) is a tournament for professional female tennis players. The event is classified as a $60k tournament and has been held annually on outdoor clay courts in Charlottesville, Virginia, United States, since 2002.

== Past finals ==
=== Singles ===
Year	Champion	Runner-up	Score
2026	(Mexico) Renata Zarazúa	(Argentina) Martina Capurro Taborda	6–1, 1–6, 7–5
2025	(United States) Iva Jovic	(Romania) Irina Bara	6–0, 6–1
2024	(United States) Louisa Chirico	(United States) Kayla Day	6–1, 7–5
2023	(United States) Emma Navarro	(United States) Ashlyn Krueger	6–1, 6–1
2022	(United States) Louisa Chirico	(China) Wang Xiyu	6–4, 6–3
2021	(United States) Claire Liu	(China) Wang Xinyu	3–6, 6–4, 4–1 ret.
2020	tournament cancelled due to the COVID-19 pandemic		
2019	(United States) Whitney Osuigwe	(United States) Madison Brengle	6–4, 1–6, 6–3
2018	(Colombia) Mariana Duque Mariño	(Ukraine) Anhelina Kalinina	0–6, 6–1, 6–2
2017	(United States) Madison Brengle	(United States) Caroline Dolehide	6–4, 6–3
2016	(United States) Taylor Townsend	(United States) Grace Min	7–5, 6–1
2015	(United States) Allie Kiick	(United States) Katerina Stewart	7–5, 6–7^{(3–7)}, 7–5
2014	(United States) Taylor Townsend	(Paraguay) Montserrat González	6–2, 6–3
2013	(United States) Shelby Rogers	(United States) Allie Kiick	6–3, 7–5
2012	(United States) Melanie Oudin	(United States) Irina Falconi	7–6^{(7–0)}, 3–6, 6–1
2011	(Canada) Stéphanie Dubois	(Portugal) Michelle Larcher de Brito	1–6, 7–6^{(7–5)}, 6–1
2010	(Netherlands) Michaëlla Krajicek	(Germany) Laura Siegemund	6–2, 6–4
2009	(United States) Lindsay Lee-Waters	(Russia) Ekaterina Bychkova	6–3, 7–5
2008	(United States) Alexis Gordon	(Russia) Olga Puchkova	6–3, 6–3
2007	(Romania) Edina Gallovits	(Germany) Angelika Bachmann	6–3, 6–3
2006	(United States) Laura Granville	(Slovakia) Dominika Cibulková	w/o
2005	(United States) Carly Gullickson	(Uzbekistan) Varvara Lepchenko	6–4, 6–4
2004	(United States) Marissa Irvin	(United States) Jamea Jackson	6–3, 7–6^{(7–5)}
2003	(Puerto Rico) Kristina Brandi	(Australia) Christina Wheeler	4−6, 6−4, 6−2
2002	(United States) Erika deLone	(Serbia and Montenegro) Jelena Janković	6–2, 6–4

=== Doubles ===
Year	Champions	Runners-up	Score
2026	(Spain) Alicia Herrero Liñana (United States) Anna Rogers	(United States) Eryn Cayetano (United States) Allura Zamarripa	6–1, 6–3
2025	Maria Kozyreva; Iryna Shymanovich	(Canada) Kayla Cross (Australia) Petra Hule	7–5, 7–5
2024	(United Kingdom) Emily Appleton (United States) Quinn Gleason	Maria Kononova; Maria Kozyreva	7–6^{(7–5)}, 6–1
2023	(United States) Sophie Chang (China) Yuan Yue	(Japan) Nao Hibino (Hungary) Fanny Stollár	6–3, 6–3
2022	(United States) Sophie Chang (United States) Angela Kulikov	(Greece) Valentini Grammatikopoulou (United States) Alycia Parks	2–6, 6–3, [10–4]
2021	(Kazakhstan) Anna Danilina (Australia) Arina Rodionova	(New Zealand) Erin Routliffe (Indonesia) Aldila Sutjiadi	6–1, 6–3
2020	tournament cancelled due to the COVID-19 pandemic		
2019	(United States) Asia Muhammad (United States) Taylor Townsend	(Czech Republic) Lucie Hradecká (Poland) Katarzyna Kawa	4–6, 7–5, [10–3]
2018	(United States) Sophie Chang (United States) Alexandra Mueller	(United States) Ashley Kratzer (United States) Whitney Osuigwe	3–6, 6–4, [10–7]
2017	(Serbia) Jovana Jakšić (Argentina) Catalina Pella	(United States) Madison Brengle (United States) Danielle Collins	6–4, 7–6^{(7–5)}
2016	(United States) Asia Muhammad (United States) Taylor Townsend	(Russia) Alexandra Panova (United States) Shelby Rogers	7–6^{(7–4)}, 6–0
2015	(Canada) Françoise Abanda (United States) Maria Sanchez	(Ukraine) Olga Ianchuk (Russia) Irina Khromacheva	6–1, 6–3
2014	(United States) Asia Muhammad (United States) Taylor Townsend	(United States) Irina Falconi (United States) Maria Sanchez	6–3, 6–1
2013	(United Kingdom) Nicola Slater (United States) Coco Vandeweghe	(United States) Nicole Gibbs (United States) Shelby Rogers	6–3, 7–6^{(7–4)}
2012	(United States) Maria Sanchez (United States) Yasmin Schnack	(Russia) Elena Bovina (Israel) Julia Glushko	6–2, 6–2
2011	(Canada) Sharon Fichman (Canada) Marie-Ève Pelletier	(United States) Julie Ditty (United States) Carly Gullickson	6–4, 6–3
2010	(United States) Julie Ditty (United States) Carly Gullickson	(United States) Alexandra Mueller (United States) Ahsha Rolle	6–4, 6–3
2009	(United States) Carly Gullickson (Australia) Nicole Kriz	(United States) Angela Haynes (Russia) Alina Jidkova	7–5, 3–6, [10–7]
2008	(United States) Raquel Kops-Jones (United States) Abigail Spears	(United States) Kimberly Couts (Georgia (country)) Anna Tatishvili	6–1, 6–3
2007	(Argentina) Erica Krauth (Sweden) Hanna Nooni	(United States) Raquel Kops-Jones (United States) Lilia Osterloh	7–6^{(7–4)}, 6–4
2006	(Canada) Marie-Ève Pelletier (United States) Sunitha Rao	(Brazil) Maria Fernanda Alves (United States) Lilia Osterloh	6–7^{(6–8)}, 6–2, 6–3
2005	(United States) Ashley Harkleroad (United States) Lindsay Lee-Waters	(United States) Samantha Reeves (Australia) Christina Wheeler	6–4, 7–5
2004	(Argentina) Erica Krauth (United States) Jessica Lehnhoff	(Puerto Rico) Vilmarie Castellvi (United States) Sunitha Rao	6–0, 6–1
2003	(United States) Bethanie Mattek (United States) Lilia Osterloh	(United States) Julie Ditty (Australia) Christina Wheeler	7–5, 6–1
2002	(United States) Erika deLone (South Africa) Jessica Steck	(United States) Teryn Ashley (United States) Kristen Schlukebir	6–2, 2–6, 7–5
