= Whitney Osuigwe =

American tennis player (born 2002)

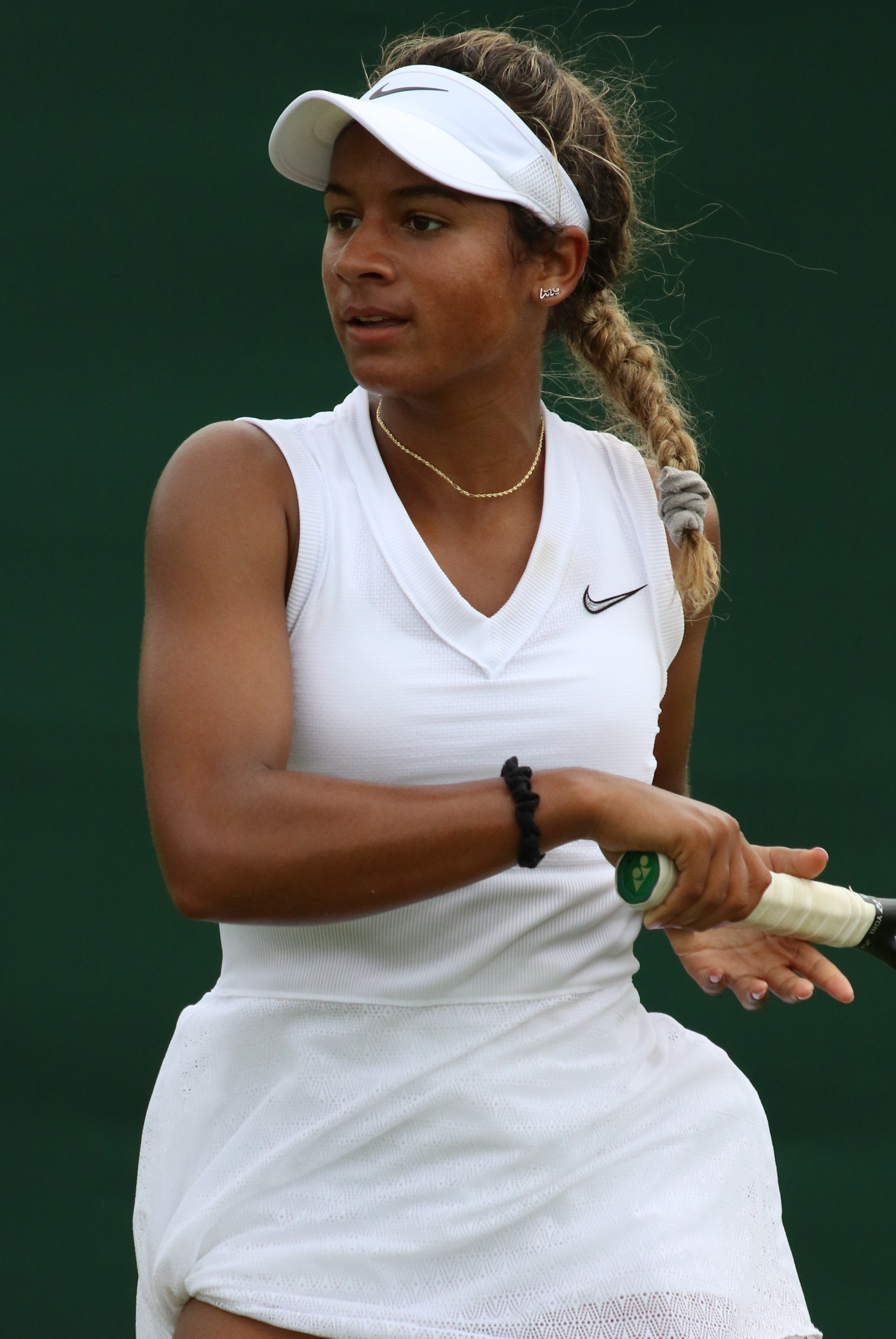
- Osuigwe at the 2019 Wimbledon Championships
- Country (sports): United States
- Born: April 17, 2002 (age 24) Bradenton, Florida
- Height: 1.68 m (5 ft 6 in)
- Turned pro: 2017
- Plays: Right (two-handed backhand)
- Coach: Desmond Osuigwe
- Prize money: $1,246,371

Singles
- Career record: 240–216
- Career titles: 5 ITF
- Highest ranking: No. 105 (August 12, 2019)
- Current ranking: No. 237 (September 21, 2026)

Grand Slam singles results
- Australian Open: 1R (2019, 2021)
- French Open: Q2 (2019)
- Wimbledon: Q2 (2025)
- US Open: 1R (2018, 2019, 2020)

Doubles
- Career record: 111–99
- Career titles: 1 WTA Challenger, 9 ITF
- Highest ranking: No. 115 (October 21, 2024)
- Current ranking: No. 1,065 ((September 21, 2026)

Grand Slam doubles results
- US Open: 2R (2019, 2022)

Grand Slam mixed doubles results
- US Open: 1R (2018)
- Last updated on: 24 September 2026.

Whitney Osuigwe (/əˈsɪɡweɪ/ ə-SIG-way; born April 17, 2002) is an American tennis player. She has a career-high singles ranking of world No. 105 and a best doubles ranking of No. 115, achieved in August 2019 and 2024, respectively.

In 2017, Osuigwe was the ITF Junior World Champion. She won the juniors 2017 French Open to become the first American to win the girls' singles event in Paris in 28 years.

== Personal life ==
Osuigwe has been playing tennis at the IMG Academy since age six, where her father Desmond has been a teacher at the academy since 1997 and acts as her primary coach. Desmond is from Lagos in Nigeria and played professional tennis events at the ITF Futures level before coming to the United States to attend college. Whitney has an older brother named Deandre who is a college basketball player and a younger sister named Victoria who also plays tennis.

== Juniors ==
In June 2017, Osuigwe climbed to No. 2 in the junior rankings by dominating the clay-court events in the previous six months. She started by reaching the semifinals at the Orange Bowl in December, and then won two Grade-1 clay-court tournaments in back-to-back weeks in February. Osuigwe capped off her dominance in this part of the season by winning the 2017 Junior French Open over fellow American Claire Liu.

In doing so, she became the first American to win the girls' event since Jennifer Capriati in 1989, the fifth American champion overall, and the ninth youngest winner of the event at 15 years and 2 months. This was also only the second time the final was contested between two Americans, with the other occurring in 1980.

Osuigwe would go on to finish the season as the number-one-ranked junior in the world, for which she was named the combined 2017 ITF Junior World Champion. Furthermore, she then won the Orange Bowl before the year came to a close.

On August 12, 2018, Osuigwe won the USTA Girls 18s National Championships which earned her a wildcard entry into the main draw of the US Open.

== Professional ==
Osuigwe made her WTA Tour main-draw debut at the 2018 Miami Open, losing to her fellow wildcard and junior rival, Claire Liu.

In January 2019, Osuigwe played alongside David Ferrer on the Spain team in the 2019 Hopman Cup, replacing Garbiñe Muguruza who was out due to injury. Osuigwe played only the mixed-doubles match, losing to the French team which consisted of Lucas Pouille and Alizé Cornet.

In March 2019, she entered the Miami Open main draw as a wildcard, winning her first-round match against fellow wildcard Mari Osaka, the sister of Naomi Osaka.

== Performance timeline ==
Key
W	F	SF	QF	#R	RR	Q#	DNQ	A	NH

(W) winner; (F) finalist; (SF) semifinalist; (QF) quarterfinalist; (#R) rounds 4, 3, 2, 1; (RR) round-robin stage; (Q#) qualification round; (DNQ) did not qualify; (A) absent; (NH) not held; (SR) strike rate (events won / competed); (W–L) win–loss record.
To avoid confusion and double counting, these charts are updated at the conclusion of a tournament or when the player's participation has ended.

Only main-draw results in WTA Tour, Grand Slam tournaments, Fed Cup/Billie Jean King Cup and Olympic Games are included in win–loss records.

=== Singles ===
Current through the 2026 US Open.

Tournament	2017	2018	2019	2020	2021	2022	2023	2024	2025	2026	SR	W–L
Grand Slam tournaments
Australian Open	A	A	1R	Q1	1R	Q2	A	A	A	Q3	0 / 2	0–2
French Open	A	A	Q2	Q1	Q1	A	A	A	Q1	Q1	0 / 0	0–0
Wimbledon	A	A	Q1	NH	Q1	A	A	A	Q2	Q1	0 / 0	0–0
US Open	Q1	1R	1R	1R	Q1	Q3	A	A	Q1	Q1	0 / 3	0–3
Win–loss	0–0	0–1	0–2	0–1	0–1	0–0	0–0	0–0	0–0	0–0	0 / 5	0–5
WTA 1000
Indian Wells	A	A	A	NH	A	A	A	A	1R	Q1	0 / 1	0–1
Miami Open	A	1R	2R	NH	Q1	Q1	Q1	A	A	Q1	0 / 2	1–2
Canadian Open	A	A	A	NH	A	A	A	A	1R	A	0 / 1	0–1
Cincinnati	A	A	A	A	A	A	A	A	1R	A	0 / 1	0–1
Career statistics
	2017	2018	2019	2020	2021	2022	2023	2024	2025	2026	SR	W–L
Tournaments	0	2	4	1	3	0	0	0	0	0	Career total: 10	
Titles	0	0	0	0	0	0	0	0	0	0	Career total: 0	
Finals	0	0	0	0	0	0	0	0	0	0	Career total: 0	
Overall win–loss	0–0	0–2	1–4	0–1	0–3	0–0	0–0	0–0	0–0	0–0	0 / 10	1–10
Year-end ranking	1120	226	132	160	247	290	368	352	140		$1,246,371	

== WTA 125 finals ==
=== Doubles: 1 (title) ===
Result	Date	Tournament	Surface	Partner	Opponents	Score
Win	Nov 2023	Midland Tennis Classic, United States	Hard (i)	(United States) Hailey Baptiste	(United States) Sophie Chang (United States) Ashley Lahey	2–6, 6–2, [10–1]

== ITF Circuit finals ==
=== Singles: 12 (5 titles, 7 runner-ups) ===
Legend W100 tournaments (0–2) W80 tournaments (2–0) W75 tournaments (0–1) W50 tournaments (2–0) W25/35 tournaments (1–4)	Finals by surface Hard (3–1) Clay (2–6)

Result	W–L	Date	Tournament	Tier	Surface	Opponent	Score
Loss	0–1	Jan 2018	ITF Wesley Chapel, United States	W25	Clay	(United States) Francesca Di Lorenzo	2–6, 6–1, 4–6
Win	1–1	Nov 2018	Tyler Pro Challenge, US	W80	Hard	(Brazil) Beatriz Haddad Maia	6–3, 6–4
Win	2–1	Apr 2019	Charlottesville Open, US	W80	Clay	(United States) Madison Brengle	6–4, 1–6, 6–3
Loss	2–2	May 2019	Tyler Pro Challenge, US	W100	Clay	(United States) Taylor Townsend	4–6, 4–6
Loss	2–3	Mar 2023	ITF Boca Raton, US	W25	Hard	(Andorra) Victoria Jiménez Kasintseva	2–6, 2–6
Loss	2–4	Apr 2023	ITF Jackson, US	W25	Clay	(Hungary) Tímea Babos	5–7, 5–7
Win	3–4	Nov 2024	ITF Boca Raton, US	W50	Hard	(Netherlands) Eva Vedder	7–6^{(8)}, 6–3
Loss	3–5	Jan 2025	ITF Palm Coast, US	W35	Clay	(United States) Elizabeth Mandlik	1–6, 7–6^{(4)}, 3–6
Loss	3–6	Jan 2025	Vero Beach Open, US	W75	Clay	(Argentina) Solana Sierra	7–6^{(6)}, 4–6, 5–7
Win	4–6	Mar 2025	ITF Santo Domingo, Dominican Republic	W50	Hard	(Mexico) Ana Sofía Sánchez	6–2, 7–5
Win	5–6	Apr 2025	ITF Boca Raton, US	W35	Clay	(United States) Akasha Urhobo	6–4, 6–3
Loss	5–7	Apr 2025	Bonita Spring Championship, US	W100	Clay	(Australia) Astra Sharma	2–6, 2–6

=== Doubles: 17 (9 titles, 8 runner-ups) ===
Legend W100 tournaments (2–2) W80 tournaments (0–1) W60/75 tournaments (2–4) W40/50 tournaments (0–1) W25/35 tournaments (4–0) W15 tournaments (1–0)	Finals by surface Hard (5–6) Clay (4–2)

Result	W–L	Date	Tournament	Tier	Surface	Partner	Opponents	Score
Win	1–0	Mar 2018	ITF Orlando, US	W15	Clay	(United States) Caty McNally	(Bulgaria) Dia Evtimova (Belarus) Ilona Kremen	6–2, 6–3
Win	2–0	Apr 2018	ITF Jackson, US	W25	Clay	(United States) Sanaz Marand	(Italy) Gaia Sanesi (South Africa) Chanel Simmonds	6–1, 6–3
Loss	2–1	Apr 2018	Charlottesville Open, US	W80	Clay	(United States) Ashley Kratzer	(United States) Sophie Chang (United States) Alexandra Mueller	6–3, 4–6, [7–10]
Loss	2–2	Jul 2018	Ashland Classic, US	W60	Hard	(United States) Sanaz Marand	(Serbia) Jovana Jakšić (Mexico) Renata Zarazúa	3–6, 7–5, [4–10]
Loss	2–3	Feb 2020	Kentucky Open, US	W100	Hard (i)	(United States) Hailey Baptiste	(United States) Catherine Harrison (United States) Quinn Gleason	5–7, 2–6
Win	3–3	Jan 2022	ITF Orlando Pro, US	W60	Hard	(United States) Hailey Baptiste	(United States) Angela Kulikov (United States) Rianna Valdes	7–6^{(7)}, 7–5
Win	4–3	Mar 2023	ITF Boca Raton, US	W25	Hard	(United States) Hailey Baptiste	(United States) Francesca Di Lorenzo (United States) Makenna Jones	6–2, 6–2
Win	5–3	Jul 2023	ITF Punta Cana, Dominican Republic	W25	Clay	(United States) Victoria Osuigwe	(Spain) Alicia Herrero Liñana (Argentina) Melany Krywoj	6–1, 1–6, [10–7]
Win	6–3	Nov 2023	ITF Charleston Pro, US	W100	Clay	(United States) Hailey Baptiste	(Uzbekistan) Nigina Abduraimova (France) Carole Monnet	6–4, 3–6, [13–11]
Loss	6–4	Jan 2024	Vero Beach Open, US	W75+H	Clay	(United States) Hailey Baptiste	(United States) Allura Zamarripa (United States) Maribella Zamarripa	3–6, 6–3, [4–10]
Loss	6–5	Feb 2024	Georgia's Rome Open, US	W75	Hard (i)	(United States) Hailey Baptiste	(United States) Angela Kulikov (United States) Jamie Loeb	w/o
Win	7–5	Feb 2024	Guanajuato Open, Mexico	W100	Hard	(United States) Hailey Baptiste	(United States) Ann Li (Canada) Rebecca Marino	7–5, 6–4
Win	8–5	Feb 2024	ITF Spring, US	W35	Hard	(United States) Alana Smith	(United States) Malkia Ngounoue (Brazil) Thaísa Pedretti	6–4, 6–4
Win	9–5	Jul 2024	Lexington Open, US	W75	Hard	(United States) Alana Smith	(United States) Carmen Corley (United States) Ivana Corley	7–6^{(5)}, 6–3
Loss	9–6	Nov 2024	ITF Austin, US	W50	Hard	(United States) Alana Smith	(Morocco) Diae El Jardi (Brazil) Thaisa Pedretti	2–6, 6–4, [12–14]
Loss	9–7	Jan 2025	Georgia's Rome Open, US	W75	Hard (i)	(Netherlands) Eva Vedder	(United States) Sophie Chang (United States) Angela Kulikov	6–7^{(3)}, 4–6
Loss	9–8	Sep 2026	Central Coast Pro Tennis Open, US	W100	Hard	(United States) Akasha Urhobo	(United States) Savannah Broadus (United States) Allura Zamarripa	5–7, 2–6

== Junior finals ==
=== Grand Slam tournaments ===
==== Singles: 1 (title) ====
Result	Year	Tournament	Surface	Opponent	Score
Win	2017	French Open	Clay	(United States) Claire Liu	6–4, 6–7^{(5–7)}, 6–3

==== Doubles: 2 (runner-ups) ====
Result	Year	Tournament	Surface	Partner	Opponents	Score
Loss	2017	Wimbledon	Grass	(United States) Caty McNally	(Serbia) Olga Danilović (Slovenia) Kaja Juvan	4–6, 3–6
Loss	2018	Wimbledon	Grass	(United States) Caty McNally	(China) Wang Xinyu (China) Wang Xiyu	2–6, 1–6

=== ITF Junior Circuit ===
==== Singles: 9 (6 titles, 3 runner-ups) ====
Legend
Grade A (1–2)
Grade 1 (4–0)
Grade 4 (1–1)

Result	W–L	Date	Tournament	Tier	Surface	Opponent	Score
Win	1–0	May 2015	ITF Plantation, US	Grade 4	Clay	(United States) Carson Branstine	6–2, 3–6, 6–4
Loss	1–1	May 2016	ITF Plantation, US	Grade 4	Clay	(United States) Carson Branstine	6–3, 4–6, 1–6
Win	2–1	Feb 2017	ITF Asunción, Paraguay	Grade 1	Clay	(Serbia) Draginja Vukovic	6–3, 6–2
Win	3–1	Feb 2017	ITF Criciúma, Brazil	Grade 1	Clay	(United Kingdom) Emily Appleton	7–5, 6–4
Win	4–1	Oct 2017	ITF Tulsa, US	Grade 1	Hard	(United States) Natasha Subhash	6–4, 6–3
Loss	4–2	Oct 2017	ITF Osaka, Japan	Grade A	Hard	(China) Wang Xinyu	4–6, 4–6
Loss	4–3	Nov 2017	ITF Mexico City	Grade A	Clay	(United States) Alexa Noel	2–6, 4–6
Win	5–3	Dec 2017	ITF Bradenton, US	Grade 1	Clay	(France) Clara Burel	6–4, 4–6, 6–1
Win	6–3	Dec 2017	ITF Plantation, US	Grade A	Clay	(Ukraine) Margaryta Bilokin	6–1, 6–2

==== Doubles: 7 (4 titles, 3 runner-ups) ====
Legend
Grade A (1–1)
Grade 1 (3–1)
Grade 4 (0–1)

Result	W–L	Date	Tournament	Tier	Surface	Partner	Opponents	Score
Loss	0–1	May 2016	ITF Plantation, US	Grade 4	Clay	(United States) Alexa Noel	(United States) Alana Smith (United States) Peyton Stearns	2–6, 4–6
Loss	0–2	Feb 2017	ITF Criciúma, Brazil	Grade 1	Clay	(United States) Hailey Baptiste	(United States) Elysia Bolton (United States) Vanessa Ong	6–4, 4–6, [5–10]
Win	1–2	Apr 2017	ITF Indian Wells, US	Grade 1	Hard	(United States) Caty McNally	(United States) Taylor Johnson (United States) Ann Li	6–3, 7–6^{(8)}
Win	2–2	May 2017	ITF Milan, Italy	Grade A	Clay	(United States) Caty McNally	(Chinese Taipei) Cho I-hsuan (Japan) Ayumi Miyamoto	6–3, 7–6^{(5)}
Loss	2–3	Nov 2017	ITF Mexico City	Grade A	Clay	(United States) Ellie Douglas	(United States) Dalayna Hewitt (United States) Peyton Stearns	4–6, 3–6
Win	3–3	Dec 2017	ITF Bradenton, US	Grade 1	Clay	(United States) Caty McNally	(Thailand) Thasaporn Naklo (Japan) Naho Sato	6–3, 6–1
Win	4–3	Jul 2018	ITF Roehampton, UK	Grade 1	Grass	(United States) Caty McNally	(Denmark) Clara Tauson (China) Wang Xinyu	7–6^{(4)}, 7–6^{(7)}

Awards
Preceded by (Russia) Anastasia Potapova	ITF Junior World Champion; 2017	Succeeded by (France) Clara Burel
Sporting positions
Preceded by (Slovenia) Kaja Juvan	Orange Bowl Girls' Singles Champion; Category: 18 and under 2017	Succeeded by (United States) Coco Gauff
