= 2016 Grand Prix SAR La Princesse Lalla Meryem – Doubles =

Doubles
- 2016 Grand Prix SAR La Princesse Lalla Meryem
- 2015 Champions: (Switzerland) Xenia Knoll (Serbia) Aleksandra Krunić

Final
- Runners-up: (Germany) Tatjana Maria (Romania) Raluca Olaru
- Score: 6–3, 6–0

Events
Singles	Doubles
← 2015 ·	Grand Prix SAR La Princesse Lalla Meryem	· 2017 →

Tímea Babos and Kristina Mladenovic were the defending champions, but chose not to participate this year.
Xenia Knoll and Aleksandra Krunić won the title, defeating Tatjana Maria and Raluca Olaru in the final, 6–3, 6–0.

== Seeds ==
The top seeds received a bye into the quarterfinals.

1. (Germany) Tatjana Maria / (Romania) Raluca Olaru (final)
2. (Australia) Anastasia Rodionova / (Australia) Arina Rodionova (quarterfinals)
3. (Germany) Annika Beck / (Sweden) Johanna Larsson (first round)
4. (Switzerland) Xenia Knoll / (Serbia) Aleksandra Krunić (champions)

== Draw ==
=== Key ===
- Q = Qualifier
- WC = Wild card
- LL = Lucky loser
- Alt = Alternate
- SE = Special exempt
- PR = Protected ranking
- ITF = ITF entry
- JE = Junior exempt
- w/o = Walkover
- r = Retired
- d = Defaulted
- SR = Special ranking

First round
(Netherlands) R Hogenkamp (Netherlands) L Kerkhove	6	2	[10]
WC	(Morocco) G Benhadi (Tunisia) O Jabeur	2	6	[5]
3	(Germany) A Beck (Sweden) J Larsson	3	7^{7}	[5]
(Spain) G García Pérez (Bulgaria) A Naydenova	6	6^{5}	[10]
(Russia) M Melnikova (Switzerland) A Sadiković	7	6
(Russia) P Leykina (Kazakhstan) Y Putintseva	5	3
(Slovakia) M Hončová (Latvia) A Sevastova	7^{7}	6
(Romania) A Mitu (Poland) K Piter	6^{2}	1
WC	(Morocco) S Charif (Morocco) A El Fahimi	0	0
4	(Switzerland) X Knoll (Serbia) A Krunić	6	6
(Romania) A Dulgheru (France) P Parmentier	3	1
(Brazil) L Pigossi (Spain) S Sorribes Tormo	6	6
(New Zealand) M Erakovic (Slovakia) D Hantuchová
2	(Australia) An Rodionova (Australia) Ar Rodionova	w/o

Quarterfinals
1	(Germany) T Maria (Romania) R Olaru	4	6	[12]
(Netherlands) R Hogenkamp (Netherlands) L Kerkhove	6	4	[10]
(Spain) G García Pérez (Bulgaria) A Naydenova	1	7	[10]
(Russia) M Melnikova (Switzerland) A Sadiković	6	5	[8]
(Slovakia) M Hončová (Latvia) A Sevastova	5	3
4	(Switzerland) X Knoll (Serbia) A Krunić	7	6
(Brazil) L Pigossi (Spain) S Sorribes Tormo	6	6
2	(Australia) An Rodionova (Australia) Ar Rodionova	2	2

Semifinals
1	(Germany) T Maria (Romania) R Olaru	6	5	[10]
(Spain) G García Pérez (Bulgaria) A Naydenova	2	7	[7]
4	(Switzerland) X Knoll (Serbia) A Krunić	6	5	[10]
(Brazil) L Pigossi (Spain) S Sorribes Tormo	4	7	[6]

Final
1	(Germany) T Maria (Romania) R Olaru	3	0
4	(Switzerland) X Knoll (Serbia) A Krunić	6	6
