= 2016 Grand Prix SAR La Princesse Lalla Meryem – Singles =

Singles
- 2016 Grand Prix SAR La Princesse Lalla Meryem

Final
- Champion: (Switzerland) Timea Bacsinszky
- Runner-up: (New Zealand) Marina Erakovic
- Score: 6–2, 6–1

Events
Singles	Doubles
- Grand Prix SAR La Princesse Lalla Meryem

Elina Svitolina was the defending champion, but chose not to participate this year.

Timea Bacsinszky won the title, defeating Marina Erakovic in the final, 6–2, 6–1.

== Seeds ==
1. (Switzerland) Timea Bacsinszky (champion)
2. (Russia) Ekaterina Makarova (second round)
3. (Slovakia) Anna Karolína Schmiedlová (first round)
4. (Romania) Irina-Camelia Begu (first round)
5. (Hungary) Tímea Babos (semifinals)
6. (Germany) Annika Beck (first round)
7. (Ukraine) Lesia Tsurenko (second round, retired)
8. (Kazakhstan) Yulia Putintseva (quarterfinals)

== Draw ==
Key

- Q = Qualifier
- WC = Wild card
- LL = Lucky loser
- Alt = Alternate
- ITF = ITF entry
- PR = Protected ranking
- SR = Special ranking
- SE = Special exempt
- JE = Junior exempt
- JR = Junior Accelerator Programme entrant
- CO = College Accelerator Programme entrant
- NG = Next Gen Accelerator Program entrant
- w/o = Walkover
- r = Retired
- d = Defaulted

=== Finals ===
Semifinals
1	(Switzerland) Timea Bacsinszky	6	7
5	(Hungary) Tímea Babos	4	5
(Netherlands) Kiki Bertens	6	6^{7}	5
Q	(New Zealand) Marina Erakovic	2	7^{9}	7

Final
1	(Switzerland) Timea Bacsinszky	6	6
Q	(New Zealand) Marina Erakovic	2	1

=== Top half ===
First round
1	(Switzerland) T Bacsinszky	6	6
WC	(Russia) A Blinkova	4	2
Q	(Estonia) K Kanepi	5	1
SE	(Ukraine) K Kozlova	7	6
(Sweden) J Larsson	6	6
(Croatia) D Vekić	2	2
(Brazil) T Pereira	6	6
6	(Germany) A Beck	3	1
4	(Romania) I-C Begu	3	4
LL	(Netherlands) R Hogenkamp	6	6
(France) P Parmentier	7	7
(Belgium) K Flipkens	5	5
PR	(United Kingdom) L Robson	6	6
WC	(Morocco) G Benhadi	1	1
(Slovenia) P Hercog	3	7^{10}	1
5	(Hungary) T Babos	6	6^{8}	6

Second round
1	(Switzerland) T Bacsinszky	6	2	6
SE	(Ukraine) K Kozlova	3	6	3
(Sweden) J Larsson	6	6
(Brazil) T Pereira	4	4
LL	(Netherlands) R Hogenkamp	6	5	2
(France) P Parmentier	4	7	6
PR	(United Kingdom) L Robson	1	2
5	(Hungary) T Babos	6	6

Quarterfinals
1	(Switzerland) T Bacsinszky	6	6
(Sweden) J Larsson	4	1
(France) P Parmentier	3	3
5	(Hungary) T Babos	6	6

Semifinals
1	(Switzerland) T Bacsinszky	6	7
5	(Hungary) T Babos	4	5

=== Bottom half ===
First round
8	(Kazakhstan) Y Putintseva	6	7^{7}
(United States) A Riske	3	6^{1}
(Germany) T Maria	6	6
LL	(Australia) An Rodionova	1	4
WC	(Tunisia) O Jabeur	0	2
LL	(Spain) S Sorribes Tormo	6	6
(Netherlands) K Bertens	6	6
3	(Slovakia) AK Schmiedlová	0	1
7	(Ukraine) L Tsurenko	6	6
Q	(Spain) S Soler Espinosa	4	0
Q	(New Zealand) M Erakovic	6	6
(Romania) A Mitu	2	3
(Latvia) A Sevastova	3	2
Q	(Serbia) A Krunić	6	6
(Romania) A Dulgheru	4	2
2	(Russia) E Makarova	6	6

Second round
8	(Kazakhstan) Y Putintseva	6	6
(Germany) T Maria	0	2
LL	(Spain) S Sorribes Tormo	4	3
(Netherlands) K Bertens	6	6
7	(Ukraine) L Tsurenko	4	0^{r}
Q	(New Zealand) M Erakovic	6	0
Q	(Serbia) A Krunić	6	6
2	(Russia) E Makarova	2	2

Quarterfinals
8	(Kazakhstan) Y Putintseva	3	7^{7}	3
(Netherlands) K Bertens	6	6^{4}	6
Q	(New Zealand) M Erakovic	6	6
Q	(Serbia) A Krunić	4	4

Semifinals
(Netherlands) K Bertens	6	6^{7}	5
Q	(New Zealand) M Erakovic	2	7^{9}	7

== Qualifying ==
=== Seeds ===
1. (Serbia) Aleksandra Krunić (qualified)
2. (Spain) Sílvia Soler Espinosa (qualified)
3. (Ukraine) Kateryna Kozlova (Received a special exempt into the main draw)
4. (Netherlands) Richèl Hogenkamp (qualifying competition, lucky loser)
5. (Switzerland) Amra Sadiković (second round)
6. (Netherlands) Lesley Kerkhove (first round)
7. (Slovakia) Daniela Hantuchová (second round)
8. (Estonia) Kaia Kanepi (qualified)

=== Qualifiers ===
1. (Serbia) Aleksandra Krunić
2. (Spain) Sílvia Soler Espinosa
3. (New Zealand) Marina Erakovic
4. (Estonia) Kaia Kanepi

=== Lucky losers ===
1. (Netherlands) Richèl Hogenkamp
2. (Australia) Anastasia Rodionova
3. (Spain) Sara Sorribes Tormo

=== Draw ===
==== First qualifier ====
First round
(Germany) Jasmin Jebawy	2	0
(Russia) Marina Melnikova	6	6
(Spain) Sara Sorribes Tormo	6	7
(Australia) Arina Rodionova	2	5
(France) Myrtille Georges	3	2
7	(Slovakia) Daniela Hantuchová	6	6

Second round
1	(Serbia) Aleksandra Krunić	6	6
(Russia) Marina Melnikova	1	2
(Spain) Sara Sorribes Tormo	7^{7}	6
7	(Slovakia) Daniela Hantuchová	6^{2}	2

Qualifying competition
1	(Serbia) Aleksandra Krunić	6	7
(Spain) Sara Sorribes Tormo	3	5

==== Second qualifier ====
First round				Second round				Qualifying competition
				2	(Spain) Sílvia Soler Espinosa	6	6
	(Brazil) Laura Pigossi	6	6		(Brazil) Laura Pigossi	2	2
WC	(Morocco) Ikram Rassif	0	0					2	(Spain) Sílvia Soler Espinosa	6^{4}	7^{7}	6
	(Argentina) Nadia Podoroska	1^{r}							(Australia) Anastasia Rodionova	7^{7}	6^{3}	3
	(Australia) Anastasia Rodionova	3			(Australia) Anastasia Rodionova	6	6
				WC	(Morocco) Salma Charif	1	0

==== Third qualifier ====
First round
(Slovakia) Michaela Hončová	4	6	3
(Spain) Georgina García Pérez	6	3	6
(New Zealand) Marina Erakovic	7	6
(Bulgaria) Aleksandrina Naydenova	5	2
(Poland) Katarzyna Piter	3	7^{7}	7
6	(Netherlands) Lesley Kerkhove	6	6^{2}	5

Second round
5	(Switzerland) Amra Sadiković	4	3
(Spain) Georgina García Pérez	6	6
(New Zealand) Marina Erakovic	6	6
(Poland) Katarzyna Piter	4	0

Qualifying competition
(Spain) Georgina García Pérez	6	4	3
(New Zealand) Marina Erakovic	4	6	6

==== Fourth qualifier ====
First round
(Belarus) Aryna Sabalenka	6	7^{7}
(France) Mathilde Johansson	3	6^{3}
WC	(Morocco) Abir El Fahimi	w/o
WC	(Morocco) Zaineb El Houari
(Russia) Polina Leykina	5	2
8	(Estonia) Kaia Kanepi	7	6

Second round
4	(Netherlands) Richèl Hogenkamp	2	6	6
(Belarus) Aryna Sabalenka	6	1	2
WC	(Morocco) Abir El Fahimi	1	1
8	(Estonia) Kaia Kanepi	6	6

Qualifying competition
4	(Netherlands) Richèl Hogenkamp	3	0
8	(Estonia) Kaia Kanepi	6	6
