= 2015 Grand Prix SAR La Princesse Lalla Meryem – Singles =

Singles
- 2015 Grand Prix SAR La Princesse Lalla Meryem

Final
- Champion: (Ukraine) Elina Svitolina
- Runner-up: (Hungary) Tímea Babos
- Score: 7–5, 7–6^{(7–3)}

Events
Singles	Doubles
- Grand Prix SAR La Princesse Lalla Meryem

María Teresa Torró Flor was the defending champion, but withdrew before the tournament began.

Elina Svitolina won the title, defeating Tímea Babos in the final, 7–5, 7–6^{(7–3)}. It was her third WTA Tour title.

== Seeds ==
1. (Spain) Garbiñe Muguruza (second round)
2. (Switzerland) Timea Bacsinszky (quarterfinals)
3. (Italy) Flavia Pennetta (quarterfinals)
4. (Ukraine) Elina Svitolina (champion)
5. (Germany) Mona Barthel (first round)
6. (Italy) Roberta Vinci (second round)
7. (Slovakia) Anna Karolína Schmiedlová (semifinals)
8. (Puerto Rico) Monica Puig (second round)

== Draw ==
Key

- Q = Qualifier
- WC = Wild card
- LL = Lucky loser
- Alt = Alternate
- ITF = ITF entry
- PR = Protected ranking
- SR = Special ranking
- SE = Special exempt
- JE = Junior exempt
- JR = Junior Accelerator Programme entrant
- CO = College Accelerator Programme entrant
- NG = Next Gen Accelerator Program entrant
- w/o = Walkover
- r = Retired
- d = Defaulted

=== Finals ===
Semifinals
(France) Kristina Mladenovic	3	4
(Hungary) Tímea Babos	6	6
4	(Ukraine) Elina Svitolina	6	6
7	(Slovakia) Anna Karolína Schmiedlová	0	3

Final
(Hungary) Tímea Babos	5	6^{3}
4	(Ukraine) Elina Svitolina	7	7^{7}

=== Top half ===
First round
1/WC	(Spain) G Muguruza	6	6
WC	(Russia) D Kasatkina	4	1
(New Zealand) M Erakovic	2	6	3
(France) K Mladenovic	6	3	6
(Spain) L Arruabarrena	7^{7}	6
(Japan) K Nara	6^{3}	4
Q	(Belgium) A Van Uytvanck	0	6^{3}
8	(Puerto Rico) M Puig	6	7^{7}
3	(Italy) F Pennetta	6	6
(Serbia) B Jovanovski	2	3
(France) P Parmentier	2	3
Q	(Germany) L Siegemund	6	6
(Estonia) K Kanepi	3	2
Q	(Brazil) T Pereira	6	6
(Hungary) T Babos	6	6
5	(Germany) M Barthel	4	0

Second round
1/WC	(Spain) G Muguruza	6^{4}	6^{6}
(France) K Mladenovic	7^{7}	7^{8}
(Spain) L Arruabarrena	7	6
8	(Puerto Rico) M Puig	5	2
3	(Italy) F Pennetta	4	6	6
Q	(Germany) L Siegemund	6	1	3
Q	(Brazil) T Pereira	0	7^{7}	4
(Hungary) T Babos	6	6^{5}	6

Quarterfinals
(France) K Mladenovic	6	6
(Spain) L Arruabarrena	4	1
3	(Italy) F Pennetta	2	7	5
(Hungary) T Babos	6	5	7

Semifinals
(France) K Mladenovic	4	4
(Hungary) T Babos	6	6

=== Bottom half ===
First round
6	(Italy) R Vinci	6	6
LL	(Poland) U Radwańska	2	3
(Turkey) Ç Büyükakçay	3	6^{5}
(Italy) K Knapp	6	7^{7}
(United States) C McHale	6	6
(Slovakia) D Hantuchová	4	2
(Croatia) D Vekić	2	2
4	(Ukraine) E Svitolina	6	6
7	(Slovakia) AK Schmiedlová	6	6
(Spain) S Soler Espinosa	4	4
Q	(Argentina) M Irigoyen	6	6
WC	(Morocco) R Atik	0	0
(Germany) C Witthöft	3	2
(Germany) T Maria	6	6
(Russia) E Rodina	3	5
2	(Switzerland) T Bacsinszky	6	7

Second round
6	(Italy) R Vinci	7^{7}	2	2
(Italy) K Knapp	6^{3}	6	6
(United States) C McHale	5	3
4	(Ukraine) E Svitolina	7	6
7	(Slovakia) AK Schmiedlová	3	6	6
Q	(Argentina) M Irigoyen	6	1	3
(Germany) T Maria	6^{3}	3
2	(Switzerland) T Bacsinszky	7^{7}	6

Quarterfinals
(Italy) K Knapp	0	6	3
4	(Ukraine) E Svitolina	6	3	6
7	(Slovakia) AK Schmiedlová	6	3	7
2	(Switzerland) T Bacsinszky	3	6	5

Semifinals
4	(Ukraine) E Svitolina	6	6
7	(Slovakia) AK Schmiedlová	0	3

== Qualifying ==
=== Seeds ===
1. (United States) Alison Riske (first round)
2. (Brazil) Teliana Pereira (qualified)
3. (Belgium) Alison Van Uytvanck (qualified)
4. (Spain) Lourdes Domínguez Lino (first round)
5. (Poland) Urszula Radwańska (qualifying competition, lucky loser)
6. (Ukraine) Maryna Zanevska (first round)
7. (Netherlands) Richèl Hogenkamp (second round)
8. (Russia) Alexandra Panova (first round)

=== Qualifiers ===
1. (Germany) Laura Siegemund
2. (Brazil) Teliana Pereira
3. (Belgium) Alison Van Uytvanck
4. (Argentina) María Irigoyen

=== Lucky losers ===
1. (Poland) Urszula Radwańska

=== Draw ===
==== First qualifier ====
First round
1	(United States) Alison Riske	4	3
(Germany) Laura Siegemund	6	6
(Bulgaria) Elitsa Kostova	6	2	6
(France) Stéphanie Foretz	4	6	3
WC	(Morocco) Zaineb El Houari	1	0
(United States) Alexa Glatch	6	6
(Belgium) Ysaline Bonaventure	6	6
8	(Russia) Alexandra Panova	4	4

Second round
(Germany) Laura Siegemund	6	7
(Bulgaria) Elitsa Kostova	4	5
(United States) Alexa Glatch	6	6
(Belgium) Ysaline Bonaventure	3	2

Qualifying competition
(Germany) Laura Siegemund	6	0
(United States) Alexa Glatch	1	0^{r}

==== Second qualifier ====
First round
2	(Brazil) Teliana Pereira	6	6
(United States) Sanaz Marand	2	0
(Russia) Marina Melnikova	6	6
WC	(Morocco) Ghita Benhadi	0	4
(Czech Republic) Renata Voráčová	6	6
WC	(South Africa) Ilze Hattingh	1	1
(United States) Jan Abaza	3	4
5	(Poland) Urszula Radwańska	6	6

Second round
2	(Brazil) Teliana Pereira	6	6
(Russia) Marina Melnikova	2	2
(Czech Republic) Renata Voráčová	3	3
5	(Poland) Urszula Radwańska	6	6

Qualifying competition
2	(Brazil) Teliana Pereira	6	6
5	(Poland) Urszula Radwańska	3	2

==== Third qualifier ====
First round
3	(Belgium) Alison Van Uytvanck	2
(Spain) Beatriz García Vidagany	0^{r}
(Luxembourg) Mandy Minella	6	1	3
(Spain) Sara Sorribes Tormo	3	6	6
WC	(Romania) Raluca Olaru	2	6^{5}
(France) Manon Arcangioli	6	7^{7}
(Australia) Olivia Rogowska	7^{7}	6
6	(Ukraine) Maryna Zanevska	6^{3}	1

Second round
3	(Belgium) Alison Van Uytvanck	7^{7}	6
(Spain) Sara Sorribes Tormo	6^{2}	4
(France) Manon Arcangioli	2	0
(Australia) Olivia Rogowska	6	6

Qualifying competition
3	(Belgium) Alison Van Uytvanck	6	6
(Australia) Olivia Rogowska	4	4

==== Fourth qualifier ====
First round
4	(Spain) Lourdes Domínguez Lino	4	2
(Ukraine) Olga Savchuk	6	6
(Italy) Alberta Brianti	7	6
(India) Ankita Raina	5	1
(France) Chloé Paquet	3	0
(Argentina) María Irigoyen	6	6
(Switzerland) Xenia Knoll	1	4
7	(Netherlands) Richèl Hogenkamp	6	6

Second round
(Ukraine) Olga Savchuk	6	4	4
(Italy) Alberta Brianti	3	6	6
(Argentina) María Irigoyen	4	6	6
7	(Netherlands) Richèl Hogenkamp	6	1	4

Qualifying competition
(Italy) Alberta Brianti	2	4
(Argentina) María Irigoyen	6	6
