= Morocco Open =

WTA Tour
- Founded: 2001
- Location: Casablanca (2001–2004); Rabat (2005–2006); Fez (2007–2012); Marrakesh (2013–2015); Rabat (since 2016); Morocco
- Venue: Club des Cheminots
- Category: Tier V (2001–2004); Tier IV (2005–2008); International (2009–2020); WTA 250 since 2021)
- Surface: Clay - outdoors
- Draw: 32S / 16Q / 16D
- Prize money: US$283,347 (2026)
- Website: frmt.ma

Current champions (2026)
- Singles: (Croatia) Petra Marčinko
- Doubles: (Hong Kong) Eudice Chong (Belgium) Magali Kempen

The Morocco Open or Grand Prix de SAR La Princesse Lalla Meryem (Arabic: بطولة التنس في المغرب) is an annual WTA Tour professional tennis tournament currently held in Rabat, Morocco. It is classified as a WTA 250-level event and is played on outdoor clay courts. It was founded in 2001 and is currently named after Princesse Lalla Meryem, the first daughter and eldest child of the late King Hassan II of Morocco and his wife, Princess Lalla Latifa.

Tímea Babos is the doubles record holder with three wins. Patricia Wartusch, Émilie Loit, Iveta Benešová, Maya Joint won both singles and doubles titles the same year.

== History ==
The event started in July 2001 in Casablanca, Morocco, it stayed in Casablanca until 2005, when it was moved to Rabat. In 2007, the tournament changed location again, this time to Fez. In 2013 it was relocated to Marrakesh, before returning to Rabat in 2016.

The tournament is named after Princess Lalla Meryem, the sister of Mohammed VI, King of Morocco.

From 2005 through 2008, the tournament was a Tier IV event. Before 2005, it was a Tier V event.

== Past finals ==
=== Singles ===
Location	Year	Champions	Runners-up	Score
Casablanca	2001	(Hungary) Zsófia Gubacsi	(Italy) Maria Elena Camerin	1–6, 6–3, 7–6^{(7–5)}
Casablanca	2002	(Austria) Patricia Wartusch	(Czech Republic) Klára Koukalová	5–7, 6–3, 6–3
Casablanca	2003	(Italy) Rita Grande	(Italy) Antonella Serra Zanetti	6–2, 4–6, 6–1
Casablanca	2004	(France) Émilie Loit	(Slovakia) Ľudmila Cervanová	6–2, 6–2
Rabat	2005	(Spain) Nuria Llagostera Vives	(China) Zheng Jie	6–4, 6–2
Rabat	2006	(United States) Meghann Shaughnessy	(Slovakia) Martina Suchá	6–2, 3–6, 6–3
Fez	2007	(Venezuela) Milagros Sequera	(Canada) Aleksandra Wozniak	6–1, 6–3
Fez	2008	(Argentina) Gisela Dulko	(Spain) Anabel Medina Garrigues	7–6^{(7–2)}, 7–6^{(7–5)}
Fez	2009	(Spain) Anabel Medina Garrigues	(Russia) Ekaterina Makarova	6–0, 6–1
Fez	2010	(Czech Republic) Iveta Benešová	(Romania) Simona Halep	6–4, 6–2
Fez	2011	(Italy) Alberta Brianti	(Romania) Simona Halep	6–4, 6–3
Fez	2012	(Netherlands) Kiki Bertens	(Spain) Laura Pous Tió	7–5, 6–0
Marrakesh	2013	(Italy) Francesca Schiavone	(Spain) Lourdes Domínguez Lino	6–1, 6–3
Marrakesh	2014	(Spain) María Teresa Torró Flor	(Switzerland) Romina Oprandi	6–3, 3–6, 6–3
Marrakesh	2015	(Ukraine) Elina Svitolina	(Hungary) Tímea Babos	7–5, 7–6^{(7–3)}
Rabat	2016	(Switzerland) Timea Bacsinszky	(New Zealand) Marina Erakovic	6–2, 6–1
Rabat	2017	(Russia) Anastasia Pavlyuchenkova	(Italy) Francesca Schiavone	7–5, 7–5
Rabat	2018	(Belgium) Elise Mertens	(Australia) Ajla Tomljanović	6–2, 7–6^{(7–4)}
Rabat	2019	(Greece) Maria Sakkari	(United Kingdom) Johanna Konta	2–6, 6–4, 6–1
Rabat	2020–2021	Not held		
Rabat	2022	(Italy) Martina Trevisan	(United States) Claire Liu	6–2, 6–1
Rabat	2023	(Italy) Lucia Bronzetti	(Austria) Julia Grabher	6–4, 5–7, 7–5
Rabat	2024	(United States) Peyton Stearns	(Egypt) Mayar Sherif	6–2, 6–1
Rabat	2025	(Australia) Maya Joint	(Romania) Jaqueline Cristian	6–3, 6–2
Rabat	2026	(Croatia) Petra Marčinko	(Ukraine) Anhelina Kalinina	6–2, 3–0 ret.

=== Doubles ===
Location	Year	Champions	Runners-up	Score
Casablanca	2001	(Sweden) Åsa Svensson (Bulgaria) Lubomira Bacheva	(Argentina) María Emilia Salerni (Spain) María José Martínez	6–3, 6–7^{(4–7)}, 6–1
Casablanca	2002	(Austria) Patricia Wartusch (Hungary) Petra Mandula	(Argentina) Gisela Dulko (Spain) Conchita Martínez Granados	6–2, 6–1
Casablanca	2003	(Argentina) María Emilia Salerni (Argentina) Gisela Dulko	(Ukraine) Olena Tatarkova (Slovakia) Henrieta Nagyová	6–3, 6–4
Casablanca	2004	(France) Marion Bartoli (France) Émilie Loit	(Slovenia) Katarina Srebotnik (Belgium) Els Callens	6–4, 6–2
Rabat	2005	(France) Émilie Loit (2) (Czech Republic) Barbora Strýcová	(Spain) Lourdes Domínguez (Spain) Nuria Llagostera Vives	3–6, 7–6^{(7–5)}, 7–5
Rabat	2006	(China) Yan Zi (China) Zheng Jie	(United States) Ashley Harkleroad (United States) Bethanie Mattek	6–1, 6–3
Fez	2007	(India) Sania Mirza (United States) Vania King	(Romania) Andreea Ehritt-Vanc (Russia) Anastasia Rodionova	6–1, 6–2
Fez	2008	(Romania) Sorana Cîrstea (Russia) Anastasia Pavlyuchenkova	(Russia) Alisa Kleybanova (Russia) Ekaterina Makarova	6–2, 6–2
Fez	2009	(Russia) Alisa Kleybanova (Russia) Ekaterina Makarova	(Romania) Sorana Cîrstea (Russia) Maria Kirilenko	6–3, 2–6, [10–8]
Fez	2010	(Czech Republic) Iveta Benešová (Spain) Anabel Medina Garrigues	(Czech Republic) Lucie Hradecká (Czech Republic) Renata Voráčová	6–3, 6–1
Fez	2011	(Czech Republic) Andrea Hlaváčková (Czech Republic) Renata Voráčová	(Russia) Nina Bratchikova (Austria) Sandra Klemenschits	6–3, 6–4
Fez	2012	(Czech Republic) Petra Cetkovská (Russia) Alexandra Panova	(Romania) Irina-Camelia Begu (Romania) Alexandra Cadanțu	3–6, 7–6^{(7–5)}, [11–9]
Marrakesh	2013	(Hungary) Tímea Babos (Luxembourg) Mandy Minella	(Croatia) Petra Martić (France) Kristina Mladenovic	6–3, 6–1
Marrakesh	2014	(Spain) Garbiñe Muguruza (Switzerland) Romina Oprandi	(Poland) Katarzyna Piter (Ukraine) Maryna Zanevska	4–6, 6–2, [11-9]
Marrakesh	2015	(Hungary) Tímea Babos (2) (France) Kristina Mladenovic	(Germany) Laura Siegemund (Ukraine) Maryna Zanevska	6–1, 7–6^{(7–5)}
Rabat	2016	(Switzerland) Xenia Knoll (Serbia) Aleksandra Krunić	(Germany) Tatjana Maria (Romania) Raluca Olaru	6–3, 6–0
Rabat	2017	(Hungary) Tímea Babos (3) (Czech Republic) Andrea Hlaváčková (2)	(Serbia) Nina Stojanović (Belgium) Maryna Zanevska	2–6, 6–3, [10–5]
Rabat	2018	(Russia) Anna Blinkova (Romania) Raluca Olaru	(Spain) Georgina García Pérez (Hungary) Fanny Stollár	6–4, 6–4
Rabat	2019	(Spain) María José Martínez Sánchez (Spain) Sara Sorribes Tormo	(Spain) Georgina García Pérez (Georgia (country)) Oksana Kalashnikova	7–5, 6–1
Rabat	2020- 2021	Not held		
Rabat	2022	(Japan) Eri Hozumi (Japan) Makoto Ninomiya	(Romania) Monica Niculescu; Alexandra Panova	6–7^{(7–9)}, 6–3, [10–8]
Rabat	2023	(United States) Sabrina Santamaria; Yana Sizikova	(Brazil) Ingrid Martins; Lidziya Marozava	3–6, 6–1, [10–8]
Rabat	2024	Irina Khromacheva; Yana Sizikova (2)	(Kazakhstan) Anna Danilina (China) Xu Yifan	6–3, 6–2
Rabat	2025	(Australia) Maya Joint (Georgia (country)) Oksana Kalashnikova	(Italy) Angelica Moratelli (Italy) Camilla Rosatello	6–3, 7–5
Rabat	2026	(Hong Kong) Eudice Chong (Belgium) Magali Kempen	(Indonesia) Aldila Sutjiadi; Vera Zvonareva	6–3, 2–6, [10–6]

== See also ==
- List of tennis tournaments
- Grand Prix Hassan II
