= 2016 Grand Prix SAR La Princesse Lalla Meryem =

- Date: 25 – 30 April
- Edition: 16th
- Category: WTA International
- Draw: 32S / 16D
- Prize money: $250,000
- Surface: Clay / outdoor
- Location: Rabat, Morocco
- Venue: Club des Cheminots

Champions

Singles
- (Switzerland) Timea Bacsinszky

Doubles
- (Switzerland) Xenia Knoll / (Serbia) Aleksandra Krunić
- Morocco Open

The 2016 Grand Prix SAR La Princesse Lalla Meryem was a women's professional tennis tournament played on clay courts. It was the 16th edition of the tournament and part of the WTA International tournaments category of the 2016 WTA Tour. It took place in Rabat, Morocco, between 25 and 30 April 2016.

== Point distribution ==
Event	W	F	SF	QF	Round of 16	Round of 32	Q	Q3	Q2	Q1
Women's singles	280	180	110	60	30	1	18	14	10	1
Women's doubles	280	180	110	60	1	—N/a	—N/a	—N/a	—N/a	—N/a

== Singles main draw entrants ==
=== Seeds ===
Country	Player	Rank^{1}	Seed
SUI	Timea Bacsinszky	16	1
RUS	Ekaterina Makarova	29	2
SVK	Anna Karolína Schmiedlová	34	3
ROU	Irina-Camelia Begu	35	4
HUN	Tímea Babos	40	5
GER	Annika Beck	41	6
UKR	Lesia Tsurenko	43	7
KAZ	Yulia Putintseva	53	8

- ^{1} Rankings as of April 18, 2016

=== Other entrants ===
The following players received wildcards into the singles main draw:

- (Morocco) Ghita Benhadi
- (Russia) Anna Blinkova
- (Tunisia) Ons Jabeur

The following players received entry as qualifiers:

- (New Zealand) Marina Erakovic
- (Estonia) Kaia Kanepi
- (Serbia) Aleksandra Krunić
- (Spain) Sílvia Soler Espinosa

The following player received entry as a special exempt:

- (Ukraine) Kateryna Kozlova

The following player entered by a protected ranking:

- (United Kingdom) Laura Robson

The following players received entry as lucky losers:

- (Netherlands) Richèl Hogenkamp
- (Australia) Anastasia Rodionova
- (Spain) Sara Sorribes Tormo

=== Withdrawals ===
Before the tournament

- (Ukraine) Kateryna Bondarenko → replaced by (Romania) Andreea Mitu
- (Turkey) Çağla Büyükakçay → replaced by (Australia) Anastasia Rodionova
- (Japan) Misaki Doi → replaced by (United States) Alison Riske
- (United States) Irina Falconi → replaced by (Latvia) Anastasija Sevastova
- (Japan) Nao Hibino → replaced by (Netherlands) Kiki Bertens
- (Serbia) Bojana Jovanovski → replaced by (Romania) Alexandra Dulgheru
- (Italy) Karin Knapp → replaced by (Netherlands) Richèl Hogenkamp
- (United Kingdom) Johanna Konta → replaced by (Germany) Tatjana Maria
- (Germany) Laura Siegemund → replaced by (Spain) Sara Sorribes Tormo
- (Russia) Elena Vesnina → replaced by (Croatia) Donna Vekić

=== Retirements ===
- (Ukraine) Lesia Tsurenko

== Doubles main draw entrants ==
=== Seeds ===
Country	Player	Country	Player	Rank^{1}	Seed
GER	Tatjana Maria	ROU	Raluca Olaru	110	1
AUS	Anastasia Rodionova	AUS	Arina Rodionova	117	2
GER	Annika Beck	SWE	Johanna Larsson	162	3
SUI	Xenia Knoll	SRB	Aleksandra Krunić	210	4

- ^{1} Rankings as of April 18, 2016

=== Other entrants ===
The following pairs received wildcards into the doubles main draw:

- (Morocco) Ghita Benhadi / (Tunisia) Ons Jabeur
- (Morocco) Salma Charif / (Morocco) Abir El Fahimi

=== Withdrawals ===
During the tournament

- (Slovakia) Daniela Hantuchová

== Champions ==
=== Singles ===
- (Switzerland) Timea Bacsinszky def. (New Zealand) Marina Erakovic, 6–2, 6–1

=== Doubles ===
- (Switzerland) Xenia Knoll / (Serbia) Aleksandra Krunić def. (Germany) Tatjana Maria / (Romania) Raluca Olaru 6–3, 6–0.
