= 2015 Grand Prix SAR La Princesse Lalla Meryem – Doubles =

Doubles
- 2015 Grand Prix SAR La Princesse Lalla Meryem

Final
- Champions: (Hungary) Tímea Babos (France) Kristina Mladenovic
- Runners-up: (Germany) Laura Siegemund (Ukraine) Maryna Zanevska
- Score: 6–1, 7–6^{(7–5)}

Events
Singles	Doubles
← 2014 ·	Grand Prix SAR La Princesse Lalla Meryem	· 2016 →

Garbiñe Muguruza and Romina Oprandi were the defending champions, but they chose not to participate this year.
Tímea Babos and Kristina Mladenovic won the title, defeating Laura Siegemund and Maryna Zanevska in the final, 6–1, 7–6^{(7–5)}.

== Seeds ==
1. (Hungary) Tímea Babos / (France) Kristina Mladenovic (champions)
2. (Croatia) Darija Jurak / (Spain) Arantxa Parra Santonja (quarterfinals)
3. (Russia) Alexandra Panova / (Czech Republic) Renata Voráčová (first round)
4. (Romania) Raluca Olaru / (Spain) Sílvia Soler Espinosa (quarterfinals)

== Draw ==
=== Key ===
- Q = Qualifier
- WC = Wild card
- LL = Lucky loser
- Alt = Alternate
- SE = Special exempt
- PR = Protected ranking
- ITF = ITF entry
- JE = Junior exempt
- w/o = Walkover
- r = Retired
- d = Defaulted
- SR = Special ranking

=== Draw ===
First round
1	(Hungary) T Babos (France) K Mladenovic	6	6
WC	(Morocco) R Atik (Morocco) Z El Houari	1	1
(United Kingdom) J Rae (United Kingdom) A Smith	4	7^{7}	[9]
(Belgium) Y Bonaventure (Netherlands) D Schuurs	6	6^{1}	[11]
3	(Russia) A Panova (Czech Republic) R Voráčová	4	6^{3}
(France) S Foretz (France) P Parmentier	6	7^{7}
(Austria) S Klemenschits (Germany) T Maria	7	7^{7}
(Argentina) T Búa (Chile) D Seguel	5	6^{5}
WC	(Morocco) G Benhadi (South Africa) I Hattingh	1	0
(Ukraine) O Savchuk (Ukraine) E Svitolina	6	6
(Germany) M Barthel (Luxembourg) M Minella	2	4
4	(Romania) R Olaru (Spain) S Soler Espinosa	6	6
(Spain) L Arruabarrena (Argentina) M Irigoyen	6	1	[8]
(Germany) L Siegemund (Ukraine) M Zanevska	3	6	[10]
(United States) A Riske (Belgium) A Van Uytvanck	5	6	[5]
2	(Croatia) D Jurak (Spain) A Parra Santonja	7	0	[10]

Quarterfinals
1	(Hungary) T Babos (France) K Mladenovic	7	7
(Belgium) Y Bonaventure (Netherlands) D Schuurs	5	5
(France) S Foretz (France) P Parmentier	6^{6}	3
(Austria) S Klemenschits (Germany) T Maria	7^{8}	6
(Ukraine) O Savchuk (Ukraine) E Svitolina	6	6^{7}	[10]
4	(Romania) R Olaru (Spain) S Soler Espinosa	4	7^{9}	[7]
(Germany) L Siegemund (Ukraine) M Zanevska	6	6
2	(Croatia) D Jurak (Spain) A Parra Santonja	4	2

Semifinals
1	(Hungary) T Babos (France) K Mladenovic	7	6
(Austria) S Klemenschits (Germany) T Maria	5	2
(Ukraine) O Savchuk (Ukraine) E Svitolina	1	1
(Germany) L Siegemund (Ukraine) M Zanevska	6	6

Final
1	(Hungary) T Babos (France) K Mladenovic	6	7^{7}
(Germany) L Siegemund (Ukraine) M Zanevska	1	6^{5}
