= Polina Leykina =

Russian tennis player (born 1994)

Polina Leykina Полина Лейкина
- Full name: Polina Alekseyevna Leykina
- Country (sports): Russia
- Born: 20 September 1994 (age 32) Moscow, Russia
- Plays: Right (two-handed backhand)
- Prize money: $191,718

Singles
- Career record: 413–311
- Career titles: 13 ITF
- Highest ranking: No. 184 (1 August 2016)
- Current ranking: No. 632 (31 August 2026)

Grand Slam singles results
- French Open: Q1 (2016)
- Wimbledon: Q1 (2016)
- US Open: Q1 (2016)

Doubles
- Career record: 224–210
- Career titles: 19 ITF
- Highest ranking: No. 230 (28 December 2015)
- Current ranking: No. 972 (31 August 2026)
- Last updated on: 3 September 2026.

Polina Alekseyevna Leykina (Russian: Полина Алексеевна Лейкина; born 20 September 1994) is a Russian tennis player.

She has career-high WTA rankings of 184 in singles, achieved on 1 August 2016, and 230 in doubles, set on 28 December 2015. Leykina has won 13 singles titles and 19 doubles titles on the ITF Women's Circuit.

== Early and personal life ==
Leykina was born in Moscow, Russia. She started playing tennis at the age of seven on the initiative of her father. Her father first sent her to badminton, but later changed his mind. In addition to her passion for sports, she enjoys reading books, walking in nature with friends, and traveling.

== Career ==
In September 2015, she became the champion at the W25 tournament held in Clermont-Ferrand, France, defeating Swiss player Viktorija Golubic in the final.

She made her WTA Tour main-draw debut at the 2016 Morocco Open, in the doubles event, partnering with Yulia Putintseva.

In July 2016, she advanced to the second round of the main draw at the 2016 BRD Bucharest Open, a WTA Tour event in Romania, by defeating Chinese tennis player Xu Shilin in the first round. She was defeated by number six seeded Montenegrin Danka Kovinić in the second round.

== Performance timeline ==
Key
W	F	SF	QF	#R	RR	Q#	DNQ	A	NH

(W) winner; (F) finalist; (SF) semifinalist; (QF) quarterfinalist; (#R) rounds 4, 3, 2, 1; (RR) round-robin stage; (Q#) qualification round; (DNQ) did not qualify; (A) absent; (NH) not held; (SR) strike rate (events won / competed); (W–L) win–loss record.

=== Singles ===
Tournament	2016	SR	W–L	Win %
Grand Slam tournaments
Australian Open	A	0 / 0	0–0	–
French Open	Q1	0 / 0	0–0	–
Wimbledon	Q1	0 / 0	0–0	–
US Open	Q1	0 / 0	0–0	–
Win–loss	0–0	0 / 0	0–0	–

== ITF Circuit finals ==
=== Singles: 21 (13 titles, 8 runner-ups) ===
Legend W25/35 tournaments (4–2) W10/15 tournaments (9–6)	Finals by surface Hard (7–4) Clay (6–4)

Result	W–L	Date	Tournament	Tier	Surface	Opponent	Score
Loss	0–1	Oct 2012	ITF Dubrovnik, Croatia	10,000	Clay	(Czech Republic) Barbora Krejčíková	4–6, 1–6
Loss	0–2	Feb 2013	ITF Netanya, Israel	10,000	Hard	(Russia) Natela Dzalamidze	4–6, 3–6
Win	1–2	Sep 2013	ITF Athens, Greece	10,000	Hard	(Chinese Taipei) Lee Pei-chi	5–7, 6–4, 6–3
Loss	1–3	Jan 2014	ITF Sharm El Sheikh, Egypt	10,000	Hard	(Hong Kong) Zhang Ling	1–6, 5–7
Win	2–3	Mar 2014	ITF Heraklion, Greece	10,000	Hard	(Croatia) Ema Mikulčić	6–2, 6–7^{(3)}, 7–5
Win	3–3	May 2014	ITF Sharm El Sheikh, Egypt	10,000	Hard	(Serbia) Nina Stojanović	6–2, 2–6, 6–2
Win	4–3	Jun 2014	ITF Civitavecchia, Italy	10,000	Clay	(Italy) Martina Caregaro	7–5, 6–4
Win	5–3	Oct 2014	ITF Sharm El Sheikh, Egypt	10,000	Hard	(Switzerland) Jil Teichmann	6–2, 6–0
Win	6–3	Jul 2015	ITF Knokke, Belgium	10,000	Clay	(Belgium) Sofie Oyen	6–4, 6–2
Win	7–3	Aug 2015	Neva Cup St. Petersburg, Russia	25,000	Clay	(Russia) Natalia Vikhlyantseva	6–4, 6–3
Loss	7–4	Sep 2015	ITF Dobrich, Bulgaria	25,000	Clay	(Slovenia) Tamara Zidanšek	3–6, 2–6
Win	8–4	Sep 2015	ITF Clermont-Ferrand, France	25,000	Hard (i)	(Switzerland) Viktorija Golubic	4–6, 6–3, 6–4
Loss	8–5	Aug 2017	ITF Moscow, Russia	15,000	Clay	(Belarus) Iryna Shymanovich	2–6, 4–6
Win	9–5	Sep 2017	ITF Almaty, Kazakhstan	25,000	Clay	(Uzbekistan) Akgul Amanmuradova	6–3, 6–3
Loss	9–6	Oct 2018	ITF Pula, Italy	25,000	Clay	(Slovenia) Kaja Juvan	6–3, 1–6, 2–6
Win	10–6	May 2021	ITF Antalya, Turkey	W15	Clay	(Russia) Julia Avdeeva	6–1, 6–0
Win	11–6	Aug 2022	ITF Bad Waltersdorf, Austria	W15	Clay	(Slovenia) Pia Lovrič	6–2, 6–3
Loss	11–7	Aug 2023	ITF Baku, Azerbaijan	W15	Hard	(France) Yaroslava Bartashevich	5–7, 4–6
Loss	11–8	Jul 2025	ITF Hillcrest, South Africa	W15	Hard	Kira Pavlova	4–6, 6–2, 2–6
Win	12–8	Jun 2026	ITF Hillcrest, South Africa	W15	Hard	(Switzerland) Jenny Dürst	6–4, 6–4
Win	13–8	Jul 2026	ITF Hillcrest, South Africa	W35	Hard	(Egypt) Jana Hossam Salah	6–4, 6–2

=== Doubles: 36 (19 titles, 17 runner-ups) ===
Legend W25/35 tournaments W10/15 tournaments	Finals by surface Hard (10–11) Clay (9–6)

Result	W–L	Date	Tournament	Tier	Surface	Partner	Opponents	Score
Loss	0–1	Feb 2012	ITF Sharm El Sheikh, Egypt	10,000	Hard	(Russia) Sofia Dmitrieva	(Russia) Natela Dzalamidze (Ukraine) Khristina Kazimova	0–6, 6–7^{(4)}
Win	1–1	Feb 2013	ITF Netanya, Israel	10,000	Hard	(Ukraine) Oleksandra Korashvili	(Russia) Natela Dzalamidze (Russia) Aminat Kushkhova	6–4, 6–2
Win	2–1	Mar 2013	ITF Netanya, Israel	10,000	Hard	(Belarus) Aliaksandra Sasnovich	(Russia) Natela Dzalamidze (Russia) Aminat Kushkhova	2–6, 7–6^{(4)}, [10–8]
Win	3–1	Apr 2013	ITF Bol, Croatia	10,000	Clay	(Czech Republic) Barbora Krejčíková	(Croatia) Jana Fett (United States) Bernarda Pera	6–3, 6–3
Win	4–1	Apr 2013	ITF Šibenik, Croatia	10,000	Clay	(Czech Republic) Barbora Krejčíková	(Netherlands) Cindy Burger (Germany) Anna Klasen	3–6, 6–3, [12–10]
Loss	4–2	Jun 2013	ITF Istanbul, Turkey	10,000	Hard	(Belarus) Lidziya Marozava	(Germany) Christina Shakovets (Bulgaria) Julia Stamatova	2–6, 0–6
Win	5–2	Jul 2013	ITF Istanbul, Turkey	10,000	Hard	(Belarus) Lidziya Marozava	(Ukraine) Maryna Kolb (Ukraine) Nadiya Kolb	7–6^{(2)}, 7–5
Win	6–2	Jul 2013	ITF Izmir, Turkey	10,000	Hard	(Estonia) Anett Kontaveit	(Turkey) Hülya Esen (Turkey) Lütfiye Esen	6–4, 7–5
Win	7–2	Sep 2013	ITF Vrnjacka Banja, Serbia	10,000	Clay	(North Macedonia) Lina Gjorcheska	(Slovakia) Rebecca Šramková (Slovakia) Natalia Vajdová	6–4, 6–3
Win	8–2	Sep 2013	ITF Athens, Greece	10,000	Hard	(Russia) Aminat Kushkhova	(Germany) Franziska Koenig (Switzerland) Lisa Sabino	7–5, 6–3
Loss	8–3	Oct 2013	ITF Athens, Greece	10,000	Hard	(Belarus) Darya Shulzhanok	(United Kingdom) Lucy Brown (Germany) Alina Wessel	0–6, 3–6
Loss	8–4	Jan 2014	ITF Sharm El Sheikh, Egypt	10,000	Hard	(Greece) Despina Papamichail	(Ukraine) Valentyna Ivakhnenko (Ukraine) Veronika Kapshay	6–7, 2–6
Loss	8–5	Mar 2014	ITF Shenzhen, China	10,000	Hard	(Russia) Natela Dzalamidze	(South Korea) Han Na-lae (South Korea) Yoo Mi	1–6, 1–6
Loss	8–6	Mar 2014	ITF Heraklion, Greece	10,000	Hard	(Greece) Valentini Grammatikopoulou	(Hungary) Csilla Borsányi (Romania) Ilka Csöregi	6–4, 3–6, [6–10]
Win	9–6	Apr 2014	ITF Heraklion, Greece	10,000	Hard	(Greece) Despina Papamichail	(Belgium) Marie Benoît (Belgium) Kimberley Zimmermann	6–2, 6–2
Loss	9–7	May 2014	ITF Sharm El Sheikh, Egypt	10,000	Hard	(United Kingdom) Lucy Brown	(Switzerland) Lisa Sabino (Serbia) Nina Stojanović	3–6, 6–4, [3–10]
Loss	9–8	Aug 2014	ITF Leipzig, Germany	10,000	Clay	(Ukraine) Diana Bogoliy	(Russia) Olga Doroshina (Switzerland) Conny Perrin	5–7, 4–6
Loss	9–9	Aug 2014	ITF Braunschweig, Germany	10,000	Clay	(Bulgaria) Isabella Shinikova	(Switzerland) Conny Perrin (South Africa) Chanel Simmonds	3–6, 0–6
Win	10–9	Oct 2014	ITF Sharm El Sheikh, Egypt	10,000	Hard	(Ukraine) Diana Bogoliy	(Italy) Giulia Bruzzone (Romania) Elena-Teodora Cadar	6–2, 6–1
Loss	10–10	Feb 2015	ITF Sharm El Sheikh, Egypt	10,000	Hard	(Ukraine) Diana Bogoliy	(Kazakhstan) Kamila Kerimbayeva (Russia) Aminat Kushkhova	3–6, 1–6
Win	11–10	Jun 2015	ITF Moscow, Russia	25,000	Clay	(Russia) Irina Khromacheva	(Ukraine) Alona Fomina (Ukraine) Anastasiya Vasylyeva	7–5, 7–5
Win	12–10	Aug 2015	ITF Kazan, Russia	10,000	Clay	(Ukraine) Oleksandra Korashvili	(Russia) Anastasia Frolova (Uzbekistan) Polina Merenkova	walkover
Win	13–10	Oct 2015	ITF Istanbul, Turkey	25,000	Hard (i)	(Turkey) Başak Eraydın	(Romania) Cristina Dinu (Croatia) Jana Fett	7–5, 6–7^{(2)}, [10–5]
Loss	13–11	Dec 2015	ITF Navi Mumbai, India	25,000	Hard	(China) Lu Jiajing	(Russia) Anna Morgina (Serbia) Nina Stojanović	3–6, 5–7
Win	14–11	Jul 2018	ITF Aschaffenburg, Germany	25,000	Clay	(Bulgaria) Isabella Shinikova	(Finland) Emma Laine (United States) Chiara Scholl	7–6^{(4)}, 7–5
Win	15–11	Aug 2019	ITF Braunschweig, Germany	25,000	Clay	(France) Marine Partaud	(Uzbekistan) Akgul Amanmuradova (Uzbekistan) Albina Khabibulina	6–4, 1–6, [10–5]
Loss	15–12	Nov 2019	ITF Heraklion, Greece	15,000	Clay	(Spain) Claudia Hoste Ferrer	(Spain) Alba Carrillo Marín (Spain) Celia Cerviño Ruiz	6–7^{(6)}, 1–6
Win	16–12	Dec 2022	ITF Oberpullendorf, Austria	15,000	Hard (i)	(Israel) Sofiia Nagornaia	(Austria) Veronika Bokor (Bosnia and Herzegovina) Laura Radaković	6–4, 7–6^{(9)}
Win	17–12	Jan 2023	ITF Antalya, Turkey	15,000	Clay	(Russia) Ekaterina Ovcharenko	(United States) Hurricane Tyra Black (Turkey) Doğa Türkmen	6–2, 3–6, [10–4]
Loss	17–13	Jul 2023	ITF Prokuplje, Serbia	W25	Clay	(Bulgaria) Julia Stamatova	(Romania) Cristina Dinu (Ukraine) Valeriya Strakhova	6–4, 2–6, [8–10]
Loss	17–14	Aug 2023	ITF Baku, Azerbaijan	W15	Hard	(Russia) Nadezda Khalturina	(Kazakhstan) Mariya Sinitsyna (Kyrgyzstan) Arina Solomatina	1–6, 6–7^{(5)}
Win	18–14	Mar 2024	ITF Heraklion, Greece	W15	Clay	(Germany) Katharina Hobgarski	(Italy) Irene Lavino (Greece) Sapfo Sakellaridi	4–6, 6–1, [10–3]
Loss	18–15	Oct 2024	ITF Heraklion, Greece	W35	Clay	(Russia) Elina Nepliy	(Romania) Ilinca Amariei (Greece) Elena Korokozidi	3–6, 3–6
Loss	18–16	May 2025	ITF Monastir, Tunisia	W15	Hard	(Slovakia) Mia Chudejová	(United Kingdom) Alicia Dudeney (Lithuania) Patricija Paukštytė	0–6, 4–6
Win	19–16	Jun 2025	ITF Hillcrest, South Africa	W15	Hard	(France) Astrid Cirotte	(Benin) Gloriana Nahum (China) Zhao Yichen	6–4, 6–3
Loss	19–17	Jul 2026	ITF Hillcrest, South Africa	W35	Hard	Ksenia Smirnova	(France) Astrid Cirotte (Switzerland) Jenny Dürst	6–4, 2–6, [7–10]
