= Timea Bacsinszky =

Swiss professional tennis player

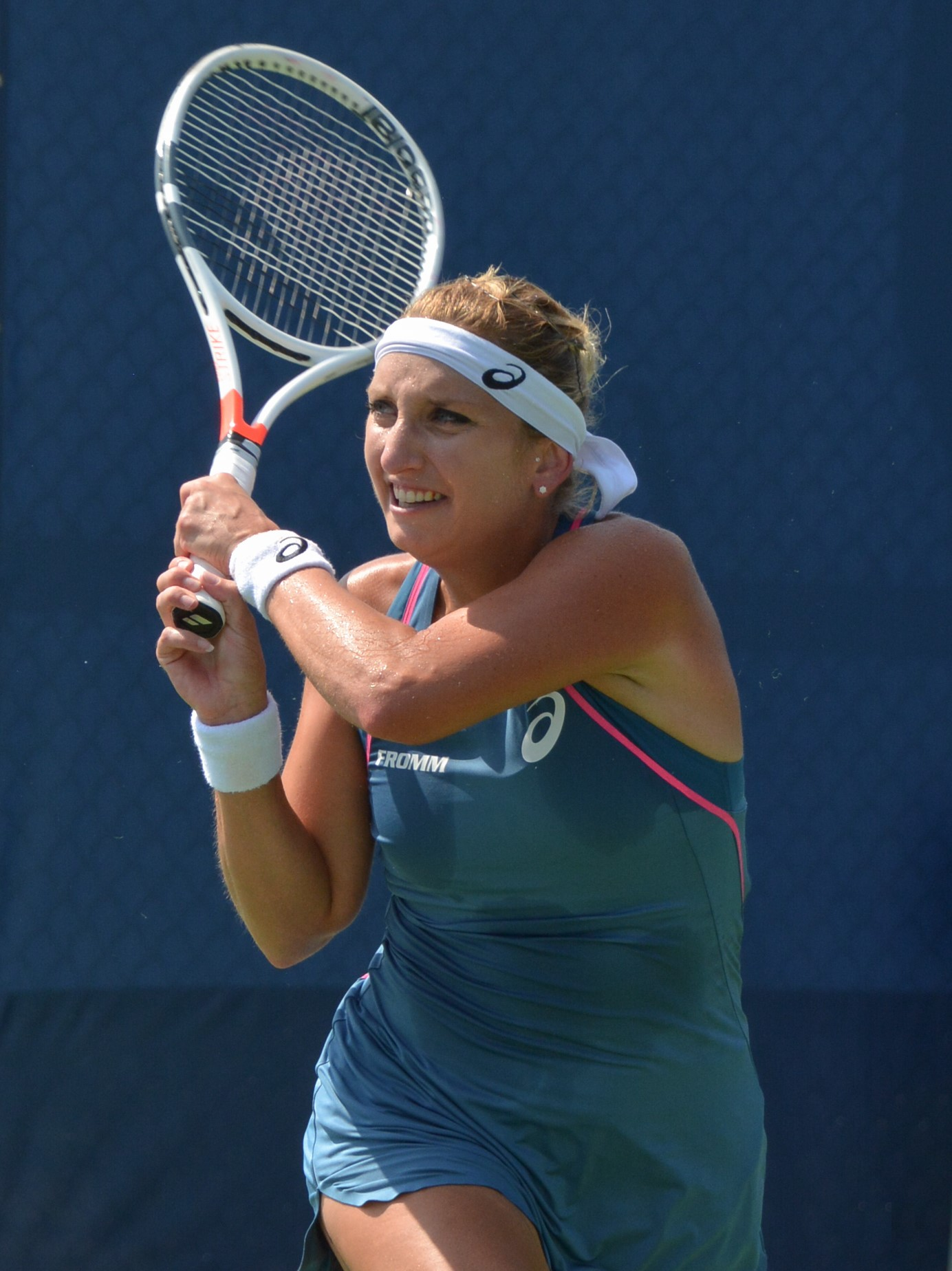
- Bacsinszky at the 2018 US Open
- Country (sports): Switzerland
- Residence: Belmont-sur-Lausanne, Switzerland
- Born: 8 June 1989 (age 37) Lausanne, Switzerland
- Height: 1.70 m (5 ft 7 in)
- Turned pro: October 2004
- Retired: 16 July 2021
- Plays: Right-handed (two-handed backhand)
- Prize money: US$ 6,665,011
- Official website: timea-b.com

Singles
- Career record: 422–246
- Career titles: 4
- Highest ranking: No. 9 (16 May 2016)

Grand Slam singles results
- Australian Open: 3R (2015, 2017, 2019)
- French Open: SF (2015, 2017)
- Wimbledon: QF (2015)
- US Open: 3R (2008)

Other tournaments
- Olympic Games: 1R (2008, 2016)

Doubles
- Career record: 171–106
- Career titles: 5
- Highest ranking: No. 36 (31 January 2011)

Grand Slam doubles results
- Australian Open: 2R (2010, 2011)
- French Open: 2R (2008, 2015)
- Wimbledon: 2R (2010)
- US Open: 3R (2010, 2018)

Other doubles tournaments
- Olympic Games: F (2016)

Grand Slam mixed doubles results
- Wimbledon: 1R (2010)
- US Open: 1R (2010)

Team competitions
- Fed Cup: 28–25
Medal record
Olympic Games
| Silver medal – second place | 2016 Rio de Janeiro | Doubles |

Timea Bacsinszky (Hungarian: Bacsinszky Tímea; born 8 June 1989) is a Swiss former professional tennis player. A top ten singles player, Bacsinszky reached a career-high singles ranking of world No. 9, on 16 May 2016. She won four singles and five doubles titles on the WTA Tour, as well as 13 singles and 14 doubles titles on the ITF Circuit

A former prodigy on the junior tennis circuit, Bacsinszky semi-retired from tennis in 2011 at the age of 22 following a major foot injury. After playing a qualifying match at the 2013 French Open, she made a full comeback onto the WTA Tour in 2014 with success, winning her opening-round match at three of the major events and upsetting world No. 4 and five-time Grand Slam winner Maria Sharapova en route to the quarterfinals in Wuhan, earning her a first ever year-end top 50 ranking. Her breakthrough year in singles came in 2015, winning a career-best 15 consecutive matches spanning two titles, upsetting Madison Keys and Petra Kvitová en route to the semifinals of the French Open (the first time she advanced past the third round of a major), reaching her first Premier Mandatory final at the China Open, and becoming the first Swiss female tennis player to be ranked in the top 10 since Martina Hingis in 2007. Bacsinszky received the WTA Most Improved Player of the Year award for her massive singles rise that year. She once again reached the semifinals of the French Open in 2017. She also reached the quarterfinals of Wimbledon in 2015, and of the French Open in 2016. Bacsinszky announced on 16 July 2021 that she had retired from the sport.

Representing Switzerland, Bacsinszky has a Fed Cup career match record of 28–25. She won a silver medal in women's doubles at the 2016 Summer Olympics in Rio de Janeiro, partnering Hingis.

== Personal life ==
Bacsinszky, who first picked up a racket at age 5, was pushed hard to succeed in youth tennis by her father Igor, a tennis coach from Satu Mare County, Transylvania, who escaped Ceaușescu's Romania to Switzerland in 1982. She has stated that she resented him for this and remains estranged from him after her parents divorced, though she still developed a passion for competitive tennis. Her mother, Suzanne (Zsuzsanna in Hungarian), is a dentist from Debrecen, Hungary. As both her parents are Hungarian, she had thought about representing Hungary at international level. She has one brother, Daniel, a music teacher and member of The Evpatoria Report, and two sisters, Sophie (musician and student) and Melinda. While growing up, Bacsinszky idolized Monica Seles. She spent part of her childhood in Satu Mare, visiting friends and family.

== Tennis career ==
=== 2004–10: early years ===
Bacsinszky's early tennis highlights included reaching the semifinals of three junior Grand Slam tournaments in 2004–05. Her breakthrough professional tournament was the 2006 Zurich Open, where she qualified then defeated Anastasia Myskina and Francesca Schiavone before losing to former No. 1, Maria Sharapova. Her early years on tour were a learning experience, and she finished both 2006 and 2007 ranked in the 120s.

Her singles ranking climbed in 2008, and she finished in the top 60 three straight years. Most important was reaching the semifinals of the Diamond Games in February, winning three qualifying and several main draw matches, before losing to world No. 1, Justine Henin, in three sets. She won her first WTA singles title at the 2009 Luxembourg Open, then won her first three doubles titles the following year.

=== 2011–14: injury and return ===
Bacsinszky suffered a serious foot injury in the spring of 2011, requiring surgery and a long recovery. She returned at the Fed Cup the following February then used her protected ranking to play several WTA tournaments. She also played a number of ITF Women's Circuit events. However, she decided to skip the Olympics for personal reasons and soon took a hiatus from tennis altogether. She ended up working in restaurants and bars while preparing to attend hotel management school.

In May 2013, Bacsinszky received an email, stating she was eligible to compete in that month's French Open qualifier. With no practice and having to take time off work, she drove from Lausanne to Paris; she lost her first match but felt her passion for the game reignited. Thus she hired Dimitri Zavialoff, former coach of compatriot Stan Wawrinka, and committed herself to reviving her tennis career. Her gradual return to the WTA Tour reached a big milestone at the 2014 Wuhan Open when she upset No. 4, Maria Sharapova, in the third round. A few weeks later, she won her fourth career doubles title.

=== 2015: top-10 debut and first major semifinal ===
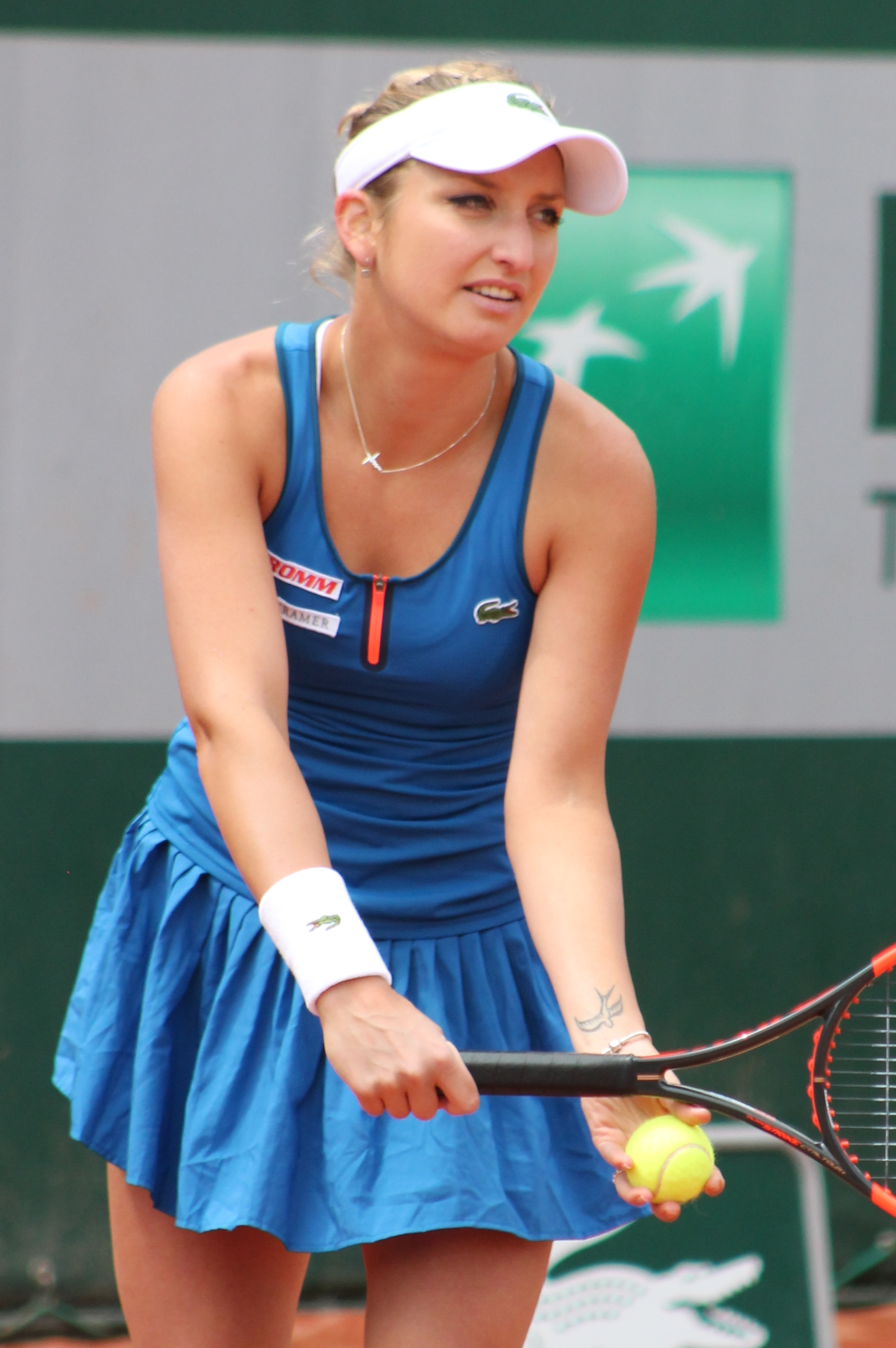
Bacsinszky at the 2015 French Open

Bacsinszky opened season in Shenzhen, upsetting No. 4 Petra Kvitová in the semifinal, before losing to No. 3, Simona Halep, in her first WTA Tour final in five years. She then reached the third round of the Australian Open followed by back-to-back titles in Mexico at Acapulco and Monterrey, beating Caroline Garcia in both finals. As a result, her ranking rose into the top 30 for the first time. She continued this good form at the Premier Mandatory event in Indian Wells, defeating No. 8 Ekaterina Makarova en route to the quarterfinals where she lost to No. 1, Serena Williams, thereby ending her win streak at a career-best 15 matches.

At the French Open she advanced past the third round of a Grand Slam tournament for the first time, once again upsetting Kvitová. She made it all the way to the semifinals and a rematch with top-seeded Williams; Bacsinszky led by a set and a break but lost the last ten games. Then, after making the quarterfinals of Wimbledon, her ranking rose to 13.

The US Open Series, however, saw unstable results for her, falling in the first round of all four tournaments she entered, including losing to Barbora Strýcová in her opening match at the US Open. Entering the China Open in poor form, Bacsinszky beat Italian Camila Giorgi, qualifier Mariana Duque-Marino, and three former top-10 players including Carla Suárez Navarro, Sara Errani and Ana Ivanovic to advance her first ever Premier-Mandatory final where she lost to Garbiñe Muguruza in straight sets. Her run to the final put her in the top 10 in the WTA rankings for the first time.

She lost out on her run to the WTA Finals, however, because the last tournament she played (Luxembourg) held its final on Saturday and the points could not count for the race. She withdrew from the WTA Elite Trophy due to a left knee injury that had already forced her retirement in her first round match in Luxembourg. After the end of the season, Bacsinszky received the WTA's Most Improved Player Award, ending the year No. 12 in the rankings.

=== 2016: fourth singles title and Olympic silver medal in doubles ===
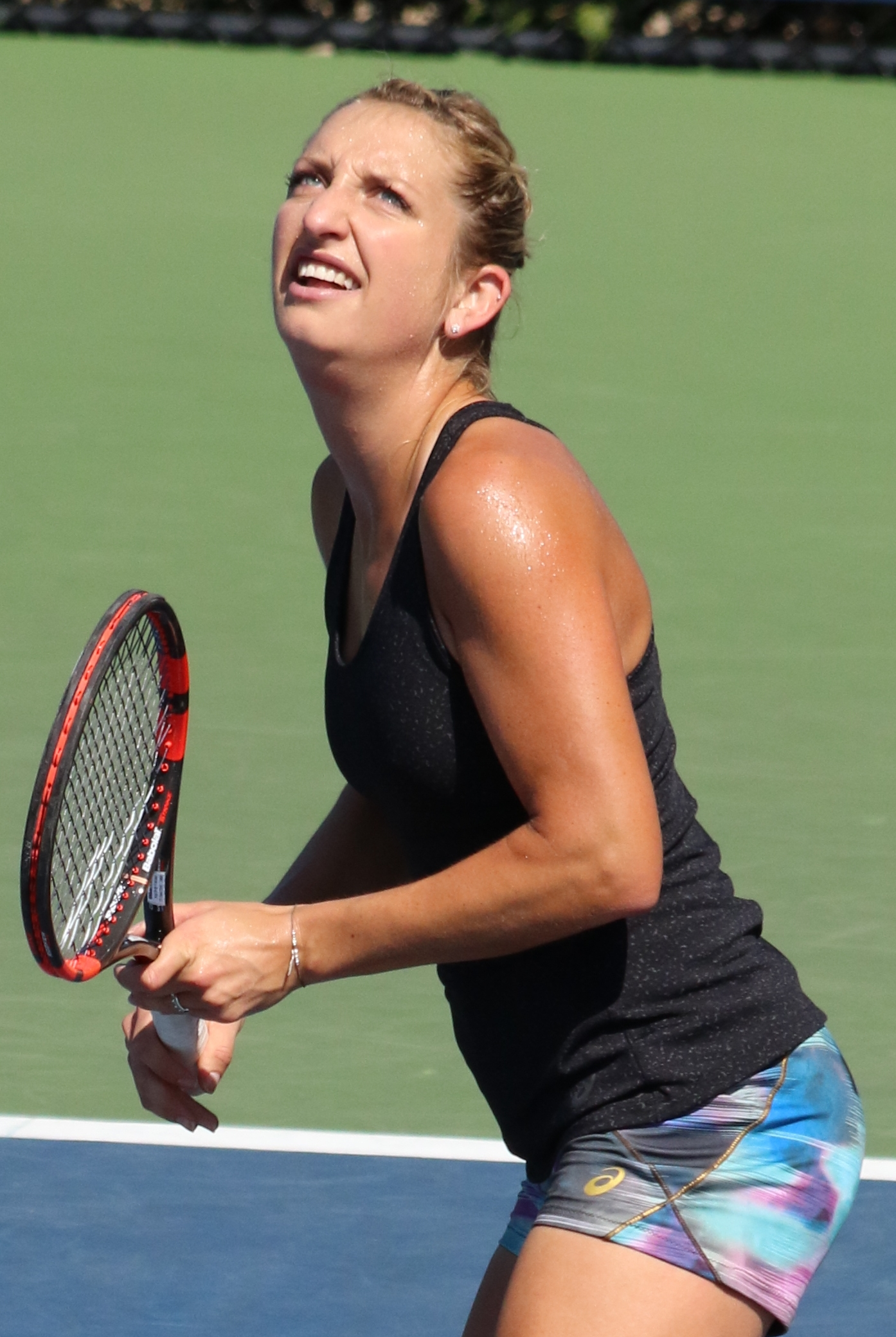
Bacsinszky at the 2016 US Open

Bacsinszky's first two tournaments both ended in defeats as she lost to Anastasia Pavlyuchenkova and Anna Karolína Schmiedlová at the Brisbane International and at the Sydney International, respectively. Her next tournament was the Australian Open, where she beat Kateřina Siniaková but lost to Annika Beck. At the Fed Cup, Bacsinszky lost both of her matches in Switzerland's tie against Germany, but these losses did not do any harm to Switzerland who beat Germany in the doubles. She then withdrew from the Dubai Championships. At the Qatar Ladies Open, Bacsinszky defeated Bethanie Mattek-Sands and Yulia Putintseva before losing to eventual champion Carla Suárez Navarro. However, Bacsinszky was not able to defend her back-to-back title in Acapulco and Monterrey from 2015 as they were set in the same dates as the aforementioned tournaments.

In March, she reached the fourth round at Indian Wells beating Tsvetana Pironkova and Eugenie Bouchard, respectively, but lost to Daria Kasatkina subsequently. She then made a surprising semifinal run at Miami Open, beating Agnieszka Radwańska and Simona Halep, two top-5 players, back-to-back. She lost to Svetlana Kuznetsova in straight sets in the semifinal.

At the clay-court season, Bacsinszky won her fourth WTA Tour title in Rabat, losing only one set in the tournament, and re-entered the top 10. She made the quarterfinals at Rome (losing to Garbiñe Muguruza) and reached her highest career ranking at No. 9. At the French Open, she beat Sílvia Soler Espinosa, Eugenie Bouchard, Pauline Parmentier and Venus Williams en route to her second straight quarterfinal, but lost to the unseeded Kiki Bertens.

Coming to the grass-court season, Bacsinszky played Eastbourne but was defeated by the in-form Kristina Mladenovic in straight sets. At Wimbledon, she started her campaign by beating qualifier Luksika Kumkhum in the first round and set up a rematch of last year's fourth round match against Monica Niculescu. Similar to last year, Bacsinszky turned the match around with a comeback win by winning six games in a row in the last set. However, she lost in straight sets to the eventual quarterfinalist Anastasia Pavlyuchenkova. She then reached the semifinals of the inaugural Ladies Championship Gstaad, losing to Kiki Bertens.

At the Summer Olympics, Bacsinszky suffered a first-round loss to China's Zhang Shuai; however, partnering with Martina Hingis for the first time in doubles, Bacsinszky earned her first Olympic medal, as they beat Daria Gavrilova/Samantha Stosur of Australia, Bethanie Mattek-Sands/CoCo Vandeweghe of the United States, Chan Hao-ching/Chan Yung-jan of Chinese Taipei and Andrea Hlaváčková/Lucie Hradecká of the Czech Republic en route to the final, where the pair lost to Ekaterina Makarova/Elena Vesnina of Russia. They become the first two Swiss female tennis Olympic medalists.

Due to her strong first half of the season, Bacsinszky qualified for Elite Trophy in Zhuhai. At the last event of the season, she lost to Zhang Shuai in straight sets in one of the two round-robin matches, but concluded the season with a win against Tímea Babos. She ended the season ranked No. 15.

=== 2017: second major semifinal ===
Bacsinszky withdrew from the Shenzhen Open and the Sydney International due to injury. With no warm-up match before the Australian Open, she matched her best result at this tournament with a third-round appearance, losing to Daria Gavrilova in three sets. Entering the Fed Cup as the Swiss No. 1, Bacsinszky won both of her rubbers against French player Alizé Cornet and Kristina Mladenovic. With injuries carried on from the Fed Cup, she had to retire in the first round of Doha and eventually withdrew from Dubai, the first Premier-5 event of the year. The Swiss, however, reached the second week of Indian Wells for the third consecutive year, only to retire against Karolína Plíšková due to wrist injury. She also had to withdraw from the Miami Open, where she was a semifinalist from the previous year. In the Fed Cup semifinal against Belarus, Bacsinszky beat Aryna Sabalenka but lost to Aliaksandra Sasnovich, and Switzerland eventually lost to Belarus 2–3 in that round.

Coming into the clay-court season with few tournaments played from the first quarter of the season, Bacsinszky struggled to go deep in different events including a loss to CiCi Bellis at Rabat as the defending champion; a second round loss at Madrid to Kiki Bertens, and a loss to Karolína Plíšková in the third round of Rome. The Swiss however did upset the reigning French Open champion Garbiñe Muguruza in first round of Madrid, her first top-10 win of the season and first win against the Spaniard.

At Roland Garros, Bacsinszky defeated Sara Sorribes Tormo, Ons Jabeur, Madison Brengle, Venus Williams, and Kristina Mladenovic to qualify for the semifinals. She lost in the semifinals against eventual champion Jeļena Ostapenko.

Bacsinszky underwent a surgical procedure in October, thus ending her season prematurely.

=== 2018: return ===
Bacsinszky returned to the tour in January at the St. Petersburg Ladies' Trophy, losing in the first round to qualifier Elena Rybakina. In doubles, she and Vera Zvonareva won the title beating Alla Kudryavtseva/Katarina Srebotnik in the final. In March, she played at the Indian Wells Open. She was defeated in the first round by Wang Qiang. At the Miami Open, she lost in the first round to Ekaterina Makarova.

=== 2019 ===
Bacsinszky kicked off her 2019 season at the Shenzhen Open, losing in the first round to fifth seed Maria Sharapova. In Sydney, she reached the quarterfinals before she was defeated by qualifier Aliaksandra Sasnovich. At the Australian Open, she upset 10th seed Daria Kasatkina in the first round. She lost in the third round to 18th seed Garbiñe Muguruza.

At the St. Petersburg Trophy, Bacsinszky was defeated in the first round by eighth seed and eventual finalist, Donna Vekić. Competing at the Indian Wells Challenger, she lost in the third round to Francesca Di Lorenzo. At the Indian Wells Open, she was defeated in the final round of qualifying by Caty McNally.

Beginning her clay-court season at the Ladies Open Lugano, Bacsinszky lost in the second round to Svetlana Kuznetsova. During the Fed Cup tie versus the US, Bacsinszky was defeated in both of her rubbers by Sloane Stephens and Sofia Kenin. The US team ended up winning the tie over Switzerland 3–2. At the Morocco Open, she lost in the second round to fourth seed Ajla Tomljanović. Seeded fourth at the Open de Cagnes-sur-Mer, she reached the semifinals where she was defeated by eventual champion Christina McHale. At the French Open, she fell in the second round of qualifying to Kurumi Nara. Seeded seventh at the Bol Open, she made it to the quarterfinals where she lost to top seed, defending and eventual champion, Tamara Zidanšek.

Playing just one grass-court tournament before Wimbledon, she was defeated in the first round of qualifying at Eastbourne by compatriot Viktorija Golubic. At Wimbledon, she lost in the first round to ninth seed Sloane Stephens.

As the top seed at the Contrexéville Open, Bacsinszky fell in the first round to Kurumi Nara. Playing in her country at the Ladies Open Lausanne, she lost in the first round to compatriot Jil Teichmann.

Competing in New York at the US Open, Bacsinszky was defeated in the first round by Caty McNally.

At the Korea Open, she suffered a double-bagel loss in the first round to American wildcard player Kristie Ahn.

Due to not playing any more tournaments for the rest of the season, Bacsinszky ended the year ranked 125.

=== 2021: retirement ===
Bacsinszky did not play any matches throughout the entirety of 2020, and also did not compete in 2021; as such, by July 2021, her ranking had dropped as far as No. 517 in the world. On 16 July 2021, Bacsinszky announced that she had decided to "turn the page", and that she has retired from the sport with immediate effect.

== Sponsors ==
Bacsinszky used Babolat racquets throughout her career, endorsing the Pure Storm and, later, the Pure Strike range of racquets. From 2009 until 2015, she was endorsed by Lacoste, and she wore ASICS clothing from 2016 to 2018. From 2019 until her retirement, she wore Le Coq Sportif apparel. Throughout her career, Bacsinszky wore and endorsed Nike footwear. She was also an ambassador for Japanese car manufacturer Honda.

== Career statistics ==
=== Grand Slam tournament performance timeline ===
Key
| W | F | SF | QF | #R | RR | Q# | DNQ | A | NH |

(W) winner; (F) finalist; (SF) semifinalist; (QF) quarterfinalist; (#R) rounds 4, 3, 2, 1; (RR) round-robin stage; (Q#) qualification round; (DNQ) did not qualify; (A) absent; (NH) not held; (SR) strike rate (events won / competed); (W–L) win–loss record.
To avoid confusion and double counting, these charts are updated at the conclusion of a tournament or when the player's participation has ended.

| Tournament | 2005 | 2006 | 2007 | 2008 | 2009 | 2010 | 2011 | 2012 | 2013 | 2014 | 2015 | 2016 | 2017 | 2018 | 2019 | 2020 | SR | W–L |
|---|---|---|---|---|---|---|---|---|---|---|---|---|---|---|---|---|---|---|
| Australian Open | Q1 | A | Q3 | 2R | A | 1R | 1R | A | A | A | 3R | 2R | 3R | A | 3R | A | 0 / 7 | 8–7 |
| French Open | A | A | 2R | 2R | 2R | 2R | A | A | Q1 | 2R | SF | QF | SF | A | Q2 | A | 0 / 8 | 19–8 |
| Wimbledon | A | A | 1R | 2R | 2R | 1R | A | A | Q2 | 2R | QF | 3R | 3R | A | 1R | NH | 0 / 9 | 11–9 |
| US Open | A | A | 1R | 3R | 2R | 1R | A | 1R | A | 2R | 1R | 2R | A | 1R | 1R | A | 0 / 10 | 5–10 |
| Win–loss | 0–0 | 0–0 | 1–3 | 5–4 | 3–3 | 1–4 | 0–1 | 0–1 | 0–0 | 3–3 | 11–4 | 8–4 | 9–3 | 0–1 | 2–3 | 0–0 | 0 / 34 | 43–34 |

Awards
| Preceded by (Canada) Eugenie Bouchard | WTA Most Improved Player; 2015 | Succeeded by (United Kingdom) Johanna Konta |
