= Tímea Babos =

Hungarian tennis player

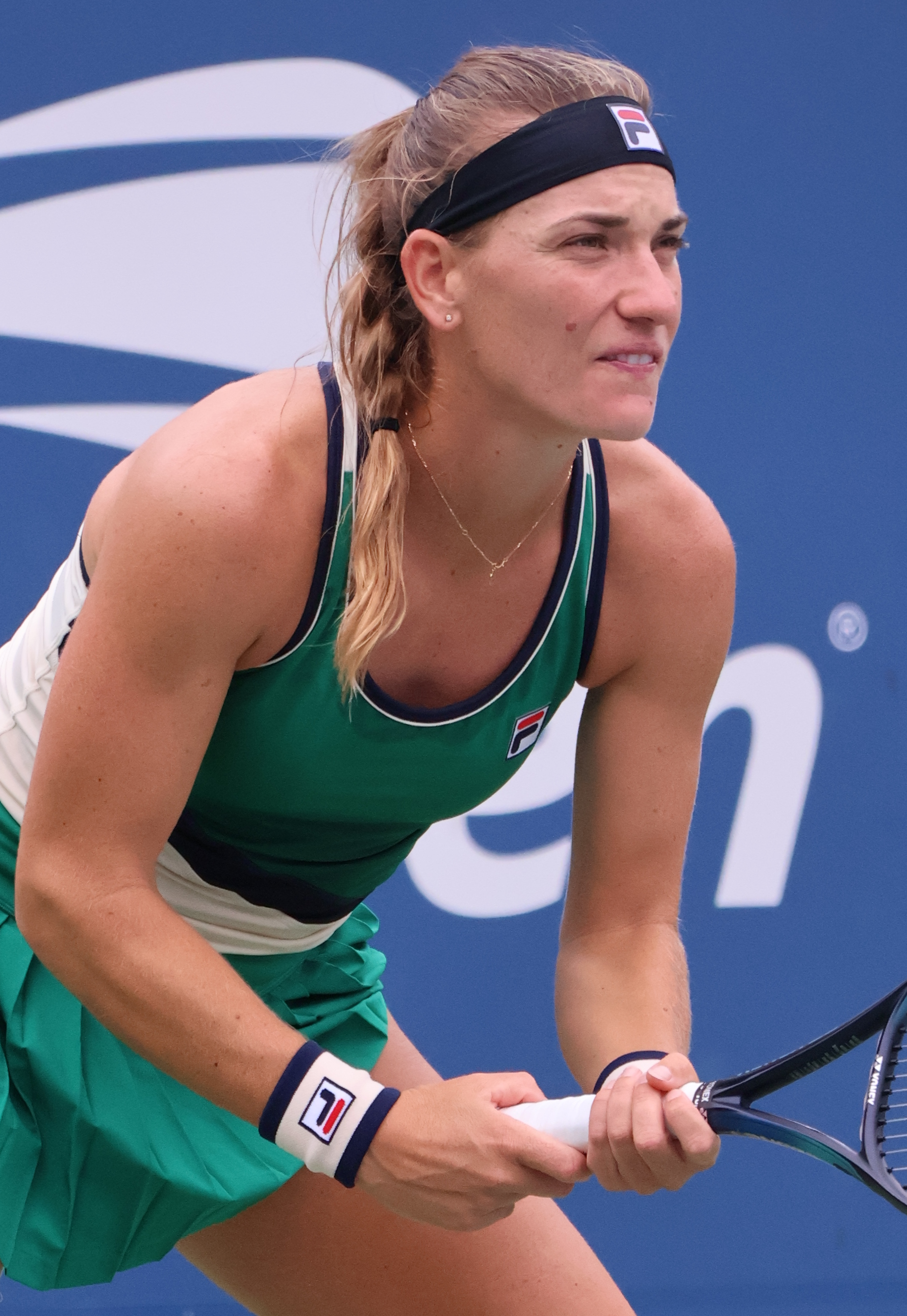
- Babos at the 2023 US Open
- Country (sports): Hungary
- Residence: Sopron, Hungary
- Born: 10 May 1993 (age 33) Sopron, Hungary
- Height: 1.79 m (5 ft 10 in)
- Turned pro: 2011
- Plays: Right (two-handed backhand)
- Coach: Romain Deridder
- Prize money: US$ 9,596,841
- Official website: babostimea.hu

Singles
- Career record: 425–335
- Career titles: 3
- Highest ranking: No. 25 (19 September 2016)

Grand Slam singles results
- Australian Open: 2R (2016, 2018, 2019, 2021)
- French Open: 2R (2016)
- Wimbledon: 2R (2012, 2015, 2016)
- US Open: 3R (2016)

Doubles
- Career record: 491–241
- Career titles: 29
- Highest ranking: No. 1 (16 July 2018)
- Current ranking: No. 17 (22 June 2026)

Grand Slam doubles results
- Australian Open: W (2018, 2020)
- French Open: W (2019, 2020)
- Wimbledon: F (2014, 2016)
- US Open: F (2018)

Other doubles tournaments
- Tour Finals: W (2017, 2018, 2019)

Grand Slam mixed doubles results
- Australian Open: F (2018)
- French Open: SF (2014)
- Wimbledon: F (2015)
- US Open: QF (2017)

Team competitions
- Fed Cup: 20–9
Medal record
Representing a mixed-NOCs team
Youth Olympic Games
| Bronze medal – third place | 2010 Singapore | Girls' doubles |
- Last updated on: 24 June 2026.

Tímea Babos (Hungarian pronunciation: [ˈtiːmɛɒ ˈbɒboʃ]; born 10 May 1993) is a Hungarian inactive tennis player who specializes in doubles. She is a former world No. 1 in this category by the WTA. She has won 29 career doubles titles and three in singles. Babos is a four-time major champion in women's doubles, having won the 2018 and 2020 Australian Opens, as well as the French Open in 2019 and 2020, all alongside Kristina Mladenovic.

Babos and Mladenovic were also finalists at the 2014 Wimbledon Championships, 2018 US Open and the 2019 Australian Open, and Babos reached the final of the 2016 Wimbledon Championships with Yaroslava Shvedova. In mixed-doubles, she has reached two major finals, at the 2015 Wimbledon Championships with Alexander Peya, and at the 2018 Australian Open partnering Rohan Bopanna. Babos became world No. 1 for the first time in July 2018, holding the top ranking for 13 weeks, and was the first Hungarian player, male or female, to reach number one in either singles or doubles. She also has won another big titles on the WTA Tour, they being the 2017, 2018 and 2019 WTA Finals and two WTA 1000 trophies.

In singles, Babos has a career-high ranking of No. 25, achieved in September 2016, and has won three titles on the WTA Tour, also finishing runner-up on five occasions. She has represented Hungary in Fed Cup and Billie Jean King Cup since 2011, and also competed at the 2012 and 2016 Olympic Games. She also qualified for the 2020 Olympic Games in women's doubles, however she had to cancel her participation due to her hip injury.

Babos is considered the most successful Hungarian tennis player with seven major doubles titles, four in women's and three in girls' doubles, with three WTA Finals titles and holding the world No. 1 position in doubles as the first ever Hungarian tennis player.

== Early and personal life ==
Tímea Babos was born on 10 May 1993 to mother Zsuzsanna and father Csaba in Sopron, Hungary. She has an older sister. Coming from a sporty family, Babos decided to follow her family tradition. Her father is a coach at the tennis club her family owns in Sopron, while her mother is a housewife. Her sister was also a very good player and won NCAA titles when studying at Berkeley in the United States. She was originally a swimmer and was national champion in Hungary, but during that time she looked differently at swimming, finding it quite boring and as hard work, so she started to come with her sister to tennis practice at the age of 8. Originally, she started playing tennis just for fun, but then her dad saw her talent, so she started to concentrate more on it and eventually stopped swimming.

She loved watching her sister's workouts with their father, when she was eight and her sister 16, so her parents signed her up for a class at a local club and after a few months, she was accepted into local events. Her breakthrough came at the age of nine, where after leading the u12 club team to four qualification round victories, she qualified for the u12 National Championships. A few weeks later, she won her first Hungarian National Championship title. At 15, she travelled to the United Kingdom to practice owing to her homeland's lack of sufficient facilities. One of the opportunities was practice on hardcourts; her country mostly has clay courts. Two years after her arrival in England, she got a good sponsorship deal, which meant she could return and train in Budapest.

Babos resides in her birthtown Sopron in Hungary. Her nickname on tour is 'Babosdook', given to her by doubles partner Kristina Mladenovic as she is a big fan of horror films. The nickname is a reference to the film The Babadook. Tímea Babos has become the first Hungarian female tennis player to reach the world number one spot. She enjoyed watching Elena Dementieva growing up. Her comment stated:

I really liked her style of play and, although she never won a Grand Slam, she was always at or near the top and also won the Olympics. She didn't seem arrogant and was always nice to the junior players at Grand Slams. Despite being so successful she seemed to be a nice person. — Babos, on Dementieva

In an interview with Mancunian Matters, she noted that she is supporter of Manchester United, as well as her whole family.

== Juniors ==
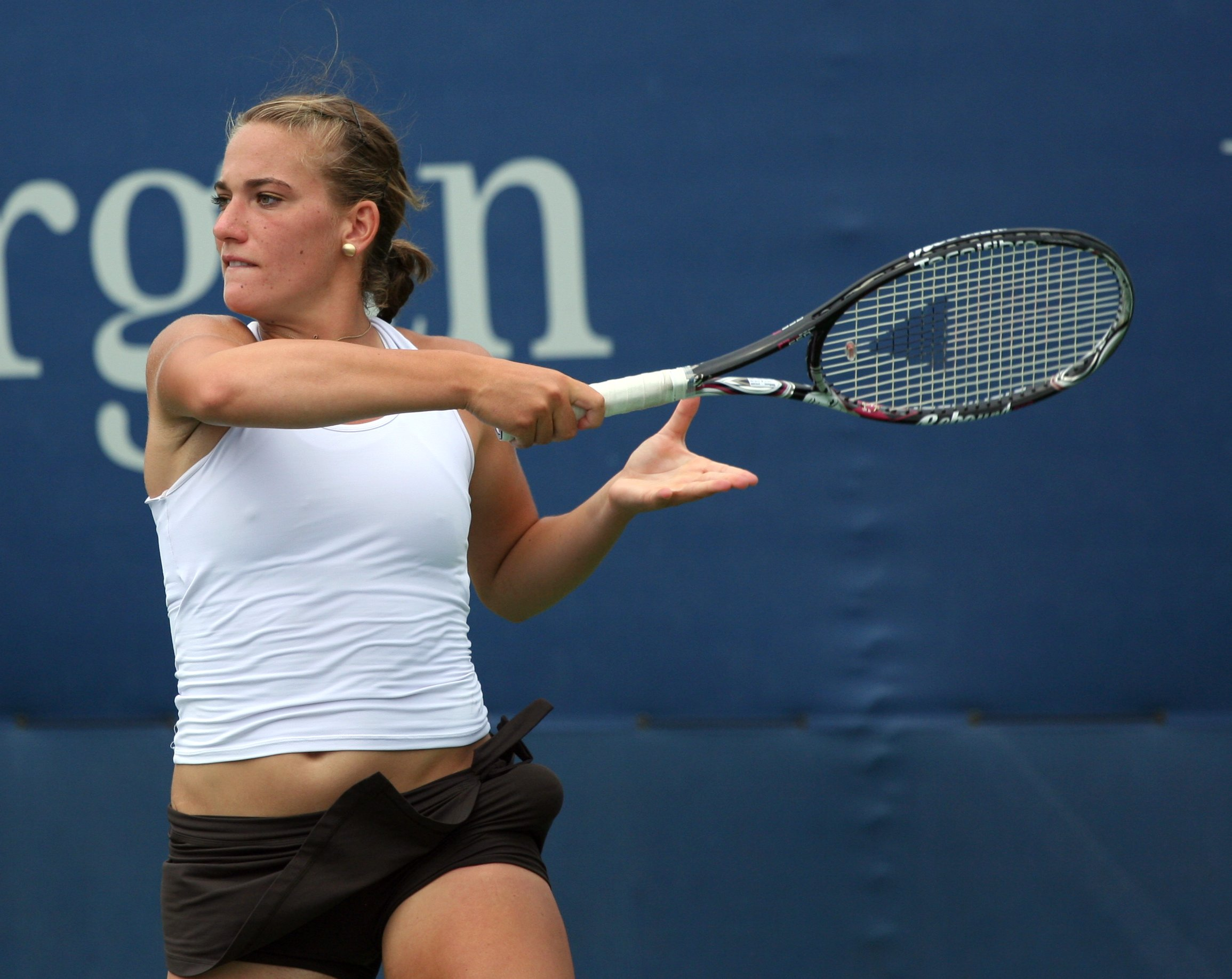
Tímea Babos in action during the 2009 US Open junior event

Babos reached a career-high ranking of No. 2 as a junior. She began competing on the ITF Junior Circuit in September 2006 at the age of 13, winning the title in her debut event in doubles at the lowest-level Grade-5 Talentum Cup in homeland Hungary. There, she also made her singles debut but lost in the second round. By the end of the year, she didn't play at any tournament. But she then continued her success in doubles, winning the following tournament, the Grade-5 Mostar Open in April 2007. In the second half of the year, she won Grade-3 Budaörs Cup and then Grade-2 TrueVisions Thailand Open, both in doubles.

The following year, she made a progress, reaching the semifinal in singles and final in doubles event at the Grade-1 Barranquilla Junior Tennis Tournament Country Club. In March, she made a step further, reaching her first Grade-1 singles final and doubles title at the Mitsubishi-Lancer International Juniors Championships. Babos then made her major debut at the junior 2008 French Open, reaching the second round in both singles and doubles. At Wimbledon, she lost in the first round, but made it to the quarterfinals in doubles. In August, she played at the Canadian Open Junior Championships, reaching quarterfinals in singles and final in doubles. On her debut at the US Open, she reached only the first round in singles and second round in doubles. At her last tournament of the 2008 season, she reached singles quarterfinals and title in doubles at the Grade-A Osaka Mayor's Cup.

Babos had strong results at the junior major and other Grade-A and Grade-1 events in 2009. She started year with successful performances at the Grade-1 tournaments winning both singles and doubles title at the Copa Gatorade in January and at the Sarawak Chief Minister's Cup in March. At the same grade, she won the Japan Open Junior Championships in singles, while in doubles she finished runner–up. At the 2009 French Open, she managed to get to her first Grand Slam tournament final in doubles event. Partnering with Heather Watson, they lost to Elena Bogdan and Noppawan Lertcheewakarn in a tough final, in three sets. At Wimbledon, she reached her first major singles semifinal but failed in the second round in doubles. Later, Babos left her mark at the Grade A Osaka Mayor's Cup, winning doubles event and finishing runner–up in singles. She finished 2009 season with singles second round and quarterfinal in doubles at the Orange Bowl.

Babos had a strong start into next season, winning her first singles tournament of the year, the Grade-1 Loy Yang Traralgon International. She followed this with singles quarterfinal and final in doubles at the Australian Open. The first major for Babos came at the French Open in the doubles alongside Sloane Stephens, defeating Lara Arruabarrena and María Teresa Torró Flor in the final, and not dropping a single set in the entire tournament. Babos won another major title with Stephens defeating Irina Khromacheva and Elina Svitolina in the final of Wimbledon. Babos also won the title at the US Open, again with Stephens, by walkover in the final. This was her last junior tournament.

== Professional ==
=== 2009–11: Success in early ITF events ===
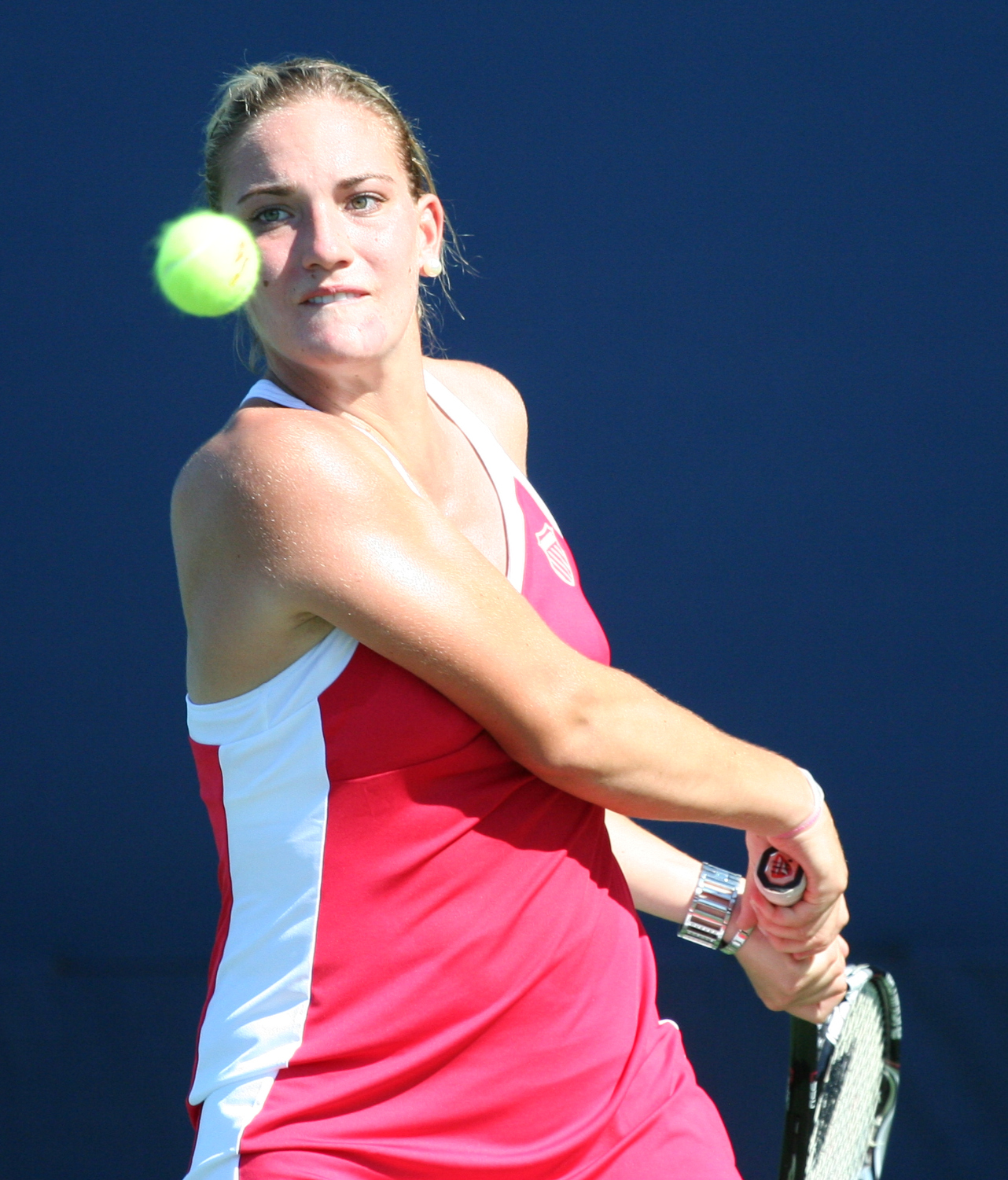
Tímea Babos in 2010

Still playing tournaments of the ITF Junior Circuit, Babos began competing on the ITF Women's Circuit in 2009 at the age of 15, reaching the final in her debut event in Bournemouth. The following week, she played on another 10k event in the United Kingdom, and won her first title. Babos continued winning one and losing two 10k finals, by the end of the 2009 season. She had a strong start in doubles too, winning one of two finals that she reached on the ITF Circuit.

She started 2010 with mixed results, but her first improvement was at a 25k event in Budapest where she reached her first final in that category, but finished as runner–up. In early July, she made her WTA Tour debut at the Hungarian Open as a wildcard player, but lost to Timea Bacsinszky in the first round. The following week, she won her first 25k title in Woking. Despite the fact she still didn't make her WTA Tour debut in doubles, Babos won four 25k events, two of them in Australia and one in the United Kingdom and in New Zealand.

At the Hungarian Open in July 2011, Babos realized her first WTA match-win, defeating Anna-Giulia Remondina, but lost in the next round to Roberta Vinci. There, she also made her doubles debut, partnering with Katalin Marosi, but she lost her first WTA Tour doubles match. Her first major appearance was at the US Open; she failed to reach the main-draw, losing in the qualification. In late October, she won her first 50k event in both singles and doubles at the Challenger de Saguenay. She reached another $50k final in doubles, and also reached semifinals in singles.

=== 2012–13: First singles and doubles WTA Tour title ===
==== Singles ====
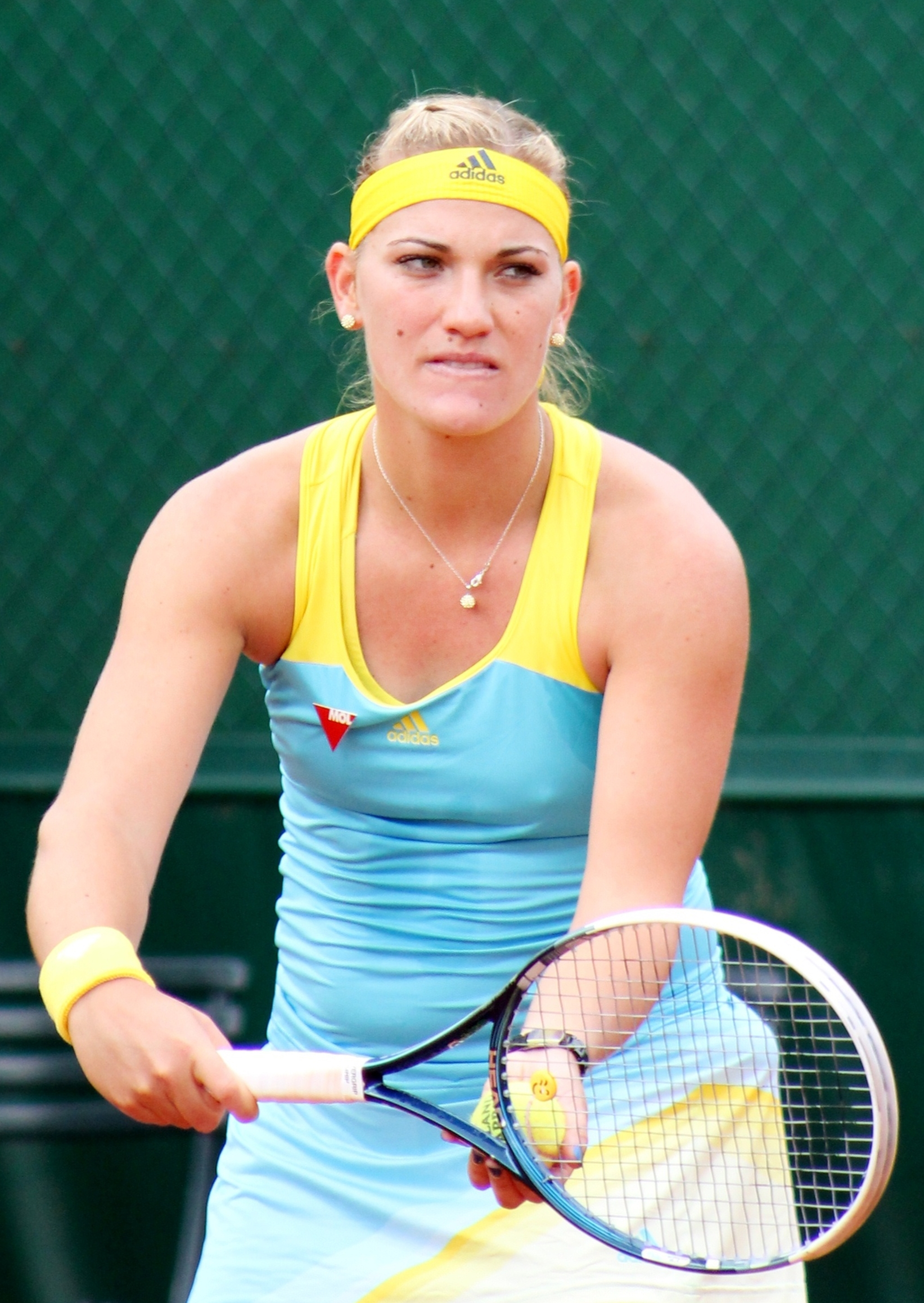
... at the 2013 French Open

Babos had strong start of the 2012 season. At the first tournament of the year, she finished runner–up at the Blossum Cup in Quanzhou, losing there to Kimiko Date. At the Australian Open, she failed to reach her first main draw. A month later, she reached her first WTA Tour singles semifinal at the Copa Colsanitas. She won against one qualifier, wildcard and seeded player, before she lost in the semifinal to Alexandra Panova. She reached her first WTA Tour singles final at the Monterrey Open, and won the title. These good results helped Babos rise from No. 107 to 68 in the following WTA rankings to make her top-100 debut.

Babos continued to improve, making her major debut at the French Open, where she lost to Sesil Karatantcheva in the first round. At Wimbledon, she recorded her first major match win, defeating wildcard player Melanie Oudin, but lost in the next round to the experienced Russian player Nadia Petrova. In early August, she made her Premier 5/Premier Mandatory debut at the Canadian Open, reaching the main draw through qualifying, and then the following week, she recorded her first Premier/Premier Mandatory win at the Cincinnati Open. In 2013, as her highlights in singles, she reached only three quarterfinals at the International-level Brasil Tennis Cup, the Monterrey Open and Hungarian Open. She finished runner–up at the 75k event Viccourt Cup in Donetsk, and won the 50k Soweto Open in Johannesburg.

==== Doubles ====
In the first half of 2012, Babos reached three International-level semifinals. First at the Copa Colsanitas alongside Valeria Savinykh, followed by the semifinal of the Morocco Open alongside Mandy Minella, and finally that of the Internationaux de Strasbourg alongside Hsieh Su-wei. She then won her first WTA Tour doubles title at the Birmingham Classic with Hsieh, defeating Liezel Huber and Lisa Raymond in three sets. This year, Babos also made her Grand Slam debut at the French Open, at the same time she debuted in singles as well. She partnered with Hsieh, and they were eliminated by Sara Errani and Roberta Vinci in the second round. In 2013, Babos made more progress in doubles than in singles. Unlike failing to win the title in singles, she won four International titles in doubles. First she won Copa Colsanitas in February, partnering with Mandy Minella. She then won the Monterrey Open in April alongside Kimiko Date. Later in April, she won the Morocco Open, again with Minella, and finally, in early September, the Tashkent Open, partnering with Yaroslava Shvedova.

=== 2014–15: Major final, debut at the WTA Finals, top 10 ===
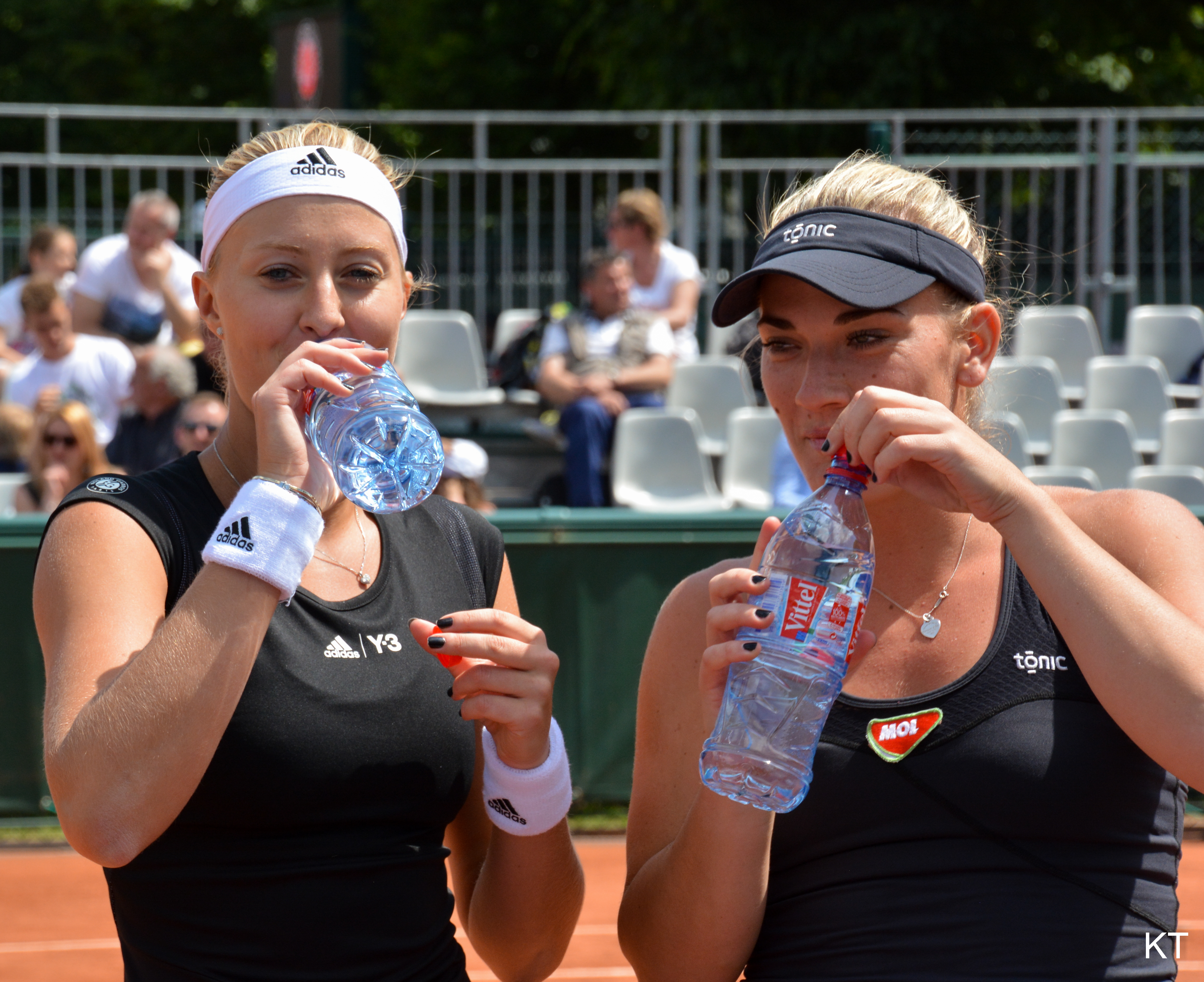
Babos with her doubles partner Mladenovic

Babos continued with modest results in singles on the WTA Tour, falling mostly in the first round. Success she had on the ITF Circuit, where she won the 75k Kangaroo Cup in Gifu, and then the 100k Internationaux de la Vienne in Poitiers. In doubles, she had a strong start, winning at the Premier-level Sydney International, her second doubles title of the year. She reached another Premier final at the Open GdF Suez, but ended runner-up alongside Kristina Mladenovic. After a few non-significant results, she reached the final at the Monterrey Open but lost in the final. Two weeks later, she won the Malaysian Open alongside Chan Hao-ching. In late June, Babos made big improvement, reaching her first Grand Slam final at Wimbledon alongside Mladenovic. They lost to Italian former champions, Sara Errani and Roberta Vinci. With this result, Babos advanced to the top 30. Again with Mladenovic, she reached the final at the Cincinnati Open, but they lost after the retirement.

In the first half of the 2015 season, Babos continued to struggle with her singles results. She then reached the final at the Morocco Open, losing to Elina Svitolina. By the end of the year, she reached only one quarterfinal at the Tianjin Open, losing to Karolína Plíšková. In doubles, she realized her first title of the year at the Premier 5 Dubai Championships, with Mladenovic. In late March, she reached the semifinals at the Miami Open. Clay-court season was successful for Babos, winning title at the Morocco Open, and later another Premier 5 title at the Italian Open. Grass-court season started with the semifinal at the Rosmalen Championships and the quarterfinal of the Birmingham Classic. At Wimbledon, she failed to repeat last year result, this time finishing alongside Mladenovic one round earlier, losing in the semifinals. She also reached the mixed-doubles final alongside Alexander Peya, but they lost to Martina Hingis/Leander Paes. After that, she reached quarterfinals at the Cincinnati Open and China Open. At the end of the year, Babos debuted at the WTA Finals, where she alongside Mladenovic failed to pass the round-robin group.

=== 2016: Top 30 in singles, Wimbledon final in doubles ===
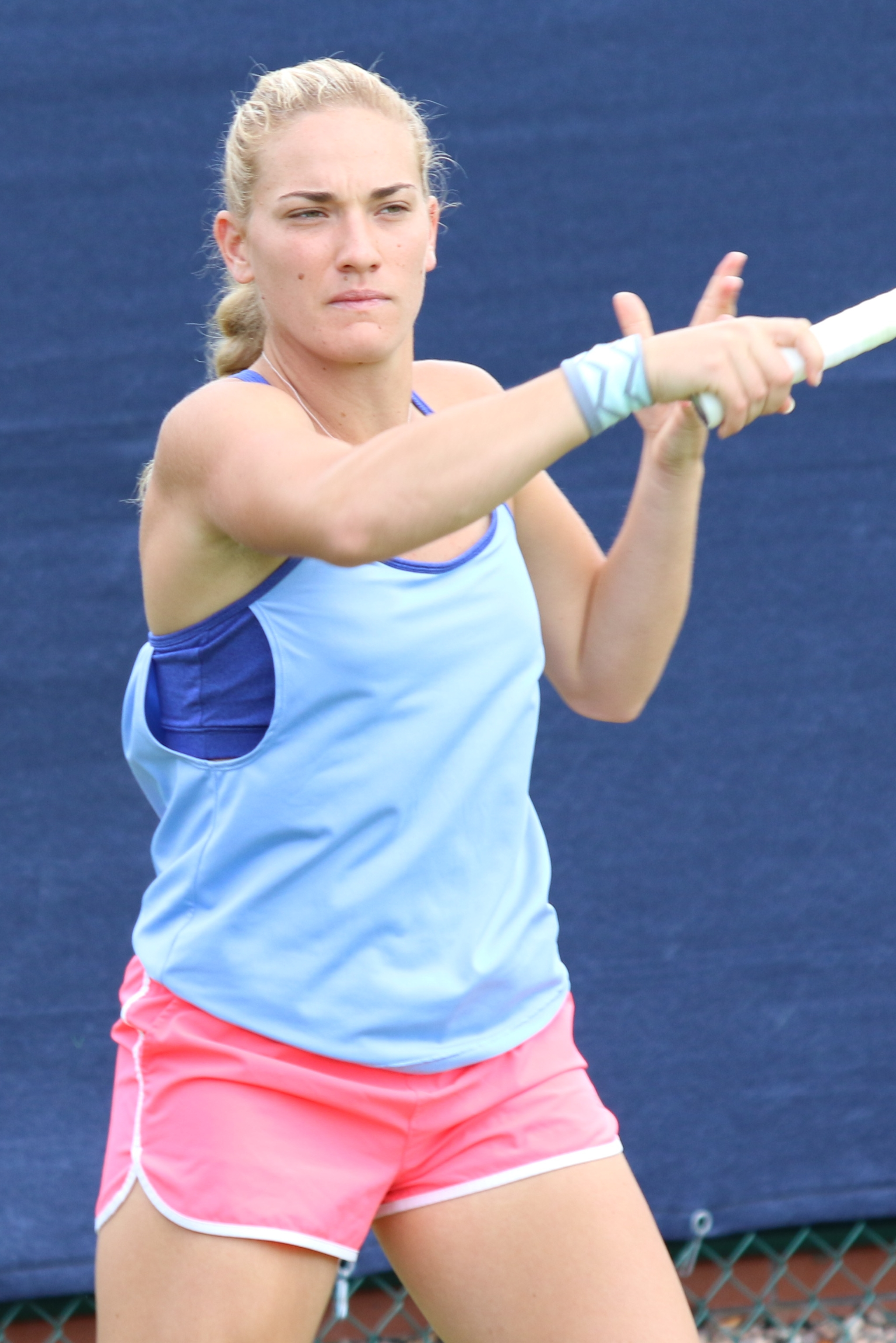
Babos at the 2016 Birmingham Classic

==== Singles ====
After years of weak singles performances, Babos, at the opening week, reached semifinal which she lost to Alison Riske. Followed by second round of the Australian Open, quarterfinal of the St. Petersburg Trophy and third round of the Premier 5 Qatar Open. At the Miami Open, she reached the round of 16 for the first time at some Premier 5/Mandatory tournament, missing her chance to reach the quarterfinal, losing to Angelique Kerber. She continued, reaching the quarterfinal at the Katowice Open and semifinal at the Morocco Open. At the Italian Open, she beat Venus Williams in the second round, before losing to Madison Keys. In early August, she advanced to the Brasil Cup final, but lost to Irina-Camelia Begu. She then reached her first Premier 5 quarterfinal at the Cincinnati Open, losing there to fourth seed Garbiñe Muguruza. At the US Open, she reached third round for the first time at major event in singles, but then was defeated by seed Simona Halep. So she made her top 30 debut, and in the following week, she climbed to her career-high singles ranking of 25. In her last two singles tournaments, Babos reached the quarterfinal at the Kremlin Cup and then qualified for the first time for the year-end WTA Elite Trophy. However, she lost in her round-robin group to Bacsinszky and Zhang Shuai.

==== Doubles ====
The season also was successful in doubles. In the United States, Babos reached the semifinals at the Premier Mandatory Indian Wells Open, followed with the final at the same-category Miami Open, where she ended runner-up. In July, she reached another major final at Wimbledon. This time partnering with Shvedova, she lost to Serena and Venus Williams. At Premier 5 tournaments, she also did quite well, reaching quarterfinals at four out of five tournaments. For the second time in a row, she qualified for the WTA Finals. Format of competition had changed, having eliminated round-robin group at first. Babos alongside Shvedova lost in the first round to Lucie Šafářová and Bethanie Mattek-Sands. It was her first season without a doubles title since 2012.

=== 2017: WTA Finals title ===
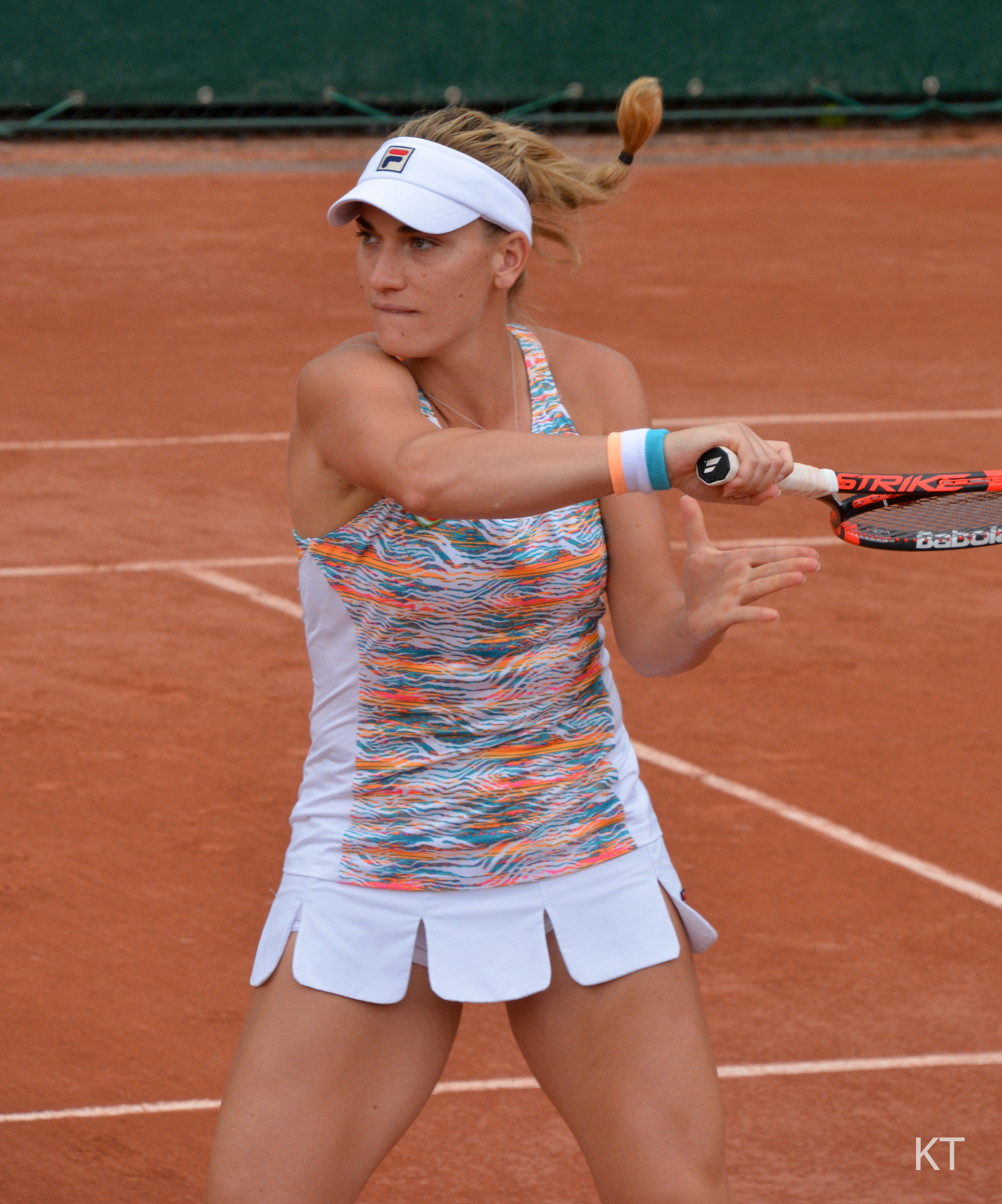
Babos at the 2017 French Open

This was first season when Babos reached more than one singles final. In her homeland, she played at the Hungarian Open, where she defeated Lucie Šafářová in the final and marked her second career singles title. In September, she reached another two international-level finals at the Tournoi de Québec and Tashkent Open, but failed to win the title at both of them. During the year, she reached only one quarterfinal at the Monterrey Open, where she lost to seed No. 2, Anastasia Pavlyuchenkova. Despite the fact she reached three singles finals, she dropped in her ranking, starting year inside top 30, but then finished outside the top 50.

In doubles, she reached two new Premier Mandatory finals, at the Madrid Open and China Open, but these were her others unsuccessful attempts to win her first title in that category. At Wimbledon, she failed to reach her previous-year result, losing in the third round, but then she get into the quarterfinal at the US Open. Before the end of the year, she won three international-level tournament, as well Premier-level tournaments Sydney International and Kremlin Cup. Once again, she qualified for the WTA Finals. Together with Andrea Sestini Hlaváčková, she won the title, defeating Kiki Bertens and Johanna Larsson in the final.

=== 2018: Major title, world No. 1 in doubles ===
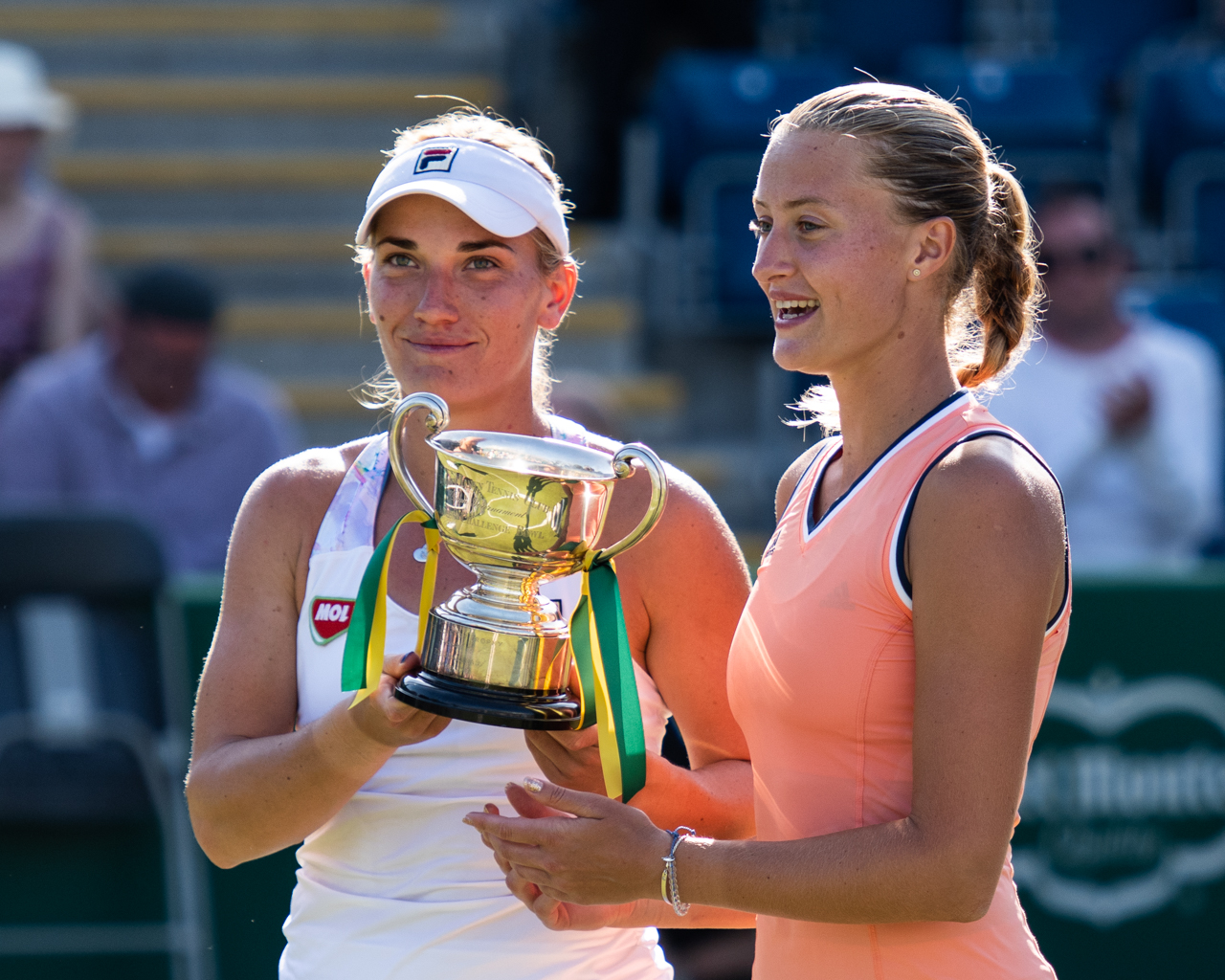
Babos and Mladenovic holding 2019 Birmingham Classic trophy

Babos continued with reaching finals in singles. In late January, after the Australian Open where she recorded top-ten win against CoCo Vandeweghe in the first round, Babos went to the Taipei to play at the Taiwan Open. There she won her third singles title, defeating Kateryna Kozlova in the final. Later, in April, she reached another hardcourt singles final at the Monterrey Open, but this time lost to top seed Garbiñe Muguruza. During the year, she also reached one quarterfinal at the Shenzhen Open in the first week of the year.

Despite the fact she left her mark in singles, more success came in doubles. Babos continued with good results, but this time she made even more remarkable results. At the Australian Open, she won her first Grand Slam title, partnering with Kristina Mladenovic. They defeated Russian duo Ekaterina Makarova/Elena Vesnina. She also reached the mixed doubles final alongside Rohan Bopanna; they lost to Gabriela Dabrowski and Mate Pavić. Things continued on the right track, reaching a Premier Mandatory semifinal at the Indian Wells Open and then final of the Madrid Open from the same category. She followed this win with quarterfinals of the Italian Open and French Open, before she won title at the Premier-level Birmignam Classic. After the quarterfinal loss in Wimbledon, Babos became world No. 1 doubles player on the July 16. She then continued with two other quarterfinals, at the Canadian Open and Cincinnati Open, before she reached another Grand Slam final at the US Open. Unlike at the Australian Open, this time Babos and Mladenovic, failed to win another Grand Slam title, losing to Ashleigh Barty and CoCo Vandeweghe. Later, another two quarterfinals at the Wuhan Open and China Open, before she participated at the WTA Finals. For the second time in a row, Babos won the WTA Finals title, this time with Mladenovic.

=== 2019–20: Three major doubles titles ===
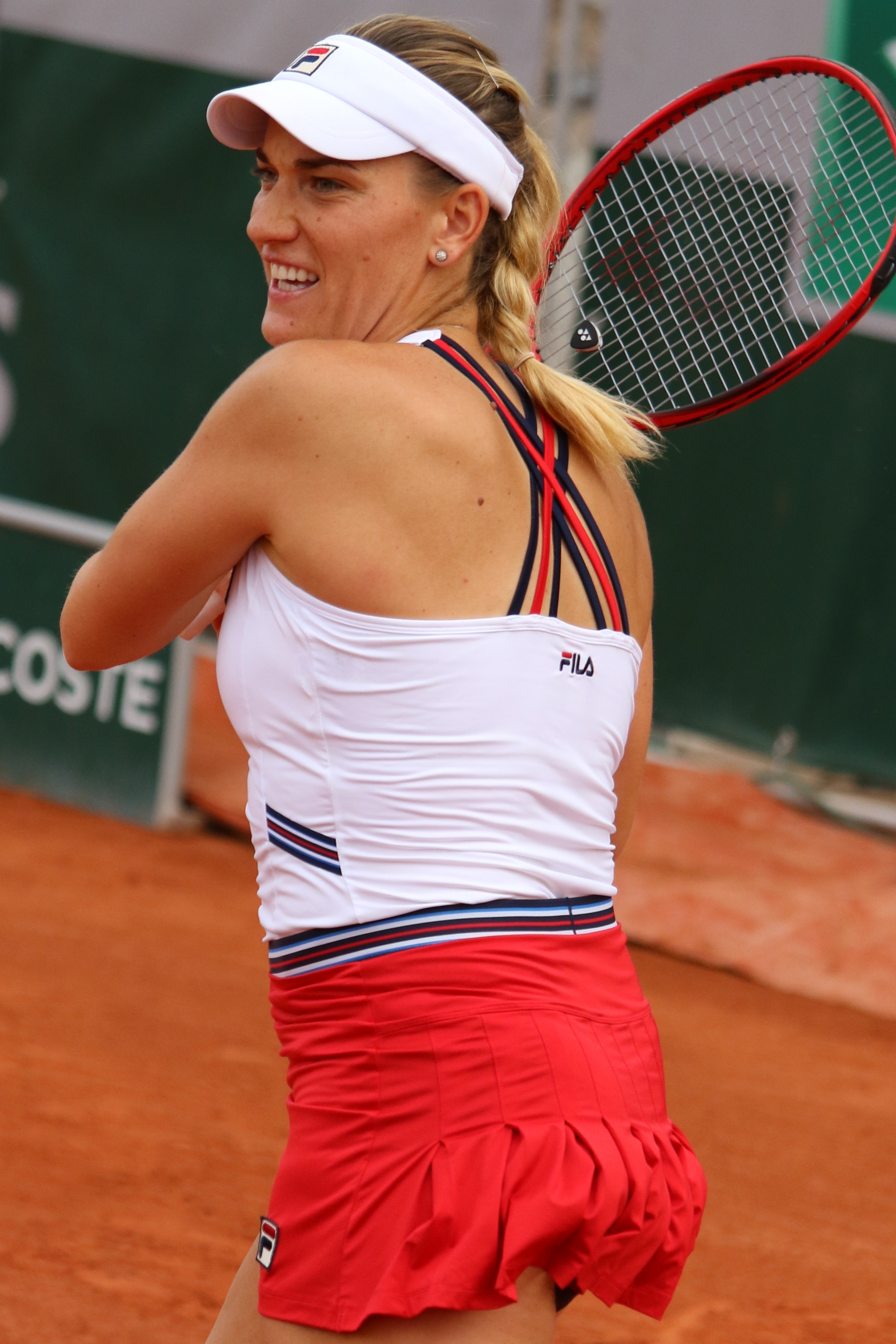
Babos at the 2019 French Open

While struggling to do well in singles during 2019 and 2020, Babos shone in doubles. At the start of the 2019 season, Babos alongside Mladenovic reached her first final at the Australian Open, but they lost to Samantha Stosur and Zhang Shuai in the straight-sets. In April 2019, she and Mladenovic won the Istanbul Cup, losing only one game in the final match against Alexa Guarachi and Sabrina Santamaria. Another Grand Slam final they reached at the French Open. This time, they beat Chinese players Duan Yingying and Zheng Saisai. Followed by a Wimbledon semifinal, again partnering with Mladenovic. At the US Open, she reached her first doubles quarterfinal there, thus completing quarterfinals at all four majors in the same year. Before she qualified for the WTA Finals, she got to the quarterfinal at the China Open and semifinal at the Kremlin Cup. For the first time since 2015, WTA Finals brought back round-robin group, and Babos and Mladenovic won all three matches, as well as the semifinal and final. It was the third title for Babos, and the second alongside Mladenovic.

Babos continued playing well in 2020. At her first tournament, the Australian Open, she won her third major title, all with Mladenovic. They beat Barbora Strýcová and Hsieh Su-wei in the final, and did not drop a single set during the whole tournament. In late February, she and Mladenovic missed the chance to reach another final, losing to Gabriela Dabrowski and Jeļena Ostapenko in three sets in the semifinal of the Qatar Ladies Open. Then, after six months of absence due to the COVID-19 pandemic, Babos competed at the US Open. Babos and Mladenovic continued the good performances, winning their first-round match, before being disqualified from the tournament due to Mladenovic's contact with French player Benoît Paire who had been tested positive for COVID-19. However, that did not stop them to defend their title at the French Open, defeating Alexa Guarachi and Desirae Krawczyk in the final.

=== 2021–22: WTA 1000 semifinal, back to top 100 in doubles ===
Babos started her 2021 season at the first edition of the Gippsland Trophy where she lost in the second round to 12th seed Caroline Garcia. She also lost in the second round at the Australian Open in singles.

Seeded fifth in doubles, she reached the semifinals at Dubai with Veronika Kudermetova.

She withdrew from the 2022 Australian Open as she was not willing to comply with the COVID-19 rules. As a result, in April 2022 she hit her lowest doubles ranking of No. 242. She finished the 2022 season ranked No. 92 in doubles.

=== 2023–24: Back to the tour in singles and majors in doubles ===
In singles, Babos qualified for the main draw of the Morocco Open in Rabat, and defeated Irina Khromacheva in the first round, her first singles win at a WTA 250 level in over two years. Ranked No. 181, she entered the singles main draw of the WTA 500 Zhengzhou Open as a lucky loser.

=== 2025–26: New partnership, WTA Finals finalist, hiatus ===
Partnering Brazilian Luisa Stefani for the first time, in January Babos won the doubles title at the WTA 500 Upper Austria Ladies Linz, defeating Lyudmyla and Nadiia Kichenok in the final

In May, she and Stefani won the WTA 500 Internationaux de Strasbourg, defeating in the final Guo Hanyu and Nicole Melichar-Martinez.

In September the Babos-Stefani pair won the first edition of SP Open, a WTA 250 tournament in São Paulo, Brazil, defeating Brazilians Ingrid Martins and Laura Pigossi in three sets at the doubles final, losing only one set through the campaign.

Then Stefani and Babos went to play at the Asian Swing tournaments. At the China Open, they reached the quarterfinals, before losing in two sets to Miyu Kato and Fanny Stollár.

At the Wuhan Open, they stopped at the round of 16 where they lost to Iva Jovic and Giuliana Olmos in three sets.

At the Ningbo International Open they were runner-ups and lost to Nicole Melichar-Martinez and Liudmila Samsonova at the final. By reaching the final, Babos and Stefani got the remaining points they needed to qualify for the WTA Finals at the seventh position. This was the fourth time Babos qualified for the WTA Finals.

Lastly, Babos and Stefani got to be the champions of the Pan Pacific Open in Tokyo, beating Anna Danilina and Aleksandra Krunić in straight sets at the final, securing their fourth title together in their fifth final.

In October, Stefani and Babos were selected to be in a poll on WTA's Instagram account for the "Shot of the month" with a no-look backhand shot from Stefani at the opening set of the doubles final in Ningbo. They won the poll by being the most voted by the public.

At the WTA Finals, Babos and Stefani were selected to be in the Liezel Huber group.

They finished the round robin as the second best team, after losing in three sets to Townsend and Siniaková at the first match, winning against Mirra Andreeva and Diana Shneider in three sets at the second match and finally winning against Gabriela Dabrowski and Erin Routliffe at the third match in three sets.

Those results made Stefani and Babos to go beyond the WTA Finals' round robin and reach the semifinals. In the semifinals, they beat Hsieh Su-wei and Jelena Ostapenko in two sets In the final they were defeated by Mertens and Kudermetova in two sets.

Later, Babos stated that she would not continue with the partnership with Stefani in 2026 and that she would only play at the tournaments in Australia and then make a pause on her career to be with friends and family. She also mentioned that she intends to participate at the 2028 Summer Olympic Games in Los Angeles.

== Playing style ==
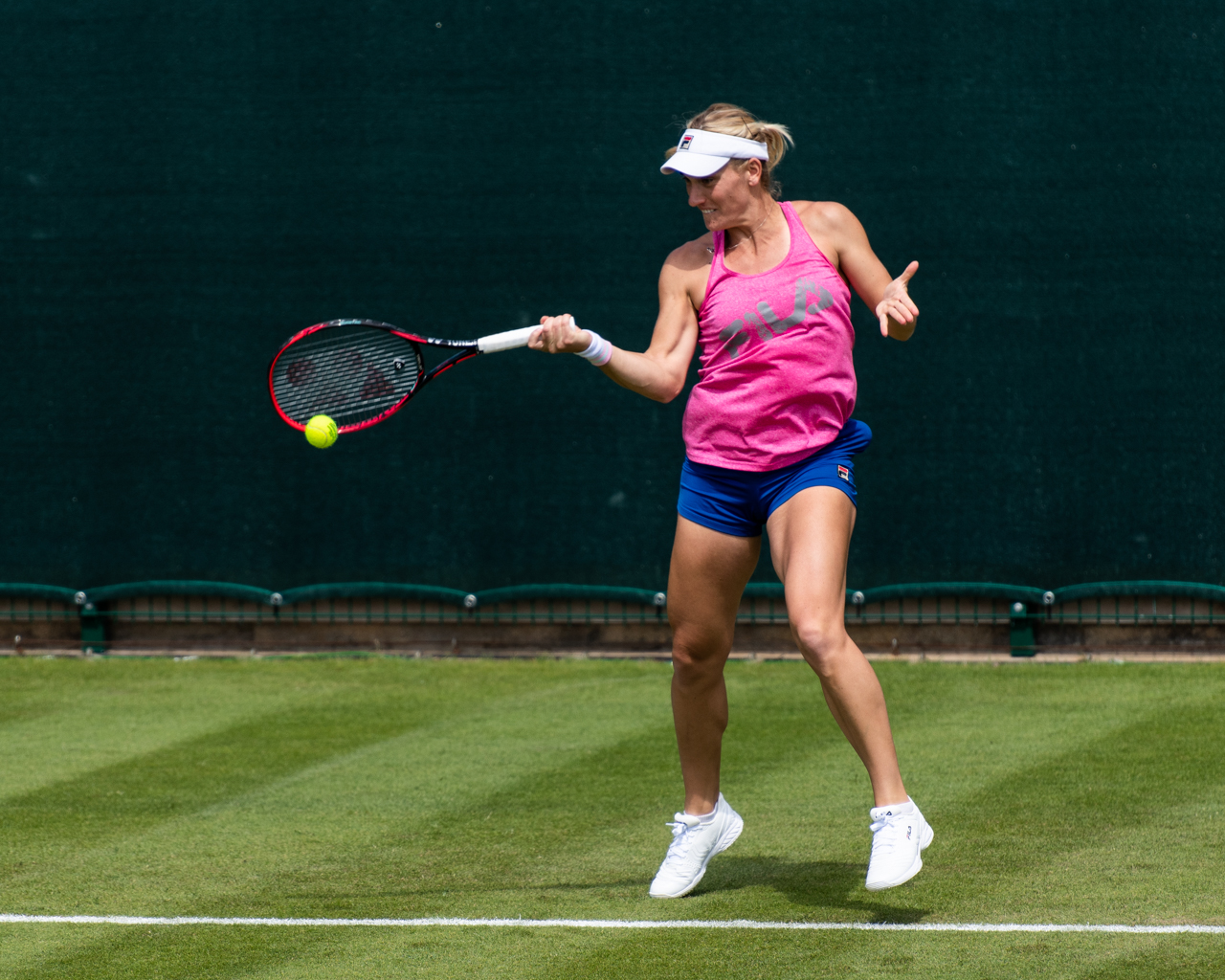
Babos hitting a forehand

Babos's playing style has been described as balanced, incorporating baseline play, slices, drop shots, and approaches to the net. Her father encouraged her to develop a neutral style rather than a primarily attacking or defensive one. Her serve has been noted as an important part of her game, particularly on faster surfaces such as grass and indoor hard courts. She grew up playing tennis on clay courts.

== Endorsements ==
Tímea Babos has plenty of sponsors. She has taken part in the MOL Talent Support Programme since 2008, and then in 2011, she became a participant in the MOL professional sponsorship programme. She uses VCORE-98 Racquet by Yonex. In 2016, she signed Sponsorship Agreement with Fila, previously having endorsement deals with Adidas and K-Swiss, that did not last long. Among her other sponsors, there are Samsung, Swedish drink brand "Vitamin Well", Hungarian company Cardo and Finnish brand Ice Power.

== Career statistics ==
=== Grand Slam tournament performance timeline ===
Key
| W | F | SF | QF | #R | RR | Q# | P# | DNQ | A | Z# | PO | G | S | B | NMS | NTI | P | NH |

(W) winner; (F) finalist; (SF) semifinalist; (QF) quarterfinalist; (#R) rounds 4, 3, 2, 1; (RR) round-robin stage; (Q#) qualification round; (P#) preliminary round; (DNQ) did not qualify; (A) absent; (Z#) Davis/Fed Cup Zonal Group (with number indication) or (PO) play-off; (G) gold, (S) silver or (B) bronze Olympic/Paralympic medal; (NMS) not a Masters tournament; (NTI) not a Tier I tournament; (P) postponed; (NH) not held; (SR) strike rate (events won / competed); (W–L) win–loss record.
To avoid confusion and double counting, these charts are updated at the conclusion of a tournament or when the player's participation has ended.

==== Singles ====
| Tournament | 2011 | 2012 | 2013 | 2014 | 2015 | 2016 | 2017 | 2018 | 2019 | 2020 | 2021 | 2022 | 2023 | 2024 | SR | W–L | Win % |
|---|---|---|---|---|---|---|---|---|---|---|---|---|---|---|---|---|---|
| Australian Open | A | Q2 | 1R | 1R | 1R | 2R | 1R | 2R | 2R | 1R | 2R | A | A | Q1 | 0 / 9 | 4–9 | 31% |
| French Open | A | 1R | Q2 | Q3 | 1R | 2R | 1R | 1R | 1R | 1R | Q2 | A | A | Q2 | 0 / 7 | 1–7 | 13% |
| Wimbledon | A | 2R | 1R | 1R | 2R | 2R | 1R | 1R | Q1 | NH | 1R | Q3 | Q1 | A | 0 / 8 | 3–8 | 27% |
| US Open | Q1 | 1R | 1R | 1R | 1R | 3R | 2R | 1R | 2R | 1R | A | A | Q2 | A | 0 / 9 | 4–9 | 31% |
| Win–loss | 0–0 | 1–3 | 0–3 | 0–3 | 1–4 | 5–4 | 1–4 | 1–4 | 2–3 | 0–3 | 1–2 | 0–0 | 0–0 | 0–0 | 0 / 33 | 12–33 | 27% |

==== Doubles ====
| Tournament | 2011 | 2012 | 2013 | 2014 | 2015 | 2016 | 2017 | 2018 | 2019 | 2020 | 2021 | 2022 | 2023 | 2024 | 2025 | 2026 | SR | W–L | Win% |
|---|---|---|---|---|---|---|---|---|---|---|---|---|---|---|---|---|---|---|---|
| Australian Open | A | A | 1R | 3R | 2R | 2R | 3R | W | F | W | A | A | 2R | 2R | 3R | 1R | 2 / 12 | 27–10 | 73% |
| French Open | A | 2R | 1R | 1R | 2R | 3R | 2R | QF | W | W | 1R | A | 2R | 1R | 3R | | 2 / 13 | 23–11 | 68% |
| Wimbledon | A | 1R | 1R | F | SF | F | 3R | QF | SF | NH | 1R | A | 3R | QF | QF | | 0 / 11 | 28–11 | 72% |
| US Open | A | 1R | 2R | 1R | 3R | 3R | QF | F | QF | 2R^{†} | A | A | 1R | 1R | QF | | 0 / 12 | 20–11 | 65% |
| Win–loss | 0–0 | 1–3 | 1–4 | 7–4 | 8–4 | 10–4 | 8–4 | 17–3 | 17–3 | 13–0 | 0–2 | 0–0 | 4–4 | 4–4 | 10-4 | 0–1 | 4 / 48 | 98–42 | 70% |
Year-end championships
| WTA Finals | Did not qualify | | | | RR | QF | W | W | W | NH | DNQ | | | | F | | 3 / 6 | 15–5 | 75% |
Career statistics
| Year-end ranking | 145 | 90 | 45 | 21 | 11 | 15 | 7 | 3 | 3 | 4 | 25 | 92 | 63 | 55 | 13 | | $9,596,841 | | |

Notes

- ^{†} Babos and Mladenovic were forced to withdraw before second-round match due to COVID-related precautions for Kristina Mladenovic.

=== Grand Slam tournament finals ===
==== Doubles: 8 (4 titles, 4 runner-ups) ====
| Result | Year | Championship | Surface | Partner | Opponents | Score |
|---|---|---|---|---|---|---|
| Loss | 2014 | Wimbledon | Grass | (France) Kristina Mladenovic | (Italy) Sara Errani (Italy) Roberta Vinci | 1–6, 3–6 |
| Loss | 2016 | Wimbledon | Grass | (Kazakhstan) Yaroslava Shvedova | (United States) Serena Williams (United States) Venus Williams | 3–6, 4–6 |
| Win | 2018 | Australian Open | Hard | (France) Kristina Mladenovic | (Russia) Ekaterina Makarova (Russia) Elena Vesnina | 6–4, 6–3 |
| Loss | 2018 | US Open | Hard | (France) Kristina Mladenovic | (Australia) Ashleigh Barty (United States) CoCo Vandeweghe | 6–3, 6–7^{(2–7)}, 6–7^{(6–8)} |
| Loss | 2019 | Australian Open | Hard | (France) Kristina Mladenovic | (Australia) Samantha Stosur (China) Zhang Shuai | 3–6, 4–6 |
| Win | 2019 | French Open | Clay | (France) Kristina Mladenovic | (China) Duan Yingying (China) Zheng Saisai | 6–2, 6–3 |
| Win | 2020 | Australian Open (2) | Hard | (France) Kristina Mladenovic | (Chinese Taipei) Hsieh Su-wei (Czech Republic) Barbora Strýcová | 6–2, 6–1 |
| Win | 2020 | French Open (2) | Clay | (France) Kristina Mladenovic | (Chile) Alexa Guarachi (United States) Desirae Krawczyk | 6–4, 7–5 |

==== Mixed doubles: 2 (2 runner-ups) ====
| Result | Year | Championship | Surface | Partner | Opponents | Score |
|---|---|---|---|---|---|---|
| Loss | 2015 | Wimbledon | Grass | (Austria) Alexander Peya | (India) Leander Paes (Switzerland) Martina Hingis | 1–6, 1–6 |
| Loss | 2018 | Australian Open | Hard | (India) Rohan Bopanna | (Canada) Gabriela Dabrowski (Croatia) Mate Pavić | 6–2, 4–6, [9–11] |

=== Year-end championships ===
==== Doubles: 4 (3 titles, 1 runner-up) ====
| Result | Year | Championship | Surface | Partner | Opponents | Score |
|---|---|---|---|---|---|---|
| Win | 2017 | WTA Finals, Singapore | Hard (i) | (Czech Republic) Andrea Hlaváčková | (Netherlands) Kiki Bertens (Sweden) Johanna Larsson | 4–6, 6–4, [10–5] |
| Win | 2018 | WTA Finals, Singapore (2) | Hard (i) | (France) Kristina Mladenovic | (Czech Republic) Barbora Krejčíková (Czech Republic) Kateřina Siniaková | 6–4, 7–5 |
| Win | 2019 | WTA Finals, China (3) | Hard (i) | (France) Kristina Mladenovic | (Chinese Taipei) Hsieh Su-wei (Czech Republic) Barbora Strýcová | 6–1, 6–3 |
| Loss | 2025 | WTA Finals, Saudi Arabia | Hard (i) | (Brazil) Luisa Stefani | Veronika Kudermetova (Belgium) Elise Mertens | 6–7^{(4–7)}, 1–6 |
