= 2011 EmblemHealth Bronx Open =

- Date: 8–14 August
- Edition: 12th
- Location: The Bronx, United States

Champions

Singles
- (Czech Republic) Andrea Hlaváčková

Doubles
- (United States) Megan Moulton-Levy / (United States) Ahsha Rolle
| ← 2010 · | EmblemHealth Bronx Open | · 2012 → |

The 2011 EmblemHealth Bronx Open was a professional tennis tournament played on hard courts. It was the 12th edition of the tournament which is part of the 2011 ITF Women's Circuit. It took place in Crotona Park, in The Bronx, United States between 8 and 14 August 2011.

== WTA entrants ==
=== Seeds ===
| Country | Player | Rank^{1} | Seed |
|---|---|---|---|
| GER | Mona Barthel | 104 | 1 |
| CZE | Andrea Hlaváčková | 113 | 2 |
| ITA | Romina Oprandi | 132 | 3 |
| UKR | Olga Savchuk | 148 | 4 |
| LUX | Anne Kremer | 152 | 5 |
| THA | Noppawan Lertcheewakarn | 157 | 6 |
| CHN | Han Xinyun | 159 | 7 |
| ROU | Mădălina Gojnea | 164 | 8 |

- ^{1} Rankings are as of August 1, 2011.

=== Other entrants ===
The following players received wildcards into the singles main draw:

- (United States) Madison Brengle
- (United States) Lauren Embree
- (United States) Ester Goldfeld
- (United States) Amanda McDowell

The following players received entry from the qualifying draw:

- (Kazakhstan) Yaroslava Shvedova
- (Russia) Elena Bovina
- (Belgium) Tamaryn Hendler
- (United States) Ahsha Rolle

== Champions ==
=== Singles ===
(Czech Republic) Andrea Hlaváčková def. (Germany) Mona Barthel, 7–6^{(10–8)}, 6–3

=== Doubles ===
(United States) Megan Moulton-Levy / (United States) Ahsha Rolle def. (China) Han Xinyun / (China) Lu Jingjing, 6–3, 7–6^{(7–5)}
