= 2011 EmblemHealth Bronx Open – Doubles =

Doubles
- 2011 EmblemHealth Bronx Open

Final
- Champion: (United States) Megan Moulton-Levy (United States) Ahsha Rolle
- Runner-up: (China) Han Xinyun (China) Lu Jingjing
- Score: 6–3, 7–6^{(7–5)}

Events
Singles	Doubles
← 2010 ·	EmblemHealth Bronx Open	· 2012 →

Kristina Barrois and Yvonne Meusburger were the defending champions, but both chose not to participate.
Megan Moulton-Levy and Ahsha Rolle won the title by defeating Han Xinyun and Lu Jingjing in the final 6–3, 7–6^{(7–5)}.

== Seeds ==
1. (Czech Republic) Andrea Hlaváčková / (Ukraine) Olga Savchuk (semifinals)
2. (Russia) Arina Rodionova / (Kazakhstan) Yaroslava Shvedova (first round)
3. (Russia) Elena Bovina / (Japan) Rika Fujiwara (first round)
4. (Thailand) Noppawan Lertcheewakarn / (France) Kristina Mladenovic (first round)

== Draw ==
=== Key ===
- Q = Qualifier
- WC = Wild card
- LL = Lucky loser
- Alt = Alternate
- SE = Special exempt
- PR = Protected ranking
- ITF = ITF entry
- JE = Junior exempt
- w/o = Walkover
- r = Retired
- d = Defaulted
- SR = Special ranking

=== Draw ===
First round
1	(Czech Republic) A Hlaváčková (Ukraine) O Savchuk	3	6	[10]
(United Kingdom) N Broady (Australia) I Holland	6	2	[5]
(United States) M Harkins (United States) E Lumpkin	4	3
(Czech Republic) Ka Plíšková (Czech Republic) Kr Plíšková	6	6
4	(Thailand) N Lertcheewakarn (France) K Mladenovic	6	4	[4]
(China) X Han (China) J Lu	2	6	[10]
(Japan) K Iijima (Australia) S Peers	4	6^{3}
(United States) B Augustine (United States) W Jones	6	7^{7}
(Latvia) L Dekmeijere (United States) A Mueller	6	6
(United States) S Marand (United States) A Weinhold	3	4
(United States) M Moulton-Levy (United States) A Rolle	7	2	[12]
3	(Russia) E Bovina (Japan) R Fujiwara	5	6	[10]
(Australia) C Dellacqua (Australia) O Rogowska	6	6
(Romania) M Gojnea (Luxembourg) A Kremer	2	2
WC	(United States) L Embree (United States) N Pluskota	6	6
2	(Russia) A Rodionova (Kazakhstan) Y Shvedova	4	4

Quarterfinals
1	(Czech Republic) A Hlaváčková (Ukraine) O Savchuk	7^{8}	6
(Czech Republic) Ka Plíšková (Czech Republic) Kr Plíšková	6^{6}	3
(China) X Han (China) J Lu	6	3	[10]
(United States) B Augustine (United States) W Jones	3	6	[8]
(Latvia) L Dekmeijere (United States) A Mueller	1	7^{12}	[9]
(United States) M Moulton-Levy (United States) A Rolle	6	6^{10}	[11]
(Australia) C Dellacqua (Australia) O Rogowska	6	6
WC	(United States) L Embree (United States) N Pluskota	2	3

Semifinals
1	(Czech Republic) A Hlaváčková (Ukraine) O Savchuk	4	2
(China) X Han (China) J Lu	6	6
(United States) M Moulton-Levy (United States) A Rolle	3	7	[10]
(Australia) C Dellacqua (Australia) O Rogowska	6	5	[3]

Finals
(China) X Han (China) J Lu	3	6^{5}
(United States) M Moulton-Levy (United States) A Rolle	6	7^{7}
