= 2014 Grand Prix SAR La Princesse Lalla Meryem =

- Date: 21 – 27 April
- Edition: 14th
- Category: WTA International
- Draw: 32S / 16D
- Prize money: $250,000
- Surface: Clay / outdoor
- Location: Marrakesh, Morocco
- Venue: Royal Tennis Club de Marrakech

Champions

Singles
- (Spain) María Teresa Torró Flor

Doubles
- (Spain) Garbiñe Muguruza / (Switzerland) Romina Oprandi
- Morocco Open

The 2014 Grand Prix SAR La Princesse Lalla Meryem was a professional women's tennis tournament played on clay courts. It was the 14th edition of the tournament which was part of the WTA International tournaments category of the 2014 WTA Tour. It took place at the Royal Tennis Club de Marrakech in Marrakesh, Morocco, between 21 and 27 April 2014.

== Points and prize money ==
=== Point distribution ===
Event	W	F	SF	QF	Round of 16	Round of 32	Q	Q3	Q2	Q1
Women's singles	280	180	110	60	30	1	18	14	10	1
Women's doubles	280	180	110	60	1	—N/a	—N/a	—N/a	—N/a	—N/a

=== Prize money ===
Event	W	F	SF	QF	Round of 16	Round of 32	Round of 64	Q2	Q1
Women's singles	$43,000	$21,400	$11,300	$5,900	$3,310	$1,925	$1,005	$730	$530
Women's doubles	$12,300	$6,400	$3,435	$1,820	$960	—N/a	—N/a	—N/a	—N/a

== Singles main draw entrants ==
=== Seeds ===
Country	Player	Rank^{1}	Seed
SVK	Daniela Hantuchová	30	1
UKR	Elina Svitolina	36	2
AUT	Yvonne Meusburger	37	3
SRB	Bojana Jovanovski	39	4
ESP	Garbiñe Muguruza	41	5
CHN	Peng Shuai	44	6
CHN	Zhang Shuai	45	7
ITA	Francesca Schiavone	47	8

- ^{1} Rankings as of 14 April 2014

=== Other entrants ===
The following players received wildcards into the singles main draw:

- (Morocco) Rita Atik
- (Slovakia) Daniela Hantuchová
- (Tunisia) Ons Jabeur

The following players received entry as qualifiers:

- (Spain) Lara Arruabarrena
- (Spain) Beatriz García Vidagany
- (Czech Republic) Renata Voráčová
- (Ukraine) Maryna Zanevska

The following player received entry as a lucky loser:

- (Italy) Anastasia Grymalska

=== Withdrawals ===
Before the tournament

- (Romania) Alexandra Dulgheru (right knee injury) → replaced by (Ukraine) Anastasia Grymalska
- (United States) Alison Riske → replaced by (Croatia) Petra Martić
- (United Kingdom) Laura Robson → replaced by (Spain) Estrella Cabeza Candela
- (Czech Republic) Barbora Záhlavová-Strýcová → replaced by (Switzerland) Romina Oprandi
- (Russia) Vera Zvonareva → replaced by (Belgium) Alison Van Uytvanck

During the tournament

- (China) Peng Shuai (left thigh injury)

== Doubles main draw entrants ==
=== Seeds ===
Country	Player	Country	Player	Rank^{1}	Seed
CRO	Darija Jurak	USA	Megan Moulton-Levy	103	1
AUT	Sandra Klemenschits	SLO	Andreja Klepač	122	2
CRO	Petra Martić	CZE	Renata Voráčová	136	3
ESP	Lourdes Domínguez Lino	ESP	Arantxa Parra Santonja	141	4

- ^{1} Rankings as of 14 April 2014

=== Other entrants ===
The following pairs received wildcards into the doubles main draw:

- (Morocco) Rita Atik / (Morocco) Lina Qostal
- (Morocco) Ghita Benhadi / (Morocco) Zaineb El Houari

=== Withdrawals ===
During the tournament

- (South Africa) Chanelle Scheepers (right knee injury)

== Champions ==
=== Singles ===
- (Spain) María Teresa Torró Flor def. (Switzerland) Romina Oprandi 6–3, 3–6, 6–3

=== Doubles ===
- (Spain) Garbiñe Muguruza / (Switzerland) Romina Oprandi def. (Poland) Katarzyna Piter / (Ukraine) Maryna Zanevska, 4–6, 6–2, [11–9]
