= 2019 Bronx Open – Doubles =

Tennis tournament - women's doubles

Doubles
- 2019 Bronx Open

Final
- Champions: (Croatia) Darija Jurak (Spain) María José Martínez Sánchez
- Runners-up: (Russia) Margarita Gasparyan (Romania) Monica Niculescu
- Score: 7–5, 2–6, [10–7]

Events
| Singles | Doubles |
| ← 2012 · | Bronx Open | · 2022 → |

Shuko Aoyama and Erika Sema were the defending champions, having won the last edition in 2012 as an ITF tournament, but Sema chose not to participate. Aoyama partnered alongside Aleksandra Krunić, but lost in the semifinals to Margarita Gasparyan and Monica Niculescu.

Darija Jurak and María José Martínez Sánchez won the title, defeating Gasparyan and Niculescu in the final, 7–5, 2–6, [10–7].

== Seeds ==
1. (Australia) Samantha Stosur / (China) Zhang Shuai (quarterfinals)
2. (Chinese Taipei) Chan Hao-ching / (Chinese Taipei) Latisha Chan (semifinals)
3. (Croatia) Darija Jurak / (Spain) María José Martínez Sánchez (champions)
4. (United States) Desirae Krawczyk / (Poland) Alicja Rosolska (first round)

== Draw ==
=== Key ===
- Q = Qualifier
- WC = Wild card
- LL = Lucky loser
- Alt = Alternate
- SE = Special exempt
- PR = Protected ranking
- ITF = ITF entry
- JE = Junior exempt
- w/o = Walkover
- r = Retired
- d = Defaulted
- SR = Special ranking

=== Draw ===
First round
1 | (Australia) S Stosur (China) S Zhang | 6 | 6
(Belarus) L Marozava (Slovenia) K Srebotnik | 4 | 2
WC | (Chinese Taipei) S-w Hsieh (Chinese Taipei) Y-c Hsieh | 1 | 5
(Russia) M Gasparyan (Romania) M Niculescu | 6 | 7
4 | (United States) D Krawczyk (Poland) A Rosolska | 1 | 3
(Romania) R Olaru (China) Z Yang | 6 | 6
(Japan) S Aoyama (Serbia) A Krunić | 6 | 6
(Ukraine) N Kichenok (Germany) L Siegemund | 3 | 4
WC | (United States) K Ahn (United States) V King | 7 | 4 | [10]
(China) Y Duan (Czech Republic) R Voráčová | 5 | 6 | [8]
(Australia) M Adamczak (Australia) S Sanders | 6 | 4 | [9]
3 | (Croatia) D Jurak (Spain) MJ Martínez Sánchez | 2 | 6 | [11]
(Ukraine) L Kichenok (Kazakhstan) G Voskoboeva | 6 | 5 | [10]
(Georgia (country)) O Kalashnikova (United States) M Sanchez | 2 | 7 | [6]
(Slovakia) V Kužmová (Belarus) A Sasnovich | 1 | 0
2 | (Chinese Taipei) H-c Chan (Chinese Taipei) L Chan | 6 | 6

Quarterfinals
1 | (Australia) S Stosur (China) S Zhang | 6^{4} | 2
(Russia) M Gasparyan (Romania) M Niculescu | 7^{7} | 6
(Romania) R Olaru (China) Z Yang | 6 | 1 | [9]
(Japan) S Aoyama (Serbia) A Krunić | 0 | 6 | [11]
WC | (United States) K Ahn (United States) V King | 6 | 0 | [3]
3 | (Croatia) D Jurak (Spain) MJ Martínez Sánchez | 0 | 6 | [10]
(Ukraine) L Kichenok (Kazakhstan) G Voskoboeva | 3 | 4
2 | (Chinese Taipei) H-c Chan (Chinese Taipei) L Chan | 6 | 6

Semifinals
(Russia) M Gasparyan (Romania) M Niculescu | 6 | 4 | [11]
(Japan) S Aoyama (Serbia) A Krunić | 4 | 6 | [9]
3 | (Croatia) D Jurak (Spain) MJ Martínez Sánchez | 1 | 6 | [12]
2 | (Chinese Taipei) H-c Chan (Chinese Taipei) L Chan | 6 | 3 | [10]

Final
(Russia) M Gasparyan (Romania) M Niculescu | 5 | 6 | [7]
3 | (Croatia) D Jurak (Spain) MJ Martínez Sánchez | 7 | 2 | [10]
