= 2011 USTA Tennis Classic of Troy =

- Date: 10–16 October
- Edition: 9th
- Location: Troy, Alabama, United States

Champions

Singles
- (Italy) Romina Oprandi

Doubles
- (Russia) Elena Bovina / (Russia) Valeria Savinykh
← 2010 ·	USTA Tennis Classic of Troy	· 2012 →

The 2011 USTA Tennis Classic of Troy was a professional tennis tournament played on hard courts. It was the ninth edition of the tournament which is part of the 2011 ITF Women's Circuit. It took place in Troy, Alabama, United States between 10 and 16 October 2011.

== WTA entrants ==
=== Seeds ===
Country	Player	Rank^{1}	Seed
ITA	Romina Oprandi	100	1
USA	Varvara Lepchenko	114	2
RUS	Valeria Savinykh	124	3
ITA	Camila Giorgi	144	4
USA	Melanie Oudin	146	5
CAN	Sharon Fichman	162	6
CRO	Ajla Tomljanović	164	7
USA	Chichi Scholl	170	8

- ^{1} Rankings are as of October 3, 2011.

=== Other entrants ===
The following players received wildcards into the singles main draw:

- (United States) Ryann Foster
- (United States) Chieh-yu Hsu
- (United States) Melanie Oudin

The following players received entry from the qualifying draw:

- (Russia) Elena Bovina
- (United States) Grace Min
- (Canada) Marie-Ève Pelletier
- (United States) Shelby Rogers

The following players received entry by a lucky loser spot:

- (United States) Alexis King

== Champions ==
=== Singles ===
(Italy) Romina Oprandi def. (United States) Varvara Lepchenko, 6–1, 6–2

=== Doubles ===
(Russia) Elena Bovina / (Russia) Valeria Savinykh def. (United States) Varvara Lepchenko / (United States) Mashona Washington, 7–6^{(8–6)}, 6–3
