= 2014 Grand Prix SAR La Princesse Lalla Meryem – Doubles =

Doubles
- 2014 Grand Prix SAR La Princesse Lalla Meryem

Final
- Champions: (Spain) Garbiñe Muguruza (Switzerland) Romina Oprandi
- Runners-up: (Poland) Katarzyna Piter (Ukraine) Maryna Zanevska
- Score: 4-6, 6-2, [11-9]

Events
Singles	Doubles
← 2013 ·	Grand Prix SAR La Princesse Lalla Meryem	· 2015 →

Tímea Babos and Mandy Minella were the defending champions, but they decided not to participate. Garbiñe Muguruza and Romina Oprandi are the new champions, defeating in the final Katarzyna Piter and Maryna Zanevska with the score 4–6, 6–2, [11-9].

== Seeds ==
1. (Croatia) Darija Jurak / (United States) Megan Moulton-Levy (semifinals)
2. (Austria) Sandra Klemenschits / (Slovenia) Andreja Klepač (semifinals)
3. (Croatia) Petra Martić / (Czech Republic) Renata Voráčová (first round)
4. (Spain) Lourdes Domínguez Lino / (Spain) Arantxa Parra Santonja (first round)

== Draw ==
Key

- Q = Qualifier
- WC = Wild card
- LL = Lucky loser
- Alt = Alternate
- ITF = ITF entry
- PR = Protected ranking
- SR = Special ranking
- SE = Special exempt
- JE = Junior exempt
- JR = Junior Accelerator Programme entrant
- CO = College Accelerator Programme entrant
- NG = Next Gen Accelerator Program entrant
- w/o = Walkover
- r = Retired
- d = Defaulted

=== Draw ===
First round
1	(Croatia) D Jurak (United States) M Moulton-Levy	6	5	[10]
(Russia) M Gasparyan (Russia) M Melnikova	4	7	[8]
(Argentina) T Búa (Chile) D Seguel	7^{7}	6
(Italy) N Clerico (Czech Republic) N Fraňková	6^{0}	3
4	(Spain) L Domínguez Lino (Spain) A Parra Santonja	2	3
(Spain) G Muguruza (Switzerland) R Oprandi	6	6
(Ukraine) I Buryachok (Russia) V Solovyeva	6	6
WC	(Morocco) R Atik (Morocco) L Qostal	1	2
(Poland) K Piter (Ukraine) M Zanevska	6	6
WC	(Morocco) G Benhadi (Morocco) Z El Houari	3	0
(France) S Foretz Gacon (Czech Republic) E Hrdinová	7^{7}	6
3	(Croatia) P Martić (Czech Republic) R Voráčová	6^{4}	2
(Spain) L Arruabarrena (Spain) I Ferrer Suárez	3	4
(Israel) J Glushko (Israel) S Pe'er	6	6
(Czech Republic) P Cetkovská (South Africa) C Scheepers
2	(Austria) S Klemenschits (Slovenia) A Klepač	w/o

Quarterfinals
1	(Croatia) D Jurak (United States) M Moulton-Levy	3	7^{7}	[10]
(Argentina) T Búa (Chile) D Seguel	6	6^{5}	[5]
(Spain) G Muguruza (Switzerland) R Oprandi	6	2	[10]
(Ukraine) I Buryachok (Russia) V Solovyeva	4	6	[6]
(Poland) K Piter (Ukraine) M Zanevska	6	6
(France) S Foretz Gacon (Czech Republic) E Hrdinová	2	1
(Israel) J Glushko (Israel) S Pe'er	3	3
2	(Austria) S Klemenschits (Slovenia) A Klepač	6	6

Semifinals
1	(Croatia) D Jurak (United States) M Moulton-Levy	3	5
(Spain) G Muguruza (Switzerland) R Oprandi	6	7
(Poland) K Piter (Ukraine) M Zanevska	6	3	[10]
2	(Austria) S Klemenschits (Slovenia) A Klepač	4	6	[4]

Final
(Spain) G Muguruza (Switzerland) R Oprandi	4	6	[11]
(Poland) K Piter (Ukraine) M Zanevska	6	2	[9]
