= 2011 EmblemHealth Bronx Open – Singles =

Singles
- 2011 EmblemHealth Bronx Open

Final
- Champion: (Czech Republic) Andrea Hlaváčková
- Runner-up: (Germany) Mona Barthel
- Score: 7–6^{(10–8)}, 6–3

Events
Singles	Doubles
← 2010 ·	EmblemHealth Bronx Open	· 2012 →

Anna Chakvetadze was the defending champion, but chose not to participate.
Andrea Hlaváčková won the title by defeating Mona Barthel in the final 7–6^{(10–8)}, 6–3.

== Seeds ==
1. (Germany) Mona Barthel (final)
2. (Czech Republic) Andrea Hlaváčková (champion)
3. (Italy) Romina Oprandi (quarterfinals)
4. (Ukraine) Olga Savchuk (first round)
5. (Luxembourg) Anne Kremer (first round)
6. (Thailand) Noppawan Lertcheewakarn (first round)
7. (China) Han Xinyun (first round)
8. (Romania) Mădălina Gojnea (semifinals)

== Main draw ==
=== Key ===
- Q = Qualifier
- WC = Wild card
- LL = Lucky loser
- Alt = Alternate
- SE = Special exempt
- PR = Protected ranking
- ITF = ITF entry
- JE = Junior exempt
- w/o = Walkover
- r = Retired
- d = Defaulted
- SR = Special ranking

=== Finals ===
Semifinals
1	(Germany) Mona Barthel	6	6
(Italy) Camila Giorgi	3	4
8	(Romania) Mădălina Gojnea	6	3	3
2	(Czech Republic) Andrea Hlaváčková	0	6	6

Final
1	(Germany) Mona Barthel	6^{8}	3
2	(Czech Republic) Andrea Hlaváčková	7^{10}	6

=== Top half ===
First round
1	(Germany) M Barthel	5	7	6
(United States) A Weinhold	7	5	2
(New Zealand) S Jones	7^{7}	2	1
(Czech Republic) Kr Plíšková	6^{2}	6	6
(Australia) S Peers	6	6
(Russia) A Rodionova	2	2
(Czech Republic) Ka Plíšková	6	6
7	(China) X Han	3	2
4	(Ukraine) O Savchuk	5	5
(Italy) C Giorgi	7	7
(Australia) I Holland	6^{5}	6	6
(Israel) J Glushko	7^{7}	4	0
(China) J Lu	3	2
WC	(United States) M Brengle	6	6
Q	(Russia) E Bovina	5	6	7^{7}
5	(Luxembourg) A Kremer	7	2	6^{4}

Second round
1	(Germany) M Barthel	6	6
(Czech Republic) Kr Plíšková	4	1
(Australia) S Peers	1	4
(Czech Republic) Ka Plíšková	6	6
(Italy) C Giorgi	6	6
(Australia) I Holland	1	1
WC	(United States) M Brengle	6	6
Q	(Russia) E Bovina	3	2

Quarterfinals
1	(Germany) M Barthel	6	6
(Czech Republic) Ka Plíšková	1	1
(Italy) C Giorgi	3	7^{7}	6
WC	(United States) M Brengle	6	6^{1}	3

Semifinals
1	(Germany) M Barthel	6	6
(Italy) C Giorgi	3	4

=== Bottom half ===
First round
8	(Romania) M Gojnea	6	6
(Japan) K Iijima	1	0
WC	(United States) E Goldfeld	2	3
(France) K Mladenovic	6	6
Q	(Kazakhstan) Y Shvedova	7^{7}	6
WC	(United States) A McDowell	6^{4}	1
(Japan) R Fujiwara	6	2	2
3	(Italy) R Oprandi	4	6	6
6	(Thailand) N Lertcheewakarn	5	6	1
Q	(United States) A Rolle	7	3	6
Q	(Belgium) T Hendler	1	6	7^{7}
(Australia) O Rogowska	6	3	6^{6}
WC	(United States) L Embree	6	0	3
(Croatia) A Tomljanović	2	6	6
(United States) J Cohen	1	3
2	(Czech Republic) A Hlaváčková	6	6

Second round
8	(Romania) M Gojnea	6	6
(France) K Mladenovic	2	1
Q	(Kazakhstan) Y Shvedova	7^{9}	0
3	(Italy) R Oprandi	6^{7}	2
Q	(United States) A Rolle	6	1	1
Q	(Belgium) T Hendler	3	6	6
(Croatia) A Tomljanović	2	6	0
2	(Czech Republic) A Hlaváčková	6	3	6

Quarterfinals
8	(Romania) M Gojnea	6	5	6
3	(Italy) R Oprandi	0	7	0
Q	(Belgium) T Hendler	6	3	1
2	(Czech Republic) A Hlaváčková	2	6	6

Semifinals
8	(Romania) M Gojnea	6	3	3
2	(Czech Republic) A Hlaváčková	0	6	6
