= 2012 EmblemHealth Bronx Open – Singles =

Singles
- 2012 EmblemHealth Bronx Open

Final
- Champion: (Switzerland) Romina Oprandi
- Runner-up: (Russia) Anna Chakvetadze
- Score: 5–7, 6–3, 6–3

Events
Singles	Doubles
← 2011 ·	EmblemHealth Bronx Open	· 2019 →

Andrea Hlaváčková was the defending champion, but chose to participate at the 2012 Rogers Cup instead.

Romina Oprandi won the title defeating Anna Chakvetadze in the final 5–7, 6–3, 6–3.

== Seeds ==
1. (Switzerland) Romina Oprandi (champion)
2. (Australia) Casey Dellacqua (second round)
3. (Czech Republic) Karolína Plíšková (first round)
4. (Australia) Olivia Rogowska (first round)
5. (Argentina) Paula Ormaechea (quarterfinals)
6. (Czech Republic) Kristýna Plíšková (second round)
7. (Japan) Erika Sema (second round)
8. (Germany) Tatjana Malek (quarterfinals)

== Main draw ==
=== Key ===
- Q = Qualifier
- WC = Wild card
- LL = Lucky loser
- Alt = Alternate
- SE = Special exempt
- PR = Protected ranking
- ITF = ITF entry
- JE = Junior exempt
- w/o = Walkover
- r = Retired
- d = Defaulted
- SR = Special ranking

=== Finals ===
Semifinals
1	(Switzerland) Romina Oprandi	6	7^{7}
(United States) Chichi Scholl	0	6^{4}
(United States) Alison Riske	2	1
(Russia) Anna Chakvetadze	6	6

Final
1	(Switzerland) Romina Oprandi	5	6	6
(Russia) Anna Chakvetadze	7	3	3

=== Top half ===
First round
1	(Switzerland) R Oprandi	6	6
(United Kingdom) N Broady	2	1
Q	(Japan) E Hozumi	6^{6}	6	0
Q	(United States) A Will	7^{8}	4	6
(Serbia) A Krunić	3	3
(Ukraine) E Svitolina	6	6
(Venezuela) G Paz	6^{0}	2
8	(Germany) T Malek	7^{7}	6
4	(Australia) O Rogowska	4	1
(United States) C Scholl	6	6
Q	(United States) J Abaza	6	1	7
(Venezuela) A Pérez	4	6	5
WC	(United States) J Elbaba	1	1
(United Kingdom) J Konta	6	6
(Russia) O Puchkova	6	5	5
7	(Japan) E Sema	2	7	7

Second round
1	(Switzerland) R Oprandi	6	6
Q	(United States) A Will	2	4
(Ukraine) E Svitolina	4	2
8	(Germany) T Malek	6	6
(United States) C Scholl	7^{7}	6
Q	(United States) J Abaza	6^{3}	3
(United Kingdom) J Konta	6	6
7	(Japan) E Sema	2	4

Quarterfinals
1	(Switzerland) R Oprandi	6	6
8	(Germany) T Malek	3	3
(United States) C Scholl	6
(United Kingdom) J Konta	3	r

Semifinals
1	(Switzerland) R Oprandi	6	7^{7}
(United States) C Scholl	0	6^{4}

=== Bottom half ===
First round
5	(Argentina) P Ormaechea	6	6
WC	(United States) J Cako	4	1
(France) I Pavlovic	6	6
WC	(United States) E Raszkiewicz	2	1
(United States) C-Y Hsu	6	3	7
Q	(United Kingdom) E Webley-Smith	2	6	5
(United States) A Riske	3	7^{7}	6
3	(Czech Republic) Ka Plíšková	6	6^{5}	2
6	(Czech Republic) Kr Plíšková	6	4	7^{7}
(Russia) M Sirotkina	4	6	6^{3}
(Brazil) T Pereira	1	2
(Russia) A Chakvetadze	6	6
SR	(United States) L Albanese	2	1
(Serbia) V Dolonc	6	6
(Japan) S Aoyama	4	4
2	(Australia) C Dellacqua	6	6

Second round
5	(Argentina) P Ormaechea	6	6
(France) I Pavlovic	4	2
(United States) C-Y Hsu	4	6^{4}
(United States) A Riske	6	7^{7}
6	(Czech Republic) Kr Plíšková	1	5
(Russia) A Chakvetadze	6	7
(Serbia) V Dolonc	3	7	6
2	(Australia) C Dellacqua	6	5	3

Quarterfinals
5	(Argentina) P Ormaechea	6	3	2
(United States) A Riske	3	6	6
(Russia) A Chakvetadze	3	6	6
(Serbia) V Dolonc	6	2	3

Semifinals
(United States) A Riske	2	1
(Russia) A Chakvetadze	6	6
