= 2013 Grand Prix SAR La Princesse Lalla Meryem =

- Date: 22 – 28 April
- Edition: 13th
- Category: WTA International
- Draw: 32S / 16D
- Prize money: $235,000
- Surface: Clay / outdoor
- Location: Marrakesh, Morocco
- Venue: Royal Tennis Club de Marrakech

Champions

Singles
- (Italy) Francesca Schiavone

Doubles
- (Hungary) Tímea Babos / (Luxembourg) Mandy Minella
- Morocco Open

The 2013 Grand Prix SAR La Princesse Lalla Meryem was a professional women's tennis tournament played on outdoor clay courts. It was the 13th edition of the tournament which was part of the WTA International tournaments of the 2013 WTA Tour. It took place at the Royal Tennis Club de Marrakech in Marrakesh, Morocco between 22 and 28 April 2013.

== Singles main draw entrants ==
=== Seeds ===
Country	Player	Rank^{1}	Seed
~~SVK~~	~~Dominika Cibulková~~	~~15~~	~~1~~
ROU	Sorana Cîrstea	26	2
FRA	Alizé Cornet	33	3
EST	Kaia Kanepi	40	4
NED	Kiki Bertens	41	5
ITA	Francesca Schiavone	47	6
FRA	Kristina Mladenovic	51	7
~~SUI~~	~~Romina Oprandi~~	~~52~~	~~8~~
BUL	Tsvetana Pironkova	53	9

- ^{1} Rankings are as of April 15, 2013.

=== Other entrants ===
The following players received wildcards into the singles main draw:

- (Morocco) Fatima Zahrae El Allami
- (Morocco) Lina Qostal

The following players received entry as qualifiers:

- (Hungary) Tímea Babos
- (Spain) Estrella Cabeza Candela
- (Slovakia) Michaela Hončová
- (Italy) Karin Knapp

The following players received entry as lucky losers:

- (Russia) Nina Bratchikova
- (Romania) Alexandra Cadanțu

=== Withdrawals ===
Before the tournament

- (Romania) Irina-Camelia Begu (right shoulder injury)
- (Slovakia) Dominika Cibulková
- (Slovenia) Polona Hercog
- (Switzerland) Romina Oprandi
- (Canada) Aleksandra Wozniak

== Doubles main draw entrants ==
=== Seeds ===
Country	Player	Country	Player	Rank^{1}	Seed
SVK	Daniela Hantuchová	ESP	Anabel Medina Garrigues	73	1
ITA	Flavia Pennetta	ITA	Francesca Schiavone	95	2
HUN	Tímea Babos	LUX	Mandy Minella	101	3
CRO	Petra Martić	FRA	Kristina Mladenovic	114	4

- ^{1} Rankings are as of April 15, 2013.

=== Other entrants ===
The following pairs received wildcards into the doubles main draw:

- (Morocco) Fatima Zahrae El Allami / (Morocco) Nadia Lalami
- (France) Alizé Lim / (Morocco) Lina Qostal

== Champions ==
=== Singles ===
- (Italy) Francesca Schiavone def. (Spain) Lourdes Domínguez Lino, 6–1, 6–3

=== Doubles ===
- (Hungary) Tímea Babos / (Luxembourg) Mandy Minella def. (Croatia) Petra Martić / (France) Kristina Mladenovic, 6–3, 6–1
