= 2011 USTA Tennis Classic of Troy – Doubles =

Doubles
- 2011 USTA Tennis Classic of Troy

Final
- Champions: (Russia) Elena Bovina (Russia) Valeria Savinykh
- Runners-up: (United States) Varvara Lepchenko (United States) Mashona Washington
- Score: 7–6^{(8–6)}, 6–3

Events
Singles	Doubles
← 2010 ·	USTA Tennis Classic of Troy	· 2012 →

Madison Brengle and Asia Muhammed were the defending champions, but Muhammed chose not to participate. Brengle partnered up with Amanda McDowell, but lost in the first round to Gail Brodsky and Alyona Sotnikova.
Elena Bovina and Valeria Savinykh won the title by defeating Varvara Lepchenko and Mashona Washington in the final 7–6^{(8–6)}, 6–3.

== Seeds ==
1. (Canada) Sharon Fichman / (Canada) Marie-Ève Pelletier (first round)
2. (Russia) Elena Bovina / (Russia) Valeria Savinykh (champions)
3. (United States) Macall Harkins / (United States) Ahsha Rolle (first round)
4. (Croatia) Maria Abramović / (Czech Republic) Eva Hrdinová (semifinals)

== Draw ==
=== Key ===
- Q = Qualifier
- WC = Wild card
- LL = Lucky loser
- Alt = Alternate
- SE = Special exempt
- PR = Protected ranking
- ITF = ITF entry
- JE = Junior exempt
- w/o = Walkover
- r = Retired
- d = Defaulted
- SR = Special ranking

=== Draw ===
First round
1	(Canada) S Fichman (Canada) M-È Pelletier	2	3
(United States) V Lepchenko (United States) M Washington	6	6
(Colombia) C Castaño (Colombia) M Duque	0	4
(Canada) E Bouchard (United States) M Oudin	6	6
3	(United States) M Harkins (United States) A Rolle	3	2
(Hungary) T Babos (Croatia) A Tomljanović	6	6
Alt	(United States) C-y Hsu (Slovenia) P Rampre
Alt	(Russia) A Gabueva (Colombia) Y Lizarazo	w/o
Alt	(China) Y Duan (France) A Lim	6^{3}	0
WC	(United States) N Melichar (United States) A Weinhold	7^{7}	6
(Paraguay) V Cepede Royg (Brazil) R Vaisemberg	6	3^{r}
4	(Croatia) M Abramović (Czech Republic) E Hrdinová	2	2
WC	(United States) M Brengle (United States) A McDowell	4	2
(United States) G Brodsky (Ukraine) A Sotnikova	6	6
(United States) W Jones (United States) E Lumpkin	3	7	[4]
2	(Russia) E Bovina (Russia) V Savinykh	6	5	[10]

Quarterfinals
(United States) V Lepchenko (United States) M Washington	6	3	[11]
(Canada) E Bouchard (United States) M Oudin	0	6	[9]
(Hungary) T Babos (Croatia) A Tomljanović	6	6
Alt	(Russia) A Gabueva (Colombia) Y Lizarazo	3	4
WC	(United States) N Melichar (United States) A Weinhold	6	4	[5]
4	(Croatia) M Abramović (Czech Republic) E Hrdinová	2	6	[10]
(United States) G Brodsky (Ukraine) A Sotnikova	1	3
2	(Russia) E Bovina (Russia) V Savinykh	6	6

Semifinals
(United States) V Lepchenko (United States) M Washington	7^{7}	6
(Hungary) T Babos (Croatia) A Tomljanović	6^{2}	2
4	(Croatia) M Abramović (Czech Republic) E Hrdinová	3	4
2	(Russia) E Bovina (Russia) V Savinykh	6	6

Finals
(United States) V Lepchenko (United States) M Washington	6^{6}	3
2	(Russia) E Bovina (Russia) V Savinykh	7^{8}	6
