= 2013 Grand Prix SAR La Princesse Lalla Meryem – Singles =

Singles
- 2013 Grand Prix SAR La Princesse Lalla Meryem

Final
- Champion: (Italy) Francesca Schiavone
- Runner-up: (Spain) Lourdes Domínguez Lino
- Score: 6–1, 6–3

Events
Singles	Doubles
- Grand Prix SAR La Princesse Lalla Meryem

Kiki Bertens was the defending champion, but lost in the quarterfinals to Lourdes Domínguez Lino.

Francesca Schiavone won the title, defeating Domínguez Lino in the final, 6–1, 6–3.

== Seeds ==
1. (Slovakia) Dominika Cibulková (withdrew)
2. (Romania) Sorana Cîrstea (first round)
3. (France) Alizé Cornet (quarterfinals)
4. (Estonia) Kaia Kanepi (second round)
5. (Netherlands) Kiki Bertens (quarterfinals)
6. (Italy) Francesca Schiavone (champion)
7. (France) Kristina Mladenovic (quarterfinals)
8. (Switzerland) Romina Oprandi (withdrew)
9. (Bulgaria) Tsvetana Pironkova (second round)

== Draw ==
Key

- Q = Qualifier
- WC = Wild card
- LL = Lucky loser
- Alt = Alternate
- ITF = ITF entry
- PR = Protected ranking
- SR = Special ranking
- SE = Special exempt
- JE = Junior exempt
- JR = Junior Accelerator Programme entrant
- CO = College Accelerator Programme entrant
- NG = Next Gen Accelerator Program entrant
- w/o = Walkover
- r = Retired
- d = Defaulted

=== Finals ===
Semifinals
(Spain) Lourdes Domínguez Lino	2	6	6
(Luxembourg) Mandy Minella	6	0	1
6	(Italy) Francesca Schiavone	7^{7}	6
(South Africa) Chanelle Scheepers	6^{4}	1

Final
(Spain) Lourdes Domínguez Lino	1	3
6	(Italy) Francesca Schiavone	6	6

=== Top half ===
First round
9	(Bulgaria) T Pironkova	7	6
(Czech Republic) Ka Plíšková	5	1
(Spain) L Domínguez Lino	6	4	6
(Japan) M Doi	2	6	2
(Hungary) M Czink	1	6^{2}
(Italy) F Pennetta	6	7^{7}
Q	(Hungary) T Babos	5	2
5	(Netherlands) K Bertens	7	6
4	(Estonia) K Kanepi	4	6	6
(Spain) A Medina Garrigues	6	3	2
(Luxembourg) M Minella	7^{7}	4	7
Q	(Spain) E Cabeza Candela	6^{3}	6	5
(Slovakia) D Hantuchová	6	6^{5}	5
(Russia) O Puchkova	3	7^{7}	7
(Spain) S Soler Espinosa	7^{7}	6
Q	(Slovakia) M Hončová	6^{4}	2

Second round
9	(Bulgaria) T Pironkova	6	4	3
(Spain) L Domínguez Lino	1	6	6
(Italy) F Pennetta	6^{0}	6	4
5	(Netherlands) K Bertens	7^{7}	4	6
4	(Estonia) K Kanepi	6	4	3
(Luxembourg) M Minella	3	6	6
(Russia) O Puchkova	0	3
(Spain) S Soler Espinosa	6	6

Quarterfinals
(Spain) L Domínguez Lino	6	4	6
5	(Netherlands) K Bertens	4	6	3
(Luxembourg) M Minella	6	3	6
(Spain) S Soler Espinosa	3	6	3

Semifinals
(Spain) L Domínguez Lino	2	6	6
(Luxembourg) M Minella	6	0	1

=== Bottom half ===
First round
6	(Italy) F Schiavone	7^{10}	6
(Croatia) P Martić	6^{8}	4
LL	(Russia) N Bratchikova	1	3
(Romania) S Halep	6	6
WC	(Morocco) L Qostal	0	1
Q	(Italy) K Knapp	6	6
WC	(Morocco) FZ El Allami	1	1
3	(France) A Cornet	6	6
7	(France) K Mladenovic	6	4	6
LL	(Romania) A Cadanțu	4	6	4
(Kazakhstan) Y Putintseva	6	6
(France) M Johansson	3	4
(Netherlands) A Rus	1	1
(Spain) MT Torró Flor	6	6
(South Africa) C Scheepers	6	6
2	(Romania) S Cîrstea	3	1

Second round
6	(Italy) F Schiavone	6	6
(Romania) S Halep	3	2
Q	(Italy) K Knapp	6	5	0
3	(France) A Cornet	1	7	6
7	(France) K Mladenovic	6	6
(Kazakhstan) Y Putintseva	3	3
(Spain) MT Torró Flor	2	1
(South Africa) C Scheepers	6	6

Quarterfinals
6	(Italy) F Schiavone	6	6
3	(France) A Cornet	4	4
7	(France) K Mladenovic	1	2
(South Africa) C Scheepers	6	6

Semifinals
6	(Italy) F Schiavone	7^{7}	6
(South Africa) C Scheepers	6^{4}	1

== Qualifying ==
=== Seeds ===
1. (Romania) Alexandra Cadanțu (qualifying competition, lucky loser)
2. (Italy) Karin Knapp (qualified)
3. (Portugal) Maria João Koehler (second round)
4. (Russia) Nina Bratchikova (qualifying competition, lucky loser)
5. (Spain) Estrella Cabeza Candela (qualified)
6. (Hungary) Tímea Babos (qualified)
7. (Brazil) Teliana Pereira (qualifying competition)
8. (France) Stéphanie Foretz-Gacon (qualifying competition)

=== Qualifiers ===
1. (Hungary) Tímea Babos
2. (Italy) Karin Knapp
3. (Slovakia) Michaela Hončová
4. (Spain) Estrella Cabeza Candela

=== Lucky losers ===
1. (Russia) Nina Bratchikova
2. (Romania) Alexandra Cadanțu

=== Draw ===
==== First qualifier ====
First round
1	(Romania) Alexandra Cadanțu	6	6
(Poland) Paula Kania	4	4
(Russia) Valeria Solovyeva	6	6
(France) Virginie Razzano	4	3
(France) Aravane Rezaï	3	7	6
(Russia) Valeria Savinykh	6	5	2
(Ukraine) Olga Savchuk	6	2	3
6	(Hungary) Tímea Babos	4	6	6

Second round
1	(Romania) Alexandra Cadanțu	1	6	6
(Russia) Valeria Solovyeva	6	1	3
(France) Aravane Rezaï	2	4
6	(Hungary) Tímea Babos	6	6

Qualifying competition
1	(Romania) Alexandra Cadanțu	3	2
6	(Hungary) Tímea Babos	6	6

==== Second qualifier ====
First round
2	(Italy) Karin Knapp	6	6^{7}	6
(France) Séverine Beltrame	4	7^{9}	2
(Slovakia) Anna Karolína Schmiedlová	5	6	6
(Liechtenstein) Stephanie Vogt	7	3	3
(Italy) Maria Elena Camerin	2	4
(Slovenia) Tadeja Majerič	6	6
(Romania) Raluca Olaru	4	6	3
8	(France) Stéphanie Foretz-Gacon	6	2	6

Second round
2	(Italy) Karin Knapp	6	5	6
(Slovakia) Anna Karolína Schmiedlová	3	7	4
(Slovenia) Tadeja Majerič	6	6^{5}	4
8	(France) Stéphanie Foretz-Gacon	2	7^{7}	6

Qualifying competition
2	(Italy) Karin Knapp	6	6
8	(France) Stéphanie Foretz-Gacon	0	1

==== Third qualifier ====
First round
3	(Portugal) Maria João Koehler	6	6
WC	(Morocco) Nadia Lalami	1	4
(Slovakia) Michaela Hončová	6	6
(Russia) Daria Gavrilova	1	2
(Russia) Alla Kudryavtseva	6	6
(Spain) Arantxa Parra Santonja	4	2
(France) Alizé Lim	4	2
7	(Brazil) Teliana Pereira	6	6

Second round
3	(Portugal) Maria João Koehler	6	4	5
(Slovakia) Michaela Hončová	3	6	7
(Russia) Alla Kudryavtseva	6^{3}	4
7	(Brazil) Teliana Pereira	7^{7}	6

Qualifying competition
(Slovakia) Michaela Hončová	6	2	6
7	(Brazil) Teliana Pereira	4	6	3

==== Fourth qualifier ====
First round
4	(Russia) Nina Bratchikova	6	6
(France) Laura Thorpe	4	1
WC	(France) Chloé Paquet	3	2
(Romania) Cristina Dinu	6	6
WC	(Morocco) Zaineb El Houari	0	3
WC	(Morocco) Rita Atik	6	6
(Poland) Marta Domachowska	7	1	4
5	(Spain) Estrella Cabeza Candela	6^{1}	6	6

Second round
4	(Russia) Nina Bratchikova	6	6
(Romania) Cristina Dinu	0	2
WC	(Morocco) Rita Atik	2	0
5	(Spain) Estrella Cabeza Candela	6	6

Qualifying competition
4	(Russia) Nina Bratchikova	7	2	4
5	(Spain) Estrella Cabeza Candela	5	6	6
