= 2022 Bronx Open – Singles =

Singles
- 2022 Bronx Open

Final
- Champion: Kamilla Rakhimova
- Runner-up: (Sweden) Mirjam Björklund
- Score: 6–2, 6–3

Events
Singles	Doubles
← 2019 ·	Bronx Open	· 2023 →

Magda Linette was the defending champion but chose to compete at the 2022 Western & Southern Open instead.

Kamilla Rakhimova won the title, defeating Mirjam Björklund in the final, 6–2, 6–3.

== Seeds ==
1. (Australia) Daria Saville (first round)
2. (France) Océane Dodin (first round)
3. (Switzerland) Viktorija Golubic (second round)
4. (Germany) Jule Niemeier (first round)
5. Kamilla Rakhimova (champion)
6. Vitalia Diatchenko (first round)
7. (Italy) Sara Errani (first round)
8. (South Korea) Jang Su-jeong (second round)

== Draw ==
=== Key ===
- Q = Qualifier
- WC = Wild card
- LL = Lucky loser
- Alt = Alternate
- SE = Special exempt
- PR = Protected ranking
- ITF = ITF entry
- JE = Junior exempt
- w/o = Walkover
- r = Retired
- d = Defaulted
- SR = Special ranking

=== Finals ===
Semifinals
Erika Andreeva	2	2
5	Kamilla Rakhimova	6	6
(Sweden) Mirjam Björklund	6	6
(Switzerland) Simona Waltert	4	2

Final
5	Kamilla Rakhimova	6	6
(Sweden) Mirjam Björklund	2	3

=== Top half ===
First round
1	(Australia) D Saville	6	1	2
WC	(United States) L Chirico	4	6	6
Q	O Selekhmeteva	6	7
WC	(United States) A Krueger	2	5
(France) C Burel	1	0^{r}
E Andreeva	6	3
Q	A Blinkova	6	6
6	V Diatchenko	1	3
4	(Germany) J Niemeier	6	3	2
Q	(Netherlands) L Pattinama Kerkhove	0	6	6
(Germany) T Korpatsch	3	0
(Spain) C Bucșa	6	6
Q	(China) Y Yuan	2	4
(Japan) M Uchijima	6	6
Q	(Ukraine) K Baindl	2	0^{r}
5	K Rakhimova	6	2

Second round
WC	(United States) L Chirico	4	1
Q	O Selekhmeteva	6	6
E Andreeva	6	6
Q	A Blinkova	4	4
Q	(Netherlands) L Pattinama Kerkhove	6^{2}	1
(Spain) C Bucșa	7^{7}	6
(Japan) M Uchijima	0	1
5	K Rakhimova	6	6

Quarterfinals
Q	O Selekhmeteva	6^{3}	3
E Andreeva	7^{7}	6
(Spain) C Bucșa	6	6^{3}	2
5	K Rakhimova	4	7^{7}	6

Semifinals
E Andreeva	2	2
5	K Rakhimova	6	6

=== Bottom half ===
First round
7	(Italy) S Errani	4	3
Q	(Australia) K Birrell	6	6
Q	A Gasanova	6	6
WC	(United States) J Loeb	3	3
(Hungary) RL Jani	5	2
(Sweden) M Björklund	7	6
WC	(United States) S Vickery	6	6^{3}	5
3	(Switzerland) V Golubic	3	7^{7}	7
8	(South Korea) S-j Jang	6	6
Q	(Mexico) F Contreras Gómez	2	2
(Austria) J Grabher	0	5
(Ukraine) D Snigur	6	7
(Romania) I Bara	3	7^{7}	6
(Georgia (country)) E Gorgodze	6	6^{1}	4
(Switzerland) S Waltert	4	7^{7}	6
2	(France) O Dodin	6	6^{5}	2

Second round
Q	(Australia) K Birrell	2	5
Q	A Gasanova	6	7
(Sweden) M Björklund	7	6
3	(Switzerland) V Golubic	5	2
8	(South Korea) S-j Jang	6^{8}	6	4
(Ukraine) D Snigur	7^{10}	4	6
(Romania) I Bara	3	3
(Switzerland) S Waltert	6	6

Quarterfinals
Q	A Gasanova	5	0^{r}
(Sweden) M Björklund	7	0
(Ukraine) D Snigur	7	4	5
(Switzerland) S Waltert	5	6	7

Semifinals
(Sweden) M Björklund	6	6
(Switzerland) S Waltert	4	2
