= 2011 USTA Tennis Classic of Troy – Singles =

Singles
- 2011 USTA Tennis Classic of Troy

Final
- Champion: (Italy) Romina Oprandi
- Runner-up: (United States) Varvara Lepchenko
- Score: 6–1, 6–2

Events
Singles	Doubles
← 2010 ·	USTA Tennis Classic of Troy	· 2012 →

Rebecca Marino was the defending champion, but chose not to participate.
Romina Oprandi won the title, defeating Varvara Lepchenko in the final.

== Seeds ==
1. (Italy) Romina Oprandi (champion)
2. (United States) Varvara Lepchenko (final)
3. (Russia) Valeria Savinykh (first round)
4. (Italy) Camila Giorgi (first round)
5. (United States) Melanie Oudin (first round)
6. (Canada) Sharon Fichman (second round)
7. (Croatia) Ajla Tomljanović (first round)
8. (United States) Chichi Scholl (quarterfinals)

== Main draw ==
=== Key ===
- Q = Qualifier
- WC = Wild card
- LL = Lucky loser
- Alt = Alternate
- SE = Special exempt
- PR = Protected ranking
- ITF = ITF entry
- JE = Junior exempt
- w/o = Walkover
- r = Retired
- d = Defaulted
- SR = Special ranking

=== Finals ===
Semifinals
1	(Italy) Romina Oprandi	6	3	6
(Russia) Olga Puchkova	2	6	1
(Kazakhstan) Sesil Karatantcheva	4	4
2	(United States) Varvara Lepchenko	6	6

Final
1	(Italy) Romina Oprandi	6	6
2	(United States) Varvara Lepchenko	1	2

=== Top half ===
First round
1	(Italy) R Oprandi	7	7^{7}
(Brazil) R Vaisemberg	5	6^{1}
(Paraguay) V Cepede Royg	7^{7}	3
(Colombia) M Duque	6^{1}	1^{r}
Q	(Canada) M-È Pelletier	4	6^{5}
Q	(United States) S Rogers	6	7^{7}
(United States) M Brengle	1	2
6	(Canada) S Fichman	6	6
3	(Russia) V Savinykh	5	3
(United States) G Brodsky	7	6
(Russia) O Puchkova	6	4	6
WC	(United States) C-y Hsu	0	6	2
(United States) A Weinhold	3	3
(United States) A Stevenson	6	6
WC	(United States) R Foster	0	1
8	(United States) C Scholl	6	6

Second round
1	(Italy) R Oprandi	6	6
(Paraguay) V Cepede Royg	2	0
Q	(United States) S Rogers	3	6	6
6	(Canada) S Fichman	6	4	4
(United States) G Brodsky	3	5
(Russia) O Puchkova	6	7
(United States) A Stevenson	4	0^{r}
8	(United States) C Scholl	6	2

Quarterfinals
1	(Italy) R Oprandi	6	6
Q	(United States) S Rogers	4	3
(Russia) O Puchkova	3	6	6
8	(United States) C Scholl	6	2	3

Semifinals
1	(Italy) R Oprandi	6	3	6
(Russia) O Puchkova	2	6	1

=== Bottom half ===
First round
5/WC	(United States) M Oudin	1	3
(Kazakhstan) S Karatantcheva	6	6
LL	(United States) A King	7^{7}	6^{1}	7^{7}
(Slovenia) P Rampre	6^{3}	7^{7}	6^{4}
(Hungary) T Babos	6^{5}	6	5
(United States) A Rolle	7^{7}	4	7
Q	(United States) G Min	6	6
4	(Italy) C Giorgi	3	4
7	(Croatia) A Tomljanović	3	2
Q	(Russia) E Bovina	6	6
(United States) J Boserup	0	6^{3}
(France) A Lim	6	7^{7}
(Belgium) T Hendler	5	6	3
(Portugal) M Larcher de Brito	7	3	6
(Colombia) C Castaño	6^{4}	0
2	(United States) V Lepchenko	7^{7}	6

Second round
(Kazakhstan) S Karatantcheva	6	6
LL	(United States) A King	2	3
(United States) A Rolle	3	3
Q	(United States) G Min	6	6
Q	(Russia) E Bovina	3	6	6
(France) A Lim	6	0	4
(Portugal) M Larcher de Brito	4	6	6^{3}
2	(United States) V Lepchenko	6	4	7^{7}

Quarterfinals
(Kazakhstan) S Karatantcheva	6	6
Q	(United States) G Min	1	2
Q	(Russia) E Bovina	3	4
2	(United States) V Lepchenko	6	6

Semifinals
(Kazakhstan) S Karatantcheva	4	4
2	(United States) V Lepchenko	6	6
