= 2019 Bronx Open =

- Date: 18 – 24 August
- Edition: 18th
- Category: WTA International
- Draw: 30S / 16D
- Prize money: $250,000
- Surface: Hard court
- Location: New York City, United States
- Venue: Cary Leeds Center

Champions

Singles
- (Poland) Magda Linette

Doubles
- (Croatia) Darija Jurak / (Spain) María José Martínez Sánchez
← 2012 ·	Bronx Open	· 2022 →

The 2019 Bronx Open was a professional tennis tournament played on hard courts. It was the 18th edition of the Bronx Open, and first edition as part of the WTA International tournaments of the 2019 WTA Tour. It took place at the Cary Leeds Center in Crotona Park in The Bronx, New York City, United States from 18 to 24 August 2019.

This tournament replaced the Tournoi de Québec on the WTA Tour. The Connecticut Open, which was a WTA Premier event formerly scheduled for the week before the US Open, was replaced by the Zhengzhou Open.

== Points and prize money ==
=== Point distribution ===
Event	W	F	SF	QF	Round of 16	Round of 32	Q	Q3	Q2	Q1
Singles	280	180	110	60	30	1	18	14	10	1
Doubles	280	180	110	60	1	—	—	—	—	—

=== Prize money ===
Event	W	F	SF	QF	Round of 16	Round of 32	Q3	Q2	Q1
Singles	$43,000	$21,400	$11,300	$5,900	$3,310	$1,925	$1,005	$730	$530
Doubles	$12,300	$6,400	$3,435	$1,820	$960	—	—	—	

== Singles main draw entrants ==
=== Seeds ===
Country	Player	Rank^{1}	Seed
CHN	Wang Qiang	17	1
~~ESP~~	~~Carla Suárez Navarro~~	~~29~~	~~2~~
CZE	Barbora Strýcová	31	3
CHN	Zhang Shuai	34	4
CZE	Kateřina Siniaková	38	5
~~CHN~~	~~Zheng Saisai~~	~~39~~	~~6~~
KAZ	Yulia Putintseva	42	7
~~AUS~~	~~Ajla Tomljanović~~	~~46~~	~~8~~
BLR	Aliaksandra Sasnovich	47	9
CZE	Karolína Muchová	48	10

- Rankings as of August 12, 2019.

=== Other entrants ===
The following players received wildcards into the singles main draw:

- (United States) Kristie Ahn
- (United States) Bernarda Pera
- (United States) CoCo Vandeweghe

The following players received entry from the qualifying draw:

- (France) Fiona Ferro
- (Estonia) Kaia Kanepi
- (Poland) Magda Linette
- (Russia) Anastasia Potapova
- (Switzerland) Jil Teichmann
- (China) Zhu Lin

The following players received entry as lucky losers:

- (Russia) Anna Blinkova
- (Switzerland) Viktorija Golubic
- (Germany) Laura Siegemund

=== Withdrawals ===
- (United States) Danielle Collins → replaced by (Russia) Veronika Kudermetova
- (Germany) Anna-Lena Friedsam → replaced by (China) Wang Yafan
- (United Kingdom) Johanna Konta → replaced by (Czech Republic) Karolína Muchová
- (Estonia) Anett Kontaveit → replaced by (Russia) Margarita Gasparyan
- (Greece) Maria Sakkari → replaced by (Ukraine) Kateryna Kozlova
- (Spain) Carla Suárez Navarro → replaced by (Switzerland) Viktorija Golubic
- (Australia) Ajla Tomljanović → replaced by (Russia) Anna Blinkova
- (Ukraine) Dayana Yastremska → replaced by (Belgium) Alison Van Uytvanck
- (China) Zheng Saisai → replaced by (Germany) Laura Siegemund

=== Retirements ===
- (Russia) Anastasia Potapova (breathing difficulty)
- (China) Zhu Lin (left leg injury)

== Doubles main draw entrants ==
=== Seeds ===
Country	Player	Country	Player	Rank^{1}	Seed
AUS	Samantha Stosur	CHN	Zhang Shuai	23	1
TPE	Chan Hao-ching	TPE	Latisha Chan	31	2
CRO	Darija Jurak	ESP	María José Martínez Sánchez	69	3
USA	Desirae Krawczyk	POL	Alicja Rosolska	70	4

- ^{1} Rankings as of August 12, 2019

=== Other entrants ===
The following pairs received wildcards into the doubles main draw:

- (United States) Kristie Ahn / (United States) Vania King
- (Chinese Taipei) Hsieh Su-wei / (Chinese Taipei) Hsieh Yu-chieh

== Champions ==
=== Singles ===
- (Poland) Magda Linette def. (Italy) Camila Giorgi, 5–7, 7–5, 6–4

=== Doubles ===
- (Croatia) Darija Jurak / (Spain) María José Martínez Sánchez def. (Russia) Margarita Gasparyan / (Romania) Monica Niculescu, 7–5, 2–6, [10–7]
