= 2022 Bronx Open =

Tennis tournament

- Date: 15–21 August 2022
- Edition: 19th
- Category: ITF Women's World Tennis Tour
- Prize money: $60,000
- Surface: Hard / Outdoor
- Location: The Bronx, United States

Champions

Singles
- Kamilla Rakhimova

Doubles
- Anna Blinkova / (Switzerland) Simona Waltert
← 2019 ·	Bronx Open	· 2023 →

The 2022 NYJTL Bronx Open was a professional tennis tournament played on outdoor hard courts. It was the nineteenth edition of the tournament which was part of the 2022 ITF Women's World Tennis Tour. It took place in The Bronx, United States between 15 and 21 August 2022.

== Champions ==
=== Singles ===
- Kamilla Rakhimova def. (Sweden) Mirjam Björklund, 6–2, 6–3

=== Doubles ===
- Anna Blinkova / (Switzerland) Simona Waltert def. (South Korea) Han Na-lae / (Japan) Hiroko Kuwata, 6–3, 6–3

== Singles main draw entrants ==
=== Seeds ===
Country	Player	Rank^{1}	Seed
AUS	Daria Saville	73	1
FRA	Océane Dodin	87	2
SUI	Viktorija Golubic	91	3
GER	Jule Niemeier	102	4
	Kamilla Rakhimova	106	5
	Vitalia Diatchenko	114	6
ITA	Sara Errani	117	7
KOR	Jang Su-jeong	121	8

- ^{1} Rankings are as of 8 August 2022.

=== Other entrants ===
The following players received wildcards into the singles main draw:

- (United States) Louisa Chirico
- (United States) Ashlyn Krueger
- (United States) Jamie Loeb
- (United States) Sachia Vickery

The following players received entry from the qualifying draw:

- (Ukraine) Kateryna Baindl
- (Australia) Kimberly Birrell
- Anna Blinkova
- (Mexico) Fernanda Contreras Gómez
- Anastasia Gasanova
- (Netherlands) Lesley Pattinama Kerkhove
- Oksana Selekhmeteva
- (China) Yuan Yue
