= 2019 Bronx Open – Singles =

Singles
- 2019 Bronx Open

Final
- Champion: (Poland) Magda Linette
- Runner-up: (Italy) Camila Giorgi
- Score: 5–7, 7–5, 6–4

Events
Singles	Doubles
- Bronx Open

Romina Oprandi was the defending champion, having won the last edition in 2012 as an ITF tournament, but chose not to participate.

Magda Linette won her first WTA Tour title, defeating Camila Giorgi in the final, 5–7, 7–5, 6–4.

== Seeds ==
The top two seeds to participate received a bye into the second round.

1. (China) Wang Qiang (semifinals)
2. (Spain) Carla Suárez Navarro (withdrew)
3. (Czech Republic) Barbora Strýcová (second round)
4. (China) Zhang Shuai (first round)
5. (Czech Republic) Kateřina Siniaková (semifinals)
6. (China) Zheng Saisai (withdrew)
7. (Kazakhstan) Yulia Putintseva (first round)
8. (Australia) Ajla Tomljanović (withdrew)
9. (Belarus) Aliaksandra Sasnovich (second round)
10. (Czech Republic) Karolína Muchová (quarterfinals)

== Draw ==
Key

- Q = Qualifier
- WC = Wild card
- LL = Lucky loser
- Alt = Alternate
- ITF = ITF entry
- PR = Protected ranking
- SR = Special ranking
- SE = Special exempt
- JE = Junior exempt
- JR = Junior Accelerator Programme entrant
- CO = College Accelerator Programme entrant
- NG = Next Gen Accelerator Program entrant
- w/o = Walkover
- r = Retired
- d = Defaulted

=== Finals ===
Semifinals
1	(China) Wang Qiang	6	4	6^{6}
(Italy) Camila Giorgi	4	6	7^{8}
Q	(Poland) Magda Linette	7^{7}	6
5	(Czech Republic) Kateřina Siniaková	6^{3}	2

Final
(Italy) Camila Giorgi	7	5	4
Q	(Poland) Magda Linette	5	7	6

=== Top half ===
First round
Q	(France) F Ferro	6	6
LL	(Switzerland) V Golubic	0	1
LL	(Germany) L Siegemund	6	0	4
(Romania) M Buzărnescu	3	6	6
WC	(United States) C Vandeweghe	3	0
LL	(Russia) A Blinkova	6	6
4	(China) S Zhang	3	4
(Germany) A Petkovic	6	6
(Italy) C Giorgi	6	6
(Russia) M Gasparyan	3	2
(Ukraine) K Kozlova	4	2
(France) A Cornet	6	6
Q	(China) L Zhu	7^{7}	6
7	(Kazakhstan) Y Putintseva	6^{2}	4

Second round
1	(China) Q Wang	6	6
Q	(France) F Ferro	1	4
(Romania) M Buzărnescu	6	3	3
LL	(Russia) A Blinkova	1	6	6
(Germany) A Petkovic	6	5	6^{3}
(Italy) C Giorgi	3	7	7^{7}
(France) A Cornet	7^{7}	4
Q	(China) L Zhu	6^{5}	0^{r}

Quarterfinals
1	(China) Q Wang	0	6	6
LL	(Russia) A Blinkova	6	1	4
(Italy) C Giorgi	6	6
(France) A Cornet	2	1

Semifinals
1	(China) Q Wang	6	4	6^{6}
(Italy) C Giorgi	4	6	7^{8}

=== Bottom half ===
First round
10	(Czech Republic) K Muchová	7	6
(Slovakia) V Kužmová	5	2
WC	(United States) K Ahn	6	6
Q	(Switzerland) J Teichmann	3	4
Q	(Poland) M Linette	6	7
Q	(Estonia) K Kanepi	2	5
(Slovenia) P Hercog	3	2
9	(Belarus) A Sasnovich	6	6
5	(Czech Republic) K Siniaková	6	6
(China) Y Wang	3	2
(Belgium) A Van Uytvanck	6	4	2
Q	(Russia) A Potapova	4	6	6
(Russia) V Kudermetova	0	2
WC	(United States) B Pera	6	6

Second round
10	(Czech Republic) K Muchová	6	6
WC	(United States) K Ahn	3	1
Q	(Poland) M Linette	6	6
9	(Belarus) A Sasnovich	1	4
5	(Czech Republic) K Siniaková	6	3
Q	(Russia) A Potapova	0	0^{r}
WC	(United States) B Pera	3	6	6
3	(Czech Republic) B Strýcová	6	2	1

Quarterfinals
10	(Czech Republic) K Muchová	7^{7}	4	6^{3}
Q	(Poland) M Linette	6^{4}	6	7^{7}
5	(Czech Republic) K Siniaková	4	7^{8}	6
WC	(United States) B Pera	6	6^{6}	3

Semifinals
Q	(Poland) M Linette	7^{7}	6
5	(Czech Republic) K Siniaková	6^{3}	2

== Qualifying ==
=== Seeds ===
1. (Switzerland) Jil Teichmann (qualified)
2. (France) Fiona Ferro (qualified)
3. (Switzerland) Viktorija Golubic (qualifying competition, lucky loser)
4. (Russia) Anastasia Potapova (qualified)
5. (Estonia) Kaia Kanepi (qualified)
6. (Poland) Magda Linette (qualified)
7. (Kazakhstan) Zarina Diyas (withdrew)
8. (France) Pauline Parmentier (second round)
9. (Czech Republic) Kristýna Plíšková (withdrew, still competing in Cincinnati)
10. (Germany) Laura Siegemund (qualifying competition, lucky loser)
11. (Russia) Anna Blinkova (qualifying competition, lucky loser)
12. (Russia) Natalia Vikhlyantseva (second round)

=== Qualifiers ===
1. (Switzerland) Jil Teichmann
2. (France) Fiona Ferro
3. (China) Zhu Lin
4. (Russia) Anastasia Potapova
5. (Estonia) Kaia Kanepi
6. (Poland) Magda Linette

=== Lucky losers ===
1. (Switzerland) Viktorija Golubic
2. (Germany) Laura Siegemund
3. (Russia) Anna Blinkova

=== Draw ===
==== First qualifier ====
First round
1	(Switzerland) Jil Teichmann	6	6
(Japan) Hiroko Kuwata	2	1
(Australia) Belinda Woolcock	6	7^{7}
(Russia) Nika Kukharchuk	4	6^{1}
(United States) Claire Liu	7	7
(Serbia) Aleksandra Krunić	5	5
(United States) Natasha Subhash	0	2
10	(Germany) Laura Siegemund	6	6

Second round
1	(Switzerland) Jil Teichmann	6	6
(Australia) Belinda Woolcock	3	4
(United States) Claire Liu	4	1
10	(Germany) Laura Siegemund	6	6

Qualifying competition
1	(Switzerland) Jil Teichmann	0	7^{9}	7^{7}
10	(Germany) Laura Siegemund	6	6^{7}	6^{5}

==== Second qualifier ====
First round
2	(France) Fiona Ferro	6	6
(United States) Grace Min	2	4
(Croatia) Jana Fett	6	6
(Czech Republic) Renata Voráčová	3	3
(United States) Elizabeth Mandlik	6	6
(United States) Jennifer Elie	4	4
(China) Duan Yingying	6	6
WC	(Georgia (country)) Oksana Kalashnikova	2	1

Second round
2	(France) Fiona Ferro	6	6
(Croatia) Jana Fett	4	0
(United States) Elizabeth Mandlik	6	0	6
(China) Duan Yingying	3	6	2

Qualifying competition
2	(France) Fiona Ferro	4	6	6
(United States) Elizabeth Mandlik	6	4	3

==== Third qualifier ====
First round
3	(Switzerland) Viktorija Golubic	6	6
(Belarus) Lidziya Marozava	3	1
(Australia) Astra Sharma	3	6	6
(Spain) Aliona Bolsova	6	1	1
(China) Zhu Lin	6	6
WC	(United States) Alexa Noel	4	2
(Australia) Samantha Stosur	2	3
8	(France) Pauline Parmentier	6	6

Second round
3	(Switzerland) Viktorija Golubic	2	6	6
(Australia) Astra Sharma	6	4	3
(China) Zhu Lin	6	6
8	(France) Pauline Parmentier	1	2

Qualifying competition
3	(Switzerland) Viktorija Golubic	6	1	5
(China) Zhu Lin	3	6	7

==== Fourth qualifier ====
First round
4	(Russia) Anastasia Potapova	6	6
(Ukraine) Lyudmyla Kichenok	0	1
(Japan) Junri Namigata	6	2	6^{2}
(China) Yang Zhaoxuan	4	6	7^{7}
(United States) Francesca Di Lorenzo	w/o
7	(Kazakhstan) Zarina Diyas

Second round
4	(Russia) Anastasia Potapova	3	6	6
(China) Yang Zhaoxuan	6	3	3
(United States) Whitney Osuigwe	4	6	0^{r}
(United States) Francesca Di Lorenzo	6	3	2

Qualifying competition
4	(Russia) Anastasia Potapova	6	4	6
(United States) Francesca Di Lorenzo	4	6	2

==== Fifth qualifier ====
First round
5	(Estonia) Kaia Kanepi	6	3	6
(Canada) Eugenie Bouchard	4	6	3
(Japan) Mayo Hibi	6	2
(China) You Xiaodi	1	0^{r}
WC	(United States) Elysia Bolton	6^{4}	6^{3}
(Ukraine) Nadiia Kichenok	7^{7}	7^{7}
(Japan) Shuko Aoyama	5	4
12	(Russia) Natalia Vikhlyantseva	7	6

Second round
5	(Estonia) Kaia Kanepi	6	6
(Japan) Mayo Hibi	3	4
(Ukraine) Nadiia Kichenok	6	1	6
12	(Russia) Natalia Vikhlyantseva	4	6	4

Qualifying competition
5	(Estonia) Kaia Kanepi	6^{3}	6	6
(Ukraine) Nadiia Kichenok	7^{7}	1	2

==== Sixth qualifier ====
First round
6	(Poland) Magda Linette	6	6
(Canada) Gabriela Dabrowski	1	2
(United States) Sophie Chang	6	6
WC	(Kazakhstan) Galina Voskoboeva	4	2
(United States) Maria Sanchez	6	6
(Hungary) Panna Udvardy	4	2
(United Kingdom) Emily Webley-Smith	2	0
11	(Russia) Anna Blinkova	6	6

Second round
6	(Poland) Magda Linette	6	6
(United States) Sophie Chang	3	3
(United States) Maria Sanchez	2	4
11	(Russia) Anna Blinkova	6	6

Qualifying competition
6	(Poland) Magda Linette	7^{8}	7^{11}
11	(Russia) Anna Blinkova	6^{6}	6^{9}
