= 2013 Grand Prix SAR La Princesse Lalla Meryem – Doubles =

Doubles
- 2013 Grand Prix SAR La Princesse Lalla Meryem

Final
- Champions: (Hungary) Tímea Babos (Luxembourg) Mandy Minella
- Runners-up: (Croatia) Petra Martić (France) Kristina Mladenovic
- Score: 6–3, 6–1

Events
Singles	Doubles
← 2012 ·	Grand Prix SAR La Princesse Lalla Meryem	· 2014 →

Petra Cetkovská and Alexandra Panova were the defending champions but decided not to participate.
Tímea Babos and Mandy Minella won the title, defeating Petra Martić and Kristina Mladenovic in the final, 6–3, 6–1.

== Seeds ==
1. (Slovakia) Daniela Hantuchová / (Spain) Anabel Medina Garrigues (quarterfinals)
2. (Italy) Flavia Pennetta / (Italy) Francesca Schiavone (first round)
3. (Hungary) Tímea Babos / (Luxembourg) Mandy Minella (champions)
4. (Croatia) Petra Martić / (France) Kristina Mladenovic (final)

== Draw ==
=== Key ===
- Q = Qualifier
- WC = Wild card
- LL = Lucky loser
- Alt = Alternate
- SE = Special exempt
- PR = Protected ranking
- ITF = ITF entry
- JE = Junior exempt
- w/o = Walkover
- r = Retired
- d = Defaulted
- SR = Special ranking

=== Draw ===
First round
1	(Slovakia) D Hantuchová (Spain) A Medina Garrigues	6	6
(Canada) G Dabrowski (Russia) A Kudryavtseva	3	2
(Russia) V Savinykh (Russia) V Solovyeva	6	6^{6}	[2]
(Ukraine) O Savchuk (South Africa) C Scheepers	2	7	[10]
4	(Croatia) P Martić (France) K Mladenovic	6	6
(France) S Beltrame (France) L Thorpe	2	1
(Austria) S Klemenschits (Slovenia) A Klepač	6	6
WC	(France) A Lim (Morocco) L Qostal	3	3
(Czech Republic) E Hrdinová (Czech Republic) Ka Plíšková	6	6
(Russia) N Bratchikova (Romania) A Cadanțu	3	3
(Poland) M Domachowska (France) S Foretz-Gacon	6	4	[10]
3	(Hungary) T Babos (Luxembourg) M Minella	3	6	[12]
WC	(Morocco) FZ El Allami (Morocco) N Lalami	0	4
(Spain) L Domínguez Lino (Spain) A Parra Santonja	6	6
(Poland) P Kania (Romania) R Olaru	4	6	[10]
2	(Italy) F Pennetta (Italy) F Schiavone	6	4	[8]

Quarterfinals
1	(Slovakia) D Hantuchová (Spain) A Medina Garrigues	4	3
(Ukraine) O Savchuk (South Africa) C Scheepers	6	6
4	(Croatia) P Martić (France) K Mladenovic	4	6	[10]
(Austria) S Klemenschits (Slovenia) A Klepač	6	3	[8]
(Czech Republic) E Hrdinová (Czech Republic) Ka Plíšková	6	6^{1}	[8]
3	(Hungary) T Babos (Luxembourg) M Minella	3	7^{7}	[10]
(Spain) L Domínguez Lino (Spain) A Parra Santonja	6	7^{7}
(Poland) P Kania (Romania) R Olaru	4	6^{5}

Semifinals
(Ukraine) O Savchuk (South Africa) C Scheepers	4	0
4	(Croatia) P Martić (France) K Mladenovic	6	6
3	(Hungary) T Babos (Luxembourg) M Minella	3	7^{8}	[10]
(Spain) L Domínguez Lino (Spain) A Parra Santonja	6	6^{6}	[8]

Final
4	(Croatia) P Martić (France) K Mladenovic	3	1
3	(Hungary) T Babos (Luxembourg) M Minella	6	6
