= 2012 EmblemHealth Bronx Open – Doubles =

Doubles
- 2012 EmblemHealth Bronx Open

Final
- Champions: (Japan) Shuko Aoyama (Japan) Erika Sema
- Runners-up: (Japan) Eri Hozumi (Japan) Miki Miyamura
- Score: 6–4, 7–6^{(7–4)}

Events
Singles	Doubles
- EmblemHealth Bronx Open

Megan Moulton-Levy and Ahsha Rolle were the defending champions, but both players chose not to participate.

Shuko Aoyama and Erika Sema won the title defeating Eri Hozumi and Miki Miyamura in the final 6–4, 7–6^{(7–4)}.

== Seeds ==
1. (Czech Republic) Karolína Plíšková / (Czech Republic) Kristýna Plíšková (quarterfinals, withdrew)
2. (Japan) Shuko Aoyama / (Japan) Erika Sema (champions)
3. (Germany) Tatjana Malek / (France) Irena Pavlovic (quarterfinals)
4. (Serbia) Vesna Dolonc / (Russia) Olga Puchkova (quarterfinals)

== Draw ==
Key

- Q = Qualifier
- WC = Wild card
- LL = Lucky loser
- Alt = Alternate
- ITF = ITF entry
- PR = Protected ranking
- SR = Special ranking
- SE = Special exempt
- JE = Junior exempt
- JR = Junior Accelerator Programme entrant
- CO = College Accelerator Programme entrant
- NG = Next Gen Accelerator Program entrant
- w/o = Walkover
- r = Retired
- d = Defaulted

=== Draw ===
First round
1	(Czech Republic) Ka Plíšková (Czech Republic) Kr Plíšková	6	3	[10]
(Czech Republic) T Hladíková (United States) C Scholl	3	6	[4]
(Venezuela) G Paz (Brazil) T Pereira
(United States) L Litvak (Venezuela) A Pérez	w/o
4	(Serbia) V Dolonc (Russia) O Puchkova	3	6	[10]
SR	(Russia) A Chakvetadze (Argentina) P Ormaechea	6	0	[7]
(Japan) E Hozumi (Japan) M Miyamura	2	6	[10]
(United States) C-Y Hsu (United Kingdom) J Konta	6	4	[3]
WC	(United States) M Harkins (United States) ZG Scandalis	6	6
(United Kingdom) N Broady (United Kingdom) E Webley-Smith	4	1
Alt	(United States) A Rodriguez (Mexico) V Salazar	1	2
3	(Germany) T Malek (France) I Pavlovic	6	6
WC	(United States) K Ahn (United States) J Cako	6	7^{7}
WC	(United States) V Corning (United States) J Elbaba	4	6^{5}
(United States) A Riske (United States) A Will	3	2
2	(Japan) S Aoyama (Japan) E Sema	6	6

Quarterfinals
1	(Czech Republic) Ka Plíšková (Czech Republic) Kr Plíšková
(United States) L Litvak (Venezuela) A Pérez	w/o
4	(Serbia) V Dolonc (Russia) O Puchkova	5	2
(Japan) E Hozumi (Japan) M Miyamura	7	6
WC	(United States) M Harkins (United States) ZG Scandalis	6	6
3	(Germany) T Malek (France) I Pavlovic	2	2
WC	(United States) K Ahn (United States) J Cako	2	2
2	(Japan) S Aoyama (Japan) E Sema	6	6

Semifinals
(United States) L Litvak (Venezuela) A Pérez	4	4
(Japan) E Hozumi (Japan) M Miyamura	6	6
WC	(United States) M Harkins (United States) ZG Scandalis
2	(Japan) S Aoyama (Japan) E Sema	w/o

Finals
(Japan) E Hozumi (Japan) M Miyamura	4	6^{4}
2	(Japan) S Aoyama (Japan) E Sema	6	7^{7}
