= 2022 Bronx Open – Doubles =

Doubles
- 2022 Bronx Open

Final
- Champions: Anna Blinkova (Switzerland) Simona Waltert
- Runners-up: (South Korea) Han Na-lae (Japan) Hiroko Kuwata
- Score: 6–3, 6–3

Events
Singles	Doubles
← 2019 ·	Bronx Open	· 2023 →

Darija Jurak and María José Martínez Sánchez were the defending champions but Martínez Sánchez retired from professional tennis in 2020, whilst Jurak chose not to participate.

Anna Blinkova and Simona Waltert won the title, defeating Han Na-lae and Hiroko Kuwata in the final, 6–3, 6–3.

== Seeds ==
1. (Romania) Irina Bara / (Georgia (country)) Ekaterine Gorgodze (first round)
2. Lidziya Marozava / Kamilla Rakhimova (quarterfinals)
3. (Brazil) Carolina Alves / Anastasia Tikhonova (quarterfinals)
4. (Chinese Taipei) Hsieh Yu-chieh / (Japan) Moyuka Uchijima (quarterfinals)

== Draw ==
=== Key ===
- Q = Qualifier
- WC = Wild card
- LL = Lucky loser
- Alt = Alternate
- SE = Special exempt
- PR = Protected ranking
- ITF = ITF entry
- JE = Junior exempt
- w/o = Walkover
- r = Retired
- d = Defaulted
- SR = Special ranking

=== Draw ===
First round
1	(Romania) I Bara (Georgia (country)) E Gorgodze	6	5	[4]
(Belgium) Y Bonaventure (Netherlands) L Pattinama Kerkhove	2	7	[10]
(United States) A Zamarripa (United States) M Zamarripa	3	4
E Andreeva (China) Y Yuan	6	6
4	(Chinese Taipei) Y-c Hsieh (Japan) M Uchijima	7^{7}	6
(United States) E Bolton (United States) A Rogers	6^{4}	2
WC	(United States) J Hart (United States) R McAdoo	5	4
(South Korea) N-l Han (Japan) H Kuwata	7	6
A Blinkova (Switzerland) S Waltert	7	7^{7}
WC	(United States) H Baptiste (United States) W Osuigwe	5	6^{5}
(Hungary) RL Jani (Germany) T Korpatsch	5	6	[4]
3	(Brazil) C Alves; A Tikhonova	7	4	[10]
A Gasanova; O Selekhmeteva	6	6
(Ukraine) K Baindl (Slovakia) V Kužmová	1	4
WC	(United States) A Anazagasty-Pursoo (United States) KB Moore	2	2
2	L Marozava; K Rakhimova	6	6

Quarterfinals
(Belgium) Y Bonaventure (Netherlands) L Pattinama Kerkhove	6	7^{7}
E Andreeva (China) Y Yuan	2	6^{4}
4	(Chinese Taipei) Y-c Hsieh (Japan) M Uchijima	6	2	[8]
(South Korea) N-l Han (Japan) H Kuwata	2	6	[10]
A Blinkova (Switzerland) S Waltert	6	6
3	(Brazil) C Alves; A Tikhonova	4	0
A Gasanova; O Selekhmeteva	6	6
2	L Marozava; K Rakhimova	4	3

Semifinals
(Belgium) Y Bonaventure (Netherlands) L Pattinama Kerkhove	6	3	[9]
(South Korea) N-l Han (Japan) H Kuwata	3	6	[11]
A Blinkova (Switzerland) S Waltert	6	6
A Gasanova; O Selekhmeteva	3	3

Final
(South Korea) N-l Han (Japan) H Kuwata	3	3
A Blinkova (Switzerland) S Waltert	6	6
