= 2014 Grand Prix SAR La Princesse Lalla Meryem – Singles =

Singles
- 2014 Grand Prix SAR La Princesse Lalla Meryem

Final
- Champion: (Spain) María Teresa Torró Flor
- Runner-up: (Switzerland) Romina Oprandi
- Score: 6–3, 3–6, 6–3

Events
| Singles | Doubles |
- Grand Prix SAR La Princesse Lalla Meryem

Francesca Schiavone was the defending champion, but lost in the first round to Beatriz García Vidagany.

María Teresa Torró Flor won the tournament, defeating Romina Oprandi in the final, 6–3, 3–6, 6–3. In doing so, Torró Flor won her first WTA Tour singles title.

== Seeds ==
1. (Slovakia) Daniela Hantuchová (semifinals)
2. (Ukraine) Elina Svitolina (first round)
3. (Austria) Yvonne Meusburger (quarterfinals)
4. (Serbia) Bojana Jovanovski (first round)
5. (Spain) Garbiñe Muguruza (semifinals)
6. (China) Peng Shuai (quarterfinals; withdrew)
7. (China) Zhang Shuai (first round)
8. (Italy) Francesca Schiavone (first round)

== Draw ==
Key

- Q = Qualifier
- WC = Wild card
- LL = Lucky loser
- Alt = Alternate
- ITF = ITF entry
- PR = Protected ranking
- SR = Special ranking
- SE = Special exempt
- JE = Junior exempt
- JR = Junior Accelerator Programme entrant
- CO = College Accelerator Programme entrant
- NG = Next Gen Accelerator Program entrant
- w/o = Walkover
- r = Retired
- d = Defaulted

=== Finals ===
Semifinals
1/WC | (Slovakia) Daniela Hantuchová | 5 | 6 | 3
(Switzerland) Romina Oprandi | 7 | 3 | 6
(Spain) María Teresa Torró Flor | 6 | 6
5 | (Spain) Garbiñe Muguruza | 0 | 3

Final
(Switzerland) Romina Oprandi | 3 | 6 | 3
(Spain) María Teresa Torró Flor | 6 | 3 | 6

=== Top half ===
First round
1/WC | (Slovakia) D Hantuchová | 3 | 6 | 7
Q | (Czech Republic) R Voráčová | 6 | 2 | 5
(Spain) L Domínguez Lino | 6 | 7
(Russia) A Kudryavtseva | 2 | 5
Q | (Ukraine) M Zanevska | 6 | 6
WC | (Morocco) R Atik | 2 | 0
WC | (Tunisia) O Jabeur | 4 | 6 | 1
6 | (China) S Peng | 6 | 2 | 6
3 | (Austria) Y Meusburger | 6 | 6
(Czech Republic) P Cetkovská | 3 | 3
(South Africa) C Scheepers | 3 | 6^{2}
(Spain) E Cabeza Candela | 6 | 7^{7}
LL | (Italy) A Grymalska | 7 | 1 | 4
(Switzerland) R Oprandi | 5 | 6 | 6
Q | (Spain) B García Vidagany | 6 | 6
8 | (Italy) F Schiavone | 3 | 2

Second round
1/WC | (Slovakia) D Hantuchová | 7 | 6
(Spain) L Domínguez Lino | 5 | 2
Q | (Ukraine) M Zanevska | 4 | 6^{5}
6 | (China) S Peng | 6 | 7^{7}
3 | (Austria) Y Meusburger | 6 | 6
(Spain) E Cabeza Candela | 0 | 2
(Switzerland) R Oprandi | 6 | 5 | 6
Q | (Spain) B García Vidagany | 2 | 7 | 2

Quarterfinals
1/WC | (Slovakia) D Hantuchová | w/o
6 | (China) S Peng
3 | (Austria) Y Meusburger | 4 | 4
(Switzerland) R Oprandi | 6 | 6

Semifinals
1/WC | (Slovakia) D Hantuchová | 5 | 6 | 3
(Switzerland) R Oprandi | 7 | 3 | 6

=== Bottom half ===
First round
7 | (China) S Zhang | 2 | 2
(Slovenia) P Hercog | 6 | 6
(Romania) A Cadanțu | 4 | 1
(Belgium) A Van Uytvanck | 6 | 6
(Poland) U Radwańska | 1 | 3
Q | (Spain) L Arruabarrena | 6 | 6
(Spain) MT Torró Flor | 6 | 6
4 | (Serbia) B Jovanovski | 2 | 2
5 | (Spain) G Muguruza | 6 | 6
(Israel) J Glushko | 2 | 2
(Spain) S Soler Espinosa | 3 | 2
(Switzerland) S Vögele | 6 | 6
(Croatia) P Martić | 2 | 3
(Israel) S Pe'er | 6 | 6
(Austria) P Mayr-Achleitner | 7^{7} | 3 | 6
2 | (Ukraine) E Svitolina | 6^{2} | 6 | 2

Second round
(Slovenia) P Hercog | 6 | 6
(Belgium) A Van Uytvanck | 1 | 4
Q | (Spain) L Arruabarrena | 1 | 2
(Spain) MT Torró Flor | 6 | 6
5 | (Spain) G Muguruza | 6 | 6
(Switzerland) S Vögele | 3 | 2
(Israel) S Pe'er | 7^{7} | 4 | 7^{7}
(Austria) P Mayr-Achleitner | 6^{4} | 6 | 6^{3}

Quarterfinals
(Slovenia) P Hercog | 6^{3} | 6^{5}
(Spain) MT Torró Flor | 7^{7} | 7^{7}
5 | (Spain) G Muguruza | 6 | 6
(Israel) S Pe'er | 3 | 1

Semifinals
(Spain) MT Torró Flor | 6 | 6
5 | (Spain) G Muguruza | 0 | 3

== Qualifying ==
=== Seeds ===
1. (United States) CoCo Vandeweghe (first round; retired)
2. (Poland) Katarzyna Piter (second round)
3. (Ukraine) Maryna Zanevska (qualified)
4. (France) Mathilde Johansson (first round)
5. (Spain) Lara Arruabarrena (qualified)
6. (France) Pauline Parmentier (first round)
7. (Czech Republic) Renata Voráčová (qualified)
8. (Italy) Alberta Brianti (first round)

=== Qualifiers ===
1. (Spain) Lara Arruabarrena
2. (Spain) Beatriz García Vidagany
3. (Ukraine) Maryna Zanevska
4. (Czech Republic) Renata Voráčová

=== Lucky loser ===
1. (Italy) Anastasia Grymalska

=== Draw ===
==== First qualifier ====
First round
1 | (United States) CoCo Vandeweghe | 1^{r}
(France) Myrtille Georges | 4
(Spain) Inés Ferrer Suárez | 4 | 1
(France) Constance Sibille | 6 | 6
(France) Stéphanie Foretz Gacon | 6 | 7
(Russia) Marina Shamayko | 4 | 5
(Russia) Marina Melnikova | 6 | 2 | 1
5 | (Spain) Lara Arruabarrena | 4 | 6 | 6

Second round
(France) Myrtille Georges | 4 | 3
(France) Constance Sibille | 6 | 6
(France) Stéphanie Foretz Gacon | 4 | 0
5 | (Spain) Lara Arruabarrena | 6 | 6

Qualifying competition
(France) Constance Sibille | 2 | 3
5 | (Spain) Lara Arruabarrena | 6 | 6

==== Second qualifier ====
First round
2 | (Poland) Katarzyna Piter | 6 | 6
(France) Irina Ramialison | 3 | 0
WC | (Morocco) Lina Qostal | 2 | 1
(Italy) Anastasia Grymalska | 6 | 6
WC | (Morocco) Zaineb El Houari | 1 | 0
(Poland) Sandra Zaniewska | 6 | 6
(Spain) Beatriz García Vidagany | 6 | 6
6 | (France) Pauline Parmentier | 4 | 1

Second round
2 | (Poland) Katarzyna Piter | 7 | 6^{3} | 0
(Italy) Anastasia Grymalska | 5 | 7^{7} | 6
(Poland) Sandra Zaniewska | 1 | 4
(Spain) Beatriz García Vidagany | 6 | 6

Qualifying competition
(Italy) Anastasia Grymalska | 1 | 3
(Spain) Beatriz García Vidagany | 6 | 6

==== Third qualifier ====
First round
3 | (Ukraine) Maryna Zanevska | 5 | 6 | 6
(Czech Republic) Tereza Martincová | 7 | 4 | 0
(Spain) Laura Pous Tió | 3 | 2
(Russia) Margarita Gasparyan | 6 | 6
(Switzerland) Conny Perrin | 2 | 3
(Chile) Daniela Seguel | 6 | 6
(Spain) Arantxa Parra Santonja | 6 | 6
8 | (Italy) Alberta Brianti | 2 | 0

Second round
3 | (Ukraine) Maryna Zanevska | 6 | 6
(Russia) Margarita Gasparyan | 3 | 4
(Chile) Daniela Seguel | 6 | 6
(Spain) Arantxa Parra Santonja | 4 | 4

Qualifying competition
3 | (Ukraine) Maryna Zanevska | 6 | 6
(Chile) Daniela Seguel | 1 | 4

==== Fourth qualifier ====
First round
4 | (France) Mathilde Johansson | 3 | 6 | 2
(Belgium) Ysaline Bonaventure | 6 | 4 | 6
(Portugal) Maria João Koehler | 6 | 6
WC | (Morocco) Ghita Benhadi | 3 | 0
(Netherlands) Lesley Kerkhove | 2 | 6 | 1
(Italy) Gaia Sanesi | 6 | 2 | 6
WC | (Madagascar) Zarah Razafimahatratra | 0 | 2
7 | (Czech Republic) Renata Voráčová | 6 | 6

Second round
(Belgium) Ysaline Bonaventure | 6 | 2 | 6
(Portugal) Maria João Koehler | 4 | 6 | 3
(Italy) Gaia Sanesi | 1 | 2
7 | (Czech Republic) Renata Voráčová | 6 | 6

Qualifying competition
(Belgium) Ysaline Bonaventure | 1 | 4
7 | (Czech Republic) Renata Voráčová | 6 | 6
