= USTA Tennis Classic of Troy =

Defunct tennis tournament
- Event name: USTA Tennis Classic of Troy
- Location: Troy, Alabama, United States
- Venue: Lunsford Tennis Complex
- Category: ITF Women's Circuit
- Surface: Hard
- Draw: 32S/32Q/16D
- Prize money: $50,000
- Website: troyusta.com

The USTA Tennis Classic of Troy was a tournament for professional female tennis players played on outdoor hardcourts. The event was classified as a $25,000 ITF Women's Circuit tournament. It was held annually in Troy, Alabama, United States from 2003 to 2012. The tournament was a $50,000 tournament until its last edition in 2012 where it was downgraded to $25,000.

== Past finals ==
=== Singles ===
Year	Champion	Runner-up	Score
2012	(Canada) Stéphanie Dubois	(Canada) Sharon Fichman	3–6, 6–4, 6–3
2011	(Italy) Romina Oprandi	(United States) Varvara Lepchenko	6–1, 6–2
2010	(Canada) Rebecca Marino	(United States) Ashley Weinhold	6–1, 6–2
2009	(United States) Alison Riske	(United States) Christina McHale	6–4, 2–6, 7–5
2008	(Georgia (country)) Anna Tatishvili	(United Kingdom) Georgie Stoop	7–6^{(7–4)}, 6–4
2007	(Estonia) Maret Ani	(Canada) Stéphanie Dubois	3–6, 6–4, 6–2
2006	(Venezuela) Milagros Sequera	(United States) Ahsha Rolle	7–5, 6–0
2005	(United States) Ahsha Rolle	(Russia) Maria Kondratieva	6–1, 7–5
2004	(United States) Shenay Perry	(Argentina) María Emilia Salerni	6–2, 6–2
2003	(Puerto Rico) Kristina Brandi	(Italy) Maria Elena Camerin	7–6^{(9–7)}, 6–3

=== Doubles ===
Year	Champions	Runners-up	Score
2012	(Russia) Angelina Gabueva (Russia) Arina Rodionova	(Canada) Sharon Fichman (Canada) Marie-Ève Pelletier	6–4, 6–4
2011	(Russia) Elena Bovina (Russia) Valeria Savinykh	(United States) Varvara Lepchenko (United States) Mashona Washington	7–6^{(8–6)}, 6–3
2010	(United States) Madison Brengle (United States) Asia Muhammad	(Russia) Alina Jidkova (Germany) Laura Siegemund	6–2, 6–4
2009	(Slovenia) Petra Rampre (Austria) Nicole Rottmann	(Argentina) Jorgelina Cravero (Romania) Edina Gallovits	6–3, 3–6, [10–8]
2008	(United States) Raquel Kops-Jones (United States) Abigail Spears	(United States) Angela Haynes (India) Sunitha Rao	6–2, 6–0
2007	(United States) Angela Haynes (United States) Mashona Washington	(Czech Republic) Eva Hrdinová (Canada) Marie-Ève Pelletier	6–4, 6–2
2006	(New Zealand) Leanne Baker (Australia) Nicole Kriz	(South Africa) Chanelle Scheepers (United States) Neha Uberoi	6–7^{(1–7)}, 7–5, 6–3
2005	(United States) Julie Ditty (Venezuela) Milagros Sequera	(Georgia (country)) Salome Devidze (Luxembourg) Mandy Minella	6–2, 6–2
2004	(United States) Teryn Ashley (United States) Laura Granville	(United States) Bethanie Mattek (United States) Shenay Perry	2–6, 3–0, ret.
2003	(United States) Bethanie Mattek (United States) Shenay Perry	(United States) Lindsay Lee-Waters (Slovenia) Petra Rampre	6–2, 2–6, 6–4
