= 2012 EmblemHealth Bronx Open =

- Date: 6–12 August
- Edition: 17th
- Surface: Hard
- Location: Crotona Park East, Bronx, United States

Champions

Singles
- (Switzerland) Romina Oprandi

Doubles
- (Japan) Shuko Aoyama / (Japan) Erika Sema
← 2011 ·	EmblemHealth Bronx Open	· 2019 →

The 2012 EmblemHealth Bronx Open was a professional tennis tournament played on hard courts. It was the seventeenth edition of the tournament which was part of the 2012 ITF Women's Circuit. It took place in Crotona Park East, Bronx, United States between 6 and 12 August 2012. The singles champion was Romina Oprandi.

== WTA entrants ==
=== Seeds ===
Country	Player	Rank^{1}	Seed
SUI	Romina Oprandi	58	1
AUS	Casey Dellacqua	108	2
CZE	Karolína Plíšková	112	3
AUS	Olivia Rogowska	114	4
ARG	Paula Ormaechea	126	5
CZE	Kristýna Plíšková	128	6
JPN	Erika Sema	129	7
GER	Tatjana Malek	137	8

- ^{1} Rankings are as of August 6, 2012.

=== Other entrants ===
The following players received wildcards into the singles main draw:

- (United States) Jacqueline Cako
- (United States) Julia Elbaba
- (United States) Eva Raszkiewicz

The following players received entry by a special ranking:

- (United States) Lauren Albanese

The following players received entry from the qualifying draw:

- (United States) Jan Abaza
- (Japan) Eri Hozumi
- (United Kingdom) Emily Webley-Smith
- (United States) Allie Will

== Champions ==
=== Singles ===
- (Switzerland) Romina Oprandi def. (Russia) Anna Chakvetadze, 5–7, 6–3, 6–3

=== Doubles ===
- (Japan) Shuko Aoyama / (Japan) Erika Sema def. (Japan) Eri Hozumi / (Japan) Miki Miyamura, 6–4, 7–6^{(7–4)}
