= Bronx Open =

Tournament information
- Founded: 1996
- Location: The Bronx, New York City; United States
- Venue: Cary Leeds Tennis Center, Crotona Park
- Category: ITF Women's World Tennis Tour (1996–2012; 2022); WTA International (2019)
- Surface: Hard - outdoors
- Draw: 32S / 32Q / 16D
- Prize money: US$25,000 (1996–98); US$50,000 (1999–2008; 2011–12); US$100,000 (2009–10); US$250,000 (2019); US$60,000 (2022)
- Website: www.nyjtl.org/nyjtl-bronx-open

Current champions (2022)
- Women's singles: Kamilla Rakhimova
- Women's doubles: Anna Blinkova (Switzerland) Simona Waltert

The Bronx Open (currently sponsored as the NYJTL Bronx Open) is a tournament for professional female tennis players played on outdoor hardcourts. It is classified as a $60,000 ITF Women's World Tennis Tour event and has been held in The Bronx, New York, since 1996.

In 2019, it was held as a once-off WTA International event before returning on the ITF Women's World Tennis Tour in 2022.

== Past finals ==
=== Singles ===
Year	Champion	Runner-up	Score
↓ ITF tournament ↓
1996	(Spain) Virginia Ruano Pascual	(France) Amélie Mauresmo	6–4, 6–3
1997	(Australia) Rachel McQuillan	(United States) Erika deLone	6–1, 6–4
1998	(France) Sarah Pitkowski-Malcor	(Zimbabwe) Cara Black	6–3, 7–5
1999	(United States) Erika deLone	(Belgium) Els Callens	6–1, ret.
2000	(Slovakia) Daniela Hantuchová	(China) Yi Jingqian	6–4, 6–4
2001	(Austria) Barbara Schwartz	(Germany) Martina Müller	5–7, 6–3, 7–6^{(7–3)}
2002	(United States) Ashley Harkleroad	(Slovakia) Ľubomíra Kurhajcová	6–1, 6–3
2003	(China) Zheng Jie	(Russia) Maria Kirilenko	4–6, 6–4, 6–4
2004	(Israel) Evgenia Linetskaya	(Spain) Nuria Llagostera Vives	4–6, 6–3, 6–4
2005	(Austria) Sybille Bammer	(France) Camille Pin	3–6, 6–4, 6–4
2006	(Russia) Olga Puchkova	(Belarus) Tatiana Poutchek	6–3, 6–1
2007	(Australia) Casey Dellacqua	(United States) Ahsha Rolle	7–5, 2–0 ret.
2008	(Russia) Elena Bovina	(Germany) Anna-Lena Grönefeld	6–3, 7–5
2009	(Germany) Tatjana Malek	(Germany) Kristina Barrois	6–1, 6–4
2010	(Russia) Anna Chakvetadze	(Sweden) Sofia Arvidsson	4–6, 6–2, 6–2
2011	(Czech Republic) Andrea Hlaváčková	(Germany) Mona Barthel	7–6^{(10–8)}, 6–3
2012	(Switzerland) Romina Oprandi	(Russia) Anna Chakvetadze	5–7, 6–3, 6–3
2013–18	Not held		
↓ WTA 250 tournament ↓
2019	(Poland) Magda Linette	(Italy) Camila Giorgi	5–7, 7–5, 6–4
2020–21	Not held		
↓ ITF tournament ↓
2022	Kamilla Rakhimova	(Sweden) Mirjam Björklund	6–2, 6–3

=== Doubles ===
Year	Champions	Runners-up	Score
↓ ITF tournament ↓
1996	(Finland) Nanne Dahlman (United Kingdom) Clare Wood	(South Africa) Liezel Huber (Greece) Christina Papadaki	6–2, 6–3
1997	(Australia) Rachel McQuillan (Australia) Lisa McShea	(United Kingdom) Shirli-Ann Siddall (United Kingdom) Lorna Woodroffe	6–2, 6–1
1998	(United Kingdom) Julie Pullin (United Kingdom) Lorna Woodroffe	(Greece) Christina Papadaki (France) Sarah Pitkowski-Malcor	6–3, 6–1
1999	(South Africa) Surina de Beer (Japan) Nana Miyagi	(Netherlands) Seda Noorlander (Austria) Patricia Wartusch	3–6, 6–0, 6–3
2000	(South Africa) Surina de Beer (Japan) Nana Miyagi	(France) Alexandra Fusai (France) Émilie Loit	5–7, 6–4, 6–4
2001	(Argentina) Clarisa Fernández (Japan) Rika Fujiwara	(Netherlands) Kristie Boogert (Belgium) Els Callens	2–6, 7–6^{(7–3)}, 6–4
2002	(Estonia) Maret Ani (Italy) Flavia Pennetta	(Japan) Shinobu Asagoe (Japan) Nana Miyagi	6–4, 6–1
2003	(Ukraine) Yuliya Beygelzimer (Belarus) Tatiana Poutchek	(Italy) Mara Santangelo (Tunisia) Selima Sfar	6–4, 7–5
2004	(China) Li Na (China) Liu Nannan	(United States) Jessica Lehnhoff (Australia) Christina Wheeler	5–7, 6–3, 6–3
2005	(China) Li Ting (China) Sun Tiantian	(Belarus) Tatiana Poutchek (Belarus) Anastasiya Yakimova	2–6, 6–2, 6–4
2006	(United States) Julie Ditty (South Africa) Natalie Grandin	(Czech Republic) Lucie Hradecká (Czech Republic) Michaela Paštiková	6–1, 7–6^{(7–2)}
2007	(Czech Republic) Lucie Hradecká (Poland) Urszula Radwańska	(Ukraine) Mariya Koryttseva (Belarus) Darya Kustova	6–3, 1–6, 6–1
2008	(United States) Raquel Kops-Jones (United States) Abigail Spears	(United States) Angela Haynes (United States) Ahsha Rolle	6–4, 6–3
2009	(Germany) Anna-Lena Grönefeld (United States) Vania King	(France) Julie Coin (Canada) Marie-Ève Pelletier	6–0, 6–3
2010	(Germany) Kristina Barrois (Austria) Yvonne Meusburger	(South Africa) Natalie Grandin (United States) Abigail Spears	1–6, 6–4, [15–13]
2011	(United States) Megan Moulton-Levy (United States) Ahsha Rolle	(China) Han Xinyun (China) Lu Jingjing	6–3, 7–6^{(7–5)}
2012	(Japan) Shuko Aoyama (Japan) Erika Sema	(Japan) Eri Hozumi (Japan) Miki Miyamura	6–4, 7–6^{(7–4)}
2013–18	Not held		
↓ WTA 250 tournament ↓
2019	(Croatia) Darija Jurak (Spain) María José Martínez Sánchez	(Russia) Margarita Gasparyan (Romania) Monica Niculescu	7–5, 2–6, [10–7]
2020–21	Not held		
↓ ITF tournament ↓
2022	Anna Blinkova (Switzerland) Simona Waltert	(South Korea) Han Na-lae (Japan) Hiroko Kuwata	6–3, 6–3
