= Megan Moulton-Levy =

Jamaican-American tennis player

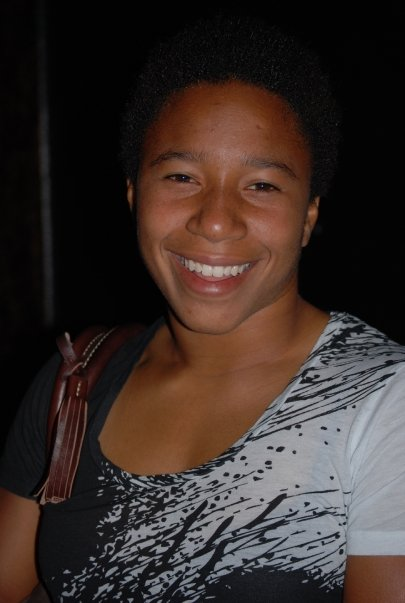
- Country (sports): Jamaica (2003–2007); United States (2008–2017)
- Residence: Washington, D.C.
- Born: March 11, 1985 (age 41) Grosse Pointe, Michigan
- Height: 1.52 m (5 ft 0 in)
- Turned pro: 2008
- Plays: Right (one-handed backhand)
- Prize money: $329,573

Singles
- Career record: 55–52
- Career titles: 0 WTA, 1 ITF
- Highest ranking: No. 237 (July 6, 2009)

Doubles
- Career record: 178–173
- Career titles: 1 WTA, 10 ITF
- Highest ranking: No. 50 (July 22, 2013)

Grand Slam doubles results
- Australian Open: 2R (2013, 2017)
- French Open: 2R (2013)
- Wimbledon: 2R (2013)
- US Open: 2R (2013, 2014)

Megan Moulton-Levy (born March 11, 1985) is a Jamaican-American former professional tennis player. Her career-high singles ranking is world No. 237, which she reached on 6 July 2009. Her career-high WTA doubles ranking is 50, achieved on 22 July 2013.

== Early life ==
Her mother is Dr. Paulette Moulton, a dermatologist, and her father is Dr. George Levy, a record-setting sprinter at Nebraska who competed in the 1972 Munich Olympics in the 100m and 4 × 100 m, and who is now an ear, nose and throat doctor. She was born in Grosse Pointe, Michigan, and has three sisters.

== College ==
Moulton-Levy attended Aiglon College, an international boarding school in Switzerland. She played at the College of William & Mary in Williamsburg, Virginia from 2004 to 2008. She was a four-time Colonial Athletic Association (CAA) Women's Tennis Player of the Year; this four-time player of the year selection marked her as only the second athlete, regardless of sport or gender, to ever sweep such an award in the CAA's history. Her three selections as the CAA Tournament MVP are also the most ever. Moulton-Levy was also a six-time All-American who reached the semifinals of the 2006 NCAA Singles Championship and the final of the 2007 NCAA Doubles Championship. Finally, she twice received the National ITA/Arthur Ashe Jr. Award for Leadership and Sportsmanship. She also won the most combined singles and doubles matches in school history (249).

== WTA Tour finals ==
=== Doubles: 1 (title) ===
Legend International (1–0)	Finals by surface Hard (1–0)

Result	Date	Tournament	Surface	Partner	Opponents	Score
Win	Apr 2014	Monterrey Open, Mexico	Hard	(Croatia) Darija Jurak	(Hungary) Tímea Babos (Belarus) Olga Govortsova	7–6^{(5)}, 3–6, [11–9]

== ITF Circuit finals ==
$100,000 tournaments
$75,000 tournaments
$50,000 tournaments
$25,000 tournaments
$10,000 tournaments

=== Singles: 2 (1 title, 1 runner-up) ===
Result	No.	Date	Tournament	Surface	Opponent	Score
Win	1.	Jul 2008	ITF Evansville, United States	Hard	(United Kingdom) Emily Webley-Smith	6–3, 6–4
Loss	1.	Nov 2008	ITF Puebla, Mexico	Hard	(Bolivia) María Fernanda Álvarez Terán	4–6, 6–3, 4–6

=== Doubles: 22 (10 titles, 12 runner-ups) ===
Result	No.	Date	Tournament	Surface	Partner	Opponents	Score
Win	1.	Jun 2004	ITF Alcobaça, Portugal	Hard	(Jamaica) Alanna Broderick	(Italy) Krizia Borgarello (Italy) Silvia Disderi	7–5, 6–1
Loss	1.	Jun 2004	ITF Montemor-o-Novo, Portugal	Hard	(Jamaica) Alanna Broderick	(Portugal) Frederica Piedade (Switzerland) Aliénor Tricerri	4–6, 3–6
Win	2.	Aug 2008	ITF London-Cumberland, UK	Hard	(United Kingdom) Emily Webley-Smith	(Slovakia) Martina Babáková (Georgia (country)) Manana Shapakidze	6–1, 6–1
Win	3.	Nov 2008	ITF Puebla, Mexico	Hard	(United States) Audra Cohen	(Bolivia) María Fernanda Álvarez (Argentina) Veronica Spiegel	6–2, 6–4
Loss	2.	Dec 2008	ITF Delhi, India	Hard	(United Kingdom) Emily Webley-Smith	(Chinese Taipei) Hwang I-hsuan (Hong Kong) Zhang Ling	3–6, 6–7^{(4)}
Loss	3.	Jan 2009	ITF Laguna Niguel, US	Hard	(Germany) Laura Siegemund	(Germany) Vanessa Henke (Croatia) Darija Jurak	6–4, 3–6, [8–10]
Loss	4.	Mar 2009	ITF Cairo, Egypt	Clay	(Germany) Laura Siegemund	(Hungary) Anikó Kapros (Hungary) Katalin Marosi	5–7, 3–6
Loss	5.	Jun 2009	ITF Belém, Brazil	Hard	(Brazil) Ana Clara Duarte	(Brazil) Maria Fernanda Alves (Brazil) Carla Tiene	6–7^{(1)}, 5–7
Loss	6.	Jul 2009	ITF Boston, US	Hard	(United States) Mallory Cecil	(Brazil) Maria Fernanda Alves (United States) Ahsha Rolle	1–6, 6–4, [6–10]
Win	4.	Jan 2010	ITF Wrexham, UK	Hard (i)	(United States) Mallory Cecil	(Czech Republic) Iveta Gerlová (Czech Republic) Lucie Kriegsmannová	4–6, 6–0, [11–9]
Loss	7.	Jan 2010	Open de l'Isère, France	Hard (i)	(United States) Mallory Cecil	(France) Victoria Larrière (France) Irina Ramialison	3–6, 4–6
Win	5.	May 2010	Carson Challenger, US	Hard	(United States) Lindsay Lee-Waters	(United States) Christina Fusano (United States) Courtney Nagle	6–1, 6–2
Loss	8.	Jun 2010	ITF Boston, US	Hard	(United States) Lindsay Lee-Waters	(United States) Kimberly Couts (Ukraine) Tetiana Luzhanska	4–6, 6–3, [8–10]
Win	6.	Jul 2010	ITF Grapevine, US	Hard	(United States) Lindsay Lee-Waters	(United States) Kimberly Couts (Ukraine) Tetiana Luzhanska	6–2, 7–5
Win	7.	Sep 2010	ITF Albuquerque, US	Hard	(United States) Lindsay Lee-Waters	(United States) Abigail Spears (United States) Mashona Washington	2–6, 6–3, [10–8]
Win	8.	Oct 2010	Las Vegas Open, US	Hard	(United States) Lindsay Lee-Waters	(United States) Irina Falconi (United States) Maria Sanchez	1–6, 7–5, [10–4]
Loss	9.	May 2011	ITF Prague Open, Czech Republic	Clay	(United States) Lindsay Lee-Waters	(Czech Republic) Petra Cetkovská (Netherlands) Michaëlla Krajicek	2–6, 1–6
Loss	10.	Jul 2011	ITF Waterloo, Canada	Clay	(Canada) Eugenie Bouchard	(United States) Alexandra Mueller (United States) Asia Muhammad	3–6, 6–3, [7–10]
Loss	11.	Jul 2011	Lexington Challenger, US	Hard	(United States) Lindsay Lee-Waters	(Belgium) Tamaryn Hendler (United States) Chiara Scholl	6–7^{(9)}, 6–3, [7–10]
Win	9.	Aug 2011	Bronx Open, US	Hard	(United States) Ahsha Rolle	(China) Han Xinyun (China) Lu Jingjing	6–3, 7–6^{(5)}
Loss	12.	Nov 2011	ITF Grapevine, US	Hard	(United States) Lindsay Lee-Waters	(United States) Jamie Hampton (China) Zhang Shuai	4–6, 0–6
Win	10.	Mar 2012	ITF Osprey, US	Clay	(United States) Lindsay Lee-Waters	(Russia) Alexandra Panova (Ukraine) Lesia Tsurenko	2–6, 6–4, [10–7]

== Grand Slam performance timelines ==
Key
W	F	SF	QF	#R	RR	Q#	DNQ	A	NH

(W) winner; (F) finalist; (SF) semifinalist; (QF) quarterfinalist; (#R) rounds 4, 3, 2, 1; (RR) round-robin stage; (Q#) qualification round; (DNQ) did not qualify; (A) absent; (NH) not held; (SR) strike rate (events won / competed); (W–L) win–loss record.

=== Doubles ===
Tournament	2011	2012	2013	2014	2015	2016	2017	SR	W–L	Win %
Australian Open	A	A	2R	1R	1R	A	2R	0 / 4	2–4	33%
French Open	A	A	2R	1R	A	A	A	0 / 2	1–2	33%
Wimbledon	1R	1R	2R	1R	A	A	A	0 / 4	1–4	20%
US Open	A	1R	2R	2R	A	A	1R	0 / 4	2–4	33%
Win–loss	0–1	0–2	4–4	1–4	0–1	0–0	1–2	0 / 14	6–14	30%
