= Ahsha Rolle =

American tennis player

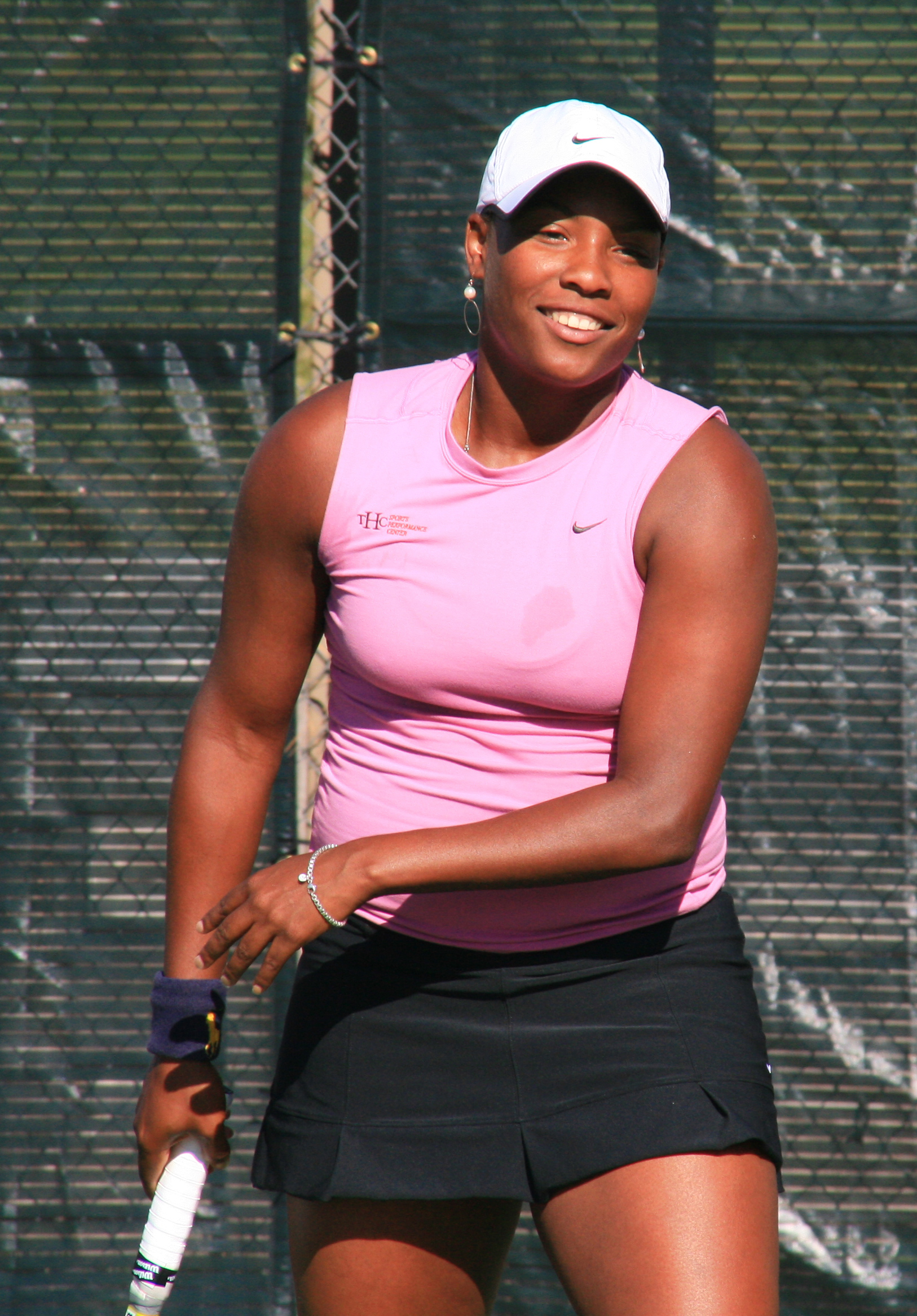
- Rolle in 2008
- Country (sports): United States
- Born: March 21, 1985 (age 41) Miami, Florida, U.S.
- Height: 1.72 m (5 ft 8 in)
- Turned pro: 2004
- Retired: 2013
- Plays: Right-handed (one-handed backhand)
- Prize money: $388,608

Singles
- Career record: 237–207
- Career titles: 3 ITF
- Highest ranking: No. 82 (September 10, 2007)

Grand Slam singles results
- Australian Open: 1R (2007)
- French Open: Q2 (2006, 2007, 2008)
- Wimbledon: Q3 (2007)
- US Open: 3R (2007)

Doubles
- Career record: 165–144
- Career titles: 10 ITF
- Highest ranking: No. 111 (October 17, 2011)

Grand Slam doubles results
- Wimbledon: 1R (2006)
- US Open: 2R (2005)

Ahsha Rolle (born March 21, 1985) is a former tennis player from the United States.

== Tennis career ==
Rolle began playing tennis when she was nine years old. Her career-high singles ranking is No. 82, achieved in September 2007. In October 2011, she peaked at No. 111 in the doubles rankings.

She played at the 2007 US Open as a wildcard entry, and defeated 17th seeded Tatiana Golovin in the first round, and Karin Knapp in the second before falling to Dinara Safina.

Due to injuries, Rolle retired from professional tennis in 2013, at the age of 28.

== ITF Circuit finals ==
$100,000 tournaments
$75,000 tournaments
$50,000 tournaments
$25,000 tournaments
$10,000 tournaments

=== Singles: 6 (3 titles, 3 runner-ups) ===
Result	No.	Date	Tournament	Surface	Opponent	Score
Win	1.	January 30, 2005	ITF Clearwater, United States	Hard	(Romania) Anda Perianu	6–4, 6–3
Loss	1.	April 17, 2005	ITF Jackson, United States	Clay	Varvara Lepchenko	3–6, 2–6
Win	2.	October 9, 2005	ITF Troy, United States	Hard	(Russia) Maria Kondratieva	6–1, 7–5
Win	3.	September 24, 2006	ITF Albuquerque, United States	Hard	Kristina Brandi	6–2, 6–4
Loss	2.	October 8, 2006	ITF Troy, United States	Hard	(Venezuela) Milagros Sequera	5–7, 0–6
Loss	3.	August 19, 2007	ITF The Bronx, United States	Hard	(Australia) Casey Dellacqua	5–7, 0–2 ret.

=== Doubles: 20 (10 titles, 10 runner-ups) ===
Result	No.	Date	Tournament	Surface	Partner	Opponents	Score
Win	1.	July 5, 2003	ITF Waco, United States	Hard	(Jamaica) Alanna Broderick	(Germany) Kim Niggemeyer (Argentina) Cintia Tortorella	7–6^{(5)}, 6–2
Loss	1.	May 22, 2004	ITF El Paso, United States	Hard	(United States) Tiya Rolle	(Republic of Ireland) Anne Mall (United States) Beau Jones	1–6, 5–7
Loss	2.	May 29, 2004	ITF Houston, United States	Hard	(United States) Angela Haynes	(Brazil) Bruna Colósio (Republic of Ireland) Anne Mall	6–7^{(5)}, 4–6
Loss	3.	April 16, 2005	ITF Jackson, United States	Clay	(Venezuela) Milagros Sequera	(Australia) Anastasia Rodionova (United States) Kristen Schlukebir	1–6, 6–3, 2–6
Loss	4.	July 23, 2005	ITF Hammond, United States	Hard	(United States) Christina Fusano	(United States) Mary Gambale (United States) Kelley Hyndman	6–2, 3–6, 5–7
Loss	5.	October 1, 2005	ITF Ashland, United States	Hard	(Brazil) Maria Fernanda Alves	(United States) Teryn Ashley (United States) Amy Frazier	1–6, 4–6
Win	2.	March 25, 2006	ITF Redding, United States	Hard	(Russia) Vasilisa Bardina	(United Kingdom) Elena Baltacha (Israel) Yevgenia Savransky	5–7, 7–5, 6–4
Win	3.	April 6, 2008	ITF Pelham, United States	Clay	(Czech Republic) Michaela Paštiková	(South Korea) Lee Ye-ra (Japan) Remi Tezuka	7–5, 6–2
Loss	6.	August 16, 2008	ITF The Bronx, United States	Hard	(United States) Angela Haynes	(United States) Raquel Kops-Jones (United States) Abigail Spears	4–6, 3–6
Loss	7.	February 22, 2009	ITF Surprise, United States	Hard	(Belgium) Yanina Wickmayer	(Argentina) Jorgelina Cravero (Russia) Ekaterina Lopes	1–6, 1–6
Win	4.	July 4, 2009	ITF Boston, United States	Hard	(Brazil) Maria Fernanda Alves	(United States) Mallory Cecil (United States) Megan Moulton-Levy	6–1, 4–6, [10–6]
Win	5.	August 8, 2009	ITF Vancouver, Canada	Hard	(United States) Riza Zalameda	(United States) Madison Brengle (United States) Lilia Osterloh	6–4, 6–3
Loss	8.	May 1, 2010	ITF Charlottesville, United States	Clay	(United States) Alexandra Mueller	(United States) Julie Ditty (United States) Carly Gullickson	4–6, 3–6
Loss	9.	May 15, 2010	ITF Raleigh, United States	Clay	(United States) Alexandra Mueller	(United States) Kristie Ahn (United States) Nicole Gibbs	3–6, 2–6
Win	6.	June 12, 2010	ITF El Paso, United States	Hard	(United States) Angela Haynes	(United States) Lindsay Lee-Waters (United States) Ashley Weinhold	6–3, 6–7^{(5)}, [10–7]
Win	7.	November 6, 2010	ITF Grapevine, United States	Hard	(United States) Mashona Washington	(United States) Julie Ditty (South Africa) Chanelle Scheepers	5–7, 6–2, [11–9]
Win	8.	January 16, 2011	ITF Plantation, United States	Clay	(United States) Mashona Washington	(United States) Christina Fusano (United States) Yasmin Schnack	6–4, 6–2
Win	9.	January 23, 2011	ITF Lutz, United States	Clay	(United States) Mashona Washington	(Canada) Gabriela Dabrowski (Canada) Sharon Fichman	6–4, 6–4
Win	10.	August 13, 2011	Bronx Open, United States	Hard	(United States) Megan Moulton-Levy	(China) Han Xinyun (China) Lu Jingjing	6–3, 7–6^{(5)}
Loss	10.	January 22, 2012	ITF Plantation, United States	Clay	(United States) Jessica Pegula	(Colombia) Catalina Castaño (France) Laura Thorpe	4–6, 2–6
