= Romina Oprandi =

Swiss-Italian tennis player

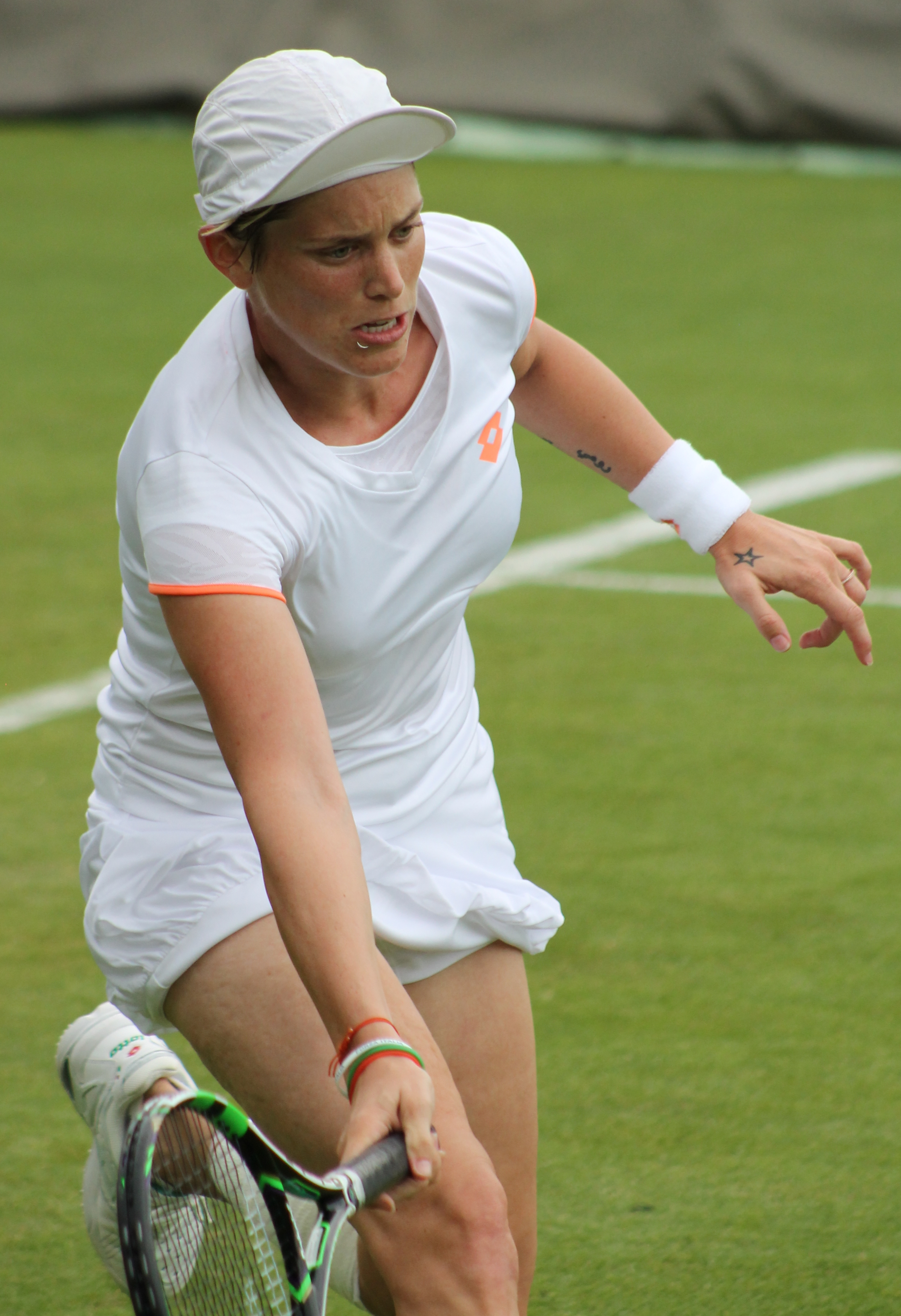
- Oprandi at the 2014 Wimbledon Championships
- Full name: Romina Sarina Oprandi
- Country (sports): Italy (2005–2012); Switzerland (from 2012)
- Residence: Bern, Switzerland
- Born: 29 March 1986 (age 40) Jegenstorf, Switzerland
- Height: 1.72 m (5 ft 8 in)
- Turned pro: 2005
- Retired: 2020
- Plays: Right (two-handed backhand)
- Prize money: $1,521,129

Singles
- Career record: 408–219
- Career titles: 26 ITF
- Highest ranking: No. 32 (10 June 2013)

Grand Slam singles results
- Australian Open: 3R (2012)
- French Open: 1R (2007, 2011, 2012, 2013, 2014)
- Wimbledon: 2R (2010, 2012)
- US Open: 2R (2011, 2012)

Doubles
- Career record: 113–79
- Career titles: 1 WTA, 11 ITF
- Highest ranking: No. 112 (28 May 2007)

Grand Slam doubles results
- Australian Open: 1R (2007, 2011, 2013, 2015)
- French Open: 1R (2011, 2012, 2013)
- Wimbledon: 2R (2013)
- US Open: 2R (2012)

Team competitions
- Fed Cup: W (2006), record 3–1

Romina Sarina Oprandi (born 29 March 1986) is a retired tennis player. She has dual Swiss-Italian citizenship and represented both countries; she first represented Italy from her professional debut in 2005 until January 2012, when she joined the Swiss Tennis Federation.

She has won 26 singles titles and 11 doubles titles on the ITF Women's Circuit, and also one doubles title on the WTA Tour. On 10 June 2013, she achieved a career-high singles ranking of world No. 32.

== Early years and playing style ==
Romina was born to Roberto and Romy Oprandi in Jegenstorf. She was coached by her brother, Romeo Oprandi. Her favourite surface is clay.

Oprandi is a strong baseliner. She particularly enjoys playing drop shots.

== Tennis career ==
=== 2005–2006 ===
Oprandi first came to prominence in the top tier of women's tennis when she reached the quarterfinals of a Tier I event in Rome as a qualifier, losing to Svetlana Kuznetsova, 4–6, 7–5, 6–7. Romina won an ITF singles title at Denain, which was her best result for the rest of the 2006 season.

=== 2007–2009 ===
Oprani played several tournaments on the main tour, including the Australian Open, Doha, Indian Wells, Miami, Amelia Island, Charleston, Rome, and the French Open. At Barcelona, she retired in the first round. Romina then did not play for the rest of the 2007 season and the first half of the 2008 season due to a right forearm injury.

She returned to tennis in August 2008 at an ITF event in Monteroni d'Arabia, Italy. She won an ITF tournament in Wahlstedt, Germany and reached the final in Mestre, Italy.

Oprandi played in her first WTA Tour event in over 18 months 2009 in Bogotá, Colombia where she lost in the first round, 6–3, 6–7, 6–7. She won the doubles title at Buchen, partnering Sandra Martinović.

=== 2012–2014 ===
On 12 August 2012, Oprandi defeated Anna Chakvetadze in three sets to win the Bronx Open singles title held in New York.

She reached two WTA Tour semifinals in 2013, in Oeiras and Brussels, but then suffered a shoulder injury which kept her out of action for eight months.

In April 2014, Oprandi reached her first WTA Tour final at the third time of asking by beating top seed Daniela Hantuchová in the semifinals at the Marrakech Grand Prix. She lost to María Teresa Torró Flor in the final, in three sets. The same day, she won her first WTA Tour doubles title at the same tournament, partnering with Garbiñe Muguruza to defeat Katarzyna Piter and Maryna Zanevska in the final.

== Grand Slam performance timelines ==
Key
W	F	SF	QF	#R	RR	Q#	P#	DNQ	A	Z#	PO	G	S	B	NMS	NTI	P	NH

(W) winner; (F) finalist; (SF) semifinalist; (QF) quarterfinalist; (#R) rounds 4, 3, 2, 1; (RR) round-robin stage; (Q#) qualification round; (P#) preliminary round; (DNQ) did not qualify; (A) absent; (Z#) Davis/Fed Cup Zonal Group (with number indication) or (PO) play-off; (G) gold, (S) silver or (B) bronze Olympic/Paralympic medal; (NMS) not a Masters tournament; (NTI) not a Tier I tournament; (P) postponed; (NH) not held; (SR) strike rate (events won / competed); (W–L) win–loss record.
To avoid confusion and double counting, these charts are updated at the conclusion of a tournament or when the player's participation has ended.

Only main-draw results in WTA Tour, Grand Slam tournaments, Fed Cup and Olympic Games are included in win–loss records.

=== Singles ===
Tournament	2005	2006	2007	2008	2009	2010	2011	2012	2013	2014	2015	2016	...	2019	SR	W–L	Win%
Grand Slam tournaments
Australian Open	A	Q2	1R	A	A	A	1R	3R	2R	A	1R	A		A	0 / 5	3–5	38%
French Open	A	Q3	1R	A	Q2	Q1	1R	1R	1R	1R	Q1	Q1		Q2	0 / 5	0–5	0%
Wimbledon	A	1R	A	A	A	2R	1R	2R	1R	1R	Q2	A		A	0 / 6	2–6	25%
US Open	A	1R	A	A	Q1	1R	2R	2R	A	1R	Q2	A		A	0 / 5	2–5	29%
Win–loss	0–0	0–2	0–2	0–0	0–0	1–2	1–4	4–4	1–3	0–3	0–1	0–0		0–0	0 / 21	7–21	25%
Premier Mandatory & 5 + former
Dubai / Qatar Open (Note: The first Premier 5 event of the year has switched back and forth between the Dubai Tennis Championships and the Qatar Ladies Open since 2009. Dubai was classified as a Premier 5 event from 2009 to 2011 before being succeeded by Doha for the 2012–2014 period. In 2015, Dubai regained its Premier 5 status while Doha was demoted to Premier status. The Premier 5 tournaments were reclassified as WTA 1000 tournaments in 2021.)	A	A	A	A	A	A	A	A	2R	A	A	A		A	0 / 1	1–1	50%
Indian Wells Open	A	A	2R	A	A	A	1R	A	1R	Q1	A	A		A	0 / 3	1–3	25%
Miami Open	A	A	1R	A	A	A	A	A	3R	2R	A	A		A	0 / 3	3–3	50%
German / Madrid Open (Note: In 2009, the German Open was replaced by the Madrid Open. The Premier Mandatory tournaments were reclassified as WTA 1000 tournaments in 2021.)	A	A	A	A	A	A	A	A	A	A	A	A		A	0 / 0	0–0	–
Italian Open	A	QF	1R	A	Q1	1R	2R	A	2R	1R	A	A		A	0 / 6	5–6	45%
Canadian Open	A	A	A	A	A	A	A	A	A	1R	A	A		A	0 / 1	0–1	0%
Cincinnati Open	A	A	A	A	A	A	A	A	A	1R	A	A		A	0 / 1	0–1	0%
Pan Pacific / Wuhan Open (Note: In 2014, the Pan Pacific Open was downgraded to a Premier event and replaced by the Wuhan Open. The Premier 5 tournaments were reclassified as WTA 1000 tournaments in 2021.)	A	A	A	A	A	A	A	1R	A	1R	A	A		A	0 / 2	0–2	0%
China Open	A	A	A	A	A	A	A	QF	A	2R	A	A		A	0 / 2	4–2	67%
Charleston Open (former)	A	A	1R	A	A	A	A	A	A	A	A	A		A	0 / 1	0–1	0%
Win–loss	0–0	3–1	1–4	0–0	0–0	0–1	1–2	3–2	4–4	2–6	0–0	0–0		0–0	0 / 20	14–20	41%
Career statistics
	2005	2006	2007	2008	2009	2010	2011	2012	2013	2014	2015	2016	...	2019	SR	W–L	Win%
Tournaments	1	7	14	0	1	5	14	14	13	14	2	3		0	Career total: 88		
Titles	0	0	0	0	0	0	0	0	0	0	0	0		0	Career total: 0		
Finals	0	0	0	0	0	0	0	0	0	1	0	0		0	Career total: 1		
Overall win–loss	0–1	7–6	5–14	0–0	0–1	4–5	6–14	9–14	16–14	9–13	1–2	0–3		0–0	0 / 88	57–87	40%
Year-end ranking	240	46	250	331	220	66	83	61	79	118	124	397		821	$1,521,129		

=== Doubles ===
Tournament	2006	2007	2008	2009	2010	2011	2012	2013	2014	2015	SR	W–L	Win%
Grand Slam tournaments
Australian Open	A	1R	A	A	A	1R	A	1R	A	1R	0 / 4	0–4	0%
French Open	A	A	A	A	A	1R	1R	1R	A	A	0 / 3	0–3	0%
Wimbledon	Q1	A	A	A	A	A	A	2R	A	A	0 / 1	1–1	50%
US Open	1R	A	A	A	1R	A	2R	A	1R	A	0 / 4	1–4	20%
Win–loss	0–1	0–1	0–0	0–0	0–1	0–2	1–2	1–3	0–1	0–1	0 / 12	2–12	14%
Premier Mandatory & 5
Italian Open	1R	QF	A	A	1R	1R	A	A	A	A	0 / 4	1–4	20%
Win–loss	0–1	1–1	0–0	0–0	0–1	0–1	0–0	0–0	0–0	0–0	0 / 4	1–4	20%
Career statistics
Tournaments	4	5	0	1	3	5	5	5	3	1	Career total: 32		
Titles	0	0	0	0	0	0	0	0	1	0	Career total: 1		
Finals	0	0	0	0	0	0	0	0	1	0	Career total: 1		
Overall win–loss	1–4	4–5	0–0	1–1	1–3	1–5	2–4	2–5	4–2	0–1	1 / 32	16–30	35%
Year-end ranking	180	174	393	245	264	316	182	256	166	1104			

== WTA Tour finals ==
Legend
Premier M & Premier 5
Premier
International

=== Singles: 1 (runner-up) ===
Result	Date	Tournament	Tier	Surface	Opponent	Score
Loss	Apr 2014	Morocco Open	International	Clay	(Spain) María Teresa Torró Flor	3–6, 6–3, 3–6

=== Doubles: 1 (title) ===
Result	Date	Tournament	Tier	Surface	Partner	Opponents	Score
Win	Apr 2014	Morocco Open	International	Clay	(Spain) Garbiñe Muguruza	(Poland) Katarzyna Piter (Ukraine) Maryna Zanevska	4–6, 6–2, [11–9]

== ITF Circuit finals ==
Legend
$100,000 tournaments
$75,000 tournaments
$50,000 tournaments
$25,000 tournaments
$10/15,000 tournaments

=== Singles: 41 (26 titles, 15 runner-ups) ===
Result	W–L	Date	Tournament	Tier	Surface	Opponent	Score
Loss	0–1	Apr 2004	ITF Bol, Croatia	10,000	Clay	(Czech Republic) Lucie Hradecká	4–6, 3–6
Loss	0–2	May 2004	ITF Casale Monferrato, Italy	10,000	Clay	(Croatia) Matea Mezak	0–2 ret.
Win	1–2	May 2004	ITF Elda, Spain	10,000	Clay	(Spain) Nuria Roig	6–2, 6–3
Win	2–2	Feb 2005	ITF Mallorca, Spain	10,000	Clay	(Italy) Anna Floris	6–3, 6–0
Win	3–2	Mar 2005	ITF Las Palmas, Spain	10,000	Clay	(Austria) Tina Schiechtl	6–3, 6–2
Win	4–2	Mar 2005	ITF Rome, Italy	10,000	Clay	(Serbia) Ana Jovanović	6–4, 7–6^{(4)}
Win	5–2	Apr 2005	ITF Rome, Italy	10,000	Clay	(Romania) Magda Mihalache	6–4, 6–4
Win	6–2	May 2005	ITF Casale Monferrato, Italy	10,000	Clay	(Czech Republic) Sandra Záhlavová	6–2, 6–0
Win	7–2	Nov 2005	ITF Mexico City	25,000	Clay	(Hungary) Kira Nagy	6–3, 6–0
Win	8–2	Nov 2005	ITF Puebla, Mexico	25,000	Clay	(Brazil) Jenifer Widjaja	6–1, 6–1
Win	9–2	Apr 2006	ITF Putignano, Italy	25,000	Hard	(Italy) Alberta Brianti	6–1, 1–6, 6–4
Win	10–2	May 2006	ITF Torrent, Spain	25,000	Clay	(Russia) Ekaterina Makarova	6–1, 6–3
Win	11–2	May 2006	ITF Antalya, Turkey	25,000	Clay	(Czech Republic) Petra Cetkovská	6–3, 7–5
Loss	11–3	Jun 2006	ITF Prostějov, Czech Republic	75,000	Clay	(Israel) Anna Smashnova	w/o
Win	12–3	Sep 2006	Open Porte du Hainaut, France	75,000	Clay	(France) Stéphanie Foretz	6–3, 4–6, 6–3
Win	13–3	Aug 2008	ITF Wahlstedt, Germany	10,000	Clay	(Italy) Giulia Gatto-Monticone	6–3, 6–0
Loss	13–4	Sep 2008	Save Cup Mestre, Italy	50,000	Clay	(Russia) Ekaterina Lopes	3–6, 0–3 ret.
Loss	13–5	Mar 2009	ITF Buchen, Germany	10,000	Carpet (i)	(Germany) Korina Perkovic	3–6, 6–7^{(0)}
Loss	13–6	Nov 2009	ITF Mallorca, Spain	10,000	Clay	(Spain) Sandra Soler-Sola	6–3, 4–6, 2–6
Loss	13–7	Feb 2010	ITF Belfort, France	25,000	Carpet (i)	(Russia) Elena Bovina	6–7^{(3)}, 7–5, 4–6
Loss	13–8	Feb 2010	Biberach Open, Germany	50,000	Hard (i)	(Sweden) Johanna Larsson	6–4, 2–6, 2–6
Win	14–8	Mar 2010	ITF Buchen, Germany	10,000	Carpet (i)	(Ukraine) Irina Buryachok	6–1, 6–3
Loss	14–9	Apr 2010	ITF Tessenderlo, Belgium	25,000	Clay (i)	(Germany) Nicola Geuer	6–4, 2–6, 3–6
Win	15–9	May 2010	ITF Caserta, Italy	25,000	Clay	(United States) Sloane Stephens	6–3, 6–3
Loss	15–10	May 2010	Internazionale di Roma, Italy	50,000	Clay	(Spain) Lourdes Domínguez Lino	7–5, 3–6, 3–6
Win	16–10	Jul 2010	International Country Cuneo, Italy	100,000	Clay	(France) Pauline Parmentier	6–0, 6–2
Win	17–10	Sep 2010	Open de Saint-Malo, France	100,000	Clay	(France) Alizé Cornet	6–2, 2–6, 6–2
Loss	17–11	Sep 2011	Allianz Cup Sofia, Bulgaria	100,000	Clay	(Spain) Sílvia Soler Espinosa	6–2, 6–6 ret.
Win	18–11	Sep 2011	Las Vegas Open, United States	50,000	Hard	(United States) Alexa Glatch	6–7^{(2)}, 6–3, 7–6^{(4)}
Loss	18–12	Oct 2011	ITF Kansas City, United States	50,000	Hard	(United States) Varvara Lepchenko	4–6, 1–6
Win	19–12	Oct 2011	Classic of Troy, United States	50,000	Hard	(United States) Varvara Lepchenko	6–1, 6–2
Win	20–12	Oct 2011	ITF Rock Hill, United States	25,000	Hard	(United States) Grace Min	7–5, 6–1
Win	21–12	Jul 2012	Open de Biarritz, France	100,000	Clay	(Luxembourg) Mandy Minella	7–5, 7–5
Win	22–12	Aug 2012	Bronx Open, United States	50,000	Hard	(Russia) Anna Chakvetadze	5–7, 6–3, 6–3
Win	23–12	May 2015	ITF La Marsa, Tunisia	25,000	Clay	(Latvia) Anastasija Sevastova	6–3, 6–3
Loss	23–13	Jul 2015	ITF Stuttgart, Germany	25,000	Clay	(Japan) Risa Ozaki	4–6, 5–7
Win	24–13	Aug 2015	ITF Bad Saulgau, Germany	25,000	Clay	(Romania) Cristina Dinu	6−3, 6−3
Win	25–13	Aug 2015	Ladies Open Hechingen, Germany	25,000	Clay	(Romania) Ana Bogdan	6–3, 1–6, 6–2
Loss	25–14	Sep 2015	Open de Biarritz, France	100,000	Clay	(Germany) Laura Siegemund	5–7, 3–6
Loss	25–15	May 2016	Nana Trophy Tunis, Tunisia	50,000	Clay	(Tunisia) Ons Jabeur	6–1, 2–6, 2–6
Win	26–15	Sep 2018	ITF Antalya, Turkey	15,000	Hard	(Russia) Daria Nazarkina	6–0, 6–2

=== Doubles: 13 (11 titles, 2 runner-ups) ===
Result	W–L	Date	Tournament	Tier	Surface	Partner	Opponents	Score
Win	1–0	Feb 2005	ITF Mallorca, Spain	10,000	Clay	(Spain) Adriana González-Peñas	(Poland) Olga Brózda (Austria) Tina Schiechtl	6–3, 7–5
Loss	1–1	Feb 2005	ITF Mallorca, Spain	10,000	Clay	(Spain) Adriana González-Peñas	(Poland) Olga Brózda (Czech Republic) Petra Cetkovská	3–6, 4–6
Win	2–1	Mar 2005	ITF Las Palmas, Spain	10,000	Clay	(Switzerland) Vanessa Wellauer	(Russia) Irina Kotkina (France) Charlène Vanneste	7–5, 6–2
Win	3–1	Apr 2005	ITF Rome, Italy	10,000	Clay	(Spain) Adriana González-Peñas	(Hungary) Gréta Arn (Czech Republic) Janette Bejlková	6–3, 6–3
Loss	3–2	Apr 2005	ITF Bari, Italy	25,000	Clay	(Italy) Stefania Chieppa	(Bosnia and Herzegovina) Mervana Jugić-Salkić (Austria) Stefanie Haidner	3–6, 6–7^{(3)}
Win	4–2	Apr 2006	ITF Bari, Italy	25,000	Clay	(Germany) Caroline Schneider	(Austria) Stefanie Haidner (Croatia) Darija Jurak	7–5, 6–2
Win	5–2	May 2006	ITF Antalya, Turkey	25,000	Clay	(Israel) Tzipora Obziler	(Croatia) Matea Mezak (Turkey) İpek Şenoğlu	4–6, 6–4, 6–0
Win	6–2	Sep 2006	Open Porte du Hainaut, France	75,000	Clay	(Germany) Jasmin Wöhr	(Poland) Klaudia Jans (Poland) Alicja Rosolska	4–6, 6–2, 6–4
Win	7–2	Mar 2009	ITF Buchen, Germany	10,000	Carpet (i)	(Bosnia and Herzegovina) Sandra Martinović	(Ukraine) Kateryna Herth (Russia) Anastasia Poltoratskaya	5–7, 7–5, [10–8]
Win	8–2	Sep 2009	Save Cup Mestre, Italy	50,000	Clay	(Austria) Sandra Klemenschits	(Germany) Kristina Barrois (Austria) Yvonne Meusburger	6–4, 6–1
Win	9–2	Nov 2009	ITF Mallorca, Spain	10,000	Clay	(Spain) Laura Pous Tió	(Spain) Leticia Costas (Spain) Inés Ferrer Suárez	7–6^{(5)}, 6–2
Win	10–2	Dec 2009	ITF Benicarló, Spain	10,000	Clay	(Spain) Laura Pous Tió	(Romania) Alexandra Cadanțu (Romania) Diana Enache	6–4, 6–3
Win	11–2	Oct 2012	Ismaning Open, Germany	75,000	Carpet (i)	(Switzerland) Amra Sadiković	(United States) Jill Craybas (Czech Republic) Eva Hrdinová	4–6, 6–3, [10–7]

== Top 10 wins ==
Season	2011	Total
Wins	1	1

#	Player	Rank	Event	Surface	Rd	Score
2011
1.	(Belgium) Kim Clijsters	No. 2	Rosmalen Open, Netherlands	Grass	2R	7–6^{(7–5)}, 6–3
