= 2011 ITF Women's Circuit (October–December) =

The 2011 ITF Women's Circuit was the 2011 edition of the second tier tour for women's professional tennis. It is organised by the International Tennis Federation and is a tier below the WTA Tour. During the months of October to December 2011 over 100 tournaments were played.

== Key ==
$100,000 tournaments
$75,000 tournaments
$50,000 tournaments
$25,000 tournaments
$10,000 tournaments

== October ==
Week of	Tournament	Winner	Runners-up	Semifinalists	Quarterfinalists
October 3	2011 Women's Pro Tennis Classic; Kansas City, Missouri, United States; Hard $50,000; Singles – Doubles	(United States) Varvara Lepchenko; 6–4, 6–1	(Italy) Romina Oprandi	(Croatia) Ajla Tomljanović (United States) Jamie Hampton	(Russia) Olga Puchkova (Venezuela) Gabriela Paz (United States) Madison Brengle (Puerto Rico) Monica Puig
October 3	2011 Women's Pro Tennis Classic; Kansas City, Missouri, United States; Hard $50,000; Singles – Doubles	(Croatia) Maria Abramović (Czech Republic) Eva Hrdinová; 2–6, 6–2, [10–4]	(United States) Jamie Hampton (Croatia) Ajla Tomljanović	(Croatia) Ajla Tomljanović (United States) Jamie Hampton	(Russia) Olga Puchkova (Venezuela) Gabriela Paz (United States) Madison Brengle (Puerto Rico) Monica Puig
October 3	2011 Kōfu International Open; Kōfu, Yamanashi, Japan; Hard $50,000; Singles – Doubles	(Chinese Taipei) Chang Kai-chen; 6–4, 1–6, 6–4	(Luxembourg) Mandy Minella	(Thailand) Tamarine Tanasugarn (Japan) Erika Sema	(Japan) Akiko Omae (Japan) Chihiro Takayama (Japan) Junri Namigata (Japan) Yurika Sema
October 3	2011 Kōfu International Open; Kōfu, Yamanashi, Japan; Hard $50,000; Singles – Doubles	(Chinese Taipei) Chan Chin-wei (Chinese Taipei) Hsu Wen-hsin; 6–3, 6–4	(Japan) Remi Tezuka (Japan) Akiko Yonemura	(Thailand) Tamarine Tanasugarn (Japan) Erika Sema	(Japan) Akiko Omae (Japan) Chihiro Takayama (Japan) Junri Namigata (Japan) Yurika Sema
October 3	2011 Cliffs Esperance Tennis International; Esperance, Western Australia, Australia; Hard $25,000; Singles – Doubles	(Australia) Casey Dellacqua; 6–2, 6–1	(Australia) Olivia Rogowska	(New Zealand) Sacha Jones (United States) Lena Litvak	(United Kingdom) Lisa Whybourn (China) Xu Yifan (China) Tian Ran (Turkey) Pemra Özgen
October 3	2011 Cliffs Esperance Tennis International; Esperance, Western Australia, Australia; Hard $25,000; Singles – Doubles	(Australia) Casey Dellacqua (Australia) Olivia Rogowska; 6–3, 6–2	(Australia) Monique Adamczak (Poland) Sandra Zaniewska	(New Zealand) Sacha Jones (United States) Lena Litvak	(United Kingdom) Lisa Whybourn (China) Xu Yifan (China) Tian Ran (Turkey) Pemra Özgen
October 3	2011 MTS Cup; Yerevan, Armenia; Clay $25,000; Singles – Doubles	(United States) Julia Cohen; 7–6^{(8–6)}, 6–2	(Chile) Andrea Koch Benvenuto	(Ukraine) Elizaveta Ianchuk (Ukraine) Irina Buryachok	(Ukraine) Lesia Tsurenko (Bulgaria) Aleksandrina Naydenova (Italy) Anastasia Grymalska (Armenia) Ani Amiraghyan
October 3	2011 MTS Cup; Yerevan, Armenia; Clay $25,000; Singles – Doubles	(Georgia (country)) Tatia Mikadze (Georgia (country)) Sofia Shapatava; 6–1, 6–4	(Ukraine) Elizaveta Ianchuk (Ukraine) Olga Ianchuk	(Ukraine) Elizaveta Ianchuk (Ukraine) Irina Buryachok	(Ukraine) Lesia Tsurenko (Bulgaria) Aleksandrina Naydenova (Italy) Anastasia Grymalska (Armenia) Ani Amiraghyan
October 3	Solin, Croatia; Clay $10,000; Singles draw – Doubles draw	(Croatia) Dijana Banoveć; 7–5, 7–5	(Slovakia) Zuzana Zlochová	(Croatia) Ivana Klepić (Slovakia) Lucia Butkovská	(Slovakia) Karin Morgošová (Slovenia) Tjaša Šrimpf (Slovenia) Anja Prislan (Czech Republic) Martina Borecká
October 3	Solin, Croatia; Clay $10,000; Singles draw – Doubles draw	(Czech Republic) Martina Borecká (Czech Republic) Petra Krejsová; 3–6, 6–4, [10–3]	(Slovakia) Karin Morgošová (Slovakia) Lenka Tvarošková	(Croatia) Ivana Klepić (Slovakia) Lucia Butkovská	(Slovakia) Karin Morgošová (Slovenia) Tjaša Šrimpf (Slovenia) Anja Prislan (Czech Republic) Martina Borecká
October 3	Settimo San Pietro, Italy; Clay $10,000; Singles draw – Doubles draw	(Germany) Anne Schäfer; 3–6, 6–3, 7–6^{(7–3)}	(Italy) Federica Di Sarra	(Italy) Erika Zanchetta (Germany) Sabrina Baumgarten	(Italy) Elena Bertoia (Italy) Benedetta Davato (Italy) Martina Caregaro (Italy) Andreea Văideanu
October 3	Settimo San Pietro, Italy; Clay $10,000; Singles draw – Doubles draw	(Germany) Carolin Daniels (Germany) Laura Schaeder; 7–5, 6–4	(Italy) Federica Di Sarra (Italy) Alice Savoretti	(Italy) Erika Zanchetta (Germany) Sabrina Baumgarten	(Italy) Elena Bertoia (Italy) Benedetta Davato (Italy) Martina Caregaro (Italy) Andreea Văideanu
October 3	Pirot, Serbia; Clay $10,000; Singles draw – Doubles draw	(Serbia) Natalija Kostić; 6–3, 6–3	(Serbia) Jovana Jakšić	(Serbia) Jelena Lazarević (Serbia) Saška Gavrilovska	(Serbia) Dejana Radanović (Slovakia) Klaudia Boczová (Norway) Emma Flood (Bulgaria) Dalia Zafirova
October 3	Pirot, Serbia; Clay $10,000; Singles draw – Doubles draw	(Hungary) Csilla Argyelán (Bulgaria) Dalia Zafirova; 6–2, 6–2	(Serbia) Jelena Lazarević (Romania) Ana Mihaela Vlăduţu	(Serbia) Jelena Lazarević (Serbia) Saška Gavrilovska	(Serbia) Dejana Radanović (Slovakia) Klaudia Boczová (Norway) Emma Flood (Bulgaria) Dalia Zafirova
October 3	Madrid, Spain; Hard $10,000; Singles draw – Doubles draw	(Venezuela) Marina Giral Lores; 4–6, 6–4, 6–4	(Spain) Nuria Párrizas Díaz	(Argentina) Vanesa Furlanetto (France) Charlene Seateun	(Spain) Lucía Cervera Vázquez (Spain) Isabel Rapisarda Calvo (Italy) Stefania Fadabini (Spain) Carolina Prats Millán
October 3	Madrid, Spain; Hard $10,000; Singles draw – Doubles draw	(Germany) Kim Grajdek (Poland) Justyna Jegiołka; 6–3, 6–3	(Argentina) Vanesa Furlanetto (Argentina) Aranza Salut	(Argentina) Vanesa Furlanetto (France) Charlene Seateun	(Spain) Lucía Cervera Vázquez (Spain) Isabel Rapisarda Calvo (Italy) Stefania Fadabini (Spain) Carolina Prats Millán
October 3	Antalya, Turkey; Clay $10,000; Singles draw – Doubles draw	(Italy) Julia Mayr; 6–1, 6–3	(Italy) Evelyn Mayr	(Italy) Alice Balducci (Italy) Agnese Zucchini	(United Kingdom) Francesca Stephenson (Czech Republic) Zuzana Zálabská (Sweden) Hilda Melander (Italy) Angelica Moratelli
October 3	Antalya, Turkey; Clay $10,000; Singles draw – Doubles draw	(Italy) Evelyn Mayr (Italy) Julia Mayr; 7–6^{(7–5)}, 6–0	(Netherlands) Anouk Tigu (Netherlands) Bernice van de Velde	(Italy) Alice Balducci (Italy) Agnese Zucchini	(United Kingdom) Francesca Stephenson (Czech Republic) Zuzana Zálabská (Sweden) Hilda Melander (Italy) Angelica Moratelli
October 3	Williamsburg, Virginia, United States; Clay $10,000; Singles draw – Doubles draw	(United States) Danielle Collins; 6–1, 6–3	(Russia) Nika Kukharchuk	(Slovakia) Lenka Broošová (United States) Victoria Duval	(Russia) Vasilisa Bardina (United States) Eleanor Peters (Ukraine) Anastasia Kharchenko (United States) Veronica Corning
October 3	Williamsburg, Virginia, United States; Clay $10,000; Singles draw – Doubles draw	(United States) Brittany Augustine (United States) Elizabeth Lumpkin; 6–3, 6–4	(United States) Sylvia Kosakowski (Romania) Cristina Stancu	(Slovakia) Lenka Broošová (United States) Victoria Duval	(Russia) Vasilisa Bardina (United States) Eleanor Peters (Ukraine) Anastasia Kharchenko (United States) Veronica Corning
October 3	2011 Garuda Indonesia Championships Palembang; Palembang, Indonesia; Hard $25,000; Singles – Doubles	(France) Iryna Brémond; 6–2, 6–3	(Indonesia) Ayu-Fani Damayanti	(Thailand) Luksika Kumkhum (Thailand) Varatchaya Wongteanchai	(Indonesia) Lavinia Tananta (South Africa) Chanel Simmonds (Belgium) Tamaryn Hendler (Thailand) Nudnida Luangnam
October 3	2011 Garuda Indonesia Championships Palembang; Palembang, Indonesia; Hard $25,000; Singles – Doubles	(Belgium) Tamaryn Hendler (South Africa) Chanel Simmonds; 6–4, 6–2	(Indonesia) Ayu-Fani Damayanti (Indonesia) Jessy Rompies	(Thailand) Luksika Kumkhum (Thailand) Varatchaya Wongteanchai	(Indonesia) Lavinia Tananta (South Africa) Chanel Simmonds (Belgium) Tamaryn Hendler (Thailand) Nudnida Luangnam
October 3	2011 Izida Cup; Dobrich, Bulgaria; Clay $25,000; Singles – Doubles	(Bulgaria) Elitsa Kostova; 7–6^{(8–6)}, 6–2	(Romania) Elena Bogdan	(Argentina) Catalina Pella (Romania) Mihaela Buzărnescu	(Bulgaria) Dia Evtimova (Italy) Giulia Gatto-Monticone (Bulgaria) Isabella Shinikova (Romania) Cristina Dinu
October 3	2011 Izida Cup; Dobrich, Bulgaria; Clay $25,000; Singles – Doubles	(Romania) Diana Marcu (Romania) Cristina Mitu; 4–6, 6–3, [10–6]	(Romania) Laura-Ioana Andrei (Romania) Cristina Dinu	(Argentina) Catalina Pella (Romania) Mihaela Buzărnescu	(Bulgaria) Dia Evtimova (Italy) Giulia Gatto-Monticone (Bulgaria) Isabella Shinikova (Romania) Cristina Dinu
October 3	São Paulo, Brazil; Clay $10,000; Singles draw – Doubles draw	(Brazil) Paula Cristina Gonçalves; 6–2, 6–3	(Portugal) Bárbara Luz	(Brazil) Maria Fernanda Alves (Brazil) Nathalia Rossi	(Chile) Cecilia Costa Melgar (Argentina) Carla Lucero (Brazil) Nathaly Kurata (Brazil) Flávia Guimarães Bueno
October 3	São Paulo, Brazil; Clay $10,000; Singles draw – Doubles draw	(Brazil) Maria Fernanda Alves (Brazil) Gabriela Cé; 6–2, 6–4	(Brazil) Flávia Dechandt Araújo (Brazil) Paula Cristina Gonçalves	(Brazil) Maria Fernanda Alves (Brazil) Nathalia Rossi	(Chile) Cecilia Costa Melgar (Argentina) Carla Lucero (Brazil) Nathaly Kurata (Brazil) Flávia Guimarães Bueno
October 10	2011 Open GDF SUEZ de Touraine; Joué-lès-Tours, France; Hard $50,000; Singles – Doubles	(United States) Alison Riske; 2–6, 6–2, 7–5	(Uzbekistan) Akgul Amanmuradova	(Russia) Alexandra Panova (Netherlands) Michaëlla Krajicek	(Netherlands) Kiki Bertens (Ukraine) Alona Bondarenko (France) Julie Coin (Czech Republic) Andrea Hlaváčková
October 10	2011 Open GDF SUEZ de Touraine; Joué-lès-Tours, France; Hard $50,000; Singles – Doubles	(Ukraine) Lyudmyla Kichenok (Ukraine) Nadiya Kichenok; 6–2, 6–0	(Greece) Eirini Georgatou (France) Irena Pavlovic	(Russia) Alexandra Panova (Netherlands) Michaëlla Krajicek	(Netherlands) Kiki Bertens (Ukraine) Alona Bondarenko (France) Julie Coin (Czech Republic) Andrea Hlaváčková
October 10	2011 USTA Tennis Classic of Troy; Troy, Alabama, United States; Hard $50,000; Singles – Doubles	(Italy) Romina Oprandi; 6–1, 6–2	(United States) Varvara Lepchenko	(Russia) Olga Puchkova (Kazakhstan) Sesil Karatantcheva	(United States) Shelby Rogers (United States) Chiara Scholl (United States) Grace Min (Russia) Elena Bovina
October 10	2011 USTA Tennis Classic of Troy; Troy, Alabama, United States; Hard $50,000; Singles – Doubles	(Russia) Elena Bovina (Russia) Valeria Savinykh; 7–6^{(8–6)}, 6–3	(United States) Varvara Lepchenko (United States) Mashona Washington	(Russia) Olga Puchkova (Kazakhstan) Sesil Karatantcheva	(United States) Shelby Rogers (United States) Chiara Scholl (United States) Grace Min (Russia) Elena Bovina
October 10	2011 Gold Fields St Ives Tennis International; Kalgoorlie, Australia; Hard $25,000; Singles – Doubles	(Australia) Casey Dellacqua; 6–2, 6–2	(Australia) Monique Adamczak	(Australia) Bojana Bobusic (China) Xu Yifan	(United Kingdom) Melanie South (Poland) Sandra Zaniewska (Australia) Stephanie Bengson (Australia) Olivia Rogowska
October 10	2011 Gold Fields St Ives Tennis International; Kalgoorlie, Australia; Hard $25,000; Singles – Doubles	(Australia) Casey Dellacqua (Australia) Olivia Rogowska; 6–1, 6–1	(China) Xu Yifan (China) Zhang Kailin	(Australia) Bojana Bobusic (China) Xu Yifan	(United Kingdom) Melanie South (Poland) Sandra Zaniewska (Australia) Stephanie Bengson (Australia) Olivia Rogowska
October 10	Sant Cugat del Vallès, Spain; Clay $25,000; Singles draw – Doubles draw	(Hungary) Réka-Luca Jani; 6–4, 6–2	(Georgia (country)) Margalita Chakhnashvili	(Peru) Bianca Botto (Slovakia) Jana Čepelová	(Italy) Annalisa Bona (Spain) Estrella Cabeza Candela (Croatia) Tereza Mrdeža (Spain) Garbiñe Muguruza
October 10	Sant Cugat del Vallès, Spain; Clay $25,000; Singles draw – Doubles draw	(Slovakia) Jana Čepelová (Poland) Katarzyna Piter; 6–3, 2–6, [10–6]	(Spain) Leticia Costas (Spain) Inés Ferrer Suárez	(Peru) Bianca Botto (Slovakia) Jana Čepelová	(Italy) Annalisa Bona (Spain) Estrella Cabeza Candela (Croatia) Tereza Mrdeža (Spain) Garbiñe Muguruza
October 10	Yerevan, Armenia; Clay $10,000; Singles draw – Doubles draw	(Slovakia) Anna Karolína Schmiedlová; 6–4, 6–3	(Georgia (country)) Tatia Mikadze	(Ukraine) Anastasiya Vasylyeva (Ukraine) Olga Ianchuk	(Italy) Anastasia Grymalska (Hungary) Vaszilisza Bulgakova (Armenia) Ani Amiraghyan (Ukraine) Elizaveta Ianchuk
October 10	Yerevan, Armenia; Clay $10,000; Singles draw – Doubles draw	(Italy) Anastasia Grymalska (Ukraine) Anastasiya Vasylyeva; 6–3, 6–3	(Armenia) Ani Amiraghyan (Georgia (country)) Tatia Mikadze	(Ukraine) Anastasiya Vasylyeva (Ukraine) Olga Ianchuk	(Italy) Anastasia Grymalska (Hungary) Vaszilisza Bulgakova (Armenia) Ani Amiraghyan (Ukraine) Elizaveta Ianchuk
October 10	Bol, Croatia; Clay $10,000; Singles draw – Doubles draw	(Croatia) Karla Popović; 6–2, 6–7^{(0–7)}, 7–5	(Croatia) Iva Mekovec	(Germany) Dejana Raickovic (Croatia) Matea Ćurić	(Croatia) Indire Akiki (Croatia) Ema Mikulčić (France) Morgane Pons (Slovakia) Karin Morgošová
October 10	Bol, Croatia; Clay $10,000; Singles draw – Doubles draw	(Slovakia) Karin Morgošová (Slovakia) Lenka Tvarošková; 6–2, 6–0	(France) Morgane Pons (France) Alice Tisset	(Germany) Dejana Raickovic (Croatia) Matea Ćurić	(Croatia) Indire Akiki (Croatia) Ema Mikulčić (France) Morgane Pons (Slovakia) Karin Morgošová
October 10	Cagliari, Italy; Clay $10,000; Singles draw – Doubles draw	(Belarus) Aliaksandra Sasnovich; 6–4, 6–3	(Germany) Anne Schäfer	(Italy) Claudia Giovine (Italy) Martina Caregaro	(Germany) Carolin Daniels (Italy) Sara Savarise (Italy) Erika Zanchetta (Italy) Andreea Văideanu
October 10	Cagliari, Italy; Clay $10,000; Singles draw – Doubles draw	(Italy) Giulia Gabba (Italy) Alice Savoretti; 6–4, 6–4	(Netherlands) Valeria Podda (Netherlands) Jade Schoelink	(Italy) Claudia Giovine (Italy) Martina Caregaro	(Germany) Carolin Daniels (Italy) Sara Savarise (Italy) Erika Zanchetta (Italy) Andreea Văideanu
October 10	Antalya, Turkey; Clay $10,000; Singles draw – Doubles draw	(Italy) Agnese Zucchini; 6–0, ret.	(Romania) Ana Bogdan	(Italy) Alice Balducci (Italy) Evelyn Mayr	(Romania) Laura-Ioana Andrei (Hungary) Csilla Borsányi (Germany) Jasmin Steinherr (Italy) Julia Mayr
October 10	Antalya, Turkey; Clay $10,000; Singles draw – Doubles draw	All doubles matches have been cancelled due to bad weather.		(Italy) Alice Balducci (Italy) Evelyn Mayr	(Romania) Laura-Ioana Andrei (Hungary) Csilla Borsányi (Germany) Jasmin Steinherr (Italy) Julia Mayr
October 10	São Paulo, Brazil; Clay $10,000; Singles draw – Doubles draw	(Argentina) Carolina Zeballos; 6–4, 6–4	(Brazil) Maria Fernanda Alves	(Chile) Cecilia Costa Melgar (Argentina) Carla Lucero	(Argentina) Victoria Bosio (Romania) Daiana Negreanu (Brazil) Flávia Guimarães Bueno (Portugal) Bárbara Luz
October 10	São Paulo, Brazil; Clay $10,000; Singles draw – Doubles draw	(Brazil) Maria Fernanda Alves (Brazil) Karina Venditti; 6–2, 6–4	(Brazil) Gabriela Cé (Chile) Cecilia Costa Melgar	(Chile) Cecilia Costa Melgar (Argentina) Carla Lucero	(Argentina) Victoria Bosio (Romania) Daiana Negreanu (Brazil) Flávia Guimarães Bueno (Portugal) Bárbara Luz
October 10	Astana, Kazakhstan; Hard $10,000; Singles draw – Doubles draw	(Russia) Polina Vinogradova; 6–3, 6–2	(Russia) Alexandra Artamonova	(Kyrgyzstan) Bermet Duvanaeva (Russia) Alexandra Romanova	(Kazakhstan) Yelena Nemchen (Russia) Alena Karpova (Russia) Anastasia Klyueva (Kazakhstan) Anna Danilina
October 10	Astana, Kazakhstan; Hard $10,000; Singles draw – Doubles draw	(Czech Republic) Nikola Fraňková (Russia) Polina Rodionova; 6–2, 5–7, [10–5]	(Russia) Diana Isaeva (United States) Elizaveta Nemchinov	(Kyrgyzstan) Bermet Duvanaeva (Russia) Alexandra Romanova	(Kazakhstan) Yelena Nemchen (Russia) Alena Karpova (Russia) Anastasia Klyueva (Kazakhstan) Anna Danilina
October 17	2011 Open GDF SUEZ Région Limousin; Limoges, France; Hard $50,000; Singles – Doubles	(Romania) Sorana Cîrstea; 6–2, 6–2	(Sweden) Sofia Arvidsson	(United States) Alison Riske (Uzbekistan) Akgul Amanmuradova	(France) Iryna Brémond (France) Irina Ramialison (Netherlands) Michaëlla Krajicek (Spain) Laura Pous Tió
October 17	2011 Open GDF SUEZ Région Limousin; Limoges, France; Hard $50,000; Singles – Doubles	(Sweden) Sofia Arvidsson (United States) Jill Craybas; 6–4, 4–6, [10–7]	(France) Caroline Garcia (France) Aurélie Védy	(United States) Alison Riske (Uzbekistan) Akgul Amanmuradova	(France) Iryna Brémond (France) Irina Ramialison (Netherlands) Michaëlla Krajicek (Spain) Laura Pous Tió
October 17	2011 Rock Hill Rocks Open; Rock Hill, South Carolina, United States; Hard $25,000; Singles – Doubles	(Italy) Romina Oprandi; 7–5, 6–1	(United States) Grace Min	(United States) Danielle Collins (Italy) Camila Giorgi	(Croatia) Ajla Tomljanović (United States) Krista Hardebeck (Kazakhstan) Sesil Karatantcheva (United States) Lauren Davis
October 17	2011 Rock Hill Rocks Open; Rock Hill, South Carolina, United States; Hard $25,000; Singles – Doubles	(Croatia) Maria Abramović (Brazil) Roxane Vaisemberg; 3–6, 6–3, [10–5]	(United States) Madison Brengle (Venezuela) Gabriela Paz	(United States) Danielle Collins (Italy) Camila Giorgi	(Croatia) Ajla Tomljanović (United States) Krista Hardebeck (Kazakhstan) Sesil Karatantcheva (United States) Lauren Davis
October 17	2011 Samsung Securities Cup; Seoul, South Korea; Hard $25,000; Singles – Doubles	(Chinese Taipei) Hsieh Su-wei; 6–1, 6–0	(Japan) Yurika Sema	(Japan) Aiko Nakamura (South Korea) Yoo Mi	(South Korea) Kim So-jung (South Korea) Kim Ji-young (China) Hu Yueyue (South Korea) Han Sung-hee
October 17	2011 Samsung Securities Cup; Seoul, South Korea; Hard $25,000; Singles – Doubles	(South Korea) Kang Seo-kyung (South Korea) Kim Na-ri; 5–7, 6–1, [10–7]	(South Korea) Kim Ji-young (South Korea) Yoo Mi	(Japan) Aiko Nakamura (South Korea) Yoo Mi	(South Korea) Kim So-jung (South Korea) Kim Ji-young (China) Hu Yueyue (South Korea) Han Sung-hee
October 17	2011 Gosen Cup; Makinohara, Shizuoka, Japan; Carpet $25,000; Singles – Doubles	(Czech Republic) Karolína Plíšková; 6–7^{(5–7)}, 6–2, 6–0	(Japan) Erika Sema	(Japan) Junri Namigata (Japan) Aki Yamasoto	(Japan) Chinami Ogi (Japan) Shuko Aoyama (China) Wang Qiang (Japan) Misa Eguchi
October 17	2011 Gosen Cup; Makinohara, Shizuoka, Japan; Carpet $25,000; Singles – Doubles	(Japan) Shuko Aoyama (Japan) Kotomi Takahata; 6–2, 7–5	(Japan) Junri Namigata (Japan) Akiko Yonemura	(Japan) Junri Namigata (Japan) Aki Yamasoto	(Japan) Chinami Ogi (Japan) Shuko Aoyama (China) Wang Qiang (Japan) Misa Eguchi
October 17	2011 Governor's Cup (1); Lagos, Nigeria; Hard $25,000; Singles – Doubles	(Ukraine) Elina Svitolina; 6–4, 6–3	(Croatia) Donna Vekić	(Russia) Nina Bratchikova (Italy) Anna Floris	(Montenegro) Danka Kovinić (South Africa) Natasha Fourouclas (Switzerland) Conny Perrin (United States) Sachia Vickery
October 17	2011 Governor's Cup (1); Lagos, Nigeria; Hard $25,000; Singles – Doubles	(Russia) Nina Bratchikova (Austria) Melanie Klaffner; 7–5, 5–7, [10–6]	(Slovenia) Tadeja Majerič (Bulgaria) Aleksandrina Naydenova	(Russia) Nina Bratchikova (Italy) Anna Floris	(Montenegro) Danka Kovinić (South Africa) Natasha Fourouclas (Switzerland) Conny Perrin (United States) Sachia Vickery
October 17	2011 AEGON GB Pro-Series Glasgow; Glasgow, United Kingdom; Hard $25,000; Singles – Doubles	(France) Claire Feuerstein; 6–3, 6–1	(Austria) Yvonne Meusburger	(United Kingdom) Tara Moore (France) Kristina Mladenovic	(Slovakia) Kristína Kučová (Poland) Marta Domachowska (Liechtenstein) Stephanie Vogt (Romania) Raluca Olaru
October 17	2011 AEGON GB Pro-Series Glasgow; Glasgow, United Kingdom; Hard $25,000; Singles – Doubles	(Finland) Emma Laine (France) Kristina Mladenovic; 6–2, 6–4	(Austria) Yvonne Meusburger (Liechtenstein) Stephanie Vogt	(United Kingdom) Tara Moore (France) Kristina Mladenovic	(Slovakia) Kristína Kučová (Poland) Marta Domachowska (Liechtenstein) Stephanie Vogt (Romania) Raluca Olaru
October 17	2011 Internacionales de Andalucía Femeninos; Seville, Spain; Clay $25,000; Singles – Doubles	(Hungary) Réka-Luca Jani; 2–6, 6–3, 6–3	(Spain) Estrella Cabeza Candela	(Spain) Eva Fernández Brugués (Spain) Lara Arruabarrena	(Spain) Inés Ferrer Suárez (Georgia (country)) Margalita Chakhnashvili (Spain) Garbiñe Muguruza (Romania) Elena Bogdan
October 17	2011 Internacionales de Andalucía Femeninos; Seville, Spain; Clay $25,000; Singles – Doubles	(Spain) Lara Arruabarrena (Spain) Estrella Cabeza Candela; 6–4, 6–4	(Spain) Leticia Costas (Spain) Inés Ferrer Suárez	(Spain) Eva Fernández Brugués (Spain) Lara Arruabarrena	(Spain) Inés Ferrer Suárez (Georgia (country)) Margalita Chakhnashvili (Spain) Garbiñe Muguruza (Romania) Elena Bogdan
October 17	Dubrovnik, Croatia; Clay $10,000; Singles draw – Doubles draw	(Serbia) Natalija Kostić; 7–6^{(7–2)}, ret.	(France) Estelle Guisard	(Russia) Natalia Ryzhonkova (Croatia) Iva Mekovec	(Slovakia) Karin Morgošová (Croatia) Tena Lukas (Croatia) Indire Akiki (Czech Republic) Martina Kubičíková
October 17	Dubrovnik, Croatia; Clay $10,000; Singles draw – Doubles draw	(France) Gracia Radovanovic (Germany) Dejana Raickovic; 6–1, 7–6^{(7–5)}	(Slovakia) Vivien Juhászová (Czech Republic) Martina Kubičíková	(Russia) Natalia Ryzhonkova (Croatia) Iva Mekovec	(Slovakia) Karin Morgošová (Croatia) Tena Lukas (Croatia) Indire Akiki (Czech Republic) Martina Kubičíková
October 17	Antalya, Turkey; Clay $10,000; Singles draw – Doubles draw	(Romania) Diana Enache; 6–4, 6–2	(Germany) Anna-Lena Friedsam	(Georgia (country)) Sofia Kvatsabaia (Romania) Laura-Ioana Andrei	(Germany) Jasmin Steinherr (Georgia (country)) Ekaterine Gorgodze (Germany) Christina Shakovets (Russia) Ksenia Kirillova
October 17	Antalya, Turkey; Clay $10,000; Singles draw – Doubles draw	(Georgia (country)) Sofia Kvatsabaia (Ukraine) Maryna Zanevska; 6–4, 6–1	(Romania) Diana Enache (Netherlands) Daniëlle Harmsen	(Georgia (country)) Sofia Kvatsabaia (Romania) Laura-Ioana Andrei	(Germany) Jasmin Steinherr (Georgia (country)) Ekaterine Gorgodze (Germany) Christina Shakovets (Russia) Ksenia Kirillova
October 17	Annaba, Algeria; Clay $10,000; Singles draw – Doubles draw	(Germany) Alina Wessel; 6–3, 6–1	(Italy) Constanza Mecchi	(France) Amandine Cazeaux (Algeria) Yassamine Boudjadi	(Italy) Linda Mair (Spain) Marta Morga Alonso (Tunisia) Sonia Daggou (Austria) Kerstin Peckl
October 17	Annaba, Algeria; Clay $10,000; Singles draw – Doubles draw	(France) Amandine Cazeaux (Germany) Alina Wessel; 6–4, 6–3	(Austria) Stephanie Hirsch (Italy) Linda Mair	(France) Amandine Cazeaux (Algeria) Yassamine Boudjadi	(Italy) Linda Mair (Spain) Marta Morga Alonso (Tunisia) Sonia Daggou (Austria) Kerstin Peckl
October 17	Montego Bay, Jamaica; Hard $10,000; Singles draw – Doubles draw	(Slovakia) Zuzana Zlochová; 6–4, 6–3	(United States) Anamika Bhargava	(Czech Republic) Tereza Hladíková (Czech Republic) Kateřina Kramperová	(United States) Brittany Augustine (Slovenia) Jelena Durišić (Italy) Federica Grazioso (Austria) Jeannine Prentner
October 17	Montego Bay, Jamaica; Hard $10,000; Singles draw – Doubles draw	(Czech Republic) Nikola Hübnerová (Slovakia) Zuzana Zlochová; 6–4, 6–4	(United Kingdom) Nicola George (Czech Republic) Kateřina Kramperová	(Czech Republic) Tereza Hladíková (Czech Republic) Kateřina Kramperová	(United States) Brittany Augustine (Slovenia) Jelena Durišić (Italy) Federica Grazioso (Austria) Jeannine Prentner
October 17	Almaty, Kazakhstan; Hard $10,000; Singles draw – Doubles draw	(Russia) Alexandra Artamonova; 6–4, 2–6, 6–3	(Kyrgyzstan) Bermet Duvanaeva	(Kazakhstan) Anna Danilina (Kazakhstan) Zalina Khairudinova	(Uzbekistan) Vlada Ekshibarova (Russia) Anna Smolina (Russia) Polina Rodionova (Russia) Ekaterina Yashina
October 17	Almaty, Kazakhstan; Hard $10,000; Singles draw – Doubles draw	(Kazakhstan) Anna Danilina (Kazakhstan) Kamila Kerimbayeva; 6–3, 6–1	(Czech Republic) Nikola Fraňková (Kazakhstan) Zalina Khairudinova	(Kazakhstan) Anna Danilina (Kazakhstan) Zalina Khairudinova	(Uzbekistan) Vlada Ekshibarova (Russia) Anna Smolina (Russia) Polina Rodionova (Russia) Ekaterina Yashina
October 17	Goiânia, Brazil; Clay $10,000; Singles draw – Doubles draw	(Brazil) Maria Fernanda Alves; 6–2, 6–4	(Argentina) Carla Lucero	(Brazil) Paula Cristina Gonçalves (Argentina) Carolina Zeballos	(Argentina) Guadalupe Pérez Rojas (Brazil) Flávia Dechandt Araújo (Brazil) Gabriela Cé (Brazil) Karina Venditti
October 17	Goiânia, Brazil; Clay $10,000; Singles draw – Doubles draw	(Paraguay) Jazmin Britos (Argentina) Carla Lucero; 0–6, 6–4, [10–6]	(Brazil) Maria Fernanda Alves (Brazil) Gabriela Cé	(Brazil) Paula Cristina Gonçalves (Argentina) Carolina Zeballos	(Argentina) Guadalupe Pérez Rojas (Brazil) Flávia Dechandt Araújo (Brazil) Gabriela Cé (Brazil) Karina Venditti
October 24	2011 Internationaux Féminins de la Vienne; Poitiers, France; Hard $100,000; Singles – Doubles	(Japan) Kimiko Date-Krumm; 7–6^{(7–3)}, 6–4	(United Kingdom) Elena Baltacha	(France) Irena Pavlovic (Russia) Regina Kulikova	(Romania) Mădălina Gojnea (Poland) Magda Linette (Russia) Alexandra Panova (Georgia (country)) Anna Tatishvili
October 24	2011 Internationaux Féminins de la Vienne; Poitiers, France; Hard $100,000; Singles – Doubles	(France) Alizé Cornet (France) Virginie Razzano; 6–3, 6–2	(Russia) Maria Kondratieva (France) Sophie Lefèvre	(France) Irena Pavlovic (Russia) Regina Kulikova	(Romania) Mădălina Gojnea (Poland) Magda Linette (Russia) Alexandra Panova (Georgia (country)) Anna Tatishvili
October 24	2011 AEGON GB Pro-Series Barnstaple; Barnstaple, United Kingdom; Hard $75,000; Singles – Doubles	(United Kingdom) Anne Keothavong; 6–1, 6–3	(Poland) Marta Domachowska	(Germany) Mona Barthel (Russia) Ekaterina Bychkova	(Netherlands) Michaëlla Krajicek (Switzerland) Stefanie Vögele (Portugal) Maria João Koehler (United Kingdom) Laura Robson
October 24	2011 AEGON GB Pro-Series Barnstaple; Barnstaple, United Kingdom; Hard $75,000; Singles – Doubles	(Czech Republic) Eva Birnerová (United Kingdom) Anne Keothavong; 7–5, 6–1	(Austria) Sandra Klemenschits (Germany) Tatjana Malek	(Germany) Mona Barthel (Russia) Ekaterina Bychkova	(Netherlands) Michaëlla Krajicek (Switzerland) Stefanie Vögele (Portugal) Maria João Koehler (United Kingdom) Laura Robson
October 24	2011 National Bank Challenger Saguenay; Saguenay, Quebec, Canada; Hard $50,000; Singles – Doubles	(Hungary) Tímea Babos; 7–6^{(9–7)}, 6–3	(United States) Julia Boserup	(Croatia) Mirjana Lučić (United States) Alexandra Stevenson	(Switzerland) Amra Sadiković (Ukraine) Irina Buryachok (Canada) Erin Routliffe (Canada) Sharon Fichman
October 24	2011 National Bank Challenger Saguenay; Saguenay, Quebec, Canada; Hard $50,000; Singles – Doubles	(Hungary) Tímea Babos (United States) Jessica Pegula; 6–4, 6–3	(Canada) Gabriela Dabrowski (Canada) Marie-Ève Pelletier	(Croatia) Mirjana Lučić (United States) Alexandra Stevenson	(Switzerland) Amra Sadiković (Ukraine) Irina Buryachok (Canada) Erin Routliffe (Canada) Sharon Fichman
October 24	Bayamón, Puerto Rico; Hard $25,000; Singles draw – Doubles draw	(Portugal) Michelle Larcher de Brito; 6–3, 6–2	(Puerto Rico) Monica Puig	(Colombia) Catalina Castaño (Russia) Olga Puchkova	(Croatia) Ajla Tomljanović (United States) Madison Brengle (Argentina) Florencia Molinero (Venezuela) Gabriela Paz
October 24	Bayamón, Puerto Rico; Hard $25,000; Singles draw – Doubles draw	(South Africa) Chanel Simmonds (Croatia) Ajla Tomljanović; 6–3, 6–1	(United States) Victoria Duval (United States) Alexandra Kiick	(Colombia) Catalina Castaño (Russia) Olga Puchkova	(Croatia) Ajla Tomljanović (United States) Madison Brengle (Argentina) Florencia Molinero (Venezuela) Gabriela Paz
October 24	2011 Governor's Cup (2); Lagos, Nigeria; Hard $25,000; Singles – Doubles	(Belgium) Tamaryn Hendler; 6–4, 7–5	(Croatia) Donna Vekić	(Slovenia) Dalila Jakupovič (Ukraine) Elina Svitolina	(Austria) Melanie Klaffner (Switzerland) Conny Perrin (Slovenia) Tadeja Majerič (Russia) Ksenia Lykina
October 24	2011 Governor's Cup (2); Lagos, Nigeria; Hard $25,000; Singles – Doubles	(Austria) Melanie Klaffner (Romania) Ágnes Szatmári; 6–0, 6–7^{(1–7)}, [10–5]	(Montenegro) Danka Kovinić (Ukraine) Elina Svitolina	(Slovenia) Dalila Jakupovič (Ukraine) Elina Svitolina	(Austria) Melanie Klaffner (Switzerland) Conny Perrin (Slovenia) Tadeja Majerič (Russia) Ksenia Lykina
October 24	2011 Tokyu Harvest Cup; Hamanako, Japan; Carpet $25,000; Singles – Doubles	(Czech Republic) Karolína Plíšková; 6–2, 7–6^{(7–4)}	(Japan) Junri Namigata	(Japan) Mai Minokoshi (Japan) Kanae Hisami	(Japan) Akiko Omae (Japan) Erika Takao (Japan) Shiho Akita (Czech Republic) Kristýna Plíšková
October 24	2011 Tokyu Harvest Cup; Hamanako, Japan; Carpet $25,000; Singles – Doubles	(Japan) Natsumi Hamamura (Japan) Ayumi Oka; 6–3, 6–3	(Vietnam) Huynh Phuong Dai Trang (Thailand) Varatchaya Wongteanchai	(Japan) Mai Minokoshi (Japan) Kanae Hisami	(Japan) Akiko Omae (Japan) Erika Takao (Japan) Shiho Akita (Czech Republic) Kristýna Plíšková
October 24	2011 Freddie Krivine Women's Tournament; Netanya, Israel; Hard $25,000; Singles – Doubles	(Germany) Dinah Pfizenmaier; 7–6^{(7–5)}, 4–6, 6–1	(Turkey) Çağla Büyükakçay	(Poland) Justyna Jegiołka (Israel) Julia Glushko	(Turkey) Pemra Özgen (Israel) Deniz Khazaniuk (Israel) Keren Shlomo (Czech Republic) Nikola Fraňková
October 24	2011 Freddie Krivine Women's Tournament; Netanya, Israel; Hard $25,000; Singles – Doubles	(Turkey) Çağla Büyükakçay (Turkey) Pemra Özgen; 7–5, 6–3	(Italy) Nicole Clerico (Israel) Julia Glushko	(Poland) Justyna Jegiołka (Israel) Julia Glushko	(Turkey) Pemra Özgen (Israel) Deniz Khazaniuk (Israel) Keren Shlomo (Czech Republic) Nikola Fraňková
October 24	Dubrovnik, Croatia; Clay $10,000; Singles draw – Doubles draw	(Italy) Martina Caregaro; 6–3, 6–3	(Russia) Victoria Kan	(Germany) Dejana Raickovic (Croatia) Karla Popović	(Russia) Maria Mokh (Slovenia) Tjaša Šrimpf (Czech Republic) Barbora Krejčíková (Portugal) Margarida Moura
October 24	Dubrovnik, Croatia; Clay $10,000; Singles draw – Doubles draw	(Russia) Victoria Kan (Czech Republic) Barbora Krejčíková; 7–6^{(7–3)}< 6–0	(Czech Republic) Martina Kubičíková (Bulgaria) Dalia Zafirova	(Germany) Dejana Raickovic (Croatia) Karla Popović	(Russia) Maria Mokh (Slovenia) Tjaša Šrimpf (Czech Republic) Barbora Krejčíková (Portugal) Margarida Moura
October 24	Stockholm, Sweden; Hard $10,000; Singles draw – Doubles draw	(Estonia) Anett Kontaveit; 6–4, 6–2	(Germany) Syna Kayser	(France) Clothilde de Bernardi (Italy) Alice Moroni	(France) Marion Gaud (Netherlands) Lisanne van Riet (United Kingdom) Eleanor Dean (Netherlands) Quirine Lemoine
October 24	Stockholm, Sweden; Hard $10,000; Singles draw – Doubles draw	(Netherlands) Quirine Lemoine (Netherlands) Lisanne van Riet; 7–5, 6–1	(United Kingdom) Eleanor Dean (Germany) Antonia Lottner	(France) Clothilde de Bernardi (Italy) Alice Moroni	(France) Marion Gaud (Netherlands) Lisanne van Riet (United Kingdom) Eleanor Dean (Netherlands) Quirine Lemoine
October 24	Antalya, Turkey; Clay $10,000; Singles draw – Doubles draw	(Romania) Diana Enache; 6–1, 6–7^{(5–7)}, 6–4	(Ukraine) Maryna Zanevska	(Austria) Yvonne Neuwirth (Romania) Laura-Ioana Andrei	(Bulgaria) Viktoriya Tomova (Germany) Lena-Marie Hofmann (Georgia (country)) Ekaterine Gorgodze (Italy) Alice Balducci
October 24	Antalya, Turkey; Clay $10,000; Singles draw – Doubles draw	(Romania) Diana Enache (Netherlands) Daniëlle Harmsen; 6–0, 6–3	(Romania) Laura-Ioana Andrei (Romania) Camelia Hristea	(Austria) Yvonne Neuwirth (Romania) Laura-Ioana Andrei	(Bulgaria) Viktoriya Tomova (Germany) Lena-Marie Hofmann (Georgia (country)) Ekaterine Gorgodze (Italy) Alice Balducci
October 24	Montego Bay, Jamaica; Hard $10,000; Singles draw – Doubles draw	(Czech Republic) Kateřina Kramperová; 7–6^{(7–5)}, 2–6, 6–1	(Slovakia) Zuzana Zlochová	(Czech Republic) Tereza Hladíková (United States) Elizabeth Ferris	(Brazil) Eduarda Piai (Czech Republic) Simona Dobrá (United States) Noelle Hickey (United States) Anamika Bhargava
October 24	Montego Bay, Jamaica; Hard $10,000; Singles draw – Doubles draw	(United States) Jennifer Brady (Czech Republic) Nikola Hübnerová; 6–3, 6–1	(Mexico) Ximena Hermoso (Mexico) Ivette López	(Czech Republic) Tereza Hladíková (United States) Elizabeth Ferris	(Brazil) Eduarda Piai (Czech Republic) Simona Dobrá (United States) Noelle Hickey (United States) Anamika Bhargava
October 24	2011 Nyrstar Port Pirie Tennis International; Port Pirie, Australia; Hard $25,000; Singles – Doubles	(Australia) Olivia Rogowska; 6–3, 6–2	(Australia) Bojana Bobusic	(Japan) Erika Sema (Australia) Isabella Holland	(Australia) Monique Adamczak (United Kingdom) Emily Webley-Smith (Australia) Daniella Dominikovic (China) Tang Hao Chen
October 24	2011 Nyrstar Port Pirie Tennis International; Port Pirie, Australia; Hard $25,000; Singles – Doubles	(Australia) Isabella Holland (Australia) Sally Peers w/o	(Australia) Bojana Bobusic (Australia) Monique Adamczak	(Japan) Erika Sema (Australia) Isabella Holland	(Australia) Monique Adamczak (United Kingdom) Emily Webley-Smith (Australia) Daniella Dominikovic (China) Tang Hao Chen
October 24	Bogotá, Colombia; Clay $10,000; Singles draw – Doubles draw	(Peru) Patricia Kú Flores; 6–7^{(6–8)}, 7–5, 6–3	(Chile) Cecilia Costa Melgar	(Colombia) Karen Castiblanco (Peru) Ingrid Várgas Calvo	(United States) Libby Muma (Slovakia) Lenka Broošová (Venezuela) Gabriela Coglitore (Peru) Katherine Miranda Chang
October 24	Bogotá, Colombia; Clay $10,000; Singles draw – Doubles draw	(Peru) Patricia Kú Flores (Peru) Katherine Miranda Chang; 6–4, 7–5	(Chile) Cecilia Costa Melgar (Chile) Belén Ludueña	(Colombia) Karen Castiblanco (Peru) Ingrid Várgas Calvo	(United States) Libby Muma (Slovakia) Lenka Broošová (Venezuela) Gabriela Coglitore (Peru) Katherine Miranda Chang
October 24	Goiânia, Brazil; Clay $10,000; Singles draw – Doubles draw	(Brazil) Beatriz Haddad Maia; 6–2, 6–0	(Portugal) Bárbara Luz	(Brazil) Paula Cristina Gonçalves (Argentina) Carla Lucero	(Argentina) Carolina Zeballos (Brazil) Gabriela Cé (Brazil) Julianna Bacelar (Brazil) Karina Venditti
October 24	Goiânia, Brazil; Clay $10,000; Singles draw – Doubles draw	(Brazil) Paula Cristina Gonçalves (Brazil) Beatriz Haddad Maia; 6–4, 5–7, [12–10]	(Brazil) Flávia Dechandt Araújo (Brazil) Karina Venditti	(Brazil) Paula Cristina Gonçalves (Argentina) Carla Lucero	(Argentina) Carolina Zeballos (Brazil) Gabriela Cé (Brazil) Julianna Bacelar (Brazil) Karina Venditti
October 31	2011 OEC Taipei Ladies Open; Taipei, Taiwan; Hard $100,000+H; Singles – Doubles	(Japan) Ayumi Morita; 6–2, 6–2	(Japan) Kimiko Date-Krumm	(Chinese Taipei) Chang Kai-chen (Belarus) Olga Govortsova	(Kazakhstan) Yaroslava Shvedova (Japan) Misaki Doi (United States) Jill Craybas (Czech Republic) Karolína Plíšková
October 31	2011 OEC Taipei Ladies Open; Taipei, Taiwan; Hard $100,000+H; Singles – Doubles	(Chinese Taipei) Chan Yung-jan (China) Zheng Jie; 7–6^{(7–5)}, 5–7, [10–5]	(Czech Republic) Karolína Plíšková (Czech Republic) Kristýna Plíšková	(Chinese Taipei) Chang Kai-chen (Belarus) Olga Govortsova	(Kazakhstan) Yaroslava Shvedova (Japan) Misaki Doi (United States) Jill Craybas (Czech Republic) Karolína Plíšková
October 31	2011 Open GDF SUEZ Nantes Atlantique; Nantes, France; Hard $50,000+H; Singles – Doubles	(United States) Alison Riske; 6–1, 6–4	(France) Iryna Brémond	(France) Alizé Cornet (France) Claire Feuerstein	(Spain) Arantxa Parra Santonja (Russia) Valeria Savinykh (France) Stéphanie Foretz Gacon (United Kingdom) Heather Watson
October 31	2011 Open GDF SUEZ Nantes Atlantique; Nantes, France; Hard $50,000+H; Singles – Doubles	(France) Stéphanie Foretz Gacon (France) Kristina Mladenovic; 6–0, 6–4	(France) Julie Coin (Czech Republic) Eva Hrdinová	(France) Alizé Cornet (France) Claire Feuerstein	(Spain) Arantxa Parra Santonja (Russia) Valeria Savinykh (France) Stéphanie Foretz Gacon (United Kingdom) Heather Watson
October 31	2011 ITF Büschl Open; Ismaning, Germany; Carpet $50,000+H; Singles – Doubles	(United Kingdom) Anne Keothavong; 6–3, 1–6, 6–2	(Austria) Yvonne Meusburger	(Netherlands) Kiki Bertens (Germany) Dinah Pfizenmaier	(United Kingdom) Naomi Broady (Germany) Tatjana Malek (Germany) Annika Beck (Czech Republic) Eva Birnerová
October 31	2011 ITF Büschl Open; Ismaning, Germany; Carpet $50,000+H; Singles – Doubles	(Netherlands) Kiki Bertens (United Kingdom) Anne Keothavong; 6–3, 6–3	(Germany) Kristina Barrois (Austria) Yvonne Meusburger	(Netherlands) Kiki Bertens (Germany) Dinah Pfizenmaier	(United Kingdom) Naomi Broady (Germany) Tatjana Malek (Germany) Annika Beck (Czech Republic) Eva Birnerová
October 31	Grapevine, Texas, United States; Hard $50,000; Singles draw – Doubles draw	(Japan) Kurumi Nara; 1–6, 6–0, 6–3	(Kazakhstan) Sesil Karatantcheva	(Croatia) Ajla Tomljanović (United States) Madison Brengle	(Italy) Romina Oprandi (China) Zhang Shuai (United States) Gail Brodsky (United States) Chiara Scholl
October 31	Grapevine, Texas, United States; Hard $50,000; Singles draw – Doubles draw	(United States) Jamie Hampton (China) Zhang Shuai; 6–4, 6–0	(United States) Lindsay Lee-Waters (United States) Megan Moulton-Levy	(Croatia) Ajla Tomljanović (United States) Madison Brengle	(Italy) Romina Oprandi (China) Zhang Shuai (United States) Gail Brodsky (United States) Chiara Scholl
October 31	Istanbul, Turkey; Hard $25,000; Singles draw – Doubles draw	(Ukraine) Lesia Tsurenko; 6–1, 7–5	(Russia) Irina Khromacheva	(Russia) Marta Sirotkina (Portugal) Maria João Koehler	(Serbia) Doroteja Erić (Bulgaria) Isabella Shinikova (Georgia (country)) Sofia Shapatava (Croatia) Ana Vrljić
October 31	Istanbul, Turkey; Hard $25,000; Singles draw – Doubles draw	(Ukraine) Lyudmyla Kichenok (Ukraine) Nadiya Kichenok; 4–6, 6–1, [10–7]	(Bosnia and Herzegovina) Mervana Jugić-Salkić (Croatia) Ana Vrljić	(Russia) Marta Sirotkina (Portugal) Maria João Koehler	(Serbia) Doroteja Erić (Bulgaria) Isabella Shinikova (Georgia (country)) Sofia Shapatava (Croatia) Ana Vrljić
October 31	Minsk, Belarus; Carpet $10,000; Singles draw – Doubles draw	(Ukraine) Olga Ianchuk; 6–3, 4–6, 6–4	(Russia) Julia Valetova	(Belarus) Darya Lebesheva (Russia) Tatiana Kotelnikova	(Belarus) Lidziya Marozava (Belarus) Sviatlana Pirazhenka (Russia) Olga Doroshina (Russia) Polina Monova
October 31	Minsk, Belarus; Carpet $10,000; Singles draw – Doubles draw	(Russia) Polina Monova (Russia) Anna Smolina; 6–3, 6–4	(Ukraine) Olga Ianchuk (Belarus) Lidziya Marozava	(Belarus) Darya Lebesheva (Russia) Tatiana Kotelnikova	(Belarus) Lidziya Marozava (Belarus) Sviatlana Pirazhenka (Russia) Olga Doroshina (Russia) Polina Monova
October 31	Sunderland, United Kingdom; Hard $10,000; Singles draw – Doubles draw	(Belgium) Alison Van Uytvanck; 6–4, 6–1	(United Kingdom) Tara Moore	(France) Myrtille Georges (Czech Republic) Martina Borecká	(United Kingdom) Alicia Barnett (United Kingdom) Anna Fitzpatrick (Switzerland) Clelia Melena (France) Lou Brouleau
October 31	Sunderland, United Kingdom; Hard $10,000; Singles draw – Doubles draw	(Netherlands) Eva Wacanno (United States) Caitlin Whoriskey; 6–2, 4–6, [10–8]	(Czech Republic) Martina Borecká (Czech Republic) Petra Krejsová	(France) Myrtille Georges (Czech Republic) Martina Borecká	(United Kingdom) Alicia Barnett (United Kingdom) Anna Fitzpatrick (Switzerland) Clelia Melena (France) Lou Brouleau
October 31	Stockholm, Sweden; Hard $10,000; Singles draw – Doubles draw	(Germany) Antonia Lottner; 4–6, 6–4, 7–5	(Netherlands) Quirine Lemoine	(Italy) Alice Moroni (Germany) Julia Kimmelmann	(United Kingdom) Eleanor Dean (Republic of Ireland) Amy Bowtell (Sweden) Valeria Osadchenko (Poland) Sylwia Zagórska
October 31	Stockholm, Sweden; Hard $10,000; Singles draw – Doubles draw	(Netherlands) Ghislaine van Baal (Netherlands) Lisanne van Riet; 6–2, 6–7^{(5–7)}, [10–7]	(Denmark) Karen Barbat (Germany) Julia Kimmelmann	(Italy) Alice Moroni (Germany) Julia Kimmelmann	(United Kingdom) Eleanor Dean (Republic of Ireland) Amy Bowtell (Sweden) Valeria Osadchenko (Poland) Sylwia Zagórska
October 31	Antalya, Turkey; Clay $10,000; Singles draw – Doubles draw	(Serbia) Jovana Jakšić; 6–4, 6–2	(Ukraine) Ganna Poznikhirenko	(Romania) Laura-Ioana Andrei (Germany) Franziska Etzel	(Netherlands) Bernice van de Velde (Ukraine) Nadya Kolb (Russia) Natela Dzalamidze (Georgia (country)) Ekaterine Gorgodze
October 31	Antalya, Turkey; Clay $10,000; Singles draw – Doubles draw	(Hungary) Vaszilisza Bulgakova (Czech Republic) Martina Kubičíková; 7–6^{(7–3)}, 2–6, [12–10]	(Romania) Laura-Ioana Andrei (Romania) Raluca Elena Platon	(Romania) Laura-Ioana Andrei (Germany) Franziska Etzel	(Netherlands) Bernice van de Velde (Ukraine) Nadya Kolb (Russia) Natela Dzalamidze (Georgia (country)) Ekaterine Gorgodze
October 31	Kuching, Malaysia; Hard $10,000; Singles draw – Doubles draw	(Thailand) Luksika Kumkhum; 7–6^{(7–3)}, 6–3	(Thailand) Nungnadda Wannasuk	(China) Cai Xiwei (China) Lu Jiajing	(Thailand) Napatsakorn Sankaew (Indonesia) Grace Sari Ysidora (China) Zhu Ai Wen (China) Lu Jia Xiang
October 31	Kuching, Malaysia; Hard $10,000; Singles draw – Doubles draw	(Thailand) Luksika Kumkhum (Thailand) Nungnadda Wannasuk; 6–4, 6–3	(China) Lu Jiaxiang (China) Lu Jiajing	(China) Cai Xiwei (China) Lu Jiajing	(Thailand) Napatsakorn Sankaew (Indonesia) Grace Sari Ysidora (China) Zhu Ai Wen (China) Lu Jia Xiang
October 31	Asunción, Paraguay; Clay $10,000; Singles draw – Doubles draw	(Slovakia) Romana Tabak; 5–7, 7–6^{(9–7)}, 7–5	(Argentina) María Irigoyen	(Argentina) Mailen Auroux (Argentina) Victoria Bosio	(Argentina) Jordana Lujan (Argentina) Francesca Rescaldani (Argentina) Ornella Caron (Paraguay) Montserrat González
October 31	Asunción, Paraguay; Clay $10,000; Singles draw – Doubles draw	(Argentina) Mailen Auroux (Argentina) María Irigoyen; 6–3, 4–6, [10–5]	(Argentina) Tatiana Búa (Argentina) Luciana Sarmenti	(Argentina) Mailen Auroux (Argentina) Victoria Bosio	(Argentina) Jordana Lujan (Argentina) Francesca Rescaldani (Argentina) Ornella Caron (Paraguay) Montserrat González
October 31	Montego Bay, Jamaica; Hard $10,000; Singles draw – Doubles draw	(Czech Republic) Tereza Hladíková; 6–3, 7–5	(United States) Kelsey Laurente	(United States) Noelle Hickey (Mexico) Ximena Hermoso	(Mexico) Ana Sofía Sánchez (Belgium) Michaela Boev (United States) Elizabeth Ferris (Slovakia) Zuzana Zlochová
October 31	Montego Bay, Jamaica; Hard $10,000; Singles draw – Doubles draw	(United States) Chalena Scholl (Slovakia) Zuzana Zlochová; 6–2, 6–2	(Italy) Federica Grazioso (Czech Republic) Kateřina Kramperová	(United States) Noelle Hickey (Mexico) Ximena Hermoso	(Mexico) Ana Sofía Sánchez (Belgium) Michaela Boev (United States) Elizabeth Ferris (Slovakia) Zuzana Zlochová
October 31	2011 City of Mount Gambier Blue Lake Women's Classic; Mount Gambier, South Australia, Australia; Hard $25,000; Singles – Doubles	(Australia) Bojana Bobusic; 6–3, 6–2	(South Korea) Han Sung-hee	(Australia) Sally Peers (Australia) Isabella Holland	(Japan) Erika Sema (Russia) Arina Rodionova (New Zealand) Sacha Jones (United Kingdom) Melanie South
October 31	2011 City of Mount Gambier Blue Lake Women's Classic; Mount Gambier, South Australia, Australia; Hard $25,000; Singles – Doubles	(Australia) Stephanie Bengson (Australia) Tyra Calderwood w/o	(Australia) Isabella Holland (Australia) Sally Peers	(Australia) Sally Peers (Australia) Isabella Holland	(Japan) Erika Sema (Russia) Arina Rodionova (New Zealand) Sacha Jones (United Kingdom) Melanie South
October 31	Bogotá, Colombia; Clay $10,000; Singles draw – Doubles draw	(Colombia) Yuliana Lizarazo; 4–6, 7–5, 6–4	(Colombia) Karen Castiblanco	(Slovakia) Lenka Broošová (Colombia) María Paulina Pérez	(Peru) Katherine Miranda Chang (Peru) Patricia Kú Flores (Chile) Cecilia Costa Melgar (Slovakia) Martina Frantová
October 31	Bogotá, Colombia; Clay $10,000; Singles draw – Doubles draw	(Slovakia) Martina Frantová (United States) Libby Muma; 7–5, 6–1	(Slovakia) Lenka Broošová (United States) Kyra Wojcik	(Slovakia) Lenka Broošová (Colombia) María Paulina Pérez	(Peru) Katherine Miranda Chang (Peru) Patricia Kú Flores (Chile) Cecilia Costa Melgar (Slovakia) Martina Frantová
October 31	2011 Tevlin Women's Challenger; Toronto, Canada; Hard $50,000; Singles – Doubles	(Switzerland) Amra Sadiković; 6–4, 6–2	(Canada) Gabriela Dabrowski	(Slovenia) Petra Rampre (Hungary) Tímea Babos	(Slovenia) Andreja Klepač (United States) Alexandra Mueller (Canada) Eugenie Bouchard (Luxembourg) Mandy Minella
October 31	2011 Tevlin Women's Challenger; Toronto, Canada; Hard $50,000; Singles – Doubles	(Canada) Gabriela Dabrowski (Canada) Marie-Ève Pelletier; 7–5, 6–7^{(5–7)}, [10–4]	(Hungary) Tímea Babos (United States) Jessica Pegula	(Slovenia) Petra Rampre (Hungary) Tímea Babos	(Slovenia) Andreja Klepač (United States) Alexandra Mueller (Canada) Eugenie Bouchard (Luxembourg) Mandy Minella

== November ==
Week of	Tournament	Winner	Runners-up	Semifinalists	Quarterfinalists
November 7	2011 Goldwater Women's Tennis Classic; Phoenix, Arizona, United States; Hard $75,000; Singles – Doubles	(Kazakhstan) Sesil Karatantcheva; 6–1, 7–5	(Portugal) Michelle Larcher de Brito	(Luxembourg) Mandy Minella (United States) Madison Keys	(Russia) Olga Puchkova (Slovenia) Petra Rampre (United States) Grace Min (Puerto Rico) Monica Puig
November 7	2011 Goldwater Women's Tennis Classic; Phoenix, Arizona, United States; Hard $75,000; Singles – Doubles	(United States) Jamie Hampton (Croatia) Ajla Tomljanović; 3–6, 6–3, [10–6]	(United States) Maria Sanchez (United States) Yasmin Schnack	(Luxembourg) Mandy Minella (United States) Madison Keys	(Russia) Olga Puchkova (Slovenia) Petra Rampre (United States) Grace Min (Puerto Rico) Monica Puig
November 7	2011 Hart Open; Opole, Poland; Carpet $25,000; Singles – Doubles	(Croatia) Ana Vrljić; 6–3, 2–6, 7–6^{(7–4)}	(Poland) Paula Kania	(Poland) Magda Linette (Czech Republic) Sandra Záhlavová	(Belarus) Polina Pekhova (Slovakia) Kristína Kučová (Ukraine) Tetyana Arefyeva (United Kingdom) Naomi Broady
November 7	2011 Hart Open; Opole, Poland; Carpet $25,000; Singles – Doubles	(United Kingdom) Naomi Broady (France) Kristina Mladenovic; 7–6^{(7–5)}, 6–4	(Poland) Paula Kania (Poland) Magda Linette	(Poland) Magda Linette (Czech Republic) Sandra Záhlavová	(Belarus) Polina Pekhova (Slovakia) Kristína Kučová (Ukraine) Tetyana Arefyeva (United Kingdom) Naomi Broady
November 7	2011 AEGON Pro-Series Loughborough; Loughborough, United Kingdom; Hard $10,000; Singles – Doubles	(United Kingdom) Tara Moore; 7–6^{(7–5)}, 5–7, 6–4	(France) Myrtille Georges	(Republic of Ireland) Amy Bowtell (Czech Republic) Martina Borecká	(France) Lou Brouleau (United Kingdom) Lucy Brown (France) Anaève Pain (France) Elixane Lechemia
November 7	2011 AEGON Pro-Series Loughborough; Loughborough, United Kingdom; Hard $10,000; Singles – Doubles	(United Kingdom) Tara Moore (United Kingdom) Francesca Stephenson; 3–6, 6–2, [10–3]	(Denmark) Malou Ejdesgaard (United Kingdom) Amanda Elliott	(Republic of Ireland) Amy Bowtell (Czech Republic) Martina Borecká	(France) Lou Brouleau (United Kingdom) Lucy Brown (France) Anaève Pain (France) Elixane Lechemia
November 7	Antalya, Turkey; Clay $10,000; Singles draw – Doubles draw	(Serbia) Natalija Kostić; 6–4, 2–6, 6–2	(Romania) Laura-Ioana Andrei	(Germany) Nicola Geuer (Italy) Evelyn Mayr	(Hungary) Vaszilisza Bulgakova (Germany) Franziska Etzel (Romania) Raluca Elena Platon (Ukraine) Ganna Poznikhirenko
November 7	Antalya, Turkey; Clay $10,000; Singles draw – Doubles draw	(Romania) Laura-Ioana Andrei (Romania) Raluca Elena Platon; 6–4, 6–1	(Hungary) Vaszilisza Bulgakova (Russia) Elena Kulikova	(Germany) Nicola Geuer (Italy) Evelyn Mayr	(Hungary) Vaszilisza Bulgakova (Germany) Franziska Etzel (Romania) Raluca Elena Platon (Ukraine) Ganna Poznikhirenko
November 7	Manila, The Philippines; Hard $10,000; Singles draw – Doubles draw	(Thailand) Peangtarn Plipuech; 6–3, 6–3	(China) Lu Jia Xiang	(Thailand) Luksika Kumkhum (Germany) Katharina Lehnert	(India) Rishika Sunkara (South Korea) Kim Hae-sung (United States) Sylvia Krywacz (China) Lu Jiajing
November 7	Manila, The Philippines; Hard $10,000; Singles draw – Doubles draw	(Thailand) Luksika Kumkhum (Thailand) Peangtarn Plipuech; 6–3, 6–0	(China) Zhao Yijing (China) Zheng Junyi	(Thailand) Luksika Kumkhum (Germany) Katharina Lehnert	(India) Rishika Sunkara (South Korea) Kim Hae-sung (United States) Sylvia Krywacz (China) Lu Jiajing
November 7	Montego Bay, Jamaica; Hard $10,000; Singles draw – Doubles draw	(United States) Chalena Scholl; 6–2, 6–2	(Czech Republic) Kateřina Kramperová	(United States) Elizabeth Ferris (Spain) Isabela Rapisarda Calvo	(Mexico) Ximena Hermoso (Trinidad and Tobago) Yolande Leacock (Mexico) Ana Sofía Sánchez (Belgium) Michaela Boev
November 7	Montego Bay, Jamaica; Hard $10,000; Singles draw – Doubles draw	(United States) Kelsey Laurente (United States) Chanelle van Nguyen; 6–2, 6–4	(United States) Elizabeth Ferris (United States) Chalena Scholl	(United States) Elizabeth Ferris (Spain) Isabela Rapisarda Calvo	(Mexico) Ximena Hermoso (Trinidad and Tobago) Yolande Leacock (Mexico) Ana Sofía Sánchez (Belgium) Michaela Boev
November 7	Medellín, Colombia; Clay $10,000; Singles draw – Doubles draw	(Slovakia) Lenka Broošová; 6–3, 6–2	(United States) Nadia Echeverria Alam	(Peru) Katherine Miranda Chang (Peru) Ingrid Várgas Calvo	(Chile) Belén Ludueña (United States) Deborah Suarez (Ecuador) Nicole Martínez (Slovakia) Martina Frantová
November 7	Medellín, Colombia; Clay $10,000; Singles draw – Doubles draw	(Peru) Patricia Kú Flores (Peru) Katherine Miranda Chang; 6–4, 7–6^{(7–4)}	(Slovakia) Martina Frantová (United States) Libby Muma	(Peru) Katherine Miranda Chang (Peru) Ingrid Várgas Calvo	(Chile) Belén Ludueña (United States) Deborah Suarez (Ecuador) Nicole Martínez (Slovakia) Martina Frantová
November 7	Asunción, Paraguay; Clay $10,000; Singles draw – Doubles draw	(Slovakia) Romana Tabak; 6–7^{(4–7)}, 6–4, 6–4	(Austria) Tina Schiechtl	(Brazil) Beatriz Haddad Maia (Argentina) Mailen Auroux	(Norway) Ulrikke Eikeri (Hungary) Csilla Argyelán (Argentina) Vanesa Furlanetto (Germany) Karolina Nowak
November 7	Asunción, Paraguay; Clay $10,000; Singles draw – Doubles draw	(Argentina) Mailen Auroux (Argentina) María Irigoyen; 6–1, 2–6, [10–5]	(Norway) Ulrikke Eikeri (Venezuela) Andrea Gámiz	(Brazil) Beatriz Haddad Maia (Argentina) Mailen Auroux	(Norway) Ulrikke Eikeri (Hungary) Csilla Argyelán (Argentina) Vanesa Furlanetto (Germany) Karolina Nowak
November 7	Salvador, Bahia, Brazil; Hard $10,000; Singles draw – Doubles draw	(Ecuador) Doménica González; 3–6, 6–3, 6–2	(Brazil) Gabriela Cé	(Brazil) Julianna Bacelar (Brazil) Carla Forte	(Brazil) Karina Venditti (Brazil) Eduarda Piai (Brazil) Sabrina Dos Reis (Portugal) Bárbara Luz
November 7	Salvador, Bahia, Brazil; Hard $10,000; Singles draw – Doubles draw	(Brazil) Marcela Bueno (Brazil) Flávia Guimarães Bueno; 7–6^{(7–2)}, 3–1, ret.	(Portugal) Bárbara Luz (Brazil) Karina Venditti	(Brazil) Julianna Bacelar (Brazil) Carla Forte	(Brazil) Karina Venditti (Brazil) Eduarda Piai (Brazil) Sabrina Dos Reis (Portugal) Bárbara Luz
November 7	Monastir, Tunisia; Hard $10,000; Singles draw – Doubles draw	(Bulgaria) Viktoriya Tomova; 3–1, ret.	(Slovakia) Klaudia Boczová	(France) Estelle Guisard (United States) Nicole Melichar	(Germany) Alina Wessel (Italy) Giulia Pasini (Serbia) Saška Gavrilovska (Russia) Margarita Lazareva
November 7	Monastir, Tunisia; Hard $10,000; Singles draw – Doubles draw	(Bosnia and Herzegovina) Anita Husarić (Bulgaria) Viktoriya Tomova; 6–3, 5–7, [10–5]	(Ukraine) Anastasia Kharchenko (United States) Nicole Melichar	(France) Estelle Guisard (United States) Nicole Melichar	(Germany) Alina Wessel (Italy) Giulia Pasini (Serbia) Saška Gavrilovska (Russia) Margarita Lazareva
November 7	2011 Femenino Ciudad de Benicarló; Benicarló, Spain; Clay $25,000; Singles – Doubles	(Spain) Garbiñe Muguruza; 7–6^{(7–3)}, 6–7^{(4–7)}, 6–3	(Bulgaria) Elitsa Kostova	(Spain) Lara Arruabarrena Vecino (Italy) Anna Floris	(Spain) Leticia Costas (Spain) Inés Ferrer Suárez (Italy) Annalisa Bona (Peru) Bianca Botto
November 7	2011 Femenino Ciudad de Benicarló; Benicarló, Spain; Clay $25,000; Singles – Doubles	(Spain) Inés Ferrer Suárez (Netherlands) Richèl Hogenkamp; 7–6^{(8–6)}, 6–4	(Russia) Ekaterina Ivanova (Bulgaria) Aleksandrina Naydenova	(Spain) Lara Arruabarrena Vecino (Italy) Anna Floris	(Spain) Leticia Costas (Spain) Inés Ferrer Suárez (Italy) Annalisa Bona (Peru) Bianca Botto
November 14	2011 Slovak Open; Bratislava, Slovakia; Hard $25,000; Singles – Doubles	(Ukraine) Lesia Tsurenko; 7–5, 6–3	(Czech Republic) Karolína Plíšková	(Slovakia) Lenka Juríková (Hungary) Tímea Babos	(Israel) Julia Glushko (Netherlands) Richèl Hogenkamp (Russia) Daria Gavrilova (Ukraine) Lyudmyla Kichenok
November 14	2011 Slovak Open; Bratislava, Slovakia; Hard $25,000; Singles – Doubles	(United Kingdom) Naomi Broady (France) Kristina Mladenovic; 5–7, 6–4, [10–2]	(Czech Republic) Karolína Plíšková (Czech Republic) Kristýna Plíšková	(Slovakia) Lenka Juríková (Hungary) Tímea Babos	(Israel) Julia Glushko (Netherlands) Richèl Hogenkamp (Russia) Daria Gavrilova (Ukraine) Lyudmyla Kichenok
November 14	2011 Latrobe City Tennis International; Traralgon, Australia; Hard $25,000; Singles – Doubles	(Australia) Casey Dellacqua; 7–5, 7–6^{(8–6)}	(New Zealand) Sacha Jones	(Australia) Isabella Holland (Australia) Olivia Rogowska	(Australia) Monique Adamczak (United Kingdom) Anna Fitzpatrick (Australia) Viktorija Rajicic (United Kingdom) Samantha Murray
November 14	2011 Latrobe City Tennis International; Traralgon, Australia; Hard $25,000; Singles – Doubles	(Australia) Stephanie Bengson (Australia) Tyra Calderwood; 6–7^{(2–7)}, 6–1, [10–8]	(Australia) Monique Adamczak (Australia) Bojana Bobusic	(Australia) Isabella Holland (Australia) Olivia Rogowska	(Australia) Monique Adamczak (United Kingdom) Anna Fitzpatrick (Australia) Viktorija Rajicic (United Kingdom) Samantha Murray
November 14	2011 Copa Itaú; Asunción, Paraguay; Clay $25,000; Singles – Doubles	(Slovakia) Romana Tabak; 6–1, 6–0	(Argentina) Florencia Molinero	(Croatia) Tereza Mrdeža (Paraguay) Verónica Cepede Royg	(United States) Julia Cohen (Brazil) Teliana Pereira (Argentina) Vanesa Furlanetto (Argentina) María Irigoyen
November 14	2011 Copa Itaú; Asunción, Paraguay; Clay $25,000; Singles – Doubles	(United States) Julia Cohen (Croatia) Tereza Mrdeža; 6–3, 2–6, [10–5]	(Argentina) Mailen Auroux (Argentina) María Irigoyen	(Croatia) Tereza Mrdeža (Paraguay) Verónica Cepede Royg	(United States) Julia Cohen (Brazil) Teliana Pereira (Argentina) Vanesa Furlanetto (Argentina) María Irigoyen
November 14	Équerdreville, France; Hard $10,000; Singles draw – Doubles draw	(Ukraine) Maryna Zanevska; 6–4, 6–2	(Germany) Anna-Lena Friedsam	(Georgia (country)) Sofia Shapatava (Belgium) Alison Van Uytvanck	(France) Josepha Adam (Belgium) Elyne Boeykens (Poland) Patrycja Sanduska (Netherlands) Nicolette van Uitert
November 14	Équerdreville, France; Hard $10,000; Singles draw – Doubles draw	(Belgium) Elyna Boeykens (Netherlands) Eva Wacanno; 6–4, 6–4	(France) Elixane Lechémia (Croatia) Silvia Njirić	(Georgia (country)) Sofia Shapatava (Belgium) Alison Van Uytvanck	(France) Josepha Adam (Belgium) Elyne Boeykens (Poland) Patrycja Sanduska (Netherlands) Nicolette van Uitert
November 14	Concepción, Chile; Clay $10,000; Singles draw – Doubles draw	(Chile) Fernanda Brito; 6–3, 6–4	(Argentina) Carla Lucero	(Chile) Macarena Olivares López (Chile) Camila Silva	(Colombia) Mariajosé Cardona (Argentina) Nadia Podoroska (Venezuela) Gabriela Coglitore (Argentina) Carla Bruzzesi Avella
November 14	Concepción, Chile; Clay $10,000; Singles draw – Doubles draw	(Russia) Alina Mikheeva (Italy) Candelaria Sedano-Acosta; 3–6, 6–4, [10–3]	(Argentina) Carla Lucero (Argentina) Guadalupe Pérez Rojas	(Chile) Macarena Olivares López (Chile) Camila Silva	(Colombia) Mariajosé Cardona (Argentina) Nadia Podoroska (Venezuela) Gabriela Coglitore (Argentina) Carla Bruzzesi Avella
November 14	Manila, The Philippines; Hard $10,000; Singles draw – Doubles draw	(Thailand) Luksika Kumkhum; 4–6, 6–4, 6–2	(China) Zhao Yijing	(Japan) Yurina Koshino (China) Guo Lu	(Hong Kong) Chan Wing-yau (Chinese Taipei) Juan Ting-fei (China) Wen Xin (China) Yang Zi
November 14	Manila, The Philippines; Hard $10,000; Singles draw – Doubles draw	(Thailand) Napatsakorn Sankaew (Thailand) Varunya Wongteanchai; 6–1, 3–6, [10–6]	(Thailand) Luksika Kumkhum (Thailand) Peangtarn Plipuech	(Japan) Yurina Koshino (China) Guo Lu	(Hong Kong) Chan Wing-yau (Chinese Taipei) Juan Ting-fei (China) Wen Xin (China) Yang Zi
November 14	Monastir, Tunisia; Hard $10,000; Singles draw – Doubles draw	(France) Estelle Guisard; 6–3, 6–2	(Ukraine) Anastasia Kharchenko	(Serbia) Saška Gavrilovska (Italy) Marina Caregaro	(Russia) Ekaterina Yashina (Oman) Fatma Al Nabhani (Tunisia) Nour Abbès (France) Jessica Ginier
November 14	Monastir, Tunisia; Hard $10,000; Singles draw – Doubles draw	(Russia) Margarita Lazareva (Russia) Ekaterina Yashina; 6–3, 6–2	(Serbia) Saška Gavrilovska (Serbia) Andjela Novčić	(Serbia) Saška Gavrilovska (Italy) Marina Caregaro	(Russia) Ekaterina Yashina (Oman) Fatma Al Nabhani (Tunisia) Nour Abbès (France) Jessica Ginier
November 14	Vinaròs, Spain; Clay $10,000; Singles draw – Doubles draw	(Italy) Anastasia Grymalska; Walkover	(Peru) Bianca Botto	(Spain) María Teresa Torró Flor (Russia) Nanuli Pipiya	(Israel) Valeria Patiuk (Spain) Arabela Fernández Rabener (Italy) Carolina Pillot (Spain) Yvonne Cavallé Reimers
November 14	Vinaròs, Spain; Clay $10,000; Singles draw – Doubles draw	(Italy) Anastasia Grymalska (Russia) Eugeniya Pashkova; 6–3, 6–1	(United Kingdom) Amanda Carreras (Spain) Carolina Prats Millán	(Spain) María Teresa Torró Flor (Russia) Nanuli Pipiya	(Israel) Valeria Patiuk (Spain) Arabela Fernández Rabener (Italy) Carolina Pillot (Spain) Yvonne Cavallé Reimers
November 21	2011 Dunlop World Challenge; Toyota, Aichi, Japan; Carpet $75,000+H; Singles – Doubles	(Thailand) Tamarine Tanasugarn; 6–2, 7–5	(Japan) Kimiko Date-Krumm	(Netherlands) Michaëlla Krajicek (Chinese Taipei) Chan Yung-jan	(Thailand) Nudnida Luangnam (Slovenia) Tadeja Majerič (Slovakia) Zuzana Luknárová (Japan) Misaki Doi
November 21	2011 Dunlop World Challenge; Toyota, Aichi, Japan; Carpet $75,000+H; Singles – Doubles	(Japan) Makoto Ninomiya (Japan) Riko Sawayanagi w/o	(France) Caroline Garcia (Netherlands) Michaëlla Krajicek	(Netherlands) Michaëlla Krajicek (Chinese Taipei) Chan Yung-jan	(Thailand) Nudnida Luangnam (Slovenia) Tadeja Majerič (Slovakia) Zuzana Luknárová (Japan) Misaki Doi
November 21	2011 William Loud Bendigo International; Bendigo, Australia; Hard $25,000; Singles – Doubles	(Australia) Casey Dellacqua; 6–2, 6–2	(Australia) Isabella Holland	(Japan) Misa Eguchi (Australia) Olivia Rogowska	(China) Zhao Di (New Zealand) Sacha Jones (United Kingdom) Samantha Murray (Japan) Chiaki Okadaue
November 21	2011 William Loud Bendigo International; Bendigo, Australia; Hard $25,000; Singles – Doubles	(Australia) Stephanie Bengson (Australia) Tyra Calderwood; 2–6, 6–1, [10–5]	(United Kingdom) Samantha Murray (Australia) Storm Sanders	(Japan) Misa Eguchi (Australia) Olivia Rogowska	(China) Zhao Di (New Zealand) Sacha Jones (United Kingdom) Samantha Murray (Japan) Chiaki Okadaue
November 21	Rancagua, Chile; Clay $10,000; Singles draw – Doubles draw	(Austria) Tina Schiechtl; 6–3, 3–6, 6–0	(South Africa) Natasha Fourouclas	(Chile) Camila Silva (Chile) Cecilia Costa Melgar	(Chile) Daniela Seguel (Germany) Karolina Nowak (Israel) Ofri Lankri (Brazil) Carla Forte
November 21	Rancagua, Chile; Clay $10,000; Singles draw – Doubles draw	(Chile) Belén Ludueña (Chile) Daniela Seguel; 6–4, 4–6, [10–5]	(Brazil) Carla Forte (Brazil) Flávia Guimarães Bueno	(Chile) Camila Silva (Chile) Cecilia Costa Melgar	(Chile) Daniela Seguel (Germany) Karolina Nowak (Israel) Ofri Lankri (Brazil) Carla Forte
November 21	La Vall d'Uixó, Spain; Clay $10,000; Singles draw – Doubles draw	(Russia) Daria Salnikova; 5–7, 6–2, 6–1	(Spain) Pilar Domínguez López	(Spain) Yvonne Cavallé Reimers (Russia) Nanuli Pipiya	(Spain) Rocío de la Torre Sánchez (Spain) Miriam Civera Lima (Switzerland) Viktorija Golubic (Poland) Patrycja Sanduska
November 21	La Vall d'Uixó, Spain; Clay $10,000; Singles draw – Doubles draw	(Switzerland) Viktorija Golubic (Poland) Magdalena Kiszczyńska; 7–5, 3–6, [10–8]	(Spain) Yvonne Cavallé Reimers (Spain) Arabela Fernández Rabener	(Spain) Yvonne Cavallé Reimers (Russia) Nanuli Pipiya	(Spain) Rocío de la Torre Sánchez (Spain) Miriam Civera Lima (Switzerland) Viktorija Golubic (Poland) Patrycja Sanduska
November 21	Antalya, Turkey; Clay $10,000; Singles draw – Doubles draw	(Netherlands) Daniëlle Harmsen; 6–1, 6–2	(Russia) Julia Parasyuk	(Turkey) Hülya Esen (Romania) Diana Enache	(Ukraine) Nadya Kolb (Bulgaria) Martina Gledacheva (Georgia (country)) Ekaterine Gorgodze (Netherlands) Nicolette van Uitert
November 21	Antalya, Turkey; Clay $10,000; Singles draw – Doubles draw	(Romania) Diana Enache (Netherlands) Daniëlle Harmsen; 6–1, 6–3	(Slovenia) Dalila Jakupovič (Germany) Sarah-Rebecca Sekulic	(Turkey) Hülya Esen (Romania) Diana Enache	(Ukraine) Nadya Kolb (Bulgaria) Martina Gledacheva (Georgia (country)) Ekaterine Gorgodze (Netherlands) Nicolette van Uitert
November 21	2011 OrtoLääkärit Open; Helsinki, Finland; Hard $25,000; Singles – Doubles	(Hungary) Tímea Babos; 6–3, 6–1	(Slovakia) Jana Čepelová	(Estonia) Kaia Kanepi (Germany) Annika Beck	(Russia) Daria Gavrilova (Russia) Alexandra Artamonova (Croatia) Ana Vrljić (Switzerland) Amra Sadiković
November 21	2011 OrtoLääkärit Open; Helsinki, Finland; Hard $25,000; Singles – Doubles	(Slovakia) Janette Husárová (Finland) Emma Laine; 5–7, 7–5, [11–9]	(Hungary) Tímea Babos (Ukraine) Irina Buryachok	(Estonia) Kaia Kanepi (Germany) Annika Beck	(Russia) Daria Gavrilova (Russia) Alexandra Artamonova (Croatia) Ana Vrljić (Switzerland) Amra Sadiković
November 21	La Marsa, Tunisia; Clay $10,000; Singles draw – Doubles draw	(Italy) Anastasia Grymalska; 7–5, 2–6, 6–3	(Italy) Martina Caregaro	(Ukraine) Anastasia Kharchenko (France) Estelle Guisard	(France) Alice Tisset (Tunisia) Sonia Daggou (Russia) Diana Isaeva (Italy) Agnese Zucchini
November 21	La Marsa, Tunisia; Clay $10,000; Singles draw – Doubles draw	(Belgium) Désirée Bastianon (Belgium) Steffi Distelmans; 7–5, 6–2	(Russia) Diana Isaeva (Russia) Margarita Lazareva	(Ukraine) Anastasia Kharchenko (France) Estelle Guisard	(France) Alice Tisset (Tunisia) Sonia Daggou (Russia) Diana Isaeva (Italy) Agnese Zucchini
November 28	2011 Vitality Trophy; Vendryně, Czech Republic; Hard $25,000; Singles – Doubles	(Switzerland) Amra Sadiković; 5–7, 6–1, 7–6^{(7–5)}	(Czech Republic) Karolína Plíšková	(Ukraine) Yulia Beygelzimer (Czech Republic) Jesika Malečková	(Bulgaria) Elitsa Kostova (Czech Republic) Kristýna Plíšková (Italy) Nastassya Burnett (Slovakia) Michaela Hončová
November 28	2011 Vitality Trophy; Vendryně, Czech Republic; Hard $25,000; Singles – Doubles	(Slovakia) Michaela Hončová (Slovakia) Zuzana Luknárová; 7–5, 6–4	(Czech Republic) Iveta Gerlová (Czech Republic) Lucie Kriegsmannová	(Ukraine) Yulia Beygelzimer (Czech Republic) Jesika Malečková	(Bulgaria) Elitsa Kostova (Czech Republic) Kristýna Plíšková (Italy) Nastassya Burnett (Slovakia) Michaela Hončová
November 28	Antalya, Turkey; Clay $10,000; Singles draw – Doubles draw	(Belarus) Ilona Kremen; 7–6^{(8–6)}, 6–7^{(4–7)}, 6–1	(Belarus) Ksenia Milevskaya	(Ukraine) Viktoriya Kutuzova (Italy) Anastasia Grymalska	(Netherlands) Nicolette van Uitert (Romania) Diana Enache (Serbia) Marina Kachar (Ukraine) Nadya Kolb
November 28	Antalya, Turkey; Clay $10,000; Singles draw – Doubles draw	(Romania) Diana Enache (Netherlands) Daniëlle Harmsen; 7–5, 6–2	(Romania) Elena-Teodora Cadar (Romania) Ioana Loredana Roșca	(Ukraine) Viktoriya Kutuzova (Italy) Anastasia Grymalska	(Netherlands) Nicolette van Uitert (Romania) Diana Enache (Serbia) Marina Kachar (Ukraine) Nadya Kolb
November 28	2011 Al Habtoor Tennis Challenge; Dubai, United Arab Emirates; Hard $75,000; Singles – Doubles	(Thailand) Noppawan Lertcheewakarn; 7–5, 6–4	(France) Kristina Mladenovic	(Romania) Simona Halep (Netherlands) Arantxa Rus	(Belarus) Olga Govortsova (Russia) Regina Kulikova (Poland) Urszula Radwańska (Uzbekistan) Akgul Amanmuradova
November 28	2011 Al Habtoor Tennis Challenge; Dubai, United Arab Emirates; Hard $75,000; Singles – Doubles	(Russia) Nina Bratchikova (Croatia) Darija Jurak; 6–4, 3–6, [10–6]	(Uzbekistan) Akgul Amanmuradova (Romania) Alexandra Dulgheru	(Romania) Simona Halep (Netherlands) Arantxa Rus	(Belarus) Olga Govortsova (Russia) Regina Kulikova (Poland) Urszula Radwańska (Uzbekistan) Akgul Amanmuradova
November 28	2011 AAT Women's Circuit Rosario; Rosario, Santa Fe, Argentina; Clay $25,000; Singles – Doubles	(South Africa) Chanel Simmonds; 6–3, 6–4	(United States) Julia Cohen	(Spain) Inés Ferrer Suárez (Argentina) Florencia Molinero	(Norway) Ulrikke Eikeri (Paraguay) Verónica Cepede Royg (Argentina) María Irigoyen (Peru) Bianca Botto
November 28	2011 AAT Women's Circuit Rosario; Rosario, Santa Fe, Argentina; Clay $25,000; Singles – Doubles	(Argentina) Mailen Auroux (Argentina) María Irigoyen; 4–6, 6–1, [10–7]	(Spain) Inés Ferrer Suárez (Netherlands) Richèl Hogenkamp	(Spain) Inés Ferrer Suárez (Argentina) Florencia Molinero	(Norway) Ulrikke Eikeri (Paraguay) Verónica Cepede Royg (Argentina) María Irigoyen (Peru) Bianca Botto

== December ==
Week of	Tournament	Winner	Runners-up	Semifinalists	Quarterfinalists
December 5	Antalya, Turkey; Clay $10,000; Singles draw – Doubles draw	(Ukraine) Viktoriya Kutuzova; 3–6, 6–1, 6–1	(Romania) Patricia Maria Țig	(Ukraine) Anastasiya Vasylyeva (Italy) Gioia Barbieri	(Bosnia and Herzegovina) Jasmina Tinjić (Belarus) Ilona Kremen (Romania) Laura-Ioana Andrei (Georgia (country)) Ekaterine Gorgodze
December 5	Antalya, Turkey; Clay $10,000; Singles draw – Doubles draw	(Turkey) Hülya Esen (Turkey) Lütifiye Esen; 6–0, 1–6, [10–7]	(Romania) Laura-Ioana Andrei (Romania) Raluca Elena Platon	(Ukraine) Anastasiya Vasylyeva (Italy) Gioia Barbieri	(Bosnia and Herzegovina) Jasmina Tinjić (Belarus) Ilona Kremen (Romania) Laura-Ioana Andrei (Georgia (country)) Ekaterine Gorgodze
December 5	Solapur, India; Hard $10,000; Singles draw – Doubles draw	(Ukraine) Anna Shkudun; 6–3, 4–6, 6–0	(Israel) Deniz Khazaniuk	(Turkey) Melis Sezer (Serbia) Tamara Čurović	(India) Isha Lakhani (China) Lu Jiajing (Chinese Taipei) Lee Pei-chi (India) Kyra Shroff
December 5	Solapur, India; Hard $10,000; Singles draw – Doubles draw	(China) Lu Jia Xiang (China) Lu Jiajing; 6–0, 7–5	(India) Isha Lakhani (India) Sri Peddi Reddy	(Turkey) Melis Sezer (Serbia) Tamara Čurović	(India) Isha Lakhani (China) Lu Jiajing (Chinese Taipei) Lee Pei-chi (India) Kyra Shroff
December 5	2011 AAT Women's Circuit Buenos Aires (2); Buenos Aires, Argentina; Clay $25,000; Singles – Doubles	(United States) Julia Cohen; 7–5, 6–3	(Slovakia) Romana Tabak	(Croatia) Tereza Mrdeža (Norway) Ulrikke Eikeri	(Spain) Inés Ferrer Suárez (Brazil) Roxane Vaisemberg (Brazil) Teliana Pereira (Argentina) Mailen Auroux
December 5	2011 AAT Women's Circuit Buenos Aires (2); Buenos Aires, Argentina; Clay $25,000; Singles – Doubles	(Argentina) Mailen Auroux (Argentina) María Irigoyen; 6–1, 6–3	(Brazil) Teliana Pereira (Brazil) Vivian Segnini	(Croatia) Tereza Mrdeža (Norway) Ulrikke Eikeri	(Spain) Inés Ferrer Suárez (Brazil) Roxane Vaisemberg (Brazil) Teliana Pereira (Argentina) Mailen Auroux
December 5	Quito, Ecuador; Clay $10,000; Singles draw – Doubles draw	(Slovakia) Zuzana Zlochová; 6–1, 6–7^{(4–7)}, 6–2	(United States) Elizabeth Ferris	(Brazil) Carla Forte (Slovakia) Lenka Broošová	(Peru) Ingrid Várgas Calvo (Hungary) Naomi Totka (Ecuador) Doménica González (Peru) Patricia Kú Flores
December 5	Quito, Ecuador; Clay $10,000; Singles draw – Doubles draw	(United States) Veronica Corning (United States) Nicole Robinson; 6–3, 6–4	(Mexico) Nadia Abdala (Brazil) Marina Danzini	(Brazil) Carla Forte (Slovakia) Lenka Broošová	(Peru) Ingrid Várgas Calvo (Hungary) Naomi Totka (Ecuador) Doménica González (Peru) Patricia Kú Flores
December 12	Antalya, Turkey; Clay $10,000; Singles draw – Doubles draw	(Russia) Daria Salnikova; 6–3, 6–1	(Bosnia and Herzegovina) Jasmina Kajtazovič	(Belarus) Ilona Kremen (Ukraine) Viktoriya Kutuzova	(Russia) Olga Doroshina (Romania) Laura-Ioana Andrei (Ukraine) Anastasiya Vasylyeva (Italy) Gioia Barbieri
December 12	Antalya, Turkey; Clay $10,000; Singles draw – Doubles draw	(Italy) Gioia Barbieri (Italy) Giulia Pasini; 7–6^{(8–6)}, 4–6, [10–5]	(Turkey) Başak Eraydın (Belarus) Ilona Kremen	(Belarus) Ilona Kremen (Ukraine) Viktoriya Kutuzova	(Russia) Olga Doroshina (Romania) Laura-Ioana Andrei (Ukraine) Anastasiya Vasylyeva (Italy) Gioia Barbieri
December 12	Pune, India; Hard $10,000; Singles draw – Doubles draw	(China) Lu Jiajing; 6–3, 6–2	(Thailand) Nicha Lertpitaksinchai	(Serbia) Tamara Čurović (Thailand) Peangtarn Plipuech	(Japan) Sachie Ishizu (India) Rishika Sunkara (Russia) Ksenia Kirillova (Slovenia) Anja Prislan
December 12	Pune, India; Hard $10,000; Singles draw – Doubles draw	(China) Lu Jia Xiang (China) Lu Jiajing; 6–7^{(6–8)}, 6–1, [10–5]	(Serbia) Tamara Čurović (Ukraine) Anna Shkudun	(Serbia) Tamara Čurović (Thailand) Peangtarn Plipuech	(Japan) Sachie Ishizu (India) Rishika Sunkara (Russia) Ksenia Kirillova (Slovenia) Anja Prislan
December 12	Djibouti, Djibouti; Hard $10,000; Singles draw – Doubles draw	(India) Shivika Burman; 7–5, 0–6, 6–3	(Russia) Margarita Lazareva	(Russia) Alexandra Romanova (India) Poojashree Venkatesha	(Italy) Francesca Sella (India) Nidhi Chilumula (Russia) Yana Sizikova (India) Gopika Kapoor
December 12	Djibouti, Djibouti; Hard $10,000; Singles draw – Doubles draw	(Russia) Alexandra Romanova (India) Poojashree Venkatesha; 6–1, 6–0	(Russia) Diana Isaeva (Russia) Anna Morgina	(Russia) Alexandra Romanova (India) Poojashree Venkatesha	(Italy) Francesca Sella (India) Nidhi Chilumula (Russia) Yana Sizikova (India) Gopika Kapoor
December 12	2011 Copa Providencia BCI; Santiago, Chile; Clay $25,000; Singles – Doubles	(Paraguay) Verónica Cepede Royg; 6–0, 1–6, 6–3	(Argentina) Mailen Auroux	(Brazil) Paula Cristina Gonçalves (Slovakia) Romana Tabak	(Peru) Bianca Botto (Spain) Inés Ferrer Suárez (Netherlands) Richèl Hogenkamp (Argentina) María Irigoyen
December 12	2011 Copa Providencia BCI; Santiago, Chile; Clay $25,000; Singles – Doubles	(Spain) Inés Ferrer Suárez (Netherlands) Richèl Hogenkamp; 6–4, 3–6, [10–5]	(Argentina) Mailen Auroux (Argentina) María Irigoyen	(Brazil) Paula Cristina Gonçalves (Slovakia) Romana Tabak	(Peru) Bianca Botto (Spain) Inés Ferrer Suárez (Netherlands) Richèl Hogenkamp (Argentina) María Irigoyen
December 19	2011 Ankara Cup; Ankara, Turkey; Hard $50,000; Singles – Doubles	(France) Kristina Mladenovic; 7–5, 5–7, 6–1	(Russia) Valeria Savinykh	(Ukraine) Elina Svitolina (Netherlands) Kiki Bertens	(Switzerland) Amra Sadiković (Luxembourg) Anne Kremer (Romania) Mihaela Buzărnescu (France) Caroline Garcia
December 19	2011 Ankara Cup; Ankara, Turkey; Hard $50,000; Singles – Doubles	(Russia) Nina Bratchikova (Croatia) Darija Jurak; 6–4, 6–2	(Slovakia) Janette Husárová (Hungary) Katalin Marosi	(Ukraine) Elina Svitolina (Netherlands) Kiki Bertens	(Switzerland) Amra Sadiković (Luxembourg) Anne Kremer (Romania) Mihaela Buzărnescu (France) Caroline Garcia
December 19	2011 NECC ITF International Women's Tournament; Pune, India; Hard $25,000; Singles – Doubles	(France) Céline Cattaneo; 2–6, 7–5, 6–3	(Ukraine) Anna Shkudun	(Thailand) Varatchaya Wongteanchai (Turkey) Melis Sezer	(India) Rutuja Bhosale (Thailand) Nicha Lertpitaksinchai (Slovenia) Tadeja Majerič (Chinese Taipei) Juan Ting-fei
December 19	2011 NECC ITF International Women's Tournament; Pune, India; Hard $25,000; Singles – Doubles	(China) Lu Jia Xiang (China) Lu Jiajing; 6–1, 6–3	(Thailand) Varatchaya Wongteanchai (Thailand) Varunya Wongteanchai	(Thailand) Varatchaya Wongteanchai (Turkey) Melis Sezer	(India) Rutuja Bhosale (Thailand) Nicha Lertpitaksinchai (Slovenia) Tadeja Majerič (Chinese Taipei) Juan Ting-fei
December 19	Djibouti, Djibouti; Hard $10,000; Singles draw – Doubles draw	(Russia) Alexandra Romanova; 6–3, 6–4	(Russia) Anna Morgina	(Russia) Yana Sizikova (Russia) Margarita Lazareva	(Croatia) Mariana Dražić (India) Shivika Burman (India) Poojashree Venkatesha (Russia) Diana Isaeva
December 19	Djibouti, Djibouti; Hard $10,000; Singles draw – Doubles draw	(Russia) Alexandra Romanova (India) Poojashree Venkatesha; 7–5, 7–6^{(10–8)}	(Russia) Diana Isaeva (Russia) Margarita Lazareva	(Russia) Yana Sizikova (Russia) Margarita Lazareva	(Croatia) Mariana Dražić (India) Shivika Burman (India) Poojashree Venkatesha (Russia) Diana Isaeva
December 26	2011 Siberia Cup; Tyumen, Russia; Hard $50,000; Singles – Doubles	(Russia) Yulia Putintseva; 6–2, 6–4	(Ukraine) Elina Svitolina	(Ukraine) Olga Savchuk (Belarus) Polina Pekhova	(Russia) Daria Gavrilova (Ukraine) Veronika Kapshay (Ukraine) Lyudmyla Kichenok (Ukraine) Irina Buryachok
December 26	2011 Siberia Cup; Tyumen, Russia; Hard $50,000; Singles – Doubles	(Belarus) Darya Kustova (Ukraine) Olga Savchuk; 6–0, 6–2	(Russia) Natela Dzalamidze (Russia) Margarita Gasparyan	(Ukraine) Olga Savchuk (Belarus) Polina Pekhova	(Russia) Daria Gavrilova (Ukraine) Veronika Kapshay (Ukraine) Lyudmyla Kichenok (Ukraine) Irina Buryachok

== See also ==
- 2011 ITF Women's Circuit
- 2011 ITF Women's Circuit (January–March)
- 2011 ITF Women's Circuit (April–June)
- 2011 ITF Women's Circuit (July–September)
- 2011 WTA Tour
