= 2011 Q Hotel & Spa Women's Pro Tennis Classic =

Professional tennis tournament

- Date: 3–9 October
- Edition: 3rd
- Location: Kansas City, Missouri, United States

Champions

Singles
- (United States) Varvara Lepchenko

Doubles
- (Croatia) Maria Abramović / (Czech Republic) Eva Hrdinová
← 2010 ·	Q Hotel & Spa Women's Pro Tennis Classic	· 2012 →

The 2011 Q Hotel & Spa Women's Pro Tennis Classic was a professional tennis tournament played on hard courts. It was the third edition of the tournament which is part of the 2011 ITF Women's Circuit. It took place in Kansas City, Missouri, between 3 and 9 October 2011.

== WTA entrants ==
=== Seeds ===
Country	Player	Rank^{1}	Seed
USA	Varvara Lepchenko	109	1
ITA	Romina Oprandi	114	2
USA	Jamie Hampton	135	3
~~RUS~~	~~Regina Kulikova~~	~~143~~	~~4~~
CAN	Sharon Fichman	162	5
CRO	Ajla Tomljanović	165	6
USA	Alexa Glatch	167	7
USA	Chichi Scholl	171	8

- ^{1} Rankings are as of September 26, 2011.

=== Other entrants ===
The following players received wildcards into the singles main draw:

- (United States) ~~Lauren Davis~~ (withdrew)
- (United States) Maria Sanchez
- (United States) Yasmin Schnack
- (United States) Olivia Sneed

The following players received entry from the qualifying draw:

- (Canada) Eugenie Bouchard
- (United States) Alexandra Mueller
- (United States) ~~Asia Muhammad~~ (withdrew)
- (Canada) Marie-Ève Pelletier

The following players received entry by a lucky loser spot:

- (United States) Brianna Morgan
- (Finland) Piia Suomalainen
- (Indonesia) Romana Tedjakusuma

== Champions ==
=== Singles ===
(United States) Varvara Lepchenko def. (Italy) Romina Oprandi, 6–4, 6–1

=== Doubles ===
(Croatia) Maria Abramović / (Czech Republic) Eva Hrdinová def. (United States) Jamie Hampton / (Croatia) Ajla Tomljanović, 2–6, 6–2, [10–4]
