= Q Hotel & Spa Women's Pro Tennis Classic =

Women's tennis tournament

Q Hotel & Spa Tennis Classic

ITF Women's Tour
- Event name: Q Hotel & Spa Tennis Classic
- Location: Kansas City, Missouri, United States
- Venue: Plaza Tennis Center
- Category: ITF Women's Circuit
- Surface: Hard
- Draw: 32S/32Q/16D
- Prize money: $50,000
- Website: plazatenniscenter.com

The Q Hotel & Spa Women's Pro Tennis Classic was a tournament for professional female tennis players played on outdoor clay courts. The event was classified as a $50,000 ITF Women's Circuit tournament. It was held annually in Kansas City, Missouri, United States from 2009 to 2011.

== Past finals ==
=== Singles ===
Year	Champion	Runner-up	Score
2011	(United States) Varvara Lepchenko	(Italy) Romina Oprandi	6–4, 6–1
2010	(Canada) Rebecca Marino	(Romania) Edina Gallovits	6–7^{(4–7)}, 6–0, 6–2
2009	(Russia) Regina Kulikova	(Canada) Valérie Tétreault	6–4, 6–1

=== Doubles ===
Year	Champions	Runners-up	Score
2011	(Croatia) Maria Abramović (Czech Republic) Eva Hrdinová	(United States) Jamie Hampton (Croatia) Ajla Tomljanović	2–6, 6–2, [10–4]
2010	(United States) Julie Ditty (United States) Abigail Spears	(United States) Lauren Albanese (United States) Irina Falconi	6–2, 4–6, [10–3]
2009	(United States) Lilia Osterloh (Georgia (country)) Anna Tatishvili	(United States) Julia Boserup (United States) Laura Granville	6–0, 6–3
