= 2011 Challenger Banque Nationale de Saguenay – Doubles =

Doubles
- 2011 Challenger Banque Nationale de Saguenay

Final
- Champions: (Hungary) Tímea Babos (United States) Jessica Pegula
- Runners-up: (Canada) Gabriela Dabrowski (Canada) Marie-Ève Pelletier
- Score: 6–4, 6–3

Events
Singles	Doubles
← 2010 ·	Challenger de Saguenay	· 2012 →

Jorgelina Cravero and Stéphanie Foretz Gacon were the defending champions, but both players chose not to participate.

Tímea Babos and Jessica Pegula won the title defeating Gabriela Dabrowski and Marie-Ève Pelletier in the final 6–4, 6–3.

== Seeds ==
1. (Canada) Sharon Fichman / (China) Sun Shengnan (semifinals)
2. (Croatia) Maria Abramović / (Latvia) Līga Dekmeijere (quarterfinals)
3. (Hungary) Tímea Babos / (United States) Jessica Pegula (champions)
4. (Canada) Gabriela Dabrowski / (Canada) Marie-Ève Pelletier (final)

== Draw ==
=== Key ===
- Q = Qualifier
- WC = Wild card
- LL = Lucky loser
- Alt = Alternate
- SE = Special exempt
- PR = Protected ranking
- ITF = ITF entry
- JE = Junior exempt
- w/o = Walkover
- r = Retired
- d = Defaulted
- SR = Special ranking

=== Draw ===
First round
1	(Canada) S Fichman (China) S Sun	6	4	[10]
(Austria) N Rottmann (Germany) S Werner	4	6	[8]
(United States) C-y Hsu (United States) E Peters	6	5	[6]
(Brazil) MF Alves (United States) J Boserup	3	7	[10]
3	(Hungary) T Babos (United States) J Pegula	4	6	[10]
WC	(Canada) E Abanda (Canada) K-A Surin	6	1	[4]
(Belarus) V Kisialeva (Brazil) N Rossi	1	4
WC	(Canada) E Routliffe (Canada) C Zhao	6	6
(United Kingdom) J Allan (Russia) N Kukharchok	2	2
(Ukraine) I Buryachok (Switzerland) A Sadiković	6	6
(United States) J Elie (United States) W Jones	0	5
4	(Canada) G Dabrowski (Canada) M-È Pelletier	6	7
(Canada) E Bouchard (United States) A Fink	6	6
(France) C Cattaneo (France) A Lim	3	1
WC	(Canada) A Muamba (Canada) C Petrick	2	0
2	(Croatia) M Abramović (Latvia) L Dekmeijere	6	6

Quarterfinals
1	(Canada) S Fichman (China) S Sun	7^{7}	6
(Brazil) MF Alves (United States) J Boserup	6^{5}	3
3	(Hungary) T Babos (United States) J Pegula	3	6	[10]
(Canada) E Routliffe (Canada) C Zhao	6	3	[7]
(Ukraine) I Buryachok (Switzerland) A Sadiković	5	2
4	(Canada) G Dabrowski (Canada) M-È Pelletier	7	6
(Canada) E Bouchard (United States) A Fink	6	3	[10]
2	(Croatia) M Abramović (Latvia) L Dekmeijere	4	6	[8]

Semifinals
1	(Canada) S Fichman (China) S Sun	4	6	[10]
3	(Hungary) T Babos (United States) J Pegula	6	3	[12]
4	(Canada) G Dabrowski (Canada) M-È Pelletier	6	6
(Canada) E Bouchard (United States) A Fink	3	2

Finals
3	(Hungary) T Babos (United States) J Pegula	6	6
4	(Canada) G Dabrowski (Canada) M-È Pelletier	4	3
