= 2011 Challenger Banque Nationale de Saguenay – Singles =

Singles
- 2011 Challenger Banque Nationale de Saguenay

Final
- Champion: (Hungary) Tímea Babos
- Runner-up: (United States) Julia Boserup
- Score: 7–6^{(9–7)}, 6–3

Events
Singles	Doubles
← 2010 ·	Challenger de Saguenay	· 2012 →

Rebecca Marino was the defending champion, but chose not to participate.

Tímea Babos won the title defeating Julia Boserup in the final 7–6^{(9–7)}, 6–3.

== Seeds ==
1. (Croatia) Mirjana Lučić (semifinals)
2. (Canada) Sharon Fichman (quarterfinals)
3. (Hungary) Tímea Babos (champion)
4. (France) Alizé Lim (second round)
5. (United States) Julia Boserup (final)
6. (United States) Alexandra Stevenson (semifinals)
7. (Ukraine) Irina Buryachok (quarterfinals)
8. (United States) Amanda Fink (second round)

== Main draw ==
=== Key ===
- Q = Qualifier
- WC = Wild card
- LL = Lucky loser
- Alt = Alternate
- SE = Special exempt
- PR = Protected ranking
- ITF = ITF entry
- JE = Junior exempt
- w/o = Walkover
- r = Retired
- d = Defaulted
- SR = Special ranking

=== Finals ===
Semifinals
1	(Croatia) Mirjana Lučić	6	3	6^{4}
3	(Hungary) Tímea Babos	1	6	7^{7}
5	(United States) Julia Boserup	7^{7}	6
6	(United States) Alexandra Stevenson	6^{5}	1

Final
3	(Hungary) Tímea Babos	7^{9}	6
5	(United States) Julia Boserup	6^{7}	3

=== Top half ===
First round
1	(Croatia) M Lučić	7	6
(Croatia) M Abramović	5	0
(Austria) N Rottmann	6	4	6
WC	(Canada) K-A Surin	4	6	3
(Brazil) MF Alves	5	3
(Switzerland) A Sadiković	7	6
(France) C Cattaneo	6	6^{5}	2
8	(United States) A Fink	4	7^{7}	6
3	(Hungary) T Babos	6	6
(Canada) G Dabrowski	3	1
(Canada) E Bouchard	7^{7}	4	6
Q	(China) S Sun	6^{2}	6	3
(United States) J Pegula	7^{7}	7
(United States) C-y Hsu	6^{3}	5
Q	(Belarus) V Kisialeva	2	4
7	(Ukraine) I Buryachok	6	6

Second round
1	(Croatia) M Lučić	6	6
(Austria) N Rottmann	4	3
(Switzerland) A Sadiković	6	6
8	(United States) A Fink	4	1
3	(Hungary) T Babos	6	6
(Canada) E Bouchard	2	4
(United States) J Pegula	6^{5}	3
7	(Ukraine) I Buryachok	7^{7}	6

Quarterfinals
1	(Croatia) M Lučić	6	6
(Switzerland) A Sadiković	3	2
3	(Hungary) T Babos	6	6
7	(Ukraine) I Buryachok	3	3

Semifinals
1	(Croatia) M Lučić	6	3	6^{4}
3	(Hungary) T Babos	1	6	7^{7}

=== Bottom half ===
First round
5	(United States) J Boserup	6	6
(United States) W Jones	2	2
WC	(Canada) E Abanda	6	3	6
WC	(Canada) C Petrick	1	6	1
(Brazil) N Rossi	3	0
WC	(Canada) E Routliffe	6	6
(United States) J Elie	7^{7}	0	2
4	(France) A Lim	6^{4}	6	6
6	(United States) A Stevenson	6	6
Q	(United States) EJ Harman	1	4
Q	(United States) D Ospina	6	6
(Canada) C Zhao	1	2
(Germany) S Werner	6	6
LL	(Latvia) L Dekmeijere	2	2
(Canada) M-È Pelletier	6	6^{3}	4
2	(Canada) S Fichman	2	7^{7}	6

Second round
5	(United States) J Boserup	6	6
WC	(Canada) E Abanda	0	1
WC	(Canada) E Routliffe	3	6	7^{7}
4	(France) A Lim	6	2	6^{3}
6	(United States) A Stevenson	6	6
Q	(United States) D Ospina	2	3
(Germany) S Werner	7^{7}	3	1
2	(Canada) S Fichman	6^{5}	6	6

Quarterfinals
5	(United States) J Boserup	6	6
WC	(Canada) E Routliffe	2	2
6	(United States) A Stevenson	6	4	7
2	(Canada) S Fichman	2	6	5

Semifinals
5	(United States) J Boserup	7^{7}	6
6	(United States) A Stevenson	6^{5}	1
