= 2011 Q Hotel & Spa Women's Pro Tennis Classic – Doubles =

Doubles
- 2011 Q Hotel & Spa Women's Pro Tennis Classic

Final
- Champions: (Croatia) Maria Abramović (Czech Republic) Eva Hrdinová
- Runners-up: (United States) Jamie Hampton (Croatia) Ajla Tomljanović
- Score: 2–6, 6–2, [10–4]

Events
Singles	Doubles
← 2010 ·	Q Hotel & Spa Women's Pro Tennis Classic	· 2012 →

Julie Ditty and Abigail Spears were the defending champions, but both players chose not to participate.
Maria Abramović and Eva Hrdinová won the title by defeating Jamie Hampton and Ajla Tomljanović in the final 2–6, 6–2, [10–4].

== Seeds ==
1. (Canada) Sharon Fichman / (Canada) Marie-Ève Pelletier (first round)
2. (United States) Alexa Glatch / (United States) Ahsha Rolle (quarterfinals)
3. (Hungary) Tímea Babos / (Russia) Valeria Savinykh (quarterfinals)
4. (United States) Alexandra Mueller / (United States) Asia Muhammed (quarterfinals, withdrew)

== Draw ==
=== Key ===
- Q = Qualifier
- WC = Wild card
- LL = Lucky loser
- Alt = Alternate
- SE = Special exempt
- PR = Protected ranking
- ITF = ITF entry
- JE = Junior exempt
- w/o = Walkover
- r = Retired
- d = Defaulted
- SR = Special ranking

=== Draw ===
First round
1	(Canada) S Fichman (Canada) M-È Pelletier	4	6	[6]
(Kazakhstan) S Karatantcheva (Italy) R Oprandi	6	3	[10]
(Colombia) Y Lizarazo (Brazil) R Vaisemberg	6	4	[4]
(United States) C Scholl (Ukraine) A Sotnikova	4	6	[10]
3	(Hungary) T Babos (Russia) V Savinykh	6	6
(United States) J Boserup (Denmark) M Ejdesgaard	3	4
WC	(United States) M Rose (United States) O Sneed	2	5
(Croatia) M Abramović (Czech Republic) E Hrdinová	6	7
(United States) A Fink (United States) Y Schnack	6	6
(United States) M Brengle (United States) G Brodsky	2	3
(United States) W Jones (United States) M Sanchez	2	2
4	(United States) A Mueller (United States) A Muhammed	6	6
(United States) J Hampton (Croatia) A Tomljanović	4	6	[10]
WC	(United States) L Davis (United States) V Lepchenko	6	4	[8]
(Canada) G Dabrowski (Germany) L Siegemund	2	4
2	(United States) A Glatch (United States) A Rolle	6	6

Quarterfinals
(Kazakhstan) S Karatantcheva (Italy) R Oprandi	5	4
(United States) C Scholl (Ukraine) A Sotnikova	7	6
3	(Hungary) T Babos (Russia) V Savinykh	2	6^{7}
(Croatia) M Abramović (Czech Republic) E Hrdinová	6	7^{9}
(United States) A Fink (United States) Y Schnack	w/o
4	(United States) A Mueller (United States) A Muhammed
(United States) J Hampton (Croatia) A Tomljanović	7^{7}	7^{7}
2	(United States) A Glatch (United States) A Rolle	6^{5}	6^{4}

Semifinals
(United States) C Scholl (Ukraine) A Sotnikova	0	6^{5}
(Croatia) M Abramović (Czech Republic) E Hrdinová	6	7^{7}
(United States) A Fink (United States) Y Schnack	5	6	[8]
(United States) J Hampton (Croatia) A Tomljanović	7	2	[11]

Finals
(Croatia) M Abramović (Czech Republic) E Hrdinová	2	6	[10]
(United States) J Hampton (Croatia) A Tomljanović	6	2	[4]
