= 2011 Challenger Banque Nationale de Saguenay =

- Date: October 24–30
- Edition: 6th
- Category: ITF Women's Circuit
- Prize money: US$50,000
- Surface: Hard – indoors
- Location: Saguenay, Quebec, Canada
- Venue: Club de tennis intérieur Saguenay

Champions

Singles
- (Hungary) Tímea Babos

Doubles
- (Hungary) Tímea Babos / (United States) Jessica Pegula
← 2010 ·	Challenger de Saguenay	· 2012 →

The 2011 Challenger Banque Nationale de Saguenay was a professional tennis tournament played on indoor hard courts. It was the 6th edition of the tournament and part of the 2011 ITF Women's Circuit, offering a total of $50,000 in prize money. It took place in Saguenay, Quebec, Canada between October 24 and October 30, 2011.

== Singles main-draw entrants ==
=== Seeds ===
Country	Player	Rank^{1}	Seed
CRO	Mirjana Lučić	120	1
CAN	Sharon Fichman	160	2
HUN	Tímea Babos	182	3
FRA	Alizé Lim	223	4
USA	Julia Boserup	246	5
USA	Alexandra Stevenson	258	6
UKR	Irina Buryachok	271	7
USA	Amanda Fink	289	8

- ^{1} Rankings are as of October 17, 2011

=== Other entrants ===
The following players received wildcards into the singles main draw:

- (Canada) Elisabeth Abanda
- (Canada) Charlotte Petrick
- (Canada) Erin Routliffe
- (Canada) Kimberley-Ann Surin

The following players received entry from the qualifying draw:

- (United States) Emily J. Harman
- (Belarus) Viktoryia Kisialeva
- (United States) Diana Ospina
- (China) Sun Shengnan

The following player received entry as a lucky loser:

- (Latvia) Līga Dekmeijere

== Champions ==
=== Singles ===
(Hungary) Tímea Babos def. (United States) Julia Boserup, 7–6^{(9–7)}, 6–3

=== Doubles ===
(Hungary) Tímea Babos / (United States) Jessica Pegula def. (Canada) Gabriela Dabrowski / (Canada) Marie-Ève Pelletier, 6–4, 6–3
