= 2011 Open GDF Suez Nantes Atlantique – Singles =

Singles
- 2011 Open GDF Suez Nantes Atlantique

Final
- Champion: (United States) Alison Riske
- Runner-up: (France) Iryna Brémond
- Score: 6–1, 6–4

Events
Singles	Doubles
← 2010 ·	Open GDF Suez Nantes Atlantique	· 2012 →

Lucie Hradecká was the defending champion, but chose not to participate.

Alison Riske won the title, defeating Iryna Brémond in the final, 6–1, 6–4.

== Seeds ==
1. (France) Pauline Parmentier (second round)
2. (United Kingdom) Heather Watson (quarterfinals)
3. (France) Alizé Cornet (semifinals)
4. (France) Stéphanie Foretz Gacon (quarterfinals)
5. (France) Iryna Brémond (final)
6. (Russia) Valeria Savinykh (quarterfinals)
7. (Spain) Arantxa Parra Santonja (quarterfinals)
8. (Russia) Alexandra Panova (first round)

== Main draw ==
=== Key ===
- Q = Qualifier
- WC = Wild card
- LL = Lucky loser
- Alt = Alternate
- SE = Special exempt
- PR = Protected ranking
- ITF = ITF entry
- JE = Junior exempt
- w/o = Walkover
- r = Retired
- d = Defaulted
- SR = Special ranking

=== Finals ===
Semifinals
(United States) Alison Riske	6	6
3	(France) Alizé Cornet	1	3
(France) Claire Feuerstein	0	6	2
5	(France) Iryna Brémond	6	3	6

Final
(United States) Alison Riske	6	6
5	(France) Iryna Brémond	1	4

=== Top half ===
First round
1	(France) P Parmentier	6	6
(Russia) E Ivanova	3	1
(United States) A Riske	6	6
(Russia) N Bratchikova	2	3
(Italy) A Remondina	2	6^{5}
Q	(France) S Beltrame	6	7^{7}
(Russia) Y Putintseva	6^{7}	4
7	(Spain) A Parra Santonja	7^{9}	6
3	(France) A Cornet	6	7^{7}
(Ukraine) O Savchuk	0	6^{3}
(Russia) R Kulikova	6	6
Q	(Croatia) D Jurak	1	1
WC	(France) C Paquet	2	1
(France) C Garcia	6	6
(Luxembourg) A Kremer	4	1
6	(Russia) V Savinykh	6	6

Second round
1	(France) P Parmentier	7^{7}	6^{4}	3
(United States) A Riske	6^{4}	7^{7}	6
Q	(France) S Beltrame	6	3	3
7	(Spain) A Parra Santonja	4	6	6
3	(France) A Cornet	6	6
(Russia) R Kulikova	4	3
(France) C Garcia	3	6^{6}
6	(Russia) V Savinykh	6	7^{8}

Quarterfinals
(United States) A Riske	6	6
7	(Spain) A Parra Santonja	2	4
3	(France) A Cornet	2	6	6
6	(Russia) V Savinykh	6	2	4

Semifinals
(United States) A Riske	6	6
3	(France) A Cornet	1	3

=== Bottom half ===
First round
8	(Russia) A Panova	4	6	6^{4}
WC	(France) J Coin	6	3	7^{7}
(France) C Feuerstein	6	2	6
(Bulgaria) E Kostova	3	6	3
Q	(Poland) M Linette	1	6	4
(Italy) ME Camerin	6	3	6
(Switzerland) S Vögele	3	4
4	(France) S Foretz Gacon	6	6
5	(France) I Brémond	6	6
WC	(France) A Laurendon	2	3
(France) V Larrière	6	2
Q	(Slovakia) M Hončová	4	1^{r}
(Spain) L Costas	6	6
WC	(France) A Tisset	1	1
(France) K Mladenovic	6^{3}	2
2	(United Kingdom) H Watson	7^{7}	6

Second round
WC	(France) J Coin	6^{3}	7^{7}	6^{2}
(France) C Feuerstein	7^{7}	6^{5}	7^{7}
(Italy) ME Camerin	6	3	4
4	(France) S Foretz Gacon	3	6	6
5	(France) I Brémond	6	7
(France) V Larrière	3	5
(Spain) L Costas	0	1
2	(United Kingdom) H Watson	6	6

Quarterfinals
(France) C Feuerstein	6	6
4	(France) S Foretz Gacon	3	2
5	(France) I Brémond	6	6
2	(United Kingdom) H Watson	2	4

Semifinals
(France) C Feuerstein	0	6	2
5	(France) I Brémond	6	3	6
