= 2011 Open GDF Suez Nantes Atlantique – Doubles =

Doubles
- 2011 Open GDF Suez Nantes Atlantique

Final
- Champions: (France) Stéphanie Foretz Gacon (France) Kristina Mladenovic
- Runners-up: (France) Julie Coin (Czech Republic) Eva Hrdinová
- Score: 6–0, 6–4

Events
Singles	Doubles
← 2010 ·	Open GDF Suez Nantes Atlantique	· 2012 →

Anne Keothavong and Anna Smith were the defending champions, but both players chose not to participate.

Stéphanie Foretz Gacon and Kristina Mladenovic won the title, defeating Julie Coin and Eva Hrdinová in the final, 6–0, 6–4.

== Seeds ==
1. (Russia) Nina Bratchikova / (Croatia) Darija Jurak (semifinals)
2. (Russia) Maria Kondratieva / (France) Sophie Lefèvre (first round)
3. (Russia) Ekaterina Ivanova / (Ukraine) Olga Savchuk (first round)
4. (Italy) Maria Elena Camerin / (Slovakia) Janette Husárová (quarterfinals)

== Draw ==
=== Key ===
- Q = Qualifier
- WC = Wild card
- LL = Lucky loser
- Alt = Alternate
- SE = Special exempt
- PR = Protected ranking
- ITF = ITF entry
- JE = Junior exempt
- w/o = Walkover
- r = Retired
- d = Defaulted
- SR = Special ranking

First round
1	(Russia) N Bratchikova (Croatia) D Jurak	w/o
(Slovakia) M Hončová (Italy) A Remondina
(France) J Ginier (France) A Tisset	1	1
(United States) A Riske (Switzerland) S Vögele	6	6
4	(Italy) ME Camerin (Slovakia) J Husárová	w/o
(France) S Gauvain (France) C Roméo
(Oman) F Al-Nabhani (France) S Piquerez	0	0
(France) S Foretz Gacon (France) K Mladenovic	6	6
(France) I Ramialison (Belgium) V Verhamme	6	6
(Russia) J Kushnereva (Russia) A Treskunova	1	0
(France) J Coin (Czech Republic) E Hrdinová	6	6
3	(Russia) E Ivanova (Ukraine) O Savchuk	4	4
(Bulgaria) E Kostova (Luxembourg) A Kremer	6	6
(Venezuela) M Giral Lores (France) V Larrière	2	1
(Russia) Y Buchina (Belarus) P Pekhova	7^{7}	7
2	(Russia) M Kondratieva (France) S Lefèvre	6^{4}	5

Quarterfinals
1	(Russia) N Bratchikova (Croatia) D Jurak	6	6
(United States) A Riske (Switzerland) S Vögele	4	4
4	(Italy) ME Camerin (Slovakia) J Husárová	6^{7}	4
(France) S Foretz Gacon (France) K Mladenovic	7^{9}	6
(France) I Ramialison (Belgium) V Verhamme	2	2
(France) J Coin (Czech Republic) E Hrdinová	6	6
(Bulgaria) E Kostova (Luxembourg) A Kremer	7	2	[7]
(Russia) Y Buchina (Belarus) P Pekhova	5	6	[10]

Semifinals
1	(Russia) N Bratchikova (Croatia) D Jurak	4	1
(France) S Foretz Gacon (France) K Mladenovic	6	6
(France) J Coin (Czech Republic) E Hrdinová	6	6
(Russia) Y Buchina (Belarus) P Pekhova	4	2

Finals
(France) S Foretz Gacon (France) K Mladenovic	6	6
(France) J Coin (Czech Republic) E Hrdinová	0	4
