= 2011 Open GDF Suez de Touraine – Doubles =

Doubles
- 2011 Open GDF Suez de Touraine

Final
- Champions: (Ukraine) Lyudmyla Kichenok (Ukraine) Nadiya Kichenok
- Runners-up: (Greece) Eirini Georgatou (France) Irena Pavlovic
- Score: 6–2, 6–0

Events
Singles	Doubles
← 2010 ·	Open GDF Suez de Touraine	· 2012 →

Tatjana Malek and Irena Pavlovic were the defending champions, but Malek chose not to participate. Pavlovic competed with Eirini Georgatou, but lost in the final to Lyudmyla Kichenok and Nadiya Kichenok 6–2, 6–0.

== Seeds ==
1. (Italy) Maria Elena Camerin / (Spain) Laura Pous Tió (quarterfinals)
2. (Ukraine) Lyudmyla Kichenok / (Ukraine) Nadiya Kichenok (champions)
3. (Russia) Vesna Dolonts / (Switzerland) Stefanie Vögele (first round, retired)
4. (Ukraine) Alona Bondarenko / (Ukraine) Olga Savchuk (semifinals)

== Draw ==
=== Key ===
- Q = Qualifier
- WC = Wild card
- LL = Lucky loser
- Alt = Alternate
- SE = Special exempt
- PR = Protected ranking
- ITF = ITF entry
- JE = Junior exempt
- w/o = Walkover
- r = Retired
- d = Defaulted
- SR = Special ranking

=== Draw ===
First round
(Greece) E Georgatou (France) I Pavlovic	6	4	[10]
(Argentina) P Ormaechea (France) I Ramialison	3	6	[8]
3	(Russia) V Dolonts (Switzerland) S Vögele	4^{r}
(Australia) J Konta (United States) A Riske	2
(France) C Feuerstein (France) A Laurendon	6^{6}	3
(Poland) M Domachowska (Netherlands) M Krajicek	7^{8}	6
(Italy) N Burnett (Uzbekistan) A Khabibulina	3	7^{7}	[5]
(Slovakia) K Kučová (Czech Republic) R Voráčová	6	6^{3}	[10]
(Slovakia) M Hončová (Slovakia) L Juríková	4	1
4	(Ukraine) A Bondarenko (Ukraine) O Savchuk	6	6
(France) E Lechemia (France) C Sibille	2	6	[3]
(Czech Republic) H Birnerová (Poland) M Linette	6	4	[10]

Quarterfinals
1	(Italy) ME Camerin (Spain) L Pous Tió	3	5
(Greece) E Georgatou (France) I Pavlovic	6	7
(Australia) J Konta (United States) A Riske	7^{7}	6
(Poland) M Domachowska (Netherlands) M Krajicek	6^{5}	4
(Slovakia) K Kučová (Czech Republic) R Voráčová
4	(Ukraine) A Bondarenko (Ukraine) O Savchuk	w/o
(Czech Republic) H Birnerová (Poland) M Linette	6	6^{4}	[9]
2	(Ukraine) L Kichenok (Ukraine) N Kichenok	3	7^{7}	[11]

Semifinals
(Greece) E Georgatou (France) I Pavlovic	6	3	[10]
(Australia) J Konta (United States) A Riske	4	6	[4]
4	(Ukraine) A Bondarenko (Ukraine) O Savchuk	2	3
2	(Ukraine) L Kichenok (Ukraine) N Kichenok	6	6

Finals
(Greece) E Georgatou (France) I Pavlovic	2	0
2	(Ukraine) L Kichenok (Ukraine) N Kichenok	6	6
