= 2011 Open GDF Suez de Touraine =

- Date: 10–16 October
- Edition: 6th
- Location: Joué-lès-Tours, France

Champions

Singles
- (United States) Alison Riske

Doubles
- (Ukraine) Lyudmyla Kichenok / (Ukraine) Nadiia Kichenok
- Open GDF Suez de Touraine

The 2011 Open GDF Suez de Touraine is a women's professional tennis tournament on the 2011 ITF Women's Circuit played on hard courts. It was the sixth edition and took place in Joué-lès-Tours, France between October 10-16 in 2011.

== WTA entrants ==
=== Seeds ===
| Country | Player | Rank^{1} | Seed |
|---|---|---|---|
| ESP | Laura Pous Tió | 79 | 1 |
| CZE | Andrea Hlaváčková | 93 | 2 |
| ~~RUS~~ | ~~Vesna Dolonts~~ | ~~101~~ | ~~3~~ |
| NED | Michaëlla Krajicek | 112 | 5 |
| USA | Alison Riske | 125 | 7 |
| UZB | Akgul Amanmuradova | 127 | 6 |
| RUS | Alexandra Panova | 134 | 4 |
| SUI | Stefanie Vögele | 143 | 8 |

- ^{1} Rankings are as of October 3, 2011.

=== Other entrants ===
The following players received wildcards into the singles main draw:

- (France) Audrey Bergot
- (France) Myrtille Georges
- (France) Anaïs Laurendon
- (France) Irena Pavlovic

The following players received entry from the qualifying draw:

- (France) Lou Brouleau
- (France) Julie Coin
- (Italy) Anna Remondina
- (France) Constance Sibille

The following players received entry by a lucky loser spot:

- (Slovakia) Michaela Hončová
- (Uzbekistan) Albina Khabibulina

== Champions ==
=== Singles ===
(United States) Alison Riske def. (Uzbekistan) Akgul Amanmuradova, 2–6, 6–2, 7–5

=== Doubles ===
(Ukraine) Lyudmyla Kichenok / (Ukraine) Nadiia Kichenok def. (Greece) Eirini Georgatou / (France) Irena Pavlovic, 6–2, 6–0
