= 2011 Q Hotel & Spa Women's Pro Tennis Classic – Singles =

Singles
- 2011 Q Hotel & Spa Women's Pro Tennis Classic

Final
- Champion: (United States) Varvara Lepchenko
- Runner-up: (Italy) Romina Oprandi
- Score: 6–4, 6–1

Events
Singles	Doubles
← 2010 ·	Q Hotel & Spa Women's Pro Tennis Classic	· 2012 →

Rebecca Marino was the defending champion, but chose not to participate.
Varvara Lepchenko won the title by defeating Romina Oprandi in the final 6–4, 6–1.

== Seeds ==
1. (United States) Varvara Lepchenko (champion)
2. (Italy) Romina Oprandi (final)
3. (United States) Jamie Hampton (semifinals)
4. (Russia) ~~Regina Kulikova~~ (withdrew)
5. (Canada) Sharon Fichman (first round)
6. (Croatia) Ajla Tomljanović (semifinals)
7. (United States) Alexa Glatch (second round)
8. (United States) Chichi Scholl (first round)

== Main draw ==
=== Key ===
- Q = Qualifier
- WC = Wild card
- LL = Lucky loser
- Alt = Alternate
- SE = Special exempt
- PR = Protected ranking
- ITF = ITF entry
- JE = Junior exempt
- w/o = Walkover
- r = Retired
- d = Defaulted
- SR = Special ranking

=== Finals ===
Semifinals
1	(United States) Varvara Lepchenko	6	6
6	(Croatia) Ajla Tomljanović	3	3
3	(United States) Jamie Hampton	3	6	3
2	(Italy) Romina Oprandi	6	4	6

Final
1	(United States) Varvara Lepchenko	6	6
2	(Italy) Romina Oprandi	4	1

=== Top half ===
First round
1	(United States) V Lepchenko	6	6
LL	(United States) B Morgan	3	1
LL	(Finland) P Suomalainen	6	6
WC	(United States) O Sneed	2	1
WC	(United States) M Sanchez	6^{1}	6	2
Q	(Canada) E Bouchard	7^{7}	1	6
(Russia) O Puchkova	7^{7}	6
8	(United States) C Scholl	6^{0}	3
LL	(Indonesia) R Tedjakusuma	4	6^{5}
Q	(Canada) M-È Pelletier	6	7^{7}
SR	(Venezuela) G Paz	7	6
(United States) A Fink	5	2
(Paraguay) V Cepede Royg	6	6
(Kazakhstan) S Karatantcheva	1	2
(Portugal) M Larcher de Brito	4	1
6	(Croatia) A Tomljanović	6	6

Second round
1	(United States) V Lepchenko	6	6
LL	(Finland) P Suomalainen	2	1
Q	(Canada) E Bouchard	2	3
(Russia) O Puchkova	6	6
Q	(Canada) M-È Pelletier	2	4
SR	(Venezuela) G Paz	6	6
(Paraguay) V Cepede Royg	7^{17}	3	2
6	(Croatia) A Tomljanović	6^{15}	6	6

Quarterfinals
1	(United States) V Lepchenko	6	7^{8}
(Russia) O Puchkova	4	6^{6}
SR	(Venezuela) G Paz	0	1^{r}
6	(Croatia) A Tomljanović	6	4

Semifinals
1	(United States) V Lepchenko	6	6
6	(Croatia) A Tomljanović	3	3

=== Bottom half ===
First round
5	(Canada) S Fichman	5	0
(United States) J Boserup	7	6
(Slovenia) P Rampre	3	2
(United States) M Brengle	6	6
(United States) A Rolle	3	2
(Germany) L Siegemund	6	6
(United States) A Stevenson	6	3	4
3	(United States) J Hampton	3	6	6
7	(United States) A Glatch	6	6
(United States) G Brodsky	2	4
(Hungary) T Babos	2	4
(Puerto Rico) M Puig	6	6
(United States) A Weinhold	6	7
WC	(United States) Y Schnack	2	5
Q	(United States) A Mueller	4	4
2	(Italy) R Oprandi	6	6

Second round
(United States) J Boserup	3	2
(United States) M Brengle	6	6
(Germany) L Siegemund	5	7^{8}	3
3	(United States) J Hampton	7	6^{6}	6
7	(United States) A Glatch	6^{4}	3
(Puerto Rico) M Puig	7^{7}	6
(United States) A Weinhold	3	2
2	(Italy) R Oprandi	6	6

Quarterfinals
(United States) M Brengle	6	3	3
3	(United States) J Hampton	4	6	6
(Puerto Rico) M Puig	4	2
2	(Italy) R Oprandi	6	6

Semifinals
3	(United States) J Hampton	3	6	3
2	(Italy) R Oprandi	6	4	6
