= 2011 Open GDF Suez Nantes Atlantique =

- Date: 31 October – 6 November
- Edition: 9th
- Location: Nantes, France

Champions

Singles
- (United States) Alison Riske

Doubles
- (France) Stéphanie Foretz Gacon / (France) Kristina Mladenovic
← 2010 ·	Open GDF Suez Nantes Atlantique	· 2012 →

The 2011 Open GDF Suez Nantes Atlantique was a professional tennis tournament played on hard courts. It was the ninth edition of the tournament which was part of the 2011 ITF Women's Circuit. It took place in Nantes, France between 31 October and 6 November 2011.

== WTA entrants ==
=== Seeds ===
Country	Player	Rank^{1}	Seed
FRA	Pauline Parmentier	66	1
GBR	Heather Watson	87	2
FRA	Alizé Cornet	94	3
FRA	Stéphanie Foretz Gacon	97	4
FRA	Iryna Brémond	100	5
RUS	Valeria Savinykh	116	6
ESP	Arantxa Parra Santonja	118	7
RUS	Alexandra Panova	122	8

- ^{1} Rankings are as of October 24, 2011.

=== Other entrants ===
The following players received wildcards into the singles main draw:

- (France) Julie Coin
- (France) Anaïs Laurendon
- (France) Chloé Paquet
- (France) Alice Tisset

The following players received entry from the qualifying draw:

- (France) Séverine Beltrame
- (Slovakia) Michaela Hončová
- (Croatia) Darija Jurak
- (Poland) Magda Linette

== Champions ==
=== Singles ===
(United States) Alison Riske def. (France) Iryna Brémond, 6–1, 6–4

=== Doubles ===
(France) Stéphanie Foretz Gacon / (France) Kristina Mladenovic def. (France) Julie Coin / (Czech Republic) Eva Hrdinová, 6–0, 6–4
