= 2011 Open GDF Suez de Touraine – Singles =

Singles
- 2011 Open GDF Suez de Touraine

Final
- Champion: (United States) Alison Riske
- Runner-up: (Uzbekistan) Akgul Amanmuradova
- Score: 2–6, 6–2, 7–5

Events
Singles	Doubles
← 2010 ·	Open GDF Suez de Touraine	· 2012 →

Alison Riske is the defending champion.
Riske successfully defended her title, defeating Akgul Amanmuradova in the final.

== Seeds ==
1. (Spain) Laura Pous Tió (second round)
2. (Czech Republic) Andrea Hlaváčková (quarterfinals)
3. (Russia) ~~Vesna Dolonts~~ (withdrew)
4. (Netherlands) Michaëlla Krajicek (semifinals)
5. (United States) Alison Riske (champion)
6. (Uzbekistan) Akgul Amanmuradova (final)
7. (Russia) Alexandra Panova (semifinals)
8. (Switzerland) Stefanie Vögele (second round)

== Main draw ==
=== Key ===
- Q = Qualifier
- WC = Wild card
- LL = Lucky loser
- Alt = Alternate
- SE = Special exempt
- PR = Protected ranking
- ITF = ITF entry
- JE = Junior exempt
- w/o = Walkover
- r = Retired
- d = Defaulted
- SR = Special ranking

=== Finals ===
Semifinals
7	(Russia) Alexandra Panova	5	7	3
6	(Uzbekistan) Akgul Amanmuradova	7	5	6
4	(Netherlands) Michaëlla Krajicek	1	5
5	(United States) Alison Riske	6	7

Final
6	(Uzbekistan) Akgul Amanmuradova	6	2	5
5	(United States) Alison Riske	2	6	7

=== Top half ===
First round
1	(Spain) L Pous Tió	6	4	6
(Croatia) A Mijačika	2	6	0
(Netherlands) K Bertens	6	6
(Netherlands) B Schoofs	3	4
Q	(Italy) A Remondina	7	2	6
(Poland) M Domachowska	5	6	1
(Slovakia) K Kučová	2	2
7	(Russia) A Panova	6	6
LL	(Slovakia) M Hončová	6	7
(Ukraine) O Savchuk	2	5
(Ukraine) A Bondarenko	7^{7}	6
(Italy) ME Camerin	6^{3}	2
WC	(France) I Pavlovic	7	6
WC	(France) A Bergot	5	3
(Israel) J Glushko	2	2
6	(Uzbekistan) A Amanmuradova	6	6

Second round
1	(Spain) L Pous Tió	3	4
(Netherlands) K Bertens	6	6
Q	(Italy) A Remondina	2	5
7	(Russia) A Panova	6	7
LL	(Slovakia) M Hončová	7^{7}	6^{2}	1
(Ukraine) A Bondarenko	6^{3}	7^{7}	6
WC	(France) I Pavlovic	4	6^{4}
6	(Uzbekistan) A Amanmuradova	6	7^{7}

Quarterfinals
(Netherlands) K Bertens	3	2
7	(Russia) A Panova	6	6
(Ukraine) A Bondarenko	3	5
6	(Uzbekistan) A Amanmuradova	6	7

Semifinals
7	(Russia) A Panova	5	7	3
6	(Uzbekistan) A Amanmuradova	7	5	6

=== Bottom half ===
First round
8	(Switzerland) S Vögele	6	6
WC	(France) A Laurendon	4	1
Q	(France) J Coin	7	6
(Luxembourg) A Kremer	5	0
Q	(France) C Sibille	7^{7}	4	4
(Bulgaria) E Kostova	6^{3}	6	6
(Czech Republic) R Voráčová	2	r
4	(Netherlands) M Krajicek	1
5	(United States) A Riske	6	6
(Germany) T Malek	3	4
Q	(France) L Brouleau	6	6
WC	(France) M Georges	3	4
(France) C Feuerstein	6	6
(Greece) E Georgatou	1	4
LL	(Uzbekistan) A Khabibulina	0	4
2	(Czech Republic) A Hlaváčková	6	6

Second round
8	(Switzerland) S Vögele	2	6	6^{5}
Q	(France) J Coin	6	3	7^{7}
(Bulgaria) E Kostova	5	4
4	(Netherlands) M Krajicek	7	6
5	(United States) A Riske	6	6
Q	(France) L Brouleau	2	0
(France) C Feuerstein	7^{9}	2	6^{3}
2	(Czech Republic) A Hlaváčková	6^{7}	6	7^{7}

Quarterfinals
Q	(France) J Coin	7^{7}	1	5
4	(Netherlands) M Krajicek	6^{3}	6	7
5	(United States) A Riske	6^{7}	6	6
2	(Czech Republic) A Hlaváčková	7^{9}	4	3

Semifinals
4	(Netherlands) M Krajicek	1	5
5	(United States) A Riske	6	7
