= Maria Abramović =

Croatian tennis player (born 1987)

- Country (sports): Croatia
- Residence: Zagreb, Croatia
- Born: 19 August 1987 (age 37); Zagreb, SR Croatia, Yugoslavia
- Turned pro: 2003
- Plays: Right (two-handed backhand)
- Prize money: $85,893

Singles
- Career record: 173–144
- Career titles: 0
- Highest ranking: No. 266 (11 June 2012)

Doubles
- Career record: 126–113
- Career titles: 7 ITF
- Highest ranking: No. 141 (11 June 2012)

Maria Abramović (Croatian pronunciation: [abrǎːmovitɕ]; born 19 August 1987) is a retired Croatian tennis player.

Abramović took part in the 2006 Bangalore Open but lost in the second round to Tatiana Poutchek. In her career, she won seven ITF titles. Her sister Ivana Abramović also played professional tennis on ITF Circuit and WTA Tour.

== ITF Circuit finals ==
Legend
$100,000 tournaments
$75,000 tournaments
$50,000 tournaments
$25,000 tournaments
$10,000 tournaments

=== Singles: 3 (3 runner-ups) ===
Result	No.	Date	Tournament	Surface	Opponent	Score
Loss	1.	9 November 2003	ITF Manila, Philippines	Clay	(Indonesia) Sandy Gumulya	6–1, 4–6, 1–6
Loss	2.	26 November 2006	ITF Puebla, Mexico	Hard	(Austria) Yvonne Meusburger	4–6, 2–6
Loss	3.	23 August 2009	ITF Vinkovci, Croatia	Clay	(Croatia) Ani Mijacika	2–6, 3–6

=== Doubles: 20 (7 titles, 13 runner-ups) ===
Result	No.	Date	Tournament	Surface	Partner	Opponents	Score
Loss	1.	6 November 2004	ITF Mumbai, India	Hard	(Czech Republic) Hana Šromová	(Uzbekistan) Akgul Amanmuradova (India) Sai Jayalakshmy Jayaram	6–4, 4–6, 4–6
Loss	2.	28 November 2004	ITF San Luis Potosí, Mexico	Hard	(Croatia) Ivana Abramović	(United Kingdom) Hannah Collin (United Kingdom) Karen Paterson	4–6, 6–2, 2–6
Win	1.	20 November 2005	ITF Puebla, Mexico	Hard	(Croatia) Ivana Abramović	(Argentina) Betina Jozami (Argentina) Veronica Spiegel	4–6, 6–4, 7–6^{(7–4)}
Loss	3.	9 April 2006	ITF Putignano, Italy	Hard	(Croatia) Ivana Abramović	(Australia) Anastasia Rodionova (Russia) Arina Rodionova	6–1, 1–6, 5–7
Loss	4.	19 November 2006	ITF Mexico City, Mexico	Clay	(Croatia) Ivana Abramović	(Brazil) Larissa Carvalho (Brazil) Joana Cortez	5–7, 2–6
Loss	5.	25 November 2006	ITF Puebla, Mexico	Hard	(Croatia) Ivana Abramović	(Brazil) Maria Fernanda Alves (Czech Republic) Hana Šromová	4–6, 3–6
Loss	6.	22 July 2007	ITF Dnipropetrovsk, Ukraine	Clay	(Croatia) Ivana Abramović	(Kazakhstan) Amina Rakhim (Russia) Arina Rodionova	5–7, 6–4, 2–6
Loss	7.	30 September 2007	Royal Cup, Montenegro	Clay	(Croatia) Ivana Abramović	(Montenegro) Danica Krstajić (Bosnia and Herzegovina) Sandra Martinović	1–6, 2–6
Loss	8.	28 October 2007	ITF Mexico City, Mexico	Hard	(Croatia) Ivana Abramović	(Netherlands) Arantxa Rus (Netherlands) Nicole Thyssen	0–6, 1–6
Loss	9.	6 September 2009	ITF Maribor, Slovenia	Clay	(Slovakia) Katarina Kachliková	(Croatia) Ani Mijacika (Croatia) Ana Vrljić	2–6, 3–6
Loss	10.	25 April 2010	ITF Šibenik, Croatia	Clay	(Romania) Mădălina Gojnea	(Romania) Alexandra Cadanțu (Bulgaria) Dalia Zafirova	2–6, 3–6
Win	2.	6 March 2011	ITF Lyon, France	Hard (i)	(Georgia (country)) Sofia Kvatsabaia	(Czech Republic) Martina Borecká (Czech Republic) Petra Krejsová	6–4, 3–6, [10–5]
Loss	11.	13 March 2011	ITF Dijon, France	Hard (i)	(Georgia (country)) Sofia Kvatsabaia	(Czech Republic) Martina Borecká (Czech Republic) Petra Krejsová	2–6, 4–6
Win	3.	28 May 2011	ITF Velenje, Slovenia	Clay	(Germany) Scarlett Werner	(Germany) Dejana Raickovic (Bulgaria) Dalia Zafirova	6–4, 6–4
Loss	12.	24 July 2011	ITF Les Contamines-Montjoie, France	Hard	(Italy) Nicole Clerico	(France) Julie Coin (Czech Republic) Eva Hrdinová	3–6, 2–6
Win	4.	31 July 2011	ITF Bad Saulgau, Germany	Clay	(Italy) Nicole Clerico	(Colombia) Catalina Castaño (Colombia) Mariana Duque-Marino	6–3, 5–7, [10–7]
Win	5.	4 September 2011	ITF Sarajevo, Bosnia and Herzegovina	Clay	(Croatia) Ana Vrljić	(Portugal) Maria Joao Koehler (Argentina) Florencia Molinero	5–7, 7–6^{(7–3)}, [10–4]
Loss	13.	16 September 2011	Zagreb Ladies Open, Croatia	Clay	(Romania) Mihaela Buzărnescu	(Portugal) Maria João Koehler (Hungary) Katalin Marosi	0–6, 3–6
Win	6.	9 October 2011	ITF Kansas City, United States	Hard	(Czech Republic) Eva Hrdinová	(United States) Jamie Hampton (Croatia) Ajla Tomljanović	2–6, 6–2, [10–4]
Win	7.	23 October 2011	ITF Rock Hill, United States	Hard	(Brazil) Roxane Vaisemberg	(United States) Madison Brengle (Venezuela) Gabriela Paz	3–6, 6–3, [10–5]
