= 2014 Monterrey Open – Singles =

Singles
- 2014 Monterrey Open

Final
- Champion: (Serbia) Ana Ivanovic
- Runner-up: (Serbia) Jovana Jakšić
- Score: 6–2, 6–1

Details
- Draw: 32
- Seeds: 8

Events
Singles	Doubles
- Monterrey Open

Anastasia Pavlyuchenkova was the defending champion, but she chose not to participate this year.

Ana Ivanovic won her second title of the year, defeating fellow Serbian Jovana Jakšić 6–2, 6–1 in the final, the first (and to date only) all-Serbian final on the WTA tour.

== Seeds ==
1. (Italy) Flavia Pennetta (first round)
2. (Serbia) Ana Ivanovic (champion)
3. (Denmark) Caroline Wozniacki (semifinals)
4. (Belgium) Kirsten Flipkens (first round)

5. (Spain) Garbiñe Muguruza (first round)
6. (Slovakia) Magdaléna Rybáriková (quarterfinals)
7. (Italy) Karin Knapp (first round)
8. (Puerto Rico) Monica Puig (quarterfinals)

== Draw ==
Key

- Q = Qualifier
- WC = Wild card
- LL = Lucky loser
- Alt = Alternate
- ITF = ITF entry
- PR = Protected ranking
- SR = Special ranking
- SE = Special exempt
- JE = Junior exempt
- JR = Junior Accelerator Programme entrant
- CO = College Accelerator Programme entrant
- NG = Next Gen Accelerator Program entrant
- w/o = Walkover
- r = Retired
- d = Defaulted

=== Finals ===
Semifinals
(Japan) Kimiko Date-Krumm	7^{7}	4	4
(Serbia) Jovana Jakšić	6^{5}	6	6
3	(Denmark) Caroline Wozniacki	6^{5}	4
2	(Serbia) Ana Ivanovic	7^{7}	6

Final
(Serbia) Jovana Jakšić	2	1
2	(Serbia) Ana Ivanovic	6	6

=== Top half ===
First round
1	(Italy) F Pennetta	5	2
(Japan) K Date-Krumm	7	6
WC	(Mexico) X Hermoso	1	2
(Hungary) T Babos	6	6
(United States) N Gibbs	6	6
(Czech Republic) A Hlaváčková	3	4
(Russia) O Puchkova	0	3
8	(Puerto Rico) M Puig	6	6
4/WC	(Belgium) K Flipkens	4	6	2
Q	(United States) J Boserup	6	1	6
(United States) A Kiick	6	6
(Slovenia) T Majerič	4	3
Q	(Thailand) L Kumkhum	7	6
Q	(Slovenia) D Jakupović	5	0
(Serbia) J Jakšić	6	6
7	(Italy) K Knapp	3	4

Second round
(Japan) K Date-Krumm	6	6^{4}	6
(Hungary) T Babos	4	7^{7}	4
(United States) N Gibbs	4	2
8	(Puerto Rico) M Puig	6	6
Q	(United States) J Boserup	2	6	6
(United States) A Kiick	6	2	1
Q	(Thailand) L Kumkhum	6	6^{5}	6^{2}
(Serbia) J Jakšić	3	7^{7}	7^{7}

Quarterfinals
(Japan) K Date-Krumm	6	6^{2}	6
8	(Puerto Rico) M Puig	4	7^{7}	4
Q	(United States) J Boserup	3	0
(Serbia) J Jakšić	6	6

Semifinals
(Japan) K Date-Krumm	7^{7}	4	4
(Serbia) J Jakšić	6^{5}	6	6

=== Bottom half ===
First round
5	(Spain) G Muguruza	6^{5}	6^{2}
(Croatia) D Vekić	7^{7}	7^{7}
(Israel) S Pe'er	3	3
(Czech Republic) Ka Plíšková	6	6
(France) K Mladenovic	6	6
(United Kingdom) J Konta	4	2
(United States) C Vandeweghe	3	6^{4}
3	(Denmark) C Wozniacki	6	7^{7}
6	(Slovakia) M Rybáriková	6	3	6
(Belarus) O Govortsova	3	6	2
(Romania) M Niculescu	4	6	6^{1}
(Japan) A Morita	6	3	7^{7}
Q	(Canada) A Wozniak	3	6	6
WC	(Mexico) M Zacarías	6	0	1
(Poland) U Radwańska	6	3	3
2	(Serbia) A Ivanovic	4	6	6

Second round
(Croatia) D Vekić	6	2	3
(Czech Republic) Ka Plíšková	4	6	6
(France) K Mladenovic	3	4
3	(Denmark) C Wozniacki	6	6
6	(Slovakia) M Rybáriková	6	0
(Japan) A Morita	4	0^{r}
Q	(Canada) A Wozniak	4	2
2	(Serbia) A Ivanovic	6	6

Quarterfinals
(Czech Republic) Ka Plíšková	7^{7}	3	3
3	(Denmark) C Wozniacki	6^{3}	6	6
6	(Slovakia) M Rybáriková	1	6	2
2	(Serbia) A Ivanovic	6	0	6

Semifinals
3	(Denmark) C Wozniacki	6^{5}	4
2	(Serbia) A Ivanovic	7^{7}	6

== Qualifying ==
=== Seeds ===
1. (Thailand) Luksika Kumkhum (qualified)
2. (Russia) Alexandra Panova (first round)
3. (Canada) Aleksandra Wozniak (qualified)
4. (Venezuela) Adriana Pérez (qualifying competition)
5. (United States) Sachia Vickery (qualifying competition)
6. (Estonia) Anett Kontaveit (first round)
7. (Canada) Gabriela Dabrowski (qualifying competition)
8. (France) Amandine Hesse (second round)

=== Qualifiers ===
1. (Thailand) Luksika Kumkhum
2. (United States) Julia Boserup
3. (Canada) Aleksandra Wozniak
4. (Slovenia) Dalila Jakupovič

=== Qualifying draw ===
==== First qualifier ====
First round
1	(Thailand) Luksika Kumkhum	6	6
WC	(Mexico) Alejandra Cisneros	4	0
(Mexico) Victoria Rodríguez	3	6	6
(Mexico) Carolina Betancourt	6	3	3
WC	(Mexico) Camila Fuentes	3	6	4
(Poland) Marta Domachowska	6	4	6
(France) Irina Ramialison	6	6^{0}	2
5	(United States) Sachia Vickery	3	7^{7}	6

Second round
1	(Thailand) Luksika Kumkhum	7	6
(Mexico) Victoria Rodríguez	5	0
(Poland) Marta Domachowska	2	6^{4}
5	(United States) Sachia Vickery	6	7^{7}

Qualifying competition
1	(Thailand) Luksika Kumkhum	6	6
5	(United States) Sachia Vickery	3	1

==== Second qualifier ====
First round
2	(Russia) Alexandra Panova	5	3
(United States) Julia Boserup	7	6
(Belgium) Ysaline Bonaventure	6^{5}	6	2
(Georgia (country)) Oksana Kalashnikova	7^{7}	3	6
(Italy) Gioia Barbieri	2	6	7
(United States) Maria Sanchez	6	2	5
(Bulgaria) Elitsa Kostova	6^{0}	4
7	(Canada) Gabriela Dabrowski	7^{7}	6

Second round
(United States) Julia Boserup	6	6
(Georgia (country)) Oksana Kalashnikova	0	1
(Italy) Gioia Barbieri	6^{3}	6^{1}
7	(Canada) Gabriela Dabrowski	7^{7}	7^{7}

Qualifying competition
(United States) Julia Boserup	6	7
7	(Canada) Gabriela Dabrowski	4	5

==== Third qualifier ====
First round
3	(Canada) Aleksandra Wozniak	6	7^{7}
(United States) Chieh-Yu Hsu	1	6^{5}
WC	(Mexico) Ana Paula de la Peña	2	1
(France) Constance Sibille	6	6
(United States) Allie Will	5	6	1
(United States) Alexandra Stevenson	7	4	6
(Canada) Heidi El Tabakh	6	6
6	(Estonia) Anett Kontaveit	4	4

Second round
3	(Canada) Aleksandra Wozniak	7	7^{9}
(France) Constance Sibille	5	6^{7}
(United States) Alexandra Stevenson	6	4	4
(Canada) Heidi El Tabakh	4	6	6

Qualifying competition
3	(Canada) Aleksandra Wozniak	4	6	6
(Canada) Heidi El Tabakh	6	3	2

==== Fourth qualifier ====
First round
4	(Venezuela) Adriana Pérez	7^{7}	6
(Japan) Miki Miyamura	6^{2}	0
(United States) Nicole Melichar	7^{8}	2	5
(United Kingdom) Jade Windley	6^{6}	6	7
(Slovenia) Dalila Jakupovič	6	6
WC	(Mexico) Jessica Cortés	3	0
(United States) Asia Muhammad	3	4
8	(France) Amandine Hesse	6	6

Second round
4	(Venezuela) Adriana Pérez	6	6
(United Kingdom) Jade Windley	1	2
(Slovenia) Dalila Jakupovič	6	6
8	(France) Amandine Hesse	1	4

Qualifying competition
4	(Venezuela) Adriana Pérez	2	4
(Slovenia) Dalila Jakupovič	6	6
