= 2014 Monterrey Open – Doubles =

Doubles
- 2014 Monterrey Open

Final
- Champions: (Croatia) Darija Jurak (United States) Megan Moulton-Levy
- Runners-up: (Hungary) Tímea Babos (Belarus) Olga Govortsova
- Score: 7–6^{(7–5)}, 3–6, [11–9]

Details
- Draw: 16
- Seeds: 4

Events
Singles	Doubles
← 2013 ·	Monterrey Open	· 2015 →

Tímea Babos and Kimiko Date-Krumm were the defending champions, but chose not to participate together. Babos played alongside Olga Govortsova, while Date-Krumm teamed up with Karolína Plíšková. The two teams were scheduled to meet in the semifinals, but Date-Krumm withdrew with a right leg injury.

Darija Jurak and Megan Moulton-Levy won the title, defeating Babos and Govortsova in the final, 7–6^{(7–5)}, 3–6, [11–9].

== Seeds ==
1. (Hungary) Tímea Babos / (Belarus) Olga Govortsova (final)
2. (Canada) Gabriela Dabrowski / (Georgia (country)) Oksana Kalashnikova (semifinals)
3. (Croatia) Darija Jurak / (United States) Megan Moulton-Levy (champions)
4. (Japan) Kimiko Date-Krumm / (Czech Republic) Karolína Plíšková (semifinals, withdrew)

== Draw ==
=== Key ===
- Q = Qualifier
- WC = Wild card
- LL = Lucky loser
- Alt = Alternate
- SE = Special exempt
- PR = Protected ranking
- ITF = ITF entry
- JE = Junior exempt
- w/o = Walkover
- r = Retired
- d = Defaulted
- SR = Special ranking

=== Draw ===
First round
1	(Hungary) T Babos (Belarus) O Govortsova	6	4	[13]
(France) K Mladenovic (Russia) A Panova	3	6	[11]
(United States) A Muhammad (United States) A Will	7^{7}	7
(Latvia) L Dekmeijere (Czech Republic) N Fraňková	6^{3}	5
4	(Japan) K Date-Krumm (Czech Republic) K Plíšková	6	6
(Thailand) L Kumkhum (Japan) M Miyamura	3	3
(United States) M Sanchez (United States) C Vandeweghe	6	6^{5}	[10]
(Chinese Taipei) C-j Chuang (Czech Republic) E Hrdinová	3	7^{7}	[5]
WC	(Mexico) V Rodríguez (Mexico) M Zacarías	2	7	[8]
(United States) N Melichar (United Kingdom) J Windley	6	5	[10]
(Canada) H El Tabakh (United States) A Kiick	5	6	[7]
3	(Croatia) D Jurak (United States) M Moulton-Levy	7	4	[10]
(Bulgaria) E Kostova (Venezuela) A Pérez	3	3
(France) A Hesse (United States) C-Y Hsu	6	6
WC	(Mexico) A Cisneros (Mexico) C Fuentes	5	6	[7]
2	(Canada) G Dabrowski (Georgia (country)) O Kalashnikova	7	1	[10]

Quarterfinals
1	(Hungary) T Babos (Belarus) O Govortsova	7	7
(United States) A Muhammad (United States) A Will	5	5
4	(Japan) K Date-Krumm (Czech Republic) K Plíšková	7^{7}	6
(United States) M Sanchez (United States) C Vandeweghe	6^{5}	3
(United States) N Melichar (United Kingdom) J Windley	5	3
3	(Croatia) D Jurak (United States) M Moulton-Levy	7	6
(France) A Hesse (United States) C-Y Hsu	4	2
2	(Canada) G Dabrowski (Georgia (country)) O Kalashnikova	6	6

Semifinals
1	(Hungary) T Babos (Belarus) O Govortsova	w/o
4	(Japan) K Date-Krumm (Czech Republic) K Plíšková
3	(Croatia) D Jurak (United States) M Moulton-Levy	4	6	[10]
2	(Canada) G Dabrowski (Georgia (country)) O Kalashnikova	6	4	[8]

Final
1	(Hungary) T Babos (Belarus) O Govortsova	6^{5}	6	[9]
3	(Croatia) D Jurak (United States) M Moulton-Levy	7^{7}	3	[11]
