= 2013 Monterrey Open – Singles =

Singles
- 2013 Monterrey Open

Final
- Champion: (Russia) Anastasia Pavlyuchenkova
- Runner-up: (Germany) Angelique Kerber
- Score: 4–6, 6–2, 6–4

Details
- Draw: 32
- Seeds: 8

Events
Singles	Doubles
- Monterrey Open

Tímea Babos was the defending champion, but lost in the quarterfinals to Monica Niculescu.

Anastasia Pavlyuchenkova won the title, defeating Angelique Kerber in the final 4–6, 6–2, 6–4.

== Seeds ==
1. (Germany) Angelique Kerber (final)
2. (France) Marion Bartoli (first round)
3. (Russia) Maria Kirilenko (semifinals)
4. (Serbia) Ana Ivanovic (second round)
5. (Russia) Anastasia Pavlyuchenkova (champion)
6. (Belgium) Yanina Wickmayer (second round)
7. (Poland) Urszula Radwańska (quarterfinals)
8. (Japan) Ayumi Morita (quarterfinals)

== Draw ==
Key

- Q = Qualifier
- WC = Wild card
- LL = Lucky loser
- Alt = Alternate
- ITF = ITF entry
- PR = Protected ranking
- SR = Special ranking
- SE = Special exempt
- JE = Junior exempt
- JR = Junior Accelerator Programme entrant
- CO = College Accelerator Programme entrant
- NG = Next Gen Accelerator Program entrant
- w/o = Walkover
- r = Retired
- d = Defaulted

=== Finals ===
Semifinals
1	(Germany) Angelique Kerber	6	2	6
3	(Russia) Maria Kirilenko	4	6	2
(Romania) Monica Niculescu	6	2	4
5	(Russia) Anastasia Pavlyuchenkova	3	6	6

Final
1	(Germany) Angelique Kerber	6	2	4
5	(Russia) Anastasia Pavlyuchenkova	4	6	6

=== Top half ===
First round
1	(Germany) A Kerber	6	6
Q	(United States) S Crawford	3	3
Q	(Russia) A Kudryavtseva	6	6
(Czech Republic) E Birnerová	4	3
(Kazakhstan) G Voskoboeva	6	3	6
(Greece) E Daniilidou	3	6	3
(Slovakia) J Čepelová	0	1
8	(Japan) A Morita	6	6
3	(Russia) M Kirilenko	7	6
WC	(Mexico) X Hermoso	5	1
(Russia) V Dushevina	6	6^{4}	6^{2}
Q	(Serbia) J Jakšić	4	7^{7}	7^{7}
(United States) J Cohen	0	4
(Croatia) D Vekić	6	6
(United States) M Sanchez	2	6	2
7	(Poland) U Radwańska	6	2	6

Second round
1	(Germany) A Kerber	6	4	6
Q	(Russia) A Kudryavtseva	4	6	2
(Kazakhstan) G Voskoboeva	4	6^{3}
8	(Japan) A Morita	6	7^{7}
3	(Russia) M Kirilenko	6	4	6
Q	(Serbia) J Jakšić	0	6	1
(Croatia) D Vekić	4	1
7	(Poland) U Radwańska	6	6

Quarterfinals
1	(Germany) A Kerber	6	6
8	(Japan) A Morita	2	1
3	(Russia) M Kirilenko	6	6
7	(Poland) U Radwańska	1	4

Semifinals
1	(Germany) A Kerber	6	2	6
3	(Russia) M Kirilenko	4	6	2

=== Bottom half ===
First round
6	(Belgium) Y Wickmayer	4	6	6
(Russia) V Savinykh	6	1	4
(Romania) M Niculescu	6	2
(Japan) K Date-Krumm	3	1^{r}
(Hungary) T Babos	6	6
WC	(Mexico) AS Sánchez	3	3
(Russia) M Sirotkina	0	0
4/WC	(Serbia) A Ivanovic	6	6
5	(Russia) A Pavlyuchenkova	6	6
(Russia) N Bratchikova	4	0
(Russia) D Gavrilova	4	2
Q	(Croatia) T Mrdeža	6	6
(Russia) O Puchkova	2	0^{r}
(United States) L Davis	6	0
(United States) C Vandeweghe	4	6	6
2	(France) M Bartoli	6	3	1

Second round
6	(Belgium) Y Wickmayer	4	6	1
(Romania) M Niculescu	6	3	6
(Hungary) T Babos	7	3	6
4/WC	(Serbia) A Ivanovic	5	6	2
5	(Russia) A Pavlyuchenkova	6	6
Q	(Croatia) T Mrdeža	1	1
(United States) L Davis	6	7^{10}
(United States) C Vandeweghe	4	6^{8}

Quarterfinals
(Romania) M Niculescu	7	6
(Hungary) T Babos	5	2
5	(Russia) A Pavlyuchenkova	6	7
(United States) L Davis	2	5

Semifinals
(Romania) M Niculescu	6	2	4
5	(Russia) A Pavlyuchenkova	3	6	6

== Qualifying ==
=== Seeds ===
1. (Thailand) Luksika Kumkhum (first round)
2. (Spain) Laura Pous Tió (second round)
3. (Canada) Stéphanie Dubois (qualifying competition)
4. (Croatia) Tereza Mrdeža (qualified)
5. (Thailand) Tamarine Tanasugarn (first round)
6. (Israel) Julia Glushko (second round)
7. (Ukraine) Olga Savchuk (first round)
8. (Russia) Alla Kudryavtseva (qualified)

=== Qualifiers ===
1. (Serbia) Jovana Jakšić
2. (United States) Samantha Crawford
3. (Russia) Alla Kudryavtseva
4. (Croatia) Tereza Mrdeža

=== Draw ===
==== First qualifier ====
First round
1	(Thailand) Luksika Kumkhum	5	3
(Slovakia) Lenka Wienerová	7	6
(United States) Sachia Vickery	3	7	3
(Serbia) Jovana Jakšić	6	5	6
(Argentina) María Irigoyen	6	6
(France) Alizé Lim	3	3
(Canada) Gabriela Dabrowski	6	6
5	(Thailand) Tamarine Tanasugarn	1	2

Second round
(Slovakia) Lenka Wienerová	1	1
(Serbia) Jovana Jakšić	6	6
(Argentina) María Irigoyen	6	6
(Canada) Gabriela Dabrowski	1	2

Qualifying competition
(Serbia) Jovana Jakšić	4	6	6
(Argentina) María Irigoyen	6	3	4

==== Second qualifier ====
First round
2	(Spain) Laura Pous Tió	6	7^{7}
(United States) Asia Muhammad	3	6^{5}
(Thailand) Noppawan Lertcheewakarn	3	1
(United States) Alexandra Stevenson	6	6
(Austria) Nicole Rottmann	3	2
(United States) Samantha Crawford	6	6
(Chile) Cecilia Costa Melgar	0	4
6	(Israel) Julia Glushko	6	6

Second round
2	(Spain) Laura Pous Tió	6^{2}	3
(United States) Alexandra Stevenson	7^{7}	6
(United States) Samantha Crawford	7	6
6	(Israel) Julia Glushko	5	3

Qualifying competition
(United States) Alexandra Stevenson	6	6^{5}	1
(United States) Samantha Crawford	0	7^{7}	6

==== Third qualifier ====
First round
3	(Canada) Stéphanie Dubois	7	6
(Ukraine) Alyona Sotnikova	5	4
WC	(Mexico) Carolina Betancourt	4	3
(Venezuela) Adriana Pérez	6	6
(Brazil) Maria Fernanda Alves	6	6
WC	(Mexico) Sarai Delfina Monarrez Yesaki	2	0
(Argentina) Mailen Auroux	5	3
8	(Russia) Alla Kudryavtseva	7	6

Second round
3	(Canada) Stéphanie Dubois	6	6
(Venezuela) Adriana Pérez	4	3
(Brazil) Maria Fernanda Alves	6^{3}	6^{6}
8	(Russia) Alla Kudryavtseva	7^{7}	7^{8}

Qualifying competition
3	(Canada) Stéphanie Dubois	3	3
8	(Russia) Alla Kudryavtseva	6	6

==== Fourth qualifier ====
First round
4	(Croatia) Tereza Mrdeža	0	6	6
(France) Laura Thorpe	6	3	2
WC	(United Kingdom) Jennifer Allan	1	3
(United States) Nicole Melichar	6	6
(United States) Allie Will	6	6
(Russia) Margarita Lazareva	2	0
WC	(Mexico) Marcela Zacarías	7	7
7	(Ukraine) Olga Savchuk	5	5

Second round
4	(Croatia) Tereza Mrdeža	6	6
(United States) Nicole Melichar	2	2
(United States) Allie Will	6	6
WC	(Mexico) Marcela Zacarías	2	2

Qualifying competition
4	(Croatia) Tereza Mrdeža	6	6
(United States) Allie Will	1	1
