= 2013 Garanti Koza WTA Tournament of Champions =

- Date: 29 October – 3 November
- Edition: 5th
- Category: WTA Tournament of Champions
- Surface: Hard / indoor
- Location: Sofia, Bulgaria
- Venue: Arena Armeec

Champions

Singles
- (Romania) Simona Halep
- WTA Tournament of Champions

The 2013 Garanti Koza WTA Tournament of Champions was a singles-only tennis tournament that was played on indoor hard courts. The tournament was sponsored by Turkish construction firm Garanti Koza (the first year of a two-year deal). It was the fifth edition of the tournament and was part of the 2013 WTA Tour. The 2013 edition was the second to be held in Sofia at the Arena Armeec. The tournament was played between 29 October and 3 November 2013. Nadia Petrova was the defending champion, but she did not qualify this year, nor did she receive a wildcard into the event.

== Tournament ==
The 2013 Garanti Koza WTA Tournament of Champions was the fifth edition of the event and the second to take place in Sofia. The tournament is run by the Women's Tennis Association (WTA) and is part of the 2013 WTA Tour. It is the season ending championships for players who have won one of the WTA International tournaments but have not qualified for the WTA Championships. The Tournament consisted of a singles draw of eight players (including two Wild Cards, if applicable) in a round robin format determined by the WTA.

=== Format ===
The singles event featured eight players in a round robin event, split into two groups of four. Over the first four days of competition, each player met the other three players in their group, with the top two in each group advancing to the semifinals. The first-placed player in one group met the second-placed player in the other group, and vice versa. The winners of each semifinal met in the championship match.

==== Round robin tie-breaking methods ====
The final standings of each group shall be determined by the first of the following methods that apply:

1. Greatest number of wins
2. Greatest number of matches played; or
3. Head-to-head results if only two players are tied, or if three players are tied then:

a If three players each have the same number of wins, a player having played less than all three matches is automatically eliminated and the player advancing to the single elimination competition is the winner of the match-up of the two remaining tied players; or
b Highest percentage of sets won; or
c Highest percentage of games won

== Prize money and points ==
The total prize money for the 2013 Garanti Koza WTA Tournament of Champions was 750,000 United States dollars.

| Stage | Singles | Points ^{1} |
|---|---|---|
| Champion | RR^{2} + 190,000 | RR^{2} + 195 |
| Runner-up | RR^{2} + 65,000 | RR^{2} + 75 |
| Semifinalist | RR^{2} + 10,000 | RR^{2} |
| Round Robin (3 wins) | 80,000 | 180 |
| Round Robin (2 wins) | 65,000 | 145 |
| Round Robin (1 win) | 50,000 | 110 |
| Round Robin (0 wins) | 35,000 | 75 |
| Alternate | 7,500^{3} | 0 |

- ^{1} for every match played in the round robin a player gets 25 points automatically, and for each round robin win they get 35 additional points
- ^{2} RR means Prize money or Points won in the Round Robin Round.
- ^{3} Alternates receive $7,500 in prize money, even if they do not participate.

== Qualifying ==
The six highest-ranked players who have captured at least one International tournament during the year and who are not participating in singles at the year-end WTA Championships in Istanbul or the finals of the Fed Cup will automatically qualify for the event, plus two wildcards.

=== 2013 WTA International tournaments champions ===
| Player | Nationality | Tournament/s Won |
|---|---|---|
| Agnieszka Radwańska | POL | (New Zealand) Auckland (South Korea) Seoul |
| Li Na | CHN | (China) Shenzhen |
| Elena Vesnina | RUS | (Australia) Hobart |
| Maria Kirilenko | RUS | (Thailand) Pattaya |
| Jelena Janković | SRB | (Colombia) Bogotá |
| Marina Erakovic | NZL | (United States) Memphis |
| Sara Errani | ITA | (Mexico) Acapulco |
| Karolína Plíšková | CZE | (Malaysia) Kuala Lumpur |
| Monica Niculescu | ROU | (Brazil) Florianópolis |
| Anastasia Pavlyuchenkova | RUS | (Mexico) Monterrey (Portugal) Oeiras |
| Roberta Vinci | ITA | (Poland) Katowice (Italy) Palermo |
| Francesca Schiavone | ITA | (Morocco) Marrakesh |
| Alizé Cornet | FRA | (France) Strasbourg |
| Simona Halep | ROU | (Germany) Nürnberg (Netherlands) 's-Hertogenbosch (Hungary) Budapest |
| Daniela Hantuchová | SVK | (United Kingdom) Birmingham |
| Yvonne Meusburger | AUT | (Austria) Bad Gastein |
| Serena Williams | USA | (Sweden) Båstad |
| Elina Svitolina | UKR | (Azerbaijan) Baku |
| Magdaléna Rybáriková | SVK | (United States) Washington D.C. |
| Bojana Jovanovski | SRB | (Uzbekistan) Tashkent |
| Lucie Šafářová | CZE | (Canada) Quebec City |
| Zhang Shuai | CHN | (China) Guangzhou |
| Samantha Stosur | AUS | (Japan) Osaka |
| Angelique Kerber | GER | (Austria) Linz |
| Caroline Wozniacki | DEN | Luxembourg |

=== Qualifiers ===
WTA singles rankings (21 October 2013)
| Sd | Player | Rk | Won |
| | (Denmark) Caroline Wozniacki* | 10 | Luxembourg |
| | (Italy) Roberta Vinci* | 13 | (Poland) Katowice (Italy) Palermo |
| 1 | (Romania) Simona Halep | 14 | (Germany) Nürnberg (Netherlands) 's-Hertogenbosch (Hungary) Budapest |
| 2 | (Serbia) Ana Ivanovic | 16 | Wildcard |
| 3 | (Russia) Maria Kirilenko | 18 | (Thailand) Pattaya City |
| 4 | (Australia) Samantha Stosur | 19 | (Japan) Osaka |
| 5 | (Russia) Elena Vesnina | 25 | (Australia) Hobart |
| 6 | (Russia) Anastasia Pavlyuchenkova | 26 | (Mexico) Monterrey (Portugal) Oeiras |
| 7 | (France) Alizé Cornet | 27 | (France) Strasbourg |
| 8 | (Bulgaria) Tsvetana Pironkova | 118 | Wildcard |
| Alt | (Ukraine) Elina Svitolina | 40 | (Azerbaijan) Baku |

Caroline Wozniacki

Wozniacki qualified with victory in the final international series event of the season in Luxembourg. The Dane decided, although she would be the number one seed, not to compete and instead only focus her attentions on being an alternate at the WTA Championships.

Roberta Vinci

Vinci qualified by winning two international series tournaments, in Katowice and Palermo, respectively, but decided to compete in the Fed Cup final instead.

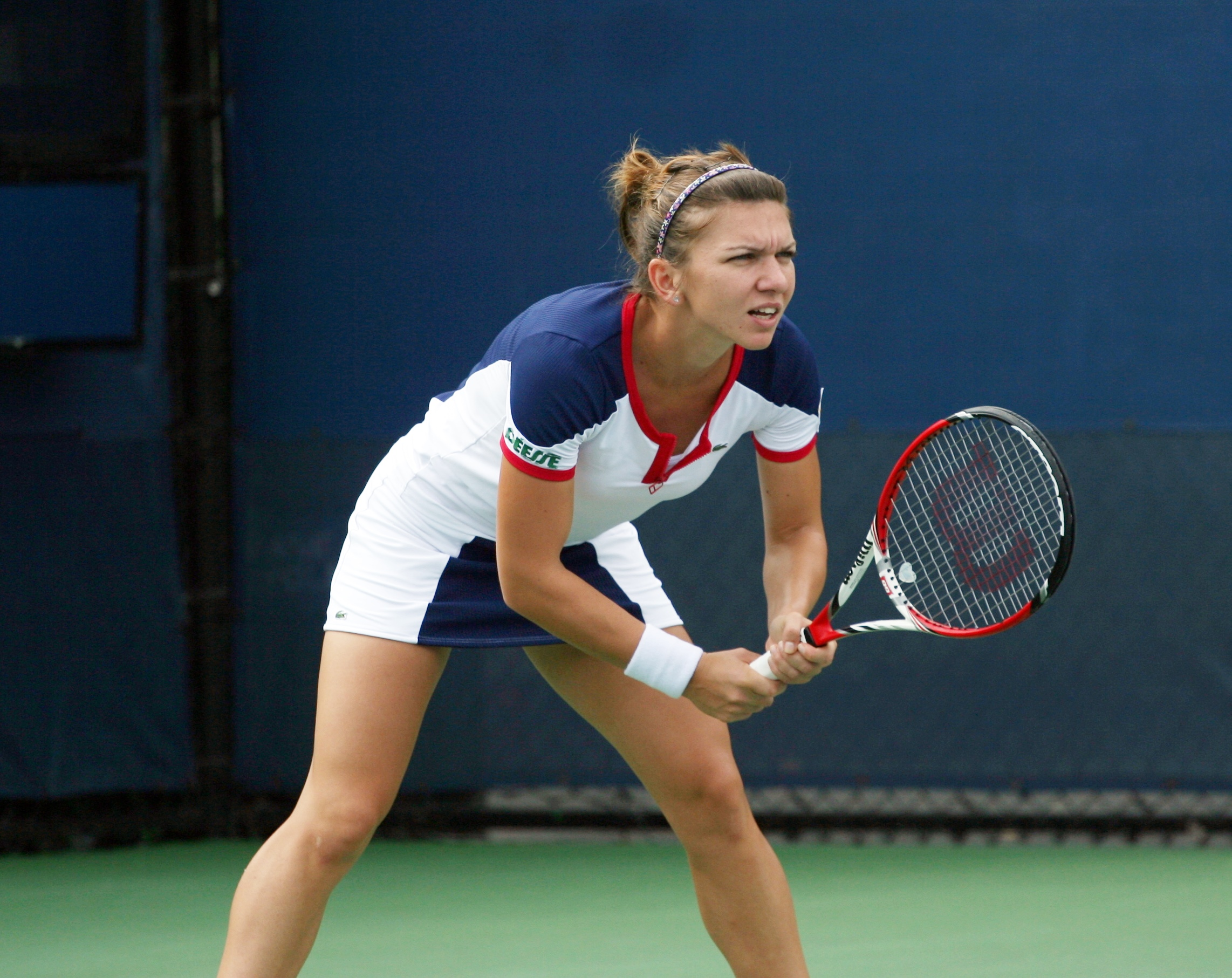
Simona Halep cracked into the top 15 for the first time.

Simona Halep

Halep is having a breakthrough year, entering the top 15 and winning her first title after previously losing three finals between 2010 and 2012. The Romanian won an impressive number of five titles in the year. The first was on the Nürnberger Versicherungscup defeating German Andrea Petkovic 6–3, 6–3, which gave her entry to the event. The following week she claimed the title on the grass courts of the Topshelf Open defeating Kirsten Flipkens 6–4, 6–2. Halep claimed her third title at the Budapest Grand Prix defeating Austrian Yvonne Meusburger in three sets 6–3, 6–7^{(7–9)}, 6–1. She won her biggest title so far at the New Haven Open at Yale her first Premier title defeating Petra Kvitová 6–2, 6–2. Halep also reached the semifinals Internazionali BNL d'Italia as a qualifier, but lost to world no. 1 Serena Williams. She also lost to Serena Williams at the quarterfinals of the Western & Southern Open, again in straight sets. On 20 October 2013, just before the Garanti Koza in Sofia, she won her fifth title of the year and the second Premier, beating Samantha Stosur 7–6 6–2 at the Kremlin Cup in Moscow. Simona Halep is making her debut at the event.

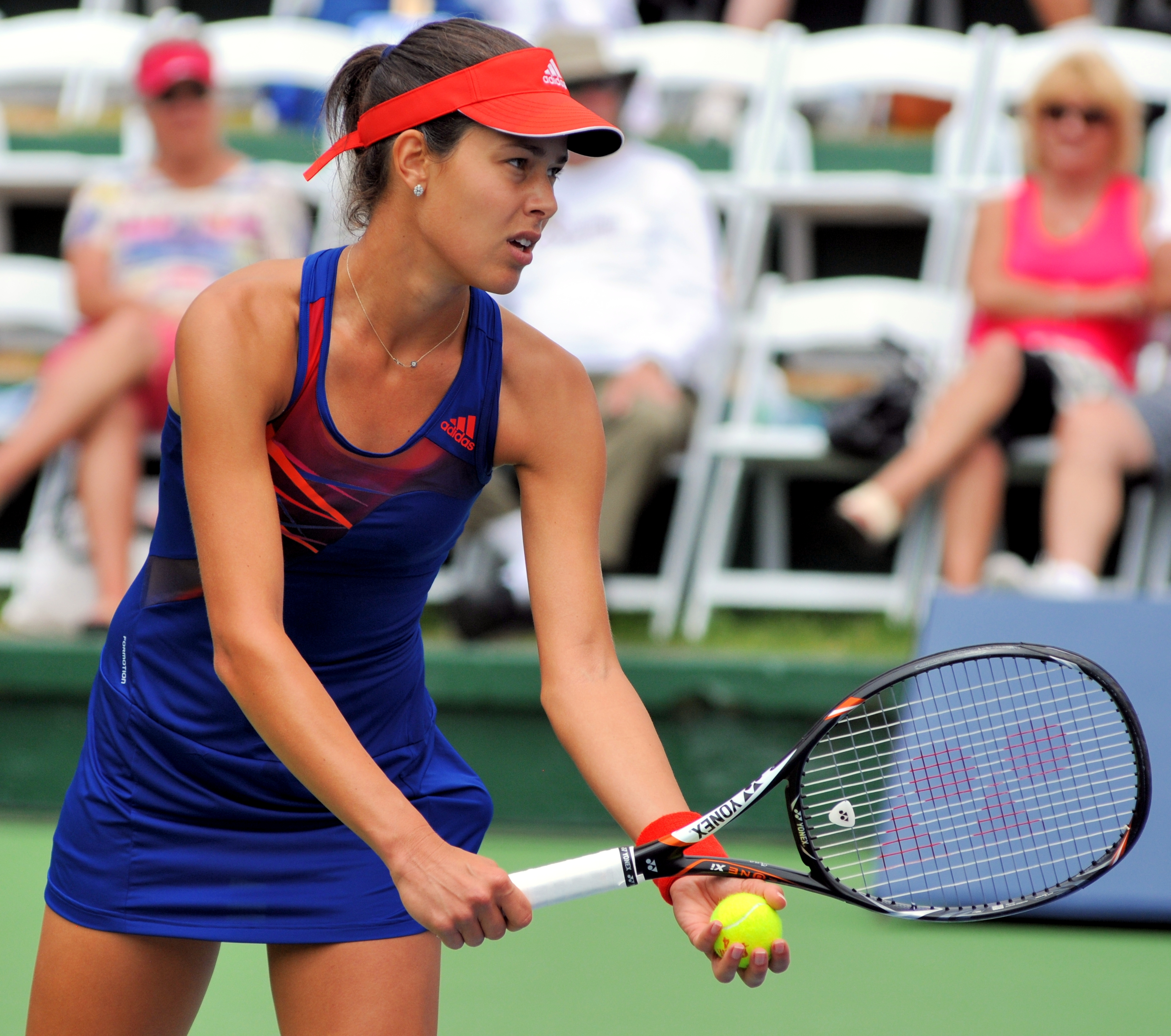
Ana Ivanovic is a two-time champion.

Ana Ivanovic

Ivanovic was one of the wildcard recipients. Ivanovic reached the semifinals of the Mutua Madrid Open a Premier Mandatory event, losing to Maria Sharapova 4–6, 3–6. She also reached the semifinals of the Southern California Open losing to Victoria Azarenka 0–6, 6–4, 3–6. She reached her first final of the year at the Generali Ladies Linz losing to German Angelique Kerber 4–6, 6–7^{(6–8)}. At the slams, Ivanovic reached the fourth round of the Australian Open and French Open, losing to Agnieszka Radwańska 2–6, 4–6 on both occasions. Ivanovic lost to Eugenie Bouchard in the second round of Wimbledon 3–6, 3–6. At the final slam of the year, at the US Open, she lost in the fourth round to Victoria Azarenka 6–4, 3–6, 4–6. She is making her third appearance to the event, having won the event twice.

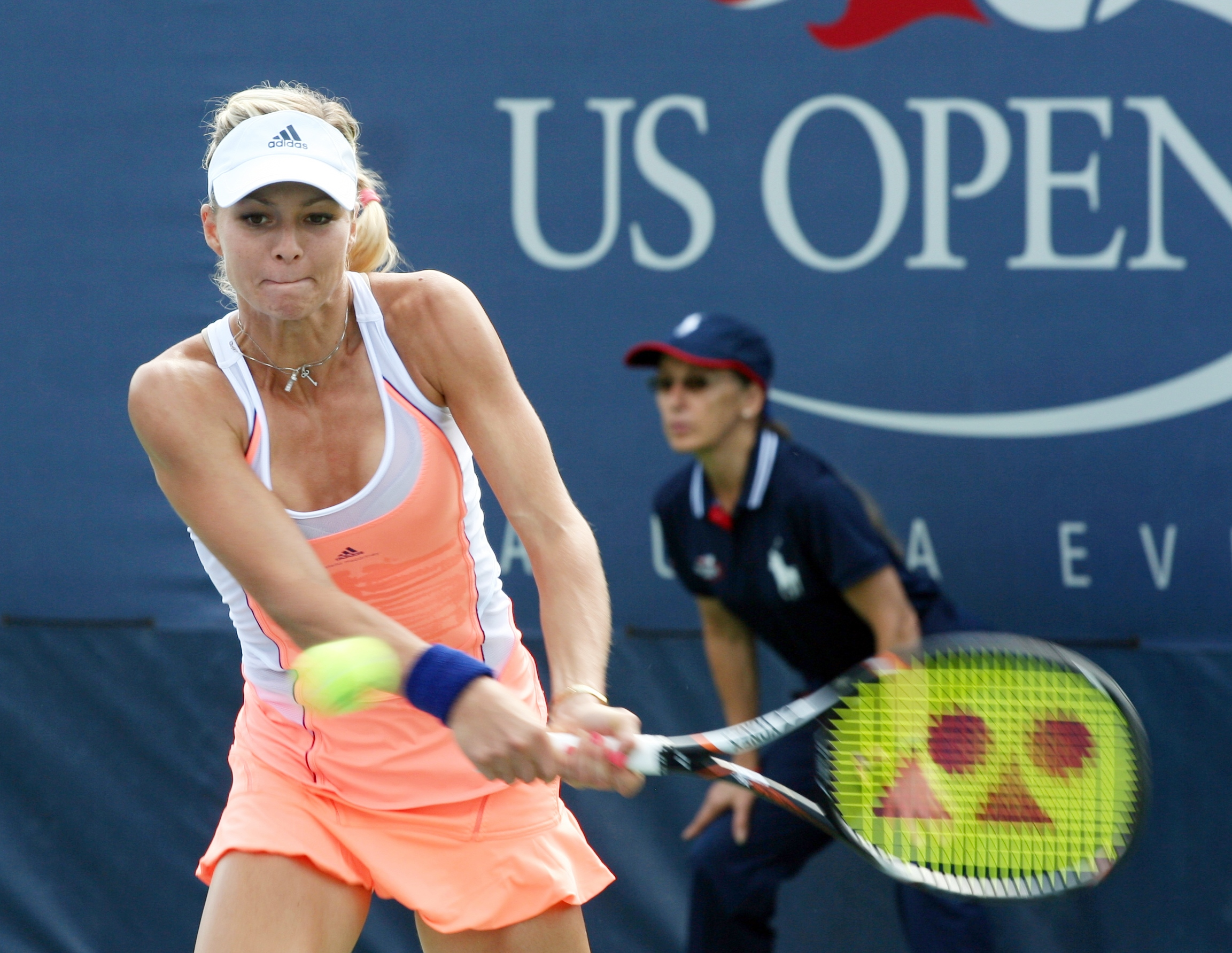
Maria Kirilenko reached the top 10 for the first time.

Maria Kirilenko

Kirilenko's first half of 2013 saw her with good results and broke through the top 10, while her second saw her struggle with a knee injury. Kirilenko last year's wildcard received entry into the event after winning the PTT Pattaya Open defeating Sabine Lisicki 5–7, 6–1, 7–6^{(7–1)}. Kirilenko was able to reach the semifinals of the BNP Paribas Open losing to compatriot Maria Sharapova 4–6, 3–6. At the slams, Kirilenko reached her first French Open quarterfinal and her third slam quarterfinals losing to Victoria Azarenka 6–7^{(7–9)}, 2–6. She also reached the fourth round of the Australian Open losing to Serena Williams 2–6, 0–6, third round of the US Open losing to Simona Halep 1–6, 0–6, and was upset in the first round of Wimbledon losing to Laura Robson 3–6, 4–6. She is making her second appearance at the event.

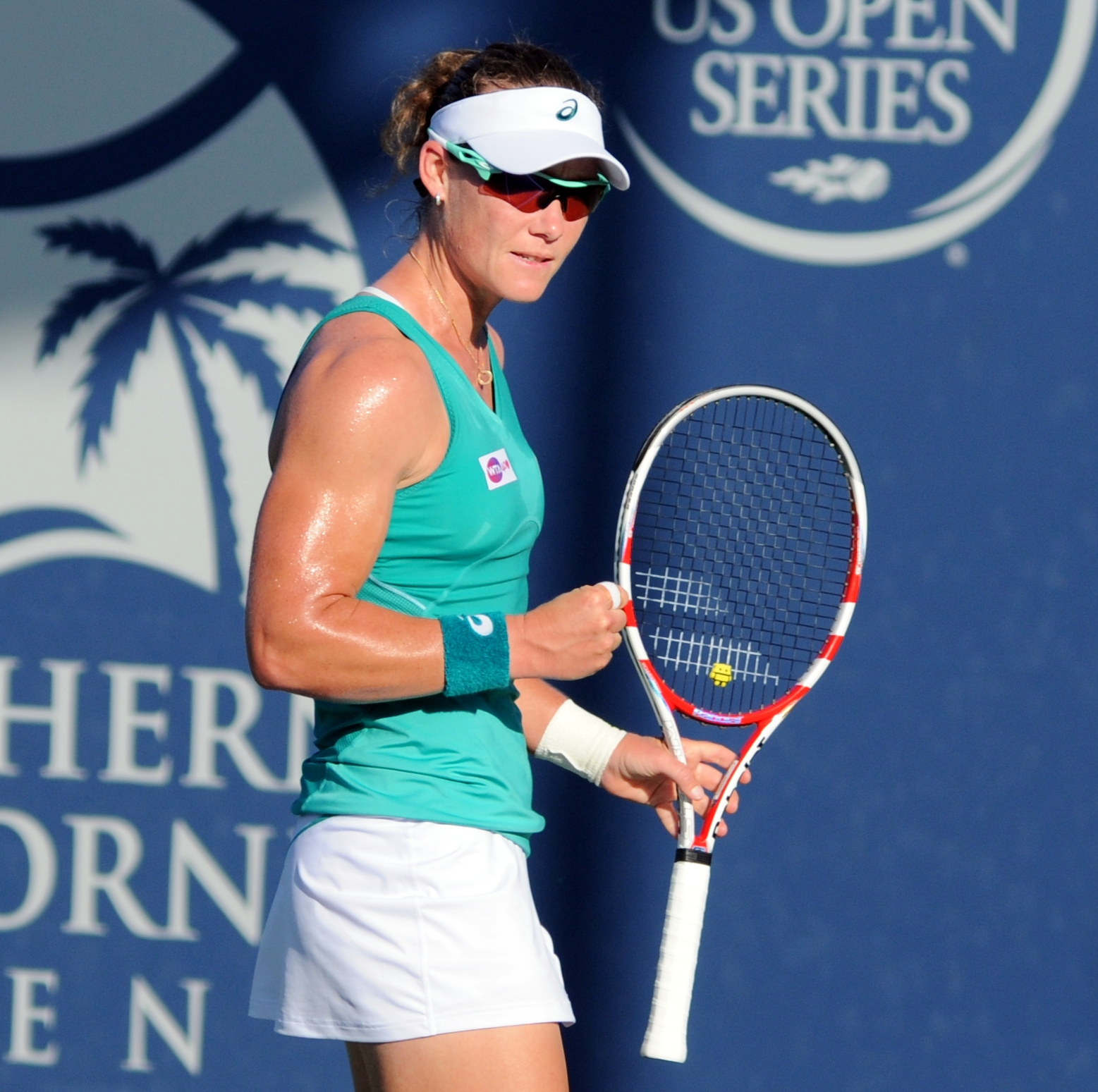
Samantha Stosur wins two titles in 2013.

Samantha Stosur

Stosur had a dip in 2013, falling out of the top 10 for the first time since 2010 and finishing outside the top 10 for the first time since 2009. At the slams, Stosur failed to get past the fourth round of a slam in a year since 2008. She lost in the third rounds of French Open, to Jelena Janković 6–3, 3–6, 4–6, and Wimbledon, to eventual runner-up Sabine Lisicki 6–4, 2–6, 1–6. She also lost in the second round to Zheng Jie 4–6, 6–1, 5–7 at the Australian Open and first round of US Open to American qualifier Victoria Duval 7–5, 4–6, 4–6. After poor results in the beginning of the year, Stosur showed good form by reaching back-to-back quarterfinals in Qatar and Dubai. However, after withdrawing from her quarterfinal match against Angelique Kerber at the BNP Paribas due to a calf-injury, Stosur showed poor form throughout the year until shocking Victoria Azarenka in the final of the Southern California Open. She won her second title of the year at HP Open defeating Eugenie Bouchard 3–6, 7–5, 6–2 to receive entry into the Tournament of Champions. She is making her 2nd appearance in the event.

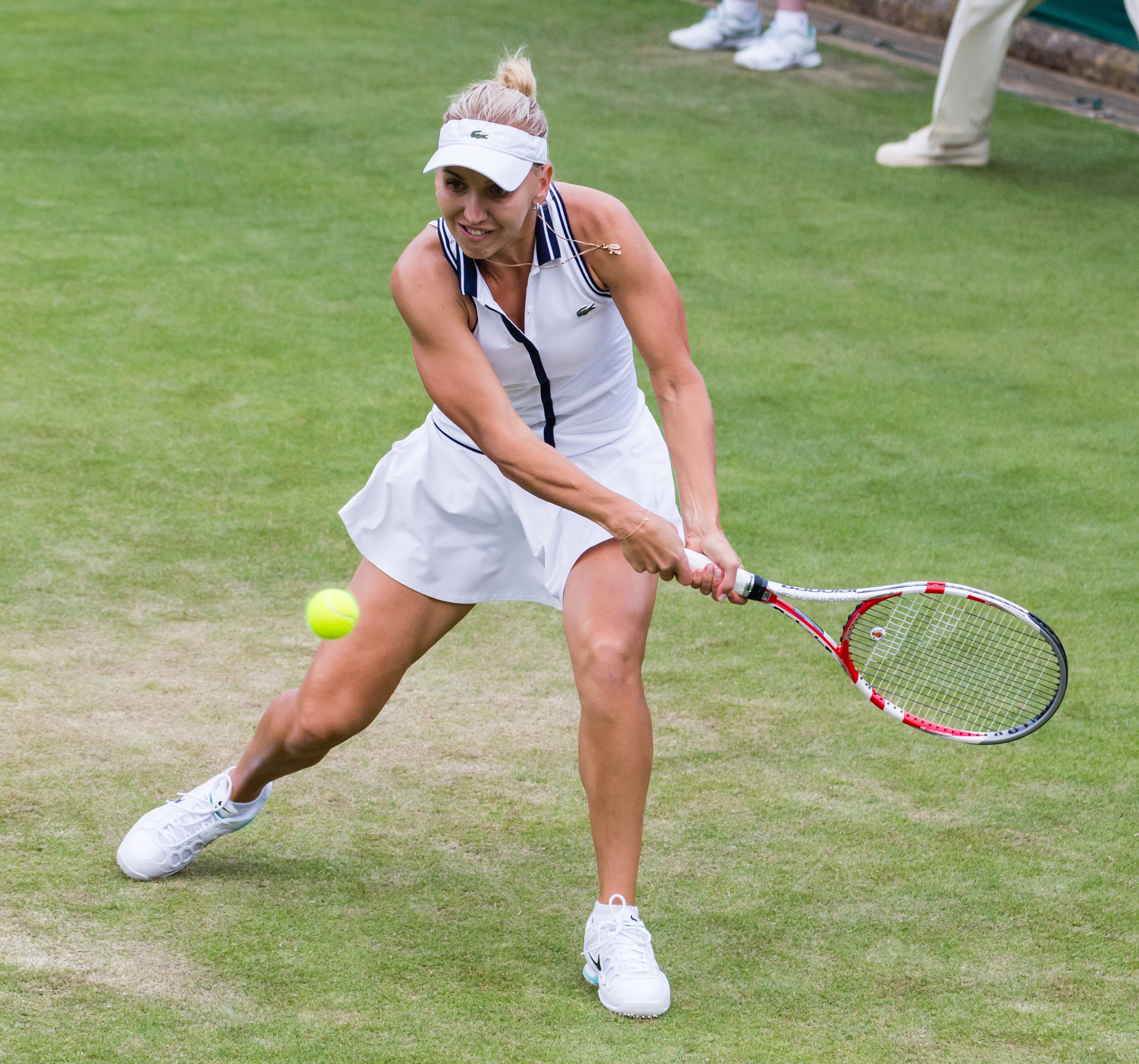
Elena Vesnina won her first career title.

Elena Vesnina

Vesnina made her breakthrough year in 2013. She won her first title after six former runners-up at the Moorilla Hobart International, defeating German Mona Barthel in the final 6–3, 6–4. This also gave Vesnina entry into the tournament of champions. She then won her second title at the Aegon International a Premier event defeating Jamie Hampton 6–2, 6–1. At the slam, the Russian reached the fourth round of the Australian Open and the first round of the French Open losing to Victoria Azarenka in both occasions 1–6, 1–6, and 1–6, 4–6, respectively. The Russian then fell in the second rounds of Wimbledon and US Open to Sabine Lisicki 3–6, 1–6 and Karin Knapp 1–6, 4–6, respectively. She also won French Open with Ekaterina Makarova. She opted to play at the Tournament of Champions rather than the Fed Cup final. She is making her debut to the event.

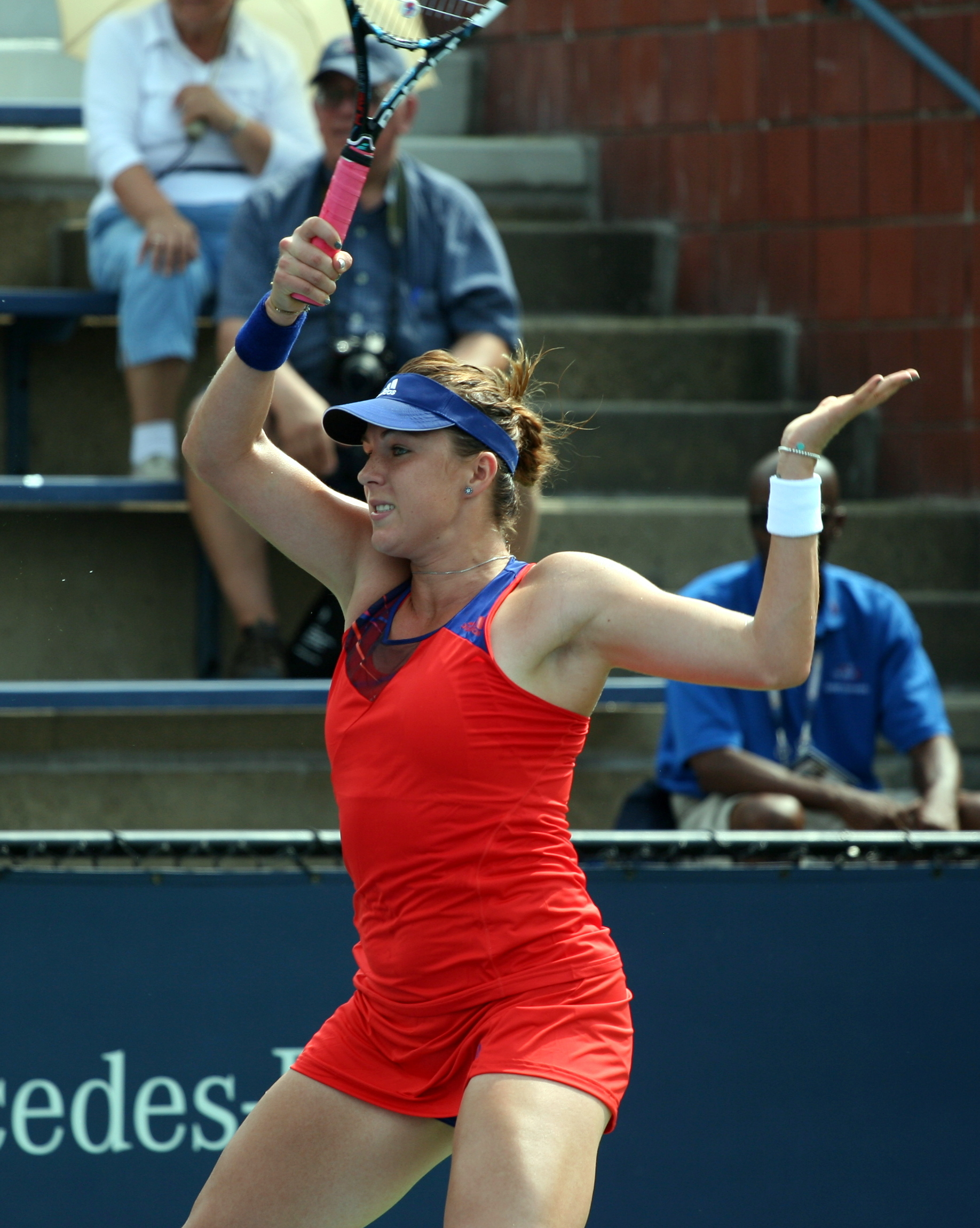
Anastasia Pavlyuchenkova won 2 titles in the year.

Anastasia Pavlyuchenkova

Pavlyuchenkova is the third Russian to play at the event. Pavlyuchenkova won two international events in clay to gain entry into the event, the first coming at the Monterrey Open defeating Angelique Kerber 4–6, 6–2, 6–4 and the second at the Portugal Open defeating Carla Suárez Navarro 7–5, 6–2. The Russian also reached two other finals but lost, the first being at the Premier event of the Brisbane International losing to Serena Williams 2–6, 1–6 and the second at the KDB Korea Open losing to Agnieszka Radwańska, 7–6^{(8–6)}, 3–6, 4–6. The Russian didn't fare well at the slams, her best performance reaching the third round of the US Open losing to Radwańska 4–6, 6–7^{(7–9)}. She then fell in the second round of the French Open to Petra Cetkovská 5–7, 6–2, 4–6, and the first rounds of the Australian Open and Wimbledon to Lesia Tsurenko 5–7, 6–3, 5–7 and Tsvetana Pironkova 0–6, 1–6.

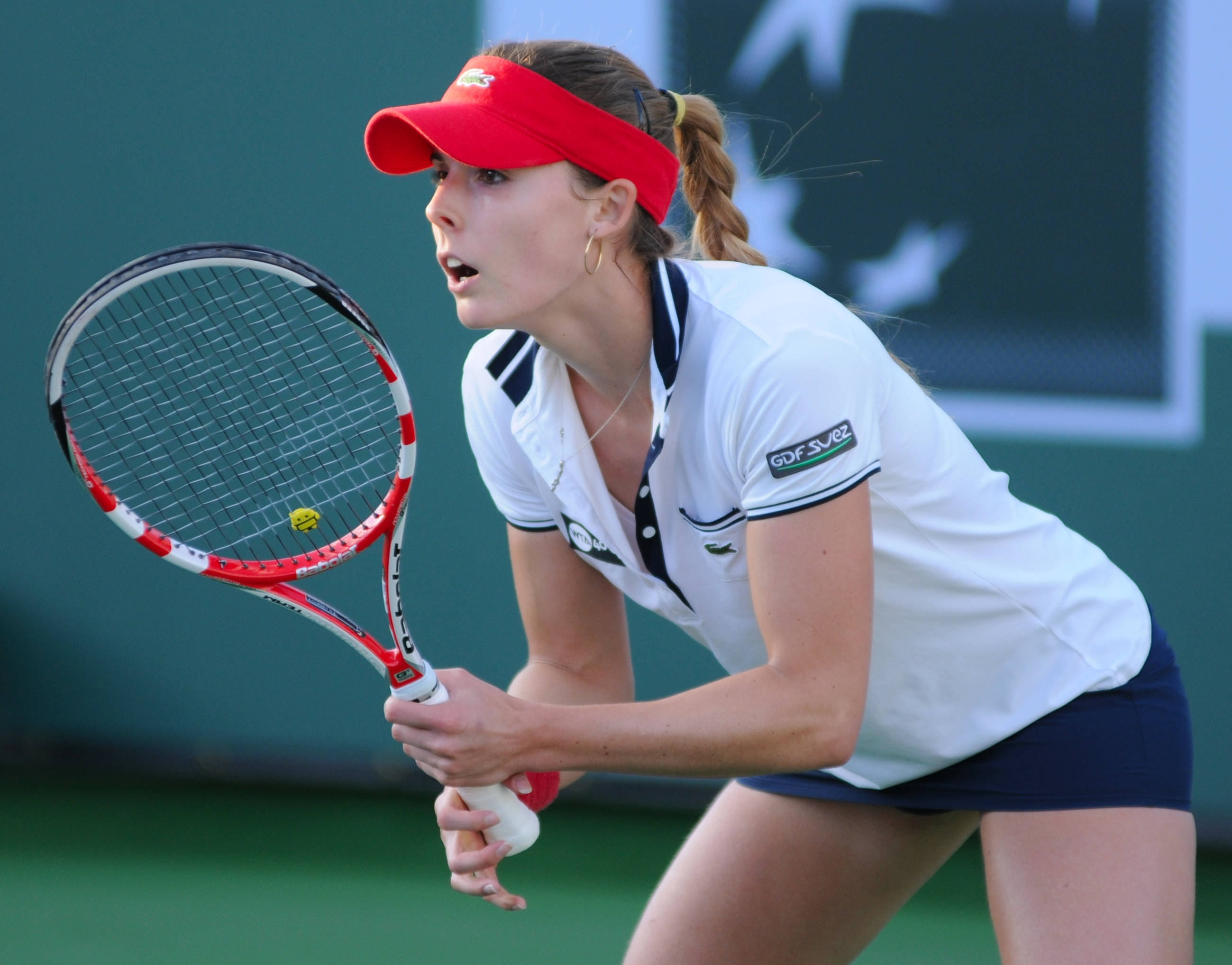
Alizé Cornet won in Strasbourg.

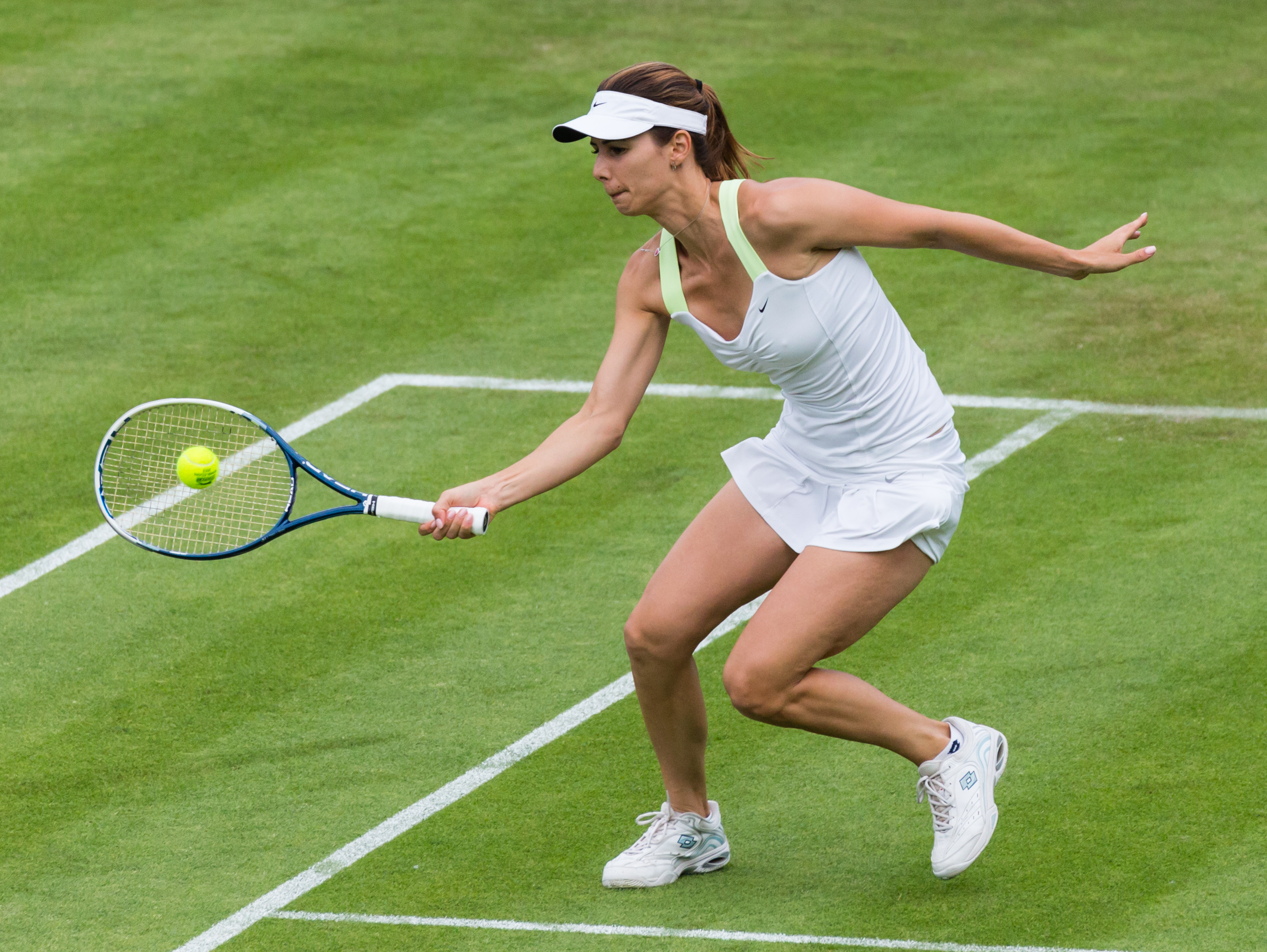
Tsvetana Pironkova was awarded a wildcard.

Alizé Cornet

Cornet had a resurgence this season - re-entering the top 30, and winning her third WTA career title. Cornet qualified for Sofia by winning her maiden tournament of the year at the Internationaux de Strasbourg, defeating Czech Lucie Hradecká 7–6^{(7–4)}, 6–0. At the slams, the Frenchwoman lost in the second round of the Australian Open to Venus Williams 3–6, 3–6. She then reached the third round of Wimbledon losing to Flavia Pennetta 6–0, 6–7^{(7–9)}, 2–6. She also fell to Victoria Azarenka in the third rounds of the French Open 6–4, 3–6, 1–6, and US Open 7–6^{(2–7)}, 3–6, 2–6. She is making her debut to the event.

Tsvetana Pironkova

Pironkova is one of the wild card recipients, being a native of Bulgaria. She reached two quarterfinals in the year at the Topshelf Open and at 2013 Moorilla Hobart International. However, she was able to reach the fourth round of Wimbledon before losing to world no. 4 Agnieszka Radwańska 6–4, 3–6, 3–6. In the other slams, Pironkova didn't fare well falling in the first rounds of the Australian Open to Romina Oprandi 6–4, 5–7, 2–6, French Open to Eugenie Bouchard 1–6, 6–7^{(7–9)}, and US Open to Alison Riske 3–6, 3–6.

== Groupings ==
In the 2013 edition of the Tournament of Champions, the competitors were divided into two groups: the Serdika and the Sredets, representing the names of two districts in Sofia. The Serdika Group consists of no. 1 seed Simona Halep, no. 3 seed Maria Kirilenko, no. 6 seed Anastasia Pavlyuchenkova, and no. 7 seed Alizé Cornet. The Sredets Groups is composed by no. 2 seed Ana Ivanovic, no. 4 seed Samantha Stosur, no. 5 seed Elena Vesnina, and no. 8 seed Tsvetana Pironkova. The two alternates are Elina Svitolina and Yvonne Meusburger.

In Serdika Group, and their respective match–ups against their group, Halep was 4–1, Kirilenko was 1–6, Pavlyuchenkova was 5–4, and Cornet was 4–3. In their individual match–ups, Halep is unbeaten against the Russians 1–0 against Kirilenko and 3–0 against Pavlyuchenkova, with Halep beating Kirilenko in their only match at the 3rd round of the 2013 US Open 6–1, 6–0, and beating Pavlyuchenkova in the semifinals of the 2013 Kremlin Cup 6–2, 6–1. However, against Cornet she lost their only match at the 2011 Monterrey Open 5–7, 1–6. Kirilenko has a negative record in her group, including being 1–2 against Pavlyuchenkova with Pavlyuchenkova winning their last match at the 2013 Kremlin Cup 6–3, 6–3 and 0–3 against Cornet, the last being at the 2013 Rogers Cup 5–7, 5–7. In the final match up Pavlyuchenkova has a perfect 3–0 record against Cornet, however their last match was at the 2011 Fed Cup with a 3 set win 3–6, 6–3, 6–2.

In Sredets Groups, and their head–to–heads in their group, Ivanovic was 5–5, Stosur was 7–4, Vesnina was 3–3, and Pironkova was 1–2. Ivanovic has a mixed head–to–head against her group, she trails Stosur 2–4, with Stosur winning their last three meetings the last being a 7–5, 6–4 win at the 2013 Kremlin Cup. She leads Vesnina 2–1, however Vesnina won their last meeting at the 2013 Aegon International 2–6, 6–4, 6–3. She also led Pironkova 2–1, including winning their last encounter 6–0, 6–4 at the 2012 US Open. Stosur also has mixed results in her other head–to–heads, she trails Vesnina 1–2, with Vesnina winning their last match at the 2013 Family Circle Cup. On the other hand, she is 2–0 against Pironkova winning their last match at 2011 China Open 6–4, 6–0. On the final head–to–head between Vesnina and Pironkova, this will be their first meeting.

== Day-by-day summary ==
=== Day 1 (29 October) ===
Matches on Armeets Arena
| Group | Winner | Loser | Score |
|---|---|---|---|
| Singles – Sredets Group | (Serbia) Ana Ivanovic [2] | (Bulgaria) Tsvetana Pironkova [8] | 6–0, 6–2 |
| Singles – Serdika Group | (France) Alizé Cornet [7] | (Russia) Maria Kirilenko [3] | 5–0, ret. |
| Singles – Serdika Group | (Romania) Simona Halep [1] | (Russia) Anastasia Pavlyuchenkova [6] | 6–3, 6–3 |

=== Day 2 (30 October) ===
Matches on Armeets Arena
| Group | Winner | Loser | Score |
|---|---|---|---|
| Singles – Sredets Group | (Australia) Samantha Stosur [4] | (Russia) Elena Vesnina [5] | 6–3, 6–3 |
| Singles – Serdika Group | (Romania) Simona Halep [1] | (France) Alizé Cornet [7] | 6–4, 6–4 |
| Singles – Serdika Group | (Russia) Anastasia Pavlyuchenkova [6] | (Ukraine) Elina Svitolina [Alt] | 6–2, 6–4 |

=== Day 3 (31 October) ===
Matches on Armeets Arena
| Group | Winner | Loser | Score |
|---|---|---|---|
| Singles – Sredets Group | (Serbia) Ana Ivanovic [2] | (Australia) Samantha Stosur [4] | 6–2, 5–7, 6–2 |
| Singles – Sredets Group | (Russia) Elena Vesnina [5] | (Bulgaria) Tsvetana Pironkova [8] | 6–2, 4–6, 6–0 |
| Singles – Serdika Group | (Romania) Simona Halep [1] | (Ukraine) Elina Svitolina [Alt] | 6–1, 6–1 |

=== Day 4 (1 November) ===
Matches on Armeets Arena
| Group | Winner | Loser | Score |
|---|---|---|---|
| Singles – Sredets Group | (Russia) Elena Vesnina [5] | (Serbia) Ana Ivanovic [2] | 6–4, 3–6, 7–6^{(7–1)} |
| Singles – Serdika Group | (Russia) Anastasia Pavlyuchenkova [6] | (France) Alizé Cornet [7] | 6–2, 6–2 |
| Singles – Sredets Group | (Australia) Samantha Stosur [4] | (Bulgaria) Tsvetana Pironkova [8] | 6–1, 6–4 |

=== Day 5 (2 November) ===
Matches on Armeets Arena
| Group | Winner | Loser | Score |
|---|---|---|---|
| Singles – Semifinals | (Romania) Simona Halep [1] | (Serbia) Ana Ivanovic [2] | 2–6, 6–1, 6–3 |
| Singles – Semifinals | (Australia) Samantha Stosur [4] | (Russia) Anastasia Pavlyuchenkova [6] | 6–1, 1–6, 6–3 |

=== Day 6 (3 November) ===
Matches on Armeets Arena
| Group | Winner | Loser | Score |
|---|---|---|---|
| Singles – Final | (Romania) Simona Halep [1] | (Australia) Samantha Stosur [4] | 2–6, 6–2, 6–2 |

== Player head-to-head ==
Below are the head-to-head records as they approached the tournament.

| | | Halep | Ivanovic | Kirilenko | Stosur | Vesnina | Pavlyuchenkova | Cornet | Pironkova | Overall | YTD |
| 1 | (Romania) Simona Halep | | 0–1 | 1–0 | 2–3 | 1–0 | 3–0 | 0–1 | 0–0 | 7–5 | 48–17 |
| 2 | (Serbia) Ana Ivanovic | 1–0 | | 4–2 | 2–4 | 2–1 | 5–0 | 1–1 | 2–1 | 17–9 | 38–21 |
| 3 | (Russia) Maria Kirilenko | 0–1 | 2–4 | | 4–4 | 4–0 | 1–2 | 0–3 | 1–0 | 12–14 | 36–18 |
| 4 | (Australia) Samantha Stosur | 3–2 | 4–2 | 4–4 | | 1–2 | 2–1 | 4–2 | 2–0 | 20–13 | 39–21 |
| 5 | (Russia) Elena Vesnina | 0–1 | 1–2 | 0–4 | 2–1 | | 0–3 | 1–3 | 0–0 | 4–14 | 29–20 |
| 6 | (Russia) Anastasia Pavlyuchenkova | 0–3 | 0–5 | 2–1 | 1–2 | 3–0 | | 3–0 | 0–2 | 8–13 | 31–21 |
| 7 | (France) Alizé Cornet | 1–0 | 1–1 | 3–0 | 2–4 | 3–1 | 0–3 | | 1–2 | 11–11 | 34–25 |
| 8 | (Bulgaria) Tsvetana Pironkova | 0–0 | 1–2 | 0–1 | 0–2 | 0–0 | 2–0 | 2–1 | | 5–6 | 11–23 |

== Champions ==
=== Singles ===
- (Romania) Simona Halep def. (Australia) Samantha Stosur, 2–6, 6–2, 6–2

== See also ==
- WTA Tournament of Champions
- 2013 WTA Tour
