= 2014 Monterrey Open =

- Date: 31 March–6 April
- Edition: 6th
- Category: WTA International
- Draw: 32S / 16D
- Prize money: $500,000
- Surface: Hard / outdoor
- Location: Monterrey, Mexico

Champions

Singles
- (Serbia) Ana Ivanovic

Doubles
- (Croatia) Darija Jurak / (United States) Megan Moulton-Levy
- Monterrey Open

The 2014 Monterrey Open was a women's tennis tournament played on outdoor hard courts. It was the sixth edition of the Monterrey Open and an WTA International tier tournament on the 2014 WTA Tour. It took place at the Club Sonoma in Monterrey, Mexico, from 31 March to 6 April 2014. Second-seeded Ana Ivanovic won the singles title.

== Finals ==
=== Singles ===
- (Serbia) Ana Ivanovic defeated (Serbia) Jovana Jakšić 6–2, 6–1

=== Doubles ===
- (Croatia) Darija Jurak / (United States) Megan Moulton-Levy defeated (Hungary) Tímea Babos / (Belarus) Olga Govortsova 7–6^{(7–5)}, 3–6, [11–9]

== Points and prize money ==
=== Point distribution ===
| Event | W | F | SF | QF | Round of 16 | Round of 32 | Q | Q3 | Q2 | Q1 |
| Singles | 280 | 180 | 110 | 60 | 30 | 1 | 18 | 14 | 10 | 1 |
| Doubles | 280 | 180 | 110 | 60 | 1 | —N/a | —N/a | —N/a | —N/a | —N/a |

=== Prize money ===
| Event | W | F | SF | QF | Round of 16 | Round of 32 | Q3 | Q2 | Q1 |
| Singles | $111,389 | $55,435 | $29,270 | $8,502 | $4,770 | $2,774 | $1,448 | $1,052 | $764 |
| Doubles | $17,724 | $9,222 | $4,950 | $2,623 | $1,383 | —N/a | —N/a | —N/a | —N/a |

== Singles main draw entrants ==
=== Seeds ===
| Country | Player | Rank* | Seed |
|---|---|---|---|
| ITA | Flavia Pennetta | 12 | 1 |
| SRB | Ana Ivanovic | 13 | 2 |
| DEN | Caroline Wozniacki | 18 | 3 |
| BEL | Kirsten Flipkens | 23 | 4 |
| ESP | Garbiñe Muguruza | 34 | 5 |
| SVK | Magdaléna Rybáriková | 36 | 6 |
| ITA | Karin Knapp | 50 | 7 |
| PUR | Monica Puig | 58 | 8 |

- Rankings as of 17 March 2014

=== Other entrants ===
The following players received wildcards into the main draw:

- (Belgium) Kirsten Flipkens
- (Mexico) Ximena Hermoso
- (Mexico) Marcela Zacarías

The following players received entry via qualifying:

- (United States) Julia Boserup
- (Slovenia) Dalila Jakupović
- (Thailand) Luksika Kumkhum
- (Canada) Aleksandra Wozniak

=== Withdrawals ===
Before the tournament

- (Belarus) Victoria Azarenka (finger injury) → replaced by (United Kingdom) Johanna Konta
- (Ukraine) Nadiia Kichenok → replaced by (Serbia) Jovana Jakšić
- (Luxembourg) Mandy Minella (edema in right arm) → replaced by (Slovenia) Tadeja Majerič
- (United Kingdom) Laura Robson → replaced by (Russia) Olga Puchkova

=== Retirements ===
- (Japan) Ayumi Morita (dizziness)

== Doubles main draw entrants ==
=== Seeds ===
| Country | Player | Country | Player | Rank^{1} | Seed |
|---|---|---|---|---|---|
| HUN | Tímea Babos | BLR | Olga Govortsova | 93 | 1 |
| CAN | Gabriela Dabrowski | GEO | Oksana Kalashnikova | 107 | 2 |
| CRO | Darija Jurak | USA | Megan Moulton-Levy | 110 | 3 |
| JPN | Kimiko Date-Krumm | CZE | Karolína Plíšková | 140 | 4 |

- Rankings as of 17 March 2014

=== Other entrants ===
The following pairs received wildcards into the doubles main draw:

- (Mexico) Alejandra Cisneros / (Mexico) Camila Fuentes
- (Mexico) Victoria Rodríguez / (Mexico) Marcela Zacarías

=== Withdrawals ===
During the tournament

- (Japan) Kimiko Date-Krumm (right leg injury)
