= 2013 Monterrey Open – Doubles =

Doubles
- 2013 Monterrey Open

Final
- Champions: (Hungary) Tímea Babos (Japan) Kimiko Date-Krumm
- Runners-up: (Czech Republic) Eva Birnerová (Thailand) Tamarine Tanasugarn
- Score: 6–1, 6–4

Details
- Draw: 16
- Seeds: 4

Events
Singles	Doubles
← 2012 ·	Monterrey Open	· 2014 →

Sara Errani and Roberta Vinci were the defending champions, but chose not to participate this year.
Tímea Babos and Kimiko Date-Krumm won the title, defeating Eva Birnerová and Tamarine Tanasugarn in the final 6–1, 6–4.

== Seeds ==
1. (Hungary) Tímea Babos / (Japan) Kimiko Date-Krumm (champions)
2. (Russia) Nina Bratchikova / (Russia) Vera Dushevina (first round)
3. (Czech Republic) Eva Birnerová / (Thailand) Tamarine Tanasugarn (final)
4. (Israel) Julia Glushko / (France) Laura Thorpe (quarterfinals)

== Draw ==
=== Key ===
- Q = Qualifier
- WC = Wild card
- LL = Lucky loser
- Alt = Alternate
- SE = Special exempt
- PR = Protected ranking
- ITF = ITF entry
- JE = Junior exempt
- w/o = Walkover
- r = Retired
- d = Defaulted
- SR = Special ranking

=== Draw ===
First round
1	(Hungary) T Babos (Japan) K Date-Krumm	6	6
(Brazil) MF Alves (Venezuela) A Pérez	1	1
(Canada) G Dabrowski (Russia) A Kudryavtseva	6	6
(Austria) N Rottmann (Slovakia) L Wienerová	0	3
4	(Israel) J Glushko (France) L Thorpe	6	6
WC	(Mexico) X Hermoso (Mexico) AS Sánchez	3	1
(Ukraine) O Savchuk (Russia) V Savinykh	4	3
(United States) A Muhammad (United States) A Will	6	6
(Thailand) L Kumkhum (Thailand) N Lertcheewakarn	3	3
WC	(Russia) D Gavrilova (Mexico) M Zacarías	6	6
(Argentina) M Auroux (Argentina) M Irigoyen	2	0
3	(Czech Republic) E Birnerová (Thailand) T Tanasugarn	6	6
(Greece) E Daniilidou (United States) C Vandeweghe	4	6	[10]
(United States) J Cohen (Croatia) T Mrdeža	6	4	[6]
(United States) N Melichar (United States) M Sanchez	7	7^{7}
2	(Russia) N Bratchikova (Russia) V Dushevina	5	6^{4}

Quarterfinals
1	(Hungary) T Babos (Japan) K Date-Krumm	4	6	[10]
(Canada) G Dabrowski (Russia) A Kudryavtseva	6	3	[6]
4	(Israel) J Glushko (France) L Thorpe	2	4
(United States) A Muhammad (United States) A Will	6	6
WC	(Russia) D Gavrilova (Mexico) M Zacarías	4	3
3	(Czech Republic) E Birnerová (Thailand) T Tanasugarn	6	6
(Greece) E Daniilidou (United States) C Vandeweghe	4	6	[10]
(United States) N Melichar (United States) M Sanchez	6	4	[8]

Semifinals
1	(Hungary) T Babos (Japan) K Date-Krumm	7	6
(United States) A Muhammad (United States) A Will	5	4
3	(Czech Republic) E Birnerová (Thailand) T Tanasugarn	w/o
(Greece) E Daniilidou (United States) C Vandeweghe

Final
1	(Hungary) T Babos (Japan) K Date-Krumm	6	6
3	(Czech Republic) E Birnerová (Thailand) T Tanasugarn	1	4
