= 2013 Garanti Koza WTA Tournament of Champions – Singles =

Singles
- 2013 Garanti Koza WTA Tournament of Champions

Final
- Champion: (Romania) Simona Halep
- Runner-up: (Australia) Samantha Stosur
- Score: 2–6, 6–2, 6–2

Details
- Draw: 8

Events
Singles
← 2012 ·	WTA Tournament of Champions	· 2014 →

Nadia Petrova was the defending champion, but did not qualify this year.
Simona Halep won the title, defeating Samantha Stosur in the final, 2–6, 6–2, 6–2.

== Players ==
1. (Romania) Simona Halep (champion)
2. (Serbia) Ana Ivanovic (semifinals)
3. (Russia) Maria Kirilenko (round robin, retired)
4. (Australia) Samantha Stosur (final)
5. (Russia) Elena Vesnina (round robin)
6. (Russia) Anastasia Pavlyuchenkova (semifinals)
7. (France) Alizé Cornet (round robin)
8. (Bulgaria) Tsvetana Pironkova (round robin)

== Alternates ==
1. (Ukraine) Elina Svitolina (round robin, replaced Kirilenko)
2. (Austria) Yvonne Meusburger (Not used)

== Draw ==
Key

- Q = Qualifier
- WC = Wild card
- LL = Lucky loser
- Alt = Alternate
- ITF = ITF entry
- PR = Protected ranking
- SR = Special ranking
- SE = Special exempt
- JE = Junior exempt
- JR = Junior Accelerator Programme entrant
- CO = College Accelerator Programme entrant
- NG = Next Gen Accelerator Program entrant
- w/o = Walkover
- r = Retired
- d = Defaulted

=== Finals ===
Semifinals
1	(Romania) Simona Halep	2	6	6
2/WC	(Serbia) Ana Ivanovic	6	1	3
4	(Australia) Samantha Stosur	6	1	6
6	(Russia) Anastasia Pavlyuchenkova	1	6	3

Final
1	(Romania) Simona Halep	2	6	6
4	(Australia) Samantha Stosur	6	2	2

=== Serdika group ===
		(Romania) Halep	(Russia) Kirilenko (Ukraine) Svitolina	(Russia) Pavlyuchenkova	(France) Cornet	RR W–L	Set W–L	Game W–L	Standings
1	(Romania) Simona Halep		6–1, 6–1 (w/ Svitolina)	6–3, 6–3	6–4, 6–4	3–0	6–0 (100%)	36–16 (69%)	1
3 Alt	(Russia) Maria Kirilenko (Ukraine) Elina Svitolina	(w/ Svitolina); 1–6, 1–6		(w/ Svitolina); 2–6, 4–6	0–5^{r} (w/ Kirilenko)	0–1; 0–2	0–0; 0–4 (0%)	0–5 (0%); 8–24 (25%)	X 4
6	(Russia) Anastasia Pavlyuchenkova	3–6, 3–6	6–2, 6–4 (w/ Svitolina)		6–2, 6–2	2–1	4–2 (67%)	30–22 (58%)	2
7	(France) Alizé Cornet	4–6, 4–6	5–0^{r}(w/ Kirilenko)	2–6, 2–6		1–2	0–4 (0%)	17–24 (41%)	3

Standings are determined by: 1. number of wins; 2. number of matches; 3. in two-players-ties, head-to-head records; 4. in three-players-ties, percentage of sets won, or of games won; 5. steering-committee decision.

=== Sredets group ===
		(Serbia) Ivanovic	(Australia) Stosur	(Russia) Vesnina	(Bulgaria) Pironkova	RR W–L	Set W–L	Game W–L	Standings
2/WC	(Serbia) Ana Ivanovic		6–2, 5–7, 6–2	4–6, 6–3, 6–7^{(1–7)}	6–0, 6–2	2–1	5–3 (63%)	45–29 (61%)	2
4	(Australia) Samantha Stosur	2–6, 7–5, 2–6		6–3, 6–3	6–1, 6–4	2–1	5–2 (71%)	35–28 (56%)	1
5	(Russia) Elena Vesnina	6–4, 3–6, 7–6^{(7–1)}	3–6, 3–6		6–2, 4–6, 6–0	2–1	4–4 (50%)	38–36 (51%)	3
8/WC	(Bulgaria) Tsvetana Pironkova	0–6, 2–6	1–6, 4–6	2–6, 6–4, 0–6		0–3	1–6 (14%)	15–40 (27%)	4

Standings are determined by: 1. number of wins; 2. number of matches; 3. in two-players-ties, head-to-head records; 4. in three-players-ties, percentage of sets won, or of games won; 5. steering-committee decision.
