= Camila Fuentes =

Mexican tennis player (born 1995)

- Country (sports): Mexico
- Born: 29 September 1995 (age 29); El Paso, United States
- Plays: Right (two-handed backhand)
- Prize money: $16,856

Singles
- Career record: 44–55
- Career titles: 0
- Highest ranking: No. 617 (18 May 2015)

Doubles
- Career record: 50–42
- Career titles: 3 ITF
- Highest ranking: No. 433 (24 August 2015)

Camila Fuentes (born 29 September 1995) is an American-born Mexican former tennis player.

Fuentes has career-high WTA rankings of 617 in singles, reached on 18 May 2015, and of 433 in doubles, achieved on 24 August 2015.

She made her WTA Tour debut at the 2014 Monterrey Open, in the doubles event, partnering Alejandra Cisneros. The pairing lost in the first round to second seeds Gabriela Dabrowski and Oksana Kalashnikova, 5–7, 6–1, [7–10].

== ITF finals ==
=== Doubles: 5 (3 titles, 2 runner-ups) ===
Legend $50,000 tournaments $25,000 tournaments $15,000 tournaments $10,000 tournaments	Finals by surface Hard (3–2) Clay (0–0) Grass (0–0) Carpet (0–0)

Outcome	No.	Date	Tournament	Surface	Partner	Opponents	Score
Win	1.	28 October 2012	ITF Victora, Mexico	Hard	(United States) Blair Shankle	(Mexico) Alejandra Cisneros (Mexico) Victoria Rodríguez	7–6^{(4)}, 6–1
Win	2.	25 August 2013	ITF San Luis Potosí, Mexico	Hard	(Mexico) Carolina Betancourt	(Mexico) Ana Sofía Sánchez (Mexico) Marcela Zacarías	6–2, 6–3
Loss	1.	2 November 2013	ITF Quintana Roo, Mexico	Hard	(Mexico) Carolina Betancourt	(Canada) Khristina Blajkevitch (France) Brandy Mina	6–7^{(2)}, 2–6
Loss	2.	26 April 2014	ITF Antalya, Turkey	Hard	(Hungary) Szabina Szlavikovics	(Mexico) Victoria Rodríguez (Mexico) Marcela Zacarías	1–6, 1–6
Win	3.	13 June 2014	ITF Coatzacoalcos, Mexico	Hard	(Mexico) Marcela Zacarías	(Colombia) María Paulina Pérez (Colombia) Paula Andrea Pérez	6–2, 6–2
