= Allie Will =

American tennis player

- Country (sports): United States
- Born: April 20, 1991 (age 33); Boca Raton, Florida, U.S.
- Prize money: $76,476

Singles
- Career record: 119–104
- Career titles: 0
- Highest ranking: No. 280 (August 5, 2013)

Doubles
- Career record: 108–67
- Career titles: 11 ITF
- Highest ranking: No. 98 (February 3, 2014)

Allie Will (born April 20, 1991) is an American former tennis player.

Will was born in Boca Raton, Florida. She won eleven doubles titles on the ITF Women's Circuit in her career. On July 22, 2013, she reached her best singles ranking of world No. 293. On February 3, 2014, she peaked at No. 98 in the doubles rankings.

In April 2013, Will made her WTA Tour debut at the 2013 Monterrey Open, alongside Asia Muhammad in doubles, reaching the semifinals.

== ITF finals ==
=== Singles (0–3) ===
Legend $25,000 tournaments $10,000 tournaments	Finals by surface Hard (0–3)

Result	No.	Date	Tournament	Surface	Opponent	Score
Loss	1.	July 12, 2010	Atlanta, United States	Hard	(United States) Irina Falconi	1–6, 4–6
Loss	2.	September 10, 2012	Redding, United States	Hard	(United States) Chelsey Gullickson	3–6, 6–4, 2–6
Loss	3.	June 23, 2014	Quintana Roo, Mexico	Hard	(Mexico) Ana Sofía Sánchez	6–3, 0–6, 0–6

=== Doubles (11–6) ===
Legend $100,000 tournaments $75,000 tournaments $50,000 tournaments $25,000 tournaments $10,000 tournaments	Finals by surface Hard (6–2) Clay (5–4)

Result	No.	Date	Tournament	Surface	Partner	Opponents	Score
Win	1.	October 15, 2007	Serra Negra, Brazil	Clay	(United States) Christina McHale	(Argentina) Mailen Auroux (Argentina) Tatiana Búa	7–5, 6–3
Loss	1.	April 7, 2008	Los Mochis, Mexico	Clay	(Croatia) Indire Akiki	(Argentina) Vanesa Furlanetto (Chile) Andrea Koch Benvenuto	0–6, 5–7
Win	2.	May 25, 2009	Sumter, United States	Hard	(United States) Caitlyn Williams	(United States) Mami Inoue (United States) Kyle McPhillips	6–4, 6–4
Win	3.	June 22, 2009	Waterloo, Canada	Clay	(United States) Alexandra Mueller	(Canada) Heidi El Tabakh (Ukraine) Tetiana Luzhanska	6–2, 6–1
Win	4.	January 14, 2013	Port St. Lucie, United States	Clay	(Russia) Angelina Gabueva	(Argentina) Florencia Molinero (Venezuela) Adriana Pérez	4–6, 6–2, [10–7]
Win	5.	February 11, 2013	Rancho Santa Fe Open, United States	Hard	(United States) Asia Muhammad	(United States) Anamika Bhargava (United States) Macall Harkins	6–1, 6–4
Loss	2.	April 29, 2013	Indian Harbour Beach, United States	Clay	(United States) Asia Muhammad	(United States) Jan Abaza (United States) Louisa Chirico	4–6, 4–6
Win	6.	May 6, 2013	Raleigh, United States	Clay	(United States) Asia Muhammad	(Australia) Jessica Moore (Australia) Sally Peers	6–3, 6–3
Loss	3.	June 3, 2013	Open de Marseille, France	Clay	(United States) Asia Muhammad	(Austria) Sandra Klemenschits (Slovenia) Andreja Klepač	6–1, 4–6, [5–10]
Win	7.	July 8, 2013	Yakima, United States	Hard	(United States) Jan Abaza	(United Kingdom) Naomi Broady (United States) Irina Falconi	7–5, 3–6, [10–3]
Win	8.	November 4, 2013	Captiva Island, United States	Hard	(Canada) Gabriela Dabrowski	(United States) Julia Boserup (United States) Alexandra Mueller	6–1, 6–2
Win	9.	January 6, 2014	Vero Beach, United States	Clay	(Russia) Irina Khromacheva	(United States) Jacqueline Cako (United States) Sanaz Marand	7–5, 6–3
Loss	4.	January 20, 2014	Daytona Beach, United States	Clay	(United States) Asia Muhammad	(United States) Nicole Melichar (Serbia) Teodora Mirčić	7–6^{(5)}, 6–7^{(1)}, [1–10]
Win	10.	June 16, 2014	Quintana Roo, Mexico	Hard	(United States) Anamika Bhargava	(Mexico) Victoria Rodríguez (Mexico) Marcela Zacarías	6–2, 6–2
Win	11.	June 23, 2014	Quintana Roo, Mexico	Hard	(United States) Anamika Bhargava	(Mexico) Victoria Rodríguez (Mexico) Marcela Zacarías	6–0, 6–4
Loss	5.	July 28, 2014	Vancouver Open, Canada	Hard	(United States) Jamie Loeb	(United States) Asia Muhammad (United States) Maria Sanchez	3–6, 6–1, [8–10]
Loss	6.	September 15, 2014	Albuquerque, United States	Hard	(United States) Nicole Melichar	(United States) Jan Abaza (United States) Melanie Oudin	2–6, 3–6
