= Alejandra Cisneros =

Mexican tennis player (born 1995)

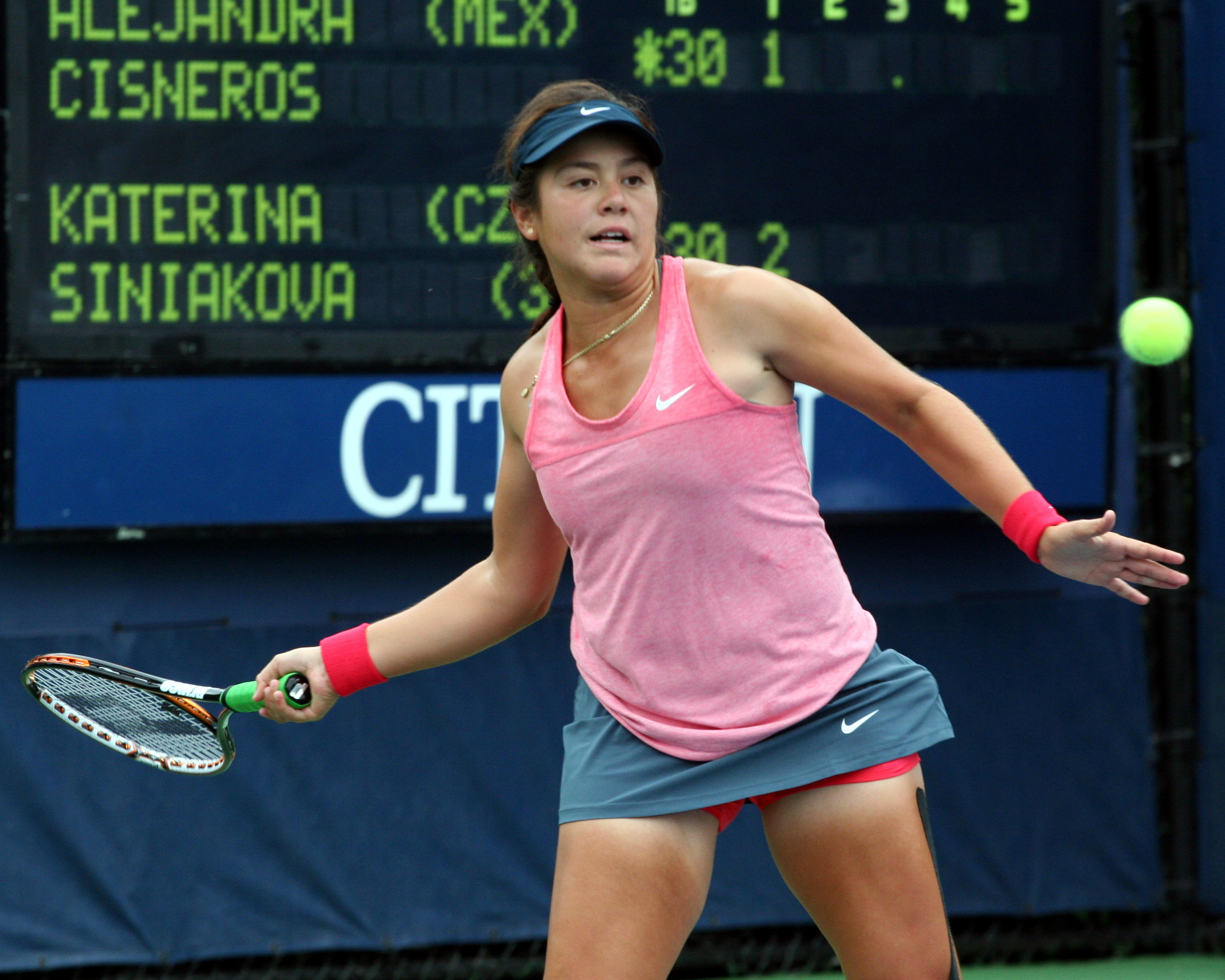
- Country (sports): Mexico
- Born: 18 April 1995 (age 29); Tampico, Mexico
- College: North Carolina State University
- Prize money: $

Singles
- Career record: 25–15
- Career titles: 0
- Highest ranking: 753 (20 October 2014)

Doubles
- Career record: 11–12
- Career titles: 0
- Highest ranking: 891 (29 April 2013)

Alejandra Cisenros (born 18 April 1995) is a Mexican former professional tennis player.

She made her WTA Tour debut at the 2014 Monterrey Open, in both singles and doubles. On the ITF Junior Circuit, Cisneros achieved a career-high ranking of world No. 18, after winning a prestigious tournament, in December 2013, in her last month of eligibility. She reached one final on the ITF Women's Circuit and had trained in Florida since 2014.

In 2015, Cisneros began studying at Armstrong State University in Savannah, Georgia, where she competed for the Armstrong Pirates and was studying economics.

In 2016, Cisneros transferred to North Carolina State University to play Division 1 collegiate tennis. Where she competed and now coaches for the Wolfpack and is studying accounting.

== ITF Circuit finals ==
=== Doubles: 1 (0–1) ===
Legend $100,000 tournaments $75,000 tournaments $50,000 tournaments $25,000 tournaments $10,000 tournaments	Finals by surface Hard (0–1) Clay (0–0) Grass (0–0) Carpet (0–0)

Result	Date	Tournament	Surface	Partner	Opponents	Score
Loss	28 October 2012	ITF Victoria, Mexico	Hard	(Mexico) Victoria Rodríguez	(Mexico) Camila Fuentes (United States) Blair Shankle	6–7^{(4)}, 1–6
