= 2013 Monterrey Open =

- Date: 1–7 April
- Edition: 5th
- Category: WTA International
- Draw: 32S / 16D
- Prize money: $235,000
- Surface: Hard
- Location: Monterrey, Mexico

Champions

Singles
- (Russia) Anastasia Pavlyuchenkova

Doubles
- (Hungary) Tímea Babos / (Japan) Kimiko Date-Krumm
- Monterrey Open

The 2013 Monterrey Open was a women's tennis tournament played on outdoor hard courts. It was the fifth edition of the Monterrey Open and an International tournament on the 2013 WTA Tour. It took place at the Sierra Madre Tennis Club in Monterrey, Mexico, from 1 April through 7 April. Fifth-seeded Anastasia Pavlyuchenkova won the singles title.

== Finals ==
=== Singles ===
- (Russia) Anastasia Pavlyuchenkova defeated (Germany) Angelique Kerber, 4–6, 6–2, 6–4

=== Doubles ===
- (Hungary) Tímea Babos / (Japan) Kimiko Date-Krumm defeated (Czech Republic) Eva Birnerová / (Thailand) Tamarine Tanasugarn, 6–1, 6–4

== Singles main-draw entrants ==
=== Seeds ===
Country	Player	Rank*	Seed
GER	Angelique Kerber	6	1
FRA	Marion Bartoli	11	2
RUS	Maria Kirilenko	13	3
SRB	Ana Ivanovic	17	4
RUS	Anastasia Pavlyuchenkova	25	5
BEL	Yanina Wickmayer	31	6
POL	Urszula Radwańska	33	7
JPN	Ayumi Morita	50	8

- Rankings as of March 18, 2013.

=== Other entrants ===
The following players received wildcards into the main draw:

- (Mexico) Ximena Hermoso
- (Serbia) Ana Ivanovic
- (Mexico) Ana Sofía Sánchez

The following players received entry via qualifying:

- (Serbia) Jovana Jakšić
- (United States) Samantha Crawford
- (Russia) Alla Kudryavtseva
- (Croatia) Tereza Mrdeža

=== Withdrawals ===
Before the tournament

- (Belarus) Victoria Azarenka (right ankle injury)
- (Belgium) Kirsten Flipkens
- (Serbia) Bojana Jovanovski
- (Latvia) Anastasija Sevastova
- (Canada) Aleksandra Wozniak (shoulder injury)
- (Russia) Vera Zvonareva (shoulder injury)

=== Retirements ===
During the tournament

- (Japan) Kimiko Date-Krumm (low back injury)
- (Russia) Olga Puchkova (respiratory illness)

== Doubles main-draw entrants ==
=== Seeds ===
Country	Player	Country	Player	Rank^{1}	Seed
HUN	Tímea Babos	JPN	Kimiko Date-Krumm	118	1
RUS	Nina Bratchikova	RUS	Vera Dushevina	118	2
CZE	Eva Birnerová	THA	Tamarine Tanasugarn	149	3
ISR	Julia Glushko	FRA	Laura Thorpe	229	4

- Rankings are as of March 18, 2013.

=== Other entrants ===
The following pairs received wildcards into the doubles main draw:

- (Russia) Daria Gavrilova / (Mexico) Marcela Zacarías
- (Mexico) Ximena Hermoso / (Mexico) Ana Sofía Sánchez

=== Withdrawals ===
During the tournament

- (United States) CoCo Vandeweghe (gastrointestinal illness)
