= 2017 Hardee's Pro Classic =

- Date: 17–23 April
- Edition: 17th
- Category: ITF Women's Circuit
- Prize money: $60,000
- Surface: Clay
- Location: Dothan, United States

Champions

Singles
- (United States) Kristie Ahn

Doubles
- (United States) Emina Bektas / (United States) Sanaz Marand
| ← 2016 · | Hardee's Pro Classic | · 2018 → |

The 2017 Hardee's Pro Classic was a professional tennis tournament played on outdoor clay courts. It was the seventeenth edition of the tournament and part of the 2017 ITF Women's Circuit, offering a total of $60,000 in prize money. It took place in Dothan, United States, from 17–23 April 2017.

== Singles main draw entrants ==
=== Seeds ===
| Country | Player | Rank^{1} | Seed |
|---|---|---|---|
| USA | Madison Brengle | 97 | 1 |
| USA | Taylor Townsend | 102 | 2 |
| GER | Tatjana Maria | 104 | 3 |
| TUN | Ons Jabeur | 119 | 4 |
| BUL | Elitsa Kostova | 146 | 5 |
| USA | Jamie Loeb | 158 | 6 |
| AUS | Lizette Cabrera | 174 | 7 |
| USA | Kristie Ahn | 179 | 8 |

- ^{1} Rankings as of 10 April 2017

=== Other entrants ===
The following players received wildcards into the singles main draw:

- (United States) Usue Maitane Arconada
- (United States) Sophie Chang
- (United States) Elizabeth Halbauer
- (United States) Caitlin Whoriskey

The following players received entry into the singles main draw by a protected ranking:

- (Ukraine) Anhelina Kalinina
- (United Kingdom) Samantha Murray

The following players received entry into the singles main draw by a junior exempt:

- (United States) Amanda Anisimova

The following players received entry from the qualifying draw:

- (Romania) Jaqueline Cristian
- (United States) Ashley Kratzer
- (Croatia) Tena Lukas
- (United States) Sanaz Marand

The following player received entry into the singles main draw by a lucky loser:

- (United States) Nicole Coopersmith

== Champions ==
=== Singles ===
- (United States) Kristie Ahn def. (United States) Amanda Anisimova, 1–6, 6–2, 6–2

=== Doubles ===
- (United States) Emina Bektas / (United States) Sanaz Marand def. (United States) Kristie Ahn / (Australia) Lizette Cabrera, 6–3, 1–6, [10–2]
