= 2018 Hardee's Pro Classic =

- Date: 16–22 April
- Edition: 18th
- Category: ITF Women's Circuit
- Prize money: $80,000
- Surface: Clay
- Location: Dothan, United States

Champions

Singles
- (United States) Taylor Townsend

Doubles
- (Chile) Alexa Guarachi / (New Zealand) Erin Routliffe
← 2017 ·	Hardee's Pro Classic	· 2019 →

The 2018 Hardee's Pro Classic was a professional tennis tournament played on outdoor clay courts. It was the eighteenth edition of the tournament and was part of the 2018 ITF Women's Circuit. It took place in Dothan, United States, on 16–22 April 2018.

== Singles main draw entrants ==
=== Seeds ===
Country	Player	Rank^{1}	Seed
USA	Jennifer Brady	85	1
USA	Sofia Kenin	86	2
USA	Kristie Ahn	109	3
USA	Taylor Townsend	113	4
COL	Mariana Duque Mariño	123	5
RUS	Sofya Zhuk	128	6
USA	Jamie Loeb	160	7
AUS	Lizette Cabrera	162	8

- ^{1} Rankings as of 9 April 2018.

=== Other entrants ===
The following players received a wildcard into the singles main draw:

- (United States) Sophie Chang
- (United States) Ashley Kratzer
- (United States) Katerina Stewart

The following players received entry from the qualifying draw:

- (United States) Francesca Di Lorenzo
- (Israel) Deniz Khazaniuk
- (France) Marine Partaud
- (Italy) Camilla Rosatello

== Champions ==
=== Singles ===
- (United States) Taylor Townsend def. (Colombia) Mariana Duque Mariño, 6–2, 2–6, 6–1

=== Doubles ===
- (Chile) Alexa Guarachi / (New Zealand) Erin Routliffe def. (United States) Sofia Kenin / (United States) Jamie Loeb, 6–4, 2–6, [11–9]
