= 2013 Dothan Pro Tennis Classic =

Tennis tournament

- Date: April 15–21
- Edition: 13th
- Location: Dothan, Alabama, United States

Champions

Singles
- (Croatia) Ajla Tomljanović

Doubles
- (United States) Julia Cohen / (Germany) Tatjana Maria
← 2012 ·	Dothan Pro Tennis Classic	· 2014 →

The 2013 Dothan Pro Tennis Classic was a professional tennis tournament played on outdoor clay courts. It was the thirteenth edition of the tournament which was part of the 2013 ITF Women's Circuit, offering a total of $50,000 in prize money. It took place in Dothan, Alabama, United States, on April 15–21, 2013.

== WTA entrants ==
=== Seeds ===
Country	Player	Rank^{1}	Seed
USA	Coco Vandeweghe	94	1
GER	Tatjana Maria	105	2
USA	Maria Sanchez	112	3
USA	Alexa Glatch	114	4
USA	Julia Cohen	124	5
POR	Michelle Larcher de Brito	132	6
USA	Jessica Pegula	134	7
CHN	Zhang Shuai	135	8

- ^{1} Rankings are as of April 8, 2013

=== Other entrants ===
The following players received wildcards into the singles main draw:

- (United States) Victoria Duval
- (United States) Allie Kiick
- (United States) Sachia Vickery
- (United States) Allie Will

The following players received entry from the qualifying draw:

- (United States) Jan Abaza
- (Switzerland) Belinda Bencic
- (Netherlands) Angelique van der Meet
- (Germany) Laura Siegemund

The following player received entry by a Protected Ranking:

- (Croatia) Ajla Tomljanović

== Champions ==
=== Singles ===
- (Croatia) Ajla Tomljanović def. (China) Zhang Shuai 2–6, 6–4, 6–3

=== Doubles ===
- (United States) Julia Cohen / (Germany) Tatjana Maria def. (United States) Irina Falconi / (United States) Maria Sanchez 6–4, 4–6, [11–9]
