= 2016 Hardee's Pro Classic =

- Date: 18–24 April
- Edition: 16th
- Category: ITF Women's Circuit
- Prize money: $50,000
- Surface: Clay
- Location: Dothan, Alabama, United States

Champions

Singles
- (Sweden) Rebecca Peterson

Doubles
- (United States) Asia Muhammad / (United States) Taylor Townsend
← 2015 ·	Hardee's Pro Classic	· 2017 →

The 2016 Hardee's Pro Classic was a professional tennis tournament played on outdoor clay courts. It was the sixteenth edition of the tournament and part of the 2016 ITF Women's Circuit, offering a total of $50,000 in prize money. It took place in Dothan, Alabama, United States, from 18–24 April 2016.

== Singles main draw entrants ==
=== Seeds ===
Country	Player	Rank^{1}	Seed
USA	Anna Tatishvili	115	1
SWE	Rebecca Peterson	134	2
RUS	Alexandra Panova	155	3
USA	Jessica Pegula	159	4
BEL	Elise Mertens	162	5
USA	Sachia Vickery	175	6
USA	Julia Boserup	178	7
USA	Katerina Stewart	180	8

- ^{1} Rankings as of 11 April 2016.

=== Other entrants ===
The following players received wildcards into the singles main draw:

- (United States) Lauren Albanese
- (United States) Sofia Kenin
- (United States) Claire Liu
- (United States) Alexandra Sanford

The following players received entry from the qualifying draw:

- (Russia) Varvara Flink
- (Ukraine) Olga Ianchuk
- (United States) Raveena Kingsley
- (United States) Taylor Townsend

The following player received entry by a lucky loser:

- (Australia) Olivia Rogowska

The following player received entry by a protected ranking:

- (Norway) Ulrikke Eikeri

== Champions ==
=== Singles ===
- (Sweden) Rebecca Peterson def. (United States) Taylor Townsend, 6–4, 6–2

=== Doubles ===
- (United States) Asia Muhammad / (United States) Taylor Townsend def. (United States) Caitlin Whoriskey / (United States) Keri Wong, 6–0, 6–1
