= 2017 Hardee's Pro Classic – Doubles =

2017 Hardee's Pro Classic

Doubles
- 2017 Hardee's Pro Classic

Final
- Champion: (United States) Emina Bektas (United States) Sanaz Marand
- Runner-up: (United States) Kristie Ahn (Australia) Lizette Cabrera
- Score: 6–3, 1–6, [10–2]

Events
Singles	Doubles
← 2016 ·	Hardee's Pro Classic	· 2018 →

Julia Glushko and Alexandra Panova were the defending champions, but both players chose not to participate.

Emina Bektas and Sanaz Marand won the title, defeating Kristie Ahn and Lizette Cabrera in the final, 6–3, 1–6, [10–2].

== Seeds ==
1. (United States) Ashley Weinhold / (United States) Caitlin Whoriskey (first round)
2. (United States) Madison Brengle / (United States) Jamie Loeb (withdrew)
3. (Poland) Paula Kania / (Bulgaria) Elitsa Kostova (quarterfinals)
4. (Russia) Anna Morgina / (United States) Alexandra Mueller (quarterfinals)

== Draw ==
=== Key ===
- Q = Qualifier
- WC = Wild card
- LL = Lucky loser
- Alt = Alternate
- ITF = ITF entry
- PR = Protected ranking
- SR = Special ranking
- SE = Special exempt
- JE = Junior exempt
- JR = Junior Accelerator Programme entrant
- CO = College Accelerator Programme entrant
- NG = Next Gen Accelerator Program entrant
- w/o = Walkover
- r = Retired
- d = Defaulted

First round
1	(United States) A Weinhold (United States) C Whoriskey	1	2
WC	(United States) S Chang (United States) A Kratzer	6	6
(Indonesia) J Rompies (United States) K Wong	6	6
(United States) E Halbauer (United States) S Kenin	2	4
4	(Russia) A Morgina (United States) A Mueller	7^{7}	6
(United States) J Elbaba (Mexico) R Zarazúa	6^{4}	1
(Ukraine) E Ianchuk (Ukraine) A Kalinina	4	0
(United States) E Bektas (United States) S Marand	6	6
(Belgium) E Boeykens (Austria) P König	4	2
(United States) UM Arconada (Hungary) F Stollár	6	6
WC	(United States) M Schmidt (United States) C Van Nguyen	6^{3}	3
3	(Poland) P Kania (Bulgaria) E Kostova	7^{7}	6
(United States) K Ahn (Australia) L Cabrera	6	6
WC	(Russia) E Bovina (Chile) A Guarachi	4	1
(Indonesia) B Gumulya (United States) M Kobelt	6	4	[3]
Alt	(Brazil) PC Gonçalves (Argentina) C Pella	1	6	[10]

Quarterfinals
WC	(United States) S Chang (United States) A Kratzer	0	7^{7}	[10]
(Indonesia) J Rompies (United States) K Wong	6	6^{4}	[7]
4	(Russia) A Morgina (United States) A Mueller	1	4
(United States) E Bektas (United States) S Marand	6	6
(United States) UM Arconada (Hungary) F Stollár	7	6
3	(Poland) P Kania (Bulgaria) E Kostova	5	2
(United States) K Ahn (Australia) L Cabrera	6	6
Alt	(Brazil) PC Gonçalves (Argentina) C Pella	3	2

Semifinals
WC	(United States) S Chang (United States) A Kratzer	6^{5}	6^{13}
(United States) E Bektas (United States) S Marand	7^{7}	7^{15}
(United States) UM Arconada (Hungary) F Stollár	7^{9}	3	[3]
(United States) K Ahn (Australia) L Cabrera	6^{7}	6	[10]

Final
(United States) E Bektas (United States) S Marand	6	1	[10]
(United States) K Ahn (Australia) L Cabrera	3	6	[2]
