= 2013 Dothan Pro Tennis Classic – Singles =

Singles
- 2013 Dothan Pro Tennis Classic

Final
- Champion: (Croatia) Ajla Tomljanović
- Runner-up: (China) Zhang Shuai
- Score: 2–6, 6–4, 6–3

Events
Singles	Doubles
← 2012 ·	Dothan Pro Tennis Classic	· 2014 →

Camila Giorgi was the defending champion, having won the event in 2012, but chose not to defend her title.

Ajla Tomljanović won the title, defeating Zhang Shuai in the final, 2–6, 6–4, 6–3.

== Seeds ==
1. (United States) Coco Vandeweghe (first round)
2. (Germany) Tatjana Maria (quarterfinals)
3. (United States) Maria Sanchez (second round)
4. (United States) Alexa Glatch (quarterfinals)
5. (United States) Julia Cohen (second round)
6. (Portugal) Michelle Larcher de Brito (first round)
7. (United States) Jessica Pegula (quarterfinals)
8. (China) Zhang Shuai (final)

== Main draw ==
=== Key ===
- Q = Qualifier
- WC = Wild card
- LL = Lucky loser
- Alt = Alternate
- SE = Special exempt
- PR = Protected ranking
- ITF = ITF entry
- JE = Junior exempt
- w/o = Walkover
- r = Retired
- d = Defaulted
- SR = Special ranking

=== Finals ===
Semifinals
PR	(Croatia) Ajla Tomljanović	2	6	7^{7}
(United States) Alison Riske	6	4	6^{3}
(United States) Irina Falconi	1	6	4
8	(China) Zhang Shuai	6	4	6

Final
PR	(Croatia) Ajla Tomljanović	2	6	6
8	(China) Zhang Shuai	6	4	3

=== Top half ===
First round
1	(United States) C Vandeweghe	3	4
Q	(Switzerland) B Bencic	6	6
Q	(Germany) L Siegemund	6^{4}	2
(United States) S Rogers	7^{7}	6
WC	(United States) A Kiick	6	6
WC	(United States) S Vickery	4	4
PR	(Croatia) A Tomljanović	6	6
6	(Portugal) M Larcher de Brito	1	0
4	(United States) A Glatch	7^{7}	6
Q	(United States) J Abaza	6^{4}	3
(Colombia) M Duque Mariño	6	6
(France) I Pavlovic	3	4
(United States) A Riske	3	7^{9}	6
(Austria) P Mayr-Achleitner	6	6^{7}	0
(United States) S Crawford	4	5
5	(United States) J Cohen	6	7

Second round
Q	(Switzerland) B Bencic	4	6	0
(United States) S Rogers	6	3	6
WC	(United States) A Kiick	6^{0}	0
PR	(Croatia) A Tomljanović	7^{7}	6
4	(United States) A Glatch	4	6	6
(Colombia) M Duque Mariño	6	3	4
(United States) A Riske	6	5	6
5	(United States) J Cohen	4	7	4

Quarterfinals
(United States) S Rogers	2	6^{5}
PR	(Croatia) A Tomljanović	6	7^{7}
4	(United States) A Glatch	0	4
(United States) A Riske	6	6

Semifinals
PR	(Croatia) A Tomljanović	2	6	7^{7}
(United States) A Riske	6	4	6^{3}

=== Bottom half ===
First round
7	(United States) J Pegula	6	7
(Italy) A Brianti	4	5
(United States) M Brengle	6	6
(Belarus) I Kremen	3	4
Q	(Netherlands) A van der Meet	5	2
(United States) I Falconi	7	6
WC	(United States) A Will	4	2
3	(United States) M Sanchez	6	6
8	(China) S Zhang	7	5	7^{7}
WC	(United States) V Duval	5	7	6^{3}
(Russia) A Rodionova	7^{7}	6
(Paraguay) V Cepede Royg	6^{2}	2
(Spain) L Pous Tió	6	6
(France) C Feuerstein	4	2
(United States) G Min	6^{4}	2
2	(Germany) T Maria	7^{7}	6

Second round
7	(United States) J Pegula	1	6	6
(United States) M Brengle	6	3	2
(United States) I Falconi	1	6	7
3	(United States) M Sanchez	6	3	5
8	(China) S Zhang	6	6
(Russia) A Rodionova	1	1
(Spain) L Pous Tió	3	3
2	(Germany) T Maria	6	6

Quarterfinals
7	(United States) J Pegula	0	0
(United States) I Falconi	6	6
8	(China) S Zhang	6	6
2	(Germany) T Maria	1	1

Semifinals
(United States) I Falconi	1	6	4
8	(China) S Zhang	6	4	6
