= 2018 Hardee's Pro Classic – Singles =

Singles
- 2018 Hardee's Pro Classic

Final
- Champion: (United States) Taylor Townsend
- Runner-up: (Colombia) Mariana Duque Mariño
- Score: 6–2, 2–6, 6–1

Events
Singles	Doubles
← 2017 ·	Hardee's Pro Classic	· 2019 →

Kristie Ahn was the defending champion but lost in the first round to Barbara Haas.

Taylor Townsend won the title after defeating Mariana Duque Mariño 6–2, 2–6, 6–1 in the final.

== Seeds ==
1. (United States) Jennifer Brady (first round)
2. (United States) Sofia Kenin (quarterfinals)
3. (United States) Kristie Ahn (first round)
4. (United States) Taylor Townsend (champion)
5. (Colombia) Mariana Duque Mariño (final)
6. (Russia) Sofya Zhuk (first round)
7. (United States) Jamie Loeb (second round)
8. (Australia) Lizette Cabrera (quarterfinals)

== Draw ==
=== Key ===
- Q = Qualifier
- WC = Wild card
- LL = Lucky loser
- Alt = Alternate
- SE = Special exempt
- PR = Protected ranking
- ITF = ITF entry
- JE = Junior exempt
- w/o = Walkover
- r = Retired
- d = Defaulted
- SR = Special ranking

=== Finals ===
Semifinals
(Bulgaria) Sesil Karatantcheva	6	3	2
4	(United States) Taylor Townsend	4	6	6
Q	(United States) Francesca Di Lorenzo	2	0
5	(Colombia) Mariana Duque Mariño	6	6

Final
4	(United States) Taylor Townsend	6	2	6
5	(Colombia) Mariana Duque Mariño	2	6	1

=== Top half ===
First round
1	(United States) J Brady	5	0
(Bulgaria) S Karatantcheva	7	6
(Ukraine) O Ianchuk	6^{6}	6	6^{3}
(Japan) R Ozaki	7^{8}	0	7^{7}
(United States) G Min	5	1
(Australia) P Hon	7	6
Q	(Israel) D Khazaniuk	0	1^{r}
8	(Australia) L Cabrera	6	4
4	(United States) T Townsend	6	6
(Norway) U Eikeri	1	4
WC	(United States) A Kratzer	6	6
(Ukraine) A Kalinina	2	4
(Spain) S Soler Espinosa	3	6	6
(United States) I Falconi	6	3	1
Q	(France) M Partaud	6	6
6	(Russia) S Zhuk	0	2

Second round
(Bulgaria) S Karatantcheva	6	6
(Japan) R Ozaki	3	2
(Australia) P Hon	2	7^{7}	1
8	(Australia) L Cabrera	6	6^{5}	6
4	(United States) T Townsend	6	7^{7}
WC	(United States) A Kratzer	4	6^{0}
(Spain) S Soler Espinosa	6	6
Q	(France) M Partaud	1	2

Quarterfinals
(Bulgaria) S Karatantcheva	6	6
8	(Australia) L Cabrera	1	3
4	(United States) T Townsend	6	3	6
(Spain) S Soler Espinosa	3	6	4

Semifinals
(Bulgaria) S Karatantcheva	6	3	2
4	(United States) T Townsend	4	6	6

=== Bottom half ===
First round
7	(United States) J Loeb	3	6	6
(United States) UM Arconada	6	4	1
Q	(United States) F Di Lorenzo	6	6
(United States) K Day	2	0
Q	(Italy) C Rosatello	6	6
(Romania) J Cristian	3	3
(Austria) B Haas	6	6
3	(United States) K Ahn	1	3
5	(Colombia) M Duque Mariño	5	6	6
(United States) V Duval	7	3	0
WC	(United States) K Stewart	7	4	5
(United States) L Chirico	5	6	7
(Austria) J Grabher	7	6
WC	(United States) S Chang	5	4
(Romania) I Bara	5	6	3
2	(United States) S Kenin	7	4	6

Second round
7	(United States) J Loeb	6^{6}	4
Q	(United States) F Di Lorenzo	7^{8}	6
Q	(Italy) C Rosatello	6	3	3
(Austria) B Haas	2	6	6
5	(Colombia) M Duque Mariño	6	3	7^{7}
(United States) L Chirico	2	6	6^{4}
(Austria) J Grabher	1	6	0^{r}
2	(United States) S Kenin	6	4	2

Quarterfinals
Q	(United States) F Di Lorenzo	6	6
(Austria) B Haas	4	1
5	(Colombia) M Duque Mariño	6	6
2	(United States) S Kenin	4	1

Semifinals
Q	(United States) F Di Lorenzo	2	0
5	(Colombia) M Duque Mariño	6	6
