= 2012 Dothan Pro Tennis Classic =

- Date: April 16–22
- Edition: 12th
- Surface: Clay
- Location: Dothan, Alabama, United States

Champions

Singles
- (Italy) Camila Giorgi

Doubles
- (Canada) Eugenie Bouchard / (United States) Jessica Pegula
← 2011 ·	Dothan Pro Tennis Classic	· 2013 →

The 2012 Dothan Pro Tennis Classic was a professional tennis tournament played on clay courts. It was the twelfth edition of the tournament which was part of the 2012 ITF Women's Circuit, offering a total of $50,000 in prize money. It took place in Dothan, Alabama, United States, on April 16–22, 2012.

== WTA entrants ==
=== Seeds ===
Country	Player	Rank^{1}	Seed
CAN	Stéphanie Dubois	92	1
ROU	Edina Gallovits-Hall	96	2
USA	Irina Falconi	104	3
CRO	Mirjana Lučić-Baroni	108	4
RUS	Alla Kudryavtseva	117	5
JPN	Misaki Doi	122	6
USA	Alison Riske	124	7
JPN	Erika Sema	134	8

- ^{1} Rankings are as of April 9, 2012

=== Other entrants ===
The following players received wildcards into the singles main draw:

- (United States) Whitney Jones
- (United States) Madison Keys
- (United States) Melanie Oudin
- (United States) Jessica Pegula

The following players received entry from the qualifying draw:

- (Canada) Sharon Fichman
- (Australia) Sacha Jones
- (United States) Maria Sanchez
- (Russia) Valeria Solovyeva

The following players received entry by a junior exempt:

- (Canada) Eugenie Bouchard

== Champions ==
=== Singles ===
- (Italy) Camila Giorgi def. (Romania) Edina Gallovits-Hall, 6–2, 4–6, 6–4

=== Doubles ===
- (Canada) Eugenie Bouchard / (United States) Jessica Pegula def. (Canada) Sharon Fichman / (Canada) Marie-Ève Pelletier, 6–4, 4–6, [10–5]
