= 2012 Dothan Pro Tennis Classic – Singles =

Singles
- 2012 Dothan Pro Tennis Classic

Final
- Champion: (Italy) Camila Giorgi
- Runner-up: (Romania) Edina Gallovits-Hall
- Score: 6–2, 4–6, 6–4

Events
Singles	Doubles
← 2011 ·	Dothan Pro Tennis Classic	· 2013 →

Melinda Czink was the defending champion, but chose not to participate.

Camila Giorgi won the title, defeating Edina Gallovits-Hall in the final, 6–2, 4–6, 6–4.

== Seeds ==
1. (Canada) Stéphanie Dubois (first round)
2. (Romania) Edina Gallovits-Hall (final)
3. (United States) Irina Falconi (second round)
4. (Croatia) Mirjana Lučić (quarterfinals)
5. (Russia) Alla Kudryavtseva (second round)
6. (Japan) Misaki Doi (quarterfinals)
7. (United States) Alison Riske (first round)
8. (Japan) Erika Sema (first round)

== Main draw ==
=== Key ===
- Q = Qualifier
- WC = Wild card
- LL = Lucky loser
- Alt = Alternate
- SE = Special exempt
- PR = Protected ranking
- ITF = ITF entry
- JE = Junior exempt
- w/o = Walkover
- r = Retired
- d = Defaulted
- SR = Special ranking

=== Finals ===
Semifinals
(Italy) Camila Giorgi	7	7
(United States) Lauren Davis	5	5
(United States) Julia Cohen	3	6	1
2	(Romania) Edina Gallovits-Hall	6	3	6

Final
(Italy) Camila Giorgi	6	4	6
2	(Romania) Edina Gallovits-Hall	2	6	4

=== Top half ===
First round
1	(Canada) S Dubois	2	4
WC	(United States) M Keys	6	6
(United States) J Craybas	5	6	6
WC	(United States) J Pegula	7	0	3
(Bulgaria) D Evtimova	4	6	7^{7}
(United States) A Glatch	6	3	6^{3}
(Italy) C Giorgi	6	3	6
7	(United States) A Riske	1	6	1
4	(Croatia) M Lučić	7^{9}	6
WC	(United States) W Jones	6^{7}	2
(United States) G Brodsky	4	4
WC	(United States) M Oudin	6	6
(United States) T Luzhanska	4	6	2
(United States) L Davis	6	3	6
(Portugal) M Larcher de Brito	2	2
5	(Russia) A Kudryavtseva	6	6

Second round
WC	(United States) M Keys	6	2	2
(United States) J Craybas	3	6	6
(Bulgaria) D Evtimova	3	0
(Italy) C Giorgi	6	6
4	(Croatia) M Lučić	3	7^{7}	6
WC	(United States) M Oudin	6	6^{4}	4
(United States) L Davis	6	6
5	(Russia) A Kudryavtseva	4	0

Quarterfinals
(United States) J Craybas	0	6	3
(Italy) C Giorgi	6	3	6
4	(Croatia) M Lučić	4	4
(United States) L Davis	6	6

Semifinals
(Italy) C Giorgi	7	7
(United States) L Davis	5	5

=== Bottom half ===
First round
8	(Japan) E Sema	3	3
(United States) M Brengle	6	6
Q	(Russia) V Solovieva	6^{5}	6	3
(Russia) E Bychkova	7^{7}	4	2^{r}
(South Africa) C Simmonds	4	3
(United States) J Cohen	6	6
(United States) J Boserup	6	4	5
3	(United States) I Falconi	3	6	7
6	(Japan) M Doi	6	6
(United States) C Scholl	3	4
Q	(Australia) S Jones	4	6	6
JE	(Canada) E Bouchard	6	4	2
(United States) C Vandeweghe	2	5
Q	(Canada) S Fichman	6	7
Q	(United States) M Sanchez	0	3
2	(Romania) E Gallovits-Hall	6	6

Second round
(United States) M Brengle	2	0^{r}
Q	(Russia) V Solovieva	6	3
(United States) J Cohen	6	6
3	(United States) I Falconi	0	4
6	(Japan) M Doi	6	6
Q	(Australia) S Jones	0	3
Q	(Canada) S Fichman	3	1
2	(Romania) E Gallovits-Hall	6	6

Quarterfinals
Q	(Russia) V Solovieva	0	0
(United States) J Cohen	6	6
6	(Japan) M Doi	1	3
2	(Romania) E Gallovits-Hall	6	6

Semifinals
(United States) J Cohen	3	6	1
2	(Romania) E Gallovits-Hall	6	3	6
