= 2015 Hardee's Pro Classic – Doubles =

Doubles
- 2015 Hardee's Pro Classic

Final
- Champions: (United Kingdom) Johanna Konta (United States) Maria Sanchez
- Runners-up: (Brazil) Paula Cristina Gonçalves (Czech Republic) Petra Krejsová
- Score: 6–3, 6–4

Events
Singles	Doubles
← 2014 ·	Hardee's Pro Classic	· 2016 →

Anett Kontaveit and Ilona Kremen were the defending champions, but Kontaveit chose to participate at the 2015 Lale Cup instead whilst Kremen chose not to participate.

Johanna Konta and Maria Sanchez won the title, defeating the second seeds Paula Cristina Gonçalves and Petra Krejsová in the final, 6–3, 6–4.

== Seeds ==
1. (Chinese Taipei) Hsu Chieh-yu / (Argentina) Florencia Molinero (semifinals)
2. (Brazil) Paula Cristina Gonçalves / (Czech Republic) Petra Krejsová (final)
3. (United States) Jacqueline Cako / (United States) Sachia Vickery (first round)
4. (Czech Republic) Kateřina Kramperová / (Australia) Jessica Moore (first round)

== Draw ==
=== Key ===
- Q = Qualifier
- WC = Wild card
- LL = Lucky loser
- Alt = Alternate
- SE = Special exempt
- PR = Protected ranking
- ITF = ITF entry
- JE = Junior exempt
- w/o = Walkover
- r = Retired
- d = Defaulted
- SR = Special ranking

First round
1	(Chinese Taipei) C-y Hsu (Argentina) F Molinero	6	6
(Canada) A Broomfield (Canada) P Januskova	1	0
(United States) S Chang (Russia) A Gabueva	7^{7}	6
(United States) K Stewart (Romania) PM Țig	6^{1}	3
4	(Czech Republic) K Kramperová (Australia) J Moore	1	6^{4}
(Brazil) G Cé (Russia) I Khromacheva	6	7^{7}
(United Kingdom) J Konta (United States) M Sanchez	6	6
(Canada) S Molnar (United States) C Whoriskey	1	3
WC	(United States) E Harman (United States) A Stevenson	6	3	[7]
(United States) L Chirico (United States) G Min	4	6	[10]
(United States) A Mueller (United States) K Wong	7^{7}	6
3	(United States) J Cako (United States) S Vickery	6^{2}	3
(Serbia) V Lukić (Australia) S Sanders	3	2
(United States) S Crawford (United States) J Pegula	6	6
(Ukraine) E Ianchuk (Ukraine) O Ianchuk	2	2
2	(Brazil) PC Gonçalves (Czech Republic) P Krejsová	6	6

Quarterfinals
1	(Chinese Taipei) C-y Hsu (Argentina) F Molinero	6	6
(United States) S Chang (Russia) A Gabueva	2	3
(Brazil) G Cé (Russia) I Khromacheva	3	2
(United Kingdom) J Konta (United States) M Sanchez	6	6
(United States) L Chirico (United States) G Min	6	5	[10]
(United States) A Mueller (United States) K Wong	4	7	[5]
(United States) S Crawford (United States) J Pegula	2	6^{6}
2	(Brazil) PC Gonçalves (Czech Republic) P Krejsová	6	7^{8}

Semifinals
1	(Chinese Taipei) C-y Hsu (Argentina) F Molinero	5	3
(United Kingdom) J Konta (United States) M Sanchez	7	6
(United States) L Chirico (United States) G Min	1	3
2	(Brazil) PC Gonçalves (Czech Republic) P Krejsová	6	6

Final
(United Kingdom) J Konta (United States) M Sanchez	6	6
2	(Brazil) PC Gonçalves (Czech Republic) P Krejsová	3	4
