= 2015 Hardee's Pro Classic =

- Date: 20–26 April
- Edition: 15th
- Category: ITF Women's Circuit
- Prize money: $50,000
- Surface: Clay
- Location: Dothan, Alabama, United States

Champions

Singles
- (United States) Louisa Chirico

Doubles
- (United Kingdom) Johanna Konta / (United States) Maria Sanchez
← 2014 ·	Hardee's Pro Classic	· 2016 →

The 2015 Hardee's Pro Classic is a professional tennis tournament played on outdoor clay courts. It is the fifteenth edition of the tournament and part of the 2015 ITF Women's Circuit, offering a total of $50,000 in prize money. It takes place in Dothan, Alabama, United States, on 20–26 April 2015.

== Singles main draw entrants ==
=== Seeds ===
Country	Player	Rank^{1}	Seed
USA	Grace Min	115	1
POR	Michelle Larcher de Brito	127	2
USA	Sachia Vickery	139	3
USA	Louisa Chirico	141	4
GBR	Johanna Konta	147	5
ROU	Patricia Maria Țig	176	6
USA	Maria Sanchez	180	7
POL	Katarzyna Piter	209	8

- ^{1} Rankings as of 13 April 2015

=== Other entrants ===
The following players received wildcards into the singles main draw:

- (United States) Tornado Alicia Black
- (Canada) Maureen Drake
- (United States) Alexandra Stevenson
- (United States) Katerina Stewart

The following players received entry from the qualifying draw:

- (United States) Jacqueline Cako
- (Ukraine) Elizaveta Ianchuk
- (Australia) Jessica Moore
- (Slovenia) Petra Rampre

The following player received entry by a lucky loser spot:

- (Czech Republic) Kateřina Kramperová

The following player received entry by a protected ranking:

- (United States) Jessica Pegula

== Champions ==
=== Singles ===
- (United States) Louisa Chirico def. (United States) Katerina Stewart, 7–6^{(7–1)}, 3–6, 7–6^{(7–1)}

=== Doubles ===
- (United Kingdom) Johanna Konta / (United States) Maria Sanchez def. (Brazil) Paula Cristina Gonçalves / (Czech Republic) Petra Krejsová, 6–3, 6–4
