= 2013 Citi Open – Women's doubles =

Women's doubles
- 2013 Citi Open

Final
- Champions: (Japan) Shuko Aoyama (Russia) Vera Dushevina
- Runners-up: (Canada) Eugenie Bouchard (United States) Taylor Townsend
- Score: 6–3, 6–3

Details
- Draw: 14
- Seeds: 4

Events
Singles	men	women
Doubles	men	women
- Citi Open

Shuko Aoyama and Chang Kai-chen were the defending champions but Chang chose not to participate. Aoyama successfully defended the title alongside Vera Dushevina, defeating Eugenie Bouchard and Taylor Townsend in the final, 6–3, 6–3.

== Seeds ==
The top seeds received a bye into the quarterfinals.

1. (Japan) Shuko Aoyama / (Russia) Vera Dushevina (champions)
2. (United States) Irina Falconi / (Czech Republic) Eva Hrdinová (semifinals)
3. (Georgia (country)) Anna Tatishvili / (United Kingdom) Heather Watson (quarterfinals)
4. (Colombia) Catalina Castaño / (United States) Jessica Pegula (quarterfinals)

== Draw ==
Key

- Q = Qualifier
- WC = Wild card
- LL = Lucky loser
- Alt = Alternate
- ITF = ITF entry
- PR = Protected ranking
- SR = Special ranking
- SE = Special exempt
- JE = Junior exempt
- JR = Junior Accelerator Programme entrant
- CO = College Accelerator Programme entrant
- NG = Next Gen Accelerator Program entrant
- w/o = Walkover
- r = Retired
- d = Defaulted

=== Draw ===
First round
(United States) A Mueller (Venezuela) A Pérez	7^{8}	6
(United States) A Riske (United Kingdom) N Slater	6^{6}	3
4	(Colombia) C Castaño (United States) J Pegula	6	3	[10]
(Argentina) M Irigoyen (Argentina) P Ormaechea	3	6	[7]
(Bolivia) MF Álvarez Terán (United States) K Wong	6	3	[10]
(United States) A Bhargava (United States) A Weinhold	0	6	[7]
(Canada) E Bouchard (United States) T Townsend	6	6
(United States) J Elie (United States) L Litvak	1	0
(Germany) M Barthel (France) A Cornet	4	4
3	(Georgia (country)) A Tatishvili (United Kingdom) H Watson	6	6
(France) C Garcia (United States) C McHale	6	7
(Slovakia) J Čepelová (Russia) O Puchkova	1	5
(Romania) S Cîrstea (Belgium) Y Wickmayer	3	2
2	(United States) I Falconi (Czech Republic) E Hrdinová	6	6

Quarterfinals
1	(Japan) S Aoyama (Russia) V Dushevina	6	6
(United States) A Mueller (Venezuela) A Pérez	1	4
4	(Colombia) C Castaño (United States) J Pegula	4	7^{9}	[6]
(Bolivia) MF Álvarez Terán (United States) K Wong	6	6^{7}	[10]
(Canada) E Bouchard (United States) T Townsend	6	6
3	(Georgia (country)) A Tatishvili (United Kingdom) H Watson	4	4
(France) C Garcia (United States) C McHale	6	5	[9]
2	(United States) I Falconi (Czech Republic) E Hrdinová	2	7	[11]

Semifinals
1	(Japan) S Aoyama (Russia) V Dushevina	6	6
(Bolivia) MF Álvarez Terán (United States) K Wong	4	3
(Canada) E Bouchard (United States) T Townsend	6	6
2	(United States) I Falconi (Czech Republic) E Hrdinová	4	2

Final
1	(Japan) S Aoyama (Russia) V Dushevina	6	6
(Canada) E Bouchard (United States) T Townsend	3	3
