= 2012 Dothan Pro Tennis Classic – Doubles =

Doubles
- 2012 Dothan Pro Tennis Classic

Final
- Champions: (Canada) Eugenie Bouchard (United States) Jessica Pegula
- Runners-up: (Canada) Sharon Fichman (Canada) Marie-Ève Pelletier
- Score: 6–4, 4–6, [10–5]

Events
Singles	Doubles
← 2011 ·	Dothan Pro Tennis Classic	· 2013 →

Valeria Solovieva and Lenka Wienerová were the defending champions, but Wienerová chose not to participate. Solovieva partnered up with Sally Peers, but lost in the first round to Alexa Glatch and Melanie Oudin.

Eugenie Bouchard and Jessica Pegula won the title, defeating Sharon Fichman and Marie-Ève Pelletier in the final, 6–4, 4–6, [10–5].

== Seeds ==
1. (Canada) Sharon Fichman / (Canada) Marie-Ève Pelletier (final)
2. (United States) Alexa Glatch / (United States) Melanie Oudin (quarterfinals)
3. (United States) Jill Craybas / (United States) Tetiana Luzhanska (first round)
4. (Japan) Erika Sema / (Brazil) Roxane Vaisemberg (quarterfinals)

== Draw ==
=== Key ===
- Q = Qualifier
- WC = Wild card
- LL = Lucky loser
- Alt = Alternate
- SE = Special exempt
- PR = Protected ranking
- ITF = ITF entry
- JE = Junior exempt
- w/o = Walkover
- r = Retired
- d = Defaulted
- SR = Special ranking

=== Draw ===
First round
1	(Canada) S Fichman (Canada) M-È Pelletier	6	6
WC	(United States) G Brodsky (United States) L Litvak	3	3
(United States) J Cohen (United States) C Scholl	4	7	[10]
(United States) A Mueller (United States) A Muhammed	6	5	[5]
3	(United States) J Craybas (United States) T Luzhanska	4	2
(United States) M Sanchez (United States) Y Schnack	6	6
(Brazil) MF Alves (Colombia) C Castaño	6	2	[8]
(Romania) D Enache (Netherlands) D Harmsen	2	6	[10]
WC	(United States) I Falconi (United States) C Vandeweghe	6	6
(Australia) J Moore (Poland) K Piter	2	2
WC	(United States) D Ospina (United States) E Peters	5	2
4	(Japan) E Sema (Brazil) R Vaisemberg	7	6
(Canada) E Bouchard (United States) J Pegula	6	7^{7}
(Russia) E Bovina (Russia) E Bychkova	3	6^{1}
(Australia) S Peers (Russia) V Solovieva	7	0	[4]
2	(United States) A Glatch (United States) M Oudin	5	6	[10]

Quarterfinals
1	(Canada) S Fichman (Canada) M-È Pelletier	6	6
(United States) J Cohen (United States) C Scholl	4	2
(United States) M Sanchez (United States) Y Schnack	7	3	[10]
(Romania) D Enache (Netherlands) D Harmsen	5	6	[3]
WC	(United States) I Falconi (United States) C Vandeweghe	6	5	[10]
4	(Japan) E Sema (Brazil) R Vaisemberg	4	7	[7]
(Canada) E Bouchard (United States) J Pegula	7	6
2	(United States) A Glatch (United States) M Oudin	5	1

Semifinals
1	(Canada) S Fichman (Canada) M-È Pelletier	4	6	[10]
(United States) M Sanchez (United States) Y Schnack	6	4	[6]
WC	(United States) I Falconi (United States) C Vandeweghe	3	7^{7}	[7]
(Canada) E Bouchard (United States) J Pegula	6	6^{3}	[10]

Finals
1	(Canada) S Fichman (Canada) M-È Pelletier	4	6	[5]
(Canada) E Bouchard (United States) J Pegula	6	4	[10]
