= 2016 Hardee's Pro Classic – Doubles =

Doubles
- 2016 Hardee's Pro Classic

Final
- Champions: (United States) Asia Muhammad (United States) Taylor Townsend
- Runners-up: (United States) Caitlin Whoriskey (United States) Keri Wong
- Score: 6–0, 6–1

Events
Singles	Doubles
← 2015 ·	Hardee's Pro Classic	· 2017 →

Johanna Konta and Maria Sanchez were the defending champions, but Konta chose to participate in Stuttgart instead. Sanchez partnered Anna Tatishvili, but they lost in the first round.

Asia Muhammad and Taylor Townsend won the title, defeating Caitlin Whoriskey and Keri Wong in an all-American final, 6–0, 6–1.

== Seeds ==
1. (United States) Asia Muhammad / (United States) Taylor Townsend (champions)
2. (United States) Maria Sanchez / (United States) Anna Tatishvili (first round)
3. (Belgium) Elise Mertens / (Sweden) Rebecca Peterson (semifinals)
4. (United Kingdom) Tara Moore / (Switzerland) Conny Perrin (semifinals)

== Draw ==
=== Key ===
- Q = Qualifier
- WC = Wild card
- LL = Lucky loser
- Alt = Alternate
- SE = Special exempt
- PR = Protected ranking
- ITF = ITF entry
- JE = Junior exempt
- w/o = Walkover
- r = Retired
- d = Defaulted
- SR = Special ranking

First round
1	(United States) A Muhammad (United States) T Townsend	6	6
(Brazil) MF Alves (United States) S Chang	1	3
WC	(Serbia) J Jakšić (United States) M Schmidt	5	6	[4]
(Ukraine) E Ianchuk (Ukraine) O Ianchuk	7	3	[10]
4	(United Kingdom) T Moore (Switzerland) C Perrin	6	6
(Brazil) G Cé (Venezuela) A Gámiz	2	2
(Poland) J Jegiołka (Mexico) R Zarazúa	6^{2}	6	[8]
(United States) J Cako (United States) D Lao	7^{7}	0	[10]
(United States) J Loeb (United States) S Marand	6	6
WC	(United States) C Liu (United States) J Pegula	2	1
(United States) C Bellis (United States) I Neel	2	0
3	(Belgium) E Mertens (Sweden) R Peterson	6	6
(Czech Republic) K Kramperová (United States) B Pera	3	6	[5]
WC	(United States) R Anderson (United States) S Santamaria	6	4	[10]
(United States) C Whoriskey (United States) K Wong	3	6	[10]
2	(United States) M Sanchez (United States) A Tatishvili	6	0	[7]

Quarterfinals
1	(United States) A Muhammad (United States) T Townsend	6	6
(Ukraine) E Ianchuk (Ukraine) O Ianchuk	2	1
4	(United Kingdom) T Moore (Switzerland) C Perrin	6	6
(United States) J Cako (United States) D Lao	3	3
(United States) J Loeb (United States) S Marand	3	2
3	(Belgium) E Mertens (Sweden) R Peterson	6	6
WC	(United States) R Anderson (United States) S Santamaria	1^{r}
(United States) C Whoriskey (United States) K Wong	2

Semifinals
1	(United States) A Muhammad (United States) T Townsend	7^{9}	6
4	(United Kingdom) T Moore (Switzerland) C Perrin	6^{7}	2
3	(Belgium) E Mertens (Sweden) R Peterson	0	3
(United States) C Whoriskey (United States) K Wong	6	6

Final
1	(United States) A Muhammad (United States) T Townsend	6	6
(United States) C Whoriskey (United States) K Wong	0	1
