= 2013 Dothan Pro Tennis Classic – Doubles =

Doubles
- 2013 Dothan Pro Tennis Classic

Final
- Champions: (United States) Julia Cohen (Germany) Tatjana Maria
- Runners-up: (United States) Irina Falconi (United States) Maria Sanchez
- Score: 6–4, 4–6, [11–9]

Events
Singles	Doubles
← 2012 ·	Dothan Pro Tennis Classic	· 2014 →

Eugenie Bouchard and Jessica Pegula were the defending champions, having won the event in 2012, but Bouchard chose not to participate in 2013. Pegula partnered up with Emily Harman, but lost in the quarterfinals to Irina Falconi and Maria Sanchez.

Julia Cohen and Tatjana Maria won the title, defeating Falconi and Sanchez in the final, 6–4, 4–6, [11–9].

== Seeds ==
1. (United States) Irina Falconi / (United States) Maria Sanchez (final)
2. (United States) Julia Cohen / (Germany) Tatjana Maria (champions)
3. (Brazil) Maria Fernanda Alves / (Colombia) Mariana Duque Mariño (semifinals)
4. (United States) Asia Muhammad / (United States) Allie Will (first round)

== Draw ==
=== Key ===
- Q = Qualifier
- WC = Wild card
- LL = Lucky loser
- Alt = Alternate
- SE = Special exempt
- PR = Protected ranking
- ITF = ITF entry
- JE = Junior exempt
- w/o = Walkover
- r = Retired
- d = Defaulted
- SR = Special ranking

First round
1	(United States) I Falconi (United States) M Sanchez	w/o
(Chinese Taipei) H-c Lee (United States) C Vandeweghe
(United States) J Elie (United States) N Pluskota	6^{5}	2
(United States) E Harman (United States) J Pegula	7^{7}	6
3	(Brazil) MF Alves (Colombia) M Duque Mariño	6	6
(Paraguay) V Cepede Royg (Brazil) PC Gonçalves	1	3
(France) I Pavlovic (Russia) A Rodionova	6	6
WC	(United States) S Kalhorn (United States) J Lawrence	2	0
(Belarus) I Kremen (United Kingdom) N Slater	5	1
(United States) M Brengle (United States) A Glatch	7	6
(United States) S Rogers (Croatia) A Tomljanović	3	6	[10]
4	(United States) A Muhammad (United States) A Will	6	1	[7]
(United States) A Mueller (United States) A Riske	6^{2}	6^{4}
WC	(United States) N Hickey (United States) K Pooler	7^{7}	7^{7}
WC	(United States) S Crawford (United States) S Vickery	5	3
2	(United States) J Cohen (Germany) T Maria	7	6

Quarterfinals
1	(United States) I Falconi (United States) M Sanchez	7^{7}	2	[10]
(United States) E Harman (United States) J Pegula	6^{4}	6	[7]
3	(Brazil) MF Alves (Colombia) M Duque Mariño	7	0	[10]
(France) I Pavlovic (Russia) A Rodionova	5	6	[7]
(United States) M Brengle (United States) A Glatch	5	7^{7}	[11]
(United States) S Rogers (Croatia) A Tomljanović	7	6^{4}	[13]
WC	(United States) N Hickey (United States) K Pooler	6	2	[5]
2	(United States) J Cohen (Germany) T Maria	3	6	[10]

Semifinals
1	(United States) I Falconi (United States) M Sanchez	7	6
3	(Brazil) MF Alves (Colombia) M Duque Mariño	5	4
(United States) S Rogers (Croatia) A Tomljanović	4	5
2	(United States) J Cohen (Germany) T Maria	6	7

Final
1	(United States) I Falconi (United States) M Sanchez	4	6	[9]
2	(United States) J Cohen (Germany) T Maria	6	4	[11]
