= 2016 Hardee's Pro Classic – Singles =

Singles
- 2016 Hardee's Pro Classic

Final
- Champion: (Sweden) Rebecca Peterson
- Runner-up: (United States) Taylor Townsend
- Score: 6–4, 6–2

Events
Singles	Doubles
← 2015 ·	Hardee's Pro Classic	· 2017 →

Louisa Chirico was the defending champion, but chose to participate in Stuttgart instead.

Rebecca Peterson won the title, defeating Taylor Townsend in the final, 6–4, 6–2.

== Seeds ==
1. (United States) Anna Tatishvili (quarterfinals)
2. (Sweden) Rebecca Peterson (champion)
3. (Russia) Alexandra Panova (second round)
4. (United States) Jessica Pegula (semifinals)
5. (Belgium) Elise Mertens (first round)
6. (United States) Sachia Vickery (second round)
7. (United States) Julia Boserup (first round)
8. (United States) Katerina Stewart (quarterfinals)

== Main draw ==
=== Key ===
- Q = Qualifier
- WC = Wild card
- LL = Lucky loser
- Alt = Alternate
- SE = Special exempt
- PR = Protected ranking
- ITF = ITF entry
- JE = Junior exempt
- w/o = Walkover
- r = Retired
- d = Defaulted
- SR = Special ranking

=== Finals ===
Semifinals
(Russia) Alla Kudryavtseva	2	2
Q	(United States) Taylor Townsend	6	6
4	(United States) Jessica Pegula	1	6^{2}
2	(Sweden) Rebecca Peterson	6	7^{7}

Final
Q	(United States) Taylor Townsend	4	2
2	(Sweden) Rebecca Peterson	6	6

=== Top half ===
First round
1	(United States) A Tatishvili	7	6
Q	(United States) R Kingsley	5	3
(United States) C Bellis	6	4	6
(United States) J Loeb	3	6	3
(Russia) A Kudryavtseva	6	6
Q	(Ukraine) O Ianchuk	3	2
(United States) A Muhammad	6	6
7	(United States) J Boserup	1	4
3	(Russia) A Panova	5	6	6
(Switzerland) C Perrin	7	1	1
WC	(United States) C Liu	6	6^{6}	1
Q	(United States) T Townsend	2	7^{8}	6
(Argentina) C Pella	2	6^{5}
(United States) J Brady	6	7^{7}
WC	(United States) L Albanese	2	1
6	(United States) S Vickery	6	6

Second round
1	(United States) A Tatishvili	6	6
(United States) C Bellis	3	4
(Russia) A Kudryavtseva	6^{6}	6	6
(United States) A Muhammad	7^{8}	4	3
3	(Russia) A Panova	4	3
Q	(United States) T Townsend	6	6
(United States) J Brady	6	7^{7}
6	(United States) S Vickery	3	6^{4}

Quarterfinals
1	(United States) A Tatishvili	6	2	4
(Russia) A Kudryavtseva	2	6	6
Q	(United States) T Townsend	6	4	6
(United States) J Brady	2	6	3

Semifinals
(Russia) A Kudryavtseva	2	2
Q	(United States) T Townsend	6	6

=== Bottom half ===
First round
8	(United States) K Stewart	7	6
(France) S Foretz	5	1
(United States) R Anderson	1	1
Q	(Russia) V Flink	6	6
LL	(Australia) O Rogowska	2	6	4
(United States) D Lao	6	1	6
WC	(United States) S Kenin	6	4	2
4	(United States) J Pegula	3	6	6
5	(Belgium) E Mertens	6^{1}	3
(United States) M Sanchez	7^{7}	6
WC	(United States) A Sanford	6	0
(Venezuela) A Gámiz	3	0^{r}
PR	(Norway) U Eikeri	1	6	2
(United States) B Pera	6	3	6
(Serbia) J Jakšić	3	1
2	(Sweden) R Peterson	6	6

Second round
8	(United States) K Stewart	6	2	6
Q	(Russia) V Flink	4	6	2
(United States) D Lao	4	3
4	(United States) J Pegula	6	6
(United States) M Sanchez	6	6
WC	(United States) A Sanford	3	4
(United States) B Pera	2	6	2
2	(Sweden) R Peterson	6	4	6

Quarterfinals
8	(United States) K Stewart	3	6	3
4	(United States) J Pegula	6	3	6
(United States) M Sanchez	0	3
2	(Sweden) R Peterson	6	6

Semifinals
4	(United States) J Pegula	1	6^{2}
2	(Sweden) R Peterson	6	7^{7}
