= 2019 Hardee's Pro Classic – Doubles =

Doubles
- 2019 Hardee's Pro Classic

Final
- Champions: (United States) Usue Maitane Arconada (United States) Caroline Dolehide
- Runners-up: (Australia) Destanee Aiava (Australia) Astra Sharma
- Score: 7–6^{(7–5)}, 6–4

Events
Singles	Doubles
← 2018 ·	Hardee's Pro Classic	· 2020 →

Alexa Guarachi and Erin Routliffe were the defending champions, but lost in the first round to Beatrice Gumulya and Abbie Myers.

Usue Maitane Arconada and Caroline Dolehide won the title, defeating Destanee Aiava and Astra Sharma in the final, 7–6^{(7–5)}, 6–4.

== Seeds ==
1. (Chile) Alexa Guarachi / (New Zealand) Erin Routliffe (first round)
2. (Australia) Ellen Perez / (United States) Ena Shibahara (first round)
3. (United States) Quinn Gleason / (United States) Ingrid Neel (quarterfinals)
4. (United States) Sophie Chang / (United States) Alexandra Mueller (quarterfinals)

== Draw ==
=== Key ===
- Q = Qualifier
- WC = Wild card
- LL = Lucky loser
- Alt = Alternate
- SE = Special exempt
- PR = Protected ranking
- ITF = ITF entry
- JE = Junior exempt
- w/o = Walkover
- r = Retired
- d = Defaulted
- SR = Special ranking

=== Draw ===
First round
1	(Chile) A Guarachi (New Zealand) E Routliffe	6	2	[6]
(Indonesia) B Gumulya (Australia) A Myers	4	6	[10]
(Australia) K Birrell (Australia) L Cabrera	6	7
(United States) L Davis (Czech Republic) L Hradecká	3	5
3	(United States) Q Gleason (United States) I Neel	6	2	[11]
(Japan) A Okuno (Romania) E-G Ruse	4	6	[9]
(United States) UM Arconada (United States) C Dolehide	6	6^{5}	[10]
(United States) M Brengle (Ukraine) A Kalinina	4	7^{7}	[4]
(Australia) Z Hives (Mexico) R Zarazúa	3	2
(Belarus) O Govortsova (Russia) K Laskutova	6	6
(United States) F Di Lorenzo (Serbia) J Jakšić	5	6	[2]
4	(United States) S Chang (United States) A Mueller	7	3	[10]
(United States) J Ho (Romania) G Talabă	4	1
(Poland) K Kawa (Poland) K Piter	6	6
(Australia) D Aiava (Australia) A Sharma	6	4	[10]
2	(Australia) E Perez (United States) E Shibahara	3	6	[7]

Quarterfinals
(Indonesia) B Gumulya (Australia) A Myers	1	3
(Australia) K Birrell (Australia) L Cabrera	6	6
3	(United States) Q Gleason (United States) I Neel	3	4
(United States) UM Arconada (United States) C Dolehide	6	6
(Belarus) O Govortsova (Russia) K Laskutova	6	6
4	(United States) S Chang (United States) A Mueller	4	3
(Poland) K Kawa (Poland) K Piter	6^{2}	4
(Australia) D Aiava (Australia) A Sharma	7^{7}	6

Semifinals
(Australia) K Birrell (Australia) L Cabrera	4	6^{5}
(United States) UM Arconada (United States) C Dolehide	6	7^{7}
(Belarus) O Govortsova (Russia) K Laskutova	6^{3}	6	[7]
(Australia) D Aiava (Australia) A Sharma	7^{7}	4	[10]

Final
(United States) UM Arconada (United States) C Dolehide	7^{7}	6
(Australia) D Aiava (Australia) A Sharma	6^{5}	4
