= 2019 Hardee's Pro Classic – Singles =

Singles
- 2019 Hardee's Pro Classic

Final
- Champion: (Slovakia) Kristína Kučová
- Runner-up: (United States) Lauren Davis
- Score: 3–6, 7–6^{(11–9)}, 6–2

Events
Singles	Doubles
← 2018 ·	Hardee's Pro Classic	· 2020 →

Taylor Townsend was the defending champion, but lost in the first round to Sesil Karatantcheva.

Kristína Kučová won the title, defeating Lauren Davis in the final, 3–6, 7–6^{(11–9)}, 6–2.

== Seeds ==
1. (United States) Taylor Townsend (first round)
2. (United States) Madison Brengle (first round)
3. (Ukraine) Anhelina Kalinina (second round)
4. (Australia) Astra Sharma (first round)
5. (United States) Allie Kiick (second round)
6. (United States) Lauren Davis (final)
7. (Australia) Kimberly Birrell (quarterfinals)
8. (United States) Claire Liu (second round)

== Draw ==
=== Key ===
- Q = Qualifier
- WC = Wild card
- LL = Lucky loser
- Alt = Alternate
- SE = Special exempt
- PR = Protected ranking
- ITF = ITF entry
- JE = Junior exempt
- w/o = Walkover
- r = Retired
- d = Defaulted
- SR = Special ranking

=== Finals ===
Semifinals
(United States) Francesca Di Lorenzo	6^{3}	5
Q	(Slovakia) Kristína Kučová	7^{7}	7
(Romania) Elena-Gabriela Ruse	1	6^{3}
6	(United States) Lauren Davis	6	7^{7}

Final
Q	(Slovakia) Kristína Kučová	3	7^{11}	6
6	(United States) Lauren Davis	6	6^{9}	2

=== Top half ===
First round
1	(United States) T Townsend	4	2
(Bulgaria) S Karatantcheva	6	6
(Australia) D Aiava	2	2
(United States) F Di Lorenzo	6	6
Q	(United States) H Chang	4	2
PR	(Czech Republic) L Hradecká	6	6
Q	(Poland) K Kawa	6	3	0^{r}
5	(United States) A Kiick	4	6	3
4	(Australia) A Sharma	2	6	3
Q	(Slovakia) K Kučová	6	3	6
(Australia) E Perez	6	6
WC	(United States) S Chang	1	0
Q	(Australia) A Myers	6	6
(Australia) L Cabrera	0	2
Q	(Belarus) O Govortsova	7^{7}	4	3
7	(Australia) K Birrell	6^{4}	6	6

Second round
(Bulgaria) S Karatantcheva	2	6^{3}
(United States) F Di Lorenzo	6	7^{7}
PR	(Czech Republic) L Hradecká	6	6
5	(United States) A Kiick	3	4
Q	(Slovakia) K Kučová	7	5	6
(Australia) E Perez	5	7	2
Q	(Australia) A Myers	1	5
7	(Australia) K Birrell	6	7

Quarterfinals
(United States) F Di Lorenzo	7^{7}	6
PR	(Czech Republic) L Hradecká	6^{5}	2
Q	(Slovakia) K Kučová	7^{7}	6
7	(Australia) K Birrell	6^{1}	3

Semifinals
(United States) F Di Lorenzo	6^{3}	5
Q	(Slovakia) K Kučová	7^{7}	7

=== Bottom half ===
First round
8	(United States) C Liu	7	6
Q	(Romania) G Talabă	5	2
(Australia) Z Hives	2	6	2
WC	(United States) UM Arconada	6	4	6
(Romania) E-G Ruse	6	6
(United States) A Muhammad	1	4
WC	(United States) L Chirico	2	1
3	(Ukraine) A Kalinina	6	6
6	(United States) L Davis	6	7
(United States) C Dolehide	3	5
(Mexico) R Zarazúa	7	6
WC	(Chile) A Guarachi	5	2
(Japan) H Kuwata	3	4
(Israel) D Khazaniuk	6	6
(Russia) S Zhuk	6^{4}	6	6
2	(United States) M Brengle	7^{7}	4	0

Second round
8	(United States) C Liu	6	2	6^{1}
WC	(United States) UM Arconada	2	6	7^{7}
(Romania) E-G Ruse	7^{7}	6
3	(Ukraine) A Kalinina	6^{2}	2
6	(United States) L Davis	6	6
(Mexico) R Zarazúa	3	2
(Israel) D Khazaniuk	6^{6}	7^{7}	4
(Russia) S Zhuk	7^{8}	6^{3}	6

Quarterfinals
WC	(United States) UM Arconada	3	2
(Romania) E-G Ruse	6	6
6	(United States) L Davis	3
(Russia) S Zhuk	0^{r}

Semifinals
(Romania) E-G Ruse	1	6^{3}
6	(United States) L Davis	6	7^{7}
