= 2019 Hardee's Pro Classic =

- Date: 15–21 April 2019
- Edition: 19th
- Category: ITF Women's World Tennis Tour
- Prize money: $80,000
- Surface: Clay
- Location: Dothan, Alabama, United States

Champions

Singles
- (Slovakia) Kristína Kučová

Doubles
- (United States) Usue Maitane Arconada / (United States) Caroline Dolehide
← 2018 ·	Hardee's Pro Classic	· 2020 →

The 2019 Hardee's Pro Classic was a professional tennis tournament played on outdoor clay courts. It was the nineteenth edition of the tournament which was part of the 2019 ITF Women's World Tennis Tour. It took place in Dothan, Alabama, United States between 15 and 21 April 2019.

== Singles main-draw entrants ==
=== Seeds ===
Country	Player	Rank^{1}	Seed
USA	Taylor Townsend	80	1
USA	Madison Brengle	96	2
UKR	Anhelina Kalinina	123	3
AUS	Astra Sharma	138	4
USA	Allie Kiick	139	5
USA	Lauren Davis	159	6
AUS	Kimberly Birrell	161	7
USA	Claire Liu	163	8

- ^{1} Rankings are as of 8 April 2019.

=== Other entrants ===
The following players received wildcards into the singles main draw:

- (United States) Usue Maitane Arconada
- (United States) Sophie Chang
- (United States) Louisa Chirico
- (Chile) Alexa Guarachi

The following player received entry using a protected ranking:

- (Czech Republic) Lucie Hradecká

The following players received entry from the qualifying draw:

- (United States) Hanna Chang
- (Belarus) Olga Govortsova
- (Poland) Katarzyna Kawa
- (Slovakia) Kristína Kučová
- (Australia) Abbie Myers
- (Romania) Gabriela Talabă

== Champions ==
=== Singles ===
- (Slovakia) Kristína Kučová def. (United States) Lauren Davis, 3–6, 7–6^{(11–9)}, 6–2

=== Doubles ===
- (United States) Usue Maitane Arconada / (United States) Caroline Dolehide def. (Australia) Destanee Aiava / (Australia) Astra Sharma, 7–6^{(7–5)}, 6–4
