= 2018 Hardee's Pro Classic – Doubles =

Doubles
- 2018 Hardee's Pro Classic

Final
- Champions: (Chile) Alexa Guarachi (New Zealand) Erin Routliffe
- Runners-up: (United States) Sofia Kenin (United States) Jamie Loeb
- Score: 6–4, 2–6, [11–9]

Events
Singles	Doubles
← 2017 ·	Hardee's Pro Classic	· 2019 →

Emina Bektas and Sanaz Marand were the defending champions, but both players chose not to participate.

Alexa Guarachi and Erin Routliffe won the title after defeating Sofia Kenin and Jamie Loeb 6–4, 2–6, [11–9] in the final.

== Seeds ==
1. (Romania) Irina Bara / (Spain) Sílvia Soler Espinosa (first round)
2. (Australia) Lizette Cabrera / (Australia) Priscilla Hon (first round)
3. (Italy) Camilla Rosatello / (Georgia (country)) Sofia Shapatava (quarterfinals)
4. (United States) Sofia Kenin / (United States) Jamie Loeb (final)

== Draw ==
=== Key ===
- Q = Qualifier
- WC = Wild card
- LL = Lucky loser
- Alt = Alternate
- SE = Special exempt
- PR = Protected ranking
- ITF = ITF entry
- JE = Junior exempt
- w/o = Walkover
- r = Retired
- d = Defaulted
- SR = Special ranking

=== Draw ===
First round
1	(Romania) I Bara (Spain) S Soler Espinosa	6	3	[9]
(Romania) J Cristian (Japan) R Ozaki	3	6	[11]
(United States) Q Gleason (United States) A Kratzer	6	6
(France) M Partaud (United States) J Robinson	2	3
3	(Italy) C Rosatello (Georgia (country)) S Shapatava	4	6	[10]
(Brazil) PC Gonçalves (Chinese Taipei) C-y Hsu	6	4	[4]
(Ukraine) O Ianchuk (United States) K Stewart	1	2
(Chile) A Guarachi (New Zealand) E Routliffe	6	6
(United States) S Chang (United States) A Mueller	7	6
(United States) M Schmidt (United States) R Yurovsky	5	1
(United States) I Falconi (United States) M Sanchez	5	1
4	(United States) S Kenin (United States) J Loeb	7	6
(United States) UM Arconada (United States) F Di Lorenzo	6	6
WC	(United States) M Closs (United States) A Nefedova	0	4
(Norway) U Eikeri (United States) I Neel	7	3	[10]
2	(Australia) L Cabrera (Australia) P Hon	5	6	[3]

Quarterfinals
(Romania) J Cristian (Japan) R Ozaki	2	3
(United States) Q Gleason (United States) A Kratzer	6	6
3	(Italy) C Rosatello (Georgia (country)) S Shapatava	6^{2}	6	[6]
(Chile) A Guarachi (New Zealand) E Routliffe	7^{7}	3	[10]
(United States) S Chang (United States) A Mueller	2	3
4	(United States) S Kenin (United States) J Loeb	6	6
(United States) UM Arconada (United States) F Di Lorenzo	4	1
(Norway) U Eikeri (United States) I Neel	6	6

Semifinals
(United States) Q Gleason (United States) A Kratzer	6^{5}	4
(Chile) A Guarachi (New Zealand) E Routliffe	7^{7}	6
4	(United States) S Kenin (United States) J Loeb	6	7
(Norway) U Eikeri (United States) I Neel	1	5

Final
(Chile) A Guarachi (New Zealand) E Routliffe	6	2	[11]
4	(United States) S Kenin (United States) J Loeb	4	6	[9]
