= 2013 Citi Open – Men's singles =

Men's singles
- 2013 Citi Open

Final
- Champion: (Argentina) Juan Martín del Potro
- Runner-up: (United States) John Isner
- Score: 3–6, 6–1, 6–2

Details
- Draw: 48 (6Q / 5WC)
- Seeds: 16

Events
Singles	men	women
Doubles	men	women
- Washington Open

Alexandr Dolgopolov was the defending champion, but lost to Indian qualifier Somdev Devvarman in the second round.

Juan Martín del Potro won his third Citi Open title and second title of the year, defeating John Isner in the final, 3–6, 6–1, 6–2.

== Seeds ==
All seeds received a bye into the second round.

1. (Argentina) Juan Martín del Potro (champion)
2. (Japan) Kei Nishikori (third round)
3. (Germany) Tommy Haas (semifinals)
4. (Canada) Milos Raonic (third round)
5. (France) Gilles Simon (second round)
6. (United States) Sam Querrey (third round)
7. (South Africa) Kevin Anderson (quarterfinals)
8. (United States) John Isner (final)
9. (Ukraine) Alexandr Dolgopolov (second round)
10. (Spain) Feliciano López (withdrew because of fatigue)
11. (Bulgaria) Grigor Dimitrov (quarterfinals)
12. (France) Julien Benneteau (second round)
13. (Croatia) Ivan Dodig (third round)
14. (Australia) Bernard Tomic (third round)
15. (Russia) Nikolay Davydenko (second round)
16. (Cyprus) Marcos Baghdatis (quarterfinals)
17. (France) Michaël Llodra (second round)

== Draw ==
Key

- Q = Qualifier
- WC = Wild card
- LL = Lucky loser
- Alt = Alternate
- ITF = ITF entry
- PR = Protected ranking
- SR = Special ranking
- SE = Special exempt
- JE = Junior exempt
- JR = Junior Accelerator Programme entrant
- CO = College Accelerator Programme entrant
- NG = Next Gen Accelerator Program entrant
- w/o = Walkover
- r = Retired
- d = Defaulted

=== Finals ===
Quarterfinals
1/WC	(Argentina) Juan Martín del Potro	7^{7}	6
7	(South Africa) Kevin Anderson	6^{0}	3
3	(Germany) Tommy Haas	7^{7}	7^{7}
11	(Bulgaria) Grigor Dimitrov	6^{5}	6^{3}
(Russia) Dmitry Tursunov	6	4	7^{7}
(Australia) Marinko Matosevic	3	6	6^{4}
8	(United States) John Isner	6^{5}	6	6
16	(Cyprus) Marcos Baghdatis	7^{7}	4	4

Semifinals
1/WC	(Argentina) Juan Martín del Potro	7^{7}	6
3	(Germany) Tommy Haas	6^{4}	3
(Russia) Dmitry Tursunov	7^{9}	3	4
8	(United States) John Isner	6^{7}	6	6

Final
1/WC	(Argentina) Juan Martín del Potro	3	6	6
8	(United States) John Isner	6	1	2

=== Top half ===
==== Section 1 ====
First round
(Australia) L Hewitt	3	5
(United States) R Harrison	6	7
(Belgium) D Goffin	6	6
(Chinese Taipei) Y-h Lu	4	4
Q	(Australia) M Ebden	6	1	3
(United States) M Fish	2	6	6
WC	(Australia) J Duckworth	6	6
Q	(Japan) Y Sugita	2	2

Second round
1/WC	(Argentina) JM del Potro	6	7
(United States) R Harrison	1	5
(Belgium) D Goffin	1	3
14	(Australia) B Tomic	6	6
12	(France) J Benneteau	3	5
(United States) M Fish	6	7
WC	(Australia) J Duckworth	3	6	4
7	(South Africa) K Anderson	6	3	6

Third round
1/WC	(Argentina) JM del Potro	6	6
14	(Australia) B Tomic	3	3
(United States) M Fish	6^{2}	1
7	(South Africa) K Anderson	7^{7}	6

Quarterfinals
1/WC	(Argentina) JM del Potro	7^{7}	6
7	(South Africa) K Anderson	6^{0}	3

==== Section 2 ====
First round
(Slovenia) G Žemlja	1	7^{10}	1
Q	(United States) T Smyczek	6	6^{8}	6
(Lithuania) R Berankis	6	3	2
(Germany) T Kamke	3	6	6
(Belgium) X Malisse	4	6	6
(United States) R Ram	6	3	2
(Uzbekistan) D Istomin	6	6
(Colombia) S Giraldo	3	4

Second round
3	(Germany) T Haas	3	7	6
Q	(United States) T Smyczek	6	5	3
(Germany) T Kamke	6	2	3
13	(Croatia) I Dodig	2	6	6
11	(Bulgaria) G Dimitrov	7^{7}	6
(Belgium) X Malisse	6^{4}	4
(Uzbekistan) D Istomin	6	3	6^{9}
6	(United States) S Querrey	4	6	7^{11}

Third round
3	(Germany) T Haas	6	4	7
13	(Croatia) I Dodig	4	6	5
11	(Bulgaria) G Dimitrov	6	6
6	(United States) S Querrey	3	2

Quarterfinals
3	(Germany) T Haas	7^{7}	7^{7}
11	(Bulgaria) G Dimitrov	6^{5}	6^{3}

=== Bottom half ===
==== Section 3 ====
First round
LL	(Canada) J Levine	6^{5}	5
(Russia) D Tursunov	7^{7}	7
(Czech Republic) R Štěpánek	7^{7}	6
WC	(United States) S Johnson	6^{3}	3
(United States) J Blake	2	6^{6}
(Australia) M Matosevic	6	7^{8}
WC	(United States) D Kudla	6^{2}	2
Q	(Australia) S Groth	7^{7}	6

Second round
5	(France) G Simon	4	2
(Russia) D Tursunov	6	6
(Czech Republic) R Štěpánek	6	6
17	(France) M Llodra	2	1
15	(Russia) N Davydenko	4	5
(Australia) M Matosevic	6	7
Q	(Australia) S Groth	5	4
4	(Canada) M Raonic	7	6

Third round
(Russia) D Tursunov	4	6	7
(Czech Republic) R Štěpánek	6	4	5
(Australia) M Matosevic	7	7^{9}
4	(Canada) M Raonic	5	6^{7}

Quarterfinals
(Russia) D Tursunov	6	4	7^{7}
(Australia) M Matosevic	3	6	6^{4}

==== Section 4 ====
First round
(Russia) A Bogomolov Jr.	6	4	3
Q	(United States) A Kuznetsov	3	6	6
Q	(India) S Devvarman	7	6
LL	(United States) R Williams	5	1
(Slovakia) L Lacko	1	6	6
(Colombia) A Falla	6	4	4
WC	(United States) J Sock	6	6
(Netherlands) I Sijsling	4	2

Second round
8	(United States) J Isner	7^{7}	7^{7}
Q	(United States) A Kuznetsov	6^{2}	6^{4}
Q	(India) S Devvarman	6	7^{7}
9	(Ukraine) A Dolgopolov	3	6^{4}
16	(Cyprus) M Baghdatis	6^{2}	6	6
(Slovakia) L Lacko	7^{7}	2	4
WC	(United States) J Sock	5	2
2	(Japan) K Nishikori	7	6

Third round
8	(United States) J Isner	7	7
Q	(India) S Devvarman	5	5
16	(Cyprus) M Baghdatis	6	6
2	(Japan) K Nishikori	1	2

Quarterfinals
8	(United States) J Isner	6^{5}	6	6
16	(Cyprus) M Baghdatis	7^{7}	4	4

== Qualifying ==
=== Seeds ===
1. (Australia) Matthew Ebden (qualified)
2. (United States) Rhyne Williams (qualifying competition, lucky loser)
3. (United States) Tim Smyczek (qualified)
4. (Canada) Jesse Levine (qualifying competition, lucky loser)
5. (India) Somdev Devvarman (qualified)
6. (United States) Alex Kuznetsov (qualified)
7. (Ukraine) Illya Marchenko (first round)
8. (Japan) Yūichi Sugita (qualified)
9. (United States) Donald Young (first round)
10. (Tunisia) Malek Jaziri (qualifying competition)
11. (Uzbekistan) Farrukh Dustov (first round)
12. (Australia) Samuel Groth (qualified)

=== Qualifiers ===
1. (Australia) Matthew Ebden
2. (Australia) Samuel Groth
3. (United States) Tim Smyczek
4. (Japan) Yūichi Sugita
5. (India) Somdev Devvarman
6. (United States) Alex Kuznetsov

=== Lucky losers ===
1. (United States) Rhyne Williams
2. (Canada) Jesse Levine

=== Qualifying draw ===
==== First qualifier ====
First round					Qualifying competition
					1	(Australia) Matthew Ebden	6	6
	(India) Saketh Myneni	6^{2}	6	6		(India) Saketh Myneni	3	1
9	(United States) Donald Young	7^{7}	3	4

==== Second qualifier ====
First round
2	(United States) Rhyne Williams	6	3	6
(United States) Robby Ginepri	2	6	3
(India) Sanam Singh	0	5
12	(Australia) Samuel Groth	6	7

Qualifying competition
2	(United States) Rhyne Williams	2	7^{7}	2
12	(Australia) Samuel Groth	6	6^{5}	6

==== Third qualifier ====
First round
3	(United States) Tim Smyczek	6	2	6
Alt	(Austria) Alexander Peya	0	6	3
WC	(United States) Jarmere Jenkins	6	6
11	(Uzbekistan) Farrukh Dustov	4	3

Qualifying competition
3	(United States) Tim Smyczek	5	6	6
WC	(United States) Jarmere Jenkins	7	2	2

==== Fourth qualifier ====
First round
4	(Canada) Jesse Levine	6	7^{7}
(Ukraine) Denys Molchanov	4	6^{5}
(United States) Sekou Bangoura	3	5
8	(Japan) Yūichi Sugita	6	7

Qualifying competition
4	(Canada) Jesse Levine	6	4	3
8	(Japan) Yūichi Sugita	2	6	6

==== Fifth qualifier ====
First round
5	(India) Somdev Devvarman	7	6
(United States) Jesse Witten	5	0
(United States) Christian Harrison	6	3	7^{9}
7	(Ukraine) Illya Marchenko	3	6	6^{7}

Qualifying competition
5	(India) Somdev Devvarman	6	6
(United States) Christian Harrison	0	1

==== Sixth qualifier ====
First round
6	(United States) Alex Kuznetsov	6	3	6
WC	(United States) Mac Styslinger	3	6	1
WC	(United States) Mitchell Frank	4	2
10	(Tunisia) Malek Jaziri	6	6

Qualifying competition
6	(United States) Alex Kuznetsov	6	7^{7}
10	(Tunisia) Malek Jaziri	4	6^{4}
