= 2013 Citi Open – Women's singles =

Women's singles
- 2013 Citi Open

Final
- Champion: (Slovakia) Magdaléna Rybáriková
- Runner-up: (Germany) Andrea Petkovic
- Score: 6–4, 7–6^{(7–2)}

Details
- Draw: 32
- Seeds: 8

Events
Singles	men	women
Doubles	men	women
- Citi Open

Seventh-seeded Magdaléna Rybáriková was the defending singles champion, and she successfully defended her title, defeating Andrea Petkovic in the final, 6–4, 7–6^{(7–2)}. This was Rybáriková's final WTA singles title before her retirement in 2020.

== Seeds ==
1. (Germany) Angelique Kerber (quarterfinals)
2. (United States) Sloane Stephens (first round)
3. (Russia) Ekaterina Makarova (semifinals)
4. (France) Alizé Cornet (semifinals)
5. (Romania) Sorana Cîrstea (quarterfinals)
6. (Germany) Mona Barthel (second round)
7. (Slovakia) Magdaléna Rybáriková (champion)
8. (United States) Madison Keys (second round)

== Draw ==
Key

- Q = Qualifier
- WC = Wild card
- LL = Lucky loser
- Alt = Alternate
- ITF = ITF entry
- PR = Protected ranking
- SR = Special ranking
- SE = Special exempt
- JE = Junior exempt
- JR = Junior Accelerator Programme entrant
- CO = College Accelerator Programme entrant
- NG = Next Gen Accelerator Program entrant
- w/o = Walkover
- r = Retired
- d = Defaulted

=== Finals ===
Semifinals
7	(Slovakia) Magdaléna Rybáriková	6	6
3	(Russia) Ekaterina Makarova	2	0
4	(France) Alizé Cornet	5	3
(Germany) Andrea Petkovic	7	6

Final
7	(Slovakia) Magdaléna Rybáriková	6	7^{7}
(Germany) Andrea Petkovic	4	6^{2}

=== Top half ===
First round
1/WC	(Germany) A Kerber	6	6
Q	(United States) I Falconi	2	3
(United States) M Oudin	7	6
(Australia) A Rodionova	5	3
(Slovakia) J Čepelová	6	0	6
(Netherlands) K Bertens	4	6	3
(United States) C McHale	6	4	2
7	(Slovakia) M Rybáriková	2	6	6
3	(Russia) E Makarova	6	6
(Canada) E Bouchard	4	2
(France) C Garcia	0	7^{7}	6
(Georgia (country)) A Tatishvili	6	6^{5}	4
WC	(United States) T Townsend	3	0
(Romania) M Niculescu	6	6
Q	(Portugal) M Larcher de Brito	5	3
8	(United States) M Keys	7	6

Second round
1/WC	(Germany) A Kerber	7	6
(United States) M Oudin	5	0
(Slovakia) J Čepelová	5	7	5
7	(Slovakia) M Rybáriková	7	5	7
3	(Russia) E Makarova	6	6
(France) C Garcia	2	0
(Romania) M Niculescu	6	2	7^{8}
8	(United States) M Keys	1	6	6^{6}

Quarterfinals
1/WC	(Germany) A Kerber	6^{0}	6	3
7	(Slovakia) M Rybáriková	7^{7}	3	6
3	(Russia) E Makarova	1
(Romania) M Niculescu	0^{r}

Semifinals
7	(Slovakia) M Rybáriková	6	6
3	(Russia) E Makarova	2	0

=== Bottom half ===
First round
5	(Romania) S Cîrstea	7	1
(Ukraine) L Tsurenko	5	1^{r}
(United States) V King	3	5
(United States) A Riske	6	7
Q	(United States) A Mueller	7^{7}	4	3
(United Kingdom) H Watson	6^{5}	6	6
(Belgium) Y Wickmayer	1	3
4	(France) A Cornet	6	6
6	(Germany) M Barthel	6	6
(Switzerland) S Vögele	2	2
Q	(United States) J Pegula	2	5
(Germany) A Petkovic	6	7
(Argentina) P Ormaechea	6	6
WC	(United States) B Capra	1	1
(Russia) O Puchkova	7	6
2	(United States) S Stephens	5	3

Second round
5	(Romania) S Cîrstea	3	6	6
(United States) A Riske	6	2	3
(United Kingdom) H Watson	4	4
4	(France) A Cornet	6	6
6	(Germany) M Barthel	2	2
(Germany) A Petkovic	6	6
(Argentina) P Ormaechea	3	6	4
(Russia) O Puchkova	6	3	1^{d}

Quarterfinals
5	(Romania) S Cîrstea	6^{5}	2
4	(France) A Cornet	7^{7}	6
(Germany) A Petkovic	4	6	6
(Argentina) P Ormaechea	6	1	3

Semifinals
4	(France) A Cornet	5	3
(Germany) A Petkovic	7	6

== Qualifying ==
=== Seeds ===
1. (Portugal) Michelle Larcher de Brito (qualified)
2. (United States) Jessica Pegula (qualified)
3. (Russia) Vera Dushevina (withdrew)
4. (United States) Irina Falconi (qualified)
5. (Argentina) María Irigoyen (first round)
6. (Venezuela) Adriana Pérez (first round)
7. (Japan) Shuko Aoyama (qualifying competition)
8. (United States) Victoria Duval (qualifying competition)
9. (United States) Ashley Weinhold (first round)

=== Qualifiers ===
1. (Portugal) Michelle Larcher de Brito
2. (United States) Jessica Pegula
3. (United States) Alexandra Mueller
4. (United States) Irina Falconi

=== Draw ===
==== First qualifier ====
First round
1	(Portugal) Michelle Larcher de Brito	7	6
(United States) Louisa Chirico	5	1
(United States) Lena Litvak	4	5
8/WC	(United States) Victoria Duval	6	7

Qualifying competition
1	(Portugal) Michelle Larcher de Brito	7	4	6
8/WC	(United States) Victoria Duval	5	6	2

==== Second qualifier ====
First round
2	(United States) Jessica Pegula	6	6
(Russia) Angelina Gabueva	2	4
(United States) Jessica Lawrence	3	1
7	(Japan) Shuko Aoyama	6	6

Qualifying competition
2	(United States) Jessica Pegula	6	6
7	(Japan) Shuko Aoyama	4	2

==== Third qualifier ====
First round
9	(United States) Ashley Weinhold	0	1
(United States) Alexandra Mueller	6	6
WC	(United States) Usue Maitane Arconada	7	6
5	(Argentina) María Irigoyen	5	3

Qualifying competition
(United States) Alexandra Mueller	6	6
WC	(United States) Usue Maitane Arconada	1	1

==== Fourth qualifier ====
First round					Qualifying competition
					4	(United States) Irina Falconi	6	6^{3}	6
	(United States) Jennifer Elie	6	4	6		(United States) Jennifer Elie	3	7^{7}	0
6	(Venezuela) Adriana Pérez	0	6	2
