= 2013 Citi Open – Men's doubles =

Men's doubles
- 2013 Citi Open

Final
- Champions: (France) Julien Benneteau (Serbia) Nenad Zimonjić
- Runners-up: (United States) Mardy Fish (Czech Republic) Radek Štěpánek
- Score: 7–6^{(7–5)}, 7–5

Details
- Draw: 16
- Seeds: 4

Events
Singles	men	women
Doubles	men	women
- Washington Open

Treat Conrad Huey and Dominic Inglot were the defending champions, but lost in the semifinals to Julien Benneteau and Nenad Zimonjić.
The unseeded team of Benneteau and Zimonjić went on to win the title, defeating Mardy Fish and Radek Štěpánek in the final, 7–6^{(7–5)}, 7–5.

== Seeds ==
1. (Austria) Alexander Peya / (Brazil) Bruno Soares (first round)
2. (Pakistan) Aisam-ul-Haq Qureshi / (Netherlands) Jean-Julien Rojer (first round)
3. (Sweden) Robert Lindstedt / (Canada) Daniel Nestor (first round)
4. (Croatia) Ivan Dodig / (Brazil) Marcelo Melo (first round)

== Draw ==
Key

- Q = Qualifier
- WC = Wild card
- LL = Lucky loser
- Alt = Alternate
- ITF = ITF entry
- PR = Protected ranking
- SR = Special ranking
- SE = Special exempt
- JE = Junior exempt
- JR = Junior Accelerator Programme entrant
- CO = College Accelerator Programme entrant
- NG = Next Gen Accelerator Program entrant
- w/o = Walkover
- r = Retired
- d = Defaulted

=== Draw ===
First round
1	(Austria) A Peya (Brazil) B Soares	2	7^{7}	[5]
(Germany) A Begemann (India) R Bopanna	6	6^{4}	[10]
(Philippines) TC Huey (United Kingdom) D Inglot	6	6^{4}	[10]
(United Kingdom) C Fleming (United Kingdom) J Marray	4	7^{7}	[7]
3	(Sweden) R Lindstedt (Canada) D Nestor	6^{7}	2
(France) J Benneteau (Serbia) N Zimonjić	7^{9}	6
(Mexico) S González (United States) S Lipsky	7^{7}	6
WC	(United States) J Blake (United States) E Butorac	6^{3}	3
(Poland) M Fyrstenberg (Poland) M Matkowski	6	7^{7}
(Ukraine) A Dolgopolov (Russia) D Tursunov	3	6^{4}
(United States) M Fish (Czech Republic) R Štěpánek	4	7	[11]
4	(Croatia) I Dodig (Brazil) M Melo	6	5	[9]
(Bulgaria) G Dimitrov (France) M Llodra	3	6	[15]
(Belarus) M Mirnyi (Romania) H Tecău	6	3	[13]
WC	(United States) S Johnson (United States) S Querrey	6	6
2	(Pakistan) A-u-H Qureshi (Netherlands) J-J Rojer	4	3

Quarterfinals
(Germany) A Begemann (India) R Bopanna	4	6^{1}
(Philippines) TC Huey (United Kingdom) D Inglot	6	7^{7}
(France) J Benneteau (Serbia) N Zimonjić	6	6
(Mexico) S González (United States) S Lipsky	3	4
(Poland) M Fyrstenberg (Poland) M Matkowski	7^{7}	5	[7]
(United States) M Fish (Czech Republic) R Štěpánek	6^{5}	7	[10]
(Bulgaria) G Dimitrov (France) M Llodra	6	6
WC	(United States) S Johnson (United States) S Querrey	4	3

Semifinals
(Philippines) TC Huey (United Kingdom) D Inglot	3	4
(France) J Benneteau (Serbia) N Zimonjić	6	6
(United States) M Fish (Czech Republic) R Štěpánek	6	3	[10]
(Bulgaria) G Dimitrov (France) M Llodra	3	6	[6]

Final
(France) J Benneteau (Serbia) N Zimonjić	7^{7}	7
(United States) M Fish (Czech Republic) R Štěpánek	6^{5}	5
