= 2015 Hardee's Pro Classic – Singles =

Singles
- 2015 Hardee's Pro Classic

Final
- Champion: (United States) Louisa Chirico
- Runner-up: (United States) Katerina Stewart
- Score: 7–6^{(7–1)}, 3–6, 7–6^{(7–1)}

Events
Singles	Doubles
← 2014 ·	Hardee's Pro Classic	· 2016 →

Grace Min was the defending champion, but lost to Alexandra Stevenson in the first round.

Fourth seed Louisa Chirico won the title, defeating wildcard Katerina Stewart in an all-American final, 7–6^{(7–1)}, 3–6, 7–6^{(7–1)}.

== Seeds ==
1. (United States) Grace Min (first round)
2. (Portugal) Michelle Larcher de Brito (quarterfinals)
3. (United States) Sachia Vickery (first round)
4. (United States) Louisa Chirico (champion)
5. (United Kingdom) Johanna Konta (second round)
6. (Romania) Patricia Maria Țig (second round)
7. (United States) Maria Sanchez (first round)
8. (Poland) Katarzyna Piter (second round)

== Main draw ==
=== Key ===
- Q = Qualifier
- WC = Wild card
- LL = Lucky loser
- Alt = Alternate
- SE = Special exempt
- PR = Protected ranking
- ITF = ITF entry
- JE = Junior exempt
- w/o = Walkover
- r = Retired
- d = Defaulted
- SR = Special ranking

=== Finals ===
Semifinals
(Brazil) Paula Cristina Gonçalves	4	0
WC	(United States) Katerina Stewart	6	6
4	(United States) Louisa Chirico	6^{3}	6	6
(Serbia) Jovana Jakšić	7^{7}	3	0

Final
WC	(United States) Katerina Stewart	6^{1}	6	6^{1}
4	(United States) Louisa Chirico	7^{7}	3	7^{7}

=== Top half ===
First round
1	(United States) G Min	1	6^{6}
WC	(United States) A Stevenson	6	7^{8}
(United States) E Gallovits-Hall	2	6	4
(Ukraine) O Ianchuk	6	4	6
(Brazil) PC Gonçalves	6	6
(Argentina) F Molinero	4	1
(Russia) I Khromacheva	7	2	4
8	(Poland) K Piter	5	6	6
3	(United States) S Vickery	4	6^{4}
(Brazil) G Cé	6	7^{7}
(United States) S Crawford	6	6
(Sweden) S Arvidsson	2	4
LL	(Czech Republic) K Kramperová	1	1
WC	(United States) K Stewart	6	6
(United States) J Boserup	4	2
5	(United Kingdom) J Konta	6	6

Second round
WC	(United States) A Stevenson	6	6
(Ukraine) O Ianchuk	1	3
(Brazil) PC Gonçalves	6^{6}	7	7^{8}
8	(Poland) K Piter	7^{8}	5	6^{6}
(Brazil) G Cé	4	6	0
(United States) S Crawford	6	4	6
WC	(United States) K Stewart	6	4	6
5	(United Kingdom) J Konta	1	6	3

Quarterfinals
WC	(United States) A Stevenson	1	1
(Brazil) PC Gonçalves	6	6
(United States) S Crawford	6	5	1
WC	(United States) K Stewart	3	7	6

Semifinals
(Brazil) PC Gonçalves	4	0
WC	(United States) K Stewart	6	6

=== Bottom half ===
First round
7	(United States) M Sanchez	4	3
PR	(United States) J Pegula	6	6
WC	(Canada) M Drake	3	6	2
(Chinese Taipei) C-y Hsu	6	3	6
(United States) B Pera	7^{7}	6
Q	(Ukraine) E Ianchuk	6^{5}	3
(United States) A Kiick	3	6^{4}
4	(United States) L Chirico	6	7^{7}
6	(Romania) PM Țig	6	6
Q	(United States) J Cako	2	2
(United States) C Whoriskey	6^{7}	6	5
(Serbia) J Jakšić	7^{9}	2	7
Q	(Slovenia) P Rampre	2	0
Q	(Australia) J Moore	6	6
WC	(United States) TA Black	3	6	2
2	(Portugal) M Larcher de Brito	6	2	6

Second round
PR	(United States) J Pegula	7	6
(Chinese Taipei) C-y Hsu	5	2
(United States) B Pera	4	5
4	(United States) L Chirico	6	7
6	(Romania) PM Țig	6	3	1
(Serbia) J Jakšić	3	6	6
Q	(Australia) J Moore	2	0
2	(Portugal) M Larcher de Brito	6	6

Quarterfinals
PR	(United States) J Pegula	3	6	3
4	(United States) L Chirico	6	3	6
(Serbia) J Jakšić	6	6
2	(Portugal) M Larcher de Brito	3	1

Semifinals
4	(United States) L Chirico	6^{3}	6	6
(Serbia) J Jakšić	7^{7}	3	0
