= 2017 Hardee's Pro Classic – Singles =

Singles
- 2017 Hardee's Pro Classic

Final
- Champion: (United States) Kristie Ahn
- Runner-up: (United States) Amanda Anisimova
- Score: 1–6, 6–2, 6–2

Events
Singles	Doubles
← 2016 ·	Hardee's Pro Classic	· 2018 →

Rebecca Peterson was the defending champion, but chose not to participate.

Kristie Ahn won the title, defeating Amanda Anisimova in the final, 1–6, 6–2, 6–2.

== Seeds ==
1. (United States) Madison Brengle (first round)
2. (United States) Taylor Townsend (first round)
3. (Germany) Tatjana Maria (first round)
4. (Tunisia) Ons Jabeur (second round)
5. (Bulgaria) Elitsa Kostova (first round)
6. (United States) Jamie Loeb (second round)
7. (Australia) Lizette Cabrera (first round)
8. (United States) Kristie Ahn (champion)

== Draw ==
=== Key ===
- Q = Qualifier
- WC = Wild card
- LL = Lucky loser
- Alt = Alternate
- ITF = ITF entry
- PR = Protected ranking
- SR = Special ranking
- SE = Special exempt
- JE = Junior exempt
- JR = Junior Accelerator Programme entrant
- CO = College Accelerator Programme entrant
- NG = Next Gen Accelerator Program entrant
- w/o = Walkover
- r = Retired
- d = Defaulted

=== Finals ===
Semifinals
8	(United States) Kristie Ahn	6	6
(Austria) Barbara Haas	2	2
(United States) Sofia Kenin	3	0
JE	(United States) Amanda Anisimova	6	6

Final
8	(United States) Kristie Ahn	1	6	6
JE	(United States) Amanda Anisimova	6	2	2

=== Top half ===
First round
1	(United States) M Brengle	6	4	2
LL	(United States) N Coopersmith	1	6	6
(Brazil) PC Gonçalves	7	5	6^{4}
(Hungary) F Stollár	5	7	7^{7}
(United States) D Collins	6^{5}	2
(United States) J Elie	7^{7}	6
Q	(United States) A Kratzer	4	6	4
8	(United States) K Ahn	6	4	6
4	(Tunisia) O Jabeur	6	6
Q	(United States) S Marand	4	2
(Mexico) R Zarazúa	3	6^{6}
(Austria) B Haas	6	7^{8}
PR	(Ukraine) A Kalinina	6	6
(Israel) D Khazaniuk	2	2
(Portugal) M Larcher de Brito	6	2	6
5	(Bulgaria) E Kostova	2	6	4

Second round
LL	(United States) N Coopersmith	1	0^{r}
(Hungary) F Stollár	6	0
(United States) J Elie	2	2
8	(United States) K Ahn	6	6
4	(Tunisia) O Jabeur	2	0
(Austria) B Haas	6	6
PR	(Ukraine) A Kalinina	6	5	4
(Portugal) M Larcher de Brito	2	7	6

Quarterfinals
(Hungary) F Stollár	3	3
8	(United States) K Ahn	6	6
(Austria) B Haas	2	6	6
(Portugal) M Larcher de Brito	6	0	4

Semifinals
8	(United States) K Ahn	6	6
(Austria) B Haas	2	2

=== Bottom half ===
First round
6	(United States) J Loeb	6	6
WC	(United States) E Halbauer	4	3
PR	(United Kingdom) S Murray	4	6	6^{8}
WC	(United States) UM Arconada	6	2	7^{10}
WC	(United States) C Whoriskey	2	4
(Argentina) C Pella	6	6
(United States) S Kenin	6	6
3	(Germany) T Maria	3	4
7	(Australia) L Cabrera	3	4
JE	(United States) A Anisimova	6	6
(Poland) P Kania	6	6
Q	(Croatia) T Lukas	3	4
Q	(Romania) J Cristian	6	6
(Bulgaria) S Karatantcheva	2	1
WC	(United States) S Chang	5	6	6
2	(United States) T Townsend	7	3	3

Second round
6	(United States) J Loeb	4	5
WC	(United States) UM Arconada	6	7
(Argentina) C Pella	2	1
(United States) S Kenin	6	6
JE	(United States) A Anisimova	6	6
(Poland) P Kania	3	2
Q	(Romania) J Cristian	6	1	1
WC	(United States) S Chang	3	6	6

Quarterfinals
WC	(United States) UM Arconada	4	2
(United States) S Kenin	6	6
JE	(United States) A Anisimova	6	4	6
WC	(United States) S Chang	1	6	2

Semifinals
(United States) S Kenin	3	0
JE	(United States) A Anisimova	6	6
