= Anamika Bhargava =

American tennis player

- Country (sports): United States
- Born: 13 April 1989 (age 37) New York, U.S.
- Height: 1.70 m (5 ft 7 in)
- Plays: Right-handed (two-handed backhand)
- College: Pepperdine University (2007–2011)
- Prize money: $22,009

Singles
- Career record: 45–57
- Career titles: 0
- Highest ranking: No. 608 (15 September 2014)

Doubles
- Career record: 83–58
- Career titles: 9 ITF
- Highest ranking: No. 283 (24 June 2013)

Anamika Bhargava (born 13 April 1989) is an American former professional tennis player.

Bhargava has a career-high WTA doubles ranking of 283, reached on 24 June 2013. In her career, she won nine doubles titles on the ITF Women's Circuit.

Bhargava made her WTA Tour main-draw debut at the 2012 Texas Tennis Open, also in the doubles tournament.

== ITF finals ==
=== Singles: 2 (2 runner-ups) ===
Legend $25,000 tournaments $10,000 tournaments	Finals by surface Hard (0–1) Clay (0–1)

Result	No.	Date	Tournament	Surface	Opponent	Score
Loss	1.	17 October 2011	ITF Montego Bay, Jamaica	Hard	(Slovakia) Zuzana Zlochová	4–6, 3–6
Loss	2.	22 October 2012	ITF Luque, Paraguay	Clay	(Paraguay) Camila Giangreco Campiz	5–7, 4–6

=== Doubles: 15 (9 titles, 6 runner-ups) ===
Legend $25,000 tournaments $15,000 tournaments $10,000 tournaments	Finals by surface Hard (5–6) Clay (4–0)

Result	No.	Date	Tournament	Surface	Partner	Opponents	Score
Win	1.	26 March 2012	ITF Antalya, Turkey	Clay	(United States) Sylvia Krywacz	(Slovakia) Anna Karolína Schmiedlová (Slovakia) Chantal Škamlová	4–6, 6–4, [10–3]
Win	2.	28 May 2012	ITF Hilton Head, United States	Hard	(United States) Sylvia Krywacz	(Slovenia) Jelena Durisic (Japan) Rio Kitagawa	6–1, 6–4
Loss	1.	30 July 2012	ITF Fort Worth, US	Hard	(United States) Elizabeth Ferris	(United States) Macall Harkins (New Zealand) Dianne Hollands	6–7^{(6)}, 4–6
Win	3.	22 October 2012	ITF Luque, Paraguay	Clay	(United States) Sylvia Krywacz	(Argentina) Andrea Benítez (Brazil) Raquel Piltcher	6–4, 6–2
Win	4.	29 October 2012	ITF Asuncion, Paraguay	Clay	(United States) Sylvia Krywacz	(Argentina) Andrea Benítez (Brazil) Raquel Piltcher	6–1, 6–4
Loss	2.	5 November 2012	ITF Asuncion	Hard	(United States) Sylvia Krywacz	(Bolivia) María Fernanda Álvarez Terán (South Africa) Chanel Simmonds	6–4, 3–6, [5–10]
Loss	3.	17 February 2013	Rancho Santa Fe Open, United States	Hard	(United States) Macall Harkins	(United States) Allie Will (United States) Asia Muhammad	1–6, 4–6
Win	5.	11 March 2013	ITF Antalya, Turkey	Clay	(United States) Nicole Melichar	(Ukraine) Alona Fomina (Georgia (country)) Sofia Shapatava	6–7^{(7)}, 6–3, [10–7]
Loss	4.	18 March 2013	ITF Antalya	Hard	(United States) Nicole Melichar	(Georgia (country)) Oksana Kalashnikova (Kyrgyzstan) Ksenia Palkina	1–6, 3–6
Loss	5.	3 June 2013	ITF Las Cruces, US	Hard	(United States) Mayo Hibi	(Bolivia) María Fernanda Álvarez Terán (United States) Keri Wong	2–6, 2–6
Win	6.	27 October 2013	ITF Florence, US	Hard	(United States) Madison Brengle	(United States) Kristi Boxx (New Zealand) Abigail Guthrie	7–5, 7–5
Win	7.	15 November 2013	ITF Mumbai, India	Hard	(United Kingdom) Emily Webley-Smith	(Chinese Taipei) Hsu Ching-wen (United Kingdom) Eden Silva	6–4, 7–5
Win	8.	16 June 2014	ITF Quintana Roo, Mexico	Hard	(United States) Allie Will	(Mexico) Victoria Rodríguez (Mexico) Marcela Zacarías	6–2, 6–2
Win	9.	23 June 2014	ITF Quintana Roo	Hard	(United States) Allie Will	(Mexico) Victoria Rodríguez (Mexico) Marcela Zacarías	6–0, 6–4
Loss	6.	24 August 2014	ITF Winnipeg, Canada	Hard	(Brazil) Maria Fernanda Alves	(Canada) Rosie Johanson (Canada) Charlotte Petrick	3–6, 3–6
