= 2013 Citi Open =

- Date: July 27 – August 4
- Edition: 45th (men) / 3rd (women)
- Category: ATP World Tour 500 (men); WTA International (women)
- Surface: Hard
- Location: Washington, D.C., United States
- Venue: William H.G. FitzGerald Tennis Center

Champions

Men's singles
- (Argentina) Juan Martín del Potro

Women's singles
- (Slovakia) Magdaléna Rybáriková

Men's doubles
- (France) Julien Benneteau / (Serbia) Nenad Zimonjić

Women's doubles
- (Japan) Shuko Aoyama / (Russia) Vera Dushevina
- Washington Open

The 2013 Citi Open (known as such for sponsorship reasons) was a tennis tournament played on outdoor hard courts. It was the 45th edition (for the men) and the 3rd edition (for the women) of the event known that year as the Citi Open (previously known on the men's tour as the Legg Mason Tennis Classic), and was part of the ATP World Tour 500 series of the 2013 ATP World Tour, and of the WTA International tournaments of the 2013 WTA Tour. It took place at the William H.G. FitzGerald Tennis Center in Washington, D.C., United States, from July 27 to August 4, 2013. Juan Martín del Potro and Magdaléna Rybáriková won the singles titles.

== Finals ==
=== Men's singles ===
(Argentina) Juan Martín del Potro defeated (United States) John Isner, 3–6, 6–1, 6–2

=== Women's singles ===
(Slovakia) Magdaléna Rybáriková defeated (Germany) Andrea Petkovic, 6–4, 7–6^{(7–2)}

=== Men's doubles ===
(France) Julien Benneteau / (Serbia) Nenad Zimonjić defeated (United States) Mardy Fish / (Czech Republic) Radek Štěpánek, 7–6^{(7–5)}, 7–5

=== Women's doubles ===
(Japan) Shuko Aoyama / (Russia) Vera Dushevina defeated (Canada) Eugenie Bouchard / (United States) Taylor Townsend, 6–3, 6–3

== ATP singles main-draw entrants ==
=== Seeds ===
Country	Player	Ranking	Seeds*
ARG	Juan Martín del Potro	7	1
JPN	Kei Nishikori	11	2
GER	Tommy Haas	12	3
CAN	Milos Raonic	13	4
FRA	Gilles Simon	16	5
USA	Sam Querrey	20	6
RSA	Kevin Anderson	21	7
USA	John Isner	22	8
UKR	Alexandr Dolgopolov	25	9
~~ESP~~	~~Feliciano López~~	~~29~~	~~10~~
BUL	Grigor Dimitrov	31	11
FRA	Julien Benneteau	35	12
CRO	Ivan Dodig	36	13
AUS	Bernard Tomic	41	14
RUS	Nikolay Davydenko	42	15
CYP	Marcos Baghdatis	44	16
FRA	Michaël Llodra	46	17

- ^{1} Rankings are as of July 22, 2013

=== Other entrants ===
The following players received wild cards into the main singles draw:

- (Argentina) Juan Martín del Potro
- (Australia) James Duckworth
- (United States) Steve Johnson
- (United States) Denis Kudla
- (United States) Jack Sock

The following players received entry from the singles qualifying draw:

- (India) Somdev Devvarman
- (Australia) Matthew Ebden
- (Australia) Samuel Groth
- (United States) Alex Kuznetsov
- (United States) Tim Smyczek
- (Japan) Yūichi Sugita

The following players received entry as lucky losers:

- (Canada) Jesse Levine
- (United States) Rhyne Williams

=== Withdrawals ===
Before the tournament

- (Spain) Feliciano López (fatigue)
- (France) Gaël Monfils
- (France) Jo-Wilfried Tsonga

== ATP doubles main-draw entrants ==
=== Seeds ===
Country	Player	Country	Player	Rank^{1}	Seed
AUT	Alexander Peya	BRA	Bruno Soares	14	1
PAK	Aisam-ul-Haq Qureshi	NED	Jean-Julien Rojer	25	2
SWE	Robert Lindstedt	CAN	Daniel Nestor	29	3
CRO	Ivan Dodig	BRA	Marcelo Melo	36	4

- ^{1} Rankings are as of July 22, 2013

=== Other entrants ===
The following pairs received wildcards into the doubles main draw:

- (United States) James Blake / (United States) Eric Butorac
- (United States) Steve Johnson / (United States) Sam Querrey

=== Withdrawals ===
Before the tournament

- (United States) Bob Bryan (shoulder injury)

== WTA singles main-draw entrants ==
=== Seeds ===
Country	Player	Ranking	Seeds*
GER	Angelique Kerber	9	1
USA	Sloane Stephens	15	2
RUS	Ekaterina Makarova	26	3
FRA	Alizé Cornet	30	4
ROU	Sorana Cîrstea	32	5
GER	Mona Barthel	33	6
SVK	Magdaléna Rybáriková	39	7
USA	Madison Keys	44	8

- ^{1} Rankings are as of July 22, 2013

=== Other entrants ===
The following players received wild cards into the main singles draw:

- (United States) Beatrice Capra
- (Germany) Angelique Kerber
- (United States) Taylor Townsend

The following players received entry from the singles qualifying draw:

- (United States) Irina Falconi
- (Portugal) Michelle Larcher de Brito
- (United States) Alexandra Mueller
- (United States) Jessica Pegula

=== Withdrawals ===
Before the tournament

- (United States) Lauren Davis
- (Italy) Camila Giorgi
- (Romania) Simona Halep (back injury)
- (Estonia) Kaia Kanepi
- (Sweden) Johanna Larsson
- (Spain) Anabel Medina Garrigues
- (Switzerland) Romina Oprandi
- (Russia) Nadia Petrova

=== Retirements ===
- (Romania) Monica Niculescu (left wrist injury)
- (Russia) Olga Puchkova (defaulted)
- (Ukraine) Lesia Tsurenko (right thigh injury)

== WTA doubles main-draw entrants ==
=== Seeds ===
Country	Player	Country	Player	Rank^{1}	Seed
JPN	Shuko Aoyama	RUS	Vera Dushevina	81	1
USA	Irina Falconi	CZE	Eva Hrdinová	154	2
GEO	Anna Tatishvili	GBR	Heather Watson	195	3
COL	Catalina Castaño	USA	Jessica Pegula	209	4

- ^{1} Rankings are as of July 22, 2013
