= Kristie Ahn =

American tennis player (born 1992)

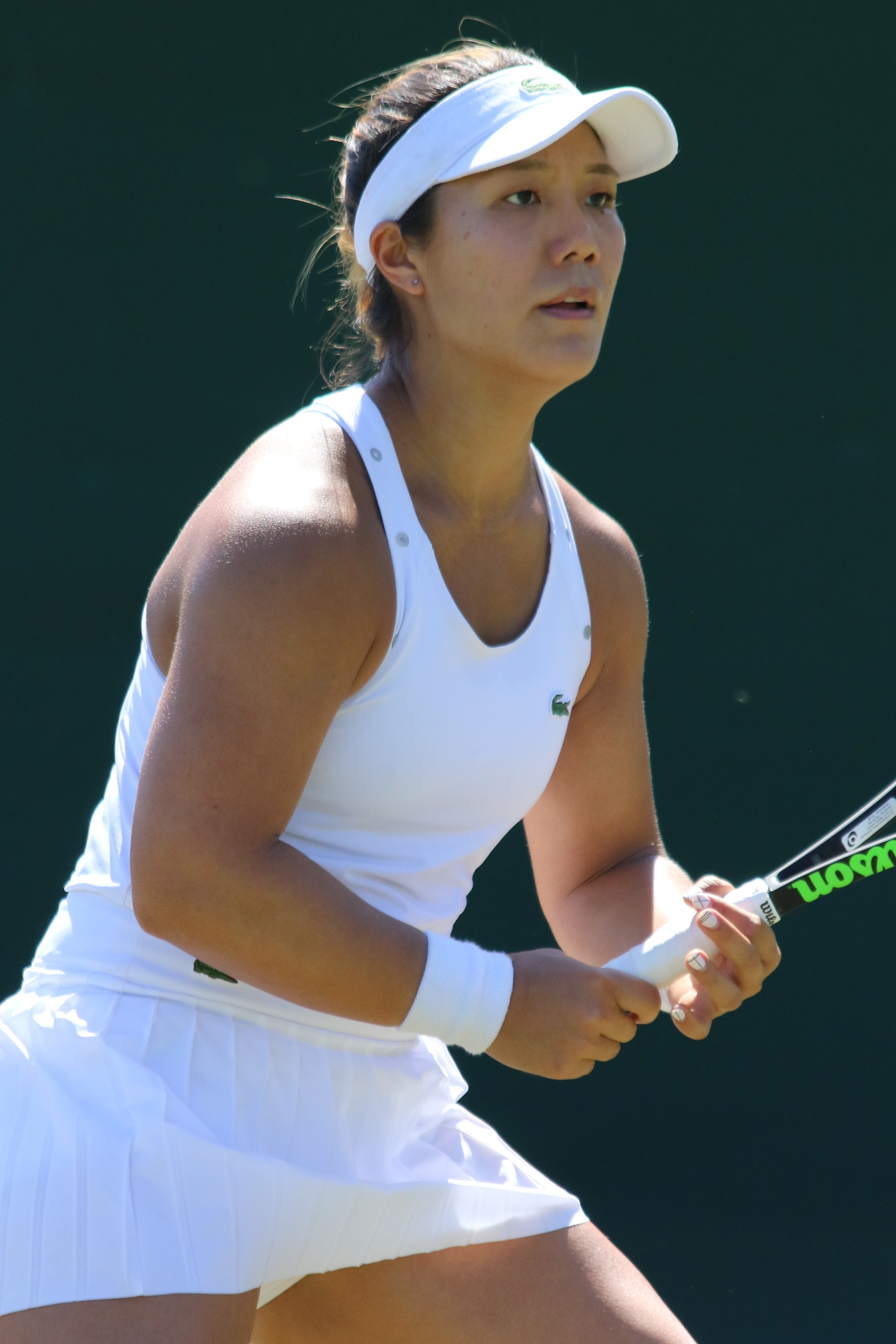
- Ahn at the 2018 Wimbledon Championships
- Full name: Kristie Hyerim Ahn
- Country (sports): United States
- Residence: Upper Saddle River, New Jersey, U.S.
- Born: June 15, 1992 (age 34) Flushing, New York, U.S.
- Height: 5 ft 5 in (1.65 m)
- Turned pro: May 2008
- Retired: March 2022
- Plays: Right-handed (two-handed backhand)
- Prize money: US$ 1,236,893

Singles
- Career record: 236–182
- Career titles: 7 ITF
- Highest ranking: No. 87 (September 30, 2019)

Grand Slam singles results
- Australian Open: 1R (2018, 2020)
- French Open: 1R (2020)
- Wimbledon: 2R (2021)
- US Open: 4R (2019)

Doubles
- Career record: 57–57
- Career titles: 2 ITF
- Highest ranking: No. 199 (April 24, 2017)

Grand Slam doubles results
- Wimbledon: Q1 (2017)
- US Open: 1R (2009, 2017)

Korean name
- Hangul: 안혜림
- Hanja: 安蕙林
- Revised Romanization: An Hye-rim
- McCune–Reischauer: An Hyerim

Kristie Hyerim Ahn (born June 15, 1992) is an American former professional tennis player. She won seven singles and two doubles titles on the ITF Circuit and had a career-high singles ranking of world No. 87, achieved on 30 September 2019.

Ahn made her Grand Slam debut aged 16 at the 2008 US Open. She had her best result at a major 11 years later at the 2019 US Open where she reached the fourth round.

== Early and personal life ==
Ahn was born in Flushing Hospital, to South Korean immigrant parents Fay and Don Ahn, later living in Englewood Cliffs, New Jersey. She graduated from Stanford University in 2014 with a degree in Science, Technology and Society.

== Career ==
Aged 16 and ranked 758 in the world, Ahn made her major debut at the 2008 US Open having been given a wildcard entry into the qualifying tournament and winning three matches to reach the main-draw, where she lost to sixth seed Dinara Safina.

Representing the Stanford Cardinal women's tennis team, she was 2011 Pac-10 Championships singles champion and would also be ITA National Rookie of the Year and a three-time All-American during her college career spanning from 2010 to 2014.

Ahn won her biggest ITF Circuit titles in 2017, taking two $80,000 level titles – one each in singles and doubles. In April she teamed up with Quinn Gleason to win the doubles at Indian Harbour Beach, defeating Laura Pigossi and Renata Zarazúa in the final. Ahn then claimed the singles title at the Tyler Pro Challenge in November, overcoming Danielle Collins in the championship match. Sandwiched in between these two title triumphs, Ahn also reached her first WTA Tour quarterfinal as a qualifier at the Nottingham Open in June, a run which included a win over eighth seed Naomi Osaka, before ultimately ending in defeat to Magdaléna Rybáriková.

Having won the United States Tennis Association (USTA) wildcard challenge, she made her maiden main-draw appearance at the Australian Open in January 2018, losing to Barbora Strýcová in the first round.

Ahn qualified for the 2019 Wimbledon Championships, making her main-draw debut at the grass-court major in a first round defeat to 12th seed Anastasija Sevastova.

She reached her second WTA quarterfinal at the 2019 Silicon Valley Classic, qualifying for the main-draw and then overcoming Ajla Tomljanović and third seed Elise Mertens, before losing to fifth seed Donna Vekić.

Eleven years after her only previous appearance in the main-draw at Flushing Meadows, Ahn won the USTA wildcard challenge to gain a place at the 2019 US Open. She proceeded to have her career-best run at a major, recording straight sets wins over 2004 champion Svetlana Kuznetsova, qualifier Anna Kalinskaya and 2017 French Open winner Jeļena Ostapenko, to make it through to the fourth round, at which point she lost to 25th seed Elise Mertens.

Ranked inside the top-100 for the first time at world No. 93, Ahn was awarded a wildcard entry into the 2019 Korea Open and went on to reach the quarterfinals by double bageling Timea Bacsinszky and defeating qualifier Ana Bogdan in a third set tiebreak, before losing in the last eight to second seed Ekaterina Alexandrova.

Ahn gained direct entry into the 2020 French Open, completing appearances at the full-set of majors, although she lost in the first round to three-time champion and sixth seed Serena Williams in straight sets.

At the 2021 Wimbledon Championships, she lost in the final round of qualifying but entered the main-draw as a lucky loser and defeated Heather Watson, before bowing out against Sloane Stephens in the second round.

Ahn announced her retirement from professional tennis in March 2022 at the age of 29.

== Singles performance timeline ==
Key
W	F	SF	QF	#R	RR	Q#	P#	DNQ	A	Z#	PO	G	S	B	NMS	NTI	P	NH

(W) winner; (F) finalist; (SF) semifinalist; (QF) quarterfinalist; (#R) rounds 4, 3, 2, 1; (RR) round-robin stage; (Q#) qualification round; (P#) preliminary round; (DNQ) did not qualify; (A) absent; (Z#) Davis/Fed Cup Zonal Group (with number indication) or (PO) play-off; (G) gold, (S) silver or (B) bronze Olympic/Paralympic medal; (NMS) not a Masters tournament; (NTI) not a Tier I tournament; (P) postponed; (NH) not held; (SR) strike rate (events won / competed); (W–L) win–loss record.
To avoid confusion and double counting, these charts are updated at the conclusion of a tournament or when the player's participation has ended.

Only main-draw results in WTA Tour, Grand Slam tournaments, Fed Cup/Billie Jean King Cup and Olympic Games are included in win–loss records.

Tournament	2008	2009	...	2016	2017	2018	2019	2020	2021	SR	W–L	Win %
Grand Slam tournaments
Australian Open	A	A		Q1	A	1R	Q2	1R	A	0 / 2	0–2	0%
French Open	A	A		Q2	Q2	Q1	Q1	1R	Q1	0 / 1	0–1	0%
Wimbledon	A	A		A	Q3	Q2	1R	NH	2R	0 / 2	1–2	33%
US Open	1R	Q2		Q3	Q2	Q2	4R	1R	Q1	0 / 3	3–3	50%
Win–loss	0–1	0–0		0–0	0–0	0–1	3–2	0–3	1–1	0 / 8	4–8	33%
WTA 1000
Indian Wells Open	A	A		A	A	Q2	A	NH	A	0 / 0	0–0	–
Miami Open	A	A		A	A	Q1	A	NH	Q2	0 / 0	0–0	–
Canadian Open	A	A		A	A	A	A	NH	Q2	0 / 0	0–0	–
Cincinnati Open	NT1	A		A	A	A	Q1	Q2	Q1	0 / 0	0–0	–
Pan Pacific / Wuhan Open (Note: In 2014, the Pan Pacific Open was downgraded to a Premier event and replaced by the Wuhan Open. The Premier 5 tournaments were reclassified as WTA 1000 tournaments in 2021.)	A	A		A	Q1	A	A	NH		0 / 0	0–0	–
China Open	NT1	A		A	Q1	A	Q1	NH		0 / 0	0–0	–
Career statistics
Tournaments	1	0		0	5	6	7	5	4	Career total: 29		
Titles	0	0		0	0	0	0	0	0	Career total: 0		
Finals	0	0		0	0	0	0	0	0	Career total: 0		
Overall win–loss	0–1	0–0		0–0	4–5	1–6	9–7	0–5	2–4	0 / 29	16–29	36%
Year-end ranking (Note: 2010: WTA ranking–507, 2011: WTA ranking–N/A, 2012: WTA ranking–704, 2013: WTA ranking–719, 2014: WTA ranking–650, 2015: WTA ranking–208.)	443	345		220	106	196	91	108	252	$1,069,413		

== ITF Circuit finals ==
=== Singles: 13 (7 titles, 6 runner-ups) ===
Legend $80,000 tournaments $50/60,000 tournaments $25,000 tournaments $10,000 tournaments	Finals by surface Hard (6–5) Clay (1–1)

Result	W–L	Date	Tournament	Tier	Surface	Opponent	Score
Win	1–0	May 2008	ITF Landisville, United States	10,000	Hard	(Canada) Rebecca Marino	6–3, 2–6, 6–3
Win	2–0	Jun 2008	ITF Houston, United States	10,000	Hard (i)	(Chinese Taipei) Chan Chin-wei	7–6^{(7)}, 0–6, 7–6^{(2)}
Win	3–0	Mar 2009	ITF Hammond, United States	25,000	Hard	(Australia) Sophie Ferguson	0–6, 6–4, 6–4
Loss	3–1	May 2010	Carson Challenger, United States	50,000	Hard	(United States) CoCo Vandeweghe	1–6, 3–6
Win	4–1	May 2015	ITF Changwon, South Korea	25,000	Hard	(South Korea) Lee Ye-ra	6–3, 3–2 ret.
Win	5–1	Aug 2015	Winnipeg Challenger, Canada	25,000	Hard	(Canada) Sharon Fichman	6–2, 7–5
Loss	5–2	Apr 2016	ITF Changwon, South Korea	25,000	Hard	(Sweden) Susanne Celik	2–6, 0–6
Loss	5–3	Nov 2016	Scottsdale Challenge, United States	50,000	Hard	(Brazil) Beatriz Haddad Maia	6–7^{(4)}, 6–7^{(2)}
Win	6–3	Apr 2017	Dothan Pro Classic, United States	60,000	Clay	(United States) Amanda Anisimova	1–6, 6–2, 6–2
Loss	6–4	May 2017	Open Saint-Gaudens, France	60,000	Clay	(Netherlands) Richèl Hogenkamp	2–6, 4–6
Win	7–4	Nov 2017	Tyler Pro Challenge, United States	80,000	Hard	(United States) Danielle Collins	6–4, 6–4
Loss	7–5	Aug 2018	Landisville Challenge, United States	60,000	Hard	(United States) Madison Brengle	4–6, 0–1 ret.
Loss	7–6	Feb 2019	Rancho Santa Fe Open, United States	W25	Hard	(United States) Nicole Gibbs	3–6, 3–6

=== Doubles: 6 (2 titles, 4 runner-ups) ===
Legend $80,000 tournaments $50/60,000 tournaments $25,000 tournaments	Finals by surface Hard (0–2) Clay (2–1) Carpet (0–1)

Result	W–L	Date	Tournament	Tier	Surface	Partner	Opponents	Score
Win	1–0	May 2010	Raleigh Challenger, United States	50,000	Clay	(United States) Nicole Gibbs	(United States) Alexandra Mueller (United States) Ahsha Rolle	6–3, 6–2
Loss	1–1	Aug 2015	Winnipeg Challenger, Canada	25,000	Hard	(United States) Lorraine Guillermo	(Canada) Sharon Fichman (Serbia) Jovana Jakšić	2–6, 1–6
Loss	1–2	Oct 2015	Toronto Challenger, Canada	50,000	Hard (i)	(Hungary) Fanny Stollár	(Canada) Sharon Fichman (United States) Maria Sanchez	2–6, 7–6^{(6)}, [6–10]
Win	2–2	Apr 2017	ITF Indian Harbour Beach, US	80,000	Clay	(United States) Quinn Gleason	(Brazil) Laura Pigossi (Mexico) Renata Zarazúa	6–3, 6–2
Loss	2–3	Apr 2017	Dothan Pro Classic, US	60,000	Clay	(Australia) Lizette Cabrera	(United States) Emina Bektas (United States) Sanaz Marand	3–6, 6–1, [2–10]
Loss	2–4	May 2019	Fukuoka International, Japan	W60	Carpet	(Australia) Alison Bai	(United Kingdom) Naomi Broady (United Kingdom) Heather Watson	w/o
