= Keri Wong =

American tennis player

- Country (sports): United States
- Born: December 25, 1989 (age 36) Jackson, Mississippi, U.S.
- Height: 5 ft 4 in (1.63 m)
- Prize money: $25,703

Singles
- Career record: 51–56
- Career titles: 0
- Highest ranking: No. 866 (April 24, 2017)

Doubles
- Career record: 101–68
- Career titles: 7 ITF
- Highest ranking: No. 156 (April 21, 2014)

Keri Wong (born December 25, 1989) is an American former professional tennis player.

In her career, she won seven doubles titles on the ITF Women's Circuit. On April 21, 2014, she peaked at No. 156 in the WTA doubles rankings.

Wong made her WTA Tour debut at the Washington Open, partnering María Fernanda Álvarez Terán in doubles. The pair won their first round and quarterfinal matches, only to lose to eventual tournament champions Shuko Aoyama and Vera Dushevina in the semifinals.

== ITF Circuit finals ==
=== Doubles (7–10) ===
Legend $50,000 tournaments $25,000 tournaments $10,000 tournaments	Finals by surface Hard (4–7) Clay (3–3)

Result	No.	Date	Tier	Tournament	Surface	Partner	Opponents	Score
Loss	1.	Jun 2008	10,000	Hilton Head, United States	Hard	(Brazil) Carolina Salge	(United States) Jennifer Elie (United States) Nadja Gilchrist	1–6, 6–0, [5–10]
Loss	2.	Oct 2012	10,000	Gainesville, United States	Clay	(United States) Kristi Boxx	(Bolivia) María Fernanda Álvarez Terán (Russia) Angelina Gabueva	6–7^{(4)}, 7–5, [7–10]
Win	1.	Apr 2013	25,000	Caracas, Venezuela	Hard	(Bolivia) María Fernanda Álvarez Terán	(Hungary) Naomi Totka (Brazil) Karina Venditti	6–1, 6–2
Win	2.	May 2013	10,000	Landisville, United States	Hard	(Bolivia) María Fernanda Álvarez Terán	(United States) Brooke Austin (Australia) Brooke Rischbieth	2–6, 6–4, [10–5]
Loss	3.	May 2013	25,000	El Paso, United States	Hard	(Oman) Fatma Al-Nabhani	(Venezuela) Adriana Pérez (Mexico) Marcela Zacarías	3–6, 3–6
Win	3.	Jun 2013	25,000	Las Cruces, United States	Hard	(Bolivia) María Fernanda Álvarez Terán	(United States) Anamika Bhargava (Japan) Mayo Hibi	6–2, 6–2
Loss	4.	Feb 2014	25,000	Rancho Santa Fe, United States	Hard	(United States) Danielle Lao	(United States) Samantha Crawford (China) Xu Yifan	6–3, 2–6, [10–12]
Win	4.	Apr 2014	25,000	Pelham, United States	Clay	(United States) Danielle Lao	(Bulgaria) Dia Evtimova (Belarus) Ilona Kremen	1–6, 6–4, [10–7]
Loss	5.	May 2014	25,000	Raleigh, United States	Clay	(United States) Danielle Lao	(Chinese Taipei) Hsu Chieh-yu (United States) Alexandra Mueller	3–6, 3–6
Loss	6.	Jul 2014	50,000	Lexington Challenger, United States	Hard	(Japan) Shuko Aoyama	(United Kingdom) Jocelyn Rae (United Kingdom) Anna Smith	4–6, 4–6
Win	5.	Sep 2014	10,000	Amelia Island, United States	Clay	(Brazil) Maria Fernanda Alves	(United States) Sophie Chang (United States) Andie Daniell	7–6^{(6)}, 7–6^{(4)}
Win	6.	Sep 2014	10,000	Hilton Head, United States	Clay	(Brazil) Maria Fernanda Alves	(United States) Emily Harman (United States) Madeleine Kobelt	6–1, 7–6^{(5)}
Loss	7.	Oct 2014	25,000	Florence, United States	Hard	(United States) Danielle Lao	(United States) Jamie Loeb (United States) Sanaz Marand	3–6, 6–7^{(5)}
Win	7.	Oct 2015	25,000	Florence, United States	Hard	(Bosnia and Herzegovina) Ema Burgić Bucko	(Latvia) Diāna Marcinkēviča (United States) Chiara Scholl	7–6^{(6)}, 6–1
Loss	8.	Apr 2016	50,000	Dothan, United States	Clay	(United States) Caitlin Whoriskey	(United States) Asia Muhammad (United States) Taylor Townsend	0–6, 1–6
Loss	9.	Jul 2016	10,000	Evansville, United States	Hard	(United States) Brynn Boren	(United States) Sophie Chang (United States) Alexandra Mueller	1–6, 4–6
Loss	10.	Oct 2016	50,000	Macon, United States	Hard	(United States) Sabrina Santamaria	(Netherlands) Michaëlla Krajicek (United States) Taylor Townsend	6–3, 2–6, [6–10]
