= Hardee's Pro Classic =

- 2019 Hardee's Pro Classic

ITF Women's Tour
- Event name: Dothan
- Location: Dothan, Alabama, United States
- Venue: Westgate Tennis Center
- Category: ITF $80,000
- Surface: Clay
- Prize money: $80,000
- Website: www.dothanprotennis.org

The Hardee's Pro Classic (formerly known as the Movie Gallery Pro Tennis Classic and the Dothan Pro Tennis Classic) is a tennis tournament held on outdoor clay courts at the Westgate Tennis Center in Dothan, Alabama. It has been held since 2001 and is part of the ITF Women's Circuit as a $80,000 event. In the past it has been a $25,000 event (2001) and a $75,000 event (2002–2009).

== Past finals ==
=== Singles ===
| Year | Champion | Runner-up | Score |
|---|---|---|---|
| 2020 | Tournament cancelled due to the COVID-19 pandemic | | |
| 2019 | (Slovakia) Kristína Kučová | (United States) Lauren Davis | 3–6, 7–6^{(11–9)}, 6–2 |
| 2018 | (United States) Taylor Townsend | (Colombia) Mariana Duque Mariño | 6–2, 2–6, 6–1 |
| 2017 | (United States) Kristie Ahn | (United States) Amanda Anisimova | 1–6, 6–2, 6–2 |
| 2016 | (Sweden) Rebecca Peterson | (United States) Taylor Townsend | 6–4, 6–2 |
| 2015 | (United States) Louisa Chirico | (United States) Katerina Stewart | 7–6^{(7–1)}, 3–6, 7–6^{(7–1)} |
| 2014 | (United States) Grace Min | (United States) Victoria Duval | 6–3, 6–1 |
| 2013 | (Croatia) Ajla Tomljanović | (China) Zhang Shuai | 2–6, 6–4, 6–3 |
| 2012 | (Italy) Camila Giorgi | (Romania) Edina Gallovits-Hall | 6–2, 4–6, 6–4 |
| 2011 | (Hungary) Melinda Czink | (France) Stéphanie Foretz Gacon | 6–2, 6–3 |
| 2010 | (Romania) Edina Gallovits | (Belarus) Anastasiya Yakimova | 6–1, 6–4 |
| 2009 | (United States) Shenay Perry | (United States) Carly Gullickson | 6–2, 6–2 |
| 2008 | (United States) Bethanie Mattek | (United States) Varvara Lepchenko | 6–2 7–6^{(7–3)} |
| 2007 | (Chinese Taipei) Chan Yung-jan | (Russia) Alla Kudryavtseva | 6–4, 6–2 |
| 2006 | (Ukraine) Yuliana Fedak | (Uzbekistan) Varvara Lepchenko | 4–6, 6–4, 6–2 |
| 2005 | (Venezuela) Milagros Sequera | (Uzbekistan) Varvara Lepchenko | 2–6, 6–2, 6–4 |
| 2004 | (China) Peng Shuai | (Russia) Evgenia Linetskaya | 6–2, 6–1 |
| 2003 | (Japan) Akiko Morigami | (Venezuela) Milagros Sequera | 6–3, 6–4 |
| 2002 | (Venezuela) Milagros Sequera | (South Africa) Liezel Huber | 7–6^{(9–7)}, 4–6, 6–1 |
| 2001 | (Kazakhstan) Irina Selyutina | (United States) Ashley Harkleroad | 6–4, 6–2 |

=== Doubles ===
| Year | Champions | Runners-up | Score |
|---|---|---|---|
| 2020 | Tournament cancelled due to the COVID-19 pandemic | | |
| 2019 | (United States) Usue Maitane Arconada (United States) Caroline Dolehide | (Australia) Destanee Aiava (Australia) Astra Sharma | 7–6^{(7–5)}, 6–4 |
| 2018 | (Chile) Alexa Guarachi (New Zealand) Erin Routliffe | (United States) Sofia Kenin (United States) Jamie Loeb | 6–4, 2–6, [11–9] |
| 2017 | (United States) Emina Bektas (United States) Sanaz Marand | (United States) Kristie Ahn (Australia) Lizette Cabrera | 6–3, 1–6, [10–2] |
| 2016 | (United States) Asia Muhammad (United States) Taylor Townsend | (United States) Caitlin Whoriskey (United States) Keri Wong | 6–0, 6–1 |
| 2015 | (United Kingdom) Johanna Konta (United States) Maria Sanchez | (Brazil) Paula Cristina Gonçalves (Czech Republic) Petra Krejsová | 6–3, 6–4 |
| 2014 | (Estonia) Anett Kontaveit (Belarus) Ilona Kremen | (United States) Shelby Rogers (Australia) Olivia Rogowska | 6–1, 5–7, [10–5] |
| 2013 | (United States) Julia Cohen (Germany) Tatjana Maria | (United States) Irina Falconi (United States) Maria Sanchez | 6–4, 4–6, [11–9] |
| 2012 | (Canada) Eugenie Bouchard (United States) Jessica Pegula | (Canada) Sharon Fichman (Canada) Marie-Ève Pelletier | 6–4, 4–6, [10–5] |
| 2011 | (Russia) Valeria Solovieva (Slovakia) Lenka Wienerová | (Canada) Heidi El Tabakh (United States) Alison Riske | 6–3, 6–4 |
| 2010 | (Russia) Alina Jidkova (Belarus) Anastasiya Yakimova | (Argentina) María Irigoyen (Serbia) Teodora Mirčić | 6–4, 6–2 |
| 2009 | (United States) Julie Ditty (United States) Carly Gullickson | (Russia) Ekaterina Bychkova (Russia) Alexandra Panova | 2–6, 6–1, [10–6] |
| 2008 | (Ukraine) Tetiana Luzhanska (Czech Republic) Michaela Paštiková | (Brazil) Maria Fernanda Alves (Canada) Stéphanie Dubois | 6–1 6–3 |
| 2007 | (Chinese Taipei) Chan Yung-jan (Chinese Taipei) Chuang Chia-jung | (Germany) Angelika Bachmann (Germany) Vanessa Henke | 6–2, 6–3 |
| 2006 | (Australia) Monique Adamczak (Argentina) Soledad Esperón | (Romania) Edina Gallovits (Uzbekistan) Varvara Lepchenko | 6–4, 3–6, 6–4 |
| 2005 | (United States) Carly Gullickson (Russia) Galina Voskoboeva | (United States) Julie Ditty (Czech Republic) Vladimíra Uhlířová | 4–6, 6–1, 6–2 |
| 2004 | (Australia) Lisa McShea (Venezuela) Milagros Sequera | (China) Peng Shuai (China) Xie Yanze | 6–7^{(6–8)}, 6–4, 6–2 |
| 2003 | (Venezuela) Milagros Sequera (Australia) Christina Wheeler | (United States) Julie Ditty (Uzbekistan) Varvara Lepchenko | 5–7, 6–1, 6–2 |
| 2002 | (Japan) Rika Fujiwara (Croatia) Maja Palaveršić | (United States) Samantha Reeves (South Africa) Jessica Steck | 6–3, 6–0 |
| 2001 | (United States) Marissa Irvin (Chinese Taipei) Janet Lee | (Russia) Alina Jidkova (Slovakia) Gabriela Voleková | 6–0, 6–2 |
