= Julia Cohen =

American tennis player (born 1989)

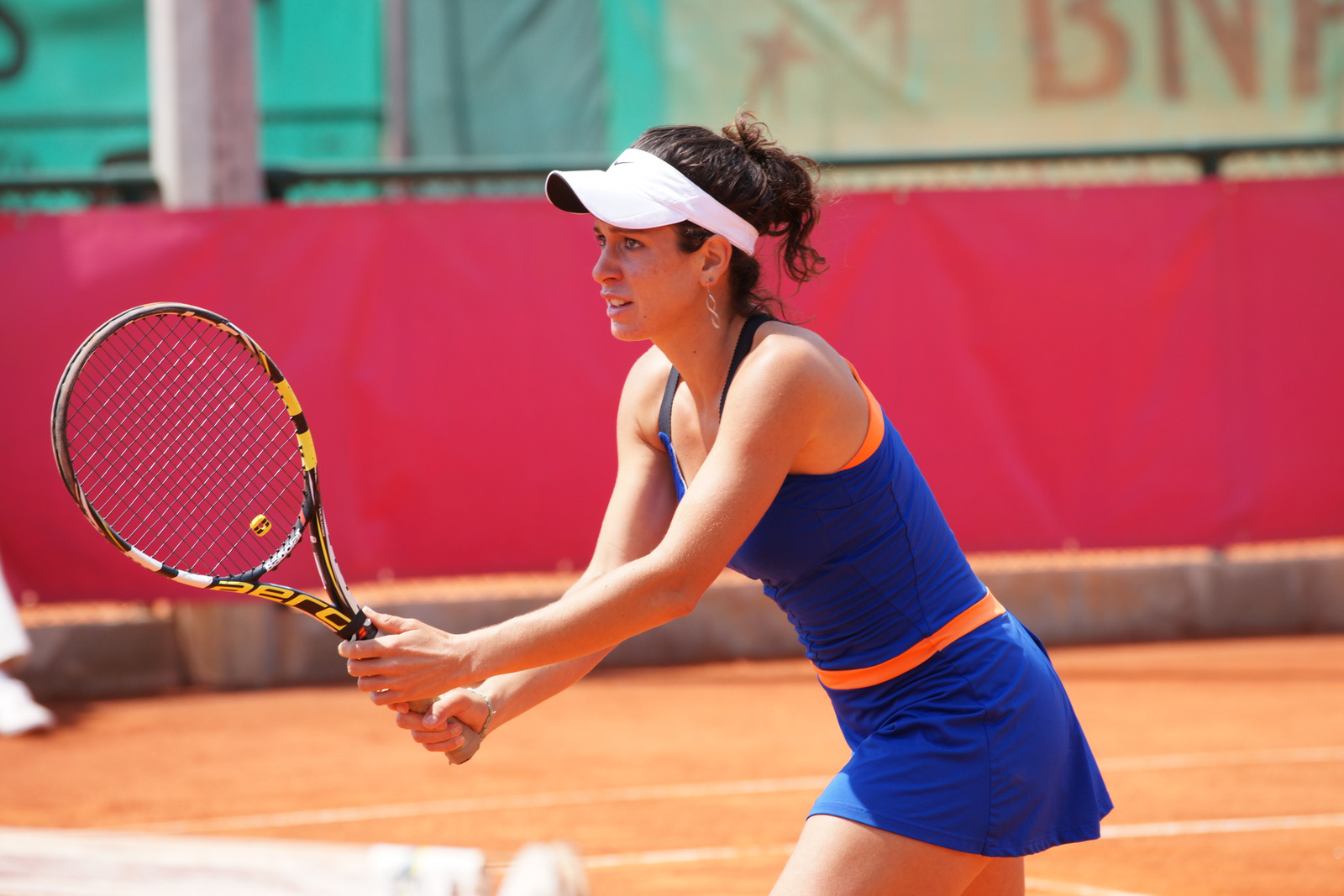
- Cohen at the 2013 Open de Cagnes-sur-Mer
- Country (sports): United States
- Residence: Philadelphia, Pennsylvania, U.S.
- Born: March 23, 1989 (age 37) Philadelphia, Pennsylvania, U.S.
- Height: 1.70 m (5 ft 7 in)
- Turned pro: 2003
- Plays: Right (two-handed backhand)
- College: University of Florida; University of Miami
- Prize money: $360,376

Singles
- Career record: 268–284
- Career titles: 5 ITF
- Highest ranking: No. 97 (July 30, 2012)

Grand Slam singles results
- Australian Open: Q1 (2011)
- French Open: Q2 (2011)
- Wimbledon: Q1 (2011)
- US Open: 1R (2012)

Doubles
- Career record: 99–148
- Career titles: 5 ITF
- Highest ranking: No. 121 (May 13, 2013)

Julia Cohen (born March 23, 1989) is an American former professional tennis player. In 2001, she won the USTA National Spring Championships 12-Under Division Championship. In her career, Cohen won five singles and five doubles titles on the ITF Women's Circuit. On July 30, 2012, she reached her best singles ranking of world No. 97. On May 13, 2013, she peaked at No. 121 in the doubles rankings.

She played collegiate tennis for the Miami Hurricanes at the University of Miami in Coral Gables, Florida.

== Early life and education ==
Cohen was born in Philadelphia, Pennsylvania, on March 23, 1989. and started tennis at the age of three. Her father, Dr. Richard Cohen, played tennis for the Penn Quakers at the University of Pennsylvania and then played professionally for two years. Her brother Josh was an All-American tennis player at the University of Miami who later was named head coach of the Philadelphia Freedoms, a World Team Tennis team.

At the age of six, she was ranked No. 1 in 18-and-under doubles in the USTA Middle States region, which includes Pennsylvania, New Jersey, and Delaware. In 1997, at the age of eight, she became the youngest player to win an adult match in a Middle States Tennis Association tournament. She was then the US champion in the 9-and-under division.

In 2001, she won the USTA National Spring Championships 12-Under Division Championship. In 2006, she was the top-ranked American girls tennis player. That same year, she and partner Kimberly Couts reached the quarterfinals in doubles at the Wimbledon Championships.

When she was 15 years old, she was No. 6 in the junior world rankings. On 11 June 2007, she was ranked No. 4.

=== Collegiate tennis career ===
In her first year of college tennis, playing number-one singles for the University of Florida Gators, she was SEC Rookie of the Year and Intercollegiate Tennis Association (ITA) Rookie of the Year. She transferred to the University of Miami and finished the year ranked fifth in the U.S. in singles, and was named All-ACC.

Cohen earned her Bachelor's degree in sports administration summa cum laude from California University of Pennsylvania in 2012 and a Master's degree in sport psychology in 2013.

== Professional career ==
She was coached by her brother's friend, Conor Taylor, and won five singles and five doubles titles on the ITF Women's Circuit. Cohen played in the 2012 Baku Cup where she made it to her first and only WTA Tour final, before losing in straight sets to No.5 seed Bojana Jovanovski. That year she reached No. 121 in the WTA doubles rankings, and No. 97 in the singles rankings.

She played in World TeamTennis for the Philadelphia Freedoms and the Boston Lobsters.

== Coaching career ==
In 2017, Cohen was hired as an assistant coach for the men's and women's tennis teams at Chestnut Hill College in Philadelphia.

== WTA Tour finals ==
=== Singles: 1 (runner-up) ===
Legend Grand Slam tournaments Premier M & Premier 5 Premier International (0–1)	Finals by surface Hard (0–1) Grass (0–0) Clay (0–0) Carpet (0–0)

Result	No.	Date	Tournament	Surface	Opponent	Score
Loss	1.	July 28, 2012	Baku Cup, Azerbaijan	Hard	(Serbia) Bojana Jovanovski	3–6, 1–6

== ITF finals ==
$50,000 tournaments
$25,000 tournaments
$10,000 tournaments

=== Singles (5–10) ===
Outcome	No.	Date	Location	Surface	Opponent	Score
Winner	1.	September 5, 2004	Mexico City	Hard	(Mexico) María José López Herrera	6–4, 6–4
Runner-up	1.	March 13, 2005	Toluca, Mexico	Hard	(Brazil) Larissa Carvalho	2–6, 2–6
Runner-up	2.	November 25, 2007	Mexico City	Hard	(Argentina) Clarisa Fernández	1–6, 2–6
Winner	2.	December 13, 2009	Xalapa, Mexico	Hard	(United States) Gira Schofield	5–7, 6–2, 7–5
Runner-up	3.	April 25, 2010	Poza Rica, Mexico	Hard	(United States) Lauren Albanese	4–6, 1–6
Runner-up	4.	July 18, 2010	Bogotá, Colombia	Clay	(Argentina) Paula Ormaechea	5–7, 1–6
Winner	3.	July 25, 2010	Waterloo, Canada	Clay	(Oman) Fatma Al-Nabhani	1–6, 7–5, 7–5
Runner-up	5.	November 21, 2010	Niterói, Brazil	Clay	(Romania) Alexandra Cadanțu	1–6, 6–1, 1–6
Runner-up	6.	December 5, 2010	Rio de Janeiro, Brazil	Clay	(Romania) Alexandra Cadanțu	1–6, 3–6
Runner-up	7.	May 28, 2011	Bangkok, Thailand	Hard	(Indonesia) Ayu-Fani Damayanti	6–3, 2–6, 3–6
Winner	4.	October 8, 2011	Yerevan, Armenia	Clay	(Chile) Andrea Koch Benvenuto	7–6^{(6)}, 6–2
Runner-up	8.	November 28, 2011	Rosario, Argentina	Clay	(South Africa) Chanel Simmonds	3–6, 4–6
Winner	5.	December 10, 2011	Buenos Aires, Argentina	Clay	(Slovakia) Romana Tabak	7–5, 6–3
Runner-up	9.	December 1, 2012	Santiago, Chile	Clay	(Brazil) Paula Cristina Gonçalves	6–0, 3–6, 4–6
Runner-up	10.	April 8, 2013	Poza Rica, Mexico	Hard	(Serbia) Jovana Jakšić	6–2, 3–6, 4–6

=== Doubles (5–5) ===
Outcome	No.	Date	Location	Surface	Partner	Opponents	Score
Winner	1.	September 5, 2009	Celaya, Mexico	Clay	(Brazil) Vivian Segnini	(Ukraine) Anastasia Kharchenko (Brazil) Nathalia Rossi	6–1, 6–4
Winner	2.	April 24, 2010	Poza Rica, Mexico	Hard	(United States) Lauren Albanese	(United States) Macall Harkins (Brazil) Vivian Segnini	6–3, 7–6^{(6)}
Runner-up	1.	June 27, 2011	Middelburg, Netherlands	Clay	(Argentina) Florencia Molinero	(Netherlands) Quirine Lemoine (Ukraine) Maryna Zanevska	3–6, 4–6
Runner-up	2.	July 11, 2011	Bogotá, Colombia	Clay	(Chile) Andrea Koch Benvenuto	(Venezuela) Andrea Gámiz (Venezuela) Adriana Pérez	3–6, 4–6
Winner	3.	November 14, 2011	Asunción, Paraguay	Clay	(Croatia) Tereza Mrdeža	(Argentina) Mailen Auroux (Argentina) María Irigoyen	6–3, 2–6, [10–5]
Runner-up	3.	June 25, 2012	Rome, Italy	Clay	(Ukraine) Valentyna Ivakhnenko	(Canada) Marie-Ève Pelletier (France) Laura Thorpe	0–6, 6–3, [8–10]
Runner-up	4.	October 28, 2012	Brasília, Brazil	Clay	(Switzerland) Timea Bacsinszky	(Romania) Elena Bogdan (Romania) Raluca Olaru	3–6, 6–3, [8–10]
Winner	4.	April 15, 2013	Dothan, United States	Clay	(Germany) Tatjana Maria	(United States) Maria Sanchez (United States) Irina Falconi	6–4, 4–6, [11–9]
Runner-up	5.	June 25, 2013	Kristinehamn, Sweden	Clay	(France) Alizé Lim	(Kazakhstan) Anna Danilina (Russia) Olga Doroshina	5–7, 3–6
Winner	5.	March 17, 2014	Innisbrook, United States	Clay	(Italy) Gioia Barbieri	(United States) Allie Kiick (United States) Sachia Vickery	7–6^{(5)}, 6–0

== See also ==
- List of select Jewish tennis players
