= Sofia Kenin career statistics =

Career finals
Discipline	Type	Won	Lost	Total
Singles	Grand Slam	1	1	2
Singles	WTA Finals	–	–	–
Singles	WTA Elite	–	–	–
Singles	WTA 1000	–	–	–
Singles	WTA 500/250	4	4	8
Singles	Olympics	–	–	–
Singles	Total	5	5	10
Doubles	Grand Slam	–	–	–
Doubles	WTA Finals	–	–	–
Doubles	WTA Elite	–	–	–
Doubles	WTA 1000	2	0	2
Doubles	WTA 500/250	2	1	3
Doubles	Olympics	–	–	–
Doubles	Total	4	1	5

This is a list of career statistics of American tennis player Sofia Kenin since her professional debut in 2013. Kenin has won one Grand Slam singles title at the 2020 Australian Open (she was also a finalist at the 2020 French Open), four singles titles and four doubles titles on the WTA Tour, as well as four ITF singles titles and two ITF doubles titles.

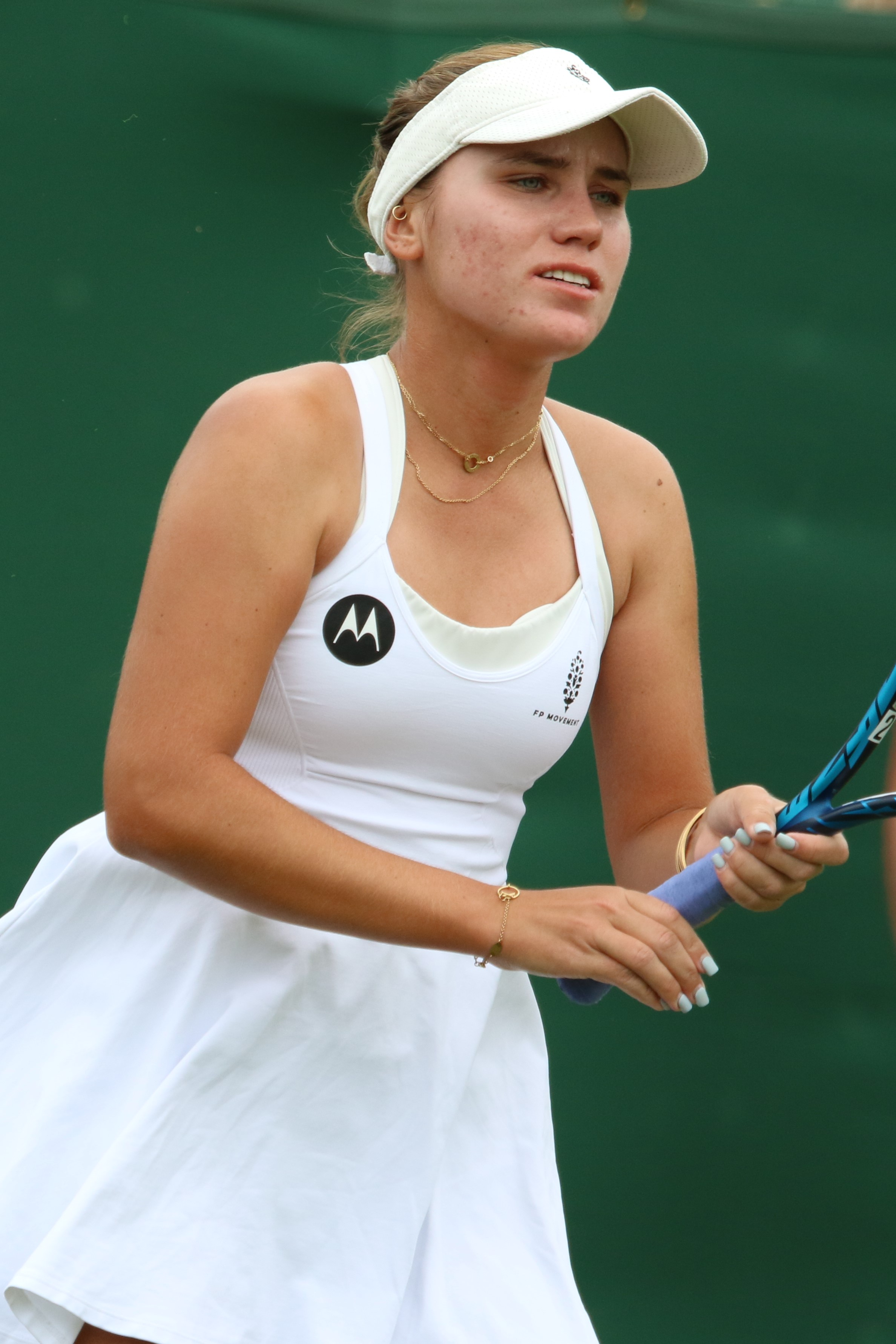
Kenin at the 2023 Wimbledon Championships

== Performance timelines ==
Key
W	F	SF	QF	#R	RR	Q#	DNQ	A	NH

(W) winner; (F) finalist; (SF) semifinalist; (QF) quarterfinalist; (#R) rounds 4, 3, 2, 1; (RR) round-robin stage; (Q#) qualification round; (DNQ) did not qualify; (A) absent; (NH) not held; (SR) strike rate (events won / competed); (W–L) win–loss record.
To avoid confusion and double counting, these charts are updated at the conclusion of a tournament or when the player's participation has ended.

Only main-draw results in WTA Tour, Grand Slam tournaments, Fed Cup/Billie Jean King Cup and Olympic Games are included in win–loss records.

=== Singles ===
Current through the 2026 Italian Open.

Tournament	2015	2016	2017	2018	2019	2020	2021	2022	2023	2024	2025	2026	SR	W–L	Win %
Grand Slam tournaments
Australian Open	A	A	A	1R	2R	W	2R	1R	1R	1R	1R	1R	1 / 9	9–8	53%
French Open	A	A	A	1R	4R (Note: Kenin received a walkover in the second round of 2019 French Open, which does not count as a win.)	F	4R	A	Q1	3R	3R	1R	0 / 7	15–7	68%
Wimbledon	A	A	Q1	2R	2R	NH	2R	A	3R	1R	2R	2R	0 / 7	7–7	50%
US Open	1R	1R	3R	3R	3R	4R	A	1R	2R	2R	1R		0 / 10	11–10	52%
Win–loss	0–1	0–1	2–1	3–4	6–4	16–2	5–3	0–2	3–3	3–4	3–4	1–3	1 / 33	42–32	57%
Year-end championship
WTA Finals	DNQ				RR	NH	DNQ						0 / 1	0–1	0%
WTA Elite Trophy (Note: WTA Tournament of Champions was held from 2009 to 2014, when WTA Elite Trophy replaced it.)	DNQ				RR	Not Held		DNQ	Not Held				0 / 1	1–1	50%
National representation
Summer Olympics	NH	A	Not Held				A	Not Held		A	Not Held		0 / 0	0–0	–
Billie Jean King Cup (Note: Formerly known as Fed Cup until 2020.)	A	A	A	F	QF	SF (Note: Edition is split into the two years due to COVID-19.)		A	RR	A	A		0 / 4	3–5	38%
WTA 1000 tournaments
Qatar Open	NTI	A	NTI	A	NTI	2R	NTI	1R	NTI	1R	3R	1R	0 / 5	2–5	29%
Dubai Championships	A	NTI	A	NTI	3R	NTI	A	NTI	1R	1R	QF	1R	0 / 5	5–5	50%
Indian Wells Open	A	Q1	Q1	2R	2R	NH	A	1R	2R	1R	2R	1R	0 / 7	4–7	36%
Miami Open	A	A	A	3R	2R	NH	3R	A	3R	1R	2R	1R	0 / 7	6–7	46%
Madrid Open	A	A	A	Q1	1R	NH	A	A	1R	1R	3R	2R	0 / 5	3–5	38%
Italian Open	A	A	A	Q1	3R	2R	2R	A	3R	3R	3R	1R	0 / 7	7–7	50%
Canadian Open	A	A	A	Q2	SF	NH	A	1R	A	1R	2R		0 / 4	4–4	50%
Cincinnati Open	A	A	Q2	Q2	SF	2R	A	1R	A	A	1R		0 / 4	4–4	50%
China Open	A	A	A	Q1	3R	Not Held			1R	2R	2R		0 / 4	4–4	50%
Wuhan Open	A	A	A	3R	3R	Not Held				1R	2R		0 / 4	5–4	56%
Guadalajara Open	Not Held							A	SF	Not Tier I			0 / 1	4–1	80%
Win–loss	0–0	0–0	0–0	5–3	17–9	0–3	1–2	0–4	9–7	3–9	12–10	1–6	0 / 53	48–53	48%
Career statistics
	2015	2016	2017	2018	2019	2020	2021	2022	2023	2024	2025	2026	Career		
Tournaments	1	1	3	14	25	10	10	13	17	15	26	11	Career total: 142		
Titles	0	0	0	0	3	2	0	0	0	0	0	0	Career total: 5		
Finals	0	0	0	0	4	3	0	0	0	0	1	0	Career total: 8		
Hard win–loss	0–1	0–1	3–2	13–11	38–16	18–7	7–5	4–13	17–13	8–15	17–18	1–8	4 / 114	126–110	53%
Clay win–loss	0–0	0–0	0–1	0–3	5–5	6–2	3–4	0–0	3–3	5–4	9–5	2–3	0 / 30	33–30	52%
Grass win–loss	0–0	0–0	0–0	4–2	6–2	0–0	1–1	0–0	2–1	0–2	1–3		1 / 12	14–11	56%
Overall win–loss	0–1	0–1	3–3	17–16	49–23	24–9	11–10	4–13	22–17	13–21	27–26	3–11	5 / 156	170–151	53%
Win %	0%	0%	50%	52%	68%	73%	52%	24%	56%	38%	51%	21%	Career total: 53%		
Year-end ranking	620	212	113	52	14	4	12	235	33	86	28		$12,154,244		

=== Doubles ===
Current through the 2026 Wimbledon Championships.

Tournament	2017	2018	2019	2020	2021	2022	2023	2024	2025	2026	SR	W–L	Win %
Grand Slam tournaments
Australian Open	A	A	1R	3R	1R	1R	1R	1R	1R	3R	0 / 6	2–6	25%
French Open	A	A	2R	QF	A	A	A	2R	1R	1R	0 / 3	5–3	63%
Wimbledon	A	2R	1R	NH	1R	A	A	3R	QF (Note: Kenin received a walkover in the third round of 2025 Wimbledon, which does not count as a win.)	2R	0 / 6	3–4	43%
US Open	A	1R	1R	2R	A	1R	1R	3R			0 / 6	3–6	33%
Win–loss	0–0	1–2	1–4	6–3	0–2	0–2	0–2	5–4			0 / 19	13–19	41%
Year-end championships
WTA Elite Trophy	DNQ		RR	NH			DNQ				0 / 1	0–2	0%
WTA 1000 tournaments
Qatar Open	A	A	A	QF	A	A	A	2R			0 / 2	3–2	60%
Dubai Championships	A	A	2R	A	A	A	1R	2R			0 / 3	2–3	40%
Miami Open	A	A	A	NH	1R	A	1R	W			1 / 3	5–3	63%
Indian Wells Open	A	A	A	NH	A	2R	A	1R			0 / 2	1–2	33%
Madrid Open	A	A	A	A	A	A	1R	2R			0 / 2	1–2	33%
Italian Open	A	A	A	1R	A	A	1R	2R			0 / 3	1–3	25%
Canadian Open	A	A	1R	NH	A	QF	A	SF			0 / 3	5–3	63%
Cincinnati Open	A	A	A	2R	A	A	A	1R			0 / 2	1–2	33%
China Open	A	A	W	NH			A	SF			1 / 2	8–1	89%
Wuhan Open	A	A	2R	NH				1R			0 / 2	1–2	33%
Career statistics
Tournaments	2	5	14	8	6	8	8				Career total: 44		
Titles	0	0	2	0	0	0	0				Career total: 2		
Finals	0	0	2	0	0	0	0				Career total: 2		
Overall win–loss	0–2	3–4	12–12	14–8	3–6	5–8	2–8				2 / 51	39–49	44%
Year-end ranking	237	138	39	34	108	150	434						

== Grand Slam tournament finals ==
=== Singles: 2 (1 title, 1 runner-up) ===
Result	Year	Tournament	Surface	Opponent	Score
Win	2020	Australian Open	Hard	(Spain) Garbiñe Muguruza	4–6, 6–2, 6–2
Loss	2020	French Open	Clay	(Poland) Iga Świątek	4–6, 1–6

== WTA 1000 tournaments ==
=== Doubles: 2 (2 titles) ===
Result	Year	Tournament	Surface	Partner	Opponents	Score
Win	2019	China Open	Hard	(United States) Bethanie Mattek-Sands	(Latvia) Jeļena Ostapenko (Ukraine) Dayana Yastremska	6–3, 6–7^{(5–7)}, [10–7]
Win	2024	Miami Open	Hard	(United States) Bethanie Mattek-Sands	(Canada) Gabriela Dabrowski (New Zealand) Erin Routliffe	4-6, 7-6^{(7-5)}, [11-9]

== WTA Tour finals ==
=== Singles: 10 (5 titles, 5 runner-ups) ===
Legend Grand Slam (1–1) WTA 500 (0–3) International (4–1)	Finals by surface Hard (4–3) Clay (0–2) Grass (1–0)	Finals by setting Outdoor (4–5) Indoor (1–0)

Result	W–L	Date	Tournament	Tier	Surface	Opponent	Score
Win	1–0	Jan 2019	Hobart International, Australia	International	Hard	(Slovakia) Anna Karolína Schmiedlová	6–3, 6–0
Loss	1–1	Mar 2019	Abierto Mexicano Telcel, Mexico	International	Hard	(China) Wang Yafan	6–2, 3–6, 5–7
Win	2–1	Jun 2019	Mallorca Open, Spain	International	Grass	(Switzerland) Belinda Bencic	6–7^{(2–7)}, 7–6^{(7–5)}, 6–4
Win	3–1	Sep 2019	Guangzhou Open, China	International	Hard	(Australia) Samantha Stosur	6–7^{(4–7)}, 6–4, 6–2
Win	4–1	Jan 2020	Australian Open, Australia	Grand Slam	Hard	(Spain) Garbiñe Muguruza	4–6, 6–2, 6–2
Win	5–1	Mar 2020	Lyon Open, France	International	Hard (i)	(Germany) Anna-Lena Friedsam	6–2, 4–6, 6–4
Loss	5–2	Oct 2020	French Open, France	Grand Slam	Clay	(Poland) Iga Świątek	4–6, 1–6
Loss	5–3	Sep 2023	Southern California Open, United States	WTA 500	Hard	(Czech Republic) Barbora Krejčíková	4–6, 6–2, 4–6
Loss	5–4	Oct 2024	Pan Pacific Open, Japan	WTA 500	Hard	(China) Zheng Qinwen	6–7^{(5–7)}, 3–6
Loss	5–5	Apr 2025	Charleston Open, United States	WTA 500	Clay	(United States) Jessica Pegula	3–6, 5–7

=== Doubles: 4 (4 titles, 1 runner-up) ===
Legend Premier M / WTA 1000 (2–0) WTA 500 (1–1) International (1–0)	Finals by surface Hard (4–1)	Finals by setting Outdoor (4–1)

Result	W–L	Date	Tournament	Tier	Surface	Partner	Opponents	Score
Win	1–0	Jan 2019	Auckland Classic, New Zealand	International	Hard	(Canada) Eugenie Bouchard	(New Zealand) Paige Hourigan (United States) Taylor Townsend	1–6, 6–1, [10–7]
Win	2–0	Oct 2019	China Open, China	Premier M	Hard	(United States) Bethanie Mattek-Sands	(Latvia) Jeļena Ostapenko (Ukraine) Dayana Yastremska	6–3, 6–7^{(5–7)}, [10–7]
Win	3–0	Feb 2024	Abu Dhabi Open, UAE	WTA 500	Hard	(United States) Bethanie Mattek-Sands	(Czech Republic) Linda Nosková (United Kingdom) Heather Watson	6–4, 7–6^{(7–4)}
Win	4–0	Mar 2024	Miami Open, US	WTA 1000	Hard	(United States) Bethanie Mattek-Sands	(Canada) Gabriela Dabrowski (New Zealand) Erin Routliffe	4–6, 7–6^{(7–5)}, [11–9]
Loss	4–1	Jul 2025	Citi DC Open, US	WTA 500	Hard	(United States) Caroline Dolehide	(United States) Taylor Townsend (China) Shuai Zhang	1–6, 1–6

== ITF Circuit finals ==
=== Singles: 8 (4 titles, 4 runner-ups) ===
Legend $50/60,000 tournaments (3–2) $25,000 tournaments (1–1) $10,000 tournaments (0–1)	Finals by surface Hard (3–2) Clay (1–2) Grass (0–0)

Result	W–L	Date	Tournament	Tier	Surface	Opponent	Score
Loss	0–1	Mar 2015	ITF Gainesville, United States	10,000	Clay	(United States) Katerina Stewart	4–6, 6–4, 4–6
Win	1–1	Jan 2016	ITF Wesley Chapel, United States	25,000	Clay	(Czech Republic) Jesika Malečková	6–2, 6–2
Win	2–1	Jul 2016	ITF Sacramento, United States	50,000	Hard	(United States) Grace Min	4–6, 6–1, 6–4
Loss	2–2	Oct 2016	ITF Las Vegas, United States	60,000	Hard	(Belgium) Alison Van Uytvanck	6–3, 6–7^{(4–7)}, 2–6
Loss	2–3	Jan 2017	ITF Orlando, United States	25,000	Clay	(Poland) Katarzyna Piter	7–6^{(7–4)}, 2–6, 4–6
Win	3–3	Jul 2017	ITF Stockton, United States	60,000	Hard	(United States) Ashley Kratzer	6–0, 6–1
Loss	3–4	Aug 2017	ITF Lexington, United States	60,000	Hard	(United States) Grace Min	4–6, 1–6
Win	4–4	Jul 2018	ITF Berkeley, United States	60,000	Hard	(United States) Nicole Gibbs	6–0, 6–4

=== Doubles: 6 (2 titles, 4 runner-ups) ===
Legend $80,000 tournaments (1–1) $60,000 tournaments (1–0) $25,000 tournaments (0–2) $10,000 tournaments (0–1)	Finals by surface Hard (2–1) Clay (0–3) Grass (0–0) Carpet (0–0)

Result	W–L	Date	Tournament	Tier	Surface	Partner	Opponents	Score
Loss	0–1	Mar 2015	ITF Gainesville, United States	10,000	Clay	(United States) Marie Norris	(United States) Ingrid Neel (Hungary) Fanny Stollár	3–6, 3–6
Loss	0–2	Jan 2017	ITF Wesley Chapel, United States	25,000	Clay	(United States) Elizabeth Halbauer	(South Africa) Chanel Simmonds (Mexico) Renata Zarazúa	2–6, 6–7^{(5–7)}
Loss	0–3	Feb 2017	ITF Surprise, United States	25,000	Hard	(United States) Usue Maitane Arconada	(Colombia) Mariana Duque-Mariño (Argentina) Nadia Podoroska	6–4, 0–6, [5–10]
Win	1–3	Jul 2017	ITF Stockton, United States	60,000	Hard	(United States) Usue Maitane Arconada	(Australia) Tammi Patterson (South Africa) Chanel Simmonds	4–6, 6–1, [10–5]
Win	2–3	Nov 2017	ITF Waco, United States	80,000	Hard	(Russia) Anastasiya Komardina	(United States) Jessica Pegula (United States) Taylor Townsend	7–5, 5–7, [11–9]
Loss	2–4	Apr 2018	ITF Dothan, United States	80,000	Clay	(United States) Jamie Loeb	(Chile) Alexa Guarachi (New Zealand) Erin Routliffe	4–6, 6–2, [9–11]

== Billie Jean King Cup participation ==
This table is current through the 2020 Fed Cup

Group membership World Group (0–3) World Group Play-off / Finals Qualifying (3–1)	Matches by surface Hard (3–4) Clay (0–0) Grass (0–0)	Matches by type Singles (2–4) Doubles (1–0)	Matches by location United States (3–2) Away (0–2)

=== Singles (2–4) ===
Edition	Round	Date	Location	Against	Surface	Opponent	W/L	Score
2018	WG F	Nov 2018	Prague (CZE)	Czech Republic	Hard (i)	Barbora Strýcová	L	7–6^{(7–5)}, 1–6, 4–6
2018	WG F	Nov 2018	Prague (CZE)	Czech Republic	Hard (i)	Kateřina Siniaková	L	5–7, 7–5, 5–7
2019	WG QF	Feb 2019	Asheville (USA)	Australia	Hard (i)	Ashleigh Barty	L	1–6, 6–7^{(2–7)}
2019	WG PO	Apr 2019	San Antonio (USA)	Switzerland	Hard (i)	Timea Bacsinszky	W	6–3, 7–6^{(7–4)}
2020–21	F Q	Feb 2020	Everett (USA)	Latvia	Hard (i)	Anastasija Sevastova	W	6–2, 6–2
2020–21	F Q	Feb 2020	Everett (USA)	Latvia	Hard (i)	Jeļena Ostapenko	L	3–6, 6–2, 2–6

=== Doubles (1–0) ===
Edition	Round	Date	Location	Against	Surface	Partner	Opponent	W/L	Score
2020–21	F Q	Feb 2020	Everett (USA)	Latvia	Hard (i)	Bethanie Mattek-Sands	Anastasija Sevastova; Jeļena Ostapenko	W	6–4, 6–0

== Junior finals ==
=== Grand Slam tournaments ===
==== Singles: 1 (1 runner-up) ====
Result	Year	Tournament	Surface	Opponent	Score
Loss	2015	US Open	Hard	(Hungary) Dalma Gálfi	5–7, 4–6

=== ITF Junior Circuit ===
==== Singles: 5 (3 titles, 2 runner–ups) ====
Legend
Grade A (1–0)
Grade 1 (1–0)
Grade 4 (1–2)

Result	W–L	Date	Tournament	Tier	Surface	Opponent	Score
Win	1–0	May 2013	ITF Daytona Beach, U.S.	Grade 4	Clay	(United States) Marie Norris	6–3, 5–7, 6–4
Loss	1–1	Jul 2013	ITF Junkanoo Bowl - Nassau, Bahamas	Grade 4	Hard	(The Bahamas) Simone Pratt	1–4 ret.
Loss	1–2	Jul 2013	ITF Tihta Aruba, Aruba (Netherlands)	Grade 4	Hard	(United States) Johnnise Renaud	3–6, 2–6
Win	2–2	Dec 2014	Orange Bowl, U.S.	Grade A	Clay	(United States) Ingrid Neel	6–3, 6–3
Win	3–2	Apr 2015	ITF Carson, U.S.	Grade 1	Hard	(Hungary) Fanni Stollar	6–3, 6–7^{(7–9)}, 6–0

==== Doubles: 9 (7 titles, 2 runner–ups) ====
Legend
Grade A (0–2)
Grade 1 (3–0)
Grade 4 (4–0)

Result	W–L	Date	Tournament	Tier	Surface	Partner	Opponents	Score
Win	1–0	Mar 2013	ITF Junior Circuit 2013, Trinidad & Tobago	Grade 4	Hard	(United States) Jenna Friedel	(United States) Stephanie Nemtsova (South Korea) Jeung Won Yang	6–3, 6–3
Win	2–0	Jul 2013	ITF Junkanoo Bowl - Nassau, Bahamas	Grade 4	Hard	(United States) Mia Horvit	(United States) Madison Harrison (United States) Elizabeth Sutherland	6–2, 6–1
Win	3–0	Jul 2013	ITF Tihta Aruba, Aruba (Netherlands)	Grade 4	Hard	(United States) Priyanka Sundhar	(United States) Madison Harrison (United States) Elizabeth Sutherland	6–7^{(9–11)}, 6–3, 10–7
Win	4–0	Nov 2013	ITF Evert American, U.S.	Grade 4	Hard	(United States) Katerina Stewart	(United States) Jessica Golovin (United States) Jada Robinson	6–1, 6–4
Loss	4–1	Dec 2013	Orange Bowl, U.S.	Grade A	Clay	(United States) Kaitlyn McCarthy	(Australia) Naiktha Bains (United States) Tornado Alicia Black	0–6, 1–6
Win	5–1	Dec 2014	ITF Eddie Herr Championship, U.S.	Grade 1	Clay	(United States) Katerina Stewart	(Australia) Naiktha Bains (Brazil) Luisa Stefani	6–1, 6–1
Win	6–1	Apr 2015	ITF Easter Bowl Championship, U.S.	Grade 1	Hard	(United Kingdom) Katie Swan	(United States) Caroline Dolehide (United States) Ena Shibahara	4–6, 6–4, 10–6
Loss	6–2	Nov 2015	Abierto Juvenil Mexicanoy - Mexico City, Mexico	Grade A	Clay	(United Kingdom) Katie Swan	(Russia) Anna Blinkova (Russia) Evgeniya Levashova	5–7, 4–6
Win	7–2	Dec 2015	ITF Eddie Herr Championship, U.S. (2)	Grade 1	Clay	(United States) Katerina Stewart	(Hungary) Dalma Gálfi (Slovakia) Tereza Mihalíková	6–3, 6–1

== WTA Tour career earnings ==
Current as of June 6, 2022

Year	Grand Slam singles titles	WTA singles titles	Total singles titles	Earnings ($)	Money list rank
2015	0	0	0	42,183	258
2016	0	0	0	68,707	220
2017	0	0	0	215,713	140
2018	0	0	0	545,876	67
2019	0	3	3	2,037,257	18
2020	1	1	2	4,302,970	1
2021	0	0	0	512,224	77
2022	0	0	0	169,675	138
Career	1	4	5	7,903,601	78

== Career Grand Slam statistics ==
=== Seedings ===
The tournaments won by Kenin are in boldface, and advanced into finals by Kenin are in italics.

Year	Australian Open	French Open	Wimbledon	US Open
2015	did not play	did not play	did not play	not seeded
2016	did not play	did not play	did not play	not seeded
2017	did not play	did not play	did not qualify	not seeded
2018	not seeded	not seeded	not seeded	not seeded
2019	not seeded	not seeded	27th	20th
2020	**14th (1)**	4th (1)	cancelled	2nd
2021	4th	4th	4th	did not play
2022	11th	did not play	did not play	wild card
2023	protected ranking	did not qualify	qualifier	not seeded
2024	not seeded	not seeded	not seeded	not seeded
2025	not seeded	31	28	26
2026	27	not seeded	not seeded	

=== Best Grand Slam results details ===
Winners are represented in boldface, and runner–ups in italics.

Australian Open
2020 Australian Open (14th seed)
Round	Opponent	Rank	Score
1R	(Italy) Martina Trevisan (Q)	154	6–2, 6–4
2R	(United States) Ann Li (Q)	142	6–1, 6–3
3R	(China) Zhang Shuai	35	7–5, 7–6^{(9–7)}
4R	(United States) Coco Gauff	67	6–7^{(5–7)}, 6–3, 6–0
QF	(Tunisia) Ons Jabeur	78	6–4, 6–4
SF	(Australia) Ashleigh Barty (1)	**1**	7–6^{(8–6)}, 7–5
**W**	(Spain) Garbiñe Muguruza	32	4–6, 6–2, 6–2

Wimbledon Championships
2023 Wimbledon (qualifier)
Round	Opponent	Rank	Score
Q1	(United States) Irina Falconi Hartman (PR)	–	6–3, 6–2
Q2	(Japan) Moyuka Uchijima	153	6–0, 6–3
Q3	(United States) Taylor Townsend (9)	107	6–3, 6–3
1R	(United States) Coco Gauff (7)	7	6–4, 4–6, 6–2
2R	(China) Wang Xinyu	73	6–4, 6–3
3R	(Ukraine) Elina Svitolina (WC)	76	6–7^{(3–7)}, 2–6

French Open
2020 French Open (4th seed)
Round	Opponent	Rank	Score
1R	(Russia) Liudmila Samsonova	164	6–4, 3–6, 6–3
2R	(Romania) Ana Bogdan	93	3–6, 6–3, 6–2
3R	(Romania) Irina Bara (Q)	142	6–2, 6–0
4R	(France) Fiona Ferro	49	2–6, 6–2, 6–1
QF	(United States) Danielle Collins	57	6–4, 4–6, 6–0
SF	(Czech Republic) Petra Kvitová (7)	11	6–4, 7–5
F	(Poland) **Iga Świątek**	54	4–6, 1–6

US Open
2020 US Open (2nd seed)
Round	Opponent	Rank	Score
1R	(Belgium) Yanina Wickmayer	146	6–2, 6–2
2R	(Canada) Leylah Fernandez	104	6–4, 6–3
3R	(Tunisia) Ons Jabeur (27)	31	7–6^{(7–4)}, 6–3
4R	(Belgium) Elise Mertens (18)	18	3–6, 3–6

== Wins against top 10 players ==
- Kenin has a 13–20 record against players who were, at the time the match was played, ranked in the top 10.

Season	2018	2019	2020	2023	2024	2025	Total
Wins	2	5	1	2	2	2	14

No.	Player	Rk	Event	Surface	Rd	Score	Rk	Years	Ref
1	(France) Caroline Garcia	6	Mallorca Open, Spain	Grass	QF	6–3, 6–3	91	2018	
2	(Germany) Julia Görges	10	Wuhan Open, China	Hard	2R	6–3, 2–6, 6–4	62	2018	
3	(United States) Serena Williams	10	French Open, France	Clay	3R	6–2, 7–5	35	2019	
4	(Australia) Ashleigh Barty	1	Canadian Open, Canada	Hard	2R	6–7^{(5–7)}, 6–3, 6–4	29	2019	
5	(Ukraine) Elina Svitolina	7	Canadian Open, Canada	Hard	QF	7–6^{(7–2)}, 6–4	29	2019	
6	(Ukraine) Elina Svitolina	7	Cincinnati Open, United States	Hard	3R	6–3, 7–6^{(7–3)}	22	2019	
7	(Japan) Naomi Osaka	1	Cincinnati Open, United States	Hard	QF	6–4, 1–6, 2–0 ret.	22	2019	
8	(Australia) Ashleigh Barty	1	Australian Open, Australia	Hard	SF	7–6^{(8–6)}, 7–5	15	2020	
9	Aryna Sabalenka	2	Italian Open, Italy	Clay	2R	7–6^{(7–4)}, 6–2	134	2023	
10	(United States) Coco Gauff	7	Wimbledon, United Kingdom	Grass	1R	6–4, 4–6, 6–2	128	2023	
11	(Tunisia) Ons Jabeur	9	Italian Open, Italy	Clay	2R	7–5, 2–6, 6–4	58	2024	
12	Daria Kasatkina	9	Pan Pacific Open, Japan	Hard	QF	6–3, 6–4	155	2024	
13	(Italy) Jasmine Paolini	4	Dubai Tennis Championships, UAE	Hard	3R	6–4, 6–0	56	2025	
14	Ekaterina Alexandrova	10	Pan Pacific Open, Japan	Hard	QF	6–0, 2–6, 7–6^{(7–3)}	25	2025	

- Key: (Rk) first use, opponent rank; (Rd) round; (Rk) 2nd use, player rank; (Ref) reference; (F) final; (SF) semifinal; (QF) quarterfinal; (#R) rounds 4, 3, 2, 1; (RR) round-robin stage; (Q#) qualifying rounds or stages (3), 2, 1.

== Double bagel matches ==
Result	No.	Year	Tournament	Surface	Opponent	Rk	Rd
Loss	1.	2020	Italian Open, Italy	Clay	(Belarus) Victoria Azarenka	4	2R
Loss	2.	2025	Miami Open, United States	Hard	(United States) Coco Gauff	46	2R
