= 2017 FSP Gold River Women's Challenger – Singles =

Singles
- 2017 FSP Gold River Women's Challenger

Final
- Champion: (United States) Amanda Anisimova
- Runner-up: (Croatia) Ajla Tomljanović
- Score: Walkover

Events
Singles	Doubles
← 2016 ·	FSP Gold River Women's Challenger	· 2018 →

Sofia Kenin was the defending champion, but lost in the semifinals to Ajla Tomljanović.

Amanda Anisimova won the title after Tomljanović withdrew from the final.

== Seeds ==
1. (United States) Jennifer Brady (quarterfinals)
2. (United States) Kristie Ahn (semifinals)
3. (United States) Kayla Day (first round)
4. (United States) Sachia Vickery (first round)
5. (United States) Jamie Loeb (first round)
6. (Australia) Lizette Cabrera (first round)
7. (United States) Danielle Collins (quarterfinals)
8. (United States) Sofia Kenin (semifinals)

== Draw ==
=== Key ===
- Q = Qualifier
- WC = Wild card
- LL = Lucky loser
- Alt = Alternate
- SE = Special exempt
- PR = Protected ranking
- ITF = ITF entry
- JE = Junior exempt
- w/o = Walkover
- r = Retired
- d = Defaulted
- SR = Special ranking

=== Finals ===
Semifinals
8	(United States) Sofia Kenin	4	0
(Croatia) Ajla Tomljanović	6	6
(United States) Amanda Anisimova	6	5	6
2	(United States) Kristie Ahn	4	7	1

Final
(Croatia) Ajla Tomljanović
(United States) Amanda Anisimova	w/o

=== Top half ===
First round
1	(United States) J Brady	3	6	6
(United States) C Liu	6	4	4
Q	(United States) E Shibahara	2	6	6
Q	(China) S Xu	6	3	2
(United States) UM Arconada	6	3	6
(United States) G Min	4	6	4
WC	(United States) J Taggart	1	2
8	(United States) S Kenin	6	6
4	(United States) S Vickery	3	1
(Croatia) A Tomljanović	6	6
(United States) J Elie	4	6	0
(New Zealand) M Erakovic	6	3	0^{r}
(Belarus) V Lapko	6	4	6^{10}
(United States) I Falconi	2	6	7^{12}
WC	(United States) R Anderson	7	6
6	(Australia) L Cabrera	5	3

Second round
1	(United States) J Brady	6	6
Q	(United States) E Shibahara	2	4
(United States) UM Arconada	3	7^{7}	1
8	(United States) S Kenin	6	6^{4}	6
(Croatia) A Tomljanović	6	6
(United States) J Elie	2	1
(United States) I Falconi	6	4	6
WC	(United States) R Anderson	3	6	3

Quarterfinals
1	(United States) J Brady	6	1	3
8	(United States) S Kenin	1	6	6
(Croatia) A Tomljanović	6	7^{7}
(United States) I Falconi	1	6^{2}

Semifinals
8	(United States) S Kenin	4	0
(Croatia) A Tomljanović	6	6

=== Bottom half ===
First round
5	(United States) J Loeb	7	2	3
Q	(South Africa) C Simmonds	5	6	6
(Serbia) J Jakšić	7	4	5
Q	(United States) V Duval	5	6	7
WC	(United States) E Bektas	3	6	2
PR	(Japan) K Date	6	2	0^{r}
(United States) A Anisimova	6	7
3	(United States) K Day	3	5
7	(United States) D Collins	6	6
WC	(United States) A Tatishvili	0	3
(United States) D Lao	6	6
SE	(United States) A Kratzer	3	3
(France) T Andrianjafitrimo	3	0
(United States) C Dolehide	6	6
(United States) F Di Lorenzo	4	4
2	(United States) K Ahn	6	6

Second round
Q	(South Africa) C Simmonds	6	7^{7}
Q	(United States) V Duval	2	6^{4}
WC	(United States) E Bektas	3	2
(United States) A Anisimova	6	6
7	(United States) D Collins	6	6
(United States) D Lao	4	3
(United States) C Dolehide	1	6^{2}
2	(United States) K Ahn	6	7^{7}

Quarterfinals
Q	(South Africa) C Simmonds	6	2	1
(United States) A Anisimova	2	6	6
7	(United States) D Collins	6	3	4
2	(United States) K Ahn	4	6	6

Semifinals
(United States) A Anisimova	6	5	6
2	(United States) K Ahn	4	7	1
