= 2017 Stockton Challenger =

- Date: 17–23 July
- Edition: 3rd
- Category: ITF Women's Circuit
- Prize money: $60,000
- Surface: Hard
- Location: Stockton, United States

Champions

Singles
- (United States) Sofia Kenin

Doubles
- (United States) Usue Maitane Arconada / (United States) Sofia Kenin
← 2016 ·	Stockton Challenger	· 2018 →

The 2017 Stockton Challenger was a professional tennis tournament played on outdoor hard courts. It was the third edition of the tournament and was part of the 2017 ITF Women's Circuit. It took place in Stockton, United States, on 17–23 July 2017.

== Singles main draw entrants ==
=== Seeds ===
Country	Player	Rank^{1}	Seed
USA	Kristie Ahn	116	1
USA	Jamie Loeb	147	2
USA	Danielle Collins	164	3
USA	Sofia Kenin	165	4
AUS	Lizette Cabrera	168	5
USA	Grace Min	198	6
USA	Usue Maitane Arconada	224	7
USA	Jennifer Elie	228	8

- ^{1} Rankings as of 3 July 2017.

=== Other entrants ===
The following players received a wildcard into the singles main draw:

- (United States) Ashley Kratzer
- (United States) Ashley Lahey
- (United States) Lauren Marker
- (United States) Anna Tatishvili

The following player received entry by a protected ranking:

- (Japan) Kimiko Date
- (China) Xu Shilin

The following players received entry from the qualifying draw:

- (United States) Victoria Duval
- (United States) Michaela Gordon
- (United States) Ingrid Neel
- (United States) Allie Will

== Champions ==
=== Singles ===
- (United States) Sofia Kenin def. (United States) Ashley Kratzer, 6–0, 6–1

=== Doubles ===
- (United States) Usue Maitane Arconada / (United States) Sofia Kenin def. (Australia) Tammi Patterson / (South Africa) Chanel Simmonds, 4–6, 6–1, [10–5]
