= 2016 Stockton Challenger =

- Date: 11–17 July
- Edition: 2nd
- Category: ITF Women's Circuit
- Prize money: $50,000
- Surface: Hard
- Location: Stockton, California, United States

Champions

Singles
- (Belgium) Alison Van Uytvanck

Doubles
- (Czech Republic) Kristýna Plíšková / (Belgium) Alison Van Uytvanck
← 2015 ·	Stockton Challenger	· 2017 →

The 2016 Stockton Challenger was a professional tennis tournament played on outdoor hard courts. It was the second edition of the tournament and part of the 2016 ITF Women's Circuit, offering a total of $50,000 in prize money. It took place in Stockton, California, United States, on 11–17 July 2016.

== Singles main draw entrants ==
=== Seeds ===
Country	Player	Rank^{1}	Seed
USA	Nicole Gibbs	76	1
CZE	Kristýna Plíšková	107	2
BEL	Alison Van Uytvanck	127	3
POL	Urszula Radwańska	149	4
USA	Grace Min	151	5
USA	Taylor Townsend	154	6
CHN	Zhu Lin	162	7
USA	Sachia Vickery	180	8

- ^{1} Rankings as of 27 June 2016.

=== Other entrants ===
The following player received a wildcard into the singles main draw:

- (United States) ~~Kayla Day~~ (withdrew)
- (United States) Michaela Gordon
- (United States) Ashley Kratzer
- (United States) Sanaz Marand

The following players received entry from the qualifying draw:

- (United States) Jennifer Elie
- (United States) Desirae Krawczyk
- (South Africa) Chanel Simmonds
- (United States) Caitlin Whoriskey

The following player received entry by a lucky loser spot:

- (Australia) Priscilla Hon

The following player received entry by a protected ranking:

- (Canada) Aleksandra Wozniak

== Champions ==
=== Singles ===
- (Belgium) Alison Van Uytvanck def. (Russia) Anastasia Pivovarova, 6–3, 3–6, 6–2

=== Doubles ===
- (Czech Republic) Kristýna Plíšková / (Belgium) Alison Van Uytvanck def. (United States) Robin Anderson / (United States) Maegan Manasse, 6–2, 6–3
