= 2016 Stockton Challenger – Singles =

Singles
- 2016 Stockton Challenger

Final
- Champion: (Belgium) Alison Van Uytvanck
- Runner-up: (Russia) Anastasia Pivovarova
- Score: 6–3, 3–6, 6–2

Events
Singles	Doubles
← 2015 ·	Stockton Challenger	· 2017 →

Nao Hibino was the defending champion, but chose not to participate.

Alison Van Uytvanck won the title, defeating Anastasia Pivovarova in the final, 6–3, 3–6, 6–2.

== Seeds ==
1. (United States) Nicole Gibbs (second round)
2. (Czech Republic) Kristýna Plíšková (first round)
3. (Belgium) Alison Van Uytvanck (champion)
4. (Poland) Urszula Radwańska (quarterfinals)
5. (United States) Grace Min (first round)
6. (United States) Taylor Townsend (first round)
7. (China) Zhu Lin (first round)
8. (United States) Sachia Vickery (second round)

== Main draw ==
=== Key ===
- Q = Qualifier
- WC = Wild card
- LL = Lucky loser
- Alt = Alternate
- SE = Special exempt
- PR = Protected ranking
- ITF = ITF entry
- JE = Junior exempt
- w/o = Walkover
- r = Retired
- d = Defaulted
- SR = Special ranking

=== Finals ===
Semifinals
(United States) Catherine Bellis	2	6	4
3	(Belgium) Alison Van Uytvanck	6	4	6
(Portugal) Michelle Larcher de Brito	4	4
(Russia) Anastasia Pivovarova	6	6

Final
3	(Belgium) Alison Van Uytvanck	6	3	6
(Russia) Anastasia Pivovarova	3	6	2

=== Top half ===
First round
1	(United States) N Gibbs	5	6	7
PR	(Canada) A Wozniak	7	4	5
(Russia) V Kan	4	5
(Australia) Ar Rodionova	6	7
(China) Z Yang	2	6^{4}
(United States) C Bellis	6	7^{7}
Q	(United States) D Krawczyk	5	3
8	(United States) S Vickery	7	6
3	(Belgium) A Van Uytvanck	7	6
(United States) M Oudin	5	2
(United States) K Ahn	4	6	4
(Japan) R Sawayanagi	6	4	6
Q	(United States) J Elie	4	6	6
WC	(United States) A Kratzer	6	4	1
(United States) J Loeb	6	6
5	(United States) G Min	2	1

Second round
1	(United States) N Gibbs	6^{3}	6^{6}
(Australia) Ar Rodionova	7^{7}	7^{8}
(United States) C Bellis	6	6
8	(United States) S Vickery	4	0
3	(Belgium) A Van Uytvanck	6	6
(Japan) R Sawayanagi	2	0
Q	(United States) J Elie	3	6	2
(United States) J Loeb	6	4	6

Quarterfinals
(Australia) Ar Rodionova	2	3
(United States) C Bellis	6	6
3	(Belgium) A Van Uytvanck	6	0	6
(United States) J Loeb	4	6	3

Semifinals
(United States) C Bellis	2	6	4
3	(Belgium) A Van Uytvanck	6	4	6

=== Bottom half ===
First round
7	(China) L Zhu	1	1
Q	(United States) C Whoriskey	6	6
(Portugal) M Larcher de Brito	6	4	6
(Uzbekistan) S Sharipova	2	6	0
WC	(United States) M Gordon	6	2	1
(Australia) S Sanders	3	6	6
LL	(Australia) P Hon	6^{4}	5
4	(Poland) U Radwańska	7^{7}	7
6	(United States) T Townsend	4	4
(Japan) M Hibi	6	6
(United States) R Anderson	6	7^{7}
WC	(United States) S Marand	2	6^{1}
(United States) A Muhammad	3	6	2
(Russia) A Pivovarova	6	3	6
Q	(South Africa) C Simmonds	7	6
2	(Czech Republic) Kr Plíšková	5	3

Second round
Q	(United States) C Whoriskey	4	3
(Portugal) M Larcher de Brito	6	6
(Australia) S Sanders	3	2
4	(Poland) U Radwańska	6	6
(Japan) M Hibi	6	4	1
(United States) R Anderson	3	6	6
(Russia) A Pivovarova	6	6
Q	(South Africa) C Simmonds	4	4

Quarterfinals
(Portugal) M Larcher de Brito	6	7
4	(Poland) U Radwańska	3	5
(United States) R Anderson	4	5
(Russia) A Pivovarova	6	7

Semifinals
(Portugal) M Larcher de Brito	4	4
(Russia) A Pivovarova	6	6
