= 2015 Stockton Challenger – Singles =

Singles
- 2015 Stockton Challenger

Final
- Champion: (Japan) Nao Hibino
- Runner-up: (Belgium) An-Sophie Mestach
- Score: 6–1, 7–6^{(8–6)}

Events
Singles	Doubles
← 2014 ·	Stockton Challenger	· 2016 →

This was a new event to the ITF Women's Circuit in 2015.

Nao Hibino won the title, defeating An-Sophie Mestach in the final, 6–1, 7–6^{(8–6)}.

== Seeds ==
1. (Belgium) An-Sophie Mestach (final)
2. (Japan) Eri Hozumi (first round)
3. (United States) Maria Sanchez (first round)
4. (United States) Catherine Bellis (first round)
5. (Japan) Nao Hibino (champion)
6. (United States) Julia Boserup (first round)
7. (Japan) Mayo Hibi (quarterfinals)
8. (United Kingdom) Naomi Broady (second round)

== Main draw ==
=== Key ===
- Q = Qualifier
- WC = Wild card
- LL = Lucky loser
- Alt = Alternate
- SE = Special exempt
- PR = Protected ranking
- ITF = ITF entry
- JE = Junior exempt
- w/o = Walkover
- r = Retired
- d = Defaulted
- SR = Special ranking

=== Finals ===
Semifinals
1	(Belgium) An-Sophie Mestach	6	5	6
(Japan) Kimiko Date-Krumm	2	7	2
5	(Japan) Nao Hibino	7^{7}	7^{7}
(United States) Sanaz Marand	6^{5}	6^{4}

Final
1	(Belgium) An-Sophie Mestach	1	6^{6}
5	(Japan) Nao Hibino	6	7^{8}

=== Top half ===
First round
1	(Belgium) A-S Mestach	6	7^{10}
WC	(United States) A Stevenson	3	6^{8}
(Ukraine) A Kalinina	6	6
(France) C de Bernardi	4	4
Q	(Australia) S Sanders	6	1	6
(United States) A Kiick	1	6	0
(United States) S Crawford	6^{5}	0
7	(Japan) M Hibi	7^{7}	6
4	(United States) C Bellis	4	1
(Serbia) J Jakšić	6	6
(United States) J Pegula	1	1
WC	(United States) D Lao	6	6
(United States) L Embree	6	1	2
Q	(United States) K Ahn	1	6	6
(Japan) K Date-Krumm	6	6
6	(United States) J Boserup	4	4

Second round
1	(Belgium) A-S Mestach	7^{7}	6
(Ukraine) A Kalinina	6^{3}	2
Q	(Australia) S Sanders	5	3
7	(Japan) M Hibi	7	6
(Serbia) J Jakšić	1	4
WC	(United States) D Lao	6	6
Q	(United States) K Ahn	3	2
(Japan) K Date-Krumm	6	6

Quarterfinals
1	(Belgium) A-S Mestach	7	7
7	(Japan) M Hibi	5	5
WC	(United States) D Lao	3	2
(Japan) K Date-Krumm	6	6

Semifinals
1	(Belgium) A-S Mestach	6	5	6
(Japan) K Date-Krumm	2	7	2

=== Bottom half ===
First round
5	(Japan) N Hibino	7	7
Q	(South Africa) C Simmonds	5	5
(United States) C Whoriskey	6^{5}	6^{4}
WC	(United States) J Loeb	7^{7}	7^{7}
(France) A Hesse	3	6	6
(United Kingdom) E Webley-Smith	6	3	1
(Australia) J Moore	3	7	7
3	(United States) M Sanchez	6	5	5
8	(United Kingdom) N Broady	6	6
Q	(Canada) H El Tabakh	3	2
(United States) M Oudin	7^{7}	6
(France) M Arcangioli	6^{5}	4
WC	(United States) B Austin	5	5
(United States) S Marand	7	7
(United States) J Brady	6	6
2	(Japan) E Hozumi	3	3

Second round
5	(Japan) N Hibino	6	6
WC	(United States) J Loeb	3	3
(France) A Hesse	6	6
(Australia) J Moore	4	4
8	(United Kingdom) N Broady	2	6	1
(United States) M Oudin	6	2	6
(United States) S Marand	6	6
(United States) J Brady	2	4

Quarterfinals
5	(Japan) N Hibino	6	6
(France) A Hesse	1	2
(United States) M Oudin	2	2
(United States) S Marand	6	6

Semifinals
5	(Japan) N Hibino	7^{7}	7^{7}
(United States) S Marand	6^{5}	6^{4}
