= 2015 Stockton Challenger =

- Date: 13–19 July
- Edition: 1st
- Category: ITF Women's Circuit
- Prize money: $50,000
- Surface: Hard
- Location: Stockton, California, United States

Champions

Singles
- (Japan) Nao Hibino

Doubles
- (United States) Jamie Loeb / (United States) Sanaz Marand
Stockton Challenger	· 2016 →

The 2015 Stockton Challenger was a professional tennis tournament played on outdoor hard courts. It was the first edition of the tournament and part of the 2015 ITF Women's Circuit, offering a total of $50,000 in prize money. It took place in Stockton, California, United States, on 13–19 June 2015.

== Singles main draw entrants ==
=== Seeds ===
Country	Player	Rank^{1}	Seed
BEL	An-Sophie Mestach	111	1
JPN	Eri Hozumi	165	2
USA	Maria Sanchez	168	3
USA	Catherine Bellis	169	4
JPN	Nao Hibino	170	5
USA	Julia Boserup	190	6
JPN	Mayo Hibi	197	7
GBR	Naomi Broady	200	8

- ^{1} Rankings as of 29 June 2015

=== Other entrants ===
The following players received wildcards into the singles main draw:

- (United States) Brooke Austin
- (United States) Danielle Lao
- (United States) Jamie Loeb
- (United States) Alexandra Stevenson

The following players received entry from the qualifying draw:

- (United States) Kristie Ahn
- (Canada) Heidi El Tabakh
- (Australia) Storm Sanders
- (South Africa) Chanel Simmonds

== Champions ==
=== Singles ===
- (Japan) Nao Hibino def. (Belgium) An-Sophie Mestach, 6–1, 7–6^{(8–6)}

=== Doubles ===
- (United States) Jamie Loeb / (United States) Sanaz Marand def. (United States) Kaitlyn Christian / (United States) Danielle Lao, 6–3, 6–4
