= 2017 Stockton Challenger – Singles =

Singles
- 2017 Stockton Challenger

Final
- Champion: (United States) Sofia Kenin
- Runner-up: (United States) Ashley Kratzer
- Score: 6–0, 6–1

Events
Singles	Doubles
← 2016 ·	Stockton Challenger	· 2018 →

The Women’s Singles tournament of the 2017 Stockton Challenger tennis championship took place in Stockton, US, between 17 July and 23 July 2017. 32 players from 10 countries took part in the 5-round tournament. The final winner was Sofia Kenin of the US, who defeated Ashley Kratzer of the US. The defending champion from 2016, Alison Van Uytvanck of Belgium, did not compete.

== Seeds ==
1. (United States) Kristie Ahn (second round)
2. (United States) Jamie Loeb (semifinals)
3. (United States) Danielle Collins (second round)
4. (United States) Sofia Kenin (champion)
5. (Australia) Lizette Cabrera (first round)
6. (United States) Grace Min (second round)
7. (United States) Usue Maitane Arconada (second round)
8. (United States) Jennifer Elie (first round)

== Draw ==
=== Key ===
- Q = Qualifier
- WC = Wild card
- LL = Lucky loser
- Alt = Alternate
- SE = Special exempt
- PR = Protected ranking
- ITF = ITF entry
- JE = Junior exempt
- w/o = Walkover
- r = Retired
- d = Defaulted
- SR = Special ranking

=== Finals ===
Semifinals
(Croatia) Ajla Tomljanović	6^{3}	5
4	(United States) Sofia Kenin	7^{7}	7
WC	(United States) Ashley Kratzer	6	6
2	(United States) Jamie Loeb	2	4

Final
4	(United States) Sofia Kenin	6	6
WC	(United States) Ashley Kratzer	0	1

=== Top half ===
First round
1	(United States) K Ahn	6	7
(United States) S Chang	2	5
(United States) I Falconi	6	6
(Australia) T Patterson	4	2
(Croatia) A Tomljanović	6	6
Q	(United States) M Gordon	1	0
(France) T Andrianjafitrimo	1	7	6
5	(Australia) L Cabrera	6	5	2
4	(United States) S Kenin	6	7
(Belarus) V Lapko	4	5
(United States) R Anderson	6	6
(United States) H Chang	2	1
Q	(United States) A Will	5	3
(United States) F Di Lorenzo	7	6
PR	(Japan) K Date	6	3	0
7	(United States) UM Arconada	4	6	6

Second round
1	(United States) K Ahn	4	0
(United States) I Falconi	6	6
(Croatia) A Tomljanović	5	6	6
(France) T Andrianjafitrimo	7	4	0
4	(United States) S Kenin	6	6
(United States) R Anderson	4	3
(United States) F Di Lorenzo	7^{7}	6
7	(United States) UM Arconada	6^{5}	4

Quarterfinals
(United States) I Falconi	6	0	2
(Croatia) A Tomljanović	2	6	6
4	(United States) S Kenin	6	6^{5}	6
(United States) F Di Lorenzo	3	7^{7}	1

Semifinals
(Croatia) A Tomljanović	6^{3}	5
4	(United States) S Kenin	7^{7}	7

=== Bottom half ===
First round
8	(United States) J Elie	4	6^{4}
WC	(United States) A Tatishvili	6	7^{7}
WC	(United States) A Kratzer	6	7^{7}
WC	(United States) A Lahey	3	6^{3}
WC	(United States) L Marker	6	1	5
PR	(China) S Xu	4	6	7
Q	(United States) V Duval	1	6^{5}
3	(United States) D Collins	6	7^{7}
6	(United States) G Min	0	6	6
(Canada) K Sebov	6	1	0
(United States) A Anisimova	6	6
Q	(United States) I Neel	0	1
(United States) C Dolehide	6	6
(South Africa) C Simmonds	3	4
(Belgium) A-S Mestach	3	2
2	(United States) J Loeb	6	6

Second round
WC	(United States) A Tatishvili	4	5
WC	(United States) A Kratzer	6	7
PR	(China) S Xu	6	6
3	(United States) D Collins	3	3
6	(United States) G Min	1	2
(United States) A Anisimova	6	6
(United States) C Dolehide	3	2
2	(United States) J Loeb	6	6

Quarterfinals
WC	(United States) A Kratzer	6	6
PR	(China) S Xu	4	2
(United States) A Anisimova	4	2
2	(United States) J Loeb	6	6

Semifinals
WC	(United States) A Kratzer	6	6
2	(United States) J Loeb	2	4
