= 2015 Stockton Challenger – Doubles =

Doubles
- 2015 Stockton Challenger

Final
- Champions: (United States) Jamie Loeb (United States) Sanaz Marand
- Runners-up: (United States) Kaitlyn Christian (United States) Danielle Lao
- Score: 6–3, 6–4

Events
Singles	Doubles
← 2014 ·	Stockton Challenger	· 2016 →

This was a new event in the ITF Women's Circuit in 2015.

Jamie Loeb and Sanaz Marand won the title, defeating Kaitlyn Christian and Danielle Lao in an all-American final, 6–3, 6–4.

== Seeds ==
1. (Japan) Eri Hozumi / (Belgium) An-Sophie Mestach (quarterfinals)
2. (United Kingdom) Naomi Broady / (France) Amandine Hesse (semifinals)
3. (United States) Jan Abaza / (United States) Melanie Oudin (quarterfinals)
4. (United States) Jamie Loeb / (United States) Sanaz Marand (champions)

== Draw ==
=== Key ===
- Q = Qualifier
- WC = Wild card
- LL = Lucky loser
- Alt = Alternate
- SE = Special exempt
- PR = Protected ranking
- ITF = ITF entry
- JE = Junior exempt
- w/o = Walkover
- r = Retired
- d = Defaulted
- SR = Special ranking

First round
1	(Japan) E Hozumi (Belgium) A-S Mestach	6	4	[11]
(United States) J Cako (Serbia) J Jakšić	3	6	[9]
(Japan) N Hibino (United Kingdom) E Webley-Smith	6	6
WC	(United States) J Elie (United States) R Valdes	1	4
4	(United States) J Loeb (United States) S Marand	6	2	[10]
(United States) J Pegula (United States) M Sanchez	3	6	[3]
(Ukraine) A Kalinina (Australia) J Moore	3	0
(Australia) S Sanders (South Africa) C Simmonds	6	6
WC	(United States) S Chang (United States) J Elbaba	4	1
(United States) K Christian (United States) D Lao	6	6
(United States) A Weinhold (United States) C Whoriskey	3	4
3	(United States) J Abaza (United States) M Oudin	6	6
(France) M Arcangioli (Mexico) R Zarazúa	7^{7}	6^{6}	[10]
WC	(United States) J Kuhlman (United States) M Manasse	6^{3}	7^{8}	[7]
(United States) J Boserup (United States) S Crawford	3	3
2	(United Kingdom) N Broady (France) A Hesse	6	6

Quarterfinals
1	(Japan) E Hozumi (Belgium) A-S Mestach	5	2
(Japan) N Hibino (United Kingdom) E Webley-Smith	7	6
4	(United States) J Loeb (United States) S Marand	6^{4}	7	[10]
(Australia) S Sanders (South Africa) C Simmonds	7^{7}	5	[8]
(United States) K Christian (United States) D Lao	6	7
3	(United States) J Abaza (United States) M Oudin	3	5
(France) M Arcangioli (Mexico) R Zarazúa	6	4	[4]
2	(United Kingdom) N Broady (France) A Hesse	2	6	[10]

Semifinals
(Japan) N Hibino (United Kingdom) E Webley-Smith	3	6	[8]
4	(United States) J Loeb (United States) S Marand	6	4	[10]
(United States) K Christian (United States) D Lao	6	6
2	(United Kingdom) N Broady (France) A Hesse	1	3

Final
4	(United States) J Loeb (United States) S Marand	6	6
(United States) K Christian (United States) D Lao	3	4
