= 2017 Stockton Challenger – Doubles =

Doubles
- 2017 Stockton Challenger

Final
- Champion: (United States) Usue Maitane Arconada (United States) Sofia Kenin
- Runner-up: (Australia) Tammi Patterson (South Africa) Chanel Simmonds
- Score: 4–6, 6–1, [10–5]

Events
Singles	Doubles
← 2016 ·	Stockton Challenger	· 2018 →

Kristýna Plíšková and Alison Van Uytvanck were the defending champions, but both players chose not to participate.

Usue Maitane Arconada and Sofia Kenin won the title, defeating Tammi Patterson and Chanel Simmonds in the final, 4–6, 6–1, [10–5].

== Seeds ==
1. (United States) Jamie Loeb / (Belgium) An-Sophie Mestach (semifinals)
2. (United States) Sophie Chang / (United States) Alexandra Mueller (quarterfinals)
3. (Australia) Tammi Patterson / (South Africa) Chanel Simmonds (final)
4. (United States) Desirae Krawczyk / (Mexico) Giuliana Olmos (quarterfinals)

== Draw ==
=== Key ===
- Q = Qualifier
- WC = Wild card
- LL = Lucky loser
- Alt = Alternate
- SE = Special exempt
- PR = Protected ranking
- ITF = ITF entry
- JE = Junior exempt
- w/o = Walkover
- r = Retired
- d = Defaulted
- SR = Special ranking

First round
1	(United States) J Loeb (Belgium) A-S Mestach	6	6
(Georgia (country)) S Devidze (Netherlands) R Nederstigt	1	1
(United States) B Minor (United States) A Will	6	3	[10]
(United States) J Elie (United States) J Wacnik	3	6	[7]
4	(United States) D Krawczyk (Mexico) G Olmos	6	6
(United States) F Di Lorenzo (United States) I Neel	3	4
(United States) UM Arconada (United States) S Kenin	6	6
(Ukraine) M Kozachenko (United States) A Wise	1	2
(Australia) L Cabrera (United States) C Dolehide	6	7
(United States) B Boren (United States) H Chang	0	5
(Israel) M Sela (United States) KK Vyrlan	0	1
3	(Australia) T Patterson (South Africa) C Simmonds	6	6
(United States) K Facey (United States) A Kratzer	4	4
(United States) K Christian (United States) E Shibahara	6	6
(United States) I Falconi (United States) G Min	4	3
2	(United States) S Chang (United States) A Mueller	6	6

Quarterfinals
1	(United States) J Loeb (Belgium) A-S Mestach	7^{7}	6
(United States) B Minor (United States) A Will	6^{5}	4
4	(United States) D Krawczyk (Mexico) G Olmos	4	6	[6]
(United States) UM Arconada (United States) S Kenin	6	2	[10]
(Australia) L Cabrera (United States) C Dolehide	6	4	[8]
3	(Australia) T Patterson (South Africa) C Simmonds	2	6	[10]
(United States) K Christian (United States) E Shibahara	6	5	[11]
2	(United States) S Chang (United States) A Mueller	3	7	[9]

Semifinals
1	(United States) J Loeb (Belgium) A-S Mestach	1	3
(United States) UM Arconada (United States) S Kenin	6	6
3	(Australia) T Patterson (South Africa) C Simmonds	6	1	[10]
(United States) K Christian (United States) E Shibahara	4	6	[5]

Final
(United States) UM Arconada (United States) S Kenin	4	6	[10]
3	(Australia) T Patterson (South Africa) C Simmonds	6	1	[5]
