= 2016 Stockton Challenger – Doubles =

Doubles
- 2016 Stockton Challenger

Final
- Champions: (Czech Republic) Kristýna Plíšková (Belgium) Alison Van Uytvanck
- Runners-up: (United States) Robin Anderson (United States) Maegan Manasse
- Score: 6–2, 6–3

Events
Singles	Doubles
← 2015 ·	Stockton Challenger	· 2017 →

Jamie Loeb and Sanaz Marand were the defending champions, but both players chose to compete with different partners. Loeb partnered Catherine Bellis, but lost in the first round. Marand partnered Melanie Oudin, but lost in the quarterfinals.

Kristýna Plíšková and Alison Van Uytvanck won the title, defeating Robin Anderson and Maegan Manasse in the final, 6–2, 6–3.

== Seeds ==
1. (United States) Asia Muhammad / (United States) Taylor Townsend (semifinals, withdrew)
2. (United States) Ashley Weinhold / (United States) Caitlin Whoriskey (quarterfinals)
3. (United States) Jacqueline Cako / (Brazil) Gabriela Cé (first round)
4. (Czech Republic) Kristýna Plíšková / (Belgium) Alison Van Uytvanck (champions)

== Draw ==
=== Key ===
- Q = Qualifier
- WC = Wild card
- LL = Lucky loser
- Alt = Alternate
- SE = Special exempt
- PR = Protected ranking
- ITF = ITF entry
- JE = Junior exempt
- w/o = Walkover
- r = Retired
- d = Defaulted
- SR = Special ranking

First round
1	(United States) A Muhammad (United States) T Townsend	7^{7}	7^{7}
(South Africa) C Simmonds (Mexico) R Zarazúa	6^{4}	6^{4}
(United States) K Ahn (United States) N Gibbs	2	6	[6]
(United States) S Marand (United States) M Oudin	6	3	[10]
3	(United States) J Cako (Brazil) G Cé	5	4
(Belgium) G Minnen (Japan) R Sawayanagi	7	6
(United States) R Anderson (United States) M Manasse	2	6	[11]
WC	(United States) K Christian (United States) S Santamaria	6	3	[9]
(United States) YK Chiang (Ukraine) E Ianchuk	6	7
(United States) C Bellis (United States) J Loeb	3	5
WC	(United States) A Facey (United States) K Facey	3	2
4	(Czech Republic) Kr Plíšková (Belgium) A Van Uytvanck	6	6
WC	(United States) D Krawczyk (United States) E Shibahara	7	6^{3}	[6]
(Australia) P Hon (Australia) S Sanders	5	7^{7}	[10]
(Russia) V Kan (Uzbekistan) S Sharipova	3	1
2	(United States) A Weinhold (United States) C Whoriskey	6	6

Quarterfinals
1	(United States) A Muhammad (United States) T Townsend	6	6
(United States) S Marand (United States) M Oudin	2	3
(Belgium) G Minnen (Japan) R Sawayanagi	4	6^{6}
(United States) R Anderson (United States) M Manasse	6	7^{8}
(United States) YK Chiang (Ukraine) E Ianchuk	3	4
4	(Czech Republic) Kr Plíšková (Belgium) A Van Uytvanck	6	6
(Australia) P Hon (Australia) S Sanders	7	6
2	(United States) A Weinhold (United States) C Whoriskey	5	1

Semifinals
1	(United States) A Muhammad (United States) T Townsend
(United States) R Anderson (United States) M Manasse	w/o
4	(Czech Republic) Kr Plíšková (Belgium) A Van Uytvanck	7^{7}	7
(Australia) P Hon (Australia) S Sanders	6^{5}	5

Final
(United States) R Anderson (United States) M Manasse	2	3
4	(Czech Republic) Kr Plíšková (Belgium) A Van Uytvanck	6	6
