= 2016 FSP Gold River Women's Challenger – Singles =

Singles
- 2016 FSP Gold River Women's Challenger

Final
- Champion: (United States) Sofia Kenin
- Runner-up: (United States) Grace Min
- Score: 4–6, 6–1, 6–4

Events
Singles	Doubles
← 2015 ·	FSP Gold River Women's Challenger	· 2017 →

Anhelina Kalinina was the defending champion, but chose not to participate.

Sofia Kenin won the title, defeating Grace Min in an all-American final, 4–6, 6–1, 6–4.

== Seeds ==
1. (Belgium) Alison Van Uytvanck (first round)
2. (United States) Grace Min (final)
3. (Belgium) An-Sophie Mestach (quarterfinals)
4. (United States) Robin Anderson (first round, retired)
5. (Serbia) Jovana Jakšić (first round)
6. (United Kingdom) Tara Moore (second round)
7. (Japan) Mayo Hibi (second round)
8. (Uzbekistan) Sabina Sharipova (semifinals, retired)

== Main draw ==
=== Key ===
- Q = Qualifier
- WC = Wild card
- LL = Lucky loser
- Alt = Alternate
- ITF = ITF entry
- PR = Protected ranking
- SR = Special ranking
- SE = Special exempt
- JE = Junior exempt
- JR = Junior Accelerator Programme entrant
- CO = College Accelerator Programme entrant
- NG = Next Gen Accelerator Program entrant
- w/o = Walkover
- r = Retired
- d = Defaulted

=== Finals ===
Semifinals
(United States) Sofia Kenin	6	6
Q	(Russia) Valeria Solovyeva	4	4
8	(Uzbekistan) Sabina Sharipova	0	0^{r}
2	(United States) Grace Min	6	3

Final
(United States) Sofia Kenin	4	6	6
2	(United States) Grace Min	6	1	4

=== Top half ===
First round
1	(Belgium) A Van Uytvanck	6	4	3
LL	(France) C Roméo	3	6	6
Q	(Australia) L Cabrera	4	4
WC	(United States) E Halbauer	6	6
(Belgium) G Minnen	6	1	6
(United Kingdom) F Christie	3	6	1
(United States) S Kenin	6	6
5	(Serbia) J Jakšić	3	3
3	(Belgium) A-S Mestach	7^{8}	6
(Italy) C Ferrando	6^{6}	3
Q	(United States) A Stevenson	4	0
(Japan) R Sawayanagi	6	6
Q	(South Africa) C Simmonds	6	4	3
Q	(Russia) V Solovyeva	4	6	6
(United States) J Loeb	2	3
7	(Japan) M Hibi	6	6

Second round
LL	(France) C Roméo	7^{9}	6
WC	(United States) E Halbauer	6^{7}	1
(Belgium) G Minnen	3	6	4
(United States) S Kenin	6	3	6
3	(Belgium) A-S Mestach	6	6
(Japan) R Sawayanagi	3	2
Q	(Russia) V Solovyeva	6	6
7	(Japan) M Hibi	2	2

Quarterfinals
LL	(France) C Roméo	3	6	3
(United States) S Kenin	6	4	6
3	(Belgium) A-S Mestach	6	2	3
Q	(Russia) V Solovyeva	3	6	6

Semifinals
(United States) S Kenin	6	6
Q	(Russia) V Solovyeva	4	4

=== Bottom half ===
First round
8	(Uzbekistan) S Sharipova	3	6	6
(Australia) S Sanders	6	1	2
(Australia) P Hon	6	6
WC	(United States) K Vyrlan	2	3
(Ukraine) E Ianchuk	6	3	7
(Japan) S Akita	1	6	5
(Japan) E Hozumi	2
4	(United States) R Anderson	3^{r}
6	(United Kingdom) T Moore	5	6	6
(United Kingdom) L Robson	7	2	4
(Mexico) R Zarazúa	7	3	3
(United States) K Ahn	5	6	6
(Netherlands) M Krajicek	7^{7}	6^{3}	6
WC	(United States) S Santamaria	6^{4}	7^{7}	2
WC	(United States) C Liu	4	4
2	(United States) G Min	6	6

Second round
8	(Uzbekistan) S Sharipova	6	6
(Australia) P Hon	3	3
(Ukraine) E Ianchuk	7^{7}	6
(Japan) E Hozumi	6^{4}	1
6	(United Kingdom) T Moore	2	1
(United States) K Ahn	6	6
(Netherlands) M Krajicek	6	1	5
2	(United States) G Min	3	6	7

Quarterfinals
8	(Uzbekistan) S Sharipova	6	6
(Ukraine) E Ianchuk	4	4
(United States) K Ahn	1	2
2	(United States) G Min	6	6

Semifinals
8	(Uzbekistan) S Sharipova	0	0^{r}
2	(United States) G Min	6	3
