= 2017 US Open – Women's singles =

Women's singles
- 2017 US Open

Final
- Champion: (United States) Sloane Stephens
- Runner-up: (United States) Madison Keys
- Score: 6–3, 6–0

Details
- Draw: 128 (16Q / 8WC)
- Seeds: 32

Events
Singles	men	women		boys	girls
Doubles	men	women	mixed	boys	girls
WC Singles	men	women	quad
WC Doubles	men	women	quad
Legends	men	women	mixed
- US Open

Sloane Stephens defeated Madison Keys in the final, 6–3, 6–0 to win the women's singles tennis title at the 2017 US Open. It was her first major title. Stephens was the first player using a protected ranking to win a major title, and the second unseeded woman in the Open Era to win the US Open (after Kim Clijsters in 2009). It was the first all-American final at the US Open since 2002; for the first time at a major since the 1985 Wimbledon Championships, all four semifinalists were American, and all from the same country overall.

Angelique Kerber was the defending champion, but was defeated in the first round by Naomi Osaka. Kerber was the second US Open defending champion to lose in the first round, after Svetlana Kuznetsova in 2005. Osaka would go on to win the title the next year.

Garbiñe Muguruza became the new world No. 1 after Karolína Plíšková failed to defend her finalist points. Eight of the top nine seeds (with the exception of Kerber) were in contention for the top ranking.

This was Maria Sharapova's first major since the 2016 Australian Open, following a suspension for violating anti-doping rules. She was awarded a wildcard into the main draw, and was defeated by Anastasija Sevastova in the fourth round.

Venus Williams became the first player in history to reach the semifinals of the US Open 10 years apart and then do so another 10 years apart, in 1997 (at 17 years, 79 days old), 2007, and 2017 (at 37 years, 79 days old). Her younger sister, Serena Williams, would join her in doing so at the 1999 (at 17 years, 348 days old), 2009, and 2019 (at 37 years, 344 days old) US Opens. Kaia Kanepi was the first qualifier to reach the quarterfinals since Barbara Gerken in 1981, and was the lowest-ranked player ever to reach a major quarterfinal, being ranked No. 418.

This was the final major appearance for former world No. 1 Jelena Janković, who lost to Petra Kvitová in the first round. Janković would formally retire from tennis five years later.

== Seeds ==
1. (Czech Republic) Karolína Plíšková (quarterfinals)
2. (Romania) Simona Halep (first round)
3. (Spain) Garbiñe Muguruza (fourth round)
4. (Ukraine) Elina Svitolina (fourth round)
5. (Denmark) Caroline Wozniacki (second round)
6. (Germany) Angelique Kerber (first round)
7. (United Kingdom) Johanna Konta (first round)
8. (Russia) Svetlana Kuznetsova (second round)
9. (United States) Venus Williams (semifinals)
10. (Poland) Agnieszka Radwańska (third round)
11. (Slovakia) Dominika Cibulková (second round)
12. (Latvia) Jeļena Ostapenko (third round)
13. (Czech Republic) Petra Kvitová (quarterfinals)
14. (France) Kristina Mladenovic (first round)
15. (United States) Madison Keys (final)
16. (Latvia) Anastasija Sevastova (quarterfinals)

17. (Russia) Elena Vesnina (third round)
18. (France) Caroline Garcia (third round)
19. (Russia) Anastasia Pavlyuchenkova (first round)
20. (United States) CoCo Vandeweghe (semifinals)
21. (Croatia) Ana Konjuh (first round)
22. (China) Peng Shuai (second round)
23. (Czech Republic) Barbora Strýcová (second round)
24. (Netherlands) Kiki Bertens (first round)
25. (Australia) Daria Gavrilova (second round)
26. (Estonia) Anett Kontaveit (first round)
27. (China) Zhang Shuai (third round)
28. (Ukraine) Lesia Tsurenko (first round)
29. (Croatia) Mirjana Lučić-Baroni (second round)
30. (Germany) Julia Görges (fourth round)
31. (Slovakia) Magdaléna Rybáriková (third round)
32. (United States) Lauren Davis (first round)

Click on the seed number of a player to go to their draw section.

== Draw ==
Key

- Q = Qualifier
- WC = Wild card
- LL = Lucky loser
- Alt = Alternate
- ITF = ITF entry
- PR = Protected ranking
- SR = Special ranking
- SE = Special exempt
- JE = Junior exempt
- JR = Junior Accelerator Programme entrant
- CO = College Accelerator Programme entrant
- NG = Next Gen Accelerator Program entrant
- w/o = Walkover
- r = Retired
- d = Defaulted

=== Finals ===
Quarterfinals
1	(Czech Republic) Karolína Plíšková	6^{4}	3
20	(United States) CoCo Vandeweghe	7^{7}	6
15	(United States) Madison Keys	6	6
Q	(Estonia) Kaia Kanepi	3	3
9	(United States) Venus Williams	6	3	7^{7}
13	(Czech Republic) Petra Kvitová	3	6	6^{2}
PR	(United States) Sloane Stephens	6	3	7^{7}
16	(Latvia) Anastasija Sevastova	3	6	6^{4}

Semifinals
20	(United States) CoCo Vandeweghe	1	2
15	(United States) Madison Keys	6	6
9	(United States) Venus Williams	1	6	5
PR	(United States) Sloane Stephens	6	0	7

Final
15	(United States) Madison Keys	3	0
PR	(United States) Sloane Stephens	6	6

=== Top half ===
==== Section 1 ====
First round
1	(Czech Republic) Ka Plíšková	6	6
(Poland) M Linette	2	1
(Paraguay) V Cepede Royg	0	6	1
Q	(United States) N Gibbs	6	1	6
(Japan) R Ozaki	6	6^{5}	7^{7}
Q	(United States) D Lao	3	7^{7}	6^{5}
PR	(Germany) S Lisicki	7^{7}	3	0
27	(China) S Zhang	6^{4}	6	6
23	(Czech Republic) B Strýcová	6	6
(Japan) M Doi	1	3
(United States) J Brady	6	3	6
(Germany) A Petkovic	4	6	1
WC	(United States) T Townsend	4	6	3
(Romania) A Bogdan	6	4	6
(Romania) M Niculescu	6	6
14	(France) K Mladenovic	3	2

Second round
1	(Czech Republic) Ka Plíšková	2	6	6
Q	(United States) N Gibbs	6	3	4
(Japan) R Ozaki	0	3
27	(China) S Zhang	6	6
23	(Czech Republic) B Strýcová	1	1
(United States) J Brady	6	6
(Romania) A Bogdan	2	6	3
(Romania) M Niculescu	6	3	6

Third round
1	(Czech Republic) Ka Plíšková	3	7	6
27	(China) S Zhang	6	5	4
(United States) J Brady	6	4	7^{7}
(Romania) M Niculescu	3	6	6^{3}

Fourth round
1	(Czech Republic) Ka Plíšková	6	6
(United States) J Brady	1	0

==== Section 2 ====
First round
10	(Poland) A Radwańska	6	7^{7}
(Croatia) P Martić	4	6^{3}
Q	(Russia) S Zhuk	6^{3}	3
(Kazakhstan) Y Putintseva	7^{7}	6
(Tunisia) O Jabeur	6	7
WC	(United States) B Minor	1	5
(United States) A Riske	6	3	4
20	(United States) C Vandeweghe	2	6	6
26	(Estonia) A Kontaveit	7^{7}	1	4
(Czech Republic) L Šafářová	6^{5}	6	6
(Japan) N Hibino	6	4	7
(United States) C Bellis	3	6	5
(Japan) K Nara	6	6
(Spain) S Sorribes Tormo	1	2
(Czech Republic) M Vondroušová	6	4	6^{2}
8	(Russia) S Kuznetsova	4	6	7^{7}

Second round
10	(Poland) A Radwańska	7	6
(Kazakhstan) Y Putintseva	5	2
(Tunisia) O Jabeur	6^{6}	2
20	(United States) C Vandeweghe	7^{8}	6
(Czech Republic) L Šafářová	6	3	6
(Japan) N Hibino	1	6	2
(Japan) K Nara	6	3	6
8	(Russia) S Kuznetsova	3	6	3

Third round
10	(Poland) A Radwańska	5	6	4
20	(United States) C Vandeweghe	7	4	6
(Czech Republic) L Šafářová	6	6
(Japan) K Nara	3	2

Fourth round
20	(United States) C Vandeweghe	6	7^{7}
(Czech Republic) L Šafářová	4	6^{2}

==== Section 3 ====
First round
4	(Ukraine) E Svitolina	6	6^{5}	6
(Czech Republic) K Siniaková	0	7^{7}	3
(Russia) E Rodina	7^{7}	6
(Canada) E Bouchard	6^{2}	1
(United States) S Rogers	6	4	6
WC	(United States) K Day	2	6	4
Q	(United States) A Kiick	2	1
25	(Australia) D Gavrilova	6	6
17	(Russia) E Vesnina	6	6
Q	(Russia) A Blinkova	1	3
(United States) M Brengle	2	3
(Belgium) K Flipkens	6	6
(Germany) T Maria	6	6
WC	(United States) A Kratzer	1	1
(Belgium) E Mertens	3	6^{6}
15	(United States) M Keys	6	7^{8}

Second round
4	(Ukraine) E Svitolina	6	6
(Russia) E Rodina	4	4
(United States) S Rogers	7^{8}	4	7^{7}
25	(Australia) D Gavrilova	6^{6}	6	6^{5}
17	(Russia) E Vesnina	6	6
(Belgium) K Flipkens	4	4
(Germany) T Maria	3	4
15	(United States) M Keys	6	6

Third round
4	(Ukraine) E Svitolina	6	7
(United States) S Rogers	4	5
17	(Russia) E Vesnina	6	4	1
15	(United States) M Keys	2	6	6

Fourth round
4	(Ukraine) E Svitolina	6^{2}	6	4
15	(United States) M Keys	7^{7}	1	6

==== Section 4 ====
First round
12	(Latvia) J Ostapenko	6	1	6
(Spain) L Arruabarrena	2	6	1
Q	(Netherlands) L Kerkhove	1	3
(Romania) S Cîrstea	6	6
(Russia) D Kasatkina	6^{7}	6	6
(China) Q Wang	7^{9}	2	3
(United States) C McHale	3	6	6
19	(Russia) A Pavlyuchenkova	6	3	2
28	(Ukraine) L Tsurenko	3	1
(Belgium) Y Wickmayer	6	6
Q	(Estonia) K Kanepi	0	6	6
(Italy) F Schiavone	6	4	2
(Czech Republic) D Allertová	6	7^{7}
Q	(Sweden) R Peterson	2	6^{5}
(Japan) N Osaka	6	6
6	(Germany) A Kerber	3	1

Second round
12	(Latvia) J Ostapenko	6	6
(Romania) S Cîrstea	4	4
(Russia) D Kasatkina	7	6
(United States) C McHale	5	3
(Belgium) Y Wickmayer	4	2
Q	(Estonia) K Kanepi	6	6
(Czech Republic) D Allertová	3	6	5
(Japan) N Osaka	6	4	7

Third round
12	(Latvia) J Ostapenko	3	2
(Russia) D Kasatkina	6	6
Q	(Estonia) K Kanepi	6	2	7
(Japan) N Osaka	3	6	5

Fourth round
(Russia) D Kasatkina	4	4
Q	(Estonia) K Kanepi	6	6

=== Bottom half ===
==== Section 5 ====
First round
5	(Denmark) C Wozniacki	6	7
Q	(Romania) M Buzărnescu	1	5
(Germany) M Barthel	2	1
(Russia) E Makarova	6	6
Q	(Turkey) İ Soylu	4	2
(Spain) C Suárez Navarro	6	6
(Puerto Rico) M Puig	4	7^{7}	6^{4}
29	(Croatia) M Lučić-Baroni	6	6^{4}	7^{7}
24	(Netherlands) K Bertens	3	4
(Greece) M Sakkari	6	6
(Netherlands) R Hogenkamp	5	5
WC	(Australia) Ar Rodionova	7	7
(France) P Parmentier	6	0	6^{6}
(France) O Dodin	3	6	7^{8}
Q	(Slovakia) V Kužmová	3	6	2
9	(United States) V Williams	6	3	6

Second round
5	(Denmark) C Wozniacki	2	7^{7}	1
(Russia) E Makarova	6	6^{5}	6
(Spain) C Suárez Navarro	4	7^{7}	6
29	(Croatia) M Lučić-Baroni	6	6^{4}	2
(Greece) M Sakkari	7	6
WC	(Australia) Ar Rodionova	5	3
(France) O Dodin	5	4
9	(United States) V Williams	7	6

Third round
(Russia) E Makarova	1	6	3
(Spain) C Suárez Navarro	6	3	6
(Greece) M Sakkari	3	4
9	(United States) V Williams	6	6

Fourth round
(Spain) C Suárez Navarro	3	6	1
9	(United States) V Williams	6	3	6

==== Section 6 ====
First round
13	(Czech Republic) P Kvitová	7	7
(Serbia) J Janković	5	5
(United Kingdom) H Watson	4	4
(France) A Cornet	6	6
Q	(Germany) A Zaja	2	3
(Russia) E Alexandrova	6	6
Q	(Czech Republic) T Martincová	0	1
18	(France) C Garcia	6	6
31	(Slovakia) M Rybáriková	6	6
(Italy) C Giorgi	3	4
(Czech Republic) Kr Plíšková	6	6
PR	(Japan) M Eguchi	2	2
Q	(United States) C Liu	6^{8}	6^{3}
(China) Y Duan	7^{10}	7^{7}
(United States) V Lepchenko	0	3
3	(Spain) G Muguruza	6	6

Second round
13	(Czech Republic) P Kvitová	6	6
(France) A Cornet	1	2
(Russia) E Alexandrova	6	3	0
18	(France) C Garcia	4	6	6
31	(Slovakia) M Rybáriková	7^{7}	7^{7}
(Czech Republic) Kr Plíšková	6^{4}	6^{3}
(China) Y Duan	4	0
3	(Spain) G Muguruza	6	6

Third round
13	(Czech Republic) P Kvitová	6	6
18	(France) C Garcia	0	4
31	(Slovakia) M Rybáriková	1	1
3	(Spain) G Muguruza	6	6

Fourth round
13	(Czech Republic) P Kvitová	7^{7}	6
3	(Spain) G Muguruza	6^{3}	3

==== Section 7 ====
First round
7	(United Kingdom) J Konta	6	3	4
(Serbia) A Krunić	4	6	6
PR	(Australia) A Tomljanović	7	6
(Sweden) J Larsson	5	4
(China) S Zheng	6	3	6
(Belgium) A Van Uytvanck	4	6	1
(Germany) A Beck	1	0
30	(Germany) J Görges	6	6
21	(Croatia) A Konjuh	6	0	1
(Australia) A Barty	4	6	6
(Belarus) A Sasnovich	6	6
(United States) J Boserup	2	2
PR	(United States) S Stephens	7	6
(Italy) R Vinci	5	1
(Slovakia) J Čepelová	7^{7}	3	2
11	(Slovakia) D Cibulková	6^{5}	6	6

Second round
(Serbia) A Krunić	6	6
PR	(Australia) A Tomljanović	3	2
(China) S Zheng	2	1
30	(Germany) J Görges	6	6
(Australia) A Barty	6	7^{9}
(Belarus) A Sasnovich	1	6^{7}
PR	(United States) S Stephens	6	5	6
11	(Slovakia) D Cibulková	2	7	3

Third round
(Serbia) A Krunić	3	3
30	(Germany) J Görges	6	6
(Australia) A Barty	2	4
PR	(United States) S Stephens	6	6

Fourth round
30	(Germany) J Görges	3	6	1
PR	(United States) S Stephens	6	3	6

==== Section 8 ====
First round
16	(Latvia) A Sevastova	7	6
(Germany) C Witthöft	5	1
(Romania) I-C Begu	2	6^{7}
Q	(Ukraine) K Kozlova	6	7^{9}
(Croatia) D Vekić	6	6
(Brazil) B Haddad Maia	2	1
WC	(France) A Hesse	4	1
22	(China) S Peng	6	6
32	(United States) L Davis	5	5
WC	(United States) S Kenin	7	7
(Russia) N Vikhlyantseva	6	4	1
Q	(United States) S Vickery	4	6	6
(Switzerland) V Golubic	5	7	5
(Hungary) T Babos	7	5	7
WC	(Russia) M Sharapova	6	4	6
2	(Romania) S Halep	4	6	3

Second round
16	(Latvia) A Sevastova	6	6
Q	(Ukraine) K Kozlova	4	4
(Croatia) D Vekić	6	6
22	(China) S Peng	0	2
WC	(United States) S Kenin	6	4	7^{7}
Q	(United States) S Vickery	3	6	6^{0}
(Hungary) T Babos	7^{7}	4	1
WC	(Russia) M Sharapova	6^{4}	6	6

Third round
16	(Latvia) A Sevastova	6	6
(Croatia) D Vekić	2	3
WC	(United States) S Kenin	5	2
WC	(Russia) M Sharapova	7	6

Fourth round
16	(Latvia) A Sevastova	5	6	6
WC	(Russia) M Sharapova	7	4	2

== Seeded players ==
The following are the seeded players. Seeds are based on the rankings as of August 21, 2017. Rank and points before are as of August 28, 2017.

Seed	Rank	Player	Points before	Points defending	Points won	Points after	Status
1	1	(Czech Republic) Karolína Plíšková	6,390	1,300	430	5,520	Quarterfinals lost to (United States) CoCo Vandeweghe [20]
2	2	(Romania) Simona Halep	6,385	430	10	5,965	First round lost to (Russia) Maria Sharapova [WC]
3	3	(Spain) Garbiñe Muguruza	5,860	70	240	6,030	Fourth round lost to (Czech Republic) Petra Kvitová [13]
4	4	(Ukraine) Elina Svitolina	5,530	130	240	5,640	Fourth round lost to (United States) Madison Keys [15]
5	5	(Denmark) Caroline Wozniacki	5,350	780	70	4,640	Second round lost to (Russia) Ekaterina Makarova
6	6	(Germany) Angelique Kerber	5,146	2,000	10	3,156	First round lost to (Japan) Naomi Osaka
7	7	(United Kingdom) Johanna Konta	4,750	240	10	4,520	First round lost to (Serbia) Aleksandra Krunić
8	8	(Russia) Svetlana Kuznetsova	4,410	70	70	4,410	Second round lost to (Japan) Kurumi Nara
9	9	(United States) Venus Williams	4,216	240	780	4,756	Semifinals lost to (United States) Sloane Stephens [PR]
10	11	(Poland) Agnieszka Radwańska	3,570	240	130	3,460	Third round lost to (United States) CoCo Vandeweghe [20]
11	10	(Slovakia) Dominika Cibulková	3,830	130	70	3,770	Second round lost to (United States) Sloane Stephens [PR]
12	12	(Latvia) Jeļena Ostapenko	3,382	10	130	3,502	Third round lost to (Russia) Daria Kasatkina
13	14	(Czech Republic) Petra Kvitová	3,120	240	430	3,310	Quarterfinals lost to (United States) Venus Williams [9]
14	13	(France) Kristina Mladenovic	3,155	70	10	3,095	First round lost to (Romania) Monica Niculescu
15	16	(United States) Madison Keys	2,343	240	1,300	3,403	Runner-up, lost to (United States) Sloane Stephens [PR]
16	17	(Latvia) Anastasija Sevastova	2,295	430	430	2,295	Quarterfinals lost to (United States) Sloane Stephens [PR]
17	18	(Russia) Elena Vesnina	2,140	130	130	2,140	Third round lost to (United States) Madison Keys [15]
18	19	(France) Caroline Garcia	2,135	130	130	2,135	Third round lost to (Czech Republic) Petra Kvitová [13]
19	21	(Russia) Anastasia Pavlyuchenkova	2,065	130	10	1,945	First round lost to (United States) Christina McHale
20	22	(United States) CoCo Vandeweghe	1,994	10	780	2,764	Semifinals lost to (United States) Madison Keys [15]
21	23	(Croatia) Ana Konjuh	1,805	430	10	1,385	First round lost to (Australia) Ashleigh Barty
22	24	(China) Peng Shuai	1,800	10	70	1,860	Second round lost to (Croatia) Donna Vekić
23	25	(Czech Republic) Barbora Strýcová	1,725	10	70	1,785	Second round lost to (United States) Jennifer Brady
24	27	(Netherlands) Kiki Bertens	1,670	10	10	1,670	First round lost to (Greece) Maria Sakkari
25	20	(Australia) Daria Gavrilova	2,075	10	70	2,135	Second round lost to (United States) Shelby Rogers
26	29	(Estonia) Anett Kontaveit	1,630	10	10	1,630	First round lost to (Czech Republic) Lucie Šafářová
27	26	(China) Zhang Shuai	1,685	130	130	1,685	Third round lost to (Czech Republic) Karolína Plíšková [1]
28	30	(Ukraine) Lesia Tsurenko	1,625	240	10	1,395	First round lost to (Belgium) Yanina Wickmayer
29	31	(Croatia) Mirjana Lučić-Baroni	1,615	70	70	1,615	Second round lost to (Spain) Carla Suárez Navarro
30	33	(Germany) Julia Görges	1,570	70	240	1,740	Fourth round lost to (United States) Sloane Stephens [PR]
31	32	(Slovakia) Magdaléna Rybáriková	1,577	0	130	1,707	Third round lost to (Spain) Garbiñe Muguruza [3]
32	34	(United States) Lauren Davis	1,476	70	10	1,416	First round lost to (United States) Sofia Kenin [WC]

=== Withdrawn players ===
The following players would have been seeded, but they were not entered or withdrew from the event.

Rank	Player	Points before	Points defending	Points after	Withdrawal reason
15	(United States) Serena Williams	2,810	780	2,030	Pregnancy
28	(Switzerland) Timea Bacsinszky	1,658	70	1,588	Left thigh and wrist injury

== Other entry information ==
=== Wild cards ===
- (United States) Kayla Day
- (France) Amandine Hesse
- (United States) Sofia Kenin (Note: Winner of the Women's USTA Wild Card Challenge held in Stockton, California, Sacramento, California and Lexington, Kentucky)
- (United States) Ashley Kratzer (Note: Winner of the USTA Girls' under-18 national tournament)
- (United States) Brienne Minor (Note: Winner of the women's singles tournament in the 2017 NCAA Division I Tennis Championships)
- (Australia) Arina Rodionova
- (Russia) Maria Sharapova
- (United States) Taylor Townsend

=== Protected ranking ===
- (United States) Sloane Stephens (26) (champion)
- (Australia) Ajla Tomljanović (75)
- (Germany) Sabine Lisicki (92)
- (Japan) Misa Eguchi (109)

=== Qualifiers ===
- (Russia) Anna Blinkova
- (Romania) Mihaela Buzărnescu
- (United States) Nicole Gibbs
- (Estonia) Kaia Kanepi
- (Netherlands) Lesley Kerkhove
- (United States) Allie Kiick
- (Ukraine) Kateryna Kozlova
- (Slovakia) Viktória Kužmová
- (United States) Danielle Lao
- (United States) Claire Liu
- (Czech Republic) Tereza Martincová
- (Sweden) Rebecca Peterson
- (Turkey) İpek Soylu
- (United States) Sachia Vickery
- (Germany) Anna Zaja
- (Russia) Sofya Zhuk

=== Withdrawals ===
- † (United States) Serena Williams (9) → replaced by (Netherlands) Richèl Hogenkamp (99)
- † (Germany) Laura Siegemund (36) → replaced by (Belarus) Aliaksandra Sasnovich (100)
- † (Kazakhstan) Yaroslava Shvedova (83) → replaced by (Belgium) Alison Van Uytvanck (101)
- † (United States) Bethanie Mattek-Sands (90) → replaced by (Tunisia) Ons Jabeur (102)
- † (Slovakia) Kristína Kučová (95) → replaced by (Switzerland) Viktorija Golubic (103)
- † (Luxembourg) Mandy Minella (104) → replaced by (United States) Julia Boserup (105)
- ‡ (Italy) Sara Errani (87) → replaced by (Czech Republic) Denisa Allertová (106)
- ‡ (Switzerland) Timea Bacsinszky (23) → replaced by (France) Pauline Parmentier (107)
- ‡ (Germany) Anna-Lena Friedsam (50 PR) → replaced by (Romania) Ana Bogdan (108)
- ‡ (Australia) Samantha Stosur (38) → replaced by (Germany) Annika Beck (109)
- ‡ (Belarus) Victoria Azarenka (6 PR) → replaced by (Japan) Misa Eguchi (109 PR) (Note: Last direct acceptance)

† – not included on entry list
‡ – withdrew from entry list

== Championship match statistics ==
Category	(United States) Stephens	(United States) Keys
1st serve %	33/44 (75%)	40/55 (73%)
1st serve points won	24 of 33 = 73%	20 of 40 = 50%
2nd serve points won	7 of 11 = 64%	6 of 15 = 40%
Total service points won	31 of 44 = 70.45%	26 of 55 = 47.27%
Aces	0	3
Double faults	0	1
Winners	10	18
Unforced errors	6	30
Net points won	4 of 4 = 100%	9 of 15 = 60%
Break points converted	5 of 12 = 42%	0 of 3 = 0%
Return points won	29 of 55 = 53%	13 of 44 = 30%
Total points won	60	39

== Notes ==
Preceded by 2017 Wimbledon Championships – Women's singles	Grand Slam women's singles	Succeeded by 2018 Australian Open – Women's singles
