= Danielle Lao =

American tennis player

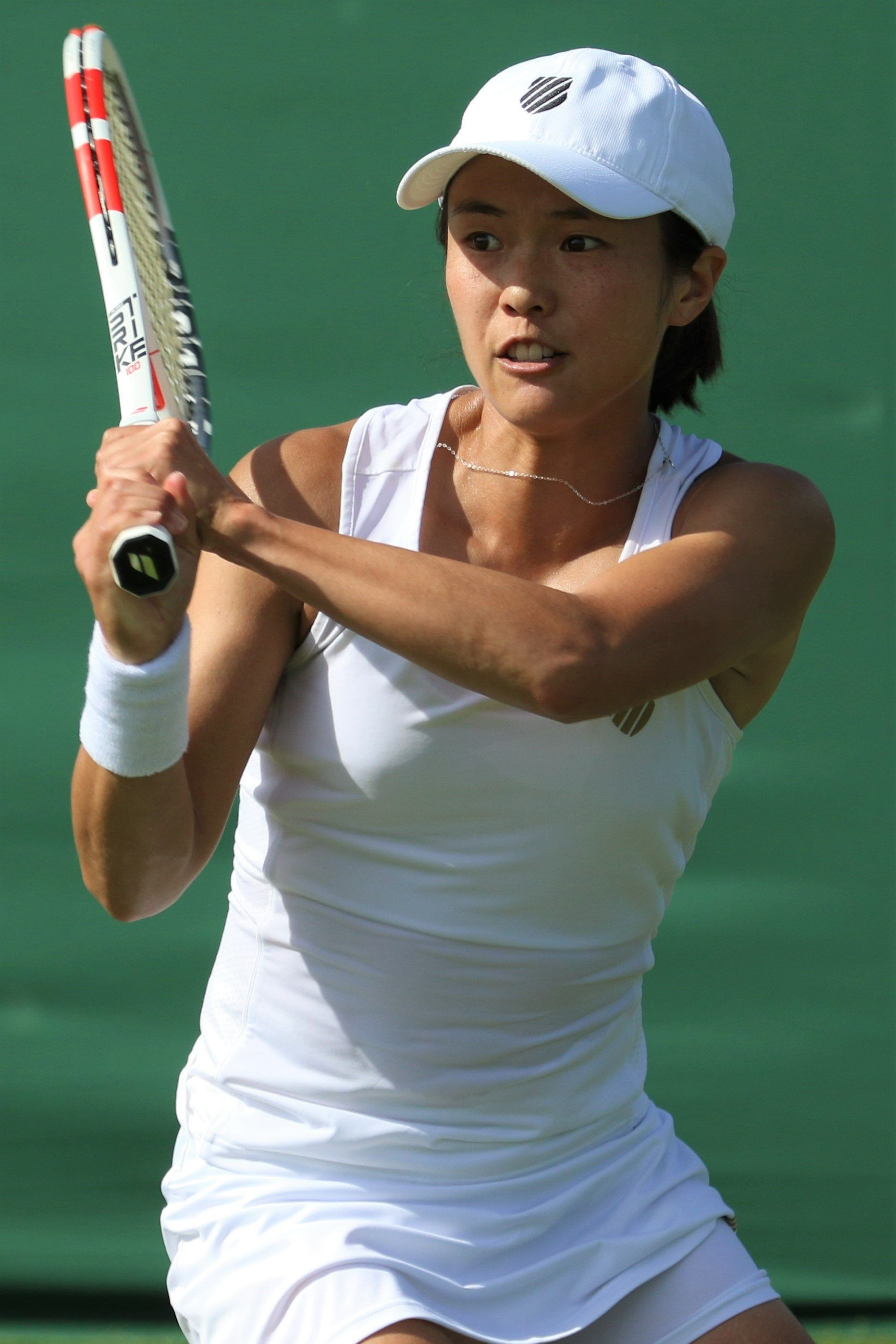
- Lao at the 2022 Wimbledon Championships
- Full name: Danielle Marie Lao
- Country (sports): United States
- Residence: Arcadia, California, US
- Born: May 28, 1991 (age 35) Pasadena, California
- Plays: Right (two-handed backhand)
- College: University of Southern California
- Coach: Roger Smith
- Prize money: $629,247

Singles
- Career record: 214–176
- Career titles: 4 ITF
- Highest ranking: No. 152 (April 1, 2019)

Grand Slam singles results
- Australian Open: Q3 (2019, 2020)
- French Open: Q1 (2018, 2019, 2021)
- Wimbledon: 1R (2021)
- US Open: 1R (2017, 2018)

Doubles
- Career record: 65–59
- Career titles: 3 ITF
- Highest ranking: No. 221 (November 10, 2014)

Grand Slam doubles results
- US Open: 1R (2016)

Danielle Marie Lao (born May 28, 1991) is an inactive American tennis player.

She achieved a career-high singles ranking of 152 by the WTA on April 1, 2019, and has won four singles titles and three doubles titles on the ITF Women's Circuit.

In 2013, she co-authored a top-selling tennis book with Rick Limpert called The Invaluable Experience. In the book, Lao takes readers through her college tennis career and shows why playing a sport in college might be the best decision you could ever make.

== Career ==
=== Juniors and college years ===
Lao won the 2008 USTA National Open. She competed for the USC Trojans where she was a two-time All-American and team captain.

=== Professional ===
Lao plays primarily on the ITF Women's Circuit. Her best performance came at the Stockton Challenger when she reached the final of the $60k tournament, before losing in two close sets to fellow American Madison Brengle.

== Performance timelines ==
Key
W	F	SF	QF	#R	RR	Q#	DNQ	A	NH

(W) winner; (F) finalist; (SF) semifinalist; (QF) quarterfinalist; (#R) rounds 4, 3, 2, 1; (RR) round-robin stage; (Q#) qualification round; (DNQ) did not qualify; (A) absent; (NH) not held; (SR) strike rate (events won / competed); (W–L) win–loss record.
To avoid confusion and double counting, these charts are updated at the conclusion of a tournament or when the player's participation has ended.

Only main-draw results in WTA Tour, Grand Slam tournaments and Olympic Games are included in win–loss records.

=== Singles ===
Tournament	2017	2018	2019	2020	2021	2022	W–L
Grand Slam tournaments
Australian Open	A	A	Q3	Q3	Q1	A	0–0
French Open	A	Q1	Q1	A	Q1	A	0–0
Wimbledon	A	A	Q3	NH	1R	Q3	0–1
US Open	1R	1R	Q1	A	Q1	Q1	0–2
Win–loss	0–1	0–1	0–0	0–0	0–1	0–0	0–3
WTA 1000
Indian Wells Open	A	A	Q1	NH	A	A	0–0
Career statistics
Year-end ranking	238	170	183	217	259	253	$533,319

== ITF Circuit finals ==
=== Singles: 8 (4 titles, 4 runner-ups) ===
Legend $60,000 tournaments $25,000 tournaments $15,000 tournaments	Finals by surface Hard (3–4) Clay (1–0)

Result	W–L	Date	Tournament	Tier	Surface	Opponent	Score
Win	1–0	Apr 2015	León Challenger, Mexico	15,000	Hard	(Bulgaria) Aleksandrina Naydenova	3–6, 6–3, 7–5
Win	2–0	Jun 2015	ITF Baton Rouge, United States	25,000	Clay	(United States) Brooke Austin	7–5, 6–3
Loss	2–1	Feb 2017	ITF Surprise, United States	25,000	Hard	(United States) Caroline Dolehide	3–6, 1–6
Loss	2–2	May 2017	ITF Changwon, South Korea	25,000	Hard	(United Kingdom) Gabriella Taylor	2–6, 2–6
Loss	2–3	Oct 2018	Stockton Challenger, US	60,000	Hard	(United States) Madison Brengle	5–7, 6–7^{(10–12)}
Win	3–3	Mar 2021	ITF Newport Beach, US	25,000	Hard	(United States) Claire Liu	6–2, 4–6, 6–2
Loss	3–4	May 2022	ITF Nottingham, UK	25,000	Hard	(United Kingdom) Sonay Kartal	1–6, 0–6
Win	4–4	Jul 2022	ITF Roehampton, UK	25,000	Hard	(Netherlands) Lesley Pattinama Kerkhove	7–5, 6–4

=== Doubles: 10 (3 titles, 7 runner-ups) ===
Legend $50,000 tournaments $25,000 tournaments $15,000 tournaments	Finals by surface Hard (2–3) Clay (1–4)

Result	W–L	Date	Tournament	Tier	Surface	Partner	Opponents	Score
Loss	0–1	Feb 2014	Rancho Santa Fe Open, United States	25,000	Hard	(United States) Keri Wong	(United States) Samantha Crawford (China) Xu Yifan	6–3, 2–6, [10–12]
Win	1–1	Apr 2014	ITF Pelham, US	25,000	Clay	(United States) Keri Wong	(Bulgaria) Dia Evtimova (Belarus) Ilona Kremen	1–6, 6–4, [10–7]
Loss	1–2	May 2014	ITF Raleigh, US	25,000	Clay	(United States) Keri Wong	(Chinese Taipei) Hsu Chieh-yu (United States) Alexandra Mueller	3–6, 3–6
Loss	1–3	Jun 2014	ITF El Paso, US	25,000	Hard	(Chinese Taipei) Hsu Chieh-yu	(United States) Jamie Loeb (United States) Ashley Weinhold	6–4, 4–6, [13–15]
Loss	1–4	Oct 2014	ITF Florence, US	25,000	Hard	(United States) Keri Wong	(United States) Jamie Loeb (United States) Sanaz Marand	3–6, 6–7^{(5)}
Win	2–4	Apr 2015	León Challenger, Mexico	15,000	Hard	(Brazil) Maria Fernanda Alves	(Germany) Kim Grajdek (Japan) Mayo Hibi	5–7, 7–6^{(5)}, [10–4]
Loss	2–5	Jun 2015	ITF Sumter, US	25,000	Hard	(United States) Jacqueline Cako	(United States) Alexandra Mueller (United States) Ashley Weinhold	7–5, 5–7, [6–10]
Loss	2–6	Jul 2015	Stockton Challenger, US	50,000	Hard	(United States) Kaitlyn Christian	(United States) Jamie Loeb (United States) Sanaz Marand	3–6, 4–6
Win	3–6	Feb 2016	ITF Surprise, US	25,000	Hard	(United States) Jacqueline Cako	(United States) Emina Bektas (United States) Sarah Lee	6–2, 4–6, [10–8]
Loss	3–7	Aug 2016	ITF Fort Worth, US	25,000	Hard	(United States) Jacqueline Cako	(Chinese Taipei) Hsu Chieh-yu (South Africa) Chanel Simmonds	0–6, 4–6
