= Stockton Challenger =

- 2018 Stockton Challenger

Defunct tennis tournament
- Event name: Stockton Challenger
- Location: Stockton, California, United States
- Venue: Eve Zimmerman Tennis Center, University of the Pacific
- Surface: Hard / outdoors
- Website: usta.com
ATP Tour
- Category: ATP Challenger Tour
- Draw: 32S / 32Q / 16D
- Prize money: $100,000
WTA Tour
- Category: ITF Women's Circuit
- Draw: 32S / 32Q / 16D
- Prize money: $60,000

The Stockton Challenger was a professional tennis tournament played on hardcourts. It was part of the ATP Challenger Tour and the ITF Women's Circuit. It was held annually in Stockton, California, United States from 2015 until 2018.

== Past finals ==
=== Men's singles ===
Year	Champion	Runner-up	Score
2018	(South Africa) Lloyd Harris	(Australia) Marc Polmans	6–2, 6–2
2017	(United Kingdom) Cameron Norrie	(Barbados) Darian King	6–1, 6–3
2016	(United States) Frances Tiafoe	(United States) Noah Rubin	6–4, 6–2

=== Women's singles ===
Year	Champion	Runner-up	Score
2018	(United States) Madison Brengle	(United States) Danielle Lao	7–5, 7–6^{(12–10)}
2017	(United States) Sofia Kenin	(United States) Ashley Kratzer	6–0, 6–1
2016	(Belgium) Alison Van Uytvanck	(Russia) Anastasia Pivovarova	6–3, 3–6, 6–2
2015	(Japan) Nao Hibino	(Belgium) An-Sophie Mestach	6–1, 7–6^{(8–6)}

=== Men's doubles ===
Year	Champions	Runners-up	Score
2018	(Barbados) Darian King (United States) Noah Rubin	(Thailand) Sanchai Ratiwatana (Indonesia) Christopher Rungkat	6–3, 6–4
2017	(United Kingdom) Brydan Klein (United Kingdom) Joe Salisbury	(United States) Denis Kudla (Latvia) Miķelis Lībietis	6–2, 6–4
2016	(United States) Brian Baker (Australia) Sam Groth	(Australia) Matt Reid (Australia) John-Patrick Smith	6–2, 4–6, [10–2]

=== Women's doubles ===
Year	Champions	Runners-up	Score
2018	(United States) Hayley Carter (United States) Ena Shibahara	(United States) Quinn Gleason (Brazil) Luisa Stefani	7–5, 5–7, [10–7]
2017	(United States) Usue Maitane Arconada (United States) Sofia Kenin	(Australia) Tammi Patterson (South Africa) Chanel Simmonds	4–6, 6–1, [10–5]
2016	(Czech Republic) Kristýna Plíšková (Belgium) Alison Van Uytvanck	(United States) Robin Anderson (United States) Maegan Manasse	6–2, 6–3
2015	(United States) Jamie Loeb (United States) Sanaz Marand	(United States) Kaitlyn Christian (United States) Danielle Lao	6–3, 6–4
