= Ashley Kratzer =

American tennis player

- Country (sports): United States
- Residence: Newport Beach, California
- Born: February 8, 1999 (age 27) Newport Beach, California
- Height: 1.80 m (5 ft 11 in)
- Plays: Left-handed (two-handed backhand)
- Prize money: $144,302

Singles
- Career record: 124–103
- Highest ranking: No. 200 (August 27, 2018)

Grand Slam singles results
- US Open: 1R (2017)

Doubles
- Career record: 22–34
- Highest ranking: No. 317 (June 11, 2018)

Ashley Kratzer (born February 8, 1999) is a former American tennis player. She had a career-high singles ranking by the WTA of 200, and a best doubles ranking of world No. 317.

In 2017, Kratzer won the USTA National Girls' Championships, securing a wildcard in the main draw of the 2017 US Open.

Kratzer served a four-year ban from 2020 to 2024 for an anti-doping rule violation after testing positive for the growth hormone GHRP-6. Her appeal to the Court of Arbitration for Sport was dismissed in June 2021.

== ITF Circuit finals ==
=== Singles: 4 (4 runner-ups) ===
Legend
W60 tournaments
W25/35 tournaments
W10 tournaments

Result	W–L	Date	Tournament	Tier	Surface	Opponent	Score
Loss	0–1	Jul 2016	ITF Austin, United States	W10	Hard	(Mexico) Marcela Zacarías	5–7, 4–6
Loss	0–2	Jul 2017	Stockton Challenger, United States	W60	Hard	(United States) Sofia Kenin	0–6, 1–6
Loss	0–3	Jun 2018	ITF Naples, United States	W25	Clay	(United States) Nicole Gibbs	4–6, 4–6
Loss	0–4	Sep 2024	ITF San Rafael, United States	W35	Hard	(United States) Robin Anderson	6–7^{(6)}, 2–6

=== Doubles: 1 (runner-up) ===
Legend
W80 tournaments

Result	Date	Tournament	Tier	Surface	Partner	Opponent	Score
Loss	Apr 2018	Charlottesville Open, United States	W80	Clay	(United States) Whitney Osuigwe	(United States) Sophie Chang (United States) Alexandra Mueller	6–3, 4–6, [7–10]
