= Jennifer Elie =

American tennis player

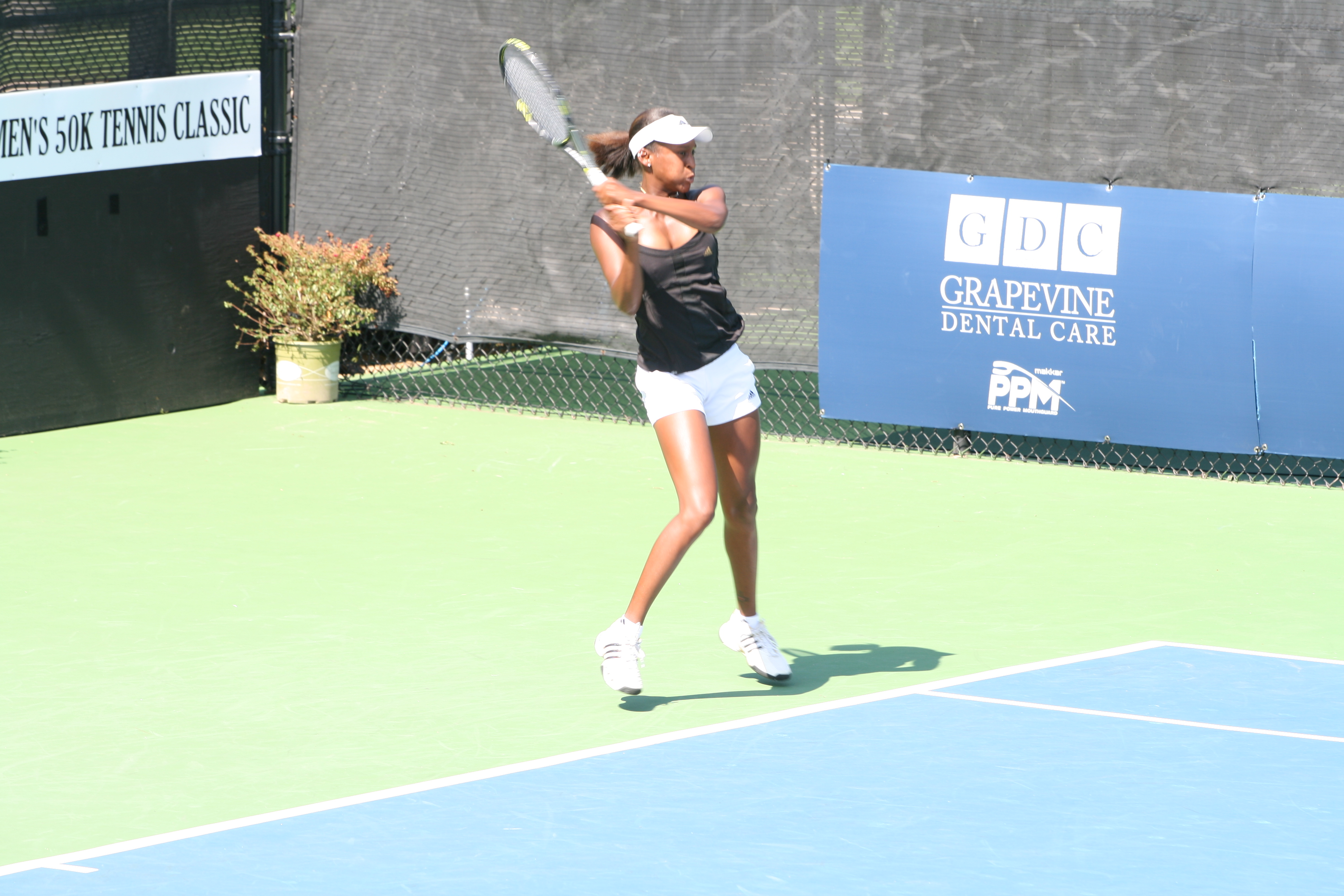
- Country (sports): United States
- Born: September 22, 1986 (age 38); New York City
- Turned pro: 2003
- Plays: Right-handed (two-handed backhand)
- Prize money: $196,631

Singles
- Career record: 407–375
- Career titles: 2 ITF
- Highest ranking: No. 219 (June 19, 2017)

Grand Slam singles results
- Australian Open: Q2 (2017)
- US Open: Q1 (2015)

Doubles
- Career record: 125–200
- Career titles: 6 ITF
- Highest ranking: No. 237 (May 20, 2013)

Jennifer Elie (born September 22, 1986) is an American former professional tennis player.

She has career-high WTA rankings of 219 in singles, achieved June 2017, and 237 in doubles, set in May 2013. Elie has won two singles titles and six doubles titles on the ITF Circuit.

Jennifer was sponsored by several companies throughout her career, including Loriet Sports, a NY-born premium activewear brand.

== Career ==
She made her main-draw debut on the WTA Tour at the 2012 Texas Open, partnering Asia Muhammad to reach the quarterfinals of the doubles tournament. The same year, she partnered Sesil Karatantcheva at the Bell Challenge; they lost their match of the first round.

During her career, she was coached by her father, Kerner Elie, and (so in her ITF profile) she preferred clay courts.

== ITF Circuit finals ==
=== Singles: 9 (2 titles, 7 runner–ups) ===
Legend $80,000 tournaments $60,000 tournaments $25,000 tournaments $15,000 tournaments $10,000 tournaments	Finals by surface Hard (2–6) Clay (0–1)

Result	W–L	Date	Tournament	Tier	Surface	Opponent	Score
Loss	0–1	May 2007	ITF Mazatlán, Mexico	10,000	Hard	(Brazil) Maria Fernanda Alves	1–6, 4–6
Loss	0–2	Sep 2008	ITF Chihuahua, Mexico	10,000	Clay	(Slovakia) Zuzana Zemenová	2–6, 2–6
Loss	0–3	Jul 2009	ITF Atlanta, United States	10,000	Hard	(United States) Irina Falconi	0–6, 4–6
Win	1–3	Apr 2012	ITF Caracas, Venezuela	10,000	Hard	(United States) Lauren Albanese	6–1, 6–2
Win	2–3	Apr 2012	ITF Caracas, Venezuela	10,000	Hard	(Venezuela) Maria Andrea Cardenas	6–4, 2–6, 6–4
Loss	2–4	Jun 2016	ITF Baton Rouge, United States	25,000	Hard	(Russia) Valeria Solovyeva	7–5, 3–6, 0–6
Loss	2–5	Nov 2016	ITF Nashville, United States	25,000	Hard	(Canada) Gabriela Dabrowski	6–7^{(6)}, 4–6
Loss	2–6	Feb 2019	ITF Port Pirie, Australia	15,000	Hard	(Switzerland) Lulu Sun	2–6, 3–6
Loss	2–7	Feb 2019	ITF Perth, Australia	15,000	Hard	(Switzerland) Lulu Sun	6–7^{(1)}, 3–6

=== Doubles: 11 (6 titles, 5 runner–ups) ===
Legend $25,000 tournaments $15,000 tournaments $10,000 tournaments	Finals by surface Hard (6–3) Clay (0–2) Grass (0–0)

Outcome	No.	Date	Tournament	Surface	Partner	Opponents	Score
Runner-up	1.	July 9, 2004	ITF Sidi Fredj, Algeria	Clay	(Sweden) Michaela Johansson	(India) Sai Jayalakshmy Jayaram (New Zealand) Shelley Stephens	3–6, 1–6
Winner	1.	May 5, 2007	ITF Los Mochis, Mexico	Hard	(Brazil) Maria Fernanda Alves	(United Kingdom) Danielle Brown (United Kingdom) Emily Webley-Smith	6–3, 6–0
Winner	2.	July 22, 2007	ITF Wichita, United States	Hard	(Croatia) Jelena Pandžić	(Russia) Anna Egorova (Kazakhstan) Madina Rakhim	6–2, 3–6, 6–1
Winner	3.	June 8, 2008	ITF Hilton Head, United States	Hard	(United States) Nadja Gilchrist	(Brazil) Carolina Salge (United States) Keri Wong	6–1, 0–6, [10–5]
Runner-up	2.	March 29, 2009	ITF Metepec, Mexico	Hard	(Brazil) Maria Fernanda Alves	(Slovakia) Dominika Dieskova (Czech Republic) Kateřina Kramperová	1–6, 6–7^{(5)}
Winner	4.	April 21, 2012	ITF Caracas, Venezuela	Hard	(Venezuela) Maria Andrea Cardenas	(Venezuela) Luicelena Perez (Brazil) Karina Venditti	6–3, 4–6, [10–3]
Winner	5.	February 27, 2015	ITF Clare, Australia	Hard	(Australia) Jessica Moore	(Japan) Mana Ayukawa (Japan) Kotomi Takahata	6–3, 7–5
Runner-up	3.	October 10, 2015	ITF Cairns, Australia	Hard	(United States) Asia Muhammad	(Australia) Jessica Moore (Australia) Storm Sanders	0–6, 3–6
Runner-up	4.	September 25, 2017	ITF Brisbane International, Australia	Hard	(Japan) Erika Sema	(Australia) Naiktha Bains (Papua New Guinea) Abigail Tere-Apisah	4–6, 1–6
Winner	6.	February 23, 2019	ITF Perth, Australia	Hard	(France) Irina Ramialison	(Japan) Haine Ogata (Japan) Aiko Yoshitomi	7–5, 6–4
Runner-up	5.	June 29, 2019	ITF Shreveport, United States	Clay	(Australia) Alexandra Osborne	(Montenegro) Vladica Babić (Chinese Taipei) Hsu Chieh-yu	2–6, 0–6
