= Jamie Loeb =

American tennis player (born 1995)

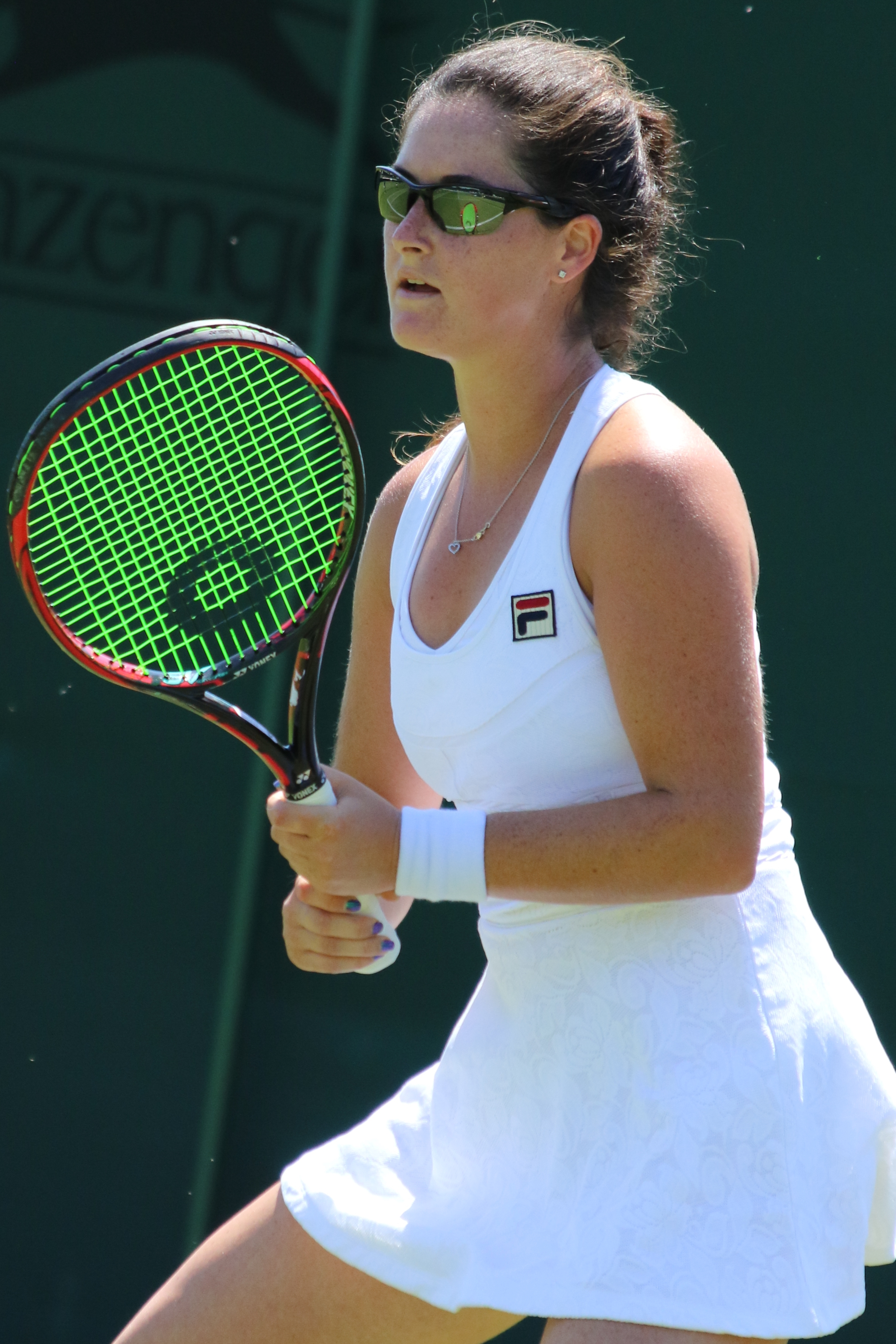
- Loeb at Wimbledon in 2018
- Country (sports): United States
- Residence: Ossining, New York, U.S.
- Born: March 8, 1995 (age 31) Bronxville, New York, U.S.
- Height: 1.68 m (5 ft 6 in)
- Turned pro: 2015
- Plays: Right (two-handed backhand)
- College: University of North Carolina (2013–15)
- Prize money: $828,044

Singles
- Career record: 316–277
- Career titles: 11 ITF
- Highest ranking: No. 132 (February 5, 2018)
- Current ranking: No. 522 (October 27, 2025)

Grand Slam singles results
- Australian Open: Q2 (2017)
- French Open: Q2 (2018)
- Wimbledon: Q3 (2017)
- US Open: 1R (2015, 2021)

Doubles
- Career record: 232–168
- Career titles: 18 ITF
- Highest ranking: No. 117 (July 3, 2023)
- Current ranking: No. 590 (October 27, 2025)

Grand Slam doubles results
- Wimbledon: Q1 (2018)
- US Open: 1R (2018, 2023)

Grand Slam mixed doubles results
- US Open: 1R (2017, 2018, 2021)
- Last updated on: October 28, 2025.

Jamie Loeb (born March 8, 1995) is an American tennis player. She has career-high WTA rankings of 132 in singles, achieved in February 2018, and 117 in doubles, achieved in July 2023. Loeb has won eleven singles and 18 doubles titles on the ITF Women's Circuit.

She won the New York State high-school title as a sophomore. Loeb won the singles and doubles U18s championships at the 2012 USTA National Winter Championship, and won the doubles at the 2013 USTA International Spring Championship. She attended the University of North Carolina for her freshman and sophomore years (2013–15), and won the singles NCAA Championship in 2015.

== Biography ==
Born in Bronxville, New York, Loeb was raised in Ossining, New York. Her parents are Jerry, who owns a butcher business, and Susan Loeb, who is a substitute teacher. She is the youngest of four siblings, and is Jewish. For middle school, she attended the Anne M. Dorner Middle School, while playing high school tennis.

== Career ==
Her mother, a tennis instructor, was her first coach. She began hitting tennis balls at Club Fit in Briarcliff at age five, and then at the Hardscrabble Club in Brewster at age seven, and by the age of 11, she was competing in national tournaments. She won a New York State title for Ossining High School as a sophomore, following in the footsteps of her sister Jenna who had won three. She finished her high school studies on-line.

She trained at the John McEnroe Tennis Academy at Randall’s Island where on occasion she hit with McEnroe.

Loeb won the singles and doubles 18s championships at the 2012 USTA National Winter Championship, won the doubles and finished runner-up in singles at the 2013 USTA International Spring Championship, and was a quarterfinalist at the 2013 Wimbledon Juniors.

Loeb attended the University of North Carolina for her freshman and sophomore years (2013–15), studying sports administration. She played tennis for the North Carolina Tar Heels, and became the first freshman in close to 30 years to win both the Riviera/ITA Women's All-American Championship (defeating Carol Zhao of Stanford in the final of the 2015 NCAA Division I Tennis Championships; making her the NCAA Women's Singles Tennis National Champion) and the USTA/ITA National Indoor Intercollegiate Championship. She was also the first singles national champion in UNC women's tennis history. After she won the national championship, the Village and Town of Ossining declared August 3 to be Jamie Loeb Day. In both her freshman and her sophomore seasons, she was named Atlantic Coast Conference (ACC) Player of the Year and ITA All American.

She then decided to compete in tennis as a professional, leaving UNC with an 84–9 career-record in singles competition.

Loeb won her biggest title to date at the 2015 Stockton Challenger in the doubles event, partnering Sanaz Marand. She received a wildcard for the 2015 US Open and played fourth seed Caroline Wozniacki in the first round, losing in straight sets. Loeb won two singles titles in 2016 at 25k tournaments in Surprise, Arizona, and El Paso, Texas.

She reached her first WTA 125 singles final at the 2021 LTP Women's Open, losing to Varvara Lepchenko in three sets.

Loeb received a main-draw wildcard for the 2023 US Open, partnering with Makenna Jones.

== Grand Slam performance timeline ==
Key
W	F	SF	QF	#R	RR	Q#	P#	DNQ	A	Z#	PO	G	S	B	NMS	NTI	P	NH

(W) winner; (F) finalist; (SF) semifinalist; (QF) quarterfinalist; (#R) rounds 4, 3, 2, 1; (RR) round-robin stage; (Q#) qualification round; (P#) preliminary round; (DNQ) did not qualify; (A) absent; (Z#) Davis/Fed Cup Zonal Group (with number indication) or (PO) play-off; (G) gold, (S) silver or (B) bronze Olympic/Paralympic medal; (NMS) not a Masters tournament; (NTI) not a Tier I tournament; (P) postponed; (NH) not held; (SR) strike rate (events won / competed); (W–L) win–loss record.
To avoid confusion and double counting, these charts are updated at the conclusion of a tournament or when the player's participation has ended.

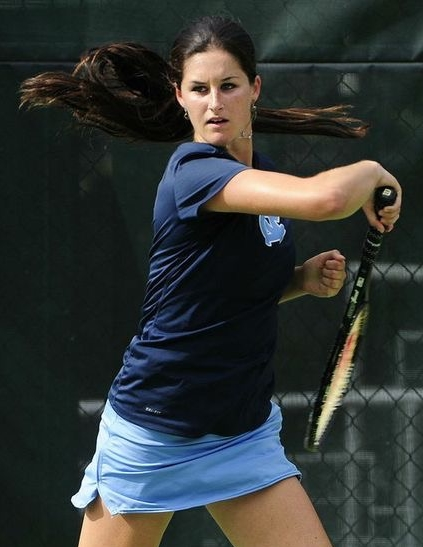
Loeb at UNC in 2013

== WTA Challenger finals ==
=== Singles: 1 (runner-up) ===
Result	W–L	Date	Tournament	Surface	Opponent	Score
Loss	0–1	Aug 2021	Charleston Pro, US	Clay	(United States) Varvara Lepchenko	6–7^{(4–7)}, 6–4, 4–6

=== Doubles: 2 (runner-ups) ===
Result	W–L	Date	Tournament	Surface	Partner	Opponents	Score
Loss	0–1	Jan 2018	Newport Beach Challenger, United States	Hard	(Sweden) Rebecca Peterson	(Japan) Misaki Doi (Switzerland) Jil Teichmann	6–7^{(4–7)}, 6–1, [8–10]
Loss	0–2	Sep 2019	New Haven Challenger, United States	Hard	(United States) Usue Maitane Arconada	(Russia) Anna Blinkova (Georgia (country)) Oksana Kalashnikova	2–6, 6–4, [4–10]

== ITF Circuit finals ==
=== Singles: 16 (11 titles, 5 runner-ups) ===
Legend W100 tournaments (0–1) W60 tournaments (1–1) W40/50 tournaments (1–0) W25/35 tournaments (6–3) W10 tournaments (3–0)	Finals by surface Hard (9–3) Clay (2–2)

Result	W–L	Date	Tournament	Tier	Surface	Opponent	Score
Win	1–0	Jun 2012	ITF Buffalo, United States	10,000	Clay	(United States) Tornado Alicia Black	7–6^{(5)}, 6–2
Win	2–0	Sep 2012	ITF Amelia Island, United States	10,000	Clay	(Japan) Mari Osaka	6–3, 7–5
Win	3–0	May 2013	ITF Sumter, United States	10,000	Hard	(United States) Brooke Austin	6–4, 6–3
Win	4–0	Jul 2015	ITF El Paso, United States	25,000	Hard	(United States) Jennifer Brady	6–7^{(7)}, 6–4, 6–2
Win	5–0	Feb 2016	ITF Surprise, United States	25,000	Hard	(United States) CiCi Bellis	3–6, 6–1, 6–3
Win	6–0	Jul 2016	ITF El Paso, United States	25,000	Hard	(United States) Caitlin Whoriskey	7–5, 6–3
Win	7–0	Feb 2017	Launceston International, Australia	60,000	Hard	(Slovenia) Tamara Zidanšek	7–6^{(4)}, 6–3
Loss	7–1	Oct 2017	ITF Templeton Pro, United States	60,000	Hard	(United States) Sachia Vickery	1–6, 2–6
Loss	7–2	Feb 2018	Midland Tennis Classic, US	100,000	Hard (i)	(United States) Madison Brengle	1–6, 2–6
Win	8–2	Oct 2019	ITF Dallas, United States	W25	Hard	(Ukraine) Anhelina Kalinina	6–0, 6–7^{(3)}, 6–0
Loss	8–3	May 2021	ITF Pelham, United States	W25	Clay	(Hungary) Panna Udvardy	7–6^{(5)}, 4–6, 3–6
Win	9–3	Jul 2022	ITF Figueira da Foz, Portugal	W25+H	Hard	(Australia) Kimberly Birrell	7–5, 6–4
Loss	9–4	Oct 2022	ITF Redding, United States	W25	Hard	(United States) Kayla Day	3–6, 4–6
Win	10–4	Jan 2023	ITF Malibu, United States	W25	Hard	(Mexico) Renata Zarazúa	6–4, 6–1
Win	11–4	Feb 2024	ITF Mexico City, Mexico	W50	Hard	(United States) Dalayna Hewitt	6–2, 6–2
Loss	11–5	Apr 2024	ITF Jackson, United States	W35	Clay	(United States) Katrina Scott	6–7^{(9)}, 6–7^{(6)}

=== Doubles: 37 (18 titles, 19 runner-ups) ===
Legend W100 tournaments (1–2) W80 tournaments (0–3) W50/60 tournaments (7–7) W25/35 tournaments (9–6) W10 tournaments (1–1)	Finals by surface Hard (12–18) Clay (6–1)

Result	W–L	Date	Tournament	Tier	Surface	Partner	Opponents	Score
Win	1–0	Jun 2012	ITF Buffalo, US	10,000	Clay	(Russia) Nika Kukharchuk	(Oman) Fatma Al-Nabhani (United States) Jacqueline Cako	1–6, 6–3, [10–8]
Loss	1–1	May 2013	ITF Sumter, US	10,000	Hard	(United States) Sanaz Marand	(United States) Kristy Frilling (United States) Alexandra Mueller	4–6, 3–6
Win	2–1	Jun 2014	ITF El Paso, US	25,000	Hard	(United States) Ashley Weinhold	(United States) Danielle Lao (Chinese Taipei) Hsu Chieh-yu	4–6, 6–4, [15–13]
Loss	2–2	Jul 2014	Vancouver Open, Canada	100,000	Hard	(United States) Allie Will	(United States) Asia Muhammad (United States) Maria Sanchez	3–6, 6–1, [8–10]
Win	3–2	Aug 2014	Landisville Challenge, US	25,000	Hard	(United States) Sanaz Marand	(United States) Lena Litvak (United States) Alexandra Mueller	7–6^{(5)}, 6–1
Win	4–2	Oct 2014	ITF Florence, US	25,000	Hard	(United States) Sanaz Marand	(United States) Danielle Lao (United States) Keri Wong	6–3, 7–6^{(5)}
Win	5–2	Jul 2015	Stockton Challenger, US	50,000	Hard	(United States) Sanaz Marand	(United States) Kaitlyn Christian (United States) Danielle Lao	6–3, 6–4
Loss	5–3	Jun 2016	ITF Sumter, US	25,000	Hard	(Canada) Carol Zhao	(United States) Ashley Weinhold (United States) Caitlin Whoriskey	6–7^{(5)}, 1–6
Loss	5–4	Jun 2016	ITF Baton Rouge, US	25,000	Hard	(United States) Ingrid Neel	(United States) Lauren Herring (Australia) Ellen Perez	3–6, 3–6
Loss	5–5	Jul 2016	Sacramento Challenger, US	50,000	Hard	(South Africa) Chanel Simmonds	(United States) Ashley Weinhold (United States) Caitlin Whoriskey	4–6, 4–6
Win	6–5	Aug 2016	Challenger de Granby, Canada	50,000	Hard	(Belgium) An-Sophie Mestach	(Israel) Julia Glushko (Belarus) Olga Govortsova	6–4, 6–4
Loss	6–6	Oct 2016	Las Vegas Open, US	50,000	Hard	(South Africa) Chanel Simmonds	(Netherlands) Michaëlla Krajicek (United States) Maria Sanchez	5–7, 1–6
Loss	6–7	Nov 2016	Tokyo Open, Japan	100,000	Hard	(Belgium) An-Sophie Mestach	(Japan) Rika Fujiwara (Japan) Yuki Naito	4–6, 7–6^{(12)}, [8–10]
Loss	6–8	Nov 2017	Tyler Pro Challenge, US	80,000	Hard	(Sweden) Rebecca Peterson	(United States) Jessica Pegula (United States) Taylor Townsend	4–6, 1–6
Loss	6–9	Apr 2018	Dothan Pro Classic, US	80,000	Clay	(United States) Sofia Kenin	(Chile) Alexa Guarachi (New Zealand) Erin Routliffe	4–6, 6–2, [9–11]
Win	7–9	May 2018	ITF La Bisbal d'Empordà, Spain	25,000	Clay	(Mexico) Ana Sofia Sanchez	(United States) Chiara Scholl (Spain) Yvonne Cavallé Reimers	6–3, 6–2
Win	8–9	Jul 2019	Championships of Honolulu, US	W60	Hard	(United States) Hayley Carter	(United States) Usue Maitane Arconada (United States) Caroline Dolehide	6–4, 6–4
Loss	8–10	Aug 2019	Lexington Challenger, US	W60	Hard	(United States) Ann Li	(United States) Robin Anderson (France) Jessika Ponchet	6–7^{(4)}, 7–6^{(5)}, [7–10]
Loss	8–11	Aug 2019	Landisville Tennis Challenge, US	W60	Hard	(United States) Hayley Carter	(United States) Vania King (United States) Claire Liu	6–4, 2–6, [5–10]
Win	9–11	Oct 2020	ITF Porto, Portugal	W25	Hard	(Mexico) Ana Sofia Sanchez	(Croatia) Jana Fett (New Zealand) Erin Routliffe	2–6, 6–3, [10–8]
Loss	9–12	Oct 2020	Tennis Classic of Macon, US	W80	Hard	(United States) Francesca Di Lorenzo	(Poland) Magdalena Fręch (Poland) Katarzyna Kawa	5–7, 1–6
Loss	9–13	Nov 2020	ITF Orlando, US	W25	Hard	(New Zealand) Erin Routliffe	(United States) Rasheeda McAdoo (United States) Alycia Parks	6–4, 1–6, [9–11]
Loss	9–14	Jul 2022	ITF Guimarães, Portugal	W25	Hard	(United Kingdom) Sarah Beth Grey	(Portugal) Francisca Jorge (Portugal) Matilde Jorge	3–6, 1–6
Loss	9–15	Sep 2022	Caldas da Rainha Open, Portugal	W60	Hard	(United States) Elysia Bolton	(United States) Adriana Reami (United States) Anna Rogers	4–6, 5–7
Win	10–15	Oct 2022	ITF Austin, US	W25	Hard	(Australia) Elysia Bolton	(Poland) Martyna Kubka (United States) Ashley Lahey	6–3, 6–3
Loss	10–16	Oct 2022	Toronto Challenger, Canada	W60	Hard (i)	(Australia) Elysia Bolton	(Czech Republic) Michaela Bayerlová (South Korea) Jang Su-jeong	3–6, 2–6
Loss	10–17	Mar 2023	ITF Fredericton, Canada	W25	Hard (i)	(United States) Quinn Gleason	(United States) Jessie Aney (United States) Dalayna Hewitt	6–7^{(2)}, 4–6
Win	11–17	Apr 2023	ITF Boca Raton, US	W25	Clay	(United States) Makenna Jones	(United States) Sofia Sewing (Hungary) Fanny Stollár	5–7, 6–3, [10–8]
Win	12–17	May 2023	Bonita Springs Championship, US	W100	Clay	(United States) Makenna Jones	(United States) Ashlyn Krueger (United States) Robin Montgomery	5–7, 6–4, [10–2]
Win	13–17	May 2023	ITF Pelham, US	W60	Clay	(United States) Makenna Jones	(United States) Robin Anderson (Australia) Elysia Bolton	6–4, 7–5
Win	14–17	Jun 2023	ITF Madrid, Spain	W60	Hard	(United States) Makenna Jones	(Australia) Destanee Aiava (Turkey) Berfu Cengiz	6–4, 5–7, [10–6]
Win	15–17	Jun 2023	ITF Tauste-Zaragoza, Spain	W25+H	Hard	(Australia) Elysia Bolton	(China) Gao Xinyu (Russia) Ekaterina Ovcharenko	6–2, 5–7, [10–6]
Loss	15–18	Jul 2023	Dallas Summer Series, US	W60	Hard (i)	(United States) Makenna Jones	(United States) Sophie Chang (United States) Ashley Lahey	2–6, 2–6
Win	16–18	Jan 2024	ITF Buenos Aires, Argentina	W35	Clay	(Mexico) Ana Sofía Sánchez	(Peru) Romina Ccuno (Russia) Daria Lodikova	7–5, 7–6^{(2)}
Win	17–18	Feb 2024	Georgia's Rome Open, US	W75	Hard (i)	(United States) Angela Kulikov	(United States) Hailey Baptiste (United States) Whitney Osuigwe	w/o
Loss	17–19	Sep 2024	ITF San Rafael, US	W35	Hard	(United States) Makenna Jones	(United States) Robin Anderson (United States) Alana Smith	5–7, 2–6
Win	18–19	Oct 2024	Toronto Challenger, Canada	W75	Hard (i)	(Lithuania) Justina Mikulskytė	(France) Julie Belgraver (Netherlands) Jasmijn Gimbrère	6–2, 6–1

== See also ==
- 2015 NCAA Division I Tennis Championships
- List of select Jewish tennis players
