= 2010 Soweto Open – Singles =

Singles
- 2010 Soweto Open

Final
- Champion: (Jamaica) Dustin Brown
- Runner-up: (South Africa) Izak van der Merwe
- Score: 7–6^{(7–2)}, 6–3

Events
| Singles | Doubles |
| ← 2009 · | Soweto Open | · 2011 → |

Fabrice Santoro was the defending champion, but chose not to compete this year.
Dustin Brown won in the final 7–6^{(7–2)}, 6–3 against Izak van der Merwe.

== Seeds ==
1. (Slovakia) Lukáš Lacko (first round)
2. (Slovakia) Karol Beck (first round)
3. (Chinese Taipei) Lu Yen-hsun (first round)
4. (Israel) Harel Levy (second round)
5. (Jamaica) Dustin Brown (champion)
6. (Switzerland) Stéphane Bohli (semifinals)
7. (Slovenia) Grega Žemlja (first round)
8. (Netherlands) Igor Sijsling (first round)

== Draw ==
=== Key ===
- Q = Qualifier
- WC = Wild card
- LL = Lucky loser
- Alt = Alternate
- SE = Special exempt
- PR = Protected ranking
- ITF = ITF entry
- JE = Junior exempt
- w/o = Walkover
- r = Retired
- d = Defaulted
- SR = Special ranking

=== Finals ===
Semifinals
5 | (Jamaica) Dustin Brown | 7 | 6
6 | (Switzerland) Stéphane Bohli | 6^{3} | 3
Q | (Austria) Alexander Peya | 6 | 3 | 6^{4}
(South Africa) Izak van der Merwe | 4 | 6 | 7

Final
5 | (Jamaica) Dustin Brown | 7 | 6
(South Africa) Izak van der Merwe | 6^{2} | 3

=== Top half ===
First round
1 | (Slovakia) L Lacko | 6 | 6^{2} | 3
(Belgium) R Bemelmans | 3 | 7 | 6
WC | (South Africa) R Klaasen | 2 | 6^{4}
(Netherlands) R Sluiter | 6 | 7
(Australia) S Groth | 0 | 6 | 6^{7}
Q | (Israel) N Okun | 6 | 1 | 7
(Czech Republic) J Minář | 2 | 1
5 | (Jamaica) D Brown | 6 | 6
3 | (Chinese Taipei) Y-h Lu | 6 | 6^{5} | 4
(France) N Mahut | 3 | 7 | 6
(Russia) K Kravchuk | 3 | 6 | 4
(Belgium) N Desein | 6 | 4 | 6
(Spain) A Menéndez Maceiras | 6^{5} | 7 | 6
Q | (United Kingdom) C Eaton | 7 | 6^{5} | 2
(Germany) S Stadler | 3 | 3
6 | (Switzerland) S Bohli | 6 | 6

Second round
(Belgium) R Bemelmans | 6^{5} | 6^{3}
(Netherlands) R Sluiter | 7 | 7
Q | (Israel) N Okun | 7 | 5 | 4
5 | (Jamaica) D Brown | 6^{4} | 7 | 6
(France) N Mahut | 6 | 4 | 6
(Belgium) N Desein | 3 | 6 | 3
(Spain) A Menéndez Maceiras | 3 | 2
6 | (Switzerland) S Bohli | 6 | 6

Quarterfinals
(Netherlands) R Sluiter | 4 | 6^{8}
5 | (Jamaica) D Brown | 6 | 7
(France) N Mahut | 0 | 5
6 | (Switzerland) S Bohli | 6 | 7

Semifinals
5 | (Jamaica) D Brown | 7 | 6
6 | (Switzerland) S Bohli | 6^{3} | 3

=== Bottom half ===
First round
7 | (Slovenia) G Žemlja | 6^{2} | 6 | 3
Q | (Ukraine) D Molchanov | 7 | 4 | 6
Q | (Austria) A Peya | 7 | 5 | 7
(Russia) E Kirillov | 6^{3} | 7 | 6^{4}
(Germany) M Bachinger | 3 | 6^{4}
(Luxembourg) G Müller | 6 | 7
WC | (South Africa) R de Voest | 6^{4} | 4
4 | (Israel) H Levy | 7 | 6
8 | (Netherlands) I Sijsling | 3 | 2
WC | (South Africa) N Scholtz | 6 | 6
(South Africa) I van der Merwe | 7 | 6
WC | (South Africa) R Roelofse | 5 | 3
(New Zealand) D King-Turner | 6 | 6
(Spain) D Muñoz-De La Nava | 2 | 3
(Sweden) F Prpic | 6 | 6
2 | (Slovakia) K Beck | 2 | 4

Second round
Q | (Ukraine) D Molchanov | 4 | 5
Q | (Austria) A Peya | 6 | 7
(Luxembourg) G Müller | 6 | 7
4 | (Israel) H Levy | 3 | 5
WC | (South Africa) N Scholtz | 3 | 3
(South Africa) I van der Merwe | 6 | 6
(New Zealand) D King-Turner | 6 | 6
(Sweden) F Prpic | 2 | 4

Quarterfinals
Q | (Austria) A Peya | 1 | 6 | 6
(Luxembourg) G Müller | 6 | 3 | 3
(South Africa) I van der Merwe | 6 | 6
(New Zealand) D King-Turner | 4 | 1

Semifinals
Q | (Austria) A Peya | 6 | 3 | 6^{6}
(South Africa) I van der Merwe | 4 | 6 | 7
