= 2013 Soweto Open =

Professional tennis tournament in Johannesburg, South Africa

- Date: 29 April – 5 May; 6–12 May
- Edition: 4th
- Draw: 32S / 16D
- Prize money: $100,000+H $50,000+H
- Surface: Hard
- Location: Johannesburg, South Africa

Champions

Men's singles
- (Canada) Vasek Pospisil

Women's singles
- (Hungary) Tímea Babos

Men's doubles
- (India) Prakash Amritraj / (United States) Rajeev Ram

Women's doubles
- (Poland) Magda Linette / (South Africa) Chanel Simmonds
← 2011 ·	Soweto Open	· 2014 →

The 2013 Soweto Open was a professional tennis tournament played on hard courts. It was the fourth edition of the tournament which was part of the 2013 ATP Challenger Tour and the 2013 ITF Women's Circuit. It took place in Johannesburg, South Africa, on 29 April – 5 May 2013 for the men's event and 6–12 May 2013 for the women's event.

== ATP singles main-draw entrants ==
=== Seeds ===
Country	Player	Rank^{1}	Seed
SVK	Lukáš Lacko	79	1
USA	Rajeev Ram	115	2
CAN	Vasek Pospisil	130	3
POL	Michał Przysiężny	152	4
GER	Dustin Brown	180	5
BRA	Thiago Alves	186	6
RSA	Rik de Voest	204	7
BRA	Fabiano de Paula	261	8

- ^{1} Rankings as of 22 April 2013

=== Other entrants ===
The following players received wildcards into the singles main draw:

- (South Africa) Wayne Montgomery
- (South Africa) Ruan Roelofse
- (South Africa) Tucker Vorster
- (South Africa) Dean O'Brien

The following players received entry using protected rankings:

- (India) Prakash Amritraj
- (Germany) Richard Becker

The following players received entry from the qualifying draw:

- (Brazil) Rafael Camilo
- (United States) Tyler Hochwalt
- (India) Purav Raja
- (India) Divij Sharan

The following player received entry as a lucky loser:

- (Botswana) Phenyo Matong

== ATP doubles main-draw entrants ==
=== Seeds ===
Country	Player	Country	Player	Rank^{1}	Seed
RSA	Rik de Voest	BRA	Marcelo Demoliner	223	1
IND	Purav Raja	IND	Divij Sharan	225	2
CRO	Mate Pavić	MNE	Goran Tošić	258	3
GER	Dustin Brown	IRL	James Cluskey	288	4

- ^{1} Rankings as of 22 April 2013

=== Other entrants ===
The following pairs received wildcards into the doubles main draw:

- (South Africa) Francois Kellerman / (South Africa) Okkie Kellerman
- (South Africa) Renier Moolman / (South Africa) Dean O'Brien
- (South Africa) Keith-Patrick Crowley / (South Africa) Tucker Vorster

== WTA singles main-draw entrants ==
=== Seeds ===
Country	Player	Rank^{1}	Seed
HUN	Tímea Babos	114	1
ISR	Julia Glushko	161	2
SLO	Tadeja Majerič	165	3
UKR	Nadiia Kichenok	172	4
RSA	Chanel Simmonds	181	5
SRB	Jovana Jakšić	253	6
GBR	Samantha Murray	254	7
POL	Magda Linette	263	8

- ^{1} Rankings as of 29 April 2013

=== Other entrants ===
The following players received wildcards into the singles main draw:

- (South Africa) Madrie le Roux
- (South Africa) Zanmarie Pienaar
- (South Africa) Ilze Hattingh
- (South Africa) Natasha Fourouclas

The following players received entry from the qualifying draw:

- (Israel) Julia Glushko
- (Bulgaria) Ani Vangelova
- (Italy) Claudia Coppola
- (Zimbabwe) Fadzai Mawisire

== WTA doubles main-draw entrants ==
=== Seeds ===
Country	Player	Country	Player	Rank^{1}	Seed
POL	Magda Linette	RSA	Chanel Simmonds	415	1
TUR	Başak Eraydın	ISR	Julia Glushko	432	2
SRB	Teodora Mirčić	TUR	Pemra Özgen	487	3
UKR	Nadiia Kichenok	RUS	Margarita Lazareva	505	4

== Champions ==
=== Men's singles ===
- (Canada) Vasek Pospisil def. (Poland) Michał Przysiężny 6–7^{(7–9)}, 6–0, 4–1, retired

=== Women's singles ===
- (Hungary) Tímea Babos def. (South Africa) Chanel Simmonds 6–7^{(3–7)}, 6–4, 6–1

=== Men's doubles ===
- (India) Prakash Amritraj / (United States) Rajeev Ram def. (India) Purav Raja / (India) Divij Sharan 7–6^{(7–1)}, 7–6^{(7–1)}

=== Women's doubles ===
- (Poland) Magda Linette / (South Africa) Chanel Simmonds def. (United Kingdom) Samantha Murray / (United Kingdom) Jade Windley 6–1, 6–3
