= 2010 Soweto Open – Doubles =

Doubles
- 2010 Soweto Open

Final
- Champions: (France) Nicolas Mahut (Croatia) Lovro Zovko
- Runners-up: (South Africa) Raven Klaasen (South Africa) Izak van der Merwe
- Score: 6–2, 6–2

Events
Singles	Doubles
← 2009 ·	Soweto Open	· 2011 →

George Bastl and Chris Guccione were the reigning champions; however, Bastl retired in 2009 and Guccione chose to participate in Baton Rouge instead.
Nicolas Mahut and Lovro Zovko won in the final 6–2, 6–2 against Raven Klaasen and Izak van der Merwe.

== Seeds ==
1. (United Kingdom) Jonathan Marray / (United Kingdom) Jamie Murray (quarterfinals)
2. (Thailand) Sanchai Ratiwatana / (Thailand) Sonchat Ratiwatana (semifinals)
3. (France) Nicolas Mahut / (Croatia) Lovro Zovko (champion)
4. (Israel) Jonathan Erlich / (Israel) Harel Levy (quarterfinals)

== Draw ==
=== Key ===
- Q = Qualifier
- WC = Wild card
- LL = Lucky loser
- Alt = Alternate
- SE = Special exempt
- PR = Protected ranking
- ITF = ITF entry
- JE = Junior exempt
- w/o = Walkover
- r = Retired
- d = Defaulted
- SR = Special ranking

=== Draw ===
First round
1	(United Kingdom) J Marray (United Kingdom) J Murray	2	6	[10]
(South Africa) R de Voest (Chinese Taipei) Y-h Lu	6	0	[8]
(Luxembourg) G Müller (Austria) A Peya	6	6
(Germany) M Bachinger (Slovenia) G Žemlja	2	2
4	(Israel) J Erlich (Israel) H Levy	6	6
WC	(South Africa) H Pieters (South Africa) BJ van Rensburg	1	3
(Jamaica) D Brown (Germany) S Stadler	3	6^{7}
WC	(South Africa) R Klaasen (South Africa) I van der Merwe	6	7
WC	(South Africa) R Roelofse (South Africa) N Scholtz	7	3	[16]
(United Kingdom) C Eaton (United Kingdom) D Inglot	6^{5}	6	[14]
(Belgium) R Bemelmans (Belgium) N Desein	5	7	[3]
3	(France) N Mahut (Croatia) L Zovko	7	5	[10]
(Slovakia) K Beck (Slovakia) L Lacko	7	1	[5]
(Netherlands) I Sijsling (Netherlands) R Sluiter	6^{2}	6	[10]
(Switzerland) S Bohli (Australia) S Groth	2	2
2	(Thailand) Sa Ratiwatana (Thailand) So Ratiwatana	6	6

Quarterfinals
1	(United Kingdom) J Marray (United Kingdom) J Murray	6^{5}	2
(Luxembourg) G Müller (Austria) A Peya	7	6
4	(Israel) J Erlich (Israel) H Levy	4	6^{4}
WC	(South Africa) R Klaasen (South Africa) I van der Merwe	6	7
WC	(South Africa) R Roelofse (South Africa) N Scholtz	2	3
3	(France) N Mahut (Croatia) L Zovko	6	6
(Netherlands) I Sijsling (Netherlands) R Sluiter	2	5
2	(Thailand) Sa Ratiwatana (Thailand) So Ratiwatana	6	7

Semifinals
(Luxembourg) G Müller (Austria) A Peya	2	1
WC	(South Africa) R Klaasen (South Africa) I van der Merwe	6	6
3	(France) N Mahut (Croatia) L Zovko	6	6
2	(Thailand) Sa Ratiwatana (Thailand) So Ratiwatana	3	2

Finals
WC	(South Africa) R Klaasen (South Africa) I van der Merwe	2	2
3	(France) N Mahut (Croatia) L Zovko	6	6
