= Magda Linette career statistics =

Career finals
Discipline	Type	Won	Lost	Total
Singles	Grand Slam	–	–	–
Singles	WTA Finals	–	–	–
Singles	WTA 1000	–	–	–
Singles	WTA 500	–	–	–
Singles	WTA 250	–	–	–
Singles	Olympics	–	–	–
Singles	Total	0	0	0
Doubles	Grand Slam	–	–	–
Doubles	WTA Finals	–	–	–
Doubles	WTA 1000	–	–	–
Doubles	WTA 500	–	–	–
Doubles	WTA 250	–	–	–
Doubles	Olympics	–	–	–
Doubles	Total	0	0	0

This is a list of career statistics of Polish tennis player Magda Linette.

== Performance timelines ==
Key
W	F	SF	QF	#R	RR	Q#	DNQ	A	NH

(W) winner; (F) finalist; (SF) semifinalist; (QF) quarterfinalist; (#R) rounds 4, 3, 2, 1; (RR) round-robin stage; (Q#) qualification round; (DNQ) did not qualify; (A) absent; (NH) not held; (SR) strike rate (events won / competed); (W–L) win–loss record.
To avoid confusion and double counting, these charts are updated at the conclusion of a tournament or when the player's participation has ended.

Only main-draw results in WTA Tour, Grand Slam tournaments, Billie Jean King Cup, United Cup, Hopman Cup and Olympic Games are included in win–loss records.

=== Singles ===
Current through the 2026 US Open.

Tournament	2011	2012	2013	2014	2015	2016	2017	2018	2019	2020	2021	2022	2023	2024	2025	2026	SR	W–L	Win %
Grand Slam tournaments
Australian Open	A	A	A	Q2	Q1	1R	1R	3R	1R	1R	A	2R	SF	1R	1R	3R	0 / 10	10–10	50%
French Open	Q2	A	A	Q1	1R	1R	3R	1R	2R	1R	3R	2R	1R	1R	1R	3R	0 / 12	8–12	40%
Wimbledon	Q1	A	Q1	Q1	1R	1R	1R	1R	3R	NH	3R	2R	3R	1R	1R	1R	0 / 11	7–11	39%
US Open	Q1	A	Q1	Q1	2R	1R	1R	1R	2R	3R	1R	1R	2R	1R	1R	1R	0 / 12	5–12	29%
Win–loss	0–0	0–0	0–0	0–0	1–3	0–4	2–4	2–4	4–4	2–3	4–3	3–4	8–4	0–4	0–4	4–4	0 / 45	30–45	40%
Year-end championships
WTA Elite Trophy	DNQ									NH			RR	NH			0 / 1	0–2	0%
National representation
Summer Olympics	NH	A	NH			1R	NH				1R	NH		2R	NH		0 / 3	1–3	25%
Billie Jean King Cup (Note: Formerly known as Fed Cup until 2020.)	POZ1	A	A	A	A	WG2	POZ1	Z1	Z1	PO (Note: Edition is split into the two years due to COVID-19.)		RR	RR	SF	PO		0 / 3	13–12	52%
WTA 1000 tournaments
Qatar Open	NTI	A	A	A	NTI	Q1	NTI	A	NTI	1R	NTI	2R	NTI	2R	3R	2R	0 / 5	5–5	50%
Dubai Championships	A	NTI			A	NTI	A	NTI	A	NTI	A	NTI	A	1R	1R	3R	0 / 3	2–3	40%
Indian Wells Open	A	A	A	Q1	A	Q1	2R	1R	2R	NH	2R	1R	2R	1R	2R	1R	0 / 9	4–9	31%
Miami Open	A	A	A	Q1	A	3R	1R	1R	Q2	NH	2R	2R	4R	1R	QF	3R	0 / 9	12–9	57%
Madrid Open	A	A	A	A	A	A	Q1	Q2	Q1	NH	1R	Q2	3R	2R	2R	2R	0 / 5	3–5	38%
Italian Open	A	A	A	A	A	A	A	Q1	Q1	2R	1R	A	3R	2R	3R	1R	0 / 6	4–6	40%
Canadian Open	A	A	A	A	Q2	1R	Q1	A	Q1	NH	1R	A	1R	2R	2R	2R	0 / 6	2–6	25%
Cincinnati Open	A	A	A	A	A	Q1	1R	Q1	Q2	1R	1R	Q2	1R	2R	4R	1R	0 / 7	3–7	30%
China Open	A	A	A	Q1	Q2	Q1	1R	Q1	1R	NH			3R	4R	2R		0 / 5	4–5	44%
Wuhan Open	Not Held			A	Q2	A	3R	Q1	A	Not Held				QF	1R		0 / 3	5–3	63%
Guadalajara Open	Not Held											1R	A	Not Tier I			0 / 1	0–1	0%
Win–loss	0–0	0–0	0–0	0–0	0–0	2–2	3–5	0–2	1–2	1–3	2–6	2–4	6–7	10–10	11–10	7–8	0 / 59	45–59	43%
Career statistics
	2011	2012	2013	2014	2015	2016	2017	2018	2019	2020	2021	2022	2023	2024	2025	2026	SR	W–L	Win %
Tournaments	0 (Note: During the season, she did not play in the main draw of any tour-level tournaments. However, she played at the Billie Jean King Cup, which is not counted as a played tournament but matches counted.)	0	2	4	11	16	23	18	19	12	17	22	28	27	25	13	Career total: 185		
Titles	0	0	0	0	0	0	0	0	1	1	0	0	0	1	0	0	Career total: 3		
Finals	0	0	0	0	1	0	0	0	2	1	0	1	1	2	0	0	Career total: 7		
Hard win–loss	1–3	0–0	3–1	2–4	8–8	10–14	12–16	15–12	20–12	12–8	9–10	16–14	19–19	12–17	14–17	13–10	2 / 165	166–165	50%
Clay win–loss	0–0	0–0	1–1	0–0	0–1	0–1	6–5	2–5	2–5	2–3	5–6	6–4	4–7	16–7	3–4	1–2	0 / 51	48–51	48%
Grass win–loss	0–0	0–0	0–0	0–0	1–2	0–3	1–3	0–2	2–2	NH	2–1	4–4	4–3	1–3	3–4		0 / 27	18–27	40%
Overall win–loss	1–3	0–0	4–2	2–4	9–11	10–18	19–24	17–19	24–19	14–11	16–17	26–22	27–29	29–27	21–25	14–13	2 / 246	233–244	49%
Year-end ranking (Note: 2009: WTA ranking–1008, 2010: WTA ranking–194.)	248	296	148	117	89	96	71	83	42	40	57	49	22	38	55		$8,580,318		

=== Doubles ===
Current through the 2024 WTA Tour.

Tournament	2010	...	2013	2014	2015	2016	2017	2018	2019	2020	2021	2022	2023	2024	SR	W–L	Win %
Grand Slam tournaments
Australian Open	A		A	A	A	1R	2R	2R	1R	1R	A	3R	1R	A	0 / 7	4–7	36%
French Open	A		A	A	2R	2R	2R	1R	A	2R	SF	1R	A	2R	0 / 8	9–8	53%
Wimbledon	A		A	A	1R	A	1R	A	1R	NH	1R	1R	2R	2R	0 / 7	2–7	22%
US Open	A		A	A	1R	1R	A	3R	2R	A	2R	1R	QF	2R	0 / 8	8–8	50%
Win–loss	0–0		0–0	0–0	1–3	1–3	2–3	3–3	1–3	1–2	5–3	2–4	4–3	3–3	0 / 30	23–30	43%
National representation
Summer Olympics	NH		NH			A	NH				1R	NH		1R	0 / 2	0–2	0%
WTA 1000 tournaments
Qatar Open	A		A	A	NTI	A	NTI	A	NTI	1R	NTI	A	NTI	A	0 / 1	0–1	0%
Dubai Championships	A		NTI		A	NTI	A	NTI	A	NTI	A	NTI	A	1R	0 / 1	0–1	0%
Indian Wells Open	A		A	A	A	A	A	A	A	NH	A	2R	QF	2R	0 / 3	4–3	57%
Miami Open	A		A	A	A	A	A	A	A	NH	A	QF	SF	1R	0 / 3	5–3	63%
Madrid Open	A		A	A	A	A	A	A	A	NH	A	A	1R	1R	0 / 2	0–2	0%
Italian Open	A		A	A	A	A	A	A	A	QF	A	A	2R	1R	0 / 3	3–3	50%
Canadian Open	A		A	A	A	A	A	A	A	NH	SF	A	2R	2R	0 / 3	5–3	63%
Cincinnati Open	A		A	A	A	A	A	A	A	1R	1R	1R	1R	2R	0 / 5	1–5	17%
Wuhan Open	NH		NH	A	A	A	A	A	A	NH				A	0 / 0	0–0	–
China Open	A		A	1R	1R	A	A	1R	A	NH			SF	A	0 / 4	3–4	43%
Career statistics
Tournaments	1		4	5	11	6	8	7	5	8	8	11	5	16	Career total: 95		
Titles	0		0	0	0	0	0	0	0	0	0	2	0	0	Career total: 2		
Finals	0		0	1	0	1	1	0	0	0	0	2	0	0	Career total: 5		
Overall win–loss	0–1		2–4	4–5	7–11	4–6	6–8	5–7	1–5	4–8	11–7	11–11	6–4	12–14	2 / 95	73–92	44%
Year-end ranking	136		116	155	116	192	139	136	411	161	56	45	42	75			

== WTA Tour finals ==
=== Singles: 9 (4 Titles, 5 Runner - Up) ===
Legend International / WTA 250 (4–5)	Finals by surface Hard (3–4) Clay (1–1)	Finals by setting Outdoor (3–4) Indoor (0–1)

Result	W–L	Date	Tournament	Tier	Surface	Opponent	Score
Loss	0–1	Sep 2015	Japan Women's Open, Japan	International	Hard	(Belgium) Yanina Wickmayer	6–4, 3–6, 3–6
Win	1–1	Aug 2019	Bronx Open, United States	International	Hard	(Italy) Camila Giorgi	5–7, 7–5, 6–4
Loss	1–2	Sep 2019	Korea Open, South Korea	International	Hard	(Czech Republic) Karolína Muchová	1–6, 1–6
Win	2–2	Feb 2020	Hua Hin Championships, Thailand	International	Hard	(Switzerland) Leonie Küng	6–3, 6–2
Loss	2–3	Sep 2022	Chennai Open, India	WTA 250	Hard	(Czech Republic) Linda Fruhvirtová	6–4, 3–6, 4–6
Loss	2–4	Sep 2023	Guangzhou Open, China	WTA 250	Hard	(China) Wang Xiyu	0–6, 2–6
Loss	2–5	Apr 2024	Open de Rouen, France	WTA 250	Clay (i)	(United States) Sloane Stephens	1–6, 6–2, 2–6
Win	3–5	Jul 2024	Prague Open, Czech Republic	WTA 250	Clay	(Poland) Magdalena Fręch	6–2, 6–1
Win	4–5	Nov 2026	Chennai Open, India	WTA 250	Hard	(Indonesia) Janice Tjen	5–7, 6–1, 6–4

=== Doubles: 5 (2 titles, 3 runner-ups) ===
Legend WTA 500 (2–0) International (0–3)	Finals by surface Hard (0–2) Clay (1–1) Grass (1–0)	Finals by setting Outdoor (2–3)

Result	W–L	Date	Tournament	Tier	Surface	Partner	Opponents	Score
Loss	0–1	Sep 2014	Guangzhou International, China	International	Hard	(France) Alizé Cornet	(Chinese Taipei) Chuang Chia-jung (China) Liang Chen	6–2, 6–7^{(3)}, [7–10]
Loss	0–2	Oct 2016	Tianjin Open, China	International	Hard	(China) Xu Yifan	(United States) Christina McHale (China) Peng Shuai	6–7^{(8)}, 0–6
Loss	0–3	Apr 2017	Copa Colsanitas, Colombia	International	Clay	(Paraguay) Verónica Cepede Royg	(Brazil) Beatriz Haddad Maia (Argentina) Nadia Podoroska	3–6, 6–7^{(4)}
Win	1–3	Apr 2022	Charleston Open, United States	WTA 500	Clay	(Slovenia) Andreja Klepač	(Czech Republic) Lucie Hradecká (India) Sania Mirza	6–2, 4–6, [10–7]
Win	2–3	Jun 2022	Eastbourne International, UK	WTA 500	Grass	(Serbia) Aleksandra Krunić	(Ukraine) Lyudmyla Kichenok (Latvia) Jeļena Ostapenko	w/o

== WTA 125 finals ==
=== Singles: 3 (1 title, 2 runner-ups) ===
Result	W–L	Date	Tournament	Surface	Opponent	Score
Win	1–0	Oct 2014	Ningbo Open, China	Hard	(China) Wang Qiang	3–6, 7–5, 6–1
Loss	1–1	Jun 2018	Bol Ladies Open, Croatia	Clay	(Slovenia) Tamara Zidanšek	1–6, 3–6
Loss	1–2	Oct 2022	Abierto Tampico, Mexico	Hard	(Italy) Elisabetta Cocciaretto	6–7^{(5–7)}, 6–4, 1–6

== ITF Circuit finals ==
=== Singles: 21 (11 titles, 10 runner-ups) ===
Legend
$100,000 tournaments (2–1)
$50,000 tournaments (0–2)
$25,000 tournaments (8–6)
$10,000 tournaments (1–1)

Result	W–L	Date	Tournament	Tier	Surface	Opponent	Score
Win	1–0	Jun 2010	ITF Szczecin, Poland	25,000	Clay	(Estonia) Margit Rüütel	6–2, 6–0
Loss	1–1	Jun 2010	Bella Cup Toruń, Poland	25,000	Clay	(Russia) Ksenia Pervak	4–6, 1–6
Win	2–1	Aug 2010	Ladies Open Hechingen, Germany	25,000	Clay	(Spain) Sílvia Soler Espinosa	7–5, 3–6, 6–2
Win	3–1	Aug 2010	Reinert Open Versmold, Germany	25,000	Clay	(Romania) Irina-Camelia Begu	6–2, 7–5
Win	4–1	Sep 2010	ITF Katowice, Poland	25,000	Clay	(Czech Republic) Eva Birnerová	3–6, 6–2, 6–2
Loss	4–2	Sep 2010	Zagreb Ladies Open, Croatia	25,000	Clay	(Czech Republic) Renata Voráčová	1–6, 6–4, 4–6
Loss	4–3	Nov 2010	ITF Opole, Poland	25,000	Carpet (i)	(Czech Republic) Sandra Záhlavová	7–5, 6–7^{(4)}, 4–6
Loss	4–4	May 2012	ITF Florence, Italy	10,000	Clay	(France) Anaïs Laurendon	4–6, 4–6
Loss	4–5	Jun 2012	ITF Kristinehamn, Sweden	25,000	Clay	(Australia) Sacha Jones	4–6, 4–6
Win	5–5	Sep 2012	ITF Prague, Czech Republic	10,000	Clay	(Slovakia) Zuzana Luknárová	6–2, 7–6^{(7)}
Loss	5–6	Apr 2013	ITF Civitavecchia, Italy	25,000	Clay	(Slovakia) Anna Karolína Schmiedlová	0–6, 1–6
Loss	5–7	Oct 2013	Open Nantes Atlantique, France	50,000+H	Hard	(Belarus) Aliaksandra Sasnovich	6–4, 4–6, 2–6
Win	6–7	Dec 2013	ITF Pune, India	25,000	Hard	(Kazakhstan) Kamila Kerimbayeva	7–5, 7–6^{(5)}
Loss	6–8	Dec 2013	ITF Navi Mumbai, India	25,000	Hard	(Japan) Rika Fujiwara	6–2, 6–7^{(5)}, 6–7^{(4)}
Win	7–8	Oct 2014	ITF Goyang, South Korea	25,000	Hard	(Czech Republic) Renata Voráčová	6–3, 3–6, 6–3
Win	8–8	Feb 2015	Open de l'Isère, France	25,000	Hard (i)	(Czech Republic) Tereza Martincová	7–6^{(2)}, 4–6, 6–1
Win	9–8	Feb 2015	ITF New Delhi, India	25,000	Hard	(Slovenia) Tadeja Majerič	6–1, 6–1
Loss	9–9	Jun 2015	Ilkley Trophy, UK	50,000	Grass	(Germany) Anna-Lena Friedsam	7–5, 3–6, 1–6
Win	10–9	May 2016	Open de Cagnes-sur-Mer, France	100,000	Clay	(Germany) Carina Witthöft	6–3, 7–5
Win	11–9	Jun 2019	Manchester Trophy, UK	W100	Grass	(Kazakhstan) Zarina Diyas	7–6^{(1)}, 2–6, 6–3
Loss	11–10	Aug 2022	Kozerki Open, Poland	W100	Hard	(Czech Republic) Kateřina Siniaková	4–6, 1–6

=== Doubles: 17 (8 titles, 9 runner-ups) ===
Legend
$50,000 tournaments (4–2)
$25,000 tournaments (4–6)
$10,000 tournaments (0–1)

Result	W–L	Date	Tournament	Tier	Surface	Partner	Opponents	Score
Loss	0–1	Nov 2010	ITF Opole, Poland	25,000	Carpet (i)	(Poland) Paula Kania	(Georgia (country)) Oksana Kalashnikova (Belarus) Polina Pekhova	3–6, 4–6
Loss	0–2	Apr 2011	ITF Casablanca, Morocco	25,000	Clay	(Poland) Katarzyna Piter	(Austria) Sandra Klemenschits (France) Kristina Mladenovic	3–6, 6–3, [8–10]
Loss	0–3	May 2011	Internazionale di Roma, Italy	50,000	Clay	(Romania) Liana Ungur	(Australia) Sophie Ferguson (Australia) Sally Peers	w/o
Loss	0–4	Sep 2011	Save Cup Mestre, Italy	50,000	Clay	(Hungary) Tímea Babos	(Ukraine) Valentyna Ivakhnenko (Russia) Marina Melnikova	4–6, 5–7
Loss	0–5	Nov 2011	ITF Opole, Poland	25,000	Carpet (i)	(Poland) Paula Kania	(United Kingdom) Naomi Broady (France) Kristina Mladenovic	6–7^{(5)}, 4–6
Win	1–5	Jun 2012	ITF Ystad, Sweden	25,000	Clay	(Poland) Katarzyna Piter	(Georgia (country)) Oksana Kalashnikova (Slovakia) Lenka Wienerová	6–3, 6–3
Loss	1–6	Sep 2012	ITF Prague, Czech Rep.	10,000	Clay	(Czech Republic) Kateřina Kramperová	(United Kingdom) Lucy Brown (Italy) Angelica Moratelli	3–6, 7–5, [6–10]
Win	2–6	Oct 2012	Open de Limoges, France	50,000	Hard (i)	(Poland) Sandra Zaniewska	(France) Irena Pavlovic (Switzerland) Stefanie Vögele	6–1, 5–7, [10–5]
Win	3–6	Nov 2012	ITF Équeurdreville, France	25,000	Hard (i)	(Poland) Katarzyna Piter	(Switzerland) Amra Sadiković (Croatia) Ana Vrljić	6–4, 7–6^{(4)}
Win	4–6	Dec 2012	Ankara Cup, Turkey	50,000	Hard	(Poland) Katarzyna Piter	(Ukraine) Irina Buryachok (Russia) Valeria Solovyeva	6–2, 6–2
Loss	4–7	Apr 2013	ITF Civitavecchia, Italy	25,000	Clay	(Poland) Paula Kania	(Liechtenstein) Stephanie Vogt (Czech Republic) Renata Voráčová	3–6, 4–6
Win	5–7	May 2013	Soweto Open, South Africa	50,000	Hard	(South Africa) Chanel Simmonds	(United Kingdom) Samantha Murray (United Kingdom) Jade Windley	6–1, 6–3
Win	6–7	May 2013	Maribor Open, Slovenia	25,000	Clay	(Poland) Paula Kania	(Argentina) Mailen Auroux (Argentina) María Irigoyen	6–3, 6–0
Win	7–7	Jul 2013	Bella Cup Toruń, Poland	25,000	Clay	(Poland) Paula Kania	(Ukraine) Yuliya Beygelzimer (Romania) Elena Bogdan	6–2, 4–6, [10–5]
Loss	7–8	Sep 2013	GB Pro-Series Loughborough, UK	25,000	Hard	(Czech Republic) Tereza Smitková	(Turkey) Çağla Büyükakçay (Turkey) Pemra Özgen	2–6, 7–5, [6–10]
Win	8–8	Oct 2013	Open de Limoges, France	50,000	Hard (i)	(Switzerland) Viktorija Golubic	(Italy) Nicole Clerico (Czech Republic) Nikola Fraňková	6–4, 6–4
Loss	8–9	Mar 2014	ITF Edgbaston, UK	25,000	Hard (i)	(Switzerland) Amra Sadiković	(United Kingdom) Jocelyn Rae (United Kingdom) Anna Smith	6–3, 5–7, [4–10]

== Best Grand Slam results details ==
=== Singles ===
	Australian Open	
2023 Australian Open
Round	Opponent	Score
1R	(Egypt) Mayar Sherif	7–5, 6–1
2R	(Estonia) Anett Kontaveit (16)	3–6, 6–3, 6–4
3R	Ekaterina Alexandrova (19)	6–3, 6–4
4R	(France) Caroline Garcia (4)	7–6^{(7–3)}, 6–4
QF	(Czech Republic) Karolína Plíšková (30)	6–3, 7–5
SF	Aryna Sabalenka (5)	6–7^{(1–7)}, 2–6

	French Open	
2017 French Open
Round	Opponent	Score
1R	(France) Alizé Lim (WC)	6–0, 7–5
2R	(Croatia) Ana Konjuh (29)	6–0, 7–5
3R	(Ukraine) Elina Svitolina (5)	4–6, 5–7
2021 French Open
Round	Opponent	Score
1R	(France) Chloé Paquet (WC)	6–3, 6–3
2R	(Australia) Ashleigh Barty (1)	6–1, 2–2 ret.
3R	(Tunisia) Ons Jabeur (25)	6–3, 0–6, 1–6

	Wimbledon	
2019 Wimbledon
Round	Opponent	Score
1R	(Russia) Anna Kalinskaya (Q)	6–0, 7–6^{(11–9)}
2R	(United States) Amanda Anisimova (25)	6–4, 7–5
3R	(Czech Republic) Petra Kvitová (6)	3–6, 2–6
2021 Wimbledon
Round	Opponent	Score
1R	(United States) Amanda Anisimova	2–6, 6–3, 6–1
2R	(Ukraine) Elina Svitolina (3)	6–3, 6–4
3R	(Spain) Paula Badosa (30)	7–5, 2–6, 4–6
2023 Wimbledon (23rd seed)
Round	Opponent	Score
1R	(Switzerland) Jil Teichmann	6–3, 6–2
2R	(Czech Republic) Barbora Strýcová (PR)	6–4, 6–7^{(6–8)}, 6–3
3R	(Switzerland) Belinda Bencic (14)	3–6, 1–6

	US Open	
2020 US Open (24th seed)
Round	Opponent	Score
1R	(Australia) Maddison Inglis	6–1, 4–6, 6–4
2R	(Montenegro) Danka Kovinić	6–1, 6–7^{(2–7)}, 7–6^{(7–4)}
3R	(Estonia) Anett Kontaveit	3–6, 2–6

== Wins against top 10 players ==
Season	2021	2022	2023	2024	2025	2026	Total
Wins	2	1	1	1	2	1	8

No.	Player	Rk	Event	Surface	Rd	Score	Rk	Years	Ref
1	(Australia) Ashleigh Barty	1	French Open, France	Clay	2R	6–1, 2–2 ret.	45	2021	
2	(Ukraine) Elina Svitolina	5	Wimbledon, UK	Grass	2R	6–3, 6–4	44	2021	
3	(Tunisia) Ons Jabeur	6	French Open, France	Clay	1R	3–6, 7–6^{(7–4)}, 7–5	52	2022	
4	(France) Caroline Garcia	4	Australian Open, Australia	Hard	4R	7–6^{(7–3)}, 6–4	45	2023	
5	(Italy) Jasmine Paolini	5	China Open, China	Hard	3R	6–4, 6–0	45	2024	
6	(United States) Coco Gauff	3	Miami Open, US	Hard	4R	6–4, 6–4	34	2025	
7	(United States) Jessica Pegula	4	Cincinnati Open, US	Hard	3R	7–6^{(7–5)}, 3–6, 6–3	40	2025	
8	(Poland) Iga Świątek	3	Miami Open, US	Hard	2R	1–6, 7–5, 6–3	50	2026	

- Key: (Rk) first use, opponent rank; (Rd) round; (Rk) 2nd use, player rank; (Ref) reference; (F) final; (SF) semifinal; (QF) quarterfinal; (#R) rounds 4, 3, 2, 1; (RR) round-robin stage; (Q#) qualifying rounds or stages (3), 2, 1.
