= 2011 Soweto Open – Women's doubles =

Women's doubles
- 2011 Soweto Open
- 2010 Champions: (Russia) Vitalia Diatchenko (Greece) Irini Georgatou

Events
| Singles | men | women |
| Doubles | men | women |
| ← 2010 · | Soweto Open | · 2012 → |

Vitalia Diatchenko and Irini Georgatou were the defending champions but Diatchenko decided not to participate.
Georgatou played alongside Oksana Kalashnikova, but lost in the Quarterfinals to Nina Bratchikova and Valeria Savinykh.
Unfortunately, all semifinal matches were cancelled by the supervisor, due to heavy rain and flooding.

== Seeds ==
1. (Czech Republic) Eva Birnerová / (Czech Republic) Petra Cetkovská (semifinals)
2. (United States) Megan Moulton-Levy / (Germany) Kathrin Wörle (first round)
3. (Thailand) Noppawan Lertcheewakarn / (Australia) Jessica Moore (first round)
4. (Russia) Nina Bratchikova / (Russia) Valeria Savinykh (semifinals)

== Draw ==
=== Key ===
- Q = Qualifier
- WC = Wild card
- LL = Lucky loser
- Alt = Alternate
- SE = Special exempt
- PR = Protected ranking
- ITF = ITF entry
- JE = Junior exempt
- w/o = Walkover
- r = Retired
- d = Defaulted
- SR = Special ranking

=== Draw ===
First round
1 | (Czech Republic) E Birnerová (Czech Republic) P Cetkovská | 6 | 6
(United States) B Augustine (United States) A Muhammed | 0 | 0
WC | (South Africa) N Fourouclas (South Africa) I Hattingh | 1 | 1
(United Kingdom) N Broady (United Kingdom) E Webley-Smith | 6 | 6
3 | (Thailand) N Lertcheewakarn (Australia) J Moore | 6 | 2 | [9]
WC | (South Africa) S de Beer (South Africa) C Simmonds | 2 | 6 | [11]
(Germany) K Grajdek (Poland) J Jegiołka | 1 | 4
(Brazil) A-C Duarte (Serbia) T Mirčić | 6 | 6
WC | (South Africa) SL de Plessis (South Africa) T Edwards | 1 | 1
(Greece) I Georgatou (Georgia (country)) O Kalashnikova | 6 | 6
(France) A Laurendon (Luxembourg) M Minella | 4 | 2
4 | (Russia) N Bratchikova (Russia) V Savinykh | 6 | 6
(Italy) C Dentoni (United Kingdom) K O'Brien | 5 | 3
(Luxembourg) A Kremer (Austria) N Rottmann | 7 | 6
(Netherlands) K Bertens (United Kingdom) A Keothavong | 7 | 7
2 | (United States) M Moulton-Levy (Germany) K Wörle | 5 | 6^{5}

Quarterfinals
1 | (Czech Republic) E Birnerová (Czech Republic) P Cetkovská | 6 | 6
(United Kingdom) N Broady (United Kingdom) E Webley-Smith | 4 | 4
WC | (South Africa) S de Beer (South Africa) C Simmonds | 6 | 4 | [18]
(Brazil) A-C Duarte (Serbia) T Mirčić | 4 | 6 | [20]
(Greece) I Georgatou (Georgia (country)) O Kalashnikova | 4 | 0
4 | (Russia) N Bratchikova (Russia) V Savinykh | 6 | 6
(Luxembourg) A Kremer (Austria) N Rottmann | 3 | 6 | [4]
(Netherlands) K Bertens (United Kingdom) A Keothavong | 6 | 2 | [10]

Semifinals
1 | (Czech Republic) E Birnerová (Czech Republic) P Cetkovská
(Brazil) A-C Duarte (Serbia) T Mirčić
4 | (Russia) N Bratchikova (Russia) V Savinykh
(Netherlands) K Bertens (United Kingdom) A Keothavong

Final
