= 2013 Soweto Open – Men's singles =

Men's singles
- 2013 Soweto Open

Final
- Champion: (Canada) Vasek Pospisil
- Runner-up: (Poland) Michał Przysiężny
- Score: 6–7^{(7–9)}, 6–0, 4–1 ret.

Events
Singles	men	women
Doubles	men	women
← 2011 ·	Soweto Open	· 2014 →

The defending champion from 2011 was Izak van der Merwe, as there was no event in 2012. He is not entered in this year's event.
Vasek Pospisil defeated Michał Przysiężny while leading 6–7^{(7–9)}, 6–0, 4–1 in the final before Przysiężny retired.

== Seeds ==
1. (Slovakia) Lukáš Lacko (semifinals)
2. (United States) Rajeev Ram (quarterfinals)
3. (Canada) Vasek Pospisil (champion)
4. (Poland) Michał Przysiężny (final, retired)
5. (Germany) Dustin Brown (quarterfinals)
6. (Brazil) Thiago Alves (second round)
7. (South Africa) Rik de Voest (quarterfinals)
8. (Brazil) Fabiano de Paula (second round)

== Main draw ==
=== Key ===
- Q = Qualifier
- WC = Wild card
- LL = Lucky loser
- Alt = Alternate
- SE = Special exempt
- PR = Protected ranking
- ITF = ITF entry
- JE = Junior exempt
- w/o = Walkover
- r = Retired
- d = Defaulted
- SR = Special ranking

=== Finals ===
Semifinals
1	(Slovakia) Lukáš Lacko	3	6^{4}
4	(Poland) Michał Przysiężny	6	7^{7}
3	(Canada) Vasek Pospisil	6	7^{8}
(Croatia) Mate Pavić	3	6^{6}

Final
4	(Poland) Michał Przysiężny	7^{9}	0	1^{r}
3	(Canada) Vasek Pospisil	6^{7}	6	4

=== Top half ===
First round
1	(Slovakia) L Lacko	6	6
(Brazil) R Hocevar	4	2
(Czech Republic) Michal Konečný	6	4	6
(France) G Burquier	2	6	2
(Montenegro) G Tošić	1	6^{6}
WC	(South Africa) D O'Brien	6	7^{8}
(France) F Martin	6^{3}	6^{5}
8	(Brazil) F de Paula	7^{7}	7^{7}
4	(Poland) M Przysiężny	6	7
(United States) D Zivkovic	3	5
(Brazil) M Demoliner	4	7^{7}	7^{7}
WC	(South Africa) T Vorster	6	6^{2}	6^{4}
WC	(South Africa) Keith-Patrick Crowley	4	5
(Brazil) A Ghem	6	7
Q	(United States) Tyler Hochwalt	5	1
5	(Germany) D Brown	7	6

Second round
1	(Slovakia) L Lacko	6	6
(Czech Republic) M Konečný	1	1
WC	(South Africa) D O'Brien	7^{7}	6^{5}	7^{7}
8	(Brazil) F de Paula	6^{2}	7^{7}	6^{4}
4	(Poland) M Przysiężny	6	6
(Brazil) M Demoliner	2	0
(Brazil) A Ghem	4	4
5	(Germany) D Brown	6	6

Quarterfinals
1	(Slovakia) L Lacko	6	6
WC	(South Africa) D O'Brien	3	3
4	(Poland) M Przysiężny	6	7^{7}
5	(Germany) D Brown	3	6^{1}

Semifinals
1	(Slovakia) L Lacko	3	6^{4}
4	(Poland) M Przysiężny	6	7^{7}

=== Bottom half ===
First round
7	(South Africa) R de Voest	6	6
PR	(Germany) R Becker	4	4
(Brazil) T Turini	3	4
(Germany) Stefan Seifert	6	6
Q	(India) P Raja	3	4
(South Africa) J Andersen	6	6
Q	(India) D Sharan	2	4
3	(Canada) V Pospisil	6	6
6	(Brazil) T Alves	7	6
Q	(Brazil) Rafael Camilo	5	3
PR	(India) P Amritraj	7^{7}	4	4
(Croatia) M Pavić	6^{4}	6	6
WC	(South Africa) Wayne Montgomery	6	2	6
LL	(Botswana) Phenyo Matong	1	6	3
(South Africa) R Roelofse	7^{7}	3	4
2	(United States) R Ram	6^{4}	6	6

Second round
7	(South Africa) R de Voest	6	6
(Germany) S Seifert	3	0
(South Africa) J Andersen	2	6	1
3	(Canada) V Pospisil	6	3	6
6	(Brazil) T Alves	2	2
(Croatia) M Pavić	6	6
WC	(South Africa) W Montgomery	4	2
2	(United States) R Ram	6	6

Quarterfinals
7	(South Africa) R de Voest	3	6	4
3	(Canada) V Pospisil	6	0	6
(Croatia) M Pavić	7^{7}	7
2	(United States) R Ram	6^{4}	5

Semifinals
3	(Canada) V Pospisil	6	7^{8}
(Croatia) M Pavić	3	6^{6}
