= 2011 Soweto Open – Women's singles =

Women's singles
- 2011 Soweto Open

Final
- Champion: (Russia) Valeria Savinykh
- Runner-up: (Czech Republic) Petra Cetkovská
- Score: 6–1, 6–3

Events
Singles	men	women
Doubles	men	women
← 2010 ·	Soweto Open	· 2012 →

Nina Bratchikova was the defending champion, but lost in the Quarterfinals to Kathrin Wörle.
Valeria Savinykh defeated Petra Cetkovská in the final, 6–1, 6–3.

== Seeds ==
1. (United Kingdom) Anne Keothavong (semifinals)
2. (Czech Republic) Petra Cetkovská (final)
3. (Russia) Nina Bratchikova (quarterfinals)
4. (Czech Republic) Eva Birnerová (first round)
5. (Luxembourg) Mandy Minella (first round)
6. (Luxembourg) Anne Kremer (first round)
7. (Italy) Corinna Dentoni (quarterfinals)
8. (Germany) Kathrin Wörle (semifinals)

== Draw ==
=== Key ===
- Q = Qualifier
- WC = Wild card
- LL = Lucky loser
- Alt = Alternate
- SE = Special exempt
- PR = Protected ranking
- ITF = ITF entry
- JE = Junior exempt
- w/o = Walkover
- r = Retired
- d = Defaulted
- SR = Special ranking

=== Finals ===
Semifinals
1	(United Kingdom) Anne Keothavong	3	0^{r}
(Russia) Valeria Savinykh	6	3
8	(Germany) Kathrin Wörle	2	1
2	(Czech Republic) Petra Cetkovská	6	6

Final
(Russia) Valeria Savinykh	6	6
2	(Czech Republic) Petra Cetkovská	1	3

=== Top half ===
First round
1	(United Kingdom) A Keothavong	7	4	6
Q	(United States) A Muhammed	6^{4}	6	3
WC	(South Africa) N Fourouclas	4	3
Q	(Serbia) T Mirčić	6	6
(Greece) I Georgatou	6	6
(Poland) J Jegiołka	2	2
(Turkey) Ç Büyükakçay	6	2	6
6	(Luxembourg) A Kremer	3	6	2
4	(Czech Republic) E Birnerová	6	3	2
(Russia) V Savinykh	2	6	6
(Georgia (country)) O Kalashnikova	6	6
WC	(South Africa) M Le Roux	2	1
WC	(Madagascar) Z Razafimahatratra	6	6
WC	(South Africa) L Kiro	4	2
Q	(Belgium) G de Wael	2	1
7	(Italy) C Dentoni	6	6

Second round
1	(United Kingdom) A Keothavong	6	7
Q	(Serbia) T Mirčić	3	6^{4}
(Greece) I Georgatou	6	4	6
(Turkey) Ç Büyükakçay	2	6	4
(Russia) V Savinykh	6	6
(Georgia (country)) O Kalashnikova	2	2
WC	(Madagascar) Z Razafimahatratra	3	0
7	(Italy) C Dentoni	6	6

Quarterfinals
1	(United Kingdom) A Keothavong	7	3	6
(Greece) I Georgatou	6^{3}	6	3
(Russia) V Savinykh	6	6
7	(Italy) C Dentoni	4	3

Semifinals
1	(United Kingdom) A Keothavong	3	0^{r}
(Russia) V Savinykh	6	3

=== Bottom half ===
First round
8	(Germany) K Wörle	3	7	6
(Thailand) N Luangnam	6	5	4
(United Kingdom) N Broady	4	4
(United Kingdom) E Webley-Smith	6	6
(Australia) J Moore	4	0
(United Kingdom) L Whybourn	6	6
(South Africa) C Simmonds	2	1
3	(Russia) N Bratchikova	6	6
5	(Luxembourg) M Minella	6	3	6^{7}
(Brazil) A-C Duarte	4	6	7
Q	(Germany) K Grajdek	5	6^{4}
(Netherlands) K Bertens	7	7
(United Kingdom) K O'Brien	4	7	0
(Thailand) N Lertcheewakarn	6	6^{3}	6
(France) A Laurendon	3	3
2	(Czech Republic) P Cetkovská	6	6

Second round
8	(Germany) K Wörle	7	7
(United Kingdom) E Webley-Smith	5	6^{2}
(United Kingdom) L Whybourn	7	3	1
3	(Russia) N Bratchikova	5	6	6
(Brazil) A-C Duarte	1	3
(Netherlands) K Bertens	6	6
(Thailand) N Lertcheewakarn	4	1
2	(Czech Republic) P Cetkovská	6	6

Quarterfinals
8	(Germany) K Wörle	7	6
3	(Russia) N Bratchikova	6^{5}	4
(Netherlands) K Bertens	6^{4}	2
2	(Czech Republic) P Cetkovská	7	6

Semifinals
8	(Germany) K Wörle	2	1
2	(Czech Republic) P Cetkovská	6	6
