= 2016 Fed Cup Europe/Africa Zone Group I – Pool B =

Pool B of the 2016 Fed Cup Europe/Africa Zone Group I was one of four pools in the Europe/Africa zone of the 2016 Fed Cup. Four teams competed in a round robin competition, with the top team and the bottom team proceeding to their respective sections of the play-offs: the top team played for advancement to the World Group II Play-offs, while the bottom team faced potential relegation to Group II.

== Standings ==
		(United Kingdom) GBR	(Georgia (country)) GEO	(South Africa) RSA	RR; W–L	Set; W–L	Game; W–L	Standings
23	Great Britain		2–1	3–0	2–0	10–2	66–34	1
34	Georgia	1–2		3–0	1–1	8–4	58–53	2
43	South Africa	0–3	0–3		0–2	0–12	37–74	3

== Round-robin ==
=== Georgia vs. South Africa ===
Georgia
3
Municipal Tennis Centre, Eilat, Israel
3 February 2016
Hard (outdoors)

South Africa
0

			1	2	3
1	(Georgia (country)) (South Africa)	Ekaterine Gorgodze; Madrie Le Roux	6; 3	6; 1
2	(Georgia (country)) (South Africa)	Sofia Shapatava; Chanel Simmonds	7; 5	6; 4
3	(Georgia (country)) (South Africa)	Ekaterine Gorgodze / Oksana Kalashnikova; Ilze Hattingh / Michelle Sammons	6; 4	7^{8} 6^{6}

=== Great Britain vs. South Africa ===
Great Britain
3
Municipal Tennis Centre, Eilat, Israel
4 February 2016
Hard (outdoors)

South Africa
0

			1	2	3
1	(United Kingdom) (South Africa)	Katie Swan; Ilze Hattingh	6; 3	6; 0
2	(United Kingdom) (South Africa)	Heather Watson; Chanel Simmonds	6; 3	6; 3
3	(United Kingdom) (South Africa)	Jocelyn Rae / Anna Smith; Madrie Le Roux / Michelle Sammons	6; 3	6; 2

=== Great Britain vs. Georgia ===
Great Britain
2
Municipal Tennis Centre, Eilat, Israel
5 February 2016
Hard (outdoors)

Georgia
1

			1	2	3
1	(United Kingdom) (Georgia (country))	Katie Swan; Ekaterine Gorgodze	6; 3	6; 3
2	(United Kingdom) (Georgia (country))	Heather Watson; Sofia Shapatava	6; 2	6; 0
3	(United Kingdom) (Georgia (country))	Jocelyn Rae / Anna Smith; Oksana Kalashnikova / Sofia Shapatava	2; 6	4; 6
