= 2013 Soweto Open – Men's doubles =

Men's doubles
- 2013 Soweto Open

Final
- Champions: (India) Prakash Amritraj (United States) Rajeev Ram
- Runners-up: (India) Purav Raja (India) Divij Sharan
- Score: 7–6^{(7–1)}, 7–6^{(7–1)}

Events
| Singles | men | women |
| Doubles | men | women |
| ← 2011 · | Soweto Open | · 2014 → |

The defending champions from 2011 were Michael Kohlmann and Alexander Peya, as there was no event in 2012. They chose not to participate.

Prakash Amritraj and Rajeev Ram defeated Purav Raja and Divij Sharan 7–6^{(7–1)}, 7–6^{(7–1)} in the final to win the title.

== Seeds ==
1. (South Africa) Rik de Voest / (Brazil) Marcelo Demoliner (quarterfinals)
2. (India) Purav Raja / (India) Divij Sharan (final)
3. (Croatia) Mate Pavić / (Montenegro) Goran Tošić (semifinals)
4. (Germany) Dustin Brown / (Republic of Ireland) James Cluskey (first round)

== Draw ==
=== Key ===
- Q = Qualifier
- WC = Wild card
- LL = Lucky loser
- Alt = Alternate
- SE = Special exempt
- PR = Protected ranking
- ITF = ITF entry
- JE = Junior exempt
- w/o = Walkover
- r = Retired
- d = Defaulted
- SR = Special ranking

=== Draw ===
First round
1 | (South Africa) R de Voest (Brazil) M Demoliner | 6 | 6
WC | (South Africa) Francois Kellerman (South Africa) Okkie Kellerman | 0 | 2
(India) P Amritraj (United States) R Ram | 6 | 6
(Brazil) T Alves (Brazil) A Laranja | 1 | 3
3 | (Croatia) M Pavić (Montenegro) G Tošić | 6^{3} | 6 | [10]
(Brazil) A Ghem (Brazil) R Hocevar | 7^{7} | 3 | [7]
WC | (South Africa) Keith-Patrick Crowley (South Africa) T Vorster | 6^{4} | 6 | [4]
(Germany) R Becker (France) F Martin | 7^{7} | 4 | [10]
(France) G Burquier (Czech Republic) Michal Konečný | 4 | 6^{4}
(Netherlands) S Groen (Slovakia) L Lacko | 6 | 7^{7}
(Poland) M Przysiężny (United States) D Zivkovic | 6 | 7^{8}
4 | (Germany) D Brown (Republic of Ireland) J Cluskey | 3 | 6^{6}
(Brazil) F de Paula (Brazil) T Turini | 6 | 7^{8}
WC | (South Africa) Renier Moolman (South Africa) D O'Brien | 1 | 6^{6}
(South Africa) J Andersen (South Africa) R Roelofse | 3 | 4
2 | (India) P Raja (India) D Sharan | 6 | 6

Quarterfinals
1 | (South Africa) R de Voest (Brazil) M Demoliner | 5 | 4
(India) P Amritraj (United States) R Ram | 7 | 6
3 | (Croatia) M Pavić (Montenegro) G Tošić | 7^{7} | 6
(Germany) R Becker (France) F Martin | 6^{5} | 3
(Netherlands) S Groen (Slovakia) L Lacko | 1 | 4
(Poland) M Przysiężny (United States) D Zivkovic | 6 | 6
(Brazil) F de Paula (Brazil) T Turini | 3 | 6^{3}
2 | (India) P Raja (India) D Sharan | 6 | 7^{7}

Semifinals
(India) P Amritraj (United States) R Ram | 6 | 2 | [10]
3 | (Croatia) M Pavić (Montenegro) G Tošić | 3 | 6 | [5]
(Poland) M Przysiężny (United States) D Zivkovic | 4 | 4
2 | (India) P Raja (India) D Sharan | 6 | 6

Final
(India) P Amritraj (United States) R Ram | 7^{7} | 7^{7}
2 | (India) P Raja (India) D Sharan | 6^{1} | 6^{1}
