= 2011 Soweto Open – Men's doubles =

Men's doubles
- 2011 Soweto Open

Final
- Champions: (Germany) Michael Kohlmann (Austria) Alexander Peya
- Runners-up: (Germany) Andre Begemann (Australia) Matthew Ebden
- Score: 6–2, 6–2

Events
Singles	men	women
Doubles	men	women
← 2010 ·	Soweto Open	· 2012 →

Nicolas Mahut and Lovro Zovko were the defending champions but decided not to participate.
All semifinal matches had been cancelled by the supervisor, due to heavy rain and flooding. This event was reinstated at players request.
Michael Kohlmann and Alexander Peya won the title, defeating Andre Begemann and Matthew Ebden 6–2, 6–2 in the final.

== Seeds ==
1. (United States) James Cerretani / (Canada) Adil Shamasdin (quarterfinals)
2. (Germany) Michael Kohlmann / (Austria) Alexander Peya (champions)
3. (Thailand) Sanchai Ratiwatana / (Thailand) Sonchat Ratiwatana (quarterfinals)
4. (Germany) Dustin Brown / (South Africa) Raven Klaasen (semifinals)

== Draw ==
=== Key ===
- Q = Qualifier
- WC = Wild card
- LL = Lucky loser
- Alt = Alternate
- SE = Special exempt
- PR = Protected ranking
- ITF = ITF entry
- JE = Junior exempt
- w/o = Walkover
- r = Retired
- d = Defaulted
- SR = Special ranking

=== Draw ===
First round
1	(United States) J Cerretani (Canada) A Shamasdin	6	6
(Ukraine) S Bubka (Slovakia) A Martin	4	4
(Australia) G Jones (United States) R Ram	6	6
WC	(South Africa) Renier Moolman (South Africa) N Scholtz	2	3
3	(Thailand) Sa Ratiwatana (Thailand) So Ratiwatana	6	7
(Poland) M Kowalczyk (Poland) M Przysiężny	4	5
(Germany) A Begemann (Australia) M Ebden	5	7	[10]
WC	(Thailand) D Udomchoke (Israel) A Weintraub	7	6^{1}	[7]
(South Africa) R de Voest (South Africa) I van der Merwe	6	6
(United Kingdom) C Eaton (Ukraine) D Molchanov	1	3
WC	(South Africa) J Coetzee (South Africa) R Roelofse	6^{5}	4
4	(Germany) D Brown (South Africa) R Klaasen	7	6
(Germany) S Rieschick (Germany) S Stadler	6	6
(Belgium) R Bemelmans (Russia) E Kirillov	3	2
(Luxembourg) G Müller (France) L Walter	6	4	[8]
2	(Germany) M Kohlmann (Austria) A Peya	4	6	[10]

Quarterfinals
1	(United States) J Cerretani (Canada) A Shamasdin	4	6	[2]
(Australia) G Jones (United States) R Ram	6	3	[10]
3	(Thailand) Sa Ratiwatana (Thailand) So Ratiwatana	6	3	[7]
(Germany) A Begemann (Australia) M Ebden	4	6	[10]
(South Africa) R de Voest (South Africa) I van der Merwe	6^{6}	3
4	(Germany) D Brown (South Africa) R Klaasen	7	6
(Germany) S Rieschick (Germany) S Stadler	6^{7}	4
2	(Germany) M Kohlmann (Austria) A Peya	7	6

Semifinals
(Australia) G Jones (United States) R Ram	3	6^{6}
(Germany) A Begemann (Australia) M Ebden	6	7
4	(Germany) D Brown (South Africa) R Klaasen	6^{7}	6	[3]
2	(Germany) M Kohlmann (Austria) A Peya	7	4	[10]

Final
(Germany) A Begemann (Australia) M Ebden	2	2
2	(Germany) M Kohlmann (Austria) A Peya	6	6
