= 2017 Fed Cup Europe/Africa Zone Group II – Pool A =

Subsection of tennis competition

Group A of the 2017 Fed Cup Europe/Africa Zone Group II was one of 2 pools in the Europe/Africa zone of the 2017 Fed Cup. Four teams competed in a round robin competition, with the top two teams and the bottom two teams proceeding to their respective sections of the play-offs: the top two teams played for advancement to Group I, while the bottom two teams faced potential relegation to Group III.

== Standings ==
		SLO	SWE	NOR	RSA	RR; W–L	Set; W–L	Game; W–L	Standings
80	Slovenia		3–0	1–2	3–0	2–1	15–7 (68%)	110–82 (57%)	1
50	Sweden	0–3		3–0	3–0	2–1	14–7 (67%)	106–73 (59%)	2
68	Norway	2–1	0–3		3–0	2–1	10–9 (53%)	80–78 (51%)	3
61	South Africa	0–3	0–3	0–3		0–3	2–18 (10%)	53–116 (31%)	4

Standings are determined by: 1. number of wins; 2. if two teams have the same number of wins, head-to-head record; 3. if three teams have the same number of wins, (a) number of matches won in the group, then (b) percentage of sets won in the group, then (c) percentage of games won in the group, then (d) Fed Cup rankings.

== Round-robin ==
=== Sweden vs. Slovenia ===
Sweden
0
Šiauliai Tennis School, Šiauliai, Lithuania
19 April 2017
Hard (indoors)

Slovenia
3

			1	2	3
1	(Sweden) (Slovenia)	Cornelia Lister; Dalila Jakupović	2; 6	6; 4	3; 6
2	(Sweden) (Slovenia)	Johanna Larsson; Tamara Zidanšek	3; 6	6; 3	3; 6
3	(Sweden) (Slovenia)	Jacqueline Cabaj Awad / Kajsa Rinaldo Persson; Kaja Juvan / Andreja Klepač	3; 6	5; 7

=== South Africa vs. Norway ===
South Africa
0
Šiauliai Tennis School, Šiauliai, Lithuania
19 April 2017
Hard (indoors)

Norway
3

			1	2	3
1	(South Africa) (Norway)	Ilze Hattingh; Malene Helgø	1; 6	1; 6
2	(South Africa) (Norway)	Chanel Simmonds; Ulrikke Eikeri	3; 6	1; 6
3	(South Africa) (Norway)	Madrie Le Roux / Chanel Simmonds; Astrid Wanja Brune Olsen / Caroline Rohde-Moe	6^{1} 7^{7}	4; 6

=== Sweden vs. Norway ===
Sweden
3
Šiauliai Tennis School, Šiauliai, Lithuania
20 April 2017
Hard (indoors)

Norway
0

			1	2	3
1	(Sweden) (Norway)	Cornelia Lister; Malene Helgø	6; 4	6; 0
2	(Sweden) (Norway)	Johanna Larsson; Ulrikke Eikeri	6; 0	6; 2
3	(Sweden) (Norway)	Jacqueline Cabaj Awad / Kajsa Rinaldo Persson; Astrid Wanja Brune Olsen / Malene Helgø	6; 2	6; 2

=== South Africa vs. Slovenia ===
South Africa
0
Šiauliai Tennis School, Šiauliai, Lithuania
20 April 2017
Hard (indoors)

Slovenia
3

			1	2	3
1	(South Africa) (Slovenia)	Ilze Hattingh; Dalila Jakupović	1; 6	3; 6
2	(South Africa) (Slovenia)	Chanel Simmonds; Tamara Zidanšek	4; 6	2; 6
3	(South Africa) (Slovenia)	Ilze Hattingh / Madrie Le Roux; Dalila Jakupović / Andreja Klepač	2; 6	6; 4	0; 6

=== Sweden vs. South Africa ===
Sweden
3
Šiauliai Tennis School, Šiauliai, Lithuania
21 April 2017
Hard (indoors)

South Africa
0

			1	2	3
1	(Sweden) (South Africa)	Cornelia Lister; Ilze Hattingh	3; 6	6; 2	6; 3
2	(Sweden) (South Africa)	Johanna Larsson; Chanel Simmonds	6; 1	6; 1
3	(Sweden) (South Africa)	Johanna Larsson / Cornelia Lister; Madrie Le Roux / Chanel Simmonds	6; 3	6; 3

=== Norway vs. Slovenia ===
Norway
2
Šiauliai Tennis School, Šiauliai, Lithuania
21 April 2017
Hard (indoors)

Slovenia
1

			1	2	3
1	(Norway) (Slovenia)	Astrid Wanja Brune Olsen; Kaja Juvan	6; 4	6^{5} 7^{7}	6; 3
2	(Norway) (Slovenia)	Ulrikke Eikeri; Dalila Jakupović	1; 6	2; 6
3	(Norway) (Slovenia)	Malene Helgø / Caroline Rohde-Moe; Dalila Jakupović / Andreja Klepač	1; 0			retired
