= 2009 Soweto Open =

- Date: 13–18 April
- Edition: 1st
- Location: Johannesburg, South Africa

Champions

Singles
- (France) Fabrice Santoro

Doubles
- (Australia) Chris Guccione / (Switzerland) George Bastl
| Soweto Open | · 2010 → |

The 2009 Soweto Open was a professional tennis tournament played on hard courts. It was part of the 2009 ATP Challenger Tour. It took place in Johannesburg, South Africa between 13 and 18 April 2009.

== Singles entrants ==
=== Seeds ===
| Nationality | Player | Ranking* | Seeding |
|---|---|---|---|
| FRA | Fabrice Santoro | 52 | 1 |
| LUX | Gilles Müller | 67 | 2 |
| GER | ~~Michael Berrer~~ | ~~109~~ | ~~3~~ |
| BRA | Thiago Alves | 121 | 4 |
| RUS | Mikhail Elgin | 135 | 5 |
| FRA | Nicolas Mahut | 139 | 6 |
| AUS | Chris Guccione | 149 | 7 |
| SVK | Karol Beck | 159 | 8 |

- Rankings are as of 6 April 2009.

=== Other entrants ===
The following players received wildcards into the singles main draw:

- (South Africa) Andrew Anderson
- (South Africa) Raven Klaasen
- (South Africa) Fritz Wolmarans

The following players entry from the qualifying draw:

- (United Kingdom) Chris Eaton
- (South Korea) Jun Woong-Sun
- (Ukraine) Denys Molchanov
- (Israel) Noam Okun

The following players entry from Lucky loser draw:

- (South Africa) Benjamin Janse van Rensburg

== Champions ==
=== Men's singles ===
(France) Fabrice Santoro def. (South Africa) Rik de Voest, 7–5, 6–4

=== Men's doubles ===
(Australia) Chris Guccione / (Switzerland) George Bastl def. (Russia) Mikhail Elgin / (Russia) Alexander Kudryavtsev, 6–2, 4–6, [11–9]
