= 2013 Soweto Open – Women's singles =

Women's singles
- 2013 Soweto Open

Final
- Champion: (Hungary) Tímea Babos
- Runner-up: (South Africa) Chanel Simmonds
- Score: 6–7^{(3–7)}, 6–4, 6–1

Events
Singles	men	women
Doubles	men	women
← 2012 ·	Soweto Open	· 2014 →

The defending champion from 2011 was Valeria Savinykh, as there was no event in 2012, but she decided not to compete in 2013.

Tímea Babos won the title, defeating Chanel Simmonds in the final, 6–7^{(3–7)}, 6–4, 6–1.

== Seeds ==
1. (Hungary) Tímea Babos (champion)
2. (Israel) Julia Glushko (quarterfinals)
3. (Slovenia) Tadeja Majerič (quarterfinals)
4. (Ukraine) Nadiya Kichenok (semifinals)
5. (South Africa) Chanel Simmonds (final)
6. (Serbia) Jovana Jakšić (second round)
7. (United Kingdom) Samantha Murray (quarterfinals)
8. (Poland) Magda Linette (second round)

== Main draw ==
=== Key ===
- Q = Qualifier
- WC = Wild card
- LL = Lucky loser
- Alt = Alternate
- SE = Special exempt
- PR = Protected ranking
- ITF = ITF entry
- JE = Junior exempt
- w/o = Walkover
- r = Retired
- d = Defaulted
- SR = Special ranking

=== Finals ===
Semifinals
1	(Hungary) Tímea Babos	6	6
(Serbia) Teodora Mirčić	2	3
4	(Ukraine) Nadiya Kichenok	2	2
5	(South Africa) Chanel Simmonds	6	6

Final
1	(Hungary) Tímea Babos	6^{3}	6	6
5	(South Africa) Chanel Simmonds	7^{7}	4	1

=== Top half ===
First round
1	(Hungary) T Babos	6	6
(Israel) K Shlomo	1	2
(Russia) M Lazareva	3	1
(Turkey) P Özgen	6	6
WC	(South Africa) M le Roux	7	6
Q	(Zimbabwe) F Mawisire	5	1
(United Kingdom) E Webley-Smith	1	0^{r}
7	(United Kingdom) S Murray	6	0
3	(Slovenia) T Majerič	6	6
(South Africa) L Kiro	0	2
(Brazil) N Rossi	6	4	2
(Poland) J Jegiołka	4	6	6
(Serbia) T Mirčić	6	6
WC	(South Africa) Z Pienaar	0	2
(Brazil) L Pigossi	3	3
6	(Serbia) J Jakšić	6	6

Second round
1	(Hungary) T Babos	6	4	6
(Turkey) P Özgen	2	6	1
WC	(South Africa) M le Roux	0	1
7	(United Kingdom) S Murray	6	6
3	(Slovenia) T Majerič	6	6
(Poland) J Jegiołka	1	3
(Serbia) T Mirčić	2	6	6
6	(Serbia) J Jakšić	6	1	2

Quarterfinals
1	(Hungary) T Babos	5	6	6
7	(United Kingdom) S Murray	7	3	0
3	(Slovenia) T Majerič	7	1	5
(Serbia) T Mirčić	5	6	7

Semifinals
1	(Hungary) T Babos	6	6
(Serbia) T Mirčić	2	3

=== Bottom half ===
First round
8	(Poland) M Linette	7	6
(Turkey) B Eraydın	5	1
(United Kingdom) J Windley	6	7^{7}
Q	(Bulgaria) A Vangelova	2	6^{4}
(Austria) N Rottmann	3	2
(Slovakia) Z Zlochová	6	6
(United States) A Riley	2	0
4	(Ukraine) N Kichenok	6	6
5	(South Africa) C Simmonds	6	6
WC	(South Africa) I Hattingh	0	2
(Germany) K Grajdek	7^{13}	2	0
WC	(South Africa) N Fourouclas	6^{11}	6	6
(United States) N Melichar	6	6
Q	(Italy) C Coppola	0	3
(Turkey) M Sezer	2	7^{7}	2
2/Q	(Israel) J Glushko	6	6^{1}	6

Second round
8	(Poland) M Linette	6	4	4
(United Kingdom) J Windley	0	6	6
(Slovakia) Z Zlochová	1	3
4	(Ukraine) N Kichenok	6	6
5	(South Africa) C Simmonds	6	6
WC	(South Africa) N Fourouclas	3	2
(United States) N Melichar	3	3
2/Q	(Israel) J Glushko	6	6

Quarterfinals
(United Kingdom) J Windley	6	1	1
4	(Ukraine) N Kichenok	2	6	6
5	(South Africa) C Simmonds	7	6
2/Q	(Israel) J Glushko	5	0

Semifinals
4	(Ukraine) N Kichenok	2	2
5	(South Africa) C Simmonds	6	6
