= 2013 Soweto Open – Women's doubles =

Women's doubles
- 2013 Soweto Open

Final
- Champions: (Poland) Magda Linette (South Africa) Chanel Simmonds
- Runners-up: (United Kingdom) Samantha Murray (United Kingdom) Jade Windley
- Score: 6–1, 6–3

Events
Singles	men	women
Doubles	men	women
← 2012 ·	Soweto Open	· 2014 →

The defending champions from 2010 were Vitalia Diatchenko and Eirini Georgatou, as there was no event in 2012 and the 2011 Soweto Open – Women's doubles tournament was cancelled due to heavy rain and flooding. Neither player participated in 2013.

Magda Linette and Chanel Simmonds won the title, defeating Samantha Murray and Jade Windley in the final, 6–1, 6–3.

== Seeds ==
1. (Poland) Magda Linette / (South Africa) Chanel Simmonds (champions)
2. (Turkey) Başak Eraydın / (Israel) Julia Glushko (quarterfinals)
3. (Serbia) Teodora Mirčić / (Turkey) Pemra Özgen (semifinals)
4. (Ukraine) Nadiya Kichenok / (Russia) Margarita Lazareva (first round)

== Draw ==
=== Key ===
- Q = Qualifier
- WC = Wild card
- LL = Lucky loser
- Alt = Alternate
- SE = Special exempt
- PR = Protected ranking
- ITF = ITF entry
- JE = Junior exempt
- w/o = Walkover
- r = Retired
- d = Defaulted
- SR = Special ranking

First round
1	(Poland) M Linette (South Africa) C Simmonds	6	6
(Poland) J Jegiołka (United States) A Riley	1	1
WC	(South Africa) Z Pienaar (South Africa) J Schmidt	1	4
(Slovenia) T Majerič (Israel) K Shlomo	6	6
3	(Serbia) T Mirčić (Turkey) P Özgen	6	6
WC	(Zimbabwe) N Dzenga (Serbia) V Klarić	0	0
(Germany) K Grajdek (United Kingdom) E Webley-Smith	3	0^{r}
(South Africa) L Kiro (Brazil) N Rossi	6	0
(Italy) C Coppola (South Africa) M van Heerden	6	7^{9}
(South Africa) S Cox (South Africa) C Herb	3	6^{7}
(Brazil) L Pigossi (Slovakia) Z Zlochová	6	5	[11]
4	(Ukraine) N Kichenok (Russia) M Lazareva	3	7	[9]
(United Kingdom) S Murray (United Kingdom) J Windley	6	5	[12]
(United States) N Melichar (Turkey) M Sezer	4	7	[10]
WC	(South Africa) I Hattingh (South Africa) M le Roux	4	4
2	(Turkey) B Eraydın (Israel) J Glushko	6	6

Quarterfinals
1	(Poland) M Linette (South Africa) C Simmonds	6	6
(Slovenia) T Majerič (Israel) K Shlomo	1	2
3	(Serbia) T Mirčić (Turkey) P Özgen	6	6
(South Africa) L Kiro (Brazil) N Rossi	2	2
(Italy) C Coppola (South Africa) M van Heerden	3	3
(Brazil) L Pigossi (Slovakia) Z Zlochová	6	6
(United Kingdom) S Murray (United Kingdom) J Windley	6	4	[10]
2	(Turkey) B Eraydın (Israel) J Glushko	4	6	[3]

Semifinals
1	(Poland) M Linette (South Africa) C Simmonds	6	6
3	(Serbia) T Mirčić (Turkey) P Özgen	3	4
(Brazil) L Pigossi (Slovakia) Z Zlochová	3	6	[6]
(United Kingdom) S Murray (United Kingdom) J Windley	6	4	[10]

Final
1	(Poland) M Linette (South Africa) C Simmonds	6	6
(United Kingdom) S Murray (United Kingdom) J Windley	1	3
