= 2009 Soweto Open – Doubles =

Doubles
- 2009 Soweto Open

Final
- Champions: (Australia) Chris Guccione (Switzerland) George Bastl
- Runners-up: (Russia) Michail Elgin (Russia) Alexandre Kudryavtsev
- Score: 6–2, 4–6, [11–9]

Events
Singles	Doubles
← 2008 ·	Soweto Open	· 2010 →

Chris Guccione and George Bastl won in the final 6–2, 4–6, [11–9], against Michail Elgin and Alexandre Kudryavtsev.

== Seeds ==
1. (South Africa) Rik de Voest / (United States) Scott Lipsky (quarterfinals)
2. (Russia) Michail Elgin / (Russia) Alexandre Kudryavtsev (final)
3. (Pakistan) Aisam-ul-Haq Qureshi / (Australia) Joseph Sirianni (quarterfinals)
4. (Germany) ~~Michael Berrer~~ / (South Africa) ~~Chris Haggard~~ (withdrew)

== Draw ==
=== Key ===
- Q = Qualifier
- WC = Wild card
- LL = Lucky loser
- Alt = Alternate
- SE = Special exempt
- PR = Protected ranking
- ITF = ITF entry
- JE = Junior exempt
- w/o = Walkover
- r = Retired
- d = Defaulted
- SR = Special ranking

=== Draw ===
First round
1	(South Africa) R de Voest (United States) S Lipsky	7	4	[10]
(Netherlands) M Koning (Ukraine) D Molchanov	6^{3}	6	[8]
(Brazil) T Alves (Spain) F Vicente	6	6
(Switzerland) M Chiudinelli (France) F Santoro	2	4
3	(Pakistan) A-u-H Qureshi (Australia) J Sirianni	6	6
WC	(South Africa) J Andersen (South Africa) H Koertzen	3	4
(Switzerland) G Bastl (Australia) C Guccione	6	6^{3}	[11]
(Slovakia) K Beck (Czech Republic) J Levinský	3	7	[9]
WC	(South Africa) A Anderson (South Africa) B J van Rensburg	3	2
(Israel) H Levy (Israel) N Okun	6	6
(Ukraine) S Bubka (Luxembourg) G Müller	6	6
ALT	(South Korea) W-S Jun (Sweden) B Rehnquist	3	1
WC	(South Africa) I van der Merwe (South Africa) F Wolmarans	6^{3}	6	[7]
(France) N Mahut (France) É Roger-Vasselin	7	4	[10]
(Spain) J Checa-Calvo (Spain) C Poch-Gradin	6	5	[7]
2	(Russia) M Elgin (Russia) A Kudryavtsev	2	7	[10]

Quarterfinals
1	(South Africa) R de Voest (United States) S Lipsky	6^{1}	3
(Brazil) T Alves (Spain) F Vicente	7	6
3	(Pakistan) A-u-H Qureshi (Australia) J Sirianni	6^{6}	3
(Switzerland) G Bastl (Australia) C Guccione	7	6
(Israel) H Levy (Israel) N Okun	6	6
(Ukraine) S Bubka (Luxembourg) G Müller	3	4
(France) N Mahut (France) É Roger-Vasselin	7	6^{4}	[6]
2	(Russia) M Elgin (Russia) A Kudryavtsev	6^{9}	7	[10]

Semifinals
(Brazil) T Alves (Spain) F Vicente	7	1	[5]
(Switzerland) G Bastl (Australia) C Guccione	6^{4}	6	[10]
(Israel) H Levy (Israel) N Okun	4	7	[8]
2	(Russia) M Elgin (Russia) A Kudryavtsev	6	5	[10]

Finals
(Switzerland) G Bastl (Australia) C Guccione	6	4	[11]
2	(Russia) M Elgin (Russia) A Kudryavtsev	2	6	[9]
