= 2011 Soweto Open – Men's singles =

Men's singles
- 2011 Soweto Open

Final
- Champions: (South Africa) Izak van der Merwe
- Runners-up: (South Africa) Rik de Voest
- Score: 6–7(2), 7–5, 6–3

Events
Singles	men	women
Doubles	men	women
- Soweto Open

Dustin Brown was the defending champion, but lost to Izak van der Merwe in the semifinals.
Izak van der Merwe won the title, defeating Rik de Voest 6–7(2), 7–5, 6–3 in the final.

== Seeds ==
1. (Germany) Dustin Brown (semifinals)
2. (Luxembourg) Gilles Müller (quarterfinals)
3. (Poland) Michał Przysiężny (quarterfinals, retired)
4. (South Africa) Izak van der Merwe (champion)
5. (Belgium) Ruben Bemelmans (first round)
6. (South Africa) Rik de Voest (final)
7. (Slovakia) Andrej Martin (quarterfinals)
8. (Australia) Matthew Ebden (quarterfinals)

== Draw ==
Key

- Q = Qualifier
- WC = Wild card
- LL = Lucky loser
- Alt = Alternate
- ITF = ITF entry
- PR = Protected ranking
- SR = Special ranking
- SE = Special exempt
- JE = Junior exempt
- JR = Junior Accelerator Programme entrant
- CO = College Accelerator Programme entrant
- NG = Next Gen Accelerator Program entrant
- w/o = Walkover
- r = Retired
- d = Defaulted

=== Finals ===
Semifinals
1	(Germany) Dustin Brown	5	6^{5}
4	(South Africa) Izak van der Merwe	7	7
6	(South Africa) Rik de Voest	3	7	6
(Australia) Greg Jones	6	6^{4}	2

Final
4	(South Africa) Izak van der Merwe	6^{2}	7	6
6	(South Africa) Rik de Voest	7	5	3

=== Top half ===
First round
1	(Germany) D Brown	6	3	6
WC	(South Africa) N Scholtz	2	6	3
(Israel) A Weintraub	2	6^{8}
(United States) R Ram	6	7
(Thailand) D Udomchoke	6	6
(Germany) A Begemann	4	1
Q	(Japan) T Matsui	5	3
8	(Australia) M Ebden	7	6
4	(South Africa) I van der Merwe	7	7
(United Kingdom) D Cox	5	6^{3}
Q	(Russia) S Vovk	6^{4}	3
Q	(United Kingdom) C Eaton	7	6
WC	(South Africa) R Roelofse	6	6
WC	(South Africa) Warren Kuhn	3	1
(Austria) A Peya	6	6^{2}	2
7	(Slovakia) A Martin	2	7	6

Second round
1	(Germany) D Brown	6	6
(United States) R Ram	4	4
(Thailand) D Udomchoke	3	6^{4}
8	(Australia) M Ebden	6	7
4	(South Africa) I van der Merwe	6	7
Q	(United Kingdom) C Eaton	4	6^{3}
WC	(South Africa) R Roelofse	6	4	2
7	(Slovakia) A Martin	1	6	6

Quarterfinals
1	(Germany) D Brown	6	7
8	(Australia) M Ebden	3	6^{4}
4	(South Africa) I van der Merwe	7	7
7	(Slovakia) A Martin	6^{2}	6^{2}

Semifinals
1	(Germany) D Brown	5	6^{5}
4	(South Africa) I van der Merwe	7	7

=== Bottom half ===
First round
6	(South Africa) R de Voest	6	6
(South Africa) R Klaasen	4	4
Q	(Ukraine) D Molchanov	6	6
(Belgium) Y Mertens	3	4
(Ukraine) S Bubka	6	6
(Russia) E Kirillov	2	4
(Germany) S Stadler	4	2
3	(Poland) M Przysiężny	6	6
5	(Belgium) R Bemelmans	5	7	5
(Czech Republic) J Mertl	7	5	7
(Australia) G Jones	6	6
WC	(South Africa) Renier Moolman	3	2
(France) L Walter	6	6
(India) K Rastogi	4	4
(Germany) S Rieschick	1	4
2	(Luxembourg) G Müller	6	6

Second round
6	(South Africa) R de Voest	6	3	6
Q	(Ukraine) D Molchanov	3	6	3
(Ukraine) S Bubka	2	3
3	(Poland) M Przysiężny	6	6
(Czech Republic) J Mertl	6^{2}	5
(Australia) G Jones	7	7
(France) L Walter	3	5
2	(Luxembourg) G Müller	6	7

Quarterfinals
6	(South Africa) R de Voest	2
3	(Poland) M Przysiężny	0^{r}
(Australia) G Jones	7	6
2	(Luxembourg) G Müller	5	3

Semifinals
6	(South Africa) R de Voest	3	7	6
(Australia) G Jones	6	6^{4}	2
