= Clothilde de Bernardi =

French tennis player (born 1994)

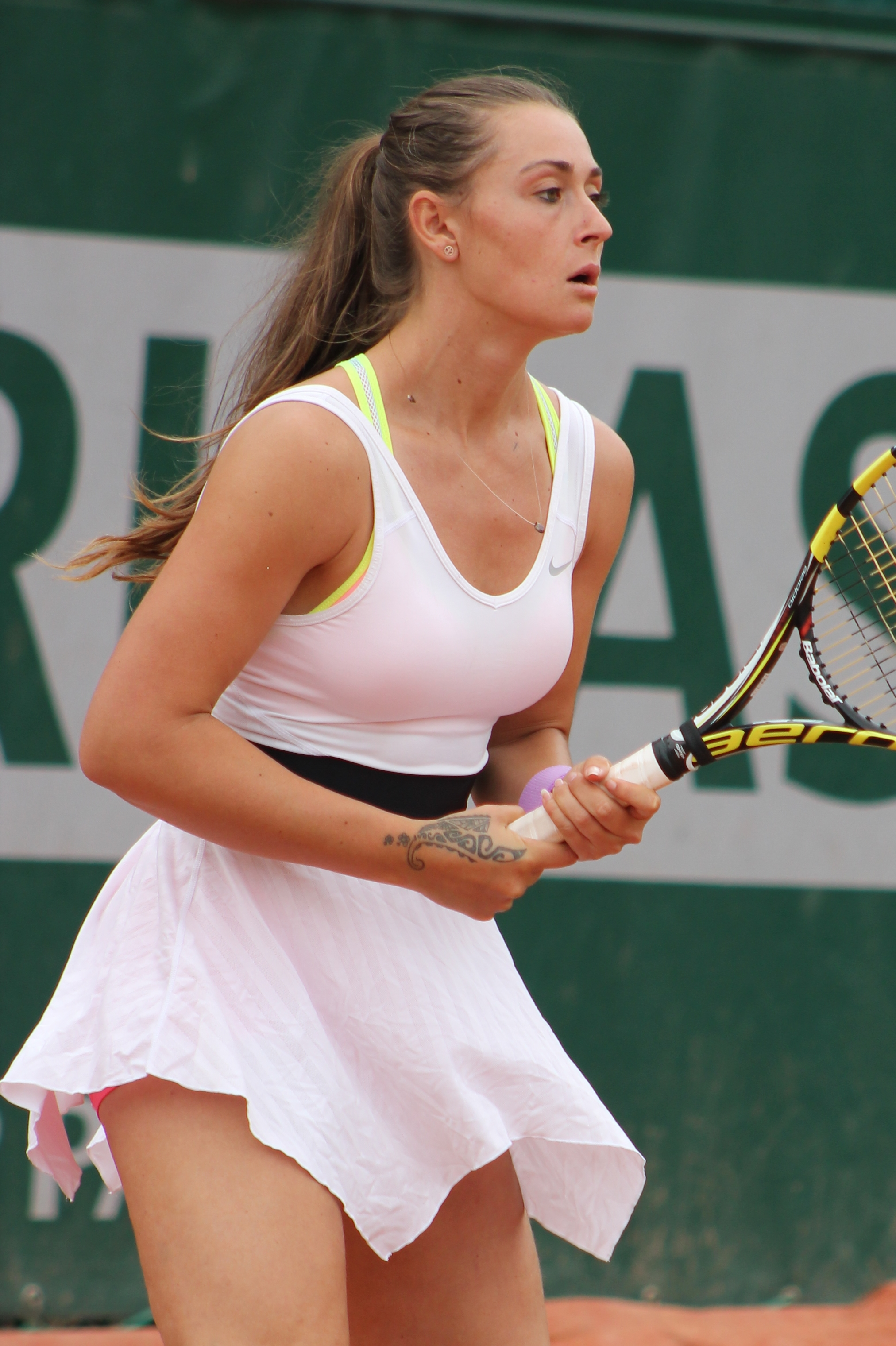
- Clothilde at Roland Garros, 2015
- Country (sports): France
- Residence: Paris
- Born: 16 November 1994 (age 30); Bastia, Corsica
- Height: 1.73 m (5 ft 8 in)
- Plays: Right-handed (two-handed backhand)
- Prize money: $96,469

Singles
- Career record: 229–150
- Career titles: 11 ITF
- Highest ranking: No. 276 (8 June 2015)

Grand Slam singles results
- French Open: Q3 (2015)

Doubles
- Career record: 44–51
- Career titles: 3 ITF
- Highest ranking: No. 436 (18 August 2014)

Grand Slam doubles results
- French Open: 1R (2015, 2016)

Grand Slam mixed doubles results
- French Open: 1R (2015)

Clothilde de Bernardi (born 16 November 1994) is a French former tennis player.

De Bernardi has a career-high singles ranking of world No. 276, achieved on 8 June 2015. On 18 August 2014, she peaked at No. 436 in the WTA doubles rankings. In her career, she won eleven singles titles and three doubles titles on the ITF Women's Circuit.

In May 2015, she received a wildcard to play in the French Open doubles tournament with partner Shérazad Reix. She also received a wildcard entry into the mixed doubles, partnering with Maxime Hamou.

== ITF finals ==
=== Singles: 17 (11 titles, 6 runner-ups) ===
Legend $25,000 tournaments $15,000 tournaments $10,000 tournaments	Finals by surface Hard (8–6) Clay (3–0)

Result	No.	Date	Tournament	Surface	Opponent	Score
Loss	1.	15 November 2010	ITF Équeurdreville, France	Hard	(France) Jessica Ginier	5–7, 2–6
Loss	2.	18 February 2013	ITF Sharm El Sheikh, Egypt	Hard	(Russia) Polina Vinogradova	2–6, 7–6^{(9–7)}, 2–6
Win	1.	16 June 2013	Guimarães Ladies Open, Portugal	Hard	(Mexico) Ximena Hermoso	6–0, 6–2
Win	2.	24 June 2013	ITF Melilla, Spain	Hard	(Spain) Lucia Cervera-Vazquez	7–5, 6–4
Loss	3.	28 July 2013	ITF Les Contamines, France	Hard	(Slovakia) Kristína Kučová	5–7, 7–6^{(7–3)}, 3–6
Win	3.	12 August 2013	ITF Sharm El Sheikh, Egypt	Hard	(Ukraine) Anastasia Kharchenko	6–0, 6–1
Loss	4.	8 June 2014	ITF Sun City, South Africa	Hard	(South Africa) Ilze Hattingh	1–6, 3–6
Win	4.	30 June 2014	ITF Istanbul, Turkey	Hard	(Romania) Cristina Adamescu	6–2, 6–3
Win	5.	24 August 2014	ITF Antalya, Turkey	Hard	(Turkey) İpek Soylu	6–4, 2–6, 6–3
Win	6.	21 September 2014	ITF Antalya, Turkey	Hard	(Czech Republic) Kateřina Kramperová	6–2, 6–3
Win	7.	22 February 2015	ITF El Kantaoui, Tunisia	Hard	(France) Lou Brouleau	6–4, 6–2
Win	8.	15 March 2015	ITF El Kantaoui, Tunisia	Hard	(Spain) Cristina Sanchez-Quintanar	6–4, 6–3
Loss	5.	25 April 2015	ITF Dakar, Senegal	Hard	(France) Kinnie Laisné	3–6, 6–0, 4–6
Loss	6.	3 August 2015	ITF Segovia, Spain	Hard	(Spain) Rocío de la Torre Sánchez	4–6, 6–3, 4–6
Win	9.	6 August 2017	ITF Savitaipale, Finland	Clay	(Czech Republic) Monika Kilnarová	6–3, 6–1
Win	10.	12 August 2017	ITF Vienna, Austria	Clay	(Czech Republic) Gabriela Pantůčková	6–1, 6–2
Win	11.	1 October 2017	ITF Jounieh Open, Lebanon	Clay	(Turkey) Berfu Cengiz	6–0, 6–4

=== Doubles: 5 (3–2) ===
Legend $25,000 tournaments $15,000 tournaments $10,000 tournaments	Finals by surface Hard (2–2) Clay (1–0)

Result	No.	Date	Location	Surface	Partner	Opponents	Score
Loss	1.	18 February 2013	Sharm El Sheikh, Egypt	Hard	(France) Chloé Paquet	(Slovenia) Anja Prislan (Germany) Jasmin Steinherr	6–3, 2–6, [4–10]
Win	1.	23 August 2013	Braunschweig, Germany	Clay	(Bulgaria) Isabella Shinikova	(Czech Republic) Tereza Malíková (Czech Republic) Tereza Smitková	3–6, 6–1, [10–8]
Win	2.	20 July 2014	Sharm El Sheikh, Egypt	Hard	(South Africa) Michelle Sammons	(Italy) Giulia Bruzzone (Russia) Alina Mikheeva	7–5, 7–5
Loss	2.	8 August 2014	Caracas, Venezuela	Hard	(Japan) Ayaka Okuno	(Argentina) Vanesa Furlanetto (Argentina) Florencia Molinero	0–6, 0–6
Win	3.	18 October 2014	Antalya, Turkey	Hard	(Poland) Agata Barańska	(Germany) Katharina Hering (Netherlands) Jainy Scheepens	6–3, 6–3
