= 2009 Soweto Open – Singles =

Singles
- 2009 Soweto Open

Final
- Champion: (France) Fabrice Santoro
- Runner-up: (South Africa) Rik de Voest
- Score: 7–5, 6–4

Events
Singles	Doubles
- Soweto Open

Fabrice Santoro won in the final of first edition of this tournament. He defeated Rik de Voest 7–5, 6–4.

== Seeds ==
1. (France) Fabrice Santoro (champion)
2. (Luxembourg) Gilles Müller (first round)
3. (Germany) ~~Michael Berrer~~ (withdrew)
4. (Brazil) Thiago Alves (semifinals)
5. (Russia) Mikhail Elgin (first round)
6. (France) Nicolas Mahut (quarterfinals)
7. (Australia) Chris Guccione (first round)
8. (Slovakia) Karol Beck (quarterfinals)

== Draw ==
Key

- Q = Qualifier
- WC = Wild card
- LL = Lucky loser
- Alt = Alternate
- ITF = ITF entry
- PR = Protected ranking
- SR = Special ranking
- SE = Special exempt
- JE = Junior exempt
- JR = Junior Accelerator Programme entrant
- CO = College Accelerator Programme entrant
- NG = Next Gen Accelerator Program entrant
- w/o = Walkover
- r = Retired
- d = Defaulted

=== Final four ===
Semifinals
1/WC	(France) Fabrice Santoro	6	7
4	(Brazil) Thiago Alves	3	6^{2}
(South Africa) Rik de Voest	6	7
WC	(South Africa) Fritz Wolmarans	4	5

Final
1/WC	(France) Fabrice Santoro	7	6
(South Africa) Rik de Voest	5	4

=== Top half ===
First round
1/WC	(France) F Santoro	6	6
(Russia) A Kudryavtsev	2	4
WC	(South Africa) R Klaasen	6	7
Q	(Israel) N Okun	4	6^{6}
(Sweden) B Rehnquist	6	6
(Spain) J Checa-Calvo	2	1
(Switzerland) G Bastl	6^{8}	6^{2}
6	(France) N Mahut	7	7
4	(Brazil) T Alves	7	6
Q	(Ukraine) D Molchanov	6^{3}	1
(South Africa) I van der Merwe	6	2	6^{5}
(France) É Roger-Vasselin	4	6	7
(Austria) S Koubek	6	6^{7}	6
Q	(South Korea) W-S Jun	3	7	3
(Israel) H Levy	7	7
7	(Australia) C Guccione	5	6^{7}

Second round
1/WC	(France) F Santoro	6	6
WC	(South Africa) R Klaasen	4	2
(Sweden) B Rehnquist	2	2
6	(France) N Mahut	6	6
4	(Brazil) T Alves	3
(France) É Roger-Vasselin	1	r
(Austria) S Koubek	5	7	6^{10}
(Israel) H Levy	7	5	7

Quarterfinals
1/WC	(France) F Santoro	6	6
6	(France) N Mahut	3	4
4	(Brazil) T Alves	6	6
(Israel) H Levy	2	3

Semifinals
1/WC	(France) F Santoro	6	7
4	(Brazil) T Alves	3	6^{2}

=== Bottom half ===
First round
8	(Slovakia) K Beck	6	6
(Netherlands) M Koning	4	4
(Australia) N Lindahl	3	7	6
(Pakistan) A-u-H Qureshi	6	6^{4}	4
Q	(United Kingdom) C Eaton	2	6	1
(South Africa) R de Voest	6	4	6
(Spain) C Poch-Gradin	6	6
LL	(South Africa) B J van Rensburg	1	1
5	(Russia) M Elgin	6	2	4
(Switzerland) M Chiudinelli	2	6	6
(Australia) J Sirianni	6	7
(Ukraine) S Bubka	3	6^{7}
WC	(South Africa) F Wolmarans	6^{3}	6	7
WC	(South Africa) A Anderson	7	3	6^{5}
(Spain) F Vicente	6^{4}	6	6
2	(Luxembourg) G Müller	7	4	2

Second round
8	(Slovakia) K Beck	6	6
(Australia) N Lindahl	0	3
(South Africa) R de Voest	7	6
(Spain) C Poch-Gradin	6^{2}	3
(Switzerland) M Chiudinelli	6	3	6^{10}
(Australia) J Sirianni	3	6	7
WC	(South Africa) F Wolmarans	6	6
(Spain) F Vicente	1	4

Quarterfinals
8	(Slovakia) K Beck	6	4	2
(South Africa) R de Voest	1	6	6
(Australia) J Sirianni	7	5	6^{0}
WC	(South Africa) F Wolmarans	6^{3}	7	7

Semifinals
(South Africa) R de Voest	6	7
WC	(South Africa) F Wolmarans	4	5
