= Michelle Sammons =

South African tennis player

- Full name: Michelle Tracy Sammons
- Country (sports): South Africa
- Residence: Durban
- Born: 11 September 1987 (age 38) Kempton Park
- Height: 1.73 m (5 ft 8 in)
- Plays: Right-handed (two-handed backhand)
- Prize money: $16,296

Singles
- Career record: 44–48
- Career titles: 1 ITF
- Highest ranking: No. 666 (23 February 2015)

Doubles
- Career record: 58–40
- Career titles: 6 ITF
- Highest ranking: No. 268 (2 November 2015)

Team competitions
- Fed Cup: 1–4

Michelle Tracy Sammons (born 11 September 1987) is a South African former professional tennis player.

She has career-high WTA rankings of 666 in singles and 268 in doubles, both achieved in 2015. In her career, Sammons won one singles title and six doubles titles on the ITF Women's Circuit.

Playing for South Africa in Fed Cup, she has a win–loss record of 1–4.

Sammons made her WTA Tour main-draw debut at the 2015 Internationaux de Strasbourg, partnering Carolin Daniels in the doubles competition.

== ITF finals ==
Legend
$100,000 tournaments
$75,000 tournaments
$50,000 tournaments
$25,000 tournaments
$10,000 tournaments

=== Singles (1–0) ===
| Outcome | No. | Date | Location | Surface | Opponent | Score |
|---|---|---|---|---|---|---|
| Winner | 1. | 31 May 2014 | Sun City, South Africa | Hard | (South Africa) Natasha Fourouclas | 2–6, 7–5, 6–4 |

=== Doubles (6–2) ===
| Outcome | No. | Date | Location | Surface | Partner | Opponents | Score |
|---|---|---|---|---|---|---|---|
| Winner | 1. | 30 May 2014 | Sun City, South Africa | Hard | (South Africa) Chanel Simmonds | (South Africa) Ilze Hattingh (South Africa) Madrie Le Roux | 7–5, 6–3 |
| Winner | 2. | 13 June 2014 | Sun City, South Africa | Hard | (South Africa) Chanel Simmonds | (South Africa) Ilze Hattingh (South Africa) Madrie Le Roux | 6–3, 6–3 |
| Winner | 3. | 19 July 2014 | Sharm El Sheikh, Egypt | Hard | (France) Clothilde de Bernardi | (Italy) Giulia Bruzzone (Russia) Alina Mikheeva | 7–5, 7–5 |
| Winner | 4. | 30 August 2014 | Sharm El Sheikh, Egypt | Hard | (Russia) Anna Morgina | (Italy) Giulia Bruzzone (India) Rishika Sunkara | 6–2, 6–1 |
| Winner | 5. | 6 September 2014 | Sharm El Sheikh, Egypt | Hard | (South Africa) Ilze Hattingh | (China) Gai Ao (India) Rishika Sunkara | 6–3, 7–5 |
| Runner-up | 1. | 13 September 2014 | Sharm El Sheikh, Egypt | Hard | (South Africa) Ilze Hattingh | (Russia) Anna Morgina (Russia) Yana Sizikova | 3–6, 6–0, [6–10] |
| Winner | 6 | 14 February 2015 | Port El Kantaoui, Tunisia | Hard | (South Africa) Ilze Hattingh | (Romania) Nicoleta Dascălu (Bulgaria) Julia Stamatova | 7–5, 6–3 |
| Runner-up | 2. | 19 September 2015 | Redding, United States | Hard | (Thailand) Varatchaya Wongteanchai | (United States) Ashley Weinhold (United States) Caitlin Whoriskey | 2–6, 5–7 |
