= 2011 Soweto Open =

- Date: 11–17 April
- Edition: 3rd
- Location: Johannesburg, South Africa

Champions

Men's singles
- (South Africa) Izak van der Merwe

Women's singles
- (Russia) Valeria Savinykh

Men's doubles
- (Germany) Michael Kohlmann / (Austria) Alexander Peya

Women's doubles
- none
← 2010 ·	Soweto Open	· 2012 →

The 2011 Soweto Open was a professional tennis tournament played on hard courts. It was the third edition of the tournament which is part of the 2011 ATP Challenger Tour. It took place in Johannesburg, South Africa between 11 and 17 April 2011. All women's doubles semifinal matches had been cancelled by the supervisor, due to heavy rain and flooding.

== ATP singles main-draw entrants ==
=== Seeds ===
Country	Player	Rank^{1}	Seed
GER	Dustin Brown	102	1
LUX	Gilles Müller	109	2
POL	Michał Przysiężny	146	3
RSA	Izak van der Merwe	150	4
BEL	Ruben Bemelmans	171	5
RSA	Rik de Voest	185	6
SVK	Andrej Martin	187	7
AUS	Matthew Ebden	198	8

- Rankings are as of 4 April 2011.

=== Other entrants ===
The following players received wildcards into the singles main draw:

- (South Africa) Warren Kuhn
- (South Africa) Renier Moolman
- (South Africa) Ruan Roelofse
- (South Africa) Nikala Scholtz

The following players received entry from the qualifying draw:

- (United Kingdom) Chris Eaton
- (Japan) Toshihide Matsui
- (Ukraine) Denys Molchanov
- (Russia) Stanislav Vovk

== WTA main draw singles entrants ==
=== Seeds ===
Country	Player	Rank^{1}	Seed
GBR	Anne Keothavong	107	1
CZE	Petra Cetkovská	125	2
RUS	Nina Bratchikova	129	3
CZE	Eva Birnerová	133	4
LUX	Mandy Minella	137	5
LUX	Anne Kremer	148	6
ITA	Corinna Dentoni	149	7
GER	Kathrin Wörle	153	8

- Rankings are as of 4 April 2011.

=== Other entrants ===
The following players received wildcards into the singles main draw:

- (South Africa) Natasha Fourouclas
- (South Africa) Lynn Kiro
- (Madagascar) Zarah Razafimahatratra
- (South Africa) Madrie Le Roux

The following players received entry from the qualifying draw:

- (Belgium) Gally de Wael
- (Germany) Kim Grajdek
- (Serbia) Teodora Mirčić
- (United States) Asia Muhammad

== Champions ==
=== Singles ===
(South Africa) Izak van der Merwe def. (South Africa) Rik de Voest, 6–7(2), 7–5, 6–3

(Russia) Valeria Savinykh def. (Czech Republic) Petra Cetkovská, 6–1, 6–3

=== Doubles ===
(Germany) Michael Kohlmann / (Austria) Alexander Peya def. (Germany) Andre Begemann / (Australia) Matthew Ebden 6–2, 6–2

Cancelled due to heavy rain and flooding
