= Ilze Hattingh =

South African tennis player (born 1996)

- Country (sports): South Africa
- Residence: Pretoria, South Africa
- Born: 22 April 1996 (age 30) Durban, South Africa
- Plays: Right-handed (two-handed backhand)
- College: Arizona State University
- Prize money: $21,100

Singles
- Career record: 77–53
- Career titles: 1 ITF
- Highest ranking: No. 599 (11 May 2015)

Doubles
- Career record: 78–37
- Career titles: 10 ITF
- Highest ranking: No. 405 (13 July 2015)

Team competitions
- Fed Cup: 4–10

Ilze Hattingh (born 22 April 1996) is a South African former professional tennis player.

Born in Durban, Hattingh was introduced to tennis at the age of seven. On the ITF Junior Circuit, she was ranked as high as world No. 49, which she achieved in January 2013. She has held the position as South Africa's junior number one girl tennis player on multiple occasions.

On the ITF Women's Circuit, she reached one $10k semifinal in singles, in Potchefstroom in December 2012. She also made her debut for the South Africa Fed Cup team in 2012.

== Career ==
=== 2013 ===
Hattingh began her 2013 campaign with back to back junior tournaments in Australia, the Grade-1 Loy Yang Power Traralgon International and the Australian Open, but lost in the first round of both. She then continued her training before resuming competitive play at three back to back Grade 2's in her home country, starting on 18 February. She reached semifinals of all three in singles, and claimed one doubles title alongside Madrie Le Roux. The strong performance boosted her junior ranking up to a career high of world No. 49.

In May, Hattingh was given a wildcard for the main draw of a $50k tournament in Johannesburg, but was knocked out by eventual finalist Chanel Simmonds in round one.

Hattingh returned to the ITF Junior Circuit in June, playing a Grade-1 event in Germany as the 15th seed. Following a bye in the first round, she reached the semifinals with the loss of one set, and but lost to Iryna Shymanovich on 15 June for a place in the final. This is the deepest she has gone into a Grade-1 draw. Ilze then proceeded to play four more junior tournaments in Europe, including Wimbledon, but didn't achieve much success, losing in qualifying at Wimbledon and failing to reach the quarterfinals of any other tournament.

At the end of the 2013 season, Hattingh competed in four consecutive $10k events in Sharm El Sheikh. As a qualifier, she reached the quarterfinals of two of the singles tournaments and was runner-up at one doubles tournament with close friend Madrie Le Roux. The professional breakthrough earned Ilze her first WTA singles and doubles rankings.

=== 2017 ===
Hattingh joined the Arizona State University tennis programme in the United States where she plays mainly at the No. 2 position.

== ITF Circuit finals ==
=== Singles: 2 (1–1) ===
Legend $25,000 tournaments $10,000 tournaments	Finals by surface Hard (1–1) Clay (0–0)

Outcome	No.	Date	Location	Surface	Opponent	Score
Winner	1.	8 June 2014	Sun City, South Africa	Hard	(France) Clothilde de Bernardi	6–1, 6–3
Runner-up	1.	5 July 2015	La Possession, Réunion	Hard	(Czech Republic) Marie Bouzková	2–6, 3–6

=== Doubles: 17 (10–7) ===
Legend $25,000 tournaments $10,000 tournaments	Finals by surface Hard (10–7) Clay (0–0)

Outcome	No.	Date	Location	Surface	Partner	Opponents	Score
Runner-up	1.	30 November 2013	Sharm El Sheikh, Egypt	Hard	(South Africa) Madrie Le Roux	(Spain) Arabela Rabaner Fernandez (Russia) Liudmila Vasilyeva	0–6, 2–6
Runner-up	2.	31 May 2014	Sun City, South Africa	Hard	(South Africa) Madrie Le Roux	(South Africa) Michelle Sammons (South Africa) Chanel Simmonds	5–7, 3–6
Runner-up	3.	7 June 2014	Sun City, South Africa	Hard	(South Africa) Madrie Le Roux	(Poland) Agata Baranska (United States) Stephanie Kent	w/o
Runner-up	4.	13 June 2014	Sun City, South Africa	Hard	(South Africa) Madrie Le Roux	(South Africa) Michelle Sammons (South Africa) Chanel Simmonds	3–6, 3–6
Winner	1.	26 July 2014	Sharm El Sheikh, Egypt	Hard	(South Africa) Madrie Le Roux	(Russia) Alina Mikheeva (Germany) Linda Prenkovic	6–1, 7–6
Winner	2.	6 September 2014	Sharm El Sheikh, Egypt	Hard	(South Africa) Michelle Sammons	(China) Gai Ao (India) Rishika Sunkara	6–3, 7–5
Runner-up	5.	14 September 2014	Sharm El Sheikh, Egypt	Hard	(South Africa) Michelle Sammons	(Russia) Anna Morgina (Russia) Yana Sizikova	3–6, 6–0, [6–10]
Winner	3.	21 September 2014	Sharm El Sheikh, Egypt	Hard	(India) Arantxa Andrady	(Russia) Anna Morgina (Russia) Yana Sizikova	7–6, 6–2
Winner	4.	14 February 2015	Port El Kantaoui, Tunisia	Hard	(South Africa) Michelle Sammons	(Romania) Nicoleta-Cătălina Dascălu (Bulgaria) Julia Stamatova	7–5, 6–3
Runner-up	6.	20 June 2015	Grand-Baie, Mauritius	Hard	(South Africa) Madrie Le Roux	(Czech Republic) Marie Bouzková (Netherlands) Rosalie van der Hoek	3–6, 5–7
Winner	5.	27 June 2015	Grand-Baie, Mauritius	Hard	(South Africa) Madrie Le Roux	(India) Snehadevi S Reddy (India) Dhruthi Tatachar Venugopal	6–2, 6–4
Winner	6.	3 July 2015	La Possession, Réunion	Hard	(France) Pauline Payet	(South Africa) Caitlin Herb (India) Tanisha Rohura	6–4, 6–3
Winner	7.	19 September 2015	Antalya, Turkey	Hard	(Slovakia) Chantal Škamlová	(Poland) Agata Baranska (China) Wang Yan	7–6^{(3)}, 3–6, [10–2]
Runner-up	7.	14 November 2015	Stellenbosch, South Africa	Hard	(South Africa) Madrie Le Roux	(United Kingdom) Francesca Stephenson (Netherlands) Erika Vogelsang	4–6, 4–6
Winner	8.	21 November 2015	Stellenbosch, South Africa	Hard	(South Africa) Madrie Le Roux	(Germany) Katharina Hering (Hungary) Naomi Totka	6–1, 7–6^{(5)}
Winner	9.	20 February 2016	Sharm El Sheikh, Egypt	Hard	(South Africa) Madrie Le Roux	(Romania) Oana Georgeta Simion (Bulgaria) Julia Terziyska	6–1, 6–2
Winner	10.	12 November 2016	Stellenbosch, South Africa	Hard	(South Africa) Madrie Le Roux	(Zimbabwe) Valeria Bhunu (Sweden) Linnea Malmqvist	6–1, 6–2

== Fed Cup participation ==
=== Singles ===
Edition	Stage	Date	Location	Against	Surface	Opponent	W/L	Score
2012 Fed Cup; Europe/Africa Zone Group II	R/R	18 April 2012	Cairo, Egypt	Denmark	Clay	Mai Grage	W	7–6^{(7–5)}, 5–7, 6–0
2012 Fed Cup; Europe/Africa Zone Group II	R/R	19 April 2012	Cairo, Egypt	Finland	Clay	Johanna Hyöty	W	6–2, 6–1
2012 Fed Cup; Europe/Africa Zone Group II	R/R	20 April 2012	Cairo, Egypt	Montenegro	Clay	Vladica Babic	W	6–2, 6–4
2012 Fed Cup; Europe/Africa Zone Group II	P/O	21 April 2012	Cairo, Egypt	Turkey	Clay	Pemra Özgen	L	4–6, 2–6
2016 Fed Cup; Europe/Africa Zone Group I	R/R	4 February 2016	Eilat, Israel	(United Kingdom) Great Britain	Hard	Katie Swan	L	3–6, 0–6
2016 Fed Cup; Europe/Africa Zone Group I	P/O	6 February 2016	Eilat, Israel	Hungary	Hard	Anna Bondár	L	0–6, 1–6
2017 Fed Cup; Europe/Africa Zone Group II	R/R	19 April 2017	Šiauliai, Lithuania	Norway	Hard (i)	Malene Helgø	L	1–6, 1–6
2017 Fed Cup; Europe/Africa Zone Group II	R/R	20 April 2017	Šiauliai, Lithuania	Slovenia	Hard (i)	Dalila Jakupović	L	1–6, 3–6
2017 Fed Cup; Europe/Africa Zone Group II	R/R	21 April 2017	Šiauliai, Lithuania	Sweden	Hard (i)	Cornelia Lister	L	6–3, 2–6, 3–6
2017 Fed Cup; Europe/Africa Zone Group II	P/O	22 April 2017	Šiauliai, Lithuania	Egypt	Hard (i)	Mai El Kamash	L	5–7, 6–1, 2–6

=== Doubles ===
Edition	Stage	Date	Location	Against	Surface	Partner	Opponents	W/L	Score
2015 Fed Cup; Europe/Africa Zone Group II	R/R	4 February 2015	Tallinn, Estonia	Egypt	Hard (i)	(South Africa) Michelle Sammons	Ola Abou Zekry; Sandra Samir	W	6–4, 6–3
2015 Fed Cup; Europe/Africa Zone Group II	R/R	6 February 2015	Tallinn, Estonia	Bosnia and Herzegovina	Hard (i)	(South Africa) Michelle Sammons	Jelena Simić; Jasmina Tinjić	L	4–6, 2–6
2016 Fed Cup; Europe/Africa Zone Group I	R/R	3 February 2016	Eilat, Israel	(Georgia (country)) Georgia	Hard	(South Africa) Michelle Sammons	Ekaterine Gorgodze; Oksana Kalashnikova	L	4–6, 6–7^{(6–8)}
2017 Fed Cup; Europe/Africa Zone Group II	R/R	20 April 2017	Šiauliai, Lithuania	Slovenia	Hard (i)	(South Africa) Madrie Le Roux	Dalila Jakupović; Andreja Klepač	L	2–6, 6–4, 0–6
