= 2010 Soweto Open =

- Date: 12–18 April
- Edition: 2nd
- Location: Johannesburg, South Africa

2009 Champions

Singles
- (Jamaica) Dustin Brown

Doubles
- (France) Nicolas Mahut / (Croatia) Lovro Zovko
- Soweto Open

The 2010 Soweto Open was a professional tennis tournament played on hard courts. It was part of the 2010 ATP Challenger Tour. It took place in Johannesburg, South Africa between 12 and 18 April 2010.

== ATP entrants ==
=== Seeds ===
Nationality	Player	Ranking*	Seeding
SVK	Lukáš Lacko	63	1
SVK	Karol Beck	78	2
TPE	Lu Yen-hsun	98	3
ISR	Harel Levy	125	4
JAM	Dustin Brown	126	5
SUI	Stéphane Bohli	140	6
SLO	Grega Žemlja	144	7
NED	Igor Sijsling	162	8

- Rankings are as of 5 April 2010.

=== Other entrants ===
The following players received wildcards into the singles main draw:

- (South Africa) Rik de Voest
- (South Africa) Raven Klaasen
- (South Africa) Ruan Roelofse
- (South Africa) Nikala Scholtz

The following players received entry from the qualifying draw:

- (United Kingdom) Chris Eaton
- (Ukraine) Denys Molchanov
- (Israel) Noam Okun
- (Austria) Alexander Peya

== Champions ==
=== Singles ===
(Jamaica) Dustin Brown def. (South Africa) Izak van der Merwe, 7–6(2), 6–3

=== Doubles ===
(France) Nicolas Mahut / (Croatia) Lovro Zovko def. (South Africa) Raven Klaasen / (South Africa) Izak van der Merwe, 6–2, 6–2
