= Chanel Simmonds =

South African tennis player (born 1992)

- Country (sports): South Africa
- Born: 10 August 1992 (age 33) Kempton Park, South Africa
- Height: 1.65 m (5 ft 5 in)
- Plays: Left (two-handed backhand)
- Prize money: $291,880

Singles
- Career record: 420–227
- Career titles: 23 ITF
- Highest ranking: No. 158 (27 May 2013)

Grand Slam singles results
- Australian Open: Q3 (2013)
- French Open: Q1 (2013, 2014)
- Wimbledon: Q2 (2012)
- US Open: 1R (2013)

Doubles
- Career record: 264–173
- Career titles: 29 ITF
- Highest ranking: No. 176 (26 August 2013)

Team competitions
- Fed Cup: 33–28
Medal record
Representing RSA
All-Africa Games
Silver medal – second place	2011 Maputo	women's singles
Bronze medal – third place	2011 Maputo	women's doubles
African Games
Silver medal – second place	2019 Rabat	women's singles

Chanel Simmonds (born 10 August 1992) is an inactive tennis player from South Africa.

Simmonds won 23 singles titles and 29 doubles titles on the ITF Women's Circuit. On 27 May 2013, she reached her best singles ranking of world No. 158. On 26 August 2013, she peaked at No. 176 in the WTA doubles rankings.

== Juniors ==
In August 2007, Simmonds won her first ITF Junior Circuit singles title at a G-4 event in Gaborone, Botswana.

As a junior, she reached a career-high combined rank of 14, and compiled a singles win–loss record of 95–30.

== ITF Circuit finals ==
=== Singles: 38 (23 titles, 15 runner-ups) ===
Legend $50,000 tournaments $25,000 tournaments $10/15,000 tournaments	Finals by surface Hard (17–12) Clay (6–3)

Result	W–L	Date	Tournament	Tier	Surface	Opponent	Score
Loss	0–1	Oct 2007	ITF Cape Town, South Africa	10,000	Hard	(South Africa) Lizaan du Plessis	1–6, 0–6
Loss	0–2	Oct 2008	ITF Pretoria, South Africa	10,000	Hard	(South Africa) Surina De Beer	3–6, 3–6
Loss	0–3	Aug 2009	ITF Arezzo, Italy	10,000	Clay	(Italy) Giulia Gatto-Monticone	5–7, 3–6
Win	1–3	Oct 2009	ITF Pretoria, South Africa	10,000	Hard	(Belgium) Davinia Lobbinger	6–1, 6–0
Win	2–3	Apr 2010	ITF Cairo, Egypt	10,000	Clay	(Austria) Tina Schiechtl	2–6, 6–3, 7–5
Win	3–3	May 2010	ITF Durban, South Africa	10,000	Hard	(India) Poojashree Venkatesha	6–1, 6–4
Win	4–3	May 2010	ITF Durban, South Africa	10,000	Hard	(Italy) Daniela Scivetti	6–1, 6–4
Win	5–3	Aug 2010	ITF São Paulo, Brazil	10,000	Clay	(Brazil) Roxane Vaisemberg	6–2, 3–6, 6–1
Win	6–3	Dec 2010	ITF Ain Sukhna, Egypt	10,000	Clay	(Serbia) Ana Jovanović	6–4, 6–7^{(5)}, 7–6^{(6)}
Win	7–3	May 2011	ITF Goyang, South Korea	25,000	Hard	(South Korea) Lee Ye-ra	6–7^{(9)}, 6–1, 7–6^{(3)}
Win	8–3	May 2011	ITF Changwon, South Korea	25,000	Hard	(Japan) Yurika Sema	6–2, 6–2
Loss	8–4	Oct 2011	ITF Jakarta, Indonesia	25,000	Hard	(Belgium) Tamaryn Hendler	7–5, 4–6, 3–6
Win	9–4	Dec 2011	ITF Rosario, Argentina	25,000	Clay	(United States) Julia Cohen	6–3, 6–4
Loss	9–5	Jun 2012	ITF Gimcheon, South Korea	25,000	Hard	(China) Duan Yingying	2–6, 1–6
Win	10–5	Sep 2012	ITF Salisbury, Australia	10,000	Hard	(Slovakia) Zuzana Zlochová	6–3, 6–0
Loss	10–6	Oct 2012	Lagos Open, Nigeria	25,000	Hard	(Romania) Cristina Dinu	5–7, 6–4, 4–6
Win	11–6	Dec 2012	ITF Potchefstroom, South Africa	10,000	Hard	(Israel) Keren Shlomo	6–1, 6–4
Loss	11–7	May 2013	Soweto Open, South Africa	50,000	Hard	(Hungary) Tímea Babos	7–6^{(3)}, 4–6, 1–6
Win	12–7	Feb 2014	ITF Buenos Aires, Argentina	10,000	Clay	(Russia) Yuliya Kalabina	6–2, 6–2
Loss	12–8	Mar 2014	ITF Buenos Aires, Argentina	10,000	Clay	(Russia) Irina Khromacheva	2–6, 5–7
Loss	12–9	Apr 2014	ITF Dakar, Senegal	15,000	Hard	(Switzerland) Conny Perrin	0–6, 5–7
Win	13–9	Jun 2014	ITF Sun City, South Africa	10,000	Hard	(South Africa) Madrie Le Roux	6–2, 6–2
Win	14–9	Mar 2015	ITF Port El Kantaoui, Tunisia	10,000	Hard	(Spain) Cristina Sánchez Quintanar	2–6, 7–6^{(0)}, 6–4
Win	15–9	Apr 2015	ITF Bangkok, Thailand	15,000	Hard	(Japan) Miyabi Inoue	7–6^{(4)}, 6–3
Loss	15–10	Mar 2016	ITF Weston, United States	10,000	Clay	(United States) Katerina Stewart	6–3, 2–6, 1–6
Win	16–10	Nov 2016	ITF Stellenbosch, South Africa	10,000	Hard	(United States) Kaitlyn Christian	4–6, 6–3, 7–5
Win	17–10	Nov 2016	ITF Stellenbosch	10,000	Hard	(Russia) Margarita Lazareva	6–1, 6–3
Loss	17–11	Nov 2016	ITF Stellenbosch	10,000	Hard	(Germany) Julyette Steur	0–6, 4–6
Loss	17–12	Sep 2017	ITF Redding, United States	25,000	Hard	(United States) Robin Anderson	1–6, 4–6
Loss	17–13	Nov 2017	ITF Dakar, Senegal	25,000	Hard	(Greece) Valentini Grammatikopoulou	0–6, 6–7^{(1)}
Win	18–13	Nov 2017	ITF Stellenbosch, South Africa	15,000	Hard	(Hungary) Naomi Totka	6–1, 6–0
Loss	18–14	Dec 2017	ITF Stellenbosch	15,000	Hard	(United States) Salma Ewing	6–4, 4–6, 4–6
Win	19–14	Dec 2017	ITF Stellenbosch	15,000	Hard	(France) Lou Adler	4–6, 7–6^{(3)}, 6–2
Win	20–14	Apr 2019	ITF Antalya, Turkey	15,000	Clay	(Germany) Laura Schaeder	6–2, 6–1
Win	21–14	May 2019	ITF Changwon, South Korea	25,000	Hard	(Chinese Taipei) Lee Ya-hsuan	6–3, 7–5
Win	22–14	Sep 2019	ITF Sajur, Israel	15,000	Hard	(Israel) Lina Glushko	7–5, 6–0
Win	23–14	Sep 2019	ITF Johannesburg, South Africa	15,000	Hard	(Australia) Tina Nadine Smith	6–0, 6–1
Loss	23–15	Jun 2023	ITF San Diego, United States	15,000	Hard	(United States) Sara Daavettila	6–7^{(3)}, 5–7

=== Doubles: 44 (29 titles, 15 runner-ups) ===
Legend $50/60,000 tournaments $25,000 tournaments $10/15,000 tournaments	Finals by surface Hard (21–11) Clay (8–4)

Result	W–L	Date	Tournament	Tier	Surface	Partner	Opponents	Score
Loss	0–1	Apr 2010	ITF Ain Sukhna, Egypt	10,000	Clay	(France) Audrey Bergot	(Sweden) Anna Brazhnikova (Russia) Marta Sirotkina	3–6, 3–6
Win	1–1	Dec 2010	ITF Ain Sukhna, Egypt	10,000	Clay	(Ukraine) Sofiya Kovalets	(Russia) Galina Fokina (Russia) Marina Melnikova	6–1, 6–2
Win	2–1	Oct 2011	ITF Palembang, Indonesia	25,000	Hard	(Belgium) Tamaryn Hendler	(Indonesia) Ayu Fani Damayanti (Indonesia) Jessy Rompies	6–4, 6–2
Win	3–1	Oct 2011	ITF Bayamón, Puerto Rico	25,000	Hard	(Croatia) Ajla Tomljanović	(United States) Victoria Duval (United States) Allie Kiick	6–3, 6–1
Win	4–1	Mar 2012	ITF Wellington, New Zealand	25,000	Hard	(United Kingdom) Anna Fitzpatrick	(South Korea) Han Sung-hee (Japan) Yurina Koshino	6–3, 6–4
Loss	4–2	Sep 2012	ITF Port Pirie, Australia	25,000	Hard	(Australia) Stephanie Bengson	(Australia) Sacha Jones (Australia) Sally Peers	4–6, 2–6
Win	5–2	Oct 2012	Lagos Open, Nigeria	25,000	Hard	(Switzerland) Conny Perrin	(Russia) Nina Bratchikova (Russia) Margarita Lazareva	6–1, 6–1
Win	6–2	Oct 2012	Lagos Open, Nigeria	25,000	Hard	(Switzerland) Conny Perrin	(China) Lu Jiajing (China) Lu Jiaxiang	6–2, 3–6, [10–7]
Win	7–2	Nov 2012	ITF Asunción, Paraguay	25,000	Clay	(Bolivia) María Fernanda Álvarez	(United States) Anamika Bhargava (United States) Sylvia Krywacz	4–6, 6–3, [10–5]
Win	8–2	May 2013	Soweto Open, South Africa	50,000	Hard	(Poland) Magda Linette	(United Kingdom) Samantha Murray (United Kingdom) Jade Windley	6–1, 6–3
Loss	8–3	Jul 2013	Lexington Challenger, US	50,000	Hard	(Israel) Julia Glushko	(Thailand) Nicha Lertpitaksinchai (Thailand) Peangtarn Plipuech	6–7^{(5)}, 3–6
Loss	8–4	Aug 2013	ITF Landisville, US	25,000	Hard	(United Kingdom) Emily Webley-Smith	(Australia) Monique Adamczak (Australia) Olivia Rogowska	2–6, 3–6
Loss	8–5	Oct 2013	Lagos Open, Nigeria	25,000	Hard	(Switzerland) Conny Perrin	(Oman) Fatma Al-Nabhani (Italy) Gioia Barbieri	6–1, 4–6, [8–10]
Win	9–5	Apr 2014	ITF Jackson, United States	25,000	Clay	(Slovenia) Maša Zec Peškirič	(Japan) Erika Sema (Japan) Yurika Sema	6–7^{(5)}, 6–3, [10–5]
Win	10–5	Apr 2014	ITF Dakar, Senegal	15,000	Hard	(United Kingdom) Emily Webley-Smith	(Switzerland) Conny Perrin (Russia) Ekaterina Yashina	6–4, 7–5
Win	11–5	May 2014	ITF Sun City, South Africa	10,000	Hard	(South Africa) Michelle Sammons	(South Africa) Ilze Hattingh (South Africa) Madrie Le Roux	7–5, 6–3
Win	12–5	Jun 2014	ITF Sun City, South Africa	10,000	Hard	(South Africa) Michelle Sammons	(South Africa) Ilze Hattingh (South Africa) Madrie Le Roux	6–3, 6–3
Win	13–5	Aug 2014	ITF Braunschweig, Germany	15,000	Clay	(Switzerland) Conny Perrin	(Russia) Polina Leykina (Bulgaria) Isabella Shinikova	6–3, 6–0
Win	14–5	Jan 2015	ITF Antalya, Turkey	10,000	Clay	(Turkey) Melis Sezer	(Georgia (country)) Ekaterine Gorgodze (Georgia (country)) Sofia Kvatsabaia	6–4, 4–6, [10–4]
Loss	14–6	Mar 2015	ITF Port El Kantaoui, Tunisia	10,000	Hard	(United States) Jessica Ho	(Spain) Cristina Sánchez Quintanar (France) Clara Tanielian	5–7, 7–6^{(9)}, [3–10]
Loss	14–7	Mar 2015	ITF Port El Kantaoui, Tunisia	10,000	Hard	(Belgium) Magali Kempen	(France) Myrtille Georges (Bulgaria) Isabella Shinikova	6–1, 4–6, [2–10]
Loss	14–8	Mar 2015	ITF Bangkok, Thailand	15,000	Hard	(United Kingdom) Emily Webley-Smith	(South Korea) Jang Su-jeong (Serbia) Vojislava Lukić	4–6, 4–6
Loss	14–9	Jun 2015	ITF Ystad, Sweden	25,000	Clay	(Switzerland) Conny Perrin	(Switzerland) Xenia Knoll (Sweden) Cornelia Lister	5–7, 6–7^{(5)}
Loss	14–10	Jun 2015	ITF Baton Rouge, US	25,000	Hard	(Australia) Storm Sanders	(United States) Samantha Crawford (United States) Emily Harman	6–7^{(4)}, 1–6
Win	15–10	Apr 2016	ITF León, Mexico	10,000	Hard	(Mexico) Renata Zarazúa	(Mexico) Sabastiani León (Mexico) Nazari Urbina	6–0, 6–2
Win	16–10	Apr 2016	ITF Heraklion, Greece	10,000	Hard	(United Kingdom) Freya Christie	(Russia) Valeria Savinykh (Ukraine) Alyona Sotnikova	6–4, 6–0
Loss	16–11	Jul 2016	Sacramento Challenger, US	50,000	Hard	(United States) Jamie Loeb	(United States) Ashley Weinhold (United States) Caitlin Whoriskey	4–6, 4–6
Win	17–11	Aug 2016	ITF Fort Worth, US	25,000	Hard	(Chinese Taipei) Hsu Chieh-yu	(United States) Jacqueline Cako (United States) Danielle Lao	6–0, 6–4
Loss	17–12	Oct 2016	Las Vegas Open, US	50,000	Hard	(United States) Jamie Loeb	(Netherlands) Michaëlla Krajicek (United States) Maria Sanchez	5–7, 1–6
Win	18–12	Nov 2016	ITF Stellenbosch, South Africa	10,000	Hard	(United States) Kaitlyn Christian	(Zimbabwe) Valeria Bhunu (Sweden) Linnea Malmqvist	6–0, 7–6^{(3)}
Win	19–12	Jan 2017	ITF Wesley Chapel, US	25,000	Clay	(Mexico) Renata Zarazúa	(United States) Elizabeth Halbauer (United States) Sofia Kenin	6–2, 7–6^{(5)}
Loss	19–13	Jul 2017	Stockton Challenger, US	60,000	Hard	(Australia) Tammi Patterson	(United States) Usue Maitane Arconada (United States) Sofia Kenin	6–4, 1–6, [5–10]
Win	20–13	Nov 2017	ITF Stellenbosch, South Africa	15,000	Hard	(Japan) Mana Ayukawa	(United Kingdom) Alicia Barnett (Switzerland) Nina Stadler	6–2, 6–2
Win	21–13	Dec 2017	ITF Stellenbosch	15,000	Hard	(Japan) Mana Ayukawa	(Canada) Petra Januskova (United States) Madeleine Kobelt	7–6^{(3)}, 6–3
Loss	21–14	Apr 2018	ITF Jackson, United States	25,000	Clay	(Italy) Gaia Sanesi	(United States) Sanaz Marand (United States) Whitney Osuigwe	1–6, 3–6
Win	22–14	Apr 2018	Wiesbaden Open, Germany	25,000	Clay	(Belgium) Hélène Scholsen	(Sweden) Cornelia Lister (United States) Sabrina Santamaria	6–3, 2–6, [10–8]
Win	23–14	May 2018	ITF Rome, Italy	25,000	Clay	(Switzerland) Conny Perrin	(Chinese Taipei) Chen Pei-hsuan (Chinese Taipei) Wu Fang-hsien	6–7^{(0)}, 6–1, [10–7]
Loss	23–15	Jun 2018	Bredeney Ladies Open, Germany	25,000	Clay	(Latvia) Diāna Marcinkeviča	(Germany) Katharina Gerlach (Germany) Julia Wachaczyk	4–6, 6–2, [6–10]
Win	24–15	May 2019	ITF Changwon, South Korea	25,000	Hard	(Chinese Taipei) Hsu Chieh-yu	(Chinese Taipei) Lee Ya-hsuan (South Korea) Choi Ji-hee	6–3, 6–4
Win	25–15	May 2019	ITF Goyang, South Korea	25,000	Hard	(Chinese Taipei) Hsu Chieh-yu	(South Korea) Lee So-ra (South Korea) Kim Na-ri	6–1, 6–3
Win	26–15	Jul 2019	ITF Evansville, US	25,000	Hard	(Chinese Taipei) Hsu Chieh-yu	(United States) Pamela Montez (Japan) Haruna Arakawa	6–2, 6–0
Win	27–15	Sep 2019	ITF Sajur, Israel	15,000	Hard	(United Kingdom) Alicia Barnett	(France) Amandine Cazeaux (Canada) Noelly Longi Nsimba	6–4, 6–4
Win	28–15	Sep 2019	ITF Johannesburg, South Africa	15,000	Hard	(France) Caroline Romeo	(United States) Adesuwa Osabuohien (Israel) Tamara Itzhaki	6–1, 6–3
Win	29–15	Oct 2019	ITF Pretoria, South Africa	15,000	Hard	(France) Caroline Romeo	(Netherlands) Merel Hoedt (India) Zeel Desai	w/o
