= Soweto Open =

Defunct tennis tournament
- Event name: Soweto Open
- Location: Johannesburg, South Africa
- Venue: Arthur Ashe Tennis Centre
- Surface: Hard
- Website: Website
ATP Tour
- Category: ATP Challenger Tour
- Draw: 32S/17Q/16D
- Prize money: $100,000+H
WTA Tour
- Category: ITF Women's Circuit 50K+H
- Draw: 32S/32Q/16D
- Prize money: $50,000+H

The Soweto Open was a professional tennis tournament played on outdoor hardcourts. It was part of the ATP Challenger Tour and the ITF Women's Circuit as a $50,000+H event. It was held at the Arthur Ashe Tennis Centre in the Soweto urban area of Johannesburg, South Africa, from 2009 to 2011. The event was not held in 2012 and came back to the ITF Circuit and the ATP Challenger Tour in 2013. In 2013 on the ITF Circuit, the even was downgraded from a $100,000+H to $50,000+H.

== Past finals ==
=== Men's singles ===
Year	Champion	Runner-up	Score
2013	(Canada) Vasek Pospisil	(Poland) Michał Przysiężny	6–7^{(7–9)}, 6–0, 4–1 ret.
2012	not held		
2011	(South Africa) Izak van der Merwe	(South Africa) Rik de Voest	6–7^{(2–7)}, 7–5, 6–3
2010	(Jamaica) Dustin Brown	(South Africa) Izak van der Merwe	7–6^{(7–2)}, 6–3
2009	(France) Fabrice Santoro	(South Africa) Rik de Voest	7–5, 6–4

=== Women's singles ===
Year	Champion	Runner-up	Score
2013	(Hungary) Tímea Babos	(South Africa) Chanel Simmonds	6–7^{(3–7)}, 6–4, 6–1
2012	not held		
2011	(Russia) Valeria Savinykh	(Czech Republic) Petra Cetkovská	6–1, 6–3
2010	(Russia) Nina Bratchikova	(Thailand) Tamarine Tanasugarn	7–5, 7–6^{(7–4)}
2009	(Latvia) Anastasija Sevastova	(Czech Republic) Eva Hrdinová	6–2, 6–2

=== Men's doubles ===
Year	Champions	Runners-up	Score
2013	(India) Prakash Amritraj (United States) Rajeev Ram	(India) Purav Raja (India) Divij Sharan	7–6^{(7–1)}, 7–6^{(7–1)}
2012	not held		
2011	(Germany) Michael Kohlmann (Austria) Alexander Peya	(Germany) Andre Begemann (Australia) Matthew Ebden	6–2, 6–2
2010	(France) Nicolas Mahut (Croatia) Lovro Zovko	(South Africa) Raven Klaasen (South Africa) Izak van der Merwe	6–2, 6–2
2009	(Switzerland) George Bastl (Australia) Chris Guccione	(Russia) Mikhail Elgin (Russia) Alexander Kudryavtsev	6–2, 4–6, [11–9]

=== Women's doubles ===
Year	Champions	Runners-up	Score
2013	(Poland) Magda Linette (South Africa) Chanel Simmonds	(United Kingdom) Samantha Murray (United Kingdom) Jade Windley	6–1, 6–3
2012	not held		
2011	play cancelled due to heavy rain and flooding		
2010	(Russia) Vitalia Diatchenko (Greece) Eirini Georgatou	(New Zealand) Marina Erakovic (Thailand) Tamarine Tanasugarn	6–3, 5–7, [16–14]
2009	(United Kingdom) Naomi Cavaday (Ukraine) Lesia Tsurenko	(Slovakia) Kristína Kučová (Latvia) Anastasija Sevastova	6–2, 2–6, [11–9]
