= 2018 Stockton Challenger – Men's doubles =

Men's doubles
- 2018 Stockton Challenger

Final
- Champions: (Barbados) Darian King (United States) Noah Rubin
- Runners-up: (Thailand) Sanchai Ratiwatana (Indonesia) Christopher Rungkat
- Score: 6–3, 6–4

Events
Singles	men	women
Doubles	men	women
← 2017 ·	Stockton Challenger	· 2019 →

Brydan Klein and Joe Salisbury were the defending champions but chose not to defend their title.

Darian King and Noah Rubin won the title after defeating Sanchai Ratiwatana and Christopher Rungkat 6–3, 6–4 in the final.^{(12–10)}.

== Seeds ==
1. (Thailand) Sanchai Ratiwatana / (Indonesia) Christopher Rungkat (final)
2. (South Africa) Ruan Roelofse / (Australia) John-Patrick Smith (first round)
3. (Philippines) Ruben Gonzales / (United States) Nathaniel Lammons (first round)
4. (Japan) Toshihide Matsui / (Denmark) Frederik Nielsen (semifinals)

== Draw ==
Key

- Q = Qualifier
- WC = Wild card
- LL = Lucky loser
- Alt = Alternate
- ITF = ITF entry
- PR = Protected ranking
- SR = Special ranking
- SE = Special exempt
- JE = Junior exempt
- JR = Junior Accelerator Programme entrant
- CO = College Accelerator Programme entrant
- NG = Next Gen Accelerator Program entrant
- w/o = Walkover
- r = Retired
- d = Defaulted

First round
1	(Thailand) Sa Ratiwatana (Indonesia) C Rungkat	6	6
WC	(United States) T Paul (United States) A Reed	3	3
(United Kingdom) J Clarke (Venezuela) R Maytín	4	3
WC	(United States) JP Fruttero (United States) P Kypson	6	6
4	(Japan) T Matsui (Denmark) F Nielsen	7^{9}	6
(Switzerland) M-A Hüsler (Austria) L Miedler	6^{7}	2
WC	(Egypt) Akram El Sallaly (Sweden) A Göransson	6	3	[10]
(Australia) M Banes (Australia) A Bolt	1	6	[8]
(Mexico) H Hach Verdugo (Sweden) A Siljeström	6	4	[6]
(Barbados) D King (United States) N Rubin	3	6	[10]
(Australia) M Polmans (Netherlands) S Verbeek	2	6	[10]
3	(Philippines) R Gonzales (United States) N Lammons	6	3	[4]
(United States) JC Aragone (South Africa) L Harris	3	6^{5}
(United States) A Lawson (United States) H Reese	6	7^{7}
(Finland) H Heliövaara (Switzerland) H Laaksonen	6	6
2	(South Africa) R Roelofse (Australia) J-P Smith	4	3

Quarterfinals
1	(Thailand) Sa Ratiwatana (Indonesia) C Rungkat	6	6
WC	(United States) JP Fruttero (United States) P Kypson	4	2
4	(Japan) T Matsui (Denmark) F Nielsen	6	6
WC	(Egypt) A El Sallaly (Sweden) A Göransson	3	4
(Barbados) D King (United States) N Rubin	6	4	[10]
(Australia) M Polmans (Netherlands) S Verbeek	1	6	[8]
(United States) A Lawson (United States) H Reese	6^{5}	7^{7}	[8]
(Finland) H Heliövaara (Switzerland) H Laaksonen	7^{7}	6^{3}	[10]

Semifinals
1	(Thailand) Sa Ratiwatana (Indonesia) C Rungkat	5	6	[10]
4	(Japan) T Matsui (Denmark) F Nielsen	7	1	[8]
(Barbados) D King (United States) N Rubin	6	6
(Finland) H Heliövaara (Switzerland) H Laaksonen	4	4

Final
1	(Thailand) Sa Ratiwatana (Indonesia) C Rungkat	3	4
(Barbados) D King (United States) N Rubin	6	6
