= 2018 Stockton Challenger – Men's singles =

Men's singles
- 2018 Stockton Challenger

Final
- Champion: (South Africa) Lloyd Harris
- Runner-up: (Australia) Marc Polmans
- Score: 6–2, 6–2

Events
Singles	men	women
Doubles	men	women
← 2017 ·	Stockton Challenger	· 2019 →

Cameron Norrie was the defending champion but chose not to defend his title.

Lloyd Harris won the title after defeating Marc Polmans 6–2, 6–2 in the final.

== Seeds ==
1. (Australia) Jordan Thompson (semifinals)
2. (United States) Reilly Opelka (first round)
3. (Switzerland) Henri Laaksonen (first round)
4. (South Africa) Lloyd Harris (champion)
5. (Norway) Casper Ruud (second round)
6. (United States) Noah Rubin (quarterfinals)
7. (Australia) Alex Bolt (second round)
8. (Australia) Marc Polmans (final)

== Draw ==
Key

- Q = Qualifier
- WC = Wild card
- LL = Lucky loser
- Alt = Alternate
- ITF = ITF entry
- PR = Protected ranking
- SR = Special ranking
- SE = Special exempt
- JE = Junior exempt
- JR = Junior Accelerator Programme entrant
- CO = College Accelerator Programme entrant
- NG = Next Gen Accelerator Program entrant
- w/o = Walkover
- r = Retired
- d = Defaulted

=== Finals ===
Semifinals
1	(Australia) Jordan Thompson	6^{6}	2
4	(South Africa) Lloyd Harris	7^{8}	6
8	(Australia) Marc Polmans	6	6
(France) Maxime Janvier	1	4

Final
4	(South Africa) Lloyd Harris	6	6
8	(Australia) Marc Polmans	2	2

=== Top half ===
First round
1	(Australia) J Thompson	6	6
Q	(United States) P Kypson	2	2
Alt	(Japan) K Uchida	6	6^{3}	6
Q	(United States) T Paul	1	7^{7}	0
Q	(United States) W Blumberg	3	6	6
(United States) JC Aragone	6	2	2
WC	(United States) J Brooksby	2	4
6	(United States) N Rubin	6	6
4	(South Africa) L Harris	6	6
(Germany) D Köpfer	3	4
WC	(United States) T-S Kwiatkowski	3	7^{7}	6
(Austria) L Miedler	6	6^{5}	4
(United States) C Eubanks	6	7^{7}
(Turkey) C İlkel	4	6^{4}
(Germany) J Choinski	3	0
5	(Norway) C Ruud	6	6

Second round
1	(Australia) J Thompson	4	6	6
Alt	(Japan) K Uchida	6	3	1
Q	(United States) W Blumberg	1	6	4
6	(United States) N Rubin	6	4	6
4	(South Africa) L Harris	6	6
WC	(United States) T-S Kwiatkowski	2	4
(United States) C Eubanks	6	7^{10}
5	(Norway) C Ruud	1	6^{8}

Quarterfinals
1	(Australia) J Thompson	6^{4}	7^{7}	6
6	(United States) N Rubin	7^{7}	6^{2}	3
4	(South Africa) L Harris	6^{6}	6	6
(United States) C Eubanks	7^{8}	4	3

Semifinals
1	(Australia) J Thompson	6^{6}	2
4	(South Africa) L Harris	7^{8}	6

=== Bottom half ===
First round
8	(Australia) M Polmans	6	6
(United Kingdom) J Clarke	3	0
(United States) M Krueger	3	6	6
(Australia) J-P Smith	6	3	4
(United Kingdom) D Evans	6	6
SE	(Australia) J Duckworth	2	2
(United Kingdom) L Broady	3	6	6
3	(Switzerland) H Laaksonen	6	4	4
7	(Australia) A Bolt	6	6
WC	(United States) T Fawcett	4	1
(Barbados) D King	6	6
WC	(Denmark) Philip Hjorth	1	1
Q	(United States) A Sarkissian	6	6^{4}	6
(Australia) M Banes	4	7^{7}	1
(France) M Janvier	6^{4}	6	6
2	(United States) R Opelka	7^{7}	4	4

Second round
8	(Australia) M Polmans	6^{4}	6	6
(United States) M Krueger	7^{7}	4	3
(United Kingdom) D Evans	0	7^{7}	4
(United Kingdom) L Broady	6	6^{3}	6
7	(Australia) A Bolt	4	3
(Barbados) D King	6	6
Q	(United States) A Sarkissian	6^{1}	0
(France) M Janvier	7^{7}	6

Quarterfinals
8	(Australia) M Polmans	4	6	6
(United Kingdom) L Broady	6	4	2
(Barbados) D King	5	7	6^{3}
(France) M Janvier	7	5	7^{7}

Semifinals
8	(Australia) M Polmans	6	6
(France) M Janvier	1	4
