= 2017 Stockton ATP Challenger – Singles =

Singles
- 2017 Stockton ATP Challenger

Final
- Champion: (United Kingdom) Cameron Norrie
- Runner-up: (Barbados) Darian King
- Score: 6–1, 6–3

Events
Singles	Doubles
- Stockton ATP Challenger

Frances Tiafoe was the defending champion but chose not to defend his title.

Cameron Norrie won the title after defeating Darian King 6–1, 6–3 in the final.

== Seeds ==
1. (Belgium) Ruben Bemelmans (first round)
2. (United States) Tennys Sandgren (quarterfinals)
3. (United States) Michael Mmoh (semifinals)
4. (United States) Stefan Kozlov (quarterfinals)
5. (India) Ramkumar Ramanathan (first round)
6. (Barbados) Darian King (final)
7. (Canada) Félix Auger-Aliassime (first round)
8. (United Kingdom) Cameron Norrie (champion)

== Draw ==
Key

- Q = Qualifier
- WC = Wild card
- LL = Lucky loser
- Alt = Alternate
- ITF = ITF entry
- PR = Protected ranking
- SR = Special ranking
- SE = Special exempt
- JE = Junior exempt
- JR = Junior Accelerator Programme entrant
- CO = College Accelerator Programme entrant
- NG = Next Gen Accelerator Program entrant
- w/o = Walkover
- r = Retired
- d = Defaulted

=== Finals ===
Semifinals
(United States) Tim Smyczek	1	4
6	(Barbados) Darian King	6	6
3	(United States) Michael Mmoh	5	2
8	(United Kingdom) Cameron Norrie	7	6

Final
6	(Barbados) Darian King	1	3
8	(United Kingdom) Cameron Norrie	6	6

=== Top half ===
First round
1	(Belgium) R Bemelmans	5	3
(Sweden) E Ymer	7	6
PR	(Canada) F Dancevic	6	6
Q	(United States) S Bangoura	4	0
Q	(Denmark) F Nielsen	2	5
(United States) T Smyczek	6	7
(United States) C Harrison	6	6
5	(India) R Ramanathan	1	2
4/Alt	(United States) S Kozlov	6	6
(Canada) B Schnur	3	2
WC	(United States) D Kudla	6	6
Q	(Germany) J Choinski	0	3
WC	(Egypt) Akram El Sallaly	2	3
(United States) N Rubin	6	6
PR	(United Kingdom) A Ward	5	6^{2}
6	(Barbados) D King	7	7^{7}

Second round
(Sweden) E Ymer	3	7^{10}	6
PR	(Canada) F Dancevic	6	6^{8}	4
(United States) T Smyczek	2	6	6
(United States) C Harrison	6	3	4
4/Alt	(United States) S Kozlov	6	6
WC	(United States) D Kudla	4	4
(United States) N Rubin	6	1	2
6	(Barbados) D King	2	6	6

Quarterfinals
(Sweden) E Ymer	4	4
(United States) T Smyczek	6	6
4/Alt	(United States) S Kozlov	4	4
6	(Barbados) D King	6	6

Semifinals
(United States) T Smyczek	1	4
6	(Barbados) D King	6	6

=== Bottom half ===
First round
7	(Canada) F Auger-Aliassime	2	2
Q	(Russia) D Tursunov	6	6
(Australia) J-P Smith	6	6
(Canada) F Peliwo	2	3
(United States) M McDonald	6	4	6
WC	(Sweden) A Göransson	2	6	2
(Germany) T Kamke	2	1
3	(United States) M Mmoh	6	6
8	(United Kingdom) C Norrie	6	6
WC	(United States) D Baughman	3	1
(Czech Republic) J Šátral	2	2
(United Kingdom) B Klein	6	6
(United States) M Krueger	6^{7}	1
(United Kingdom) L Broady	7^{9}	6
(Australia) C O'Connell	5	5
2	(United States) T Sandgren	7	7

Second round
Q	(Russia) D Tursunov	7^{7}	6
(Australia) J-P Smith	6^{2}	3
(United States) M McDonald	6	2	6^{4}
3	(United States) M Mmoh	1	6	7^{7}
8	(United Kingdom) C Norrie	4	7^{7}	6
(United Kingdom) B Klein	6	6^{1}	4
(United Kingdom) L Broady	6^{7}	4
2	(United States) T Sandgren	7^{9}	6

Quarterfinals
Q	(Russia) D Tursunov	3	0^{r}
3	(United States) M Mmoh	6	0
8	(United Kingdom) C Norrie	6	7^{7}
2	(United States) T Sandgren	3	6^{5}

Semifinals
3	(United States) M Mmoh	5	2
8	(United Kingdom) C Norrie	7	6
