= Zurita (surname) =

Zurita is an Aragonese surname. Notable people with the surname include:

- Carlos Zurita, Duke of Soria (born 1943), Spanish academic
- Christian Rodrigo Zurita (born 1979), Argentine footballer
- Elias Zurita (born 1964), American soccer player
- Enrique Zurita, Chilean judge
- Humberto Zurita (born 1954), Mexican actor, film director and producer
- Irving Zurita (born 1991), Mexican footballer
- Jerónimo Zurita y Castro (1512–1580), Spanish historian
- Juan Zurita (1917–2000), Mexican boxer
- Manuel Fernando Zurita, Nicaraguan politician and President
- Maribel Zurita (born 1979), American boxer
- Raúl Zurita (born 1950), Chilean poet
- Ricardo Zurita (born 1959), American architect
- Sebastián Zurita (born 1986), Mexican actor
- Victoria Zárate Zurita (1893–1964), Spanish teacher and trade unionist

== See also ==
- Leonardo Valdés Zurita, Mexican scholar
