= 2018 Stockton Challenger =

- Date: 1–7 October
- Edition: 3rd (men); 4th (women)
- Category: ITF Women's Circuit
- Prize money: $100,000 (men) $60,000 (women)
- Surface: Hard
- Location: Stockton, United States

Champions

Men's singles
- (South Africa) Lloyd Harris

Women's singles
- (United States) Madison Brengle

Men's doubles
- (Barbados) Darian King / (United States) Noah Rubin

Women's doubles
- (United States) Hayley Carter / (United States) Ena Shibahara
← 2017 ·	Stockton Challenger	· 2019 →

The 2018 Stockton Challenger was a professional tennis tournament played on outdoor hard courts. It was the third and fourth editions of the tournament and was part of the 2018 ATP Challenger Tour and the 2018 ITF Women's Circuit. It took place in Stockton, United States, on 1–7 October 2018.

== Men's singles main draw entrants ==
=== Seeds ===
Country	Player	Rank^{1}	Seed
AUS	Jordan Thompson	106	1
USA	Reilly Opelka	125	2
SUI	Henri Laaksonen	128	3
RSA	Lloyd Harris	129	4
NOR	Casper Ruud	136	5
USA	Noah Rubin	138	6
AUS	Alex Bolt	162	7
AUS	Marc Polmans	165	8

- ^{1} Rankings are as of September 24, 2018.

=== Other entrants ===
The following players received wildcards into the singles main draw:

- (United States) Jenson Brooksby
- (United States) Tom Fawcett
- (Denmark) Philip Hjorth
- (United States) Thai-Son Kwiatkowski

The following player received entry into the singles main draw as a special exempt:

- (Australia) James Duckworth

The following player received entry into the singles main draw as an alternate:

- (Japan) Kaichi Uchida

The following players received entry from the qualifying draw:

- (United States) William Blumberg
- (United States) Patrick Kypson
- (United States) Tommy Paul
- (United States) Alexander Sarkissian

== Women's singles main draw entrants ==
=== Seeds ===
Country	Player	Rank^{1}	Seed
USA	Madison Brengle	95	1
USA	Jessica Pegula	136	2
RUS	Sofya Zhuk	137	3
CZE	Marie Bouzková	147	4
USA	Kristie Ahn	149	5
USA	Jamie Loeb	177	6
BRA	Beatriz Haddad Maia	196	7
USA	Lauren Davis	249	8

- ^{1} Rankings as of 1 October 2018.

=== Other entrants ===
The following players received a wildcard into the singles main draw:

- (United States) Hayley Carter
- (United States) Victoria Duval
- (United States) Jamie Loeb
- (United States) Danielle Willson

The following players received entry into the singles main draw using a junior exempt:

- (United States) Whitney Osuigwe

The following players received entry from the qualifying draw:

- (United States) Maegan Manasse
- (United States) Sanaz Marand
- (Switzerland) Amra Sadiković
- (United States) Katie Volynets

The following player received entry as a lucky loser:

- (United States) Jennifer Elie

== Champions ==
=== Men's singles ===
- (South Africa) Lloyd Harris def. (Australia) Marc Polmans 6–2, 6–2.

=== Women's singles ===
- (United States) Madison Brengle def. (United States) Danielle Lao, 7–5, 7–6^{(12–10)}

=== Men's doubles ===
- (Barbados) Darian King / (United States) Noah Rubin def. (Thailand) Sanchai Ratiwatana / (Indonesia) Christopher Rungkat 6–3, 6–4.

=== Women's doubles ===
- (United States) Hayley Carter / (United States) Ena Shibahara def. (United States) Quinn Gleason / (Brazil) Luisa Stefani, 7–5, 5–7, [10–7]
