= 2016 Stockton ATP Challenger =

- Date: 1 October – 9 October
- Edition: 1st
- Surface: Hard
- Location: Stockton, California, United States

Champions

Singles
- (United States) Frances Tiafoe

Doubles
- (United States) Brian Baker / (Australia) Sam Groth
Stockton ATP Challenger	· 2017 →

The 2016 Stockton ATP Challenger was a professional tennis tournament played on hard courts. It was the first edition of the tournament which was part of the 2016 ATP Challenger Tour. It took place in Stockton, California, United States between 1 October and 9 October 2016.

== Singles main-draw entrants ==
=== Seeds ===
Country	Player	Rank^{1}	Seed
USA	Bjorn Fratangelo	109	1
USA	Tim Smyczek	118	2
USA	Frances Tiafoe	121	3
COL	Santiago Giraldo	129	4
USA	Denis Kudla	131	5
ITA	Alessandro Giannessi	144	6
USA	Dennis Novikov	148	7
FRA	Quentin Halys	160	8

- ^{1} Rankings are as of September 26, 2016.

=== Other entrants ===
The following players received wildcards into the singles main draw:

- (Ecuador) José Chamba Gómez
- (United States) Nicolas Meister
- (United States) Brian Baker
- (Netherlands) Sem Verbeek

The following players received entry using a special exempt into the singles main draw:

- (United States) Mackenzie McDonald
- (United States) Michael Mmoh

The following players received entry from the qualifying draw:

- (United Kingdom) Brydan Klein
- (Italy) Salvatore Caruso
- (United States) Dennis Nevolo
- (Denmark) Frederik Nielsen

== Champions ==
=== Singles ===
- (United States) Frances Tiafoe def. (United States) Noah Rubin, 6–4, 6–2.

=== Doubles ===
- (United States) Brian Baker / (Australia) Sam Groth def. (Australia) Matt Reid / (Australia) John-Patrick Smith, 6–2, 4–6, [10–2].
