= Zurita =

Zurita may refer to:

- Zurita, Cantabria, a village in Cantabria, Spain
- Zurita (surname), a surname (and list of people with the surname)
