= 2016 Stockton ATP Challenger – Doubles =

Doubles
- 2016 Stockton ATP Challenger

Final
- Champions: (United States) Brian Baker (Australia) Sam Groth
- Runners-up: (Australia) Matt Reid (Australia) John-Patrick Smith
- Score: 6–2, 4–6, [10–2]

Events
Singles	Doubles
- Stockton ATP Challenger

This was the first edition of the tournament.

Brian Baker and Sam Groth won the title after defeating Matt Reid and John-Patrick Smith 6–2, 4–6, [10–2] in the final.

== Seeds ==
1. (Argentina) Andrés Molteni / (Chile) Hans Podlipnik (first round)
2. (United States) Brian Baker / (Australia) Sam Groth (champions)
3. (Mexico) Miguel Ángel Reyes-Varela / (United States) Max Schnur (semifinals)
4. (Australia) Matt Reid / (Australia) John-Patrick Smith (final)

== Draw ==
Key

- Q = Qualifier
- WC = Wild card
- LL = Lucky loser
- Alt = Alternate
- ITF = ITF entry
- PR = Protected ranking
- SR = Special ranking
- SE = Special exempt
- JE = Junior exempt
- JR = Junior Accelerator Programme entrant
- CO = College Accelerator Programme entrant
- NG = Next Gen Accelerator Program entrant
- w/o = Walkover
- r = Retired
- d = Defaulted

First round
1	(Argentina) A Molteni (Chile) H Podlipnik	6^{4}	6	[5]
WC	(Ecuador) José Chamba Gómez (Netherlands) S Verbeek	7^{7}	2	[10]
WC	(United States) B Fratangelo (United States) T Paul	6	6
(Canada) P Bester (Canada) P Polansky	0	2
4	(Australia) M Reid (Australia) J-P Smith	6	6
PR	(India) Y Bhambri (United States) JP Fruttero	2	4
(France) Q Halys (United States) D Novikov	6	6
Q	(Slovenia) B Rola (Slovenia) G Žemlja	1	2
(United States) S Bangoura (Republic of Ireland) D O'Hare	7	6
(Australia) S de Waard (United States) F Tiafoe	5	3
WC	(United States) M McDonald (New Zealand) B McLachlan	4	5
3	(Mexico) MÁ Reyes-Varela (United States) M Schnur	6	7
(South Africa) D O'Brien (South Africa) R Roelofse	6^{5}	4
(El Salvador) M Arévalo (United Kingdom) B Klein	7^{7}	6
(Italy) A Giannessi (Argentina) M Trungelliti	3	1
2	(United States) B Baker (Australia) S Groth	6	6

Quarterfinals
WC	(Ecuador) J Chamba Gómez (Netherlands) S Verbeek	6	5	[10]
WC	(United States) B Fratangelo (United States) T Paul	4	7	[6]
4	(Australia) M Reid (Australia) J-P Smith	6	3	[10]
(France) Q Halys (United States) D Novikov	4	6	[7]
(United States) S Bangoura (Republic of Ireland) D O'Hare	3	5
3	(Mexico) MÁ Reyes-Varela (United States) M Schnur	6	7
(El Salvador) M Arévalo (United Kingdom) B Klein	2	4
2	(United States) B Baker (Australia) S Groth	6	6

Semifinals
WC	(Ecuador) J Chamba Gómez (Netherlands) S Verbeek	4	3
4	(Australia) M Reid (Australia) J-P Smith	6	6
3	(Mexico) MÁ Reyes-Varela (United States) M Schnur	2	4
2	(United States) B Baker (Australia) S Groth	6	6

Final
4	(Australia) M Reid (Australia) J-P Smith	2	6	[2]
2	(United States) B Baker (Australia) S Groth	6	4	[10]
