= 2016 Stockton ATP Challenger – Singles =

Singles
- 2016 Stockton ATP Challenger

Final
- Champion: (United States) Frances Tiafoe
- Runner-up: (United States) Noah Rubin
- Score: 6–4, 6–2

Events
Singles	Doubles
- Stockton ATP Challenger

This was the first edition of the tournament.

Frances Tiafoe won the title after defeating Noah Rubin 6–4, 6–2 in the final.

== Seeds ==
1. (United States) Bjorn Fratangelo (first round)
2. (United States) Tim Smyczek (second round)
3. (United States) Frances Tiafoe (champion)
4. (Colombia) Santiago Giraldo (first round)
5. (United States) Denis Kudla (quarterfinals)
6. (Italy) Alessandro Giannessi (quarterfinals)
7. (United States) Dennis Novikov (first round)
8. (France) Quentin Halys (first round)

== Draw ==
Key

- Q = Qualifier
- WC = Wild card
- LL = Lucky loser
- Alt = Alternate
- ITF = ITF entry
- PR = Protected ranking
- SR = Special ranking
- SE = Special exempt
- JE = Junior exempt
- JR = Junior Accelerator Programme entrant
- CO = College Accelerator Programme entrant
- NG = Next Gen Accelerator Program entrant
- w/o = Walkover
- r = Retired
- d = Defaulted

=== Finals ===
Semifinals
(United States) Noah Rubin	6	6
SE	(United States) Michael Mmoh	2	3
3	(United States) Frances Tiafoe	7^{7}	6
SE	(United States) Mackenzie McDonald	6^{4}	3

Final
(United States) Noah Rubin	4	2
3	(United States) Frances Tiafoe	6	6

=== Top half ===
First round
1	(United States) B Fratangelo	6	3	5
(Belgium) J De Loore	3	6	7
(Brazil) G Clezar	6	3	3
(United States) N Rubin	2	6	6
(United States) T Paul	2	2
(Canada) F Dancevic	6	6
Q	(United Kingdom) B Klein	2	6	6
8	(France) Q Halys	6	4	1
4	(Colombia) S Giraldo	3	6	4
(El Salvador) M Arévalo	6	2	6
(United States) S Bangoura	0	3
(Barbados) D King	6	6
(Colombia) A González	3	1
SE	(United States) M Mmoh	6	6
Q	(Italy) S Caruso	6	6
7	(United States) D Novikov	2	3

Second round
(Belgium) J De Loore	5	6	1
(United States) N Rubin	7	3	6
(Canada) F Dancevic	6	6
Q	(United Kingdom) B Klein	4	4
(El Salvador) M Arévalo	6	3	3
(Barbados) D King	2	6	6
SE	(United States) M Mmoh	6	6
Q	(Italy) S Caruso	3	2

Quarterfinals
(United States) N Rubin	4	6	6
(Canada) F Dancevic	6	2	3
(Barbados) D King	4	4
SE	(United States) M Mmoh	6	6

Semifinals
(United States) N Rubin	6	6
SE	(United States) M Mmoh	2	3

=== Bottom half ===
First round
6	(Italy) A Giannessi	6	6
WC	(Ecuador) José Chamba Gómez	1	4
(United States) D Nguyen	2	6	6
(India) Y Bhambri	6	4	3
Q	(United States) Dennis Nevolo	6	6
Q	(Denmark) F Nielsen	4	2
(Slovenia) B Rola	6	5	3
3	(United States) F Tiafoe	3	7	6
5	(United States) D Kudla	7^{9}	6
WC	(United States) N Meister	6^{7}	2
(Canada) P Polansky	6^{3}	6	5
WC	(United States) B Baker	7^{7}	3	7
SE	(United States) M McDonald	6	6
WC	(Netherlands) S Verbeek	2	2
(Slovenia) G Žemlja	4	6	1
2	(United States) T Smyczek	6	3	6

Second round
6	(Italy) A Giannessi	4	7	7
(United States) D Nguyen	6	5	5
Q	(United States) D Nevolo	6^{6}	3
3	(United States) F Tiafoe	7^{8}	6
5	(United States) D Kudla	5	6	7
WC	(United States) B Baker	7	4	5
SE	(United States) M McDonald	6	6
2	(United States) T Smyczek	4	4

Quarterfinals
6	(Italy) A Giannessi	6^{6}	3
3	(United States) F Tiafoe	7^{7}	6
5	(United States) D Kudla	6	6^{1}	4
SE	(United States) M McDonald	3	7^{7}	6

Semifinals
3	(United States) F Tiafoe	7^{7}	6
SE	(United States) M McDonald	6^{4}	3
