= 2017 Stockton ATP Challenger – Doubles =

Doubles
- 2017 Stockton ATP Challenger

Final
- Champions: (United Kingdom) Brydan Klein (United Kingdom) Joe Salisbury
- Runners-up: (United States) Denis Kudla (Latvia) Miķelis Lībietis
- Score: 6–2, 6–4

Events
Singles	Doubles
- Stockton ATP Challenger

Brian Baker and Sam Groth were the defending champions but chose not to defend their title.

Brydan Klein and Joe Salisbury won the title after defeating Denis Kudla and Miķelis Lībietis 6–2, 6–4 in the final.

== Seeds ==
1. (United Kingdom) Neal Skupski / (Australia) John-Patrick Smith (semifinals)
2. (South Africa) Ruan Roelofse / (Sweden) Andreas Siljeström (first round)
3. (United Kingdom) Luke Bambridge / (Republic of Ireland) David O'Hare (first round)
4. (United Kingdom) Brydan Klein / (United Kingdom) Joe Salisbury (champions)

== Draw ==
Key

- Q = Qualifier
- WC = Wild card
- LL = Lucky loser
- Alt = Alternate
- ITF = ITF entry
- PR = Protected ranking
- SR = Special ranking
- SE = Special exempt
- JE = Junior exempt
- JR = Junior Accelerator Programme entrant
- CO = College Accelerator Programme entrant
- NG = Next Gen Accelerator Program entrant
- w/o = Walkover
- r = Retired
- d = Defaulted

First round
1	(United Kingdom) N Skupski (Australia) J-P Smith	5	6	[10]
(United States) S Bangoura (Barbados) D King	7	3	[2]
(Canada) F Auger-Aliassime (Canada) B Schnur	3	2
(United States) S Kozlov (Denmark) F Nielsen	6	6
4	(United Kingdom) B Klein (United Kingdom) J Salisbury	7	6
WC	(Egypt) Akram El Sallaly (Brazil) Bernardo Oliveira	5	4
(Serbia) N Milojević (Czech Republic) J Šátral	6	6
WC	(United States) J Brooksby (United States) Boris Kozlov	1	3
(United States) M Krueger (United States) M McDonald	6	6
PR	(Belgium) R Bemelmans (Canada) F Dancevic	4	0
WC	(United States) D Baughman (United States) A Halebian	7^{9}	7
3	(United Kingdom) L Bambridge (Republic of Ireland) D O'Hare	6^{7}	5
Q	(United States) D Kudla (Latvia) M Lībietis	6	6
(United States) T Sandgren (United States) T Smyczek	4	3
(Mexico) H Hach Verdugo (India) R Ramanathan	6	1	[10]
2	(South Africa) R Roelofse (Sweden) A Siljeström	4	6	[8]

Quarterfinals
1	(United Kingdom) N Skupski (Australia) J-P Smith	6	6^{3}	[10]
(United States) S Kozlov (Denmark) F Nielsen	4	7^{7}	[5]
4	(United Kingdom) B Klein (United Kingdom) J Salisbury	6	6
(Serbia) N Milojević (Czech Republic) J Šátral	3	4
(United States) M Krueger (United States) M McDonald	5	6	[13]
WC	(United States) D Baughman (United States) A Halebian	7	2	[11]
Q	(United States) D Kudla (Latvia) M Lībietis	7^{7}	6
(Mexico) H Hach Verdugo (India) R Ramanathan	6^{5}	4

Semifinals
1	(United Kingdom) N Skupski (Australia) J-P Smith	6^{7}	6^{5}
4	(United Kingdom) B Klein (United Kingdom) J Salisbury	7^{9}	7^{7}
(United States) M Krueger (United States) M McDonald	2	2
Q	(United States) D Kudla (Latvia) M Lībietis	6	6

Final
4	(United Kingdom) B Klein (United Kingdom) J Salisbury	6	6
Q	(United States) D Kudla (Latvia) M Lībietis	2	4
