= Ricardo Zurita =

American architect

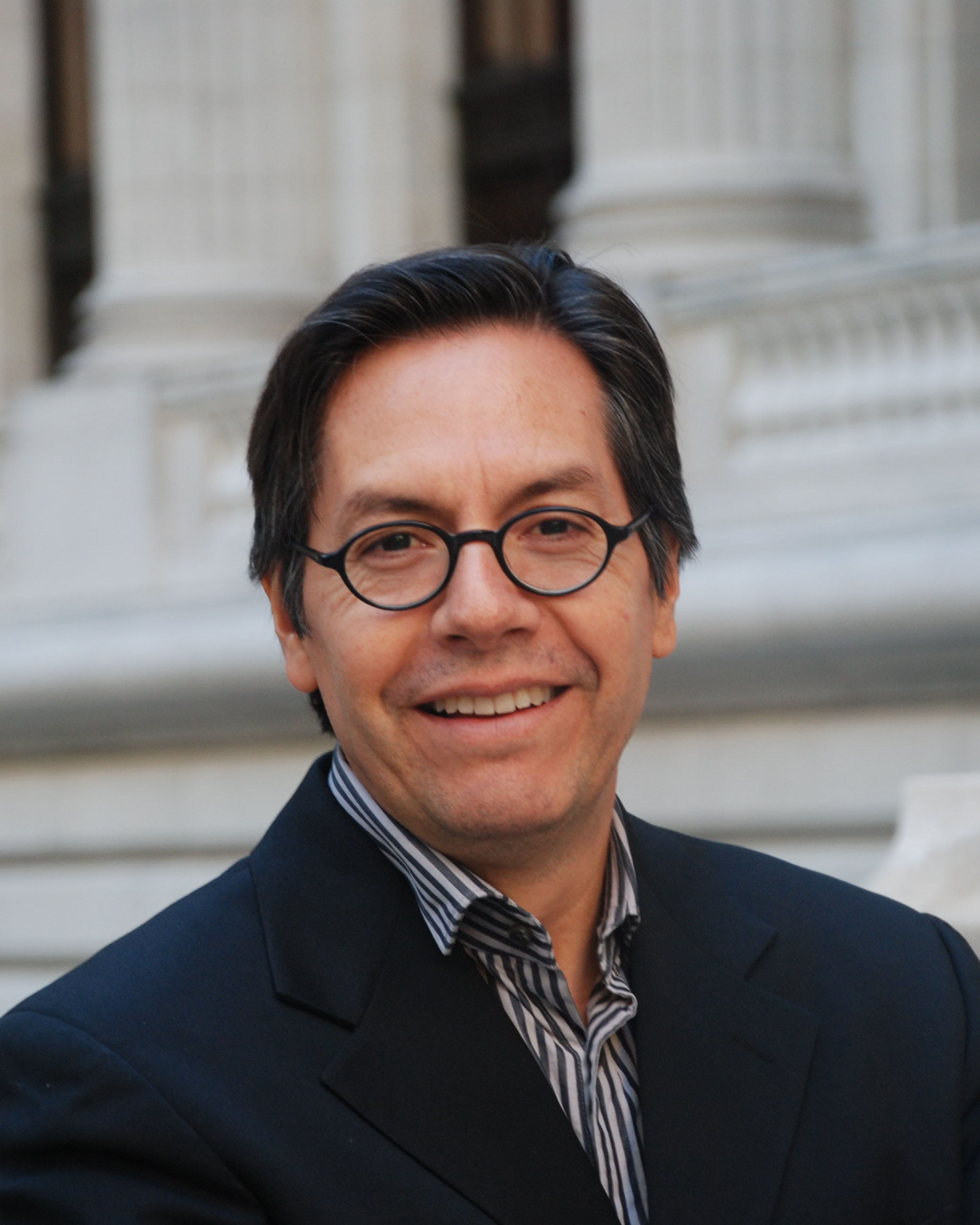
- Zurita in 2013
- Born: 1959 (age 66–67); Ecuador
- Education: Cornell University
- Occupation: Architect
- Practice: Ricardo Zurita Architecture and Planning, P.C.

Ricardo Zurita (born 1959) is an American architect and the founder of the design firm Ricardo Zurita Architecture and Planning, P.C. (RZAPS).

== Early life and education ==
Zurita was born in Quito, Ecuador, and moved to New York City at the age of five. He attended Stuyvesant High School and then the College of Architecture, Art, and Planning at Cornell University, where he graduated with a Bachelor of Architecture in 1984.

== Career ==
After graduating from Cornell, he practiced in New York City, including tenures with Rafael Viñoly Architects and Beyer Blinder Belle, and in Madrid, Spain as a designer for the National Training Center for the 1992 Summer Olympics. In 2002, he founded his eponymous firm RZAPS, located in New York.

== Notable works ==
Ricardo Zurita has designed a variety of projects with public impact at a wide spectrum of scale and type, including master planning, buildings, outdoor spaces, interiors and public art. He is most recognized for his long term involvement as lead architect for the Redevelopment of Randall's Island, the largest public park project in New York City in over a half century. Authoring the master plan, Zurita designed a number of buildings on the island, the most notable of them being Icahn Stadium and the Sportime Randall's Island Tennis Center that serves as the venue for the John McEnroe Tennis Academy. Additionally, on the island he designed public comfort stations, a power substation, a nature education center, maintenance buildings and redesigned the access ramp from the Robert F. Kennedy Triborough Bridge to the island.

Other projects of significant public impact include the renovation of the urban park at One Penn Plaza in midtown Manhattan, the redevelopment of the NYC Parks-owned Douglaston Manor as a conference and banquet center, the Tennis Center at Lake Isle Park in Eastchester NY, and the design for the Courtland/McGill Bridge in Atlanta GA.

== Gallery ==
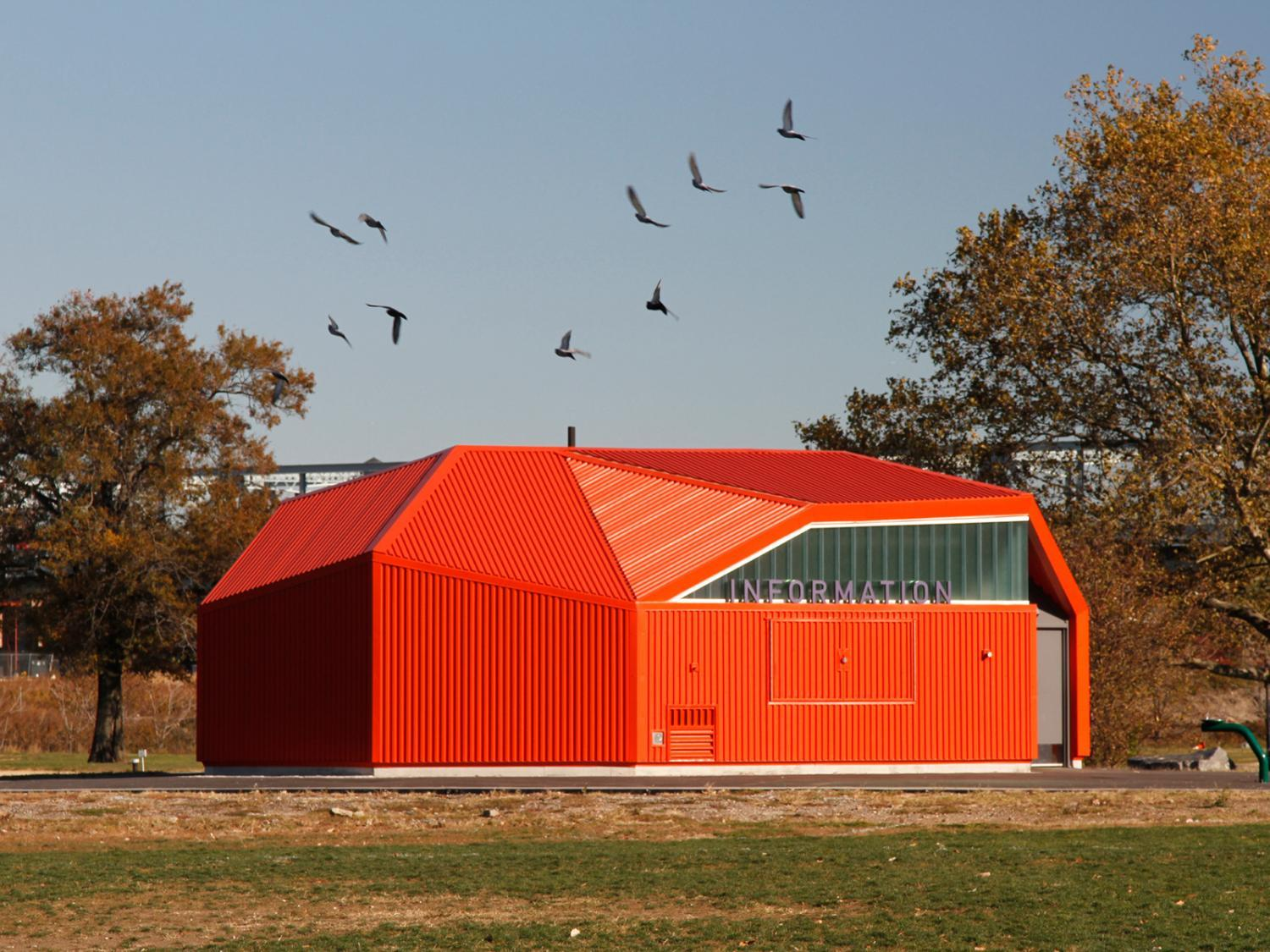
Comfort Station on Randall's Island, New York

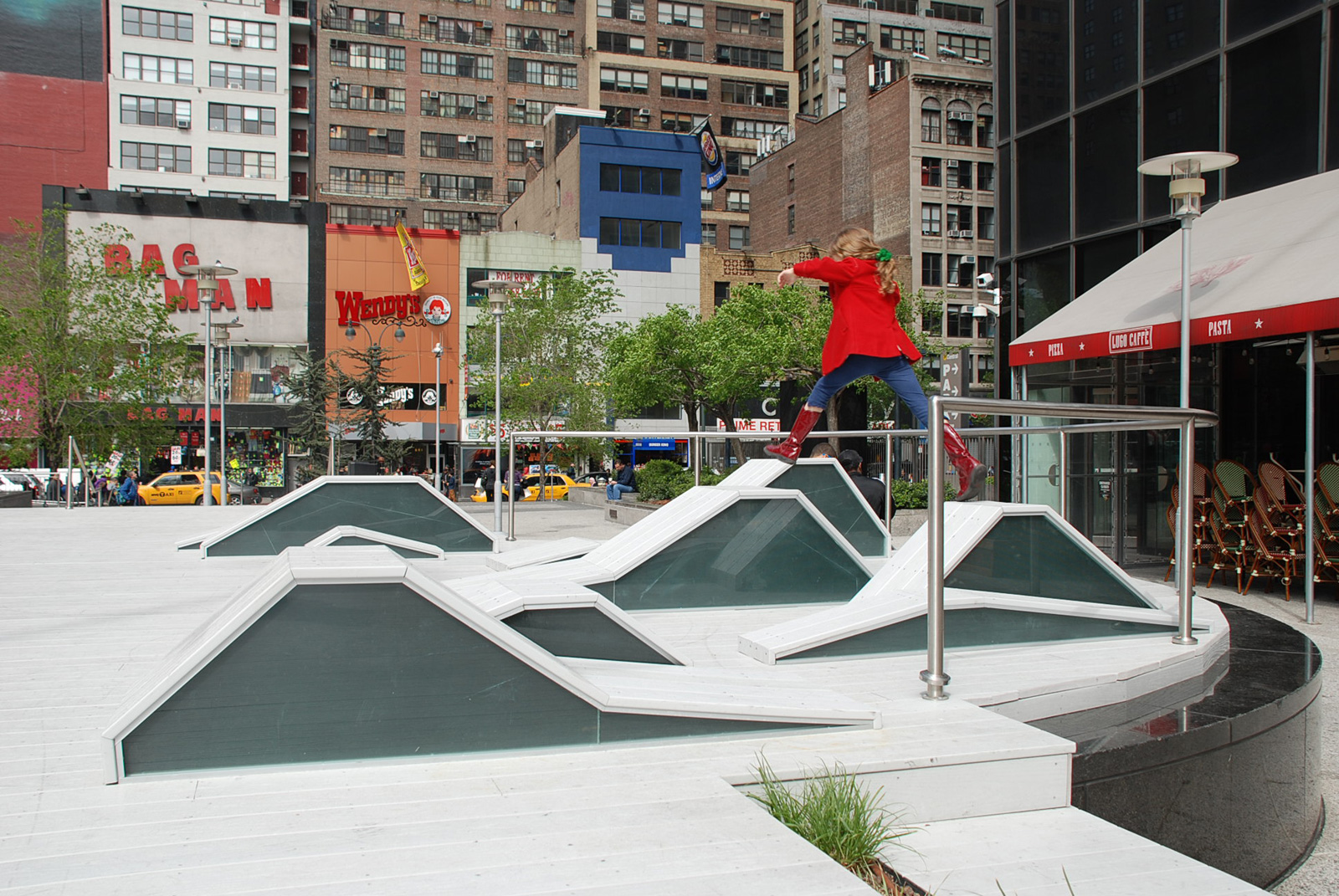
One Penn Plaza in New York City

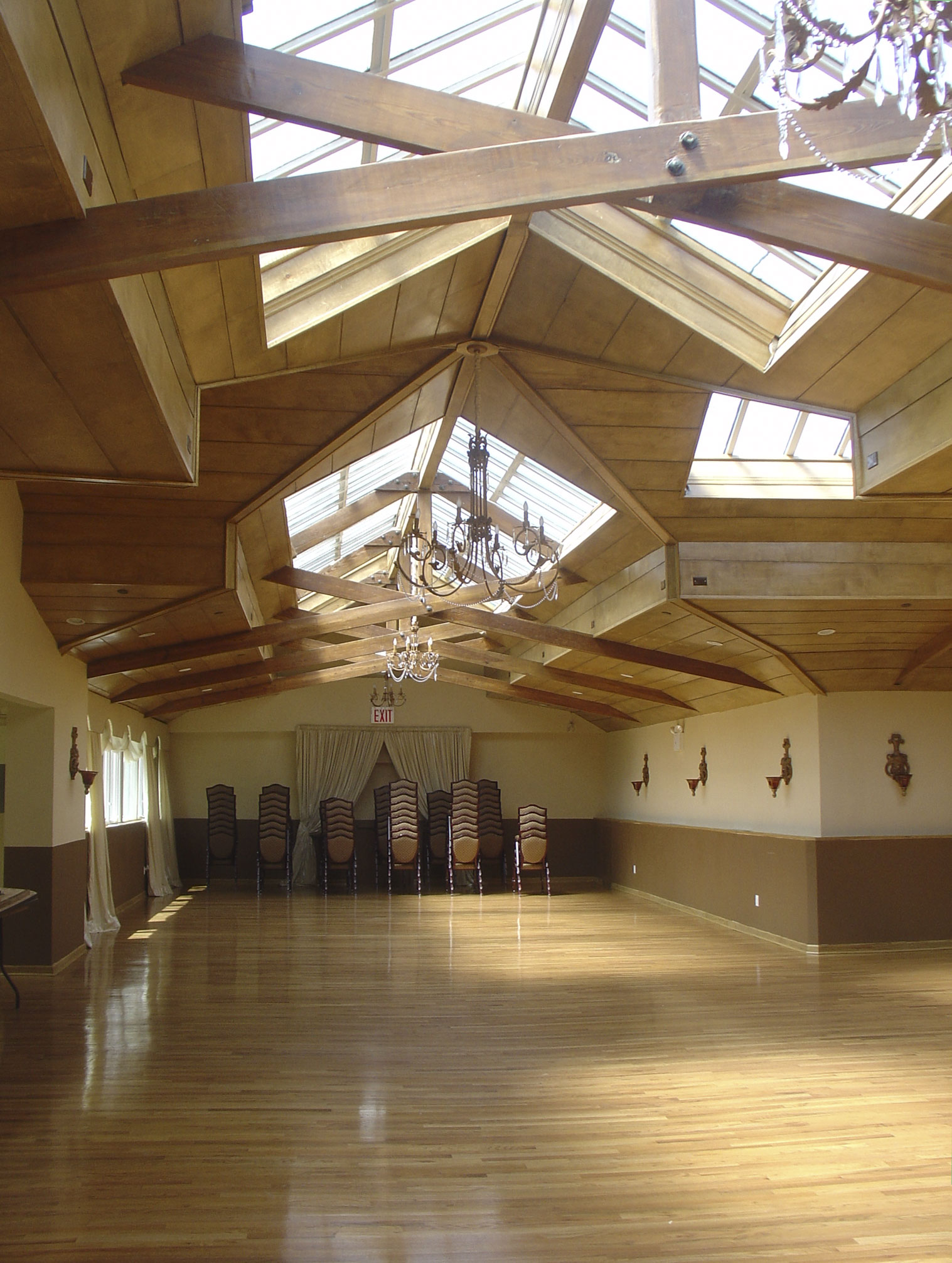
Douglaston Manor in New York City

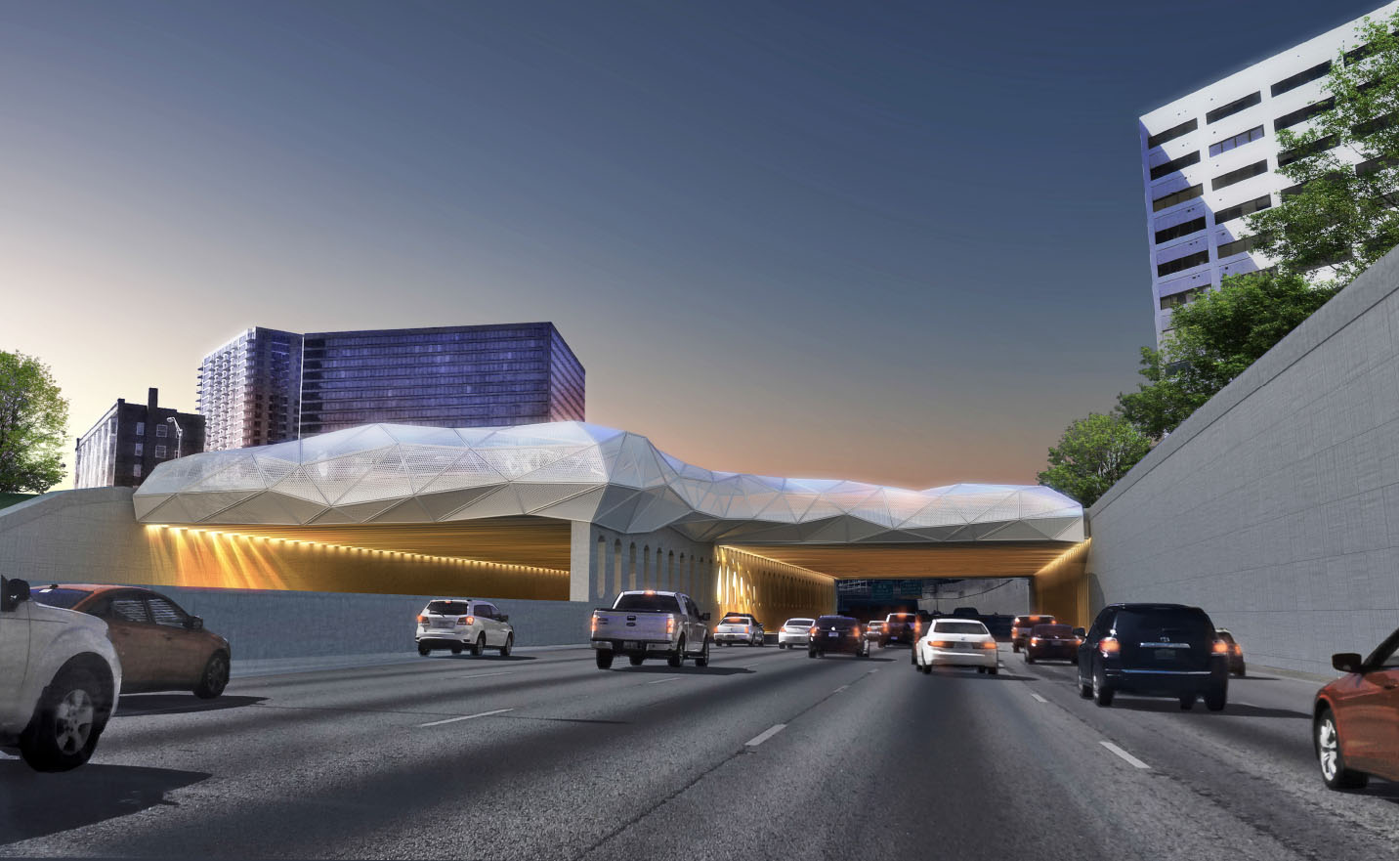
Courtland/McGill Bridge in Atlanta

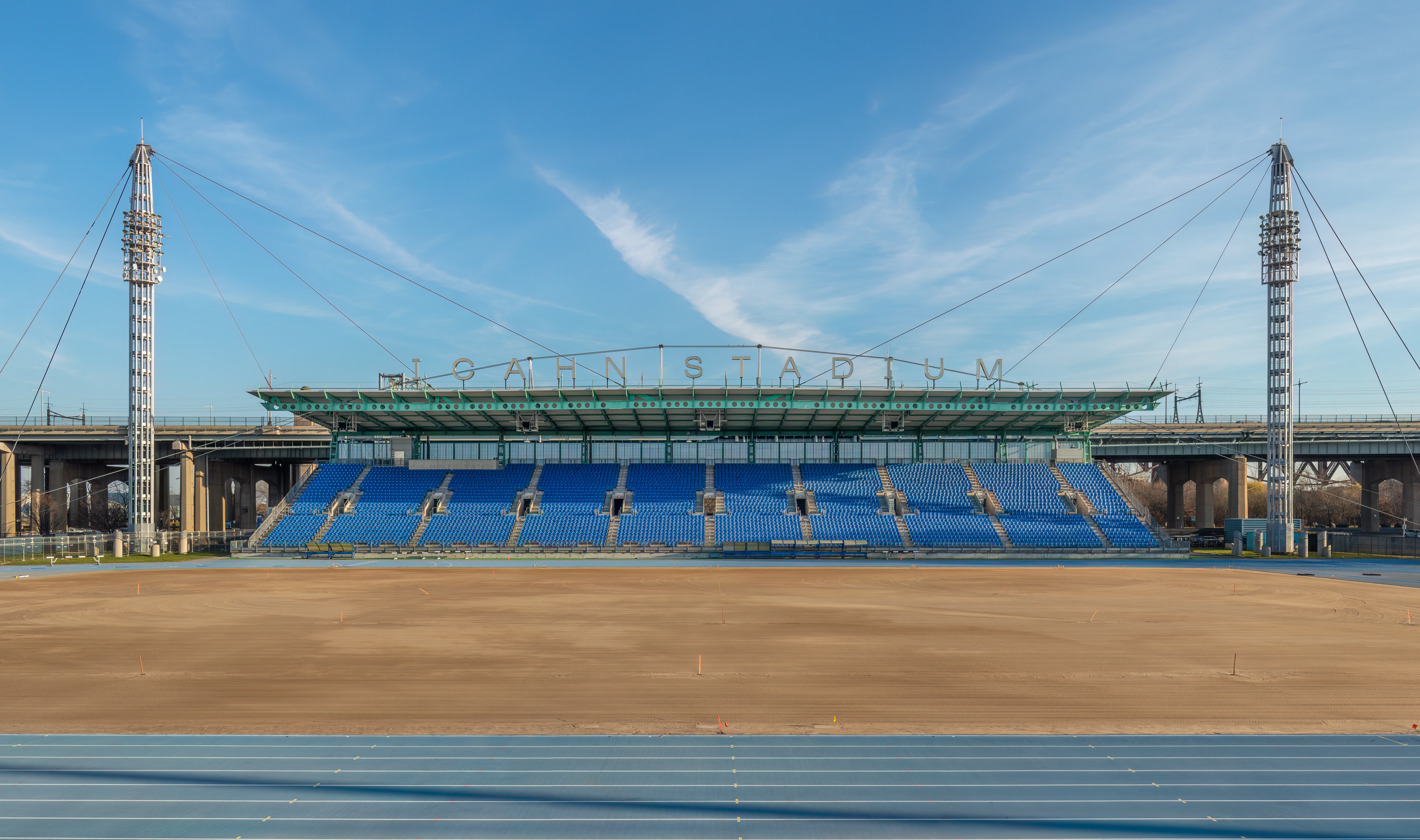
Icahn Stadium on Randall's Island, New York
