= John McEnroe Tennis Academy =

American tennis academy

- Founder: John McEnroe
- Established: 2010
- Address: One Randall's Island, New York, NY 10035
- Location: Randall's Island, New York City, New York
- Coordinates: 40.792820°N 73.919188°W
- Website: johnmcenroetennisacademy.com

The John McEnroe Tennis Academy (JMTA) is a tennis academy founded by tennis Hall of Famer John McEnroe in New York City. The academy was founded in September 2010, on a 20-court (10 deco turf, 10 clay courts) $18 million tennis complex, designed by Ricardo Zurita, on Randalls Island in Manhattan. McEnroe launched the academy in collaboration with Claude Okin, managing partner of Sportime New York.

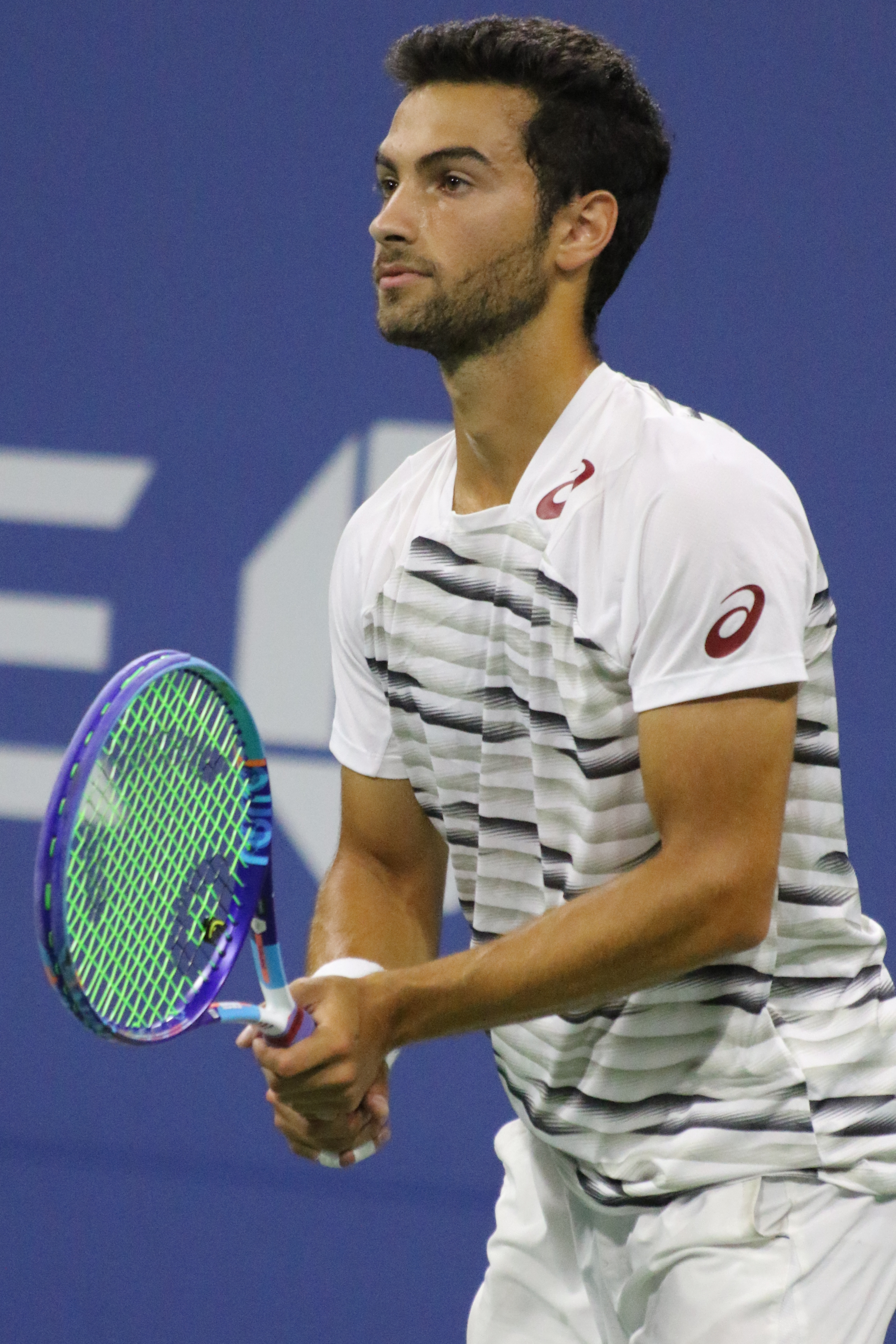
Noah Rubin

McEnroe's teaching philosophy emphasizes short intense periods of tennis training balanced by plenty of time pursuing other sports and activities.

Alumni include Noah Rubin, who won the Boys' Singles tournament at Wimbledon in July 2014, and the 2014 U.S. Tennis Association's Boys 18s National Championships in both singles and doubles the following month, is a product of the academy. In September 2014, Rubin was ranked the No. 1 Division 1 college freshman by the Intercollegiate Tennis Association (ITA) while playing for Wake Forest University, and sophomore Jamie Loeb – another product of the academy – was named the No. 1 Division 1 female college player while playing for University of North Carolina at Chapel Hill.
