= 2018 Stockton Challenger – Women's singles =

Women's singles
- 2018 Stockton Challenger

Final
- Champion: (United States) Madison Brengle
- Runner-up: (United States) Danielle Lao
- Score: 7–5, 7–6^{(12–10)}

Events
Singles	men	women
Doubles	men	women
← 2017 ·	Stockton Challenger	· 2019 →

Sofia Kenin was the defending champion, but chose not to participate.

Madison Brengle won the title, defeating Danielle Lao in an all-American final, 7–5, 7–6^{(12–10)}.

== Seeds ==
1. (United States) Madison Brengle (champion)
2. (United States) Jessica Pegula (semifinals)
3. (Russia) Sofya Zhuk (semifinals)
4. (Czech Republic) Marie Bouzková (second round)
5. (United States) Kristie Ahn (first round)
6. (United States) Jamie Loeb (second round)
7. (Brazil) Beatriz Haddad Maia (first round)
8. (United States) Lauren Davis (second round)

== Draw ==
Key

- Q = Qualifier
- WC = Wild card
- LL = Lucky loser
- Alt = Alternate
- ITF = ITF entry
- PR = Protected ranking
- SR = Special ranking
- SE = Special exempt
- JE = Junior exempt
- JR = Junior Accelerator Programme entrant
- CO = College Accelerator Programme entrant
- NG = Next Gen Accelerator Program entrant
- w/o = Walkover
- r = Retired
- d = Defaulted

=== Finals ===
Semifinals
1	(United States) Madison Brengle	6	6
3	(Russia) Sofya Zhuk	1	1
(United States) Danielle Lao	1	6	6
2	(United States) Jessica Pegula	6	2	2

Final
1	(United States) Madison Brengle	7	7^{12}
(United States) Danielle Lao	5	6^{10}

=== Top half ===
First round
1	(United States) M Brengle	6	7
(Norway) U Eikeri	4	5
LL	(United States) J Elie	3	1
(United States) A Kratzer	6	6
(Serbia) J Jakšić	1^{r}
(United States) A Li	4
WC	(United States) V Duval	6	5	5
8	(United States) L Davis	4	7	7
3	(Russia) S Zhuk	6	7^{9}
(United States) K Day	3	6^{7}
Q	(United States) M Manasse	7^{7}	4	6
(Canada) R Marino	6^{4}	6	0
(Japan) M Osaka	6	6
(United States) M Sanchez	1	3
(United States) R Anderson	6	4	7^{7}
5	(United States) K Ahn	1	6	6^{4}

Second round
1	(United States) M Brengle	6	6
(United States) A Kratzer	3	1
(United States) A Li	6	7
8	(United States) L Davis	2	5
3	(Russia) S Zhuk	6	6
Q	(United States) M Manasse	4	3
(Japan) M Osaka	5	4
(United States) R Anderson	7	6

Quarterfinals
1	(United States) M Brengle	6	6
(United States) A Li	2	1
3	(Russia) S Zhuk	4	6	6
(United States) R Anderson	6	4	4

Semifinals
1	(United States) M Brengle	6	6
3	(Russia) S Zhuk	1	1

=== Bottom half ===
First round
6/WC	(United States) J Loeb	6	6
(United States) E Bektas	4	1
Q	(United States) K Volynets	5	1
JE	(United States) W Osuigwe	7	6
Q	(United States) S Marand	0	6	6^{4}
(United States) D Lao	6	2	7^{7}
WC	(United States) D Willson	1	0
4	(Czech Republic) M Bouzková	6	6
7	(Brazil) B Haddad Maia	6	5	0^{r}
(Bulgaria) S Karatantcheva	4	7	0
(United States) L Chirico	4	1
Q	(Switzerland) A Sadiković	6	6
WC	(United States) H Carter	7^{7}	2	6
(Canada) K Sebov	6^{2}	6	1
(Argentina) N Podoroska	0	0^{r}
2	(United States) J Pegula	6	0

Second round
6/WC	(United States) J Loeb	3	1
JE	(United States) W Osuigwe	6	6
(United States) D Lao	6	6
4	(Czech Republic) M Bouzková	3	3
(Bulgaria) S Karatantcheva	6	6^{1}	2
Q	(Switzerland) A Sadiković	2	7^{7}	6
WC	(United States) H Carter	6^{3}	0
2	(United States) J Pegula	7^{7}	6

Quarterfinals
JE	(United States) W Osuigwe	2	0
(United States) D Lao	6	6
Q	(Switzerland) A Sadiković	4	0
2	(United States) J Pegula	6	6

Semifinals
(United States) D Lao	1	6	6
2	(United States) J Pegula	6	2	2
