= 2018 US Open – Men's singles =

Men's singles
- 2018 US Open

Final
- Champion: (Serbia) Novak Djokovic
- Runner-up: (Argentina) Juan Martín del Potro
- Score: 6–3, 7–6^{(7–4)}, 6–3

Details
- Draw: 128 (16Q / 8WC)
- Seeds: 32

Events
Singles	men	women		boys	girls
Doubles	men	women	mixed	boys	girls
WC Singles	men	women	quad
WC Doubles	men	women	quad
Legends	men	women	mixed
- US Open

Novak Djokovic defeated Juan Martín del Potro in the final, 6–3, 7–6^{(7–4)}, 6–3 to win the men's singles tennis title at the 2018 US Open. It was his third US Open title and 14th major title overall.

Rafael Nadal was the defending champion, but he retired in the semifinals against del Potro in a rematch of the previous year's semifinal. Nadal and Roger Federer were in contention for the world No. 1 singles ranking; Nadal retained the top ranking after Federer lost in the fourth round.

This tournament marked the last major appearance of former world No. 3 David Ferrer; he retired from his first round match against Nadal due to injury. This was also the first major since the 2017 Wimbledon Championships in which former world No. 1 Andy Murray participated, entering with a protected ranking. He lost in the second round to Fernando Verdasco.

This marked the first time in the tournament's history that seven former champions competed: Federer, del Potro (in his final US Open appearance), Nadal, Djokovic, Murray, Marin Čilić and Stan Wawrinka.

Peter Polansky was the first player to qualify for the main draw of all four majors as a lucky loser in a calendar year.

== Seeds ==
All seedings per ATP rankings.

1. (Spain) Rafael Nadal (semifinals, retired)
2. (Switzerland) Roger Federer (fourth round)
3. (Argentina) Juan Martín del Potro (final)
4. (Germany) Alexander Zverev (third round)
5. (South Africa) Kevin Anderson (fourth round)
6. (Serbia) Novak Djokovic (champion)
7. (Croatia) Marin Čilić (quarterfinals)
8. (Bulgaria) Grigor Dimitrov (first round)
9. (Austria) Dominic Thiem (quarterfinals)
10. (Belgium) David Goffin (fourth round)
11. (United States) John Isner (quarterfinals)
12. (Spain) Pablo Carreño Busta (second round, retired)
13. (Argentina) Diego Schwartzman (third round)
14. (Italy) Fabio Fognini (second round)
15. (Greece) Stefanos Tsitsipas (second round)
16. (United Kingdom) Kyle Edmund (first round)

17. (France) Lucas Pouille (third round)
18. (United States) Jack Sock (second round)
19. (Spain) Roberto Bautista Agut (first round)
20. (Croatia) Borna Ćorić (fourth round)
21. (Japan) Kei Nishikori (semifinals)
22. (Italy) Marco Cecchinato (first round)
23. (South Korea) Chung Hyeon (second round)
24. (Bosnia and Herzegovina) Damir Džumhur (first round)
25. (Canada) Milos Raonic (fourth round)
26. (France) Richard Gasquet (third round)
27. (Russia) Karen Khachanov (third round)
28. (Canada) Denis Shapovalov (third round)
29. (France) Adrian Mannarino (first round)
30. (Australia) Nick Kyrgios (third round)
31. (Spain) Fernando Verdasco (third round)
32. (Serbia) Filip Krajinović (first round, retired)

Click on the seed number of a player to go to their draw section.

== Draw ==
Key

- Q = Qualifier
- WC = Wild card
- LL = Lucky loser
- Alt = Alternate
- ITF = ITF entry
- PR = Protected ranking
- SR = Special ranking
- SE = Special exempt
- JE = Junior exempt
- JR = Junior Accelerator Programme entrant
- CO = College Accelerator Programme entrant
- NG = Next Gen Accelerator Program entrant
- w/o = Walkover
- r = Retired
- d = Defaulted

=== Finals ===
Quarterfinals
1	(Spain) Rafael Nadal	0	6	7	6^{4}	7^{7}
9	(Austria) Dominic Thiem	6	4	5	7^{7}	6^{5}
3	(Argentina) Juan Martín del Potro	6^{5}	6	7^{7}	6
11	(United States) John Isner	7^{7}	3	6^{4}	2
7	(Croatia) Marin Čilić	6	4	6^{5}	6	4
21	(Japan) Kei Nishikori	2	6	7^{7}	4	6
6	(Serbia) Novak Djokovic	6	6	6
(Australia) John Millman	3	4	4

Semifinals
1	(Spain) Rafael Nadal	6^{3}	2	0^{r}
3	(Argentina) Juan Martín del Potro	7^{7}	6	0
21	(Japan) Kei Nishikori	3	4	2
6	(Serbia) Novak Djokovic	6	6	6

Final
3	(Argentina) Juan Martín del Potro	3	6^{4}	3
6	(Serbia) Novak Djokovic	6	7^{7}	6

=== Top half ===
==== Section 1 ====
First round
1	(Spain) R Nadal	6	3
(Spain) D Ferrer	3	4^{r}
(Canada) V Pospisil	7	6	6
(Slovakia) L Lacko	5	3	2
(Luxembourg) G Müller	6^{2}	7^{11}	7	6^{6}	2
LL	(Italy) L Sonego	7^{7}	6^{9}	5	7^{8}	6
(Spain) A Ramos Viñolas	3	2	3
27	(Russia) K Khachanov	6	6	6
18	(United States) J Sock	6	7^{7}	6
(Argentina) G Andreozzi	0	6^{4}	2
(Slovenia) A Bedene	2	6	2	6	4
(Georgia (country)) N Basilashvili	6	4	6	2	6
Q	(Norway) C Ruud	4	4	1
(Argentina) G Pella	6	6	6
(Italy) P Lorenzi	4	6	7	6
16	(United Kingdom) K Edmund	6	4	5	1

Second round
1	(Spain) R Nadal	6	6	6
(Canada) V Pospisil	3	4	2
LL	(Italy) L Sonego	5	3	3
27	(Russia) K Khachanov	7	6	6
18	(United States) J Sock	6	3	2	6^{3}
(Georgia (country)) N Basilashvili	4	6	6	7^{7}
(Argentina) G Pella	7	6	6
(Italy) P Lorenzi	5	0	2

Third round
1	(Spain) R Nadal	5	7	7^{9}	7^{7}
27	(Russia) K Khachanov	7	5	6^{7}	6^{3}
(Georgia (country)) N Basilashvili	6	6	1	7^{7}
(Argentina) G Pella	3	4	6	6^{4}

Fourth round
1	(Spain) R Nadal	6	6	6^{6}	6
(Georgia (country)) N Basilashvili	3	3	7^{8}	4

==== Section 2 ====
First round
9	(Austria) D Thiem	6	6	6
(Bosnia and Herzegovina) M Bašić	3	1	4
(Uzbekistan) D Istomin	3	6^{6}	3
(United States) S Johnson	6	7^{8}	6
(Germany) M Zverev	6	6	4	6^{2}	2
(United States) T Fritz	4	2	6	7^{7}	6
WC	(Australia) J Kubler	6	6	6
19	(Spain) R Bautista Agut	3	3	4
28	(Canada) D Shapovalov	7	5	4
Q	(Canada) F Auger-Aliassime	5	7	1^{r}
(United States) S Querrey	7^{8}	4	2	1^{r}
(Italy) A Seppi	6^{6}	6	6	2
(France) J Chardy	6	4	6	6
(Russia) A Rublev	2	6	4	1
(United States) R Harrison	6^{4}	7	6	3	4
5	(South Africa) K Anderson	7^{7}	5	4	6	6

Second round
9	(Austria) D Thiem	6^{5}	6	5	6	6
(United States) S Johnson	7^{7}	3	7	4	1
(United States) T Fritz	6	3	6	0
WC	(Australia) J Kubler	3	6	3	0^{r}
28	(Canada) D Shapovalov	6	4	5	7^{7}	6
(Italy) A Seppi	4	6	7	6^{2}	4
(France) J Chardy	2	4	4
5	(South Africa) K Anderson	6	6	6

Third round
9	(Austria) D Thiem	3	6	7^{7}	6
(United States) T Fritz	6	3	6^{5}	4
28	(Canada) D Shapovalov	6	3	4	6	4
5	(South Africa) K Anderson	4	6	6	4	6

Fourth round
9	(Austria) D Thiem	7	6	7^{7}
5	(South Africa) K Anderson	5	2	6^{2}

==== Section 3 ====
First round
3	(Argentina) JM del Potro	6	6	6
Q	(United States) D Young	0	3	4
(United States) D Kudla	6	7	6
(Italy) M Berrettini	4	5	2
PR	(United Kingdom) A Murray	6^{5}	6	7	6
PR	(Australia) J Duckworth	7^{7}	3	5	3
(Spain) F López	2	5	4
31	(Spain) F Verdasco	6	7	6
20	(Croatia) B Ćorić	6	6	5	6
(Germany) F Mayer	2	2	7	4
(Spain) R Carballés Baena	3	6	6	7^{7}
Q	(United States) M Krueger	6	2	4	6^{3}
(Russia) D Medvedev	7	6	6
(Russia) E Donskoy	5	4	2
Q	(Spain) T Robredo	3	6^{1}	4
15	(Greece) S Tsitsipas	6	7^{7}	6

Second round
3	(Argentina) JM del Potro	6	6	7^{7}
(United States) D Kudla	3	1	6^{4}
PR	(United Kingdom) A Murray	5	6	4	4
31	(Spain) F Verdasco	7	2	6	6
20	(Croatia) B Ćorić	7^{7}	6	6
(Spain) R Carballés Baena	6^{4}	2	3
(Russia) D Medvedev	6	6	4	6
15	(Greece) S Tsitsipas	4	3	6	3

Third round
3	(Argentina) JM del Potro	7	7^{8}	6
31	(Spain) F Verdasco	5	6^{6}	3
20	(Croatia) B Ćorić	6	7	6
(Russia) D Medvedev	3	5	2

Fourth round
3	(Argentina) JM del Potro	6	6	6
20	(Croatia) B Ćorić	4	3	1

==== Section 4 ====
First round
11	(United States) J Isner	7^{7}	6	6
WC	(United States) B Klahn	6^{3}	3	4
(Chile) N Jarry	7^{7}	4	6	7
(Germany) P Gojowczyk	6^{4}	6	1	5
(United Kingdom) C Norrie	7	4	6	6
(Australia) J Thompson	5	6	4	3
(Serbia) D Lajović	3	6	6	6
24	(Bosnia and Herzegovina) D Džumhur	6	1	3	4
25	(Canada) M Raonic	7^{7}	6	1	6
Q	(Argentina) C Berlocq	6^{4}	4	6	3
Q	(South Africa) L Harris	2	2	3
(France) G Simon	6	6	6
Q	(United States) C Altamirano	3	6^{4}	3
Q	(France) U Humbert	6	7^{7}	6
WC	(Switzerland) S Wawrinka	6	6	7
8	(Bulgaria) G Dimitrov	3	2	5

Second round
11	(United States) J Isner	6^{7}	6	3	7^{7}	6
(Chile) N Jarry	7^{9}	4	6	6^{2}	4
(United Kingdom) C Norrie	2	6	4	4
(Serbia) D Lajović	6	2	6	6
25	(Canada) M Raonic	6	6	6
(France) G Simon	3	4	4
Q	(France) U Humbert	6^{5}	6	3	5
WC	(Switzerland) S Wawrinka	7^{7}	4	6	7

Third round
11	(United States) J Isner	7^{10}	6^{6}	6	7
(Serbia) D Lajović	6^{8}	7^{8}	3	5
25	(Canada) M Raonic	7^{8}	6	6
WC	(Switzerland) S Wawrinka	6^{6}	4	3

Fourth round
11	(United States) J Isner	3	6	6	3	6
25	(Canada) M Raonic	6	3	4	6	2

=== Bottom half ===
==== Section 5 ====
First round
7	(Croatia) M Čilić	7	6	1
(Romania) M Copil	5	1	1^{r}
Q	(Italy) S Travaglia	2	6	6^{6}	0^{r}
Q	(Poland) H Hurkacz	6	2	7^{8}	3
(Australia) A de Minaur	6	6	6
(Japan) T Daniel	0	1	2
(United States) F Tiafoe	6	6	4	6
29	(France) A Mannarino	1	4	6	4
22	(Italy) M Cecchinato	6	6^{5}	3	4
(France) J Benneteau	2	7^{7}	6	6
WC	(United States) T Smyczek	6^{2}	4	3
(Germany) J-L Struff	7^{7}	6	6
(United States) M McDonald	6	6	3	1	3
(Netherlands) R Haase	4	4	6	6	6
Q	(Italy) F Gaio	2	4	6^{5}
10	(Belgium) D Goffin	6	6	7^{7}

Second round
7	(Croatia) M Čilić	6	6	6
Q	(Poland) H Hurkacz	2	0	0
(Australia) A de Minaur	6	6	5	6
(United States) F Tiafoe	4	0	7	2
(France) J Benneteau	2	6	1	6	3
(Germany) J-L Struff	6	4	6	3	6
(Netherlands) R Haase	2	7^{7}	3	2
10	(Belgium) D Goffin	6	6^{1}	6	6

Third round
7	(Croatia) M Čilić	4	3	6	6	7
(Australia) A de Minaur	6	6	3	4	5
(Germany) J-L Struff	4	1	6^{4}
10	(Belgium) D Goffin	6	6	7^{7}

Fourth round
7	(Croatia) M Čilić	7^{8}	6	6
10	(Belgium) D Goffin	6^{6}	2	4

==== Section 6 ====
First round
13	(Argentina) D Schwartzman	6	7^{8}	6
(Argentina) F Delbonis	2	6^{6}	2
LL	(Belgium) R Bemelmans	7	3	6^{3}	6	1
(Spain) J Munar	5	6	7^{7}	2	6
Q	(Argentina) F Bagnis	6^{4}	6	0	0
(France) G Monfils	7^{7}	3	6	6
(Germany) M Marterer	2	2	3
21	(Japan) K Nishikori	6	6	6
32	(Serbia) F Krajinović	6^{1}	7^{7}	6	1	1^{r}
(Australia) M Ebden	7^{7}	6^{5}	4	6	4
(Germany) Y Hanfmann	6^{3}	7	4	4
(Germany) P Kohlschreiber	7^{7}	5	6	6
LL	(France) N Mahut	6	7	5	6
WC	(France) C Moutet	2	5	7	4
LL	(Canada) P Polansky	2	1	2
4	(Germany) A Zverev	6	6	6

Second round
13	(Argentina) D Schwartzman	6	6	5	6
(Spain) J Munar	2	0	7	2
(France) G Monfils	2	4^{r}
21	(Japan) K Nishikori	6	5
(Australia) M Ebden	7^{7}	3	2	0
(Germany) P Kohlschreiber	6^{1}	6	6	6
LL	(France) N Mahut	4	4	2
4	(Germany) A Zverev	6	6	6

Third round
13	(Argentina) D Schwartzman	4	4	7	1
21	(Japan) K Nishikori	6	6	5	6
(Germany) P Kohlschreiber	6^{1}	6	6	6
4	(Germany) A Zverev	7^{7}	4	1	3

Fourth round
21	(Japan) K Nishikori	6	6	7
(Germany) P Kohlschreiber	3	2	5

==== Section 7 ====
First round
6	(Serbia) N Djokovic	6	3	6	6
(Hungary) M Fucsovics	3	6	4	0
(Serbia) V Troicki	3	4	2
(United States) T Sandgren	6	6	6
(Serbia) L Đere	6	6	4	2
(Argentina) L Mayer	4	4	6	1^{r}
(Japan) Y Sugita	3	1	3
26	(France) R Gasquet	6	6	6
17	(France) L Pouille	7^{8}	6	7
Q	(Germany) Y Maden	6^{6}	2	5
(Cyprus) M Baghdatis	6	6	2	3
(Russia) M Youzhny	4	4	6	1^{r}
(Portugal) J Sousa	6	6	6
Q	(Spain) M Granollers	2	2	3
(Tunisia) M Jaziri	5	2	2
12	(Spain) P Carreño Busta	7	6	6

Second round
6	(Serbia) N Djokovic	6	6	6^{2}	6
(United States) T Sandgren	1	3	7^{7}	2
(Serbia) L Đere	3	6^{5}	3
26	(France) R Gasquet	6	7^{7}	6
17	(France) L Pouille	6^{4}	6	6	6
(Cyprus) M Baghdatis	7^{7}	4	4	3
(Portugal) J Sousa	4	6	5	6	2
12	(Spain) P Carreño Busta	6	3	7	2	0^{r}

Third round
6	(Serbia) N Djokovic	6	6	6
26	(France) R Gasquet	2	3	3
17	(France) L Pouille	6^{5}	6	6^{4}	6^{5}
(Portugal) J Sousa	7^{7}	4	7^{7}	7^{7}

Fourth round
6	(Serbia) N Djokovic	6	6	6
(Portugal) J Sousa	3	4	3

==== Section 8 ====
First round
14	(Italy) F Fognini	4	6	6	7^{7}
WC	(United States) M Mmoh	6	2	4	6^{4}
WC	(United States) J Brooksby	4	2	0
(Australia) J Millman	6	6	6
(Kazakhstan) M Kukushkin	6	6	4	7^{7}
WC	(United States) N Rubin	3	1	6	6^{3}
(Lithuania) R Berankis	6	6^{6}	0	0^{r}
23	(South Korea) H Chung	4	7^{8}	6	2
30	(Australia) N Kyrgios	7	2	6	6
(Moldova) R Albot	5	6	4	2
(India) Y Bhambri	3	6^{3}	5
(France) P-H Herbert	6	7^{7}	7
(France) B Paire	7^{8}	3	7	7^{7}
Q	(Austria) D Novak	6^{6}	6	5	6^{5}
PR	(Japan) Y Nishioka	2	2	4
2	(Switzerland) R Federer	6	6	6

Second round
14	(Italy) F Fognini	1	6	4	1
(Australia) J Millman	6	4	6	6
(Kazakhstan) M Kukushkin	7^{7}	6	6
23	(South Korea) H Chung	6^{5}	2	3
30	(Australia) N Kyrgios	4	7^{8}	6	6
(France) P-H Herbert	6	6^{6}	3	0
(France) B Paire	5	4	4
2	(Switzerland) R Federer	7	6	6

Third round
(Australia) J Millman	6	4	6	6
(Kazakhstan) M Kukushkin	4	6	1	3
30	(Australia) N Kyrgios	4	1	5
2	(Switzerland) R Federer	6	6	7

Fourth round
(Australia) J Millman	3	7	7^{9}	7^{7}
2	(Switzerland) R Federer	6	5	6^{7}	6^{3}

Preceded by 2018 Wimbledon Championships – Men's singles	Grand Slam men's singles	Succeeded by 2019 Australian Open – Men's singles
