= 2018 Stockton Challenger – Women's doubles =

Women's doubles
- 2018 Stockton Challenger

Final
- Champions: (United States) Hayley Carter (United States) Ena Shibahara
- Runners-up: (United States) Quinn Gleason (Brazil) Luisa Stefani
- Score: 7–5, 5–7, [10–7]

Events
Singles	men	women
Doubles	men	women
← 2017 ·	Stockton Challenger	· 2019 →

Usue Maitane Arconada and Sofia Kenin were the defending champions, but chose not to participate this year.

Hayley Carter and Ena Shibahara won the title, defeating Quinn Gleason and Luisa Stefani in the final, 7–5, 5–7, [10–7].

== Seeds ==
1. (United States) Asia Muhammad / (United States) Maria Sanchez (quarterfinals, withdrew)
2. (Serbia) Jovana Jakšić / (Sweden) Cornelia Lister (quarterfinals)
3. (Indonesia) Beatrice Gumulya / (Montenegro) Ana Veselinović (first round)
4. (United States) Sanaz Marand / (United States) Whitney Osuigwe (quarterfinals)

== Draw ==
Key

- Q = Qualifier
- WC = Wild card
- LL = Lucky loser
- Alt = Alternate
- ITF = ITF entry
- PR = Protected ranking
- SR = Special ranking
- SE = Special exempt
- JE = Junior exempt
- JR = Junior Accelerator Programme entrant
- CO = College Accelerator Programme entrant
- NG = Next Gen Accelerator Program entrant
- w/o = Walkover
- r = Retired
- d = Defaulted

=== Draw ===
First round
1	(United States) A Muhammad (United States) M Sanchez	3	6	[10]
(Canada) S Fichman (United States) J Loeb	6	4	[8]
WC	(Netherlands) R Nederstigt (United States) D Willson	1	1
(United States) Q Gleason (Brazil) L Stefani	6	6
3	(Indonesia) B Gumulya (Montenegro) A Veselinović	2	0
WC	(United States) R Anderson (United States) M Manasse	6	6
(United States) V Duval (Brazil) B Haddad Maia
WC	(United States) L Guillermo (United States) C Harrison	w/o
(United States) K Ahn (United States) E Bektas	6^{2}	3
(United States) H Carter (United States) E Shibahara	7^{7}	6
(United States) M Brengle (United States) A Kratzer	5	3
4	(United States) S Marand (United States) W Osuigwe	7	6
(United States) J Elie (Indonesia) J Rompies	5	3
(Norway) U Eikeri (Brazil) PC Gonçalves	7	6
(United States) L Chirico (United States) L Davis	5	3
2	(Serbia) J Jakšić (Sweden) C Lister	7	6

Quarterfinals
1	(United States) A Muhammad (United States) M Sanchez
(United States) Q Gleason (Brazil) L Stefani	w/o
WC	(United States) R Anderson (United States) M Manasse	6	7^{7}
WC	(United States) L Guillermo (United States) C Harrison	1	6^{2}
(United States) H Carter (United States) E Shibahara	6	6
4	(United States) S Marand (United States) W Osuigwe	3	4
(Norway) U Eikeri (Brazil) PC Gonçalves	6	6
2	(Serbia) J Jakšić (Sweden) C Lister	4	4

Semifinals
(United States) Q Gleason (Brazil) L Stefani	6	6
WC	(United States) R Anderson (United States) M Manasse	4	1
(United States) H Carter (United States) E Shibahara	6	6
(Norway) U Eikeri (Brazil) PC Gonçalves	0	3

Final
(United States) Q Gleason (Brazil) L Stefani	5	7	[7]
(United States) H Carter (United States) E Shibahara	7	5	[10]
