= Sportime Randall's Island Tennis Center =

Tennis facility in Randalls Island, New York

Coordinates: 40.79290°N 73.91925°W

- Interactive map of Sportime Randall's Island Tennis Center
- Location: 1 Randalls Island, New York, NY 10035
- Operator: Sportime Randall's Island Tennis Center
- Surface: Hard and Clay Courts

Tenant
- New York Sportimes

The Sportime Randall's Island Tennis Center is a tennis facility located in Randalls Island Park in New York City. It is the home of the New York Sportimes team of World TeamTennis (WTT).
