= Enrique Zurita =

Chilean judge

Designated Senator
- In office 11 March 1998 – 11 March 2006
- Succeeded by: Office finished

Minister of the Supreme Court of Chile
- In office 21 January 1985 – 11 March 1998

Personal details
- Born: 8 December 1915 Santiago, Chile
- Died: 21 July 2007 (aged 91) Santiago, Chile
- Spouse: Agustina Goyenechea Sáenz
- Parent(s): José Zurita; Juana Camps
- Education: University of Chile (LL.B)
- Occupation: Lawyer

Enrique Zurita Camps (born 8 December 1915 – 21 July 2007) was a Chilean lawyer who served as Senator and minister of the Supreme Court of Chile.

On 15 December 1997, the Plenary of the Supreme Court appointed Zurita as an institutional senator, serving from 1998 to 2006. Zurita died in Santiago on 21 June 2007.

== Early life and education ==
Zurita was born in Santiago on 8 December 1915, the son of José Zurita Munné and Juana Camps González. He married Agustina Goyenechea Sáenz in Santiago on 18 April 1946. He was widowed in 1990.

He completed his secondary education at the Colegio Hispano Americano. At the age of 14, while attending his fourth year of humanities studies, he began working in various factories for six years, completing his secondary education at the President Balmaceda Night High School, from which he graduated in 1936.

He entered the Faculty of Law at the University of Chile and earned his bachelor's degree in 1937. He qualified as a lawyer on 24 May 1944. His thesis was titled Biological investigation of paternity.

== Professional career ==
Zurita practiced law between 1944 and 1962, primarily in civil law. He also served for nearly 22 years as a professor of Criminal Law at the Carabineros of Chile School, from 1975 to 1997.

In 1956, he traveled to Paris to attend a Lawyers' Congress, also visiting Portugal, Spain, Italy, and England during that trip. Zurita entered the judicial career on 4 June 1963 as a clerk (relator) of the Santiago Court of Appeals.

On 9 December 1969, he was appointed clerk of the Supreme Court of Justice. From 16 December 1974, he served as a Justice of the Santiago Court of Appeals, and on 21 January 1985 he was appointed Justice of the Supreme Court of Chile.

During his tenure on the Supreme Court, he faced two constitutional accusations. The first, in 1996, was filed by deputies of the Concertación coalition for alleged dereliction of duty in the Soria Case, related to the murder of Spanish diplomat Carmelo Soria. The second, in 1997, was presented by members of the Socialist Party and the Party for Democracy concerning a 1991 ruling granting provisional release to Colombian drug trafficker Luis Correa Ramírez. Both accusations were rejected by a large majority in the Chamber of Deputies.

He served as a member and president of the Electoral Qualification Court during the periods 1964–1969 and 1987–1991.

On 15 March 1989, effective retroactively from 9 March, he was appointed member and president of the Advisory Commission of the Ministry of Justice on judicial legislation. He also served as president of the Antitrust Resolution Commission between 1989 and 1997.
