= 2017 Stockton ATP Challenger =

- Date: 2 October – 8 October
- Edition: 2nd
- Surface: Hard
- Location: Stockton, California, United States

Champions

Singles
- (United Kingdom) Cameron Norrie

Doubles
- (United Kingdom) Brydan Klein / (United Kingdom) Joe Salisbury
- Stockton ATP Challenger

The 2017 Stockton ATP Challenger was a professional tennis tournament played on hard courts. It was the second edition of the tournament which was part of the 2017 ATP Challenger Tour. It took place in Stockton, California, United States between 2 October and 8 October 2017.

== Singles main-draw entrants ==
=== Seeds ===
Country	Player	Rank^{1}	Seed
BEL	Ruben Bemelmans	92	1
USA	Tennys Sandgren	104	2
USA	Michael Mmoh	141	3
USA	Stefan Kozlov	144	4
IND	Ramkumar Ramanathan	150	5
BAR	Darian King	158	6
CAN	Félix Auger-Aliassime	162	7
GBR	Cameron Norrie	165	8

- ^{1} Rankings are as of September 25, 2017.

=== Other entrants ===
The following players received wildcards into the singles main draw:

- (United States) Deiton Baughman
- (Egypt) Akram El Sallaly
- (Sweden) André Göransson
- (United States) Denis Kudla

The following players received entry into the singles main draw using protected rankings:

- (Canada) Frank Dancevic
- (United Kingdom) Alexander Ward

The following player received entry into the singles main draw as an alternate:

- (United States) Stefan Kozlov

The following players received entry from the qualifying draw:

- (United States) Sekou Bangoura
- (Germany) Jan Choinski
- (Denmark) Frederik Nielsen
- (Russia) Dmitry Tursunov

== Champions ==
=== Singles ===
- (United Kingdom) Cameron Norrie def. (Barbados) Darian King 6–1, 6–3.

=== Doubles ===
- (United Kingdom) Brydan Klein / (United Kingdom) Joe Salisbury def. (United States) Denis Kudla / (Latvia) Miķelis Lībietis 6–2, 6–4.
