= Noah Rubin (tennis) =

American tennis player (born 1996)

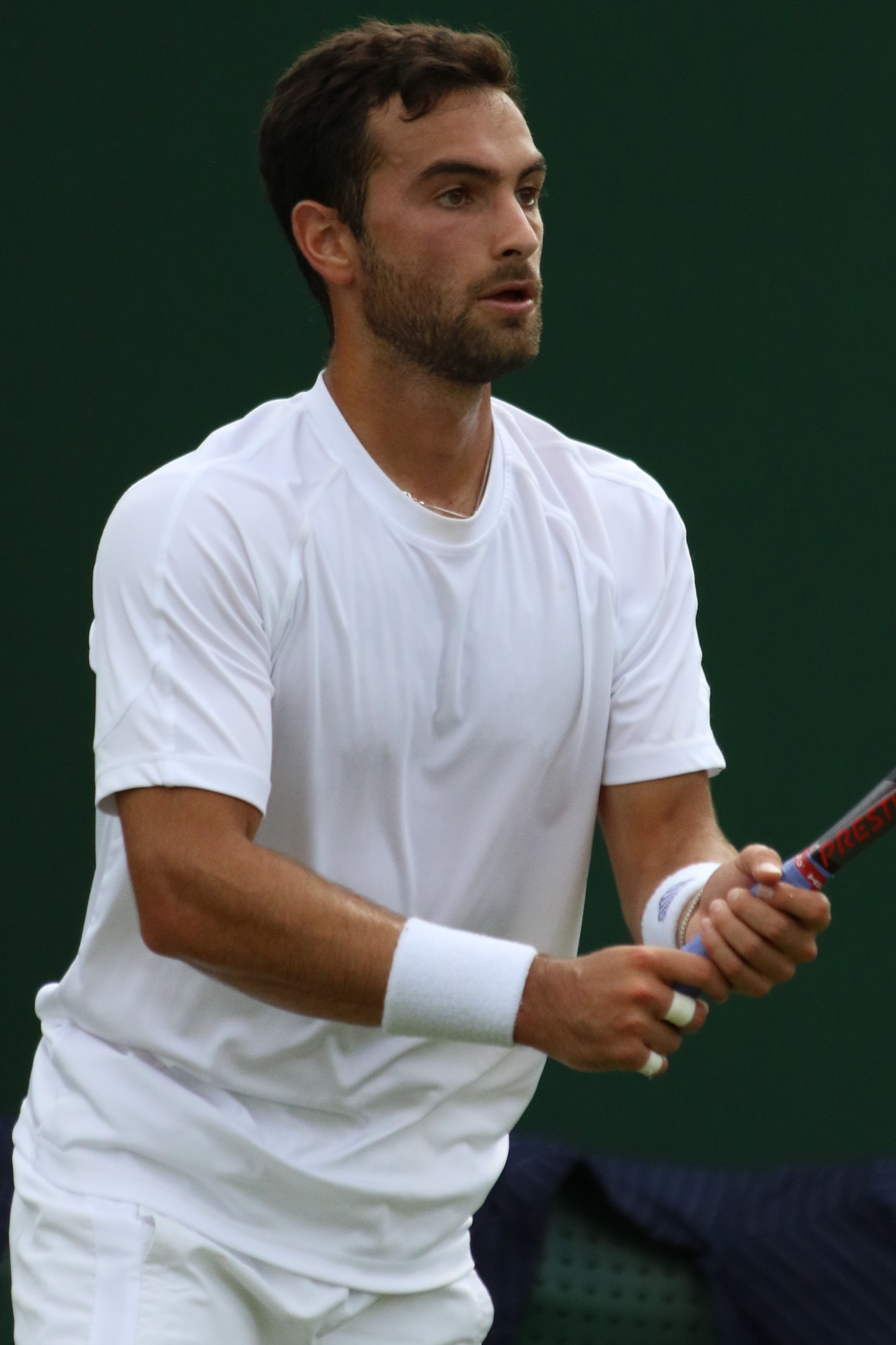
- Rubin at the 2019 Wimbledon Championships
- Country (sports): United States
- Residence: Long Island, New York, US
- Born: February 21, 1996 (age 30) Merrick, New York, US
- Height: 5 ft 9 in (1.75 m)
- Turned pro: 2015
- Plays: Right-handed (two-handed backhand)
- College: Wake Forest University
- Prize money: $754,745

Singles
- Career record: 8–21
- Career titles: 0
- Highest ranking: No. 125 (October 8, 2018)

Grand Slam singles results
- Australian Open: 2R (2016, 2017)
- French Open: 1R (2018)
- Wimbledon: 1R (2019)
- US Open: 1R (2014, 2018)

Doubles
- Career record: 0–4
- Career titles: 0
- Highest ranking: No. 245 (July 29, 2019)

Grand Slam doubles results
- US Open: 1R (2014, 2016, 2019, 2020)

Grand Slam mixed doubles results
- US Open: 1R (2016, 2018)
- Last updated on: September 22, 2020.

Noah Rubin (born February 21, 1996) is an American former professional tennis player. He was the Wimbledon junior singles champion in 2014, and a former USTA junior national champion in both singles and doubles. After turning pro in 2015, he won four ATP Challenger titles.

Rubin also played college tennis for the Wake Forest Demon Deacons in the 2014–15 season. Entering the year as the ITA No. 1 ranked college freshman, he finished the season as an All-American and the runner-up in the 2015 NCAA singles championship.

Despite only peaking at No. 125 in the world, Rubin became a notable player on the tour for his efforts to advocate for mental health awareness on the ATP Tour and greater pay for lower-ranked professional players.

In October 2022, Rubin announced he would retire from tennis and pursue a career as a professional pickleball player. Following limited success on the pickleball tour, he returned to professional tennis in January 2024.

== Early life and education ==
Rubin is Jewish, and his bar mitzvah had a tennis theme. He attended the Merrick Jewish Center religious school, and collected donated tennis rackets for the Israel Tennis Centers as his mitzvah project. He has said, "I want people to know I'm Jewish and I like to represent the Jewish people."

His father Eric Rubin works as a banker, and his mother Melanie is an educator. His father was the top player on the tennis team at Martin Van Buren High School in Queens. As a junior, Noah was coached by his father and Lawrence Kleger. His older sister Jessie was captain of the Binghamton University tennis team.

He has lived in Rockville Centre and Merrick, New York. He attended Levy-Lakeside Elementary School and Merrick Avenue Middle School, and then went to John F. Kennedy High School in Bellmore, Long Island for one year, after which he studied via an online program at the Laurel Springs School, graduating in 2014.

== Junior career ==
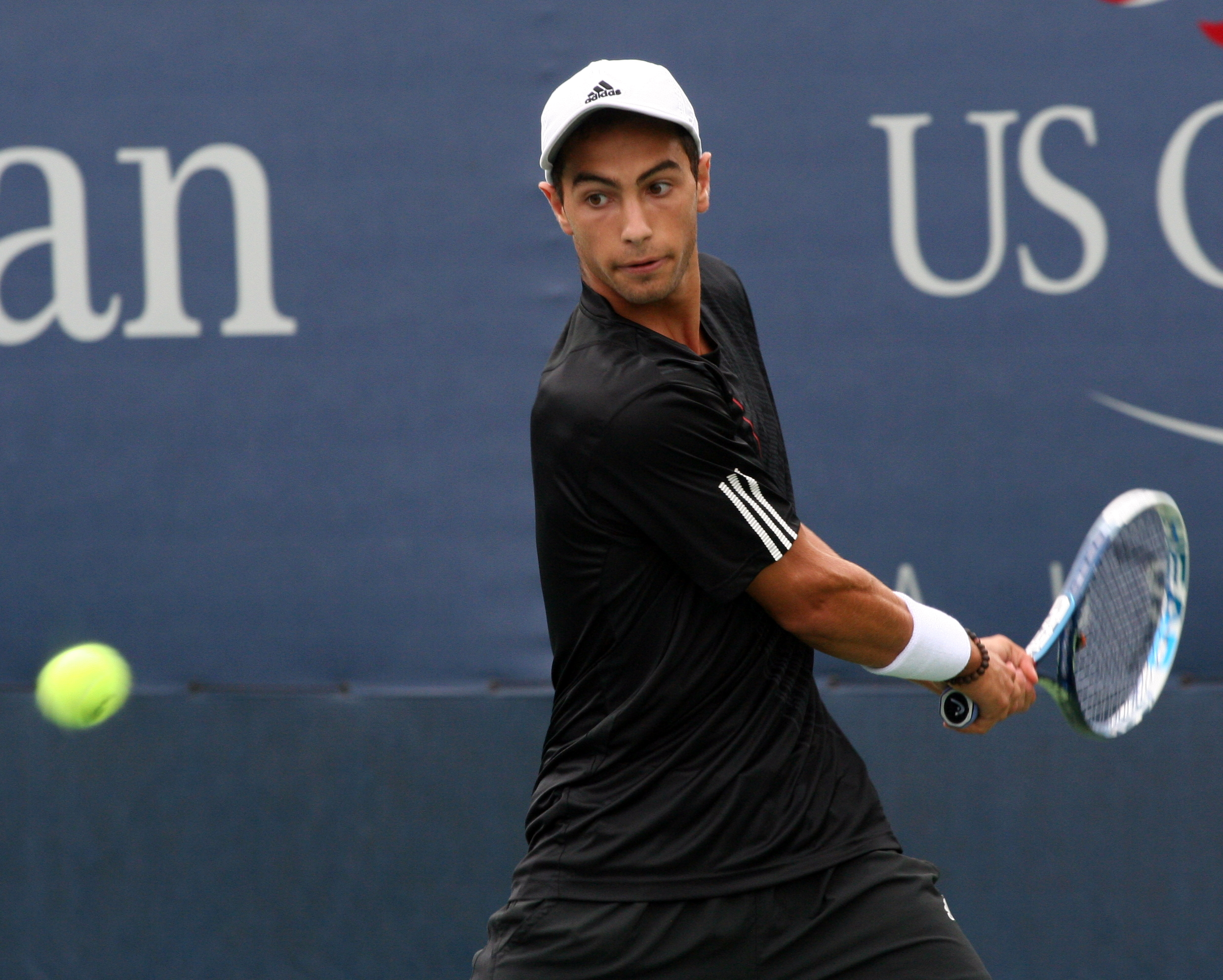
Rubin in 2013.

Rubin played for the John McEnroe Tennis Academy on Randalls Island in Manhattan. By the age of seven, Rubin was competing in 12-and-under events, and he was winning international competitions by the time he was eleven. In 2010, he made it to the finals at Les Petits As in Tarbes, France. In 2011, when Rubin was 15, John McEnroe called him "the most talented player we've come across." He also won the Copa Del Café, a Junior ITF tournament in Costa Rica, in 2012.

As a junior, Rubin reached as high as no. 6 in the International Tennis Federation's world junior ranking and no. 1 in the United States in 2014.

He qualified for the boys' singles tournament at Wimbledon in July 2014, and won the tournament in the first all-American final there since 1977. He was the first American boy to win Wimbledon since Donald Young in 2007. He had played only one other event in 2014 before Wimbledon at the French Open, where he lost in the second round.

The month after hoisting the trophy at Wimbledon, Rubin played in and won the 2014 U.S. Tennis Association's Boys 18s National Championships in both singles and doubles (with close friend Stefan Kozlov). The latter success came with two big bonuses of main-draw wild cards into the singles and doubles events at the US Open.

== College career ==
Rubin attended and played tennis for Wake Forest University in North Carolina, where part of his schedule was to play pro events. His scholarship there allowed him to leave the university after one year and return at any time to complete his degree. In September 2014, Rubin was ranked the No. 1 Division 1 college freshman by the Intercollegiate Tennis Association (ITA).

Rubin ended his 2014–15 freshman season with a 26–4 record, mostly playing no. 1 singles, and ranked no. 5 in the U.S. He was the first player in Atlantic Coast Conference history to be named both men's tennis ACC Player and Freshman of the Year in his freshman season, and was the first Wake Forest ACC men's tennis Player of the Year, and the third to win Freshman of the Year. He was an All-American, ITA Rookie of the Year, four-time ACC Player of the Week, and ITA Carolina Region Rookie of the Year. Playing doubles mostly with Jon Ho at No. 2 doubles, he had a 15–6 record. He lost in the finals of the 2015 NCAA singles championship to Ryan Shane.

== Professional career ==
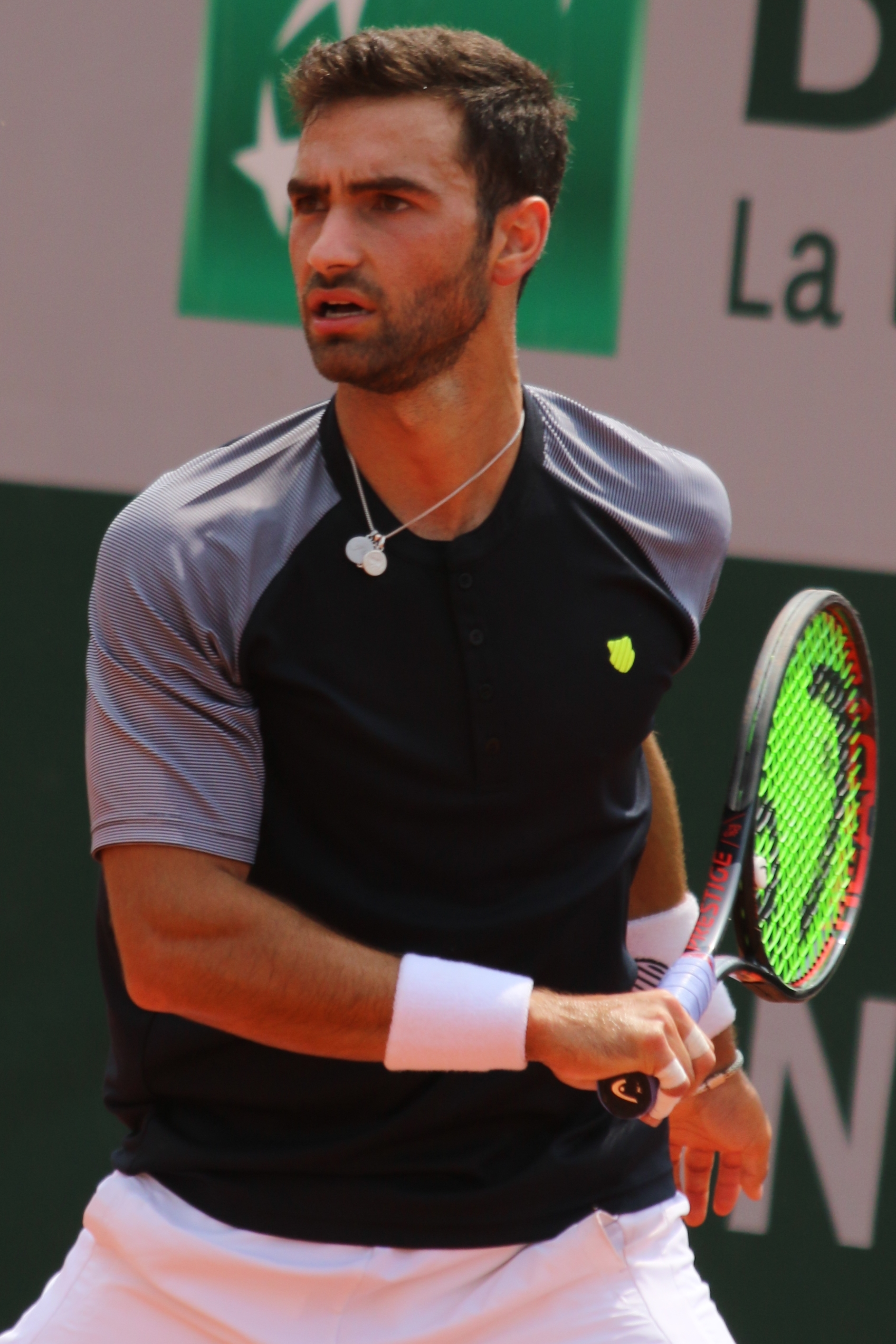
Rubin in 2019.

=== 2015–2016 ===
Rubin turned pro in June 2015 at the age of 19. He made his first final on the ATP Challenger Tour at Charlottesville, and won by defeating fellow American teenager Tommy Paul, despite being down 5–1 in the second set with Paul serving for the match. As the only American to win an event in the Australian Open Wild Card Challenge, Rubin was awarded a wild card into the main draw at the Australian Open. With his wild card, Rubin entered his second career Grand Slam event as the lowest-ranked non-PR player (328th overall) in the main draw of the 2016 Australian Open, where he beat the 17th-seeded Benoit Paire in three tiebreaks in the first round.

Rubin cracked the Top 200 for the first time by qualifying for the 2016 Indian Wells Masters tournament. In the clay court season, he recorded an upset win over 59th-ranked Denis Kudla, the No. 1 seed at the Sarasota Open. Having missed most of the summer tournaments due to a rolled ankle injury he suffered while jogging in June that cost him five months of training and competition, Rubin returned to form in October, reaching his second career Challenger final at Stockton.

=== 2017–2018 ===
Rubin started the 2017 season by winning his first round match at the Australian Open, before falling to eventual champion Roger Federer in the second round. He then went back to Australia and won his second Challenger title at Launceston, Tasmania, in an all-American final against Mitchell Krueger. For the second consecutive year, Rubin missed a few consecutive months of the late spring and early summer due to injury; this one a severely sprained right wrist that he suffered in April when he slipped on a clay court during a tournament in Houston that resulted in him losing 10 months of serious competition and training. He bounced back near the end of the season to finish the year on the cusp of the Top 200, just as in 2016.

Once again, Rubin began the 2018 season by playing at the BNP Paribas de Nouvelle-Calédonie. At this tournament, he greatly improved on his second-round result from the previous year and reached his fourth Challenger final, all four of which have been against other Americans. In the final, Rubin defeated Taylor Fritz to claim his third Challenger title to boost himself to a new career-high ranking of No. 162 in the world. After falling out of the Top 200, Rubin won a fourth Challenger title at the Tallahassee Tennis Challenger. This was his first title on clay and put him back in the Top 200 of the ATP rankings. The title also helped him clinch the French Open Wild Card Challenge to earn a wild card into the main draw of the French Open. In his debut at the tournament, he was beaten by compatriot John Isner.

=== 2019–2022 ===
Rubin played in the main draw of the 2021 Winston-Salem Open as a lucky loser. He lost 6–2, 6–0 to former world No. 1 Andy Murray. Rubin defeated top seed Ernesto Escobedo in the first round of qualifying at the 2022 Hall of Fame Open, but lost in the final round of qualifying to William Blumberg. His last career professional match was in the 2022 Citi Open where he lost 6–2, 6–0 to Taro Daniel in the first round of qualifying.

On September 19, 2022, Rubin, in an Instagram post announced he would be taking an indefinite break from professional tennis. Rubin stated that he was unhappy with his current level of play and sustained a wrist injury that may have required surgery if he wanted to continue playing at a professional level. In the post, Rubin did not rule out returning to professional tennis, but he stated he will be involved with a number of endeavors including "documentaries, clothing lines [and] clubs." In October 2022, Rubin announced he would become a professional pickleball player.

== Personal life ==
Rubin's hobbies are photography, soccer, and art. Rubin has an Instagram account that has met with “modest success,” Behind the Racquet, where players share personal struggles of living on the professional tour. Rubin has found the process to be therapeutic for dealing with the realities of “often lonely, physically taxing life” of professional tennis. He said,

the “goals of the online series – to break the stigma of mental health, to allow players to share their stories and to let fans relate to players on a deeper basis.”

The platform has been used by tennis players including Coco Gauff, Bianca Andreescu, and Katie Swan, to discuss their mental health, monetary concerns, and other issues.

== Challenger and Futures finals ==
=== Singles: 12 (4–8) ===
Legend (singles) ATP Challenger Tour (4–2) ITF Futures Tour (0–6)	Titles by surface Hard (3–5) Clay (1–3) Grass (0–0)

Result	W–L	Date	Tournament	Tier	Surface	Opponent	Score
Loss	0–1	Jul 2013	USA F20, Godfrey	Futures	Hard	(United States) Michael Shabaz	3–6, 5–7
Loss	0–2	Mar 2014	France F6, Poitiers	Futures	Hard (i)	(France) David Guez	3–6, 5–7
Loss	0–3	May 2014	Spain F10, Vic	Futures	Clay	(Belgium) Yannik Reuter	6–3, 4–6, 2–6
Loss	0–4	Jun 2015	USA F19, Tulsa	Futures	Hard	(Barbados) Darian King	6–2, 5–7, 0–6
Win	1–4	Nov 2015	Charlottesville, United States	Challenger	Hard (i)	(United States) Tommy Paul	3–6, 7–6^{(9–7)}, 6–3
Loss	1–5	Feb 2016	USA F8, Plantation	Futures	Clay	(Argentina) Andrea Collarini	3–6, 6–7^{(3–7)}
Loss	1–6	Oct 2016	Stockton, United States	Challenger	Hard	(United States) Frances Tiafoe	4–6, 2–6
Win	2–6	Feb 2017	Launceston, Australia	Challenger	Hard	(United States) Mitchell Krueger	6–0, 6–1
Win	3–6	Jan 2018	Nouméa, New Caledonia	Challenger	Hard	(United States) Taylor Fritz	7–5, 6–4
Loss	3–7	Apr 2018	USA F11, Orange Park	Futures	Clay	(Chile) Marcelo Barrios Vera	3–6, 4–6
Win	4–7	Apr 2018	Tallahassee, United States	Challenger	Clay	(Australia) Marc Polmans	6–2, 3–6, 6–4
Loss	4–8	Jan 2019	Nouméa, New Caledonia	Challenger	Hard	(Sweden) Mikael Ymer	3–6, 3–6

=== Doubles: 3 (1–2) ===
Legend (doubles) ATP Challenger Tour (1–1) ITF Futures Tour (0–1)	Titles by surface Hard (1–0) Clay (0–2) Grass (0–0)

Result	W–L	Date	Tournament	Tier	Surface	Partner	Opponents	Score
Loss	0–1	May 2014	Spain F10, Vic	Futures	Clay	(United States) Stefan Kozlov	(Spain) Sergio Martos Gornés (Spain) Pol Toledo Bagué	2–6, 5–7
Win	1–1	Oct 2018	Stockton, United States	Challenger	Hard	(Barbados) Darian King	(Thailand) Sanchai Ratiwatana (Indonesia) Christopher Rungkat	6–3, 6–4
Loss	1–2	Apr 2019	Tallahassee, United States	Challenger	Clay	(United States) Thai-Son Kwiatkowski	(Venezuela) Roberto Maytín (Brazil) Fernando Romboli	2–6, 6–4, [7–10]

== Junior Grand Slam finals ==
=== Boys' singles ===
Result	Year	Championship	Surface	Opponent	Score
Win	2014	Wimbledon	Grass	(United States) Stefan Kozlov	6–4, 4–6, 6–3

== Singles performance timeline ==
Key
W	F	SF	QF	#R	RR	Q#	DNQ	A	NH

(W) winner; (F) finalist; (SF) semifinalist; (QF) quarterfinalist; (#R) rounds 4, 3, 2, 1; (RR) round-robin stage; (Q#) qualification round; (DNQ) did not qualify; (A) absent; (NH) not held; (SR) strike rate (events won / competed); (W–L) win–loss record.
To avoid confusion and double counting, these charts are updated at the conclusion of a tournament or when the player's participation has ended.

Tournament	2013	2014	2015	2016	2017	2018	2019	2020	2021	2022	SR	W–L
Grand Slam tournaments
Australian Open	A	A	A	2R	2R	Q1	Q2	Q1	A	A	0 / 2	2–2
French Open	A	A	A	Q1	A	1R	Q1	Q1	A	A	0 / 1	0–1
Wimbledon	A	A	A	A	A	Q1	1R	NH	A	A	0 / 1	0–1
US Open	Q1	1R	Q2	Q3	Q1	1R	Q2	A	A	A	0 / 2	0–2
Win–loss	0–0	0–1	0–0	1–1	1–1	0–2	0–1	0–0	0–0	0–0	0 / 6	2–6
ATP Tour Masters 1000
Indian Wells Masters	A	A	A	1R	Q1	Q1	Q2	NH	A	A	0 / 1	0–1
Miami Open	A	A	A	Q2	A	A	Q2	NH	A	A	0 / 0	0–0
Win–loss	0–0	0–0	0–0	0–1	0–0	0–0	0–0	0–0	0–0	0–0	0 / 1	0–1
Career statistics
Tournaments	0	2	1	4	2	6	3	1	2	0	21	
Overall win–loss	0–0	0–2	0–1	2–4	1–2	4–6	0–3	1–1	0–2	0–0	0 / 21	8–21
Year-end ranking	767	604	336	200	201	135	210	250	390	568	28%	

== Record against other players ==
=== Record against top 10 players ===
Rubin's match record against those who have been ranked in the top 10. Players who have been No. 1 are in boldface.

- (Cyprus) Marcos Baghdatis 1–0
- (Russia) Mikhail Youzhny 1–0
- (United States) John Isner 1–1
- (Spain) Nicolás Almagro 0–1
- (Switzerland) **Roger Federer** 0–1
- (Italy) Fabio Fognini 0–1
- (United Kingdom) **Andy Murray** 0–1
- (Japan) Kei Nishikori 0–1
- (Russia) Andrey Rublev 0–1

* As of 16 September 2023.

=== Wins over top 10 players ===
#	Player	Rank	Event	Surface	Rd	Score	NRR
2018
1.	(United States) John Isner	9	Citi Open, United States	Hard	2R	6–4, 7–6^{(8–6)}	152

== See also ==
- List of select Jewish tennis players
