= 2023 Mercer Tennis Classic =

Tennis tournament

- Date: 16–22 October 2023
- Edition: 11th
- Category: ITF Women's World Tennis Tour
- Prize money: $80,000
- Surface: Hard / Outdoor
- Location: Macon, Georgia, United States

Champions

Singles
- (United States) Taylor Townsend

Doubles
- Jana Kolodynska / Tatiana Prozorova
| ← 2022 · | Tennis Classic of Macon | · 2024 → |

The 2023 Mercer Tennis Classic was a professional tennis tournament played on outdoor hard courts. It was the eleventh edition of the tournament which was part of the 2023 ITF Women's World Tennis Tour. It took place in Macon, Georgia, United States between 16 and 22 October 2023.

== Champions ==
=== Singles ===
- (United States) Taylor Townsend def. (Hungary) Panna Udvardy, 6–3, 6–4.

=== Doubles ===
- Jana Kolodynska / Tatiana Prozorova def. (United States) Sofia Sewing / Anastasia Tikhonova, 6–3, 6–2.

== Singles main draw entrants ==
=== Seeds ===
| Country | Player | Rank^{1} | Seed |
|---|---|---|---|
| USA | Taylor Townsend | 77 | 1 |
| USA | Kayla Day | 86 | 2 |
| USA | Katie Volynets | 108 | 3 |
| HUN | Panna Udvardy | 124 | 4 |
| USA | Hailey Baptiste | 136 | 5 |
| USA | Ann Li | 157 | 6 |
| ARG | Julia Riera | 158 | 7 |
| MEX | Renata Zarazúa | 160 | 8 |

- ^{1} Rankings are as of 9 October 2023.

=== Other entrants ===
The following players received wildcards into the singles main draw:

- (United States) Catherine Harrison
- (United States) Alexa Noel

The following players received entry from the qualifying draw:

- (United States) Victoria Hu
- (United States) Ashley Lahey
- (Romania) Gabriela Lee
- (United States) Rasheeda McAdoo
- (United States) Victoria Osuigwe
- (United States) Alana Smith
- (United States) Akasha Urhobo
- (Germany) Alexandra Vecic

The following player received entry as a lucky loser:

- (United States) Anna Rogers
