= 2025 Mercer Tennis Classic – Singles =

Singles
- 2025 Mercer Tennis Classic

Final
- Champion: (Mexico) Renata Zarazúa
- Runner-up: (United States) Anna Rogers
- Score: 6–2, 6–1

Events
Singles	Doubles
← 2024 ·	Tennis Classic of Macon	· 2026 →

Anna Blinkova was the defending champion but chose not to participate.

Renata Zarazúa won the title, after defeating Anna Rogers 6–2, 6–1 in the final.

== Seeds ==
1. (Mexico) Renata Zarazúa (champion)
2. (Czech Republic) Darja Vidmanová (semifinals)
3. (United States) Louisa Chirico (first round)
4. (Australia) Emerson Jones (semifinals)
5. Iryna Shymanovich (first round)
6. (Netherlands) Anouk Koevermans (first round)
7. Anastasia Gasanova (quarterfinals)
8. (Australia) Olivia Gadecki (quarterfinals, retired)

== Draw ==
Key

- Q = Qualifier
- WC = Wild card
- LL = Lucky loser
- Alt = Alternate
- ITF = ITF entry
- PR = Protected ranking
- SR = Special ranking
- SE = Special exempt
- JE = Junior exempt
- JR = Junior Accelerator Programme entrant
- CO = College Accelerator Programme entrant
- NG = Next Gen Accelerator Program entrant
- w/o = Walkover
- r = Retired
- d = Defaulted

=== Finals ===
Semifinals
1	(Mexico) Renata Zarazúa	6	6
4	(Australia) Emerson Jones	1	2
(United States) Anna Rogers	6	6
2	(Czech Republic) Darja Vidmanová	3	4

Final
1	(Mexico) Renata Zarazúa	6	6
(United States) Anna Rogers	2	1

=== Top half ===
First round
1	(Mexico) R Zarazúa	6	6
Q	(Egypt) M Refaat	1	3
(Turkey) İ Öz	5	3
Q	(Venezuela) SE Cabezas Domínguez	7	6
Q	(United States) J Failla	6	6
(Slovakia) M Okáľová	1	2
(United States) F Crawley	6^{7}	7^{7}	3
8	(Australia) O Gadecki	7^{9}	6^{5}	6
4	(Australia) E Jones	6	6
M Kozyreva	3	1
(United States) M Stoiana	4	7^{8}	3
(Canada) K Sebov	6	6^{6}	6
WC	(United States) E Schoppe	4	6	6^{5}
Q	E Laskevich	6	1	7^{7}
(Spain) A Herrero Liñana	3	1
7	A Gasanova	6	6

Second round
1	(Mexico) R Zarazúa	6	6
Q	(Venezuela) SE Cabezas Domínguez	2	3
Q	(United States) J Failla	6	6^{4}	4
8	(Australia) O Gadecki	3	7^{7}	6
4	(Australia) E Jones	2	6	6
(Canada) K Sebov	6	4	3
Q	E Laskevich	3	4
7	A Gasanova	6	6

Quarterfinals
1	(Mexico) R Zarazúa	6	2
8	(Australia) O Gadecki	3	2^{r}
4	(Australia) E Jones	1	6	6
7	A Gasanova	6	4	1

Semifinals
1	(Mexico) R Zarazúa	6	6
4	(Australia) E Jones	1	2

=== Bottom half ===
First round
6	(Netherlands) A Koevermans	3	6	3
Q	(Kenya) A Okutoyi	6	1	6
(United States) A Akli	6	6
Q	(United States) A Rodriguez	1	3
WC	(United States) DJ Bennett	4	7^{7}	3
WC	(United States) M Brengle	6	6^{0}	6
(United States) A Rogers	3	6	6
3	(United States) L Chirico	6	3	3
5	I Shymanovich	6^{4}	4
(United States) E Cayetano	7^{7}	6
Q	E Khayrutdinova	6	7
WC	(United States) R McAdoo	3	5
Q	(United States) M Lewis	0	3
SR	(United States) K Day	6	6
(Poland) O Lincer	3	0
2	(Czech Republic) D Vidmanová	6	6

Second round
Q	(Kenya) A Okutoyi	3	6	1
(United States) A Akli	6	1	6
WC	(United States) M Brengle	6	4	2
(United States) A Rogers	3	6	6
(United States) E Cayetano	1	4
Q	E Khayrutdinova	6	6
SR	(United States) K Day	3	4
2	(Czech Republic) D Vidmanová	6	6

Quarterfinals
(United States) A Akli	6	5	3
(United States) A Rogers	4	7	6
Q	E Khayrutdinova	3	6^{4}
2	(Czech Republic) D Vidmanová	6	7^{7}

Semifinals
(United States) A Rogers	6	6
2	(Czech Republic) D Vidmanová	3	4
