= 2023 Mercer Tennis Classic – Singles =

Singles
- 2023 Mercer Tennis Classic

Final
- Champion: (United States) Taylor Townsend
- Runner-up: (Hungary) Panna Udvardy
- Score: 6–3, 6–4

Events
Singles	Doubles
← 2022 ·	Tennis Classic of Macon	· 2024 →

Madison Brengle is the defending champion but chose not to participate.

Taylor Townsend won the title, defeating Panna Udvardy in the final, 6–3, 6–4.

== Seeds ==
1. (United States) Taylor Townsend (champion)
2. (United States) Kayla Day (semifinals)
3. (United States) Katie Volynets (semifinals)
4. (Hungary) Panna Udvardy (final)
5. (United States) Hailey Baptiste (second round)
6. (United States) Ann Li (second round)
7. (Argentina) Julia Riera (first round)
8. (Mexico) Renata Zarazúa (quarterfinals)

== Draw ==
=== Key ===
- Q = Qualifier
- WC = Wild card
- LL = Lucky loser
- Alt = Alternate
- SE = Special exempt
- PR = Protected ranking
- ITF = ITF entry
- JE = Junior exempt
- w/o = Walkover
- r = Retired
- d = Defaulted
- SR = Special ranking

=== Finals ===
Semifinals
1	(United States) Taylor Townsend	6	7^{7}
3	(United States) Katie Volynets	3	6^{4}
4	(Hungary) Panna Udvardy	6	3	6
2	(United States) Kayla Day	4	6	3

Final
1	(United States) Taylor Townsend	6	6
4	(Hungary) Panna Udvardy	3	4

=== Top half ===
First round
1	(United States) T Townsend	6	6
Q	(United States) V Hu	2	2
(United States) M Kessler	6	7
WC	(United States) C Harrison	1	5
(United States) G Min	6^{4}	5
(United States) M Jones	7^{7}	7
Q	(United States) A Urhobo	3	4
6	(United States) A Li	6	6
3	(United States) K Volynets	7^{7}	6
LL	(United States) A Rogers	6^{3}	3
(United States) E Kalieva	3	5
(United States) M Mateas	6	7
Q	(United States) V Osuigwe	1	1
Q	(United States) A Smith	6	6
Q	(Romania) G Lee	0	3
8	(Mexico) R Zarazúa	6	6

Second round
1	(United States) T Townsend	6	6
(United States) M Kessler	1	4
(United States) M Jones	6	6
6	(United States) A Li	3	4
3	(United States) K Volynets	6	6
(United States) M Mateas	3	2
Q	(United States) A Smith	1	2
8	(Mexico) R Zarazúa	6	6

Quarterfinals
1	(United States) T Townsend	6	6
(United States) M Jones	3	1
3	(United States) K Volynets	6	6
8	(Mexico) R Zarazúa	2	2

Semifinals
1	(United States) T Townsend	6	7^{7}
3	(United States) K Volynets	3	6^{4}

=== Bottom half ===
First round
5	(United States) H Baptiste	6	6
(United States) L Chirico	0	2
Q	(United States) A Lahey	1	1
(Cyprus) R Șerban	6	6
(Ukraine) Y Starodubtseva	6	6
(Mexico) M Zacarías	3	1
Q	(United States) R McAdoo	3	1
4	(Hungary) P Udvardy	6	6
7	(Argentina) J Riera	6^{6}	6^{3}
Q	(Germany) A Vecic	7^{8}	7^{7}
WC	(United States) A Noel	6	3
J Kolodynska	4	1^{r}
T Prozorova	6	6
A Tikhonova	3	2
(United States) S Chang	4	1
2	(United States) K Day	6	6

Second round
5	(United States) H Baptiste	7^{7}	6^{0}	4
(Cyprus) R Șerban	6^{5}	7^{7}	6
(Ukraine) Y Starodubtseva	2	4
4	(Hungary) P Udvardy	6	6
Q	(Germany) A Vecic	4	0
WC	(United States) A Noel	6	6
T Prozorova	4	1
2	(United States) K Day	6	6

Quarterfinals
(Cyprus) R Șerban	6^{6}	6	2
4	(Hungary) P Udvardy	7^{8}	3	6
WC	(United States) A Noel	7^{7}	3	5
2	(United States) K Day	6^{5}	6	7

Semifinals
4	(Hungary) P Udvardy	6	3	6
2	(United States) K Day	4	6	3
