= 2023 Mercer Tennis Classic – Doubles =

Doubles
- 2023 Mercer Tennis Classic

Final
- Champions: Jana Kolodynska; Tatiana Prozorova
- Runners-up: (United States) Sofia Sewing; Anastasia Tikhonova
- Score: 6–3, 6–2

Events
Singles	Doubles
← 2022 ·	Tennis Classic of Macon	· 2024 →

Anna Rogers and Christina Rosca are the defending champions but Rosca chose not to participate. Rogers played alongside Alana Smith, but lost in the first round to Jaeda Daniel and McCartney Kessler.

Jana Kolodynska and Tatiana Prozorova won the title, defeating Sofia Sewing and Anastasia Tikhonova in the final, 6–3, 6–2.

== Seeds ==
1. (United States) Sophie Chang / (United States) Ashley Lahey (first round)
2. (United States) Sofia Sewing / Anastasia Tikhonova (final)
3. (United States) Makenna Jones / (Ukraine) Yulia Starodubtseva (first round)
4. (United States) Anna Rogers / (United States) Alana Smith (first round)

== Draw ==
=== Key ===
- Q = Qualifier
- WC = Wild card
- LL = Lucky loser
- Alt = Alternate
- SE = Special exempt
- PR = Protected ranking
- ITF = ITF entry
- JE = Junior exempt
- w/o = Walkover
- r = Retired
- d = Defaulted
- SR = Special ranking

=== Draw ===
First round
1	(United States) S Chang (United States) A Lahey	2	0
J Kolodynska; T Prozorova	6	6
(United States) R McAdoo (France) M Partaud	1	2
WC	(United States) A Urhobo (United States) M Yamakita	6	6
4	(United States) A Rogers (United States) A Smith	6^{4}	6	[6]
(United States) J Daniel (United States) M Kessler	7^{7}	4	[10]
(United States) V Hu (United States) M Mateas	4	3
(United States) C Harrison (United States) E Kalieva	6	6
(Argentina) MS Krywoj (Argentina) J Riera	6	7
WC	(United States) C Beck (United States) A Markham	3	5
(Cyprus) R Șerban (Mexico) R Zarazúa	6	2	[10]
3	(United States) M Jones (Ukraine) Y Starodubtseva	4	6	[8]
WC	(United States) K Carnicella (United States) A Esposito Cogan	0	0
(United States) V Osuigwe (United States) W Osuigwe	6	6
(Bulgaria) L Karatancheva; M Kononova	2	1
2	(United States) S Sewing; A Tikhonova	6	6

Quarterfinals
J Kolodynska; T Prozorova	6	6
WC	(United States) A Urhobo (United States) M Yamakita	3	3
(United States) J Daniel (United States) M Kessler	6	6^{2}	[11]
(United States) C Harrison (United States) E Kalieva	4	7^{7}	[13]
(Argentina) MS Krywoj (Argentina) J Riera
(Cyprus) R Șerban (Mexico) R Zarazúa	w/o
(United States) V Osuigwe (United States) W Osuigwe	6	3	[9]
2	(United States) S Sewing; A Tikhonova	3	6	[11]

Semifinals
J Kolodynska; T Prozorova	1	6	[10]
(United States) C Harrison (United States) E Kalieva	6	4	[5]
(Cyprus) R Șerban (Mexico) R Zarazúa
2	(United States) S Sewing; A Tikhonova	w/o

Final
J Kolodynska; T Prozorova	6	6
2	(United States) S Sewing; A Tikhonova	3	2
