= 2025 Mercer Tennis Classic =

Tennis tournament

- Date: 13–20 October 2025
- Edition: 12th
- Category: ITF Women's World Tennis Tour
- Prize money: $100,000
- Surface: Hard / Outdoor
- Location: Macon, Georgia, United States

Champions

Singles
- (Mexico) Renata Zarazúa

Doubles
- (United States) Ayana Akli / (United States) Eryn Cayetano
← 2024 ·	Tennis Classic of Macon	· 2026 →

The 2025 Mercer Tennis Classic was a professional tennis tournament played on outdoor hard courts. It was the thirteenth edition of the tournament which was part of the 2025 ITF Women's World Tennis Tour. It took place in Macon, Georgia, United States between 13 and 19 October 2025.

== Champions ==
=== Singles ===
- (Mexico) Renata Zarazúa def. (United States) Anna Rogers, 6–2, 6–1.

=== Doubles ===
- (United States) Ayana Akli / (United States) Eryn Cayetano def. (United States) Rasheeda McAdoo / (Kenya) Angella Okutoyi, 6–7^{(4–7)}, 6–2, [16–14].

== Singles main draw entrants ==
=== Seeds ===
Country	Player	Rank^{1}	Seed
MEX	Renata Zarazúa	81	1
CZE	Darja Vidmanová	140	2
USA	Louisa Chirico	156	3
AUS	Emerson Jones	166	4
	Iryna Shymanovich	170	5
NED	Anouk Koevermans	171	6
	Anastasia Gasanova	202	7
AUS	Olivia Gadecki	233	8

- ^{1} Rankings are as of 6 October 2025.

=== Other entrants ===
The following players received wildcards into the singles main draw:

- (United States) DJ Bennett
- (United States) Madison Brengle
- (United States) Rasheeda McAdoo
- (United States) Ellie Schoppe

The following player received entry into the singles main draw using a special ranking:

- (United States) Kayla Day

The following players received entry from the qualifying draw:

- (Venezuela) Sofía Elena Cabezas Domínguez
- (United States) Jessica Failla
- Ekaterina Khayrutdinova
- Evialina Laskevich
- (United States) Mary Lewis
- (Kenya) Angella Okutoyi
- (Egypt) Merna Refaat
- (United States) Ava Rodriguez
