= 2024 Guimarães Ladies Open – Doubles =

Doubles
- 2024 Guimarães Ladies Open

Final
- Champions: (United States) Sophie Chang (United States) Rasheeda McAdoo
- Runners-up: (Portugal) Francisca Jorge (Portugal) Matilde Jorge
- Score: 7–6^{(8–6)}, 6–7^{(2–7)}, [10–5]

Events
Singles	Doubles
← 2023 ·	Guimarães Ladies Open	· 2025 →

Georgina García Pérez and Petra Hule were the defending champions but chose not to participate.

Sophie Chang and Rasheeda McAdoo won the title, defeating Francisca Jorge and Matilde Jorge in the final, 7–6^{(8–6)}, 6–7^{(2–7)}, [10–5].

== Seeds ==
1. (Portugal) Francisca Jorge / (Portugal) Matilde Jorge (final)
2. (United States) Sophie Chang / (United States) Rasheeda McAdoo (champions)
3. (United Kingdom) Madeleine Brooks / (Hong Kong) Eudice Chong (semifinals)
4. (India) Ankita Raina / (India) Prarthana Thombare (quarterfinals)

== Draw ==
=== Key ===
- Q = Qualifier
- WC = Wild card
- LL = Lucky loser
- Alt = Alternate
- ITF = ITF entry
- PR = Protected ranking
- SR = Special ranking
- SE = Special exempt
- JE = Junior exempt
- JR = Junior Accelerator Programme entrant
- CO = College Accelerator Programme entrant
- NG = Next Gen Accelerator Program entrant
- w/o = Walkover
- r = Retired
- d = Defaulted

First round
(Serbia) E Milovanović (Austria) T Paszek	5	4
(Switzerland) L Küng (India) V Shinde	7	6
4	(India) A Raina (India) P Thombare	1	6	[10]
(Czech Republic) G Knutson (Australia) A Parnaby	6	1	[8]
(Portugal) S Garakani (Portugal) S Lança	0	3
(India) R Bhosale; S Lansere	6	6
(United States) L Hovde (United States) M Sieg	6	6
(China) S Feng (Australia) A Osborne	2	4
(Lithuania) I Dapkutė (Ukraine) K Volodko	0	5
3	(United Kingdom) M Brooks (Hong Kong) E Chong	6	7
K Pavlova (China) F Tian	6	6
(Brazil) R Pereira (Netherlands) D Tran	4	2

Quarterfinals
1	(Portugal) F Jorge (Portugal) M Jorge	7^{7}	7
(Switzerland) L Küng (India) V Shinde	6^{2}	5
4	(India) A Raina (India) P Thombare	4	4
(India) R Bhosale; S Lansere	6	6
(United States) L Hovde (United States) M Sieg	4	2
3	(United Kingdom) M Brooks (Hong Kong) E Chong	6	6
K Pavlova (China) F Tian	1	3
2	(United States) S Chang (United States) R McAdoo	6	6

Semifinals
1	(Portugal) F Jorge (Portugal) M Jorge	7	7^{7}
(India) R Bhosale; S Lansere	5	6^{2}
3	(United Kingdom) M Brooks (Hong Kong) E Chong	4	6	[7]
2	(United States) S Chang (United States) R McAdoo	6	3	[10]

Final
1	(Portugal) F Jorge (Portugal) M Jorge	6^{6}	7^{7}	[5]
2	(United States) S Chang (United States) R McAdoo	7^{8}	6^{2}	[10]
