= 2025 Mercer Tennis Classic – Doubles =

Doubles
- 2025 Mercer Tennis Classic

Final
- Champions: (United States) Ayana Akli (United States) Eryn Cayetano
- Runners-up: (United States) Rasheeda McAdoo (Kenya) Angella Okutoyi
- Score: 6–7^{(4–7)}, 6–2, [16–14]

Events
Singles	Doubles
← 2024 ·	Tennis Classic of Macon	· 2026 →

Sophie Chang and Katarzyna Kawa were the defending champions but they chose not to participate.

Ayana Akli and Eryn Cayetano won the title, after defeating Rasheeda McAdoo and Angella Okutoyi 6–7^{(4–7)}, 6–2, [16–14] in the final.

== Seeds ==
1. Maria Kozyreva / Iryna Shymanovich (quarterfinals)
2. (United States) Carmen Corley / (United States) Ivana Corley (first round)
3. (United States) Jessica Failla / (United States) Anna Rogers (first round)
4. (Spain) Alicia Herrero Liñana / (United States) Dalayna Hewitt (first round)

== Draw ==
=== Key ===
- Q = Qualifier
- WC = Wild card
- LL = Lucky loser
- Alt = Alternate
- ITF = ITF entry
- PR = Protected ranking
- SR = Special ranking
- SE = Special exempt
- JE = Junior exempt
- JR = Junior Accelerator Programme entrant
- CO = College Accelerator Programme entrant
- NG = Next Gen Accelerator Program entrant
- w/o = Walkover
- r = Retired
- d = Defaulted

=== Draw ===
First round
1	M Kozyreva; I Shymanovich	6	6
(United States) M Brengle (United States) A Rodriguez	3	2
(Venezuela) SE Cabezas Domínguez (United States) F Crawley	2	4
(United States) M Stoiana (Czech Republic) D Vidmanová	6	6
3	(United States) J Failla (United States) A Rogers	6	6^{2}	[6]
A Gasanova; Y Hatouka	3	7^{7}	[10]
(United States) R McAdoo (Kenya) A Okutoyi	4	6	[10]
(United States) A Markham (Slovakia) M Okáľová	6	3	[1]
(United States) M Lewis (Turkey) İ Öz	6	4	[11]
WC	(United States) DJ Bennett (United States) B Payne	0	6	[9]
(United States) A Akli (United States) E Cayetano	6	6
4	(Spain) A Herrero Liñana (United States) D Hewitt	3	4
T Sasnouskaya (United States) C Tanguilig	6	6
(Australia) A Osborne (United States) A Rencheli	2	0
(Australia) O Gadecki (Poland) O Lincer	7^{7}	7
2	(United States) C Corley (United States) I Corley	6^{1}	5

Quarterfinals
1	M Kozyreva; I Shymanovich	3	4
(United States) M Stoiana (Czech Republic) D Vidmanová	6	6
A Gasanova; Y Hatouka	2	1
(United States) R McAdoo (Kenya) A Okutoyi	6	6
(United States) M Lewis (Turkey) İ Öz	3	6^{1}
(United States) A Akli (United States) E Cayetano	6	7^{7}
T Sasnouskaya (United States) C Tanguilig	5
(Australia) O Gadecki (Poland) O Lincer	6^{r}

Semifinals
(United States) M Stoiana (Czech Republic) D Vidmanová	4	6^{6}
(United States) R McAdoo (Kenya) A Okutoyi	6	7^{8}
(United States) A Akli (United States) E Cayetano	6	6
T Sasnouskaya (United States) C Tanguilig	3	4

Final
(United States) R McAdoo (Kenya) A Okutoyi	7^{7}	2	[14]
(United States) A Akli (United States) E Cayetano	6^{4}	6	[16]
