= 2024 Mercer Tennis Classic =

Tennis tournament

- Date: 14–20 October 2024
- Edition: 12th
- Category: ITF Women's World Tennis Tour
- Prize money: $100,000
- Surface: Hard / Outdoor
- Location: Macon, Georgia, United States

Champions

Singles
- Anna Blinkova

Doubles
- (United States) Sophie Chang / (Poland) Katarzyna Kawa
| ← 2023 · | Tennis Classic of Macon | · 2025 → |

The 2024 Mercer Tennis Classic was a professional tennis tournament played on outdoor hard courts. It was the twelfth edition of the tournament which was part of the 2024 ITF Women's World Tennis Tour. It took place in Macon, Georgia, United States between 14 and 20 October 2024.

== Champions ==
=== Singles ===
- Anna Blinkova def. (United States) Ann Li, 2–6, 6–2, 7–6^{(7–4)}

=== Doubles ===
- (United States) Sophie Chang / (Poland) Katarzyna Kawa def. (Brazil) Ingrid Martins / (United States) Quinn Gleason, 7–5, 6–4

== Singles main draw entrants ==
=== Seeds ===
| Country | Player | Rank^{1} | Seed |
|---|---|---|---|
| MEX | Renata Zarazúa | 72 | 1 |
| | Anna Blinkova | 84 | 2 |
| ARG | María Lourdes Carlé | 87 | 3 |
| AUS | Maya Joint | 113 | 4 |
| USA | Ann Li | 130 | 5 |
| ITA | Lucrezia Stefanini | 158 | 6 |
| AUS | Astra Sharma | 193 | 7 |
| | Anastasia Tikhonova | 195 | 8 |

- ^{1} Rankings are as of 7 October 2024.

=== Other entrants ===
The following players received wildcards into the singles main draw:

- (United States) Lauren Davis
- (United States) Lea Ma
- (United States) Katrina Scott

The following player received entry as a special exempt:

- (United States) Alana Smith

The following players received entry from the qualifying draw:

- (India) Rutuja Bhosale
- (United States) Elvina Kalieva
- Maria Kozyreva
- (Japan) Hiroko Kuwata
- (Slovakia) Martina Okáľová
- (United States) Whitney Osuigwe
- (Germany) Alexandra Vecic
- (Czech Republic) Darja Viďmanová
