= 2016 Tennis Classic of Macon =

- Date: 24–30 October
- Edition: 4th
- Category: ITF Women's Circuit
- Prize money: $50,000
- Surface: Hard
- Location: Macon, Georgia, United States

Champions

Singles
- (United States) Kayla Day

Doubles
- (Netherlands) Michaëlla Krajicek / (United States) Taylor Townsend
← 2015 ·	Tennis Classic of Macon	· 2017 →

The 2016 Tennis Classic of Macon was a professional tennis tournament played on outdoor hard courts. It was the 4th edition of the tournament and part of the 2016 ITF Women's Circuit, offering a total of $50,000 in prize money. It took place in Macon, Georgia, United States, on 24–30 October 2016.

== Singles main draw entrants ==
=== Seeds ===
Country	Player	Rank^{1}	Seed
USA	Samantha Crawford	105	1
USA	Jennifer Brady	113	2
SWE	Rebecca Peterson	128	3
USA	Grace Min	131	4
USA	Taylor Townsend	134	5
AUT	Barbara Haas	144	6
USA	Sachia Vickery	149	7
USA	Jessica Pegula	167	8

- ^{1} Rankings as of 17 October 2016.

=== Other entrants ===
The following player received a wildcard into the singles main draw:

- (Chile) Alexa Guarachi
- (United States) Danielle Lao
- (United States) Sabrina Santamaria
- (United States) Jessica Wacnik

The following players received entry from the qualifying draw:

- (United States) Emina Bektas
- (United States) Danielle Collins
- (United States) Alexandra Mueller
- (United States) Ingrid Neel

The following player received entry by a lucky loser spot:

- (United States) Ronit Yurovsky

== Champions ==
=== Singles ===
- (United States) Kayla Day def. (United States) Danielle Collins, 6–1, 6–3

=== Doubles ===
- (Netherlands) Michaëlla Krajicek / (United States) Taylor Townsend def. (United States) Sabrina Santamaria / (United States) Keri Wong, 3–6, 6–2, [10–6]
