= 2015 USTA Tennis Classic of Macon =

- Date: 26 October–1 November
- Edition: 3rd
- Category: ITF Women's Circuit
- Prize money: $50,000
- Surface: Hard
- Location: Macon, Georgia, United States

Champions

Singles
- (Sweden) Rebecca Peterson

Doubles
- (United States) Jan Abaza / (Switzerland) Viktorija Golubic
← 2014 ·	USTA Tennis Classic of Macon	· 2016 →

The 2015 USTA Tennis Classic of Macon was a professional tennis tournament played on outdoor hard courts. It was the third edition of the tournament and part of the 2015 ITF Women's Circuit, offering a total of $50,000 in prize money. It took place in Macon, Georgia, United States, on 26 October–1 November 2015.

== Singles main draw entrants ==
=== Seeds ===
Country	Player	Rank^{1}	Seed
USA	Anna Tatishvili	110	1
GBR	Naomi Broady	116	2
USA	Sachia Vickery	125	3
USA	Nicole Gibbs	129	4
SWE	Rebecca Peterson	138	5
ISR	Julia Glushko	139	6
SVK	Jana Čepelová	150	7
TUR	Çağla Büyükakçay	166	8

- ^{1} Rankings as of 19 October 2015

=== Other entrants ===
The following players received wildcards into the singles main draw:

- (United States) Robin Anderson
- (United States) Nicole Frenkel
- (Chile) Alexa Guarachi
- (United States) Sofia Kenin

The following players received entry from the qualifying draw:

- (United States) Jacqueline Cako
- (United States) Michaela Gordon
- (Latvia) Diāna Marcinkēviča
- (Argentina) Nadia Podoroska

== Champions ==
=== Singles ===
- (Sweden) Rebecca Peterson def. (United States) Anna Tatishvili, 6–3, 4–6, 6–1

=== Doubles ===
- (United States) Jan Abaza / (Switzerland) Viktorija Golubic def. (Brazil) Paula Cristina Gonçalves / (United States) Sanaz Marand, 7–6^{(7–3)}, 7–5
