= 2024 Mercer Tennis Classic – Doubles =

Doubles
- 2024 Mercer Tennis Classic

Final
- Champions: (United States) Sophie Chang (Poland) Katarzyna Kawa
- Runners-up: (Brazil) Ingrid Martins (United States) Quinn Gleason
- Score: 7–5, 6–4

Events
Singles	Doubles
← 2023 ·	Tennis Classic of Macon	· 2025 →

Jana Kolodynska and Tatiana Prozorova are the defending champions but they chose not to participate.

Sophie Chang and Katarzyna Kawa won the title, defeating Ingrid Martins and Quinn Gleason in the final; 7–5, 6–4.

== Seeds ==
1. (Brazil) Ingrid Martins / (United States) Quinn Gleason (final)
2. (United States) Sophie Chang / (Poland) Katarzyna Kawa (champions)
3. Anastasia Tikhonova / (Mexico) Renata Zarazúa (semifinals)
4. (United States) Whitney Osuigwe / (United States) Alana Smith (semifinals, withdrew)

== Draw ==
=== Key ===
- Q = Qualifier
- WC = Wild card
- LL = Lucky loser
- Alt = Alternate
- SE = Special exempt
- PR = Protected ranking
- ITF = ITF entry
- JE = Junior exempt
- w/o = Walkover
- r = Retired
- d = Defaulted
- SR = Special ranking

=== Draw ===
First round
1	(Brazil) I Martins (United States) Q Gleason	2	6	[10]
(United States) L Hovde (United States) M Sieg	6	0	[5]
(Australia) M Joint (Australia) A Sharma	6^{3}	2
M Kononova; M Kozyreva	7^{7}	0^{r}
3	A Tikhonova (Mexico) R Zarazúa	6	6
(United States) J Bedard (United States) E Schoppe	2	3
(United States) J DeFalco (United States) H Shaikh	6	6
WC	(Serbia) J Gojković (France) T Zivic	0	0
(United States) A Reami (United States) A Urhobo	0	1
(Spain) A Herrero Liñana (Argentina) M Krywoj	6	6
(India) R Bhosale (Japan) H Kuwata
4	(United States) W Osuigwe (United States) A Smith	w/o
(Czech Republic) M Bayerlová (Slovakia) M Okáľová	6	6
(China) J Han (Poland) O Lincer	2	2
(United States) E Kalieva (Ukraine) V Strakhova	5	4
2	(United States) S Chang (Poland) K Kawa	7	6

Quarterfinals
1	(Brazil) I Martins (United States) Q Gleason	6	6
(Australia) M Joint (Australia) A Sharma	3	1
3	A Tikhonova (Mexico) R Zarazúa	3	6	[10]
(United States) J DeFalco (United States) H Shaikh	6	0	[4]
(Spain) A Herrero Liñana (Argentina) M Krywoj	6	3	[13]
4	(United States) W Osuigwe (United States) A Smith	3	6	[15]
(Czech Republic) M Bayerlová (Slovakia) M Okáľová	4	2
2	(United States) S Chang (Poland) K Kawa	6	6

Semifinals
1	(Brazil) I Martins (United States) Q Gleason	2	6	[10]
3	A Tikhonova (Mexico) R Zarazúa	6	2	[7]
4	(United States) W Osuigwe (United States) A Smith
2	(United States) S Chang (Poland) K Kawa	w/o

Final
1	(Brazil) I Martins (United States) Q Gleason	5	4
2	(United States) S Chang (Poland) K Kawa	7	6
