= 2014 USTA Tennis Classic of Macon =

- Date: October 20–26
- Edition: 2nd
- Category: ITF Women's Circuit
- Prize money: $50,000
- Surface: Hard
- Location: Macon, Georgia, United States

Champions

Singles
- (Ukraine) Kateryna Bondarenko

Doubles
- (United States) Madison Brengle / (United States) Alexa Glatch
← 2013 ·	USTA Tennis Classic of Macon	· 2015 →

The 2014 USTA Tennis Classic of Macon was a professional tennis tournament played on outdoor hard courts. It was the second edition of the tournament which was part of the 2014 ITF Women's Circuit, offering a total of $50,000 in prize money. It took place in Macon, Georgia, United States, on October 20–26, 2014.

== Singles main draw entrants ==
=== Seeds ===
Country	Player	Rank^{1}	Seed
CRO	Mirjana Lučić-Baroni	65	1
USA	Madison Brengle	88	2
USA	Anna Tatishvili	99	3
USA	Grace Min	111	4
AUS	Olivia Rogowska	117	5
POR	Michelle Larcher de Brito	124	6
PAR	Verónica Cepede Royg	129	7
USA	Irina Falconi	130	8

- ^{1} Rankings as of October 13, 2014

=== Other entrants ===
The following players received wildcards into the singles main draw:

- (United States) Lauren Embree
- (United States) Ellie Halbauer
- (United States) Katerina Stewart

The following players received entry from the qualifying draw:

- (Ukraine) Kateryna Bondarenko
- (Brazil) Beatriz Haddad Maia
- (Italy) Jasmine Paolini
- (Slovenia) Petra Rampre

The following players received entry by a protected ranking:

- (Romania) Edina Gallovits-Hall

== Champions ==
=== Singles ===
- (Ukraine) Kateryna Bondarenko def. (United States) Grace Min 6–4, 7–5

=== Doubles ===
- (United States) Madison Brengle / (United States) Alexa Glatch def. (United States) Anna Tatishvili / (United States) Ashley Weinhold 6–0, 7–5
