= 2024 Guimarães Ladies Open – Singles =

Singles
- 2024 Guimarães Ladies Open

Final
- Champion: (Portugal) Francisca Jorge
- Runner-up: (United States) Liv Hovde
- Score: 6–3, 6–4

Events
Singles	Doubles
← 2023 ·	Guimarães Ladies Open	· 2025 →

Gabriela Knutson was the defending champion but she lost to Katherine Sebov in the quarterfinals.

Francisca Jorge won the title, defeating Liv Hovde in the final, 6–3, 6–4.

== Seeds ==
1. (Netherlands) Arianne Hartono (quarterfinals)
2. (Portugal) Francisca Jorge (champion)
3. (Australia) Priscilla Hon (second round, retired)
4. (Czech Republic) Gabriela Knutson (quarterfinals)
5. (Switzerland) Valentina Ryser (second round)
6. Sofya Lansere (first round)
7. (Canada) Katherine Sebov (semifinals)
8. (South Korea) Jang Su-jeong (first round)

== Draw ==
=== Key ===
- Q = Qualifier
- WC = Wild card
- LL = Lucky loser
- Alt = Alternate
- ITF = ITF entry
- PR = Protected ranking
- SR = Special ranking
- SE = Special exempt
- JE = Junior exempt
- JR = Junior Accelerator Programme entrant
- CO = College Accelerator Programme entrant
- NG = Next Gen Accelerator Program entrant
- w/o = Walkover
- r = Retired
- d = Defaulted

=== Finals ===
Semifinals
(United States) Liv Hovde	6	7
7	(Canada) Katherine Sebov	1	5
(Georgia (country)) Mariam Bolkvadze	0	1
2	(Portugal) Francisca Jorge	6	6

Final
(United States) Liv Hovde	3	4
2	(Portugal) Francisca Jorge	6	6

=== Top half ===
First round
1	(Netherlands) A Hartono	6	6
WC	(Spain) E Álvarez Sande	4	3
Q	(China) F Tian	6	6
(Hong Kong) E Chong	1	2
K Pavlova	2	3
(United States) L Hovde	6	6
(Ukraine) K Volodko	3	1
5	(Switzerland) V Ryser	6	6
4	(Czech Republic) G Knutson	6	7^{7}
(India) R Bhosale	2	6^{5}
WC	(Portugal) S Lança	2	0
(United States) M Sieg	6	6
Q	(Australia) A Parnaby	7	6
Q	(United States) S Chang	5	0
(Austria) T Paszek	6	3	0
7	(Canada) K Sebov	3	6	6

Second round
1	(Netherlands) A Hartono	7^{8}	7
Q	(China) F Tian	6^{6}	5
(United States) L Hovde	6	6
5	(Switzerland) V Ryser	1	0
4	(Czech Republic) G Knutson	6	6
(United States) M Sieg	0	0
Q	(Australia) A Parnaby	3	3
7	(Canada) K Sebov	6	6

Quarterfinals
1	(Netherlands) A Hartono	6^{2}	2
(United States) L Hovde	7^{7}	6
4	(Czech Republic) G Knutson	3	3
7	(Canada) K Sebov	6	6

Semifinals
(United States) L Hovde	6	7
7	(Canada) K Sebov	1	5

=== Bottom half ===
First round
8	(South Korea) S-j Jang	5	7	4
(Georgia (country)) M Bolkvadze	7	5	6
WC	(Portugal) A Voloshchuk	1	3
(India) A Raina	6	6
Q	(France) T Andrianjafitrimo	7	6
(Israel) L Glushko	5	0
Q	(Germany) C Werner	1	7	2
3	(Australia) P Hon	6	5	6
6	S Lansere	4	1
Q	(Portugal) M Jorge	6	6
Q	(Lithuania) I Dapkutė	6	6
WC	(Portugal) A Freitas	2	2
(France) M Léonard	6	5	4
Q	(Mexico) M Portillo Ramírez	1	7	6
(Switzerland) L Küng	3	0
2	(Portugal) F Jorge	6	6

Second round
(Georgia (country)) M Bolkvadze	6	6
(India) A Raina	1	4
Q	(France) T Andrianjafitrimo	3	7^{7}	3
3	(Australia) P Hon	6	6^{2}	1^{r}
Q	(Portugal) M Jorge	6	7^{7}
Q	(Lithuania) I Dapkutė	2	6^{5}
Q	(Mexico) M Portillo Ramírez	1	4
2	(Portugal) F Jorge	6	6

Quarterfinals
(Georgia (country)) M Bolkvadze	6	6
Q	(France) T Andrianjafitrimo	3	2
Q	(Portugal) M Jorge	3	2
2	(Portugal) F Jorge	6	6

Semifinals
(Georgia (country)) M Bolkvadze	0	1
2	(Portugal) F Jorge	6	6
