= 2024 Guimarães Ladies Open =

Tennis tournament

- Date: 10–16 June 2024
- Edition: 7th
- Category: ITF Women's World Tennis Tour
- Prize money: $60,000
- Surface: Hard / Outdoor
- Location: Guimarães, Portugal

Champions

Singles
- (Portugal) Francisca Jorge

Doubles
- (United States) Sophie Chang / (United States) Rasheeda McAdoo
← 2023 ·	Guimarães Ladies Open	· 2025 →

The 2024 Guimarães Ladies Open was a professional tennis tournament playing on outdoor hard courts. It was the seventh edition of the tournament, which was part of the 2024 ITF Women's World Tennis Tour. It took place in Guimarães, Portugal, between 10 and 16 June 2024.

== Champions ==
=== Singles ===
- (Portugal) Francisca Jorge def. (United States) Liv Hovde, 6–3, 6–4

=== Doubles ===
- (United States) Sophie Chang / (United States) Rasheeda McAdoo def. (Portugal) Francisca Jorge / (Portugal) Matilde Jorge, 7–6^{(8–6)}, 6–7^{(2–7)}, [10–5]

== Singles main draw entrants ==
=== Seeds ===
Country	Player	Rank	Seed
NED	Arianne Hartono	140	1
POR	Francisca Jorge	194	2
AUS	Priscilla Hon	211	3
CZE	Gabriela Knutson	215	4
SUI	Valentina Ryser	238	5
	Sofya Lansere	251	6
CAN	Katherine Sebov	252	7
KOR	Jang Su-jeong	261	8

- Rankings are as of 3 June 2024.

=== Other entrants ===
The following players received wildcards into the singles main draw:

- (Spain) Eva Álvarez Sande
- (Portugal) Analu Freitas
- (Portugal) Sara Lança
- (Portugal) Angelina Voloshchuk

The following players received entry from the qualifying draw:

- (France) Tessah Andrianjafitrimo
- (United States) Sophie Chang
- (Lithuania) Iveta Dapkutė
- (Portugal) Matilde Jorge
- (Australia) Alana Parnaby
- (Mexico) María Portillo Ramírez
- (China) Tian Fangran
- (Germany) Caroline Werner
