= 2025 Credit One Charleston Open – Doubles =

Doubles
- 2025 Credit One Charleston Open

Final
- Champions: (Latvia) Jeļena Ostapenko (New Zealand) Erin Routliffe
- Runners-up: (United States) Caroline Dolehide (United States) Desirae Krawczyk
- Score: 6–4, 6–2

Details
- Draw: 16
- Seeds: 4

Events
Singles	Doubles
← 2024 ·	Charleston Open	· 2026 →

Jeļena Ostapenko and Erin Routliffe defeated Caroline Dolehide and Desirae Krawczyk in the final, 6–4, 6–2 to win the doubles tennis title at the 2025 Charleston Open.

Ashlyn Krueger and Sloane Stephens were the reigning champions, but did not participate this year.

== Seeds ==
1. (Latvia) Jeļena Ostapenko / (New Zealand) Erin Routliffe (champions)
2. (Chinese Taipei) Chan Hao-ching / Veronika Kudermetova (quarterfinals)
3. (United States) Caroline Dolehide / (United States) Desirae Krawczyk (final)
4. (United States) Sofia Kenin / (Ukraine) Lyudmyla Kichenok (quarterfinals)

== Draw ==
=== Key ===
- Q = Qualifier
- WC = Wild card
- LL = Lucky loser
- Alt = Alternate
- ITF = ITF entry
- PR = Protected ranking
- SR = Special ranking
- SE = Special exempt
- JE = Junior exempt
- JR = Junior Accelerator Programme entrant
- CO = College Accelerator Programme entrant
- NG = Next Gen Accelerator Program entrant
- w/o = Walkover
- r = Retired
- d = Defaulted

=== Draw ===
First round
1	(Latvia) J Ostapenko (New Zealand) E Routliffe	2	6	[10]
(Bulgaria) V Tomova (United States) K Volynets	6	3	[2]
(Australia) O Gadecki (Japan) E Hozumi	6	2	[7]
E Alexandrova (China) S Zhang	3	6	[10]
4	(United States) S Kenin (Ukraine) L Kichenok	6	6
(Ukraine) N Kichenok (Indonesia) A Sutjiadi	1	2
PR	(United States) H Baptiste (United States) C McNally	6	6
(Chinese Taipei) F-h Wu (China) Y Xu	4	3
(United States) B Mattek-Sands (Czech Republic) L Šafářová	6	6
(United States) S Chang (United States) R McAdoo	1	1
WC	(United States) M Mateas (United States) A Smith	4	3
3	(United States) C Dolehide (United States) D Krawczyk	6	6
D Shnaider (United States) P Stearns	5	6	[10]
(Slovakia) T Mihalíková (United Kingdom) O Nicholls	7	1	[7]
(United Kingdom) H Dart (Mexico) G Olmos	4	1
2	(Chinese Taipei) H-c Chan; V Kudermetova	6	6

Quarterfinals
1	(Latvia) J Ostapenko (New Zealand) E Routliffe	7	6
E Alexandrova (China) S Zhang	5	3
4	(United States) S Kenin (Ukraine) L Kichenok	6^{6}	6^{2}
PR	(United States) H Baptiste (United States) C McNally	7^{8}	7^{7}
(United States) B Mattek-Sands (Czech Republic) L Šafářová	4	2
3	(United States) C Dolehide (United States) D Krawczyk	6	6
D Shnaider (United States) P Stearns	4	6	[11]
2	(Chinese Taipei) H-c Chan; V Kudermetova	6	3	[9]

Semifinals
1	(Latvia) J Ostapenko (New Zealand) E Routliffe	6	5	[10]
PR	(United States) H Baptiste (United States) C McNally	2	7	[6]
3	(United States) C Dolehide (United States) D Krawczyk	1	6	[10]
D Shnaider (United States) P Stearns	6	4	[7]

Final
1	(Latvia) J Ostapenko (New Zealand) E Routliffe	6	6
3	(United States) C Dolehide (United States) D Krawczyk	4	2
