= 2014 USTA Tennis Classic of Macon – Doubles =

Doubles
- 2014 USTA Tennis Classic of Macon

Final
- Champions: (United States) Madison Brengle (United States) Alexa Glatch
- Runners-up: (United States) Anna Tatishvili (United States) Ashley Weinhold
- Score: 6–0, 7–5

Events
Singles	Doubles
← 2013 ·	USTA Tennis Classic of Macon	· 2015 →

Kristi Boxx and Abigail Guthrie were the defending champions, but neither player chose to participate this year.

The wildcard pairing of Madison Brengle and Alexa Glatch won the tournament, defeating Anna Tatishvili and Ashley Weinhold in the all-American final, 6–0, 7–5.

== Seeds ==
1. (United States) Asia Muhammad / (Australia) Olivia Rogowska (quarterfinals)
2. (United States) Irina Falconi / (Croatia) Petra Martić (semifinals)
3. (Belarus) Ilona Kremen / (Russia) Marina Melnikova (first round)
4. (United States) Jan Abaza / (United States) Melanie Oudin (quarterfinals; withdrew)

== Draw ==
=== Key ===
- Q = Qualifier
- WC = Wild card
- LL = Lucky loser
- Alt = Alternate
- ITF = ITF entry
- PR = Protected ranking
- SR = Special ranking
- SE = Special exempt
- JE = Junior exempt
- JR = Junior Accelerator Programme entrant
- CO = College Accelerator Programme entrant
- NG = Next Gen Accelerator Program entrant
- w/o = Walkover
- r = Retired
- d = Defaulted

First round
1	(United States) A Muhammad (Australia) O Rogowska	6	6
(United States) L Chirico (United States) S Marand	1	2
WC	(United States) D Moreno-Kaste (United States) R Valdes	2	0
(United States) S Crawford (United States) S Vickery	6	6
4	(United States) J Abaza (United States) M Oudin	6	6
(United States) D Lao (United States) K Wong	3	3
(United States) A Mueller (United States) A Will	3	7	[11]
WC	(United States) M Brengle (United States) A Glatch	6	5	[13]
(Switzerland) C Perrin (South Africa) C Simmonds	1	3
(United States) A Tatishvili (United States) A Weinhold	6	6
(Ukraine) K Bondarenko (United States) J Cako	6	6
3	(Belarus) I Kremen (Russia) M Melnikova	2	4
WC	(United States) E Halbauer (Slovenia) P Rampre	4	3
(Brazil) B Haddad Maia (Greece) D Papamichail	6	6
(United States) J Brady (United States) L Embree	2	4
2	(United States) I Falconi (Croatia) P Martić	6	6

Quarterfinals
1	(United States) A Muhammad (Australia) O Rogowska	4	2
(United States) S Crawford (United States) S Vickery	6	6
4	(United States) J Abaza (United States) M Oudin
WC	(United States) M Brengle (United States) A Glatch	w/o
(United States) A Tatishvili (United States) A Weinhold	6	6
(Ukraine) K Bondarenko (United States) J Cako	3	3
(Brazil) B Haddad Maia (Greece) D Papamichail	0	3
2	(United States) I Falconi (Croatia) P Martić	6	6

Semifinals
(United States) S Crawford (United States) S Vickery	6	4	[6]
WC	(United States) M Brengle (United States) A Glatch	4	6	[10]
(United States) A Tatishvili (United States) A Weinhold	6	6
2	(United States) I Falconi (Croatia) P Martić	4	2

Final
WC	(United States) M Brengle (United States) A Glatch	6	7
(United States) A Tatishvili (United States) A Weinhold	0	5
