= 2016 Tennis Classic of Macon – Singles =

Singles
- 2016 Tennis Classic of Macon

Final
- Champion: (United States) Kayla Day
- Runner-up: (United States) Danielle Collins
- Score: 6–1, 6–3

Events
Singles	Doubles
← 2015 ·	Tennis Classic of Macon	· 2017 →

Rebecca Peterson was the defending champion, but lost to Danielle Collins in the semifinal.

Kayla Day won the title, defeating Collins in an all-American final, 6–1, 6–3.

== Seeds ==
1. (United States) Samantha Crawford (second round)
2. (United States) Jennifer Brady (second round)
3. (Sweden) Rebecca Peterson (semifinals)
4. (United States) Grace Min (semifinals)
5. (United States) Taylor Townsend (first round)
6. (Austria) Barbara Haas (second round)
7. (United States) Sachia Vickery (first round, retired)
8. (United States) Jessica Pegula (withdrew)

== Main draw ==
=== Key ===
- Q = Qualifier
- WC = Wild card
- LL = Lucky loser
- Alt = Alternate
- ITF = ITF entry
- PR = Protected ranking
- SR = Special ranking
- SE = Special exempt
- JE = Junior exempt
- JR = Junior Accelerator Programme entrant
- CO = College Accelerator Programme entrant
- NG = Next Gen Accelerator Program entrant
- w/o = Walkover
- r = Retired
- d = Defaulted

=== Finals ===
Semifinals
(United States) Kayla Day	6	7
4	(United States) Grace Min	2	5
3	(Sweden) Rebecca Peterson	2	0
Q	(United States) Danielle Collins	6	6

Final
(United States) Kayla Day	6	6
Q	(United States) Danielle Collins	1	3

=== Top half ===
First round
1	(United States) S Crawford	7	7^{7}
(Netherlands) M Krajicek	5	6^{4}
(United States) K Day	6	6
(United States) B Pera	2	3
(France) M Georges	4	5
(Bulgaria) S Karatantcheva	6	7
(United States) E Halbauer	1	3
LL	(United States) R Yurovsky	6	6
4	(United States) G Min	6	6
WC	(United States) S Santamaria	3	3
(Ukraine) E Ianchuk	6	2	3
(Turkey) B Eraydın	1	6	6
(United States) K Ahn	4	4
WC	(United States) D Lao	6	6
(United States) J Loeb	7	6
5	(United States) T Townsend	5	2

Second round
1	(United States) S Crawford	3	2
(United States) K Day	6	6
(Bulgaria) S Karatantcheva	6	7
LL	(United States) R Yurovsky	2	5
4	(United States) G Min	6	6
(Turkey) B Eraydın	2	4
WC	(United States) D Lao	5	2
(United States) J Loeb	7	6

Quarterfinals
(United States) K Day	6	6^{5}	7^{7}
(Bulgaria) S Karatantcheva	0	7^{7}	6^{4}
4	(United States) G Min	6	6
(United States) J Loeb	2	3

Semifinals
(United States) K Day	6	7
4	(United States) G Min	2	5

=== Bottom half ===
First round
6	(Austria) B Haas	6	1	6
(Portugal) M Larcher de Brito	4	6	2
(United States) M Oudin	1	6^{5}
(France) A Lim	6	7^{7}
WC	(United States) J Wacnik	6	1	1
Q	(United States) E Bektas	4	6	6
Q	(United States) I Neel	5	4
3	(Sweden) R Peterson	7	6
7	(United States) S Vickery	1	6	0^{r}
(United States) F Di Lorenzo	6	4	5
WC	(Chile) A Guarachi	4	0
(South Africa) C Simmonds	6	6
(United States) R Anderson	2	3
Q	(United States) D Collins	6	6
Q	(United States) A Mueller	1	2
2	(United States) J Brady	6	6

Second round
6	(Austria) B Haas	1	3
(France) A Lim	6	6
Q	(United States) E Bektas	2	4
3	(Sweden) R Peterson	6	6
(United States) F Di Lorenzo	6	6
(South Africa) C Simmonds	4	2
Q	(United States) D Collins	7	7^{7}
2	(United States) J Brady	5	6^{2}

Quarterfinals
(France) A Lim	3	6	4
3	(Sweden) R Peterson	6	3	6
(United States) F Di Lorenzo	1	5
Q	(United States) D Collins	6	7

Semifinals
3	(Sweden) R Peterson	2	0
Q	(United States) D Collins	6	6
