= 2016 Tennis Classic of Macon – Doubles =

Doubles
- 2016 Tennis Classic of Macon

Final
- Champions: (Netherlands) Michaëlla Krajicek (United States) Taylor Townsend
- Runners-up: (United States) Sabrina Santamaria (United States) Keri Wong
- Score: 3–6, 6–2, [10–6]

Events
Singles	Doubles
← 2015 ·	Tennis Classic of Macon	· 2017 →

Jan Abaza and Viktorija Golubic were the defending champions, but Golubic chose not to participate. Abaza partnered Alyona Sotnikova, but they lost in the quarterfinals.

Michaëlla Krajicek and Taylor Townsend won the title, defeating Sabrina Santamaria and Keri Wong in the final, 3–6, 6–2, [10–6].

== Seeds ==
1. (Netherlands) Michaëlla Krajicek / (United States) Taylor Townsend (champions)
2. (France) Alizé Lim / (Sweden) Rebecca Peterson (first round)
3. (United States) Sanaz Marand / (United States) Ingrid Neel (quarterfinals)
4. (Bosnia and Herzegovina) Ema Burgić Bucko / (Bosnia and Herzegovina) Jasmina Tinjić (first round)

== Draw ==
=== Key ===
- Q = Qualifier
- WC = Wild card
- LL = Lucky loser
- Alt = Alternate
- SE = Special exempt
- PR = Protected ranking
- ITF = ITF entry
- JE = Junior exempt
- w/o = Walkover
- r = Retired
- d = Defaulted
- SR = Special ranking

First round
1	(Netherlands) M Krajicek (United States) T Townsend	6	7^{7}
(Austria) P König (United States) J Wacnik	1	6^{3}
(United States) S Chang (United States) A Mueller	3	7^{9}	[10]
(United States) E Bektas (United States) R Yurovsky	6	6^{7}	[4]
4	(Bosnia and Herzegovina) E Burgić Bucko (Bosnia and Herzegovina) J Tinjić	6	3	[4]
(United States) K Ahn (United States) J Loeb	2	6	[10]
WC	(Chile) A Guarachi (Greece) A Stavroulaki	4	6	[8]
(United States) J Abaza (Ukraine) A Sotnikova	6	0	[10]
(United States) B Pera (South Africa) C Simmonds	2	3
(United States) S Crawford (United States) M Oudin	6	6
WC	(United States) Q Gleason (United States) A Rodgers	0	1
3	(United States) S Marand (United States) I Neel	6	6
(Ukraine) Y Beygelzimer (Turkey) B Eraydın	7^{7}	0	[4]
WC	(United States) C Harrison (United States) J Ho	6^{4}	6	[10]
(United States) S Santamaria (United States) K Wong	1	7^{7}	[10]
2	(France) A Lim (Sweden) R Peterson	6	6^{4}	[7]

Quarterfinals
1	(Netherlands) M Krajicek (United States) T Townsend	6	6
(United States) S Chang (United States) A Mueller	4	1
(United States) K Ahn (United States) J Loeb	6	6
(United States) J Abaza (Ukraine) A Sotnikova	3	3
(United States) S Crawford (United States) M Oudin	7^{8}	3	[10]
3	(United States) S Marand (United States) I Neel	6^{6}	6	[5]
WC	(United States) C Harrison (United States) J Ho	4	6	[9]
(United States) S Santamaria (United States) K Wong	6	4	[11]

Semifinals
1	(Netherlands) M Krajicek (United States) T Townsend	6	6
(United States) K Ahn (United States) J Loeb	4	2
(United States) S Crawford (United States) M Oudin	7^{7}	4	[6]
(United States) S Santamaria (United States) K Wong	6^{4}	6	[10]

Final
1	(Netherlands) M Krajicek (United States) T Townsend	3	6	[10]
(United States) S Santamaria (United States) K Wong	6	2	[6]
