= 2025 Credit One Charleston Open – Singles =

Singles
- 2025 Credit One Charleston Open

Final
- Champion: (United States) Jessica Pegula
- Runner-up: (United States) Sofia Kenin
- Score: 6–3, 7–5

Details
- Draw: 48
- Seeds: 16

Events
Singles	Doubles
← 2024 ·	Charleston Open	· 2026 →

Jessica Pegula defeated Sofia Kenin 6–3, 7–5 to win the singles tennis title at the 2025 Charleston Open. It was her eighth WTA Tour title, and first on clay.

Danielle Collins was the defending champion, but lost in the quarterfinals to Pegula.

== Seeds ==
All seeds received a bye into the second round.

1. (United States) Jessica Pegula (champion)
2. (United States) Madison Keys (third round)
3. (China) Zheng Qinwen (quarterfinals)
4. (United States) Emma Navarro (quarterfinals)
5. (Australia) Daria Kasatkina (third round)
6. Diana Shnaider (third round)
7. (United States) Danielle Collins (quarterfinals)
8. (United States) Amanda Anisimova (semifinals, retired)
9. Ekaterina Alexandrova (semifinals)
10. (Kazakhstan) Yulia Putintseva (third round)
11. (Latvia) Jeļena Ostapenko (third round)
12. (Poland) Magdalena Fręch (withdrew)
13. (Belgium) Elise Mertens (third round)
14. Anna Kalinskaya (quarterfinals)
15. (United States) Ashlyn Krueger (third round)
16. (United States) Peyton Stearns (second round)
17. (Switzerland) Belinda Bencic (second round)

Click on the seed number of a player to go to their draw section.

== Draw ==
Key

- Q = Qualifier
- WC = Wild card
- LL = Lucky loser
- Alt = Alternate
- ITF = ITF entry
- PR = Protected ranking
- SR = Special ranking
- SE = Special exempt
- JE = Junior exempt
- JR = Junior Accelerator Programme entrant
- CO = College Accelerator Programme entrant
- NG = Next Gen Accelerator Program entrant
- w/o = Walkover
- r = Retired
- d = Defaulted

=== Finals ===
Quarterfinals
1	(United States) Jessica Pegula	1	6	6
7	(United States) Danielle Collins	6	3	0
3	(China) Zheng Qinwen	1	4
9	Ekaterina Alexandrova	6	6
8	(United States) Amanda Anisimova	7	7^{7}
4	(United States) Emma Navarro	5	6^{1}
(United States) Sofia Kenin	6	6
14	Anna Kalinskaya	4	3

Semifinals
1	(United States) Jessica Pegula	6	2	7
9	Ekaterina Alexandrova	2	6	5
8	(United States) Amanda Anisimova	2^{r}
(United States) Sofia Kenin	5

Final
1	(United States) Jessica Pegula	6	7
(United States) Sofia Kenin	3	5

=== Top half ===
==== Section 1 ====
First round
WC	(United Kingdom) H Watson	6^{8}	4
Q	I Shymanovich	7^{10}	6
(Australia) A Tomljanović	3	6	6
LL	(Japan) K Okamura	6	1	2
Q	(United States) L Chirico	6	3	6
E Andreeva	4	6	4
(Bulgaria) V Tomova	1	3
(United States) R Montgomery	6	6

Second round
1	(United States) J Pegula	6	6
Q	I Shymanovich	0	3
(Australia) A Tomljanović	6	6
16	(United States) P Stearns	1	4
11	(Latvia) J Ostapenko	7	6
Q	(United States) L Chirico	5	2
(United States) R Montgomery	3	1
7	(United States) D Collins	6	6

Third round
1	(United States) J Pegula	6	6
(Australia) A Tomljanović	3	2
11	(Latvia) J Ostapenko	5	3
7	(United States) D Collins	7	6

Quarterfinals
1	(United States) J Pegula	1	6	6
7	(United States) D Collins	6	3	0

==== Section 2 ====
First round
(Greece) M Sakkari	6	6
WC	(Canada) M Stakusic	3	2
(United Kingdom) H Dart	1	6	1
(France) V Gracheva	6	3	6
(United States) A Li	6	6
A Blinkova	4	3
P Kudermetova	6	6
(Romania) I-C Begu	3	4

Second round
3	(China) Q Zheng	6	6
(Greece) M Sakkari	4	1
(France) V Gracheva	3	5
13	(Belgium) E Mertens	6	7
9	E Alexandrova	6	6
(United States) A Li	3	0
P Kudermetova	3	2
6	D Shnaider	6	6

Third round
3	(China) Q Zheng	6	3	6
13	(Belgium) E Mertens	3	6	3
9	E Alexandrova	6	6
6	D Shnaider	2	1

Quarterfinals
3	(China) Q Zheng	1	4
9	E Alexandrova	6	6

=== Bottom half ===
==== Section 3 ====
First round
WC	(United States) M Mateas	0	2
V Kudermetova	6	6
Q	(China) S Zhang	7	5	6
(Italy) L Bronzetti	5	7	4
(United States) K Volynets	6	6
Q	(Canada) K Sebov	0	0
(Australia) O Gadecki	2	4
(United States) H Baptiste	6	6

Second round
8	(United States) A Anisimova	6	6
V Kudermetova	2	2
Q	(China) S Zhang	6^{5}	1
10	(Kazakhstan) Y Putintseva	7^{7}	6
15	(United States) A Krueger	6	7^{7}
(United States) K Volynets	3	6^{4}
(United States) H Baptiste	4	3
4	(United States) E Navarro	6	6

Third round
8	(United States) A Anisimova	6	6
10	(Kazakhstan) Y Putintseva	4	4
15	(United States) A Krueger	6	4	2
4	(United States) E Navarro	4	6	6

Quarterfinals
8	(United States) A Anisimova	7	7^{7}
4	(United States) E Navarro	5	6^{1}

==== Section 4 ====
First round
WC	(United States) L Davis	3	6	6
Q	(United States) J Loeb	6	1	3
(United States) S Kenin	6	6
(United States) B Pera	3	4
(Ukraine) A Kalinina	6	1	4
Q	(United States) C McNally	4	6	6
(United States) C Dolehide	6	6
(Italy) E Cocciaretto	4	1

Second round
5	(Australia) D Kasatkina	6	6
WC	(United States) L Davis	1	1
(United States) S Kenin	6	6
17	(Switzerland) B Bencic	0	3
14	A Kalinskaya	6	6
Q	(United States) C McNally	1	4
(United States) C Dolehide	3	6^{4}
2	(United States) M Keys	6	7^{7}

Third round
5	(Australia) D Kasatkina	3	6^{7}
(United States) S Kenin	6	7^{9}
14	A Kalinskaya	6	6
2	(United States) M Keys	2	4

Quarterfinals
(United States) S Kenin	6	6
14	A Kalinskaya	4	3

== Qualifying ==
=== Seeds ===
1. (United Kingdom) Harriet Dart (moved to main draw)
2. (United States) Louisa Chirico (qualified)
3. (China) Zhang Shuai (qualified)
4. (Japan) Kyōka Okamura (qualifying competition, lucky loser)
5. (Australia) Arina Rodionova (first round, retired)
6. Iryna Shymanovich (qualified)
7. (United States) Sophie Chang (first round)
8. (Japan) Mei Yamaguchi (first round)
9. (United States) Elvina Kalieva (qualifying competition)
10. (United States) Claire Liu (qualifying competition)
11. (Sweden) Kajsa Rinaldo Persson (qualifying competition)
12. (Canada) Katherine Sebov (qualified)

=== Qualifiers ===
1. (United States) Jamie Loeb
2. (United States) Louisa Chirico
3. (China) Zhang Shuai
4. (Canada) Katherine Sebov
5. (United States) Caty McNally
6. Iryna Shymanovich

=== Lucky loser ===
1. (Japan) Kyōka Okamura

=== Draw ===
==== First qualifier ====
First round				Qualifying competition
					(Japan) Eri Hozumi	2	7	1
				WC	(United States) Jamie Loeb	6	5	6
WC	(United States) Jamie Loeb	6	6	WC	(United States) Jamie Loeb	6	5	6
8	(Japan) Mei Yamaguchi	0	4

==== Second qualifier ====
First round
2	(United States) Louisa Chirico	6	6
(Croatia) Ana Konjuh	4	4
(Mexico) Fernanda Contreras	1	2
11	(Sweden) Kajsa Rinaldo Persson	6	6

Qualifying competition
2	(United States) Louisa Chirico	6^{4}	6	7
11	(Sweden) Kajsa Rinaldo Persson	7^{7}	3	5

==== Third qualifier ====
First round
3	(China) Zhang Shuai	6	6
WC	(United States) Haley Giavara	4	1
(United States) Bethanie Mattek-Sands	6	6
7	(United States) Sophie Chang	3	1

Qualifying competition
3	(China) Zhang Shuai	4	7	6
(United States) Bethanie Mattek-Sands	6	5	1

==== Fourth qualifier ====
First round
4	(Japan) Kyōka Okamura	6	6
WC	(Czech Republic) Anna Dvořáčková	2	2
(Romania) Gabriela Lee	0	4
12	(Canada) Katherine Sebov	6	6

Qualifying competition
4	(Japan) Kyōka Okamura	4	2
12	(Canada) Katherine Sebov	6	6

==== Fifth qualifier ====
First round
5	(Australia) Arina Rodionova	1	0^{r}
(United States) Caty McNally	6	3
(United States) Alana Smith	4	2
10	(United States) Claire Liu	6	6

Qualifying competition
(United States) Caty McNally	6	6
10	(United States) Claire Liu	1	3

==== Sixth qualifier ====
First round
6	Iryna Shymanovich	6	0	6
(Ukraine) Lyudmyla Kichenok	2	6	3
(Chinese Taipei) Chan Hao-ching	2	1
9	(United States) Elvina Kalieva	6	6

Qualifying competition
6	Iryna Shymanovich	7^{8}	6
9	(United States) Elvina Kalieva	6^{6}	4
