= 2015 USTA Tennis Classic of Macon – Singles =

Singles
- 2015 USTA Tennis Classic of Macon

Final
- Champion: (Sweden) Rebecca Peterson
- Runner-up: (United States) Anna Tatishvili
- Score: 6–3, 4–6, 6–1

Events
Singles	Doubles
← 2014 ·	USTA Tennis Classic of Macon	· 2016 →

Kateryna Bondarenko was the defending champion, but chose not to participate.

Rebecca Peterson won the title, defeating Anna Tatishvili in the final, 6–3, 4–6, 6–1.

== Seeds ==
1. (United States) Anna Tatishvili (final)
2. (United Kingdom) Naomi Broady (second round)
3. (United States) Sachia Vickery (first round)
4. (United States) Nicole Gibbs (quarterfinals)
5. (Sweden) Rebecca Peterson (champion)
6. (Israel) Julia Glushko (quarterfinals)
7. (Slovakia) Jana Čepelová (first round)
8. (Turkey) Çağla Büyükakçay (quarterfinals)

== Draw ==
=== Key ===
- Q = Qualifier
- WC = Wild card
- LL = Lucky loser
- Alt = Alternate
- SE = Special exempt
- PR = Protected ranking
- ITF = ITF entry
- JE = Junior exempt
- w/o = Walkover
- r = Retired
- d = Defaulted
- SR = Special ranking

=== Finals ===
Semifinals
1	(United States) Anna Tatishvili	6	6
(United States) Julia Boserup	4	0
5	(Sweden) Rebecca Peterson	6	6
(Netherlands) Lesley Kerkhove	2	3

Final
1	(United States) Anna Tatishvili	3	6	1
5	(Sweden) Rebecca Peterson	6	4	6

=== Top half ===
First round
1	(United States) A Tatishvili	6	6
(Austria) B Haas	3	3
WC	(United States) N Frenkel	5	6	6
(Mexico) M Zacarías	7	3	2
(United States) K Stewart	3	6	6
(United States) G Min	6	3	2
(Paraguay) M González	4	3
6	(Israel) J Glushko	6	6
4	(United States) N Gibbs	6	6
(Argentina) M Irigoyen	1	0
(Argentina) F Molinero	5	6	6
Q	(Latvia) D Marckinēviča	7	3	4
WC	(United States) S Kenin	6^{4}	0
(United States) S Marand	7^{7}	6
(United States) J Boserup	6	6
7	(Slovakia) J Čepelová	0	4

Second round
1	(United States) A Tatishvili	6	6
WC	(United States) N Frenkel	2	3
(United States) K Stewart	0	1
6	(Israel) J Glushko	6	6
4	(United States) N Gibbs	6	6
(Argentina) F Molinero	4	3
(United States) S Marand	2	2
(United States) J Boserup	6	6

Quarterfinals
1	(United States) A Tatishvili	6	7^{7}
6	(Israel) J Glushko	1	6^{2}
4	(United States) N Gibbs	3	7^{7}	5
(United States) J Boserup	6	6^{3}	7

Semifinals
1	(United States) A Tatishvili	6	6
(United States) J Boserup	4	0

=== Bottom half ===
First round
5	(Sweden) R Peterson	6	6
(Mexico) V Rodríguez	2	1
Q	(United States) J Cako	4	7	7^{7}
Q	(United States) M Gordon	6	5	6^{4}
(United States) J Brady	2	6	6
(Paraguay) V Cepede Royg	6	3	4
WC	(United States) R Anderson	6	6
3	(United States) S Vickery	2	2
8	(Turkey) Ç Büyükakçay	6	6
WC	(Chile) A Guarachi	2	0
(Switzerland) V Golubic	6	6
(Argentina) P Ormaechea	4	1
(Netherlands) L Kerkhove	6	6
(Bulgaria) E Kostova	2	0
Q	(Argentina) N Podoroska	4	3
2	(United Kingdom) N Broady	6	6

Second round
5	(Sweden) R Peterson	6	6
Q	(United States) J Cako	2	1
(United States) J Brady	6	4	6
WC	(United States) R Anderson	3	6	3
8	(Turkey) Ç Büyükakçay	6	3	6
(Switzerland) V Golubic	3	6	2
(Netherlands) L Kerkhove	6^{2}	6	6
2	(United Kingdom) N Broady	7^{7}	4	4

Quarterfinals
5	(Sweden) R Peterson	2	7	6
(United States) J Brady	6	5	1
8	(Turkey) Ç Büyükakçay	6	3	2
(Netherlands) L Kerkhove	2	6	6

Semifinals
5	(Sweden) R Peterson	6	6
(Netherlands) L Kerkhove	2	3
