= 2015 USTA Tennis Classic of Macon – Doubles =

Doubles
- 2015 USTA Tennis Classic of Macon

Final
- Champions: (United States) Jan Abaza (Switzerland) Viktorija Golubic
- Runners-up: (Brazil) Paula Cristina Gonçalves (United States) Sanaz Marand
- Score: 7–6^{(7–3)}, 7–5

Events
Singles	Doubles
← 2014 ·	USTA Tennis Classic of Macon	· 2016 →

Madison Brengle and Alexa Glatch were the defending champions, but both players chose not to participate.

Jan Abaza and Viktorija Golubic won the title, defeating Paula Cristina Gonçalves and Sanaz Marand in the final, 7–6^{(7–3)}, 7–5.

== Seeds ==
1. (Brazil) Paula Cristina Gonçalves / (United States) Sanaz Marand (final)
2. (Paraguay) Verónica Cepede Royg / (Argentina) María Irigoyen (semifinals)
3. (Israel) Julia Glushko / (Sweden) Rebecca Peterson (first round)
4. (United States) Jan Abaza / (Switzerland) Viktorija Golubic (champions)

== Draw ==
=== Key ===
- Q = Qualifier
- WC = Wild card
- LL = Lucky loser
- Alt = Alternate
- SE = Special exempt
- PR = Protected ranking
- ITF = ITF entry
- JE = Junior exempt
- w/o = Walkover
- r = Retired
- d = Defaulted
- SR = Special ranking

=== Draw ===
First round
1	(Brazil) PC Gonçalves (United States) S Marand	6	3	[10]
WC	(United States) I Neel (United States) K Stewart	2	6	[6]
(Bulgaria) E Kostova (Argentina) P Ormaechea	4	1
(Argentina) F Molinero (Serbia) N Stojanović	6	6
3	(Israel) J Glushko (Sweden) R Peterson	4	4
(United States) S Chang (Netherlands) L Kerkhove	6	6
(Latvia) D Marcinkēviča (Mexico) R Zarazúa	1	1
(United States) J Boserup (United Kingdom) N Broady	6	6
(United States) N Gibbs (United States) V King	2	6	[7]
(United States) J Brady (Chile) A Guarachi	6	1	[10]
(United States) J Cako (United States) S Vickery	2	2
4	(United States) J Abaza (Switzerland) V Golubic	6	6
(South Africa) M Sammons (South Africa) C Simmonds	6	6
(Mexico) V Rodríguez (Mexico) M Zacarías	2	3
(Russia) A Gabueva (Ukraine) A Sotnikova	4	1
2	(Paraguay) V Cepede Royg (Argentina) M Irigoyen	6	6

Quarterfinals
1	(Brazil) PC Gonçalves (United States) S Marand	6	6
(Argentina) F Molinero (Serbia) N Stojanović	2	2
(United States) S Chang (Netherlands) L Kerkhove	6	1	[10]
(United States) J Boserup (United Kingdom) N Broady	3	6	[3]
(United States) J Brady (Chile) A Guarachi	4	4
4	(United States) J Abaza (Switzerland) V Golubic	6	6
(South Africa) M Sammons (South Africa) C Simmonds	3	1
2	(Paraguay) V Cepede Royg (Argentina) M Irigoyen	6	6

Semifinals
1	(Brazil) PC Gonçalves (United States) S Marand	3	6	[10]
(United States) S Chang (Netherlands) L Kerkhove	6	4	[8]
4	(United States) J Abaza (Switzerland) V Golubic	6	3	[10]
2	(Paraguay) V Cepede Royg (Argentina) M Irigoyen	3	6	[5]

Final
1	(Brazil) PC Gonçalves (United States) S Marand	6^{3}	5
4	(United States) J Abaza (Switzerland) V Golubic	7^{7}	7
