= 2024 Mercer Tennis Classic – Singles =

Singles
- 2024 Mercer Tennis Classic

Final
- Champion: Anna Blinkova
- Runner-up: (United States) Ann Li
- Score: 2–6, 6–2, 7–6^{(7–4)}

Events
Singles	Doubles
← 2023 ·	Tennis Classic of Macon	· 2025 →

Taylor Townsend is the defending champion but chose not to participate.

Anna Blinkova won the title, defeating Ann Li in the final; 2–6, 6–2, 7–6^{(7–4)}.

== Seeds ==
1. (Mexico) Renata Zarazúa (quarterfinals)
2. Anna Blinkova (champion)
3. (Argentina) María Lourdes Carlé (second round)
4. (Australia) Maya Joint (second round)
5. (United States) Ann Li (final)
6. (Italy) Lucrezia Stefanini (quarterfinals)
7. (Australia) Astra Sharma (second round)
8. Anastasia Tikhonova (second round)

== Draw ==
=== Key ===
- Q = Qualifier
- WC = Wild card
- LL = Lucky loser
- Alt = Alternate
- ITF = ITF entry
- PR = Protected ranking
- SR = Special ranking
- SE = Special exempt
- JE = Junior exempt
- JR = Junior Accelerator Programme entrant
- CO = College Accelerator Programme entrant
- NG = Next Gen Accelerator Program entrant
- w/o = Walkover
- r = Retired
- d = Defaulted

=== Finals ===
Semifinals
5	(United States) Ann Li	6	6
WC	(United States) Lauren Davis	3	4
(Poland) Katarzyna Kawa	6	0	4
2	Anna Blinkova	4	6	6

Final
5	(United States) Ann Li	6	2	6^{4}
2	Anna Blinkova	2	6	7^{7}

=== Top half ===
First round
1	(Mexico) R Zarazúa	6	6
(Ukraine) V Strakhova	1	4
(United States) L Hovde	6	6
SE	(United States) A Smith	4	2
Q	(United States) E Kalieva	6	6
Q	(Japan) H Kuwata	3	2
Q	(Germany) A Vecic	0^{r}
5	(United States) A Li	5
4	(Australia) M Joint	6	1
Q	(India) R Bhosale	3	1^{r}
WC	(United States) L Davis	6	6
WC	(United States) K Scott	3	1
(United States) L Chirico	6	3	2
A Korneeva	4	6	6
Q	(United States) W Osuigwe	1	6	2
6	(Italy) L Stefanini	6	3	6

Second round
1	(Mexico) R Zarazúa	6	6
(United States) L Hovde	0	1
Q	(United States) E Kalieva	3	1
5	(United States) A Li	6	6
4	(Australia) M Joint	1	1
WC	(United States) L Davis	6	6
A Korneeva	2	2
6	(Italy) L Stefanini	6	6

Quarterfinals
1	(Mexico) R Zarazúa	1	4
5	(United States) A Li	6	6
WC	(United States) L Davis	7^{9}	6^{3}	6
6	(Italy) L Stefanini	6^{7}	7^{7}	2

Semifinals
5	(United States) A Li	6	6
WC	(United States) L Davis	3	4

=== Bottom half ===
First round
7	(Australia) A Sharma	7^{7}	5	6
I Shymanovich	6^{5}	7	0
(India) S Yamalapalli	6	4	2
(Poland) K Kawa	4	6	6
(United States) A Urhobo	2	2
WC	(United States) L Ma	6	6
Q	M Kozyreva	3	1
3	(Argentina) ML Carlé	6	6
8	A Tikhonova	7^{7}	6
(United States) S Chang	6^{4}	4
(United States) V Hu	7	3	6^{7}
Q	(Czech Republic) D Viďmanová	5	6	7^{9}
(United States) H Chang	2	4
Q	(Slovakia) M Okáľová	6	6
(United States) M Sieg	2	0
2	A Blinkova	6	6

Second round
7	(Australia) A Sharma	5	4
(Poland) K Kawa	7	6
WC	(United States) L Ma	6	6
3	(Argentina) ML Carlé	3	1
8	A Tikhonova	0	5
Q	(Czech Republic) D Viďmanová	6	7
Q	(Slovakia) M Okáľová	0	2
2	A Blinkova	6	6

Quarterfinals
(Poland) K Kawa	6	6
WC	(United States) L Ma	4	3
Q	(Czech Republic) D Viďmanová	3	0
2	A Blinkova	6	6

Semifinals
(Poland) K Kawa	6	0	4
2	A Blinkova	4	6	6
