= 2014 USTA Tennis Classic of Macon – Singles =

Singles
- 2014 USTA Tennis Classic of Macon

Final
- Champion: (Ukraine) Kateryna Bondarenko
- Runner-up: (United States) Grace Min
- Score: 6–4, 7–5

Events
Singles	Doubles
← 2013 ·	USTA Tennis Classic of Macon	· 2015 →

Anna Tatishvili was the defending champion, but lost in the second round to Kateryna Bondarenko.

Bondarenko went on to win the tournament, defeating Grace Min in the final, 6–4, 7–5.

== Seeds ==
1. (Croatia) Mirjana Lučić-Baroni (first round)
2. (United States) Madison Brengle (quarterfinals)
3. (United States) Anna Tatishvili (second round)
4. (United States) Grace Min (final)
5. (Australia) Olivia Rogowska (first round)
6. (Portugal) Michelle Larcher de Brito (first round)
7. (Paraguay) Verónica Cepede Royg (first round)
8. (United States) Irina Falconi (semifinals)

== Main draw ==
=== Key ===
- Q = Qualifier
- WC = Wild card
- LL = Lucky loser
- Alt = Alternate
- ITF = ITF entry
- PR = Protected ranking
- SR = Special ranking
- SE = Special exempt
- JE = Junior exempt
- JR = Junior Accelerator Programme entrant
- CO = College Accelerator Programme entrant
- NG = Next Gen Accelerator Program entrant
- w/o = Walkover
- r = Retired
- d = Defaulted

=== Finals ===
Semifinals
(Croatia) Petra Martić	6	2	1
Q	(Ukraine) Kateryna Bondarenko	1	6	6
4	(United States) Grace Min	7	6
8	(United States) Irina Falconi	5	3

Final
Q	(Ukraine) Kateryna Bondarenko	6	7
4	(United States) Grace Min	4	5

=== Top half ===
First round
1	(Croatia) M Lučić-Baroni	6^{3}	4
(United States) A Muhammad	7^{7}	6
WC	(United States) E Halbauer	6	4	6
(Switzerland) C Perrin	4	6	3
(Japan) M Hibi	6^{0}	6	2
WC	(United States) K Stewart	7^{7}	2	6
(Croatia) P Martić	4	6	6
6	(Portugal) M Larcher de Brito	6	4	3
3	(United States) A Tatishvili	6	0	6
PR	(Romania) E Gallovits-Hall	3	6	2
(United States) S Vickery	3	5
Q	(Ukraine) K Bondarenko	6	7
(United States) J Boserup	7	6
(United States) S Crawford	5	2
(United States) L Chirico	6	6
5	(Australia) O Rogowska	2	4

Second round
(United States) A Muhammad	6	5	0
WC	(United States) E Halbauer	3	7	6
WC	(United States) K Stewart	6^{1}	2
(Croatia) P Martić	7^{7}	6
3	(United States) A Tatishvili	2	3
Q	(Ukraine) K Bondarenko	6	6
(United States) J Boserup	6	6
(United States) L Chirico	2	2

Quarterfinals
WC	(United States) E Halbauer	2	0
(Croatia) P Martić	6	6
Q	(Ukraine) K Bondarenko	6	6
(United States) J Boserup	2	0

Semifinals
(Croatia) P Martić	6	2	1
Q	(Ukraine) K Bondarenko	1	6	6

=== Bottom half ===
First round
7	(Paraguay) V Cepede Royg	2	3
(United States) S Marand	6	6
(United States) M Oudin	4	6	7^{9}
(Russia) M Melnikova	6	2	6^{7}
(United States) J Brady	4	5
Q	(Brazil) B Haddad Maia	6	7
WC	(United States) L Embree	2	5
4	(United States) G Min	6	7
8	(United States) I Falconi	6	6
(Brazil) G Cé	3	0
Q	(Italy) J Paolini	6	4	6
(South Africa) C Simmonds	4	6	0
(Japan) N Osaka	4	6	4
(Belarus) I Kremen	6	3	6
Q	(Slovenia) P Rampre	2	2
2	(United States) M Brengle	6	6

Second round
(United States) S Marand	6	6
(United States) M Oudin	4	3
(Brazil) B Haddad Maia	2	4
4	(United States) G Min	6	6
8	(United States) I Falconi	6	6
Q	(Italy) J Paolini	3	0
(Belarus) I Kremen	2	0
2	(United States) M Brengle	6	6

Quarterfinals
(United States) S Marand	2	2
4	(United States) G Min	6	6
8	(United States) I Falconi	6	7
2	(United States) M Brengle	2	5

Semifinals
4	(United States) G Min	7	6
8	(United States) I Falconi	5	3
