= Guimarães Ladies Open =

- 2024 Guimarães Ladies Open

ITF Women's Tour
- Event name: Guimarães Ladies Open
- Location: Guimarães, Portugal
- Venue: Clube de Ténis de Guimarães
- Category: ITF Women's World Tennis Tour
- Surface: Hard
- Draw: 32S/32Q/16D
- Prize money: $60,000

The Guimarães Ladies Open is a tournament for professional female tennis players played on outdoor hard courts. The event is classified as a $60,000 ITF Women's World Tennis Tour tournament and has been held in Guimarães, Portugal, since 2012.

== Past finals ==
=== Singles ===
Year	Champion	Runner-up	Score
2026	(United States) Savannah Broadus	Aliona Falei	1–6, 6–3, 6–4
2025	(Portugal) Francisca Jorge	(Portugal) Matilde Jorge	5–7, 6–2, 6–2
2024	(Portugal) Francisca Jorge	(United States) Liv Hovde	6–3, 6–4
2023	(Czech Republic) Gabriela Knutson	(United States) Madison Sieg	6–3, 6–4
2022	(Spain) Rosa Vicens Mas	(Australia) Alexandra Bozovic	6–4, 6–1
2019–21	Not held		
2018	(Portugal) Maria João Koehler	(India) Zeel Desai	6–1, 3–6, 6–1
2017	(Switzerland) Lara Michel	(Spain) Marta González Encinas	6–3, 6–1
2014–16	Not held		
2013	(France) Clothilde de Bernardi	(Mexico) Ximena Hermoso	6–0, 6–2
2012	(France) Léa Tholey	(France) Estelle Cascino	6–3, 6–1

=== Doubles ===
Year	Champions	Runners-up	Score
2026	(United States) Savannah Broadus (United States) Abigail Rencheli	(Slovakia) Viktória Hrunčáková (Slovakia) Katarína Kužmová	6–3, 6–4
2025	(India) Ankita Raina (France) Alice Robbe	(Japan) Hiromi Abe (Japan) Kanako Morisaki	1–6, 6–4, [10–8]
2024	(United States) Sophie Chang (United States) Rasheeda McAdoo	(Portugal) Francisca Jorge (Portugal) Matilde Jorge	7–6^{(8–6)}, 6–7^{(2–7)}, [10–5]
2023	(Spain) Georgina García Pérez (Australia) Petra Hule	(Portugal) Francisca Jorge (Portugal) Matilde Jorge	6–4, 7–5
2022	(Portugal) Francisca Jorge (Portugal) Matilde Jorge	(United Kingdom) Sarah Beth Grey (United States) Jamie Loeb	6–3, 6–1
2019–21	Not held		
2018	(Romania) Karola Bejenaru (Sweden) Jacqueline Cabaj Awad	(India) Zeel Desai (Romania) Cristina Ene	6–1, 6–0
2017	(Netherlands) Arianne Hartono (Japan) Yuriko Lily Miyazaki	(Italy) Maria Masini (Spain) Olga Parres Azcoitia	7–5, 6–0
2014–16	Not held		
2013	(Russia) Natela Dzalamidze (Spain) Arabela Fernández Rabener	(Switzerland) Tess Sugnaux (Portugal) Rita Vilaça	3–6, 6–3, [10–3]
2012	(Portugal) Margarida Moura (Portugal) Joana Valle Costa	(Germany) Stefanie Stemmer (Liechtenstein) Kathinka von Deichmann	7–5, 3–6, [10–7]
