= 2025 Credit One Charleston Open =

- Date: March 31–April 6
- Edition: 53rd
- Category: WTA 500
- Draw: 48S / 16D
- Surface: Green clay / outdoor
- Location: Charleston, SC, United States
- Venue: Family Circle Tennis Center

Champions

Singles
- (United States) Jessica Pegula

Doubles
- (Latvia) Jeļena Ostapenko / (New Zealand) Erin Routliffe
- Charleston Open

The 2025 Charleston Open (branded as the Credit One Charleston Open for sponsorship reasons) was a professional women's tennis tournament played on outdoor clay courts at the Family Circle Tennis Center on Daniel Island in Charleston, South Carolina. It was the 53rd edition of the tournament and a WTA 500 tournament on the 2025 WTA Tour. It took place from March 31 to April 6, 2025, and was the only event of the clay court season played on green clay.

== Champions ==
=== Singles ===
- (United States) Jessica Pegula def. (United States) Sofia Kenin 6–3, 7–5

=== Doubles ===
- (Latvia) Jeļena Ostapenko / (New Zealand) Erin Routliffe def. (United States) Caroline Dolehide / (United States) Desirae Krawczyk 6–4, 6–2

== Singles main draw entrants ==
=== Seeds ===
| Country | Player | Rank^{1} | Seed |
|---|---|---|---|
| USA | Jessica Pegula | 4 | 1 |
| USA | Madison Keys | 5 | 2 |
| CHN | Zheng Qinwen | 9 | 3 |
| USA | Emma Navarro | 10 | 4 |
| AUS | Daria Kasatkina | 12 | 5 |
| | Diana Shnaider | 13 | 6 |
| USA | Danielle Collins | 15 | 7 |
| USA | Amanda Anisimova | 17 | 8 |
| | Ekaterina Alexandrova | 20 | 9 |
| KAZ | Yulia Putintseva | 24 | 10 |
| LAT | Jeļena Ostapenko | 25 | 11 |
| ~~POL~~ | ~~Magdalena Fręch~~ | ~~27~~ | ~~12~~ |
| BEL | Elise Mertens | 28 | 13 |
| | Anna Kalinskaya | 33 | 14 |
| USA | Ashlyn Krueger | 40 | 15 |
| USA | Peyton Stearns | 43 | 16 |
| SUI | Belinda Bencic | 45 | 17 |

- ^{1} Rankings as of March 17, 2025.

=== Other entrants ===
The following players received wildcards into the main draw:

- (United States) Lauren Davis
- (United States) Maria Mateas
- (Canada) Marina Stakusic
- (United Kingdom) Heather Watson

The following players received entry from the qualifying draw:

- (United States) Louisa Chirico
- (United States) Jamie Loeb
- (United States) Caty McNally
- (Canada) Katherine Sebov
- Iryna Shymanovich
- (China) Zhang Shuai

The following player received entry as a lucky loser:

- (Japan) Kyōka Okamura

=== Withdrawals ===
- (Spain) Paula Badosa → replaced by Anna Blinkova
- (Italy) Lucia Bronzetti → replaced by Erika Andreeva
- (Poland) Magdalena Fręch → replaced by (Japan) Kyōka Okamura
- (Brazil) Beatriz Haddad Maia → replaced by (Australia) Olivia Gadecki
- (Poland) Magda Linette → replaced by (United Kingdom) Harriet Dart
- (Egypt) Mayar Sherif → replaced by (United States) Hailey Baptiste
- (New Zealand) Lulu Sun → replaced by (United States) Bernarda Pera
- (Mexico) Renata Zarazúa → replaced by (Australia) Ajla Tomljanović

== Doubles main draw entrants ==
=== Seeds ===
| Country | Player | Country | Player | Rank^{1} | Seed |
|---|---|---|---|---|---|
| LAT | Jeļena Ostapenko | NZL | Erin Routliffe | 8 | 1 |
| TPE | Chan Hao-ching | | Veronika Kudermetova | 25 | 2 |
| USA | Caroline Dolehide | USA | Desirae Krawczyk | 35 | 3 |
| USA | Sofia Kenin | UKR | Lyudmyla Kichenok | 36 | 4 |

- Rankings are as of March 17, 2025.

=== Other entrants ===
The following pair received a wildcard into the doubles main draw:

- (United States) Maria Mateas / (United States) Alana Smith

The following pair entered the draw using a protected ranking:

- (United States) Hailey Baptiste / (United States) Caty McNally
