= Eryn Cayetano =

American tennis player (born 2001)

- Country (sports): United States
- Born: April 13, 2001 (age 25) Long Beach, California, US
- Height: 1.57 m (5 ft 2 in)
- College: USC
- Prize money: $82,371

Singles
- Career record: 125–58
- Career titles: 7 ITF
- Highest ranking: No. 320 (June 15, 2026)
- Current ranking: No. 372 (August 31, 2026)

Doubles
- Career record: 83–40
- Career titles: 12 ITF
- Highest ranking: No. 154 (June 8, 2026)
- Current ranking: No. 181 (August 31, 2026)
- Last updated on: September 9, 2026.

Eryn Cayetano (born April 13, 2001) is an American professional tennis player. She has career-high WTA rankings of No. 320 in singles and No. 154 in doubles, both achieved in June 2026. She has won seven singles titles and 12 doubles titles on the ITF World Tour. Cayetano played collegiate tennis at the University of Southern California.

== Early life ==
Cayetano grew up in Long Beach and Corona, California. Her father, Ed, was born and raised in Cebu, Philippines. She attended St. Anthony High School.

== College ==
Cayetano played collegiate tennis for the USC Trojans. In 2022, she joined the USTA Collegiate Summer Team and was nominated for the Honda Sports Award.

== ITF Circuit finals ==
=== Singles: 8 (7 titles, 1 runner-up) ===
Legend
W35 tournaments (1–0)
W15 tournaments (6–1)

Result	W–L	Date	Tournament	Tier	Surface	Opponent	Score
Win	1–0	Jun 2022	ITF Los Angeles, United States	W15	Hard	(United States) Iva Jovic	5–7, 6–4, 6–3
Win	2–0	Jun 2022	ITF Cancún, Mexico	W15	Hard	(Mexico) Lya Isabel Fernández Olivares	6–2, 6–2
Loss	2–1	Sep 2024	ITF Monastir, Tunisia	W15	Hard	(Japan) Hiromi Abe	4–6, 6–1, 3–6
Win	3–1	Sep 2024	ITF Monastir, Tunisia	W15	Hard	Maria Golovina	7–5, 7–5
Win	4–1	Mar 2025	ITF Monastir, Tunisia	W15	Hard	(United States) Julia Adams	6–3, 6–3
Win	5–1	Jun 2025	ITF Rancho Santa Fe, US	W15	Hard	(United States) Alexis Nguyen	6–7^{(6)}, 6–2, 6–0
Win	6–1	Jun 2025	ITF Lakewood, US	W15	Hard	(United States) Anne Christine Lutkemeyer	6–3, 7–5
Win	7–1	May 2026	ITF Bethany Beach, US	W35	Hard	(United States) Madison Brengle	7–5, 6–1

=== Doubles: 18 (12 titles, 6 runner-ups) ===
Legend
W100 tournaments (1–2)
W75 tournaments (1–0)
W25/35 tournaments (4–1)
W15 tournaments (6–3)

Result	W–L	Date	Tournament	Tier	Surface	Partner	Opponents	Score
Win	1–0	Jun 2022	ITF Los Angeles, United States	W15	Hard	(United States) Salma Ewing	(Thailand) Bunyawi Thamchaiwat (Chinese Taipei) Yang Ya-yi	6–3, 4–6, [10–8]
Win	2–0	May 2023	ITF Rancho Santa Fe, US	W15	Hard	(United States) Isabella Chhiv	(United States) Megan McCray (United States) Brandy Walker	6–4, 6–3
Win	3–0	Jun 2023	ITF Colorado Springs, US	W25	Hard	(United States) Maribella Zamarripa	(United States) Lauren Friedman; Alina Shcherbinina	6–4, 6–2
Loss	3–1	Jun 2023	ITF Irvine, US	W15	Hard	(United States) Isabella Chhiv	(United States) Haley Giavara (United States) Katherine Hui	2–6, 4–6
Loss	3–2	Jun 2024	ITF San Diego,, US	W15	Hard	(Australia) Lily Fairclough	(United States) Carolyn Campana (Sweden) Lisa Zaar	7–6^{(3)}, 4–6, [9–11]
Win	4–2	Sep 2024	ITF Monastir, Tunisia	W15	Hard	(United States) Maribella Zamarripa	(Poland) Xenia Bandurowska (Kazakhstan) Sandugash Kenzhibayeva	6–4, 6–2
Win	5–2	Sep 2024	ITF Redding, US	W35	Hard	(United States) Ayana Akli	(United States) Clervie Ngounoue (Japan) Himeno Sakatsume	6–2, 6–2
Win	6–2	Oct 2024	ITF Bakersfield, US	W35	Hard	(United States) India Houghton	(Japan) Mana Ayukawa (China) Yujia Huang	7–6^{(8)}, 6–2
Loss	6–3	Mar 2025	ITF Monastir, Tunisia	W15	Hard	(United States) Salma Ewing	(Lithuania) Andrė Lukošiūtė (Germany) Luisa Meyer auf der Heide	5–7, 2–6
Win	7–3	Mar 2025	ITF Monastir, Tunisia	W15	Hard	(Czech Republic) Emma Slavíková	(United States) Julia Adams (United Kingdom) Esther Adeshina	7–5, 3–6, [10–4]
Win	8–3	Jun 2025	ITF Rancho Santa Fe, US	W15	Hard	(Australia) Lily Fairclough	(Canada) Scarlett Nicholson (Ukraine) Anita Sahdiieva	6–3, 7–5
Win	9–3	Jun 2025	ITF Lakewood, US	W15	Hard	(United States) Haley Giavara	(United States) Jordyn McBride (Armenia) Kristina Nordikyan	6–0, 6–1
Win	10–3	Jul 2025	Lexington Open, US	W75	Hard	(United States) Ayana Akli	(United States) Elvina Kalieva (United States) Alana Smith	4–6, 6–2, [10–4]
Win	11–3	Oct 2025	Macon Classic, US	W100	Hard	(United States) Ayana Akli	(United States) Rasheeda McAdoo (Kenya) Angella Okutoyi	6–7^{(4)}, 6–2, [16–14]
Loss	11–4	Oct 2025	Tyler Pro Challenge, US	W100	Hard	(United States) Victoria Hu	(Poland) Weronika Falkowska (United States) Dalayna Hewitt	2–6, 3–6
Win	12–4	Feb 2026	Arcadia Pro Open, US	W35	Hard	(United States) Haley Giavara	(United States) Jaeda Daniel (Ukraine) Anita Sahdiieva	6–1, 6–1
Loss	12–5	Apr 2026	Charlottesville Open, US	W100	Clay	(United States) Allura Zamarripa	(Spain) Alicia Herrero Liñana (United States) Anna Rogers	1–6, 3–6
Loss	12–6	May 2026	ITF Bethany Beach, US	W35	Clay	(United States) Haley Giavara	(United States) Savannah Broadus (United States) Kylie Collins	0–6, 5–7
