= Ayana Akli =

American tennis player (born 2001)

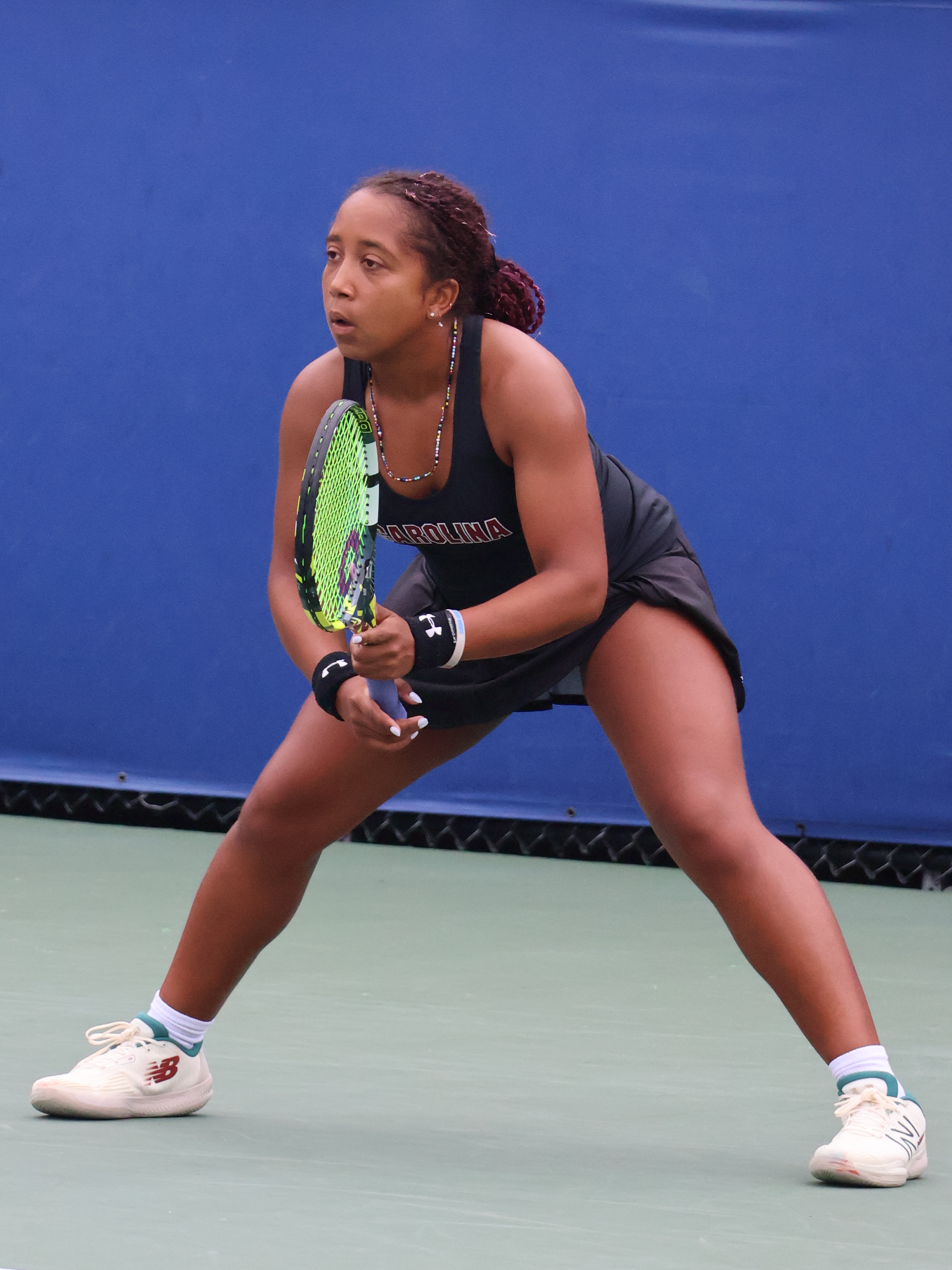
- Akli playing for the South Carolina Gamecocks in 2023
- Country (sports): United States
- Born: July 6, 2001 (age 25) Silver Spring, Maryland, US
- Height: 1.63 m (5 ft 4 in)
- Plays: Right (two-handed backhand)
- College: Maryland; South Carolina
- Prize money: $238,937

Singles
- Career record: 102–66
- Career titles: 2 ITF
- Highest ranking: No. 234 (April 20, 2026)
- Current ranking: No. 279 (September 28, 2026)

Grand Slam singles results
- French Open: Q1 (2026)
- US Open: Q3 (2025)

Doubles
- Career record: 66–44
- Career titles: 8 ITF
- Highest ranking: No. 127 (June 22, 2026)
- Current ranking: No. 159 (September 28, 2026)
- Last updated on: October 2, 2026.

Ayana Akli (born July 6, 2001) is an American professional tennis player. She has career-high rankings of No. 234 in singles, achieved on April 20, 2026, and world No. 127 in doubles, achieved on June 22, 2026. She played collegiate tennis at the University of Maryland and the University of South Carolina.

== Early life ==
Akli was born in Silver Spring, Maryland, to Komi and Linda Akli. Her father is a former professional tennis player who immigrated to the United States from Togo in 1996; he was the childhood coach of Frances Tiafoe. She began playing tennis at the age of four and trained at the Junior Tennis Champions Center in College Park. She attended Wheaton High School, where she was a three-time state champion in girls' singles. She later received a degree in civil engineering from the University of South Carolina.

== Career ==
In 2019, Akli signed a letter of intent to play collegiate tennis for the Maryland Terrapins. After two years, she transferred to the University of South Carolina. Playing for the South Carolina Gamecocks, she reached career-high national rankings of No. 3 in singles and No. 10 in doubles. She also received ITA All-American and All-SEC honors and was named the SEC Women's Tennis Scholar-Athlete of the Year.

In October 2023, she reached the semifinals of the Christus Health Pro Challenge as a qualifier. In July 2024, she reached the semifinals of the Championnats de Granby as a qualifier. Later that year, she won her first professional doubles title at the W35 USTA Pro Circuit event in Redding, partnering Eryn Cayetano.

== ITF Circuit finals ==
=== Singles: 5 (2 titles, 3 runner-ups) ===
Legend
W75 tournaments (0–1)
W35 tournaments (2–2)

Result	W–L	Date	Tournament	Tier	Surface	Opponent	Score
Loss	0–1	Apr 2025	ITF Charlotte, United States	W35	Clay	(Spain) Alicia Herrero Liñana	1–6, 6–7^{(1)}
Loss	0–2	May 2025	ITF Boca Raton, US	W35	Clay	(United States) Monika Ekstrand	2–6, 1–6
Win	1–2	May 2025	ITF Bethany Beach, US	W35	Clay	(Mexico) Ana Sofía Sánchez	6–2, 7–5
Win	2–2	Jun 2026	Georgia's Rome Open, US	W35	Clay	(United States) Amelia Honer	7–6^{(3)}, 6–4
Loss	2–3	Aug 2026	Lexington Open, US	W75	Hard	(Finland) Anastasia Kulikova	5–7, 4–6

=== Doubles: 15 (8 titles, 7 runner-ups) ===
Legend
W100 tournaments (2–1)
W75 tournaments (3–2)
W50 tournaments (1–1)
W25/35 tournaments (2–2)
W15 tournaments (0–1)

Result	W–L	Date	Tournament	Tier	Surface	Partner	Opponents	Score
Loss	0–1	Oct 2023	ITF Florence, US	W25	Hard	(Israel) Nicole Khirin	(United States) Abigail Rencheli (United States) Alana Smith	6–3, 6–7^{(9)}, [6–10]
Win	1–1	Sep 2024	ITF Redding, US	W35	Hard	(United States) Eryn Cayetano	(United States) Clervie Ngounoue (Japan) Himeno Sakatsume	6–2, 6–2
Loss	1–2	Jan 2025	ITF Palm Coast, US	W35	Clay	(United States) Abigail Rencheli	(Netherlands) Jasmijn Gimbrère (Sweden) Lisa Zaar	4–6, 6–3, [8–10]
Loss	1–3	Mar 2025	ITF Hagetmau, France	W15	Hard	(United States) Mia Horvit	(France) Sarah Iliev (France) Emma Léné	6–7^{(2)}, 6–3, [8–10]
Loss	1–4	Mar 2025	ITF Santo Domingo, Dominican Republic	W50	Hard	(United States) Clervie Ngounoue	(Russia) Anastasia Tikhonova (Russia) Mariia Tkacheva	6–7^{(5)}, 7–6^{(2)}, [7–10]
Win	2–4	Apr 2025	ITF Boca Raton, US	W35	Clay	(Morocco) Diae El Jardi	(Greece) Despina Papamichail (Bulgaria) Gergana Topalova	7–6^{(1)}, 7–5
Win	3–4	Jun 2025	Cary Tennis Classic, United States	W100	Hard	(United States) Abigail Rencheli	(South Africa) Gabriella Broadfoot (United States) Maddy Zampardo	6–3, 6–2
Loss	3–5	Jul 2025	Evansville Classic, US	W100	Hard	(United States) Victoria Osuigwe	(Netherlands) Arianne Hartono (India) Prarthana Thombare	3–6, 3–6
Win	4–5	Jul 2025	Lexington Open, US	W75	Hard	(United States) Eryn Cayetano	(United States) Elvina Kalieva (United States) Alana Smith	4–6, 6–2, [10–4]
Win	5–5	Oct 2025	Tennis Classic of Macon, United States	W100	Hard	(United States) Eryn Cayetano	(United States) Rasheeda McAdoo (Kenya) Angella Okutoyi	6–7^{(4)}, 6–2, [16–14]
Loss	5–6	May 2026	Zaragoza Open, Spain	W75	Clay	(Belgium) Lara Salden	(Spain) Yvonne Cavallé Reimers (Spain) Ángela Fita Boluda	4–6, 4–6
Win	6–6	Jul 2026	ITF Columbus, United States	W50	Hard (i)	(Morocco) Diae El Jardi	(United States) Ava Hrastar (United States) Victoria Mulville	6–3, 1–6, [10–7]
Win	7–6	Jul 2026	Lexington Open, US	W75	Hard	(United States) Fiona Crawley	(United States) Savannah Broadus (United States) Kylie Collins	2–6, 7–6^{(3)}, [12–10]
Win	8–6	Sep 2026	The Campus Open, Portugal	W75	Hard	(United States) Reese Brantmeier	(United States) Kylie Collins (United States) Carson Tanguilig	7–5, 6–4
Loss	8–7	Oct 2026	Tevlin Women's Challenger, Canada	W75	Hard (i)	(United States) Madison Sieg	(Canada) Ariana Arseneault (Canada) Raphaëlle Lacasse	1–6, 6–7^{(3)}
