= Iveta Dapkutė =

Lithuanian tennis player (born 1993)

- Country (sports): Lithuania
- Born: 29 January 1993 (age 33)
- Plays: Right-handed (two-handed backhand)
- Prize money: $31,179

Singles
- Career record: 115–104
- Highest ranking: No. 728 (21 October 2024)
- Current ranking: No. 765 (25 May 2026)

Doubles
- Career record: 41–47
- Career titles: 2 ITF
- Highest ranking: No. 507 (20 October 2025)
- Current ranking: No. 585 (22 September 2025)

Team competitions
- Fed Cup: 2–0
- Last updated on: 8 September 2025.

Iveta Dapkutė (born 29 January 1993) is a Lithuanian professional tennis player.

Dapkutė has career-high WTA rankings of 728 in singles and 585 in doubles.

She has represented Lithuania in the Billie Jean King Cup, making her debut in 2021.

== ITF Circuit finals ==
=== Singles: 1 (runner–up) ===
Legend W15 tournaments	Finals by surface Hard (0–1)

Result	W–L	Date	Tournament	Tier	Surface	Opponent	Score
Loss	0–1	Sep 2025	ITF Heraklion, Greece	W15	Hard	(Australia) Stefani Webb	0–6, 3–6

=== Doubles: 5 (3 titles, 2 runner–ups) ===
Legend W40/50 tournaments W15 tournaments	Finals by surface Hard (3–2)

Result	W–L	Date	Tournament	Tier	Surface	Partner	Opponents	Score
Loss	0–1	Oct 2019	ITF Oslo, Norway	W15	Hard (i)	(Slovakia) Ingrid Vojčináková	(Russia) Ekaterina Kazionova (United Kingdom) Anna Popescu	6–3, 5–7, [5–10]
Win	1–1	Dec 2022	ITF Lousada, Portugal	W15	Hard (i)	(Sweden) Julita Saner	(Chinese Taipei) Lee Pei-chi (Italy) Maria Vittoria Viviani	6–3, 4–6, [10–7]
Loss	1–2	Jun 2025	ITF Montemor-o-Novo, Portugal	W50	Hard	(Poland) Weronika Ewald	Aliona Falei; Polina Iatcenko	3–6, 5–7
Win	2–2	Sep 2025	ITF Heraklion, Greece	W15	Hard	(Greece) Marianne Argyrokastriti	(Israel) Shira Buhadana (Czech Republic) Nikola Kopřivová	6–1, 6–4
Win	3–2	Sep 2025	ITF Heraklion, Greece	W15	Hard	(Greece) Marianne Argyrokastriti	(Germany) Laura Boehner (Germany) Angelina Wirges	2–6, 7–6^{(4)}, [12–10]
