= Jana Kolodynska =

Belarusian tennis player

- Country (sports): Belarus
- Born: 10 August 2003 (age 23)
- Height: 182 cm (6 ft 0 in)
- Plays: Right-handed
- Prize money: $115,023

Singles
- Career record: 123-99
- Career titles: 4 ITF
- Highest ranking: No. 212 (2 October 2023)
- Current ranking: No. 732 (12 October 2026)

Grand Slam singles results
- Australian Open: Q1 (2024)

Doubles
- Career record: 14–12
- Career titles: 1 ITF
- Highest ranking: No. 441 (14 October 2024)
- Last updated on: 18 October 2026.

Jana Jarasłavaŭna Kolodynska (Belarusian: Яна Яраславаўна Каладынска born 10 August 2003) is a professional tennis player from Belarus.

She has achieved career-high WTA rankings of No. 212 in singles (as of 2 October 2023) and No. 441 in doubles (as of 14 October 2024).

== Career ==
Kolodynska began competing on the ITF Women's Circuit in her teens, quickly establishing herself as a promising player in both singles and doubles. Known for her aggressive baseline game and mental resilience, she has recorded several notable wins, particularly on hard courts.

Kolodynska won her first 80k title at the ITF tournament in Macon, Georgia in doubles. In singles, Kolodynska has reached eight ITF Circuit finals, winning three of them across different levels, including W15 and W40 events. Her first professional title (W15) came in Monastir, Tunisia in March 2021, where she defeated Lucrezia Stefanini in a tightly contested three-set match.

In doubles, her breakthrough came in October 2023, when she partnered Tatiana Prozorova to win the W80 Classic of Macon, Georgia marking the biggest title of her career to date.

== ITF Circuit finals ==
=== Singles: 8 (3 titles, 5 runner-ups) ===
Legend W60 tournaments W40 tournaments W25 tournaments W15 tournaments	Finals by surface Hard (3–3) Clay (0–2)

Result	W–L	Date	Tournament	Tier	Surface	Opponent	Score
Win	1–0	Mar 2021	ITF Monastir, Tunisia	W15	Hard	(Italy) Lucrezia Stefanini	1–6, 6–0, 7–6^{(7–5)}
Loss	1–1	Apr 2022	ITF Piracicaba, Brazil	W15	Clay	(Slovakia) Bianca Behúlová	6–2, 1–6, 4–6
Win	2–1	Jun 2022	ITF Santo Domingo, Dominican Republic	W25	Hard	(United States) Victoria Duval	6–0, ret.
Loss	2–2	Jun 2022	ITF Santo Domingo, Dominican Republic	W25	Hard	(United States) Hurricane Tyra Black	3–6, 3–6
Loss	2–3	Feb 2023	ITF Mexico City	W40	Hard	(Latvia) Darja Semeņistaja	5–7, 0–4 ret.
Win	3–3	Jun 2023	ITF La Marsa, Tunisia	W40	Hard	(Lithuania) Justina Mikulskytė	6–2, 2–0 ret.
Loss	3–4	Aug 2023	ITF Feira de Santana, Brazil	W60	Hard	(Brazil) Laura Pigossi	1–6, 4–6
Loss	3–5	Aug 2023	ITF Arequipa, Peru	W40	Clay	(Italy) Miriana Tona	2–6, 6–3, 6–4

=== Doubles: 1 (title) ===
Legend W80 tournaments	Finals by surface Hard (1–0)

Result	Date	Tournament	Tier	Surface	Partner	Opponents	Score
Win	Oct 2023	Tennis Classic of Macon, United States	W80	Hard	(Russia) Tatiana Prozorova	(United States) Sofia Sewing (Russia) Anastasia Tikhonova	6–3, 6–2
