= Anna Rogers =

American tennis player (born 1998)

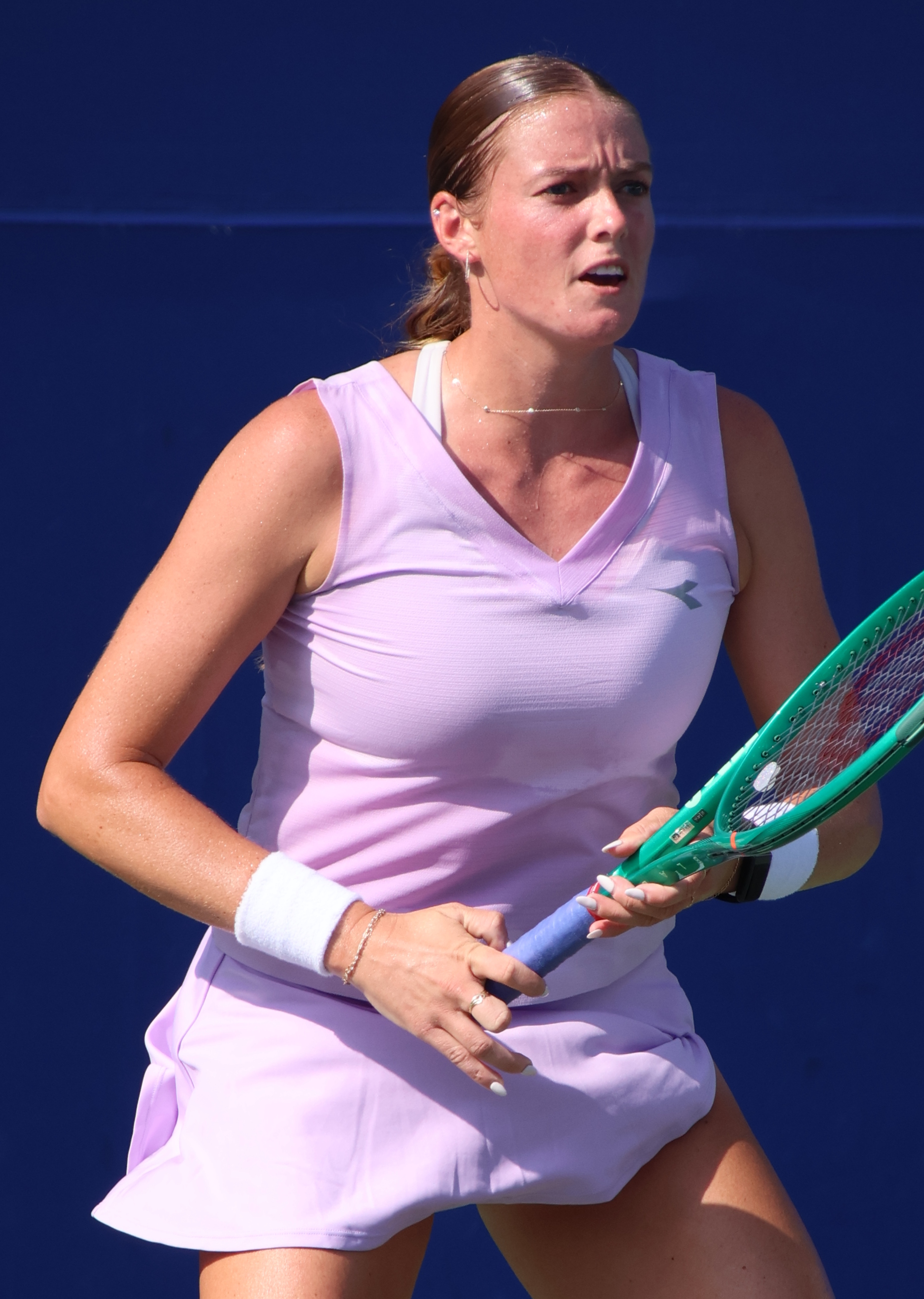
- Rogers in 2026
- Full name: Anna Sinclair Rogers
- Country (sports): United States
- Born: 21 March 1998 (age 28) Stamford, Connecticut
- Plays: Right-handed
- College: NC State
- Prize money: $228,408

Singles
- Career record: 159–139
- Career titles: 3 ITF
- Highest ranking: No. 230 (October 27, 2025)
- Current ranking: No. 438 (November 9, 2026)

Doubles
- Career record: 228–128
- Career titles: 2 WTA 125, 24 ITF
- Highest ranking: No. 82 (November 9, 2026)
- Current ranking: No. 82 (November 9, 2026)

Grand Slam doubles results
- US Open: 1R (2024)
- Last updated on: November 9, 2026.

Anna Sinclair Rogers (born 21 March 1998) is an American tennis player. She has a career-high doubles ranking by the WTA of 82, achieved on November 9, 2026. On October 27, 2025, she peaked at No. 230 in the singles rankings. Rogers has won two WTA 125 titles in doubles as well as three singles and 24 doubles titles on the ITF World Tennis Tour.

== College ==
Rogers played college tennis at the North Carolina State University (NC State).

== Professional career ==
=== 2022–2025: ITF success ===
Rogers won her first W60 title at the 2022 Caldas da Rainha Ladies Open, in the doubles draw, partnering Adriana Reami.

She made her WTA 1000 debut in doubles at the 2023 Guadalajara Open, partnering Olivia Tjandramulia as an alternate pair.

=== 2026: First WTA Tour final ===
In September, Rogers teamed up with Rasheeda McAdoo, to win her maiden WTA 125 title in doubles at the Barranquilla Open, defeating Dalayna Hewitt and Alana Smith in the final. The following week at the SP Open, she reached her first WTA Tour final, also in doubles, partnering Allura Zamarripa in a losing effort against top seeds Gabriela Dabrowski and Luisa Stefani.

Alongside Zamarripa, she won her second WTA 125 doubles title at the Cali Open in November, defeating María Lourdes Carlé and Laura Pigossi in the final.

== WTA Tour finals ==
=== Doubles: 1 (runner-up) ===
Legend WTA 250 (0–1)	Finals by surface Hard (0–1)

Result	Date	Tournament	Tier	Surface	Partner	Opponents	Score
Loss	Sep 2026	SP Open, Brazil	WTA 250	Hard	(United States) Allura Zamarripa	(Canada) Gabriela Dabrowski (Brazil) Luisa Stefani	3–6, 6–3, [7–10]

== WTA 125 finals ==
=== Doubles: 3 (2 titles, 1 runner-up) ===
Result	W–L	Date	Tournament	Surface	Partner	Opponents	Score
Loss	0–1	Jul 2026	Vancouver Open, Canada	Hard	(United States) Allura Zamarripa	(United States) Caroline Dolehide (Canada) Alexandra Vagramov	1–6, 6–3, [6–10]
Win	1–1	Sep 2026	Barranquilla Open, Colombia	Hard	(United States) Rasheeda McAdoo	(United States) Dalayna Hewitt (United States) Alana Smith	7–6^{(7–3)}, 6–3
Win	2–1	Nov 2026	Cali Open, Colombia	Clay	(United States) Allura Zamarripa	(Argentina) María Lourdes Carlé (Brazil) Laura Pigossi	7–6^{(7–5)}, 7–5

== ITF Circuit finals ==
=== Singles: 5 (3 titles, 2 runner-ups) ===
Legend
W100 tournaments (0–1)
W75 tournaments (0–1)
W35 tournaments (2–0)
W15 tournaments (1–0)

Result	W–L	Date	Tournament	Tier	Surface	Opponent	Score
Win	1–0	Sep 2021	ITF Cancún, Mexico	W15	Hard	(United States) Christina Rosca	6–0, 7–6
Loss	1–1	Oct 2024	Calgary Challenger, Canada	W75	Hard (i)	(Canada) Rebecca Marino	5–7, 4–6
Win	2–1	Nov 2024	ITF Norman, United States	W35	Hard (i)	Kira Matushkina	6–4, 6–3
Win	3–1	Feb 2025	ITF Herrenschwanden, Switzerland	W35	Carpet (i)	(Georgia (country)) Mariam Bolkvadze	6–3, 3–6, 6–3
Loss	3–2	Oct 2025	Tennis Classic of Macon, United States	W100	Hard	(Mexico) Renata Zarazúa	2–6, 1–6

=== Doubles: 40 (24 titles, 16 runner-ups) ===
Legend
W100 tournaments (2–3)
W80 tournaments (0–1)
W60/75 tournaments (5–5)
W50 tournaments (6–3)
W25/35 tournaments (8–4)
W15 tournaments (3–0)

Result	W–L	Date	Tournament	Tier	Surface	Partner	Opponents	Score
Win	1–0	Jul 2019	ITF Cancún, Mexico	W15	Hard	(United States) Adriana Reami	(France) Tiphanie Fiquet (Lithuania) Justina Mikulskytė	7–6^{(1)}, 6–4
Win	2–0	Oct 2021	ITF Cancún, Mexico	W15	Hard	(United States) Christina Rosca	(United States) Dasha Ivanova (United States) Lauren Proctor	6–2, 6–2
Win	3–0	Oct 2021	ITF Cancún, Mexico	W15	Hard	(United States) Christina Rosca	(Canada) Louise Kwong (United States) Anna Ulyashchenko	6–3, 6–1
Win	4–0	Nov 2021	ITF Orlando, US	W25	Clay	(United States) Christina Rosca	(France) Marine Partaud (Mexico) María Portillo Ramírez	6–3, 6–1
Loss	4–1	Jan 2022	ITF Vero Beach, US	W25	Clay	(United States) Christina Rosca	(United States) Sophie Chang (United States) Allie Kiick	3–6, 3–6
Win	5–1	Feb 2022	ITF Cancún, Mexico	W25	Hard	(United States) Christina Rosca	(Russia) Maria Bondarenko (Latvia) Darja Semeņistaja	6–1, 6–4
Win	6–1	Feb 2022	ITF Santo Domingo, Dominican Republic	W25	Hard	(United States) Christina Rosca	(Netherlands) Jasmijn Gimbrère (Netherlands) Isabelle Haverlag	6–2, 6–2
Finalist (Note: Singles and doubles competition were abandoned due to ongoing poor weather)	–	Apr 2022	ITF Pretoria, South Africa	W25	Hard	(United States) Christina Rosca	(Hong Kong) Eudice Chong (Hong Kong) Cody Wong	not played
Win	7–1	May 2022	ITF Naples, US	W25	Clay	(United States) Christina Rosca	(United States) Rasheeda McAdoo (Mexico) Ana Sofía Sánchez	6–1, 6–4
Win	8–1	Sep 2022	Caldas da Rainha Open, Portugal	W60	Clay	(United States) Adriana Reami	(Australia) Elysia Bolton (United States) Jamie Loeb	6–4, 7–5
Win	9–1	Oct 2022	Tennis Classic of Macon, US	W60	Hard	(United States) Christina Rosca	(United States) Madison Brengle (United States) Maria Mateas	6–4, 6–4
Loss	9–2	Dec 2022	Aberto da República, Brazil	W60	Clay	(United States) Christina Rosca	(Brazil) Ingrid Martins (Portugal) Francisca Jorge	4–6, 3–6
Win	10–2	Jun 2023	ITF Sumter, US	W60	Hard	(United States) Maria Mateas	(United States) McCartney Kessler (Ukraine) Yuliia Starodubtseva	6–4, 6–7^{(3)}, [10–6]
Loss	10–3	Oct 2023	Tyler Pro Challenge, US	W80	Hard	(United States) Alana Smith	(United Kingdom) Amelia Rajecki (United States) Abigail Rencheli	5–7, 6–4, [14–16]
Win	11–3	Mar 2024	Trnava Indoor, Slovakia	W75	Hard (i)	(Netherlands) Isabelle Haverlag	(Chinese Taipei) Liang En-shuo (China) Tang Qianhui	6–3, 4–6, [12–10]
Win	12–3	Mar 2024	ITF Murska Sobota, Slovenia	W50	Hard (i)	(Portugal) Francisca Jorge	(Uzbekistan) Nigina Abduraimova (Czech Republic) Jesika Malečková	6–4, 5–7, [10–8]
Loss	12–4	May 2024	Zephyrhills Open, US	W75	Clay	(United States) Alana Smith	(Lithuania) Justina Mikulskytė (United States) Christina Rosca	4–6, 4–6
Win	13–4	Jul 2024	ITF Getxo, Spain	W35	Clay (i)	(United States) Alana Smith	(Greece) Martha Matoula (Australia) Seone Mendez	6–0, 7–6^{(7)}
Win	14–4	Jul 2024	ITF Corroios, Portugal	W50	Hard	(Poland) Martyna Kubka	(Portugal) Matilde Jorge (Australia) Elena Micic	6–1, 6–4
Loss	14–5	Jul 2024	Porto Open, Portugal	W75	Hard	(Ukraine) Kateryna Volodko	(Netherlands) Arianne Hartono (India) Prarthana Thombare	3–6, 4–6
Loss	14–6	Jul 2024	Open Castilla y León, Spain	W35	Hard	(Australia) Alexandra Osborne	(Bulgaria) Lia Karatancheva (Slovakia) Radka Zelníčková	6–2, 3–6, [3–10]
Loss	14–7	Aug 2024	ITF Ourense, Spain	W50	Hard	(Portugal) Matilde Jorge	(Poland) Martyna Kubka (Belgium) Lara Salden	6–3, 3–6, [8–10]
Loss	14–8	Oct 2024	ITF Edmonton, Canada	W35	Hard (i)	(United States) Jessica Failla	(Canada) Kayla Cross (United States) Maribella Zamarripa	3–6, 1–6
Win	15–8	Oct 2024	Challenger de Saguenay, Canada	W75+H	Hard (i)	(United States) Dalayna Hewitt	(Belgium) Magali Kempen (Belgium) Lara Salden	6–1, 7–5
Win	16–8	Nov 2024	ITF Miami, United States	W35	Hard	(Canada) Kayla Cross	(Morocco) Aya El Aouni (Poland) Olivia Lincer	7–5, 6–4
Win	17–8	Nov 2024	ITF Boca Raton, US	W50	Hard	(Spain) Alicia Herrero Liñana	Maria Kononova; Maria Kozyreva	6–2, 6–1
Win	18–8	Jan 2025	ITF Sunderland, United Kingdom	W35	Hard (i)	(United Kingdom) Amelia Rajecki	(South Korea) Park So-hyun (Hong Kong) Cody Wong	2–6, 6–3, [10–8]
Win	19–8	Feb 2025	ITF Manchester, UK	W35	Hard (i)	(Canada) Ariana Arseneault	(Poland) Weronika Falkowska (Poland) Martyna Kubka	6–7^{(5)}, 6–1, [10–8]
Loss	19–9	May 2025	ITF Pelham, US	W50	Clay	(Spain) Alicia Herrero Liñana	(United Kingdom) Madeleine Brooks (Australia) Petra Hule	4–6, 6–7^{(4)}
Loss	19–10	Oct 2025	Challenger de Saguenay, Canada	W75	Hard (i)	(Netherlands) Jasmijn Gimbrère	(Canada) Ariana Arseneault (Canada) Raphaëlle Lacasse	7–5, 3–6, [5–10]
Win	20–10	Nov 2025	ITF Chihuahua, Mexico	W50	Hard	(United States) Dalayna Hewitt	(Canada) Ariana Arseneault (Canada) Raphaëlle Lacasse	6–3, 6–0
Win	21–10	Nov 2025	Internazionali Val Gardena, Italy	W50	Hard (i)	(Canada) Kayla Cross	(Italy) Samira de Stefano (Italy) Gaia Maduzzi	7–6^{(4)}, 7–6^{(7)}
Loss	21–11	Jan 2026	ITF Buenos Aires, Argentina	W50	Clay	(Mexico) María Fernanda Navarro Oliva	(Argentina) Luciana Moyano (Ecuador) Camila Romero	6–1, 6–7^{(4)}, [10–12]
Loss	21–12	Jan 2026	Vero Beach Open, US	W75	Clay	(Argentina) Jazmín Ortenzi	(United States) Allura Zamarripa (United States) Maribella Zamarripa	W/O
Loss	21–13	Apr 2026	ITF Boca Raton, US	W35	Clay	(Venezuela) Sofía Elena Cabezas Domínguez	(United States) Savannah Broadus (United States) Abigail Rencheli	4–6, 6–3, [3–10]
Win	22–13	Apr 2026	Charlottesville Open, US	W100	Clay	(Spain) Alicia Herrero Liñana	(United States) Eryn Cayetano (United States) Allura Zamarripa	6–1, 6–3
Loss	22–14	Apr 2026	Bonita Springs Championship, US	W100	Clay	(Bulgaria) Lia Karatancheva	(Ecuador) Mell Reasco (Czech Republic) Darja Vidmanova	5–7, 3–6
Win	23–14	May 2026	ITF Indian Harbour Beach, US	W100	Clay	(United States) Allura Zamarripa	(Estonia) Ingrid Neel (United States) Abigail Rencheli	6–3, 6–0
Win	24–14	May 2026	Pelham Pro Classic, US	W50	Clay	(Spain) Alicia Herrero Liñana	(United States) Kaitlyn Carnicella (United States) Capucine Jauffret	6–2, 6–1
Loss	24–15	Jun 2026	Palmetto Pro Open, US	W100	Hard	(United States) Allura Zamarripa	(United States) Catherine Harrison (Australia) Alexandra Osborne	4–6, 6–4, [7–10]
Loss	24–16	Jul 2026	Evansville Classic, US	W100	Hard	(Canada) Kayla Cross	(Chinese Taipei) Cho I-hsuan (Chinese Taipei) Cho Yi-tsen	2–6, 3–6
