= Rasheeda McAdoo =

American tennis player (born 1995)

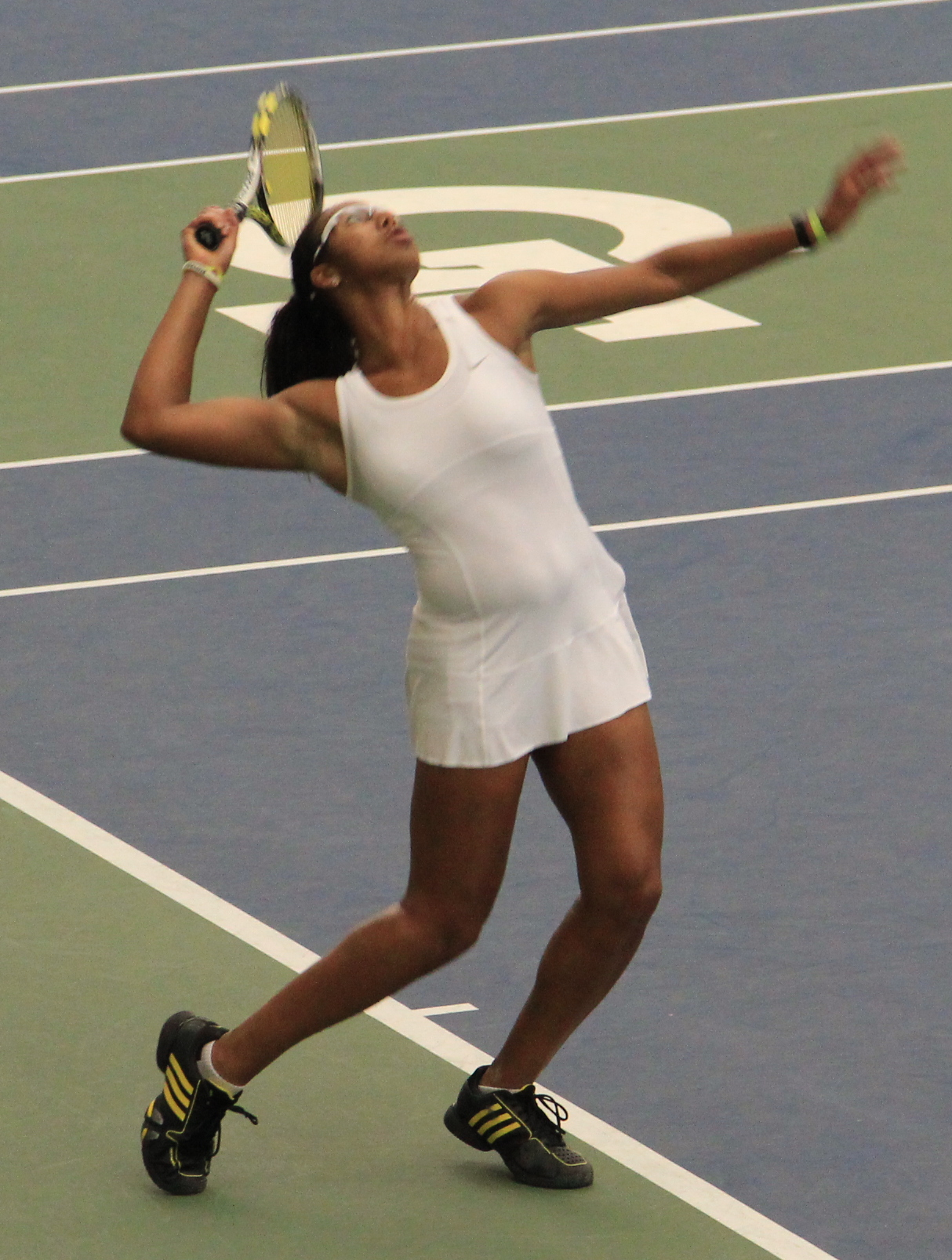
- McAdoo in 2014
- Full name: Rasheeda Alexis McAdoo
- Country (sports): United States
- Residence: Boca Raton, Florida
- Born: June 30, 1995 (age 31) Miami, Florida
- Height: 1.80 m (5 ft 11 in)
- Plays: Right (two-handed backhand)
- College: Georgia Tech
- Prize money: $139,624

Singles
- Career record: 219–194
- Career titles: 0
- Highest ranking: No. 443 (September 14, 2026)
- Current ranking: No. 524 (November 9, 2026)

Grand Slam singles results
- US Open Junior: 1R (2012)

Doubles
- Career record: 231–172
- Career titles: 1 WTA 125, 18 ITF
- Highest ranking: No. 108 (September 14, 2026)
- Current ranking: No. 123 (November 9, 2026)

Grand Slam doubles results
- US Open Junior: 1R (2012)
- Last updated on: November 9, 2026.

Rasheeda Alexis McAdoo (born June 30, 1995) is an American tennis player. She has career-high rankings of world No. 443 in singles and No. 198 in doubles, both achieved on September 14, 2026. She played collegiate tennis at Georgia Tech.

== Early life ==
McAdoo was born in Miami to Patrizia and Bob McAdoo. Her father is a two-time NBA champion and Hall of Famer who met her mother while playing in Italy. Her brother, Ryan, played basketball for the North Carolina Tar Heels. She attended American Heritage School in Delray Beach, Florida. She and her family moved to Boca Raton, Florida so she could train at the Evert Tennis Academy.

== Career ==
McAdoo played collegiate tennis for the Georgia Tech Yellow Jackets.

In September 2021, she and Ivana Popovic reached the doubles final of the W25 tournament in Fort Worth, but lost to Sophie Chang and Amy Zhu. The following month, she and Chanelle Van Nguyen were runners-up in doubles at the W25 H-E-B Women's Pro Tennis Open in Austin, losing to Elysia Bolton and Maegan Manasse in the final.

In early 2023, she and Jada Hart won two W25 doubles titles in Orlando and Santo Domingo. That July, she and Alexandra Osborne won the doubles title at the W25 Open Castilla y León. In June 2024, she and Sophie Chang won the title at the W75 Guimarães Ladies Open, defeating sisters Francisca and Matilde Jorge in the final. Later that year, she and Chang also won the doubles competition at the W75 Central Coast Open in Templeton.

In March 2025, she made her WTA Tour main-draw debut in the doubles tournament of the Charleston Open with Sophie Chang, but lost in the first round to Bethanie Mattek-Sands and Lucie Šafářová.

In September 2026, McAdoo teamed up with Anna Rogers, to win her maiden WTA 125 title in doubles at the Barranquilla Open, defeating Dalayna Hewitt and Alana Smith in the final.

== WTA 125 finals ==
=== Doubles: 2 (1 title, 1 runner-up) ===
| Result | W–L | Date | Tournament | Surface | Partner | Opponents | Score |
|---|---|---|---|---|---|---|---|
| Loss | 0–1 | Jul 2026 | Palermo Ladies Open, Italy | Clay | (Hungary) Adrienn Nagy | Anastasia Tikhonova (Slovenia) Tamara Zidanšek | 4–6, 4–6 |
| Win | 1–1 | Sep 2026 | Barranquilla Open, Colombia | Hard | (United States) Anna Rogers | (United States) Dalayna Hewitt (United States) Alana Smith | 7–6^{(7–3)}, 6–3 |

== ITF Circuit finals ==
=== Singles: 1 (runner-up) ===
| Legend W75 tournaments (0–0) W50 tournaments (0–1) W25 tournaments (0–0) | Finals by surface Hard (0–0) Clay (0–1) |

| Result | W–L | Date | Tournament | Tier | Surface | Opponent | Score |
|---|---|---|---|---|---|---|---|
| Loss | 0–1 | Aug 2026 | Hamburg Ladies Cup, Germany | W50 | Clay | (Czech Republic) Anna Sisková | 6–7^{(6)}, 6–1, 3–6 |

=== Doubles: 43 (18 titles, 25 runner-ups) ===
| Legend W100 tournaments (1–1) W60/75 tournaments (3–6) W50 tournaments (3–2) W25/35 tournaments (9–14) W15 tournaments (2–2) | Finals by surface Hard (11–10) Clay (7–14) Carpet (0–1) |

| Result | W–L | Date | Location | Tier | Surface | Partner | Opponents | Score |
|---|---|---|---|---|---|---|---|---|
| Win | 1–0 | Jan 2018 | ITF Fort-de-France, France (Martinique) | W15 | Hard | (United States) Amy Zhu | (United Kingdom) Emily Appleton (United States) Caty McNally | 7–5, 7–6^{(5)} |
| Loss | 1–1 | Mar 2018 | ITF Tampa, United States | W15 | Clay | (United States) Katerina Stewart | (United States) Caty McNally (United States) Natasha Subhash | 6–3, 3–6, [6–10] |
| Loss | 1–2 | May 2018 | ITF Naples, United States | W25 | Clay | (United States) Katerina Stewart | (Kazakhstan) Anna Danilina (Australia) Genevieve Lorbergs | 3–6, 6–1, [9–11] |
| Win | 2–2 | Mar 2019 | ITF Carson, United States | W15 | Hard | (United States) Natasha Subhash | (United States) Nicole Mossmer (United States) Chanelle Van Nguyen | 6–2, 6–4 |
| Loss | 2–3 | Mar 2019 | ITF Cancún, Mexico | W15 | Hard | (New Zealand) Paige Hourigan | (France) Lou Brouleau (Switzerland) Tess Sugnaux | 4–6, 3–6 |
| Loss | 2–4 | Jun 2019 | ITF Tarvisio, Italy | W25 | Clay | (Italy) Gloria Ceschi | (Brazil) Gabriela Cé (Brazil) Paula Cristina Gonçalves | 2–6, 6–4, [3–10] |
| Loss | 2–5 | Jul 2019 | ITF Imola, Italy | W25 | Carpet | (Egypt) Sandra Samir | (Brazil) Paula Cristina Gonçalves (Switzerland) Nina Stadler | 4–6, 2–6 |
| Win | 3–5 | Nov 2020 | ITF Orlando, US | W25 | Hard | (United States) Alycia Parks | (United States) Jamie Loeb (New Zealand) Erin Routliffe | 4–6, 6–1, [11–9] |
| Win | 4–5 | May 2021 | ITF Salinas, Ecuador | W25 | Hard | (Switzerland) Conny Perrin | (Mexico) Victoria Rodríguez (Mexico) Ana Sofía Sánchez | 6–4, 7–6^{(5)} |
| Loss | 4–6 | Jun 2021 | ITF Charleston Pro, US | W60 | Clay | (United States) Peyton Stearns | (Hungary) Fanny Stollár (Indonesia) Aldila Sutjiadi | 0–6, 4–6 |
| Loss | 4–7 | Sep 2021 | Open Medellín, Colombia | W25 | Clay | (Mexico) Victoria Rodríguez | (Colombia) María Herazo González (Brazil) Laura Pigossi | 2–6, 5–7 |
| Loss | 4–8 | Sep 2021 | ITF Fort Worth, US | W25 | Hard | (Australia) Ivana Popovic | (United States) Sophie Chang (United States) Amy Zhu | 6–4, 3–6, [8–10] |
| Loss | 4–9 | Oct 2021 | ITF Austin, US | W25 | Hard | (United States) Chanelle Van Nguyen | (Australia) Elysia Bolton (United States) Maegan Manasse | 1–6, 5–7 |
| Loss | 4–10 | May 2022 | ITF Naples, US | W25 | Clay | (Mexico) Ana Sofía Sánchez | (United States) Anna Rogers (United States) Christina Rosca | 1–6, 4–6 |
| Win | 5–10 | Oct 2022 | ITF Redding, US | W25 | Hard | (Ukraine) Hanna Poznikhirenko | (United States) Alexa Glatch (Indonesia) Aldila Sutjiadi | 7–6^{(3)}, 7–5 |
| Win | 6–10 | Jan 2023 | ITF Orlando, US | W25 | Hard | (United States) Jada Hart | (Japan) Haruna Arakawa (Japan) Natsuho Arakawa | 6–3, 6–3 |
| Win | 7–10 | Feb 2023 | ITF Santo Domingo, Dominican Republic | W25 | Hard | (United States) Jada Hart | (Netherlands) Arianne Hartono (Netherlands) Eva Vedder | 6–3, 6–3 |
| Loss | 7–11 | Apr 2023 | Zephyrhills Open, US | W25 | Clay | (United States) Jada Hart | Maria Kononova (Ukraine) Yuliia Starodubtseva | 5–7, 3–6 |
| Win | 8–11 | Jul 2023 | Open Castilla y León, Spain | W25 | Hard | (Australia) Alexandra Osborne | (South Korea) Ku Yeon-woo (Latvia) Diāna Marcinkēviča | 6–4, 6–3 |
| Loss | 8–12 | Feb 2024 | ITF Morelia, Mexico | W50 | Hard | (Spain) Irene Burillo | (Russia) Marina Melnikova (Netherlands) Lesley Pattinama Kerkhove | 4–6, 6–4, [9–11] |
| Loss | 8–13 | Mar 2024 | ITF Santo Domingo, Dominican Republic | W35 | Hard | (Bulgaria) Lia Karatancheva | (United States) Carmen Corley (United States) Ivana Corley | 1–6, 7–6^{(5)}, [10–12] |
| Loss | 8–14 | Apr 2024 | ITF Boca Raton, US | W35 | Clay | (United States) Maribella Zamarripa | (United States) Robin Anderson (Australia) Elysia Bolton | 6–3, 4–6, [8–10] |
| Win | 9–14 | Apr 2024 | ITF Boca Raton, US | W35 | Clay | (Russia) Maria Kononova | (Spain) Alicia Herrero Liñana (Argentina) Melany Krywoj | 2–6, 6–4, [10–5] |
| Loss | 9–15 | May 2024 | ITF Otočec, Slovenia | W50 | Clay | (Australia) Maya Joint | (Georgia (country)) Ekaterine Gorgodze (Ukraine) Valeriya Strakhova | 6–3, 4–6, [5–10] |
| Win | 10–15 | Jun 2024 | Guimarães Ladies Open, Portugal | W75 | Hard | (United States) Sophie Chang | (Portugal) Francisca Jorge (Portugal) Matilde Jorge | 7–6^{(6)}, 6–7^{(2)}, [10–5] |
| Loss | 10–16 | Jul 2024 | Roma Cup, Italy | W35 | Clay | (Switzerland) Leonie Küng | (Spain) Yvonne Cavallé Reimers (Italy) Aurora Zantedeschi | 4–6, 4–6 |
| Win | 11–16 | Sep 2024 | Templeton Open, US | W75 | Hard | (United States) Sophie Chang | (United States) Carmen Corley (Canada) Rebecca Marino | 1–6, 6–2, [10–4] |
| Loss | 11–17 | Sep 2024 | Rancho Santa Fe Open, US | W75 | Hard | (United States) Haley Giavara | (Russia) Maria Kononova (Russia) Maria Kozyreva | 2–6, 6–7^{(4)} |
| Loss | 11–18 | Oct 2024 | Edmond Open, US | W75 | Hard | (United States) Sophie Chang | (United States) Kayla Day (Australia) Jaimee Fourlis | 5–7, 5–7 |
| Win | 12–18 | Apr 2025 | ITF Boca Raton, US | W35 | Clay | (United States) Akasha Urhobo | (United States) Victoria Osuigwe (United States) Alana Smith | 5–7, 7–6^{(3)}, [10–7] |
| Win | 13–18 | May 2025 | ITF Portorož, Slovenia | W50 | Clay | (Greece) Sapfo Sakellaridi | (Argentina) Jazmín Ortenzi (Italy) Aurora Zantedeschi | 6–4, 6–3 |
| Loss | 13–19 | May 2025 | ITF Warmbad Villach, Austria | W35 | Clay | (Netherlands) Jasmijn Gimbrère | (Slovenia) Dalila Jakupović (Slovenia) Nika Radišić | 4–6, 4–6 |
| Win | 14–19 | Jun 2025 | ITF Troisdorf, Germany | W50 | Clay | (Kenya) Angella Okutoyi | (Germany) Josy Daems (Ukraine) Anastasiia Firman | 6–1, 6–1 |
| Win | 15–19 | Jul 2025 | ITF Aschaffenburg, Germany | W50 | Clay | (Kenya) Angella Okutoyi | (Germany) Laura Boehner (Switzerland) Chelsea Fontenel | 1–6, 6–2, [10–7] |
| Win | 16–19 | Sep 2025 | Berkeley Challenge, US | W35 | Hard | (Kenya) Angella Okutoyi | (Italy) Francesca Pace (Poland) Zuzanna Pawlikowska | 7–6^{(2)}, 6–4 |
| Loss | 16–20 | Oct 2025 | ITF Redding, US | W35 | Hard | (United States) Kolie Allen | (Australia) Elysia Bolton (United States) Jaeda Daniel | 5–7, 5–7 |
| Loss | 16–21 | Oct 2025 | Classic of Macon, US | W100 | Hard | (Kenya) Angella Okutoyi | (United States) Ayana Akli (United States) Eryn Cayetano | 7–6^{(4)}, 2–6, [14–16] |
| Loss | 16–22 | Nov 2025 | ITF Boca Raton, US | W35 | Clay | (United States) Akasha Urhobo | (Bosnia and Herzegovina) Ema Burgić (Ukraine) Anita Sahdiieva | 6–1, 6–7^{(1)}, [9–11] |
| Loss | 16–23 | Mar 2026 | ITF Murska Sobota, Slovenia | W75 | Hard (i) | (United States) Alana Smith | (Czech Republic) Lucie Havlíčková (Czech Republic) Laura Samson | walkover |
| Loss | 16–24 | Apr 2026 | ITF Portorož, Slovenia | W75 | Clay | (Sweden) Lisa Zaar | (Slovakia) Viktória Hrunčáková (Czech Republic) Anna Sisková | 2–6, 4–6 |
| Win | 17–24 | Apr 2026 | Chiasso Open, Switzerland | W75 | Clay | (Greece) Sapfo Sakellaridi | (Czech Republic) Aneta Kučmová (Czech Republic) Aneta Laboutková | 6–2, 3–6, [10–8] |
| Win | 18–24 | Jul 2026 | Schönbusch Open, Germany | W100 | Clay | (Kenya) Angella Okutoyi | (Serbia) Elena Milovanović (Slovenia) Kristina Novak | 6–3, 6–3 |
| Loss | 18–25 | Aug 2026 | ITF Leipzig, Germany | W75 | Clay | (Greece) Sapfo Sakellaridi | (Czech Republic) Aneta Kučmová (Czech Republic) Aneta Laboutková | 5–7, 2–6 |
