= Tennis Classic of Macon =

ITF Women's Tour
- Event name: Mercer Tennis Classic
- Location: Macon, Georgia, United States
- Venue: John Drew Smith Tennis Center
- Category: ITF Women's Circuit
- Surface: Hard
- Draw: 32S/32Q/16D
- Prize money: $60,000
- Website: ustamaconclassic.com

The Tennis Classic of Macon (currently sponsored as the Mercer Tennis Classic) is a tournament for professional female tennis players played on outdoor hardcourts. The event is classified as a $60,000 ITF Women's Circuit tournament and has been held in Macon, Georgia, United States, since 2013.

== Past finals ==
=== Singles ===
Year	Champion	Runner-up	Score
2025	(Mexico) Renata Zarazúa	(United States) Anna Rogers	6–2, 6–1
2024	Anna Blinkova	(United States) Ann Li	2–6, 6–2, 7–6^{(7–4)}
2023	(United States) Taylor Townsend	(Hungary) Panna Udvardy	6–3, 6–4
2022	(United States) Madison Brengle	(Hungary) Panna Udvardy	6–3, 6–1
2021	(United States) Madison Brengle	(Kazakhstan) Zarina Diyas	6–4, 4–6, 6–4
2020	(United States) CiCi Bellis	(Ukraine) Marta Kostyuk	6–4, 6–7^{(4–7)}, 0–0 ret.
2019	(United States) Katerina Stewart	(United States) Shelby Rogers	6–7^{(2–7)}, 6–3, 6–2
2018	(United States) Varvara Lepchenko	(Paraguay) Verónica Cepede Royg	6–4, 6–4
2017	(Slovakia) Anna Karolína Schmiedlová	(United States) Victoria Duval	6–4, 6–1
2016	(United States) Kayla Day	(United States) Danielle Collins	6–1, 6–3
2015	(Sweden) Rebecca Peterson	(United States) Anna Tatishvili	6–3, 4–6, 6–1
2014	(Ukraine) Kateryna Bondarenko	(United States) Grace Min	6–4, 7–5
2013	(Georgia (country)) Anna Tatishvili	(Croatia) Ajla Tomljanović	6–2, 1–6, 7–5

=== Doubles ===
Year	Champions	Runners-up	Score
2025	(United States) Ayana Akli (United States) Eryn Cayetano	(United States) Rasheeda McAdoo (Kenya) Angella Okutoyi	6–7^{(4–7)}, 6–2, [16–14]
2024	(United States) Sophie Chang (Poland) Katarzyna Kawa	(Brazil) Ingrid Martins (United States) Quinn Gleason	7–5, 6–4
2023	Jana Kolodynska; Tatiana Prozorova	(United States) Sofia Sewing; Anastasia Tikhonova	6–3, 6–2
2022	(United States) Anna Rogers (United States) Christina Rosca	(United States) Madison Brengle (United States) Maria Mateas	6–4, 6–4
2021	(United States) Quinn Gleason (United States) Catherine Harrison	(United States) Alycia Parks (United States) Alana Smith	6–2, 6–2
2020	(Poland) Magdalena Fręch (Poland) Katarzyna Kawa	(United States) Francesca Di Lorenzo (United States) Jamie Loeb	7–5, 6–1
2019	(United States) Usue Maitane Arconada (United States) Caroline Dolehide	(Australia) Jaimee Fourlis (Greece) Valentini Grammatikopoulou	6–7^{(2–7)}, 6–2, [10–8]
2018	(United States) Caty McNally (United States) Jessica Pegula	(Kazakhstan) Anna Danilina (United States) Ingrid Neel	6–1, 5–7, [11–9]
2017	(United States) Kaitlyn Christian (United States) Sabrina Santamaria	(Brazil) Paula Cristina Gonçalves (United States) Sanaz Marand	6–1, 6–0
2016	(Netherlands) Michaëlla Krajicek (United States) Taylor Townsend	(United States) Sabrina Santamaria (United States) Keri Wong	3–6, 6–2, [10–6]
2015	(United States) Jan Abaza (Switzerland) Viktorija Golubic	(Brazil) Paula Cristina Gonçalves (United States) Sanaz Marand	7–6^{(7–3)}, 7–5
2014	(United States) Madison Brengle (United States) Alexa Glatch	(United States) Anna Tatishvili (United States) Ashley Weinhold	6–0, 7–5
2013	(United States) Kristi Boxx (New Zealand) Abigail Guthrie	(United States) Emily Harman (United States) Elizabeth Lumpkin	3–6, 7–6^{(7–4)}, [10–4]

== See also ==
- Macon Open – men's tournament (1968–1972)
