= 2022 ITF Women's World Tennis Tour =

Details
- Duration: 3 January – December 2022
- Edition: 29th
- Categories: W100 tournaments W80 tournaments W60 tournaments W25 tournaments W15 tournaments

Achievements (singles)
- Most titles: (Czech Republic) Brenda Fruhvirtová (8)
- Most finals: (Czech Republic) Brenda Fruhvirtová (8)

The 2022 International Tennis Federation (ITF) Women's World Tennis Tour is the entry-level and mid-level tour for women's professional tennis. It is organized by the International Tennis Federation and is a tier below the Women's Tennis Association (WTA) Tour. The ITF Women's World Tennis Tour provides a professional pathway between the ITF Junior World Tennis Tour and the WTA Tour. The results of ITF tournaments are incorporated into the WTA ranking, which enables professionals to progress through to the elite levels of women's professional tennis. The ITF Women's World Tennis Tour offers approximately 500 tournaments across 65 countries and incorporates five prize money levels of tournaments: $15,000, $25,000, $60,000, $80,000 and $100,000

Tournaments at $15,000 level include reserved main draw places for Top-100 ranked ITF Juniors, providing a smooth pathway for the best new talent to break through into elite professional tennis. The ITF Women's World Tennis Tour is also designed to target prize money effectively to help reduce costs for players and ultimately enable more players to make a living.

From 1 March, following the Russian invasion of Ukraine the ITF announced that players from Belarus and Russia could still play on the tour but would not be allowed to play under the flag of Belarus or Russia.

== Cancelled/postponed tournaments ==
The following tournaments were formally announced by the ITF before being subsequently cancelled or postponed due to the COVID-19 pandemic or other reasons.

Week of	Tournament	Status
January 3	Chiang Rai, Thailand; W25 – Hard	Postponed to April 4
January 3	Sarasota, United States; W25 – Clay	Postponed to May 9
January 10	Chiang Rai, Thailand; W25 – Hard	Postponed to April 11
January 17	Minneapolis, United States; W60 – Hard (i)	Postponed to July 11 but later cancelled
January 17	Chiang Rai, Thailand; W15 – Hard	Postponed to April 18
January 24	Chiang Rai, Thailand; W15 – Hard	Postponed to April 25
March 14	Oxford, United States; W15 – Clay	Cancelled
April 4	Kazan, Russia; W25 – Hard	Cancelled due to the Russian invasion of Ukraine
April 11	San Luis Potosí, Mexico; W25 – Clay	Cancelled
April 25	Open de Cagnes-sur-Mer; Cagnes-sur-Mer, France; W80 – Clay	Cancelled
May 23	Liepāja Open; Liepāja, Latvia; W60 – Clay	Postponed to July 11
May 23	Almada, Portugal; W25 – Hard	Cancelled
May 23	Daegu, South Korea; W25 – Hard	Cancelled
May 23	Cairo, Egypt; W15 – Clay	Cancelled
May 30	Almada, Portugal; W25 – Hard	Cancelled
May 30	Goyang, South Korea; W25 – Hard	Postponed to August 22
July 4	Sezze, Italy; W15 – Hard	Cancelled
July 4	Waco, United States; W15 – Clay	Postponed to November 14
July 25	Cancún, Mexico; W15 – Hard	Cancelled
August 1	Jackson, United States; W25 – Hard	Cancelled
August 1	Cancún, Mexico; W15 – Hard	Cancelled
August 8	Bad Waltersdorf, Austria; W15 – Clay	Cancelled
August 8	Enköping, Sweden; W15 – Clay	Cancelled
August 15	Enköping, Sweden; W15 – Clay	Cancelled
August 22	Aprilia, Italy; W15 – Clay	Cancelled
August 22	Enköping, Sweden; W15 – Clay	Cancelled
August 29	Aix-en-Provence, France; W15 – Clay	Cancelled
August 29	Enköping, Sweden; W15 – Clay	Cancelled
October 17	Cartagena, Colombia; W25 – Clay	Cancelled
October 31	Norman, United States; W15 – Hard (i)	Cancelled
November 7	Lincoln, United States; W15 – Hard	Cancelled

== Participating host nations ==
- Algeria (ALG)
- Argentina (ARG)
- Australia (AUS)
- Austria (AUT)
- Belgium (BEL)
- Bosnia and Herzegovina (BIH)
- Brazil (BRA)
- Bulgaria (BUL)
- Canada (CAN)
- Colombia (COL)
- Croatia (CRO)
- Czech Republic (CZE)
- Denmark (DEN)
- Dominican Republic (DOM)
- Ecuador (ECU)
- Egypt (EGY)
- Estonia (EST)
- Finland (FIN)
- France (FRA)
- Georgia (GEO)
- Germany (GER)
- Great Britain (GBR)
- Greece (GRE)
- Hungary (HUN)
- India (IND)
- Israel (ISR)
- Italy (ITA)
- Japan (JPN)
- Kazakhstan (KAZ)
- Kenya (KEN)
- Latvia (LAT)
- Luxembourg (LUX)
- Mexico (MEX)
- Morocco (MAR)
- Netherlands (NED)
- New Zealand (NZL)
- Peru (PER)
- Poland (POL)
- Portugal (POR)
- Romania (ROU)
- Russia (RUS)
- Serbia (SRB)
- Slovakia (SVK)
- Slovenia (SLO)
- South Africa (RSA)
- South Korea (KOR)
- Spain (ESP)
- Sweden (SWE)
- Switzerland (SUI)
- Thailand (THA)
- Tunisia (TUN)
- Turkey (TUR)
- United Arab Emirates (UAE)
- United States (USA)

== WTA ranking points distribution ==
Category	W	F	SF	QF	R16	R32	R64	Q	FQR	Q2	Q1
W100+H (48S, 32Q)	150	90	55	28	14	7	1	6	4	–	–
W100+H (32S, 32/24Q)	150	90	55	28	14	1	–	6	4	–	–
W100+H (32S, 48/64Q)	150	90	55	28	14	1	–	6	4	–	–
W100+H (16D)	150	90	55	28	1	–	–	–	–	–	–
W100 (48S, 32Q)	140	85	50	25	13	7	1	6	4	–	–
W100 (32S, 32/24Q)	140	85	50	25	13	1	–	6	4	–	–
W100 (32S, 48/64Q)	140	85	50	25	13	1	–	6	4	–	–
W100 (16D)	140	85	50	25	1	–	–	–	–	–	–
W80+H (48S, 32Q)	130	80	48	24	12	6	1	5	3	–	–
W80+H (32S, 32/24Q)	130	80	48	24	12	1	–	5	3	–	–
W80+H (32S, 48/64Q)	130	80	48	24	12	1	–	5	3	–	–
W80+H (16D)	130	80	48	24	1	–	–	–	–	–	–
W80 (48S, 32Q)	115	70	42	21	10	6	1	5	3	–	–
W80 (32S, 32/24Q)	115	70	42	21	10	1	–	5	3	–	–
W80 (32S, 48/64Q)	115	70	42	21	10	1	–	5	3	–	–
W80 (16D)	115	70	42	21	1	–	–	–	–	–	–
W60+H (48S, 32Q)	100	60	36	18	9	5	1	5	3	–	–
W60+H (32S, 32/24Q)	100	60	36	18	9	1	–	5	3	–	–
W60+H (32S, 48/64Q)	100	60	36	18	9	1	–	5	3	–	–
W60+H (16D)	100	60	36	18	1	–	–	–	–	–	–
W60 (48S, 32Q)	80	48	29	15	8	5	1	5	3	–	–
W60 (32S, 32/24Q)	80	48	29	15	8	1	–	5	3	–	–
W60 (32S, 48/64Q)	80	48	29	15	8	1	–	5	3	–	–
W60 (16D)	80	48	29	15	1	–	–	–	–	–	–
W25+H (48S, 32Q)	60	36	22	11	6	3	1	2	–	–	–
W25+H (32S, 32/24Q)	60	36	22	11	6	1	–	2	–	–	–
W25+H (32S, 48/64Q)	60	36	22	11	6	1	–	2	–	–	–
W25+H (16D)	60	36	22	11	1	–	–	–	–	–	–
W25 (48S, 32Q)	50	30	18	9	5	3	1	1	–	–	–
W25 (32S, 32/24Q)	50	30	18	9	5	–	–	1	–	–	–
W25 (32S, 48/64Q)	50	30	18	9	5	–	–	1	–	–	–
W25 (16D)	50	30	18	9	1	–	–	–	–	–	–
W15/W15+H (32S, 32/24Q)	10	6	4	2	1	–	–	–	–	–	–
W15/W15+H (32S, 48/64Q)	10	6	4	3	2	–	–	–	–	–	–
W15/W15+H (16D)	10	6	4	1	–	–	–	–	–	–	–

- "+H" indicates that hospitality is provided.

== Prize money distribution ==
Category	W	F	SF	QF	R16	R32	R64	FQR	Q2	Q1
W100/W100+H (48S, 32Q)	$12,285	$6,495	$3,846	$2,378	$1,559	$926	$415	$381.75	–	$237
W100/W100+H (32S, 32/24Q)	$15,239	$8,147	$4,473	$2,573	$1,559	$926	–	$509	–	$316
W100/W100+H (32S, 48/64Q)	$15,239	$8,147	$4,473	$2,573	$1,559	$926	–	$381.75	$237	–
W100/W100+H (16D)	$5,573	$2,787	$1,393	$760	$507	–	–	–	–	–
W80/W80+H (48S, 32Q)	$9,798	$5,178	$3,077	$1,904	$1,248	$740	$335	$305.25	–	$189.75
W80/W80+H (32S, 32/24Q)	$12,192	$6,518	$3,580	$2,059	$1,248	$740	–	$407	–	$253
W80/W80+H (32S, 48/64Q)	$12,192	$6,518	$3,580	$2,059	$1,248	$740	–	$305.25	$189.75	–
W80/W80+H (16D)	$4,460	$2,230	$1,115	$608	$405	–	–	–	–	–
W60/W60+H (48S, 32Q)	$7,344	$3,882	$2,308	$1,427	$935	$557	$251	$228.75	–	$141.75
W60/W60+H (32S, 32/24Q)	$9,142	$4,886	$2,683	$1,543	$935	$557	–	$305	–	$189
W60/W60+H (32S, 48/64Q)	$9,142	$4,886	$2,683	$1,543	$935	$557	–	$228.75	$141.75	–
W60/W60+H (16D)	$3,344	$1,672	$836	$456	$304	–	–	–	–	–
W25/W25+H (48S, 32Q)	$3,188	$1,684	$1,001	$617	$408	$244	$107	$96.50	–	$50
W25/W25+H (32S, 32/24Q)	$3,935	$2,107	$1,162	$672	$408	$244	–	$126	–	$68
W25/W25+H (32S, 48/64Q)	$3,935	$2,107	$1,162	$672	$408	$244	–	$96.50	$50	–
W25/W25+H (16D)	$1,437	$719	$359	$196	$131	–	–	–	–	–
W15/W15+H (32S, 32/24Q)	$2,352	$1,470	$734	$367	$294	$147	–	–	–	–
W15/W15+H (32S, 48/64Q)	$2,352	$1,470	$734	$367	$294	$147	–	–	–	–
W15/W15+H (16D)	$955	$515	$294	$147	$74	–	–	–	–	–

- All prize money in U.S. dollars
- Doubles prize money per team

== Statistics ==
=== Key ===
Category
W100 tournaments
W80 tournaments
W60 tournaments
W25 tournaments
W15 tournaments

These tables present the number of singles (S) and doubles (D) titles won by each player and each nation during the season. The players/nations are sorted by:

1. Total number of titles (a doubles title won by two players representing the same nation counts as only one win for the nation)
2. A singles > doubles hierarchy
3. Alphabetical order (by family names for players).

To avoid confusion and double counting, these tables should be updated only after all events of the week are completed.

=== Titles won by player ===
Updated as of 01 January

Total	Player	W100		W80		W60		W25		W15		Total	
Total	Player	S	D	S	D	S	D	S	D	S	D	S	D
16	Wei Sijia (CHN)						1			6	9	6	10
13	Priska Madelyn Nugroho (INA)						1	2	3	3	4	5	8
12	Sapfo Sakellaridi (GRE)								6	4	2	4	8
11	Francisca Jorge (POR)						1	1	9			1	10
10	Anastasia Zolotareva						1	2		4	3	6	4
10	Cody Wong (HKG)						1		7	1	1	1	9
9	Brenda Fruhvirtová (CZE)							8	1			8	1
9	Jéssica Bouzas Maneiro (ESP)						1	3	3	2		5	4
9	Eudice Chong (HKG)						1	1	6		1	1	8
9	Valeriya Strakhova (UKR)						1		7		1	0	9
9	Tsao Chia-yi (TPE)										9	0	9
8	Sophie Chang (USA)		2				3	2	1			2	6
8	Saki Imamura (JPN)								2	1	5	1	7
8	Matilde Jorge (POR)								8			0	8
8	Miriam Kolodziejová (CZE)		1		1		3		2		1	0	8
8	Wu Fang-hsien (TPE)						2		3		3	0	8
7	Leyre Romero Gormaz (ESP)						1	4	2			4	3
7	Talia Gibson (AUS)						1		2	3	1	3	4
7	Mariia Tkacheva						1	1		2	3	3	4
7	Ekaterina Makarova						1	2	4			2	5
7	Irina Khromacheva						1	1	5			1	6
7	Caijsa Hennemann (SWE)							2	5			2	5
7	Andrea Gámiz (VEN)						2		5			0	7
7	Lee Ya-hsin (TPE)										7	0	7
6	Arantxa Rus (NED)					1	1	2	2			3	3
6	Aneta Kučmová (CZE)						1	1	1	2	1	3	3
6	Aliona Bolsova (ESP)		1			2	3					2	4
6	Han Na-lae (KOR)						1	2	3			2	4
6	Weronika Falkowska (POL)						1	1	4			1	5
6	Justina Mikulskytė (LTU)						1	1	4			1	5
6	Sofia Sewing (USA)								3	2	1	2	4
6	Ilinca Amariei (ROU)									2	4	2	4
6	Ksenia Laskutova									2	4	2	4
6	Amarissa Kiara Tóth (HUN)								2	1	3	1	5
6	Anastasiia Gureva									1	5	1	5
6	Lee Pei-chi (TPE)								2	1	3	1	5
6	Jesika Malečková (CZE)						4		1		1	0	6
6	Angelica Moratelli (ITA)						1		4		1	0	6
6	Doğa Türkmen (TUR)										6	0	6
6	Cho I-hsuan (TPE)										6	0	6
5	Séléna Janicijevic (FRA)							4		1		5	0
5	Jaimee Fourlis (AUS)					1		2	2			3	2
5	Diana Shnaider					1	1	1	1	1		3	2
5	Asia Muhammad (USA)							3	2			3	2
5	Anastasia Zakharova							3	2			3	2
5	Darja Semenistaja (LAT)							3	1		1	3	2
5	Elena Pridankina									3	2	3	2
5	Alexandra Bozovic (AUS)						1	2	2			2	3
5	Guiomar Maristany (ESP)						1	1	2	1		2	3
5	Haruna Arakawa (JPN)							1	2	1	1	2	3
5	Mayuka Aikawa (JPN)								2	2	1	2	3
5	Yang Ya-yi (TPE)								1	2	2	2	3
5	Martina Capurro Taborda (ARG)									2	3	2	3
5	Laura Hietaranta (FIN)									2	3	2	3
5	Stéphanie Visscher (NED)									2	3	2	3
5	Lea Bošković (CRO)					1			4			1	4
5	Bárbara Gatica (CHI)						1	1	3			1	4
5	Magali Kempen (BEL)						1	1	3			1	4
5	Andrea Lázaro García (ESP)						1	1	3			1	4
5	Camilla Rosatello (ITA)						1	1	2			1	4
5	Anna Ureke									1	4	1	4
5	Anna Danilina (KAZ)		2				2		1			0	5
5	Ali Collins (GBR)				1		1		3			0	5
5	Anna Rogers (USA)						2		3			0	5
5	Jessie Aney (USA)						1		4			0	5
5	Ankita Raina (IND)						1		4			0	5
5	Ekaterina Yashina						1		3		1	0	5
5	Naïma Karamoko (SUI)						1				4	0	5
5	Veronika Erjavec (SLO)								4		1	0	5
5	Zhibek Kulambayeva (KAZ)								3		2	0	5
5	Yao Xinxin (CHN)										5	0	5
5	Li Yu-yun (TPE)										5	0	5
5	Cho Yi-tsen (TPE)										5	0	5
4	Mirra Andreeva					1		1		2		4	0
4	Sonay Kartal (GBR)							4				4	0
4	Polina Kudermetova							3		1		4	0
4	Stacey Fung (CAN)							1		3		4	0
4	Marina Bassols Ribera (ESP)			1		1		1	1			3	1
4	Gao Xinyu (CHN)							3			1	3	1
4	Joanna Garland (TPE)							2	1	1		3	1
4	Céline Naef (SUI)							1		2	1	3	1
4	Polina Iatcenko								1	3		3	1
4	Lola Radivojević (SRB)									3	1	3	1
4	Hanne Vandewinkel (BEL)									3	1	3	1
4	Ylena In-Albon (SUI)				1	1		1	1			2	2
4	Luksika Kumkhum (THA)							1	2	1		2	2
4	Jessika Ponchet (FRA)					1	1	1	1			2	2
4	Peyton Stearns (USA)						1	2	1			2	2
4	Katharina Hobgarski (GER)							2	1		1	2	2
4	María Herazo González (COL)							1		1	2	2	2
4	Karola Bejenaru (ROU)									2	2	2	2
4	Tamara Čurović (SRB)									2	2	2	2
4	Jang Su-jeong (KOR)		1			1	2					1	3
4	Ángela Fita Boluda (ESP)					1	1		2			1	3
4	Eva Vedder (NED)						2	1	1			1	3
4	Maria Timofeeva							1	3			1	3
4	Naho Sato (JPN)								2	1	1	1	3
4	Punnin Kovapitukted (THA)								1	1	2	1	3
4	Lexie Stevens (NED)								1	1	2	1	3
4	Daria Lodikova									1	3	1	3
4	Ivana Šebestová (CZE)									1	3	1	3
4	Angela Kulikov (USA)		1				3					0	4
4	Maria Kozyreva				1				2		1	0	4
4	Christina Rosca (USA)						1		3			0	4
4	Freya Christie (GBR)				1		1		2			0	4
4	Anastasia Dețiuc (CZE)						3		1			0	4
4	Fernanda Contreras (MEX)						2		2			0	4
4	Rebeca Pereira (BRA)						1		3			0	4
4	Ekaterina Reyngold						1		3			0	4
4	Naiktha Bains (GBR)								4			0	4
4	Momoko Kobori (JPN)								4			0	4
4	Erika Sema (JPN)								4			0	4
4	Yasmin Ezzat (EGY)										4	0	4
4	Dimitra Pavlou (GRE)										4	0	4
4	Melis Ayda Uyar (TUR)										4	0	4
3	Zhu Lin (CHN)	1				1		1				3	0
3	Madison Brengle (USA)					3						3	0
3	Petra Marčinko (CRO)			1				2				3	0
3	Sára Bejlek (CZE)					2		1				3	0
3	Julia Grabher (AUT)					2		1				3	0
3	Lucrezia Stefanini (ITA)					2		1				3	0
3	Katie Swan (GBR)					2		1				3	0
3	Moyuka Uchijima (JPN)					2		1				3	0
3	Priscilla Hon (AUS)							3				3	0
3	Elizabeth Mandlik (USA)							3				3	0
3	Katrina Scott (USA)							3				3	0
3	Natália Szabanin (HUN)							3				3	0
3	Rosa Vicens Mas (ESP)							2		1		3	0
3	Bai Zhuoxuan (CHN)							2		1		3	0
3	Hurricane Tyra Black (USA)							1		2		3	0
3	Lucija Ćirić Bagarić (CRO)									3		3	0
3	Sakura Hosogi (JPN)									3		3	0
3	Manon Léonard (FRA)									3		3	0
3	Solana Sierra (ARG)									3		3	0
3	Kaitlin Quevedo (USA)									3		3	0
3	Kristina Mladenovic (FRA)		1			2						2	1
3	Linda Nosková (CZE)	1				1	1					2	1
3	Carol Zhao (CAN)	1						1	1			2	1
3	Panna Udvardy (HUN)		1			2						2	1
3	Maja Chwalińska (POL)					1	1	1				2	1
3	Réka Luca Jani (HUN)					1		1	1			2	1
3	Iryna Shymanovich					1		1	1			2	1
3	Nigina Abduraimova (UZB)							2	1			2	1
3	Sinja Kraus (AUT)							2	1			2	1
3	Silvia Ambrosio (GER)							1		1	1	2	1
3	Kristina Dmitruk							1		1	1	2	1
3	Francesca Curmi (MLT)								1	2		2	1
3	Liu Fangzhou (CHN)								1	2		2	1
3	Emily Seibold (GER)								1	2		2	1
3	Nahia Berecoechea (FRA)									2	1	2	1
3	Eryn Cayetano (USA)									2	1	2	1
3	Luisa Meyer auf der Heide (GER)									2	1	2	1
3	Oleksandra Oliynykova (UKR)									2	1	2	1
3	Antonia Schmidt (GER)									2	1	2	1
3	Li Zongyu (CHN)									2	1	2	1
3	Markéta Vondroušová (CZE)	1	1		1							1	2
3	Rebeka Masarova (ESP)		1			1	1					1	2
3	Lisa Pigato (ITA)						2			1		1	2
3	Destanee Aiava (AUS)						1	1	1			1	2
3	Inès Ibbou (ALG)						1			1	1	1	2
3	Taylor Ng (USA)							1	2			1	2
3	Alice Robbe (FRA)							1	2			1	2
3	Kyōka Okamura (JPN)							1	2			1	2
3	Lena Papadakis (GER)							1	2			1	2
3	Dominika Šalková (CZE)							1	1		1	1	2
3	Ma Yexin (CHN)								2	1		1	2
3	Tiphanie Fiquet (FRA)								1	1	1	1	2
3	Katarina Kozarov (SRB)								1	1	1	1	2
3	Chiara Scholl (USA)								1	1	1	1	2
3	Hiromi Abe (JPN)									1	2	1	2
3	Dasha Ivanova (USA)									1	2	1	2
3	Makenna Jones (USA)									1	2	1	2
3	Yana Karpovich									1	2	1	2
3	Kristina Paskauskas (GBR)									1	2	1	2
3	Valentina Ryser (SUI)									1	2	1	2
3	Vivian Yang (NZL)									1	2	1	2
3	Tímea Babos (HUN)		2				1					0	3
3	Arianne Hartono (NED)		1				1		1			0	3
3	Amina Anshba		1						2			0	3
3	Kateryna Volodko (UKR)						2		1			0	3
3	Darya Astakhova						1		2			0	3
3	Valentini Grammatikopoulou (GRE)						1		2			0	3
3	Catherine Harrison (USA)						1		2			0	3
3	Isabelle Haverlag (NED)						1		2			0	3
3	Xenia Knoll (SUI)						1		2			0	3
3	Arina Rodionova (AUS)						1		2			0	3
3	Anna Sisková (CZE)						1		2			0	3
3	Sofya Lansere						1		2			0	3
3	Maia Lumsden (GBR)						1		2			0	3
3	Prarthana Thombare (IND)						1		2			0	3
3	Olivia Tjandramulia (AUS)						1		2			0	3
3	Karolína Kubáňová (CZE)						1		1		1	0	3
3	Oana Gavrilă (ROU)								3			0	3
3	Funa Kozaki (JPN)								3			0	3
3	Elena Malõgina (EST)								3			0	3
3	Lu Jiajing (CHN)								3			0	3
3	Rutuja Bhosale (IND)								3			0	3
3	Peangtarn Plipuech (THA)								3			0	3
3	Nika Radišić (SLO)								3			0	3
3	Jacqueline Cabaj Awad (SWE)								2		1	0	3
3	Jasmijn Gimbrère (NED)								2		1	0	3
3	Oana Georgeta Simion (ROU)								2		1	0	3
3	Océane Babel (FRA)								1		2	0	3
3	Misaki Matsuda (JPN)								1		2	0	3
3	Veronica Miroshnichenko								1		2	0	3
3	Anastasia Abbagnato (ITA)										3	0	3
3	Anastasia Iamachkine (PER)										3	0	3
3	Fernanda Labraña (CHI)										3	0	3
3	Michaela Laki (GRE)										3	0	3
3	Inês Murta (POR)										3	0	3
3	Honoka Kobayashi (JPN)										3	0	3
3	Laïa Petretic (FRA)										3	0	3
3	Celine Simunyu (IRL)										3	0	3
3	Anna Zyryanova										3	0	3
2	Taylor Townsend (USA)	1		1								2	0
2	Wang Xinyu (CHN)	1				1						2	0
2	Robin Anderson (USA)			1		1						2	0
2	Elisabetta Cocciaretto (ITA)			1		1						2	0
2	Kamilla Rakhimova					2						2	0
2	Yuan Yue (CHN)					2						2	0
2	Ana Konjuh (CRO)					1		1				2	0
2	Tamara Korpatsch (GER)					1		1				2	0
2	Laura Siegemund (GER)					1		1				2	0
2	Raluca Șerban (CYP)					1		1				2	0
2	Karman Thandi (IND)					1		1				2	0
2	Tara Würth (CRO)					1		1				2	0
2	Barbora Palicová (CZE)					1				1		2	0
2	Çağla Büyükakçay (TUR)							2				2	0
2	Kayla Day (USA)							2				2	0
2	Vitalia Diatchenko							2				2	0
2	Haruka Kaji (JPN)							2				2	0
2	Adithya Karunaratne (HKG)							2				2	0
2	Anna Kubareva							2				2	0
2	Antonia Ružić (CRO)							2				2	0
2	Sofia Samavati (DEN)							2				2	0
2	Liv Hovde (USA)							1		1		2	0
2	Carlota Martínez Círez (ESP)							1		1		2	0
2	Zeynep Sönmez (TUR)							1		1		2	0
2	Sahaja Yamalapalli (IND)							1		1		2	0
2	Tatiana Barkova									2		2	0
2	Bianca Behúlová (SVK)									2		2	0
2	Federica Bilardo (ITA)									2		2	0
2	Alina Charaeva									2		2	0
2	Katy Dunne (GBR)									2		2	0
2	Han Jiangxue (CHN)									2		2	0
2	Julia Middendorf (GER)									2		2	0
2	Ayumi Morita (JPN)									2		2	0
2	Maileen Nuudi (EST)									2		2	0
2	Kajsa Rinaldo Persson (SWE)									2		2	0
2	Caroline Roméo (FRA)									2		2	0
2	Chantal Sauvant (GER)									2		2	0
2	Alice Tubello (FRA)									2		2	0
2	Lizette Cabrera (AUS)		1					1				1	1
2	Victoria Jiménez Kasintseva (AND)		1					1				1	1
2	Ashlyn Krueger (USA)					1	1					1	1
2	Yuriko Miyazaki (GBR)					1	1					1	1
2	Robin Montgomery (USA)					1	1					1	1
2	Anastasia Tikhonova					1	1					1	1
2	Simona Waltert (SUI)					1	1					1	1
2	María Carlé (ARG)					1			1			1	1
2	Mai Hontama (JPN)					1			1			1	1
2	Miyu Kato (JPN)					1					1	1	1
2	Emina Bektas (USA)						1	1				1	1
2	Matilde Paoletti (ITA)						1	1				1	1
2	Adriana Reami (USA)						1	1				1	1
2	Ava Markham (USA)						1			1		1	1
2	Emily Appleton (GBR)							1	1			1	1
2	Mona Barthel (GER)							1	1			1	1
2	Marie Benoît (BEL)							1	1			1	1
2	Miriam Bulgaru (ROU)							1	1			1	1
2	Yvonne Cavallé Reimers (ESP)							1	1			1	1
2	Lina Gjorcheska (MKD)							1	1			1	1
2	Malene Helgø (NOR)							1	1			1	1
2	Ekaterina Maklakova							1	1			1	1
2	Suzan Lamens (NED)							1	1			1	1
2	Jamie Loeb (USA)							1	1			1	1
2	İpek Öz (TUR)							1	1			1	1
2	Valeria Savinykh							1	1			1	1
2	Eden Silva (GBR)							1	1			1	1
2	Natalija Stevanović (SRB)							1	1			1	1
2	Nina Stojanović (SRB)							1	1			1	1
2	Ikumi Yamazaki (JPN)							1	1			1	1
2	Nina Potočnik (SLO)							1			1	1	1
2	Gergana Topalova (BUL)							1			1	1	1
2	Mana Ayukawa (JPN)								1	1		1	1
2	Noma Noha Akugue (GER)								1	1		1	1
2	Alina Korneeva								1	1		1	1
2	Rina Saigo (JPN)								1	1		1	1
2	Lara Salden (BEL)								1	1		1	1
2	Noelia Zeballos (BOL)								1	1		1	1
2	Vaidehi Chaudhari (IND)									1	1	1	1
2	Aliona Falei									1	1	1	1
2	Tilwith Di Girolami (BEL)									1	1	1	1
2	Anastasia Grymalska (ITA)									1	1	1	1
2	Jessica Hinojosa Gómez (MEX)									1	1	1	1
2	Hina Inoue (USA)									1	1	1	1
2	Polina Leykina									1	1	1	1
2	Yasmine Mansouri (FRA)									1	1	1	1
2	Luciana Moyano (ARG)									1	1	1	1
2	Lucie Nguyen Tan (FRA)									1	1	1	1
2	Valeriia Olianovskaia									1	1	1	1
2	Amelia Rajecki (GBR)									1	1	1	1
2	Merna Refaat (EGY)									1	1	1	1
2	Victoria Rodríguez (MEX)									1	1	1	1
2	Sandra Samir (EGY)									1	1	1	1
2	Back Da-yeon (KOR)									1	1	1	1
2	Johanne Svendsen (DEN)									1	1	1	1
2	Patricia Maria Țig (ROU)									1	1	1	1
2	Eliessa Vanlangendonck (BEL)									1	1	1	1
2	Alicia Barnett (GBR)		1				1					0	2
2	Nao Hibino (JPN)		1				1					0	2
2	Katarzyna Kawa (POL)		1		1							0	2
2	Olivia Nicholls (GBR)		1				1					0	2
2	Alycia Parks (USA)		1				1					0	2
2	Aldila Sutjiadi (INA)		1				1					0	2
2	Elvina Kalieva (USA)				1		1					0	2
2	Cristina Bucșa (ESP)				1				1			0	2
2	Mariam Bolkvadze (GEO)						2					0	2
2	Dalila Jakupović (SLO)						2					0	2
2	Samantha Murray Sharan (GBR)						2					0	2
2	Sabrina Santamaria (USA)						2					0	2
2	Katarina Zavatska (UKR)						2					0	2
2	Michaela Bayerlová (CZE)						1		1			0	2
2	Estelle Cascino (FRA)						1		1			0	2
2	Hsieh Yu-chieh (TPE)						1		1			0	2
2	Ioana Loredana Roșca (ROU)						1		1			0	2
2	Jessy Rompies (INA)						1		1			0	2
2	Carmen Corley (USA)						1				1	0	2
2	Ivana Corley (USA)						1				1	0	2
2	Lisa Mays (AUS)						1				1	0	2
2	Choi Ji-hee (KOR)								2			0	2
2	Angelina Gabueva								2			0	2
2	Ilona Georgiana Ghioroaie (ROU)								2			0	2
2	Petra Hule (AUS)								2			0	2
2	Katarina Jokić (SRB)								2			0	2
2	Gabriela Knutson (CZE)								2			0	2
2	Quirine Lemoine (NED)								2			0	2
2	Alana Parnaby (AUS)								2			0	2
2	Conny Perrin (SUI)								2			0	2
2	Daniela Seguel (CHI)								2			0	2
2	Lee Ya-hsuan (TPE)								2			0	2
2	Allura Zamarripa (USA)								2			0	2
2	Maribella Zamarripa (USA)								2			0	2
2	Natsuho Arakawa (JPN)								1		1	0	2
2	Martina Colmegna (ITA)								1		1	0	2
2	Vanessa Ersöz (SWE)								1		1	0	2
2	Alicia Herrero Liñana (ESP)								1		1	0	2
2	Aoi Ito (JPN)								1		1	0	2
2	Melanie Klaffner (AUT)								1		1	0	2
2	Melany Krywoj (ARG)								1		1	0	2
2	Andrė Lukošiūtė (LTU)								1		1	0	2
2	Eliz Maloney (GBR)								1		1	0	2
2	Kanako Morisaki (JPN)								1		1	0	2
2	Ekaterina Ovcharenko								1		1	0	2
2	María Paulina Pérez (COL)								1		1	0	2
2	Aurora Zantedeschi (ITA)								1		1	0	2
2	Magdalini Adaloglou (GRE)										2	0	2
2	Noelia Bouzó Zanotti (ESP)										2	0	2
2	Romina Ccuno (PER)										2	0	2
2	Diletta Cherubini (ITA)										2	0	2
2	Eleni Christofi (GRE)										2	0	2
2	Paris Corley (USA)										2	0	2
2	Mariana Dražić (CRO)										2	0	2
2	Dia Evtimova (BUL)										2	0	2
2	Virginia Ferrara (ITA)										2	0	2
2	Miharu Imanishi (JPN)										2	0	2
2	Valentina Ivanov (NZL)										2	0	2
2	Lauryn John-Baptiste (GBR)										2	0	2
2	Maryna Kolb (UKR)										2	0	2
2	Nadiya Kolb (UKR)										2	0	2
2	Maria Kononova										2	0	2
2	Vlada Koval										2	0	2
2	Leonie Küng (SUI)										2	0	2
2	Jennifer Luikham (IND)										2	0	2
2	Bojana Marinković (SRB)										2	0	2
2	Elena Milovanović (SRB)										2	0	2
2	María Fernanda Navarro (MEX)										2	0	2
2	Simona Ogescu (ROU)										2	0	2
2	Patricija Paukštytė (LTU)										2	0	2
2	Georgia Pedone (ITA)										2	0	2
2	Lauren Proctor (USA)										2	0	2
2	Nina Radovanovic (FRA)										2	0	2
2	Zdena Šafářová (CZE)										2	0	2
2	Maria Sholokhova										2	0	2
2	Beatrice Stagno (ITA)										2	0	2
2	Anastasia Sukhotina										2	0	2
2	Anna Ulyashchenko (USA)										2	0	2
1	Dalma Gálfi (HUN)	1										1	0
1	Elsa Jacquemot (FRA)	1										1	0
1	Danka Kovinić (MNE)	1										1	0
1	Gabriela Lee (ROU)	1										1	0
1	Jasmine Paolini (ITA)	1										1	0
1	Kateřina Siniaková (CZE)	1										1	0
1	Alison Van Uytvanck (BEL)	1										1	0
1	Katie Volynets (USA)	1										1	0
1	Jaqueline Cristian (ROU)			1								1	0
1	Marcela Zacarías (MEX)			1								1	0
1	Kimberly Birrell (AUS)					1						1	0
1	Ana Bogdan (ROU)					1						1	0
1	Ysaline Bonaventure (BEL)					1						1	0
1	Katie Boulter (GBR)					1						1	0
1	Lucia Bronzetti (ITA)					1						1	0
1	Louisa Chirico (USA)					1						1	0
1	Mina Hodzic (GER)					1						1	0
1	Anzhelika Isaeva					1						1	0
1	Eva Lys (GER)					1						1	0
1	Tena Lukas (CRO)					1						1	0
1	Tatjana Maria (GER)					1						1	0
1	Rebecca Marino (CAN)					1						1	0
1	Greet Minnen (BEL)					1						1	0
1	Emma Navarro (USA)					1						1	0
1	Jule Niemeier (GER)					1						1	0
1	Oksana Selekhmeteva					1						1	0
1	Kathinka von Deichmann (LIE)					1						1	0
1	Zheng Qinwen (CHN)					1						1	0
1	Audrey Albié (FRA)							1				1	0
1	Tessah Andrianjafitrimo (FRA)							1				1	0
1	Mirjam Björklund (SWE)							1				1	0
1	Anna Brogan (GBR)							1				1	0
1	Alexandra Cadanțu-Ignatik (ROU)							1				1	0
1	Gabriela Cé (BRA)							1				1	0
1	Alex Eala (PHI)							1				1	0
1	Jana Fett (CRO)							1				1	0
1	Linda Fruhvirtová (CZE)							1				1	0
1	Denislava Glushkova (BUL)							1				1	0
1	Elizabeth Halbauer (USA)							1				1	0
1	Léolia Jeanjean (FRA)							1				1	0
1	Jana Kolodynska							1				1	0
1	Anastasia Kulikova (FIN)							1				1	0
1	Danielle Lao (USA)							1				1	0
1	Vera Lapko							1				1	0
1	Victoria Mboko (CAN)							1				1	0
1	Marina Melnikova							1				1	0
1	Carole Monnet (FRA)							1				1	0
1	Kurumi Nara (JPN)							1				1	0
1	Paula Ormaechea (ARG)							1				1	0
1	Pemra Özgen (TUR)							1				1	0
1	Lesley Pattinama Kerkhove (NED)							1				1	0
1	Julia Riera (ARG)							1				1	0
1	Mia Ristić (SRB)							1				1	0
1	Andreea Roșca (ROU)							1				1	0
1	Katherine Sebov (CAN)							1				1	0
1	Julie Štruplová (CZE)							1				1	0
1	Wang Yafan (CHN)							1				1	0
1	Clara Tauson (DEN)							1				1	0
1	Eleonora Alvisi (ITA)									1		1	0
1	Manon Arcangioli (FRA)									1		1	0
1	Julie Belgraver (FRA)									1		1	0
1	Loïs Boisson (FRA)									1		1	0
1	Elena-Teodora Cadar (ROU)									1		1	0
1	Jenna DeFalco (USA)									1		1	0
1	Tian Fangran (CHN)									1		1	0
1	Lya Fernández (MEX)									1		1	0
1	Olga Helmi (DEN)									1		1	0
1	Sina Herrmann (GER)									1		1	0
1	Jeong Su-nam (KOR)									1		1	0
1	Yasmine Kabbaj (MAR)									1		1	0
1	Nadine Keller (SUI)									1		1	0
1	Jenny Lim (FRA)									1		1	0
1	Barbora Matúšová (SVK)									1		1	0
1	Rebecca Munk Mortensen (DEN)									1		1	0
1	Martina Okáľová (SVK)									1		1	0
1	Angelica Raggi (ITA)									1		1	0
1	Tiantsoa Sarah Rakotomanga Rajaonah (FRA)									1		1	0
1	Alba Rey García (ESP)									1		1	0
1	Beatrice Ricci (ITA)									1		1	0
1	Lucía Peyre (ARG)									1		1	0
1	Gabriela Rivera (GUA)									1		1	0
1	Madison Sieg (USA)									1		1	0
1	Anastasiya Soboleva (UKR)									1		1	0
1	Tess Sugnaux (SUI)									1		1	0
1	Gaia Squarcialupi (ITA)									1		1	0
1	Julia Terziyska (BUL)									1		1	0
1	Ramu Ueda (JPN)									1		1	0
1	Vicky Van de Peer (BEL)									1		1	0
1	Maria Vittoria Viviani (ITA)									1		1	0
1	Vivian Wolff (USA)									1		1	0
1	İlay Yörük (TUR)									1		1	0
1	Anca Alexia Todoni (ROU)									1		1	0
1	Ingrid Neel (USA)		1									0	1
1	Rosalie van der Hoek (NED)		1									0	1
1	Sachia Vickery (USA)		1									0	1
1	Renata Zarazúa (MEX)		1									0	1
1	Ashley Lahey (USA)				1							0	1
1	Katarzyna Piter (POL)				1							0	1
1	Kimberley Zimmermann (BEL)				1							0	1
1	Kolie Allen (USA)						1					0	1
1	Carolyn Ansari (USA)						1					0	1
1	Ariana Arseneault (CAN)						1					0	1
1	Hailey Baptiste (USA)						1					0	1
1	Anna Blinkova						1					0	1
1	Maria Bondarenko						1					0	1
1	Nuria Brancaccio (ITA)						1					0	1
1	Kaitlyn Christian (USA)						1					0	1
1	Jenny Dürst (SUI)						1					0	1
1	Liang En-shuo (TPE)						1					0	1
1	Alena Fomina-Klotz						1					0	1
1	Ingrid Gamarra Martins (BRA)						1					0	1
1	Giulia Gatto-Monticone (ITA)						1					0	1
1	Ivana Jorović (SRB)						1					0	1
1	Elixane Lechemia (FRA)						1					0	1
1	Julia Lohoff (GER)						1					0	1
1	Lidziya Marozava						1					0	1
1	Tara Moore (GBR)						1					0	1
1	Sada Nahimana (BDI)						1					0	1
1	Whitney Osuigwe (USA)						1					0	1
1	Despina Papamichail (GRE)						1					0	1
1	Isabella Shinikova (BUL)						1					0	1
1	Rebecca Šramková (SVK)						1					0	1
1	Lulu Sun (SUI)						1					0	1
1	Renata Voráčová (CZE)						1					0	1
1	Gozal Ainitdinova (KAZ)								1			0	1
1	Kamilla Bartone (LAT)								1			0	1
1	Nefisa Berberović (BIH)								1			0	1
1	Elysia Bolton (AUS)								1			0	1
1	Irene Burillo Escorihuela (ESP)								1			0	1
1	Irina Cantos Siemers (GER)								1			0	1
1	Kylie Collins (USA)								1			0	1
1	Sofia Costoulas (BEL)								1			0	1
1	Kayla Cross (CAN)								1			0	1
1	Tina Cvetkovič (SLO)								1			0	1
1	Cristina Dinu (ROU)								1			0	1
1	Julieta Estable (ARG)								1			0	1
1	Anna Gabric (GER)								1			0	1
1	Georgina García Pérez (ESP)								1			0	1
1	Elaine Genovese (MLT)								1			0	1
1	Quinn Gleason (USA)								1			0	1
1	Erina Hayashi (JPN)								1			0	1
1	Denisa Hindová (CZE)								1			0	1
1	Paige Hourigan (NZL)								1			0	1
1	Maddison Inglis (AUS)								1			0	1
1	Hsu Chieh-yu (TPE)								1			0	1
1	Lia Karatancheva (BUL)								1			0	1
1	Mana Kawamura (JPN)								1			0	1
1	Nicole Khirin (ISR)								1			0	1
1	Allie Kiick (USA)								1			0	1
1	Shavit Kimchi (ISR)								1			0	1
1	Anna Klasen (GER)								1			0	1
1	Martyna Kubka (POL)								1			0	1
1	Hiroko Kuwata (JPN)								1			0	1
1	Yuliana Lizarazo (COL)								1			0	1
1	Maegan Manasse (USA)								1			0	1
1	Maria Mateas (USA)								1			0	1
1	Rasheeda McAdoo (USA)								1			0	1
1	Andreea Mitu (ROU)								1			0	1
1	Akvilė Paražinskaitė (LTU)								1			0	1
1	Thaísa Grana Pedretti (BRA)								1			0	1
1	Ellen Perez (AUS)								1			0	1
1	Aleksandra Pospelova								1			0	1
1	Ganna Poznikhirenko (UKR)								1			0	1
1	Sydni Ratliff (USA)								1			0	1
1	Mell Reasco (ECU)								1			0	1
1	Erin Routliffe (NZL)								1			0	1
1	Yukina Saigo (JPN)								1			0	1
1	Ella Seidel (GER)								1			0	1
1	Sofia Shapatava (GEO)								1			0	1
1	Yana Sizikova								1			0	1
1	Marina Stakusic (CAN)								1			0	1
1	Fanny Stollár (HUN)								1			0	1
1	Katarína Strešnáková (SVK)								1			0	1
1	Arina Vasilescu (ROU)								1			0	1
1	Katherine Westbury (NZL)								1			0	1
1	Hind Abdelouahid (USA)										1	0	1
1	Monique Adamczak (AUS)										1	0	1
1	Jessica Luisa Alsola (CAN)										1	0	1
1	Candela Aparisi (ESP)										1	0	1
1	Fernanda Astete (CHI)										1	0	1
1	Catherine Aulia (AUS)										1	0	1
1	Humera Baharmus (IND)										1	0	1
1	Polina Bakhmutkina										1	0	1
1	Annelin Bakker (NED)										1	0	1
1	Irina Balus (SVK)										1	0	1
1	Monique Barry (NZL)										1	0	1
1	Yaroslava Bartashevich (FRA)										1	0	1
1	Amira Benaïssa (ALG)										1	0	1
1	Shrivalli Bhamidipaty (IND)										1	0	1
1	Smriti Bhasin (IND)										1	0	1
1	Berta Bonardi (ARG)										1	0	1
1	Jade Bornay (FRA)										1	0	1
1	Laura Böhner (GER)										1	0	1
1	Gabriella Broadfoot (RSA)										1	0	1
1	Flavie Brugnone (FRA)										1	0	1
1	Ana Candiotto (BRA)										1	0	1
1	Sai Samhitha Chamarthi (IND)										1	0	1
1	Chen Mengyi (CHN)										1	0	1
1	Lucía Cortez Llorca (ESP)										1	0	1
1	Giulia Crescenzi (ITA)										1	0	1
1	Kim Da-bin (KOR)										1	0	1
1	Gabriella Da Silva-Fick (AUS)										1	0	1
1	Samira De Stefano (ITA)										1	0	1
1	Iveta Dapkutė (LTU)										1	0	1
1	Līga Dekmeijere (LAT)										1	0	1
1	Katerina Dimitrova (BUL)										1	0	1
1	Katherine Duong (USA)										1	0	1
1	Salma Ewing (USA)										1	0	1
1	Aglaya Fedorova										1	0	1
1	Camilla Gennaro (ITA)										1	0	1
1	Jimar Geraldine Gerald González (CHI)										1	0	1
1	Victoria Gómez (ESP)										1	0	1
1	Alina Granwehr (SUI)										1	0	1
1	Sophia Graver (USA)										1	0	1
1	Kimmi Hance (USA)										1	0	1
1	Megan Heuser (USA)										1	0	1
1	Yuka Hosoki (JPN)										1	0	1
1	Chompoothip Jundakate (THA)										1	0	1
1	Nanari Katsumi (JPN)										1	0	1
1	Linda Klimovičová (CZE)										1	0	1
1	Nastja Kolar (SLO)										1	0	1
1	Eleni Kordolaimi (GRE)										1	0	1
1	Elena Korokozidi (GRE)										1	0	1
1	Júlia Konishi Camargo Silva (BRA)										1	0	1
1	Anet Angelika Koskel (EST)										1	0	1
1	Carolina Kuhl (GER)										1	0	1
1	Mia Kupres (CAN)										1	0	1
1	Miho Kuramochi (JPN)										1	0	1
1	Katarína Kužmová (SVK)										1	0	1
1	Louise Kwong (CAN)										1	0	1
1	Lee Eun-hye (KOR)										1	0	1
1	Emma Léné (FRA)										1	0	1
1	Sabastiani León (USA)										1	0	1
1	Lucía Llinares Domingo (ESP)										1	0	1
1	Noa Liauw a Fong (NED)										1	0	1
1	Emilie Lindh (GBR)										1	0	1
1	Matilde Mariani (ITA)										1	0	1
1	Lucía Marzal Martínez (ESP)										1	0	1
1	Nell Miller (GBR)										1	0	1
1	Sophie McDonald (AUS)										1	0	1
1	Brienne Minor (USA)										1	0	1
1	Tamachan Momkoonthod (THA)										1	0	1
1	Gabriella Mujan (NED)										1	0	1
1	Dong Na (CHN)										1	0	1
1	Anri Nagata (JPN)										1	0	1
1	Sofiia Nagornaia (ISR)										1	0	1
1	Nino Natsvlishvili (GEO)										1	0	1
1	Clervie Ngounoue (USA)										1	0	1
1	Malkia Ngounoue (USA)										1	0	1
1	Koharu Niimi (JPN)										1	0	1
1	Haine Ogata (JPN)										1	0	1
1	Angella Okutoyi (KEN)										1	0	1
1	Michika Ozeki (JPN)										1	0	1
1	Olga Parres Azcoitia (ESP)										1	0	1
1	Lucciana Pérez Alarcón (PER)										1	0	1
1	Viktoriya Petrenko (UKR)										1	0	1
1	Lucie Petruželová (CZE)										1	0	1
1	Manca Pislak (SLO)										1	0	1
1	Laetitia Pulchartová (CZE)										1	0	1
1	Lee So-ra (KOR)										1	0	1
1	Alisha Reayer (GBR)										1	0	1
1	Lexington Reed (USA)										1	0	1
1	Abigail Rencheli (MDA)										1	0	1
1	Lisa-Marie Rioux (JPN)										1	0	1
1	Stefania Rogozińska Dzik (POL)										1	0	1
1	Camila Romero (ECU)										1	0	1
1	Tiziana Rossini (ARG)										1	0	1
1	Katriin Saar (EST)										1	0	1
1	Aruzhan Sagandikova (KAZ)										1	0	1
1	Soha Sadiq (IND)										1	0	1
1	Antonia Samudio (COL)										1	0	1
1	Julita Saner (SWE)										1	0	1
1	Ana Filipa Santos (POR)										1	0	1
1	Hikaru Sato (JPN)										1	0	1
1	Riko Sawayanagi (JPN)										1	0	1
1	Anne Schäfer (GER)										1	0	1
1	Ruxandra Schech (GER)										1	0	1
1	Linda Ševčíková (CZE)										1	0	1
1	Darya Shauha										1	0	1
1	Eri Shimizu (JPN)										1	0	1
1	Sravya Shivani Chilakalapudi (IND)										1	0	1
1	Marine Szostak (FRA)										1	0	1
1	Shin Ji-ho (KOR)										1	0	1
1	Lian Tran (NED)										1	0	1
1	Joëlle Steur (GER)										1	0	1
1	Bunyawi Thamchaiwat (THA)										1	0	1
1	Mihaela Tsoneva (BUL)										1	0	1
1	Anna Ukolova										1	0	1
1	Sarah van Emst (NED)										1	0	1
1	Ani Vangelova (BUL)										1	0	1
1	Amelie Van Impe (BEL)										1	0	1
1	Hannah Viller Møller (DEN)										1	0	1
1	Xun Fangying (CHN)										1	0	1
1	Wang Meiling (CHN)										1	0	1
1	Kelly Williford (DOM)										1	0	1
1	Vanessa Wong (CAN)										1	0	1
1	Kseniya Yersh										1	0	1
1	Kisa Yoshioka (JPN)										1	0	1
1	Valeriya Yushchenko										1	0	1
1	Maria Toma (ROU)										1	1	1
1	Milana Zhabrailova										1	0	1
1	Amy Zhu (USA)										1	0	1
1	Jiang Zijun (CHN)										1	0	1

=== Titles won by nation ===
Updated as of 01 January

Total	Nation	W100		W80		W60		W25		W15		Total	
Total	Nation	S	D	S	D	S	D	S	D	S	D	S	D
122	United States (USA)	2	4	1	2	9	17	23	25	18	21	53	69
76	Japan (JPN)		1			4	2	7	24	14	24	25	51
59	Czech Republic (CZE)	3	2		1	4	11	13	11	4	11	24	35
54	France (FRA)	1	1			3	2	10	5	18	14	32	22
52	Spain (ESP)	1		2	2	4	5	14	12	6	6	27	25
50	China (CHN)	2				5	1	7	6	15	14	29	21
45	Germany (GER)					6	1	7	9	13	9	26	19
41	Italy (ITA)	1		1		4	5	3	5	9	13	18	23
41	Great Britain (GBR)		1		1	4	6	8	9	4	8	16	25
41	Chinese Taipei (TPE)						3	2	7	4	25	6	35
38	Australia (AUS)		1			2	4	9	15	3	4	14	24
37	Netherlands (NED)		2			1	5	5	11	3	10	9	28
35	Romania (ROU)	1		1		1	1	3	11	7	10	13	22
29	Switzerland (SUI)				1	2	5	2	5	5	9	9	20
26	Greece (GRE)						2		8	4	12	4	22
23	Belgium (BEL)	1			1	2	1	2	5	7	4	12	11
23	Serbia (SRB)						1	3	5	6	8	9	14
22	Ukraine (UKR)						5		9	3	5	3	19
21	Croatia (CRO)			1		4		7	4	3	2	15	6
21	India (IND)					1	2	2	7	2	7	5	16
20	Hungary (HUN)	1	3			3	1	4	4	1	3	9	11
18	Argentina (ARG)					1		2	2	7	6	10	8
17	Indonesia (INA)		1				3	2	4	3	4	5	12
16	Canada (CAN)	1				1	1	3	2	4	4	9	7
16	Russia (RUS) (Note: From 1 March, titles won by Russian players will not be counted towards Russia's tally.)					1	1	2	2	3	7	6	10
15	Portugal (POR)						1	1	9		4	1	14
15	Turkey (TUR)							5	1	2	7	7	8
14	Poland (POL)		1		2	1	2	2	5		1	3	11
14	South Korea (KOR)		1			1	2	2	3	2	3	5	9
14	Slovenia (SLO)						2	1	8		3	1	13
14	Hong Kong (HKG)						1	2	8	2	1	4	10
14	Sweden (SWE)							3	6	2	3	5	9
13	Thailand (THA)							1	6	2	4	3	10
12	Kazakhstan (KAZ)		2				2		5		3	0	12
12	Mexico (MEX)		1	1			2		2	3	3	4	8
12	Lithuania (LTU)						1	1	6		4	1	11
12	Chile (CHI)						1	1	5		5	1	11
11	Bulgaria (BUL)						1	2	1	1	6	3	8
9	Brazil (BRA)						2	1	4		2	1	8
8	Slovakia (SVK)						1		1	4	2	4	4
8	Denmark (DEN)							3		3	2	6	2
8	Colombia (COL)							1	1	1	5	2	6
8	New Zealand (NZL)								2	1	5	1	7
8	Egypt (EGY)									2	6	2	6
7	Austria (AUT)					2		3	1		1	5	2
7	Venezuela (VEN)						2		5			0	7
7	Georgia (GEO)						2		4		1	0	7
7	Latvia (LAT)							3	3		2	3	4
6	Finland (FIN)							1		2	3	3	3
6	Estonia (EST)								3	2	1	2	4
5	Peru (PER)										5	0	5
3	Algeria (ALG)						1			1	1	1	2
3	Uzbekistan (UZB)							2	1			2	1
3	Malta (MLT)								1	2		2	1
3	Belarus (BLR) (Note: From 1 March, titles won by Belorussian players will not be counted towards Belarus' tally.)									1	2	1	2
3	Ireland (IRL)										3	0	3
2	Andorra (AND)		1					1				1	1
2	Cyprus (CYP)					1		1				2	0
2	Norway (NOR)							1	1			1	1
2	Bolivia (BOL)								1	1		1	1
2	North Macedonia (MKD)								1	1		1	1
2	Ecuador (ECU)								1		1	0	2
2	Israel (ISR)								1		1	0	2
1	Montenegro (MNE)	1										1	0
1	Liechtenstein (LIE)					1						1	0
1	Burundi (BDI)						1					0	1
1	Philippines (PHI)							1				1	0
1	Bosnia and Herzegovina (BIH)								1			0	1
1	Guatemala (GTM)									1		1	0
1	Morocco (MAR)									1		1	0
1	Dominican Republic (DOM)										1	0	1
1	Kenya (KEN)										1	0	1
1	Moldova (MDA)										1	0	1
1	South Africa (RSA)										1	0	1

== See also ==
- 2022 WTA Tour
- 2022 WTA 125 tournaments
- 2022 ATP Challenger Tour
- 2022 ITF Men's World Tennis Tour
