= 2023 Pelham Racquet Club Pro Classic – Doubles =

Doubles
- 2023 Pelham Racquet Club Pro Classic

Final
- Champions: (United States) Makenna Jones (United States) Jamie Loeb
- Runners-up: (United States) Robin Anderson (Australia) Elysia Bolton
- Score: 6–4, 7–5

Events
| Singles | Doubles |
| ← 2022 · | Pelham Racquet Club Pro Classic | · 2024 → |

Carolyn Ansari and Ariana Arseneault were the defending champions but chose not to participate.

Makenna Jones and Jamie Loeb won the title, defeating Robin Anderson and Elysia Bolton in the final, 6–4, 7–5.

== Seeds ==
1. (United States) Makenna Jones / (United States) Jamie Loeb (champions)
2. (United States) Dalayna Hewitt / (United States) Anna Rogers (first round)
3. (United States) Allura Zamarripa / (United States) Maribella Zamarripa (first round, withdrew)
4. (United States) Jaeda Daniel / (United States) Rasheeda McAdoo (quarterfinals)

== Draw ==
=== Key ===
- Q = Qualifier
- WC = Wild card
- LL = Lucky loser
- Alt = Alternate
- SE = Special exempt
- PR = Protected ranking
- ITF = ITF entry
- JE = Junior exempt
- w/o = Walkover
- r = Retired
- d = Defaulted
- SR = Special ranking

First round
1 | (United States) M Jones (United States) J Loeb | 6 | 6
WC | (United States) A Guichard (United States) A Urhobo | 1 | 0
(Bulgaria) A Karatancheva (Bulgaria) L Karatancheva | 6 | 6
(United States) A Crump (Latvia) L Dekmeijere | 2 | 3
3 | (United States) A Zamarripa (United States) M Zamarripa
M Kononova; V Miroshnichenko | w/o
(Bulgaria) D Evtimova (Japan) A Okuno | 2 | 6 | [10]
(United States) A Markham (Slovakia) M Okáľová | 6 | 4 | [8]
(Argentina) B Bonardi (Mexico) J Hinojosa Gómez | 6^{4} | 6 | [10]
(United States) S Mohamad (United States) R Newborn | 7^{7} | 3 | [5]
(United States) M Schaefbauer (Dominican Republic) K Williford | 6 | 2 | [5]
4 | (United States) J Daniel (United States) R McAdoo | 4 | 6 | [10]
(United States) V Hu (Argentina) MS Krywoj | 6 | 6
(Nigeria) A Osabuohien (United States) B Walker | 1 | 2
(United States) R Anderson (Australia) E Bolton | 6 | 7
2 | (United States) D Hewitt (United States) A Rogers | 4 | 5

Quarterfinals
1 | (United States) M Jones (United States) J Loeb | 6 | 6
(Bulgaria) A Karatancheva (Bulgaria) L Karatancheva | 3 | 2
M Kononova; V Miroshnichenko | 6 | 6
(Bulgaria) D Evtimova (Japan) A Okuno | 3 | 3
(Argentina) B Bonardi (Mexico) J Hinojosa Gómez | 7 | 7^{8}
4 | (United States) J Daniel (United States) R McAdoo | 5 | 6^{6}
(United States) V Hu (Argentina) MS Krywoj | 4 | 2
(United States) R Anderson (Australia) E Bolton | 6 | 6

Semifinals
1 | (United States) M Jones (United States) J Loeb | 3 | 6 | [12]
M Kononova; V Miroshnichenko | 6 | 2 | [10]
(Argentina) B Bonardi (Mexico) J Hinojosa Gómez | 2 | 2
(United States) R Anderson (Australia) E Bolton | 6 | 6

Final
1 | (United States) M Jones (United States) J Loeb | 6 | 7
(United States) R Anderson (Australia) E Bolton | 4 | 5
