= 2023 Pelham Racquet Club Pro Classic =

Tennis tournament

- Date: 15–21 May 2023
- Edition: 19th
- Category: ITF Women's World Tennis Tour
- Prize money: $60,000
- Surface: Clay / Outdoor
- Location: Pelham, United States

Champions

Singles
- Veronika Miroshnichenko

Doubles
- (United States) Makenna Jones / (United States) Jamie Loeb
← 2022 ·	Pelham Racquet Club Pro Classic	· 2024 →

The 2023 Pelham Racquet Club Pro Classic was a professional tennis tournament played on outdoor clay courts. It was the nineteenth edition of the tournament, which was part of the 2023 ITF Women's World Tennis Tour. It took place in Pelham, Alabama, United States, between 15 and 21 May 2023.

== Champions ==
=== Singles ===
- Veronika Miroshnichenko def. (Mexico) Renata Zarazúa, 7–6^{(7–5)}, 6–2

=== Doubles ===
- (United States) Makenna Jones / (United States) Jamie Loeb def. (United States) Robin Anderson / (Australia) Elysia Bolton, 6–4, 7–5

== Singles main draw entrants ==
=== Seeds ===
Country	Player	Rank	Seed
MEX	Renata Zarazúa	244	1
USA	Robin Anderson	251	2
USA	Jamie Loeb	253	3
JPN	Yuki Naito	300	4
USA	Whitney Osuigwe	330	5
BRA	Gabriela Cé	336	6
USA	Grace Min	379	7
USA	Makenna Jones	383	8

- Rankings are as of 8 May 2023.

=== Other entrants ===
The following players received wildcards into the singles main draw:

- (United States) Jaeda Daniel
- (United States) Haley Giavara
- (United States) Kylie McKenzie
- (United States) Allura Zamarripa

The following players received entry from the qualifying draw:

- (United States) DJ Bennett
- (Mexico) Jessica Hinojosa Gómez
- Maria Kononova
- (Argentina) Melany Solange Krywoj
- (United States) Ava Markham
- (United States) Rasheeda McAdoo
- (Slovakia) Martina Okáľová
- (United States) Akasha Urhobo
