= 2022 Pelham Racquet Club Pro Classic – Doubles =

Doubles
- 2022 Pelham Racquet Club Pro Classic

Final
- Champions: (United States) Carolyn Ansari (Canada) Ariana Arseneault
- Runners-up: (United States) Reese Brantmeier (United States) Elvina Kalieva
- Score: 7–5, 6–1

Events
Singles	Doubles
← 2021 ·	Pelham Racquet Club Pro Classic	· 2023 →

Fernanda Contreras and Marcela Zacarías were the defending champions but chose not to participate.

Carolyn Ansari and Ariana Arseneault won the title, defeating Reese Brantmeier and Elvina Kalieva in the final, 7–5, 6–1.

== Seeds ==
1. (United States) Angela Kulikov / (United States) Rianna Valdes (semifinals)
2. (France) Tiphanie Fiquet / (Lithuania) Akvilė Paražinskaitė (first round)
3. (United States) Reese Brantmeier / (United States) Elvina Kalieva (final)
4. (Denmark) Olivia Gram / (South Korea) Park So-hyun (quarterfinals)

== Draw ==
=== Key ===
- Q = Qualifier
- WC = Wild card
- LL = Lucky loser
- Alt = Alternate
- SE = Special exempt
- PR = Protected ranking
- ITF = ITF entry
- JE = Junior exempt
- w/o = Walkover
- r = Retired
- d = Defaulted
- SR = Special ranking

=== Draw ===
First round
(Czech Republic) M Bayerlová (Germany) J Jebawy	7^{8}	2	[10]
(United States) J Kissell (United States) R Newborn	6^{6}	6	[2]
4	(Denmark) O Gram (South Korea) S-h Park	6	6
(United States) T Nix (United States) M Yamakita	2	1
(United States) C Ansari (Canada) A Arseneault	6	2	[10]
(United States) T Evans (United States) E Oosterhout	4	6	[7]
(United States) S Carrington (United States) D Hewitt	6	6
(Paraguay) N Escobar (United States) CE Henry	1	0
(Mexico) S Alcaraz (United States) B Collens	0	2
3	(United States) R Brantmeier (United States) E Kalieva	6	6
WC	(United States) S Buyckx (United States) A Despain	6	6
(United States) S Atturu (United States) Z Hitt	4	3
(India) S Balu; M Kononova	4	6	[11]
2	(France) T Fiquet (Lithuania) A Paražinskaitė	6	3	[9]

Quarterfinals
1	(United States) A Kulikov (United States) R Valdes	6	6
(Czech Republic) M Bayerlová (Germany) J Jebawy	2	2
4	(Denmark) O Gram (South Korea) S-h Park	3	6	[6]
(United States) C Ansari (Canada) A Arseneault	6	4	[10]
(United States) S Carrington (United States) D Hewitt	5	3
3	(United States) R Brantmeier (United States) E Kalieva	7	6
WC	(United States) S Buyckx (United States) A Despain	6	4	[3]
(India) S Balu; M Kononova	1	6	[10]

Semifinals
1	(United States) A Kulikov (United States) R Valdes	7	3	[4]
(United States) C Ansari (Canada) A Arseneault	5	6	[10]
3	(United States) R Brantmeier (United States) E Kalieva	6	6
(India) S Balu; M Kononova	4	4

Final
(United States) C Ansari (Canada) A Arseneault	7	6
3	(United States) R Brantmeier (United States) E Kalieva	5	1
