= 2022 Pelham Racquet Club Pro Classic – Singles =

Singles
- 2022 Pelham Racquet Club Pro Classic

Final
- Champion: (Argentina) María Lourdes Carlé
- Runner-up: (United States) Elvina Kalieva
- Score: 6–1, 6–1

Events
Singles	Doubles
← 2021 ·	Pelham Racquet Club Pro Classic	· 2023 →

Panna Udvardy was the defending champion but chose to compete at the 2022 Grand Prix SAR La Princesse Lalla Meryem instead.

María Lourdes Carlé won the title, defeating Elvina Kalieva in the final, 6–1, 6–1.

== Seeds ==
1. (Argentina) María Lourdes Carlé (champion)
2. (United States) Elvina Kalieva (final)
3. (United States) Whitney Osuigwe (second round)
4. (United States) Elizabeth Mandlik (second round)
5. (United States) Ellie Douglas (second round)
6. (South Korea) Park So-hyun (second round)
7. (United States) Katrina Scott (quarterfinals)
8. (United States) Ashlyn Krueger (semifinals)

== Draw ==
=== Key ===
- Q = Qualifier
- WC = Wild card
- LL = Lucky loser
- Alt = Alternate
- SE = Special exempt
- PR = Protected ranking
- ITF = ITF entry
- JE = Junior exempt
- w/o = Walkover
- r = Retired
- d = Defaulted
- SR = Special ranking

=== Finals ===
Semifinals
1	(Argentina) María Lourdes Carlé	6	6
8	(United States) Ashlyn Krueger	3	1
(United States) Erica Oosterhout	4	7^{7}	2
2	(United States) Elvina Kalieva	6	6^{5}	6

Final
1	(Argentina) María Lourdes Carlé	6	6
2	(United States) Elvina Kalieva	1	1

=== Top half ===
First round
1	(Argentina) ML Carlé	6	2	6
WC	(United States) T Evans	3	6	0
WC	(United States) J Thompson	2	6	2
WC	(United States) M Schaefbauer	6	3	6
Q	(United States) R Newborn	2	6	7
(United States) T Kinard	6	1	5
Q	(Canada) A Arseneault	2	1
7	(United States) K Scott	6	6
4	(United States) E Mandlik	6	6
Q	(Spain) A Sanz Llaneza Fernández	1	2
(United States) C Lampl	7^{7}	6
Q	(Canada) C Brace	6^{5}	3
Q	(Latvia) L Dekmeijere	1	3
(Czech Republic) M Bayerlová	6	6
WC	(United States) A Graham	1	4
8	(United States) A Krueger	6	6

Second round
1	(Argentina) ML Carlé	6	6
WC	(United States) M Schaefbauer	4	3
Q	(United States) R Newborn	2	1
7	(United States) K Scott	6	6
4	(United States) E Mandlik	2	2
(United States) C Lampl	6	6
(Czech Republic) M Bayerlová	1	3
8	(United States) A Krueger	6	6

Quarterfinals
1	(Argentina) ML Carlé	1	6	6
7	(United States) K Scott	6	3	0
(United States) C Lampl	3	1
8	(United States) A Krueger	6	6

Semifinals
1	(Argentina) ML Carlé	6	6
8	(United States) A Krueger	3	1

=== Bottom half ===
First round
5	(United States) E Douglas	6	6
Q	M Kononova	2	1
J Kolodynska	6	6
Q	(United States) J Kissell	3	2
(France) T Fiquet	4	3
(United States) E Oosterhout	6	6
(United States) R Brantmeier	6	4	4
3	(United States) W Osuigwe	4	6	6
7	(South Korea) S-h Park	5	6	6
(Lithuania) A Paražinskaitė	7	3	2
(Mexico) M Portillo Ramírez	6	0	4
(United States) H Giavara	4	6	6
(United States) D Hewitt	4	5
Q	(United States) C Ansari	6	7
(Germany) J Jebawy	2	0
2	(United States) E Kalieva	6	6

Second round
5	(United States) E Douglas	4	0
J Kolodynska	6	6
(United States) E Oosterhout	6	6
3	(United States) W Osuigwe	3	3
7	(South Korea) S-h Park	3	3
(United States) H Giavara	6	6
Q	(United States) C Ansari	4	3
2	(United States) E Kalieva	6	6

Quarterfinals
J Kolodynska	4	6	1
(United States) E Oosterhout	6	4	6
(United States) H Giavara	2	4
2	(United States) E Kalieva	6	6

Semifinals
(United States) E Oosterhout	4	7^{7}	2
2	(United States) E Kalieva	6	6^{5}	6
