= Miroshnichenko =

Miroshnichenko (Ukrainian: Мірошніченко, Russian: Мирошниченко) Miroshnychenko (Ukrainian: Мірошниченко, or Mirashnichenka (Belarusian: Мірашнічэнка) is a surname of Ukrainian origin. It is a patronymic surname literally meaning "son of miller (miroshnyk)". The surname may refer to the following notable people:

- Aleksandr Miroshnichenko (1964–2003), Kazakhstani boxer
- Anastasiya Miroshnichenko (born 2004), Uzbek artistic gymnast.
- Andrei Miroshnichenko (born 1968), Kazakhstani professional football coach
- Artem Miroshnychenko (born 1994), Ukrainian football midfielder
- Denys Miroshnichenko (born 1994), Ukrainian football midfielder
- Dmitry Miroshnichenko (born 1992), Kazakh football defender
- Eugene Miroshnichenko, Russian/Ukrainian literature critic, historian, and journalist
- Evgeniya Miroshnichenko (1931–2009), Ukrainian opera and chamber singer
- Evgenij Miroshnichenko (born 1978), Ukrainian chess Grandmaster
- Ihor Miroshnychenko (born 1976), Ukrainian journalist and politician
- Irina Miroshnichenko (1942–2023), Russian actress
- Ivan Miroshnichenko (disambiguation), multiple people
- Liana Mirashnichenka (born 1988), Belarusian football midfielder
- Oleksandr Miroshnychenko (born 1986), Ukrainian football midfielder
- Roman Miroshnichenko (born 1977), Russian virtuoso guitarist, composer, and band leader
- Sergei Miroshnichenko (disambiguation), multiple people
- Timur Miroshnychenko (born 1986), Ukrainian TV presenter
- Veronika Miroshnichenko (born 1997), Russian tennis player
- Viktor Miroshnichenko (1959–2025), Soviet-Ukrainian boxer

== See also ==
- Miroshnychenko
