= 2022 Pelham Racquet Club Pro Classic =

Tennis tournament

- Date: 16–22 May 2022
- Edition: 18th
- Category: ITF Women's World Tennis Tour
- Prize money: $60,000
- Surface: Clay / Outdoor
- Location: Pelham, Alabama, United States

Champions

Singles
- (Argentina) María Lourdes Carlé

Doubles
- (United States) Carolyn Ansari / (Canada) Ariana Arseneault
← 2021 ·	Pelham Racquet Club Pro Classic	· 2023 →

The 2022 Pelham Racquet Club Pro Classic was a professional tennis tournament played on outdoor clay courts. It was the eighteenth edition of the tournament which was part of the 2022 ITF Women's World Tennis Tour. It took place in Pelham, Alabama, United States between 16 and 22 May 2022.

== Singles main draw entrants ==
=== Seeds ===
Country	Player	Rank^{1}	Seed
ARG	María Lourdes Carlé	247	1
USA	Elvina Kalieva	294	2
USA	Whitney Osuigwe	315	3
USA	Elizabeth Mandlik	316	4
USA	Ellie Douglas	339	5
KOR	Park So-hyun	358	6
USA	Katrina Scott	391	7
USA	Ashlyn Krueger	422	8

- ^{1} Rankings are as of 9 May 2022.

=== Other entrants ===
The following players received wildcards into the singles main draw:

- (United States) Tatum Evans
- (United States) Alexa Graham
- (United States) McKenna Schaefbauer
- (United States) Jenna Thompson

The following players received entry from the qualifying draw:

- (United States) Carolyn Ansari
- (Canada) Ariana Arseneault
- (Canada) Cadence Brace
- (Latvia) Līga Dekmeijere
- (United States) Joelle Kissell
- Maria Kononova
- (United States) Rhiann Newborn
- (Spain) Almudena Sanz Llaneza Fernández

== Champions ==
=== Singles ===
- (Argentina) María Lourdes Carlé def. (United States) Elvina Kalieva, 6–1, 6–1

=== Doubles ===
- (United States) Carolyn Ansari / (Canada) Ariana Arseneault def. (United States) Reese Brantmeier / (United States) Elvina Kalieva 7–5, 6–1
