= Igor Kolb =

Belarusian-born ballet dancer

Igor Kolb (born June 6, 1977, in Pinsk, Byelorussian SSR, Soviet Union) is a principal dancer of Mariinsky Ballet.

== Career ==
He graduated Byelorussia State Ballet School, and joined Mariinsky ballet in 1996. He became a soloist in 1998, and promoted to principal dancer in 2003. He made his debut at the Rome Opera in Rudolf Nureyev's version of Sleeping Beauty in 2002, and in 2006 he made his debut at the Wiener Staatsoper in Rudolf Nureyev's version of Swan Lake. Igor Kolb left Mariinsky Ballet in 2022 for heading the Bolshoi Theatre of Belarus (Minsk) ballet in position of Principal Ballet Master.

== Repertoire ==
- pas de trois in Swan Lake (Petipa-Ivanov, staged by Sergeyev)
- Prince Désiré in The Sleeping Beauty (Petipa, staged by K. Sergeyev) (1997)
- soloist (cr.) in Les Noces (Miroshnichenko) (1997)
- the Poet in Chopiniana (Michel Fokine) (1997)
- troubadour in Romeo and Juliet (Lavrovsky) (1997)
- Vaslav in The Fountain of Bakhchisarai (Zakharov)
- James in La Sylphide
- Albrecht in Giselle (Coralli/Perrot, Petipa)
- Berange in Raymonda (Sergeyev)
- the Prince in The Nutcracker (Vainonen)
- soloist in 1st movement of Symphony in C (Balanchine) (1998)
- soloist in Tchaikovsky Pas de Deux (Balanchine)
- soloist in Paquita Grand Pas (Petipa)
- Prince Désiré in The Sleeping Beauty (Petipa, staged by Vikharev) (1999)
- Prince Siegfried in Swan Lake (Petipa-Ivanov, staged by K. Sergeyev) (2000)
- Ali in Le Corsaire (Gusev after Petipa) (2001)
- soloist in Le Spectre de la Rose (Fokine)
- Prince Désiré in The Sleeping Beauty (Chalmer after Petipa) (Rome Opera Ballet, 2002)
- Solor in La Bayadère (Petipa, staged by Ponomarev, Chabukiani) (2002)
- Solor in La Bayadère (Petipa, staged by Vikharev) (2002)
- Ferkhad in The Legend of Love (Grigorovich)
- Romeo in Romeo and Juliet (Lavrovsky)
- Apollon in Apollon (Balanchine)
- soloist in Scotch Symphony (Balanchine)
- soloist in 1st Movement of Symphony in C (Balanchine)
- soloist in Diamonds from Jewels (Balanchine)
- soloist in Ballet Imperial-Tchaikovsky Piano Concerto #2 (Balanchine)
- soloist in In the Middle, Somewhat Elevated (Forsythe)
- soloist in Steptext (Forsythe)
- 2nd duet in In the Night (Robbins)
- The Prince in Cinderella (Ratmansky)
- soloist in Leningrad Symphony (Belsky)
- Cleonte in Le Bourgeois gentilhomme
- soloist in Le Papillion
- soloist in Bakhti (Bejart)
- soloist in Sense of Moon
- Golden slave in Scheherazade (Fokine)
- soloist in Middle Duet (Ratmansky)
- Cecchetti in Pavlova and Cecchetti (Neumeier)
- Le Chevalier des Grieux Manon (MacMillan)
- soloist in Swan (R. Poklitaru)
- soloist in Malachi (2007)
- Abderakhman in Raymonda (2007)
- Basil in Don Quixote (2008)
- soloist in Pierrot Lunnaire (2008)

== Awards ==
- Vaganova Prix (1995)
- Vaganova Prix (1996)

== See also ==
- List of Russian ballet dancers
