= 2023 Pelham Racquet Club Pro Classic – Singles =

Singles
- 2023 Pelham Racquet Club Pro Classic

Final
- Champion: Veronika Miroshnichenko
- Runner-up: (Mexico) Renata Zarazúa
- Score: 7–6^{(7–5)}, 6–2

Events
Singles	Doubles
← 2022 ·	Pelham Racquet Club Pro Classic	· 2024 →

María Lourdes Carlé was the defending champion but chose not to participate.

Veronika Miroshnichenko won the title, defeating Renata Zarazúa in the final, 7–6^{(7–5)}, 6–2.

== Seeds ==
1. (Mexico) Renata Zarazúa (final)
2. (United States) Robin Anderson (semifinals)
3. (United States) Jamie Loeb (semifinals)
4. (Japan) Yuki Naito (first round)
5. (United States) Whitney Osuigwe (quarterfinals)
6. (Brazil) Gabriela Cé (quarterfinals)
7. (United States) Grace Min (quarterfinals)
8. (United States) Makenna Jones (second round)

== Draw ==
=== Key ===
- Q = Qualifier
- WC = Wild card
- LL = Lucky loser
- Alt = Alternate
- ITF = ITF entry
- PR = Protected ranking
- SR = Special ranking
- SE = Special exempt
- JE = Junior exempt
- JR = Junior Accelerator Programme entrant
- CO = College Accelerator Programme entrant
- NG = Next Gen Accelerator Program entrant
- w/o = Walkover
- r = Retired
- d = Defaulted

=== Finals ===
Semifinals
1	(Mexico) Renata Zarazúa	6	6
3	(United States) Jamie Loeb	4	3
Veronika Miroshnichenko	6	7^{7}
2	(United States) Robin Anderson	2	6^{3}

Final
1	(Mexico) Renata Zarazúa	6^{5}	2
Veronika Miroshnichenko	7^{7}	6

=== Top half ===
First round
1	(Mexico) R Zarazúa	6	6
Q	(Mexico) J Hinojosa Gómez	2	2
Q	(United States) R McAdoo	6	6
(Canada) C Brace	4	4
(United States) V Hu	6	6
Q	(Argentina) MS Krywoj	1	0
(Austria) T Paszek	0	6	6^{5}
8	(United States) M Jones	6	2	7^{7}
3	(United States) J Loeb	6	6
Q	(United States) A Urhobo	2	4
Q	M Kononova	6	6
(United States) K Shaffer	4	3
(Argentina) B Bonardi	6	5	6
(Bulgaria) D Evtimova	3	7	4
(Bulgaria) L Karatancheva	0	0
7	(United States) G Min	6	6

Second round
1	(Mexico) R Zarazúa	6	6
Q	(United States) R McAdoo	0	0
(United States) V Hu	6	6
8	(United States) M Jones	2	1
3	(United States) J Loeb	6	3	6
Q	M Kononova	4	6	1
(Argentina) B Bonardi	1	1
7	(United States) G Min	6	6

Quarterfinals
1	(Mexico) R Zarazúa	6	6
(United States) V Hu	4	4
3	(United States) J Loeb	6	7
7	(United States) G Min	2	5

Semifinals
1	(Mexico) R Zarazúa	6	6
3	(United States) J Loeb	4	3

=== Bottom half ===
First round
6	(Brazil) G Cé	6	6
D Kudashova	3	4
Q	(Slovakia) M Okáľová	6	4	2
(United States) A Rogers	2	6	6
Q	(United States) DJ Bennett	6	6
(Australia) E Bolton	3	3
V Miroshnichenko	4	6	6
4	(Japan) Y Naito	6	3	2
5	(United States) W Osuigwe	6	7
WC	(United States) H Giavara	0	5
(United States) D Hewitt	6^{5}	3
WC	(United States) A Zamarripa	7^{7}	6
WC	(United States) J Daniel	6^{2}	6	6
WC	(United States) K McKenzie	7^{7}	2	2
Q	(United States) A Markham	6	3	4
2	(United States) R Anderson	3	6	6

Second round
6	(Brazil) G Cé	6	6
(United States) A Rogers	4	3
Q	(United States) DJ Bennett	4	4
V Miroshnichenko	6	6
5	(United States) W Osuigwe	6	6
WC	(United States) A Zamarripa	2	4
WC	(United States) J Daniel	6^{6}	3
2	(United States) R Anderson	7^{8}	6

Quarterfinals
6	(Brazil) G Cé	6^{7}	6	6^{5}
V Miroshnichenko	7^{9}	4	7^{7}
5	(United States) W Osuigwe	3	2
2	(United States) R Anderson	6	6

Semifinals
V Miroshnichenko	6	7^{7}
2	(United States) R Anderson	2	6^{3}
