= Ivan Miroshnichenko =

Ivan Miroshnichenko may refer to:

- Ivan Miroshnichenko (politician)
- Ivan Miroshnichenko (ice hockey)
