= Amira Benaïssa =

French-born Algerian footballer (born 2007)

Personal information
- Date of birth: 26 July 2007 (age 19)
- Place of birth: Nanterre, France
- Height: 1.81 m (5 ft 11 in)
- Position: Goalkeeper

Team information
- Current team: Fleury
- Number: 40

Youth career
- 2016–2024: Racing Club
- 2024–2025: Fleury

Senior career*
Years	Team	Apps	(Gls)
2025–	Fleury	0	(0)

International career^{‡}
2025–	Algeria	3	(0)
- * Club domestic league appearances and goals as of 16 October 2026 ‡ National team caps and goals as of 16 October 2026

Amira Benaïssa (Arabic: أميرة بنعيسى, pronounced [aˈmiː.ra bin.ʕiː.sa]; born 26 July 2007) is a professional footballer who plays as a goalkeeper for Première Ligue club Fleury. Born in France, she plays for the Algeria national team.

== Early life ==
Benaïssa was born on 26 July 2007 in Nanterre, Hauts-de-Seine, Île-de-France, France. She is of Algerian descent, being born to an Algerian mother from Maghnia in Tlemcen Province and a French father of Algerian descent.

Benaïssa began her youth career at Racing Club in 2016, where she won Racingwoman of the Year in 2021 before joining Fleury's academy in 2024. Growing up, she admired men's footballer Raïs M'Bolhi, who like her was born in France to an Algerian family and played as a goalkeeper for Algeria.

== Club career ==
=== Fleury ===
After spending time in the under-19 academy setup, Benaïssa was brought into the first team of Première Ligue club Fleury in the 2025–26 season. However, she did not play any games.

Ahead of the 2026–27 season, Benaïssa signed her first professional contract with the club, signing a three-year deal until 2029.

== International career ==
Having the option to represent either France (her country of birth) or Algeria (through her heritage), she opted to play for Algeria, despite being encouraged by the staff at her club Fleury to choose France. She was never approached by the French Football Federation (FFF) due to fierce competition in the squad and her injuries.

=== Algeria ===
Benaïssa received her first call-up for Algeria when she was selected by French manager Farid Benstiti as part of a 26-player squad for a two-match friendly series against Kenya on 26 and 30 November 2025 at the Sidi Moussa National Technical Centre in Sidi Moussa, Algeria. She was an unused substitute in the first match, which ended in a 2–1 victory for Algeria. In the second match, she made her international début in what ended in a 1–1 draw.

Benaïssa received her first tournament call-up when she was named as part of Benstiti's 26-player squad for the 2026 Women's Africa Cup of Nations (WAFCON) in Morocco. Algeria qualified for the 2027 FIFA Women's World Cup in Brazil through the tournament, their first ever qualification for the tournament. They then went on to finish in third place, their best ever finish at the tournament. However, she did not feature in any of Algeria's matches.

== Career statistics ==
As of 16 October 2026

=== Club ===
Appearances and goals by club, season and competition
Club	Season	League			Domestic cup			League cup			Total	
Club	Season	Division	Apps	Goals	Cup	Apps	Goals	Cup	Apps	Goals	Apps	Goals
Fleury	2025–26	Première Ligue	0	0	Coupe de France Féminine	0	0	Coupe LFFP	0	0	0	0
Fleury	2026–27	Première Ligue	0	0	Coupe de France Féminine	0	0	Coupe LFFP	0	0	0	0
Fleury	Total		0	0	Total	0	0	Total	0	0	0	0
Career total			0	0	Total	0	0	Total	0	0	0	0

=== International ===
Appearances and goals by national team and year
National team	Year	Apps	Goals
Algeria	2025	1	0
Algeria	2026	2	0
Total		3	0

== Honours ==
Algeria

- Women's Africa Cup of Nations

Third place: 2026
