= Sergei Miroshnichenko =

Sergei Miroshnichenko may refer to:

- Sergei Miroshnichenko (director), Russian documentary filmmaker
- Sergei Miroshnichenko (ice hockey), Kazakhstani hockey player
- Sergei Miroshnichenko (footballer) Russian footballer
