= Vainonen =

Vainonen is a Finnish surname. Notable people with the surname include:

- Leo Vainonen (born 1952), Swedish boxer
- Mikko Vainonen (born 1994), Finnish ice hockey player
- Vasili Vainonen (1901–1964), Russian choreographer
