= Pelham Racquet Club Pro Classic =

- 2022 Pelham Racquet Club Pro Classic

ITF Women's Tour
- Event name: Pelham Racquet Club Pro Classic
- Location: Pelham, Alabama, United States
- Venue: Pelham Racquet Club
- Category: ITF Women's World Tennis Tour
- Surface: Clay / outdoor
- Draw: 32S/32Q/16D
- Prize money: $60,000

The Pelham Racquet Club Pro Classic is a tournament for professional female tennis players played on outdoor clay courts. The event is classified as a $60,000 ITF Women's World Tennis Tour tournament and has been held in Pelham, Alabama, United States, since 2004.

== Past finals ==
=== Singles ===
Year	Champion	Runner-up	Score
2026	(United States) Madison Brengle	(United States) Katrina Scott	6–1, 6–4
2025	(Romania) Gabriela Lee	(United States) Robin Anderson	6–3, 6–1
2024	Not Held		
2023	Veronika Miroshnichenko	(Mexico) Renata Zarazúa	7–6^{(7–5)}, 6–2
2022	(Argentina) María Carlé	(United States) Elvina Kalieva	6–1, 6–1
2021	(Hungary) Panna Udvardy	(United States) Jamie Loeb	6–7^{(5–7)}, 6–4, 6–3
2020	Tournament cancelled due to the COVID-19 pandemic		
2019	(Czech Republic) Barbora Krejčíková	(United States) Caroline Dolehide	6–4, 6–3
2018	(Poland) Iga Świątek	(United States) Allie Kiick	6–2, 6–0
2017	(Norway) Ulrikke Eikeri	(United States) Usue Maitane Arconada	7–5, 6–2
2016	(United States) Grace Min	(United States) Bernarda Pera	6–4, 6–4
2015	(Ukraine) Anhelina Kalinina	(Germany) Laura Siegemund	6–3, 7–5
2014	(Germany) Laura Siegemund	(Kazakhstan) Yulia Putintseva	6–1, 6–4
2013	(Colombia) Mariana Duque Mariño	(Japan) Kurumi Nara	1–6, 6–3, 6–4
2012	(Canada) Heidi El Tabakh	(Romania) Edina Gallovits-Hall	3–6, 6–2, 6–4
2011	(New Zealand) Marina Erakovic	(Czech Republic) Renata Voráčová	6–4, 2–6, 6–1
2010	(Romania) Edina Gallovits	(Croatia) Ajla Tomljanović	6–2, 6–0
2009	(Paraguay) Rossana de los Ríos	(Argentina) Jorgelina Cravero	6–4, 6–1
2008	(United States) Raquel Kops-Jones	(Paraguay) Rossana de los Ríos	6–3, 6–4
2007	(Romania) Edina Gallovits	(Germany) Gréta Arn	6–3, 7–5
2006	(Russia) Vasilisa Bardina	(Romania) Anda Perianu	6–1, 6–4
2005	(Argentina) Soledad Esperón	(Canada) Aleksandra Wozniak	7–5, 6–2
2004	(Slovakia) Zuzana Zemenová	(Russia) Olga Puchkova	4–6, 6–4, 6–0

=== Doubles ===
Year	Champions	Runners-up	Score
2026	(Spain) Alicia Herrero Liñana (United States) Anna Rogers	(United States) Kaitlyn Carnicella (United States) Capucine Jauffret	6–2, 6–1
2025	(United Kingdom) Madeleine Brooks (Australia) Petra Hule	(Spain) Alicia Herrero Liñana (United States) Anna Rogers	6–1, 7–6^{(7–4)}
2024	Not Held		
2023	(United States) Makenna Jones (United States) Jamie Loeb	(United States) Robin Anderson (Australia) Elysia Bolton	6–4, 7–5
2022	(United States) Carolyn Ansari (Canada) Ariana Arseneault	(United States) Reese Brantmeier (United States) Elvina Kalieva	7–5, 6–1
2021	(Mexico) Fernanda Contreras (Mexico) Marcela Zacarías	(Japan) Erina Hayashi (Japan) Kanako Morisaki	6–0, 6–3
2020	Tournament cancelled due to the COVID-19 pandemic		
2019	(United States) Usue Maitane Arconada (United States) Caroline Dolehide	(Romania) Oana Georgeta Simion (Romania) Gabriela Talabă	6–3, 6–0
2018	(Chile) Alexa Guarachi (New Zealand) Erin Routliffe	(United States) Maria Mateas (Mexico) María Portillo Ramírez	6–1, 6–2
2017	(United States) Emina Bektas (United States) Sanaz Marand	(United Kingdom) Amanda Carreras (Croatia) Tena Lukas	Walkover
2016	(United States) Asia Muhammad (United States) Taylor Townsend	(United States) Sophie Chang (United States) Caitlin Whoriskey	6–2, 6–3
2015	Doubles competition abandoned due to poor weather		
2014	(United States) Danielle Lao (United States) Keri Wong	(Bulgaria) Dia Evtimova (Belarus) Ilona Kremen	1–6, 6–4, [10–7]
2013	(Australia) Ashleigh Barty (Russia) Arina Rodionova	(Chinese Taipei) Kao Shao-yuan (Chinese Taipei) Lee Hua-chen	6–4, 6–2
2012	(France) Julie Coin (Canada) Marie-Ève Pelletier	(Russia) Elena Bovina (Russia) Ekaterina Bychkova	7–5, 6–4
2011	(Latvia) Līga Dekmeijere (Canada) Marie-Ève Pelletier	(United States) Kimberly Couts (Canada) Heidi El Tabakh	2–6, 6–4, [12–10]
2010	(United States) Mallory Cecil (United States) Jamie Hampton	(Chinese Taipei) Chan Chin-wei (Australia) Nicole Kriz	6–4, 6–3
2009	(Netherlands) Daniëlle Harmsen (Netherlands) Kim Kilsdonk	(Canada) Marie-Ève Pelletier (Portugal) Frederica Piedade	6–4, 5–7, [11–9]
2008	(Czech Republic) Michaela Paštiková (United States) Ahsha Rolle	(South Korea) Lee Ye-ra (Japan) Remi Tezuka	7–5, 6–2
2007	(United States) Carly Gullickson (Australia) Nicole Kriz	(Czech Republic) Michaela Paštiková (Czech Republic) Hana Šromová	6–2, 2–6, 6–0
2006	(Ukraine) Tetiana Luzhanska (Indonesia) Romana Tedjakusuma	(United States) Tiffany Dabek (South Africa) Chanelle Scheepers	6–4, 6–1
2005	(Slovakia) Kristína Michalaková (Ukraine) Tetiana Luzhanska	(United States) Raquel Kops-Jones (United States) Kristen Schlukebir	7–6^{(7–2)}, 6–4
2004	(Latvia) Līga Dekmeijere (Belarus) Natallia Dziamidzenka	(United States) Sarah Riske (United States) Aleke Tsoubanos	6–3, 6–1
