= Ivan Miroshnichenko (politician) =

Ukrainian politician (born 1972)

Ivan Miroshnichenko Іван Мірошніченко
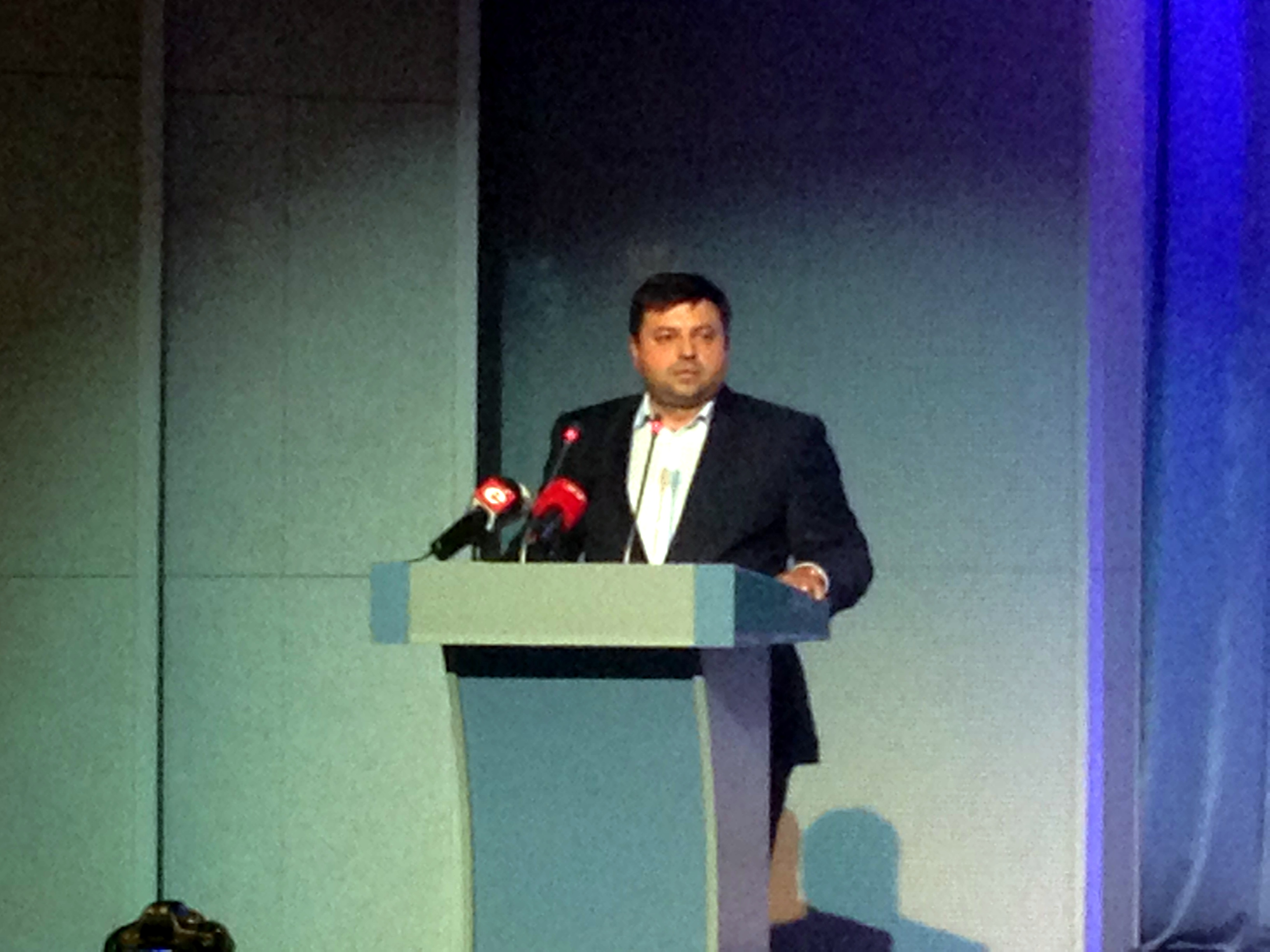
- In office 27 November 2014 – 29 August 2019

Personal details
- Born: August 29, 1972 (age 54) Vesele, Oleksadriya district, Kirovohrad oblast
- Education: Kyiv National Agrarian University

Ivan Volodymyrovych Miroshnichenko (Ukrainian: Іван Володимирович Мірошніченко, born August 29, 1972) is a Ukrainian politician, former Member of Parliament of Ukraine of the 8th convocation, member of the parliamentary faction Samopomich Union, expert in agrarian field.

Miroshnichenko again took part in the July 2019 Ukrainian parliamentary election, this time as number 4 on the election list of the party Strength and Honor. But in the election the party won 3.82%, not enough to clear the 5% election threshold and thus no parliamentary seats.

== Biography ==
Ivan Miroshnichenko was born in Vesele, Oleksadriya district, Kirovohrad oblast. He attended school and college in Oleksandriya. In 1996 he graduated with honours from Kyiv National Agrarian University, specialising in International Economy. In 1994 he studied at Purdue University Business School, West Lafayette, Indiana, USA.

Miroshnichenko has worked in agrarian business, he was the CEO of Interagro Ukraine (1996-1997), vice-president of Cargill (1997-2008), CEO and Director for Black Sea region at Noble Group. Ivan Miroshnichenko has been the Vice President of the NGO Ukrainian Grain Association since 2005. He was the Head of the Observing Council at the Ukrainian Futures Stock Exchange, freelance counsellor of the Prime Minister of Ukraine (2009-2010), permanent representative of the companies Cargil and Noble Resources Ukraine at the Agrarian Committee of the American Chamber of Commerce and the co-chair of the committee in 2003-2005 and 2010-2013. He was the Member of the Committee on the Coordination of the Grain Market at the Cabinet of Ministers of Ukraine; member of the Coordinating Council at the State Tax Service of Ukraine in 2008-2010. Member of the working group on the agrarian markets at the Ministry of Agrarian Policies (2007-2009). Counsellor of the Ministry for the Agrarian Policies in 2009-2013.

He has been distinguished by following decorations: Medal of the Ministry for the Agrarian Policies 'For Excellent Services'; Prime-Minister's diploma (2012); The award 'Person of the year' in the nomination 'Agrarian professional of the year' (2011).

Miroshnichenko is fluent in English. He is married and is the father to Daniil Miroshnichenko, currently a student in the United States along with two other children.
