= Elvina Kalieva =

American tennis player (born 2003)

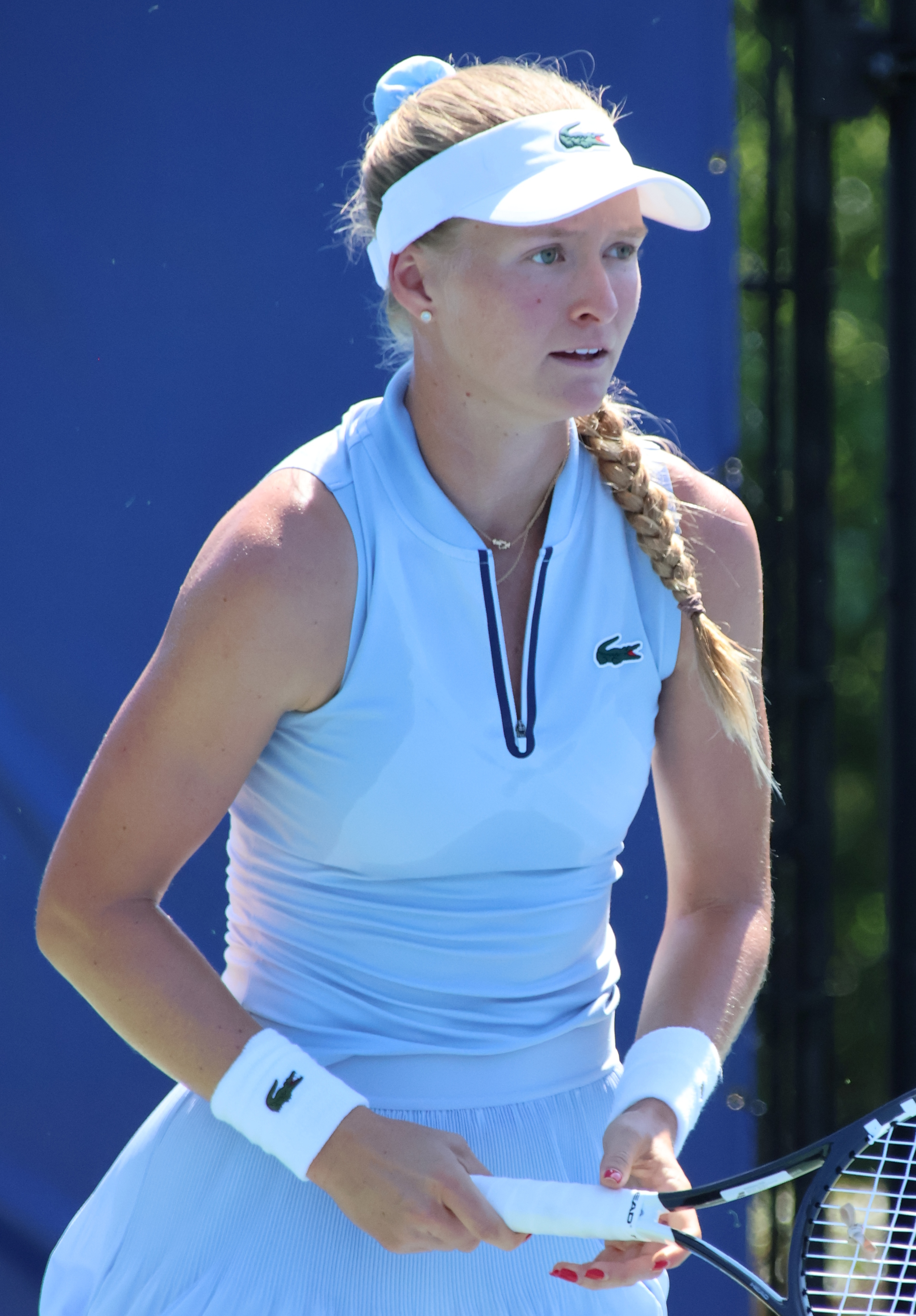
- Kalieva in 2026
- Country (sports): United States
- Born: July 27, 2003 (age 23) Brooklyn, New York
- Plays: Right-handed
- Prize money: $897,886

Singles
- Career record: 215–187
- Career titles: 3 ITF
- Highest ranking: No. 111 (October 26, 2026)
- Current ranking: No. 111 (October 26, 2026)

Grand Slam singles results
- Australian Open: Q3 (2026)
- French Open: Q1 (2024, 2026)
- Wimbledon: Q2 (2026)
- US Open: 1R (2026)

Doubles
- Career record: 60–48
- Career titles: 4 ITF
- Highest ranking: No. 194 (February 6, 2023)
- Current ranking: No. 522 (October 12, 2026)

Grand Slam mixed doubles results
- US Open: 1R (2021)
- Last updated on: October 15, 2026.

Elvina Kalieva (Russian: Эльвина Калиев; (born July 27, 2003) is an American tennis player. Kalieva has a career-high singles ranking by the WTA of No. 111, achieved on October 26, 2026. She also has a career-high WTA doubles ranking of No. 194, reached in February 2023.

== Personal life ==
She is the younger sister of Ottawa Senators forward Arthur Kaliyev.

== Career highlights ==
=== 2015: Juniors ===
Kalieva earned her first USTA Gold Ball at the Girls 12s National Clay Court Championships in 2015.

=== 2017–2021: Pro beginnings ===
Kalieva made her Grand Slam tournament main draw debut at the 2021 US Open, after receiving a wildcard for the mixed doubles event with Bruno Kuzuhara.

=== 2022–2023: WTA Tour and WTA 1000 debuts ===
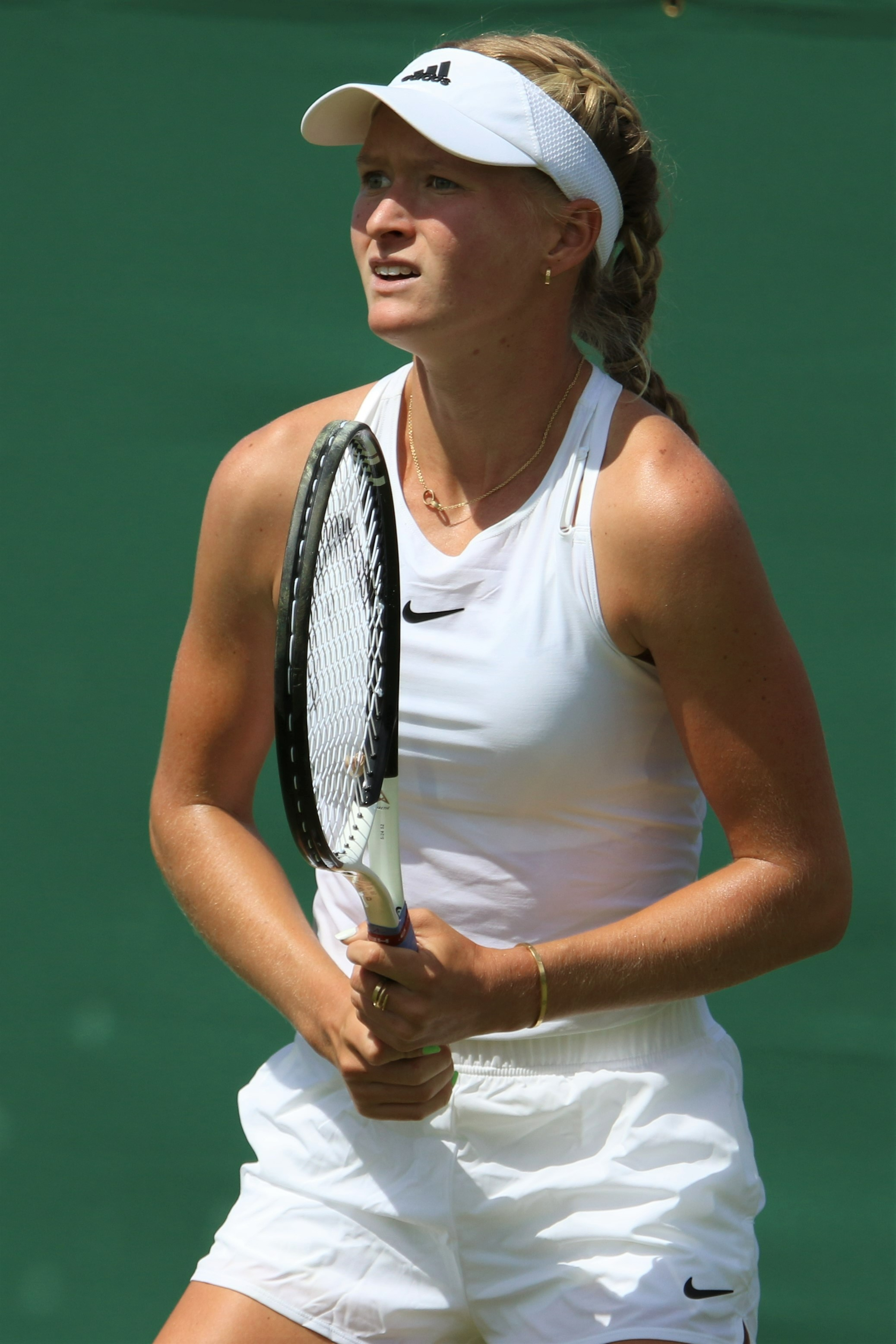
Kalieva at the 2022 Wimbledon Championships

The following year, she made her WTA Tour and WTA 1000 debuts at the 2022 Indian Wells Open as a wildcard, losing in the first round to Ekaterina Alexandrova in three sets.

At the WTA 1000 2023 Guadalajara Open, Kalieva entered the main draw as a lucky loser directly into the second round replacing fifth seed Belinda Bencic, but lost to Taylor Townsend.

=== 2024–2026: Miami Open debut & first WTA Tour match win ===
Wins over Varvara Lepchenko and Mona Barthel saw Kalieva in June 2024 reach the quarterfinals at the WTA 125 Open Internacional de Valencia, where she was defeated by eventual champion Ann Li. She gained entry to the main draw of the 2024 Tennis in Cleveland as a lucky loser, going out in the first round against Clara Burel.

Kalieva qualified for her third WTA 1000 main draw at the 2026 Miami Open defeating Diane Parry. She recorded her first WTA Tour win defeating alternate Dalma Galfi, before losing to 21st seed Elise Mertens in the second round.

== Grand Slam singles performance timeline ==
Key
W	F	SF	QF	#R	RR	Q#	DNQ	A	NH

(W) winner; (F) finalist; (SF) semifinalist; (QF) quarterfinalist; (#R) rounds 4, 3, 2, 1; (RR) round-robin stage; (Q#) qualification round; (DNQ) did not qualify; (A) absent; (NH) not held; (SR) strike rate (events won / competed); (W–L) win–loss record.
To avoid confusion and double counting, these charts are updated at the conclusion of a tournament or when the player's participation has ended.

Tournament	2021	2022	2023	2024	2025	2026	W–L
Australian Open	A	A	A	Q1	A	Q3	0–0
French Open	A	A	A	Q1	A	Q1	0–0
Wimbledon	A	Q1	A	Q1	A	Q2	0–0
US Open	Q2	Q1	Q2	A	A	1R	0–1
Win–Loss	0–0	0–0	0–0	0–0	0–0	0–1	0–1

== WTA 125 finals ==
=== Doubles: 1 (runner-up) ===
Result	W–L	Date	Tournament	Surface	Partner	Opponents	Score
Loss	0–1	Sep 2025	Open de San Sebastián, Spain	Clay	(Romania) Gabriela Lee	Anastasia Tikhonova (Croatia) Tara Würth	3–6, 0–6

== ITF Circuit finals ==
=== Singles: 9 (3 titles, 6 runner-ups) ===
Legend W100 tournaments (1–1) W60 tournaments (1–2) W50 tournaments (0–1) W25/35 tournaments (1–2)	Finals by surface Hard (1–4) Clay (2–2)

Result	W–L	Date	Tournament	Tier	Surface	Opponent	Score
Loss	0–1	Oct 2021	Rancho Santa Fe Open, United States	W60	Hard	(Sweden) Rebecca Peterson	4–6, 0–6
Loss	0–2	May 2022	Pelham Pro Classic, United States	W60	Clay	(Argentina) María Lourdes Carlé	1–6, 1–6
Loss	0–3	Jul 2022	Dallas Summer Series, United States	W25	Hard	(United States) Katrina Scott	1–6, 0–6
Win	1–3	May 2023	ITF Warmbad Villach, Austria	W25	Clay	(Czech Republic) Julie Štruplová	4–6, 6–2, 6–1
Win	2–3	Jun 2023	ITF Říčany, Czech Republic	W60	Clay	(Japan) Misaki Doi	7–6^{(2)}, 6–0
Loss	2–4	Oct 2024	ITF Hilton Head Island, United States	W35	Hard	(Ukraine) Anastasiya Lopata	3–6, 2–6
Loss	2–5	Dec 2024	ITF Tampa, United States	W50	Clay	(United States) Caty McNally	4–6, 5–7
Loss	2–6	Oct 2025	Guanajuato Open, Mexico	W100	Hard	(Canada) Marina Stakusic	2–6, 2–6
Win	3–6	Jan 2026	San Diego Open, United States	W100	Hard	(United States) Elizabeth Mandlik	3–6, 6–3, 6–1

=== Doubles: 6 (4 titles, 2 runner-ups) ===
Legend W80 tournaments (1–0) W60/75 tournaments (1–2) W40 tournaments (1–0) W35 tournaments (1–0)	Finals by surface Hard (2–1) Clay (2–1)

Result	W–L	Date	Tournament	Tier	Surface	Partner	Opponents	Score
Loss	0–1	May 2022	Pelham Pro Classic, United States	W60	Clay	(United States) Reese Brantmeier	(United States) Carolyn Ansari (Canada) Ariana Arseneault	5–7, 1–6
Win	1–1	Sep 2022	Berkeley Club Challenge, United States	W60	Hard	(United States) Peyton Stearns	(United States) Allura Zamarripa (United States) Maribella Zamarripa	7–6^{(5)}, 7–6^{(5)}
Win	2–1	Oct 2022	Rancho Santa Fe Open, United States	W80	Hard	(Poland) Katarzyna Kawa	(Mexico) Marcela Zacarías (Mexico) Giuliana Olmos	6–1, 3–6, [10–2]
Win	3–1	Jun 2023	ITF Otočec, Slovenia	W40	Clay	(Georgia (country)) Ekaterine Gorgodze	(Canada) Kayla Cross (United States) Sofia Sewing	6–2, 6–3
Win	4–1	Jan 2024	ITF Naples, United States	W35	Clay	Maria Kozyreva	(Netherlands) Isabelle Haverlag (Bulgaria) Lia Karatancheva	6–0, 6–0
Loss	4–2	Jul 2025	Lexington Open, United States	W75	Hard	(United States) Alana Smith	(United States) Ayana Akli (United States) Eryn Cayetano	6–4, 2–6, [4–10]

== Junior Grand Slam tournament finals ==
=== Doubles: 1 (runner-up) ===
Result	Year	Tournament	Surface	Partner	Opponents	Score
Loss	2021	US Open	Hard	(United States) Reese Brantmeier	(United States) Ashlyn Krueger (United States) Robin Montgomery	7–5, 3–6, [4–10]
