= Ariana Arseneault =

Canadian tennis player (born 2002)

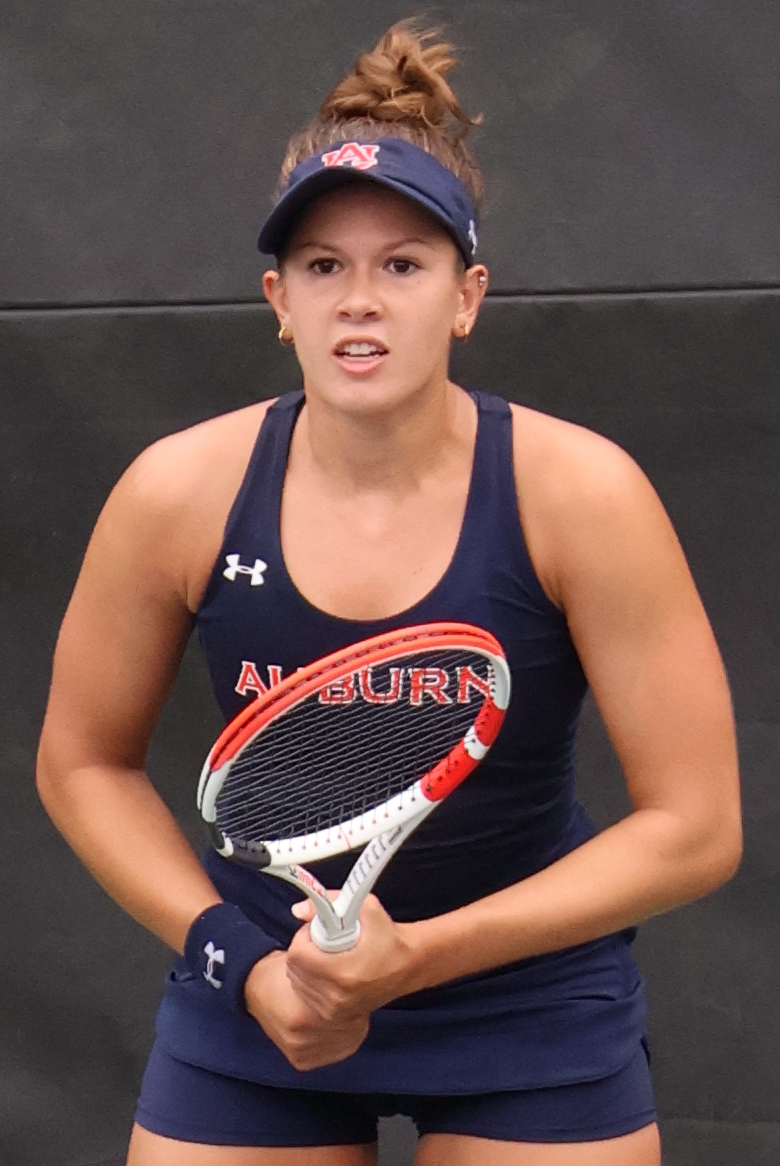
- Arseneault in 2023
- Country (sports): Canada
- Born: 15 June 2002 (age 24) Richmond Hill, Ontario, Canada
- Height: 1.77 m (5 ft 10 in)
- Plays: Right-handed
- College: Georgia, Auburn
- Prize money: $123,571

Singles
- Career record: 98–84
- Career titles: 1 ITF
- Highest ranking: No. 352 (3 August 2026)
- Current ranking: No. 385 (10 August 2026)

Doubles
- Career record: 101–61
- Career titles: 12 ITF
- Highest ranking: No. 111 (14 July 2025)
- Current ranking: No. 199 (10 August 2026)
- Last updated on: 19 August 2026.

Ariana Arseneault (born 15 June 2002) is a Canadian tennis player. She has a career-high singles ranking by the WTA of 352, achieved on 3 August 2026, and a best doubles ranking of world No. 111, achieved on 14 July 2025.

Arseneault played college tennis at the University of Georgia, before transferring to Auburn University.

== Career ==
Partnering Mia Kupres, Arseneault won the 2024 Championnats de Granby, defeating Liang En-shuo and Park So-hyun in the final. The pair were also runners-up at the 2024 Midland Tennis Classic, losing in the final to second seeds Emily Appleton and Maia Lumsden.

== WTA 125 finals ==
=== Doubles: 2 (runner-ups) ===
Result	W–L	Date	Tournament	Surface	Partner	Opponents	Score
Loss	0–1	Nov 2024	Midland Tennis Classic, United States	Hard (i)	(Canada) Mia Kupres	(United Kingdom) Emily Appleton (United Kingdom) Maia Lumsden	2–6, 6–4, [5–10]
Loss	0–2	Sep 2026	Porto Open, Portugal	Hard	(Canada) Raphaëlle Lacasse	(Portugal) Francisca Jorge (Portugal) Matilde Jorge	3–6, 6–3, [3–10]

== ITF Circuit finals ==
=== Singles: 3 (1 title, 2 runner-ups) ===
Legend W35 tournaments W15 tournaments	Finals by surface Hard (1–2)

Result	W–L	Date	Tournament	Tier	Surface	Opponent	Score
Loss	0–1	Oct 2024	ITF Edmonton, Canada	W35	Hard (i)	(France) Julie Belgraver	1–6, 6–3, 2–6
Win	1–1	Mar 2026	ITF Trois-Rivières, Canada	W15	Hard (i)	(United States) Dasha Ivanova	6–0, 5–7, 7–6^{(3)}
Loss	1–2	Jul 2026	Saskatoon Challenger, Canada	W35	Hard	(Canada) Teah Chavez	6–2, 4–6, 4–6

=== Doubles: 19 (14 titles, 5 runner-ups) ===
Legend W60/75 tournaments W50 tournaments W25/35 tournaments W15 tournaments	Finals by surface Hard (11–5) Clay (3–0)

Result	W–L	Date	Tournament	Tier	Surface	Partner	Opponents	Score
Win	1–0	Dec 2021	ITF Cancún, Mexico	W15	Hard	(Canada) Stacey Fung	(Bulgaria) Eleonore Tchakarova (Bulgaria) Verginie Tchakarova	1–6, 7–6^{(2)}, [10–7]
Win	2–0	May 2022	Pelham Pro Classic, United States	W60	Clay	(United States) Carolyn Ansari	(United States) Reese Brantmeier (United States) Elvina Kalieva	7–5, 6–1
Loss	2–1	Jun 2022	ITF Wichita, US	W25	Hard	(United States) Carolyn Ansari	(United States) Allura Zamarripa (United States) Maribella Zamarripa	4–6, 2–6
Win	3–1	July 2024	Championnats de Granby, Canada	W75	Hard	(Canada) Mia Kupres	(Chinese Taipei) Liang En-shuo (South Korea) Park So-hyun	6–4, 2–6, [10–6]
Win	4–1	Aug 2024	Saskatoon Challenger, Canada	W35	Hard	(Canada) Mia Kupres	(Japan) Hiroko Kuwata (United States) Maribella Zamarripa	6–4, 6–3
Win	5–1	Sep 2024	ITF Punta Cana, Dominican Republic	W35	Clay	(Canada) Kayla Cross	(Belgium) Margaux Maquet (Spain) María Martínez Vaquero	6–4, 7–6^{(5)}
Win	6–1	Sep 2024	ITF Punta Cana, Dominican Republic	W35	Clay	(Canada) Kayla Cross	(Kazakhstan) Zhibek Kulambayeva (India) Sahaja Yamalapalli	6–1, 5–7, [10–8]
Win	7–1	Feb 2025	ITF Manchester, United Kingdom	W35	Hard (i)	(United States) Anna Rogers	(Poland) Weronika Falkowska (Poland) Martyna Kubka	6–7^{(5)}, 6–1, [10–8]
Loss	7–2	Sep 2025	ITF Monastir, Tunisia	W35	Hard	(United States) Carolyn Ansari	(Poland) Martyna Kubka (Slovakia) Katarína Kužmová	5–7, 4–6
Win	8–2	Oct 2025	Challenger de Saguenay, Canada	W75	Hard (i)	(Canada) Raphaëlle Lacasse	(Netherlands) Jasmijn Gimbrère (United States) Anna Rogers	5–7, 6–3, [10–5]
Win	9–2	Nov 2025	ITF Chihuahua, Mexico	W50	Hard	(Canada) Raphaëlle Lacasse	(Mexico) Fernanda Navarro (Canada) Alexandra Vagramov	2–6, 7–6^{(4)}, [10–6]
Loss	9–3	Nov 2025	ITF Chihuahua, Mexico	W50	Hard	(Canada) Raphaëlle Lacasse	(United States) Dalayna Hewitt (United States) Anna Rogers	3–6, 0–6
Win	10–3	Dec 2025	ITF Monastir, Tunisia	W35	Hard	(United Kingdom) Alicia Dudeney	(United States) Kailey Evans (United States) Jordyn McBride	6–4, 6–2
Win	11–3	Feb 2026	ITF The Hague, Netherlands	W35	Hard (i)	(Canada) Raphaëlle Lacasse	(New Zealand) Valentina Ivanov (Denmark) Rebecca Munk Mortensen	6–4, 3–6, [10–5]
Loss	11–4	Mar 2026	ITF Trois-Rivières, Canada	W15	Hard (i)	(United Kingdom) Esther Adeshina	(United States) Dasha Ivanova (Canada) Alexandra Vagramov	3–6, 6–3, [2–10]
Win	12–4	May 2026	ITF Estepona, Spain	W35	Hard	(United Kingdom) Alicia Dudeney	(France) Nahia Berecoechea (Poland) Zuzanna Pawlikowska	6–4, 7–5
Win	13–4	Sep 2026	ITF Évora, Portugal	W50	Hard	(Canada) Raphaëlle Lacasse	(Slovakia) Katarína Kužmová (Australia) Elena Micic	6–3, 6–4
Loss	13–5	Oct 2026	ITF Quebec City, Canada	W50	Hard (i)	(Canada) Raphaëlle Lacasse	(United States) Reese Brantmeier (United Kingdom) Mimi Xu	2–6, 7–6^{(5)}, [7–10]
Win	14–5	Oct 2026	Tevlin Women's Challenger, Canada	W75	Hard (i)	(Canada) Raphaëlle Lacasse	(United States) Ayana Akli (United States) Madison Sieg	6–1, 7–6^{(3)}
