= Carolyn Ansari =

American tennis player (born 2000)

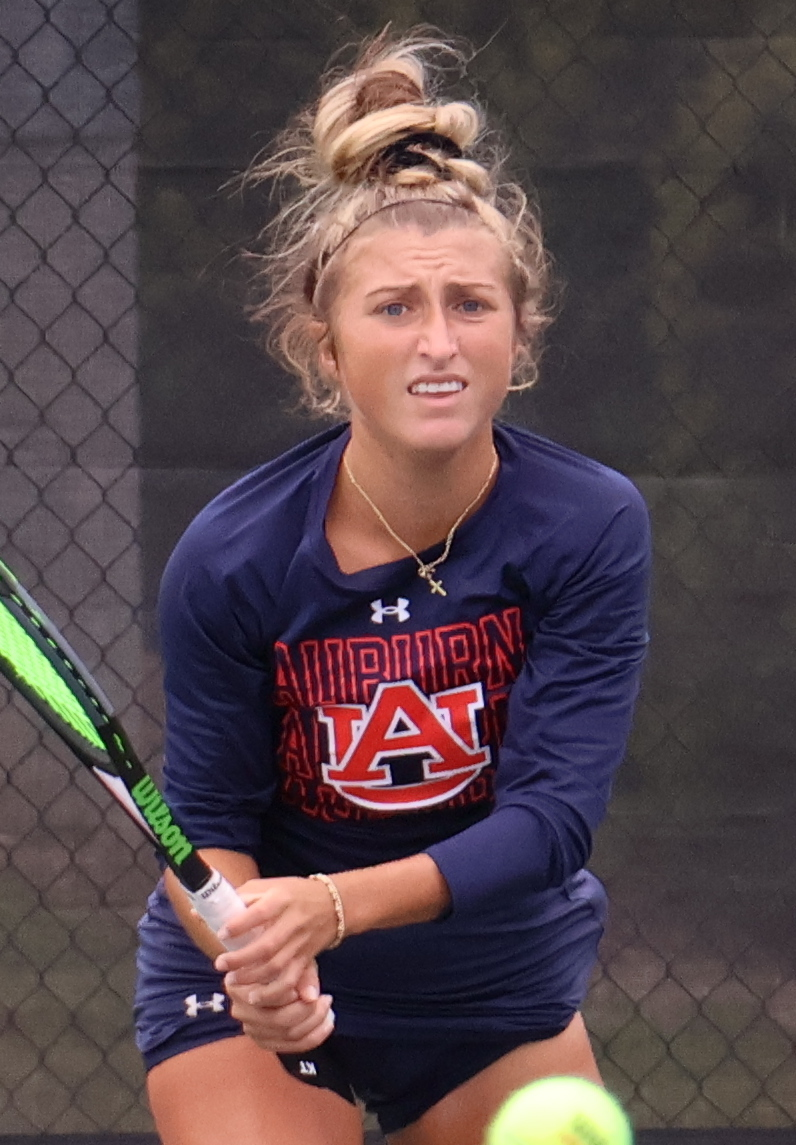
- Ansari in 2023
- Country (sports): United States
- Residence: Greensboro, North Carolina
- Born: 29 December 2000 (age 25)
- Plays: Right (two-handed backhand)
- College: Auburn University
- Prize money: $102,869

Singles
- Career record: 146–88
- Career titles: 4 ITF
- Highest ranking: No. 249 (10 August 2026)
- Current ranking: No. 249 (10 August 2026)

Doubles
- Career record: 70–52
- Career titles: 5 ITF
- Highest ranking: No. 426 (27 February 2023)
- Current ranking: No. 550 (10 August 2026)
- Last updated on: 19 August 2026.

Carolyn Ansari (born 29 December 2000) is an American tennis player.

Ansari has a career-high singles ranking by the Women's Tennis Association (WTA) of 249, achieved on 10 August 2026. She also has a career-high doubles ranking by the WTA of 426, achieved on 27 February 2023. Ansari has won four singles titles and five doubles titles on the ITF Women's World Tennis Tour.

Ansari won the biggest title of her career-to-date at the 2022 Pelham Racquet Club Pro Classic, where she won the doubles title, partnering with Ariana Arseneault.

Ansari attends college at Auburn University.

== ITF Circuit finals ==
=== Singles: 13 (5 titles, 8 runner-ups) ===
Legend W50 tournaments W35 tournaments W15 tournaments	Finals by surface Hard (5–8)

Result	W–L	Date	Tournament	Tier	Surface	Opponent	Score
Loss	0–1	Dec 2022	ITF Santo Domingo, Dominican Republic	W15	Hard	(United States) Jenna De Falco	2–6, 0–6
Loss	0–2	Feb 2025	ITF Sharm El Sheikh, Egypt	W15	Hard	(Slovakia) Katarína Kužmová	7–6^{(3)}, 3–6, 4–6
Loss	0–3	Feb 2025	ITF Sharm El Sheikh, Egypt	W15	Hard	(Czech Republic) Anna Sisková	1–6, 3–6
Win	1–3	Mar 2025	ITF Sharm El Sheikh, Egypt	W15	Hard	(Lithuania) Patricija Paukštytė	6–2, 3–6, 6–4
Win	2–3	Mar 2025	ITF Sharm El Sheikh, Egypt	W15	Hard	(United States) Dasha Ivanova	6–4, 2–6, 6–3
Loss	2–4	Aug 2025	ITF Monastir, Tunisia	W15	Hard	(Czech Republic) Jana Kovačková	6–7^{(5)}, 3–6
Loss	2–5	Sep 2025	ITF Monastir, Tunisia	W35	Hard	(France) Yasmine Mansouri	2–6, 5–7
Loss	2–6	Oct 2025	ITF Lagos, Portugal	W35	Hard	(South Korea) Ku Yeon-woo	2–6, 6–4, 6–7^{(5)}
Win	3–6	Nov 2025	ITF Monastir, Tunisia	W35	Hard	(United States) Kailey Evans	7–6^{(5)}, 6–2
Win	4–6	Jan 2026	ITF Monastir, Tunisia	W15	Hard	Milana Zhabrailova	5–7, 6–3, 6–1
Loss	4–7	May 2026	ITF Lopota, Georgia	W50	Hard	(Czech Republic) Vendula Valdmannová	6–4, 4–6, 0–6
Loss	4–8	May 2026	ITF Monastir, Tunisia	W35	Hard	(Serbia) Elena Milovanović	1–6, 5–7
Win	5–8	Aug 2026	ITF Monastir, Tunisia	W15	Hard	(New Zealand) Elyse Tse	6–4, 7–5

=== Doubles: 11 (5 titles, 6 runner-ups) ===
Legend W60 tournaments W50 tournaments W25 tournaments W15 tournaments	Finals by surface Hard (4–4) Clay (1–2)

Result	W–L	Date	Tournament	Tier	Surface	Partner	Opponents	Score
Win	1–0	May 2022	Pelham Pro Classic, United States	W60	Clay	(Canada) Ariana Arseneault	(United States) Reese Brantmeier (United States) Elvina Kalieva	7–5, 6–1
Loss	1–1	Jun 2022	ITF Wichita, United States	W25	Hard	(Canada) Ariana Arseneault	(United States) Allura Zamarripa (United States) Maribella Zamarripa	4–6, 2–6
Loss	1–2	Jul 2023	ITF Punta Cana, Dominican Republic	W25	Clay	(United States) Adeline Flach	(France) Emma Léné (Germany) Emily Seibold	1–6, 2–6
Loss	1–3	Jul 2024	ITF Lakewood, United States	W15	Hard	(South Africa) Gabriella Broadfoot	(United States) Malaika Rapolu (Ukraine) Anita Sahdiieva	4–6, 6–2, [8–10]
Win	2–3	Jul 2024	ITF Lakewood, United States	W15	Hard	(South Africa) Gabriella Broadfoot	(United States) Amelia Honer (India) Teja Tirunelveli	6–7^{(3)}, 6–3, [10–3]
Win	3–3	Feb 2025	ITF Sharm El Sheikh	W15	Hard	(Japan) Ayumi Miyamoto	(Egypt) Yasmine Ezzat (Italy) Gaia Squarcialupi	5–7, 6–4, [10–6]
Win	4–3	Mar 2025	ITF Sharm El Sheikh	W15	Hard	(Poland) Zuzanna Pawlikowska	(Romania) Elena-Teodora Cadar (Bulgaria) Isabella Shinikova	6–4, 6–0
Win	5–3	Mar 2025	ITF Sharm El Sheikh	W15	Hard	(United Kingdom) Victoria Allen	(United Kingdom) Danielle Daley (Romania) Arina Vasilescu	6–2, 6–2
Loss	5–4	May 2025	ITF Otočec, Slovenia	W50	Clay	(Japan) Mana Kawamura	(Czech Republic) Denisa Hindová (Slovenia) Kristina Novak	3–6, 6–3, [8–10]
Loss	5–5	Sep 2025	ITF Monastir, Tunisia	W35	Hard	(Canada) Ariana Arseneault	(Poland) Martyna Kubka (Slovakia) Katarína Kužmová	5–7, 4–6
Loss	5–6	Aug 2026	ITF Monastir, Tunisia	W15	Hard	(United Kingdom) Savannah Dada-Mascoll	(Finland) Clarissa Blomqvist (Canada) Alexandra Vagramov	6–7^{(5)}, 2–6
