= Veronika Miroshnichenko =

Russian tennis player (born 1997)

- Country (sports): Russia
- Born: 19 November 1997 (age 28) Moscow, Russia
- Plays: Left-handed
- College: Loyola Marymount
- Prize money: $71,072

Singles
- Career record: 142–79
- Career titles: 4 ITF
- Highest ranking: No. 289 (6 May 2024)
- Current ranking: No. 961 (29 June 2026)

Doubles
- Career record: 93–45
- Career titles: 7 ITF
- Highest ranking: No. 202 (18 March 2024)
- Last updated on: 7 July 2026.

Veronika Miroshnichenko (born 19 November 1997) is a Ukrainian tennis player who represents Russia.

Miroshnichenko was born in Moscow to Ukrainian parents but grew up in Zaporizhzhia, Ukraine before emigrating to the United States. Due to her birth, she has a Russian passport and was forced to represent the country, however she identifies as Ukrainian and as of 2023, is in the process of changing her passport officially.

She has a career-high singles ranking by the WTA of 289, reached on 6 May 2024, and a highest doubles ranking of 202, achieved on 18 March 2024. Miroshnichenko plays college tennis at Loyola Marymount University.

== Career ==
In May 2023, Miroshnichenko won her first 60k title at Pelham, Alabama in the singles draw.

== ITF Circuit finals ==
=== Singles: 7 (5 titles, 2 runner-ups) ===
Legend W60 tournaments (1–0) W10/15 tournaments (4–2)	Finals by surface Hard (2–2) Clay (3–0)

Result	W–L	Date	Tournament	Tier	Surface	Opponent	Score
Loss	0–1	Oct 2015	ITF Sharm El Sheikh, Egypt	W10	Hard	(Philippines) Katharina Lehnert	4–6, 3–6
Win	1–1	Dec 2016	ITF Cairo, Egypt	W10	Clay	(Portugal) Inês Murta	6–2, 6–2
Win	2–1	Dec 2016	ITF Cairo, Egypt	W10	Clay	(France) Victoria Muntean	1–6, 6–4, 7–6^{(5)}
Loss	2–2	Jun 2022	ITF Colorado Springs, United States	W15	Hard	(Serbia) Katarina Kozarov	3–6, 4–6
Win	3–2	May 2023	Pelham Pro Classic, United States	W60	Clay	(Mexico) Renata Zarazúa	7–6^{(5)}, 6–2
Win	4–2	Jul 2025	ITF Los Angeles, United States	W15	Hard	(United States) Kylie Collins	6–2, 6–3
Win	5–2	Jul 2026	ITF Rancho Santa Fe, United States	W15	Hard	Alina Shcherbinina	6–3, 6–4

=== Doubles: 15 (8 titles, 7 runner-ups) ===
Legend W60 tournaments (1–1) W40 tournaments (1–1) W25/35 tournaments (1–1) W10/15 tournaments (5–4)	Finals by surface Hard (7–4) Clay (1–2) Carpet (0–1)

Result	W–L	Date	Tournament	Tier	Surface	Partner	Opponents	Score
Win	1–0	Oct 2015	ITF Sharm El Sheikh, Egypt	W10	Hard	(Russia) Varvara Flink	(Sweden) Jacqueline Cabaj Awad (Czech Republic) Martina Přádová	6–3, 6–4
Loss	1–1	June 2016	ITF Bethany Beach, United States	W10	Clay	(United States) Sofia Sewing	(United States) Sophie Chang (United States) Alexandra Mueller	1–6, 4–6
Win	2–1	Jul 2016	ITF Prokuplje, Serbia	W10	Clay	(Russia) Valeriya Zeleva	(Turkey) Hülya Esen (Turkey) Lütfiye Esen	7–5, 6–1
Loss	2–2	Dec 2016	ITF Cairo, Egypt	W10	Clay	(United Kingdom) Suzy Larkin	(Serbia) Barbara Bonić (Australia) Jelena Stojanovic	1–6, 4–6
Win	3–2	May 2022	ITF Rancho Santa Fe, United States	W15	Hard	(Russia) Maria Kozyreva	(United States) Solymar Colling (Spain) Claudia Armenteras	6–1, 6–3
Loss	3–3	Jun 2022	ITF San Diego, United States	W15	Hard	(Russia) Maria Kozyreva	(United States) Kimmi Hance (United States) Makenna Jones	3–6, 3–6
Loss	3–4	Jun 2022	ITF Colorado Springs, United States	W15	Hard	(Poland) Daria Kuczer	(United States) Carmen Corley (United States) Ivana Corley	6–7^{(4)}, 2–6
Win	4–4	Jul 2022	Dallas Summer Series, United States	W25	Hard	(Russia) Maria Kozyreva	(United States) Jessie Aney (United States) Jessica Failla	6–4, 6–7^{(9)}, [10–5]
Win	5–4	Sep 2022	ITF Lubbock, United States	W15	Hard	(Serbia) Katarina Kozarov	(Chinese Taipei) Hsu Chieh-yu; Maria Kononova	6–1, 4–6, [11–9]
Loss	5–5	Oct 2022	Las Vegas Open, United States	W60	Hard	(Serbia) Katarina Kozarov	(United States) Carmen Corley (United States) Ivana Corley	2–6, 0–6
Win	6–5	Jul 2023	Evansville Classic, United States	W60	Hard	(Russia) Maria Kononova	(United States) McCartney Kessler (Ukraine) Yuliia Starodubtseva	6–3, 2–6, [10–8]
Loss	6–6	Nov 2023	ITF Guadalajara, Mexico	W40	Hard	(Sweden) Fanny Östlund	(United States) Haley Giavara (Canada) Layne Sleeth	4–6, 3–6
Win	7–6	Dec 2023	ITF Veracruz, Mexico	W40	Hard	(United States) Dalayna Hewitt	(Australia) Victoria Hu (Argentina) Melany Krywoj	2–6, 6–3, [10–8]
Loss	7–7	Mar 2024	ITF Solarino, Italy	W35	Carpet	(Serbia) Katarina Kozarov	(Poland) Martyna Kubka (Chinese Taipei) Tsao Chia-yi	4–6, 2–6
Win	8–7	Jul 2026	ITF Rancho Santa Fe, United States	W15	Hard	(Ukraine) Anita Sahdiieva	(United States) Jessica Bernales (United States) Sophia Webster	6–4, 6–3
