= 2018 Central Coast Pro Tennis Open – Singles =

Singles
- 2018 Central Coast Pro Tennis Open

Final
- Champion: (United States) Asia Muhammad
- Runner-up: (Bulgaria) Sesil Karatantcheva
- Score: 2–6, 6–4, 6–3

Events
Singles	Doubles
← 2017 ·	Central Coast Pro Tennis Open	· 2019 →

Sachia Vickery was the defending champion, but chose not to participate.

Asia Muhammad won the title, defeating Sesil Karatantcheva in the final, 2–6, 6–4, 6–3.

== Seeds ==
1. (United States) Taylor Townsend (second round, retired)
2. (United States) Madison Brengle (semifinals)
3. (Brazil) Beatriz Haddad Maia (first round)
4. (United States) Jessica Pegula (second round)
5. (United States) Kristie Ahn (first round)
6. (Russia) Sofya Zhuk (quarterfinals)
7. (Czech Republic) Marie Bouzková (second round)
8. (United States) Jamie Loeb (first round)

== Draw ==
=== Key ===
- Q = Qualifier
- WC = Wild card
- LL = Lucky loser
- Alt = Alternate
- SE = Special exempt
- PR = Protected ranking
- ITF = ITF entry
- JE = Junior exempt
- w/o = Walkover
- r = Retired
- d = Defaulted
- SR = Special ranking

=== Finals ===
Semifinals
(Bulgaria) Sesil Karatantcheva	6	7^{7}
(United States) Grace Min	1	6^{5}
(United States) Asia Muhammad	6	6
2	(United States) Madison Brengle	4	4

Final
(Bulgaria) Sesil Karatantcheva	6	4	3
(United States) Asia Muhammad	2	6	6

=== Top half ===
First round
1/WC	(United States) T Townsend	6	6
(United States) K Day	1	4
(Bulgaria) S Karatantcheva	6	6
Q	(United States) R Anderson	2	3
WC	(United States) A Li	6	6
WC	(United States) S Whittle	4	2
PR	(Argentina) N Podoroska	6	5	4
6	(Russia) S Zhuk	4	7	6
4	(United States) J Pegula	7	6
(United States) L Chirico	5	3
Q	(United States) M Manasse	3	2
(United States) G Min	6	6
(Serbia) J Jakšić	6	6
(Canada) R Marino	3	1
WC	(United States) D Lao	2	3
7	(Czech Republic) M Bouzková	6	6

Second round
1/WC	(United States) T Townsend	0	0^{r}
(Bulgaria) S Karatantcheva	6	3
WC	(United States) A Li	4	4
6	(Russia) S Zhuk	6	6
4	(United States) J Pegula	3	6	1
(United States) G Min	6	3	6
(Serbia) J Jakšić	3	6	6
7	(Czech Republic) M Bouzková	6	1	3

Quarterfinals
(Bulgaria) S Karatantcheva	6	6
6	(Russia) S Zhuk	2	0
(United States) G Min	3	7^{7}	7
(Serbia) J Jakšić	6	6^{3}	5

Semifinals
(Bulgaria) S Karatantcheva	6	7^{7}
(United States) G Min	1	6^{5}

=== Bottom half ===
First round
8	(United States) J Loeb	7	3	6^{5}
(United States) E Bektas	5	6	7^{7}
(United Kingdom) N Broady	4	4
Q	(Switzerland) A Sadiković	6	6
(United States) A Muhammad	6	3	6
Q	(Mexico) G Olmos	3	6	0
(Canada) K Sebov	6	6
3	(Brazil) B Haddad Maia	2	2
5	(United States) K Ahn	0	2
(United States) M Sanchez	6	6
(Norway) U Eikeri	4	6	7^{7}
(United States) M Mateas	6	4	6^{5}
(United States) L Davis	6	5	6
(United States) V Duval	4	7	4
(United States) A Kratzer	4	1
2	(United States) M Brengle	6	6

Second round
(United States) E Bektas	2	5
Q	(Switzerland) A Sadiković	6	7
(United States) A Muhammad	6	5	6
(Canada) K Sebov	1	7	1
(United States) M Sanchez	6	6
(Norway) U Eikeri	3	4
(United States) L Davis	3	2
2	(United States) M Brengle	6	6

Quarterfinals
Q	(Switzerland) A Sadiković	1	3
(United States) A Muhammad	6	6
(United States) M Sanchez	3	1
2	(United States) M Brengle	6	6

Semifinals
(United States) A Muhammad	6	6
2	(United States) M Brengle	4	4
