= 2025 Central Coast Pro Tennis Open – Doubles =

Doubles
- 2025 Central Coast Pro Tennis Open

Final
- Champions: Maria Kozyreva (Slovakia) Martina Okáľová
- Runners-up: (United States) Usue Maitane Arconada (Slovakia) Viktória Hrunčáková
- Score: 6–2, 7–5

Events
Singles	Doubles
← 2024 ·	Central Coast Pro Tennis Open	· 2026 →

Sophie Chang and Rasheeda McAdoo were the defending champions but chose not to participate.

Maria Kozyreva and Martina Okáľová won the title, defeating Usue Maitane Arconada and Viktória Hrunčáková 6–2, 7–5 in the final.

== Seeds ==
1. (Australia) Alexandra Osborne / (Ukraine) Valeriya Strakhova (first round)
2. Maria Kozyreva / (Slovakia) Martina Okáľová (champions)
3. (India) Shrivalli Bhamidipaty / (United States) Abigail Rencheli (first round)
4. (United States) Eryn Cayetano / (United States) Haley Giavara (semifinals)

== Draw ==
=== Key ===
- Q = Qualifier
- WC = Wild card
- LL = Lucky loser
- Alt = Alternate
- ITF = ITF entry
- PR = Protected ranking
- SR = Special ranking
- SE = Special exempt
- JE = Junior exempt
- JR = Junior Accelerator Programme entrant
- CO = College Accelerator Programme entrant
- NG = Next Gen Accelerator Program entrant
- w/o = Walkover
- r = Retired
- d = Defaulted

First round
1	(Australia) A Osborne (Ukraine) V Strakhova	1	2
(United States) F Crawley (Japan) H Sakatsume	6	6
(United States) UM Arconada (Slovakia) V Hrunčáková	6	5	[10]
(United Kingdom) V Allen (United Kingdom) A Rajecki	3	7	[8]
3	(India) S Bhamidipaty (United States) A Rencheli	2	1
(United States) E Bektas (United States) L Chirico	6	6
(Australia) O Gadecki (Poland) O Lincer	1	7	[10]
(United States) K Day (United States) C Liu	6	5	[3]
(United States) M Lewis (United States) B Walker	6	6
(United States) C Harrison (Spain) A Herrero Liñana	1	3
(United States) S Ewing (United States) E Ionescu
4	(United States) E Cayetano (United States) H Giavara	w/o
(Ukraine) A Sahdiieva (United States) K Scott	6	6
WC	(United States) K Buntrock (United States) D Dunkle	2	4
(Canada) C Brace (Canada) K Cross	5	6	[8]
2	M Kozyreva (Slovakia) M Okáľová	7	4	[10]

Quarterfinals
(United States) F Crawley (Japan) H Sakatsume	4	4
(United States) UM Arconada (Slovakia) V Hrunčáková	6	6
(United States) E Bektas (United States) L Chirico	6^{4}	3
(Australia) O Gadecki (Poland) O Lincer	7^{7}	6
(United States) M Lewis (United States) B Walker	4	3
4	(United States) E Cayetano (United States) H Giavara	6	6
(Ukraine) A Sahdiieva (United States) K Scott	6^{1}	7^{7}	[5]
2	M Kozyreva (Slovakia) M Okáľová	7^{7}	6^{3}	[10]

Semifinals
(United States) UM Arconada (Slovakia) V Hrunčáková	6	6
(Australia) O Gadecki (Poland) O Lincer	4	3
4	(United States) E Cayetano (United States) H Giavara	2	4
2	M Kozyreva (Slovakia) M Okáľová	6	6

Final
(United States) UM Arconada (Slovakia) V Hrunčáková	2	5
2	M Kozyreva (Slovakia) M Okáľová	6	7
