= 2024 Central Coast Pro Tennis Open – Doubles =

Doubles
- 2024 Central Coast Pro Tennis Open

Final
- Champions: (United States) Sophie Chang (United States) Rasheeda McAdoo
- Runners-up: (United States) Carmen Corley (Canada) Rebecca Marino
- Score: 1–6, 6–2, [10–4]

Events
Singles	Doubles
← 2023 ·	Central Coast Pro Tennis Open	· 2025 →

McCartney Kessler and Alana Smith were the defending champions but chose not to participate.

Sophie Chang and Rasheeda McAdoo won the title, defeating Carmen Corley and Rebecca Marino in the final; 1–6, 6–2, [10–4].

== Seeds ==
1. Iryna Shymanovich / (Mexico) Renata Zarazúa (semifinals, withdrew)
2. (United States) Sophie Chang / (United States) Rasheeda McAdoo (champions)
3. Maria Kononova / Maria Kozyreva (semifinals)
4. (United States) Carmen Corley / (Canada) Rebecca Marino (final)

== Draw ==
=== Key ===
- Q = Qualifier
- WC = Wild card
- LL = Lucky loser
- Alt = Alternate
- SE = Special exempt
- PR = Protected ranking
- ITF = ITF entry
- JE = Junior exempt
- w/o = Walkover
- r = Retired
- d = Defaulted
- SR = Special ranking

First round
WC	(United States) P Dunkle (United Kingdom) A Leather	4	5
(United States) I Houghton (United States) C Kiss	6	7
4	(United States) C Corley (Canada) R Marino	6	6
(United Kingdom) T Moore (United States) K Scott	3	4
(Australia) A Osborne (Japan) H Sakatsume	2	3
(United States) UM Arconada (United States) K Day	6	6
(United States) V Hu; V Miroshnichenko	7	2	[11]
(Canada) C Brace (United States) P Corley	5	6	[13]
(United States) K Minor (United States) M Sohns	1	3
3	M Kononova; M Kozyreva	6	6
(United States) J Failla (Slovakia) M Okáľová	6	4	[10]
(United States) M Lewis (United States) B Walker	1	6	[4]
(United States) S Colling (United States) S Leon	2	4
2	(United States) S Chang (United States) R McAdoo	6	6

Quarterfinals
1	I Shymanovich (Mexico) R Zarazúa	w/o
(United States) I Houghton (United States) C Kiss
4	(United States) C Corley (Canada) R Marino	6^{1}	6	[10]
(United States) UM Arconada (United States) K Day	7^{7}	3	[6]
(Canada) C Brace (United States) P Corley	2	3
3	M Kononova; M Kozyreva	6	6
(United States) J Failla (Slovakia) M Okáľová	3	4
2	(United States) S Chang (United States) R McAdoo	6	6

Semifinals
1	I Shymanovich (Mexico) R Zarazúa
4	(United States) C Corley (Canada) R Marino	w/o
3	M Kononova; M Kozyreva	4	6	[1]
2	(United States) S Chang (United States) R McAdoo	6	4	[10]

Final
4	(United States) C Corley (Canada) R Marino	6	2	[4]
2	(United States) S Chang (United States) R McAdoo	1	6	[10]
