= 2024 Central Coast Pro Tennis Open =

Tennis tournament

- Date: 23–29 September 2024
- Edition: 6th
- Category: ITF Women's World Tennis Tour
- Prize money: $60,000
- Surface: Hard / Outdoor
- Location: Templeton, California, United States

Champions

Singles
- (Mexico) Renata Zarazúa

Doubles
- (United States) Sophie Chang / (United States) Rasheeda McAdoo
← 2023 ·	Central Coast Pro Tennis Open	· 2025 →

The 2024 Central Coast Pro Tennis Open was a professional tennis tournament played on outdoor hard courts. It was the sixth edition of the tournament which was part of the 2024 ITF Women's World Tennis Tour. It took place in Templeton, California, United States between 23 and 29 September 2024.

== Champions ==
=== Singles ===
- (Mexico) Renata Zarazúa def. (United States) Usue Maitane Arconada 6–4, 6–3

=== Doubles ===
- (United States) Sophie Chang / (United States) Rasheeda McAdoo def. (United States) Carmen Corley / (Canada) Rebecca Marino 1–6, 6–2, [10–4]

== Singles main draw entrants ==
=== Seeds ===
Country	Player	Rank^{1}	Seed
MEX	Renata Zarazúa	78	1
CAN	Rebecca Marino	134	2
JPN	Ena Shibahara	146	3
USA	Kayla Day	170	4
USA	Elizabeth Mandlik	181	5
CZE	Gabriela Knutson	192	6
USA	Louisa Chirico	217	7
	Iryna Shymanovich	227	8

- ^{1} Rankings are as of 16 September 2024.

=== Other entrants ===
The following players received wildcards into the singles main draw:

- (United States) Paris Corley
- (United States) Lauren Davis
- (United States) Jessica Failla
- (Ukraine) Anastasiya Lopata

The following players received entry using special rankings:

- (United States) Usue Maitane Arconada
- (United Kingdom) Tara Moore

The following players received entry from the qualifying draw:

- (United States) Alyssa Ahn
- (Canada) Cadence Brace
- (United States) Jenna DeFalco
- (United States) India Houghton
- Maria Kononova
- (United States) Rasheeda McAdoo
- Veronika Miroshnichenko
- (Poland) Stefania Rogozińska Dzik
