= 2024 Central Coast Pro Tennis Open – Singles =

Singles
- 2024 Central Coast Pro Tennis Open

Final
- Champion: (Mexico) Renata Zarazúa
- Runner-up: (United States) Usue Maitane Arconada
- Score: 6–4, 6–3

Events
Singles	Doubles
← 2023 ·	Central Coast Pro Tennis Open	· 2025 →

Taylor Townsend was the defending champion but chose not to participate.

Renata Zarazúa won the title, defeating Usue Maitane Arconada in the final; 6–4, 6–3.

== Seeds ==
1. (Mexico) Renata Zarazúa (champion)
2. (Canada) Rebecca Marino (quarterfinals)
3. (Japan) Ena Shibahara (first round)
4. (United States) Kayla Day (second round)
5. (United States) Elizabeth Mandlik (quarterfinals)
6. (Czech Republic) Gabriela Knutson (second round)
7. (United States) Louisa Chirico (second round)
8. Iryna Shymanovich (quarterfinals)

== Draw ==
=== Key ===
- Q = Qualifier
- WC = Wild card
- LL = Lucky loser
- Alt = Alternate
- SE = Special exempt
- PR = Protected ranking
- ITF = ITF entry
- JE = Junior exempt
- w/o = Walkover
- r = Retired
- d = Defaulted
- SR = Special ranking

=== Finals ===
Semifinals
1	(Mexico) Renata Zarazúa	6	6
Q	(Canada) Cadence Brace	1	0
(United States) Katrina Scott	6	3	2
SR	(United States) Usue Maitane Arconada	3	6	6

Final
1	(Mexico) Renata Zarazúa	6	6
SR	(United States) Usue Maitane Arconada	4	3

=== Top half ===
First round
1	(Mexico) R Zarazúa	6	6
(Serbia) D Radanović	3	2
(United States) R Anderson	6^{2}	6	7
M Kozyreva	7^{7}	4	5
Q	(United States) J DeFalco	4	0
(United States) S Chang	6	6
SR	(United Kingdom) T Moore	0	2
8	I Shymanovich	6	6
4	(United States) K Day	7	6
(United States) A Urhobo	5	3
Q	(Canada) C Brace	6	7^{7}
Q	(United States) I Houghton	4	6^{3}
(Japan) H Sakatsume	6	6
WC	(United States) P Corley	3	4
WC	(United States) L Davis	6	5	1
6	(Czech Republic) G Knutson	1	7	6

Second round
1	(Mexico) R Zarazúa	6	6
(United States) R Anderson	1	0
(United States) S Chang	7^{9}	1	4
8	I Shymanovich	6^{7}	6	6
4	(United States) K Day	3	6	4
Q	(Canada) C Brace	6	4	6
(Japan) H Sakatsume	6	6
6	(Czech Republic) G Knutson	3	4

Quarterfinals
1	(Mexico) R Zarazúa	7	4	6
8	I Shymanovich	5	6	3
Q	(Canada) C Brace	5	7^{7}	6
(Japan) H Sakatsume	7	6^{4}	2

Semifinals
1	(Mexico) R Zarazúa	6	6
Q	(Canada) C Brace	1	0

=== Bottom half ===
First round
5	(United States) E Mandlik	6	6
(United States) V Hu	4	2
Q	M Kononova	6^{6}	5
Q	(Poland) S Rogozińska Dzik	7^{8}	7
Q	(United States) A Ahn	3	2
(United States) K Scott	6	6
(Canada) K Sebov	6	7^{7}
3	(Japan) E Shibahara	0	6^{4}
7	(United States) L Chirico	6	6
Q	V Miroshnichenko	1	2
SR	(United States) UM Arconada	6	6
Q	(United States) R McAdoo	3	1
WC	(Ukraine) A Lopata	6	6
(Canada) C Branstine	1	1
WC	(United States) J Failla	5	1
2	(Canada) R Marino	7	6

Second round
5	(United States) E Mandlik	6	6
Q	(Poland) S Rogozińska Dzik	0	0
(United States) K Scott	6	4	6
(Canada) K Sebov	2	6	3
7	(United States) L Chirico	2	4
SR	(United States) UM Arconada	6	6
WC	(Ukraine) A Lopata	7^{10}	4	4
2	(Canada) R Marino	6^{8}	6	6

Quarterfinals
5	(United States) E Mandlik	6	3	5
(United States) K Scott	4	6	7
SR	(United States) UM Arconada	1	7^{7}	6
2	(Canada) R Marino	6	6^{3}	1

Semifinals
(United States) K Scott	6	3	2
SR	(United States) UM Arconada	3	6	6
