= 2022 Central Coast Pro Tennis Open =

Tennis tournament

- Date: 26 September–2 October 2022
- Edition: 4th
- Category: ITF Women's World Tennis Tour
- Prize money: $60,000
- Surface: Hard / Outdoor
- Location: Templeton, California, United States

Champions

Singles
- (United States) Madison Brengle

Doubles
- (Japan) Nao Hibino / (United States) Sabrina Santamaria
← 2019 ·	Central Coast Pro Tennis Open	· 2023 →

The 2022 Central Coast Pro Tennis Open was a professional tennis tournament played on outdoor hard courts. It was the fourth edition of the tournament which was part of the 2022 ITF Women's World Tennis Tour. It took place in Templeton, California, United States between 26 September and 2 October 2022.

== Champions ==
=== Singles ===
- (United States) Madison Brengle def. (United States) Robin Montgomery, 4–6, 6–4, 6–2

=== Doubles ===
- (Japan) Nao Hibino / (United States) Sabrina Santamaria def. (United States) Sophie Chang / (Poland) Katarzyna Kawa, 6–4, 7–6^{(7–4)}

== Singles main draw entrants ==
=== Seeds ===
Country	Player	Rank^{1}	Seed
USA	Madison Brengle	60	1
CHN	Yuan Yue	108	2
USA	Katie Volynets	115	3
USA	Asia Muhammad	142	4
JPN	Nao Hibino	150	5
USA	Robin Anderson	155	6
POL	Katarzyna Kawa	157	7
USA	Caroline Dolehide	161	8

- ^{1} Rankings are as of 19 September 2022.

=== Other entrants ===
The following players received wildcards into the singles main draw:

- (United States) Victoria Duval
- (Philippines) Alex Eala
- (United States) Maria Mateas
- (United States) Whitney Osuigwe

The following players received entry from the qualifying draw:

- (United States) Alexa Glatch
- (Israel) Shavit Kimchi
- (United States) Robin Montgomery
- (Japan) Himeno Sakatsume
- (Canada) Katherine Sebov
- (Indonesia) Janice Tjen
- (Germany) Alexandra Vecic
- (Ukraine) Kateryna Volodko
