= 2023 Central Coast Pro Tennis Open =

Tennis tournament

- Date: 25 September–1 October 2023
- Edition: 5th
- Category: ITF Women's World Tennis Tour
- Prize money: $60,000
- Surface: Hard / Outdoor
- Location: Templeton, California, United States

Champions

Singles
- (United States) Taylor Townsend

Doubles
- (United States) McCartney Kessler / (United States) Alana Smith
← 2022 ·	Central Coast Pro Tennis Open	· 2024 →

The 2023 Central Coast Pro Tennis Open is a professional tennis tournament played on outdoor hard courts. It was the fifth edition of the tournament which was part of the 2023 ITF Women's World Tennis Tour. It took place in Templeton, California, United States between 25 September and 1 October 2023.

== Champions ==
=== Singles ===
- (United States) Taylor Townsend def. (Mexico) Renata Zarazúa, 6–3, 6–1

=== Doubles ===
- (United States) McCartney Kessler / (United States) Alana Smith def. (United States) Jessie Aney / (United States) Jaeda Daniel, 7–5, 6–4

== Singles main draw entrants ==
=== Seeds ===
Country	Player	Rank^{1}	Seed
USA	Taylor Townsend	101	1
USA	Katie Volynets	110	2
CAN	Katherine Sebov	153	3
	Iryna Shymanovich	160	4
USA	Ann Li	164	5
USA	Hailey Baptiste	174	6
FRA	Elsa Jacquemot	178	7
MEX	Renata Zarazúa	181	8

- ^{1} Rankings are as of 18 September 2023.

=== Other entrants ===
The following players received wildcards into the singles main draw:

- (United States) Robin Anderson
- (United States) Sophie Chang
- (United States) McCartney Kessler
- (United States) Whitney Osuigwe

The following players received entry from the qualifying draw:

- (Australia) Alexandra Bozovic
- (United States) Hanna Chang
- (United States) Carmen Corley
- (United States) Catherine Harrison
- (Argentina) Melany Solange Krywoj
- Veronika Miroshnichenko
- (Argentina) Lucía Peyre
- (Ukraine) Hanna Poznikhirenko

The following player received entry as a lucky loser:

- (United States) Jessie Aney
