= 2019 Central Coast Pro Tennis Open – Singles =

Singles
- 2019 Central Coast Pro Tennis Open

Final
- Champion: (United States) Shelby Rogers
- Runner-up: (United States) CoCo Vandeweghe
- Score: 4–6, 6–2, 6–3

Events
Singles	Doubles
← 2018 ·	Central Coast Pro Tennis Open	· 2022 →

Asia Muhammad was the defending champion, but chose to participate at the 2019 Darwin Tennis International instead.

Shelby Rogers won the title, defeating CoCo Vandeweghe in the final, 4–6, 6–2, 6–3.

== Seeds ==
1. (United States) Varvara Lepchenko (second round)
2. (United States) Usue Maitane Arconada (first round)
3. (Canada) Eugenie Bouchard (first round)
4. (United States) Ann Li (first round)
5. (United States) Danielle Lao (first round, retired)
6. (Serbia) Jovana Jakšić (quarterfinals)
7. (Israel) Deniz Khazaniuk (first round)
8. (United States) Hailey Baptiste (second round)

== Draw ==
=== Key ===
- Q = Qualifier
- WC = Wild card
- LL = Lucky loser
- Alt = Alternate
- SE = Special exempt
- PR = Protected ranking
- ITF = ITF entry
- JE = Junior exempt
- w/o = Walkover
- r = Retired
- d = Defaulted
- SR = Special ranking

=== Finals ===
Semifinals
(United States) Shelby Rogers	6	3	6
(United States) Emina Bektas	2	6	2
(United States) Grace Min	3	3
WC	(United States) CoCo Vandeweghe	6	6

Final
(United States) Shelby Rogers	4	6	6
WC	(United States) CoCo Vandeweghe	6	2	3

=== Top half ===
First round
1/WC	(United States) V Lepchenko	6	6
WC	(United States) A Kratzer	0	2
Q	(United States) S Marand	5	1
Q	(United States) M Mateas	7	6
Q	(Russia) A Morgina	2	4
(United States) S Rogers	6	6
(United States) K Volynets	1	6	6
7	(Israel) D Khazaniuk	6	1	0
4	(United States) A Li	7	4	3
(United States) C Harrison	5	6	6
WC	(United States) K Kosan	1	5
Q	(United States) E Bolton	6	7
(United States) E Bektas	6	7
Q	(United States) E Douglas	3	5
(Mexico) M Zacarías	5	7^{7}	2
8	(United States) H Baptiste	7	6^{2}	6

Second round
1/WC	(United States) V Lepchenko	6^{6}	0
Q	(United States) M Mateas	7^{8}	6
(United States) S Rogers	6	6
(United States) K Volynets	1	1
(United States) C Harrison	3	7^{7}	3
Q	(United States) E Bolton	6	6^{0}	6
(United States) E Bektas	7	4	6
8	(United States) H Baptiste	5	6	4

Quarterfinals
Q	(United States) M Mateas	2	2
(United States) S Rogers	6	6
Q	(United States) E Bolton	3	3
(United States) E Bektas	6	6

Semifinals
(United States) S Rogers	6	3	6
(United States) E Bektas	2	6	2

=== Bottom half ===
First round
6	(Serbia) J Jakšić	7	6
(United States) Q Gleason	5	1
Q	(United States) P Montez	7	6
Q	(United Kingdom) T Moore	5	0
(United States) K Day	6	3	1
(United States) G Min	4	6	6
(Romania) G Talabă	6	4	6
3	(Canada) E Bouchard	4	6	4
5	(United States) D Lao	5	0^{r}
(United States) H Chang	7	0
PR	(United States) V Duval	6^{4}	2
PR	(United States) I Falconi	7^{7}	6
(Mexico) G Olmos	3	6	6
Q	(United States) S Whittle	6	3	4
WC	(United States) C Vandeweghe	6	6
2	(United States) UM Arconada	4	4

Second round
6	(Serbia) J Jakšić	6	6
Q	(United States) P Montez	4	1
(United States) G Min	6	6
(Romania) G Talabă	1	0
(United States) H Chang	7	0
PR	(United States) I Falconi	5	0^{r}
(Mexico) G Olmos	6^{3}	6	2
WC	(United States) C Vandeweghe	7^{7}	4	6

Quarterfinals
6	(Serbia) J Jakšić	6^{4}	0
(United States) G Min	7^{7}	6
(United States) H Chang	3	6	3
WC	(United States) C Vandeweghe	6	2	6

Semifinals
(United States) G Min	3	3
WC	(United States) C Vandeweghe	6	6
