= 2025 Central Coast Pro Tennis Open – Singles =

Singles
- 2025 Central Coast Pro Tennis Open

Final
- Champion: (United States) Kayla Day
- Runner-up: (Canada) Kayla Cross
- Score: 6–2, 3–0 ret.

Events
Singles	Doubles
- Central Coast Pro Tennis Open

Renata Zarazúa was the defending champion but chose not to participate.

Kayla Day won the title, after Kayla Cross retired from the final.

== Seeds ==
1. (United States) Louisa Chirico (first round)
2. (Japan) Himeno Sakatsume (second round)
3. (Canada) Cadence Brace (first round)
4. (Slovakia) Viktória Hrunčáková (quarterfinals)
5. (Canada) Kayla Cross (final, retired)
6. (United States) Fiona Crawley (first round)
7. (Australia) Olivia Gadecki (semifinals)
8. (Ukraine) Valeriya Strakhova (first round)

== Draw ==
Key

- Q = Qualifier
- WC = Wild card
- LL = Lucky loser
- Alt = Alternate
- ITF = ITF entry
- PR = Protected ranking
- SR = Special ranking
- SE = Special exempt
- JE = Junior exempt
- JR = Junior Accelerator Programme entrant
- CO = College Accelerator Programme entrant
- NG = Next Gen Accelerator Program entrant
- w/o = Walkover
- r = Retired
- d = Defaulted

=== Finals ===
Semifinals
(United States) Emina Bektas	3	3
5	(Canada) Kayla Cross	6	6
7	(Australia) Olivia Gadecki	4	2
(United States) Kayla Day	6	6

Final
5	(Canada) Kayla Cross	2	0^{r}
(United States) Kayla Day	6	3

=== Top half ===
First round
1	(United States) L Chirico	5	3
(United States) M Stoiana	7	6
(India) S Yamalapalli	6	6
Q	(United States) B Walker	1	1
(United Kingdom) A Rajecki	0	3
(United States) UM Arconada	6	6
(United States) E Bektas	6	6
6	(United States) F Crawley	2	1
3	(Canada) C Brace	6	6^{2}	3
(United States) C Liu	1	7^{7}	6
(United States) V Wolff	6	6
Q	(United Kingdom) V Allen	0	1
(India) S Bhamidipaty	5	6	6^{5}
Q	(Poland) O Lincer	7	0	7^{7}
Q	(Venezuela) S Cabezas Domínguez	1	4
5	(Canada) K Cross	6	6

Second round
(United States) M Stoiana	6	6
(India) S Yamalapalli	0	2
(United States) UM Arconada	4	3
(United States) E Bektas	6	6
(United States) C Liu	6	5	6
(United States) V Wolff	4	7	4
Q	(Poland) O Lincer	6^{8}	1
5	(Canada) K Cross	7^{10}	6

Quarterfinals
(United States) M Stoiana	4	1^{r}
(United States) E Bektas	6	0
(United States) C Liu	3	6	6^{9}
5	(Canada) K Cross	6	4	7^{11}

Semifinals
(United States) E Bektas	3	3
5	(Canada) K Cross	6	6

=== Bottom half ===
First round
7	(Australia) O Gadecki	4	7	6
(United States) J Pareja	6	5	2
(United States) E Cayetano	6	6
WC	(United States) J DeFalco	2	4
Q	(Slovakia) M Okáľová	3	2
(Spain) A Herrero Liñana	6	6
Q	(Mexico) M Portillo Ramírez	2	3
4	(Slovakia) V Hrunčáková	6	6
8	(Ukraine) V Strakhova	2	0
(United States) H Giavara	6	6
WC	(United States) K Scott	6	7^{7}
Q	E Laskevich	4	6^{3}
WC	(United States) S Ewing	4	2
(United States) K Day	6	6
Q	M Kozyreva	6^{10}	2
2	(Japan) H Sakatsume	7^{12}	6

Second round
7	(Australia) O Gadecki	6	4	7
(United States) E Cayetano	3	6	5
(Spain) A Herrero Liñana	3	6^{2}
4	(Slovakia) V Hrunčáková	6	7^{7}
(United States) H Giavara	5	0
WC	(United States) K Scott	7	6
(United States) K Day	6	6
2	(Japan) H Sakatsume	3	3

Quarterfinals
7	(Australia) O Gadecki	5	6	6
4	(Slovakia) V Hrunčáková	7	4	2
WC	(United States) K Scott	5	2
(United States) K Day	7	6

Semifinals
7	(Australia) O Gadecki	4	2
(United States) K Day	6	6
