= 2017 Central Coast Pro Tennis Open =

- Date: 25 September–1 October
- Edition: 1st
- Category: ITF Women's Circuit
- Prize money: $60,000
- Surface: Hard
- Location: Templeton, United States

Champions

Singles
- (United States) Sachia Vickery

Doubles
- (United States) Kaitlyn Christian / (Mexico) Giuliana Olmos
Central Coast Pro Tennis Open	· 2018 →

The 2017 Central Coast Pro Tennis Open was a professional tennis tournament played on outdoor hard courts. It was the first edition of the tournament and was part of the 2017 ITF Women's Circuit. It took place in Templeton, United States, on 25 September–1 October 2017.

== Singles main draw entrants ==
=== Seeds ===
Country	Player	Rank^{1}	Seed
SUI	Viktorija Golubic	110	1
USA	Sofia Kenin	111	2
CAN	Françoise Abanda	115	3
USA	Sachia Vickery	127	4
USA	Taylor Townsend	129	5
GBR	Naomi Broady	130	6
SVK	Anna Karolína Schmiedlová	159	7
USA	Jamie Loeb	160	8

- ^{1} Rankings as of 18 September 2017.

=== Other entrants ===
The following players received a wildcard into the singles main draw:

- (United States) Robin Anderson
- (United States) Quinn Gleason
- (United States) Taylor Townsend
- (United States) Sophia Whittle

The following players received entry by a special exempt:

- (United States) Emina Bektas
- (United States) Maria Sanchez

The following players received entry from the qualifying draw:

- (Russia) Elena Bovina
- (Russia) Alisa Kleybanova
- (United States) Sabrina Santamaria
- (United States) Anna Tatishvili

== Champions ==
=== Singles ===
- (United States) Sachia Vickery def. (United States) Jamie Loeb, 6–1, 6–2

=== Doubles ===
- (United States) Kaitlyn Christian / (Mexico) Giuliana Olmos def. (Switzerland) Viktorija Golubic / (Switzerland) Amra Sadiković, 7–5, 6–3
