= 2019 Central Coast Pro Tennis Open =

- Date: 23–29 September 2019
- Edition: 3rd
- Category: ITF Women's World Tennis Tour
- Prize money: $60,000
- Surface: Hard
- Location: Templeton, California, United States

Champions

Singles
- (United States) Shelby Rogers

Doubles
- (Montenegro) Vladica Babić / (United States) Caitlin Whoriskey
← 2018 ·	Central Coast Pro Tennis Open	· 2022 →

The 2019 Central Coast Pro Tennis Open was a professional tennis tournament played on outdoor hard courts. It was the third edition of the tournament which was part of the 2019 ITF Women's World Tennis Tour. It took place in Templeton, California, United States between 23 and 29 September 2019.

== Singles main-draw entrants ==
=== Seeds ===
Country	Player	Rank^{1}	Seed
USA	Varvara Lepchenko	134	1
USA	Usue Maitane Arconada	145	2
CAN	Eugenie Bouchard	152	3
USA	Ann Li	153	4
USA	Danielle Lao	184	5
SRB	Jovana Jakšić	221	6
ISR	Deniz Khazaniuk	224	7
USA	Hailey Baptiste	260	8

- ^{1} Rankings are as of 16 September 2019.

=== Other entrants ===
The following players received wildcards into the singles main draw:

- (United States) Klara Kosan
- (United States) Ashley Kratzer
- (United States) Varvara Lepchenko
- (United States) CoCo Vandeweghe

The following players received entry into the singles main draw using protected rankings:

- (United States) Victoria Duval
- (United States) Irina Falconi

The following players received entry from the qualifying draw:

- (United States) Elysia Bolton
- (United States) Ellie Douglas
- (United States) Sanaz Marand
- (United States) Maria Mateas
- (United States) Pamela Montez
- (United Kingdom) Tara Moore
- (Russia) Anna Morgina
- (United States) Sophia Whittle

== Champions ==
=== Singles ===
- (United States) Shelby Rogers def. (United States) CoCo Vandeweghe, 4–6, 6–2, 6–3

=== Doubles ===
- (Montenegro) Vladica Babić / (United States) Caitlin Whoriskey def. (Romania) Gabriela Talabă / (Mexico) Marcela Zacarías, 6–4, 6–2
