= 2022 Central Coast Pro Tennis Open – Singles =

Singles
- 2022 Central Coast Pro Tennis Open

Final
- Champion: (United States) Madison Brengle
- Runner-up: (United States) Robin Montgomery
- Score: 4–6, 6–4, 6–2

Events
Singles	Doubles
← 2019 ·	Central Coast Pro Tennis Open	· 2023 →

Shelby Rogers was the defending champion but chose not to participate.

Madison Brengle won the title, defeating Robin Montgomery in the final, 4–6, 6–4, 6–2.

== Seeds ==
1. (United States) Madison Brengle (champion)
2. (China) Yuan Yue (quarterfinals)
3. (United States) Katie Volynets (first round)
4. (United States) Asia Muhammad (first round)
5. (Japan) Nao Hibino (quarterfinals)
6. (United States) Robin Anderson (first round)
7. (Poland) Katarzyna Kawa (quarterfinals)
8. (United States) Caroline Dolehide (first round)

== Draw ==
=== Key ===
- Q = Qualifier
- WC = Wild card
- LL = Lucky loser
- Alt = Alternate
- SE = Special exempt
- PR = Protected ranking
- ITF = ITF entry
- JE = Junior exempt
- w/o = Walkover
- r = Retired
- d = Defaulted
- SR = Special ranking

=== Finals ===
Semifinals
1	(United States) Madison Brengle	6	6
(United States) Sophie Chang	2	3
Q	(United States) Robin Montgomery	6	6
Q	(Ukraine) Kateryna Volodko	3	1

Final
1	(United States) Madison Brengle	4	6	6
Q	(United States) Robin Montgomery	6	4	2

=== Top half ===
First round
1	(United States) M Brengle	7	6
(Netherlands) A Hartono	5	4
WC	(United States) W Osuigwe	5	7	1
Q	(Indonesia) J Tjen	7	5	6
Q	(Germany) A Vecic	4	1
(United States) A Krueger	6	6
(United States) G Min	3	0
5	(Japan) N Hibino	6	6
3	(United States) K Volynets	4	3
(United States) S Chang	6	6
(United States) K Day	7^{7}	2	1
WC	(United States) M Mateas	6^{4}	6	6
Q	(Canada) K Sebov	3^{r}
(Mexico) M Zacarías	3
(United States) K Scott	6^{3}	7^{8}	7
8	(United States) C Dolehide	7^{7}	6^{6}	5

Second round
1	(United States) M Brengle	6	6
Q	(Indonesia) J Tjen	1	4
(United States) A Krueger	0	3
5	(Japan) N Hibino	6	6
(United States) S Chang	6	6
WC	(United States) M Mateas	3	3
(Mexico) M Zacarías	6	6
(United States) K Scott	4	1

Quarterfinals
1	(United States) M Brengle	6	6
5	(Japan) N Hibino	1	2
(United States) S Chang	6	7
(Mexico) M Zacarías	2	5

Semifinals
1	(United States) M Brengle	6	6
(United States) S Chang	2	3

=== Bottom half ===
First round
7	(Poland) K Kawa	6	4	6
(Mexico) R Zarazúa	3	6	2
WC	(Philippines) A Eala	6	6
Q	(Israel) S Kimchi	0	0
Q	(United States) R Montgomery	6	3	6
Q	(Japan) H Sakatsume	2	6	2
WC	(United States) V Duval	6	2	6
4	(United States) A Muhammad	4	6	3
6	(United States) R Anderson	1	6	2
Q	(Ukraine) K Volodko	6	1	6
(United States) E Kalieva	6	6
(United States) L Chirico	4	2
(Australia) A Sharma	6	6
Q	(United States) A Glatch	3	4
(United States) D Lao	1	1
2	(China) Y Yuan	6	6

Second round
7	(Poland) K Kawa	2	6	6
WC	(Philippines) A Eala	6	4	0
Q	(United States) R Montgomery	6	6
WC	(United States) V Duval	1	2
Q	(Ukraine) K Volodko	6	4	6
(United States) E Kalieva	3	6	4
(Australia) A Sharma	3	2
2	(China) Y Yuan	6	6

Quarterfinals
7	(Poland) K Kawa	3	1
Q	(United States) R Montgomery	6	6
Q	(Ukraine) K Volodko	7^{7}	6
2	(China) Y Yuan	6^{5}	4

Semifinals
Q	(United States) R Montgomery	6	6
Q	(Ukraine) K Volodko	3	1
