= 2019 Central Coast Pro Tennis Open – Doubles =

Tennis tournament

Doubles
- 2019 Central Coast Pro Tennis Open

Final
- Champions: (Montenegro) Vladica Babić (United States) Caitlin Whoriskey
- Runners-up: (Romania) Gabriela Talabă (Mexico) Marcela Zacarías
- Score: 6–4, 6–2

Events
Singles	Doubles
← 2018 ·	Central Coast Pro Tennis Open	· 2022 →

Asia Muhammad and Maria Sanchez were the defending champions, but chose not to participate.

Vladica Babić and Caitlin Whoriskey won the title, defeating Gabriela Talabă and Marcela Zacarías in the final, 6–4, 6–2.

== Seeds ==
1. (United States) Quinn Gleason / (United States) Ingrid Neel (first round)
2. (United States) Shelby Rogers / (United States) CoCo Vandeweghe (quarterfinals)
3. (Montenegro) Vladica Babić / (United States) Caitlin Whoriskey (champions)
4. (United States) Emina Bektas / (United Kingdom) Tara Moore (semifinals)

== Draw ==
=== Key ===
- Q = Qualifier
- WC = Wild card
- LL = Lucky loser
- Alt = Alternate
- SE = Special exempt
- PR = Protected ranking
- ITF = ITF entry
- JE = Junior exempt
- w/o = Walkover
- r = Retired
- d = Defaulted
- SR = Special ranking

=== Draw ===
First round
1	(United States) Q Gleason (United States) I Neel	6^{4}	3
(United States) A Kulikov (Mexico) G Olmos	7^{7}	6
(United States) B Boren (United States) A Kratzer	3	2
(United States) K Day (United States) S Whittle	6	6
3	(Montenegro) V Babić (United States) C Whoriskey	4	7^{7}	[10]
(United States) J Cako (Serbia) J Jakšić	6	6^{4}	[6]
(United States) V Lepchenko (United States) M Mateas	6	3	[6]
(Israel) D Khazaniuk (United States) A Parks	3	6	[10]
(Russia) A Gabueva (Russia) A Morgina	0	4
(United States) V Duval (United States) C Harrison	6	6
(China) H Guo (Australia) O Tjandramulia	6^{6}	4
4	(United States) E Bektas (United Kingdom) T Moore	7^{8}	6
(Romania) G Talabă (Mexico) M Zacarías	6^{4}	6	[10]
WC	(United States) D Dunkle (United States) E Monaghan	7^{7}	1	[4]
(United States) H Chang (United States) S Marand	5	7^{7}	[3]
2	(United States) S Rogers (United States) C Vandeweghe	7	6^{4}	[10]

Quarterfinals
(United States) A Kulikov (Mexico) G Olmos	6	6
(United States) K Day (United States) S Whittle	3	2
3	(Montenegro) V Babić (United States) C Whoriskey	6	3	[10]
(Israel) D Khazaniuk (United States) A Parks	1	6	[8]
(United States) V Duval (United States) C Harrison	6	3	[6]
4	(United States) E Bektas (United Kingdom) T Moore	2	6	[10]
(Romania) G Talabă (Mexico) M Zacarías	6	7
2	(United States) S Rogers (United States) C Vandeweghe	4	5

Semifinals
(United States) A Kulikov (Mexico) G Olmos	1	6	[2]
3	(Montenegro) V Babić (United States) C Whoriskey	6	4	[10]
4	(United States) E Bektas (United Kingdom) T Moore	3	4
(Romania) G Talabă (Mexico) M Zacarías	6	6

Final
3	(Montenegro) V Babić (United States) C Whoriskey	6	6
(Romania) G Talabă (Mexico) M Zacarías	4	2
