= 2018 Central Coast Pro Tennis Open =

- Date: 24–30 September
- Edition: 2nd
- Category: ITF Women's Circuit
- Prize money: $60,000
- Surface: Hard
- Location: Templeton, United States

Champions

Singles
- (United States) Asia Muhammad

Doubles
- (United States) Asia Muhammad / (United States) Maria Sanchez
← 2017 ·	Central Coast Pro Tennis Open	· 2019 →

The 2018 Central Coast Pro Tennis Open was a professional tennis tournament played on outdoor hard courts. It was the second edition of the tournament and was part of the 2018 ITF Women's Circuit. It took place in Templeton, United States, on 24–30 September 2018.

== Singles main draw entrants ==
=== Seeds ===
Country	Player	Rank^{1}	Seed
USA	Taylor Townsend	64	1
USA	Madison Brengle	100	2
BRA	Beatriz Haddad Maia	126	3
USA	Jessica Pegula	141	4
USA	Kristie Ahn	142	5
RUS	Sofya Zhuk	148	6
CZE	Marie Bouzková	153	7
USA	Jamie Loeb	163	8

- ^{1} Rankings as of 17 September 2018.

=== Other entrants ===
The following players received a wildcard into the singles main draw:

- (United States) Danielle Lao
- (United States) Ann Li
- (United States) Taylor Townsend
- (United States) Sophia Whittle

The following players received entry into the singles main draw using a protected ranking:

- (Argentina) Nadia Podoroska

The following players received entry from the qualifying draw:

- (United States) Robin Anderson
- (United States) Maegan Manasse
- (Mexico) Giuliana Olmos
- (Switzerland) Amra Sadiković

== Champions ==
=== Singles ===
- (United States) Asia Muhammad def. (Bulgaria) Sesil Karatantcheva, 2–6, 6–4, 6–3

=== Doubles ===
- (United States) Asia Muhammad / (United States) Maria Sanchez def. (United States) Quinn Gleason / (Brazil) Luisa Stefani, 6–7^{(4–7)}, 6–2, [10–8]
