= 2022 Central Coast Pro Tennis Open – Doubles =

Doubles
- 2022 Central Coast Pro Tennis Open

Final
- Champions: (Japan) Nao Hibino (United States) Sabrina Santamaria
- Runners-up: (United States) Sophie Chang (Poland) Katarzyna Kawa
- Score: 6–4, 7–6^{(7–4)}

Events
Singles	Doubles
← 2019 ·	Central Coast Pro Tennis Open	· 2023 →

Vladica Babić and Caitlin Whoriskey were the defending champions but chose not to participate.

Nao Hibino and Sabrina Santamaria won the title, defeating Sophie Chang and Katarzyna Kawa in the final, 6–4, 7–6^{(7–4)}.

== Seeds ==
1. (United States) Sophie Chang / (Poland) Katarzyna Kawa (final)
2. (Japan) Nao Hibino / (United States) Sabrina Santamaria (champions)
3. (Netherlands) Arianne Hartono / (Australia) Astra Sharma (semifinals)
4. (United States) Robin Anderson / (Mexico) Renata Zarazúa (quarterfinals)

== Draw ==
=== Key ===
- Q = Qualifier
- WC = Wild card
- LL = Lucky loser
- Alt = Alternate
- SE = Special exempt
- PR = Protected ranking
- ITF = ITF entry
- JE = Junior exempt
- w/o = Walkover
- r = Retired
- d = Defaulted
- SR = Special ranking

=== Draw ===
First round
(United States) L Chirico (United States) G Min	6	6
(United States) H Abdelouahid (United States) Z Hitt	1	0
3	(Netherlands) A Hartono (Australia) A Sharma	7^{7}	6
(United States) K Hui (Ukraine) G Poznikhirenko	6^{5}	0
(United States) M Brengle (United States) W Osuigwe	7^{7}	3	[10]
(Philippines) A Eala (France) A Robbe	6^{3}	6	[6]
(Australia) A Osborne (Mexico) M Zacarías	6^{3}	6^{3}
(Japan) H Kuwata (Ukraine) K Volodko	7^{7}	7^{7}
(United States) M Aubuchon (United States) K Bunch	5	2
4	(United States) R Anderson (Mexico) R Zarazúa	7	6
(Latvia) De Marcinkēviča (Japan) H Sakatsume	3	5
(United States) M Mateas (Brazil) R Pereira	6	7
(United States) D Dunkle (United States) P Dunkle	1	0
2	(Japan) N Hibino (United States) S Santamaria	6	6

Quarterfinals
1	(United States) S Chang (Poland) K Kawa	6	6
(United States) L Chirico (United States) G Min	3	1
3	(Netherlands) A Hartono (Australia) A Sharma	6	4	[14]
(United States) M Brengle (United States) W Osuigwe	3	6	[12]
(Japan) H Kuwata (Ukraine) K Volodko	6	6
4	(United States) R Anderson (Mexico) R Zarazúa	4	3
(United States) M Mateas (Brazil) R Pereira	6	1	[6]
2	(Japan) N Hibino (United States) S Santamaria	4	6	[10]

Semifinals
1	(United States) S Chang (Poland) K Kawa	6^{5}	6	[10]
3	(Netherlands) A Hartono (Australia) A Sharma	7^{7}	0	[8]
(Japan) H Kuwata (Ukraine) K Volodko	4	4
2	(Japan) N Hibino (United States) S Santamaria	6	6

Final
1	(United States) S Chang (Poland) K Kawa	4	6^{4}
2	(Japan) N Hibino (United States) S Santamaria	6	7^{7}
