= 2018 Central Coast Pro Tennis Open – Doubles =

Doubles
- 2018 Central Coast Pro Tennis Open

Final
- Champions: (United States) Asia Muhammad (United States) Maria Sanchez
- Runners-up: (United States) Quinn Gleason (Brazil) Luisa Stefani
- Score: 6–7^{(4–7)}, 6–2, [10–8]

Events
| Singles | Doubles |
| ← 2017 · | Central Coast Pro Tennis Open | · 2019 → |

Kaitlyn Christian and Giuliana Olmos were the defending champions, but Christian chose not to participate. Olmos partnered alongside Kristie Ahn, but lost in the semifinals to Asia Muhammad and Maria Sanchez.

Muhammad and Sanchez went on to win the title, defeating Quinn Gleason and Luisa Stefani in the final, 6–7^{(4–7)}, 6–2, [10–8].

== Seeds ==
1. (United States) Asia Muhammad / (United States) Maria Sanchez (champions)
2. (United States) Madison Brengle / (United States) Jessica Pegula (quarterfinals)
3. (Serbia) Jovana Jakšić / (Sweden) Cornelia Lister (quarterfinals)
4. (Indonesia) Beatrice Gumulya / (Montenegro) Ana Veselinović (semifinals)

== Draw ==
=== Key ===
- Q = Qualifier
- WC = Wild card
- LL = Lucky loser
- Alt = Alternate
- SE = Special exempt
- PR = Protected ranking
- ITF = ITF entry
- JE = Junior exempt
- w/o = Walkover
- r = Retired
- d = Defaulted
- SR = Special ranking

=== Draw ===
First round
1 | (United States) A Muhammad (United States) M Sanchez | 6 | 6
PR | (Canada) S Fichman (United States) J Loeb | 4 | 2
(Indonesia) J Rompies (South Africa) C Simmonds | 3 | 6 | [10]
(Brazil) B Haddad Maia (Argentina) N Podoroska | 6 | 4 | [5]
3 | (Serbia) J Jakšić (Sweden) C Lister | 6 | 7
(United States) L Chirico (United States) L Davis | 4 | 5
(United States) K Ahn (Mexico) G Olmos | 3 | 7^{7} | [10]
(United Kingdom) T Moore (Switzerland) A Sadiković | 6 | 6^{3} | [7]
WC | (Peru) D Schaefer (United States) S Whittle | 6 | 6
WC | (United States) D Dunkle (United States) C Maddox | 4 | 2
(Brazil) PC Gonçalves (United States) S Marand | 6^{5} | 6^{5}
4 | (Indonesia) B Gumulya (Montenegro) A Veselinović | 7^{7} | 7^{7}
(Chinese Taipei) K-c Chang (Chinese Taipei) C-w Hsu | 2^{r}
(United States) Q Gleason (Brazil) L Stefani | 1
(Norway) U Eikeri (United States) A Kratzer | 0 | 1
2 | (United States) M Brengle (United States) J Pegula | 6 | 6

Quarterfinals
1 | (United States) A Muhammad (United States) M Sanchez | 6 | 7
(Indonesia) J Rompies (South Africa) C Simmonds | 2 | 5
3 | (Serbia) J Jakšić (Sweden) C Lister | 1 | 6 | [5]
(United States) K Ahn (Mexico) G Olmos | 6 | 3 | [10]
WC | (Peru) D Schaefer (United States) S Whittle | 4 | 5
4 | (Indonesia) B Gumulya (Montenegro) A Veselinović | 6 | 7
(United States) Q Gleason (Brazil) L Stefani | 7 | 6
2 | (United States) M Brengle (United States) J Pegula | 5 | 4

Semifinals
1 | (United States) A Muhammad (United States) M Sanchez | 6 | 2 | [10]
(United States) K Ahn (Mexico) G Olmos | 3 | 6 | [7]
4 | (Indonesia) B Gumulya (Montenegro) A Veselinović | 3 | 6^{3}
(United States) Q Gleason (Brazil) L Stefani | 6 | 7^{7}

Final
1 | (United States) A Muhammad (United States) M Sanchez | 6^{4} | 6 | [10]
(United States) Q Gleason (Brazil) L Stefani | 7^{7} | 2 | [8]
