= 2017 Central Coast Pro Tennis Open – Doubles =

Doubles
- 2017 Central Coast Pro Tennis Open

Final
- Champion: (United States) Kaitlyn Christian (Mexico) Giuliana Olmos
- Runner-up: (Switzerland) Viktorija Golubic (Switzerland) Amra Sadiković
- Score: 7–5, 6–3

Events
Singles	Doubles
Central Coast Pro Tennis Open	· 2018 →

This was the first edition of the tournament.

Kaitlyn Christian and Giuliana Olmos won the title after defeating Viktorija Golubic and Amra Sadiković 7–5, 6–3 in the final.

== Seeds ==
1. (Switzerland) Viktorija Golubic / (Switzerland) Amra Sadiković (final)
2. (Argentina) María Irigoyen / (Bulgaria) Elitsa Kostova (first round)
3. (United States) Jamie Loeb / (United States) Ashley Weinhold (first round)
4. (United States) Kaitlyn Christian / (Mexico) Giuliana Olmos (champions)

== Draw ==
=== Key ===
- Q = Qualifier
- WC = Wild card
- LL = Lucky loser
- Alt = Alternate
- SE = Special exempt
- PR = Protected ranking
- ITF = ITF entry
- JE = Junior exempt
- w/o = Walkover
- r = Retired
- d = Defaulted
- SR = Special ranking

First round
1	(Switzerland) V Golubic (Switzerland) A Sadiković	6^{1}	6	[10]
(United States) E Bektas (United States) S Santamaria	7^{7}	4	[6]
(United States) M Kobelt (South Africa) C Simmonds	7^{7}	6
(United States) L Chirico (United States) G Min	6^{2}	3
3	(United States) J Loeb (United States) A Weinhold	1	6	[8]
(Chile) A Guarachi (New Zealand) E Routliffe	6	3	[10]
(United States) S Kenin (United States) M Sanchez
(Norway) U Eikeri (Italy) C Rosatello	w/o
(United States) H Chang (United States) L Guillermo	6	6
WC	(United States) D Dunkle (United States) S Whittle	3	3
(United States) A Kratzer (United States) T Townsend	3	2
4	(United States) K Christian (Mexico) G Olmos	6	6
(Slovakia) AK Schmiedlová (United States) A Tatishvili	6	6
(United Kingdom) L Deigman (United States) S Schenck	2	0
(United States) Q Gleason (United States) S Marand	7	6
2	(Argentina) M Irigoyen (Bulgaria) E Kostova	5	2

Quarterfinals
1	(Switzerland) V Golubic (Switzerland) A Sadiković	6	6
(United States) M Kobelt (South Africa) C Simmonds	4	1
(Chile) A Guarachi (New Zealand) E Routliffe	6	6
(Norway) U Eikeri (Italy) C Rosatello	4	2
(United States) H Chang (United States) L Guillermo	3	7^{11}	[3]
4	(United States) K Christian (Mexico) G Olmos	6	6^{9}	[10]
(Slovakia) AK Schmiedlová (United States) A Tatishvili	6	5	[8]
(United States) Q Gleason (United States) S Marand	2	7	[10]

Semifinals
1	(Switzerland) V Golubic (Switzerland) A Sadiković	7	6
(Chile) A Guarachi (New Zealand) E Routliffe	5	4
4	(United States) K Christian (Mexico) G Olmos	6	6
(United States) Q Gleason (United States) S Marand	4	4

Final
1	(Switzerland) V Golubic (Switzerland) A Sadiković	5	3
4	(United States) K Christian (Mexico) G Olmos	7	6
