= 2023 Central Coast Pro Tennis Open – Doubles =

Doubles
- 2023 Central Coast Pro Tennis Open

Final
- Champions: (United States) McCartney Kessler (United States) Alana Smith
- Runners-up: (United States) Jessie Aney (United States) Jaeda Daniel
- Score: 7–5, 6–4

Events
Singles	Doubles
← 2022 ·	Central Coast Pro Tennis Open	· 2024 →

Nao Hibino and Sabrina Santamaria are the defending champions but chose not to participate.

McCartney Kessler and Alana Smith won the title, defeating Jessie Aney and Jaeda Daniel in the final, 7–5, 6–4.

== Seeds ==
1. (United States) Sophie Chang / (United States) Makenna Jones (quarterfinals)
2. Iryna Shymanovich / Anastasia Tikhonova (quarterfinals)
3. (Australia) Elysia Bolton / (Australia) Alexandra Bozovic (first round)
4. (United States) Maria Mateas / (United States) Anna Rogers (first round)

== Draw ==
=== Key ===
- Q = Qualifier
- WC = Wild card
- LL = Lucky loser
- Alt = Alternate
- SE = Special exempt
- PR = Protected ranking
- ITF = ITF entry
- JE = Junior exempt
- w/o = Walkover
- r = Retired
- d = Defaulted
- SR = Special ranking

=== Draw ===
First round
1	(United States) S Chang (United States) M Jones	6	7
WC	(Japan) A Miyamoto (Argentina) L Peyre	2	5
(United States) C Corley (United States) I Corley	1	2
M Kozyreva; V Miroshnichenko	6	6
4	(United States) M Mateas (United States) A Rogers	2	4
(United States) L Chirico (United States) A Li	6	6
WC	(United States) M Kessler (United States) A Smith	7^{10}	4	[10]
(United States) C Harrison (Canada) K Sebov	6^{8}	6	7
(Switzerland) L Sun (United States) K Volynets	w/o
(United States) R Anderson (Mexico) R Zarazúa
(United States) H Baptiste (United States) W Osuigwe	7^{7}	6
3	(Australia) E Bolton (Australia) A Bozovic	6^{1}	1
(United States) J Aney (United States) J Daniel	6	6
(Colombia) M Herazo González (Australia) A Osborne	4	2
(France) E Jacquemot (United States) E Kalieva
2	I Shymanovich; A Tikhonova	w/o

Quarterfinals
1	(United States) S Chang (United States) M Jones	1	6	[4]
M Kozyreva; V Miroshnichenko	6	1	[10]
(United States) L Chirico (United States) A Li	6^{2}	6	[4]
WC	(United States) M Kessler (United States) A Smith	7^{7}	3	[10]
(Switzerland) L Sun (United States) K Volynets	7	7
(United States) H Baptiste (United States) W Osuigwe	5	5
(United States) J Aney (United States) J Daniel	6	6
2	I Shymanovich; A Tikhonova	3	3

Semifinals
M Kozyreva; V Miroshnichenko	6	4	[7]
WC	(United States) M Kessler (United States) A Smith	1	6	[10]
(Switzerland) L Sun (United States) K Volynets	6^{r}
(United States) J Aney (United States) J Daniel	6

Final
WC	(United States) M Kessler (United States) A Smith	7	6
(United States) J Aney (United States) J Daniel	5	4
