= 2023 Central Coast Pro Tennis Open – Singles =

Singles
- 2023 Central Coast Pro Tennis Open

Final
- Champion: (United States) Taylor Townsend
- Runner-up: (Mexico) Renata Zarazúa
- Score: 6–3, 6–1

Events
Singles	Doubles
← 2022 ·	Central Coast Pro Tennis Open	· 2024 →

Madison Brengle was the defending champion but chose not to participate.

Taylor Townsend won the title, defeating Renata Zarazúa in the final, 6–3, 6–1.

== Seeds ==
1. (United States) Taylor Townsend (champion)
2. (United States) Katie Volynets (quarterfinals)
3. (Canada) Katherine Sebov (second round)
4. Iryna Shymanovich (semifinals)
5. (United States) Ann Li (quarterfinals)
6. (United States) Hailey Baptiste (second round)
7. (France) Elsa Jacquemot (second round)
8. (Mexico) Renata Zarazúa (final)

== Draw ==
=== Key ===
- Q = Qualifier
- WC = Wild card
- LL = Lucky loser
- Alt = Alternate
- SE = Special exempt
- PR = Protected ranking
- ITF = ITF entry
- JE = Junior exempt
- w/o = Walkover
- r = Retired
- d = Defaulted
- SR = Special ranking

=== Finals ===
Semifinals
1	(United States) Taylor Townsend	7	6
WC	(United States) McCartney Kessler	5	4
4	Iryna Shymanovich	3	4
8	(Mexico) Renata Zarazúa	6	6

Final
1	(United States) Taylor Townsend	6	6
8	(Mexico) Renata Zarazúa	3	1

=== Top half ===
First round
1	(United States) T Townsend	6	6
(United States) J Loeb	3	2
SE	(Canada) M Stakusic	6	6
(United States) E Kalieva	4	0
(United States) L Chirico	2
Q	(Ukraine) H Poznikhirenko	3^{r}
(United States) L Hovde	6	6^{1}	0
5	(United States) A Li	3	7^{7}	6
3	(Canada) K Sebov	6	6
Q	(Argentina) MS Krywoj	0	3
(France) K Mladenovic	3	4
Q	(United States) H Chang	6	6
Q	(United States) C Corley	3	2
WC	(United States) M Kessler	6	6
Q	V Miroshnichenko	6^{7}	6	4
6	(United States) H Baptiste	7^{9}	1	6

Second round
1	(United States) T Townsend	w/o
SE	(Canada) M Stakusic
(United States) L Chirico	5	2
5	(United States) A Li	7	6
3	(Canada) K Sebov	2	6	3
Q	(United States) H Chang	6	0	6
WC	(United States) M Kessler	3	6	6
6	(United States) H Baptiste	6	3	1

Quarterfinals
1	(United States) T Townsend	4	6	6
5	(United States) A Li	6	2	2
Q	(United States) H Chang	5	2
WC	(United States) M Kessler	7	6

Semifinals
1	(United States) T Townsend	7	6
WC	(United States) M Kessler	5	4

=== Bottom half ===
First round
7	(France) E Jacquemot	5	7^{7}	6
(Switzerland) L Sun	7	6^{3}	3
Q	(Argentina) L Peyre	1	3
(United States) M Jones	6	6
LL	(United States) J Aney	0	0
Q	(United States) C Harrison	6	6
WC	(United States) R Anderson	3	1
4	I Shymanovich	6	6
8	(Mexico) R Zarazúa	7^{8}	7^{7}
WC	(United States) W Osuigwe	6^{6}	6^{5}
A Tikhonova	7	6^{3}	6
T Prozorova	5	7^{7}	3
WC	(United States) S Chang	6	7
(Canada) S Fung	4	5
Q	(Australia) A Bozovic	6	2	4
2	(United States) K Volynets	3	6	6

Second round
7	(France) E Jacquemot	7^{7}	4	5
(United States) M Jones	6^{5}	6	7
Q	(United States) C Harrison	0	6^{2}
4	I Shymanovich	6	7^{7}
8	(Mexico) R Zarazúa	6	0	6
A Tikhonova	3	6	1
WC	(United States) S Chang	4	3
2	(United States) K Volynets	6	6

Quarterfinals
(United States) M Jones	3	6^{6}
4	I Shymanovich	6	7^{8}
8	(Mexico) R Zarazúa	6	4	6
2	(United States) K Volynets	4	6	0

Semifinals
4	I Shymanovich	3	4
8	(Mexico) R Zarazúa	6	6
