= 2017 Central Coast Pro Tennis Open – Singles =

Singles
- 2017 Central Coast Pro Tennis Open

Final
- Champion: (United States) Sachia Vickery
- Runner-up: (United States) Jamie Loeb
- Score: 6–1, 6–2

Events
Singles	Doubles
Central Coast Pro Tennis Open	· 2018 →

This was the first edition of the tournament.

Sachia Vickery won the title after defeating Jamie Loeb 6–1, 6–2 in the final.

== Seeds ==
1. (Switzerland) Viktorija Golubic (semifinals)
2. (United States) Sofia Kenin (first round, retired)
3. (Canada) Françoise Abanda (first round)
4. (United States) Sachia Vickery (champion)
5. (United States) Taylor Townsend (semifinals)
6. (United Kingdom) Naomi Broady (second round)
7. (Slovakia) Anna Karolína Schmiedlová (second round)
8. (United States) Jamie Loeb (final)

== Draw ==
=== Key ===
- Q = Qualifier
- WC = Wild card
- LL = Lucky loser
- Alt = Alternate
- SE = Special exempt
- PR = Protected ranking
- ITF = ITF entry
- JE = Junior exempt
- w/o = Walkover
- r = Retired
- d = Defaulted
- SR = Special ranking

=== Finals ===
Semifinals
1	(Switzerland) Viktorija Golubic	6	6^{3}	3
4	(United States) Sachia Vickery	4	7^{7}	6
5/WC	(United States) Taylor Townsend	4	7^{9}	6^{6}
8	(United States) Jamie Loeb	6	6^{7}	7^{8}

Final
4	(United States) Sachia Vickery	6	6
8	(United States) Jamie Loeb	1	2

=== Top half ===
First round
1	(Switzerland) V Golubic	7^{8}	6
(United States) A Kratzer	6^{6}	4
SE	(United States) E Bektas	2	6^{5}
WC	(United States) Q Gleason	6	7^{7}
(United Kingdom) K Boulter	6	5	2
SE	(United States) M Sanchez	4	7	6
(Bulgaria) S Karatantcheva	0	1
6	(United Kingdom) N Broady	6	6
4	(United States) S Vickery	6	6
(Switzerland) A Sadiković	3	3
(United States) D Lao	3	4
(Japan) M Osaka	6	6
(New Zealand) M Erakovic	6	6
(United States) G Min	0	4
(South Africa) C Simmonds	4	3
7	(Slovakia) AK Schmiedlová	6	6

Second round
1	(Switzerland) V Golubic	6	6
WC	(United States) Q Gleason	1	1
SE	(United States) M Sanchez	6	2	7
6	(United Kingdom) N Broady	3	6	5
4	(United States) S Vickery	3	6	6
(Japan) M Osaka	6	4	4
(New Zealand) M Erakovic	6	6
7	(Slovakia) AK Schmiedlová	4	2

Quarterfinals
1	(Switzerland) V Golubic	6	7^{7}
SE	(United States) M Sanchez	1	6^{3}
4	(United States) S Vickery	6	6
(New Zealand) M Erakovic	4	3

Semifinals
1	(Switzerland) V Golubic	6	6^{3}	3
4	(United States) S Vickery	4	7^{7}	6

=== Bottom half ===
First round
5/WC	(United States) T Townsend	6	6
Q	(United States) A Tatishvili	1	0
(United States) L Chirico	3	6	6
(Norway) U Eikeri	6	2	2
(United Kingdom) L Robson	6	6
(Italy) C Rosatello	1	0
WC	(United States) S Whittle	6	6
3	(Canada) F Abanda	2	3
8	(United States) J Loeb	7	6
WC	(United States) R Anderson	5	4
(Russia) A Potapova	1	2
Q	(Russia) E Bovina	6	6
(Bulgaria) E Kostova	6	6
Q	(United States) S Santamaria	1	3
Q	(Russia) A Kleybanova	6	5	5
2	(United States) S Kenin	4	7	0^{r}

Second round
5/WC	(United States) T Townsend	6	6
(United States) L Chirico	2	1
(United Kingdom) L Robson	7^{7}	6
WC	(United States) S Whittle	6^{1}	0
8	(United States) J Loeb	6	6
Q	(Russia) E Bovina	1	3
(Bulgaria) E Kostova	6	3	6
Q	(Russia) A Kleybanova	4	6	2

Quarterfinals
5/WC	(United States) T Townsend	6	6
(United Kingdom) L Robson	1	3
8	(United States) J Loeb	6	6
(Bulgaria) E Kostova	2	4

Semifinals
5/WC	(United States) T Townsend	4	7^{9}	6^{6}
8	(United States) J Loeb	6	6^{7}	7^{8}
