= Sachia Vickery =

American and Guyanese tennis player

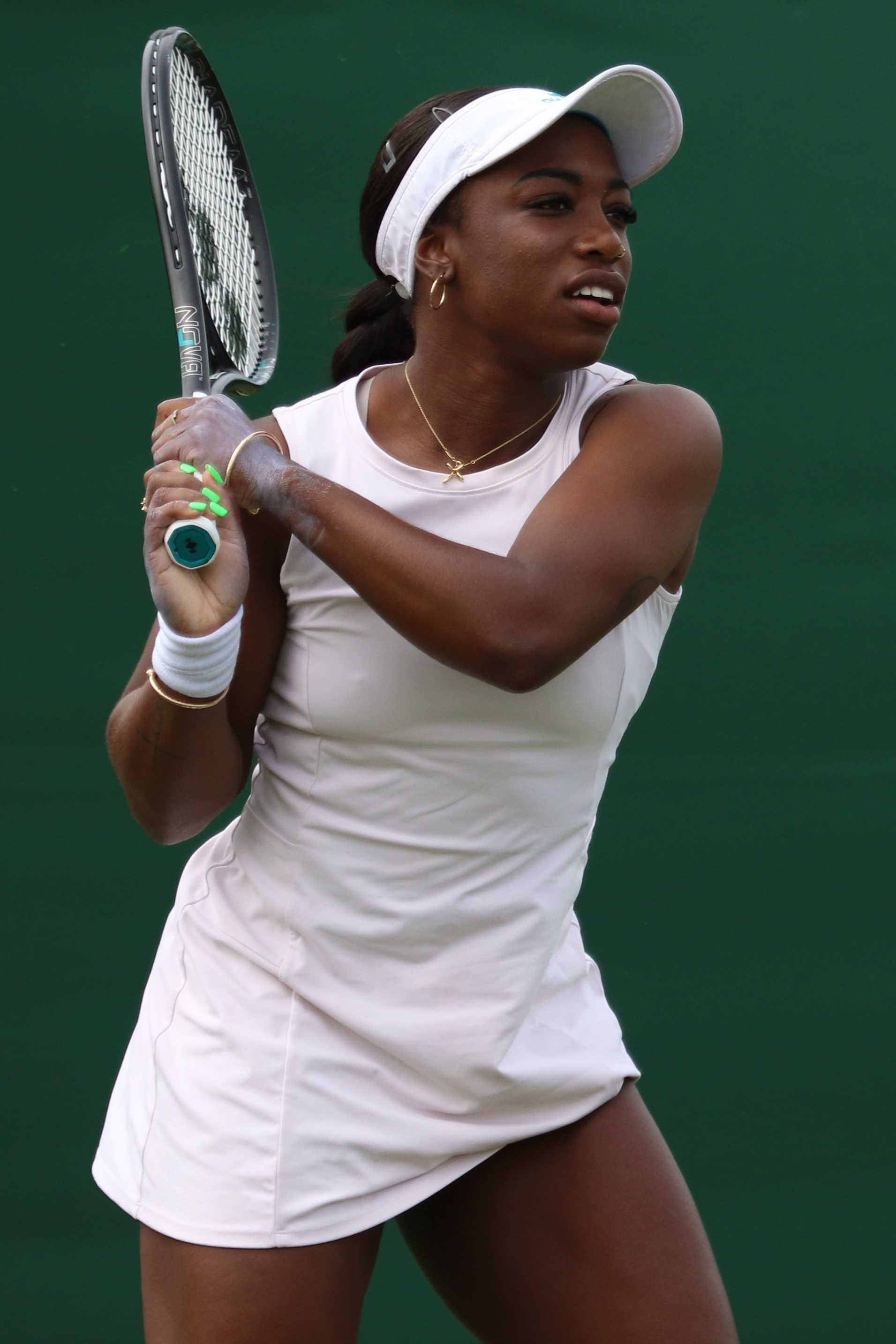
- Vickery at the 2023 Wimbledon Championships
- Country (sports): United States (2011–26); Guyana (2026–present)
- Residence: Hollywood, Florida, US
- Born: May 11, 1995 (age 31) Miramar, Florida, US
- Height: 1.63 m (5 ft 4 in)
- Turned pro: 2011
- Plays: Right (two-handed backhand)
- Coach: Nabil Badek
- Prize money: US$ 2,173,289

Singles
- Career record: 380–308
- Career titles: 3 ITF
- Highest ranking: No. 73 (July 30, 2018)
- Current ranking: No. 509 (July 21, 2025)

Grand Slam singles results
- Australian Open: 2R (2019)
- French Open: 1R (2016, 2018, 2024)
- Wimbledon: 2R (2018)
- US Open: 2R (2013, 2017, 2020, 2023)

Doubles
- Career record: 53–74
- Career titles: 3 ITF
- Highest ranking: No. 225 (August 12, 2019)

Grand Slam doubles results
- Wimbledon: 2R (2018)
- US Open: 1R (2018)

Grand Slam mixed doubles results
- US Open: 2R (2021)
- Last updated on: July 26, 2025.

Sachia Vickery (/ˈsɑːʃə/ SAH-shə; born May 11, 1995) is an American-born Guyanese professional tennis player. She reached a career-high of No. 73 in the WTA rankings on July 30, 2018. Vickery, a former USTA junior national champion, has also won three singles and three doubles titles on the ITF Circuit.

Her best results on the WTA Tour came at the 2018 Auckland Open and the 2018 Monterrey Open, where she reached the semifinals. In September 2026, she changed her sporting affiliation to Guyana to compete at the South American Games, with the aim of qualifying for the 2028 Summer Olympics.

== Early life and background ==
Vickery was born in Florida to Paula Liverpool and Rawle Vickery. Her parents had both lived in Linden, the second largest city in the Caribbean nation of Guyana, and her mother is originally from the small mining town of Kwakwani. Her mother ran track in high school and her father was a professional soccer player. She also has an older brother named Dominique Mitchell who played college football at South Carolina State University. Through her former stepfather Derrick Mitchell, she is acquainted with LeBron James and considers his mother Gloria to be "like an aunt to her."

Her parents divorced when she was young, leaving Liverpool to raise her as a single mother. Her mother, who had been a school teacher in Guyana, at one point worked full-time during the day in the admissions office at Kaplan University and full-time at night as a bartender in a dangerous part of Miami to help pay for Vickery's tennis lessons. Once Vickery started to produce strong results at junior tournaments, she began training at the IMG Academy. While she was in Miami, she also worked with Richard Williams, the father of Venus and Serena, for a summer. After a year, she then moved to France to train at the Mouratoglou Tennis Academy for several years. By the time she was 18, she had moved back to Florida to be at the USTA National Training Center in Boca Raton.

== Juniors ==
Vickery reached a career-high ITF junior ranking of No. 6 in the world. She recorded her first big result on the junior circuit when she reached the final of the Grade 1 USTA International Spring Championships in 2010 at 14 years old. The following year, she reached the semifinals of the Orange Bowl. To start the 2012 season, Vickery picked up her only Grade 1-tournament win at the Copa del Cafe in Costa Rica. She played in her last ITF junior tournament that November. Vickery finished her junior career by winning both the singles and doubles titles at the USTA Junior National Championship the following summer, which also clinched her two wildcards into the singles and doubles main draws at the US Open.

== Professional ==
=== Early years ===
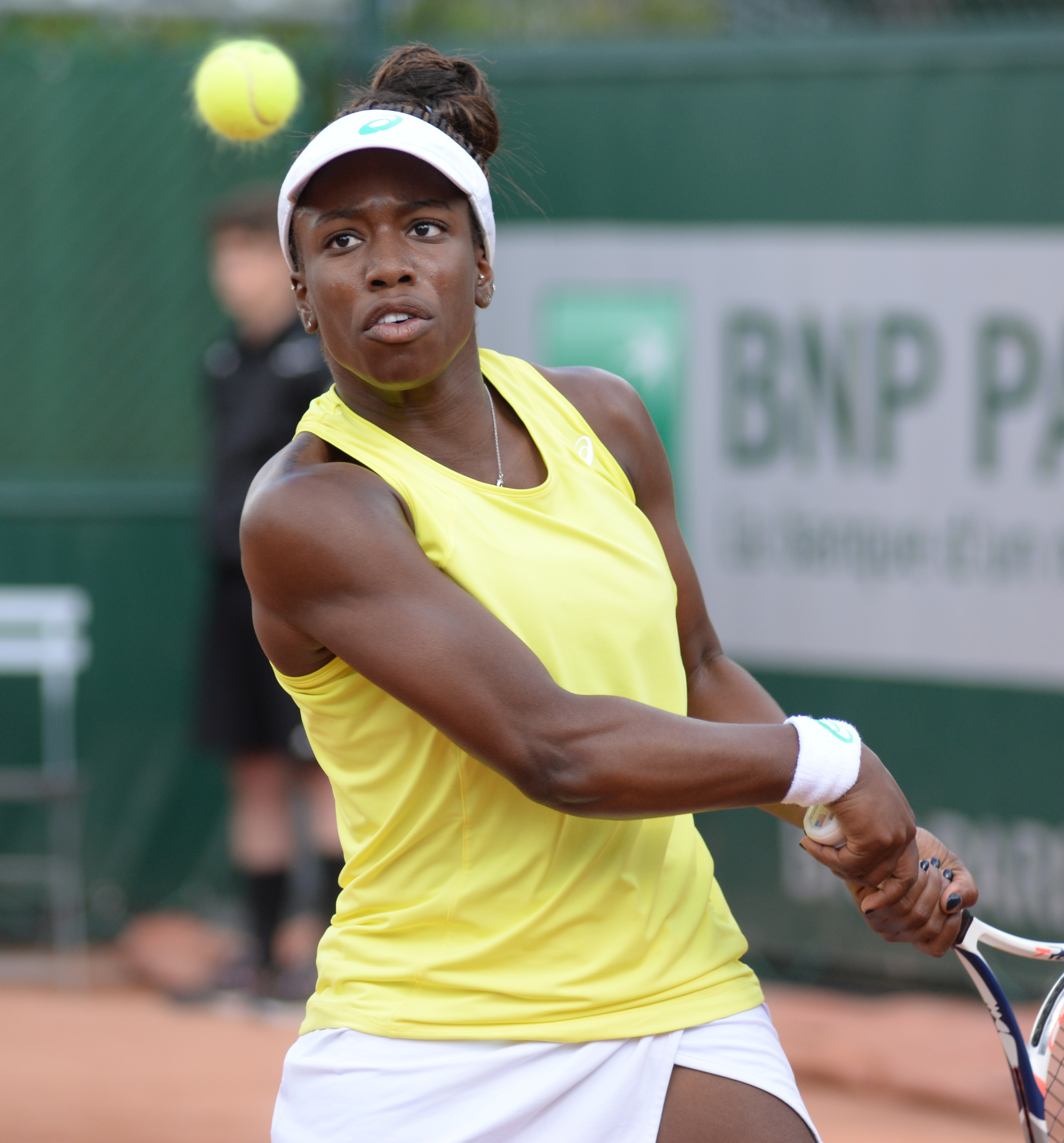
Sachia Vickery at 2015 French Open qualifying

Vickery played her first professional-level match in 2009 at an $10k tournament in Evansville, where she reached the semifinals. In 2011, she was awarded a wildcard into qualifying at the Washington Open but lost her first match.

As the 2013 USTA Junior National Champion, Vickery ear WTA Tour-level win in her first tour-level match. This put Vickery into the top 200 of the WTA rankings for the first time. She would consistently remain in the top 200 for the next four and a half years, aside for two weeks in 2016, but did not move into the top 100 until March 2018.

In 2014, Vickery earned another main-draw wildcard, this time for the Australian Open. She would go on to lose in the first round to fellow American Lauren Davis. Early in 2015, Vickery won her first two ITF Women's Circuit titles in back-to-back weeks in her home state of Florida, both of which came on clay. Vickery made two Tour quarterfinal appearances over these two years, one at Stanford in 2014 and another at Nottingham in 2015. She reached the main draw through qualifying at both events. Vickery also qualified for the main draw at Wimbledon in 2015 and the French Open in 2016.

Vickery made it through qualifying at the US Open and defeated Natalia Vikhlyantseva in the first round for her first major main-draw match win in four years. She followed this up with the biggest tournament win of her career at the Central Coast Pro Tennis Open, a $60k event.

=== 2018: Top 100 ===
At the Auckland Open in January, Vickery made it to her first WTA Tour semifinal, the best result of her career. She knocked out defending champion Lauren Davis and former world No. 2, Agnieszka Radwańska, along the way before losing to world No. 2, Caroline Wozniacki.

She backed up this performance by qualifying for the main draw of the Indian Wells Open, where she upset world No. 3, Garbiñe Muguruza, for the biggest win of her career. She then lost to the eventual champion Naomi Osaka, in the third round. Before the tournament, she had been ranked for the first time in the top 100. With the result, she rose to a new career-high of No. 89 in the world.

Vickery closed out the early-year hardcourt season by reaching her second semifinal, this time at the Monterrey Open.

=== 2023–2024: Major and WTA 1000 wins ===
At the WTA 1000 2023 Guadalajara Open, she entered as a lucky loser replacing Beatriz Haddad Maia and recorded a first-round win over compatriot Danielle Collins who retired after the first set.

In February 2024, she qualified for the ATX Open and defeated qualifier Rebecca Marino. In April, she also qualified for the WTA 500 2024 Charleston Open. Ranked No. 134, at the next WTA 500, the 2024 Porsche Tennis Grand Prix in Stuttgart, she qualified for the main draw and defeated qualifier Aliaksandra Sasnovich, before losing to third seed Coco Gauff in three sets.

Vickery earned a 2024 French Open singles main-draw entry by winning the USTA's reciprocal wildcard in the Roland Garros Wild Card Challenge.

At the WTA 500 Guadalajara Open, she entered again as a lucky loser for a second consecutive year, replacing Taylor Townsend.

== Performance timelines ==
Key
W	F	SF	QF	#R	RR	Q#	P#	DNQ	A	Z#	PO	G	S	B	NMS	NTI	P	NH

(W) winner; (F) finalist; (SF) semifinalist; (QF) quarterfinalist; (#R) rounds 4, 3, 2, 1; (RR) round-robin stage; (Q#) qualification round; (P#) preliminary round; (DNQ) did not qualify; (A) absent; (Z#) Davis/Fed Cup Zonal Group (with number indication) or (PO) play-off; (G) gold, (S) silver or (B) bronze Olympic/Paralympic medal; (NMS) not a Masters tournament; (NTI) not a Tier I tournament; (P) postponed; (NH) not held; (SR) strike rate (events won / competed); (W–L) win–loss record.
To avoid confusion and double counting, these charts are updated at the conclusion of a tournament or when the player's participation has ended.

Only main-draw results in WTA Tour, Grand Slam tournaments, Fed Cup/Billie Jean King Cup and Olympic Games are included in win–loss records.

=== Singles ===
Current through the 2024 French Open.

Tournament	2013	2014	2015	2016	2017	2018	2019	2020	2021	2022	2023	2024	SR	W–L	Win%
Grand Slam tournaments
Australian Open	A	1R	A	Q3	Q1	Q1	2R	Q3	Q2	Q1	Q3	Q1	0 / 2	1–2	33%
French Open	A	Q1	Q1	1R	Q1	1R	Q2	Q1	Q1	Q1	Q2	1R	0 / 3	0–3	0%
Wimbledon	A	Q1	1R	Q1	Q2	2R	Q1	NH	Q2	Q2	Q1	Q2	0 / 2	1–2	33%
US Open	2R	Q1	1R	Q1	2R	1R	Q2	2R	Q2	Q3	2R	Q1	0 / 6	4–6	40%
Win–loss	1–1	0–1	0–2	0–1	1–1	1–3	1–1	1–1	0–0	0–0	1–1	0–1	0 / 13	6–13	32%
WTA 1000 tournaments
Indian Wells Open	Q1	A	2R	Q1	Q2	3R	1R	NH	Q1	A	A	A	0 / 3	3–3	50%
Miami Open	A	A	Q1	Q2	Q1	Q1	1R	NH	A	A	A	A	0 / 1	0–1	0%
Madrid Open	A	A	A	A	A	Q2	A	NH	A	A	A	Q2	0 / 0	0–0	–
Italian Open	A	A	A	A	A	A	A	A	A	A	Q1	Q1	0 / 0	0–0	–
Canadian Open	A	A	Q1	Q1	1R	Q2	Q2	NH	A	A	Q2		0 / 1	0–1	0%
Cincinnati Open	A	Q1	Q1	A	A	Q1	A	A	A	A	A		0 / 0	0–0	–
Wuhan Open	NH	A	A	A	A	A	Q1	NH					0 / 0	0–0	–
Guadalajara Open	NH									Q1	2R	NTI	0 / 1	1–1	50%
Win–loss	0–0	0–0	1–1	0–0	0–1	2–1	0–2	0–0	0–0	0–0	1–1	0–0	0 / 6	4–6	40%
Career statistics
Tournaments	1	5	7	5	5	11	7	1	1	1	6	5	Career total: 55		
Overall win–loss	1–1	2–5	5–7	4–5	5–5	9–11	4–7	1–1	0–1	0–1	4–6	2–5	0 / 55	37–55	40%
Year-end ranking	190	195	130	141	116	96	158	158	220	190	147				

== ITF Circuit finals ==
=== Singles: 10 (3 titles, 7 runner-ups) ===
Legend W60 tournaments (1–3) W25 tournaments (2–3) W10 tournaments (0–1)	Finals by surface Hard (1–7) Clay (2–0)

Result	W–L	Date	Tournament	Tier	Surface	Opponent	Score
Loss	0–1	Jan 2011	ITF Le Gosier, Guadeloupe	W10	Hard	(United States) Gail Brodsky	3–6, 6–2, 2–6
Win	1–1	Jan 2015	ITF Plantation, United States	W25	Clay	(United States) Samantha Crawford	6–3, 6–1
Win	2–1	Jan 2015	ITF Surprise, United States	W25	Clay	(Spain) Sara Sorribes Tormo	6–2, 2–6, 6–3
Loss	2–2	Oct 2016	ITF Redding, United States	W25	Hard	(Canada) Françoise Abanda	6–3, 4–6, 4–6
Win	3–2	Oct 2017	Templeton Pro Open, United States	W60	Hard	(United States) Jamie Loeb	6–1, 6–2
Loss	3–3	Nov 2017	ITF Norman, United States	W25	Hard	(United States) Danielle Collins	6–1, 3–6, 4–6
Loss	3–4	Jan 2020	Burnie International, Australia	W60	Hard	(Australia) Maddison Inglis	6–2, 3–6, 5–7
Loss	3–5	Feb 2022	ITF Santo Domingo, Dominican Rep.	W25	Hard	(United Kingdom) Katie Swan	4–6, 3–6
Loss	3–6	May 2022	ITF Orlando Pro, United States	W60	Hard	(United States) Robin Anderson	5–7, 4–6
Loss	3–7	Jul 2022	Evansville Classic, United States	W60	Hard	(United States) Ashlyn Krueger	3–6, 5–7

=== Doubles: 6 (3 titles, 3 runner-ups) ===
Legend $100,000 tournaments (1–1) $60,000 tournaments (1–1) $25,000 tournaments (1–1)	Finals by surface Hard (2–2) Clay (1–1)

Result	W–L	Date	Tournament	Tier	Surface	Partner	Opponents	Score
Win	1–0	Feb 2013	ITF Surprise, US	W25	Hard	(United States) Samantha Crawford	(United States) Emily Harman (China) Xu Yifan	6–3, 3–6, [10–7]
Loss	1–1	Mar 2014	ITF Innisbrook, US	W25	Clay	(United States) Allie Kiick	(Italy) Gioia Barbieri (United States) Julia Cohen	6–7^{(5)}, 0–6
Loss	1–2	Jul 2014	Carson Challenger, US	W60	Hard	(United States) Samantha Crawford	(Netherlands) Michaëlla Krajicek (Australia) Olivia Rogowska	6–7^{(4)}, 1–6
Loss	1–3	Feb 2015	Midland Tennis Classic, US	W100	Hard (i)	(United States) Jacqueline Cako	(France) Julie Coin (United Kingdom) Emily Webley-Smith	6–4, 6–7, [9–11]
Win	2–3	Jul 2019	Berkeley Challenge, US	W60	Hard	(United States) Madison Brengle	(United States) Francesca Di Lorenzo (United Kingdom) Katie Swan	6–3, 7–5
Win	3–3	Jul 2022	ITF Charleston Pro, US	W100	Clay	(United States) Alycia Parks	(Hungary) Tímea Babos (Mexico) Marcela Zacarías	6–4, 5–7, [10–5]

== Head-to-head-record ==
=== Wins over top 10 players ===
#	Player	Rank	Event	Surface	Rd	Score	SVR
2018
1.	(Spain) Garbiñe Muguruza	No. 3	Indian Wells Open, US	Hard	2R	2–6, 7–5, 6–1	No. 100
