= 2025 Central Coast Pro Tennis Open =

Tennis tournament

- Date: 22–28 September 2025
- Edition: 7th
- Category: ITF Women's World Tennis Tour
- Prize money: $60,000
- Surface: Hard / Outdoor
- Location: Templeton, California, United States

Champions

Singles
- (United States) Kayla Day

Doubles
- Maria Kozyreva / (Slovakia) Martina Okáľová
← 2024 ·	Central Coast Pro Tennis Open	· 2026 →

The 2025 Central Coast Pro Tennis Open is a professional tennis tournament played on outdoor hard courts. It is the seventh edition of the tournament which is part of the 2025 ITF Women's World Tennis Tour. It take place in Templeton, California, United States between 22 and 28 September 2025.

== Champions ==
=== Singles ===
- (United States) Kayla Day def. (Canada) Kayla Cross, 6–2, 3–0 ret.

=== Doubles ===
- Maria Kozyreva / (Slovakia) Martina Okáľová vs. (United States) Usue Maitane Arconada / (Slovakia) Viktória Hrunčáková, 6–2, 7–5

== Singles main draw entrants ==
=== Seeds ===
Country	Player	Rank^{1}	Seed
USA	Louisa Chirico	154	1
JPN	Himeno Sakatsume	196	2
CAN	Cadence Brace	205	3
SVK	Viktória Hrunčáková	225	4
CAN	Kayla Cross	249	5
USA	Fiona Crawley	274	6
AUS	Olivia Gadecki	295	7
UKR	Valeriya Strakhova	304	8

- ^{1} Rankings are as of 15 September 2025.

=== Other entrants ===
The following players received wildcards into the singles main draw:

- (United States) Jenna DeFalco
- (United States) Salma Ewing
- (United States) Katrina Scott

The following players received entry from the qualifying draw:

- (United Kingdom) Victoria Allen
- (Venezuela) Sofía Elena Cabezas Domínguez
- Maria Kozyreva
- Evialina Laskevich
- (Poland) Olivia Lincer
- (Slovakia) Martina Okáľová
- (Mexico) María Portillo Ramírez
- (United States) Brandy Walker
