= Martina Okáľová =

Slovak tennis player

- Country (sports): Slovakia
- Born: 5 June 1997 (age 28) Banská Bystrica, Slovakia
- Plays: Right-handed
- Prize money: $60,620

Singles
- Career record: 143–102
- Career titles: 1 ITF
- Highest ranking: No. 372 (22 September 2025)
- Current ranking: No. 411 (29 December 2025)

Doubles
- Career record: 38–53
- Career titles: 1 ITF
- Highest ranking: No. 282 (6 October 2025)
- Current ranking: No. 384 (29 December 2025)
- Last updated on: 29 December 2025.

Martina Okáľová (born 5 June 1997) is a Slovak tennis player.

Okáľová has a career-high singles ranking by the WTA of 372, achieved on 22 September 2025, and a best doubles ranking of world No. 282, achieved on 6 October 2025.

Okáľová played at the Tulsa Golden Hurricane between 2016 and 2021 in the NCAA tennis championships.

== Career ==
She made her WTA Tour main-draw debut at the 2025 SP Open, where she won first round match against Arina Rodionova as a qualifier.

== ITF Circuit finals ==
=== Singles: 1 (title) ===
Legend W15 tournaments (1–0)	Finals by surface Hard (1–0)

Result	W–L	Date	Tournament	Tier	Surface	Opponent	Score
Win	1–0	Nov 2022	ITF Waco, United States	W15	Hard	(United States) Victoria Hu	6–3, 6–2

=== Doubles: 1 (title) ===
Legend W75 tournaments	Finals by surface Hard (1–0)

Result	W–L	Date	Tournament	Tier	Surface	Partner	Opponents	Score
Win	1–0	Sep 2025	ITF Templeton, United States	W75	Hard	Maria Kozyreva	(United States) Usue Maitane Arconada (Slovakia) Viktória Hrunčáková	6–2, 7–5
