= Central Coast Pro Tennis Open =

- 2025 Central Coast Pro Tennis Open

ITF Women's Tour
- Event name: Templeton
- Location: Templeton, United States
- Venue: Templeton Tennis Ranch
- Category: ITF Women's Circuit
- Surface: Hard
- Draw: 32S/32Q/16D
- Prize money: $60,000
- Website: ttrprotennis.com

The Central Coast Pro Tennis Open is a tournament for professional female tennis players played on outdoor hardcourt courts. The event is classified as a $60,000 ITF Women's Circuit tournament and has been held in Templeton, United States, since 2017.

== Past finals ==
=== Singles ===
Year	Champion	Runner-up	Score
2025	(United States) Kayla Day	(Canada) Kayla Cross	6–2, 3–0 ret.
2024	(Mexico) Renata Zarazúa	(United States) Usue Maitane Arconada	6–4, 6–3
2023	(United States) Taylor Townsend	(Mexico) Renata Zarazúa	6–3, 6–1
2022	(United States) Madison Brengle	(United States) Robin Montgomery	4–6, 6–4, 6–2
2020–21	Tournament cancelled due to the COVID-19 pandemic		
2019	(United States) Shelby Rogers	(United States) CoCo Vandeweghe	4–6, 6–2, 6–3
2018	(United States) Asia Muhammad	(Bulgaria) Sesil Karatantcheva	2–6, 6–4, 6–3
2017	(United States) Sachia Vickery	(United States) Jamie Loeb	6–1, 6–2

=== Doubles ===
Year	Champions	Runners-up	Score
2025	Maria Kozyreva (Slovakia) Martina Okáľová	(United States) Usue Maitane Arconada (Slovakia) Viktória Hrunčáková	6–2, 7–5
2024	(United States) Sophie Chang (United States) Rasheeda McAdoo	(United States) Carmen Corley (Canada) Rebecca Marino	1–6, 6–2, [10–4]
2023	(United States) McCartney Kessler (United States) Alana Smith	(United States) Jessie Aney (United States) Jaeda Daniel	7–5, 6–4
2022	(Japan) Nao Hibino (United States) Sabrina Santamaria	(United States) Sophie Chang (Poland) Katarzyna Kawa	6–4, 7–6^{(7–4)}
2020–21	Tournament cancelled due to the COVID-19 pandemic		
2019	(Montenegro) Vladica Babić (United States) Caitlin Whoriskey	(Romania) Gabriela Talabă (Mexico) Marcela Zacarías	6–4, 6–2
2018	(United States) Asia Muhammad (United States) Maria Sanchez	(United States) Quinn Gleason (Brazil) Luisa Stefani	6–7^{(4–7)}, 6–2, [10–8]
2017	(United States) Kaitlyn Christian (Mexico) Giuliana Olmos	(Switzerland) Viktorija Golubic (Switzerland) Amra Sadiković	7–5, 6–3
