= Kayla Day =

American tennis player (born 1999)

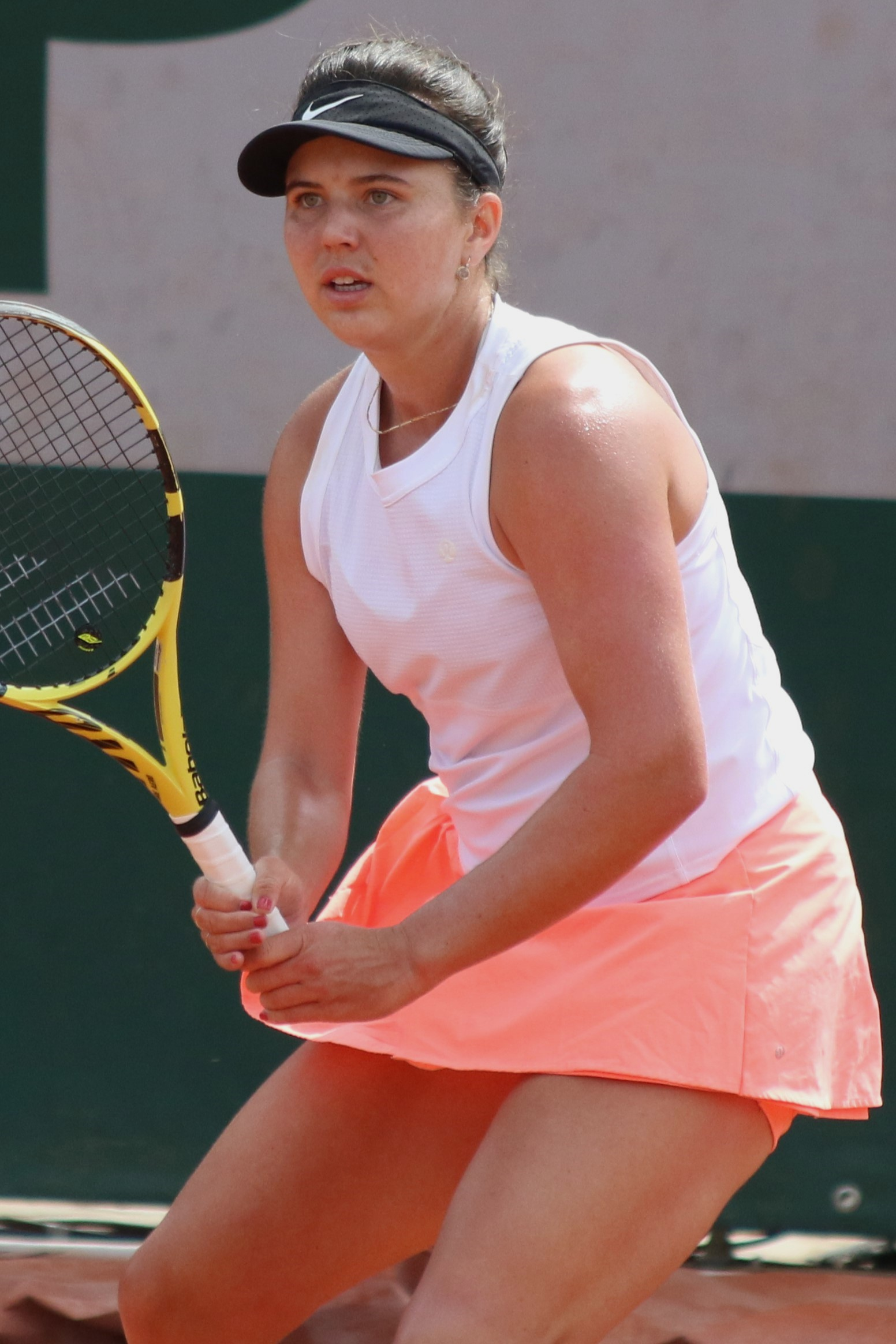
- Day at the 2023 French Open
- Country (sports): United States
- Residence: Lake Nona, Florida, US
- Born: September 28, 1999 (age 27) Santa Barbara, California, US
- Height: 1.73 m (5 ft 8 in)
- Turned pro: 2017
- Plays: Left (two-handed backhand)
- Coach: Pat Cash
- Prize money: US$ 1,395,371

Singles
- Career record: 293–212
- Career titles: 0 WTA, 10 ITF
- Highest ranking: No. 84 (April 1, 2024)
- Current ranking: No. 136 (June 8, 2026)

Grand Slam singles results
- Australian Open: 1R (2017, 2024)
- French Open: 3R (2023)
- Wimbledon: 1R (2026)
- US Open: 2R (2016)

Doubles
- Career record: 45–42
- Career titles: 4 ITF
- Highest ranking: No. 133 (January 29, 2018)
- Current ranking: No. 600 (June 8, 2026)

Grand Slam doubles results
- Australian Open: 1R (2024)
- US Open: 2R (2017)
- Last updated on: June 11, 2026.

Kayla Day (born September 28, 1999) is an American professional tennis player. She has a career-high singles ranking of world No. 84 by the WTA, reached in April 2024. As a junior, she won the 2016 US Open in singles and was a finalist in doubles, partnering with Caroline Dolehide.

Day plays mostly on the ITF Women's Circuit and the WTA 125 Challenger Tour.

== Early life and background ==
Day started playing tennis when she was seven years old. Her mother is from the Czech Republic.

== Juniors ==
She was No. 1 in the girls' 12s, 14s, 16s, and 18s national US rankings. In 2016, Day climbed to the top of the ITF junior rankings by winning the 2016 Junior US Open, reaching semifinals at the 2016 Wimbledon, and reaching the final at the Orange Bowl the previous year. She also achieved her best doubles result at a major event as a runner-up at the 2016 Junior US Open with partner Caroline Dolehide. She won the 2016 USTA Girls 18s National Championships to earn a wildcard into the main draw of the US Open. Day has been coached from the beginning by Larry Mousouris, who has coached two other Junior US Open winners, Michael Falberg and Tim Trigueiro.

== Professional ==
=== 2016-2018: Turned pro, first title, major & Premier debuts ===
Day made her WTA Tour debut at the 2016 Connecticut Open in New Haven, after reaching the main draw as a lucky loser, having defeated Naomi Broady and Kirsten Flipkens along the way. The following week, she played in her first career Grand Slam at the 2016 US Open, and won her first match against compatriot Madison Brengle.

Shortly after turning 17, Day won her first career title at the 50k tournament in Macon, Georgia. The following week at Scottsdale, she reached the semifinals to enter the top 200 for the first time. With her combined performance at these two events, she won the Australian Open Wild Card Challenge to earn a spot in the main draw at the first major event of 2017. She officially turned professional in 2017, at the Australian Open. Day picked up her first WTA Tour wins of the 2017 season, and first wins of her career at a Premier Mandatory event in Indian Wells, including a victory over 2017 Australian Open semifinalist Mirjana Lučić-Baroni to reach the third round of the tournament.

=== 2022: Back to WTA 1000 level ===
After almost five years of absence at the WTA 1000 level, she qualified for the main draw at the Guadalajara Open where she lost in the first round to Eugenie Bouchard.

=== 2023: French Open third round, top 100 ===
Day won three matches in the French Open qualifying to make her first main draw at Roland Garros, as well as her first Grand Slam tournament appearance since the 2017 US Open. She defeated wildcard Kristina Mladenovic and 20th seed Madison Keys to reach the third round of a major for the first time. Day lost to Anna Karolína Schmiedlová in the third round.

She claimed the title at the Championnats de Granby, defeating Katherine Sebov in the final and moving to world No. 94 as a result.

=== 2024-2026: First WTA 1000-win ===
Day lost to Viktoriya Tomova in the first round of the 2024 Australian Open.

At the 2024 Indian Wells Open, she entered the main draw as a lucky loser replacing fourth seed and defending champion, Elena Rybakina, directly in the second round where she lost to Nadia Podoroska. She reached a career-high ranking of No. 84 on April 1, 2024.

Day lost to lucky loser Hailey Baptiste in the first round at the 2024 French Open.

In September 2025, she won her seventh professional title on her 26th birthday at the 2025 Central Coast Pro Tennis Open in Templeton, California.

Day qualified for the 2026 Indian Wells Open and defeated Francesca Jones, before losing to second seed Iga Świątek, in the second round.

In June 2026, Day qualified to make her main-draw debut at Wimbledon, meaning she had achieved the feat at all four major tournaments. She lost to 26th seed Madison Keys in the first round.

== Singles performance timeline ==
Key
| W | F | SF | QF | #R | RR | Q# | DNQ | A | NH |

(W) winner; (F) finalist; (SF) semifinalist; (QF) quarterfinalist; (#R) rounds 4, 3, 2, 1; (RR) round-robin stage; (Q#) qualification round; (DNQ) did not qualify; (A) absent; (NH) not held; (SR) strike rate (events won / competed); (W–L) win–loss record.
To avoid confusion and double counting, these charts are updated at the conclusion of a tournament or when the player's participation has ended.

Only main-draw results in WTA Tour, Grand Slam tournaments, Billie Jean King Cup, United Cup, Hopman Cup and Olympic Games are included in win–loss records.

Current through the 2024 Guadalajara Open.

| Tournament | 2016 | 2017 | 2018 | ... | 2022 | 2023 | 2024 | 2025 | SR | W–L | Win % |
|---|---|---|---|---|---|---|---|---|---|---|---|
Grand Slam tournaments
| Australian Open | A | 1R | Q3 | | A | Q2 | 1R | A | 0 / 2 | 0–2 | 0% |
| French Open | A | Q2 | Q1 | | A | 3R | 1R | A | 0 / 2 | 2–2 | 50% |
| Wimbledon | A | Q1 | A | | A | Q2 | Q2 | Q1 | 0 / 0 | 0–0 | – |
| US Open | 2R | 1R | Q1 | | Q2 | 1R | Q1 | Q1 | 0 / 3 | 1–3 | 25% |
| Win–loss | 1–1 | 0–2 | 0–0 | | 0–0 | 2–2 | 0–2 | 0–0 | 0 / 7 | 3–7 | 30% |
WTA 1000
| Qatar Open (Note: The first Premier 5 event of the year has switched back and forth between the Dubai Tennis Championships and the Qatar Ladies Open since 2009 until 2024. Dubai was classified as a Premier 5 event from 2009 to 2011 before being succeeded by Doha for the 2012–2014 period. In 2015, Dubai regained its Premier 5 status, while Doha was demoted to Premier status. The Premier 5 tournaments were reclassified as WTA 1000 tournaments in 2021.) | A | A | A | | A | A | A | A | 0 / 0 | 0–0 | – |
| Dubai | A | A | A | | A | A | A | A | 0 / 0 | 0–0 | – |
| Indian Wells Open | A | 3R | 1R | | A | A | 2R | A | 0 / 3 | 2–3 | 40% |
| Miami Open | A | Q1 | A | | A | A | Q1 | A | 0 / 0 | 0–0 | – |
| Madrid Open | A | A | A | | A | A | A | A | 0 / 0 | 0–0 | – |
| Italian Open | A | A | A | | A | A | A | A | 0 / 0 | 0–0 | – |
| Canadian Open | A | A | A | | A | 1R | Q2 | A | 0 / 1 | 0–1 | 0% |
| Cincinnati Open | A | Q1 | A | | A | A | A | A | 0 / 0 | 0–0 | – |
| Guadalajara Open | A | A | A | | 1R | A | 1R | A | 0 / 2 | 0–2 | 0% |
| Wuhan Open | A | A | A | | NH | | | | 0 / 0 | 0–0 | – |
| China Open | A | A | A | | NH | Q1 | A | A | 0 / 0 | 0–0 | – |
| Win–loss | 0–0 | 2–1 | 0–1 | | 0–1 | 0–1 | | | 0 / 4 | 2–4 | 33% |
Career statistics
| | 2016 | 2017 | 2018 | ... | 2022 | 2023 | | | SR | W–L | Win % |
| Tournaments | 2 | 5 | 2 | | 2 | 6 | | | Career total: 17 | | |
| Titles | 0 | 0 | 0 | | 0 | 0 | | | Career total: 0 | | |
| Finals | 0 | 0 | 0 | | 0 | 0 | | | Career total: 0 | | |
| Overall win–loss | 1–2 | 3–5 | 0–2 | | 0–2 | 3–6 | | | 0 / 17 | 7–17 | 29% |
| Year-end ranking (Note: 2015: WTA ranking–988, ... 2019: WTA ranking–440, 2020: WTA ranking–475, 2021: WTA ranking–375.) | 195 | 154 | 300 | | 195 | 87 | 245 | 261 | $860,655 | | |

== ITF Circuit finals ==
=== Singles: 20 (11 titles, 9 runner-ups) ===
Legend
W100 tournaments (2–0)
W80 tournaments (0–1)
W60/75 tournaments (2–2)
W50 tournaments (2–0)
W25/35 tournaments (5–5)
W15 tournaments (0–1)

| Result | W–L | Date | Tournament | Tier | Surface | Opponent | Score |
|---|---|---|---|---|---|---|---|
| Loss | 0–1 | May 2016 | ITF Naples, United States | 25,000 | Clay | (Russia) Valeria Solovyeva | 4–6, 0–6 |
| Win | 1–1 | Oct 2016 | Tennis Classic of Macon, United States | 50,000 | Hard | (United States) Danielle Collins | 6–1, 6–3 |
| Loss | 1–2 | Feb 2017 | Rancho Santa Fe Open, United States | 25,000 | Hard | (Canada) Bianca Andreescu | 4–6, 1–6 |
| Loss | 1–3 | Sep 2021 | ITF Fort Worth, United States | W25 | Hard | (Estonia) Kaia Kanepi | 2–6, 1–6 |
| Loss | 1–4 | Oct 2021 | ITF Austin, United States | W25 | Hard | (Sweden) Mirjam Björklund | 6–2, 2–6, 2–6 |
| Win | 2–4 | May 2022 | ITF Naples, United States | W25 | Clay | (Mexico) Ana Sofía Sánchez | 6–1, 6–1 |
| Loss | 2–5 | Jun 2022 | ITF Wichita, United States | W25 | Hard | (United States) Elizabeth Mandlik | 3–6, 3–6 |
| Win | 3–5 | Oct 2022 | ITF Redding, United States | W25 | Hard | (United States) Jamie Loeb | 6–3, 6–4 |
| Win | 4–5 | May 2023 | Bonita Springs Championship, United States | W100 | Clay | (United States) Ann Li | 6–2, 6–2 |
| Win | 5–5 | Jul 2023 | Championnats de Granby, Canada | W100 | Hard | (Canada) Katherine Sebov | 6–4, 2–6, 7–5 |
| Loss | 5–6 | Oct 2023 | Tyler Pro Challenge, United States | W80 | Hard | (United States) Emma Navarro | 3–6, 4–6 |
| Loss | 5–7 | Apr 2024 | Charlottesville Open, United States | W75 | Clay | (United States) Louisa Chirico | 1–6, 5–7 |
| Loss | 5–8 | Jul 2025 | ITF San Diego, United States | W15 | Hard | (United States) Tianmei Wang | 4–6, 3–6 |
| Win | 6–8 | Aug 2025 | ITF Southaven, United States | W25 | Hard | (Mexico) Ana Sofía Sánchez | 6–4, 6–1 |
| Win | 7–8 | Sep 2025 | Templeton Open, United States | W75 | Hard | (Canada) Kayla Cross | 6–2, 3–0 ret. |
| Win | 8–8 | Jan 2026 | ITF Le Lamentin (Martinique), France | W35 | Hard | (France) Jenny Lim | 6–4, 6–2 |
| Win | 9–8 | Feb 2026 | ITF Orlando, United States | W50 | Hard | (United States) Katrina Scott | 6–4, 6–2 |
| Win | 10–8 | Apr 2026 | ITF Boca Raton, United States | W35 | Clay | (United States) Mary Stoiana | 6–3, 6–1 |
| Loss | 10–9 | May 2026 | Zaragoza Open, Spain | W75 | Clay | (Italy) Jennifer Ruggeri | 6–3, 3–6, 6–7^{(3)} |
| Win | 11–9 | Sep 2026 | Berkeley Tennis Club Challenge, United States | W50 | Hard | (United States) Janae Preston | 7–5, 6–4 |

=== Doubles: 6 (4 titles, 2 runner-ups) ===
Legend
W100 tournaments
W75 tournaments
W25/35 tournaments

| Result | W–L | Date | Tournament | Tier | Surface | Partner | Opponents | Score |
|---|---|---|---|---|---|---|---|---|
| Loss | 0–1 | Feb 2017 | Midland Tennis Classic, United States | 100,000 | Hard (i) | (United States) Caroline Dolehide | (United States) Ashley Weinhold (United States) Caitlin Whoriskey | 6–7^{(1)}, 3–6 |
| Win | 1–1 | Feb 2017 | Rancho Santa Fe Open, United States | 25,000 | Hard | (United States) Caroline Dolehide | (Ukraine) Anhelina Kalinina (United States) Chiara Scholl | 6–3, 1–6, [10–7] |
| Win | 2–1 | Feb 2019 | Rancho Santa Fe Open, United States | W25 | Hard | (United States) Sophia Whittle | (Hong Kong) Eudice Chong (China) You Xiaodi | 6–2, 5–7, [10–7] |
| Win | 3–1 | Oct 2024 | Edmond Open, United States | W75 | Hard | (Australia) Jaimee Fourlis | (United States) Sophie Chang (United States) Rasheeda McAdoo | 7–5, 7–5 |
| Loss | 3–2 | May 2025 | ITF Boca Raton, United States | W35 | Clay | (United States) Allura Zamarripa | (United States) Fiona Crawley (United States) Alana Smith | 4–6, 2–6 |
| Win | 4–2 | Jan 2026 | ITF Le Lamentin (Martinique), France | W35 | Hard | (United States) Jenna Dean | (France) Jenny Lim (France) Margaux Rouvroy | 6–4, 1–6, [10–7] |

== Junior Grand Slam tournament finals ==
=== Girls' singles: 1 (title) ===
| Result | Year | Tournament | Surface | Opponent | Score |
|---|---|---|---|---|---|
| Win | 2016 | US Open | Hard | (Slovakia) Viktória Kužmová | 6–3, 6–2 |

=== Girls' doubles: 1 (runner-up) ===
| Result | Year | Tournament | Surface | Partner | Opponents | Score |
|---|---|---|---|---|---|---|
| Loss | 2016 | US Open | Hard | (United States) Caroline Dolehide | (United States) Jada Hart (United States) Ena Shibahara | 6–4, 2–6, [11–13] |
