= 2021 Mercer Tennis Classic – Singles =

Singles
- 2021 Mercer Tennis Classic

Final
- Champion: (United States) Madison Brengle
- Runner-up: (Kazakhstan) Zarina Diyas
- Score: 6–4, 4–6, 6–4

Events
Singles	Doubles
← 2020 ·	Tennis Classic of Macon	· 2022 →

Catherine Bellis was the defending champion but chose not to participate.

Madison Brengle won the title, defeating Zarina Diyas in the final, 6–4, 4–6, 6–4.

== Seeds ==
1. (United States) Madison Brengle (champion)
2. (Kazakhstan) Zarina Diyas (final)
3. (Slovakia) Kristína Kučová (first round, retired)
4. (Brazil) Beatriz Haddad Maia (semifinals)
5. (Mexico) Renata Zarazúa (quarterfinals, retired)
6. (Australia) Maddison Inglis (first round)
7. (China) Wang Xiyu (semifinals)
8. (Canada) Rebecca Marino (first round)

== Draw ==
=== Key ===
- Q = Qualifier
- WC = Wild card
- LL = Lucky loser
- Alt = Alternate
- SE = Special exempt
- PR = Protected ranking
- ITF = ITF entry
- JE = Junior exempt
- w/o = Walkover
- r = Retired
- d = Defaulted
- SR = Special ranking

=== Finals ===
Semifinals
1	(United States) Madison Brengle	6	6
7	(China) Wang Xiyu	3	4
4	(Brazil) Beatriz Haddad Maia	4	1
2	(Kazakhstan) Zarina Diyas	6	6

Final
1	(United States) Madison Brengle	6	4	6
2	(Kazakhstan) Zarina Diyas	4	6	4

=== Top half ===
First round
1	(United States) M Brengle	6	6^{1}	6
(France) T Andrianjafitrimo	4	7^{7}	4
(United States) G Min	6	3	3
(China) Jia Lu	1	6	6
WC	(United States) E Navarro	6	6
WC	(United States) H Baptiste	2	4
Q	(United States) L Chirico	6	6
6	(Australia) M Inglis	3	2
3	(Slovakia) K Kučová	4	0^{r}
WC	(United States) C Harrison	6	0
(Japan) K Nara	6^{2}	4
(United States) C Dolehide	7^{7}	6
(Australia) L Cabrera	7	6
WC	(United States) UM Arconada	5	2
Q	(United States) A Kiick	0	0
7	(China) Xiy Wang	6	6

Second round
1	(United States) M Brengle	7	1	6
(China) Jia Lu	5	6	2
WC	(United States) E Navarro	4	6	4
Q	(United States) L Chirico	6	2	6
WC	(United States) C Harrison	7	6
(United States) C Dolehide	5	1
(Australia) L Cabrera	0	2
7	(China) Xiy Wang	6	6

Quarterfinals
1	(United States) M Brengle	7^{7}	6
Q	(United States) L Chirico	6^{5}	4
WC	(United States) C Harrison	4	6	6^{5}
7	(China) Xiy Wang	6	3	7^{7}

Semifinals
1	(United States) M Brengle	6	6
7	(China) Xiy Wang	3	4

=== Bottom half ===
First round
5	(Mexico) R Zarazúa	6	6
(Germany) T Maria	2	0
Q	(United States) A Smith	6	5	6
Q	(United States) W Osuigwe	0	7	4
(Poland) K Kawa	5	4
Q	(United States) R Anderson	7	6
(Switzerland) L Küng	0	4
4	(Brazil) B Haddad Maia	6	6
8	(Canada) R Marino	3	6	2
(United States) K Volynets	6	2	6
Q	(United States) V Duval	4	6	6
Q	(United States) D Lao	6	0	0
(United States) A Muhammad	2	2
Q	(United States) H Chang	6	6
PR	(Australia) P Hon	3	6	2
2	(Kazakhstan) Z Diyas	6	1	6

Second round
5	(Mexico) R Zarazúa	6	6
Q	(United States) A Smith	4	3
Q	(United States) R Anderson	4	3
4	(Brazil) B Haddad Maia	6	6
(United States) K Volynets	5	4
Q	(United States) V Duval	7	6
Q	(United States) H Chang	4	5
2	(Kazakhstan) Z Diyas	6	7

Quarterfinals
5	(Mexico) R Zarazúa	0^{r}
4	(Brazil) B Haddad Maia	3
Q	(United States) V Duval	1	4
2	(Kazakhstan) Z Diyas	6	6

Semifinals
4	(Brazil) B Haddad Maia	4	1
2	(Kazakhstan) Z Diyas	6	6
