= 2013 Tevlin Women's Challenger =

- Date: October 28 – November 3
- Edition: 9th
- Category: ITF Women's Circuit
- Prize money: US$50,000
- Surface: Hard – indoors
- Location: Toronto, Ontario, Canada
- Venue: Rexall Centre

Champions

Singles
- (United States) Victoria Duval

Doubles
- (Canada) Françoise Abanda / (United States) Victoria Duval
← 2012 ·	Tevlin Women's Challenger	· 2014 →

The 2013 Tevlin Women's Challenger was a professional tennis tournament played on indoor hard courts. It was the 9th edition of the tournament and part of the 2013 ITF Women's Circuit, offering a total of $50,000 in prize money. It took place in Toronto, Ontario, Canada between October 28 and November 3, 2013.

== Singles main-draw entrants ==
=== Seeds ===
Country	Player	Rank^{1}	Seed
HUN	Tímea Babos	98	1
LUX	Mandy Minella	111	2
USA	Melanie Oudin	121	3
CZE	Andrea Hlaváčková	142	4
FRA	Alizé Lim	160	5
TUN	Ons Jabeur	166	6
USA	Victoria Duval	197	7
USA	Jessica Pegula	201	8

- ^{1} Rankings are as of October 21, 2013

=== Other entrants ===
The following players received wildcards into the singles main draw:

- (Canada) Françoise Abanda
- (Canada) Élisabeth Fournier
- (Canada) Marie-Alexandre Leduc
- (Canada) Gloria Liang

The following players received entry from the qualifying draw:

- (United States) Macall Harkins
- (Canada) Petra Januskova
- (United States) Tori Kinard
- (Canada) Jillian O'Neill

The following players received entry as lucky losers:

- (United States) Lena Litvak
- (Canada) Sonja Molnar

== Champions ==
=== Singles ===
- (United States) Victoria Duval def. (Hungary) Tímea Babos, 7–5, retired

=== Doubles ===
- (Canada) Françoise Abanda / (United States) Victoria Duval def. (United States) Melanie Oudin / (United States) Jessica Pegula, 7–6^{(7–5)}, 2–6, [11–9]
