= 2021 Mercer Tennis Classic – Doubles =

Doubles
- 2021 Mercer Tennis Classic

Final
- Champions: (United States) Quinn Gleason (United States) Catherine Harrison
- Runners-up: (United States) Alycia Parks (United States) Alana Smith
- Score: 6–2, 6–2

Events
Singles	Doubles
← 2020 ·	Tennis Classic of Macon	· 2022 →

Katarzyna Kawa and Magdalena Fręch were the defending champions but Fręch chose not to participate. Kawa partnered alongside Tereza Mihalíková, but they lost in the first round to Emily Appleton and Fernanda Contreras.

Quinn Gleason and Catherine Harrison won the title, defeating Alycia Parks and Alana Smith in the final, 6–2, 6–2.

== Seeds ==
1. (Poland) Katarzyna Kawa / (Slovakia) Tereza Mihalíková (first round)
2. (United States) Quinn Gleason / (United States) Catherine Harrison (champions)
3. (Switzerland) Conny Perrin / (Mexico) Renata Zarazúa (semifinals)
4. (United States) Hailey Baptiste / (United States) Whitney Osuigwe (quarterfinals)

== Draw ==
=== Key ===
- Q = Qualifier
- WC = Wild card
- LL = Lucky loser
- Alt = Alternate
- SE = Special exempt
- PR = Protected ranking
- ITF = ITF entry
- JE = Junior exempt
- w/o = Walkover
- r = Retired
- d = Defaulted
- SR = Special ranking

=== Draw ===
First round
1	(Poland) K Kawa (Slovakia) T Mihalíková	2	2
(United Kingdom) E Appleton (Mexico) F Contreras	6	6
(United States) A Parks (United States) A Smith	2	6	[10]
(Colombia) E Arango (United States) M Brengle	6	3	[2]
4	(United States) H Baptiste (United States) W Osuigwe	6	6
(South Korea) J-h Choi (South Korea) N-l Han	3	3
(Australia) A Myers (Australia) I Popovic	w/o
(Bulgaria) E Tchakarova (Bulgaria) V Tchakarova
(China) Jia Lu (China) Xiy Wang	6	6
WC	(United States) M Courville (Spain) A García Fernández	1	0
(United States) R Anderson (United States) V Duval	6	3	[2]
3	(Switzerland) C Perrin (Mexico) R Zarazúa	3	6	[10]
(United States) H Chang (United States) E Mandlik	6	4	[15]
(Japan) N Hanatani (Japan) M Uchijima	0	6	[17]
(Australia) L Cabrera (Australia) P Hon	2	6^{3}
2	(United States) Q Gleason (United States) C Harrison	6	7^{7}

Quarterfinals
(United Kingdom) E Appleton (Mexico) F Contreras	2	6	[8]
(United States) A Parks (United States) A Smith	6	2	[10]
4	(United States) H Baptiste (United States) W Osuigwe	2	3
(Australia) A Myers (Australia) I Popovic	6	6
(China) Jia Lu (China) Xiy Wang	3	6	[7]
3	(Switzerland) C Perrin (Mexico) R Zarazúa	6	3	[10]
(Japan) N Hanatani (Japan) M Uchijima	6^{2}	4
2	(United States) Q Gleason (United States) C Harrison	7^{7}	6

Semifinals
(United States) A Parks (United States) A Smith	3	7	[10]
(Australia) A Myers (Australia) I Popovic	6	5	[4]
3	(Switzerland) C Perrin (Mexico) R Zarazúa	4	5
2	(United States) Q Gleason (United States) C Harrison	6	7

Final
(United States) A Parks (United States) A Smith	2	2
2	(United States) Q Gleason (United States) C Harrison	6	6
