= 2021 Mercer Tennis Classic =

Tennis tournament

- Date: 18–24 October 2021
- Edition: 9th
- Category: ITF Women's World Tennis Tour
- Prize money: $80,000
- Surface: Hard
- Location: Macon, Georgia, United States

Champions

Singles
- (United States) Madison Brengle

Doubles
- (United States) Quinn Gleason / (United States) Catherine Harrison
← 2020 ·	Tennis Classic of Macon	· 2022 →

The 2021 Mercer Tennis Classic was a professional women's tennis tournament played on outdoor hard courts. It was the ninth edition of the tournament which was part of the 2021 ITF Women's World Tennis Tour. It took place in Macon, Georgia, United States between 18 and 24 October 2021.

== Singles main-draw entrants ==
=== Seeds ===
Country	Player	Rank^{1}	Seed
USA	Madison Brengle	88	1
KAZ	Zarina Diyas	108	2
SVK	Kristína Kučová	112	3
BRA	Beatriz Haddad Maia	115	4
MEX	Renata Zarazúa	118	5
AUS	Maddison Inglis	127	6
CHN	Wang Xiyu	137	7
CAN	Rebecca Marino	157	8

- ^{1} Rankings are as of 4 October 2021.

=== Other entrants ===
The following players received wildcards into the singles main draw:

- (United States) Usue Maitane Arconada
- (United States) Hailey Baptiste
- (United States) Catherine Harrison
- (United States) Emma Navarro

The following player received entry using a protected ranking:

- (Australia) Priscilla Hon

The following players received entry from the qualifying draw:

- (United States) Robin Anderson
- (United States) Hanna Chang
- (United States) Louisa Chirico
- (United States) Victoria Duval
- (United States) Allie Kiick
- (United States) Danielle Lao
- (United States) Whitney Osuigwe
- (United States) Alana Smith

== Champions ==
=== Singles ===
- (United States) Madison Brengle def. (Kazakhstan) Zarina Diyas, 6–4, 4–6, 6–4

=== Doubles ===
- (United States) Quinn Gleason / (United States) Catherine Harrison def. (United States) Alycia Parks / (United States) Alana Smith, 6–2, 6–2
