= 2013 Tevlin Women's Challenger – Doubles =

Doubles
- 2013 Tevlin Women's Challenger

Final
- Champions: (Canada) Françoise Abanda (United States) Victoria Duval
- Runners-up: (United States) Melanie Oudin (United States) Jessica Pegula
- Score: 7–6^{(7–5)}, 2–6, [11–9]

Events
Singles	Doubles
- Tevlin Women's Challenger

Gabriela Dabrowski and Alla Kudryavtseva were the defending champions, having won the event in 2012. Kudryavtseva decided not to participate and Dabrowski partnered with Allie Will but lost in the quarterfinals.

Françoise Abanda and Victoria Duval won the title, defeating Melanie Oudin and Jessica Pegula in the final, 7–6^{(7–5)}, 2–6, [11–9].

== Seeds ==
1. (Canada) Gabriela Dabrowski / (United States) Allie Will (quarterfinals)
2. (United States) Melanie Oudin / (United States) Jessica Pegula (final)
3. (United States) Macall Harkins / (United States) Emily Harman (semifinals)
4. (United States) Chieh-Yu Hsu / (United States) Lena Litvak (first round)

== Draw ==
Key

- Q = Qualifier
- WC = Wild card
- LL = Lucky loser
- Alt = Alternate
- ITF = ITF entry
- PR = Protected ranking
- SR = Special ranking
- SE = Special exempt
- JE = Junior exempt
- JR = Junior Accelerator Programme entrant
- CO = College Accelerator Programme entrant
- NG = Next Gen Accelerator Program entrant
- w/o = Walkover
- r = Retired
- d = Defaulted

First round
1	(Canada) G Dabrowski (United States) A Will	6	6
(Portugal) B Luz (United States) D Mills	0	1
(Canada) F Abanda (United States) V Duval	6	6
(United States) R Ellison (United States) S Ellison	1	3
4	(United States) C-Y Hsu (United States) L Litvak	6	5	[8]
(Netherlands) I de Vroome (Canada) S Molnar	0	7	[10]
(Canada) É Fournier (Canada) P Januskova	6	7^{7}
(Canada) M-A Leduc (Canada) G Liang	2	6^{1}
WC	(Canada) V Dimuzio (Canada) G Mboko	2	4
WC	(Canada) C Robillard-Millette (Canada) V Wong	6	6
(United States) A Mueller (Canada) J O'Neill	7^{7}	5	[6]
3	(United States) M Harkins (United States) E Harman	6^{3}	7	[10]
(Canada) C Petrick (Canada) K Sebov	4	2
WC	(Canada) A Broomfield (Canada) M Patrascu	6	6
(United States) M Kobelt (Mexico) V Salazar	6^{1}	1
2	(United States) M Oudin (United States) J Pegula	7^{7}	6

Quarterfinals
1	(Canada) G Dabrowski (United States) A Will	6	2	[5]
(Canada) F Abanda (United States) V Duval	3	6	[10]
(Netherlands) I de Vroome (Canada) S Molnar	6	6
(Canada) É Fournier (Canada) P Januskova	2	0
WC	(Canada) C Robillard-Millette (Canada) V Wong	1	2
3	(United States) M Harkins (United States) E Harman	6	6
WC	(Canada) A Broomfield (Canada) M Patrascu	4	3
2	(United States) M Oudin (United States) J Pegula	6	6

Semifinals
(Canada) F Abanda (United States) V Duval	6	6
(Netherlands) I de Vroome (Canada) S Molnar	4	3
3	(United States) M Harkins (United States) E Harman	4	3
2	(United States) M Oudin (United States) J Pegula	6	6

Final
(Canada) F Abanda (United States) V Duval	7^{7}	2	[11]
2	(United States) M Oudin (United States) J Pegula	6^{5}	6	[9]
