= 2017 Tennis Classic of Macon =

- Date: 23–29 October
- Edition: 5th
- Category: ITF Women's Circuit
- Prize money: $80,000
- Surface: Hard
- Location: Macon, United States

Champions

Singles
- (Slovakia) Anna Karolína Schmiedlová

Doubles
- (United States) Kaitlyn Christian / (United States) Sabrina Santamaria
← 2016 ·	Tennis Classic of Macon	· 2018 →

The 2017 Tennis Classic of Macon was a professional tennis tournament played on outdoor hard courts. It was the fifth edition of the tournament and was part of the 2017 ITF Women's Circuit. It took place in Macon, United States, on 23–29 October 2017.

== Singles main draw entrants ==
=== Seeds ===
Country	Player	Rank^{1}	Seed
ITA	Francesca Schiavone	84	1
UKR	Kateryna Bondarenko	92	2
USA	Nicole Gibbs	105	3
USA	Sachia Vickery	113	4
USA	Sofia Kenin	114	5
USA	Kristie Ahn	115	6
USA	Taylor Townsend	126	7
USA	Kayla Day	135	8

- ^{1} Rankings as of 16 October 2017.

=== Other entrants ===
The following players received a wildcard into the singles main draw:

- (Ukraine) Alona Bondarenko
- (United States) Victoria Duval
- (United States) Nicole Gibbs
- (United States) Katerina Stewart

The following players received entry from the qualifying draw:

- (Norway) Ulrikke Eikeri
- (United States) Ashley Kratzer
- (United States) Ann Li
- (United States) Ashley Weinhold

== Champions ==
=== Singles ===
- (Slovakia) Anna Karolína Schmiedlová def. (United States) Victoria Duval, 6–4, 6–1

=== Doubles ===
- (United States) Kaitlyn Christian / (United States) Sabrina Santamaria def. (Brazil) Paula Cristina Gonçalves / (United States) Sanaz Marand, 6–1, 6–0
