= 2014 Dothan Pro Tennis Classic =

Professional tennis tournament in Alabama, US

- Date: April 14–20
- Edition: 14th
- Category: ITF Women's Circuit
- Prize money: $50,000
- Surface: Clay
- Location: Dothan, Alabama, United States

Champions

Singles
- (United States) Grace Min

Doubles
- (Estonia) Anett Kontaveit / (Belarus) Ilona Kremen
- Dothan Pro Tennis Classic

The 2014 Dothan Pro Tennis Classic was a professional tennis tournament played on outdoor clay courts. It was the fourteenth edition of the tournament and part of the 2014 ITF Women's Circuit, offering a total of $50,000 in prize money. It took place in Dothan, Alabama, United States, on April 14–20, 2014.

== Singles main draw entrants ==
=== Seeds ===
Country	Player	Rank^{1}	Seed
BLR	Olga Govortsova	105	1
USA	Shelby Rogers	110	2
POR	Michelle Larcher de Brito	125	3
AUS	Olivia Rogowska	130	4
USA	Melanie Oudin	135	5
USA	Irina Falconi	136	6
PAR	Verónica Cepede Royg	139	7
USA	Victoria Duval	148	8

- ^{1} Rankings as of April 7, 2014

=== Other entrants ===
The following players received wildcards into the singles main draw:

- (United States) Louisa Chirico
- (Belarus) Olga Govortsova
- (United States) Melanie Oudin
- (United States) Taylor Townsend

The following players received entry from the qualifying draw:

- (Norway) Ulrikke Eikeri
- (Ukraine) Anhelina Kalinina
- (United States) Danielle Lao
- (United States) Peggy Porter

== Champions ==
=== Singles ===
- (United States) Grace Min def. (United States) Victoria Duval 6–3, 6–1

=== Doubles ===
- (Estonia) Anett Kontaveit / (Belarus) Ilona Kremen def. (United States) Shelby Rogers / (Australia) Olivia Rogowska 6–1, 5–7, [10–5]

== See also ==
- Dothan Pro Tennis Classic
- 2014 ITF Women's Circuit
- 2014 Dothan Pro Tennis Classic – Singles
- 2014 Dothan Pro Tennis Classic – Doubles
- ITF Women's Circuit
