= 2018 Mercer Tennis Classic =

- Date: 22–28 October
- Edition: 6th
- Category: ITF Women's Circuit
- Prize money: $80,000
- Surface: Hard
- Location: Macon, United States

Champions

Singles
- (United States) Varvara Lepchenko

Doubles
- (United States) Caty McNally / (United States) Jessica Pegula
← 2017 ·	Tennis Classic of Macon	· 2019 →

The 2018 Mercer Tennis Classic was a professional tennis tournament played on outdoor hard courts. It was the sixth edition of the tournament and was part of the 2018 ITF Women's Circuit. It took place in Macon, United States, on 22–28 October 2018.

== Singles main draw entrants ==
=== Seeds ===
Country	Player	Rank^{1}	Seed
USA	Madison Brengle	88	1
USA	Jessica Pegula	129	2
RUS	Sofya Zhuk	134	3
USA	Claire Liu	140	4
USA	Nicole Gibbs	145	5
USA	Kristie Ahn	147	6
CZE	Marie Bouzková	151	7
USA	Christina McHale	154	8

- ^{1} Rankings as of 15 October 2018.

=== Other entrants ===
The following players received a wildcard into the singles main draw:

- (United States) Christina McHale
- (Chile) Alexa Guarachi

The following players received entry from the qualifying draw:

- (United States) Hailey Baptiste
- (United States) Louisa Chirico
- (United States) Sanaz Marand
- (Mexico) Giuliana Olmos

== Champions ==
=== Singles ===
- (United States) Varvara Lepchenko def. (Paraguay) Verónica Cepede Royg, 6–4, 6–4

=== Doubles ===
- (United States) Caty McNally / (United States) Jessica Pegula def. (Kazakhstan) Anna Danilina / (United States) Ingrid Neel, 6–1, 5–7, [11–9]
