= 2020 Mercer Tennis Classic – Singles =

Singles
- 2020 Mercer Tennis Classic

Final
- Champion: (United States) Catherine Bellis
- Runner-up: (Ukraine) Marta Kostyuk
- Score: 6–4, 6–7^{(4–7)}, 0–0 ret.

Events
| Singles | Doubles |
| ← 2019 · | Mercer Tennis Classic | · 2021 → |

Katerina Stewart was the defending champion, but lost in the first round to Ann Li.

Catherine Bellis won the title, defeating Marta Kostyuk in final after she retired at 6–4, 6–7^{(4–7)}, 0–0.

== Seeds ==
1. (Japan) Misaki Doi (quarterfinals)
2. (Serbia) Nina Stojanović (first round)
3. (Puerto Rico) Monica Puig (withdrew)
4. (United States) Kristie Ahn (second round)
5. (United States) Ann Li (second round)
6. (Ukraine) Marta Kostyuk (final)
7. (Belgium) Greet Minnen (first round)
8. (United States) Caty McNally (second round)
9. (Australia) Astra Sharma (first round)

== Draw ==
=== Key ===
- Q = Qualifier
- WC = Wild card
- LL = Lucky loser
- Alt = Alternate
- SE = Special exempt
- PR = Protected ranking
- ITF = ITF entry
- JE = Junior exempt
- w/o = Walkover
- r = Retired
- d = Defaulted
- SR = Special ranking

=== Finals ===
Semifinals
6 | (Ukraine) Marta Kostyuk | 6 | 6
Q | (Poland) Magdalena Fręch | 3 | 2
WC | (United States) Catherine Bellis | 6 | 1
Q | (United States) Varvara Lepchenko | 3 | 0^{r}

Final
6 | (Ukraine) Marta Kostyuk | 4 | 7^{7} | 0^{r}
WC | (United States) Catherine Bellis | 6 | 6^{4} | 0

=== Top half ===
First round
1 | (Japan) M Doi | 6 | 6
WC | (Switzerland) L Sun | 2 | 0
(Belarus) O Govortsova | 4 | 1
Q | (Paraguay) V Cepede Royg | 6 | 6
Q | (Mexico) R Zarazúa | 6 | 3
(United States) UM Arconada | 2 | 0^{r}
LL | (Belgium) M Benoît | 3 | 2
6 | (Ukraine) M Kostyuk | 6 | 6
9 | (Australia) A Sharma | 3 | 4
(United States) F Di Lorenzo | 6 | 6
(United States) W Osuigwe | 3 | 6 | 0
Q | (Colombia) C Osorio | 6 | 4 | 6
Q | (Poland) M Fręch | 6 | 5
(Bulgaria) V Tomova | 2 | 2^{r}
WC | (United States) E Navarro | 2 | 4
8 | (United States) C McNally | 6 | 6

Second round
1 | (Japan) M Doi | 6^{5} | 7^{7} | 6
Q | (Paraguay) V Cepede Royg | 7^{7} | 6^{3} | 1
Q | (Mexico) R Zarazúa | 0 | 4
6 | (Ukraine) M Kostyuk | 6 | 6
(United States) F Di Lorenzo | 6 | 6
Q | (Colombia) C Osorio | 2 | 2
Q | (Poland) M Fręch | 7^{7} | 6
8 | (United States) C McNally | 6^{5} | 3

Quarterfinals
1 | (Japan) M Doi | 2 | 1
6 | (Ukraine) M Kostyuk | 6 | 6
(United States) F Di Lorenzo | 5 | 3
Q | (Poland) M Fręch | 7 | 6

Semifinals
6 | (Ukraine) M Kostyuk | 6 | 6
Q | (Poland) M Fręch | 3 | 2

=== Bottom half ===
First round
7 | (Belgium) G Minnen | 6 | 3 | 1
Q | (Romania) G Talabă | 1 | 6 | 6
WC | (United States) C Bellis | 6 | 7
(Spain) L Arruabarrena | 3 | 5
(Italy) S Errani | 6 | 6
(Poland) K Kawa | 3 | 0
Q | (France) T Andrianjafitrimo | 3 | 3
4 | (United States) K Ahn | 6 | 6
5 | (United States) A Li | 6 | 6
WC | (United States) K Stewart | 1 | 4
(United States) S Vickery | 6 | 6
JE | (France) D Parry | 3 | 1
(United States) C Dolehide | 6^{3} | 3
Q | (United States) K Volynets | 7^{7} | 6
Q | (United States) V Lepchenko | 6^{5} | 6 | 7^{8}
2 | (Serbia) N Stojanović | 7^{7} | 2 | 6^{6}

Second round
(Romania) G Talabă | 1 | 3
WC | (United States) C Bellis | 6 | 6
(Italy) S Errani | 6 | 6
4 | (United States) K Ahn | 3 | 4
5 | (United States) A Li | 4 | 3
(United States) S Vickery | 6 | 6
Q | (United States) K Volynets | 0 | 1
Q | (United States) V Lepchenko | 6 | 6

Quarterfinals
WC | (United States) C Bellis | 6 | 6
(Italy) S Errani | 0 | 3
(United States) S Vickery | 7^{7} | 4 | 4
Q | (United States) V Lepchenko | 6^{5} | 6 | 6

Semifinals
WC | (United States) C Bellis | 6 | 1
Q | (United States) V Lepchenko | 3 | 0^{r}
