= 2020 Mercer Tennis Classic =

Tennis tournament

- Date: 19–25 October 2020
- Edition: 8th
- Category: ITF Women's World Tennis Tour
- Prize money: $80,000
- Surface: Hard
- Location: Macon, Georgia, United States

Champions

Singles
- (United States) Catherine Bellis

Doubles
- (Poland) Magdalena Fręch / (Poland) Katarzyna Kawa
← 2019 ·	Tennis Classic of Macon	· 2021 →

The 2020 Mercer Tennis Classic was a professional tennis tournament played on outdoor hard courts. It was the eighth edition of the tournament which was part of the 2020 ITF Women's World Tennis Tour. It took place in Macon, Georgia, United States between 19 and 25 October 2020.

== Singles main-draw entrants ==
=== Seeds ===
Country	Player	Rank^{1}	Seed
JPN	Misaki Doi	86	1
SRB	Nina Stojanović	98	2
~~PUR~~	~~Monica Puig~~	~~103~~	~~3~~
USA	Kristie Ahn	105	4
USA	Ann Li	112	5
UKR	Marta Kostyuk	113	6
BEL	Greet Minnen	115	7
USA	Caty McNally	119	8
AUS	Astra Sharma	127	9

- ^{1} Rankings are as of 12 October 2020.

=== Other entrants ===
The following players received wildcards into the singles main draw:

- (United States) Catherine Bellis
- (United States) Emma Navarro
- (United States) Katerina Stewart
- (Switzerland) Lulu Sun

The following player received entry as a junior exempt:

- (France) Diane Parry

The following players received entry from the qualifying draw:

- (France) Tessah Andrianjafitrimo
- (Paraguay) Verónica Cepede Royg
- (Poland) Magdalena Fręch
- (United States) Varvara Lepchenko
- (Colombia) Camila Osorio
- (Romania) Gabriela Talabă
- (United States) Katie Volynets
- (Mexico) Renata Zarazúa

The following player received entry as a lucky loser:

- (Belgium) Marie Benoît

== Champions ==
=== Singles ===
- (United States) Catherine Bellis def. (Ukraine) Marta Kostyuk, 6–4, 6–7^{(4–7)}, 0–0, ret.

=== Doubles ===
- (Poland) Magdalena Fręch / (Poland) Katarzyna Kawa def. (United States) Francesca Di Lorenzo / (United States) Jamie Loeb, 7–5, 6–1
