= 2017 Tennis Classic of Macon – Doubles =

Doubles
- 2017 Tennis Classic of Macon

Final
- Champion: (United States) Kaitlyn Christian (United States) Sabrina Santamaria
- Runner-up: (Brazil) Paula Cristina Gonçalves (United States) Sanaz Marand
- Score: 6–1, 6–0

Events
Singles	Doubles
← 2016 ·	Tennis Classic of Macon	· 2018 →

Michaëlla Krajicek and Taylor Townsend were the defending champions, but Krajicek chose not to participate. Townsend plays alongside Jessica Pegula, but they withdrew before their quarterfinal match.

Kaitlyn Christian and Sabrina Santamaria won the title after defeating Paula Cristina Gonçalves and Sanaz Marand 6–1, 6–0 in the final.

== Seeds ==
1. (United States) Ashley Weinhold / (United States) Caitlin Whoriskey (first round)
2. (United States) Sophie Chang / (United States) Alexandra Mueller (semifinals)
3. (United States) Sofia Kenin / (Russia) Anastasiya Komardina (semifinals)
4. (United States) Kaitlyn Christian / (United States) Sabrina Santamaria (champions)

== Draw ==
=== Key ===
- Q = Qualifier
- WC = Wild card
- LL = Lucky loser
- Alt = Alternate
- SE = Special exempt
- PR = Protected ranking
- ITF = ITF entry
- JE = Junior exempt
- w/o = Walkover
- r = Retired
- d = Defaulted
- SR = Special ranking

First round
1	(United States) A Weinhold (United States) C Whoriskey	3	6	[7]
(United States) J Pegula (United States) T Townsend	6	3	[10]
WC	(United States) B Boren (United States) L Guillermo	1	3
(Brazil) PC Gonçalves (United States) S Marand	6	6
3	(United States) S Kenin (Russia) A Komardina	6	6
WC	(United States) W Kay (United States) J Loeb	1	4
(Ukraine) A Bondarenko (Ukraine) K Bondarenko	6	4	[10]
(Russia) A Gabueva (Slovakia) AK Schmiedlová	4	6	[4]
(United States) J Boserup (New Zealand) M Erakovic	5	0^{r}
(Turkey) Ç Büyükakçay (Sweden) R Peterson	7	0
(United States) M Kobelt (South Africa) C Simmonds	3	1
4	(United States) K Christian (United States) S Santamaria	6	6
(Norway) U Eikeri (Bulgaria) E Kostova	6	6
WC	(United States) K Derienzo (United States) R McAdoo	2	2
(United States) K Day (United States) A Kratzer	6^{10}	6	[7]
2	(United States) S Chang (United States) A Mueller	7^{12}	2	[10]

Quarterfinals
(United States) J Pegula (United States) T Townsend
(Brazil) PC Gonçalves (United States) S Marand	w/o
3	(United States) S Kenin (Russia) A Komardina	7^{7}	6
(Ukraine) A Bondarenko (Ukraine) K Bondarenko	6^{5}	2
(Turkey) Ç Büyükakçay (Sweden) R Peterson	4	6	[5]
4	(United States) K Christian (United States) S Santamaria	6	4	[10]
(Norway) U Eikeri (Bulgaria) E Kostova	3	6^{7}
2	(United States) S Chang (United States) A Mueller	6	7^{9}

Semifinals
(Brazil) PC Gonçalves (United States) S Marand	7	6
3	(United States) S Kenin (Russia) A Komardina	5	4
4	(United States) K Christian (United States) S Santamaria	6	6
2	(United States) S Chang (United States) A Mueller	3	2

Final
(Brazil) PC Gonçalves (United States) S Marand	1	0
4	(United States) K Christian (United States) S Santamaria	6	6
