= 2013 Tevlin Women's Challenger – Singles =

Singles
- 2013 Tevlin Women's Challenger

Final
- Champion: (United States) Victoria Duval
- Runner-up: (Hungary) Tímea Babos
- Score: 7–5, ret.

Events
Singles	Doubles
← 2012 ·	Tevlin Women's Challenger	· 2014 →

Eugenie Bouchard was the defending champion, having won the event in 2012, but decided not to participate in 2013.

Victoria Duval won the tournament when Tímea Babos retired having lost the first set 7–5.

== Seeds ==
1. (Hungary) Tímea Babos (final; retired)
2. (Luxembourg) Mandy Minella (quarterfinals)
3. (United States) Melanie Oudin (semifinals)
4. (Czech Republic) Andrea Hlaváčková (semifinals)
5. (France) Alizé Lim (quarterfinals)
6. (Tunisia) Ons Jabeur (quarterfinals)
7. (United States) Victoria Duval (champion)
8. (United States) Jessica Pegula (quarterfinals)

== Main draw ==
=== Key ===
- Q = Qualifier
- WC = Wild card
- LL = Lucky loser
- Alt = Alternate
- SE = Special exempt
- PR = Protected ranking
- ITF = ITF entry
- JE = Junior exempt
- w/o = Walkover
- r = Retired
- d = Defaulted
- SR = Special ranking

=== Finals ===
Semifinals
1	(Hungary) Tímea Babos	6	3	6
3	(United States) Melanie Oudin	4	6	3
4	(Czech Republic) Andrea Hlaváčková	6^{5}	1
7	(United States) Victoria Duval	7^{7}	6

Final
1	(Hungary) Tímea Babos	5	0^{r}
7	(United States) Victoria Duval	7	0

=== Top half ===
First round
1	(Hungary) T Babos	6	6
(Austria) N Rottmann	1	4
(United States) A Mueller	6	7
Q	(United States) T Kinard	1	5
WC	(Canada) M-A Leduc	4	6	3
(Poland) J Jegiołka	6	4	6
WC	(Canada) G Liang	2	2
6	(Tunisia) O Jabeur	6	6
3	(United States) M Oudin	6	6
(Poland) M Domachowska	2	3
(United States) C-Y Hsu	2	6	6
WC	(Canada) F Abanda	6	4	1
(Canada) H El Tabakh	5	6^{2}
Q	(United States) M Harkins	7	7^{7}
(United States) J Abaza	0	3
8	(United States) J Pegula	6	6

Second round
1	(Hungary) T Babos	6	7
(United States) A Mueller	2	5
(Poland) J Jegiołka
6	(Tunisia) O Jabeur	w/o
3	(United States) M Oudin	6	6
(United States) C-Y Hsu	2	1
Q	(United States) M Harkins	2	3
8	(United States) J Pegula	6	6

Quarterfinals
1	(Hungary) T Babos	6	1	6
6	(Tunisia) O Jabeur	3	6	2
3	(United States) M Oudin	6	6
8	(United States) J Pegula	3	4

Semifinals
1	(Hungary) T Babos	6	3	6
3	(United States) M Oudin	4	6	3

=== Bottom half ===
First round
5	(France) A Lim	6	6
Q	(Canada) P Januskova	0	2
LL	(United States) L Litvak	3	6	6
(United States) A Will	6	1	4
(Japan) M Minokoshi	3	5
Q	(Canada) J O'Neill	6	7
LL	(Canada) S Molnar	0	4
4	(Czech Republic) A Hlaváčková	6	6
7	(United States) V Duval	6^{3}	6	7^{7}
(Canada) G Dabrowski	7^{7}	4	6^{1}
(Portugal) B Luz	0	0
(Netherlands) I de Vroome	6	6
(Netherlands) L van Riet	2	1
(United States) J Boserup	6	6
WC	(Canada) É Fournier	1	2
2	(Luxembourg) M Minella	6	6

Second round
5	(France) A Lim	6	6
LL	(United States) L Litvak	4	1
Q	(Canada) J O'Neill	3	1
4	(Czech Republic) A Hlaváčková	6	6
7	(United States) V Duval	7	6
(Netherlands) I de Vroome	5	2
(United States) J Boserup	0	0
2	(Luxembourg) M Minella	6	6

Quarterfinals
5	(France) A Lim	2	2
4	(Czech Republic) A Hlaváčková	6	6
7	(United States) V Duval	6	7
2	(Luxembourg) M Minella	3	5

Semifinals
4	(Czech Republic) A Hlaváčková	6^{5}	1
7	(United States) V Duval	7^{7}	6
