= 2019 Mercer Tennis Classic =

- Date: 21–27 October 2019
- Edition: 7th
- Category: ITF Women's World Tennis Tour
- Prize money: $80,000
- Surface: Hard
- Location: Macon, Georgia, United States

Champions

Singles
- (United States) Katerina Stewart

Doubles
- (United States) Usue Maitane Arconada / (United States) Caroline Dolehide
← 2018 ·	Tennis Classic of Macon	· 2020 →

The 2019 Mercer Tennis Classic was a professional tennis tournament played on outdoor hard courts. It was the seventh edition of the tournament which was part of the 2019 ITF Women's World Tennis Tour. It took place in Macon, Georgia, United States between 21 and 27 October 2019.

== Singles main-draw entrants ==
=== Seeds ===
Country	Player	Rank^{1}	Seed
AUS	Astra Sharma	96	1
USA	Whitney Osuigwe	114	2
SUI	Stefanie Vögele	127	3
USA	Varvara Lepchenko	136	4
USA	Usue Maitane Arconada	139	5
USA	Ann Li	148	6
USA	Caroline Dolehide	166	7
LUX	Mandy Minella	168	8

- ^{1} Rankings are as of 14 October 2019.

=== Other entrants ===
The following players received wildcards into the singles main draw:

- (United States) Katerina Stewart
- (United States) CoCo Vandeweghe
- (United States) Sophia Whittle
- (United States) Alexandra Yepifanova

The following players received entry from the qualifying draw:

- (United States) Elysia Bolton
- (United States) Irina Falconi
- (Russia) Anzhelika Isaeva
- (United States) Sanaz Marand
- (United States) Ingrid Neel
- (Spain) Estela Pérez-Somarriba
- (United States) Gabriella Price
- (Mexico) Andrea Renée Villarreal

== Champions ==
=== Singles ===
- (United States) Katerina Stewart def. (United States) Shelby Rogers, 6–7^{(2–7)}, 6–3, 6–2

=== Doubles ===
- (United States) Usue Maitane Arconada / (United States) Caroline Dolehide def. (Australia) Jaimee Fourlis / (Greece) Valentini Grammatikopoulou, 6–7^{(2–7)}, 6–2, [10–8]
