= 2014 Dothan Pro Tennis Classic – Doubles =

Doubles
- 2014 Dothan Pro Tennis Classic

Final
- Champions: (Estonia) Anett Kontaveit (Belarus) Ilona Kremen
- Runners-up: (United States) Shelby Rogers (Australia) Olivia Rogowska
- Score: 6–1, 5–7, [10–5]

Events
Singles	Doubles
← 2013 ·	Dothan Pro Tennis Classic	· 2015 →

Julia Cohen and Tatjana Maria were the defending champions, having won the event in 2013, but Maria chose not to participate in 2014. Cohen partnered Nicola Slater, but they lost in the first round.

Anett Kontaveit and Ilona Kremen won the tournament, defeating Shelby Rogers and Olivia Rogowska in the final, 6–1, 5–7, [10–5].

== Seeds ==
1. (United States) Irina Falconi / (United States) Maria Sanchez (quarterfinals)
2. (United States) Asia Muhammad / (United States) Taylor Townsend (semifinals; withdrew)
3. (Paraguay) Verónica Cepede Royg / (Argentina) Florencia Molinero (quarterfinals)
4. (United States) Jan Abaza / (United States) Allie Will (first round)

== Draw ==
=== Key ===
- Q = Qualifier
- WC = Wild card
- LL = Lucky loser
- Alt = Alternate
- SE = Special exempt
- PR = Protected ranking
- ITF = ITF entry
- JE = Junior exempt
- w/o = Walkover
- r = Retired
- d = Defaulted
- SR = Special ranking

First round
1	(United States) I Falconi (United States) M Sanchez	7	6
(United States) J Cohen (United Kingdom) N Slater	5	4
(United States) S Rogers (Australia) O Rogowska	6	7^{7}
(United States) J Cako (United States) M Harkins	1	6^{3}
4	(United States) J Abaza (United States) A Will	0	2
(Serbia) T Čurović (Bulgaria) D Evtimova	6	6
(United States) E Harman (United States) A Weinhold	2	2
(United States) L Chirico (United States) S Marand	6	6
(Norway) U Eikeri (United States) C-Y Hsu	2	1
(Estonia) A Kontaveit (Belarus) I Kremen	6	6
(United States) N Melichar (United States) N Pluskota	5	6	[8]
3	(Paraguay) V Cepede Royg (Argentina) F Molinero	7	3	[10]
WC	(United States) D Lao (United States) K Wong	3	1
WC	(United States) G Min (United States) M Oudin	6	6
(Canada) H El Tabakh (United States) A Kiick	1	1
2	(United States) A Muhammad (United States) T Townsend	6	6

Quarterfinals
1	(United States) I Falconi (United States) M Sanchez	4	3
(United States) S Rogers (Australia) O Rogowska	6	6
(Serbia) T Čurović (Bulgaria) D Evtimova	6	3	[3]
(United States) L Chirico (United States) S Marand	1	6	[10]
(Estonia) A Kontaveit (Belarus) I Kremen	6	6
3	(Paraguay) V Cepede Royg (Argentina) F Molinero	4	4
WC	(United States) G Min (United States) M Oudin
2	(United States) A Muhammad (United States) T Townsend	w/o

Semifinals
(United States) S Rogers (Australia) O Rogowska	w/o
(United States) L Chirico (United States) S Marand
(Estonia) A Kontaveit (Belarus) I Kremen	w/o
2	(United States) A Muhammad (United States) T Townsend

Final
(United States) S Rogers (Australia) O Rogowska	1	7	[5]
(Estonia) A Kontaveit (Belarus) I Kremen	6	5	[10]
