= 2019 Mercer Tennis Classic – Doubles =

Doubles
- 2019 Mercer Tennis Classic

Final
- Champions: (United States) Usue Maitane Arconada (United States) Caroline Dolehide
- Runners-up: (Australia) Jaimee Fourlis (Greece) Valentini Grammatikopoulou
- Score: 6–7^{(2–7)}, 6–2, [10–8]

Events
Singles	Doubles
← 2018 ·	Tennis Classic of Macon	· 2020 →

Caty McNally and Jessica Pegula were the defending champions, but chose not to participate.

Usue Maitane Arconada and Caroline Dolehide won the title, defeating Jaimee Fourlis and Valentini Grammatikopoulou in the final, 6–7^{(2–7)}, 6–2, [10–8].

== Seeds ==
1. (Sweden) Johanna Larsson / (Luxembourg) Mandy Minella (quarterfinals)
2. (Australia) Ellen Perez / (Australia) Astra Sharma (quarterfinals)
3. (United States) Usue Maitane Arconada / (United States) Caroline Dolehide (champions)
4. (Indonesia) Beatrice Gumulya / (Indonesia) Jessy Rompies (first round)

== Draw ==
=== Key ===
- Q = Qualifier
- WC = Wild card
- LL = Lucky loser
- Alt = Alternate
- SE = Special exempt
- PR = Protected ranking
- ITF = ITF entry
- JE = Junior exempt
- w/o = Walkover
- r = Retired
- d = Defaulted
- SR = Special ranking

=== Draw ===
First round
1	(Sweden) J Larsson (Luxembourg) M Minella	6	6
(United States) A Daniell (United States) A Nefedova	3	4
(Australia) J Fourlis (Greece) V Grammatikopoulou	6	6
(United States) E Able (United States) E Turner	4	2
4	(Indonesia) B Gumulya (Indonesia) J Rompies	4	7	[2]
(Mexico) G Olmos (United States) W Osuigwe	6	5	[10]
(United States) A Mueller (United States) S Whittle	7	6
(Russia) A Gabueva (Russia) A Sukhotina	5	2
(United States) S Marand (United States) I Neel	6	6
WC	(United States) V Flores (United States) K Jones	3	3
(United States) H Chang (Romania) G Talabă	2	1
3	(United States) UM Arconada (United States) C Dolehide	6	6
WC	(Russia) A Kudryavtseva (United States) V Lepchenko	6	4	[7]
(Netherlands) S Lamens (Russia) M Melnikova	2	6	[10]
(United States) R McAdoo (United States) K Stewart	4	4
2	(Australia) E Perez (Australia) A Sharma	6	6

Quarterfinals
1	(Sweden) J Larsson (Luxembourg) M Minella	1	6^{6}
(Australia) J Fourlis (Greece) V Grammatikopoulou	6	7^{8}
(Mexico) G Olmos (United States) W Osuigwe	4	2
(United States) A Mueller (United States) S Whittle	6	6
(United States) S Marand (United States) I Neel	3	6	[8]
3	(United States) UM Arconada (United States) C Dolehide	6	3	[10]
(Netherlands) S Lamens (Russia) M Melnikova	4	7	[10]
2	(Australia) E Perez (Australia) A Sharma	6	5	[7]

Semifinals
(Australia) J Fourlis (Greece) V Grammatikopoulou	6	5	[10]
(United States) A Mueller (United States) S Whittle	3	7	[8]
3	(United States) UM Arconada (United States) C Dolehide	6	7
(Netherlands) S Lamens (Russia) M Melnikova	2	5

Final
(Australia) J Fourlis (Greece) V Grammatikopoulou	7^{7}	2	[8]
3	(United States) UM Arconada (United States) C Dolehide	6^{2}	6	[10]
