= 2018 Mercer Tennis Classic – Doubles =

Doubles
- 2018 Mercer Tennis Classic

Final
- Champions: (United States) Caty McNally (United States) Jessica Pegula
- Runners-up: (Kazakhstan) Anna Danilina (United States) Ingrid Neel
- Score: 6–1, 5–7, [11–9]

Events
Singles	Doubles
← 2017 ·	Tennis Classic of Macon	· 2019 →

Kaitlyn Christian and Sabrina Santamaria were the defending champions, but chose not to participate.

Caty McNally and Jessica Pegula won the title, defeating Anna Danilina and Ingrid Neel in the final, 6–1, 5–7, [11–9].

== Seeds ==
1. (Chile) Alexa Guarachi / (Mexico) Giuliana Olmos (semifinals)
2. (United States) Sophie Chang / (United States) Alexandra Mueller (first round)
3. (United States) Nicole Gibbs / (United States) Asia Muhammad (first round)
4. (United States) Lauren Davis / (United States) Christina McHale (quarterfinals)

== Draw ==
=== Key ===
- Q = Qualifier
- WC = Wild card
- LL = Lucky loser
- Alt = Alternate
- SE = Special exempt
- PR = Protected ranking
- ITF = ITF entry
- JE = Junior exempt
- w/o = Walkover
- r = Retired
- d = Defaulted
- SR = Special ranking

=== Draw ===
First round
1	(Chile) A Guarachi (Mexico) G Olmos	6	6
(France) V Muntean (Romania) G Talabă	0	1
(United States) S Marand (United States) W Osuigwe	6	6
WC	(United States) H Baptiste (United States) P Stearns	1	4
4	(United States) L Davis (United States) C McHale	6	1	[10]
(Chinese Taipei) C-y Hsu (Indonesia) J Rompies	4	6	[7]
(Kazakhstan) A Danilina (United States) I Neel	w/o
(United States) M Brengle (United States) A Kratzer
(South Africa) C Simmonds (Venezuela) A Uzcátegui	0	0
(United States) Q Gleason (Brazil) L Stefani	6	6
(United States) C McNally (United States) J Pegula	6	6
3	(United States) N Gibbs (United States) A Muhammad	3	2
(Brazil) PC Gonçalves (Brazil) B Haddad Maia	6	7
(Norway) U Eikeri (Mexico) AS Sánchez	4	5
(Indonesia) B Gumulya (Montenegro) A Veselinović	6	2	[10]
2	(United States) S Chang (United States) A Mueller	3	6	[4]

Quarterfinals
1	(Chile) A Guarachi (Mexico) G Olmos	6	4	[13]
(United States) S Marand (United States) W Osuigwe	4	6	[11]
4	(United States) L Davis (United States) C McHale	7^{7}	4	[5]
(Kazakhstan) A Danilina (United States) I Neel	6^{3}	6	[10]
(United States) Q Gleason (Brazil) L Stefani	6	3	[1]
(United States) C McNally (United States) J Pegula	4	6	[10]
(Brazil) PC Gonçalves (Brazil) B Haddad Maia	2	6	[6]
(Indonesia) B Gumulya (Montenegro) A Veselinović	6	4	[10]

Semifinals
1	(Chile) A Guarachi (Mexico) G Olmos	6	3	[7]
(Kazakhstan) A Danilina (United States) I Neel	3	6	[10]
(United States) C McNally (United States) J Pegula	6	6
(Indonesia) B Gumulya (Montenegro) A Veselinović	2	1

Final
(Kazakhstan) A Danilina (United States) I Neel	1	7	[9]
(United States) C McNally (United States) J Pegula	6	5	[11]
