= 2020 Mercer Tennis Classic – Doubles =

Doubles
- 2020 Mercer Tennis Classic

Final
- Champions: (Poland) Magdalena Fręch (Poland) Katarzyna Kawa
- Runners-up: (United States) Francesca Di Lorenzo (United States) Jamie Loeb
- Score: 7–5, 6–1

Events
Singles	Doubles
← 2019 ·	Mercer Tennis Classic	· 2021 →

Usue Maitane Arconada and Caroline Dolehide were the defending champions but chose to participate with different partners. Arconada partnered Marta Kostyuk but lost in the first round to Francesca Di Lorenzo and Jamie Loeb. Dolehide partnered Caty McNally, but lost in the semifinals to Magdalena Fręch and Katarzyna Kawa.

Fręch and Kawa went on to win the title, defeating Di Lorenzo and Loeb in the final, 7–5, 6–1.

== Seeds ==
1. (United States) Caroline Dolehide / (United States) Caty McNally (semifinals)
2. (Japan) Misaki Doi / (Serbia) Nina Stojanović (semifinals)
3. (United States) Usue Maitane Arconada / (Ukraine) Marta Kostyuk (first round)
4. (Kazakhstan) Anna Danilina / (India) Ankita Raina (quarterfinals)

== Draw ==
=== Key ===
- Q = Qualifier
- WC = Wild card
- LL = Lucky loser
- Alt = Alternate
- SE = Special exempt
- PR = Protected ranking
- ITF = ITF entry
- JE = Junior exempt
- w/o = Walkover
- r = Retired
- d = Defaulted
- SR = Special ranking

=== Draw ===
First round
1	(United States) C Dolehide (United States) C McNally	6	6
WC	(United States) H Baptiste (United States) W Osuigwe	3	1
WC	(Japan) N Kawaguchi (Colombia) C Osorio	3	2
Alt	(Belgium) M Benoît (Mexico) R Zarazúa	6	6
4	(Kazakhstan) A Danilina (India) A Raina	6	6
(United Kingdom) N Broady (New Zealand) E Routliffe	3	4
(Poland) M Fręch (Poland) K Kawa	5	6	[10]
(Spain) L Arruabarrena (Italy) S Errani	7	1	[8]
(United States) I Neel (United States) C Whoriskey	7	1	[10]
(Ukraine) K Bondarenko (Belarus) O Govortsova	5	6	[6]
(United States) F Di Lorenzo (United States) J Loeb	0	7	[10]
3	(United States) UM Arconada (Ukraine) M Kostyuk	6	5	[7]
(Poland) P Kania-Choduń (Poland) K Piter	5	7	[7]
(Australia) A Sharma (Egypt) M Sherif	7	5	[10]
(Belgium) G Minnen (United States) S Vickery	3	6^{3}
2	(Japan) M Doi (Serbia) N Stojanović	6	7^{7}

Quarterfinals
1	(United States) C Dolehide (United States) C McNally	6	7^{7}
Alt	(Belgium) M Benoît (Mexico) R Zarazúa	1	6^{3}
4	(Kazakhstan) A Danilina (India) A Raina	4	6	[6]
(Poland) M Fręch (Poland) K Kawa	6	4	[10]
(United States) I Neel (United States) C Whoriskey	6	2	[6]
(United States) F Di Lorenzo (United States) J Loeb	3	6	[10]
(Australia) A Sharma (Egypt) M Sherif	6	6^{11}	[1]
2	(Japan) M Doi (Serbia) N Stojanović	4	7^{13}	[10]

Semifinals
1	(United States) C Dolehide (United States) C McNally	4	3
(Poland) M Fręch (Poland) K Kawa	6	6
(United States) F Di Lorenzo (United States) J Loeb	1	6	[10]
2	(Japan) M Doi (Serbia) N Stojanović	6	3	[8]

Final
(Poland) M Fręch (Poland) K Kawa	7	6
(United States) F Di Lorenzo (United States) J Loeb	5	1
