= 2014 Dothan Pro Tennis Classic – Singles =

Singles
- 2014 Dothan Pro Tennis Classic

Final
- Champion: (United States) Grace Min
- Runner-up: (United States) Victoria Duval
- Score: 6–3, 6–1

Events
| Singles | Doubles |
| ← 2013 · | Dothan Pro Tennis Classic | · 2015 → |

Ajla Tomljanović was the defending champion, having won the event in 2013, but chose not to participate.

Grace Min won the tournament, defeating Victoria Duval in the final, 6–3, 6–1.

== Seeds ==
1. (Belarus) Olga Govortsova (semifinals)
2. (United States) Shelby Rogers (first round)
3. (Portugal) Michelle Larcher de Brito (second round)
4. (Australia) Olivia Rogowska (second round)
5. (United States) Melanie Oudin (quarterfinals)
6. (United States) Irina Falconi (second round)
7. (Paraguay) Verónica Cepede Royg (quarterfinals)
8. (United States) Victoria Duval (final)

== Main draw ==
=== Key ===
- Q = Qualifier
- WC = Wild card
- LL = Lucky loser
- Alt = Alternate
- SE = Special exempt
- PR = Protected ranking
- ITF = ITF entry
- JE = Junior exempt
- w/o = Walkover
- r = Retired
- d = Defaulted
- SR = Special ranking

=== Finals ===
Semifinals
1/WC | (Belarus) Olga Govortsova | 6^{5} | 2
8 | (United States) Victoria Duval | 7^{7} | 6
(United States) Allie Kiick | 3 | 4
(United States) Grace Min | 6 | 6

Final
8 | (United States) Victoria Duval | 3 | 1
(United States) Grace Min | 6 | 6

=== Top half ===
First round
1/WC | (Belarus) O Govortsova | 6 | 2 | 6
(Slovenia) P Rampre | 3 | 6 | 1
WC | (United States) L Chirico | 6 | 6^{6} | 6
(Slovenia) N Kolar | 4 | 7^{8} | 2
(Russia) P Vinogradova | 6 | 6^{4} | 6
(United States) J Cohen | 2 | 7^{7} | 2
(Argentina) F Molinero | 0 | 2
5/WC | (United States) M Oudin | 6 | 6
3 | (Portugal) M Larcher de Brito | 6 | 6
(Kazakhstan) S Karatantcheva | 4 | 2
(United States) C-Y Hsu | 4 | 3
(Estonia) A Kontaveit | 6 | 6
WC | (United States) T Townsend | 6 | 6
(Paraguay) M González | 3 | 2
Q | (United States) P Porter | 2 | 6 | 3
8 | (United States) V Duval | 6 | 2 | 6

Second round
1/WC | (Belarus) O Govortsova | 7^{13} | 6
WC | (United States) L Chirico | 6^{11} | 2
(Russia) P Vinogradova | 0 | 5
5/WC | (United States) M Oudin | 6 | 7
3 | (Portugal) M Larcher de Brito | 1 | 2
(Estonia) A Kontaveit | 6 | 6
WC | (United States) T Townsend | 4 | 2
8 | (United States) V Duval | 6 | 6

Quarterfinals
1/WC | (Belarus) O Govortsova | 6 | 6
5/WC | (United States) M Oudin | 2 | 4
(Estonia) A Kontaveit | 4 | 4
8 | (United States) V Duval | 6 | 6

Semifinals
1/WC | (Belarus) O Govortsova | 6^{5} | 2
8 | (United States) V Duval | 7^{7} | 6

=== Bottom half ===
First round
6 | (United States) I Falconi | 6 | 6
(Australia) An Rodionova | 3 | 1
(United States) M Sanchez | 6 | 0 | 5
(United States) A Kiick | 4 | 6 | 7
Q | (Norway) U Eikeri | 6 | 2 | 1
(Kazakhstan) Y Putintseva | 3 | 6 | 6
Q | (United States) D Lao | 5 | 6 | 2
4 | (Australia) O Rogowska | 7 | 3 | 6
7 | (Paraguay) V Cepede Royg | 6 | 6
(Ukraine) L Tsurenko | 1 | 3
Q | (Ukraine) A Kalinina | 6 | 6
(Austria) M Klaffner | 3 | 3
(United States) G Min | 6 | 6
(Canada) H El Tabakh | 2 | 2
(Belarus) I Kremen | 2 | 6 | 7^{7}
2 | (United States) S Rogers | 6 | 1 | 6^{3}

Second round
6 | (United States) I Falconi | 6 | 3 | 0
(United States) A Kiick | 4 | 6 | 6
(Kazakhstan) Y Putintseva | 6 | 7
4 | (Australia) O Rogowska | 4 | 5
7 | (Paraguay) V Cepede Royg | 6 | 6
Q | (Ukraine) A Kalinina | 2 | 3
(United States) G Min | 6 | 6
(Belarus) I Kremen | 2 | 4

Quarterfinals
(United States) A Kiick | 6 | 6
(Kazakhstan) Y Putintseva | 4 | 3
7 | (Paraguay) V Cepede Royg | 5 | 6 | 3
(United States) G Min | 7 | 4 | 6

Semifinals
(United States) A Kiick | 3 | 4
(United States) G Min | 6 | 6
