= 2022 Mercer Tennis Classic – Doubles =

Doubles
- 2022 Mercer Tennis Classic

Final
- Champions: (United States) Anna Rogers (United States) Christina Rosca
- Runners-up: (United States) Madison Brengle (United States) Maria Mateas
- Score: 6–4, 6–4

Events
Singles	Doubles
← 2021 ·	Tennis Classic of Macon	· 2023 →

Quinn Gleason and Catherine Harrison were the defending champions but chose not to participate.

Anna Rogers and Christina Rosca won the title, defeating Madison Brengle and Maria Mateas in the final, 6–4, 6–4.

== Seeds ==
1. (United States) Anna Rogers / (United States) Christina Rosca (champions)
2. (Australia) Alexandra Osborne / (United States) Adriana Reami (semifinals)
3. (United States) Madison Brengle / (United States) Maria Mateas (final)
4. (Brazil) Thaisa Grana Pedretti / (Argentina) Nadia Podoroska (quarterfinals, withdrew)

== Draw ==
=== Key ===
- Q = Qualifier
- WC = Wild card
- LL = Lucky loser
- Alt = Alternate
- SE = Special exempt
- PR = Protected ranking
- ITF = ITF entry
- JE = Junior exempt
- w/o = Walkover
- r = Retired
- d = Defaulted
- SR = Special ranking

=== Draw ===
First round
1	(United States) A Rogers (United States) C Rosca	6	6
(United States) V Osuigwe (United States) W Osuigwe	2	2
(India) R Bhatia (Bulgaria) D Evtimova	6	6
WC	(United States) M Courville (Serbia) T Ristić	2	3
4	(Brazil) TG Pedretti (Argentina) N Podoroska	6	6
(United States) S Mohamad (United States) R Newborn	2	2
(United States) C Ansari (Canada) A Arseneault	6	6
(Latvia) L Dekmeijere (Sweden) F Norin	1	1
(Bulgaria) E Danailova (Czech Republic) L Petruželová	7^{7}	6
(Canada) B Fernandez (Poland) O Lincer	6^{4}	1
(United States) A Urhobo (United States) M Yamakita	1	1
3	(United States) M Brengle (United States) M Mateas	6	6
WC	(United States) M Aubuchon (United States) M Lewis	6	4	[10]
WC	(Italy) C Ciaccia (Germany) ES Schlagenhauf	3	6	[3]
(United States) S Ewing (United States) A Smith	7^{7}	4	[7]
2	(Australia) A Osborne (United States) A Reami	6^{3}	6	[10]

Quarterfinals
1	(United States) A Rogers (United States) C Rosca	7^{7}	6
(India) R Bhatia (Bulgaria) D Evtimova	6^{3}	4
4	(Brazil) TG Pedretti (Argentina) N Podoroska
(United States) C Ansari (Canada) A Arseneault	w/o
(Bulgaria) E Danailova (Czech Republic) L Petruželová	0	0
3	(United States) M Brengle (United States) M Mateas	6	6
WC	(United States) M Aubuchon (United States) M Lewis	4	5
2	(Australia) A Osborne (United States) A Reami	6	7

Semifinals
1	(United States) A Rogers (United States) C Rosca	6	6
(United States) C Ansari (Canada) A Arseneault	3	3
3	(United States) M Brengle (United States) M Mateas	6	6
2	(Australia) A Osborne (United States) A Reami	2	3

Final
1	(United States) A Rogers (United States) C Rosca	6	6
3	(United States) M Brengle (United States) M Mateas	4	4
