= 2022 Mercer Tennis Classic – Singles =

Singles
- 2022 Mercer Tennis Classic

Final
- Champion: (United States) Madison Brengle
- Runner-up: (Hungary) Panna Udvardy
- Score: 6–3, 6–1

Events
Singles	Doubles
← 2021 ·	Tennis Classic of Macon	· 2023 →

Madison Brengle was the defending champion and successfully defended her title, defeating Panna Udvardy in the final, 6–3, 6–1.

== Seeds ==
1. (United States) Madison Brengle (champion)
2. (Hungary) Panna Udvardy (final)
3. (Sweden) Rebecca Peterson (withdrew)
4. (United States) Katie Volynets (semifinals)
5. (United States) Emma Navarro (quarterfinals)
6. (United States) Katrina Scott (first round)
7. (United States) Taylor Townsend (quarterfinals)
8. (Argentina) Nadia Podoroska (quarterfinals)

== Draw ==
=== Key ===
- Q = Qualifier
- WC = Wild card
- LL = Lucky loser
- Alt = Alternate
- SE = Special exempt
- PR = Protected ranking
- ITF = ITF entry
- JE = Junior exempt
- w/o = Walkover
- r = Retired
- d = Defaulted
- SR = Special ranking

=== Finals ===
Semifinals
1	(United States) Madison Brengle	6	6
4	(United States) Katie Volynets	2	3
(Brazil) Thaisa Grana Pedretti	5	6^{3}
2	(Hungary) Panna Udvardy	7	7^{7}

Final
1	(United States) Madison Brengle	6	6
2	(Hungary) Panna Udvardy	3	1

=== Top half ===
First round
1	(United States) M Brengle	6	6
(United States) C Rosca	4	0
WC	(United States) R Crowder	4	3
(United States) H Inoue	6	6
LL	(United States) A Urhobo	6	6
(Bulgaria) D Evtimova	3	1
(Japan) H Kuwata	1	0
7	(United States) T Townsend	6	6
4	(United States) K Volynets	6	6
LL	(Israel) T Barad Itzhaki	0	2
WC	(United States) A Rogers	7	1	6
PR	(United States) M Mateas	5	6	4
(United States) W Osuigwe	6	6
Q	(United States) V Hu	2	1
(India) R Bhatia	3	0
5	(United States) E Navarro	6	6

Second round
1	(United States) M Brengle	6	6
(United States) H Inoue	3	3
LL	(United States) A Urhobo	2	0
7	(United States) T Townsend	6	6
4	(United States) K Volynets	6	6
WC	(United States) A Rogers	3	3
(United States) W Osuigwe	4	3
5	(United States) E Navarro	6	6

Quarterfinals
1	(United States) M Brengle	6	6
7	(United States) T Townsend	3	3
4	(United States) K Volynets	6	6^{7}	6
5	(United States) E Navarro	3	7^{9}	3

Semifinals
1	(United States) M Brengle	6	6
4	(United States) K Volynets	2	3

=== Bottom half ===
First round
8	(Argentina) N Podoroska	6	6
WC	(United States) S Crawford	2	2
Q	(United States) C Ansari	2	2
Q	(Canada) A Arseneault	6	6
(United States) A Reami	6	3	2
(Brazil) TG Pedretti	4	6	6
Q	(Poland) O Lincer	2	7	6
LL	(United States) S Ewing	6	5	0
6/WC	(United States) K Scott	5	3
(Ukraine) K Volodko	7	6
Q	(Canada) B Fernandez	3	1
Q	(Sweden) L Zaar	6	6
Q	(United States) A Smith	4	4
(United States) G Min	6	6
Q	(United States) V Osuigwe	2	7^{8}	3
2	(Hungary) P Udvardy	6	6^{6}	6

Second round
8	(Argentina) N Podoroska	6	6
Q	(Canada) A Arseneault	2	3
(Brazil) TG Pedretti	6	6
Q	(Poland) O Lincer	1	0
(Ukraine) K Volodko	6	2	6
Q	(Sweden) L Zaar	1	6	3
(United States) G Min
2	(Hungary) P Udvardy	w/o

Quarterfinals
8	(Argentina) N Podoroska	6^{4}	4
(Brazil) TG Pedretti	7^{7}	6
(Ukraine) K Volodko	2	1
2	(Hungary) P Udvardy	6	6

Semifinals
(Brazil) TG Pedretti	5	6^{3}
2	(Hungary) P Udvardy	7	7^{7}
