= 2019 Mercer Tennis Classic – Singles =

Singles
- 2019 Mercer Tennis Classic

Final
- Champion: (United States) Katerina Stewart
- Runner-up: (United States) Shelby Rogers
- Score: 6–7^{(2–7)}, 6–3, 6–2

Events
Singles	Doubles
← 2018 ·	Tennis Classic of Macon	· 2020 →

Varvara Lepchenko was the defending champion, but retired in the first round against CoCo Vandeweghe.

Katerina Stewart won the title, defeating Shelby Rogers in an all-American final, 6–7^{(2–7)}, 6–3, 6–2.

== Seeds ==
1. (Australia) Astra Sharma (second round)
2. (United States) Whitney Osuigwe (quarterfinals)
3. (Switzerland) Stefanie Vögele (quarterfinals)
4. (United States) Varvara Lepchenko (first round, retired)
5. (United States) Usue Maitane Arconada (second round)
6. (United States) Ann Li (second round)
7. (United States) Caroline Dolehide (second round)
8. (Luxembourg) Mandy Minella (first round)

== Draw ==
=== Key ===
- Q = Qualifier
- WC = Wild card
- LL = Lucky loser
- Alt = Alternate
- SE = Special exempt
- PR = Protected ranking
- ITF = ITF entry
- JE = Junior exempt
- w/o = Walkover
- r = Retired
- d = Defaulted
- SR = Special ranking

=== Finals ===
Semifinals
WC	(United States) Katerina Stewart	6	6
(United States) Danielle Lao	3	0
(United States) Shelby Rogers	6	6
(United States) Grace Min	4	2

Final
WC	(United States) Katerina Stewart	6^{2}	6	6
(United States) Shelby Rogers	7^{7}	3	2

=== Top half ===
First round
1	(Australia) A Sharma	6	6
WC	(United States) A Yepifanova	1	0
Q	(United States) I Falconi	6	6
(Greece) V Grammatikopoulou	2	3
(United States) H Chang	6	6^{1}	2
WC	(United States) K Stewart	0	7^{7}	6
Q	(Spain) E Pérez Somarriba	5	4
7	(United States) C Dolehide	7	6
3	(Switzerland) S Vögele	4	6	6
(Romania) G Talabă	6	3	0
Q	(United States) S Marand	6	6
Q	(United States) I Neel	3	3
(Sweden) J Larsson	0	4
(United States) D Lao	6	6
Q	(Russia) A Isaeva	3	1
6	(United States) A Li	6	6

Second round
1	(Australia) A Sharma	3	6	5
Q	(United States) I Falconi	6	1	7
WC	(United States) K Stewart	6	3	6
7	(United States) C Dolehide	4	6	3
3	(Switzerland) S Vögele	6	6
Q	(United States) S Marand	2	0
(United States) D Lao	6	6
6	(United States) A Li	2	4

Quarterfinals
Q	(United States) I Falconi	4	6^{2}
WC	(United States) K Stewart	6	7^{7}
3	(Switzerland) S Vögele	1	2
(United States) D Lao	6	6

Semifinals
WC	(United States) K Stewart	6	6
(United States) D Lao	3	0

=== Bottom half ===
First round
5	(United States) UM Arconada	6	6
(Australia) J Fourlis	2	2
(United States) S Rogers	6	6
Q	(United States) G Price	4	1
(Russia) M Melnikova	7	6
(Australia) E Perez	5	4
WC	(United States) C Vandeweghe	3
4	(United States) V Lepchenko	4^{r}
8	(Luxembourg) M Minella	1	2
(Mexico) G Olmos	6	6
(United States) G Min	7	6
WC	(United States) S Whittle	5	3
Q	(United States) E Bolton	7	6
(United States) A Parks	5	1
Q	(Mexico) AR Villarreal	3	1
2	(United States) W Osuigwe	6	6

Second round
5	(United States) UM Arconada	0	1
(United States) S Rogers	6	6
(Russia) M Melnikova	6^{6}	4
WC	(United States) C Vandeweghe	7^{8}	6
(Mexico) G Olmos	3	2
(United States) G Min	6	6
Q	(United States) E Bolton	6	4	4
2	(United States) W Osuigwe	2	6	6

Quarterfinals
(United States) S Rogers	6	6
WC	(United States) C Vandeweghe	0	0
(United States) G Min	6	6
2	(United States) W Osuigwe	1	3

Semifinals
(United States) S Rogers	6	6
(United States) G Min	4	2
