= 2018 Mercer Tennis Classic – Singles =

Singles
- 2018 Mercer Tennis Classic

Final
- Champion: (United States) Varvara Lepchenko
- Runner-up: (Paraguay) Verónica Cepede Royg
- Score: 6–4, 6–4

Events
| Singles | Doubles |
| ← 2017 · | Tennis Classic of Macon | · 2019 → |

Anna Karolína Schmiedlová was the defending champion, but chose to compete in Poitiers instead.

Varvara Lepchenko won the title, defeating Verónica Cepede Royg in the final, 6–4, 6–4.

== Seeds ==
1. (United States) Madison Brengle (first round)
2. (United States) Jessica Pegula (quarterfinals)
3. (Russia) Sofya Zhuk (first round)
4. (United States) Claire Liu (first round)
5. (United States) Nicole Gibbs (first round)
6. (United States) Kristie Ahn (first round)
7. (Czech Republic) Marie Bouzková (semifinals, retired)
8. (United States) Christina McHale (first round)

== Draw ==
=== Key ===
- Q = Qualifier
- WC = Wild card
- LL = Lucky loser
- Alt = Alternate
- SE = Special exempt
- PR = Protected ranking
- ITF = ITF entry
- JE = Junior exempt
- w/o = Walkover
- r = Retired
- d = Defaulted
- SR = Special ranking

=== Finals ===
Semifinals
(United States) Varvara Lepchenko | 6 | 6
(United States) Allie Kiick | 4 | 2
(Paraguay) Verónica Cepede Royg | 6 | 2
7 | (Czech Republic) Marie Bouzková | 3 | 0^{r}

Final
(United States) Varvara Lepchenko | 6 | 6
(Paraguay) Verónica Cepede Royg | 4 | 4

=== Top half ===
First round
1 | (United States) M Brengle | 3 | 3
(United States) D Lao | 6 | 6
Q | (United States) L Chirico | 7^{7} | 6
(Brazil) B Haddad Maia | 6^{4} | 4
(United States) A Kratzer | 1 | 3
(United States) V Lepchenko | 6 | 6
(United States) W Osuigwe | 7 | 6
8/WC | (United States) C McHale | 5 | 0
4 | (United States) C Liu | 6^{7} | 4
(United States) K Day | 7^{9} | 6
(United States) L Davis | 6 | 6
(United States) G Brodsky | 4 | 3
(Japan) K Nara | 5 | 6^{4}
(United States) S Chang | 7 | 7^{7}
(United States) A Kiick | 6 | 4 | 6
6 | (United States) K Ahn | 4 | 6 | 0

Second round
(United States) D Lao | 6 | 3 | 6
Q | (United States) L Chirico | 2 | 6 | 2
(United States) V Lepchenko | 6 | 6
(United States) W Osuigwe | 4 | 0
(United States) K Day | 6 | 6
(United States) L Davis | 4 | 4
(United States) S Chang | 2 | 2
(United States) A Kiick | 6 | 6

Quarterfinals
(United States) D Lao | 2 | 5
(United States) V Lepchenko | 6 | 7
(United States) K Day | 2 | 5
(United States) A Kiick | 6 | 7

Semifinals
(United States) V Lepchenko | 6 | 6
(United States) A Kiick | 4 | 2

=== Bottom half ===
First round
5 | (United States) N Gibbs | 6 | 5 | 0
(United States) A Li | 2 | 7 | 6
Q | (United States) H Baptiste | 1 | 6 | 6
(United States) A Muhammad | 6 | 3 | 1
(Paraguay) V Cepede Royg | 4 | 6 | 6
(United States) G Min | 6 | 4 | 4
(Norway) U Eikeri | 6 | 6
3 | (Russia) S Zhuk | 0 | 2
7 | (Czech Republic) M Bouzková | 7 | 6
WC | (Chile) A Guarachi | 5 | 2
(Canada) F Abanda | 1 | 2
(Bulgaria) S Karatantcheva | 6 | 6
Q | (Mexico) G Olmos | 6 | 7
(Mexico) AS Sánchez | 2 | 5
Q | (United States) S Marand | 6 | 3 | 1
2 | (United States) J Pegula | 2 | 6 | 6

Second round
(United States) A Li | 4 | 4
Q | (United States) H Baptiste | 6 | 6
(Paraguay) V Cepede Royg | 6 | 6
(Norway) U Eikeri | 1 | 0
7 | (Czech Republic) M Bouzková | 4 | 6 | 7
(Bulgaria) S Karatantcheva | 6 | 4 | 5
Q | (Mexico) G Olmos | 2 | 0
2 | (United States) J Pegula | 6 | 6

Quarterfinals
Q | (United States) H Baptiste | 4 | 4
(Paraguay) V Cepede Royg | 6 | 6
7 | (Czech Republic) M Bouzková | 7 | 6
2 | (United States) J Pegula | 5 | 2

Semifinals
(Paraguay) V Cepede Royg | 6 | 2
7 | (Czech Republic) M Bouzková | 3 | 0^{r}
