= 2017 Tennis Classic of Macon – Singles =

Singles
- 2017 Tennis Classic of Macon

Final
- Champion: (Slovakia) Anna Karolína Schmiedlová
- Runner-up: (United States) Victoria Duval
- Score: 6–4, 6–1

Events
Singles	Doubles
← 2016 ·	Tennis Classic of Macon	· 2018 →

Kayla Day was the defending champion, but lost in the semifinal to Victoria Duval.

Anna Karolína Schmiedlová won the title after defeating Duval 6–4, 6–1 in the final.

== Seeds ==
1. (Italy) Francesca Schiavone (second round)
2. (Ukraine) Kateryna Bondarenko (first round)
3. (United States) Nicole Gibbs (first round)
4. (United States) Sachia Vickery (first round)
5. (United States) Sofia Kenin (first round)
6. (United States) Kristie Ahn (first round)
7. (United States) Taylor Townsend (first round)
8. (United States) Kayla Day (semifinals)

== Draw ==
=== Key ===
- Q = Qualifier
- WC = Wild card
- LL = Lucky loser
- Alt = Alternate
- SE = Special exempt
- PR = Protected ranking
- ITF = ITF entry
- JE = Junior exempt
- w/o = Walkover
- r = Retired
- d = Defaulted
- SR = Special ranking

=== Finals ===
Semifinals
(Sweden) Rebecca Peterson	3	4
(Slovakia) Anna Karolína Schmiedlová	6	6
WC	(United States) Victoria Duval	6	6
8	(United States) Kayla Day	1	3

Final
(Slovakia) Anna Karolína Schmiedlová	6	6
WC	(United States) Victoria Duval	4	1

=== Top half ===
First round
1	(Italy) F Schiavone	6	6
Q	(United States) A Weinhold	2	3
(United States) A Anisimova	4	7^{7}	3
(Bulgaria) S Karatantcheva	6	6^{3}	6
(Turkey) Ç Büyükakçay	6	7
(United States) L Chirico	4	5
(Sweden) R Peterson	6	6
5	(United States) K Ahn	4	1
4	(United States) S Vickery	5	3
(United States) G Min	7	6
WC	(United States) K Stewart	7^{7}	3	2
(Slovakia) AK Schmiedlová	6^{5}	6	6
(Switzerland) S Vögele	6	7
(New Zealand) M Erakovic	3	5
Q	(United States) A Li	3	7^{7}	7
7	(United States) T Townsend	6	6^{2}	5

Second round
1	(Italy) F Schiavone	2	1
(Bulgaria) S Karatantcheva	6	6
(Turkey) Ç Büyükakçay	3	3
(Sweden) R Peterson	6	6
(United States) G Min	6^{5}	6	2
(Slovakia) AK Schmiedlová	7^{7}	2	6
(Switzerland) S Vögele	6	6
Q	(United States) A Li	3	2

Quarterfinals
(Bulgaria) S Karatantcheva	3	6^{5}
(Sweden) R Peterson	6	7^{7}
(Slovakia) AK Schmiedlová	6	4	7^{7}
(Switzerland) S Vögele	4	6	6^{5}

Semifinals
(Sweden) R Peterson	3	4
(Slovakia) AK Schmiedlová	6	6

=== Bottom half ===
First round
5	(United States) S Kenin	6	2	5
(Switzerland) P Schnyder	2	6	7
(Croatia) A Tomljanović	6	7^{7}
(United States) D Lao	4	6^{5}
WC	(United States) V Duval	6	6
Q	(Norway) U Eikeri	2	1
(United States) D Collins	3	6	6
3/WC	(United States) N Gibbs	6	3	2
8	(United States) K Day	6	6
WC	(Ukraine) A Bondarenko	3	2
(United States) I Falconi	1	6	6
(United States) J Boserup	6	3	1
(Bulgaria) E Kostova	2	2
(United States) J Loeb	6	6
Q	(United States) A Kratzer	6	6
2	(Ukraine) K Bondarenko	4	1

Second round
(Switzerland) P Schnyder	6^{5}	0
(Croatia) A Tomljanović	7^{7}	6
WC	(United States) V Duval	7^{7}	7
(United States) D Collins	6^{4}	5
8	(United States) K Day	6	6
(United States) I Falconi	4	1
(United States) J Loeb	6	5
Q	(United States) A Kratzer	3	1^{r}

Quarterfinals
(Croatia) A Tomljanović	4	6	4
WC	(United States) V Duval	6	1	6
8	(United States) K Day	6	6
(United States) J Loeb	1	4

Semifinals
WC	(United States) V Duval	6	6
8	(United States) K Day	1	3
