= 2022 Mercer Tennis Classic =

Tennis tournament

- Date: 17–23 October 2022
- Edition: 10th
- Category: ITF Women's World Tennis Tour
- Prize money: $60,000
- Surface: Hard / Outdoor
- Location: Macon, Georgia, United States

Champions

Singles
- (United States) Madison Brengle

Doubles
- (United States) Anna Rogers / (United States) Christina Rosca
← 2021 ·	Tennis Classic of Macon	· 2023 →

The 2022 Mercer Tennis Classic was a professional tennis tournament played on outdoor hard courts. It was the tenth edition of the tournament which was part of the 2022 ITF Women's World Tennis Tour. It took place in Macon, Georgia, United States between 17 and 23 October 2022.

== Champions ==
=== Singles ===
- (United States) Madison Brengle def. (Hungary) Panna Udvardy, 6–3, 6–1

=== Doubles ===
- (United States) Anna Rogers / (United States) Christina Rosca def. (United States) Madison Brengle / (United States) Maria Mateas, 6–4, 6–4

== Singles main draw entrants ==
=== Seeds ===
Country	Player	Rank^{1}	Seed
USA	Madison Brengle	49	1
HUN	Panna Udvardy	82	2
~~SWE~~	~~Rebecca Peterson~~	~~111~~	~~3~~
USA	Katie Volynets	119	4
USA	Emma Navarro	134	5
USA	Katrina Scott	153	6
USA	Taylor Townsend	195	7
ARG	Nadia Podoroska	208	8

- ^{1} Rankings are as of 10 October 2022.

=== Other entrants ===
The following players received wildcards into the singles main draw:

- (United States) Samantha Crawford
- (United States) Riley Crowder
- (United States) Anna Rogers
- (United States) Katrina Scott

The following player received entry into the singles main draw using a protected ranking:

- (United States) Maria Mateas

The following players received entry from the qualifying draw:

- (United States) Carolyn Ansari
- (Canada) Ariana Arseneault
- (Canada) Bianca Fernandez
- (United States) Victoria Hu
- (Poland) Olivia Lincer
- (United States) Victoria Osuigwe
- (United States) Alana Smith
- (Sweden) Lisa Zaar

The following players received as lucky losers:

- (Israel) Tamara Barad Itzhaki
- (United States) Salma Ewing
- (United States) Akasha Urhobo
