= Victoria Duval =

American tennis player (born 1995)

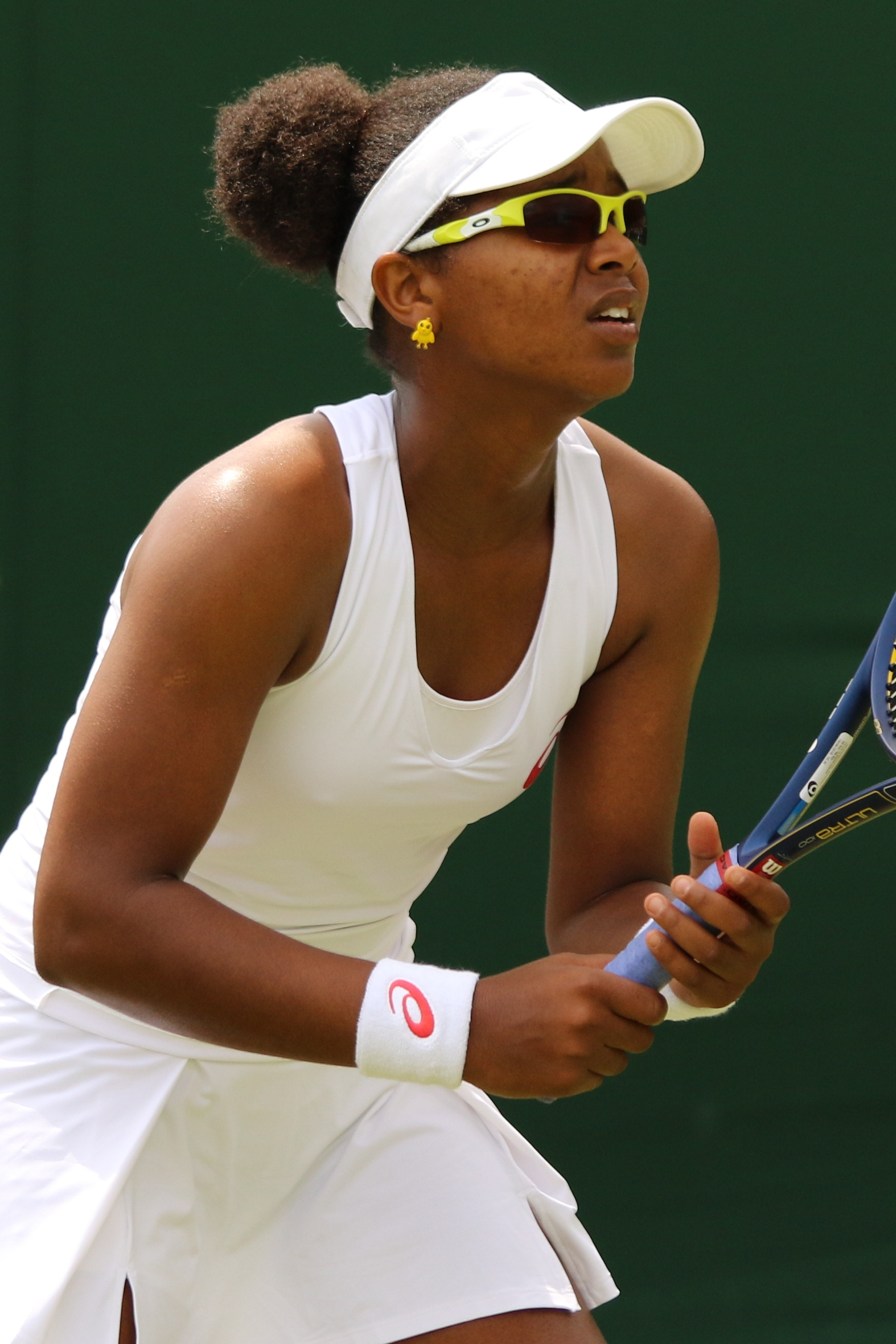
- Duval at the 2016 Wimbledon Championships
- Country (sports): United States
- Residence: Bradenton, Florida
- Born: November 30, 1995 (age 30) Miami, Florida
- Height: 5 ft 10 in (1.78 m)
- Turned pro: 2010
- Retired: 2022 (last match played)
- Plays: Right (two-handed backhand)
- Coach: Nick Bollettieri
- Prize money: $495,112

Singles
- Career record: 167–121
- Career titles: 1 ITF
- Highest ranking: No. 87 (August 4, 2014)

Grand Slam singles results
- Australian Open: 1R (2016)
- French Open: Q1 (2014)
- Wimbledon: 2R (2014)
- US Open: 2R (2013)

Doubles
- Career record: 22–17
- Career titles: 2 ITF
- Highest ranking: No. 383 (October 20, 2014)

Victoria Duval (born 30 November 1995) is a former American tennis player. In August 2014, she reached her best singles ranking of world No. 87. Duval has won one singles title and two doubles titles on the ITF Women's Circuit.

In 2012, she had won the USTA Girls' 18s National Championships.

== Early life ==
Duval was born in Miami and spent some of her childhood in Haiti, including time training at the JOTAC Tennis Academy in Port-au-Prince. While living in Port-au-Prince, Duval was robbed at gunpoint and held hostage at her aunt's house at the age of 7. Victoria's mother gave up her neonatal practice and moved Victoria and her two brothers to south Florida. Her father stayed behind to continue the gynecology and obstetrics practice he had helped build in Port-au-Prince.

To continue improving Vicky's tennis game, Nadine moved with her to Atlanta. It was here that she worked with coach Brian de Villiers, at the Racquet Club of the South. In January 2010, Vicky was training in Atlanta when a terrible earthquake struck Haiti and her father was trapped under collapsing walls outside his home for 11 hours. After he regained consciousness, he was able to dig himself out of the rubble. His legs were broken, his left arm was crushed, he had seven fractured ribs puncturing his lungs, and an infection spreading throughout his body. He survived an emergency operation in his own backyard. A wealthy Atlanta family connected to the tennis club donated enough money to have him airlifted to a Fort Lauderdale hospital.

== Junior career ==
In 2012, Duval played in the Under-18 USTA National Championships as the 17th seed. Despite the low ranking, she won the tournament by defeating Alexandra Kiick in the final. With the title, she earned a wildcard into the main draw of the US Open. Later that summer, she played in the US Open and reached the junior semifinals. In that tournament, Duval knocked out 2012 Wimbledon junior champion Eugenie Bouchard, before falling to Anett Kontaveit.

== Professional career ==
=== Early years ===
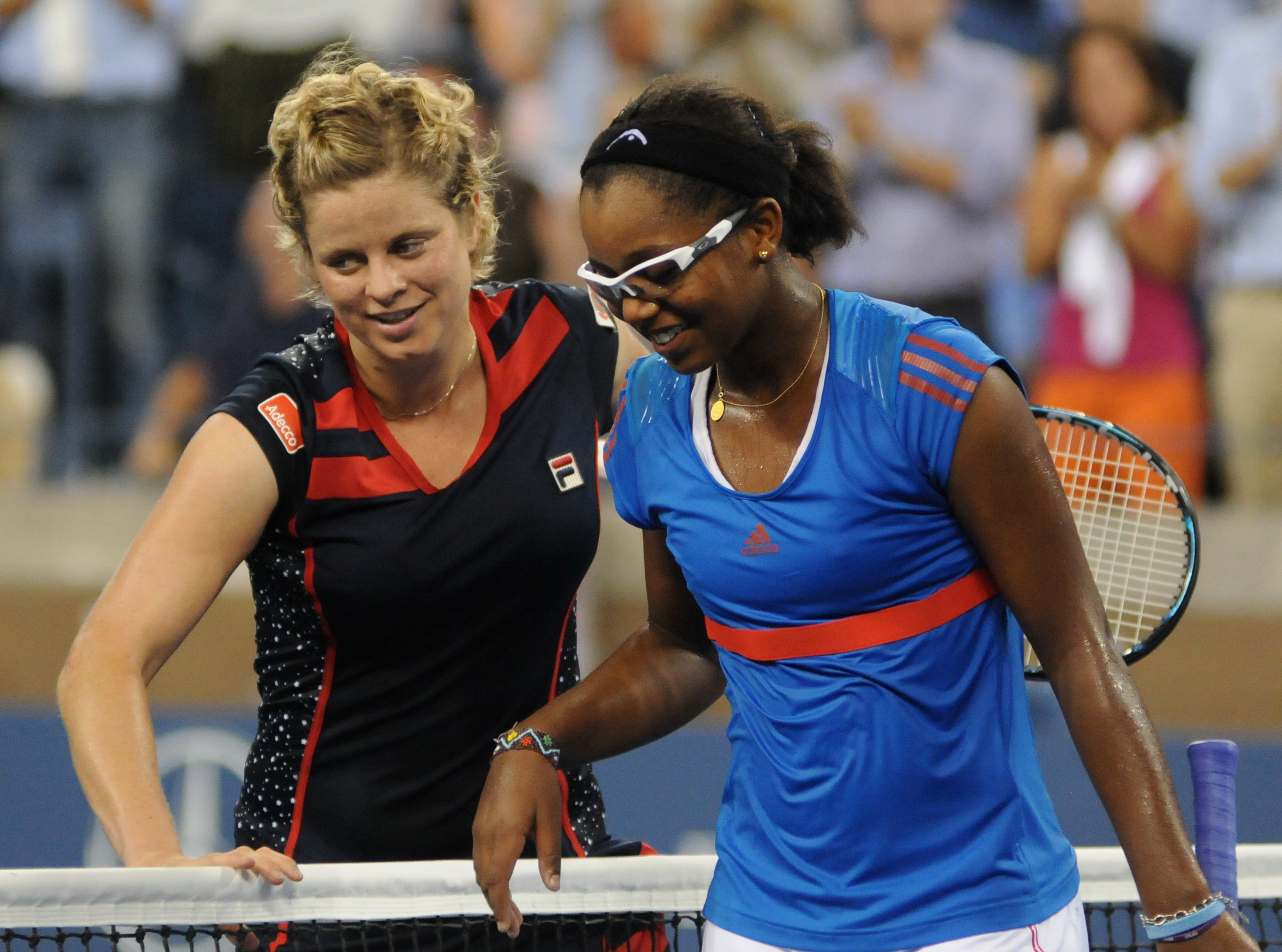
Duval with Kim Clijsters at the 2012 US Open

Duval kicked off her 2012 season in May by reaching her first professional final at the $10k tournament in Sumter, South Carolina at the age of 16, where she was defeated by compatriot Louisa Chirico. With a wildcard as the 18s girls' national champion, Duval made her Grand Slam debut at the 2012 US Open. She lost to three-time champion Kim Clijsters in the first round.

The following year, Duval qualified for the US Open and scored a huge upset win over the 2011 champion Samantha Stosur in the first round. She followed this up with her first career title at an $50k event in Toronto in November.

=== 2014—2016: Breakthrough, cancer diagnosis, knee surgery ===
During the qualifying rounds of Wimbledon in 2014, Duval was diagnosed with Hodgkin's lymphoma. Nonetheless, she decided to remain in the tournament, and was able to qualify for the main draw. In the first round, she defeated 29th seed Sorana Cîrstea, before losing to fellow rising star Belinda Bencic. With the strength of her performance at Wimbledon, Duval made her debut in the top 100 of the WTA rankings, at No. 92 in the world. Following the tournament, she proceeded to take the next 13 months off to undergo and recover from chemotherapy treatment.

Duval returned to playing professional matches at an $25k tournament in August 2015. Despite the circumstances of her comeback onto the tour, she was not awarded a wildcard into the US Open. She could have entered the tournament with her protected ranking from the previous year, but elected not to do so after being unsure if she would be ready to play at the time of the entry cutoff five weeks before the start of the event. Instead, Duval opted to play in the qualifying tournament, where she lost in the second round.

At the start of the 2016 season, Duval replaced an injured Serena Williams at the 2016 Hopman Cup. She represented the United States alongside Jack Sock. Although she lost both of her singles matches, Duval and Sock won two out of their three mixed doubles matches, including a victory over the Czech pair of Karolína Plíšková and Jiří Veselý. A month after the tournament, Duval announced she had knee surgery. She made a brief return for the grass-court season in the middle of the year, but ended up sitting out another ten months afterwards to return to full health.

=== 2017: Comeback ===
After more than two years of intermittently appearing on the tour, Duval returned to playing more regularly on the ITF Circuit starting in April 2017. She had immediate success in her first tournament back, reaching the semifinals at the $80k event in Indian Harbour Beach. Duval again entered the qualifying tournament for the US Open, but had to retire in the final round against good friend and fellow cancer survivor Allie Kiick. A few weeks after the Grand Slam tournament, she reached her first final in over three years at a $25k event. The following month, she reached the biggest final of her career at the Tennis Classic of Macon, losing to former top-30 player Anna Karolína Schmiedlová. With this result, Duval returned to the top 250 in the WTA rankings.

== Personal life ==
During the 2014 Wimbledon Championships, it was announced that Duval had been diagnosed with Hodgkin's lymphoma. Having decided to remain entered in the tournament, she qualified into the main draw and there upset 29th seed Sorana Cîrstea in a three-set encounter. She subsequently lost in the second round and would return to the United States to undergo treatment. She completed her chemotherapy and announced in September 2014 that she is cancer free.

== ITF finals ==
=== Singles: 7 (1 title, 6 runner-ups) ===
Legend $80,000 tournaments $50,000 tournaments $25,000 tournaments $10,000 tournaments	Finals by surface Hard (1–5) Clay (0–1)

Result	W–L	Date	Tournament	Tier	Surface	Opponent	Score
Loss	0–1	May 2012	ITF Sumter, United States	10,000	Hard	(United States) Louisa Chirico	4–6, 3–6
Win	1–1	Nov 2013	Toronto Challenger, Canada	50,000	Hard (i)	(Hungary) Tímea Babos	7–5, ret.
Loss	1–2	Apr 2014	Dothan Pro Classic, United States	50,000	Clay	(United States) Grace Min	3–6, 1–6
Loss	1–3	Sep 2017	ITF Lubbock, United States	25,000	Hard	(Russia) Alisa Kleybanova	0–6, 2–6
Loss	1–4	Oct 2017	Tennis Classic of Macon, United States	80,000	Hard	(Slovakia) Anna Karolína Schmiedlová	4–6, 1–6
Loss	1–5	Jun 2019	ITF Sumter, United States	25,000	Hard	(United States) Hailey Baptiste	2–6, 5–7
Loss	1–6	Jun 2022	ITF Santo Domingo, Dominican Republic	25,000	Hard	Jana Kolodynska	0–6, ret.

=== Doubles: 4 (2 titles, 2 runner-ups) ===
Legend
$50,000 tournaments (1–1)
$25,000 tournaments (1–1)

Outcome	No.	Date	Tournament	Surface	Partner	Opponents	Score
Loss	1	24 October 2011	ITF Bayamón, Puerto Rico	Hard	(United States) Allie Kiick	(South Africa) Chanel Simmonds (Croatia) Ajla Tomljanović	3–6, 1–6
Loss	2	26 October 2013	Challenger de Saguenay, Canada	Hard (i)	(Canada) Françoise Abanda	(Poland) Marta Domachowska (Czech Republic) Andrea Hlaváčková	5–7, 3–6
Winner	1	1 November 2013	Toronto Challenger, Canada	Hard (i)	(Canada) Françoise Abanda	(United States) Melanie Oudin (United States) Jessica Pegula	7–6^{(7–5)}, 2–6, [11–9]
Winner	2	22 September 2017	ITF Lubbock, United States	Hard	(Russia) Alisa Kleybanova	(India) Karman Thandi (Montenegro) Ana Veselinović	2–6, 6–4, [10–8]

== Grand Slam singles performance ==
Key
W	F	SF	QF	#R	RR	Q#	DNQ	A	NH

(W) winner; (F) finalist; (SF) semifinalist; (QF) quarterfinalist; (#R) rounds 4, 3, 2, 1; (RR) round-robin stage; (Q#) qualification round; (DNQ) did not qualify; (A) absent; (NH) not held; (SR) strike rate (events won / competed); (W–L) win–loss record.
To avoid confusion and double counting, these charts are updated at the conclusion of a tournament or when the player's participation has ended.

Tournament	2012	2013	2014	2015	2016	2017	2018	2019	2020	2021	W–L
Australian Open	A	A	Q3	A	1R	A	A	A	A	A	0–1
French Open	A	A	Q1	A	A	A	A	A	A	A	0–0
Wimbledon	A	A	2R	A	1R	A	A	A	NH	A	1–2
US Open	1R	2R	A	Q2	A	Q3	Q1	Q1	A	Q2	1–2
Win–loss	0–1	1–1	1–1	0–0	0–2	0–0	0–0	0–0	0–0	0–0	2–5
Year-end ranking	518	168	136	652	733	231	354	474	489	350	
