= 2020 Dow Tennis Classic =

- Date: 3–9 February 2020
- Edition: 26th
- Category: ITF Women's World Tennis Tour
- Prize money: $100,000
- Surface: Hard / Indoor
- Location: Midland, Michigan, United States

Champions

Singles
- (United States) Shelby Rogers

Doubles
- (United States) Caroline Dolehide / (United States) Maria Sanchez
← 2019 ·	Dow Tennis Classic	· 2021 →

The 2020 Dow Tennis Classic was a professional tennis tournament played on indoor hard courts. It was the twenty-sixth edition of the tournament which was part of the 2020 ITF Women's World Tennis Tour. It took place in Midland, Michigan, United States between 3 and 9 February 2020.

== Singles main-draw entrants ==
=== Seeds ===
Country	Player	Rank^{1}	Seed
USA	Madison Brengle	95	1
USA	Caty McNally	116	2
USA	Francesca Di Lorenzo	122	3
USA	Caroline Dolehide	141	4
BEL	Yanina Wickmayer	147	5
USA	Shelby Rogers	155	6
UKR	Anhelina Kalinina	157	7
USA	Robin Anderson	161	8

- ^{1} Rankings are as of 20 January 2020.

=== Other entrants ===
The following players received wildcards into the singles main draw:

- (United States) Elizabeth Coleman
- (United States) Kayla Day
- (United States) Irina Falconi
- (United States) Quinn Gleason

The following players received entry from the qualifying draw:

- (United States) Maria Mateas
- (United States) Alycia Parks
- (France) Marine Partaud
- (United States) Maria Sanchez
- (Georgia (country)) Sofia Shapatava
- (Romania) Gabriela Talabă
- (United States) Katie Volynets
- (China) Xu Shilin

== Champions ==
=== Singles ===
- (United States) Shelby Rogers def. (Ukraine) Anhelina Kalinina, walkover

=== Doubles ===
- (United States) Caroline Dolehide / (United States) Maria Sanchez def. (Russia) Valeria Savinykh / (Belgium) Yanina Wickmayer, 6–3, 6–4
