= 2023 Dow Tennis Classic =

- Date: 30 October–5 November 2023
- Edition: 29th
- Category: WTA 125
- Prize money: $115,000
- Surface: Hard (Indoor)
- Location: Midland, Michigan, United States
- Venue: Greater Midland Tennis Center

Champions

Singles
- Anna Kalinskaya

Doubles
- (United States) Hailey Baptiste / (United States) Whitney Osuigwe
← 2022 ·	Dow Tennis Classic	· 2024 →

The 2023 Dow Tennis Classic was a professional women's tennis tournament played on indoor hard courts. It was the twenty-ninth edition of the tournament which was also part of the 2023 WTA 125 tournaments. It took place at the Greater Midland Tennis Center in Midland, Michigan, United States between 30 October and 5 November 2023.

== Champions ==
=== Singles ===
- Anna Kalinskaya def. (Croatia) Jana Fett 7–5, 6–4

=== Doubles ===
- (United States) Hailey Baptiste / (United States) Whitney Osuigwe def. (United States) Sophie Chang / (United States) Ashley Lahey 2–6, 6–2, [10–1]

== Singles main-draw entrants ==
=== Seeds ===
Country	Player	Rank^{1}	Seed
USA	Emma Navarro	42	1
USA	Peyton Stearns	48	2
USA	Alycia Parks	54	3
USA	Taylor Townsend	66	4
USA	Ashlyn Krueger	80	5
~~USA~~	~~Kayla Day~~	~~94~~	~~6~~
USA	Emina Bektas	104	7
USA	Katie Volynets	108	8
COL	Emiliana Arango	113	9

- ^{1} Rankings are as of 23 October 2023.

=== Other entrants ===
The following players received wildcards into the singles main draw:

- (United States) Sophie Chang
- (United States) McCartney Kessler
- (United States) Emma Navarro
- (United States) Alycia Parks
- (United States) Katrina Scott
- (United States) Peyton Stearns

The following player received entry as an alternate:

- (Ukraine) Yulia Starodubtseva

The following players received entry from the qualifying draw:

- (United States) Robin Anderson
- (United States) Victoria Hu
- (United States) Varvara Lepchenko
- (Switzerland) Lulu Sun

The following players received entry as lucky losers:

- (United States) Chloe Beck
- (Andorra) Victoria Jiménez Kasintseva

=== Withdrawals ===
Before the tournament

- (United States) Hailey Baptiste → replaced by (Mexico) Renata Zarazúa
- (United States) Kayla Day → replaced by (United States) Chloe Beck
- (United States) Elizabeth Mandlik → replaced by (Ukraine) Yulia Starodubtseva
- (Germany) Tatjana Maria → replaced by (United States) Robin Anderson
- (Italy) Lucrezia Stefanini → replaced by (Cyprus) Raluca Șerban
- (United States) Sachia Vickery → (Andorra) Victoria Jiménez Kasintseva

== Doubles main-draw entrants ==
=== Seeds ===
Country	Player	Country	Player	Rank^{1}	Seed
USA	Sabrina Santamaria	GBR	Heather Watson	189	1
SUI	Conny Perrin		Iryna Shymanovich	210	2
USA	Sophie Chang	USA	Ashley Lahey	258	3
USA	Ashlyn Krueger	USA	Angela Kulikov	267	4

- ^{1} Rankings as of 23 October 2023.

=== Other entrants ===
The following pair received a wildcard into the doubles main draw:

- (United States) Chloe Beck / (United States) Elizabeth Coleman
