= 2021 Dow Tennis Classic =

Tennis tournament

- Date: 1–7 November 2021
- Edition: 27th
- Category: WTA 125
- Prize money: $115,000
- Surface: Hard (Indoor)
- Location: Midland, Michigan, United States
- Venue: Greater Midland Tennis Center

Champions

Singles
- (United States) Madison Brengle

Doubles
- (United Kingdom) Harriet Dart / (United States) Asia Muhammad
← 2020 ·	Dow Tennis Classic	· 2022 →

The 2021 Dow Tennis Classic was a professional tennis tournament played on indoor hard courts. It was the twenty-seventh edition of the tournament which was part of the 2021 WTA 125 tournaments. It took place at the Greater Midland Tennis Center in Midland, Michigan, United States between 1 and 7 November 2021.

== Singles main-draw entrants ==
=== Seeds ===
Country	Player	Rank^{1}	Seed
USA	Madison Brengle	70	1
JPN	Misaki Doi	107	2
AUS	Maddison Inglis	128	3
GBR	Harriet Dart	136	4
USA	Caty McNally	144	5
POL	Katarzyna Kawa	159	6
AUS	Lizette Cabrera	163	7
USA	Hailey Baptiste	166	8

- ^{1} Rankings are as of 25 October 2021.

=== Other entrants ===
The following players received wildcards into the singles main draw:

- (United States) Reese Brantmeier
- (United States) Elvina Kalieva
- (United States) Ashlyn Krueger
- (United States) Katrina Scott

The following players received entry using protected rankings:

- (South Korea) Han Na-lae
- (China) Lu Jiajing

The following players received entry from the qualifying draw:

- (United States) Ellie Douglas
- (United States) Alexa Glatch
- (United States) Catherine Harrison
- (United States) Dalayna Hewitt

=== Withdrawals ===
Before the tournament

- (United States) Amanda Anisimova → replaced by (United States) Robin Anderson
- (United States) Lauren Davis → replaced by (Mexico) Marcela Zacarías
- (Belarus) Olga Govortsova → replaced by (United States) Asia Muhammad
- (Greece) Valentini Grammatikopoulou → replaced by (Germany) Tatjana Maria
- (Australia) Priscilla Hon → replaced by (United States) Francesca Di Lorenzo
- (Japan) Nao Hibino → replaced by (Switzerland) Conny Perrin
- (United States) Ann Li → replaced by (United States) Whitney Osuigwe
- (United States) Claire Liu → replaced by (United States) Alycia Parks
- (United States) CoCo Vandeweghe → replaced by (South Korea) Han Na-lae

== Doubles main-draw entrants ==
=== Seeds ===
Country	Player	Country	Player	Rank^{1}	Seed
USA	Catherine Harrison	USA	Sabrina Santamaria	171	1
GBR	Harriet Dart	USA	Asia Muhammad	242	2
THA	Peangtarn Plipuech	INA	Aldila Sutjiadi	277	3
POL	Katarzyna Kawa	SUI	Conny Perrin	299	4

- Rankings are as of October 25, 2021

== Champions ==
=== Singles ===
- (United States) Madison Brengle def. (United States) Robin Anderson 6–2, 6–4

=== Doubles ===
- (United Kingdom) Harriet Dart / (United States) Asia Muhammad def. (Thailand) Peangtarn Plipuech / (Indonesia) Aldila Sutjiadi 6–3, 2–6, [10–7]
