= 2019 Dow Tennis Classic =

ITF professional tennis competition, Midland, U.S.

- Date: 28 January–3 February
- Edition: 25th
- Category: ITF Women's World Tennis Tour
- Prize money: $100,000
- Surface: Hard / Indoor
- Location: Midland, MI United States

Champions

Singles
- (United States) Caty McNally

Doubles
- (Belarus) Olga Govortsova / (Russia) Valeria Savinykh
← 2018 ·	Dow Tennis Classic	· 2020 →

The 2019 Dow Tennis Classic was a professional tennis tournament played on indoor hard courts. It was the twenty-fifth edition of the tournament and was part of the 2019 ITF Women's World Tennis Tour. It took place in Midland, United States, on 28 January–3 February 2019.

== Singles main draw entrants ==
=== Seeds ===
Country	Player	Rank^{1}	Seed
SWE	Rebecca Peterson	64	1
GER	Tatjana Maria	73	2
USA	Madison Brengle	88	3
USA	Jessica Pegula	113	4
CZE	Marie Bouzková	121	5
BEL	Yanina Wickmayer	126	6
USA	Nicole Gibbs	127	7
SUI	Jil Teichmann	148	8

- ^{1} Rankings as of 14 January 2019.

=== Other entrants ===
The following players received a wildcard into the singles main draw:

- (United States) Cori Gauff
- (United States) Ashley Kratzer
- (United States) Caty McNally
- (United States) Grace Min

The following player received entry using a protected ranking:

- (Belarus) Olga Govortsova

The following players received entry from the qualifying draw:

- (United States) Robin Anderson
- (Serbia) Jovana Jakšić
- (United States) Ann Li
- (Japan) Chihiro Muramatsu
- (Poland) Urszula Radwańska
- (Russia) Valeria Savinykh

== Champions ==
=== Singles ===
- (United States) Caty McNally def. (United States) Jessica Pegula, 6–2, 6–4

=== Doubles ===
- (Belarus) Olga Govortsova / (Russia) Valeria Savinykh def. (United States) Cori Gauff / (United States) Ann Li, 6–4, 6–0
