= 2019 Dow Tennis Classic – Doubles =

Doubles
- 2019 Dow Tennis Classic

Final
- Champions: (Belarus) Olga Govortsova (Russia) Valeria Savinykh
- Runners-up: (United States) Cori Gauff (United States) Ann Li
- Score: 6–4, 6–0

Events
Singles	Doubles
← 2018 ·	Dow Tennis Classic	· 2020 →

Kaitlyn Christian and Sabrina Santamaria were the defending champions, but both players chose not to participate.

Olga Govortsova and Valeria Savinykh won the title, defeating Cori Gauff and Ann Li in the final, 6–4, 6–0.

== Seeds ==
1. (United States) Jamie Loeb / (New Zealand) Erin Routliffe (first round)
2. (United States) Sophie Chang / (United States) Alexandra Mueller (first round)
3. (United States) Christina McHale / (Belgium) Yanina Wickmayer (semifinals)
4. (United States) Quinn Gleason / (Brazil) Luisa Stefani (first round)

== Draw ==
Key

- Q = Qualifier
- WC = Wild card
- LL = Lucky loser
- Alt = Alternate
- ITF = ITF entry
- PR = Protected ranking
- SR = Special ranking
- SE = Special exempt
- JE = Junior exempt
- JR = Junior Accelerator Programme entrant
- CO = College Accelerator Programme entrant
- NG = Next Gen Accelerator Program entrant
- w/o = Walkover
- r = Retired
- d = Defaulted

First round
1	(United States) J Loeb (New Zealand) E Routliffe	1	6^{4}
WC	(United States) C Gauff (United States) A Li	6	7^{7}
(United States) J Cako (United States) I Neel	6	6^{4}	[10]
(United States) M Brengle (United States) L Chirico	3	7^{7}	[5]
4	(United States) Q Gleason (Brazil) L Stefani	6^{6}	6^{5}
(Serbia) J Jakšić (China) Jia Lu	7^{8}	7^{7}
WC	(Brazil) C Alves (United States) E Coleman	1	4
(Czech Republic) M Bouzková (Switzerland) J Teichmann	6	6
WC	(United States) E Bektas (United States) G Min	4	1
(Canada) K Sebov (Netherlands) R van der Hoek	6	6
(United States) L Davis (United States) F Di Lorenzo	6	3	[8]
3	(United States) C McHale (Belgium) Y Wickmayer	3	6	[10]
(United States) C McNally (United States) J Pegula	6	1	[10]
(United States) M Manasse (United States) S Marand	2	6	[8]
PR	(Belarus) O Govortsova (Russia) V Savinykh	6	6
2	(United States) S Chang (United States) A Mueller	3	2

Quarterfinals
WC	(United States) C Gauff (United States) A Li	3	6	[10]
(United States) J Cako (United States) I Neel	6	3	[6]
(Serbia) J Jakšić (China) Jia Lu	0	1
(Czech Republic) M Bouzková (Switzerland) J Teichmann	6	6
(Canada) K Sebov (Netherlands) R van der Hoek	4	6	[4]
3	(United States) C McHale (Belgium) Y Wickmayer	6	4	[10]
(United States) C McNally (United States) J Pegula	2	5
PR	(Belarus) O Govortsova (Russia) V Savinykh	6	7

Semifinals
WC	(United States) C Gauff (United States) A Li	5	7	[10]
(Czech Republic) M Bouzková (Switzerland) J Teichmann	7	5	[5]
3	(United States) C McHale (Belgium) Y Wickmayer	3	2
PR	(Belarus) O Govortsova (Russia) V Savinykh	6	6

Final
WC	(United States) C Gauff (United States) A Li	4	0
PR	(Belarus) O Govortsova (Russia) V Savinykh	6	6
