= 2018 Dow Tennis Classic =

Women's professional indoor tennis tournament

- Date: 29 January–4 February
- Edition: 24th
- Category: ITF Women's Circuit
- Prize money: $100,000
- Surface: Hard / Indoor
- Location: Midland, United States

Champions

Singles
- (United States) Madison Brengle

Doubles
- (United States) Kaitlyn Christian / (United States) Sabrina Santamaria
← 2017 ·	Dow Tennis Classic	· 2019 →

The 2018 Dow Tennis Classic was a professional tennis tournament played on indoor hard courts. It was the twenty-fourth edition of the tournament and was part of the 2018 ITF Women's Circuit. It took place in Midland, United States, on 29 January–4 February 2018.

== Singles main draw entrants ==
=== Seeds ===
Country	Player	Rank^{1}	Seed
ROU	Mihaela Buzărnescu	44	1
USA	Jennifer Brady	65	2
USA	Madison Brengle	90	3
USA	Sofia Kenin	102	4
USA	Sachia Vickery	106	5
NED	Richèl Hogenkamp	108	6
COL	Mariana Duque Mariño	109	7
RUS	Evgeniya Rodina	111	8

- ^{1} Rankings as of 15 January 2018.

=== Other entrants ===
The following players received a wildcard into the singles main draw:

- (United States) Madison Brengle
- (United States) Victoria Duval
- (United States) Whitney Osuigwe
- (United States) Jessica Pegula

The following players received entry from the qualifying draw:

- (Norway) Ulrikke Eikeri
- (Serbia) Jovana Jakšić
- (United States) Ann Li
- (Canada) Katherine Sebov

The following player received entry as a Lucky Loser:

- (United States) Usue Maitane Arconada

== Champions ==
=== Singles ===
- (United States) Madison Brengle def. (United States) Jamie Loeb, 6–1, 6–2

=== Doubles ===
- (United States) Kaitlyn Christian / (United States) Sabrina Santamaria def. (United States) Jessica Pegula / (United States) Maria Sanchez, 7–5, 4–6, [10–8]
