= 2021 Dow Tennis Classic – Singles =

Singles
- 2021 Dow Tennis Classic

Final
- Champion: (United States) Madison Brengle
- Runner-up: (United States) Robin Anderson
- Score: 6–2, 6–4

Events
Singles	Doubles
← 2020 ·	Dow Tennis Classic	· 2022 →

Shelby Rogers was the defending champion, but chose not to participate.

Madison Brengle won the title, defeating Robin Anderson in the final, 6–2, 6–4.

== Seeds ==
1. (United States) Madison Brengle (champion)
2. (Japan) Misaki Doi (quarterfinals, retired)
3. (Australia) Maddison Inglis (first round)
4. (United Kingdom) Harriet Dart (first round)
5. (United States) Caty McNally (semifinals)
6. (Poland) Katarzyna Kawa (second round)
7. (Australia) Lizette Cabrera (quarterfinals)
8. (United States) Hailey Baptiste (first round)

== Draw ==
Key

- Q = Qualifier
- WC = Wild card
- LL = Lucky loser
- Alt = Alternate
- ITF = ITF entry
- PR = Protected ranking
- SR = Special ranking
- SE = Special exempt
- JE = Junior exempt
- JR = Junior Accelerator Programme entrant
- CO = College Accelerator Programme entrant
- NG = Next Gen Accelerator Program entrant
- w/o = Walkover
- r = Retired
- d = Defaulted

=== Finals ===
Semifinals
1	(United States) Madison Brengle	6^{2}	7^{10}	6
(United States) Danielle Lao	7^{7}	6^{8}	0
(United States) Robin Anderson	5	6	6
5	(United States) Caty McNally	7	3	4

Final
1	(United States) Madison Brengle	6	6
(United States) Robin Anderson	2	4

=== Top half ===
First round
1	(United States) M Brengle	4	6	6
(United States) A Muhammad	6	1	2
WC	(United States) A Krueger	4	6^{6}
(United States) S Vickery	6	7^{8}
(Japan) K Nara	7^{7}	6
(United States) H Chang	6^{2}	3
PR	(South Korea) N-l Han	6^{2}	3
7	(Australia) L Cabrera	7^{7}	6
4	(United Kingdom) H Dart	1	7	3
(Switzerland) C Perrin	6	5	6
(United States) F Di Lorenzo	6	4	6
Q	(United States) E Douglas	4	6	4
PR	(China) Jia Lu	6^{5}	5
Q	(United States) A Glatch	7^{7}	7
(United States) D Lao	3	6	6
8	(United States) H Baptiste	6	3	1

Second round
1	(United States) M Brengle	6	6
(United States) S Vickery	2	0
(Japan) K Nara	6	2	1
7	(Australia) L Cabrera	4	6	6
(Switzerland) C Perrin	1	7	3
(United States) F Di Lorenzo	6	5	6
Q	(United States) A Glatch	2	4
(United States) D Lao	6	6

Quarterfinals
1	(United States) M Brengle	6	6
7	(Australia) L Cabrera	0	0
(United States) F Di Lorenzo	6	4	2
(United States) D Lao	3	6	6

Semifinals
1	(United States) M Brengle	6^{2}	7^{10}	6
(United States) D Lao	7^{7}	6^{8}	0

=== Bottom half ===
First round
6	(Poland) K Kawa	6	6
(United States) A Parks	3	1
(Germany) T Maria	5	5
(United States) R Anderson	7	7
(Mexico) M Zacarías	4	6	3
Q	(United States) C Harrison	6	4	6
WC	(United States) K Scott	6	6
3	(Australia) M Inglis	4	4
5	(United States) C McNally	6	7
WC	(United States) R Brantmeier	3	5
WC	(United States) E Kalieva	6	1
(United States) W Osuigwe	3	0^{r}
Q	(United States) D Hewitt	6	3	6
(United States) G Min	3	6	1
(United States) K Volynets	7	1	6^{5}
2	(Japan) M Doi	5	6	7^{7}

Second round
6	(Poland) K Kawa	3	3
(United States) R Anderson	6	6
Q	(United States) C Harrison	3	1
WC	(United States) K Scott	6	6
5	(United States) C McNally	6	6
WC	(United States) E Kalieva	0	3
Q	(United States) D Hewitt	3	2
2	(Japan) M Doi	6	6

Quarterfinals
(United States) R Anderson	6	6
WC	(United States) K Scott	2	2
5	(United States) C McNally	6	4
2	(Japan) M Doi	4	2^{r}

Semifinals
(United States) R Anderson	5	6	6
5	(United States) C McNally	7	3	4

== Qualifying ==
=== Seeds ===
1. (United States) Catherine Harrison (qualified)
2. (Belgium) Marie Benoît (qualifying competition)
3. (United States) Alexa Glatch (qualified)
4. (Canada) Katherine Sebov (qualifying competition)
5. (Thailand) Peangtarn Plipuech (first round)
6. (Indonesia) Aldila Sutjiadi (qualifying competition)
7. (United States) Sophie Chang (qualifying competition)
8. (Japan) Nagi Hanatani (first round)

=== Qualifiers ===
1. (United States) Catherine Harrison
2. (United States) Dalayna Hewitt
3. (United States) Alexa Glatch
4. (United States) Ellie Douglas

=== Qualifying draw ===
==== First qualifier ====
First round
1	(United States) Catherine Harrison	6	6
(United States) Alexandra Riley	0	0
WC	(United States) Karina Miller	2	5
6	(Indonesia) Aldila Sutjiadi	6	7

Qualifying competition
1	(United States) Catherine Harrison	7^{7}	6
6	(Indonesia) Aldila Sutjiadi	6^{5}	3

==== Second qualifier ====
First round
2	(Belgium) Marie Benoît	6	6
WC	(United States) Emma Lella	3	0
(United States) Dalayna Hewitt	2	6	6
8	(Japan) Nagi Hanatani	6	2	0

Qualifying competition
2	(Belgium) Marie Benoît	2	6	4
(United States) Dalayna Hewitt	6	1	6

==== Third qualifier ====
First round
3	(United States) Alexa Glatch	6	6
(Indonesia) Beatrice Gumulya	2	1
PR	(Australia) Ivana Popovic	4	6	3
7	(United States) Sophie Chang	6	3	6

Qualifying competition
3	(United States) Alexa Glatch	6	6
7	(United States) Sophie Chang	4	1

==== Fourth qualifier ====
First round
4	(Canada) Katherine Sebov	2	7^{9}	6
(United States) Quinn Gleason	6	6^{7}	2
(United States) Ellie Douglas	6	6
5/PR	(Thailand) Peangtarn Plipuech	3	2

Qualifying competition
4	(Canada) Katherine Sebov	2	3
(United States) Ellie Douglas	6	6
