= 2026 Dow Tennis Classic =

- Date: 16–22 February
- Edition: 31st
- Category: WTA 125
- Prize money: $115,000
- Surface: Hard (Indoor)
- Location: Midland, Michigan, United States
- Venue: Greater Midland Tennis Center

Champions

Singles
- Alina Charaeva

Doubles
- (United States) Sabrina Santamaria / (China) Tang Qianhui
- Dow Tennis Classic

The 2026 Dow Tennis Classic was a professional women's tennis tournament played on indoor hard courts. It was the thirty-first and last edition of the tournament and part of the 2026 WTA 125 tournaments. It returned to the circuit after one year's absence and took place at the Greater Midland Tennis Center in Midland, Michigan, United States between 16 and 22 February.

== Singles main-draw entrants ==
=== Seeds ===
| Country | Player | Rank¹ | Seed |
|---|---|---|---|
| USA | Ashlyn Krueger | 101 | 1 |
| CZE | Darja Vidmanova | 137 | 2 |
| USA | Elvina Kalieva | 152 | 3 |
| USA | Whitney Osuigwe | 160 | 4 |
| | Alina Charaeva | 164 | 5 |
| USA | Elizabeth Mandlik | 171 | 6 |
| USA | Louisa Chirico | 172 | 7 |
| USA | Mary Stoiana | 185 | 8 |

- ^{1} Rankings are as of 9 February 2026.

=== Other entrants ===
The following players received wildcards into the singles main draw:

- (United States) Elizabeth Coleman
- (United States) Anna Frey
- (United States) Elisabeth Jones
- (Japan) Kanon Sawashiro

The following player received entry using a protected ranking:

- (United States) Madison Brengle

The following players received entry from the qualifying draw:

- (United States) Dalayna Hewitt
- (Japan) Sakura Hosogi
- (United States) Lea Ma
- (China) Xu Shilin

=== Withdrawals ===
Before the tournament

- (Canada) Bianca Andreescu → replaced by (Bulgaria) Lia Karatantcheva
- (United States) Caroline Dolehide → replaced by (United States) Hanna Chang
- (United Kingdom) Francesca Jones → replaced by (United States) Anna Rogers
- (United States) Caty McNally → replaced by (United States) Carolyn Ansari
- (Italy) Jessica Pieri → replaced by (Romania) Gabriela Lee
- (Japan) Himeno Sakatsume → replaced by (China) You Xiaodi
- (Mexico) Ana Sofía Sánchez → replaced by (Serbia) Katarina Jokić

== Doubles main-draw entrants ==
=== Seeds ===
| Country | Player | Country | Player | Rank^{1} | Seed |
|---|---|---|---|---|---|
| USA | Sabrina Santamaria | CHN | Tang Qianhui | 142 | 1 |
| NED | Isabelle Haverlag | GBR | Maia Lumsden | 160 | 2 |
| USA | Quinn Gleason | USA | Dalayna Hewitt | 223 | 3 |
| CAN | Kayla Cross | USA | Anna Rogers | 278 | 4 |

- ^{1} Rankings as of 26 January 2026.

=== Other entrants ===
The following team received a wildcard into the doubles main draw:

- (United States) Elizabeth Coleman / (United States) Carson Tanguilig

=== Withdrawal ===
During the tournament

- (Venezuela) Sofia Cabezas Domínguez / (United States) Sara Daavettila (left leg injury)

== Champions ==
=== Singles ===
- Alina Charaeva def. (China) Guo Hanyu 6–4, 7–6^{(7–4)}

=== Doubles ===
- (United States) Sabrina Santamaria / (China) Tang Qianhui def. (United States) Alana Smith / (United States) Mary Stoiana walkover
