= 2024 Dow Tennis Classic =

- Date: 4–10 November 2024
- Edition: 30th
- Category: WTA 125
- Prize money: $115,000
- Surface: Hard (Indoor)
- Location: Midland, Michigan, United States
- Venue: Greater Midland Tennis Center

Champions

Singles
- (Canada) Rebecca Marino

Doubles
- (United Kingdom) Emily Appleton / (United Kingdom) Maia Lumsden
- Dow Tennis Classic

The 2024 Dow Tennis Classic was a professional women's tennis tournament played on indoor hard courts. It was the thirtieth edition of the tournament and part of the 2024 WTA 125 tournaments. It took place at the Greater Midland Tennis Center in Midland, Michigan, United States between 4 and 10 November 2024.

== Champions ==
=== Singles ===
- (Canada) Rebecca Marino def. (United States) Alycia Parks 6–2, 6–1

=== Doubles ===
- (United Kingdom) Emily Appleton / (United Kingdom) Maia Lumsden def. (Canada) Ariana Arseneault / (Canada) Mia Kupres 6–2, 4–6, [10–5]

== Singles main-draw entrants ==
=== Seeds ===
| Country | Player | Rank¹ | Seed |
|---|---|---|---|
| ~~MEX~~ | ~~Renata Zarazúa~~ | ~~62~~ | ~~1~~ |
| GER | Tatjana Maria | 98 | 2 |
| USA | Alycia Parks | 109 | 3 |
| AUS | Maya Joint | 110 | 4 |
| USA | Ann Li | 111 | 5 |
| CAN | Rebecca Marino | 114 | 6 |
| CAN | Marina Stakusic | 116 | 7 |
| UKR | Lesia Tsurenko | 122 | 8 |
| | Polina Kudermetova | 133 | 9 |

- ^{1} Rankings are as of 28 October 2024.

=== Other entrants ===
The following players received wildcards into the singles main draw:

- (United States) Lauren Davis
- (United States) Caty McNally
- (United States) Karina Miller
- (United States) Katrina Scott

The following player received entry using a protected ranking:

- Alina Korneeva

The following players received entry from the qualifying draw:

- (United States) Robin Anderson
- (United Kingdom) Emily Appleton
- (Japan) Haruka Kaji
- (United States) Whitney Osuigwe

The following players received entry as lucky losers:

- (Switzerland) Leonie Küng
- (United States) Jamie Loeb

== Doubles main-draw entrants ==
=== Seeds ===
| Country | Player | Country | Player | Rank^{1} | Seed |
|---|---|---|---|---|---|
| POL | Katarzyna Kawa | USA | Sabrina Santamaria | 174 | 1 |
| GBR | Emily Appleton | GBR | Maia Lumsden | 178 | 2 |
| USA | Hailey Baptiste | USA | Whitney Osuigwe | 213 | 3 |
| USA | Carmen Corley | USA | Quinn Gleason | 223 | 4 |

- ^{1} Rankings as of 28 October 2024.

=== Other entrants ===
The following pair received a wildcard into the doubles main draw:

- (United States) Elizabeth Coleman / (United States) Karina Miller
