= 2022 Dow Tennis Classic =

- Date: 31 October–6 November 2022
- Edition: 28th
- Category: WTA 125
- Prize money: $115,000
- Surface: Hard (Indoor)
- Location: Midland, Michigan, United States
- Venue: Greater Midland Tennis Center

Champions

Singles
- (United States) Caty McNally

Doubles
- (United States) Asia Muhammad / (United States) Alycia Parks
← 2021 ·	Dow Tennis Classic	· 2023 →

The 2022 Dow Tennis Classic was a professional tennis tournament played on indoor hard courts. It was the twenty-eighth edition of the tournament which was also part of the 2022 WTA 125 tournaments. It took place at the Greater Midland Tennis Center in Midland, Michigan, United States between 31 October and 6 November 2022.

== Champions ==
=== Singles ===
- (United States) Caty McNally def. (Germany) Anna-Lena Friedsam, 6–3, 6–2.

=== Doubles ===
- (United States) Asia Muhammad / (United States) Alycia Parks def. (Germany) Anna-Lena Friedsam / (Ukraine) Nadiia Kichenok, 6–2, 6–3

== Singles main-draw entrants ==
=== Seeds ===
Country	Player	Rank^{1}	Seed
CHN	Zhang Shuai	24	1
USA	Madison Brengle	51	2
CHN	Zhu Lin	62	3
~~CHN~~	~~Yuan Yue~~	~~83~~	~~4~~
COL	Camila Osorio	86	5
	Varvara Gracheva	94	6
USA	Caty McNally	108	7
JPN	Moyuka Uchijima	109	8

- ^{1} Rankings are as of 24 October 2022.

=== Other entrants ===
The following players received wildcards into the singles main draw:

- (Canada) Eugenie Bouchard
- (United States) Madison Brengle
- (United States) Sofia Kenin
- (United States) Maria Mateas
- (United States) Peyton Stearns
- (China) Zhang Shuai

The following players received entry from the qualifying draw:

- (United States) Kayla Day
- (United States) Elvina Kalieva
- (United States) Robin Montgomery
- (Canada) Katherine Sebov

The following player received entry as a lucky loser:

- (United States) Sophie Chang

=== Withdrawals ===
Before the tournament

- (Mexico) Fernanda Contreras Gómez → replaced by (United States) Sachia Vickery
- Anna Kalinskaya → replaced by (Canada) Carol Zhao
- (Ukraine) Marta Kostyuk → replaced by (United States) Robin Anderson
- (Sweden) Rebecca Peterson → replaced by (Germany) Anna-Lena Friedsam
- (Ukraine) Lesia Tsurenko → replaced by (United States) Asia Muhammad
- (Croatia) Donna Vekić → replaced by (United States) Louisa Chirico
- (United States) Katie Volynets → replaced by (United States) Ashlyn Krueger
- (China) Yuan Yue → replaced by (United States) Sophie Chang

== Doubles entrants ==
=== Seeds ===
Country	Player	Country	Player	Rank^{1}	Seed
USA	Asia Muhammad	USA	Alycia Parks	105	1
USA	Sophie Chang	USA	Angela Kulikov	118	2
USA	Kaitlyn Christian		Lidziya Marozava	129	3
USA	Catherine Harrison	USA	Sabrina Santamaria	167	4

- ^{1} Rankings as of 24 October 2022.

=== Other entrants ===
The following pair received a wildcard into the doubles main draw:

- (Czech Republic) Karolína Beránková / (United States) Elizabeth Coleman
