= 2020 Dow Tennis Classic – Singles =

Singles
- 2020 Dow Tennis Classic

Final
- Champion: (United States) Shelby Rogers
- Runner-up: (Ukraine) Anhelina Kalinina
- Score: walkover

Events
| Singles | Doubles |
| ← 2019 · | Dow Tennis Classic | · 2021 → |

Caty McNally was the defending champion, but lost in the quarterfinals to Anhelina Kalinina.

Shelby Rogers won the title after Kalinina withdrew from final because of leg injury.

== Seeds ==
1. (United States) Madison Brengle (first round)
2. (United States) Caty McNally (quarterfinals)
3. (United States) Francesca Di Lorenzo (second round)
4. (United States) Caroline Dolehide (second round)
5. (Belgium) Yanina Wickmayer (quarterfinals)
6. (United States) Shelby Rogers (champion)
7. (Ukraine) Anhelina Kalinina (final, withdrew)
8. (United States) Robin Anderson (second round)

== Draw ==
Key

- Q = Qualifier
- WC = Wild card
- LL = Lucky loser
- Alt = Alternate
- ITF = ITF entry
- PR = Protected ranking
- SR = Special ranking
- SE = Special exempt
- JE = Junior exempt
- JR = Junior Accelerator Programme entrant
- CO = College Accelerator Programme entrant
- NG = Next Gen Accelerator Program entrant
- w/o = Walkover
- r = Retired
- d = Defaulted

=== Finals ===
Semifinals
6 | (United States) Shelby Rogers | 7 | 7^{7}
WC | (United States) Irina Falconi | 5 | 6^{4}
(United States) Jamie Loeb | 0 | 1
7 | (Ukraine) Anhelina Kalinina | 6 | 6

Final
6 | (United States) Shelby Rogers | w/o
7 | (Ukraine) Anhelina Kalinina

=== Top half ===
First round
1 | (United States) M Brengle | 2 | 6^{4}
Q | (Romania) G Talabă | 6 | 7^{7}
Q | (China) S Xu | 6 | 6
WC | (United States) Q Gleason | 0 | 3
Q | (France) M Partaud | 6 | 6
Q | (United States) M Sanchez | 4 | 2
WC | (United States) K Day | 3 | 2
6 | (United States) S Rogers | 6 | 6
4 | (United States) C Dolehide | 6 | 6
(United States) G Min | 1 | 4
WC | (United States) I Falconi | 3 | 6 | 6
(Japan) M Hibi | 6 | 2 | 1
Q | (Georgia (country)) S Shapatava | 5 | 3
(Australia) S Mendez | 7 | 6
WC | (United States) E Coleman | 3 | 2
5 | (Belgium) Y Wickmayer | 6 | 6

Second round
Q | (Romania) G Talabă | 7 | 6
Q | (China) S Xu | 5 | 2
Q | (France) M Partaud | 4 | 1
6 | (United States) S Rogers | 6 | 6
4 | (United States) C Dolehide | 6 | 1 | 1
WC | (United States) I Falconi | 1 | 6 | 6
(Australia) S Mendez | 0 | 4
5 | (Belgium) Y Wickmayer | 6 | 6

Quarterfinals
Q | (Romania) G Talabă | 4 | 4
6 | (United States) S Rogers | 6 | 6
WC | (United States) I Falconi | 3 | 6 | 6
5 | (Belgium) Y Wickmayer | 6 | 1 | 4

Semifinals
6 | (United States) S Rogers | 7 | 7^{7}
WC | (United States) I Falconi | 5 | 6^{4}

=== Bottom half ===
First round
8 | (United States) R Anderson | 4 | 6 | 6
(Serbia) J Jović | 6 | 3 | 4
(United States) J Loeb | 7 | 4 | 6
(Germany) M Barthel | 5 | 6 | 4
(Italy) S Errani | 4 | 3
(United States) C Harrison | 6 | 6
(Mexico) M Zacarías | 2 | 3
3 | (United States) F Di Lorenzo | 6 | 6
7 | (Ukraine) A Kalinina | 2 | 6 | 6
(Russia) V Savinykh | 6 | 3 | 2
Q | (United States) M Mateas | 6 | 7^{7}
Q | (United States) A Parks | 4 | 6^{3}
(France) J Ponchet | 6 | 6
Q | (United States) K Volynets | 2 | 2
(United States) A Glatch | 2 | 1
2 | (United States) C McNally | 6 | 6

Second round
8 | (United States) R Anderson | 3 | 6 | 2
(United States) J Loeb | 6 | 4 | 6
(United States) C Harrison | 6 | 6
3 | (United States) F Di Lorenzo | 3 | 0
7 | (Ukraine) A Kalinina | 6 | 6
Q | (United States) M Mateas | 3 | 2
(France) J Ponchet | 7 | 1 | 1
2 | (United States) C McNally | 5 | 6 | 6

Quarterfinals
(United States) J Loeb | 6 | 6
(United States) C Harrison | 4 | 3
7 | (Ukraine) A Kalinina | 2 | 6 | 6
2 | (United States) C McNally | 6 | 3 | 4

Semifinals
(United States) J Loeb | 0 | 1
7 | (Ukraine) A Kalinina | 6 | 6
