= 2023 Dow Tennis Classic – Singles =

Singles
- 2023 Dow Tennis Classic

Final
- Champion: Anna Kalinskaya
- Runner-up: (Croatia) Jana Fett
- Score: 7–5, 6–4

Events
Singles	Doubles
← 2022 ·	Dow Tennis Classic	· 2024 →

Anna Kalinskaya won the title, defeating Jana Fett in the final, 7–5, 6–4. It was her maiden WTA 125 title, and she saved three match points en route, in the quarterfinals against Hailey Baptiste.

Caty McNally was the defending champion, but did not participate this year.

== Seeds ==
1. (United States) Emma Navarro (semifinals)
2. (United States) Peyton Stearns (second round)
3. (United States) Alycia Parks (semifinals)
4. (United States) Taylor Townsend (quarterfinals, withdrew)
5. (United States) Ashlyn Krueger (second round)
6. (United States) Kayla Day (withdrew)
7. (United States) Emina Bektas (quarterfinals)
8. (United States) Katie Volynets (first round)
9. (Colombia) Emiliana Arango (first round)

== Draw ==
Key

- Q = Qualifier
- WC = Wild card
- LL = Lucky loser
- Alt = Alternate
- ITF = ITF entry
- PR = Protected ranking
- SR = Special ranking
- SE = Special exempt
- JE = Junior exempt
- JR = Junior Accelerator Programme entrant
- CO = College Accelerator Programme entrant
- NG = Next Gen Accelerator Program entrant
- w/o = Walkover
- r = Retired
- d = Defaulted

=== Finals ===
Semifinals
1/WC	(United States) Emma Navarro	6	1	4
(Croatia) Jana Fett	3	6	6
3/WC	(United States) Alycia Parks	6	6^{3}	3
Anna Kalinskaya	3	7^{7}	6

Final
(Croatia) Jana Fett	5	4
Anna Kalinskaya	7	6

=== Top half ===
First round
1/WC	(United States) E Navarro	6	6
LL	(United States) C Beck	2	3
Q	(United States) R Anderson	6	6
(United States) E Kalieva	2	2
WC	(United States) K Scott	7^{10}	4	6
(Mexico) R Zarazúa	6^{8}	6	2
WC	(United States) M Kessler	6	4	5
7	(United States) E Bektas	2	6	7
4	(United States) T Townsend	1	6	6
(Cyprus) R Șerban	6	3	2
WC	(United States) S Chang	6	1	0
Alt	(Ukraine) Y Starodubtseva	3	6	6
(Netherlands) A Hartono	5	0
(Croatia) J Fett	7	6
(Canada) R Marino	6	6^{9}	7
9	(Colombia) E Arango	3	7^{11}	5

Second round
1/WC	(United States) E Navarro	6	6
Q	(United States) R Anderson	2	1
WC	(United States) K Scott	6^{7}	2
7	(United States) E Bektas	7^{9}	6
4	(United States) T Townsend	6	3	6
Alt	(Ukraine) Y Starodubtseva	1	6	2
(Croatia) J Fett	5	6	6
(Canada) R Marino	7	3	2

Quarterfinals
1/WC	(United States) E Navarro	6	6
7	(United States) E Bektas	2	3
4	(United States) T Townsend
(Croatia) J Fett	w/o

Semifinals
1/WC	(United States) E Navarro	6	1	4
(Croatia) J Fett	3	6	6

=== Bottom half ===
First round
5	(United States) A Krueger	6	1
Q	(United States) V Lepchenko	1	0^{r}
(Canada) K Sebov	6	3	7
Q	(Switzerland) L Sun	3	6	5
I Shymanovich	4	0^{r}
(France) C Monnet	6	0
(United States) A Li	2	1
3/WC	(United States) A Parks	6	6
8	(United States) K Volynets	6	4	2
T Prozorova	4	6	6
A Kalinskaya	6	6
(United Kingdom) H Watson	4	4
Q	(United States) V Hu	5	5
(United States) H Baptiste	7	7
LL	(Andorra) V Jiménez Kasintseva	0	0
2/WC	(United States) P Stearns	6	6

Second round
5	(United States) A Krueger	4	0
(Canada) K Sebov	6	6
(France) C Monnet	3	2
3/WC	(United States) A Parks	6	6
T Prozorova	3	5
A Kalinskaya	6	7
(United States) H Baptiste	6	6^{4}	6
2/WC	(United States) P Stearns	2	7^{7}	2

Quarterfinals
(Canada) K Sebov	5	1
3/WC	(United States) A Parks	7	6
A Kalinskaya	7^{7}	4	7^{7}
(United States) H Baptiste	6^{4}	6	6^{5}

Semifinals
3/WC	(United States) A Parks	6	6^{3}	3
A Kalinskaya	3	7^{7}	6

== Qualifying ==
=== Seeds ===
1. (Ukraine) Yulia Starodubtseva (moved to main draw)
2. Jana Kolodynska (qualifying competition)
3. (Switzerland) Lulu Sun (qualified)
4. (Andorra) Victoria Jiménez Kasintseva (qualifying competition, lucky loser)
5. (United States) Louisa Chirico (qualifying competition)
6. (United States) Grace Min (first round)
7. (United States) Ashley Lahey (first round)
8. (United States) Robin Anderson (qualified)

=== Qualifiers ===
1. (United States) Robin Anderson
2. (United States) Varvara Lepchenko
3. (Switzerland) Lulu Sun
4. (United States) Victoria Hu

=== Lucky losers ===
1. (United States) Chloe Beck
2. (Andorra) Victoria Jiménez Kasintseva

=== Qualifying draw ===
==== First qualifier ====
First round
Alt	(United States) Tori Kinard	6^{5}	5
WC	(United States) Chloe Beck	7^{7}	7
(United States) Dalayna Hewitt	6^{7}	6	5
8	(United States) Robin Anderson	7^{9}	4	7

Qualifying competition
WC	(United States) Chloe Beck	4	1
8	(United States) Robin Anderson	6	6

==== Second qualifier ====
First round
2	Jana Kolodynska	6	3	6
(United States) Catherine Harrison	2	6	4
(United States) Varvara Lepchenko	6	6
6	(United States) Grace Min	2	3

Qualifying competition
2	Jana Kolodynska	7^{7}	3	3
(United States) Varvara Lepchenko	6^{2}	6	6

==== Third qualifier ====
First round
3	(Switzerland) Lulu Sun	6	6
(Switzerland) Conny Perrin	2	1
(United States) Whitney Osuigwe	6^{8}	6	3
5	(United States) Louisa Chirico	7^{10}	2	6

Qualifying competition
3	(Switzerland) Lulu Sun	6	6
5	(United States) Louisa Chirico	1	1

==== Fourth qualifier ====
First round
4	(Andorra) Victoria Jiménez Kasintseva	6	0	6
WC	(United States) Elizabeth Coleman	2	6	3
(United States) Victoria Hu	6	6
7	(United States) Ashley Lahey	3	4

Qualifying competition
4	(Andorra) Victoria Jiménez Kasintseva	7^{8}	4	4
(United States) Victoria Hu	6^{6}	6	6
