= 2022 Dow Tennis Classic – Singles =

Singles
- 2022 Dow Tennis Classic

Final
- Champion: (United States) Caty McNally
- Runner-up: (Germany) Anna-Lena Friedsam
- Score: 6–3, 6–2

Events
Singles	Doubles
← 2021 ·	Dow Tennis Classic	· 2023 →

Madison Brengle was the defending champion, but lost in the second round to Sofia Kenin.

Caty McNally won the title, defeating Anna-Lena Friedsam in the final, 6–3, 6–2.

== Seeds ==
1. (China) Zhang Shuai (first round)
2. (United States) Madison Brengle (second round)
3. (China) Zhu Lin (second round)
4. (China) Yuan Yue (withdrew)
5. (Colombia) Camila Osorio (quarterfinals)
6. Varvara Gracheva (first round)
7. (United States) Caty McNally (champion)
8. (Japan) Moyuka Uchijima (first round)

== Draw ==
Key

- Q = Qualifier
- WC = Wild card
- LL = Lucky loser
- Alt = Alternate
- ITF = ITF entry
- PR = Protected ranking
- SR = Special ranking
- SE = Special exempt
- JE = Junior exempt
- JR = Junior Accelerator Programme entrant
- CO = College Accelerator Programme entrant
- NG = Next Gen Accelerator Program entrant
- w/o = Walkover
- r = Retired
- d = Defaulted

=== Finals ===
Semifinals
(United States) Ann Li	4	2
(Germany) Anna-Lena Friedsam	6	6
WC	(United States) Peyton Stearns	1	2
7	(United States) Caty McNally	6	6

Final
(Germany) Anna-Lena Friedsam	3	2
7	(United States) Caty McNally	6	6

=== Top half ===
First round
1/WC	(China) S Zhang	4	7^{7}	3
(Japan) N Hibino	6	6^{4}	6
(United States) K Scott	6	6^{3}	5
(United States) R Anderson	4	7^{7}	7
(United States) C Vandeweghe	6	5	4
(Poland) M Fręch	4	7	6
(United States) A Li	4	7^{7}	6
6	V Gracheva	6	6^{5}	3
LL	(United States) S Chang	4	6^{7}
(Germany) A-L Friedsam	6	7^{9}
Q	(United States) E Kalieva	7	3	3
(United States) S Vickery	5	6	6
(United States) E Mandlik	6	7
(Romania) G Lee	4	5
WC	(Canada) E Bouchard	6	2	2
5	(Colombia) C Osorio	1	6	6

Second round
(Japan) N Hibino	7^{7}	6
(United States) R Anderson	6^{2}	3
(Poland) M Fręch	7	2	6^{5}
(United States) A Li	5	6	7^{7}
(Germany) A-L Friedsam	6	6
(United States) S Vickery	2	3
(United States) E Mandlik	1	5
5	(Colombia) C Osorio	6	7

Quarterfinals
(Japan) N Hibino	6	2	5
(United States) A Li	2	6	7
(Germany) A-L Friedsam	6	6
5	(Colombia) C Osorio	3	3

Semifinals
(United States) A Li	4	2
(Germany) A-L Friedsam	6	6

=== Bottom half ===
First round
8	(Japan) M Uchijima	1	6^{11}
(United States) A Krueger	6	7^{13}
(United States) A Muhammad	3	4
WC	(United States) P Stearns	6	6
Q	(United States) R Montgomery	6^{6}	7	3
Q	(Canada) K Sebov	7^{8}	5	6
(United States) L Chirico	4	4
3	(China) L Zhu	6	6
7	(United States) C McNally	6	6
(United States) A Parks	3	1
(South Korea) S-j Jang	6	3	6
Q	(United States) K Day	3	6	3
WC	(United States) S Kenin	7	6
WC	(United States) M Mateas	5	2
(Canada) C Zhao	4	1
2/WC	(United States) M Brengle	6	6

Second round
(United States) A Krueger	2	3
WC	(United States) P Stearns	6	6
Q	(Canada) K Sebov	6	6
3	(China) L Zhu	4	3
7	(United States) C McNally	6	6
(South Korea) S-j Jang	3	2
WC	(United States) S Kenin	6	6
2/WC	(United States) M Brengle	1	3

Quarterfinals
WC	(United States) P Stearns	6	6
Q	(Canada) K Sebov	4	2
7	(United States) C McNally	6	0	6
WC	(United States) S Kenin	3	6	4

Semifinals
WC	(United States) P Stearns	1	2
7	(United States) C McNally	6	6

== Qualifying ==
=== Seeds ===
1. (United States) Kayla Day (qualified)
2. Diana Shnaider (qualifying competition)
3. (United States) Elvina Kalieva (qualified)
4. (United States) Sophie Chang (qualifying competition, lucky loser)
5. (Canada) Katherine Sebov (qualified)
6. (United States) Jamie Loeb (qualifying competition)
7. (United States) Francesca Di Lorenzo (qualifying competition)
8. (United States) Robin Montgomery (qualified)

=== Qualifiers ===
1. (United States) Kayla Day
2. (United States) Robin Montgomery
3. (United States) Elvina Kalieva
4. (Canada) Katherine Sebov

=== Lucky loser ===
1. (United States) Sophie Chang

=== Qualifying draw ===
==== First qualifier ====
First round
1	(United States) Kayla Day	6^{2}	7	6
(United States) Emina Bektas	7^{7}	5	3
(United States) Whitney Osuigwe	2	4
7	(United States) Francesca Di Lorenzo	6	6

Qualifying competition
1	(United States) Kayla Day	6	6
7	(United States) Francesca Di Lorenzo	3	3

==== Second qualifier ====
First round
2	Diana Shnaider	6	6
(United States) Catherine Harrison	4	2
(Czech Republic) Michaela Bayerlová	2	1
8	(United States) Robin Montgomery	6	6

Qualifying competition
2	Diana Shnaider	3	2
8	(United States) Robin Montgomery	6	6

==== Third qualifier ====
First round
3	(United States) Elvina Kalieva	6	6
(Romania) Elena-Teodora Cadar	0	4
WC	(United States) Elizabeth Coleman	5	5
6	(United States) Jamie Loeb	7	7

Qualifying competition
3	(United States) Elvina Kalieva	3	7^{12}	7^{7}
6	(United States) Jamie Loeb	6	6^{10}	6^{3}

==== Fourth qualifier ====
First round
4	(United States) Sophie Chang	6	6
WC	(United States) Eleana Yu	2	4
(United States) Hanna Chang	6	3	1
5	(Canada) Katherine Sebov	4	6	6

Qualifying competition
4	(United States) Sophie Chang	1	6^{5}
5	(Canada) Katherine Sebov	6	7^{7}
