= 2021 Dow Tennis Classic – Doubles =

Doubles
- 2021 Dow Tennis Classic

Final
- Champions: (United Kingdom) Harriet Dart (United States) Asia Muhammad
- Runners-up: (Thailand) Peangtarn Plipuech (Indonesia) Aldila Sutjiadi
- Score: 6–3, 2–6, [10–7]

Events
Singles	Doubles
← 2020 ·	Dow Tennis Classic	· 2022 →

Caroline Dolehide and Maria Sanchez were the defending champions but chose not to participate.

Harriet Dart and Asia Muhammad won the title, defeating Peangtarn Plipuech and Aldila Sutjiadi in the final, 6–3, 2–6, [10–7].

== Seeds ==
1. (United States) Catherine Harrison / (United States) Sabrina Santamaria (semifinals)
2. (United Kingdom) Harriet Dart / (United States) Asia Muhammad (champions)
3. (Thailand) Peangtarn Plipuech / (Indonesia) Aldila Sutjiadi (final)
4. (Poland) Katarzyna Kawa / (Switzerland) Conny Perrin (semifinals, retired)

== Draw ==
Key

- Q = Qualifier
- WC = Wild card
- LL = Lucky loser
- Alt = Alternate
- ITF = ITF entry
- PR = Protected ranking
- SR = Special ranking
- SE = Special exempt
- JE = Junior exempt
- JR = Junior Accelerator Programme entrant
- CO = College Accelerator Programme entrant
- NG = Next Gen Accelerator Program entrant
- w/o = Walkover
- r = Retired
- d = Defaulted

=== Draw ===
First round
(South Korea) J-h Choi (South Korea) N-l Han	w/o
(United States) H Baptiste (United States) W Osuigwe
3	(Thailand) P Plipuech (Indonesia) A Sutjiadi	6	3	[10]
(United States) S Chang (United States) A Kulikov	4	6	[8]
(United States) Q Gleason (Chinese Taipei) Y-c Hsieh	4	4
(United States) R Anderson (Mexico) M Zacarías	6	6
(United States) H Chang (United States) A Glatch	6	4	[8]
(United States) R Brantmeier (United States) E Kalieva	3	6	[10]
(United States) A Krueger (United States) A Parks	2	6^{3}
4	(Poland) K Kawa (Switzerland) C Perrin	6	7^{7}
(Belgium) M Benoît (China) Jia Lu	6	3	[10]
(Indonesia) B Gumulya (Indonesia) J Rompies	4	6	[7]

Quarterfinals
1	(United States) C Harrison (United States) S Santamaria	6	6
(South Korea) J-h Choi (South Korea) N-l Han	2	1
3	(Thailand) P Plipuech (Indonesia) A Sutjiadi	6	6
(United States) R Anderson (Mexico) M Zacarías	3	2
(United States) R Brantmeier (United States) E Kalieva	6^{5}	3
4	(Poland) K Kawa (Switzerland) C Perrin	7^{7}	6
(Belgium) M Benoît (China) Jia Lu	6^{2}	6^{4}
2	(United Kingdom) H Dart (United States) A Muhammad	7^{7}	7^{7}

Semifinals
1	(United States) C Harrison (United States) S Santamaria	3	4
3	(Thailand) P Plipuech (Indonesia) A Sutjiadi	6	6
4	(Poland) K Kawa (Switzerland) C Perrin	0	0^{r}
2	(United Kingdom) H Dart (United States) A Muhammad	6	4

Final
3	(Thailand) P Plipuech (Indonesia) A Sutjiadi	3	6	[7]
2	(United Kingdom) H Dart (United States) A Muhammad	6	2	[10]
