= 2026 Dow Tennis Classic – Doubles =

Doubles
- 2026 Dow Tennis Classic

Final
- Champions: (United States) Sabrina Santamaria (China) Tang Qianhui
- Runners-up: (United States) Alana Smith (United States) Mary Stoiana
- Score: Walkover

Events
Singles	Doubles
- Dow Tennis Classic

Sabrina Santamaria and Tang Qianhui won the title, after Alana Smith and Mary Stoiana withdrew from the final.

Emily Appleton and Maia Lumsden were the defending champions when the tournament was last held in 2024, but Appleton chose to compete in Oeiras instead. Lumsden partnered Isabelle Haverlag, but lost in the quarterfinals to Smith and Stoiana.

== Seeds ==
1. (United States) Sabrina Santamaria / (China) Tang Qianhui (champions)
2. (Netherlands) Isabelle Haverlag / (United Kingdom) Maia Lumsden (quarterfinals)
3. (United States) Quinn Gleason / (United States) Dalayna Hewitt (semifinals)
4. (Canada) Kayla Cross / (United States) Anna Rogers (quarterfinals)

== Draw ==
Key

- Q = Qualifier
- WC = Wild card
- LL = Lucky loser
- Alt = Alternate
- ITF = ITF entry
- PR = Protected ranking
- SR = Special ranking
- SE = Special exempt
- JE = Junior exempt
- JR = Junior Accelerator Programme entrant
- CO = College Accelerator Programme entrant
- NG = Next Gen Accelerator Program entrant
- w/o = Walkover
- r = Retired
- d = Defaulted

=== Draw ===
First round
(United States) J Loeb (Ukraine) V Strakhova	2	4
(China) Y Dang (China) X You	6	6
4	(Canada) K Cross (United States) A Rogers	6	6
(Argentina) M Capurro Taborda (Mexico) M Gómez Pezuela Cano	1	0
(United States) C Harrison (Serbia) K Jokić	6	5	[5]
(United States) L Ma (Czech Republic) D Viďmanová	2	7	[10]
(United States) H Chang (United States) V Hu	1	3
(Bulgaria) L Karatancheva (Japan) H Kuwata	6	6
(United States) M Lewis (Canada) K Sebov	4	6	[8]
3	(United States) Q Gleason (United States) D Hewitt	6	2	[10]
(United States) A Smith (United States) M Stoiana	w/o
(Venezuela) SE Cabezas Domínguez (United States) S Daavettila
WC	(United States) E Coleman (United States) C Tanguilig	4	2
2	(Netherlands) I Haverlag (United Kingdom) M Lumsden	6	6

Quarterfinals
1	(United States) S Santamaria (China) Q Tang	6	6
(China) Y Dang (China) X You	4	3
4	(Canada) K Cross (United States) A Rogers	2	6^{5}
(United States) L Ma (Czech Republic) D Viďmanová	6	7^{7}
(Bulgaria) L Karatancheva (Japan) H Kuwata	3	2
3	(United States) Q Gleason (United States) D Hewitt	6	6
(United States) A Smith (United States) M Stoiana	6	2	[10]
2	(Netherlands) I Haverlag (United Kingdom) M Lumsden	1	6	[3]

Semifinals
1	(United States) S Santamaria (China) Q Tang	7	6
(United States) L Ma (Czech Republic) D Viďmanová	5	0
3	(United States) Q Gleason (United States) D Hewitt	5	3
(United States) A Smith (United States) M Stoiana	7	6

Final
1	(United States) S Santamaria (China) Q Tang	w/o
(United States) A Smith (United States) M Stoiana
