= 2018 Dow Tennis Classic – Singles =

Singles
- 2018 Dow Tennis Classic

Final
- Champion: (United States) Madison Brengle
- Runner-up: (United States) Jamie Loeb
- Score: 6–1, 6–2

Events
| Singles | Doubles |
| ← 2017 · | Dow Tennis Classic | · 2019 → |

Tatjana Maria was the defending champion, but chose to compete at the 2018 St. Petersburg Ladies' Trophy instead.

Madison Brengle won the title, defeating Jamie Loeb in the final 6–1, 6–2.

== Seeds ==
1. (Romania) Mihaela Buzărnescu (semifinals)
2. (United States) Jennifer Brady (semifinals)
3. (United States) Madison Brengle (champion)
4. (United States) Sofia Kenin (second round)
5. (United States) Sachia Vickery (second round, retired)
6. (Netherlands) Richèl Hogenkamp (first round)
7. (Colombia) Mariana Duque Mariño (first round)
8. (Russia) Evgeniya Rodina (quarterfinals)

== Draw ==
Key

- Q = Qualifier
- WC = Wild card
- LL = Lucky loser
- Alt = Alternate
- ITF = ITF entry
- PR = Protected ranking
- SR = Special ranking
- SE = Special exempt
- JE = Junior exempt
- JR = Junior Accelerator Programme entrant
- CO = College Accelerator Programme entrant
- NG = Next Gen Accelerator Program entrant
- w/o = Walkover
- r = Retired
- d = Defaulted

=== Finals ===
Semifinals
1 | (Romania) Mihaela Buzărnescu | 4 | 1
3/WC | (United States) Madison Brengle | 6 | 6
(United States) Jamie Loeb | 7 | 4 | 6
2 | (United States) Jennifer Brady | 5 | 6 | 4

Final
3/WC | (United States) Madison Brengle | 6 | 6
(United States) Jamie Loeb | 1 | 2

=== Top half ===
First round
1 | (Romania) M Buzărnescu | 7 | 7
(United Kingdom) N Broady | 5 | 5
(Switzerland) S Vögele | 6 | 6
(Slovakia) AK Schmiedlová | 4 | 3
Q | (Norway) U Eikeri | 1 | 3
(Sweden) R Peterson | 6 | 6
WC | (United States) J Pegula | 6 | 6
7 | (Colombia) M Duque Mariño | 2 | 1
3/WC | (United States) M Brengle | 6 | 6
(Switzerland) J Teichmann | 1 | 1
(United States) J Boserup | 6^{7} | 6 | 6
Q | (Serbia) J Jakšić | 7^{9} | 2 | 3
(Netherlands) L Kerkhove | 1 | 0
Q | (Canada) K Sebov | 6 | 6
WC | (United States) V Duval | 3 | 2
8 | (Russia) E Rodina | 6 | 6

Second round
1 | (Romania) M Buzărnescu | 1 | 6 | 6
(Switzerland) S Vögele | 6 | 0 | 2
(Sweden) R Peterson | 7 | 6
WC | (United States) J Pegula | 5 | 4
3/WC | (United States) M Brengle | 6 | 6
(United States) J Boserup | 2 | 2
Q | (Canada) K Sebov | 3 | 5
8 | (Russia) E Rodina | 6 | 7

Quarterfinals
1 | (Romania) M Buzărnescu | 7^{7} | 4 | 6
(Sweden) R Peterson | 6^{5} | 6 | 3
3/WC | (United States) M Brengle | 6 | 6
8 | (Russia) E Rodina | 1 | 1

Semifinals
1 | (Romania) M Buzărnescu | 4 | 1
3/WC | (United States) M Brengle | 6 | 6

=== Bottom half ===
First round
6 | (Netherlands) R Hogenkamp | 0 | 1
(Canada) C Zhao | 6 | 6
(Romania) I Bara | 7^{7} | 7^{7}
LL | (United States) UM Arconada | 6^{5} | 6^{4}
(Czech Republic) M Bouzková | 4 | 7 | 3
(United States) J Loeb | 6 | 5 | 6
WC | (United States) W Osuigwe | 2 | 3
4 | (United States) S Kenin | 6 | 6
5 | (United States) S Vickery | 7^{7} | 6
Q | (United States) A Li | 6^{4} | 1
(Canada) B Andreescu | 6 | 6
(Japan) M Doi | 2 | 4
(Canada) F Abanda | 6 | 6
(United States) D Collins | 2 | 2
(South Korea) S-j Jang | 6^{2} | 6 | 2
2 | (United States) J Brady | 7^{7} | 4 | 6

Second round
(Canada) C Zhao | 6 | 6
(Romania) I Bara | 2 | 1
(United States) J Loeb | 6 | 6
4 | (United States) S Kenin | 3 | 2
5 | (United States) S Vickery | 1 | 0^{r}
(Canada) B Andreescu | 6 | 1
(Canada) F Abanda | 4 | 2
2 | (United States) J Brady | 6 | 6

Quarterfinals
(Canada) C Zhao | 2 | 0
(United States) J Loeb | 6 | 6
(Canada) B Andreescu | 4 | 5
2 | (United States) J Brady | 6 | 7

Semifinals
(United States) J Loeb | 7 | 4 | 6
2 | (United States) J Brady | 5 | 6 | 4
