= 2019 Dow Tennis Classic – Singles =

Singles
- 2019 Dow Tennis Classic

Final
- Champion: (United States) Caty McNally
- Runner-up: (United States) Jessica Pegula
- Score: 6–2, 6–4

Events
Singles	Doubles
← 2018 ·	Dow Tennis Classic	· 2020 →

Madison Brengle was the defending champion but lost to Caty McNally in the quarterfinals.

McNally won the title, defeating Jessica Pegula in the final, 6–2, 6–4.

== Seeds ==
1. (Sweden) Rebecca Peterson (semifinals)
2. (Germany) Tatjana Maria (first round)
3. (United States) Madison Brengle (quarterfinals)
4. (United States) Jessica Pegula (final)
5. (Czech Republic) Marie Bouzková (second round)
6. (Belgium) Yanina Wickmayer (quarterfinals)
7. (United States) Nicole Gibbs (first round)
8. (Switzerland) Jil Teichmann (first round)

== Draw ==
Key

- Q = Qualifier
- WC = Wild card
- LL = Lucky loser
- Alt = Alternate
- ITF = ITF entry
- PR = Protected ranking
- SR = Special ranking
- SE = Special exempt
- JE = Junior exempt
- JR = Junior Accelerator Programme entrant
- CO = College Accelerator Programme entrant
- NG = Next Gen Accelerator Program entrant
- w/o = Walkover
- r = Retired
- d = Defaulted

=== Finals ===
Semifinals
1	(Sweden) Rebecca Peterson	3	3
WC	(United States) Caty McNally	6	6
4	(United States) Jessica Pegula	6	6
Q	(United States) Robin Anderson	4	2

Final
WC	(United States) Caty McNally	6	6
4	(United States) Jessica Pegula	2	4

=== Top half ===
First round
1	(Sweden) R Peterson	6	6
Q	(Japan) C Muramatsu	0	3
WC	(United States) A Kratzer	6^{6}	7^{8}	4
WC	(United States) C Gauff	7^{8}	6^{6}	6
Q	(Russia) V Savinykh	4	2
(United States) K Ahn	6	6
(Japan) M Hibi	7	2	3
5	(Czech Republic) M Bouzková	5	6	6
3	(United States) M Brengle	7^{7}	6
Q	(Poland) U Radwańska	6^{4}	3
WC	(United States) G Min	6	3	2
(United States) J Loeb	4	6	6
(Canada) K Sebov	3	2
(Canada) R Marino	6	6
WC	(United States) C McNally	6	7
7	(United States) N Gibbs	0	5

Second round
1	(Sweden) R Peterson	6	6
WC	(United States) C Gauff	2	1
(United States) K Ahn	6	6
5	(Czech Republic) M Bouzková	3	2
3	(United States) M Brengle	6	6
(United States) J Loeb	1	4
(Canada) R Marino	4	1
WC	(United States) C McNally	6	6

Quarterfinals
1	(Sweden) R Peterson	6	4	6
(United States) K Ahn	3	6	4
3	(United States) M Brengle	3	4
WC	(United States) C McNally	6	6

Semifinals
1	(Sweden) R Peterson	3	3
WC	(United States) C McNally	6	6

=== Bottom half ===
First round
8	(Switzerland) J Teichmann	6	3	3
(United States) C McHale	3	6	6
(Paraguay) V Cepede Royg	3	6	6
(China) S Xu	6	1	3
(United States) F Di Lorenzo	6	6
(United States) L Davis	3	4
(Canada) F Abanda	5	2
4	(United States) J Pegula	7	6
6	(Belgium) Y Wickmayer	6	7
(China) Jia Lu	3	5
Q	(Serbia) J Jakšić	6	4	4
Q	(United States) A Li	3	6	6
(United States) D Lao	5	1
Q	(United States) R Anderson	7	6
PR	(Belarus) O Govortsova	1	6	6
2	(Germany) T Maria	6	1	4

Second round
(United States) C McHale	6	6
(Paraguay) V Cepede Royg	4	4
(United States) F Di Lorenzo	1	4
4	(United States) J Pegula	6	6
6	(Belgium) Y Wickmayer	4	6	6
Q	(United States) A Li	6	3	2
Q	(United States) R Anderson	6	6
PR	(Belarus) O Govortsova	2	3

Quarterfinals
(United States) C McHale	6	3	4
4	(United States) J Pegula	1	6	6
6	(Belgium) Y Wickmayer	3	4
Q	(United States) R Anderson	6	6

Semifinals
4	(United States) J Pegula	6	6
Q	(United States) R Anderson	4	2
