= 2022 Dow Tennis Classic – Doubles =

Doubles
- 2022 Dow Tennis Classic

Final
- Champions: (United States) Asia Muhammad (United States) Alycia Parks
- Runners-up: (Germany) Anna-Lena Friedsam (Ukraine) Nadiia Kichenok
- Score: 6–2, 6–3

Events
| Singles | Doubles |
| ← 2021 · | Dow Tennis Classic | · 2023 → |

Harriet Dart and Asia Muhammad were the defending champions but Dart chose not to participate.

Muhammad partnered Alycia Parks and successfully defended her title, defeating Anna-Lena Friedsam and Nadiia Kichenok in the final, 6–2, 6–3.

== Seeds ==
1. (United States) Asia Muhammad / (United States) Alycia Parks (champions)
2. (United States) Sophie Chang / (United States) Angela Kulikov (quarterfinals)
3. (United States) Kaitlyn Christian / Lidziya Marozava (first round)
4. (United States) Catherine Harrison / (United States) Sabrina Santamaria (first round)

== Draw ==
Key

- Q = Qualifier
- WC = Wild card
- LL = Lucky loser
- Alt = Alternate
- ITF = ITF entry
- PR = Protected ranking
- SR = Special ranking
- SE = Special exempt
- JE = Junior exempt
- JR = Junior Accelerator Programme entrant
- CO = College Accelerator Programme entrant
- NG = Next Gen Accelerator Program entrant
- w/o = Walkover
- r = Retired
- d = Defaulted

=== Draw ===
First round
1 | (United States) A Muhammad (United States) A Parks | 2 | 6 | [10]
(Australia) E Bolton (United States) J Loeb | 6 | 3 | [6]
(United States) E Bektas (United States) I Neel | 6 | 6
(Romania) E-T Cadar (Romania) G Lee | 1 | 1
4 | (United States) C Harrison (United States) S Santamaria | 6 | 5 | [7]
(United States) A Krueger (United States) R Montgomery | 2 | 7 | [10]
(Netherlands) A Hartono (Australia) O Tjandramulia | 3 | 2
(United States) E Kalieva (United States) P Stearns | 6 | 6
(Japan) N Hibino (Indonesia) A Sutjiadi | 6 | 6
WC | (Czech Republic) K Beránková (United States) E Coleman | 3 | 1
(Japan) M Uchijima (China) L Zhu | 6 | 6
3 | (United States) K Christian; L Marozava | 1 | 2
(Germany) A-L Friedsam (Ukraine) N Kichenok | 6 | 6
(United States) H Chang (United States) F Di Lorenzo | 2 | 1
(United States) M Brengle (United States) K Day | 3 | 6 | [6]
2 | (United States) S Chang (United States) A Kulikov | 6 | 0 | [10]

Quarterfinals
1 | (United States) A Muhammad (United States) A Parks | 6 | 6
(United States) E Bektas (United States) I Neel | 4 | 4
(United States) A Krueger (United States) R Montgomery | 6 | 6
(United States) E Kalieva (United States) P Stearns | 1 | 2
(Japan) N Hibino (Indonesia) A Sutjiadi | 4 | 6 | [9]
(Japan) M Uchijima (China) L Zhu | 6 | 4 | [11]
(Germany) A-L Friedsam (Ukraine) N Kichenok | 7^{7} | 6
2 | (United States) S Chang (United States) A Kulikov | 6^{4} | 4

Semifinals
1 | (United States) A Muhammad (United States) A Parks | 3 | 6 | [10]
(United States) A Krueger (United States) R Montgomery | 6 | 1 | [8]
(Japan) M Uchijima (China) L Zhu | 2 | 6 | [11]
(Germany) A-L Friedsam (Ukraine) N Kichenok | 6 | 4 | [13]

Final
1 | (United States) A Muhammad (United States) A Parks | 6 | 6
(Germany) A-L Friedsam (Ukraine) N Kichenok | 2 | 3
