= 2024 Dow Tennis Classic – Singles =

Singles
- 2024 Dow Tennis Classic

Final
- Champion: (Canada) Rebecca Marino
- Runner-up: (United States) Alycia Parks
- Score: 6–2, 6–1

Events
Singles	Doubles
← 2023 ·	Dow Tennis Classic	· 2025 →

Anna Kalinskaya was the reigning champion, but did not participate this year.

Rebecca Marino won the title, defeating Alycia Parks 6–2, 6–1 in the final. It was Marino's first WTA 125 title.

== Seeds ==
1. (Mexico) Renata Zarazúa (withdrew)
2. (Germany) Tatjana Maria (first round)
3. (United States) Alycia Parks (final)
4. (Australia) Maya Joint (first round)
5. (United States) Ann Li (first round)
6. (Canada) Rebecca Marino (champion)
7. (Canada) Marina Stakusic (first round)
8. (Ukraine) Lesia Tsurenko (semifinals)
9. Polina Kudermetova (second round)

== Draw ==
Key

- Q = Qualifier
- WC = Wild card
- LL = Lucky loser
- Alt = Alternate
- ITF = ITF entry
- PR = Protected ranking
- SR = Special ranking
- SE = Special exempt
- JE = Junior exempt
- JR = Junior Accelerator Programme entrant
- CO = College Accelerator Programme entrant
- NG = Next Gen Accelerator Program entrant
- w/o = Walkover
- r = Retired
- d = Defaulted

=== Finals ===
Semifinals
8	(Ukraine) Lesia Tsurenko	2	5
6	(Canada) Rebecca Marino	6	7
3	(United States) Alycia Parks	6	6
WC	(United States) Lauren Davis	3	3

Final
6	(Canada) Rebecca Marino	6	6
3	(United States) Alycia Parks	2	1

=== Top half ===
First round
9	P Kudermetova	6	6
WC	(United States) K Scott	4	2
WC	(United States) K Miller	4	7^{7}	6
LL	(United States) J Loeb	6	6^{4}	1
(Switzerland) J Teichmann	7^{7}	6
(United States) E Mandlik	6^{2}	2
(Slovenia) T Zidanšek	2	2
8	(Ukraine) L Tsurenko	6	6
4	(Australia) M Joint	5	6^{4}
PR	A Korneeva	7	7^{7}
(Czech Republic) G Knutson	6	5	7
(Lithuania) J Mikulskytė	0	7	5
(Canada) C Zhao	6^{5}	2
(United States) L Chirico	7^{7}	6
Q	(United States) R Anderson	4	6^{4}
6	(Canada) R Marino	6	7^{7}

Second round
9	P Kudermetova	3	6	6^{8}
WC	(United States) K Miller	6	2	7^{10}
(Switzerland) J Teichmann	5	5
8	(Ukraine) L Tsurenko	7	7
PR	A Korneeva	7	7
(Czech Republic) G Knutson	5	5
(United States) L Chirico	7^{10}	2	6^{7}
6	(Canada) R Marino	6^{8}	6	7^{9}

Quarterfinals
WC	(United States) K Miller	6	2	2
8	(Ukraine) L Tsurenko	3	6	6
PR	A Korneeva	4	5
6	(Canada) R Marino	6	7

Semifinals
8	(Ukraine) L Tsurenko	2	5
6	(Canada) R Marino	6	7

=== Bottom half ===
First round
5	(United States) A Li	4	6	6^{3}
(Australia) A Sharma	6	4	7^{7}
(United States) S Chang	5	1
A Tikhonova	7	6
WC	(United States) C McNally	6	6
LL	(Switzerland) L Küng	0	4
(Israel) L Glushko	6	2	4
3	(United States) A Parks	4	6	6
7	(Canada) M Stakusic	4	7^{7}	6^{3}
(United States) V Lepchenko	6	6^{2}	7^{7}
Q	(United Kingdom) E Appleton	1	4
Q	(Japan) H Kaji	6	6
WC	(United States) L Davis	7^{7}	6
A Charaeva	6^{3}	3
Q	(United States) W Osuigwe	6	6
2	(Germany) T Maria	3	3

Second round
(Australia) A Sharma	6	6
A Tikhonova	3	3
WC	(United States) C McNally	1	6	4
3	(United States) A Parks	6	4	6
(United States) V Lepchenko	6^{5}	6	6
Q	(Japan) H Kaji	7^{7}	4	4
WC	(United States) L Davis	6	6
Q	(United States) W Osuigwe	0	1

Quarterfinals
(Australia) A Sharma	3	1
3	(United States) A Parks	6	6
(United States) V Lepchenko	6^{8}	6	2
WC	(United States) L Davis	7^{10}	3	6

Semifinals
3	(United States) A Parks	6	6
WC	(United States) L Davis	3	3

== Qualifying ==
=== Seeds ===
1. (United States) Maria Mateas (first round)
2. (Switzerland) Leonie Küng (qualifying competition, lucky loser)
3. (Poland) Katarzyna Kawa (first round)
4. (United States) Robin Anderson (qualified)
5. (United States) Victoria Hu (first round)
6. (Japan) Haruka Kaji (qualified)
7. (Canada) Katherine Sebov (first round, retired)
8. (Romania) Gabriela Lee (first round)

=== Qualifiers ===
1. (United Kingdom) Emily Appleton
2. (Japan) Haruka Kaji
3. (United States) Whitney Osuigwe
4. (United States) Robin Anderson

=== Lucky losers ===
1. (Switzerland) Leonie Küng
2. (United States) Jamie Loeb

=== Draw ===
==== First qualifier ====
First round
1	(United States) Maria Mateas	2	7^{8}	4
(United States) Alana Smith	6	6^{6}	6
(United Kingdom) Emily Appleton	6	6
5	(United States) Victoria Hu	4	2

Qualifying competition
(United States) Alana Smith	2	2
(United Kingdom) Emily Appleton	6	6

==== Second qualifier ====
First round
2	(Switzerland) Leonie Küng	6	6
WC	(United States) Elizabeth Coleman	4	3
(United Kingdom) Tara Moore	0	2
6	(Japan) Haruka Kaji	6	6

Qualifying competition
2	(Switzerland) Leonie Küng	2	2
6	(Japan) Haruka Kaji	6	6

==== Third qualifier ====
First round
3	(Poland) Katarzyna Kawa	3	0
(United States) Whitney Osuigwe	6	6
(United States) Jamie Loeb	6	5	4
7	(Canada) Katherine Sebov	2	7	1^{r}

Qualifying competition
(United States) Whitney Osuigwe	6	7^{9}
(United States) Jamie Loeb	3	6^{7}

==== Fourth qualifier ====
First round
4	(United States) Robin Anderson	6	6
(Poland) Urszula Radwańska	3	4
WC	(United States) Anna Frey	6	6
8	(Romania) Gabriela Lee	4	2

Qualifying competition
4	(United States) Robin Anderson	6	6
WC	(United States) Anna Frey	2	4
