= 2023 Dow Tennis Classic – Doubles =

Doubles
- 2023 Dow Tennis Classic

Final
- Champions: (United States) Hailey Baptiste (United States) Whitney Osuigwe
- Runners-up: (United States) Sophie Chang (United States) Ashley Lahey
- Score: 2–6, 6–2, [10–1]

Events
Singles	Doubles
← 2022 ·	Dow Tennis Classic	· 2024 →

Hailey Baptiste and Whitney Osuigwe won the title, defeating Sophie Chang and Ashley Lahey in the final, 2–6, 6–2, [10–1].

Asia Muhammad and Alycia Parks were the reigning champions, but chose not to participate this year.

== Seeds ==
1. (United States) Sabrina Santamaria / (United Kingdom) Heather Watson (semifinals)
2. (Switzerland) Conny Perrin / Iryna Shymanovich (withdrew)
3. (United States) Sophie Chang / (United States) Ashley Lahey (final)
4. (United States) Ashlyn Krueger / (United States) Angela Kulikov (semifinals)

== Draw ==
Key

- Q = Qualifier
- WC = Wild card
- LL = Lucky loser
- Alt = Alternate
- ITF = ITF entry
- PR = Protected ranking
- SR = Special ranking
- SE = Special exempt
- JE = Junior exempt
- JR = Junior Accelerator Programme entrant
- CO = College Accelerator Programme entrant
- NG = Next Gen Accelerator Program entrant
- w/o = Walkover
- r = Retired
- d = Defaulted

=== Draw ===
First round
1	(United States) S Santamaria (United Kingdom) H Watson	5	6	[11]
(United States) C Corley (United States) I Corley	7	3	[9]
(United States) D Hewitt (United States) V Hu	6	4	[10]
(France) C Monnet (Cyprus) R Șerban	3	6	[3]
3	(United States) S Chang (United States) A Lahey	6	6
(Colombia) E Arango (United States) K Scott	1	3
(United States) A Rogers (United States) A Smith	w/o
(United States) V Lepchenko; T Prozorova
(United States) R McAdoo (Australia) A Osborne	3	0
(United States) M Kessler; M Kozyreva	6	6
(United States) S Sewing; A Tikhonova	4	3
4	(United States) A Krueger (United States) A Kulikov	6	6
(United States) H Baptiste (United States) W Osuigwe	7^{7}	2	[10]
(United States) R Anderson (United States) C Harrison	6^{5}	6	[8]
WC	(United States) C Beck (United States) E Coleman	w/o
2	(Switzerland) C Perrin; I Shymanovich

Quarterfinals
1	(United States) S Santamaria (United Kingdom) H Watson	4	6	[10]
(United States) D Hewitt (United States) V Hu	6	3	[4]
3	(United States) S Chang (United States) A Lahey	6	6
(United States) A Rogers (United States) A Smith	4	4
(United States) M Kessler; M Kozyreva	6	5	[9]
4	(United States) A Krueger (United States) A Kulikov	3	7	[11]
(United States) H Baptiste (United States) W Osuigwe	6	3	[10]
WC	(United States) C Beck (United States) E Coleman	1	6	[8]

Semifinals
1	(United States) S Santamaria (United Kingdom) H Watson	5	4
3	(United States) S Chang (United States) A Lahey	7	6
4	(United States) A Krueger (United States) A Kulikov	6	3	[7]
(United States) H Baptiste (United States) W Osuigwe	4	6	[10]

Final
3	(United States) S Chang (United States) A Lahey	6	2	[1]
(United States) H Baptiste (United States) W Osuigwe	2	6	[10]
