= 2020 Dow Tennis Classic – Doubles =

Doubles
- 2020 Dow Tennis Classic

Final
- Champions: (United States) Caroline Dolehide (United States) Maria Sanchez
- Runners-up: (Russia) Valeria Savinykh (Belgium) Yanina Wickmayer
- Score: 6–3, 6–4

Events
Singles	Doubles
← 2019 ·	Dow Tennis Classic	· 2021 →

Olga Govortsova and Valeria Savinykh were the defending champions but Govortsova chose not to participate.

Savinykh partnered Yanina Wickmayer, but lost in the final to Caroline Dolehide and Maria Sanchez, 6–3, 6–4.

== Seeds ==
1. (United States) Caroline Dolehide / (United States) Maria Sanchez (champions)
2. (Russia) Valeria Savinykh / (Belgium) Yanina Wickmayer (final)
3. (Germany) Mona Barthel / (Netherlands) Rosalie van der Hoek (quarterfinals)
4. (Georgia (country)) Sofia Shapatava / (United Kingdom) Emily Webley-Smith (first round)

== Draw ==
Key

- Q = Qualifier
- WC = Wild card
- LL = Lucky loser
- Alt = Alternate
- ITF = ITF entry
- PR = Protected ranking
- SR = Special ranking
- SE = Special exempt
- JE = Junior exempt
- JR = Junior Accelerator Programme entrant
- CO = College Accelerator Programme entrant
- NG = Next Gen Accelerator Program entrant
- w/o = Walkover
- r = Retired
- d = Defaulted

=== Draw ===
First round
1	(United States) C Dolehide (United States) M Sanchez	7	6
(United States) R Anderson (France) J Ponchet	5	4
(United States) Q Gleason (United States) C Harrison	6	6
WC	(United States) E Coleman (United States) K Miller	3	2
4	(Georgia (country)) S Shapatava (United Kingdom) E Webley-Smith	2	6	[3]
(United States) J Loeb (United States) I Neel	6	4	[10]
(United States) J Cako (United States) C Whoriskey	7	6
WC	(United States) A Glatch (United States) M Mateas	5	3
(Indonesia) B Gumulya (Indonesia) J Rompies	7	2	[6]
(Chinese Taipei) C-y Hsu (Mexico) M Zacarías	5	6	[10]
(United States) M Brengle (Ukraine) A Kalinina	4	2
3	(Germany) M Barthel (Netherlands) R van der Hoek	6	6
WC	(United States) S Chang (United States) G Min	4	6	[6]
(United States) E Bektas (United Kingdom) T Moore	6	2	[10]
(Hong Kong) E Chong (Indonesia) A Sutjiadi	5	5
2	(Russia) V Savinykh (Belgium) Y Wickmayer	7	7

Quarterfinals
1	(United States) C Dolehide (United States) M Sanchez	7	6^{4}	[10]
(United States) Q Gleason (United States) C Harrison	5	7^{7}	[8]
(United States) J Loeb (United States) I Neel	3	6	[10]
(United States) J Cako (United States) C Whoriskey	6	1	[4]
(Chinese Taipei) C-y Hsu (Mexico) M Zacarías	7	4	[10]
3	(Germany) M Barthel (Netherlands) R van der Hoek	5	6	[2]
(United States) E Bektas (United Kingdom) T Moore	3	5
2	(Russia) V Savinykh (Belgium) Y Wickmayer	6	7

Semifinals
1	(United States) C Dolehide (United States) M Sanchez	7	6
(United States) J Loeb (United States) I Neel	5	4
(Chinese Taipei) C-y Hsu (Mexico) M Zacarías	2	7^{7}	[3]
2	(Russia) V Savinykh (Belgium) Y Wickmayer	6	6^{3}	[10]

Final
1	(United States) C Dolehide (United States) M Sanchez	6	6
2	(Russia) V Savinykh (Belgium) Y Wickmayer	3	4
