= 2018 Dow Tennis Classic – Doubles =

Doubles
- 2018 Dow Tennis Classic

Final
- Champions: (United States) Kaitlyn Christian (United States) Sabrina Santamaria
- Runners-up: (United States) Jessica Pegula (United States) Maria Sanchez
- Score: 7–5, 4–6, [10–8]

Events
| Singles | Doubles |
| ← 2017 · | Dow Tennis Classic | · 2019 → |

Ashley Weinhold and Caitlin Whoriskey were the defending champions, however both players chose to participate with different partners. Weinhold played alongside Naomi Broady, but lost in the first round to Desirae Krawczyk and Giuliana Olmos. Whoriskey partnered Jacqueline Cako, but they were defeated in the first round by Julia Boserup and Lesley Kerkhove.

Kaitlyn Christian and Sabrina Santamaria won the title, defeating Jessica Pegula and Maria Sanchez in the final, 7–5, 4–6, [10–8].

== Seeds ==
1. (Colombia) Mariana Duque Mariño / (Argentina) María Irigoyen (semifinals)
2. (Romania) Irina Bara / (Romania) Mihaela Buzărnescu (quarterfinals)
3. (United States) Desirae Krawczyk / (Mexico) Giuliana Olmos (quarterfinals)
4. (United States) Jacqueline Cako / (United States) Caitlin Whoriskey (first round)

== Draw ==
Key

- Q = Qualifier
- WC = Wild card
- LL = Lucky loser
- Alt = Alternate
- ITF = ITF entry
- PR = Protected ranking
- SR = Special ranking
- SE = Special exempt
- JE = Junior exempt
- JR = Junior Accelerator Programme entrant
- CO = College Accelerator Programme entrant
- NG = Next Gen Accelerator Program entrant
- w/o = Walkover
- r = Retired
- d = Defaulted

=== Draw ===
First round
1 | (Colombia) M Duque Mariño (Argentina) M Irigoyen | 6 | 4 | [10]
(United States) M Brengle (Serbia) J Jakšić | 2 | 6 | [7]
(United States) S Chang (United States) A Mueller | 3 | 6 | [12]
PR | (United States) J Loeb (Sweden) R Peterson | 6 | 3 | [14]
4 | (United States) J Cako (United States) C Whoriskey | 3 | 6 | [3]
(United States) J Boserup (Netherlands) L Kerkhove | 6 | 4 | [10]
(United States) E Bektas (Chile) A Guarachi | 3 | 3
(United States) K Christian (United States) S Santamaria | 6 | 6
(United States) J Pegula (United States) M Sanchez | 7 | 6
WC | (United States) UM Arconada (United States) S Kenin | 5 | 4
(United Kingdom) N Broady (United States) A Weinhold | 2 | 4
3 | (United States) D Krawczyk (Mexico) G Olmos | 6 | 6
(Japan) A Okuno (Mexico) V Rodríguez | 6^{5} | 6 | [7]
WC | (United States) S Marand (United States) W Osuigwe | 7^{7} | 1 | [10]
WC | (United States) E Coleman (United States) K Miller | 4 | 4
2 | (Romania) I Bara (Romania) M Buzărnescu | 6 | 6

Quarterfinals
1 | (Colombia) M Duque Mariño (Argentina) M Irigoyen | w/o
PR | (United States) J Loeb (Sweden) R Peterson
(United States) J Boserup (Netherlands) L Kerkhove | 3 | 6^{3}
(United States) K Christian (United States) S Santamaria | 6 | 7^{7}
(United States) J Pegula (United States) M Sanchez | 6 | 6
3 | (United States) D Krawczyk (Mexico) G Olmos | 2 | 4
WC | (United States) S Marand (United States) W Osuigwe | 6 | 3 | [10]
2 | (Romania) I Bara (Romania) M Buzărnescu | 3 | 6 | [6]

Semifinals
1 | (Colombia) M Duque Mariño (Argentina) M Irigoyen | 7 | 6^{5} | [4]
(United States) K Christian (United States) S Santamaria | 5 | 7^{7} | [10]
(United States) J Pegula (United States) M Sanchez | 6 | 1 | [10]
WC | (United States) S Marand (United States) W Osuigwe | 4 | 6 | [8]

Final
(United States) K Christian (United States) S Santamaria | 7 | 4 | [10]
(United States) J Pegula (United States) M Sanchez | 5 | 6 | [8]
