= 2026 Dow Tennis Classic – Singles =

Singles
- 2026 Dow Tennis Classic

Final
- Champion: Alina Charaeva
- Runner-up: (China) Guo Hanyu
- Score: 6–4, 7–6^{(7–4)}

Events
Singles	Doubles
- Dow Tennis Classic

Rebecca Marino was the reigning champion when the tournament was last held in 2024, but chose not to participate.

Alina Charaeva won the title, defeating Guo Hanyu 6–4, 7–6^{(7–4)} in the final.

== Seeds ==
1. (United States) Ashlyn Krueger (first round)
2. (Czech Republic) Darja Viďmanová (semifinals)
3. (United States) Elvina Kalieva (quarterfinals)
4. (United States) Whitney Osuigwe (second round)
5. Alina Charaeva (champion)
6. (United States) Elizabeth Mandlik (first round)
7. (United States) Louisa Chirico (first round)
8. (United States) Mary Stoiana (semifinals)

== Draw ==
Key

- Q = Qualifier
- WC = Wild card
- LL = Lucky loser
- Alt = Alternate
- ITF = ITF entry
- PR = Protected ranking
- SR = Special ranking
- SE = Special exempt
- JE = Junior exempt
- JR = Junior Accelerator Programme entrant
- CO = College Accelerator Programme entrant
- NG = Next Gen Accelerator Program entrant
- w/o = Walkover
- r = Retired
- d = Defaulted

=== Finals ===
Semifinals
8	(United States) Mary Stoiana	6^{4}	7^{7}	5
(China) Guo Hanyu	7^{7}	6^{2}	7
5	Alina Charaeva	3	6	6
2	(Czech Republic) Darja Viďmanová	6	3	4

Final
(China) Guo Hanyu	4	6^{4}
5	Alina Charaeva	6	7^{7}

=== Top half ===
First round
1	(United States) A Krueger	5	6	5
(Canada) K Sebov	7	2	7
(Canada) C Brace	4	7	4
(Canada) K Cross	6	5	6
PR	(United States) M Brengle	6	6
(United States) K Scott	3	2
(United States) H Chang	6	6^{9}	2
8	(United States) M Stoiana	3	7^{11}	6
3	(United States) E Kalieva	6	6
(United States) A Rogers	4	2
Q	(Japan) S Hosogi	3	6	6
(United States) C Liu	6	1	3
(Serbia) K Jokić	6	2	6
WC	(United States) E Jones	4	6	2
(China) H Guo	3	6	6
7	(United States) L Chirico	6	4	2

Second round
(Canada) K Sebov	6	6
(Canada) K Cross	2	2
PR	(United States) M Brengle	2	2
8	(United States) M Stoiana	6	6
3	(United States) E Kalieva	6	6
Q	(Japan) S Hosogi	2	2
(Serbia) K Jokić	1	0^{r}
(China) H Guo	6	1

Quarterfinals
(Canada) K Sebov	3	4
8	(United States) M Stoiana	6	6
3	(United States) E Kalieva	2	6	6^{8}
(China) H Guo	6	2	7^{10}

Semifinals
8	(United States) M Stoiana	6^{4}	7^{7}	5
(China) H Guo	7^{7}	6^{2}	7

=== Bottom half ===
First round
5	A Charaeva	6	6
Q	(China) S Xu	0	4
(Bulgaria) L Karatancheva	2	3
(China) X You	6	6
(United States) C Ansari	2	7	4
(Japan) N Hibino	6	5	6
Q	(United States) D Hewitt	4	3
4	(United States) W Osuigwe	6	6
6	(United States) E Mandlik	5	2
WC	(United States) A Frey	7	6
WC	(United States) E Coleman	4	2
(United States) K Day	6	6
(Romania) G Lee	6	6
Q	(United States) L Ma	2	3
WC	(Japan) K Sawashiro	2	1
2	(Czech Republic) D Viďmanová	6	6

Second round
5	A Charaeva	6	7^{7}
(China) X You	4	6^{4}
(Japan) N Hibino	6	6
4	(United States) W Osuigwe	2	4
WC	(United States) A Frey	6	3	6
(United States) K Day	4	6	3
(Romania) G Lee	2	2
2	(Czech Republic) D Viďmanová	6	6

Quarterfinals
5	A Charaeva	7^{7}	6
(Japan) N Hibino	6^{5}	3
WC	(United States) A Frey	2	2
2	(Czech Republic) D Viďmanová	6	6

Semifinals
5	A Charaeva	3	6	6
2	(Czech Republic) D Viďmanová	6	3	4

== Qualifying ==
=== Seeds ===
1. (Japan) Sakura Hosogi (qualified)
2. (United States) Lea Ma (qualified)
3. (Argentina) Martina Capurro Taborda (first round)
4. (United States) Victoria Hu (qualifying competition)
5. (Ukraine) Valeriya Strakhova (first round)
6. (United States) Alana Smith (qualifying competition)
7. Mariia Tkacheva (first round)
8. (United States) Sara Daavettila (qualifying competition)

=== Qualifiers ===
1. (Japan) Sakura Hosogi
2. (United States) Lea Ma
3. (United States) Dalayna Hewitt
4. (China) Xu Shilin

=== Draw ===
==== First qualifier ====
First round
1	(Japan) Sakura Hosogi	4	6	6
WC	(United States) Carson Tanguilig	6	2	0
(United States) Ellie Schoppe	4	6^{4}
6	(United States) Alana Smith	6	7^{7}

Qualifying competition
1	(Japan) Sakura Hosogi	6	5	6
6	(United States) Alana Smith	4	7	3

==== Second qualifier ====
First round
2	(United States) Lea Ma	6	6
(United States) Jamie Loeb	2	2
WC	(United States) Savannah Matuszewski	0	1
8	(United States) Sara Daavettila	6	6

Qualifying competition
2	(United States) Lea Ma	6	7^{7}
8	(United States) Sara Daavettila	2	6^{5}

==== Third qualifier ====
First round
3	(Argentina) Martina Capurro Taborda	1	6	4
(Venezuela) Sofía Elena Cabezas Domínguez	6	3	6
(United States) Dalayna Hewitt	6	6
5	(Ukraine) Valeriya Strakhova	4	4

Qualifying competition
(Venezuela) Sofía Elena Cabezas Domínguez	2	5
(United States) Dalayna Hewitt	6	7

==== Fourth qualifier ====
First round
4	(United States) Victoria Hu	6	6
(United States) Mary Lewis	1	4
(China) Xu Shilin	6	3	6
7	Mariia Tkacheva	3	6	3

Qualifying competition
4	(United States) Victoria Hu	4	6	2
(China) Xu Shilin	6	1	6
