= Dow Tennis Classic =

WTA 125
- Event name: Dow Tennis Classic (2017–present); Dow Corning Tennis Classic (1994–2016)
- Location: Midland, Michigan, United States
- Venue: Greater Midland Tennis Center
- Category: WTA 125
- Surface: Hard/indoors
- Draw: 32S / 15D
- Prize money: $115,000
- Website: dowtennisclassic.com

Current champions (2026)
- Women's singles: Alina Charaeva
- Women's doubles: (United States) Sabrina Santamaria (China) Tang Qianhui

The Dow Tennis Classic or Dow Corning Tennis Classic (DCTC) is a WTA 125 level tennis tournament. It is played in October–November each year in Midland, Michigan. From 2010 to 2020, it used to be held as a $100,000 tournament as part of the ITF Women's Circuit, before being upgraded to a WTA 125 event in 2021.

== Past finals ==
=== Singles ===
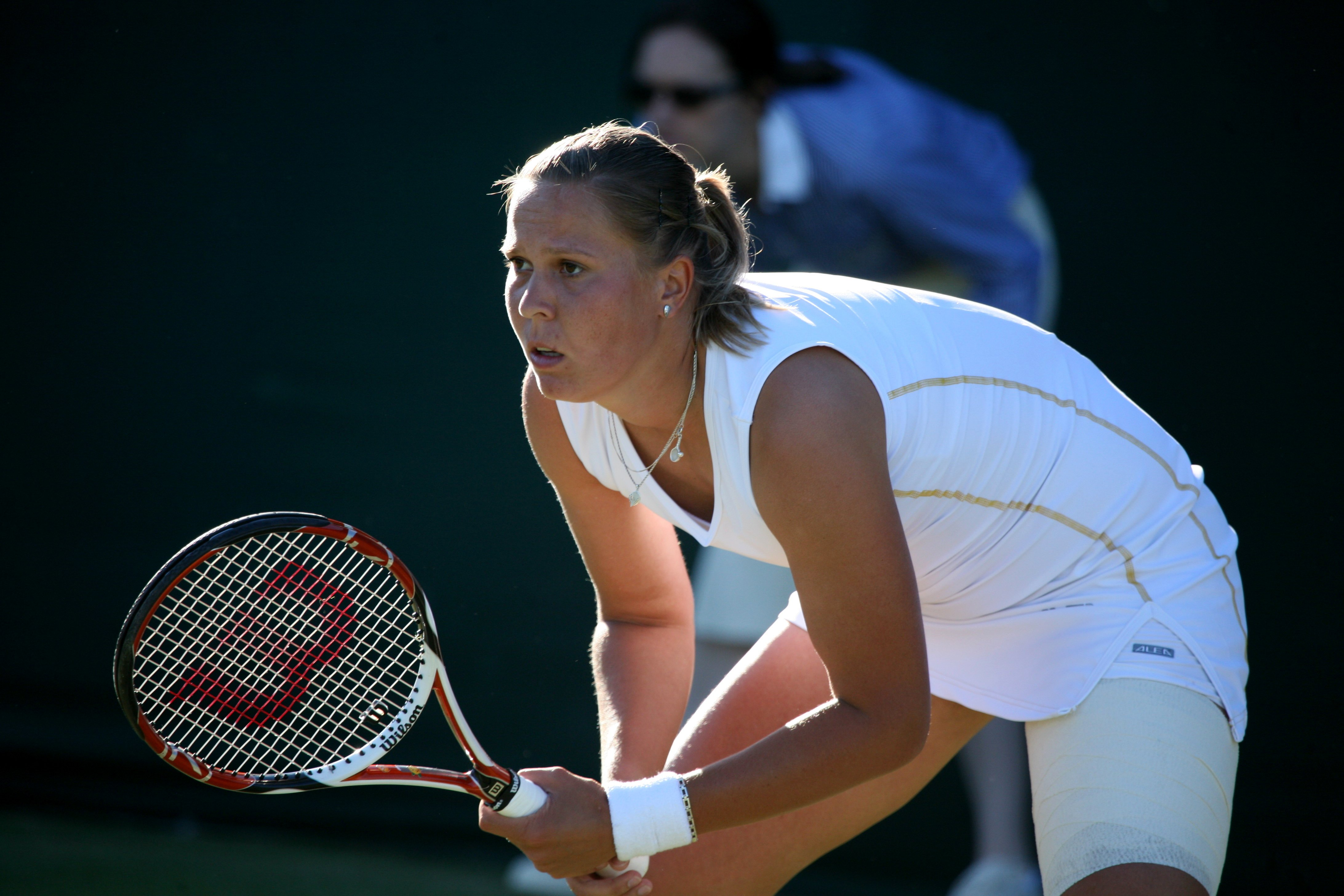
Lucie Hradecká reached three consecutive finals in 2009, 2010 and 2011. She lifted the trophy in 2009 and 2011.

| Year | Champion | Runner-up | Score |
|---|---|---|---|
| 2026 | Alina Charaeva | (China) Guo Hanyu | 6–4, 7–6^{(7–4)} |
| 2025 | Not held | | |
| 2024 | (Canada) Rebecca Marino | (United States) Alycia Parks | 6–2, 6–1 |
| 2023 | Anna Kalinskaya | (Croatia) Jana Fett | 7–5, 6–4 |
| 2022 | (United States) Caty McNally (2) | (Germany) Anna-Lena Friedsam | 6–3, 6–2 |
| 2021 | (United States) Madison Brengle (2) | (United States) Robin Anderson | 6–2, 6–4 |
⬆️ WTA 125 event ⬆️
| 2020 | (United States) Shelby Rogers | (Ukraine) Anhelina Kalinina | w/o |
| 2019 | (United States) Caty McNally | (United States) Jessica Pegula | 6–2, 6–4 |
| 2018 | (United States) Madison Brengle | (United States) Jamie Loeb | 6–1, 6–2 |
| 2017 | (Germany) Tatjana Maria (2) | (United Kingdom) Naomi Broady | 6–4, 6–7^{(6–8)}, 6–4 |
| 2016 | (United Kingdom) Naomi Broady | (United States) Robin Anderson | 6–7^{(6–8)}, 6–0, 6–2 |
| 2015 | (Germany) Tatjana Maria | (United States) Louisa Chirico | 6–2, 6–0 |
| 2014 | (United Kingdom) Heather Watson | (Russia) Ksenia Pervak | 6–4, 6–0 |
| 2013 | (United States) Lauren Davis | (Croatia) Ajla Tomljanović | 6–3, 2–6, 7–6^{(7–2)} |
| 2012 | (Belarus) Olga Govortsova | (Slovakia) Magdaléna Rybáriková | 6–3, 6–7^{(6–8)}, 7–6^{(7–5)} |
| 2011 | (Czech Republic) Lucie Hradecká (2) | (United States) Irina Falconi | 6–4, 6–4 |
| 2010 | (United Kingdom) Elena Baltacha | (Czech Republic) Lucie Hradecká | 5–7, 6–2, 6–3 |
| 2009 | (Czech Republic) Lucie Hradecká | (Greece) Eleni Daniilidou | 6–3, 6–3 |
| 2008 | (United States) Laura Granville | (United States) Ashley Harkleroad | 6–1, 6–1 |
| 2007 | (United States) Jill Craybas (2) | (United States) Laura Granville | 2–6, 6–3, 6–3 |
| 2006 | (Argentina) María Emilia Salerni | (Russia) Vasilisa Bardina | 6–3, 3–6, 6–4 |
| 2005 | (United States) Laura Granville | (South Korea) Cho Yoon-jeong | 6–3, 3–6, 7–6^{(8–6)} |
| 2004 | (United States) Jill Craybas | (Czech Republic) Nicole Vaidišová | 6–2, 6–4 |
| 2003 | (Germany) Bianka Lamade | (United States) Laura Granville | 6–3, 1–6, 6–4 |
| 2002 | (China) Li Na | (United States) Mashona Washington | 6–1, 6–2 |
| 2001 | (South Korea) Cho Yoon-jeong | (United States) Tara Snyder | 6–3, 6–1 |
| 2000 | (Australia) Nicole Pratt | (Japan) Yuka Yoshida | 6–4, 6–3 |
| 1999 | (Luxembourg) Anne Kremer | (United States) Tara Snyder | 3–6, 6–1, 7–5 |
| 1998 | (United States) Alexandra Stevenson | (United States) Samantha Reeves | 7–6, 6–1 |
| 1997 | (United States) Kimberly Po | (United States) Meilen Tu | 6–2, 6–3 |
| 1996 | (Russia) Anna Kournikova | (United States) Lindsay Lee | 7–6, 6–1 |
| 1995 | (United States) Chanda Rubin | (Netherlands) Brenda Schultz | 6–3, 6–2 |
| 1994 | (Netherlands) Brenda Schultz | (United States) Meredith McGrath | 6–2, 1–0 ret. |

=== Doubles ===
| Year | Champions | Runners-up | Score |
|---|---|---|---|
| 2026 | (United States) Sabrina Santamaria (2) (China) Tang Qianhui | (United States) Alana Smith (United States) Mary Stoiana | walkover |
| 2025 | Not held | | |
| 2024 | (United Kingdom) Emily Appleton (United Kingdom) Maia Lumsden | (Canada) Ariana Arseneault (Canada) Mia Kupres | 6–2, 4–6, [10–5] |
| 2023 | (United States) Hailey Baptiste (United States) Whitney Osuigwe | (United States) Sophie Chang (United States) Ashley Lahey | 2–6, 6–2, [10–1] |
| 2022 | (United States) Asia Muhammad (2) (United States) Alycia Parks | (Germany) Anna-Lena Friedsam (Ukraine) Nadiia Kichenok | 6–2, 6–3 |
| 2021 | (United Kingdom) Harriet Dart (United States) Asia Muhammad | (Thailand) Peangtarn Plipuech (Indonesia) Aldila Sutjiadi | 6–3, 2–6, [10–7] |
⬆️ WTA 125 event ⬆️
| 2020 | (United States) Caroline Dolehide (United States) Maria Sanchez | (Russia) Valeria Savinykh (Belgium) Yanina Wickmayer | 6–3, 6–4 |
| 2019 | (Belarus) Olga Govortsova (Russia) Valeria Savinykh | (United States) Coco Gauff (United States) Ann Li | 6–4, 6–0 |
| 2018 | (United States) Kaitlyn Christian (United States) Sabrina Santamaria | (United States) Jessica Pegula (United States) Maria Sanchez | 7–5, 4–6, [10–8] |
| 2017 | (United States) Ashley Weinhold (United States) Caitlin Whoriskey | (United States) Kayla Day (United States) Caroline Dolehide | 7–6^{(7–1)}, 6–3 |
| 2016 | (United States) CiCi Bellis (United States) Ingrid Neel | (United Kingdom) Naomi Broady (United States) Shelby Rogers | 6–2, 6–4 |
| 2015 | (France) Julie Coin (United Kingdom) Emily Webley-Smith | (United States) Jacqueline Cako (United States) Sachia Vickery | 4–6, 7–6^{(7–4)}, [11–9] |
| 2014 | (Georgia (country)) Anna Tatishvili (2) (United Kingdom) Heather Watson | (Canada) Sharon Fichman (United States) Maria Sanchez | 7–5, 5–7, [10–6] |
| 2013 | (Hungary) Melinda Czink (Croatia) Mirjana Lučić-Baroni | (Brazil) Maria Fernanda Alves (United Kingdom) Samantha Murray | 5–7, 6–4, [10–7] |
| 2012 | (Czech Republic) Andrea Hlaváčková (Czech Republic) Lucie Hradecká (2) | (Russia) Vesna Dolonts (France) Stéphanie Foretz Gacon | 7–6^{(7–4)}, 6–2 |
| 2011 | (United States) Jamie Hampton (Georgia (country)) Anna Tatishvili | (United States) Irina Falconi (United States) Alison Riske | w/o |
| 2010 | (Czech Republic) Lucie Hradecká (United States) Laura Granville (2) | (United States) Lilia Osterloh (Georgia (country)) Anna Tatishvili | 7–6^{(7–3)}, 3–6, [12–10] |
| 2009 | (Chinese Taipei) Chen Yi (Japan) Rika Fujiwara | (Hungary) Melinda Czink (United States) Lindsay Lee-Waters | 7–5, 7–6^{(7–5)} |
| 2008 | (United States) Ashley Harkleroad (United States) Shenay Perry | (South Africa) Surina de Beer (Japan) Rika Fujiwara | 3–6, 6–4, [10–6] |
| 2007 | (United States) Laura Granville (United States) Abigail Spears (2) | (Canada) Maureen Drake (Canada) Stéphanie Dubois | 6–4, 3–6, 6–3 |
| 2006 | (Venezuela) Milagros Sequera (United States) Meilen Tu | (Argentina) María José Argeri (Brazil) Letícia Sobral | 4–6, 7–5, 6–4 |
| 2005 | (Ukraine) Yuliya Beygelzimer (United States) Kelly McCain | (Russia) Anna Bastrikova (Belarus) Iryna Kuryanovich | 6–2, 6–4 |
| 2004 | (Sweden) Sofia Arvidsson (Sweden) Åsa Svensson | (United States) Allison Baker (United States) Tara Snyder | 7–6^{(7–5)}, 6–2 |
| 2003 | (United States) Teryn Ashley (United States) Abigail Spears | (United States) Bethanie Mattek (United States) Shenay Perry | 6–1, 4–6, 6–4 |
| 2002 | (Chinese Taipei) Janet Lee (Ukraine) Elena Tatarkova (2) | (Bulgaria) Maria Geznenge (Czech Republic) Michaela Paštiková | 6–1, 6–3 |
| 2001 | (Netherlands) Yvette Basting (Ukraine) Elena Tatarkova | (United States) Jennifer Hopkins (Slovenia) Petra Rampre | 3–6, 7–6^{(7–4)}, 6–4 |
| 2000 | (South Africa) Esmé de Villiers (Japan) Rika Hiraki | (South Africa) Surina de Beer (Israel) Tzipi Obziler | 6–1, 1–6, 6–1 |
| 1999 | (South Africa) Liezel Horn (United Kingdom) Samantha Smith | (Germany) Kirstin Freye (Canada) Sonya Jeyaseelan | 7–6, 0–6, 7–5 |
| 1998 | (Australia) Catherine Barclay (Australia) Kerry-Anne Guse | (Belarus) Olga Barabanschikova (United States) Erika deLone | 6–2, 6–4 |
| 1997 | (United States) Angela Lettiere (2) (Japan) Nana Miyagi | (United States) Janet Lee (United States) Lindsay Lee | 6–3, 6–2 |
| 1996 | (United States) Angela Lettiere (United States) Corina Morariu | (United States) Katrina Adams (United States) Debbie Graham | 7–6, 7–6 |
| 1995 | (United States) Chanda Rubin (Netherlands) Brenda Schultz | (United States) Laxmi Poruri (United States) Varalee Sureephong | 6–3, 6–2 |
| 1994 | (United States) Erica Adams (United States) Jeri Ingram | (Australia) Tracey Morton (United States) Vickie Paynter | 6–1, 5–7, 6–4 |
