= Caty McNally =

American tennis player (born 2001)

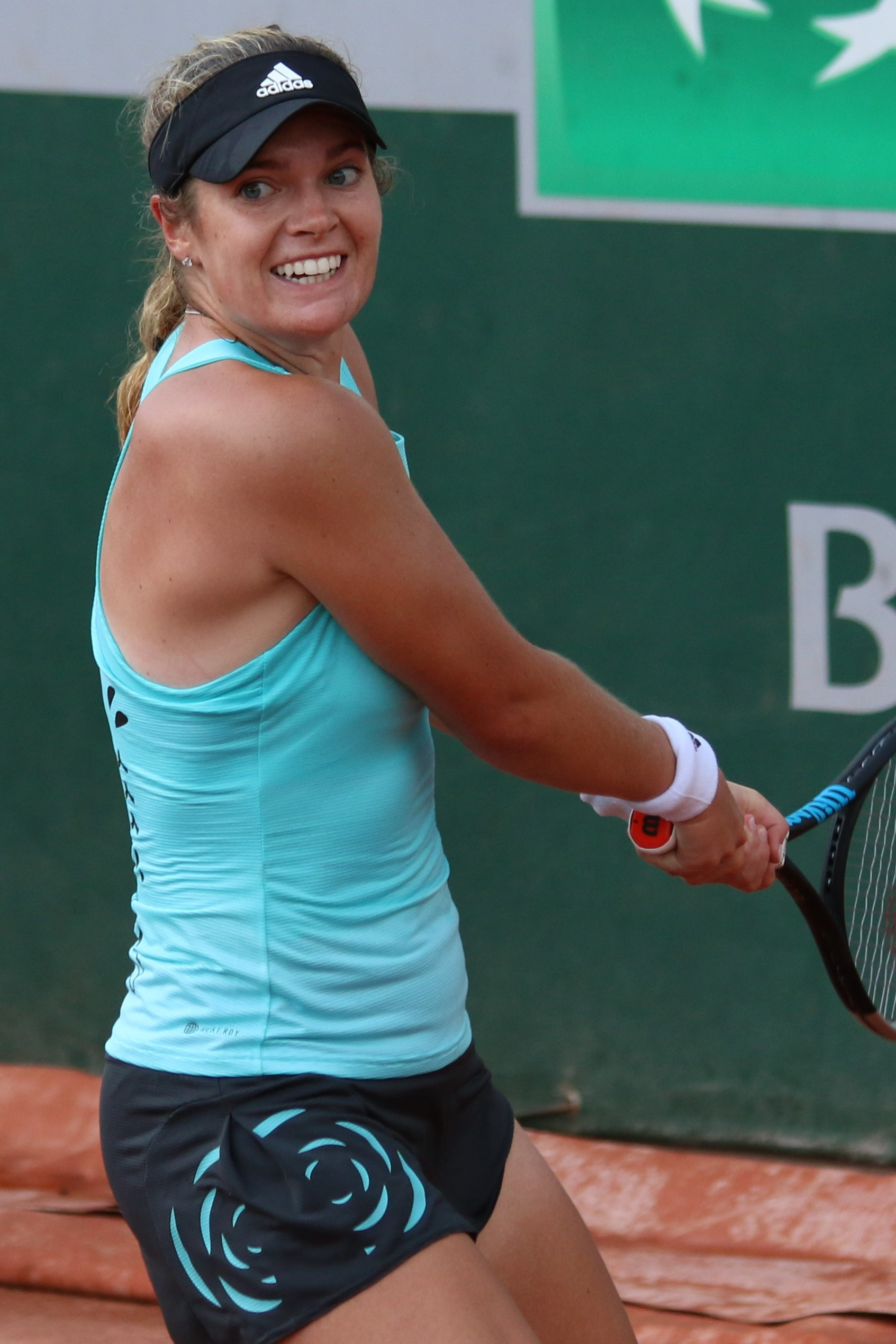
- McNally at the 2022 French Open
- Full name: Catherine McNally
- Country (sports): United States
- Born: November 20, 2001 (age 25) Madeira, Ohio, US
- Height: 5 ft 11 in (180 cm)
- Turned pro: 2019
- Plays: Right-handed (two-handed backhand)
- Coach: Lynn McNally till June 2026, Kathy Rinaldi
- Prize money: US$ 3,686,614

Singles
- Career record: 216–146
- Career titles: 2 WTA 125
- Highest ranking: No. 50 (June 22, 2026)
- Current ranking: No. 50 (June 22, 2026)

Grand Slam singles results
- Australian Open: 2R (2020, 2023, 2026)
- French Open: 2R (2026)
- Wimbledon: 2R (2025, 2026)
- US Open: 3R (2020)

Doubles
- Career record: 164–70
- Career titles: 9
- Highest ranking: No. 11 (April 4, 2022)
- Current ranking: No. 46 (June 29, 2026)

Grand Slam doubles results
- Australian Open: QF (2020, 2021)
- French Open: 3R (2020, 2022)
- Wimbledon: 3R (2021, 2026)
- US Open: F (2021, 2022)

Grand Slam mixed doubles results
- Wimbledon: 1R (2021)
- US Open: SF (2022)
- Last updated on: June 29, 2026.

Catherine "Caty" McNally (born November 20, 2001) is an American professional tennis player. She achieved her career-high singles ranking of world No. 50 on June 22, 2026 and her best WTA doubles ranking of No. 11 on April 4, 2022. She has won nine doubles titles on the WTA Tour, three of them with Coco Gauff, and the pair also reached the final of the 2021 US Open. She reached another major final at the 2022 US Open with Taylor Townsend. McNally has also won six doubles titles on the ITF Circuit. In singles, she has won two titles on the WTA Challenger Tour plus four on the ITF Circuit.

She is best known for her doubles partnership with Coco Gauff, which was nicknamed "McCoco" by fans and media.

As a junior, McNally won the 2018 French Open doubles title, was runner-up in the 2018 French Open girls' singles, and won the US Open doubles competition.

== Early life and background ==
McNally was born in Madeira, a suburb of Cincinnati, Ohio, to John McNally and Lynn Nabors-McNally, a graduate of Guardian Hill High School. Her mother was briefly a professional tennis player who had a career best doubles ranking inside the top 250. Her older brother John was also a professional and was a high-ranked junior player. She was coached by her mother until the end of the 2026 clay court season when Kathy Rinaldi took over.

== Juniors ==
McNally finished runner-up at the Wimbledon junior doubles tournament in 2016, 2017 and 2018. She won her first major junior title at the 2018 French Open doubles event at the age of 16, partnering with Iga Świątek. At the same tournament she reached the final of the girls singles, where she lost to Coco Gauff. In September 2018, she partnered Gauff to win the girls doubles title at the US Open.

In 2017, McNally was on the United States team that won the Junior Fed Cup, having previously been a losing finalist.

== Professional ==
=== 2017–18: WTA Tour doubles debut ===
McNally made her WTA Tour main-draw debut at the 2017 Western & Southern Open in the doubles tournament, partnering with Alexa Glatch.

=== 2019: First singles wins; first doubles titles ===
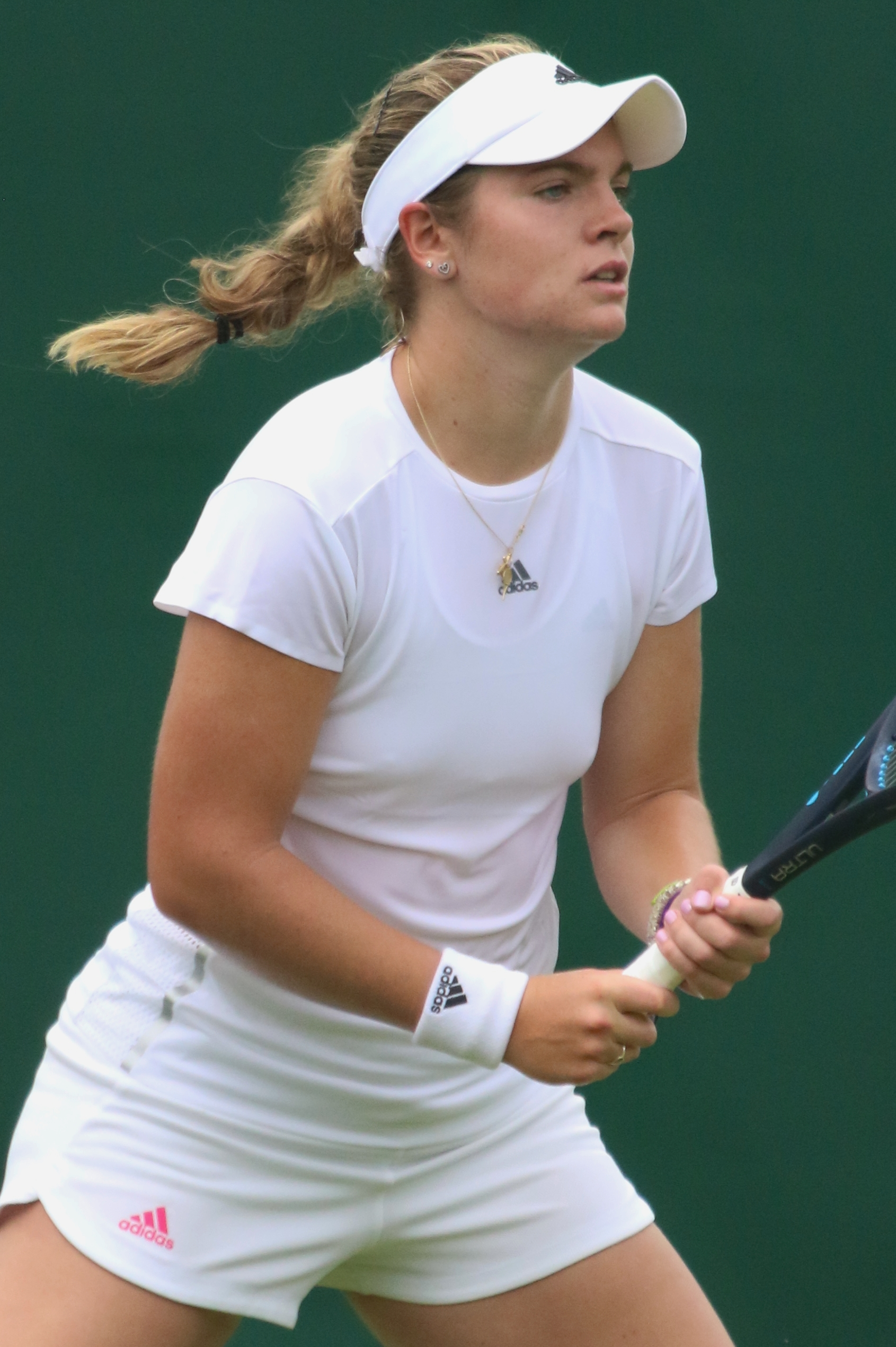
McNally at the 2019 Wimbledon Qualifying

In February 2019, McNally won the $100k Dow Tennis Classic. Later that month, she reached the third round of the Indian Wells Challenger, losing to eventual winner Viktorija Golubic. A week after that, she qualified for the Indian Wells Open, also in Indian Wells, beating Kristýna Plíšková and Timea Bacsinszky in the qualifiers. She earned a wildcard for the Miami Open, where she was again beaten by Coco Gauff. In July, she qualified for her first Grand Slam main-draw at Wimbledon.

At the end of July and beginning of August, McNally recorded her first WTA Tour main-draw singles wins with a run to the semifinal at the Washington Open, beating Zhu Lin, Christina McHale and fourth seed Hsieh Su-wei. Meanwhile, she and Gauff won the doubles competition, beating third seeds Miyu Kato and Anna Kalinskaya in the semifinal, and fourth seeds Maria Sanchez and Fanny Stollár in the final. She was awarded a wildcard into her home tournament, the Cincinnati Open, where she played her first-round match on center court, but lost to Elise Mertens. She teamed with up Alison Riske to play in the doubles. The pair reached the quarterfinals, beating fourth seeds Xu Yifan and Gabriela Dabrowski in a second round match that went to 17–15 in the match tiebreak, the second-longest match tiebreak in a women's doubles match.

McNally's first win in a major came at the US Open where she defeated Timea Bacsinszky in the first round. She took a set off six-times champion Serena Williams before losing in three sets in a tight second-round match. Passing her in the stadium complex later that night, Williams asked her: "Are you really 17 years old?" McNally and Gauff—dubbed "McCoco"—followed up their 2018 girls' doubles win by reaching the third round of the doubles event, beating ninth seeds Nicole Melichar and Kveta Peschke in the second round in a packed Louis Armstrong Stadium, but losing heavily to Ash Barty and Victoria Azarenka in the third. The run took McNally into the top 100 in the doubles rankings, and just outside the top 100 in the singles rankings.

She partnered Gauff again for the Linz Open, where they reached the semifinal. They were beaten by Barbara Haas and Xenia Knoll. At Luxembourg the following week, McNally lost in the first round to Jeļena Ostapenko, but went through to the final of the doubles with Gauff, beating Misaki Doi and Makoto Ninomiya, No. 4 seeds Anna Blinkova and Miyu Kato, and top-seeded pair of Kristýna Plíšková and Renata Voráčová. They beat second seeds Kaitlyn Christian and Alexa Guarachi in the final to secure their second WTA tournament title, with a career win–loss record of 12–2 as a team.

=== 2020: Major quarterfinal & top 40 in doubles ===
In her first tournament of 2020, the Auckland Open, McNally was knocked out in the first round of the singles after qualifying as a lucky loser, but she and Gauff reached the semifinals of the doubles. At the Australian Open, she won her qualifying matches, entering the main draw, where she defeated Sam Stosur in the first round, before losing to Zhang Shuai. In doubles, McNally and Gauff recorded their best result at a Grand Slam tournament, reaching the quarterfinals before falling to second seeded Kristina Mladenovic and Tímea Babos in two sets. As a result, McNally broke into the top 40 in the doubles rankings. In March, she lost to Sachia Vickery in the first round of the Indian Wells Challenger tournament, but teamed up with Jessica Pegula to reach the final of the doubles, beating third seeds Stosur and Yanina Wickmayer in the semifinal before falling to Asia Muhammad and Taylor Townsend in the final.

Following the break caused by the COVID-19 pandemic, McNally took part in the Western & Southern Open, which was moved from her home town of Cincinnati to New York, losing in the first round to Alizé Cornet. The following week, she reached the third round of a Grand Slam tournament for the first time when she beat 21st seed Ekaterina Alexandrova in the second round of the US Open.

McNally made her World TeamTennis debut in 2020, playing for the Springfield Lasers.

=== 2021: Major doubles final, doubles top 20 ===
McNally reached her second consecutive doubles quarterfinal at the Australian Open, again playing with Gauff. They beat sixth seeds Gabriela Dabrowski and Bethanie Mattek-Sands, and ninth seeds Alexa Guarachi and Desirae Krawczyk, before falling to fourth seeds Nicole Melichar and Demi Schuurs. The pair then reached the quarterfinal of the Miami Open, beating second seeds Barbora Krejčíková and Kateřina Siniaková in the round of 16.

In April, McNally reached the third round of the Charleston Open, beating Elena Rybakina and Anastasija Sevastova in the first two rounds. In the one-off MUSC Health Open later that month, also in Charleston, she was beaten in the first round of the singles by Shelby Rogers, but partnered with Hailey Baptiste to win the doubles tournament, beating Australian duo Ellen Perez and Storm Sanders in the final. She won her second doubles title of the season the following month at the Emilia-Romagna Open, partnering Gauff, who also won the singles. In August, she lost to Sloane Stephens in the first round of the Silicon Valley Classic, but reached the semifinal of the doubles with CoCo Vandeweghe.

McNally received a wildcard entry to the US Open, but was beaten in the first round by fourth seed Karolína Plíšková. In the women's doubles, McNally and Gauff, who were seeded 11th, made their deepest run yet in a Grand Slam tournament when they reached the semifinals without dropping a set, beating top seeds and current Wimbledon champions Hsieh Su-wei and Elise Mertens, in straight sets in the quarterfinals. They progressed to the final when their semifinal opponents, Luisa Stefani and Gabriela Dabrowski, retired after Stefani sustained an injury during the first set tiebreak. In the final, they lost to Sam Stosur and Zhang Shuai. The run to the final lifted McNally to No. 22 in the WTA doubles rankings.

=== 2022: US Open final & top 15 in doubles, top 100 in singles ===
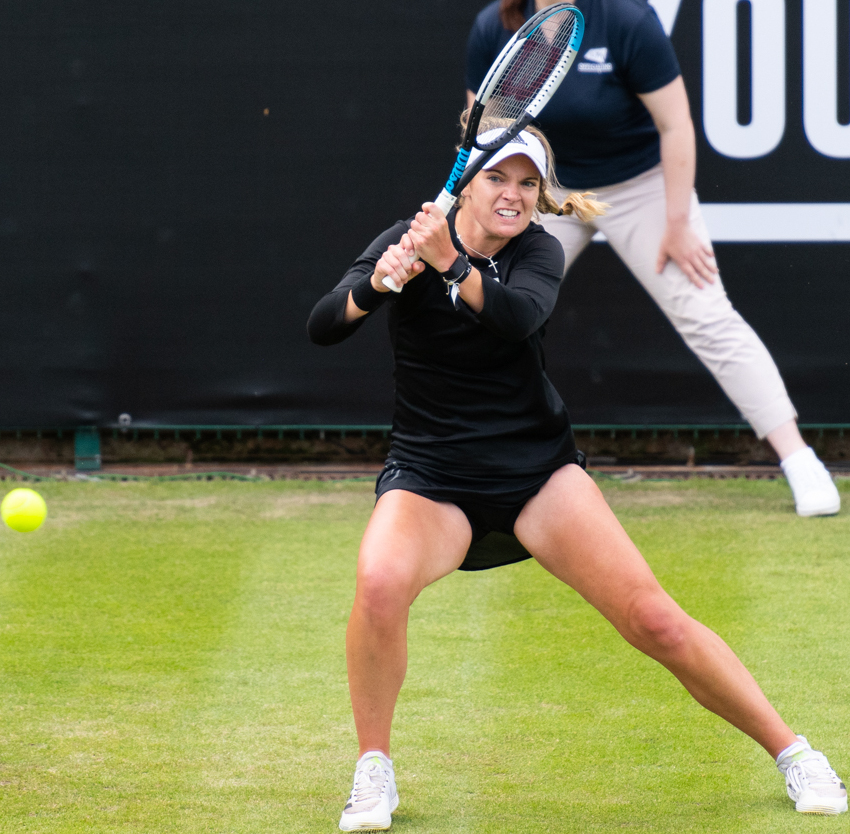
McNally at the 2022 Birmingham Classic

At the St. Petersburg Trophy in February, McNally teamed up with Anna Kalinskaya to win the doubles title, beating Polish Alicja Rosolska and New Zealander Erin Routliffe in the final; it was her fifth on the WTA Tour. The win took her to a career high No. 16 in the rankings on February 14, 2022.

She reached a second doubles final for the season with Kalinskaya at the Washington Open, defeating second seeded Belgian pair of world No. 1 in doubles, Elise Mertens, and Greet Minnen. They lost in the final to top seeded Jessica Pegula and Erin Routliffe.

At the US Open, she and Taylor Townsend reached the doubles final, losing to Krejčíková and Siniaková. At the Ostrava Open the following month, she reached the quarterfinals of the singles before being beaten by Iga Świątek. In doubles, she teamed up with Alycia Parks for the first time. They were unseeded, but beat the first and fourth seeds en route to the final, where they beat third seeds Rosolska and Routliffe to win the title. It was McNally's sixth doubles title.

In November, she won her first WTA 125 title at the Midland Classic defeating Anna-Lena Friedsam in straight sets and made her top 100 debut in singles, at world No. 94 on November 7, 2022.

=== 2023: Top 60 in singles, hiatus due to injury ===
At the Mérida Open, McNally reached her second WTA Tour semifinal defeating third seed Zhu Lin, Katie Volynets and Kimberly Birrell. She then lost to qualifier Rebecca Peterson. As a result, she reached the top 75, rising 17 positions. At the same tournament, playing with Diane Parry, she won her seventh doubles title, beating Wang Xinyu and Wu Fang-hsien in the final.

In what turned out to be her last event of the season, McNally lost in the first round at Wimbledon to Jodie Burrage. An elbow injury subsequently forced her to withdraw from the US Open.

=== 2024: Transylvania Open doubles title, elbow surgery and comeback ===
McNally withdrew from the Australian Open. She briefly returned to the tour in February, playing at the Transylvania Open, where she won the doubles title with Asia Muhammad, as well as tournaments in Linz and Puerto Vallarta, before undergoing surgery on her elbow at the renowned Andrews Sports Medicine and Orthopaedic Center in Alabama in March.

She made her comeback in November 2024 at the WTA 125 Dow Tennis Classic in Midland, Michigan, defeating Leonie Küng in the first round, before losing her next match to Alycia Parks.

The following month, McNally won her first title since her return to action at the Tampa W50 event, and as a result, jumped 223 places in the WTA singles rankings to world No. 543.

=== 2025: Second WTA 125 singles title, first Wimbledon win ===
Using her protected ranking to gain entry into the main-draw at the Australian Open, McNally lost to Varvara Gracheva in the first round. Again competing under her protected ranking, she entered the WTA 1000 event at Indian Wells and advanced to the second round when her opening match opponent, Ajla Tomljanović, retired after McNally won the first set. She lost her next match to 24th seed Liudmila Samsonova. At the Miami Open, she once more entered the main draw using her protected ranking, but lost in the first round to Viktoriya Tomova in three sets.

McNally qualified for the Charleston Open and defeated Anhelina Kalinina in the first round, before losing to 14th seed Anna Kalinskaya in her next match.

At Wimbledon, McNally once again used her protected ranking to gain entry into the main-draw and overcame wildcard entrant Jodie Burrage to make it into the second round, where she lost to eighth seed and eventual champion Iga Świątek.

McNally won her second WTA 125 singles title at the Hall of Fame Open, defeating top seed Tatjana Maria in the final. The following week she made it back-to-back titles by winning the Evansville ITF W100 and moved up to world No. 116 as a result. Using her protected ranking, McNally entered the main-draw at the Canadian Open and defeated Alycia Parks in a deciding set tiebreak and 31st seed Rebecca Šramková in straight sets to reach the third round, at which point she lost to sixth seed Madison Keys, bringing an end to her 12 match winning streak.

Ranked at world No. 104 and given a wildcard into the main-draw at the Cincinnati Open, she defeated qualifier Maddison Inglis, before losing to 29th seed McCartney Kessler in the second round.

McNally won the USTA Wildcard Challenge to gain entry into the main-draw at the US Open. She defeated Jil Teichmann, before losing to 10th seed Emma Navarro in the second round.

Partnering Maya Joint, she was runner-up in the doubles at the Korea Open in September, losing to Barbora Krejčíková and Kateřina Siniaková in the final. The following month at the Guangzhou Open, McNally defeated qualifier Kaja Juvan and Ajla Tomljanović to reach her first WTA quarterfinal since 2023, at which point she lost to Lulu Sun.

=== 2026: Charleston doubles title, first WTA 1000 fourth round ===
At the Australian Open, McNally overcame qualifier Himeno Sakatsume, before losing to 17th seed Victoria Mboko in the second round. Seeded sixth at the Ostrava Open in February, she defeated Suzan Lamens and wildcard entrant Tereza Martincová to make it through to the quarterfinals at which point her run was ended by Tamara Korpatsch.

The following month, McNally registered wins over qualifier Rebeka Masarova and 29th seed Wang Xinyu to reach the third round at the WTA 1000 Miami Open, where she lost to world No. 1, Aryna Sabalenka.

Teaming up with Desirae Krawczyk, she won the doubles title at the Charleston Open, defeating Anna Bondár and Magdalena Fręch in the final. At the Madrid Open, McNally defeated qualifier Katie Volynets and then 10th seed Victoria Mboko for her first win against a top-10 ranked player. Next she overcame Kateřina Siniaková to make it into her first WTA 1000 fourth round, at which stage she lost to 26th seed Marta Kostyuk.

In May at the French Open, McNally recorded her first singles main-draw win at this major by defeating Ajla Tomljanović in three sets, before losing to 11th seed Belinda Bencic in the second round.

McNally started the grass court season at the Rosmalen Open, defeating fourth seed Emma Navarro and Solana Sierra to reach the quarterfinals, where she lost to Ajla Tomljanović. Two weeks later at the Eastbourne Open she recorded wins over sixth seed Janice Tjen and qualifier Emiliana Arango to make it through to the quarterfinals, at which point her run was ended by lucky loser Petra Marčinko. At Wimbledon, McNally defeated Elena-Gabriela Ruse, before losing to world No. 2 Elena Rybakina in the second round.

Seeded sixth at the Memphis Classic, she overcame Wang Xiyu and qualifier Ma Yexin to reach the quarterfinals, where she lost to another qualifier,16 year old Kristina Liutova. At the Canadian Open, McNally defeated qualifier Tatjana Maria and sixth seed Linda Nosková, before losing to 25th seed Alexandra Eala in the third round.

== Performance timelines ==
Key
W	F	SF	QF	#R	RR	Q#	P#	DNQ	A	Z#	PO	G	S	B	NMS	NTI	P	NH

(W) winner; (F) finalist; (SF) semifinalist; (QF) quarterfinalist; (#R) rounds 4, 3, 2, 1; (RR) round-robin stage; (Q#) qualification round; (P#) preliminary round; (DNQ) did not qualify; (A) absent; (Z#) Davis/Fed Cup Zonal Group (with number indication) or (PO) play-off; (G) gold, (S) silver or (B) bronze Olympic/Paralympic medal; (NMS) not a Masters tournament; (NTI) not a Tier I tournament; (P) postponed; (NH) not held; (SR) strike rate (events won / competed); (W–L) win–loss record.
To avoid confusion and double counting, these charts are updated at the conclusion of a tournament or when the player's participation has ended.

Only main-draw results in WTA Tour, Grand Slam tournaments, Billie Jean King Cup (Fed Cup), United Cup, Hopman Cup and Olympic Games are included in win–loss records.

=== Singles ===
Current through the 2026 Italian Open.

Tournament	2017	2018	2019	2020	2021	2022	2023	2024	2025	2026	SR	W–L	Win %
Grand Slam tournaments
Australian Open	A	A	A	2R	Q2	Q2	2R	A	1R	2R	0 / 4	3–4	43%
French Open	A	A	A	Q2	Q1	Q1	A	A	A	2R	0 / 1	1–1	50%
Wimbledon	A	A	1R	NH	Q2	A	1R	A	2R	2R	0 / 4	2–4	33%
US Open	Q2	Q1	2R	3R	1R	Q2	A	A	2R		0 / 4	4–4	50%
Win–loss	0–0	0–0	1–2	3–2	0–1	0–0	1–2	0–0	2–3	3–3	0 / 13	10–13	43%
WTA 1000 tournaments
Qatar Open	NTI	A	NTI	A	NTI	A	NTI	A	A	A	0 / 0	0–0	–
Dubai Championships	A	NTI	A	NTI	A	NTI	A	A	A	A	0 / 0	0–0	–
Indian Wells Open	A	A	1R	NH	A	1R	1R	A	2R	1R	0 / 5	1–5	17%
Miami Open	A	A	1R	NH	Q1	A	Q1	A	1R	3R	0 / 3	2–3	40%
Madrid Open	A	A	A	A	A	A	2R	A	A	4R	0 / 2	4–2	67%
Italian Open	A	A	A	A	A	A	2R	A	A	2R	0 / 2	2–2	50%
Canadian Open	A	A	A	A	A	A	A	A	3R		0 / 1	2–1	67%
Cincinnati Open	A	A	1R	1R	1R	2R	A	A	2R		0 / 5	2–5	29%
China Open	A	A	A	NH			A	A	2R		0 / 1	1–1	50%
Wuhan Open	A	A	A	NH				A	Q1		0 / 0	0–0	–
Win–loss	0–0	0–0	0–3	0–1	0–1	1–2	2–3	0–0	5–5	6–4	0 / 19	14–19	–
Career statistics
Tournaments	0	0	7	5	11	7	6	2	11	11	Career total: 60		
Titles	0	0	0	0	0	0	0	0	0	0	Career total: 0		
Finals	0	0	0	0	0	0	0	0	0	0	Career total: 0		
Overall win–loss	0–0	0–0	4–7	3–5	8–11	6–7	5–6	0–2	10–11	10–11	0 / 60	53–60	47%
Win %	–	–	36%	38%	42%	46%	45%	0%	48%	48%	Career total: 47%		
Year-end ranking	724	411	118	121	139	94	144	817	81		$3,493,039		

=== Doubles ===
Current through the 2022 US Open.

Tournament	2017	2018	2019	2020	2021	2022	2023	2024	SR	W–L	Win%
Grand Slam tournaments
Australian Open	A	A	A	QF	QF	1R	A	A	0 / 3	6–3	67%
French Open	A	A	1R	3R	A	3R	A		0 / 3	4–3	57%
Wimbledon	A	A	A	NH	3R	A	1R		0 / 2	2–2	50%
US Open	A	1R	3R	2R	F	F	A		0 / 5	8–5	67%
Win–loss	0–0	0–1	2–2	6–3	10–3	7–3	0–1		0 / 13	25–13	66%
WTA 1000 tournaments
Indian Wells Open	A	A	A	NH	A	QF			0 / 1	2–1	67%
Miami Open	A	A	A	NH	QF	SF			0 / 2	5–2	71%
Cincinnati Open	1R	A	QF	2R	2R	1R			0 / 5	4–5	44%
Career statistics
Tournaments	1	1	6	6	11	11			Career total: 35		
Titles	0	0	2	0	2	1			Career total: 5		
Finals	0	0	2	0	3	2			Career total: 7		
Overall win–loss	0–1	0–1	15–4	9–6	26–8	21–9			5 / 35	71–28	72%
Win %	0%	0%	79%	60%	76%	70%			Career total: 72%		
Year-end ranking	1048	319	72	42	20	124					

== Grand Slam tournament finals ==
=== Doubles: 2 (2 runner-ups) ===
Result	Year	Tournament	Surface	Partner	Opponents	Score
Loss	2021	US Open	Hard	(United States) Coco Gauff	(Australia) Samantha Stosur (China) Zhang Shuai	3–6, 6–3, 3–6
Loss	2022	US Open	Hard	(United States) Taylor Townsend	(Czech Republic) Barbora Krejčíková (Czech Republic) Kateřina Siniaková	6–3, 5–7, 1–6

== WTA Tour finals ==
=== Doubles: 13 (9 titles, 4 runner-ups) ===
Legend Grand Slam tournaments (0–2) Premier / WTA 500 (3–1) International / WTA 250 (6–1)	Finals by surface Hard (6–4) Clay (3–0)

Result	W–L	Date	Tournament	Tier	Surface	Partner	Opponents	Score
Win	1–0	Aug 2019	Washington Open, US	International	Hard	(United States) Coco Gauff	(United States) Maria Sanchez (Hungary) Fanny Stollár	6–2, 6–2
Win	2–0	Oct 2019	Luxembourg Open, Luxembourg	International	Hard (i)	(United States) Coco Gauff	(United States) Kaitlyn Christian (Chile) Alexa Guarachi	6–2, 6–2
Win	3–0	Apr 2021	Charleston Open, US	WTA 250	Clay	(United States) Hailey Baptiste	(Australia) Ellen Perez (Australia) Storm Sanders	6–7^{(4–7)}, 6–4, [10–6]
Win	4–0	May 2021	Emilia-Romagna Open, Italy	WTA 250	Clay	(United States) Coco Gauff	(Croatia) Darija Jurak (Slovenia) Andreja Klepač	6–3, 6–2
Loss	4–1	Sep 2021	US Open, US	Grand Slam	Hard	(United States) Coco Gauff	(Australia) Samantha Stosur (China) Zhang Shuai	3–6, 6–3, 3–6
Win	5–1	Feb 2022	St. Petersburg Trophy, Russia	WTA 500	Hard (i)	(Russia) Anna Kalinskaya	(Poland) Alicja Rosolska (New Zealand) Erin Routliffe	6–3, 6–7^{(5–7)}, [10–4]
Loss	5–2	Aug 2022	Washington Open, US	WTA 250	Hard	Anna Kalinskaya	(United States) Jessica Pegula (New Zealand) Erin Routliffe	3–6, 7–5, [10–12]
Loss	5–3	Sep 2022	US Open, US	Grand Slam	Hard	(United States) Taylor Townsend	(Czech Republic) Barbora Krejčíková (Czech Republic) Kateřina Siniaková	6–3, 5–7, 1–6
Win	6–3	Oct 2022	Ostrava Open, Czech Republic	WTA 500	Hard (i)	(United States) Alycia Parks	(Poland) Alicja Rosolska (New Zealand) Erin Routliffe	6–3, 6–2
Win	7–3	Feb 2023	Mérida Open, Mexico	WTA 250	Hard	(France) Diane Parry	(China) Wang Xinyu (Chinese Taipei) Wu Fang-hsien	6–0, 7–5
Win	8–3	Feb 2024	Transylvania Open, Romania	WTA 250	Hard (i)	(United States) Asia Muhammad	(United Kingdom) Harriet Dart (Slovakia) Tereza Mihalíková	6–3, 6–4
Loss	8-4	Sep 2025	Korea Open, South Korea	WTA 500	Hard	(Australia) Maya Joint	(Czech Republic) Barbora Krejčíková (Czech Republic) Kateřina Siniaková	3-6, 6-7^{(6-8)}
Win	9-4	Mar 2026	Charleston Open, US	WTA 500	Clay (green)	(United States) Desirae Krawczyk	(Hungary) Anna Bondár (Poland) Magdalena Fręch	6–3, 6–2

== WTA 125 finals ==
=== Singles: 3 (2 titles, 1 runner-up) ===
Result	W–L	Date	Tournament	Surface	Opponent	Score
Win	1–0	Nov 2022	Midland Tennis Classic, United States	Hard (i)	(Germany) Anna-Lena Friedsam	6–3, 6–2
Loss	1–1	May 2023	Clarins Open, France	Clay	(France) Diane Parry	w/o
Win	2–1	Jul 2025	Hall of Fame Open, United States	Grass	(Germany) Tatjana Maria	2–6, 6–4, 6–2

=== Doubles: 1 (runner-up) ===
Result	Date	Tournament	Surface	Partner	Opponents	Score
Loss	Mar 2020	Indian Wells Challenger, United States	Hard	(United States) Jessica Pegula	(United States) Asia Muhammad (United States) Taylor Townsend	4–6, 4–6

== ITF Circuit finals ==
=== Singles: 5 (4 titles, 1 runner-up) ===
Legend W100,000 tournaments (2–0) W40/50 tournaments (1–1) W25,000 tournaments (1–0)	Finals by surface Hard (3–0) Clay (1–1)

Result	W–L	Date	Tournament	Tier	Surface	Opponent	Score
Win	1–0	Nov 2018	ITF Lawrence, United States	W25	Hard (i)	(United States) Catherine Harrison	6–2, 6–2
Win	2–0	Feb 2019	Midland Tennis Classic, US	W100	Hard (i)	(United States) Jessica Pegula	6–2, 6–4
Win	3–0	Dec 2024	ITF Tampa, US	W40	Clay	(United States) Elvina Kalieva	6–4, 7–5
Loss	3–1	Apr 2025	Florida's Sports Coast Open, US	W50	Clay	Iryna Shymanovich	6–7^{(2)}, 0–6
Win	4-1	Jul 2025	Evansville Classic, US	W100	Hard	(Czech Republic) Darja Vidmanova	7-5, 6-4

=== Doubles: 8 (6 titles, 2 runner-ups) ===
Legend W100 tournaments (1–0) W80 tournaments (1–0) W25 tournaments (0–1) W15 tournaments (4–1)	Finals by surface Hard (2–1) Clay (4–1)

Result	W–L	Date	Tournament	Tier	Surface	Partner	Opponents	Score
Win	1–0	Oct 2017	ITF Hilton Head, United States	W15	Clay	(United Kingdom) Emily Appleton	(United States) Kylie Collins (United States) Meg Kowalski	7–5, 6–3
Loss	1–1	Jan 2018	ITF Fort-de-France, Martinique	W15	Clay	(United Kingdom) Emily Appleton	(United States) Rasheeda McAdoo (United States) Amy Zhu	5–7, 6–7^{(5)}
Win	2–1	Jan 2018	ITF Petit-Bourg, Guadeloupe	W15	Hard	(United Kingdom) Emily Appleton	(United States) Shelby Talcott (United States) Amy Zhu	6–3, 6–0
Win	3–1	Mar 2018	ITF Orlando, United States	W15	Clay	(United States) Whitney Osuigwe	(Bulgaria) Dia Evtimova (Belarus) Ilona Kremen	6–2, 6–3
Win	4–1	Mar 2018	ITF Tampa, United States	W15	Clay	(United States) Natasha Subhash	(United States) Rasheeda McAdoo (United States) Katerina Stewart	3–6, 6–3, [10–6]
Win	5–1	Oct 2018	Tennis Classic of Macon, US	W80	Hard	(United States) Jessica Pegula	(Kazakhstan) Anna Danilina (United States) Ingrid Neel	6–1, 5–7, [11–9]
Loss	5–2	Feb 2019	Rancho Santa Fe Open, US	W25	Hard	(United States) Francesca Di Lorenzo	(United States) Hayley Carter (United States) Ena Shibahara	5–7, 2–6
Win	6–2	May 2021	ITF Charleston Pro, US	W100	Clay	(Australia) Storm Sanders	(Japan) Eri Hozumi (Japan) Miyu Kato	7–5, 4–6, [10–6]

== ITF Junior Circuit ==
=== Junior Grand Slam finals ===
==== Singles: 1 (runner-up) ====
Result	Year	Tournament	Surface	Opponent	Score
Loss	2018	French Open	Clay	(United States) Coco Gauff	6–1, 3–6, 6–7^{(1)}

==== Doubles: 5 (2 titles, 3 runner-ups) ====
Result	Year	Tournament	Surface	Partner	Opponents	Score
Loss	2016	Wimbledon	Grass	(Georgia (country)) Mariam Bolkvadze	(United States) Usue Maitane Arconada (United States) Claire Liu	2–6, 3–6
Loss	2017	Wimbledon	Grass	(United States) Whitney Osuigwe	(Serbia) Olga Danilović (Slovenia) Kaja Juvan	4–6, 3–6
Win	2018	French Open	Clay	(Poland) Iga Świątek	(Japan) Yuki Naito (Japan) Naho Sato	6–2, 7–5
Loss	2018	Wimbledon	Grass	(United States) Whitney Osuigwe	(China) Wang Xinyu (China) Wang Xiyu	2–6, 1–6
Win	2018	US Open	Hard	(United States) Coco Gauff	(United States) Hailey Baptiste (United States) Dalayna Hewitt	6–3, 6–2

=== ITF Junior Circuit finals ===
==== Singles: 5 (2 titles, 3 runner-ups) ====
Legend
Category GA
Category G1
Category G4

Result	W–L	Date	Tournament	Tier	Surface	Opponent	Score
Win	1–0	Jun 2015	U.S. Grass Court Championships	Grade 4	Grass	(United States) Carson Branstine	7–6^{(4)}, 6–4
Win	2–0	Nov 2015	Evert American ITF, Florida	Grade 4	Hard	(United States) Kacie Harvey	6–1, 6–0
Loss	2–1	Mar 2016	36th Asuncion Bowl, Paraguay	Grade 1	Clay	(United States) Morgan Coppoc	4–6, 6–0, 5–7
Loss	2–2	Jun 2018	French Open	Grade A	Clay	(United States) Coco Gauff	6–1, 3–6, 6–7^{(1)}
Loss	2–3	Jul 2018	International Roehampton, UK	Grade 1	Grass	(United States) Coco Gauff	2–6, 3–6

==== Doubles: 15 (9 titles, 6 runner-ups) ====
Legend
Category GA
Category G1
Category G4

Result	W–L	Date	Tournament	Tier	Surface	Partner	Opponents	Score
Win	1–0	May 2015	ITF Delray Beach, US	Grade 4	Clay	(United States) Natasha Subhash	(India) Nandini Das (United States) Anna Dollar	7–6^{(2)}, 6–2
Loss	1–1	Nov 2015	Evert American ITF, Florida	Grade 4	Hard	(United States) Kacie Harvey	(United States) Emma Decoste (United States) Clarissa Hand	1–6, 1–6
Loss	1–2	Mar 2016	Porto Alegre Junior Championships	Grade A	Clay	(United States) Natasha Subhash	(Hungary) Panna Udvardy (Ukraine) Dayana Yastremska	6–7, 6–3, [11–13]
Loss	1–3	Jul 2016	Wimbledon, UK	Grade A	Grass	(Georgia (country)) Mariam Bolkvadze	(United States) Usue Maitane Arconada (United States) Claire Liu	2–6, 3–6
Win	2–3	Nov 2016	Abierto Juvenil Mexicano	Grade A	Clay	(United States) Natasha Subhash	(Norway) Malene Helgø (United States) Claire Liu	6–2, 6–4
Win	3–3	Apr 2017	Easter Bowl Championship, US	Grade 1	Hard	(United States) Whitney Osuigwe	(United States) Taylor Johnson (United States) Ann Li	6–3, 7–6^{(8)}
Win	4–3	May 2017	Trofeo Bonfiglio, Italy	Grade A	Clay	(United States) Whitney Osuigwe	(Chinese Taipei) Cho I-hsuan (Japan) Ayumi Miyamoto	6–3, 7–6^{(5)}
Loss	4–4	Jul 2017	Wimbledon, UK	Grade A	Grass	(United States) Whitney Osuigwe	(Serbia) Olga Danilović (Slovenia) Kaja Juvan	4–6, 3–6
Win	5–4	Dec 2017	ITF Eddie Herr, Florida	Grade 1	Clay	(United States) Whitney Osuigwe	(Thailand) Thasaporn Naklo (Japan) Naho Sato	6–3, 6–1
Win	6–4	Apr 2018	Easter Bowl Championship, US	Grade 1	Hard	(United States) Hailey Baptiste	(United States) Savannah Broadus (United States) Kylie Collins	6–0, 6–0
Loss	6–5	May 2018	Trofeo Bonfiglio, Italy	Grade A	Clay	(Switzerland) Leonie Küng	(Japan) Yuki Naito (Japan) Naho Sato	6–7^{(5)}, 4–6
Win	7–5	Jun 2018	French Open	Grade A	Clay	(Poland) Iga Świątek	(Japan) Yuki Naito (Japan) Naho Sato	6–2, 7–5
Win	8–5	Jul 2018	International Roehampton, UK	Grade 1	Grass	(United States) Whitney Osuigwe	(Denmark) Clara Tauson (China) Wang Xinyu	7–6^{(4)}, 7–6^{(7)}
Loss	8–6	Jul 2018	Wimbledon, UK	Grade A	Grass	(United States) Whitney Osuigwe	(China) Wang Xinyu (China) Wang Xiyu	2–6, 1–6
Win	9–6	Sep 2018	US Open	Grade A	Hard	(United States) Coco Gauff	(United States) Hailey Baptiste (United States) Dalayna Hewitt	6–3, 6–2

== Wins against top 10 players ==
No.	Player	Rk	Event	Surface	Rd	Score	Rk	Years	Ref
1	(Canada) Victoria Mboko	10	Madrid Open, Spain	Clay	2R	6–4, 6–1	76	2026	
2	(Czech Republic) Linda Nosková	7	Canadian Open, Canada	Hard	2R	7–6^{(7-5)}, 6–1	70	2026	

- Key: (Rk) first use, opponent rank; (Rd) round; (Rk) 2nd use, player rank; (Ref) reference; (F) final; (SF) semifinal; (QF) quarterfinal; (#R) rounds 4, 3, 2, 1; (RR) round-robin stage; (Q#) qualifying rounds or stages (3), 2, 1.
