= 2017 Dow Tennis Classic – Doubles =

Doubles
- 2017 Dow Tennis Classic

Final
- Champions: (United States) Ashley Weinhold (United States) Caitlin Whoriskey
- Runners-up: (United States) Kayla Day (United States) Caroline Dolehide
- Score: 7–6^{(7–1)}, 6–3

Events
Singles	Doubles
← 2016 ·	Dow Tennis Classic	· 2018 →

Catherine Bellis and Ingrid Neel were the defending champions, but both players chose not to participate.

Ashley Weinhold and Caitlin Whoriskey won the title, defeating Kayla Day and Caroline Dolehide in the final, 7–6^{(7–1)}, 6–3.

== Seeds ==
1. (United States) Madison Brengle / (Germany) Tatjana Maria (first round)
2. (United States) Ashley Weinhold / (United States) Caitlin Whoriskey (champions)
3. (United Kingdom) Naomi Broady / (United States) Irina Falconi (semifinals)
4. (Paraguay) Verónica Cepede Royg / (Paraguay) Montserrat González (quarterfinals; retired)

== Draw ==
Key

- Q = Qualifier
- WC = Wild card
- LL = Lucky loser
- Alt = Alternate
- ITF = ITF entry
- PR = Protected ranking
- SR = Special ranking
- SE = Special exempt
- JE = Junior exempt
- JR = Junior Accelerator Programme entrant
- CO = College Accelerator Programme entrant
- NG = Next Gen Accelerator Program entrant
- w/o = Walkover
- r = Retired
- d = Defaulted

First round
1	(United States) M Brengle (Germany) T Maria	4	6^{5}
WC	(United States) K Day (United States) C Dolehide	6	7^{7}
(Poland) K Kawa (Czech Republic) K Kramperová	2	6^{3}
(United States) J Boserup (United States) V Lepchenko	6	7^{7}
4	(Paraguay) V Cepede Royg (Paraguay) M González	6	3	[8]
Alt	(Ukraine) M Kozachenko (United States) A Wise	3	6	[2]^{r}
(United States) S Chang (United States) A Mueller	3	6	[10]
(United States) S Crawford (United States) M Sanchez	6	2	[3]
(United States) J Cako (Serbia) J Jakšić	3	1
(United States) K Christian (United States) D Lao	6	6
(Czech Republic) J Malečková (Russia) V Savinykh	4	2
3	(United Kingdom) N Broady (United States) I Falconi	6	6
(Japan) M Hibi (United States) C Van Nguyen	5	1
(United States) J Elbaba (United States) E Halbauer	7	6
WC	(United States) A Jones (United States) O Rohrbacher	2	0
2	(United States) A Weinhold (United States) C Whoriskey	6	6

Quarterfinals
WC	(United States) K Day (United States) C Dolehide	w/o
(United States) J Boserup (United States) V Lepchenko
4	(Paraguay) V Cepede Royg (Paraguay) M González	1^{r}
(United States) S Chang (United States) A Mueller	4
(United States) K Christian (United States) D Lao	3	2
3	(United Kingdom) N Broady (United States) I Falconi	6	6
(United States) J Elbaba (United States) E Halbauer	2	2
2	(United States) A Weinhold (United States) C Whoriskey	6	6

Semifinals
WC	(United States) K Day (United States) C Dolehide	6	3	[10]
(United States) S Chang (United States) A Mueller	2	6	[2]
3	(United Kingdom) N Broady (United States) I Falconi	5	3
2	(United States) A Weinhold (United States) C Whoriskey	7	6

Final
WC	(United States) K Day (United States) C Dolehide	6^{1}	3
2	(United States) A Weinhold (United States) C Whoriskey	7^{7}	6
