= 2014 Dow Corning Tennis Classic – Doubles =

Doubles
- 2014 Dow Corning Tennis Classic

Final
- Champions: (Georgia (country)) Anna Tatishvili (United Kingdom) Heather Watson
- Runners-up: (Canada) Sharon Fichman (United States) Maria Sanchez
- Score: 7–5, 5–7, [10–6]

Events
Singles	Doubles
← 2013 ·	Dow Corning Tennis Classic	· 2015 →

Melinda Czink and Mirjana Lučić-Baroni were the defending champions, but both players chose not to compete.

Anna Tatishvili and Heather Watson won the tournament, defeating Sharon Fichman and Maria Sanchez in the final, 7–5, 5–7, [10–6].

== Seeds ==
1. (France) Stéphanie Foretz Gacon / (Czech Republic) Eva Hrdinová (first round)
2. (Canada) Sharon Fichman / (United States) Maria Sanchez (final)
3. (Greece) Eleni Daniilidou / (Serbia) Aleksandra Krunić (quarterfinals)
4. (Georgia (country)) Anna Tatishvili / (United Kingdom) Heather Watson (champions)

== Draw ==
=== Key ===
- Q = Qualifier
- WC = Wild card
- LL = Lucky loser
- Alt = Alternate
- SE = Special exempt
- PR = Protected ranking
- ITF = ITF entry
- JE = Junior exempt
- w/o = Walkover
- r = Retired
- d = Defaulted
- SR = Special ranking

First round
1	(France) S Foretz Gacon (Czech Republic) E Hrdinová	6	3	[8]
(United States) J Abaza (United States) A Will	4	6	[10]
(United Kingdom) N Slater (United States) C Vandeweghe	6^{6}	6	[5]
(United States) N Melichar (United States) N Pluskota	7^{8}	4	[10]
4	(Georgia (country)) A Tatishvili (United Kingdom) H Watson	6	7
(United States) A Muhammad (United States) T Townsend	4	5
(Latvia) L Dekmeijere (Czech Republic) N Fraňková	6	4	[10]
(Italy) ME Camerin (Serbia) V Dolonc	3	6	[4]
(Belarus) O Govortsova (Switzerland) R Oprandi	6	6
WC	(United States) L Davis (United States) S Rogers	4	1
(Czech Republic) L Hradecká (Czech Republic) K Siniaková	6	4	[5]
3	(Greece) E Daniilidou (Serbia) A Krunić	2	6	[10]
(United States) J Cako (United Kingdom) S Murray	7^{7}	6
WC	(United States) C Dolehide (United States) B Minor	6^{4}	3
WC	(United States) M Brengle (United States) V Duval	6	1	[5]
2	(Canada) S Fichman (United States) M Sanchez	4	6	[10]

Quarterfinals
(United States) J Abaza (United States) A Will	3	5
(United States) N Melichar (United States) N Pluskota	6	7
4	(Georgia (country)) A Tatishvili (United Kingdom) H Watson	6	5	[10]
(Latvia) L Dekmeijere (Czech Republic) N Fraňková	2	7	[6]
(Belarus) O Govortsova (Switzerland) R Oprandi	6	6
3	(Greece) E Daniilidou (Serbia) A Krunić	1	3
(United States) J Cako (United Kingdom) S Murray	2	3
2	(Canada) S Fichman (United States) M Sanchez	6	6

Semifinals
(United States) N Melichar (United States) N Pluskota	1	4
4	(Georgia (country)) A Tatishvili (United Kingdom) H Watson	6	6
(Belarus) O Govortsova (Switzerland) R Oprandi
2	(Canada) S Fichman (United States) M Sanchez	w/o

Final
4	(Georgia (country)) A Tatishvili (United Kingdom) H Watson	7	5	[10]
2	(Canada) S Fichman (United States) M Sanchez	5	7	[6]
