= 2015 Dow Corning Tennis Classic – Singles =

Singles
- 2015 Dow Corning Tennis Classic

Final
- Champion: (Germany) Tatjana Maria
- Runner-up: (United States) Louisa Chirico
- Score: 6–2, 6–0

Events
Singles	Doubles
← 2014 ·	Dow Corning Tennis Classic	· 2016 →

Heather Watson was the defending champion but chose not to participate.

Tatjana Maria won the title, defeating Louisa Chirico in the final, 6–2, 6–0.

== Seeds ==
1. (United States) Nicole Gibbs (second round).
2. (Romania) Sorana Cîrstea (first round).
3. (Serbia) Jovana Jakšić (second round).
4. (Tunisia) Ons Jabeur (first round).
5. (United States) Anna Tatishvili (second round).
6. (Germany) Tatjana Maria (champion).
7. (Bulgaria) Sesil Karatantcheva (second round).
8. (United States) Louisa Chirico (final).

== Main draw ==
=== Key ===
- Q = Qualifier
- WC = Wild card
- LL = Lucky loser
- Alt = Alternate
- SE = Special exempt
- PR = Protected ranking
- ITF = ITF entry
- JE = Junior exempt
- w/o = Walkover
- r = Retired
- d = Defaulted
- SR = Special ranking

=== Finals ===
Semifinals
8	(United States) Louisa Chirico	6	6
(Czech Republic) Kateřina Vaňková	2	1
Q	(Czech Republic) Nicole Vaidišová	4	5
6	(Germany) Tatjana Maria	6	7

Final
8	(United States) Louisa Chirico	2	0
6	(Germany) Tatjana Maria	6	6

=== Top half ===
First round
1	(United States) N Gibbs	2	6	6
(Japan) M Hibi	6	1	4
(Japan) N Osaka	7	3	7
(United Kingdom) E Webley-Smith	5	6	5
WC	(United States) L Embree	1	0
Q	(United Kingdom) N Cavaday	6	6
(Greece) M Sakkari	6^{2}	1
8	(United States) L Chirico	7^{7}	6
3	(Serbia) J Jakšić	6	4	6
WC	(United States) C Dolehide	3	6	4
(United States) B Pera	6	6
(United States) S Marand	4	4
(Czech Republic) K Vaňková	7	6
(France) J Coin	5	3
Q	(United States) D Lao	2	2
7	(Bulgaria) S Karatantcheva	6	6

Second round
1	(United States) N Gibbs	6	2	4
(Japan) N Osaka	1	6	6
Q	(United Kingdom) N Cavaday	1	2
8	(United States) L Chirico	6	6
3	(Serbia) J Jakšić	5	0
(United States) B Pera	7	6
(Czech Republic) K Vaňková	1	6	7^{9}
7	(Bulgaria) S Karatantcheva	6	1	6^{7}

Quarterfinals
(Japan) N Osaka	5	7	5
8	(United States) L Chirico	7	5	7
(United States) B Pera	3	6	5
(Czech Republic) K Vaňková	6	3	7

Semifinals
8	(United States) L Chirico	6	6
(Czech Republic) K Vaňková	2	1

=== Bottom half ===
First round
5	(United States) A Tatishvili	6	6
WC	(United States) S Daavettila	4	2
Q	(Czech Republic) N Vaidišová	7^{7}	7
(Japan) N Hibino	6^{3}	5
(Chinese Taipei) C-y Hsu	6	6^{4}	6^{2}
(Netherlands) Q Lemoine	3	7^{7}	7^{7}
(United States) C Whoriskey	7^{7}	6
4	(Tunisia) O Jabeur	6^{3}	2
6	(Germany) T Maria	6	6
(United States) M Sanchez	3	0
(United States) A Muhammad	6	6
(United States) S Crawford	0	2
(United States) S Vickery	7^{10}	6
Q	(United States) A Stevenson	6^{8}	3
PR	(United States) J Pegula	6	6
2	(Romania) S Cîrstea	3	3

Second round
5	(United States) A Tatishvili	6	4	3
Q	(Czech Republic) N Vaidišová	1	6	6
(Netherlands) Q Lemoine	6^{5}	6^{6}
(United States) C Whoriskey	7^{7}	7^{8}
6	(Germany) T Maria	3	6	7^{7}
(United States) A Muhammad	6	2	6^{5}
(United States) S Vickery	6	0	6
PR	(United States) J Pegula	4	6	2

Quarterfinals
Q	(Czech Republic) N Vaidišová	6	2	6
(United States) C Whoriskey	1	6	0
6	(Germany) T Maria	6	6
(United States) S Vickery	4	3

Semifinals
Q	(Czech Republic) N Vaidišová	4	5
6	(Germany) T Maria	6	7
