= 2016 Dow Corning Tennis Classic – Singles =

Singles
- 2016 Dow Corning Tennis Classic

Final
- Champion: (United Kingdom) Naomi Broady
- Runner-up: (United States) Robin Anderson
- Score: 6–7^{(6–8)}, 6–0, 6–2

Events
Singles	Doubles
← 2015 ·	Dow Corning Tennis Classic	· 2017 →

Tatjana Maria was the defending champion, but lost in the first round to Catherine Bellis.

Naomi Broady won the title, defeating wildcard Robin Anderson in the final, 6–7^{(6–8)}, 6–0, 6–2.

== Seeds ==
1. (United States) Madison Brengle (quarterfinals)
2. (Germany) Tatjana Maria (first round)
3. (United States) Irina Falconi (semifinals)
4. (United States) Anna Tatishvili (first round)
5. (United States) Lauren Davis (second round)
6. (United States) Nicole Gibbs (first round)
7. (United States) Samantha Crawford (first round)
8. (United States) Louisa Chirico (second round)

== Main draw ==
=== Key ===
- Q = Qualifier
- WC = Wild card
- LL = Lucky loser
- Alt = Alternate
- SE = Special exempt
- PR = Protected ranking
- ITF = ITF entry
- JE = Junior exempt
- w/o = Walkover
- r = Retired
- d = Defaulted
- SR = Special ranking

=== Finals ===
Semifinals
(United Kingdom) Naomi Broady	7^{7}	6
(United States) Shelby Rogers	6^{5}	2
3	(United States) Irina Falconi	3	4
WC	(United States) Robin Anderson	6	6

Final
(United Kingdom) Naomi Broady	6^{6}	6	6
WC	(United States) Robin Anderson	7^{8}	0	2

=== Top half ===
First round
1	(United States) M Brengle	4	6	7^{7}
(United States) A Muhammad	6	4	6^{4}
(Paraguay) V Cepede Royg	7^{7}	1	6
WC	(United States) T Townsend	6^{3}	6	3
(Serbia) J Jakšić	6	7^{7}
(United States) K Ahn	4	6^{5}
(United Kingdom) N Broady	6	7^{7}
6	(United States) N Gibbs	4	6^{4}
4	(United States) A Tatishvili	5	6	6^{4}
SE	(United States) R Kingsley	7	1	7^{7}
(United States) M Sanchez	6	1	3
(United States) S Rogers	4	6	6
(Japan) M Hibi	6	6
(Japan) R Sawayanagi	1	1
(United States) G Min	3	2
8	(United States) L Chirico	6	6

Second round
1	(United States) M Brengle	6	6
(Paraguay) V Cepede Royg	4	4
(Serbia) J Jakšić	6^{5}	3
(United Kingdom) N Broady	7^{7}	6
(United States) R Kingsley	6	4	3
(United States) S Rogers	2	6	6
(Japan) M Hibi	1	6	6
8	(United States) L Chirico	6	4	4

Quarterfinals
1	(United States) M Brengle	4	7^{9}	3
(United Kingdom) N Broady	6	6^{7}	6
(United States) S Rogers	6	7^{7}
(Japan) M Hibi	1	6^{4}

Semifinals
(United Kingdom) N Broady	7^{7}	6
(United States) S Rogers	6^{5}	2

=== Bottom half ===
First round
5	(United States) L Davis	6	2
(United States) S Vickery	2	0^{r}
(United States) J Boserup	3	2
Q	(United States) J Loeb	6	6
Q	(United States) L Albanese	7	7
(United States) B Pera	5	6^{3}
(United States) N Gilchrist	4	1
3	(United States) I Falconi	6	6
7	(United States) S Crawford	3	2
(United States) A Glatch	6	6
Q	(United States) A Sanford	3	6	6
(United States) J Brady	6	2	1
WC	(United States) R Anderson	6	6
Q	(United States) M Gordon	1	3
(United States) C Bellis	7	6
2	(Germany) T Maria	5	3

Second round
5	(United States) L Davis	2	6	3
Q	(United States) J Loeb	6	2	6
Q	(United States) L Albanese	1	1
3	(United States) I Falconi	6	6
(United States) A Glatch	4	0^{r}
Q	(United States) A Sanford	6	0
WC	(United States) R Anderson	7	6
(United States) C Bellis	5	3

Quarterfinals
Q	(United States) J Loeb	7	3	2
3	(United States) I Falconi	5	6	6
Q	(United States) A Sanford	7	6^{5}	4
WC	(United States) R Anderson	5	7^{7}	6

Semifinals
3	(United States) I Falconi	3	4
WC	(United States) R Anderson	6	6
