= 2016 Dow Corning Tennis Classic =

- Date: 1–7 February
- Edition: 22nd
- Category: ITF Women's Circuit
- Prize money: $100,000
- Surface: Hard / Indoor
- Location: Midland, Michigan, United States

Champions

Singles
- (United Kingdom) Naomi Broady

Doubles
- (United States) Catherine Bellis / (United States) Ingrid Neel
| ← 2015 · | Dow Corning Tennis Classic | · 2017 → |

The 2016 Dow Corning Tennis Classic was a professional tennis tournament played on indoor hard courts. It was the twenty-second edition of the tournament and part of the 2016 ITF Women's Circuit, offering a total of $100,000 in prize money. It took place in Midland, Michigan, United States, on 1–7 February 2016.

== Singles main draw entrants ==
=== Seeds ===
| Country | Player | Rank^{1} | Seed |
|---|---|---|---|
| USA | Madison Brengle | 49 | 1 |
| GER | Tatjana Maria | 73 | 2 |
| USA | Irina Falconi | 74 | 3 |
| USA | Anna Tatishvili | 101 | 4 |
| USA | Lauren Davis | 103 | 5 |
| USA | Nicole Gibbs | 106 | 6 |
| USA | Samantha Crawford | 107 | 7 |
| USA | Louisa Chirico | 110 | 8 |

- ^{1} Rankings as of 18 January 2016.

=== Other entrants ===
The following players received wildcards into the singles main draw:

- (United States) Robin Anderson
- (United States) Taylor Townsend

The following players received entry from the qualifying draw:

- (United States) Lauren Albanese
- (United States) Michaela Gordon
- (United States) Jamie Loeb
- (United States) Alexandra Sanford

The following player received entry by a special exempt:

- (United States) Raveena Kingsley

== Champions ==
=== Singles ===
- (United Kingdom) Naomi Broady def. (United States) Robin Anderson, 6–7^{(6–8)}, 6–0, 6–2

=== Doubles ===
- (United States) Catherine Bellis / (United States) Ingrid Neel def. (United Kingdom) Naomi Broady / (United States) Shelby Rogers, 6–2, 6–4
