= 2017 Dow Tennis Classic – Singles =

Singles
- 2017 Dow Tennis Classic

Final
- Champion: (Germany) Tatjana Maria
- Runner-up: (United Kingdom) Naomi Broady
- Score: 6–4, 6–7^{(6–8)}, 6–4

Events
Singles	Doubles
← 2016 ·	Dow Tennis Classic	· 2018 →

Naomi Broady was the defending champion, but she lost in the final to Tatjana Maria, 6–4, 6–7^{(6–8)}, 6–4.

== Seeds ==
1. (United States) Madison Brengle (first round)
2. (United States) Varvara Lepchenko (quarterfinals)
3. (United Kingdom) Naomi Broady (final)
4. (United States) Irina Falconi (second round)
5. (Germany) Tatjana Maria (champion)
6. (United States) Jennifer Brady (withdrew)
7. (Paraguay) Verónica Cepede Royg (first round)
8. (United States) Julia Boserup (semifinals)
9. (United States) Samantha Crawford (first round)

== Main draw ==
Key

- Q = Qualifier
- WC = Wild card
- LL = Lucky loser
- Alt = Alternate
- ITF = ITF entry
- PR = Protected ranking
- SR = Special ranking
- SE = Special exempt
- JE = Junior exempt
- JR = Junior Accelerator Programme entrant
- CO = College Accelerator Programme entrant
- NG = Next Gen Accelerator Program entrant
- w/o = Walkover
- r = Retired
- d = Defaulted

=== Finals ===
Semifinals
5	(Germany) Tatjana Maria	6	6
8	(United States) Julia Boserup	1	4
3	(United Kingdom) Naomi Broady	6	6
Q	(Canada) Katherine Sebov	4	3

Final
5	(Germany) Tatjana Maria	6	6^{6}	6
3	(United Kingdom) Naomi Broady	4	7^{8}	4

=== Top half ===
First round
1	(United States) M Brengle	6	4	4
(United States) J Cako	4	6	6
(United States) K Day	6	7
WC	(United States) C Dolehide	3	5
Q	(United States) A Sanford	2	6^{4}
(Argentina) C Pella	6	7^{7}
(United States) S Kenin	0	3
5	(Germany) T Maria	6	6
4	(United States) I Falconi	2	6	6
(Belgium) A-S Mestach	6	2	0
(Slovakia) AK Schmiedlová	6	6
(United States) R Kingsley	2	1
(Paraguay) M González	2	7^{7}	2
(Czech Republic) J Malečková	6	6^{5}	6
WC	(United States) UM Arconada	1	3
8	(United States) J Boserup	6	6

Second round
(United States) J Cako	5	1
(United States) K Day	7	6
(Argentina) C Pella	1	3
5	(Germany) T Maria	6	6
4	(United States) I Falconi	3	6^{4}
(Slovakia) AK Schmiedlová	6	7^{7}
(Czech Republic) J Malečková	5	2
8	(United States) J Boserup	7	6

Quarterfinals
(United States) K Day	3	1
5	(Germany) T Maria	6	6
(Slovakia) AK Schmiedlová	6	2	5
8	(United States) J Boserup	2	6	7

Semifinals
5	(Germany) T Maria	6	6
8	(United States) J Boserup	1	4

=== Bottom half ===
First round
9	(United States) S Crawford	1	1
Q	(Russia) V Savinykh	6	6
(Bulgaria) S Karatantcheva	6	6
LL	(United States) N Frenkel	4	3
(United States) D Lao	4	6	6
(United States) E Halbauer	6	3	3
(Serbia) J Jakšić	3	2
3	(United Kingdom) N Broady	6	6
7	(Paraguay) V Cepede Royg	7	4	4
Q	(Canada) K Sebov	5	6	6
(United States) R Anderson	6	6^{7}	0^{r}
(Russia) S Zhuk	2	7^{9}	3
(Portugal) M Larcher de Brito	5	0
Q	(Poland) K Kawa	7	6
(Japan) M Hibi	6	5	4
2/WC	(United States) V Lepchenko	4	7	6

Second round
Q	(Russia) V Savinykh	3	1
(Bulgaria) S Karatantcheva	6	6
(United States) D Lao	6^{5}	0
3	(United Kingdom) N Broady	7^{7}	6
Q	(Canada) K Sebov	6	6
(Russia) S Zhuk	1	4
Q	(Poland) K Kawa	2	4
2/WC	(United States) V Lepchenko	6	6

Quarterfinals
(Bulgaria) S Karatantcheva	2	1
3	(United Kingdom) N Broady	6	6
Q	(Canada) K Sebov	3	6	7^{7}
2/WC	(United States) V Lepchenko	6	4	6^{5}

Semifinals
3	(United Kingdom) N Broady	6	6
Q	(Canada) K Sebov	4	3
