= 2013 Dow Corning Tennis Classic – Singles =

Singles
- 2013 Dow Corning Tennis Classic

Final
- Champion: (United States) Lauren Davis
- Runner-up: (Croatia) Ajla Tomljanović
- Score: 6–3, 2–6, 7–6^{(7–2)}

Events
| Singles | Doubles |
| ← 2012 · | Dow Corning Tennis Classic | · 2014 → |

Olga Govortsova was the defending champion, but chose not to participate.

Lauren Davis won the title, defeating Ajla Tomljanović in the final, 6–3, 2–6, 7–6^{(7–2)}.

== Seeds ==
1. (United States) Lauren Davis (champion)
2. (United States) Coco Vandeweghe (first round)
3. (France) Stéphanie Foretz Gacon (first round)
4. (Hungary) Melinda Czink (second round)
5. (Germany) Tatjana Malek (second round)
6. (Russia) Olga Puchkova (second round)
7. (Croatia) Mirjana Lučić-Baroni (quarterfinals)
8. (Puerto Rico) Monica Puig (semifinals)

== Main draw ==
=== Key ===
- Q = Qualifier
- WC = Wild card
- LL = Lucky loser
- Alt = Alternate
- SE = Special exempt
- PR = Protected ranking
- ITF = ITF entry
- JE = Junior exempt
- w/o = Walkover
- r = Retired
- d = Defaulted
- SR = Special ranking

=== Finals ===
Semifinals
1 | (United States) Lauren Davis | 1 | 6 | 6
8 | (Puerto Rico) Monica Puig | 6 | 4 | 2
(United States) Mallory Burdette | 5 | 0
PR | (Croatia) Ajla Tomljanović | 7 | 6

Final
1 | (United States) Lauren Davis | 6 | 2 | 7^{7}
PR | (Croatia) Ajla Tomljanović | 3 | 6 | 6^{2}

=== Top half ===
First round
1 | (United States) L Davis | 5 | 6 | 6
(France) C Feuerstein | 7 | 4 | 4
(United States) J Cohen | 4 | 6 | 3
(United States) A Glatch | 6 | 2 | 6
WC | (United States) A-L Jeukeng | 4 | 2
(Russia) A Kudryavtseva | 6 | 6
(United States) S Rogers | 3 | 6 | 6^{5}
5 | (Germany) T Malek | 6 | 1 | 7^{7}
4 | (Hungary) M Czink | 6 | 7
Q | (United States) C-Y Hsu | 3 | 5
(United States) J Pegula | 2 | 6 | 6
(United States) I Falconi | 6 | 4 | 1
Q | (United States) S Vickery | 6 | 6
JE | (United States) T Townsend | 4 | 3
Q | (United States) A Stevenson | 5 | 4
8 | (Puerto Rico) M Puig | 7 | 6

Second round
1 | (United States) L Davis | 6 | 6
(United States) A Glatch | 2 | 2
(Russia) A Kudryavtseva | 1 | 6 | 6
5 | (Germany) T Malek | 6 | 3 | 1
4 | (Hungary) M Czink | 4 | 4
(United States) J Pegula | 6 | 6
Q | (United States) S Vickery | 4 | 4
8 | (Puerto Rico) M Puig | 6 | 6

Quarterfinals
1 | (United States) L Davis | 5 | 7^{7} | 7
(Russia) A Kudryavtseva | 7 | 6^{4} | 5
(United States) J Pegula | 3 | 5
8 | (Puerto Rico) M Puig | 6 | 7

Semifinals
1 | (United States) L Davis | 1 | 6 | 6
8 | (Puerto Rico) M Puig | 6 | 4 | 2

=== Bottom half ===
First round
7 | (Croatia) M Lučić-Baroni | 6 | 6
Q | (United States) A Mueller | 1 | 2
(United States) J Craybas | 6 | 6
(United States) C Scholl | 0 | 3
(United States) S Crawford | 4 | 6 | 7^{7}
(United Kingdom) S Murray | 6 | 2 | 6^{3}
(United States) M Burdette | 6 | 6
3 | (France) S Foretz Gacon | 3 | 2
6 | (Russia) O Puchkova | 6 | 6
WC | (United States) A Muhammad | 3 | 2
PR | (Croatia) A Tomljanović | 2 | 6 | 6
(France) I Pavlovic | 6 | 3 | 3
LL | (Brazil) MF Alves | 4 | 1
(United States) M Sanchez | 6 | 6
LL | (United States) V Duval | 7 | 4 | 6
2 | (United States) C Vandeweghe | 5 | 6 | 1

Second round
7 | (Croatia) M Lučić-Baroni | 6 | 4 | 6
(United States) J Craybas | 0 | 6 | 2
(United States) S Crawford | 2 | 6^{3}
(United States) M Burdette | 6 | 7^{7}
6 | (Russia) O Puchkova | 1 | 4
PR | (Croatia) A Tomljanović | 6 | 6
(United States) M Sanchez | 6 | 6
LL | (United States) V Duval | 2 | 2

Quarterfinals
7 | (Croatia) M Lučić-Baroni | 4 | 6 | 4
(United States) M Burdette | 6 | 4 | 6
PR | (Croatia) A Tomljanović | 6 | 6
(United States) M Sanchez | 2 | 2

Semifinals
(United States) M Burdette | 5 | 0
PR | (Croatia) A Tomljanović | 7 | 6
