= 2014 Dow Corning Tennis Classic – Singles =

Singles
- 2014 Dow Corning Tennis Classic

Final
- Champion: (United Kingdom) Heather Watson
- Runner-up: (Russia) Ksenia Pervak
- Score: 6–4, 6–0

Events
Singles	Doubles
← 2013 ·	Dow Corning Tennis Classic	· 2015 →

Lauren Davis was the defending champion, but lost in the quarterfinals.

Heather Watson won the tournament, defeating Ksenia Pervak in the final, 6–4, 6–0.

== Seeds ==
1. (Poland) Urszula Radwańska (quarterfinals)
2. (United States) Lauren Davis (quarterfinals)
3. (Switzerland) Romina Oprandi (first round)
4. (Belarus) Olga Govortsova (quarterfinals)
5. (United States) Coco Vandeweghe (first round)
6. (Canada) Sharon Fichman (semifinals)
7. (Georgia (country)) Anna Tatishvili (second round)
8. (Serbia) Vesna Dolonc (quarterfinals)

== Main draw ==
=== Key ===
- Q = Qualifier
- WC = Wild card
- LL = Lucky loser
- Alt = Alternate
- SE = Special exempt
- PR = Protected ranking
- ITF = ITF entry
- JE = Junior exempt
- w/o = Walkover
- r = Retired
- d = Defaulted
- SR = Special ranking

=== Finals ===
Semifinals
6	(Canada) Sharon Fichman	3	6^{5}
(Russia) Ksenia Pervak	6	7^{7}
(United Kingdom) Heather Watson	6	6
(Sweden) Sofia Arvidsson	3	4

Final
(Russia) Ksenia Pervak	4	0
(United Kingdom) Heather Watson	6	6

=== Top half ===
First round
1	(Poland) U Radwańska	6	7
(United States) S Vickery	4	5
(United States) M Brengle	4	4
(Czech Republic) K Siniaková	6	6
(United States) A Kiick	3	3
(France) S Foretz Gacon	6	6
(Serbia) J Jakšić	5	6	4
6	(Canada) S Fichman	7	4	6
3	(Switzerland) R Oprandi	6^{2}	0
(Russia) K Pervak	7^{7}	6
(United States) V Duval	6	7^{7}
(Kazakhstan) S Karatantcheva	3	6^{3}
(United States) S Rogers	6	6
(Serbia) A Krunić	3	3
WC	(United States) TA Black	2	5
8	(Serbia) V Dolonc	6	7

Second round
1	(Poland) U Radwańska	2	6	6
(Czech Republic) K Siniaková	6	3	1
(France) S Foretz Gacon	0	6	2
6	(Canada) S Fichman	6	1	6
(Russia) K Pervak	7	6
(United States) V Duval	5	2
(United States) S Rogers	1	1
8	(Serbia) V Dolonc	6	6

Quarterfinals
1	(Poland) U Radwańska	3	5
6	(Canada) S Fichman	6	7
(Russia) K Pervak	6	6
8	(Serbia) V Dolonc	1	3

Semifinals
6	(Canada) S Fichman	3	6^{5}
(Russia) K Pervak	6	7^{7}

=== Bottom half ===
First round
7	(Georgia (country)) A Tatishvili	7^{7}	6
WC	(United States) T Townsend	6^{2}	2
(United Kingdom) H Watson	6	6
(Greece) E Daniilidou	1	3
WC	(United States) B Austin	2	4
Q	(United States) L Litvak	6	6
Q	(Japan) N Osaka	4	7^{7}	4
4	(Belarus) O Govortsova	6	6^{5}	6
5	(United States) C Vandeweghe	6^{3}	6	3
(Sweden) S Arvidsson	7^{7}	1	6
Q	(Canada) F Abanda	6	4	6
(United States) M Sanchez	4	6	4
(Czech Republic) L Hradecká	7	7
(Italy) ME Camerin	5	5
Q	(United States) A Mueller	3	2
2/WC	(United States) L Davis	6	6

Second round
7	(Georgia (country)) A Tatishvili	2	4
(United Kingdom) H Watson	6	6
Q	(United States) L Litvak	1	0
4	(Belarus) O Govortsova	6	6
(Sweden) S Arvidsson	6	6
Q	(Canada) F Abanda	4	4
(Czech Republic) L Hradecká	6	3	4
2/WC	(United States) L Davis	2	6	6

Quarterfinals
(United Kingdom) H Watson	6	6
4	(Belarus) O Govortsova	3	2
(Sweden) S Arvidsson	6	7^{8}
2/WC	(United States) L Davis	3	6^{6}

Semifinals
(United Kingdom) H Watson	6	6
(Sweden) S Arvidsson	3	4
