= 2013 Dow Corning Tennis Classic – Doubles =

Doubles
- 2013 Dow Corning Tennis Classic

Final
- Champions: (Hungary) Melinda Czink (Croatia) Mirjana Lučić-Baroni
- Runners-up: (Brazil) Maria Fernanda Alves (United Kingdom) Samantha Murray
- Score: 5–7, 6–4, [10–7]

Events
| Singles | Doubles |
| ← 2012 · | Dow Corning Tennis Classic | · 2014 → |

Andrea Hlaváčková and Lucie Hradecká were the defending champions but chose not to compete.

Melinda Czink and Mirjana Lučić-Baroni won the title, defeating Maria Fernanda Alves and Samantha Murray in the final, 5–7, 6–4, [10–7].

== Seeds ==
1. (Latvia) Līga Dekmeijere / (France) Stéphanie Foretz Gacon (first round)
2. (United States) Irina Falconi / (United States) Maria Sanchez (first round)
3. (United States) Julia Cohen / (Russia) Alla Kudryavtseva (semifinals)
4. (United States) Jacqueline Cako / (United States) Natalie Pluskota (first round)

== Draw ==
=== Key ===
- Q = Qualifier
- WC = Wild card
- LL = Lucky loser
- Alt = Alternate
- SE = Special exempt
- PR = Protected ranking
- ITF = ITF entry
- JE = Junior exempt
- w/o = Walkover
- r = Retired
- d = Defaulted
- SR = Special ranking

First round
1 | (Latvia) L Dekmeijere (France) S Foretz Gacon | 6 | 6^{4} | [9]
(Hungary) M Czink (Croatia) M Lučić-Baroni | 4 | 7^{7} | [11]
(United States) S Marand (United States) A Mueller | 6 | 5 | [7]
(United States) A Glatch (United States) A Muhammad | 4 | 7 | [10]
4 | (United States) J Cako (United States) N Pluskota | 6^{3} | 6^{3}
(United States) C-Y Hsu (United States) S Rogers | 7^{7} | 7^{7}
(United States) J Craybas (United States) C Vandeweghe | 6 | 2 | [10]
(United States) S Crawford (United States) T Townsend | 4 | 6 | [7]
WC | (Netherlands) J Scheepens (Netherlands) B Schultz-McCarthy | 3 | 1
(United States) N Melichar (United States) C Scholl | 6 | 6
WC | (United States) V Duval (United States) S Vickery
3 | (United States) J Cohen (Russia) A Kudryavtseva | w/o
(United States) M Burdette (United States) J Pegula | 7^{7} | 6
(France) I Pavlovic (Russia) O Puchkova | 6^{3} | 2
(Brazil) MF Alves (United Kingdom) S Murray | 3 | 6 | [10]
2 | (United States) I Falconi (United States) M Sanchez | 6 | 1 | [6]

Quarterfinals
(Hungary) M Czink (Croatia) M Lučić-Baroni | 6 | 6
(United States) A Glatch (United States) A Muhammad | 3 | 3
(United States) C-Y Hsu (United States) S Rogers | 3 | 3
(United States) J Craybas (United States) C Vandeweghe | 6 | 6
(United States) N Melichar (United States) C Scholl | 4 | 2
3 | (United States) J Cohen (Russia) A Kudryavtseva | 6 | 6
(United States) M Burdette (United States) J Pegula | 6^{6} | 7 | [5]
(Brazil) MF Alves (United Kingdom) S Murray | 7^{8} | 5 | [10]

Semifinals
(Hungary) M Czink (Croatia) M Lučić-Baroni | 7^{7} | 6
(United States) J Craybas (United States) C Vandeweghe | 6^{3} | 0
3 | (United States) J Cohen (Russia) A Kudryavtseva | 3 | 1
(Brazil) MF Alves (United Kingdom) S Murray | 6 | 6

Final
(Hungary) M Czink (Croatia) M Lučić-Baroni | 5 | 6 | [10]
(Brazil) MF Alves (United Kingdom) S Murray | 7 | 4 | [7]
