= 2014 Dow Corning Tennis Classic =

- Date: February 10–16
- Edition: 20th
- Category: ITF Women's Circuit
- Prize money: $100,000
- Surface: Hard (indoor)
- Location: Midland, Michigan, United States

Champions

Singles
- (United Kingdom) Heather Watson

Doubles
- (Georgia (country)) Anna Tatishvili / (United Kingdom) Heather Watson
← 2013 ·	Dow Corning Tennis Classic	· 2015 →

The 2014 Dow Corning Tennis Classic was a professional tennis tournament played on indoor hard courts. It was the 20th edition of the tournament and part of the 2014 ITF Women's Circuit, offering a total of $100,000 in prize money. It took place in Midland, Michigan, United States, on February 10–16, 2014.

== Singles main draw entrants ==
=== Seeds ===
Country	Player	Rank^{1}	Seed
POL	Urszula Radwańska	45	1
USA	Lauren Davis	67	2
SUI	Romina Oprandi	94	3
BLR	Olga Govortsova	98	4
USA	Coco Vandeweghe	108	5
CAN	Sharon Fichman	112	6
GEO	Anna Tatishvili	115	7
SRB	Vesna Dolonc	117	8

- ^{1} Rankings as of February 3, 2014

=== Other entrants ===
The following players received wildcards into the singles main draw:

- (United States) Brooke Austin
- (United States) Tornado Alicia Black
- (United States) Lauren Davis
- (United States) Taylor Townsend

The following players received entry from the qualifying draw:

- (Canada) Françoise Abanda
- (United States) Lena Litvak
- (United States) Alexandra Mueller
- (Japan) Naomi Osaka

== Champions ==
=== Singles ===
- (United Kingdom) Heather Watson def. (Russia) Ksenia Pervak, 6–4, 6–0

=== Doubles ===
- (Georgia (country)) Anna Tatishvili / (United Kingdom) Heather Watson def. (Canada) Sharon Fichman / (United States) Maria Sanchez, 7–5, 5–7, [10–6]
