= 2015 Dow Corning Tennis Classic – Doubles =

Doubles
- 2015 Dow Corning Tennis Classic

Final
- Champions: (France) Julie Coin (United Kingdom) Emily Webley-Smith
- Runners-up: (United States) Jacqueline Cako (United States) Sachia Vickery
- Score: 4–6, 7–6^{(7–4)}, [11–9]

Events
Singles	Doubles
← 2014 ·	Dow Corning Tennis Classic	· 2016 →

Anna Tatishvili and Heather Watson were the defending champions, but Watson chose not to participate. Tatishvili partnered with Louisa Chirico, but they withdrew before playing their first round.

Julie Coin and Emily Webley-Smith won the title, defeating Jacqueline Cako and Sachia Vickery in the final, 4–6, 7–6^{(7–4)}, [11–9].

== Seeds ==
1. (United States) Asia Muhammad / (United States) Maria Sanchez (first round)
2. (Romania) Sorana Cîrstea / (Czech Republic) Eva Hrdinová (quarterfinals)
3. (Romania) Elena Bogdan / (United States) Nicole Melichar (quarterfinals)
4. (United States) Louisa Chirico / (United States) Anna Tatishvili (first round; withdrew)

== Draw ==
=== Key ===
- Q = Qualifier
- WC = Wild card
- LL = Lucky loser
- Alt = Alternate
- SE = Special exempt
- PR = Protected ranking
- ITF = ITF entry
- JE = Junior exempt
- w/o = Walkover
- r = Retired
- d = Defaulted
- SR = Special ranking

First round
1	(United States) A Muhammad (United States) M Sanchez	2	3
(Ukraine) O Korashvili (Japan) A Okuno	6	6
(United States) J Cako (United States) S Vickery	7^{7}	6
WC	(United States) S Daavettila (United States) A Jones	6^{3}	3
3	(Romania) E Bogdan (United States) N Melichar	6	3	[10]
(United States) B Pera (United Kingdom) N Slater	4	6	[8]
(Chinese Taipei) C-y Hsu (United States) A Mueller	3	6^{4}
(United States) A Weinhold (United States) C Whoriskey	6	7^{7}
(United States) J Abaza (United States) S Marand	6	6
PR	(United States) S Crawford (United States) J Pegula	2	4
(United States) L Abanese (United States) D Lao	w/o
4	(United States) L Chirico (United States) A Tatishvili
WC	(United States) MA Root (United States) C Szabo	2	0
(France) J Coin (United Kingdom) E Webley-Smith	6	6
WC	(United States) C Dolehide (United States) L Embree	5	4
2	(Romania) S Cîrstea (Czech Republic) E Hrdinová	7	6

Quarterfinals
(Ukraine) O Korashvili (Japan) A Okuno	5	4
(United States) J Cako (United States) S Vickery	7	6
3	(Romania) E Bogdan (United States) N Melichar	6	3	[8]
(United States) A Weinhold (United States) C Whoriskey	3	6	[10]
(United States) J Abaza (United States) S Marand	6	6
(United States) L Abanese (United States) D Lao	4	3
(France) J Coin (United Kingdom) E Webley-Smith	3	7^{8}	[11]
2	(Romania) S Cîrstea (Czech Republic) E Hrdinová	6	6^{6}	[9]

Semifinals
(United States) J Cako (United States) S Vickery	6	1	[12]
(United States) A Weinhold (United States) C Whoriskey	0	6	[10]
(United States) J Abaza (United States) S Marand	5	3
(France) J Coin (United Kingdom) E Webley-Smith	7	6

Final
(United States) J Cako (United States) S Vickery	6	6^{4}	[9]
(France) J Coin (United Kingdom) E Webley-Smith	4	7^{7}	[11]
