= 2013 Dow Corning Tennis Classic =

- Date: February 4–10
- Edition: 19th
- Category: ITF Women's Circuit
- Prize money: $100,000
- Surface: Hard (indoor)
- Location: Midland, Michigan, United States

Champions

Singles
- (United States) Lauren Davis

Doubles
- (Hungary) Melinda Czink / (Croatia) Mirjana Lučić-Baroni
← 2012 ·	Dow Corning Tennis Classic	· 2014 →

The 2013 Dow Corning Tennis Classic was a professional tennis tournament played on indoor hard courts. It was the nineteenth edition of the tournament which was part of the 2013 ITF Women's Circuit, offering a total of $100,000 in prize money. It took place in Midland, Michigan, United States, on February 4–10, 2013.

== Women's singles main draw entrants ==
=== Seeds ===
Country	Player	Rank^{1}	Seed
USA	Lauren Davis	91	1
USA	Coco Vandeweghe	99	2
FRA	Stéphanie Foretz Gacon	102	3
HUN	Melinda Czink	105	4
GER	Tatjana Malek	108	5
RUS	Olga Puchkova	111	6
CRO	Mirjana Lučić-Baroni	114	7
PUR	Monica Puig	115	8

- ^{1} Rankings as of January 28, 2013

=== Other entrants ===
The following players received wildcards into the singles main draw:

- (United States) Anne-Liz Jeukeng
- (United States) Asia Muhammad

The following players received entry from the qualifying draw:

- (United States) Chieh-Yu Hsu
- (United States) Alexandra Mueller
- (United States) Alexandra Stevenson
- (United States) Sachia Vickery

The following players received entry into the singles main draw as lucky losers:

- (Brazil) Maria Fernanda Alves
- (United States) Victoria Duval

The following player received entry by a Protected Ranking:

- (Croatia) Ajla Tomljanović

The following player received entry through Junior Exempt:

- (United States) Taylor Townsend

== Champions ==
=== Singles ===
- (United States) Lauren Davis def. (Croatia) Ajla Tomljanović 6–3, 2–6, 7–6^{(7–2)}

=== Doubles ===
- (Hungary) Melinda Czink / (Croatia) Mirjana Lučić-Baroni def. (Brazil) Maria Fernanda Alves / (United Kingdom) Samantha Murray 5–7, 6–4, [10–7]
