= 2015 Dow Corning Tennis Classic =

- Date: 2–8 February
- Edition: 21st
- Category: ITF Women's Circuit
- Prize money: $100,000
- Surface: Hard (indoor)
- Location: Midland, Michigan, United States
- Venue: Midland Community Tennis Center

Champions

Singles
- (Germany) Tatjana Maria

Doubles
- (France) Julie Coin / (United Kingdom) Emily Webley-Smith
← 2014 ·	Dow Corning Tennis Classic	· 2016 →

The 2015 Dow Corning Tennis Classic was a professional tennis tournament played on indoor hard courts. It was the twenty-first edition of the tournament which is part of the 2015 ITF Women's Circuit, offering a total of $100,000 in prize money. It took place in Midland, Michigan, United States, on 2–8 February 2015.

== Singles entrants ==
=== Seeds ===
Country	Player	Rank^{1}	Seed
USA	Nicole Gibbs	96	1
ROU	Sorana Cîrstea	97	2
SRB	Jovana Jakšić	127	3
TUN	Ons Jabeur	140	4
USA	Anna Tatishvili	141	5
GER	Tatjana Maria	163	6
BUL	Sesil Karatantcheva	175	7
USA	Louisa Chirico	185	8

- ^{1} Rankings as of 19 January 2015

=== Other entrants ===
The following players received wildcards into the singles main draw:

- (United States) Sara Daavettila
- (United States) Caroline Dolehide
- (United States) Lauren Embree

The following players received entry from the qualifying draw:

- (United Kingdom) Naomi Cavaday
- (United States) Danielle Lao
- (United States) Alexandra Stevenson
- (Czech Republic) Nicole Vaidišová

The following player received entry from a protected ranking:

- (United States) Jessica Pegula

== Champions ==
=== Singles ===
- (Germany) Tatjana Maria def. (United States) Louisa Chirico, 6–2, 6–0

=== Doubles ===
- (France) Julie Coin / (United Kingdom) Emily Webley-Smith def. (United States) Jacqueline Cako / (United States) Sachia Vickery, 4–6, 7–6^{(7–4)}, [11–9]
