= 2017 Dow Tennis Classic =

- Date: 30 January–5 February
- Edition: 23rd
- Category: ITF Women's Circuit
- Prize money: $100,000
- Surface: Hard / Indoor
- Location: Midland, Michigan, United States

Champions

Singles
- (Germany) Tatjana Maria

Doubles
- (United States) Ashley Weinhold / (United States) Caitlin Whoriskey
← 2016 ·	Dow Tennis Classic	· 2018 →

The 2017 Dow Tennis Classic was a professional tennis tournament played on indoor hard courts. It was the twenty-third edition of the tournament and part of the 2017 ITF Women's Circuit, offering a total of $100,000 in prize money. It took place in Midland, Michigan, United States, from 30 January–5 February 2017.

== Singles main draw entrants ==
=== Seeds ===
Country	Player	Rank^{1}	Seed
USA	Madison Brengle	69	1
USA	Varvara Lepchenko	88	2
GBR	Naomi Broady	97	3
USA	Irina Falconi	104	4
GER	Tatjana Maria	113	5
~~USA~~	~~Jennifer Brady~~	~~116~~	~~6~~
PAR	Verónica Cepede Royg	117	7
USA	Julia Boserup	119	8
USA	Samantha Crawford	162	9

- ^{1} Rankings as of 17 January 2017

=== Other entrants ===
The following players received wildcards into the singles main draw:

- (United States) Usue Maitane Arconada
- (United States) Caroline Dolehide
- (United States) Varvara Lepchenko

The following players received entry from the qualifying draw:

- (Poland) Katarzyna Kawa
- (United States) Alexandra Sanford
- (Russia) Valeria Savinykh
- (Canada) Katherine Sebov

The following player received entry by a lucky loser spot:

- (United States) Nicole Frenkel

== Champions ==
=== Singles ===
- (Germany) Tatjana Maria def. (United Kingdom) Naomi Broady, 6–4, 6–7^{(6–8)}, 6–4

=== Doubles ===
- (United States) Ashley Weinhold / (United States) Caitlin Whoriskey def. (United States) Kayla Day / (United States) Caroline Dolehide, 7–6^{(7–1)}, 6–3
