= 2016 Dow Corning Tennis Classic – Doubles =

Doubles
- 2016 Dow Corning Tennis Classic

Final
- Champions: (United States) Catherine Bellis (United States) Ingrid Neel
- Runners-up: (United Kingdom) Naomi Broady (United States) Shelby Rogers
- Score: 6–2, 6–4

Events
Singles	Doubles
← 2015 ·	Dow Corning Tennis Classic	· 2017 →

Julie Coin and Emily Webley-Smith were the defending champions, but Coin retired from professional tennis at the end of 2015. Webley-Smith partnered Riko Sawayanagi, but they lost in the first round.

Wildcards Catherine Bellis and Ingrid Neel won the title, defeating Naomi Broady and Shelby Rogers in the final, 6–2, 6–4.

== Seeds ==
1. (United States) Asia Muhammad / (United States) Maria Sanchez (quarterfinals)
2. (United Kingdom) Naomi Broady / (United States) Shelby Rogers (final)
3. (United States) Nicole Gibbs / (United States) Taylor Townsend (semifinals)
4. (Japan) Riko Sawayanagi / (United Kingdom) Emily Webley-Smith (first round)

== Draw ==
=== Key ===
- Q = Qualifier
- WC = Wild card
- LL = Lucky loser
- Alt = Alternate
- SE = Special exempt
- PR = Protected ranking
- ITF = ITF entry
- JE = Junior exempt
- w/o = Walkover
- r = Retired
- d = Defaulted
- SR = Special ranking

First round
1	(United States) A Muhammad (United States) M Sanchez	6	6
WC	(United States) J Brady (United States) L Chirico	4	2
WC	(United States) C Bellis (United States) I Neel	7	7
(United States) S Crawford (Canada) S Fichman	5	5
3	(United States) N Gibbs (United States) T Townsend	7^{7}	4	[12]
(United States) J Boserup (United States) S Marand	6^{5}	6	[10]
WC	(United States) A Jones (United States) A Sanford	1	1
(United States) R Anderson (Paraguay) V Cepede Royg	6	6
Alt	(United States) S Chang (United States) A Glatch	4	7^{7}	[5]
(Serbia) J Jakšić (China) S Xu	6	6^{3}	[10]
(United States) L Davis (United States) G Min	6	4	[10]
4	(Japan) R Sawayanagi (United Kingdom) E Webley-Smith	2	6	[8]
(United States) A Weinhold (United States) C Whoriskey	6	5	[10]
(United States) M Brengle (United States) A Tatishvili	3	7	[5]
(Czech Republic) K Kramperová (United States) B Pera	6	3	[8]
2	(United Kingdom) N Broady (United States) S Rogers	4	6	[10]

Quarterfinals
1	(United States) A Muhammad (United States) M Sanchez	1	2
WC	(United States) C Bellis (United States) I Neel	6	6
3	(United States) N Gibbs (United States) T Townsend	7^{7}	6
(United States) R Anderson (Paraguay) V Cepede Royg	6^{4}	2
(Serbia) J Jakšić (China) S Xu	6	2	[8]
(United States) L Davis (United States) G Min	1	6	[10]
(United States) A Weinhold (United States) C Whoriskey	7	4	[12]
2	(United Kingdom) N Broady (United States) S Rogers	5	6	[14]

Semifinals
WC	(United States) C Bellis (United States) I Neel	3	6	[10]
3	(United States) N Gibbs (United States) T Townsend	6	3	[6]
(United States) L Davis (United States) G Min	0	0
2	(United Kingdom) N Broady (United States) S Rogers	6	6

Final
WC	(United States) C Bellis (United States) I Neel	6	6
2	(United Kingdom) N Broady (United States) S Rogers	2	4
