= Naomi Broady =

British tennis player (born 1990)

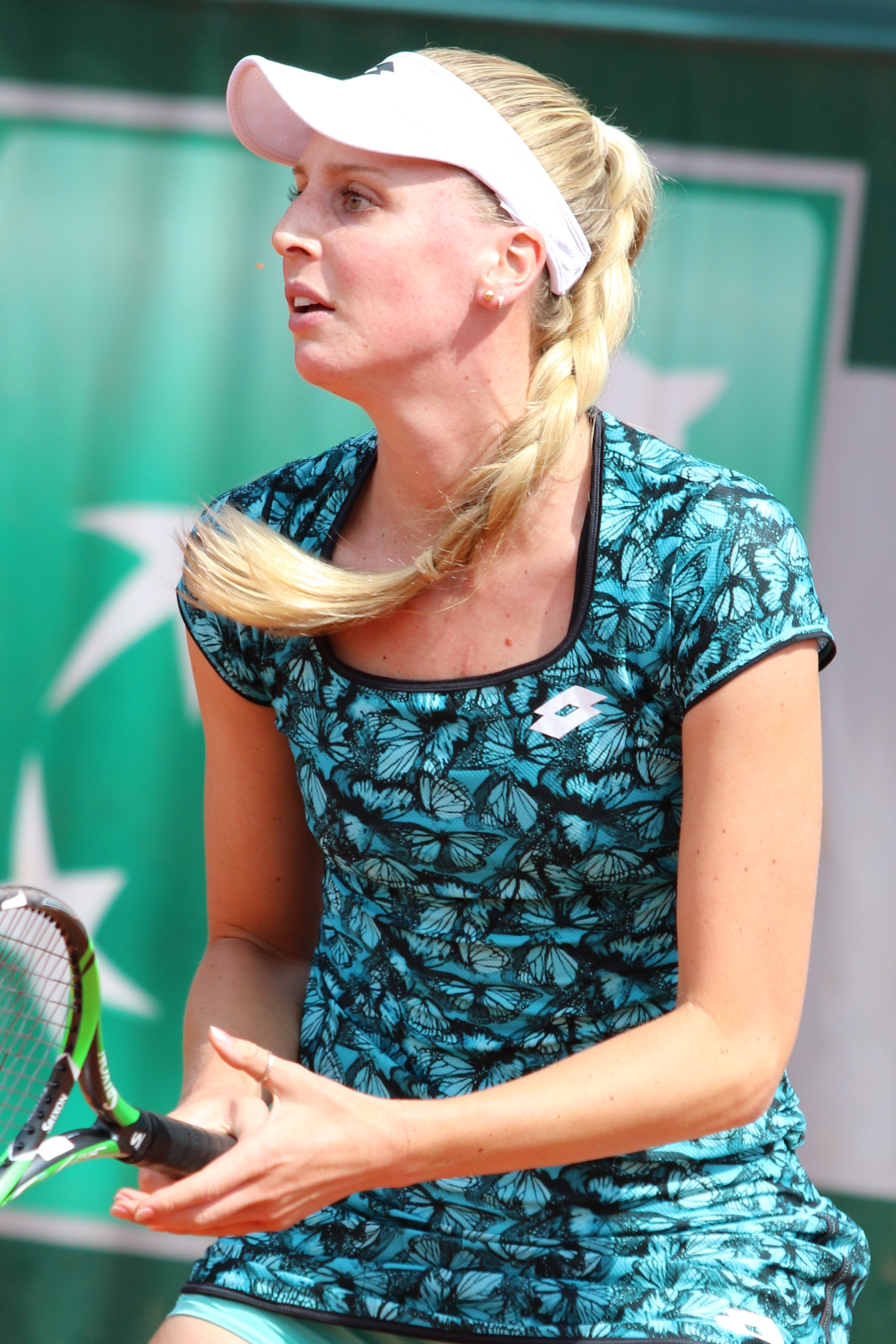
- Broady at the 2016 French Open
- Country (sports): United Kingdom
- Born: 28 February 1990 (age 36) Stockport, Greater Manchester, England
- Height: 1.89 m (6 ft 2 in)
- Turned pro: 2006
- Retired: 2021
- Plays: Right (one-handed backhand)
- Prize money: US$ 1,285,713

Singles
- Career record: 398–347
- Career titles: 9 ITF
- Highest ranking: No. 76 (7 March 2016)

Grand Slam singles results
- Australian Open: 1R (2017)
- French Open: 1R (2016)
- Wimbledon: 2R (2014)
- US Open: 2R (2016)

Doubles
- Career record: 272–209
- Career titles: 1 WTA, 20 ITF
- Highest ranking: No. 56 (22 May 2017)

Grand Slam doubles results
- Australian Open: 1R (2017)
- French Open: 1R (2016, 2017, 2018)
- Wimbledon: 3R (2016)
- US Open: 2R (2016, 2018)

Grand Slam mixed doubles results
- Wimbledon: QF (2014, 2021)

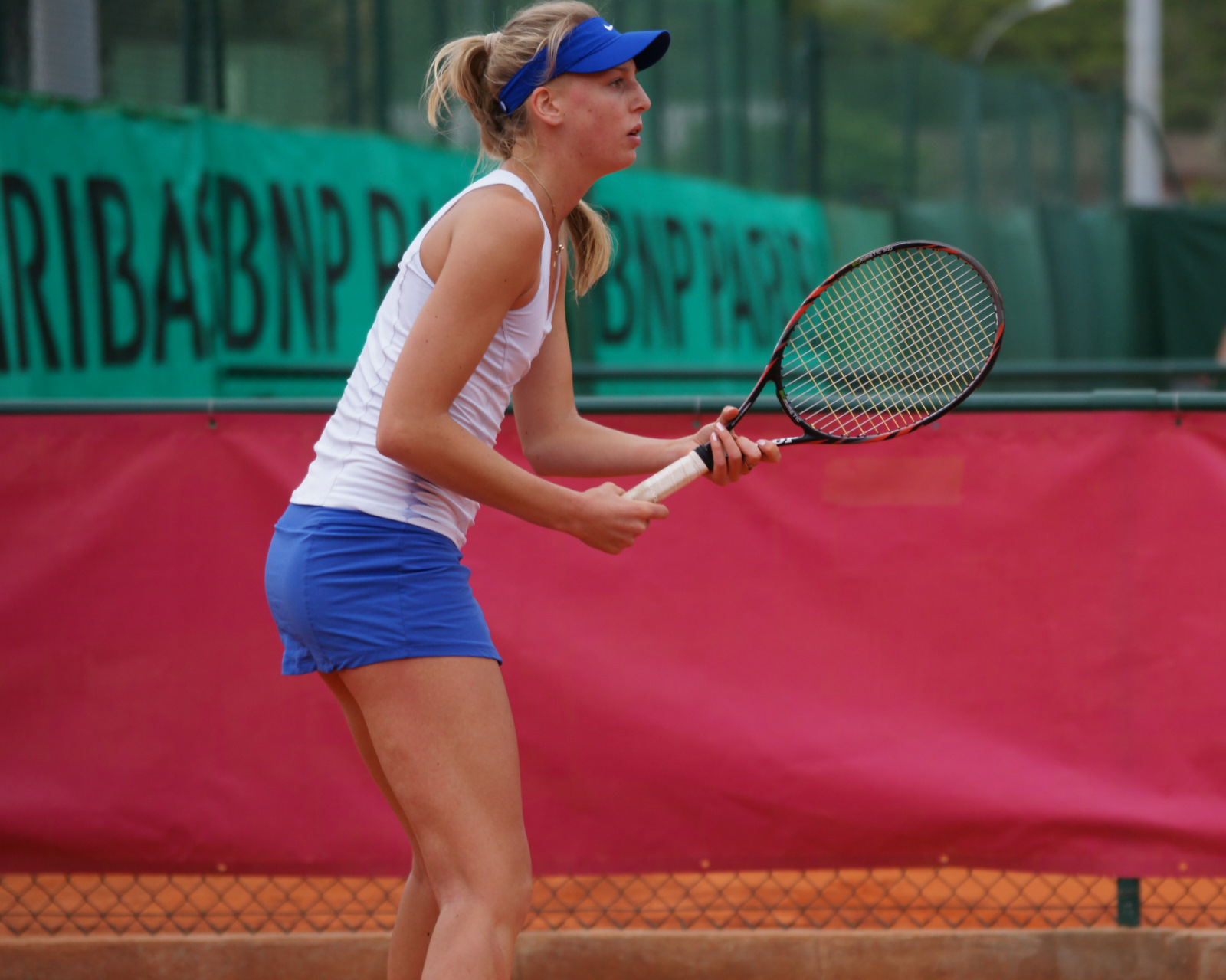
Broady at the 2012 Open de Cagnes-sur-Mer

Naomi Broady (/ˈbroʊdi/ BROH-dee; born 28 February 1990) is a British former tennis player.

She won one WTA Tour doubles title, as well as nine singles titles and 20 doubles titles on the ITF Women's Circuit. On 7 March 2016, she reached her best singles ranking of world No. 76. On 22 May 2017, she peaked at No. 56 in the doubles rankings.

== Background ==
Born in Stockport, Naomi Broady is a sister of tennis player Liam Broady and has another brother, Calum and a sister Emma. She attended Priestnall School. Broady began playing tennis at the age of seven and was the British under-18 girls' champion in 2007.

== Career ==
=== 2004–2008: Junior Circuit ===
Broady competed on the junior ITF Circuit from January 2004 until June 2008. She won one singles title in April 2006 at the Sutton ITF Junior Tournament and lost in the quarterfinals of four others, one of which was the 2008 Wimbledon girls' event, where she was beaten by Noppawan Lertcheewakarn of Thailand. She had a singles win–loss record of 21–13.

In junior doubles, Broady never won a title but reached the semifinals in one tournament and the quarterfinals in four others. In 2007, she and Tara Moore teamed up to compete in Wimbledon doubles, reaching the second round and Broady reached the same stage of Wimbledon doubles one year later partnering Jade Windley. Her final doubles win–loss record was 11–15 and her career-high combined ranking was world No. 251 (achieved 7 July 2008).

=== 2005–2007 ===
Broady began playing on adult ITF tournaments in January 2005, but was unable to qualify for any of the five tournaments she entered. As a result, she finished the year without a world ranking.

She continued playing on the ITF Women's Circuit in 2006 but did not pass round two of any tournament until November, when she reached the quarterfinals of the $10k event in Sunderland, where she lost to Martina Pavelec. Her first ever year-end ranking was world No. 1464.

Broady was again unable to progress past the second round of any tournament until August 2007 when she reached the quarterfinals of an ITF event in Cumberland, London, where Anna Smith beat her in three sets. She reached the semifinals of her final tournament in 2007, the Sunderland $10k tournament, losing to Christina Wheeler. Her 2007 year-end worldwide ranking was 713.

In September 2007, Broady and fellow British competitor, David Rice, were both suspended by the LTA for "unprofessional behaviour" and "lack of discipline" due to pictures posted on the social networking website Bebo. The pictures and various comments made on them were deemed to be supportive of a lifestyle of drinking and partying, and as such, both players had resources such as funding and coaching withdrawn. Their pages on Bebo were later shut down. Brendan Gallagher of The Daily Telegraph later commented that the photos were "comparatively tame" and "not the cleverest move for a wannabe tennis star but hardly scandalous behaviour for a 17-year-old." The actions of the LTA led to Broady refusing to play for the national team, a position she has maintained throughout her career. At the time of the action, the LTA were aware of (and warned) several other junior players for their behaviour.

=== 2008 ===
A more promising start saw Broady reach the semifinals of her first ITF event of the year in Sunderland. She was beaten by Johanna Larsson, 6–4, 6–2. In February, she reached the quarterfinals in Portimão, before losing to Nina Bratchikova. She made her debut on the WTA Tour in June at the Tier III Birmingham Classic qualifying tournament. She beat Andreja Klepač in the opening round before losing a hard-fought contest with Margit Rüütel in the second round. Her next tournament was another debut for Broady: her first Grand Slam appearance in the qualifying draw of Wimbledon. She was beaten by Rika Fujiwara in the opening round. Following this she spent the rest of the season on the ITF Circuit and reached three more quarterfinals, in Felixstowe ($25k), Cumberland ($10k) and Traralgon ($25k). Her year-end ranking was world No. 444.

=== 2009 ===
Broady reached the quarterfinals of a $10k event in Glasgow in January. She won her first adult title later that month in Grenoble, France where she was unseeded but could beat the No. 5 seed, Varvara Galanina, in the quarterfinals and the top seed, Youlia Fedossova, in the final. She did not drop a set throughout the tournament. In March, she reached another quarterfinal, this one in Bath; her performance moved her into the top 400 for the first time in her career. In June, she qualified for her first WTA Tour main draw, at the Birmingham Classic. She held a match point against Alla Kudryavtseva, before going down during a rain delayed match which was held over two days. She was beaten at the Eastbourne International by Katie O'Brien and in the second round of qualifying at Wimbledon. She got injured and didn't play again until a $25k event in Mexico. She won the tournament to cap off the best week in her career. The week after, she won a $10k event in Cuba.

=== 2014 ===
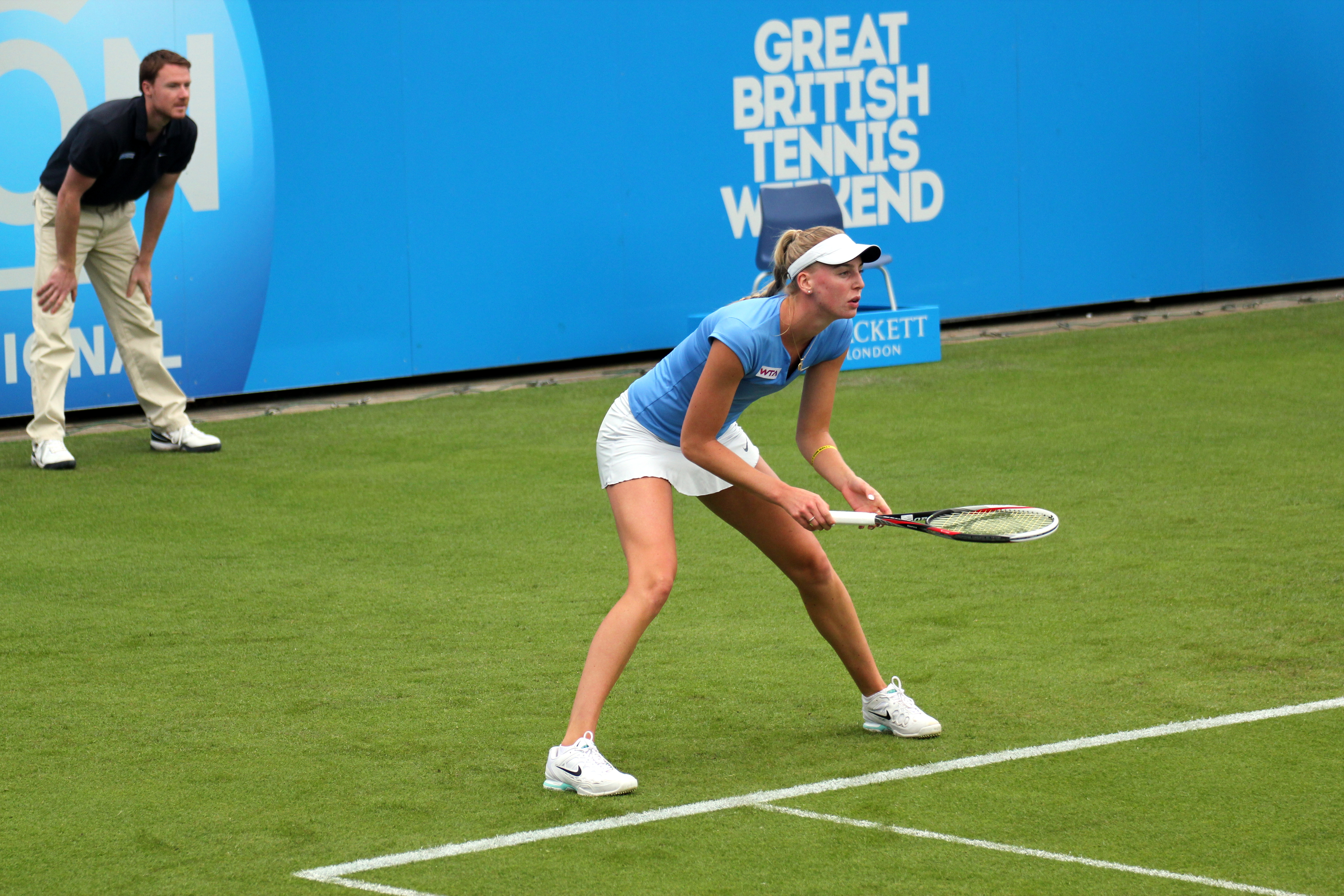
Broady at the 2014 Eastbourne International

Following a successful early half to the season, which included tournament wins in Sharm El Sheikh, Namangan, and Fukuoka, it was announced that Broady would receive a wildcard into the main draw of Wimbledon. She recorded her first ever Grand Slam match win, coming from a set down to defeat world No. 92, Tímea Babos. Her run was ended in the second round, losing to former world No. 1, Caroline Wozniacki, in straight sets. However, partnering Neal Skupski, she reached the quarterfinals in mixed doubles.

=== 2015 ===
The start of the new season was lacklustre, with only a few semifinal-appearances at ITF events. She did however achieve her first win on clay since 2011 in qualifying for the French Open, but lost in the second qualifying round to Anastasia Rodionova. The grass-court season started well for her, reaching the semifinals of Surbiton Trophy and achieving her first win of the season over a top-100 player by defeating Ajla Tomljanović at the Birmingham Classic in round one before losing to Simona Halep in the next round. Broady also failed to defend her second-round points at Wimbledon, losing in straight sets to Mariana Duque.

Broady's season picked up, however, on the American hardcourts. She qualified for the main draw of the Washington Open where she defeated Jarmila Gajdošová in three sets and achieved her first win in the main draw of a WTA Tour event outside of a British grass event. However, she lost to Ekaterina Makarova in her next match. She then won her first title of the season at the $25k event in Landisville, where she defeated American player Robin Anderson in the final.

Broady attempted to qualify for the US Open, but lost in the final round to Anett Kontaveit. She next entered the Tournoi de Québec where she again lost in the final qualifying round but received a lucky loser entrance into the main draw. There she fought her way to her first semifinal of a WTA event, before ultimately losing to the young Latvian player Jeļena Ostapenko. It was within this period during the U.S. hardcourt season that it became clear that playing aggressive in return games and using her big serve could make it difficult for her opponents to break her. For example, in her match at Washington against Jarmila Gajdošová, she served 19 aces, which was the fourth highest number of aces in a match on the 2015 WTA Tour.

Broady went on to reach the final of the Coleman Vision Championships, where she lost in a close match to Michaëlla Krajicek. She had two match points in the third set, but failed to close it out. She also hit 28 aces in this match, which was very close to breaking the record on the ITF Circuit for a female player. After this loss, Broady reached a career-high ranking of 116.

=== 2016 ===
Broady began 2016 at the Auckland Open where she defeated Laura Siegemund, Kateryna Kozlova, and Magdaléna Rybáriková in the qualifying. In the first round of the main draw, she recorded the biggest win of her career when she shocked No. 2 seed Ana Ivanovic. Broady's second-round contest with Jeļena Ostapenko featured a controversial incident during a second-set tiebreak, when Ostapenko seemed to fling her racket in the direction of the back of the court, which subsequently hit a ball boy. Although the boy wasn't injured, Broady approached the chair umpire to enquire why Ostapenko had not been defaulted, on the grounds that the racket had been thrown in frustration and not in an accidental fashion. Ostapenko claimed that she did not fling the racket but that it was an accident. After hailing the WTA supervisor, Ostapenko was issued a code violation and would go on to lose to Broady in three sets. A cold post-match handshake was also met with further drama, as the two verbally berated each other in an argument while packing their bags. Broady went out in the next round when she lost to Sloane Stephens for a spot in the semifinals.

Having been eliminated in the opening round of qualifying at the Australian Open, Broady travelled to the United States to play the ITF events in Maui and Midland. Broady reached the semifinals in Hawaii, before losing to top seed Christina McHale but went two better by winning the $100k event in Midland, beating US youngster Robin Anderson in the final. Broady broke into the world's top 100 for the first time following these results.

Broady's next event was the qualifying of the high-value Premier-5 event in Doha. She won her opening match, but then lost in final qualifying to Elena Vesnina. From here Broady moved on to Kuala Lumpur. She recorded wins over Klára Koukalová, Yang Zhaoxuan and former Wimbledon finalist Sabine Lisicki to reach her second WTA Tour semifinal, exiting at that stage to another former Wimbledon runner-up, Eugenie Bouchard. This run lifted Broady to a new career high ranking of 76.

=== 2017–2021 ===
Competing at the 2017 Midland Classic, Broady reached the singles final before losing in three sets to Tatjana Maria. In May, at the Empire Slovak Open, partnering with Heather Watson, Broady won the doubles competition on clay in two sets, bringing her doubles ranking to a new high of 56.

She lost in the first round of the 2018 Wimbledon Championships as a wildcard entry. This was her fifth first-round Wimbledon loss from six wildcard entries.

Broady worked as a commentator on BBC Radio 5 Live for the 2021 US Open.

== Playing style ==
Broady's big serve was the stand out feature of her game. Her tactic was to dominate opponents with her serve, making it impossible for them to break her, and then to try to get a break herself. Off the ground she used a one-handed backhand which could be very powerful but could also break down easily. During rallies, Broady hit powerful flat groundstrokes off both wings. She could also hit slice shots when on the defensive. She would often try to approach the net and volley to avoid long rallies.

== WTA Tour finals ==
=== Doubles: 2 (1 title, 1 runner-up) ===
Legend Premier International (1–1)	Finals by surface Hard (1–1)

Result	Date	Tournament	Tier	Surface	Partner	Opponents	Score
Loss	Oct 2016	Hong Kong Open	International	Hard	(United Kingdom) Heather Watson	(Chinese Taipei) Chan Hao-ching (Chinese Taipei) Chan Yung-jan	3–6, 1–6
Win	Apr 2018	Monterrey Open, Mexico	International	Hard	(Spain) Sara Sorribes Tormo	(United States) Desirae Krawczyk (Mexico) Giuliana Olmos	3–6, 6–4, [10–8]

== WTA 125 finals ==
=== Doubles: 2 (runner-ups) ===
Result	W–L	Date	Tournament	Surface	Partner	Opponents	Score
Loss	0–1	Nov 2017	Taipei Challenger, Taiwan	Carpet (i)	(Australia) Monique Adamczak	(Russia) Veronika Kudermetova (Belarus) Aryna Sabalenka	6–2, 6–7^{(5–7)}, [6–10]
Loss	0–2	Apr 2018	Zhengzhou Open, China	Hard	(Belgium) Yanina Wickmayer	(China) Duan Yingying (China) Wang Yafan	6–7^{(5–7)}, 3–6

== ITF Circuit finals ==
=== Singles: 19 (9 titles, 10 runner-ups) ===
Legend $100,000 tournaments (1–1) $75,000 tournaments (0–1) $50,000 tournaments (1–0) $25,000 tournaments (3–2) $10,000 tournaments (4–6)	Finals by surface Hard (8–8) Clay (0–2) Grass (1–0)

Result	W–L	Date	Tournament	Tier	Surface	Opponent	Score
Win	1–0	Feb 2009	ITF Grenoble, France	10,000	Hard (i)	(France) Youlia Fedossova	6–4, 6–2
Loss	1–1	May 2009	ITF Edinburgh, UK	10,000	Clay	(Hungary) Tímea Babos	4–6, 7–6^{(3)}, 6–7^{(8)}
Win	2–1	Nov 2009	ITF Puebla, Mexico	25,000	Hard	(Croatia) Ajla Tomljanović	7–6^{(4)}, 6–3
Win	3–1	Dec 2009	ITF Havana, Cuba	10,000	Hard	(Russia) Yana Koroleva	6–2, 6–0
Win	4–1	Dec 2009	ITF Havana, Cuba	10,000	Hard	(Italy) Valentine Confalonieri	6–2, 6–2
Loss	4–2	Sep 2010	ITF Madrid, Spain	10,000	Hard	(Russia) Marta Sirotkina	6–4, 4–6, 4–6
Loss	4–3	Jan 2011	GB Pro-Series Glasgow, UK	10,000	Hard (i)	(Bosnia and Herzegovina) Jasmina Tinjić	2–6, 2–6
Loss	4–4	Jan 2011	Open de l'Isère, France	25,000	Hard (i)	(Poland) Marta Domachowska	4–6, 4–6
Loss	4–5	May 2011	ITF Izmir, Turkey	25,000	Hard	(Romania) Mihaela Buzărnescu	5–7, 4–6
Loss	4–6	Apr 2012	ITF Bournemouth, UK	10,000	Clay	(United Kingdom) Jade Windley	3–6, 1–6
Loss	4–7	Mar 2013	ITF Sharm El Sheikh, Egypt	10,000	Hard	(Russia) Daria Mironova	6–7^{(2)}, 6–2, 6–7^{(4)}
Loss	4–8	Mar 2014	ITF Sharm El Sheikh, Egypt	10,000	Hard	(Russia) Vitalia Diatchenko	6–3, 4–6, 1–6
Win	5–8	Mar 2014	ITF Sharm El Sheikh, Egypt	10,000	Hard	(Russia) Vitalia Diatchenko	6–2, 3–0 ret.
Win	6–8	Apr 2014	ITF Namangan, Uzbekistan	25,000	Hard	(Uzbekistan) Nigina Abduraimova	6–3, 6–4
Win	7–8	May 2014	Fukuoka International, Japan	50,000	Grass	(Czech Republic) Kristýna Plíšková	5–7, 6–3, 6–4
Win	8–8	Aug 2015	ITF Landisville, United States	25,000	Hard	(United States) Robin Anderson	4–6, 6–4, 7–6^{(5)}
Loss	8–9	Sep 2015	Albuquerque Championships, US	75,000	Hard	(Netherlands) Michaëlla Krajicek	7–6^{(2)}, 6–7^{(3)}, 5–7
Win	9–9	Feb 2016	Midland Tennis Classic, US	100,000	Hard (i)	(United States) Robin Anderson	6–7^{(6)}, 6–0, 6–2
Loss	9–10	Feb 2017	Midland Tennis Classic, US	100,000	Hard (i)	(Germany) Tatjana Maria	4–6, 7–6^{(6)}, 4–6

=== Doubles: 35 (20 titles, 15 runner-ups) ===
Legend $100,000 tournaments (1–4) $75/80,000 tournaments (1–0) $50/60,000 tournaments (5–4) $25,000 tournaments (9–6) $10,000 tournaments (4–1)	Finals by surface Hard (11–11) Clay (3–1) Grass (1–3) Carpet (5–0)

Result	W–L	Date	Tournament	Tier	Surface	Partner	Opponents	Score
Win	1–0	Nov 2007	ITF Redbridge, UK	10,000	Hard (i)	(Poland) Patrycja Sanduska	(Netherlands) Daniëlle Harmsen (Netherlands) Renée Reinhard	0–6, 6–1, [10–5]
Win	2–0	Apr 2008	ITF Bol, Croatia	10,000	Clay	(Switzerland) Amra Sadiković	(Slovenia) Tina Obrez (Slovenia) Anja Prislan	6–4, 6–3
Win	3–0	May 2009	ITF Edinburgh, UK	10,000	Clay	(United Kingdom) Elizabeth Thomas	(Norway) Helene Auensen (Belarus) Volha Duko	3–6, 6–3, [10–7]
Loss	3–1	Jun 2010	Nottingham Trophy, UK	50,000	Grass	(United Kingdom) Katie O'Brien	(United Kingdom) Sarah Borwell (United States) Raquel Kops-Jones	3–6, 6–2, [7–10]
Win	4–1	Sep 2010	ITF Madrid, Spain	10,000	Hard	(United Kingdom) Emily Webley-Smith	(United Kingdom) Jennifer Ren (Russia) Marta Sirotkina	6–2, 6–3
Loss	4–2	Apr 2011	ITF Qarshi, Uzbekistan	25,000	Hard	(Australia) Isabella Holland	(Ukraine) Tetyana Arefyeva (Russia) Eugeniya Pashkova	7–6^{(1)}, 5–7, [7–10]
Win	5–2	May 2011	ITF Izmir, Turkey	25,000	Hard	(United Kingdom) Lisa Whybourn	(Romania) Mihaela Buzărnescu (Croatia) Tereza Mrdeža	3–6, 7–6^{(4)}, [10–7]
Win	6–2	Nov 2011	ITF Opole, Poland	25,000	Carpet (i)	(France) Kristina Mladenovic	(Poland) Paula Kania (Poland) Magda Linette	7–6^{(5)}, 6–4
Win	7–2	Nov 2011	ITF Bratislava, Slovakia	25,000	Hard (i)	(France) Kristina Mladenovic	(Czech Republic) Karolína Plíšková (Czech Republic) Kristýna Plíšková	5–7, 6–4, [10–2]
Loss	7–3	Mar 2012	ITF Clearwater, US	25,000	Hard	(United Kingdom) Heather Watson	(Georgia (country)) Ekaterine Gorgodze (Ukraine) Alyona Sotnikova	3–6, 2–6
Loss	7–4	Apr 2012	ITF Namangan, Uzbekistan	25,000	Hard	(Poland) Paula Kania	(Georgia (country)) Oksana Kalashnikova (Russia) Marta Sirotkina	2–6, 5–7
Loss	7–5	May 2012	Open Saint-Gaudens, France	50,000	Clay	(Israel) Julia Glushko	(Serbia) Vesna Dolonc (Russia) Irina Khromacheva	2–6, 0–6
Loss	7–6	Mar 2013	ITF Sharm El Sheikh, Egypt	10,000	Hard	(Serbia) Ana Veselinović	(Romania) Ilka Csöregi (Madagascar) Zarah Razafimahatratra	5–7, 3–6
Win	8–6	May 2013	ITF Balikpapan, Indonesia	25,000	Hard	(Serbia) Teodora Mirčić	(Chinese Taipei) Chen Yi (China) Xu Yifan	6–3, 6–3
Win	9–6	May 2013	ITF Tarakan, Indonesia	25,000	Hard (i)	(Serbia) Teodora Mirčić	(China) Tang Haochen (China) Tian Ran	6–2, 1–6, [10–5]
Win	10–6	Jul 2013	Sacramento Challenge, US	50,000	Hard	(Australia) Storm Sanders	(United States) Robin Anderson (United States) Lauren Embree	6–3, 6–4
Loss	10–7	Jul 2013	ITF Yakima, US	50,000	Hard	(United States) Irina Falconi	(United States) Jan Abaza (United States) Allie Will	5–7, 6–3, [3–10]
Win	11–7	Oct 2013	Lagos Open, Nigeria	25,000	Hard	(United Kingdom) Emily Webley-Smith	(Oman) Fatma Al-Nabhani (Romania) Cristina Dinu	3–6, 6–4, [10–7]
Win	12–7	Nov 2013	GB Pro-Series Barnstaple, UK	75,000	Hard (i)	(Czech Republic) Kristýna Plíšková	(Romania) Raluca Olaru (Austria) Tamira Paszek	6–3, 3–6, [10–5]
Loss	12–8	Feb 2014	Nottingham Trophy, UK	25,000	Hard (i)	(Czech Republic) Renata Voráčová	(United Kingdom) Jocelyn Rae (United Kingdom) Anna Smith	6–7^{(6)}, 4–6
Loss	12–9	May 2014	Fukuoka International, Japan	50,000	Grass	(Greece) Eleni Daniilidou	(Japan) Shuko Aoyama (Japan) Eri Hozumi	3–6, 4–6
Loss	12–10	Apr 2015	GB Pro-Series Barnstaple, UK	25,000	Hard (i)	(Russia) Ekaterina Bychkova	(France) Stéphanie Foretz (Croatia) Ana Vrljić	2–6, 7–5, [7–10]
Win	13–10	May 2015	Fukuoka International, Japan	50,000	Grass	(Czech Republic) Kristýna Plíšková	(Japan) Eri Hozumi (Japan) Junri Namigata	6–3, 6–4
Loss	13–11	Feb 2016	Midland Tennis Classic, US	100,000	Hard (i)	(United States) Shelby Rogers	(United States) Catherine Bellis (United States) Ingrid Neel	2–6, 4–6
Win	14–11	May 2017	Empire Slovak Open, Slovakia	100,000	Clay	(United Kingdom) Heather Watson	(Chinese Taipei) Chuang Chia-jung (Czech Republic) Renata Voráčová	6–3, 6–2
Loss	14–12	Jul 2017	President's Cup, Kazakhstan	100,000	Hard	(Belgium) Ysaline Bonaventure	(Russia) Natela Dzalamidze (Russia) Veronika Kudermetova	2–6, 0–6
Win	15–12	May 2018	Fukuoka International, Japan	60,000	Carpet	(United States) Asia Muhammad	(United Kingdom) Tara Moore (Switzerland) Amra Sadiković	6–2, 6–0
Win	16–12	May 2018	Kurume Cup, Japan	60,000	Carpet	(United States) Asia Muhammad	(United Kingdom) Katy Dunne (Papua New Guinea) Abigail Tere-Apisah	6–2, 6–4
Loss	16–13	Jun 2018	Manchester Trophy, UK	100,000	Grass	(United States) Asia Muhammad	(Thailand) Luksika Kumkhum (India) Prarthana Thombare	6–7^{(5)}, 3–6
Win	17–13	Sep 2018	ITF Lubbock, US	25,000	Hard	(Argentina) Nadia Podoroska	(Montenegro) Vladica Babić (United States) Hayley Carter	3–6, 6–2, [10–8]
Win	18–13	May 2019	Fukuoka International, Japan	W60	Carpet	(United Kingdom) Heather Watson	(United States) Kristie Ahn (Australia) Alison Bai	w/o
Win	19–13	May 2019	ITF Karuizawa, Japan	W25	Carpet	(Japan) Ayaka Okuno	(Japan) Erina Hayashi (Japan) Momoko Kobori	6–3, 2–6, [10–7]
Loss	19–14	Aug 2019	Vancouver Open, Canada	W100	Hard	(New Zealand) Erin Routliffe	(Japan) Nao Hibino (Japan) Miyu Kato	2–6, 2–6
Win	20–14	Oct 2019	ITF Cherbourg, France	W25+H	Hard (i)	(United Kingdom) Samantha Murray	(France) Myrtille Georges (Belgium) Kimberley Zimmermann	6–3, 6–2
Loss	20–15	Feb 2021	ITF Potchefstroom, South Africa	W25	Hard	(United Kingdom) Eden Silva	(Netherlands) Lesley Pattinama Kerkhove (Netherlands) Bibiane Schoofs	6–4, 3–6, [6–10]

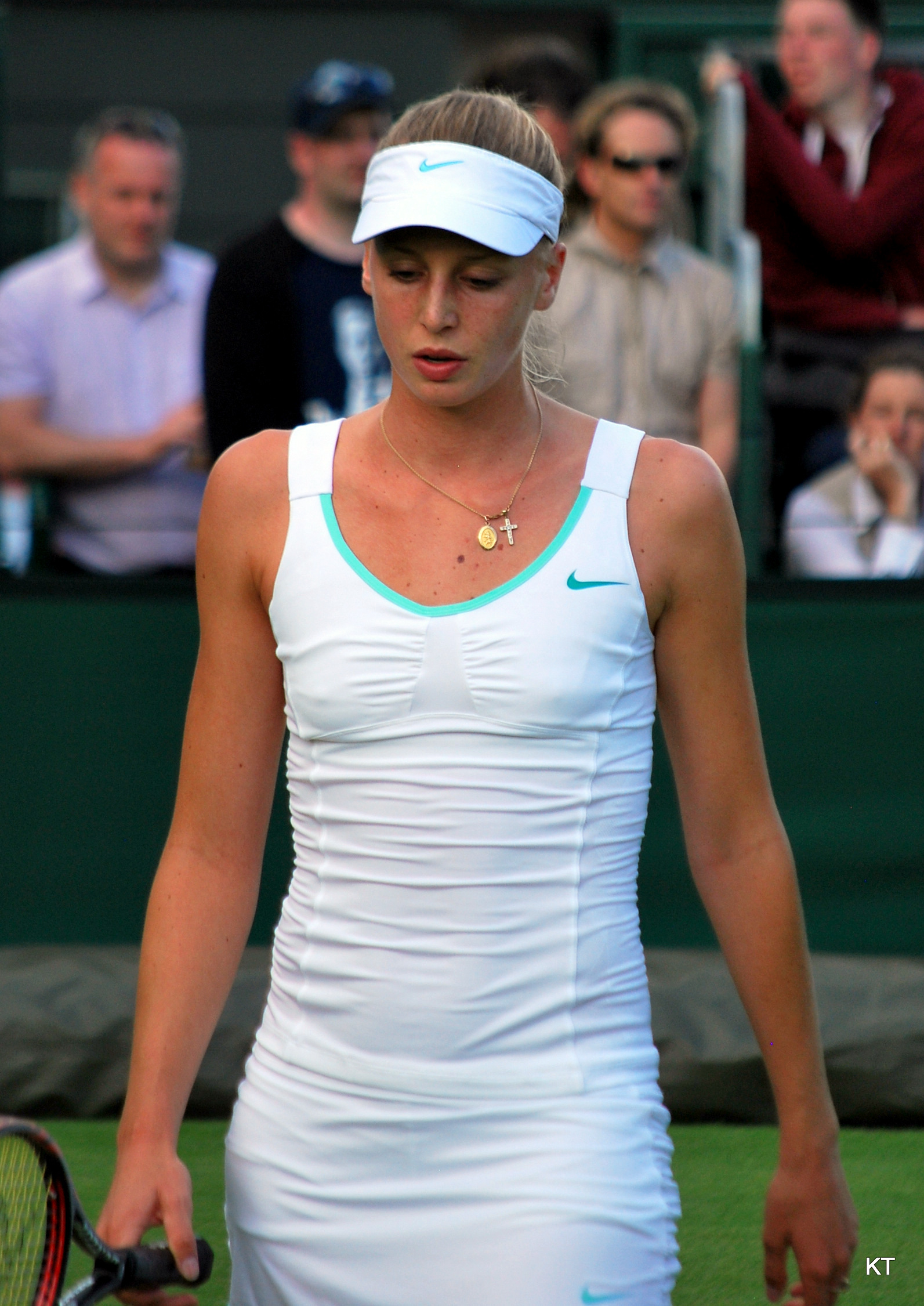
Broady at the 2012 Wimbledon Championships

== Grand Slam singles performance ==
Key
W	F	SF	QF	#R	RR	Q#	DNQ	A	NH

(W) winner; (F) finalist; (SF) semifinalist; (QF) quarterfinalist; (#R) rounds 4, 3, 2, 1; (RR) round-robin stage; (Q#) qualification round; (DNQ) did not qualify; (A) absent; (NH) not held; (SR) strike rate (events won / competed); (W–L) win–loss record.
To avoid confusion and double counting, these charts are updated at the conclusion of a tournament or when the player's participation has ended.

Tournament	2008	2009	2010	2011	2012	2013	2014	2015	2016	2017	2018	2019	W–L
Australian Open	A	A	A	A	Q2	A	A	Q1	Q1	1R	Q2	Q1	0–1
French Open	A	A	A	A	Q1	A	A	Q2	1R	Q1	A	A	0–1
Wimbledon	Q1	Q1	Q1	1R	1R	Q2	2R	1R	1R	1R	1R	Q1	1–7
US Open	A	A	A	Q3	Q1	A	Q1	Q3	2R	Q3	Q2	A	1–1
Win–loss	0–0	0–0	0–0	0–1	0–1	0–0	1–1	0–1	1–3	0–2	0–1	0–0	2–10
