= 2012 ITF Women's Circuit (January–March) =

The 2012 ITF Women's Circuit is the 2012 edition of the third tier tour for women's professional tennis. It is organised by the International Tennis Federation and is a tier below the WTA 125 series. The ITF Women's Circuit includes tournaments with prize money ranging from $10,000 up to $100,000. During the months of January to March 2012, 88 tournaments were held.

== Key ==
$100,000 tournaments
$75,000 tournaments
$50,000 tournaments
$25,000 tournaments
$15,000 tournaments
$10,000 tournaments
All titles

== Month ==
=== January ===
Week of	Tournament	Winner	Runners-up	Semifinalists	Quarterfinalists
January 2	Blossom Cup; Quanzhou, China; Hard $50,000+H; Singles – Doubles	(Japan) Kimiko Date-Krumm; 6–3, 6–3	(Hungary) Tímea Babos	(France) Caroline Garcia (China) Zhou Yimiao	(Russia) Ekaterina Ivanova (China) Wang Qiang (China) Sun Shengnan (China) Zhang Shuai
January 2	Blossom Cup; Quanzhou, China; Hard $50,000+H; Singles – Doubles	(Chinese Taipei) Chan Hao-ching (Japan) Rika Fujiwara; 4–6, 6–4, [10–7]	(Japan) Kimiko Date-Krumm (China) Zhang Shuai	(France) Caroline Garcia (China) Zhou Yimiao	(Russia) Ekaterina Ivanova (China) Wang Qiang (China) Sun Shengnan (China) Zhang Shuai
January 9	Innisbrook, United States; Clay $25,000; Singles and doubles draws	(United States) Grace Min; 2–6, 6–2, 6–4	(United States) Gail Brodsky	(United States) Lauren Davis (United States) Lauren Embree	(United States) Jessica Pegula (France) Laura Thorpe (Ukraine) Irina Buryachok (Venezuela) Gabriela Paz
January 9	Innisbrook, United States; Clay $25,000; Singles and doubles draws	(Belarus) Darya Kustova (Romania) Raluca Olaru; 6–3, 6–1	(Italy) Gioia Barbieri (Russia) Nadejda Guskova	(United States) Lauren Davis (United States) Lauren Embree	(United States) Jessica Pegula (France) Laura Thorpe (Ukraine) Irina Buryachok (Venezuela) Gabriela Paz
January 9	Saint Martin, France; Hard $10,000; Singles and doubles draws	(United States) Yasmin Schnack; 6–7^{(4–7)}, 6–2, 6–1	(France) Amandine Hesse	(Réunion) Pauline Payet (France) Manon Arcangioli	(France) Sherazad Benamar (United States) Eleanor Peters (Russia) Margarita Lazareva (Israel) Keren Shlomo
January 9	Saint Martin, France; Hard $10,000; Singles and doubles draws	(France) Sherazad Benamar (France) Brandy Mina; 6–4, 6–4	(France) Marion Gaud (France) Amandine Hesse	(Réunion) Pauline Payet (France) Manon Arcangioli	(France) Sherazad Benamar (United States) Eleanor Peters (Russia) Margarita Lazareva (Israel) Keren Shlomo
January 9	Glasgow, United Kingdom; Hard $10,000; Singles and doubles draws	(Belgium) Alison Van Uytvanck; 6–3, 6–0	(United Kingdom) Francesca Stephenson	(France) Julie Coin (United Kingdom) Anna Fitzpatrick	(United Kingdom) Lisa Whybourn (Netherlands) Quirine Lemoine (United Kingdom) Samantha Murray (France) Myrtille Georges
January 9	Glasgow, United Kingdom; Hard $10,000; Singles and doubles draws	(United Kingdom) Anna Fitzpatrick (United Kingdom) Samantha Murray; 6–2, 6–3	(United Kingdom) Alexandra Walker (United Kingdom) Lisa Whybourn	(France) Julie Coin (United Kingdom) Anna Fitzpatrick	(United Kingdom) Lisa Whybourn (Netherlands) Quirine Lemoine (United Kingdom) Samantha Murray (France) Myrtille Georges
January 9	Pingguo, China; Hard $25,000; Singles and doubles draws	(China) Zhao Yijing; 6–2, 6–4	(Japan) Erika Takao	(Thailand) Luksika Kumkhum (Chinese Taipei) Chan Chin-wei	(China) Hu Yueyue (China) Zhang Kailin (China) Wang Qiang (Uzbekistan) Nigina Abduraimova
January 9	Pingguo, China; Hard $25,000; Singles and doubles draws	(Chinese Taipei) Kao Shao-yuan (China) Zhao Yijing; 3–6, 7–6^{(7–3)}, [10–7]	(China) Liang Chen (China) Tian Ran	(Thailand) Luksika Kumkhum (Chinese Taipei) Chan Chin-wei	(China) Hu Yueyue (China) Zhang Kailin (China) Wang Qiang (Uzbekistan) Nigina Abduraimova
January 9	Antalya-Kaya Belek, Turkey; Clay $10,000; Singles and doubles draws	(Georgia (country)) Sofia Kvatsabaia; 6–0, 6–2	(Russia) Eugeniya Pashkova	(Serbia) Dunja Šunkić (Russia) Anastasia Frolova	(Romania) Diana Marcu (Croatia) Tena Lukas (Turkey) Hülya Esen (Greece) Agni Stefanou
January 9	Antalya-Kaya Belek, Turkey; Clay $10,000; Singles and doubles draws	(Russia) Anastasia Frolova (Russia) Eugeniya Pashkova; 6–4, 7–6^{(7–2)}	(Romania) Patricia Chirea (Romania) Patricia Maria Țig	(Serbia) Dunja Šunkić (Russia) Anastasia Frolova	(Romania) Diana Marcu (Croatia) Tena Lukas (Turkey) Hülya Esen (Greece) Agni Stefanou
January 16	Plantation, United States; Clay $25,000; Singles and doubles draws	(United States) Lauren Davis; 6–4, 6–1	(United States) Gail Brodsky	(United States) Ahsha Rolle (Australia) Johanna Konta	(Canada) Marie-Ève Pelletier (Ukraine) Elizaveta Ianchuk (Canada) Heidi El Tabakh (United States) Alexandra Stevenson
January 16	Plantation, United States; Clay $25,000; Singles and doubles draws	(Colombia) Catalina Castaño (France) Laura Thorpe; 6–4, 6–2	(United States) Jessica Pegula (United States) Ahsha Rolle	(United States) Ahsha Rolle (Australia) Johanna Konta	(Canada) Marie-Ève Pelletier (Ukraine) Elizaveta Ianchuk (Canada) Heidi El Tabakh (United States) Alexandra Stevenson
January 16	Le Gosier, Guadeloupe; Hard $10,000; Singles and doubles draws	(France) Amandine Hesse; 7–5, 6–1	(Réunion) Pauline Payet	(United States) Yasmin Schnack (Israel) Keren Shlomo	(France) Manon Arcangioli (Slovenia) Jelena Durišić (France) Clothilde de Bernardi (United States) Eleanor Peters
January 16	Le Gosier, Guadeloupe; Hard $10,000; Singles and doubles draws	(United States) Whitney Jones (United States) Yasmin Schnack; 2–6, 6–4, [16–14]	(Russia) Margarita Lazareva (Israel) Keren Shlomo	(United States) Yasmin Schnack (Israel) Keren Shlomo	(France) Manon Arcangioli (Slovenia) Jelena Durišić (France) Clothilde de Bernardi (United States) Eleanor Peters
January 16	Stuttgart-Stammheim, Germany; Hard $10,000; Singles and doubles draws	(Czech Republic) Tereza Smitková; 6–4, 7–6^{(7–4)}	(Ukraine) Maryna Zanevska	(Russia) Alexandra Artamonova (Netherlands) Lesley Kerkhove	(Germany) Franziska Etzel (Czech Republic) Tereza Martincová (Czech Republic) Denisa Allertová (Belgium) Ysaline Bonaventure
January 16	Stuttgart-Stammheim, Germany; Hard $10,000; Singles and doubles draws	(Poland) Paula Kania (Russia) Ksenia Lykina; 6–4, 6–3	(Ukraine) Lyudmyla Kichenok (Ukraine) Nadiya Kichenok	(Russia) Alexandra Artamonova (Netherlands) Lesley Kerkhove	(Germany) Franziska Etzel (Czech Republic) Tereza Martincová (Czech Republic) Denisa Allertová (Belgium) Ysaline Bonaventure
January 16	Coimbra, Portugal; Hard $10,000; Singles and doubles draws	(Russia) Ulyana Ayzatulina; 7–5, 6–1	(United States) Caitlin Whoriskey	(Spain) Olga Sáez Larra (Poland) Magdalena Kiszczyńska	(Norway) Ulrikke Eikeri (Spain) Arabela Fernández Rabener (Sweden) Matilda Hamlin (France) Alix Collombon
January 16	Coimbra, Portugal; Hard $10,000; Singles and doubles draws	(Slovakia) Lucia Butkovská (Norway) Ulrikke Eikeri; 6–3, 6–1	(Sweden) Beatrice Cedermark (Sweden) Matilda Hamlin	(Spain) Olga Sáez Larra (Poland) Magdalena Kiszczyńska	(Norway) Ulrikke Eikeri (Spain) Arabela Fernández Rabener (Sweden) Matilda Hamlin (France) Alix Collombon
January 16	Sutton, United Kingdom; Hard $10,000; Singles and doubles draws	(Netherlands) Richèl Hogenkamp; 6–3, 6–2	(Republic of Ireland) Amy Bowtell	(France) Myrtille Georges (United Kingdom) Lisa Whybourn	(Czech Republic) Klára Kopřivová (United Kingdom) Harriet Dart (France) Elixane Lechemia (United Kingdom) Tara Moore
January 16	Sutton, United Kingdom; Hard $10,000; Singles and doubles draws	(Republic of Ireland) Amy Bowtell (Netherlands) Quirine Lemoine; 7–6^{(7–5)}, 6–3	(France) Elixane Lechemia (France) Irina Ramialison	(France) Myrtille Georges (United Kingdom) Lisa Whybourn	(Czech Republic) Klára Kopřivová (United Kingdom) Harriet Dart (France) Elixane Lechemia (United Kingdom) Tara Moore
January 16	Antalya-Kaya Belek, Turkey; Clay $10,000; Singles and doubles draws	(Georgia (country)) Sofia Kvatsabaia; 7–6^{(7–4)}, 6–1	(Venezuela) Marina Giral Lores	(Russia) Eugeniya Pashkova (Romania) Liana Ungur	(Russia) Anastasia Frolova (Russia) Ekaterina Yashina (Romania) Alexandra Damaschin (France) Gracia Radovanovic
January 16	Antalya-Kaya Belek, Turkey; Clay $10,000; Singles and doubles draws	(Romania) Cristina Dinu (Romania) Andreea Mitu; 7–6^{(7–3)}, 6–2	(Romania) Diana Marcu (Romania) Liana Ungur	(Russia) Eugeniya Pashkova (Romania) Liana Ungur	(Russia) Anastasia Frolova (Russia) Ekaterina Yashina (Romania) Alexandra Damaschin (France) Gracia Radovanovic
January 23	Andrézieux-Bouthéon, France; Hard $25,000; Singles and doubles draws	(Czech Republic) Kristýna Plíšková; 6–2, 6–2	(Italy) Anna Remondina	(Italy) Karin Knapp (Russia) Vesna Dolonc	(Germany) Kristina Barrois (Spain) Lara Arruabarrena Vecino (Czech Republic) Karolína Plíšková (Slovakia) Michaela Hončová
January 23	Andrézieux-Bouthéon, France; Hard $25,000; Singles and doubles draws	(Czech Republic) Karolína Plíšková (Czech Republic) Kristýna Plíšková; 6–4, 4–6, [10–5]	(France) Julie Coin (Czech Republic) Eva Hrdinová	(Italy) Karin Knapp (Russia) Vesna Dolonc	(Germany) Kristina Barrois (Spain) Lara Arruabarrena Vecino (Czech Republic) Karolína Plíšková (Slovakia) Michaela Hončová
January 23	Coimbra, Portugal; Hard $10,000; Singles and doubles draws	(Norway) Ulrikke Eikeri; 2–6, 7–5, 6–3	(Poland) Justyna Jegiołka	(Italy) Nicole Clerico (France) Estelle Guisard	(Czech Republic) Nikola Horáková (Portugal) Margarida Moura (France) Amandine Cazeaux (Poland) Magdalena Kiszczyńska
January 23	Coimbra, Portugal; Hard $10,000; Singles and doubles draws	(Slovakia) Lucia Butkovská (Norway) Ulrikke Eikeri; 6–3, 6–0	(Italy) Martina Caciotti (Italy) Nicole Clerico	(Italy) Nicole Clerico (France) Estelle Guisard	(Czech Republic) Nikola Horáková (Portugal) Margarida Moura (France) Amandine Cazeaux (Poland) Magdalena Kiszczyńska
January 23	Kaarst, Germany; Carpet $10,000; Singles and doubles draws	(Germany) Dinah Pfizenmaier; 6–4, 6–4	(Belgium) Alison Van Uytvanck	(Germany) Laura Siegemund (Germany) Jana Nabel	(Russia) Alexandra Artamonova (Germany) Anna-Lena Friedsam (Slovenia) Anja Prislan (Russia) Margarita Gasparyan
January 23	Kaarst, Germany; Carpet $10,000; Singles and doubles draws	(Russia) Margarita Gasparyan (Russia) Anna Smolina; 6–7^{(2–7)}, 6–2, [10–8]	(Russia) Alexandra Artamonova (Russia) Marina Melnikova	(Germany) Laura Siegemund (Germany) Jana Nabel	(Russia) Alexandra Artamonova (Germany) Anna-Lena Friedsam (Slovenia) Anja Prislan (Russia) Margarita Gasparyan
January 23	Mallorca, Spain; Clay $10,000; Singles and doubles draws	(Italy) Anastasia Grymalska; 6–1, 6–4	(Poland) Barbara Sobaszkiewicz	(Spain) Pilar Domínguez López (Germany) Jasmin Steinherr	(Moldova) Anastasia Vdovenco (Spain) Yvonne Cavallé Reimers (Georgia (country)) Sofia Kvatsabaia (Germany) Anne Schäfer
January 23	Mallorca, Spain; Clay $10,000; Singles and doubles draws	(Italy) Anastasia Grymalska (Poland) Barbara Sobaszkiewicz; 7–6^{(8–6)}, 2–6, [10–7]	(Czech Republic) Simona Dobrá (Czech Republic) Lucie Kriegsmannová	(Spain) Pilar Domínguez López (Germany) Jasmin Steinherr	(Moldova) Anastasia Vdovenco (Spain) Yvonne Cavallé Reimers (Georgia (country)) Sofia Kvatsabaia (Germany) Anne Schäfer
January 23	Antalya-Kaya Belek, Turkey; Clay $10,000; Singles and doubles draws	(Romania) Cristina Dinu; 7–5, 6–3	(Romania) Liana Ungur	(Belarus) Ksenia Milevskaya (Ukraine) Marianna Zakarlyuk	(Croatia) Tena Lukas (Turkey) Başak Eraydın (Romania) Andreea Mitu (Belarus) Ilona Kremen
January 23	Antalya-Kaya Belek, Turkey; Clay $10,000; Singles and doubles draws	(Romania) Cristina Dinu (Romania) Andreea Mitu; Walkover	(Japan) Yumi Nakano (Russia) Ekaterina Yashina	(Belarus) Ksenia Milevskaya (Ukraine) Marianna Zakarlyuk	(Croatia) Tena Lukas (Turkey) Başak Eraydın (Romania) Andreea Mitu (Belarus) Ilona Kremen
January 30	Grenoble, France; Hard $25,000; Singles and doubles draws	(Czech Republic) Karolína Plíšková; 7–6^{(13–11)}, 7–6^{(8–6)}	(Czech Republic) Kristýna Plíšková	(Ukraine) Maryna Zanevska (Czech Republic) Sandra Záhlavová	(France) Julie Coin (Germany) Tatjana Malek (United Kingdom) Naomi Broady (Ukraine) Valentyna Ivakhnenko
January 30	Grenoble, France; Hard $25,000; Singles and doubles draws	(Czech Republic) Karolína Plíšková (Czech Republic) Kristýna Plíšková; 6–1, 6–3	(Ukraine) Valentyna Ivakhnenko (Ukraine) Maryna Zanevska	(Ukraine) Maryna Zanevska (Czech Republic) Sandra Záhlavová	(France) Julie Coin (Germany) Tatjana Malek (United Kingdom) Naomi Broady (Ukraine) Valentyna Ivakhnenko
January 30	Sunderland, United Kingdom; Hard $25,000; Singles and doubles draws	(Germany) Sarah Gronert; 3–6, 6–2, 6–3	(Germany) Annika Beck	(Ukraine) Tetyana Arefyeva (Croatia) Ana Vrljić	(Latvia) Diāna Marcinkēviča (United Kingdom) Francesca Stephenson (France) Irena Pavlovic (Slovakia) Michaela Hončová
January 30	Sunderland, United Kingdom; Hard $25,000; Singles and doubles draws	(Poland) Justyna Jegiołka (Latvia) Diāna Marcinkēviča; 6–4, 2–6, [10–6]	(Italy) Martina Caciotti (Italy) Anastasia Grymalska	(Ukraine) Tetyana Arefyeva (Croatia) Ana Vrljić	(Latvia) Diāna Marcinkēviča (United Kingdom) Francesca Stephenson (France) Irena Pavlovic (Slovakia) Michaela Hončová
January 30	Rancho Santa Fe, United States; Hard $25,000; Singles and doubles draws	(United States) Julia Boserup; 6–0, 6–3	(United States) Lauren Davis	(United States) Krista Hardebeck (United States) Alexa Glatch	(China) Lu Jingjing (United States) Maria Sanchez (Canada) Heidi El Tabakh (United States) Madison Brengle
January 30	Rancho Santa Fe, United States; Hard $25,000; Singles and doubles draws	(United States) Maria Sanchez (United States) Yasmin Schnack; 7–6^{(7–4)}, 4–6, [10–8]	(Ukraine) Irina Buryachok (Ukraine) Elizaveta Ianchuk	(United States) Krista Hardebeck (United States) Alexa Glatch	(China) Lu Jingjing (United States) Maria Sanchez (Canada) Heidi El Tabakh (United States) Madison Brengle
January 30	Mallorca, Spain; Clay $10,000; Singles and doubles draws	(Georgia (country)) Sofia Kvatsabaia; 6–2, 6–3	(Spain) Yvonne Cavallé Reimers	(Italy) Valeria Prosperi (Spain) Pilar Domínguez López	(Germany) Anne Schäfer (Russia) Daria Salnikova (Czech Republic) Jana Jandová (Spain) Olga Sáez Larra
January 30	Mallorca, Spain; Clay $10,000; Singles and doubles draws	(Spain) Yvonne Cavallé Reimers (Spain) Lucía Cervera Vázquez; 7–5, 6–4	(Italy) Alice Balducci (Germany) Anne Schäfer	(Italy) Valeria Prosperi (Spain) Pilar Domínguez López	(Germany) Anne Schäfer (Russia) Daria Salnikova (Czech Republic) Jana Jandová (Spain) Olga Sáez Larra
January 30	McDonald's Burnie International; Burnie, Australia; Hard $25,000; Singles and doubles draws	(Australia) Olivia Rogowska; 6–3, 6–3	(Russia) Irina Khromacheva	(Japan) Yurika Sema (Australia) Bojana Bobusic	(Russia) Arina Rodionova (Canada) Eugenie Bouchard (Australia) Monique Adamczak (Japan) Shuko Aoyama
January 30	McDonald's Burnie International; Burnie, Australia; Hard $25,000; Singles and doubles draws	(Russia) Arina Rodionova (United Kingdom) Melanie South; 6–2, 6–2	(Australia) Stephanie Bengson (Australia) Tyra Calderwood	(Japan) Yurika Sema (Australia) Bojana Bobusic	(Russia) Arina Rodionova (Canada) Eugenie Bouchard (Australia) Monique Adamczak (Japan) Shuko Aoyama
January 30	Antalya-Kaya Belek, Turkey; Clay $10,000; Singles and doubles draws	(Netherlands) Daniëlle Harmsen; 6–3, 6–4	(Italy) Martina Di Giuseppe	(Belarus) Ksenia Milevskaya (Romania) Diana Enache	(Japan) Chihiro Nunome (Ukraine) Vladyslava Zanosiyenko (Serbia) Saška Gavrilovska (Kazakhstan) Yelena Nemchen
January 30	Antalya-Kaya Belek, Turkey; Clay $10,000; Singles and doubles draws	(Romania) Diana Enache (Netherlands) Daniëlle Harmsen; 6–0, 1–6, [10–6]	(Belarus) Ilona Kremen (Japan) Emi Mutaguchi	(Belarus) Ksenia Milevskaya (Romania) Diana Enache	(Japan) Chihiro Nunome (Ukraine) Vladyslava Zanosiyenko (Serbia) Saška Gavrilovska (Kazakhstan) Yelena Nemchen

=== February ===
Week of	Tournament	Winner	Runners-up	Semifinalists	Quarterfinalists
February 6	Copa Bionaire; Cali, Colombia; Clay $100,000+H; Singles – Doubles	(Romania) Alexandra Dulgheru; 6–3, 1–6, 6–3	(Luxembourg) Mandy Minella	(Kazakhstan) Sesil Karatantcheva (Spain) Lourdes Domínguez Lino	(United States) Julia Cohen (Germany) Kathrin Wörle (Russia) Alexandra Panova (Romania) Alexandra Cadanțu
February 6	Copa Bionaire; Cali, Colombia; Clay $100,000+H; Singles – Doubles	(Italy) Karin Knapp (Luxembourg) Mandy Minella; 6–4, 6–3	(Romania) Alexandra Cadanțu (Romania) Raluca Olaru	(Kazakhstan) Sesil Karatantcheva (Spain) Lourdes Domínguez Lino	(United States) Julia Cohen (Germany) Kathrin Wörle (Russia) Alexandra Panova (Romania) Alexandra Cadanțu
February 6	Dow Corning Tennis Classic; Midland, United States; Hard $100,000; Singles – Doubles	(Belarus) Olga Govortsova; 6–3, 6–7^{(6–8)}, 7–6^{(7–5)}	(Slovakia) Magdaléna Rybáriková	(United States) Jamie Hampton (Russia) Evgeniya Rodina	(Czech Republic) Lucie Hradecká (Georgia (country)) Anna Tatishvili (United States) Madison Brengle (United States) Gail Brodsky
February 6	Dow Corning Tennis Classic; Midland, United States; Hard $100,000; Singles – Doubles	(Czech Republic) Andrea Hlaváčková (Czech Republic) Lucie Hradecká; 7–6^{(7–4)}, 6–2	(Russia) Vesna Dolonc (France) Stéphanie Foretz Gacon	(United States) Jamie Hampton (Russia) Evgeniya Rodina	(Czech Republic) Lucie Hradecká (Georgia (country)) Anna Tatishvili (United States) Madison Brengle (United States) Gail Brodsky
February 6	Rancho Mirage, United States; Hard $25,000; Singles and doubles draws	(Australia) Johanna Konta; 6–0, 6–4	(Slovakia) Lenka Wienerová	(United States) Amanda Fink (Russia) Valeria Solovyeva	(France) Claire Feuerstein (Slovakia) Zuzana Zlochová (United States) Lauren Davis (United States) Allie Kiick
February 6	Rancho Mirage, United States; Hard $25,000; Singles and doubles draws	(Georgia (country)) Ekaterine Gorgodze (Georgia (country)) Sofia Shapatava; 6–2, 3–6, [10–6]	(Russia) Valeria Solovyeva (Slovakia) Lenka Wienerová	(United States) Amanda Fink (Russia) Valeria Solovyeva	(France) Claire Feuerstein (Slovakia) Zuzana Zlochová (United States) Lauren Davis (United States) Allie Kiick
February 6	Sharm el-Sheikh, Egypt; Hard $10,000; Singles and doubles draws	(Hong Kong) Venise Chan; 7–5, 1–6, 6–1	(Netherlands) Lynn Schönhage	(Austria) Barbara Haas (Russia) Aminat Kushkhova	(Spain) Rocío de la Torre Sánchez (Russia) Polina Leykina (Croatia) Indire Akiki (Russia) Julia Samuseva
February 6	Sharm el-Sheikh, Egypt; Hard $10,000; Singles and doubles draws	(Russia) Natela Dzalamidze (Ukraine) Khristina Kazimova; 6–4, 7–5	(Spain) Rocío de la Torre Sánchez (Germany) Christina Shakovets	(Austria) Barbara Haas (Russia) Aminat Kushkhova	(Spain) Rocío de la Torre Sánchez (Russia) Polina Leykina (Croatia) Indire Akiki (Russia) Julia Samuseva
February 6	Vale do Lobo, Portugal; Hard $10,000; Singles and doubles draws	(France) Estelle Guisard; 6–2, 6–1	(Japan) Hiroko Kuwata	(France) Charlène Seateun (Czech Republic) Tereza Malíková	(Italy) Alice Savoretti (Germany) Justine Ozga (France) Morgane Pons (Japan) Ai Koga
February 6	Vale do Lobo, Portugal; Hard $10,000; Singles and doubles draws	(Czech Republic) Nikola Horáková (Czech Republic) Tereza Malíková; 6–2, 6–2	(United States) Rosalia Alda (Israel) Ekaterina Tour	(France) Charlène Seateun (Czech Republic) Tereza Malíková	(Italy) Alice Savoretti (Germany) Justine Ozga (France) Morgane Pons (Japan) Ai Koga
February 6	Launceston, Australia; Hard $25,000; Singles and doubles draws	(Russia) Yulia Putintseva; 6–1, 6–3	(Netherlands) Lesley Kerkhove	(Slovakia) Anna Karolína Schmiedlová (Netherlands) Richèl Hogenkamp	(Australia) Olivia Rogowska (China) Han Xinyun (Japan) Akiko Omae (Australia) Viktorija Rajicic
February 6	Launceston, Australia; Hard $25,000; Singles and doubles draws	(Japan) Shuko Aoyama (Japan) Kotomi Takahata; 6–4, 6–4	(Chinese Taipei) Hsieh Shu-ying (China) Zheng Saisai	(Slovakia) Anna Karolína Schmiedlová (Netherlands) Richèl Hogenkamp	(Australia) Olivia Rogowska (China) Han Xinyun (Japan) Akiko Omae (Australia) Viktorija Rajicic
February 6	Antalya-Kaya Belek, Turkey; Clay $10,000; Singles and doubles draws	(Romania) Cristina Dinu; 6–1, 6–1	(Romania) Diana Enache	(Japan) Eri Hozumi (Russia) Marina Shamayko	(France) Nathalie Piquion (Serbia) Natalija Kostić (Japan) Mari Tanaka (Netherlands) Daniëlle Harmsen
February 6	Antalya-Kaya Belek, Turkey; Clay $10,000; Singles and doubles draws	(Romania) Diana Enache (Netherlands) Daniëlle Harmsen; 7–6^{(7–5)}, 6–1	(Turkey) Seda Arantekin (Turkey) Hülya Esen	(Japan) Eri Hozumi (Russia) Marina Shamayko	(France) Nathalie Piquion (Serbia) Natalija Kostić (Japan) Mari Tanaka (Netherlands) Daniëlle Harmsen
February 6	Riviera de São Lourenço, Brazil; Hard $25,000; Singles and doubles draws	(Brazil) Roxane Vaisemberg; 6–1, 6–1	(Peru) Bianca Botto	(Argentina) Florencia Molinero (Paraguay) Verónica Cepede Royg	(Argentina) Mailen Auroux (Argentina) María Irigoyen (Canada) Marie-Ève Pelletier (Brazil) Carla Forte
February 6	Riviera de São Lourenço, Brazil; Hard $25,000; Singles and doubles draws	(Argentina) Mailen Auroux (Argentina) María Irigoyen; 6–3, 6–1	(Paraguay) Verónica Cepede Royg (Argentina) Florencia Molinero	(Argentina) Florencia Molinero (Paraguay) Verónica Cepede Royg	(Argentina) Mailen Auroux (Argentina) María Irigoyen (Canada) Marie-Ève Pelletier (Brazil) Carla Forte
February 13	Surprise, United States; Hard $25,000; Singles and doubles draws	(Portugal) Michelle Larcher de Brito; 6–1, 6–3	(France) Claire Feuerstein	(United States) Maria Sanchez (Canada) Heidi El Tabakh	(Russia) Olga Puchkova (Czech Republic) Andrea Hlaváčková (United States) Grace Min (France) Stéphanie Foretz Gacon
February 13	Surprise, United States; Hard $25,000; Singles and doubles draws	(United States) Maria Sanchez (United States) Yasmin Schnack; 6–4, 6–3	(Romania) Mihaela Buzărnescu (Russia) Valeria Solovyeva	(United States) Maria Sanchez (Canada) Heidi El Tabakh	(Russia) Olga Puchkova (Czech Republic) Andrea Hlaváčková (United States) Grace Min (France) Stéphanie Foretz Gacon
February 13	Leimen, Germany; Hard $10,000; Singles and doubles draws	(Austria) Melanie Klaffner; 2–6, 7–6^{(7–5)}, 6–1	(Czech Republic) Tereza Smitková	(Germany) Anna Zaja (Czech Republic) Tereza Martincová	(Czech Republic) Barbora Krejčíková (Germany) Anna-Lena Friedsam (Switzerland) Belinda Bencic (France) Amandine Hesse
February 13	Leimen, Germany; Hard $10,000; Singles and doubles draws	(Germany) Anna-Lena Friedsam (Germany) Julia Kimmelmann; 6–1, 7–6^{(7–4)}	(Belgium) Elyne Boeykens (Germany) Jana Nabel	(Germany) Anna Zaja (Czech Republic) Tereza Martincová	(Czech Republic) Barbora Krejčíková (Germany) Anna-Lena Friedsam (Switzerland) Belinda Bencic (France) Amandine Hesse
February 13	Sharm el-Sheikh, Egypt; Hard $10,000; Singles and doubles draws	(Russia) Natela Dzalamidze; 6–3, 6–7^{(3–7)}, 6–0	(Austria) Barbara Haas	(Hong Kong) Venise Chan (Russia) Aminat Kushkhova	(Spain) Rocío de la Torre Sánchez (Switzerland) Lara Michel (Germany) Jasmin Steinherr (Russia) Ksenia Kirillova
February 13	Sharm el-Sheikh, Egypt; Hard $10,000; Singles and doubles draws	(Croatia) Indire Akiki (Ukraine) Anastasia Kharchenko; 6–3, 6–3	(Russia) Natela Dzalamidze (Ukraine) Khristina Kazimova	(Hong Kong) Venise Chan (Russia) Aminat Kushkhova	(Spain) Rocío de la Torre Sánchez (Switzerland) Lara Michel (Germany) Jasmin Steinherr (Russia) Ksenia Kirillova
February 13	Tallinn, Estonia; Hard $10,000; Singles and doubles draws	(Republic of Ireland) Amy Bowtell; 7–6^{(7–5)}, 6–4	(Russia) Polina Vinogradova	(Czech Republic) Petra Krejsová (Netherlands) Indy de Vroome	(Poland) Katarzyna Piter (Belarus) Darya Lebesheva (Russia) Daria Mironova (France) Lou Brouleau
February 13	Tallinn, Estonia; Hard $10,000; Singles and doubles draws	(Slovakia) Lucia Butkovská (Netherlands) Eva Wacanno; 6–4, 7–6^{(9–7)}	(Belarus) Darya Lebesheva (Russia) Julia Valetova	(Czech Republic) Petra Krejsová (Netherlands) Indy de Vroome	(Poland) Katarzyna Piter (Belarus) Darya Lebesheva (Russia) Daria Mironova (France) Lou Brouleau
February 13	Rabat, Morocco; Clay $25,000; Singles and doubles draws	(Bosnia and Herzegovina) Jasmina Tinjić; 7–6^{(7–4)}, 2–6, 7–5	(Belgium) Kirsten Flipkens	(Italy) Anastasia Grymalska (Slovakia) Jana Čepelová	(Italy) Carolina Pillot (Spain) María Teresa Torró Flor (Belarus) Ilona Kremen (Bulgaria) Elitsa Kostova
February 13	Rabat, Morocco; Clay $25,000; Singles and doubles draws	(Slovakia) Jana Čepelová (Hungary) Réka-Luca Jani; 6–7^{(4–7)}, 6–1, [10–4]	(Italy) Anastasia Grymalska (Belarus) Ilona Kremen	(Italy) Anastasia Grymalska (Slovakia) Jana Čepelová	(Italy) Carolina Pillot (Spain) María Teresa Torró Flor (Belarus) Ilona Kremen (Bulgaria) Elitsa Kostova
February 13	Sydney, Australia; Hard $25,000; Singles and doubles draws	(Australia) Ashleigh Barty; 6–1, 6–3	(Australia) Olivia Rogowska	(Poland) Sandra Zaniewska (Netherlands) Richèl Hogenkamp	(Japan) Risa Ozaki (Japan) Aiko Nakamura (Germany) Nicola Geuer (China) Zheng Saisai
February 13	Sydney, Australia; Hard $25,000; Singles and doubles draws	(Russia) Arina Rodionova (United Kingdom) Melanie South; 3–6, 6–3, [10–8]	(China) Duan Yingying (China) Han Xinyun	(Poland) Sandra Zaniewska (Netherlands) Richèl Hogenkamp	(Japan) Risa Ozaki (Japan) Aiko Nakamura (Germany) Nicola Geuer (China) Zheng Saisai
February 13	Linköping, Sweden; Hard $10,000; Singles and doubles draws	(Russia) Marta Sirotkina; 6–1, 6–3	(Serbia) Milana Špremo	(Sweden) Hilda Melander (Italy) Angelica Moratelli	(Switzerland) Tess Sugnaux (Sweden) Beatrice Cedermark (Sweden) Jacqueline Cabaj Awad (Norway) Emma Flood
February 13	Linköping, Sweden; Hard $10,000; Singles and doubles draws	(Germany) Dejana Raickovic (Germany) Alina Wessel; 1–6, 6–3, [10–8]	(Russia) Margarita Lazareva (Russia) Marta Sirotkina	(Sweden) Hilda Melander (Italy) Angelica Moratelli	(Switzerland) Tess Sugnaux (Sweden) Beatrice Cedermark (Sweden) Jacqueline Cabaj Awad (Norway) Emma Flood
February 13	Antalya-Kaya Belek, Turkey; Hard $10,000; Singles and doubles draws	(Ukraine) Yuliya Beygelzimer; 7–5, 7–5	(Romania) Liana Ungur	(Chinese Taipei) Lee Hua-chen (Japan) Eri Hozumi	(Spain) Yvonne Cavallé Reimers (Italy) Martina Caregaro (Serbia) Natalija Kostić (South Africa) Natasha Fourouclas
February 13	Antalya-Kaya Belek, Turkey; Hard $10,000; Singles and doubles draws	(China) Yang Zhaoxuan (China) Zhang Kailin; 7–6^{(8–6)}, 5–7, [10–8]	(China) Li Yihong (China) Tang Haochen	(Chinese Taipei) Lee Hua-chen (Japan) Eri Hozumi	(Spain) Yvonne Cavallé Reimers (Italy) Martina Caregaro (Serbia) Natalija Kostić (South Africa) Natasha Fourouclas
February 13	Portimão, Portugal; Hard $10,000; Singles and doubles draws	(Germany) Justine Ozga; 4–6, 6–1, 6–1	(Russia) Elena Bovina	(Spain) Lucía Cervera Vázquez (Spain) Nuria Párrizas Díaz	(Spain) Silvia García Jiménez (Spain) Arabela Fernández Rabener (Belgium) Désirée Bastianon (Japan) Ai Koga
February 13	Portimão, Portugal; Hard $10,000; Singles and doubles draws	(Czech Republic) Nikola Horáková (Czech Republic) Tereza Malíková; 6–3, 2–6, [10–5]	(Slovenia) Anja Prislan (Netherlands) Lisanne van Riet	(Spain) Lucía Cervera Vázquez (Spain) Nuria Párrizas Díaz	(Spain) Silvia García Jiménez (Spain) Arabela Fernández Rabener (Belgium) Désirée Bastianon (Japan) Ai Koga
February 20	Mâcon, France; Hard $10,000; Singles and doubles draws	(Ukraine) Maryna Zanevska; 6–1, 6–2	(Croatia) Ema Mikulčić	(Ukraine) Anastasiya Vasylyeva (Italy) Giulia Gatto-Monticone	(France) Julie Coin (France) Irina Ramialison (France) Céline Ghesquière (France) Myrtille Georges
February 20	Mâcon, France; Hard $10,000; Singles and doubles draws	(Italy) Giulia Gatto-Monticone (Slovakia) Michaela Hončová; 6–4, 1–6, [10–5]	(Netherlands) Kim Kilsdonk (Netherlands) Nicolette van Uitert	(Ukraine) Anastasiya Vasylyeva (Italy) Giulia Gatto-Monticone	(France) Julie Coin (France) Irina Ramialison (France) Céline Ghesquière (France) Myrtille Georges
February 20	Sharm el-Sheikh, Egypt; Hard $10,000; Singles and doubles draws	(Russia) Ksenia Kirillova; 7–5, 6–4	(Russia) Natela Dzalamidze	(Germany) Jasmin Steinherr (Romania) Elena-Teodora Cadar	(Spain) Rocío de la Torre Sánchez (Hong Kong) Venise Chan (Russia) Aminat Kushkhova (Austria) Janina Toljan
February 20	Sharm el-Sheikh, Egypt; Hard $10,000; Singles and doubles draws	(Russia) Natela Dzalamidze (Ukraine) Khristina Kazimova; 6–0, 7–6^{(7–4)}	(Russia) Sofia Dmitrieva (Russia) Polina Leykina	(Germany) Jasmin Steinherr (Romania) Elena-Teodora Cadar	(Spain) Rocío de la Torre Sánchez (Hong Kong) Venise Chan (Russia) Aminat Kushkhova (Austria) Janina Toljan
February 20	Tallinn, Estonia; Hard $10,000; Singles and doubles draws	(Estonia) Anett Kontaveit; 7–5, 6–4	(Poland) Katarzyna Piter	(Belarus) Aliaksandra Sasnovich (Netherlands) Eva Wacanno	(Germany) Anna Zaja (Russia) Polina Vinogradova (Russia) Daria Mironova (Switzerland) Viktorija Golubic
February 20	Tallinn, Estonia; Hard $10,000; Singles and doubles draws	(France) Lou Brouleau (Belarus) Aliaksandra Sasnovich; 6–3, 6–2	(Russia) Olga Kalyuzhnaya (Netherlands) Jaimy-Gayle van de Wal	(Belarus) Aliaksandra Sasnovich (Netherlands) Eva Wacanno	(Germany) Anna Zaja (Russia) Polina Vinogradova (Russia) Daria Mironova (Switzerland) Viktorija Golubic
February 20	Mildura, Australia; Grass $25,000; Singles and doubles draws	(Australia) Ashleigh Barty; 6–1, 7–6^{(10–8)}	(Australia) Viktorija Rajicic	(Russia) Arina Rodionova (China) Han Xinyun	(Australia) Sally Peers (Russia) Ksenia Lykina (Netherlands) Lesley Kerkhove (Australia) Monique Adamczak
February 20	Mildura, Australia; Grass $25,000; Singles and doubles draws	(Bosnia and Herzegovina) Mervana Jugić-Salkić (Russia) Ksenia Lykina; 5–7, 7–5, [10–7]	(Australia) Stephanie Bengson (Australia) Tyra Calderwood	(Russia) Arina Rodionova (China) Han Xinyun	(Australia) Sally Peers (Russia) Ksenia Lykina (Netherlands) Lesley Kerkhove (Australia) Monique Adamczak
February 20	Helsingborg, Sweden; Carpet $10,000; Singles and doubles draws	(Netherlands) Quirine Lemoine; 6–4, 6–4	(Czech Republic) Eva Hrdinová	(Russia) Karina Isayan (Slovakia) Nikola Vajdová	(Belarus) Darya Shulzhanok (Republic of Ireland) Amy Bowtell (Sweden) Hilda Melander (Sweden) Eveliina Virtanen
February 20	Helsingborg, Sweden; Carpet $10,000; Singles and doubles draws	(Republic of Ireland) Amy Bowtell (Netherlands) Quirine Lemoine; 6–3, 6–4	(Sweden) Matilda Hamlin (Sweden) Valeria Osadchenko	(Russia) Karina Isayan (Slovakia) Nikola Vajdová	(Belarus) Darya Shulzhanok (Republic of Ireland) Amy Bowtell (Sweden) Hilda Melander (Sweden) Eveliina Virtanen
February 20	Moscow, Russia; Hard $25,000; Singles and doubles draws	(Germany) Annika Beck; 6–1, 7–5	(Belgium) Kirsten Flipkens	(Russia) Daria Gavrilova (Russia) Ekaterina Bychkova	(Germany) Dinah Pfizenmaier (Ukraine) Kateryna Kozlova (Turkey) Çağla Büyükakçay (Russia) Marta Sirotkina
February 20	Moscow, Russia; Hard $25,000; Singles and doubles draws	(Georgia (country)) Oksana Kalashnikova (Russia) Marta Sirotkina; 7–6^{(7–2)}, 4–6, [11–9]	(Russia) Tatiana Kotelnikova (Belarus) Lidziya Marozava	(Russia) Daria Gavrilova (Russia) Ekaterina Bychkova	(Germany) Dinah Pfizenmaier (Ukraine) Kateryna Kozlova (Turkey) Çağla Büyükakçay (Russia) Marta Sirotkina
February 20	Antalya-Kaya Belek, Turkey; Clay $10,000; Singles and doubles draws	(Romania) Andreea Mitu; 6–3, 6–0	(Japan) Mana Ayukawa	(Ukraine) Yuliya Beygelzimer (China) Tian Ran	(Italy) Martina Caregaro (Italy) Alice Balducci (Spain) Yvonne Cavallé Reimers (Romania) Liana Ungur
February 20	Antalya-Kaya Belek, Turkey; Clay $10,000; Singles and doubles draws	(Ukraine) Yuliya Beygelzimer (Belarus) Ksenia Milevskaya; 6–3, 7–6^{(7–4)}	(Chinese Taipei) Lee Hua-chen (Chinese Taipei) Lee Pei-chi	(Ukraine) Yuliya Beygelzimer (China) Tian Ran	(Italy) Martina Caregaro (Italy) Alice Balducci (Spain) Yvonne Cavallé Reimers (Romania) Liana Ungur
February 27	Bron, France; Hard $10,000; Singles and doubles draws	(Ukraine) Maryna Zanevska; 5–7, 7–6^{(7–2)}, 6–3	(Ukraine) Anastasiya Vasylyeva	(France) Océane Dodin (France) Myrtille Georges	(France) Gaëlle Desperrier (Latvia) Diāna Marcinkēviča (France) Amandine Hesse (France) Fiona Ferro
February 27	Bron, France; Hard $10,000; Singles and doubles draws	(Latvia) Diāna Marcinkēviča (Greece) Despina Papamichail; 7–5, 7–5	(Germany) Justine Ozga (Bulgaria) Isabella Shinikova	(France) Océane Dodin (France) Myrtille Georges	(France) Gaëlle Desperrier (Latvia) Diāna Marcinkēviča (France) Amandine Hesse (France) Fiona Ferro
February 27	Wellington, New Zealand; Hard $25,000; Singles and doubles draws	(China) Duan Yingying; 6–1, 6–4	(Poland) Sandra Zaniewska	(South Africa) Chanel Simmonds (China) Hu Yueyue	(South Korea) Han Sung-hee (Japan) Risa Ozaki (Germany) Nicola Geuer (Japan) Makoto Ninomiya
February 27	Wellington, New Zealand; Hard $25,000; Singles and doubles draws	(United Kingdom) Anna Fitzpatrick (South Africa) Chanel Simmonds; 6–3, 6–4	(South Korea) Han Sung-hee (Japan) Yurina Koshino	(South Africa) Chanel Simmonds (China) Hu Yueyue	(South Korea) Han Sung-hee (Japan) Risa Ozaki (Germany) Nicola Geuer (Japan) Makoto Ninomiya
February 27	Antalya-Kaya Belek, Turkey; Clay $10,000; Singles and doubles draws	(Croatia) Ana Savić; 6–3, 6–4	(Italy) Gioia Barbieri	(Romania) Andreea Mitu (Venezuela) Andrea Gámiz	(Italy) Carolina Pillot (Ukraine) Marianna Zakarlyuk (Italy) Claudia Giovine (Belarus) Ksenia Milevskaya
February 27	Antalya-Kaya Belek, Turkey; Clay $10,000; Singles and doubles draws	(Italy) Claudia Giovine (Germany) Anne Schäfer; 6–3, 3–6, [10–7]	(United States) Sanaz Marand (United Kingdom) Nicola Slater	(Romania) Andreea Mitu (Venezuela) Andrea Gámiz	(Italy) Carolina Pillot (Ukraine) Marianna Zakarlyuk (Italy) Claudia Giovine (Belarus) Ksenia Milevskaya

=== March ===
Week of	Tournament	Winner	Runners-up	Semifinalists	Quarterfinalists
March 5	Fort Walton Beach, United States; Hard $25,000; Singles and doubles draws	(United States) Madison Brengle; 6–4, 3–6, 6–3	(Croatia) Tereza Mrdeža	(Poland) Marta Domachowska (Italy) Camila Giorgi	(United States) Sachia Vickery (United States) Allie Kiick (Canada) Eugenie Bouchard (Russia) Elena Bovina
March 5	Fort Walton Beach, United States; Hard $25,000; Singles and doubles draws	(United States) Madison Brengle (Poland) Paula Kania; 6–3, 6–4	(Russia) Elena Bovina (France) Alizé Lim	(Poland) Marta Domachowska (Italy) Camila Giorgi	(United States) Sachia Vickery (United States) Allie Kiick (Canada) Eugenie Bouchard (Russia) Elena Bovina
March 5	Dijon, France; Hard $10,000; Singles and doubles draws	(Ukraine) Maryna Zanevska; 6–4, 6–4	(Latvia) Diāna Marcinkēviča	(Germany) Justine Ozga (France) Audrey Bergot	(France) Constance Sibille (France) Jennifer Zerbone (United Kingdom) Samantha Murray (France) Océane Dodin
March 5	Dijon, France; Hard $10,000; Singles and doubles draws	(Latvia) Diāna Marcinkēviča (Greece) Despina Papamichail; 7–5, 7–6^{(9–7)}	(Russia) Yana Sizikova (Belgium) Alison Van Uytvanck	(Germany) Justine Ozga (France) Audrey Bergot	(France) Constance Sibille (France) Jennifer Zerbone (United Kingdom) Samantha Murray (France) Océane Dodin
March 5	Antalya, Turkey; Clay $10,000; Singles and doubles draws	(Croatia) Ana Savić; 6–2, 4–6, 6–2	(Italy) Martina Di Giuseppe	(Italy) Evelyn Mayr (Germany) Anne Schäfer	(Romania) Cristina Dinu (Italy) Gioia Barbieri (Italy) Andreea Văideanu (Italy) Anastasia Grymalska
March 5	Antalya, Turkey; Clay $10,000; Singles and doubles draws	(Romania) Cristina Dinu (Romania) Diana Enache; 6–0, 5–7, [10–3]	(Russia) Angelina Gabueva (Russia) Margarita Lazareva	(Italy) Evelyn Mayr (Germany) Anne Schäfer	(Romania) Cristina Dinu (Italy) Gioia Barbieri (Italy) Andreea Văideanu (Italy) Anastasia Grymalska
March 5	Aurangabad, India; Clay $10,000; Singles and doubles draws	(Slovenia) Dalila Jakupovič; 6–4, 7–5	(Thailand) Peangtarn Plipuech	(Turkey) Seda Arantekin (Italy) Stephanie Scimone	(Germany) Sarah-Rebecca Sekulic (Portugal) Bárbara Luz (Italy) Nicole Clerico (Slovenia) Anja Prislan
March 5	Aurangabad, India; Clay $10,000; Singles and doubles draws	(Slovenia) Dalila Jakupovič (Germany) Sarah-Rebecca Sekulic; 6–1, 6–3	(Thailand) Peangtarn Plipuech (Thailand) Varunya Wongteanchai	(Turkey) Seda Arantekin (Italy) Stephanie Scimone	(Germany) Sarah-Rebecca Sekulic (Portugal) Bárbara Luz (Italy) Nicole Clerico (Slovenia) Anja Prislan
March 5	Irapuato, Mexico; Hard $25,000; Singles and doubles draws	(Netherlands) Kiki Bertens; 6–4, 2–6, 6–1	(Kazakhstan) Yaroslava Shvedova	(Hungary) Tímea Babos (Argentina) Mailen Auroux	(Slovakia) Jana Čepelová (Liechtenstein) Stephanie Vogt (Venezuela) Adriana Pérez (Italy) Anna Remondina
March 5	Irapuato, Mexico; Hard $25,000; Singles and doubles draws	(Slovakia) Janette Husárová (Hungary) Katalin Marosi; 6–2, 6–7^{(9–11)}, [10–7]	(Italy) Maria Elena Camerin (Ukraine) Mariya Koryttseva	(Hungary) Tímea Babos (Argentina) Mailen Auroux	(Slovakia) Jana Čepelová (Liechtenstein) Stephanie Vogt (Venezuela) Adriana Pérez (Italy) Anna Remondina
March 12	The Bahamas Women's Open; Nassau, The Bahamas; Hard $100,000+H; Singles – Doubles	(Canada) Aleksandra Wozniak; 6–4, 7–5	(France) Alizé Cornet	(United Kingdom) Anne Keothavong (Serbia) Bojana Jovanovski	(Czech Republic) Kristýna Plíšková (Czech Republic) Karolína Plíšková (United States) Maria Sanchez (United States) Gail Brodsky
March 12	The Bahamas Women's Open; Nassau, The Bahamas; Hard $100,000+H; Singles – Doubles	(Slovakia) Janette Husárová (Hungary) Katalin Marosi; 6–1, 3–6, [10–6]	(Czech Republic) Eva Birnerová (United Kingdom) Anne Keothavong	(United Kingdom) Anne Keothavong (Serbia) Bojana Jovanovski	(Czech Republic) Kristýna Plíšková (Czech Republic) Karolína Plíšková (United States) Maria Sanchez (United States) Gail Brodsky
March 12	Clearwater, United States; Hard $25,000; Singles and doubles draws	(Spain) Garbiñe Muguruza; 6–0, 6–1	(United States) Grace Min	(China) Zhang Shuai (Switzerland) Stefanie Vögele	(Belarus) Anastasiya Yakimova (United Kingdom) Heather Watson (Netherlands) Arantxa Rus (Italy) Camila Giorgi
March 12	Clearwater, United States; Hard $25,000; Singles and doubles draws	(Georgia (country)) Ekaterine Gorgodze (Ukraine) Alyona Sotnikova; 6–3, 6–2	(United Kingdom) Naomi Broady (United Kingdom) Heather Watson	(China) Zhang Shuai (Switzerland) Stefanie Vögele	(Belarus) Anastasiya Yakimova (United Kingdom) Heather Watson (Netherlands) Arantxa Rus (Italy) Camila Giorgi
March 12	Miyazaki, Japan; Grass $10,000; Singles and doubles draws	(Japan) Makoto Ninomiya; 6–0, 6–7^{(5–7)}, 6–0	(Japan) Yumi Miyazaki	(Japan) Chinami Ogi (Japan) Yuka Higuchi	(Japan) Mana Ayukawa (Japan) Eri Hozumi (Japan) Ai Koga (Japan) Chihiro Nunome
March 12	Miyazaki, Japan; Grass $10,000; Singles and doubles draws	(Japan) Akari Inoue (Japan) Hiroko Kuwata; 6–3, 6–0	(Japan) Kanae Hisami (Japan) Yumi Miyazaki	(Japan) Chinami Ogi (Japan) Yuka Higuchi	(Japan) Mana Ayukawa (Japan) Eri Hozumi (Japan) Ai Koga (Japan) Chihiro Nunome
March 12	Mumbai, India; Hard $10,000; Singles and doubles draws	(Serbia) Jovana Jakšić; 6–3, 7–6^{(7–5)}	(Israel) Keren Shlomo	(Thailand) Varunya Wongteanchai (Thailand) Nungnadda Wannasuk	(Thailand) Peangtarn Plipuech (Germany) Sarah-Rebecca Sekulic (Italy) Nicole Clerico (Serbia) Tamara Čurović
March 12	Mumbai, India; Hard $10,000; Singles and doubles draws	(Thailand) Peangtarn Plipuech (Thailand) Varunya Wongteanchai; 6–1, 6–2	(Slovenia) Anja Prislan (India) Kyra Shroff	(Thailand) Varunya Wongteanchai (Thailand) Nungnadda Wannasuk	(Thailand) Peangtarn Plipuech (Germany) Sarah-Rebecca Sekulic (Italy) Nicole Clerico (Serbia) Tamara Čurović
March 12	Astana, Kazakhstan; Hard $10,000; Singles and doubles draws	(Germany) Anna-Lena Friedsam; 6–4, 6–3	(Russia) Ekaterina Yashina	(Russia) Eugeniya Pashkova (Belarus) Aliaksandra Sasnovich	(Belarus) Ilona Kremen (Russia) Polina Monova (Ukraine) Anastasiya Vasylyeva (Poland) Justyna Jegiołka
March 12	Astana, Kazakhstan; Hard $10,000; Singles and doubles draws	(Russia) Eugeniya Pashkova (Ukraine) Anastasiya Vasylyeva; 7–5, 6–2	(Uzbekistan) Albina Khabibulina (Belarus) Ilona Kremen	(Russia) Eugeniya Pashkova (Belarus) Aliaksandra Sasnovich	(Belarus) Ilona Kremen (Russia) Polina Monova (Ukraine) Anastasiya Vasylyeva (Poland) Justyna Jegiołka
March 12	Amiens, France; Clay $10,000; Singles and doubles draws	(Bulgaria) Isabella Shinikova; 6–3, 0–6, 6–3	(Belgium) Ysaline Bonaventure	(Switzerland) Tess Sugnaux (France) Céline Ghesquière	(France) Amandine Hesse (France) Josepha Adam (France) Clothilde de Bernardi (France) Laëtitia Sarrazin
March 12	Amiens, France; Clay $10,000; Singles and doubles draws	(Netherlands) Bernice van de Velde (Netherlands) Nicolette van Uitert; 2–6, 7–6^{(9–7)}, [10–6]	(Germany) Katharina Lehnert (Austria) Katharina Negrin	(Switzerland) Tess Sugnaux (France) Céline Ghesquière	(France) Amandine Hesse (France) Josepha Adam (France) Clothilde de Bernardi (France) Laëtitia Sarrazin
March 12	Madrid, Spain; Clay $10,000; Singles and doubles draws	(France) Estelle Guisard; 6–0, 7–6^{(7–5)}	(Spain) Sara Sorribes Tormo	(Romania) Raluca Olaru (Croatia) Iva Mekovec	(Spain) Elena Cerezo Codina (Croatia) Indire Akiki (Russia) Nanuli Pipiya (Spain) Rocío de la Torre Sánchez
March 12	Madrid, Spain; Clay $10,000; Singles and doubles draws	(Spain) Pilar Domínguez López (Spain) Isabel Rapisarda Calvo; 7–6^{(7–0)}, 2–6, [10–8]	(Czech Republic) Jana Jandová (Bosnia and Herzegovina) Sandra Martinović	(Romania) Raluca Olaru (Croatia) Iva Mekovec	(Spain) Elena Cerezo Codina (Croatia) Indire Akiki (Russia) Nanuli Pipiya (Spain) Rocío de la Torre Sánchez
March 12	Antalya, Turkey; Clay $10,000; Singles and doubles draws	(Croatia) Ana Savić; 6–0, 6–4	(Bosnia and Herzegovina) Jasmina Tinjić	(Italy) Evelyn Mayr (Italy) Gioia Barbieri	(Italy) Martina Di Giuseppe (Italy) Anastasia Grymalska (Sweden) Sandra Roma (Slovenia) Maša Zec Peškirič
March 12	Antalya, Turkey; Clay $10,000; Singles and doubles draws	(Italy) Gioia Barbieri (Italy) Anastasia Grymalska; 6–4, 1–6, [11–9]	(Italy) Claudia Giovine (United States) Sanaz Marand	(Italy) Evelyn Mayr (Italy) Gioia Barbieri	(Italy) Martina Di Giuseppe (Italy) Anastasia Grymalska (Sweden) Sandra Roma (Slovenia) Maša Zec Peškirič
March 12	Bath, United Kingdom; Hard $10,000; Singles and doubles draws	(Czech Republic) Tereza Smitková; 4–6, 6–2, 6–1	(Poland) Katarzyna Piter	(United Kingdom) Lucy Brown (United Kingdom) Samantha Murray	(Slovakia) Lenka Juríková (Italy) Giulia Gatto-Monticone (United States) Caitlin Whoriskey (Spain) María Teresa Torró Flor
March 12	Bath, United Kingdom; Hard $10,000; Singles and doubles draws	(United Kingdom) Samantha Murray (United Kingdom) Emily Webley-Smith; 4–6, 6–4, [10–5]	(Slovakia) Lenka Juríková (Poland) Katarzyna Piter	(United Kingdom) Lucy Brown (United Kingdom) Samantha Murray	(Slovakia) Lenka Juríková (Italy) Giulia Gatto-Monticone (United States) Caitlin Whoriskey (Spain) María Teresa Torró Flor
March 12	Poza Rica, Mexico; Hard $25,000; Singles and doubles draws	(Kazakhstan) Yaroslava Shvedova; 6–1, 6–2	(Puerto Rico) Monica Puig	(Austria) Patricia Mayr-Achleitner (Slovakia) Jana Čepelová	(Slovakia) Zuzana Zlochová (Italy) Maria Elena Camerin (Netherlands) Kiki Bertens (Serbia) Aleksandra Krunić
March 12	Poza Rica, Mexico; Hard $25,000; Singles and doubles draws	(Slovakia) Jana Čepelová (Slovakia) Lenka Wienerová; 7–5, 2–6, [10–3]	(Italy) Maria Elena Camerin (Ukraine) Mariya Koryttseva	(Austria) Patricia Mayr-Achleitner (Slovakia) Jana Čepelová	(Slovakia) Zuzana Zlochová (Italy) Maria Elena Camerin (Netherlands) Kiki Bertens (Serbia) Aleksandra Krunić
March 12	Sanya, China; Hard $25,000; Singles and doubles draws	(China) Wang Qiang; 6–2, 6–4	(China) Han Xinyun	(China) Zhou Yimiao (China) Wang Yafan	(Japan) Erika Sema (Japan) Sachie Ishizu (China) Zheng Saisai (China) Liu Chang
March 12	Sanya, China; Hard $25,000; Singles and doubles draws	(Japan) Erika Sema (China) Zheng Saisai; 6–2, 6–2	(China) Liang Chen (China) Zhou Yimiao	(China) Zhou Yimiao (China) Wang Yafan	(Japan) Erika Sema (Japan) Sachie Ishizu (China) Zheng Saisai (China) Liu Chang
March 19	Almaty, Kazakhstan; Hard $25,000; Singles and doubles draws	(Ukraine) Anastasiya Vasylyeva; 6–4, 6–1	(Slovakia) Michaela Hončová	(Russia) Yulia Putintseva (Turkey) Çağla Büyükakçay	(Poland) Justyna Jegiołka (Turkey) Pemra Özgen (Russia) Daria Mironova (Belarus) Ilona Kremen
March 19	Almaty, Kazakhstan; Hard $25,000; Singles and doubles draws	(Georgia (country)) Oksana Kalashnikova (Russia) Eugeniya Pashkova; 6–1, 7–5	(Uzbekistan) Albina Khabibulina (Belarus) Ilona Kremen	(Russia) Yulia Putintseva (Turkey) Çağla Büyükakçay	(Poland) Justyna Jegiołka (Turkey) Pemra Özgen (Russia) Daria Mironova (Belarus) Ilona Kremen
March 19	Bangalore, India; Hard $25,000; Singles and doubles draws	(Croatia) Donna Vekić; 6–2, 6–4	(Chile) Andrea Koch Benvenuto	(India) Kyra Shroff (Japan) Akiko Omae	(Belgium) Tamaryn Hendler (Thailand) Nungnadda Wannasuk (Austria) Melanie Klaffner (Turkey) Melis Sezer
March 19	Bangalore, India; Hard $25,000; Singles and doubles draws	(Belgium) Tamaryn Hendler (Austria) Melanie Klaffner; 6–2, 4–6, [10–6]	(Slovenia) Tadeja Majerič (Slovenia) Anja Prislan	(India) Kyra Shroff (Japan) Akiko Omae	(Belgium) Tamaryn Hendler (Thailand) Nungnadda Wannasuk (Austria) Melanie Klaffner (Turkey) Melis Sezer
March 19	Moscow, Russia; Carpet $25,000; Singles and doubles draws	(Russia) Margarita Gasparyan; 6–0, retired	(Ukraine) Lyudmyla Kichenok	(Russia) Anastasia Frolova (Russia) Ekaterina Bychkova	(Belarus) Polina Pekhova (Ukraine) Valentyna Ivakhnenko (Russia) Daria Gavrilova (Ukraine) Kateryna Kozlova
March 19	Moscow, Russia; Carpet $25,000; Singles and doubles draws	(Russia) Margarita Gasparyan (Russia) Anna Arina Marenko; 3–6, 7–6^{(7–4)}, [10–6]	(Ukraine) Valentyna Ivakhnenko (Ukraine) Kateryna Kozlova	(Russia) Anastasia Frolova (Russia) Ekaterina Bychkova	(Belarus) Polina Pekhova (Ukraine) Valentyna Ivakhnenko (Russia) Daria Gavrilova (Ukraine) Kateryna Kozlova
March 19	Aegon GB Pro–Series Bath; Bath, United Kingdom; Hard $25,000; Singles and doubles draws	(Netherlands) Kiki Bertens; 6–4, 3–6, 6–3	(Germany) Annika Beck	(Latvia) Diāna Marcinkēviča (Germany) Tatjana Malek	(Estonia) Anett Kontaveit (Israel) Julia Glushko (Croatia) Ana Vrljić (Australia) Johanna Konta
March 19	Aegon GB Pro–Series Bath; Bath, United Kingdom; Hard $25,000; Singles and doubles draws	(Germany) Tatjana Malek (Liechtenstein) Stephanie Vogt; 6–3, 3–6, [10–3]	(France) Julie Coin (United Kingdom) Melanie South	(Latvia) Diāna Marcinkēviča (Germany) Tatjana Malek	(Estonia) Anett Kontaveit (Israel) Julia Glushko (Croatia) Ana Vrljić (Australia) Johanna Konta
March 19	Phuket, Thailand; Hard $25,000; Singles and doubles draws	(Germany) Dinah Pfizenmaier; 6–2, 6–4	(Thailand) Noppawan Lertcheewakarn	(Hungary) Réka-Luca Jani (Ukraine) Yuliya Beygelzimer	(Japan) Erika Sema (Austria) Nikola Hofmanova (Belgium) Kirsten Flipkens (China) Zheng Saisai
March 19	Phuket, Thailand; Hard $25,000; Singles and doubles draws	(Russia) Natela Dzalamidze (Russia) Marta Sirotkina; 6–4, 6–1	(Chinese Taipei) Chan Chin-wei (China) Zheng Saisai	(Hungary) Réka-Luca Jani (Ukraine) Yuliya Beygelzimer	(Japan) Erika Sema (Austria) Nikola Hofmanova (Belgium) Kirsten Flipkens (China) Zheng Saisai
March 19	Kōfu, Japan; Hard $10,000; Singles and doubles draws	(Japan) Hiroko Kuwata; 6–4, 4–6, 7–6^{(9–7)}	(China) Liu Fangzhou	(Japan) Eri Hozumi (Japan) Akiko Yonemura	(Japan) Kanae Hisami (Japan) Akari Inoue (Japan) Ayumi Oka (Japan) Miki Miyamura
March 19	Kōfu, Japan; Hard $10,000; Singles and doubles draws	(Japan) Ayumi Oka (Japan) Kotomi Takahata; 6–4, 5–7, [10–3]	(Japan) Eri Hozumi (Japan) Remi Tezuka	(Japan) Eri Hozumi (Japan) Akiko Yonemura	(Japan) Kanae Hisami (Japan) Akari Inoue (Japan) Ayumi Oka (Japan) Miki Miyamura
March 19	Antalya, Turkey; Clay $10,000; Singles and doubles draws	(Croatia) Ana Savić; 5–0, retired	(Switzerland) Lisa Sabino	(Italy) Evelyn Mayr (Serbia) Teodora Mirčić	(Germany) Sabrina Baumgarten (Italy) Andreea Văideanu (Italy) Claudia Giovine (Italy) Julia Mayr
March 19	Antalya, Turkey; Clay $10,000; Singles and doubles draws	(Italy) Evelyn Mayr (Italy) Julia Mayr; 6–2, 6–3	(Italy) Claudia Giovine (Serbia) Teodora Mirčić	(Italy) Evelyn Mayr (Serbia) Teodora Mirčić	(Germany) Sabrina Baumgarten (Italy) Andreea Văideanu (Italy) Claudia Giovine (Italy) Julia Mayr
March 19	Gonesse, France; Clay $10,000; Singles and doubles draws	(France) Iryna Brémond; 7–6^{(7–2)}, 6–3	(France) Audrey Bergot	(France) Sherazad Benamar (Réunion) Pauline Payet	(France) Estelle Cascino (France) Amandine Hesse (Germany) Dejana Raickovic (France) Marine Partaud
March 19	Gonesse, France; Clay $10,000; Singles and doubles draws	(Slovakia) Karin Morgošová (Slovakia) Lenka Tvarošková; 7–6^{(7–4)}, 6–1	(France) Sherazad Benamar (France) Brandy Mina	(France) Sherazad Benamar (Réunion) Pauline Payet	(France) Estelle Cascino (France) Amandine Hesse (Germany) Dejana Raickovic (France) Marine Partaud
March 19	Metepec, Mexico; Hard $10,000; Singles and doubles draws	(Slovakia) Zuzana Zlochová; 6–3, 7–5	(Argentina) Vanesa Furlanetto	(United States) Elizabeth Lumpkin (Mexico) Nadia Abdalá	(Chile) Cecilia Costa Melgar (Argentina) Aranza Salut (Slovakia) Lenka Broošová (United States) Nicole Melichar
March 19	Metepec, Mexico; Hard $10,000; Singles and doubles draws	(United States) Elizabeth Ferris (United States) Nicole Melichar; 6–3, 6–1	(Brazil) Liz Tatiane Koehler Bogarin (United States) Brianna Morgan	(United States) Elizabeth Lumpkin (Mexico) Nadia Abdalá	(Chile) Cecilia Costa Melgar (Argentina) Aranza Salut (Slovakia) Lenka Broošová (United States) Nicole Melichar
March 19	Madrid, Spain; Clay $10,000; Singles and doubles draws	(Spain) Sara Sorribes Tormo; 6–2, 7–6^{(10–8)}	(Spain) Isabel Rapisarda Calvo	(France) Estelle Guisard (Croatia) Indire Akiki	(Hungary) Csilla Argyelán (Russia) Nanuli Pipiya (Italy) Gaia Sanesi (Italy) Giulia Sussarello
March 19	Madrid, Spain; Clay $10,000; Singles and doubles draws	(Czech Republic) Jana Jandová (Bosnia and Herzegovina) Sandra Martinović; 6–3, 6–3	(Switzerland) Clelia Melena (Italy) Giulia Sussarello	(France) Estelle Guisard (Croatia) Indire Akiki	(Hungary) Csilla Argyelán (Russia) Nanuli Pipiya (Italy) Gaia Sanesi (Italy) Giulia Sussarello
March 19	La Marsa, Tunisia; Clay $25,000; Singles and doubles draws	(Ukraine) Elina Svitolina; 7–6^{(7–4)}, 7–6^{(7–5)}	(Bulgaria) Isabella Shinikova	(Tunisia) Ons Jabeur (Romania) Andreea Mitu	(Bosnia and Herzegovina) Mervana Jugić-Salkić (Slovenia) Maša Zec Peškirič (Romania) Raluca Olaru (Switzerland) Conny Perrin
March 19	La Marsa, Tunisia; Clay $25,000; Singles and doubles draws	(Norway) Ulrikke Eikeri (Bulgaria) Isabella Shinikova; 6–3, 6–4	(Bosnia and Herzegovina) Mervana Jugić-Salkić (Austria) Sandra Klemenschits	(Tunisia) Ons Jabeur (Romania) Andreea Mitu	(Bosnia and Herzegovina) Mervana Jugić-Salkić (Slovenia) Maša Zec Peškirič (Romania) Raluca Olaru (Switzerland) Conny Perrin
March 19	Rancagua, Chile; Clay $10,000; Singles and doubles draws	(Chile) Daniela Seguel; 7–6^{(7–4)}, 6–3	(Argentina) Carolina Zeballos	(Peru) Patricia Kú Flores (Chile) Fernanda Brito	(Argentina) Agustina Lepore (Germany) Karolina Nowak (Brazil) Carla Forte (Paraguay) Isabella Robbiani
March 19	Rancagua, Chile; Clay $10,000; Singles and doubles draws	(Peru) Patricia Kú Flores (Chile) Daniela Seguel; 7–6^{(7–2)}, 7–5	(Chile) Fernanda Brito (Brazil) Raquel Piltcher	(Peru) Patricia Kú Flores (Chile) Fernanda Brito	(Argentina) Agustina Lepore (Germany) Karolina Nowak (Brazil) Carla Forte (Paraguay) Isabella Robbiani
March 19	Ipswich, Australia; Clay $25,000; Singles and doubles draws	(Poland) Sandra Zaniewska; 7–6^{(7–5)}, 6–1	(Australia) Ashleigh Barty	(Austria) Tina Schiechtl (Australia) Sally Peers	(Japan) Yurika Sema (Japan) Risa Ozaki (Japan) Junri Namigata (Australia) Karolina Wlodarczak
March 19	Ipswich, Australia; Clay $25,000; Singles and doubles draws	(Australia) Monique Adamczak (Poland) Sandra Zaniewska; 7–5, 6–4	(Japan) Shuko Aoyama (Japan) Junri Namigata	(Austria) Tina Schiechtl (Australia) Sally Peers	(Japan) Yurika Sema (Japan) Risa Ozaki (Japan) Junri Namigata (Australia) Karolina Wlodarczak
March 26	The Oaks Club Challenger; Osprey, United States; Clay $50,000; Singles – Doubles	(Netherlands) Arantxa Rus; 6–4, 6–1	(Kazakhstan) Sesil Karatantcheva	(Romania) Edina Gallovits-Hall (Russia) Alexandra Panova	(Czech Republic) Lucie Hradecká (Argentina) Florencia Molinero (Spain) Lara Arruabarrena Vecino (France) Alizé Cornet
March 26	The Oaks Club Challenger; Osprey, United States; Clay $50,000; Singles – Doubles	(United States) Lindsay Lee-Waters (United States) Megan Moulton-Levy; 2–6, 6–4, [10–7]	(Russia) Alexandra Panova (Ukraine) Lesia Tsurenko	(Romania) Edina Gallovits-Hall (Russia) Alexandra Panova	(Czech Republic) Lucie Hradecká (Argentina) Florencia Molinero (Spain) Lara Arruabarrena Vecino (France) Alizé Cornet
March 26	Phuket, Thailand; Hard $25,000; Singles and doubles draws	(Russia) Marta Sirotkina; 7–5, 7–6^{(8–6)}	(France) Claire Feuerstein	(Turkey) Çağla Büyükakçay (China) Zheng Saisai	(Japan) Erika Sema (Japan) Rika Fujiwara (Thailand) Nudnida Luangnam (Belgium) Kirsten Flipkens
March 26	Phuket, Thailand; Hard $25,000; Singles and doubles draws	(Thailand) Noppawan Lertcheewakarn (China) Zheng Saisai; 6–3, 6–3	(China) Han Xinyun (China) Sun Shengnan	(Turkey) Çağla Büyükakçay (China) Zheng Saisai	(Japan) Erika Sema (Japan) Rika Fujiwara (Thailand) Nudnida Luangnam (Belgium) Kirsten Flipkens
March 26	Nishi-Tama, Japan; Hard $10,000; Singles and doubles draws	(Japan) Akiko Yonemura; 1–1, retired	(Japan) Kumiko Iijima	(Japan) Aki Yamasoto (China) Wang Boyan	(Japan) Hiroko Kuwata (Japan) Makiho Kozawa (Japan) Kanae Iha (Japan) Miyabi Inoue
March 26	Nishi-Tama, Japan; Hard $10,000; Singles and doubles draws	(Japan) Eri Hozumi (Japan) Remi Tezuka; 6–4, 6–7^{(1–7)}, [10–7]	(Japan) Kazusa Ito (Japan) Yuka Mori	(Japan) Aki Yamasoto (China) Wang Boyan	(Japan) Hiroko Kuwata (Japan) Makiho Kozawa (Japan) Kanae Iha (Japan) Miyabi Inoue
March 26	Antalya, Turkey; Hard $10,000; Singles and doubles draws	(Slovakia) Anna Karolína Schmiedlová; 7–6^{(7–5)}, 6–4	(Germany) Anna-Lena Friedsam	(Czech Republic) Tereza Malíková (Slovakia) Chantal Škamlová	(Ukraine) Vladyslava Zanosiyenko (United States) Anamika Bhargava (Turkey) Sultan Gönen (Austria) Janina Toljan
March 26	Antalya, Turkey; Hard $10,000; Singles and doubles draws	(United States) Anamika Bhargava (United States) Sylvia Krywacz; 4–6, 6–4, [10–3]	(Slovakia) Anna Karolína Schmiedlová (Slovakia) Chantal Škamlová	(Czech Republic) Tereza Malíková (Slovakia) Chantal Škamlová	(Ukraine) Vladyslava Zanosiyenko (United States) Anamika Bhargava (Turkey) Sultan Gönen (Austria) Janina Toljan
March 26	Le Havre, France; Clay $10,000; Singles and doubles draws	(France) Myrtille Georges; 5–7, 7–5, 6–0	(Belgium) Ysaline Bonaventure	(Norway) Ulrikke Eikeri (Poland) Patrycja Sanduska	(France) Chloé Paquet (Germany) Dejana Raickovic (Hungary) Vanda Lukács (Netherlands) Bernice van de Velde
March 26	Le Havre, France; Clay $10,000; Singles and doubles draws	(France) Myrtille Georges (France) Céline Ghesquière; 6–4, 6–2	(France) Manon Arcangioli (France) Kinnie Laisné	(Norway) Ulrikke Eikeri (Poland) Patrycja Sanduska	(France) Chloé Paquet (Germany) Dejana Raickovic (Hungary) Vanda Lukács (Netherlands) Bernice van de Velde
March 26	Fällanden, Switzerland; Carpet $10,000; Singles and doubles draws	(Switzerland) Amra Sadiković; 6–3, 6–2	(Germany) Sarah-Rebecca Sekulic	(Switzerland) Karin Kennel (Germany) Laura Schaeder	(Czech Republic) Eva Hrdinová (Germany) Nina Zander (Italy) Sara Sussarello (United Kingdom) Emily Webley-Smith
March 26	Fällanden, Switzerland; Carpet $10,000; Singles and doubles draws	(Switzerland) Xenia Knoll (Switzerland) Amra Sadiković; 6–7^{(3–7)}, 6–4, [12–10]	(Switzerland) Lara Michel (United Kingdom) Emily Webley-Smith	(Switzerland) Karin Kennel (Germany) Laura Schaeder	(Czech Republic) Eva Hrdinová (Germany) Nina Zander (Italy) Sara Sussarello (United Kingdom) Emily Webley-Smith
March 26	Ribeirão Preto, Brazil; Clay $10,000; Singles and doubles draws	(Brazil) Gabriela Cé; 6–1, 6–0	(South Africa) Natasha Fourouclas	(Chile) Fernanda Brito (Argentina) Carolina Zeballos	(Brazil) Nathalia Rossi (Brazil) Nathaly Kurata (Paraguay) Isabella Robbiani (Germany) Karolina Nowak
March 26	Ribeirão Preto, Brazil; Clay $10,000; Singles and doubles draws	(Brazil) Gabriela Cé (Brazil) Carla Forte; 6–1, 3–6, [10–7]	(Paraguay) Isabella Robbiani (Argentina) Carolina Zeballos	(Chile) Fernanda Brito (Argentina) Carolina Zeballos	(Brazil) Nathalia Rossi (Brazil) Nathaly Kurata (Paraguay) Isabella Robbiani (Germany) Karolina Nowak
March 26	Bundaberg, Australia; Hard $25,000; Singles and doubles draws	(Poland) Sandra Zaniewska; 6–3, 6–2	(Japan) Shuko Aoyama	(United States) Jennifer Elie (Japan) Junri Namigata	(Japan) Yurika Sema (Japan) Akiko Omae (Australia) Sacha Jones (Australia) Isabella Holland
March 26	Bundaberg, Australia; Hard $25,000; Singles and doubles draws	(Japan) Shuko Aoyama (Japan) Junri Namigata; 6–1, 7–5	(Australia) Sacha Jones (Australia) Sally Peers	(United States) Jennifer Elie (Japan) Junri Namigata	(Japan) Yurika Sema (Japan) Akiko Omae (Australia) Sacha Jones (Australia) Isabella Holland
March 26	Puebla, Mexico; Hard $10,000; Singles and doubles draws	(Argentina) Vanesa Furlanetto; 6–3, 6–3	(United States) Elizabeth Ferris	(United States) Nicole Melichar (Chile) Cecilia Costa Melgar	(Mexico) Ana Sofía Sánchez (Argentina) Aranza Salut (Czech Republic) Kateřina Kramperová (Slovakia) Zuzana Zlochová
March 26	Puebla, Mexico; Hard $10,000; Singles and doubles draws	(Mexico) Ana Paula de la Peña (Mexico) Ivette López; 6–1, 7–6^{(7–0)}	(Chile) Cecilia Costa Melgar (Brazil) Flávia Guimarães Bueno	(United States) Nicole Melichar (Chile) Cecilia Costa Melgar	(Mexico) Ana Sofía Sánchez (Argentina) Aranza Salut (Czech Republic) Kateřina Kramperová (Slovakia) Zuzana Zlochová

== See also ==
- 2012 WTA Tour
- 2012 WTA Challenger Tour
- 2012 ATP World Tour
- 2012 ATP Challenger Tour
- 2012 ITF Women's Circuit
- 2012 ITF Men's Circuit
- Women's Tennis Association
- International Tennis Federation
