= 2012 Dow Corning Tennis Classic – Doubles =

Doubles
- 2012 Dow Corning Tennis Classic

Final
- Champions: (Czech Republic) Andrea Hlaváčková (Czech Republic) Lucie Hradecká
- Runners-up: (Russia) Vesna Dolonts (France) Stéphanie Foretz Gacon
- Score: 7–6^{(7–4)}, 6–2

Events
Singles	Doubles
← 2011 ·	Dow Corning Tennis Classic	· 2013 →

Jamie Hampton and Anna Tatishvili were the defending champions, both decided to participate, but with different partners.

Hampton paired up with Melanie Oudin, whilst Tatishvili played with Alexa Glatch, and both faced each other in the quarterfinals, Hampton and Oudin were the winners but then ended up losing to Andrea Hlaváčková and Lucie Hradecká in the semifinals.

Hlaváčková and Hradecká went on to win the title, defeating Vesna Dolonts and Stéphanie Foretz Gacon in the final, 7–6^{(7–4)}, 6–2.

== Seeds ==
1. (Czech Republic) Andrea Hlaváčková / (Czech Republic) Lucie Hradecká (champions)
2. (Belarus) Olga Govortsova / (Russia) Evgeniya Rodina (first round)
3. (United States) Ahsha Rolle / (China) Zhang Shuai (first round)
4. (United States) Alexa Glatch / (Georgia (country)) Anna Tatishvili (quarterfinals)

== Draw ==
=== Key ===
- Q = Qualifier
- WC = Wild card
- LL = Lucky loser
- Alt = Alternate
- SE = Special exempt
- PR = Protected ranking
- ITF = ITF entry
- JE = Junior exempt
- w/o = Walkover
- r = Retired
- d = Defaulted
- SR = Special ranking

First round
1	(Czech Republic) A Hlaváčková (Czech Republic) L Hradecká	6	6
(United States) W Jones (United Kingdom) S Murray	4	1
(United States) G Brodsky (United States) L Litvak	1	6	[10]
(France) V Larrière (Croatia) M Lučić	6	2	[6]
4	(United States) A Glatch (Georgia (country)) A Tatishvili	7	6
WC	(United States) M Brengle (United States) S Rogers	5	3
(United States) J Hampton (United States) M Oudin	6	6
(Belarus) D Kustova (United States) C Scholl	3	2
WC	(United States) S Kalhorn (United States) A Parra	3	1
(Russia) V Dolonts (France) S Foretz Gacon	6	6
(United States) I Falconi (United States) A Riske	6	6
3	(United States) A Rolle (China) S Zhang	4	2
(United States) A Mueller (United States) Y Schnack	4	0
(Canada) G Dabrowski (United States) J Pegula	6	6
(United States) L Lee-Waters (United States) M Moulton-Levy	4	6	[10]
2	(Belarus) O Govortsova (Russia) E Rodina	6	4	[8]

Quarterfinals
1	(Czech Republic) A Hlaváčková (Czech Republic) L Hradecká	6	6
(United States) G Brodsky (United States) L Litvak	3	0
4	(United States) A Glatch (Georgia (country)) A Tatishvili	6	6^{4}	[8]
(United States) J Hampton (United States) M Oudin	3	7^{7}	[10]
(Russia) V Dolonts (France) S Foretz Gacon	7	6
(United States) I Falconi (United States) A Riske	5	2
(Canada) G Dabrowski (United States) J Pegula	2	0
(United States) L Lee-Waters (United States) M Moulton-Levy	6	6

Semifinals
1	(Czech Republic) A Hlaváčková (Czech Republic) L Hradecká	6	6
(United States) J Hampton (United States) M Oudin	4	3
(Russia) V Dolonts (France) S Foretz Gacon	0	6	[10]
(United States) L Lee-Waters (United States) M Moulton-Levy	6	4	[4]

Finals
1	(Czech Republic) A Hlaváčková (Czech Republic) L Hradecká	7^{7}	6
(Russia) V Dolonts (France) S Foretz Gacon	6^{4}	2
