= 2011 Dow Corning Tennis Classic =

- Date: 2011
- Edition: 2nd

Champions

Singles
- (Czech Republic) Lucie Hradecká

Doubles
- (United States) Jamie Hampton / (Georgia (country)) Anna Tatishvili
← 2010 ·	Dow Corning Tennis Classic	· 2012 →

The 2011 Dow Corning Tennis Classic was an ITF tennis tournament held 7–13 February 2011 in Midland, Michigan, United States for women's professional tennis, with US$100,000 in prize money. It was organized by the International Tennis Federation under the tier of Women's Tennis Association.

== WTA entrants ==
=== Seeds ===
Country	Player	Rank^{1}	Seed
USA	Varvara Lepchenko	75	1
CAN	Rebecca Marino	84	2
RUS	Evgeniya Rodina	90	3
GBR	Anne Keothavong	91	4
ROU	Sorana Cîrstea	93	5
SVK	Magdaléna Rybáriková	101	6
RUS	Ksenia Pervak	102	7
USA	Coco Vandeweghe	103	8

- Rankings are as of February 7, 2011.

=== Other entrants ===
The following players received wildcards into the singles main draw:

- (United States) Brittany Augustine
- (United States) Victoria Duval
- (United States) Jessica Pegula
- (United States) Shelby Rogers

The following players received entry from the qualifying draw:

- (United States) Alexa Glatch
- (United States) Ahsha Rolle
- (United States) Alexandra Stevenson
- (United States) Mashona Washington

== Champions ==
=== Singles ===
(Czech Republic) Lucie Hradecká def. (United States) Irina Falconi, 6–4, 6–4

=== Doubles ===
(United States) Jamie Hampton / (Georgia (country)) Anna Tatishvili def. (United States) Irina Falconi / (United States) Alison Riske, walkover
