= 2011 Dow Corning Tennis Classic – Singles =

Singles
- 2011 Dow Corning Tennis Classic

Final
- Champion: (Czech Republic) Lucie Hradecká
- Runner-up: (United States) Irina Falconi
- Score: 6–4, 6–4

Events
Singles	Doubles
← 2010 ·	Dow Corning Tennis Classic	· 2012 →

The defending champion was Elena Baltacha, but she did not compete this year.

Lucie Hradecká defeated Irina Falconi, 6–4, 6–4.

== Seeds ==
1. (United States) Varvara Lepchenko (first round)
2. (Canada) Rebecca Marino (semifinals)
3. (Russia) Evgeniya Rodina (first round)
4. (United Kingdom) Anne Keothavong (second round)
5. (Romania) Sorana Cîrstea (second round)
6. (Slovakia) Magdaléna Rybáriková (second round)
7. (Russia) Ksenia Pervak (semifinals)
8. (United States) Coco Vandeweghe (first round)

== Draw ==
=== Key ===
- Q = Qualifier
- WC = Wild card
- LL = Lucky loser
- Alt = Alternate
- SE = Special exempt
- PR = Protected ranking
- ITF = ITF entry
- JE = Junior exempt
- w/o = Walkover
- r = Retired
- d = Defaulted
- SR = Special ranking

=== Finals ===
Semifinals
(Czech Republic) Lucie Hradecká	6	6
7	(Russia) Ksenia Pervak	4	4
(United States) Irina Falconi	6	6
2	(Canada) Rebecca Marino	3	2

Final
(Czech Republic) Lucie Hradecká	6	6
(United States) Irina Falconi	4	4

=== Top half ===
First round
1	(United States) V Lepchenko	7	3	4
(Georgia (country)) A Tatishvili	6^{4}	6	6
(Czech Republic) L Hradecká	7	6
(United States) J Hampton	5	4
WC	(United States) S Rogers	1	3
(Germany) S Lisicki	6	6
(Canada) A Wozniak	4	1
6	(Slovakia) M Rybáriková	6	6
3	(Russia) E Rodina	1	1
Q	(United States) A Rolle	6	6
(Portugal) M Larcher de Brito	6	3	6
(France) J Coin	2	6	4
(United States) C McHale	6	2	3
(Russia) A Pivovarova	3	6	6
(United States) A Riske	3	3
7	(Russia) K Pervak	6	6

Second round
(Georgia (country)) A Tatishvili	3	5
(Czech Republic) L Hradecká	6	7
(Germany) S Lisicki	6	6
6	(Slovakia) M Rybáriková	4	4
Q	(United States) A Rolle	6	3	6
(Portugal) M Larcher de Brito	0	6	3
(Russia) A Pivovarova	2	1
7	(Russia) K Pervak	6	6

Quarterfinals
(Czech Republic) L Hradecká	6	2	7
(Germany) S Lisicki	1	6	6^{3}
Q	(United States) A Rolle	6^{4}	4
7	(Russia) K Pervak	6	2

Semifinals
(Czech Republic) L Hradecká	6	6
7	(Russia) K Pervak	4	4

=== Bottom half ===
First round
5	(Romania) S Cîrstea	7	6
WC	(United States) J Pegula	6^{3}	3
(United States) M Brengle	3	6	7
(Ukraine) O Savchuk	6	3	5
(United States) I Falconi	7	6
(United Kingdom) K O'Brien	5	2
WC	(United States) B Augustine	0	2
4	(United Kingdom) A Keothavong	6	6
8	(United States) C Vandeweghe	3	2
Q	(United States) A Stevenson	6	6
(France) S Foretz Gacon	5	6	7
(United Kingdom) H Watson	7	3	6^{6}
Q	(United States) M Washington	3	3
WC	(United States) V Duval	6	6
Q	(United States) A Glatch	1	6	6^{5}
2	(Canada) R Marino	6	1	7

Second round
5	(Romania) S Cîrstea	2	7	5
(United States) M Brengle	6	5	7
(United States) I Falconi	2	7	6
4	(United Kingdom) A Keothavong	6	5	1
Q	(United States) A Stevenson	6	6^{4}	6
(France) S Foretz Gacon	0	7	3
WC	(United States) V Duval	6^{1}	4
2	(Canada) R Marino	7	6

Quarterfinals
(United States) M Brengle	2	3
(United States) I Falconi	6	6
Q	(United States) A Stevenson	6	3	3
2	(Canada) R Marino	2	6	6

Semifinals
(United States) I Falconi	6	6
2	(Canada) R Marino	3	2
