= 2011 Dow Corning Tennis Classic – Doubles =

Doubles
- 2011 Dow Corning Tennis Classic

Final
- Champion: (United States) Jamie Hampton (Georgia (country)) Anna Tatishvili
- Runner-up: (United States) Irina Falconi (United States) Alison Riske
- Score: Walkover

Events
Singles	Doubles
- Dow Corning Tennis Classic

Laura Granville and Lucie Hradecká were the defending champions, however Granville did not participate. Lucie Hradecká partnered up with Marina Erakovic and lost in the first round to Beatrice Capra and Coco Vandeweghe

The doubles final was scratched and Jamie Hampton and Anna Tatishvili were awarded a “walkover” defeat of Irina Falconi and Alison Riske as Riske withdrew due to illness. As a result, Hampton and Tatishvili split the $5,573 first place prize, while Falconi and Riske forfeited their prize to the United States Tennis Association. Riske was awarded the tournament's Sportsmanship Award with her withdrawal cited as one of the reasons for the award.

== Seeds ==
1. (New Zealand) Marina Erakovic / (Czech Republic) Lucie Hradecká (first round)
2. (United Kingdom) Sarah Borwell / (United States) Courtney Nagle (quarterfinals)
3. (Russia) Ksenia Pervak / (Turkey) İpek Şenoğlu (quarterfinals)
4. (Romania) Sorana Cîrstea / (Russia) Anastasia Pivovarova (quarterfinals)

== Draw ==
Key

- Q = Qualifier
- WC = Wild card
- LL = Lucky loser
- Alt = Alternate
- ITF = ITF entry
- PR = Protected ranking
- SR = Special ranking
- SE = Special exempt
- JE = Junior exempt
- JR = Junior Accelerator Programme entrant
- CO = College Accelerator Programme entrant
- NG = Next Gen Accelerator Program entrant
- w/o = Walkover
- r = Retired
- d = Defaulted

== Finals ==
First round
1	(New Zealand) M Erakovic (Czech Republic) L Hradecká	6	4	[6]
(United States) B Capra (United States) C Vandeweghe	0	6	[10]
WC	(United States) KE Close (Dominican Republic) D Patton	0	2
(Canada) G Dabrowski (United States) W Jones	6	6
4	(Romania) S Cîrstea (Russia) A Pivovarova	6	6
(United States) A Fink (United States) L Litvak	4	1
(United States) B Augustine (United States) A Mueller	1	6	[3]
(United States) I Falconi (United States) A Riske	6	3	[10]
(United States) J Hampton (Georgia (country)) A Tatishvili	6	7
(Canada) R Marino (Canada) M-È Pelletier	3	5
(United States) C Fusano (United States) S Marand	6	4	[7]
3	(Russia) K Pervak (Turkey) İ Şenoğlu	4	6	[10]
(Latvia) L Dekmeijere (Russia) E Rodina	4	1
(United States) A Rolle (United States) M Washington	6	6
(United States) E Lumpkin (United States) S Tweedie-Yates	5	4
2	(United Kingdom) S Borwell (United States) C Nagle	7	6

Quarterfinals
(United States) B Capra (United States) C Vandeweghe	2	4
(Canada) G Dabrowski (United States) W Jones	6	6
4	(Romania) S Cîrstea (Russia) A Pivovarova	3	4
(United States) I Falconi (United States) A Riske	6	6
(United States) J Hampton (Georgia (country)) A Tatishvili	6	6
3	(Russia) K Pervak (Turkey) İ Şenoğlu	0	2
(United States) A Rolle (United States) M Washington	6	6
2	(United Kingdom) S Borwell (United States) C Nagle	3	4

Semifinals
(Canada) G Dabrowski (United States) W Jones	5	5
(United States) I Falconi (United States) A Riske	7	7
(United States) J Hampton (Georgia (country)) A Tatishvili	3	7	[10]
(United States) A Rolle (United States) M Washington	6	6^{3}	[6]

Final
(United States) I Falconi (United States) A Riske
(United States) J Hampton (Georgia (country)) A Tatishvili	w/o
