= 2012 Dow Corning Tennis Classic – Singles =

Singles
- 2012 Dow Corning Tennis Classic

Final
- Champion: (Belarus) Olga Govortsova
- Runner-up: (Slovakia) Magdaléna Rybáriková
- Score: 6–3, 6–7^{(6–8)}, 7–6^{(7–5)}

Events
Singles	Doubles
← 2011 ·	Dow Corning Tennis Classic	· 2013 →

Lucie Hradecká was the defending champion, but lost in the quarterfinals to Jamie Hampton.

Olga Govortsova won the title, defeating Magdaléna Rybáriková in the final, 6–3, 6–7^{(6–8)}, 7–6^{(7–5)}.

== Seeds ==
1. (Czech Republic) Lucie Hradecká (quarterfinals)
2. (Slovakia) Magdaléna Rybáriková (final)
3. (Georgia (country)) Anna Tatishvili (quarterfinals)
4. (United States) Irina Falconi (first round)
5. (Canada) Stéphanie Dubois (second round)
6. (France) Stéphanie Foretz Gacon (second round)
7. (Belarus) Olga Govortsova (champion)
8. (United States) Jamie Hampton (semifinals)

== Draw ==
=== Key ===
- Q = Qualifier
- WC = Wild card
- LL = Lucky loser
- Alt = Alternate
- SE = Special exempt
- PR = Protected ranking
- ITF = ITF entry
- JE = Junior exempt
- w/o = Walkover
- r = Retired
- d = Defaulted
- SR = Special ranking

=== Finals ===
Semifinals
8	(United States) Jamie Hampton	2	4
7	(Belarus) Olga Govortsova	6	6
(Russia) Evgeniya Rodina	1	7^{8}	6^{2}
2	(Slovakia) Magdaléna Rybáriková	6	6^{6}	7^{7}

Final
7	(Belarus) Olga Govortsova	6	6^{6}	7^{7}
2	(Slovakia) Magdaléna Rybáriková	3	7^{8}	6^{5}

=== Top half ===
First round
1	(Czech Republic) L Hradecká	6	5	6
(France) V Larrière	2	7	2
LL	(Italy) F Grazioso	6^{7}	6	2
WC	(United States) A-L Jeukeng	7^{9}	3	6
Q	(United States) M Keys	6	3	4
(Portugal) M Larcher de Brito	3	6	6
(United States) A Glatch	2	3
8	(United States) J Hampton	6	6
3	(Georgia (country)) A Tatishvili	6	6
LL	(United States) L Lee-Waters	3	2
(United States) A Riske	6	6
(Czech Republic) A Hlaváčková	3	3
(United States) A Weinhold	6	6
(United States) C Scholl	3	2
Q	(United States) J Pegula	3	5
7	(Belarus) O Govortsova	6	7

Second round
1	(Czech Republic) L Hradecká	6	7
WC	(United States) A-L Jeukeng	2	5
(Portugal) M Larcher de Brito	3	3
8	(United States) J Hampton	6	6
3	(Georgia (country)) A Tatishvili	6	7
(United States) A Riske	3	5
(United States) A Weinhold	1	1
7	(Belarus) O Govortsova	6	6

Quarterfinals
1	(Czech Republic) L Hradecká	4	6^{4}
8	(United States) J Hampton	6	7^{7}
3	(Georgia (country)) A Tatishvili	1	3
7	(Belarus) O Govortsova	6	6

Semifinals
8	(United States) J Hampton	2	4
7	(Belarus) O Govortsova	6	6

=== Bottom half ===
First round
6	(France) S Foretz Gacon	7^{8}	6
(United States) M Oudin	6^{6}	2
SR	(Belarus) D Kustova	2	4
(Russia) E Rodina	6	6
(Croatia) M Lučić	6	6
WC	(United States) J Boserup	2	3
(United States) M Brengle	6	6
4	(United States) I Falconi	1	2
5	(Canada) S Dubois	6	6
WC	(United States) A Parra	2	2
Q	(United Kingdom) S Murray	6	2	5
(United States) G Brodsky	4	6	7
LL	(Russia) Y Buchina	0	2
(Russia) V Dolonts	6	6
Q	(United States) S Rogers	3	3
2	(Slovakia) M Rybáriková	6	6

Second round
6	(France) S Foretz Gacon	3	3
(Russia) E Rodina	6	6
(Croatia) M Lučić	2	2
(United States) M Brengle	6	6
5	(Canada) S Dubois	2	2
(United States) G Brodsky	6	6
(Russia) V Dolonts	4	6^{5}
2	(Slovakia) M Rybáriková	6	7^{7}

Quarterfinals
(Russia) E Rodina	6	6
(United States) M Brengle	3	3
(United States) G Brodsky	3	6^{3}
2	(Slovakia) M Rybáriková	6	7^{7}

Semifinals
(Russia) E Rodina	1	7^{8}	6^{2}
2	(Slovakia) M Rybáriková	6	6^{6}	7^{7}
