= 2012 Dow Corning Tennis Classic =

- Date: 6–12 February
- Edition: 18th
- Location: Midland, United States

Champions

Singles
- (Belarus) Olga Govortsova

Doubles
- (Czech Republic) Andrea Hlaváčková / (Czech Republic) Lucie Hradecká
- Dow Corning Tennis Classic

The 2012 Dow Corning Tennis Classic was a professional tennis tournament played on hard courts. It was the eighteenth edition of the tournament which was part of the 2012 ITF Women's Circuit. It took place in Midland, United States from 6–12 February 2012, offering $100,000 in prize money.

== WTA entrants ==
=== Seeds ===
Country	Player	Rank^{1}	Seed
CZE	Lucie Hradecká	47	1
SVK	Magdaléna Rybáriková	70	2
GEO	Anna Tatishvili	80	3
USA	Irina Falconi	83	4
CAN	Stéphanie Dubois	87	5
FRA	Stéphanie Foretz Gacon	91	6
BLR	Olga Govortsova	97	7
USA	Jamie Hampton	117	8

- ^{1} Rankings as of January 30, 2012

=== Other entrants ===
The following players received wildcards into the singles main draw:

- (United States) Julia Boserup
- (United States) Anne-Liz Jeukeng
- (United States) Alessondra Parra

The following players received entry from the qualifying draw:

- (United States) Madison Keys
- (United Kingdom) Samantha Murray
- (United States) Jessica Pegula
- (United States) Shelby Rogers

The following players received entry as lucky losers:

- (Russia) Yana Buchina
- (Italy) Federica Grazioso
- (United States) Lindsay Lee-Waters

The following players received entry through special exempt:

- (Belarus) Darya Kustova

== Champions ==
=== Singles ===
- (Belarus) Olga Govortsova def. (Slovakia) Magdaléna Rybáriková 6–3, 6–7^{(6–8)}, 7–6^{(7–5)}

=== Doubles ===
- (Czech Republic) Andrea Hlaváčková / (Czech Republic) Lucie Hradecká def. (Russia) Vesna Dolonts / (France) Stéphanie Foretz Gacon 7–6^{(7–4)}, 6–2
