= Grapevine Women's Tennis Classic =

ITF Women's Tour
- Event name: Grapevine
- Location: Grapevine, Texas, United States
- Venue: Hilton DFW Lakes
- Category: ITF Women's Circuit
- Surface: Hard
- Draw: 32S/32Q/16D
- Prize money: $50,000

The Grapevine Women's Tennis Classic was a professional tennis tournament held on outdoor hard courts at the Hilton DFW Lakes Executive Conference Center in Grapevine, Texas, United States. It was classified as a $50,000 ITF Women's Circuit event. The tournament was held from 2009 to 2011, with there being two different editions in 2010.

== Past finals ==
=== Singles ===
Year	Champion	Runner-up	Score
2011	(Japan) Kurumi Nara	(Kazakhstan) Sesil Karatantcheva	1–6, 6–0, 6–3
2010^{(2)}	(United States) Jamie Hampton	(Japan) Kurumi Nara	6–3, 6–4
2010^{(1)}	(United States) Varvara Lepchenko	(United States) Jamie Hampton	7–6^{(7–1)}, 6–4
2009	(Canada) Valérie Tétreault	(Canada) Stéphanie Dubois	2–6, 7–6^{(8–6)}, 7–6^{(7–1)}

=== Doubles ===
Year	Champion	Runner-up	Score
2011	(United States) Jamie Hampton (China) Zhang Shuai	(United States) Lindsay Lee-Waters (United States) Megan Moulton-Levy	6–4, 6–0
2010^{(2)}	(United States) Ahsha Rolle (United States) Mashona Washington	(United States) Julie Ditty (South Africa) Chanelle Scheepers	5–7, 6–2, [11–9]
2010^{(1)}	(United States) Lindsay Lee-Waters (United States) Megan Moulton-Levy	(United States) Kimberly Couts (Ukraine) Tetiana Luzhanska	6–2, 7–5
2009	(United States) Lindsay Lee-Waters (United States) Riza Zalameda	(United States) Kimberly Couts (Canada) Valérie Tétreault	7–6^{(7–5)}, 6–3
