= 2012 Blossom Cup – Doubles =

Doubles
- 2012 Blossom Cup

Final
- Champions: (Chinese Taipei) Chan Hao-ching (Japan) Rika Fujiwara
- Runners-up: (Japan) Kimiko Date-Krumm (China) Zhang Shuai
- Score: 4–6, 6–4, [10–7]

Events
| Singles | Doubles |
| ← 2011 · | Blossom Cup | · 2013 → |

Liu Wanting and Sun Shengnan were the defending champions and seeded third, but lost in the semifinals to Chan Hao-ching and Rika Fujiwara.

Second seeds Chan Hao-ching and Rika Fujiwara won the title, they defeated the first seeds Kimiko Date-Krumm and Zhang Shuai in the final 4–6, 6–4, [10–7].

== Seeds ==
1. (Japan) Kimiko Date-Krumm / (China) Zhang Shuai (final)
2. (Chinese Taipei) Chan Hao-ching / (Japan) Rika Fujiwara (champions)
3. (China) Liu Wanting / (China) Sun Shengnan (semifinals)
4. (United States) Tetiana Luzhanska / (Germany) Kathrin Wörle (quarterfinals)

== Draw ==
=== Key ===
- Q = Qualifier
- WC = Wild card
- LL = Lucky loser
- Alt = Alternate
- SE = Special exempt
- PR = Protected ranking
- ITF = ITF entry
- JE = Junior exempt
- w/o = Walkover
- r = Retired
- d = Defaulted
- SR = Special ranking

=== Draw ===
First round
1 | (Japan) K Date-Krumm (China) S Zhang | 6 | 6
(Chinese Taipei) Y Chen (China) X Han | 1 | 1
(China) C Liang (China) J-J Lu | 7^{7} | 7^{7}
(Chinese Taipei) S-y Kao (China) Y Zhao | 6^{1} | 6^{3}
4 | (United States) T Luzhanska (Germany) K Wörle | 6 | 6
(China) Y Duan (China) Y Xu | 4 | 2
(South Korea) S-j Kim (Japan) Y Sema | 5 | 4
(Chinese Taipei) C-w Chan (Chinese Taipei) W-h Hsu | 7 | 6
(Hungary) T Babos (Israel) J Glushko | 1 | 7^{8} | [11]
WC | (China) JX Lu (China) Jia Lu | 6 | 6^{6} | [9]
(Romania) M Gojnea (Slovakia) R Tabak | 4 | 6 | [8]
3 | (China) W Liu (China) S Sun | 6 | 2 | [10]
(Georgia (country)) O Kalashnikova (United Kingdom) E Webley-Smith | 7 | 6
WC | (China) Z Yang (China) K Zhang | 5 | 4
WC | (Indonesia) Y Basuki (Hong Kong) L Zhang | 2 | 3
2 | (Chinese Taipei) H-c Chan (Japan) R Fujiwara | 6 | 6

Quarterfinals
1 | (Japan) K Date-Krumm (China) S Zhang | 6 | 6
(China) C Liang (China) J-J Lu | 4 | 4
4 | (United States) T Luzhanska (Germany) K Wörle | 6 | 3 | [9]
(Chinese Taipei) C-w Chan (Chinese Taipei) W-h Hsu | 3 | 6 | [11]
(Hungary) T Babos (Israel) J Glushko | 5 | 6 | [5]
3 | (China) W Liu (China) S Sun | 7 | 4 | [10]
(Georgia (country)) O Kalashnikova (United Kingdom) E Webley-Smith | 1 | 3
2 | (Chinese Taipei) H-c Chan (Japan) R Fujiwara | 6 | 6

Semifinals
1 | (Japan) K Date-Krumm (China) S Zhang | 6 | 6
(Chinese Taipei) C-w Chan (Chinese Taipei) W-h Hsu | 4 | 1
3 | (China) W Liu (China) S Sun | 6 | 4 | [6]
2 | (Chinese Taipei) H-c Chan (Japan) R Fujiwara | 2 | 6 | [10]

Finals
1 | (Japan) K Date-Krumm (China) S Zhang | 6 | 4 | [7]
2 | (Chinese Taipei) H-c Chan (Japan) R Fujiwara | 4 | 6 | [10]
