= Yasmin Schnack =

American tennis player

- Country (sports): United States
- Residence: Sacramento, California, U.S.
- Born: May 4, 1988 (age 37) Reno, Nevada, U.S.
- Height: 1.78 m (5 ft 10 in)
- Turned pro: June 2012
- Plays: Right (two-handed backhand)
- Prize money: $45,952

Singles
- Career record: 69–45
- Career titles: 2 ITF
- Highest ranking: No. 371 (April 30, 2012)

Doubles
- Career record: 79–42
- Career titles: 11 ITF
- Highest ranking: No. 140 (June 11, 2012)

Grand Slam doubles results
- Wimbledon: 1R (2012)

Yasmin Schnack (born May 4, 1988) is a former professional tennis player from the United States.

Her highest singles and doubles rankings are No. 371 and No. 140, respectively, both set in the 2012 season.

In her career, Schnack won two singles and eleven doubles titles on the ITF Women's Circuit. In September 2013, she played her last ITF tournament in Redding, California.

== Career ==
2012 has turned out to be the best year yet for Schnack- she won one ITF singles title and five doubles titles, two of those being $50k events.

In that same year, Yasmin also played her first match in a major tournament at Wimbledon where she entered the doubles competition with fellow American player Vania King. The pair were eliminated in the first round by Iveta Benešová and Barbora Záhlavová-Strýcová.

== ITF Circuit finals ==
Legend
$75,000 tournaments
$50,000 tournaments
$25,000 tournaments
$10,000 tournaments

=== Singles (2–2) ===
| Result | No. | Date | Tournament | Surface | Opponent | Score |
|---|---|---|---|---|---|---|
| Loss | 1. | 26 September 2010 | ITF Mazatlán, Mexico | Hard | (Mexico) Nazari Urbina | 4–6, 3–6 |
| Win | 1. | 10 October 2010 | ITF Mexico City | Hard | (Argentina) Andrea Benítez | 6–3, 6–1 |
| Loss | 2. | 14 November 2010 | ITF Manila, Philippines | Hard | (France) Élodie Rogge-Dietrich | 4–6, 0–6 |
| Win | 2. | 9 January 2012 | ITF Saint Martin, Guadeloupe | Hard | (France) Amandine Hesse | 6–7^{(4)}, 6–2, 6–1 |

=== Doubles (11–6) ===
| Result | No. | Date | Tournament | Surface | Partner | Opponents | Score |
|---|---|---|---|---|---|---|---|
| Loss | 1. | 19 July 2009 | ITF Atlanta, United States | Hard | (United States) Amanda Fink | (United States) Kaitlyn Christian (United States) Lindsey Nelson | 5–7, 6–7^{(2)} |
| Win | 1. | 20 July 2009 | ITF Evansville, United States | Hard | (United States) Maria Sanchez | (United States) Kaitlyn Christian (United States) Lindsey Nelson | 4–6, 6–1, [10–4] |
| Win | 2. | 19 September 2010 | ITF Redding, United States | Hard | (United States) Christina Fusano | (United States) Kim Anh Nguyen (Croatia) Jelena Pandžić | 6–2, 3–6, [10–6] |
| Win | 3. | 26 September 2010 | ITF Mazatlán, Mexico | Hard | (United States) Vania King | (United States) Yawna Allen (Canada) Monica Neveklovska | 6–4, 3–6, [10–5] |
| Win | 4. | 10 October 2010 | ITF Mexico City | Hard | (United States) Vania King | (United States) Elizabeth Ferris (United States) Nicole Robinson | 6–7^{(2)}, 6–3, [10–7] |
| Loss | 2. | 14 November 2010 | ITF Manila, Philippines | Hard | (United States) Ivana King | (Thailand) Peangtarn Plipuech (Thailand) Luksika Kumkhum | 4–6, 5–7 |
| Loss | 3. | 15 January 2011 | ITF Plantation, United States | Clay | (United States) Christina Fusano | (United States) Ahsha Rolle (United States) Mashona Washington | 4–6, 2–6 |
| Loss | 4. | 28 May 2011 | ITF Carson, United States | Hard | (United States) Christina Fusano | (United States) Alexandra Mueller (United States) Asia Muhammad | 2–6, 3–6 |
| Loss | 5. | 11 June 2011 | ITF El Paso, United States | Hard | (United States) Amanda Fink | (Ukraine) Alyona Sotnikova (United States) Chiara Scholl | 5–7, 6–4, [8–10] |
| Win | 5. | 18 September 2011 | ITF Redding, United States | Hard | (United States) Maria Sanchez | (United States) Brittany Augustine (United States) Whitney Jones | 7–6^{(2)}, 4–6, [10–7] |
| Loss | 6. | 12 November 2011 | ITF Phoenix, United States | Hard | (United States) Maria Sanchez | (United States) Jamie Hampton (Croatia) Ajla Tomljanović | 6–3, 3–6, [6–10] |
| Win | 6. | 16 January 2012 | ITF Le Gosier, Guadeloupe | Hard | (United States) Whitney Jones | (Israel) Keren Shlomo (Russia) Margarita Lazareva | 2–6, 6–4, [16–14] |
| Win | 7. | 30 January 2012 | Rancho Santa Fe Open, US | Hard | (United States) Maria Sanchez | (Ukraine) Irina Buryachok (Ukraine) Elizaveta Ianchuk | 7–6^{(4)}, 4–6, [10–8] |
| Win | 8. | 13 February 2012 | ITF Surprise, US | Hard | (United States) Maria Sanchez | (Romania) Mihaela Buzărnescu (Russia) Valeria Solovyeva | 6–4, 6–3 |
| Win | 9. | 23 April 2012 | Charlottesville Open, US | Clay | (United States) Maria Sanchez | (Israel) Julia Glushko (Russia) Elena Bovina | 6–2, 6–2 |
| Win | 10. | 3 June 2012 | Sacramento Challenger, US | Hard | (United States) Asia Muhammad | (United States) Kaitlyn Christian (United States) Maria Sanchez | 6–3, 7–6^{(4)} |
| Win | 11. | 23 September 2012 | ITF Albuquerque, US | Hard | (United States) Asia Muhammad | (United States) Irina Falconi (United States) Maria Sanchez | 6–2, 1–6, [12–10] |
