= Whitney Jones =

American tennis player

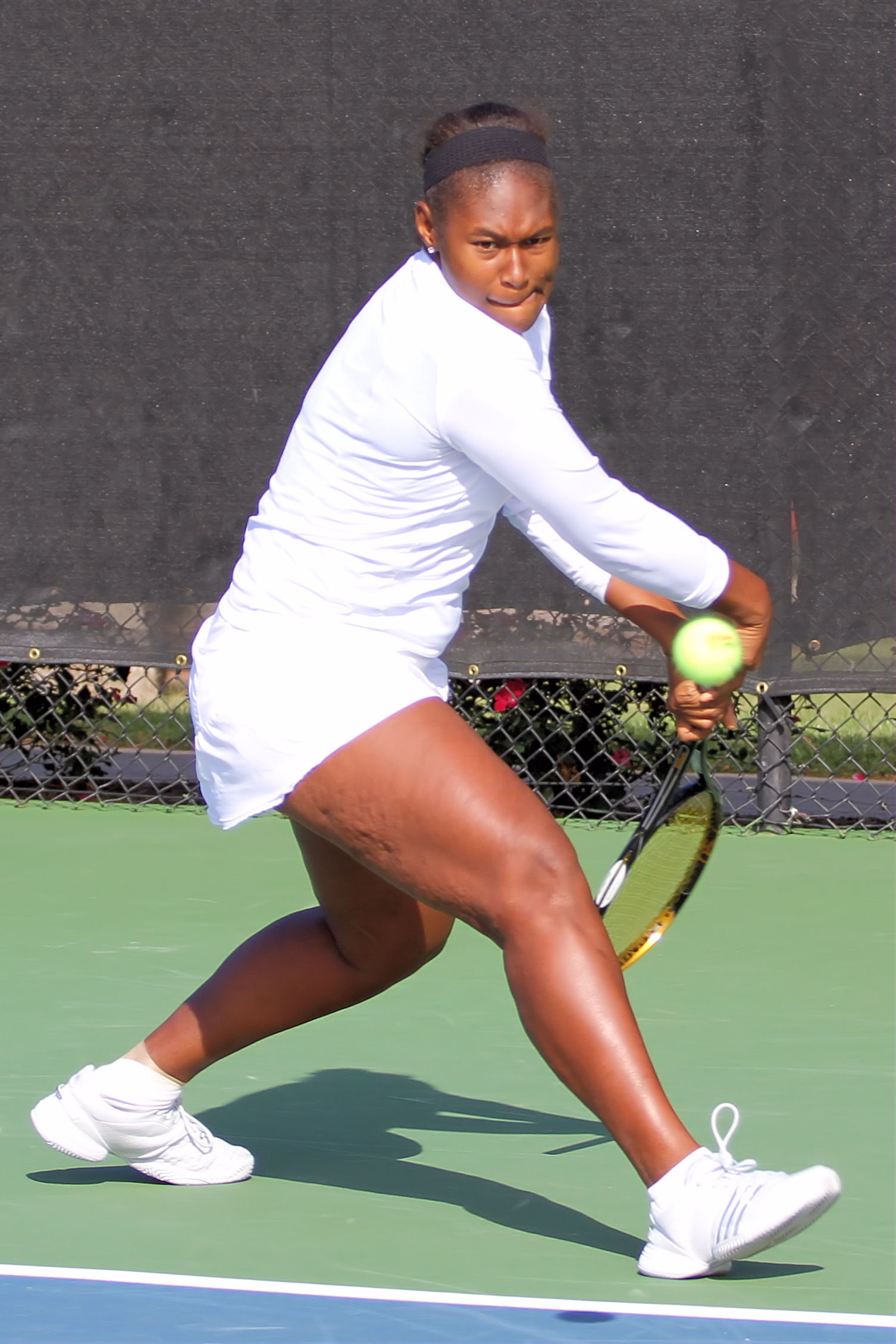
- Country (sports): United States
- Born: August 11, 1986 (age 40)
- Turned pro: 2003
- Retired: 2012
- Plays: Right (two-handed backhand)
- Prize money: $34,532

Singles
- Career record: 55–137
- Highest ranking: No. 572 (August 1, 2011)

Doubles
- Career record: 67–112
- Career titles: 1 ITF
- Highest ranking: No. 230 (October 10, 2011)

Whitney Jones (born August 11, 1986) is an American former tennis player.

In August 2011, she reached her highest singles ranking by the WTA of 572 whilst her best doubles ranking was 230 on October 10, 2011.

She played at the 2007 Sunfeast Open in the doubles draw and partnered Sandy Gumulya. Jones and Gumulya defeated Anne Keothavong and Hana Šromová in the first round, before losing to İpek Şenoğlu and Yaroslava Shvedova in the quarterfinals.

Whitney Jones resides in Washington D.C., and is a medical student at Howard University College of Medicine. She is now a resident in general surgery at Northwestern University.

== ITF Circuit finals ==
=== Doubles: 9 (1 title, 8 runner-ups) ===
Legend
$25,000 tournaments
$10,000 tournaments

Result	Date	Tournament	Surface	Partner	Opponents	Score
Loss	Jul 2008	ITF Atlanta, United States	Hard	(United States) Tiya Rolle	(United States) Sanaz Marand (United States) Kristi Miller	2–6, 4–6
Loss	May 2009	ITF Landisville, United States	Hard	(United States) Tiya Rolle	(Russia) Olga Boulytcheva (Georgia (country)) Magda Okruashvili	7–6, 5–7, [7–10]
Loss	Sep 2009	ITF Obregón, Mexico	Hard	(United States) Jamie Hampton	(Brazil) Natalia Guitler (Chile) Andrea Koch-Benvenuto	6–7, 4–6
Loss	May 2011	ITF Hilton Head, United States	Hard	(United States) Alexandra Mueller	(United States) Macall Harkins (United States) Amanda McDowell	3–6, 3–6
Loss	Jun 2011	ITF Coatzacoalcos, Mexico	Hard	(United States) Yawna Allen	(Mexico) Carolina Betancourt (Puerto Rico) Jessica Roland	1–6, 0–6
Loss	Jun 2011	ITF Zacatecas, Mexico	Hard	(United States) Hilary Toole	(Mexico) Ana Paula de la Peña (Peru) Ingrid Várgas Calvo	6–3, 5–7, [8–10]
Loss	Sep 2011	ITF Redding, United States	Hard	(United States) Brittany Augustine	(United States) Yasmin Schnack (United States) Maria Sanchez	6–7, 6–4, [7–10]
Win	Jan 2012	ITF Le Gosier, Guadeloupe (France)	Hard	(United States) Yasmin Schnack	(Israel) Keren Shlomo (Russia) Margarita Lazareva	2–6, 6–4, [16–14]
Loss	Jun 2012	ITF Williamsburg, United States	Clay	(United States) Jacqueline Cako	(United Kingdom) Laura Deigman (Australia) Julia Moriarty	4–6, 4–6
