= Brittany Augustine =

American tennis player

- Country (sports): United States
- Born: September 19, 1991 (age 34) Orlando, Florida
- Plays: Right-handed
- Prize money: $31,868

Singles
- Career record: 56–75
- Career titles: 0
- Highest ranking: No. 498 (October 18, 2010)

Doubles
- Career record: 35–56
- Career titles: 1 ITF
- Highest ranking: No. 276 (October 24, 2011)

Brittany Augustine (born September 19, 1991) is an American former professional tennis player.

Augustine was born in Orlando to Sydney and Carol Augustine, who are both originally from Trinidad and Tobago. She grew up in Carson, California.

In 2007, she had her only WTA Tour singles main-draw appearance as a wildcard entrant at the Acura Classic in San Diego, where she lost to a 19-year old Angelique Kerber, in the first round.

== ITF Circuit finals ==
Legend
$50,000 tournaments
$25,000 tournaments
$10,000 tournaments

=== Doubles: 3 (1 title, 2 runner-ups) ===
Result	No.	Date	Tournament	Surface	Partner	Opponents	Score
Loss	1.	Nov 7, 2010	Toronto Challenger, Canada	Hard	(United States) Alexandra Mueller	(Canada) Sharon Fichman (Canada) Gabriela Dabrowski	4–6, 0–6
Loss	2.	Sep 18, 2011	ITF Redding, United States	Hard	(United States) Whitney Jones	(United States) Yasmin Schnack (United States) Maria Sanchez	6–7, 6–4, 2–6
Win	1.	Oct 9, 2011	ITF Williamsburg, US	Clay	(United States) Elizabeth Lumpkin	(United States) Sylvia Krywacz (Romania) Cristina Stancu	6–3, 6–4
