= Irina Falconi =

Ecuadorian-born American tennis player (born 1990)

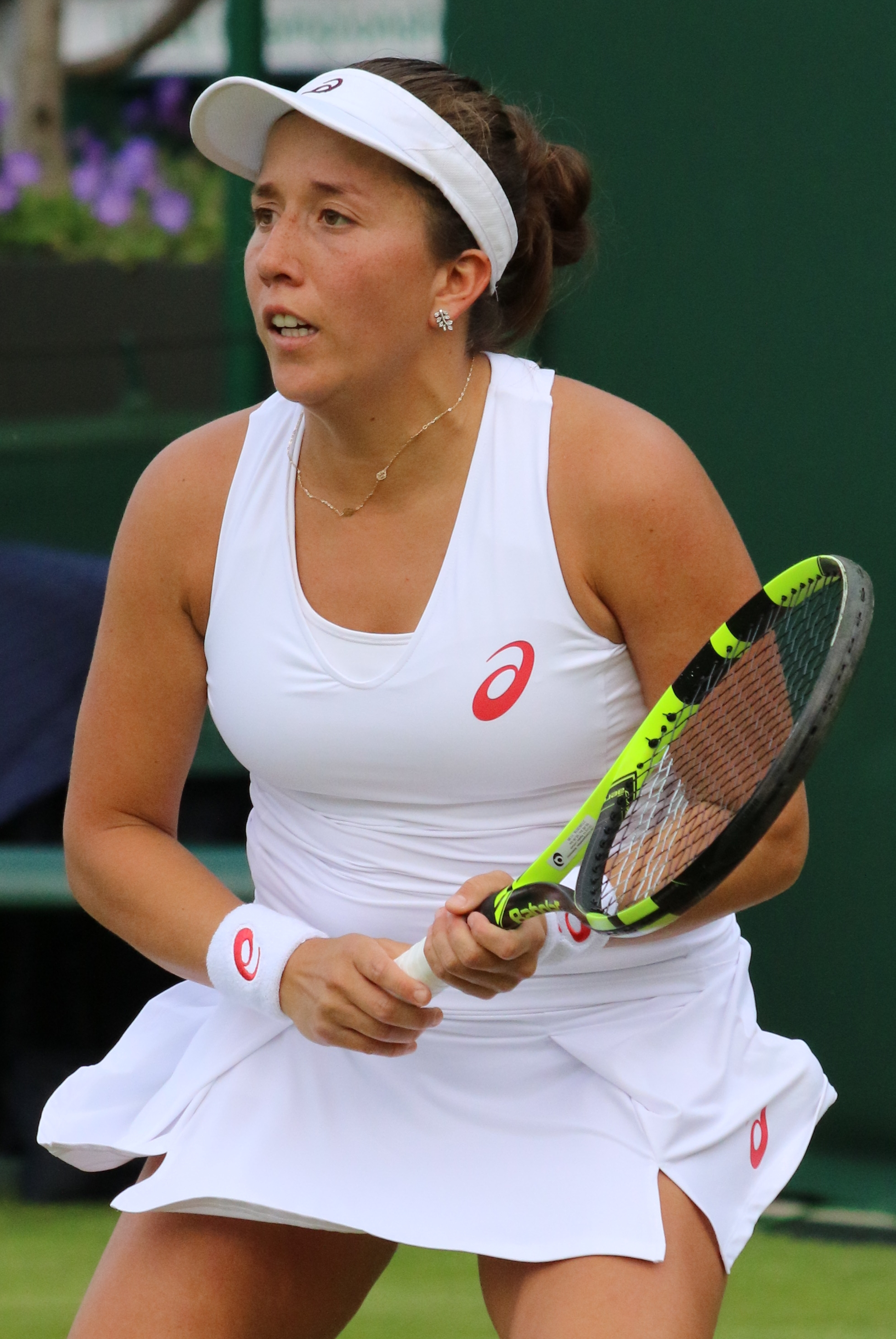
- Falconi at the 2016 Wimbledon Championships
- Full name: Irina Alejandra Falconi Hartman
- Country (sports): United States
- Residence: Lake Nona, Florida
- Born: May 4, 1990 (age 36) Portoviejo, Ecuador
- Height: 1.63 m (5 ft 4 in)
- Turned pro: 2010
- Retired: 2023
- Plays: Right (two-handed backhand)
- College: Georgia Tech
- Prize money: US$ 1,789,808

Singles
- Career record: 336–259
- Career titles: 1 WTA, 6 ITF
- Highest ranking: No. 63 (May 23, 2016)

Grand Slam singles results
- Australian Open: 2R (2014, 2015, 2016, 2017)
- French Open: 3R (2015)
- Wimbledon: 1R (2011, 2012, 2017)
- US Open: 3R (2011)

Doubles
- Career record: 133–133
- Career titles: 3 ITF
- Highest ranking: No. 70 (June 10, 2013)

Grand Slam doubles results
- Australian Open: 2R (2013, 2016)
- French Open: 1R (2013)
- Wimbledon: 2R (2012)
- US Open: 2R (2012)

Grand Slam mixed doubles results
- US Open: 1R (2012)
Medal record
Pan American Games
Gold medal – first place	2011 Guadalajara	Singles
Silver medal – second place	2011 Guadalajara	Doubles

Irina Falconi Hartman (Spanish: Falconí; born Irina Alejandra Falconi; May 4, 1990) is an Ecuadorian-born American former professional tennis player. Her highest WTA singles ranking is 63, which she reached in May 2016. Her career-high in doubles is world No. 70, set in June 2013.

Born Irina Alejandra Falconi in Portoviejo, Ecuador, she moved to Manhattan, New York, as a toddler. At the age of 14, she and her family moved to Florida. In 2021, Falconi married Travis Hartman and their daughter Isabella was born.

== Career ==
Falconi played college tennis at Georgia Tech where she was a two times ITA All-American and 2010 ACC Player of the Year.

She was given a wildcard into the 2010 US Open qualifying tournament and managed to qualify defeating Mona Barthel, Anastasia Pivovarova and Stéphanie Dubois, but lost in the main-draw first round to 19th seed Flavia Pennetta in straight sets.

At 2011 US Open was more successful for Falconi when she defeated Klára Zakopalová and 14th seed Dominika Cibulková, before losing to 22nd seed Sabine Lisicki in the third round.

She reached the third round at the 2015 French Open with wins over wildcard entrant Manon Arcangioli and qualifier Sesil Karatantcheva. Her run was ended by Julia Görges.

Falconi won her first, and only, WTA Tour title at the 2016 Copa Colsanitas, defeating Sílvia Soler Espinosa in the final.

In March 2020, she competed at the Indian Wells Challenger for the last time in a match on pro tour.

In 2021, it was reported that Falconi was working as a traveling coach for American tennis player Danielle Lao.

== Grand Slam performance timelines ==
Key
W	F	SF	QF	#R	RR	Q#	DNQ	A	NH

(W) winner; (F) finalist; (SF) semifinalist; (QF) quarterfinalist; (#R) rounds 4, 3, 2, 1; (RR) round-robin stage; (Q#) qualification round; (DNQ) did not qualify; (A) absent; (NH) not held; (SR) strike rate (events won / competed); (W–L) win–loss record.
To avoid confusion and double counting, these charts are updated at the conclusion of a tournament or when the player's participation has ended.

=== Singles ===
Tournament	2009	2010	2011	2012	2013	2014	2015	2016	2017	2018	2019	2020	W–L
Australian Open	A	A	1R	1R	Q2	2R	2R	2R	2R	1R	A	Q1	4–7
French Open	A	A	1R	2R	Q3	Q1	3R	2R	Q1	Q1	A	A	4–4
Wimbledon	A	A	1R	1R	Q3	Q3	1R	1R	1R	Q2	A	NH	0–5
US Open	Q1	1R	3R	1R	Q1	Q2	2R	1R	Q1	Q1	A	A	3–5
Win–loss	0–0	0–1	2–4	1–4	0–0	1–1	4–4	2–4	1–2	0–1	0–0	0–0	11–21

=== Doubles ===
Tournament	2011	2012	2013	2014	2015	2016	2017	W–L
Australian Open	A	1R	2R	A	1R	2R	A	2–4
French Open	A	A	1R	A	A	1R	A	0–2
Wimbledon	A	2R	1R	A	1R	1R	A	1–4
US Open	1R	2R	A	1R	1R	A	1R	1–5
Win–loss	0–1	2–3	1–3	0–1	0–3	1–3	0–1	4–15

== WTA Tour finals ==
=== Singles: 1 (title) ===
Legend International (1–0)	Finals by surface Clay (1–0)

Result	Date	Tournament	Tier	Surface	Opponent	Score	
Win	1–0	Apr 2016	Copa Colsanitas, Colombia	International	Clay	(Spain) Sílvia Soler Espinosa	6–2, 2–6, 6–4

=== Doubles: 3 (runner-ups) ===
Legend
Premier
International (0–3)

Result	W–L	Date	Tournament	Tier	Surface	Partner	Opponents	Score
Loss	0–1	Aug 2012	Washington Open, United States	International	Hard	(South Africa) Chanelle Scheepers	(Japan) Shuko Aoyama (Chinese Taipei) Chang Kai-chen	5–7, 2–6
Loss	0–2	Aug 2012	Texas Open, US	International	Hard	(Latvia) Līga Dekmeijere	(New Zealand) Marina Erakovic (United Kingdom) Heather Watson	3–6, 0–6
Loss	0–3	Apr 2015	Copa Colsanitas, Colombia	International	Clay	(United States) Shelby Rogers	(Brazil) Paula Cristina Gonçalves (Brazil) Beatriz Haddad Maia	3–6, 6–3, [6–10]

== ITF Circuit finals ==
Legend
$100,000 tournaments
$75,000 tournaments
$50,000 tournaments
$25,000 tournaments
$10,000 tournaments

=== Singles: 14 (6 titles, 8 runner-ups) ===
Result	W–L	Date	Tournament	Tier	Surface	Opponent	Score
Loss	0–1	May 2007	ITF Los Mochis, Mexico	10,000	Hard	(Brazil) Maria Fernanda Alves	6–2, 6–0
Win	1–1	May 2007	ITF Monterrey, Mexico	10,000	Hard	(United States) Courtney Nagle	2–6, 6–3, 6–4
Win	2–1	Jul 2009	ITF Atlanta, United States	10,000	Hard	(United States) Jennifer Elie	6–0, 6–4
Win	3–1	Jul 2009	ITF St. Joseph, United States	10,000	Hard	(United States) Caitlin Whoriskey	6–3, 6–3
Win	4–1	Jul 2010	ITF Atlanta, United States	10,000	Hard	(United States) Allie Will	6–1, 6–4
Loss	4–2	Oct 2010	ITF Rock Hill, United States	25,000	Hard	(Italy) Camila Giorgi	6–3, 6–4
Loss	4–3	Feb 2011	Midland Tennis Classic, US	100,000	Hard	(Czech Republic) Lucie Hradecká	6–4, 6–4
Loss	4–4	Apr 2012	Charlottesville Open, US	50,000	Clay	(United States) Melanie Oudin	7–6^{(0)}, 3–6, 1–6
Loss	4–5	Oct 2013	ITF Perth, Australia	25,000	Hard	(Australia) Arina Rodionova	5–7, 4–6
Loss	4–6	Oct 2013	ITF Margaret River, Australia	25,000	Hard	(Estonia) Anett Kontaveit	2–6, 4–6
Loss	4–7	Sep 2014	Albuquerque Championships, US	75,000	Hard	(United States) Anna Tatishvili	2–6, 4–6
Win	5–7	Nov 2014	ITF New Braunfels, US	50,000	Hard	(United States) Jennifer Brady	7–6^{(3)}, 6–2
Loss	5–8	Feb 2015	Burnie International, Australia	50,000	Hard	(Russia) Daria Gavrilova	5–7, 5–7
Win	6–8	Sep 2017	Abierto Tampico, Mexico	100,000+H	Hard	(United States) Louisa Chirico	7–5, 6–7^{(3)}, 6–1

=== Doubles: 14 (3 titles, 11 runner-ups) ===
Result	W–L	Date	Tournament	Tier	Surface	Partner	Opponents	Score
Win	1–0	Jul 2009	ITF St. Joseph, United States	10,000	Hard	(United States) Ashley Weinhold	(United States) Chelsea Orr (United States) Caitlin Whoriskey	6–4, 7–6^{(6)}
Loss	1–1	Jul 2010	ITF Atlanta, US	10,000	Hard	(United States) Maria Sanchez	(United States) Kristy Frilling (Israel) Julia Glushko	2–6, 6–2, 4–6
Loss	1–2	Aug 2010	Vancouver Open, Canada	75,000	Hard	(United States) Amanda Fink	(Chinese Taipei) Chang Kai-chen (Canada) Heidi El Tabakh	6–3, 3–6, [4–10]
Loss	1–3	Sep 2010	Las Vegas Open, US	50,000	Hard	(United States) Maria Sanchez	(United States) Lindsay Lee-Waters (United States) Megan Moulton-Levy	6–1, 5–7, 4–6
Loss	1–4	Oct 2010	ITF Kansas City, US	50,000	Hard	(United States) Lauren Albanese	(United States) Julie Ditty (United States) Abigail Spears	2–6, 6–4, 4–6
Loss	1–5	Feb 2011	Midland Tennis Classic, US	100,000	Hard	(United States) Alison Riske	(United States) Jamie Hampton (Georgia (country)) Anna Tatishvili	w/o
Loss	1–6	Sep 2012	Albuquerque Championships, US	75,000	Hard	(United States) Maria Sanchez	(United States) Yasmin Schnack (United States) Asia Muhammad	2–6, 6–1, [10–12]
Loss	1–7	Apr 2013	Dothan Pro Classic, US	50,000	Hard	(United States) Maria Sanchez	(United States) Julia Cohen (Germany) Tatjana Maria	4–6, 6–4, [9–11]
Loss	1–8	May 2013	Prague Open, Czech Republic	100,000	Clay	(Czech Republic) Eva Hrdinová	(Czech Republic) Renata Voráčová (Czech Republic) Barbora Záhlavová-Strýcová	4–6, 0–6
Loss	1–9	Jul 2013	Yakima Challenger, US	50,000	Hard	(United Kingdom) Naomi Broady	(United States) Jan Abaza (United States) Allie Will	5–7, 6–3, [3–10]
Win	2–9	Jul 2013	Portland Challenger, US	50,000	Hard	(United States) Nicole Melichar	(United States) Sanaz Marand (United States) Ashley Weinhold	4–6, 6–3, [10–8]
Loss	2–10	Mar 2014	Osprey Challenger, US	50,000	Clay	(Czech Republic) Eva Hrdinová	(Chinese Taipei) Hsieh Shu-ying (Japan) Rika Fujiwara	3–6, 7–6^{(5)}, [4–10]
Loss	2–11	Apr 2014	Charlottesville Open, US	50,000	Clay	(United States) Maria Sanchez	(United States) Asia Muhammad (United States) Taylor Townsend	3–6, 1–6
Win	3–11	Feb 2015	Burnie International, Australia	50,000	Hard	(Croatia) Petra Martić	(China) Han Xinyun (Japan) Junri Namigata	6–2, 6–4

== See also ==
- List of Georgia Institute of Technology athletes
