= Jamie Hampton =

American tennis player (born 1990)

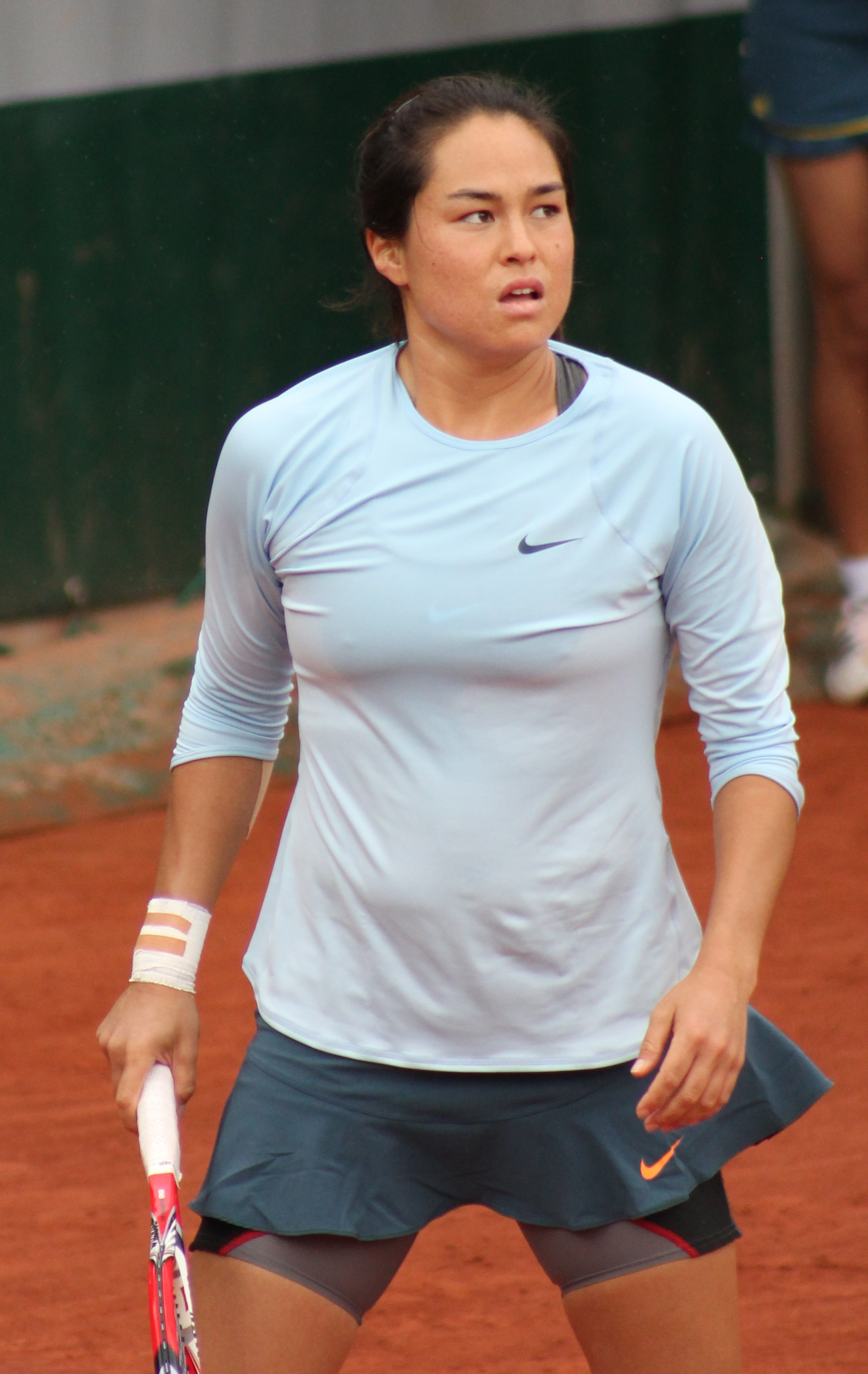
- Hampton at the 2013 French Open
- Full name: Jamie Lee Hampton
- Country (sports): United States
- Residence: Auburn, Alabama, U.S.
- Born: January 8, 1990 (age 36) Frankfurt, West Germany
- Height: 5 ft 8 in (1.73 m)
- Turned pro: September 2009
- Retired: May 2020
- Plays: Right-handed (two-handed backhand)
- Prize money: US$ 1,017,477

Singles
- Career record: 184–113
- Career titles: 5 ITF
- Highest ranking: No. 24 (July 29, 2013)

Grand Slam singles results
- Australian Open: 3R (2013)
- French Open: 4R (2013)
- Wimbledon: 2R (2012)
- US Open: 3R (2013)

Doubles
- Career record: 47–40
- Career titles: 5 ITF
- Highest ranking: No. 74 (May 21, 2012)

Grand Slam doubles results
- US Open: 2R (2010)

Jamie Lee Hampton (born January 8, 1990) is an American former professional tennis player. In July 2013, she reached her highest singles ranking of world No. 24. Due to many injuries, she needed to stop playing in 2014, and officially retired in 2020.

== Early life ==
Hampton was born in Frankfurt, West Germany, because her father, a career US Army officer, was stationed in Germany at the time. Her mother is from South Korea. Soon after, the family moved to the United States. She lived in Enterprise, Alabama, until she was 13; then, she moved to Auburn, Alabama and trained with tennis coach Geoff Waring in Montgomery, Alabama. Before graduating from Auburn High School in 2008, Hampton twice won the USTA Girls’ 18s doubles title. Hampton turned pro in 2009, playing her first US Open in 2010.

== Professional career ==
=== 2012 ===
After qualifying for the Auckland Open, Hampton fell in the first round to Monica Niculescu. As a qualifier, she advanced to the second round of the Australian Open with a win over Mandy Minella. She was then beaten by the eventual finalist, Maria Sharapova. Next, Hampton played in Memphis International where she beat defending champion Magdaléna Rybáriková in the first round, but then fell to Vera Dushevina.

She then received a wildcard into the Indian Wells Open where she made it into the fourth round before having to retire due to cramping against Agnieszka Radwańska, having defeated former champion Jelena Janković in the second round en route. Hampton had to go through qualifying to play in the Miami Open, and then lost in the first round to Polona Hercog. Her next tournament was the Charleston Cup. She beat compatriot Sloane Stephens but then lost to US Open champion Samantha Stosur in the second round.

While struggling with back injuries during the clay court season, Hampton lost in qualifying at the Italian Open and Internationaux de Strasbourg. She was forced to retire in the first round of the French Open against Arantxa Rus due to an injury. After withdrawing from the Aegon Classic, Hampton upset 27th seed Daniela Hantuchová in the first round of Wimbledon. In the second round, she lost to Heather Watson.

Next up for Hampton was the US Open, where she lost in the first round to Marion Bartoli. Her next tournament was the Korea Open where she went through qualifying. She then advanced to the second round but was beaten by Ekaterina Makarova. The next week, Hampton played in the Pan Pacific Open. After advancing to the third round with wins over Caroline Garcia and Kaia Kanepi, she fell short to Agnieszka Radwańska.

Her last tournament of the year was the Osaka Open in Japan. She defeated Ayumi Morita and Tamarine Tanasugarn to get to the quarterfinals where she lost to top seed Samantha Stosur. With her best year on tour to date, Hampton ended the year ranked 71 in singles.

=== 2013 ===
Hampton started off 2013 by playing in Auckland. In the first round, she defeated defending champion and fourth seed, Zheng Jie. In the next round, Hampton beat Marina Erakovic to get a place in the quarterfinals. She defeated Kiki Bertens in the quarterfinals. Hampton lost a tight two-set semifinal with two tiebreaks to world No. 4 and eventual champion Agnieszka Radwańska.

Her next tournament was the Australian Open. In the first round, she upset 31st seed Urszula Radwańska. Hampton then defeated qualifier Luksika Kumkhum. In the third round, she faced defending champion Victoria Azarenka. The match lasted over two hours before Azarenka prevailed in three sets. Hampton suffered a lower-back injury late in the second set.

At the Brussels Open, Hampton defeated second seed Roberta Vinci to reach the semifinals, but lost in straight sets to Kaia Kanepi.

At the French Open, Hampton defeated 25th seed Lucie Šafářová in the first round in a three sets and then Anna Karolína Schmiedlová in the second round. She defeated seventh seed Petra Kvitová in the third round in straight sets, before she lost to Jelena Janković in the fourth round.

After qualifying for the Eastbourne International, Hampton upset top seed and world No. 4, Agnieszka Radwańska, in straight sets in the first round, and then went on to beat Caroline Wozniacki in the semifinals to reach her first WTA tournament final. She lost in the final to Elena Vesnina in straight sets. Hampton lost to Sloane Stephens in the first round of Wimbledon.

As fourth seed at the Stanford Classic in California, she defeated Nicole Gibbs and Vera Dushevina to reach the semifinals, where she lost to top seed Agnieszka Radwańska. With this result, she reached a career-high ranking of No. 24.

At the US Open, where Hampton was seeded at a Major for the first time, she reached the third round, but was again defeated by Sloane Stephens.

=== 2014 ===
Hampton had a strong start to her 2014 season, recording wins over wildcard entrant Tamira Paszek, qualifier Kristýna Plíšková and Lauren Davis to advance to the semifinals in Auckland, when she was forced to withdraw due to a hip injury before taking to the court against Venus Williams.

Ranked at world No. 27, she subsequently withdrew from the Australian Open, and then underwent six surgeries over the next 18 months.

=== 2020: Retirement ===
In May 2020, six years after playing her last match on tour, Hampton announced on Twitter that she was retiring from the tour due to nagging injuries.

== Grand Slam performance timelines ==
Key
W	F	SF	QF	#R	RR	Q#	P#	DNQ	A	Z#	PO	G	S	B	NMS	NTI	P	NH

(W) winner; (F) finalist; (SF) semifinalist; (QF) quarterfinalist; (#R) rounds 4, 3, 2, 1; (RR) round-robin stage; (Q#) qualification round; (P#) preliminary round; (DNQ) did not qualify; (A) absent; (Z#) Davis/Fed Cup Zonal Group (with number indication) or (PO) play-off; (G) gold, (S) silver or (B) bronze Olympic/Paralympic medal; (NMS) not a Masters tournament; (NTI) not a Tier I tournament; (P) postponed; (NH) not held; (SR) strike rate (events won / competed); (W–L) win–loss record.
To avoid confusion and double counting, these charts are updated at the conclusion of a tournament or when the player's participation has ended.

Tournament	2010	2011	2012	2013	SR	W–L
Australian Open	A	1R	2R	3R	0 / 3	3–3
French Open	A	LQ	1R	4R	0 / 2	3–2
Wimbledon	A	A	2R	1R	0 / 1	1–2
US Open	1R	1R	1R	3R	0 / 4	2–4
Win–loss	0–1	0–2	2–4	7–4	0 / 11	9–11

Tournament	2006	2007	2008	2009	2010	2011	SR	W–L
Australian Open	A	A	A	A	A	A	0 / 0	0–0
French Open	A	A	A	A	A	A	0 / 0	0–0
Wimbledon	A	A	A	A	A	A	0 / 0	0–0
US Open	1R	1R	1R	A	2R	1R	0 / 5	1–5
Win–loss	0–1	0–1	0–1	0–0	1–1	0–1	0 / 5	1–5

== WTA career finals ==
=== Singles: 1 (runner-up) ===
Legend
Grand Slam tournaments (0–0)
Premier M & Premier 5 (0–0)
Premier (0–1)
International (0–0)

Result	Date	Tournament	Tier	Surface	Opponent	Score
Loss	Jun 2013	Eastbourne International, UK	Premier	Grass	(Russia) Elena Vesnina	2–6, 1–6

=== Doubles: 1 (runner-up) ===
Legend
Grand Slam tournaments (0–0)
Premier M & Premier 5 (0–0)
Premier (0–0)
International (0–1)

Result	Date	Tournament	Tier	Surface	Partner	Opponents	Score
Loss	Sep 2011	Bell Challenge, Canada	International	Hard	(Georgia (country)) Anna Tatishvili	(United States) Raquel Kops-Jones (United States) Abigail Spears	1–6, 6–3, [6–10]

== ITF Circuit finals ==
$100,000 tournaments
$75,000 tournaments
$50,000 tournaments
$25,000 tournaments
$10,000 tournaments

=== Singles: 12 (5–7) ===
Result	W–L	Date	Location	Tier	Surface	Opponent	Score
Loss	1.	25 June 2006	ITF Fort Worth, United States	10,000	Hard	(United States) Alexa Glatch	4–6, 1–6
Loss	2.	23 June 2008	ITF Wichita, United States	10,000	Hard	(United States) Lauren Embree	3–6, 4–6
Win	3.	18 October 2009	ITF Cleveland, United States	10,000	Hard	(United States) Kyle Mcphillips	6-4, 6-1
Loss	4.	24 January 2010	ITF Lutz, United States	25,000	Clay	(Luxembourg) Mandy Minella	2–6, 6–4, 2–6
Loss	5.	7 March 2010	ITF Hammond, United States	25,000	Hard	(China) Zhang Shuai	2–6, 1–6
Loss	6.	11 April 2010	ITF Jackson, United States	25,000	Clay	(Croatia) Mirjana Lučić-Baroni	5–7, 3–6
Win	7.	18 April 2010	ITF Osprey, United States	25,000	Clay	(Argentina) Florencia Molinero	6–1, 6–3
Win	8.	27 June 2010	Boston Challenger, United States	50,000	Hard	(United States) Madison Brengle	6–2, 6–1
Win	9.	11 July 2010	ITF Grapevine, United States	50,000	Hard	(Japan) Kurumi Nara	6–3, 6–4
Win	10.	13 September 2010	ITF Redding, United States	25,000	Hard	(Croatia) Jelena Pandžić	3–6, 6–1, 6–4
Loss	11.	7 November 2010	Grapevine Classic, United States	50,000	Hard	Varvara Lepchenko	6–7^{(1)}, 4–6
Loss	12.	7 August 2011	Vancouver Open, Canada	100,000	Hard	(Canada) Aleksandra Wozniak	3–6, 1–6

=== Doubles: 9 (5–4) ===
Result	W–L	Date	Tournament	Tier	Surface	Partner	Opponents	Score
Loss	1.	21 September 2009	ITF Obregón, Mexico	10,000	Hard	(United States) Whitney Jones	(Brazil) Natalia Guitler (Chile) Andrea Koch-Benvenuto	6–7, 4–6
Win	2.	18 October 2009	ITF Cleveland, United States	10,000	Clay	(United States) Grace Min	(United States) Taraka Bertrand (United States) Elizabeth Lumpkin	6–1, 6–2
Loss	3.	8 November 2009	ITF Rock Hill, United States	25,000	Clay	(United States) Lauren Albanese	(Canada) Sharon Fichman (United States) Anna Tatishvili	6–7^{(5)}, 6–4, [3–10]
Win	4.	3 April 2010	ITF Pelham, United States	25,000	Clay	(United States) Mallory Cecil	(Chinese Taipei) Chan Chin-wei (Australia) Nicole Kriz	6–4, 6–3
Win	5.	13 February 2011	ITF Midland, United States	100,000	Hard	(United States) Anna Tatishvili	(United States) Irina Falconi (United States) Alison Riske	w/o
Loss	6.	7 August 2011	Vancouver Open, Canada	100,000	Hard	(Thailand) Noppawan Lertcheewakarn	(Czech Republic) Kristýna Plíšková (Czech Republic) Karolína Plíšková	7–5, 2–6, [2–10]
Loss	7.	9 October 2011	Kansas City Classic, United States	50,000	Hard	(Australia) Ajla Tomljanović	(Croatia) Maria Abramović (Czech Republic) Eva Hrdinová	6–2, 2–6, [4–10]
Win	8.	1 November 2011	Grapevine Classic, United States	50,000	Hard	(China) Zhang Shuai	(United States) Lindsay Lee-Waters (United States) Megan Moulton-Levy	6–4, 6–0
Win	9.	13 November 2011	Phoenix Classic, United States	75,000	Hard	(Australia) Ajla Tomljanović	(United States) Maria Sanchez (United States) Yasmin Schnack	3–6, 6–3, 6–3
