= 2013 Coleman Vision Tennis Championships =

- Date: September 16–22
- Edition: 15th
- Prize money: $75,000
- Surface: Hard
- Location: Albuquerque, New Mexico, United States

Champions

Singles
- (United States) Shelby Rogers

Doubles
- (Greece) Eleni Daniilidou / (United States) Coco Vandeweghe
← 2012 ·	Coleman Vision Tennis Championships	· 2014 →

The 2013 Coleman Vision Tennis Championships was a professional tennis tournament played on outdoor hard courts. It was the fifteenth edition of the tournament which was part of the 2013 ITF Women's Circuit, offering a total of $75,000 in prize money. It took place in Albuquerque, New Mexico, United States, on September 16–22, 2013.

== WTA entrants ==
=== Seeds ===
Country	Player	Rank^{1}	Seed
USA	Alison Riske	57	1
POR	Michelle Larcher de Brito	98	2
CRO	Mirjana Lučić-Baroni	111	3
USA	Maria Sanchez	116	4
GRE	Eleni Daniilidou	129	5
USA	Melanie Oudin	130	6
USA	Grace Min	133	7
USA	Shelby Rogers	135	8

- ^{1} Rankings as of September 9, 2013

=== Other entrants ===
The following players received wildcards into the singles main draw:

- (United States) Samantha Crawford
- (United States) Hsu Chieh-yu
- (United States) Asia Muhammad
- (United States) Maria Sanchez

The following players received entry from the qualifying draw:

- (United States) Brooke Austin
- (Germany) Kristina Barrois
- (United States) Sachia Vickery
- (United States) Caitlin Whoriskey

The following players received entry into the singles main draw as lucky losers:

- (United States) Tori Kinard
- (United States) Nicole Melichar

== Champions ==
=== Singles ===
- (United States) Shelby Rogers def. (Georgia (country)) Anna Tatishvili 6–2, 6–3

=== Doubles ===
- (Greece) Eleni Daniilidou / (United States) Coco Vandeweghe def. (United States) Melanie Oudin / (United States) Taylor Townsend 6–4, 7–6^{(7–2)}
