= 2011 Coleman Vision Tennis Championships – Singles =

Singles
- 2011 Coleman Vision Tennis Championships

Final
- Champion: (Russia) Regina Kulikova
- Runner-up: (Georgia (country)) Anna Tatishvili
- Score: 7–5, 6–3

Events
Singles	Doubles
← 2010 ·	Coleman Vision Tennis Championships	· 2012 →

Mirjana Lučić was the defending champion, but lost in the quarterfinals to Regina Kulikova.
Regina Kulikova won the title by defeating Anna Tatishvili in the final 7–5, 6–3.

== Seeds ==
1. (Georgia (country)) Anna Tatishvili (final)
2. (Romania) Edina Gallovits-Hall (semifinals)
3. (Croatia) Mirjana Lučić (quarterfinals)
4. (Canada) Aleksandra Wozniak (semifinals, retired)
5. (Germany) Kathrin Wörle (first round)
6. (United States) Jamie Hampton (second round)
7. (United States) Melanie Oudin (second round)
8. (United States) Alexa Glatch (second round)

== Main draw ==
=== Key ===
- Q = Qualifier
- WC = Wild card
- LL = Lucky loser
- Alt = Alternate
- SE = Special exempt
- PR = Protected ranking
- ITF = ITF entry
- JE = Junior exempt
- w/o = Walkover
- r = Retired
- d = Defaulted
- SR = Special ranking

=== Finals ===
Semifinals
1	(Georgia (country)) Anna Tatishvili	6	1	5
4	(Canada) Aleksandra Wozniak	3	6	1^{r}
(Russia) Regina Kulikova	6	6
2	(Romania) Edina Gallovits-Hall	3	0

Final
1	(Georgia (country)) Anna Tatishvili	5	3
(Russia) Regina Kulikova	7	6

=== Top half ===
First round
1	(Georgia (country)) A Tatishvili	7^{7}	6
(Portugal) M Larcher de Brito	6^{4}	2
(Slovenia) P Rampre	3	6	1
(France) I Pavlovic	6	2	6
WC	(Denmark) M Ejdesgaard	2	1
WC	(United States) L Davis	6	6
Q	(United States) A Muhammad	6	6
5	(Germany) K Wörle	4	3
4	(Canada) A Wozniak	6	6
(United States) C Scholl	1	1
(United States) A Weinhold	6	7^{7}
Q	(Puerto Rico) J Roland-Rosario	3	6^{5}
(Italy) C Giorgi	6	6
Q	(Russia) E Bovina	1	2
(Croatia) A Tomljanović	6	3	4
6/WC	(United States) J Hampton	4	6	6

Second round
1	(Georgia (country)) A Tatishvili	6	6
(France) I Pavlovic	4	2
WC	(United States) L Davis	6	7
Q	(United States) A Muhammad	1	5
4	(Canada) A Wozniak	4	6	6
(United States) A Weinhold	6	0	2
(Italy) C Giorgi	6	6
6/WC	(United States) J Hampton	1	3

Quarterfinals
1	(Georgia (country)) A Tatishvili	2	6	6
WC	(United States) L Davis	6	4	1
4	(Canada) A Wozniak	6	6
(Italy) C Giorgi	4	4

Semifinals
1	(Georgia (country)) A Tatishvili	6	1	5
4	(Canada) A Wozniak	3	6	1^{r}

=== Bottom half ===
First round
7	(United States) M Oudin	6	6^{5}	6
(Japan) K Nara	4	7^{7}	2
(Russia) R Kulikova	6	6
JE	(Russia) D Gavrilova	2	0
(Russia) Y Putintseva	5	6^{5}
(United States) L Lee-Waters	7	7^{7}
(Hungary) M Czink	5	0^{r}
3	(Croatia) M Lučić	7	2
8	(United States) A Glatch	6	6
(United States) J Boserup	2	2
Q	(Switzerland) A Sadiković	6	6^{2}	4
LL	(United States) A Fink	3	7^{7}	6
WC	(United States) G Min	2	3
(United States) A Rolle	6	6
(United States) M Brengle	4	7^{7}	2
2	(Romania) E Gallovits-Hall	6	6^{4}	6

Second round
7	(United States) M Oudin	4	4
(Russia) R Kulikova	6	6
(United States) L Lee-Waters	3	2
3	(Croatia) M Lučić	6	6
8	(United States) A Glatch	1	4
LL	(United States) A Fink	6	6
(United States) A Rolle	4	1
2	(Romania) E Gallovits-Hall	6	6

Quarterfinals
(Russia) R Kulikova	3	6	7
3	(Croatia) M Lučić	6	3	5
LL	(United States) A Fink	7	4	2
2	(Romania) E Gallovits-Hall	5	6	6

Semifinals
(Russia) R Kulikova	6	6
2	(Romania) E Gallovits-Hall	3	0
