= 2013 Coleman Vision Tennis Championships – Singles =

Singles
- 2013 Coleman Vision Tennis Championships

Final
- Champion: (United States) Shelby Rogers
- Runner-up: (Georgia (country)) Anna Tatishvili
- Score: 6–2, 6–3

Events
Singles	Doubles
← 2012 ·	Coleman Vision Tennis Championships	· 2014 →

Maria Sanchez was the defending champion, but she lost in the first round to Anna Tatishvili.

Shelby Rogers won the tournament, defeating Anna Tatishvili in the final, 6–2, 6–3.

== Seeds ==
1. (United States) Alison Riske (semifinal)
2. (Portugal) ~~Michelle Larcher de Brito~~ (withdrew)
3. (Croatia) Mirjana Lučić-Baroni (second round)
4. (United States) Maria Sanchez (first round)
5. (Greece) Eleni Daniilidou (second round)
6. (United States) Melanie Oudin (second round)
7. (United States) Grace Min (first round)
8. (United States) Shelby Rogers (champion)

== Main draw ==
=== Key ===
- Q = Qualifier
- WC = Wild card
- LL = Lucky loser
- Alt = Alternate
- SE = Special exempt
- PR = Protected ranking
- ITF = ITF entry
- JE = Junior exempt
- w/o = Walkover
- r = Retired
- d = Defaulted
- SR = Special ranking

=== Finals ===
Semifinals
1	(United States) Alison Riske	6	5	5
(Georgia (country)) Anna Tatishvili	3	7	7
WC	(United States) Chieh-yu Hsu	2	6	6^{1}
8	(United States) Shelby Rogers	6	4	7^{7}

Final
(Georgia (country)) Anna Tatishvili	2	3
8	(United States) Shelby Rogers	6	6

=== Top half ===
First round
1	(United States) A Riske	6	4	7^{7}
(United States) I Falconi	3	6	6^{4}
WC	(United States) S Crawford	2	5
(United States) M Brengle	6	7
(United States) C Vandeweghe	6	7^{7}
(South Africa) C Simmonds	4	6^{2}
LL	(United States) T Kinard	1	2
5	(Greece) E Daniilidou	6	6
4/WC	(United States) M Sanchez	4	6^{2}
(Georgia (country)) A Tatishvili	6	7^{7}
(Austria) T Paszek	6	1	6
(Australia) O Rogowska	1	6	3
(Canada) S Dubois	6	6
(Kazakhstan) S Karatantcheva	3	2
Q	(Germany) K Barrois	1	6	7^{8}
7	(United States) G Min	6	2	6^{6}

Second round
1	(United States) A Riske	6	6
(United States) M Brengle	4	2
(United States) C Vandeweghe	6	6
5	(Greece) E Daniilidou	0	3
(Georgia (country)) A Tatishvili	7	6
(Austria) T Paszek	5	2
(Canada) S Dubois	4	2
Q	(Germany) K Barrois	6	6

Quarterfinals
1	(United States) A Riske	4	6	6
(United States) C Vandeweghe	6	1	3
(Georgia (country)) A Tatishvili	6	6
Q	(Germany) K Barrois	2	2

Semifinals
1	(United States) A Riske	6	5	5
(Georgia (country)) A Tatishvili	3	7	7

=== Bottom half ===
First round
6	(United States) M Oudin	6^{8}	7^{7}	6
(Australia) S Jones	7^{10}	6^{5}	1
(Slovenia) P Rampre	6	6
LL	(United States) N Melichar	4	2
(Croatia) T Mrdeža	4	3
WC	(United States) C-y Hsu	6	6
WC	(United States) A Muhammad	4	4
3	(Croatia) M Lučić-Baroni	6	6
8	(United States) S Rogers	3	7	6
Q	(United States) C Whoriskey	6	5	2
(Paraguay) V Cepede Royg	6	6
Q	(United States) B Austin	3	4
(Switzerland) A Sadiković	7	6^{2}	2
(United States) J Pegula	5	7^{7}	6
Q	(United States) S Vickery	6	6
LL	(Canada) J O'Neill	2	1

Second round
6	(United States) M Oudin	5	6	4
(Slovenia) P Rampre	7	1	6
WC	(United States) C-y Hsu	6	6
3	(Croatia) M Lučić-Baroni	4	3
8	(United States) S Rogers	6	6
(Paraguay) V Cepede Royg	2	3
(United States) J Pegula
Q	(United States) S Vickery	w/o

Quarterfinals
(Slovenia) P Rampre	5	0
WC	(United States) C-y Hsu	7	6
8	(United States) S Rogers	6	6
Q	(United States) S Vickery	4	4

Semifinals
WC	(United States) C-y Hsu	2	6	6^{1}
8	(United States) S Rogers	6	4	7^{7}
