= 2011 Coleman Vision Tennis Championships =

- Date: 19–25 September 2011
- Edition: 12th
- Surface: hard courts
- Location: Albuquerque, New Mexico, United States

Champions

Singles
- (Russia) Regina Kulikova

Doubles
- (United States) Alexa Glatch / (United States) Asia Muhammad
← 2010 ·	Coleman Vision Tennis Championships	· 2012 →

The 2011 Coleman Vision Tennis Championships was a professional tennis tournament played on hard courts. It was the twelfth edition of the tournament, which is part of the 2011 ITF Women's Circuit. It took place in Albuquerque, New Mexico, United States, between 19 and 25 September 2011.

== WTA entrants ==
=== Seeds ===
Country	Player	Rank^{1}	Seed
GEO	Anna Tatishvili	91	1
ROU	Edina Gallovits-Hall	101	2
CRO	Mirjana Lučić	104	3
CAN	Aleksandra Wozniak	123	4
GER	Kathrin Wörle	125	5
USA	Jamie Hampton	126	6
USA	Melanie Oudin	128	7
USA	Alexa Glatch	139	8

- ^{1} Rankings are as of September 12, 2011.

=== Other entrants ===
The following players received wildcards into the singles main draw:

- (United States) Lauren Davis
- (Denmark) Malou Ejdesgaard
- (United States) Jamie Hampton
- (United States) Grace Min

The following players received entry from the qualifying draw:

- (Russia) Elena Bovina
- (United States) Asia Muhammad
- (Puerto Rico) Jessica Roland-Rosario
- (Switzerland) Amra Sadiković

The following players received entry by a lucky loser spot:

- (United States) Amanda Fink

== Champions ==
=== Singles ===
(Russia) Regina Kulikova def. (Georgia (country)) Anna Tatishvili, 7–5, 6–3

=== Doubles ===
(United States) Alexa Glatch / (United States) Asia Muhammad def. (United States) Grace Min / (United States) Melanie Oudin, 4–6, 6–3, [10–2]
