= 2012 Coleman Vision Tennis Championships =

- Date: September 17–23
- Edition: 14th
- Location: Albuquerque, New Mexico, United States

Champions

Singles
- (United States) Maria Sanchez

Doubles
- (United States) Asia Muhammad / (United States) Yasmin Schnack
← 2011 ·	Coleman Vision Tennis Championships	· 2013 →

The 2012 Coleman Vision Tennis Championships was a professional tennis tournament played on hard courts. It was the fourteenth edition of the tournament which was part of the 2012 ITF Women's Circuit. It took place in Albuquerque, New Mexico, United States on September 17–23, 2012.

== WTA entrants ==
=== Seeds ===
Country	Player	Rank^{1}	Seed
ROU	Edina Gallovits-Hall	114	1
POR	Michelle Larcher de Brito	120	2
USA	Lauren Davis	129	3
AUS	Anastasia Rodionova	130	4
USA	Irina Falconi	147	5
USA	Alison Riske	150	6
CAN	Heidi El Tabakh	164	7
USA	Jessica Pegula	165	8

- ^{1} Rankings are as of September 10, 2012.

=== Other entrants ===
The following players received wildcards into the singles main draw:

- (United States) Jennifer Elie
- (United States) Irina Falconi
- (United States) Asia Muhammad
- (United States) Allie Will

The following players received entry from the qualifying draw:

- (United States) Jan Abaza
- (Bolivia) María Fernanda Álvarez Terán
- (Venezuela) Adriana Pérez
- (United States) Sachia Vickery

== Champions ==
=== Singles ===
- (United States) Maria Sanchez def. (United States) Lauren Davis, 6–1, 6–1

=== Doubles ===
- (United States) Asia Muhammad / (United States) Yasmin Schnack def. (United States) Irina Falconi / (United States) Maria Sanchez, 6–2, 1–6, [12–10]
