= 2013 Coleman Vision Tennis Championships – Doubles =

Doubles
- 2013 Coleman Vision Tennis Championships

Final
- Champions: (Greece) Eleni Daniilidou (United States) Coco Vandeweghe
- Runners-up: (United States) Melanie Oudin (United States) Taylor Townsend
- Score: 6–4, 7–6^{(7–2)}

Events
Singles	Doubles
← 2012 ·	Coleman Vision Tennis Championships	· 2014 →

Asia Muhammad and Yasmin Schnack were the defending champions, having won the event in 2012. Schnack decided not to participate while Muhammad played alongside Allie Will. They lost, however, in the semifinals.

Eleni Daniilidou and Coco Vandeweghe won the tournament, defeating Melanie Oudin and Taylor Townsend in the final, 6–4, 7–6^{(7–2)}.

== Seeds ==
1. (United States) Irina Falconi / (Georgia (country)) Anna Tatishvili (semifinals)
2. (United States) Asia Muhammad / (United States) Allie Will (semifinals)
3. (Greece) Eleni Daniilidou / (United States) Coco Vandeweghe (champions)
4. (United States) Jessica Pegula / (United States) Maria Sanchez (first round)

== Draw ==
=== Key ===
- Q = Qualifier
- WC = Wild card
- LL = Lucky loser
- Alt = Alternate
- SE = Special exempt
- PR = Protected ranking
- ITF = ITF entry
- JE = Junior exempt
- w/o = Walkover
- r = Retired
- d = Defaulted
- SR = Special ranking

First round
1	(United States) I Falconi (Georgia (country)) A Tatishvili	7	7^{7}
(United States) C-y Hsu (United States) N Melichar	5	6^{5}
(Brazil) MF Alves (Slovakia) L Wienerová	6	2	[10]
(Austria) T Paszek (United States) A Riske	3	6	[4]
4	(United States) J Pegula (United States) M Sanchez	6	4	[2]
(United States) M Oudin (United States) T Townsend	1	6	[10]
(Germany) K Barrois (Switzerland) A Sadiković	7	4	[12]
(United States) E Harman (United States) E Lumpkin	5	6	[10]
WC	(United States) M Harkins (United States) ZG Scandalis	2	5
(Paraguay) V Cepede Royg (Venezuela) A Pérez	6	7
(Norway) U Eikeri (South Africa) C Simmonds	2	0
3	(Greece) E Daniilidou (United States) C Vandeweghe	6	6
(United States) S Marand (United States) A Weinhold	6	6
(United States) J Abaza (United States) L Chirico	2	1
(United States) M Brengle (Australia) O Rogowska	3	4
2	(United States) A Muhammad (United States) A Will	6	6

Quarterfinals
1	(United States) I Falconi (Georgia (country)) A Tatishvili	7^{7}	6
(Brazil) MF Alves (Slovakia) L Wienerová	6^{3}	2
(United States) M Oudin (United States) T Townsend	6	6
(Germany) K Barrois (Switzerland) A Sadiković	3	3
(Paraguay) V Cepede Royg (Venezuela) A Pérez	4	3
3	(Greece) E Daniilidou (United States) C Vandeweghe	6	6
(United States) S Marand (United States) A Weinhold	4	6	[7]
2	(United States) A Muhammad (United States) A Will	6	2	[10]

Semifinals
1	(United States) I Falconi (Georgia (country)) A Tatishvili	6	2	[9]
(United States) M Oudin (United States) T Townsend	4	6	[11]
3	(Greece) E Daniilidou (United States) C Vandeweghe	6	6
2	(United States) A Muhammad (United States) A Will	1	2

Finals
(United States) M Oudin (United States) T Townsend	4	6^{2}
3	(Greece) E Daniilidou (United States) C Vandeweghe	6	7^{7}
