= 2014 Coleman Vision Tennis Championships =

- Date: 15–21 September
- Edition: 17th
- Category: ITF Women's Circuit
- Prize money: $75,000
- Surface: Hard
- Location: Albuquerque, New Mexico, United States

Champions

Singles
- (United States) Anna Tatishvili

Doubles
- (United States) Jan Abaza / (United States) Melanie Oudin
← 2013 ·	Coleman Vision Tennis Championships	· 2015 →

The 2014 Coleman Vision Tennis Championships was a professional tennis tournament played on outdoor hard courts. It was the seventeenth edition of the tournament which was part of the 2014 ITF Women's Circuit, offering a total of $75,000 in prize money. It took place in Albuquerque, New Mexico, United States, on 15–21 September 2014.

== Singles main draw entrants ==
=== Seeds ===
Country	Player	Rank^{1}	Seed
USA	Anna Tatishvili	104	1
USA	Madison Brengle	117	2
GBR	Johanna Konta	118	3
SRB	Jovana Jakšić	123	4
USA	Melanie Oudin	127	5
PAR	Verónica Cepede Royg	129	6
POR	Michelle Larcher de Brito	139	7
GBR	Naomi Broady	142	8

- ^{1} Rankings as of 8 September 2014

=== Other entrants ===
The following players received wildcards into the singles main draw:

- (United States) Lauren Embree
- (Czech Republic) Nicole Vaidišová
- (United States) Caitlin Whoriskey
- (United States) Allie Will

The following players received entry from the qualifying draw:

- (United States) Tornado Alicia Black
- (United States) Sofia Kenin
- (Slovenia) Petra Rampre
- (United States) Ashley Weinhold

The following player received an entry by a lucky loser spot:

- (United States) Tori Kinard

== Champions ==
=== Singles ===
- (United States) Anna Tatishvili def. (United States) Irina Falconi, 6–2, 6–4

=== Doubles ===
- (United States) Jan Abaza / (United States) Melanie Oudin def. (United States) Nicole Melichar / (United States) Allie Will, 6–2, 6–3
