= 2015 Coleman Vision Tennis Championships =

- Date: 21–27 September
- Edition: 18th
- Category: ITF Women's Circuit
- Prize money: $75,000
- Surface: Hard
- Location: Albuquerque, New Mexico, United States

Champions

Singles
- (Netherlands) Michaëlla Krajicek

Doubles
- (Brazil) Paula Cristina Gonçalves / (United States) Sanaz Marand
← 2014 ·	Coleman Vision Tennis Championships	· 2016 →

The 2015 Coleman Vision Tennis Championships was a professional tennis tournament played on outdoor hard courts. It was the eighteenth edition of the tournament and part of the 2015 ITF Women's Circuit, offering a total of $75,000 in prize money. It took place in Albuquerque, New Mexico, United States, on 21–27 September 2015.

== Singles main draw entrants ==
=== Seeds ===
Country	Player	Rank^{1}	Seed
BEL	An-Sophie Mestach	98	1
USA	Anna Tatishvili	102	2
USA	Louisa Chirico	122	3
USA	Nicole Gibbs	128	4
USA	Sachia Vickery	133	5
USA	Alexa Glatch	144	6
GBR	Naomi Broady	157	7
USA	Maria Sanchez	191	8

- ^{1} Rankings as of 14 September 2015

=== Other entrants ===
The following players received wildcards into the singles main draw:

- (United States) Jan Abaza
- (United States) Julia Boserup
- (United States) Victoria Duval
- (United States) Julia Jones

The following players received entry from the qualifying draw:

- (United States) Robin Anderson
- (Norway) Ulrikke Eikeri
- (Netherlands) Michaëlla Krajicek
- (Switzerland) Amra Sadiković

The following player received entry by a protected ranking:

- (United Kingdom) Lisa Whybourn

== Champions ==
=== Singles ===
- (Netherlands) Michaëlla Krajicek def. (United Kingdom) Naomi Broady, 6–7^{(2–7)}, 7–6^{(7–3)}, 7–5

=== Doubles ===
- (Brazil) Paula Cristina Gonçalves / (United States) Sanaz Marand def. (Austria) Tamira Paszek / (United States) Anna Tatishvili, 4–6, 6–2, [10–3]
