= 2017 Coleman Vision Tennis Championships =

- Date: 18–24 September
- Edition: 20th
- Category: ITF Women's Circuit
- Prize money: $80,000
- Surface: Hard
- Location: Albuquerque, United States

Champions

Singles
- (United States) Emina Bektas

Doubles
- (United Kingdom) Tara Moore / (Switzerland) Conny Perrin
← 2016 ·	Coleman Vision Tennis Championships	· 2018 →

The 2017 Coleman Vision Tennis Championships was a professional tennis tournament played on outdoor hard courts. It was the twentieth edition of the tournament and was part of the 2017 ITF Women's Circuit. It took place in Albuquerque, United States, on 18–24 September 2017.

== Singles main draw entrants ==
=== Seeds ===
Country	Player	Rank^{1}	Seed
SUI	Viktorija Golubic	106	1
USA	Sofia Kenin	112	2
USA	Kayla Day	140	3
AUT	Barbara Haas	167	4
CZE	Marie Bouzková	170	5
NZL	Marina Erakovic	174	6
SUI	Conny Perrin	194	7
BUL	Sesil Karatantcheva	224	8

- ^{1} Rankings as of 11 September 2017.

=== Other entrants ===
The following players received a wildcard into the singles main draw:

- (United States) Kayla Day
- (United States) Quinn Gleason
- (United States) Sanaz Marand

The following players received entry from the qualifying draw:

- (United States) Megan McCray
- (United States) Amanda Rodgers
- (United States) Sabrina Santamaria
- (Slovakia) Zuzana Zlochová

The following player received entry as a lucky loser:

- (Russia) Ksenia Laskutova

== Champions ==
=== Singles ===
- (United States) Emina Bektas def. (United States) Maria Sanchez, 6–4, 6–2

=== Doubles ===
- (United Kingdom) Tara Moore / (Switzerland) Conny Perrin def. (Switzerland) Viktorija Golubic / (Switzerland) Amra Sadiković, 6–3, 6–3
