= 2017 Coleman Vision Tennis Championships – Doubles =

Doubles
- 2017 Coleman Vision Tennis Championships

Final
- Champion: (United Kingdom) Tara Moore (Switzerland) Conny Perrin
- Runner-up: (Switzerland) Viktorija Golubic (Switzerland) Amra Sadiković
- Score: 6–3, 6–3

Events
Singles	Doubles
← 2016 ·	Coleman Vision Tennis Championships	· 2018 →

Michaëlla Krajicek and Maria Sanchez were the defending champions, but Krajicek chose not to participate. Sanchez chose to partner Jovana Jakšić, but they lost in the first round to Sabrina Santamaria and Carol Zhao.

Tara Moore and Conny Perrin won the title after defeating Viktorija Golubic and Amra Sadiković 6–3, 6–3 in the final.

== Seeds ==
1. (Switzerland) Viktorija Golubic / (Switzerland) Amra Sadiković (final)
2. (United States) Emina Bektas / (Chile) Alexa Guarachi (first round)
3. (Serbia) Jovana Jakšić / (United States) Maria Sanchez (first round)
4. (United States) Sanaz Marand / (United States) Ashley Weinhold (first round)

== Draw ==
=== Key ===
- Q = Qualifier
- WC = Wild card
- LL = Lucky loser
- Alt = Alternate
- SE = Special exempt
- PR = Protected ranking
- ITF = ITF entry
- JE = Junior exempt
- w/o = Walkover
- r = Retired
- d = Defaulted
- SR = Special ranking

First round
1	(Switzerland) V Golubic (Switzerland) A Sadiković	6	6
WC	(United States) A Parks (United States) S Schenck	4	4
WC	(United States) S Abrams (United States) A Rodgers	6	3	[4]
(United States) S Kenin (United States) I Neel	2	6	[10]
3	(Serbia) J Jakšić (United States) M Sanchez	0	6^{4}
(United States) S Santamaria (Canada) C Zhao	6	7^{7}
(United States) S Chang (United States) A Mueller	2	6	[10]
(United States) Q Gleason (United States) M Kobelt	6	3	[8]
(Norway) U Eikeri (Belgium) A-S Mestach	6	1	[10]
(New Zealand) M Erakovic (United Kingdom) L Robson	2	6	[6]
WC	(United States) C Corley (United States) I Corley	7^{7}	6^{6}	[10]
4	(United States) S Marand (United States) A Weinhold	6^{5}	7^{8}	[7]
(Russia) N Dzalamidze (Russia) A Gabueva	2	7^{13}	[6]
(United Kingdom) T Moore (Switzerland) C Perrin	6	6^{11}	[10]
(Italy) C Ferrando (Italy) C Rosatello	6	5	[10]
2	(United States) E Bektas (Chile) A Guarachi	1	7	[7]

Quarterfinals
1	(Switzerland) V Golubic (Switzerland) A Sadiković	7	5	[10]
(United States) S Kenin (United States) I Neel	5	7	[6]
(United States) S Santamaria (Canada) C Zhao	7	4	[8]
(United States) S Chang (United States) A Mueller	5	6	[10]
(Norway) U Eikeri (Belgium) A-S Mestach	6	6
WC	(United States) C Corley (United States) I Corley	3	2
(United Kingdom) T Moore (Switzerland) C Perrin	6	6
(Italy) C Ferrando (Italy) C Rosatello	3	1

Semifinals
1	(Switzerland) V Golubic (Switzerland) A Sadiković	6	7^{7}
(United States) S Chang (United States) A Mueller	3	6^{5}
(Norway) U Eikeri (Belgium) A-S Mestach	3	7^{7}	[7]
(United Kingdom) T Moore (Switzerland) C Perrin	6	6^{3}	[10]

Final
1	(Switzerland) V Golubic (Switzerland) A Sadiković	3	3
(United Kingdom) T Moore (Switzerland) C Perrin	6	6
