= 2016 Coleman Vision Tennis Championships =

- Date: 19–25 September
- Edition: 19th
- Category: ITF Women's Circuit
- Prize money: $75,000
- Surface: Hard
- Location: Albuquerque, United States

Champions

Singles
- (Luxembourg) Mandy Minella

Doubles
- (Netherlands) Michaëlla Krajicek / (United States) Maria Sanchez
← 2015 ·	Coleman Vision Tennis Championships	· 2017 →

The 2016 Coleman Vision Tennis Championships was a professional tennis tournament played on outdoor hard courts. It was the 19th edition of the tournament and part of the 2016 ITF Women's Circuit, offering a total of $75,000 in prize money. It took place in Albuquerque, United States, on 19–25 September 2016.

== Singles main draw entrants ==
=== Seeds ===
Country	Player	Rank^{1}	Seed
LUX	Mandy Minella	108	1
BEL	Alison Van Uytvanck	112	2
PAR	Verónica Cepede Royg	122	3
BEL	Elise Mertens	131	4
USA	Taylor Townsend	144	5
PAR	Montserrat González	150	6
BRA	Paula Cristina Gonçalves	158	7
NED	Michaëlla Krajicek	159	8

- ^{1} Rankings as of 12 September 2016.

=== Other entrants ===
The following player received a wildcard into the singles main draw:

- (United States) Usue Maitane Arconada
- (United States) Nicole Frenkel
- (United States) Chanelle Van Nguyen
- (Canada) Aleksandra Wozniak

The following players received entry from the qualifying draw:

- (Czech Republic) Marie Bouzková
- (United States) Caroline Dolehide
- (Germany) Anna Zaja
- (Mexico) Renata Zarazúa

The following player received entry by a special exempt:

- (United States) Melanie Oudin

The following player received entry by a protected ranking:

- (Portugal) Michelle Larcher de Brito

== Champions ==
=== Singles ===
- (Luxembourg) Mandy Minella def. (Paraguay) Verónica Cepede Royg, 6–4, 7–5

=== Doubles ===
- (Netherlands) Michaëlla Krajicek / (United States) Maria Sanchez def. (Belgium) Elise Mertens / (Luxembourg) Mandy Minella, 6–2, 6–4
