= 2011 Coleman Vision Tennis Championships – Doubles =

Doubles
- 2011 Coleman Vision Tennis Championships

Final
- Champions: (United States) Alexa Glatch (United States) Asia Muhammad
- Runners-up: (United States) Grace Min (United States) Melanie Oudin
- Score: 4–6, 6–3, [10–2]

Events
Singles	Doubles
← 2010 ·	Coleman Vision Tennis Championships	· 2012 →

Lindsay Lee-Waters and Megan Moulton-Levy were the defending champions, but lost in the Quarterfinals to Macall Harkins and Ahsha Rolle.
Alexa Glatch and Asia Muhammad won the title by defeating Grace Min and Melanie Oudin in the final 4–6, 6–3, [10–2].

== Seeds ==
1. (United States) Lindsay Lee-Waters / (United States) Megan Moulton-Levy (quarterfinals)
2. (France) Irena Pavlovic / (Germany) Kathrin Wörle (semifinals)
3. (United States) Jamie Hampton / (Georgia (country)) Anna Tatishvili (quarterfinals)
4. (Russia) Elena Bovina / (France) Julie Coin (first round)

== Draw ==
=== Key ===
- Q = Qualifier
- WC = Wild card
- LL = Lucky loser
- Alt = Alternate
- SE = Special exempt
- PR = Protected ranking
- ITF = ITF entry
- JE = Junior exempt
- w/o = Walkover
- r = Retired
- d = Defaulted
- SR = Special ranking

=== Draw ===
First round
1	(United States) L Lee-Waters (United States) M Moulton-Levy	6	7
(Switzerland) A Sadiković (Brazil) R Vaisemberg	4	5
(United States) J Boserup (Denmark) M Ejdesgaard	3	4
(United States) M Harkins (United States) A Rolle	6	6
4	(Russia) E Bovina (France) J Coin	5	3
WC	(Slovenia) P Rampre (Croatia) A Tomljanović	7	6
(United States) A Glatch (United States) A Muhammad	6	6
(United States) M Brengle (Croatia) M Lučić	2	1
WC	(United States) G Min (United States) M Oudin	6	7^{7}
(United States) Y Schnack (United States) A Weinhold	4	6^{4}
WC	(United States) L Davis (United States) N Melichar	3	4
3	(United States) J Hampton (Georgia (country)) A Tatishvili	6	6
(United States) B Augustine (United States) W Jones	6	7^{7}
SR	(Hungary) M Czink (United States) M Washington	4	6^{4}
(Canada) G Dabrowski (United States) A Fink	4	6^{4}
2	(France) I Pavlovic (Germany) K Wörle	6	7^{7}

Quarterfinals
1	(United States) L Lee-Waters (United States) M Moulton-Levy	6^{5}	6	[7]
(United States) M Harkins (United States) A Rolle	7^{7}	3	[10]
WC	(Slovenia) P Rampre (Croatia) A Tomljanović	6^{1}	7	[5]
(United States) A Glatch (United States) A Muhammad	7^{7}	5	[10]
(United States) G Min (United States) M Oudin	6	6
3	(United States) J Hampton (Georgia (country)) A Tatishvili	3	2
(United States) B Augustine (United States) W Jones	4	3
2	(France) I Pavlovic (Germany) K Wörle	6	6

Semifinals
(United States) M Harkins (United States) A Rolle	3	6	[6]
(United States) A Glatch (United States) A Muhammad	6	2	[10]
(United States) G Min (United States) M Oudin	6	6
2	(France) I Pavlovic (Germany) K Wörle	3	2

Finals
(United States) A Glatch (United States) A Muhammad	4	6	[10]
(United States) G Min (United States) M Oudin	6	3	[2]
