= 2017 Coleman Vision Tennis Championships – Singles =

Singles
- 2017 Coleman Vision Tennis Championships

Final
- Champion: (United States) Emina Bektas
- Runner-up: (United States) Maria Sanchez
- Score: 6–4, 6–2

Events
Singles	Doubles
← 2016 ·	Coleman Vision Tennis Championships	· 2018 →

Mandy Minella was the defending champion, but she did not participate due to pregnancy.

Emina Bektas won the title, defeating Maria Sanchez in straight sets in the final.

== Seeds ==
1. (Switzerland) Viktorija Golubic (first round)
2. (United States) Sofia Kenin (first round)
3. (United States) Kayla Day (first round)
4. (Austria) Barbara Haas (first round)
5. (Czech Republic) Marie Bouzková (first round)
6. (New Zealand) Marina Erakovic (second round)
7. (Switzerland) Conny Perrin (first round)
8. (Bulgaria) Sesil Karatantcheva (quarterfinals)

== Draw ==
=== Key ===
- Q = Qualifier
- WC = Wild card
- LL = Lucky loser
- Alt = Alternate
- SE = Special exempt
- PR = Protected ranking
- ITF = ITF entry
- JE = Junior exempt
- w/o = Walkover
- r = Retired
- d = Defaulted
- SR = Special ranking

=== Finals ===
Semifinals
(United States) Maria Sanchez	1	6	6
(United States) Sophie Chang	6	3	2
(France) Shérazad Reix	3	6^{3}
(United States) Emina Bektas	6	7^{7}

Final
(United States) Maria Sanchez	4	2
(United States) Emina Bektas	6	6

=== Top half ===
First round
1	(Switzerland) V Golubic	6	4	6^{9}
(United States) M Sanchez	3	6	7^{11}
(Italy) C Ferrando	6	7
(Canada) A Wozniak	4	5
WC	(United States) S Marand	6	6
(South Africa) C Simmonds	4	4
(United Kingdom) L Robson	6	3	3
6	(New Zealand) M Erakovic	3	6	6
4	(Austria) B Haas	4	6	2
(United States) S Chang	6	4	6
(Italy) C Rosatello	6	3	3
WC	(United States) Q Gleason	1	6	6
(Russia) N Dzalamidze	2	0
(Serbia) J Jakšić	6	6
(Switzerland) A Sadiković	4	7^{7}	6
7	(Switzerland) C Perrin	6	6^{3}	4

Second round
(United States) M Sanchez	6^{5}	6	6
(Italy) C Ferrando	7^{7}	2	3
WC	(United States) S Marand	6	3	6
6	(New Zealand) M Erakovic	4	6	1
(United States) S Chang	6	6
WC	(United States) Q Gleason	4	3
(Serbia) J Jakšić	6	6
(Switzerland) A Sadiković	4	2

Quarterfinals
(United States) M Sanchez	6	7^{7}
WC	(United States) S Marand	1	6^{3}
(United States) S Chang	6	6
(Serbia) J Jakšić	3	3

Semifinals
(United States) M Sanchez	1	6	6
(United States) S Chang	6	3	2

=== Bottom half ===
First round
5	(Czech Republic) M Bouzková	6^{2}	3
(United Kingdom) T Moore	7^{7}	6
LL	(Russia) K Laskutova	6	1	3
Q	(United States) A Rodgers	4	6	6
(United States) A Kratzer	3	2
(France) S Reix	6	6
(Canada) C Zhao	4	6	6
3/WC	(United States) K Day	6	1	1
8	(Bulgaria) S Karatantcheva	6	6
(Norway) U Eikeri	1	2
(United States) C Liu	5	6	2
Q	(United States) M McCray	7	3	6
Q	(Slovakia) Z Zlochová	6	0	0^{r}
Q	(United States) S Santamaria	4	6	1
(United States) E Bektas	6	7^{7}
2	(United States) S Kenin	4	6^{5}

Second round
(United Kingdom) T Moore	3	7	6
Q	(United States) A Rodgers	6	5	2
(France) S Reix	4	6	7^{7}
(Canada) C Zhao	6	4	6^{3}
8	(Bulgaria) S Karatantcheva	6	6
Q	(United States) M McCray	4	0
Q	(United States) S Santamaria	6	4	1
(United States) E Bektas	4	6	6

Quarterfinals
(United Kingdom) T Moore	5	5
(France) S Reix	7	7
8	(Bulgaria) S Karatantcheva	4	7^{7}	4
(United States) E Bektas	6	6^{4}	6

Semifinals
(France) S Reix	3	6^{3}
(United States) E Bektas	6	7^{7}
