= 2014 Coleman Vision Tennis Championships – Singles =

Singles
- 2014 Coleman Vision Tennis Championships

Final
- Champion: (United States) Anna Tatishvili
- Runner-up: (United States) Irina Falconi
- Score: 6–2, 6–4

Events
Singles	Doubles
← 2013 ·	Coleman Vision Tennis Championships	· 2015 →

Shelby Rogers was the defending champion, having won the event in 2013, but chose not to participate.

Anna Tatishvili won the all-American final, defeating Irina Falconi 6–2, 6–4.

== Seeds ==
1. (United States) Anna Tatishvili (champion)
2. (United States) Madison Brengle (quarterfinals)
3. (United Kingdom) Johanna Konta (semifinals)
4. (Serbia) Jovana Jakšić (first round)
5. (United States) Melanie Oudin (second round)
6. (Paraguay) Verónica Cepede Royg (first round)
7. (Portugal) Michelle Larcher de Brito (second round)
8. (United Kingdom) Naomi Broady (first round)

== Main draw ==
=== Key ===
- Q = Qualifier
- WC = Wild card
- LL = Lucky loser
- Alt = Alternate
- SE = Special exempt
- PR = Protected ranking
- ITF = ITF entry
- JE = Junior exempt
- w/o = Walkover
- r = Retired
- d = Defaulted
- SR = Special ranking

=== Finals ===
Semifinals
1	(United States) Anna Tatishvili	4	6	7^{7}
3	(United Kingdom) Johanna Konta	6	3	6^{3}
(United States) Irina Falconi	6	7^{7}
(United States) Louisa Chirico	3	6^{5}

Final
1	(United States) Anna Tatishvili	6	6
(United States) Irina Falconi	2	4

=== Top half ===
First round
1	(United States) A Tatishvili	7	6
(United Kingdom) T Moore	5	2
Q	(United States) TA Black	6	4	6
(Argentina) M Irigoyen	1	6	2
WC	(United States) L Embree	3	5
(United States) J Boserup	6	7
(Paraguay) M González	4	7^{7}	6^{5}
5	(United States) M Oudin	6	6^{5}	7^{7}
3	(United Kingdom) J Konta	6	6
(United States) J Cohen	2	1
(Kazakhstan) S Karatantcheva	3	4
WC	(Czech Republic) N Vaidišová	6	6
WC	(United States) A Will	7	6^{5}	6^{5}
WC	(United States) C Whoriskey	5	7^{7}	7^{7}
(Colombia) M Duque	2	6	4
7	(Portugal) M Larcher de Brito	6	4	6

Second round
1	(United States) A Tatishvili	6	6
Q	(United States) TA Black	2	3
(United States) J Boserup	6	6
5	(United States) M Oudin	2	2
3	(United Kingdom) J Konta	1	6	6
WC	(Czech Republic) N Vaidišová	6	1	4
WC	(United States) C Whoriskey	7	6
7	(Portugal) M Larcher de Brito	5	1

Quarterfinals
1	(United States) A Tatishvili	7^{7}	7^{8}
(United States) J Boserup	6^{1}	6^{6}
3	(United Kingdom) J Konta	7^{7}	6
WC	(United States) C Whoriskey	6^{3}	2

Semifinals
1	(United States) A Tatishvili	4	6	7^{7}
3	(United Kingdom) J Konta	6	3	6^{3}

=== Bottom half ===
First round
8	(United Kingdom) N Broady	3	6^{3}
(United States) I Falconi	6	7^{7}
(Italy) G Barbieri	6	4	6
(Poland) U Radwańska	3	6	1
Q	(United States) S Kenin	3	3
Q	(Slovenia) P Rampre	6	6
(Poland) P Kania	1	7^{7}	7^{7}
4	(Serbia) J Jakšić	6	6^{5}	6^{1}
6	(Paraguay) V Cepede Royg	6	5	6^{5}
(United States) L Chirico	1	7	7^{7}
(France) A Hesse	6	0	6
LL	(United States) T Kinard	2	6	3
(Canada) G Dabrowski	3	1
Q	(United States) A Weinhold	6	6
(Czech Republic) B Krejčíková	1	2
2	(United States) M Brengle	6	6

Second round
(United States) I Falconi	6	6
(Italy) G Barbieri	4	1
Q	(Slovenia) P Rampre	5	6	6
(Poland) P Kania	7	0	1
(United States) L Chirico	4	6	6
(France) A Hesse	6	2	3
Q	(United States) A Weinhold	2	6	0
2	(United States) M Brengle	6	4	6

Quarterfinals
(United States) I Falconi	6	6
Q	(Slovenia) P Rampre	1	1
(United States) L Chirico	6	1	6
2	(United States) M Brengle	4	6	4

Semifinals
(United States) I Falconi	6	7^{7}
(United States) L Chirico	3	6^{5}
