= 2016 Coleman Vision Tennis Championships – Doubles =

Doubles
- 2016 Coleman Vision Tennis Championships

Final
- Champions: (Netherlands) Michaëlla Krajicek (United States) Maria Sanchez
- Runners-up: (Belgium) Elise Mertens (Luxembourg) Mandy Minella
- Score: 6–2, 6–4

Events
Singles	Doubles
← 2015 ·	Coleman Vision Tennis Championships	· 2017 →

Paula Cristina Gonçalves and Sanaz Marand were the defending champions, but chose not to participate together. Gonçalves partnered Verónica Cepede Royg, while Marand partnered Melanie Oudin, but both pairs lost in the first round.

Michaëlla Krajicek and Maria Sanchez won the title, defeating Elise Mertens and Mandy Minella in the final, 6–2, 6–4.

== Seeds ==
1. (Belgium) Ysaline Bonaventure / (Poland) Paula Kania (first round)
2. (Belgium) Elise Mertens / (Luxembourg) Mandy Minella (final)
3. (Netherlands) Michaëlla Krajicek / (United States) Maria Sanchez (champions)
4. (Paraguay) Verónica Cepede Royg / (Brazil) Paula Cristina Gonçalves (first round)

== Draw ==
=== Key ===
- Q = Qualifier
- WC = Wild card
- LL = Lucky loser
- Alt = Alternate
- SE = Special exempt
- PR = Protected ranking
- ITF = ITF entry
- JE = Junior exempt
- w/o = Walkover
- r = Retired
- d = Defaulted
- SR = Special ranking

First round
1	(Belgium) Y Bonaventure (Poland) P Kania	6^{11}	7	[9]
WC	(United States) K Ahn (United States) C Van Nguyen	7^{13}	5	[11]
(United States) J Pegula (United States) T Townsend	5	6	[10]
(Croatia) A Vrljić (Germany) A Zaja	7	4	[5]
3	(Netherlands) M Krajicek (United States) M Sanchez	7^{7}	3	[10]
(Chinese Taipei) C-y Hsu (South Africa) C Simmonds	6^{5}	6	[6]
(France) S Foretz (France) A Hesse	2	4
WC	(United States) B Pera (United States) S Santamaria	6	6
(United States) S Marand (United States) M Oudin	2	6	[4]
(France) A Lim (Russia) V Solovyeva	6	3	[10]
(United States) A Weinhold (United States) C Whoriskey	7	3	[10]
4	(Paraguay) V Cepede Royg (Brazil) PC Gonçalves	5	6	[7]
(United States) J Loeb (Canada) C Zhao	6	0	[12]
(Paraguay) M González (Mexico) AS Sánchez	3	6	[10]
(Bosnia and Herzegovina) E Burgić Bucko (Mexico) R Zarazúa	3	0
2	(Belgium) E Mertens (Luxembourg) M Minella	6	6

Quarterfinals
WC	(United States) K Ahn (United States) C Van Nguyen	7^{7}	6
(United States) J Pegula (United States) T Townsend	6^{2}	2
3	(Netherlands) M Krajicek (United States) M Sanchez	6	6
WC	(United States) B Pera (United States) S Santamaria	4	3
(France) A Lim (Russia) V Solovyeva	6	3	[10]
(United States) A Weinhold (United States) C Whoriskey	3	6	[7]
(United States) J Loeb (Canada) C Zhao	6^{4}	4
2	(Belgium) E Mertens (Luxembourg) M Minella	7^{7}	6

Semifinals
WC	(United States) K Ahn (United States) C Van Nguyen	4	6	[6]
3	(Netherlands) M Krajicek (United States) M Sanchez	6	3	[10]
(France) A Lim (Russia) V Solovyeva	2	3
2	(Belgium) E Mertens (Luxembourg) M Minella	6	6

Final
3	(Netherlands) M Krajicek (United States) M Sanchez	6	6
2	(Belgium) E Mertens (Luxembourg) M Minella	2	4
