= 2022 BNP Paribas Open – Women's doubles =

Women's doubles
- 2022 BNP Paribas Open

Final
- Champions: (China) Xu Yifan (China) Yang Zhaoxuan
- Runners-up: (United States) Asia Muhammad (Japan) Ena Shibahara
- Score: 7–5, 7–6^{(7–4)}

Details
- Draw: 32 (3 WC)
- Seeds: 8

Events
Singles	men	women
Doubles	men	women
← 2021 ·	BNP Paribas Open	· 2023 →

Xu Yifan and Yang Zhaoxuan defeated Asia Muhammad and Ena Shibahara in the final, 7–5, 7–6^{(7–4)} to win the women's doubles tennis title at the 2022 Indian Wells Masters. They became the first all-Chinese team to win a WTA 1000-level title.

Hsieh Su-wei and Elise Mertens were the defending champions. Hsieh chose not to compete. Mertens partnered with Veronika Kudermetova, but lost in the first round to Eri Hozumi and Makoto Ninomiya.

== Seeds ==
1. Veronika Kudermetova / (Belgium) Elise Mertens (first round)
2. (Australia) Samantha Stosur / (China) Zhang Shuai (first round)
3. (United States) Coco Gauff / (United States) Caty McNally (quarterfinals)
4. (Croatia) Darija Jurak Schreiber / (Slovenia) Andreja Klepač (first round)
5. (Canada) Gabriela Dabrowski / (Mexico) Giuliana Olmos (semifinals)
6. (United States) Desirae Krawczyk / (Netherlands) Demi Schuurs (second round)
7. (United States) Asia Muhammad / (Japan) Ena Shibahara (final)
8. (United States) Caroline Dolehide / (Australia) Storm Sanders (quarterfinals)

== Draw ==
=== Key ===
- Q = Qualifier
- WC = Wild card
- LL = Lucky loser
- Alt = Alternate
- ITF = ITF entry
- PR = Protected ranking
- SR = Special ranking
- SE = Special exempt
- JE = Junior exempt
- JR = Junior Accelerator Programme entrant
- CO = College Accelerator Programme entrant
- NG = Next Gen Accelerator Program entrant
- w/o = Walkover
- r = Retired
- d = Defaulted

=== Finals ===
Semifinals
5	(Canada) Gabriela Dabrowski (Mexico) Giuliana Olmos	6^{6}	6	[5]
7	(United States) Asia Muhammad (Japan) Ena Shibahara	7^{8}	3	[10]
(China) Xu Yifan (China) Yang Zhaoxuan	7	6
(France) Alizé Cornet (Canada) Leylah Fernandez	5	1

Final
7	(United States) Asia Muhammad (Japan) Ena Shibahara	5	6^{4}
(China) Xu Yifan (China) Yang Zhaoxuan	7	7^{7}

=== Top half ===
First round
1	V Kudermetova (Belgium) E Mertens	3	3
(Japan) E Hozumi (Japan) M Ninomiya	6	6
WC	(Ukraine) D Yastremska (Ukraine) I Yastremska	1	1
(Romania) I-C Begu (Romania) M Niculescu	6	6
SR	(Belgium) K Flipkens (India) S Mirza	6	3	[10]
(Japan) S Aoyama (Serbia) A Krunić	3	6	[7]
SR	(Slovakia) T Mihalíková (Czech Republic) K Peschke	3	2
5	(Canada) G Dabrowski (Mexico) G Olmos	6	6
3	(United States) C Gauff (United States) C McNally	6	6
WC	(United States) L Davis (United States) C McHale	3	3
(Greece) M Sakkari (Australia) A Tomljanović	4	6	[10]
(Croatia) P Martić (United States) S Rogers	6	4	[2]
(Estonia) A Kontaveit (Kazakhstan) E Rybakina	6^{9}	2
WC	(United States) S Kenin (United States) A Riske	7^{11}	6
(Czech Republic) K Siniaková (Denmark) C Tauson	3	6^{4}
7	(United States) A Muhammad (Japan) E Shibahara	6	7^{7}

Second round
(Japan) E Hozumi (Japan) M Ninomiya	4	5
(Romania) I-C Begu (Romania) M Niculescu	6	7
SR	(Belgium) K Flipkens (India) S Mirza	4	6	[3]
5	(Canada) G Dabrowski (Mexico) G Olmos	6	4	[10]
3	(United States) C Gauff (United States) C McNally	6	6
(Greece) M Sakkari (Australia) A Tomljanović	4	1
WC	(United States) S Kenin (United States) A Riske	6	4	[1]
7	(United States) A Muhammad (Japan) E Shibahara	1	6	[10]

Quarterfinals
(Romania) I-C Begu (Romania) M Niculescu	2	6	[7]
5	(Canada) G Dabrowski (Mexico) G Olmos	6	2	[10]
3	(United States) C Gauff (United States) C McNally	2	6	[7]
7	(United States) A Muhammad (Japan) E Shibahara	6	1	[10]

Semifinals
5	(Canada) G Dabrowski (Mexico) G Olmos	6^{6}	6	[5]
7	(United States) A Muhammad (Japan) E Shibahara	7^{8}	3	[10]

=== Bottom half ===
First round
8	(United States) C Dolehide (Australia) S Sanders	6	4	[10]
(Ukraine) L Kichenok (Latvia) J Ostapenko	1	6	[7]
(United States) M Keys (United States) J Pegula	6	6
N Dzalamidze (Georgia (country)) E Gorgodze	2	2
(China) Y Xu (China) Z Yang	6	2	[10]
(Ukraine) N Kichenok (Romania) R Olaru	3	6	[8]
(Chinese Taipei) H-c Chan (Poland) M Linette	6	2	[12]
4	(Croatia) D Jurak Schreiber (Slovenia) A Klepač	3	6	[10]
6	(United States) D Krawczyk (Netherlands) D Schuurs	4	6	[10]
(Chile) A Guarachi (United States) S Santamaria	6	2	[8]
(Norway) U Eikeri (New Zealand) E Routliffe	6	0	[7]
(Czech Republic) M Bouzková (Czech Republic) L Hradecká	4	6	[10]
(Kazakhstan) A Danilina (Brazil) B Haddad Maia	6	6^{5}	[8]
SR	(Germany) L Siegemund; V Zvonareva	2	7^{7}	[10]
(France) A Cornet (Canada) L Fernandez	1	7^{9}	[10]
2	(Australia) S Stosur (China) S Zhang	6	6^{7}	[8]

Second round
8	(United States) C Dolehide (Australia) S Sanders	3	7^{7}	[10]
(United States) M Keys (United States) J Pegula	6	6^{4}	[4]
(China) Y Xu (China) Z Yang	6	6
(Chinese Taipei) H-c Chan (Poland) M Linette	1	3
6	(United States) D Krawczyk (Netherlands) D Schuurs	4	4
(Czech Republic) M Bouzková (Czech Republic) L Hradecká	6	6
SR	(Germany) L Siegemund; V Zvonareva	2	6	[2]
(France) A Cornet (Canada) L Fernandez	6	3	[10]

Quarterfinals
8	(United States) C Dolehide (Australia) S Sanders	6	6^{4}	[9]
(China) Y Xu (China) Z Yang	1	7^{7}	[11]
(Czech Republic) M Bouzková (Czech Republic) L Hradecká
(France) A Cornet (Canada) L Fernandez	w/o

Semifinals
(China) Y Xu (China) Z Yang	7	6
(France) A Cornet (Canada) L Fernandez	5	1

== Seeded teams ==
The following are the seeded teams. Seedings are based on WTA rankings as of February 28, 2022.

Country	Player	Country	Player	Rank	Seed
	Veronika Kudermetova	BEL	Elise Mertens	9	1
AUS	Samantha Stosur	CHN	Zhang Shuai	19	2
USA	Coco Gauff	USA	Caty McNally	23	3
CRO	Darija Jurak Schreiber	SLO	Andreja Klepač	29	4
CAN	Gabriela Dabrowski	MEX	Giuliana Olmos	31	5
USA	Desirae Krawczyk	NED	Demi Schuurs	37	6
USA	Asia Muhammad	JPN	Ena Shibahara	40	7
USA	Caroline Dolehide	AUS	Storm Sanders	41	8

== Other entry information ==
=== Wildcards ===
- (United States) Lauren Davis / (United States) Christina McHale
- (United States) Sofia Kenin / (United States) Alison Riske
- (Ukraine) Dayana Yastremska / (Ukraine) Ivanna Yastremska

=== Special ranking ===
- (Belgium) Kirsten Flipkens / (India) Sania Mirza
- (Slovakia) Tereza Mihalíková / (Czech Republic) Květa Peschke
- (Germany) Laura Siegemund / Vera Zvonareva

=== Withdrawals ===
- (Chile) Alexa Guarachi / (United States) Nicole Melichar-Martinez → replaced by (Chile) Alexa Guarachi / (United States) Sabrina Santamaria
- (Czech Republic) Barbora Krejčíková / (Czech Republic) Kateřina Siniaková → replaced by (Czech Republic) Kateřina Siniaková / (Denmark) Clara Tauson
- (Poland) Magda Linette / (United States) Bernarda Pera → replaced by (Chinese Taipei) Chan Hao-ching / (Poland) Magda Linette
