= 2016 Coleman Vision Tennis Championships – Singles =

Singles
- 2016 Coleman Vision Tennis Championships

Final
- Champion: (Luxembourg) Mandy Minella
- Runner-up: (Paraguay) Verónica Cepede Royg
- Score: 6–4, 7–5

Events
Singles	Doubles
← 2015 ·	Coleman Vision Tennis Championships	· 2017 →

Michaëlla Krajicek was the defending champion, but lost in the quarterfinals to Alison Van Uytvanck.

Mandy Minella won the title, defeating Verónica Cepede Royg in the final, 6–4, 7–5.

== Seeds ==
1. (Luxembourg) Mandy Minella (champion)
2. (Belgium) Alison Van Uytvanck (semifinals)
3. (Paraguay) Verónica Cepede Royg (final)
4. (Belgium) Elise Mertens (first round)
5. (United States) Taylor Townsend (second round)
6. (Paraguay) Montserrat González (quarterfinals)
7. (Brazil) Paula Cristina Gonçalves (second round)
8. (Netherlands) Michaëlla Krajicek (quarterfinals)

== Main draw ==
=== Key ===
- Q = Qualifier
- WC = Wild card
- LL = Lucky loser
- Alt = Alternate
- SE = Special exempt
- PR = Protected ranking
- ITF = ITF entry
- JE = Junior exempt
- w/o = Walkover
- r = Retired
- d = Defaulted
- SR = Special ranking

=== Finals ===
Semifinals
1	(Luxembourg) Mandy Minella	6	6^{3}	6
WC	(Canada) Aleksandra Wozniak	1	7^{7}	0
3	(Paraguay) Verónica Cepede Royg	6^{3}	6	6
2	(Belgium) Alison Van Uytvanck	7^{7}	1	4

Final
1	(Luxembourg) Mandy Minella	6	7
3	(Paraguay) Verónica Cepede Royg	4	5

=== Top half ===
First round
1	(Luxembourg) M Minella	6	7
(Belgium) Y Bonaventure	3	5
(Czech Republic) B Štefková	6	2	6
(United States) J Loeb	0	6	4
Q	(Czech Republic) M Bouzková	6	6
(Bulgaria) S Karatantcheva	0	2
(France) A Lim	4	4
5	(United States) T Townsend	6	6
4	(Belgium) E Mertens	3	6^{4}
Q	(Germany) A Zaja	6	7^{7}
WC	(United States) N Frenkel	1	2
(Poland) P Kania	6	6
SE	(United States) M Oudin	3	1
WC	(Canada) A Wozniak	6	6
PR	(Portugal) M Larcher de Brito	2	5
7	(Brazil) PC Gonçalves	6	7

Second round
1	(Luxembourg) M Minella	6	6
(Czech Republic) B Štefková	3	3
Q	(Czech Republic) M Bouzková	6	3	7
5	(United States) T Townsend	2	6	5
Q	(Germany) A Zaja	3	4
(Poland) P Kania	6	6
WC	(Canada) A Wozniak	6	3	7
7	(Brazil) PC Gonçalves	0	6	5

Quarterfinals
1	(Luxembourg) M Minella	6	6
Q	(Czech Republic) M Bouzková	1	4
(Poland) P Kania	0	6^{2}
WC	(Canada) A Wozniak	6	7^{7}

Semifinals
1	(Luxembourg) M Minella	6	6^{3}	6
WC	(Canada) A Wozniak	1	7^{7}	0

=== Bottom half ===
First round
6	(Paraguay) M González	6	6
WC	(United States) C Van Nguyen	4	4
(United States) S Vickery	4	6	6
(France) A Hesse	6	4	4
Q	(United States) C Dolehide	6	7^{7}
(Argentina) N Podoroska	3	6^{4}
(Japan) M Hibi	3	5
3	(Paraguay) V Cepede Royg	6	7
8	(Netherlands) M Krajicek	6	6
WC	(United States) UM Arconada	3	0
Q	(Mexico) R Zarazúa	6	3	6
(Serbia) J Jakšić	3	6	3
(France) S Reix	7^{7}	6
(United States) J Pegula	6^{3}	4
(United States) K Ahn	6^{5}	4
2	(Belgium) A Van Uytvanck	7^{7}	6

Second round
6	(Paraguay) M González	6	4	7
(United States) S Vickery	4	6	5
Q	(United States) C Dolehide	6	2	3
3	(Paraguay) V Cepede Royg	3	6	6
8	(Netherlands) M Krajicek	6	6
Q	(Mexico) R Zarazúa	2	3
(France) S Reix	5	4
2	(Belgium) A Van Uytvanck	7	6

Quarterfinals
6	(Paraguay) M González	3	2
3	(Paraguay) V Cepede Royg	6	6
8	(Netherlands) M Krajicek	2	4
2	(Belgium) A Van Uytvanck	6	6

Semifinals
3	(Paraguay) V Cepede Royg	6^{3}	6	6
2	(Belgium) A Van Uytvanck	7^{7}	1	4
