= 2021 BNP Paribas Open – Women's doubles =

Tennis tournament

Women's doubles
- 2021 BNP Paribas Open

Final
- Champions: (Chinese Taipei) Hsieh Su-wei (Belgium) Elise Mertens
- Runners-up: (Russia) Veronika Kudermetova (Kazakhstan) Elena Rybakina
- Score: 7–6^{(7–1)}, 6–3

Events
| Singles | men | women |
| Doubles | men | women |
| ← 2019 · | BNP Paribas Open | · 2022 → |

Hsieh Su-wei and Elise Mertens defeated Veronika Kudermetova and Elena Rybakina in the final, 7–6^{(7–1)}, 6–3, to win the women's doubles tennis title at the 2021 Indian Wells Masters. It was Hsieh's third title at the tournament and her 30th career doubles title overall. Mertens successfully defended her title to win for a second time after she first won the tournament in 2019 with Aryna Sabalenka, who chose not to defend her title.

Mertens and Barbora Krejčíková were in contention for the world No. 1 doubles ranking at the beginning of the tournament. By winning the title, Mertens usurped Krejčíková for the top ranking.

== Seeds ==
1. (Czech Republic) Barbora Krejčíková / (Czech Republic) Kateřina Siniaková (quarterfinals)
2. (Chinese Taipei) Hsieh Su-wei / (Belgium) Elise Mertens (champions)
3. (Japan) Shuko Aoyama / (Japan) Ena Shibahara (semifinals)
4. (Chile) Alexa Guarachi / (United States) Desirae Krawczyk (second round)
5. (United States) Nicole Melichar-Martinez / (Netherlands) Demi Schuurs (second round)
6. (United States) Hayley Carter / (Canada) Gabriela Dabrowski (second round)
7. (Croatia) Darija Jurak / (Slovenia) Andreja Klepač (first round)
8. (Canada) Sharon Fichman / (Mexico) Giuliana Olmos (second round)

== Draw ==
=== Key ===
- Q = Qualifier
- WC = Wild card
- LL = Lucky loser
- Alt = Alternate
- SE = Special exempt
- PR = Protected ranking
- ITF = ITF entry
- JE = Junior exempt
- w/o = Walkover
- r = Retired
- d = Defaulted
- SR = Special ranking

=== Finals ===
Semifinals
(Ukraine) Lyudmyla Kichenok (Latvia) Jeļena Ostapenko | 4 | 3
(Russia) Veronika Kudermetova (Kazakhstan) Elena Rybakina | 6 | 6
3 | (Japan) Shuko Aoyama (Japan) Ena Shibahara | 2 | 0
2 | (Chinese Taipei) Hsieh Su-wei (Belgium) Elise Mertens | 6 | 6

Final
(Russia) Veronika Kudermetova (Kazakhstan) Elena Rybakina | 6^{1} | 3
2 | (Chinese Taipei) Hsieh Su-wei (Belgium) Elise Mertens | 7^{7} | 6

=== Top half ===
First round
1 | (Czech Republic) B Krejčíková (Czech Republic) K Siniaková | 6^{6} | 6 | [10]
(Switzerland) V Golubic (Switzerland) J Teichmann | 7^{8} | 2 | [2]
(Norway) U Eikeri (Belarus) A Sasnovich | 6 | 6
WC | (United States) R Brantmeier (United States) K Scott | 4 | 1
(Ukraine) L Kichenok (Latvia) J Ostapenko | 6 | 6
(United States) S Rogers (Australia) A Tomljanović | 3 | 3
(United States) K Christian (New Zealand) E Routliffe | 4 | 4
6 | (United States) H Carter (Canada) G Dabrowski | 6 | 6
4 | (Chile) A Guarachi (United States) D Krawczyk | 3 | 6 | [10]
PR | (United Kingdom) H Watson (China) S Zheng | 6 | 3 | [8]
PR | (Australia) An Rodionova (Australia) Ar Rodionova | 3 | 6 | [6]
(Russia) V Kudermetova (Kazakhstan) E Rybakina | 6 | 3 | [10]
(Czech Republic) M Bouzková (Czech Republic) L Hradecká | 6 | 3 | [10]
PR | (Japan) N Hibino (Poland) A Rosolska | 2 | 6 | [6]
WC | (Romania) S Halep (Romania) E-G Ruse | 7 | 7^{9}
7 | (Croatia) D Jurak (Slovenia) A Klepač | 5 | 6^{7}

Second round
1 | (Czech Republic) B Krejčíková (Czech Republic) K Siniaková | 6 | 6
(Norway) U Eikeri (Belarus) A Sasnovich | 3 | 2
(Ukraine) L Kichenok (Latvia) J Ostapenko | 6 | 6
6 | (United States) H Carter (Canada) G Dabrowski | 4 | 2
4 | (Chile) A Guarachi (United States) D Krawczyk | 3 | 7^{7} | [0]
(Russia) V Kudermetova (Kazakhstan) E Rybakina | 6 | 6^{2} | [10]
(Czech Republic) M Bouzková (Czech Republic) L Hradecká | 6 | 5 | [10]
WC | (Romania) S Halep (Romania) E-G Ruse | 2 | 7 | [5]

Quarterfinals
1 | (Czech Republic) B Krejčíková (Czech Republic) K Siniaková | 6 | 4 | [8]
(Ukraine) L Kichenok (Latvia) J Ostapenko | 2 | 6 | [10]
(Russia) V Kudermetova (Kazakhstan) E Rybakina | 1 | 6 | [10]
(Czech Republic) M Bouzková (Czech Republic) L Hradecká | 6 | 1 | [3]

Semifinals
(Ukraine) L Kichenok (Latvia) J Ostapenko | 4 | 3
(Russia) V Kudermetova (Kazakhstan) E Rybakina | 6 | 6

=== Bottom half ===
First round
8 | (Canada) S Fichman (Mexico) G Olmos | 6 | 6
(Russia) D Kasatkina (Estonia) A Kontaveit | 3 | 4
(Japan) M Ninomiya (United States) S Santamaria | 7^{7} | 3 | [10]
(Belgium) K Flipkens (Spain) S Sorribes Tormo | 6^{5} | 6 | [6]
(Ukraine) N Kichenok (Romania) R Olaru | 3 | 6 | [7]
(United States) A Muhammad (United States) J Pegula | 6 | 3 | [10]
(India) S Mirza (China) S Zhang | 6 | 3 | [13]
3 | (Japan) S Aoyama (Japan) E Shibahara | 4 | 6 | [15]
5 | (United States) N Melichar-Martinez (Netherlands) D Schuurs | 6 | 6
(Czech Republic) K Peschke (Netherlands) A Rus | 4 | 3
(Romania) I-C Begu (Czech Republic) R Voráčová | 1 | 1
(Canada) L Fernandez (United States) C Gauff | 6 | 6
(United States) B Mattek-Sands (Poland) I Świątek | 6 | 6
PR | (Germany) J Lohoff (Russia) A Panova | 1 | 3
WC | (United States) A Anisimova (Ukraine) D Yastremska | 1 | 1
2 | (Chinese Taipei) S-w Hsieh (Belgium) E Mertens | 6 | 6

Second round
8 | (Canada) S Fichman (Mexico) G Olmos | 4 | 2
(Japan) M Ninomiya (United States) S Santamaria | 6 | 6
(United States) A Muhammad (United States) J Pegula | 3 | 4
3 | (Japan) S Aoyama (Japan) E Shibahara | 6 | 6
5 | (United States) N Melichar-Martinez (Netherlands) D Schuurs | 3 | 2
(Canada) L Fernandez (United States) C Gauff | 6 | 6
(United States) B Mattek-Sands (Poland) I Świątek | 6 | 4 | [8]
2 | (Chinese Taipei) S-w Hsieh (Belgium) E Mertens | 1 | 6 | [10]

Quarterfinals
(Japan) M Ninomiya (United States) S Santamaria | 1 | 6^{2}
3 | (Japan) S Aoyama (Japan) E Shibahara | 6 | 7^{7}
(Canada) L Fernandez (United States) C Gauff | 5 | 4
2 | (Chinese Taipei) S-w Hsieh (Belgium) E Mertens | 7 | 6

Semifinals
3 | (Japan) S Aoyama (Japan) E Shibahara | 2 | 0
2 | (Chinese Taipei) S-w Hsieh (Belgium) E Mertens | 6 | 6
