= 2015 Coleman Vision Tennis Championships – Doubles =

Doubles
- 2015 Coleman Vision Tennis Championships

Final
- Champions: (Brazil) Paula Cristina Gonçalves (United States) Sanaz Marand
- Runners-up: (Austria) Tamira Paszek (United States) Anna Tatishvili
- Score: 4–6, 6–2, [10–3]

Events
| Singles | Doubles |
| ← 2014 · | Coleman Vision Tennis Championships | · 2016 → |

Jan Abaza and Melanie Oudin were the defending champions, but Oudin chose not to compete. Abaza partnered Amra Sadiković, but they lost in the first round to Tamira Paszek and Anna Tatishvili.

The top seeds Paula Cristina Gonçalves and Sanaz Marand won the title, defeating Paszek and Tatishvili in the final, 4–6, 6–2, [10–3].

== Seeds ==
1. (Brazil) Paula Cristina Gonçalves / (United States) Sanaz Marand (champions)
2. (United States) Ashley Weinhold / (United States) Caitlin Whoriskey (semifinals)
3. (South Africa) Michelle Sammons / (Thailand) Varatchaya Wongteanchai (quarterfinals)
4. (United States) Louisa Chirico / (United States) Maria Sanchez (semifinals)

== Draw ==
=== Key ===
- Q = Qualifier
- WC = Wild card
- LL = Lucky loser
- Alt = Alternate
- ITF = ITF entry
- PR = Protected ranking
- SR = Special ranking
- SE = Special exempt
- JE = Junior exempt
- JR = Junior Accelerator Programme entrant
- CO = College Accelerator Programme entrant
- NG = Next Gen Accelerator Program entrant
- w/o = Walkover
- r = Retired
- d = Defaulted

First round
1 | (Brazil) PC Gonçalves (United States) S Marand | 6 | 4 | [10]
(United States) S Crawford (United States) S Vickery | 3 | 6 | [5]
(United States) A Glatch (United States) A Stevenson | 6^{2} | 4
(Serbia) J Jakšić (Belgium) A-S Mestach | 7^{7} | 6
4 | (United States) L Chirico (United States) M Sanchez | 6 | 4 | [10]
(United States) J Cako (Germany) L Schäder | 4 | 6 | [7]
(United States) K Christian (United States) D Lao | 6^{6} | 5
(United States) S Chang (United States) E Halbauer | 7^{8} | 7
(United States) J Abaza (Switzerland) A Sadiković | 3 | 5
(Austria) T Paszek (United States) A Tatishvili | 6 | 7
Alt | (Bosnia and Herzegovina) E Burgić Bucko (United States) A Morozova | 6 | 5 | [5]
3 | (South Africa) M Sammons (Thailand) V Wongteanchai | 3 | 7 | [10]
(United States) L Albanese (United States) J Jones | 3 | 4
(United States) J Boserup (United States) N Gibbs | 6 | 6
(United States) A Facey (United States) K Facey | 1 | 3
2 | (United States) A Weinhold (United States) C Whoriskey | 6 | 6

Quarterfinals
1 | (Brazil) PC Gonçalves (United States) S Marand | w/o
(Serbia) J Jakšić (Belgium) A-S Mestach
4 | (United States) L Chirico (United States) M Sanchez | 6 | 6
(United States) S Chang (United States) E Halbauer | 3 | 1
(Austria) T Paszek (United States) A Tatishvili | 4 | 7^{7} | [12]
3 | (South Africa) M Sammons (Thailand) V Wongteanchai | 6 | 6^{5} | [10]
(United States) J Boserup (United States) N Gibbs | 7 | 3 | [7]
2 | (United States) A Weinhold (United States) C Whoriskey | 5 | 6 | [10]

Semifinals
1 | (Brazil) PC Gonçalves (United States) S Marand | 6 | 7^{7}
4 | (United States) L Chirico (United States) M Sanchez | 2 | 6^{4}
(Austria) T Paszek (United States) A Tatishvili | 6 | 6
2 | (United States) A Weinhold (United States) C Whoriskey | 0 | 2

Final
1 | (Brazil) PC Gonçalves (United States) S Marand | 4 | 6 | [10]
(Austria) T Paszek (United States) A Tatishvili | 6 | 2 | [3]
