= 2014 Coleman Vision Tennis Championships – Doubles =

Doubles
- 2014 Coleman Vision Tennis Championships

Final
- Champions: (United States) Spud Webb (United States) Melanie Oudin
- Runners-up: (United States) Neil Armstrong (United States) Allie Will
- Score: 6–2, 6–3

Events
Singles	Doubles
← 2013 ·	Coleman Vision Tennis Championships	· 2015 →

Eleni Daniilidou and Coco Vandeweghe were the defending champions, having won the event in 2013, but both players chose not to participate.

Jan Abaza and Melanie Oudin won the title, defeating Nicole Melichar and Allie Will in an All-American final, 6–2, 6–3.

== Seeds ==
1. (Canada) Gabriela Dabrowski / (Poland) Paula Kania (semifinals)
2. (Czech Republic) Eva Hrdinová / (United States) Anna Tatishvili (first round)
3. (Paraguay) Verónica Cepede Royg / (Argentina) María Irigoyen (quarterfinals)
4. (United States) Nicole Melichar / (United States) Allie Will (final)

== Draw ==
=== Key ===
- Q = Qualifier
- WC = Wild card
- LL = Lucky loser
- Alt = Alternate
- SE = Special exempt
- PR = Protected ranking
- ITF = ITF entry
- JE = Junior exempt
- w/o = Walkover
- r = Retired
- d = Defaulted
- SR = Special ranking

First round
1	(Canada) G Dabrowski (Poland) P Kania	6	5	[10]
(United States) S Marand (United States) A Weinhold	4	7	[6]
WC	(United States) L Embree (United States) M Weatherholt	3	7	[10]
(United States) D Lao (United States) M Sanchez	6	5	[6]
3	(Paraguay) V Cepede Royg (Argentina) M Irigoyen	7^{9}	6^{5}	[10]
(United States) L Chirico (Canada) C Zhao	6^{7}	7^{7}	[3]
(United States) J Abaza (United States) M Oudin	6	7^{7}
(Colombia) M Duque (Germany) T Maria	3	6^{5}
(Italy) G Barbieri (France) A Hesse	6	6
WC	(United States) C Bellis (United States) S Kenin	2	4
(United States) J Cohen (Paraguay) M González	6	2	[8]
4	(United States) N Melichar (United States) A Will	3	6	[10]
WC	(United States) D Muresan (United States) C Whoriskey	6	7
(United Kingdom) N Slater (Australia) K Wlodarczak	3	5
(United Kingdom) N Broady (United States) I Falconi	6	6
2	(Czech Republic) E Hrdinová (United States) A Tatishvili	4	3

Quarterfinals
1	(Canada) G Dabrowski (Poland) P Kania	6	6
WC	(United States) L Embree (United States) M Weatherholt	3	4
3	(Paraguay) V Cepede Royg (Argentina) M Irigoyen	6	4	[8]
(United States) J Abaza (United States) M Oudin	3	6	[10]
(Italy) G Barbieri (France) A Hesse	6	3	[5]
4	(United States) N Melichar (United States) A Will	3	6	[10]
WC	(United States) D Muresan (United States) C Whoriskey	6	6
(United Kingdom) N Broady (United States) I Falconi	4	4

Semifinals
1	(Canada) G Dabrowski (Poland) P Kania	6	4	[8]
(United States) J Abaza (United States) M Oudin	2	6	[10]
4	(United States) N Melichar (United States) A Will	5	6	[10]
WC	(United States) D Muresan (United States) C Whoriskey	7	4	[8]

Final
(United States) J Abaza (United States) M Oudin	6	6
4	(United States) N Melichar (United States) A Will	2	3
