= 2015 Coleman Vision Tennis Championships – Singles =

Singles
- 2015 Coleman Vision Tennis Championships

Final
- Champion: (Netherlands) Michaëlla Krajicek
- Runner-up: (United Kingdom) Naomi Broady
- Score: 6–7^{(2–7)}, 7–6^{(7–3)}, 7–5

Events
Singles	Doubles
← 2014 ·	Coleman Vision Tennis Championships	· 2016 →

Anna Tatishvili was the defending champion, but she lost to Julia Boserup in the quarterfinals.

Michaëlla Krajicek came through qualifying and won the tournament, defeating Naomi Broady in the final, 6–7^{(2–7)}, 7–6^{(7–3)}, 7–5.

== Seeds ==
1. (Belgium) An-Sophie Mestach (quarterfinals)
2. (United States) Anna Tatishvili (quarterfinals)
3. (United States) Louisa Chirico (first round)
4. (United States) Nicole Gibbs (first round)
5. (United States) Sachia Vickery (second round)
6. (United States) Alexa Glatch (second round)
7. (United Kingdom) Naomi Broady (final)
8. (United States) Maria Sanchez (second round)

== Main draw ==
=== Key ===
- Q = Qualifier
- WC = Wild card
- LL = Lucky loser
- Alt = Alternate
- SE = Special exempt
- PR = Protected ranking
- ITF = ITF entry
- JE = Junior exempt
- w/o = Walkover
- r = Retired
- d = Defaulted
- SR = Special ranking

=== Finals ===
Semifinals
7	(United Kingdom) Naomi Broady	6	5	6
Q	(Switzerland) Amra Sadiković	4	7	4
Q	(Netherlands) Michaëlla Krajicek	6	6
WC	(United States) Julia Boserup	3	2

Final
7	(United Kingdom) Naomi Broady	7^{7}	6^{3}	5
Q	(Netherlands) Michaëlla Krajicek	6^{2}	7^{7}	7

=== Top half ===
First round
1	(Belgium) A-S Mestach	6	6
(United States) S Crawford	0	2
(Thailand) V Wongteanchai	3	4
Q	(United States) R Anderson	6	6
WC	(United States) J Jones	6	6
(United States) A Stevenson	2	3
Q	(Norway) U Eikeri	2	2
7	(United Kingdom) N Broady	6	6
4	(United States) N Gibbs	6	3	4
Q	(Switzerland) A Sadiković	4	6	6
(Canada) H El Tabakh	3	1^{r}
(France) S Reix	6	3
WC	(United States) J Abaza	6^{7}	1
(Austria) T Paszek	7^{9}	6
(Slovenia) P Rampre	2	3
5	(United States) S Vickery	6	6

Second round
1	(Belgium) A-S Mestach	6	6
Q	(United States) R Anderson	4	4
WC	(United States) J Jones	1	6^{7}
7	(United Kingdom) N Broady	6	7^{9}
Q	(Switzerland) A Sadiković	7^{7}	6
(France) S Reix	6^{4}	2
(Austria) T Paszek	7	6
5	(United States) S Vickery	5	2

Quarterfinals
1	(Belgium) A-S Mestach	3	3
7	(United Kingdom) N Broady	6	6
Q	(Switzerland) A Sadiković	6	6
(Austria) T Paszek	4	3

Semifinals
7	(United Kingdom) N Broady	6	5	6
Q	(Switzerland) A Sadiković	4	7	4

=== Bottom half ===
First round
6	(United States) A Glatch	6	6
(United States) L Albanese	3	3
(United States) V King	6	2	6
(Belgium) K Liebens	1	6	2
Q	(Netherlands) M Krajicek	7^{7}	6
WC	(United States) V Duval	6^{3}	3
(United States) D Lao	6	4	6
3	(United States) L Chirico	4	6	4
8	(United States) M Sanchez	6	2	6
(Brazil) PC Gonçalves	2	6	3
WC	(United States) J Boserup	6	7
(Serbia) J Jakšić	3	5
(United States) C Whoriskey	4	6	2^{r}
(United States) S Marand	6	1	5
PR	(United Kingdom) L Whybourn	4	6^{6}
2	(United States) A Tatishvili	6	7^{8}

Second round
6	(United States) A Glatch	6	4	5
(United States) V King	0	6	7
Q	(Netherlands) M Krajicek	6	6
(United States) D Lao	4	1
8	(United States) M Sanchez	3	3
WC	(United States) J Boserup	6	6
(United States) S Marand	0	3
2	(United States) A Tatishvili	6	6

Quarterfinals
(United States) V King
Q	(Netherlands) M Krajicek	w/o
WC	(United States) J Boserup	3	7	6
2	(United States) A Tatishvili	6	5	2

Semifinals
Q	(Netherlands) M Krajicek	6	6
WC	(United States) J Boserup	3	2
