= Emina Bektas =

American tennis player

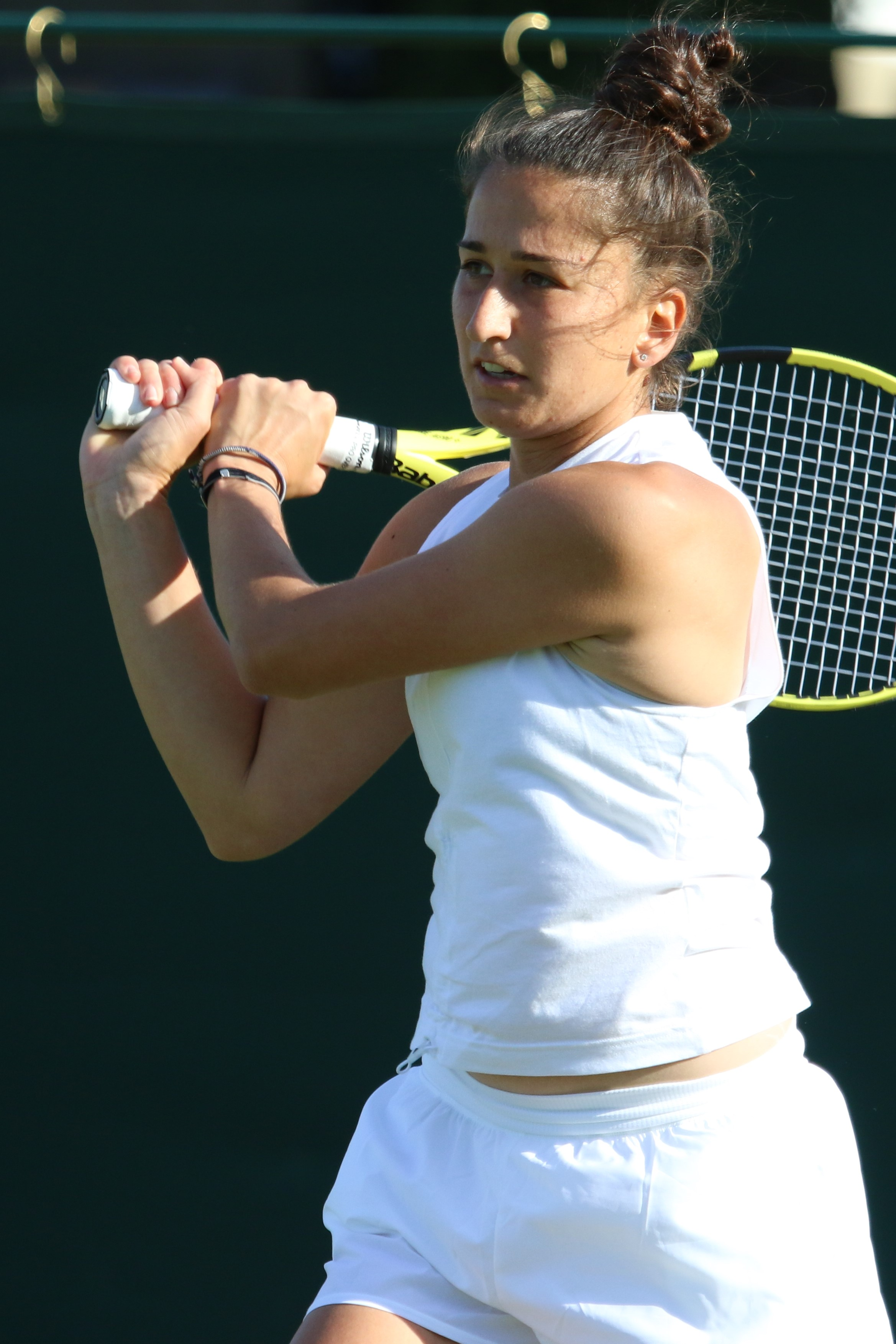
- Bektas at the 2022 Wimbledon Championships
- Country (sports): United States
- Residence: Indianapolis, United States
- Born: March 30, 1993 (age 33) Germany
- Plays: Right-handed (two-handed backhand)
- College: University of Michigan
- Prize money: $1,090,467

Singles
- Career record: 279–208
- Career titles: 1 WTA Challenger, 8 ITF
- Highest ranking: No. 82 (November 6, 2023)
- Current ranking: No. 570 (May 25, 2026)

Grand Slam singles results
- Australian Open: 1R (2022, 2024)
- French Open: 1R (2024)
- Wimbledon: 1R (2022, 2024)
- US Open: Q3 (2023)

Doubles
- Career record: 219–115
- Career titles: 26 ITF
- Highest ranking: No. 78 (July 11, 2022)
- Current ranking: No. 1358 (May 25, 2026)

Grand Slam doubles results
- Australian Open: 1R (2024)
- French Open: 2R (2022)
- Wimbledon: 1R (2021, 2022)
- US Open: 1R (2017, 2021)

Grand Slam mixed doubles results
- US Open: 1R (2016)
- Last updated on: June 5, 2026.

Emina Bektas (born March 30, 1993) is an American inactive tennis player.

She has career-high WTA rankings of No. 82 in singles, reached on November 6, 2023, and No. 78 in doubles, achieved on July 11, 2022. Bektas has won one singles title on the WTA Challenger Tour along with eight titles in singles and 26 in doubles on the ITF Circuit.

== Career ==
=== 2016–17: Major doubles debut ===
Bektas made her Grand Slam tournament debut at the 2016 US Open in the mixed doubles main draw with Evan King; they fell in the first round.

The following year, she teamed with Amanda Anisimova as a wildcard entry in the women's doubles at the 2017 US Open, again losing in the first round.

To date, she won her biggest singles championship on ITF Circuit at the 2017 Coleman Vision Tennis Championships in Albuquerque.

=== 2022–23: Major singles and top 100 debuts, first WTA 125 title ===
She qualified into the main draw in her Grand Slam singles debut at the Australian Open, losing in the first round to Liudmila Samsonova.

She reached her first WTA Tour doubles final in April at the 2022 Copa Colsanitas partnering Tara Moore.

She also qualified into the Wimbledon Championships, making her debut at this major but lost in the first round to Bianca Andreescu.

In 2023, she won the WTA 125 Abierto Tampico defeating Anna Kalinskaya in the final, and reached the top 100, on 6 November. She became the fourth oldest player to reach the milestone.

== Personal life ==
Emina is of Bosnian descent. She was married to fellow professional tennis player Tara Moore.

Bektas attended college at the University of Michigan from 2011 to 2015.

== Performance timelines ==
Key
W	F	SF	QF	#R	RR	Q#	DNQ	A	NH

(W) winner; (F) finalist; (SF) semifinalist; (QF) quarterfinalist; (#R) rounds 4, 3, 2, 1; (RR) round-robin stage; (Q#) qualification round; (DNQ) did not qualify; (A) absent; (NH) not held; (SR) strike rate (events won / competed); (W–L) win–loss record.
To avoid confusion and double counting, these charts are updated at the conclusion of a tournament or when the player's participation has ended.

Only main-draw results in WTA Tour, Grand Slam tournaments, Billie Jean King Cup, United Cup, Hopman Cup and Olympic Games are included in win–loss records.

=== Singles ===
Tournament	2021	2022	2023	2024	SR	W–L
Grand Slam tournaments
Australian Open	A	1R	A	1R	0 / 2	0–2
French Open	A	Q1	A	1R	0 / 1	0–1
Wimbledon	A	1R	Q1	1R	0 / 2	0–2
US Open	A	Q1	Q3	Q1	0 / 0	0–0
Win–loss	0–0	0–2	0–0	0–3	0 / 5	0–5
WTA 1000 tournaments
Canadian Open	A	Q1	Q2		0 / 0	0–0
China Open	NH		Q1		0 / 0	0–0
Career statistics
Tournaments	2	2	4		Career total: 8	
Overall win–loss	0–2	0–2	6–4		0 / 8	6–8
Year-end ranking (Note: 2013: WTA ranking– 799, 2014–15: WTA ranking– n/a, 2016: WTA ranking– 549, 2017: WTA ranking– 258, 2018: WTA ranking– 408, 2019: WTA ranking– 421, 2020: WTA ranking– 417.)	239	360	82		$583,466	

=== Doubles ===
Current through the 2023 US Open.

Tournament	2017	2018	2019	2020	2021	2022	2023	SR	W–L
Grand Slam tournaments
Australian Open	A	A	A	A	A	A	A	0 / 0	0–0
French Open	A	A	A	A	A	2R (Note: Withdrawal during the tournament not counted as loss.)	A	0 / 1	1–0
Wimbledon	A	A	A	A	1R	1R	A	0 / 2	0–2
US Open	1R	A	A	A	1R	A	A	0 / 2	0–2
Win–loss	0–1	0–0	0–0	0–0	0–2	1–1	0–0	0 / 5	1–4
WTA 1000 tournaments
Canadian Open	A	A	A	NH	2R	A	A	0 / 1	1–1
Career statistics
Tournaments	1	1	0	1	14	5	0	Career total: 22	
Titles	0	0	0	0	0	0	0	Career total: 0	
Finals	0	0	0	0	0	1	0	Career total: 1	
Overall win–loss	0–1	0–1	0–0	0–1	5–14	6–4	0–0	0 / 22	11–21
Year-end ranking (Note: 2013: WTA ranking– 1064, 2014–15: WTA ranking– n/a, 2016: WTA ranking– 296.)	138	435	209	243	118	102	213		

== WTA Tour finals ==
=== Doubles: 1 (runner-up) ===
Legend WTA 500 WTA 250 (0–1)	Finals by surface Hard (0–0) Clay (0–1)

Result	W–L	Date	Tournament	Tier	Surface	Partner	Opponents	Score
Loss	0–1	Apr 2022	Copa Colsanitas, Colombia	WTA 250	Clay	(United Kingdom) Tara Moore	(Australia) Astra Sharma (Indonesia) Aldila Sutjiadi	6–4, 4–6, [9–11]

== WTA 125 finals ==
=== Singles: 1 (title) ===
Result	W–L	Date	Tournament	Surface	Opponent	Score
Win	1–0	Oct 2023	Abierto Tampico, Mexico	Hard	(Russia) Anna Kalinskaya	6–3, 3–6, 7–6^{(3)}

== ITF Circuit finals ==
=== Singles: 14 (8 titles, 6 runner-ups) ===
Legend $80,000 tournaments (1–0) $60,000 tournaments (3–2) $25,000 tournaments (2–3) $10,000 tournaments (2–1)	Finals by surface Hard (6–5) Carpet (2–1)

Result	W–L	Date	Tournament	Tier	Surface	Opponent	Score
Win	1–0	Jul 2013	ITF Evansville, United States	10,000	Hard	(United States) Brooke Austin	4–6, 6–4, 6–3
Loss	1–1	Jul 2016	ITF Evansville, United States	10,000	Hard	(United States) Kennedy Shaffer	4–6, 6–1, 2–6
Win	2–1	Oct 2016	ITF Mexico City, Mexico	10,000	Hard	(Mexico) Victoria Rodríguez	6–3, 6–1
Win	3–1	Sep 2017	Albuquerque Championships, US	80,000	Hard	(United States) Maria Sanchez	6–4, 6–2
Loss	3–2	Jun 2021	ITF Santo Domingo, Dominican Republic	W25	Hard	(Mexico) Ana Sofía Sánchez	6–3, 6–7^{(3)}, 6–7^{(9)}
Win	4–2	Oct 2021	Las Vegas Open, US	W60	Hard	(Japan) Yuriko Miyazaki	6–1, 6–1
Win	5–2	Nov 2022	ITF Funchal, Portugal	W25	Hard	(United States) Ashley Lahey	2–6, 6–3, 6–2
Loss	5–3	Dec 2022	ITF Sëlva, Italy	W25	Hard (i)	(Denmark) Clara Tauson	3–6, 5–7
Win	6–3	Mar 2023	ITF Pretoria, South Africa	W25	Hard	(Israel) Lina Glushko	3–6, 6–3, 7–6^{(6)}
Loss	6–4	Apr 2023	ITF Sharm El Sheikh, Egypt	W25	Hard	(Italy) Lucrezia Stefanini	3–6, 6–7^{(5)}
Win	7–4	May 2023	Kurume Cup, Japan	W60	Carpet	(China) Ma Yexin	7–5, 5–7, 6–1
Loss	7–5	Jul 2023	ITF Saskatoon, Canada	W60	Hard	(Canada) Victoria Mboko	4–6, 4–6
Loss	7–6	May 2024	Fukuoka International, Japan	W75	Carpet	(Australia) Kimberly Birrell	2–6, 4–6
Win	8–6	May 2024	Kurume Cup, Japan	W75	Carpet	(Australia) Arina Rodionova	7–6^{(1)}, 3–6, 6–3

=== Doubles: 40 (26 titles, 14 runner-ups) ===
Legend $100,000 tournaments (1–0) $60,000 tournaments (6–2) $25,000 tournaments (14–8) $10/15,000 tournaments (5–3)	Finals by surface Hard (18–13) Clay (6–1) Grass (1–0) Carpet (1–0)

Result	W–L	Date	Tournament	Tier	Surface	Partner	Opponents	Score
Win	1–0	Jul 2013	ITF Evansville, US	10,000	Hard	(United States) Brooke Bolender	(United States) Denise Mureșan (United States) Jacqueline Wu	6–3, 6–4
Loss	1–1	Jan 2016	ITF Fort de France, Martinique	10,000	Hard	(United States) Zoë Gwen Scandalis	(Romania) Jaqueline Cristian (Italy) Gaia Sanesi	6–7^{(5)}, 6–7^{(5)}
Win	2–1	Jan 2016	ITF Saint Martin, Guadeloupe	10,000	Hard	(United States) Alexa Bortles	(United States) Alexandra Morozova (Israel) Keren Shlomo	6–4, 6–2
Loss	2–2	Feb 2016	ITF Surprise, US	25,000	Hard	(United States) Sarah Lee	(United States) Jacqueline Cako (United States) Danielle Lao	2–6, 6–4, [8–10]
Win	3–2	May 2016	ITF Antalya, Turkey	10,000	Hard	(United States) Sarah Lee	(Turkey) Ayla Aksu (Bulgaria) Julia Stamatova	6–0, 6–3
Win	4–2	Sep 2016	ITF Lubbock, US	25,000	Hard	(United States) Catherine Harrison	(Bosnia and Herzegovina) Ema Burgić Bucko (Mexico) Renata Zarazúa	6–3, 6–4
Win	5–2	Oct 2016	ITF Stillwater, US	25,000	Hard	(United States) Ronit Yurovsky	(Mexico) Giuliana Olmos (Mexico) Nazari Urbina	6–4, 6–7^{(6)}, [10–6]
Win	6–2	Oct 2016	ITF Mexico City, Mexico	10,000	Hard	(United States) Jessica Wacnik	(Mexico) Alexia Coutiño Castillo (Mexico) Victoria Rodríguez	6–3, 6–4
Loss	6–3	Feb 2017	ITF Wirral, UK	15,000	Hard (i)	(United States) Ronit Yurovsky	(Poland) Maja Chwalińska (Japan) Miyabi Inoue	4–6, 4–6
Win	7–3	Mar 2017	ITF Orlando, US	15,000	Clay	(United States) Sanaz Marand	(United States) Chiara Scholl (Mexico) Marcela Zacarías	6–1, 6–3
Loss	7–4	Mar 2017	ITF Tampa, US	15,000	Hard (i)	(United States) Sanaz Marand	(Chile) Alexa Guarachi (Chinese Taipei) Hsu Chieh-yu	3–6, 6–4, [4–10]
Win	8–4	Apr 2017	ITF Pelham, US	25,000	Clay	(United States) Sanaz Marand	(United Kingdom) Amanda Carreras (Croatia) Tena Lukas	w/o
Win	9–4	Apr 2017	Dothan Pro Classic, US	60,000	Clay	(United States) Sanaz Marand	(United States) Kristie Ahn (Australia) Lizette Cabrera	6–3, 1–6, [10–2]
Win	10–4	May 2017	ITF Charleston Pro, US	60,000	Clay	(Chile) Alexa Guarachi	(United States) Kaitlyn Christian (United States) Sabrina Santamaria	5–7, 6–3, [10–5]
Win	11–4	May 2017	ITF Naples, US	25,000	Clay	(United States) Sanaz Marand	(United States) Danielle Collins (United States) Taylor Townsend	7–6^{(1)}, 6–1
Win	12–4	May 2017	ITF Naples 2, US	25,000	Clay	(Chile) Alexa Guarachi	(United States) Sophie Chang (Norway) Ulrikke Eikeri	6–3, 6–1
Win	13–4	Jul 2017	ITF Auburn, US	25,000	Hard	(Chile) Alexa Guarachi	(Australia) Ellen Perez (Brazil) Luisa Stefani	4–6, 6–4, [10–5]
Loss	13–5	Jan 2019	ITF Daytona Beach, US	25,000	Clay	(United States) Hailey Baptiste	(Hungary) Anna Bondár (Norway) Ulrikke Eikeri	3–6, 7–5, [9–11]
Loss	13–6	Feb 2019	ITF Surprise, US	25,000	Hard	(United States) Usue Maitane Arconada	(United States) Coco Gauff (New Zealand) Paige Hourigan	3–6, 6–4, [12–14]
Loss	13–7	Mar 2019	ITF Nishitama, Japan	25,000	Hard	(United Kingdom) Tara Moore	(Japan) Haruna Arakawa (Japan) Minori Yonehara	4–6, 3–6
Loss	13–8	Mar 2019	ITF Kofu, Japan	25,000	Hard	(United Kingdom) Tara Moore	(Chinese Taipei) Chang Kai-chen (Chinese Taipei) Hsu Ching-wen	1–6, 3–6
Loss	13–9	Apr 2019	ITF Sunderland, UK	25,000	Hard (i)	(United Kingdom) Tara Moore	(Poland) Maja Chwalińska (Norway) Ulrikke Eikeri	4–6, 6–3, [9–11]
Win	14–9	Sep 2019	ITF Redding, US	25,000	Hard	(United Kingdom) Tara Moore	(United States) Catherine Harrison (New Zealand) Paige Hourigan	6–3, 6–1
Win	15–9	Oct 2019	ITF Florence, US	25,000	Hard	(United Kingdom) Tara Moore	(Australia) Olivia Tjandramulia (Mexico) Marcela Zacarías	7–5, 6–4
Win	16–9	Jan 2021	Georgia's Rome Open, US	W60	Hard	(United Kingdom) Tara Moore	(Belarus) Olga Govortsova (Serbia) Jovana Jović	5–7, 6–2, [10–8]
Win	17–9	Feb 2021	ITF Orlando, US	W25	Hard	(United Kingdom) Tara Moore	(Switzerland) Conny Perrin (Colombia) Camila Osorio	7–5, 2–6, [10–5]
Loss	17–10	Mar 2021	ITF Newport Beach, US	W25	Hard (i)	(United Kingdom) Tara Moore	(United States) Vania King (United States) Maegan Manasse	4–6, 2–6
Win	18–10	Apr 2021	Dubai Tennis Challenge, United Arab Emirates	W25	Hard	(United Kingdom) Tara Moore	(Turkey) Berfu Cengiz (Turkey) İpek Öz	7–5, 4–6, [10–7]
Loss	18–11	Jun 2021	ITF Santo Domingo, Dominican Republic	W25	Hard	(United States) Quinn Gleason	(Japan) Erina Hayashi (Japan) Kanako Morisaki	7–6^{(3)}, 1–6, [7–10]
Win	19–11	Jun 2021	ITF Santo Domingo	W25	Hard	(United States) Quinn Gleason	(Dominican Republic) Kelly Williford (Dominican Republic) Ana Carmen Zamburek	7–5, 6–4
Win	20–11	Jun 2021	ITF Sumter, US	W25	Hard	(United States) Catherine Harrison	(New Zealand) Paige Hourigan (Indonesia) Aldila Sutjiadi	7–5, 6–4
Loss	20–12	Oct 2021	Las Vegas Open, US	W60	Hard	(United Kingdom) Tara Moore	(United States) Quinn Gleason (Slovakia) Tereza Mihalíková	6–7^{(5)}, 5–7
Win	21–12	Jan 2022	ITF Traralgon, Australia	W60+H	Hard	(United Kingdom) Tara Moore	(United States) Catherine Harrison (Indonesia) Aldila Sutjiadi	0–6, 7–6^{(1)}, [10–8]
Loss	21–13	Feb 2022	Georgia's Rome Open, US	W60	Hard (i)	(United Kingdom) Tara Moore	(United States) Sophie Chang (United States) Angela Kulikov	3–6, 7–6^{(2)}, [7–10]
Win	22–13	Feb 2023	Guanajuato Open, Mexico	W60+H	Hard	(United States) Ingrid Neel	(France) Elixane Lechemia (United States) Quinn Gleason	7–6^{(4)}, 3–6, [10–6]
Win	23-13	Mar 2023	ITF Pretoria, South Africa	W25	Hard	(Israel) Lina Glushko	(Hungary) Tímea Babos (Spain) Georgina Garcia Perez	6–3, 4–6, [13–11]
Win	24-13	Apr 2023	ITF Sharm El Sheikh, Egypt	W25	Hard	(Hong Kong) Eudice Chong	Darya Astakhova; Ekaterina Reyngold	6–2, 6–4
Win	25–13	May 2023	Fukuoka International, Japan	W60	Carpet	(Israel) Lina Glushko	(China) Ma Yexin (Australia) Alana Parnaby	7–5, 6–3
Win	26–13	Jun 2024	Surbiton Trophy, UK	W100	Grass	(Serbia) Aleksandra Krunić	(United Kingdom) Sarah Beth Grey (United Kingdom) Tara Moore	6–1, 6–1
Loss	26–14	Apr 2025	Kangaroo Cup, Japan	W100	Hard	(United Kingdom) Lily Miyazaki	(Japan) Momoko Kobori (Japan) Ayano Shimizu	1–6, 2–6
