= 2012 Coleman Vision Tennis Championships – Singles =

Singles
- 2012 Coleman Vision Tennis Championships

Final
- Champion: (United States) Maria Sanchez
- Runner-up: (United States) Lauren Davis
- Score: 6–1, 6–1

Events
Singles	Doubles
- Coleman Vision Tennis Championships

Regina Kulikova was the defending champion, but chose not to participate.

Maria Sanchez won the title, defeating Lauren Davis in the final, 6–1, 6–1.

== Seeds ==
1. (Romania) Edina Gallovits-Hall (first round)
2. (Portugal) Michelle Larcher de Brito (semifinals)
3. (United States) Lauren Davis (final)
4. (Australia) Anastasia Rodionova (first round)
5. (United States) Irina Falconi (quarterfinals)
6. (United States) Alison Riske (semifinals)
7. (Canada) Heidi El Tabakh (quarterfinals)
8. (United States) Jessica Pegula (quarterfinals)

== Main draw ==
Key

- Q = Qualifier
- WC = Wild card
- LL = Lucky loser
- Alt = Alternate
- ITF = ITF entry
- PR = Protected ranking
- SR = Special ranking
- SE = Special exempt
- JE = Junior exempt
- JR = Junior Accelerator Programme entrant
- CO = College Accelerator Programme entrant
- NG = Next Gen Accelerator Program entrant
- w/o = Walkover
- r = Retired
- d = Defaulted

=== Finals ===
Semifinals
6	(United States) Alison Riske	4	6	1
3	(United States) Lauren Davis	6	3	6
(United States) Maria Sanchez	6	7^{7}
2	(Portugal) Michelle Larcher de Brito	4	6^{5}

Final
3	(United States) Lauren Davis	1	1
(United States) Maria Sanchez	6	6

=== Top half ===
First round
1	(Romania) E Gallovits-Hall	6	3	6^{4}
WC	(United States) A Will	3	6	7^{7}
WC	(United States) A Muhammed	7	6
(United States) M Brengle	5	1
(Switzerland) A Sadiković	4	6	7^{7}
(Canada) M-È Pelletier	6	4	6^{3}
Q	(Bolivia) MF Álvarez Terán	3	4
6	(United States) A Riske	6	6
3	(United States) L Davis	6	4	6
(United States) S Rogers	3	6	3
(Slovenia) P Rampre	2	6	1
(United States) G Min	6	4	6
WC	(United States) J Elie	3	6^{4}
(Paraguay) V Cepede Royg	6	7^{7}
(United States) J Boserup	6	5	3
8	(United States) J Pegula	1	7	6

Second round
WC	(United States) A Will	6	6^{2}	5
WC	(United States) A Muhammed	4	7^{7}	7
(Switzerland) A Sadiković	6^{8}	1
6	(United States) A Riske	7^{10}	6
3	(United States) L Davis	6	7^{7}
(United States) G Min	2	6^{2}
(Paraguay) V Cepede Royg	4	2
8	(United States) J Pegula	6	6

Quarterfinals
WC	(United States) A Muhammed	6^{6}	3
6	(United States) A Riske	7^{8}	6
3	(United States) L Davis	6	6^{9}	6
8	(United States) J Pegula	3	7^{11}	4

Semifinals
6	(United States) A Riske	4	6	1
3	(United States) L Davis	6	3	6

=== Bottom half ===
First round
5/WC	(United States) I Falconi	7	4	6
(United States) A Weinhold	5	6	2
(Croatia) M Abramović	3	6^{3}
(Canada) S Dubois	6	7^{7}
(United States) M Sanchez	6	6
(United States) C Scholl	4	2
Q	(United States) S Vickery	2	6	6
4	(Australia) A Rodionova	6	4	0
7	(Canada) H El Tabakh	4	6	7
(Russia) E Bovina	6	1	5
(United States) C-Y Hsu	7^{7}	3	7^{7}
Q	(United States) J Abaza	6^{4}	6	6^{5}
(Argentina) F Molinero	4	6^{0}
Q	(Venezuela) A Pérez	6	7^{7}
(Austria) N Rottmann	6^{2}	1
2	(Portugal) M Larcher de Brito	7^{7}	6

Second round
5/WC	(United States) I Falconi	3	6	6
(Canada) S Dubois	6	3	3
(United States) M Sanchez	5	6	7^{7}
Q	(United States) S Vickery	7	0	6^{4}
7	(Canada) H El Tabakh	7^{7}	7
(United States) C-Y Hsu	6^{2}	5
Q	(Venezuela) A Pérez	2	3
2	(Portugal) M Larcher de Brito	6	6

Quarterfinals
5/WC	(United States) I Falconi	4	0
(United States) M Sanchez	6	6
7	(Canada) H El Tabakh	5	3
2	(Portugal) M Larcher de Brito	7	6

Semifinals
(United States) M Sanchez	6	7^{5}
2	(Portugal) M Larcher de Brito	4	6^{5}
