= 2012 Coleman Vision Tennis Championships – Doubles =

Doubles
- 2012 Coleman Vision Tennis Championships

Final
- Champions: (United States) Asia Muhammed (United States) Yasmin Schnack
- Runners-up: (United States) Irina Falconi (United States) Maria Sanchez
- Score: 6–2, 1–6, [12–10]

Events
Singles	Doubles
- Coleman Vision Tennis Championships

Alexa Glatch and Asia Muhammed were the defending champions, but Glatch chose not to participate. Muhammed partnered up with Yasmin Schnack and won the title, defeating Irina Falconi and Maria Sanchez in the final, 6–2, 1–6, [12–10].

== Seeds ==
1. (United States) Irina Falconi / (United States) Maria Sanchez (final)
2. (United States) Jessica Pegula / (Canada) Marie-Ève Pelletier (quarterfinals)
3. (Russia) Elena Bovina / (Slovakia) Lenka Wienerová (first round)
4. (United States) Asia Muhammed / (United States) Yasmin Schnack (champions)

== Draw ==
Key

- Q = Qualifier
- WC = Wild card
- LL = Lucky loser
- Alt = Alternate
- ITF = ITF entry
- PR = Protected ranking
- SR = Special ranking
- SE = Special exempt
- JE = Junior exempt
- JR = Junior Accelerator Programme entrant
- CO = College Accelerator Programme entrant
- NG = Next Gen Accelerator Program entrant
- w/o = Walkover
- r = Retired
- d = Defaulted

First round
1	(United States) I Falconi (United States) M Sanchez	6	6
(United States) C-Y Hsu (United States) L Litvak	4	3
(United States) S Marand (United States) A Weinhold	3	2
(Croatia) M Abramović (Switzerland) A Sadiković	6	6
3	(Russia) E Bovina (Slovakia) L Wienerová	6	4	[5]
(United States) M Harkins (Austria) N Rottmann	1	6	[10]
(United States) J Elie (United States) E Lumpkin	2	2
(United States) N Melichar (United States) C Scholl	6	6
(United States) M Brengle (Czech Republic) N Fraňková	7^{7}	7^{7}
(Paraguay) V Cepede Royg (Argentina) F Molinero	6^{5}	6^{5}
WC	(United States) G Min (United States) S Rogers	4	6^{7}
4	(United States) A Muhammed (United States) Y Schnack	6	7^{9}
WC	(United States) A Riske (United States) A Will	6	6
WC	(United States) A Bhargava (United States) S Krywacz	4	4
(Bolivia) MF Álvarez Terán (Venezuela) A Pérez	2	3
2	(United States) J Pegula (Canada) M-È Pelletier	6	6

Quarterfinals
1	(United States) I Falconi (United States) M Sanchez	6^{4}	6	[10]
(Croatia) M Abramović (Switzerland) A Sadiković	7^{7}	4	[4]
(United States) M Harkins (Austria) N Rottmann	0	6	[9]
(United States) N Melichar (United States) C Scholl	6	1	[11]
(United States) M Brengle (Czech Republic) N Fraňková	5	1
4	(United States) A Muhammed (United States) Y Schnack	7	6
WC	(United States) A Riske (United States) A Will	6	6
2	(United States) J Pegula (Canada) M-È Pelletier	4	1

Semifinals
1	(United States) I Falconi (United States) M Sanchez	7	6
(United States) N Melichar (United States) C Scholl	5	2
4	(United States) A Muhammed (United States) Y Schnack	7^{7}	7
WC	(United States) A Riske (United States) A Will	6^{4}	5

Final
1	(United States) I Falconi (United States) M Sanchez	2	6	[10]
4	(United States) A Muhammed (United States) Y Schnack	6	1	[12]
