= Coleman Vision Tennis Championships =

Tennis tournament in New Mexico, US

- 2023 Coleman Vision Tennis Championships

ITF Women's Tour
- Event name: Albuquerque
- Location: Albuquerque, New Mexico, United States
- Venue: Tanoan Country Club
- Category: ITF Women's Circuit
- Surface: Hard
- Draw: 32S/32Q/16D
- Prize money: $80,000
- Website: Coleman Vision Tennis Championships

The Coleman Vision Tennis Championships is a tournament for professional female tennis players played on outdoor hard courts. The event is classified as a $80,000 ITF Women's Circuit tournament. It has been held in Albuquerque, New Mexico, United States, since 1998.

== Past finals ==
=== Singles ===
Year	Champion	Runner-up	Score
2017	(United States) Emina Bektas	(United States) Maria Sanchez	6–4, 6–2
2016	(Luxembourg) Mandy Minella	(Paraguay) Verónica Cepede Royg	6–4, 7–5
2015	(Netherlands) Michaëlla Krajicek	(United Kingdom) Naomi Broady	6–7^{(2–7)}, 7–6^{(7–3)}, 7–5
2014	(United States) Anna Tatishvili	(United States) Irina Falconi	6–2, 6–4
2013	(United States) Shelby Rogers	(Georgia (country)) Anna Tatishvili	6–2, 6–3
2012	(United States) Maria Sanchez	(United States) Lauren Davis	6–1, 6–1
2011	(Russia) Regina Kulikova	(Georgia (country)) Anna Tatishvili	7–5, 6–3
2010	(Croatia) Mirjana Lučić	(United States) Lindsay Lee-Waters	6–1, 6–4
2009	(United States) Shenay Perry	(Czech Republic) Barbora Záhlavová-Strýcová	7–5, 6–2
2008	(United States) Julie Ditty	(Paraguay) Rossana de los Ríos	6–4, 7–6^{(7–3)}
2007	(Paraguay) Rossana de los Ríos	(Estonia) Maret Ani	7–6^{(8–6)}, 1–6, 6–2
2006	(United States) Ahsha Rolle	(Puerto Rico) Kristina Brandi	6–2, 6–4
2005	(Russia) Anastasia Rodionova	(Canada) Maureen Drake	6–2, 6–3
2004	(United States) Marissa Gould	(Canada) Stéphanie Dubois	6–1, 4–6, 6–4
2003	(Puerto Rico) Kristina Brandi	(Venezuela) Milagros Sequera	6–2, 6–2
2002	(United States) Laura Granville	(Canada) Marie-Ève Pelletier	6–7^{(2–7)}, 6–4, 6–1
2001	(United States) Mashona Washington	(United States) Marissa Irvin	7–5, 6–3
2000	(United States) Brie Rippner	(Venezuela) María Vento-Kabchi	6–0, 6–0
1999	(United States) Jennifer Hopkins	(Venezuela) María Vento-Kabchi	4–6, 7–6, 6–4
1998	(Luxembourg) Anne Kremer	(United States) Jane Chi	2–6, 6–4, 6–4

=== Doubles ===
Year	Champions	Runners-up	Score
2017	(United Kingdom) Tara Moore (Switzerland) Conny Perrin	(Switzerland) Viktorija Golubic (Switzerland) Amra Sadiković	6–3, 6–3
2016	(Netherlands) Michaëlla Krajicek (United States) Maria Sanchez	(Luxembourg) Mandy Minella (Belgium) Elise Mertens	6–2, 6–4
2015	(Brazil) Paula Cristina Gonçalves (United States) Sanaz Marand	(Austria) Tamira Paszek (United States) Anna Tatishvili	4–6, 6–2, [10–3]
2014	(United States) Jan Abaza (United States) Melanie Oudin	(United States) Nicole Melichar (United States) Allie Will	6–2, 6–3
2013	(Greece) Eleni Daniilidou (United States) Coco Vandeweghe	(United States) Melanie Oudin (United States) Taylor Townsend	6–4, 7–6^{(7–2)}
2012	(United States) Asia Muhammed (United States) Yasmin Schnack	(United States) Irina Falconi (United States) Maria Sanchez	6–2, 1–6, [12–10]
2011	(United States) Alexa Glatch (United States) Asia Muhammed	(United States) Grace Min (United States) Melanie Oudin	4–6, 6–3, [10–2]
2010	(United States) Lindsay Lee-Waters (United States) Megan Moulton-Levy	(United States) Abigail Spears (United States) Mashona Washington	2–6, 6–3, [10–8]
2009	(United States) Mashona Washington (United States) Riza Zalameda	(Hungary) Melinda Czink (United States) Lindsay Lee-Waters	6–3, 6–2
2008	(United States) Julie Ditty (United States) Carly Gullickson	(Argentina) Jorgelina Cravero (Argentina) Betina Jozami	6–3, 6–4
2007	(Hungary) Melinda Czink (United States) Angela Haynes	(Latvia) Līga Dekmeijere (United States) Varvara Lepchenko	7–5, 6–4
2006	(United States) Julie Ditty (Venezuela) Milagros Sequera	(United States) Christina Fusano (United States) Aleke Tsoubanos	6–1, 6–4
2005	(United States) Julie Ditty (Venezuela) Milagros Sequera	(Indonesia) Romana Tedjakusuma (Thailand) Napaporn Tongsalee	6–3, 6–7^{(6–8)}, 7–6^{(7–2)}
2004	(Canada) Maureen Drake (United States) Carly Gullickson	(Canada) Stéphanie Dubois (Argentina) María Emilia Salerni	6–3, 7–6^{(8–6)}
2003	(United States) Samantha Reeves (Venezuela) Milagros Sequera	(United States) Amanda Augustus (Canada) Mélanie Marois	6–3, 6–2
2002	(Italy) Francesca Lubiani (Venezuela) Milagros Sequera	(Ukraine) Tatiana Perebiynis (Australia) Christina Wheeler	1–6, 7–5, 7–5
2001	(United States) Marissa Irvin (United States) Katie Schlukebir	(Australia) Lisa McShea (Japan) Nana Miyagi	6–4, 1–6, 6–4
2000	(United States) Brie Rippner (Ukraine) Elena Tatarkova	(Australia) Lisa McShea (India) Nirupama Sanjeev	6–4, 6–4
1999	(United States) Debbie Graham (Japan) Nana Miyagi	(Austria) Marion Maruska (India) Nirupama Sanjeev	6–4, 7–5
1998	(Australia) Rachel McQuillan (Japan) Nana Miyagi	(United States) Erika deLone (Australia) Nicole Pratt	7–6, 6–2
