= Asia Muhammad =

American tennis player (born 1991)

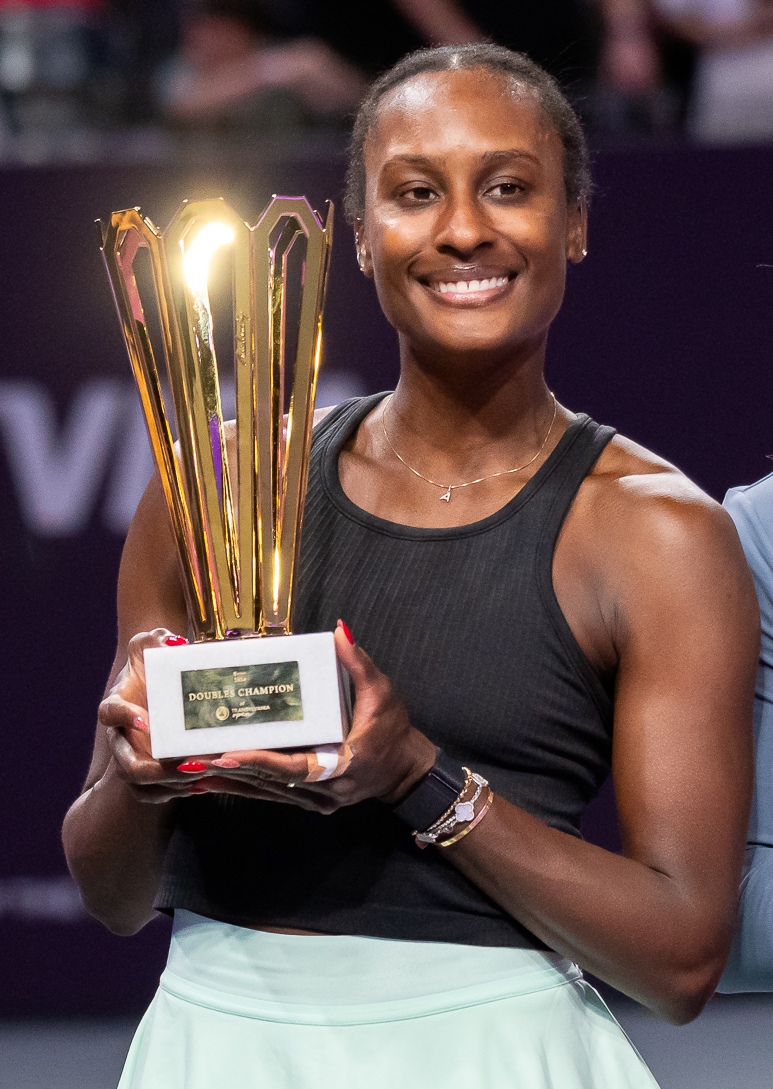
- Muhammad at the 2024 Transylvania Open
- Country (sports): United States
- Residence: Las Vegas, Nevada, US
- Born: April 4, 1991 (age 35) Long Beach, California, US
- Height: 5 ft 10 in (1.78 m)
- Turned pro: 2006
- Plays: Right (two-handed backhand)
- Coach: Tim Blenkiron
- Prize money: US$ 3,259,208

Singles
- Career record: 346–290
- Career titles: 0 WTA, 14 ITF
- Highest ranking: No. 124 (April 24, 2017)

Grand Slam singles results
- Australian Open: Q3 (2023)
- French Open: Q2 (2020, 2021)
- Wimbledon: Q3 (2017)
- US Open: 1R (2008, 2018, 2020)

Doubles
- Career record: 494–292
- Career titles: 13
- Highest ranking: No. 8 (March 17, 2025)
- Current ranking: No. 50 (September 21, 2026)

Grand Slam doubles results
- Australian Open: 3R (2019, 2025, 2026)
- French Open: QF (2020)
- Wimbledon: 3R (2021, 2022, 2024, 2026)
- US Open: SF (2020)

Grand Slam mixed doubles results
- Australian Open: QF (2025)
- French Open: SF (2026)
- Wimbledon: 2R (2019, 2021, 2024, 2025)
- US Open: 1R (2014, 2019, 2021, 2023, 2024)
- Last updated on: September 22, 2026.

Asia Muhammad (born April 4, 1991) is an American tennis player who specializes in doubles, and has been ranked as high as world No. 8 by the WTA, achieved in March 2025. Muhammad has won 13 doubles titles on the WTA Tour, including two WTA 1000 titles, 2024 at Cincinnati with Erin Routliffe and 2025 at Indian Wells with Demi Schuurs.

She also reached the finals of the 2022 Indian Wells Open with Ena Shibahara and the 2024 Wuhan Open with Jessica Pegula. In addition, Muhammad has won five doubles titles on the Challenger Tour and thirty-five on the ITF Circuit. In singles, she has a career-high of 124, achieved in April 2017, and has won 14 ITF titles.

== Early and personal life ==
Muhammad was born in Long Beach, California, to Ron Holmes and Faye Muhammad. Ron Holmes was point guard for the USC Trojans men's basketball program in the 1980s. Her mother, Faye, was a point guard and track athlete at Long Beach State. She is also the oldest of three children. One brother, Shabazz Muhammad, is a professional basketball player, who played for five seasons in the NBA. An uncle, Stephone Paige, played nine seasons in the National Football League (NFL) with 377 career receptions. Her aunt, Robin Holmes-Sullivan, was a four-year starter for Cal State Fullerton's basketball team.

In 2020, she got engaged to Australian tennis player Dayne Kelly. In 2022, she and Kelly annulled their marriage. In 2025, she got engaged to her boyfriend, James Cross. The couple married in 2026.

== Career ==
=== Juniors ===
Muhammad has been training at the No Quit Tennis Academy with Tim Blenkiron. He started coaching her when she was a child in Andre Agassi's Team Agassi tennis and education program in Las Vegas, where she developed into a top junior player. Her first big break was reaching the finals of the Tennis Channel Open at the age of 16.

=== Professional tour ===
Muhammad reached the semifinals of a major at the 2020 US Open and won two WTA 500 titles, at the 2023 Adelaide International 1 and the 2024 Washington Open, all partnering with Taylor Townsend. As a result, she reached a new career-high doubles ranking of world No. 24 on 12 August 2024. After winning her biggest title at the WTA 1000 2024 Cincinnati Open with Erin Routliffe, Muhammad reached the top 20. She also reached the final at the WTA 1000 2024 Wuhan Open with Jessica Pegula and finished the season ranked No. 15. Following three round of 16 showings at the 2025 Australian Open, at the 2025 Qatar Ladies Open, and the 2025 Dubai Open with new partner Demi Schuurs, Muhammad reached the top 10 on 24 February 2025. Again with partner Schuurs, she reached the final of the 2025 Indian Wells Open, defeating top seeds world No. 1, Kateřina Siniaková, and world No. 2, Taylor Townsend. They won the title defeating the Slovak-British duo of Tereza Mihalíková and Olivia Nicholls.

== Performance timelines ==
Key
W	F	SF	QF	#R	RR	Q#	P#	DNQ	A	Z#	PO	G	S	B	NMS	NTI	P	NH

(W) winner; (F) finalist; (SF) semifinalist; (QF) quarterfinalist; (#R) rounds 4, 3, 2, 1; (RR) round-robin stage; (Q#) qualification round; (P#) preliminary round; (DNQ) did not qualify; (A) absent; (Z#) Davis/Fed Cup Zonal Group (with number indication) or (PO) play-off; (G) gold, (S) silver or (B) bronze Olympic/Paralympic medal; (NMS) not a Masters tournament; (NTI) not a Tier I tournament; (P) postponed; (NH) not held; (SR) strike rate (events won / competed); (W–L) win–loss record.
To avoid confusion and double counting, these charts are updated at the conclusion of a tournament or when the player's participation has ended.

=== Doubles ===
Tournament	2008	2009	...	2014	2015	2016	2017	2018	2019	2020	2021	2022	2023	2024	2025	2026	SR	W–L
Grand Slam tournaments
Australian Open	A	A		A	A	A	1R	A	3R	2R	1R	2R	2R	1R	3R	3R	0 / 9	9–9
French Open	A	A		A	A	1R	1R	A	1R	QF	2R	3R	3R	2R	3R	1R	0 / 10	11–10
Wimbledon	A	A		A	A	A	1R	1R	1R	NH	3R	3R	1R	3R	2R	3R	0 / 9	9–9
US Open	1R	1R		1R	2R	QF	2R	3R	1R	SF	1R	3R	1R	3R	QF	2R	0 / 15	18–15
Win–loss	0–1	0–1		0–1	1–1	3–2	1–4	2–2	2–4	7–3	3–4	7–4	3–4	5–4	8–4	5–4	0 / 43	47–43
WTA 1000
Qatar Open																1R	0 / 1	0–1
Dubai																1R	0 / 1	0–1
Indian Wells	A	A		A	A	A	1R	A	QF	NH	2R	F	1R	SF	W	1R	1 / 8	14–7
Miami Open	A	A		A	A	A	1R	A	1R	NH	QF	2R	2R	SF	1R	QF	0 / 8	9–8
Madrid Open	A	A		A	A	A	1R	A	A	NH	A	A	A	1R	1R	1R	0 / 4	0–4
Italian Open	A	A		A	A	A	A	A	A	QF	2R	A	1R	1R		QF	0 / 5	5–5
Canadian Open	A	A		A	A	SF	1R	A	1R	NH	A	2R	A	2R		2R	0 / 6	5–6
Cincinnati	NMS	A		A	A	A	A	A	A	2R	A	A	2R	W		1R	1 / 4	5–3
Guadalajara	NH											A	SF	NMS			0 / 1	3–1
China Open	A									NH			A	1R			0 / 1	0–1
Wuhan	A									NH				F			0 / 1	4–1
Year-end ranking	660	420		127	89	46	108	62	55	36	44	28	50	15	19			

=== Mixed doubles ===
Tournament	2014	...	2017	2018	2019	2020	2021	2022	2023	2024	2025	2026	SR	W–L
Australian Open	A		A	A	A	A	1R	1R	A	A	QF	2R	0 / 4	3–4
French Open	A		A	A	2R	NH	A	1R	QF	2R	1R	SF	0 / 6	6–6
Wimbledon	A		1R	A	2R	NH	2R	1R	A	2R	2R	A	0 / 6	4–6
US Open	1R		A	A	1R	NH	1R	A	1R	1R	A	A	0 / 5	0–5
Win–loss	0–1		0–1	0–0	2–3	0–0	1–3	0–3	2–2	2–3	3–3	3–2	0 / 21	13–21

== Significant finals ==
=== WTA 1000 tournaments ===
==== Doubles: 4 (2 titles, 2 runner-ups) ====
Result	Date	Tournament	Surface	Partner	Opponents	Score
Loss	2022	Indian Wells Open	Hard	(Japan) Ena Shibahara	(China) Xu Yifan (China) Yang Zhaoxuan	5–7, 6–7^{(4–7)}
Win	2024	Cincinnati Open	Hard	(New Zealand) Erin Routliffe	(Canada) Leylah Fernandez (Kazakhstan) Yulia Putintseva	3–6, 6–1, [10–4]
Loss	2024	Wuhan Open	Hard	(United States) Jessica Pegula	(Russia) Irina Khromacheva (Kazakhstan) Anna Danilina	3–6, 6–7^{(6–8)}
Win	2025	Indian Wells Open	Hard	(Netherlands) Demi Schuurs	(Slovakia) Tereza Mihalíková (United Kingdom) Olivia Nicholls	6–2, 7–6^{(7–4)}

== WTA Tour finals ==
=== Doubles: 17 (13 titles, 4 runner-ups) ===
Legend WTA Finals (–) WTA 1000 (2–2) WTA 500 (3–1) WTA 250 (Note: The WTA International tournaments were reclassified as WTA 250 tournaments in 2021.) (8–1)	Finals by surface Hard (10–3) Clay (0–1) Grass (2–0) Carpet (1–0)

Result	W–L	Date	Tournament	Tier	Surface	Partner	Opponents	Score
Win	1–0	Jun 2015	Rosmalen Open, Netherlands	International	Grass	(Germany) Laura Siegemund	(Serbia) Jelena Janković (Russia) Anastasia Pavlyuchenkova	6–3, 7–5
Win	2–0	Sep 2016	Guangzhou Open, China	International	Hard	(China) Peng Shuai	(Belarus) Olga Govortsova (Belarus) Vera Lapko	6–2, 7–6^{(7–3)}
Win	3–0	Sep 2018	Tournoi de Québec, Canada	International	Carpet (i)	(United States) Maria Sanchez	(Croatia) Darija Jurak (Switzerland) Xenia Knoll	6–4, 6–3
Win	4–0	Apr 2019	Monterrey Open, Mexico	International	Hard	(United States) Maria Sanchez	(Australia) Monique Adamczak (Australia) Jessica Moore	7–6^{(7–2)}, 6–4
Win	5–0	Jan 2020	Auckland Open, New Zealand	International	Hard	(United States) Taylor Townsend	(United States) Serena Williams (Denmark) Caroline Wozniacki	6–4, 6–4
Win	6–0	Mar 2021	Monterrey Open, Mexico (2)	WTA 250	Hard	(United States) Caroline Dolehide	(United Kingdom) Heather Watson (China) Zheng Saisai	6–2, 6–3
Win	7–0	Jan 2022	Melbourne Summer Set, Australia	WTA 250	Hard	(United States) Jessica Pegula	(Italy) Sara Errani (Italy) Jasmine Paolini	6–3, 6–1
Loss	7–1	Mar 2022	Indian Wells Open, US	WTA 1000	Hard	(Japan) Ena Shibahara	(China) Xu Yifan (China) Yang Zhaoxuan	5–7, 6–7^{(4–7)}
Loss	7–2	Sep 2022	Korea Open, South Korea	WTA 250	Hard	(United States) Sabrina Santamaria	(France) Kristina Mladenovic (Belgium) Yanina Wickmayer	3–6, 2–6
Win	8–2	Jan 2023	Adelaide International, Australia	WTA 500	Hard	(United States) Taylor Townsend	(Australia) Storm Hunter (Czech Republic) Kateřina Siniaková	6–2, 7–6^{(7–2)}
Win	9–2	Feb 2024	Transylvania Open, Romania	WTA 250	Hard (i)	(United States) Caty McNally	(United Kingdom) Harriet Dart (Slovakia) Tereza Mihalíková	6–3, 6–4
Loss	9–3	May 2024	Internationaux de Strasbourg, France	WTA 500	Clay	(Indonesia) Aldila Sutjiadi	(Spain) Cristina Bucșa (Romania) Monica Niculescu	6–3, 4–6, [6–10]
Win	10–3	Aug 2024	Washington Open, US	WTA 500	Hard	(United States) Taylor Townsend	(China) Jiang Xinyu (Chinese Taipei) Wu Fang-hsien	7–6^{(7–0)}, 6–3
Win	11–3	Aug 2024	Cincinnati Open, US	WTA 1000	Hard	(New Zealand) Erin Routliffe	(Canada) Leylah Fernandez (Kazakhstan) Yulia Putintseva	3–6, 6–1, [10–4]
Loss	11–4	Oct 2024	Wuhan Open, China	WTA 1000	Hard	(United States) Jessica Pegula	(Russia) Irina Khromacheva (Kazakhstan) Anna Danilina	3–6, 6–7^{(6–8)}
Win	12–4	Mar 2025	Indian Wells Open, US	WTA 1000	Hard	(Netherlands) Demi Schuurs	(Slovakia) Tereza Mihalíková (United Kingdom) Olivia Nicholls	6–2, 7–6^{(7–4)}
Win	13–4	Jun 2025	Queen's Club Championships, UK	WTA 500	Grass	(Netherlands) Demi Schuurs	(Kazakhstan) Anna Danilina (Russia) Diana Shnaider	7–5, 6–7^{(3–7)}, [10–4]

== WTA 125 finals ==
=== Doubles: 9 (5 titles, 4 runner-ups) ===
Result	W–L	Date	Tournament	Surface	Partner	Opponents	Score
Loss	0–1	Nov 2016	Hawaii Open, United States	Hard	(United States) Nicole Gibbs	(Japan) Eri Hozumi (Japan) Miyu Kato	7–6^{(7–3)}, 3–6, [8–10]
Loss	0–2	Nov 2017	Hawaii Open, United States	Hard	(Japan) Eri Hozumi	(Chinese Taipei) Hsieh Shu-ying (Chinese Taipei) Hsieh Su-wei	1–6, 6–7^{(3–7)}
Loss	0–3	Sep 2018	Chicago Challenger, United States	Hard	(United States) Maria Sanchez	(Germany) Mona Barthel (Czech Republic) Kristýna Plíšková	3–6, 2–6
Win	1–3	Mar 2020	Indian Wells Challenger, United States	Hard	(United States) Taylor Townsend	(United States) Caty McNally (United States) Jessica Pegula	6–4, 6–4
Win	2–3	Nov 2021	Midland Tennis Classic, United States	Hard (i)	(United Kingdom) Harriet Dart	(Thailand) Peangtarn Plipuech (Indonesia) Aldila Sutjiadi	6–3, 2–6, [10–7]
Win	3–3	Aug 2022	Vancouver Open, Canada	Hard	(Japan) Miyu Kato	(Hungary) Tímea Babos (United States) Angela Kulikov	6–3, 7–5
Win	4–3	Nov 2022	Midland Tennis Classic, United States (2)	Hard (i)	(United States) Alycia Parks	(Germany) Anna-Lena Friedsam (Ukraine) Nadiia Kichenok	6–2, 6–3
Loss	4–4	May 2023	Firenze Ladies Open, Italy	Clay	(Mexico) Giuliana Olmos	(Germany) Vivian Heisen (Estonia) Ingrid Neel	6–1, 2–6, [8–10]
Win	5–4	May 2024	Clarins Open, France	Clay	(Indonesia) Aldila Sutjiadi	(Romania) Monica Niculescu (China) Zhu Lin	7–6^{(7–3)}, 4–6, [11–9]

== ITF Circuit finals ==
=== Singles: 18 (14 titles, 4 runner-ups) ===
Legend $50/60,000 tournaments (4–2) $25,000 tournaments (9–2) $10,000 tournaments (1–0)	Finals by surface Hard (13–4) Clay (1–0)

Result	W–L	Date	Tournament	Tier	Surface	Opponent	Score
Win	1–0	Jun 2007	ITF Houston, United States	10,000	Hard (i)	(Croatia) Jelena Pandžić	6–3, 4–6, 6–4
W	1–1	Mar 2008	Las Vegas Open, United States	50,000	Hard	(France) Camille Pin	4–6, 1–6
Win	2–1	May 2013	ITF Raleigh, United States	25,000	Clay	(United States) Chalena Scholl	6–2, 6–2
Win	3–1	Nov 2015	Canberra International, Australia	50,000	Hard	(Japan) Eri Hozumi	6–4, 6–3
Loss	3–2	Oct 2016	Bendigo International, Australia	50,000	Hard	(Japan) Risa Ozaki	3–6, 3–6
Win	4–2	Feb 2017	Burnie International, Australia	60,000	Hard	(Australia) Arina Rodionova	6–2, 6–1
Loss	4–3	Oct 2017	Brisbane QTC International, Australia	25,000	Hard	(Australia) Kimberly Birrell	6–4, 3–6, 2–6
Loss	4–4	Feb 2018	Launceston International, Australia	25,000	Hard	(United Kingdom) Gabriella Taylor	3–6, 4–6
Win	5–4	Feb 2018	Rancho Santa Fe Open, United States	25,000	Hard	(Japan) Kurumi Nara	6–4, 2–6, 7–6^{(3)}
Win	6–4	Aug 2018	Lexington Challenger, United States	60,000	Hard	(United States) Ann Li	7–5, 6–1
Win	7–4	Sep 2018	ITF Templeton Pro, United States	60,000	Hard	(Bulgaria) Sesil Karatantcheva	2–6, 6–4, 6–3
Win	8–4	Sep 2019	ITF Cairns, Australia	W25	Hard	(Slovakia) Zuzana Zlochová	6–2, 6–2
Win	9–4	Oct 2019	Brisbane QTC International, Australia	W25	Hard	(Australia) Maddison Inglis	6–3, 3–6, 6–3
Win	10–4	Feb 2020	Launceston International, Australia	W25	Hard	(Australia) Destanee Aiava	6–4, 6–3
Win	11–4	Feb 2022	ITF Canberra, Australia	W25	Hard	(Australia) Priscilla Hon	6–7^{(6)}, 6–3, 6–2
Win	12–4	Feb 2022	ITF Canberra, Australia	W25	Hard	(Australia) Arina Rodionova	6–1, 7–6^{(7)}
Win	13–4	Mar 2022	Bendigo International, Australia	W25	Hard	(Australia) Olivia Gadecki	6–2, 6–4
Win	14–4	Jul 2023	ITF Roehampton, United Kingdom	W25	Hard	(South Korea) Park So-hyun	6–2, 1–0 ret.

=== Doubles: 55 (35 titles, 20 runner-ups) ===
Legend $100,000 tournaments (3–2) $75/80,000 tournaments (5–1) $50/60,000 tournaments (18–9) $25,000 tournaments (9–8)	Finals by surface Hard (21–9) Clay (11–9) Grass (1–2) Carpet (2–0)

Result	W–L	Date	Tournament	Tier	Surface	Partner	Opponents	Score
Loss	0–1	Jun 2009	ITF Szczecin, Poland	25,000	Clay	(United States) Christina McHale	(Czech Republic) Michaela Paštiková (Slovakia) Lenka Tvarošková	2–6, 5–7
Loss	0–2	Apr 2010	Osprey Challenger, US	25,000	Clay	(United States) Madison Brengle	(Argentina) María Irigoyen (Argentina) Florencia Molinero	1–6, 6–7^{(3)}
Win	1–2	Oct 2010	Tennis Classic of Troy, United States	50,000	Hard	(United States) Madison Brengle	(Russia) Alina Jidkova (Germany) Laura Siegemund	6–2, 6–4
Loss	1–3	May 2011	Raleigh Challenger, US	50,000	Clay	(United States) Beatrice Capra	(Canada) Marie-Ève Pelletier (Canada) Sharon Fichman	1–6, 3–6
Win	2–3	May 2011	Carson Challenger, US	50,000	Hard	(United States) Alexandra Mueller	(United States) Christina Fusano (United States) Yasmin Schnack	6–2, 6–3
Win	3–3	Jul 2011	Waterloo Challenger, Canada	50,000	Clay	(United States) Alexandra Mueller	(Canada) Eugenie Bouchard (United States) Megan Moulton-Levy	6–3, 3–6, [10–7]
Win	4–3	Sep 2011	Albuquerque Championships, US	75,000	Hard	(United States) Alexa Glatch	(United States) Grace Min (United States) Melanie Oudin	4–6, 6–3, [10–2]
Loss	4–4	May 2012	Raleigh Challenger, US	25,000	Clay	(United States) Alexandra Mueller	(Canada) Gabriela Dabrowski (Canada) Marie-Ève Pelletier	4–6, 6–4, [5–10]
Win	5–4	Jun 2012	Sacramento Challenger, US	50,000	Hard	(United States) Yasmin Schnack	(United States) Kaitlyn Christian (United States) Maria Sanchez	6–3, 7–6^{(4)}
Win	6–4	Sep 2012	Albuquerque Championships, US	75,000	Hard	(United States) Yasmin Schnack	(United States) Irina Falconi (United States) Maria Sanchez	6–2, 1–6, [12–10]
Win	7–4	Feb 2013	Rancho Santa Fe Open, US	25,000	Hard	(United States) Allie Will	(United States) Anamika Bhargava (United States) Macall Harkins	6–1, 6–4
Loss	7–5	May 2013	ITF Indian Harbour Beach, US	50,000	Clay	(United States) Allie Will	(United States) Jan Abaza (United States) Louisa Chirico	4–6, 4–6
Win	8–5	May 2013	Raleigh Challenger, US	25,000	Clay	(United States) Allie Will	(Australia) Jessica Moore (Australia) Sally Peers	6–3, 6–3
Loss	8–6	Jun 2013	Open de Marseille, France	100,000	Clay	(United States) Allie Will	(Austria) Sandra Klemenschits (Slovenia) Andreja Klepač	6–1, 4–6, [5–10]
Loss	8–7	Oct 2013	ITF Rock Hill, US	25,000	Hard	(United States) Allie Kiick	(Colombia) Mariana Duque-Marino (Argentina) María Irigoyen	6–4, 6–7^{(5)}, [10–12]
Loss	8–8	Nov 2013	ITF New Braunfels, US	50,000	Hard	(United States) Taylor Townsend	(Georgia (country)) Anna Tatishvili (United States) CoCo Vandeweghe	6–3, 3–6, [11–13]
Loss	8–9	Jan 2014	ITF Daytona Beach, US	25,000	Clay	(United States) Allie Will	(United States) Nicole Melichar (Serbia) Teodora Mirčić	7–6^{(5)}, 6–7^{(1)}, [1–10]
Win	9–9	Apr 2014	Charlottesville Open, US	50,000	Clay	(United States) Taylor Townsend	(United States) Irina Falconi (United States) Maria Sanchez	6–3, 6–1
Win	10–9	May 2014	ITF Indian Harbour Beach, US	50,000	Clay	(United States) Taylor Townsend	(United States) Jan Abaza (United States) Sanaz Marand	6–2, 6–1
Loss	10–10	Jun 2014	ITF Brescia, Italy	25,000	Clay	(United States) Louisa Chirico	(United States) Sanaz Marand (Argentina) Florencia Molinero	4–6, 6–4, [8–10]
Win	11–10	Aug 2014	Vancouver Open, Canada	100,000	Hard	(United States) Maria Sanchez	(United States) Jamie Loeb (United States) Allie Will	6–3, 1–6, [10–8]
Loss	11–11	Sep 2014	Las Vegas Open, US	50,000	Hard	(United States) Maria Sanchez	(Paraguay) Verónica Cepede Royg (Argentina) María Irigoyen	3–6, 7–5, [9–11]
Loss	11–12	Nov 2014	ITF Captiva Island, US	50,000	Hard	(United States) Maria Sanchez	(Canada) Gabriela Dabrowski (United States) Anna Tatishvili	3–6, 3–6
Win	12–12	Jan 2015	ITF Plantation, US	25,000	Clay	(Russia) Irina Khromacheva	(United States) Jan Abaza (United States) Sanaz Marand	6–2, 6–2
Win	13–12	Feb 2015	Rancho Santa Fe Open, US	25,000	Hard	(United States) Samantha Crawford	(Turkey) İpek Soylu (Serbia) Nina Stojanović	6–0, 6–3
Loss	13–13	Oct 2015	ITF Cairns, Australia	25,000	Hard	(United States) Jennifer Elie	(Australia) Jessica Moore (Australia) Storm Sanders	0–6, 3–6
Win	14–13	Oct 2015	Brisbane QTC International, Australia	25,000	Hard	(United States) Lauren Embree	(Thailand) Noppawan Lertcheewakarn (Thailand) Varatchaya Wongteanchai	6–2, 4–6, [11–9]
Loss	14–14	Nov 2015	Canberra International, Australia	50,000	Hard	(United States) Lauren Embree	(Japan) Misa Eguchi (Japan) Eri Hozumi	6–7^{(13)}, 6–1, [12–14]
Win	15–14	Nov 2015	Bendigo International, Australia	50,000	Hard	(United States) Lauren Embree	(Russia) Natela Dzalamidze (Japan) Hiroko Kuwata	7–5, 6–3
Win	16–14	Jan 2016	Championships of Maui, US	50,000	Hard	(United States) Maria Sanchez	(United States) Jessica Pegula (United States) Taylor Townsend	6–2, 3–6, [10–6]
Win	17–14	Feb 2016	Rancho Santa Fe Open, US	25,000	Hard	(United States) Taylor Townsend	(United States) Jessica Pegula (Canada) Carol Zhao	6–3, 6–4
Win	18–14	Apr 2016	Osprey Challenger, US	50,000	Clay	(United States) Taylor Townsend	(United States) Louisa Chirico (United States) Katerina Stewart	6–1, 6–7^{(5)}, [10–4]
Win	19–14	Apr 2016	ITF Pelham, US	25,000	Clay	(United States) Taylor Townsend	(United States) Sophie Chang (United States) Caitlin Whoriskey	6–2, 6–3
Win	20–14	Apr 2016	Dothan Pro Classic, US	50,000	Clay	(United States) Taylor Townsend	(United States) Caitlin Whoriskey (United States) Keri Wong	6–0, 6–1
Win	21–14	Apr 2016	Charlottesville Open, US	50,000	Clay	(United States) Taylor Townsend	(Russia) Alexandra Panova (United States) Shelby Rogers	7–6^{(4)}, 6–0
Loss	21–15	Jun 2016	Eastbourne Trophy, UK	50,000	Grass	(United States) Maria Sanchez	(China) Yang Zhaoxuan (China) Zhang Kailin	6–7^{(5)}, 1–6
Win	22–15	Oct 2016	Bendigo International, Australia	50,000	Hard	(Australia) Arina Rodionova	(Japan) Shuko Aoyama (Japan) Risa Ozaki	6–4, 6–3
Win	23–15	Nov 2017	Canberra International, Australia	60,000	Hard	(Australia) Arina Rodionova	(Australia) Jessica Moore (Australia) Ellen Perez	6–4, 6–4
Loss	23–16	Nov 2017	Bendigo International, Australia	60,000	Hard	(Australia) Arina Rodionova	(Australia) Alison Bai (Australia) Zoe Hives	6–4, 4–6, [8–10]
Win	24–16	May 2018	Fukuoka International, Japan	60,000	Carpet	(United Kingdom) Naomi Broady	(United Kingdom) Tara Moore (Switzerland) Amra Sadiković	6–2, 6–0
Win	25–16	May 2018	Kurume Cup, Japan	60,000	Carpet	(United Kingdom) Naomi Broady	(United Kingdom) Katy Dunne (Papua New Guinea) Abigail Tere-Apisah	6–2, 6–4
Loss	25–17	Jun 2018	Manchester Trophy, UK	100,000	Grass	(United Kingdom) Naomi Broady	(Thailand) Luksika Kumkhum (India) Prarthana Thombare	6–7^{(5)}, 3–6
Win	26–17	Jun 2018	Ilkley Trophy, UK	100,000	Grass	(United States) Maria Sanchez	(Russia) Natela Dzalamidze (Kazakhstan) Galina Voskoboeva	4–6, 6–3, [10–1]
Win	27–17	Jul 2018	Berkeley Challenge, US	60,000	Hard	(United States) Nicole Gibbs	(Australia) Ellen Perez (United States) Sabrina Santamaria	6–4, 6–1
Win	28–17	Sep 2018	ITF Templeton Pro, US	60,000	Hard	(United States) Maria Sanchez	(United States) Quinn Gleason (Brazil) Luisa Stefani	6–7, 6–2, [10–8]
Win	29–17	Nov 2018	Tyler Pro Challenge, US	80,000	Hard	(United States) Nicole Gibbs	(United States) Desirea Krawczyk (Mexico) Giuliana Olmos	3–6, 6–3, [14–12]
Win	30–17	Nov 2018	Las Vegas Open, US	80,000	Hard	(United States) Maria Sanchez	(United States) Sophie Chang (United States) Alexandra Mueller	6–3, 6–4
Win	31–17	Apr 2019	Charlottesville Open, US	W80	Clay	(United States) Taylor Townsend	(Czech Republic) Lucie Hradecká (Poland) Katarzyna Kawa	4–6, 7–5, [10–3]
Win	32–17	May 2019	ITF Charleston Pro, US	W100	Clay	(United States) Taylor Townsend	(United States) Madison Brengle (United States) Lauren Davis	6–2, 6–2
Loss	32–18	Sep 2019	ITF Cairns, Australia	W25	Hard	(Australia) Maddison Inglis	(New Zealand) Emily Fanning (Australia) Abbie Myers	6–2, 6–7^{(2)}, [7–10]
Win	33–18	Nov 2019	Playford International, Australia	W60	Hard	(Australia) Storm Sanders	(United Kingdom) Naiktha Bains (Slovakia) Tereza Mihalikova	6–3, 6–4
Loss	33–19	Jan 2020	Burnie International, Australia	W60	Hard	(United States) Desirae Krawczyk	(New Zealand) Ellen Perez (Australia) Storm Sanders	3–6, 2–6
Win	34–19	Feb 2022	ITF Canberra, Australia	W25	Hard	(Australia) Arina Rodionova	(New Zealand) Alison Bai (Australia) Jaimee Fourlis	6–3, 3–6, [10–6]
Win	35–19	Feb 2022	ITF Canberra, Australia	W25	Hard	(Australia) Arina Rodionova	(New Zealand) Alison Bai (Australia) Jaimee Fourlis	7–6^{(2)}, 7–6^{(5)}
Loss	35–20	Apr 2023	Zaragoza Open, Spain	W80	Clay	(United Kingdom) Eden Silva	(France) Diane Parry (Netherlands) Arantxa Rus	1–6, 6–4, [5–10]
