= CoCo Vandeweghe career statistics =

Career finals
Discipline	Type	Won	Lost	Total	WR (Note: Winning rate)
Singles	Grand Slam	–	–	–	–
Singles	Summer Olympics	–	–	–	–
Singles	WTA Finals (Note: Formerly known as: Virginia Slims Championships (until 1995); WTA Tour Championships (until 2014))	–	–	–	–
Singles	WTA Elite (Note: Elite tier: WTA Tournament of Champions (2009–14); WTA Elite Trophy (2015–present))	0	1	1	0.00
Singles	WTA 1000 (Note: Formerly known as: Category 4 & 5 & 6 (until 1990); Tier I (until 2009); WTA Premier Mandatory and 5 (until 2021))	–	–	–	–
Singles	WTA 500 (Note: Formerly known as: Category 3 (until 1990); Tier II (until 2009); WTA Premier (until 2021))	0	3	3	0.00
Singles	WTA 250 (Note: Formerly known as: Category 1 & 2 (until 1990); Tier III & IV & V (until 2009); WTA International (until 2021))	2	0	2	1.00
Singles	Total	2	4	6	0.33
Doubles	Grand Slam	1	0	1	1.00
Doubles	Summer Olympics	–	–	–	–
Doubles	WTA Finals	–	–	–	–
Doubles	WTA Elite	–	–	–	–
Doubles	WTA 1000	2	1	3	0.66
Doubles	WTA 500	1	2	3	0.33
Doubles	WTA 250	–	–	–	–
Doubles	Total	4	3	7	0.57
Total		6	7	13	0.46

This is a list of career statistics of American tennis player CoCo Vandeweghe since her professional debut in 2008. Vandeweghe won two singles and four doubles titles on WTA Tour, one singles and one doubles WTA Challenger, as well as two ITF singles and six ITF doubles tournaments. In 2018, she won her first major title, partnering Ashleigh Barty in women's doubles at the US Open. She also reached two Grand Slam mixed-doubles finals in 2016, at the Australian Open and the US Open.

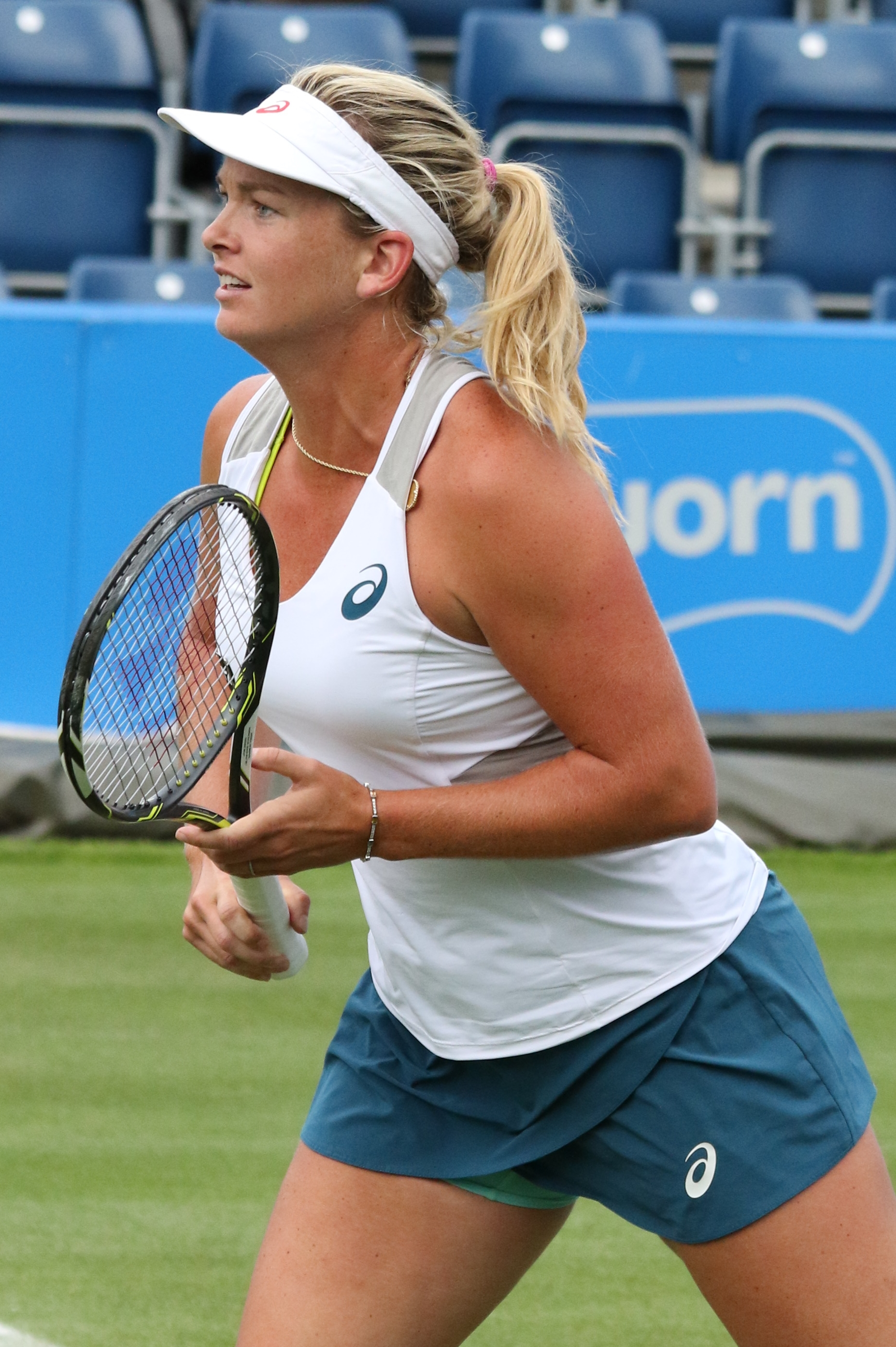
Vandeweghe at the 2016 Birmingham Classic

== Performance timelines ==
Key
W	F	SF	QF	#R	RR	Q#	P#	DNQ	A	Z#	PO	G	S	B	NMS	NTI	P	NH

(W) winner; (F) finalist; (SF) semifinalist; (QF) quarterfinalist; (#R) rounds 4, 3, 2, 1; (RR) round-robin stage; (Q#) qualification round; (P#) preliminary round; (DNQ) did not qualify; (A) absent; (Z#) Davis/Fed Cup Zonal Group (with number indication) or (PO) play-off; (G) gold, (S) silver or (B) bronze Olympic/Paralympic medal; (NMS) not a Masters tournament; (NTI) not a Tier I tournament; (P) postponed; (NH) not held; (SR) strike rate (events won / competed); (W–L) win–loss record.
To avoid confusion and double counting, these charts are updated at the conclusion of a tournament or when the player's participation has ended.

Only main-draw results in WTA Tour, Grand Slam tournaments, Billie Jean King Cup (Fed Cup), Hopman Cup, United Cup and Olympic Games are included in win–loss records.

=== Singles ===
Tournament	2006	2007	2008	2009	2010	2011	2012	2013	2014	2015	2016	2017	2018	2019	2020	2021	2022	2023	SR	W–L	Win %
Grand Slam tournaments
Australian Open	A	A	A	A	1R	1R	Q1	1R	Q1	3R	1R	SF	1R	A	1R	A	Q1	1R	0 / 9	7–9	44%
French Open	A	A	A	A	A	1R	Q2	1R	2R	1R	2R	1R	2R	A	A	Q2	Q1	Q1	0 / 7	3–7	30%
Wimbledon	A	A	A	A	A	1R	1R	1R	2R	QF	4R	QF	1R	A	NH	2R	1R	Q3	0 / 10	13–10	57%
US Open	A	Q1	1R	Q1	1R	2R	1R	2R	2R	2R	1R	SF	1R	1R	A	1R	1R	Q1	0 / 13	9–13	41%
Win–loss	0–0	0–0	0–1	0–0	0–2	1–4	0–2	1–4	3–3	7–4	4–4	14–4	1–4	0–1	0–1	1–2	0–2	0–1	0 / 39	32–39	45%
Year-end championships
WTA Elite Trophy (Note: WTA Tournament of Champions was held from 2009 to 2014, when WTA Elite Trophy replaced it.)	NH									DNQ		F	DNQ		NH			DNQ	0 / 1	3–1	75%
National representation
Billie Jean King Cup (Note: Formerly known as Fed Cup until 2020.)	A	A	A	A	F	A	A	A	A	PO	PO	W	F	A	A	SF	A	A	1 / 4	8–4	67%
WTA 1000 + former^{†} tournaments
Dubai / Qatar Open (Note: The first Premier 5 event of the year has switched back and forth between the Dubai Tennis Championships and the Qatar Ladies Open since 2009. Dubai was classified as a Premier 5 event from 2009 to 2011 before being succeeded by Doha for the 2012–2014 period. In 2015, Dubai regained its Premier 5 status while Doha was demoted to Premier status. The Premier 5 tournaments were reclassified as WTA 1000 tournaments in 2021.)	NMS		A	A	A	A	A	A	A	1R	3R	1R	A	A	A	A	A	A	0 / 3	2–3	40%
Indian Wells Open	A	Q1	Q1	Q1	Q1	2R	1R	Q1	2R	3R	3R	2R	3R	A	NH	Q1	A	Q1	0 / 7	6–7	46%
Miami Open	A	A	1R	1R	Q2	1R	A	Q2	4R	1R	3R	2R	2R	A	NH	Q1	A	Q1	0 / 8	5–8	38%
Madrid Open	NH			A	A	Q2	A	A	A	2R	1R	QF	1R	A	NH	A	A	A	0 / 4	4–4	50%
Italian Open	A	A	A	A	A	Q1	A	A	A	A	1R	A	1R	A	A	A	A	A	0 / 2	0–2	0%
Canadian Open	A	A	A	A	A	A	A	A	QF	1R	A	1R	A	A	NH	A	A	A	0 / 3	3–3	50%
Cincinnati Open	NMS			A	1R	Q1	Q1	A	A	2R	2R	1R	1R	Q1	A	A	A	A	0 / 5	2–5	29%
Guadalajara Open	NH																Q2	A	0 / 0	0–0	–
Pan Pac. / Wuhan Open (Note: In 2014, the Pan Pacific Open was downgraded to a Premier event and replaced by the Wuhan Open. The Premier 5 tournaments were reclassified as WTA 1000 tournaments in 2021.)	A	A	A	A	QF	2R	Q1	A	3R	QF	1R	A	1R	A	NH				0 / 6	9–6	60%
China Open	NMS			A	A	Q1	A	A	1R	1R	1R	2R	1R	A	NH			A	0 / 5	1–5	17%
Southern California Open^{†}	1R	1R	NH / NMS																0 / 2	0–2	0%
Career statistics
	2006	2007	2008	2009	2010	2011	2012	2013	2014	2015	2016	2017	2018	2019	2020	2021	2022	2023	SR	W–L	Win %
Tournaments	1	1	3	2	6	13	7	11	15	21	19	18	16	3	2	9	5	2	Career total: 154		
Titles	0	0	0	0	0	0	0	0	1	0	1	0	0	0	0	0	0	0	Career total: 2		
Finals	0	0	0	0	0	0	1	0	1	0	1	2	1	0	0	0	0	0	Career total: 6		
Overall win–loss	0–1	0–1	0–3	1–2	6–8	8–13	6–7	5–11	22–14	20–22	23–18	35–18	10–17	1–3	0–2	4–9	4–5	1–2	2 / 154	146–156	48%
Win %	0%	0%	0%	33%	43%	38%	46%	31%	61%	48%	56%	66%	37%	25%	0%	31%	44%	33%	Career total: 48%		
Year-end ranking	–	746	405	354	114	127	95	110	40	37	37	10	104	332	213	173	126	414	$8,225,494		

=== Doubles ===
Tournament	2008	2009	2010	2011	2012	2013	2014	2015	2016	2017	2018	2019	2020	2021	2022	2023	SR	W–L	Win %
Grand Slam tournaments
Australian Open	A	A	A	A	A	A	A	1R	QF	2R	1R	A	A	A	A	A	0 / 4	3–4	43%
French Open	A	A	A	1R	A	A	A	1R	2R	1R	1R	A	A	1R	A	A	0 / 6	1–6	14%
Wimbledon	A	A	A	A	A	A	A	3R	A	1R	A	A	NH	1R	3R	A	0 / 4	4–4	50%
US Open	1R	A	2R	A	A	2R	2R	SF	SF	1R	W	1R	A	1R	1R	1R	1 / 12	17–11	61%
Win–loss	0–1	0–0	1–1	0–1	0–0	1–1	1–1	6–4	7–3	1–4	6–2	0–1	0–0	0–3	2–2	0–1	1 / 26	25–25	50%
National representation
Summer Olympics	A	NH			A	NH			2R	NH				A	NH		0 / 1	1–1	50%
Billie Jean King Cup	A	A	F	A	A	A	A	PO	PO	W	F	A	A	SF	A	A	1 / 4	5–4	56%
Year-end championships
WTA Finals	DNQ										SF	DNQ	NH	DNQ			0 / 1	1–1	50%
WTA 1000
Dubai / Qatar Open	A	A	A	A	A	A	A	A	1R	A	A	A	A	A	A	A	0 / 1	0–1	0%
Indian Wells Open	1R	A	A	A	A	A	A	2R	W	1R	1R	A	NH	A	A	A	1 / 5	6–4	60%
Miami Open	A	2R	A	A	A	A	A	A	1R	1R	W	A	NH	1R	A	A	1 / 5	6–4	60%
Madrid Open	NH	A	A	A	A	A	A	A	1R	A	QF	A	NH	A	A	A	0 / 2	2–2	50%
Cincinnati Open	NMS	A	A	A	A	A	A	QF	F	2R	A	SF	A	A	A	A	0 / 4	7–4	64%
Pan Pac. / Wuhan Open	A	A	A	A	A	A	A	1R	2R	A	2R	A	NH				0 / 3	0–3	0%
China Open	NMS	A	A	A	A	A	A	A	2R	1R	A	A	NH			A	0 / 2	1–2	33%
Career statistics
Titles	0	0	0	0	0	0	0	0	1	1	2	0	0	0	0	0	Career total: 4		
Finals	0	0	0	0	0	0	0	0	2	1	2	0	0	1	0	1	Career total: 7		
Year-end ranking	960	306	308	244	493	110	195	55	18	63	14	201	217	155	356	272			

=== Mixed doubles ===
Tournament	2011	...	2016	2017	2018	2019	...	2023	SR	W–L	Win %
Grand Slam tournaments
Australian Open	A		F	A	A	A		A	0 / 1	3–1	75%
French Open	A		QF	1R	1R	A		A	0 / 3	2–3	40%
Wimbledon	A		2R	A	A	A		A	0 / 1	0–1	0%
US Open	1R		F	SF	A	1R		A	0 / 4	7–4	64%
Win–loss	0–1		9–4	3–2	0–1	0–1		0–0	0 / 9	12–9	57%

== Grand Slams tournament finals ==
=== Doubles: 1 (title) ===
Result	Year	Championship	Surface	Partner	Opponents	Score
Win	2018	US Open	Hard	(Australia) Ashleigh Barty	(Hungary) Tímea Babos (France) Kristina Mladenovic	3–6, 7–6^{(7–2)}, 7–6^{(8–6)}

=== Mixed doubles: 2 (2 runner-ups) ===
Result	Year	Championship	Surface	Partner	Opponents	Score
Loss	2016	Australian Open	Hard	(Romania) Horia Tecău	(Russia) Elena Vesnina (Brazil) Bruno Soares	4–6, 6–4, [5–10]
Loss	2016	US Open	Hard	(United States) Rajeev Ram	(Germany) Laura Siegemund (Croatia) Mate Pavić	4–6, 4–6

== Other significant finals ==
=== WTA 1000 tournaments ===
==== Doubles: 3 (2 titles, 1 runner-up) ====
Result	Year	Tournament	Surface	Partner	Opponents	Score
Win	2016	Indian Wells Open	Hard	(United States) Bethanie Mattek-Sands	(Germany) Julia Görges (Czech Republic) Karolína Plíšková	4–6, 6–4, [10–6]
Loss	2016	Cincinnati Open	Hard	(Switzerland) Martina Hingis	(India) Sania Mirza (Czech Republic) Barbora Strýcová	5–7, 4–6
Win	2018	Miami Open	Hard	(Australia) Ashleigh Barty	(Czech Republic) Barbora Krejčíková (Czech Republic) Kateřina Siniaková	6–2, 6–1

=== WTA Elite Trophy ===
==== Singles: 1 (runner-up) ====
Result	Year	Venue	Surface	Opponent	Score
Loss	2017	WTA Elite Trophy, Zhuhai	Hard (i)	(Germany) Julia Görges	5–7, 1–6

== WTA Tour finals ==
=== Singles: 6 (2 titles, 4 runner–ups) ===
Legend Elite (0–1) WTA 500 (Premier) (0–3) WTA 250 (International) (2–0)	Finals by surface Hard (0–3) Grass (2–0) Clay (0–1)

Result	W–L	Date	Tournament	Tier	Surface	Opponent	Score
Loss	0–1	Jul 2012	Silicon Valley Classic, United States	Premier	Hard	(United States) Serena Williams	5–7, 3–6
Win	1–1	Jun 2014	Rosmalen Open, Netherlands	International	Grass	(China) Zheng Jie	6–2, 6–4
Win	2–1	Jun 2016	Rosmalen Open, Netherlands (2)	International	Grass	(France) Kristina Mladenovic	7–5, 7–5
Loss	2–2	Aug 2017	Silicon Valley Classic, United States	Premier	Hard	(United States) Madison Keys	6–7^{(4–7)}, 4–6
Loss	2–3	Nov 2017	WTA Elite Trophy, China	Elite	Hard (i)	(Germany) Julia Görges	5–7, 1–6
Loss	2–4	Apr 2018	Stuttgart Open, Germany	Premier	Clay (i)	(Czech Republic) Karolína Plíšková	6–7^{(2–7)}, 4–6

=== Doubles: 7 (4 titles, 3 runner–ups) ===
Legend Grand Slam tournaments (1–0) WTA 1000 (Premier 5 / Premier M) (2–1) WTA 500 (Premier) (1–2)	Finals by surface Hard (4–3) Grass (0–0) Clay (0–0)

Result	W–L	Date	Tournament	Tier	Surface	Partner	Opponents	Score
Win	1–0	Mar 2016	Indian Wells Open, United States	Premier M	Hard	(United States) Bethanie Mattek-Sands	(Germany) Julia Görges (Czech Republic) Karolína Plíšková	4–6, 6–4, [10–6]
Loss	1–1	Aug 2016	Cincinnati Open, United States	Premier 5	Hard	(Switzerland) Martina Hingis	(India) Sania Mirza (Czech Republic) Barbora Strýcová	5–7, 4–6
Win	2–1	Aug 2017	Silicon Valley Classic, United States	Premier	Hard	(United States) Abigail Spears	(France) Alizé Cornet (Poland) Alicja Rosolska	6–2, 6–3
Win	3–1	Apr 2018	Miami Open, United States	Premier M	Hard	(Australia) Ashleigh Barty	(Czech Republic) Barbora Krejčíková (Czech Republic) Kateřina Siniaková	6–2, 6–1
Win	4–1	Sep 2018	US Open, United States	Grand Slam	Hard	(Australia) Ashleigh Barty	(Hungary) Tímea Babos (France) Kristina Mladenovic	3–6, 7–6^{(7–2)}, 7–6^{(8–6)}
Loss	4–2	Oct 2021	Chicago Fall Classic, United States	WTA 500	Hard	(United States) Caroline Dolehide	(Czech Republic) Květa Peschke (Germany) Andrea Petkovic	3–6, 1–6
Loss	4–3	Sep 2023	Southern California Open, United States	WTA 500	Hard	(United States) Danielle Collins	(Czech Republic) Barbora Krejčíková (Czech Republic) Kateřina Siniaková	1–6, 4–6

== WTA Challenger finals ==
=== Singles: 2 (1 title, 1 runner-up) ===
Result	W–L	Date	Tournament	Surface	Opponent	Score
Loss	0–1	Nov 2019	Houston Challenger, United States	Hard	(Belgium) Kirsten Flipkens	6–7^{(4–7)}, 4–6
Win	1–1	Aug 2022	Concord Open, United States	Hard	(United States) Bernarda Pera	6–3, 5–7, 6–4

=== Doubles: 1 (title) ===
Result	W–L	Date	Tournament	Surface	Partner	Opponents	Score
Win	1–0	Aug 2022	Concord Open, United States	Hard	Varvara Flink	(Thailand) Peangtarn Plipuech (Japan) Moyuka Uchijima	6–3, 7–6^{(7–3)}

== ITF Circuit finals ==
=== Singles: 6 (2 titles, 4 runner–ups) ===
Legend
$75,000 tournaments (0–1)
$50/60,000 tournaments (1–3)
$25,000 tournaments (1–0)

Result	W–L	Date	Tournament	Tier	Surface	Opponent	Score
Win	1–0	May 2010	Carson Challenger, United States	50,000	Hard	(United States) Kristie Ahn	6–1, 6–3
Win	2–0	Jun 2010	ITF El Paso, United States	25,000	Hard	(Japan) Ryoko Fuda	6–2, 6–1
Loss	2–1	Jun 2012	Nottingham Trophy, United Kingdom	75,000	Grass	(Poland) Urszula Radwanska	1–6, 6–4, 1–6
Loss	2–2	Sep 2013	Las Vegas Open, United States	50,000	Hard	(United States) Melanie Oudin	7–5, 3–6, 3–6
Loss	2–3	Oct 2013	Saguenay Challenger, Canada	50,000	Hard	(Tunisia) Ons Jabeur	7–6^{(7–0)}, 3–6, 3–6
Loss	2–4	Sep 2019	ITF Templeton Pro, United States	60,000	Hard	(United States) Shelby Rogers	6–4, 2–6, 3–6

=== Doubles: 6 (6 titles) ===
Legend
$75,000 tournaments (2–0)
$50,000 tournaments (4–0)

Result	W–L	Date	Tournament	Tier	Surface	Partner	Opponents	Score
Win	1–0	Nov 2010	Phoenix Classic, United States	75,000	Hard	(Ukraine) Tetiana Luzhanska	(United States) Julia Boserup (United States) Sloane Stephens	7–5, 6–4
Win	2–0	April 2013	Charlottesville Open, United States	50,000	Clay	(United Kingdom) Nicola Slater	(United States) Nicole Gibbs (United States) Shelby Rogers	6–3, 7–6^{(7–4)}
Win	3–0	Sep 2013	Albuquerque Championships, United States	75,000	Hard	(Greece) Eleni Daniilidou	(United States) Melanie Oudin (United States) Taylor Townsend	6–4, 7–6^{(7–2)}
Win	4–0	Sep 2013	Las Vegas Open, United States	50,000	Hard	(Austria) Tamira Paszek	(United States) Denise Muresan (United States) Caitlin Whoriskey	6–4, 6–2
Win	5–0	Nov 2013	ITF New Braunfels, United States	50,000	Hard	(Georgia (country)) Anna Tatishvili	(United States) Asia Muhammad (United States) Taylor Townsend	3–6, 6–3, [13–11]
Win	6–0	Jun 2015	Eastbourne Trophy, United Kingdom	50,000	Grass	(United States) Shelby Rogers	(United Kingdom) Jocelyn Rae (United Kingdom) Anna Smith	7–5, 7–6^{(7–1)}

== Billie Jean King Cup ==
=== Finals: 2 (1 title, 1 runner-up) ===
Result	Date	Tournament	Surface	Partners	Opponents	Score
Loss	Nov 2010	Fed Cup, United States	Hard (i)	(United States) Bethanie Mattek-Sands (United States) Melanie Oudin (United States) Liezel Huber (United States) Christina McHale	(Italy) Francesca Schiavone (Italy) Flavia Pennetta (Italy) Roberta Vinci (Italy) Sara Errani	1–3
Win	Nov 2017	Fed Cup, Belarus	Hard (i)	(United States) Sloane Stephens (United States) Alison Riske (United States) Shelby Rogers (United States) Bethanie Mattek-Sands (United States) Lauren Davis	(Belarus) Aryna Sabalenka (Belarus) Aliaksandra Sasnovich	3–2

=== Participations ===
Current through the 2020 Fed Cup qualifying round

Legend WG F (Team won) WG F (Team lost) WG SF WG QF PO / WG2	Matches by surface Hard (7–2) Clay (6–3)	Matches by type Singles (8–4) Doubles (5–1)	Matches by location United States (7–2) Away (6–2)

==== Singles (8–4) ====
Edition	Round	Date	Location	Opponent nation	Surface	Opponent player	W/L	Score
2010	WG F	Nov 2010	San Diego, United States	Italy	Hard (i)	Francesca Schiavone	L	2–6, 4–6
2010	WG F	Nov 2010	San Diego, United States	Italy	Hard (i)	Flavia Pennetta	L	1–6, 2–6
2015	WG2	Feb 2015	Buenos Aires, Argentina	Argentina	Clay	Paula Ormaechea	L	4–6, 4–6
2016	PO	Apr 2016	Brisbane, Australia	Australia	Clay	Samantha Stosur	W	2–6, 7–5, 6–4
2017	WG QF	Feb 2017	Maui, United States	Germany	Hard	Julia Görges	W	6–3, 3–1 ret.
2017	WG QF	Feb 2017	Maui, United States	Germany	Hard	Andrea Petkovic	W	3–6, 6–4, 6–0
2017	WG SF	Apr 2017	Tampa, United States	Czech Republic	Clay	Markéta Vondroušová	W	6–1, 6–4
2017	WG SF	Apr 2017	Tampa, United States	Czech Republic	Clay	Kateřina Siniaková	W	6–4 6–0
2017	WG F	Nov 2017	Minsk, Belarus	Belarus	Hard (i)	Aliaksandra Sasnovich	W	6–4, 6–4
2017	WG F	Nov 2017	Minsk, Belarus	Belarus	Hard (i)	Aryna Sabalenka	W	7–6^{(7–5)}, 6–1
2018	WG QF	Feb 2018	Asheville, United States	Netherlands	Hard (i)	Richèl Hogenkamp	W	4–6, 7–6^{(8–6)}, 6–3
2018	WG SF	Apr 2018	Aix-en-Provence, France	France	Clay (i)	Kristina Mladenovic	L	6–1, 3–6, 2–6

==== Doubles (5–1) ====
Edition	Round	Date	Location	Opponent nation	Surface	Partner	Opponent players	W/L	Score
2015	WG2	Feb 2015	Buenos Aires, Argentina	Argentina	Clay	Taylor Townsend	Tatiana Búa; Nadia Podoroska	W	6–2, 6–3
2016	WG2	Feb 2016	Kailua Kona, United States	Poland	Hard	Bethanie Mattek-Sands	Klaudia Jans-Ignacik; Paula Kania	W	6–1, 7–5
2016	PO	Apr 2016	Brisbane, Australia	Australia	Clay	Bethanie Mattek-Sands	Daria Gavrilova; Arina Rodionova	W	6–1, 6–4
2017	WG SF	Apr 2017	Tampa, United States	Czech Republic	Clay	Bethanie Mattek-Sands	Kristýna Plíšková; Kateřina Siniaková	W	6–2, 6–3
2017	WG F	Nov 2017	Minsk, Belarus	Belarus	Hard (i)	Shelby Rogers	Aryna Sabalenka; Aliaksandra Sasnovich	W	6–3, 7–6^{(7–3)}
2018	WG SF	Apr 2018	Aix-en-Provence, France	France	Clay (i)	Bethanie Mattek-Sands	Kristina Mladenovic; Amandine Hesse	L	4–6, 6–3, [6–10]

== Hopman Cup ==
=== Finals: 1 runner-up ===
Result	Date	Tournament	Surface	Partners	Opponents	Score
Loss	Jan 2017	Hopman Cup, Australia	Hard	(United States) Jack Sock	(France) Kristina Mladenovic (France) Richard Gasquet	1–2

== Exhibition ==
Result	Date	Tournament	Surface	Partners	Opponents	Score
Win	Jan 2008	JB Group Classic, Hong Kong	Hard	(United States) Venus Williams (Argentina) Gisela Dulko	(Russia) Vera Zvonareva (Russia) Anna Chakvetadze (Russia) Alexandra Panova	3–1

== Record against other players ==
=== No. 1 wins ===
No.	Player	Event	Surface	Round	Score	Result
1.	(Germany) Angelique Kerber	2017 Australian Open, Australia	Hard	4R	6–2, 6–3	SF
2.	(Czech Republic) Karolína Plíšková	2017 US Open, United States	Hard	QF	7–6^{(7–4)}, 6–3	SF
3.	(Romania) Simona Halep	2018 Stuttgart Open, Germany	Clay (i)	QF	6–4, 6–1	F

=== Top 10 wins ===
Year	2010	...	2014	2015	2016	2017	2018	Total
Wins	1		2	1	4	5	3	16

#	Player	vsRank	Event	Surface	Round	Score	CVR
2010
1.	(Russia) Vera Zvonareva	9	Southern California Open, US	Hard	2R	2–6, 7–5, 6–4	205
2014
2.	(Serbia) Ana Ivanovic	10	Canadian Open	Hard	2R	6–7^{(7–9)}, 7–6^{(9–7)}, 6–4	51
3.	(Serbia) Jelena Janković	9	Canadian Open	Hard	3R	7–6^{(10–8)}, 2–6, 7–5	51
2015
4.	(Czech Republic) Lucie Šafářová	6	Wimbledon, UK	Grass	4R	7–6^{(7–1)}, 7–6^{(7–4)}	47
2016
5.	(Switzerland) Belinda Bencic	7	Qatar Open	Hard	2R	6–4, 6–2	43
6.	(Spain) Carla Suárez Navarro	6	Miami Open, United States	Hard	2R	6–4, 6–2	38
7.	(Poland) Agnieszka Radwańska	3	Birmingham Classic, UK	Grass	1R	7–5, 4–6, 6–3	32
8.	(Italy) Roberta Vinci	7	Wimbledon, UK	Grass	3R	6–3, 6–4	30
2017
9.	(Germany) Angelique Kerber	1	Australian Open	Hard	4R	6–2, 6–3	35
10.	(Spain) Garbiñe Muguruza	7	Australian Open	Hard	QF	6–4, 6–0	35
11.	(United Kingdom) Johanna Konta	7	Birmingham Classic, UK	Grass	2R	6–1, 6–3	30
12.	(Denmark) Caroline Wozniacki	6	Wimbledon, UK	Grass	4R	7–6^{(7–4)}, 6–4	25
13.	(Czech Republic) Karolína Plíšková	1	US Open, United States	Hard	QF	7–6^{(7–4)}, 6–3	22
2018
14.	(United States) Sloane Stephens	9	Stuttgart Open, Germany	Clay (i)	1R	6–1, 6–0	16
15.	(Romania) Simona Halep	1	Stuttgart Open, Germany	Clay (i)	QF	6–4, 6–1	16
16.	(France) Caroline Garcia	7	Stuttgart Open, Germany	Clay (i)	SF	6–4, 6–2	16
