= Alison Riske career statistics =

Performance data for the American tennis player

Career finals
Discipline	Type	Won	Lost	Total	WR
Singles	Grand Slam	–	–	–	–
Singles	Summer Olympics	–	–	–	–
Singles	WTA Finals	–	–	–	–
Singles	WTA 1000	0	1	1	0.00
Singles	WTA Tour	3	9	12	0.25
Singles	Total	3	10	13	0.23
Doubles	Grand Slam	–	–	–	–
Doubles	Summer Olympics	–	–	–	–
Doubles	WTA Finals	–	–	–	–
Doubles	WTA 1000	–	–	–	–
Doubles	WTA Tour	–	–	–	–
Doubles	Total	–	–	–	–
Total		3	10	13	0.23

This is a list of the main career statistics of professional American tennis player Alison Riske-Amritraj.

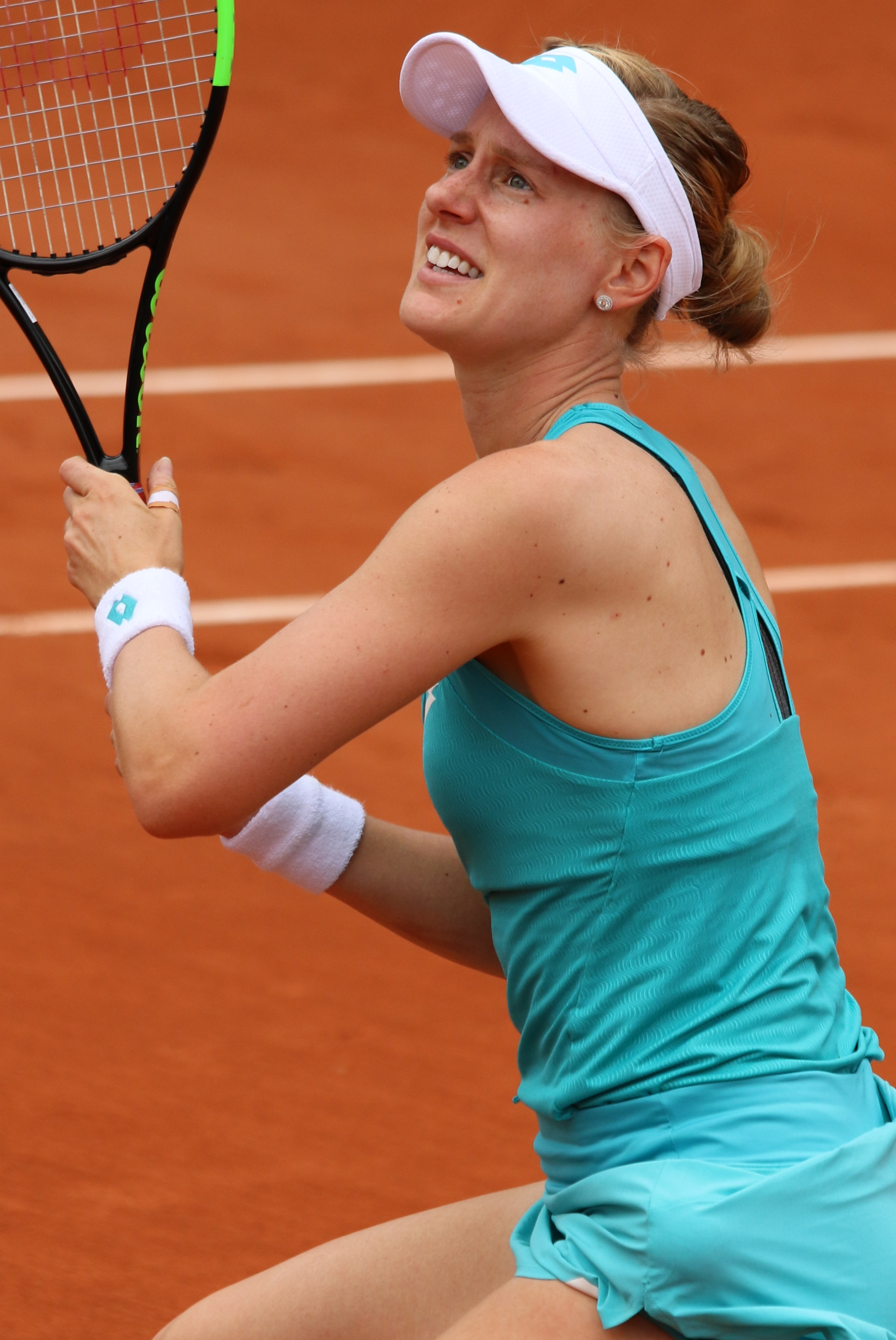
Riske at the 2019 French Open

== Performance timelines ==
Key
W	F	SF	QF	#R	RR	Q#	P#	DNQ	A	Z#	PO	G	S	B	NMS	NTI	P	NH

(W) winner; (F) finalist; (SF) semifinalist; (QF) quarterfinalist; (#R) rounds 4, 3, 2, 1; (RR) round-robin stage; (Q#) qualification round; (P#) preliminary round; (DNQ) did not qualify; (A) absent; (Z#) Davis/Fed Cup Zonal Group (with number indication) or (PO) play-off; (G) gold, (S) silver or (B) bronze Olympic/Paralympic medal; (NMS) not a Masters tournament; (NTI) not a Tier I tournament; (P) postponed; (NH) not held; (SR) strike rate (events won / competed); (W–L) win–loss record.
To avoid confusion and double counting, these charts are updated at the conclusion of a tournament or when the player's participation has ended.

Only main-draw results in WTA Tour, Grand Slam tournaments, Fed Cup/Billie Jean King Cup and Olympic Games are included in win–loss records.

=== Singles ===
Current through the 2023 Wimbledon.

Tournament	2007	2008	2009	2010	2011	2012	2013	2014	2015	2016	2017	2018	2019	2020	2021	2022	2023	SR	W–L	Win %
Grand Slam tournaments
Australian Open	A	A	A	A	1R	1R	Q3	3R	1R	1R	3R	1R	1R	4R	1R	2R	1R	0 / 12	8–12	40%
French Open	A	A	A	Q1	A	Q1	Q1	2R	1R	1R	1R	1R	1R	1R	A	2R	1R	0 / 9	2–9	18%
Wimbledon	A	A	A	1R	1R	Q2	3R	3R	1R	1R	3R	2R	QF	NH	1R	3R	1R	0 / 12	13–12	52%
US Open	Q2	A	Q1	Q1	1R	Q1	4R	1R	1R	1R	1R	1R	2R	2R	1R	4R	A	0 / 11	8–11	42%
Win–loss	0–0	0–0	0–0	0–1	0–3	0–1	5–2	5–4	0–4	0–4	4–4	1–4	5–4	4–3	0–3	7–4	0–3	0 / 44	31–44	41%
Year-end championships
WTA Elite Trophy (Note: WTA Tournament of Champions was held from 2009 to 2014, when WTA Elite Trophy replaced it.)	DNQ												RR	NH				0 / 1	0–2	0%
WTA 1000
Dubai / Qatar Open (Note: The first Premier 5 event of the year has switched back and forth between the Dubai Tennis Championships and the Qatar Open since 2009. Dubai was classified as a Premier 5 event from 2009 to 2011 before being succeeded by Doha for the 2012–2014 period. In 2015, Dubai regained its Premier 5 status while Doha was demoted to Premier status. The two tournaments have since alternated status every year.)	NMS	A	A	A	A	A	A	A	A	A	2R	A	3R	1R	A	1R	A	0 / 4	3–4	43%
Indian Wells Open	A	A	A	Q1	1R	A	A	1R	2R	1R	1R	Q1	1R	NH	2R	3R	1R	0 / 9	4–9	31%
Miami Open	A	A	A	A	Q1	Q1	A	2R	2R	Q1	1R	3R	2R	NH	A	4R	A	0 / 6	8–6	57%
Madrid Open	NH		A	A	A	A	A	2R	1R	1R	2R	Q1	1R	NH	1R	1R	A	0 / 7	2–7	22%
Italian Open	A	A	A	A	A	A	A	1R	2R	1R	1R	Q1	1R	1R	1R	A	A	0 / 7	1–7	13%
Canadian Open	A	A	A	Q2	Q1	A	1R	1R	2R	A	1R	Q2	2R	NH	1R	3R		0 / 7	4–7	36%
Cincinnati Open	NMS		A	Q1	A	A	Q2	Q1	1R	2R	1R	Q1	1R	1R	2R	3R		0 / 7	3–7	30%
Guadalajara Open	NH															A		0 / 0	0–0	–
Pan Pacific / Wuhan Open (Note: In 2014, the Pan Pacific Open was downgraded to a Premier event and replaced by the Wuhan Open.)	A	A	A	A	A	A	A	3R	1R	Q2	1R	A	F	NH				0 / 4	7–4	64%
China Open	NMS		A	A	A	A	A	1R	Q1	2R	1R	Q1	3R	NH				0 / 4	2–4	33%
Career statistics
Tournament	2007	2008	2009	2010	2011	2012	2013	2014	2015	2016	2017	2018	2019	2020	2021	2022	2023	SR	W–L	Win %
Tournaments	0	0	0	4	8	4	6	23	24	19	24	16	22	8	16	21	8	Career total: 203		
Titles	0	0	0	0	0	0	0	1	0	0	0	0	1	0	1	0	0	Career total: 3		
Finals	0	0	0	0	0	0	0	1	0	3	1	1	3	0	2	1	0	Career total: 12		
Hard win–loss	0–0	0–0	0–0	0–1	0–5	0–3	5–4	17–15	9–15	17–11	10–14	7–11	17–16	6–6	14–11	16–14	0–5	2 / 130	118–131	48%
Clay win–loss	0–0	0–0	0–0	0–1	0–1	0–0	0–0	3–5	2–5	2–6	5–6	4–3	0–4	0–2	0–2	2–3	0–1	0 / 39	18–39	32%
Grass win–loss	0–0	0–0	0–0	4–2	3–2	0–1	6–2	4–3	4–4	4–2	5–4	5–3	9–2	0–0	2–3	6–4	0–2	1 / 34	52–34	60%
Overall win–loss	0–0	0–0	0–0	4–4	3–8	0–4	11–6	24–23	15–24	23–19	20–24	16–17	26–22	6–8	16–16	24–21	0–8	3 / 203	188–204	48%
Win (%)	–	–	–	50%	27%	0%	65%	51%	38%	55%	45%	48%	54%	43%	50%	53%	0%	Career total: 48%		
Year-end ranking	627	895	222	118	135	179	57	45	97	41	70	63	18	26	51	41	652	$6,815,857		

=== Doubles ===
Current after the 2023 Australian Open.

Tournament	2011	2012	2013	2014	2015	2016	2017	2018	2019	2020	2021	2022	2023	SR	W–L	Win%
Grand Slam tournaments
Australian Open	A	A	A	3R	1R	A	1R	1R	SF	3R	1R	1R	2R	0 / 9	9–9	50%
French Open	A	A	A	3R	1R	A	2R	1R	1R	2R	A	A	A	0 / 6	4–6	40%
Wimbledon	A	A	A	2R	1R	1R	1R	1R	2R	NH	A	3R	1R	0 / 8	4–8	33%
US Open	1R	A	2R	2R	1R	2R	1R	1R	1R	QF	1R	A	A	0 / 10	6–10	38%
Win–loss	0–1	0–0	1–1	5–4	0–4	1–2	1–4	0–4	4–4	6–3	0–2	2–2	1–2	0 / 33	23–33	41%
National representation
Summer Olympics	NH	A	NH			A	NH				1R	NH		0 / 1	0–1	0%
WTA 1000
Dubai / Qatar Open	A	A	A	A	A	A	A	A	2R	A	A	A		0 / 1	1–1	50%
Indian Wells Open	A	A	A	1R	A	A	A	A	2R	NH	A	2R		0 / 3	2–3	40%
Miami Open	A	A	A	A	A	A	A	A	1R	NH	A	A		0 / 1	0–1	0%
Madrid Open	A	A	A	A	A	A	A	A	A	NH	A	A		0 / 0	0–0	–
Italian Open	A	A	A	A	A	A	A	A	A	A	A	A		0 / 0	0–0	–
Canadian Open	A	A	A	A	A	A	2R	A	A	NH	A	A		0 / 1	1–1	50%
Cincinnati Open	A	A	A	1R	A	A	1R	A	QF	1R	A	A		0 / 4	2–4	33%
Pan Pacific / Wuhan Open	A	A	A	1R	A	A	1R	A	1R	NH				0 / 3	0–3	0%
China Open	A	A	A	1R	A	A	1R	A	1R	NH				0 / 3	0–3	0%
Guadalajara Open	NH											A		0 / 0	0–0	–
Career statistics
Tournaments	3	1	2	11	8	6	13	5	14	6	5	3	2	Career total: 79		
Overall win–loss	1–3	2–1	1–2	8–11	2–9	4–6	6–13	2–5	11–13	7–6	0–5	3–3	1–2	0 / 79	48–79	38%
Year-end ranking	199	241	265	80	285	207	121	317	44	70	204	480	482			

== Significant finals ==
=== WTA 1000 finals ===
==== Singles: 1 (runner-up) ====
Result	Year	Tournament	Surface	Opponent	Score
Loss	2019	Wuhan Open	Hard	(Belarus) Aryna Sabalenka	3–6, 6–3, 1–6

== WTA Tour finals ==
=== Singles: 13 (3 titles, 10 runner-ups) ===
Legend WTA 1000 (0–1) WTA 500 WTA 250 (3–9)	Finals by surface Hard (2–7) Clay (0–1) Grass (1–2)

Result	W–L	Date	Tournament	Tier	Surface	Opponent	Score
Win	1–0	Oct 2014	Tianjin Open, China	International (Note: The WTA International tournaments were reclassified as WTA 250 tournaments in 2021.)	Hard	(Switzerland) Belinda Bencic	6–3, 6–4
Loss	1–1	Jan 2016	Shenzhen Open, China	International	Hard	(Poland) Agnieszka Radwańska	3–6, 2–6
Loss	1–2	Jun 2016	Nottingham Open, UK	International	Grass	(Czech Republic) Karolína Plíšková	6–7^{(8–10)}, 5–7
Loss	1–3	Oct 2016	Tianjin Open, China	International	Hard	(China) Peng Shuai	6–7^{(3–7)}, 2–6
Loss	1–4	Jan 2017	Shenzhen Open, China	International	Hard	(Czech Republic) Kateřina Siniaková	3–6, 4–6
Loss	1–5	May 2018	Nuremberg Cup, Germany	International	Clay	(Sweden) Johanna Larsson	6–7^{(4–7)}, 4–6
Loss	1–6	Jan 2019	Shenzhen Open, China	International	Hard	(Belarus) Aryna Sabalenka	6–4, 6–7^{(2–7)}, 3–6
Win	2–6	Jun 2019	Rosmalen Open, Netherlands	International	Grass	(Netherlands) Kiki Bertens	0–6, 7–6^{(7–3)}, 7–5
Loss	2–7	Sep 2019	Wuhan Open, China	Premier 5 (Note: The WTA Premier 5 & Mandatory tournaments were reclassified as WTA 1000 tournaments in 2021.)	Hard	(Belarus) Aryna Sabalenka	3–6, 6–3, 1–6
Loss	2–8	Sep 2021	Slovenia Open, Slovenia	WTA 250	Hard	(Italy) Jasmine Paolini	6–7^{(4–7)}, 2–6
Win	3–8	Nov 2021	Linz Open, Austria	WTA 250	Hard (i)	(Romania) Jaqueline Cristian	2–6, 6–2, 7–5
Loss	3–9	Jan 2022	Adelaide International, Australia	WTA 250	Hard	(United States) Madison Keys	1–6, 2–6
Loss	3–10	Jun 2022	Nottingham Open, UK	WTA 250	Grass	(Brazil) Beatriz Haddad Maia	4–6, 6–1, 3–6

== ITF Circuit finals ==
=== Singles: 13 (9 titles, 4 runner-ups) ===
Legend
$100,000 tournaments
$75,000 tournaments
$50,000 tournaments
$10,000 tournaments

Result	W–L	Date	Tournament	Tier	Surface	Opponent	Score
Loss	0–1	Jun 2009	ITF Hilton Head, US	10,000	Hard	(United States) Alexandra Mueller	1–6, 6–3, 3–6
Win	1–1	Oct 2009	Classic of Troy, US	50,000	Hard	(United States) Christina McHale	6–4, 2–6, 7–5
Loss	1–2	Sep 2010	Challenger de Saguenay, Canada	50,000	Hard (i)	(Canada) Rebecca Marino	4–6, 7–6^{(4)}, 6–7^{(5)}
Win	2–2	Oct 2010	GB Pro-Series Barnstaple, UK	75,000	Hard (i)	(Sweden) Johanna Larsson	6–2, 6–0
Win	3–2	Oct 2010	Open de Touraine, France	50,000	Hard (i)	(Russia) Vesna Manasieva	5–7, 6–4, 6–1
Win	4–2	Oct 2010	Open de Saint-Raphaël, France	50,000	Hard (i)	(Poland) Urszula Radwańska	6–4, 6–2
Loss	4–3	May 2011	ITF Indian Harbor Beach, US	50,000	Clay	(Hungary) Melinda Czink	6–4, 1–6, 4–6
Win	5–3	Oct 2011	Open de Touraine, France (2)	50,000	Hard (i)	(Uzbekistan) Akgul Amanmuradova	2–6, 6–2, 7–5
Win	6–3	Nov 2011	Open Nantes Atlantique, France	50,000	Hard (i)	(France) Iryna Brémond	6–1, 6–4
Loss	6–4	Jul 2013	Portland Challenger, US	50,000	Hard	(Japan) Kurumi Nara	3–6, 6–3, 3–6
Win	7–4	Jun 2016	Eastbourne Trophy, UK	50,000	Grass	(United Kingdom) Tara Moore	4–6, 7–6^{(7–5)}, 6–3
Win	8–4	Jun 2018	Surbiton Trophy, UK	100,000	Grass	(Switzerland) Conny Perrin	6–2, 6–4
Win	9–4	Jun 2019	Surbiton Trophy, UK (2)	100,000	Grass	(Slovakia) Magdaléna Rybáriková	6–7^{(5)}, 6–2, 6–2

=== Doubles: 4 (1 title, 3 runner-ups) ===
Legend
$100,000 tournaments
$50,000 tournaments
$10,000 tournaments

Result	W–L	Date	Tournament	Tier	Surface	Partner	Opponents	Score
Win	1–0	Jun 2009	ITF Hilton Head, United States	10,000	Hard	(United States) Jacqueline Cako	(United States) Natalie Pluskota (United States) Caitlin Whoriskey	6–3, 3–6, [10–6]
Loss	1–1	Jul 2009	Lexington Challenger, United States	50,000	Hard	(United States) Jacqueline Cako	(Taiwan) Chang Kai-chen (Ukraine) Tetiana Luzhanska	3–6, 2–6
Loss	1–2	Feb 2011	Midland Tennis Classic, United States	100,000	Hard (i)	(United States) Irina Falconi	(United States) Jamie Hampton (Georgia (country)) Anna Tatishvili	w/o
Loss	1–3	Apr 2011	Dothan Pro Classic, United States	50,000	Clay	(Canada) Heidi El Tabakh	(Russia) Valeria Solovieva (Slovakia) Lenka Wienerová	3–6, 4–6

== WTA Tour career earnings ==
Current after the 2022 French Open

Year	Grand Slam singles titles	WTA singles titles	Total singles titles	Earnings ($)	Money list rank
2013	0	0	0	345,032	73
2014	0	1	1	559,983	46
2015	0	0	0	357,918	87
2016	0	0	0	473,502	73
2017	0	0	0	613,511	53
2018	0	0	0	434,603	87
2019	0	1	1	1,461,212	27
2020	0	0	0	562,684	34
2021	0	1	1	401,177	105
2022	0	0	0	453,448	49
Career	0	3	3	5,969,870	105

== Career Grand Slam statistics ==
=== Grand Slam seedings ===
The tournaments won by Riske are in boldface, and advanced into finals by Riske are in italics.

Year	Australian Open	French Open	Wimbledon	US Open
2007	did not play	did not play	did not play	did not qualify
2008	did not play	did not play	did not play	did not play
2009	did not play	did not play	did not play	did not qualify
2010	did not play	did not qualify	wild card	did not qualify
2011	not seeded	did not play	not seeded	wild card
2012	qualifier	did not qualify	did not qualify	did not qualify
2013	did not qualify	did not qualify	wild card	wild card
2014	not seeded	not seeded	not seeded	not seeded
2015	not seeded	not seeded	not seeded	not seeded
2016	not seeded	not seeded	not seeded	not seeded
2017	not seeded	not seeded	not seeded	not seeded
2018	not seeded	not seeded	not seeded	not seeded
2019	not seeded	not seeded	not seeded	not seeded
2020	18th	19th	not held	13th
2021	24th	did not play	28th	not seeded
2022	not seeded	not seeded	28th	29th

== Record against other players ==
=== No. 1 wins ===
#	Player	Event	Surface	Rd	Score	Result
1.	(Australia) Ashleigh Barty	2019 Wimbledon	Grass	4R	3–6, 6–2, 6–3	QF

=== Record against top 10 players ===
Result	Player	Rank	Event	Surface	Rd	Score	
2013
Win		(Czech Republic) Petra Kvitová	No. 10	US Open, United States	Hard	3R	6–3, 6–0
2015
Win		(Spain) Carla Suárez Navarro	No. 10	Silicon Valley Classic, US	Hard	2R	6–4, 6–4
2016
Win		(Russia) Svetlana Kuznetsova	No. 8	Tianjin Open, China	Hard	SF	6–4, 5–7, 6–4
2017
Win		(Poland) Agnieszka Radwańska	No. 3	Shenzhen Open, China	Hard	QF	6–2, 3–6, 6–0
2018
Win		(France) Caroline Garcia	No. 7	Miami Open, US	Hard	2R	6–3, 6–1
2019
Win		(Netherlands) Kiki Bertens	No. 4	Rosmalen Open, Netherlands	Grass	F	0–6, 7–6^{(7–3)}, 7–5
Win		(Australia) Ashleigh Barty	No. 1	Wimbledon, UK	Grass	4R	3–6, 6–2, 6–3
Win		(Ukraine) Elina Svitolina	No. 3	Wuhan Open, China	Hard	QF	6–1, 6–3
Win		(Czech Republic) Petra Kvitová	No. 7	Wuhan Open, China	Hard	SF	7–5, 7–5
2022
Win		(Spain) Garbiñe Muguruza	No. 9	Indian Wells Open, US	Hard	2R	0–6, 6–3, 6–1
