= 2015 Aegon Eastbourne Trophy =

- Date: 1–7 June
- Edition: 1st
- Category: ITF Women's Circuit
- Prize money: $50,000
- Surface: Grass
- Location: Eastbourne, United Kingdom

Champions

Singles
- (Estonia) Anett Kontaveit

Doubles
- (United States) Shelby Rogers / (United States) Coco Vandeweghe
Aegon Eastbourne Trophy	· 2016 →

The 2015 Aegon Eastbourne Trophy was a professional tennis tournament played on outdoor grass courts. It was the first edition of the tournament and part of the 2015 ITF Women's Circuit, offering a total of $50,000 in prize money. It took place in Eastbourne, United Kingdom, on 1–7 June 2015.

== Singles main draw entrants ==
=== Seeds ===
Country	Player	Rank^{1}	Seed
CHN	Wang Qiang	107	1
CHN	Zhu Lin	108	2
BEL	An-Sophie Mestach	111	3
CZE	Kristýna Plíšková	113	4
POR	Michelle Larcher de Brito	126	5
RUS	Alla Kudryavtseva	128	6
TUR	Çağla Büyükakçay	139	7
FRA	Océane Dodin	142	8

- ^{1} Rankings as of 25 May 2015

=== Other entrants ===
The following players received wildcards into the singles main draw:

- (United Kingdom) Naomi Cavaday
- (United Kingdom) Harriet Dart
- (United Kingdom) Francesca Stephenson
- (United Kingdom) Emily Webley-Smith

The following players received entry from the qualifying draw:

- (Australia) Alison Bai
- (Greece) Eleni Daniilidou
- (Spain) Georgina García Pérez
- (United Kingdom) Tara Moore

== Champions ==
=== Singles ===
- (Estonia) Anett Kontaveit def. (Russia) Alla Kudryavtseva, 7–6^{(7–4)}, 7–6^{(7–2)}

=== Doubles ===
- (United States) Shelby Rogers / (United States) Coco Vandeweghe def. (United Kingdom) Jocelyn Rae / (United Kingdom) Anna Smith, 7–5, 7–6^{(7–1)}
