= 2016 Aegon Eastbourne Trophy =

- Date: 30 May–5 June
- Edition: 2nd
- Category: ITF Women's Circuit
- Prize money: $50,000
- Surface: Grass
- Location: Eastbourne, United Kingdom

Champions

Singles
- (United States) Alison Riske

Doubles
- (China) Yang Zhaoxuan / (China) Zhang Kailin
← 2015 ·	Aegon Eastbourne Trophy

The 2016 Aegon Eastbourne Trophy was a professional tennis tournament played on outdoor grass courts. It was the second edition of the tournament and part of the 2016 ITF Women's Circuit, offering a total of $50,000 in prize money. It took place in Eastbourne, United Kingdom, on 30 May–5 June 2016.

== Singles main draw entrants ==
=== Seeds ===
Country	Player	Rank^{1}	Seed
USA	Alison Riske	93	1
CRO	Donna Vekić	96	2
CHN	Zhang Kailin	117	3
AUT	Tamira Paszek	123	4
CHN	Duan Yingying	133	5
POL	Urszula Radwańska	140	6
CHN	Wang Yafan	143	7
FRA	Océane Dodin	148	8

- ^{1} Rankings as of 23 May 2016.

=== Other entrants ===
The following player received a wildcard into the singles main draw:

- (United Kingdom) Katy Dunne
- (United Kingdom) Tara Moore
- (United Kingdom) Laura Robson
- (United Kingdom) Lisa Whybourn

The following players received entry from the qualifying draw:

- (Australia) Naiktha Bains
- (Australia) Ashleigh Barty
- (United States) Sanaz Marand
- (Australia) Storm Sanders

The following player received entry by a lucky loser spot:

- (Australia) Alison Bai

The following players received entry by protected rankings:

- (Portugal) Michelle Larcher de Brito
- (United States) Melanie Oudin

== Champions ==
=== Singles ===
- (United States) Alison Riske def. (United Kingdom) Tara Moore, 4–6, 7–6^{(7–5)}, 6–3

=== Doubles ===
- (China) Yang Zhaoxuan / (China) Zhang Kailin def. (United States) Asia Muhammad / (United States) Maria Sanchez, 7–6^{(7–1)}, 6–1
