= 2015 Aegon Eastbourne Trophy – Singles =

Singles
- 2015 Aegon Eastbourne Trophy

Final
- Champion: (Estonia) Anett Kontaveit
- Runner-up: (Russia) Alla Kudryavtseva
- Score: 7–6^{(7–4)}, 7–6^{(7–2)}

Events
Singles	Doubles
Aegon Eastbourne Trophy	· 2016 →

This was a new event in the ITF Women's Circuit.

Anett Kontaveit won the inaugural event, defeating Alla Kudryavtseva in the final, 7–6^{(7–4)}, 7–6^{(7–2)}.

== Seeds ==
1. (China) Wang Qiang (quarterfinals)
2. (China) Zhu Lin (first round)
3. (Belgium) An-Sophie Mestach (first round)
4. (Czech Republic) Kristýna Plíšková (second round)
5. (Portugal) Michelle Larcher de Brito (semifinals)
6. (Russia) Alla Kudryavtseva (final)
7. (Turkey) Çağla Büyükakçay (first round)
8. (France) Océane Dodin (quarterfinals)

== Main draw ==
=== Key ===
- Q = Qualifier
- WC = Wild card
- LL = Lucky loser
- Alt = Alternate
- SE = Special exempt
- PR = Protected ranking
- ITF = ITF entry
- JE = Junior exempt
- w/o = Walkover
- r = Retired
- d = Defaulted
- SR = Special ranking

=== Finals ===
Semifinals
5	(Portugal) Michelle Larcher de Brito	5	6^{2}
6	(Russia) Alla Kudryavtseva	7	7^{7}
(Estonia) Anett Kontaveit	7^{7}	6
(United States) Julia Boserup	6^{2}	1

Final
6	(Russia) Alla Kudryavtseva	6^{4}	6^{2}
(Estonia) Anett Kontaveit	7^{7}	7^{7}

=== Top half ===
First round
1	(China) Q Wang	6	6
WC	(United Kingdom) H Dart	1	1
(Germany) N Zander	7^{9}	6
(France) S Foretz	6^{7}	3
Q	(Australia) A Bai	6	6
WC	(United Kingdom) F Stephenson	2	2
(Brazil) B Haddad Maia	1	2
5	(Portugal) M Larcher de Brito	6	6
4	(Czech Republic) Kr Plíšková	7^{9}	6
(United Kingdom) K Dunne	6^{7}	4
(United States) M Sanchez	6	6^{7}	0
Q	(United Kingdom) T Moore	3	7^{9}	6
(Brazil) PC Gonçalves	4	3
(Austria) T Paszek	6	6
WC	(United Kingdom) N Cavaday	1	5
6	(Russia) A Kudryavtseva	6	7

Second round
1	(China) Q Wang	7^{7}	6
(Germany) N Zander	6^{5}	1
Q	(Australia) A Bai	2	3
5	(Portugal) M Larcher de Brito	6	6
4	(Czech Republic) Kr Plíšková	1	2
Q	(United Kingdom) T Moore	6	6
(Austria) T Paszek	4	3
6	(Russia) A Kudryavtseva	6	6

Quarterfinals
1	(China) Q Wang	1	3
5	(Portugal) M Larcher de Brito	6	6
Q	(United Kingdom) T Moore	2	6	4
6	(Russia) A Kudryavtseva	6	2	6

Semifinals
5	(Portugal) M Larcher de Brito	5	6^{2}
6	(Russia) A Kudryavtseva	7	7^{7}

=== Bottom half ===
First round
8	(France) O Dodin	6	4	6
WC	(United Kingdom) E Webley-Smith	3	6	2
(China) K Zhang	6	2	4
(United Kingdom) N Broady	1	6	6
Q	(Spain) G García Pérez	7^{7}	2	7^{10}
(Slovakia) R Šramková	6^{4}	6	6^{8}
(Estonia) A Kontaveit	6	7
3	(Belgium) A-S Mestach	4	5
7	(Turkey) Ç Büyükakçay	4	4
(United States) J Boserup	6	6
(Japan) S Aoyama	2	6	6
(China) Z Yang	6	2	3
(Bulgaria) E Kostova	6	1	6^{7}
(Croatia) P Martić	1	6	7^{9}
Q	(Greece) E Daniilidou	6	6
2	(China) L Zhu	4	2

Second round
8	(France) O Dodin	2	6	7^{7}
(United Kingdom) N Broady	6	2	6^{4}
Q	(Spain) G García Pérez	3	2
(Estonia) A Kontaveit	6	6
(United States) J Boserup	6	6
(Japan) S Aoyama	2	4
(Croatia) P Martić	6	6
Q	(Greece) E Daniilidou	2	1

Quarterfinals
8	(France) O Dodin	3	2
(Estonia) A Kontaveit	6	6
(United States) J Boserup	6	6
(Croatia) P Martić	1	3

Semifinals
(Estonia) A Kontaveit	7^{7}	6
(United States) J Boserup	6^{2}	1
