= 2013 Oregon Challenger =

- Date: July 15–21
- Edition: 1st
- Draw: 32S / 16D
- Prize money: $50,000
- Surface: Hard
- Location: Portland, United States

Champions

Singles
- (Japan) Kurumi Nara

Doubles
- (United States) Irina Falconi / (United States) Nicole Melichar
- Oregon Challenger

The 2013 Oregon Challenger was a professional tennis tournament played on outdoor hard courts. It was the first edition of the tournament which was part of the 2013 ITF Women's Circuit, offering a total of $50,000 in prize money. It took place in Portland, Oregon, United States, on July 15–21, 2013.

== WTA entrants ==
=== Seeds ===
Country	Player	Rank^{1}	Seed
USA	Lauren Davis	86	1
JPN	Misaki Doi	97	2
USA	Alison Riske	102	3
JPN	Kurumi Nara	126	4
USA	Shelby Rogers	140	5
CAN	Stéphanie Dubois	157	6
USA	Grace Min	158	7
USA	Irina Falconi	163	8

- ^{1} Rankings as of July 8, 2013

=== Other entrants ===
The following players received wildcards into the singles main draw:

- (United States) Krista Hardebeck
- (United States) Jamie Loeb

The following players received entry from the qualifying draw:

- (United States) Elizabeth Lumpkin
- (United States) Brianna Morgan
- (Australia) Sally Peers
- (United States) Natalie Pluskota

The following player received entry into the singles main draw as a lucky loser:

- (United States) Nicole Melichar

== Champions ==
=== Women's singles ===
- (Japan) Kurumi Nara def. (United States) Alison Riske 3–6, 6–3, 6–3

=== Women's doubles ===
- (United States) Irina Falconi / (United States) Nicole Melichar def. (United States) Sanaz Marand / (United States) Ashley Weinhold 4–6, 6–3, [10–8]
