= 2013 Oregon Challenger – Doubles =

Doubles
- 2013 Oregon Challenger

Final
- Champions: (United States) Irina Falconi (United States) Nicole Melichar
- Runners-up: (United States) Sanaz Marand (United States) Ashley Weinhold
- Score: 4–6, 6–3, [10–8]

Events
Singles	Doubles
← 2012 ·	Oregon Challenger	· 2014 →

This was a new event on the ITF Women's Circuit. Irina Falconi and Nicole Melichar won the tournament, defeating Sanaz Marand and Ashley Weinhold in the all-American final, 4–6, 6–3, [10–8].

== Seeds ==
1. (United States) Irina Falconi / (United States) Nicole Melichar (champions)
2. (United States) Jacqueline Cako / (United States) Natalie Pluskota (semifinals)
3. (Thailand) Nicha Lertpitaksinchai / (Thailand) Peangtarn Plipuech (semifinals)
4. (Russia) Angelina Gabueva / (South Africa) Chanel Simmonds (first round)

== Draw ==
=== Key ===
- Q = Qualifier
- WC = Wild card
- LL = Lucky loser
- Alt = Alternate
- SE = Special exempt
- PR = Protected ranking
- ITF = ITF entry
- JE = Junior exempt
- w/o = Walkover
- r = Retired
- d = Defaulted
- SR = Special ranking

First round
1	(United States) I Falconi (United States) N Melichar	6	6
(United States) MR Lane (United States) C Whoriskey	1	1
(United States) J Abaza (Canada) S Dubois	6	4	[8]
(United States) L Davis (United States) G Min	2	6	[10]
3	(Thailand) N Lertpitaksinchai (Thailand) Pe Plipuech	6	6
(United States) E Harman (United States) E Lumpkin	4	2
(United States) J Loeb (United States) S Vickery	4	0
(United States) M Harkins (Australia) S Jones	6	6
(United States) M Brengle (Australia) S Peers	5	6	[6]
(United States) S Marand (United States) A Weinhold	7	2	[10]
(Japan) M Hibi (South Korea) S-r Lee	6	6
4	(Russia) A Gabueva (South Africa) C Simmonds	3	3
(United States) M Lewis (United States) E Profit	0	0
(Japan) K Nara (Japan) E Sema	6	6
(United States) D Ivanova (United States) S Schenck	2	0
2	(United States) J Cako (United States) N Pluskota	6	6

Quarterfinals
1	(United States) I Falconi (United States) N Melichar	w/o
(United States) L Davis (United States) G Min
3	(Thailand) N Lertpitaksinchai (Thailand) Pe Plipuech	6	4	[10]
(United States) M Harkins (Australia) S Jones	3	6	[7]
(United States) S Marand (United States) A Weinhold	6	6
(Japan) M Hibi (South Korea) S-r Lee	4	4
(Japan) K Nara (Japan) E Sema	4	5
2	(United States) J Cako (United States) N Pluskota	6	7

Semifinals
1	(United States) I Falconi (United States) N Melichar	6	6
3	(Thailand) N Lertpitaksinchai (Thailand) Pe Plipuech	3	4
(United States) S Marand (United States) A Weinhold	6	3	[10]
2	(United States) J Cako (United States) N Pluskota	4	6	[5]

Final
1	(United States) I Falconi (United States) N Melichar	4	6	[10]
(United States) S Marand (United States) A Weinhold	6	3	[8]
