= 2015 Aegon Eastbourne Trophy – Doubles =

Doubles
- 2015 Aegon Eastbourne Trophy

Final
- Champions: (United States) Shelby Rogers (United States) Coco Vandeweghe
- Runners-up: (United Kingdom) Jocelyn Rae (United Kingdom) Anna Smith
- Score: 7–5, 7–6^{(7–1)}

Events
Singles	Doubles
Aegon Eastbourne Trophy	· 2016 →

This was a new event in the ITF Women's Circuit.

American-duo Shelby Rogers and Coco Vandeweghe won the title, defeating the top seeds Jocelyn Rae and Anna Smith in the final, 7–5, 7–6^{(7–1)}.

== Seeds ==
1. (United Kingdom) Jocelyn Rae / (United Kingdom) Anna Smith (final)
2. (Japan) Shuko Aoyama / (Belgium) An-Sophie Mestach (quarterfinals)
3. (Romania) Elena Bogdan / (Czech Republic) Eva Hrdinová (semifinals)
4. (Turkey) Çağla Büyükakçay / (Russia) Alla Kudryavtseva (semifinals)

== Draw ==
=== Key ===
- Q = Qualifier
- WC = Wild card
- LL = Lucky loser
- Alt = Alternate
- SE = Special exempt
- PR = Protected ranking
- ITF = ITF entry
- JE = Junior exempt
- w/o = Walkover
- r = Retired
- d = Defaulted
- SR = Special ranking

First round
1	(United Kingdom) J Rae (United Kingdom) A Smith	7	6
WC	(United Kingdom) H Dart (United Kingdom) K Dunne	5	4
WC	(United Kingdom) N Cavaday (United Kingdom) F Stephenson	6^{3}	5
(Austria) T Paszek (United Kingdom) E Webley-Smith	7^{7}	7
4	(Turkey) Ç Büyükakçay (Russia) A Kudryavtseva	6	6
(Australia) A Bai (Bulgaria) E Kostova	2	2
(Czech Republic) L Kunčíková (Czech Republic) K Stuchlá	6^{2}	1
(United Kingdom) T Moore (United Kingdom) N Slater	7^{7}	6
(United Kingdom) N Broady (Czech Republic) Kr Plíšková	6	3	[9]
(United Kingdom) J Konta (United States) M Sanchez	3	6	[11]
(Brazil) PC Gonçalves (Brazil) B Haddad Maia	1	6	[4]
3	(Romania) E Bogdan (Czech Republic) E Hrdinová	6	3	[10]
(United States) S Rogers (United States) C Vandeweghe	6	6
WC	(Poland) A Barańska (United Kingdom) L Deigman	0	3
(China) Z Yang (China) L Zhu	4	3
2	(Japan) S Aoyama (Belgium) A-S Mestach	6	6

Quarterfinals
1	(United Kingdom) J Rae (United Kingdom) A Smith	6	6
(Austria) T Paszek (United Kingdom) E Webley-Smith	2	3
4	(Turkey) Ç Büyükakçay (Russia) A Kudryavtseva	6	6
(United Kingdom) T Moore (United Kingdom) N Slater	2	4
(United Kingdom) J Konta (United States) M Sanchez	5	7^{7}	[10]
3	(Romania) E Bogdan (Czech Republic) E Hrdinová	7	6^{5}	[12]
(United States) S Rogers (United States) C Vandeweghe	6	6
2	(Japan) S Aoyama (Belgium) A-S Mestach	2	2

Semifinals
1	(United Kingdom) J Rae (United Kingdom) A Smith	6	7^{7}
4	(Turkey) Ç Büyükakçay (Russia) A Kudryavtseva	2	6^{2}
3	(Romania) E Bogdan (Czech Republic) E Hrdinová	5	3
(United States) S Rogers (United States) C Vandeweghe	7	6

Final
1	(United Kingdom) J Rae (United Kingdom) A Smith	5	6^{1}
(United States) S Rogers (United States) C Vandeweghe	7	7^{7}
