= 2016 Aegon Eastbourne Trophy – Doubles =

Doubles
- 2016 Aegon Eastbourne Trophy

Final
- Champions: (China) Yang Zhaoxuan (China) Zhang Kailin
- Runners-up: (United States) Asia Muhammad (United States) Maria Sanchez
- Score: 7–6^{(7–1)}, 6–1

Events
Singles	Doubles
← 2015 ·	Aegon Eastbourne Trophy

Shelby Rogers and Coco Vandeweghe were the defending champions, but chose not to participate.

Yang Zhaoxuan and Zhang Kailin won the title, defeating Asia Muhammad and Maria Sanchez in the final, 7–6^{(7–1)}, 6–1.

== Seeds ==
1. (United States) Asia Muhammad / (United States) Maria Sanchez (final)
2. (China) Yang Zhaoxuan / (China) Zhang Kailin (champions)
3. (United Kingdom) Tara Moore / (Switzerland) Conny Perrin (semifinals)
4. (Australia) Ashleigh Barty / (Australia) Storm Sanders (semifinals)

== Draw ==
=== Key ===
- Q = Qualifier
- WC = Wild card
- LL = Lucky loser
- Alt = Alternate
- SE = Special exempt
- PR = Protected ranking
- ITF = ITF entry
- JE = Junior exempt
- w/o = Walkover
- r = Retired
- d = Defaulted
- SR = Special ranking

First round
1	(United States) A Muhammad (United States) M Sanchez	6	3	[10]
(Brazil) PC Gonçalves (Austria) T Paszek	3	6	[7]
(United Kingdom) S Murray (United Kingdom) E Webley-Smith	3	7^{7}	[10]
(Italy) M Caregaro (Finland) M Eklund	6	6^{5}	[7]
4	(Australia) A Barty (Australia) S Sanders	7^{7}	6
(China) Y Zhang (China) L Zhu	6^{4}	4
(United States) J Boserup (United States) A Riske	4	6^{4}
(United States) S Marand (United States) M Oudin	6	7^{7}
WC	(United Kingdom) A Pitak (United Kingdom) K Pitak	3	6^{1}
(Spain) G García Pérez (Bulgaria) J Terziyska	6	7^{7}
WC	(United Kingdom) L Robson (Croatia) D Vekić	4	2
3	(United Kingdom) T Moore (Switzerland) C Perrin	6	6
(United Kingdom) E Arbuthnott (United Kingdom) SB Grey	6	6
(Australia) A Bai (Australia) N Bains	3	4
WC	(United Kingdom) L Phillips (United Kingdom) T Tuen-Matthews	0	0
2	(China) Z Yang (China) K Zhang	6	6

Quarterfinals
1	(United States) A Muhammad (United States) M Sanchez	6	6
(United Kingdom) S Murray (United Kingdom) E Webley-Smith	1	0
4	(Australia) A Barty (Australia) S Sanders	6	6
(United States) S Marand (United States) M Oudin	3	0
(Spain) G García Pérez (Bulgaria) J Terziyska
3	(United Kingdom) T Moore (Switzerland) C Perrin	w/o
(United Kingdom) E Arbuthnott (United Kingdom) SB Grey	0	6^{5}
2	(China) Z Yang (China) K Zhang	6	7^{7}

Semifinals
1	(United States) A Muhammad (United States) M Sanchez	6	6
4	(Australia) A Barty (Australia) S Sanders	1	4
3	(United Kingdom) T Moore (Switzerland) C Perrin	2	1
2	(China) Z Yang (China) K Zhang	6	6

Final
1	(United States) A Muhammad (United States) M Sanchez	6^{5}	1
2	(China) Z Yang (China) K Zhang	7^{7}	6
