= 2017 Fed Cup World Group =

Part of tennis tournament

- Date: 11 February – 12 November
- Edition: 27th

Champions
- United States
- Fed Cup

The World Group was the highest level of Fed Cup competition in 2017.

Participating teams
Belarus	Czech Republic	France	Germany
Netherlands	Spain	Switzerland	United States

== Draw ==
Quarterfinals; 11–12 February
Ostrava, Czech Republic (hard, indoor)
1	Czech Republic	3
Spain	2
Maui, Hawaii, United States (hard, outdoor)
3	Germany	0
United States	4
Minsk, Belarus (hard, indoor)
Belarus	4
4	Netherlands	1
Geneva, Switzerland (hard, indoor)
Switzerland	4
2	France	1

Semifinals; 22–23 April
Tampa, United States (clay, outdoor)
1	Czech Republic	2
United States	3
Minsk, Belarus (hard, indoor)
Belarus	3
Switzerland	2

Final; 11–12 November
Minsk, Belarus (hard, indoor)
United States	3
Belarus	2

== Quarterfinals ==
=== Czech Republic vs. Spain ===
Czech Republic
3
Ostravar Aréna, Ostrava, Czech Republic
11–12 February 2017
Hard (indoors)

Spain
2

			1	2	3
1	(Czech Republic) (Spain)	Barbora Strýcová; Garbiñe Muguruza	0; 6	6; 3	1; 6
2	(Czech Republic) (Spain)	Karolína Plíšková; Lara Arruabarrena	6; 4	7; 5
3	(Czech Republic) (Spain)	Karolína Plíšková; Garbiñe Muguruza	6; 2	6; 2
4	(Czech Republic) (Spain)	Barbora Strýcová; Lara Arruabarrena	6; 4	6; 4
5	(Czech Republic) (Spain)	Lucie Šafářová / Kateřina Siniaková; María José Martínez Sánchez / Sara Sorribes Tormo	3; 6	6; 4	7; 10

=== United States vs. Germany ===
United States
4
Royal Lahaina Resort, Maui, United States
11–12 February 2017
Hard

Germany
0

			1	2	3
1	(United States) (Germany)	Alison Riske; Andrea Petkovic	7^{12} 6^{10}	6; 2
2	(United States) (Germany)	Coco Vandeweghe; Julia Görges	6; 3	3; 1		retired
3	(United States) (Germany)	Coco Vandeweghe; Andrea Petkovic	3; 6	6; 4	6; 0
4	(United States) (Germany)	Alison Riske; Julia Görges				not played
5	(United States) (Germany)	Bethanie Mattek-Sands / Shelby Rogers; Laura Siegemund / Carina Witthöft	4; 1			retired

=== Belarus vs. Netherlands ===
Belarus
4
Chizhovka-Arena, Minsk, Belarus
11–12 February 2017
Hard (indoors)

Netherlands
1

			1	2	3
1	(Belarus) (Netherlands)	Aliaksandra Sasnovich; Michaëlla Krajicek	4; 6	6; 3	6; 2
2	(Belarus) (Netherlands)	Aryna Sabalenka; Kiki Bertens	6; 3	6^{6} 7^{8}	4; 6
3	(Belarus) (Netherlands)	Aliaksandra Sasnovich; Kiki Bertens	6; 3	6; 4
4	(Belarus) (Netherlands)	Aryna Sabalenka; Michaëlla Krajicek	7^{7} 6^{5}	6; 4
5	(Belarus) (Netherlands)	Olga Govortsova / Vera Lapko; Cindy Burger / Arantxa Rus	6; 4	6; 2

=== Switzerland vs. France ===
Switzerland
4
Palexpo, Geneva, Switzerland
11–12 February 2017
Hard (indoors)

France
1

			1	2	3
1	(Switzerland) (France)	Timea Bacsinszky; Alizé Cornet	7; 5	6; 4
2	(Switzerland) (France)	Belinda Bencic; Kristina Mladenovic	3; 6	4; 6
3	(Switzerland) (France)	Timea Bacsinszky; Kristina Mladenovic	7^{7} 6^{4}	4; 6	7; 5
4	(Switzerland) (France)	Belinda Bencic; Pauline Parmentier	6; 3	6; 4
5	(Switzerland) (France)	Martina Hingis / Timea Bacsinszky; Amandine Hesse / Kristina Mladenovic	6; 4	6; 4

== Semifinals ==
=== United States vs. Czech Republic ===
United States
3
Saddlebrook Resort, Tampa, United States
22–23 April 2017
Clay

Czech Republic
2

			1	2	3
1	(United States) (Czech Republic)	Coco Vandeweghe; Markéta Vondroušová	6; 4	6; 1
2	(United States) (Czech Republic)	Shelby Rogers; Kateřina Siniaková	3; 6	3; 6
3	(United States) (Czech Republic)	Coco Vandeweghe; Kateřina Siniaková	6; 4	6; 0
4	(United States) (Czech Republic)	Lauren Davis; Markéta Vondroušová	2; 6	5; 7
5	(United States) (Czech Republic)	Bethanie Mattek-Sands / Coco Vandeweghe; Kristýna Plíšková / Kateřina Siniaková	6; 2	6; 3

=== Belarus vs. Switzerland ===
Belarus
3
Chizhovka-Arena, Minsk, Belarus
22–23 April 2017
Hard (indoors)

Switzerland
2

			1	2	3
1	(Belarus) (Switzerland)	Aliaksandra Sasnovich; Viktorija Golubic	6; 3	5; 7	7; 5
2	(Belarus) (Switzerland)	Aryna Sabalenka; Timea Bacsinszky	4; 6	5; 7
3	(Belarus) (Switzerland)	Aliaksandra Sasnovich; Timea Bacsinszky	6; 2	7^{7} 6^{2}
4	(Belarus) (Switzerland)	Aryna Sabalenka; Viktorija Golubic	6; 3	2; 6	6; 4
5	(Belarus) (Switzerland)	Olga Govortsova / Vera Lapko; Belinda Bencic / Martina Hingis	0; 6	1; 6

== Final ==
=== Belarus vs. United States ===
Belarus
2
Chizhovka-Arena, Minsk, Belarus
11–12 November 2017
Hard (indoors)

United States
3

			1	2	3
1	(Belarus) (United States)	Aliaksandra Sasnovich; CoCo Vandeweghe	4; 6	4; 6
2	(Belarus) (United States)	Aryna Sabalenka; Sloane Stephens	6; 3	3; 6	6; 4
3	(Belarus) (United States)	Aryna Sabalenka; CoCo Vandeweghe	6^{5} 7^{7}	1; 6
4	(Belarus) (United States)	Aliaksandra Sasnovich; Sloane Stephens	4; 6	6; 1	8; 6
5	(Belarus) (United States)	Aryna Sabalenka / Aliaksandra Sasnovich; Shelby Rogers / CoCo Vandeweghe	3; 6	6^{3} 7^{7}
