= 2013 Oregon Challenger – Singles =

Singles
- 2013 Oregon Challenger

Final
- Champion: (Japan) Kurumi Nara
- Runner-up: (United States) Alison Riske
- Score: 3–6, 6–3, 6–3

Events
Singles	Doubles
← 2012 ·	Oregon Challenger	· 2014 →

This was a new event on the ITF Women's Circuit. Kurumi Nara won the tournament, defeating Alison Riske in the final, 3–6, 6–3, 6–3.

== Seeds ==
1. (United States) Lauren Davis (first round)
2. (Japan) Misaki Doi (second round)
3. (United States) Alison Riske (final)
4. (Japan) Kurumi Nara (champion)
5. (United States) Shelby Rogers (semifinals)
6. (Canada) Stéphanie Dubois (second round)
7. (United States) Grace Min (semifinals)
8. (United States) Irina Falconi (first round)

== Main draw ==
=== Key ===
- Q = Qualifier
- WC = Wild card
- LL = Lucky loser
- Alt = Alternate
- SE = Special exempt
- PR = Protected ranking
- ITF = ITF entry
- JE = Junior exempt
- w/o = Walkover
- r = Retired
- d = Defaulted
- SR = Special ranking

=== Finals ===
Semifinals
7	(United States) Grace Min	6^{6}	0
4	(Japan) Kurumi Nara	7^{8}	6
3	(United States) Alison Riske	4	6	6
5	(United States) Shelby Rogers	6	3	3

Final
4	(Japan) Kurumi Nara	3	6	6
3	(United States) Alison Riske	6	3	3

=== Top half ===
First round
1	(United States) L Davis	1	6	4
(Japan) M Hibi	6	4	6
WC	(United States) K Hardebeck	6	6^{5}	4
(Slovenia) P Rampre	4	7^{7}	6
(United States) J Abaza	6	6
Q	(Australia) S Peers	1	3
Q	(United States) N Pluskota	3	1
7	(United States) G Min	6	6
4	(Japan) K Nara	6	6
(Thailand) P Plipuech	3	3
(United States) A Weinhold	4	0
(South Africa) C Simmonds	6	6
(United States) S Marand	5	7^{7}	0
(Japan) E Sema	7	6^{5}	6
(Canada) H El Tabakh	5	6^{2}
6	(Canada) S Dubois	7	7^{7}

Second round
(Japan) M Hibi	6^{5}	6	6
(Slovenia) P Rampre	7^{7}	3	1
(United States) J Abaza	4	3
7	(United States) G Min	6	6
4	(Japan) K Nara	6	6
(South Africa) C Simmonds	1	2
(Japan) E Sema	6	7
6	(Canada) S Dubois	3	5

Quarterfinals
(Japan) M Hibi	6	1	3
7	(United States) G Min	4	6	6
4	(Japan) K Nara	1
(Japan) E Sema	0^{r}

Semifinals
7	(United States) G Min	6^{6}	0
4	(Japan) K Nara	7^{8}	6

=== Bottom half ===
First round
8	(United States) I Falconi	3	2
Q	(United States) B Morgan	6	6
(United States) A Will	3	1
(United States) S Vickery	6	6
(South Korea) S-r Lee	6	3	2
WC	(United States) J Loeb	3	6	6
Q	(United States) E Lumpkin	5	4
3	(United States) A Riske	7	6
5	(United States) S Rogers	6	6
(United States) A Kiick	2	2
(Australia) S Jones	1	6^{2}
(Thailand) N Lertpitaksinchai	6	7^{7}
(United States) N Gibbs	6	6
LL	(United States) N Melichar	3	3
(United States) M Brengle	2	3
2	(Japan) M Doi	6	6

Second round
Q	(United States) B Morgan	6	6
(United States) S Vickery	4	1
WC	(United States) J Loeb	7^{7}	4	2
3	(United States) A Riske	6^{2}	6	6
5	(United States) S Rogers	6	6
(Thailand) N Lertpitaksinchai	1	1
(United States) N Gibbs	6	6
2	(Japan) M Doi	4	4

Quarterfinals
Q	(United States) B Morgan	6^{7}	3
3	(United States) A Riske	7^{9}	6
5	(United States) S Rogers	6	6
(United States) N Gibbs	2	0

Semifinals
3	(United States) A Riske	4	6	6
5	(United States) S Rogers	6	3	3
