= 2011 Western & Southern Open – Women's singles qualifying =

This article shows the Qualifying Draw for the 2011 Western & Southern Open.

== Players ==
=== Seeds ===
1. (Spain) María José Martínez Sánchez (qualifying competition) (lucky loser)
2. (Czech Republic) Petra Cetkovská (qualified)
3. (Russia) Ksenia Pervak (first round)
4. (Japan) Kimiko Date-Krumm (qualified)
5. (Serbia) Bojana Jovanovski (qualified)
6. (Italy) Alberta Brianti (first round)
7. (Sweden) Sofia Arvidsson (qualifying competition) (lucky loser)
8. (France) Pauline Parmentier (qualifying competition) (lucky loser)
9. (Romania) Monica Niculescu (qualified)
10. (United Kingdom) Elena Baltacha (first round)
11. (France) Mathilde Johansson (first round)
12. (Sweden) Johanna Larsson (qualifying competition)
13. (India) Sania Mirza (qualifying competition)
14. (Latvia) Anastasija Sevastova (qualifying competition)
15. (Ukraine) Kateryna Bondarenko (qualifying competition)
16. (Hungary) Gréta Arn (first round)
17. (Czech Republic) Barbora Záhlavová-Strýcová (first round)
18. (Russia) Alla Kudryavtseva (first round)
19. (France) Virginie Razzano (first round)
20. (Uzbekistan) Akgul Amanmuradova (qualifying competition)
21. (United States) Irina Falconi (first round)
22. (Thailand) Tamarine Tanasugarn (first round)
23. (Spain) Carla Suárez Navarro (first round)
24. (China) Zheng Jie (qualified)

== Qualifiers ==
1. (Croatia) Petra Martić
2. (Czech Republic) Petra Cetkovská
3. (United States) Jill Craybas
4. (Japan) Kimiko Date-Krumm
5. (Serbia) Bojana Jovanovski
6. (Greece) Eleni Daniilidou
7. (South Africa) Chanelle Scheepers
8. (Australia) Anastasia Rodionova
9. (Romania) Monica Niculescu
10. (China) Zhang Shuai
11. (United States) Alexa Glatch
12. (China) Zheng Jie

== Qualifying draw ==
=== First qualifier ===
First round
1	(Spain) María José Martínez Sánchez	6	6
WC	(United Kingdom) Laura Robson	2	4
(Croatia) Petra Martić	6	6
23	(Spain) Carla Suárez Navarro	2	1

Qualifying competition
1	(Spain) María José Martínez Sánchez	4	3
(Croatia) Petra Martić	6	6

=== Second qualifier ===
First round
2	(Czech Republic) Petra Cetkovská	0	6	6
WC	(United States) Madison Brengle	6	3	3
(United States) Melanie Oudin	1	4
15	(Ukraine) Kateryna Bondarenko	6	6

Qualifying competition
2	(Czech Republic) Petra Cetkovská	3	7	6
15	(Ukraine) Kateryna Bondarenko	6	5	1

=== Third qualifier ===
First round
3	(Russia) Ksenia Pervak	4	6	3
(Romania) Sorana Cîrstea	6	3	6
WC	(United States) Jill Craybas	6	1	6
22	(Thailand) Tamarine Tanasugarn	3	6	4

Qualifying competition
(Romania) Sorana Cîrstea	4	6	6^{3}
WC	(United States) Jill Craybas	6	1	7^{7}

=== Fourth qualifier ===
First round
4	(Japan) Kimiko Date-Krumm	7	6
(Austria) Patricia Mayr-Achleitner	5	2
(Germany) Kristina Barrois	6	7^{8}
21	(United States) Irina Falconi	1	6^{6}

Qualifying competition
4	(Japan) Kimiko Date-Krumm	7^{7}	6
(Germany) Kristina Barrois	6^{5}	4

=== Fifth qualifier ===
First round
5	(Serbia) Bojana Jovanovski	6	3	6
(Georgia (country)) Anna Tatishvili	3	6	2
(Japan) Misaki Doi	2	6^{5}
20	(Uzbekistan) Akgul Amanmuradova	6	7^{7}

Qualifying competition
5	(Serbia) Bojana Jovanovski	6	6
20	(Uzbekistan) Akgul Amanmuradova	0	3

=== Sixth qualifier ===
First round
6	(Italy) Alberta Brianti	2	5
(United Kingdom) Anne Keothavong	6	7
(Greece) Eleni Daniilidou	6	6
19	(France) Virginie Razzano	2	2

Qualifying competition
(United Kingdom) Anne Keothavong	7	6^{5}	1^{r}
(Greece) Eleni Daniilidou	5	7^{7}	4

=== Seventh qualifier ===
First round
7	(Sweden) Sofia Arvidsson	6	6
(France) Alizé Cornet	1	3
(South Africa) Chanelle Scheepers	6	6
18	(Russia) Alla Kudryavtseva	1	0

Qualifying competition
7	(Sweden) Sofia Arvidsson	1	4
(South Africa) Chanelle Scheepers	6	6

=== Eighth qualifier ===
First round
8	(France) Pauline Parmentier	4	6	6
WC	(United States) Julia Cohen	6	4	1
(Australia) Anastasia Rodionova	5	6	7
17	(Czech Republic) Barbora Záhlavová-Strýcová	7	4	5

Qualifying competition
8	(France) Pauline Parmentier	5	2
(Australia) Anastasia Rodionova	7	6

=== Ninth qualifier ===
First round
9	(Romania) Monica Niculescu	7	6
(Croatia) Mirjana Lučić	5	0
WC	(United States) Allie Will	3	4
14	(Latvia) Anastasija Sevastova	6	6

Qualifying competition
9	(Romania) Monica Niculescu	4	6	6
14	(Latvia) Anastasija Sevastova	6	2	3

=== Tenth qualifier ===
First round
10	(United Kingdom) Elena Baltacha	4	1
(Belarus) Olga Govortsova	6	6
(China) Zhang Shuai	6	6
16	(Hungary) Gréta Arn	3	4

Qualifying competition
(Belarus) Olga Govortsova	4	7^{7}	4
(China) Zhang Shuai	6	6^{2}	6

=== Eleventh qualifier ===
First round
11	(France) Mathilde Johansson	5	1
WC	(United States) Alexa Glatch	7	6
(United States) Vania King	6^{4}	6	6^{5}
13	(India) Sania Mirza	7^{7}	2	7^{7}

Qualifying competition
WC	(United States) Alexa Glatch	6	6
13	(India) Sania Mirza	2	4

=== Twelfth qualifier ===
First round
12	(Sweden) Johanna Larsson	6	6^{5}	6
(United States) Varvara Lepchenko	1	7^{7}	4
(United States) Coco Vandeweghe	6	2	5
24	(China) Zheng Jie	3	6	7

Qualifying competition
12	(Sweden) Johanna Larsson	1	2
24	(China) Zheng Jie	6	6
