= 2009 JB Group Classic =

The 2009 JB Group Classic is a women's exhibition (no points for the world ranking can be earned) team tennis tournament organized at the beginning of each season. Unlike previous years, the tournament is played in a round robin format.

== Players ==
Team Americas

1. (United States) Venus Williams
2. (Argentina) Gisela Dulko
3. (United States) Coco Vandeweghe

Team Russia

1. (Russia) Vera Zvonareva
2. (Russia) Anna Chakvetadze
3. (Russia) Alexandra Panova

Team Asia Pacific

1. (China) Zheng Jie
2. (India) Sania Mirza
3. (Hong Kong) Zhang Ling

Team Europe

1. (Serbia) Jelena Janković
2. (Hungary) Ágnes Szávay
3. (Portugal) Michelle Larcher de Brito

== Results ==
Champion (Silver Group)	Final (Silver Group)	Semi-final	Final (Golden Group)	Champion (Golden Group)
		Team Russia (1)
	Team Asia Pacific; 0-3		Team Russia (1); 3-0
		Team Asia Pacific
Team Asia Pacific; 3-0				Team Americas; 5-0
		Team Americas
	Team Europe; 1-2		Team Americas; 2-1
		Team Europe (2)

== Semi-finals ==
=== Team Europe vs. Team Americas ===
Team America	2–1	Team Europe
Score by game:
Venus Williams / Coco Vandeweghe	4 – 6, 5–7	Jelena Janković / Michelle Larcher de Brito
Venus Williams	6 – 2, 6–2	Jelena Janković
Gisela Dulko	6 – 4, 6(8) – 7, 6–3	Ágnes Szávay

=== Team Asia Pacific vs. Team Russia ===
Team Asia Pacific	0–3	Team Russia
Score by game:
Zheng Jie	6(3) – 7, 4–6	Vera Zvonareva
Sania Mirza	4 – 6, 4–6	Anna Chakvetadze
Zheng Jie / Zhang Ling	2 – 6, 4–6	Vera Zvonareva / Alexandra Panova

== Silver Group Finals ==
=== Team Europe vs. Team Asia Pacific ===
Team Europe	0–3	Team Asia Pacific
Score by game:
Jelena Janković / Michelle Larcher de Brito	1 – 6, 1–6	Zheng Jie / Sania Mirza
Ágnes Szávay	3 – 6, 4–6	Sania Mirza
Michelle Larcher de Brito	1 – 6, 1–6	Zheng Jie

== Gold Group Finals ==
=== Team Americas vs. Team Russia ===
Team Americas	4–1	Team Russia
Score by game:
Venus Williams	7 – 6(1), 6–3	Anna Chakvetadze
Gisela Dulko	4 – 6, 6 – 0, 3–6	Vera Zvonareva
Gisela Dulko	3 – 6, 6 – 4, 6–4	Anna Chakvetadze
Venus Williams	6 – 2, 6–2	Vera Zvonareva
Venus Williams / Coco Vandeweghe	6 – 4, 6–1	Anna Chakvetadze / Alexandra Panova
	–
