= 2016 Aegon Eastbourne Trophy – Singles =

Singles
- 2016 Aegon Eastbourne Trophy

Final
- Champion: (United States) Alison Riske
- Runner-up: (United Kingdom) Tara Moore
- Score: 4–6, 7–6^{(7–5)}, 6–3

Events
Singles	Doubles
← 2015 ·	Aegon Eastbourne Trophy

Anett Kontaveit was the defending champion, but chose not to participate.

Alison Riske won the title, defeating Tara Moore in the final, 4–6, 7–6^{(7–5)}, 6–3.

== Seeds ==
1. (United States) Alison Riske (champion)
2. (Croatia) Donna Vekić (quarterfinals)
3. (China) Zhang Kailin (first round)
4. (Austria) Tamira Paszek (quarterfinals)
5. (China) Duan Yingying (first round)
6. (Poland) Urszula Radwańska (first round)
7. (China) Wang Yafan (quarterfinals)
8. (France) Océane Dodin (semifinals)

== Main draw ==
=== Key ===
- Q = Qualifier
- WC = Wild card
- LL = Lucky loser
- Alt = Alternate
- SE = Special exempt
- PR = Protected ranking
- ITF = ITF entry
- JE = Junior exempt
- w/o = Walkover
- r = Retired
- d = Defaulted
- SR = Special ranking

=== Finals ===
Semifinals
1	(United States) Alison Riske	7^{7}	7
Q	(Australia) Ashleigh Barty	6^{4}	5
8	(France) Océane Dodin	1	7	4
WC	(United Kingdom) Tara Moore	6	5	6

Final
1	(United States) Alison Riske	4	7^{7}	6
WC	(United Kingdom) Tara Moore	6	6^{5}	3

=== Top half ===
First round
1	(United States) A Riske	6	6
(Czech Republic) T Martincová	2	3
PR	(United States) M Oudin	6^{6}	5
WC	(United Kingdom) K Dunne	7^{8}	7
(Chinese Taipei) K-c Chang	7	6
(China) Y Zhang	5	3
(Italy) M Caregaro	2	5
7	(China) Y Wang	6	7
4	(Austria) T Paszek	7^{10}	6
(United States) M Sanchez	6^{8}	3
PR	(Portugal) M Larcher de Brito	4	6	6
(China) L Zhu	6	4	3
(Slovakia) D Hantuchová	3	6	6
WC	(United Kingdom) L Robson	6	3	1
Q	(Australia) A Barty	6	6
6	(Poland) U Radwańska	3	0

Second round
1	(United States) A Riske	6	6
WC	(United Kingdom) K Dunne	0	2
(Chinese Taipei) K-c Chang	6^{3}	3
7	(China) Y Wang	7^{7}	6
4	(Austria) T Paszek	6	3	6
PR	(Portugal) M Larcher de Brito	4	6	4
(Slovakia) D Hantuchová	3	0^{r}
Q	(Australia) A Barty	6	4

Quarterfinals
1	(United States) A Riske	6	6
7	(China) Y Wang	0	1
4	(Austria) T Paszek	3	2
Q	(Australia) A Barty	6	6

Semifinals
1	(United States) A Riske	7^{7}	7
Q	(Australia) A Barty	6^{4}	5

=== Bottom half ===
First round
8	(France) O Dodin	7	6
(United States) R Anderson	5	4
(United States) J Boserup	6	6
(Brazil) PC Gonçalves	4	1
(Spain) G García Pérez	7^{12}	6
(China) Z Yang	6^{10}	3
WC	(United Kingdom) L Whybourn	2	6	7
3	(China) K Zhang	6	3	5
5	(China) Y Duan	4	1
WC	(United Kingdom) T Moore	6	6
LL	(Australia) A Bai	6	6
Q	(Australia) N Bains	3	4
(Switzerland) C Perrin	4	6	6^{6}
Q	(Australia) S Sanders	6	3	7^{8}
Q	(United States) S Marand	4	2
2	(Croatia) D Vekić	6	6

Second round
8	(France) O Dodin	6	2	6
(United States) J Boserup	3	6	3
(Spain) G García Pérez	6	6^{3}	6
WC	(United Kingdom) L Whybourn	2	7^{7}	3
WC	(United Kingdom) T Moore	6	6
LL	(Australia) A Bai	4	2
Q	(Australia) S Sanders	1	5
2	(Croatia) D Vekić	6	7

Quarterfinals
8	(France) O Dodin	6	4
(Spain) G García Pérez	4	3^{r}
WC	(United Kingdom) T Moore	6	2	6
2	(Croatia) D Vekić	3	6	1

Semifinals
8	(France) O Dodin	1	7	4
WC	(United Kingdom) T Moore	6	5	6
