= 2011 Mutua Madrid Open – Women's singles qualifying =

This article displays the women qualifying draw of the 2011 Mutua Madrid Open.

== Players ==
=== Seeds ===
1. (Romania) Simona Halep (qualified)
2. (Romania) Monica Niculescu (qualified)
3. (France) Alizé Cornet (first round)
4. (Slovenia) Polona Hercog (first round)
5. (Slovakia) Magdaléna Rybáriková (qualifying competition)
6. (Uzbekistan) Akgul Amanmuradova (qualifying competition)
7. (Australia) Anastasia Rodionova (qualifying competition)
8. (India) Sania Mirza (qualified)
9. (Russia) Alla Kudryavtseva (qualifying competition)
10. (South Africa) Chanelle Scheepers (qualified)
11. (Russia) Evgeniya Rodina (first round)
12. (United States) Varvara Lepchenko (qualifying competition)
13. (Austria) Tamira Paszek (withdrew)
14. (Sweden) Sofia Arvidsson (qualified)
15. (United States) Coco Vandeweghe (qualifying competition)
16. (Croatia) Mirjana Lučić (first round)

=== Qualifiers ===
1. (Romania) Simona Halep
2. (Romania) Monica Niculescu
3. (South Africa) Chanelle Scheepers
4. (Belarus) Olga Govortsova
5. (Sweden) Sofia Arvidsson
6. (United States) Vania King
7. (Spain) Nuria Llagostera Vives
8. (India) Sania Mirza

== Qualifying draw ==
=== First qualifier ===
First round
1	(Romania) Simona Halep	6	7
(Colombia) Mariana Duque Mariño	3	6^{6}
(Spain) Beatriz García Vidagany	7	6
11	(Russia) Evgeniya Rodina	6^{4}	2

Qualifying competition
1	(Romania) Simona Halep	6	6
(Spain) Beatriz García Vidagany	4	2

=== Second qualifier ===
First round
2	(Romania) Monica Niculescu	6	6
WC	(Spain) Inés Ferrer-Suárez	4	4
WC	(Spain) Sílvia García Jiménez	1	2
9	(Russia) Alla Kudryavtseva	6	6

Qualifying competition
2	(Romania) Monica Niculescu	2	6	6
9	(Russia) Alla Kudryavtseva	6	4	4

=== Third qualifier ===
First round
3	(France) Alizé Cornet	5	6	6^{5}
WC	(Spain) Leticia Costas-Moreira	7	0	7
Alt	(Russia) Maria Kondratieva	2	3
11	(South Africa) Chanelle Scheepers	6	6

Qualifying competition
WC	(Spain) Leticia Costas-Moreira	3	1
11	(South Africa) Chanelle Scheepers	6	6

=== Fourth qualifier ===
First round
4	(Slovenia) Polona Hercog	3	4
(Belarus) Olga Govortsova	6	6
WC	(Spain) Estrella Cabeza Candela	6^{4}	4
15	(United States) Coco Vandeweghe	7	6

Qualifying competition
(Belarus) Olga Govortsova	6^{3}	7	7
15	(United States) Coco Vandeweghe	7	5	6^{3}

=== Fifth qualifier ===
First round
5	(Slovakia) Magdaléna Rybáriková	6	6
WC	(Belarus) Tatiana Poutchek	3	1
(United States) Sloane Stephens	6^{5}	1
14	(Sweden) Sofia Arvidsson	7	6

Qualifying competition
5	(Slovakia) Magdaléna Rybáriková	5	3
14	(Sweden) Sofia Arvidsson	7	6

=== Sixth qualifier ===
First round
6	(Uzbekistan) Akgul Amanmuradova	6	6
(Chinese Taipei) Chang Kai-chen	3	4
(United States) Vania King	6	6
Alt	(China) Yan Zi	0	3

Qualifying competition
6	(Uzbekistan) Akgul Amanmuradova	2	1
(United States) Vania King	6	6

=== Seventh qualifier ===
First round
7	(Australia) Anastasia Rodionova	6	6
(Australia) Casey Dellacqua	4	2
(Spain) Nuria Llagostera Vives	5	6	6
16	(Croatia) Mirjana Lučić	7	3	1

Qualifying competition
7	(Australia) Anastasia Rodionova	3	7	3
(Spain) Nuria Llagostera Vives	6	5	6

=== Eighth qualifier ===
First round
8	(India) Sania Mirza	1	6	6
(Russia) Alexandra Panova	6	2	1
(Slovakia) Zuzana Kučová	4	4
12	(United States) Varvara Lepchenko	6	6

Qualifying competition
8	(India) Sania Mirza	6	6
12	(United States) Varvara Lepchenko	3	1
