= 2011 Italian Open – Women's singles qualifying =

This article displays the women singles qualifying draw of the 2011 Italian Open (tennis).

== Players ==
=== Seeds ===
1. (Spain) Anabel Medina Garrigues (qualified)
2. (China) Zheng Jie (qualifying competition) (lucky loser)
3. (Slovenia) Polona Hercog (qualified)
4. (Romania) Simona Halep (first round)
5. (Russia) Alla Kudryavtseva (first round)
6. (Spain) Arantxa Parra Santonja (qualified)
7. (Germany) Angelique Kerber (qualifying competition) (lucky loser)
8. (Uzbekistan) Akgul Amanmuradova (first round)
9. (Australia) Anastasia Rodionova (qualified)
10. (South Africa) Chanelle Scheepers (qualified)
11. (France) Alizé Cornet (first round)
12. (Spain) Laura Pous Tió (qualifying competition)
13. (United States) Varvara Lepchenko (qualified)
14. (Austria) Tamira Paszek (qualified)
15. (Belgium) Kirsten Flipkens (first round)
16. (United States) Christina McHale (qualified)

=== Qualifiers ===
1. (Spain) Anabel Medina Garrigues
2. (Australia) Anastasia Rodionova
3. (Slovenia) Polona Hercog
4. (Austria) Tamira Paszek
5. (South Africa) Chanelle Scheepers
6. (Spain) Arantxa Parra Santonja
7. (United States) Varvara Lepchenko
8. (United States) Christina McHale

=== Lucky losers ===
1. (China) Zheng Jie
2. (Germany) Angelique Kerber

== Qualifying draw ==
=== First qualifier ===
First round
1	(Spain) Anabel Medina Garrigues	2	7^{7}	6
(Croatia) Mirjana Lučić	6	6^{2}	1
WC	(Italy) Karin Knapp	4	6	6
15	(Belgium) Kirsten Flipkens	6	2	1

Qualifying competition
1	(Spain) Anabel Medina Garrigues	6	6
WC	(Italy) Karin Knapp	4	2

=== Second qualifier ===
First round
2	(China) Zheng Jie	6	6
WC	(Italy) Anastasia Grymalska	2	2
(United States) Vania King	0	3
9	(Australia) Anastasia Rodionova	6	6

Qualifying competition
2	(China) Zheng Jie	6	3	5
9	(Australia) Anastasia Rodionova	3	6	7

=== Third qualifier ===
First round
3	(Slovenia) Polona Hercog	6	4
(Poland) Urszula Radwańska	3	3^{r}
(Spain) Nuria Llagostera Vives	6	6
11	(France) Alizé Cornet	3	4

Qualifying competition
3	(Slovenia) Polona Hercog	6	7^{7}
(Spain) Nuria Llagostera Vives	1	6^{2}

=== Fourth qualifier ===
First round
4	(Romania) Simona Halep	6^{3}	0
(France) Virginie Razzano	7^{7}	6
PR	(Australia) Casey Dellacqua	4	4
14	(Austria) Tamira Paszek	6	6

Qualifying competition
(France) Virginie Razzano	2	6	3
14	(Austria) Tamira Paszek	6	3	6

=== Fifth qualifier ===
First round
5	(Russia) Alla Kudryavtseva	2	3
(Romania) Mădălina Gojnea	6	6
(Belarus) Olga Govortsova	3	4
10	(South Africa) Chanelle Scheepers	6	6

Qualifying competition
(Romania) Mădălina Gojnea	5	2
10	(South Africa) Chanelle Scheepers	7	6

=== Sixth qualifier ===
First round
6	(Spain) Arantxa Parra Santonja	6	6
WC	(Italy) Nastassya Burnett	4	0
(Ukraine) Kateryna Bondarenko	1	2
12	(Spain) Laura Pous Tió	6	6

Qualifying competition
6	(Spain) Arantxa Parra Santonja	6	7
12	(Spain) Laura Pous Tió	3	5

=== Seventh qualifier ===
First round
7	(Germany) Angelique Kerber	6	6
(Greece) Eleni Daniilidou	0	1
WC	(Italy) Gioia Barbieri	1	4
13	(United States) Varvara Lepchenko	6	6

Qualifying competition
7	(Germany) Angelique Kerber	0	6	2
13	(United States) Varvara Lepchenko	6	4	6

=== Eighth qualifier ===
First round
8	(Uzbekistan) Akgul Amanmuradova	1	0^{r}
(United Kingdom) Heather Watson	6	1
(United States) Coco Vandeweghe	1	4
16	(United States) Christina McHale	6	6

Qualifying competition
(United Kingdom) Heather Watson	6	1	3
16	(United States) Christina McHale	2	6	6
