= 2011 China Open – Women's singles qualifying =

This article displays the women singles qualifying draw of the 2011 China Open (tennis).

== Players ==
=== Seeds ===
1. (Germany) Angelique Kerber (qualifying competition)
2. (South Africa) Chanelle Scheepers (qualified)
3. (Czech Republic) Barbora Záhlavová-Strýcová (qualified)
4. (Croatia) Petra Martić (first round)
5. (United States) Christina McHale (qualified)
6. (Romania) Monica Niculescu (qualified)
7. (Spain) Carla Suárez Navarro (qualified)
8. (Russia) Vera Dushevina (qualifying competition)
9. (Kazakhstan) Galina Voskoboeva (qualifying competition)
10. (France) Pauline Parmentier (first round)
11. (Japan) Kimiko Date-Krumm (moved to Main Draw)
12. (Hungary) Gréta Arn (qualifying competition)
13. (Ukraine) Kateryna Bondarenko (first round)
14. (France) Mathilde Johansson (first round, retired due to a left mid back injury)
15. (United States) Irina Falconi (first round)
16. (Greece) Eleni Daniilidou (qualified)
17. (Poland) Urszula Radwańska (first round)

=== Qualifiers ===
1. (Greece) Eleni Daniilidou
2. (South Africa) Chanelle Scheepers
3. (Czech Republic) Barbora Záhlavová-Strýcová
4. (United Kingdom) Laura Robson
5. (United States) Christina McHale
6. (Romania) Monica Niculescu
7. (Spain) Carla Suárez Navarro
8. (France) Virginie Razzano

== Qualifying draw ==
=== First qualifier ===
First round
1	(Germany) Angelique Kerber	6	4	6
(Belarus) Olga Govortsova	1	6	4
(United States) Coco Vandeweghe	6	3	2
16	(Greece) Eleni Daniilidou	3	6	6

Qualifying competition
1	(Germany) Angelique Kerber	6	3	4
16	(Greece) Eleni Daniilidou	2	6	6

=== Second qualifier ===
First round
2	(South Africa) Chanelle Scheepers	6	6
Alt	(Ukraine) Mariya Koryttseva	2	3
WC	(China) Han Xinyun	1	4
12	(Hungary) Gréta Arn	6	6

Qualifying competition
2	(South Africa) Chanelle Scheepers	6	6
12	(Hungary) Gréta Arn	4	1

=== Third qualifier ===
First round
3	(Czech Republic) Barbora Záhlavová-Strýcová	6	6
(Spain) Arantxa Parra Santonja	2	4
(Russia) Alla Kudryavtseva	6	3	6
13	(Ukraine) Kateryna Bondarenko	4	6	2

Qualifying competition
3	(Czech Republic) Barbora Záhlavová-Strýcová	6^{3}	6	7
(Russia) Alla Kudryavtseva	7^{7}	1	5

=== Fourth qualifier ===
First round
4	(Croatia) Petra Martić	5	1
WC	(United Kingdom) Laura Robson	7	6
(Hungary) Melinda Czink	6	7
15	(United States) Irina Falconi	2	5

Qualifying competition
WC	(United Kingdom) Laura Robson	6	3	7^{7}
(Hungary) Melinda Czink	3	6	6^{4}

=== Fifth qualifier ===
First round
5	(United States) Christina McHale	4	6	6
(Australia) Anastasia Rodionova	6	3	2
(Uzbekistan) Akgul Amanmuradova	6	5	2
9	(Kazakhstan) Galina Voskoboeva	2	7	6

Qualifying competition
5	(United States) Christina McHale	7^{7}	6
9	(Kazakhstan) Galina Voskoboeva	6^{2}	3

=== Sixth qualifier ===
First round
6	(Romania) Monica Niculescu	6	6
(United States) Jill Craybas	0	4
(Japan) Misaki Doi	7	2
14	(France) Mathilde Johansson	5	0^{r}

Qualifying competition
6	(Romania) Monica Niculescu	7^{7}	6
(Japan) Misaki Doi	6^{1}	3

=== Seventh qualifier ===
First round
7	(Spain) Carla Suárez Navarro	6	6
WC	(China) Sun Shengnan	4	4
(Spain) Nuria Llagostera Vives	6	6
10	(France) Pauline Parmentier	1	1

Qualifying competition
7	(Spain) Carla Suárez Navarro	7^{7}	6
(Spain) Nuria Llagostera Vives	6^{3}	4

=== Eighth qualifier ===
First round
8	(Russia) Vera Dushevina	6	6
WC	(China) Lu Jingjing	4	0
(France) Virginie Razzano	6	2	6
17	(Poland) Urszula Radwańska	4	6	4

Qualifying competition
8	(Russia) Vera Dushevina	6^{12}	0
(France) Virginie Razzano	7^{14}	6
