= Oregon Challenger =

ITF Women's Tour
- Event name: Portland
- Location: Portland, Oregon, United States
- Venue: Tualatin Hills Tennis Center
- Category: ITF Women's Circuit
- Surface: Hard
- Draw: 32S/32Q/16D
- Prize money: $50,000
- Website: Official website

The Oregon Challenger was a tournament for professional female tennis players played on outdoor hard courts. The event was classified as a $50,000 ITF Women's Circuit tournament and was held in Portland, Oregon, United States, in 2013.

== Past finals ==
=== Singles ===
Year	Champion	Runner-up	Score
2013	(Japan) Kurumi Nara	(United States) Alison Riske	3–6, 6–3, 6–3

=== Doubles ===
Year	Champions	Runners-up	Score
2013	(United States) Irina Falconi (United States) Nicole Melichar	(United States) Sanaz Marand (United States) Ashley Weinhold	4–6, 6–3, [10–8]
