= Alla Kudryavtseva =

Russian tennis player (born 1987)

Alla Kudryavtseva Алла Кудрявцева
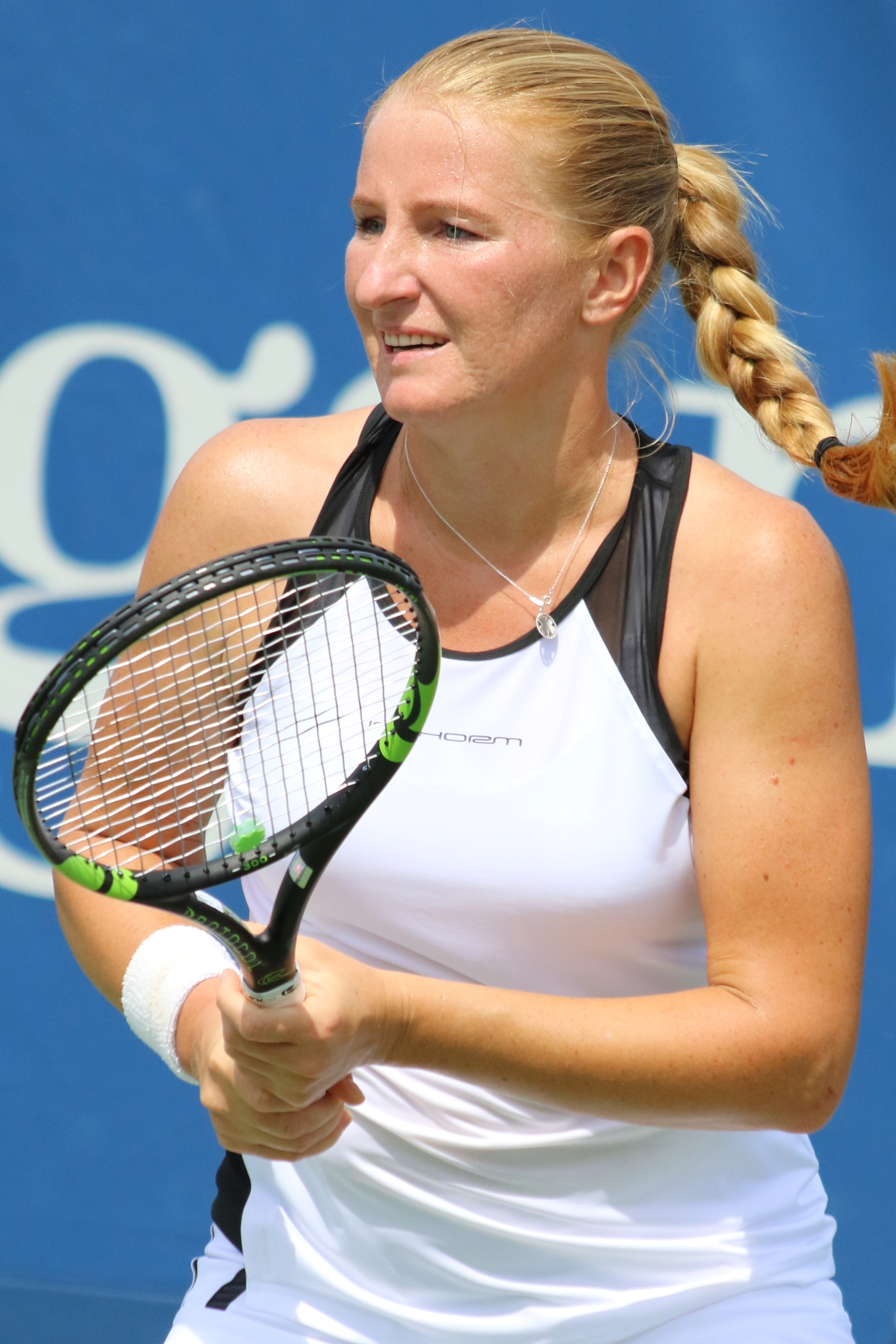
- Kudryavtseva at the 2016 US Open
- Country (sports): Russia
- Born: 3 November 1987 (age 38) Moscow, Soviet Union
- Height: 1.78 m (5 ft 10 in)
- Turned pro: February 2005
- Retired: November 2021
- Plays: Right (two-handed backhand)
- Prize money: $3,245,645

Singles
- Career record: 362–345
- Career titles: 1 WTA, 2 ITF
- Highest ranking: No. 56 (4 October 2010)

Grand Slam singles results
- Australian Open: 2R (2007, 2010, 2014)
- French Open: 3R (2007)
- Wimbledon: 4R (2008)
- US Open: 3R (2011)

Doubles
- Career record: 358–287
- Career titles: 9 WTA, 15 ITF
- Highest ranking: No. 15 (8 September 2014)

Grand Slam doubles results
- Australian Open: QF (2012, 2016)
- French Open: 3R (2010, 2013)
- Wimbledon: QF (2014)
- US Open: QF (2015)

Other doubles tournaments
- Tour Finals: SF (2014)

Grand Slam mixed doubles results
- Australian Open: 2R (2016)
- French Open: 2R (2016)
- Wimbledon: QF (2016)
- US Open: 2R (2014)

Alla Alexandrovna Kudryavtseva (Алла Александровна Кудрявцева; born 3 November 1987) is a retired Russian tennis player.

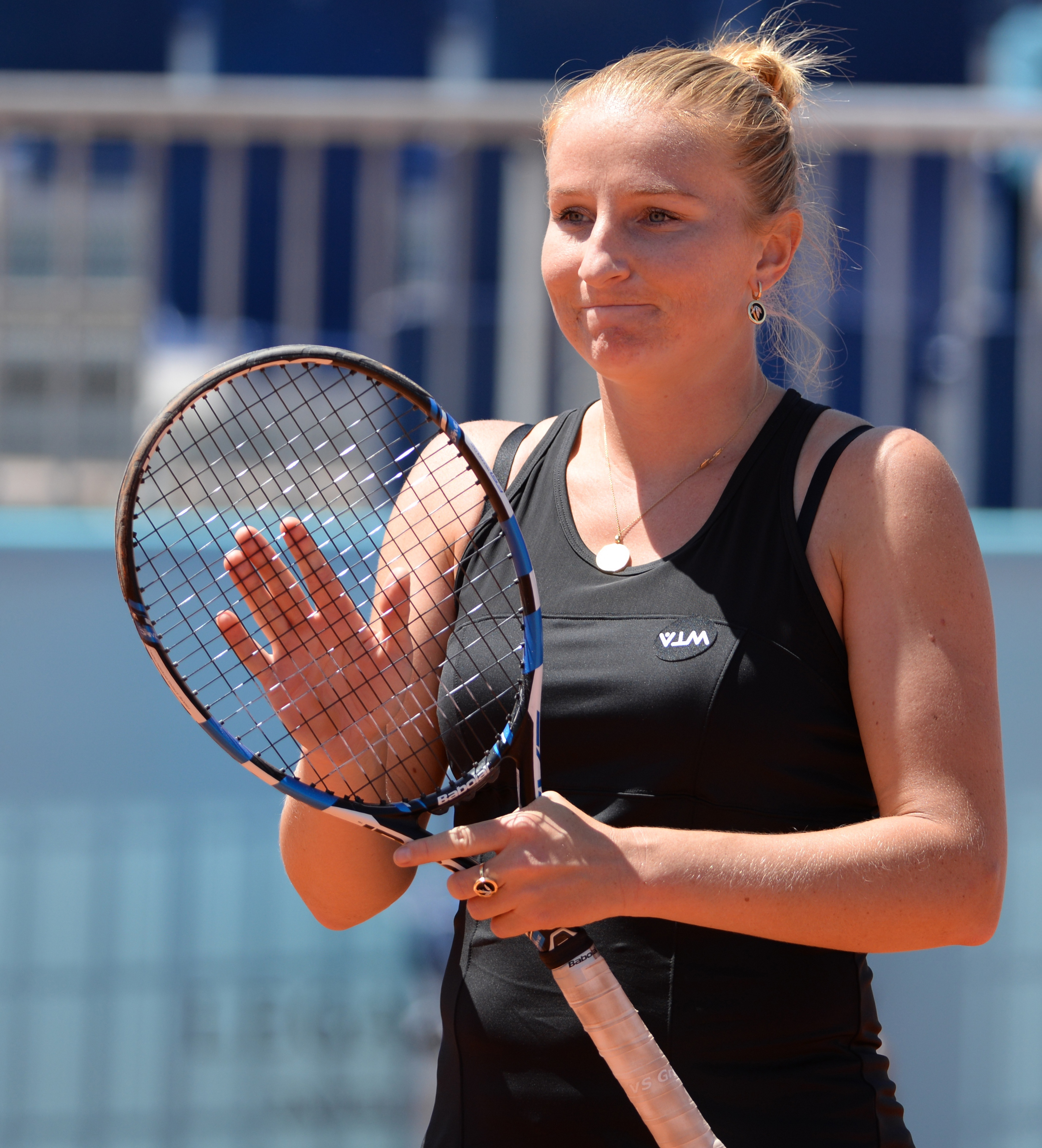
Alla Kudryavtseva, 2015

Kudryavtseva won one singles title and nine doubles titles on the WTA Tour, as well as two singles titles and 15 doubles titles on the ITF Women's Circuit. On 4 October 2010, she reached her best singles ranking of world No. 56. On 8 September 2014, she peaked at No. 15 in the WTA doubles rankings. On 2 November 2021, Kudryavtseva announced on Instagram that she had retired from the sport.

== Career ==
=== Pro tour beginnings ===
Kudryavtseva debuted on the WTA Tour at the 2004 Kremlin Cup, where she could not succeed beyond the qualifying rounds. In the following season, her best WTA Tour result was reaching the first rounds of the Nordic Light Open in Stockholm in singles and the Slovenia Open in doubles.

Her first major appearance was at the 2006 Australian Open, where she could not win a qualification round. The same result was seen at the other three Grand Slam tournaments. Among her more notable results in that season were reaching the singles quarterfinals of the Sunfeast Open in Kolkata, India, and the semifinals in doubles of the Tashkent Open, with Canadian Stéphanie Dubois.

=== 2007–11: Steady progress ===
In 2007, Kudryavtseva qualified for main draw of the Australian Open, reaching the second round in singles and doubles. With Hsieh Su-wei she reached her first WTA final at the Sony Ericsson International in Bangalore, India, losing to a pair from Taiwan. At the French Open, Kudryavtseva qualified for the second Grand Slam in a row and reached the third round, beating Gisela Dulko in the second, and eventually losing to Maria Sharapova. Her best result in singles at a WTA tournament was reaching quarterfinals at Barcelona. At Wimbledon, Kudryavtseva earned first Grand Slam direct entry but drew the eventual champion Venus Williams and lost in three sets. Later that year in Kolkata, Kudryavtseva with Vania King won her first title.

In 2008, partnering with Anastasia Pavlyuchenkova, she reached the final at the Internazionali di Palermo, losing to Sara Errani and Nuria Llagostera Vives. She played alongside several doubles partners, including King and Vera Dushevina. In singles, Kudryavtseva fought her way through the fourth round of Wimbledon, defeating third-seeded Sharapova in the second round, which is to date her best result in a Grand Slam singles event.

In 2009, Kudryavtseva progressed in doubles in the next season, climbing with Ekaterina Makarova to the final of the Premier Mandatory China Open, eventually losing to Hsieh Su-wei and Peng Shuai. Kudryavtseva/Dushevina reached the quarterfinals of the Rogers Cup.

In 2010, the Russian two times in succession reached the finals in singles, becoming champion in Tashkent, defeating Elena Vesnina in the final, and before that runner-up in Guangzhou, losing to Jarmila Groth. As a result, she reached a career-high ranking of 56 and finished the year at No. 61 in the world in singles. With her new partner Anastasia Rodionova, she also reached two finals in doubles, winning the Rosmalen Open.

In the 2011 season, she and Olga Govortsova reached three WTA Tour finals at the Cellular South Cup, Birmingham Classic and Washington Open, the first two of which they won.

Kudryavtseva and Makarova became quarterfinalists of the 2012 Australian Open, eventually losing to Errani/Vinci; this became her best result in a major doubles tournament. However, her 2012 season was rather poor, eventually skipping the WTA Tour for ITF tournaments at season end.

=== 2013: Breakthrough in doubles ===
The back and forth switching of ITF and WTA tournaments continued until showing with Rodionova significant results since late April. They won the Challenge Bell, and also reached the final of the Kremlin Cup. Furthermore, the two became semifinalists at the Premier 5 events Italian Open and Pan Pacific Open. Kudryavtseva returned to the top 50 in doubles as a result of her successful season.

=== 2014 ===
Kudryavtseva/Rodionova continued their successful partnership starting the year with a title at Brisbane. The second title came in February in Dubai, where they defeated Kops-Jones and Spears in the final. Their biggest Grand Slam tournament result came at Wimbledon, where they lost in the quarterfinal against Babos/Mladenovic. They also reached the semifinals in Cincinnati and Beijing, the quarterfinals in Miami, Doha and Wuhan. Their last title of the season came at an international event in Tianjin, which also led them into the WTA Championships in Singapore.

In their debut Tour Championships in Singapore appearing Kudryavtseva/Rodionova beat a fourth-seeded team of Makarova/Vesnina, 4–6, 6–2, [10–6]. In the semifinals, they were defeated by title defenders Hsieh Su-wei/Peng Shuai, 6–1, 6–4. As a consequence, Kudryavtseva pushed into the top 20 in doubles, reaching a career-high ranking of 15.

In addition to the success in doubles, Kudryavtseva qualified for nine singles events including three Grand Slam tournaments; Australian Open, French Open and Wimbledon. She was able to finish the year in the top 100, at No. 96, for the first time since 2010.

=== 2015 ===
Kudryavtseva started the season with a quarterfinal showing at Brisbane in singles defeating world No. 23, Karolína Plíšková, in the second round. She paired with Anastasia Pavlyuchenkova of Russia in hopes for Olympics and reached semifinals at Dubai, Charleston, Rome and Washington. They also reached quarterfinals of the US Open but fell one spot short of qualifying for the WTA Finals and went to Singapore as an alternate. Kudryavtseva finished the year at 170 in singles and 29 in doubles.

== Performance timelines ==
Key
W	F	SF	QF	#R	RR	Q#	P#	DNQ	A	Z#	PO	G	S	B	NMS	NTI	P	NH

(W) winner; (F) finalist; (SF) semifinalist; (QF) quarterfinalist; (#R) rounds 4, 3, 2, 1; (RR) round-robin stage; (Q#) qualification round; (P#) preliminary round; (DNQ) did not qualify; (A) absent; (Z#) Davis/Fed Cup Zonal Group (with number indication) or (PO) play-off; (G) gold, (S) silver or (B) bronze Olympic/Paralympic medal; (NMS) not a Masters tournament; (NTI) not a Tier I tournament; (P) postponed; (NH) not held; (SR) strike rate (events won / competed); (W–L) win–loss record.
To avoid confusion and double counting, these charts are updated at the conclusion of a tournament or when the player's participation has ended.

Only main-draw results in WTA Tour, Grand Slam tournaments, Fed Cup and Olympic Games are included in win–loss records.

=== Singles ===
Tournament	2005	2006	2007	2008	2009	2010	2011	2012	2013	2014	2015	2016	2017	2018	SR	W–L
Grand Slam tournaments
Australian Open	A	Q1	2R	1R	1R	2R	1R	1R	Q1	2R	1R	Q1	A	A	0 / 8	3–8
French Open	A	Q1	3R	1R	2R	1R	1R	Q1	Q3	Q1	Q1	A	Q1	A	0 / 5	3–5
Wimbledon	A	Q1	1R	4R	1R	2R	1R	Q1	Q2	1R	Q1	Q1	Q2	A	0 / 6	4–6
US Open	A	Q1	1R	1R	1R	1R	3R	1R	Q1	2R	Q3	Q1	Q2	A	0 / 7	3–7
Win–loss	0–0	0–0	3–4	3–4	1–4	2–4	2–4	0–2	0–0	2–3	0–1	0–0	0–0	0–0	0 / 26	13–26
WTA 1000
Dubai / Qatar Open (Note: The first Premier 5 event of the year has switched back and forth between the Dubai Tennis Championships and the Qatar Total Open since 2009. Dubai was classified as a Premier 5 event from 2009 to 2011 before being succeeded by Doha for the 2012–2014 period. In 2015, Dubai regained its Premier 5 status while Doha was demoted to Premier status. The Premier 5 tournaments were reclassified as WTA 1000 tournaments in 2021.)	NMS			A	A	A	A	Q1	A	1R	Q1	A	A	A	0 / 1	0–1
Indian Wells Open	A	A	Q1	2R	1R	A	2R	Q2	A	Q2	1R	A	A	A	0 / 4	2–4
Miami Open	A	A	Q1	Q2	2R	2R	1R	Q1	A	Q1	Q1	A	A	A	0 / 3	2–3
Berlin / Madrid Open (Note: In 2009, the Berlin Open was replaced by the Madrid Open. The Premier Mandatory tournaments were reclassified as WTA 1000 tournaments in 2021.)	A	A	A	A	Q2	Q2	Q2	Q2	A	Q1	Q1	A	Q1	Q1	0 / 0	0–0
Italian Open	A	A	A	Q1	A	1R	Q1	Q1	A	A	Q1	A	A	A	0 / 1	0–1
Canadian Open	A	A	A	2R	2R	Q1	Q1	Q2	A	A	Q2	2R	A	A	0 / 3	3–3
Cincinnati Open	NMS				Q2	1R	Q1	A	A	A	A	A	A	A	0 / 1	0–1
Pan Pacific / Wuhan Open (Note: In 2014, the Toray Pan Pacific Open was downgraded to a Premier event and replaced by the Wuhan Open. The Premier 5 tournaments were reclassified as WTA 1000 tournaments in 2021.)	A	A	A	A	Q2	A	A	A	A	A	A	A	A	A	0 / 0	0–0
China Open	NMS				1R	1R	Q2	A	A	Q2	Q1	A	Q1	A	0 / 2	0–2
Career statistics
	2005	2006	2007	2008	2009	2010	2011	2012	2013	2014	2015	2016	2017	2018		
Tournaments	0	2	14	18	21	22	23	6	6	15	8	4	2	0	141	
Titles	0	0	0	0	0	1	0	0	0	0	0	0	0	0	1	
Finals	0	0	0	0	0	2	0	0	0	0	0	0	0	0	2	
Win–loss	0–0	1–2	7–14	12–18	12–21	18–21	14–23	2–6	5–6	8–15	2–8	5–4	0–2	0–0	86–140	
Year-end ranking	216	138	90	71	90	61	104	208	176	98	170	138	351	681		

=== Doubles ===
Tournament	2005	2006	2007	2008	2009	2010	2011	2012	2013	2014	2015	2016	2017	2018	2019	2020	2021	SR	W–L
Grand Slam tournaments
Australian Open	A	A	2R	2R	2R	2R	3R	QF	1R	1R	3R	QF	A	2R	A	A	A	0 / 11	14–11
French Open	A	A	2R	1R	1R	3R	2R	1R	3R	1R	2R	1R	2R	1R	A	A	A	0 / 12	8–12
Wimbledon	A	A	1R	3R	3R	3R	2R	1R	1R	QF	3R	2R	1R	1R	A	NH	A	0 / 12	13–12
US Open	A	A	1R	1R	3R	2R	3R	1R	2R	3R	QF	3R	2R	A	A	2R	A	0 / 12	14–12
Win–loss	0–0	0–0	2–4	3–4	5–4	6–4	5–4	3–4	2–4	5–4	8–4	6–4	2–3	1–3	0–0	1–1	0–0	0 / 47	49–47
Year-end championships
Tour Championships	DNQ									SF	DNQ							0 / 1	1–1
WTA 1000
Dubai / Qatar Open	NMS			A	A	QF	A	2R	A	QF	SF	A	A	2R	A	A	A	0 / 5	9–5
Indian Wells Open	A	A	2R	1R	3R	A	1R	1R	A	1R	2R	QF	A	1R	A	NH	A	0 / 9	6–9
Miami Open	A	A	A	1R	1R	2R	1R	1R	A	QF	2R	QF	A	QF	A	NH	1R	0 / 10	8–10
Berlin / Madrid Open	A	A	A	A	2R	1R	1R	1R	A	1R	2R	SF	1R	1R	A	NH	1R	0 / 10	5–10
Italian Open	A	A	A	2R	A	1R	1R	1R	SF	1R	SF	1R	A	2R	A	A	1R	0 / 10	8–10
Canadian Open	A	A	A	2R	QF	1R	1R	1R	2R	1R	A	1R	A	A	A	NH	A	0 / 8	4–8
Cincinnati Open	NMS				1R	2R	2R	1R	2R	SF	A	A	2R	A	A	A	A	0 / 7	7–7
Pan Pacific / Wuhan Open	A	A	A	A	A	A	A	A	SF	QF	2R	A	A	A	A	NH		0 / 3	5–3
China Open	NMS				F	1R	1R	A	1R	SF	2R	A	1R	A	A	NH		0 / 7	8–7
Career statistics
Tournaments	1	6	11	18	22	25	24	18	19	25	21	14	12	19	0	7	7	221	
Titles	0	0	1	0	0	1	2	0	1	3	0	0	0	1	0	0	0	9	
Finals	0	0	2	1	1	2	3	0	2	4	0	1	1	2	0	0	0	19	
Overall win–loss	0–1	4–6	8–11	16–18	18–22	24–23	23–22	9–17	24–18	38–20	28–19	24–14	9–12	12–7	0–0	2–6	2–7	241–232	
Year-end ranking	210	115	56	49	33	41	39	73	31	18	29	25	71	54	–	341			

== WTA 1000 finals ==
=== Doubles: 1 (runner-up) ===
Result	Year	Tournament	Surface	Partner	Opponents	Score
Loss	2009	China Open	Hard	(Russia) Ekaterina Makarova	(Chinese Taipei) Hsieh Su-wei; (China) Peng Shuai	3–6, 1–6

== WTA Tour finals ==
=== Singles: 2 (1 title, 1 runner-up) ===
Legend
WTA 500 tournaments
WTA 250 tournaments (1–1)

Result	W–L	Date	Tournament	Tier	Surface	Opponent	Score
Loss	0–1	Sep 2010	Guangzhou Open, China	International (Note: In 2009, the WTA Tier II tournaments were reclassified as WTA Premier tournaments, while the WTA Tier III tournaments, WTA Tier IV tournaments and WTA Tier V tournaments were reclassified as WTA International tournaments. In 2021, the WTA Premier tournaments were reclassified as WTA 500 tournaments and WTA International tournaments as WTA 250 tournaments.)	Hard	(Australia) Jarmila Groth	1–6, 4–6
Win	1–1	Sep 2010	Tashkent Open, Uzbekistan	International	Hard	(Russia) Elena Vesnina	6–4, 6–4

=== Doubles: 20 (9 titles, 11 runner-ups) ===
Legend
WTA 1000 (0–1)
WTA 500 (3–3)
WTA 250 (6–7)

Result	W–L	Date	Tournament	Tier	Surface	Partner	Opponents	Score
Loss	0–1	Feb 2007	Bangalore Open, India	Tier III	Hard	(Chinese Taipei) Hsieh Su-wei	(Chinese Taipei) Chan Yung-jan; (Chinese Taipei) Chuang Chia-jung	7–6^{(7–4)}, 2–6, [9–11]
Win	1–1	Sep 2007	Sunfeast Open, India	Tier III	Hard	(United States) Vania King	(Italy) Alberta Brianti; (Ukraine) Mariya Koryttseva	6–1, 6–4
Loss	1–2	Jul 2008	Palermo Ladies Open, Italy	Tier IV	Clay	(Russia) Anastasia Pavlyuchenkova	(Italy) Sara Errani; (Spain) Nuria Llagostera Vives	6–2, 6–7^{(1–7)}, [4–10]
Loss	1–3	Oct 2009	China Open, China	Premier M (Note: THe WTA Tier I tournaments were reclassified as WTA Premier Mandatory & 5 in 2009 and later as WTA 1000 tournaments in 2021.)	Hard	(Russia) Ekaterina Makarova	(Chinese Taipei) Hsieh Su-wei (China) Peng Shuai	3–6, 1–6
Loss	1–4	May 2010	Internationaux de Strasbourg, France	International	Clay	(Australia) Anastasia Rodionova	(France) Alizé Cornet; (United States) Vania King	6–3, 4–6, [7–10]
Win	2–4	Jun 2010	Rosmalen Open, Netherlands	International	Grass	(Australia) Anastasia Rodionova	(United States) Vania King (Kazakhstan) Yaroslava Shvedova	3–6, 6–3, [10–8]
Win	3–4	Feb 2011	Memphis Indoors, United States	International	Hard (i)	(Belarus) Olga Govortsova	(Czech Republic) Andrea Hlaváčková; (Czech Republic) Lucie Hradecká	6–3, 4–6, [10–8]
Win	4–4	Jun 2011	Birmingham Classic, United Kingdom	International	Grass	(Belarus) Olga Govortsova	(Italy) Sara Errani (Italy) Roberta Vinci	1–6, 6–1, [10–5]
Loss	4–5	Jul 2011	Washington Open, United States	International	Hard	(Belarus) Olga Govortsova	(India) Sania Mirza (Kazakhstan) Yaroslava Shvedova	3–6, 3–6
Win	5–5	Sep 2013	Tournoi de Québec, Canada	International	Carpet (i)	(Australia) Anastasia Rodionova	(Czech Republic) Andrea Hlaváčková (Czech Republic) Lucie Hradecká	6–4, 6–3
Loss	5–6	Oct 2013	Kremlin Cup, Russia	Premier	Hard (i)	(Australia) Anastasia Rodionova	(Russia) Svetlana Kuznetsova; (Australia) Samantha Stosur	1–6, 6–1, [8–10]
Win	6–6	Jan 2014	Brisbane International, Australia	Premier	Hard	(Australia) Anastasia Rodionova	(France) Kristina Mladenovic; (Kazakhstan) Galina Voskoboeva	6–3, 6–1
Loss	6–7	Feb 2014	Pattaya Open, Thailand	International	Hard	(Australia) Anastasia Rodionova	(China) Peng Shuai (China) Zhang Shuai	6–3, 6–7^{(5–7)}, [6–10]
Win	7–7	Feb 2014	Dubai Championships, UAE	Premier	Hard	(Australia) Anastasia Rodionova	(United States) Raquel Kops-Jones (United States) Abigail Spears	6–2, 5–7, [10–8]
Win	8–7	Oct 2014	Tianjin Open, China	International	Hard	(Australia) Anastasia Rodionova	(Romania) Sorana Cîrstea (Slovenia) Andreja Klepač	6–7^{(6–8)}, 6–2, [10–8]
Loss	8–8	Jun 2016	Eastbourne International, United Kingdom	Premier	Grass	(United States) Vania King	(Czech Republic) Karolína Plíšková (Czech Republic) Barbora Strýcová	3–6, 6–7^{(1–7)}
Loss	8–9	Sep 2016	Tournoi de Québec, Canada	International	Carpet (i)	(Russia) Alexandra Panova	(Czech Republic) Andrea Hlaváčková (Czech Republic) Lucie Hradecká	6–7^{(2–7)}, 6–7^{(2–7)}
Loss	8–10	Jul 2017	Jiangxi International, China	International	Hard	(Australia) Arina Rodionova	(China) Jiang Xinyu (China) Tang Qianhui	3–6, 2–6
Loss	8–11	Feb 2018	St. Petersburg Trophy, Russia	Premier	Hard (i)	(Slovenia) Katarina Srebotnik	(Switzerland) Timea Bacsinszky (Russia) Vera Zvonareva	6–2, 1–6, [3–10]
Win	9–11	Apr 2018	Charleston Open, United States	Premier	Clay (green)	(Slovenia) Katarina Srebotnik	(Slovenia) Andreja Klepač (Spain) María José Martínez Sánchez	6–3, 6–3

== ITF Circuit finals ==
=== Singles: 10 (2 titles, 8 runner-ups) ===
Legend
$80,000 tournaments (0–2)
$60,000 tournaments (0–3)
$25,000 tournaments (1–3)
$15,000 tournaments (1–0)

Result	W–L	Date	Tournament	Tier	Surface	Opponent	Score
Loss		Jul 2005	ITF Felixstowe, United Kingdom	25,000	Grass	(Australia) Jarmila Wolfe	5–7, 1–6
Win		Sep 2005	ITF Balashikha, Russia	25,000	Clay	(Russia) Vasilisa Bardina	2–6, 7–5, 6–4
Loss		Nov 2005	ITF Busan, South Korea	50,000 (Note: 60,000 in 2017.)	Hard	(South Korea) Kim So-jung	6–3, 1–6, 2–6
Loss		Mar 2006	ITF Las Palmas, Spain	25,000	Clay	(Belgium) Kirsten Flipkens	1–6, 4–6
Loss		Mar 2006	ITF St. Petersburg, Russia	25,000	Hard (i)	(Italy) Alberta Brianti	1–6, 4–6
Loss		Oct 2006	ITF Beijing, China	50,000	Hard	(New Zealand) Marina Erakovic	2–6, 1–6
Loss		Apr 2007	Dothan Classic, United States	75,000 (Note: 75,000 in 2017.)	Clay	(Chinese Taipei) Latisha Chan	4–6, 2–6
Win		Jan 2013	ITF Eilat, İsrael	10,000 (Note: 10,000 tournaments were reclassified as $15,000 in 2017. However, there were some $15,000 even before 2017.)	Hard	(Romania) Raluca Olaru	6–7^{(4)}, 6–3, 6–2
Loss		Jun 2015	Eastbourne Trophy, United Kingdom	50,000	Grass	(Estonia) Anett Kontaveit	6–7^{(4)}, 6–7^{(2)}
Loss		Feb 2016	Launceston International, Australia	75,000	Hard	(China) Han Xinyun	1–6, 1–6

=== Doubles: 19 (15 titles, 4 runner-ups) ===
Legend
$100,000 tournaments (2–0)
$80,000 tournaments (1–0)
$60,000 tournaments (5–0)
$25,000 tournaments (4–4)
$15,000 tournaments (3–0)

Result	W–L	Date	Tournament	Tier	Surface	Partner	Opponents	Score
Win		Mar 2004	ITF Melilla, Spain	10,000	Hard	(Russia) Nina Bratchikova	(Russia) Anastasia Dvornikova (Ukraine) Irena Nossenko	7–5, 6–3
Win		Apr 2004	ITF Bol, Croatia	10,000	Clay	(Russia) Anna Bastrikova	(Belarus) Victoria Azarenka (Belarus) Olga Govortsova	6–4, 6–1
Loss		Aug 2004	ITF Balashikha, Russia	25,000	Hard (i)	(Ukraine) Olena Antypina	(Russia) Maria Goloviznina (Russia) Elena Vesnina	5–7, 4–6
Loss		Mar 2005	ITF St. Petersburg, Russia	25,000	Hard (i)	(Russia) Ekaterina Kosminskaya	(Russia) Nina Bratchikova (Russia) Ekaterina Makarova	6–7^{(2)}, 2–6
Loss		Jul 2005	ITF Felixstowe, United Kingdom	25,000	Grass	(Australia) Jarmila Wolfe	(New Zealand) Leanne Baker (Italy) Francesca Lubiani	1–6, 6–4, 2–3 ret.
Win		Mar 2006	ITF Las Palmas, Spain	25,000	Hard	(Russia) Nina Bratchikova	(Poland) Karolina Kosińska (Poland) Alicja Rosolska	6–1, 6–3
Win		Mar 2006	ITF Telde, Spain	25,000	Clay	(Russia) Nina Bratchikova	(Italy) Sara Errani (Italy) Giulia Gabba	6–1, 6–1
Loss		Mar 2006	ITF St. Petersburg, Russia	25,000	Hard (i)	(Ukraine) Yuliya Beygelzimer	(Russia) Anastasia Pavlyuchenkova (Russia) Yulia Solonitskaya	1–6, 4–6
Win		May 2006	Open Saint-Gaudens, France	50,000	Clay	(Croatia) Ivana Abramović	(Argentina) María José Argeri (Brazil) Letícia Sobral	6–2, 6–0
Win		Nov 2006	ITF Shenzhen, China	50,000	Hard	(Chinese Taipei) Hsieh Su-wei	(Uzbekistan) Akgul Amanmuradova (Uzbekistan) Iroda Tulyaganova	2–0 ret.
Win		Nov 2007	ITF Minsk, Belarus	50,000	Hard	(Russia) Anastasia Pavlyuchenkova	(Serbia) Vesna Manasieva (Russia) Ekaterina Lopes	6–0, 6–2
Win		Nov 2007	Internationaux de Poitiers, France	100,000	Hard (i)	(Russia) Anastasia Pavlyuchenkova	(Poland) Klaudia Jans (Poland) Alicja Rosolska	2–6 6–4, [10–1]
Win		Oct 2012	Saguenay Challenger, Canada	50,000	Hard (i)	(Canada) Gabriela Dabrowski	(Canada) Sharon Fichman (Canada) Marie-Ève Pelletier	6–2, 6–2
Win		Nov 2012	Toronto Challenger, Canada	50,000	Hard (i)	(Canada) Gabriela Dabrowski	(Canada) Eugenie Bouchard (United States) Jessica Pegula	6–2, 7–6^{(2)}
Win		Jan 2013	ITF Eilat, Israel	10,000	Hard	(Romania) Raluca Olaru	(Belarus) Ilona Kremen (Turkey) Pemra Özgen	6–3, 6–3
Win		Feb 2013	Vanessa Phillips Tournament, Israel	75,000	Hard	(Russia) Elina Svitolina	(Italy) Corinna Dentoni (Belarus) Aliaksandra Sasnovich	6–1, 6–3
Win		Mar 2013	ITF Irapuato, Mexico	25,000	Clay	(Ukraine) Olga Savchuk	(Serbia) Aleksandra Krunić (Switzerland) Amra Sadiković	4–6, 6–2, [10–6]
Win		Apr 2017	ITF Jackson, United States	25,000	Clay	(Germany) Anna Zaja	(Chile) Alexa Guarachi (United States) Ronit Yurovsky	6–2, 6–0
Win		Jun 2017	Ilkley Trophy, United Kingdom	100,000	Grass	(Russia) Anna Blinkova	(Poland) Paula Kania (Belgium) Maryna Zanevska	6–1, 6–4
