= Aegon Eastbourne Trophy =

ITF Women's Tour
- Event name: Eastbourne
- Location: Eastbourne, United Kingdom
- Venue: International Tennis Center
- Category: ITF Women's Circuit
- Surface: Grass
- Draw: 32S/32Q/16D
- Prize money: $50,000
- Website: Official website

The Aegon Eastbourne Trophy was a tournament for professional female tennis players played on outdoor grass courts. The event was classified as a $50,000 ITF Women's Circuit tournament and was held in Eastbourne, United Kingdom, from 2015 to 2016.

== Past finals ==
=== Singles ===
Year	Champion	Runner-up	Score
2016	(United States) Alison Riske	(United Kingdom) Tara Moore	4–6, 7–6^{(7–5)}, 6–3
2015	(Estonia) Anett Kontaveit	(Russia) Alla Kudryavtseva	7–6^{(7–4)}, 7–6^{(7–2)}

=== Doubles ===
Year	Champions	Runners-up	Score
2016	(China) Yang Zhaoxuan (China) Zhang Kailin	(United States) Asia Muhammad (United States) Maria Sanchez	7–6^{(7–5)}, 6–1
2015	(United States) Shelby Rogers (United States) Coco Vandeweghe	(United Kingdom) Jocelyn Rae (United Kingdom) Anna Smith	7–5, 7–6^{(7–1)}
