= 2013 The Oaks Club Challenger =

- Date: March 25–31
- Edition: 5th
- Location: Osprey, Florida, United States

Champions

Singles
- (Colombia) Mariana Duque Mariño

Doubles
- (United States) Raquel Kops-Jones / (United States) Abigail Spears
← 2012 ·	The Oaks Club Challenger	· 2014 →

The 2013 The Oaks Club Challenger is a professional tennis tournament played on outdoor clay courts. It is the fifth edition of the tournament which is part of the 2013 ITF Women's Circuit, offering a total of $50,000 in prize money. It takes place in Osprey, Florida, United States, on March 25–31, 2013.

== WTA entrants ==
=== Seeds ===
Country	Player	Rank^{1}	Seed
CZE	Lucie Hradecká	54	1
CZE	Andrea Hlaváčková	66	2
UKR	Lesia Tsurenko	74	3
NED	Arantxa Rus	75	4
RUS	Olga Puchkova	77	5
FRA	Pauline Parmentier	79	6
FRA	Mathilde Johansson	83	7
USA	Melanie Oudin	88	8

- ^{1} Rankings are as of March 18, 2013

=== Other entrants ===
The following players received wildcards into the singles main draw:

- (United States) Irina Falconi
- (Ukraine) Olga Ianchuk
- (United States) Chalena Scholl
- (United States) Chiara Scholl

The following players received entry from the qualifying draw:

- (United States) Jennifer Brady
- (Colombia) Catalina Castaño
- (United States) Jill Craybas
- (Colombia) Mariana Duque Mariño

The following player received entry into the singles main draw as a Lucky Loser:

- (United States) Madison Brengle

The following player received entry by a Junior Exempt:

- (Czech Republic) Kateřina Siniaková

== Champions ==
=== Singles ===
- (Colombia) Mariana Duque Mariño def. (Spain) Estrella Cabeza Candela, 7–6^{(7–2)}, 6–1

=== Doubles ===
- (United States) Raquel Kops-Jones / (United States) Abigail Spears def. (Paraguay) Verónica Cepede Royg / (Spain) Inés Ferrer Suárez, 6–1, 6–3
