= 2015 Wilde Lexus Women's USTA Pro Circuit Event – Singles =

Singles
- 2015 Wilde Lexus Women's USTA Pro Circuit Event

Final
- Champion: (United States) Alexa Glatch
- Runner-up: (United States) Madison Brengle
- Score: 6–2, 6–7^{(6–8)}, 6–3

Events
| Singles | Doubles |
| ← 2014 · | Wilde Lexus Women's USTA Pro Circuit Event | · 2016 → |

Anna Schmiedlová was the defending champion but chose not to participate.

Wildcard Alexa Glatch won the title, defeating the top seed Madison Brengle in an all-American final, 6–2, 6–7^{(6–8)}, 6–3.

== Seeds ==
1. (United States) Madison Brengle (final)
2. (Slovakia) Jana Čepelová (first round)
3. (United States) Shelby Rogers (quarterfinals)
4. (Russia) Evgeniya Rodina (semifinals)
5. (United States) Grace Min (second round)
6. (Romania) Andreea Mitu (first round)
7. (Spain) Lourdes Domínguez Lino (first round)
8. (China) Zhu Lin (first round)

== Main draw ==
=== Key ===
- Q = Qualifier
- WC = Wild card
- LL = Lucky loser
- Alt = Alternate
- SE = Special exempt
- PR = Protected ranking
- ITF = ITF entry
- JE = Junior exempt
- w/o = Walkover
- r = Retired
- d = Defaulted
- SR = Special ranking

=== Finals ===
Semifinals
1 | (United States) Madison Brengle | 6 | 6
LL | (Ukraine) Anhelina Kalinina | 4 | 2
4 | (Russia) Evgeniya Rodina | 1 | 2
WC | (United States) Alexa Glatch | 6 | 6

Final
1 | (United States) Madison Brengle | 2 | 7^{8} | 3
WC | (United States) Alexa Glatch | 6 | 6^{6} | 6

=== Top half ===
First round
1 | (United States) M Brengle | 6 | 6
(Czech Republic) B Krejčíková | 2 | 2
(Argentina) P Ormaechea | 5 | 6 | 2
(Israel) J Glushko | 7 | 0 | 6
(Montenegro) D Kovinić | 6 | 7
(Romania) S Cîrstea | 1 | 5
(United States) L Chirico | 6 | 6
6 | (Romania) A Mitu | 2 | 2
3 | (United States) S Rogers | 6 | 2 | 6
(Bulgaria) S Karatantcheva | 1 | 6 | 4
Q | (Japan) N Osaka | 6 | 7^{7}
(Paraguay) V Cepede Royg | 4 | 6^{5}
LL | (Ukraine) A Kalinina | 6 | 6
(Serbia) J Jakšić | 3 | 0
(Slovakia) K Kučová | 7 | 7^{7}
8 | (China) L Zhu | 5 | 6^{3}

Second round
1 | (United States) M Brengle | 6 | 6
(Israel) J Glushko | 2 | 2
(Montenegro) D Kovinić | 4 | 3
(United States) L Chirico | 6 | 6
3 | (United States) S Rogers | 6 | 6
Q | (Japan) N Osaka | 4 | 4
LL | (Ukraine) A Kalinina | 6 | 5 | 7^{10}
(Slovakia) K Kučová | 1 | 7 | 6^{8}

Quarterfinals
1 | (United States) M Brengle | 6 | 4 | 6
(United States) L Chirico | 3 | 6 | 3
3 | (United States) S Rogers | 3 | 2
LL | (Ukraine) A Kalinina | 6 | 6

Semifinals
1 | (United States) M Brengle | 6 | 6
LL | (Ukraine) A Kalinina | 4 | 2

=== Bottom half ===
First round
5 | (United States) G Min | 6 | 6
Q | (Argentina) M Irigoyen | 2 | 1
Q | (Turkey) İ Soylu | 6 | 1 | 6
JE | (Russia) D Kasatkina | 4 | 6 | 4
WC | (United States) S Crawford | 5 | 0
Q | (Netherlands) A Rus | 7 | 6
(United States) S Vickery | 3 | 4
4 | (Russia) E Rodina | 6 | 6
7 | (Spain) L Domínguez Lino | 3 | 4
WC | (United States) A Glatch | 6 | 6
(Turkey) Ç Büyükakçay | 6 | 6
(Austria) P Mayr-Achleitner | 1 | 0
WC | (Czech Republic) K Kramperová | 3 | 6 | 4
(Portugal) M Larcher de Brito | 6 | 4 | 6
(Germany) L Siegemund | 6 | 6
2 | (Slovakia) J Čepelová | 3 | 3

Second round
5 | (United States) G Min | 2 | 6 | 4
Q | (Turkey) İ Soylu | 6 | 3 | 6
Q | (Netherlands) A Rus | 4 | 5
4 | (Russia) E Rodina | 6 | 7
WC | (United States) A Glatch | 6 | 6
(Turkey) Ç Büyükakçay | 4 | 1
(Portugal) M Larcher de Brito
(Germany) L Siegemund | w/o

Quarterfinals
Q | (Turkey) İ Soylu | 1 | 1
4 | (Russia) E Rodina | 6 | 6
WC | (United States) A Glatch | 6 | 5 | 6
(Germany) L Siegemund | 2 | 7 | 0

Semifinals
4 | (Russia) E Rodina | 1 | 2
WC | (United States) A Glatch | 6 | 6
