= 2012 The Oaks Club Challenger =

- Date: 26 March – 1 April
- Edition: 4th
- Surface: Clay
- Location: Osprey, Florida, United States

Champions

Singles
- (Netherlands) Arantxa Rus

Doubles
- (United States) Megan Moulton-Levy / (United States) Lindsay Lee-Waters
← 2011 ·	The Oaks Club Challenger	· 2013 →

The 2012 The Oaks Club Challenger is a professional tennis tournament played on clay courts. It is the fourth edition of the tournament which is part of the 2012 ITF Women's Circuit. It took place in Osprey, Florida, United States between 26 March and 1 April 2012. It offered the prize of US$ 50,000.

== WTA entrants ==
=== Seeds ===
Country	Player	Rank^{1}	Seed
CZE	Lucie Hradecká	68	1
BLR	Anastasiya Yakimova	79	2
RUS	Alexandra Panova	83	3
LUX	Mandy Minella	91	4
ROU	Edina Gallovits-Hall	94	5
USA	Irina Falconi	95	6
RUS	Nina Bratchikova	97	7
AUS	Anastasia Rodionova	99	8

- ^{1} Rankings are as of March 19, 2012.

=== Other entrants ===
The following players received wildcards into the singles main draw:

- (United States) Madison Brengle
- (United States) Caroline Dailey
- (United States) Melanie Oudin
- (United States) Jessica Pegula

The following players received entry from the qualifying draw:

- (Slovakia) Jana Čepelová
- (United States) Grace Min
- (Argentina) Florencia Molinero
- (United States) Coco Vandeweghe

The following players received entry by a lucky loser spot:

- (France) Kristina Mladenovic

== Champions ==
=== Singles ===
(Netherlands) Arantxa Rus def. (Kazakhstan) Sesil Karatantcheva, 6–4, 6–1

=== Doubles ===
(United States) Lindsay Lee-Waters / (United States) Megan Moulton-Levy def. (Russia) Alexandra Panova / (Ukraine) Lesia Tsurenko, 2–6, 6–4, [10–7]
