= 2015 Wilde Lexus Women's USTA Pro Circuit Event – Doubles =

Doubles
- 2015 Wilde Lexus Women's USTA Pro Circuit Event

Final
- Champions: (Ukraine) Anhelina Kalinina (Ukraine) Oleksandra Korashvili
- Runners-up: (Paraguay) Verónica Cepede Royg (Argentina) María Irigoyen
- Score: 6–1, 6–4

Events
Singles	Doubles
← 2014 ·	Wilde Lexus Women's USTA Pro Circuit Event	· 2016 →

Rika Fujiwara and Hsieh Shu-ying were the defending champions, however they both chose not to participate.

The Ukrainian-duo of Anhelina Kalinina and Oleksandra Korashvili won the title, defeating the top seeds, Verónica Cepede Royg and María Irigoyen in the final, 6–1, 6–4.

== Seeds ==
1. (Paraguay) Verónica Cepede Royg / (Argentina) María Irigoyen (final)
2. (Netherlands) Lesley Kerkhove / (Netherlands) Arantxa Rus (quarterfinals)
3. (Turkey) Çağla Büyükakçay / (Slovakia) Jana Čepelová (semifinals)
4. (China) Han Xinyun / (Czech Republic) Kateřina Kramperová (first round)

== Draw ==
=== Key ===
- Q = Qualifier
- WC = Wild card
- LL = Lucky loser
- Alt = Alternate
- SE = Special exempt
- PR = Protected ranking
- ITF = ITF entry
- JE = Junior exempt
- w/o = Walkover
- r = Retired
- d = Defaulted
- SR = Special ranking

First round
1	(Paraguay) V Cepede Royg (Argentina) M Irigoyen	7	6
(United States) M Brengle (United States) S Rogers	5	1
(United States) J Cako (United States) S Vickery	6	6
(Canada) P Januskova (United States) M Schmidt	2	4
3	(Turkey) Ç Büyükakçay (Slovakia) J Čepelová	6	7^{7}
(Croatia) T Mrdeža (Poland) K Piter	1	6^{5}
(Brazil) G Cé (Brazil) PC Gonçalves	3	0
(United Kingdom) T Moore (United Kingdom) N Slater	6	6
(Austria) P Mayr-Achleitner (Argentina) P Ormaechea	6	6
(United States) B Lashway (United States) L Proctor	2	3
(Ukraine) A Kalinina (Ukraine) O Korashvili	6^{7}	6	[10]
4	(China) X Han (Czech Republic) K Kramperová	7^{9}	3	[7]
(Czech Republic) P Krejsová (Russia) E Rodina	4	4
(Czech Republic) L Kunčíková (Czech Republic) K Stuchlá	6	6
(Paraguay) M González (Brazil) B Haddad Maia	3	1
2	(Netherlands) L Kerkhove (Netherlands) A Rus	6	6

Quarterfinals
1	(Paraguay) V Cepede Royg (Argentina) M Irigoyen	6	5	[10]
(United States) J Cako (United States) S Vickery	2	7	[7]
3	(Turkey) Ç Büyükakçay (Slovakia) J Čepelová	6	1	[10]
(United Kingdom) T Moore (United Kingdom) N Slater	1	6	[3]
(Austria) P Mayr-Achleitner (Argentina) P Ormaechea	3	3
(Ukraine) A Kalinina (Ukraine) O Korashvili	6	6
(Czech Republic) L Kunčíková (Czech Republic) K Stuchlá	6	6
2	(Netherlands) L Kerkhove (Netherlands) A Rus	3	2

Semifinals
1	(Paraguay) V Cepede Royg (Argentina) M Irigoyen	6	6
3	(Turkey) Ç Büyükakçay (Slovakia) J Čepelová	3	3
(Ukraine) A Kalinina (Ukraine) O Korashvili	7^{9}	6
(Czech Republic) L Kunčíková (Czech Republic) K Stuchlá	6^{7}	3

Final
1	(Paraguay) V Cepede Royg (Argentina) M Irigoyen	1	4
(Ukraine) A Kalinina (Ukraine) O Korashvili	6	6
