= 2015 Wilde Lexus Women's USTA Pro Circuit Event =

- Date: 30 March–5 April
- Edition: 7th
- Category: ITF Women's Circuit
- Prize money: $50,000
- Surface: Clay
- Location: Osprey, United States
- Venue: The Oaks Club

2014 Champions

Singles
- (United States) Alexa Glatch

Doubles
- (Ukraine) Anhelina Kalinina / (Ukraine) Oleksandra Korashvili
← 2014 ·	Wilde Lexus Women's USTA Pro Circuit Event	· 2016 →

The 2015 Wilde Lexus Women's USTA Pro Circuit Event was a professional tennis tournament played on outdoor clay courts. It was the seventh edition of the tournament which was part of the 2015 ITF Women's Circuit, offering a total of $50,000 in prize money. It took place in Osprey, Florida, United States, on 30 March–5 April 2015.

== Women's singles entrants ==
=== Seeds ===
Country	Player	Rank^{1}	Seed
USA	Madison Brengle	44	1
SVK	Jana Čepelová	68	2
USA	Shelby Rogers	86	3
RUS	Evgeniya Rodina	96	4
USA	Grace Min	104	5
ROU	Andreea Mitu	107	6
ESP	Lourdes Domínguez Lino	108	7
CHN	Zhu Lin	112	8

- ^{1} Rankings as of 23 March 2015

=== Other entrants ===
The following players received wildcards into the singles main draw:

- (United States) Samantha Crawford
- (United States) Alexa Glatch
- (Czech Republic) Kateřina Kramperová

The following players received entry from the qualifying draw:

- (Argentina) María Irigoyen
- (Japan) Naomi Osaka
- (Netherlands) Arantxa Rus
- (Turkey) İpek Soylu

The following player received entry by a lucky loser spot:

- (Ukraine) Anhelina Kalinina

The following player received entry by a junior exempt:

- (Russia) Darya Kasatkina

== Champions ==
=== Singles ===
- (United States) Alexa Glatch def. (United States) Madison Brengle, 6–2, 6–7^{(6–8)}, 6–3

=== Doubles ===
- (Ukraine) Anhelina Kalinina / (Ukraine) Oleksandra Korashvili def. (Paraguay) Verónica Cepede Royg / (Argentina) María Irigoyen, 6–1, 6–4
