= 2014 The Oaks Club Challenger – Doubles =

Doubles
- 2014 The Oaks Club Challenger

Final
- Champions: (Japan) Rika Fujiwara (Chinese Taipei) Hsieh Shu-ying
- Runners-up: (United States) Irina Falconi (Czech Republic) Eva Hrdinová
- Score: 6–3, 6–7^{(5–7)}, [10–4]

Events
| Singles | Doubles |
| ← 2013 · | The Oaks Club Challenger | · 2015 → |

Raquel Kops-Jones and Abigail Spears were the defending champions, but the team was unable to participate because they were still active at the Sony Open in Miami.

Rika Fujiwara and Hsieh Shu-ying won the tournament, defeating Irina Falconi and Eva Hrdinová in the final, 6–3, 6–7^{(5–7)}, [10–4].

== Seeds ==
1. (United States) Irina Falconi / (Czech Republic) Eva Hrdinová (final)
2. (Slovakia) Jana Čepelová / (Slovakia) Janette Husárová (semifinals)
3. (Czech Republic) Nikola Fraňková / (United Kingdom) Nicola Slater (semifinals)
4. (United States) Julia Cohen / (Belarus) Ilona Kremen (quarterfinals)

== Draw ==
=== Key ===
- Q = Qualifier
- WC = Wild card
- LL = Lucky loser
- Alt = Alternate
- SE = Special exempt
- PR = Protected ranking
- ITF = ITF entry
- JE = Junior exempt
- w/o = Walkover
- r = Retired
- d = Defaulted
- SR = Special ranking

First round
(United States) J Elie (Bulgaria) D Evtimova | 4 | 3
(Czech Republic) K Kramperová (United States) C Whoriskey | 6 | 6
(United States) Bri Lashway (United States) Bro Lashway | w/o
(Hong Kong) L Zhang (China) S Zheng
(Czech Republic) P Cetkovská (France) V Razzano
(Japan) R Fujiwara (Chinese Taipei) S-y Hsieh | w/o
(United States) J Abaza (United States) J Cako | 1 | 2
(Germany) D Pfizenmaier (Japan) Y Sema | 6 | 6

Quarterfinals
1 | (United States) I Falconi (Czech Republic) E Hrdinová | 7^{13} | 6
(Czech Republic) K Kramperová (United States) C Whoriskey | 6^{11} | 4
3 | (Czech Republic) N Fraňková (United Kingdom) N Slater | 6 | 6
(United States) Bri Lashway (United States) Bro Lashway | 1 | 0
(Japan) R Fujiwara (Chinese Taipei) S-y Hsieh | 7^{7} | 1 | [10]
4 | (United States) J Cohen (Belarus) I Kremen | 6^{5} | 6 | [8]
(Germany) D Pfizenmaier (Japan) Y Sema | 6^{4} | 5
2 | (Slovakia) J Čepelová (Slovakia) J Husárová | 7^{7} | 7

Semifinals
1 | (United States) I Falconi (Czech Republic) E Hrdinová | 6 | 6
3 | (Czech Republic) N Fraňková (United Kingdom) N Slater | 3 | 3
(Japan) R Fujiwara (Chinese Taipei) S-y Hsieh | 2 | 6 | [10]
2 | (Slovakia) J Čepelová (Slovakia) J Husárová | 6 | 1 | [6]

Final
1 | (United States) I Falconi (Czech Republic) E Hrdinová | 3 | 7^{7} | [4]
(Japan) R Fujiwara (Chinese Taipei) S-y Hsieh | 6 | 6^{5} | [10]
