= 2014 The Oaks Club Challenger – Singles =

Singles
- 2014 The Oaks Club Challenger

Final
- Champion: (Slovakia) Anna Karolína Schmiedlová
- Runner-up: (New Zealand) Marina Erakovic
- Score: 6–2, 6–3

Events
| Singles | Doubles |
| ← 2013 · | The Oaks Club Challenger | · 2015 → |

Mariana Duque was the defending champion, but decided not to participate.

Anna Karolína Schmiedlová won the tournament, defeating Marina Erakovic in the final, 6–2, 6–3.

== Seeds ==
1. (New Zealand) Marina Erakovic (final)
2. (Slovakia) Anna Karolína Schmiedlová (champion)
3. (Slovakia) Jana Čepelová (semifinals)
4. (Spain) Lourdes Domínguez Lino (semifinals)
5. (Germany) Dinah Pfizenmaier (first round)
6. (France) Virginie Razzano (first round)
7. (Czech Republic) Petra Cetkovská (second round; withdrew)
8. (Israel) Julia Glushko (second round)

== Main draw ==
=== Key ===
- Q = Qualifier
- WC = Wild card
- LL = Lucky loser
- Alt = Alternate
- SE = Special exempt
- PR = Protected ranking
- ITF = ITF entry
- JE = Junior exempt
- w/o = Walkover
- r = Retired
- d = Defaulted
- SR = Special ranking

=== Finals ===
Semifinals
1 | (New Zealand) Marina Erakovic | 1 | 6 | 6
3 | (Slovakia) Jana Čepelová | 6 | 4 | 3
4 | (Spain) Lourdes Domínguez Lino | 4 | 6 | 6^{5}
2 | (Slovakia) Anna Karolína Schmiedlová | 6 | 3 | 7^{7}

Final
1 | (New Zealand) Marina Erakovic | 2 | 3
2 | (Slovakia) Anna Karolína Schmiedlová | 6 | 6

=== Top half ===
First round
1 | (New Zealand) M Erakovic | 7 | 6
PR | (Russia) E Rodina | 5 | 0
(Australia) O Rogowska | 6 | 6
(Brazil) T Pereira | 4 | 0
WC | (United States) M Brengle | 1 | 5
(Netherlands) K Bertens | 6 | 7
(United States) M Oudin | 3 | 6 | 6^{5}
7 | (Czech Republic) P Cetkovská | 6 | 3 | 7^{7}
3 | (Slovakia) J Čepelová | 0 | 6 | 7
Q | (Australia) A Barty | 6 | 4 | 5
WC | (United States) J Elie | 7^{7} | 0 | 6^{5}
(Spain) E Cabeza Candela | 6^{5} | 6 | 7^{7}
(Belarus) A Sasnovich | 3 | 4
(Portugal) M Larcher de Brito | 6 | 6
LL | (Belarus) I Kremen | 7 | 7^{8}
5 | (Germany) D Pfizenmaier | 5 | 6^{6}

Second round
1 | (New Zealand) M Erakovic | 6 | 6
(Australia) O Rogowska | 3 | 2
(Netherlands) K Bertens | w/o
7 | (Czech Republic) P Cetkovská
3 | (Slovakia) J Čepelová | 6 | 6
(Spain) E Cabeza Candela | 2 | 2
(Portugal) M Larcher de Brito | 4 | 4
LL | (Belarus) I Kremen | 6 | 6

Quarterfinals
1 | (New Zealand) M Erakovic | 6 | 6
(Netherlands) K Bertens | 1 | 2
3 | (Slovakia) J Čepelová | 6 | 6
LL | (Belarus) I Kremen | 1 | 3

Semifinals
1 | (New Zealand) M Erakovic | 1 | 6 | 6
3 | (Slovakia) J Čepelová | 6 | 4 | 3

=== Bottom half ===
First round
8 | (Israel) J Glushko | 6 | 6
(Croatia) P Martić | 4 | 4
(Switzerland) R Oprandi | 6 | 6
(United States) I Falconi | 4 | 0
WC | (United States) J Cohen | 3 | 2
(Ukraine) L Tsurenko | 6 | 6
Q | (Kazakhstan) Y Putintseva | 2 | 3
4 | (Spain) L Domínguez Lino | 6 | 6
6 | (France) V Razzano | 2 | 3
(Sweden) J Larsson | 6 | 6
Q | (Czech Republic) L Hradecká | 4
(Ukraine) N Kichenok | 4^{r}
Q | (Ukraine) O Savchuk | 2 | 6^{5}
(France) M Johansson | 6 | 7^{7}
WC | (United States) J Abaza | 2 | 0
2 | (Slovakia) AK Schmiedlová | 6 | 6

Second round
8 | (Israel) J Glushko | 2 | 6 | 1
(Switzerland) R Oprandi | 6 | 4 | 6
(Ukraine) L Tsurenko | 3 | 4
4 | (Spain) L Domínguez Lino | 6 | 6
(Sweden) J Larsson | w/o
Q | (Czech Republic) L Hradecká
(France) M Johansson | 6 | 3 | 4
2 | (Slovakia) AK Schmiedlová | 0 | 6 | 6

Quarterfinals
(Switzerland) R Oprandi | 4 | 6 | 1
4 | (Spain) L Domínguez Lino | 6 | 4 | 6
(Sweden) J Larsson | 4 | 1
2 | (Slovakia) AK Schmiedlová | 6 | 6

Semifinals
4 | (Spain) L Domínguez Lino | 4 | 6 | 6^{5}
2 | (Slovakia) AK Schmiedlová | 6 | 3 | 7^{7}
