= 2013 The Oaks Club Challenger – Singles =

Women's tennis competition

Singles
- 2013 The Oaks Club Challenger

Final
- Champion: (Colombia) Mariana Duque Mariño
- Runner-up: (Spain) Estrella Cabeza Candela
- Score: 7–6^{(7–2)}, 6–1

Events
Singles	Doubles
← 2012 ·	The Oaks Club Challenger	· 2014 →

Arantxa Rus was the defending champion, but lost in the first round to Mariana Duque Mariño.

Duque Mariño then went on to win the title, defeating Estrella Cabeza Candela in the final, 7–6^{(7–2)}, 6–1.

== Seeds ==
1. (Czech Republic) Lucie Hradecká (first round, retired)
2. (Czech Republic) Andrea Hlaváčková (second round)
3. (Ukraine) Lesia Tsurenko (second round)
4. (Netherlands) Arantxa Rus (first round)
5. (Russia) Olga Puchkova (second round)
6. (France) Pauline Parmentier (second round)
7. (France) Mathilde Johansson (first round)
8. (United States) Melanie Oudin (first round)

== Main draw ==
=== Key ===
- Q = Qualifier
- WC = Wild card
- LL = Lucky loser
- Alt = Alternate
- SE = Special exempt
- PR = Protected ranking
- ITF = ITF entry
- JE = Junior exempt
- w/o = Walkover
- r = Retired
- d = Defaulted
- SR = Special ranking

=== Finals ===
Semifinals
(Slovakia) Jana Čepelová	1	6^{3}
(Spain) Estrella Cabeza Candela	6	7^{7}
Q	(Colombia) Mariana Duque Mariño	6	6
JE	(Czech Republic) Kateřina Siniaková	3	1

Final
(Spain) Estrella Cabeza Candela	6^{2}	1
Q	(Colombia) Mariana Duque Mariño	7^{7}	6

=== Top half ===
First round
1	(Czech Republic) L Hradecká	2	0^{r}
Q	(Colombia) C Castaño	6	1
(Slovakia) J Čepelová	6	4	6
Q	(United States) J Brady	2	6	2
LL	(United States) M Brengle	6	3	5
(Canada) S Fichman	4	6	7
(Kazakhstan) S Karatantcheva	6^{7}	2
5	(Russia) O Puchkova	7^{9}	6
3	(Ukraine) L Tsurenko	6	6
(Brazil) T Pereira	3	2
(Czech Republic) Kr Plíšková	6	6^{8}	7
WC	(Ukraine) O Ianchuk	3	7^{10}	5
Q	(United States) J Craybas	7	7
(United States) A Glatch	5	5
(Spain) E Cabeza Candela	6	6
8	(United States) M Oudin	0	4

Second round
Q	(Colombia) C Castaño	6^{5}	1
(Slovakia) J Čepelová	7^{7}	6
(Canada) S Fichman	6	3	6
5	(Russia) O Puchkova	3	6	4
3	(Ukraine) L Tsurenko	4	7^{7}	4
(Czech Republic) Kr Plíšková	6	6^{4}	6
Q	(United States) J Craybas	6^{6}	0
(Spain) E Cabeza Candela	7^{8}	6

Quarterfinals
(Slovakia) J Čepelová	6	6
(Canada) S Fichman	3	3
(Czech Republic) Kr Plíšková	1	0
(Spain) E Cabeza Candela	6	6

Semifinals
(Slovakia) J Čepelová	1	6^{3}
(Spain) E Cabeza Candela	6	7^{7}

=== Bottom half ===
First round
6	(France) P Parmentier	6	6
(Kazakhstan) Y Putintseva	2	1
(United States) J Cohen	6^{4}	6	7^{8}
(Czech Republic) Ka Plíšková	7^{7}	3	6^{6}
(Russia) N Bratchikova	4	6	1
WC	(United States) Cha Scholl	6	2	6
Q	(Colombia) M Duque Mariño	6	6
4	(Netherlands) A Rus	1	0
7	(France) M Johansson	4	6^{4}
WC	(United States) I Falconi	6	7^{7}
(Romania) A Cadanțu	4	6	1
JE	(Czech Republic) K Siniaková	6	3	6
(Croatia) M Lučić-Baroni	2	1
(Russia) M Sirotkina	6	6
WC	(United States) Chi Scholl	2	0
2	(Czech Republic) A Hlaváčková	6	6

Second round
6	(France) P Parmentier	1	2
(United States) J Cohen	6	6
WC	(United States) Cha Scholl	1	2
Q	(Colombia) M Duque Mariño	6	6
WC	(United States) I Falconi	2	1
JE	(Czech Republic) K Siniaková	6	6
(Russia) M Sirotkina	3	6	6
2	(Czech Republic) A Hlaváčková	6	1	3

Quarterfinals
(United States) J Cohen	0	4
Q	(Colombia) M Duque Mariño	6	6
JE	(Czech Republic) K Siniaková	6	6
(Russia) M Sirotkina	3	0

Semifinals
Q	(Colombia) M Duque Mariño	6	6
JE	(Czech Republic) K Siniaková	3	1
