= 2013 The Oaks Club Challenger – Doubles =

Doubles
- 2013 The Oaks Club Challenger

Final
- Champions: (United States) Raquel Kops-Jones (United States) Abigail Spears
- Runners-up: (Paraguay) Verónica Cepede Royg (Spain) Inés Ferrer Suárez
- Score: 6–1, 6–3

Events
Singles	Doubles
← 2012 ·	The Oaks Club Challenger	· 2014 →

Lindsay Lee-Waters and Megan Moulton-Levy were the defending champions, having won the event in 2012, but both players chose not to participate.

Raquel Kops-Jones and Abigail Spears won the title, defeating Verónica Cepede Royg and Inés Ferrer Suárez in the final, 6–1, 6–3.

== Seeds ==
1. (Czech Republic) Andrea Hlaváčková / (Czech Republic) Lucie Hradecká (quarterfinals, withdrew)
2. (United States) Raquel Kops-Jones / (United States) Abigail Spears (champions)
3. (South Africa) Natalie Grandin / (Czech Republic) Vladimíra Uhlířová (semifinals)
4. (Russia) Nina Bratchikova / (Romania) Alexandra Cadanțu (quarterfinals)

== Draw ==
=== Key ===
- Q = Qualifier
- WC = Wild card
- LL = Lucky loser
- Alt = Alternate
- SE = Special exempt
- PR = Protected ranking
- ITF = ITF entry
- JE = Junior exempt
- w/o = Walkover
- r = Retired
- d = Defaulted
- SR = Special ranking

First round
1	(Czech Republic) A Hlaváčková (Czech Republic) L Hradecká	6	6
(United States) J Cohen (Belarus) I Kremen	2	2
(United States) N Pluskota (United States) Chi Scholl	4	4
(Paraguay) V Cepede Royg (Spain) I Ferrer Suárez	6	6
3	(South Africa) N Grandin (Czech Republic) V Uhlířová	6	6
(Canada) S Fichman (Russia) A Gabueva	0	1
(Spain) A Parra Santonja (France) I Pavlovic	6	6
(Czech Republic) Kr Plíšková (Germany) K Wörle	2	4
(Brazil) PC Gonçalves (Argentina) F Molinero	6	6
(Russia) O Puchkova (Russia) M Sirotkina	3	3
WC	(United States) J Brady (United States) Cha Scholl	3	6^{8}
4	(Russia) N Bratchikova (Romania) A Cadanțu	6	7^{10}
WC	(United States) M Brengle (United States) A Glatch	2	6	[10]
(Switzerland) C Perrin (Slovenia) M Zec Peškirič	6	1	[2]
WC	(United States) Bri Lashway (United States) Bro Lashway	3	1
2	(United States) R Kops-Jones (United States) A Spears	6	6

Quarterfinals
1	(Czech Republic) A Hlaváčková (Czech Republic) L Hradecká
(Paraguay) V Cepede Royg (Spain) I Ferrer Suárez	w/o
3	(South Africa) N Grandin (Czech Republic) V Uhlířová	4	6	[10]
(Spain) A Parra Santonja (France) I Pavlovic	6	0	[6]
(Brazil) PC Gonçalves (Argentina) F Molinero	6	6
4	(Russia) N Bratchikova (Romania) A Cadanțu	2	1
WC	(United States) M Brengle (United States) A Glatch	6	6^{5}	[5]
2	(United States) R Kops-Jones (United States) A Spears	4	7^{7}	[10]

Semifinals
(Paraguay) V Cepede Royg (Spain) I Ferrer Suárez	7^{8}	7^{7}
3	(South Africa) N Grandin (Czech Republic) V Uhlířová	6^{6}	6^{4}
(Brazil) PC Gonçalves (Argentina) F Molinero	3	6^{5}
2	(United States) R Kops-Jones (United States) A Spears	6	7^{7}

Final
(Paraguay) V Cepede Royg (Spain) I Ferrer Suárez	1	3
2	(United States) R Kops-Jones (United States) A Spears	6	6
