= 2016 Wilde Lexus Women's USTA Pro Circuit Event =

- Date: 28 March–3 April
- Edition: 8th
- Category: ITF Women's Circuit
- Prize money: $50,000
- Surface: Clay
- Location: Osprey, Florida, United States

Champions

Singles
- (United States) Madison Brengle

Doubles
- (United States) Asia Muhammad / (United States) Taylor Townsend
← 2015 ·	Wilde Lexus Women's USTA Pro Circuit Event	· 2017 →

The 2016 Wilde Lexus Women's USTA Pro Circuit Event was a professional tennis tournament played on outdoor clay courts. It was the eighth edition of the tournament and part of the 2016 ITF Women's Circuit, offering a total of $50,000 in prize money. It took place in Osprey, Florida, United States, on 28 March–3 April 2016.

== Singles main draw entrants ==
=== Seeds ===
Country	Player	Rank^{1}	Seed
USA	Madison Brengle	60	1
JPN	Kurumi Nara	78	2
LAT	Anastasija Sevastova	88	3
ESP	Lara Arruabarrena	89	4
GER	Tatjana Maria	92	5
ITA	Francesca Schiavone	105	6
RUS	Evgeniya Rodina	107	7
USA	Samantha Crawford	109	8

- ^{1} Rankings as of 21 March 2016.

=== Other entrants ===
The following players received wildcards into the singles main draw:

- (United States) Jennifer Brady
- (United States) Sophia Edwards
- (United States) Jamie Loeb

The following players received entry from the qualifying draw:

- (Netherlands) Arantxa Rus
- (Switzerland) Amra Sadiković
- (Germany) Anne Schäfer
- (Turkey) İpek Soylu

The following player received an entry by a lucky loser spot:

- (United States) Sophie Chang

== Champions ==
=== Singles ===
- (United States) Madison Brengle def. (Spain) Lara Arruabarrena, 4–6, 6–4, 6–3

=== Doubles ===
- (United States) Asia Muhammad / (United States) Taylor Townsend def. (United States) Louisa Chirico / (United States) Katerina Stewart, 6–1, 6–7^{(5–7)}, [10–4]
