= 2016 Wilde Lexus Women's USTA Pro Circuit Event – Singles =

Singles
- 2016 Wilde Lexus Women's USTA Pro Circuit Event

Final
- Champion: (United States) Madison Brengle
- Runner-up: (Spain) Lara Arruabarrena
- Score: 4–6, 6–4, 6–3

Events
Singles	Doubles
← 2015 ·	Wilde Lexus Women's USTA Pro Circuit Event	· 2017 →

Alexa Glatch was the defending champion, but chose not to participate.

Madison Brengle won the title, defeating Lara Arruabarrena in the final, 4–6, 6–4, 6–3.

== Seeds ==
1. (United States) Madison Brengle (champion)
2. (Japan) Kurumi Nara (second round, retired)
3. (Latvia) Anastasija Sevastova (quarterfinals)
4. (Spain) Lara Arruabarrena (final)
5. (Germany) Tatjana Maria (quarterfinals)
6. (Italy) Francesca Schiavone (second round)
7. (Russia) Evgeniya Rodina (first round)
8. (United States) Samantha Crawford (quarterfinals)

== Main draw ==
=== Key ===
- Q = Qualifier
- WC = Wild card
- LL = Lucky loser
- Alt = Alternate
- SE = Special exempt
- PR = Protected ranking
- ITF = ITF entry
- JE = Junior exempt
- w/o = Walkover
- r = Retired
- d = Defaulted
- SR = Special ranking

=== Finals ===
Semifinals
1	(United States) Madison Brengle	1	6	6
(Sweden) Rebecca Peterson	6	1	3
4	(Spain) Lara Arruabarrena	6	6
(Greece) Maria Sakkari	3	1

Final
1	(United States) Madison Brengle	4	6	6
4	(Spain) Lara Arruabarrena	6	4	3

=== Top half ===
First round
1	(United States) M Brengle	7	7
(Spain) L Domínguez Lino	5	5
Q	(Switzerland) A Sadiković	6	7
(Belgium) A-S Mestach	4	5
Q	(Netherlands) A Rus	6	1	7
WC	(United States) J Brady	4	6	5
Q	(Turkey) İ Soylu	7	1	2
8	(United States) S Crawford	5	6	6
3	(Latvia) A Sevastova	6	6
WC	(United States) S Edwards	0	1
(United States) L Chirico	2	4
(Paraguay) V Cepede Royg	6	6
(Belgium) Y Bonaventure	5	6^{4}
(Romania) PM Țig	7	7^{7}
(Sweden) R Peterson	6	6
7	(Russia) E Rodina	1	2

Second round
1	(United States) M Brengle	6^{4}	7	6
Q	(Switzerland) A Sadiković	7^{7}	5	0
Q	(Netherlands) A Rus	4	3
8	(United States) S Crawford	6	6
3	(Latvia) A Sevastova	6	6
(Paraguay) V Cepede Royg	2	2
(Romania) PM Țig	6^{6}	3
(Sweden) R Peterson	7^{8}	6

Quarterfinals
1	(United States) M Brengle	6	6
8	(United States) S Crawford	1	0
3	(Latvia) A Sevastova	2	1
(Sweden) R Peterson	6	6

Semifinals
1	(United States) M Brengle	1	6	6
(Sweden) R Peterson	6	1	3

=== Bottom half ===
First round
5	(Germany) T Maria	6^{4}	6	6
(United States) J Pegula	7^{7}	4	3
(China) X Han	2	6	3
(Ukraine) M Zanevska	6	4	6
(France) A Lim	6	4	7^{7}
WC	(United States) J Loeb	1	6	6^{5}
LL	(United States) S Chang	3	2
4	(Spain) L Arruabarrena	6	6
6	(Italy) F Schiavone	6	2	6
(Serbia) A Krunić	1	6	1
(Greece) M Sakkari	1	6	6
(United States) K Stewart	6	4	0
Q	(Germany) A Schäfer	6	1	7^{7}
(Slovakia) K Kučová	3	6	6^{3}
(Turkey) Ç Büyükakçay	1	7^{7}	2
2	(Japan) K Nara	6	6^{2}	6

Second round
5	(Germany) T Maria	6	3	6
(Ukraine) M Zanevska	3	6	4
(France) A Lim	6	6^{2}	4
4	(Spain) L Arruabarrena	2	7^{7}	6
6	(Italy) F Schiavone	3	4
(Greece) M Sakkari	6	6
Q	(Germany) A Schäfer	2
2	(Japan) K Nara	1^{r}

Quarterfinals
5	(Germany) T Maria	3	3
4	(Spain) L Arruabarrena	6	6
(Greece) M Sakkari	2	6	6
Q	(Germany) A Schäfer	6	1	4

Semifinals
4	(Spain) L Arruabarrena	6	6
(Greece) M Sakkari	3	1
