= 2012 The Oaks Club Challenger – Doubles =

Doubles
- 2012 The Oaks Club Challenger

Final
- Champions: (United States) Lindsay Lee-Waters (United States) Megan Moulton-Levy
- Runners-up: (Russia) Alexandra Panova (Ukraine) Lesia Tsurenko
- Score: 2–6, 6–4, [10–7]

Events
| Singles | Doubles |
| ← 2011 · | The Oaks Club Challenger | · 2013 → |

Stéphanie Foretz Gacon and Alexa Glatch were the defending champions, but both players chose not to participate.

Lindsay Lee-Waters and Megan Moulton-Levy won the title, defeating Alexandra Panova and Lesia Tsurenko in the final, 2–6, 6–4, [10–7].

== Seeds ==
1. (South Africa) Natalie Grandin / (Czech Republic) Vladimíra Uhlířová (first round)
2. (Russia) Nina Bratchikova / (Croatia) Darija Jurak (semifinals)
3. (Latvia) Līga Dekmeijere / (Russia) Valeria Savinykh (first round)
4. (Czech Republic) Karolína Plíšková / (Czech Republic) Kristýna Plíšková (first round)

== Draw ==
=== Key ===
- Q = Qualifier
- WC = Wild card
- LL = Lucky loser
- Alt = Alternate
- SE = Special exempt
- PR = Protected ranking
- ITF = ITF entry
- JE = Junior exempt
- w/o = Walkover
- r = Retired
- d = Defaulted
- SR = Special ranking

=== Draw ===
First round
1 | (South Africa) N Grandin (Czech Republic) V Uhlířová | 2 | 5
(United States) L Lee-Waters (United States) M Moulton-Levy | 6 | 7
WC | (United States) I Falconi (United States) C Vandeweghe | 7 | 2 | [10]
(Brazil) MF Alves (United States) A Mueller | 5 | 6 | [5]
3 | (Latvia) L Dekmeijere (Russia) V Savinykh | 1 | 1
(Argentina) M Auroux (Argentina) M Irigoyen | 6 | 6
(Russia) M Kondratieva (France) S Lefevre | 2 | 4
(Canada) S Fichman (Canada) M-È Pelletier | 6 | 6
(United States) J Cohen (Argentina) F Molinero | 6 | 6
WC | (United States) L Burich (United States) TZ Dewar | 1 | 0
(Russia) A Panova (Ukraine) L Tsurenko | 6 | 7
4 | (Czech Republic) Ka Plíšková (Czech Republic) Kr Plíšková | 2 | 5
WC | (United States) C Gullickson (United States) A Weinhold | 6 | 5 | [7]
(Colombia) C Castaño (Colombia) M Duque-Mariño | 2 | 7 | [10]
(United States) Y Schnack (United States) C Scholl | 2 | 5
2 | (Russia) N Bratchikova (Croatia) D Jurak | 6 | 7

Quarterfinals
(United States) L Lee-Waters (United States) M Moulton-Levy | 6 | 7^{7}
WC | (United States) I Falconi (United States) C Vandeweghe | 4 | 6^{2}
(Argentina) M Auroux (Argentina) M Irigoyen | 5 | 5
(Canada) S Fichman (Canada) M-È Pelletier | 7 | 7
(United States) J Cohen (Argentina) F Molinero | 2 | 0
(Russia) A Panova (Ukraine) L Tsurenko | 6 | 6
(Colombia) C Castaño (Colombia) M Duque-Mariño | 2 | 1
2 | (Russia) N Bratchikova (Croatia) D Jurak | 6 | 6

Semifinals
(United States) L Lee-Waters (United States) M Moulton-Levy | 6 | 1 | [10]
(Canada) S Fichman (Canada) M-È Pelletier | 1 | 6 | [7]
(Russia) A Panova (Ukraine) L Tsurenko | 6 | 6
2 | (Russia) N Bratchikova (Croatia) D Jurak | 3 | 4

Finals
(United States) L Lee-Waters (United States) M Moulton-Levy | 2 | 6 | [10]
(Russia) A Panova (Ukraine) L Tsurenko | 6 | 4 | [7]
