= 2016 Wilde Lexus Women's USTA Pro Circuit Event – Doubles =

Doubles
- 2016 Wilde Lexus Women's USTA Pro Circuit Event

Final
- Champions: (United States) Asia Muhammad (United States) Taylor Townsend
- Runners-up: (United States) Louisa Chirico (United States) Katerina Stewart
- Score: 6–1, 6–7^{(5–7)}, [10–4]

Events
Singles	Doubles
← 2015 ·	Wilde Lexus Women's USTA Pro Circuit Event	· 2017 →

Anhelina Kalinina and Oleksandra Korashvili were the defending champions, but both players chose not to participate.

Asia Muhammad and Taylor Townsend won the title, defeating Louisa Chirico and Katerina Stewart in an all-American final, 6–1, 6–7^{(5–7)}, [10–4].

== Seeds ==
1. (Belgium) An-Sophie Mestach / (Ukraine) Maryna Zanevska (quarterfinals)
2. (United States) Asia Muhammad / (United States) Taylor Townsend (champions)
3. (Brazil) Paula Cristina Gonçalves / (United States) Sanaz Marand (semifinals)
4. (Russia) Evgeniya Rodina / (Latvia) Anastasija Sevastova (quarterfinals)

== Draw ==
=== Key ===
- Q = Qualifier
- WC = Wild card
- LL = Lucky loser
- Alt = Alternate
- SE = Special exempt
- PR = Protected ranking
- ITF = ITF entry
- JE = Junior exempt
- w/o = Walkover
- r = Retired
- d = Defaulted
- SR = Special ranking

First round
(United States) J Loeb (United States) I Neel	6	6
(Norway) U Eikeri (Czech Republic) T Martincová	4	4
4	(Russia) E Rodina (Latvia) A Sevastova	6	6
(United States) S Chang (Netherlands) Q Lemoine	0	1
(United States) L Chirico (United States) K Stewart	w/o
(Hungary) R-L Jani (Czech Republic) K Kramperová
(Belgium) M Benoît (Italy) G Gatto-Monticone	w/o
(Netherlands) A Rus (Turkey) İ Soylu
(Italy) A Grymalska (Germany) A Schäfer	4	3
3	(Brazil) PC Gonçalves (United States) S Marand	6	6
(Serbia) J Jakšić (United States) M Schmidt	7	2	[8]
(United States) M Brengle (United States) S Crawford	5	6	[10]

Quarterfinals
1	(Belgium) A-S Mestach (Ukraine) M Zanevska	5	2
(United States) J Loeb (United States) I Neel	7	6
4	(Russia) E Rodina (Latvia) A Sevastova	6	3	[4]
(United States) L Chirico (United States) K Stewart	2	6	[10]
(Belgium) M Benoît (Italy) G Gatto-Monticone	0	3
3	(Brazil) PC Gonçalves (United States) S Marand	6	6
(United States) M Brengle (United States) S Crawford	2	1
2	(United States) A Muhammad (United States) T Townsend	6	6

Semifinals
(United States) J Loeb (United States) I Neel	4	5
(United States) L Chirico (United States) K Stewart	6	7
3	(Brazil) PC Gonçalves (United States) S Marand	1	1
2	(United States) A Muhammad (United States) T Townsend	6	6

Final
(United States) L Chirico (United States) K Stewart	1	7^{7}	[4]
2	(United States) A Muhammad (United States) T Townsend	6	6^{5}	[10]
