= 2015 Advantage Cars Prague Open =

Tennis tournament in the Czech Republic

- Date: 10–16 August
- Edition: 22nd (ATP); 11th (ITF Women)
- Category: ATP Challenger Tour; ITF Women's Circuit
- Prize money: €42,500 (ATP) $75,000 (ITF)
- Surface: Clay
- Location: Prague, Czech Republic
- Venue: I. Czech Lawn Tennis Club

Champions

Men's singles
- (Brazil) Rogério Dutra Silva

Women's singles
- (Spain) María Teresa Torró Flor

Men's doubles
- (Netherlands) Wesley Koolhof / (Netherlands) Matwé Middelkoop

Women's doubles
- (Czech Republic) Kateřina Kramperová / (United States) Bernarda Pera
- Advantage Cars Prague Open

The 2015 Advantage Cars Prague Open, also known as Advantage Cars Prague Open by Zenova Services for sponsorship reasons, was a professional tennis tournament played on outdoor clay courts. It was the 22nd (ATP) and 11th (ITF) editions of the tournament and part of the 2015 ATP Challenger Tour and the 2015 ITF Women's Circuit, offering totals of €42,500 (ATP) and $75,000 (ITF) in prize money. It took place in Prague, Czech Republic, on 10–16 August 2015.

== Men's singles main draw entrants ==
=== Seeds ===
Country	Player	Rank^{1}	Seed
ESP	Albert Ramos-Viñolas	54	1
AUT	Andreas Haider-Maurer	58	2
ITA	Simone Bolelli	60	3
BEL	Steve Darcis	65	4
KAZ	Aleksandr Nedovyesov	92	5
MDA	Radu Albot	99	6
ESP	Daniel Muñoz de la Nava	108	7
GER	Jan-Lennard Struff	119	8

- ^{1} Rankings as of 3 August 2015

=== Other entrants ===
The following players received wildcards into the singles main draw:

- (Czech Republic) Jan Šátral
- (Slovakia) Adrian Sikora
- (Czech Republic) Robin Staněk
- (Slovakia) Dominik Šproch

The following players received entry from the qualifying draw:

- (Brazil) Rogério Dutra Silva
- (Croatia) Nikola Mektić
- (France) Axel Michon
- (Spain) Pere Riba

== Women's singles main draw entrants ==
=== Seeds ===
Country	Player	Rank^{1}	Seed
CZE	Denisa Allertová	79	1
ESP	Lourdes Domínguez Lino	92	2
CZE	Klára Koukalová	103	3
NED	Richèl Hogenkamp	117	4
UKR	Maryna Zanevska	127	5
RUS	Alexandra Panova	133	6
ESP	María Teresa Torró Flor	142	7
LAT	Anastasija Sevastova	143	8

- ^{1} Rankings as of 3 August 2015

=== Other entrants ===
The following players received wildcards into the singles main draw:

- (Czech Republic) Petra Cetkovská
- (Czech Republic) Karolína Muchová
- (Czech Republic) Nicole Vaidišová
- (Czech Republic) Markéta Vondroušová

The following players received entry from the qualifying draw:

- (Czech Republic) Martina Borecká
- (Spain) Georgina García Pérez
- (Russia) Anastasiya Komardina
- (Netherlands) Arantxa Rus

The following player received entry by a protected ranking:

- (Russia) Victoria Kan

== Champions ==
=== Men's singles ===
- (Brazil) Rogério Dutra Silva def. (Moldova) Radu Albot, 6–2, 6–7^{(5–7)}, 6–4

=== Women's singles ===
- (Spain) María Teresa Torró Flor def. (Czech Republic) Denisa Allertová, 6–3, 7–6^{(7–5)}

=== Men's doubles ===
- (Netherlands) Wesley Koolhof / (Netherlands) Matwé Middelkoop def. (Belarus) Sergey Betov / (Russia) Mikhail Elgin, 6–4, 3–6, [10–7]

=== Women's doubles ===
- (Czech Republic) Kateřina Kramperová / (United States) Bernarda Pera def. (Czech Republic) Miriam Kolodziejová / (Czech Republic) Markéta Vondroušová, 7–6^{(7–4)}, 5–7, [10–1]
