= 2015 Advantage Cars Prague Open – Men's singles =

Men's singles
- 2015 Advantage Cars Prague Open

Final
- Champion: (Brazil) Rogério Dutra Silva
- Runner-up: (Moldova) Radu Albot
- Score: 6–2, 6–7^{(5–7)}, 6–4

Events
Singles	men	women
Doubles	men	women
- Advantage Cars Prague Open

The men's singles of the 2015 Advantage Cars Prague Open tournament was played on clay in Prague, Czech Republic.

Diego Schwartzman was the defending champion, but chose not to participate.

Rogério Dutra Silva won the tournament, defeating Radu Albot in the final, 6–2, 6–7^{(5–7)}, 6–4.

== Seeds ==
1. (Spain) Albert Ramos-Viñolas (second round)
2. (Austria) Andreas Haider-Maurer (second round)
3. (Italy) Simone Bolelli (quarterfinals)
4. (Belgium) Steve Darcis (quarterfinals)
5. (Kazakhstan) Aleksandr Nedovyesov (first round)
6. (Moldova) Radu Albot (final)
7. (Spain) Daniel Muñoz de la Nava (second round)
8. (Germany) Jan-Lennard Struff (first round)

== Draw ==
Key

- Q = Qualifier
- WC = Wild card
- LL = Lucky loser
- Alt = Alternate
- ITF = ITF entry
- PR = Protected ranking
- SR = Special ranking
- SE = Special exempt
- JE = Junior exempt
- JR = Junior Accelerator Programme entrant
- CO = College Accelerator Programme entrant
- NG = Next Gen Accelerator Program entrant
- w/o = Walkover
- r = Retired
- d = Defaulted

=== Finals ===
Semifinals
Q	(Brazil) Rogério Dutra Silva	7^{7}	6
(Czech Republic) Adam Pavlásek	6^{4}	4
Q	(France) Axel Michon	5	5
6	(Moldova) Radu Albot	7	7

Final
Q	(Brazil) Rogério Dutra Silva	6	6^{5}	6
6	(Moldova) Radu Albot	2	7^{7}	4

=== Top half ===
First round
1	(Spain) A Ramos-Viñolas	6	6
(Spain) J Samper-Montaña	1	3
(Serbia) F Krajinović	6	6
(Czech Republic) J Mertl	3	3
(Kazakhstan) A Golubev	3	3
(Hungary) M Fucsovics	6	6
Q	(Brazil) R Dutra Silva	6	7^{7}
5	(Kazakhstan) A Nedovyesov	3	6^{0}
4	(Belgium) S Darcis	7^{7}	6
(Argentina) P Cachin	6^{2}	4
WC	(Czech Republic) Robin Staněk	6	3	4
WC	(Czech Republic) J Šátral	2	6	6
(Chile) H Podlipnik Castillo	6	6
WC	(Slovakia) Dominik Šproch	1	0
(Czech Republic) A Pavlásek	6	6
8	(Germany) J-L Struff	0	1

Second round
1	(Spain) A Ramos-Viñolas	4	5
(Serbia) F Krajinović	6	7
(Hungary) M Fucsovics	0^{r}
Q	(Brazil) R Dutra Silva	3
4	(Belgium) S Darcis	6	6
WC	(Czech Republic) J Šátral	3	3
(Chile) H Podlipnik Castillo	6^{7}	2
(Czech Republic) A Pavlásek	7^{9}	6

Quarterfinals
(Serbia) F Krajinović	4	3
Q	(Brazil) R Dutra Silva	6	6
4	(Belgium) S Darcis	2	7^{7}	4
(Czech Republic) A Pavlásek	6	6^{0}	6

Semifinals
Q	(Brazil) R Dutra Silva	7^{7}	6
(Czech Republic) A Pavlásek	6^{4}	4

=== Bottom half ===
First round
7	(Spain) D Muñoz de la Nava	6	6
(Dominican Republic) J Hernández	3	2
(Slovakia) A Martin	4	6	2
Q	(France) A Michon	6	3	6
(Belarus) U Ignatik	4	7^{11}	0
(Spain) R Carballés Baena	6	6^{9}	6
WC	(Slovakia) Adrian Sikora	0	2
3	(Italy) S Bolelli	6	6
6	(Moldova) R Albot	5	6	7^{7}
(Romania) A Ungur	7	2	6^{5}
(Spain) R Ramírez Hidalgo	6	2	1
Q	(Spain) P Riba	2	6	6
Q	(Croatia) N Mektić	3	6	6
(Argentina) F Argüello	6	0	1
(Germany) T Kamke	1	4
2	(Austria) A Haider-Maurer	6	6

Second round
7	(Spain) D Muñoz de la Nava	3	2
Q	(France) A Michon	6	6
(Spain) R Carballés Baena	3	6^{1}
3	(Italy) S Bolelli	6	7^{7}
6	(Moldova) R Albot	6	6
Q	(Spain) P Riba	4	4
Q	(Croatia) N Mektić	6	7^{8}
2	(Austria) A Haider-Maurer	4	6^{6}

Quarterfinals
Q	(France) A Michon	6	4	7^{7}
3	(Italy) S Bolelli	2	6	6^{4}
6	(Moldova) R Albot	6	7^{7}
Q	(Croatia) N Mektić	3	6^{4}

Semifinals
Q	(France) A Michon	5	5
6	(Moldova) R Albot	7	7
