= 2015 Advantage Cars Prague Open – Women's singles =

Women's singles
- 2015 Advantage Cars Prague Open

Final
- Champion: (Spain) María Teresa Torró Flor
- Runner-up: (Czech Republic) Denisa Allertová
- Score: 6–3, 7–6^{(7–5)}

Events
Singles	men	women
Doubles	men	women
- Advantage Cars Prague Open

The women's singles of the 2015 Advantage Cars Prague Open tournament was played on clay in Prague, Czech Republic.

This was the 11th edition of the tournament.

María Teresa Torró Flor won the title, defeating Denisa Allertová in the final, 6–3, 7–6^{(7–5)}.

== Seeds ==
1. (Czech Republic) Denisa Allertová (final)
2. (Spain) Lourdes Domínguez Lino (second round)
3. (Czech Republic) Klára Koukalová (first round)
4. (Netherlands) Richèl Hogenkamp (first round; retired)
5. (Ukraine) Maryna Zanevska (semifinals)
6. (Russia) Alexandra Panova (second round; retired)
7. (Spain) María Teresa Torró Flor (champion)
8. (Latvia) Anastasija Sevastova (first round; retired)

== Main draw ==
Key

- Q = Qualifier
- WC = Wild card
- LL = Lucky loser
- Alt = Alternate
- ITF = ITF entry
- PR = Protected ranking
- SR = Special ranking
- SE = Special exempt
- JE = Junior exempt
- JR = Junior Accelerator Programme entrant
- CO = College Accelerator Programme entrant
- NG = Next Gen Accelerator Program entrant
- w/o = Walkover
- r = Retired
- d = Defaulted

=== Finals ===
Semifinals
1	(Czech Republic) Denisa Allertová	0	6	7^{7}
5	(Ukraine) Maryna Zanevska	6	3	6^{3}
7	(Spain) María Teresa Torró Flor	7^{11}	7
WC	(Czech Republic) Petra Cetkovská	6^{9}	5

Final
1	(Czech Republic) Denisa Allertová	3	6^{5}
7	(Spain) María Teresa Torró Flor	6	7^{7}

=== Top half ===
First round
1	(Czech Republic) D Allertová	6	6
(Greece) M Sakkari	2	3
(Czech Republic) R Voráčová	2	6^{5}
WC	(Czech Republic) M Vondroušová	6	7^{7}
(Russia) M Melnikova	4	4
(Belgium) Y Bonaventure	6	6
Q	(Spain) G García Pérez	3	4
6	(Russia) A Panova	6	6
4	(Netherlands) R Hogenkamp	5	0^{r}
WC	(Czech Republic) K Muchová	7	0
(Czech Republic) B Krejčíková	3	0
(Slovakia) K Kučová	6	6
Q	(Czech Republic) M Borecká	3	4
Q	(Russia) A Komardina	6	6
Q	(Netherlands) A Rus	4	6	4
5	(Ukraine) M Zanevska	6	3	6

Second round
1	(Czech Republic) D Allertová	6	6
WC	(Czech Republic) M Vondroušová	2	2
(Belgium) Y Bonaventure	3	7^{7}	3
6	(Russia) A Panova	6	6^{5}	0^{r}
WC	(Czech Republic) K Muchová	6^{4}	6	0^{r}
(Slovakia) K Kučová	7^{7}	4	4
Q	(Russia) A Komardina	2	2
5	(Ukraine) M Zanevska	6	6

Quarterfinals
1	(Czech Republic) D Allertová	4	6	6
(Belgium) Y Bonaventure	6	4	3
(Slovakia) K Kučová	3	0
5	(Ukraine) M Zanevska	6	6

Semifinals
1	(Czech Republic) D Allertová	0	6	7^{7}
5	(Ukraine) M Zanevska	6	3	6^{3}

=== Bottom half ===
First round
7	(Spain) MT Torró Flor	7	6
PR	(Russia) V Kan	5	3
(Poland) K Piter	6	7
(Sweden) R Peterson	4	5
(Bulgaria) E Kostova	4	4
WC	(Czech Republic) N Vaidišová	6	6
(Spain) L Pous Tió	6	6
3	(Czech Republic) K Koukalová	2	2
8	(Latvia) A Sevastova	5	0^{r}
WC	(Czech Republic) P Cetkovská	7	0
(Romania) S Cîrstea	6	6
(Czech Republic) T Martincová	1	1
(Czech Republic) K Vaňková	2	4
(Spain) S Sorribes Tormo	6	6
(Italy) A Brianti	1	1
2	(Spain) L Domínguez Lino	6	6

Second round
7	(Spain) MT Torró Flor	6^{3}	6	7
(Poland) K Piter	7^{7}	3	5
WC	(Czech Republic) N Vaidišová	6	4	6
(Spain) L Pous Tió	1	6	0
WC	(Czech Republic) P Cetkovská	7^{7}	4	6
(Romania) S Cîrstea	6^{5}	6	3
(Spain) S Sorribes Tormo	6	6
2	(Spain) L Domínguez Lino	4	2

Quarterfinals
7	(Spain) MT Torró Flor	7	6
WC	(Czech Republic) N Vaidišová	5	1
WC	(Czech Republic) P Cetkovská	6	0
(Spain) S Sorribes Tormo	3	0^{r}

Semifinals
7	(Spain) MT Torró Flor	7^{11}	7
WC	(Czech Republic) P Cetkovská	6^{9}	5
