= 2015 Advantage Cars Prague Open – Men's doubles =

Men's doubles
- 2015 Advantage Cars Prague Open

Final
- Champions: (Netherlands) Wesley Koolhof (Netherlands) Matwé Middelkoop
- Runners-up: (Belarus) Sergey Betov (Russia) Mikhail Elgin
- Score: 6–4, 3–6, [10–7]

Events
Singles	men	women
Doubles	men	women
- Advantage Cars Prague Open

The men's doubles of the 2015 Advantage Cars Prague Open tournament was played on clay in Prague, Czech Republic.

Toni Androić and Andrey Kuznetsov were the defending champions, but chose not to participate.

Wesley Koolhof and Matwé Middelkoop won the tournament, defeating Sergey Betov and Mikhail Elgin in the final, 6–4, 3–6, [10–7].

== Seeds ==
1. (New Zealand) Marcus Daniell / (Brazil) Marcelo Demoliner (quarterfinals)
2. (Belarus) Sergey Betov / (Russia) Mikhail Elgin (final)
3. (Czech Republic) František Čermák / (Australia) Rameez Junaid (first round)
4. (Netherlands) Wesley Koolhof / (Netherlands) Matwé Middelkoop (champions)

== Draw ==
Key

- Q = Qualifier
- WC = Wild card
- LL = Lucky loser
- Alt = Alternate
- ITF = ITF entry
- PR = Protected ranking
- SR = Special ranking
- SE = Special exempt
- JE = Junior exempt
- JR = Junior Accelerator Programme entrant
- CO = College Accelerator Programme entrant
- NG = Next Gen Accelerator Program entrant
- w/o = Walkover
- r = Retired
- d = Defaulted

First round
1	(New Zealand) M Daniell (Brazil) M Demoliner	6	3	[10]
(Italy) F Cipolla (United Kingdom) N Skupski	3	6	[4]
(Italy) A Motti (Spain) A Ramos-Viñolas	6	4	[9]
(Croatia) D Marcan (Chile) H Podlipnik Castillo	3	6	[11]
4	(Netherlands) W Koolhof (Netherlands) M Middelkoop	6	7^{7}
WC	(Slovakia) Adrian Sikora (Czech Republic) Robin Staněk	3	6^{3}
WC	(Czech Republic) J Mertl (Czech Republic) Libor Salaba	6	7^{7}
(Hungary) M Fucsovics (Kazakhstan) A Nedovyesov	0	6^{0}
WC	(Serbia) I Bozoljac (Netherlands) S Groen	4	4
(Mexico) C Ramírez (Mexico) MÁ Reyes-Varela	6	6
(Poland) M Kowalczyk (Slovakia) I Zelenay	7	6
3	(Czech Republic) F Čermák (Australia) R Junaid	5	3
(Moldova) R Albot (Czech Republic) A Pavlásek	4	3
(Argentina) F Argüello (Croatia) A Šančić	6	6
(Germany) A Satschko (Germany) J-L Struff	5	2
2	(Belarus) S Betov (Russia) M Elgin	7	6

Quarterfinals
1	(New Zealand) M Daniell (Brazil) M Demoliner	4	1
(Croatia) D Marcan (Chile) H Podlipnik Castillo	6	6
4	(Netherlands) W Koolhof (Netherlands) M Middelkoop	6	6
WC	(Czech Republic) J Mertl (Czech Republic) L Salaba	2	3
(Mexico) C Ramírez (Mexico) MÁ Reyes-Varela	5	6	[6]
(Poland) M Kowalczyk (Slovakia) I Zelenay	7	3	[10]
(Argentina) F Argüello (Croatia) A Šančić	3	4
2	(Belarus) S Betov (Russia) M Elgin	6	6

Semifinals
(Croatia) D Marcan (Chile) H Podlipnik Castillo	3	6^{7}
4	(Netherlands) W Koolhof (Netherlands) M Middelkoop	6	7^{9}
(Poland) M Kowalczyk (Slovakia) I Zelenay	3	6^{4}
2	(Belarus) S Betov (Russia) M Elgin	6	7^{7}

Final
4	(Netherlands) W Koolhof (Netherlands) M Middelkoop	6	3	[10]
2	(Belarus) S Betov (Russia) M Elgin	4	6	[7]
