= 2012 The Oaks Club Challenger – Singles =

Singles
- 2012 The Oaks Club Challenger

Final
- Champion: (Netherlands) Arantxa Rus
- Runner-up: (Kazakhstan) Sesil Karatantcheva
- Score: 6–4, 6–1

Events
Singles	Doubles
← 2011 ·	The Oaks Club Challenger	· 2013 →

Claire de Gubernatis was the defending champion, but chose not to participate.

Arantxa Rus won the title, defeating Sesil Karatantcheva in the final, 6–4, 6–1.

== Seeds ==
1. (Czech Republic) Lucie Hradecká (quarterfinals)
2. (Belarus) Anastasiya Yakimova (first round)
3. (Russia) Alexandra Panova (semifinals)
4. (Luxembourg) Mandy Minella (first round)
5. (Romania) Edina Gallovits-Hall (semifinals)
6. (United States) Irina Falconi (second round)
7. (Russia) Nina Bratchikova (first round)
8. (Australia) Anastasia Rodionova (second round)

== Main draw ==
=== Key ===
- Q = Qualifier
- WC = Wild card
- LL = Lucky loser
- Alt = Alternate
- SE = Special exempt
- PR = Protected ranking
- ITF = ITF entry
- JE = Junior exempt
- w/o = Walkover
- r = Retired
- d = Defaulted
- SR = Special ranking

=== Finals ===
Semifinals
5	(Romania) Edina Gallovits-Hall	4	4
(Netherlands) Arantxa Rus	6	6
3	(Russia) Alexandra Panova	6^{6}	3
(Kazakhstan) Sesil Karatantcheva	7^{8}	6

Final
(Netherlands) Arantxa Rus	6	6
(Kazakhstan) Sesil Karatantcheva	4	1

=== Top half ===
First round
1	(Czech Republic) L Hradecká	6	6^{4}	6
(Hungary) M Czink	2	7^{7}	3
(United Kingdom) L Robson	3	7^{8}	4
JE	(Canada) E Bouchard	6	6^{6}	6
(Croatia) M Lučić	2	4
(Switzerland) S Vögele	6	6
(Uzbekistan) A Amanmuradova	2	4
5	(Romania) E Gallovits-Hall	6	6
4	(Luxembourg) M Minella	6^{3}	2
Q	(Argentina) F Molinero	7^{7}	6
Q	(Slovakia) J Čepelová	3^{r}
(Czech Republic) Ka Plíšková	3
(Japan) M Doi	2	6	4
(Netherlands) A Rus	6	3	6
Q	(United States) G Min	4	6	3
6	(United States) I Falconi	6	4	6

Second round
1	(Czech Republic) L Hradecká	7	6
JE	(Canada) E Bouchard	5	1
(Switzerland) S Vögele	3	6^{3}
5	(Romania) E Gallovits-Hall	6	7^{7}
Q	(Argentina) F Molinero	6	1	6
(Czech Republic) Ka Plíšková	3	6	4
(Netherlands) A Rus	4	6	6
6	(United States) I Falconi	6	1	4

Quarterfinals
1	(Czech Republic) L Hradecká	7	3	2
5	(Romania) E Gallovits-Hall	5	6	6
Q	(Argentina) F Molinero	2	2
(Netherlands) A Rus	6	6

Semifinals
5	(Romania) E Gallovits-Hall	4	4
(Netherlands) A Rus	6	6

=== Bottom half ===
First round
7	(Russia) N Bratchikova	4	6	0
(Russia) V Savinykh	6	3	6
WC	(United States) M Brengle	2	2
(Spain) L Arruabarrena Vecino	6	6
WC	(United States) C Dailey	1	2
Q	(United States) C Vandeweghe	6	6
LL	(France) K Mladenovic	4	2
3	(Russia) A Panova	6	6
8	(Australia) A Rodionova	7	3	6
(Ukraine) L Tsurenko	5	6	3
WC	(United States) M Oudin	5	2
(France) A Cornet	7	6
WC	(United States) J Pegula	2	7^{7}	7^{7}
(Russia) A Kudryavtseva	6	6^{1}	6^{5}
(Kazakhstan) S Karatantcheva	6	6
2	(Belarus) A Yakimova	1	3

Second round
(Russia) V Savinykh	4	4
(Spain) L Arruabarrena Vecino	6	6
Q	(United States) C Vandeweghe	3	1
3	(Russia) A Panova	6	6
8	(Australia) A Rodionova	2	3
(France) A Cornet	6	6
WC	(United States) J Pegula	3	6	1
(Kazakhstan) S Karatantcheva	6	4	6

Quarterfinals
(Spain) L Arruabarrena Vecino	6	5	0
3	(Russia) A Panova	3	7	6
(France) A Cornet	6^{3}	4
(Kazakhstan) S Karatantcheva	7^{7}	6

Semifinals
3	(Russia) A Panova	6^{6}	3
(Kazakhstan) S Karatantcheva	7^{8}	6
