= 2015 Advantage Cars Prague Open – Women's doubles =

Women's doubles
- 2015 Advantage Cars Prague Open

Final
- Champions: (Czech Republic) Kateřina Kramperová (United States) Bernarda Pera
- Runners-up: (Czech Republic) Miriam Kolodziejová (Czech Republic) Markéta Vondroušová
- Score: 7–6^{(7–4)}, 5–7, [10–1]

Events
Singles	men	women
Doubles	men	women
- Advantage Cars Prague Open

The women's doubles of the 2015 Advantage Cars Prague Open tournament was played on clay in Prague, Czech Republic.

This was the 11th edition of the tournament.

Kateřina Kramperová and Bernarda Pera won the inaugural edition, defeating wildcards Miriam Kolodziejová and Markéta Vondroušová in the final, 7–6^{(7–4)}, 5–7, [10–1].

== Seeds ==
1. (Czech Republic) Klára Koukalová / (Czech Republic) Renata Voráčová (semifinals)
2. (Belgium) Ysaline Bonaventure / (Slovakia) Janette Husárová (quarterfinals)
3. (Czech Republic) Barbora Krejčíková / (Sweden) Rebecca Peterson (first round)
4. (Poland) Katarzyna Piter / (Ukraine) Maryna Zanevska (first round)

== Draw ==
Key

- Q = Qualifier
- WC = Wild card
- LL = Lucky loser
- Alt = Alternate
- ITF = ITF entry
- PR = Protected ranking
- SR = Special ranking
- SE = Special exempt
- JE = Junior exempt
- JR = Junior Accelerator Programme entrant
- CO = College Accelerator Programme entrant
- NG = Next Gen Accelerator Program entrant
- w/o = Walkover
- r = Retired
- d = Defaulted

First round
1	(Czech Republic) K Koukalová (Czech Republic) R Voráčová	6	6
WC	(Czech Republic) D Allertová (Czech Republic) P Cetkovská	4	3
(Germany) A Klasen (Germany) A Schäfer	6	4	[13]
(Ukraine) A Fomina (Russia) V Ivakhnenko	4	6	[11]
3	(Czech Republic) B Krejčíková (Sweden) R Peterson	1	6	[4]
(Bulgaria) E Kostova (Czech Republic) K Vaňková	6	4	[10]
(Ukraine) O Ianchuk (Russia) V Kudermetova	6	3	[5]
WC	(Czech Republic) M Kolodziejová (Czech Republic) M Vondroušová	3	6	[10]
(Czech Republic) K Kramperová (United States) B Pera	6	5	[10]
WC	(Czech Republic) P Rohanová (Czech Republic) V Žovincová	1	7	[5]
(Germany) C Daniels (Belarus) L Marozava	6	6
4	(Poland) K Piter (Ukraine) M Zanevska	4	4
(Russia) M Melnikova (Spain) L Pous Tió	6	4	[11]
(Argentina) T Búa (Spain) G García Pérez	2	6	[13]
(Czech Republic) L Kunčíková (Czech Republic) K Stuchlá	3	7	[8]
2	(Belgium) Y Bonaventure (Slovakia) J Husárová	6	5	[10]

Quarterfinals
1	(Czech Republic) K Koukalová (Czech Republic) R Voráčová	6	6
(Germany) A Klasen (Germany) A Schäfer	3	0
(Bulgaria) E Kostova (Czech Republic) K Vaňková	0	2
WC	(Czech Republic) M Kolodziejová (Czech Republic) M Vondroušová	6	6
(Czech Republic) K Kramperová (United States) B Pera	6	2	[10]
(Germany) C Daniels (Belarus) L Marozava	4	6	[7]
(Argentina) T Búa (Spain) G García Pérez	6	3	[10]
2	(Belgium) Y Bonaventure (Slovakia) J Husárová	2	6	[7]

Semifinals
1	(Czech Republic) K Koukalová (Czech Republic) R Voráčová	4	6	[8]
WC	(Czech Republic) M Kolodziejová (Czech Republic) M Vondroušová	6	4	[10]
(Czech Republic) K Kramperová (United States) B Pera	6	6
(Argentina) T Búa (Spain) G García Pérez	3	2

Final
WC	(Czech Republic) M Kolodziejová (Czech Republic) M Vondroušová	6^{4}	7	[1]
(Czech Republic) K Kramperová (United States) B Pera	7^{7}	5	[10]
