= 2014 The Oaks Club Challenger =

- Date: March 24–30
- Edition: 6th
- Category: ITF Women's Circuit
- Prize money: $50,000
- Surface: Clay
- Location: Osprey, Florida, United States

Champions

Singles
- (Slovakia) Anna Karolína Schmiedlová

Doubles
- (Japan) Rika Fujiwara / (Chinese Taipei) Hsieh Shu-ying
- The Oaks Club Challenger

The 2014 The Oaks Club Challenger was a professional tennis tournament played on outdoor clay courts. It was the sixth edition of the tournament and part of the 2014 ITF Women's Circuit, offering a total of $50,000 in prize money. It took place in Osprey, Florida, United States, on March 24–30, 2014.

== Singles main draw entrants ==
=== Seeds ===
Country	Player	Rank^{1}	Seed
NZL	Marina Erakovic	68	1
SVK	Anna Karolína Schmiedlová	73	2
SVK	Jana Čepelová	76	3
ESP	Lourdes Domínguez Lino	77	4
GER	Dinah Pfizenmaier	79	5
FRA	Virginie Razzano	81	6
CZE	Petra Cetkovská	83	7
ISR	Julia Glushko	86	8

- ^{1} Rankings as of March 17, 2014

=== Other entrants ===
The following players received wildcards into the singles main draw:

- (United States) Jan Abaza
- (United States) Madison Brengle
- (United States) Julia Cohen
- (United States) Jennifer Elie

The following players received entry from the qualifying draw:

- (Australia) Ashleigh Barty
- (Czech Republic) Lucie Hradecká
- (Kazakhstan) Yulia Putintseva
- (Ukraine) Olga Savchuk

The following player received entry into the singles main draw as a lucky loser:

- (Belarus) Ilona Kremen

=== Withdrawals ===
Before the tournament

- (Luxembourg) Mandy Minella (edema in right arm)
- (China) Zhang Shuai (shoulder injury)
- (Czech Republic) Barbora Záhlavová-Strýcová

== Champions ==
=== Singles ===
- (Slovakia) Anna Karolína Schmiedlová def. (New Zealand) Marina Erakovic 6–2, 6–3

=== Doubles ===
- (Japan) Rika Fujiwara / (Chinese Taipei) Hsieh Shu-ying def. (United States) Irina Falconi / (Czech Republic) Eva Hrdinová 6–3, 6–7^{(5–7)}, [10–4]
