= Melanie Oudin =

American tennis player (born 1991)

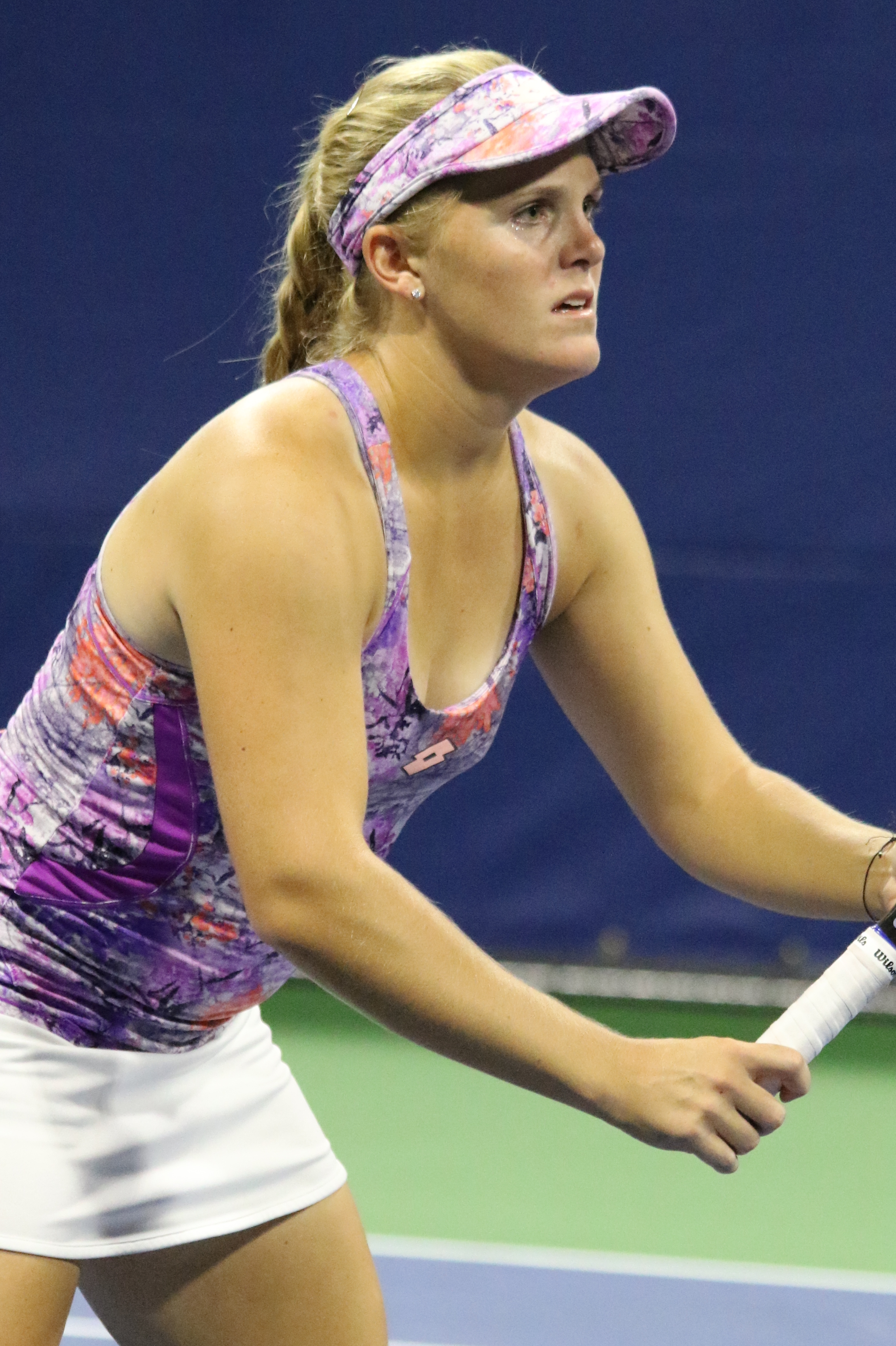
- Oudin at the 2016 US Open
- Country (sports): United States
- Residence: Marietta, Georgia
- Born: September 23, 1991 (age 35) Marietta, Georgia
- Height: 5 ft 6 in (1.68 m)
- Turned pro: 2008
- Retired: August 18, 2017
- Plays: Right-handed (two-handed backhand)
- Prize money: US$ 1,535,204

Singles
- Career record: 245–202
- Career titles: 1 WTA, 6 ITF
- Highest ranking: No. 31 (April 19, 2010)

Grand Slam singles results
- Australian Open: 1R (2009, 2010, 2011, 2013)
- French Open: 2R (2012, 2013)
- Wimbledon: 4R (2009)
- US Open: QF (2009)

Doubles
- Career record: 76–94
- Career titles: 0 WTA, 2 ITF
- Highest ranking: No. 125 (May 23, 2011)

Grand Slam doubles results
- Australian Open: 1R (2010)
- French Open: 2R (2010)
- Wimbledon: 1R (2010)
- US Open: 2R (2010)

Mixed doubles
- Career titles: 1

Grand Slam mixed doubles results
- US Open: W (2011)

Melanie Jennings Oudin (born September 23, 1991) is an American former professional tennis player. The former world junior No. 2 was a member of the American Fed Cup team from 2009 to 2011 and the winner of the 2011 US Open mixed-doubles title, with fellow American player Jack Sock.

As a 17-year-old in the middle of 2009, Oudin reached the round of 16 of the Wimbledon Championships, followed by a quarterfinal at the US Open six weeks later. She reached a career-high ranking of world No. 31 in April 2010.

Oudin retired from professional tour on August 18, 2017, citing numerous health issues and injuries.

== Personal life ==
Oudin, a Marietta, Georgia native, has a twin sister, Katherine, and a younger sister, Christina. Introduced to the sport at the age of seven alongside sister Katherine, Melanie showed early promise. As she continued to improve, her time spent on the court increased as well. In seventh grade, she made the decision to homeschool, giving her more time on the practice courts and an opportunity to play more tournaments. In an article with Atlanta Magazine, Oudin said, "If I was going to homeschool, I was going to try to go pro for sure". While the decision proved to be very beneficial for her career, Oudin admits envying her twin sister's experiences at a regular school. She says her idol is Justine Henin because "she proved you don't have to be tall to win things." Her grandmother inspired her and her sister to play tennis when she gave them racquets and lessons when they were young.

== Tennis career ==
=== 2008–09: Breakthrough on WTA Tour, US Open quarterfinal, and top-50 ranking ===
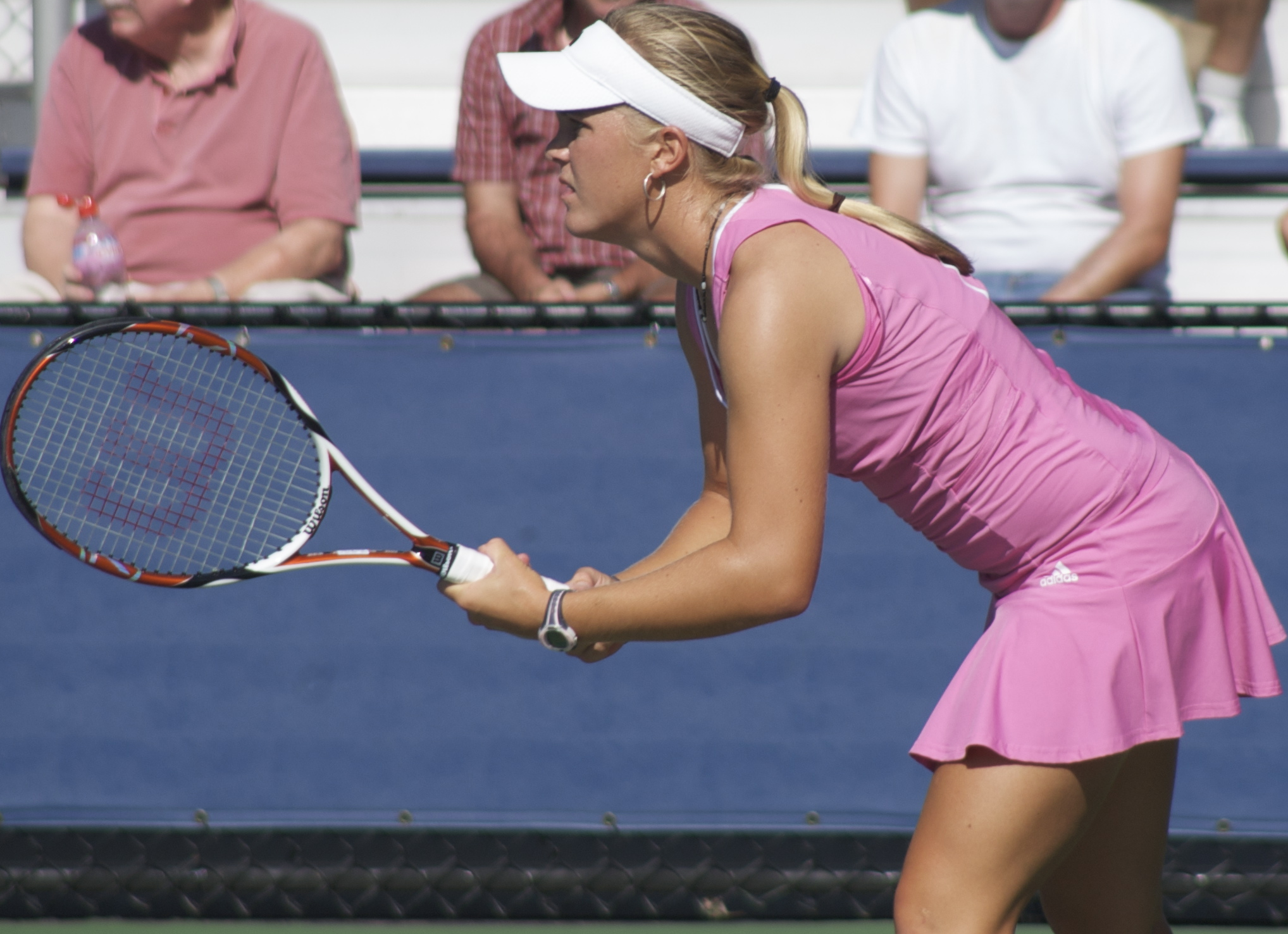
Oudin at the 2008 US Open

Oudin turned professional in February 2008. In April 2008, she received a wildcard at the WTA tournament in Miami where she lost in the first round to Tathiana Garbin, in three sets. In August, Oudin received a wildcard into her first Grand Slam main draw at the US Open. She was defeated by Australian Jessica Moore, 7–6, 7–6.

In October that year, Oudin participated in the Bell Challenge in Quebec City. In the first round, she defeated third seed Sybille Bammer. In the second round, she defeated Olga Puchkova in two sets. Reaching her first WTA quarterfinal, she was defeated by sixth seed Bethanie Mattek.

Oudin began 2009 by qualifying for the main draw of the Australian Open. She was then defeated in the first round by Akgul Amanmuradova, in straight sets.

At Wimbledon, Oudin entered as a qualifier. She defeated No. 29, Sybille Bammer, in three sets in the first round, and Yaroslava Shvedova in three sets in the second. Oudin defeated also world No. 6, Jelena Janković, but lost to Agnieszka Radwańska in the fourth round.

At the US Open, Oudin entered as a wildcard. In her first-round match, she easily defeated Anastasia Pavlyuchenkova 6–1, 6–2. In the second round, she stunned fourth-seeded Elena Dementieva in her Arthur Ashe Stadium debut. Then in the third round, she defeated a resurgent Maria Sharapova. At 17 years of age, Oudin reached the fourth round of a major event for the second consecutive time. In the fourth round, she played another Russian, 13th-seeded Nadia Petrova. She defeated Petrova to reach the quarterfinals of the event. She became the youngest woman since Serena Williams in 1999 to reach the quarterfinals at the US Open, and the youngest since Sharapova to reach the quarterfinals at a major. Her Cinderella story ended when ninth-seeded Caroline Wozniacki defeated her, 6–2, 6–2. A standing ovation occurred when Oudin was leaving the court. After the US Open, Oudin's ranking rose into the top 50, her first appearance there.

=== 2010: Steady form ===
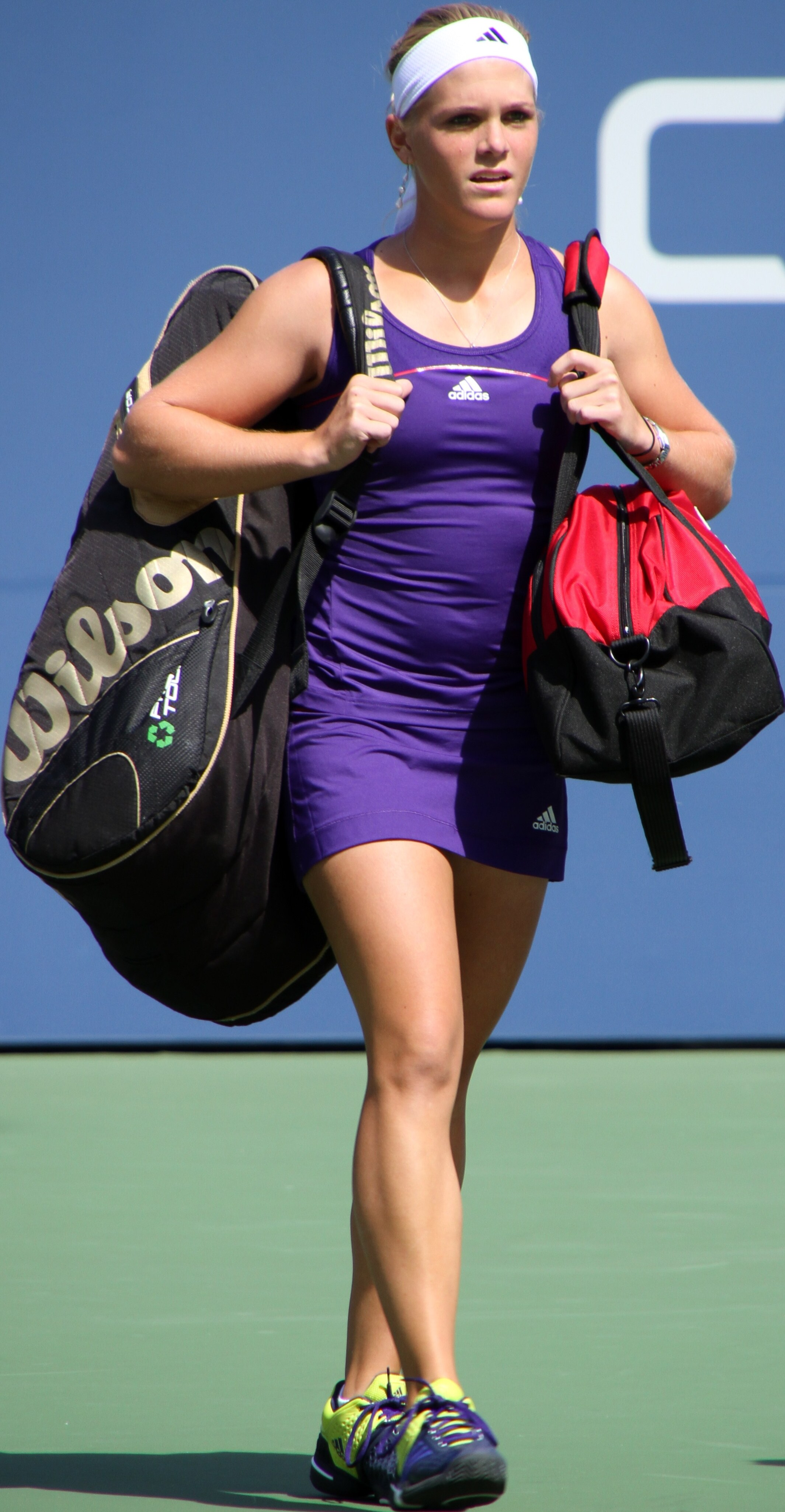
Oudin at the 2010 US Open

Oudin began new season at the Hobart International where she lost to Sara Errani in the first round. At the Australian Open, she was defeated in the first round by Alla Kudryavtseva.

During the Fed Cup tie versus France, Oudin won both of her rubbers over Pauline Parmentier and Julie Coin. The U.S. team won the tie over France 4–1 to move on to the semifinal round. Oudin reached her first semifinal of a WTA Tour event at the Paris indoor event. She fell in three sets to top seed Elena Dementieva, in a rematch of their 2009 US Open second-round match. Seeded second at the Cellular South Cup, Oudin made it to the quarterfinal round where she lost to qualifier and eventual finalist Sofia Arvidsson. In March, she played at the Indian Wells Open where she was defeated in the first round by Roberta Vinci. At the Miami Open, Oudin lost in the second round to 11th seed Vera Zvonareva. Seeded eighth at Amelia Island, she eliminated in the quarterfinal round by fourth seed Elena Vesnina.

=== 2011: Singles downfall, mixed-doubles Grand Slam title ===
In January, she obtained an invitation to play at the Hong Kong Tennis Classic with compatriots Venus Williams and John McEnroe. At Hobart, Oudin was defeated in the first round by fifth seed Klára Zakopalová in straight sets. In the first round of the Australian Open, she lost to Zakopalová 1–6, 6–3, 1–6.

In the Fed Cup tie against Belgium, Oudin lost her first rubber to Kim Clijsters, 0–6, 4–6. In her final rubber, she was defeated by Yanina Wickmayer 6–2, 6–0. Belgium reached the semifinals at the Fed Cup defeating the USA 4–1. Oudin got her first win of the year at Paris, where she beat Vera Dushevina in the first round in three sets. In the second round, Oudin lost to eighth seed Dominika Cibulková of Slovakia. Having reached the semifinals the year before, Oudin's ranking dropped from No. 61 to No. 72. Oudin's next tournament was the Memphis South Cup. Seeded third, she won her first-round match against Anastasia Pivovarova 6–4, 6–0. In the second, she faced Evgeniya Rodina, only to lose 1–6, 5–7. Oudin was unable to defend her quarterfinal points from last year and therefore saw her ranking fall from No. 72 to No. 81. At the Mexican Open, she retired from her first-round match against qualifier Lesia Tsurenko. Ranked 82 at the Monterrey Open, Oudin won her first-round match over fellow American Vania King 6–4, 6–1. She was defeated in the second round by second seed and eventual champion, Anastasia Pavlyuchenkova. Ranked 84 at Indian Wells, Oudin won her first-round match over Elena Vesnina. However, she was eliminated in the second round by 23rd seed Yanina Wickmayer. Moving on to Miami, Oudin started the tournament well with a first-round win over Julia Görges but was defeated in the second by 29th seed Daniela Hantuchová, 6–1, 6–3.

Oudin began her clay-court season at Charleston where she lost in the first round to Tamira Paszek. In the 2011 Fed Cup World Group play-offs tie versus Germany, Oudin lost both of her rubbers to Julia Görges and Andrea Petkovic. Germany defeated the USA 5–0. As a result, the U.S. team was out of the World Group for the first time. Ranked 93 at the Morocco Open, Oudin upset third seed Lourdes Domínguez Lino in the first round 4–6, 6–1, 6–2. She reached the quarterfinals when her second round opponent, Polona Hercog, withdrew due to an ankle injury. In the quarterfinals, Oudin lost to eventual champion Alberta Brianti. At the Estoril Open, Oudin lost in the first round to qualifier and fellow American Sloane Stephens, 2–6, 1–6. Competing at the Internationaux de Strasbourg, she lost in the first round to seventh seed Anabel Medina Garrigues in straight sets. Ranked 88 at the French Open, Oudin lost in the first round to fifth seed and defending champion Francesca Schiavone, 2–6, 0–6.

Oudin started her grass-court season at the Nottingham Trophy. Seeded fourth, she lost in the second round to Sloane Stephens. At the Miami Open, a tournament that is not on grass, Oudin was defeated in the first round by Michaëlla Krajicek. Playing at Eastbourne, Oudin lost in the final round of qualifying to Zheng Jie 1–6, 4–6. Ranked 87 at Wimbledon, Oudin was defeated in the first round by 18th seed Ana Ivanovic, 6–0, 6–1.

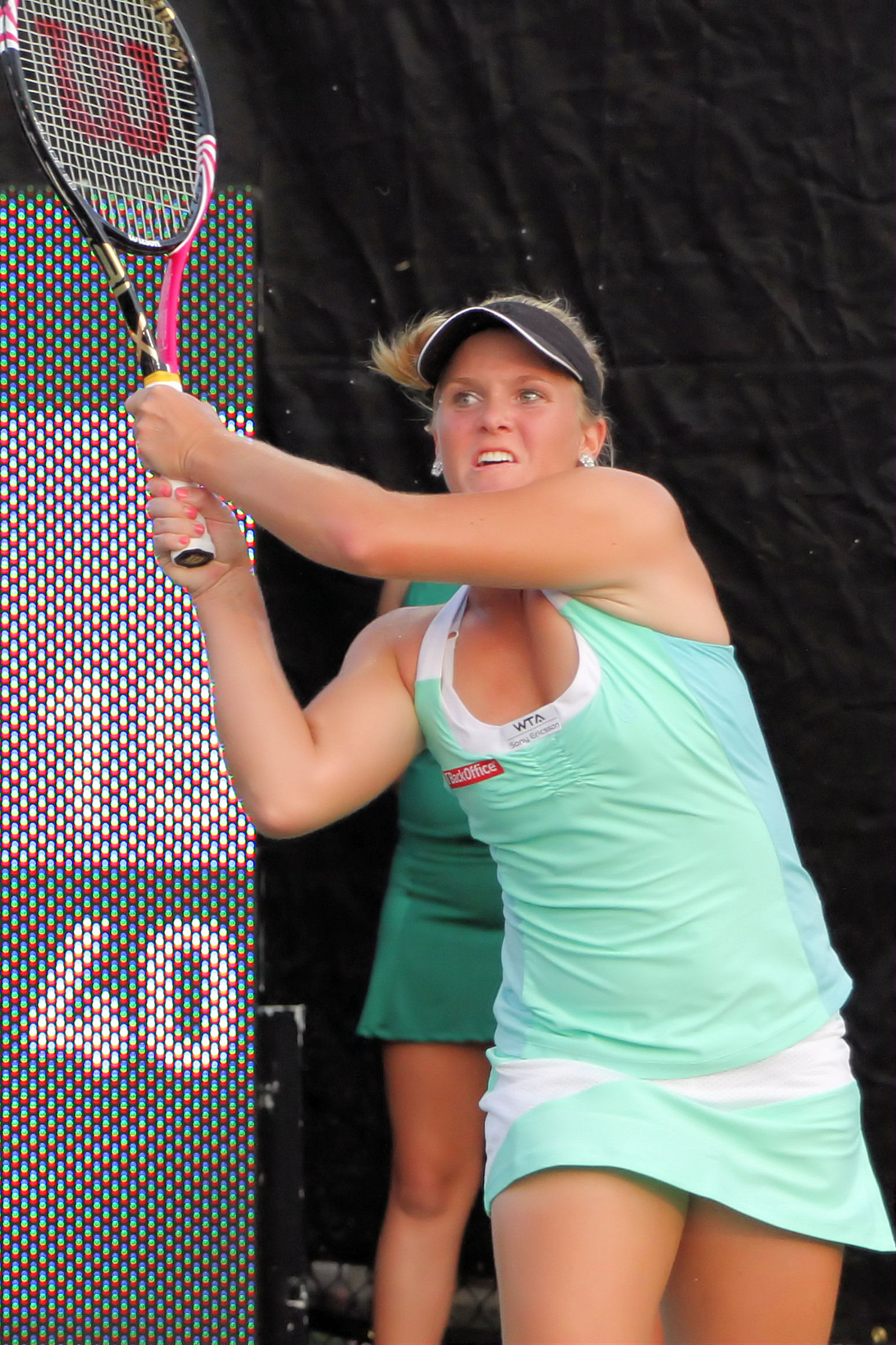
Oudin at the 2011 Texas Open

As the top seed at the Lexington Challenger, Oudin lost in the first round to Chanel Simmonds. Oudin started her US Open Series by competing at the first edition of the Washington Open where she fell in the first round to third seed Tamira Paszek. At the Carlsbad Open, Oudin was crushed in the first round by Elena Baltacha, 6–0, 6–1. Oudin lost in the first round of qualifying at the Canadian Open and the Cincinnati Open to fifth seed Bojana Jovanovski (4–6, 2–6) and 15th seed Kateryna Bondarenko (1–6, 4–6). In her next tournament, she received a wildcard entry into the singles main draw at the first edition of the Texas Open. In the first round, she was up against lucky loser Akgul Amanmuradova. Oudin was leading 7–6, 1–0 when her opponent retired due to a lower back injury. In the second round, she lost to qualifier Angelique Kerber, 3–6, 2–6. Ranked 113 at the US Open, Oudin lost in the first round to qualifier Romina Oprandi. However, in mixed doubles, she and Jack Sock captured the title defeating the eighth seeded Argentine pairing of Gisela Dulko and Eduardo Schwank in the final.

At the Challenge Bell, Oudin was defeated in the first round by Andrea Hlaváčková, in straight sets. Seeded seventh at the ITF Albuquerque, Oudin lost in the second round to eventual champion Regina Kulikova. Playing at the Las Vegas Open, Oudin fell in the first round to Sesil Karatantcheva.

Oudin played her final tournament of the year at the Tennis Classic of Troy. Seeded fifth, she lost in the first round to Karatantcheva 1–6, 3–6.

Oudin ended the year ranked 139.

=== 2012: Inconsistency, first WTA Tour singles title ===
At the beginning of the season, Oudin lost in the first round of qualifying at the Australian Open to Laura Robson.

In February, Oudin competed at the Dow Tennis Classic in Midland. She was defeated in the first round by sixth seed Stéphanie Foretz Gacon. Seeded seventh at the $25k tournament in Surprise, Oudin lost in the first round to Olga Puchkova. At the Memphis International, Oudin was defeated in the first round by Stéphanie Foretz Gacon. In Osprey at the Oaks Club Challenger, Oudin lost in the first round to Alizé Cornet.

Qualifying for the Charleston Cup, Oudin lost in the first round to tenth seed Anabel Medina Garrigues. At the Dothan Pro Tennis Classic, Oudin was defeated in the second round by fourth seed Mirjana Lučić. On April 29, Oudin won the $50k Clay Court Classic defeating second seed and fellow American Irina Falconi in the final. At the beginning of the season, Oudin lost in the first round of qualifying at the Australian Open to Laura Robson.

She was awarded the USTA French Open wildcard, on account of her performance in the USTA Pro Circuit. At the French Open, Oudin drew Johanna Larsson of Sweden in the first round and won 6–3, 6–3. It was her first win ever at the French Open. In the second round, she lost to 21st seed and eventual finalist, Sara Errani, in straight sets.

Oudin began her grass-court season at the Nottingham Trophy. After qualifying for the main draw, she lost in the first round to Heather Watson. Next, Oudin competed at the Birmingham Classic where she qualified for the main draw beating eighth seed Bibiane Schoofs and 16th seed Gail Brodsky. In the main draw, Oudin advanced to her first WTA Tour final defeating tenth seed Sorana Cîrstea, qualifier Michelle Larcher De Brito, Elena Vesnina, Irina Falconi, and eighth seed Ekaterina Makarova. The tournament was filled with rain delays and Oudin had to cope with the difficulty of coming off and on the court. She then defeated fifth seed Jelena Janković in the final to win her first WTA title. Winning the tournament bumped up her ranking from 208 to 122. Her performance earned her one of seven wildcard entries given by Wimbledon into the main draw. In the first round, she lost to world No. 69, Tímea Babos, in three sets.

At the US Open, No. 107 ranked Oudin was unseeded and lost to 15th seed Lucie Šafářová of the Czech Republic in straight sets. In the women's doubles, she also lost in the first round teaming up with Grace Min.

=== 2013: Loss of form, out of top 100 ===
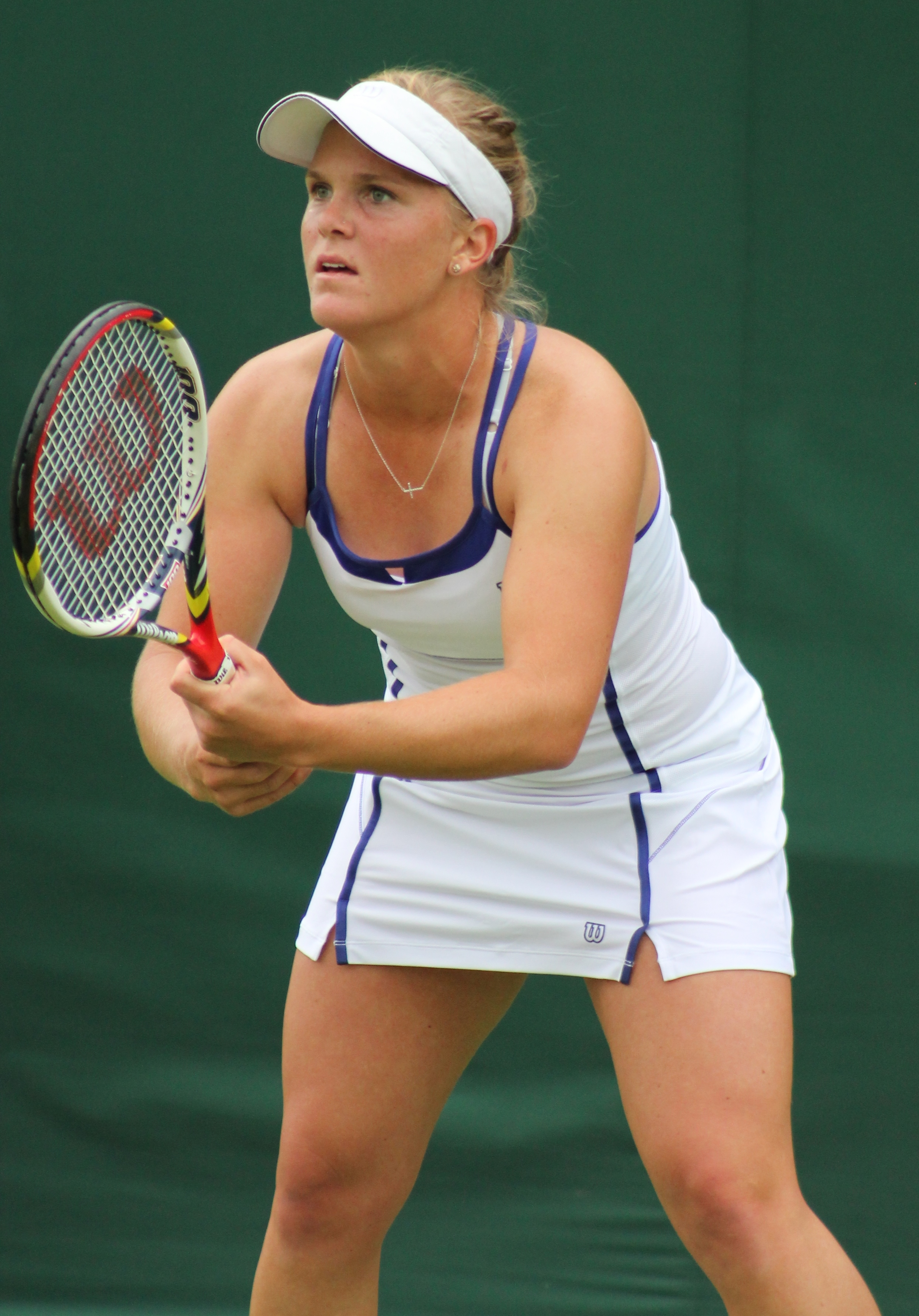
Oudin at the 2013 Wimbledon Championships

Oudin started her 2013 season at the Sydney International, and lost in the second round of qualifying to Estrella Cabeza Candela. At the Australian Open, Oudin was defeated in the first round by Laura Robson.

Competing in Tennessee at the U.S. National Indoor Championships, Oudin lost in the first round to Andrea Hlaváčková. In March, she was defeated in the first round at Indian Wells by wildcard and compatriot Madison Keys. At Miami, she lost in the first round of qualifying to Alexa Glatch. Seeded eighth at The Oaks Club Challenger, Oudin was defeated in the first round by Estrella Cabeza Candela.

She began her preparation for the French Open at the Family Circle Cup where she lost in the first round to ninth seed, 2007 champion, and eventual finalist Jelena Janković. At the Portugal Open, Oudin was defeated in the first round of qualifying by Valeria Savinykh. Oudin fell in the final round of qualifying at the Madrid Open to Chanelle Scheepers. Getting past qualifying at the Italian Open, Oudin won her first-round match when her opponent, Ekaterina Makarova, retired due to a left achilles tendon injury. Despite winning the first set, she lost in the second round to 14th seed Dominika Cibulková. Entering the Brussels Open after coming through qualifying, Oudin was defeated in the first round by Romina Oprandi. At the French Open, Oudin upset 28th seed Tamira Paszek in the first round but lost in the second to Jie Zheng.

Oudin started her grass-court season at Birmingham. Even though she was the defending champion, she was defeated in the first round by qualifier Ajla Tomljanović. At Eastbourne, Oudin advanced to the final round of qualifying where she lost to Olga Puchkova. At the Wimbledon Championships, she was defeated in the first round by qualifier Michelle Larcher de Brito.

Oudin began US Open Series at the Washington Open where she reached the second round, and lost to top seed Angelique Kerber. At the Western & Southern Open, Oudin was defeated in the first round of qualifying by Chanelle Scheepers. Playing at the US Open, Oudin lost in the first round of qualifying to Elena Baltacha.

During the week of September ninth, Oudin competed in Quebec City at the Challenge Bell. After coming through the qualifying rounds, she was defeated in the first round by second seed Kristina Mladenovic. Seeded sixth at the Coleman Vision Championships, Oudin lost in her second-round match to Petra Rampre. Oudin won the Party Rock Open, a $50k tournament in Las Vegas, beating compatriot CoCo Vandeweghe in the final. Seeded third at the $25k tournament in Rock Hill, South Carolina, Oudin made it to the semifinal where she was defeated by top seed Mariana Duque. Seeded third in Canada at the Challenger de Saguenay, Oudin lost in the semifinal round to second seed Coco Vandeweghe. Oudin stayed in Canada to compete at the Tevlin Challenger in Toronto. Seeded third, she was defeated in her semifinal match by Tímea Babos. Oudin competed in her final tournament of the season at the South Seas Island Resort Pro Classic and lost in the first round to compatriot Allie Kiick.

Oudin ended the season ranked 127.

== Fed Cup ==
Oudin played singles in the United States' Fed Cup tie against Argentina in February 2009, losing her first match against Gisela Dulko, but winning the second match against Betina Jozami in three sets.

In November 2009, Oudin lost both of her matches (against Flavia Pennetta and Francesca Schiavone) in the championship round of the 2009 Fed Cup.

In the 2010 Fed Cup, Oudin led the US to a 4–1 victory over France by defeating Pauline Parmentier and Julie Coin. Against Russia, Oudin then defeated Alla Kudryavtseva in her first singles match, while losing to Elena Dementieva in her second match. Her team still advanced to the final in San Diego. Contrary to expectations, lower ranked CoCo Vandeweghe was chosen over Oudin for the first singles match against Francesca Schiavone. After the US team lost both matches on the first day, Oudin replaced Bethanie Mattek-Sands for the third singles match against Schiavone and won 6–3, 6–1. This kept her team in contention, but proved futile since Vandeweghe lost the next match against Flavia Pennetta. In the 2011 Fed Cup World Group tie against Belgium, Oudin lost both her singles matches against Kim Clijsters and Yanina Wickmayer. In April, she also lost her two matches in the 2011 Fed Cup World Group play-offs where the US dropped out of the World Group for the first time since its formation in 1995.

== Grand Slam finals ==
=== Mixed doubles: 1 (title) ===
Result	Year	Championship	Surface	Partner	Opponents	Score
Win	2011	US Open	Hard	(United States) Jack Sock	(Argentina) Gisela Dulko (Argentina) Eduardo Schwank	7–6^{(7–4)}, 4–6, [10–8]

== WTA career finals ==
=== Singles: 1 (title) ===
Legend Grand Slam tournaments Premier M & Premier 5 Premier International (1–0)	Finals by surface Hard (0–0) Grass (1–0) Clay (0–0) Carpet (0–0)

Result	W–L	Date	Tournament	Tier	Surface	Opponent	Score
Win	1–0	Jun 2012	Birmingham Classic, UK	International	Grass	(Serbia) Jelena Janković	6–4, 6–2

== ITF Circuit finals ==
Legend
$100,000 tournaments
$75,000 tournaments
$50,000 tournaments
$25,000 tournaments
$10,000 tournaments

=== Singles: 10 (6–4) ===
Result	W–L	Date	Tournament	Tier	Surface	Opponent	Score
Loss		Feb 2008	ITF Fort Walton Beach, United States	25,000	Clay	(Czech Republic) Barbora Strýcová	3–6, 7–5, 6–7^{(5)}
Win		Jul 2008	Lexington Challenger, United States	50,000	Hard	(United States) Carly Gullickson	6–4, 6–2
Win		May 2009	ITF Indian Harbour Beach, United States	50,000	Clay	(Germany) Laura Siegemund	7–5, 5–7, 6–2
Win		May 2009	ITF Raleigh, United States	50,000	Clay	(United States) Lindsay Lee-Waters	6–1, 2–6, 6–4
Loss		Nov 2010	ITF Phoenix, United States	75,000	Hard	Varvara Lepchenko	3–6, 6–7^{(5)}
Win		Apr 2012	ITF Charlottesville, United States	50,000	Clay	(United States) Irina Falconi	7–6^{(0)}, 3–6, 6–1
Win		Nov 2012	ITF New Braunfels, United States	50,000	Hard	(Colombia) Mariana Duque	6–1, 6–1
Win		Sep 2013	Henderson Open, United States	50,000	Hard	(United States) CoCo Vandeweghe	5–7, 6–3, 6–3
Loss		Jul 2014	ITF Carson, United States	50,000	Hard	(United States) Nicole Gibbs	4–6, 4–6
Loss		Sep 2016	ITF Atlanta, United States	50,000	Hard	(Belgium) Elise Mertens	4–6, 2–6

=== Doubles: 7 (2–5) ===
Result	W–L	Date	Tournament	Tier	Surface	Partner	Opponents	Score
Loss		July 21, 2008	Lexington Challenger, United States		Hard	(United States) Lindsay Lee-Waters	(Chinese Taipei) Chan Chin-wei (United States) Kimberly Couts	6–2, 2–6, [8–10]
Loss		September 25, 2011	ITF Albuquerque, United States		Hard	(United States) Grace Min	(United States) Alexa Glatch (United States) Asia Muhammed	6–4, 3–6, [2–10]
Loss		October 2, 2011	Henderson Open, United States		Hard	Varvara Lepchenko	Alexa Glatch (United States) Mashona Washington	4–6, 2–6
Loss		September 22, 2013	ITF Albuquerque, United States		Hard	(United States) Taylor Townsend	(Greece) Eleni Daniilidou (United States) CoCo Vandeweghe	4–6, 6–7^{(2)}
Loss		November 1, 2013	Toronto Challenger, Canada		Hard (i)	(United States) Jessica Pegula	(United States) Victoria Duval (Canada) Françoise Abanda	6–7^{(5)}, 6–2, [9–11]
Win		September 15, 2014	ITF Albuquerque, United States		Hard	(United States) Jan Abaza	(United States) Nicole Melichar (United States) Allie Will	6–2, 6–3
Win		June 11, 2016	Surbiton Trophy, UK		Grass	(United States) Sanaz Marand	(United States) Robin Anderson (Australia) Alison Bai	6–4, 7–5

== Grand Slam performance timelines ==
Key
W	F	SF	QF	#R	RR	Q#	DNQ	A	NH

(W) winner; (F) finalist; (SF) semifinalist; (QF) quarterfinalist; (#R) rounds 4, 3, 2, 1; (RR) round-robin stage; (Q#) qualification round; (DNQ) did not qualify; (A) absent; (NH) not held; (SR) strike rate (events won / competed); (W–L) win–loss record.

=== Singles ===
Tournament	2008	2009	2010	2011	2012	2013	2014	W–L
Australian Open	A	1R	1R	1R	Q1	1R	A	0–4
French Open	A	A	1R	1R	2R	2R	Q2	2–4
Wimbledon	A	4R	2R	1R	1R	1R	Q3	4–5
US Open	1R	QF	2R	1R	1R	Q1	Q3	5–5
Win–loss	0–1	7–3	2–4	0–4	1–3	1–3	0–0	11–18

=== Doubles ===
Tournament	2007	2008	2009	2010	2011	2012	2013	2014	2015	W–L
Australian Open	A	A	A	1R	1R	A	A	A	A	0–2
French Open	A	A	A	2R	1R	A	1R	A	A	1–3
Wimbledon	A	A	LQ	1R	1R	A	1R	A	A	0–3
US Open	1R	1R	1R	2R	1R	1R	2R	1R	1R	2–9
Win–loss	0–1	0–1	0–1	2–4	0–4	0–1	1–3	0–1	0–1	3–17

Awards
Preceded by (Denmark) Caroline Wozniacki	WTA Newcomer of the Year; 2009	Succeeded by (Czech Republic) Petra Kvitová
