= Alexa Glatch =

American professional tennis player (born 1989)

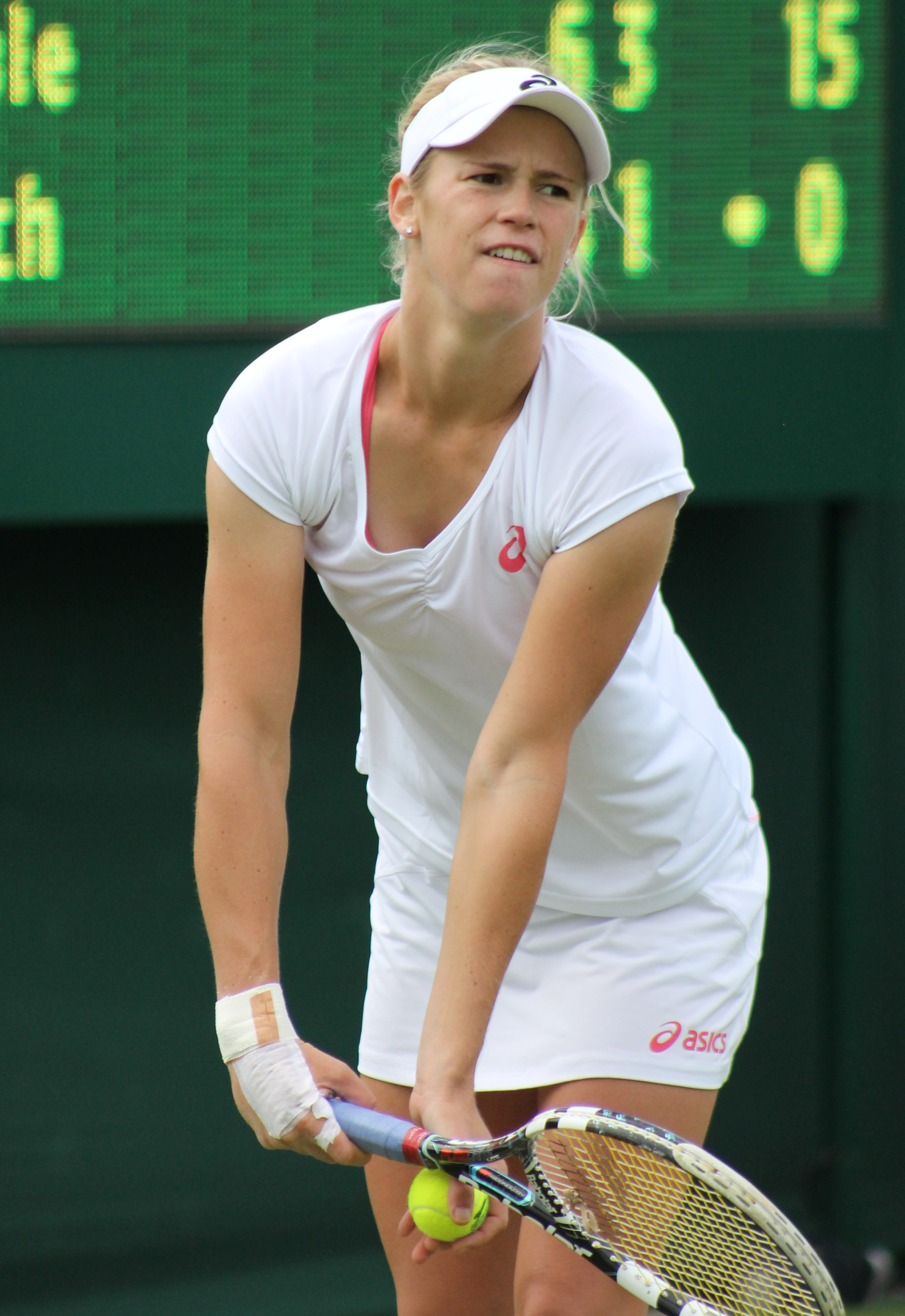
- Country (sports): United States
- Born: September 10, 1989 (age 36) Newport Beach, California, U.S.
- Height: 1.83 m (6 ft 0 in)
- Turned pro: 2005
- Retired: 2024
- Plays: Right (two-handed backhand)
- Prize money: US$ 825,740

Singles
- Career record: 327–260
- Career titles: 10 ITF
- Highest ranking: No. 102 (August 3, 2009)

Grand Slam singles results
- Australian Open: Q3 (2015)
- French Open: 2R (2009, 2012)
- Wimbledon: 1R (2009, 2011, 2013)
- US Open: 2R (2005)

Doubles
- Career record: 115–109
- Career titles: 9 ITF
- Highest ranking: No. 98 (October 5, 2009)

Grand Slam doubles results
- Wimbledon: 1R (2009)
- US Open: 3R (2009)
- Last updated on: June 23, 2024.

Alexa Glatch (born September 10, 1989) is an American former tennis player.

== Junior career ==
She started playing tennis at the age of five. As a junior player, she won the prestigious Easter Bowl title in the Girls-14s and Girls-18s divisions and the Orange Bowl in the Girls-16s division in 2004. She achieved a world junior ranking of No. 5 in 2005, advancing to the 2005 US Open finals in both singles and doubles. She lost the singles final to junior, and future senior world No. 1, Victoria Azarenka. She represented the United States in numerous international competitions including Junior Fed Cup.

== Professional career ==
Glatch turned professional in 2005 and in that year reached the semifinals of the Forest Hills Tennis Classic and the second round of the US Open. She was in an accident in November 2005; her injuries included a broken right wrist and left elbow. It took her eight months until she could start regularly playing competitive tennis again.

In 2007, she won the Southlake $25k USTA Pro Circuit event for her second career pro title and reached the quarterfinals of the Washington, D.C. $75k USTA Pro Circuit event. She was a finalist at the French Open junior doubles with partner Sorana Cîrstea of Romania. She also reached the quarterfinals of three $50k events. In 2008, Glatch reached the quarterfinals of the Dothan $75k USTA Pro Circuit event, was a finalist at the Carson $50k event, and was the singles champion at both the Toronto and Saguenay $50k events. She was one of three American women to make the 2008 US Open as a qualifier. She also had two semifinal finishes in doubles and won the doubles title at the $50k San Diego Pro Circuit tournament.

Glatch reached the third round of the 2009 Indian Wells Open as a wildcard; one of her wins was against world No. 29, Carla Suárez Navarro. At the 2009 Miami Open, Alexa advanced to the second round before losing to No. 1 seed, Serena Williams, 2–6, 3–6. She made her Fed Cup debut in April in the semifinals against the Czech Republic. As a rookie, she was dubbed the MVP for keeping the US alive by pulling off upset wins in both of her singles matches against No. 29, Iveta Benešová, and future world No. 2, Petra Kvitová, in straight sets.

In May 2009, Glatch made her French Open debut by defeating 14th-seeded clay-court specialist Flavia Pennetta in the first round.

Glatch lost in the first round of the 2009 US Open to defending champion Serena Williams. In women's doubles, Glatch played with fellow American Carly Gullickson and advanced to the round of 16.

In March 2012, she began working with Australian coach Sarah Stone, who is the former coach of 2011 US Open champion Samantha Stosur.

At the 2012 French Open, she won three matches and beat two seeds to qualify for the main draw. She defeated Anna Tatishvili to advance to the second round where she lost to 18th-seeded Flavia Pennetta.

In July 2012, she reached the second round of the Carlsbad Open, losing to former world No. 3, Nadia Petrova, 4–6 3–6.

In October 2012, Glatch won two back-to-back grass-court tournaments in Japan.

Following an appearance at Wimbledon in 2013, Glatch took 15 months off to deal with injuries. She had wrist and hip surgeries and went through extensive rehabilitation. Upon her return to competitive tennis in October 2014, she won the doubles event at the $50k Macon Pro Circuit event.

In 2015, Glatch used her protected singles ranking to enter the 2015 Australian Open qualifying, where she defeated No. 3 seed and world No. 110, Lourdes Dominguez-Lino, and advanced to the final round of qualifying. In March/April, Glatch continued her post-injury, rapid rise up the rankings by winning the $25k Iripuato Mexico and the $50k Osprey Florida event (as a wildcard) defeating top seeded world No. 44, Madison Brengle, in the final. She continued her good form by qualifying for the 2015 French Open, and subsequently added a tenth ITF Circuit title by winning the $25k Gatineau event in Canada without dropping a set.

The ITIA listed her as a retired player on 31 May 2024.

== Grand Slam singles performance timeline ==
Key
W	F	SF	QF	#R	RR	Q#	DNQ	A	NH

(W) winner; (F) finalist; (SF) semifinalist; (QF) quarterfinalist; (#R) rounds 4, 3, 2, 1; (RR) round-robin stage; (Q#) qualification round; (DNQ) did not qualify; (A) absent; (NH) not held; (SR) strike rate (events won / competed); (W–L) win–loss record.
To avoid confusion and double counting, these charts are updated at the conclusion of a tournament or when the player's participation has ended.

Tournament	2004	2005	2006	2007	2008	2009	2010	2011	2012	2013	2014	2015	2016	2017	2018	2019	2020	2021	W–L
Australian Open	A	A	A	A	A	Q1	A	A	A	Q1	A	Q3	Q1	A	A	A	A	A	0–0
French Open	A	A	A	A	A	2R	Q1	A	2R	A	A	1R	A	Q1	A	A	A	A	2–3
Wimbledon	A	A	A	A	A	1R	A	1R	Q3	1R	A	Q1	A	A	A	A	A	A	0–3
US Open	Q2	2R	1R	1R	1R	1R	Q1	Q1	Q3	A	A	Q1	A	Q2	A	A	A	A	1–5
Year-end ranking	362	225	541	266	165	136	301	151	119	404	639	137	803	574	581	322	291	298	3–11

== Personal life ==
Alexa graduated from Laurel Springs High School. She was accepted to UCLA but opted not to attend. Some of her favorite tennis players include Steffi Graf and Roger Federer. After many years with Nike and time with ASICS, she now endorses Roche sportswear, Babolat rackets, and SOS Rehydrate sports drinks.

== ITF Circuit finals ==
Legend
$100,000 tournaments
$75/80,000 tournaments
$50,000 tournaments
$25,000 tournaments
$10,000 tournaments

=== Singles: 17 (10 titles, 7 runner–ups) ===
Result	W–L	Date	Tournament	Tier	Surface	Opponent	Score
Loss	0–1	Jun 2004	ITF Hamilton, Canada	25,000	Clay	(Canada) Stéphanie Dubois	1–6, 5–7
Win	1–1	Jun 2006	ITF Fort Worth, United States	10,000	Hard	(United States) Jamie Hampton	6–4, 6–1
Loss	1–2	Jun 2006	ITF Edmond, United States	10,000	Hard	(United States) Riza Zalameda	4–6, 1–6
Win	2–2	Jul 2007	ITF Southlake, US	25,000	Hard	(United States) Sunitha Rao	6–2, 7–5
Loss	2–3	May 2008	Carson Challenger, US	50,000	Hard	(United States) Mashona Washington	5–7, 4–6
Win	3–3	Oct 2008	Toronto Challenger, Canada	50,000	Hard (i)	(Canada) Stéphanie Dubois	6–4, 6–3
Win	4–3	Oct 2008	Challenger de Saguenay, Canada	50,000	Hard (i)	(Italy) Alberta Brianti	6–3, 6–1
Win	5–3	Jan 2009	ITF Laguna Niguel, US	25,000	Hard	(South Africa) Chanelle Scheepers	6–1, 6–0
Loss	5–4	May 2011	Carson Challenger, US	50,000	Hard	(Italy) Camila Giorgi	6–7^{(4)}, 1–6
Loss	5–5	Oct 2011	Las Vegas Open, US	50,000	Hard	(Switzerland) Romina Oprandi	7–6^{(2)}, 3–6, 6–7^{(4)}
Win	6–5	Oct 2012	ITF Makinohara, Japan	25,000	Grass	(Australia) Monique Adamczak	6–3, 6–4
Win	7–5	Oct 2012	ITF Hamamatsu, Japan	25,000	Grass	(Australia) Monique Adamczak	6–2, 6–3
Win	8–5	Mar 2015	ITF Irapuato, Mexico	25,000	Hard	(Czech Republic) Renata Voráčová	6–2, 7–5
Win	9–5	Apr 2015	Osprey Challenger, US	50,000	Clay	(United States) Madison Brengle	6–3, 6–7, 6–2
Win	10–5	Jul 2015	ITF Gatineau, Canada	25,000	Hard	(Canada) Bianca Andreescu	6–4, 6–3
Loss	10–6	Jun 2019	ITF Denver, US	25,000	Hard	(United States) Usue Maitane Arconada	4–6, 6–2, 3–6
Loss	10–7	Nov 2019	Pro Challenge Tyler, US	80,000	Hard	(Luxembourg) Mandy Minella	4–6, 4–6

=== Doubles: 13 (9 titles, 4 runner–ups) ===
Result	W–L	Date	Tournament	Tier	Surface	Partner	Opponents	Score
Win	1–0	Jun 2006	ITF Edmond, US	10,000	Hard	(United States) Ashley Weinhold	(United States) Elizabeth Kaufman (United States) Lindsey Nelson	6–4, 6–4
Win	2–0	Nov 2008	ITF San Diego, US	50,000	Hard	(United States) Christina Fusano	(United States) Angela Haynes (United States) Mashona Washington	6–3, 6–2
Win	3–0	Jun 2009	Nottingham Trophy, UK	75,000	Grass	(South Africa) Natalie Grandin	(Greece) Eleni Daniilidou (Japan) Rika Fujiwara	6–3, 2–6, [10–7]
Win	4–0	Apr 2011	ITF Osprey, US	25,000	Clay	(France) Stéphanie Foretz	(Argentina) María Irigoyen (Japan) Erika Sema	4–6, 7–5, [10–7]
Loss	4–1	May 2011	ITF Indian Harbour Beach, US	50,000	Clay	(United States) Christina Fusano	(Ukraine) Alyona Sotnikova (Slovakia) Lenka Wienerová	4–6, 3–6
Win	5–1	Sep 2011	ITF Albuquerque, US	75,000	Hard	(United States) Asia Muhammad	(United States) Grace Min (United States) Melanie Oudin	4–6, 6–3, [10–2]
Win	6–1	Oct 2011	Las Vegas Open, US	50,000	Hard	(United States) Mashona Washington	(United States) Varvara Lepchenko (United States) Melanie Oudin	6–4, 6–2
Loss	6–2	Oct 2012	ITF Hamamatsu, Japan	25,000	Grass	(Australia) Monique Adamczak	(Japan) Shuko Aoyama (Japan) Miki Miyamura	6–3, 4–6, [6–10]
Win	7–2	Oct 2014	Classic of Macon, US	50,000	Hard	(United States) Madison Brengle	(United States) Anna Tatishvili (United States) Ashley Weinhold	6–0, 7–5
Loss	7–3	Nov 2014	John Newcombe Challenge, US	50,000	Hard	(United States) Bernarda Pera	(Colombia) Mariana Duque (Paraguay) Verónica Cepede Royg	0–6, 3–6
Win	8–3	Aug 2021	Landisville Challenge, US	100,000	Hard	(United States) Hanna Chang	(United Kingdom) Samantha Murray Sharan (Russia) Valeria Savinykh	7–6^{(3)}, 3–6, [11–9]
Loss	8–4	Oct 2022	ITF Redding, US	25,000	Hard	(Indonesia) Aldila Sutjiadi	(United States) Rasheeda McAdoo (Ukraine) Hanna Poznikhirenko	6–7^{(3)}, 5–7
Win	9–4	May 2023	ITF Bethany Beach, US	25,000	Clay	(Ukraine) Hanna Poznikhirenko	(United States) Victoria Osuigwe (South Africa) Gabriella Broadfoot	7–5, 7–5
