= The Oaks Club Challenger =

ITF Women's Tour
- Event name: Osprey
- Location: Osprey, Florida, United States
- Venue: The Oaks Club
- Category: ITF $25,000
- Surface: Clay
- Draw: 32S/32Q/16D
- Prize money: $25,000
- Website: www.theoaksclub.com

The Oaks Club Challenger (previously known as Wilde Lexus Women's USTA Pro Circuit Event) is a tournament for professional female tennis players played on outdoor clay courts. The event is classified as a $25,000 ITF Women's Circuit tournament and has been held in Osprey, Florida, United States, since 2009.

== Past finals ==
=== Singles ===
| Year | Champion | Runner-up | Score |
|---|---|---|---|
| 2020 | Tournament cancelled due to the COVID-19 pandemic | | |
| 2019 | (United States) Ann Li | (United States) Usue Maitane Arconada | 6–3, 7–5 |
| 2018 | (Israel) Deniz Khazaniuk | (United States) Sophie Chang | 6–4, 4–6, [10–6] |
| 2017 | Not held | | |
| 2016 | (United States) Madison Brengle | (Spain) Lara Arruabarrena | 4–6, 6–4, 6–3 |
| 2015 | (United States) Alexa Glatch | (United States) Madison Brengle | 6–2, 6–7^{(6–8)}, 6–3 |
| 2014 | (Slovakia) Anna Karolína Schmiedlová | (New Zealand) Marina Erakovic | 6–2, 6–3 |
| 2013 | (Colombia) Mariana Duque Mariño | (Spain) Estrella Cabeza Candela | 7–6^{(7–2)}, 6–1 |
| 2012 | (Netherlands) Arantxa Rus | (Kazakhstan) Sesil Karatantcheva | 6–4, 6–1 |
| 2011 | (France) Claire de Gubernatis | (France) Caroline Garcia | 6–4, 6–4 |
| 2010 | (United States) Jamie Hampton | (Argentina) Florencia Molinero | 6−1, 6−3 |
| 2009 | (Canada) Sharon Fichman | (Ukraine) Yuliana Fedak | 6–4, 6–1 |

=== Doubles ===
| Year | Champions | Runners-up | Score |
|---|---|---|---|
| 2020 | Tournament cancelled due to the COVID-19 pandemic | | |
| 2019 | (United States) Pamela Montez (Australia) Belinda Woolcock | (Netherlands) Arianne Hartono (Moldova) Alexandra Perper | 7–6^{(8–6)}, 6–3 |
| 2018 | Doubles competition abandoned due to bad weather | | |
| 2017 | Not held | | |
| 2016 | (United States) Asia Muhammad (United States) Taylor Townsend | (United States) Louisa Chirico (United States) Katerina Stewart | 6–1, 6–7^{(5–7)}, [10–4] |
| 2015 | (Ukraine) Anhelina Kalinina (Ukraine) Oleksandra Korashvili | (Paraguay) Verónica Cepede Royg (Argentina) María Irigoyen | 6–1, 6–4 |
| 2014 | (Japan) Rika Fujiwara (Chinese Taipei) Hsieh Shu-ying | (United States) Irina Falconi (Czech Republic) Eva Hrdinová | 6–3, 6–7^{(5–7)}, [10–4] |
| 2013 | (United States) Raquel Kops-Jones (United States) Abigail Spears | (Paraguay) Verónica Cepede Royg (Spain) Inés Ferrer Suárez | 6–1, 6–3 |
| 2012 | (United States) Lindsay Lee-Waters (United States) Megan Moulton-Levy | (Russia) Alexandra Panova (Ukraine) Lesia Tsurenko | 2–6, 6–4, [10–7] |
| 2011 | (France) Stéphanie Foretz (United States) Alexa Glatch | (Argentina) María Irigoyen (Japan) Erika Sema | 4–6, 7–5, [10–7] |
| 2010 | (Argentina) María Irigoyen (Argentina) Florencia Molinero | (United States) Madison Brengle (United States) Asia Muhammad | 6–1, 7–6^{(7–3)} |
| 2009 | (United States) Lindsay Lee-Waters (United States) Story Tweedie-Yates | (Canada) Heidi El Tabakh (Austria) Melanie Klaffner | 6–3, 6–7^{(5–7)}, [12–10] |
