= Kateřina Kramperová =

Czech tennis player

- Country (sports): Czech Republic
- Born: 28 December 1988 (age 37) Prague, Czechoslovakia
- Height: 1.61 m (5 ft 3 in)
- Retired: 2019
- Plays: Right (two-handed backhand)
- Prize money: $104,730

Singles
- Career record: 332–261
- Career titles: 5 ITF
- Highest ranking: No. 314 (29 April 2013)

Grand Slam singles results
- Australian Open Junior: 2R (2006)
- French Open Junior: 1R (2004, 2005)
- Wimbledon Junior: 3R (2005, 2006)
- US Open Junior: 2R (2005)

Doubles
- Career record: 178–175
- Career titles: 8 ITF
- Highest ranking: No. 208 (11 July 2016)

Grand Slam doubles results
- Australian Open Junior: 2R (2006)
- French Open Junior: 2R (2004)
- Wimbledon Junior: 2R (2005, 2006)
- US Open Junior: SF (2006)

Kateřina Kramperová (born 28 December 1988) is a Czech former tennis player.

Kramperová won five singles and eight doubles titles on the ITF Circuit. On 29 April 2013, she reached her best singles ranking of world No. 314. On 11 July 2016, she peaked at No. 208 in the WTA doubles rankings.

Partnering Bernarda Pera, Kramperová won her first $75k tournament in August 2015 at the Prague Open, defeating Miriam Kolodziejová and Markéta Vondroušová in the final.

In July 2019, Kramperová announced her retirement from professional tennis.

== ITF Circuit finals ==
$100,000 tournaments
$75,000 tournaments
$50,000 tournaments
$25,000 tournaments
$10,000 tournaments

=== Singles: 17 (5 titles, 12 runner-ups) ===
Result	No.	Date	Tournament	Surface	Opponent	Score
Loss	1.	Feb 2006	ITF Wellington, New Zealand	Hard	(New Zealand) Leanne Baker	4–6, 6–1, 0–6
Winner	1.	Jan 2007	ITF Hull, England	Hard (i)	(Russia) Anastasia Poltoratskaya	7–6^{(4)}, 6–3
Loss	2.	Aug 2008	ITF Prague, Czech Republic	Clay	(Czech Republic) Lucie Kriegsmannová	5–7, 2–6
Win	2.	Nov 2008	ITF Córdoba, Mexico	Hard	(United States) Chloe Jones	6–0, 6–7^{(4)}, 6–2
Win	3.	May 2011	ITF Durban, South Africa	Hard	(South Africa) Surina De Beer	6–2, 6–0
Loss	3.	May 2011	ITF Durban, South Africa	Hard	(Austria) Nicole Rottmann	7–6^{(4)}, 5–7, 1–6
Win	4.	Oct 2011	ITF Montego Bay, Jamaica	Hard	(Slovakia) Zuzana Zlochová	7–6^{(5)}, 2–6, 6–1
Loss	4.	Nov 2011	ITF Montego Bay, Jamaica	Hard	(United States) Chalena Scholl	2–6, 2–6
Loss	5.	Jun 2012	ITF Jablonec nad Nisou, Czech Republic	Clay	(Czech Republic) Klára Fabíková	4–6, 1–6
Loss	6.	Aug 2012	ITF Piešťany, Slovakia	Clay	(Czech Republic) Kateřina Vaňková	6–3, 3–6, 2–6
Loss	7.	Aug 2012	ITF Osijek, Croatia	Clay	(Croatia) Iva Mekovec	1–6, 2–6
Loss	8.	Mar 2013	ITF Gainesville, United States	Clay	(United States) Allie Kiick	5–7, 1–6
Loss	9.	Aug 2013	ITF Vienna, Austria	Clay	(Slovakia) Petra Uberalová	6–4, 2–6, 2–6
Loss	10.	Sep 2013	ITF Antalya, Turkey	Hard	(Slovakia) Chantal Škamlová	5–7, 3–6
Win	5.	Mar 2014	ITF Gainesville, United States	Clay	(United States) Katerina Stewart	6–3, 6–2
Loss	11.	Sep 2014	ITF Antalya, Turkey	Hard	(France) Clothilde de Bernardi	2–6, 3–6
Loss	12.	Oct 2014	ITF Antalya, Turkey	Hard	(Liechtenstein) Kathinka von Deichmann	2–6, 7–6^{(6)}, 4–6

=== Doubles: 28 (8 titles, 20 runner-ups) ===
Result	No.	Date	Tournament	Surface	Partnering	Opponents	Score
Loss	1.	16 June 2008	ITF Davos, Switzerland	Clay	(Austria) Janina Toljan	(Hungary) Katalin Marosi (Brazil) Marina Tavares	7–5, 4–6, [7–10]
Loss	2.	10 November 2008	ITF Santiago, Chile	Clay	(United States) Nataly Yoo	(Colombia) Karen Castiblanco (Chile) Andrea Koch-Benvenuto	w/o
Win	1.	29 March 2009	ITF Metepec, Mexico	Hard	(Slovakia) Dominika Diešková	(Brazil) Maria Fernanda Alves (United States) Jennifer Elie	6–1, 7–6^{(5)}
Loss	3.	24 May 2010	ITF Velenje, Slovenia	Clay	(Czech Republic) Pavla Šmídová	(Australia) Alenka Hubacek (Australia) Tammi Patterson	1–6, 6–3, 4–6
Win	2.	23 May 2011	ITF Durban, South Africa	Hard	(Czech Republic) Zuzana Linhová	(Denmark) Malou Ejdesgaard (Austria) Nicole Rottmann	6–3, 3–6, 6–4
Win	3.	30 May 2011	ITF Přerov, Czech Republic	Clay	(Czech Republic) Karolína Plíšková	(Ukraine) Lyudmyla Kichenok (Ukraine) Nadiya Kichenok	6–3, 6–4
Loss	4.	29 August 2011	ITF Trimbach, Switzerland	Clay	(Australia) Marisa Gianotti	(Switzerland) Xenia Knoll (Germany) Christina Shakovets	3–6, 6–7^{(5)}
Loss	5.	17 October 2011	ITF Montego Bay, Jamaica	Hard	(United Kingdom) Nicola George	(Czech Republic) Nikola Hübnerová (Slovakia) Zuzana Zlochová	4–6, 4–6
Loss	6.	31 October 2011	ITF Montego Bay, Jamaica	Hard	(Italy) Federica Grazioso	(United States) Chalena Scholl (Slovakia) Zuzana Zlochová	2–6, 2–6
Win	4.	2 July 2012	Bella Cup, Poland	Clay	(Czech Republic) Martina Kubičíková	(Poland) Katarzyna Piter (Poland) Barbara Sobaszkiewicz	1–6, 6–3, [10–4]
Loss	7.	27 August 2012	ITF Osijek, Croatia	Clay	(Czech Republic) Petra Krejsová	(Czech Republic) Aneta Dvořáková (Czech Republic) Barbora Krejčíková	4–6, 6–3, [8–10]
Loss	8.	24 September 2012	ITF Prague, Czech Republic	Clay	(Poland) Magda Linette	(United Kingdom) Lucy Brown (Italy) Angelica Moratelli	3–6, 7–5, [6–10]
Loss	9.	11 March 2013	ITF Orlando, United States	Clay	(Ukraine) Tetyana Arefyeva	(Czech Republic) Nikola Fraňková (Brazil) Nathalia Rossi	5–7, 6–2, [8–10]
Win	5.	9 September 2013	ITF Antalya, Turkey	Hard	(Germany) Michaela Frlicka	(Slovakia) Chantal Škamlová (Austria) Marlies Szupper	6–3, 7–6^{(4)}
Win	6.	3 March 2014	ITF Gainesville, United States	Clay	(Czech Republic) Nikola Fraňková	(United States) Roxanne Ellison (United States) Sierra Ellison	6–4, 6–3
Loss	10.	9 June 2014	ITF Budapest, Hungary	Clay	(Slovenia) Dalila Jakupović	(Hungary) Réka Luca Jani (Russia) Irina Khromacheva	5–7, 4–6
Loss	11.	6 October 2014	ITF Antalya, Turkey	Hard	(Romania) Daiana Negreanu	(China) Ye Qiuyu (China) You Xiaodi	6–7^{(3)}, 7–5, [6–10]
Loss	12.	22 March 2015	ITF Orlando, United States	Clay	(United States) Katerina Stewart	(United States) Ingrid Neel (Hungary) Fanny Stollár	3–6, 6–7^{(4)}
Loss	13.	11 April 2015	ITF Jackson, United States	Clay	(Australia) Jessica Moore	(United States) Alexa Guarachi (United States) Caitlin Whoriskey	7–6^{(4)}, 3–6, [9–11]
Win	7.	10 August 2015	ITF Prague Open, Czech Republic	Clay	(United States) Bernarda Pera	(Czech Republic) Miriam Kolodziejová (Czech Republic) Markéta Vondroušová	7–6^{(4)}, 5–7, [10–1]
Loss	14.	13 September 2015	ITF Sofia, Bulgaria	Clay	(Bulgaria) Elitsa Kostova	(Georgia (country)) Sofia Shapatava (Ukraine) Anastasiya Vasylyeva	2–6, 2–6
Loss	15.	18 September 2015	ITF Dobrich, Bulgaria	Clay	(Bulgaria) Elitsa Kostova	(Georgia (country)) Sofia Shapatava (Ukraine) Anastasiya Vasylyeva	2–6, 0–6
Loss	16.	31 January 2016	ITF Sunrise, United States	Clay	(Czech Republic) Jesika Malečková	(Czech Republic) Lenka Kunčíková (Czech Republic) Karolína Stuchlá	1–6, 6–7^{(6)}
Loss	17.	19 February 2016	Morelos Open, Mexico	Hard	(Ukraine) Elizaveta Ianchuk	(Bulgaria) Aleksandrina Naydenova (Hungary) Fanny Stollár	3–6, 2–6
Win	8.	29 August 2016	ITF Mamaia, Romania	Clay	(Slovakia) Vivien Juhászová	(Romania) Irina Bara (Romania) Mihaela Buzărnescu	7–6^{(3)}, 2–6, [10–7]
Loss	18.	26 September 2016	ITF Sozopol, Bulgaria	Hard	(Russia) Angelina Zhuravleva	(Bulgaria) Petia Arshinkova (Serbia) Dejana Radanović	1–6, 3–6
Loss	19.	3 October 2016	ITF Sozopol, Bulgaria	Hard	(Russia) Angelina Zhuravleva	(Romania) Oana Gavrilă (Romania) Andreea Roșca	4–6, 3–6
Loss	20.	22 April 2017	Chiasso Open, Switzerland	Clay	(Netherlands) Rosalie van der Hoek	(North Macedonia) Lina Gjorcheska (Bulgaria) Aleksandrina Naydenova	5–7, 6–2, [7–10]
