= 2018 Red Rock Pro Open =

- Date: 5–11 November
- Edition: 10th
- Category: ITF Women's Circuit
- Prize money: $80,000
- Surface: Hard
- Location: Las Vegas, United States

Champions

Singles
- (Switzerland) Belinda Bencic

Doubles
- (United States) Asia Muhammad / (United States) Maria Sanchez
← 2017 ·	Red Rock Pro Open	· 2019 →

The 2018 Red Rock Pro Open was a professional tennis tournament played on outdoor hard courts. It was the tenth edition of the tournament and was part of the 2018 ITF Women's Circuit. It took place in Las Vegas, United States, on 5–11 November 2018.

== Singles main draw entrants ==
=== Seeds ===
Country	Player	Rank^{1}	Seed
SUI	Belinda Bencic	39	1
GBR	Heather Watson	99	2
HUN	Fanny Stollár	128	3
USA	Varvara Lepchenko	130	4
RUS	Sofya Zhuk	133	5
CZE	Marie Bouzková	142	6
PAR	Verónica Cepede Royg	145	7
USA	Nicole Gibbs	146	8

- ^{1} Rankings as of 29 October 2018.

=== Other entrants ===
The following players received a wildcard into the singles main draw:

- (United States) Louisa Chirico
- (United States) Kayla Day
- (United States) Maria Mateas

The following player received entry using a protected ranking:

- (United States) Elizabeth Halbauer
- (Argentina) Nadia Podoroska

The following players received entry from the qualifying draw:

- (United States) Hanna Chang
- (United States) Jennifer Elie
- (Mexico) Giuliana Olmos
- (United States) Maria Sanchez

== Champions ==
=== Singles ===
- (Switzerland) Belinda Bencic def. (United States) Nicole Gibbs, 7–5, 6–1

=== Doubles ===
- (United States) Asia Muhammad / (United States) Maria Sanchez def. (United States) Sophie Chang / (United States) Alexandra Mueller, 6–3, 6–4
