= 2017 Red Rock Pro Open =

- Date: 11–17 September
- Edition: 9th
- Category: ITF Women's Circuit
- Prize money: $60,000
- Surface: Hard
- Location: Las Vegas, United States

Champions

Singles
- (Bulgaria) Sesil Karatantcheva

Doubles
- (Belgium) An-Sophie Mestach / (United Kingdom) Laura Robson
← 2016 ·	Red Rock Pro Open	· 2018 →

The 2017 Red Rock Pro Open was a professional tennis tournament played on outdoor hard courts. It was the ninth edition of the tournament and was part of the 2017 ITF Women's Circuit. It took place in Las Vegas, United States, on 11–17 September 2017.

== Singles main draw entrants ==
=== Seeds ===
Country	Player	Rank^{1}	Seed
USA	Louisa Chirico	152	1
AUT	Barbara Haas	153	2
CZE	Marie Bouzková	172	3
SVK	Anna Karolína Schmiedlová	175	4
SRB	Ivana Jorović	180	5
GBR	Laura Robson	210	6
BUL	Sesil Karatantcheva	226	7
BUL	Elitsa Kostova	231	8

- ^{1} Rankings as of 28 August 2017.

=== Other entrants ===
The following player received a wildcard into the singles main draw:

- (Australia) Laura Ashley

The following player received entry using a protected ranking:

- (United States) Allie Kiick

The following players received entry from the qualifying draw:

- (Russia) Elena Bovina
- (United States) Nicole Coopersmith
- (United States) Sanaz Marand
- (United States) Maria Mateas

== Champions ==
=== Singles ===
- (Bulgaria) Sesil Karatantcheva def. (Bulgaria) Elitsa Kostova, 6–4, 4–6, 7–5

=== Doubles ===
- (Belgium) An-Sophie Mestach / (United Kingdom) Laura Robson def. (United States) Sophie Chang / (United States) Alexandra Mueller, 7–6^{(9–7)}, 7–6^{(7–2)}
