= 2019 Henderson Tennis Open =

- Date: 4–10 November 2019
- Edition: 11th
- Category: ITF Women's World Tennis Tour
- Prize money: $60,000
- Surface: Hard
- Location: Las Vegas, United States

Champions

Singles
- (Japan) Mayo Hibi

Doubles
- (Belarus) Olga Govortsova / (Luxembourg) Mandy Minella
← 2018 ·	Henderson Tennis Open	· 2021 →

The 2019 Henderson Tennis Open was a professional tennis tournament played on outdoor hard courts. It was the eleventh edition of the tournament which was part of the 2019 ITF Women's World Tennis Tour. It took place in Las Vegas, United States between 4 and 10 November 2019.

== Singles main-draw entrants ==
=== Seeds ===
Country	Player	Rank^{1}	Seed
BEL	Kirsten Flipkens	99	1
ROU	Patricia Maria Țig	115	2
UKR	Katarina Zavatska	117	3
SUI	Stefanie Vögele	123	4
USA	Varvara Lepchenko	135	5
USA	Ann Li	147	6
USA	Sachia Vickery	160	7
USA	Caroline Dolehide	166	8

- ^{1} Rankings are as of 21 October 2019.

=== Other entrants ===
The following players received wildcards into the singles main draw:

- (United States) Jamie Loeb
- (United States) Grace Min
- (United States) Katerina Stewart
- (Hungary) Fanny Stollár

The following player received a special exempt into the singles main draw:

- (United States) Alexa Glatch

The following players received entry from the qualifying draw:

- (Montenegro) Vladica Babić
- (United States) Charlotte Chavatipon
- (United States) Quinn Gleason
- (Spain) María Gutiérrez Carrasco
- (United States) Alycia Parks
- (United States) Natasha Subhash
- (Germany) Stephanie Wagner
- (Mexico) Marcela Zacarías

The following player received entry as a lucky loser:

- (Mexico) Giuliana Olmos

== Champions ==
=== Singles ===
- (Japan) Mayo Hibi def. (Ukraine) Anhelina Kalinina, 6–2, 5–7, 6–2

=== Doubles ===
- (Belarus) Olga Govortsova / (Luxembourg) Mandy Minella def. (United States) Sophie Chang / (United States) Alexandra Mueller, 6–3, 6–4
