= 2016 Kentucky Bank Tennis Championships =

- Date: 25–31 July
- Edition: 21st (men); 19th (women)
- Category: ATP Challenger Tour; ITF Women's Circuit
- Prize money: $50,000 (men) $50,000 (women)
- Surface: Hard
- Location: Lexington, Kentucky, United States

Champions

Men's singles
- (United States) Ernesto Escobedo

Women's singles
- (Netherlands) Michaëlla Krajicek

Men's doubles
- (Australia) Luke Saville / (Australia) Jordan Thompson

Women's doubles
- (Japan) Hiroko Kuwata / (China) Zhu Lin
- Kentucky Bank Tennis Championships

The 2016 Kentucky Bank Tennis Championships was a professional tennis tournament played on outdoor hard courts. It was the 21st edition, for men, and 19th edition, for women, of the tournament and part of the 2016 ATP Challenger Tour and the 2016 ITF Women's Circuit, offering totals of $50,000, for both genders, in prize money. It took place in Lexington, Kentucky, United States, on 25–31 July 2016.

== Men's singles main draw entrants ==
=== Seeds ===
Country	Player	Rank^{1}	Seed
FRA	Adrian Mannarino	55	1
TUN	Malek Jaziri	63	2
GBR	Daniel Evans	82	3
AUS	Jordan Thompson	90	4
USA	Bjorn Fratangelo	108	5
FRA	Quentin Halys	140	6
USA	Frances Tiafoe	156	7
USA	Stefan Kozlov	163	8

- ^{1} Rankings as of 18 July 2016.

=== Other entrants ===
The following players received a wildcard into the singles main draw:

- (United States) Brian Baker
- (United States) Eric Quigley
- (United States) Ryan Shane
- (United States) William Bushamuka

The following player entered as an alternate:

- (Argentina) Juan Ignacio Londero

The following players received entry from the qualifying draw:

- (United Kingdom) Lloyd Glasspool
- (United States) Alex Kuznetsov
- (United States) Mackenzie McDonald
- (United States) Jesse Witten

== Women's singles main draw entrants ==
=== Seeds ===
Country	Player	Rank^{1}	Seed
BEL	Alison Van Uytvanck	116	1
CZE	~~Kristýna Plíšková~~	~~119~~	2
ROU	~~Ana Bogdan~~	~~135~~	3
USA	Taylor Townsend	148	4
JPN	Hiroko Kuwata	154	5
CHN	Zhu Lin	151	6
USA	Grace Min	158	7
JPN	Miyu Kato	182	8
BEL	An-Sophie Mestach	189	9

- ^{1} Rankings as of 18 July 2016.

=== Other entrants ===
The following players received a wildcard into the singles main draw:

- (United States) Francesca Di Lorenzo
- (United States) Raveena Kingsley
- (United States) Jamie Loeb
- (United States) Melanie Oudin

The following players received entry from the qualifying draw:

- (Australia) Alison Bai
- (Italy) Cristiana Ferrando
- (Belgium) Greet Minnen
- (Australia) Olivia Rogowska

The following players received entry as lucky losers:

- (United Kingdom) Katy Dunne
- (United Kingdom) Laura Robson
- (United Kingdom) Emily Webley-Smith

== Champions ==
=== Men's singles ===
- (United States) Ernesto Escobedo def. (United States) Frances Tiafoe, 6–2, 6–7^{(6–8)}, 7–6^{(7–3)}

=== Women's singles ===
- (Netherlands) Michaëlla Krajicek def. (Australia) Arina Rodionova, 6–0, 2–6, 6–2

=== Men's doubles ===
- (Australia) Luke Saville / (Australia) Jordan Thompson def. (South Africa) Nicolaas Scholtz / (South Africa) Tucker Vorster, 6–2, 7–5

=== Women's doubles ===
- (Japan) Hiroko Kuwata / (China) Zhu Lin def. (United States) Sophie Chang / (United States) Alexandra Mueller, 6–0, 7–5
