= 2021 Henderson Tennis Open =

Tennis tournament

- Date: 4–10 October 2021
- Edition: 12th
- Category: ITF Women's World Tennis Tour
- Prize money: $60,000
- Surface: Hard
- Location: Henderson, Las Vegas, United States

Champions

Singles
- (United States) Emina Bektas

Doubles
- (United States) Quinn Gleason / (Slovakia) Tereza Mihalíková
← 2019 ·	Henderson Tennis Open	· 2022 →

The 2021 Henderson Tennis Open was a professional women's tennis tournament played on outdoor hard courts. It was the twelfth edition of the tournament which was part of the 2021 ITF Women's World Tennis Tour. It took place in Henderson, Las Vegas, United States between 4 and 10 October 2021.

== Singles main-draw entrants ==
=== Seeds ===
Country	Player	Rank^{1}	Seed
SUI	Conny Perrin	225	1
USA	Allie Kiick	250	2
JPN	Yuriko Lily Miyazaki	252	3
USA	Hanna Chang	262	4
USA	Alexa Glatch	271	5
USA	Emina Bektas	331	6
SUI	Lulu Sun	352	7
JPN	Nagi Hanatani	376	8

- ^{1} Rankings are as of 27 September 2021.

=== Other entrants ===
The following players received wildcards into the singles main draw:

- (United States) Haley Giavara
- (United States) Rasheeda McAdoo
- (United States) Shatoo Mohamad
- (United States) Alexandra Riley

The following players received entry using protected rankings:

- (United States) Louisa Chirico
- (Japan) Hiroko Kuwata

The following players received entry from the qualifying draw:

- (Israel) Shir Azran
- (United States) Ibifuro Clement
- (Sweden) Molly Helgesson
- (United States) Tricia Mar
- (United States) Rhiann Newborn
- (United States) Erica Oosterhout
- (United States) Holly Verner
- (Mexico) Marcela Zacarías

== Champions ==
=== Singles ===
- (United States) Emina Bektas def. (Japan) Yuriko Lily Miyazaki, 6–1, 6–1

=== Doubles ===
- (United States) Quinn Gleason / (Slovakia) Tereza Mihalíková def. (United States) Emina Bektas / (United Kingdom) Tara Moore, 7–6^{(7–5)}, 7–5
