= 2016 Red Rock Pro Open =

- Date: 26 September–2 October
- Edition: 8th
- Category: ITF Women's Circuit
- Prize money: $50,000
- Surface: Hard
- Location: Las Vegas, United States

Champions

Singles
- (Belgium) Alison Van Uytvanck

Doubles
- (Netherlands) Michaëlla Krajicek / (United States) Maria Sanchez
← 2015 ·	Red Rock Pro Open	· 2017 →

The 2016 Red Rock Pro Open was a professional tennis tournament played on outdoor hard courts. It was the 8th edition of the tournament and part of the 2016 ITF Women's Circuit, offering a total of $50,000 in prize money. It took place in Las Vegas, United States, on 26 September–2 October 2016.

== Singles main draw entrants ==
=== Seeds ===
Country	Player	Rank^{1}	Seed
BEL	Alison Van Uytvanck	103	1
LUX	Mandy Minella	112	2
USA	Julia Boserup	116	3
BEL	Elise Mertens	122	4
PAR	Verónica Cepede Royg	127	5
USA	Taylor Townsend	142	6
PAR	Montserrat González	151	7
USA	Sachia Vickery	154	8

- ^{1} Rankings as of 19 September 2016.

=== Other entrants ===
The following player received a wildcard into the singles main draw:

- (United States) Sophie Chang
- (United States) Sofia Kenin
- (United States) Melanie Oudin
- (United States) Maria Sanchez

The following players received entry from the qualifying draw:

- (Czech Republic) Marie Bouzková
- (United States) Julia Elbaba
- (Hungary) Fanny Stollár
- (Germany) Anna Zaja

The following player received entry by a lucky loser spot:

- (United States) Kayla Day

== Champions ==
=== Singles ===
- (Belgium) Alison Van Uytvanck def. (United States) Sofia Kenin, 3–6, 7–6^{(7–4)}, 6–2

=== Doubles ===
- (Netherlands) Michaëlla Krajicek / (United States) Maria Sanchez def. (United States) Jamie Loeb / (South Africa) Chanel Simmonds, 7–5, 6–1
