= 2022 Henderson Tennis Open – Singles =

Singles
- 2022 Henderson Tennis Open

Final
- Champion: (China) Yuan Yue
- Runner-up: Diana Shnaider
- Score: 4–6, 6–3, 6–1

Events
| Singles | Doubles |
| ← 2021 · | Henderson Tennis Open | · 2023 → |

Emina Bektas was the defending champion but chose not to participate.

Yuan Yue won the title, defeating Diana Shnaider in the final, 4–6, 6–3, 6–1.

== Seeds ==
1. (Hungary) Panna Udvardy (second round)
2. (China) Yuan Yue (champion)
3. (Sweden) Rebecca Peterson (semifinals)
4. (United States) Katie Volynets (quarterfinals)
5. (United States) Asia Muhammad (first round)
6. (United States) Katrina Scott (first round)
7. (Australia) Astra Sharma (quarterfinals)
8. (Argentina) Nadia Podoroska (first round)

== Draw ==
=== Key ===
- Q = Qualifier
- WC = Wild card
- LL = Lucky loser
- Alt = Alternate
- SE = Special exempt
- PR = Protected ranking
- ITF = ITF entry
- JE = Junior exempt
- w/o = Walkover
- r = Retired
- d = Defaulted
- SR = Special ranking

=== Finals ===
Semifinals
Diana Shnaider | 2 | 7 | 6
(Mexico) Marcela Zacarías | 6 | 5 | 1
3 | (Sweden) Rebecca Peterson | 3 | 6^{4}
2 | (China) Yuan Yue | 6 | 7^{7}

Final
Diana Shnaider | 6 | 3 | 1
2 | (China) Yuan Yue | 4 | 6 | 6

=== Top half ===
First round
1 | (Hungary) P Udvardy | 6 | 6
WC | (United States) R Kingsley | 4 | 4
D Shnaider | 6 | 6
Q | (Chinese Taipei) C-y Hsu | 4 | 0
Q | (United States) S Colling | 6 | 6
(Japan) Y Naito | 3 | 4
(Hong Kong) E Chong | 7 | 6
5 | (United States) A Muhammad | 5 | 2
4 | (United States) K Volynets | 6 | 4 | 6
WC | (United States) R McAdoo | 3 | 6 | 2
(United States) A Glatch | 6 | 6
Q | (United States) C Corley | 3 | 4
Q | V Miroshnichenko | 6 | 2 | 2
(United States) A Reami | 2 | 6 | 6
(Mexico) M Zacarías | 6 | 7^{7}
6 | (United States) K Scott | 2 | 6^{5}

Second round
1 | (Hungary) P Udvardy | 4 | 4
D Shnaider | 6 | 6
Q | (United States) S Colling | 5 | 0
(Hong Kong) E Chong | 7 | 6
4 | (United States) K Volynets | 3 | 6 | 7^{10}
(United States) A Glatch | 6 | 3 | 6^{8}
(United States) A Reami | 1 | 4
(Mexico) M Zacarías | 6 | 6

Quarterfinals
D Shnaider | 6 | 7
(Hong Kong) E Chong | 1 | 5
4 | (United States) K Volynets | 5 | 4
(Mexico) M Zacarías | 7 | 6

Semifinals
D Shnaider | 2 | 7 | 6
(Mexico) M Zacarías | 6 | 5 | 1

=== Bottom half ===
First round
7 | (Australia) A Sharma | 6 | 6
Q | (Serbia) K Kozarov | 0 | 2
(Japan) H Sakatsume | 6 | 6
Q | (United States) T Kinard | 1 | 2
(United States) D Hewitt | 4 | 4
(United States) A Lahey | 6 | 6
WC | (United States) A Rogers | 4 | 0
3 | (Sweden) R Peterson | 6 | 6
8 | (Argentina) N Podoroska | 6^{3} | 2
WC | (Belgium) Y Wickmayer | 7^{7} | 6
Q | (Sweden) L Zaar | 1 | 6^{5}
(United States) S Chang | 6 | 7^{7}
A Isaeva | 1 | 6 | 6
(Ukraine) K Volodko | 6 | 4 | 3
Q | (Indonesia) A Sutjiadi | 0 | 2
2 | (China) Y Yuan | 6 | 6

Second round
7 | (Australia) A Sharma | 6^{1} | 6 | 6
(Japan) H Sakatsume | 7^{7} | 4 | 2
(United States) A Lahey | 6^{5} | 1
3 | (Sweden) R Peterson | 7^{7} | 6
WC | (Belgium) Y Wickmayer | 6 | 6
(United States) S Chang | 2 | 2
A Isaeva | 2 | 3
2 | (China) Y Yuan | 6 | 6

Quarterfinals
7 | (Australia) A Sharma | 6^{4} | 5
3 | (Sweden) R Peterson | 7^{7} | 7
WC | (Belgium) Y Wickmayer | 2 | 2
2 | (China) Y Yuan | 6 | 6

Semifinals
3 | (Sweden) R Peterson | 3 | 6^{4}
2 | (China) Y Yuan | 6 | 7^{7}
