= 2021 Henderson Tennis Open – Singles =

2021 ITF Women's World Tennis Tour

Singles
- 2021 Henderson Tennis Open

Final
- Champion: (United States) Emina Bektas
- Runner-up: (Japan) Yuriko Lily Miyazaki
- Score: 6–1, 6–1

Events
Singles	Doubles
← 2019 ·	Henderson Tennis Open	· 2022 →

Mayo Hibi was the defending champion but chose to compete at the 2021 BNP Paribas Open instead.

Emina Bektas won the title, defeating Yuriko Lily Miyazaki in the final, 6–1, 6–1.

== Seeds ==
1. (Switzerland) Conny Perrin (first round)
2. (United States) Allie Kiick (quarterfinals)
3. (Japan) Yuriko Lily Miyazaki (final)
4. (United States) Hanna Chang (semifinals)
5. (United States) Alexa Glatch (first round)
6. (United States) Emina Bektas (champion)
7. (Switzerland) Lulu Sun (second round)
8. (Japan) Nagi Hanatani (first round)

== Draw ==
=== Key ===
- Q = Qualifier
- WC = Wild card
- LL = Lucky loser
- Alt = Alternate
- SE = Special exempt
- PR = Protected ranking
- ITF = ITF entry
- JE = Junior exempt
- w/o = Walkover
- r = Retired
- d = Defaulted
- SR = Special ranking

=== Finals ===
Semifinals
6	(United States) Emina Bektas	6	6
4	(United States) Hanna Chang	1	2
3	(Japan) Yuriko Lily Miyazaki	6	6
(United States) Chanelle Van Nguyen	2	2

Final
6	(United States) Emina Bektas	6	6
3	(Japan) Yuriko Lily Miyazaki	1	1

=== Top half ===
First round
1	(Switzerland) C Perrin	3	5
Q	(Mexico) M Zacarías	6	7
Q	(Israel) S Azran	1	3
Q	(United States) E Oosterhout	6	6
Q	(United States) H Verner	0	1
PR	(Japan) H Kuwata	6	6
WC	(United States) H Giavara	0	0
6	(United States) E Bektas	6	6
4	(United States) H Chang	6	6
Q	(United States) T Mar	0	3
(United States) Q Gleason	2	6	1
(Russia) A Isaeva	6	0	6
Q	(United States) I Clement	2	0
(United Kingdom) T Moore	6	6
WC	(United States) R McAdoo	1	1
7	(Switzerland) L Sun	6	6

Second round
Q	(Mexico) M Zacarías	6	6
Q	(United States) E Oosterhout	1	1
PR	(Japan) H Kuwata	3	6^{6}
6	(United States) E Bektas	6	7^{8}
4	(United States) H Chang	7	7^{7}
(Russia) A Isaeva	5	6^{5}
(United Kingdom) T Moore	6	1	6
7	(Switzerland) L Sun	2	6	2

Quarterfinals
Q	(Mexico) M Zacarías	0	5
6	(United States) E Bektas	6	7
4	(United States) H Chang	2	6	6
(United Kingdom) T Moore	6	4	4

Semifinals
6	(United States) E Bektas	6	6
4	(United States) H Chang	1	2

=== Bottom half ===
First round
8	(Japan) N Hanatani	2	1
(United States) D Hewitt	6	6
Q	(United States) R Newborn	1	2
(United States) A Zhu	6	6
(United States) T Kinard	2	1
(United States) S Chang	6	6
WC	(United States) A Riley	1	0
3	(Japan) YL Miyazaki	6	6
5	(United States) A Glatch	6	4	1
(United States) C Van Nguyen	0	6	6
Q	(Sweden) M Helgesson	3	3
(Slovakia) T Mihalíková	6	6
PR	(United States) L Chirico	6	4	7^{7}
(United States) J Aney	4	6	6^{4}
WC	(United States) S Mohamad	1	2
2	(United States) A Kiick	6	6

Second round
(United States) D Hewitt	6	7^{8}
(United States) A Zhu	3	6^{6}
(United States) S Chang	6	5	3
3	(Japan) YL Miyazaki	3	7	6
(United States) C Van Nguyen	6	6
(Slovakia) T Mihalíková	4	3
PR	(United States) L Chirico	6	3	6^{6}
2	(United States) A Kiick	3	6	7^{8}

Quarterfinals
(United States) D Hewitt	6	3	4
3	(Japan) YL Miyazaki	2	6	6
(United States) C Van Nguyen	2	6	6
2	(United States) A Kiick	6	4	1

Semifinals
3	(Japan) YL Miyazaki	6	6
(United States) C Van Nguyen	2	2
