= 2016 Red Rock Pro Open – Doubles =

Doubles
- 2016 Red Rock Pro Open

Final
- Champions: (Netherlands) Michaëlla Krajicek (United States) Maria Sanchez
- Runners-up: (United States) Jamie Loeb (South Africa) Chanel Simmonds
- Score: 7–5, 6–1

Events
Singles	Doubles
← 2015 ·	Red Rock Pro Open	· 2017 →

Julia Boserup and Nicole Gibbs were the defending champions, but chose not to participate.

Michaëlla Krajicek and Maria Sanchez won the title, defeating Jamie Loeb and Chanel Simmonds in the final, 7–5, 6–1.

== Seeds ==
1. (Belgium) Ysaline Bonaventure / (Poland) Paula Kania (withdrew)
2. (Netherlands) Michaëlla Krajicek / (United States) Maria Sanchez (champions)
3. (Belgium) Elise Mertens / (Luxembourg) Mandy Minella (semifinals)
4. (Paraguay) Verónica Cepede Royg / (Brazil) Paula Cristina Gonçalves (first round, retired)

== Draw ==
=== Key ===
- Q = Qualifier
- WC = Wild card
- LL = Lucky loser
- Alt = Alternate
- SE = Special exempt
- PR = Protected ranking
- ITF = ITF entry
- JE = Junior exempt
- w/o = Walkover
- r = Retired
- d = Defaulted
- SR = Special ranking

First round
Alt	(Japan) M Hibi (Germany) L Schaeder	1	0
(United States) S Chang (United Kingdom) L Robson	6	6
(Serbia) J Jakšić (United States) T Townsend	6	5	[10]
(Argentina) N Podoroska (France) S Reix	3	7	[8]
4	(Paraguay) V Cepede Royg (Brazil) PC Gonçalves	7^{7}	1^{r}
(United States) J Loeb (South Africa) C Simmonds	6^{3}	3
(France) A Lim (Russia) V Solovyeva	6	6
(Bosnia and Herzegovina) E Burgić Bucko (Mexico) R Zarazúa	2	2
WC	(United States) A Facey (United States) K Facey	5	4
(Finland) E Laine (Germany) A Zaja	7	6
WC	(China) Z Yang (China) A Zhu	3	2
3	(Belgium) E Mertens (Luxembourg) M Minella	6	6
(United States) K Ahn (Hungary) F Stollár	4	6	[10]
(United States) S Marand (United States) M Oudin	6	3	[4]
(United States) J Elbaba (United States) J Wacnik	6^{4}	4
2	(Netherlands) M Krajicek (United States) M Sanchez	7^{7}	6

Quarterfinals
(United States) S Chang (United Kingdom) L Robson	4	2
(Serbia) J Jakšić (United States) T Townsend	6	6
(United States) J Loeb (South Africa) C Simmonds	3	6	[10]
(France) A Lim (Russia) V Solovyeva	6	2	[4]
(Finland) E Laine (Germany) A Zaja	1	4
3	(Belgium) E Mertens (Luxembourg) M Minella	6	6
(United States) K Ahn (Hungary) F Stollár
2	(Netherlands) M Krajicek (United States) M Sanchez	w/o

Semifinals
(Serbia) J Jakšić (United States) T Townsend	4	4
(United States) J Loeb (South Africa) C Simmonds	6	6
3	(Belgium) E Mertens (Luxembourg) M Minella	3	5
2	(Netherlands) M Krajicek (United States) M Sanchez	6	7

Final
(United States) J Loeb (South Africa) C Simmonds	5	1
2	(Netherlands) M Krajicek (United States) M Sanchez	7	6
