= 2021 Henderson Tennis Open – Doubles =

2021 ITF Women's World Tennis Tour

Doubles
- 2021 Henderson Tennis Open

Final
- Champions: (United States) Quinn Gleason (Slovakia) Tereza Mihalíková
- Runners-up: (United States) Emina Bektas (United Kingdom) Tara Moore
- Score: 7–6^{(7–5)}, 7–5

Events
Singles	Doubles
← 2019 ·	Henderson Tennis Open	· 2022 →

Olga Govortsova and Mandy Minella were the defending champions but chose not to participate.

Quinn Gleason and Tereza Mihalíková won the title, defeating Emina Bektas and Tara Moore in the final, 7–6^{(7–5)}, 7–5.

== Seeds ==
1. (United States) Emina Bektas / (United Kingdom) Tara Moore (final)
2. (United States) Quinn Gleason / (Slovakia) Tereza Mihalíková (champions)
3. (Japan) Yuriko Lily Miyazaki / (Switzerland) Conny Perrin (first round)
4. (United States) Hanna Chang / (Japan) Hiroko Kuwata (first round)

== Draw ==
=== Key ===
- Q = Qualifier
- WC = Wild card
- LL = Lucky loser
- Alt = Alternate
- SE = Special exempt
- PR = Protected ranking
- ITF = ITF entry
- JE = Junior exempt
- w/o = Walkover
- r = Retired
- d = Defaulted
- SR = Special ranking

=== Draw ===
First round
1	(United States) E Bektas (United Kingdom) T Moore	6	5	[10]
(United States) S Chang (United States) A Glatch	4	7	[6]
(Canada) A Broomfield (United States) H Verner	1	0
(United States) A Kulikov (United States) R Valdes	6	6
4	(United States) H Chang (Japan) H Kuwata	3	6^{4}
(United States) H Giavara (Switzerland) L Sun	6	7^{7}
WC	(United States) T Mar (United States) E Oosterhout	6	1	[5]
(United States) J Aney (United States) R McAdoo	3	6	[10]
(Japan) N Hanatani (United States) A Zhu	6	2	[10]
WC	(Israel) S Azran (Sweden) M Helgesson	4	6	[8]
(United States) D Hewitt (United States) C Van Nguyen	3	6	[10]
3	(Japan) YL Miyazaki (Switzerland) C Perrin	6	4	[8]
WC	(United States) A Parson-Siegel (United States) YR Sugai	3	1
(United States) A Kiick (United States) A Riley	6	6
(Russia) M Kononova (United States) R Newborn	2	1
2	(United States) Q Gleason (Slovakia) T Mihalíková	6	6

Quarterfinals
1	(United States) E Bektas (United Kingdom) T Moore	6	6
(United States) A Kulikov (United States) R Valdes	4	3
(United States) H Giavara (Switzerland) L Sun	6	6
(United States) J Aney (United States) R McAdoo	4	4
(Japan) N Hanatani (United States) A Zhu	4	4
(United States) D Hewitt (United States) C Van Nguyen	6	6
(United States) A Kiick (United States) A Riley	0	1
2	(United States) Q Gleason (Slovakia) T Mihalíková	6	6

Semifinals
1	(United States) E Bektas (United Kingdom) T Moore	6	7^{7}
(United States) H Giavara (Switzerland) L Sun	1	6^{5}
(United States) D Hewitt (United States) C Van Nguyen	6^{4}	1
2	(United States) Q Gleason (Slovakia) T Mihalíková	7^{7}	6

Final
1	(United States) E Bektas (United Kingdom) T Moore	6^{5}	5
2	(United States) Q Gleason (Slovakia) T Mihalíková	7^{7}	7
