= 2011 Lexus of Las Vegas Open =

- Date: 26 September–2 October
- Edition: 3rd
- Location: Las Vegas, United States

Champions

Singles
- (Italy) Romina Oprandi

Doubles
- (United States) Alexa Glatch / (United States) Mashona Washington
← 2010 ·	Lexus of Las Vegas Open	· 2012 →

The 2011 Lexus of Las Vegas Open was a professional tennis tournament played on hard courts. It was the third edition of the tournament which was part of the 2011 ITF Women's Circuit. It took place in Las Vegas, United States between 26 September and 2 October 2011.

== WTA entrants ==
=== Seeds ===
Country	Player	Rank^{1}	Seed
GEO	Anna Tatishvili	85	1
CRO	Mirjana Lučić	96	2
USA	Varvara Lepchenko	101	3
ROU	Edina Gallovits-Hall	107	4
USA	Melanie Oudin	113	5
USA	Alison Riske	117	6
USA	Jamie Hampton	129	7
ITA	Romina Oprandi	131	8

- ^{1} Rankings are as of September 19, 2011.

=== Other entrants ===
The following players received wildcards into the singles main draw:

- (United States) Julia Boserup
- (United States) Asia Muhammad
- (United States) Maria Sanchez
- (United States) Allie Will

The following players received entry from the qualifying draw:

- (Russia) Vasilisa Bardina
- (Canada) Gabriela Dabrowski
- (China) Duan Yingying
- (United States) Krista Hardebeck

== Champions ==
=== Singles ===
(Italy) Romina Oprandi def. (United States) Alexa Glatch, 6–7^{(2–7)}, 6–3, 7–6^{(7–4)}

=== Doubles ===
(United States) Alexa Glatch / (United States) Mashona Washington def. (United States) Varvara Lepchenko / (United States) Melanie Oudin, 6–4, 6–2
