= 2016 Red Rock Pro Open – Singles =

Singles
- 2016 Red Rock Pro Open

Final
- Champion: (Belgium) Alison Van Uytvanck
- Runner-up: (United States) Sofia Kenin
- Score: 3–6, 7–6^{(7–4)}, 6–2

Events
Singles	Doubles
← 2015 ·	Red Rock Pro Open	· 2017 →

Michaëlla Krajicek was the defending champion, but lost to Sachia Vickery in the second round.

Alison Van Uytvanck won the title, defeating Sofia Kenin in the final, 3–6, 7–6^{(7–4)}, 6–2.

== Seeds ==
1. (Belgium) Alison Van Uytvanck (champion)
2. (Luxembourg) Mandy Minella (second round)
3. (United States) Julia Boserup (first round)
4. (Belgium) Elise Mertens (second round)
5. (Paraguay) Verónica Cepede Royg (first round)
6. (United States) Taylor Townsend (quarterfinals)
7. (Paraguay) Montserrat González (first round)
8. (United States) Sachia Vickery (quarterfinals)

== Main draw ==
=== Key ===
- Q = Qualifier
- WC = Wild card
- LL = Lucky loser
- Alt = Alternate
- SE = Special exempt
- PR = Protected ranking
- ITF = ITF entry
- JE = Junior exempt
- w/o = Walkover
- r = Retired
- d = Defaulted
- SR = Special ranking

=== Finals ===
Semifinals
1	(Belgium) Alison Van Uytvanck	6	3
Q	(Hungary) Fanny Stollár	1	3^{r}
WC	(United States) Sofia Kenin	4	6	6
(Argentina) Nadia Podoroska	6	2	3

Final
1	(Belgium) Alison Van Uytvanck	3	7^{7}	6
WC	(United States) Sofia Kenin	6	6^{4}	2

=== Top half ===
First round
1	(Belgium) A Van Uytvanck	5	6	6
LL	(United States) K Day	7	3	1
WC	(United States) S Chang	1	2
Q	(Czech Republic) M Bouzková	6	6
(France) A Lim	5	3
(Bulgaria) S Karatantcheva	7	6
(Poland) P Kania	3	6	3
6	(United States) T Townsend	6	1	6
4	(Belgium) E Mertens	6	6
Q	(United States) J Elbaba	4	4
Q	(Hungary) F Stollár	3	6	6
(Russia) V Solovyeva	6	4	3
(Portugal) M Larcher de Brito	5	6^{7}
(United Kingdom) L Robson	7	7^{9}
(Serbia) J Jakšić	7	7
5	(Paraguay) V Cepede Royg	5	5

Second round
1	(Belgium) A Van Uytvanck	7	6
Q	(Czech Republic) M Bouzková	5	1
(Bulgaria) S Karatantcheva	0	6^{5}
6	(United States) T Townsend	6	7^{7}
4	(Belgium) E Mertens	6^{7}	6^{6}
Q	(Hungary) F Stollár	7^{9}	7^{8}
(United Kingdom) L Robson	6^{5}	6	4
(Serbia) J Jakšić	7^{7}	2	6

Quarterfinals
1	(Belgium) A Van Uytvanck	6	6
6	(United States) T Townsend	1	4
Q	(Hungary) F Stollár	6	7
(Serbia) J Jakšić	2	5

Semifinals
1	(Belgium) A Van Uytvanck	6	3
Q	(Hungary) F Stollár	1	3^{r}

=== Bottom half ===
First round
7	(Paraguay) M González	5	6	3
(United States) K Ahn	7	4	6
Q	(Germany) A Zaja	4	4
WC	(United States) S Kenin	6	6
(France) S Reix	3	0^{r}
WC	(United States) M Sanchez	6	3
(United States) J Loeb	7	6
3	(United States) J Boserup	5	4
8	(United States) S Vickery	3	7^{7}	6
(Belgium) Y Bonaventure	6	6^{5}	3
(Netherlands) M Krajicek	6	6
(Japan) M Hibi	1	4
(Argentina) N Podoroska	6	0	6
(Canada) F Abanda	4	6	4
WC	(United States) M Oudin	3	2
2	(Luxembourg) M Minella	6	6

Second round
(United States) K Ahn	3	0^{r}
WC	(United States) S Kenin	6	0
WC	(United States) M Sanchez	2	6	6
(United States) J Loeb	6	3	2
8	(United States) S Vickery	2	6	6
(Netherlands) M Krajicek	6	4	2
(Argentina) N Podoroska	6	6
2	(Luxembourg) M Minella	3	2

Quarterfinals
WC	(United States) S Kenin	6	3	6
WC	(United States) M Sanchez	2	6	1
8	(United States) S Vickery	1	2
(Argentina) N Podoroska	6	6

Semifinals
WC	(United States) S Kenin	4	6	6
(Argentina) N Podoroska	6	2	3
