= 2022 Henderson Tennis Open – Doubles =

Doubles
- 2022 Henderson Tennis Open

Final
- Champions: (United States) Carmen Corley (United States) Ivana Corley
- Runners-up: (Serbia) Katarina Kozarov; Veronica Miroshnichenko
- Score: 6–2, 6–0

Events
| Singles | Doubles |
| ← 2021 · | Henderson Tennis Open | · 2023 → |

Quinn Gleason and Tereza Mihalíková were the defending champions, but both players chose not to participate.

Carmen and Ivana Corley won the title, defeating Katarina Kozarov and Veronica Miroshnichenko in the final, 6–2, 6–0.

== Seeds ==
1. (United States) Sophie Chang / (Indonesia) Aldila Sutjiadi (semifinals)
2. (Hong Kong) Eudice Chong / (Australia) Alexandra Osborne (first round)
3. (Chinese Taipei) Hsu Chieh-yu / (Ukraine) Kateryna Volodko (first round)
4. (Argentina) Nadia Podoroska / (Australia) Astra Sharma (first round)

== Draw ==
=== Key ===
- Q = Qualifier
- WC = Wild card
- LL = Lucky loser
- Alt = Alternate
- SE = Special exempt
- PR = Protected ranking
- ITF = ITF entry
- JE = Junior exempt
- w/o = Walkover
- r = Retired
- d = Defaulted
- SR = Special ranking

=== Draw ===
First round
1 | (United States) S Chang (Indonesia) A Sutjiadi | 6 | 6
(United States) M Aubuchon (United States) M Lewis | 0 | 0
(United States) J Bernales (United States) P Corley | 7 | 6
(United States) S Colling (Switzerland) C Fontenel | 5 | 3
4 | (Argentina) N Podoroska (Australia) A Sharma | 2 | 2
(United States) C Corley (United States) I Corley | 6 | 6
(United States) R Newborn (United States) E Turner | 1 | 2
(United States) D Hewitt (United States) A Lahey | 6 | 6
(United States) S Mohamad (United States) L Pinson | 1 | 2
D Shnaider (United States) A Smith | 6 | 6
(United States) A Reami (United States) A Rogers | 6^{5} | 7 | [10]
3 | (Chinese Taipei) C-y Hsu (Ukraine) K Volodko | 7^{7} | 5 | [4]
(United States) R McAdoo (Japan) A Okuno | 4 | 6 | [5]
(United States) A Glatch (Sweden) L Zaar | 6 | 3 | [10]
(Serbia) K Kozarov; V Miroshnichenko | 6 | 6
2 | (Hong Kong) E Chong (Australia) A Osborne | 3 | 3

Quarterfinals
1 | (United States) S Chang (Indonesia) A Sutjiadi | 6 | 6
(United States) J Bernales (United States) P Corley | 1 | 2
(United States) C Corley (United States) I Corley | 4 | 7^{7} | [11]
(United States) D Hewitt (United States) A Lahey | 6 | 6^{5} | [9]
D Shnaider (United States) A Smith | 6 | 4 | [8]
(United States) A Reami (United States) A Rogers | 4 | 6 | [10]
(United States) A Glatch (Sweden) L Zaar | 1 | 4
(Serbia) K Kozarov; V Miroshnichenko | 6 | 6

Semifinals
1 | (United States) S Chang (Indonesia) A Sutjiadi | 6 | 3 | [10]
(United States) C Corley (United States) I Corley | 4 | 6 | [12]
(United States) A Reami (United States) A Rogers | 6 | 4 | [8]
(Serbia) K Kozarov; V Miroshnichenko | 4 | 6 | [10]

Final
(United States) C Corley (United States) I Corley | 6 | 6
(Serbia) K Kozarov; V Miroshnichenko | 2 | 0
