= 2015 Red Rock Pro Open =

- Date: 28 September–4 October
- Edition: 7th
- Category: ITF Women's Circuit
- Prize money: $50,000
- Surface: Hard
- Location: Las Vegas, United States

Champions

Singles
- (Netherlands) Michaëlla Krajicek

Doubles
- (United States) Julia Boserup / (United States) Nicole Gibbs
← 2014 ·	Red Rock Pro Open	· 2016 →

The 2015 Red Rock Pro Open was a professional tennis tournament played on outdoor hard courts. It was the seventh edition of the tournament and part of the 2015 ITF Women's Circuit, offering a total of $50,000 in prize money. It took place in Las Vegas, United States, on 28 September–4 October 2015.

== Singles main draw entrants ==
=== Seeds ===
Country	Player	Rank^{1}	Seed
BEL	An-Sophie Mestach	105	1
USA	Anna Tatishvili	109	2
SUI	Romina Oprandi	114	3
USA	Sachia Vickery	134	4
USA	Alexa Glatch	139	5
USA	Nicole Gibbs	144	6
USA	Shelby Rogers	154	7
USA	Jessica Pegula	158	8

- ^{1} Rankings as of 21 September 2015

=== Other entrants ===
The following players received wildcards into the singles main draw:

- (United States) Lauren Albanese
- (United States) Melanie Oudin
- (United States) Alexandra Stevenson
- (China) Yang Zi

The following players received entry from the qualifying draw:

- (United States) Robin Anderson
- (Germany) Antonia Lottner
- (France) Shérazad Reix
- (Switzerland) Amra Sadiković

The following player received entry by a lucky loser spot:

- (Germany) Anna Zaja

The following player received entry by a protected ranking:

- (United Kingdom) Lisa Whybourn

The following player received entry by a special exempt:

- (Netherlands) Michaëlla Krajicek

== Champions ==
=== Singles ===
- (Netherlands) Michaëlla Krajicek def. (United States) Shelby Rogers, 6–3, 6–1

=== Doubles ===
- (United States) Julia Boserup / (United States) Nicole Gibbs def. (Brazil) Paula Cristina Gonçalves / (United States) Sanaz Marand, 6–3, 6–4
