= 2011 Lexus of Las Vegas Open – Doubles =

Doubles
- 2011 Lexus of Las Vegas Open

Final
- Champions: (United States) Alexa Glatch (United States) Mashona Washington
- Runners-up: (United States) Varvara Lepchenko (United States) Melanie Oudin
- Score: 6–4, 6–2

Events
Singles	Doubles
← 2010 ·	Lexus of Las Vegas Open	· 2012 →

Lindsay Lee-Waters and Megan Moulton-Levy were the defending champions, but both players chose not to participate.
Alexa Glatch and Mashona Washington won the title by defeating Varvara Lepchenko and Melanie Oudin in the final 6–4, 6–2.

== Seeds ==
1. (United States) Jamie Hampton / (Georgia (country)) Anna Tatishvili (first round)
2. (France) Irena Pavlovic / (Germany) Kathrin Wörle (first round)
3. (United States) Alexa Glatch / (United States) Mashona Washington (champions)
4. (France) Julie Coin / (Russia) Valeria Savinykh (first round)

== Draw ==
=== Key ===
- Q = Qualifier
- WC = Wild card
- LL = Lucky loser
- Alt = Alternate
- SE = Special exempt
- PR = Protected ranking
- ITF = ITF entry
- JE = Junior exempt
- w/o = Walkover
- r = Retired
- d = Defaulted
- SR = Special ranking

=== Draw ===
First round
1	(United States) J Hampton (Georgia (country)) A Tatishvili	3	3
WC	(United States) S Rogers (United States) A Will	6	6
(United States) M Harkins (United States) A Rolle	6	6
(Hungary) T Babos (Slovenia) P Rampre	4	3
4	(France) J Coin (Russia) V Savinykh	3	3
(United States) V Lepchenko (United States) M Oudin	6	6
(United States) B Augustine (United States) M Brengle	2	1
Alt	(Colombia) Y Lizarazo (United States) N Melichar	6	6
(United States) A Riske (United States) A Weinhold	6	6
(United States) J Boserup (Denmark) M Ejdesgaard	4	2
(United States) A Mueller (United States) A Muhammed	4	1
3	(United States) A Glatch (United States) M Washington	6	6
WC	(Russia) A Gabueva (Czech Republic) E Hrdinová	4	6^{3}
(Canada) G Dabrowski (Germany) L Siegemund	6	7^{7}
(United States) M Sanchez (United States) Y Schnack	6	6
2	(France) I Pavlovic (Germany) K Wörle	4	3

Quarterfinals
WC	(United States) S Rogers (United States) A Will	5	5
(United States) M Harkins (United States) A Rolle	7	7
(United States) V Lepchenko (United States) M Oudin	6	6
Alt	(Colombia) Y Lizarazo (United States) N Melichar	3	1
(United States) A Riske (United States) A Weinhold	2	5
3	(United States) A Glatch (United States) M Washington	6	7
(Canada) G Dabrowski (Germany) L Siegemund	2	3
(United States) M Sanchez (United States) Y Schnack	6	6

Semifinals
(United States) M Harkins (United States) A Rolle	4	3
(United States) V Lepchenko (United States) M Oudin	6	6
3	(United States) A Glatch (United States) M Washington	3	7	[10]
(United States) M Sanchez (United States) Y Schnack	6	5	[8]

Finals
(United States) V Lepchenko (United States) M Oudin	4	2
3	(United States) A Glatch (United States) M Washington	6	6
