= 2015 Red Rock Pro Open – Doubles =

Doubles
- 2015 Red Rock Pro Open

Final
- Champions: (United States) Julia Boserup (United States) Nicole Gibbs
- Runners-up: (Brazil) Paula Cristina Gonçalves (United States) Sanaz Marand
- Score: 6–3, 6–4

Events
Singles	Doubles
← 2014 ·	Red Rock Pro Open	· 2016 →

Verónica Cepede Royg and María Irigoyen were the defending champions, but Cepede Royg chose not to compete and Irigoyen chose to compete in Victoria instead.

Wildcards Julia Boserup and Nicole Gibbs won the title, defeating the top seeds Paula Cristina Gonçalves and Sanaz Marand in the final, 6–3, 6–4.

== Seeds ==
1. (Brazil) Paula Cristina Gonçalves / (United States) Sanaz Marand (final)
2. (France) Stéphanie Foretz / (Croatia) Ana Vrljić (first round)
3. (Germany) Antonia Lottner / (Turkey) Pemra Özgen (semifinals)
4. (United States) Jan Abaza / (Poland) Justyna Jegiołka (first round)

== Draw ==
=== Key ===
- Q = Qualifier
- WC = Wild card
- LL = Lucky loser
- Alt = Alternate
- SE = Special exempt
- PR = Protected ranking
- ITF = ITF entry
- JE = Junior exempt
- w/o = Walkover
- r = Retired
- d = Defaulted
- SR = Special ranking

First round
1	(Brazil) PC Gonçalves (United States) S Marand	6^{5}	6	[10]
(Netherlands) L Kerkhove (Netherlands) A Rus	7^{7}	3	[5]
(United States) J Cako (United States) K Christian	4	3
(United States) L Albanese (United States) S Chang	6	6
4	(United States) J Abaza (Poland) J Jegiołka	4	3
(United States) R Anderson (United States) J Brady	6	6
(Austria) T Paszek (United States) A Tatishvili	3	7^{7}	[10]
(Serbia) J Jakšić (United States) T Townsend	6	6^{4}	[8]
WC	(United States) A Facey (United States) K Facey	6	6
(South Africa) M Sammons (Germany) L Schäder	1	4
(Belgium) A-S Mestach (United States) J Pegula	4	5
3	(Germany) A Lottner (Turkey) P Özgen	6	7
WC	(United States) J Boserup (United States) N Gibbs	6	6
(Thailand) V Wongteanchai (China) A Zhu	4	3
(Luxembourg) M Minella (Switzerland) A Sadiković	4	6	[10]
2	(France) S Foretz (Croatia) A Vrljić	6	3	[8]

Quarterfinals
1	(Brazil) PC Gonçalves (United States) S Marand	6	7
(United States) L Albanese (United States) S Chang	3	5
(United States) R Anderson (United States) J Brady	6	7^{7}
(Austria) T Paszek (United States) A Tatishvili	2	6^{4}
WC	(United States) A Facey (United States) K Facey	1	3
3	(Germany) A Lottner (Turkey) P Özgen	6	6
WC	(United States) J Boserup (United States) N Gibbs	2	6	[10]
(Luxembourg) M Minella (Switzerland) A Sadiković	6	4	[5]

Semifinals
1	(Brazil) PC Gonçalves (United States) S Marand	7	6
(United States) R Anderson (United States) J Brady	5	3
3	(Germany) A Lottner (Turkey) P Özgen	3	0
WC	(United States) J Boserup (United States) N Gibbs	6	6

Final
1	(Brazil) PC Gonçalves (United States) S Marand	3	4
WC	(United States) J Boserup (United States) N Gibbs	6	6
