= 2014 Red Rock Pro Open =

- Date: 22–28 September
- Edition: 6th
- Category: ITF Women's Circuit
- Prize money: $50,000
- Surface: Hard
- Location: Las Vegas, United States

Champions

Singles
- (United States) Madison Brengle

Doubles
- (Paraguay) Verónica Cepede Royg / (Argentina) María Irigoyen
| ← 2013 · | Red Rock Pro Open | · 2015 → |

The 2014 Red Rock Pro Open was a professional tennis tournament played on outdoor hard courts. It was the sixth edition of the tournament which was part of the 2014 ITF Women's Circuit, offering a total of $50,000 in prize money. It took place in Las Vegas, United States, on 22–28 September 2014.

== Singles main draw entrants ==
=== Seeds ===
| Country | Player | Rank^{1} | Seed |
|---|---|---|---|
| CZE | Tereza Smitková | 89 | 1 |
| HUN | Tímea Babos | 104 | 2 |
| USA | Anna Tatishvili | 105 | 3 |
| USA | Madison Brengle | 112 | 4 |
| SRB | Jovana Jakšić | 123 | 5 |
| USA | Melanie Oudin | 124 | 6 |
| PAR | Verónica Cepede Royg | 129 | 7 |
| POR | Michelle Larcher de Brito | 137 | 8 |

- ^{1} Rankings as of 15 September 2014

=== Other entrants ===
The following players received wildcards into the singles main draw:

- (United States) Jennifer Brady
- (Czech Republic) Nicole Vaidišová
- (United States) Caitlin Whoriskey

The following players received entry from the qualifying draw:

- (Ukraine) Kateryna Bondarenko
- (Bosnia and Herzegovina) Ema Burgić
- (United States) Samantha Crawford
- (United States) Alexa Glatch

== Champions ==
=== Singles ===
- (United States) Madison Brengle def. (Portugal) Michelle Larcher de Brito, 6–1, 6–4

=== Doubles ===
- (Paraguay) Verónica Cepede Royg / (Argentina) María Irigoyen def. (United States) Asia Muhammad / (United States) Maria Sanchez, 6–3, 5–7, [11–9]
