= 2017 Red Rock Pro Open – Singles =

Singles
- 2017 Red Rock Pro Open

Final
- Champion: (Bulgaria) Sesil Karatantcheva
- Runner-up: (Bulgaria) Elitsa Kostova
- Score: 6–4, 4–6, 7–5

Events
| Singles | Doubles |
| ← 2016 · | Red Rock Pro Open | · 2018 → |

Alison Van Uytvanck was the defending champion, but chose not to participate.

Sesil Karatantcheva won the title, defeating Elitsa Kostova in the final, 6–4, 4–6, 7–5.

== Seeds ==
1. (United States) Louisa Chirico (quarterfinals)
2. (Austria) Barbara Haas (first round)
3. (Czech Republic) Marie Bouzková (second round)
4. (Slovakia) Anna Karolína Schmiedlová (semifinals)
5. (Serbia) Ivana Jorović (quarterfinals)
6. (United Kingdom) Laura Robson (second round)
7. (Bulgaria) Sesil Karatantcheva (champion)
8. (Bulgaria) Elitsa Kostova (final)

== Draw ==
=== Key ===
- Q = Qualifier
- WC = Wild card
- LL = Lucky loser
- Alt = Alternate
- SE = Special exempt
- PR = Protected ranking
- ITF = ITF entry
- JE = Junior exempt
- w/o = Walkover
- r = Retired
- d = Defaulted
- SR = Special ranking

=== Finals ===
Semifinals
7 | (Bulgaria) Sesil Karatantcheva | 4 | 6 | 7
(Mexico) Renata Zarazúa | 6 | 4 | 5
4 | (Slovakia) Anna Karolína Schmiedlová | 5 | 4
8 | (Bulgaria) Elitsa Kostova | 7 | 6

Final
7 | (Bulgaria) Sesil Karatantcheva | 6 | 4 | 7
8 | (Bulgaria) Elitsa Kostova | 4 | 6 | 5

=== Top half ===
First round
1 | (United States) L Chirico | 6 | 6
(Colombia) E Arango | 4 | 1
(France) S Reix | 6 | 6
WC | (Australia) L Ashley | 1 | 2
(United States) S Chang | 6 | 2 | 6
(United States) F Di Lorenzo | 3 | 6 | 2
(United States) A Kratzer | 4 | 3
7 | (Bulgaria) S Karatantcheva | 6 | 6
3 | (Czech Republic) M Bouzková | 7^{7} | 6
(United States) K Stewart | 6^{1} | 3
(United States) E Bektas | 3 | 6 | 2
(Spain) P Badosa Gibert | 6 | 4 | 6
(Mexico) R Zarazúa | 1 | 6 | 7
(United States) R Kingsley | 6 | 2 | 5
(United States) C Van Nguyen | 5 | 6 | 6^{3}
6 | (United Kingdom) L Robson | 7 | 4 | 7^{7}

Second round
1 | (United States) L Chirico | 7 | 6
(France) S Reix | 5 | 1
(United States) S Chang | 1 | 5
7 | (Bulgaria) S Karatantcheva | 6 | 7
3 | (Czech Republic) M Bouzková | 4 | 3
(Spain) P Badosa Gibert | 6 | 6
(Mexico) R Zarazúa | 7 | 6
6 | (United Kingdom) L Robson | 5 | 2

Quarterfinals
1 | (United States) L Chirico | 0 | 1
7 | (Bulgaria) S Karatantcheva | 6 | 6
(Spain) P Badosa Gibert | 6 | 5 | 3
(Mexico) R Zarazúa | 1 | 7 | 6

Semifinals
7 | (Bulgaria) S Karatantcheva | 4 | 6 | 7
(Mexico) R Zarazúa | 6 | 4 | 5

=== Bottom half ===
First round
5 | (Serbia) I Jorović | 6 | 6
(United States) M Gordon | 2 | 2
PR | (United States) A Kiick | 6 | 6
(United Kingdom) K Boulter | 3 | 2
Q | (United States) N Coopersmith | 2 | 7 | 6
Q | (United States) S Marand | 6 | 5 | 3
(Russia) A Potapova | 6 | 4 | 6^{5}
4 | (Slovakia) AK Schmiedlová | 2 | 6 | 7^{7}
8 | (Bulgaria) E Kostova | 6 | 6
(Belgium) A-S Mestach | 2 | 2
(Chinese Taipei) C-y Hsu | 1 | 6 | 6
(Slovakia) Z Zlochová | 6 | 2 | 1
Q | (United States) M Mateas | 6 | 6
(Italy) C Ferrando | 2 | 4
Q | (Russia) E Bovina | 6 | 6
2 | (Austria) B Haas | 4 | 2

Second round
5 | (Serbia) I Jorović | 6 | 7
PR | (United States) A Kiick | 2 | 5
Q | (United States) N Coopersmith | 6^{6} | 2
4 | (Slovakia) AK Schmiedlová | 7^{8} | 6
8 | (Bulgaria) E Kostova | 6 | 6
(Chinese Taipei) C-y Hsu | 3 | 1
Q | (United States) M Mateas | 7^{7} | 6
Q | (Russia) E Bovina | 6^{5} | 2

Quarterfinals
5 | (Serbia) I Jorović | 5 | 2
4 | (Slovakia) AK Schmiedlová | 7 | 6
8 | (Bulgaria) E Kostova | 4 | 6 | 7^{7}
Q | (United States) M Mateas | 6 | 2 | 6^{5}

Semifinals
4 | (Slovakia) AK Schmiedlová | 5 | 4
8 | (Bulgaria) E Kostova | 7 | 6
