= 2016 Kentucky Bank Tennis Championships – Men's singles =

Men's singles
- 2016 Kentucky Bank Tennis Championships

Final
- Champion: (United States) Ernesto Escobedo
- Runner-up: (United States) Frances Tiafoe
- Score: 6–2, 6–7^{(6–8)}, 7–6^{(7–3)}

Events
Singles	men	women
Doubles	men	women
- Kentucky Bank Tennis Championships

John Millman was the defending champion but chose not to defend his title.

Ernesto Escobedo won the title after defeating Frances Tiafoe 6–2, 6–7^{(6–8)}, 7–6^{(7–3)} in the final.

== Seeds ==
1. (France) Adrian Mannarino (second round)
2. (Tunisia) Malek Jaziri (second round)
3. (United Kingdom) Daniel Evans (first round)
4. (Australia) Jordan Thompson (second round)
5. (United States) Bjorn Fratangelo (first round)
6. (France) Quentin Halys (first round)
7. (United States) Frances Tiafoe (final)
8. (United States) Stefan Kozlov (second round)

== Draw ==
Key

- Q = Qualifier
- WC = Wild card
- LL = Lucky loser
- Alt = Alternate
- ITF = ITF entry
- PR = Protected ranking
- SR = Special ranking
- SE = Special exempt
- JE = Junior exempt
- JR = Junior Accelerator Programme entrant
- CO = College Accelerator Programme entrant
- NG = Next Gen Accelerator Program entrant
- w/o = Walkover
- r = Retired
- d = Defaulted

=== Finals ===
Semifinals
7	(United States) Frances Tiafoe	3	6	6
WC	(United States) Brian Baker	6	2	2
(United States) Ernesto Escobedo	6	6^{1}	6
(Australia) Andrew Whittington	1	7^{7}	1

Final
7	(United States) Frances Tiafoe	2	7^{8}	6^{3}
(United States) Ernesto Escobedo	6	6^{6}	7^{7}

=== Top half ===
First round
1	(France) A Mannarino	6	6
(Japan) H Moriya	1	4
Q	(United States) M McDonald	6^{5}	2
(United States) M Krueger	7^{7}	6
(United Kingdom) B Klein	6	6
WC	(United States) E Quigley	3	4
(United States) T Paul	3	1
7	(United States) F Tiafoe	6	6
3	(United Kingdom) D Evans	5	6	6^{6}
WC	(United States) B Baker	7	4	7^{8}
WC	(United States) W Bushamuka	2	2
(United Kingdom) L Broady	6	6
Alt	(Argentina) JI Londero	2	7^{7}	4
Q	(United States) A Kuznetsov	6	6^{4}	6
(Kazakhstan) A Golubev	2	2
8	(United States) S Kozlov	6	6

Second round
1	(France) A Mannarino	2	6	4
(United States) M Krueger	6	1	6
(United Kingdom) B Klein	4	6	4
7	(United States) F Tiafoe	6	3	6
WC	(United States) B Baker	6	6
(United Kingdom) L Broady	4	3
Q	(United States) A Kuznetsov	3	6	6
8	(United States) S Kozlov	6	3	4

Quarterfinals
(United States) M Krueger	3	4
7	(United States) F Tiafoe	6	6
WC	(United States) B Baker	6	6^{7}	6
Q	(United States) A Kuznetsov	4	7^{9}	4

Semifinals
7	(United States) F Tiafoe	3	6	6
WC	(United States) B Baker	6	2	2

=== Bottom half ===
First round
6	(France) Q Halys	2	2
(United States) N Meister	6	6
Q	(United Kingdom) L Glasspool	6	3
(United Kingdom) J Ward	3	1^{r}
(Brazil) G Clezar	3	6^{4}
(United States) E Escobedo	6	7^{7}
WC	(United States) R Shane	4	4
4	(Australia) J Thompson	6	6
5	(United States) B Fratangelo	3	2
(Australia) A Whittington	6	6
(India) R Ramanathan	4	6	6
(Australia) L Saville	6	2	1
Q	(United States) J Witten	1	3
(United States) D Nguyen	6	6
(United States) S Bangoura	3	6^{6}
2	(Tunisia) M Jaziri	6	7^{8}

Second round
(United States) N Meister	3	2
Q	(United Kingdom) L Glasspool	6	6
(United States) E Escobedo	6	7
4	(Australia) J Thompson	4	5
(Australia) A Whittington	7^{7}	4	6
(India) R Ramanathan	6^{4}	6	4
(United States) D Nguyen	6	4	6
2	(Tunisia) M Jaziri	4	6	1

Quarterfinals
Q	(United Kingdom) L Glasspool	7^{9}	5	3
(United States) E Escobedo	6^{7}	7	6
(Australia) A Whittington	7	5	6
(United States) D Nguyen	5	7	1

Semifinals
(United States) E Escobedo	6	6^{1}	6
(Australia) A Whittington	1	7^{7}	1
