= 2014 Red Rock Pro Open – Singles =

Singles
- 2014 Red Rock Pro Open

Final
- Champion: (United States) Madison Brengle
- Runner-up: (Portugal) Michelle Larcher de Brito
- Score: 6–1, 6–4

Events
Singles	Doubles
← 2013 ·	Red Rock Pro Open	· 2015 →

Melanie Oudin was the defending champion, having won the event in 2013, but lost in the second round to Jennifer Brady.

Madison Brengle won the title, defeating Michelle Larcher de Brito 6–1, 6–4 in the final.

== Seeds ==
1. (Czech Republic) Tereza Smitková (first round)
2. (Hungary) Tímea Babos (quarterfinals)
3. (United States) Anna Tatishvili (semifinals)
4. (United States) Madison Brengle (champion)
5. (Serbia) Jovana Jakšić (first round)
6. (United States) Melanie Oudin (second round)
7. (Paraguay) Verónica Cepede Royg (second round)
8. (Portugal) Michelle Larcher de Brito (final)

== Main draw ==
=== Key ===
- Q = Qualifier
- WC = Wild card
- LL = Lucky loser
- Alt = Alternate
- SE = Special exempt
- PR = Protected ranking
- ITF = ITF entry
- JE = Junior exempt
- w/o = Walkover
- r = Retired
- d = Defaulted
- SR = Special ranking

=== Finals ===
Semifinals
Q	(Ukraine) Kateryna Bondarenko	2	4
4	(United States) Madison Brengle	6	6
3	(United States) Anna Tatishvili	3	5
8	(Portugal) Michelle Larcher de Brito	6	7

Final
4	(United States) Madison Brengle	6	6
8	(Portugal) Michelle Larcher de Brito	1	4

=== Top half ===
First round
1	(Czech Republic) T Smitková	6^{6}	4
Q	(Ukraine) K Bondarenko	7^{8}	6
WC	(United States) C Whoriskey	6	6
(United States) L Chirico	3	0
(Paraguay) M González	6	7^{7}
(Canada) G Dabrowski	1	6^{0}
(Kazakhstan) S Karatantcheva	7	3	6
5	(Serbia) J Jakšić	5	6	0
4	(United States) M Brengle	6	6
(United States) J Boserup	4	4
Q	(United States) S Crawford	6	6
(United States) S Marand	4	2
Q	(United States) A Glatch	6	4	2
WC	(Czech Republic) N Vaidišová	2	6	6
(United States) A Muhammad	3	5
7	(Paraguay) V Cepede Royg	6	7

Second round
Q	(Ukraine) K Bondarenko	6	4	6
WC	(United States) C Whoriskey	3	6	4
(Paraguay) M González	6	1	0
(Kazakhstan) S Karatantcheva	4	6	6
4	(United States) M Brengle	6	7^{7}
Q	(United States) S Crawford	1	6^{2}
WC	(Czech Republic) N Vaidišová	6	6
7	(Paraguay) V Cepede Royg	0	2

Quarterfinals
Q	(Ukraine) K Bondarenko	6	6
(Kazakhstan) S Karatantcheva	1	3
4	(United States) M Brengle	6	6
WC	(Czech Republic) N Vaidišová	4	3

Semifinals
Q	(Ukraine) K Bondarenko	2	4
4	(United States) M Brengle	6	6

=== Bottom half ===
First round
6	(United States) M Oudin	6	6
(United Kingdom) N Broady	3	2
(France) A Hesse	6^{1}	6	3
WC	(United States) J Brady	7^{7}	4	6
(Argentina) M Irigoyen	2	3
(United States) I Falconi	6	6
(Canada) H El Tabakh	4	3
3	(United States) A Tatishvili	6	6
8	(Portugal) M Larcher de Brito	6	6
(United Kingdom) T Moore	1	3
Q	(Bosnia and Herzegovina) E Burgić	6	6
(Italy) G Barbieri	4	0
(Poland) P Kania	6	6
(Poland) U Radwańska	3	1
(Slovenia) N Kolar	1	2
2	(Hungary) T Babos	6	6

Second round
6	(United States) M Oudin	6^{6}	6^{3}
WC	(United States) J Brady	7^{8}	7^{7}
(United States) I Falconi	3	6^{3}
3	(United States) A Tatishvili	6	7^{7}
8	(Portugal) M Larcher de Brito	3	6	7^{7}
Q	(Bosnia and Herzegovina) E Burgić	6	3	6^{5}
(Poland) P Kania	4	4
2	(Hungary) T Babos	6	6

Quarterfinals
WC	(United States) J Brady	3	6	5
3	(United States) A Tatishvili	6	3	7
8	(Portugal) M Larcher de Brito	6	6
2	(Hungary) T Babos	3	4

Semifinals
3	(United States) A Tatishvili	3	5
8	(Portugal) M Larcher de Brito	6	7
