= 2016 Kentucky Bank Tennis Championships – Men's doubles =

Men's doubles
- 2016 Kentucky Bank Tennis Championships

Final
- Champion: (Australia) Luke Saville (Australia) Jordan Thompson
- Runner-up: (South Africa) Nicolaas Scholtz (South Africa) Tucker Vorster
- Score: 6–2, 7–5

Events
| Singles | men | women |
| Doubles | men | women |
- Kentucky Bank Tennis Championships

Carsten Ball and Brydan Klein were the defending champions but only Klein returned, partnering Andrew Whittington. Klein lost in the first round to Jeevan Nedunchezhiyan and Ramkumar Ramanathan.

Luke Saville and Jordan Thompson won the title after defeating Nicolaas Scholtz and Tucker Vorster 6–2, 7–5 in the final.

== Seeds ==
1. (Denmark) Frederik Nielsen / (Republic of Ireland) David O'Hare (quarterfinals)
2. (South Africa) Dean O'Brien / (South Africa) Ruan Roelofse (quarterfinals)
3. (Kazakhstan) Andrey Golubev / (Australia) Matt Reid (first round)
4. (Australia) Luke Saville / (Australia) Jordan Thompson (champions)

== Draw ==
Key

- Q = Qualifier
- WC = Wild card
- LL = Lucky loser
- Alt = Alternate
- ITF = ITF entry
- PR = Protected ranking
- SR = Special ranking
- SE = Special exempt
- JE = Junior exempt
- JR = Junior Accelerator Programme entrant
- CO = College Accelerator Programme entrant
- NG = Next Gen Accelerator Program entrant
- w/o = Walkover
- r = Retired
- d = Defaulted

First round
1 | (Denmark) F Nielsen (Republic of Ireland) D O'Hare | 4 | 6 | [10]
Q | (United States) A Lawson (United States) Austin Smith | 6 | 2 | [5]
(Japan) H Moriya (Japan) Y Uchiyama | 7^{7} | 5 | [10]
WC | (United States) Jordi Arconada (United States) F Tiafoe | 6^{5} | 7 | [5]
3 | (Kazakhstan) A Golubev (Australia) M Reid | 6^{4} | 3
(South Africa) N Scholtz (South Africa) T Vorster | 7^{7} | 6
(United States) S Bangoura (New Zealand) J Statham | 7^{7} | 6
WC | (United States) Beck Pennington (United States) J Witten | 6^{4} | 3
WC | (Norway) Nils Ellefsen (France) Enzo Wallart | 0 | 4
(United States) N Meister (United States) E Quigley | 6 | 6
(Brazil) G Clezar (Brazil) M Demoliner | 3 | 2
4 | (Australia) L Saville (Australia) J Thompson | 6 | 6
(United Kingdom) B Klein (Australia) A Whittington | 6^{5} | 6 | [10]
(India) J Nedunchezhiyan (India) R Ramanathan | 7^{7} | 4 | [12]
(United States) M Krueger (United States) M McDonald | 4 | 4
2 | (South Africa) D O'Brien (South Africa) R Roelofse | 6 | 6

Quarterfinals
1 | (Denmark) F Nielsen (Republic of Ireland) D O'Hare | 6^{4} | 2
(Japan) H Moriya (Japan) Y Uchiyama | 7^{7} | 6
(South Africa) N Scholtz (South Africa) T Vorster | 7^{7} | 6
(United States) S Bangoura (New Zealand) J Statham | 6^{5} | 3
(United States) N Meister (United States) E Quigley | 2 | 2
4 | (Australia) L Saville (Australia) J Thompson | 6 | 6
(India) J Nedunchezhiyan (India) R Ramanathan | 6 | 6
2 | (South Africa) D O'Brien (South Africa) R Roelofse | 4 | 2

Semifinals
(Japan) H Moriya (Japan) Y Uchiyama | 3 | 5
(South Africa) N Scholtz (South Africa) T Vorster | 6 | 7
4 | (Australia) L Saville (Australia) J Thompson | 7 | 6
(India) J Nedunchezhiyan (India) R Ramanathan | 5 | 2

Final
(South Africa) N Scholtz (South Africa) T Vorster | 2 | 5
4 | (Australia) L Saville (Australia) J Thompson | 6 | 7
