= 2019 Henderson Tennis Open – Doubles =

Doubles
- 2019 Henderson Tennis Open

Final
- Champions: (Belarus) Olga Govortsova (Luxembourg) Mandy Minella
- Runners-up: (United States) Sophie Chang (United States) Alexandra Mueller
- Score: 6–3, 6–4

Events
Singles	Doubles
← 2018 ·	Henderson Tennis Open	· 2021 →

Asia Muhammad and Maria Sanchez were the defending champions, but chose not to participate.

Olga Govortsova and Mandy Minella won the title, defeating Sophie Chang and Alexandra Mueller in the final, 6–3, 6–4.

== Seeds ==
1. (Mexico) Giuliana Olmos / (Australia) Ellen Perez (quarterfinals)
2. (Canada) Eugenie Bouchard / (Hungary) Fanny Stollár (semifinals)
3. (Belarus) Olga Govortsova / (Luxembourg) Mandy Minella (champions)
4. (Montenegro) Vladica Babić / (United States) Caitlin Whoriskey (quarterfinals)

== Draw ==
=== Key ===
- Q = Qualifier
- WC = Wild card
- LL = Lucky loser
- Alt = Alternate
- SE = Special exempt
- PR = Protected ranking
- ITF = ITF entry
- JE = Junior exempt
- w/o = Walkover
- r = Retired
- d = Defaulted
- SR = Special ranking

=== Draw ===
First round
1	(Mexico) G Olmos (Australia) E Perez	7	6
WC	(United States) J Livianu (United States) R McAdoo	5	2
(United States) A Glatch (United States) Q Gleason	6	6
(Russia) A Gabueva (United States) S Whittle	3	4
4	(Montenegro) V Babić (United States) C Whoriskey	7^{11}	6
(United States) D Hewitt (United States) A Parks	6^{9}	4
WC	(United States) M Brettkelly (United States) N Cheong	6	2	[4]
(United States) S Chang (United States) A Mueller	3	6	[10]
(Indonesia) B Gumulya (Indonesia) J Rompies	6	6
WC	(United States) A Desiatnikov (United States) K Kovick	2	3
(United States) J Cako (United States) S Vickery	4	6^{1}
3	(Belarus) O Govortsova (Luxembourg) M Minella	6	7^{7}
(Chinese Taipei) C-y Hsu (Mexico) M Zacarías	6	6
(United States) V Lepchenko (France) M Partaud	3	0
(Spain) M Gutiérrez Carrasco (Germany) S Wagner	3	3
2	(Canada) E Bouchard (Hungary) F Stollár	6	6

Quarterfinals
1	(Mexico) G Olmos (Australia) E Perez	4	6	[7]
(United States) A Glatch (United States) Q Gleason	6	1	[10]
4	(Montenegro) V Babić (United States) C Whoriskey	4	6^{7}
(United States) S Chang (United States) A Mueller	6	7^{9}
(Indonesia) B Gumulya (Indonesia) J Rompies	6^{5}	6	[2]
3	(Belarus) O Govortsova (Luxembourg) M Minella	7^{7}	3	[10]
(Chinese Taipei) C-y Hsu (Mexico) M Zacarías	4	7^{7}	[3]
2	(Canada) E Bouchard (Hungary) F Stollár	6	6^{1}	[10]

Semifinals
(United States) A Glatch (United States) Q Gleason	3	3
(United States) S Chang (United States) A Mueller	6	6
3	(Belarus) O Govortsova (Luxembourg) M Minella	6	6
2	(Canada) E Bouchard (Hungary) F Stollár	3	3

Final
(United States) S Chang (United States) A Mueller	3	4
3	(Belarus) O Govortsova (Luxembourg) M Minella	6	6
