= 2016 Kentucky Bank Tennis Championships – Women's singles =

Women's singles
- 2016 Kentucky Bank Tennis Championships

Final
- Champion: (Netherlands) Michaëlla Krajicek
- Runner-up: (Australia) Arina Rodionova
- Score: 6–0, 2–6, 6–2

Events
Singles	men	women
Doubles	men	women
- Kentucky Bank Tennis Championships

Nao Hibino was the defending champion, but chose to participate in Montreal instead.

Michaëlla Krajicek won the title, defeating Arina Rodionova in the final, 6–0, 2–6, 6–2.

== Seeds ==
1. (Belgium) Alison Van Uytvanck (quarterfinals, retired)
2. (Czech Republic) Kristýna Plíšková (withdrew)
3. (Romania) Ana Bogdan (withdrew)
4. (China) Zhu Lin (second round)
5. (Japan) Hiroko Kuwata (quarterfinals)
6. (United States) Grace Min (first round)
7. (Japan) Miyu Kato (first round)
8. (Russia) Anastasia Pivovarova (first round)
9. (Belgium) An-Sophie Mestach (second round)

== Main draw ==
Key

- Q = Qualifier
- WC = Wild card
- LL = Lucky loser
- Alt = Alternate
- ITF = ITF entry
- PR = Protected ranking
- SR = Special ranking
- SE = Special exempt
- JE = Junior exempt
- JR = Junior Accelerator Programme entrant
- CO = College Accelerator Programme entrant
- NG = Next Gen Accelerator Program entrant
- w/o = Walkover
- r = Retired
- d = Defaulted

=== Finals ===
Semifinals
(Australia) Arina Rodionova	7^{7}	6
(United States) Jamie Loeb	6^{1}	1
(Serbia) Jovana Jakšić	3	6^{6}
(Netherlands) Michaëlla Krajicek	6	7^{8}

Final
(Australia) Arina Rodionova	0	6	2
(Netherlands) Michaëlla Krajicek	6	2	6

=== Top half ===
First round
1	(Belgium) A Van Uytvanck	4	7	6
(United States) C Bellis	6	5	1
(United States) M Oudin	6^{2}	1
Q	(Australia) A Bai	7^{7}	6
WC	(United States) S Marand	6	2	4
(Australia) Ar Rodionova	2	6	6
(Japan) R Sawayanagi	7^{7}	6
7	(Japan) M Kato	6^{5}	4
4	(China) L Zhu	7	6
(Japan) M Hibi	5	2
(United States) J Loeb	6	6
Q	(Italy) C Ferrando	4	3
(Portugal) M Larcher de Brito	7	3	3
(United States) K Ahn	5	6	6
Q	(Belgium) G Minnen	6	6
8	(Russia) A Pivovarova	2	1

Second round
1	(Belgium) A Van Uytvanck	6	6
Q	(Australia) A Bai	2	3
(Australia) Ar Rodionova	6	6
(Japan) R Sawayanagi	1	4
4	(China) L Zhu	6	1	2
(United States) J Loeb	4	6	6
(United States) K Ahn	2	3
Q	(Belgium) G Minnen	6	6

Quarterfinals
1	(Belgium) A Van Uytvanck	2^{r}
(Australia) Ar Rodionova	4
(United States) J Loeb	7	6
Q	(Belgium) G Minnen	5	3

Semifinals
(Australia) Ar Rodionova	7^{7}	6
(United States) J Loeb	6^{1}	1

=== Bottom half ===
First round
5	(Japan) H Kuwata	5	6	6
SE	(United States) S Kenin	7	4	0
LL	(United Kingdom) K Dunne	6	6
LL	(United Kingdom) L Robson	4	4
(Serbia) J Jakšić	6	6
(United States) M Sanchez	3	4
(Mexico) V Rodríguez	1	2
9	(Belgium) A-S Mestach	6	6
6	(United States) G Min	4	6	5
WC	(United States) F Di Lorenzo	6	4	7
WC	(United States) J Elie	2	4
(Uzbekistan) S Sharipova	6	6
WC	(United States) C Dolehide	7	2	2
(Netherlands) M Krajicek	5	6	6
LL	(United Kingdom) E Webley-Smith	4	6	3
Q	(Australia) O Rogowska	6	3	6

Second round
5	(Japan) H Kuwata	6	2
LL	(United Kingdom) K Dunne	4	1^{r}
(Serbia) J Jakšić	7^{7}	6
9	(Belgium) A-S Mestach	6^{5}	0
WC	(United States) F Di Lorenzo	6	6^{3}	1
(Uzbekistan) S Sharipova	2	7^{7}	6
(Netherlands) M Krajicek	6	6
Q	(Australia) O Rogowska	1	1

Quarterfinals
5	(Japan) H Kuwata	5	3
(Serbia) J Jakšić	7	6
(Uzbekistan) S Sharipova	6^{3}	6	6^{2}
(Netherlands) M Krajicek	7^{7}	1	7^{7}

Semifinals
(Serbia) J Jakšić	3	6^{6}
(Netherlands) M Krajicek	6	7^{8}
