= 2018 Red Rock Pro Open – Singles =

Singles
- 2018 Red Rock Pro Open

Final
- Champion: (Switzerland) Belinda Bencic
- Runner-up: (United States) Nicole Gibbs
- Score: 7–5, 6–1

Events
| Singles | Doubles |
| ← 2017 · | Red Rock Pro Open | · 2019 → |

Sesil Karatantcheva was the defending champion, but lost in the first round to Grace Min.

Belinda Bencic won the title, defeating Nicole Gibbs in the final, 7–5, 6–1.

== Seeds ==
1. (Switzerland) Belinda Bencic (champion)
2. (United Kingdom) Heather Watson (second round)
3. (Hungary) Fanny Stollár (quarterfinals)
4. (United States) Varvara Lepchenko (first round)
5. (Russia) Sofya Zhuk (first round)
6. (Czech Republic) Marie Bouzková (quarterfinals)
7. (Paraguay) Verónica Cepede Royg (quarterfinals)
8. (United States) Nicole Gibbs (final)

== Draw ==
=== Key ===
- Q = Qualifier
- WC = Wild card
- LL = Lucky loser
- Alt = Alternate
- ITF = ITF entry
- PR = Protected ranking
- SR = Special ranking
- SE = Special exempt
- JE = Junior exempt
- JR = Junior Accelerator Programme entrant
- CO = College Accelerator Programme entrant
- NG = Next Gen Accelerator Program entrant
- w/o = Walkover
- r = Retired
- d = Defaulted

=== Finals ===
Semifinals
1 | (Switzerland) Belinda Bencic | 6 | 6
(Japan) Kurumi Nara | 1 | 4
Q | (Mexico) Giuliana Olmos | 2 | 4
8 | (United States) Nicole Gibbs | 6 | 6

Final
1 | (Switzerland) Belinda Bencic | 7 | 6
8 | (United States) Nicole Gibbs | 5 | 1

=== Top half ===
First round
1 | (Switzerland) B Bencic | 6 | 6
(Italy) J Paolini | 3 | 3
(United Kingdom) N Broady | 7^{7} | 6
(Netherlands) R Hogenkamp | 6^{5} | 4
WC | (United States) K Day | 4 | 2
(United States) L Davis | 6 | 6
PR | (Argentina) N Podoroska | 3 | 1
6 | (Czech Republic) M Bouzková | 6 | 6
4 | (United States) V Lepchenko | 6 | 3 | 2
(Japan) K Nara | 3 | 6 | 6
PR | (United States) E Halbauer | 4 | 3
WC | (United States) L Chirico | 6 | 6
(United States) A Kiick | 7 | 0 | 6
(Italy) D Chiesa | 5 | 6 | 3
(Brazil) B Haddad Maia | 5 | 3
7 | (Paraguay) V Cepede Royg | 7 | 6

Second round
1 | (Switzerland) B Bencic | 6 | 6
(United Kingdom) N Broady | 4 | 2
(United States) L Davis | 2 | 1
6 | (Czech Republic) M Bouzková | 6 | 6
(Japan) K Nara | 2 | 6 | 6
WC | (United States) L Chirico | 6 | 2 | 3
(United States) A Kiick | 6 | 2 | 2
7 | (Paraguay) V Cepede Royg | 1 | 6 | 6

Quarterfinals
1 | (Switzerland) B Bencic | 1 | 6 | 6
6 | (Czech Republic) M Bouzková | 6 | 1 | 4
(Japan) K Nara | 6 | 7
7 | (Paraguay) V Cepede Royg | 4 | 5

Semifinals
1 | (Switzerland) B Bencic | 6 | 6
(Japan) K Nara | 1 | 4

=== Bottom half ===
First round
5 | (Russia) S Zhuk | 7^{7} | 5 | 5
Q | (Mexico) G Olmos | 6^{4} | 7 | 7
(Russia) V Flink | 6^{5} | 6 | 0
WC | (United States) M Mateas | 7^{7} | 4 | 0^{r}
(United States) A Muhammad | 6 | 3 | 3
Q | (United States) H Chang | 4 | 6 | 6
(Bulgaria) E Kostova | 3 | 3
3 | (Hungary) F Stollár | 6 | 6
8 | (United States) N Gibbs | 7 | 6
Q | (United States) M Sanchez | 5 | 0
(Bulgaria) S Karatantcheva | 6^{4} | 4
(United States) G Min | 7^{7} | 6
(United States) D Lao | 6 | 6
Q | (United States) J Elie | 3 | 3
(Norway) U Eikeri | 3 | 2
2 | (United Kingdom) H Watson | 6 | 6

Second round
Q | (Mexico) G Olmos | 6 | 6
(Russia) V Flink | 3 | 2
Q | (United States) H Chang | 3 | 4
3 | (Hungary) F Stollár | 6 | 6
8 | (United States) N Gibbs | 6 | 7
(United States) G Min | 2 | 5
(United States) D Lao | 5 | 6 | 6
2 | (United Kingdom) H Watson | 7 | 1 | 1

Quarterfinals
Q | (Mexico) G Olmos | 6 | 6
3 | (Hungary) F Stollár | 4 | 2
8 | (United States) N Gibbs | 6^{2} | 6 | 6
(United States) D Lao | 7^{7} | 4 | 3

Semifinals
Q | (Mexico) G Olmos | 2 | 4
8 | (United States) N Gibbs | 6 | 6
