= 2019 Henderson Tennis Open – Singles =

Singles
- 2019 Henderson Tennis Open

Final
- Champion: (Japan) Mayo Hibi
- Runner-up: (Ukraine) Anhelina Kalinina
- Score: 6–2, 5–7, 6–2

Events
Singles	Doubles
← 2018 ·	Henderson Tennis Open	· 2021 →

Belinda Bencic was the defending champion, but chose not to participate.

Mayo Hibi won the title, defeating Anhelina Kalinina in the final, 6–2, 5–7, 6–2.

== Seeds ==
1. (Belgium) Kirsten Flipkens (first round)
2. (Romania) Patricia Maria Țig (first round, retired)
3. (Ukraine) Katarina Zavatska (semifinals)
4. (Switzerland) Stefanie Vögele (first round)
5. (United States) Varvara Lepchenko (quarterfinals)
6. (United States) Ann Li (second round)
7. (United States) Sachia Vickery (second round, retired)
8. (United States) Caroline Dolehide (quarterfinals)

== Draw ==
=== Key ===
- Q = Qualifier
- WC = Wild card
- LL = Lucky loser
- Alt = Alternate
- SE = Special exempt
- PR = Protected ranking
- ITF = ITF entry
- JE = Junior exempt
- w/o = Walkover
- r = Retired
- d = Defaulted
- SR = Special ranking

=== Finals ===
Semifinals
(Canada) Katherine Sebov	3	0
(Ukraine) Anhelina Kalinina	6	6
3	(Ukraine) Katarina Zavatska	6^{10}	4
(Japan) Mayo Hibi	7^{12}	6

Final
(Ukraine) Anhelina Kalinina	2	7	2
(Japan) Mayo Hibi	6	5	6

=== Top half ===
First round
1	(Belgium) K Flipkens	4	6	5
Q	(United States) A Parks	6	3	7
(Canada) K Sebov	6	6
Q	(United States) Q Gleason	4	4
(United Kingdom) K Swan	5	2
(Belarus) O Govortsova	7	6
Q	(Spain) M Gutiérrez Carrasco	4	3
7	(United States) S Vickery	6	6
4	(Switzerland) S Vögele	2	2
WC	(Hungary) F Stollár	6	6
WC	(United States) G Min	1	6	4
(Ukraine) A Kalinina	6	4	6
(France) J Ponchet	5	4
LL	(Mexico) G Olmos	7	6
WC	(United States) J Loeb	2	0
5	(United States) V Lepchenko	6	6

Second round
Q	(United States) A Parks	0	6^{9}
(Canada) K Sebov	6	7^{11}
(Belarus) O Govortsova	6	4	4
7	(United States) S Vickery	2	6	1^{r}
WC	(Hungary) F Stollár	7^{7}	1	4
(Ukraine) A Kalinina	6^{3}	6	6
LL	(Mexico) G Olmos	6	3	4
5	(United States) V Lepchenko	2	6	6

Quarterfinals
(Canada) K Sebov	6	6
(Belarus) O Govortsova	3	2
(Ukraine) A Kalinina	6	6
5	(United States) V Lepchenko	3	3

Semifinals
(Canada) K Sebov	3	0
(Ukraine) A Kalinina	6	6

=== Bottom half ===
First round
8	(United States) C Dolehide	6	6
Q	(Montenegro) V Babić	0	1
Q	(United States) N Subhash	6	6
(Sweden) J Larsson	3	2
Q	(Mexico) M Zacarías	4	1
(Luxembourg) M Minella	6	6
WC	(United States) K Stewart	3^{r}
3	(Ukraine) K Zavatska	2
6	(United States) A Li	7^{7}	6
(Australia) E Perez	6^{5}	4
SE	(United States) A Glatch	7^{11}	6
Q	(United States) C Chavatipon	6^{9}	4
Q	(Germany) S Wagner	7	6
(Bulgaria) E Kostova	5	2
(Japan) M Hibi	2
2	(Romania) PM Țig	2^{r}

Second round
8	(United States) C Dolehide	6	6
Q	(United States) N Subhash	3	3
(Luxembourg) M Minella	5	3
3	(Ukraine) K Zavatska	7	6
6	(United States) A Li	4	4
SE	(United States) A Glatch	6	6
Q	(Germany) S Wagner	5	2
(Japan) M Hibi	7	6

Quarterfinals
8	(United States) C Dolehide	2	6	4
3	(Ukraine) K Zavatska	6	4	6
SE	(United States) A Glatch	5	1
(Japan) M Hibi	7	6

Semifinals
3	(Ukraine) K Zavatska	6^{10}	4
(Japan) M Hibi	7^{12}	6
