= 2011 Lexus of Las Vegas Open – Singles =

Singles
- 2011 Lexus of Las Vegas Open

Final
- Champion: (Italy) Romina Oprandi
- Runner-up: (United States) Alexa Glatch
- Score: 6–7^{(2–7)}, 6–3, 7–6^{(7–4)}

Events
Singles	Doubles
- Lexus of Las Vegas Open

Varvara Lepchenko was the defending champion, but lost in the second round to Kurumi Nara.
Romina Oprandi won the title by defeating Alexa Glatch in the final 6–7^{(2–7)}, 6–3, 7–6^{(7–4)}.

== Seeds ==
1. (Italy) Romina Oprandi (champion)
2. (Georgia (country)) Anna Tatishvili (quarterfinals)
3. (United States) Varvara Lepchenko (second round)
4. (Croatia) Mirjana Lučić (first round)
5. (United States) Alison Riske (first round)
6. (Romania) Edina Gallovits-Hall (second round, retired)
7. (Russia) Valeria Savinykh (second round)
8. (United States) Jamie Hampton (quarterfinals)

== Main draw ==
Key

- Q = Qualifier
- WC = Wild card
- LL = Lucky loser
- Alt = Alternate
- ITF = ITF entry
- PR = Protected ranking
- SR = Special ranking
- SE = Special exempt
- JE = Junior exempt
- JR = Junior Accelerator Programme entrant
- CO = College Accelerator Programme entrant
- NG = Next Gen Accelerator Program entrant
- w/o = Walkover
- r = Retired
- d = Defaulted

=== Finals ===
Semifinals
1	(Italy) Romina Oprandi	6	7
(Japan) Kurumi Nara	4	5
(United States) Alexa Glatch	1
(Russia) Regina Kulikova	1^{r}

Final
1	(Italy) Romina Oprandi	6^{2}	6	7^{7}
(United States) Alexa Glatch	7^{7}	3	6^{4}

=== Top half ===
First round
1	(Italy) R Oprandi	6	6^{2}	7
(Germany) L Siegemund	4	7^{7}	5
Q	(China) Y Duan	4	0
(Italy) C Giorgi	6	6
WC	(United States) A Will	6	7
(Germany) K Wörle	3	5
Q	(Canada) G Dabrowski	0	2
6	(Romania) E Gallovits-Hall	6	6
3	(United States) V Lepchenko	6	7^{7}
WC	(United States) J Boserup	4	6^{2}
(Japan) K Nara	6	6
(United States) M Brengle	3	1
(Kazakhstan) S Karatantcheva	7	6^{2}	6
(United States) M Oudin	5	7^{7}	0
(Slovenia) P Rampre	6^{4}	1
8	(United States) J Hampton	7^{7}	6

Second round
1	(Italy) R Oprandi	6	6^{5}	7
(Italy) C Giorgi	3	7^{7}	5
WC	(United States) A Will	7	4
6	(Romania) E Gallovits-Hall	5	1^{r}
3	(United States) V Lepchenko	3	0
(Japan) K Nara	6	6
(Kazakhstan) S Karatantcheva	6^{4}	2
8	(United States) J Hampton	7^{7}	6

Quarterfinals
1	(Italy) R Oprandi	7^{8}	6
WC	(United States) A Will	6^{6}	1
(Japan) K Nara	6	6
8	(United States) J Hampton	1	4

Semifinals
1	(Italy) R Oprandi	6	7
(Japan) K Nara	4	5

=== Bottom half ===
First round
5	(United States) A Riske	6	3	3
(United States) A Glatch	4	6	6
(France) I Pavlovic	6^{5}	4
(Hungary) T Babos	7^{7}	6
JE	(Puerto Rico) M Puig	1	5
WC	(United States) M Sanchez	6	7
Q	(United States) K Hardebeck	7^{7}	6
4	(Croatia) M Lučić	6^{4}	4
7	(Russia) V Savinykh	2	6	6
(United States) A Weinhold	6	2	3
(Russia) R Kulikova	6	6
(Croatia) A Tomljanović	1	2
(Portugal) M Larcher de Brito	3	6^{5}
Q	(Russia) V Bardina	6	7^{7}
WC	(United States) A Muhammed	6	3	2
2	(Georgia (country)) A Tatishvili	2	6	6

Second round
(United States) A Glatch	2	6	6
(Hungary) T Babos	6	2	2
WC	(United States) M Sanchez	6	6
Q	(United States) K Hardebeck	3	2
7	(Russia) V Savinykh	1	6	2
(Russia) R Kulikova	6	4	6
Q	(Russia) V Bardina	6	0	2
2	(Georgia (country)) A Tatishvili	3	6	6

Quarterfinals
(United States) A Glatch	6	6
WC	(United States) M Sanchez	1	1
(Russia) R Kulikova	6	7
2	(Georgia (country)) A Tatishvili	3	5

Semifinals
(United States) A Glatch	1
(Russia) R Kulikova	1^{r}

== Bibliography ==
- Main Draw
- Qualifying Draw
