= 2018 Red Rock Pro Open – Doubles =

Doubles
- 2018 Red Rock Pro Open

Final
- Champions: (United States) Asia Muhammad (United States) Maria Sanchez
- Runners-up: (United States) Sophie Chang (United States) Alexandra Mueller
- Score: 6–3, 6–4

Events
Singles	Doubles
← 2017 ·	Red Rock Pro Open	· 2019 →

An-Sophie Mestach and Laura Robson were the defending champions, but both players chose not to participate.

Asia Muhammad and Maria Sanchez won the title, defeating Sophie Chang and Alexandra Mueller in the final, 6–3, 6–4.

== Seeds ==
1. (United States) Desirae Krawczyk / (Mexico) Giuliana Olmos (quarterfinals)
2. (United States) Asia Muhammad / (United States) Maria Sanchez (champions)
3. (United Kingdom) Naomi Broady / (United States) Jacqueline Cako (first round)
4. (United States) Nicole Gibbs / (United Kingdom) Heather Watson (semifinals; withdrew)

== Draw ==
=== Key ===
- Q = Qualifier
- WC = Wild card
- LL = Lucky loser
- Alt = Alternate
- ITF = ITF entry
- PR = Protected ranking
- SR = Special ranking
- SE = Special exempt
- JE = Junior exempt
- JR = Junior Accelerator Programme entrant
- CO = College Accelerator Programme entrant
- NG = Next Gen Accelerator Program entrant
- w/o = Walkover
- r = Retired
- d = Defaulted

=== Draw ===
First round
1	(United States) D Krawczyk (Mexico) G Olmos	6	6
WC	(United States) R Newborn (United States) E Turner	2	0
(United States) S Chang (United States) A Mueller	6	6
(Canada) P Januskova (United States) A Parks	3	3
3	(United Kingdom) N Broady (United States) J Cako	6	1	[7]
(Norway) U Eikeri (Hungary) RL Jani	3	6	[10]
WC	(Czech Republic) M Bouzková (Bulgaria) S Karatantcheva	6	6
WC	(United States) N Mossmer (United States) A Will	4	4
(Brazil) B Haddad Maia (Hungary) F Stollár	5	4
(United States) L Davis (United States) J Elbaba	7	6
(Italy) D Chiesa (Italy) J Paolini	6^{5}	1
4	(United States) N Gibbs (United Kingdom) H Watson	7^{7}	6
(United States) J Elie (United States) E Halbauer	5	4
(France) M Arcangioli (France) S Reix	7	6
(Indonesia) B Gumulya (Indonesia) J Rompies	1	3
2	(United States) A Muhammad (United States) M Sanchez	6	6

Quarterfinals
1	(United States) D Krawczyk (Mexico) G Olmos	2	2
(United States) S Chang (United States) A Mueller	6	6
(Norway) U Eikeri (Hungary) RL Jani	6	6
WC	(Czech Republic) M Bouzková (Bulgaria) S Karatantcheva	1	4
(United States) L Davis (United States) J Elbaba	3	5
4	(United States) N Gibbs (United Kingdom) H Watson	6	7
(France) M Arcangioli (France) S Reix	2	0
2	(United States) A Muhammad (United States) M Sanchez	6	6

Semifinals
(United States) S Chang (United States) A Mueller	6	6
(Norway) U Eikeri (Hungary) RL Jani	3	3
4	(United States) N Gibbs (United Kingdom) H Watson
2	(United States) A Muhammad (United States) M Sanchez	w/o

Final
(United States) S Chang (United States) A Mueller	3	4
2	(United States) A Muhammad (United States) M Sanchez	6	6
