= 2014 Red Rock Pro Open – Doubles =

Doubles
- 2014 Red Rock Pro Open

Final
- Champions: (Paraguay) Verónica Cepede Royg (Argentina) María Irigoyen
- Runners-up: (United States) Asia Muhammad (United States) Maria Sanchez
- Score: 6–3, 5–7, [11–9]

Events
Singles	Doubles
← 2013 ·	Red Rock Pro Open	· 2015 →

Tamira Paszek and Coco Vandeweghe were the defending champions, having won the event in 2013, however both players chose not to participate.

Verónica Cepede Royg and María Irigoyen won the title, defeating Asia Muhammad and Maria Sanchez in the final, 6–3, 5–7, [11–9].

== Seeds ==
1. (United States) Asia Muhammad / (United States) Maria Sanchez (final)
2. (Paraguay) Verónica Cepede Royg / (Argentina) María Irigoyen (champions)
3. (Czech Republic) Eva Hrdinová / (United States) Anna Tatishvili (first round)
4. (United States) Nicole Melichar / (United States) Allie Will (semifinals)

== Draw ==
=== Key ===
- Q = Qualifier
- WC = Wild card
- LL = Lucky loser
- Alt = Alternate
- SE = Special exempt
- PR = Protected ranking
- ITF = ITF entry
- JE = Junior exempt
- w/o = Walkover
- r = Retired
- d = Defaulted
- SR = Special ranking

First round
1	(United States) A Muhammad (United States) M Sanchez	6	6
(Italy) G Barbieri (France) A Hesse	3	1
(Ukraine) K Bondarenko (Serbia) J Jakšić	4	6	[8]
(United Kingdom) N Broady (United States) I Falconi	6	1	[10]
4	(United States) N Melichar (United States) A Will	6	6^{2}	[10]
(United States) J Cako (Romania) C Stancu	3	7^{7}	[6]
(Slovenia) N Kolar (Czech Republic) T Smitková	4	3
(Germany) T Maria (United States) M Oudin	6	6
(United Kingdom) N Slater (Australia) K Wlodarczak	7^{7}	6
WC	(United States) J Brady (United States) L Embree	6^{4}	3
(United States) L Chirico (United States) S Marand	6	6^{2}	[13]
3	(Czech Republic) E Hrdinová (United States) A Tatishvili	1	7^{7}	[11]
(United States) D Muresan (United States) C Whoriskey	4	5
WC	(United States) J Boserup (United States) A Glatch	6	7
(United States) M Brengle (Russia) M Shamayko	1	6	[7]
2	(Paraguay) V Cepede Royg (Argentina) M Irigoyen	6	4	[10]

Quarterfinals
1	(United States) A Muhammad (United States) M Sanchez	6	6
(United Kingdom) N Broady (United States) I Falconi	0	3
4	(United States) N Melichar (United States) A Will	6	7^{7}
(Germany) T Maria (United States) M Oudin	4	6^{5}
(United Kingdom) N Slater (Australia) K Wlodarczak	2	5
(United States) L Chirico (United States) S Marand	6	7
WC	(United States) J Boserup (United States) A Glatch	3	4
2	(Paraguay) V Cepede Royg (Argentina) M Irigoyen	6	6

Semifinals
1	(United States) A Muhammad (United States) M Sanchez	6^{6}	6	[10]
4	(United States) N Melichar (United States) A Will	7^{8}	4	[5]
(United States) L Chirico (United States) S Marand	3	5
2	(Paraguay) V Cepede Royg (Argentina) M Irigoyen	6	7

Final
1	(United States) A Muhammad (United States) M Sanchez	3	7	[9]
2	(Paraguay) V Cepede Royg (Argentina) M Irigoyen	6	5	[11]
