= 2015 Red Rock Pro Open – Singles =

Singles
- 2015 Red Rock Pro Open

Final
- Champion: (Netherlands) Michaëlla Krajicek
- Runner-up: (United States) Shelby Rogers
- Score: 6–3, 6–1

Events
Singles	Doubles
← 2014 ·	Red Rock Pro Open	· 2016 →

Madison Brengle was the defending champion, but she chose to compete in Wuhan instead.

Michaëlla Krajicek won the title, defeating Shelby Rogers in the final, 6–3, 6–1.

== Seeds ==
1. (Belgium) An-Sophie Mestach (first round)
2. (United States) Anna Tatishvili (quarterfinals)
3. (Switzerland) Romina Oprandi (semifinals)
4. (United States) Sachia Vickery (second round)
5. (United States) Alexa Glatch (quarterfinals)
6. (United States) Nicole Gibbs (semifinals)
7. (United States) Shelby Rogers (final)
8. (United States) Jessica Pegula (withdrew)

== Main draw ==
=== Key ===
- Q = Qualifier
- WC = Wild card
- LL = Lucky loser
- Alt = Alternate
- SE = Special exempt
- PR = Protected ranking
- ITF = ITF entry
- JE = Junior exempt
- w/o = Walkover
- r = Retired
- d = Defaulted
- SR = Special ranking

=== Finals ===
Semifinals
6	(United States) Nicole Gibbs	1	6^{6}
SE	(Netherlands) Michaëlla Krajicek	6	7^{8}
3	(Switzerland) Romina Oprandi	4	4
7	(United States) Shelby Rogers	6	6

Final
SE	(Netherlands) Michaëlla Krajicek	6	6
7	(United States) Shelby Rogers	3	1

=== Top half ===
First round
1	(Belgium) A-S Mestach	2	0
(Luxembourg) M Minella	6	6
WC	(United States) L Albanese	6	6
(Turkey) P Özgen	3	2
WC	(United States) M Oudin	5	3
(United States) S Marand	7	6
Q	(France) S Reix	0	7^{7}	3
6	(United States) N Gibbs	6	6^{3}	6
4	(United States) S Vickery	6	6
Q	(Germany) A Lottner	2	2
SE	(Netherlands) M Krajicek	7^{7}	6
(Netherlands) A Rus	6^{5}	4
(Croatia) A Vrljić	6	7^{7}
(Thailand) V Wongteanchai	4	6^{3}
Q	(United States) R Anderson	3	3
5	(United States) A Glatch	6	6

Second round
(Luxembourg) M Minella	6	6
WC	(United States) L Albanese	4	2
(United States) S Marand	3	1
6	(United States) N Gibbs	6	6
4	(United States) S Vickery	7^{7}	3	3
SE	(Netherlands) M Krajicek	6^{4}	6	6
(Croatia) A Vrljić	3	0^{r}
5	(United States) A Glatch	6	0

Quarterfinals
(Luxembourg) M Minella	1	6^{6}
6	(United States) N Gibbs	6	7^{8}
SE	(Netherlands) M Krajicek	6	6
5	(United States) A Glatch	3	1

Semifinals
6	(United States) N Gibbs	1	6^{6}
SE	(Netherlands) M Krajicek	6	7^{8}

=== Bottom half ===
First round
LL	(Germany) A Zaja	1	4
(Austria) T Paszek	6	6
(United States) J Brady	7^{7}	3	6
WC	(United States) A Stevenson	6^{5}	6	3
(Serbia) J Jakšić	3	7^{7}	6
(United States) T Townsend	6	6^{3}	4
(France) S Foretz	3	3
3	(Switzerland) R Oprandi	6	6
7	(United States) S Rogers	6	6
PR	(United Kingdom) L Whybourn	1	2
(United States) S Crawford	6	6
(Netherlands) L Kerkhove	3	3
Q	(Switzerland) A Sadiković	6^{2}	3
(United States) J Boserup	7^{7}	6
WC	(China) Z Yang	4	1
2	(United States) A Tatishvili	6	6

Second round
(Austria) T Paszek	3	3
(United States) J Brady	6	6
(Serbia) J Jakšić	0	1
3	(Switzerland) R Oprandi	6	6
7	(United States) S Rogers	7	6
(United States) S Crawford	5	4
(United States) J Boserup	6	1	2
2	(United States) A Tatishvili	4	6	6

Quarterfinals
(United States) J Brady	4	4
3	(Switzerland) R Oprandi	6	6
7	(United States) S Rogers	6	6
2	(United States) A Tatishvili	4	3

Semifinals
3	(Switzerland) R Oprandi	4	4
7	(United States) S Rogers	6	6
