= 2016 Kentucky Bank Tennis Championships – Women's doubles =

Women's doubles
- 2016 Kentucky Bank Tennis Championships

Final
- Champions: (Japan) Hiroko Kuwata (China) Zhu Lin
- Runners-up: (United States) Sophie Chang (United States) Alexandra Mueller
- Score: 6–0, 7–5

Events
Singles	men	women
Doubles	men	women
- Kentucky Bank Tennis Championships

Nao Hibino and Emily Webley-Smith are the defending champions, Hibino chose not to defend her title. Webley-Smith partnered Riko Sawayanagi, but lost in the quarterfinals.

Hiroko Kuwata and Zhu Lin won the title, defeating Sophie Chang and Alexandra Mueller in the final, 6–0, 7–5.

== Seeds ==
1. (Belgium) An-Sophie Mestach / (United States) Maria Sanchez (semifinals)
2. (United States) Ashley Weinhold / (United States) Caitlin Whoriskey (first round)
3. (Japan) Hiroko Kuwata / (China) Zhu Lin (champions)
4. (Japan) Riko Sawayanagi / (United Kingdom) Emily Webley-Smith (quarterfinals)

== Draw ==
Key

- Q = Qualifier
- WC = Wild card
- LL = Lucky loser
- Alt = Alternate
- ITF = ITF entry
- PR = Protected ranking
- SR = Special ranking
- SE = Special exempt
- JE = Junior exempt
- JR = Junior Accelerator Programme entrant
- CO = College Accelerator Programme entrant
- NG = Next Gen Accelerator Program entrant
- w/o = Walkover
- r = Retired
- d = Defaulted

First round
1	(Belgium) A-S Mestach (United States) M Sanchez	7^{7}	6
(United Kingdom) F Christie (United Kingdom) L Robson	6^{3}	3
Alt	(Australia) L Cabrera (Australia) O Rogowska	2	7^{7}	[5]
(Japan) M Ayukawa (United Kingdom) K Dunne	6	6^{5}	[10]
4	(Japan) R Sawayanagi (United Kingdom) E Webley-Smith	6	6
WC	(United States) MC Haffey (United States) E Raszkiewicz	1	3
(United States) S Chang (United States) A Mueller	6	3	[10]
(Belgium) G Minnen (Belgium) A Van Uytvanck	3	6	[3]
(Australia) A Bai (United States) K Wong	6	7^{7}
(Serbia) J Jakšić (Uzbekistan) S Sharipova	1	6^{3}
WC	(New Zealand) E Fanning (Lithuania) A Paražinskaitė	4	6	[5]
3	(Japan) H Kuwata (China) L Zhu	6	1	[10]
(United States) S Marand (United States) M Oudin	6	6
WC	(United States) A Facey (United States) K Facey	1	4
(United States) C Bellis (United States) J Loeb	6	0	[10]
2	(United States) A Weinhold (United States) C Whoriskey	4	6	[7]

Quarterfinals
1	(Belgium) A-S Mestach (United States) M Sanchez	w/o
(Japan) M Ayukawa (United Kingdom) K Dunne
4	(Japan) R Sawayanagi (United Kingdom) E Webley-Smith	7	4	[3]
(United States) S Chang (United States) A Mueller	5	6	[10]
(Australia) A Bai (United States) K Wong	4	2
3	(Japan) H Kuwata (China) L Zhu	6	6
(United States) S Marand (United States) M Oudin	7^{8}	6
(United States) C Bellis (United States) J Loeb	6^{6}	1

Semifinals
1	(Belgium) A-S Mestach (United States) M Sanchez	3	4
(United States) S Chang (United States) A Mueller	6	6
3	(Japan) H Kuwata (China) L Zhu	6	6
(United States) S Marand (United States) M Oudin	4	4

Final
(United States) S Chang (United States) A Mueller	0	5
3	(Japan) H Kuwata (China) L Zhu	6	7
