= 2017 Red Rock Pro Open – Doubles =

Doubles
- 2017 Red Rock Pro Open

Final
- Champion: (Belgium) An-Sophie Mestach (United Kingdom) Laura Robson
- Runner-up: (United States) Sophie Chang (United States) Alexandra Mueller
- Score: 7–6^{(9–7)}, 7–6^{(7–2)}

Events
Singles	Doubles
← 2016 ·	Red Rock Pro Open	· 2018 →

Michaëlla Krajicek and Maria Sanchez were the defending champions, but both players chose not to participate.

An-Sophie Mestach and Laura Robson won the title, defeating Sophie Chang and Alexandra Mueller in the final, 7–6^{(9–7)}, 7–6^{(7–2)}.

== Seeds ==
1. (Belgium) An-Sophie Mestach / (United Kingdom) Laura Robson (champions)
2. (United States) Sanaz Marand / (Mexico) Renata Zarazúa (first round)
3. (United States) Sophie Chang / (United States) Alexandra Mueller (final)
4. (Chinese Taipei) Hsu Chieh-yu / (United States) Madeleine Kobelt (first round)

== Draw ==
=== Key ===
- Q = Qualifier
- WC = Wild card
- LL = Lucky loser
- Alt = Alternate
- SE = Special exempt
- PR = Protected ranking
- ITF = ITF entry
- JE = Junior exempt
- w/o = Walkover
- r = Retired
- d = Defaulted
- SR = Special ranking

First round
1	(Belgium) A-S Mestach (United Kingdom) L Robson	6	6
(United States) S Abrams (United States) J Kissell	0	2
(Italy) C Ferrando (France) S Reix	2	7	[11]
(Russia) E Bovina (Bulgaria) E Kostova	6	5	[9]
4	(Chinese Taipei) C-y Hsu (United States) M Kobelt	2	6	[7]
(United States) J Failla (United States) K Shaffer	6	3	[10]
(United States) E Bektas (United States) E Shibahara	3	6	[7]
(United States) L Chirico (United States) A Kratzer	6	1	[10]
WC	(Australia) L Ashley (Australia) D Ivanova	3	1
(United States) M Gordon (United States) C Van Nguyen	6	6
(Ukraine) A Bondarenko (United States) A Nefedova	2	1
3	(United States) S Chang (United States) A Mueller	6	6
WC	(United States) R McAdoo (United States) A Parks	6	4	[3]
WC	(United States) S Carrington (United States) A Smith	4	6	[10]
(United States) A Kiick (United States) K Stewart	3	6	[10]
2	(United States) S Marand (Mexico) R Zarazúa	6	1	[7]

Quarterfinals
1	(Belgium) A-S Mestach (United Kingdom) L Robson	6	6
(Italy) C Ferrando (France) S Reix	2	4
(United States) J Failla (United States) K Shaffer	6^{5}	6	[10]
(United States) L Chirico (United States) A Kratzer	7^{7}	2	[6]
(United States) M Gordon (United States) C Van Nguyen	4	1
3	(United States) S Chang (United States) A Mueller	6	6
WC	(United States) S Carrington (United States) A Smith	w/o
(United States) A Kiick (United States) K Stewart

Semifinals
1	(Belgium) A-S Mestach (United Kingdom) L Robson	6	6
(United States) J Failla (United States) K Shaffer	2	2
3	(United States) S Chang (United States) A Mueller	6	6
WC	(United States) S Carrington (United States) A Smith	1	1

Final
1	(Belgium) A-S Mestach (United Kingdom) L Robson	7^{9}	7^{7}
3	(United States) S Chang (United States) A Mueller	6^{7}	6^{2}
