= 2022 Henderson Tennis Open =

Tennis tournament

- Date: 10–16 October 2022
- Edition: 13th
- Category: ITF Women's World Tennis Tour
- Prize money: $60,000
- Surface: Hard / Outdoor
- Location: Las Vegas, United States

Champions

Singles
- (China) Yuan Yue

Doubles
- (United States) Carmen Corley / (United States) Ivana Corley
- Henderson Tennis Open

The 2022 Henderson Tennis Open was a professional tennis tournament played on outdoor hard courts. It was the thirteenth edition of the tournament which was part of the 2022 ITF Women's World Tennis Tour. It took place in Las Vegas, United States between 10 and 16 October 2022.

== Champions ==
=== Singles ===
- (China) Yuan Yue def. Diana Shnaider, 4–6, 6–3, 6–1

=== Doubles ===
- (United States) Carmen Corley / (United States) Ivana Corley def. (Serbia) Katarina Kozarov / Veronica Miroshnichenko, 6–2, 6–0

== Singles main draw entrants ==
=== Seeds ===
Country	Player	Rank^{1}	Seed
HUN	Panna Udvardy	81	1
CHN	Yuan Yue	102	2
SWE	Rebecca Peterson	111	3
USA	Katie Volynets	117	4
USA	Asia Muhammad	162	5
USA	Katrina Scott	184	6
AUS	Astra Sharma	200	7
ARG	Nadia Podoroska	203	8

- ^{1} Rankings are as of 3 October 2022.

=== Other entrants ===
The following players received wildcards into the singles main draw:

- (United States) Raveena Kingsley
- (United States) Rasheeda McAdoo
- (United States) Anna Rogers
- (Belgium) Yanina Wickmayer

The following players received entry from the qualifying draw:

- (United States) Solymar Colling
- (United States) Carmen Corley
- (Chinese Taipei) Hsu Chieh-yu
- (United States) Tori Kinard
- (Serbia) Katarina Kozarov
- Veronica Miroshnichenko
- (Indonesia) Aldila Sutjiadi
- (Sweden) Lisa Zaar
