= Alexandra Mueller =

American tennis player

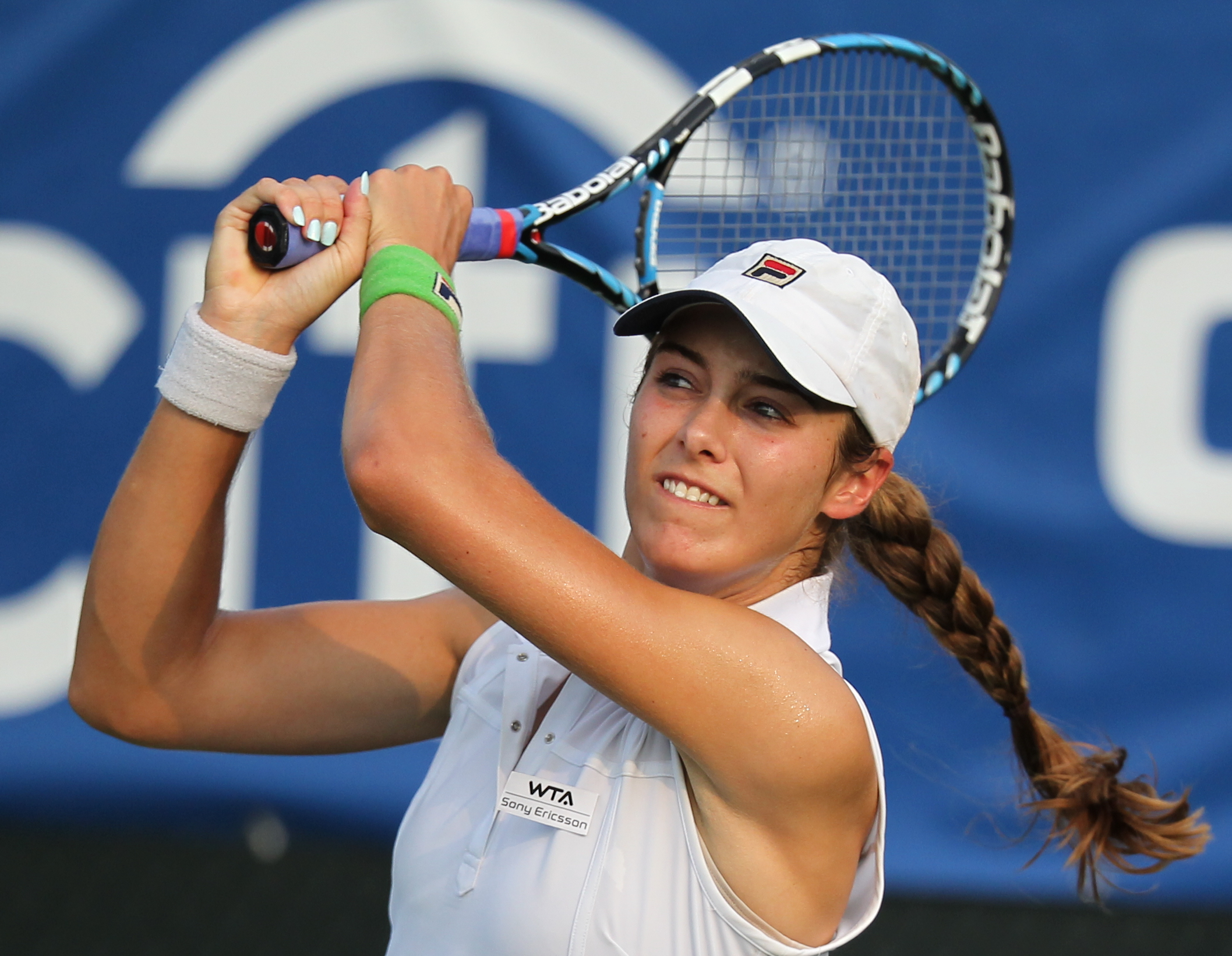
- Country (sports): United States
- Born: February 14, 1988 (age 38) Abington
- Height: 1.88 m (6 ft 2 in)
- Plays: Right-handed (two-handed backhand)
- Coach: Scott Lambdin
- Prize money: $178,902

Singles
- Career record: 259–213
- Career titles: 7 ITF
- Highest ranking: No. 280 (July 6, 2009)

Grand Slam singles results
- US Open: Q2 (2004)

Doubles
- Career record: 236–190
- Career titles: 21 ITF
- Highest ranking: No. 130 (January 28, 2019)

Grand Slam doubles results
- US Open: 1R (2004, 2007)

Alexandra Mueller (born 14 February 1988) is a former professional tennis player from the United States.

In her career, she won seven singles titles and 21 doubles titles on the ITF Women's Circuit. In July 2009, she reached her best WTA singles ranking of 280. In January 2019, she peaked at No. 130 in the WTA doubles rankings.

== ITF Circuit finals ==
Legend
$80,000 tournaments
$50/60,000 tournaments
$25,000 tournaments
$10,000 tournaments

=== Singles: 10 (7 titles, 3 runner-ups) ===
| Result | W–L | Date | Tournament | Tier | Surface | Opponent | Score |
|---|---|---|---|---|---|---|---|
| Win | 1–0 | Jun 2003 | ITF Mont-Tremblant, Canada | 10,000 | Clay | (Canada) Erica Biro | 6–0, 6–2 |
| Win | 2–0 | Mar 2004 | ITF Monterrey, Mexico | 10,000 | Hard | (Argentina) Natalia Garbellotto | 5–7, 6–1, 6–4 |
| Win | 3–0 | Jul 2008 | Waterloo Challenger, Canada | 25,000 | Clay | (Canada) Sharon Fichman | 6–3, 6–3 |
| Win | 4–0 | Jun 2009 | ITF Hilton Head, United States | 10,000 | Hard | (United States) Alison Riske | 6–1, 3–6, 6–3 |
| Win | 5–0 | May 2010 | ITF Landisville, United States | 10,000 | Hard | (United States) Kyle McPhillips | 6–2, 5–7, 6–0 |
| Win | 6–0 | Jun 2011 | ITF Hilton Head, United States | 10,000 | Hard | (Australia) Bojana Bobusic | 6–2, 6–0 |
| Win | 7–0 | Jun 2013 | ITF Buffalo, United States | 10,000 | Clay | (Russia) Alisa Kleybanova | 7–5, 6–4 |
| Loss | 7–1 | Sep 2013 | ITF Amelia Island, United States | 10,000 | Clay | (United States) Tornado Alicia Black | 6–4, 0–6, 0–6 |
| Loss | 7–2 | Oct 2013 | ITF Hilton Head, United States | 10,000 | Clay | (United States) Elizabeth Halbauer | 6–7^{(5)}, 5–7 |
| Loss | 7–3 | Jun 2016 | ITF Bethany Beach, United States | 10,000 | Clay | (United States) Ingrid Neel | 3–6, 3–6 |

=== Doubles: 37 (21 titles, 16 runner-ups) ===
| Result | W–L | Date | Tournament | Tier | Surface | Partner | Opponents | Score |
|---|---|---|---|---|---|---|---|---|
| Win | 1–0 | Jun 2007 | ITF Hilton Head, United States | 10,000 | Hard | (United States) Stacia Fonseca | (Japan) Ryōko Fuda (United States) Mami Inoue | 6–3, 6–2 |
| Loss | 1–1 | Jun 2008 | Waterloo Challenger, Canada | 25,000 | Clay | (United States) Lauren Albanese | (Japan) Akiko Yonemura (Japan) Tomoko Yonemura | 1–6, 6–4, [3–10] |
| Win | 2–1 | Jun 2009 | Waterloo Challenger, Canada | 25,000 | Clay | (United States) Allie Will | (Canada) Heidi El Tabakh (United States) Tetiana Luzhanska | 6–2, 6–1 |
| Loss | 2–2 | Apr 2010 | ITF Charlottesville, US | 50,000 | Hard | (United States) Ahsha Rolle | (United States) Julie Ditty (United States) Carly Gullickson | 4–6, 3–6 |
| Loss | 2–3 | May 2010 | ITF Raleigh, US | 50,000 | Clay | (United States) Ahsha Rolle | (United States) Kristie Ahn (United States) Nicole Gibbs | 3–6, 2–6 |
| Win | 3–3 | May 2010 | ITF Landisville, US | 10,000 | Hard | (United States) Gail Brodsky | (New Zealand) Dianne Hollands (Australia) Tiffany Welford | 4–6, 7–5, [10–2] |
| Win | 4–3 | May 2010 | ITF Sumter, US | 10,000 | Hard | (United States) Ashley Weinhold | (United States) Nicole Melichar (United States) Alexandra Leatu | 6–1, 6–3 |
| Loss | 4–4 | Nov 2010 | Toronto Challenger, Canada | 50,000 | Hard (i) | (United States) Brittany Augustine | (Canada) Sharon Fichman (Canada) Gabriela Dabrowski | 4–6, 0–6 |
| Win | 5–4 | May 2011 | Carson Challenger, US | 50,000 | Hard | (United States) Asia Muhammad | (United States) Christina Fusano (United States) Yasmin Schnack | 6–2, 6–3 |
| Loss | 5–5 | May 2011 | ITF Hilton Head, US | 10,000 | Hard | (United States) Whitney Jones | (United States) Macall Harkins (United States) Amanda McDowell | 3–6, 3–6 |
| Win | 6–5 | Jun 2011 | ITF Boston, US | 50,000 | Hard | (United States) Tetiana Luzhanska | (Canada) Sharon Fichman (Canada) Marie-Ève Pelletier | 7–6^{(3)}, 6–3 |
| Win | 7–5 | Jul 2011 | Waterloo Challenger, Canada | 50,000 | Clay | (United States) Asia Muhammad | (Canada) Eugenie Bouchard (United States) Megan Moulton-Levy | 6–3, 3–6, [10–7] |
| Loss | 7–6 | May 2012 | ITF Raleigh, US | 25,000 | Clay | (United States) Asia Muhammad | (Canada) Gabriela Dabrowski (Canada) Marie-Ève Pelletier | 4–6, 6–4, [5–10] |
| Loss | 7–7 | May 2012 | ITF Landisville, US | 10,000 | Hard | (Canada) Gabriela Dabrowski | (United States) Macall Harkins (Chinese Taipei) Hsu Chieh-yu | 3–6, 4–6 |
| Win | 8–7 | May 2013 | ITF Sumter, US | 10,000 | Hard | (United States) Kristy Frilling | (United States) Jamie Loeb (United States) Sanaz Marand | 6–4, 6–3 |
| Win | 9–7 | May 2013 | ITF Hilton Head, US | 10,000 | Hard | (United States) Kristy Frilling | (United States) Hayley Carter (United States) Josie Kuhlman | 6–3, 6–4 |
| Win | 10–7 | Jun 2013 | ITF Buffalo, US | 10,000 | Clay | (United States) Emily Harman | (Japan) Sachie Ishizu (United States) Denise Starr | 4–6, 6–3, [10–7] |
| Win | 11–7 | Sep 2013 | ITF Amelia Island, US | 10,000 | Clay | (Brazil) Maria Fernanda Alves | (United States) Roxanne Ellison (United States) Sierra Ellison | 7–5, 6–3 |
| Win | 12–7 | Oct 2013 | ITF Hilton Head, US | 10,000 | Clay | (Canada) Jillian O'Neill | (United States) Kristi Boxx (New Zealand) Abigail Guthrie | 6–4, 6–1 |
| Loss | 12–8 | Nov 2013 | ITF Captiva Island, US | 50,000 | Hard | (United States) Julia Boserup | (Canada) Gabriela Dabrowski (United States) Allie Will | 1–6, 2–6 |
| Win | 13–8 | May 2014 | ITF Raleigh, US | 25,000 | Clay | (Chinese Taipei) Hsu Chieh-yu | (United States) Danielle Lao (United States) Keri Wong | 6–3, 6–3 |
| Win | 14–8 | Jun 2014 | ITF Bethany Beach, US | 10,000 | Clay | (United States) Lena Litvak | (United States) Rima Asatrian (United States) Katerina Stewart | 6–4, 6–1 |
| Win | 15–8 | Jun 2014 | ITF Charlotte, US | 10,000 | Clay | (United States) Lena Litvak | (United States) Sophie Chang (United States) Andie Daniell | 6–3, 6–3 |
| Loss | 15–9 | Aug 2014 | ITF Landisville, US | 25,000 | Hard | (United States) Lena Litvak | (United States) Jamie Loeb (United States) Sanaz Marand | 6–7^{(5)}, 1–6 |
| Win | 16–9 | Jun 2015 | ITF Sumter, US | 25,000 | Hard | (United States) Ashley Weinhold | (United States) Jacqueline Cako (United States) Danielle Lao | 5–7, 7–5, [10–6] |
| Loss | 16–10 | Jun 2016 | ITF Buffalo, US | 10,000 | Clay | (United States) Sophie Chang | (United States) Caroline Dolehide (United States) Ingrid Neel | 7–5, 3–6, [6–10] |
| Win | 17–10 | Jun 2016 | ITF Bethany Beach, US | 10,000 | Clay | (United States) Sophie Chang | (Russia) Veronica Miroshnichenko (United States) Sofia Sewing | 6–1, 6–4 |
| Win | 18–10 | Jun 2016 | ITF Evansville, US | 10,000 | Hard | (United States) Sophie Chang | (United States) Brynn Boren (United States) Keri Wong | 6–1, 6–4 |
| Loss | 18–11 | Jul 2016 | Lexington Challenger, US | 50,000 | Hard | (United States) Sophie Chang | (Japan) Hiroko Kuwata (China) Zhu Lin | 0–6, 5–7 |
| Loss | 18–12 | Jun 2017 | ITF Bethany Beach, US | 25,000 | Clay | (United States) Sophie Chang | (United States) Sabrina Santamaria (Papua New Guinea) Abigail Tere-Apisah | 4–6, 0–6 |
| Win | 19–12 | Aug 2017 | ITF Landisville, US | 25,000 | Hard | (United States) Sophie Chang | (Russia) Ksenia Lykina (United Kingdom) Emily Webley-Smith | 4–6, 6–3, [10–5] |
| Loss | 19–13 | Sep 2017 | Las Vegas Open, US | 60,000 | Hard | (United States) Sophie Chang | (Belgium) An-Sophie Mestach (United Kingdom) Laura Robson | 6–7^{(7)}, 6–7^{(2)} |
| Loss | 19–14 | Oct 2017 | ITF Sumter, US | 25,000 | Hard | (United States) Caitlin Whoriskey | (United States) Jessica Pegula (United States) Taylor Townsend | 6–4, 5–7, [5–10] |
| Win | 20–14 | Apr 2018 | Charlottesville Open, US | 80,000 | Clay | (United States) Sophie Chang | (United States) Ashley Kratzer (United States) Whitney Osuigwe | 3–6, 6–4, [10–7] |
| Win | 21–14 | Oct 2018 | ITF Charleston Pro, US | 25,000 | Clay | (United States) Sophie Chang | (Chinese Taipei) Hsu Chieh-yu (Romania) Gabriela Talabă | 6–4, 6–4 |
| Loss | 21–15 | Nov 2018 | Las Vegas Open, US | 80,000 | Hard | (United States) Sophie Chang | (United States) Asia Muhammad (United States) Maria Sanchez | 3–6, 4–6 |
| Loss | 21–16 | Nov 2019 | Las Vegas Open, US | 60,000 | Hard | (United States) Sophie Chang | (Luxembourg) Mandy Minella (Belarus) Olga Govortsova | 3–6, 4–6 |
