= Henderson Tennis Open =

- 2022 Henderson Tennis Open

ITF Women's Tour
- Event name: Henderson Tennis Open (2019–2022); Red Rock Pro Open (2014–2018); Party Rock Open (2012–2013); Lexus of Las Vegas Open (2009–2011)
- Location: Henderson, Las Vegas, United States
- Venue: Whitney Mesa Tennis Complex
- Category: ITF Women's Circuit
- Surface: Hard
- Draw: 32S/32Q/16D
- Prize money: $60,000
- Website: Official website

The Henderson Tennis Open is a tournament for professional female tennis players played on outdoor hard courts. The event is classified as a $60,000 ITF Women's Circuit tournament and also part of the USTA Pro Circuit calendar. It has been held in Las Vegas, United States, since 2009 and played at the Red Rock Country Club. It was previously played at the Darling Tennis Center, the former site of the ATP Tennis Channel Open.

The tournament was founded by Tyler Weekes of Courtthink, LLC, who also serves as the co-tournament director along with Jordan Butler, a Las Vegas attorney and a WTA-certified player agent under his agency Agent Atleta.

In the summer of 2012, Weekes met Redfoo (a.k.a. Stefan Gordy) of the hit techno group LMFAO and gave him a tennis lesson at the Cosmopolitan of Las Vegas. Weekes expressed concern that his tournament was in need of a new title sponsor and soon after Redfoo agreed to have his Party Rock line of clothing become the new title sponsor of the event.

The Party Rock Open was held at Darling Tennis Center and featured a Cox Kids Day on the opening day of the tournament that was attended by more than 500 local Las Vegas children, as well as Redfoo. The highlight of the tournament came on semifinal Saturday night when Redfoo participated in a flash mob and was joined by hundreds of kids on court before the evening session. He sang two of his hit songs, including Party Rock Anthem and Sexy and I Know It.

The Party Rock Open is played the last week of September and was won in 2012 by 19-year-old American Lauren Davis, who beat fellow teenager Shelby Rogers in the final.

In 2014, the tournament ended its two-year association with Redfoo and Party Rock Open, which also featured the Party Rock crew and a full-time Deejay on Center Court. As a result, the tournament name changed to the Red Rock Pro Open and the site of the tournament moved back to the Red Rock Country Club, where it was originally held between 2009 and 2011 as the Lexus of Las Vegas Open.

In 2019, the venue of the tournament was moved to the Dragonridge Country Club Tennis and Athletic Center in Henderson and subsequently the name of the tournament was changed to the Henderson Tennis Open.

In 2021, the tournament was moved to the Whitney Mesa Tennis Complex.

== Past finals ==
=== Singles ===
Year	Champion	Runner-up	Score
2023	tournament cancelled		
2022	(China) Yuan Yue	Diana Shnaider	4–6, 6–3, 6–1
2021	(United States) Emina Bektas	(Japan) Lily Miyazaki	6–1, 6–1
2020	tournament cancelled due to the COVID-19 pandemic		
2019	(Japan) Mayo Hibi	(Ukraine) Anhelina Kalinina	6–2, 5–7, 6–2
2018	(Switzerland) Belinda Bencic	(United States) Nicole Gibbs	7–5, 6–1
2017	(Bulgaria) Sesil Karatantcheva	(Bulgaria) Elitsa Kostova	6–4, 4–6, 7–5
2016	(Belgium) Alison Van Uytvanck	(United States) Sofia Kenin	3–6, 7–6^{(7–4)}, 6–2
2015	(Netherlands) Michaëlla Krajicek	(United States) Shelby Rogers	6–3, 6–1
2014	(United States) Madison Brengle	(Portugal) Michelle Larcher de Brito	6–1, 6–4
2013	(United States) Melanie Oudin	(United States) CoCo Vandeweghe	5–7, 6–3, 6–3
2012	(United States) Lauren Davis	(United States) Shelby Rogers	6–7^{(5–7)}, 6–2, 6–2
2011	(Italy) Romina Oprandi	(United States) Alexa Glatch	6–7^{(2–7)}, 6–3, 7–6^{(7–4)}
2010	(United States) Varvara Lepchenko	(Romania) Sorana Cîrstea	6–2, 6–2
2009	(Russia) Regina Kulikova	(Hungary) Anikó Kapros	6–2, 6–2

=== Doubles ===
Year	Champions	Runners-up	Score
2023	tournament cancelled		
2022	(United States) Carmen Corley (United States) Ivana Corley	(Serbia) Katarina Kozarov; Veronika Miroshnichenko	6–2, 6–0
2021	(United States) Quinn Gleason (Slovakia) Tereza Mihalíková	(United States) Emina Bektas (United Kingdom) Tara Moore	7–6^{(7–5)}, 7–5
2020	tournament cancelled due to the COVID-19 pandemic		
2019	(Belarus) Olga Govortsova (Luxembourg) Mandy Minella	(United States) Sophie Chang (United States) Alexandra Mueller	6–3, 6–4
2018	(United States) Asia Muhammad (United States) Maria Sanchez	(United States) Sophie Chang (United States) Alexandra Mueller	6–3, 6–4
2017	(Belgium) An-Sophie Mestach (United Kingdom) Laura Robson	(United States) Sophie Chang (United States) Alexandra Mueller	7–6^{(9–7)}, 7–6^{(7–2)}
2016	(Netherlands) Michaëlla Krajicek (United States) Maria Sanchez	(United States) Jamie Loeb (South Africa) Chanel Simmonds	7–5, 6–1
2015	(United States) Julia Boserup (United States) Nicole Gibbs	(Brazil) Paula Cristina Gonçalves (United States) Sanaz Marand	6–3, 6–4
2014	(Paraguay) Verónica Cepede Royg (Argentina) María Irigoyen	(United States) Asia Muhammad (United States) Maria Sanchez	6–3, 5–7, [11–9]
2013	(Austria) Tamira Paszek (United States) CoCo Vandeweghe	(United States) Denise Mureşan (United States) Caitlin Whoriskey	6–4, 6–2
2012	(Australia) Anastasia Rodionova (Russia) Arina Rodionova	(Russia) Elena Bovina (Romania) Edina Gallovits-Hall	6–2, 2–6, [10–6]
2011	(United States) Alexa Glatch (United States) Mashona Washington	(United States) Varvara Lepchenko (United States) Melanie Oudin	6–4, 6–2
2010	(United States) Lindsay Lee-Waters (United States) Megan Moulton-Levy	(United States) Irina Falconi (United States) Maria Sanchez	1–6, 7–5, [10–4]
2009	(Hungary) Anikó Kapros (Argentina) Agustina Lepore	(United States) Kimberly Couts (United States) Lindsay Lee-Waters	6–2, 7–5
