= Sophie Chang (tennis) =

American tennis player

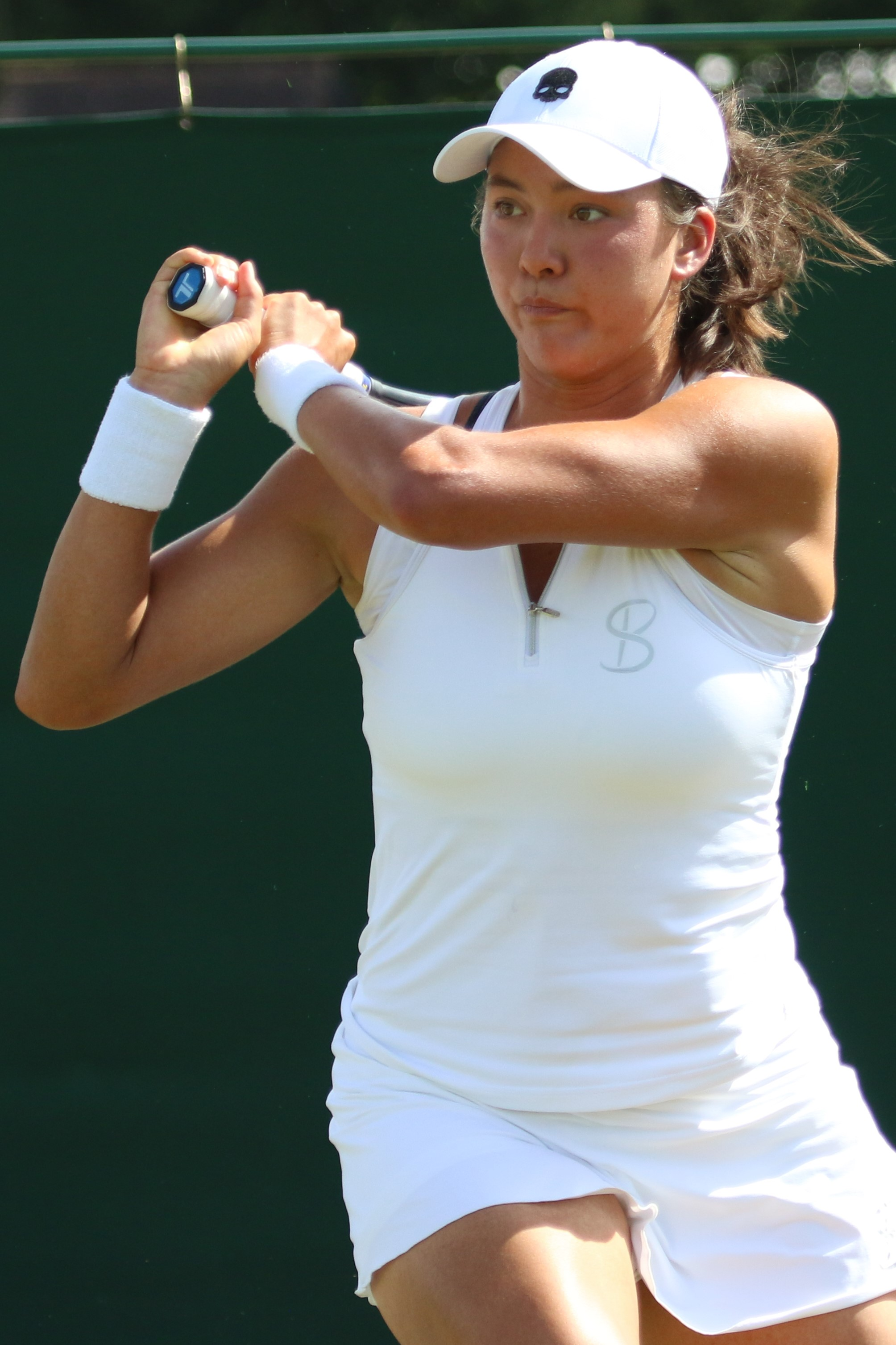
- Chang at the 2022 Wimbledon Championships
- Country (sports): United States
- Born: May 28, 1997 (age 29) Havre de Grace, Maryland
- Height: 1.85 m (6 ft 1 in)
- Turned pro: 2015
- Plays: Right (two-handed backhand)
- Prize money: $499,938

Singles
- Career record: 268–273
- Career titles: 0 WTA, 4 ITF
- Highest ranking: No. 217 (January 9, 2023)

Grand Slam singles results
- Australian Open: Q3 (2023)
- Wimbledon: Q2 (2022)
- US Open: Q1 (2018, 2024)

Doubles
- Career record: 281–203
- Career titles: 1 WTA, 25 ITF
- Highest ranking: No. 59 (September 26, 2022)

Grand Slam doubles results
- Australian Open: 1R (2023, 2024)
- French Open: 1R (2023)
- Wimbledon: 1R (2023)
- US Open: 3R (2023)

Sophie Chang (born May 28, 1997) is an American inactive tennis player.

Chang has career-high WTA rankings of No. 217 in singles, reached in January 2023, and No. 59 in doubles, achieved September 2022. She has won one WTA Tour doubles title with Angela Kulikov in July 2022. On the ITF Circuit, Chang has won 25 doubles titles (five of them with Alexandra Mueller) and four singles titles.

== Career overview ==
She made her WTA Tour main-draw debut at the 2017 Washington Open, in the doubles draw, partnering with Alexandra Mueller. She has won one doubles title on the WTA Tour at the 2022 Hamburg European Open, partnering with Angela Kulikov. Her first tour-level singles match was at the 2022 Charleston Open.

== Grand Slam performance timelines ==
Key
W	F	SF	QF	#R	RR	Q#	DNQ	A	NH

(W) winner; (F) finalist; (SF) semifinalist; (QF) quarterfinalist; (#R) rounds 4, 3, 2, 1; (RR) round-robin stage; (Q#) qualification round; (DNQ) did not qualify; (A) absent; (NH) not held; (SR) strike rate (events won / competed); (W–L) win–loss record.
To avoid confusion and double counting, these charts are updated at the conclusion of a tournament or when the player's participation has ended.

=== Doubles ===
Current through the 2024 US Open.

Tournament	2017	2018	2019	2020	2021	2022	2023	2024	SR	W–L
Grand Slam tournaments
Australian Open	A	A	A	A	A	A	1R	1R	0 / 2	0–2
French Open	A	A	A	A	A	A	1R	A	0 / 1	0–1
Wimbledon	A	A	A	NH	A	A	1R	A	0 / 1	0–1
US Open	A	A	A	A	A	2R	3R	A	0 / 2	3–2
Win–loss	0–0	0–0	0–0	0–0	0–0	1–1	2–4	0–1	0 / 6	3–6
WTA 1000 tournaments
Guadalajara Open	NH					1R	A	A	0 / 1	0–1
Career statistics
Tournaments	1	2	0	0	1	5	7	0	Career total: 16	
Overall win-loss	0–1	1–2	0–0	0–0	0–1	6–4	3–7	0–0	1 / 16	10–15

== WTA Tour finals ==
=== Doubles: 1 (title) ===
Legend WTA 250 (1–0)	Finals by surface Clay (1–0)

Result	Date	Tournament	Tier	Surface	Partner	Opponents	Score
Win	Jul 2022	Hamburg European Open, Germany	WTA 250	Clay	(United States) Angela Kulikov	(Japan) Miyu Kato (Indonesia) Aldila Sutjiadi	6–3, 4–6, [10–6]

== WTA 125 finals ==
=== Doubles: 1 (runner-up) ===
Result	Date	Tournament	Surface	Partner	Opponents	Score
Loss	Nov 2023	Midland Tennis Classic, United States	Hard (i)	(United States) Ashley Lahey	(United States) Hailey Baptiste (United States) Whitney Osuigwe	6–2, 2–6, [1–10]

== ITF Circuit finals ==
=== Singles: 8 (4 titles, 4 runner-ups) ===
Legend W75 tournaments (1–1) W25/35 tournaments (2–3) W15 tournaments (1–0)	Finals by surface Hard (2–1) Clay (2–3)

Result	W–L	Date	Tournament	Tier	Surface	Opponent	Score
Loss	0–1	Apr 2017	ITF Jackson, United States	25,000	Clay	(Austria) Barbara Haas	4–6, 7–6^{(3)}, 4–6
Win	1–1	Mar 2018	ITF Orlando, United States	15,000	Clay	(Australia) Astra Sharma	6–3, 7–6^{(6)}
Loss	1–2	May 2018	Osprey Challenger, United States	25,000	Clay	(Israel) Deniz Khazaniuk	4–6, 6–4, [6–10]
Win	2–2	Jan 2022	ITF Vero Beach, United States	W25	Clay	(Belarus) Vera Lapko	6–1, 1–6, 6–2
Win	3–2	Jun 2022	Sumter Pro Open, United States	W25	Hard	(United States) Hanna Chang	6–2, 4–6, 7–6^{(5)}
Loss	3–3	Feb 2024	ITF Wesley Chapel, United States	W35	Clay	(Switzerland) Leonie Küng	4–6, 6–3, 3–6
Loss	3–4	Jun 2024	Sumter Pro Open, United States	W75	Hard	(Canada) Carson Branstine	6–7^{(6)}, 7–6^{(6)}, 1–6
Win	4–4	Jul 2024	Evansville Classic, United States	W75	Hard	(United States) Mary Stoiana	4–6, 7–6^{(5)}, 6–3

=== Doubles: 43 (25 titles, 18 runner-ups) ===
Legend W100 tournaments (6–1) W80 tournaments (1–1) W60/75 tournaments (9–7) W50 tournaments (0–1) W25 tournaments (5–5) W10 tournaments (4–3)	Finals by surface Hard (15–8) Clay (9–10) Grass (1–0)

Result	W–L	Date	Tournament	Tier	Surface	Partner	Opponents	Score
Win	1–0	May 2014	ITF Sumter, United States	10,000	Hard	(United States) Andie Daniell	(Canada) Sonja Molnar (United States) Caitlin Whoriskey	6–1, 6–3
Loss	1–1	Jun 2014	ITF Charlotte, US	10,000	Clay	(United States) Andie Daniell	(United States) Lena Litvak (United States) Alexandra Mueller	3–6, 3–6
Loss	1–2	Sep 2014	ITF Amelia Island, US	10,000	Clay	(United States) Andie Daniell	(Brazil) Maria Fernanda Alves (United States) Keri Wong	6–7^{(6)}, 6–7^{(4)}
Win	2–2	Jun 2015	ITF Bethany Beach, US	10,000	Clay	(United States) Andie Daniell	(Australia) Ellen Perez (Australia) Belinda Woolcock	6–4, 6–1
Loss	2–3	Mar 2016	ITF Naples, US	25,000	Clay	(Netherlands) Quirine Lemoine	(Russia) Valeriya Solovyeva (Ukraine) Maryna Zanevska	5–7, 0–6
Loss	2–4	Apr 2016	ITF Pelham, US	25,000	Clay	(United States) Caitlin Whoriskey	(United States) Asia Muhammad (United States) Taylor Townsend	2–6, 3–6
Loss	2–5	May 2016	ITF Naples, US	25,000	Clay	(Mexico) Renata Zarazúa	(Brazil) Gabriela Cé (Poland) Justyna Jegiołka	1–6, 2–6
Loss	2–6	Jun 2016	ITF Buffalo, US	10,000	Clay	(United States) Alexandra Mueller	(United States) Caroline Dolehide (United States) Ingrid Neel	7–5, 3–6, [6–10]
Win	3–6	Jun 2016	ITF Bethany Beach, US	10,000	Clay	(United States) Alexandra Mueller	(Russia) Veronika Miroshnichenko (United States) Sofia Sewing	6–1, 6–4
Win	4–6	Jun 2016	ITF Evansville, US	10,000	Hard	(United States) Alexandra Mueller	(United States) Brynn Boren (United States) Keri Wong	6–1, 6–4
Loss	4–7	Jul 2016	Lexington Challenger, US	50,000	Hard	(United States) Alexandra Mueller	(Japan) Hiroko Kuwata (China) Zhu Lin	0–6, 5–7
Win	5–7	Jan 2017	ITF Orlando Pro, US	25,000	Hard	(United States) Madeleine Kobelt	(Poland) Paula Kania (Poland) Katarzyna Piter	6–3, 3–6, [10–6]
Loss	5–8	May 2017	ITF Naples, US	25,000	Clay	(Norway) Ulrikke Eikeri	(United States) Emina Bektas (Chile) Alexa Guarachi	3–6, 1–6
Loss	5–9	Jun 2017	ITF Bethany Beach, US	25,000	Clay	(United States) Alexandra Mueller	(United States) Sabrina Santamaria (Papua New Guinea) Abigail Tere-Apisah	4–6, 0–6
Win	6–9	Aug 2017	ITF Landisville, US	25,000	Hard	(United States) Alexandra Mueller	(Russia) Ksenia Lykina (United Kingdom) Emily Webley-Smith	4–6, 6–3, [10–5]
Loss	6–10	Sep 2017	Las Vegas Open, US	60,000	Hard	(United States) Alexandra Mueller	(Belgium) An-Sophie Mestach (United Kingdom) Laura Robson	6–7^{(7)}, 6–7^{(2)}
Win	7–10	Apr 2018	Charlottesville Open, US	80,000	Clay	(United States) Alexandra Mueller	(United States) Ashley Kratzer (United States) Whitney Osuigwe	3–6, 6–4, [10–7]
Win	8–10	Oct 2018	ITF Charleston Pro, US	25,000	Clay	(United States) Alexandra Mueller	(Chinese Taipei) Hsu Chieh-yu (Romania) Gabriela Talabă	6–4, 6–4
Loss	8–11	Nov 2018	Las Vegas Open, US	80,000	Hard	(United States) Alexandra Mueller	(United States) Asia Muhammad (United States) Maria Sanchez	3–6, 4–6
Loss	8–12	Nov 2019	Las Vegas Open, US	W60	Hard	(United States) Alexandra Mueller	(Luxembourg) Mandy Minella (Belarus) Olga Govortsova	3–6, 4–6
Win	9–12	Sep 2021	ITF Fort Worth, US	W25	Hard	(United States) Amy Zhu	(United States) Rasheeda McAdoo (Australia) Ivana Popovic	4–6, 6–3, [10–8]
Win	10–12	Oct 2021	Berkeley Tennis Challenge, US	W60	Hard	(United States) Angela Kulikov	(Chinese Taipei) Liang En-shuo (China) Lu Jiajing	6–4, 6–3
Win	11–12	Jan 2022	ITF Vero Beach, US	W25	Clay	(United States) Allie Kiick	(United States) Anna Rogers (United States) Christina Rosca	6–3, 6–3
Win	12–12	Feb 2022	Georgia's Rome Open, US	W60	Hard (i)	(United States) Angela Kulikov	(United States) Emina Bektas (United Kingdom) Tara Moore	6–3, 6–7^{(2)}, [10–7]
Win	13–12	Apr 2022	Clay Court Championships, US	W100	Clay	(United States) Angela Kulikov	(Italy) Lucrezia Stefanini (Romania) Irina Bara	6–4, 3–6, [10–8]
Win	14–12	Apr 2022	Charlottesville Open, US (2)	W60	Clay	(United States) Angela Kulikov	(Greece) Valentini Grammatikopoulou (United States) Alycia Parks	2–6, 6–3, [10–4]
Loss	14–13	May 2022	ITF Charleston Pro, US	W100	Clay	(United States) Angela Kulikov	(Poland) Katarzyna Kawa (Indonesia) Aldila Sutjiadi	1–6, 4–6
Win	15–13	May 2022	ITF Orlando Pro, US (2)	W60	Hard	(United States) Angela Kulikov	(United States) Hanna Chang (United States) Elizabeth Mandlik	6–3, 2–6, [10–6]
Win	16–13	Aug 2022	Landisville Tennis Challenge, US	W100	Hard	(Kazakhstan) Anna Danilina	(South Korea) Han Na-lae (South Korea) Jang Su-jeong	2–6, 7–6^{(4)}, [11–9]
Loss	16–14	Oct 2022	Templeton Open, US	W60	Hard	(Poland) Katarzyna Kawa	(Japan) Nao Hibino (United States) Sabrina Santamaria	4–6, 6–7^{(4)}
Win	17–14	Apr 2023	ITF Charleston Pro, US	W100	Clay	(United States) Angela Kulikov	(United States) Ashlyn Krueger (United States) Robin Montgomery	6–3, 6–4
Win	18–14	Apr 2023	Charlottesville Open, US (3)	W60	Clay	(China) Yuan Yue	(Japan) Nao Hibino (Hungary) Fanny Stollár	6–3, 6–3
Loss	18–15	Apr 2023	ITF Naples, US	W60	Clay	(United States) Angela Kulikov	(Australia) Astra Sharma (United States) Christina Rosca	1–6, 6–7^{(4)}
Win	19–15	Jun 2023	Surbiton Trophy, UK	W100	Grass	(Belgium) Yanina Wickmayer	(United Kingdom) Alicia Barnett (United Kingdom) Olivia Nicholls	6–4, 6–1
Win	20–15	Jul 2023	Dallas Summer Series, US	W60	Hard (i)	(United States) Ashley Lahey	(United States) Jamie Loeb (United States) Makenna Jones	6–2, 6–2
Win	21–15	Aug 2023	Landisville Challenge, US (2)	W100	Hard	(Ukraine) Yulia Starodubtseva	(Australia) Olivia Gadecki (Japan) Mai Hontama	w/o
Loss	21–16	Jun 2024	Sumter Pro Open, US	W75	Hard	(United States) Dalayna Hewitt	(Spain) Alicia Herrero Liñana (Argentina) Melany Krywoj	3–6, 3–6
Win	22–16	Jun 2024	Guimarães Ladies Open, Portugal	W75	Hard	(United States) Rasheeda McAdoo	(Portugal) Francisca Jorge (Portugal) Matilde Jorge	7–6^{(6)}, 6–7^{(2)}, [10–5]
Loss	22–17	Jun 2024	ITF Palma del Río, Spain	W50	Hard	(India) Rutuja Bhosale	(Poland) Martyna Kubka (Belgium) Lara Salden	2–6, 1–6
Win	23–17	Sep 2024	Templeton Open, US	W75	Hard	(United States) Rasheeda McAdoo	(United States) Carmen Corley (Canada) Rebecca Marino	1–6, 6–2, [10–4]
Loss	23–18	Oct 2024	Edmond Open, US	W75	Hard	(United States) Rasheeda McAdoo	(United States) Kayla Day (Australia) Jaimee Fourlis	5–7, 5–7
Win	24–18	Oct 2024	Tennis Classic of Macon, US	W100	Hard	(Poland) Katarzyna Kawa	(Brazil) Ingrid Martins (United States) Quinn Gleason	7–5, 6–4
Win	25–18	Jan 2025	Georgia's Rome Open, US	W75	Hard (i)	(United States) Angela Kulikov	(United States) Whitney Osuigwe (Netherlands) Eva Vedder	7–6^{(3)}, 6–4
