= 2016 ITF Women's Circuit (July–September) =

The 2016 ITF Women's Circuit is the 2016 edition of the second-tier tour for women's professional tennis. It is organised by the International Tennis Federation and is a tier below the WTA Tour. The ITF Women's Circuit includes tournaments with prize money ranging from $10,000 up to $100,000.

== Key ==
Category
$100,000 tournaments
$75,000 tournaments
$50,000 tournaments
$25,000 tournaments
$10,000 tournaments

== Month ==
=== July ===
Week of	Tournament	Winner	Runners-up	Semifinalists	Quarterfinalists
July 4	Lorraine Open 88; Contrexéville, France; Clay $100,000; Singles – Doubles	(France) Pauline Parmentier; 6–1, 6–1	(France) Océane Dodin	(Netherlands) Cindy Burger (France) Amandine Hesse	(France) Myrtille Georges (Japan) Misa Eguchi (Germany) Tamara Korpatsch (Greece) Maria Sakkari
July 4	Lorraine Open 88; Contrexéville, France; Clay $100,000; Singles – Doubles	(Netherlands) Cindy Burger (Spain) Laura Pous Tió; 6–1, 6–3	(United States) Nicole Melichar (Czech Republic) Renata Voráčová	(Netherlands) Cindy Burger (France) Amandine Hesse	(France) Myrtille Georges (Japan) Misa Eguchi (Germany) Tamara Korpatsch (Greece) Maria Sakkari
July 4	Europe Tennis Center Ladies Open; Budapest, Hungary; Clay $100,000; Singles – Doubles	(Bulgaria) Elitsa Kostova; 6–0, 7–6^{(7–3)}	(Bulgaria) Viktoriya Tomova	(Hungary) Fanny Stollár (Romania) Nicoleta Dascălu	(Georgia (country)) Ekaterine Gorgodze (Serbia) Jovana Jakšić (Sweden) Rebecca Peterson (Romania) Cristina Dinu
July 4	Europe Tennis Center Ladies Open; Budapest, Hungary; Clay $100,000; Singles – Doubles	(Bosnia and Herzegovina) Ema Burgić Bucko (Spain) Georgina García Pérez; 6–4, 2–6, [12–10]	(Czech Republic) Lenka Kunčíková (Czech Republic) Karolína Stuchlá	(Hungary) Fanny Stollár (Romania) Nicoleta Dascălu	(Georgia (country)) Ekaterine Gorgodze (Serbia) Jovana Jakšić (Sweden) Rebecca Peterson (Romania) Cristina Dinu
July 4	Reinert Open; Versmold, Germany; Clay $50,000; Singles – Doubles	(Germany) Antonia Lottner; 3–6, 7–5, 6–3	(Czech Republic) Tereza Smitková	(Czech Republic) Karolína Muchová (Romania) Sorana Cîrstea	(Serbia) Nina Stojanović (Russia) Irina Khromacheva (Turkey) İpek Soylu (Netherlands) Lesley Kerkhove
July 4	Reinert Open; Versmold, Germany; Clay $50,000; Singles – Doubles	(Russia) Natela Dzalamidze (Ukraine) Valeriya Strakhova; 6–2, 6–1	(Japan) Kanae Hisami (Japan) Kotomi Takahata	(Czech Republic) Karolína Muchová (Romania) Sorana Cîrstea	(Serbia) Nina Stojanović (Russia) Irina Khromacheva (Turkey) İpek Soylu (Netherlands) Lesley Kerkhove
July 4	Yuxi, China; Hard $25,000; Singles and doubles draws	(South Korea) Han Na-lae; 5–7, 6–1, 6–3	(China) Lu Jiaxi	(China) Liu Fangzhou (China) Wei Zhanlan	(China) Sun Xuliu (China) Gai Ao (China) Zhang Yuxuan (Uzbekistan) Nigina Abduraimova
July 4	Yuxi, China; Hard $25,000; Singles and doubles draws	(China) Jiang Xinyu (China) Tang Qianhui; 6–2, 3–6, [10–5]	(China) Gai Ao (China) Guo Shanshan	(China) Liu Fangzhou (China) Wei Zhanlan	(China) Sun Xuliu (China) Gai Ao (China) Zhang Yuxuan (Uzbekistan) Nigina Abduraimova
July 4	Turin, Italy; Clay $25,000; Singles and doubles draws	(Slovenia) Dalila Jakupović; 7–5, 6–4	(North Macedonia) Lina Gjorcheska	(Italy) Anastasia Grymalska (Paraguay) Montserrat González	(Switzerland) Lisa Sabino (Italy) Alberta Brianti (Georgia (country)) Sofia Shapatava (Spain) Irene Burillo Escorihuela
July 4	Turin, Italy; Clay $25,000; Singles and doubles draws	(North Macedonia) Lina Gjorcheska (Slovenia) Dalila Jakupović; 6–3, 6–3	(Italy) Alice Matteucci (Georgia (country)) Sofia Shapatava	(Italy) Anastasia Grymalska (Paraguay) Montserrat González	(Switzerland) Lisa Sabino (Italy) Alberta Brianti (Georgia (country)) Sofia Shapatava (Spain) Irene Burillo Escorihuela
July 4	Brussels, Belgium; Clay $10,000; Singles and doubles draws	(Australia) Ellen Perez; 6–2, 6–3	(Belgium) Kimberley Zimmermann	(France) Emmanuelle Girard (France) Manon Péral	(Switzerland) Nina Stadler (Germany) Vivian Wolff (Belgium) Eliessa Vanlangendonck (Belgium) Hélène Scholsen
July 4	Brussels, Belgium; Clay $10,000; Singles and doubles draws	(Brazil) Carolina Alves (Australia) Ellen Perez; 6–2, 6–3	(Switzerland) Karin Kennel (Belgium) Hélène Scholsen	(France) Emmanuelle Girard (France) Manon Péral	(Switzerland) Nina Stadler (Germany) Vivian Wolff (Belgium) Eliessa Vanlangendonck (Belgium) Hélène Scholsen
July 4	Sharm el-Sheikh, Egypt; Hard $10,000; Singles and doubles draws	(Greece) Eleni Kordolaimi; 7–6^{(8–6)}, 6–3	(Romania) Ana Bianca Mihăilă	(France) Clémence Fayol (United States) Shelby Talcott	(Hungary) Naomi Totka (Russia) Valeriya Yushchenko (Romania) Ioana Pietroiu (India) Snehadevi Reddy
July 4	Sharm el-Sheikh, Egypt; Hard $10,000; Singles and doubles draws	(Greece) Eleni Kordolaimi (Ukraine) Kateryna Sliusar; 6–2, 7–5	(United Kingdom) Mirabelle Njoze (India) Shweta Chandra Rana	(France) Clémence Fayol (United States) Shelby Talcott	(Hungary) Naomi Totka (Russia) Valeriya Yushchenko (Romania) Ioana Pietroiu (India) Snehadevi Reddy
July 4	Amstelveen, Netherlands; Clay $10,000; Singles and doubles draws	(Netherlands) Bibiane Weijers; 6–7^{(4–7)}, 6–4, 6–3	(Netherlands) Arianne Hartono	(United States) Frances Altick (Belarus) Sviatlana Pirazhenka	(Netherlands) Dewi Dijkman (Germany) Julia Kimmelmann (Netherlands) Mandy Wagemaker (United States) Dasha Ivanova
July 4	Amstelveen, Netherlands; Clay $10,000; Singles and doubles draws	(United States) Frances Altick (Australia) Astra Sharma; 6–4, 6–2	(Netherlands) Erika Vogelsang (Netherlands) Mandy Wagemaker	(United States) Frances Altick (Belarus) Sviatlana Pirazhenka	(Netherlands) Dewi Dijkman (Germany) Julia Kimmelmann (Netherlands) Mandy Wagemaker (United States) Dasha Ivanova
July 4	Lisbon, Portugal; Hard $10,000; Singles and doubles draws	(Spain) María José Luque Moreno; 6–2, 6–3	(Finland) Emma Laine	(United Kingdom) Samantha Murray (Portugal) Maria João Koehler	(Latvia) Laura Gulbe (Cambodia) Andrea Ka (France) Léa Tholey (Spain) Arabela Fernández Rabener
July 4	Lisbon, Portugal; Hard $10,000; Singles and doubles draws	(Finland) Emma Laine (United Kingdom) Samantha Murray; 7–6^{(7–5)}, 6–3	(France) Mathilde Armitano (Portugal) Inês Murta	(United Kingdom) Samantha Murray (Portugal) Maria João Koehler	(Latvia) Laura Gulbe (Cambodia) Andrea Ka (France) Léa Tholey (Spain) Arabela Fernández Rabener
July 4	Iași, Romania; Clay $10,000; Singles and doubles draws	(Moldova) Alexandra Perper; 6–3, 6–0	(Italy) Giorgia Marchetti	(Moldova) Anastasia Vdovenco (Romania) Irina Fetecău	(Romania) Gabriela Talabă (Czech Republic) Natálie Cváčková (Romania) Simona Ionescu (Romania) Andreea Prisăcariu
July 4	Iași, Romania; Clay $10,000; Singles and doubles draws	(Romania) Elena-Teodora Cadar (Italy) Giorgia Marchetti; 7–6^{(9–7)}, 6–7^{(1–7)}, [11–9]	(France) Kassandra Davesne (Romania) Irina Fetecău	(Moldova) Anastasia Vdovenco (Romania) Irina Fetecău	(Romania) Gabriela Talabă (Czech Republic) Natálie Cváčková (Romania) Simona Ionescu (Romania) Andreea Prisăcariu
July 4	Niš, Serbia; Clay $10,000; Singles and doubles draws	(Slovakia) Viktória Kužmová; 6–1, 6–2	(Austria) Mira Antonitsch	(Slovakia) Petra Uberalová (Serbia) Tamara Čurović	(Russia) Amina Anshba (Serbia) Natalija Kostić (Ukraine) Marianna Zakarlyuk (Bulgaria) Ani Vangelova
July 4	Niš, Serbia; Clay $10,000; Singles and doubles draws	(Russia) Amina Anshba (Russia) Angelina Gabueva; 7–5, 7–5	(Serbia) Tamara Čurović (Serbia) Natalija Kostić	(Slovakia) Petra Uberalová (Serbia) Tamara Čurović	(Russia) Amina Anshba (Serbia) Natalija Kostić (Ukraine) Marianna Zakarlyuk (Bulgaria) Ani Vangelova
July 4	Gimcheon, South Korea; Hard $10,000; Singles and doubles draws	(China) Wang Yan; 4–6, 6–2, 6–4	(South Korea) Park Sang-hee	(South Korea) Yea Hyo-jung (Japan) Mai Minokoshi	(South Korea) Hong Seung-yeon (South Korea) Kim Da-bin (Japan) Mana Ayukawa (Japan) Risa Ushijima
July 4	Gimcheon, South Korea; Hard $10,000; Singles and doubles draws	(Hong Kong) Katherine Ip (Indonesia) Jessy Rompies; 6–3, 6–3	(South Korea) Kim Hae-sung (South Korea) Kim Mi-ok	(South Korea) Yea Hyo-jung (Japan) Mai Minokoshi	(South Korea) Hong Seung-yeon (South Korea) Kim Da-bin (Japan) Mana Ayukawa (Japan) Risa Ushijima
July 4	Getxo, Spain; Clay $10,000; Singles and doubles draws	(France) Jessika Ponchet; 4–6, 6–2, 6–1	(Romania) Ioana Loredana Roșca	(Ecuador) Charlotte Römer (Greece) Despina Papamichail	(Ukraine) Oleksandra Korashvili (Spain) Cristina Bucșa (Argentina) Carla Lucero (Germany) Hanna Landener
July 4	Getxo, Spain; Clay $10,000; Singles and doubles draws	(Ukraine) Oleksandra Korashvili (Romania) Ioana Loredana Roșca; 6–0, 6–3	(Argentina) Carla Lucero (France) Jessika Ponchet	(Ecuador) Charlotte Römer (Greece) Despina Papamichail	(Ukraine) Oleksandra Korashvili (Spain) Cristina Bucșa (Argentina) Carla Lucero (Germany) Hanna Landener
July 4	Buca, Turkey; Hard $10,000; Singles and doubles draws	(Montenegro) Ana Veselinović; 6–3, 6–4	(Venezuela) Aymet Uzcátegui	(Israel) Vlada Ekshibarova (Slovakia) Zuzana Zlochová	(Russia) Daria Lodikova (Turkey) Müge Topsel (Bulgaria) Petia Arshinkova (Kyrgyzstan) Ksenia Palkina Ulukan
July 4	Buca, Turkey; Hard $10,000; Singles and doubles draws	(Israel) Vlada Ekshibarova (Montenegro) Ana Veselinović; 6–3, 6–3	(Russia) Daria Lodikova (Sweden) Anette Munozova	(Israel) Vlada Ekshibarova (Slovakia) Zuzana Zlochová	(Russia) Daria Lodikova (Turkey) Müge Topsel (Bulgaria) Petia Arshinkova (Kyrgyzstan) Ksenia Palkina Ulukan
July 11	ITS Cup; Olomouc, Czech Republic; Clay $50,000; Singles – Doubles	(Russia) Elizaveta Kulichkova; 4–6, 6–2, 6–1	(Russia) Ekaterina Alexandrova	(Italy) Anastasia Grymalska (Czech Republic) Gabriela Pantůčková	(Croatia) Tena Lukas (Czech Republic) Pernilla Mendesová (Hungary) Fanny Stollár (Czech Republic) Karolína Muchová
July 11	ITS Cup; Olomouc, Czech Republic; Clay $50,000; Singles – Doubles	(Bosnia and Herzegovina) Ema Burgić Bucko (Bosnia and Herzegovina) Jasmina Tinjić; 7–5, 6–3	(Philippines) Katharina Lehnert (Ukraine) Anastasiya Shoshyna	(Italy) Anastasia Grymalska (Czech Republic) Gabriela Pantůčková	(Croatia) Tena Lukas (Czech Republic) Pernilla Mendesová (Hungary) Fanny Stollár (Czech Republic) Karolína Muchová
July 11	Bursa Cup; Bursa, Turkey; Clay $50,000; Singles – Doubles	Unfinished due to the disturbances in Turkey caused by the 2016 Turkish coup d'état attempt		(Turkey) İpek Soylu (North Macedonia) Lina Gjorcheska (Georgia (country)) Sofia Shapatava (Serbia) Nina Stojanović	(Israel) Deniz Khazaniuk (Georgia (country)) Ekaterine Gorgodze (Bosnia and Herzegovina) Dea Herdželaš (Russia) Anastasia Gasanova
July 11	Bursa Cup; Bursa, Turkey; Clay $50,000; Singles – Doubles	Unfinished due to the disturbances in Turkey caused by the 2016 Turkish coup d'état attempt		(Turkey) İpek Soylu (North Macedonia) Lina Gjorcheska (Georgia (country)) Sofia Shapatava (Serbia) Nina Stojanović	(Israel) Deniz Khazaniuk (Georgia (country)) Ekaterine Gorgodze (Bosnia and Herzegovina) Dea Herdželaš (Russia) Anastasia Gasanova
July 11	Stockton Challenger; Stockton, United States; Hard $50,000; Singles – Doubles	(Belgium) Alison Van Uytvanck; 6–3, 3–6, 6–2	(Russia) Anastasia Pivovarova	(United States) Catherine Bellis (Portugal) Michelle Larcher de Brito	(Australia) Arina Rodionova (United States) Jamie Loeb (Poland) Urszula Radwańska (United States) Robin Anderson
July 11	Stockton Challenger; Stockton, United States; Hard $50,000; Singles – Doubles	(Czech Republic) Kristýna Plíšková (Belgium) Alison Van Uytvanck; 6–2, 6–3	(United States) Robin Anderson (United States) Maegan Manasse	(United States) Catherine Bellis (Portugal) Michelle Larcher de Brito	(Australia) Arina Rodionova (United States) Jamie Loeb (Poland) Urszula Radwańska (United States) Robin Anderson
July 11	Winnipeg National Bank Challenger; Winnipeg, Canada; Hard $25,000; Singles and doubles draws	(United States) Francesca Di Lorenzo; 6–4, 6–1	(Canada) Erin Routliffe	(Australia) Olivia Rogowska (United States) Ronit Yurovsky	(United Kingdom) Harriet Dart (Australia) Lizette Cabrera (Japan) Michika Ozeki (Japan) Miharu Imanishi
July 11	Winnipeg National Bank Challenger; Winnipeg, Canada; Hard $25,000; Singles and doubles draws	(United States) Francesca Di Lorenzo (United States) Ronit Yurovsky; 1–6, 7–5, [10–6]	(Canada) Marie-Alexandre Leduc (Canada) Charlotte Robillard-Millette	(Australia) Olivia Rogowska (United States) Ronit Yurovsky	(United Kingdom) Harriet Dart (Australia) Lizette Cabrera (Japan) Michika Ozeki (Japan) Miharu Imanishi
July 11	Qujing, China; Hard $25,000; Singles and doubles draws	(Uzbekistan) Nigina Abduraimova; 7–5, 6–3	(China) Liu Fangzhou	(Japan) Akiko Omae (South Korea) Jang Su-jeong	(China) Lu Jingjing (Chinese Taipei) Lee Ya-hsuan (Chinese Taipei) Hsu Ching-wen (China) Xun Fangying
July 11	Qujing, China; Hard $25,000; Singles and doubles draws	(Japan) Akiko Omae (Thailand) Peangtarn Plipuech; 6–3, 6–3	(China) Jiang Xinyu (China) Tang Qianhui	(Japan) Akiko Omae (South Korea) Jang Su-jeong	(China) Lu Jingjing (Chinese Taipei) Lee Ya-hsuan (Chinese Taipei) Hsu Ching-wen (China) Xun Fangying
July 11	Aschaffenburg, Germany; Clay $25,000; Singles and doubles draws	(Russia) Anna Kalinskaya; 6–3, 2–6, 6–2	(Slovenia) Dalila Jakupović	(Netherlands) Arantxa Rus (Germany) Anna Zaja	(France) Shérazad Reix (Italy) Martina Trevisan (India) Ankita Raina (Netherlands) Quirine Lemoine
July 11	Aschaffenburg, Germany; Clay $25,000; Singles and doubles draws	(Germany) Nicola Geuer (Germany) Anna Zaja; 6–4, 6–4	(Slovenia) Dalila Jakupović (China) Lu Jiajing	(Netherlands) Arantxa Rus (Germany) Anna Zaja	(France) Shérazad Reix (Italy) Martina Trevisan (India) Ankita Raina (Netherlands) Quirine Lemoine
July 11	Imola, Italy; Carpet $25,000; Singles and doubles draws	(Russia) Veronika Kudermetova; 6–4, 6–2	(Netherlands) Michaëlla Krajicek	(Italy) Jasmine Paolini (Russia) Anna Blinkova	(Italy) Corinna Dentoni (Slovakia) Michaela Hončová (Italy) Deborah Chiesa (United Kingdom) Amanda Carreras
July 11	Imola, Italy; Carpet $25,000; Singles and doubles draws	(Greece) Eleni Daniilidou (Switzerland) Lisa Sabino; 4–6, 6–2, [10–4]	(Italy) Martina Di Giuseppe (Italy) Maria Masini	(Italy) Jasmine Paolini (Russia) Anna Blinkova	(Italy) Corinna Dentoni (Slovakia) Michaela Hončová (Italy) Deborah Chiesa (United Kingdom) Amanda Carreras
July 11	Knokke, Belgium; Clay $10,000; Singles and doubles draws	(Spain) Eva Guerrero Álvarez; 6–2, 6–3	(France) Margot Yerolymos	(Brazil) Carolina Alves (Australia) Astra Sharma	(Germany) Julyette Steur (Argentina) Carla Lucero (France) Priscilla Heise (Belgium) Kimberley Zimmermann
July 11	Knokke, Belgium; Clay $10,000; Singles and doubles draws	(United States) Frances Altick (Australia) Astra Sharma; 6–4, 6–4	(Belgium) Déborah Kerfs (Netherlands) Kelly Versteeg	(Brazil) Carolina Alves (Australia) Astra Sharma	(Germany) Julyette Steur (Argentina) Carla Lucero (France) Priscilla Heise (Belgium) Kimberley Zimmermann
July 11	Sharm el-Sheikh, Egypt; Hard $10,000; Singles and doubles draws	(Sweden) Jacqueline Cabaj Awad; 7–6^{(7–2)}, 6–4	(Romania) Ioana Pietroiu	(Sweden) Brenda Njuki (Montenegro) Ana Veselinović	(India) Snehadevi Reddy (Egypt) Lamis Alhussein Abdel Aziz (France) Clémence Fayol (Russia) Varvara Kuznetsova
July 11	Sharm el-Sheikh, Egypt; Hard $10,000; Singles and doubles draws	(Sweden) Jacqueline Cabaj Awad (Montenegro) Ana Veselinović; 6–4, 6–1	(Ukraine) Kateryna Sliusar (India) Dhruthi Tatachar Venugopal	(Sweden) Brenda Njuki (Montenegro) Ana Veselinović	(India) Snehadevi Reddy (Egypt) Lamis Alhussein Abdel Aziz (France) Clémence Fayol (Russia) Varvara Kuznetsova
July 11	Victoria Park, Hong Kong; Hard $10,000; Singles and doubles draws	(Japan) Mizuno Kijima; 6–1, 6–2	(Thailand) Varunya Wongteanchai	(China) Zhang Yukun (Hong Kong) Katherine Ip	(India) Prerna Bhambri (Chinese Taipei) Cho I-hsuan (United States) Jessica Wacnik (Thailand) Bunyawi Thamchaiwat
July 11	Victoria Park, Hong Kong; Hard $10,000; Singles and doubles draws	(Hong Kong) Eudice Chong (Hong Kong) Katherine Ip; 6–2, 6–2	(Australia) Alexandra Bozovic (Australia) Kaylah McPhee	(China) Zhang Yukun (Hong Kong) Katherine Ip	(India) Prerna Bhambri (Chinese Taipei) Cho I-hsuan (United States) Jessica Wacnik (Thailand) Bunyawi Thamchaiwat
July 11	Prokuplje, Serbia; Clay $10,000; Singles and doubles draws	(France) Sara Cakarevic; 6–2, 6–0	(Japan) Satsuki Takamura	(Serbia) Kristina Ostojić (Serbia) Jelena Lukić	(Slovakia) Barbara Kötelesová (Austria) Mira Antonitsch (Russia) Anna Makhorkina (Serbia) Tamara Čurović
July 11	Prokuplje, Serbia; Clay $10,000; Singles and doubles draws	(Russia) Veronica Miroshnichenko (Russia) Valeriya Zeleva; 7–5, 6–1	(Turkey) Hülya Esen (Turkey) Lütfiye Esen	(Serbia) Kristina Ostojić (Serbia) Jelena Lukić	(Slovakia) Barbara Kötelesová (Austria) Mira Antonitsch (Russia) Anna Makhorkina (Serbia) Tamara Čurović
July 11	Gimcheon, South Korea; Hard $10,000; Singles and doubles draws	(China) Wang Yan; 6–4, 7–6^{(7–1)}	(South Korea) Choi Ji-hee	(South Korea) Jeong Su-nam (Japan) Mana Ayukawa	(South Korea) Yea Hyo-jung (Japan) Ayano Shimizu (South Korea) Park Sang-hee (South Korea) Jeong Yeong-won
July 11	Gimcheon, South Korea; Hard $10,000; Singles and doubles draws	(Indonesia) Jessy Rompies (Japan) Ayano Shimizu; 6–2, 7–5	(South Korea) Hong Seung-yeon (South Korea) Kang Seo-kyung	(South Korea) Jeong Su-nam (Japan) Mana Ayukawa	(South Korea) Yea Hyo-jung (Japan) Ayano Shimizu (South Korea) Park Sang-hee (South Korea) Jeong Yeong-won
July 18	FSP Gold River Women's Challenger; Sacramento, United States; Hard $50,000; Singles – Doubles	(United States) Sofia Kenin; 4–6, 6–1, 6–4	(United States) Grace Min	(Russia) Valeria Solovyeva (Uzbekistan) Sabina Sharipova	(France) Caroline Roméo (Belgium) An-Sophie Mestach (Ukraine) Elizaveta Ianchuk (United States) Kristie Ahn
July 18	FSP Gold River Women's Challenger; Sacramento, United States; Hard $50,000; Singles – Doubles	(United States) Ashley Weinhold (United States) Caitlin Whoriskey; 6–4, 6–4	(United States) Jamie Loeb (South Africa) Chanel Simmonds	(Russia) Valeria Solovyeva (Uzbekistan) Sabina Sharipova	(France) Caroline Roméo (Belgium) An-Sophie Mestach (Ukraine) Elizaveta Ianchuk (United States) Kristie Ahn
July 18	Darmstadt, Germany; Clay $25,000; Singles and doubles draws	(Germany) Tamara Korpatsch; 6–2, 6–2	(France) Fiona Ferro	(Russia) Evgeniya Rodina (Slovenia) Dalila Jakupović	(Belgium) Elyne Boeykens (Russia) Polina Vinogradova (Germany) Anna Zaja (Bulgaria) Isabella Shinikova
July 18	Darmstadt, Germany; Clay $25,000; Singles and doubles draws	(Greece) Valentini Grammatikopoulou (Russia) Anna Kalinskaya; 6–4, 6–1	(Bosnia and Herzegovina) Anita Husarić (Slovenia) Dalila Jakupović	(Russia) Evgeniya Rodina (Slovenia) Dalila Jakupović	(Belgium) Elyne Boeykens (Russia) Polina Vinogradova (Germany) Anna Zaja (Bulgaria) Isabella Shinikova
July 18	Bad Waltersdorf, Austria; Clay $10,000; Singles and doubles draws	(Liechtenstein) Kathinka von Deichmann; 7–5, 6–4	(Czech Republic) Gabriela Pantůčková	(Russia) Anastasia Pribylova (Czech Republic) Petra Krejsová	(Slovenia) Nina Potočnik (Czech Republic) Zuzana Zálabská (Austria) Marlies Szupper (Czech Republic) Miriam Kolodziejová
July 18	Bad Waltersdorf, Austria; Clay $10,000; Singles and doubles draws	(Slovenia) Nina Potočnik (Slovenia) Polona Reberšak; 6–3, 6–4	(Slovenia) Nastja Kolar (United Kingdom) Francesca Stephenson	(Russia) Anastasia Pribylova (Czech Republic) Petra Krejsová	(Slovenia) Nina Potočnik (Czech Republic) Zuzana Zálabská (Austria) Marlies Szupper (Czech Republic) Miriam Kolodziejová
July 18	Sharm el-Sheikh, Egypt; Hard $10,000; Singles and doubles draws	(Sweden) Brenda Njuki; 6–4, 6–3	(Greece) Eleni Kordolaimi	(Germany) Christina Shakovets (United Kingdom) Mirabelle Njoze	(France) Victoria Muntean (United States) Eva Siska (Morocco) Lina Qostal (Italy) Natasha Piludu
July 18	Sharm el-Sheikh, Egypt; Hard $10,000; Singles and doubles draws	(Switzerland) Karin Kennel (France) Victoria Muntean; 7–6^{(7–4)}, 2–6, [10–4]	(Egypt) Ola Abou Zekry (India) Dhruthi Tatachar Venugopal	(Germany) Christina Shakovets (United Kingdom) Mirabelle Njoze	(France) Victoria Muntean (United States) Eva Siska (Morocco) Lina Qostal (Italy) Natasha Piludu
July 18	Tampere Open; Tampere, Finland; Clay $10,000; Singles and doubles draws	(Finland) Piia Suomalainen; 0–6, 6–2, 6–3	(Finland) Emma Laine	(Russia) Angelina Zhuravleva (Russia) Anastasia Chikalkina	(Russia) Aleksandra Vostrikova (Germany) Nora Niedmers (Germany) Katharina Hering (Germany) Julia Wachaczyk
July 18	Tampere Open; Tampere, Finland; Clay $10,000; Singles and doubles draws	(Finland) Emma Laine (Germany) Julia Wachaczyk; 6–2, 6–3	(Finland) Mia Eklund (Germany) Katharina Hering	(Russia) Angelina Zhuravleva (Russia) Anastasia Chikalkina	(Russia) Aleksandra Vostrikova (Germany) Nora Niedmers (Germany) Katharina Hering (Germany) Julia Wachaczyk
July 18	Saint-Gervais-les-Bains, France; Clay $10,000; Singles and doubles draws	(United States) Chiara Scholl; 6–2, 6–2	(France) Constance Sibille	(Russia) Marina Shamayko (Australia) Ellen Perez	(Switzerland) Chiara Frapolli (Spain) Yvonne Cavallé Reimers (France) Alice Bacquié (France) Elixane Lechemia
July 18	Saint-Gervais-les-Bains, France; Clay $10,000; Singles and doubles draws	(Australia) Abbie Myers (Australia) Ellen Perez; 7–6^{(7–5)}, 6–2	(Oman) Fatma Al-Nabhani (France) Estelle Cascino	(Russia) Marina Shamayko (Australia) Ellen Perez	(Switzerland) Chiara Frapolli (Spain) Yvonne Cavallé Reimers (France) Alice Bacquié (France) Elixane Lechemia
July 18	Victoria Park, Hong Kong; Hard $10,000; Singles and doubles draws	(Japan) Ayano Shimizu; 1–6, 6–4, 6–0	(China) Tang Haochen	(China) Zhang Yukun (Chinese Taipei) Lee Pei-chi	(China) Gai Ao (India) Kyra Shroff (Hong Kong) Ng Kwan-yau (United States) Jessica Wacnik
July 18	Victoria Park, Hong Kong; Hard $10,000; Singles and doubles draws	(Japan) Nagi Hanatani (Australia) Alana Parnaby; 6–4, 4–6, [13–11]	(China) Gai Ao (China) Zhang Ying	(China) Zhang Yukun (Chinese Taipei) Lee Pei-chi	(China) Gai Ao (India) Kyra Shroff (Hong Kong) Ng Kwan-yau (United States) Jessica Wacnik
July 18	Schio, Italy; Clay $10,000; Singles and doubles draws	(Ukraine) Valeriya Strakhova; 6–3, 6–1	(Italy) Lucrezia Stefanini	(Italy) Deborah Chiesa (Greece) Eleni Daniilidou	(Italy) Giorgia Marchetti (Italy) Alice Balducci (Italy) Camilla Scala (Italy) Nicola Fossa Huergo
July 18	Schio, Italy; Clay $10,000; Singles and doubles draws	(Chile) Bárbara Gatica (Colombia) María Fernanda Herazo; 7–5, 1–6, [10–5]	(Italy) Alice Balducci (Italy) Deborah Chiesa	(Italy) Deborah Chiesa (Greece) Eleni Daniilidou	(Italy) Giorgia Marchetti (Italy) Alice Balducci (Italy) Camilla Scala (Italy) Nicola Fossa Huergo
July 18	Astana, Kazakhstan; Hard $10,000; Singles and doubles draws	(Belarus) Vera Lapko; 7–6^{(7–3)}, 3–6, 6–4	(Russia) Valeria Savinykh	(Ukraine) Alyona Sotnikova (Russia) Marta Paigina	(Georgia (country)) Mariam Bolkvadze (Russia) Lusine Avanesyan (Kyrgyzstan) Ksenia Palkina Ulukan (Kazakhstan) Gozal Ainitdinova
July 18	Astana, Kazakhstan; Hard $10,000; Singles and doubles draws	(Russia) Anastasia Frolova (Russia) Angelina Gabueva; 6–2, 6–3	(Belarus) Sviatlana Pirazhenka (Ukraine) Alyona Sotnikova	(Ukraine) Alyona Sotnikova (Russia) Marta Paigina	(Georgia (country)) Mariam Bolkvadze (Russia) Lusine Avanesyan (Kyrgyzstan) Ksenia Palkina Ulukan (Kazakhstan) Gozal Ainitdinova
July 18	Târgu Jiu, Romania; Clay $10,000; Singles and doubles draws	(Romania) Jaqueline Cristian; 7–6^{(7–5)}, 6–3	(Romania) Gabriela Talabă	(Moldova) Alexandra Perper (Romania) Miriam Bulgaru	(Romania) Cristina Ene (Japan) Chihiro Muramatsu (France) Laëtitia Sarrazin (Argentina) Julieta Estable
July 18	Târgu Jiu, Romania; Clay $10,000; Singles and doubles draws	(Romania) Andreea Roșca (Romania) Gabriela Tătăruș; 4–6, 6–4, [10–8]	(United States) Quinn Gleason (United States) Melissa Kopinski	(Moldova) Alexandra Perper (Romania) Miriam Bulgaru	(Romania) Cristina Ene (Japan) Chihiro Muramatsu (France) Laëtitia Sarrazin (Argentina) Julieta Estable
July 18	Prokuplje, Serbia; Clay $10,000; Singles and doubles draws	(Serbia) Katarina Jokić; 6–4, 7–5	(France) Sara Cakarevic	(Ukraine) Marianna Zakarlyuk (Japan) Satsuki Takamura	(Bulgaria) Dia Evtimova (Slovakia) Barbara Kötelesová (Russia) Veronica Miroshnichenko (Serbia) Marina Kachar
July 18	Prokuplje, Serbia; Clay $10,000; Singles and doubles draws	(Serbia) Tamara Čurović (Slovakia) Barbara Kötelesová; 5–7, 6–3, [10–8]	(Australia) Masa Jovanovic (Australia) Angelique Svinos	(Ukraine) Marianna Zakarlyuk (Japan) Satsuki Takamura	(Bulgaria) Dia Evtimova (Slovakia) Barbara Kötelesová (Russia) Veronica Miroshnichenko (Serbia) Marina Kachar
July 18	Don Benito, Spain; Carpet $10,000; Singles and doubles draws	(Switzerland) Lisa Sabino; 6–0, 6–3	(Spain) María José Luque Moreno	(United Kingdom) Laura Deigman (Portugal) Maria João Koehler	(Russia) Yana Sizikova (Egypt) Dalila Said (Netherlands) Chayenne Ewijk (Spain) María Martínez Martínez
July 18	Don Benito, Spain; Carpet $10,000; Singles and doubles draws	(Netherlands) Chayenne Ewijk (Netherlands) Rosalie van der Hoek; 7–5, 6–2	(Spain) Arabela Fernández Rabener (Russia) Yana Sizikova	(United Kingdom) Laura Deigman (Portugal) Maria João Koehler	(Russia) Yana Sizikova (Egypt) Dalila Said (Netherlands) Chayenne Ewijk (Spain) María Martínez Martínez
July 18	Evansville, United States; Hard $10,000; Singles and doubles draws	(United States) Kennedy Shaffer; 6–4, 1–6, 6–2	(United States) Emina Bektas	(United States) Keri Wong (Japan) Miharu Imanishi	(United States) Brynn Boren (United States) Whitney Osuigwe (United States) Francesca Di Lorenzo (United States) Sara Daavettila
July 18	Evansville, United States; Hard $10,000; Singles and doubles draws	(United States) Sophie Chang (United States) Alexandra Mueller; 6–1, 6–4	(United States) Brynn Boren (United States) Keri Wong	(United States) Keri Wong (Japan) Miharu Imanishi	(United States) Brynn Boren (United States) Whitney Osuigwe (United States) Francesca Di Lorenzo (United States) Sara Daavettila
July 25	Advantage Cars Prague Open; Prague, Czech Republic; Clay $75,000; Singles – Doubles	(Germany) Antonia Lottner; 7–6^{(8–6)}, 1–6, 7–5	(Germany) Carina Witthöft	(Sweden) Rebecca Peterson (Slovakia) Rebecca Šramková	(Germany) Mona Barthel (Russia) Elizaveta Kulichkova (Ukraine) Kateryna Kozlova (Russia) Evgeniya Rodina
July 25	Advantage Cars Prague Open; Prague, Czech Republic; Clay $75,000; Singles – Doubles	(Netherlands) Demi Schuurs (Czech Republic) Renata Voráčová; 7–5, 3–6, [10–4]	(Spain) Sílvia Soler Espinosa (Spain) Sara Sorribes Tormo	(Sweden) Rebecca Peterson (Slovakia) Rebecca Šramková	(Germany) Mona Barthel (Russia) Elizaveta Kulichkova (Ukraine) Kateryna Kozlova (Russia) Evgeniya Rodina
July 25	ITF Women's Circuit – Wuhan; Wuhan, China; Hard $50,000; Singles – Doubles	(China) Wang Qiang; 7–5, 6–2	(Thailand) Luksika Kumkhum	(Japan) Shuko Aoyama (Uzbekistan) Nigina Abduraimova	(China) Wang Yafan (Japan) Akiko Omae (Poland) Urszula Radwańska (Japan) Kurumi Nara
July 25	ITF Women's Circuit – Wuhan; Wuhan, China; Hard $50,000; Singles – Doubles	(Japan) Shuko Aoyama (Japan) Makoto Ninomiya; 6–4, 6–4	(Chinese Taipei) Chang Kai-chen (China) Duan Yingying	(Japan) Shuko Aoyama (Uzbekistan) Nigina Abduraimova	(China) Wang Yafan (Japan) Akiko Omae (Poland) Urszula Radwańska (Japan) Kurumi Nara
July 25	Kentucky Bank Tennis Championships; Lexington, United States; Hard $50,000; Singles – Doubles	(Netherlands) Michaëlla Krajicek; 6–0, 2–6, 6–2	(Australia) Arina Rodionova	(United States) Jamie Loeb (Serbia) Jovana Jakšić	(Belgium) Alison Van Uytvanck (Belgium) Greet Minnen (Japan) Hiroko Kuwata (Uzbekistan) Sabina Sharipova
July 25	Kentucky Bank Tennis Championships; Lexington, United States; Hard $50,000; Singles – Doubles	(Japan) Hiroko Kuwata (China) Zhu Lin; 6–0, 7–5	(United States) Sophie Chang (United States) Alexandra Mueller	(United States) Jamie Loeb (Serbia) Jovana Jakšić	(Belgium) Alison Van Uytvanck (Belgium) Greet Minnen (Japan) Hiroko Kuwata (Uzbekistan) Sabina Sharipova
July 25	Torneio Internacional de Tênis Campos do Jordão; Campos do Jordão, Brazil; Hard $25,000; Singles and doubles draws	(Chile) Daniela Seguel; 7–5, 4–6, 7–5	(Bulgaria) Aleksandrina Naydenova	(Brazil) Paula Cristina Gonçalves (France) Alizé Lim	(Mexico) Renata Zarazúa (Brazil) Luisa Stefani (Paraguay) Montserrat González (Spain) Laura Pous Tió
July 25	Torneio Internacional de Tênis Campos do Jordão; Campos do Jordão, Brazil; Hard $25,000; Singles and doubles draws	(Brazil) Ingrid Gamarra Martins (Brazil) Laura Pigossi; 6–3, 3–6, [10–8]	(Brazil) Maria Fernanda Alves (Brazil) Luisa Stefani	(Brazil) Paula Cristina Gonçalves (France) Alizé Lim	(Mexico) Renata Zarazúa (Brazil) Luisa Stefani (Paraguay) Montserrat González (Spain) Laura Pous Tió
July 25	Horb am Neckar, Germany; Clay $25,000; Singles and doubles draws	(Germany) Tamara Korpatsch; 6–2, 6–1	(Czech Republic) Tereza Smitková	(Croatia) Tena Lukas (Netherlands) Richèl Hogenkamp	(Austria) Julia Grabher (Germany) Anne Schäfer (Turkey) İpek Soylu (Germany) Laura Schaeder
July 25	Horb am Neckar, Germany; Clay $25,000; Singles and doubles draws	(Netherlands) Richèl Hogenkamp (Netherlands) Lesley Kerkhove; 6–1, 7–6^{(7–2)}	(Bosnia and Herzegovina) Anita Husarić (Ukraine) Oleksandra Korashvili	(Croatia) Tena Lukas (Netherlands) Richèl Hogenkamp	(Austria) Julia Grabher (Germany) Anne Schäfer (Turkey) İpek Soylu (Germany) Laura Schaeder
July 25	President's Cup; Astana, Kazakhstan; Hard $25,000; Singles and doubles draws	(Ukraine) Alyona Sotnikova; 6–2, 6–3	(Russia) Veronika Kudermetova	(Russia) Polina Monova (Russia) Valeria Savinykh	(Ukraine) Anastasiya Vasylyeva (Kazakhstan) Gozal Ainitdinova (Russia) Anastasia Frolova (Kazakhstan) Alexandra Grinchishina
July 25	President's Cup; Astana, Kazakhstan; Hard $25,000; Singles and doubles draws	(Russia) Natela Dzalamidze (Russia) Veronika Kudermetova; 6–2, 6–3	(Russia) Polina Monova (Russia) Yana Sizikova	(Russia) Polina Monova (Russia) Valeria Savinykh	(Ukraine) Anastasiya Vasylyeva (Kazakhstan) Gozal Ainitdinova (Russia) Anastasia Frolova (Kazakhstan) Alexandra Grinchishina
July 25	Maaseik, Belgium; Clay $10,000; Singles and doubles draws	(Belgium) Déborah Kerfs; 6–2, 7–5	(Poland) Sandra Zaniewska	(Oman) Fatma Al-Nabhani (Switzerland) Tess Sugnaux	(France) Jade Suvrijn (Belgium) Eliessa Vanlangendonck (Netherlands) Bibiane Weijers (Germany) Laura Heinrichs
July 25	Maaseik, Belgium; Clay $10,000; Singles and doubles draws	(Australia) Sally Peers (Australia) Ellen Perez; 6–2, 6–2	(Belgium) Déborah Kerfs (United States) Chiara Scholl	(Oman) Fatma Al-Nabhani (Switzerland) Tess Sugnaux	(France) Jade Suvrijn (Belgium) Eliessa Vanlangendonck (Netherlands) Bibiane Weijers (Germany) Laura Heinrichs
July 25	Sharm el-Sheikh, Egypt; Hard $10,000; Singles and doubles draws	(India) Dhruthi Tatachar Venugopal; 7–6^{(8–6)}, 3–6, 6–3	(France) Victoria Muntean	(Czech Republic) Natálie Kallmünzerová (Turkey) Melis Sezer	(Italy) Natasha Piludu (India) Sri Peddi Reddy (Switzerland) Karin Kennel (Egypt) Ola Abou Zekry
July 25	Sharm el-Sheikh, Egypt; Hard $10,000; Singles and doubles draws	(Greece) Eleni Kordolaimi (India) Shweta Chandra Rana; 4–6, 7–5, [10–5]	(Egypt) Ola Abou Zekry (Ukraine) Kateryna Sliusar	(Czech Republic) Natálie Kallmünzerová (Turkey) Melis Sezer	(Italy) Natasha Piludu (India) Sri Peddi Reddy (Switzerland) Karin Kennel (Egypt) Ola Abou Zekry
July 25	Pärnu, Estonia; Clay $10,000; Singles and doubles draws	(Ukraine) Anastasia Zarytska; 6–4, 4–6, 6–3	(Ukraine) Ganna Poznikhirenko	(Russia) Ekaterina Kazionova (United Kingdom) Emily Arbuthnott	(Italy) Marianna Natali (Germany) Nora Niedmers (Russia) Aleksandra Vostrikova (Latvia) Laura Gulbe
July 25	Pärnu, Estonia; Clay $10,000; Singles and doubles draws	(United Kingdom) Emily Arbuthnott (Ukraine) Anastasia Zarytska; 6–4, 7–5	(Russia) Ekaterina Kazionova (Latvia) Denīza Marcinkēviča	(Russia) Ekaterina Kazionova (United Kingdom) Emily Arbuthnott	(Italy) Marianna Natali (Germany) Nora Niedmers (Russia) Aleksandra Vostrikova (Latvia) Laura Gulbe
July 25	Savitaipale, Finland; Clay $10,000; Singles and doubles draws	(Germany) Julia Wachaczyk; 6–4, 6–1	(Italy) Georgia Brescia	(Russia) Anastasia Chikalkina (Finland) Piia Suomalainen	(Russia) Angelina Zhuravleva (Netherlands) Chayenne Ewijk (Germany) Katharina Hering (Russia) Natalia Belova
July 25	Savitaipale, Finland; Clay $10,000; Singles and doubles draws	(Russia) Kseniia Bekker (Italy) Georgia Brescia; 4–6, 6–4, [10–5]	(Netherlands) Chayenne Ewijk (Netherlands) Rosalie van der Hoek	(Russia) Anastasia Chikalkina (Finland) Piia Suomalainen	(Russia) Angelina Zhuravleva (Netherlands) Chayenne Ewijk (Germany) Katharina Hering (Russia) Natalia Belova
July 25	Târgu Jiu, Romania; Clay $10,000; Singles and doubles draws	(Argentina) Julieta Estable; 4–6, 6–0, 6–4	(Moldova) Alexandra Perper	(Romania) Andreea Roșca (Romania) Irina Fetecău	(Japan) Chihiro Muramatsu (Romania) Cristina Ene (Romania) Jaqueline Cristian (United States) Quinn Gleason
July 25	Târgu Jiu, Romania; Clay $10,000; Singles and doubles draws	(Moldova) Alexandra Perper (Moldova) Anastasia Vdovenco; 1–6, 6–2, [10–8]	(United States) Quinn Gleason (United States) Melissa Kopinski	(Romania) Andreea Roșca (Romania) Irina Fetecău	(Japan) Chihiro Muramatsu (Romania) Cristina Ene (Romania) Jaqueline Cristian (United States) Quinn Gleason
July 25	Palić Open; Palić, Serbia; Clay $10,000; Singles and doubles draws	(Hungary) Ágnes Bukta; 6–4, 1–6, 6–4	(France) Sara Cakarevic	(Slovakia) Barbara Kötelesová (Bulgaria) Dia Evtimova	(Slovakia) Kristína Schmiedlová (Slovenia) Nina Potočnik (Czech Republic) Gabriela Horáčková (Slovakia) Martina Okáľová
July 25	Palić Open; Palić, Serbia; Clay $10,000; Singles and doubles draws	(Serbia) Barbara Bonić (Bulgaria) Dia Evtimova; 6–3, 6–3	(Czech Republic) Petra Krejsová (Slovenia) Nina Potočnik	(Slovakia) Barbara Kötelesová (Bulgaria) Dia Evtimova	(Slovakia) Kristína Schmiedlová (Slovenia) Nina Potočnik (Czech Republic) Gabriela Horáčková (Slovakia) Martina Okáľová
July 25	Open Castilla y León; El Espinar, Spain; Hard $10,000; Singles and doubles draws	(France) Jessika Ponchet; 6–4, 6–2	(Spain) Rocío de la Torre Sánchez	(Spain) Arabela Fernández Rabener (Italy) Giulia Gatto-Monticone	(Spain) Marta González Encinas (Romania) Ioana Loredana Roșca (Germany) Sarah-Rebecca Sekulic (United Kingdom) Laura Sainsbury
July 25	Open Castilla y León; El Espinar, Spain; Hard $10,000; Singles and doubles draws	(Ecuador) Charlotte Römer (Germany) Sarah-Rebecca Sekulic; 6–2, 7–6^{(7–4)}	(France) Jessika Ponchet (Romania) Ioana Loredana Roșca	(Spain) Arabela Fernández Rabener (Italy) Giulia Gatto-Monticone	(Spain) Marta González Encinas (Romania) Ioana Loredana Roșca (Germany) Sarah-Rebecca Sekulic (United Kingdom) Laura Sainsbury
July 25	Austin, United States; Hard $10,000; Singles and doubles draws	(Mexico) Marcela Zacarías; 7–5, 6–4	(United States) Ashley Kratzer	(United States) Ronit Yurovsky (United States) Josie Kuhlman	(United States) Jayci Goldsmith (Canada) Katherine Sebov (United States) Felicity Maltby (United States) Alexa Graham
July 25	Austin, United States; Hard $10,000; Singles and doubles draws	(United States) Lorraine Guillermo (United States) Catherine Harrison; 6–3, 6–3	(United States) Madison Harrison (United States) Stephanie Nauta	(United States) Ronit Yurovsky (United States) Josie Kuhlman	(United States) Jayci Goldsmith (Canada) Katherine Sebov (United States) Felicity Maltby (United States) Alexa Graham

=== August ===
Week of	Tournament	Winner	Runners-up	Semifinalists	Quarterfinalists
August 1	Challenger Banque Nationale de Granby; Granby, Canada; Hard $50,000; Singles – Doubles	(United States) Jennifer Brady; 7–5, 6–2	(Belarus) Olga Govortsova	(United States) Melanie Oudin (Canada) Aleksandra Wozniak	(Czech Republic) Barbora Štefková (Canada) Françoise Abanda (Belgium) Greet Minnen (Belgium) An-Sophie Mestach
August 1	Challenger Banque Nationale de Granby; Granby, Canada; Hard $50,000; Singles – Doubles	(United States) Jamie Loeb (Belgium) An-Sophie Mestach; 6–4, 6–4	(Israel) Julia Glushko (Belarus) Olga Govortsova	(United States) Melanie Oudin (Canada) Aleksandra Wozniak	(Czech Republic) Barbora Štefková (Canada) Françoise Abanda (Belgium) Greet Minnen (Belgium) An-Sophie Mestach
August 1	Plzeň, Czech Republic; Clay $25,000; Singles and doubles draws	(Russia) Natalia Vikhlyantseva; 6–1, 6–3	(Russia) Anna Kalinskaya	(Czech Republic) Michaela Bayerlová (Czech Republic) Tereza Smitková	(Italy) Nastassja Burnett (Serbia) Vesna Dolonc (Italy) Martina Di Giuseppe (Czech Republic) Barbora Krejčíková
August 1	Plzeň, Czech Republic; Clay $25,000; Singles and doubles draws	(Poland) Katarzyna Kawa (Sweden) Cornelia Lister; 6–1, 7–6^{(8–6)}	(Bosnia and Herzegovina) Ema Burgić Bucko (Spain) Georgina García Pérez	(Czech Republic) Michaela Bayerlová (Czech Republic) Tereza Smitková	(Italy) Nastassja Burnett (Serbia) Vesna Dolonc (Italy) Martina Di Giuseppe (Czech Republic) Barbora Krejčíková
August 1	Bad Saulgau, Germany; Clay $25,000; Singles and doubles draws	(Germany) Tamara Korpatsch; 6–2, 6–3	(Italy) Jasmine Paolini	(Slovenia) Dalila Jakupović (Italy) Jessica Pieri	(Slovakia) Viktória Kužmová (Bulgaria) Viktoriya Tomova (Romania) Cristina Dinu (Norway) Melanie Stokke
August 1	Bad Saulgau, Germany; Clay $25,000; Singles and doubles draws	(Romania) Irina Maria Bara (Ukraine) Oleksandra Korashvili; 7–5, 4–6, [10–4]	(Germany) Nicola Geuer (Germany) Anna Zaja	(Slovenia) Dalila Jakupović (Italy) Jessica Pieri	(Slovakia) Viktória Kužmová (Bulgaria) Viktoriya Tomova (Romania) Cristina Dinu (Norway) Melanie Stokke
August 1	Nonthaburi, Thailand; Hard $25,000; Singles and doubles draws	(Japan) Akiko Omae; 7–6^{(8–6)}, 6–4	(Russia) Olga Doroshina	(Thailand) Noppawan Lertcheewakarn (Singapore) Stefanie Tan	(Russia) Yana Sizikova (Thailand) Bunyawi Thamchaiwat (Japan) Shiho Akita (Russia) Marta Paigina
August 1	Nonthaburi, Thailand; Hard $25,000; Singles and doubles draws	(Russia) Olga Doroshina (Russia) Yana Sizikova; 4–6, 6–3, [11–9]	(Japan) Miyabi Inoue (Japan) Akiko Omae	(Thailand) Noppawan Lertcheewakarn (Singapore) Stefanie Tan	(Russia) Yana Sizikova (Thailand) Bunyawi Thamchaiwat (Japan) Shiho Akita (Russia) Marta Paigina
August 1	Fort Worth, United States; Hard $25,000; Singles and doubles draws	(United States) Caitlin Whoriskey; 6–0, 6–4	(United Kingdom) Tara Moore	(United States) Chanelle Van Nguyen (Japan) Mayo Hibi	(United States) Kayla Day (South Africa) Chanel Simmonds (United States) Jacqueline Cako (United States) Usue Maitane Arconada
August 1	Fort Worth, United States; Hard $25,000; Singles and doubles draws	(Chinese Taipei) Hsu Chieh-yu (South Africa) Chanel Simmonds; 6–0, 6–4	(United States) Jacqueline Cako (United States) Danielle Lao	(United States) Chanelle Van Nguyen (Japan) Mayo Hibi	(United States) Kayla Day (South Africa) Chanel Simmonds (United States) Jacqueline Cako (United States) Usue Maitane Arconada
August 1	Vienna, Austria; Clay $10,000; Singles and doubles draws	(Austria) Mira Antonitsch; 3–6, 7–6^{(7–2)}, 7–6^{(7–2)}	(Czech Republic) Petra Krejsová	(Italy) Martina Trevisan (Austria) Marlies Szupper	(Austria) Lisa-Maria Moser (Slovakia) Kristína Schmiedlová (China) Shao Yijia (Czech Republic) Sabina Machalová
August 1	Vienna, Austria; Clay $10,000; Singles and doubles draws	(Germany) Vivian Heisen (Austria) Janina Toljan; 6–3, 6–2	(Czech Republic) Petra Krejsová (Czech Republic) Anna Slováková	(Italy) Martina Trevisan (Austria) Marlies Szupper	(Austria) Lisa-Maria Moser (Slovakia) Kristína Schmiedlová (China) Shao Yijia (Czech Republic) Sabina Machalová
August 1	Rebecq, Belgium; Clay $10,000; Singles and doubles draws	(Belgium) Hélène Scholsen; 3–6, 6–1, 6–2	(Australia) Ellen Perez	(Germany) Katharina Hobgarski (Germany) Lisa-Marie Mätschke	(France) Julie Gervais (France) Jade Suvrijn (Belgium) Klaartje Liebens (Belgium) Kimberley Zimmermann
August 1	Rebecq, Belgium; Clay $10,000; Singles and doubles draws	(United Kingdom) Emily Arbuthnott (Germany) Katharina Hobgarski; 6–1, 6–1	(Poland) Justyna Jegiołka (United States) Chiara Scholl	(Germany) Katharina Hobgarski (Germany) Lisa-Marie Mätschke	(France) Julie Gervais (France) Jade Suvrijn (Belgium) Klaartje Liebens (Belgium) Kimberley Zimmermann
August 1	Vinkovci, Croatia; Clay $10,000; Singles and doubles draws	(France) Tessah Andrianjafitrimo; 6–4, 6–1	(Chile) Ivania Martinich	(Australia) Angelique Svinos (Hungary) Bianka Békefi	(Poland) Sandra Zaniewska (Hungary) Szabina Szlavikovics (Serbia) Tijana Spasojević (Germany) Linda Prenkovic
August 1	Vinkovci, Croatia; Clay $10,000; Singles and doubles draws	(Hungary) Bianka Békefi (Hungary) Szabina Szlavikovics; 6–4, 6–4	(Croatia) Tea Faber (Croatia) Ana Savić	(Australia) Angelique Svinos (Hungary) Bianka Békefi	(Poland) Sandra Zaniewska (Hungary) Szabina Szlavikovics (Serbia) Tijana Spasojević (Germany) Linda Prenkovic
August 1	Sharm el-Sheikh, Egypt; Hard $10,000; Singles and doubles draws	(Ukraine) Kateryna Sliusar; 2–6, 6–2, 6–3	(Romania) Ioana Pietroiu	(Netherlands) Phillis Vanenburg (United Kingdom) Mirabelle Njoze	(Greece) Eleni Kordolaimi (Turkey) Melis Sezer (Russia) Anna Pribylova (Russia) Ksenia Laskutova
August 1	Sharm el-Sheikh, Egypt; Hard $10,000; Singles and doubles draws	(Malaysia) Jawairiah Noordin (Malaysia) Theiviya Selvarajoo; 7–5, 4–6, [12–10]	(Russia) Ksenia Laskutova (Ukraine) Kateryna Sliusar	(Netherlands) Phillis Vanenburg (United Kingdom) Mirabelle Njoze	(Greece) Eleni Kordolaimi (Turkey) Melis Sezer (Russia) Anna Pribylova (Russia) Ksenia Laskutova
August 1	Tarvisio, Italy; Clay $10,000; Singles and doubles draws	(Slovenia) Manca Pislak; 6–1, 6–0	(Italy) Federica Bilardo	(Czech Republic) Kateřina Vaňková (Italy) Deborah Chiesa	(Germany) Natalie Pröse (Switzerland) Chiara Grimm (Italy) Francesca Sella (United Kingdom) Emily Appleton
August 1	Tarvisio, Italy; Clay $10,000; Singles and doubles draws	(Italy) Chiara Quattrone (Italy) Ludmilla Samsonova; 3–6, 6–4, [10–6]	(Italy) Angelica Moratelli (Italy) Anna Remondina	(Czech Republic) Kateřina Vaňková (Italy) Deborah Chiesa	(Germany) Natalie Pröse (Switzerland) Chiara Grimm (Italy) Francesca Sella (United Kingdom) Emily Appleton
August 1	Târgu Jiu, Romania; Clay $10,000; Singles and doubles draws	(Romania) Jaqueline Cristian; 7–5, 6–3	(Moldova) Anastasia Vdovenco	(Italy) Martina Spigarelli (Greece) Despina Papamichail	(Hungary) Vanda Lukács (Russia) Veronica Miroshnichenko (Romania) Miriam Bulgaru (Romania) Oana Georgeta Simion
August 1	Târgu Jiu, Romania; Clay $10,000; Singles and doubles draws	(Romania) Jaqueline Cristian (Greece) Despina Papamichail; 6–7^{(5–7)}, 6–0, [10–5]	(Argentina) Julieta Estable (Argentina) Daniela Farfán	(Italy) Martina Spigarelli (Greece) Despina Papamichail	(Hungary) Vanda Lukács (Russia) Veronica Miroshnichenko (Romania) Miriam Bulgaru (Romania) Oana Georgeta Simion
August 1	Valladolid, Spain; Hard $10,000; Singles and doubles draws	(Spain) Eva Guerrero Álvarez; 4–6, 6–4, 6–4	(Italy) Giulia Gatto-Monticone	(Portugal) Inês Murta (Italy) Anna Turati	(Ecuador) Charlotte Römer (Japan) Yuriko Miyazaki (Italy) Bianca Turati (Australia) Isabelle Wallace
August 1	Valladolid, Spain; Hard $10,000; Singles and doubles draws	(Spain) Ángela Fita Boluda (Australia) Isabelle Wallace; 6–1, 6–1	(Spain) Arabela Fernández Rabener (Spain) Ana Román Domínguez	(Portugal) Inês Murta (Italy) Anna Turati	(Ecuador) Charlotte Römer (Japan) Yuriko Miyazaki (Italy) Bianca Turati (Australia) Isabelle Wallace
August 8	Koksijde, Belgium; Clay $25,000; Singles and doubles draws	(Netherlands) Richèl Hogenkamp; 6–3, 4–6, 6–3	(France) Océane Dodin	(Netherlands) Quirine Lemoine (Belgium) Kimberley Zimmermann	(Denmark) Karen Barritza (India) Ankita Raina (Hungary) Dalma Gálfi (Netherlands) Arantxa Rus
August 8	Koksijde, Belgium; Clay $25,000; Singles and doubles draws	(Belgium) Steffi Distelmans (Netherlands) Demi Schuurs; 6–1, 6–4	(Turkey) Başak Eraydın (Belarus) Ilona Kremen	(Netherlands) Quirine Lemoine (Belgium) Kimberley Zimmermann	(Denmark) Karen Barritza (India) Ankita Raina (Hungary) Dalma Gálfi (Netherlands) Arantxa Rus
August 8	Challenger Banque Nationale de Gatineau; Gatineau, Canada; Hard $25,000; Singles – Doubles	(Canada) Bianca Andreescu; 6–2, 7–5	(United States) Ellie Halbauer	(Australia) Lizette Cabrera (Italy) Cristiana Ferrando	(Australia) Olivia Rogowska (United States) Jacqueline Cako (United States) Lauren Albanese (Czech Republic) Barbora Štefková
August 8	Challenger Banque Nationale de Gatineau; Gatineau, Canada; Hard $25,000; Singles – Doubles	(Canada) Bianca Andreescu (Canada) Charlotte Robillard-Millette; 4–6, 6–4, [10–6]	(Japan) Mana Ayukawa (United Kingdom) Samantha Murray	(Australia) Lizette Cabrera (Italy) Cristiana Ferrando	(Australia) Olivia Rogowska (United States) Jacqueline Cako (United States) Lauren Albanese (Czech Republic) Barbora Štefková
August 8	Naiman, China; Hard (indoor) $25,000; Singles and doubles draws	(China) Han Xinyun; 6–4, 6–3	(China) Liu Fangzhou	(Kazakhstan) Kamila Kerimbayeva (China) Tian Ran	(China) Zhang Ying (Thailand) Peangtarn Plipuech (Japan) Yuuki Tanaka (China) Xun Fangying
August 8	Naiman, China; Hard (indoor) $25,000; Singles and doubles draws	(China) Tang Haochen (China) Zhang Yukun; 7–6^{(7–0)}, 4–6, [10–4]	(China) Sun Xuliu (China) Xun Fangying	(Kazakhstan) Kamila Kerimbayeva (China) Tian Ran	(China) Zhang Ying (Thailand) Peangtarn Plipuech (Japan) Yuuki Tanaka (China) Xun Fangying
August 8	Hechingen, Germany; Clay $25,000; Singles and doubles draws	(Slovenia) Dalila Jakupović; 6–3, 4–6, 7–6^{(7–5)}	(Netherlands) Cindy Burger	(Bulgaria) Isabella Shinikova (Italy) Camilla Rosatello	(Switzerland) Patty Schnyder (Romania) Cristina Dinu (Czech Republic) Tereza Martincová (Italy) Jasmine Paolini
August 8	Hechingen, Germany; Clay $25,000; Singles and doubles draws	(Germany) Nicola Geuer (Germany) Anna Zaja; 6–3, 6–1	(Germany) Vivian Heisen (Austria) Pia König	(Bulgaria) Isabella Shinikova (Italy) Camilla Rosatello	(Switzerland) Patty Schnyder (Romania) Cristina Dinu (Czech Republic) Tereza Martincová (Italy) Jasmine Paolini
August 8	Landisville, United States; Hard $25,000; Singles and doubles draws	(United Kingdom) Laura Robson; 6–0, 6–0	(United States) Julia Elbaba	(Slovakia) Rebecca Šramková (Russia) Ekaterina Alexandrova	(Belgium) An-Sophie Mestach (Sweden) Susanne Celik (Mexico) Renata Zarazúa (China) Wang Yafan
August 8	Landisville, United States; Hard $25,000; Singles and doubles draws	(United Kingdom) Freya Christie (United Kingdom) Laura Robson; 6–3, 6–4	(Belgium) Elise Mertens (Belgium) An-Sophie Mestach	(Slovakia) Rebecca Šramková (Russia) Ekaterina Alexandrova	(Belgium) An-Sophie Mestach (Sweden) Susanne Celik (Mexico) Renata Zarazúa (China) Wang Yafan
August 8	Sharm el-Sheikh, Egypt; Hard $10,000; Singles and doubles draws	(Romania) Ioana Pietroiu; 6–2, 6–4	(Russia) Anzhelika Isaeva	(Georgia (country)) Mariam Bolkvadze (Japan) Mitsumi Kawasaki	(Egypt) Sandra Samir (Montenegro) Ana Veselinović (Malaysia) Theiviya Selvarajoo (Slovakia) Zuzana Zlochová
August 8	Sharm el-Sheikh, Egypt; Hard $10,000; Singles and doubles draws	(India) Sharmada Balu (Montenegro) Ana Veselinović; 4–6, 7–6^{(7–2)}, [10–8]	(Georgia (country)) Mariam Bolkvadze (Romania) Ana Bianca Mihăilă	(Georgia (country)) Mariam Bolkvadze (Japan) Mitsumi Kawasaki	(Egypt) Sandra Samir (Montenegro) Ana Veselinović (Malaysia) Theiviya Selvarajoo (Slovakia) Zuzana Zlochová
August 8	Aprilia, Italy; Clay $10,000; Singles and doubles draws	(Russia) Maria Marfutina; 6–4, 6–0	(Italy) Tatiana Pieri	(Italy) Federica Bilardo (Switzerland) Lisa Sabino	(France) Pauline Payet (Italy) Angelica Moratelli (Italy) Anna Remondina (Italy) Bianca Turati
August 8	Aprilia, Italy; Clay $10,000; Singles and doubles draws	(Italy) Giorgia Marchetti (Italy) Angelica Moratelli; 6–1, 6–3	(Italy) Deborah Chiesa (Denmark) Emilie Francati	(Italy) Federica Bilardo (Switzerland) Lisa Sabino	(France) Pauline Payet (Italy) Angelica Moratelli (Italy) Anna Remondina (Italy) Bianca Turati
August 8	Arad, Romania; Clay $10,000; Singles and doubles draws	(Slovakia) Chantal Škamlová; 6–2, 3–6, 6–4	(Romania) Laura-Ioana Andrei	(Hungary) Ágnes Bukta (Hungary) Luca Nagymihály	(Romania) Elena-Teodora Cadar (Hungary) Vanda Lukács (Argentina) Julieta Estable (Italy) Federica Arcidiacono
August 8	Arad, Romania; Clay $10,000; Singles and doubles draws	(Turkey) Ayla Aksu (Slovakia) Chantal Škamlová; 6–4, 6–2	(Turkey) Yasmin Gülman (Romania) Camelia Hristea	(Hungary) Ágnes Bukta (Hungary) Luca Nagymihály	(Romania) Elena-Teodora Cadar (Hungary) Vanda Lukács (Argentina) Julieta Estable (Italy) Federica Arcidiacono
August 8	Moscow, Russia; Clay $10,000; Singles and doubles draws	(Russia) Viktoria Kamenskaya; 6–3, 6–2	(Russia) Alena Tarasova	(Russia) Elena Rybakina (Russia) Olga Doroshina	(Russia) Vlada Koval (Russia) Olga Puchkova (Israel) Vlada Ekshibarova (Russia) Anastasia Kharitonova
August 8	Moscow, Russia; Clay $10,000; Singles and doubles draws	(Russia) Amina Anshba (Russia) Angelina Gabueva; 6–4, 6–4	(Armenia) Ani Amiraghyan (Russia) Daria Lodikova	(Russia) Elena Rybakina (Russia) Olga Doroshina	(Russia) Vlada Koval (Russia) Olga Puchkova (Israel) Vlada Ekshibarova (Russia) Anastasia Kharitonova
August 8	Las Palmas, Spain; Clay $10,000; Singles and doubles draws	(Australia) Samantha Harris; 6–7^{(4–7)}, 6–4, 7–6^{(9–7)}	(Oman) Fatma Al-Nabhani	(Ecuador) Charlotte Römer (Netherlands) Chayenne Ewijk	(Spain) Marta García Gausi (Portugal) Maria João Koehler (United Kingdom) Emily Arbuthnott (Belgium) Hélène Scholsen
August 8	Las Palmas, Spain; Clay $10,000; Singles and doubles draws	(Spain) Yvonne Cavallé Reimers (Ecuador) Charlotte Römer; 6–4, 6–4	(Spain) Arabela Fernández Rabener (Spain) Almudena Sanz Llaneza Fernández	(Ecuador) Charlotte Römer (Netherlands) Chayenne Ewijk	(Spain) Marta García Gausi (Portugal) Maria João Koehler (United Kingdom) Emily Arbuthnott (Belgium) Hélène Scholsen
August 15	Westende, Belgium; Hard $25,000; Singles and doubles draws	(Russia) Anna Blinkova; 7–5, 6–2	(Greece) Valentini Grammatikopoulou	(Israel) Deniz Khazaniuk (Poland) Magdalena Fręch	(Poland) Katarzyna Kawa (Croatia) Ana Vrljić (India) Ankita Raina (Ukraine) Katarina Zavatska
August 15	Westende, Belgium; Hard $25,000; Singles and doubles draws	(Belgium) Elyne Boeykens (Greece) Valentini Grammatikopoulou; 6–2, 6–3	(Netherlands) Quirine Lemoine (Netherlands) Eva Wacanno	(Israel) Deniz Khazaniuk (Poland) Magdalena Fręch	(Poland) Katarzyna Kawa (Croatia) Ana Vrljić (India) Ankita Raina (Ukraine) Katarina Zavatska
August 15	Leipzig, Germany; Clay $25,000; Singles and doubles draws	(Russia) Olesya Pervushina; 7–6^{(7–4)}, 3–6, 7–5	(Austria) Julia Grabher	(Netherlands) Arantxa Rus (Ukraine) Olga Ianchuk	(Romania) Irina Maria Bara (Switzerland) Patty Schnyder (France) Fiona Ferro (Croatia) Nina Alibalić
August 15	Leipzig, Germany; Clay $25,000; Singles and doubles draws	(Germany) Nicola Geuer (Germany) Anna Klasen; 7–6^{(7–4)}, 7–5	(Slovakia) Michaela Hončová (Ukraine) Olga Ianchuk	(Netherlands) Arantxa Rus (Ukraine) Olga Ianchuk	(Romania) Irina Maria Bara (Switzerland) Patty Schnyder (France) Fiona Ferro (Croatia) Nina Alibalić
August 15	Graz, Austria; Clay $10,000; Singles and doubles draws	(Czech Republic) Kateřina Vaňková; 6–1, 6–2	(Austria) Nicole Rottmann	(Germany) Vivian Wolff (Slovenia) Manca Pislak	(Norway) Melanie Stokke (Czech Republic) Veronika Vlkovská (Austria) Mira Antonitsch (Austria) Lisa-Maria Moser
August 15	Graz, Austria; Clay $10,000; Singles and doubles draws	(Czech Republic) Sabina Machalová (Czech Republic) Veronika Vlkovská; 6–3, 7–5	(Austria) Alena Weiss (Germany) Vivian Wolff	(Germany) Vivian Wolff (Slovenia) Manca Pislak	(Norway) Melanie Stokke (Czech Republic) Veronika Vlkovská (Austria) Mira Antonitsch (Austria) Lisa-Maria Moser
August 15	Medellín, Colombia; Clay $10,000; Singles and doubles draws	(France) Harmony Tan; 6–2, 7–5	(Chile) Fernanda Brito	(Argentina) Carla Lucero (United Kingdom) Emily Appleton	(Colombia) Emiliana Arango (Colombia) María Fernanda Herazo (Paraguay) Camila Giangreco Campiz (Colombia) Yuliana Monroy
August 15	Medellín, Colombia; Clay $10,000; Singles and doubles draws	(Chile) Fernanda Brito (Paraguay) Camila Giangreco Campiz; 6–4, 6–2	(Colombia) María Fernanda Herazo (Argentina) Carla Lucero	(Argentina) Carla Lucero (United Kingdom) Emily Appleton	(Colombia) Emiliana Arango (Colombia) María Fernanda Herazo (Paraguay) Camila Giangreco Campiz (Colombia) Yuliana Monroy
August 15	Sharm el-Sheikh, Egypt; Hard $10,000; Singles and doubles draws	(Turkey) Berfu Cengiz; 6–2, 6–4	(Sweden) Anette Munozova	(Romania) Ioana Pietroiu (Georgia (country)) Mariam Bolkvadze	(France) Clothilde de Bernardi (Germany) Verena Gantschnig (Greece) Despina Papamichail (Montenegro) Ana Veselinović
August 15	Sharm el-Sheikh, Egypt; Hard $10,000; Singles and doubles draws	(Greece) Despina Papamichail (Montenegro) Ana Veselinović; 7–6^{(7–4)}, 1–6, [10–5]	(Turkey) Berfu Cengiz (India) Dhruthi Tatachar Venugopal	(Romania) Ioana Pietroiu (Georgia (country)) Mariam Bolkvadze	(France) Clothilde de Bernardi (Germany) Verena Gantschnig (Greece) Despina Papamichail (Montenegro) Ana Veselinović
August 15	Sezze, Italy; Clay $10,000; Singles and doubles draws	(Russia) Maria Marfutina; 6–4, 6–0	(Italy) Bianca Turati	(France) Lou Brouleau (Italy) Beatrice Lombardo	(Italy) Lucia Bronzetti (Germany) Julia Wachaczyk (Italy) Federica Di Sarra (Denmark) Emilie Francati
August 15	Sezze, Italy; Clay $10,000; Singles and doubles draws	(France) Estelle Cascino (India) Kyra Shroff; 6–2, 6–2	(Italy) Beatrice Lombardo (France) Carla Touly	(France) Lou Brouleau (Italy) Beatrice Lombardo	(Italy) Lucia Bronzetti (Germany) Julia Wachaczyk (Italy) Federica Di Sarra (Denmark) Emilie Francati
August 15	Oldenzaal, Netherlands; Clay $10,000; Singles and doubles draws	(Italy) Georgia Brescia; 6–2, 3–6, 6–4	(United States) Chiara Scholl	(Switzerland) Chiara Grimm (Netherlands) Nina Kruijer	(Netherlands) Liza Lebedzeva (Belgium) Eliessa Vanlangendonck (Belgium) Déborah Kerfs (Germany) Hanna Landener
August 15	Oldenzaal, Netherlands; Clay $10,000; Singles and doubles draws	(Belgium) Déborah Kerfs (United States) Chiara Scholl; 6–3, 6–4	(Germany) Lisa-Marie Mätschke (Australia) Alana Parnaby	(Switzerland) Chiara Grimm (Netherlands) Nina Kruijer	(Netherlands) Liza Lebedzeva (Belgium) Eliessa Vanlangendonck (Belgium) Déborah Kerfs (Germany) Hanna Landener
August 15	Galați, Romania; Clay $10,000; Singles and doubles draws	(Italy) Giulia Gatto-Monticone; 6–3, 6–4	(Romania) Oana Georgeta Simion	(Moldova) Anastasia Vdovenco (Argentina) Julieta Estable	(Romania) Ioana Ivan (Romania) Irina Fetecău (Romania) Cristina Ene (Romania) Cristina Adamescu
August 15	Galați, Romania; Clay $10,000; Singles and doubles draws	(Romania) Oana Georgeta Simion (Romania) Gabriela Talabă; 5–7, 6–4, [10–3]	(Romania) Karola Bejenaru (Romania) Georgia Crăciun	(Moldova) Anastasia Vdovenco (Argentina) Julieta Estable	(Romania) Ioana Ivan (Romania) Irina Fetecău (Romania) Cristina Ene (Romania) Cristina Adamescu
August 15	Moscow, Russia; Clay $10,000; Singles and doubles draws	(Russia) Anastasiya Komardina; 6–4, 6–2	(Russia) Viktoria Kamenskaya	(Russia) Elena Rybakina (Russia) Amina Anshba	(Russia) Daria Kruzhkova (Russia) Angelina Zhuravleva (Russia) Yana Sizikova (Russia) Polina Monova
August 15	Moscow, Russia; Clay $10,000; Singles and doubles draws	(Russia) Anastasia Frolova (Russia) Margarita Lazareva; 6–2, 6–0	(Russia) Polina Novoselova (Russia) Aleksandra Pospelova	(Russia) Elena Rybakina (Russia) Amina Anshba	(Russia) Daria Kruzhkova (Russia) Angelina Zhuravleva (Russia) Yana Sizikova (Russia) Polina Monova
August 15	Slovenská Ľupča, Slovakia; Clay $10,000; Singles and doubles draws	(Slovakia) Lenka Juríková; 6–1, 6–2	(Czech Republic) Tereza Procházková	(Slovakia) Simona Parajová (Czech Republic) Petra Krejsová	(Czech Republic) Gabriela Pantůčková (Poland) Wiktoria Kulik (Bulgaria) Dia Evtimova (Czech Republic) Magdaléna Pantůčková
August 15	Slovenská Ľupča, Slovakia; Clay $10,000; Singles and doubles draws	(Czech Republic) Petra Krejsová (Slovakia) Chantal Škamlová; 6–2, 6–1	(Slovakia) Barbara Kötelesová (Slovakia) Viktória Kužmová	(Slovakia) Simona Parajová (Czech Republic) Petra Krejsová	(Czech Republic) Gabriela Pantůčková (Poland) Wiktoria Kulik (Bulgaria) Dia Evtimova (Czech Republic) Magdaléna Pantůčková
August 15	Las Palmas, Spain; Clay $10,000; Singles and doubles draws	(Venezuela) Andrea Gámiz; 6–1, 6–1	(United Kingdom) Emily Arbuthnott	(France) Marine Partaud (Spain) Yvonne Cavallé Reimers	(Oman) Fatma Al-Nabhani (Australia) Samantha Harris (Spain) Noelia Bouzó Zanotti (Belgium) Hélène Scholsen
August 15	Las Palmas, Spain; Clay $10,000; Singles and doubles draws	(Sweden) Jacqueline Cabaj Awad (France) Marine Partaud; 1–6, 7–5, [10–8]	(Spain) Yvonne Cavallé Reimers (Ecuador) Charlotte Römer	(France) Marine Partaud (Spain) Yvonne Cavallé Reimers	(Oman) Fatma Al-Nabhani (Australia) Samantha Harris (Spain) Noelia Bouzó Zanotti (Belgium) Hélène Scholsen
August 15	Kharkiv, Ukraine; Clay $10,000; Singles and doubles draws	(Belarus) Ilona Kremen; 6–1, 7–5	(Ukraine) Anastasiya Fedoryshyn	(Ukraine) Alyona Sotnikova (Ukraine) Anastasiya Shoshyna	(Russia) Lusine Avanesyan (Ukraine) Ganna Poznikhirenko (Ukraine) Maryna Chernyshova (Kazakhstan) Kamila Kerimbayeva
August 15	Kharkiv, Ukraine; Clay $10,000; Singles and doubles draws	(Ukraine) Veronika Kapshay (Ukraine) Anastasiya Shoshyna; 4–6, 6–4, [11–9]	(Belarus) Ilona Kremen (Ukraine) Ganna Poznikhirenko	(Ukraine) Alyona Sotnikova (Ukraine) Anastasiya Shoshyna	(Russia) Lusine Avanesyan (Ukraine) Ganna Poznikhirenko (Ukraine) Maryna Chernyshova (Kazakhstan) Kamila Kerimbayeva
August 22	Bükfürdő, Hungary; Clay $25,000; Singles and doubles draws	(Spain) Georgina García Pérez; 6–3, 6–0	(Czech Republic) Gabriela Pantůčková	(Hungary) Réka Luca Jani (Hungary) Dalma Gálfi	(Ukraine) Olga Ianchuk (France) Fiona Ferro (Slovakia) Michaela Hončová (Czech Republic) Tereza Martincová
August 22	Bükfürdő, Hungary; Clay $25,000; Singles and doubles draws	(Spain) Georgina García Pérez (Hungary) Fanny Stollár; 6–3, 7–6^{(7–4)}	(Hungary) Dalma Gálfi (Hungary) Réka Luca Jani	(Hungary) Réka Luca Jani (Hungary) Dalma Gálfi	(Ukraine) Olga Ianchuk (France) Fiona Ferro (Slovakia) Michaela Hončová (Czech Republic) Tereza Martincová
August 22	Bagnatica, Italy; Clay $25,000; Singles and doubles draws	(Italy) Martina Trevisan; 6–1, 5–7, 7–5	(Poland) Katarzyna Piter	(Italy) Claudia Giovine (Spain) Olga Sáez Larra	(Russia) Anna Blinkova (Italy) Alberta Brianti (Austria) Julia Grabher (Switzerland) Conny Perrin
August 22	Bagnatica, Italy; Clay $25,000; Singles and doubles draws	(Italy) Alice Matteucci (Italy) Camilla Rosatello; 6–4, 5–7, [10–5]	(Switzerland) Conny Perrin (Russia) Yana Sizikova	(Italy) Claudia Giovine (Spain) Olga Sáez Larra	(Russia) Anna Blinkova (Italy) Alberta Brianti (Austria) Julia Grabher (Switzerland) Conny Perrin
August 22	Tsukuba, Japan; Hard $25,000; Singles and doubles draws	(Thailand) Peangtarn Plipuech; 6–4, 6–0	(Belgium) Greet Minnen	(Japan) Junri Namigata (Chinese Taipei) Hsu Chieh-yu	(Japan) Riko Sawayanagi (Japan) Akiko Omae (Japan) Erika Sema (Japan) Miyabi Inoue
August 22	Tsukuba, Japan; Hard $25,000; Singles and doubles draws	(China) Lu Jiajing (Japan) Akiko Omae; 6–3, 4–6, [10–6]	(Japan) Shiho Akita (Japan) Miki Miyamura	(Japan) Junri Namigata (Chinese Taipei) Hsu Chieh-yu	(Japan) Riko Sawayanagi (Japan) Akiko Omae (Japan) Erika Sema (Japan) Miyabi Inoue
August 22	Kharkiv, Ukraine; Clay $25,000; Singles and doubles draws	(Russia) Anna Kalinskaya; 6–4, 1–6, 6–1	(Greece) Valentini Grammatikopoulou	(Russia) Viktoria Kamenskaya (Ukraine) Ganna Poznikhirenko	(Turkey) Başak Eraydın (Russia) Valentyna Ivakhnenko (Russia) Polina Monova (Russia) Anastasiya Komardina
August 22	Kharkiv, Ukraine; Clay $25,000; Singles and doubles draws	(Russia) Valentyna Ivakhnenko (Russia) Anastasiya Komardina; 6–1, 6–3	(Turkey) Başak Eraydın (Belarus) Ilona Kremen	(Russia) Viktoria Kamenskaya (Ukraine) Ganna Poznikhirenko	(Turkey) Başak Eraydın (Russia) Valentyna Ivakhnenko (Russia) Polina Monova (Russia) Anastasiya Komardina
August 22	Pörtschach, Austria; Clay $10,000; Singles and doubles draws	(Slovakia) Lenka Juríková; 6–1, 6–2	(Czech Republic) Miriam Kolodziejová	(Slovenia) Manca Pislak (Kazakhstan) Gozal Ainitdinova	(Austria) Livia Kraus (Austria) Caroline Ilowska (China) Shao Yijia (Austria) Marlies Szupper
August 22	Pörtschach, Austria; Clay $10,000; Singles and doubles draws	(Austria) Natasha Bredl (Austria) Caroline Ilowska; 3–6, 7–6^{(7–3)}, [10–6]	(Italy) Alice Balducci (Italy) Marcella Cucca	(Slovenia) Manca Pislak (Kazakhstan) Gozal Ainitdinova	(Austria) Livia Kraus (Austria) Caroline Ilowska (China) Shao Yijia (Austria) Marlies Szupper
August 22	Wanfercée-Baulet, Belgium; Clay $10,000; Singles and doubles draws	(Belgium) Kimberley Zimmermann; 6–2, 6–2	(Belgium) Hélène Scholsen	(France) Manon Arcangioli (Belgium) Klaartje Liebens	(Germany) Yana Morderger (France) Carla Touly (Spain) Marta García Gausi (Belgium) Margaux Bovy
August 22	Wanfercée-Baulet, Belgium; Clay $10,000; Singles and doubles draws	(France) Manon Arcangioli (Belgium) Magali Kempen; 6–2, 6–0	(Belgium) Anastasia Smirnova (Belgium) Victoria Smirnova	(France) Manon Arcangioli (Belgium) Klaartje Liebens	(Germany) Yana Morderger (France) Carla Touly (Spain) Marta García Gausi (Belgium) Margaux Bovy
August 22	Cali, Colombia; Clay $10,000; Singles and doubles draws	(Russia) Sofya Zhuk; 6–2, 6–4	(France) Harmony Tan	(Colombia) Emiliana Arango (Chile) Fernanda Brito	(United States) Stephanie Nemtsova (Bolivia) Noelia Zeballos (Peru) Dominique Schaefer (Paraguay) Camila Giangreco Campiz
August 22	Cali, Colombia; Clay $10,000; Singles and doubles draws	(Chile) Fernanda Brito (Paraguay) Camila Giangreco Campiz; 6–1, 6–4	(United Kingdom) Emily Appleton (Hungary) Naomi Totka	(Colombia) Emiliana Arango (Chile) Fernanda Brito	(United States) Stephanie Nemtsova (Bolivia) Noelia Zeballos (Peru) Dominique Schaefer (Paraguay) Camila Giangreco Campiz
August 22	Čakovec, Croatia; Clay $10,000; Singles and doubles draws	(Czech Republic) Magdaléna Pantůčková; 6–2, 7–6^{(7–4)}	(Czech Republic) Gabriela Horáčková	(Czech Republic) Monika Kilnarová (Czech Republic) Diana Šumová	(Czech Republic) Barbora Miklová (Bulgaria) Ani Vangelova (Slovakia) Sandra Jamrichová (Slovakia) Barbara Kötelesová
August 22	Čakovec, Croatia; Clay $10,000; Singles and doubles draws	(Slovenia) Sara Palčič (Slovenia) Nina Potočnik; 6–4, 6–3	(Serbia) Bojana Marinković (Bulgaria) Ani Vangelova	(Czech Republic) Monika Kilnarová (Czech Republic) Diana Šumová	(Czech Republic) Barbora Miklová (Bulgaria) Ani Vangelova (Slovakia) Sandra Jamrichová (Slovakia) Barbara Kötelesová
August 22	Sharm el-Sheikh, Egypt; Hard $10,000; Singles and doubles draws	(Slovakia) Tereza Mihalíková; 2–6, 6–3, 6–4	(Montenegro) Ana Veselinović	(India) Dhruthi Tatachar Venugopal (Zimbabwe) Valeria Bhunu	(United Kingdom) Mirabelle Njoze (Greece) Despina Papamichail (India) Rishika Sunkara (France) Fiona Codino
August 22	Sharm el-Sheikh, Egypt; Hard $10,000; Singles and doubles draws	(India) Sharmada Balu (India) Dhruthi Tatachar Venugopal; 6–3, 6–3	(Portugal) Inês Murta (United Kingdom) Mirabelle Njoze	(India) Dhruthi Tatachar Venugopal (Zimbabwe) Valeria Bhunu	(United Kingdom) Mirabelle Njoze (Greece) Despina Papamichail (India) Rishika Sunkara (France) Fiona Codino
August 22	Nuremberg, Germany; Clay $10,000; Singles and doubles draws	(Germany) Katharina Hobgarski; 2–6, 6–0, 6–2	(France) Jade Suvrijn	(Moldova) Anastasia Dețiuc (Germany) Lena-Marie Hofmann	(Czech Republic) Petra Krejsová (Germany) Sina Haas (Switzerland) Chiara Grimm (Germany) Katharina Gerlach
August 22	Nuremberg, Germany; Clay $10,000; Singles and doubles draws	(United States) Dasha Ivanova (Czech Republic) Petra Krejsová; 5–7, 6–1, [10–8]	(Germany) Katharina Hobgarski (Bosnia and Herzegovina) Anita Husarić	(Moldova) Anastasia Dețiuc (Germany) Lena-Marie Hofmann	(Czech Republic) Petra Krejsová (Germany) Sina Haas (Switzerland) Chiara Grimm (Germany) Katharina Gerlach
August 22	Rotterdam, Netherlands; Clay $10,000; Singles and doubles draws	(United States) Chiara Scholl; 7–6^{(7–4)}, 5–7, 7–6^{(10–8)}	(Denmark) Karen Barritza	(Belgium) Elyne Boeykens (France) Chloé Paquet	(Cambodia) Andrea Ka (Germany) Laura Heinrichs (Germany) Katharina Hering (Netherlands) Nina Kruijer
August 22	Rotterdam, Netherlands; Clay $10,000; Singles and doubles draws	(Denmark) Karen Barritza (United States) Chiara Scholl; 6–2, 6–3	(Netherlands) Rosalie van der Hoek (Belarus) Sviatlana Pirazhenka	(Belgium) Elyne Boeykens (France) Chloé Paquet	(Cambodia) Andrea Ka (Germany) Laura Heinrichs (Germany) Katharina Hering (Netherlands) Nina Kruijer
August 22	Bucharest, Romania; Clay $10,000; Singles and doubles draws	(Moldova) Anastasia Vdovenco; 6–4, 7–5	(Romania) Cristina Ene	(Romania) Andreea Roșca (United States) Sabrina Santamaria	(Romania) Irina Fetecău (Romania) Miriam Bulgaru (Bulgaria) Julia Stamatova (Romania) Elena Bogdan
August 22	Bucharest, Romania; Clay $10,000; Singles and doubles draws	(Romania) Andreea Roșca (Romania) Gabriela Tătăruș; 6–7^{(9–11)}, 6–2, [10–7]	(Romania) Elena Bogdan (Romania) Camelia Hristea	(Romania) Andreea Roșca (United States) Sabrina Santamaria	(Romania) Irina Fetecău (Romania) Miriam Bulgaru (Bulgaria) Julia Stamatova (Romania) Elena Bogdan
August 22	Caslano, Switzerland; Clay $10,000; Singles and doubles draws	(Italy) Georgia Brescia; 6–4, 3–1, ret.	(Italy) Cristiana Ferrando	(United Kingdom) Emily Arbuthnott (Switzerland) Tess Sugnaux	(Switzerland) Nina Stadler (Luxembourg) Eléonora Molinaro (Switzerland) Ylena In-Albon (Switzerland) Karin Kennel
August 22	Caslano, Switzerland; Clay $10,000; Singles and doubles draws	(Italy) Giada Clerici (Italy) Giorgia Marchetti; 7–5, 6–1	(Switzerland) Naïma Karamoko (Switzerland) Sara Ottomano	(United Kingdom) Emily Arbuthnott (Switzerland) Tess Sugnaux	(Switzerland) Nina Stadler (Luxembourg) Eléonora Molinaro (Switzerland) Ylena In-Albon (Switzerland) Karin Kennel
August 29	Guiyang, China; Hard (indoor) $25,000; Singles and doubles draws	(Uzbekistan) Sabina Sharipova; 6–7^{(1–7)}, 7–6^{(7–0)}, 6–4	(China) Guo Hanyu	(Uzbekistan) Nigina Abduraimova (China) Liu Chang	(Russia) Anastasia Gasanova (China) Wei Zhanlan (China) Guo Shanshan (China) Gao Xinyu
August 29	Guiyang, China; Hard (indoor) $25,000; Singles and doubles draws	(United Kingdom) Jocelyn Rae (United Kingdom) Anna Smith; 6–4, 3–6, [10–5]	(China) Wei Zhanlan (China) Zhao Qianqian	(Uzbekistan) Nigina Abduraimova (China) Liu Chang	(Russia) Anastasia Gasanova (China) Wei Zhanlan (China) Guo Shanshan (China) Gao Xinyu
August 29	Noto, Japan; Carpet $25,000; Singles and doubles draws	(Japan) Shiho Akita; 6–4, 6–4	(Japan) Ayano Shimizu	(Japan) Junri Namigata (Japan) Momoko Kobori	(Chinese Taipei) Lee Ya-hsuan (Belgium) Greet Minnen (Japan) Kanae Hisami (Japan) Riko Sawayanagi
August 29	Noto, Japan; Carpet $25,000; Singles and doubles draws	(Japan) Rika Fujiwara (Japan) Ayaka Okuno; 6–4, 1–6, [10–6]	(Japan) Akari Inoue (Japan) Miki Miyamura	(Japan) Junri Namigata (Japan) Momoko Kobori	(Chinese Taipei) Lee Ya-hsuan (Belgium) Greet Minnen (Japan) Kanae Hisami (Japan) Riko Sawayanagi
August 29	Almaty, Kazakhstan; Clay $25,000; Singles and doubles draws	(Russia) Viktoria Kamenskaya; 1–6, 6–3, 6–2	(Russia) Anna Blinkova	(Russia) Veronika Kudermetova (Turkey) Başak Eraydın	(Russia) Anna Kalinskaya (Russia) Valentyna Ivakhnenko (Russia) Anastasiya Komardina (Switzerland) Conny Perrin
August 29	Almaty, Kazakhstan; Clay $25,000; Singles and doubles draws	(Russia) Valentyna Ivakhnenko (Russia) Anastasiya Komardina; 7–5, 6–4	(Russia) Polina Monova (Russia) Valeria Savinykh	(Russia) Veronika Kudermetova (Turkey) Başak Eraydın	(Russia) Anna Kalinskaya (Russia) Valentyna Ivakhnenko (Russia) Anastasiya Komardina (Switzerland) Conny Perrin
August 29	Mamaia, Romania; Clay $25,000; Singles and doubles draws	(Italy) Jessica Pieri; 6–3, 6–4	(Italy) Jasmine Paolini	(Ukraine) Olga Ianchuk (Romania) Cristina Dinu	(Moldova) Anastasia Vdovenco (Norway) Ulrikke Eikeri (France) Fiona Ferro (Romania) Nicoleta Dascălu
August 29	Mamaia, Romania; Clay $25,000; Singles and doubles draws	(Slovakia) Vivien Juhászová (Czech Republic) Kateřina Kramperová; 7–6^{(7–3)}, 2–6, [10–7]	(Romania) Irina Maria Bara (Romania) Mihaela Buzărnescu	(Ukraine) Olga Ianchuk (Romania) Cristina Dinu	(Moldova) Anastasia Vdovenco (Norway) Ulrikke Eikeri (France) Fiona Ferro (Romania) Nicoleta Dascălu
August 29	Barcelona, Spain; Clay $25,000; Singles and doubles draws	(France) Océane Dodin; 6–3, 6–4	(Romania) Ioana Loredana Roșca	(Norway) Melanie Stokke (Spain) Laura Pous Tió	(Poland) Katarzyna Piter (Switzerland) Jil Teichmann (Italy) Martina Di Giuseppe (Netherlands) Lesley Kerkhove
August 29	Barcelona, Spain; Clay $25,000; Singles and doubles draws	(Venezuela) Andrea Gámiz (Spain) Georgina García Pérez; 6–2, 7–5	(Italy) Alice Matteucci (Switzerland) Jil Teichmann	(Norway) Melanie Stokke (Spain) Laura Pous Tió	(Poland) Katarzyna Piter (Switzerland) Jil Teichmann (Italy) Martina Di Giuseppe (Netherlands) Lesley Kerkhove
August 29	Sankt Pölten, Austria; Clay $10,000; Singles and doubles draws	(Slovakia) Lenka Juríková; 6–2, 6–4	(Slovakia) Kristína Schmiedlová	(Czech Republic) Kateřina Vaňková (Austria) Marlies Szupper	(Austria) Pia König (Poland) Justyna Jegiołka (Austria) Caroline Ilowska (Czech Republic) Diana Šumová
August 29	Sankt Pölten, Austria; Clay $10,000; Singles and doubles draws	(Poland) Justyna Jegiołka (Hungary) Vanda Lukács; 6–4, 4–6, [11–9]	(Croatia) Mariana Dražić (Austria) Janina Toljan	(Czech Republic) Kateřina Vaňková (Austria) Marlies Szupper	(Austria) Pia König (Poland) Justyna Jegiołka (Austria) Caroline Ilowska (Czech Republic) Diana Šumová
August 29	Prague, Czech Republic; Clay $10,000; Singles and doubles draws	(Czech Republic) Petra Krejsová; 7–5, 7–6^{(7–4)}	(Czech Republic) Miriam Kolodziejová	(Germany) Lisa Ponomar (Czech Republic) Vendula Žovincová	(Czech Republic) Tereza Procházková (Czech Republic) Sabina Machalová (United States) Dasha Ivanova (Moldova) Anastasia Dețiuc
August 29	Prague, Czech Republic; Clay $10,000; Singles and doubles draws	(Romania) Laura-Ioana Andrei (Germany) Sarah-Rebecca Sekulic; 6–4, 6–2	(Czech Republic) Miriam Kolodziejová (Czech Republic) Vendula Žovincová	(Germany) Lisa Ponomar (Czech Republic) Vendula Žovincová	(Czech Republic) Tereza Procházková (Czech Republic) Sabina Machalová (United States) Dasha Ivanova (Moldova) Anastasia Dețiuc
August 29	Sharm el-Sheikh, Egypt; Hard $10,000; Singles and doubles draws	(Slovakia) Tereza Mihalíková; 6–3, 7–6^{(7–3)}	(Zimbabwe) Valeria Bhunu	(Egypt) Sandra Samir (India) Dhruthi Tatachar Venugopal	(India) Sharmada Balu (Sweden) Anette Munozova (Egypt) Ola Abou Zekry (Guatemala) Melissa Morales
August 29	Sharm el-Sheikh, Egypt; Hard $10,000; Singles and doubles draws	(Romania) Ana Bianca Mihăilă (Egypt) Sandra Samir; 6–4, 6–1	(India) Sharmada Balu (India) Dhruthi Tatachar Venugopal	(Egypt) Sandra Samir (India) Dhruthi Tatachar Venugopal	(India) Sharmada Balu (Sweden) Anette Munozova (Egypt) Ola Abou Zekry (Guatemala) Melissa Morales
August 29	Batumi Ladies Open; Batumi, Georgia; Clay $10,000; Singles and doubles draws	(Georgia (country)) Mariam Bolkvadze; 6–4, 7–6^{(10–8)}	(Russia) Aleksandra Pospelova	(Russia) Margarita Lazareva (Russia) Olga Puchkova	(Georgia (country)) Tatia Mikadze (Russia) Daria Lodikova (Russia) Anastasia Frolova (Georgia (country)) Sofia Kvatsabaia
August 29	Batumi Ladies Open; Batumi, Georgia; Clay $10,000; Singles and doubles draws	(Ukraine) Alona Fomina (Russia) Margarita Lazareva; 6–4, 6–3	(Georgia (country)) Mariam Bolkvadze (Georgia (country)) Tatia Mikadze	(Russia) Margarita Lazareva (Russia) Olga Puchkova	(Georgia (country)) Tatia Mikadze (Russia) Daria Lodikova (Russia) Anastasia Frolova (Georgia (country)) Sofia Kvatsabaia
August 29	Trieste, Italy; Clay $10,000; Singles and doubles draws	(Italy) Claudia Giovine; 7–5, 0–6, 6–2	(Italy) Deborah Chiesa	(Italy) Alice Balducci (Slovenia) Manca Pislak	(Italy) Anna Procacci (Slovenia) Saša Klaneček (Italy) Giorgia Marchetti (Serbia) Bojana Marinković
August 29	Trieste, Italy; Clay $10,000; Singles and doubles draws	(Italy) Giorgia Marchetti (Italy) Maria Masini; 6–0, 6–0	(Serbia) Bojana Marinković (Slovenia) Sara Palčič	(Italy) Alice Balducci (Slovenia) Manca Pislak	(Italy) Anna Procacci (Slovenia) Saša Klaneček (Italy) Giorgia Marchetti (Serbia) Bojana Marinković
August 29	Schoonhoven, Netherlands; Clay $10,000; Singles and doubles draws	(United States) Chiara Scholl; 6–1, 6–4	(France) Chloé Paquet	(Netherlands) Chayenne Ewijk (Belarus) Sviatlana Pirazhenka	(France) Margot Yerolymos (Switzerland) Lisa Sabino (Belgium) Déborah Kerfs (Belgium) Catherine Chantraine
August 29	Schoonhoven, Netherlands; Clay $10,000; Singles and doubles draws	(Belgium) Déborah Kerfs (United States) Chiara Scholl; 6–1, 6–2	(Netherlands) Erika Vogelsang (Netherlands) Mandy Wagemaker	(Netherlands) Chayenne Ewijk (Belarus) Sviatlana Pirazhenka	(France) Margot Yerolymos (Switzerland) Lisa Sabino (Belgium) Déborah Kerfs (Belgium) Catherine Chantraine
August 29	Vrnjačka Banja, Serbia; Clay $10,000; Singles and doubles draws	(Russia) Sofya Golubovskaya; 6–3, 6–2	(Serbia) Bojana Marković	(Slovakia) Sandra Jamrichová (Japan) Satsuki Takamura	(Serbia) Kristina Ostojić (Serbia) Tijana Spasojević (Serbia) Kristina Miletić (Bulgaria) Julia Stamatova
August 29	Vrnjačka Banja, Serbia; Clay $10,000; Singles and doubles draws	(Serbia) Tamara Čurović (Slovakia) Sandra Jamrichová; 6–3, 6–2	(Serbia) Kristina Ostojić (Bulgaria) Ani Vangelova	(Slovakia) Sandra Jamrichová (Japan) Satsuki Takamura	(Serbia) Kristina Ostojić (Serbia) Tijana Spasojević (Serbia) Kristina Miletić (Bulgaria) Julia Stamatova
August 29	Yeongwol, South Korea; Hard $10,000; Singles and doubles draws	(South Korea) Hong Seung-yeon; 7–5, 6–3	(South Korea) Kim Da-bin	(Singapore) Stefanie Tan (South Korea) Yea Hyo-jung	(South Korea) Han Sung-hee (South Korea) Park Sang-hee (South Korea) Park So-hyun (South Korea) Kim Na-ri
August 29	Yeongwol, South Korea; Hard $10,000; Singles and doubles draws	(South Korea) Jung So-hee (South Korea) Park Sang-hee; 5–7, 6–4, [10–2]	(South Korea) Kim Ju-eun (South Korea) Kim Mi-ok	(Singapore) Stefanie Tan (South Korea) Yea Hyo-jung	(South Korea) Han Sung-hee (South Korea) Park Sang-hee (South Korea) Park So-hyun (South Korea) Kim Na-ri
August 29	Sion, Switzerland; Clay $10,000; Singles and doubles draws	(Italy) Lucia Bronzetti; 6–3, 7–6^{(7–5)}	(Switzerland) Karin Kennel	(Switzerland) Tamara Arnold (United Kingdom) Emily Arbuthnott	(Switzerland) Nina Stadler (Italy) Martina Colmegna (Switzerland) Leonie Küng (Switzerland) Simona Waltert
August 29	Sion, Switzerland; Clay $10,000; Singles and doubles draws	(United Kingdom) Emily Arbuthnott (Switzerland) Karin Kennel; 6–2, 6–1	(Switzerland) Leonie Küng (Switzerland) Simona Waltert	(Switzerland) Tamara Arnold (United Kingdom) Emily Arbuthnott	(Switzerland) Nina Stadler (Italy) Martina Colmegna (Switzerland) Leonie Küng (Switzerland) Simona Waltert

=== September ===
Week of	Tournament	Winner	Runners-up	Semifinalists	Quarterfinalists
September 5	Sport11 Ladies Open; Budapest, Hungary; Clay $50,000; Singles – Doubles	(Russia) Irina Khromacheva; 6–1, 6–2	(Netherlands) Cindy Burger	(Chile) Daniela Seguel (Romania) Alexandra Cadanțu	(Switzerland) Patty Schnyder (Slovakia) Michaela Hončová (Slovenia) Dalila Jakupović (Hungary) Dalma Gálfi
September 5	Sport11 Ladies Open; Budapest, Hungary; Clay $50,000; Singles – Doubles	(Netherlands) Cindy Burger (Netherlands) Arantxa Rus; 6–1, 6–4	(Hungary) Ágnes Bukta (Czech Republic) Jesika Malečková	(Chile) Daniela Seguel (Romania) Alexandra Cadanțu	(Switzerland) Patty Schnyder (Slovakia) Michaela Hončová (Slovenia) Dalila Jakupović (Hungary) Dalma Gálfi
September 5	Allianz Cup; Sofia, Bulgaria; Clay $25,000; Singles and doubles draws	(Russia) Viktoria Kamenskaya; 6–4, 6–7^{(5–7)}, 6–0	(Bulgaria) Viktoriya Tomova	(Romania) Irina Maria Bara (Belgium) Marie Benoît	(Netherlands) Quirine Lemoine (Italy) Jessica Pieri (Liechtenstein) Kathinka von Deichmann (Croatia) Tereza Mrdeža
September 5	Allianz Cup; Sofia, Bulgaria; Clay $25,000; Singles and doubles draws	(Greece) Valentini Grammatikopoulou (Netherlands) Quirine Lemoine; 6–4, 4–6, [10–6]	(North Macedonia) Lina Gjorcheska (Bulgaria) Viktoriya Tomova	(Romania) Irina Maria Bara (Belgium) Marie Benoît	(Netherlands) Quirine Lemoine (Italy) Jessica Pieri (Liechtenstein) Kathinka von Deichmann (Croatia) Tereza Mrdeža
September 5	Telavi Open; Telavi, Georgia; Clay $25,000; Singles and doubles draws	(Russia) Veronika Kudermetova; 7–5, 6–4	(Israel) Deniz Khazaniuk	(Ukraine) Dayana Yastremska (Russia) Olga Doroshina	(Turkey) Başak Eraydın (Ukraine) Olga Ianchuk (Russia) Anastasiya Komardina (Russia) Natela Dzalamidze
September 5	Telavi Open; Telavi, Georgia; Clay $25,000; Singles and doubles draws	(Russia) Natela Dzalamidze (Russia) Veronika Kudermetova; 6–4, 6–2	(Georgia (country)) Tatia Mikadze (Georgia (country)) Sofia Shapatava	(Ukraine) Dayana Yastremska (Russia) Olga Doroshina	(Turkey) Başak Eraydın (Ukraine) Olga Ianchuk (Russia) Anastasiya Komardina (Russia) Natela Dzalamidze
September 5	Engis, Belgium; Clay $10,000; Singles and doubles draws	(United States) Chiara Scholl; 6–1, 6–0	(Belgium) Déborah Kerfs	(Belgium) Catherine Chantraine (Germany) Dana Kremer	(Switzerland) Chiara Grimm (Germany) Lisa Matviyenko (Germany) Lisa-Marie Mätschke (Belgium) Magali Kempen
September 5	Engis, Belgium; Clay $10,000; Singles and doubles draws	(Belgium) Déborah Kerfs (United States) Chiara Scholl; 6–2, 6–7^{(2–7)}, [10–4]	(Switzerland) Chiara Grimm (Switzerland) Nina Stadler	(Belgium) Catherine Chantraine (Germany) Dana Kremer	(Switzerland) Chiara Grimm (Germany) Lisa Matviyenko (Germany) Lisa-Marie Mätschke (Belgium) Magali Kempen
September 5	Prague, Czech Republic; Clay $10,000; Singles and doubles draws	(Czech Republic) Magdaléna Pantůčková; 6–2, 6–7^{(4–7)}, 6–2	(Romania) Laura-Ioana Andrei	(Russia) Angelina Zhuravleva (United States) Dasha Ivanova	(Germany) Caroline Werner (Czech Republic) Miriam Kolodziejová (Croatia) Iva Primorac (Czech Republic) Tereza Kolářová
September 5	Prague, Czech Republic; Clay $10,000; Singles and doubles draws	(Canada) Petra Januskova (Russia) Angelina Zhuravleva; 6–2, 6–0	(United States) Dasha Ivanova (Croatia) Iva Primorac	(Russia) Angelina Zhuravleva (United States) Dasha Ivanova	(Germany) Caroline Werner (Czech Republic) Miriam Kolodziejová (Croatia) Iva Primorac (Czech Republic) Tereza Kolářová
September 5	Sharm el-Sheikh, Egypt; Hard $10,000; Singles and doubles draws	(Belgium) Britt Geukens; 4–6, 6–3, 6–2	(Romania) Ana Bianca Mihăilă	(Grenada) Akilah James (France) Clothilde de Bernardi	(Egypt) Ola Abou Zekry (United Kingdom) Suzy Larkin (India) Dhruthi Tatachar Venugopal (Sweden) Linnéa Malmqvist
September 5	Sharm el-Sheikh, Egypt; Hard $10,000; Singles and doubles draws	(India) Sharmada Balu (India) Dhruthi Tatachar Venugopal; 6–1, 6–3	(United Kingdom) Suzy Larkin (Sweden) Linnéa Malmqvist	(Grenada) Akilah James (France) Clothilde de Bernardi	(Egypt) Ola Abou Zekry (United Kingdom) Suzy Larkin (India) Dhruthi Tatachar Venugopal (Sweden) Linnéa Malmqvist
September 5	Kyoto, Japan; Hard (indoor) $10,000; Singles and doubles draws	(Japan) Miki Miyamura; 6–1, 6–4	(Japan) Haruna Arakawa	(Japan) Kanae Hisami (Japan) Ayano Shimizu	(Japan) Hirono Watanabe (Japan) Rika Fujiwara (Japan) Aiko Yoshitomi (Japan) Sari Baba
September 5	Kyoto, Japan; Hard (indoor) $10,000; Singles and doubles draws	(Japan) Rika Fujiwara (Japan) Miki Miyamura; 6–1, 6–2	(Japan) Risa Hasegawa (Japan) Midori Yamamoto	(Japan) Kanae Hisami (Japan) Ayano Shimizu	(Japan) Hirono Watanabe (Japan) Rika Fujiwara (Japan) Aiko Yoshitomi (Japan) Sari Baba
September 5	TEAN International; Alphen aan den Rijn, Netherlands; Clay $10,000; Singles and doubles draws	(Netherlands) Chayenne Ewijk; 7–5, 7–5	(Netherlands) Suzan Lamens	(Germany) Lena Rüffer (Germany) Julyette Steur	(Netherlands) Erika Vogelsang (Spain) Yvonne Cavallé Reimers (United Kingdom) Eden Silva (Netherlands) Nina Kruijer
September 5	TEAN International; Alphen aan den Rijn, Netherlands; Clay $10,000; Singles and doubles draws	(Netherlands) Nina Kruijer (Netherlands) Suzan Lamens; 6–0, 3–6, [10–5]	(Netherlands) Chayenne Ewijk (Netherlands) Rosalie van der Hoek	(Germany) Lena Rüffer (Germany) Julyette Steur	(Netherlands) Erika Vogelsang (Spain) Yvonne Cavallé Reimers (United Kingdom) Eden Silva (Netherlands) Nina Kruijer
September 5	Ponta Delgada, Portugal; Hard $10,000; Singles and doubles draws	(Spain) Alba Carrillo Marín; 6–3, 3–6, 6–3	(Romania) Ioana Loredana Roșca	(Cambodia) Andrea Ka (Portugal) Maria João Koehler	(Spain) María Gutiérrez Carrasco (France) Amandine Cazeaux (Germany) Katharina Hering (United Kingdom) Jazzamay Drew
September 5	Ponta Delgada, Portugal; Hard $10,000; Singles and doubles draws	(Portugal) Inês Murta (Romania) Ioana Loredana Roșca; 2–6, 6–4, [11–9]	(Germany) Katharina Hering (Cambodia) Andrea Ka	(Cambodia) Andrea Ka (Portugal) Maria João Koehler	(Spain) María Gutiérrez Carrasco (France) Amandine Cazeaux (Germany) Katharina Hering (United Kingdom) Jazzamay Drew
September 5	Yeongwol, South Korea; Hard $10,000; Singles and doubles draws	(South Korea) Kim Na-ri; 6–2, 6–2	(China) Zhao Di	(South Korea) Ahn Yu-jin (South Korea) Park Sang-hee	(United States) Hanna Chang (South Korea) Han Sung-hee (South Korea) Jeong Yeong-won (South Korea) Jeong Su-nam
September 5	Yeongwol, South Korea; Hard $10,000; Singles and doubles draws	(South Korea) Kim Na-ri (South Korea) Yu Min-hwa; 7–6^{(7–2)}, 6–2	(South Korea) Jung So-hee (South Korea) Park Sang-hee	(South Korea) Ahn Yu-jin (South Korea) Park Sang-hee	(United States) Hanna Chang (South Korea) Han Sung-hee (South Korea) Jeong Yeong-won (South Korea) Jeong Su-nam
September 5	Hammamet, Tunisia; Clay $10,000; Singles and doubles draws	(Sweden) Fanny Östlund; 6–4, 6–2	(Croatia) Ana Savić	(Italy) Angelica Moratelli (Italy) Marianna Natali	(Croatia) Mariana Dražić (United States) Jessica Ho (Italy) Miriana Tona (Russia) Vasilisa Aponasenko
September 5	Hammamet, Tunisia; Clay $10,000; Singles and doubles draws	(France) Fiona Codino (Belgium) Mathilde Devits; 7–6^{(7–2)}, 5–7, [10–5]	(Romania) Cristina Adamescu (Croatia) Mariana Dražić	(Italy) Angelica Moratelli (Italy) Marianna Natali	(Croatia) Mariana Dražić (United States) Jessica Ho (Italy) Miriana Tona (Russia) Vasilisa Aponasenko
September 5	Bucha, Ukraine; Clay $10,000; Singles and doubles draws	(Ukraine) Mariya Koryttseva; 4–0, ret.	(Moldova) Alexandra Perper	(Ukraine) Anastasiya Fedoryshyn (Ukraine) Ganna Poznikhirenko	(Ukraine) Veronika Kapshay (Ukraine) Anastasiya Shoshyna (Ukraine) Oleksandra Andrieieva (Belarus) Ilona Kremen
September 5	Bucha, Ukraine; Clay $10,000; Singles and doubles draws	(Belarus) Ilona Kremen (Ukraine) Ganna Poznikhirenko; 6–3, 6–2	(Ukraine) Veronika Kapshay (Ukraine) Anastasiya Shoshyna	(Ukraine) Anastasiya Fedoryshyn (Ukraine) Ganna Poznikhirenko	(Ukraine) Veronika Kapshay (Ukraine) Anastasiya Shoshyna (Ukraine) Oleksandra Andrieieva (Belarus) Ilona Kremen
September 12	Engie Open de Biarritz; Biarritz, France; Clay $100,000; Singles – Doubles	(Slovakia) Rebecca Šramková; 6–3, 4–6, 6–1	(Italy) Martina Trevisan	(France) Chloé Paquet (Romania) Sorana Cîrstea	(France) Pauline Parmentier (Russia) Irina Khromacheva (Germany) Carina Witthöft (Russia) Veronika Kudermetova
September 12	Engie Open de Biarritz; Biarritz, France; Clay $100,000; Singles – Doubles	(Russia) Irina Khromacheva (Ukraine) Maryna Zanevska; 4–6, 7–5, [10–8]	(Sweden) Cornelia Lister (Serbia) Nina Stojanović	(France) Chloé Paquet (Romania) Sorana Cîrstea	(France) Pauline Parmentier (Russia) Irina Khromacheva (Germany) Carina Witthöft (Russia) Veronika Kudermetova
September 12	Zhuhai ITF Women's Pro Circuit; Zhuhai, China; Hard $50,000; Singles – Doubles	(Belarus) Olga Govortsova; 6–1, 6–2	(Turkey) İpek Soylu	(China) Lu Jiajing (Uzbekistan) Nigina Abduraimova	(Thailand) Nicha Lertpitaksinchai (Belarus) Vera Lapko (Chinese Taipei) Chang Kai-chen (Germany) Tatjana Maria
September 12	Zhuhai ITF Women's Pro Circuit; Zhuhai, China; Hard $50,000; Singles – Doubles	(India) Ankita Raina (United Kingdom) Emily Webley-Smith; 6–4, 6–4	(China) Guo Hanyu (China) Jiang Xinyu	(China) Lu Jiajing (Uzbekistan) Nigina Abduraimova	(Thailand) Nicha Lertpitaksinchai (Belarus) Vera Lapko (Chinese Taipei) Chang Kai-chen (Germany) Tatjana Maria
September 12	One Love Tennis Open; Atlanta, United States; Hard $50,000; Singles – Doubles	(Belgium) Elise Mertens; 6–4, 6–2	(United States) Melanie Oudin	(United States) Kristie Ahn (France) Tessah Andrianjafitrimo	(Portugal) Michelle Larcher de Brito (Netherlands) Michaëlla Krajicek (United Kingdom) Laura Robson (Ukraine) Elizaveta Ianchuk
September 12	One Love Tennis Open; Atlanta, United States; Hard $50,000; Singles – Doubles	(United States) Ingrid Neel (Brazil) Luisa Stefani; 4–6, 6–4, [10–5]	(United States) Alexandra Stevenson (United States) Taylor Townsend	(United States) Kristie Ahn (France) Tessah Andrianjafitrimo	(Portugal) Michelle Larcher de Brito (Netherlands) Michaëlla Krajicek (United Kingdom) Laura Robson (Ukraine) Elizaveta Ianchuk
September 12	Izida Cup; Dobrich, Bulgaria; Clay $25,000; Singles and doubles draws	(Liechtenstein) Kathinka von Deichmann; 6–0, 6–3	(Bulgaria) Isabella Shinikova	(North Macedonia) Lina Gjorcheska (Norway) Melanie Stokke	(Romania) Cristina Ene (Germany) Laura Schaeder (Romania) Nicoleta Dascălu (Bulgaria) Viktoriya Tomova
September 12	Izida Cup; Dobrich, Bulgaria; Clay $25,000; Singles and doubles draws	(North Macedonia) Lina Gjorcheska (Bulgaria) Isabella Shinikova; 6–7^{(13–15)}, 6–2, [10–6]	(Germany) Laura Schaeder (Norway) Melanie Stokke	(North Macedonia) Lina Gjorcheska (Norway) Melanie Stokke	(Romania) Cristina Ene (Germany) Laura Schaeder (Romania) Nicoleta Dascălu (Bulgaria) Viktoriya Tomova
September 12	Hódmezővásárhely, Hungary; Clay $25,000; Singles and doubles draws	(Romania) Irina Maria Bara; 7–5, 6–4	(Serbia) Dejana Radanović	(Croatia) Tereza Mrdeža (Czech Republic) Gabriela Pantůčková	(Serbia) Ivana Jorović (Switzerland) Conny Perrin (Czech Republic) Jesika Malečková (Croatia) Tena Lukas
September 12	Hódmezővásárhely, Hungary; Clay $25,000; Singles and doubles draws	(Switzerland) Conny Perrin (Slovakia) Chantal Škamlová; 6–4, 6–2	(Romania) Irina Maria Bara (Romania) Elena Bogdan	(Croatia) Tereza Mrdeža (Czech Republic) Gabriela Pantůčková	(Serbia) Ivana Jorović (Switzerland) Conny Perrin (Czech Republic) Jesika Malečková (Croatia) Tena Lukas
September 12	Bucha, Ukraine; Clay $25,000; Singles and doubles draws	(Russia) Anastasiya Komardina; 6–4, 6–3	(Israel) Deniz Khazaniuk	(Ukraine) Olga Ianchuk (Russia) Viktoria Kamenskaya	(Ukraine) Maryna Chernyshova (Russia) Olga Doroshina (Hungary) Vanda Lukács (Switzerland) Patty Schnyder
September 12	Bucha, Ukraine; Clay $25,000; Singles and doubles draws	(Russia) Valentyna Ivakhnenko (Russia) Anastasiya Komardina; 6–3, 6–1	(Romania) Mihaela Buzărnescu (Moldova) Alexandra Perper	(Ukraine) Olga Ianchuk (Russia) Viktoria Kamenskaya	(Ukraine) Maryna Chernyshova (Russia) Olga Doroshina (Hungary) Vanda Lukács (Switzerland) Patty Schnyder
September 12	Lubbock, United States; Hard $25,000; Singles and doubles draws	(Slovakia) Viktória Kužmová; 6–0, 7–5	(United Kingdom) Freya Christie	(United States) Ashley Kratzer (Montenegro) Ana Veselinović	(United Kingdom) Katie Swan (United Kingdom) Katie Boulter (United Kingdom) Harriet Dart (Germany) Anna Zaja
September 12	Lubbock, United States; Hard $25,000; Singles and doubles draws	(United States) Emina Bektas (United States) Catherine Harrison; 6–3, 6–4	(Bosnia and Herzegovina) Ema Burgić Bucko (Mexico) Renata Zarazúa	(United States) Ashley Kratzer (Montenegro) Ana Veselinović	(United Kingdom) Katie Swan (United Kingdom) Katie Boulter (United Kingdom) Harriet Dart (Germany) Anna Zaja
September 12	Říčany, Czech Republic; Clay $10,000; Singles and doubles draws	(Germany) Katharina Gerlach; 7–5, 6–2	(Czech Republic) Miriam Kolodziejová	(Czech Republic) Karolína Čechová (Czech Republic) Barbora Miklová	(Ukraine) Anastasia Zarytska (Czech Republic) Tereza Procházková (Croatia) Iva Primorac (Czech Republic) Magdaléna Pantůčková
September 12	Říčany, Czech Republic; Clay $10,000; Singles and doubles draws	(Czech Republic) Nikola Novotná (Czech Republic) Nikola Tomanová; 6–1, 6–0	(Czech Republic) Aneta Kladivová (Czech Republic) Sonja Křtěnová	(Czech Republic) Karolína Čechová (Czech Republic) Barbora Miklová	(Ukraine) Anastasia Zarytska (Czech Republic) Tereza Procházková (Croatia) Iva Primorac (Czech Republic) Magdaléna Pantůčková
September 12	Sharm el-Sheikh, Egypt; Hard $10,000; Singles and doubles draws	(Romania) Ana Bianca Mihăilă; 3–6, 7–5, 6–4	(India) Zeel Desai	(India) Riya Bhatia (Romania) Elena-Teodora Cadar	(Italy) Giada Clerici (India) Eetee Maheta (France) Clothilde de Bernardi (Grenada) Akilah James
September 12	Sharm el-Sheikh, Egypt; Hard $10,000; Singles and doubles draws	(Romania) Elena-Teodora Cadar (Belgium) Britt Geukens; 6–3, 6–1	(Romania) Ana Bianca Mihăilă (India) Shweta Chandra Rana	(India) Riya Bhatia (Romania) Elena-Teodora Cadar	(Italy) Giada Clerici (India) Eetee Maheta (France) Clothilde de Bernardi (Grenada) Akilah James
September 12	Ashkelon, Israel; Hard $10,000; Singles and doubles draws	(France) Jennifer Zerbone; 7–6^{(7–5)}, 3–6, 6–2	(Israel) Vlada Ekshibarova	(Israel) Keren Shlomo (Russia) Ekaterina Kazionova	(Belarus) Anastasiya Shleptsova (Australia) Alexandra Walters (United States) Mia Rabinowitz (Russia) Valeriya Yushchenko
September 12	Ashkelon, Israel; Hard $10,000; Singles and doubles draws	(Israel) Vlada Ekshibarova (United States) Madeleine Kobelt; 4–6, 7–5, [10–8]	(Israel) Alona Pushkarevsky (Israel) Keren Shlomo	(Israel) Keren Shlomo (Russia) Ekaterina Kazionova	(Belarus) Anastasiya Shleptsova (Australia) Alexandra Walters (United States) Mia Rabinowitz (Russia) Valeriya Yushchenko
September 12	Pula, Italy; Clay $10,000; Singles and doubles draws	(Italy) Alice Balducci; 6–4, 6–1	(Switzerland) Tess Sugnaux	(Belgium) Kimberley Zimmermann (Italy) Verena Hofer	(Italy) Alessia Dario (Italy) Alessia Piran (Bosnia and Herzegovina) Jelena Simić (Italy) Dalila Spiteri
September 12	Pula, Italy; Clay $10,000; Singles and doubles draws	(Italy) Alessia Dario (Italy) Sara Marcionni; 7–6^{(8–6)}, 6–2	(Netherlands) Nikki Luttikhuis (Netherlands) Claire Verwerda	(Belgium) Kimberley Zimmermann (Italy) Verena Hofer	(Italy) Alessia Dario (Italy) Alessia Piran (Bosnia and Herzegovina) Jelena Simić (Italy) Dalila Spiteri
September 12	Pétange, Luxembourg; Hard (indoor) $10,000; Singles and doubles draws	(France) Elixane Lechemia; 6–3, 6–0	(Belgium) Magali Kempen	(Belgium) Hélène Scholsen (Germany) Romy Kölzer	(Germany) Carolin Schmidt (Poland) Justyna Jegiołka (Belgium) Klaartje Liebens (Netherlands) Chayenne Ewijk
September 12	Pétange, Luxembourg; Hard (indoor) $10,000; Singles and doubles draws	(Netherlands) Chayenne Ewijk (Netherlands) Rosalie van der Hoek; 7–6^{(8–6)}, 6–3	(Poland) Justyna Jegiołka (Belgium) Magali Kempen	(Belgium) Hélène Scholsen (Germany) Romy Kölzer	(Germany) Carolin Schmidt (Poland) Justyna Jegiołka (Belgium) Klaartje Liebens (Netherlands) Chayenne Ewijk
September 12	Ponta Delgada, Portugal; Hard $10,000; Singles and doubles draws	(Portugal) Inês Murta; 6–4, 3–6, 7–6^{(9–7)}	(Portugal) Maria João Koehler	(Spain) Alba Carrillo Marín (Portugal) Francisca Jorge	(United States) Desirae Krawczyk (France) Amandine Cazeaux (Russia) Natalia Orlova (United Kingdom) Emma Hurst
September 12	Ponta Delgada, Portugal; Hard $10,000; Singles and doubles draws	(Germany) Katharina Hering (Cambodia) Andrea Ka; 6–3, 6–3	(United States) Desirae Krawczyk (Russia) Elina Vikhryanova	(Spain) Alba Carrillo Marín (Portugal) Francisca Jorge	(United States) Desirae Krawczyk (France) Amandine Cazeaux (Russia) Natalia Orlova (United Kingdom) Emma Hurst
September 12	Madrid, Spain; Hard $10,000; Singles and doubles draws	(Spain) Nuria Párrizas Díaz; 7–6^{(7–5)}, 6–3	(Sweden) Jacqueline Cabaj Awad	(Sweden) Kajsa Rinaldo Persson (Australia) Isabelle Wallace	(Chile) Fernanda Brito (Spain) Ainhoa Atucha Gómez (Romania) Ioana Pietroiu (Spain) Arabela Fernández Rabener
September 12	Madrid, Spain; Hard $10,000; Singles and doubles draws	(Spain) Arabela Fernández Rabener (Spain) María Martínez Martínez; 6–3, 6–1	(France) Mathilde Armitano (Argentina) Melina Ferrero	(Sweden) Kajsa Rinaldo Persson (Australia) Isabelle Wallace	(Chile) Fernanda Brito (Spain) Ainhoa Atucha Gómez (Romania) Ioana Pietroiu (Spain) Arabela Fernández Rabener
September 12	Hammamet, Tunisia; Clay $10,000; Singles and doubles draws	(Belarus) Sviatlana Pirazhenka; 6–1, 6–0	(Argentina) Sofía Luini	(Italy) Angelica Moratelli (United States) Jessica Ho	(Slovakia) Barbara Kötelesová (Croatia) Mariana Dražić (Croatia) Ana Savić (Italy) Miriana Tona
September 12	Hammamet, Tunisia; Clay $10,000; Singles and doubles draws	(France) Kassandra Davesne (Slovakia) Barbara Kötelesová; Walkover	(Italy) Angelica Moratelli (Belarus) Sviatlana Pirazhenka	(Italy) Angelica Moratelli (United States) Jessica Ho	(Slovakia) Barbara Kötelesová (Croatia) Mariana Dražić (Croatia) Ana Savić (Italy) Miriana Tona
September 19	Neva Cup; Saint Petersburg, Russia; Hard (indoor) $100,000; Singles – Doubles	(Russia) Natalia Vikhlyantseva; 6–1, 6–2	(Croatia) Donna Vekić	(Russia) Irina Khromacheva (Belarus) Aryna Sabalenka	(Greece) Valentini Grammatikopoulou (Russia) Alla Kudryavtseva (Serbia) Vesna Dolonc (Russia) Evgeniya Rodina
September 19	Neva Cup; Saint Petersburg, Russia; Hard (indoor) $100,000; Singles – Doubles	(Russia) Maria Marfutina (Russia) Anna Morgina; 6–2, 6–3	(Romania) Raluca Olaru (Russia) Alena Tarasova	(Russia) Irina Khromacheva (Belarus) Aryna Sabalenka	(Greece) Valentini Grammatikopoulou (Russia) Alla Kudryavtseva (Serbia) Vesna Dolonc (Russia) Evgeniya Rodina
September 19	Coleman Vision Tennis Championships; Albuquerque, United States; Hard $75,000; Singles – Doubles	(Luxembourg) Mandy Minella; 6–4, 7–5	(Paraguay) Verónica Cepede Royg	(Canada) Aleksandra Wozniak (Belgium) Alison Van Uytvanck	(Czech Republic) Marie Bouzková (Poland) Paula Kania (Paraguay) Montserrat González (Netherlands) Michaëlla Krajicek
September 19	Coleman Vision Tennis Championships; Albuquerque, United States; Hard $75,000; Singles – Doubles	(Netherlands) Michaëlla Krajicek (United States) Maria Sanchez; 6–2, 6–4	(Belgium) Elise Mertens (Luxembourg) Mandy Minella	(Canada) Aleksandra Wozniak (Belgium) Alison Van Uytvanck	(Czech Republic) Marie Bouzková (Poland) Paula Kania (Paraguay) Montserrat González (Netherlands) Michaëlla Krajicek
September 19	L'Open Emeraude Solaire de Saint-Malo; Saint-Malo, France; Clay $50,000+H; Singles – Doubles	(Ukraine) Maryna Zanevska; 6–1, 6–3	(Italy) Camilla Rosatello	(Spain) Sílvia Soler Espinosa (France) Fiona Ferro	(Russia) Varvara Flink (Russia) Viktoria Kamenskaya (France) Chloé Paquet (Serbia) Nina Stojanović
September 19	L'Open Emeraude Solaire de Saint-Malo; Saint-Malo, France; Clay $50,000+H; Singles – Doubles	(North Macedonia) Lina Gjorcheska (Latvia) Diāna Marcinkēviča; 3–6, 6–3, [10–8]	(Romania) Alexandra Cadanțu (Romania) Jaqueline Cristian	(Spain) Sílvia Soler Espinosa (France) Fiona Ferro	(Russia) Varvara Flink (Russia) Viktoria Kamenskaya (France) Chloé Paquet (Serbia) Nina Stojanović
September 19	Tweed Heads, Australia; Hard $25,000; Singles and doubles draws	(Australia) Lizette Cabrera; 6–3, 5–7, 6–2	(Australia) Destanee Aiava	(United States) Jennifer Elie (Australia) Olivia Rogowska	(Slovakia) Tereza Mihalíková (Australia) Viktorija Rajicic (Australia) Angelique Svinos (Australia) Abbie Myers
September 19	Tweed Heads, Australia; Hard $25,000; Singles and doubles draws	(Australia) Monique Adamczak (Australia) Olivia Rogowska; 7–6^{(8–6)}, 7–6^{(7–3)}	(Australia) Naiktha Bains (Australia) Abbie Myers	(United States) Jennifer Elie (Australia) Olivia Rogowska	(Slovakia) Tereza Mihalíková (Australia) Viktorija Rajicic (Australia) Angelique Svinos (Australia) Abbie Myers
September 19	Royal Cup NLB Montenegro; Podgorica, Montenegro; Clay $25,000; Singles and doubles draws	(Netherlands) Quirine Lemoine; 7–5, 6–1	(Argentina) Paula Ormaechea	(Slovenia) Tadeja Majerič (Slovenia) Tamara Zidanšek	(Serbia) Ivana Jorović (Romania) Irina Maria Bara (Italy) Jessica Pieri (Croatia) Tena Lukas
September 19	Royal Cup NLB Montenegro; Podgorica, Montenegro; Clay $25,000; Singles and doubles draws	(Bosnia and Herzegovina) Anita Husarić (Netherlands) Quirine Lemoine; 3–6, 6–4, [10–4]	(Serbia) Ivana Jorović (Switzerland) Xenia Knoll	(Slovenia) Tadeja Majerič (Slovenia) Tamara Zidanšek	(Serbia) Ivana Jorović (Romania) Irina Maria Bara (Italy) Jessica Pieri (Croatia) Tena Lukas
September 19	Hua Hin, Thailand; Hard $25,000; Singles and doubles draws	(China) Gao Xinyu; 6–2, 1–6, 7–5	(Japan) Shiho Akita	(Thailand) Noppawan Lertcheewakarn (Poland) Katarzyna Kawa	(China) Gai Ao (India) Karman Thandi (Thailand) Bunyawi Thamchaiwat (Thailand) Plobrung Plipuech
September 19	Hua Hin, Thailand; Hard $25,000; Singles and doubles draws	(Brazil) Laura Pigossi (Russia) Yana Sizikova; 6–3, 2–6, [10–4]	(China) Wei Zhanlan (China) Zhao Qianqian	(Thailand) Noppawan Lertcheewakarn (Poland) Katarzyna Kawa	(China) Gai Ao (India) Karman Thandi (Thailand) Bunyawi Thamchaiwat (Thailand) Plobrung Plipuech
September 19	Brno, Czech Republic; Clay $10,000; Singles and doubles draws	(Czech Republic) Miriam Kolodziejová; 6–3, 3–6, 6–4	(Czech Republic) Diana Šumová	(Poland) Maja Chwalińska (Germany) Caroline Werner	(Czech Republic) Barbora Krejčíková (Czech Republic) Monika Kilnarová (Czech Republic) Nikola Tomanová (Czech Republic) Barbora Miklová
September 19	Brno, Czech Republic; Clay $10,000; Singles and doubles draws	(Czech Republic) Aneta Kladivová (Czech Republic) Aneta Laboutková; 7–6^{(7–5)}, 3–6, [12–10]	(Poland) Maja Chwalińska (Poland) Paulina Czarnik	(Poland) Maja Chwalińska (Germany) Caroline Werner	(Czech Republic) Barbora Krejčíková (Czech Republic) Monika Kilnarová (Czech Republic) Nikola Tomanová (Czech Republic) Barbora Miklová
September 19	Sharm el-Sheikh, Egypt; Hard $10,000; Singles and doubles draws	(India) Riya Bhatia; 3–6, 6–4, 6–0	(Romania) Ana Bianca Mihăilă	(United Kingdom) Mirabelle Njoze (Belgium) Britt Geukens	(Argentina) Guadalupe Pérez Rojas (Guatemala) Kirsten-Andrea Weedon (Romania) Elena-Teodora Cadar (India) Sri Peddi Reddy
September 19	Sharm el-Sheikh, Egypt; Hard $10,000; Singles and doubles draws	(Romania) Elena-Teodora Cadar (Argentina) Guadalupe Pérez Rojas; 7–5, 7–6^{(7–5)}	(Romania) Ana Bianca Mihăilă (India) Shweta Chandra Rana	(United Kingdom) Mirabelle Njoze (Belgium) Britt Geukens	(Argentina) Guadalupe Pérez Rojas (Guatemala) Kirsten-Andrea Weedon (Romania) Elena-Teodora Cadar (India) Sri Peddi Reddy
September 19	Kiryat Gat, Israel; Hard $10,000; Singles and doubles draws	(Turkey) Melis Sezer; 6–2, 6–7^{(4–7)}, 6–3	(Belgium) Hélène Scholsen	(Israel) Vlada Ekshibarova (Russia) Ekaterina Kazionova	(United States) Madeleine Kobelt (Israel) Ofri Lankri (France) Jennifer Zerbone (Israel) Shir Azran
September 19	Kiryat Gat, Israel; Hard $10,000; Singles and doubles draws	(Russia) Ekaterina Kazionova (United States) Madeleine Kobelt; 7–6^{(7–5)}, 6–3	(Israel) Vlada Ekshibarova (Turkey) Melis Sezer	(Israel) Vlada Ekshibarova (Russia) Ekaterina Kazionova	(United States) Madeleine Kobelt (Israel) Ofri Lankri (France) Jennifer Zerbone (Israel) Shir Azran
September 19	Pula, Italy; Clay $10,000; Singles and doubles draws	(Switzerland) Ylena In-Albon; 7–5, 6–2	(Italy) Alice Balducci	(Switzerland) Tess Sugnaux (Bosnia and Herzegovina) Jelena Simić	(Switzerland) Naïma Karamoko (Italy) Tatiana Pieri (Netherlands) Donnaroza Gouvernante (Canada) Charlotte Robillard-Millette
September 19	Pula, Italy; Clay $10,000; Singles and doubles draws	(Italy) Tatiana Pieri (Italy) Lucrezia Stefanini; 6–4, 6–0	(Italy) Alice Balducci (Italy) Marcella Cucca	(Switzerland) Tess Sugnaux (Bosnia and Herzegovina) Jelena Simić	(Switzerland) Naïma Karamoko (Italy) Tatiana Pieri (Netherlands) Donnaroza Gouvernante (Canada) Charlotte Robillard-Millette
September 19	Shymkent, Kazakhstan; Clay $10,000; Singles and doubles draws	(Kazakhstan) Kamila Kerimbayeva; 7–5, 6–3	(Russia) Daria Kruzhkova	(Russia) Daria Lodikova (Uzbekistan) Arina Folts	(Russia) Polina Novikova (Belarus) Vera Sakalouskaya (Russia) Anna Ukolova (Kazakhstan) Alexandra Grinchishina
September 19	Shymkent, Kazakhstan; Clay $10,000; Singles and doubles draws	(Russia) Yanina Darishina (Russia) Daria Lodikova; 6–3, 6–3	(Russia) Anna Iakovleva (Kazakhstan) Zhibek Kulambayeva	(Russia) Daria Lodikova (Uzbekistan) Arina Folts	(Russia) Polina Novikova (Belarus) Vera Sakalouskaya (Russia) Anna Ukolova (Kazakhstan) Alexandra Grinchishina
September 19	Madrid, Spain; Hard $10,000; Singles and doubles draws	(Spain) Nuria Párrizas Díaz; 6–4, 3–6, 7–5	(Spain) Cristina Bucșa	(Spain) Rocío de la Torre Sánchez (Australia) Isabelle Wallace	(Spain) Irene Burillo Escorihuela (Spain) Arabela Fernández Rabener (Spain) María Gutiérrez Carrasco (Spain) Lidia Moreno Arias
September 19	Madrid, Spain; Hard $10,000; Singles and doubles draws	(Spain) Arabela Fernández Rabener (Ecuador) Charlotte Römer; 6–2, 2–6, [10–4]	(Spain) Ainhoa Atucha Gómez (Spain) María José Luque Moreno	(Spain) Rocío de la Torre Sánchez (Australia) Isabelle Wallace	(Spain) Irene Burillo Escorihuela (Spain) Arabela Fernández Rabener (Spain) María Gutiérrez Carrasco (Spain) Lidia Moreno Arias
September 19	Hammamet, Tunisia; Clay $10,000; Singles and doubles draws	(Germany) Katharina Hobgarski; 6–2, 6–2	(Chile) Fernanda Brito	(Venezuela) Andrea Gámiz (Belarus) Sviatlana Pirazhenka	(United States) Jessica Ho (Switzerland) Karin Kennel (Romania) Cristina Adamescu (Italy) Angelica Moratelli
September 19	Hammamet, Tunisia; Clay $10,000; Singles and doubles draws	(Belgium) Catherine Chantraine (Belarus) Sviatlana Pirazhenka; 6–4, 7–5	(Romania) Cristina Adamescu (Switzerland) Karin Kennel	(Venezuela) Andrea Gámiz (Belarus) Sviatlana Pirazhenka	(United States) Jessica Ho (Switzerland) Karin Kennel (Romania) Cristina Adamescu (Italy) Angelica Moratelli
September 19	Nottingham, United Kingdom; Hard $10,000; Singles and doubles draws	(France) Margot Yerolymos; 7–5, 6–1	(United Kingdom) Eden Silva	(Germany) Luisa Marie Huber (United Kingdom) Victoria Allen	(United Kingdom) Alicia Barnett (United Kingdom) Lauryn John-Baptiste (United Kingdom) Olivia Nicholls (United Kingdom) Gemma Heath
September 19	Nottingham, United Kingdom; Hard $10,000; Singles and doubles draws	(United Kingdom) Sarah Beth Grey (United Kingdom) Olivia Nicholls; 6–2, 6–4	(United States) Dasha Ivanova (France) Margot Yerolymos	(Germany) Luisa Marie Huber (United Kingdom) Victoria Allen	(United Kingdom) Alicia Barnett (United Kingdom) Lauryn John-Baptiste (United Kingdom) Olivia Nicholls (United Kingdom) Gemma Heath
September 26	Red Rock Pro Open; Las Vegas, United States; Hard $50,000; Singles – Doubles	(Belgium) Alison Van Uytvanck; 3–6, 7–6^{(7–4)}, 6–2	(United States) Sofia Kenin	(Hungary) Fanny Stollár (Argentina) Nadia Podoroska	(United States) Taylor Townsend (Serbia) Jovana Jakšić (United States) Maria Sanchez (United States) Sachia Vickery
September 26	Red Rock Pro Open; Las Vegas, United States; Hard $50,000; Singles – Doubles	(Netherlands) Michaëlla Krajicek (United States) Maria Sanchez; 7–5, 6–1	(United States) Jamie Loeb (South Africa) Chanel Simmonds	(Hungary) Fanny Stollár (Argentina) Nadia Podoroska	(United States) Taylor Townsend (Serbia) Jovana Jakšić (United States) Maria Sanchez (United States) Sachia Vickery
September 26	Brisbane, Australia; Hard $25,000; Singles and doubles draws	(Australia) Lizette Cabrera; 6–2, 6–4	(Slovakia) Viktória Kužmová	(Papua New Guinea) Abigail Tere-Apisah (United States) Jennifer Elie	(Italy) Georgia Brescia (Japan) Eri Hozumi (Japan) Miyu Kato (Israel) Julia Glushko
September 26	Brisbane, Australia; Hard $25,000; Singles and doubles draws	(Australia) Naiktha Bains (Papua New Guinea) Abigail Tere-Apisah; 6–7^{(4–7)}, 6–2, [10–3]	(Israel) Julia Glushko (China) Liu Fangzhou	(Papua New Guinea) Abigail Tere-Apisah (United States) Jennifer Elie	(Italy) Georgia Brescia (Japan) Eri Hozumi (Japan) Miyu Kato (Israel) Julia Glushko
September 26	Clermont-Ferrand, France; Hard (indoor) $25,000; Singles and doubles draws	(Netherlands) Richèl Hogenkamp; 6–4, 6–2	(Italy) Jasmine Paolini	(France) Océane Dodin (Latvia) Diāna Marcinkēviča	(Netherlands) Lesley Kerkhove (France) Manon Arcangioli (France) Théo Gravouil (Brazil) Beatriz Haddad Maia
September 26	Clermont-Ferrand, France; Hard (indoor) $25,000; Singles and doubles draws	(Spain) Georgina García Pérez (Spain) Olga Sáez Larra; 6–2, 3–6, [10–2]	(France) Manon Arcangioli (Croatia) Silvia Njirić	(France) Océane Dodin (Latvia) Diāna Marcinkēviča	(Netherlands) Lesley Kerkhove (France) Manon Arcangioli (France) Théo Gravouil (Brazil) Beatriz Haddad Maia
September 26	Iizuka, Japan; Hard $25,000; Singles and doubles draws	(Chinese Taipei) Chang Kai-chen; 6–3, 6–4	(South Korea) Jang Su-jeong	(Japan) Riko Sawayanagi (Japan) Yuuki Tanaka	(Japan) Akiko Omae (Japan) Ayano Shimizu (United States) Tori Kinard (Japan) Chihiro Muramatsu
September 26	Iizuka, Japan; Hard $25,000; Singles and doubles draws	(Japan) Kanae Hisami (Japan) Kotomi Takahata; 6–2, 3–6, [10–4]	(Japan) Miharu Imanishi (Japan) Akiko Omae	(Japan) Riko Sawayanagi (Japan) Yuuki Tanaka	(Japan) Akiko Omae (Japan) Ayano Shimizu (United States) Tori Kinard (Japan) Chihiro Muramatsu
September 26	Hua Hin, Thailand; Hard $25,000; Singles and doubles draws	(Netherlands) Arantxa Rus; 3–6, 7–6^{(7–4)}, 7–6^{(7–3)}	(Thailand) Nicha Lertpitaksinchai	(China) Gao Xinyu (Bulgaria) Aleksandrina Naydenova	(Japan) Shiho Akita (China) Tian Ran (Poland) Katarzyna Kawa (China) Lu Jiajing
September 26	Hua Hin, Thailand; Hard $25,000; Singles and doubles draws	(Poland) Katarzyna Kawa (Brazil) Laura Pigossi; 7–5, 6–7^{(4–7)}, [10–6]	(Thailand) Kamonwan Buayam (Chinese Taipei) Lee Pei-chi	(China) Gao Xinyu (Bulgaria) Aleksandrina Naydenova	(Japan) Shiho Akita (China) Tian Ran (Poland) Katarzyna Kawa (China) Lu Jiajing
September 26	Stillwater, United States; Hard $25,000; Singles and doubles draws	(United States) Danielle Collins; 1–0, ret.	(United States) Caroline Dolehide	(Ukraine) Yuliya Beygelzimer (Italy) Bianca Turati	(Canada) Aleksandra Wozniak (Mexico) Victoria Rodríguez (United States) Ronit Yurovsky (Croatia) Ana Vrljić
September 26	Stillwater, United States; Hard $25,000; Singles and doubles draws	(United States) Emina Bektas (United States) Ronit Yurovsky; 6–4, 6–7^{(6–8)}, [10–6]	(Mexico) Giuliana Olmos (Mexico) Nazari Urbina	(Ukraine) Yuliya Beygelzimer (Italy) Bianca Turati	(Canada) Aleksandra Wozniak (Mexico) Victoria Rodríguez (United States) Ronit Yurovsky (Croatia) Ana Vrljić
September 26	Sozopol, Bulgaria; Hard $10,000; Singles and doubles draws	(Serbia) Dejana Radanović; 4–0, ret.	(Romania) Andreea Roșca	(Romania) Oana Gavrilă (Germany) Lisa Matviyenko	(Czech Republic) Kateřina Kramperová (Ukraine) Alona Fomina (Bulgaria) Petia Arshinkova (Greece) Despina Papamichail
September 26	Sozopol, Bulgaria; Hard $10,000; Singles and doubles draws	(Bulgaria) Petia Arshinkova (Serbia) Dejana Radanović; 6–1, 6–3	(Czech Republic) Kateřina Kramperová (Russia) Angelina Zhuravleva	(Romania) Oana Gavrilă (Germany) Lisa Matviyenko	(Czech Republic) Kateřina Kramperová (Ukraine) Alona Fomina (Bulgaria) Petia Arshinkova (Greece) Despina Papamichail
September 26	Sharm el-Sheikh, Egypt; Hard $10,000; Singles and doubles draws	(Russia) Anna Morgina; 6–4, 6–0	(Bosnia and Herzegovina) Dea Herdželaš	(Egypt) Ola Abou Zekry (Argentina) Guadalupe Pérez Rojas	(India) Zeel Desai (Romania) Ana Bianca Mihăilă (Republic of Ireland) Jenny Claffey (India) Eetee Maheta
September 26	Sharm el-Sheikh, Egypt; Hard $10,000; Singles and doubles draws	(Egypt) Ola Abou Zekry (India) Zeel Desai; 7–5, 6–4	(United Kingdom) Suzy Larkin (Malaysia) Theiviya Selvarajoo	(Egypt) Ola Abou Zekry (Argentina) Guadalupe Pérez Rojas	(India) Zeel Desai (Romania) Ana Bianca Mihăilă (Republic of Ireland) Jenny Claffey (India) Eetee Maheta
September 26	Tiberias, Israel; Hard $10,000; Singles and doubles draws	(Turkey) Melis Sezer; 6–3, 6–3	(Israel) Vlada Ekshibarova	(Russia) Ekaterina Kazionova (Belgium) Hélène Scholsen	(United States) Madeleine Kobelt (Sweden) Linnéa Malmqvist (Australia) Alexandra Walters (Israel) Shelly Krolitzky
September 26	Tiberias, Israel; Hard $10,000; Singles and doubles draws	(Israel) Vlada Ekshibarova (Turkey) Melis Sezer; 6–1, 6–3	(Russia) Ekaterina Kazionova (United States) Madeleine Kobelt	(Russia) Ekaterina Kazionova (Belgium) Hélène Scholsen	(United States) Madeleine Kobelt (Sweden) Linnéa Malmqvist (Australia) Alexandra Walters (Israel) Shelly Krolitzky
September 26	Pula, Italy; Clay $10,000; Singles and doubles draws	(Italy) Claudia Giovine; 6–4, 6–3	(Italy) Alice Balducci	(Italy) Deborah Chiesa (Czech Republic) Petra Krejsová	(Austria) Marlies Szupper (Switzerland) Ylena In-Albon (Austria) Nicole Rottmann (Argentina) Paula Ormaechea
September 26	Pula, Italy; Clay $10,000; Singles and doubles draws	(Czech Republic) Petra Krejsová (Italy) Dalila Spiteri; 6–0, 1–6, [10–3]	(India) Snehadevi Reddy (Bosnia and Herzegovina) Jelena Simić	(Italy) Deborah Chiesa (Czech Republic) Petra Krejsová	(Austria) Marlies Szupper (Switzerland) Ylena In-Albon (Austria) Nicole Rottmann (Argentina) Paula Ormaechea
September 26	Shymkent, Kazakhstan; Clay $10,000; Singles and doubles draws	(Russia) Ulyana Ayzatulina; 7–5, 6–0	(Kazakhstan) Gozal Ainitdinova	(Russia) Margarita Lazareva (Russia) Aleksandra Vostrikova	(Kazakhstan) Kamila Kerimbayeva (Kazakhstan) Alexandra Grinchishina (Germany) Julyette Steur (Russia) Anna Pribylova
September 26	Shymkent, Kazakhstan; Clay $10,000; Singles and doubles draws	(Russia) Ulyana Ayzatulina (Russia) Margarita Lazareva; 6–2, 6–3	(Kazakhstan) Zhibek Kulambayeva (Russia) Anna Ukolova	(Russia) Margarita Lazareva (Russia) Aleksandra Vostrikova	(Kazakhstan) Kamila Kerimbayeva (Kazakhstan) Alexandra Grinchishina (Germany) Julyette Steur (Russia) Anna Pribylova
September 26	Chișinău, Moldova; Clay $10,000; Singles and doubles draws	(Romania) Ilona Georgiana Ghioroaie; 6–4, 6–2	(Ukraine) Veronika Kapshay	(Romania) Georgia Crăciun (Russia) Olga Puchkova	(Ukraine) Oleksandra Andrieieva (Moldova) Adriana Sosnovschi (Romania) Teodora Stîngă (Ukraine) Nadiya Kolb
September 26	Chișinău, Moldova; Clay $10,000; Singles and doubles draws	(Ukraine) Maryna Kolb (Ukraine) Nadiya Kolb; 5–7, 7–5, [10–6]	(Ukraine) Veronika Kapshay (Ukraine) Angelina Shakhraychuk	(Romania) Georgia Crăciun (Russia) Olga Puchkova	(Ukraine) Oleksandra Andrieieva (Moldova) Adriana Sosnovschi (Romania) Teodora Stîngă (Ukraine) Nadiya Kolb
September 26	Melilla, Spain; Clay $10,000; Singles and doubles draws	(France) Harmony Tan; 7–6^{(7–4)}, 6–4	(Spain) María José Luque Moreno	(Argentina) Martina Capurro Taborda (Croatia) Mariana Dražić	(Italy) Marianna Natali (Germany) Lisa Ponomar (Spain) Irene Burillo Escorihuela (Spain) Lucía Marzal Martínez
September 26	Melilla, Spain; Clay $10,000; Singles and doubles draws	(Croatia) Mariana Dražić (Hungary) Panna Udvardy; 6–1, 2–0, ret.	(Italy) Marianna Natali (Germany) Lisa Ponomar	(Argentina) Martina Capurro Taborda (Croatia) Mariana Dražić	(Italy) Marianna Natali (Germany) Lisa Ponomar (Spain) Irene Burillo Escorihuela (Spain) Lucía Marzal Martínez
September 26	Hammamet, Tunisia; Clay $10,000; Singles and doubles draws	(Germany) Katharina Hobgarski; 6–0, 7–5	(Chile) Fernanda Brito	(Sweden) Ida Jarlskog (Switzerland) Karin Kennel	(Venezuela) Andrea Gámiz (Slovakia) Barbara Kötelesová (France) Alice Bacquié (Tunisia) Chiraz Bechri
September 26	Hammamet, Tunisia; Clay $10,000; Singles and doubles draws	(Brazil) Carolina Alves (Switzerland) Karin Kennel; 6–2, 4–6, [11–9]	(Chile) Fernanda Brito (Bolivia) Noelia Zeballos	(Sweden) Ida Jarlskog (Switzerland) Karin Kennel	(Venezuela) Andrea Gámiz (Slovakia) Barbara Kötelesová (France) Alice Bacquié (Tunisia) Chiraz Bechri
September 26	Roehampton, United Kingdom; Hard $10,000; Singles and doubles draws	(France) Victoria Larrière; 6–2, 6–3	(United States) Dasha Ivanova	(Bulgaria) Julia Terziyska (France) Margot Yerolymos	(Germany) Luisa Marie Huber (Germany) Katharina Hering (Georgia (country)) Mariam Bolkvadze (United Kingdom) Alicia Barnett
September 26	Roehampton, United Kingdom; Hard $10,000; Singles and doubles draws	(United Kingdom) Emma Hurst (United Kingdom) Laura Sainsbury; 4–6, 6–3, [10–4]	(United States) Libby Muma (United States) Eva Siska	(Bulgaria) Julia Terziyska (France) Margot Yerolymos	(Germany) Luisa Marie Huber (Germany) Katharina Hering (Georgia (country)) Mariam Bolkvadze (United Kingdom) Alicia Barnett
September 26	Charleston, United States; Clay $10,000; Singles and doubles draws	(United States) Nicole Coopersmith; 6–3, 6–4	(Brazil) Ingrid Gamarra Martins	(Japan) Yukako Noi (United States) Lauren Embree	(Hungary) Naomi Totka (Colombia) Emiliana Arango (New Zealand) Jade Lewis (United States) Jaeda Daniel
September 26	Charleston, United States; Clay $10,000; Singles and doubles draws	(United States) Andie Daniell (Canada) Erin Routliffe; 6–4, 6–2	(United States) Quinn Gleason (United States) Whitney Kay	(Japan) Yukako Noi (United States) Lauren Embree	(Hungary) Naomi Totka (Colombia) Emiliana Arango (New Zealand) Jade Lewis (United States) Jaeda Daniel
