= Belinda Bencic career statistics =

Career finals
Discipline	Type	Won	Lost	Total
Singles	Grand Slam	–	–	–
Singles	WTA Finals (Note: Formerly known as WTA Tour Championships until 2014.)	–	–	–
Singles	WTA 1000 (Note: The WTA Premier Mandatory & 5 were reclassified as WTA 1000 tournaments in 2021.)	2	0	2
Singles	WTA 500 (Note: The WTA Premier tournaments were reclassified as WTA 500 tournaments in 2021.)	7	6	13
Singles	WTA 250 (Note: The WTA International tournaments were reclassified as WTA 250 tournaments in 2021.)	0	4	4
Singles	Olympics	1	0	1
Singles	Total	10	10	20
Doubles	Grand Slam	–	–	–
Doubles	WTA Finals	–	–	–
Doubles	WTA 1000	–	–	–
Doubles	WTA 500	–	–	–
Doubles	WTA 250	2	0	2
Doubles	Olympics	0	1	1
Doubles	Total	2	1	3

This is a list of the main career statistics of professional Swiss tennis player Belinda Bencic. In addition to her gold medal at the Tokyo Olympics, she has won nine singles and two doubles titles on the WTA Tour. She made her breakthrough at the age of 18 when she won her first WTA title, the Premier Eastbourne International, and later that year her first WTA 1000 title at the Canadian Open. In 2019, she won her second WTA 1000 title at the Dubai Championships. She was also the US Open semifinalist in 2019.

Her contributions to the Swiss team can be seen at both the Billie Jean King Cup and the Summer Olympics. At the Billie Jean King Cup she was part of the team to reach the final in 2021 and in addition to get to two semifinals before that. Belinda made her Summer Olympics debut in 2021 and won two medals. In the singles event, she defeated Markéta Vondroušová in the final to win the gold medal, while in doubles alongside Viktorija Golubic won the silver medal after losing to Czechs Barbora Krejčíková and Kateřina Siniaková.

In singles, Bencic broke into the top 10 in 2016 when she was 18 years old reaching a ranking of 7. Then in 2020, she reached her new career-high rank of No. 4. Due to more focus in singles, she has never entered the top 50 in doubles but has been close, getting to the rank of No. 59 in 2016.

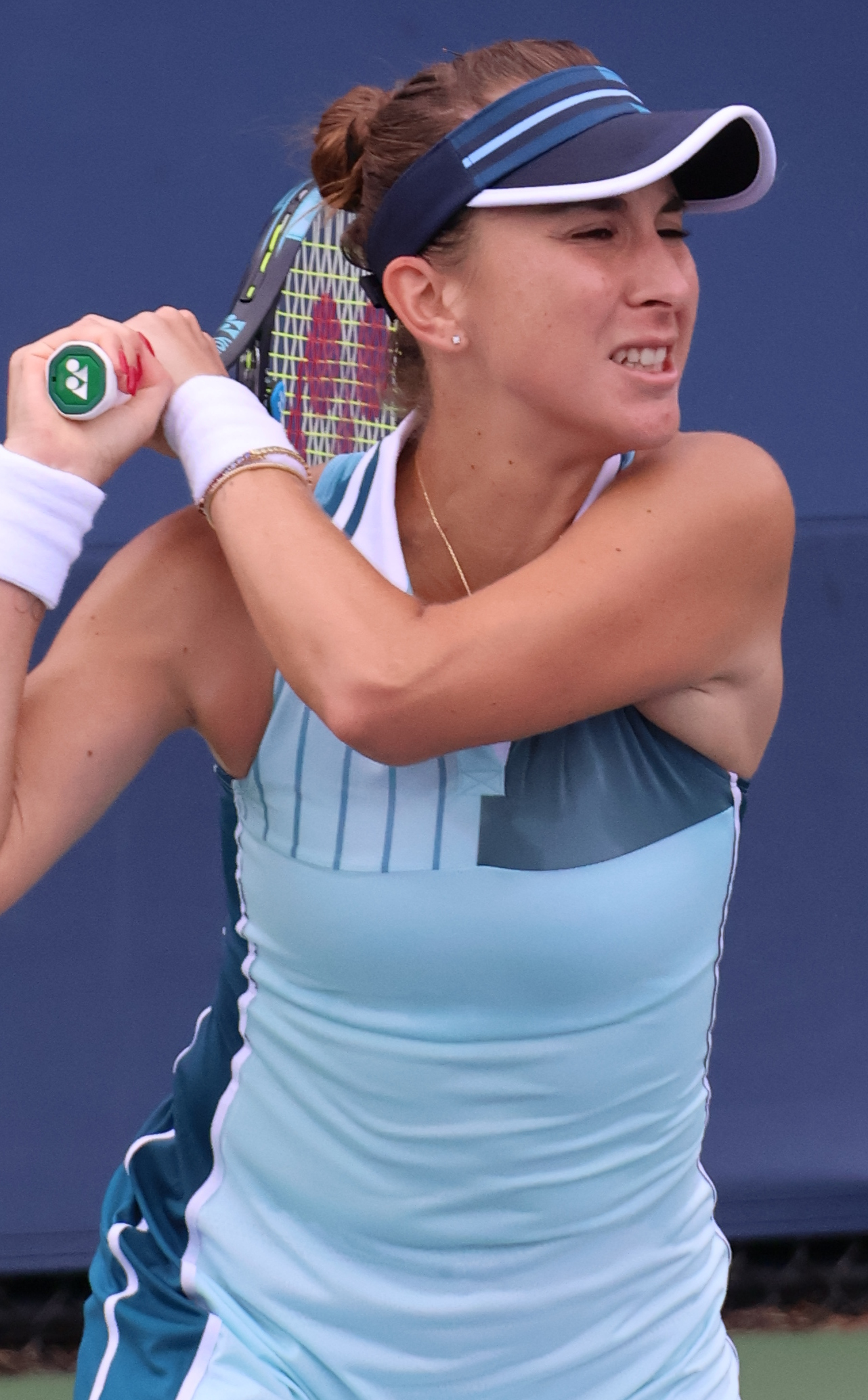
Bencic at the 2023 US Open.

== Performance timelines ==
Key
W	F	SF	QF	#R	RR	Q#	P#	DNQ	A	Z#	PO	G	S	B	NMS	NTI	P	NH

(W) winner; (F) finalist; (SF) semifinalist; (QF) quarterfinalist; (#R) rounds 4, 3, 2, 1; (RR) round-robin stage; (Q#) qualification round; (P#) preliminary round; (DNQ) did not qualify; (A) absent; (Z#) Davis/Fed Cup Zonal Group (with number indication) or (PO) play-off; (G) gold, (S) silver or (B) bronze Olympic/Paralympic medal; (NMS) not a Masters tournament; (NTI) not a Tier I tournament; (P) postponed; (NH) not held; (SR) strike rate (events won / competed); (W–L) win–loss record.
To avoid confusion and double counting, these charts are updated at the conclusion of a tournament or when the player's participation has ended.

Only main-draw results in WTA Tour, Grand Slam tournaments, Billie Jean King Cup, United Cup, Hopman Cup and Olympic Games are included in win–loss records.

=== Singles ===
Current through the 2026 Wimbledon Championships.

Tournament	2012	2013	2014	2015	2016	2017	2018	2019	2020	2021	2022	2023	2024	2025	2026	SR	W–L	Win %
Grand Slam tournaments
Australian Open	A	A	2R	1R	4R	1R	2R	3R	3R	3R	2R	4R	A	4R	2R	0 / 12	19–12	61%
French Open	A	A	1R	2R	A	A	2R	3R	A	2R	3R	1R	A	A	4R	0 / 8	10–8	56%
Wimbledon	A	A	3R	4R	2R	A	4R	3R	NH	1R	1R	4R	A	SF	4R	0 / 10	22–10	69%
US Open	A	A	QF	3R	3R	A	1R	SF	A	QF	3R	4R	A	2R	1R	0 / 10	22–10	69%
Win–Loss	0–0	0–0	7–4	6–4	6–3	0–1	5–4	10–4	2–1	7–4	5–4	9–4	0–0	9–3	7–4	0 / 40	73–40	65%
Year-end championships
WTA Finals	Did Not Qualify							SF	NH	Did Not Qualify						0 / 1	2–2	50%
WTA Elite Trophy (Note: WTA Tournament of Champions was held from 2009 to 2014, when WTA Elite Trophy replaced it.)	Did Not Qualify			A	Did Not Qualify			A	Not Held			A	Not Held			0 / 0	0–0	–
National representation
Summer Olympics	A	Not Held			A	Not Held				G	Not Held		A	Not Held		1 / 1	6–0	100%
Billie Jean King Cup (Note: Formerly known as Fed Cup until 2020.)	WG2	A	WG2	PO	SF	SF	1R	PO	F (Note: Edition is split into the two years due to COVID-19.)		W	A	A	A		1 / 5	17–6	74%
WTA 1000 tournaments
Qatar Open	A	A	A	NTI	2R	NTI	A	NTI	QF	NTI	1R	NTI	A	A	A	0 / 3	2–3	40%
Dubai Championships	Not Tier I			2R	NTI	A	NTI	W	NTI	3R	NTI	3R	A	2R	3R	1 / 6	11–5	69%
Indian Wells Open	A	A	1R	4R	3R	2R	2R	SF	NH	A	2R	2R	A	QF	4R	0 / 10	15–10	60%
Miami Open	A	Q1	A	4R	2R	1R	A	2R	NH	3R	SF	3R	A	2R	QF	0 / 9	13–9	59%
Madrid Open	A	A	1R	1R	A	A	A	SF	NH	QF	3R	A	A	4R	4R	0 / 7	14–7	67%
Italian Open	A	A	2R	1R	A	A	A	2R	2R	1R	2R	A	A	1R	3R	0 / 8	4–8	33%
Canadian Open	A	A	A	W	A	A	A	3R	NH	A	QF	QF	A	3R	QF	1 / 6	18–5	79%
Cincinnati Open	A	A	1R	3R	2R	A	Q1	1R	A	QF	1R	1R	A	2R		0 / 8	5–8	38%
China Open	A	A	1R	2R (Note: Withdrew during the tournament. Not counted as a loss.)	2R	A	1R	3R	Not Held			A	A	4R		0 / 6	6–5	55%
Wuhan Open (Note: In 2014, the Pan Pacific Open was downgraded to a Premier event and replaced by the Wuhan Open. The Premier 5 tournaments were reclassified as WTA 1000 tournaments in 2021.)	A	2R	A	2R	1R	A	1R	2R	Not Held				A	3R		0 / 6	3–6	33%
Guadalajara Open	Not Held										2R	A	Not Tier I			0 / 1	1–1	50%
Win–Loss	0–0	1–1	1–5	16–7	2–6	1–2	1–3	19–8	2–2	8–5	11–8	5–5	0–0	13–9	9-6	2 / 67	89–67	57%
Career statistics
	2012	2013	2014	2015	2016	2017	2018	2019	2020	2021	2022	2023	2024	2025	2026	Career		
Tournaments	1	3	17	23	21	8	14	22	7	20	20	15	3	18	14	Career total: 206		
Titles	0	0	0	2	0	0	0	2	0	1	1	2	0	2	0	Career total: 10		
Finals	0	0	1	4	1	0	1	3	0	3	2	3	1	2	0	Career total: 21		
Hard Win–Loss	0–1	2–2	11–9	24–11	16–16	6–10	11–14	32–15	8–7	27–12	23–11	24–10	7–3	29–10	15–6	8 / 141	235–137	63%
Clay Win–Loss	0–0	0–1	6–6	3–6	0–1	0–0	1–1	11–6	0–1	5–5	13–4	4–2	0–0	3–3	8–4	1 / 39	54–40	57%
Grass Win–Loss	0–0	0–0	3–3	14–3	4–4	0–0	4–2	7–3	0–0	5–3	6–3	3–1	0–0	5–2	3–1	1 / 26	54–25	68%
Overall Win–Loss	0–1	2–3	20–18	41–20	20–21	6–10	16–17	50–24	8–8	37–20	42–18	31–13	7–3	37–15	26–11	10 / 206	343–202	63%
Win %	0%	40%	53%	67%	49%	38%	48%	68%	50%	65%	70%	70%	70%	71%	70%	Career total: 63%		
Year-end ranking (Note: 2011: WTA ranking–1059.)	626	212	33	14	43	165	37	8	12	23	12	17	481	13		$13,247,128		

=== Doubles ===
Tournament	2012	2013	2014	2015	2016	2017	2018	2019	2020	2021	2022	2023	SR	W–L	Win%
Grand Slam tournaments
Australian Open	A	A	A	1R	2R (Note: Withdrew during the tournament. Not counted as a loss.)	1R	A	1R	A	1R	A	2R	0 / 6	2–5	29%
French Open	A	A	A	3R	A	A	1R	2R	A	A	1R	A	0 / 4	3–4	43%
Wimbledon	A	A	2R	2R	A	A	1R	1R	NH	1R	2R	A	0 / 6	3–6	33%
US Open	A	A	1R	1R	1R	A	1R	A	A	A	A	A	0 / 4	0–4	0%
Win–Loss	0–0	0–0	1–2	3–4	1–1	0–1	0–3	1–3	0–0	0–2	1–2	1–1	0 / 20	8–19	30%
National representation
Summer Olympics	A	Not Held			A	Not Held				F–S	NH		0 / 1	4–1	80%
WTA 1000 tournaments
Qatar Open	A	Not Tier I			A	NTI	A	NTI	QF	NTI	A		0 / 1	2–1	40%
Dubai Championships	NTI	A	A	A	NTI	A	NTI	1R	NTI	1R	NTI		0 / 2	0–2	40%
Indian Wells Open	A	A	A	A	A	A	A	A	NH	A	A		0 / 0	0–0	–
Miami Open	A	A	A	A	1R	A	A	QF	NH	A	2R		0 / 3	3–3	50%
Madrid Open	A	A	A	A	A	A	A	A	NH	SF	QF		0 / 2	5–2	71%
Italian Open	A	A	A	A	A	A	A	A	A	A	A		0 / 0	0–0	–
Canadian Open	A	A	A	2R	A	A	A	A	NH	A	A		0 / 1	1–1	50%
Cincinnati Open	A	A	A	1R	1R	A	A	A	A	A	A		0 / 2	0–2	0%
Wuhan Open	A	A	A	A	A	A	1R	A	Not Held				0 / 1	0–1	0%
China Open	A	A	A	1R	A	A	A	A	Not Held				0 / 1	0–1	0%
Career statistics
Tournaments	1	0	3	12	8	4	7	9	1	7	7	1	Career total: 60		
Titles	0	0	0	2	0	0	0	0	0	0	0	0	Career total: 2		
Finals	0	0	0	2	0	0	0	0	0	1	0	0	Career total: 3		
Overall Win–Loss	0–2	0–0	2–4	12–10	4–7	1–4	3–7	8–9	2–1	8–7	8–7	2–1	2 / 60	50–59	46%
Year-end ranking	1067	466	208	68	215	269	242	116	104	154	133				

== Significant finals ==
=== Summer Olympics ===
==== Singles: 1 (gold medal) ====
Result	Year	Tournament	Surface	Opponent	Score
Gold	2021	Tokyo Summer Olympics	Hard	(Czech Republic) Markéta Vondroušová	7–5, 2–6, 6–3

==== Doubles: 1 (silver medal) ====
Result	Year	Tournament	Surface	Partner	Opponents	Score
Silver	2021	Tokyo Summer Olympics	Hard	(Switzerland) Viktorija Golubic	(Czech Republic) Barbora Krejčíková (Czech Republic) Kateřina Siniaková	5–7, 1–6

=== WTA 1000 tournaments ===
==== Singles: 2 (2 titles) ====
Result	Year	Tournament	Surface	Opponent	Score
Win	2015	Canadian Open	Hard	(Romania) Simona Halep	7–6^{(7–5)}, 6–7^{(4–7)}, 3–0 ret.
Win	2019	Dubai Championships	Hard	(Czech Republic) Petra Kvitová	6–3, 1–6, 6–2

==== Mixed doubles: 1 (title) ====
Result	Year	Tournament	Surface	Partner	Opponents	Score
Win	2026	Indian Wells Open	Hard	(Italy) Flavio Cobolli	(Canada) Gabriela Dabrowski (United Kingdom) Lloyd Glasspool	6–3, 2–6, [10–7]

== WTA Tour finals ==
=== Singles: 20 (10 titles, 10 runner-ups) ===
Legend Olympics (1–0) Premier 5 / WTA 1000 (2–0) Premier / WTA 500 (7–6) International / WTA 250 (0–4)	Finals by surface Hard (8–5) Clay (1–1) Grass (1–4)	Finals by setting Outdoor (9–8) Indoor (1–2)

Result	W–L	Date	Tournament	Tier	Surface	Opponent	Score
Loss	0–1	Oct 2014	Tianjin Open, China	International	Hard	(United States) Alison Riske	3–6, 4–6
Loss	0–2	Jun 2015	Rosmalen Open, Netherlands	International	Grass	(Italy) Camila Giorgi	5–7, 3–6
Win	1–2	Jun 2015	Eastbourne International, UK	Premier	Grass	(Poland) Agnieszka Radwańska	6–4, 4–6, 6–0
Win	2–2	Aug 2015	Canadian Open, Canada	Premier 5	Hard	(Romania) Simona Halep	7–6^{(7–5)}, 6–7^{(4–7)}, 3–0 ret.
Loss	2–3	Sep 2015	Pan Pacific Open, Japan	Premier	Hard	(Poland) Agnieszka Radwańska	2–6, 2–6
Loss	2–4	Feb 2016	St. Petersburg Trophy, Russia	Premier	Hard (i)	(Italy) Roberta Vinci	4–6, 3–6
Loss	2–5	Oct 2018	Luxembourg Open, Luxembourg	International	Hard (i)	(Germany) Julia Görges	4–6, 5–7
Win	3–5	Feb 2019	Dubai Championships, UAE	Premier 5	Hard	(Czech Republic) Petra Kvitová	6–3, 1–6, 6–2
Loss	3–6	Jun 2019	Mallorca Open, Spain	International	Grass	(United States) Sofia Kenin	7–6^{(7–2)}, 6–7^{(5–7)}, 4–6
Win	4–6	Oct 2019	Kremlin Cup, Russia	Premier	Hard (i)	(Russia) Anastasia Pavlyuchenkova	3–6, 6–1, 6–1
Loss	4–7	Feb 2021	Adelaide International, Australia	WTA 500	Hard	(Poland) Iga Świątek	2–6, 2–6
Loss	4–8	Jun 2021	Berlin Open, Germany	WTA 500	Grass	(Russia) Liudmila Samsonova	6–1, 1–6, 3–6
Win	5–8	Jul 2021	Tokyo Olympics, Japan	Olympics	Hard	(Czech Republic) Markéta Vondroušová	7–5, 2–6, 6–3
Win	6–8	Apr 2022	Charleston Open, United States	WTA 500	Clay (green)	(Tunisia) Ons Jabeur	6–1, 5–7, 6–4
Loss	6–9	Jun 2022	Berlin Open, Germany	WTA 500	Grass	(Tunisia) Ons Jabeur	3–6, 1–2 ret.
Win	7–9	Jan 2023	Adelaide International, Australia	WTA 500	Hard	Daria Kasatkina	6–0, 6–2
Win	8–9	Feb 2023	Abu Dhabi Open, UAE	WTA 500	Hard	Liudmila Samsonova	1–6, 7–6^{(10–8)}, 6–4
Loss	8–10	Apr 2023	Charleston Open, United States	WTA 500	Clay (green)	(Tunisia) Ons Jabeur	6–7^{(6–8)}, 4–6
Win	9–10	Feb 2025	Abu Dhabi Open, UAE (2)	WTA 500	Hard	(United States) Ashlyn Krueger	4–6, 6–1, 6–1
Win	10–10	Oct 2025	Pan Pacific Open, Japan	WTA 500	Hard	(Czech Republic) Linda Nosková	6–2, 6–3

=== Doubles: 3 (2 titles, 1 runner-up) ===
Legend Olympics (0–1) International (2–0)	Finals by surface Hard (1–1) Clay (1–0)	Finals by setting Outdoor (2–1)

Result	W–L	Date	Tournament	Tier	Surface	Partner	Opponents	Score
Win	1–0	May 2015	Prague Open, Czech Republic	International	Clay	(Czech Republic) Kateřina Siniaková	(Ukraine) Kateryna Bondarenko (Czech Republic) Eva Hrdinová	6–2, 6–2
Win	2–0	Aug 2015	Washington Open, United States	International	Hard	(France) Kristina Mladenovic	(Spain) Lara Arruabarrena (Slovenia) Andreja Klepač	7–5, 7–6^{(9–7)}
Loss	2–1	July 2021	Tokyo Olympics, Japan	Olympics	Hard	(Switzerland) Viktorija Golubic	(Czech Republic) Barbora Krejcikova (Czech Republic) Kateřina Siniaková	5–7, 1–6

== WTA 125 finals ==
=== Singles: 3 (2 titles, 1 runner-up) ===
Result	W–L	Date	Tournament	Surface	Opponent	Score
Win	1–0	Nov 2017	Hua Hin Challenger, Thailand	Hard	(Chinese Taipei) Hsieh Su-wei	6–3, 6–4
Win	2–0	Nov 2017	Taipei Challenger, Chinese Taipei	Carpet (i)	(Netherlands) Arantxa Rus	7–6^{(7–3)}, 6–1
Loss	2–1	Dec 2024	Open Angers, France	Hard (i)	(United States) Alycia Parks	6–7^{(4–7)}, 6–3, 0–6

=== Doubles: 1 (runner-up) ===
Result	W–L	Date	Tournament	Surface	Partner	Opponents	Score
Loss	0–1	Dec 2024	Open Angers Arena Loire, France	Hard	(Switzerland) Céline Naef	(Romania) Monica Niculescu (Romania) Elena-Gabriela Ruse	3–6, 4–6

== ITF Circuit finals ==
=== Singles: 6 (5 titles, 1 runner-up) ===
Legend $100,000 tournaments (2–0) $80,000 tournaments (1–0) $25,000 tournaments (0–1) $10,000 tournaments (2–0)	Finals by surface Hard (5–0) Grass (0–1)

Result	W–L	Date	Tournament	Tier	Surface	Opponent	Score
Win	1–0	Sep 2012	ITF Sharm El Sheikh, Egypt	10,000	Hard	(Oman) Fatma Al-Nabhani	6–3, 7–6^{(7–4)}
Win	2–0	Sep 2012	ITF Sharm El Sheikh, Egypt	10,000	Hard	(Austria) Barbara Haas	6–4, 6–0
Loss	2–1	Oct 2013	ITF Makinohara, Japan	25,000	Grass	(Kazakhstan) Zarina Diyas	3–6, 4–6
Win	3–1	Sep 2017	Neva Cup St. Petersburg, Russia	100,000	Hard (i)	(Ukraine) Dayana Yastremska	6–2, 6–3
Win	4–1	Dec 2017	Dubai Tennis Challenge, UAE	100,000+H	Hard	(Croatia) Ajla Tomljanović	6–4, ret.
Win	5–1	Nov 2018	Las Vegas Open, United States	80,000	Hard	(United States) Nicole Gibbs	7–5, 6–1

=== Doubles: 5 (3 titles, 2 runner-ups) ===
Legend $100,000 tournaments (1–1) $25,000 tournaments (1–1) $10,000 tournaments (1–0)	Finals by surface Hard (2–1) Clay (1–0) Grass (0–1)

Result	W–L	Date	Tournament	Tier	Surface	Partner	Opponents	Score
Win	1–0	Sep 2012	ITF Sharm El Sheikh, Egypt	10,000	Hard	(France) Lou Brouleau	(Poland) Olga Brózda (Ukraine) Ganna Piven	7–6^{(7–3)}, 3–6, [10–6]
Win	2–0	Jun 2013	ITF Lenzerheide, Switzerland	25,000	Clay	(Czech Republic) Kateřina Siniaková	(Russia) Veronika Kudermetova (Latvia) Diāna Marcinkēviča	6–0, 6–2
Loss	2–1	Oct 2013	ITF Hamamatsu, Japan	25,000	Grass	(Georgia (country)) Sofia Shapatava	(Japan) Shuko Aoyama (Japan) Junri Namigata	4–6, 3–6
Loss	2–2	Sep 2017	Neva Cup St. Petersburg, Russia	100,000	Hard	(Slovakia) Michaela Hončová	(Russia) Anna Blinkova (Russia) Veronika Kudermetova	3–6, 1–6
Win	3–2	Oct 2017	Internationaux de Poitiers, France	100,000	Hard	(Belgium) Yanina Wickmayer	(Romania) Mihaela Buzărnescu (Germany) Nicola Geuer	7–6^{(9–7)}, 6–3

== Junior Grand Slam tournament finals ==
=== Singles: 2 (2 titles) ===
Result	Year	Tournament	Surface	Opponent	Score
Win	2013	French Open	Clay	(Germany) Antonia Lottner	6–1, 6–3
Win	2013	Wimbledon	Grass	(United States) Taylor Townsend	4–6, 6–1, 6–4

=== Doubles: 3 (3 runner-ups) ===
Result	Year	Tournament	Surface	Partner	Opponents	Score
Loss	2012	Wimbledon	Grass	(Croatia) Ana Konjuh	(Canada) Eugenie Bouchard (United States) Taylor Townsend	4–6, 3–6
Loss	2012	US Open	Hard	(Slovakia) Petra Uberalová	(United States) Gabrielle Andrews (United States) Taylor Townsend	4–6, 3–6
Loss	2013	US Open	Hard	(Spain) Sara Sorribes Tormo	(Czech Republic) Barbora Krejčíková (Czech Republic) Kateřina Siniaková	3–6, 4–6

== WTA Tour career earnings ==
Current through the 2022 Tallinn Open.

Year	Grand Slam singles titles	WTA singles titles	Total singles titles	Earnings ($)	Money list rank
2014	0	0	0	721,411	37
2015	0	2	2	1,480,572	20
2016	0	0	0	692,229	45
2017	0	0	0	130,978	176
2018	0	0	0	595,879	65
2019	0	2	2	4,113,075	9
2020	0	0	0	321,604	74
2021	0	1	1	1,132,234	28
2022	0	1	1	1,283,016	25
Career	0	6	6	10,583,062	56

== Career Grand Slam statistics ==
=== Seedings ===
Tournaments won by Bencic are in boldface, and advanced into finals by Bencic are in italics.

Year	Australian Open	French Open	Wimbledon	US Open
2014	qualifier	not seeded	not seeded	not seeded
2015	32nd	not seeded	30th	12th
2016	12th	did not play	7th	24th
2017	not seeded	did not play	did not play	did not play
2018	not seeded	not seeded	not seeded	not seeded
2019	not seeded	15th	13th	13th
2020	6th	did not play	cancelled	did not play
2021	11th	10th	9th	11th
2022	22nd	14th	14th	13th
2023	12th	12th	14th	15th
2024	did not play	did not play	did not play	did not play
2025	protected ranking	did not play	not seeded	16th
2026	10th	11th		

=== Best Grand Slam results details ===
Grand Slam winners are in boldface, and runner–ups are in italics.

==== Singles ====
**Australian Open**
**2016 (12th)**
Round	Opponent	Rank	Score
1R	(United States) Alison Riske	88	6–4, 6–3
2R	(Hungary) Tímea Babos	60	6–3, 6–3
3R	(Ukraine) Kateryna Bondarenko	92	4–6, 6–2, 6–4
4R	(Russia) Maria Sharapova (5)	5	5–7, 5–7
**2023 (12th)**
Round	Opponent	Rank	Score
1R	(Bulgaria) Viktoriya Tomova	91	6–1, 6–2
2R	(United States) Claire Liu	62	7–6^{(7–3)}, 6–3
3R	(Italy) Camila Giorgi	70	6–2, 7–5
4R	**Aryna Sabalenka (5)**	5	5–7, 2–6

**Wimbledon Championships**
**2025 (not seeded)**
Round	Opponent	Rank	Score
1R	(United States) Alycia Parks	60	6–0, 6–3
2R	(France) Elsa Jacquemot (Q)	113	4–6, 6–1, 6–2
3R	(Italy) Elisabetta Cocciaretto	116	6–4, 3–6, 7–6^{(10–7)}
4R	Ekaterina Alexandrova (18)	17	7–6^{(7–4)}, 6–4
QF	Mirra Andreeva (7)	7	7–6^{(7–3)}, 7–6^{(7–2)}
SF	**(Poland) Iga Świątek (8)**	4	2–6, 0–6

**French Open**
**2026 (11th)**
Round	Opponent	Rank	Score
1R	(Austria) Sinja Kraus (Q)	98	6–2, 6–3
2R	(United States) Caty McNally	63	6–4, 6–0
3R	(United States) Peyton Stearns	78	6–3, 6–3
4R	(Ukraine) Elina Svitolina (7)	7	6–4, 4–6, 0–6

**US Open**
**2019 (13th)**
Round	Opponent	Rank	Score
1R	(Luxembourg) Mandy Minella	142	6–3, 6–2
2R	(France) Alizé Cornet	64	6–4, 1–6, 6–2
3R	(Estonia) Anett Kontaveit (21)	21	w/o
4R	(Japan) Naomi Osaka (1)	**1**	7–5, 6–4
QF	(Croatia) Donna Vekić (23)	23	7–6^{(7–5)}, 6–3
SF	**(Canada) Bianca Andreescu (15)**	15	6–7^{(3–7)}, 5–7

== Wins against top 10 players ==
- Bencic has a 41–40 record against players who were, at the time the match was played, ranked in the top 10.

No.	Opponents	Rk	Event	Surface	Rd	Score	Rk	Years	Ref
1.	(Germany) Angelique Kerber	7	US Open, United States	Hard	3R	6–1, 7–5	58	2014	
2.	(Serbia) Jelena Janković	10	US Open, United States	Hard	4R	7–6^{(8–6)}, 6–3	58	2014	
3.	(Denmark) Caroline Wozniacki	5	Indian Wells Open, US	Hard	3R	6–4, 6–4	37	2015	
4.	(Denmark) Caroline Wozniacki	5	Eastbourne International, UK	Grass	SF	3–0 ret.	31	2015	
5.	(Denmark) Caroline Wozniacki	5	Canadian Open, Canada	Hard	2R	7–5, 7–5	20	2015	
6.	(Serbia) Ana Ivanovic	6	Canadian Open, Canada	Hard	QF	6–4, 6–2	20	2015	
7.	(United States) Serena Williams	1	Canadian Open, Canada	Hard	SF	3–6, 7–5, 6–4	20	2015	
8.	(Romania) Simona Halep	3	Canadian Open, Canada	Hard	F	7–6^{(7–5)}, 6–7^{(4–7)}, 3–0 ret.	20	2015	
9.	(Spain) Garbiñe Muguruza	8	Pan Pacific Open, Japan	Hard	QF	7–6^{(7–1)}, 6–1	15	2015	
10.	(Denmark) Caroline Wozniacki	6	Pan Pacific Open, Japan	Hard	SF	6–2, 6–4	15	2015	
11.	(Germany) Angelique Kerber	2	Fed Cup, Leipzig, Germany	Hard (i)	QF	7–6^{(7–4)}, 6–3	11	2016	
12.	(United States) Venus Williams	5	Australian Open, Australia	Hard	1R	6–3, 7–5	78	2018	
13.	(France) Caroline Garcia	6	Wimbledon, UK	Grass	1R	7–6^{(7–2)}, 6–3	56	2018	
14.	(Belarus) Aryna Sabalenka	9	Dubai Championships, UAE	Hard	3R	6–4, 2–6, 7–6^{(9–7)}	45	2019	
15.	(Romania) Simona Halep	2	Dubai Championships, UAE	Hard	QF	4–6, 6–4, 6–2	45	2019	
16.	(Ukraine) Elina Svitolina	6	Dubai Championships, UAE	Hard	SF	6–2, 3–6, 7–6^{(7–3)}	45	2019	
17.	(Czech Republic) Petra Kvitová	4	Dubai Championships, UAE	Hard	F	6–3, 1–6, 6–2	45	2019	
18.	(Japan) Naomi Osaka	1	Indian Wells Open, US	Hard	4R	6–3, 6–1	23	2019	
19.	(Czech Republic) Karolína Plíšková	5	Indian Wells Open, US	Hard	QF	6–3, 4–6, 6–3	23	2019	
20.	(Japan) Naomi Osaka	1	Madrid Open, Spain	Clay	QF	3–6, 6–2, 7–5	18	2019	
21.	(Germany) Angelique Kerber	6	Mallorca Open, Spain	Grass	SF	2–6, 7–6^{(7–2)}, 6–4	13	2019	
22.	(Japan) Naomi Osaka	1	US Open, United States	Hard	4R	7–5, 6–4	12	2019	
23.	(Czech Republic) Petra Kvitová	6	WTA Finals, Shenzhen	Hard (i)	RR	6–3, 1–6, 6–4	7	2019	
24.	(Netherlands) Kiki Bertens	10	WTA Finals, Shenzhen	Hard (i)	RR	7–5, 1–0 ret.	7	2019	
25.	(Poland) Iga Świątek	8	US Open, United States	Hard	4R	7–6^{(14–12)}, 6–3	12	2021	
26.	(Germany) Angelique Kerber	9	BJK Cup, Czech Republic	Hard (i)	RR	5–7, 6–2, 6–2	17	2021	
27.	(Czech Republic) Barbora Krejčíková	3	BJK Cup, Czech Republic	Hard (i)	RR	7–6^{(7–2)}, 6–4	17	2021	
28.	(Spain) Paula Badosa	3	Charleston Open, US	Clay	QF	2–6, 7–6^{(7–2)}, 6–4	21	2022	
29.	(Tunisia) Ons Jabeur	10	Charleston Open, US	Clay	F	6–1, 5–7, 6–4	21	2022	
30.	(Greece) Maria Sakkari	6	German Open, Germany	Grass	SF	6–7^{(6–8)}, 6–4, 6–4	17	2022	
31.	(Spain) Garbiñe Muguruza	8	Canadian Open, Canada	Hard	3R	6–1, 6–3	12	2022	
32.	(France) Caroline Garcia	4	Adelaide International 2, Australia	Hard	QF	6–2, 3–6, 6–4	13	2023	
33.	Daria Kasatkina	8	Adelaide International 2, Australia	Hard	F	6–0, 6–2	13	2023	
34.	(United States) Jessica Pegula	3	Charleston Open, US	Clay	SF	7–5, 7–6^{(7–5)}	11	2023	
35.	(Czech Republic) Petra Kvitová	9	Canadian Open, Canada	Hard	3R	6–7^{(3–7)}, 6–3, 6–1	13	2023	
36.	(Kazakhstan) Elena Rybakina	5	Abu Dhabi Open, UAE	Hard	SF	3–6, 6–3, 6–4	157	2025	
37.	(United States) Coco Gauff	3	Indian Wells Open, United States	Hard	4R	3–6, 6–3, 6–4	58	2025	
38.	Mirra Andreeva	7	Wimbledon, United Kingdom	Grass	QF	7–6^{(7–3)}, 7–6^{(7–2)}	35	2025	
39.	(Italy) Jasmine Paolini	8	United Cup, Australia	Hard	RR	6–4, 6–3	11	2026	
40.	(Poland) Iga Świątek	2	United Cup, Australia	Hard	F	3–6, 6–0, 6–3	11	2026	
41.	(United States) Amanda Anisimova	6	Miami Open, United States	Hard	4R	6–2, 6–2	12	2026	

- Key: (Rk) first use, opponent rank; (Rd) round; (Rk) 2nd use, player rank; (Ref) reference; (F) final; (SF) semifinal; (QF) quarterfinal; (#R) rounds 4, 3, 2, 1; (RR) round-robin stage; (Q#) qualifying rounds or stages (3), 2, 1.

== Longest winning streak ==
=== 12 match winning streak (2019) ===
#	Tournament	Category	Start date	Surface	Rd	Opponent	Rank	Score
–	St. Petersburg Trophy	Premier	28 January 2019	Hard (i)	Q2	(Russia) Veronika Kudermetova	No. 108	4–6, 3–6
1	Fed Cup	Team Event	9 February 2019	Hard (i)	–	(Italy) Sara Errani	No. 124	6–2, 7–5
2	Fed Cup	Team Event	9 February 2019	Hard (i)	–	(Italy) Camila Giorgi	No. 28	6–2, 6–4
3	Dubai Tennis Championships	Premier 5	17 February 2019	Hard	1R	(Czech Republic) Lucie Hradecká	No. 361	6–4, 7–6^{(8–6)}
4	Dubai Tennis Championships	Premier 5	17 February 2019	Hard	2R	(Switzerland) Stefanie Vögele	No. 83	6–1, 6–1
5	Dubai Tennis Championships	Premier 5	17 February 2019	Hard	3R	(Belarus) Aryna Sabalenka	No. 9	6–4, 2–6, 7–6^{(9–7)}
6	Dubai Tennis Championships	Premier 5	17 February 2019	Hard	QF	(Romania) Simona Halep	No. 2	4–6, 6–4, 6–2
7	Dubai Tennis Championships	Premier 5	17 February 2019	Hard	SF	(Ukraine) Elina Svitolina	No. 6	6–2, 3–6, 7–6^{(7–3)}
8	Dubai Tennis Championships	Premier 5	17 February 2019	Hard	F	(Czech Republic) Petra Kvitová	No. 4	6–3, 1–6, 6–2
9	Indian Wells Open	Premier Mandatory	6 March 2019	Hard	2R	(Belgium) Alison Van Uytvanck	No. 51	6–4, 6–1
10	Indian Wells Open	Premier Mandatory	6 March 2019	Hard	3R	(Russia) Ekaterina Alexandrova	No. 59	6–4, 6–2
11	Indian Wells Open	Premier Mandatory	6 March 2019	Hard	4R	(Japan) Naomi Osaka	No. 1	6–3, 6–1
12	Indian Wells Open	Premier Mandatory	6 March 2019	Hard	QF	(Czech Republic) Karolína Plíšková	No. 5	6–3, 4–6, 6–3
–	Indian Wells Open	Premier Mandatory	6 March 2019	Hard	SF	(Germany) Angelique Kerber	No. 8	4–6, 2–6
