= 2016 Neva Cup =

- Date: 19–25 September
- Edition: 5th
- Category: ITF Women's Circuit
- Prize money: $100,000
- Surface: Hard (indoor)
- Location: Saint Petersburg, Russia

Champions

Singles
- (Russia) Natalia Vikhlyantseva

Doubles
- (Russia) Maria Marfutina / (Russia) Anna Morgina
- Neva Cup

The 2016 Neva Cup was a professional tennis tournament played on indoor hard courts. It was the 5th edition of the tournament and part of the 2016 ITF Women's Circuit, offering a total of $100,000 in prize money. It took place in Saint Petersburg, Russia, on 19–25 September 2016.

== Singles main draw entrants ==
=== Seeds ===
Country	Player	Rank^{1}	Seed
TUR	Çağla Büyükakçay	60	1
RUS	Evgeniya Rodina	96	2
CRO	Donna Vekić	102	3
RUS	Irina Khromacheva	106	4
NED	Richèl Hogenkamp	136	5
RUS	Ekaterina Alexandrova	148	6
RUS	Alla Kudryavtseva	162	7
UZB	Sabina Sharipova	163	8

- ^{1} Rankings as of 12 September 2016.

=== Other entrants ===
The following player received a wildcard into the singles main draw:

- (Russia) Anastasia Bukhanko
- (Russia) Maria Marfutina
- (Russia) Ksenia Pervak
- (Russia) Polina Vinogradova

The following players received entry from the qualifying draw:

- (Serbia) Vesna Dolonc
- (Belarus) Ilona Kremen
- (Russia) Alena Tarasova
- (Ukraine) Katarina Zavatska

== Champions ==
=== Singles ===
- (Russia) Natalia Vikhlyantseva def. (Croatia) Donna Vekić, 6–1, 6–2

=== Doubles ===
- (Russia) Maria Marfutina / (Russia) Anna Morgina def. (Romania) Raluca Olaru / (Russia) Alena Tarasova, 6–2, 6–3
