= 2016 Neva Cup – Singles =

Singles
- 2016 Neva Cup

Final
- Champion: (Russia) Natalia Vikhlyantseva
- Runner-up: (Croatia) Donna Vekić
- Score: 6–1, 6–2

Events
| Singles | Doubles |
| ← 2015 · | Neva Cup | · 2017 → |

Polina Leykina was the defending champion, but chose to participate in Saint-Malo instead.

Natalia Vikhlyantseva won the title, defeating Donna Vekić in the final, 6–1, 6–2.

== Seeds ==
1. (Turkey) Çağla Büyükakçay (second round)
2. (Russia) Evgeniya Rodina (quarterfinals)
3. (Croatia) Donna Vekić (final)
4. (Russia) Irina Khromacheva (semifinals)
5. (Netherlands) Richèl Hogenkamp (first round)
6. (Russia) Ekaterina Alexandrova (second round)
7. (Russia) Alla Kudryavtseva (quarterfinals, retired)
8. (Uzbekistan) Sabina Sharipova (first round)

== Main draw ==
=== Key ===
- Q = Qualifier
- WC = Wild card
- LL = Lucky loser
- Alt = Alternate
- SE = Special exempt
- PR = Protected ranking
- ITF = ITF entry
- JE = Junior exempt
- w/o = Walkover
- r = Retired
- d = Defaulted
- SR = Special ranking

=== Finals ===
Semifinals
(Russia) Natalia Vikhlyantseva | 6 | 6
4 | (Russia) Irina Khromacheva | 3 | 2
3 | (Croatia) Donna Vekić | 6 | 4 | 6
(Belarus) Aryna Sabalenka | 1 | 6 | 1

Final
(Russia) Natalia Vikhlyantseva | 6 | 6
3 | (Croatia) Donna Vekić | 1 | 2

=== Top half ===
First round
1 | (Turkey) Ç Büyükakçay | 6 | 6
WC | (Russia) K Pervak | 2 | 3
WC | (Russia) A Bukhanko | 2 | 0
(Greece) V Grammatikopoulou | 6 | 6
Q | (Russia) A Tarasova | 6^{3} | 3
(Russia) N Vikhlyantseva | 7^{7} | 6
WC | (Russia) M Marfutina | 6 | 6
8 | (Uzbekistan) S Sharipova | 2 | 2
4 | (Russia) I Khromacheva | 7^{7} | 2 | 6
(Netherlands) L Kerkhove | 6^{5} | 6 | 2
(Russia) V Kan | 3 | 2
(Ukraine) O Fridman | 6 | 6
(Ukraine) V Strakhova | 6 | 4 | 4
(Israel) D Khazaniuk | 4 | 6 | 6
(Belgium) A-S Mestach | 1 | 1
7 | (Russia) A Kudryavtseva | 6 | 6

Second round
1 | (Turkey) Ç Büyükakçay | 3 | 2
(Greece) V Grammatikopoulou | 6 | 6
(Russia) N Vikhlyantseva | 6 | 6
WC | (Russia) M Marfutina | 2 | 4
4 | (Russia) I Khromacheva | 7^{7} | 7
(Ukraine) O Fridman | 6^{0} | 5
(Israel) D Khazaniuk | 4 | 3
7 | (Russia) A Kudryavtseva | 6 | 6

Quarterfinals
(Greece) V Grammatikopoulou | 0 | 0
(Russia) N Vikhlyantseva | 6 | 6
4 | (Russia) I Khromacheva | 6
7 | (Russia) A Kudryavtseva | 6^{r}

Semifinals
(Russia) N Vikhlyantseva | 6 | 6
4 | (Russia) I Khromacheva | 3 | 2

=== Bottom half ===
First round
6 | (Russia) E Alexandrova | 6 | 6
WC | (Russia) P Vinogradova | 3 | 2
Q | (Serbia) V Dolonc | 6 | 6
(Ukraine) O Ianchuk | 0 | 3
(Russia) A Komardina | 6 | 6
(Russia) A Panova | 3 | 3
(Russia) O Doroshina | 3 | 3
3 | (Croatia) D Vekić | 6 | 6
5 | (Netherlands) R Hogenkamp | 4 | 5
(Russia) V Ivakhnenko | 6 | 7
(Russia) A Kalinskaya | 6^{3} | 4
(Belarus) A Sabalenka | 7^{7} | 6
Q | (Ukraine) K Zavatska | 4 | 3
(Russia) A Blinkova | 6 | 6
Q | (Belarus) I Kremen | 6^{7} | 1
2 | (Russia) E Rodina | 7^{9} | 6

Second round
6 | (Russia) E Alexandrova | 3 | 6 | 5
Q | (Serbia) V Dolonc | 6 | 3 | 7
(Russia) A Komardina | 1 | 3
3 | (Croatia) D Vekić | 6 | 6
(Russia) V Ivakhnenko | 2 | 4
(Belarus) A Sabalenka | 6 | 6
(Russia) A Blinkova | 6^{3} | 6^{5}
2 | (Russia) E Rodina | 7^{7} | 7^{7}

Quarterfinals
Q | (Serbia) V Dolonc | 3 | 3
3 | (Croatia) D Vekić | 6 | 6
(Belarus) A Sabalenka | 6 | 6^{5} | 7^{7}
2 | (Russia) E Rodina | 2 | 7^{7} | 6^{5}

Semifinals
3 | (Croatia) D Vekić | 6 | 4 | 6
(Belarus) A Sabalenka | 1 | 6 | 1
