= 2025 Abu Dhabi Open – Doubles =

Doubles
- 2025 Abu Dhabi Open

Final
- Champions: (Latvia) Jeļena Ostapenko (Australia) Ellen Perez
- Runners-up: (France) Kristina Mladenovic (China) Zhang Shuai
- Score: 6–2, 6–1

Details
- Draw: 16
- Seeds: 4

Events
| Singles | Doubles |
| ← 2024 · | Abu Dhabi Open | · 2026 → |

Jeļena Ostapenko and Ellen Perez won the doubles title at the 2025 Abu Dhabi Open, defeating Kristina Mladenovic and Zhang Shuai in the final, 6–2, 6–1.

Sofia Kenin and Bethanie Mattek-Sands were the reigning champions, but they chose not to participate together this year. Kenin partnered Magda Linette, but lost in the first round to Laura Samson and Markéta Vondroušová. Mattek-Sands partnered Lucie Šafářová, but they lost in the first round to Luisa Stefani and Heather Watson.

== Seeds ==
1. (Latvia) Jeļena Ostapenko / (Australia) Ellen Perez (champions)
2. (United States) Asia Muhammad / (Netherlands) Demi Schuurs (first round)
3. (United States) Desirae Krawczyk / (Mexico) Giuliana Olmos (first round)
4. (France) Kristina Mladenovic / (China) Zhang Shuai (final)

== Draw ==
=== Key ===
- Q = Qualifier
- WC = Wild card
- LL = Lucky loser
- Alt = Alternate
- ITF = ITF entry
- PR = Protected ranking
- SR = Special ranking
- SE = Special exempt
- JE = Junior exempt
- JR = Junior Accelerator Programme entrant
- CO = College Accelerator Programme entrant
- NG = Next Gen Accelerator Program entrant
- w/o = Walkover
- r = Retired
- d = Defaulted

=== Draw ===
First round
1 | (Latvia) J Ostapenko (Australia) E Perez | 6 | 6
(Czech Republic) L Nosková (Kazakhstan) Y Putintseva | 2 | 4
(Hungary) T Babos (United States) N Melichar-Martinez | 6 | 4 | [10]
(Chinese Taipei) H-c Chan; L Samsonova | 3 | 6 | [1]
3 | (United States) D Krawczyk (Mexico) G Olmos | 4 | 0
(Norway) U Eikeri (Japan) M Ninomiya | 6 | 6
(United States) S Kenin (Poland) M Linette | 4 | 1
WC | (Czech Republic) L Samson (Czech Republic) M Vondroušová | 6 | 6
WC | (United States) B Mattek-Sands (Czech Republic) L Šafářová | 4 | 4
(Brazil) L Stefani (United Kingdom) H Watson | 6 | 6
(Spain) C Bucșa (Japan) M Kato | 7 | 4 | [8]
4 | (France) K Mladenovic (China) S Zhang | 5 | 6 | [10]
(China) X Jiang (Chinese Taipei) F-h Wu | 6 | 3 | [5]
(Australia) O Gadecki (United Kingdom) O Nicholls | 4 | 6 | [10]
(Japan) S Aoyama (Japan) E Hozumi | 2 | 6 | [10]
2 | (United States) A Muhammad (Netherlands) D Schuurs | 6 | 1 | [8]

Quarterfinals
1 | (Latvia) J Ostapenko (Australia) E Perez | 6 | 6
(Hungary) T Babos (United States) N Melichar-Martinez | 4 | 4
(Norway) U Eikeri (Japan) M Ninomiya | 4 | 1
WC | (Czech Republic) L Samson (Czech Republic) M Vondroušová | 6 | 6
(Brazil) L Stefani (United Kingdom) H Watson | 7 | 2 | [3]
4 | (France) K Mladenovic (China) S Zhang | 5 | 6 | [10]
(Australia) O Gadecki (United Kingdom) O Nicholls | 7 | 4 | [10]
(Japan) S Aoyama (Japan) E Hozumi | 5 | 6 | [8]

Semifinals
1 | (Latvia) J Ostapenko (Australia) E Perez | 6 | 6
WC | (Czech Republic) L Samson (Czech Republic) M Vondroušová | 3 | 2
4 | (France) K Mladenovic (China) S Zhang | 6 | 6
(Australia) O Gadecki (United Kingdom) O Nicholls | 1 | 4

Final
1 | (Latvia) J Ostapenko (Australia) E Perez | 6 | 6
4 | (France) K Mladenovic (China) S Zhang | 2 | 1
