= 2025 Abu Dhabi Open =

- Date: 1–8 February
- Edition: 4th
- Category: WTA 500
- Draw: 28S / 16D
- Surface: Hard / outdoor
- Location: Abu Dhabi, UAE
- Venue: Zayed Sports City International Tennis Centre

Champions

Singles
- (Switzerland) Belinda Bencic

Doubles
- (Latvia) Jeļena Ostapenko / (Australia) Ellen Perez
- Abu Dhabi Open

The 2025 Mubadala Abu Dhabi Open was a professional women's tennis tournament played on outdoor hard courts. It was the third edition of the tournament, and a WTA 500 event on the 2025 WTA Tour. It took place at the Zayed Sports City International Tennis Centre in Abu Dhabi, from 1 February until 8 February 2025.

== Finals ==
=== Singles ===
- (Switzerland) Belinda Bencic def. (United States) Ashlyn Krueger, 4–6, 6–1, 6–1

=== Doubles ===
- (Latvia) Jeļena Ostapenko / (Australia) Ellen Perez def. (France) Kristina Mladenovic / (China) Zhang Shuai, 6–2, 6–1

== Singles main-draw entrants ==
=== Seeds ===
Country	Player	Rank^{1}	Seed
KAZ	Elena Rybakina	5	1
ESP	Paula Badosa	10	2
	Daria Kasatkina	11	3
KAZ	Yulia Putintseva	20	4
	Liudmila Samsonova	21	5
	Anastasia Pavlyuchenkova	23	6
LAT	Jeļena Ostapenko	26	7
CAN	Leylah Fernandez	27	8

- ^{1} Rankings are as of 27 January 2025

=== Other entrants ===
The following players received a wildcard into the singles main draw:

- (Switzerland) Belinda Bencic
- (France) Caroline Garcia
- (United Kingdom) Emma Raducanu
- (Czech Republic) Markéta Vondroušová

The following players received entry from the qualifying draw:

- (United Kingdom) Sonay Kartal
- (United States) Sofia Kenin
- (United States) McCartney Kessler
- (Japan) Wakana Sonobe
- (United States) Katie Volynets
- (Mexico) Renata Zarazúa

The following players received entry as lucky losers:

- Veronika Kudermetova
- (Japan) Moyuka Uchijima

=== Withdrawals ===
- Ekaterina Alexandrova → replaced by (Japan) Moyuka Uchijima
- Polina Kudermetova → replaced by Veronika Kudermetova
- (United Kingdom) Katie Boulter → replaced by (New Zealand) Lulu Sun
- (United States) Danielle Collins → replaced by (Poland) Magda Linette
- (Brazil) Beatriz Haddad Maia → replaced by (Slovakia) Rebecca Šramková
- (Ukraine) Dayana Yastremska → replaced by (China) Yuan Yue

== Doubles main-draw entrants ==
=== Seeds ===
Country	Player	Country	Player	Rank^{1}	Seed
LAT	Jeļena Ostapenko	AUS	Ellen Perez	17	1
USA	Asia Muhammad	NED	Demi Schuurs	39	2
USA	Desirae Krawczyk	MEX	Giuliana Olmos	49	3
FRA	Kristina Mladenovic	CHN	Zhang Shuai	51	4

- Rankings are as of 27 January 2025

=== Other entrants ===
The following pairs received wildcards into the doubles main draw:

- (United States) Bethanie Mattek-Sands / (Czech Republic) Lucie Šafářová
- (Czech Republic) Laura Samson / (Czech Republic) Markéta Vondroušová
