= 2017 Neva Cup =

- Date: 18–24 September
- Edition: 6th
- Category: ITF Women's Circuit
- Prize money: $100,000
- Surface: Hard / Indoor
- Location: Saint Petersburg, Russia

Champions

Singles
- (Switzerland) Belinda Bencic

Doubles
- (Russia) Anna Blinkova / (Russia) Veronika Kudermetova
← 2016 ·	Neva Cup	· 2018 →

The 2017 Neva Cup was a professional tennis tournament played on indoor hard courts. It was the sixth edition of the tournament and was part of the 2017 ITF Women's Circuit. It took place in Saint Petersburg, Russia, on 18–24 September 2017.

== Singles main draw entrants ==
=== Seeds ===
Country	Player	Rank^{1}	Seed
CRO	Donna Vekić	47	1
FRA	Pauline Parmentier	96	2
BLR	Aryna Sabalenka	116	3
RUS	Anna Blinkova	130	4
RUS	Irina Khromacheva	138	5
UKR	Anhelina Kalinina	175	6
BLR	Vera Lapko	180	7
RUS	Polina Monova	182	8

- ^{1} Rankings as of 11 September 2017.

=== Other entrants ===
The following players received a wildcard into the singles main draw:

- (Kazakhstan) Gozal Ainitdinova
- (Russia) Margarita Lazareva
- (Russia) Polina Leykina
- (Ukraine) Valeriya Strakhova

The following players received entry using protected rankings:

- (Belgium) Ysaline Bonaventure
- (Russia) Vitalia Diatchenko

The following players received entry from the qualifying draw:

- (Russia) Anastasia Gasanova
- (Germany) Vivian Heisen
- (Russia) Sofya Lansere
- (Russia) Elena Rybakina

== Champions ==
=== Singles ===
- (Switzerland) Belinda Bencic def. (Ukraine) Dayana Yastremska, 6–2, 6–3

=== Doubles ===
- (Russia) Anna Blinkova / (Russia) Veronika Kudermetova def. (Switzerland) Belinda Bencic / (Slovakia) Michaela Hončová, 6–3, 6–1
