= 2021 Abu Dhabi Women's Tennis Open =

- Date: 6–13 January
- Edition: 1st
- Category: WTA 500
- Draw: 64S / 28D
- Surface: Hard / outdoor
- Location: Abu Dhabi, UAE
- Venue: Zayed Sports City International Tennis Centre

Champions

Singles
- (Belarus) Aryna Sabalenka

Doubles
- (Japan) Shuko Aoyama / (Japan) Ena Shibahara
Abu Dhabi Open	· 2023 →

The 2021 Abu Dhabi Women's Tennis Open was a women's tennis tournament played on outdoor hard courts. It was the inaugural professional edition of the tournament and a WTA 500 tournament on the 2021 WTA Tour. It took place at the Zayed Sports City International Tennis Centre in Abu Dhabi, from 6 January to 13 January 2021. Fourth-seeded Aryna Sabalenka won the singles title.

== Finals ==
=== Singles ===
- (Belarus) Aryna Sabalenka def. (Russia) Veronika Kudermetova, 6–2, 6–2

=== Doubles ===
- (Japan) Shuko Aoyama / (Japan) Ena Shibahara def. (United States) Hayley Carter / (Brazil) Luisa Stefani, 7–6^{(7–5)}, 6–4

== Points and prize money ==
=== Point distribution ===
Event	W	F	SF	QF	Round of 16	Round of 32	Round of 64	Q	Q2	Q1
Singles	470	305	185	100	55	30	1	25	13	1
Doubles	470	305	185	100	55	1	—	—	—	—

=== Prize money ===
Event	W	F	SF	QF	Round of 16	Round of 32	Round of 64	Q2	Q1
Singles	$68,570	$50,130	$26,745	$12,675	$6,480	$4,100	$2,500	$1,925	$1,000
Doubles	$20,890	$13,370	$8,350	$4,310	$2,670	$2,020	—	—	—
Doubles prize money per team

== Singles main-draw entrants ==
=== Seeds ===
Country	Player	Rank^{1}	Seed
USA	Sofia Kenin	4	1
UKR	Elina Svitolina	5	2
CZE	Karolína Plíšková	6	3
BLR	Aryna Sabalenka	10	4
ESP	Garbiñe Muguruza	15	5
KAZ	Elena Rybakina	19	6
~~BEL~~	~~Elise Mertens~~	~~20~~	~~7~~
CZE	Markéta Vondroušová	21	8
GRE	Maria Sakkari	22	9
EST	Anett Kontaveit	23	10
USA	Jennifer Brady	24	11
CZE	Karolína Muchová	27	12
KAZ	Yulia Putintseva	28	13
~~USA~~	~~Amanda Anisimova~~	~~30~~	~~14~~
TUN	Ons Jabeur	31	15
CRO	Donna Vekić	32	16
RUS	Ekaterina Alexandrova	33	17

- ^{1} Rankings are as of December 21, 2020

=== Other entrants ===
The following players received entry using a protected ranking into the singles main draw:

- (Kazakhstan) Yaroslava Shvedova
- (China) Zhu Lin

The following player received entry as an alternate:

- (Norway) Ulrikke Eikeri

The following players received entry from the qualifying draw:

- (Ukraine) Kateryna Bondarenko
- (Hungary) Anna Bondár
- (Russia) Anastasia Gasanova
- (France) Amandine Hesse
- (Czech Republic) Lucie Hradecká
- (Italy) Lucrezia Stefanini
- (Italy) Bianca Turati
- (China) Yang Zhaoxuan

The following players received entry as lucky losers:

- (United Kingdom) Jodie Burrage
- (Greece) Valentini Grammatikopoulou
- (Greece) Despina Papamichail

=== Withdrawals ===
before the tournament

- (United States) Amanda Anisimova → replaced by (Norway) Ulrikke Eikeri
- (Switzerland) Belinda Bencic → replaced by (Russia) Vera Zvonareva
- (Romania) Sorana Cîrstea → replaced by (Greece) Despina Papamichail
- (United States) Danielle Collins → replaced by (Slovenia) Tamara Zidanšek
- (France) Fiona Ferro → replaced by (United Kingdom) Jodie Burrage
- (France) Caroline Garcia → replaced by (Italy) Jasmine Paolini
- (Russia) Svetlana Kuznetsova → replaced by (China) Wang Xiyu
- (Belgium) Elise Mertens → replaced by (Greece) Valentini Grammatikopoulou
- (Latvia) Jeļena Ostapenko → replaced by (Ukraine) Marta Kostyuk
- (Czech Republic) Kateřina Siniaková → replaced by (Belarus) Aliaksandra Sasnovich
- (Romania) Patricia Maria Țig → replaced by (Russia) Anastasia Potapova
- (Belgium) Alison Van Uytvanck → replaced by (United States) Jamie Loeb
- (China) Zheng Saisai → replaced by (Canada) Leylah Fernandez

during the tournament

- (Czech Republic) Karolína Muchová

=== Retirements ===
- (Belgium) Kirsten Flipkens

== Doubles main-draw entrants ==
=== Seeds ===
Country	Player	Country	Player	Rank^{1}	Seed
TPE	Hsieh Su-wei	CZE	Barbora Krejčíková	8	1
~~BEL~~	~~Elise Mertens~~	~~BLR~~	~~Aryna Sabalenka~~	~~11~~	~~2~~
USA	Nicole Melichar	NED	Demi Schuurs	23	3
~~BEL~~	~~Kirsten Flipkens~~	~~FRA~~	~~Kristina Mladenovic~~	~~33~~	~~4~~
JPN	Shuko Aoyama	JPN	Ena Shibahara	45	5
CHI	Alexa Guarachi	USA	Desirae Krawczyk	51	6
CHN	Xu Yifan	CHN	Yang Zhaoxuan	64	7
USA	Hayley Carter	BRA	Luisa Stefani	68	8

- Rankings are as of December 21, 2020

=== Other entrants ===
The following pairs received entry into the doubles main draw using a protected ranking:

- (Ukraine) Kateryna Bondarenko / (Ukraine) Nadiia Kichenok
- (Kazakhstan) Elena Rybakina / (Kazakhstan) Yaroslava Shvedova

The following pairs received entry into the doubles main draw as alternates:

- (Italy) Jasmine Paolini / (Italy) Martina Trevisan
- (Argentina) Nadia Podoroska / (Spain) Sara Sorribes Tormo

=== Withdrawals ===
Before the tournament

- (Belgium) Elise Mertens / (Belarus) Aryna Sabalenka → replaced by (Argentina) Nadia Podoroska / (Spain) Sara Sorribes Tormo
- (Belgium) Kirsten Flipkens / (France) Kristina Mladenovic → replaced by (Italy) Jasmine Paolini / (Italy) Martina Trevisan

During the tournament

- (Czech Republic) Karolína Muchová / (Czech Republic) Markéta Vondroušová
