= 2016 Neva Cup – Doubles =

Doubles
- 2016 Neva Cup

Final
- Champions: (Russia) Maria Marfutina (Russia) Anna Morgina
- Runners-up: (Romania) Raluca Olaru (Russia) Alena Tarasova
- Score: 6–2, 6–3

Events
Singles	Doubles
← 2015 ·	Neva Cup	· 2017 →

Carolin Daniels and Lidziya Marozava were the defending champions, but chose not to participate.

Maria Marfutina and Anna Morgina won the title, defeating Raluca Olaru and Alena Tarasova in the final, 6–2, 6–3.

== Seeds ==
1. (Russia) Natela Dzalamidze / (Netherlands) Lesley Kerkhove (semifinals)
2. (Russia) Irina Khromacheva / (Belgium) An-Sophie Mestach (quarterfinals, retired)
3. (Russia) Valentyna Ivakhnenko / (Russia) Anastasiya Komardina (first round)
4. (Slovakia) Michaela Hončová / (Belarus) Ilona Kremen (semifinals)

== Draw ==
=== Key ===
- Q = Qualifier
- WC = Wild card
- LL = Lucky loser
- Alt = Alternate
- SE = Special exempt
- PR = Protected ranking
- ITF = ITF entry
- JE = Junior exempt
- w/o = Walkover
- r = Retired
- d = Defaulted
- SR = Special ranking

First round
1	(Russia) N Dzalamidze (Netherlands) L Kerkhove	6	6
(Russia) O Doroshina (Russia) P Monova	3	2
(Russia) A Frolova (Russia) A Gabueva	6	6
WC	(Russia) V Pogrebnyak (Russia) P Vinogradova	0	4
3	(Russia) V Ivakhnenko (Russia) A Komardina	4	1
(Romania) R Olaru (Russia) A Tarasova	6	6
(Uzbekistan) S Sharipova (Russia) E Yashina	6	6
WC	(Russia) D Mishina (Russia) E Semenova	3	0
(Ukraine) O Ianchuk (Ukraine) A Vasylyeva	7	1	[9]
(Greece) V Grammatikopoulou (Russia) A Kalinskaya	5	6	[11]
WC	(Russia) A Bukhanko (Ukraine) V Strakhova	0	1
4	(Slovakia) M Hončová (Belarus) I Kremen	6	6
(Netherlands) R Hogenkamp (Russia) M Lazareva	2	6	[5]
(Russia) M Marfutina (Russia) A Morgina	6	4	[10]
(Uzbekistan) A Amanmuradova (Russia) V Diatchenko	5	2
2	(Russia) I Khromacheva (Belgium) A-S Mestach	7	6

Quarterfinals
1	(Russia) N Dzalamidze (Netherlands) L Kerkhove	6	7^{7}
(Russia) A Frolova (Russia) A Gabueva	1	6^{5}
(Romania) R Olaru (Russia) A Tarasova	6	6
(Uzbekistan) S Sharipova (Russia) E Yashina	3	1
(Greece) V Grammatikopoulou (Russia) A Kalinskaya	6	1	[5]
4	(Slovakia) M Hončová (Belarus) I Kremen	2	6	[10]
(Russia) M Marfutina (Russia) A Morgina	2
2	(Russia) I Khromacheva (Belgium) A-S Mestach	1^{r}

Semifinals
1	(Russia) N Dzalamidze (Netherlands) L Kerkhove	5	3
(Romania) R Olaru (Russia) A Tarasova	7	6
4	(Slovakia) M Hončová (Belarus) I Kremen	6	6^{1}	[8]
(Russia) M Marfutina (Russia) A Morgina	2	7^{7}	[10]

Final
(Romania) R Olaru (Russia) A Tarasova	2	3
(Russia) M Marfutina (Russia) A Morgina	6	6
