= 2021 Abu Dhabi Women's Tennis Open – Singles =

Singles
- 2021 Abu Dhabi Women's Tennis Open

Final
- Champion: (Belarus) Aryna Sabalenka
- Runner-up: (Russia) Veronika Kudermetova
- Score: 6–2, 6–2

Details
- Draw: 64S / 32Q
- Seeds: 17

Events
Singles	Doubles
Abu Dhabi Open	· 2023 →

This was a new tournament in 2021.

Aryna Sabalenka won the title, defeating first-time finalist Veronika Kudermetova in the final, 6–2, 6–2. This was Sabalenka's third consecutive title, and her victory against Kudermetova in the final was her 15th consecutive victory, with both streaks dating back to Ostrava in 2020.

== Seeds ==
1. (United States) Sofia Kenin (quarterfinals)
2. (Ukraine) Elina Svitolina (quarterfinals)
3. (Czech Republic) Karolína Plíšková (second round)
4. (Belarus) Aryna Sabalenka (champion)
5. (Spain) Garbiñe Muguruza (third round)
6. (Kazakhstan) Elena Rybakina (quarterfinals)
7. (Belgium) Elise Mertens (withdrew)
8. (Czech Republic) Markéta Vondroušová (first round)
9. (Greece) Maria Sakkari (semifinals)
10. (Estonia) Anett Kontaveit (first round)
11. (United States) Jennifer Brady (first round)
12. (Czech Republic) Karolína Muchová (second round, withdrew)
13. (Kazakhstan) Yulia Putintseva (third round)
14. (United States) Amanda Anisimova (withdrew)
15. (Tunisia) Ons Jabeur (third round)
16. (Croatia) Donna Vekić (first round)
17. (Russia) Ekaterina Alexandrova (third round)

Click on the seed number of a player to go to their draw section.

== Draw ==
=== Key ===
- Q = Qualifier
- WC = Wild card
- LL = Lucky loser
- Alt = Alternate
- SE = Special exempt
- PR = Protected ranking
- ITF = ITF entry
- JE = Junior exempt
- w/o = Walkover
- r = Retired
- d = Defaulted
- SR = Special ranking

=== Finals ===
Quarterfinals
1	(United States) Sofia Kenin	6	2	0
9	(Greece) Maria Sakkari	2	6	6
4	(Belarus) Aryna Sabalenka	6	4	6
6	(Kazakhstan) Elena Rybakina	4	6	3
(Ukraine) Marta Kostyuk	0	6	6
(Spain) Sara Sorribes Tormo	6	1	4
(Russia) Veronika Kudermetova	5	6	7^{7}
2	(Ukraine) Elina Svitolina	7	3	6^{3}

Semifinals
9	(Greece) Maria Sakkari	3	2
4	(Belarus) Aryna Sabalenka	6	6
(Ukraine) Marta Kostyuk	6^{8}	4
(Russia) Veronika Kudermetova	7^{10}	6

Final
4	(Belarus) Aryna Sabalenka	6	6
(Russia) Veronika Kudermetova	2	2

=== Top half ===
==== Section 1 ====
First round
1	(United States) S Kenin	7^{7}	6
Q	(China) Z Yang	6^{4}	2
(Germany) L Siegemund	7	5	4
(Belgium) K Flipkens	5	7	6
(Czech Republic) B Krejčíková	6	6
(United States) J Loeb	1	3
(Italy) M Trevisan	3	3
13	(Kazakhstan) Y Putintseva	6	6
9	(Greece) M Sakkari	6	6
(Russia) A Potapova	4	2
(United States) C Gauff	6	6
Alt	(Norway) U Eikeri	0	1
(Belarus) A Sasnovich	6	6
Q	(Hungary) A Bondár	2	3
(France) K Mladenovic	2	4
5	(Spain) G Muguruza	6	6

Second round
1	(United States) S Kenin	5	5
(Belgium) K Flipkens	7	4^{r}
(Czech Republic) B Krejčíková	4	5
13	(Kazakhstan) Y Putintseva	6	7
9	(Greece) M Sakkari	7	6
(United States) C Gauff	5	2
(Belarus) A Sasnovich	1	4
5	(Spain) G Muguruza	6	6

Third round
1	(United States) S Kenin	3	7^{7}	6
13	(Kazakhstan) Y Putintseva	6	6^{5}	4
9	(Greece) M Sakkari	7	6
5	(Spain) G Muguruza	5	4

Quarterfinals
1	(United States) S Kenin	6	2	0
9	(Greece) M Sakkari	2	6	6

==== Section 2 ====
First round
4	(Belarus) A Sabalenka	7^{7}	6
(Slovenia) P Hercog	6^{5}	2
(Australia) A Tomljanović	6	7^{7}
PR	(China) L Zhu	2	6^{1}
Q	(Ukraine) K Bondarenko	6	3	7
(China) Y Wang	3	6	5
(Russia) A Pavlyuchenkova	6^{3}	3
15	(Tunisia) O Jabeur	7^{7}	6
12	(Czech Republic) K Muchová	6	6
(Montenegro) D Kovinić	4	1
(Russia) D Kasatkina	6	3	6
(China) Q Wang	2	6	2
(Netherlands) A Rus	3	6	4
(China) Xiy Wang	6	3	6
Q	(Italy) L Stefanini	1	3
6	(Kazakhstan) E Rybakina	6	6

Second round
4	(Belarus) A Sabalenka	7	6
(Australia) A Tomljanović	5	4
Q	(Ukraine) K Bondarenko	7	3	2
15	(Tunisia) O Jabeur	5	6	6
12	(Czech Republic) K Muchová
(Russia) D Kasatkina	w/o
(China) Xiy Wang	4	4
6	(Kazakhstan) E Rybakina	6	6

Third round
4	(Belarus) A Sabalenka	6	6
15	(Tunisia) O Jabeur	2	4
(Russia) D Kasatkina	3	4
6	(Kazakhstan) E Rybakina	6	6

Quarterfinals
4	(Belarus) A Sabalenka	6	4	6
6	(Kazakhstan) E Rybakina	4	6	3

=== Bottom half ===
==== Section 3 ====
First round
8	(Czech Republic) M Vondroušová	6	3	6^{3}
(Chinese Taipei) S-w Hsieh	3	6	7^{7}
(Ukraine) M Kostyuk	6	6
Q	(Czech Republic) L Hradecká	2	4
(Canada) LA Fernandez	6	6
(Italy) J Paolini	4	2
(Slovenia) T Zidanšek	0	6	6
11	(United States) J Brady	6	3	4
16	(Croatia) D Vekić	6^{10}	6	4
(United States) B Pera	7^{12}	2	6
(Spain) S Sorribes Tormo	6	6
(Argentina) N Podoroska	3	3
(Germany) M Barthel	2	4
Q	(Russia) A Gasanova	6	6
LL	(Greece) D Papamichail	2	6^{4}
3	(Czech Republic) Ka Plíšková	6	7^{7}

Second round
(Chinese Taipei) S-w Hsieh	3	7^{7}	3
(Ukraine) M Kostyuk	6	6^{4}	6
(Canada) LA Fernandez	4	4
(Slovenia) T Zidanšek	6	6
(United States) B Pera	7	3	4
(Spain) S Sorribes Tormo	5	6	6
Q	(Russia) A Gasanova	6	6
3	(Czech Republic) Ka Plíšková	2	4

Third round
(Ukraine) M Kostyuk	6	6
(Slovenia) T Zidanšek	1	1
(Spain) S Sorribes Tormo	7	6
Q	(Russia) A Gasanova	5	3

Quarterfinals
(Ukraine) M Kostyuk	0	6	6
(Spain) S Sorribes Tormo	6	1	4

==== Section 4 ====
First round
LL	(Greece) V Grammatikopoulou	2	2
(France) A Cornet	6	6
(Latvia) A Sevastova	2	7	2
(Spain) P Badosa	6	5	6
Q	(Italy) B Turati	6	6
PR	(Kazakhstan) Y Shvedova	1	2
(Russia) V Kudermetova	7	6
10	(Estonia) A Kontaveit	5	1
17	(Russia) E Alexandrova	6	6
(Kazakhstan) Z Diyas	4	4
(United Kingdom) H Watson	4	6	7
LL	(United Kingdom) J Burrage	6	2	5
(Russia) V Zvonareva	6	6
Q	(France) A Hesse	3	4
(United States) J Pegula	4	3
2	(Ukraine) E Svitolina	6	6

Second round
(France) A Cornet	4	4
(Spain) P Badosa	6	6
Q	(Italy) B Turati	2	1
(Russia) V Kudermetova	6	6
17	(Russia) E Alexandrova	7	6^{7}	6
(United Kingdom) H Watson	5	7^{9}	3
(Russia) V Zvonareva	4	1
2	(Ukraine) E Svitolina	6	6

Third round
(Spain) P Badosa	4	6	1
(Russia) V Kudermetova	6	4	6
17	(Russia) E Alexandrova	2	7^{7}	6^{8}
2	(Ukraine) E Svitolina	6	6^{5}	7^{10}

Quarterfinals
(Russia) V Kudermetova	5	6	7^{7}
2	(Ukraine) E Svitolina	7	3	6^{3}

== Qualifying ==
=== Seeds ===
1. (Croatia) Tena Lukas (first round)
2. (Norway) Ulrikke Eikeri (moved to main draw)
3. (United Kingdom) Jodie Burrage (qualifying competition, lucky loser)
4. (Greece) Valentini Grammatikopoulou (qualifying competition, lucky loser)
5. (Spain) Andrea Lázaro García (first round)
6. (Hungary) Anna Bondár (qualified)
7. (Greece) Despina Papamichail (qualifying competition, lucky loser)
8. (United States) Catherine Harrison (first round)
9. (Kazakhstan) Anna Danilina (first round)
10. (Ukraine) Kateryna Bondarenko (qualified)
11. (France) Amandine Hesse (qualified)
12. (Russia) Anastasia Gasanova (qualified)
13. (Italy) Jessica Pieri (qualifying competition)
14. (Italy) Martina Caregaro (qualifying competition)
15. (Romania) Irina Fetecău (qualifying competition)
16. (Sweden) Mirjam Björklund (first round)

=== Qualifiers ===
1. (Italy) Lucrezia Stefanini
2. (Russia) Anastasia Gasanova
3. (France) Amandine Hesse
4. (Ukraine) Kateryna Bondarenko
5. (Czech Republic) Lucie Hradecká
6. (Hungary) Anna Bondár
7. (China) Yang Zhaoxuan
8. (Italy) Bianca Turati

=== Lucky losers ===
1. (United Kingdom) Jodie Burrage
2. (Greece) Valentini Grammatikopoulou
3. (Greece) Despina Papamichail

=== Qualifying draw ===
==== First qualifier ====
First round
1	(Croatia) Tena Lukas	6	4	2
(Italy) Lucrezia Stefanini	4	6	6
(India) Riya Bhatia	2	1
15	(Romania) Irina Fetecău	6	6

Qualifying competition
(Italy) Lucrezia Stefanini	1	6	7^{7}
15	(Romania) Irina Fetecău	6	2	6^{3}

==== Second qualifier ====
First round
Alt	(Japan) Makoto Ninomiya	1	4
(Japan) Ena Shibahara	6	6
(Mexico) Giuliana Olmos	5	3
12	(Russia) Anastasia Gasanova	7	6

Qualifying competition
(Japan) Ena Shibahara	6	5	2
12	(Russia) Anastasia Gasanova	4	7	6

==== Third qualifier ====
First round
3	(United Kingdom) Jodie Burrage	6	6
(Ukraine) Nadiia Kichenok	2	3
(Spain) Irene Burillo Escorihuela	3	3
11	(France) Amandine Hesse	6	6

Qualifying competition
3	(United Kingdom) Jodie Burrage	3	2
11	(France) Amandine Hesse	6	6

==== Fourth qualifier ====
First round
4	(Greece) Valentini Grammatikopoulou	6	1	6
(Brazil) Luisa Stefani	4	6	1
(Hungary) Panna Udvardy	7^{7}	2	4
10	(Ukraine) Kateryna Bondarenko	6^{5}	6	6

Qualifying competition
4	(Greece) Valentini Grammatikopoulou	1	3
10	(Ukraine) Kateryna Bondarenko	6	6

==== Fifth qualifier ====
First round
5	(Spain) Andrea Lázaro García	6	2	1
(Czech Republic) Lucie Hradecká	1	6	6
PR	(Canada) Carol Zhao	6	2	6
16	(Sweden) Mirjam Björklund	0	6	2

Qualifying competition
(Czech Republic) Lucie Hradecká	7^{9}	6
PR	(Canada) Carol Zhao	6^{7}	1

==== Sixth qualifier ====
First round
6	(Hungary) Anna Bondár	6	6
(Russia) Yana Sizikova	0	1
(Poland) Katarzyna Piter	4	0
13	(Italy) Jessica Pieri	6	6

Qualifying competition
6	(Hungary) Anna Bondár	4	6	7
13	(Italy) Jessica Pieri	6	4	5

==== Seventh qualifier ====
First round
7	(Greece) Despina Papamichail	2	7	6
(Italy) Federica Di Sarra	6	5	1
(China) Yang Zhaoxuan	3	7^{7}	6
9	(Kazakhstan) Anna Danilina	6	6^{4}	4

Qualifying competition
7	(Greece) Despina Papamichail	2	2
(China) Yang Zhaoxuan	6	6

==== Eighth qualifier ====
First round
8	(United States) Catherine Harrison	4	7^{7}	1
(Italy) Bianca Turati	6	6^{4}	6
(Ukraine) Valeriya Strakhova	3	3
14	(Italy) Martina Caregaro	6	6

Qualifying competition
(Italy) Bianca Turati	6	6
14	(Italy) Martina Caregaro	0	3
