= 2025 Abu Dhabi Open – Singles =

Singles
- 2025 Abu Dhabi Open

Final
- Champion: (Switzerland) Belinda Bencic
- Runner-up: (United States) Ashlyn Krueger
- Score: 4–6, 6–1, 6–1

Details
- Draw: 28 (6 Q / 4 WC)
- Seeds: 8

Events
Singles	Doubles
← 2024 ·	Abu Dhabi Open	· 2026 →

Belinda Bencic defeated Ashlyn Krueger in the final, 4–6, 6–1, 6–1, to win the singles tennis title at the 2025 Abu Dhabi Open. This was Bencic's second title in Abu Dhabi (after 2023), her ninth career WTA Tour title, and first title since returning from maternity leave.

Elena Rybakina was the defending champion, but lost to Bencic in the semifinals.

== Seeds ==
The top four seeds received a bye into the second round.

1. (Kazakhstan) Elena Rybakina (semifinals)
2. (Spain) Paula Badosa (second round)
3. Daria Kasatkina (second round)
4. (Kazakhstan) Yulia Putintseva (second round)
5. Liudmila Samsonova (first round)
6. Anastasia Pavlyuchenkova (second round, retired)
7. (Latvia) Jeļena Ostapenko (first round)
8. (Canada) Leylah Fernandez (quarterfinals)

== Draw ==
=== Key ===
- Q = Qualifier
- WC = Wild card
- LL = Lucky loser
- Alt = Alternate
- ITF = ITF entry
- PR = Protected ranking
- SR = Special ranking
- SE = Special exempt
- JE = Junior exempt
- JR = Junior Accelerator Programme entrant
- CO = College Accelerator Programme entrant
- NG = Next Gen Accelerator Program entrant
- w/o = Walkover
- r = Retired
- d = Defaulted

=== Finals ===
Semifinals
1	(Kazakhstan) Elena Rybakina	6	3	4
WC	(Switzerland) Belinda Bencic	3	6	6
(United States) Ashlyn Krueger	7^{7}	6
(Czech Republic) Linda Nosková	6^{2}	4

Final
WC	(Switzerland) Belinda Bencic	4	6	6
(United States) Ashlyn Krueger	6	1	1

=== Top half ===
First round
Q	(United Kingdom) S Kartal	6	4	4
Q	(United States) K Volynets	3	6	6
(China) Y Yuan	4	3
Q	(Japan) W Sonobe	6	6
(Tunisia) O Jabeur	7^{7}	7
7	(Latvia) J Ostapenko	6^{6}	5
WC	(Czech Republic) M Vondroušová	6	6
WC	(United Kingdom) E Raducanu	3	4
WC	(Switzerland) B Bencic	6	3	6
(Slovakia) R Šramková	2	6	1
LL	V Kudermetova	5	6	7^{7}
5	L Samsonova	7	1	6^{5}

Second round
1	(Kazakhstan) E Rybakina	2	6	6
Q	(United States) K Volynets	6	4	4
Q	(Japan) W Sonobe	3	3
(Tunisia) O Jabeur	6	6
4	(Kazakhstan) Y Putintseva	2	3
WC	(Czech Republic) M Vondroušová	6	6
WC	(Switzerland) B Bencic	6	6
LL	V Kudermetova	0	0

Quarterfinals
1	(Kazakhstan) E Rybakina	6	4	7^{7}
(Tunisia) O Jabeur	2	6	6^{4}
WC	(Czech Republic) M Vondroušová	5	3
WC	(Switzerland) B Bencic	7	6

Semifinals
1	(Kazakhstan) E Rybakina	6	3	4
WC	(Switzerland) B Bencic	3	6	6

=== Bottom half ===
First round
8	(Canada) L Fernandez	7^{7}	7^{7}
LL	(Japan) M Uchijima	6^{3}	6^{0}
WC	(France) C Garcia	1	3
(New Zealand) L Sun	6	6
Q	(United States) M Kessler	3	7^{7}	3
(United States) A Krueger	6	6^{4}	6
6	A Pavlyuchenkova	6	6
Q	(United States) S Kenin	3	1
Q	(Mexico) R Zarazúa	4	6^{6}
(Poland) M Linette	6	7^{8}
(Poland) M Fręch	0	3
(Czech Republic) L Nosková	6	6

Second round
8	(Canada) L Fernandez	6	6
(New Zealand) L Sun	0	3
(United States) A Krueger	1	7	6
3	D Kasatkina	6	5	4
6	A Pavlyuchenkova	7	1^{r}
(Poland) M Linette	5	4
(Czech Republic) L Nosková	6	6
2	(Spain) P Badosa	4	1

Quarterfinals
8	(Canada) L Fernandez	5	6	2
(United States) A Krueger	7	4	6
(Poland) M Linette	4	3
(Czech Republic) L Nosková	6	6

Semifinals
(United States) A Krueger	7^{7}	6
(Czech Republic) L Nosková	6^{2}	4

== Qualifying ==
=== Seeds ===
1. Veronika Kudermetova (qualifying competition, lucky loser)
2. (United States) McCartney Kessler (qualified)
3. (Japan) Moyuka Uchijima (qualifying competition, lucky loser)
4. (United States) Katie Volynets (qualified)
5. (Mexico) Renata Zarazúa (qualified)
6. Kamilla Rakhimova (first round)
7. (United States) Sofia Kenin (qualified)
8. Erika Andreeva (first round)
9. (United States) Taylor Townsend (first round)
10. (France) Diane Parry (first round, retired)
11. (United Kingdom) Sonay Kartal (qualified)
12. (United States) Hailey Baptiste (first round)

=== Qualifiers ===
1. (United States) Sofia Kenin
2. (United States) McCartney Kessler
3. (United Kingdom) Sonay Kartal
4. (United States) Katie Volynets
5. (Mexico) Renata Zarazúa
6. (Japan) Wakana Sonobe

=== Lucky losers ===
1. Veronika Kudermetova
2. (Japan) Moyuka Uchijima

=== Qualifying draw ===
==== First qualifier ====
First round
1	Veronika Kudermetova	6	6
WC	(Czech Republic) Laura Samson	1	2
(Japan) Aoi Ito	6^{4}	2
7	(United States) Sofia Kenin	7^{7}	6

Qualifying competition
1	Veronika Kudermetova	6^{3}	2
7	(United States) Sofia Kenin	7^{7}	6

==== Second qualifier ====
First round
2	(United States) McCartney Kessler	6	6
(Ukraine) Yuliia Starodubtseva	2	1
WC	(Serbia) Teodora Kostović	6	0
10	(France) Diane Parry	2	0^{r}

Qualifying competition
2	(United States) McCartney Kessler	6	6
WC	(Serbia) Teodora Kostović	4	2

==== Third qualifier ====
First round
3	(Japan) Moyuka Uchijima	7	6
(Australia) Olivia Gadecki	5	2
(France) Chloé Paquet	6	2	3
11	(United Kingdom) Sonay Kartal	4	6	6

Qualifying competition
3	(Japan) Moyuka Uchijima	1	4
11	(United Kingdom) Sonay Kartal	6	6

==== Fourth qualifier ====
First round
4	(United States) Katie Volynets	6	6
WC	(United Kingdom) Heather Watson	4	3
(Australia) Daria Saville	6^{3}	6	6
8	Erika Andreeva	7^{7}	4	3

Qualifying competition
4	(United States) Katie Volynets	7^{10}	6
(Australia) Daria Saville	6^{8}	3

==== Fifth qualifier ====
First round
5	(Mexico) Renata Zarazúa	6	1
PR	(Belgium) Ysaline Bonaventure	3	0^{r}
(Turkey) Zeynep Sönmez	6	5	7
9	(United States) Taylor Townsend	1	7	5

Qualifying competition
5	(Mexico) Renata Zarazúa	6	6
(Turkey) Zeynep Sönmez	1	2

==== Sixth qualifier ====
First round
6	Kamilla Rakhimova	7	6^{4}	3
(Spain) Cristina Bucșa	5	7^{7}	6
WC	(Japan) Wakana Sonobe	6	6
12	(United States) Hailey Baptiste	3	1

Qualifying competition
(Spain) Cristina Bucșa	3	3
WC	(Japan) Wakana Sonobe	6	6
