= 2026 Abu Dhabi Open – Singles =

Singles
- 2026 Abu Dhabi Open

Final
- Champion: (Czech Republic) Sára Bejlek
- Runner-up: Ekaterina Alexandrova
- Score: 7–6^{(7–5)}, 6–1

Details
- Draw: 28 (4 Q / 4 WC)
- Seeds: 8

Events
Singles	Doubles
- Abu Dhabi Open

Sára Bejlek defeated Ekaterina Alexandrova in the final, 7–6^{(7–5)}, 6–1 to win the singles tennis title at the 2026 Abu Dhabi Open. It was her first WTA Tour title, and she became the first qualifier to win the tournament.

Belinda Bencic was the reigning champion, but withdrew from the tournament due to illness.

== Seeds ==
The top four seeds received a bye into the second round.

1. (Switzerland) Belinda Bencic (withdrew)
2. Ekaterina Alexandrova (final)
3. (Denmark) Clara Tauson (semifinals)
4. (United States) Emma Navarro (second round)
5. Liudmila Samsonova (quarterfinals)
6. (Canada) Leylah Fernandez (second round)
7. (Latvia) Jeļena Ostapenko (second round)
8. (Spain) Paula Badosa (first round)

== Draw ==
Key

- Q = Qualifier
- WC = Wild card
- LL = Lucky loser
- Alt = Alternate
- ITF = ITF entry
- PR = Protected ranking
- SR = Special ranking
- SE = Special exempt
- JE = Junior exempt
- JR = Junior Accelerator Programme entrant
- CO = College Accelerator Programme entrant
- NG = Next Gen Accelerator Program entrant
- w/o = Walkover
- r = Retired
- d = Defaulted

=== Finals ===
Semifinals
Q	(Czech Republic) Sára Bejlek	7	3	7
3	(Denmark) Clara Tauson	5	6	5
WC	(United States) Hailey Baptiste	6	6^{5}	3
2	Ekaterina Alexandrova	3	7^{7}	6

Final
Q	(Czech Republic) Sára Bejlek	7^{7}	6
2	Ekaterina Alexandrova	6^{5}	1

=== Top half ===
First round
Q	(United Kingdom) S Kartal	6	7^{10}
(Spain) C Bucșa	3	6^{8}
(United States) A Krueger	3	0
Q	(Czech Republic) S Bejlek	6	6
Q	O Selekhmeteva	7	6^{4}	2
7	(Latvia) J Ostapenko	5	7^{7}	6
(Australia) D Kasatkina	6^{5}	6	4
Q	(Switzerland) S Waltert	7^{7}	3	6
(United States) M Kessler	6	6
A Pavlyuchenkova	3	3
LL	(France) C Paquet	0	3
6	(Canada) L Fernandez	6	6

Second round
LL	(Mexico) R Zarazua	0	3
Q	(United Kingdom) S Kartal	6	6
Q	(Czech Republic) S Bejlek	6	6
7	(Latvia) J Ostapenko	4	3
3	(Denmark) C Tauson	6	6
Q	(Switzerland) S Waltert	3	1
(United States) M Kessler	6	6
6	(Canada) L Fernandez	3	2

Quarterfinals
Q	(United Kingdom) S Kartal	0	2
Q	(Czech Republic) S Bejlek	6	6
3	(Denmark) C Tauson	6	6
(United States) M Kessler	3	4

Semifinals
Q	(Czech Republic) S Bejlek	7	3	7
3	(Denmark) C Tauson	5	6	5

=== Bottom half ===
First round
5	L Samsonova	6	6
(United States) S Kenin	4	0
(Indonesia) J Tjen	7^{8}	3	6
(Australia) M Joint	6^{6}	6	3
WC	(United States) H Baptiste	4	6	6
WC	(Serbia) T Kostović	6	3	4
8	(Spain) P Badosa	4	6	1
LL	A Sasnovich	6	3	6
(Philippines) A Eala	6	6
WC	(Turkey) Z Sönmez	4	3
(Ukraine) D Yastremska	6	7
PR	(Brazil) B Haddad Maia	2	5

Second round
5	L Samsonova	6	6
(Indonesia) J Tjen	2	2
WC	(United States) H Baptiste	7^{8}	0	6
4	(United States) E Navarro	6^{6}	6	3
LL	A Sasnovich	6	4	6^{5}
(Philippines) A Eala	2	6	7^{7}
(Ukraine) D Yastremska	3	0
2	E Alexandrova	6	6

Quarterfinals
5	L Samsonova	2	6	4
WC	(United States) H Baptiste	6	4	6
(Philippines) A Eala	3	3
2	E Alexandrova	6	6

Semifinals
WC	(United States) H Baptiste	6	6^{5}	3
2	E Alexandrova	3	7^{7}	6

== Qualifying ==
=== Seeds ===
1. (France) Elsa Jacquemot (first round)
2. (United Kingdom) Sonay Kartal (qualified)
3. (United States) Hailey Baptiste (received wild card to main draw)
4. (Mexico) Renata Zarazúa (qualifying competition, retired, lucky loser)
5. (Switzerland) Simona Waltert (qualified)
6. (Czech Republic) Sára Bejlek (qualified)
7. Oksana Selekhmeteva (qualified)
8. Aliaksandra Sasnovich (qualifying competition, lucky loser)

=== Qualifiers ===
1. (Czech Republic) Sára Bejlek
2. (United Kingdom) Sonay Kartal
3. (Switzerland) Simona Waltert
4. Oksana Selekhmeteva

=== Lucky losers ===
1. Aliaksandra Sasnovich
2. (France) Chloé Paquet
3. (Mexico) Renata Zarazúa

=== Qualifying draw ===
==== First qualifier ====
First round
1	(France) Elsa Jacquemot	6	3	3
(France) Chloé Paquet	1	6	6
Ekaterina Ovcharenko	3	0
6	(Czech Republic) Sára Bejlek	6	6

Qualifying competition
(France) Chloé Paquet	2	2
6	(Czech Republic) Sára Bejlek	6	6

==== Second qualifier ====
First round
2	(United Kingdom) Sonay Kartal	6	6
(Ukraine) Yuliia Starodubtseva	4	0
(Australia) Priscilla Hon	5	7^{7}	3
8	Aliaksandra Sasnovich	7	6^{3}	6

Qualifying competition
2	(United Kingdom) Sonay Kartal	6	6
8	Aliaksandra Sasnovich	2	4

==== Third qualifier ====
First round
Alt	(Poland) Katarzyna Piter	6	6
Alt	(United Kingdom) Emily Webley-Smith	4	3
(Australia) Arina Rodionova	2	0^{r}
5	(Switzerland) Simona Waltert	6	1

Qualifying competition
Alt	(Poland) Katarzyna Piter	0	3
5	(Switzerland) Simona Waltert	6	6

==== Fourth qualifier ====
First round
4	(Mexico) Renata Zarazúa	6	6
PR	Vera Zvonareva	3	4
WC	(Australia) Ellen Perez	1	2
7	Oksana Selekhmeteva	6	6

Qualifying competition
4	(Mexico) Renata Zarazúa	1^{r}
7	Oksana Selekhmeteva	3
