= 2026 Abu Dhabi Open – Doubles =

Doubles
- 2026 Abu Dhabi Open

Final
- Champions: Ekaterina Alexandrova (Australia) Maya Joint
- Runners-up: (Slovakia) Tereza Mihalíková (United Kingdom) Olivia Nicholls
- Score: 3–6, 7–6^{(7–5)}, [10–8]

Details
- Draw: 16
- Seeds: 4

Events
Singles	Doubles
- Abu Dhabi Open

Ekaterina Alexandrova and Maya Joint defeated Tereza Mihalíková and Olivia Nicholls in the final, 3–6, 7–6^{(7–5)}, [10–8] to win the doubles tennis title at the 2026 Abu Dhabi Open.

Jeļena Ostapenko and Ellen Perez were the defending champions, but chose not to compete together. Ostapenko partnered Barbora Krejčíková, but they withdrew from their quarterfinal match. Perez partnered Demi Schuurs, but they lost in the quarterfinals to Alexandrova and Joint.

== Seeds ==
1. (United States) Asia Muhammad / (New Zealand) Erin Routliffe (first round)
2. (Spain) Cristina Bucșa / (China) Zhang Shuai (quarterfinals)
3. (Australia) Ellen Perez / (Netherlands) Demi Schuurs (quarterfinals)
4. (Slovakia) Tereza Mihalíková / (United Kingdom) Olivia Nicholls (final)

== Draw ==
Key

- Q = Qualifier
- WC = Wild card
- LL = Lucky loser
- Alt = Alternate
- ITF = ITF entry
- PR = Protected ranking
- SR = Special ranking
- SE = Special exempt
- JE = Junior exempt
- JR = Junior Accelerator Programme entrant
- CO = College Accelerator Programme entrant
- NG = Next Gen Accelerator Program entrant
- w/o = Walkover
- r = Retired
- d = Defaulted

=== Draw ===
First round
1	(United States) A Muhammad (New Zealand) E Routliffe	1	6	[10]
(United States) S Kenin (United States) D Krawczyk	6	2	[12]
(Czech Republic) B Krejčíková (Latvia) J Ostapenko	6	7
L Samsonova (China) Y Xu	2	5
3	(Australia) E Perez (Netherlands) D Schuurs	7^{7}	6
PR	(Japan) S Aoyama; V Zvonareva	6^{4}	4
E Alexandrova (Australia) M Joint	6	6
WC	(Serbia) T Kostović (Ukraine) D Yastremska	2	1
(Chinese Taipei) H-c Chan (Denmark) C Tauson	5	3
PR	I Khromacheva (Slovenia) A Klepač	7	6
PR	(Croatia) D Jurak Schreiber (Poland) K Piter	5	3
4	(Slovakia) T Mihalíková (United Kingdom) O Nicholls	7	6
(Canada) L Fernandez (France) K Mladenovic	5	6	[6]
(Philippines) A Eala (Indonesia) J Tjen	7	3	[10]
(Ukraine) L Kichenok (Ukraine) N Kichenok	1	4
2	(Spain) C Bucșa (China) S Zhang	6	6

Quarterfinals
(United States) S Kenin (United States) D Krawczyk	w/o
(Czech Republic) B Krejčíková (Latvia) J Ostapenko
3	(Australia) E Perez (Netherlands) D Schuurs	4	1
E Alexandrova (Australia) M Joint	6	6
PR	I Khromacheva (Slovenia) A Klepač	7	6^{5}	[8]
4	(Slovakia) T Mihalíková (United Kingdom) O Nicholls	5	7^{7}	[10]
(Philippines) A Eala (Indonesia) J Tjen	6	6
2	(Spain) C Bucșa (China) S Zhang	3	3

Semifinals
(United States) S Kenin (United States) D Krawczyk	3	6^{6}
E Alexandrova (Australia) M Joint	6	7^{8}
4	(Slovakia) T Mihalíková (United Kingdom) O Nicholls	6	6
(Philippines) A Eala (Indonesia) J Tjen	4	2

Final
E Alexandrova (Australia) M Joint	3	7^{7}	[10]
4	(Slovakia) T Mihalíková (United Kingdom) O Nicholls	6	6^{5}	[8]
