= 2021 Abu Dhabi Women's Tennis Open – Doubles =

Doubles
- 2021 Abu Dhabi Women's Tennis Open

Final
- Champions: (Japan) Shuko Aoyama (Japan) Ena Shibahara
- Runners-up: (United States) Hayley Carter (Brazil) Luisa Stefani
- Score: 7–6^{(7–5)}, 6–4

Events
Singles	Doubles
Abu Dhabi Open	· 2023 →

This was the first edition of the tournament. Shuko Aoyama and Ena Shibahara won the title, defeating Hayley Carter and Luisa Stefani in the final, 7–6^{(7–5)}, 6–4.

== Seeds ==
1. (Chinese Taipei) Hsieh Su-wei / (Czech Republic) Barbora Krejčíková (quarterfinals)
2. (Belgium) Elise Mertens / (Belarus) Aryna Sabalenka (withdrew)
3. (United States) Nicole Melichar / (Netherlands) Demi Schuurs (second round)
4. (Belgium) Kirsten Flipkens / (France) Kristina Mladenovic (withdrew)
5. (Japan) Shuko Aoyama / (Japan) Ena Shibahara (champions)
6. (Chile) Alexa Guarachi / (United States) Desirae Krawczyk (first round)
7. (China) Xu Yifan / (China) Yang Zhaoxuan (second round)
8. (United States) Hayley Carter / (Brazil) Luisa Stefani (final)

== Draw ==
=== Key ===
- Q = Qualifier
- WC = Wild card
- LL = Lucky loser
- Alt = Alternate
- SE = Special exempt
- PR = Protected ranking
- ITF = ITF entry
- JE = Junior exempt
- w/o = Walkover
- r = Retired
- d = Defaulted
- SR = Special ranking

=== Finals ===
Semifinals
5	(Japan) Shuko Aoyama (Japan) Ena Shibahara	6	6
(United States) Sofia Kenin (Australia) Ajla Tomljanović	4	3
8	(United States) Hayley Carter (Brazil) Luisa Stefani	7	1	[10]
(Germany) Laura Siegemund (Russia) Vera Zvonareva	5	6	[8]

Final
5	(Japan) Shuko Aoyama (Japan) Ena Shibahara	7^{7}	6
8	(United States) Hayley Carter (Brazil) Luisa Stefani	6^{5}	4

=== Top half ===
First round
(Canada) S Fichman (Mexico) G Olmos	6	7^{7}
(United States) K Christian (Ukraine) L Kichenok	4	6^{3}
(Czech Republic) K Muchová (Czech Republic) M Vondroušová	6	6
PR	(Ukraine) K Bondarenko (Ukraine) N Kichenok	3	0
(Slovenia) A Klepač (Ukraine) M Kostyuk	6	5	[10]
5	(Japan) S Aoyama (Japan) E Shibahara	4	7	[12]
(Georgia (country)) O Kalashnikova (United States) S Santamaria	5	3
(Netherlands) A Rus (Slovenia) T Zidanšek	7	6
(Greece) M Sakkari (Croatia) D Vekić	6	5	[7]
(United States) S Kenin (Australia) A Tomljanović	4	7	[10]
(China) Y Wang (China) L Zhu	1	2
7	(China) Y Xu (China) Z Yang	6	6

Second round
1	(Chinese Taipei) S-w Hsieh (Czech Republic) B Krejčíková	6	5	[12]
(Canada) S Fichman (Mexico) G Olmos	2	7	[10]
(Czech Republic) K Muchová (Czech Republic) M Vondroušová
5	(Japan) S Aoyama (Japan) E Shibahara	w/o
Alt	(Italy) J Paolini (Italy) M Trevisan	6^{5}	3
(Netherlands) A Rus (Slovenia) T Zidanšek	7^{7}	6
(United States) S Kenin (Australia) A Tomljanović	6	7^{7}
7	(China) Y Xu (China) Z Yang	3	6^{4}

Quarterfinals
1	(Chinese Taipei) S-w Hsieh (Czech Republic) B Krejčíková	4	1
5	(Japan) S Aoyama (Japan) E Shibahara	6	6
(Netherlands) A Rus (Slovenia) T Zidanšek	4	4
(United States) S Kenin (Australia) A Tomljanović	6	6

Semifinals
5	(Japan) S Aoyama (Japan) E Shibahara	6	6
(United States) S Kenin (Australia) A Tomljanović	4	3

=== Bottom half ===
First round
8	(United States) H Carter (Brazil) L Stefani	6	6
PR	(Kazakhstan) E Rybakina (Kazakhstan) Y Shvedova	3	3
(Russia) D Kasatkina (Estonia) A Kontaveit	6^{8}	7^{7}	[10]
(Belarus) L Marozava (Belarus) A Sasnovich	7^{10}	6^{4}	[5]
(Czech Republic) L Hradecká (Czech Republic) R Voráčová	5	3
(Russia) V Kudermetova (Russia) A Potapova	7	6
6	(Chile) A Guarachi (United States) D Krawczyk	4	6	[8]
(Russia) E Alexandrova (Russia) Y Sizikova	6	3	[10]
(United States) J Brady (Spain) G Muguruza	4	7^{7}	[10]
(United States) C Gauff (United States) J Pegula	6	6^{3}	[8]
(Germany) L Siegemund (Russia) V Zvonareva	7	6
(Croatia) D Jurak (Japan) M Ninomiya	5	4

Second round
8	(United States) H Carter (Brazil) L Stefani	6	6
(Russia) D Kasatkina (Estonia) A Kontaveit	3	4
(Russia) V Kudermetova (Russia) A Potapova	6	6
3	(United States) N Melichar (Netherlands) D Schuurs	2	2
(Russia) E Alexandrova (Russia) Y Sizikova	3	4
(United States) J Brady (Spain) G Muguruza	6	6
(Germany) L Siegemund (Russia) V Zvonareva	6	2	[10]
Alt	(Argentina) N Podoroska (Spain) S Sorribes Tormo	4	6	[6]

Quarterfinals
8	(United States) H Carter (Brazil) L Stefani	4	6	[10]
(Russia) V Kudermetova (Russia) A Potapova	6	4	[4]
(United States) J Brady (Spain) G Muguruza	7^{9}	1	[8]
(Germany) L Siegemund (Russia) V Zvonareva	6^{7}	6	[10]

Semifinals
8	(United States) H Carter (Brazil) L Stefani	7	1	[10]
(Germany) L Siegemund (Russia) V Zvonareva	5	6	[8]
