= Bianca Turati =

Former italian tennis player (born 1997)

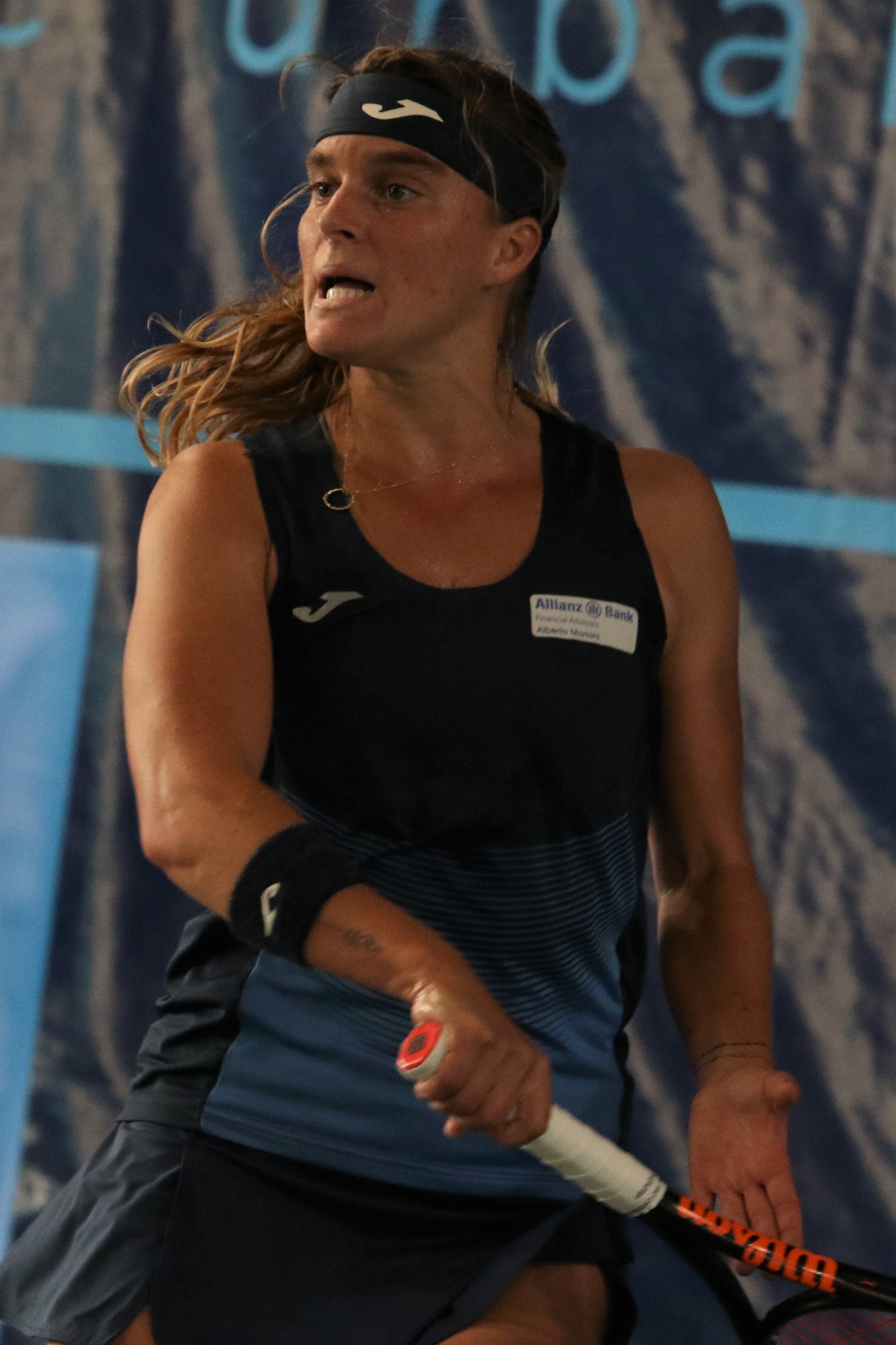
- Turati at the 2021 ITF Poitiers
- Country (sports): Italy
- Born: 17 June 1997 (age 28) Como, Italy
- Height: 1.73 m (5 ft 8 in)
- Retired: 2022
- Plays: Right-handed (one-handed backhand)
- College: The University of Texas at Austin
- Prize money: US$ 89,247

Singles
- Career record: 192–133
- Career titles: 8 ITF
- Highest ranking: No. 259 (12 April 2021)

Doubles
- Career record: 32–38
- Career titles: 2 ITF
- Highest ranking: No. 382 (9 May 2022)

Bianca Turati (born 17 June 1997) is an Italian former tennis player.

Turati has a career-high singles ranking by the Women's Tennis Association (WTA) of 259, achieved on 12 April 2021. In May 2022, she reached her best doubles ranking of 382.

Turati made her WTA Tour main-draw debut at the 2021 Abu Dhabi Open by defeating Martina Caregaro in the final qualifying round. She then stunned former world No. 25, Yaroslava Shvedova, before losing to eventual finalist Veronika Kudermetova.

Her twin sister Anna is also a professional tennis player.

Turati announced her retirement from tennis in September 2022.

== ITF Circuit finals ==
=== Singles: 15 (8 titles, 7 runner-ups) ===
Legend $25,000 tournaments $15,000 tournaments $10,000 tournaments	Finals by surface Hard (2–0) Clay (6–7)

Result	W–L	Date	Tournament	Tier	Surface	Opponent	Score
Win	1–0	Aug 2014	ITF Duino Aurisina, Italy	10,000	Clay	(Croatia) Iva Primorac	1–6, 6–1, 7–6^{(7)}
Win	2–0	May 2015	ITF Pula, Italy	10,000	Clay	(Spain) Aliona Bolsova	2–6, 6–4, 7–5
Loss	2–1	Sep 2015	ITF Pula, Italy	10,000	Clay	(Italy) Jessica Pieri	1–6, 6–3, 4–6
Loss	2–2	Apr 2016	ITF Pula, Italy	10,000	Clay	(Russia) Olesya Pervushina	6–7^{(1)}, 3–6
Loss	2–3	Aug 2016	ITF Sezze, Italy	10,000	Clay	(Russia) Maria Marfutina	4–6, 0–6
Loss	2–4	Jun 2017	ITF Hammamet, Tunisia	15,000	Clay	(Chile) Fernanda Brito	0–6, 2–6
Loss	2–5	Oct 2017	ITF Hilton Head, United States	15,000	Clay	(Norway) Ulrikke Eikeri	4–6, 1–6
Loss	2–6	Jul 2018	ITF Schio, Italy	15,000	Clay	(Italy) Nastassja Burnett	1–6, 5–7
Win	3–6	Aug 2018	ITF Biella, Italy	15,000	Clay	(Italy) Nastassja Burnett	6–3, 6–4
Win	4–6	Aug 2018	ITF Sezze, Italy	15,000	Clay	(Italy) Nastassja Burnett	6–2, 6–1
Loss	4–7	Aug 2018	ITF Cuneo, Italy	15,000	Clay	(Brazil) Paula Cristina Gonçalves	4–6, 2–6
Win	5–7	Sep 2018	ITF Hilton Head, United States	15,000	Clay	(Czech Republic) Michaela Bayerlová	7–6^{(0)}, 6–2
Win	6–7	Jun 2019	ITF Tarvisio, Italy	25,000	Clay	(Brazil) Paula Cristina Gonçalves	6–3, 6–1
Win	7–7	Oct 2019	ITF Austin, United States	15,000	Hard	(Italy) Anna Turati	3–6, 6–3, 6–2
Win	8–7	Nov 2019	ITF Malibu, United States	25,000	Hard	(United States) Katie Volynets	4–6, 6–4, 6–4

=== Doubles: 4 (2 titles, 2 runner–ups) ===
Result	W–L	Date	Tournament	Tier	Surface	Partner	Opponents	Score
Win	1–0	Sep 2015	ITF Pula, Italy	10,000	Clay	(Russia) Liudmila Samsonova	(Belgium) India Maggen (Switzerland) Tess Sugnaux	6–4, 6–2
Loss	1–1	Jul 2018	ITF Curtea de Argeș, Romania	15,000	Clay	(Italy) Anna Turati	(United States) Elizabeth Mandlik (Romania) Andreea Mitu	4–6, 5–7
Win	2–1	Oct 2019	ITF Austin, United States	15,000	Clay	(Italy) Anna Turati	(Argentina) Melany Solange Krywoj (Chile) Fernanda Labraña	6–3, 1–6, [10–4]
Loss	2–2	Apr 2022	ITF Pula, Italy	25,000	Clay	(Italy) Anna Turati	(Russia) Darya Astakhova (Russia) Ekaterina Reyngold	6–7^{(6)}, 4–6
