= 2017 Neva Cup – Singles =

Women's tennis event in Saint Petersburg

Singles
- 2017 Neva Cup

Final
- Champion: (Switzerland) Belinda Bencic
- Runner-up: (Ukraine) Dayana Yastremska
- Score: 6–2, 6–3

Events
Singles	Doubles
← 2016 ·	Neva Cup	· 2018 →

Natalia Vikhlyantseva was the defending champion, but chose not to participate.

Belinda Bencic won the title, defeating Dayana Yastremska in the final, 6–2, 6–3.

== Seeds ==
1. (Croatia) Donna Vekić (semifinals; retired)
2. (France) Pauline Parmentier (second round)
3. (Belarus) Aryna Sabalenka (quarterfinals)
4. (Russia) Anna Blinkova (second round)
5. (Russia) Irina Khromacheva (first round)
6. (Ukraine) Anhelina Kalinina (semifinals)
7. (Belarus) Vera Lapko (second round)
8. (Russia) Polina Monova (first round)

== Draw ==
=== Key ===
- Q = Qualifier
- WC = Wild card
- LL = Lucky loser
- Alt = Alternate
- SE = Special exempt
- PR = Protected ranking
- ITF = ITF entry
- JE = Junior exempt
- w/o = Walkover
- r = Retired
- d = Defaulted
- SR = Special ranking

=== Finals ===
Semifinals
1	(Croatia) Donna Vekić	3	0^{r}
(Ukraine) Dayana Yastremska	6	2
(Switzerland) Belinda Bencic	6	4	6
6	(Ukraine) Anhelina Kalinina	1	6	1

Final
(Ukraine) Dayana Yastremska	2	3
(Switzerland) Belinda Bencic	6	6

=== Top half ===
First round
1	(Croatia) D Vekić	7^{7}	6^{4}	6
(Russia) V Kudermetova	6^{5}	7^{7}	4
WC	(Russia) P Leykina	1	6	3
(Uzbekistan) N Abduraimova	6	2	6
Q	(Russia) S Lansere	6	6
WC	(Kazakhstan) G Ainitdinova	2	3
(Russia) V Savinykh	6	6
8	(Russia) P Monova	3	2
3	(Belarus) A Sabalenka	6	6
(Serbia) N Stojanović	1	3
(Switzerland) S Vögele	1	3
(Russia) V Kamenskaya	6	6
(Ukraine) D Yastremska	6	6
(Germany) A Zaja	3	4
WC	(Ukraine) V Strakhova	4	3
7	(Belarus) V Lapko	6	6

Second round
1	(Croatia) D Vekić	3	7^{7}	6
(Uzbekistan) N Abduraimova	6	6^{2}	1
Q	(Russia) S Lansere	1	1
(Russia) V Savinykh	6	6
3	(Belarus) A Sabalenka	6	6
(Russia) V Kamenskaya	2	4
(Ukraine) D Yastremska	6	6
7	(Belarus) V Lapko	3	3

Quarterfinals
1	(Croatia) D Vekić	6	6
(Russia) V Savinykh	3	4
3	(Belarus) A Sabalenka	6	5	1
(Ukraine) D Yastremska	3	7	6

Semifinals
1	(Croatia) D Vekić	3	0^{r}
(Ukraine) D Yastremska	6	2

=== Bottom half ===
First round
5	(Russia) I Khromacheva	6^{0}	2
PR	(Russia) V Diatchenko	7^{7}	6
(Switzerland) B Bencic	6	6
Q	(Russia) A Gasanova	0	0
PR	(Belgium) Y Bonaventure	6	7^{7}
Q	(Germany) V Heisen	3	6^{3}
Q	(Russia) E Rybakina	7	2	3
4	(Russia) A Blinkova	5	6	6
6	(Ukraine) A Kalinina	6	6
(Ukraine) O Ianchuk	2	4
(Russia) A Kalinskaya	1	6	6
(Russia) K Lykina	6	4	4
WC	(Russia) M Lazareva	1	1
(Greece) V Grammatikopoulou	6	6
(Turkey) A Aksu	3	4
2	(France) P Parmentier	6	6

Second round
PR	(Russia) V Diatchenko	4	3
(Switzerland) B Bencic	6	6
PR	(Belgium) Y Bonaventure	6	6
4	(Russia) A Blinkova	3	3
6	(Ukraine) A Kalinina	7^{7}	3
(Russia) A Kalinskaya	6^{7}	0^{r}
(Greece) V Grammatikopoulou	6	6
2	(France) P Parmentier	1	0

Quarterfinals
(Switzerland) B Bencic	6	6
PR	(Belgium) Y Bonaventure	1	2
6	(Ukraine) A Kalinina	3	6	6
(Greece) V Grammatikopoulou	6	4	2

Semifinals
(Switzerland) B Bencic	6	4	6
6	(Ukraine) A Kalinina	1	6	1
