= 2017 Neva Cup – Doubles =

Doubles
- 2017 Neva Cup

Final
- Champion: (Russia) Anna Blinkova (Russia) Veronika Kudermetova
- Runner-up: (Switzerland) Belinda Bencic (Slovakia) Michaela Hončová
- Score: 6–3, 6–1

Events
Singles	Doubles
- Neva Cup

Maria Marfutina and Anna Morgina were the defending champions, but Morgina chose to participate at the 2017 Korea Open instead. Marfutina partners Ekaterina Yashina, but they lost in the quarterfinals to Vera Lapko and Valeria Savinykh.

Anna Blinkova and Veronika Kudermetova won the title, defeating Belinda Bencic and Michaela Hončová in the final, 6–3, 6–1.

== Seeds ==
1. (Russia) Anna Kalinskaya / (Russia) Irina Khromacheva (quarterfinals)
2. (Russia) Anna Blinkova / (Russia) Veronika Kudermetova (champions)
3. (Belarus) Vera Lapko / (Russia) Valeria Savinykh (semifinals)
4. (Russia) Yana Sizikova / (Serbia) Nina Stojanović (first round)

== Draw ==
Key

- Q = Qualifier
- WC = Wild card
- LL = Lucky loser
- Alt = Alternate
- ITF = ITF entry
- PR = Protected ranking
- SR = Special ranking
- SE = Special exempt
- JE = Junior exempt
- JR = Junior Accelerator Programme entrant
- CO = College Accelerator Programme entrant
- NG = Next Gen Accelerator Program entrant
- w/o = Walkover
- r = Retired
- d = Defaulted

First round
1	(Russia) A Kalinskaya (Russia) I Khromacheva	6^{4}	6	[10]
(Greece) V Grammatikopoulou (Germany) A Zaja	7^{7}	2	[5]
(Switzerland) B Bencic (Slovakia) M Hončová	6	6
WC	(Russia) E Kazionova (Russia) M Lazareva	4	0
3	(Belarus) V Lapko (Russia) V Savinykh	6	3	[10]
WC	(Russia) D Mishina (Russia) A Vostrikova	0	6	[4]
(Russia) M Marfutina (Russia) E Yashina	6	6
WC	(Russia) D Afanasyeva (Russia) A Tselykovskaya	1	2
(Uzbekistan) N Abduraimova (Russia) A Frolova	6	3	[10]
(Germany) V Heisen (Ukraine) V Strakhova	2	6	[6]
(Russia) K Lykina (United Kingdom) E Webley-Smith	6	7^{7}
4	(Russia) Y Sizikova (Serbia) N Stojanović	1	6^{5}
(Russia) O Doroshina (Russia) P Monova	7^{7}	4	[11]
(Belgium) Y Bonaventure (France) P Parmentier	6^{5}	6	[9]
(Belarus) S Pirazhenka (Russia) A Tarasova	5	1
2	(Russia) A Blinkova (Russia) V Kudermetova	7	6

Quarterfinals
1	(Russia) A Kalinskaya (Russia) I Khromacheva	6	2	[6]
(Switzerland) B Bencic (Slovakia) M Hončová	3	6	[10]
3	(Belarus) V Lapko (Russia) V Savinykh	6	6
(Russia) M Marfutina (Russia) E Yashina	0	1
(Uzbekistan) N Abduraimova (Russia) A Frolova	6	6
(Russia) K Lykina (United Kingdom) E Webley-Smith	0	4
(Russia) O Doroshina (Russia) P Monova	4	2
2	(Russia) A Blinkova (Russia) V Kudermetova	6	6

Semifinals
(Switzerland) B Bencic (Slovakia) M Hončová	2	6	[12]
3	(Belarus) V Lapko (Russia) V Savinykh	6	3	[10]
(Uzbekistan) N Abduraimova (Russia) A Frolova	4	0
2	(Russia) A Blinkova (Russia) V Kudermetova	6	6

Final
(Switzerland) B Bencic (Slovakia) M Hončová	3	1
2	(Russia) A Blinkova (Russia) V Kudermetova	6	6
