= 2026 Abu Dhabi Open =

- Date: 1–7 February
- Edition: 5th
- Category: WTA 500
- Draw: 28S / 16D
- Prize money: $1,206,446
- Surface: Hard / outdoor
- Location: Abu Dhabi, UAE
- Venue: Zayed Sports City International Tennis Centre

Champions

Singles
- (Czech Republic) Sára Bejlek

Doubles
- Ekaterina Alexandrova / (Australia) Maya Joint
- Abu Dhabi Open

The 2026 Mubadala Abu Dhabi Open was a professional women's tennis tournament played on outdoor hard courts. It was the fourth edition of the tournament, and a WTA 500 event on the 2026 WTA Tour. It took place at the Zayed Sports City International Tennis Centre in Abu Dhabi, from 1 February until 7 February 2026.

== Champions ==
=== Singles ===
- (Czech Republic) Sára Bejlek def. Ekaterina Alexandrova, 7–6^{(7–5)}, 6–1

=== Doubles ===
- Ekaterina Alexandrova / (Australia) Maya Joint def. (Slovakia) Tereza Mihalíková / (United Kingdom) Olivia Nicholls 3–6, 7–6^{(7–5)}, [10–8]

== Points and prize money ==
=== Point distribution ===
Event	W	F	SF	QF	R16	R32	Q	Q2	Q1
Singles	500	325	195	108	60	1	25	13	1
Doubles	500	325	195	108	1	—N/a	—N/a	—N/a	—N/a

=== Prize money ===
Event	W	F	SF	QF	Round of 16	Round of 32	Q2	Q1
Singles	$185,500	$114,500	$66,003	$35,000	$18,045	$13,005	$10,500	$6,330
Doubles	$61,540	$37,400	$21,720	$11,150	$6,800	—N/a	—N/a	—N/a
Doubles prize money per team

== Singles main-draw entrants ==
=== Seeds ===
Country	Player	Rank^{1}	Seed
SUI	~~Belinda Bencic~~	10	1
	Ekaterina Alexandrova	11	2
DEN	Clara Tauson	14	3
USA	Emma Navarro	15	4
	Liudmila Samsonova	18	5
CAN	Leylah Fernandez	23	6
LAT	Jeļena Ostapenko	24	7
ESP	Paula Badosa	26	8

- ^{1} Rankings are as of 19 January 2026

=== Other entrants ===
The following players received a wildcard into the singles main draw:

- (United States) Hailey Baptiste
- (Serbia) Teodora Kostović
- (Turkey) Zeynep Sönmez
- ~~(Australia) Ajla Tomljanović~~

The following player received entry using a protected ranking:

- (Brazil) Beatriz Haddad Maia

The following players received entry from the qualifying draw:

- (Czech Republic) Sára Bejlek
- (United Kingdom) Sonay Kartal
- Oksana Selekhmeteva
- (Switzerland) Simona Waltert

The following players received entry as lucky losers:

- (France) Chloé Paquet
- Aliaksandra Sasnovich
- (Mexico) Renata Zarazúa

=== Withdrawals ===
- (Switzerland) Belinda Bencic → replaced by (Mexico) Renata Zarazua (LL)
- (Czech Republic) Barbora Krejčiková → replaced by Aliaksandra Sasnovich (LL)
- (Canada) Victoria Mboko → replaced by (Australia) Daria Kasatkina
- (Belgium) Elise Mertens → replaced by Anastasia Pavlyuchenkova
- (Kazakhstan) Elena Rybakina → replaced by (Spain) Cristina Bucșa
- (Australia) Ajla Tomljanović → replaced by (France) Chloé Paquet (LL)
- (Czech Republic) Markéta Vondroušová → replaced by (United States) Ashlyn Krueger
- (China) Zheng Qinwen → replaced by (Philippines) Alexandra Eala

== Doubles main-draw entrants ==
=== Seeds ===
Country	Player	Country	Player	Rank^{1}	Seed
USA	Asia Muhammad	NZL	Erin Routliffe	28	1
ESP	Cristina Bucșa	CHN	Zhang Shuai	39	2
AUS	Ellen Perez	NED	Demi Schuurs	41	3
SVK	Tereza Mihalíková	GBR	Olivia Nicholls	56	4

- Rankings are as of 19 January 2026

=== Other entrants ===
The following pair received wildcards into the doubles main draw:

- (Serbia) Teodora Kostović / (Ukraine) Dayana Yastremska

The following pairs received entry using a protected ranking:

- (Japan) Shuko Aoyama / Vera Zvonareva
- (Croatia) Darija Jurak Schreiber / (Poland) Katarzyna Piter
- Irina Khromacheva / (Slovenia) Andreja Klepač
