= Neva Cup =

- 2017 Neva Cup

Women's World Tennis Tour
- Event name: Neva Cup (2016–present); Kivennapa Ladies' Cup (2012–2015)
- Location: Saint Petersburg, Russia
- Venue: Tennis Center Dinamo
- Category: ITF Women's Circuit
- Surface: Hard (indoor)
- Draw: 32S/32Q/16D
- Prize money: $100,000
- Website: nevacup.formulatx.com

The Neva Cup (previously known as the Kivennapa Ladies' Cup) is a tournament for professional female tennis players played on indoor hardcourts. The event is classified as a $100,000 ITF Women's Circuit tournament and has been held in Saint Petersburg, Russia, since 2012. In 2016, the tournament moved from the outdoor clay courts of the Children's Tennis Center to the indoor courts of Tennis Center Dinamo.

== Past finals ==
=== Singles ===
Year	Champion	Runner-up	Score
2017	(Switzerland) Belinda Bencic	(Ukraine) Dayana Yastremska	6–2, 6–3
2016	(Russia) Natalia Vikhlyantseva	(Croatia) Donna Vekić	6–1, 6–2
2015	(Russia) Polina Leykina	(Russia) Natalia Vikhlyantseva	6–4, 6–3
2014	(Turkey) Pemra Özgen	(Croatia) Ema Mikulčić	6–1, 7–5
2013	(Russia) Polina Vinogradova	(Georgia (country)) Sofia Shapatava	6–4, 7–6^{(7–2)}
2012	(Belarus) Aliaksandra Sasnovich	(Russia) Polina Vinogradova	1–6, 6–3, 6–0

=== Doubles ===
Year	Champions	Runners-up	Score
2017	(Russia) Anna Blinkova (Russia) Veronika Kudermetova	(Switzerland) Belinda Bencic (Slovakia) Michaela Hončová	6–3, 6–1
2016	(Russia) Maria Marfutina (Russia) Anna Morgina	(Romania) Raluca Olaru (Russia) Alena Tarasova	6–2, 6–3
2015	(Germany) Carolin Daniels (Belarus) Lidziya Marozava	(Russia) Natela Dzalamidze (Russia) Veronika Kudermetova	6–4, 4–6, [10–6]
2014	(Russia) Vitalia Diatchenko (Belarus) Ilona Kremen	(Russia) Natela Dzalamidze (Russia) Anastasia Pivovarova	6–1, 6–3
2013	(Russia) Victoria Kan (Ukraine) Ganna Poznikhirenko	(Poland) Justyna Jegiołka (Thailand) Noppawan Lertcheewakarn	6–2, 6–0
2012	(Russia) Olga Doroshina (Russia) Yuliya Kalabina	(Belarus) Darya Lebesheva (Russia) Julia Valetova	6–0, 6–4
