= Abu Dhabi Open =

WTA Tour
- Event name: Mubadala Abu Dhabi Open
- Tour: WTA Tour
- Founded: 2021
- Location: Abu Dhabi, United Arab Emirates
- Venue: Zayed Sports City International Tennis Centre
- Category: WTA 500
- Surface: Hard - outdoors
- Draw: 28S / 16D
- Prize money: US$ 1,206,446 (2026)

Current champions (2026)
- Singles: (Czech Republic) Sára Bejlek
- Doubles: Ekaterina Alexandrova (Australia) Maya Joint

The Abu Dhabi Open (Arabic: بطولة أبوظبي المفتوحة) is a WTA 500-level professional women's tennis tournament. It takes place on outdoor hardcourts, and was introduced in 2021 to be played in the month of January at the Zayed Sports City International Tennis Centre in the city of Abu Dhabi, United Arab Emirates. The tournament was introduced due to the suspension of all WTA tournaments in China and delay of tournaments in Australia because of COVID-19 pandemic. In 2023, the event was brought back to the tour as a replacement for St. Petersburg Ladies' Trophy due to the suspension of WTA events in Russia because of their invasion of Ukraine. Another reason to host the tournament in Abu Dhabi was the strengthening of the Gulf season with the already established Dubai Tennis Championships and Qatar Total Open.

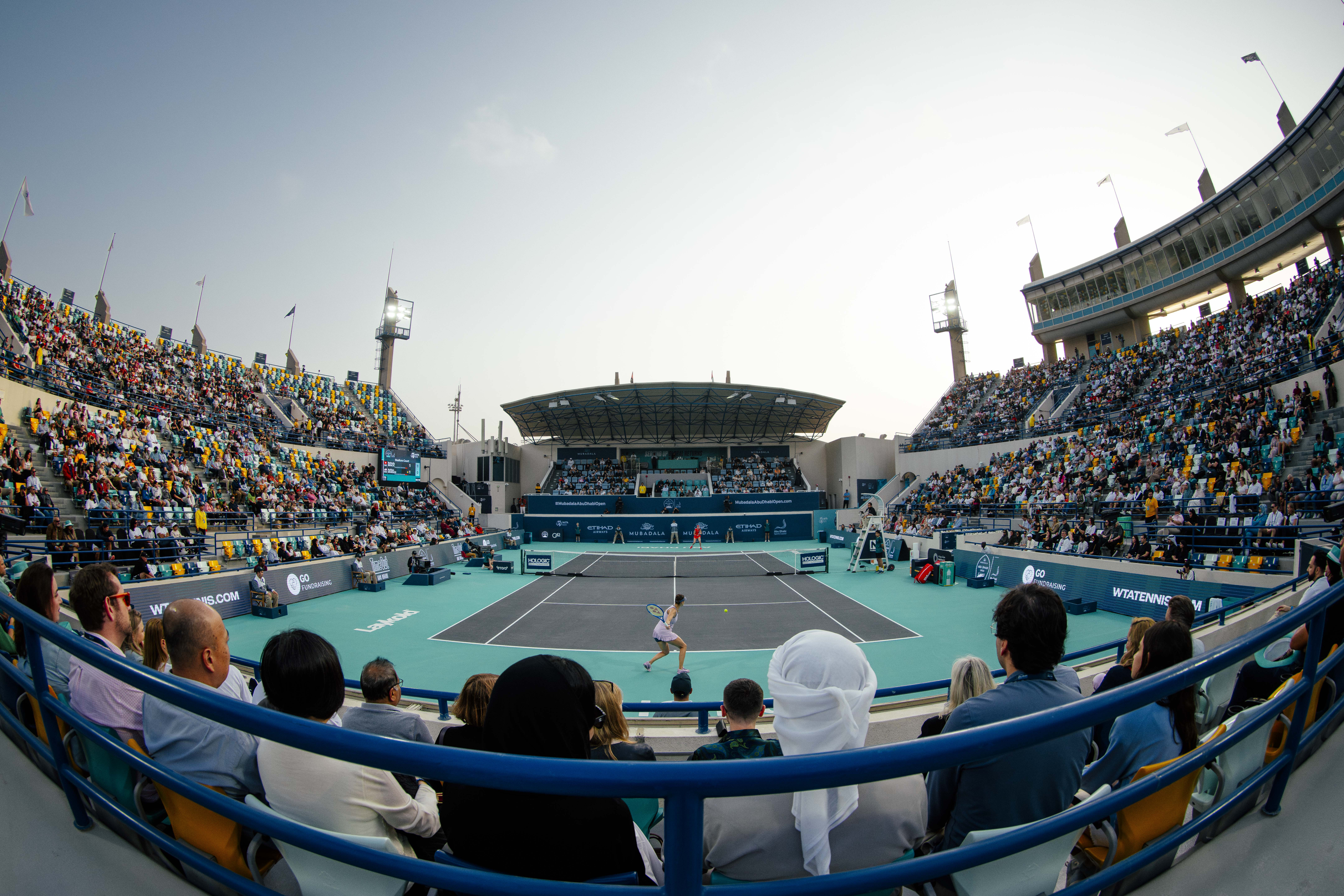
Zayed Sports City International Tennis Centre in 2025

== Finals ==
=== Singles ===
Year	Champion	Runner-up	Score
2021	(Belarus) Aryna Sabalenka	(Russia) Veronika Kudermetova	6–2, 6–2
2022	Not held		
2023	(Switzerland) Belinda Bencic	Liudmila Samsonova	1–6, 7–6^{(10–8)}, 6–4
2024	(Kazakhstan) Elena Rybakina	Daria Kasatkina	6–1, 6–4
2025	(Switzerland) Belinda Bencic (2)	(United States) Ashlyn Krueger	4–6, 6–1, 6–1
2026	(Czech Republic) Sára Bejlek	Ekaterina Alexandrova	7–6^{(7–5)}, 6–1

=== Doubles ===
Year	Champions	Runners-up	Score
2021	(Japan) Shuko Aoyama (Japan) Ena Shibahara	(United States) Hayley Carter (Brazil) Luisa Stefani	7–6^{(7–5)}, 6–4
2022	Not held		
2023	(Brazil) Luisa Stefani (China) Zhang Shuai	(Japan) Shuko Aoyama (Chinese Taipei) Chan Hao-ching	3–6, 6–2, [10–8]
2024	(United States) Sofia Kenin (United States) Bethanie Mattek-Sands	(Czech Republic) Linda Nosková (United Kingdom) Heather Watson	6–4, 7–6^{(7–4)}
2025	(Latvia) Jeļena Ostapenko (Australia) Ellen Perez	(France) Kristina Mladenovic (China) Zhang Shuai	6–2, 6–1
2026	Ekaterina Alexandrova (Australia) Maya Joint	(Slovakia) Tereza Mihalíková (United Kingdom) Olivia Nicholls	3–6, 7–6^{(7–5)}, [10–8]

== See also ==
- Dubai Tennis Championships
- Al Habtoor Tennis Challenge
- World Tennis Championship
