= Maria Marfutina =

Russian tennis player

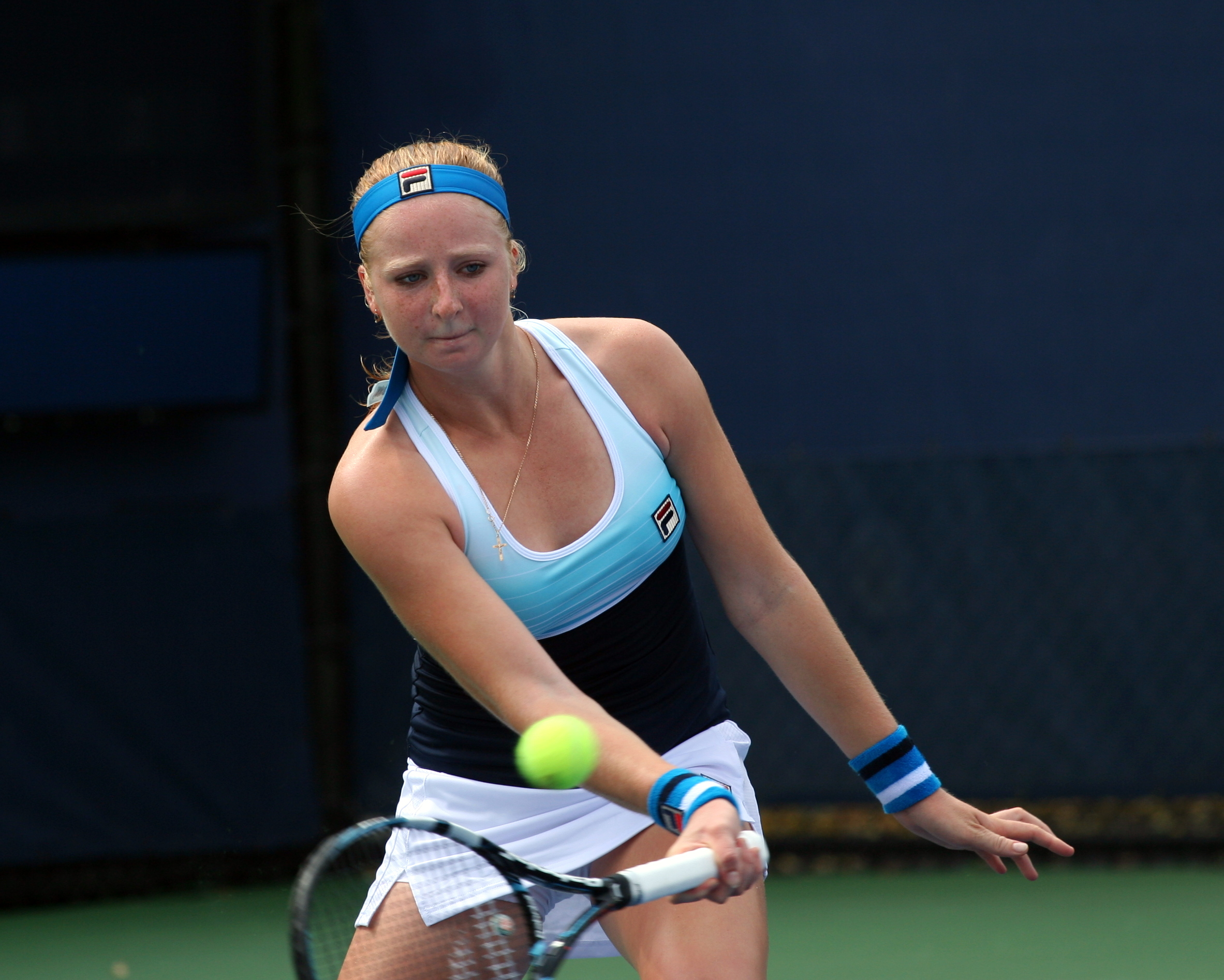
- Marfutina at the 2013 US Open
- Country (sports): Russia
- Residence: Latina, Italy
- Born: 5 June 1997 (age 29) Voronezh, Russia
- Height: 1.75 m (5 ft 9 in)
- Plays: Right (two-handed backhand)
- Prize money: $71,098

Singles
- Career record: 211–121
- Career titles: 7 ITF
- Highest ranking: No. 354 (9 May 2016)

Doubles
- Career record: 110–71
- Career titles: 10 ITF
- Highest ranking: No. 225 (12 December 2016)

Maria Sergeyevna Marfutina (Russian: Мария Сергеевна Марфутина; born 5 June 1997) is a Russian former tennis player.

She has a career-high singles ranking by the WTA of 354, reached on 9 May 2016, and a best doubles ranking of 225, achieved December 2016. In her career, she won seven singles and ten doubles titles on the ITF Circuit.

Marfutina won her biggest title at the 2016 Neva Cup, a $100k tournament, in doubles with Anna Morgina, defeating Raluca Olaru and Alena Tarasova in the final.

== ITF finals ==
=== Singles (7 titles, 2 runner-ups) ===
| Legend $100,000 tournaments $50,000 tournaments $25,000 tournaments $10/15,000 tournaments | Finals by surface Hard (2–0) Clay (5–2) |

| Result | W–L | Date | Tournament | Tier | Surface | Opponent | Score |
|---|---|---|---|---|---|---|---|
| Win | 1–0 | Oct 2013 | ITF Monastir, Tunisia | 10,000 | Hard | (Spain) Arabela Fernández Rabener | 6–2, 6–2 |
| Win | 2–0 | Dec 2013 | ITF Borriol, Spain | 10,000 | Clay | (France) Léolia Jeanjean | 1–6, 7–5, 6–3 |
| Loss | 2–1 | Aug 2015 | ITF Tunis, Tunisia | 10,000 | Clay | (Bosnia and Herzegovina) Jelena Simić | 6–1, 3–6, 4–6 |
| Win | 3–1 | Apr 2016 | ITF Dijon, France | 10,000 | Hard (i) | (Spain) Ainhoa Atucha Gómez | 4–6, 6–2, 6–0 |
| Win | 4–1 | Aug 2016 | ITF Aprilia, Italy | 10,000 | Clay | (Italy) Tatiana Pieri | 6–4, 6–0 |
| Win | 5–1 | Aug 2016 | ITF Sezze, Italy | 10,000 | Clay | (Italy) Bianca Turati | 6–4, 6–0 |
| Win | 6–1 | Aug 2017 | ITF Sezze, Italy | 15,000 | Clay | (Italy) Claudia Giovine | 6–4, 6–4 |
| Win | 7–1 | Jan 2018 | ITF Hammamet, Tunisia | 15,000 | Clay | (Italy) Lucrezia Stefanini | 6–2, 6–1 |
| Loss | 7–2 | Apr 2018 | ITF Hammamet, Tunisia | 15,000 | Clay | (Romania) Ioana Loredana Roșca | 6–3, 3–6, 5–7 |

=== Doubles: 22 (10 titles, 12 runner-ups) ===
| Result | No. | Date | Tier | Tournament | Surface | Partner | Opponents | Score |
|---|---|---|---|---|---|---|---|---|
| Loss | 1. | Oct 2013 | 10k | ITF Monastir, Tunisia | Hard | (Switzerland) Nina Stadler | (Germany) Linda Prenkovic (Netherlands) Bernice van de Velde | 2–6, 4–6 |
| Win | 1. | Jul 2015 | 25k | ITF Stuttgart, Germany | Clay | (Belarus) Iryna Shymanovich | (Czech Republic) Lenka Kunčíková (Czech Republic) Karolína Stuchlá | 6–2, 4–6, [10–8] |
| Win | 2. | Jul 2015 | 10k | ITF Nieuwpoort, Belgium | Clay | (Australia) Alexandra Nancarrow | (Czech Republic) Petra Krejsová (United Kingdom) Francesca Stephenson | 6–0, 2–6, [10–5] |
| Loss | 2. | Sep 2015 | 50k+H | Open de Saint-Malo, France | Clay | (Russia) Natalia Vikhlyantseva | (Slovakia) Kristína Kučová (Latvia) Anastasija Sevastova | 7–6^{(1)}, 3–6, [5–10] |
| Win | 3. | Jan 2016 | 10k | ITF Stuttgart, Germany | Hard (i) | (Russia) Anna Blinkova | (Germany) Laura Schäder (Germany) Anna Zaja | 0–6, 6–4, [10–8] |
| Loss | 3. | Feb 2016 | 25k | AK Ladies Open, Germany | Carpet (i) | (Israel) Deniz Khazaniuk | (Belgium) Ysaline Bonaventure (Switzerland) Xenia Knoll | 1–6, 4–6 |
| Loss | 4. | May 2016 | 25k | ITF Caserta, Italy | Clay | (Ukraine) Oleksandra Korashvili | (United Kingdom) Amanda Carreras (Italy) Alice Savoretti | 7–6^{(9)}, 6–7^{(5)}, [6–10] |
| Win | 4. | Sep 2016 | 100k | Neva Cup St. Petersburg, Russia | Hard (i) | (Russia) Anna Morgina | (Romania) Raluca Olaru (Russia) Alena Tarasova | 6–2, 6–3 |
| Loss | 5. | Mar 2017 | 15k | ITF Hammamet, Tunisia | Clay | (Russia) Margarita Lazareva | (Bulgaria) Isabella Shinikova (Slovakia) Chantal Škamlová | 6–7^{(5)}, 6–4, [8–10] |
| Loss | 6. | Aug 2017 | 15k | ITF Sezze, Italy | Clay | (Italy) Dalila Spiteri | (Italy) Federica di Sarra (Italy) Giorgia Marchetti | 6–3, 3–6, [9–11] |
| Loss | 7. | Jan 2018 | 15k | ITF Hammamet, Tunisia | Clay | (Romania) Ioana Loredana Roșca | (Chinese Taipei) Hsu Chieh-yu (France) Victoria Muntean | 6–3, 5–7, [5–10] |
| Win | 5. | Jan 2018 | 15k | ITF Hammamet, Tunisia | Clay | (Switzerland) Karin Kennel | (Greece) Despina Papamichail (Argentina) Catalina Pella | 7–5, 6–2 |
| Win | 6. | Jan 2018 | 15k | ITF Hammamet, Tunisia | Clay | (Switzerland) Karin Kennel | (Serbia) Natalija Kostić (Bosnia and Herzegovina) Jelena Simić | 6–4, 6–3 |
| Win | 7. | Apr 2018 | 15k | ITF Hammamet, Tunisia | Clay | (Russia) Amina Anshba | (Ukraine) Maryna Chernyshova (Romania) Oana Gavrilă | 4–6, 6–2, [12–10] |
| Win | 8. | Apr 2018 | 15k | ITF Hammamet, Tunisia | Clay | (Romania) Oana Gavrilă | (Japan) Mana Ayukawa (Switzerland) Nina Stadler | 6–2, 6–2 |
| Loss | 8. | May 2018 | 15k | ITF Kaposvar, Hungary | Clay | (Ukraine) Yuliya Lysa | (Hungary) Anna Bondár (Hungary) Panna Udvardy | 6–7^{(6)}, 1–6 |
| Win | 9. | Jun 2018 | 25k | Macha Lake Open, Czech Republic | Clay | (Czech Republic) Anastasia Zarycká | (Czech Republic) Johana Marková (Germany) Sarah-Rebecca Sekulic | 5–7, 6–1, [10–8] |
| Loss | 9. | Jun 2019 | W15 | ITF Tabarka, Tunisia | Hard | (Russia) Anastasiya Poplavska | (Spain) Noelia Bouzó Zanotti (Bolivia) Noelia Zeballos | 0–6, 3–6 |
| Loss | 10. | Nov 2019 | W15 | ITF Ortisei, Italy | Hard (i) | (Italy) Claudia Giovine | (Czech Republic) Klara Hajková (Czech Republic) Aneta Laboutková | 3–6, 6–3, [7–10] |
| Win | 10. | Dec 2019 | W15 | ITF Cairo, Egypt | Clay | (Romania) Oana Georgeta Simion | (Slovenia) Nastja Kolar (Russia) Anna Makhorkina | 3–6, 6–0, [10–2] |
| Loss | 11. | Jan 2020 | W15 | ITF Manacor, Spain | Hard | (Italy) Camilla Rosatello | (Switzerland) Nina Stadler (France) Margot Yerolymos | 6–2, 3–6, [5–10] |
| Loss | 12. | Jan 2020 | W15 | ITF Manacor, Spain | Hard | (Italy) Camilla Rosatello | (Netherlands) Suzan Lamens (Switzerland) Nina Stadler | 6–4, 1–6, [6–10] |
