= 2013 Party Rock Open – Doubles =

Doubles
- 2013 Party Rock Open

Final
- Champions: (Austria) Tamira Paszek (United States) Coco Vandeweghe
- Runners-up: (United States) Denise Muresan (United States) Caitlin Whoriskey
- Score: 6–4, 6–2

Events
Singles	Doubles
← 2012 ·	Party Rock Open	· 2014 →

Anastasia and Arina Rodionova were the defending champions, having won the event in 2012, but Anastasia chose to compete at the 2013 Toray Pan Pacific Open and Arina decided not to participate.

Tamira Paszek and Coco Vandeweghe won the title, defeating Denise Muresan and Caitlin Whoriskey in the final, 6–4, 6–2.

== Seeds ==
1. (United States) Asia Muhammad / (United States) Allie Will (first round)
2. (Austria) Tamira Paszek / (United States) Coco Vandeweghe (champions)
3. (United States) Jacqueline Cako / (United States) Natalie Pluskota (first round)
4. (United States) Chieh-yu Hsu / (United States) Nicole Melichar (first round)

== Draw ==
=== Key ===
- Q = Qualifier
- WC = Wild card
- LL = Lucky loser
- Alt = Alternate
- SE = Special exempt
- PR = Protected ranking
- ITF = ITF entry
- JE = Junior exempt
- w/o = Walkover
- r = Retired
- d = Defaulted
- SR = Special ranking

First round
1	(United States) A Muhammad (United States) A Will	6	4	[5]
(United States) M Brengle (United States) A Kiick	3	6	[10]
(United States) E Harman (United States) E Lumpkin	6	4	[8]
(Australia) S Bengson (Australia) S Jones	1	6	[10]
4	(United States) C-y Hsu (United States) N Melichar	3	3
(United States) D Muresan (United States) C Whoriskey	6	6
(United States) M Harkins (United States) S Marand	7	7
(United States) J Abaza (United States) L Chirico	5	5
(United States) S Crawford (United States) S Vickery	7	6
(United States) A Bhargava (Slovakia) L Wienerová	5	3
(Georgia (country)) A Tatishvili (Croatia) A Tomljanović	6	6
3	(United States) J Cako (United States) N Pluskota	2	3
(Norway) U Eikeri (Japan) M Hibi	2	3
(United States) M Oudin (United States) T Townsend	6	6
WC	(United States) L Embree (United States) M Weatherholt	1	1
2	(Austria) T Paszek (United States) C Vandeweghe	6	6

Quarterfinals
(United States) M Brengle (United States) A Kiick	6	3	[8]
(Australia) S Bengson (Australia) S Jones	3	6	[10]
(United States) D Muresan (United States) C Whoriskey	3	6	[10]
(United States) M Harkins (United States) S Marand	6	4	[8]
(United States) S Crawford (United States) S Vickery	6	4	[10]
(Georgia (country)) A Tatishvili (Croatia) A Tomljanović	4	6	[5]
(United States) M Oudin (United States) T Townsend	6^{4}	6^{4}
2	(Austria) T Paszek (United States) C Vandeweghe	7^{7}	7^{7}

Semifinals
(Australia) S Bengson (Australia) S Jones	1	3
(United States) D Muresan (United States) C Whoriskey	6	6
(United States) S Crawford (United States) S Vickery	6	6^{4}	[8]
2	(Austria) T Paszek (United States) C Vandeweghe	4	7^{7}	[10]

Final
(United States) D Muresan (United States) C Whoriskey	4	2
2	(Austria) T Paszek (United States) C Vandeweghe	6	6
