= 2010 Malaysian Open – Doubles =

Doubles
- 2010 Malaysian Open

Final
- Champions: (Chinese Taipei) Chan Yung-jan (China) Zheng Jie
- Runners-up: (Australia) Anastasia Rodionova (Russia) Arina Rodionova
- Score: 6–7^{(4–7)}, 6–2, [10–7]

Details
- Draw: 16
- Seeds: 4

Events
Singles	Doubles
← 2009 ·	Malaysian Open	· 2011 →

Chan Yung-jan and Zheng Jie won in the final of this tournament. They defeated Anastasia and Arina Rodionova 6–7^{(4–7)}, 6–2, [10–7].

== Seeds ==
1. (Russia) Alisa Kleybanova / (China) Yan Zi (quarterfinals)
2. (Chinese Taipei) Chan Yung-jan / (China) Zheng Jie (champions)
3. (Russia) Alla Kudryavtseva / (Kazakhstan) Galina Voskoboeva (semifinals)
4. (Uzbekistan) Akgul Amanmuradova / (Belarus) Darya Kustova (quarterfinals)

== Draw ==
=== Key ===
- Q = Qualifier
- WC = Wild card
- LL = Lucky loser
- Alt = Alternate
- SE = Special exempt
- PR = Protected ranking
- ITF = ITF entry
- JE = Junior exempt
- w/o = Walkover
- r = Retired
- d = Defaulted
- SR = Special ranking

=== Draws ===
First round
1	(Russia) A Kleybanova (China) Z Yan	6	6
(Hungary) M Czink (South Africa) N Grandin	2	1
(Australia) An Rodionova (Russia) Ar Rodionova	7	4	[10]
(Ukraine) Y Beygelzimer (Ukraine) Y Fedak	6^{4}	6	[6]
4	(Uzbekistan) A Amanmuradova (Belarus) D Kustova	6	7
(Belarus) O Govortsova (Turkey) İ Şenoğlu	3	5
(Chinese Taipei) C-w Chan (Slovakia) M Rybáriková	5	2
(Belarus) E Dzehalevich (Germany) T Malek	7	6
(Croatia) D Jurak (Hungary) K Marosi	6^{5}	2
(United Kingdom) S Borwell (United States) R Kops-Jones	7	6
(Chinese Taipei) K-c Chang (Slovenia) A Klepač	6^{5}	3
3	(Russia) A Kudryavtseva (Kazakhstan) G Voskoboeva	7	6
WC	(Vietnam) TPĐ Huỳnh (Malaysia) J Noordin	4	2
Alt	(Russia) V Diatchenko (South Africa) C Scheepers	6	6
WC	(Indonesia) Y Basuki (Japan) Y Sema	1	6	[3]
2	(Chinese Taipei) Y-j Chan (China) J Zheng	6	3	[10]

Quarterfinals
1	(Russia) A Kleybanova (China) Z Yan	3	6^{5}
(Australia) An Rodionova (Russia) Ar Rodionova	6	7
4	(Uzbekistan) A Amanmuradova (Belarus) D Kustova	5	6^{5}
(Belarus) E Dzehalevich (Germany) T Malek	7	7
(United Kingdom) S Borwell (United States) R Kops-Jones	2	7	[7]
3	(Russia) A Kudryavtseva (Kazakhstan) G Voskoboeva	6	6^{3}	[10]
Alt	(Russia) V Diatchenko (South Africa) C Scheepers	4	4
2	(Chinese Taipei) Y-j Chan (China) J Zheng	6	6

Semifinals
(Australia) An Rodionova (Russia) Ar Rodionova	6	6
(Belarus) E Dzehalevich (Germany) T Malek	1	1
3	(Russia) A Kudryavtseva (Kazakhstan) G Voskoboeva	4	0
2	(Chinese Taipei) Y-j Chan (China) J Zheng	6	6

Finals
(Australia) An Rodionova (Russia) Ar Rodionova	7	2	[7]
2	(Chinese Taipei) Y-j Chan (China) J Zheng	6^{4}	6	[10]
