= 2013 Party Rock Open – Singles =

Singles
- 2013 Party Rock Open

Final
- Champion: (United States) Melanie Oudin
- Runner-up: (United States) Coco Vandeweghe
- Score: 5–7, 6–3, 6–3

Events
Singles	Doubles
← 2012 ·	Party Rock Open	· 2014 →

Lauren Davis was the defending champion, having won the event in 2012, but she decided to participate at the 2013 Ningbo International Women's Tennis Open instead.

Melanie Oudin won the title, defeating Coco Vandeweghe in the final, 5–7, 6–3, 6–3.

== Seeds ==
1. (Croatia) Ajla Tomljanović (quarterfinals)
2. (Portugal) Michelle Larcher de Brito (second round)
3. (Croatia) Mirjana Lučić-Baroni (first round)
4. (United States) Maria Sanchez (second round)
5. (United States) Grace Min (first round)
6. (United States) Coco Vandeweghe (final)
7. (Kazakhstan) Sesil Karatantcheva (first round)
8. (United States) Shelby Rogers (second round)

== Main draw ==
=== Key ===
- Q = Qualifier
- WC = Wild card
- LL = Lucky loser
- Alt = Alternate
- SE = Special exempt
- PR = Protected ranking
- ITF = ITF entry
- JE = Junior exempt
- w/o = Walkover
- r = Retired
- d = Defaulted
- SR = Special ranking

=== Finals ===
Semifinals
(Japan) Mayo Hibi	6	4	5
(United States) Melanie Oudin	3	6	7
(Georgia (country)) Anna Tatishvili	1	3
6	(United States) Coco Vandeweghe	6	6

Final
(United States) Melanie Oudin	5	6	6
6	(United States) Coco Vandeweghe	7	3	3

=== Top half ===
First round
1	(Croatia) A Tomljanović	7	6
Q	(United States) J Cako	5	1
(Switzerland) A Sadiković	6	6
WC	(United States) J Boserup	4	3
JE	(United States) T Townsend	4	6	4
Q	(United States) A Muhammad	6	4	6
(Japan) M Hibi	7	6^{3}	6
7	(Kazakhstan) S Karatantcheva	5	7^{7}	3
3	(Croatia) M Lučić-Baroni	2	6	1
(South Africa) C Simmonds	6	1	6
Q	(United States) S Marand	6	6^{6}	5
(Croatia) T Mrdeža	3	7^{8}	7
(United States) M Oudin	6	6
(Slovenia) P Rampre	0	2
WC	(United States) A Will	2	3
8	(United States) S Rogers	6	6

Second round
1	(Croatia) A Tomljanović	7^{7}	7^{7}
(Switzerland) A Sadiković	6^{5}	6^{5}
Q	(United States) A Muhammad	4	6	2
(Japan) M Hibi	6	4	6
(South Africa) C Simmonds	4	6	6
(Croatia) T Mrdeža	6	1	3
(United States) M Oudin	4	4
8	(United States) S Rogers	6	1^{r}

Quarterfinals
1	(Croatia) A Tomljanović	2	6^{4}
(Japan) M Hibi	6	7^{7}
(South Africa) C Simmonds	2	2
(United States) M Oudin	6	6

Semifinals
(Japan) M Hibi	6	4	5
(United States) M Oudin	3	6	7

=== Bottom half ===
First round
5	(United States) G Min	1	6^{7}
WC	(United States) A Stevenson	6	7^{9}
(Australia) S Jones	2	2
Q	(United States) A Kiick	6	6
(Georgia (country)) A Tatishvili	7	6
(United States) S Crawford	5	1
(United States) C-y Hsu	0	7	2
4	(United States) M Sanchez	6	5	6
6	(United States) C Vandeweghe	6	7^{7}
(Greece) E Daniilidou	3	6^{2}
(Venezuela) A Pérez	6^{8}	6^{7}
(Austria) T Paszek	7^{10}	7^{9}
(United States) S Vickery	1	3
(United States) M Brengle	6	6
WC	(United States) E Lumpkin	2	3
2	(Portugal) M Larcher de Brito	6	6

Second round
WC	(United States) A Stevenson	1	0^{r}
Q	(United States) A Kiick	6	1
(Georgia (country)) A Tatishvili	7^{7}	2	6
4	(United States) M Sanchez	6^{1}	6	3
6	(United States) C Vandeweghe	6	6
(Austria) T Paszek	4	2
(United States) M Brengle	4	6	6
2	(Portugal) M Larcher de Brito	6	2	3

Quarterfinals
Q	(United States) A Kiick	7	0	0
(Georgia (country)) A Tatishvili	5	6	6
6	(United States) C Vandeweghe	6	6
(United States) M Brengle	3	4

Semifinals
(Georgia (country)) A Tatishvili	1	3
6	(United States) C Vandeweghe	6	6
