= 2010 Malaysian Open – Singles =

Singles
- 2010 Malaysian Open

Final
- Champion: (Russia) Alisa Kleybanova
- Runner-up: (Russia) Elena Dementieva
- Score: 6–3, 6–2

Details
- Draw: 32
- Seeds: 8

Events
Singles	Doubles
- Malaysian Open

Fourth-seeded Alisa Kleybanova won the singles title at the 2010 Malaysian Open tennis tournament after a win in the final 6–3, 6–2, against first-seeded Elena Dementieva.

== Seeds ==
1. (Russia) Elena Dementieva (final)
2. (China) Li Na (first round)
3. (China) Zheng Jie (second round)
4. (Russia) Alisa Kleybanova (champion)
5. (Hungary) Melinda Czink (first round)
6. (Austria) Sybille Bammer (semifinals)
7. (Slovakia) Magdaléna Rybáriková (quarterfinals)
8. (Belarus) Olga Govortsova (first round)

== Draw ==
Key

- Q = Qualifier
- WC = Wild card
- LL = Lucky loser
- Alt = Alternate
- ITF = ITF entry
- PR = Protected ranking
- SR = Special ranking
- SE = Special exempt
- JE = Junior exempt
- JR = Junior Accelerator Programme entrant
- CO = College Accelerator Programme entrant
- NG = Next Gen Accelerator Program entrant
- w/o = Walkover
- r = Retired
- d = Defaulted

=== Finals ===
Semifinals
1	(Russia) Elena Dementieva	6	6
6	(Austria) Sybille Bammer	1	3
4	(Russia) Alisa Kleybanova	6	6
(Japan) Ayumi Morita	4	1

Final
1	(Russia) Elena Dementieva	3	2
4	(Russia) Alisa Kleybanova	6	6

=== Top half ===
First round
1	(Russia) E Dementieva	6	6
(Russia) E Bychkova	2	1
(Russia) V Diatchenko	3	1
(Serbia) B Jovanovski	6	6
WC	(Thailand) N Lertcheewakarn	6	6
Q	(Russia) K Pervak	1	4
(Thailand) T Tanasugarn	5	3
7	(Slovakia) M Rybáriková	7	6
3	(China) J Zheng	6	6
Q	(Russia) E Bovina	4	3
(Chinese Taipei) K-c Chang	7	7
LL	(China) S Zhang	6^{4}	5
Q	(Japan) Y Sema	3	2
(Uzbekistan) A Amanmuradova	6	6
Q	(Greece) A Gerasimou	5	4
6	(Austria) S Bammer	7	6

Second round
1	(Russia) E Dementieva	6	6
(Serbia) B Jovanovski	2	3
WC	(Thailand) N Lertcheewakarn	4	5
7	(Slovakia) M Rybáriková	6	7
3	(China) J Zheng	2	3
(Chinese Taipei) K-c Chang	6	6
(Uzbekistan) A Amanmuradova	3	0
6	(Austria) S Bammer	6	6

Quarterfinals
1	(Russia) E Dementieva	6	6
7	(Slovakia) M Rybáriková	0	3
(Chinese Taipei) K-c Chang	6	3	3
6	(Austria) S Bammer	3	6	6

Semifinals
1	(Russia) E Dementieva	6	6
6	(Austria) S Bammer	1	3

=== Bottom half ===
First round
8	(Belarus) O Govortsova	4	6	5
(Australia) A Rodionova	6	0	7
(Belarus) D Kustova	6	4	2
(Russia) E Ivanova	4	6	6
(Chinese Taipei) Y-j Chan	0	0	r
(Russia) A Kudryavtseva	6	3
WC	(Australia) A Molik	1	4
4	(Russia) A Kleybanova	6	6
5	(Hungary) M Czink	6	5	6^{5}
WC	(China) Z Yan	3	7	7
(Japan) A Morita	7	6
(Kazakhstan) G Voskoboeva	5	4
(Switzerland) S Vögele	2	1
(South Africa) C Scheepers	6	6
(Germany) T Malek	6	5	6
2	(China) N Li	1	7	2

Second round
(Australia) A Rodionova	6	6
(Russia) E Ivanova	2	2
(Russia) A Kudryavtseva	7	3	4
4	(Russia) A Kleybanova	6^{4}	6	6
WC	(China) Z Yan	2	1
(Japan) A Morita	6	6
(South Africa) C Scheepers	4	6	6
(Germany) T Malek	6	2	3

Quarterfinals
(Australia) A Rodionova	6	3	4
4	(Russia) A Kleybanova	4	6	6
(Japan) A Morita	6	7
(South Africa) C Scheepers	3	5

Semifinals
4	(Russia) A Kleybanova	6	6
(Japan) A Morita	4	1

== Qualifying ==
=== Seeds ===
1. (Russia) Ksenia Pervak (qualified)
2. (Serbia) Bojana Jovanovski (moved to main draw)
3. (Australia) Olivia Rogowska (second round)
4. (Australia) Sophie Ferguson (second round)
5. (China) Zhang Shuai (qualifying competition, lucky loser)
6. (Japan) Yurika Sema (qualified)
7. (Russia) Elena Chalova (first round)
8. (Belarus) Ekaterina Dzehalevich (second round)
9. (Ukraine) Yuliana Fedak (first round)

=== Qualifiers ===
1. (Russia) Ksenia Pervak
2. (Greece) Anna Gerasimou
3. (Japan) Yurika Sema
4. (Russia) Elena Bovina

=== Lucky loser ===
1. (China) Zhang Shuai

=== Draw ===
==== First qualifier ====
First round
(Hungary) Katalin Marosi	3	3
(Russia) Arina Rodionova	6	6
(Malaysia) Jawairiah Noordin	2	2
(Kyrgyzstan) Ksenia Palkina	6	6
(Japan) Tomoko Yonemura	5	1
8	(Belarus) Ekaterina Dzehalevich	7	6

Second round
1	(Russia) Ksenia Pervak	6	6
(Russia) Arina Rodionova	3	3
(Kyrgyzstan) Ksenia Palkina	6	6^{6}	6
8	(Belarus) Ekaterina Dzehalevich	4	7	3

Qualifying competition
1	(Russia) Ksenia Pervak	6	6
(Kyrgyzstan) Ksenia Palkina	1	1

==== Second qualifier ====
First round
9	(Ukraine) Yuliana Fedak	6	3	5
(Greece) Anna Gerasimou	2	6	7
WC	(United States) Raquel Kops-Jones	3	2
(China) Han Xinyun	6	6
(Japan) Chiaki Okadaue	7	6
(Ukraine) Yuliya Beygelzimer	6^{5}	4
(Ukraine) Veronika Kapshay	4	3
5	(China) Zhang Shuai	6	6

Second round
(Greece) Anna Gerasimou	6	6
(China) Han Xinyun	1	2
(Japan) Chiaki Okadaue	4	1
5	(China) Zhang Shuai	6	6

Qualifying competition
(Greece) Anna Gerasimou	6	6
5	(China) Zhang Shuai	4	3

==== Third qualifier ====
First round
WC	(Malaysia) Sharifah Syafeenaz Syed Azmir	0	0
(China) Zhou Yimiao	6	6
WC	(Vietnam) Huynh Phuong Dai Trang	1	4
(Slovenia) Andreja Klepač	6	6
WC	(United Kingdom) Sarah Borwell	5	2
6	(Japan) Yurika Sema	7	6

Second round
3	(Australia) Olivia Rogowska	2	1
(China) Zhou Yimiao	6	6
(Slovenia) Andreja Klepač	2	2
6	(Japan) Yurika Sema	6	6

Qualifying competition
(China) Zhou Yimiao	2	6	4
6	(Japan) Yurika Sema	6	3	6

==== Fourth qualifier ====
First round
4	(Australia) Sophie Ferguson	6	6
(Croatia) Darija Jurak	1	2
(South Africa) Natalie Grandin	6	7
(Chinese Taipei) Chen Yi	2	6^{3}
WC	(Malaysia) Neesha Thirumalaichelvam	0	1
(India) Rushmi Chakravarthi	6	6
(Russia) Elena Bovina	6	6^{4}	6
7	(Russia) Elena Chalova	1	7	3

Second round
4	(Australia) Sophie Ferguson	6^{2}	1
(South Africa) Natalie Grandin	7	6
(India) Rushmi Chakravarthi	3	2
(Russia) Elena Bovina	6	6

Qualifying competition
(South Africa) Natalie Grandin	7	3	5
(Russia) Elena Bovina	5	6	7
