= 2010 Malaysian Open =

- Date: 22–28 February
- Edition: 1st
- Category: International tournaments
- Draw: 32S / 16D
- Prize money: $220,000
- Surface: Hard / outdoor
- Location: Kuala Lumpur, Malaysia

Champions

Singles
- (Russia) Alisa Kleybanova

Doubles
- (Chinese Taipei) Chan Yung-jan / (China) Zheng Jie
- Malaysian Open

The 2010 Golden Horses Health Sanctuary Malaysian Open was a women's tennis tournament played on outdoor hard courts. It was the inaugural edition of the Malaysian Open and was an International tournament on the WTA Tour. The event took place from 22 February to 28 February at the Bukit Kiara Equestrian and Country Resort.

The event was headlined by the participation of world No. 7 and Olympic champion Elena Dementieva in the main draw. Other participants include recent Australian Open semi-finalists, World No. 10 Li Na and World No. 20 Zheng Jie and last years Wimbledon quarter-finalist and Family Circle Cup champion, Sabine Lisicki. Fourth-seeded Alisa Kleybanova won the singles title.

== Finals ==
=== Singles ===
(Russia) Alisa Kleybanova defeated (Russia) Elena Dementieva 6–3, 6–2

- It was Kleybanova's 1st career singles title.

=== Doubles ===
(Chinese Taipei) Chan Yung-jan / (China) Zheng Jie defeated (Australia) Anastasia Rodionova / (Russia) Arina Rodionova 6–7^{(4–7)}, 6–2, [10–7]

== Entrants ==
=== Seeds ===
| Country | Player | Ranking^{1} | Seeding |
|---|---|---|---|
| RUS | Elena Dementieva | 7 | 1 |
| CHN | Li Na | 10 | 2 |
| CHN | Zheng Jie | 20 | 3 |
| RUS | Alisa Kleybanova | 31 | 4 |
| HUN | Melinda Czink | 44 | 5 |
| AUT | Sybille Bammer | 50 | 6 |
| SVK | Magdaléna Rybáriková | 53 | 7 |
| BLR | Olga Govortsova | 56 | 8 |

- ^{1} Rankings as of February 15, 2010.

=== Other entrants ===
The following players received wildcards into the main draw:

- (Thailand) Noppawan Lertcheewakarn
- (Australia) Alicia Molik
- (China) Yan Zi

The following players received entry from the qualifying draw:

- (Russia) Elena Bovina
- (Greece) Anna Gerasimou
- (Russia) Ksenia Pervak
- (Japan) Yurika Sema
