= 2012 Party Rock Open =

- Date: September 24–30
- Edition: 4th
- Location: Las Vegas, United States

Champions

Singles
- (United States) Lauren Davis

Doubles
- (Australia) Anastasia Rodionova / (Russia) Arina Rodionova
← 2011 ·	Party Rock Open	· 2013 →

The 2012 Party Rock Open was a professional tennis tournament played on hard courts. It is the fourth edition of the tournament which is part of the 2012 ITF Women's Circuit. It took place in Las Vegas, United States on September 24–30, 2012.

== WTA entrants ==
=== Seeds ===
Country	Player	Rank^{1}	Seed
ROU	Edina Gallovits-Hall	114	1
USA	Lauren Davis	115	2
POR	Michelle Larcher de Brito	120	3
AUS	Anastasia Rodionova	130	4
USA	Irina Falconi	150	5
USA	Alison Riske	151	6
USA	Mallory Burdette	160	7
CAN	Heidi El Tabakh	161	8

- ^{1} Rankings are as of September 17, 2012.

=== Other entrants ===
The following players received wildcards into the singles main draw:

- (United States) Samantha Crawford
- (United States) Chelsey Gullickson
- (United States) Asia Muhammad
- (United States) Allie Will

The following players received entry from the qualifying draw:

- (Canada) Gabriela Dabrowski
- (United States) Jennifer Elie
- (Venezuela) Adriana Pérez
- (Russia) Arina Rodionova

== Champions ==
=== Singles ===
- (United States) Lauren Davis def. (United States) Shelby Rogers, 6–7^{(5–7)}, 6–2, 6–2

=== Doubles ===
- (Australia) Anastasia Rodionova / (Russia) Arina Rodionova def. (Russia) Elena Bovina / (Romania) Edina Gallovits-Hall, 6–2, 2–6, [10–6]
