= 2013 Party Rock Open =

- Date: September 23–29
- Edition: 5th
- Prize money: $50,000
- Surface: Hard
- Location: Las Vegas, United States

Champions

Singles
- (United States) Melanie Oudin

Doubles
- (Austria) Tamira Paszek / (United States) Coco Vandeweghe
← 2012 ·	Party Rock Open	· 2014 →

The 2013 Party Rock Open was a professional tennis tournament played on outdoor hard courts. It was the fifth edition of the tournament which was part of the 2013 ITF Women's Circuit, offering a total of $50,000 in prize money. It took place in Las Vegas, United States, on September 23–29, 2013.

== WTA entrants ==
=== Seeds ===
Country	Player	Rank^{1}	Seed
CRO	Ajla Tomljanović	88	1
POR	Michelle Larcher de Brito	100	2
CRO	Mirjana Lučić-Baroni	108	3
USA	Maria Sanchez	115	4
USA	Grace Min	128	5
USA	Coco Vandeweghe	129	6
KAZ	Sesil Karatantcheva	132	7
USA	Shelby Rogers	135	8

- ^{1} Rankings as of September 16, 2013

=== Other entrants ===
The following players received wildcards into the singles main draw:

- (United States) Julia Boserup
- (United States) Elizabeth Lumpkin
- (United States) Alexandra Stevenson
- (United States) Allie Will

The following players received entry from the qualifying draw:

- (United States) Jacqueline Cako
- (United States) Allie Kiick
- (United States) Sanaz Marand
- (United States) Asia Muhammad

The following player received entry by a Junior Exempt:

- (United States) Taylor Townsend

== Champions ==
=== Singles ===
- (United States) Melanie Oudin def. (United States) Coco Vandeweghe 5–7, 6–3, 6–3

=== Doubles ===
- (Austria) Tamira Paszek / (United States) Coco Vandeweghe def. (United States) Denise Muresan / (United States) Caitlin Whoriskey 6–4, 6–2
