= 2012 Party Rock Open – Singles =

Singles
- 2012 Party Rock Open

Final
- Champion: (United States) Lauren Davis
- Runner-up: (United States) Shelby Rogers
- Score: 6–7^{(5–7)}, 6–2, 6–2

Events
Singles	Doubles
- Party Rock Open

Romina Oprandi was the defending champion, but she decided to compete in Tokyo that week.

Lauren Davis won the title, defeating Shelby Rogers in the final, 6–7^{(5–7)}, 6–2, 6–2.

== Seeds ==
1. (Romania) Edina Gallovits-Hall (first round)
2. (United States) Lauren Davis (champion)
3. (Portugal) Michelle Larcher de Brito (first round)
4. (Australia) Anastasia Rodionova (semifinals)
5. (United States) Irina Falconi (first round)
6. (United States) Alison Riske (first round)
7. (United States) Mallory Burdette (quarterfinals)
8. (Canada) Heidi El Tabakh (quarterfinals)

== Main draw ==
Key

- Q = Qualifier
- WC = Wild card
- LL = Lucky loser
- Alt = Alternate
- ITF = ITF entry
- PR = Protected ranking
- SR = Special ranking
- SE = Special exempt
- JE = Junior exempt
- JR = Junior Accelerator Programme entrant
- CO = College Accelerator Programme entrant
- NG = Next Gen Accelerator Program entrant
- w/o = Walkover
- r = Retired
- d = Defaulted

=== Finals ===
Semifinals
Q	(Venezuela) Adriana Pérez	6^{5}	2
(United States) Shelby Rogers	7^{7}	6
4	(Australia) Anastasia Rodionova	4	7^{8}	4
2	(United States) Lauren Davis	6	6^{6}	6

Final
(United States) Shelby Rogers	7^{7}	2	2
2	(United States) Lauren Davis	6^{5}	6	6

=== Top half ===
First round
1	(Romania) E Gallovits-Hall	1	1
(Slovenia) P Rampre	6	6
WC	(United States) C Gullickson	2^{r}
(United States) J Pegula	5
(Paraguay) V Cepede Royg	6	5	4
Q	(Venezuela) A Pérez	4	7	6
(Croatia) M Abramović	7	6
5	(United States) I Falconi	5	1
3	(Portugal) M Larcher de Brito	4	0
(United States) C Scholl	6	6
(Russia) E Bovina	1	6	7
(United States) J Boserup	6	4	5
(United States) G Min	4	0
(United States) S Rogers	6	6
(Canada) S Dubois	6	1	7^{7}
6	(United States) A Riske	3	6	6^{3}

Second round
(Slovenia) P Rampre	1	3
(United States) J Pegula	6	6
Q	(Venezuela) A Pérez	6	6
(Croatia) M Abramović	4	4
(United States) C Scholl	7	0	6^{2}
(Russia) E Bovina	5	6	7^{7}
(United States) S Rogers	7^{7}	6
(Canada) S Dubois	6^{3}	4

Quarterfinals
(United States) J Pegula	6	5	6^{5}
Q	(Venezuela) A Pérez	2	7	7^{7}
(Russia) E Bovina	3	4
(United States) S Rogers	6	6

Semifinals
Q	(Venezuela) A Pérez	6^{5}	2
(United States) S Rogers	7^{7}	6

=== Bottom half ===
First round
8	(Canada) H El Tabakh	3	6	6
(United States) A Weinhold	6	3	2
(Canada) M-È Pelletier	6	6^{4}	6
Q	(United States) J Elie	3	7^{7}	2
Q	(Russia) Ar Rodionova	3	6	7^{7}
(Russia) K Lykina	6	1	6^{2}
WC	(United States) S Crawford	4	3
4	(Australia) An Rodionova	6	6
7	(United States) M Burdette	7	6
(Switzerland) A Sadiković	5	1
WC	(United States) A Will	1	7^{7}	3
(United States) M Brengle	6	6^{5}	6
Q	(Canada) G Dabrowski	3	7	2
WC	(United States) A Muhammed	6	5	6
(United States) M Sanchez	6	3	3
2	(United States) L Davis	2	6	6

Second round
8	(Canada) H El Tabakh	6	5	6
(Canada) M-È Pelletier	4	7	2
Q	(Russia) Ar Rodionova	2^{r}
4	(Australia) An Rodionova	5
7	(United States) M Burdette	6	6
(United States) M Brengle	3	3
WC	(United States) A Muhammed	3	3
2	(United States) L Davis	6	6

Quarterfinals
8	(Canada) H El Tabakh	3	7	3
4	(Australia) An Rodionova	6	5	6
7	(United States) M Burdette	3	5
2	(United States) L Davis	6	7

Semifinals
4	(Australia) An Rodionova	4	7^{8}	4
2	(United States) L Davis	6	6^{6}	6
