= 2012 Party Rock Open – Doubles =

Doubles
- 2012 Party Rock Open

Final
- Champions: (Australia) Anastasia Rodionova (Russia) Arina Rodionova
- Runners-up: (Russia) Elena Bovina (Romania) Edina Gallovits-Hall
- Score: 6–2, 2–6, [10–6]

Events
| Singles | Doubles |
- Party Rock Open

Alexa Glatch and Mashona Washington were the defending champions, but both players chose not to participate.

Anastasia Rodionova and Arina Rodionova won the title, defeating Elena Bovina and Edina Gallovits-Hall in the final, 6–2, 2–6, [10–6].

== Seeds ==
1. (Australia) Anastasia Rodionova / (Russia) Arina Rodionova (champions)
2. (United States) Irina Falconi / (United States) Maria Sanchez (first round)
3. (United States) Jessica Pegula / (Canada) Marie-Ève Pelletier (semifinals)
4. (Russia) Elena Bovina / (Romania) Edina Gallovits-Hall (final)

== Draw ==
Key

- Q = Qualifier
- WC = Wild card
- LL = Lucky loser
- Alt = Alternate
- ITF = ITF entry
- PR = Protected ranking
- SR = Special ranking
- SE = Special exempt
- JE = Junior exempt
- JR = Junior Accelerator Programme entrant
- CO = College Accelerator Programme entrant
- NG = Next Gen Accelerator Program entrant
- w/o = Walkover
- r = Retired
- d = Defaulted

First round
1 | (Australia) An Rodionova (Russia) Ar Rodionova | 6 | 6
WC | (United States) A Riske (United States) A Will | 1 | 4
(Croatia) M Abramović (Switzerland) A Sadiković | 6^{8} | 6 | [10]
WC | (United States) M Burdette (United States) L Embree | 7^{10} | 3 | [8]
3 | (United States) J Pegula (Canada) M-È Pelletier | 6 | 6
(Paraguay) V Cepede Royg (Venezuela) A Pérez | 3 | 3
(United States) L Litvak (United States) N Melichar | 7 | 6
WC | (United States) R Ellison (United States) S Ellison | 5 | 4
(United States) S Rogers (United States) A Weinhold | 6 | 4 | [10]
(Canada) G Dabrowski (United States) A Muhammed | 3 | 6 | [6]
(United States) J Elie (United States) E Lumpkin | 2 | 1
4 | (Russia) E Bovina (Romania) E Gallovits-Hall | 6 | 6
(Russia) K Lykina (Japan) M Miyamura | 3 | 3
(Austria) N Rottmann (Slovakia) L Wienerová | 6 | 6
(United States) M Harkins (United States) C-Y Hsu | 3 | 7^{7} | [10]
2 | (United States) I Falconi (United States) M Sanchez | 6 | 6^{4} | [4]

Quarterfinals
1 | (Australia) An Rodionova (Russia) Ar Rodionova | 6 | 7^{7}
(Croatia) M Abramović (Switzerland) A Sadiković | 3 | 6^{2}
3 | (United States) J Pegula (Canada) M-È Pelletier | 6 | 6
(United States) L Litvak (United States) N Melichar | 4 | 1
(United States) S Rogers (United States) A Weinhold | 3 | 5
4 | (Russia) E Bovina (Romania) E Gallovits-Hall | 6 | 7
(Austria) N Rottmann (Slovakia) L Wienerová | 3 | 6 | [10]
(United States) M Harkins (United States) C-Y Hsu | 6 | 4 | [3]

Semifinals
1 | (Australia) An Rodionova (Russia) Ar Rodionova | 6 | 6
3 | (United States) J Pegula (Canada) M-È Pelletier | 2 | 4
4 | (Russia) E Bovina (Romania) E Gallovits-Hall | 6 | 6
(Austria) N Rottmann (Slovakia) L Wienerová | 3 | 2

Finals
1 | (Australia) An Rodionova (Russia) Ar Rodionova | 6 | 2 | [10]
4 | (Russia) E Bovina (Romania) E Gallovits-Hall | 2 | 6 | [6]
