= Alisa Kleybanova =

Russian tennis player (born 1989)

Alisa Kleybanova Алиса Клейбанова
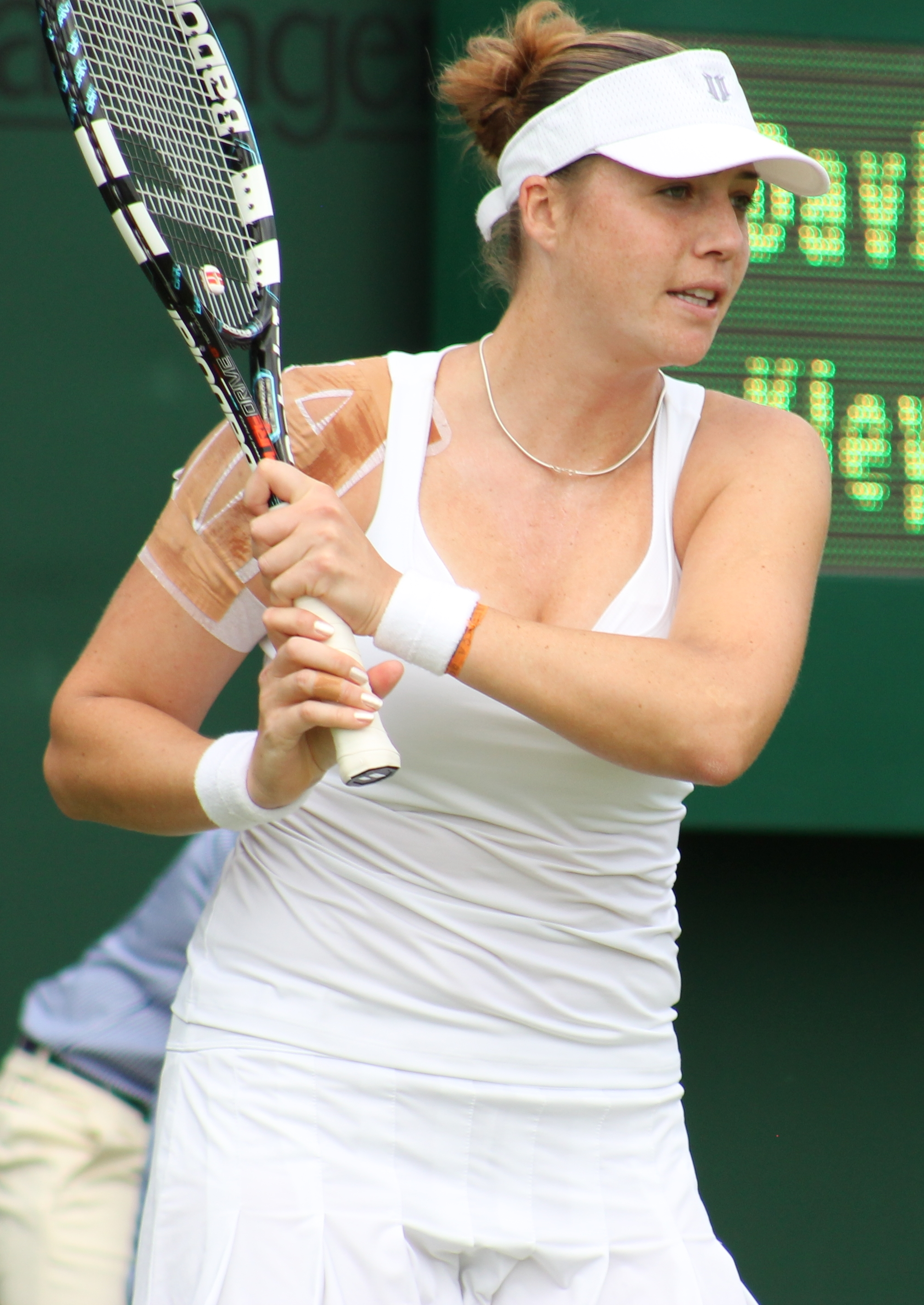
- Kleybanova at the 2014 Wimbledon Championships
- Country (sports): Russia
- Born: 15 July 1989 (age 37) Moscow, Soviet Union
- Height: 1.81 m (5 ft 11 in)
- Turned pro: 2003
- Plays: Right-handed (two-handed backhand)
- Coach: Julian Vespan
- Prize money: $2,492,031

Singles
- Career record: 307–150
- Career titles: 2
- Highest ranking: No. 20 (21 February 2011)

Grand Slam singles results
- Australian Open: 4R (2009)
- French Open: 3R (2010)
- Wimbledon: 4R (2008)
- US Open: 2R (2008, 2010, 2013)

Doubles
- Career record: 150–87
- Career titles: 5
- Highest ranking: No. 10 (1 February 2010)

Grand Slam doubles results
- Australian Open: QF (2010)
- French Open: 3R (2014)
- Wimbledon: QF (2009)
- US Open: SF (2009)

Team competitions
- Fed Cup: 3–2
Medal record
Universiade
Gold medal – first place	2007 Bangkok	Singles
Silver medal – second place	2007 Bangkok	Mixed

Alisa Mikhailovna Kleybanova (Алиса Михайловна Клейбанова, born 15 July 1989) is a Russian former tennis player. Her career-high singles ranking is world No. 20, achieved in February 2011. In her career, she won two singles titles and five doubles titles on the WTA Tour.

== Career ==
Kleybanova made her senior tennis début in 2003 aged 14, and won the first ITF tournament she entered.

To date her career-best achievements have been reaching the fourth round at two Grand Slam tournaments at Wimbledon and Australian Open as a direct entrant, two WTA Tour Tier-II quarterfinals (Antwerp, 2008; Eastbourne, 2008) as a qualifier. Additionally, she has reached one Tier I third round (Miami, 2008) as a qualifier, and one Tier IV quarterfinal (Fes, 2008) as a direct entrant.

At the higher levels of the ITF Women's Circuit, she has reached one $100k quarterfinal, two $75k quarterfinals, one $50k final and one $50k semifinal. In addition, at the lower levels, she has won seven $25k titles and one $10k title outright, and has reached two further $25k finals and another three $25k semifinals.

She has also experienced success in the juniors; she won the 2003 Wimbledon Championships girls' doubles with Sania Mirza, aged 13. Three years later, she won the same competition with fellow rising Russian star Anastasia Pavlyuchenkova. She also won the girls' doubles at the 2005 US Open with Czech Nikola Fraňková.

=== 2003–2004 ===
In August 2003, aged 14 years and one month, Kleybanova entered qualifying for her first $10k event at Mollerusa, Spain, and came through all three qualifying rounds into the main draw without dropping a set, then proceeded to progress through to the final and win the title on her first attempt, having ceded just one set in the whole tournament in her second-round match.

She played six tournaments on the tour and ranked No. 364 by the end of 2004.

=== 2005 ===
In March, the Russian teenager was favoured with a wildcard into the main draw at Indian Wells for the second year running, but this time she lost in the first round to world No. 95, Anne Kremer of Luxembourg.

Her ranking having plunged to 520 following her failure to defend her points picked up at Indian Wells a year earlier, she was wildcarded into the qualifying draw instead of the main draw for the Tier-I event at Miami that immediately followed, and at first defeated world No. 91, Séverine Beltrame (nowadays known as Séverine Brémond), but then lost in the second round of qualifying to German Julia Schruff.

By the time she next competed in July, she had lost nearly all her ranking points and plummeted to world No. 730. She came through qualifying draw at a $25k tournament held at Felixstowe, England, but lost in the second round of the main draw to world No. 228, Jarmila Gajdošová.

In August, ranked 618th, she entered qualifying for two successive $25k events in China – the first at Wuxi, where she qualified but lost in the second round of the main draw to world No. 325, Miho Saeki, and the second at Nanjing, where in the first round of qualifying she had to withdraw with the score level at one set all against a little-known Chinese player.

Travelling to Moscow at the end of the month, she entered qualifying for a further $25k event there, and enjoyed not only by far her most successful performance of the year but also the best of her career, as she came through three rounds of qualifying and then won the entire tournament. Her vanquished opponents included Galyna Kosyk of Ukraine, whom she defeated in the second round of qualifying, Italians Giulia Gabba, Sara Errani and Karin Knapp, all of whom she defeated in straight sets, Margalita Chakhnashvili of Georgia, whom she beat in the semifinals, and fellow-Russian Vasilisa Bardina, whom she ousted in the final 6–2, 6–2.

Wildcarded into the qualifying draw for the annual Tier-I fixture at Moscow in early October, her ranking having leapt back up to world No. 384, Kleybanova double-bagelled American former top 40 star Alexandra Stevenson in the first round of qualifying, but then lost a close three-set match to Bulgarian world No. 41, Sesil Karatantcheva, in the second.

As a direct entrant to a $25k event at Makinohara, Japan the following week, she battled past world No. 192, Seiko Okamoto, in the first round and world No. 349, Ayumi Morita, in the semifinals, but otherwise did not drop a set in claiming her second career $25k title.

This result elevated her world ranking to a personal-best world No. 294 by the time of her entry into her next $25k draw at Sutama, Japan early in November. On this occasion, she won the whole tournament without losing a single set, defeating world No. 199, Shiho Hisamatsu, in the final to take her third $25k title and fourth ITF tournament victory.

In December, she tried her hand at qualifying for a $50k tournament at Palm Beach Gardens, Florida, but was defeated in three sets in the qualifying round by a lower-ranked player from Taipei. However, she entered the main draw as a lucky loser, and knocked out world No. 110, Saori Obata, in the first round, before losing to world No. 225, Tiffany Dabek of the U.S., in round two.

The year ended for her with a win–loss record of 28–8 and a world ranking of 244th.

=== 2006 ===
The Russian 16-year-old began 2006 by attempting to qualify for the Tier IV Pattaya Open, but lost in the first round of the qualifying draw to American world No. 125, Bethanie Mattek.

Then in April, having skipped Indian Wells, she was awarded a wildcard into the main draw at Miami, but was defeated in the first round by French world No. 47, Virginie Razzano.

In May, she retreated again to the $25k level in Italy, playing back-to-back tournaments at Caserta and Campobasso. She reached the final in the first of these, recording four straight sets wins including victories over Sanja Ančić in the quarterfinals and world No. 241, Alizé Cornet, in the semifinals. But at the last hurdle she lost to world No. 270, Mandy Minella of Luxembourg. Then the following week at Campobasso, she gained her revenge over Minella by defeating her in the final to pick up the fourth $25k title of her career, having earlier again put out Ančić in the semifinals.

On the strength of these two tournaments, she entered the top 200 for the first time in her career.

In late July, world-ranked 198th, she attempted to qualify for the Tier IV event at Budapest, and for the first time in her career succeeded in qualifying for a WTA main draw, after defeating world No. 117, María José Martínez Sánchez, in the qualifying round. But world No. 107, Laura Pous Tió, defeated her in the first-round proper.

A month later, ranked 193rd, she attempted again to qualify for a $50k event at the Bronx, but was defeated in straight sets by a slightly lower-ranked opponent, Natalie Grandin, in the first round of the qualifying draw.

She followed up this disappointment by attempting to qualify for a Grand Slam main draw for the first time at the US Open, and progressed to the qualifying round with wins over world No. 115, Tamarine Tanasugarn, and world No. 224, Shiho Hisamatsu, then lost to world No. 130, Sandra Klösel, in straight sets.

Returning to Moscow in early October, she tried again to qualify for the annual Tier I event there, but this time lost in the second round of qualifying to her compatriot world No. 84, Vasilisa Bardina.

She next played in early November, where, as a direct entrant into the first round of a $75k tournament at Pittsburgh, she had reached 4–6, 7–6, 1–1 against American world No. 44, Shenay Perry, before her opponent retired. But in the second round, she lost in straight sets to world No. 130, Stéphanie Dubois.

Her ranking having slipped to world No. 262 by the middle of the month following her failure to defend her $25k tournament victories a year previously, she nonetheless gained direct entry into a $50k event at Lawrenceville, Georgia, and easily surpassed her previous career-best record at this level of tournament by reaching the semifinals with back-to-back straight sets victories over Americans world No. 129, Ahsha Rolle and world No. 104, Bethanie Mattek and world No. 115, Clarisa Fernández. But it was to be an American star of the future, Julie Ditty, then ranked only 297th, who would oust her 6–1, 6–2 in the semifinals.

At the end of November, ranked 238th, Kleybanova entered another $50k draw at San Diego, and beat Ireland's Kelly Liggan in the first round before losing to upcoming compatriot Ekaterina Afinogenova in the second.

She did not play in December, and ended the year ranked world No. 262. Her win–loss record for the year was 20–10.

=== 2007 ===
Starting the new season relatively late at a $25k event at Minsk in early March, Kleybanova could only reach the quarterfinals before losing in three sets to British world No. 222, Amanda Keen, having had to struggle through two three-sets victories over lower-ranked players Lina Stančiūtė of Lithuania and fellow-Russian Anastasia Pavlyuchenkova to reach even that far.

At Moscow at the end of March, she entered another $25k tournament, and this time reached the semifinals without dropping a set after her quarterfinal opponent world No. 232, Nika Ožegović of Croatia, retired at 1–4 down to the Russian teenager. But in the semifinals she was defeated by another young Russian, world No. 199 Evgeniya Rodina.

In Moscow again two months later, she reached her second successive $25k semifinal, this time losing to a compatriot, world No. 224 Ekaterina Makarova.

By the middle of July, Kleybanova continued at the $25k level into the early summer, she reached a quarterfinal at Rome in mid-July before losing in straight sets to lower-ranked Austrian Patricia Mayr.

But the following week, still in Italy at Monteroni d'Arbia, she won her fifth career $25k title and first of the year, after defeating world No. 195, Darya Kustova of Belarus, in the semifinals, and Estonian world No. 223, Margit Rüütel, in the final.

A week later, she decided to step up to the $75k level for the first time that year, and gained direct entry to an event of that calibre at Rimini, Italy. Having battled past both her first two opponents by the identical scoreline of, including Ukrainian world No. 174, Mariya Koryttseva in round one, to reach her career-first $75k main-draw quarterfinal, she then found herself engaged in a very close battle with Swiss world No. 133 and former top-100 player, Emmanuelle Gagliardi, which the Russian eventually lost in three sets.

Back in Moscow again in late August, buoyed by her recent successes to world No. 208, she reached another $25k semifinal, defeating Kristina Antoniychuk in the quarterfinals before losing to fellow-Russian upstart Anastasia Pivovarova.

In the next two weeks, she entered two further $50k tournaments. In the first, at Moscow, she lost a close three-set match in the first round to compatriot Anastasia Poltoratskaya, whom she had easily beaten in the first round of the $25k tournament the previous week. Then at Mestre, Italy, she reached her career-first $50k final with back-to-back defeats of world No. 202, Jenifer Widjaja of Brazil, world No. 191, Ivana Lisjak of Croatia, and Czech players world No. 144, Barbora Záhlavová-Strýcová and world No. 119, Renata Voráčová. But she was denied the title by world No. 150, Rossana de los Ríos of Paraguay, who took the final in three sets.

This performance lifted Kleybanova to a ranking of 195th, just below her personal best set in the summer of 2006, in time for entering her first $100k draw at Bordeaux, France the very week after. Here, she scored successive three-sets defeats over French world No. 86, Pauline Parmentier and former top-100 star, now world No. 141, Laura Pous Tió. But she lost in the quarterfinals to world No. 68, Alizé Cornet.

Playing her fifth straight tournament in five weeks at Lecce, Italy in the middle of September, world-ranked a career-best 184th, the young Russian captured the sixth $25k title of her career. Having lost the first set of her first round tie against Andrea Hlaváčková in round one, she then reeled off ten straight sets for the loss of only 17 more games to claim the tournament, beating formerly top-50-ranked Spaniard Marta Marrero in the final, 6–1, 6–0.

Arriving back in Moscow for the annual Tier-I event held there in October, world-ranked 163rd, she was defeated in the first round of the qualifying draw by Ukrainian world No. 130, Tatiana Perebiynis.

A week later, she found herself back at Lawrenceville, Georgia for a $50k event, and knocked out American world No. 92 Ashley Harkleroad in the first round, but was defeated in the second by a much lower-ranked American wildcard Alexa Glatch.

In the last full week of October at Augusta, Georgia, she virtually breezed through a $25k draw for the loss of just 17 games, eight of them taken from her by just one of her five opponents, Argentine Clarisa Fernández, in the quarterfinals. Notable among her squarely vanquished opponents was American world No. 244, Madison Brengle, whom she beat 6–0, 6–2 in round two. It was the seventh $25k title Kleybanova had won in her short career, and the third of that year.

Elevated to a new career-best world ranking of 153rd in time for her direct entry into a $75k draw at Pittsburgh in early November, the Russian scored victories over world No. 180, Sunitha Rao, and world No. 112, Aleksandra Wozniak, to reach the quarterfinals, but then lost a topsy-turvy three-setter to her 92nd-ranked compatriot Olga Puchkova.

A week later at La Quinta, California, she reached the quarterfinals of a $50k event, beating world No. 151, Abigail Spears, in round two before losing to another American player, world No. 176 Raquel Kops-Jones in the quarterfinals.

Kleybanova did not play in December, but ended the year world-ranked down just a few places from her recently set career best at 156th, and with a strong 41–13 win–loss record to her credit. Although she had scored many of her main draw match wins at the $25k level which she had already conquered several times back in 2005, she had also broken new ground at higher levels of competition in the second half of the year.

=== 2008 ===
Kleybanova began the 2008 season early by entering qualifying for the Tier-III tournament at Gold Coast, Queensland in late December 2007. She qualified for the main draw of a WTA event for just the second time in her career so far, some 17 months after reaching the Tier-IV main draw at Budapest in July 2006. Her vanquished opponents were world No. 97, Tatiana Perebiynis, whom she defeated in the first round of qualifying, world No. 121, Yuan Meng of China, whom she beat in the second, and former top-50 star Zheng Jie, whom she ousted 6–2, 4–6, 6–1 in the qualifying round. But in the first round of the main draw, she faced Swiss world No. 16, Patty Schnyder, and lost to her 1–6, 3–6.

In mid-January, she followed this up by entering qualifying for the Australian Open, and came through relatively comfortably to the first Grand Slam main draw of her still-young career with straight-sets wins over Canadian world No. 166, Marie-Ève Pelletier, Czech world No. 116 Iveta Benešová, and French world No. 136, Olivia Sanchez. In the first round of the main draw, she defeated world No. 45, Peng Shuai, 7–5, 4–6, 9–7. But in round two she had to face world No. 6, Anna Chakvetadze, and lost to her in straight sets.

Nonetheless, in reaching the second round of a Grand Slam tournament as a qualifier, Kleybanova had earned 91 ranking points, sufficient to raise her ranking to a new personal best of 112th.

The next tournament for which she entered herself was another high-level WTA Tour event, the Tier II fixture at Paris in early February. She won the first two rounds of qualifying, defeating fellow Russian world No. 127, Galina Voskoboeva, in the first and a Belgian outsider in the second, but then lost to world No. 70, Klára Zakopalová, in the qualifying round. She emerged from this experience ranked just six places higher at world No. 106.

The following week, undeterred, she attempted to qualify for another Tier-II tournament at Antwerp, Belgium, and this time succeeded, after defeating world No. 206, Ekaterina Dzehalevich, 6–3, 7–6 in the second round of the qualifying draw, and Swedish world No. 67, Sofia Arvidsson, 4–6, 7–5, 6–3 in the qualifying round. In the first round of the main draw, she stunned world No. 18, Ágnes Szávay, 6–2, 6–3; and in the second she edged out world No. 38, Kateryna Bondarenko, in an extremely close match to reach her career-first WTA-level quarterfinal, where she met world No. 1, Justine Henin, for the first time. Although the Russian teenager lost 4–6, 3–6, she was assured of taking home enough ranking points from this event to reach the top 100 for the first time in her career; and in practice she landed at world No. 82.

In late February, she entered the qualifying draw for the Tier-II event at Dubai and defeated world No. 60, Timea Bacsinszky, in the first round before losing a very close three-set battle in the second round of qualifying to rising world No. 123, Monica Niculescu, despite winning more games than her opponent in the overall match.

In early March, her ranking having slipped just a couple of places to No. 84, she entered qualifying for the Tier-I Indian Wells Open, having failed by only one place to attain direct entry, but unexpectedly fell at the first hurdle in three sets to world No. 186, Rika Fujiwara.

Towards the end of the month, she persevered in attempting to gain entry to events of Tier-I calibre at Miami, and this time succeeded, scoring back-to-back comfortable straight-sets victories over Hungarian world No. 127, Gréta Arn, and resurgent former top-50 star Mashona Washington of the US, for the collective loss of just nine games in two matches. In the main draw, she defeated world No. 44, Olga Govortsova, then unexpectedly one-sidedly thrashed world No. 15, Nicole Vaidišová, to reach the third round, where she lost to on-form world No. 20, Vera Zvonareva, 1–6, 4–6. The 65 ranking points accrued from this performance lifted her world ranking to a new career high of 70.

At Wimbledon in June, Kleybanova played in three events: singles, doubles (with Dominika Cibulková), and mixed doubles (with Sonchat Ratiwatana of Thailand). In singles, she made it to the fourth round, her best career Grand Slam tournament result, losing to the reigning Wimbledon champion and seventh seed, Venus Williams. On the way, she defeated unseeded Tzipora Obziler of Israel in the first round, beat tenth seed Daniela Hantuchová in the second round, and overcame unseeded Ai Sugiyama in the third round. She retired in the first round of ladies' doubles and lost in the first round of mixed doubles.

=== 2009 ===
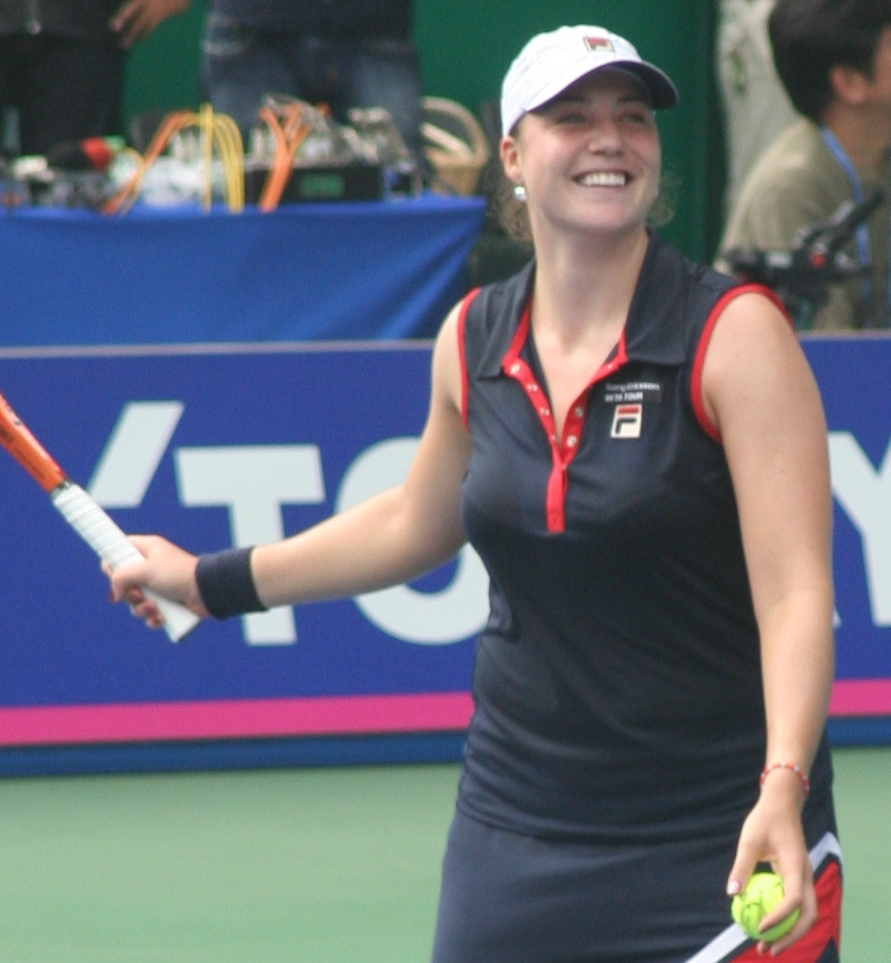
Kleybanova at the 2009 Pan Pacific Open

Kleybanova began her 2009 season at the Brisbane International where she upset sixth seed Kaia Kanepi in the first round but lost in the second round to Tathiana Garbin. Kleybanova was defeated in the second round at the Sydney International by Alizé Cornet. Seeded 29th at the Australian Open, Kleybanova made it to the third round after wins over Sofia Arvidsson and Stéphanie Cohen-Aloro. In the third round, she stunned fifth seed and last year finalist Ana Ivanovic. Her run ended in the fourth round where she lost to Australian wildcard Jelena Dokić.

Playing in the Fed Cup tie against China, Kleybanova played only one rubber; she beat Sun Tiantian. In the end, Russia won the tie 5–0.

=== 2010 ===
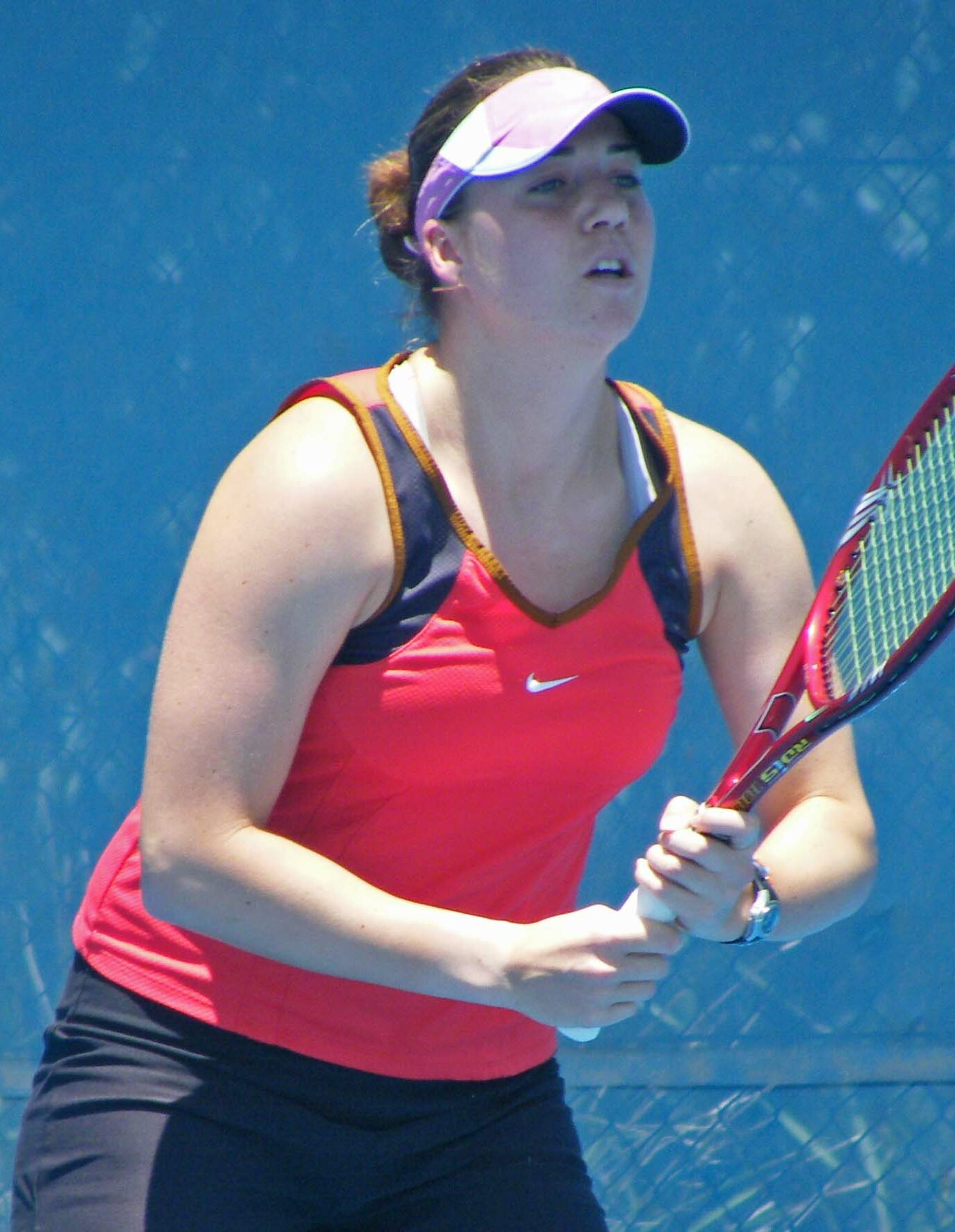
Kleybanova at the 2010 Sydney International.

Kleybanova started off the year falling in three sets to Anastasia Pavlyuchenkova at the Brisbane International in the first round where Alisa was the fifth seed. She then fell to world No. 3, Svetlana Kuznetsova, in the first round of the Sydney International, falling 5–7 in the third set.

Kleybanova was seeded 27th at the Australian Open. She lost a hard-fought three setter to Justine Henin in the third round, despite having been near match point numerous times.

At the 2010 Fed Cup, Kleybanova represented Russia along with Svetlana Kuznetsova. Kleybanova fell in three sets to Jelena Janković in her first match, but blew past Ana Ivanovic in her second match. Kleybanova and Kuznetsova then defeated Ivanovic and Janković in doubles to help Russia advance.

At the Open GDF Suez in Paris, Kleybanova fell to world No. 12, Flavia Pennetta. At the Malaysian Open, Kleybanova won her first WTA singles title, defeating world No. 7, Elena Dementieva, in the final in straight sets.

Kleybanova's good form continued into the Indian Wells Open where she was seeded 23rd. She, like all seeds, received a bye into the second round where she then defeated qualifier Tsvetana Pironkova. In the third round she overcame another tight three-setter, defeating former world No. 1, 2009 US Open champion and No. 14 seed Kim Clijsters, 6–4, 1–6, 7–6. In the fourth round, she came back from a set down and had to work hard to defeat an in-form Carla Suárez Navarro (who took out the top seed Svetlana Kuznetsova in the second round). Kleybanova played Jelena Janković in the quarterfinal. This time, Jelena celebrated, winning 6–4, 6–4.

=== 2011 ===
Kleybanova's 2011 tour started-off on a bad note as she lost to wildcard Sally Peers in the first round at Brisbane International but fared better at doubles, winning with compatriot Pavlyuchenkova for her fourth WTA doubles title.

She went off on a better note at the Sydney International by upsetting fifth seed Francesca Schiavone and prevailing over María José Martínez Sánchez. After defeating Dominika Cibulková, she would lose to No. 3 seed Kim Clijsters, 6–4, 3–6, 6–7.

At Indian Wells, Kleybanova went on to reach the fourth round in which she lost to world No. 1, Caroline Wozniacki.

She had to withdraw from the French Open due to illness and was thus replaced by Anastasia Pivovarova. However, she remained seeded, because she withdrew late from the tournament.

On 14 July, it was revealed that Alisa had been diagnosed with stage 2 Hodgkin's lymphoma. This provided an explanation to her withdrawals from tournaments in Roland Garros and Wimbledon. She underwent treatment in Italy, her last tournament of 2011 being played in Rome.

=== 2012 ===
On 29 February, Alisa announced via an official statement on the WTA Tour website that she has successfully completed her treatment for Hodgkin's lymphoma and has started training in Florida. She launched her comeback at the Miami Open as a wildcard into the main draw.

=== 2013 ===
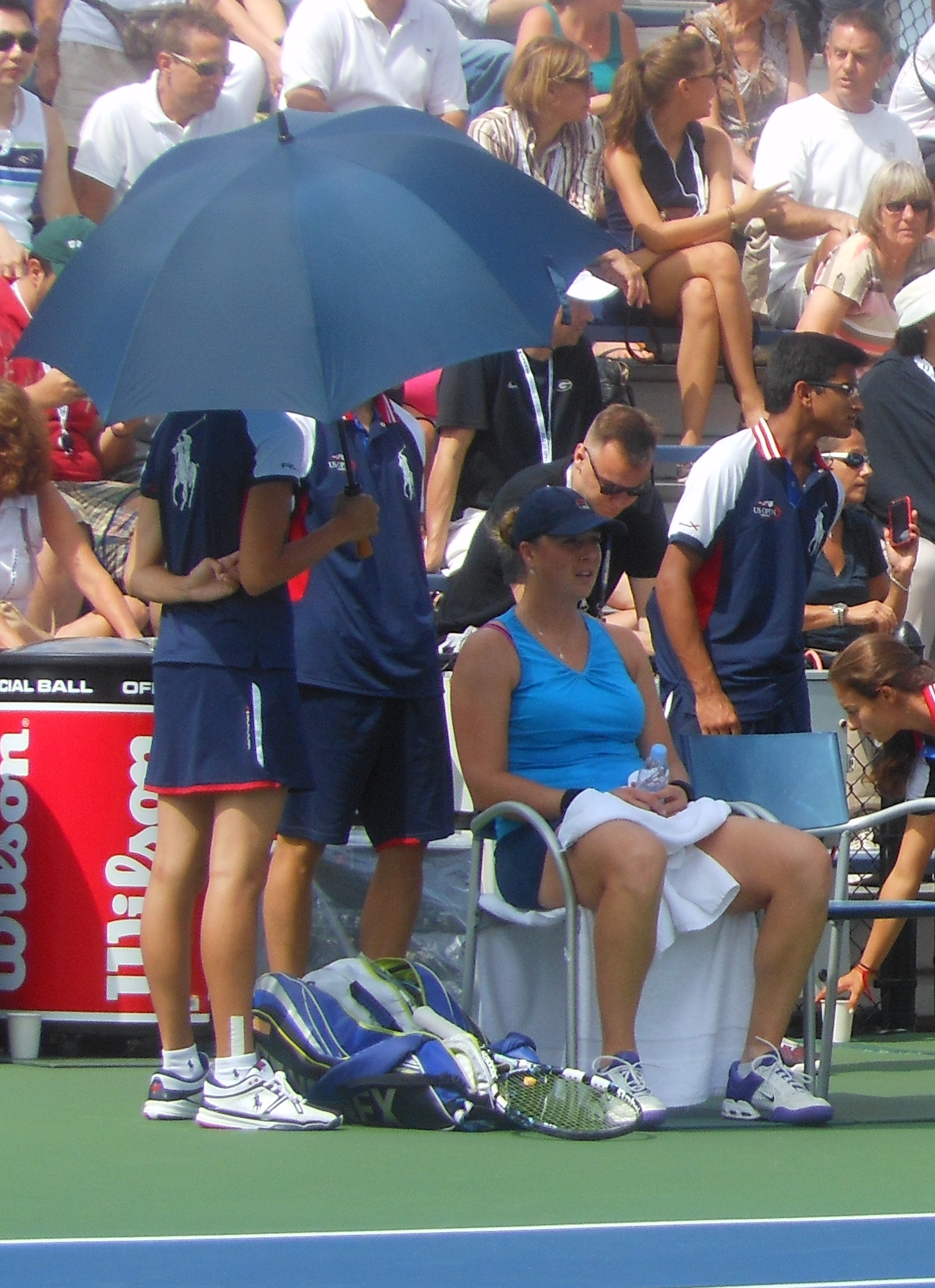
Kleybanova at the 2013 US Open

Kleybanova made her official comeback in 2013, stating that she had not been ready in Miami the previous year. The week of 13 May, she played a $10k tournament in Landisville, Pennsylvania. She took the singles title with a two-set victory over Natalie Pluskota, after winning three matches to qualify and four others in the main draw, to total eight. As she missed the deadline to participate in the Wimbledon Championships under a protected ranking, she applied for a wild card, but was turned down. On the week 17 June, she played another $10k in Buffalo, New York, reaching the semifinals with the loss of one set. Here she smashed the fourth seed 6–0, 6–4 to extend her unbeaten streak to twelve matches and set up a contest with Alexandra Mueller in the final. However, she lost the contest in straight sets.

On 1 July, Kleybanova competed at an $50k in Sacramento. After going through three rounds of qualifying, she defeated Brooke Austin and Mary Weatherholt, both in straight sets, before losing to Ivana Lisjak, 6–0, 2–6, 6–7. She then played for the Springfield Lasers in World TeamTennis, playing mostly doubles.

Alisa made her comeback to the WTA Tour at the Rogers Cup held in Toronto, Canada, under a protected ranking. She lost to Eugenie Bouchard in the first round. She then played at the Western & Southern Open, another Premier tournament, where she drew qualifier Sofia Arvidsson in the first round. Alisa came through in a thrilling match lasting almost three hours, winning 4–6, 6–4, 7–6. Against Angelique Kerber in round two, she lost despite having match points in the final set.

Alisa played her first Grand Slam tournament since recovering from cancer at the US Open. In the first round, she scored her biggest victory of the year against Monica Puig 6–4, 3–6, 7–5 in a marathon match, but ultimately lost in the second round to former world No. 1 Jelena Janković, and the performance lifted her ranking to No. 248.

In October, Alisa competed at her home tournament, the WTA Premier Kremlin Cup in Moscow, under a main-draw wildcard entry. She defeated Varvara Lepchenko in the first round on 14 October in three sets.

=== 2014 ===
At the Porsche Tennis Grand Prix in Stuttgart, Kleybanova recorded her first top-ten victory in over three years when she upset former Wimbledon champion Petra Kvitová, in straight sets in the second round. With this victory, she returned to the WTA's top 100 for the first time since 2011.

=== 2015 ===
Kleybanova made her comeback at an $10k tournament in Antalya where she won the title, beating top seed Lina Gjorcheska in the final in straight sets.

== Performance timelines ==
Key
W	F	SF	QF	#R	RR	Q#	P#	DNQ	A	Z#	PO	G	S	B	NMS	NTI	P	NH

(W) winner; (F) finalist; (SF) semifinalist; (QF) quarterfinalist; (#R) rounds 4, 3, 2, 1; (RR) round-robin stage; (Q#) qualification round; (P#) preliminary round; (DNQ) did not qualify; (A) absent; (Z#) Davis/Fed Cup Zonal Group (with number indication) or (PO) play-off; (G) gold, (S) silver or (B) bronze Olympic/Paralympic medal; (NMS) not a Masters tournament; (NTI) not a Tier I tournament; (P) postponed; (NH) not held; (SR) strike rate (events won / competed); (W–L) win–loss record.
To avoid confusion and double counting, these charts are updated at the conclusion of a tournament or when the player's participation has ended.

Only main-draw results in WTA Tour, Grand Slam tournaments, Fed Cup and Olympic Games are included in win–loss records.

=== Singles ===
Tournament	2004	2005	2006	2007	2008	2009	2010	2011	2012	2013	2014	SR	W–L	Win%
Grand Slam tournaments
Australian Open	A	A	A	A	2R	4R	3R	2R	A	A	Q1	0 / 4	7–4	64%
French Open	A	A	A	A	2R	1R	3R	A	A	A	1R	0 / 4	3–4	43%
Wimbledon	A	A	A	A	4R	2R	3R	A	A	A	1R	0 / 4	6–4	60%
US Open	A	A	Q3	A	2R	1R	2R	A	A	2R	A	0 / 4	3–4	43%
Win–loss	0–0	0–0	0–0	0–0	6–4	4–4	7–4	1–1	0–0	1–1	0–2	0 / 16	19–16	54%
Premier Mandatory & 5 + former
Dubai / Qatar Open (Note: The first Premier 5 event of the year has switched back and forth between the Dubai Tennis Championships and the Qatar Ladies Open since 2009. Dubai was classified as a Premier 5 event from 2009 to 2011 before being succeeded by Doha for the 2012–2014 period. In 2015, Dubai regained its Premier 5 status while Doha was demoted to Premier status. The Premier 5 tournaments were reclassified as WTA 1000 tournaments in 2021.)	NMS				A	2R	1R	QF	A	A	3R	0 / 4	6–4	60%
Indian Wells Open	2R	1R	A	A	Q1	3R	QF	4R	A	A	4R	0 / 6	10–6	63%
Miami Open	A	Q2	1R	A	3R	4R	2R	2R	2R	A	2R (Note: Withdraw during the tournament. Not counted as a loss.)	0 / 7	6–6	50%
Berlin / Madrid Open (Note: In 2009, the German Open was replaced by the Madrid Open. The Premier Mandatory tournaments were reclassified as WTA 1000 tournaments in 2021.)	A	A	A	NH	2R	3R	2R	2R	A	A	Q1	0 / 4	5–4	56%
Italian Open	A	A	A	A	1R	1R	1R	2R	A	A	A	0 / 4	1–4	20%
Canadian Open	A	A	A	A	2R	SF	2R	A	A	1R	A	0 / 4	6–3	67%
Cincinnati Open	NMS					2R	2R	A	A	2R	A	0 / 3	3–3	50%
Pan Pacific / Wuhan Open (Note: In 2014, the Pan Pacific Open was downgraded to a Premier event and replaced by the Wuhan Open. The Premier 5 tournaments were reclassified as WTA 1000 tournaments in 2021.)	A	A	A	A	A	3R	1R	A	A	A	NP5	0 / 2	2–2	50%
China Open	NMS					2R	2R	A	A	A	A	0 / 2	2–2	50%
Kremlin Cup (former)	A	Q2	Q2	Q1	A	NMS						0 / 0	0–0	–
Win–loss	1–1	0–1	0–1	0–0	4–3	14–9	7–9	7–5	1–1	1–2	6–2	0 / 36	41–34	55%
Career statistics
Tournaments	1	1	2	0	16	24	25	12	1	4	8	Career total: 94		
Titles	0	0	0	0	0	0	2	0	0	0	0	Career total: 2		
Finals	0	0	0	0	0	0	3	0	0	0	0	Career total: 3		
Overall win–loss	1–1	0–1	0–2	0–0	17–15	32–24	33–24	14–12	1–1	4–5	8–7	2 / 94	110–92	54%
Year-end ranking	364	244	262	150	33	26	25	69	549	185	140	$2,492,031		

=== Doubles ===
Tournament	2006	2007	2008	2009	2010	2011	2012	2013	2014	W–L
Grand Slam tournaments
Australian Open	A	A	A	1R	QF	2R	A	A	A	4–3
French Open	A	A	2R	2R	2R	A	A	A	3R	5–4
Wimbledon	A	A	1R	QF	A	A	A	A	1R	3–3
US Open	A	A	2R	SF	2R	A	A	1R	A	6–4
Win–loss	0–0	0–0	2–3	8–4	5–3	1–1	0–0	0–1	2–2	18–14
WTA Premier Mandatory & 5 + former
Dubai / Qatar Open	NMS		2R	1R	QF	2R	A	A	A	4–4
Indian Wells Open	A	A	A	QF	2R	1R	A	A	A	3–3
Miami Open	A	A	A	1R	QF	2R	1R	A	A	3–4
Berlin / Madrid Open	A	A	A	1R	2R	A	A	A	A	1–2
Italian Open	A	A	1R	A	A	A	A	A	2R	1–2
Canadian Open	A	A	1R	QF	1R	A	A	1R	A	2–4
Cincinnati Open	NMS			QF	1R	A	A	2R	A	3–3
Pan Pacific / Wuhan Open	A	A	A	W	1R	A	A	A	A	3–1
China Open	NMS			SF	1R	A	A	A	A	3–2
Kremlin Cup (former)	2R	A	A	NMS						1–1
Win–loss	1–1	0–0	1–3	12–7	6–8	2–3	0–1	1–2	1–1	24–26

== Significant finals ==
=== Year-end championships ===
==== Singles: 1 (runner-up) ====
Result	Year	Tournament	Surface	Opponent	Score
Loss	2010	Tournament of Championships, Bali	Hard	(Serbia) Ana Ivanovic	2–6, 6–7^{(5–7)}

=== WTA Premier Mandatory & 5 ===
==== Doubles: 1 (title) ====
Result	Year	Tournament	Surface	Partner	Opponents	Score
Win	2009	Pan Pacific Open	Hard	(Italy) Francesca Schiavone	(Slovakia) Daniela Hantuchová (Japan) Ai Sugiyama	6–4, 6–2

== WTA Tour finals ==
=== Singles: 3 (2 titles, 1 runner-up) ===
Legend WTA Elite Trophy (0–1) International (2–0)	Finals by surface Hard (2–1)

Result	W–L	Date	Tournament	Tier	Surface	Opponent	Score
Win	1–0	Feb 2010	Malaysian Open	International	Hard	(Russia) Elena Dementieva	6–3, 6–2
Win	2–0	Sep 2010	Korea Open, South Korea	International	Hard	(Czech Republic) Klára Zakopalová	6–1, 6–3
Loss	2–1	Nov 2010	WTA Tournament of Champions	Elite (Note: Formerly known as WTA Tournament of Champions until 2015.)	Hard (i)	(Serbia) Ana Ivanovic	2–6, 6–7^{(5–7)}

=== Doubles: 6 (5 titles, 1 runner-up) ===
Legend Premier M & Premier 5 (1–0) International (4–1)	Finals by surface Hard (2–0) Clay (3–1)

Result	W–L	Date	Tournament	Tier	Surface	Partner	Opponents	Score
Loss	0–1	May 2008	Morocco Open	Tier IV (Note: In 2009, the WTA Tier II tournaments were reclassified as WTA Premier tournaments, while the WTA Tier III tournaments, WTA Tier IV tournaments and WTA Tier V tournaments were reclassified as WTA International tournaments.)	Clay	(Russia) Ekaterina Makarova	(Romania) Sorana Cîrstea (Russia) Anastasia Pavlyuchenkova	2–6, 2–6
Win	1–1	May 2009	Morocco Open	International	Clay	(Russia) Ekaterina Makarova	(Romania) Sorana Cîrstea (Russia) Maria Kirilenko	6–3, 2–6, [10–8]
Win	2–1	Jul 2009	Budapest Grand Prix, Hungary	International	Clay	(Romania) Monica Niculescu	(Ukraine) Alona Bondarenko (Ukraine) Kateryna Bondarenko	6–4, 7–6^{(7–5)}
Win	3–1	Oct 2009	Pan Pacific Open, Japan	Premier 5	Hard (i)	(Italy) Francesca Schiavone	(Slovenia) Daniela Hantuchová (Japan) Ai Sugiyama	6–4, 6–2
Win	4–1	Jan 2011	Brisbane International, Australia	International	Hard	(Russia) Anastasia Pavlyuchenkova	(Poland) Klaudia Jans (Poland) Alicja Rosolska	6–3, 7–5
Win	5–1	Apr 2011	Portugal Open	International	Clay	(Kazakhstan) Galina Voskoboeva	(Greece) Eleni Daniilidou (Netherlands) Michaëlla Krajicek	6–4, 6–2

== ITF finals ==
=== Singles: 21 (14 titles, 7 runner-ups) ===
Legend $50,000 tournaments (2–1) $25,000 tournaments (8–3) $10,000 tournaments (4–3)	Finals by surface Hard (3–1) Clay (9–6) Carpet (2–0)

Result	W–L	Date	Tournament	Tier	Surface	Opponent	Score
Win	1–0	Sep 2003	ITF Mollerussa, Spain	10,000	Clay	(China) Quan Gao	7–6^{(2)}, 6–2
Loss	1–1	Sep 2003	ITF Madrid, Spain	10,000	Clay	(Spain) Ana Salas Lozano	4–6, 1–6
Loss	1–2	Apr 2004	ITF Jackson, United States	25,000	Clay	(Russia) Evgenia Linetskaya	6–4, 2–6, 4–6
Win	2–2	Aug 2005	ITF Moscow, Russia	25,000	Clay	(Russia) Vasilisa Bardina	6–2, 6–2
Win	3–2	Oct 2005	ITF Makinohara, Japan	25,000	Carpet	(Japan) Akiko Yonemura	6–0, 6–1
Win	4–2	Nov 2005	ITF Sutama, Japan	25,000	Clay	(Japan) Shiho Hisamatsu	6–3, 7–5
Loss	4–3	May 2006	ITF Caserta, Italy	25,000	Clay	(Luxembourg) Mandy Minella	2–6, 4–6
Win	5–3	May 2006	ITF Campobasso, Italy	25,000	Clay	(Luxembourg) Mandy Minella	2–6, 6–3, 6–3
Win	6–3	Jul 2007	ITF Monteroni, Italy	25,000	Clay	(Estonia) Margit Rüütel	6–1, 7–5
Loss	6–4	Sep 2007	ITF Mestre, Italy	50,000	Clay	(Paraguay) Rossana de los Ríos	4–6, 6–3, 1–6
Win	7–4	Sep 2007	ITF Lecce, Italy	25,000	Clay	(Estonia) Marta Marrero	6–1, 6–0
Win	8–4	Oct 2007	ITF Augusta, United States	25,000	Hard	(Germany) Tanja Ostertag	6–2, 6–1
Win	9–4	Oct 2008	ITF Podolsk, Russia	50,000	Carpet (i)	(Russia) Ksenia Pervak	7–6^{(5)}, 6–0
Win	10–4	Nov 2008	ITF Minsk, Belarus	50,000	Hard (i)	(Czech Republic) Eva Hrdinová	6–1, 4–6, 6–2
Win	11–4	May 2013	ITF Landisville, United States	10,000	Hard	(United States) Natalie Pluskota	6–3, 6–0
Loss	11–5	Jun 2013	ITF Buffalo, United States	10,000	Clay	(United States) Alexandra Mueller	5–7, 4–6
Win	12–5	Nov 2015	ITF Antalya, Turkey	10,000	Clay	(North Macedonia) Lina Gjorcheska	6–3, 6–4
Loss	12–6	Nov 2015	ITF Antalya, Turkey	10,000	Clay	(Hungary) Anna Bondár	3–6, 4–6
Win	13–6	Dec 2015	ITF Antalya, Turkey	10,000	Clay	(Armenia) Ani Amiraghyan	6–4, 6–3
Loss	13–7	Jul 2017	ITF Hua Hin, Thailand	25,000	Hard	(Thailand) Luksika Kumkhum	5–7, 7–6^{(4)}, 3–6
Win	14–7	Sep 2017	ITF Lubbock, United States	25,000	Hard	(United States) Victoria Duval	6–0, 6–2

=== Doubles: 15 (13 titles, 2 runner-ups) ===
Legend $100,000 tournaments (0–1) $75,000 tournaments (2–0) $50,000 tournaments (4–0) $25,000 tournaments (6–1) $10,000 tournaments (1–0)	Finals by surface Hard (7–1) Clay (6–1)

Result	W–L	Date	Tournament	Tier	Surface	Partner	Opponents	Score
Win	1–0	Jan 2004	ITF Tampa, United States	10,000	Hard	(Japan) Mayumi Yamamoto	(United States) Milangela Morales (United States) Sunitha Rao	6–2, 6–4
Win	2–0	Apr 2004	ITF Jackson, United States	25,000	Clay	(Canada) Stéphanie Dubois	(United States) Cory Ann Avants (United States) Kristen Schlukebir	6–2, 6–3
Win	3–0	May 2006	ITF Campobasso, Italy	25,000	Clay	(Czech Republic) Nikola Fraňková	(Russia) Elena Chalova (Czech Republic) Renata Voráčová	walkover
Win	4–0	Nov 2006	ITF Pittsburgh, United States	75,000	Hard (i)	(Canada) Stéphanie Dubois	(United States) Ashley Harkleroad (Russia) Galina Voskoboeva	6–4, 5–7, 6–1
Win	5–0	Apr 2007	ITF Moscow, Russia	25,000	Hard (i)	(Russia) Evgeniya Rodina	(Australia) Arina Rodionova (Belarus) Ekaterina Dzehalevich	7–6, 6–0
Win	6–0	May 2007	ITF Moscow, Russia	25,000	Clay	(Russia) Ekaterina Makarova	(Russia) Ekaterina Afinogenova (Ukraine) Oksana Uzhylovska	6–3, 6–7^{(4)}, 6–3
Win	7–0	Jul 2007	ITF Monteroni, Italy	25,000	Clay	(Italy) Valentina Sassi	(Italy) Elena Pioppo (Italy) Verdiana Verardi	7–5, 6–2
Win	8–0	Sep 2007	ITF Moscow, Russia	50,000	Clay	(Russia) Anastasia Pivovarova	(Russia) Vasilisa Davydova (Russia) Maria Kondratieva	6–4, 3–6, 6–2
Win	9–0	Sep 2007	Save Cup, Italy	50,000	Clay	(Estonia) Margit Rüütel	(Bosnia and Herzegovina) Mervana Jugić-Salkić (Belarus) Darya Kustova	6–2, 7–5
Loss	9–1	Sep 2007	ITF Bordeaux, France	100,000	Clay	(Italy) Nathalie Viérin	(Switzerland) Timea Bacsinszky (Germany) Sandra Klösel	6–7^{(2)}, 4–6
Win	10–1	Oct 2007	ITF Lawrenceville, United States	50,000	Hard	(Canada) Stéphanie Dubois	(New Zealand) Leanne Baker (United States) Julie Ditty	6–2, 6–0
Loss	10–2	Oct 2007	ITF Augusta, United States	25,000	Hard	(Russia) Angelina Gabueva	(United States) Madison Brengle (United States) Kristy Frilling	3–6, 3–6
Win	11–2	Nov 2007	ITF Pittsburgh, United States	75,000	Hard (i)	(Canada) Stéphanie Dubois	(United States) Raquel Kops-Jones (United States) Abigail Spears	6–4, 4–6, [10–6]
Win	12–2	Nov 2008	ITF Minsk, Belarus	50,000	Hard (i)	(Belarus) Tatiana Poutchek	(Ukraine) Lesia Tsurenko (Russia) Anastasia Poltoratskaya	6–1, 6–2
Win	13–2	Sep 2017	ITF Lubbock, United States	25,000	Hard	(United States) Victoria Duval	(India) Karman Thandi (Montenegro) Ana Veselinović	2–6, 6–4, [10–8]

== Junior Grand Slam finals ==
=== Girls' doubles: 3 (3 titles) ===
Result	Year	Tournament	Surface	Partner	Opponents	Score
Win	2003	Wimbledon	Grass	(India) Sania Mirza	(Czech Republic) Kateřina Böhmová (Netherlands) Michaëlla Krajicek	2–6, 6–3, 6–2
Win	2005	US Open	Hard	(Czech Republic) Nikola Fraňková	(United States) Alexa Glatch (United States) Vania King	7–5, 7–6^{(3)}
Win	2006	Wimbledon (2)	Grass	(Russia) Anastasia Pavlyuchenkova	(Ukraine) Kristina Antoniychuk (Romania) Alexandra Dulgheru	6–1, 6–2

== Top 10 wins ==
Season	2009	2010	2011	...	2014	Total
Wins	5	2	2		1	10

#	Player	Rank	Event	Surface	Rd	Score	AKR
2009
1.	(Serbia) Ana Ivanovic	No. 5	Australian Open	Hard	3R	7–5, 6–7^{(5–7)}, 6–2	No. 31
2.	(United States) Venus Williams	No. 3	Madrid Open, Spain	Clay	2R	6–3, 3–6, 7–5	No. 26
3.	(Serbia) Jelena Janković	No. 4	Canadian Open	Hard	QF	6–7^{(6–8)}, 7–6^{(9–7)}, 6–2	No. 36
4.	(Russia) Vera Zvonareva	No. 7	Pan Pacific Open, Japan	Hard	2R	3–6, 6–4, 6–2	No. 29
5.	(Serbia) Jelena Janković	No. 9	Kremlin Cup, Russia	Hard	QF	6–4, 6–3	No. 27
2010
6.	(Russia) Elena Dementieva	No. 7	Malaysia Open	Hard	F	6–3, 6–2	No. 29
7.	(Serbia) Jelena Janković	No. 2	Southern California Open, US	Hard	2R	7–5, 6–2	No. 28
2011
8.	(Italy) Francesca Schiavone	No. 7	Sydney International, Australia	Hard	1R	6–7^{(5–7)}, 6–1, 6–2	No. 26
9.	(Russia) Vera Zvonareva	No. 3	Dubai Championships, UAE	Hard	3R	6–3, 6–2	No. 22
2014
10.	(Czech Republic) Petra Kvitová	No. 6	Stuttgart Open, Germany	Clay	2R	6–2, 7–6^{(7–3)}	No. 102

== Notes ==
Awards
Preceded by (Kazakhstan) Yaroslava Shvedova	WTA Comeback Player of the Year; 2013	Succeeded by (Croatia) Mirjana Lučić-Baroni
