= Arina Rodionova =

Russian-Australian tennis player (born 1989)

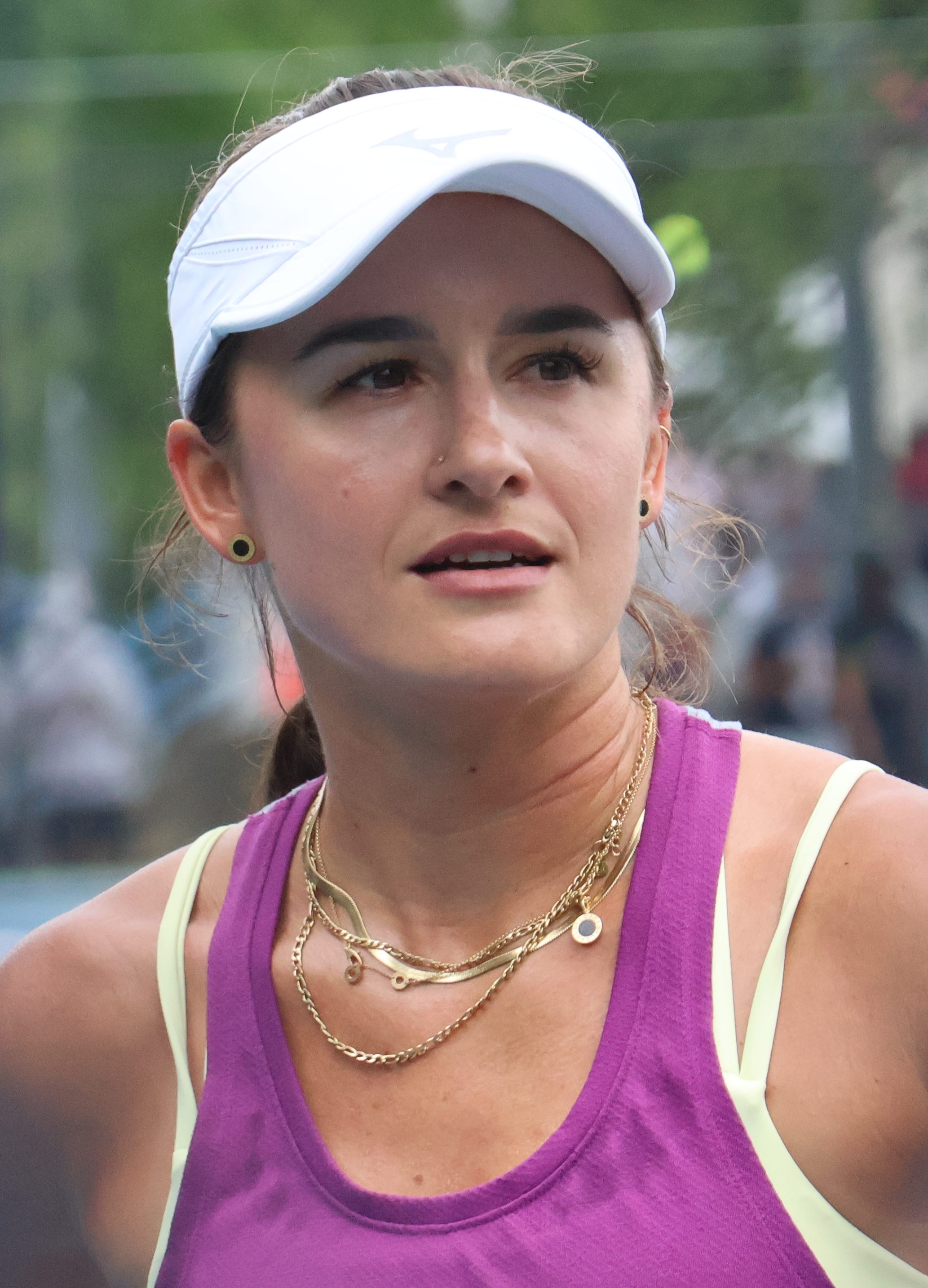
- Rodionova in 2024
- Full name: Arina Ivanovna Rodionova
- Country (sports): Russia (2004–2014); Australia (2014–)
- Residence: Melbourne, Australia
- Born: 15 December 1989 (age 36) Tambov, Russian SFSR, Soviet Union
- Height: 1.68 m (5 ft 6 in)
- Turned pro: 2004
- Plays: Right (two-handed backhand)
- Prize money: US$ 2,647,727
- Official website: rodionova.com

Singles
- Career record: 583–497
- Career titles: 0 WTA, 17 ITF
- Highest ranking: No. 97 (5 February 2024)
- Current ranking: No. 890 (16 November 2026)

Grand Slam singles results
- Australian Open: 2R (2020)
- French Open: 1R (2016)
- Wimbledon: 2R (2017)
- US Open: 2R (2017)

Doubles
- Career record: 433–295
- Career titles: 1 WTA, 1 WTA Challenger
- Highest ranking: No. 41 (27 July 2015)
- Current ranking: No. 461 (16 November 2026)

Grand Slam doubles results
- Australian Open: QF (2016)
- French Open: 3R (2015)
- Wimbledon: 2R (2011, 2014, 2015, 2018, 2019, 2021)
- US Open: 3R (2021)

Grand Slam mixed doubles results
- Australian Open: QF (2021)
- Wimbledon: 3R (2021)

Team competitions
- Fed Cup: 0–2
- Last updated on: 16 November 2026.

Arina Ivanovna Rodionova (Russian: Арина Ивановна Родионова; born 15 December 1989) is a Russian-born Australian inactive tennis player. On 5 February 2024, she reached a career-high singles ranking of world No. 97. On 27 July 2015, she peaked at No. 41 in the doubles rankings.

Rodionova won one WTA Tour and one WTA 125 doubles titles, and 17 singles and 42 doubles titles on the ITF Women's Circuit. In 2007, she won the Australian Open girls' doubles title, partnering Evgeniya Rodina.

Elder sister Anastasia is also a tennis professional, and the two sisters have intermittently contested doubles tournaments together with modest success. Their most notable achievement as a team came at the 2010 Malaysian Open, in which they reached the final before losing to Chan Yung-jan and Zheng Jie in a super tie-break.

== Career ==
Rodionova made her debut as a professional in 2004 at an ITF Women's Circuit event in Protvino, Russia. In 2005, she won a title in Minsk, followed by another win in Moscow the following year. In 2008, she finished as a runner-up in an ITF event in Istanbul. In 2009, Rodionova won two ITF titles in singles and eight in doubles.

=== 2010 ===
In 2010, Rodionova defeated Jarmila Wolfe in the final of a $25k tournament in Burnie. In doubles, she advanced to the final of the WTA Tour-level Malaysian Open with her sister Anastasia. Although they defeated No. 1 seeds Alisa Kleybanova and Yan Zi along the way, the sisters lost the final match to Chan Yung-jan and Zheng Jie in close three sets.

=== 2011 ===
At the Australian Open, Rodionova equalled her career-best showing at a Grand Slam tournament by qualifying for the main draw. She lost in the first round to fellow qualifier Anne Keothavong, 5–7, 4–6. She then won a $50k event in May in Prague, partnering Darya Kustova. She qualified for the Birmingham Classic, and won her first-round match against Virginie Razzano. She then notched the biggest win of her career by defeating No. 1 seed and world No. 16, Kaia Kanepi, in the second round. She lost to the 14th seed Magdaléna Rybáriková in the third round. At Wimbledon, Rodionova barely missed out on qualifying for the main draw by losing to Kristýna Plíšková, in three sets. She achieved very modest results through much of the rest of the year, losing in the first or second round of most tournaments she entered.

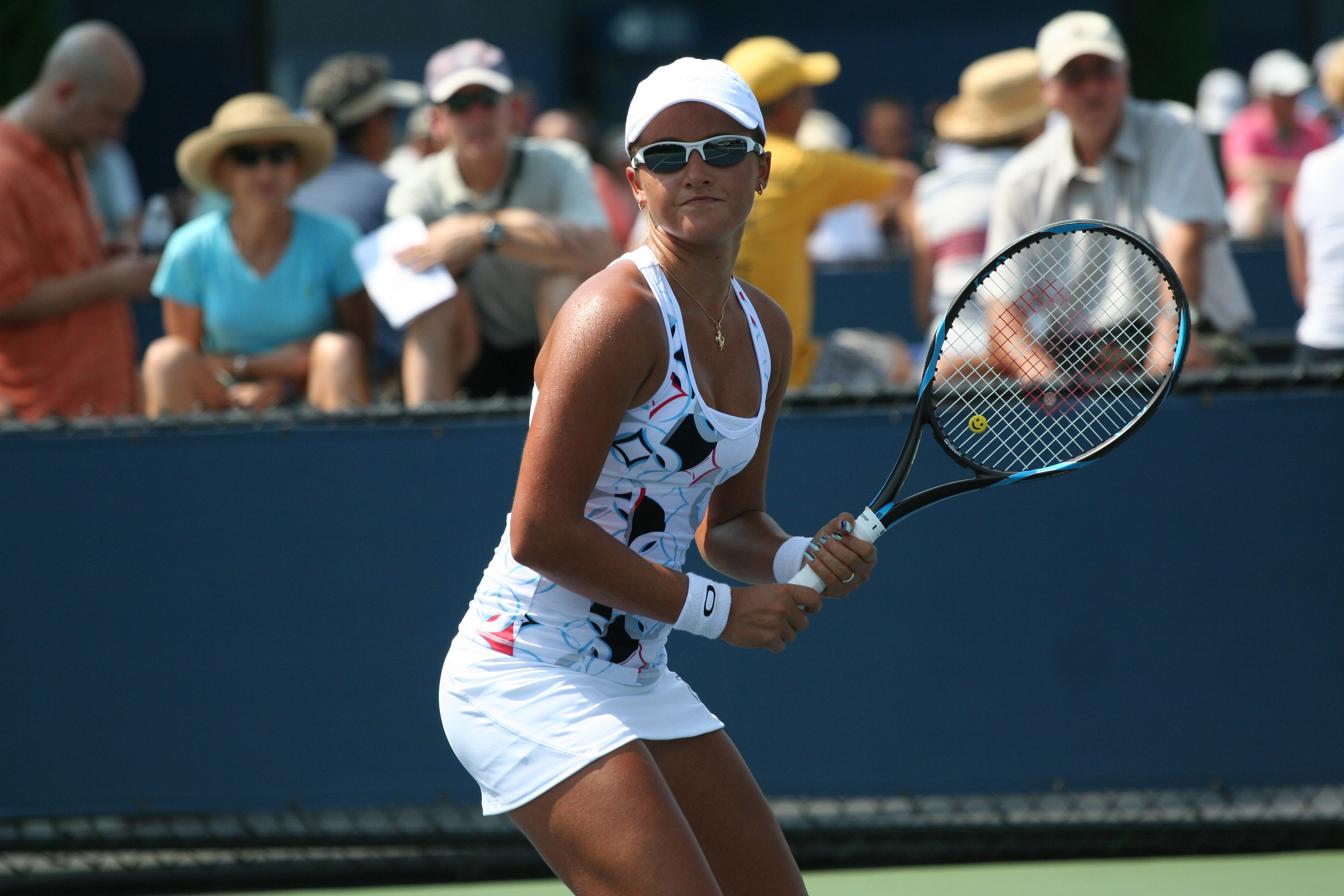
Rodionova in 2010

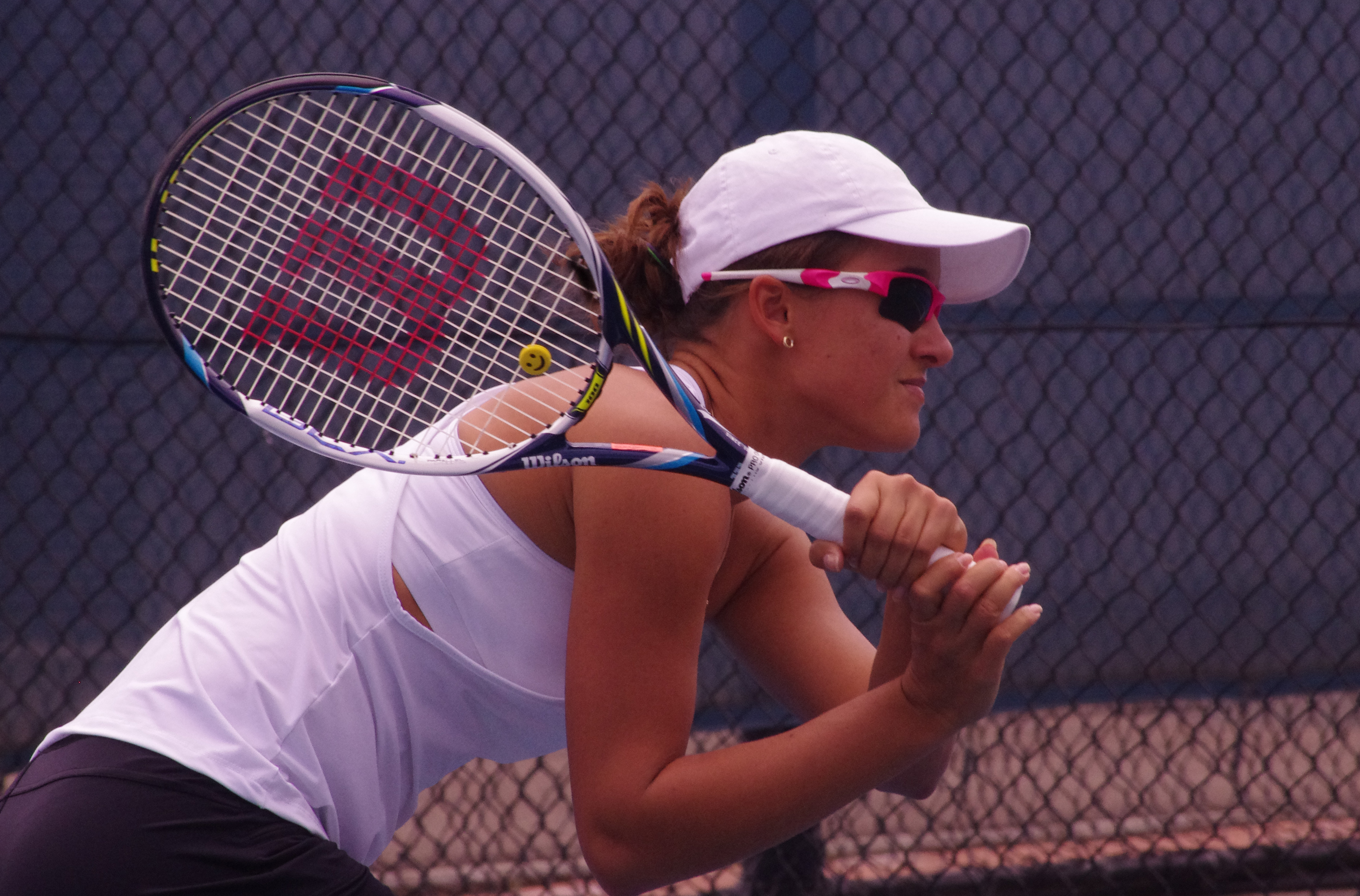
Rodionova in 2014

=== 2012 ===
In 2012, Rodionova lost in the qualifying rounds of the Sydney International and the Australian Open. She then lost in the quarterfinals of the $25k Burnie International. She then competed in two more ITF events – losing in the second and first round, respectively. She picked up form in ITF Mildura, reaching the semifinals. Rodionova then competed in three more tournaments, losing in the second round of all three. She then failed to qualify for the Danish Open. Her best result of the year came at the WTA Tour clay-court event Morocco Open. She defeated Darija Jurak, Karolína Plíšková, and world No. 108, Mathilde Johansson, to qualify for the main draw. Each match lasted three sets. She took on Timea Bacsinszky in the first round, started well by winning the first set 6–2, but was forced to retire due a severe wrist injury she sustained while trailing 0–4 in the second set. She was also forced to withdraw from the doubles competition, where she and Anastasia were the No. 1 seeds. She missed a big part of the clay-court season to recover from the injury. Rodionova returned in July; she only made it past the first round in one of five ITF tournaments. However, she had a great result in Las Vegas where she reached the semifinals. Following three more early exits, she reached the final of a $25k event in Traralgon, and followed this up by winning her next tournament in Bendigo. She finished the year with two more early-round losses in Toyota and Dubai.

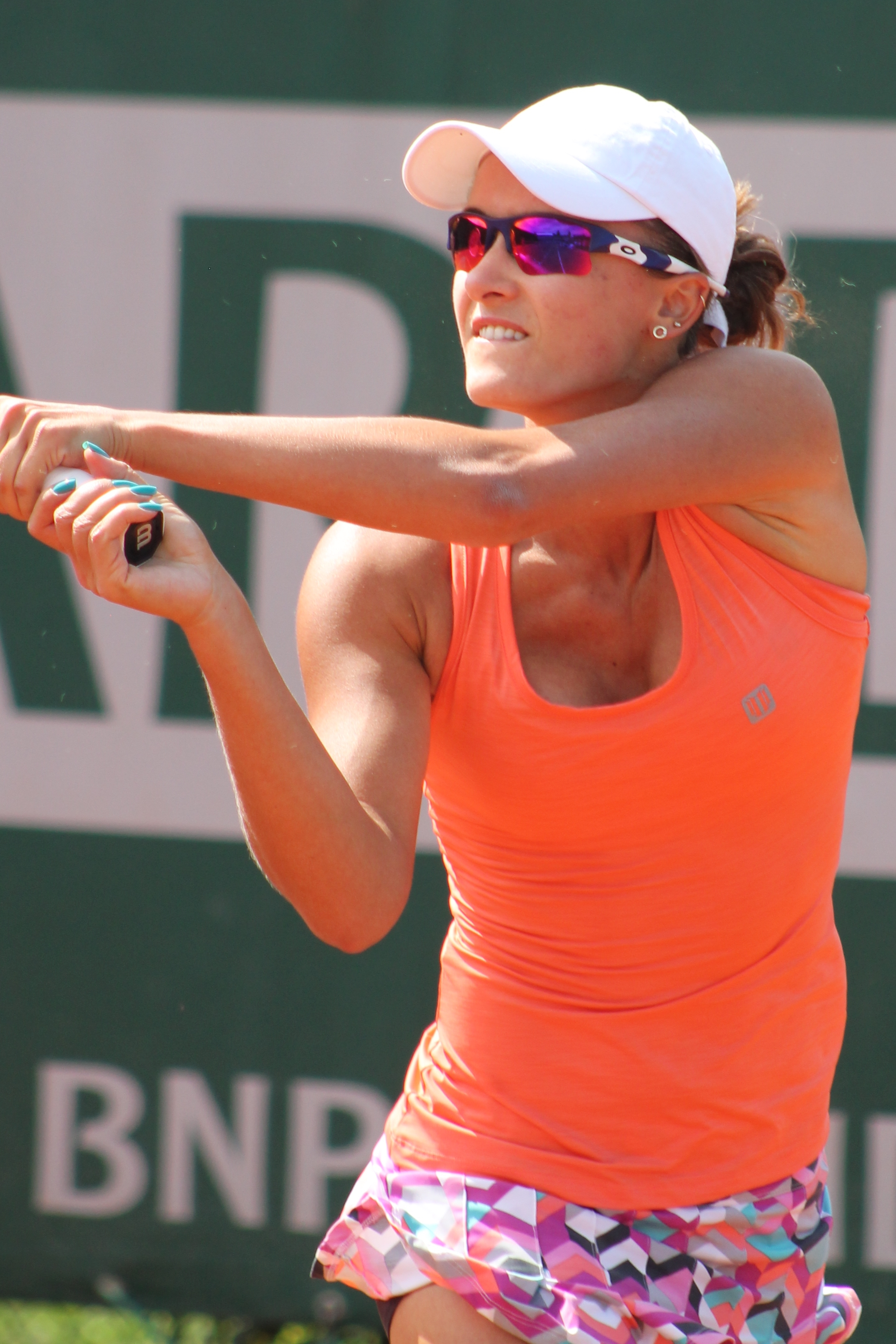
Rodionova at the 2015 French Open

=== 2024: Australian No. 1, oldest woman to make top 100 ===
Following the 2024 Australian Open, she climbed to No. 101 in the rankings, 20 years after her professional debut. With a win over Yuan Yue in Hua Hin, Thailand, she reached No. 97 in the singles rankings, on 5 February 2024, becoming the oldest woman to make a top 100 debut at 34 years old. She went one step further to reach her second career quarterfinal defeating another Chinese player, Bai Zhuoxuan.

She qualified for the main draw of the 2024 US Open, but lost in the first round against Wang Xinyu in three sets.

== World TeamTennis ==
Rodionova has played six seasons of World TeamTennis. In 2011, Rodionova was drafted by the Washington Kastles WTT Team, coached by Murphy Jensen. As a result of their 14-match win undefeated regular season, the Kastles secured the top seed in the Conference Championships where they beat the Boston Lobsters. In the WTT Finals, the Kastles defeated the St. Louis Aces to capture the 2011 WTT Championship for the second time in its four-year existence, completing the first ever 16–0 season in WTT 36-year history. Rodionova was named "Female Rookie of the Year" just prior to the Championship match and later WTT Finals MVP. She continued to play for the Kastles from 2012 to 2015, and joined the San Diego Aviators for a season in 2019. It was announced, she would be joining the Washington Kastles during the 2020 WTT season.

== Personal life ==
Arina Rodionova was born to Ivan and Natalia Rodionova and lives in Melbourne with her sister Anastasia. She began playing tennis aged three, "I began playing tennis when I was almost three years old. And why exactly tennis? There wasn't any choice for me with my dad being a coach and my sister a professional tennis player, but in the end I think it's worked well!" Rodionova cites Martina Hingis as her role model, and also admires Justine Henin and Bob and Mike Bryan. She prefers hardcourts and forehand as a shot.

Rodionova received Australian citizenship in January 2014 and married Australian rules footballer, Ty Vickery, in December 2015. The couple announced their divorce in 2025.

== Grand Slam performance timelines ==
Key
W	F	SF	QF	#R	RR	Q#	P#	DNQ	A	Z#	PO	G	S	B	NMS	NTI	P	NH

(W) winner; (F) finalist; (SF) semifinalist; (QF) quarterfinalist; (#R) rounds 4, 3, 2, 1; (RR) round-robin stage; (Q#) qualification round; (P#) preliminary round; (DNQ) did not qualify; (A) absent; (Z#) Davis/Fed Cup Zonal Group (with number indication) or (PO) play-off; (G) gold, (S) silver or (B) bronze Olympic/Paralympic medal; (NMS) not a Masters tournament; (NTI) not a Tier I tournament; (P) postponed; (NH) not held; (SR) strike rate (events won / competed); (W–L) win–loss record.
To avoid confusion and double counting, these charts are updated at the conclusion of a tournament or when the player's participation has ended.

=== Singles ===
Tournament	2008	2009	2010	2011	2012	2013	2014	2015	2016	2017	2018	2019	2020	2021	2022	2023	2024	2025	SR	W–L
Australian Open	Q3	A	Q2	1R	Q1	Q3	Q1	1R	Q3	1R	Q1	Q1	2R	1R	Q2	Q1	Q1	Q2	0 / 5	1–5
French Open	A	A	Q2	Q1	A	A	A	A	1R	Q1	Q1	Q1	Q2	Q1	Q2	Q2	Q1	Q1	0 / 1	0–1
Wimbledon	A	A	Q1	Q3	A	A	A	A	A	2R	Q2	1R	NH	Q3	A	Q1	Q2	Q2	0 / 2	1–2
US Open	Q1	A	Q3	Q1	A	Q1	Q2	A	Q2	2R	Q2	Q2	1R	Q1	A	Q1	1R	Q1	0 / 3	1–3
Win–Loss	0–0	0–0	0–0	0–1	0–0	0–0	0–0	0–1	0–1	2–3	0–0	0–1	1–2	0–1	0–0	0–0	0–1	0–0	0 / 11	3–11

=== Doubles ===
Tournament	2010	2011	2012	2013	2014	2015	2016	2017	2018	2019	2020	2021	2022	2023	2024	2026	SR	W–L
Australian Open	A	A	2R	1R	1R	2R	QF	1R	1R	1R	2R	2R	1R	1R	2R	2R	0 / 14	9–14
French Open	1R	A	A	A	A	3R	1R	A	A	A	A	1R	1R	A	A	A	0 / 5	2–5
Wimbledon	1R	2R	A	A	2R	2R	A	1R	2R	2R	NH	2R	A	A	A	A	0 / 8	6–8
US Open	1R	A	A	A	A	1R	1R	1R	A	A	1R	3R	A	A	A	A	0 / 6	2–6
Win–Loss	0–3	1–1	1–1	0–1	1–2	4–4	3–3	0–3	1–2	1–2	1–2	4–4	0–2	0–1	1–1	1–1	0 / 33	19–33

== WTA Tour finals ==
=== Doubles: 7 (1 title, 6 runner-ups) ===
Legend
WTA 250 (1–6)

Result	W–L	Date	Tournament	Tier	Surface	Partner	Opponents	Score
Loss	0–1	Feb 2010	Malaysian Open, Malaysia	International (Note: The WTA International tournaments were reclassified as WTA 250 tournaments in 2021.)	Hard (i)	(Australia) Anastasia Rodionova	(Chinese Taipei) Chan Yung-jan (China) Zheng Jie	7–6^{(7–4)}, 2–6, [7–10]
Loss	0–2	Sep 2014	Hong Kong Open, China SAR	International	Hard	(Austria) Patricia Mayr-Achleitner	(Czech Republic) Karolína Plíšková (Czech Republic) Kristýna Plíšková	2–6, 6–2, [10–12]
Loss	0–3	Mar 2015	Monterrey Open, Mexico	International	Hard	(Australia) Anastasia Rodionova	(Canada) Gabriela Dabrowski (Poland) Alicja Rosolska	3–6, 6–2, [3–10]
Loss	0–4	Feb 2017	Hungarian Ladies Open, Hungary	International	Hard (i)	(Kazakhstan) Galina Voskoboeva	(Chinese Taipei) Hsieh Su-wei (Georgia (country)) Oksana Kalashnikova	3–6, 6–4, [4–10]
Loss	0–5	Jul 2017	Jiangxi International, China	International	Hard	(Russia) Alla Kudryavtseva	(China) Jiang Xinyu (China) Tang Qianhui	3–6, 2–6
Loss	0–6	Jun 2019	Nottingham Open, UK	International	Grass	(Australia) Ellen Perez	(United States) Desirae Krawczyk (Mexico) Giuliana Olmos	6–7^{(5–7)}, 5–7
Win	1–6	Feb 2020	Hua Hin Championships, Thailand	International	Hard	(Australia) Storm Sanders	(Austria) Barbara Haas (Australia) Ellen Perez	6–3, 6–3

== WTA 125 finals ==
=== Doubles: 1 (title) ===
Result	W–L	Date	Tournament	Surface	Partner	Opponents	Score
Win	1–0	Nov 2014	Ningbo International, China	Hard	(Ukraine) Olga Savchuk	(China) Han Xinyun (China) Zhang Kailin	4–6, 7–6^{(7–2)}, [10–6]

== ITF Circuit finals ==
=== Singles: 36 (17 titles, 19 runner-ups) ===
Legend
$100,000 tournaments (0–3)
$40/50,000 tournaments (0–2)
$50/60,000 tournaments (3–6)
$25,000 tournaments (12–8)
$10,000 tournaments (2–0)

Result	W–L	Date	Tournament	Tier	Surface	Opponent	Score
Win	1–0	Apr 2005	ITF Minsk, Belarus	10,000	Carpet (i)	(Belarus) Aleksandra Malyarchikova	6–0, 6–2
Win	2–0	Aug 2006	ITF Moscow, Russia	10,000	Clay	(Russia) Yuliya Kalabina	3–6, 6–2, 6–1
Loss	2–1	Jun 2008	ITF Istanbul, Turkey	25,000	Hard	(Germany) Stephanie Gehrlein	2–6, 3–6
Win	3–1	May 2009	ITF Moscow, Russia	25,000	Clay	(Russia) Anastasia Poltoratskaya	7–6^{(4)}, 6–4
Win	4–1	Jun 2009	ITF Bukhara, Uzbekistan	25,000	Hard	(Austria) Nikola Hofmanova	6–3, 6–2
Win	5–1	Feb 2010	Burnie International, Australia	25,000	Hard	(Australia) Jarmila Gajdošová	6–1, 6–0
Loss	5–2	Oct 2012	ITF Traralgon, Australia	25,000	Hard	(Australia) Ashleigh Barty	2–6, 3–6
Win	6–2	Nov 2012	Bendigo International, Australia	25,000	Hard	(Australia) Olivia Rogowska	6–4, 7–5
Win	7–2	Oct 2013	ITF Perth, Australia	25,000	Hard	(United States) Irina Falconi	7–5, 6–4
Loss	7–3	May 2014	ITF Karuizawa, Japan	25,000	Grass	(South Korea) Jang Su-jeong	3–6, 4–6
Win	8–3	Feb 2016	ITF Perth, Australia	25,000	Hard	(Belarus) Aryna Sabalenka	6–1, 6–1
Loss	8–4	Feb 2016	ITF Port Pirie, Australia	25,000	Hard	(Austria) Barbara Haas	4–6, 7–5, 4–6
Loss	8–5	Jul 2016	Lexington Open, United States	50,000	Hard	(Netherlands) Michaëlla Krajicek	0–6, 6–2, 2–6
Loss	8–6	Feb 2017	Burnie International, Australia	50,000	Hard	(United States) Asia Muhammad	2–6, 1–6
Win	9–6	Apr 2018	ITF Óbidos, Portugal	25,000	Carpet	(Turkey) Pemra Özgen	6–3, 6–2
Loss	9–7	Jul 2018	Challenger de Granby, Canada	60,000	Hard	(Israel) Julia Glushko	4–6, 3–6
Loss	9–8	Jun 2019	ITF Santa Margarida de Montbui, Spain	W25	Hard	(Bulgaria) Elitsa Kostova	5–7, 3–6
Loss	9–9	Nov 2019	Liuzhou Open, China	W60	Hard	(China) Zhu Lin	6–2, 0–6, 1–6
Loss	9–10	Jun 2021	Nottingham Trophy, United Kingdom	W100	Grass	(Belgium) Alison Van Uytvanck	0–6, 4–6
Loss	9–11	Feb 2022	ITF Canberra, Australia	W25	Hard	(United States) Asia Muhammad	1–6, 6–7^{(7)}
Loss	9–12	Jun 2022	Surbiton Trophy, UK	W100	Grass	(Belgium) Alison Van Uytvanck	6–7^{(3)}, 2–6
Win	10–12	Feb 2023	ITF Swan Hill, Australia	W25	Grass	(Australia) Maddison Inglis	6–4, 6–3
Win	11–12	Apr 2023	ITF Nottingham, UK	W25	Hard	(Netherlands) Arianne Hartono	6–2, 6–1
Win	12–12	Apr 2023	ITF Nottingham, UK	W25	Hard	(United Kingdom) Amarni Banks	6–4, 4–6, 6–2
Loss	12–13	Jun 2023	ITF Montemor-o-Novo, Portugal	W40	Hard	(Australia) Olivia Gadecki	3–6, 2–6
Loss	12–14	Jul 2023	ITF Cantanhede, Portugal	W25	Carpet	(Australia) Kimberly Birrell	6–4, 3–6, 1–6
Win	13–14	Aug 2023	ITF Barcelona, Spain	W60	Hard	Valeria Savinykh	6–4, 5–7, 6–1
Loss	13–15	Aug 2023	ITF Roehampton, UK	W25	Hard	(Philippines) Alex Eala	2–6, 3–6
Win	14–15	Oct 2023	ITF Edmonton, Canada	W25	Hard (i)	(Netherlands) Lesley Pattinama Kerkhove	6–3, 7–5
Win	15–15	Nov 2023	ITF Lousada, Portugal	W25	Hard (i)	(United States) Robin Anderson	1–6, 6–3, 6–4
Win	16–15	Dec 2023	Trnava Indoor, Slovakia	W60	Hard (i)	(France) Kristina Mladenovic	7–6^{(1)}, 5–7, 6–1
Loss	16–16	Apr 2024	Kangaroo Cup, Japan	W100	Hard	(Japan) Moyuka Uchijima	3–6, 3–6
Loss	16–17	May 2024	Kurume Cup, Japan	W75	Carpet	(United States) Emina Bektas	6–7^{(7)}, 6–3, 3–6
Loss	16–18	Feb 2025	ITF Ahmedabad, India	W50	Hard	(South Korea) Park So-hyun	3–6, 0–6
Win	17–18	Mar 2025	Jin'an Open, China	W75	Hard	(Thailand) Lanlana Tararudee	6–3, 1–6, 6–3
Loss	17–19	May 2025	ITF Indian Harbour Beach, US	W50	Clay	(Bulgaria) Lia Karatancheva	2–6, 7–6^{(6)}, 3–6

=== Doubles: 56 (42 titles, 14 runner-ups) ===
Legend
$100,000 tournaments (0–3)
$75/80,000 tournaments (2–0)
$50/60,000 tournaments (18–4)
$25,000 tournaments (21–7)
$10,000 tournaments (1–0)

Result	W–L	Date	Tournament	Tier	Surface	Partner	Opponents	Score
Win	1–0	Apr 2006	ITF Putignano, Italy	25,000	Hard	(Australia) Anastasia Rodionova	(Croatia) Ivana Abramović (Croatia) Maria Abramović	1–6, 6–1, 7–5
Win	2–0	Aug 2006	ITF Moscow, Russia	10,000	Clay	(Russia) Anastasia Poltoratskaya	(Russia) Anastasia Pivovarova (Russia) Yulia Solonitskaya	6–0, 6–2
Win	3–0	Sep 2006	ITF Gliwice, Poland	25,000	Clay	(Ukraine) Veronika Kapshay	(Germany) Carmen Klaschka (Germany) Justine Ozga	6–4, 7–5
Loss	3–1	Mar 2007	ITF Moscow, Russia	25,000	Hard (i)	(Belarus) Ekaterina Dzehalevich	(Russia) Alisa Kleybanova (Russia) Evgeniya Rodina	6–7^{(2)}, 0–6
Loss	3–2	May 2007	ITF Warsaw, Poland	25,000	Clay	(Poland) Karolina Kosińska	(Croatia) Josipa Bek (Bosnia and Herzegovina) Sandra Martinović	2–6, 6–3, 2–6
Win	4–2	Jul 2007	ITF Dnipropetrovsk, Ukraine	50,000	Clay	(Kazakhstan) Amina Rakhim	(Croatia) Ivana Abramović (Croatia) Maria Abramović	7–5, 4–6, 6–2
Win	5–2	Oct 2007	ITF Podolsk, Russia	25,000	Hard (i)	(Russia) Vasilisa Davydova	(Russia) Nina Bratchikova (Russia) Anastasia Poltoratskaya	6–3, 6–0
Win	6–2	Apr 2009	ITF Jackson, United States	25,000	Clay	(Australia) Monique Adamczak	(United States) Laura Granville (United States) Riza Zalameda	6–3, 6–4
Win	7–2	May 2009	ITF Moscow, Russia	25,000	Clay	(Russia) Maria Kondratieva	(Russia) Yuliya Kalabina (Russia) Marta Sirotkina	7–5, 6–1
Loss	7–3	Jun 2009	ITF Bukhara, Uzbekistan	25,000	Hard	(Kyrgyzstan) Ksenia Palkina	(Sweden) Anna Brazhnikova (Russia) Marta Sirotkina	6–3, 4–6, [9–11]
Win	8–3	Aug 2009	ITF Moscow, Russia	25,000	Clay	(Russia) Ekaterina Lopes	(Ukraine) Veronika Kapshay (Austria) Melanie Klaffner	6–2, 6–2
Win	9–3	Aug 2009	ITF Moscow, Russia	25,000	Clay	(Russia) Ekaterina Lopes	(Russia) Valeria Savinykh (Russia) Marina Shamayko	6–3, 6–3
Win	10–3	Oct 2009	ITF Granada, Spain	25,000	Hard	(Russia) Nina Bratchikova	(Argentina) Betina Jozami (Russia) Valeria Savinykh	6–1, 3–6, [10–6]
Loss	10–4	Oct 2009	ITF Villa de Madrid, Spain	50,000	Clay	(Russia) Ekaterina Lopes	(Belarus) Darya Kustova (Czech Republic) Renata Voráčová	2–6, 2–6
Loss	10–5	Nov 2009	Bratislava Open, Slovakia	50,000	Hard (i)	(Belarus) Tatiana Poutchek	(Sweden) Sofia Arvidsson (Netherlands) Michaëlla Krajicek	3–6, 4–6
Win	11–5	Dec 2009	Bendigo International, Australia	25,000	Hard	(France) Irena Pavlovic	(United Kingdom) Jocelyn Rae (Australia) Emelyn Starr	6–3, 7–6^{(3)}
Win	12–5	Feb 2010	Burnie International, Australia	25,000	Hard	(Australia) Jessica Moore	(Hungary) Tímea Babos (Russia) Anna Arina Marenko	6–1, 6–4
Loss	12–6	Mar 2011	ITF Clearwater, United States	25,000	Hard	(Canada) Heidi El Tabakh	(United States) Kimberly Couts (Latvia) Līga Dekmeijere	1–6, 4–6
Win	13–6	May 2011	Prague Open, Czech Republic	50,000	Clay	(Belarus) Darya Kustova	(Ukraine) Olga Savchuk (Ukraine) Lesia Tsurenko	2–6, 6–1, 7–5
Win	14–6	Feb 2012	Burnie International, Australia	25,000	Hard	(United Kingdom) Melanie South	(Australia) Stephanie Bengson (Australia) Tyra Calderwood	6–2, 6–2
Win	15–6	Feb 2012	ITF Sydney, Australia	25,000	Hard	(United Kingdom) Melanie South	(China) Duan Yingying (China) Han Xinyun	3–6, 6–3, [10–8]
Win	16–6	Aug 2012	ITF Moscow, Russia	25,000	Clay	(Russia) Valeria Solovyeva	(Russia) Eugeniya Pashkova (Ukraine) Anastasiya Vasylyeva	6–3, 6–3
Loss	16–7	Aug 2012	ITF Prague, Czech Republic	25,000	Clay	(Russia) Anastasia Pivovarova	(Czech Republic) Jesika Malečková (Czech Republic) Tereza Smitková	1–6, 4–6
Win	17–7	Sep 2012	Las Vegas Open, United States	50,000	Hard	(Australia) Anastasia Rodionova	(Russia) Elena Bovina (Romania) Edina Gallovits-Hall	6–2, 2–6, [10–6]
Win	18–7	Oct 2012	ITF Troy, United States	25,000	Hard	(Russia) Angelina Gabueva	(Canada) Sharon Fichman (Canada) Marie-Ève Pelletier	6–4, 6–4
Win	19–7	Oct 2012	ITF Traralgon, Australia	25,000	Hard	(Zimbabwe) Cara Black	(Australia) Ashleigh Barty (Australia) Sally Peers	2–6, 7–6^{(4)}, [10–8]
Loss	19–8	Nov 2012	Bendigo International, Australia	25,000	Hard	(Zimbabwe) Cara Black	(Australia) Ashleigh Barty (Australia) Sally Peers	6–7^{(12)}, 6–7^{(5)}
Win	20–8	Apr 2013	ITF Pelham, United States	25,000	Clay	(Australia) Ashleigh Barty	(Chinese Taipei) Kao Shao-yuan (Chinese Taipei) Lee Hua-chen	6–4, 6–2
Win	21–8	Oct 2013	ITF Margaret River, Australia	25,000	Hard	(Thailand) Noppawan Lertcheewakarn	(Australia) Monique Adamczak (Australia) Tammi Patterson	6–2, 3–6, [10–8]
Win	22–8	May 2014	Kangaroo Cup Gifu, Japan	75,000	Hard	(Australia) Jarmila Wolfe	(Japan) Misaki Doi (Chinese Taipei) Hsieh Shu-ying	6–3, 6–3
Win	23–8	May 2014	Kurume Cup, Japan	50,000	Grass	(Australia) Jarmila Wolfe	(Japan) Junri Namigata (Japan) Akiko Yonemura	6–4, 6–2
Win	24–8	Jun 2014	Nottingham Open, UK	50,000	Grass	(Australia) Jarmila Wolfe	(Paraguay) Verónica Cepede Royg (Liechtenstein) Stephanie Vogt	7–6^{(0)}, 6–1
Win	25–8	Mar 2016	Clay Court International, Australia	25,000	Clay	(Australia) Ashleigh Barty	(Japan) Kanae Hisami (Thailand) Varatchaya Wongteanchai	6–4, 6–2
Win	26–8	Mar 2016	ITF Canberra, Australia	25,000	Clay	(Australia) Ashleigh Barty	(Japan) Eri Hozumi (Japan) Miyu Kato	5–7, 6–3, [10–7]
Win	27–8	May 2016	Nana Trophy Tunis, Tunisia	50,000	Clay	(Ukraine) Valeriya Strakhova	(Russia) Irina Khromacheva (Turkey) İpek Soylu	6–1, 6–2
Win	28–8	Oct 2016	Bendigo International, Australia	50,000	Hard	(United States) Asia Muhammad	(Japan) Shuko Aoyama (Japan) Risa Ozaki	6–4, 6–3
Win	29–8	Nov 2017	Canberra International, Australia	60,000	Hard	(United States) Asia Muhammad	(Australia) Jessica Moore (Australia) Ellen Perez	6–4, 6–4
Loss	29–9	Nov 2017	Bendigo International, Australia	60,000	Hard	(United States) Asia Muhammad	(Australia) Alison Bai (Australia) Zoe Hives	6–4, 4–6, [8–10]
Loss	29–10	Jun 2018	Surbiton Trophy, UK	100,000	Grass	(Belgium) Yanina Wickmayer	(Australia) Ellen Perez (Australia) Jessica Moore	6–4, 5–7, [3–10]
Win	30–10	Jul 2018	Challenger de Granby, Canada	60,000	Hard	(Australia) Ellen Perez	(Japan) Erika Sema (Japan) Aiko Yoshitomi	7–5, 6–4
Win	31–10	Aug 2018	Landisville Tennis Challenge, US	60,000	Hard	(Australia) Ellen Perez	(Chinese Taipei) Chen Pei-hsuan (Chinese Taipei) Wu Fang-hsien	6–0, 6–2
Win	32–10	Oct 2018	Bendigo International, Australia	60,000	Hard	(Australia) Ellen Perez	(Japan) Eri Hozumi (Japan) Risa Ozaki	7–5, 6–1
Win	33–10	Nov 2018	Canberra International, Australia	60,000	Hard	(Australia) Ellen Perez	(Australia) Destanee Aiava (Australia) Naiktha Bains	6–7^{(5)}, 6–3, [10–7]
Win	34–10	Jan 2019	Burnie International, Australia	W60	Hard	(Australia) Ellen Perez	(Russia) Irina Khromacheva (Belgium) Maryna Zanevska	6–4, 6–3
Win	35–10	Feb 2019	GB Pro-Series Shrewsbury, UK	W60	Hard	(Belgium) Yanina Wickmayer	(United Kingdom) Freya Christie (Russia) Valeria Savinykh	6–2, 7–5
Win	36–10	May 2019	Internazionale di Roma, Italy	W60	Clay	(Australia) Storm Sanders	(Brazil) Gabriela Cé (Romania) Cristina Dinu	6–2, 6–3
Win	37–10	May 2019	Solgironès Open, Spain	W60	Clay	(Australia) Storm Sanders	(Hungary) Dalma Gálfi (Spain) Georgina Garcia Perez	6–4, 6–4
Loss	37–11	Jun 2019	Ilkley Trophy, UK	W100	Grass	(Australia) Ellen Perez	(Brazil) Beatriz Haddad Maia (Brazil) Luisa Stefani	4–6, 7–6^{(5)}, [4–10]
Loss	37–12	Mar 2020	ITF Mildura, Australia	W25	Grass	(New Zealand) Erin Routliffe	(Slovakia) Tereza Mihalíková (Australia) Abbie Myers	3–6, 2–6
Win	38–12	May 2021	Charlottesville Open, US	W60	Clay	(Kazakhstan) Anna Danilina	(New Zealand) Erin Routliffe (Indonesia) Aldila Sutjiadi	6–1, 6–3
Win	39–12	Oct 2021	ITF Les Franqueses del Vallès, Spain	W80+H	Hard	(Russia) Irina Khromacheva	(Switzerland) Susan Bandecchi (United Kingdom) Eden Silva	2–6, 6–3, [10–6]
Win	40–12	Feb 2022	ITF Canberra, Australia	W25	Hard	(United States) Asia Muhammad	(New Zealand) Alison Bai (Australia) Jaimee Fourlis	6–3, 3–6, [10–6]
Win	41–12	Feb 2022	ITF Canberra, Australia	W25	Hard	(United States) Asia Muhammad	(New Zealand) Alison Bai (Australia) Jaimee Fourlis	7–6^{(2)}, 7–6^{(5)}
Win	42–12	Apr 2022	Canberra International, Australia	W60	Clay	(India) Ankita Raina	(Mexico) Fernanda Contreras Gómez (Australia) Alana Parnaby	4–6, 6–2, [11–9]
Loss	42–13	Feb 2023	Burnie International, Australia	W60	Hard	(Japan) Ena Shibahara	(Japan) Mai Hontama (Japan) Eri Hozumi	6–4, 3–6, [6–10]
Loss	42–14	Mar 2024	ITF Tokyo Open, Japan	W100	Hard	(Serbia) Aleksandra Krunić	(South Korea) Jang Su-jeong (Australia) Kimberly Birrell	5–7, 3–6, [8–10]

=== Junior Grand Slam tournament finals ===
==== Doubles: 1 (title) ====
Result	Year	Tournament	Surface	Partner	Opponents	Score
Win	2007	Australian Open	Hard	(Russia) Evgeniya Rodina	(United States) Julia Cohen (Poland) Urszula Radwańska	2–6, 6–3, 6–1
