= Taylor Townsend career statistics =

American tennis player career statistics

Career finals
Discipline	Type	Won	Lost	Total
Singles	Grand Slam	–	–	–
Singles	WTA Finals	–	–	–
Singles	WTA 1000	–	–	–
Singles	WTA 500	–	–	–
Singles	WTA 250	0	1	1
Singles	Total	0	1	1
Doubles	Grand Slam	4	3	7
Doubles	WTA Finals	1	1	2
Doubles	WTA 1000	5	2	7
Doubles	WTA 500	5	0	5
Doubles	WTA 250	3	2	5
Doubles	Total	18	8	26
Mixed	Grand Slam	0	2	2
Mixed	Total	0	2	2

This is a list of the main career statistics of professional American tennis player Taylor Townsend.

== Performance timelines ==
Key
W	F	SF	QF	#R	RR	Q#	P#	DNQ	A	Z#	PO	G	S	B	NMS	NTI	P	NH

(W) winner; (F) finalist; (SF) semifinalist; (QF) quarterfinalist; (#R) rounds 4, 3, 2, 1; (RR) round-robin stage; (Q#) qualification round; (P#) preliminary round; (DNQ) did not qualify; (A) absent; (Z#) Davis/Fed Cup Zonal Group (with number indication) or (PO) play-off; (G) gold, (S) silver or (B) bronze Olympic/Paralympic medal; (NMS) not a Masters tournament; (NTI) not a Tier I tournament; (P) postponed; (NH) not held; (SR) strike rate (events won / competed); (W–L) win–loss record.
To avoid confusion and double counting, these charts are updated at the conclusion of a tournament or when the player's participation has ended.

Only main-draw results in WTA Tour, Grand Slam tournaments and Billie Jean King Cup are included in win–loss records.

=== Singles ===
Current through the 2026 WTA Tour.

Tournament	2011	2012	2013	2014	2015	2016	2017	2018	2019	2020	2021	2022	2023	2024	2025	2026	SR	W–L	Win %
Grand Slam tournaments
Australian Open	A	A	A	A	1R	A	Q3	1R	1R	2R	A	A	2R	1R	1R	1R	0 / 8	2–8	20%
French Open	A	A	A	3R	1R	2R	2R	2R	1R	A	A	1R	1R	A	1R	1R	0 / 10	5–10	33%
Wimbledon	A	A	A	1R	A	Q2	Q1	2R	2R	NH	A	A	Q3	1R	1R	1R	0 / 6	2–6	25%
US Open	Q2	A	Q3	1R	Q2	1R	1R	2R	4R	1R	A	1R	3R	2R	4R	4R	0 / 11	13–11	54%
Win–loss	0–0	0–0	0–0	2–3	0–2	1–2	1–2	3–4	4–4	1–2	0–0	0–2	3–3	1–3	3–4	3–4	0 / 35	22–35	39%
National representation
BJK Cup	A	A	A	A	G2	A	A	A	A	A	A	RR	RR	1R	SF	PO	0 / 4	1–0	100%
WTA 1000 tournaments
Qatar Open	NTI	A	A	A	NTI	A	NTI	A	NTI	A	NTI	A	NTI	A	Q1	A	0 / 0	0–0	–
Dubai Open	A	NTI			A	NTI	A	NTI	A	NTI	A	NTI	A	A	Q1	A	0 / 0	0–0	–
Indian Wells Open	A	A	2R	2R	2R	1R	1R	1R	1R	NH	A	A	Q1	2R	Q2	2R	0 / 9	5–9	36%
Miami Open	A	A	A	A	A	A	3R	Q1	2R	NH	A	A	2R	3R	3R	2R	0 / 6	9–6	60%
Madrid Open	A	A	A	A	A	A	A	A	A	NH	A	A	Q2	1R	A	1R	0 / 2	0–2	0%
Italian Open	A	A	A	A	A	A	A	A	A	A	A	A	3R	1R	A	3R	0 / 3	4–3	57%
Canadian Open	A	A	A	A	A	A	A	A	A	NH	A	A	A	QF	A	3R	0 / 2	5–2	71%
Cincinnati Open	A	A	A	2R	Q1	A	2R	A	A	Q1	A	1R	Q2	3R	3R	2R	0 / 6	7–6	54%
China Open	A	A	A	A	A	A	A	A	A	NH			A	2R	A	A	0 / 1	1–1	50%
Guadalajara Open	NH											A	3R	NTI			0 / 1	2–1	67%
Win–loss	0–0	0–0	1–1	2–2	1–1	0–1	3–3	0–1	1–2	0–0	0–0	0–1	5–3	9–7	4–2	7–6	0 / 30	33–30	52%
Career statistics
	2011	2012	2013	2014	2015	2016	2017	2018	2019	2020	2021	2022	2023	2024	2025	2026	SR	W–L	Win %
Tournaments	0	0	3	6	5	3	7	7	8	3	0	4	7	16	8	12	Career total: 89		
Titles	0	0	0	0	0	0	0	0	0	0	0	0	0	0	0	0	Career total: 0		
Finals	0	0	0	0	0	0	0	0	0	0	0	0	0	0	0	1	Career total: 1		
Hard win–loss	0–0	0–0	1–2	3–4	2–4	0–2	4–5	2–4	4–5	1–3	0–0	1–3	6–5	14–10	9–6	13–7	0 / 61	60–60	50%
Clay win–loss	0–0	0–0	0–1	2–1	0–1	1–1	1–1	2–2	2–2	0–0	0–0	0–1	2–2	2–4	0–1	2–3	0 / 20	14–20	41%
Grass win–loss	0–0	0–0	0–0	0–1	0–0	0–0	0–0	1–1	1–1	0–0	0–0	0–0	0–0	0–2	0–1	0–1	0 / 7	2–7	22%
Carpet win–loss	0–0	0–0	0–0	0–0	0–0	0–0	0–1	0–0	discontinued								0 / 1	0–1	0%
Overall win–loss	0–0	0–0	1–3	5–6	2–5	1–3	5–7	5–7	7–8	1–3	0–0	1–4	8–7	16–16	9–8	15–11	0 / 89	76–88	46%
Year-end ranking	428	676	308	102	304	132	105	74	84	89	293	131	80	69	119	93			

=== Doubles ===
Current through the 2026 WTA Finals.

Tournament	2011	2012	2013	2014	2015	2016	2017	2018	2019	2020	2021	2022	2023	2024	2025	2026	SR	W–L	Win %
Grand Slam tournaments
Australian Open	A	A	A	A	A	A	1R	1R	3R	2R	A	A	2R	3R	W	QF	1 / 8	14–7	67%
French Open	A	A	A	A	A	A	1R	2R	1R	A	A	SF	F	A	QF	W	1 / 7	19–6	76%
Wimbledon	A	A	A	A	A	Q2	1R	A	1R	NH	A	A	2R	W	SF	QF	1 / 6	14–5	74%
US Open	3R	A	1R	1R	2R	QF	1R	1R	2R	SF	A	F	QF	SF	F	W	1/ 14	32–13	71%
Win–loss	2–1	0–0	0–1	0–1	1–1	3–1	0–4	1–3	3–4	4–2	0–0	9–2	10–4	11–2	18–3	17–2	4 / 35	79–31	72%
Year-end championships
WTA Finals	DNQ									NH	DNQ			F	SF	W	1 / 3	11–3	79%
National representation
BJK Cup	A	A	A	A	G2	A	A	A	A	A	A	RR	RR	1R	SF	PO	0 / 4	6–2	75%
WTA 1000 tournaments
Dubai Open	A	NTI			A	NTI	A	NTI	A	NTI	A	NTI	A	A	W	A	1 / 1	3–0	100%
Indian Wells Open	A	A	A	A	2R	A	A	A	A	NH	A	A	2R	QF	SF	W	1 / 5	12–3	80%
Miami Open	A	A	A	A	A	A	1R	A	A	NH	A	A	F	1R	SF	W	1 / 5	12–4	75%
Madrid Open	A	A	A	A	A	A	A	A	A	NH	A	A	SF	QF	A	W	1 / 3	10–2	83%
Italian Open	A	A	A	A	A	A	A	A	A	A	A	A	A	QF	A	SF	0 / 2	4–2	67%
Canadian Open	A	A	A	A	A	A	A	A	A	NH	A	A	A	2R	F	A	0 / 2	5–2	71%
Cincinnati Open	A	A	A	2R	A	A	A	A	A	2R	A	1R	W	QF	1R	2R	1 / 7	9–6	60%
China Open	A	A	A	A	A	A	A	A	A	NH			A	1R	A	A	0 / 1	0–1	0%
Guadalajara Open	NH											A	QF	NTI			0 / 1	1–1	50%
Win–loss	0–0	0–0	0–0	1–1	1–0	0–0	0–1	0–0	0–0	1–1	0–0	0–1	14–4	8–7	13–4	18–2	5 / 27	56–21	73%
Career statistics
	2011	2012	2013	2014	2015	2016	2017	2018	2019	2020	2021	2022	2023	2024	2025	2026	SR	W–L	Win %
Tournaments	1	0	3	4	5	2	9	3	5	4	0	4	12	15	14	11	Career total: 92		
Titles	0	0	0	0	0	0	0	0	0	1	0	0	3	3	4	7	Career total: 18		
Finals	0	0	1	0	0	0	0	0	1	1	0	1	5	4	6	7	Career total: 26		
Overall win–loss	2–1	0–0	3–3	2–3	6–3	4–2	2–9	1–3	6–5	9–3	0–0	10–4	34–10	30–13	44–10	44–5	18 / 92	197–74	73%
Win %	67%	–	50%	40%	67%	67%	18%	25%	55%	75%	–	71%	77%	70%	81%	90%	Career total: 73%		
Year-end ranking	234	546	190	156	124	73	150	153	89	67	134	33	7	5	2	2			

=== Mixed doubles ===
Tournament	2011	2012	2013	2014	2015	2016	2017	2018	2019	2020	2021	2022	2023	2024	2025	2026	SR	W–L	Win %
Grand Slam tournaments
Australian Open	A	A	A	A	A	A	A	A	A	A	A	A	QF	1R	2R	SF	0 / 4	6–3	67%
French Open	A	A	A	A	A	A	A	A	A	NH	A	A	2R	A	F	A	0 / 2	5–1	83%
Wimbledon	A	A	A	A	A	A	A	A	A	NH	A	A	2R	QF	2R	A	0 / 3	4–3	57%
US Open	1R	A	A	SF	2R	1R	A	1R	A	NH	A	A	SF	F	QF	1R	0 / 9	12–9	57%
Win–loss	0–1	0–0	0–0	3–1	1–1	0–1	0–0	0–1	0–0	0–0	0–0	0–0	7–3	6–3	7–3	3–2	0 / 18	27–16	63%
WTA 1000 tournaments
Indian Wells Open	NH													SF	A	A	0 / 1	1–1	50%

== Grand Slam tournaments finals ==
=== Doubles: 7 (4 titles, 3 runner-ups) ===
Result	Year	Tournament	Surface	Partner	Opponents	Score
Loss	2022	US Open	Hard	(United States) Caty McNally	(Czech Republic) Barbora Krejčíková (Czech Republic) Kateřina Siniaková	6–3, 5–7, 1–6
Loss	2023	French Open	Clay	(Canada) Leylah Fernandez	(Chinese Taipei) Hsieh Su-wei (China) Wang Xinyu	6–1, 6–7^{(5–7)}, 1–6
Win	2024	Wimbledon	Grass	(Czech Republic) Kateřina Siniaková	(Canada) Gabriela Dabrowski (New Zealand) Erin Routliffe	7–6^{(7–5)}, 7–6^{(7–1)}
Win	2025	Australian Open	Hard	(Czech Republic) Kateřina Siniaková	(Chinese Taipei) Hsieh Su-wei (Latvia) Jeļena Ostapenko	6–2, 6–7^{(4–7)}, 6–3
Loss	2025	US Open	Hard	(Czech Republic) Kateřina Siniaková	(Canada) Gabriela Dabrowski (New Zealand) Erin Routliffe	4–6, 4–6
Win	2026	French Open	Clay	(Czech Republic) Kateřina Siniaková	(Kazakhstan) Anna Danilina (Serbia) Aleksandra Krunić	6–2, 7–5
Win	2026	US Open	Hard	(Czech Republic) Kateřina Siniaková	(United States) Ashlyn Krueger (United States) Robin Montgomery	5–7, 6–0, 6–2

=== Mixed doubles: 2 (2 runner-ups) ===
Result	Year	Tournament	Surface	Partner	Opponents	Score
Loss	2024	US Open	Hard	(United States) Donald Young	(Italy) Sara Errani (Italy) Andrea Vavassori	6–7^{(0–7)}, 5–7
Loss	2025	French Open	Clay	(United States) Evan King	(Italy) Sara Errani (Italy) Andrea Vavassori	4–6, 2–6

== Other significant finals ==
=== Year-end championships ===
==== Doubles: 2 (1 title, 1 runner-up) ====
Result	Year	Tournament	Surface	Partner	Opponents	Score
Loss	2024	WTA Finals, Saudi Arabia	Hard (i)	(Czech Republic) Kateřina Siniaková	(Canada) Gabriela Dabrowski (New Zealand) Erin Routliffe	5–7, 3–6
Win	2026	WTA Finals, United States	Hard	(Czech Republic) Kateřina Siniaková	(Italy) Sara Errani (Italy) Jasmine Paolini	6–4, 6–3

=== WTA 1000 ===
==== Doubles: 7 (5 titles, 2 runner-ups) ====
Result	Year	Tournament	Surface	Partner	Opponents	Score
Loss	2023	Miami Open	Hard	(Canada) Leylah Fernandez	(United States) Coco Gauff (United States) Jessica Pegula	6–7^{(6–8)}, 2–6
Win	2023	Cincinnati Open	Hard	(United States) Alycia Parks	(United States) Nicole Melichar-Martinez (Australia) Ellen Perez	6–7^{(1–7)}, 6–4, [10–6]
Win	2025	Dubai Open	Hard	(Czech Republic) Kateřina Siniaková	(Chinese Taipei) Hsieh Su-wei (Latvia) Jeļena Ostapenko	7–6^{(7–5)}, 6–4
Loss	2025	Canadian Open	Hard	(China) Zhang Shuai	(United States) Coco Gauff (United States) McCartney Kessler	4–6, 6–1, [11–13]
Win	2026	Indian Wells Open	Hard	(Czech Republic) Kateřina Siniaková	(Kazakhstan) Anna Danilina (Serbia) Aleksandra Krunić	7–6^{(7–4)}, 6–4
Win	2026	Miami Open	Hard	(Czech Republic) Kateřina Siniaková	(Italy) Sara Errani (Italy) Jasmine Paolini	7–6^{(7–0)}, 6–1
Win	2026	Madrid Open	Clay	(Czech Republic) Kateřina Siniaková	Mirra Andreeva; Diana Shnaider	7–6^{(7–2)}, 6–2

== WTA Tour finals ==
=== Singles: 1 (runner-up) ===
Legend WTA 500 (0–0) WTA 250 (0–1)	Finals by surface Hard (0–1) Clay (0–0)

Result	W–L	Date	Tournament	Tier	Surface	Opponent	Score
Loss	0–1	Feb 2026	ATX Open, United States	WTA 250	Hard	(United States) Peyton Stearns	6–7^{(8–10)}, 5–7

=== Doubles: 26 (18 titles, 8 runner-ups) ===
Legend Grand Slam (4–3) WTA Finals (1–1) WTA 1000 (5–2) WTA 500 (5–0) WTA 250 / International (3–2)	Finals by surface Hard (15–7) Clay (2–1) Grass (1–0)	Finals by setting Outdoor (17–7) Indoor (1–1)

Result	W–L	Date	Tournament	Tier	Surface	Partner	Opponents	Score
Loss	0–1	Aug 2013	Washington Open, United States	International	Hard	(Canada) Eugenie Bouchard	(Japan) Shuko Aoyama (Russia) Vera Dushevina	3–6, 3–6
Loss	0–2	Jan 2019	Auckland Open, New Zealand	International	Hard	(New Zealand) Paige Hourigan	(Canada) Eugenie Bouchard (United States) Sofia Kenin	6–1, 1–6, [7–10]
Win	1–2	Jan 2020	Auckland Open, New Zealand	International	Hard	(United States) Asia Muhammad	(United States) Serena Williams (Denmark) Caroline Wozniacki	6–4, 6–4
Loss	1–3	Sep 2022	US Open, United States	Grand Slam	Hard	(United States) Caty McNally	(Czech Republic) Barbora Krejčíková (Czech Republic) Kateřina Siniaková	6–3, 5–7, 1–6
Win	2–3	Jan 2023	Adelaide International, Australia	WTA 500	Hard	(United States) Asia Muhammad	(Australia) Storm Hunter (Czech Republic) Kateřina Siniaková	6–2, 7–6^{(7–2)}
Win	3–3	Jan 2023	Adelaide International, Australia (2)	WTA 500	Hard	(Brazil) Luisa Stefani	Anastasia Pavlyuchenkova (Kazakhstan) Elena Rybakina	7–5, 7–6^{(7–3)}
Loss	3–4	Apr 2023	Miami Open, United States	WTA 1000	Hard	(Canada) Leylah Fernandez	(United States) Coco Gauff (United States) Jessica Pegula	6–7^{(6–8)}, 2–6
Loss	3–5	Jun 2023	French Open, France	Grand Slam	Clay	(Canada) Leylah Fernandez	(Chinese Taipei) Hsieh Su-wei (China) Wang Xinyu	6–1, 6–7^{(5–7)}, 1–6
Win	4–5	Aug 2023	Cincinnati Open, United States	WTA 1000	Hard	(United States) Alycia Parks	(United States) Nicole Melichar-Martinez (Australia) Ellen Perez	6–7^{(1–7)}, 6–4, [10–6]
Win	5–5	Jan 2024	Adelaide International, Australia (3)	WTA 500	Hard	(Brazil) Beatriz Haddad Maia	(France) Caroline Garcia (France) Kristina Mladenovic	7–5, 6–3
Win	6–5	Jul 2024	Wimbledon, United Kingdom	Grand Slam	Grass	(Czech Republic) Kateřina Siniaková	(Canada) Gabriela Dabrowski (New Zealand) Erin Routliffe	7–6^{(7–5)}, 7–6^{(7–1)}
Win	7–5	Aug 2024	Washington Open, United States	WTA 500	Hard	(United States) Asia Muhammad	(China) Jiang Xinyu (Chinese Taipei) Wu Fang-hsien	7–6^{(7–0)}, 6–3
Loss	7–6	Nov 2024	WTA Finals, Saudi Arabia	Finals	Hard (i)	(Czech Republic) Kateřina Siniaková	(Canada) Gabriela Dabrowski (New Zealand) Erin Routliffe	5–7, 3–6
Win	8–6	Jan 2025	Australian Open, Australia	Grand Slam	Hard	(Czech Republic) Kateřina Siniaková	(Chinese Taipei) Hsieh Su-wei (Latvia) Jeļena Ostapenko	6–2, 6–7^{(4–7)}, 6–3
Win	9–6	Feb 2025	Dubai Open, United Arab Emirates	WTA 1000	Hard	(Czech Republic) Kateřina Siniaková	(Chinese Taipei) Hsieh Su-wei (Latvia) Jeļena Ostapenko	7–6^{(7–5)}, 6–4
Win	10–6	Jul 2025	Washington Open, United States (2)	WTA 500	Hard	(China) Zhang Shuai	(United States) Caroline Dolehide (United States) Sofia Kenin	6–1, 6–1
Loss	10–7	Aug 2025	Canadian Open, Canada	WTA 1000	Hard	(China) Zhang Shuai	(United States) Coco Gauff (United States) McCartney Kessler	4–6, 6–1, [11–13]
Loss	10–8	Sep 2025	US Open, United States	Grand Slam	Hard	(Czech Republic) Kateřina Siniaková	(Canada) Gabriela Dabrowski (New Zealand) Erin Routliffe	4–6, 4–6
Win	11–8	Oct 2025	Japan Women's Open, Japan	WTA 250	Hard	(France) Kristina Mladenovic	(Australia) Storm Hunter (United States) Desirae Krawczyk	6–4, 2–6, [10–5]
Win	12–8	Feb 2026	ATX Open, United States	WTA 250	Hard	(Australia) Storm Hunter	(Hong Kong) Eudice Chong (Chinese Taipei) Liang En-shuo	6–3, 6–4
Win	13–8	Mar 2026	Indian Wells Open, United States	WTA 1000	Hard	(Czech Republic) Kateřina Siniaková	(Kazakhstan) Anna Danilina (Serbia) Aleksandra Krunić	7–6^{(7–4)}, 6–4
Win	14–8	Mar 2026	Miami Open, United States	WTA 1000	Hard	(Czech Republic) Kateřina Siniaková	(Italy) Sara Errani (Italy) Jasmine Paolini	7–6^{(7–0)}, 6–1
Win	15–8	May 2026	Madrid Open, Spain	WTA 1000	Clay	(Czech Republic) Kateřina Siniaková	Mirra Andreeva; Diana Shnaider	7–6^{(7–2)}, 6–2
Win	16–8	Jun 2026	French Open, France	Grand Slam	Clay	(Czech Republic) Kateřina Siniaková	(Kazakhstan) Anna Danilina (Serbia) Aleksandra Krunić	6–2, 7–5
Win	17–8	Sep 2026	US Open, United States	Grand Slam	Hard	(Czech Republic) Kateřina Siniaková	(United States) Ashlyn Krueger (United States) Robin Montgomery	5–7, 6–0, 6–2
Win	18–8	Nov 2026	WTA Finals, United States	Finals	Hard	(Czech Republic) Kateřina Siniaková	(Italy) Sara Errani (Italy) Jasmine Paolini	6–4, 6–3

== WTA Challenger finals ==
=== Singles: 1 (runner-up) ===
Result	W–L	Date	Tournament	Surface	Opponent	Score
Loss	0–1	May 2023	Firenze Ladies Open, Italy	Clay	(Italy) Jasmine Paolini	3–6, 5–7

=== Doubles: 4 (2 titles, 2 runner-ups) ===
Result	W–L	Date	Tournament	Surface	Partner	Opponents	Score
Win	1–0	Mar 2018	Indian Wells Challenger, United States	Hard	(Belgium) Yanina Wickmayer	(United States) Jennifer Brady (United States) Vania King	6–4, 6–4
Loss	1–1	Jan 2019	Newport Beach Challenger, United States	Hard	(Belgium) Yanina Wickmayer	(United States) Hayley Carter (Japan) Ena Shibahara	3–6, 6–7^{(1–7)}
Loss	1–2	Mar 2019	Indian Wells Challenger, United States	Hard	(Belgium) Yanina Wickmayer	(Czech Republic) Kristýna Plíšková (Russia) Evgeniya Rodina	6–7^{(7–9)}, 4–6
Win	2–2	Mar 2020	Indian Wells Challenger, United States (2)	Hard	(United States) Asia Muhammad	(United States) Caty McNally (United States) Jessica Pegula	6–4, 6–4

== ITF Circuit finals ==
=== Singles: 17 (14 titles, 3 runner-ups) ===
Legend $100,000 tournaments (2–0) $75/80,000 tournaments (5–1) $50/60,000 tournaments (4–1) $25,000 tournaments (3–1)	Finals by surface Hard (7–0) Clay (7–3)

Result	W–L	Date	Tournament	Tier	Surface	Opponent	Score
Win	1–0	Apr 2014	Charlottesville Open, United States	50,000	Clay	(Paraguay) Montserrat González	6–2, 6–3
Win	2–0	May 2014	ITF Indian Harbour Beach, United States	50,000	Clay	(Kazakhstan) Yulia Putintseva	6–1, 6–1
Loss	2–1	Apr 2016	Dothan Pro Classic, United States	50,000	Clay	(Sweden) Rebecca Peterson	4–6, 2–6
Win	3–1	Apr 2016	Charlottesville Open, United States (2)	50,000	Clay	(United States) Grace Min	7–5, 6–1
Loss	3–2	May 2016	ITF Indian Harbour Beach, United States	75,000	Clay	(United States) Jennifer Brady	3–6, 5–7
Loss	3–3	May 2017	ITF Naples, United States	25,000	Clay	(Russia) Sofya Zhuk	4–6, 6–7^{(3–7)}
Win	4–3	Oct 2017	ITF Sumter, United States	25,000	Hard	(Norway) Ulrikke Eikeri	6–2, 6–1
Win	5–3	Oct 2017	ITF Florence, United States	25,000	Hard	(Belgium) Ysaline Bonaventure	6–1, 7–5
Win	6–3	Nov 2017	Waco Showdown, United States	80,000	Hard	(Croatia) Ajla Tomljanović	6–3, 2–6, 6–2
Win	7–3	Apr 2018	Dothan Pro Classic, United States	80,000	Clay	(Colombia) Mariana Duque Mariño	6–2, 2–6, 6–1
Win	8–3	May 2018	ITF Charleston Pro, United States	80,000	Clay	(United States) Madison Brengle	6–0, 6–4
Win	9–3	Jun 2018	ITF Sumter, United States	25,000	Hard	(France) Alizé Lim	w/o
Win	10–3	May 2019	ITF Charleston Pro, United States (2)	100,000	Clay	(United States) Whitney Osuigwe	6–4, 6–4
Win	11–3	May 2022	ITF Charleston Pro, United States (3)	100,000	Clay	(China) Wang Xiyu	6–3, 6–2
Win	12–3	Oct 2022	Tyler Pro Challenge, United States	80,000	Hard	(China) Yuan Yue	6–4, 6–2
Win	13–3	Oct 2023	ITF Templeton Pro, United States	60,000	Hard	(Mexico) Renata Zarazúa	6–3, 6–1
Win	14–3	Oct 2023	Tennis Classic of Macon, United States	80,000	Hard	(Hungary) Panna Udvardy	6–3, 6–4

=== Doubles: 24 (17 titles, 7 runner-ups) ===
Legend $100,000 tournaments (1–0) $75/80,000 tournaments (2–2) $50,000 tournaments (10–3) $25,000 tournaments (4–2)	Finals by surface Hard (9–6) Clay (8–1)

Result	W–L	Date	Tournament	Tier	Surface	Partner	Opponents	Score
Loss	0–1	Sep 2013	Albuquerque Championships, United States	75,000	Hard	(United States) Melanie Oudin	(Greece) Eleni Daniilidou (United States) CoCo Vandeweghe	4–6, 6–7^{(2–7)}
Loss	0–2	Nov 2013	ITF New Braunfels, United States	50,000	Hard	(United States) Asia Muhammad	(Georgia (country)) Anna Tatishvili (United States) CoCo Vandeweghe	6–3, 3–6, [11–13]
Win	1–2	Apr 2014	Charlottesville Open, United States	50,000	Clay	(United States) Asia Muhammad	(United States) Irina Falconi (United States) Maria Sanchez	6–3, 6–1
Win	2–2	May 2014	ITF Indian Harbour Beach, United States	50,000	Clay	(United States) Asia Muhammad	(United States) Jan Abaza (United States) Sanaz Marand	6–2, 6–1
Win	3–2	Oct 2014	Toronto Challenger, Canada	50,000	Hard (i)	(United States) Maria Sanchez	(Canada) Gabriela Dabrowski (Germany) Tatjana Maria	7–5, 4–6, [15–13]
Win	4–2	May 2015	ITF Indian Harbour Beach, United States (2)	50,000	Clay	(United States) Maria Sanchez	(Russia) Angelina Gabueva (United States) Alexandra Stevenson	6–0, 6–1
Loss	4–3	Jan 2016	Championships of Maui, United States	50,000	Hard	(United States) Jessica Pegula	(United States) Asia Muhammad (United States) Maria Sanchez	2–6, 6–3, [6–10]
Win	5–3	Feb 2016	Rancho Santa Fe Open, United States	25,000	Hard	(United States) Asia Muhammad	(United States) Jessica Pegula (Canada) Carol Zhao	6–3, 6–4
Win	6–3	Apr 2016	ITF Osprey Pro, United States	50,000	Hard	(United States) Asia Muhammad	(United States) Louisa Chirico (United States) Katerina Stewart	6–1, 6–7^{(5–7)}, [10–4]
Win	7–3	Apr 2016	ITF Pelham, United States	25,000	Clay	(United States) Asia Muhammad	(United States) Sophie Chang (United States) Caitlin Whoriskey	6–2, 6–3
Win	8–3	Apr 2016	Dothan Pro Classic, United States	50,000	Clay	(United States) Asia Muhammad	(United States) Caitlin Whoriskey (United States) Keri Wong	6–0, 6–1
Win	9–3	Apr 2016	Charlottesville Open, United States (2)	50,000	Clay	(United States) Asia Muhammad	(Russia) Alexandra Panova (United States) Shelby Rogers	7–6^{(7–4)}, 6–0
Loss	9–4	Sep 2016	Atlanta Open, United States	50,000	Hard	(United States) Alexandra Stevenson	(United States) Ingrid Neel (Brazil) Luisa Stefani	6–4, 4–6, [5–10]
Win	10–4	Oct 2016	Tennis Classic of Macon, United States	50,000	Hard	(Netherlands) Michaëlla Krajicek	(United States) Sabrina Santamaria (United States) Keri Wong	3–6, 6–2, [10–6]
Win	11–4	Nov 2016	Scottsdale Challenge, United States	50,000	Hard	(United States) Ingrid Neel	(United States) Samantha Crawford (United States) Melanie Oudin	6–4, 6–3
Win	12–4	Nov 2016	Waco Showdown, United States	50,000	Hard	(Netherlands) Michaëlla Krajicek	(Romania) Mihaela Buzărnescu (Mexico) Renata Zarazúa	w/o
Loss	12–5	May 2017	ITF Naples, United States	25,000	Clay	(United States) Danielle Collins	(United States) Emina Bektas (United States) Sanaz Marand	6–7^{(1–7)}, 1–6
Win	13–5	Oct 2017	ITF Sumter, United States	25,000	Hard	(United States) Jessica Pegula	(United States) Alexandra Mueller (United States) Caitlin Whoriskey	4–6, 7–5, [10–5]
Win	14–5	Oct 2017	ITF Florence, United States	25,000	Hard	(United States) Maria Sanchez	(United Kingdom) Tara Moore (Switzerland) Amra Sadiković	6–1, 6–2
Win	15–5	Nov 2017	Tyler Pro Challenge, United States	80,000	Hard	(United States) Jessica Pegula	(United States) Jamie Loeb (Sweden) Rebecca Peterson	6–4, 6–1
Loss	15–6	Nov 2017	Waco Showdown, United States	80,000	Hard	(United States) Jessica Pegula	(United States) Sofia Kenin (Russia) Anastasiya Komardina	5–7, 7–5, [9–11]
Loss	15–7	Feb 2018	Rancho Santa Fe Open, United States	25,000	Hard	(Czech Republic) Eva Hrdinová	(United States) Kaitlyn Christian (United States) Sabrina Santamaria	7–6^{(8–6)}, 1–6, [6–10]
Win	16–7	Apr 2019	Charlottesville Open, United States (3)	80,000	Clay	(United States) Asia Muhammad	(Czech Republic) Lucie Hradecká (Poland) Katarzyna Kawa	4–6, 7–5, [10–3]
Win	17–7	May 2019	ITF Charleston Pro, United States	100,000	Clay	(United States) Asia Muhammad	(United States) Madison Brengle (United States) Lauren Davis	6–2, 6–2

== Junior Grand Slam finals ==
=== Singles: 2 (1 title, 1 runner-up) ===
Result	Year	Tournament	Surface	Opponent	Score
Win	2012	Australian Open	Hard	(Kazakhstan) Yulia Putintseva	6–1, 3–6, 6–3
Loss	2013	Wimbledon	Grass	(Switzerland) Belinda Bencic	6–4, 1–6, 4–6

=== Doubles: 4 (3 titles, 1 runner-up) ===
Result	Year	Tournament	Surface	Partner	Opponents	Score
Loss	2011	US Open	Hard	(United States) Gabrielle Andrews	(Russia) Irina Khromacheva (Netherlands) Demi Schuurs	4–6, 7–5, [5–10]
Win	2012	Australian Open	Hard	(United States) Gabrielle Andrews	(Russia) Irina Khromacheva (Montenegro) Danka Kovinić	5–7, 7–5, [10–6]
Win	2012	Wimbledon	Grass	(Canada) Eugenie Bouchard	(Switzerland) Belinda Bencic (Croatia) Ana Konjuh	6–4, 6–3
Win	2012	US Open	Hard	(United States) Gabrielle Andrews	(Switzerland) Belinda Bencic (Slovakia) Petra Uberalová	6–4, 6–3

== Wins over top 10 players ==
- Townsend has a 3–19 record against players who were, at the time the match was played, ranked in the top 10.

Season	2019	2020	2021	2022	2023	2024	2025	2026	Total
Wins	1	0	0	0	1	0	1	0	3

#	Player	Rk	Event	Surface	Rd	Score	Rk
2019
1.	(Romania) Simona Halep	4	US Open, United States	Hard	2R	2–6, 6–3, 7–6^{(7–4)}	116
2023
2.	(United States) Jessica Pegula	3	Italian Open, Italy	Clay	2R	6–2, 3–6, 6–3	168
2025
3.	Mirra Andreeva	5	US Open, United States	Hard	3R	7–5, 6–2	139
