= 2015 Revolution Technologies Pro Tennis Classic =

- Date: 4–10 May
- Edition: 10th
- Category: ITF Women's Circuit
- Prize money: $50,000
- Surface: Clay
- Location: Indian Harbour Beach, Florida, United States

Champions

Singles
- (United States) Katerina Stewart

Doubles
- (United States) Maria Sanchez / (United States) Taylor Townsend
← 2014 ·	Revolution Technologies Pro Tennis Classic	· 2016 →

The 2015 Revolution Technologies Pro Tennis Classic was a professional tennis tournament played on outdoor clay courts. It was the tenth edition of the tournament and part of the 2015 ITF Women's Circuit, offering a total of $50,000 in prize money. It took place in Indian Harbour Beach, Florida, United States, on 4–10 May 2015.

== Singles main draw entrants ==
=== Seeds ===
Country	Player	Rank^{1}	Seed
USA	Taylor Townsend	115	1
POR	Michelle Larcher de Brito	128	2
ARG	Paula Ormaechea	152	3
ROU	Patricia Maria Țig	179	4
USA	Maria Sanchez	184	5
USA	Julia Boserup	226	6
USA	Katerina Stewart	230	7
ARG	Florencia Molinero	236	8

- ^{1} Rankings as of 27 April 2015

=== Other entrants ===
The following players received wildcards into the singles main draw:

- (United States) Mercedes Hammond
- (United States) Erica Oosterhout
- (United States) Rianna Valdes

The following players received entry from the qualifying draw:

- (United States) Louisa Chirico^{2}
- (United States) Alexa Graham
- (Russia) Anastasia Evgenyevna Nefedova
- (United States) Chiara Scholl
- ^{2} Chirico would have been second seeded, but entered late and had to qualify

== Champions ==
=== Singles ===
- (United States) Katerina Stewart def. (United States) Louisa Chirico, 6–4, 3–6, 6–3

=== Doubles ===
- (United States) Maria Sanchez / (United States) Taylor Townsend def. (Russia) Angelina Gabueva / (United States) Alexandra Stevenson, 6–0, 6–1
