= 2016 Revolution Technologies Pro Tennis Classic =

- Date: 2–8 May
- Edition: 11th
- Category: ITF Women's Circuit
- Prize money: $75,000
- Surface: Clay
- Location: Indian Harbour Beach, Florida, United States

Champions

Singles
- (United States) Jennifer Brady

Doubles
- (Israel) Julia Glushko / (Russia) Alexandra Panova
| ← 2015 · | Revolution Technologies Pro Tennis Classic | · 2017 → |

The 2016 Revolution Technologies Pro Tennis Classic was a professional tennis tournament played on outdoor clay courts. It was the eleventh edition of the tournament and part of the 2016 ITF Women's Circuit, offering a total of $75,000 in prize money. It took place in Indian Harbour Beach, Florida, United States, on 2–8 May 2016.

== Singles main draw entrants ==
=== Seeds ===
| Country | Player | Rank^{1} | Seed |
|---|---|---|---|
| USA | Shelby Rogers | 109 | 1 |
| USA | Lauren Davis | 112 | 2 |
| USA | Anna Tatishvili | 116 | 3 |
| RUS | Alexandra Panova | 142 | 4 |
| ISR | Julia Glushko | 144 | 5 |
| USA | Jessica Pegula | 152 | 6 |
| NED | Cindy Burger | 156 | 7 |
| BEL | Elise Mertens | 162 | 8 |

- ^{1} Rankings as of 25 April 2016.

=== Other entrants ===
The following players received wildcards into the singles main draw:

- (United States) Usue Maitane Arconada
- (United States) Sofia Kenin
- (United States) Raveena Kingsley
- (United States) Sanaz Marand

The following players received entry from the qualifying draw:

- (United States) Caroline Dolehide
- (Norway) Ulrikke Eikeri
- (United States) Julia Jones
- (United States) Bernarda Pera

The following player received entry by a protected ranking:

- (United States) Melanie Oudin

The following player received entry by a special exempt:

- (United States) Taylor Townsend

== Champions ==
=== Singles ===
- (United States) Jennifer Brady def. (United States) Taylor Townsend, 6–3, 7–5

=== Doubles ===
- (Israel) Julia Glushko / (Russia) Alexandra Panova def. (United States) Jessica Pegula / (United States) Maria Sanchez, 7–5, 6–4
