= 2000 Fed Cup Europe/Africa Zone Group II – Pool C =

Group C of the 2000 Fed Cup Europe/Africa Zone Group II was one of four pools in the Europe/Africa zone of the 2000 Fed Cup. Five teams competed in a round robin competition, with the top team advancing to Group I for 2001.

	(Federal Republic of Yugoslavia) YUG	(Georgia (country)) GEO	(Lithuania) LIT	(Egypt) EGY	(Armenia) ARM	(Cyprus) CYP	Match; W–L	Set; W–L	Game; W–L	Standings
Yugoslavia		2–1	3–0	w/o	3–0	3–0	5–0	22–5	151–67	1
Georgia	1–2		1–0	3–0	3–0	3–0	4–1	23–5	156–84	2
Lithuania	0–3	0–1		3–0	2–1	3–0	3–2	18–8	120–89	3
Egypt	w/o	0–3	0–3		2–1	3–0	2–3	10–15	88–105	4
Armenia	0–3	0–3	1–2	1–2		1–0	1–4	6–22	80–136	5
Cyprus	0–3	0–3	0–3	0–3	0–1		0–5	2–26	48–164	6

== Yugoslavia vs. Georgia ==
Yugoslavia
2
Estoril T.C., Estoril, Portugal
28 March 2000
Red clay (outdoors)

Georgia
1

			1	2	3
1	(Federal Republic of Yugoslavia) (Georgia (country))	Dragana Zarić; Salome Devidze	6; 2	6; 4
2	(Federal Republic of Yugoslavia) (Georgia (country))	Katarina Mišić; Margalita Chakhnashvili	5; 7	3; 6
3	(Federal Republic of Yugoslavia) (Georgia (country))	Katarina Mišić / Dragana Zarić; Margalita Chakhnashvili / Salome Devidze	2; 6	7^{7} 6^{5}	6; 1

== Lithuania vs. Armenia ==
Lithuania
3
Estoril T.C., Estoril, Portugal
28 March 2000
Red clay (outdoors)

Armenia
0

			1	2	3
1	(Lithuania) (Armenia)	Edita Liachovičiūtė; Sona Saringulyan	6; 1	6; 1
2	(Lithuania) (Armenia)	Ilona Jarkova; Ana Gasparyan	4; 6	0; 6
3	(Lithuania) (Armenia)	Ilona Jarkova / Edita Liachovičiūtė; Ana Gasparyan / Sona Saringulyan	6; 1	6; 2

== Egypt vs. Cyprus ==
Egypt
3
Estoril T.C., Estoril, Portugal
28 March 2000
Red clay (outdoors)

Cyprus
0

			1	2	3
1	(Egypt) (Cyprus)	Dalia El Sheikh; Pavlina Akritas	2; 6	6; 1	6; 2
2	(Egypt) (Cyprus)	Yomna Farid; Annita Stylianidou	6; 1	6; 0
3	(Egypt) (Cyprus)	Sara Badran / Dalia El Sheikh; Pavlina Akritas / Annita Stylianidou	6; 0	6; 1

== Yugoslavia vs. Cyprus ==
Yugoslavia
3
Estoril T.C., Estoril, Portugal
29 March 2000
Red clay (outdoors)

Cyprus
0

			1	2	3
1	(Federal Republic of Yugoslavia) (Cyprus)	Renata Ljukovčan; Pavlina Akritas	6; 3	6; 4
2	(Federal Republic of Yugoslavia) (Cyprus)	Dragana Zarić; Annita Stylianidou	6; 0	6; 0
3	(Federal Republic of Yugoslavia) (Cyprus)	Katarina Mišić / Marina Petrović; Pavlina Akritas / Annita Stylianidou	6; 0	6; 1

== Georgia vs. Armenia ==
Georgia
3
Estoril T.C., Estoril, Portugal
29 March 2000
Red clay (outdoors)

Armenia
0

			1	2	3
1	(Georgia (country)) (Armenia)	Salome Devidze; Sona Saringulyan	6; 3	7^{10} 6^{8}
2	(Georgia (country)) (Armenia)	Margalita Chakhnashvili; Ana Gasparyan	6; 4	6; 2
3	(Georgia (country)) (Armenia)	Salome Devidze / Nino Esebua; Tatevik Babayan / Hermine Sukiasyan	6; 1	6; 2

== Lithuania vs. Egypt ==
Lithuania
3
Estoril T.C., Estoril, Portugal
29 March 2000
Red clay (outdoors)

Egypt
0

			1	2	3
1	(Lithuania) (Egypt)	Edita Liachovičiūtė; Dina Khalil	6; 4	6; 0
2	(Lithuania) (Egypt)	Ilona Jarkova; Yomna Farid	6; 2	6; 0
3	(Lithuania) (Egypt)	Ilona Jarkova / Monika Pečiulionytė; Sara Badran / Dalia El Sheikh	6; 0	6; 1

== Yugoslavia vs. Armenia ==
Yugoslavia
3
Estoril T.C., Estoril, Portugal
30 March 2000
Red clay (outdoors)

Armenia
0

			1	2	3
1	(Federal Republic of Yugoslavia) (Armenia)	Marina Petrović; Sona Saringulyan	6; 3	6; 4
2	(Federal Republic of Yugoslavia) (Armenia)	Katarina Mišić; Ana Gasparyan	6; 4	6; 1
3	(Federal Republic of Yugoslavia) (Armenia)	Renata Ljukovčan / Dragana Zarić; Tatevik Babayan / Hermine Sukiasyan	6; 0	6; 1

== Georgia vs. Egypt ==
Georgia
3
Estoril T.C., Estoril, Portugal
30 March 2000
Red clay (outdoors)

Egypt
0

			1	2	3
1	(Georgia (country)) (Egypt)	Salome Devidze; Dalia El Sheikh	6; 4	6; 4
2	(Georgia (country)) (Egypt)	Margalita Chakhnashvili; Yomna Farid	6; 2	6; 1
3	(Georgia (country)) (Egypt)	Salome Devidze / Nino Esebua; Dalia El Sheikh / Yomna Farid	6; 1	6; 3

== Lithuania vs. Cyprus ==
Lithuania
3
Estoril T.C., Estoril, Portugal
30 March 2000
Red clay (outdoors)

Cyprus
0

			1	2	3
1	(Lithuania) (Cyprus)	Edita Liachovičiūtė; Pavlina Akritas	6; 2	6; 1
2	(Lithuania) (Cyprus)	Ilona Jarkova; Annita Stylianidou	6; 2	6; 1
3	(Lithuania) (Cyprus)	Ilona Jarkova / Monika Pečiulionytė; Elya Constanta / Annita Stylianidou	6; 3	6; 0

== Yugoslavia vs. Lithuania ==
Yugoslavia
3
Estoril T.C., Estoril, Portugal
31 March 2000
Red clay (outdoors)

Lithuania
0

			1	2	3
1	(Federal Republic of Yugoslavia) (Lithuania)	Dragana Zarić; Edita Liachovičiūtė	4; 6	6; 1	6; 3
2	(Federal Republic of Yugoslavia) (Lithuania)	Katarina Mišić; Ilona Jarkova	6; 0	6; 0
3	(Federal Republic of Yugoslavia) (Lithuania)	Renata Ljukovčan / Marina Petrović; Monika Pečiulionytė / Lina Stančiūtė	4; 6	6; 1	6; 0

== Georgia vs. Cyprus ==
Georgia
3
Estoril T.C., Estoril, Portugal
31 March 2000
Red clay (outdoors)

Cyprus
0

			1	2	3
1	(Georgia (country)) (Cyprus)	Nino Esebua; Pavlina Akritas	3; 6	6; 3	6; 1
2	(Georgia (country)) (Cyprus)	Margalita Chakhnashvili; Annita Stylianidou	6; 1	6; 1
3	(Georgia (country)) (Cyprus)	Salome Devidze / Nino Esebua; Elya Constanta / Pavlina Akritas	6; 0	6; 1

== Egypt vs. Armenia ==
Egypt
3
Estoril T.C., Estoril, Portugal
31 March 2000
Red clay (outdoors)

Armenia
0

			1	2	3
1	(Egypt) (Armenia)	Dina Khalil; Sona Saringulyan	6; 3	6; 0
2	(Egypt) (Armenia)	Dalia El Sheikh; Ana Gasparyan	0; 6	4; 6
3	(Egypt) (Armenia)	Dina Khalil / Yomna Farid; Ana Gasparyan / Sona Saringulyan	6; 4	6; 3

== Georgia vs. Lithuania ==
Georgia
1
Estoril T.C., Estoril, Portugal
1 April 2000
Red clay (outdoors)

Lithuania
0

			1	2	3
1	(Georgia (country)) (Lithuania)	Salome Devidze; Lina Stančiūtė	6; 0	6; 3
2	(Georgia (country)) (Lithuania)	Margalita Chakhnashvili; Monika Pečiulionytė				not played
3	(Georgia (country)) (Lithuania)					not played

== Armenia vs. Cyprus ==
Armenia
1
Estoril T.C., Estoril, Portugal
1 April 2000
Red clay (outdoors)

Cyprus
0

			1	2	3
1	(Armenia) (Cyprus)	Hermine Sukiasyan; Elya Constanta	6; 2	6; 0
2	(Armenia) (Cyprus)	Tatevik Babayan; Pavlina Akritas	1; 5			not completed
3	(Armenia) (Cyprus)

- Yugoslavia placed first in this group and thus advanced to Group I for 2001, where they placed second in their pool of four.

== See also ==
- Fed Cup structure
