= 2017 Revolution Technologies Pro Tennis Classic – Doubles =

Doubles
- 2017 Revolution Technologies Pro Tennis Classic

Final
- Champion: (United States) Kristie Ahn (United States) Quinn Gleason
- Runner-up: (Brazil) Laura Pigossi (Mexico) Renata Zarazúa
- Score: 6–3, 6–2

Events
Singles	Doubles
← 2016 ·	Revolution Technologies Pro Tennis Classic	· 2018 →

Julia Glushko and Alexandra Panova were the defending champions, but both players chose not to participate.

Kristie Ahn and Quinn Gleason won the title, defeating Laura Pigossi and Renata Zarazúa in the final, 6–3, 6–2.

== Seeds ==
1. (United States) Jamie Loeb / (Belgium) An-Sophie Mestach (semifinals)
2. (Brazil) Laura Pigossi / (Mexico) Renata Zarazúa (final)
3. (United Kingdom) Tara Moore / (Germany) Anna Zaja (quarterfinals)
4. (United States) Elizabeth Halbauer / (United States) Sofia Kenin (quarterfinals)

== Draw ==
Key

- Q = Qualifier
- WC = Wild card
- LL = Lucky loser
- Alt = Alternate
- ITF = ITF entry
- PR = Protected ranking
- SR = Special ranking
- SE = Special exempt
- JE = Junior exempt
- JR = Junior Accelerator Programme entrant
- CO = College Accelerator Programme entrant
- NG = Next Gen Accelerator Program entrant
- w/o = Walkover
- r = Retired
- d = Defaulted

First round
1	(United States) J Loeb (Belgium) A-S Mestach	6	6
(United States) M Gallegos (United States) S Iyer	1	0
(United States) J Boyd (United States) S Edley	0	1
(New Zealand) M Erakovic (Canada) A Wozniak	6	6
4	(United States) E Halbauer (United States) S Kenin	2	7	[10]
(United States) K Christian (United States) M Gordon	6	5	[2]
(United States) K Ahn (United States) Q Gleason	6	6
(Poland) K Kubicz (United States) A Rodgers	4	1
(United States) A Anisimova (Ukraine) A Kalinina	6	6
(Georgia (country)) S Devidze (United States) N Uberoi	3	1
(Ukraine) A Sotnikova (United States) C Van Nguyen	5	4
3	(United Kingdom) T Moore (Germany) A Zaja	7	6
WC	(United States) A Belaya (United States) A Maynetto	1	6	[6]
(Bulgaria) S Karatantcheva (United States) M Schmidt	6	4	[10]
(United States) M Brengle (United States) V Duval	2	2
2	(Brazil) L Pigossi (Mexico) R Zarazúa	6	6

Quarterfinals
1	(United States) J Loeb (Belgium) A-S Mestach	w/o
(New Zealand) M Erakovic (Canada) A Wozniak
4	(United States) E Halbauer (United States) S Kenin	6	1	[7]
(United States) K Ahn (United States) Q Gleason	2	6	[10]
(United States) A Anisimova (Ukraine) A Kalinina	6	6
3	(United Kingdom) T Moore (Germany) A Zaja	1	2
(Bulgaria) S Karatantcheva (United States) M Schmidt	5	6	[11]
2	(Brazil) L Pigossi (Mexico) R Zarazúa	7	4	[13]

Semifinals
1	(United States) J Loeb (Belgium) A-S Mestach	3	4
(United States) K Ahn (United States) Q Gleason	6	6
(United States) A Anisimova (Ukraine) A Kalinina
2	(Brazil) L Pigossi (Mexico) R Zarazúa	w/o

Final
(United States) K Ahn (United States) Q Gleason	6	6
2	(Brazil) L Pigossi (Mexico) R Zarazúa	3	2
