= 2018 Space Coast Pro Tennis Classic – Doubles =

Doubles
- 2018 Space Coast Pro Tennis Classic

Final
- Champions: (Romania) Irina Bara (Spain) Sílvia Soler Espinosa
- Runners-up: (United States) Jessica Pegula (United States) Maria Sanchez
- Score: 6–4, 6–2

Events
Singles	Doubles
← 2017 ·	Space Coast Pro Tennis Classic	· 2019 →

Kristie Ahn and Quinn Gleason were the defending champions but only Gleason chose to defend her title, partnering Francesca Di Lorenzo. Gleason and Di Lorenzo lost in the quarterfinals to Sophie Chang and Alexandra Mueller.

Irina Bara and Sílvia Soler Espinosa won the title after defeating Jessica Pegula and Maria Sanchez 6–4, 6–2 in the final.

== Seeds ==
1. (Romania) Irina Bara / (Spain) Sílvia Soler Espinosa (champions)
2. (United States) Jessica Pegula / (United States) Maria Sanchez (final)
3. (United States) Sophie Chang / (United States) Alexandra Mueller (semifinals)
4. (United States) Ingrid Neel / (United States) Taylor Townsend (semifinals, withdrew)

== Draw ==
=== Key ===
- Q = Qualifier
- WC = Wild card
- LL = Lucky loser
- Alt = Alternate
- SE = Special exempt
- PR = Protected ranking
- ITF = ITF entry
- JE = Junior exempt
- w/o = Walkover
- r = Retired
- d = Defaulted
- SR = Special ranking

=== Draw ===
First round
1	(Romania) I Bara (Spain) S Soler Espinosa	6	6
WC	(United States) A Parks (United States) A Smith	2	4
(United States) M Brengle (United States) V Duval	7^{7}	6
WC	(Canada) F Abanda (Japan) M Doi	6^{1}	2
3	(United States) S Chang (United States) A Mueller	3	6	[10]
WC	(United States) B Boren (United States) A Rodgers	6	1	[4]
(Israel) D Khazaniuk (United States) C Van Nguyen	1	3
(United States) F Di Lorenzo (United States) Q Gleason	6	6
(Canada) S Fichman (United States) J Loeb	7^{7}	6
(Bulgaria) S Karatantcheva (United States) M Schmidt	6^{4}	3
(United States) J Elbaba (Japan) R Ozaki	4	0
4	(United States) I Neel (United States) T Townsend	6	6
(United States) UM Arconada (Norway) U Eikeri	6	6
(Mexico) S León (United States) N Maynetto	4	2
(Georgia (country)) S Devidze (Russia) A Zhuravleva	1	2
2	(United States) J Pegula (United States) M Sanchez	6	6

Quarterfinals
1	(Romania) I Bara (Spain) S Soler Espinosa	5
(United States) M Brengle (United States) V Duval	0^{r}
3	(United States) S Chang (United States) A Mueller	6	6
(United States) F Di Lorenzo (United States) Q Gleason	4	3
(Canada) S Fichman (United States) J Loeb	4	4
4	(United States) I Neel (United States) T Townsend	6	6
(United States) UM Arconada (Norway) U Eikeri	4	3
2	(United States) J Pegula (United States) M Sanchez	6	6

Semifinals
1	(Romania) I Bara (Spain) S Soler Espinosa	7^{7}	6
3	(United States) S Chang (United States) A Mueller	6^{1}	3
4	(United States) I Neel (United States) T Townsend
2	(United States) J Pegula (United States) M Sanchez	w/o

Final
1	(Romania) I Bara (Spain) S Soler Espinosa	6	6
2	(United States) J Pegula (United States) M Sanchez	4	2
