= 2018 Space Coast Pro Tennis Classic – Singles =

Singles
- 2018 Space Coast Pro Tennis Classic

Final
- Champion: (United States) Caroline Dolehide
- Runner-up: (Romania) Irina Bara
- Score: 6–4, 7–5

Events
Singles	Doubles
← 2017 ·	Space Coast Pro Tennis Classic	· 2019 →

Olga Govortsova was the defending champion, but chose to compete in Pelham instead.

Caroline Dolehide won the title after defeating Irina Bara 6–4, 7–5 in the final.

== Seeds ==
1. (United States) Madison Brengle (semifinals; withdrew)
2. (United States) Kristie Ahn (second round)
3. (Slovakia) Jana Čepelová (quarterfinals)
4. (United States) Taylor Townsend (semifinals)
5. (Canada) Françoise Abanda (quarterfinals)
6. (Tunisia) Ons Jabeur (quarterfinals)
7. (United States) Caroline Dolehide (champion)
8. (United States) Jamie Loeb (first round)

== Draw ==
=== Key ===
- Q = Qualifier
- WC = Wild card
- LL = Lucky loser
- Alt = Alternate
- SE = Special exempt
- PR = Protected ranking
- ITF = ITF entry
- JE = Junior exempt
- w/o = Walkover
- r = Retired
- d = Defaulted
- SR = Special ranking

=== Finals ===
Semifinals
1	(United States) Madison Brengle
7	(United States) Caroline Dolehide	w/o
4	(United States) Taylor Townsend	7^{7}	5	5
(Romania) Irina Bara	6^{5}	7	7

Final
7	(United States) Caroline Dolehide	6	7
(Romania) Irina Bara	4	5

=== Top half ===
First round
1	(United States) M Brengle	6	6
(United States) K Day	4	3
WC	(United States) Q Gleason	6	0
Q	(France) E Salas	2	0^{r}
WC	(United States) A Rodgers	3	4
(United States) S Chang	6	6
(Bulgaria) S Karatantcheva	6	6
8	(United States) J Loeb	2	1
3	(Slovakia) J Čepelová	6	4	6
WC	(United States) J Pegula	4	6	3
(Spain) S Soler Espinosa	6	3	6
(Norway) U Eikeri	2	6	3
(Ukraine) O Ianchuk	4	2
(United States) V Duval	6	6
Q	(United States) A Li	4	5
7	(United States) C Dolehide	6	7

Second round
1	(United States) M Brengle	7	6
WC	(United States) Q Gleason	5	2
(United States) S Chang	6	2	7
(Bulgaria) S Karatantcheva	4	6	5
3	(Slovakia) J Čepelová	7	7^{7}
(Spain) S Soler Espinosa	5	6^{4}
(United States) V Duval	4	1
7	(United States) C Dolehide	6	6

Quarterfinals
1	(United States) M Brengle	7	6
(United States) S Chang	5	3
3	(Slovakia) J Čepelová	5	0
7	(United States) C Dolehide	7	6

Semifinals
1	(United States) M Brengle
7	(United States) C Dolehide	w/o

=== Bottom half ===
First round
5	(Canada) F Abanda	7^{7}	0	6
(Israel) D Khazaniuk	6^{1}	6	3
(Japan) M Doi	6	6
(United States) F Di Lorenzo	1	3
(United States) G Min	6	6
Q	(United States) I Neel	0	0
(Japan) R Ozaki	2	1
4	(United States) T Townsend	6	6
6	(Tunisia) O Jabeur	6	6
(Hungary) G Arn	3	0
Q	(United States) N Melichar	6	6
WC	(United States) M Sanchez	2	2
(United States) UM Arconada	4	2
(Romania) I Bara	6	6
(United States) K Stewart	5	3
2	(United States) K Ahn	7	6

Second round
5	(Canada) F Abanda	6	6
(Japan) M Doi	4	2
(United States) G Min	2	5
4	(United States) T Townsend	6	7
6	(Tunisia) O Jabeur	6^{2}	7	6
Q	(United States) N Melichar	7^{7}	5	2
(Romania) I Bara	7^{12}	7^{7}
2	(United States) K Ahn	6^{10}	6^{4}

Quarterfinals
5	(Canada) F Abanda	2	0
4	(United States) T Townsend	6	6
6	(Tunisia) O Jabeur	3	1
(Romania) I Bara	6	6

Semifinals
4	(United States) T Townsend	7^{7}	5	5
(Romania) I Bara	6^{5}	7	7
