= 2016 Revolution Technologies Pro Tennis Classic – Doubles =

Doubles
- 2016 Revolution Technologies Pro Tennis Classic

Final
- Champions: (Israel) Julia Glushko (Russia) Alexandra Panova
- Runners-up: (United States) Jessica Pegula (United States) Maria Sanchez
- Score: 7–5, 6–4

Events
| Singles | Doubles |
| ← 2015 · | Revolution Technologies Pro Tennis Classic | · 2017 → |

Maria Sanchez and Taylor Townsend were the defending champions, but both players chose to participate with different partners. Townsend partnered Asia Muhammad, but lost in the first round. Sanchez partnered Jessica Pegula and reached the final, losing to Julia Glushko and Alexandra Panova in the final, 7–5, 6–4.

== Seeds ==
1. (United States) Asia Muhammad / (United States) Taylor Townsend (first round)
2. (Israel) Julia Glushko / (Russia) Alexandra Panova (champions)
3. (Belgium) Elise Mertens / (United States) Anna Tatishvili (semifinals)
4. (Brazil) Gabriela Cé / (United States) Sanaz Marand (first round)

== Draw ==
=== Key ===
- Q = Qualifier
- WC = Wild card
- LL = Lucky loser
- Alt = Alternate
- SE = Special exempt
- PR = Protected ranking
- ITF = ITF entry
- JE = Junior exempt
- w/o = Walkover
- r = Retired
- d = Defaulted
- SR = Special ranking

First round
1 | (United States) A Muhammad (United States) T Townsend | 0 | 6^{4}
(United States) J Brady (United States) K Stewart | 6 | 7^{7}
(United States) J Pegula (United States) M Sanchez | 6 | 5 | [10]
(United States) J Loeb (United States) M Oudin | 3 | 7 | [6]
4 | (Brazil) G Cé (United States) S Marand | 4 | 4
(United States) C Bellis (United States) L Davis | 6 | 6
(Netherlands) C Burger (Sweden) S Celik | 4 | 3
(United States) J Elie (United States) M Gordon | 6 | 6
(Canada) F Abanda (United States) S Vickery | w/o
(Russia) V Flink (Russia) V Solovyeva
(Norway) U Eikeri (Switzerland) C Perrin
3 | (Belgium) E Mertens (United States) A Tatishvili | w/o
(United States) S Chang (Mexico) R Zarazúa | w/o
(United States) B Pera (United States) S Santamaria
(Ukraine) O Ianchuk (Poland) J Jegiołka | 2 | 3
2 | (Israel) J Glushko (Russia) A Panova | 6 | 6

Quarterfinals
(United States) J Brady (United States) K Stewart | 3 | 6 | [2]
(United States) J Pegula (United States) M Sanchez | 6 | 1 | [10]
(United States) C Bellis (United States) L Davis | 7 | 6
(United States) J Elie (United States) M Gordon | 5 | 4
(Canada) F Abanda (United States) S Vickery | 4 | 0
3 | (Belgium) E Mertens (United States) A Tatishvili | 6 | 6
(United States) S Chang (Mexico) R Zarazúa | 4 | 2
2 | (Israel) J Glushko (Russia) A Panova | 6 | 6

Semifinals
(United States) J Pegula (United States) M Sanchez | 6 | 6
(United States) C Bellis (United States) L Davis | 0 | 1
3 | (Belgium) E Mertens (United States) A Tatishvili | 4 | 5
2 | (Israel) J Glushko (Russia) A Panova | 6 | 7

Final
(United States) J Pegula (United States) M Sanchez | 5 | 4
2 | (Israel) J Glushko (Russia) A Panova | 7 | 6
