= 2017 Revolution Technologies Pro Tennis Classic – Singles =

Singles
- 2017 Revolution Technologies Pro Tennis Classic

Final
- Champion: (Belarus) Olga Govortsova
- Runner-up: (United States) Amanda Anisimova
- Score: 6–3, 4–6, 6–3

Events
Singles	Doubles
← 2016 ·	Revolution Technologies Pro Tennis Classic	· 2018 →

Jennifer Brady was the defending champion, but chose not to participate. Olga Govortsova won the title, defeating Amanda Anisimova in the final, 6–3, 4–6, 6–3.

== Seeds ==
1. (Canada) Eugenie Bouchard (quarterfinals)
2. (United States) Madison Brengle (quarterfinals)
3. (United States) Taylor Townsend (first round)
4. (New Zealand) Marina Erakovic (first round)
5. (Tunisia) Ons Jabeur (semifinals)
6. (United Kingdom) Tara Moore (first round)
7. (United States) Jamie Loeb (first round)
8. (Russia) Alla Kudryavtseva (first round)

== Draw ==
Key

- Q = Qualifier
- WC = Wild card
- LL = Lucky loser
- Alt = Alternate
- ITF = ITF entry
- PR = Protected ranking
- SR = Special ranking
- SE = Special exempt
- JE = Junior exempt
- JR = Junior Accelerator Programme entrant
- CO = College Accelerator Programme entrant
- NG = Next Gen Accelerator Program entrant
- w/o = Walkover
- r = Retired
- d = Defaulted

=== Finals ===
Semifinals
WC	(United States) Victoria Duval	0	2
(United States) Amanda Anisimova	6	6
5	(Tunisia) Ons Jabeur	7	3	2
(Belarus) Olga Govortsova	5	6	6

Final
(United States) Amanda Anisimova	3	6	3
(Belarus) Olga Govortsova	6	4	6

=== Top half ===
First round
1/WC	(Canada) E Bouchard	6	2	6
Q	(United States) B Morgan	4	6	4
(United States) J Elie	3	4
PR	(Ukraine) A Kalinina	6	6
WC	(Croatia) A Tomljanović	6^{0}	6	3
WC	(United States) V Duval	7^{7}	2	6
Q	(United States) K Christian	6	6^{3}	6
8	(Russia) A Kudryavtseva	1	7^{7}	2
3	(United States) T Townsend	6	6^{3}	5
(Germany) A Zaja	3	7^{7}	7
(United States) C Dolehide	6	6^{5}	5
(Mexico) R Zarazúa	2	7^{7}	7
(Belgium) A-S Mestach	3	6	6
Q	(United States) Q Gleason	6	2	2
(United States) A Anisimova	4	6	7
6	(United Kingdom) T Moore	6	1	5

Second round
1/WC	(Canada) E Bouchard	7	6
PR	(Ukraine) A Kalinina	5	4
WC	(United States) V Duval	6	6
Q	(United States) K Christian	2	0
(Germany) A Zaja	3	5
(Mexico) R Zarazúa	6	7
(Belgium) A-S Mestach	6	2	3
(United States) A Anisimova	4	6	6

Quarterfinals
1/WC	(Canada) E Bouchard	0	3
WC	(United States) V Duval	6	6
(Mexico) R Zarazúa	2	2
(United States) A Anisimova	6	6

Semifinals
WC	(United States) V Duval	0	2
(United States) A Anisimova	6	6

=== Bottom half ===
First round
5	(Tunisia) O Jabeur	6	6
(United States) E Halbauer	4	2
(Austria) B Haas	3	4
(United States) S Kenin	6	6
(Ukraine) A Sotnikova	1	4
(United States) K Ahn	6	6
(Bulgaria) S Karatantcheva	6	4	6
4	(New Zealand) M Erakovic	4	6	2
7	(United States) J Loeb	2	2
(Belarus) O Govortsova	6	6
(Brazil) L Pigossi	6^{3}	4
(Canada) A Wozniak	7^{7}	6
(United States) L Albanese	6	6
WC	(United States) N Coopersmith	3	0
Q	(Romania) A Dulgheru	1	1^{r}
2	(United States) M Brengle	6	4

Second round
5	(Tunisia) O Jabeur	6	6
(United States) S Kenin	3	1
(United States) K Ahn	6	6
(Bulgaria) S Karatantcheva	3	0
(Belarus) O Govortsova	6	2	7
(Canada) A Wozniak	3	6	5
(United States) L Albanese	0^{r}
2	(United States) M Brengle	3

Quarterfinals
5	(Tunisia) O Jabeur	6	6
(United States) K Ahn	4	4
(Belarus) O Govortsova	7^{9}	6
2	(United States) M Brengle	6^{7}	4

Semifinals
5	(Tunisia) O Jabeur	7	3	2
(Belarus) O Govortsova	5	6	6
