= 2014 Audi Melbourne Pro Tennis Classic =

- Date: April 28–May 4
- Edition: 9th
- Category: ITF Women's Circuit
- Prize money: $50,000
- Surface: Clay
- Location: Indian Harbour Beach, Florida, United States

Champions

Singles
- (United States) Taylor Townsend

Doubles
- (United States) Asia Muhammad / (United States) Taylor Townsend
← 2013 ·	Audi Melbourne Pro Tennis Classic	· 2015 →

The 2014 Audi Melbourne Pro Tennis Classic was a professional tennis tournament played on outdoor clay courts. It was the ninth edition of the tournament and part of the 2014 ITF Women's Circuit, offering a total of $50,000 in prize money. It took place in Indian Harbour Beach, Florida, United States, on April 28–May 4, 2014.

== Singles main draw entrants ==
=== Seeds ===
Country	Player	Rank^{1}	Seed
NZL	Marina Erakovic	63	1
POR	Michelle Larcher de Brito	121	2
~~USA~~	~~Melanie Oudin~~	~~132~~	~~3~~
PAR	Verónica Cepede Royg	139	4
USA	Irina Falconi	144	5
USA	Grace Min	146	6
KAZ	Yulia Putintseva	151	7
USA	Allie Kiick	159	8

- ^{1} Rankings as of April 21, 2014

=== Other entrants ===
The following players received wildcards into the singles main draw:

- (United States) Josie Kuhlman
- (United States) Sanaz Marand
- (United States) Asia Muhammad
- (United States) Allie Will

The following players received entry from the qualifying draw:

- (United States) Samantha Crawford
- (Norway) Ulrikke Eikeri
- (Bulgaria) Dia Evtimova
- (Belgium) Elise Mertens

The following player received entry by a lucky loser spot:

- (United States) Ellie Halbauer

The following player received entry by a special exempt:

- (United States) Taylor Townsend

== Champions ==
=== Singles ===
- (United States) Taylor Townsend def. (Kazakhstan) Yulia Putintseva 6–1, 6–1

=== Doubles ===
- (United States) Asia Muhammad / (United States) Taylor Townsend def. (United States) Jan Abaza / (United States) Sanaz Marand 6–2, 6–1
