= 2015 Revolution Technologies Pro Tennis Classic – Singles =

Singles
- 2015 Revolution Technologies Pro Tennis Classic

Final
- Champion: (United States) Katerina Stewart
- Runner-up: (United States) Louisa Chirico
- Score: 6–4, 3–6, 6–3

Events
Singles	Doubles
← 2014 ·	Revolution Technologies Pro Tennis Classic	· 2016 →

Taylor Townsend was the defending champion, but lost in the first round to wildcard Erica Oosterhout.

Katerina Stewart won the title, defeating Louisa Chirico in an all-American final, 6–4, 3–6, 6–3.

== Seeds ==
1. (United States) Taylor Townsend (first round)
2. (Portugal) Michelle Larcher de Brito (first round)
3. (Argentina) Paula Ormaechea (quarterfinals)
4. (Romania) Patricia Maria Țig (first round)
5. (United States) Maria Sanchez (semifinals)
6. (United States) Julia Boserup (first round)
7. (United States) Katerina Stewart (champion)
8. (Argentina) Florencia Molinero (second round)
- Louisa Chirico would have been second seeded, but entered late and had to qualify.

== Main draw ==
=== Key ===
- Q = Qualifier
- WC = Wild card
- LL = Lucky loser
- Alt = Alternate
- SE = Special exempt
- PR = Protected ranking
- ITF = ITF entry
- JE = Junior exempt
- w/o = Walkover
- r = Retired
- d = Defaulted
- SR = Special ranking

=== Finals ===
Semifinals
5	(United States) Maria Sanchez	6	3	1
Q	(United States) Louisa Chirico	3	6	6
7	(United States) Katerina Stewart	6	6
(United States) Allie Kiick	3	0

Final
Q	(United States) Louisa Chirico	4	6	3
7	(United States) Katerina Stewart	6	3	6

=== Top half ===
First round
1	(United States) T Townsend	4	6	2
WC	(United States) E Oosterhout	6	3	6
(Australia) S Sanders	6	6
WC	(United States) M Hammond	2	2
Q	(Russia) AE Nefedova	3	4
(United States) J Pegula	6	6
Q	(United States) C Scholl	6^{0}	2
5	(United States) M Sanchez	7^{7}	6
4	(Romania) PM Țig	2	3
WC	(United States) R Valdes	6	6
Q	(United States) L Chirico	6	6
(Poland) J Jegiołka	4	3
(United States) S Crawford	6	6
(United States) TA Black	2	4
(Canada) F Abanda	3	7^{7}	6
6	(United States) J Boserup	6	6^{3}	3

Second round
WC	(United States) E Oosterhout	4	4
(Australia) S Sanders	6	6
(United States) J Pegula	1	6	4
5	(United States) M Sanchez	6	1	6
WC	(United States) R Valdes	6^{5}	2
Q	(United States) L Chirico	7^{7}	6
(United States) S Crawford	6	2	5
(Canada) F Abanda	1	6	7

Quarterfinals
(Australia) S Sanders	6^{1}	3
5	(United States) M Sanchez	7^{7}	6
Q	(United States) L Chirico	6	2	6
(Canada) F Abanda	2	6	4

Semifinals
5	(United States) M Sanchez	6	3	1
Q	(United States) L Chirico	3	6	6

=== Bottom half ===
First round
7	(United States) K Stewart	6	7^{7}
(Russia) I Khromacheva	0	6^{4}
(United States) I Neel	4	5
Q	(United States) A Graham	6	7
(United States) S Marand	7	6
(United States) A Morozova	5	3
(Chinese Taipei) C-y Hsu	2	2
3	(Argentina) P Ormaechea	6	6
8	(Argentina) F Molinero	7^{7}	6
(United States) A Stevenson	6^{4}	2
(United States) A Kiick	6	6
(Ukraine) O Ianchuk	4	2
(Brazil) G Cé	5
(Ukraine) E Ianchuk	0^{r}
(Australia) J Moore	6	6
2	(Portugal) M Larcher de Brito	1	2

Second round
7	(United States) K Stewart	5	6	6
Q	(United States) A Graham	7	3	0
(United States) S Marand	1	5
3	(Argentina) P Ormaechea	6	7
8	(Argentina) F Molinero	5	1
(United States) A Kiick	7	6
(Brazil) G Cé	3	7	4
(Australia) J Moore	6	5	6

Quarterfinals
7	(United States) K Stewart	6	6
3	(Argentina) P Ormaechea	1	1
(United States) A Kiick	6	6
(Australia) J Moore	4	4

Semifinals
7	(United States) K Stewart	6	6
(United States) A Kiick	3	0
