= 2016 Revolution Technologies Pro Tennis Classic – Singles =

Singles
- 2016 Revolution Technologies Pro Tennis Classic

Final
- Champion: (United States) Jennifer Brady
- Runner-up: (United States) Taylor Townsend
- Score: 6–3, 7–5

Events
Singles	Doubles
← 2015 ·	Revolution Technologies Pro Tennis Classic	· 2017 →

Katerina Stewart was the defending champion, but lost to Alexandra Panova in the second round.

Jennifer Brady won the title, defeating Taylor Townsend in the final, 6–3, 7–5.

== Seeds ==
1. (United States) Shelby Rogers (quarterfinals)
2. (United States) Lauren Davis (second round)
3. (United States) Anna Tatishvili (semifinals)
4. (Russia) Alexandra Panova (quarterfinals)
5. (Israel) Julia Glushko (second round)
6. (United States) Jessica Pegula (first round)
7. (Netherlands) Cindy Burger (first round)
8. (Belgium) Elise Mertens (second round)

== Main draw ==
=== Key ===
- Q = Qualifier
- WC = Wild card
- LL = Lucky loser
- Alt = Alternate
- SE = Special exempt
- PR = Protected ranking
- ITF = ITF entry
- JE = Junior exempt
- w/o = Walkover
- r = Retired
- d = Defaulted
- SR = Special ranking

=== Finals ===
Semifinals
(United States) Jennifer Brady	6	6
3	(United States) Anna Tatishvili	2	2
SE	(United States) Taylor Townsend	4	6	6
(United States) Asia Muhammad	6	3	3

Final
(United States) Jennifer Brady	6	7
SE	(United States) Taylor Townsend	3	5

=== Top half ===
First round
1	(United States) S Rogers	6	5	6
(United States) C Bellis	1	7	2
WC	(United States) S Kenin	2	6	6
(Switzerland) C Perrin	6	4	2
(United States) J Brady	3	6	6
Q	(United States) C Dolehide	6	4	2
WC	(United States) UM Arconada	6	5	3
8	(Belgium) E Mertens	3	7	6
3	(United States) A Tatishvili	7	6
WC	(United States) S Marand	5	4
(Portugal) M Larcher de Brito	6	3	6
PR	(United States) M Oudin	2	6	1
(United States) S Vickery	4	6	6
(United States) J Boserup	6	0	0
(United States) G Min	4	7	6
6	(United States) J Pegula	6	5	1

Second round
1	(United States) S Rogers	6	7
WC	(United States) S Kenin	1	5
(United States) J Brady	6	6
8	(Belgium) E Mertens	4	3
3	(United States) A Tatishvili	6	6
(Portugal) M Larcher de Brito	1	1
(United States) S Vickery	6	2	2
(United States) G Min	4	6	6

Quarterfinals
1	(United States) S Rogers	6^{1}	2
(United States) J Brady	7^{7}	6
3	(United States) A Tatishvili	7	6
(United States) G Min	5	1

Semifinals
(United States) J Brady	6	6
3	(United States) A Tatishvili	2	2

=== Bottom half ===
First round
7	(Netherlands) C Burger	5	0
(Canada) F Abanda	7	6
Q	(United States) J Jones	3	2
SE	(United States) T Townsend	6	6
(Sweden) S Celik	2	0
(United States) K Stewart	6	6
(United States) J Loeb	3	3
4	(Russia) A Panova	6	6
5	(Israel) J Glushko	6	0
(Ukraine) E Ianchuk	1	0^{r}
Q	(Norway) U Eikeri	4	3
Q	(United States) B Pera	6	6
(United States) A Muhammad	7^{7}	6
(United States) M Sanchez	6^{4}	1
WC	(United States) R Kingsley	2	3
2	(United States) L Davis	6	6

Second round
(Canada) F Abanda	7	1	3
SE	(United States) T Townsend	5	6	6
(United States) K Stewart	2	3
4	(Russia) A Panova	6	6
5	(Israel) J Glushko	3	3
Q	(United States) B Pera	6	6
(United States) A Muhammad	6	5	6
2	(United States) L Davis	0	7	4

Quarterfinals
SE	(United States) T Townsend	3	6	6
4	(Russia) A Panova	6	1	4
Q	(United States) B Pera
(United States) A Muhammad	w/o

Semifinals
SE	(United States) T Townsend	4	6	6
(United States) A Muhammad	6	3	3
