= 2018 Space Coast Pro Tennis Classic =

- Date: 9–15 April
- Edition: 13th
- Category: ITF Women's Circuit
- Prize money: $60,000
- Surface: Clay
- Location: Indian Harbour Beach, United States

Champions

Singles
- (United States) Caroline Dolehide

Doubles
- (Romania) Irina Bara / (Spain) Sílvia Soler Espinosa
← 2017 ·	Space Coast Pro Tennis Classic	· 2019 →

The 2018 Space Coast Pro Tennis Classic was a professional tennis tournament played on outdoor clay courts. It was the thirteenth edition of the tournament and was part of the 2018 ITF Women's Circuit. It took place in Indian Harbour Beach, United States, on 9–15 April 2018.

== Singles main draw entrants ==
=== Seeds ===
Country	Player	Rank^{1}	Seed
USA	Madison Brengle	80	1
USA	Kristie Ahn	107	2
SVK	Jana Čepelová	116	3
USA	Taylor Townsend	118	4
CAN	Françoise Abanda	129	5
TUN	Ons Jabeur	131	6
USA	Caroline Dolehide	142	7
USA	Jamie Loeb	157	8

- ^{1} Rankings as of 2 April 2018.

=== Other entrants ===
The following players received a wildcard into the singles main draw:

- (United States) Quinn Gleason
- (United States) Jessica Pegula
- (United States) Amanda Rodgers
- (United States) Maria Sanchez

The following players received entry from the qualifying draw:

- (United States) Ann Li
- (United States) Nicole Melichar
- (United States) Ingrid Neel
- (France) Emmanuelle Salas

== Champions ==
=== Singles ===
- (United States) Caroline Dolehide def. (Romania) Irina Bara, 6–4, 7–5

=== Doubles ===
- (Romania) Irina Bara / (Spain) Sílvia Soler Espinosa def. (United States) Jessica Pegula / (United States) Maria Sanchez, 6–4, 6–2
