= Nataša Jovanović =

Serbian politician

- Наташа Јовановић

Member of the National Assembly of the Republic of Serbia
- Incumbent
- Assumed office 1 August 2022
- In office 3 June 2016 – 3 August 2020
- In office 22 January 2001 – 31 May 2012

Vice President of the National Assembly of the Republic of Serbia
- In office 26 June 2008 – 1 August 2012
- In office 9 May 2007 – 11 June 2008

Substitute Member of the Parliamentary Assembly of the Council of Europe
- In office 26 June 2006 – 1 October 2012

Member of the Chamber of Citizens in the Assembly of the Federal Republic of Yugoslavia
- In office 10 December 1996 – 7 October 2000

Personal details
- Born: 14 April 1966 (age 60) Kragujevac, SR Serbia, SFR Yugoslavia
- Party: SRS (1992–2021); SNS (2021–present)

Nataša Jovanović (Serbian Cyrillic: Наташа Јовановић; born 14 April 1966) is a Serbian politician. She was a prominent member of the far-right Serbian Radical Party (SRS) for many years until 2021, when she joined the Serbian Progressive Party (SNS). Jovanović is currently serving her seventh term in the Serbian parliament.

== Early life and career ==
Jovanović was born in Kragujevac, in what was then the Socialist Republic of Serbia in the Socialist Federal Republic of Yugoslavia. She was employed with Zastava Impeks from 1987 to 1989 and was a tour guide with the agencies Holidej and Kontiki from 1991 to 1996.

== Politician ==
=== Serbian Radical Party ===
During the 1990s, the political culture of Serbia was dominated by the authoritarian rule of Socialist Party of Serbia (SPS) leader Slobodan Milošević and his allies.

Jovanović joined the Serbian Radical Party in 1992 and appeared in the twenty-fourth position (out of twenty-nine) on its electoral list for Kragujevac in the 1993 Serbian parliamentary election. The Radicals won five seats in the division, and she was not selected for a mandate. (From 1992 to 2000, Serbia's electoral law stipulated that one-third of parliamentary mandates would be assigned to candidates from successful lists in numerical order, while the remaining two-thirds would be distributed amongst other candidates at the discretion of the sponsoring parties. It was common practice for the latter mandates to be awarded out of order. Jovanović could in theory have been given an "optional" mandate, but she was not.)

==== Yugoslavian parliamentarian (1996–2000) ====
The Socialist Federal Republic of Yugoslavia ceased to exist in 1992 and was succeeded by the Federal Republic of Yugoslavia, comprising the republics of Serbia and Montenegro. Jovanović led the Radical Party's list for Kragujevac in the 1996 election for the Yugoslavian assembly's Chamber of Citizens and was elected when the SRS won a single seat in the division. The Socialist Party's alliance won the election, and the Radicals initially served in opposition. In 1998, the SRS joined a coalition government led by the Socialists in Serbia, and the following year the party also joined the governing coalition at the federal level in Yugoslavia.

In December 1998, Jovanoviċ was one of nineteen Serbian politicians denied entry to European Union (EU) countries for what was described as her role in bringing about a restrictive new law on public information. During this time, she was the chair of the Radical Party's regional board in Šumadija.

Jovanović led the Radical Party's list for Kragujevac again in the 2000 Yugoslavian general election and was defeated when the party failed to win any seats in the division. She also sought election to the Kragujevac city assembly in the concurrent 2000 Serbian local elections and, like all Radical Party party candidates in the city for this cycle, was defeated. (This was the last regular local election cycle in which candidates were elected for single-member constituencies. All subsequent cycles have been held under proportional representation.)

Both the Yugoslavian parliamentary election and the local elections were overshadowed by the 2000 Yugoslavian presidential election, in which Slobodan Milošević fell from power after being defeated by Vojislav Koštunica of the Democratic Opposition of Serbia (DOS). The Serbian government fell after Milošević's defeat in the Yugoslavian vote, and a new Serbian parliamentary election was called for December 2000. Serbia's electoral laws were reformed prior to the vote, such that the entire country became a single electoral district and all mandates were awarded to candidates on successful lists at the discretion of the sponsoring parties or coalitions, irrespective of numerical order.

==== Serbian parliamentarian (2001–12) ====
Jovanović received the fourteenth position on the Radical Party's list for the 2000 Serbian parliamentary election and was awarded a mandate after the list won twenty-three out of 250 seats. She took her seat when the new assembly convened in January 2001. The Democratic Opposition of Serbia won a landslide victory in this election, and the Radicals served in opposition.

The Radical Party often took an obstructionist approach in the national assembly after the 2000 election. In April 2001, Jovanović refused to leave the floor after exceeding her allotted time to speak, leading to the assembly being adjourned. On another occasion, she splashed water on speaker Nataša Mićić during a contentious debate. She took part in a rally outside the legislature in October 2003, saying that the Radical Party would seek to bring down the "criminal" DOS government as soon as possible.

Jovanović appeared in the twelfth position on the SRS's list in the 2003 parliamentary election and was again included in her party's delegation when the list won eighty-two seats. Although the Radicals were the largest party in the assembly after the election, they fell short of a majority and ultimately remained in opposition. In her second term, Jovanović was deputy chair of the committee on trade and tourism and a member of the defence and security committee and the committee on gender equality.

Jovanović led the Radical Party's electoral list for Kragujevac in the 2004 Serbian local elections and was elected when the list won thirteen out of eighty-seven seats, placing third against Veroljub Stevanović's multi-party alliance led by the Serbian Renewal Movement (SPO). The Radicals did not participate in the city's governing coalition and served in opposition at this level as well.

At a February 2006 rally, Jovanović described Ratko Mladić, at the time a fugitive and accused Serbian war criminal, as "the pride of the Serbian nation, unlike those in power."

Jovanović received the thirty-second position on the Radical Party's list in the 2007 parliamentary election and was given a mandate for a third term when the list won eighty-one seats. As in 2003, the Radicals won the greatest number of seats but fell short of a majority. After the election, Jovanović led the Radical Party's negotiating team in pro forma talks with Democratic Party (DS) Serbian president Boris Tadić on the formation of a new ministry; she argued that a member of the Radical Party should be nominated for prime minister and that Tadić should resign due to a poor showing by his party. This advice was predictably not taken. The DS, the Democratic Party of Serbia (DSS) and G17 Plus instead formed a coalition government, and the Radicals remained in opposition. This notwithstanding, Jovanović was chosen as a deputy speaker of the assembly in May 2007. She also served on the defence committee and the culture and information committee.

The alliance between the DS and the DSS collapsed in early 2008, and a new parliamentary election was called for May of that year. Jovanović was given the twelfth position on the Radical Party's list and was chosen afterward for a fourth assembly term. The overall results of the election were inconclusive, and the Radicals, Socialists, and DSS initially held negotiations on forming a new administration. The talks were unsuccessful; the Socialists instead joined a coalition government with the DS-led For a European Serbia (ZES) alliance, and the Radicals once again remained in opposition. Jovanović was chosen for another term as deputy speaker in June 2008. She was also a member of the defence committee, the foreign affairs committee, the trade and tourism committee, the assembly working group on children's rights, and the parliamentary friendship group with Russia.

She again led the SRS's list for Kragujevac in the 2008 Serbian local elections, which were held concurrently with the parliamentary vote, and took a mandate after the list won eighteen seats, finishing a distant second against Stevanović's alliance.

After the 2008 parliamentary election, the Tadić government arrested former Bosnian Serb leader Radovan Karadžić and extradited him to the International Criminal Tribunal for the former Yugoslavia (ICTY) on war crimes charges. Jovanović later said of Tadić in a parliamentary debate, “Let the sun never shine upon him, let his name be deleted, let God punish him. He is the biggest traitor.” On another occasion, she defended Radical Party leader Vojislav Šešelj's suggestion that the person convicted of killing former Serbian prime minister Zoran Đinđić could be recognized as a Serb hero on par with Gavrilo Princip. (Technically, Šešelj did not consciously praise the killer of Đinđić, as was widely reported. He actually said, “I believe that Zvezdan Jovanović was falsely sentenced but if it wasn’t the case he would enjoy the glory of one Gavrilo Princip in Serbian history.")

The Radical Party experienced a significant split in late 2008, with several leading figures joining the more moderate Serbian Progressive Party (SNS) under the leadership of Tomislav Nikolić and Aleksandar Vučić. Jovanović remained with the Radicals and was considered a prominent hardline ally of Šešelj.

Serbia's electoral system was reformed again in 2011, such that all parliamentary mandates were awarded to candidates on successful lists in numerical order. Jovanović received the twelfth position on the party's electoral list in the 2012 Serbian parliamentary election. Weakened by the split four years earlier, the list did not cross the electoral threshold for assembly representation. Jovanović also led the SRS list for Kragujevac in the concurrent 2012 local elections. This list, too, failed to cross the threshold.

She later appeared in the ninth position on the Radical Party's electoral list in the 2014 Serbian parliamentary election. As in 2012, the list did not cross the threshold.

==== Substitute member of the PACE (2006–12) ====
In June 2006, Jovanović was appointed as a substitute member of Serbia's delegation to the Parliamentary Assembly of the Council of Europe (PACE). She was re-appointed after the 2007 and 2008 elections. In the PACE, she initially served on the committee on economic affairs and development and the committee for equal opportunities for women and men. On 23 January 2012, she was re-assigned as a full member of the committee on equality and non-discrimination. She did not serve with any assembly grouping, and her term came to an end on 1 October 2012.

==== Return to the Serbian parliament and after (2016–21) ====
The Radicals won twenty-two seats in the 2016 parliamentary election, returning to the national assembly after a four-year absence. Jovanović again appeared in the ninth position on the party's list and was elected for a fifth term. The Serbian Progressive Party and its allies won a majority victory. As in 2007, Jovanović represented the SRS in pro forma discussions for a new government, joining her party colleague Nemanja Šarović for a consultation session with president Tomislav Nikolić. Jovanović and Šarović used their time to demand that Nikolić resign, and the meeting was reported to have ended after thirty seconds. The Radicals ultimately served for another term in opposition.

In the 2016–20 parliament, Jovanović was a member of the foreign affairs committee and the committee on the rights of the child, a deputy member of the defence and internal affairs committee, a member of Serbia's delegation to the NATO Parliamentary Assembly (where Serbia has observer status), and a member of the friendship groups with China, Russia, and Venezuela. In 2018, she caused a minor furore at a meeting of the NATO assembly in Poland by delivering a speech strongly supporting Vladimir Putin and his policies. Dragan Šormaz, the leader of Serbia's delegation, criticized her speech as "unstatesmanlike" and as having caused astonishment among those present.

Jovanović appeared in the eighth position on the SRS's list in the 2020 parliamentary election and lost her seat when the list once again fell below the electoral threshold. In July 2021, the Serbian media reported that Jovanović was no longer a member of the Radical Party and in fact had left the party some time earlier. She described her decision as a personal matter.

=== Serbian Progressive Party ===
Jovanović announced in November 2021 that she had joined the Serbian Progressive Party.

==== Serbian parliamentarian (2022–present) ====
Jovanović appeared in the seventy-first position on the SNS's list in the 2022 Serbian parliamentary election and was elected to a sixth term when the list won a strong plurality victory with 120 seats. The Progressives formed a coalition government with the Socialists and other parties after the election, and, for the first time in her tenure as a member of the national assembly, Jovanović served as a government supporter. In this sitting of parliament, she was a member of the foreign affairs committee and the culture and information committee, a deputy member of the committee on Kosovo and Metohija and the European integration committee, a deputy member of Serbia's delegation to the NATO assembly, the leader of Serbia's friendship group with Portugal, and a member of its friendship groups with Austria, China, Cyprus, Egypt, France, Germany, Spain, and Turkey

She was promoted to the forty-fifth position on the SNS's list in the 2023 Serbian parliamentary election and was re-elected when the list won a majority victory with 129 seats. She is now a member of the foreign affairs committee and the culture and information committee, a deputy member of the committee on Kosovo and Metohija, a member of Serbia's delegation to the NATO assembly, the leader of Serbia's friendship group with Portugal, and a member of the friendship groups with Austria, Azerbaijan, China, Cyprus, France, Greece, Italy and the Holy See, Spain, and the United States of America.

Jovanović also appeared in the fifth position on the SNS's list for Kragujevac in the 2023 Serbian local elections, which were held concurrently with the parliamentary vote, and was re-elected to the city assembly when the list won thirty-eight seats. She continues to serve in this body as of 2025.

== Electoral record ==
=== Local (Kragujevac) ===
2000 City Assembly of Kragujevac election: Division 50 (MZ Koricani, MZ Veliko Polje)
| Candidate | Party |
|---|---|
| Vukosav Aleksić Vule | Citizens' Group: Together for Kragujevac |
| Dr. Marina Petrović | Socialist Party of Serbia–Yugoslav Left (Affiliation: Yugoslav Left) (***WINNER***) |
| Vladan Jevtović | Democratic Opposition of Serbia |
| Nataša Jovanović | Serbian Radical Party |
Total
