= Marina Petrović =

Serbian politician

Marina Petrović (Serbian Cyrillic: Марина Петровић; born 1 May 1969) is a Serbian medical doctor and former politician. She served in the Serbian parliament from 1999 to 2001 as a member of the Yugoslav Left (JUL).

== Early life and medical career ==
Petrović was born in Kragujevac, in what was then the Socialist Republic of Serbia in the Socialist Federal Republic of Yugoslavia. Raised in the city, she graduated from the University of Kragujevac Faculty of Medicine in 1994 and later received her master's degree(1999) and Ph.D. (2007) from the same institution. She became a full professor of internal medicine at the Faculty of Medicine in 2017, is the manager of the pulmonology clinic at the Clinical Centre of Kragujevac, and has published widely in her field.

== Politician ==
Petrović appeared in the third position on a coalition electoral list of the Socialist Party of Serbia (SPS), the Yugoslav Left, and New Democracy (ND) in Kragujevac for the 1997 Serbian parliamentary election. The list won three out of eight seats in the division, and she was not initially included in her party's assembly delegation. (From 1992 to 2000, Serbia's electoral law stipulated that one-third of parliamentary mandates would be assigned to candidates from successful lists in numerical order, while the remaining two-thirds would be distributed amongst other candidates at the discretion of the sponsoring parties. It was common practice for the latter mandates to be awarded out of order. Petrović's list position did not give her the automatic right to a mandate.)

New Democracy later ended its alliance with the Socialist Party of Serbia and the Yugoslav Left, and in July 1999 the ND delegates in the Serbian assembly had their mandates revoked under controversial circumstances. Petrović was awarded a replacement mandate for a ND delegate in the Kragujevac division on 15 July 1999. The SPS, JUL, and Serbian Radical Party (SRS) formed a coalition government in Serbia during this time, and Petrović supported the government in the assembly. She also served on the JUL's main board.

During the 1990s, Serbia's political culture was dominated by the authoritarian rule of SPS leader Slobodan Milošević and his allies. Milošević fell from power after being defeated by Democratic Opposition of Serbia (DOS) candidate Vojislav Koštunica in the 2000 Yugoslavian presidential election. Serbia's government fell after Milošević's defeat in the Yugoslavian vote, and a provisional government comprising the SPS, the DOS, and the Serbian Renewal Movement (SPO) took office pending a new election.

Petrović was elected to the Kragujevac city assembly in the 2000 Serbian local elections, which took place concurrently with the Yugoslavian vote. The DOS won a majority victory in the city, and she served afterward in opposition.

She was not a candidate in the 2000 Serbian parliamentary election, and her term in the national assembly ended when the new parliament convened in January 2001. She continued to serve as a JUL delegate in the Kragujevac city assembly until 2004, making her one of the last party members to hold elected office in Serbia. The JUL did not contest the 2004 local elections in Kragujevac, and her term in the city assembly ended that year.

== Electoral record ==
=== Local (Kragujevac) ===
2000 City Assembly of Kragujevac election: Division 50 (MZ Koricani, MZ Veliko Polje)
Candidate	Party
Vukosav Aleksić Vule	Citizens' Group: Together for Kragujevac
Dr. Marina Petrović	Socialist Party of Serbia–Yugoslav Left (Affiliation: Yugoslav Left) (***WINNER***)
Vladan Jevtović	Democratic Opposition of Serbia
Nataša Jovanović	Serbian Radical Party
Total
