= 2014 Audi Melbourne Pro Tennis Classic – Singles =

Singles
- 2014 Audi Melbourne Pro Tennis Classic

Final
- Champion: (United States) Taylor Townsend
- Runner-up: (Kazakhstan) Yulia Putintseva
- Score: 6–1, 6–1

Events
Singles	Doubles
← 2013 ·	Audi Melbourne Pro Tennis Classic	· 2015 →

Petra Rampre was the defending champion, but lost in the first round to Taylor Townsend.

Townsend went on to win the tournament, defeating Yulia Putintseva in the final, 6–1, 6–1.

== Seeds ==
1. (New Zealand) Marina Erakovic (quarterfinals; retired)
2. (Portugal) Michelle Larcher de Brito (quarterfinals)
3. (United States) ~~Melanie Oudin~~ (withdrew)
4. (Paraguay) Verónica Cepede Royg (second round)
5. (United States) Irina Falconi (first round)
6. (United States) Grace Min (first round)
7. (Kazakhstan) Yulia Putintseva (final)
8. (United States) Allie Kiick (quarterfinals)

== Main draw ==
=== Key ===
- Q = Qualifier
- WC = Wild card
- LL = Lucky loser
- Alt = Alternate
- ITF = ITF entry
- PR = Protected ranking
- SR = Special ranking
- SE = Special exempt
- JE = Junior exempt
- JR = Junior Accelerator Programme entrant
- CO = College Accelerator Programme entrant
- NG = Next Gen Accelerator Program entrant
- w/o = Walkover
- r = Retired
- d = Defaulted

=== Finals ===
Semifinals
(Estonia) Anett Kontaveit	6	6^{4}	4
SE	(United States) Taylor Townsend	3	7^{7}	6
(Canada) Heidi El Tabakh	6	3	3
7	(Kazakhstan) Yulia Putintseva	4	6	6

Final
SE	(United States) Taylor Townsend	6	6
7	(Kazakhstan) Yulia Putintseva	1	1

=== Top half ===
First round
1	(New Zealand) M Erakovic	4	6	6
Q	(United States) S Crawford	6	3	2
(United States) J Cohen	0	1
Q	(Norway) U Eikeri	6	6
(Paraguay) M González	3	0^{r}
(Estonia) A Kontaveit	6	3
(United States) N Gibbs	6	3	6
5	(United States) I Falconi	3	6	0
LL	(United States) E Halbauer	6^{4}	1^{r}
(Ukraine) S Kovalets	7^{7}	4
SE	(United States) T Townsend	6	4	6
(Slovenia) P Rampre	2	6	0
(Chinese Taipei) C-y Hsu	6	2	2
WC	(United States) S Marand	4	6	6
WC	(United States) J Kuhlman	2	2
8	(United States) A Kiick	6	6

Second round
1	(New Zealand) M Erakovic	6	6
Q	(Norway) U Eikeri	3	2
(Estonia) A Kontaveit	6	6
(United States) N Gibbs	4	1
(Ukraine) S Kovalets	3^{r}
SE	(United States) T Townsend	4
WC	(United States) S Marand	4	3
8	(United States) A Kiick	6	6

Quarterfinals
1	(New Zealand) M Erakovic	6	2	0^{r}
(Estonia) A Kontaveit	2	6	0
SE	(United States) T Townsend	6	6
8	(United States) A Kiick	2	2

Semifinals
(Estonia) A Kontaveit	6	6^{4}	4
SE	(United States) T Townsend	3	7^{7}	6

=== Bottom half ===
First round
6	(United States) G Min	5	5
Q	(Bulgaria) D Evtimova	7	7
(Canada) H El Tabakh	4	6	6
Q	(Belgium) E Mertens	6	2	1
(Bulgaria) E Kostova	5	2
(United States) J Boserup	7	6
(Russia) O Puchkova	4	2
4	(Paraguay) V Cepede Royg	6	6
7	(Kazakhstan) Y Putintseva	6	6
(Japan) M Hibi	2	4
WC	(United States) A Will	4	4
(United States) M Sanchez	6	6
WC	(United States) A Muhammad	6	4	3
(Austria) M Klaffner	4	6	6
(Belarus) I Kremen	6	1	2
2	(Portugal) M Larcher de Brito	2	6	6

Second round
Q	(Bulgaria) D Evtimova	2	3
(Canada) H El Tabakh	6	6
(United States) J Boserup	7^{7}	6
4	(Paraguay) V Cepede Royg	6^{4}	3
7	(Kazakhstan) Y Putintseva	6	6
(United States) M Sanchez	3	4
(Austria) M Klaffner	3	3
2	(Portugal) M Larcher de Brito	6	6

Quarterfinals
(Canada) H El Tabakh	6	3	6
(United States) J Boserup	2	6	3
7	(Kazakhstan) Y Putintseva	6	7^{7}
2	(Portugal) M Larcher de Brito	3	6^{5}

Semifinals
(Canada) H El Tabakh	6	3	3
7	(Kazakhstan) Y Putintseva	4	6	6
