= 2015 Revolution Technologies Pro Tennis Classic – Doubles =

Doubles
- 2015 Revolution Technologies Pro Tennis Classic

Final
- Champions: (United States) Maria Sanchez (United States) Taylor Townsend
- Runners-up: (Russia) Angelina Gabueva (United States) Alexandra Stevenson
- Score: 6–0, 6–1

Events
| Singles | Doubles |
| ← 2014 · | Revolution Technologies Pro Tennis Classic | · 2016 → |

Asia Muhammad and Taylor Townsend were the defending champions, but Muhammad chose to participate at the 2015 Open GDF Suez de Cagnes-sur-Mer Alpes-Maritimes instead. Townsend partnered Maria Sanchez and successfully defended her title, defeating Angelina Gabueva and Alexandra Stevenson in the final, 6–0, 6–1.

== Seeds ==
1. (United States) Maria Sanchez / (United States) Taylor Townsend (champions)
2. (Chinese Taipei) Hsu Chieh-yu / (Australia) Jessica Moore (semifinals)
3. (Argentina) Florencia Molinero / (Romania) Patricia Maria Țig (first round; retired)
4. (Brazil) Gabriela Cé / (United States) Sanaz Marand (semifinals)

== Draw ==
=== Key ===
- Q = Qualifier
- WC = Wild card
- LL = Lucky loser
- Alt = Alternate
- SE = Special exempt
- PR = Protected ranking
- ITF = ITF entry
- JE = Junior exempt
- w/o = Walkover
- r = Retired
- d = Defaulted
- SR = Special ranking

First round
1 | (United States) M Sanchez (United States) T Townsend | 6 | 6
(United States) S Crawford (United States) E Harman | 3 | 3
(United States) S Kenin (United States) A Morozova | 5 | 6 | [3]
(United States) J Boserup (United States) J Pegula | 7 | 4 | [10]
4 | (Brazil) G Cé (United States) S Marand | 6 | 6
(United States) M Norris (United States) E Raszkiewicz | 3 | 4
(Ukraine) O Ianchuk (Russia) I Khromacheva | 7^{7} | 6
(United States) A Daniell (Canada) P Januskova | 6^{3} | 2
(United States) I Neel (United States) E Oosterhout | 6 | 7^{7}
WC | (United States) A Belaya (United States) C Woodson | 3 | 6^{5}
(Russia) A Gabueva (United States) A Stevenson | 2
3 | (Argentina) F Molinero (Romania) PM Țig | 5^{r}
(Australia) S Peers (United States) R Valdes | 4 | 2
(United States) A Kiick (Australia) S Sanders | 6 | 6
(Poland) J Jegiołka (Argentina) P Ormaechea | 6 | 1 | [8]
2 | (Chinese Taipei) C-y Hsu (Australia) J Moore | 4 | 6 | [10]

Quarterfinals
1 | (United States) M Sanchez (United States) T Townsend | 6 | 7^{7}
(United States) J Boserup (United States) J Pegula | 3 | 6^{3}
4 | (Brazil) G Cé (United States) S Marand | w/o
(Ukraine) O Ianchuk (Russia) I Khromacheva
(United States) I Neel (United States) E Oosterhout | 4 | 2
(Russia) A Gabueva (United States) A Stevenson | 6 | 6
(United States) A Kiick (Australia) S Sanders | 7^{7} | 6^{4} | [4]
2 | (Chinese Taipei) C-y Hsu (Australia) J Moore | 6^{4} | 7^{7} | [10]

Semifinals
1 | (United States) M Sanchez (United States) T Townsend | 0 | 6 | [10]
4 | (Brazil) G Cé (United States) S Marand | 6 | 3 | [7]
(Russia) A Gabueva (United States) A Stevenson | 3 | 6 | [10]
2 | (Chinese Taipei) C-y Hsu (Australia) J Moore | 6 | 1 | [7]

Final
1 | (United States) M Sanchez (United States) T Townsend | 6 | 6
(Russia) A Gabueva (United States) A Stevenson | 0 | 1
