= 2014 Audi Melbourne Pro Tennis Classic – Doubles =

Doubles
- 2014 Audi Melbourne Pro Tennis Classic

Final
- Champions: (United States) Asia Muhammad (United States) Taylor Townsend
- Runners-up: (United States) Jan Abaza (United States) Sanaz Marand
- Score: 6–2, 6–1

Events
| Singles | Doubles |
| ← 2013 · | Audi Melbourne Pro Tennis Classic | · 2015 → |

Jan Abaza and Louisa Chirico were the defending champions, having won the event in 2013, but Chirico chose not to participate. Abaza partnered with Sanaz Marand, but lost in the final to Asia Muhammad and Taylor Townsend, 6–2, 6–1.

== Seeds ==
1. (United States) Irina Falconi / (United States) Maria Sanchez (semifinals)
2. (United States) Asia Muhammad / (United States) Taylor Townsend (champions)
3. (United States) Julia Cohen / (United States) Allie Will (quarterfinals)
4. (United States) Nicole Melichar / (United States) Natalie Pluskota (first round)

== Draw ==
=== Key ===
- Q = Qualifier
- WC = Wild card
- LL = Lucky loser
- Alt = Alternate
- SE = Special exempt
- PR = Protected ranking
- ITF = ITF entry
- JE = Junior exempt
- w/o = Walkover
- r = Retired
- d = Defaulted
- SR = Special ranking

First round
1 | (United States) I Falconi (United States) M Sanchez | 6 | 6
(Estonia) A Kontaveit (Belarus) I Kremen | 3 | 3
(Canada) H El Tabakh (United States) A Kiick | 1 | 6 | [5]
(United States) D Lao (United States) K Wong | 6 | 4 | [10]
4 | (United States) N Melichar (United States) N Pluskota | 3 | 6 | [5]
(United States) J Abaza (United States) S Marand | 6 | 4 | [10]
(United States) J Cako (Australia) S Peers | 3 | 6 | [7]
(Chinese Taipei) C-y Hsu (Bulgaria) E Kostova | 6 | 3 | [10]
WC | (United States) J Kuhlman (United States) P Porter | 6 | 6
WC | (United States) A Belaya (United States) C Woodson | 1 | 1
(United States) E Harman (Japan) M Hibi | 2 | 6 | [7]
3 | (United States) J Cohen (United States) A Will | 6 | 2 | [10]
WC | (United States) J Elie (United States) L Litvak | 6 | 0 | [7]
(Brazil) MF Alves (Slovakia) Z Zlochová | 3 | 6 | [10]
(Serbia) T Čurović (United States) C Scholl | 2 | 0
2 | (United States) A Muhammad (United States) T Townsend | 6 | 6

Quarterfinals
1 | (United States) I Falconi (United States) M Sanchez | 6 | 6
(United States) D Lao (United States) K Wong | 2 | 1
(United States) J Abaza (United States) S Marand | 2 | 7 | [10]
(Chinese Taipei) C-y Hsu (Bulgaria) E Kostova | 6 | 5 | [8]
WC | (United States) J Kuhlman (United States) P Porter | 7^{7} | 6
3 | (United States) J Cohen (United States) A Will | 6^{5} | 4
(Brazil) MF Alves (Slovakia) Z Zlochová | 0 | 3
2 | (United States) A Muhammad (United States) T Townsend | 6 | 6

Semifinals
1 | (United States) I Falconi (United States) M Sanchez | 6^{1} | 6 | [8]
(United States) J Abaza (United States) S Marand | 7^{7} | 3 | [10]
WC | (United States) J Kuhlman (United States) P Porter | 3 | 6 | [5]
2 | (United States) A Muhammad (United States) T Townsend | 6 | 4 | [10]

Final
(United States) J Abaza (United States) S Marand | 2 | 1
2 | (United States) A Muhammad (United States) T Townsend | 6 | 6
