= Angelina Gabueva =

Russian tennis player

Angelina Gabueva Ангелина Габуева
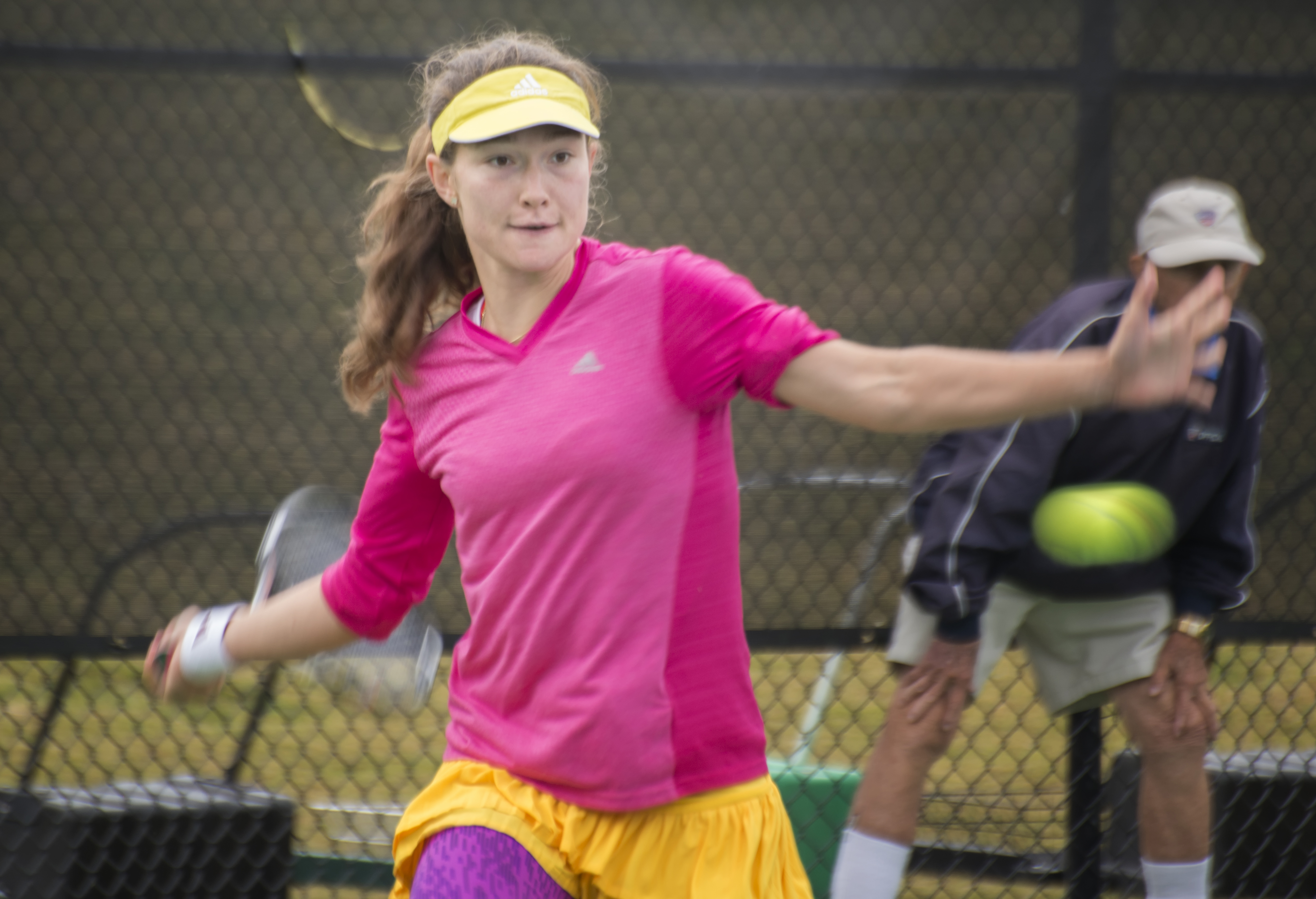
- Gabueva at the 2014 Rock Hills Open
- Full name: Angelina Alexandrovna Gabueva
- Country (sports): Russia
- Born: 7 December 1988 (age 37) Vladikavkaz, Russia
- Height: 1.74 m (5 ft 9 in)
- Plays: Right-handed
- Prize money: $179,195

Singles
- Career record: 317–344
- Career titles: 2 ITF
- Highest ranking: No. 423 (17 June 2013)

Doubles
- Career record: 263–254
- Career titles: 17 ITF
- Highest ranking: No. 94 (26 September 2022)

Angelina Alexandrovna Gabueva (Russian: Ангелина Александровна Габуева; born 7 December 1988) is an inactive Russian tennis player. Gabueva has won two singles titles and 17 doubles titles on the ITF Circuit. On 17 June 2013, she reached her best singles ranking of world No. 423. On 26 September 2022, she peaked at No. 94 in the WTA doubles rankings.

== Career ==
Gabueva made her WTA Tour debut at the 2006 Tashkent Open, partnering Diana Narzykulova in doubles, they lost their first-round match against fellow Russians Anastasia Rodionova and Galina Voskoboeva. In singles she also played in her first WTA Tour qualifying draw.

In October 2021, Gabueva and Anastasia Zakharova reached their first WTA tournament final at the Astana Open in which they lost to Anna-Lena Friedsam and Monica Niculescu.

Her first WTA Tour-level main-draw match in singles came at the 2022 Internationaux de Strasbourg as a lucky loser. She then qualified for the 2023 edition in Strasbourg but lost to wildcard entrant Anastasia Pavlyuchenkova.

== WTA Tour finals ==
=== Doubles: 2 (2 runner-ups) ===
Legend WTA 250 (0–2)	Finals by surface Hard (0–2)

Result	Date	Tournament	Tier	Surface	Partner	Opponents	Score
Loss	Oct 2021	Astana Open, Kazakhstan	WTA 250	Hard (i)	(Russia) Anastasia Zakharova	(Germany) Anna-Lena Friedsam (Romania) Monica Niculescu	2–6, 6–4, [5–10]
Loss	Jul 2022	Prague Open, Czech Republic	WTA 250	Hard	Anastasia Zakharova	Anastasia Potapova; Yana Sizikova	3–6, 4–6

== WTA 125 finals ==
=== Doubles: 2 (2 runner-ups) ===
Result	Date	Tournament	Surface	Partner	Opponents	Score
Loss	Dec 2022	Andorrà Open, Andorra	Hard (i)	Anastasia Zakharova	(Spain) Cristina Bucșa (Poland) Weronika Falkowska	6–7^{(4–7)}, 1–6
Loss	Jun 2023	Internacional de Valencia, Spain	Clay	Irina Khromacheva	(Spain) Aliona Bolsova (Venezuela) Andrea Gámiz	4–6, 6–4, [7–10]

== ITF Circuit finals ==
=== Singles: 4 (2 titles, 2 runner-ups) ===
Legend $10/15k tournaments (2–2)	Finals by surface Hard (2–2)

Result	W–L	Date	Tournament	Tier	Surface	Opponent	Score
Win	1–0	Aug 2005	ITF Guayaquil, Ecuador	10,000	Hard	(Italy) Nicole Clerico	6–2, 4–6, 6–4
Win	2–0	Aug 2009	ITF Nonthaburi, Thailand	10,000	Hard	(South Korea) Yoo Mi	6–4, 6–3
Loss	2–1	Apr 2012	ITF Antalya, Turkey	10,000	Hard	(United States) Nicole Melichar	7–5, 4–6, 1–6
Loss	2–2	Apr 2018	ITF Sharm El Sheikh, Egypt	15,000	Hard	(Slovenia) Nastja Kolar	6–2, 4–6, 0–6

=== Doubles: 34 (17 titles, 17 runner-ups) ===
Legend W100 tournaments (0–1) W50 tournaments (0–1) W25 tournaments (6–4) W10/15 tournaments (11–11)	Finals by surface Hard (12–9) Clay (5–8)

Result	W–L	Date	Tournament	Tier	Surface	Partner	Opponents	Score
Loss	0–1	Feb 2007	ITF Mallorca, Spain	10k	Clay	(Germany) Tatjana Priachin	(Czech Republic) Simona Dobrá (Romania) Antonia Xenia Tout	1–6, 2–6
Win	1–1	Aug 2007	ITF Caracas, Venezuela	10k	Hard	(Venezuela) Mariana Muci	(South Africa) Tegan Edwards (United States) Lena Litvak	6–2, 6–2
Loss	1–2	Oct 2007	ITF Augusta, United States	25k	Hard	(Russia) Alisa Kleybanova	(United States) Madison Brengle (United States) Kristy Frilling	3–6, 3–6
Loss	1–3	Oct 2009	ITF Williamsburg, US	10k	Clay	(Bulgaria) Svetlana Krivencheva	(Brazil) Ana-Maria Moura (United States) Gira Schofield	6–3, 0–6, [6–10]
Win	2–3	Nov 2009	ITF Havana, Cuba	10k	Hard	(Ecuador) Mariana Correa	(Austria) Lisa Summerer (Austria) Janina Toljan	6–2, 7–6^{(6)}
Win	3–3	Oct 2010	ITF Williamsburg, US	10k	Clay	(Bulgaria) Svetlana Krivencheva	(Georgia (country)) Salome Devidze (Georgia (country)) Magda Okruashvili	6–4, 3–6, [10–8]
Loss	3–4	Jun 2011	ITF Bethany Beach, US	10k	Clay	(Brazil) Maria Fernanda Alves	(United States) Alexandra Hirsch (United States) Lena Litvak	5–7, 6–3, [8–10]
Loss	3–5	Mar 2012	ITF Antalya, Turkey	10k	Clay	(Russia) Margarita Lazareva	(Romania) Cristina Dinu (Romania) Diana Enache	0–6, 7–5, [3–10]
Loss	3–6	Apr 2012	ITF Antalya, Turkey	10k	Hard	(United States) Nicole Melichar	(Japan) Yuka Mori (Japan) Kaori Onishi	2–6, 4–6
Loss	3–7	May 2012	ITF Ra'anana, Israel	10k	Hard	(Ukraine) Vladyslava Zanosiyenko	(Israel) Ester Masuri (Israel) Ekaterina Tour	5–7, 6–1, [5–10]
Win	4–7	Oct 2012	ITF Gainesville, US	10k	Clay	(Bolivia) María Fernanda Álvarez	(United States) Kristi Boxx (United States) Keri Wong	7–6^{(4)}, 5–7, [10–7]
Win	5–7	Oct 2012	Classic of Troy, US	25k	Hard	(Russia) Arina Rodionova	(Canada) Sharon Fichman (Canada) Marie-Ève Pelletier	6–4, 6–4
Win	6–7	Jan 2013	ITF Port St. Lucie, US	25k	Clay	(United States) Allie Will	(Argentina) Florencia Molinero (Venezuela) Adriana Pérez	4–6, 6–2, [10–7]
Loss	6–8	Apr 2013	ITF Antalya, Turkey	10k	Hard	(Belgium) Catherine Chantraine	(Argentina) Andrea Benítez (Brazil) Carla Forte	1–6, 4–6
Loss	6–9	Jun 2013	ITF Bukhara, Uzbekistan	25k	Hard	(Ukraine) Veronika Kapshay	(Japan) Eri Hozumi (Japan) Makoto Ninomiya	6–3, 5–7, [8–10]
Loss	6–10	May 2015	ITF Indian Harbour Beach, US	50k	Clay	(United States) Alexandra Stevenson	(United States) Maria Sanchez (United States) Taylor Townsend	0–6, 1–6
Loss	6–11	Sep 2015	Batumi Ladies Open, Georgia	25k	Hard	(Ukraine) Elizaveta Ianchuk	(Russia) Natela Dzalamidze (Russia) Alena Tarasova	7–5, 1–6, [7–10]
Loss	6–12	Jun 2016	ITF Kazan, Russia	10k	Clay	(Russia) Amina Anshba	(Russia) Olga Doroshina (Russia) Yana Sizikova	4–6, 7–6^{(8)}, [5–10]
Win	7–12	Jul 2016	ITF Niš, Serbia	10k	Clay	(Russia) Amina Anshba	(Serbia) Tamara Čurović (Serbia) Natalija Kostić	7–5, 7–5
Win	8–12	Jul 2016	ITF Astana, Kazakhstan	10k	Hard	(Russia) Anastasia Frolova	(Belarus) Sviatlana Pirazhenka (Ukraine) Alyona Sotnikova	6–2, 6–3
Win	9–12	Aug 2016	ITF Moscow, Russia	10k	Clay	(Russia) Amina Anshba	(Armenia) Ani Amiraghyan (Russia) Daria Lodikova	6–4, 6–4
Loss	9–13	Oct 2016	ITF Chenzhou, China	25k	Hard	(Georgia (country)) Sofia Shapatava	(United States) Jacqueline Cako (Bulgaria) Aleksandrina Naydenova	6–3, 4–6, [6–10]
Loss	9–14	Mar 2017	ITF Nanjing, China	15k	Hard	(Russia) Olga Puchkova	(China) Sun Xuliu (China) Sun Ziyue	3–6, 1–6
Loss	9–15	Mar 2017	ITF Heraklion, Greece	15k	Clay	(Russia) Olga Puchkova	(Canada) Charlotte Robillard-Millette (Canada) Carol Zhao	6–7^{(2)}, 6–4, [5–10]
Win	10–15	Mar 2018	ITF Sharm El Sheikh, Egypt	15k	Hard	(Thailand) Kamonwan Buayam	(Romania) Laura-Ioana Andrei (Bulgaria) Julia Terziyska	1–6, 6–4, [10–5]
Win	11–15	Mar 2018	ITF Sharm El Sheikh	15k	Hard	(Thailand) Kamonwan Buayam	(United Kingdom) Jodie Burrage (Sweden) Jacqueline Cabaj Awad	7–5, 5–7, [10–7]
Win	12–15	Mar 2019	ITF Sharm El Sheikh	W15	Hard	(Belarus) Shalimar Talbi	(Croatia) Mariana Dražić (Ukraine) Marianna Zakarlyuk	6–4, 6–4
Win	13–15	Mar 2019	ITF Sharm El Sheikh	W15	Hard	(Germany) Julia Wachaczyk	(Sweden) Linnéa Malmqvist (Russia) Alina Silich	7–5, 7–6^{(5)}
Win	14–15	Oct 2019	ITF Claremont, US	W25	Hard	(United States) Jacqueline Cako	(United States) Hind Abdelouahid (United States) Alyssa Tobita	6–3, 6–7^{(4)}, [10–4]
Win	15–15	Jun 2021	ITF Kazan, Russia	W25	Hard	(Uzbekistan) Nigina Abduraimova	(Belarus) Iryna Shymanovich (Belarus) Shalimar Talbi	6–2, 7–6^{(5)}
Loss	15–16	Jul 2021	ITF Moscow, Russia	W15	Clay	(Uzbekistan) Nigina Abduraimova	(Russia) Daria Mishina (Russia) Anna Morgina	5–7, 6–2, [9–11]
Loss	15–17	Nov 2021	Dubai Tennis Challenge, UAE	W100	Hard	(Russia) Anastasia Zakharova	(Kazakhstan) Anna Danilina (Slovakia) Viktória Kuzmová	6–4, 3–6, [2–10]
Win	16–17	Jun 2022	ITF Tbilisi, Georgia	W25	Hard	Anastasia Zakharova	Darya Astakhova; Anna Kubareva	6–1, 6–2
Win	17–17	Jun 2022	ITF Tbilisi, Georgia	W25	Hard	Anastasia Zakharova	Polina Kudermetova; Sofya Lansere	6–4, 6–3
