= 2017 Revolution Technologies Pro Tennis Classic =

2017 ITF Indian Harbour Beach
- Date: 10–16 April
- Edition: 12th
- Category: ITF Women's Circuit
- Prize money: $80,000
- Surface: Clay
- Location: Indian Harbour Beach, US

Champions

Singles
- (Belarus) Olga Govortsova

Doubles
- (United States) Kristie Ahn / (United States) Quinn Gleason
← 2016 ·	ITF Indian Harbour Beach	· 2018 →

The 2017 Revolution Technologies Pro Tennis Classic was a professional tennis tournament played on outdoor clay courts. It was the twelfth edition of the tournament and part of the 2017 ITF Women's Circuit, offering a total of $80,000 in prize money. It took place in Indian Harbour Beach, Florida, from 10–16 April 2017.

== Singles main draw entrants ==
=== Seeds ===
Country	Player	Rank^{1}	Seed
CAN	Eugenie Bouchard	56	1
USA	Madison Brengle	100	2
USA	Taylor Townsend	104	3
NZL	Marina Erakovic	107	4
TUN	Ons Jabeur	131	5
GBR	Tara Moore	153	6
USA	Jamie Loeb	159	7
RUS	Alla Kudryavtseva	162	8

- ^{1} rankings as of 3 April 2017

=== Other entrants ===
The following players received wildcards into the singles main draw:

- (Canada) Eugenie Bouchard
- (United States) Nicole Coopersmith
- (United States) Victoria Duval
- (Croatia) Ajla Tomljanović

The following players received entry into the singles main draw by a protected ranking:

- (Ukraine) Anhelina Kalinina

The following players received entry from the qualifying draw:

- (United States) Kaitlyn Christian
- (Romania) Alexandra Dulgheru
- (United States) Quinn Gleason
- (United States) Brianna Morgan

== Champions ==
=== Singles ===
- (Belarus) Olga Govortsova def. (United States) Amanda Anisimova, 6–3, 4–6, 6–3

=== Doubles ===
- (United States) Kristie Ahn / (United States) Quinn Gleason def. (Brazil) Laura Pigossi / (Mexico) Renata Zarazúa, 6–3, 6–2
