= Salome Devidze =

Georgian tennis player (born 1986)

Salome Devidze სალომე დევიძე
- Country (sports): Georgia
- Residence: Tbilisi, Georgia
- Born: 2 January 1986 (age 39) Tbilisi, Soviet Union
- Turned pro: 2001
- Plays: Right-handed (double-handed backhand)
- Prize money: US$ 62,174

Singles
- Career record: 217–199
- Career titles: 0
- Highest ranking: No. 254 (26 April 2004)
- Current ranking: No. 1301 (22 February 2021)

Doubles
- Career record: 47–75
- Career titles: 1 ITF
- Highest ranking: No. 250 (10 October 2005)

Team competitions
- Fed Cup: 18–11
- Last updated on: 1 July 2019.

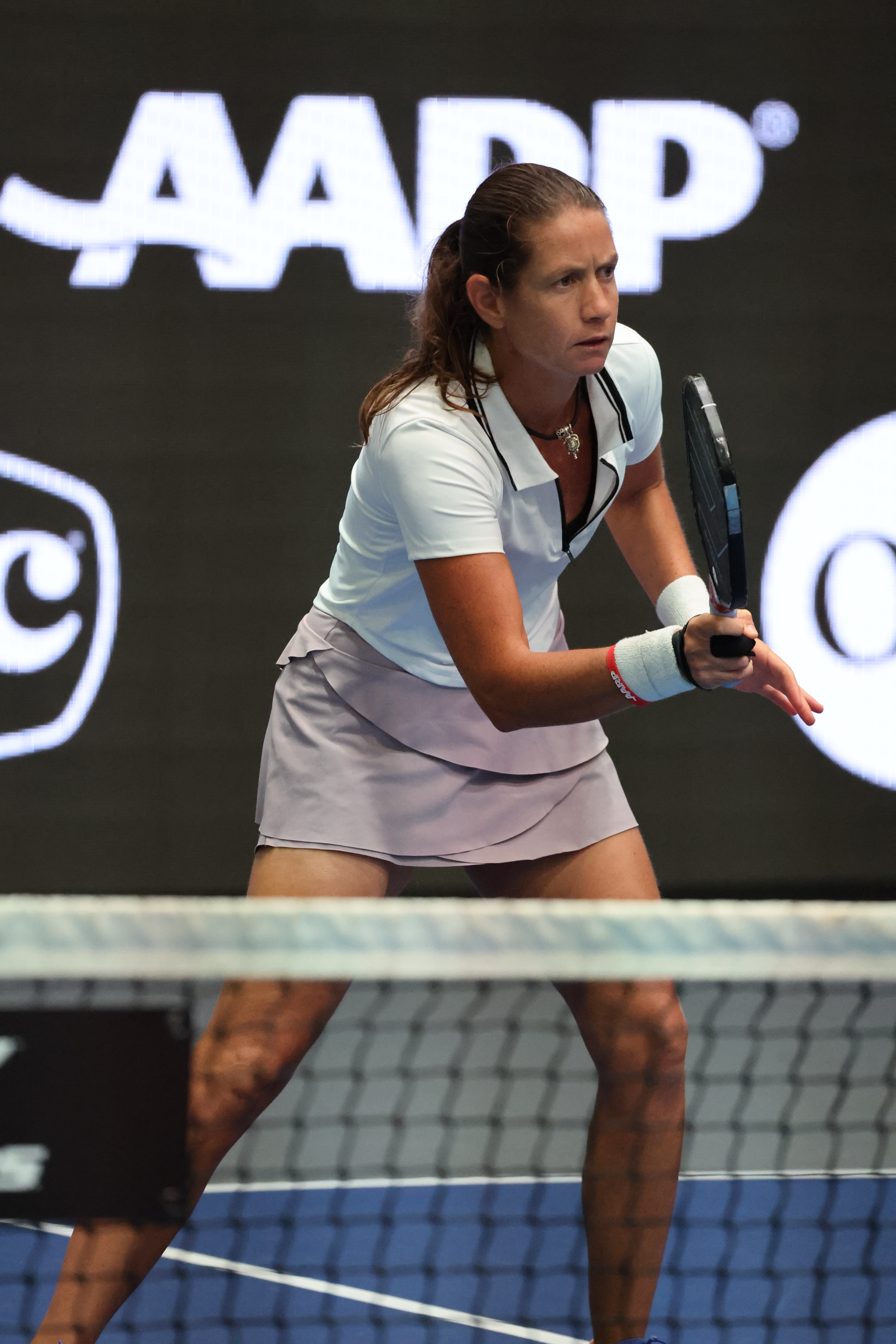

Salome Devidze (Georgian: სალომე დევიძე, romanized: salome devidze, pronounced [sɑlome devidze]; born 2 January 1986) is a Georgian tennis player and a professional pickleball player.

As a professional tennis player, her career-high singles ranking is world No. 254, achieved on 26 April 2004, and in doubles 250, achieved on 10 October 2005. She has won one ITF doubles titles.

Playing for Georgia at the Fed Cup, Devidze has a win–loss record of 18–11. Youngest Davis Cup/Fed Cup match winner (S+D):: Salome Devidze at 13 years old and 270 days.

Now a professional pickleball player.

Early Life and Tennis

Born in Georgia (the country), Salome Devidze’s athletic journey began on the tennis court. With two older brothers immersed in the sport, Salome was destined to follow suit. “I started when I was five. Her talent was undeniable. By the age of eight, Salome caught the attention of a New York sponsor during a tournament in Portugal. This pivotal moment changed her life, leading her family to relocate to Florida so she could train at the prestigious Chris Evert Tennis Academy. For eight years, Salome honed her skills, turning professional at just 16. She achieved a world ranking of 250 in singles and doubles. “The experience was unparalleled, but eventually, my body said, ‘Enough,’” she reflects. Salome has competed in the US Open, French Open and Wimbledon. Salome was ranked number 11 junior in the world at the age of 15. She was number 1 ranked player in Europe 14 and under at the age of 12.

Pickleball

Salome’s rapid ascent is extraordinary. Armed with the precision, power, and strategic acumen developed during her tennis career, she quickly became a force on the pickleball court. Little did she know, a chance game of pickleball during a visit to her brother would change everything. Though skeptical at first, Salome’s competitive spirit was reignited. Within six weeks of picking up a paddle, she won her first professional gold medal. Now, she’s blazing new trails in pickleball, proving that reinvention is possible at any stage of life. Salome has 36 pro medals earned on the PPA & APP tour. Ranked #1 APP and #5 PPA.

== ITF Circuit finals ==
=== Singles: 2 (2 runner-ups) ===
| Legend $100,000 tournaments $75,000 tournaments $50,000 tournaments $25,000 tournaments $10,000 tournaments | Finals by surface Hard (0–1) Clay (0–1) Grass (0–0) Carpet (0–0) |

| Result | W–L | Date | Tournament | Tier | Surface | Opponent | Score |
|---|---|---|---|---|---|---|---|
| Loss | 0–1 | July 2003 | ITF Lexington, United States | 50,000 | Hard | (Japan) Miho Saeki | 4–6, 6–2, 5–7 |
| Loss | 0–2 | Sep 2004 | ITF Tunica Resorts, United States | 25,000 | Clay | (United States) Kelly McCain | 3–6, 3–6 |

=== Doubles: 3 (1 title, 2 runner-ups) ===
| Legend $100,000 tournaments $75,000 tournaments $50,000 tournaments $25,000 tournaments $10,000 tournaments | Finals by surface Hard (0–1) Clay (1–1) Grass (0–0) Carpet (0–0) |

| Result | W–L | Date | Tournament | Tier | Surface | Partner | Opponent | Score |
|---|---|---|---|---|---|---|---|---|
| Winner | 1–0 | Sep 2001 | ITF Greenville, United States | 10,000 | Clay | (Hungary) Melinda Czink | (France) Gaelle Adda (United States) Lindsay Lee-Waters | 6–1, 6–4 |
| Loss | 1–1 | Oct 2005 | ITF Troy, United States | 50,000 | Hard | (Luxembourg) Mandy Minella | (United States) Julie Ditty (Venezuela) Milagros Sequera | 2–6, 2–6 |
| Loss | 1–2 | Oct 2010 | ITF Williamsburg, United States | 10,000 | Clay | (Georgia (country)) Magda Okruashvili | (Russia) Angelina Gabueva (Bulgaria) Svetlana Krivencheva | 4–6, 6–3, [8–10] |
