= ITF Indian Harbour Beach =

ITF Women's Circuit tennis tournament

Revolution Technologies Pro Tennis Classic
- 2018 Space Coast Pro Tennis Classic

ITF Women's Tour
- Event name: Space Coast Pro Tennis Classic (current); Revolution Technologies Pro Tennis Classic; Audi Melbourne Pro Tennis Classic; Mima Foundation / USTA Pro Tennis Classic
- Location: Indian Harbour Beach, United States
- Venue: Kiwi Tennis Club
- Category: ITF Women's Circuit
- Surface: Clay
- Draw: 32S/32Q/16D
- Prize money: $60,000
- Website: http://www.kiwitennisclub.com/

The ITF Indian Harbour Beach is a tournament for professional female tennis players played on outdoor clay courts. The event is classified as a $60,000 ITF Women's Circuit tournament and has been held in Indian Harbour Beach, Florida, United States, since 2006. The tournament wasn't held between 2019 and 2024.

== Past finals ==
=== Singles ===
Year	Champion	Runner-up	Score
2026	Kristina Liutova	(Argentina) Julia Riera	6–1, 6–7^{(4–7)}, 6–3
2025	(Bulgaria) Lia Karatancheva	(Australia) Arina Rodionova	6–2, 6–7^{(6–8)}, 6–3
2019–2024	Not held		
2018	(United States) Caroline Dolehide	(Romania) Irina Bara	6–4, 7–5
2017	(Belarus) Olga Govortsova	(United States) Amanda Anisimova	6–3, 4–6, 6–3
2016	(United States) Jennifer Brady	(United States) Taylor Townsend	6–3, 7–5
2015	(United States) Katerina Stewart	(United States) Louisa Chirico	6–4, 3–6, 6–3
2014	(United States) Taylor Townsend	(Kazakhstan) Yulia Putintseva	6–1, 6–1
2013	(Slovenia) Petra Rampre	(Bulgaria) Dia Evtimova	6–0, 6–1
2012	(United States) Grace Min	(United States) Maria Sanchez	6–4, 7–6^{(7–4)}
2011	(Hungary) Melinda Czink	(United States) Alison Riske	4–6, 6–1, 6–4
2010	(Romania) Edina Gallovits	(United States) Shelby Rogers	2–6, 6–3, 6–4
2009	(United States) Melanie Oudin	(Germany) Laura Siegemund	7–5, 5–7, 6–2
2008	(Belgium) Yanina Wickmayer	(United States) Bethanie Mattek	6–4, 7–6^{(7–5)}
2007	(United States) Bethanie Mattek	(Belarus) Olga Govortsova	7–5, 1–6, 6–1
2006	(Romania) Edina Gallovits	(Paraguay) Rossana de los Ríos	3–6, 7–6^{(7–5)}, 7–6^{(7–0)}

=== Doubles ===
Year	Champions	Runners-up	Score
2026	(United States) Anna Rogers (United States) Allura Zamarripa	(Estonia) Ingrid Neel (United States) Abigail Rencheli	6–3, 6–0
2025	(United States) Haley Giavara (Australia) Alexandra Osborne	(United Kingdom) Tara Moore (United States) Abigail Rencheli	6–3, 3–6, [10–7]
2019–2024	Not held		
2018	(Romania) Irina Bara (Spain) Sílvia Soler Espinosa	(United States) Jessica Pegula (United States) Maria Sanchez	6–4, 6–2
2017	(United States) Kristie Ahn (United States) Quinn Gleason	(Brazil) Laura Pigossi (Mexico) Renata Zarazúa	6–3, 6–2
2016	(Israel) Julia Glushko (Russia) Alexandra Panova	(United States) Maria Sanchez (United States) Jessica Pegula	7–5, 6–4
2015	(United States) Maria Sanchez (United States) Taylor Townsend	(Russia) Angelina Gabueva (United States) Alexandra Stevenson	6–0, 6–1
2014	(United States) Asia Muhammad (United States) Taylor Townsend	(United States) Jan Abaza (United States) Sanaz Marand	6–2, 6–1
2013	(United States) Jan Abaza (United States) Louisa Chirico	(United States) Asia Muhammad (United States) Allie Will	6–4, 6–4
2012	(Brazil) Maria Fernanda Alves (Australia) Jessica Moore	(Canada) Marie-Ève Pelletier (Ukraine) Alyona Sotnikova	6–7^{(6–8)}, 6–3, [10–8]
2011	(Ukraine) Alyona Sotnikova (Slovakia) Lenka Wienerová	(United States) Christina Fusano (United States) Alexa Glatch	6–4, 6–3
2010	(United States) Christina Fusano (United States) Courtney Nagle	(United States) Julie Ditty (United States) Carly Gullickson	6–3, 7–6^{(7–4)}
2009	(Canada) Heidi El Tabakh (Austria) Melanie Klaffner	(Ukraine) Tetiana Luzhanska (United States) Lilia Osterloh	6–3, 3–6, [10–7]
2008	(United States) Madison Brengle (United States) Kristy Frilling	(United States) Raquel Kops-Jones (United States) Abigail Spears	2–6, 6–4, [10–7]
2007	(Australia) Monique Adamczak (United States) Angela Haynes	(United States) Carly Gullickson (United States) Lindsay Lee-Waters	6–1, 3–6, 6–4
2006	(Romania) Edina Gallovits (United States) Jessica Kirkland	(Brazil) Maria Fernanda Alves (Canada) Marie-Ève Pelletier	6–3, 6–2
