= Katerina Stewart =

American tennis player (born 1997)

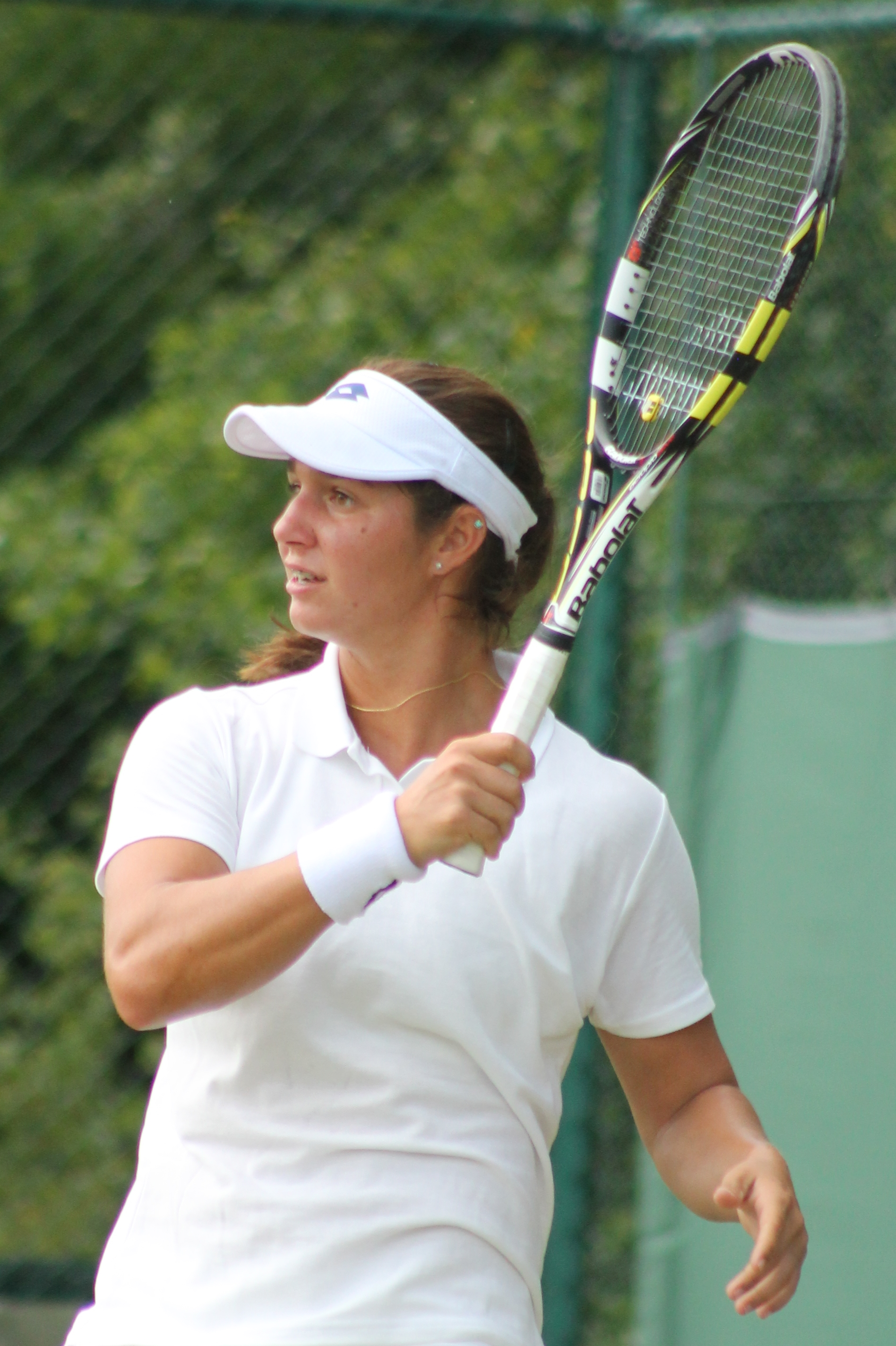
- Stewart at the 2015 Wimbledon Championships
- Country (sports): United States
- Born: July 17, 1997 (age 29) Miami, Florida
- Plays: Right (two-handed backhand)
- Prize money: $180,869

Singles
- Career record: 210–123
- Career titles: 13 ITF
- Highest ranking: No. 158 (July 27, 2015)

Grand Slam singles results
- Australian Open: Q1 (2016)
- French Open: Q1 (2015)
- Wimbledon: Q1 (2015)
- US Open: Q2 (2014)

Doubles
- Career record: 67–66
- Career titles: 5 ITF
- Highest ranking: No. 400 (July 30, 2018)

Katerina Stewart (born July 17, 1997) is an American tennis and pickleball player.

Stewart has won 13 singles and five doubles titles on the ITF Women's Circuit. She reached her best singles ranking of world No. 158 in July 2015, and peaked at No. 400 in the doubles rankings on 30 July 2018.

Stewart made her WTA Tour debut at the 2014 US Open, with a wildcard entry into the doubles draw alongside Louisa Chirico.

She enrolled at the West Point Preparatory School, starting the program in July 2016.

== Personal life ==
She is of Argentine-Italian descent through her mother, Marina. Her Romanian-born father, Caesar, is the director of the Next Level Tennis Academy in Coral Gables, Florida.

== ITF Circuit finals ==
=== Singles: 18 (13 titles, 5 runner-ups) ===
| Legend $100,000 tournaments $80,000 tournaments $50,000 tournaments $25,000 tournaments $10/15,000 tournaments | Finals by surface Hard (2–0) Clay (11–5) |

| Result | W–L | Date | Tournament | Tier | Surface | Opponent | Score |
|---|---|---|---|---|---|---|---|
| Loss | 0–1 | Mar 2014 | ITF Gainesville, United States | 10,000 | Clay | (Czech Republic) Kateřina Kramperová | 3–6, 2–6 |
| Win | 1–1 | Mar 2014 | ITF Orlando, US | 10,000 | Clay | (Ukraine) Elizaveta Ianchuk | 6–1, 6–1 |
| Win | 2–1 | Jun 2014 | ITF Bethany Beach, US | 10,000 | Clay | (United States) Josie Kuhlman | 6–0, 6–3 |
| Win | 3–1 | Jun 2014 | ITF Charlotte, US | 10,000 | Clay | (United States) Josie Kuhlman | 6–1, 7–6^{2} |
| Win | 4–1 | Mar 2015 | ITF Gainesville, US | 10,000 | Clay | (United States) Sofia Kenin | 6–4, 4–6, 6–4 |
| Win | 5–1 | Mar 2015 | Innisbrook Open, US | 25,000 | Clay | (Ukraine) Maryna Zanevska | 1–6, 6–3, 2–0 ret. |
| Loss | 5–2 | Apr 2015 | Dothan Pro Classic, US | 50,000 | Clay | (United States) Louisa Chirico | 6–7^{1}, 6–3, 6–7^{1} |
| Loss | 5–3 | May 2015 | Charlottesville Open, US | 50,000 | Clay | (United States) Allie Kiick | 7–5, 6–7^{3}, 7–5 |
| Win | 6–3 | May 2015 | ITF Indian Harbour Beach, US | 50,000 | Clay | (United States) Louisa Chirico | 6–4, 3–6, 6–3 |
| Win | 7–3 | Mar 2016 | ITF Weston, US | 10,000 | Clay | (South Africa) Chanel Simmonds | 3–6, 6–2, 6–1 |
| Win | 8–3 | Mar 2016 | ITF Orlando, US | 10,000 | Clay | (United States) Grace Min | 6–4, 6–3 |
| Win | 9–3 | Aug 2017 | ITF Fort Worth, US | 25,000 | Hard | (Colombia) Emiliana Arango | 6–4, 6–1 |
| Win | 10–3 | Mar 2018 | ITF Tampa, US | 15,000 | Clay | (United States) Jessica Pegula | 6–2, 6–3 |
| Win | 11–3 | May 2019 | ITF Naples, US. | 15,000 | Clay | (Australia) Belinda Woolcock | 6–4, 6–3 |
| Loss | 11–4 | Aug 2019 | ITF Guayaquil, Ecuador | 25,000 | Clay | (Colombia) Camila Osorio | 5–7, 6–7^{3} |
| Loss | 11–5 | Aug 2019 | ITF Guayaquil, Ecuador | 25,000 | Clay | (Colombia) Camila Osorio | 5–7, 3–6 |
| Win | 12–5 | Oct 2019 | Tennis Classic of Macon, US | 80,000 | Hard | (United States) Shelby Rogers | 6–7^{2}, 6–3, 6–2 |
| Win | 13–5 | Oct 2021 | ITF Hilton Head, US | 15,000 | Clay | (United States) Raveena Kingsley | 6–4, 6–2 |

=== Doubles: 10 (5 titles, 5 runner-ups) ===
| Legend $50,000 tournaments $25,000 tournaments $10/15,000 tournaments | Finals by surface Clay (5–5) |

| Result | W–L | Date | Tournament | Tier | Surface | Partner | Opponents | Score |
|---|---|---|---|---|---|---|---|---|
| Win | 1–0 | Dec 2012 | ITF Antalya, Turkey | 10,000 | Clay | (Belgium) Justine De Sutter | (Romania) Irina Bara (Romania) Ioana Loredana Roșca | 7–5, 6–4 |
| Loss | 1–1 | Dec 2012 | ITF Antalya, Turkey | 10,000 | Clay | (Belgium) Justine De Sutter | (Italy) Anastasia Grymalska (Bulgaria) Julia Stamatova | 2–6, 6–3, [8–10] |
| Loss | 1–2 | Jun 2014 | ITF Bethany Beach, US | 10,000 | Clay | (United States) Rima Asatrian | (United States) Lena Litvak (United States) Alexandra Mueller | 4–6, 1–6 |
| Win | 2–2 | Feb 2015 | ITF Sunrise, US | 25,000 | Clay | (Russia) Anna Kalinskaya | (Brazil) Paula Cristina Gonçalves (Brazil) Beatriz Haddad Maia | 7–6^{(6)}, 5–7, [10–6] |
| Loss | 2–3 | Mar 2015 | ITF Orlando, US | 10,000 | Clay | (Czech Republic) Kateřina Kramperová | (United States) Ingrid Neel (Hungary) Fanny Stollár | 3–6, 6–7^{(4)} |
| Win | 3–3 | Mar 2016 | ITF Weston, US | 10,000 | Clay | (Switzerland) Tess Sugnaux | (Argentina) Julieta Lara Estable (Italy) Jasmine Paolini | 7–6^{(2)}, 6–3 |
| Loss | 3–4 | Mar 2016 | ITF Osprey, US | 50,000 | Clay | (United States) Louisa Chirico | (United States) Asia Muhammad (United States) Taylor Townsend | 1–6, 7–6^{(5)}, [4–10] |
| Loss | 3–5 | Mar 2018 | ITF Tampa, US | 15,000 | Clay | (United States) Rasheeda McAdoo | (United States) Caty McNally (United States) Natasha Subhash | 6–3, 3–6, [6–10] |
| Win | 4–5 | Aug 2019 | ITF Guayaquil, Ecuador | 25,000 | Clay | (Romania) Gabriela Lee | (Colombia) Yuliana Lizarazo (Colombia) Camila Osorio | 6–7^{(1)}, 7–6^{(6)}, [10–7] |
| Win | 5–5 | Oct 2021 | ITF Hilton Head, US | 15,000 | Clay | (Russia) Anastasia Sysoeva | (Austria) Emily Meyer (Spain) Maria Aran Teixido | w/o |

== Junior Grand Slam finals ==
=== Doubles (0–1) ===
| Result | Year | Tournament | Surface | Partner | Opponents | Score |
|---|---|---|---|---|---|---|
| Loss | 2015 | French Open | Clay | (United States) Caroline Dolehide | (Czech Republic) Miriam Kolodziejová (Czech Republic) Markéta Vondroušová | 6–0, 6–3 |
