= 2015 CopperWynd Pro Women's Challenge =

- Date: 9–15 November
- Edition: 1st
- Category: ITF Women's Circuit
- Prize money: $50,000
- Surface: Hard
- Location: Scottsdale, United States

Champions

Singles
- (United States) Samantha Crawford

Doubles
- (Israel) Julia Glushko / (Sweden) Rebecca Peterson
CopperWynd Pro Women's Challenge	· 2016 →

The 2015 CopperWynd Pro Women's Challenge was a professional tennis tournament played on outdoor hard courts. It was the first edition of the tournament and part of the 2015 ITF Women's Circuit, offering a total of $50,000 in prize money. It took place in Scottsdale, United States, on 9–15 November 2015.

== Singles main draw entrants ==
=== Seeds ===
Country	Player	Rank^{1}	Seed
GER	Tatjana Maria	68	1
USA	Anna Tatishvili	100	2
GBR	Naomi Broady	121	3
USA	Nicole Gibbs	128	4
SWE	Rebecca Peterson	129	5
ISR	Julia Glushko	139	6
RUS	Alla Kudryavtseva	161	7
PAR	Verónica Cepede Royg	166	8

- ^{1} Rankings as of 2 November 2015

=== Other entrants ===
The following players received wildcards into the singles main draw:

- (United States) Robin Anderson
- (United States) Vania King
- (United States) Danielle Lao
- (United States) Kylie McKenzie

The following players received entry from the qualifying draw:

- (Canada) Françoise Abanda
- (United States) Jacqueline Cako
- (Canada) Sharon Fichman
- (United States) Sabrina Santamaria

The following player received entry by a lucky loser spot:

- (United States) Sophie Chang

== Champions ==
=== Singles ===
- (United States) Samantha Crawford def. (Switzerland) Viktorija Golubic, 6–3, 4–6, 6–2

=== Doubles ===
- (Israel) Julia Glushko / (Sweden) Rebecca Peterson def. (Switzerland) Viktorija Golubic / (Liechtenstein) Stephanie Vogt, 4–6, 7–5, [10–6]
