= 2016 CopperWynd Pro Women's Challenge =

- Date: 31 October–6 November
- Edition: 2nd
- Category: ITF Women's Circuit
- Prize money: $50,000
- Surface: Hard
- Location: Scottsdale, Arizona, United States

Champions

Singles
- (Brazil) Beatriz Haddad Maia

Doubles
- (United States) Ingrid Neel / (United States) Taylor Townsend
← 2015 ·	CopperWynd Pro Women's Challenge	· 2017 →

The 2016 CopperWynd Pro Women's Challenge was a professional tennis tournament played on outdoor hard courts. It was the 2nd edition of the tournament and part of the 2016 ITF Women's Circuit, offering a total of $50,000 in prize money. It took place in Scottsdale, Arizona, United States, on 31 October–6 November 2016.

== Singles main draw entrants ==
=== Seeds ===
Country	Player	Rank^{1}	Seed
USA	Nicole Gibbs	75	1
USA	Samantha Crawford	104	2
PAR	Verónica Cepede Royg	111	3
USA	Jennifer Brady	115	4
SWE	Rebecca Peterson	125	5
USA	Grace Min	130	6
USA	Taylor Townsend	133	7
AUT	Barbara Haas	144	8

- ^{1} Rankings as of 24 October 2016.

=== Other entrants ===
The following player received a wildcard into the singles main draw:

- (Australia) Laura Ashley
- (United States) Ellie Halbauer
- (United States) Chiara Scholl

The following players received entry from the qualifying draw:

- (United States) Claire Liu
- (United States) Sanaz Marand
- (United States) Kylie McKenzie
- (Ukraine) Alyona Sotnikova

The following player received entry by a lucky loser spot:

- (United States) Brynn Boren

The following player received entry by a special exempt:

- (United States) Danielle Collins

== Champions ==
=== Singles ===
- (Brazil) Beatriz Haddad Maia def. (United States) Kristie Ahn, 7–6^{(7–4)}, 7–6^{(7–2)}

=== Doubles ===
- (United States) Ingrid Neel / (United States) Taylor Townsend def. (United States) Samantha Crawford / (United States) Melanie Oudin, 6–4, 6–3
