= 2015 CopperWynd Pro Women's Challenge – Singles =

Singles
- 2015 CopperWynd Pro Women's Challenge

Final
- Champion: (United States) Samantha Crawford
- Runner-up: (Switzerland) Viktorija Golubic
- Score: 6–3, 4–6, 6–2

Events
Singles	Doubles
← 2014 ·	CopperWynd Pro Women's Challenge	· 2016 →

This was a new event in the ITF Women's Circuit.

Samantha Crawford won the inaugural edition, defeating Viktorija Golubic in the final, 6–3, 4–6, 6–2.

== Seeds ==
1. (Germany) Tatjana Maria (first round)
2. (United States) Anna Tatishvili (first round)
3. (United Kingdom) Naomi Broady (second round)
4. (United States) Nicole Gibbs (second round)
5. (Sweden) Rebecca Peterson (semifinals)
6. (Israel) Julia Glushko (quarterfinals)
7. (Russia) Alla Kudryavtseva (withdrew)
8. (Paraguay) Verónica Cepede Royg (quarterfinals)

== Main draw ==
=== Key ===
- Q = Qualifier
- WC = Wild card
- LL = Lucky loser
- Alt = Alternate
- SE = Special exempt
- PR = Protected ranking
- ITF = ITF entry
- JE = Junior exempt
- w/o = Walkover
- r = Retired
- d = Defaulted
- SR = Special ranking

=== Finals ===
Semifinals
(Switzerland) Viktorija Golubic	6	6
WC	(United States) Robin Anderson	3	3
5	(Sweden) Rebecca Peterson	6	6^{5}	6^{2}
(United States) Samantha Crawford	4	7^{7}	7^{7}

Final
(Switzerland) Viktorija Golubic	3	6	2
(United States) Samantha Crawford	6	4	6

=== Top half ===
First round
1	(Germany) T Maria	4	6^{6}
Q	(United States) J Cako	6	7^{8}
(Switzerland) V Golubic	7	1
(United States) J Boserup	5	0^{r}
(Mexico) V Rodríguez	6	1	6
(United States) K Stewart	2	6	3
(Argentina) M Irigoyen	3	4
LL	(United States) S Chang	6	6
4	(United States) N Gibbs	6	6
(Canada) G Dabrowski	1	1
WC	(United States) D Lao	5	1
WC	(United States) R Anderson	7	6
(Mexico) M Zacarías	6	7
(United States) M Sanchez	3	5
(Israel) S Pe'er	4	6	1
8	(Paraguay) V Cepede Royg	6	2	6

Second round
Q	(United States) J Cako	2	6	4
(Switzerland) V Golubic	6	1	6
(Mexico) V Rodríguez	6	6
LL	(United States) S Chang	2	0
4	(United States) N Gibbs	5	7	3
WC	(United States) R Anderson	7	5	6
(Mexico) M Zacarías	2	3
8	(Paraguay) V Cepede Royg	6	6

Quarterfinals
(Switzerland) V Golubic	7	6
(Mexico) V Rodríguez	5	1
WC	(United States) R Anderson	6	4	6
8	(Paraguay) V Cepede Royg	3	6	3

Semifinals
(Switzerland) V Golubic	6	6
WC	(United States) R Anderson	3	3

=== Bottom half ===
First round
5	(Sweden) R Peterson	7^{7}	6
Q	(United States) S Santamaria	6^{4}	1
(United States) G Min	7	3	6
(United States) J Brady	5	6	4
Q	(Canada) S Fichman	4	2
WC	(United States) V King	6	6
Q	(Canada) F Abanda	7	1	1
3	(United Kingdom) N Broady	5	6	6
6	(Israel) J Glushko	6	6
WC	(United States) K McKenzie	4	1
(Serbia) J Jakšić	7	7^{7}
(Liechtenstein) S Vogt	5	6^{2}
(United States) S Crawford	4	7^{8}	6
(United States) K Ahn	6	6^{6}	3
(Bulgaria) E Kostova	6	5	7^{8}
2	(United States) A Tatishvili	2	7	6^{6}

Second round
5	(Sweden) R Peterson	6	0	7^{7}
(United States) G Min	3	6	6^{5}
WC	(United States) V King	3	6	7
3	(United Kingdom) N Broady	6	3	5
6	(Israel) J Glushko	6	6
(Serbia) J Jakšić	1	3
(United States) S Crawford	6	4	6
(Bulgaria) E Kostova	4	6	3

Quarterfinals
5	(Sweden) R Peterson	4	6	6
WC	(United States) V King	6	4	2
6	(Israel) J Glushko	5	3
(United States) S Crawford	7	6

Semifinals
5	(Sweden) R Peterson	6	6^{5}	6^{2}
(United States) S Crawford	4	7^{7}	7^{7}
