= 2016 CopperWynd Pro Women's Challenge – Doubles =

Tennis tournament

Doubles
- 2016 CopperWynd Pro Women's Challenge

Final
- Champions: (United States) Ingrid Neel (United States) Taylor Townsend
- Runners-up: (United States) Samantha Crawford (United States) Melanie Oudin
- Score: 6–4, 6–3

Events
Singles	Doubles
← 2015 ·	CopperWynd Pro Women's Challenge	· 2017 →

Julia Glushko and Rebecca Peterson were the defending champions, but Glushko chose not to participate. Peterson partnered Sanaz Marand, but they lost in the first round.

Ingrid Neel and Taylor Townsend won the title, defeating Samantha Crawford and Melanie Oudin in the final, 6–4, 6–3.

== Seeds ==
1. (Paraguay) Verónica Cepede Royg / (United States) Nicole Melichar (first round)
2. (United States) Ingrid Neel / (United States) Taylor Townsend (champions)
3. (United States) Sanaz Marand / (Sweden) Rebecca Peterson (first round)
4. (Bosnia and Herzegovina) Ema Burgić Bucko / (Bosnia and Herzegovina) Jasmina Tinjić (quarterfinals)

== Draw ==
=== Key ===
- Q = Qualifier
- WC = Wild card
- LL = Lucky loser
- Alt = Alternate
- SE = Special exempt
- PR = Protected ranking
- ITF = ITF entry
- JE = Junior exempt
- w/o = Walkover
- r = Retired
- d = Defaulted
- SR = Special ranking

First round
1	(Paraguay) V Cepede Royg (United States) N Melichar	5	6	[10]
(United States) S Crawford (United States) M Oudin	7	4	[12]
(Russia) V Flink (Ukraine) E Ianchuk	6	2	[5]
(United States) K Ahn (United States) C Van Nguyen	1	6	[10]
4	(Bosnia and Herzegovina) E Burgić Bucko (Bosnia and Herzegovina) J Tinjić	6	6
(United States) S Chang (United States) C Scholl	2	4
WC	(United States) Me McCray (United States) Mo McCray	2	1^{r}
WC	(United States) D Krawczyk (United States) K McKenzie	6	4
WC	(Australia) L Ashley (Ukraine) A Sotnikova	5	4
(France) M Georges (United States) M Schmidt	7	6
(Turkey) B Eraydın (Russia) A Pivovarova	6	6
3	(United States) S Marand (Sweden) R Peterson	4	4
(United States) J Abaza (United States) S Santamaria	2	2
(Ukraine) Y Beygelzimer (France) A Lim	6	6
(United States) B Boren (Mexico) G Olmos	2	1
2	(United States) I Neel (United States) T Townsend	6	6

Quarterfinals
(United States) S Crawford (United States) M Oudin	7^{7}	6
(United States) K Ahn (United States) C Van Nguyen	6^{4}	2
4	(Bosnia and Herzegovina) E Burgić Bucko (Bosnia and Herzegovina) J Tinjić	6^{6}	1
WC	(United States) D Krawczyk (United States) K McKenzie	7^{8}	6
(France) M Georges (United States) M Schmidt	4	2
(Turkey) B Eraydın (Russia) A Pivovarova	6	6
(Ukraine) Y Beygelzimer (France) A Lim	0	0
2	(United States) I Neel (United States) T Townsend	6	6

Semifinals
(United States) S Crawford (United States) M Oudin	6	4	[10]
WC	(United States) D Krawczyk (United States) K McKenzie	4	6	[8]
(Turkey) B Eraydın (Russia) A Pivovarova	2	6^{5}
2	(United States) I Neel (United States) T Townsend	6	7^{7}

Final
(United States) S Crawford (United States) M Oudin	4	3
2	(United States) I Neel (United States) T Townsend	6	6
