= 2016 CopperWynd Pro Women's Challenge – Singles =

Singles
- 2016 CopperWynd Pro Women's Challenge

Final
- Champion: (Brazil) Beatriz Haddad Maia
- Runner-up: (United States) Kristie Ahn
- Score: 7–6^{(7–4)}, 7–6^{(7–2)}

Events
Singles	Doubles
← 2015 ·	CopperWynd Pro Women's Challenge	· 2017 →

Samantha Crawford was the defending champion, but lost to Sofia Kenin in the first round.

Beatriz Haddad Maia won the title, defeating Kristie Ahn in the final, 7–6^{(7–4)}, 7–6^{(7–2)}.

== Seeds ==
1. (United States) Nicole Gibbs (second round)
2. (United States) Samantha Crawford (first round)
3. (Paraguay) Verónica Cepede Royg (first round)
4. (United States) Jennifer Brady (semifinals)
5. (Sweden) Rebecca Peterson (second round)
6. (United States) Grace Min (quarterfinals)
7. (United States) Taylor Townsend (second round)
8. (Austria) Barbara Haas (quarterfinals)

== Main draw ==
=== Key ===
- Q = Qualifier
- WC = Wild card
- LL = Lucky loser
- Alt = Alternate
- ITF = ITF entry
- PR = Protected ranking
- SR = Special ranking
- SE = Special exempt
- JE = Junior exempt
- JR = Junior Accelerator Programme entrant
- CO = College Accelerator Programme entrant
- NG = Next Gen Accelerator Program entrant
- w/o = Walkover
- r = Retired
- d = Defaulted

=== Finals ===
Semifinals
(Brazil) Beatriz Haddad Maia	6	6
(United States) Kayla Day	4	1
4	(United States) Jennifer Brady	6	4	4
(United States) Kristie Ahn	2	6	6

Final
(Brazil) Beatriz Haddad Maia	7^{7}	7^{7}
(United States) Kristie Ahn	6^{4}	6^{2}

=== Top half ===
First round
1	(United States) N Gibbs	6	6
(Russia) A Pivovarova	3	2
(Argentina) C Pella	2	1
(Brazil) B Haddad Maia	6	6
WC	(United States) E Halbauer	6	6
WC	(Australia) L Ashley	1	2
(Ukraine) E Ianchuk	5	5
8	(Austria) B Haas	7	7
3	(Paraguay) V Cepede Royg	7	1	0
(United States) M Oudin	5	6	6
(United States) K Day	6	6
(United States) R Anderson	3	4
(Bulgaria) S Karatantcheva	6	6
Q	(Ukraine) A Sotnikova	1	5^{r}
(France) M Georges	1	1
5	(Sweden) R Peterson	6	6

Second round
1	(United States) N Gibbs	4	1
(Brazil) B Haddad Maia	6	6
WC	(United States) E Halbauer	1	3
8	(Austria) B Haas	6	6
(United States) M Oudin	5	5
(United States) K Day	7	7
(Bulgaria) S Karatantcheva	6	6
5	(Sweden) R Peterson	3	1

Quarterfinals
(Brazil) B Haddad Maia	7^{7}	6
8	(Austria) B Haas	6^{5}	1
(United States) K Day	7^{7}	6
(Bulgaria) S Karatantcheva	6^{3}	4

Semifinals
(Brazil) B Haddad Maia	6	6
(United States) K Day	4	1

=== Bottom half ===
First round
6	(United States) G Min	7	6
(United States) D Lao	5	3
(France) A Lim	6^{5}	4
(Turkey) B Eraydın	7^{7}	6
Q	(United States) K McKenzie	6	6
Q	(United States) C Liu	1	4
LL	(United States) B Boren	3	0
4	(United States) J Brady	6	6
7	(United States) T Townsend	6	3	6
SE	(United States) D Collins	4	6	3
WC	(United States) C Scholl	0	4
(Russia) V Flink	6	6
Q	(United States) S Marand	2	6^{2}
(United States) K Ahn	6	7^{7}
(United States) S Kenin	7	6^{5}	6
2	(United States) S Crawford	5	7^{7}	4

Second round
6	(United States) G Min	4	6	6
(Turkey) B Eraydın	6	4	4
Q	(United States) K McKenzie	2	3
4	(United States) J Brady	6	6
7	(United States) T Townsend	4	4
(Russia) V Flink	6	6
(United States) K Ahn	6	6
(United States) S Kenin	2	4

Quarterfinals
6	(United States) G Min	0	6^{5}
4	(United States) J Brady	6	7^{7}
(Russia) V Flink	3	6	4
(United States) K Ahn	6	2	6

Semifinals
4	(United States) J Brady	6	4	4
(United States) K Ahn	2	6	6
