= 2015 CopperWynd Pro Women's Challenge – Doubles =

Doubles
- 2015 CopperWynd Pro Women's Challenge

Final
- Champions: (Israel) Julia Glushko (Sweden) Rebecca Peterson
- Runners-up: (Switzerland) Viktorija Golubic (Liechtenstein) Stephanie Vogt
- Score: 4–6, 7–5, [10–6]

Events
Singles	Doubles
← 2014 ·	CopperWynd Pro Women's Challenge	· 2016 →

This was a new event in the ITF Women's Circuit.

Julia Glushko and Rebecca Peterson won the inaugural title, defeating Viktorija Golubic and Stephanie Vogt in the final, 4–6, 7–5, [10–6].

== Seeds ==
1. (Switzerland) Viktorija Golubic / (Liechtenstein) Stephanie Vogt (final)
2. (Canada) Sharon Fichman / (United States) Maria Sanchez (quarterfinals; withdrew)
3. (Brazil) Paula Cristina Gonçalves / (United States) Sanaz Marand (first round)
4. (Brazil) Gabriela Cé / (Argentina) María Irigoyen (quarterfinals; withdrew)

== Draw ==
=== Key ===
- Q = Qualifier
- WC = Wild card
- LL = Lucky loser
- Alt = Alternate
- SE = Special exempt
- PR = Protected ranking
- ITF = ITF entry
- JE = Junior exempt
- w/o = Walkover
- r = Retired
- d = Defaulted
- SR = Special ranking

First round
1	(Switzerland) V Golubic (Liechtenstein) S Vogt	6	7
(United States) A Weinhold (United States) C Whoriskey	2	5
(United States) K Christian (United States) D Lao	3	6	[10]
(United States) J Cako (Mexico) R Zarazúa	6	4	[5]
4	(Brazil) G Cé (Argentina) M Irigoyen	7	3	[10]
WC	(United States) D Krawczyk (United States) S Vlad	5	6	[7]
(United States) R Anderson (United States) V King	7	6
(South Africa) M Sammons (South Africa) C Simmonds	5	4
(United States) J Brady (United States) K Stewart	6^{5}	6	[7]
(United States) S Crawford (United States) J Loeb	7^{7}	3	[10]
(Romania) M Buzărnescu (Bulgaria) E Kostova	7	1	[10]
3	(Brazil) PC Gonçalves (United States) S Marand	5	6	[7]
(Canada) F Abanda (United States) S Chang	4	3
(Israel) J Glushko (Sweden) R Peterson	6	6
(Mexico) V Rodríguez (Mexico) M Zacarías	3	2
2	(Canada) S Fichman (United States) M Sanchez	6	6

Quarterfinals
1	(Switzerland) V Golubic (Liechtenstein) S Vogt	3	6	[10]
(United States) K Christian (United States) D Lao	6	2	[7]
4	(Brazil) G Cé (Argentina) M Irigoyen
(United States) R Anderson (United States) V King	w/o
(United States) S Crawford (United States) J Loeb	6	6
(Romania) M Buzărnescu (Bulgaria) E Kostova	1	4
(Israel) J Glushko (Sweden) R Peterson	w/o
2	(Canada) S Fichman (United States) M Sanchez

Semifinals
1	(Switzerland) V Golubic (Liechtenstein) S Vogt	3	6	[10]
(United States) R Anderson (United States) V King	6	1	[5]
(United States) S Crawford (United States) J Loeb	5	2
(Israel) J Glushko (Sweden) R Peterson	7	6

Final
1	(Switzerland) V Golubic (Liechtenstein) S Vogt	6	5	[6]
(Israel) J Glushko (Sweden) R Peterson	4	7	[10]
