= 2026 Oeiras Indoors 2 =

- Date: 16–22 February
- Edition: 2nd
- Category: WTA 125
- Draw: 32S/16D
- Surface: Hard (Indoor)
- Location: Oeiras, Portugal

Champions

Singles
- (Ukraine) Daria Snigur

Doubles
- (Slovakia) Viktória Hrunčáková / (Czech Republic) Gabriela Knutson
- Oeiras Indoors

The 2026 Oeiras 2 Jamor Indoor was a professional women's tennis tournament played on indoor hardcourts. It was the second edition of the tournament in a series of two WTA 125 tournaments played at the same venue in consecutive weeks in 2026. It took place at the Centro Desportivo Nacional do Jamor in Oeiras, Portugal between 16 and 22 February 2026.

== Singles main-draw entrants ==
=== Seeds ===
Country	Player	Rank^{1}	Seed
SUI	Viktorija Golubic	89	1
AUT	Sinja Kraus	106	2
NED	Suzan Lamens	111	3
CHN	Yuan Yue	121	4
UKR	Daria Snigur	123	5
POL	Linda Klimovičová	129	6
ESP	Kaitlin Quevedo	130	7
BUL	Viktoriya Tomova	153	8

- ^{1} Rankings as of 9 February 2026.

=== Other entrants ===
The following players received wildcards into the singles main draw:

- (United Kingdom) Emily Appleton
- (Portugal) Madalena Matias
- (Portugal) Ana Filipa Santos
- (Portugal) Angelina Voloshchuk

The following players received entry from the qualifying draw:

- (United Kingdom) Naiktha Bains
- (Slovenia) Dalila Jakupović
- (Chinese Taipei) Liang En-shuo
- (France) Yasmine Mansouri

=== Withdrawals ===
- (Czech Republic) Nikola Bartůňková → replaced by (Portugal) Francisca Jorge
- (United Kingdom) Katie Boulter → replaced by (United States) Fiona Crawley
- (Poland) Maja Chwalińska → replaced by (Portugal) Matilde Jorge
- (Serbia) Olga Danilović → replaced by (Czech Republic) Barbora Palicová
- (Czech Republic) Linda Fruhvirtová → replaced by (Slovakia) Viktória Hrunčáková
- (Hungary) Dalma Gálfi → replaced by (Germany) Caroline Werner
- (Andorra) Victoria Jiménez Kasintseva → replaced by (United States) Ayana Akli
- (Ukraine) Anhelina Kalinina → replaced by Anastasia Tikhonova
- (Canada) Marina Stakusic → replaced by (Netherlands) Anouk Koevermans
- (Uzbekistan) Maria Timofeeva → replaced by (Spain) Sara Sorribes Tormo

=== Retirements ===
- (Portugal) Matilde Jorge (left leg injury)
- (Czech Republic) Gabriela Knutson (left hip injury)

== Doubles main-draw entrants ==
=== Seeds ===
Country	Player	Country	Player	Rank^{1}	Seed
GBR	Emily Appleton	JPN	Makoto Ninomiya	160	1
HKG	Eudice Chong	TPE	Liang En-shuo	162	2
CZE	Anastasia Dețiuc		Anastasia Tikhonova	165	3
POR	Francisca Jorge	POR	Matilde Jorge	195	4

- ^{1} Rankings as of 9 February 2026.

=== Other entrants ===
The following team received a wildcard into the doubles main draw:

- (Germany) Gina Dittmann / (Portugal) Ana Filipa Santos

=== Withdrawal ===
During the tournament

- (Portugal) Francisca Jorge / (Portugal) Matilde Jorge (M. Jorge – left leg injury)

== Champions ==
=== Singles ===
- (Ukraine) Daria Snigur def. (Switzerland) Viktorija Golubic 6–3, 6–3

=== Doubles ===
- (Slovakia) Viktória Hrunčáková / (Czech Republic) Gabriela Knutson def. (United States) Carmen Corley / (United States) Ivana Corley 7–6^{(9–7)}, 6–3
