= 2016 Fed Cup Europe/Africa Zone Group I – Pool A =

Pool A of the 2016 Fed Cup Europe/Africa Zone Group I was one of four pools in the Europe/Africa zone of the 2016 Fed Cup. Four teams competed in a round robin competition, with the top team and the bottom team proceeding to their respective sections of the play-offs: the top team played for advancement to the World Group II Play-offs, while the bottom team faced potential relegation to Group II.

== Standings ==
		(Sweden) SWE	(Ukraine) UKR	(Portugal) POR	RR; W–L	Set; W–L	Game; W–L	Standings
21	Sweden		0–3	1–2	0–2	3–10	34–71	3
30	Ukraine	3–0		3–0	2–0	12–1	73–33	1
37	Portugal	2–1	0–3		1–1	4–8	49–62	2

== Round-robin ==
=== Ukraine vs. Portugal ===
Ukraine
3
Municipal Tennis Centre, Eilat, Israel
3 February 2016
Hard (outdoors)

Portugal
0

			1	2	3
1	(Ukraine) (Portugal)	Kateryna Bondarenko; Maria João Koehler	6; 4	6; 2
2	(Ukraine) (Portugal)	Lesia Tsurenko; Michelle Larcher de Brito	6; 2	6; 3
3	(Ukraine) (Portugal)	Kateryna Bondarenko / Olga Savchuk; Michelle Larcher de Brito / Inês Murta	6; 2	6; 2

=== Sweden vs. Portugal ===
Sweden
1
Municipal Tennis Centre, Eilat, Israel
4 February 2016
Hard (outdoors)

Portugal
2

			1	2	3
1	(Sweden) (Portugal)	Susanne Celik; Maria João Koehler	3; 6	4; 6
2	(Sweden) (Portugal)	Rebecca Peterson; Michelle Larcher de Brito	7^{7} 6^{5}	6; 4
3	(Sweden) (Portugal)	Cornelia Lister / Rebecca Peterson; Maria João Koehler / Michelle Larcher de Brito	3; 6	3; 6

=== Sweden vs. Ukraine ===
Sweden
0
Municipal Tennis Centre, Eilat, Israel
5 February 2016
Hard (outdoors)

Ukraine
3

			1	2	3
1	(Sweden) (Ukraine)	Susanne Celik; Kateryna Bondarenko	1; 6	3; 6
2	(Sweden) (Ukraine)	Rebecca Peterson; Lesia Tsurenko	6; 1	2; 6	0; 6
3	(Sweden) (Ukraine)	Jacqueline Cabaj Awad / Cornelia Lister; Olga Savchuk / Anastasiya Vasylyeva	2; 6	4; 6
