= 2026 Oeiras Indoors 2 – Doubles =

Doubles
- 2026 Oeiras Indoors 2

Final
- Champion: (Slovakia) Viktória Hrunčáková (Czech Republic) Gabriela Knutson
- Runner-up: (United States) Carmen Corley (United States) Ivana Corley
- Score: 7–6^{(9–7)}, 6–3

Details
- Draw: 16 (1 WC)
- Seeds: 4

Events
Singles	Doubles
- Oeiras Indoors

Viktória Hrunčáková and Gabriela Knutson won the title, defeating defending champions Carmen and Ivana Corley 7–6^{(9–7)}, 6–3 in the final.

== Seeds ==
1. (United Kingdom) Emily Appleton / (Japan) Makoto Ninomiya (quarterfinals)
2. (Hong Kong) Eudice Chong / (Chinese Taipei) Liang En-shuo (first round)
3. (Czech Republic) Anastasia Dețiuc / Anastasia Tikhonova (first round)
4. (Portugal) Francisca Jorge / (Portugal) Matilde Jorge (semifinals, withdrew)

== Draw ==
Key

- Q = Qualifier
- WC = Wild card
- LL = Lucky loser
- Alt = Alternate
- ITF = ITF entry
- PR = Protected ranking
- SR = Special ranking
- SE = Special exempt
- JE = Junior exempt
- JR = Junior Accelerator Programme entrant
- CO = College Accelerator Programme entrant
- NG = Next Gen Accelerator Program entrant
- w/o = Walkover
- r = Retired
- d = Defaulted

First round
1	(United Kingdom) E Appleton (Japan) M Ninomiya	7^{7}	4	[10]
(Netherlands) A Koevermans (Netherlands) S Lamens	6^{1}	6	[5]
(Slovenia) D Jakupović (Slovenia) N Radišić	1	4
(United States) C Corley (United States) I Corley	6	6
4	(Portugal) F Jorge (Portugal) M Jorge	6	6
WC	(Germany) G Dittmann (Portugal) AF Santos	0	1
(Chinese Taipei) I-h Cho (Chinese Taipei) Y-t Cho	6	3	[10]
(United Kingdom) F Christie (United Kingdom) E Silva	1	6	[8]
(South Africa) Wa Mdlulwa (South Africa) Wo Mdlulwa	2	3
(France) C Monnet (Bulgaria) V Tomova	6	6
(United States) A Akli (United States) F Crawley	6	1	[10]
3	(Czech Republic) A Dețiuc; A Tikhonova	3	6	[6]
(Slovakia) V Hrunčáková (Czech Republic) G Knutson	4	6	[10]
(Czech Republic) M Bayerlová (Ukraine) N Kolb	6	1	[4]
(Romania) I Bara; I Shymanovich	6	3	[10]
2	(Hong Kong) E Chong (Chinese Taipei) E-s Liang	1	6	[7]

Quarterfinals
1	(United Kingdom) E Appleton (Japan) M Ninomiya	6	2	[6]
(United States) C Corley (United States) I Corley	4	6	[10]
4	(Portugal) F Jorge (Portugal) M Jorge	7	6
(Chinese Taipei) I-h Cho (Chinese Taipei) Y-t Cho	5	4
(France) C Monnet (Bulgaria) V Tomova	0	3
(United States) A Akli (United States) F Crawley	6	6
(Slovakia) V Hrunčáková (Czech Republic) G Knutson	6	6
(Romania) I Bara; I Shymanovich	3	3

Semifinals
(United States) C Corley (United States) I Corley	w/o
4	(Portugal) F Jorge (Portugal) M Jorge
(United States) A Akli (United States) F Crawley	1	3
(Slovakia) V Hrunčáková (Czech Republic) G Knutson	6	6

Final
(United States) C Corley (United States) I Corley	6^{7}	3
(Slovakia) V Hrunčáková (Czech Republic) G Knutson	7^{9}	6
