= 2026 Oeiras Indoors 2 – Singles =

Singles
- 2026 Oeiras Indoors 2

Final
- Champion: (Ukraine) Daria Snigur
- Runner-up: (Switzerland) Viktorija Golubic
- Score: 6-3, 6-3

Details
- Draw: 32 (4Q / 4WC)
- Seeds: 8

Events
Singles	Doubles
- Oeiras Indoors

Alina Korneeva was the defending champion, but chose to compete in Les Sables-d'Olonne instead.

Daria Snigur won the title, defeating Viktorija Golubic 6-3, 6-3 in the final.

== Seeds ==
1. (Switzerland) Viktorija Golubic (final)
2. (Austria) Sinja Kraus (quarterfinals)
3. (Netherlands) Suzan Lamens (semifinals)
4. (China) Yuan Yue (first round)
5. (Ukraine) Daria Snigur (champion)
6. (Poland) Linda Klimovičová (first round)
7. (Spain) Kaitlin Quevedo (quarterfinals)
8. (Bulgaria) Viktoriya Tomova (quarterfinals)

== Draw ==
Key

- Q = Qualifier
- WC = Wild card
- LL = Lucky loser
- Alt = Alternate
- ITF = ITF entry
- PR = Protected ranking
- SR = Special ranking
- SE = Special exempt
- JE = Junior exempt
- JR = Junior Accelerator Programme entrant
- CO = College Accelerator Programme entrant
- NG = Next Gen Accelerator Program entrant
- w/o = Walkover
- r = Retired
- d = Defaulted

=== Finals ===
Semifinals
1	(Switzerland) Viktorija Golubic	7	1	6
(Serbia) Teodora Kostović	5	6	2
3	(Netherlands) Suzan Lamens	3	3
5	(Ukraine) Daria Snigur	6	6

Final
1	(Switzerland) Viktorija Golubic	3	3
5	(Ukraine) Daria Snigur	6	6

=== Top half ===
First round
1	(Switzerland) V Golubic	6	6
WC	(Portugal) AF Santos	1	0
(United States) F Crawley	6	6
WC	(Portugal) M Matias	0	1
(Czech Republic) G Knutson	4	0^{r}
(United States) A Akli	6	1
WC	(United Kingdom) E Appleton	3	5
7	(Spain) K Quevedo	6	7
4	(China) Y Yuan	4	1
(Netherlands) A Koevermans	6	6
(Spain) S Sorribes Tormo	6	3	5
(Serbia) T Kostović	4	6	7
Q	(France) Y Mansouri	7^{7}	3	4
(Portugal) M Jorge	6^{4}	6	6
(Portugal) F Jorge	6	7
6	(Poland) L Klimovičová	3	5

Second round
1	(Switzerland) V Golubic	6	1	6
(United States) F Crawley	1	6	4
(United States) A Akli	3	1
7	(Spain) K Quevedo	6	6
(Netherlands) A Koevermans	3	3
(Serbia) T Kostović	6	6
(Portugal) M Jorge	0	0^{r}
(Portugal) F Jorge	6	0

Quarterfinals
1	(Switzerland) V Golubic	6	6
7	(Spain) K Quevedo	1	3
(Serbia) T Kostović	6	7^{15}
(Portugal) F Jorge	4	6^{13}

Semifinals
1	(Switzerland) V Golubic	7	1	6
(Serbia) T Kostović	5	6	2

=== Bottom half ===
First round
8	(Bulgaria) V Tomova	6	6
Q	(Slovenia) D Jakupović	2	4
A Tikhonova	1	4
Q	(Chinese Taipei) E-s Liang	6	6
(Armenia) E Avanesyan	2	6	4
WC	(Portugal) A Voloshchuk	6	4	6
(France) C Monnet	6	1	2
3	(Netherlands) S Lamens	4	6	6
5	(Ukraine) D Snigur	6	6
(Slovakia) V Hrunčáková	1	1
Q	(United Kingdom) N Bains	6	6
(Czech Republic) B Palicová	2	2
I Shymanovich	7	7^{7}
(Spain) N Párrizas Díaz	5	6^{4}
(Germany) C Werner	3	3
2	(Austria) S Kraus	6	6

Second round
8	(Bulgaria) V Tomova	2	7^{7}	6
Q	(Chinese Taipei) E-s Liang	6	6^{4}	2
WC	(Portugal) A Voloshchuk	1	4
3	(Netherlands) S Lamens	6	6
5	(Ukraine) D Snigur	6	6
Q	(United Kingdom) N Bains	2	0
I Shymanovich	2	3
2	(Austria) S Kraus	6	6

Quarterfinals
8	(Bulgaria) V Tomova	4	4
3	(Netherlands) S Lamens	6	6
5	(Ukraine) D Snigur	6	6
2	(Austria) S Kraus	1	0

Semifinals
3	(Netherlands) S Lamens	3	3
5	(Ukraine) D Snigur	6	6

== Qualifying ==
=== Seeds ===
1. (Chinese Taipei) Liang En-shuo (qualified)
2. (Slovenia) Dalila Jakupović (qualified)
3. (France) Yasmine Mansouri (qualified)
4. (United Kingdom) Naiktha Bains (qualified)
5. (Croatia) Lucija Ćirić Bagarić (first round)
6. (Germany) Gina Dittmann (qualifying competition)
7. (Ukraine) Nadiia Kolb (qualifying competition)
8. (Slovenia) Nika Radišić (qualifying competition, withdrew)

=== Qualifiers ===
1. (Chinese Taipei) Liang En-shuo
2. (Slovenia) Dalila Jakupović
3. (France) Yasmine Mansouri
4. (United Kingdom) Naiktha Bains

=== Qualifying draw ===
==== First qualifier ====
First round
1	(Chinese Taipei) Liang En-shuo	6	6
(Portugal) Teresa Franco Dias	0	1
WC	(Portugal) Kika Lima	2	1
6	(Germany) Gina Dittmann	6	6

Qualifying competition
1	(Chinese Taipei) Liang En-shuo	7	6
6	(Germany) Gina Dittmann	5	1

==== Second qualifier ====
First round
2	(Slovenia) Dalila Jakupović	7	6
(United Kingdom) Freya Christie	5	1
(Portugal) Sara Lança	1	2
8	(Slovenia) Nika Radišić	6	6

Qualifying competition
2	(Slovenia) Dalila Jakupović	w/o
8	(Slovenia) Nika Radišić

==== Third qualifier ====
First round
3	(France) Yasmine Mansouri	6	6
(Portugal) Analu Freitas	2	0
(Portugal) Gabriela Agra Amorim	2	3
7	(Ukraine) Nadiia Kolb	6	6

Qualifying competition
3	(France) Yasmine Mansouri	6	6
7	(Ukraine) Nadiia Kolb	3	2

==== Fourth qualifier ====
First round
4	(United Kingdom) Naiktha Bains	6	6
WC	(Japan) Makoto Ninomiya	4	1
WC	(United Kingdom) Eden Silva	6	5	6
5	(Croatia) Lucija Ćirić Bagarić	1	7	4

Qualifying competition
4	(United Kingdom) Naiktha Bains	6	6
WC	(United Kingdom) Eden Silva	1	3
