= CopperWynd Pro Women's Challenge =

ITF Women's Tour
- Event name: CopperWynd Pro Women's Challenge
- Location: Scottsdale, Arizona, United States
- Venue: CopperWynd Resort and Club
- Category: ITF Women's Circuit
- Surface: Hard
- Draw: 32S/32Q/16D
- Prize money: $50,000
- Website: arizonachallenger.com

The CopperWynd Pro Women's Challenge was a tournament for professional female tennis players played on outdoor hardcourts. The event was classified as a $50,000 ITF Women's Circuit tournament and was held in Scottsdale, U.S., 2015 and 2016.

== Past finals ==
=== Singles ===
Year	Champion	Runner-up	Score
2016	(Brazil) Beatriz Haddad Maia	(United States) Kristie Ahn	7–6^{(7–4)}, 7–6^{(7–2)}
2015	(United States) Samantha Crawford	(Switzerland) Viktorija Golubic	6–3, 4–6, 6–2

=== Doubles ===
Year	Champions	Runners-up	Score
2016	(United States) Ingrid Neel (United States) Taylor Townsend	(United States) Samantha Crawford (United States) Melanie Oudin	6–4, 6–3
2015	(Israel) Julia Glushko (Sweden) Rebecca Peterson	(Switzerland) Viktorija Golubic (Liechtenstein) Stephanie Vogt	4–6, 7–5, [10–6]
