= Viktorija Golubic =

Swiss tennis player (born 1992)

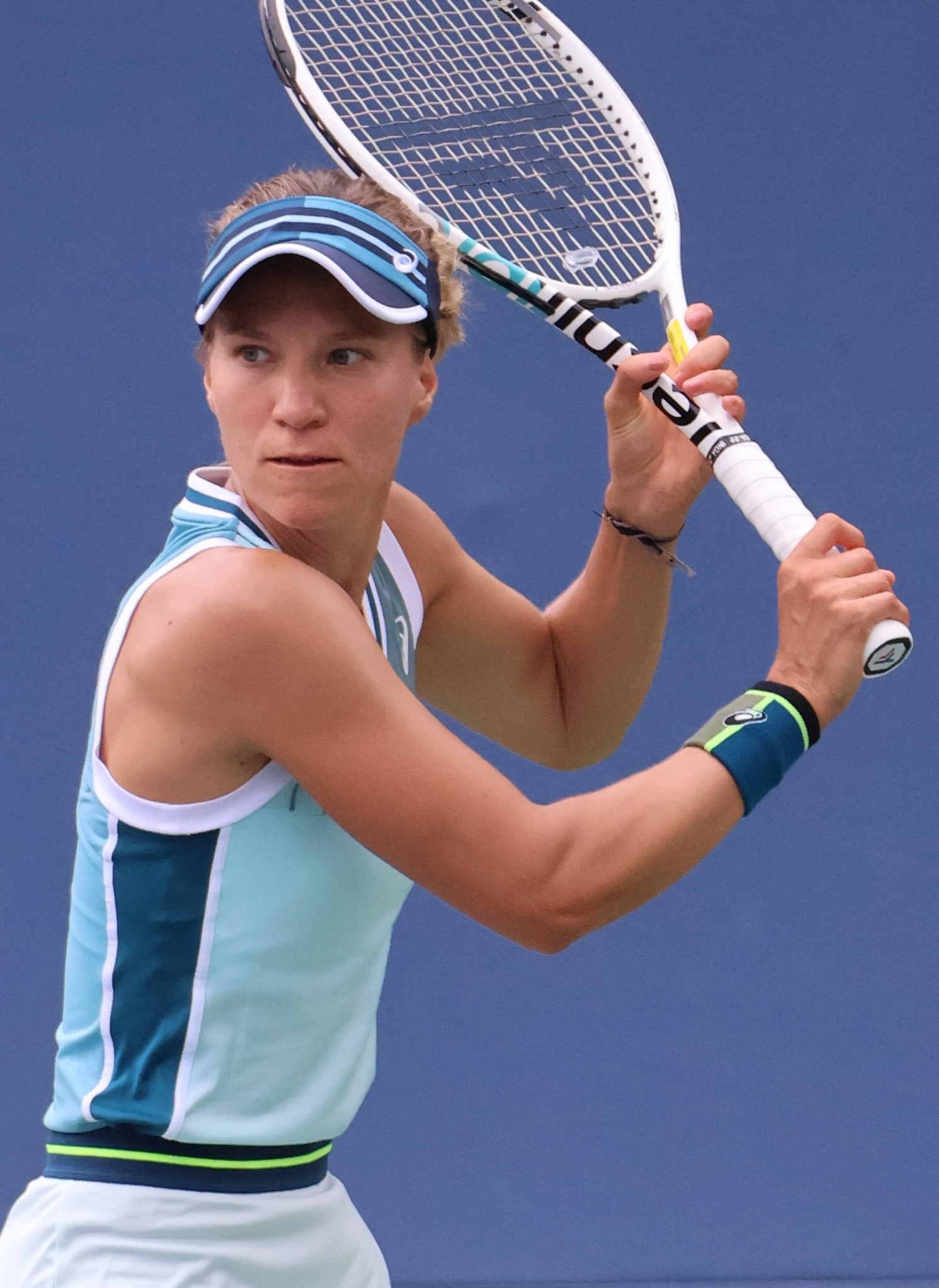
- Golubic at the 2023 US Open
- Country (sports): Switzerland
- Born: 16 October 1992 (age 34) Zürich, Switzerland
- Height: 1.69 m (5 ft 7 in)
- Plays: Right-handed (one-handed backhand)
- Coach: Robert Orlik
- Prize money: US$ 5,752,544

Singles
- Career record: 525–353
- Career titles: 2
- Highest ranking: No. 35 (28 February 2022)
- Current ranking: No. 67 (28 September 2026)

Grand Slam singles results
- Australian Open: 3R (2024)
- French Open: 3R (2026)
- Wimbledon: QF (2021)
- US Open: 2R (2025)

Other tournaments
- Olympic Games: 2R (2021)

Doubles
- Career record: 208–169
- Career titles: 0
- Highest ranking: No. 61 (17 April 2023)
- Current ranking: No. 1,079 (28 September 2025)

Grand Slam doubles results
- Australian Open: 3R (2017, 2018, 2023)
- French Open: 2R (2017, 2018, 2022)
- Wimbledon: 2R (2019, 2021, 2022)
- US Open: 3R (2019)

Team competitions
- Fed Cup: W (2022), record: 11–11
Medal record
Representing Switzerland
Olympic Games
Silver medal – second place	2020 Tokyo	Doubles
- Last updated on: 28 September 2026.

Viktorija Golubic (Serbian: Викторија Голубић / Viktorija Golubić; pronounced [ʋǐktoːrija ɡolǔbitɕ]; born 16 October 1992) is a Swiss professional tennis player. On 28 February 2022, she reached her career-high singles WTA ranking of No. 35. On 17 April 2023, she peaked at No. 61 in the doubles rankings. She is the current No. 2 Swiss player.

Golubic has won two singles titles on the WTA Tour, five singles WTA Challenger titles, as well as 12 singles and 15 doubles titles on the ITF Circuit so far.

== Career ==
=== 2008–15: WTA Tour debut and first win ===
Golubic started playing on the ITF Women's Circuit at the $10k event in Budapest in June 2008.

She made her WTA Tour main-draw debut at the Gastein Ladies in 2013, where she recorded her first WTA Tour win over Kiki Bertens, before losing in the second round to Andrea Hlaváčková in three sets.

=== 2016: Maiden WTA Tour title, top 100 ===
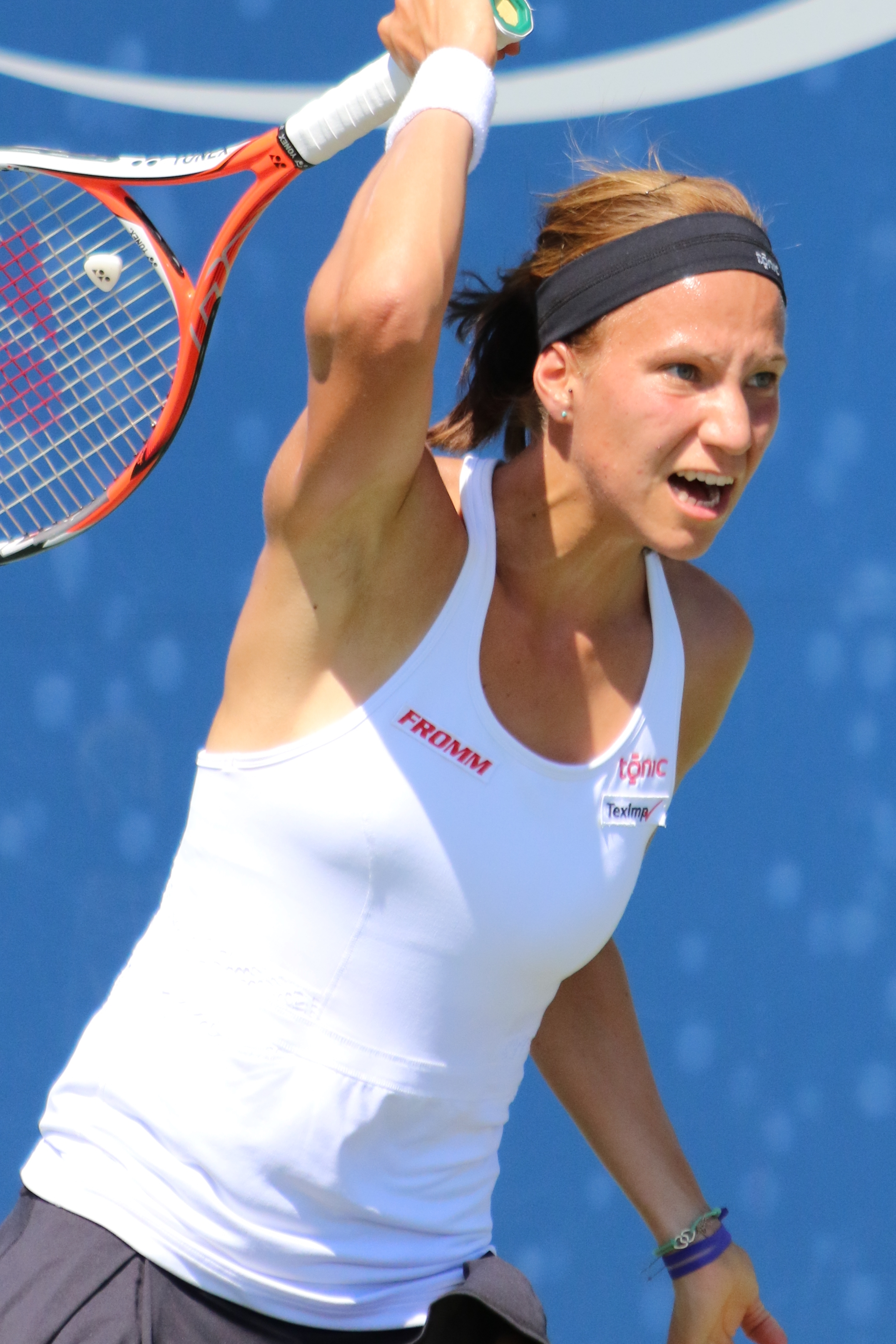
Golubic at the 2016 US Open

After winning her eighth ITF title at the $25k event in Hong Kong, Golubic reached her first major main draw at the Australian Open through qualifying and lost to Carla Suárez Navarro in the first round of the tournament. At the Katowice Open, Golubic entered the main-draw as a qualifier and beat Paula Kania in the first round before losing to Tímea Babos.

She qualified for the French Open and earned her first major main-draw win with a three-set victory over Alison Riske, before losing to Lucie Šafářová in round two.

Golubic started her grass-court season at the Rosmalen Championships, entering the main-draw as a qualifier and defeating Anna-Lena Friedsam and Risa Ozaki en route to her first tour quarterfinal, before losing to Belinda Bencic.

At the inaugural Ladies Championship Gstaad, Golubic defeated third seed Kiki Bertens in the final to win her first WTA title. With the title, Golubic entered the top 100 for the first time. She reached another final at the Linz Open, in which she was defeated by Dominika Cibulková. On her way to the final, she gained her first top-10 win by defeating world No. 6, Garbiñe Muguruza, in the quarterfinal, albeit by withdrawal when her opponent pulled out in the third set after spraining her ankle. She ended the season as No. 57 in the WTA rankings.

=== 2017–20: Wimbledon third round, WTA 125 title ===
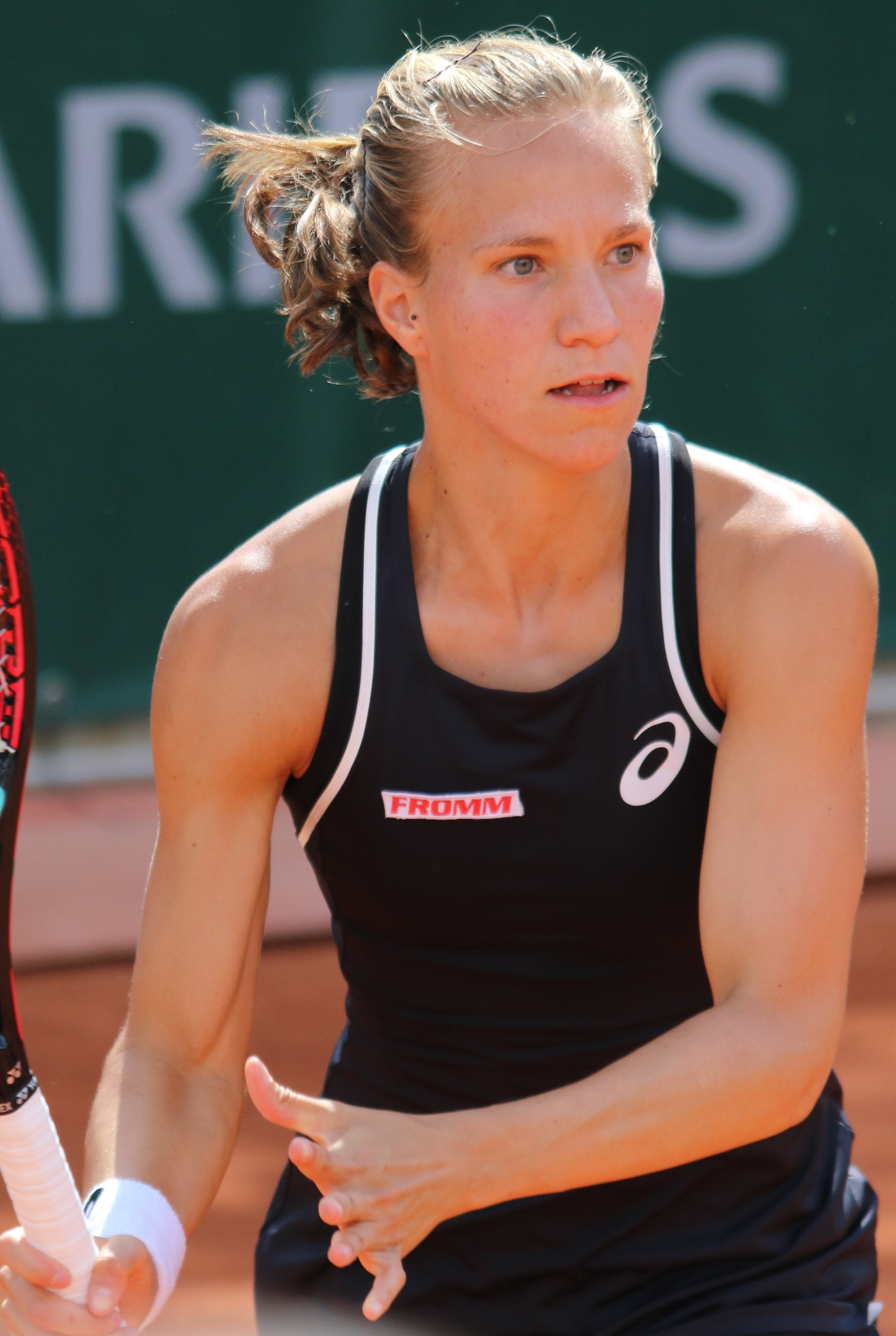
Golubic at the 2018 French Open

In 2017, Golubic could not emulate her results of the previous year. Despite winning only four matches in the first half of the season, she reached a new career-high singles ranking of 51, in April 2017. After that, she started to fall in the ranking and dropped out of the top 100 again. However, she had good results again in the late season. In October, she reached semifinals of the Linz Open, before losing to Magdaléna Rybáriková. She then played on the WTA Challenger Tour, where she reached two semifinals, at the Hua Hin Championships and the Taipei Challenger.

Golubic's most significant results in 2018 came at the ITF Circuit and WTA Challenger Tour. In the early season, she reached the final of the $60k Burnie International, losing there to Marta Kostyuk. Later, she reached quarterfinals of the Indian Wells Challenger, $100k Open de Cagnes-sur-Mer, Bol Open and Manchester Trophy. In October, she won the $80k Poitiers event, defeating Natalia Vikhlyantseva in the final. In June 2018, Golubic after almost one year reentered the top 100. She finished the year as world No. 92.

In the early 2019 season, ranked No. 106 Golubic reached the quarterfinal of the Thailand Open, where she lost to Tamara Zidanšek.

She then won her first WTA 125 title at the Indian Wells Challenger, saving a championship point against Jennifer Brady in the final. On her way to the title, she knocked out top seed Wang Qiang in the semifinals to mark her first top-20 win since October 2016.

At Wimbledon, she reached the third round of a major for the first time by defeating Iga Świątek and Yulia Putintseva, but then lost to Dayana Yastremska.

In September, she reached quarterfinals of the Jiangxi International Open, losing there to Elena Rybakina. She followed this with a semifinal appearance at the Guangzhou International Open, before losing to Samantha Stosur.

Golubic struggled with form during the following season. Her most significant result came at the $80k Open de Cagnes-sur-Mer in September, when she reached quarterfinals and lost to Sara Sorribes Tormo. She suffered first-round losses at the Australian Open and US Open, while she failed to qualify for the French Open. Golubic fell out of the top 100 in late February and finished the year as world No. 137.

=== 2021: WTA final, Major quarterfinal, top 50 ===
After qualifying for the main-draw at the Lyon Open in March, Golubic defeated Vera Lapko, Caroline Garcia, Greet Minnen and second seed Fiona Ferro to make it through to the final. She lost the championship match to fellow qualifier Clara Tauson. Two weeks later, again as a qualifier, at the Monterrey Open, she overcame fellow qualifier Anna Kalinskaya in the quarterfinals and eighth seed Ann Li in the last four, before losing to Leylah Fernandez in the final.

In May, Golubic won the title at the WTA 125 Saint Malo Open, defeating Jasmine Paolini in the final.

Moving onto the grass-court season, she made it into the quarterfinals at Eastbourne, where she lost to Anett Kontaveit in three sets. Ranked world No. 66 at Wimbledon, Golubic reached her first major quarterfinal, defeating 23rd seed Madison Keys in the fourth round to set up a last eight match against eighth seed Karolína Plíšková which she lost in straight sets. Having won 43 matches already in 2021, Golubic guaranteed herself a top 50 debut with this breakthrough run, moving 18 places to world No. 48 on 12 July 2021, having never passed the third round of this major before.

In October at the rescheduled event in Indian Wells, she overcame sixth seed Maria Sakkari in the second round, only to lose her next match to qualifier Anna Kalinskaya.

=== 2022–23: Indian Wells fourth round ===
Golubic began her 2022 season at Melbourne, where she made the quarterfinals but lost to second seed and eventual champion Simona Halep.

At the 2022 Indian Wells Open, she reached the fourth round at a WTA 1000-level for the first time in her career, but lost to Elena Rybakina.

Seeded ninth, Golubic defeated lucky loser Yana Morderger and Fiona Ferro to make it into the quarterfinals at the 2022 Strasbourg Open, losing in the last eight to Océane Dodin.

A win via retirement over second seed Emma Raducanu, followed by successes against Heather Watson and fifth seed Ajla Tomljanović, saw Golubic reach the semifinals at the 2022 Nottingham Open, at which point her run was ended by sixth seed Alison Riske. She was runner-up at the 2022 WTA 125 Rouen Open, losing to Maryna Zanevska in the final.

At the 2023 Nottingham Open, she defeated Jil Teichmann and fourth seed Donna Vekić to make it through to the quarterfinals, where she lost to qualifier Heather Watson. Golubic won the 2023 WTA 125 Rouen Open, defeating Erika Andreeva in the final.

=== 2024: First WTA title since 2016, Major third round, back to top 100 ===
At the Australian Open, she recorded her first wins at this major by defeating 15th seed Veronika Kudermetova and Kateřina Siniaková. She lost in the third round to 19th seed Elina Svitolina. As a result of her performance she returned to the top 75 in the rankings, at No. 71 on 29 January 2024.

Golubic defeated former champion and 24th seed Barbora Krejčíková in the first round at the French Open, but could not build on her momentum, losing her next match to Anastasia Potapova.

At the Jiangxi Open, she secured wins over qualifier You Xiaodi, fourth seed Jéssica Bouzas Maneiro and sixth seed Arantxa Rus to reach her first WTA Tour singles semifinal in more than two years. She defeated top seed Marie Bouzková to advance to her fifth career final and first since 2021. In the final, Golubic defeated second seed Rebecca Šramková in straight sets to claim her second WTA title, eight years after winning her first. Ranked No. 168, Golubic became the lowest-ranked WTA champion of the 2024 season. As a result she returned to the top 105 in the WTA singles rankings on 4 November 2024, raising more than 60 positions up.

Seeded seventh, Golubic overcame lucky loser Ekaterina Makarova, Mariam Bolkvadze, wildcard Carole Monnet, and sixth seed Nuria Parrizas-Diaz to reach the final at the Open de Limoges, where she defeated Céline Naef to take her fourth WTA 125 title. As a result, she returned to the top 100 in the WTA singles rankings, finishing the 2024 season at world No. 90 on 15 December 2024.

=== 2025: First US Open win ===
Seeded fourth, Golubic was runner-up at the WTA 125 Polish Open, losing to third seed Kateřina Siniaková in the final.

She defeated Lucia Bronzetti and seventh seed Katie Boulter to reach the quarterfinals at the Tennis in the Land tournament, at which point she lost to second seed Wang Xinyu in three sets.

At the US Open, Golubic defeated Loïs Boisson to record her first main-draw win at the event on her seventh appearance. She lost to 18th seed Beatriz Haddad Maia in the second round.

Golubic won her fifth WTA 125 title at the Suzhou Open, overcoming Katie Volynets in the final. Two weeks later at the Japan Open, she defeated Bianca Andreescu and fifth seed Marie Bouzková to reach the quarterfinals, where she lost to Sorana Cirstea in three sets.

Defending her title at the Jiangxi Open, she defeated qualifier Rina Saigo, lucky loser Elena Pridankina and fifth seed Yulia Putintseva to make it into the semifinals, where she lost to wildcard entrant Lilli Tagger in three sets.

=== 2026: French Open third round, Nottingham semifinal ===
In February, as the top seed at the WTA 125 Oeiras Indoors 2, Golubic reached the final, losing to fifth seed Daria Snigur in straight sets.

At the Italian Open, she defeated qualifier Federica Urgesi and 29th seed Maya Joint to reach the third round, where she lost to eighth seed Mirra Andreeva in three sets. Golubic reached the third round at the French Open for the first time, defeating Panna Udvardy and Alycia Parks, before losing to 15th seed Marta Kostyuk.

In June at the Nottingham Open, she overcame lucky loser Sofia Kenin in a rematch of the final qualifying round, and then recorded wins over Zeynep Sönmez and fifth seed Ann Li to make it through to the semifinals, where she lost to third seed Emma Navarro.

At the Canadian Open, Golubic defeated Kimberly Birrell and 31st seed Donna Vekić to reach the third round, at which point her run was ended by seventh seed and eventual champion Iga Świątek. She also made it through to the third round at the China Open with wins over lucky loser Elvina Kalieva and 28th seed Peyton Stearns, before losing to fifth seed Linda Nosková.

== National representation ==
=== Fed Cup ===
Playing for Switzerland at the Fed Cup, Golubic has a win–loss record of 11–11 (as of September 2024). During the 2016 Fed Cup semifinals, Golubic earned surprising wins over Karolína Plíšková and Barbora Strýcová, defeating both in three sets. Although Switzerland was not able to beat the Czech Republic, Golubic was praised for her performance.

=== Olympics ===
In her first participation at the Summer Olympics in Tokyo, Golubic advanced to the doubles final with Belinda Bencic by defeating Brazilian pair Laura Pigossi and Luisa Stefani. They took home silver medals after losing to Barbora Krejčíková and Kateřina Siniaková in straight sets.

== Performance timelines ==
Key
W	F	SF	QF	#R	RR	Q#	P#	DNQ	A	Z#	PO	G	S	B	NMS	NTI	P	NH

(W) winner; (F) finalist; (SF) semifinalist; (QF) quarterfinalist; (#R) rounds 4, 3, 2, 1; (RR) round-robin stage; (Q#) qualification round; (P#) preliminary round; (DNQ) did not qualify; (A) absent; (Z#) Davis/Fed Cup Zonal Group (with number indication) or (PO) play-off; (G) gold, (S) silver or (B) bronze Olympic/Paralympic medal; (NMS) not a Masters tournament; (NTI) not a Tier I tournament; (P) postponed; (NH) not held; (SR) strike rate (events won / competed); (W–L) win–loss record.
To avoid confusion and double counting, these charts are updated at the conclusion of a tournament or when the player's participation has ended.

Only main-draw results in WTA Tour, Grand Slam tournaments, Fed Cup/Billie Jean King Cup, Hopman Cup, United Cup and Olympic Games are included in win–loss records.

=== Singles ===
Current through the 2026 China Open.

Tournament	2013	2014	2015	2016	2017	2018	2019	2020	2021	2022	2023	2024	2025	2026	SR	W–L	Win %
Grand Slam tournaments
Australian Open	A	Q1	Q2	1R	1R	1R	1R	1R	Q2	1R	1R	3R	1R	1R	0 / 10	2–10	17%
French Open	A	Q1	A	2R	1R	1R	1R	Q1	1R	1R	Q1	2R	2R	3R	0 / 9	5–9	36%
Wimbledon	A	Q1	A	Q2	2R	1R	3R	NH	QF	2R	2R	1R	1R	2R	0 / 9	10–9	53%
US Open	Q2	Q1	A	1R	1R	Q2	1R	1R	1R	1R	Q2	1R	2R	1R	0 / 9	1–9	10%
Win–loss	0–0	0–0	0–0	1–3	1–4	0–3	2–4	0–2	4–3	1–4	1–2	3–4	2–4	3–4	0 / 37	18–37	33%
National representation
Summer Olympics	NH			A	NH				2R	NH		1R	NH		0 / 2	1–2	33%
Billie Jean King Cup (Note: Formerly known as Fed Cup until 2020.)	A	WG2	PO	SF	SF	1R	PO	F (Note: Edition is split into the two years due to COVID-19.)		W	RR	PO	Q		1 / 9	9–9	50%
WTA 1000 tournaments
Qatar Open	A	A	NTI	A	NTI	A	NTI	Q1	NTI	2R	NTI	A	A	A	0 / 1	1–1	50%
Dubai Championships	NTI	NTI	A	NTI	2R	NTI	A	NTI	A	NTI	A	A	A	A	0 / 1	1–1	50%
Indian Wells Open	A	A	A	Q1	1R	Q1	1R	NH	3R	4R	Q1	A	1R	Q1	0 / 5	4–5	44%
Miami Open	A	A	A	A	2R	1R	1R	NH	A	2R	2R	A	A	1R	0 / 6	3–6	33%
Madrid Open	A	A	A	A	1R	A	Q1	NH	A	1R	A	A	A	1R	0 / 3	0–3	0%
Italian Open	A	A	A	A	A	A	Q2	A	A	1R	A	Q2	2R	3R	0 / 3	2–3	40%
Canadian Open	A	A	A	A	A	A	A	NH	1R	A	A	A	A	3R	0 / 2	2–2	50%
Cincinnati Open	A	A	A	1R	A	A	Q1	A	Q1	A	A	A	A	2R	0 / 2	1–2	33%
Wuhan Open (Note: In 2014, the Pan Pacific Open was downgraded to a Premier event and replaced by the Wuhan Open. The Premier 5 tournaments were reclassified as WTA 1000 tournaments in 2021.)	A	A	A	A	A	2R	A	NH				A	A		0 / 1	1–1	50%
China Open	A	A	A	A	A	A	A	NH			A	2R	1R	3R	0 / 3	3–3	33%
Win–loss	0–0	0–0	0–0	0–1	2–4	1–2	0–2	0–0	2–2	4–5	1–1	1–1	0–3	7–6	0 / 27	18–27	40%
Career statistics
	2013	2014	2015	2016	2017	2018	2019	2020	2021	2022	2023	2024	2025	2026	SR	W–L	Win %
Tournaments	1	1	0	12	17	10	14	3	16	20	12	15	15	7	Career total: 106		
Titles	0	0	0	1	0	0	0	0	0	0	0	1	0	0	Career total: 1		
Finals	0	0	0	2	0	0	0	0	2	0	0	1	0	0	Career total: 4		
Overall win–loss	1–1	1–1	0–0	19–11	9–19	3–12	13–15	0–3	21–17	19–20	5–13	13–14	10–15	5–8	2 / 151	119–149	44%
Win %	50%	50%	–	63%	32%	20%	46%	0%	55%	49%	28%	48%	40%	38%	Career total: 44%		
Year-end ranking (Note: 2010: WTA ranking–936, 2011: WTA ranking–564, 2012: WTA ranking–609.)	193	227	178	57	128	92	81	137	43	77	84	108	69		$5,092,907		

=== Doubles ===
Tournament	2014	2015	2016	2017	2018	2019	2020	2021	2022	2023	SR	W–L	Win %
Grand Slam tournaments
Australian Open	A	A	A	3R	3R	A	2R	A	1R	3R	0 / 5	7–5	58%
French Open	A	A	A	2R	2R	1R	A	1R	2R (Note: Withdrawal during the tournament not counted as a loss.)	A	0 / 5	3–4	43%
Wimbledon	A	A	Q1	1R	1R	2R	NH	2R	2R	A	0 / 5	3–5	38%
US Open	A	A	2R	1R	A	3R	A	1R	A	A	0 / 4	3–4	43%
Win–loss	0–0	0–0	1–1	3–4	3–3	3–3	1–1	1–3	2–2	2–1	0 / 19	16–18	47%
National representation
Summer Olympics	NH		A	NH				S			0 / 1	4–1	80%
Billie Jean King Cup	PO	PO	SF	SF	1R	PO	F				0 / 4	4–2	67%
WTA 1000 tournaments
Qatar Open	A	NTI	A	NTI	A	NTI	A	NTI	1R	NTI	0 / 1	0–1	33%
Dubai Championships	NTI	A	NTI	2R	NTI	A	NTI	A	NTI		0 / 1	1–1	50%
Indian Wells Open	A	A	A	A	A	A	NH	1R	A		0 / 1	0–1	0%
Madrid Open	A	A	A	A	A	A	NH	A	QF		0 / 1	2–1	67%
Italian Open	A	A	A	A	A	A	A	A	1R		0 / 1	0–1	0%

== Significant finals ==
=== Summer Olympics ===
==== Doubles: 1 (silver medal) ====
Result	Year	Tournament	Surface	Partner	Opponents	Score
Silver	2021	Tokyo Olympics 2020	Hard	(Switzerland) Belinda Bencic	(Czech Republic) Barbora Krejčíková (Czech Republic) Kateřina Siniaková	5–7, 1–6

== WTA Tour finals ==
=== Singles: 5 (2 titles, 3 runner-ups) ===
Legend WTA 250 (International) (2–3)	Finals by surface Hard (1–3) Clay (1–0)	Finals by setting Outdoor (2–1) Indoor (0–2)

Result	W–L	Date	Tournament	Tier	Surface	Opponent	Score
Win	1–0	Jul 2016	Swiss Open Gstaad, Switzerland	International	Clay	(Netherlands) Kiki Bertens	4–6, 6–3, 6–4
Loss	1–1	Oct 2016	Linz Open, Austria	International	Hard (i)	(Slovakia) Dominika Cibulková	3–6, 5–7
Loss	1–2	Mar 2021	Lyon Open, France	WTA 250	Hard (i)	(Denmark) Clara Tauson	4–6, 1–6
Loss	1–3	Mar 2021	Monterrey Open, Mexico	WTA 250	Hard	(Canada) Leylah Fernandez	1–6, 4–6
Win	2–3	Nov 2024	Jiangxi Open, China	WTA 250	Hard	(Slovakia) Rebecca Šramková	6–3, 7–5

=== Doubles: 2 (2 runner-ups) ===
Legend WTA 250 (International) (0–2)	Finals by surface Hard (0–1) Clay (0–1)	Finals by setting Outdoor (0–2)

Result	W–L	Date	Tournament	Tier	Surface	Partner	Opponents	Score
Loss	0–1	Jul 2017	Swiss Open Gstaad, Switzerland	International	Clay	(Serbia) Nina Stojanović	(Netherlands) Kiki Bertens (Sweden) Johanna Larsson	6–7^{(4–7)}, 6–4, [7–10]
Loss	0–2	Jan 2023	Hobart International, Australia	WTA 250	Hard	(Hungary) Panna Udvardy	(Belgium) Kirsten Flipkens (Germany) Laura Siegemund	4–6, 5–7

== WTA Challenger finals ==
=== Singles: 8 (5 titles, 3 runner-ups) ===
Result	W–L	Date	Tournament	Surface	Opponent	Score
Win	1–0	Mar 2019	WTA 125 Indian Wells, United States	Hard	(United States) Jennifer Brady	3–6, 7–5, 6–3
Win	2–0	May 2021	WTA 125 Saint-Malo, France	Clay	(Italy) Jasmine Paolini	6–1, 6–3
Loss	2–1	Oct 2022	WTA 125 Rouen, France	Hard (i)	(Belgium) Maryna Zanevska	6–7^{(6–8)}, 1–6
Win	3–1	Oct 2023	WTA 125 Rouen, France	Hard (i)	Erika Andreeva	6–4, 6–1
Win	4–1	Dec 2024	WTA 125 Limoges, France	Hard (i)	(Switzerland) Céline Naef	7–5, 6–4
Loss	4–2	Jul 2025	WTA 125 Warsaw, Poland	Hard	(Czech Republic) Kateřina Siniaková	1–6, 2–6
Win	5–2	Oct 2025	WTA 125 Suzhou, China	Hard	(United States) Katie Volynets	4–6, 6–4, 6–4
Loss	5–3	Feb 2026	WTA 125 Oeiras, Portugal	Hard (i)	(Ukraine) Daria Snigur	3–6, 3–6

== ITF Circuit finals ==
=== Singles: 22 (12 titles, 10 runner-ups) ===
Legend $100,000 tournaments (2–0) $80,000 tournaments (1–0) $50/60,000 tournaments (1–2) $25,000 tournaments (4–8) $10,000 tournaments (4–0)	Finals by surface Hard (9–7) Clay (3–3)

Result	W–L	Date	Tournament	Tier	Surface	Opponent	Score
Win	1–0	May 2011	ITF Santa Coloma de Farners, Spain	10,000	Clay	(Spain) Inés Ferrer Suárez	6–3, 6–3
Win	2–0	Sep 2011	ITF Lleida, Spain	10,000	Clay	(Spain) Lucía Cervera Vázquez	6–1, 7–6^{(5)}
Win	3–0	Apr 2013	ITF Antalya, Turkey	10,000	Hard	(Sweden) Ellen Allgurin	6–4, 6–2
Win	4–0	Apr 2013	ITF Antalya, Turkey	10,000	Hard	(Philippines) Katharina Lehnert	6–2, 6–3
Win	5–0	Jun 2013	ITF Brescia, Italy	25,000	Clay	(Italy) Anastasia Grymalska	6–4, 6–4
Loss	5–1	Jun 2013	ITF Stuttgart, Germany	25,000	Clay	(Germany) Laura Siegemund	3–6, 6–3, 6–7^{(4)}
Loss	5–2	Jan 2014	ITF Sunderland, United Kingdom	25,000	Hard (i)	(Belgium) An-Sophie Mestach	1–6, 4–6
Loss	5–3	Jul 2014	ITF Darmstadt, Germany	25,000	Clay	(Romania) Andreea Mitu	2–6, 1–6
Loss	5–4	Sep 2014	ITF Barnstaple, United Kingdom	25,000	Hard (i)	(Germany) Carina Witthöft	2–6, 4–6
Loss	5–5	Nov 2014	ITF Istanbul, Turkey	25,000	Hard (i)	(Czech Republic) Barbora Krejčíková	1–6, 4–6
Loss	5–6	Jun 2015	ITF Essen, Germany	25,000	Clay	(France) Pauline Parmentier	6–3, 6–7^{(4)}, 3–6
Win	6–6	Aug 2015	ITF Woking, United Kingdom	25,000	Hard	(United Kingdom) Katy Dunne	6–4, 6–4
Loss	6–7	Oct 2015	ITF Clermont-Ferrand, France	25,000	Hard (i)	(Russia) Polina Leykina	6–4, 3–6, 4–6
Win	7–7	Nov 2015	ITF Waco, United States	50,000	Hard	(United States) Nicole Gibbs	6–2, 6–1
Loss	7–8	Nov 2015	ITF Scottsdale, United States	50,000	Hard	(United States) Samantha Crawford	3–6, 6–4, 2–6
Win	8–8	Jan 2016	ITF Hong Kong, China SAR	25,000	Hard	(Japan) Risa Ozaki	6–3, 6–3
Loss	8–9	Feb 2018	ITF Burnie, Australia	60,000	Hard	(Ukraine) Marta Kostyuk	4–6, 3–6
Win	9–9	Oct 2018	ITF Poitiers, France	80,000	Hard (i)	(Russia) Natalia Vikhlyantseva	3–6, 6–1, 7–5
Loss	9–10	Jan 2021	ITF Fujairah City, U.A.E.	25,000	Hard	(Denmark) Clara Tauson	0–6, 6–4, 3–6
Win	10–10	Feb 2021	ITF Grenoble, France	25,000	Hard (i)	(Belgium) Maryna Zanevska	6–1, 4–6, 7–6^{(2)}
Win	11–10	Sep 2023	ITF Tokyo, Japan	100,000	Hard	(China) Wang Xiyu	6–4, 3–6, 6–4
Win	12–10	Oct 2023	ITF Shrewsbury, United Kingdom	100,000	Hard (i)	(United Kingdom) Amarni Banks	6–0, 6–0

=== Doubles: 32 (15 titles, 17 runner–ups) ===
Legend $100,000 tournaments (0–1) $80,000 tournaments (0–2) $50/60,000 tournaments (3–6) $25,000 tournaments (8–5) $10/15,000 tournaments (4–3)	Finals by surface Hard (7–10) Clay (7–6) Grass (0–1) Carpet (1–0)

Result	W–L	Date	Tournament	Tier	Surface	Partner	Opponents	Score
Loss	0–1	May 2011	ITF Santa Coloma de Farners, Spain	10,000	Clay	(Germany) Nina Zander	(Spain) Eva Fernández Brugués (Spain) Inés Ferrer Suárez	3–6, 7–6^{(3)}, [4–10]
Loss	0–2	Sep 2011	ITF Lleida, Spain	10,000	Clay	(Spain) Arabela Fernández; Rabener	(Spain) Yvonne Cavallé Reimers (Spain) Isabel Rapisarda Calvo	2–6, 6–7^{(5)}
Win	1–2	Nov 2011	ITF La Vall d'Uixó, Spain	10,000	Clay	(Poland) Magdalena Kiszczyńska	(Spain) Yvonne Cavallé Reimers (Spain) Arabela Fernández Rabener	7–5, 3–6, [10–8]
Loss	1–3	May 2012	ITF Caserta, Italy	25,000	Clay	(Serbia) Aleksandra Krunić	(Poland) Katarzyna Piter (Slovakia) Romana Tabak	2–6, 3–6
Win	2–3	Jan 2013	ITF Stuttgart, Germany	10,000	Hard (i)	(Germany) Julia Kimmelmann	(Russia) Olga Doroshina (Russia) Julia Valetova	6–4, 6–1
Win	3–3	Jan 2013	ITF Kaarst, Germany	10,000	Carpet (i)	(Germany) Julia Kimmelmann	(Slovenia) Anja Prislan (Germany) Jasmin Steinherr	6–3, 4–6, [10–5]
Loss	3–4	Mar 2013	ITF Bath, United Kingdom	15,000	Hard (i)	(Germany) Julia Kimmelmann	(Germany) Nicola Geuer (United Kingdom) Lisa Whybourn	3–6, 4–6
Win	4–4	Apr 2013	ITF Antalya, Turkey	10,000	Hard	(Philippines) Katharina Lehnert	(Czech Republic) Martina Borecká (Czech Republic) Petra Krejsová	5–7, 6–3, [10–7]
Loss	4–5	May 2013	ITF Grado, Italy	25,000	Clay	(Latvia) Diāna Marcinkēviča	(Japan) Yurika Sema (China) Zhou Yimiao	6–1, 5–7, [7–10]
Win	5–5	Oct 2013	ITF Limoges, France	50,000	Hard (i)	(Poland) Magda Linette	(Italy) Nicole Clerico (Czech Republic) Nikola Fraňková	6–4, 6–4
Win	6–5	May 2014	ITF Wiesbaden, Germany	25,000	Clay	(Latvia) Diāna Marcinkēviča	(Israel) Julia Glushko (Luxembourg) Mandy Minella	6–4, 6–3
Win	7–5	Jun 2014	ITF Stuttgart, Germany	25,000	Clay	(Germany) Laura Siegemund	(Netherlands) Lesley Kerkhove (Netherlands) Arantxa Rus	6–3, 6–3
Win	8–5	Jul 2014	ITF Darmstadt, Germany	25,000	Clay	(Germany) Nicola Geuer	(Germany) Carolin Daniels (Germany) Laura Schaeder	5–7, 6–2, [10–3]
Loss	8–6	Sep 2014	ITF Barnstaple, United Kingdom	25,000	Hard (i)	(Latvia) Diāna Marcinkēviča	(France) Alizé Lim (Germany) Carina Witthöft	2–6, 1–6
Loss	8–7	Sep 2014	ITF Shrewsbury, United Kingdom	25,000	Hard (i)	(Germany) Nicola Geuer	(Netherlands) Richèl Hogenkamp (Netherlands) Lesley Kerkhove	6–2, 5–7, [8–10]
Win	9–7	Feb 2015	ITF St. Petersburg, Russia	50,000	Hard (i)	(Belarus) Aliaksandra Sasnovich	(France) Stéphanie Foretz (Croatia) Ana Vrljić	6–4, 7–5
Win	10–7	May 2015	ITF Wiesbaden, Germany	25,000	Clay	(Germany) Carolin Daniels	(Netherlands) Cindy Burger (Ukraine) Veronika Kapshay	6–4, 4–6, [10–6]
Win	11–7	May 2015	ITF Grado, Italy	25,000	Clay	(Brazil) Beatriz Haddad Maia	(Canada) Sharon Fichman (Poland) Katarzyna Piter	6–3, 6–2
Win	12–7	Jun 2015	ITF Essen, Germany	25,000	Clay	(Germany) Nicola Geuer	(Germany) Carolin Daniels (Germany) Antonia Lottner	6–3, 6–3
Loss	12–8	Oct 2015	ITF Joué-lès-Tours, France	50,000	Hard (i)	(Italy) Alice Matteucci	(Romania) Alexandra Cadanțu (Romania) Cristina Dinu	5–7, 3–6
Win	13–8	Oct 2015	ITF Macon, United States	50,000	Hard	(United States) Jan Abaza	(Brazil) Paula Cristina Gonçalves (United States) Sanaz Marand	7–6^{(3)}, 7–5
Loss	13–9	Nov 2015	ITF Scottsdale, United States	50,000	Hard	(Liechtenstein) Stephanie Vogt	(Israel) Julia Glushko (Sweden) Rebecca Peterson	6–4, 5–7, [6–10]
Win	14–9	Jan 2016	ITF Hong Kong, China SAR	25,000	Hard	(Liechtenstein) Stephanie Vogt	(Chinese Taipei) Hsu Ching-wen (Finland) Emma Laine	6–2, 1–6, [10–4]
Loss	14–10	Jan 2016	ITF Andrézieux-Bouthéon, France	50,000	Hard (i)	(Switzerland) Xenia Knoll	(Belgium) Elise Mertens (Belgium) An-Sophie Mestach	4–6, 6–3, [7–10]
Loss	14–11	May 2016	ITF Saint-Gaudens, France	50,000	Clay	(Germany) Nicola Geuer	(Netherlands) Demi Schuurs (Czech Republic) Renata Voráčová	1–6, 2–6
Loss	14–12	Jun 2017	ITF Southsea, United Kingdom	100,000	Grass	(Ukraine) Lyudmyla Kichenok	(Japan) Shuko Aoyama (China) Yang Zhaoxuan	7–6^{(7)}, 3–6, [8–10]
Loss	14–13	Sep 2017	ITF Albuquerque, United States	80,000	Hard	(Switzerland) Amra Sadiković	(Switzerland) Conny Perrin (United Kingdom) Tara Moore	3–6, 3–6
Loss	14–14	Oct 2017	ITF Templeton, United States	60,000	Hard	(Switzerland) Amra Sadiković	(United States) Kaitlyn Christian (Mexico) Giuliana Olmos	5–7, 3–6
Loss	14–15	Oct 2018	ITF Poitiers, France	80,000	Hard (i)	(Netherlands) Arantxa Rus	(Russia) Anna Blinkova (Russia) Alexandra Panova	1–6, 1–6
Loss	14–16	Sep 2020	ITF Saint-Malo, France	60,000	Clay	(Poland) Magdalena Fręch	(Poland) Paula Kania (Poland) Katarzyna Piter	2–6, 4–6
Win	15–16	Jan 2021	ITF Fujairah City, U.A.E.	25,000	Hard	(Turkey) Çağla Büyükakçay	(Chinese Taipei) Liang En-shuo (China) You Xiaodi	5–7, 6–4, [10–4]
Loss	15–17	Feb 2021	ITF Altenkirchen, Germany	25,000	Carpet (i)	(Switzerland) Ylena In-Albon	(Poland) Paula Kania (Germany) Julia Wachaczyk	6–7^{(5)}, 4–6

== Wins against top 10 players ==
No.	Player	Rk	Event	Surface	Rd	Score	Rk	Years	Ref
1	(Spain) Garbiñe Muguruza	No. 6	Linz Open, Austria	Hard (i)	QF	5–7, 6–3, 4–4 ret.		2016	
2	(Greece) Maria Sakkari	No. 9	Indian Wells Open, US	Hard	2R	5–7, 6–3, 6–2		2021	

- Key: (Rk) first use, opponent rank; (Rd) round; (Rk) 2nd use, player rank; (Ref) reference; (F) final; (SF) semifinal; (QF) quarterfinal; (#R) rounds 4, 3, 2, 1; (RR) round-robin stage; (Q#) qualifying rounds or stages (3), 2, 1.
