= Kylie McKenzie =

American tennis player

- Country (sports): United States
- Born: 21 March 1999 (age 26)
- Plays: Right-handed
- Prize money: US$20,460

Singles
- Career record: 88–66
- Highest ranking: No. 644 (November 27, 2023)
- Current ranking: No. 1048 (November 10, 2025)

Grand Slam singles results
- US Open Junior: QF (2015)

Doubles
- Career record: 3–12
- Highest ranking: No. 777 (March 6, 2017)

Grand Slam doubles results
- US Open Junior: 1R (2015, 2016)
- Last updated on: 10 November 2025.

Kylie McKenzie (born 21 March 1999) is an American tennis player from Arizona.

== Junior career ==
From Phoenix, Arizona, McKenzie joined the United States Tennis Association’s full-time training team in California at twelve years-old. She subsequently won the national under-16 championship at fifteen years-old. McKenzie played in the 2015 US Girls’ singles, where she reached the quarter-final before losing to Fanny Stollar.

Aged eighteen she transferred to the USTA facility in Orlando, Florida. McKenzie alleged coach Anibal Aranda touched her vagina after a practice in November 2018 at the USTA's training center in Florida when she was nineteen years-old. McKenzie has since said that the sexual abuse had negatively affected her confidence, self-esteem and caused anxiety that had a detrimental effect on her tennis career. The Police stated there was probable cause for a charge of battery, and turned the evidence over to the state attorney's office, which ultimately opted not to pursue a case. The coach was suspended and then fired by the USTA.

=== Legal action ===
In March 2022 McKenzie filed a federal lawsuit against the United States Tennis Association after an investigation by SafeSport found it was "more likely than not" that she had suffered a sexual assault by a coach at a United States Tennis Association training centre. In May 2024, a jury in Florida awarded McKenzie $3m in compensation with an additional $6m in punitive damages.

== Professional career ==
McKenzie began a professional tennis career in August 2021, based at the iTUSA Tennis Academy in Glendale. In March 2023 she reached the final of an ITF W15 event in Monastir before she was defeated by Nina Radovanovic in the final.

== ITF Circuit finals ==
=== Singles: 1 (runner-up) ===
Legend W15 tournaments	Finals by surface Hard (0–1)

Result	No.	Date	Tournament	Tier	Surface	Opponent	Score
Loss	0–1	Mar 2023	ITF Monastir, Tunisia	W15	Hard	(France) Nina Radovanovic	2–6, 3–6
