= Rebecca Peterson =

Swedish tennis player (born 1995)

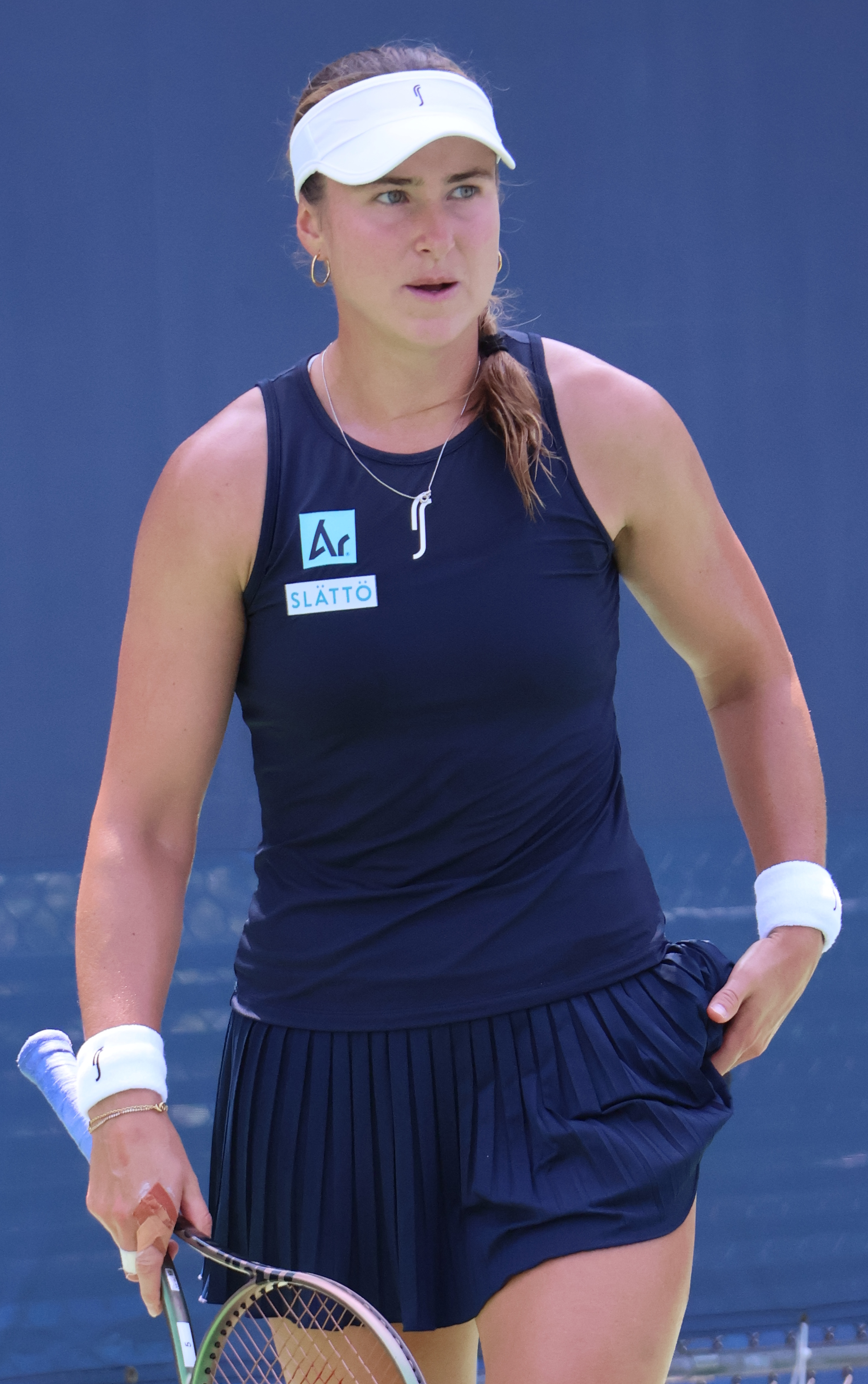
- Peterson at the 2023 Washington
- Country (sports): Sweden
- Residence: Stockholm, Sweden
- Born: 6 August 1995 (age 30) Stockholm
- Height: 1.73 m (5 ft 8 in)
- Turned pro: 2009
- Plays: Right-handed (two-handed backhand)
- Coach: Mart Peterson (her father)
- Prize money: US$ 3,035,877

Singles
- Career record: 353–219
- Career titles: 2
- Highest ranking: No. 43 (21 October 2019)

Grand Slam singles results
- Australian Open: 2R (2019, 2022)
- French Open: 2R (2018, 2019, 2021, 2023)
- Wimbledon: 2R (2018)
- US Open: 3R (2018)

Other tournaments
- Olympic Games: 2R (2021)

Doubles
- Career record: 94–79
- Career titles: 1
- Highest ranking: No. 87 (5 December 2022)

Grand Slam doubles results
- Australian Open: QF (2022)
- French Open: 2R (2019)
- Wimbledon: 2R (2019)
- US Open: 2R (2021, 2022)

Team competitions
- Fed Cup: 12–11
- Last updated on: 4 August 2026.

Rebecca Peterson (born 6 August 1995) is a Swedish inactive professional tennis player. She has been ranked as high as world No. 43 in singles and No. 87 in doubles by the WTA.

Peterson has reached three singles finals on the WTA Tour, winning two of them. She has also reached one WTA Tour doubles final in 2015, in which she also succeeded to win the title. She also owns a doubles title on the WTA Challenger Tour. On the ITF Women's Circuit, she won twelve singles and six doubles titles.

She had her breakthrough into the top 100 in May 2018, so she could play in main draw at most of the WTA Tour tournaments. She got most recognition in 2019, when she won two singles titles and also recorded her first top-ten win, against Sloane Stephens at the Washington Open. Also, in 2019, she entered top 50 for the first time. She made her Grand Slam debut at the 2017 US Open where she lost in the first round to Denisa Allertová. Among other players, Rebecca is most famous for her aggressive style of play, and she loves to force her forehand. During the 2018 season, she and Johanna Larsson took turns for the Swedish No. 1 in the WTA rankings. After Larsson's retirement in February 2020, Peterson was left as the only Swede inside the top 100 of the WTA rankings.

== Early life and background ==
Rebecca Peterson was born to a Swedish mother, Annelie, and an Estonian father, Mart, in Stockholm. She has one sister, Berit. Her father is her current tennis coach, together with Bosse Ericsson. Rebecca prefers aggressive game style, and likes to control the game with her forehand. While growing up she enjoyed watching Kim Clijsters and Justine Henin.

== Junior career ==
Peterson began playing on the ITF Junior Circuit at age 13. She reached a career-high ranking of No. 24 as a junior, and won one singles title and four doubles titles, winning all of them in 2010. In singles, her first tournament was Salk Open in January 2009, where she also got her first win, but then lost in the second round. In doubles, her first tournament was the Estonian Junior Open, held in June 2009, where she again lost in the first round. At the same tournament, she reached quarterfinals in singles.

In 2010, she played her first doubles final at the Salk Open, and also won the title. In May 2010, she played in the semifinals of Tennis Sweden Junior Cup in singles, whilst in doubles she won title. In October 2010, she won the Mian-Chang Cup International Junior Championships, her first junior singles title. There, she also won title in doubles.

In June 2012, she played her first junior major event, at the French Open, where in singles, after passing qualifying, she reached the third round, while in doubles she lost in the second round. In Wimbledon and the US Open, she lost in the first round in both singles and doubles. In 2013, she played the second round of the Australian Open in singles, and the first round in doubles. Her last junior tournament was the European Summer Cups in September 2013.

== Professional career ==
=== 2009–12: Playing in both juniors and seniors on the ITF Circuit ===
Despite the fact that she made her first doubles match on the ITF Women's Circuit in October 2009, she also continued to play in juniors. In 2010, she played qualifying for the Swedish Open but failed to reach main draw. Her first singles tournament was in November 2010 at Stockholm where she defeated German player Alina Wessel in the first round but lost to Alison Van Uytvanck in the second. In 2011, Peterson won only one singles and one doubles match, both at Båstad in May.

=== 2012–17: First steps on the WTA Tour ===
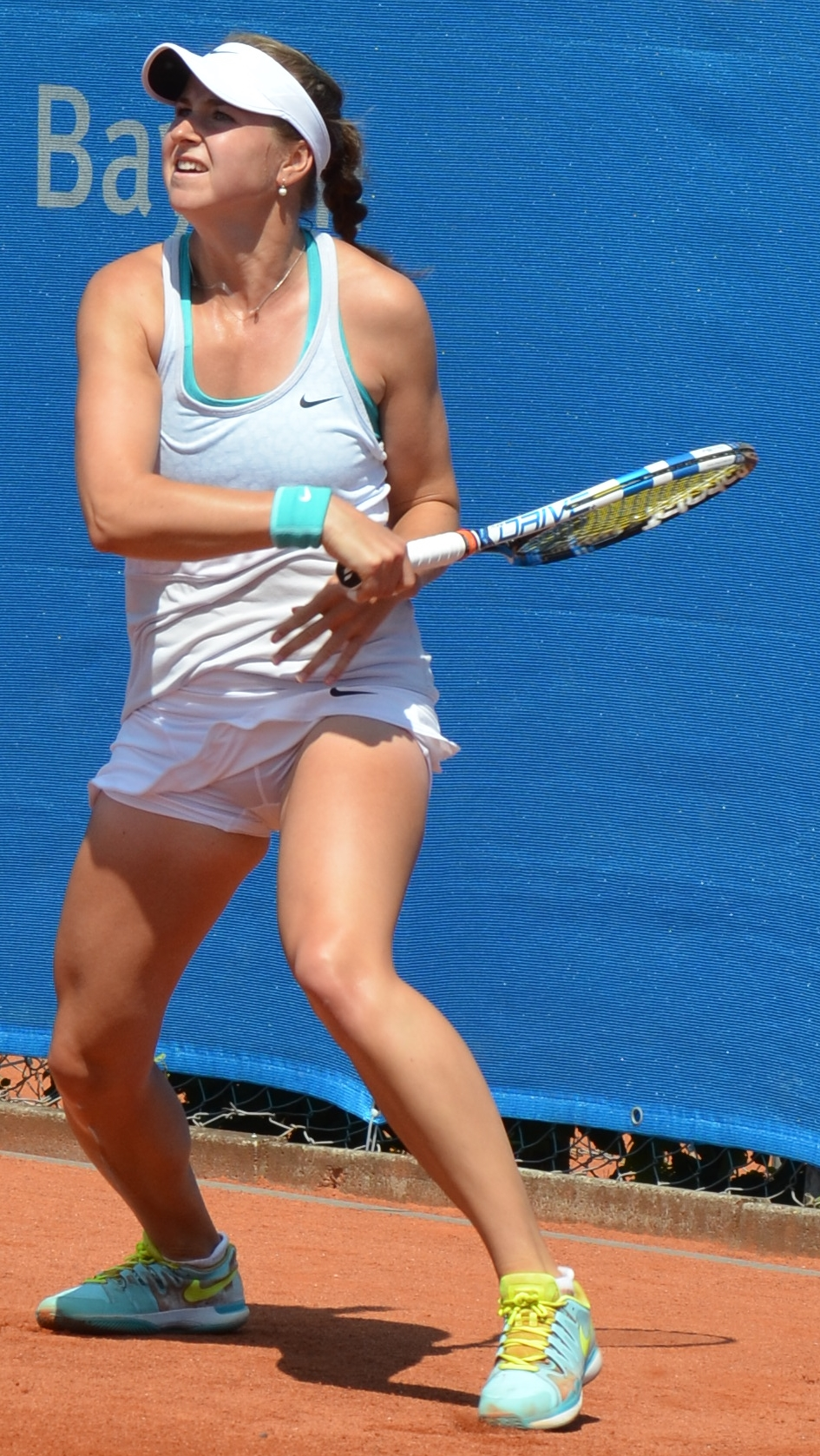
Peterson at the 2015 Nürnberger Versicherungscup

Peterson debuted on the WTA Tour in 2012, where she was handed a wildcard in both singles and doubles at the 2012 Swedish Open. However, she failed in both competition in the first round. In 2013, Peterson also was handed a wildcard for the 2013 Swedish Open, in both singles and doubles, but again failed to reach second round in both competitions.

In 2014 at the Miami Open, Peterson reached the second round after retirement of Mona Barthel during their first-round match, but Ekaterina Makarova was better in second round. This was Rebecca's first appearance at some Premier 5/Premier Mandatory tournament. For the third time in a row, Rebecca got wildcards for both singles and doubles at 2014 Swedish Open, but this time she was successful in doubles. In singles, she lost in round one to Jana Čepelová, but in doubles, together with Johanna Larsson, she won two matches and entered semifinal, in which Andreja Klepač/María Teresa Torró Flor defeated them.

At the 2015 Rio Open, she failed to qualify in singles but in doubles she booked her first WTA Tour final and succeeded to win the title. At 2015 Nürnberger Versicherungscup, she passed qualifying and then lost to Angelique Kerber. At the Swedish Open, this time in doubles her ranking allowed her to enter the main draw; however, she lost in the first round. But she reached quarterfinals in singles as a wildcard player. At the US Open, she played her first qualifying round at a Grand Slam tournament and finished in the second round. At the Guangzhou Open, Peterson reached second round in singles and semifinals in doubles.

In 2016, Peterson had unnotable results, often reaching first or second rounds but failed to get into main draw at all four Grand Slam tournaments. In doubles, she reached the quarterfinals of the Copa Colsanitas and Swedish Open. In 2017, Peterson played at Wimbledon where she was stopped in qualifying. Her first main-draw appearance on WTA Tour came at the Swedish Open where she lost in the first round in singles, but in doubles reached the quarterfinals.

Finally, she made her main-draw debut at a Grand Slam tournament, after qualifying for the 2017 US Open. Then, she reached quarterfinals at the Guanzhou International Open and semifinals at the Taipei Challenger.

=== 2018: Playing on WTA Tour & first semifinal, major third round & top 100 ===
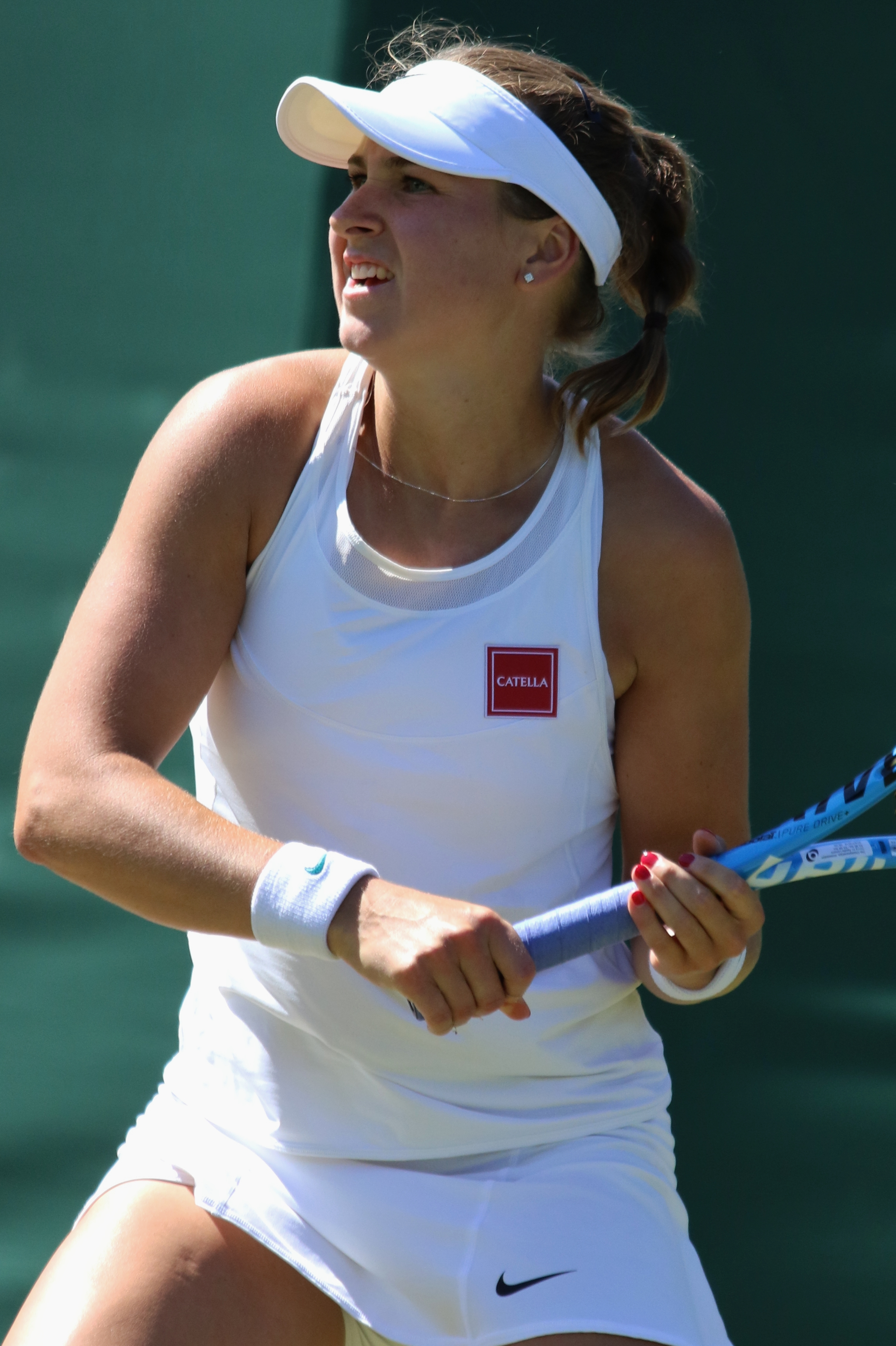
Peterson at the 2018 Wimbledon

Peterson started year as world No. 149, so she was forced to play qualifying for the Australian Open in order to play in main draw but failed in round one, losing to Liu Fangzhou in three sets. Then, she reached second round at the Newport Beach Challenger, as well as quarterfinals at Midland.

She qualified for the Mexican Open and defeated Alizé Cornet, Monica Puig, Zhang Shuai, before losing to Stefanie Vögele in the semifinal. At that time, it was her first significant result, reaching her first singles semifinal on WTA Tour. At the Indian Wells Open, she failed in the first round of qualifying, unlike in Miami, where she lost in the first round of the main draw. In Morocco, she lost in the first round in singles but reached semifinals in doubles. In May, she played at the Open de Cagnes-sur-Mer, where she defeated Dayana Yastremska in the final. This led her directly into the top 100, where she debuted.

At French Open, she won three matches in qualifying, and then defeated Hsieh Su-wei in the first round, recording her first match win at a major but lost to Mihaela Buzărnescu in the second round. At Wimbledon, she also reached the second round. At the Western & Southern Open, she qualified for the main draw and beat Kateřina Siniaková but was not good enough for Elise Mertens in the second round.

At the US Open (as in Wimbledon), she entered without qualifying, and made her first third round at a major event, winning against Anastasia Pavlyuchenkova and Vania King, respectively, before Kaia Kanepi defeated her in round three. Her last tournament of 2018 was the Wuhan Open where she qualified for the main draw. In the first round, she defeated Tímea Babos but then Caroline Wozniacki was better in the second.

=== 2019: Breakthrough into top 50, two WTA Tour singles titles ===
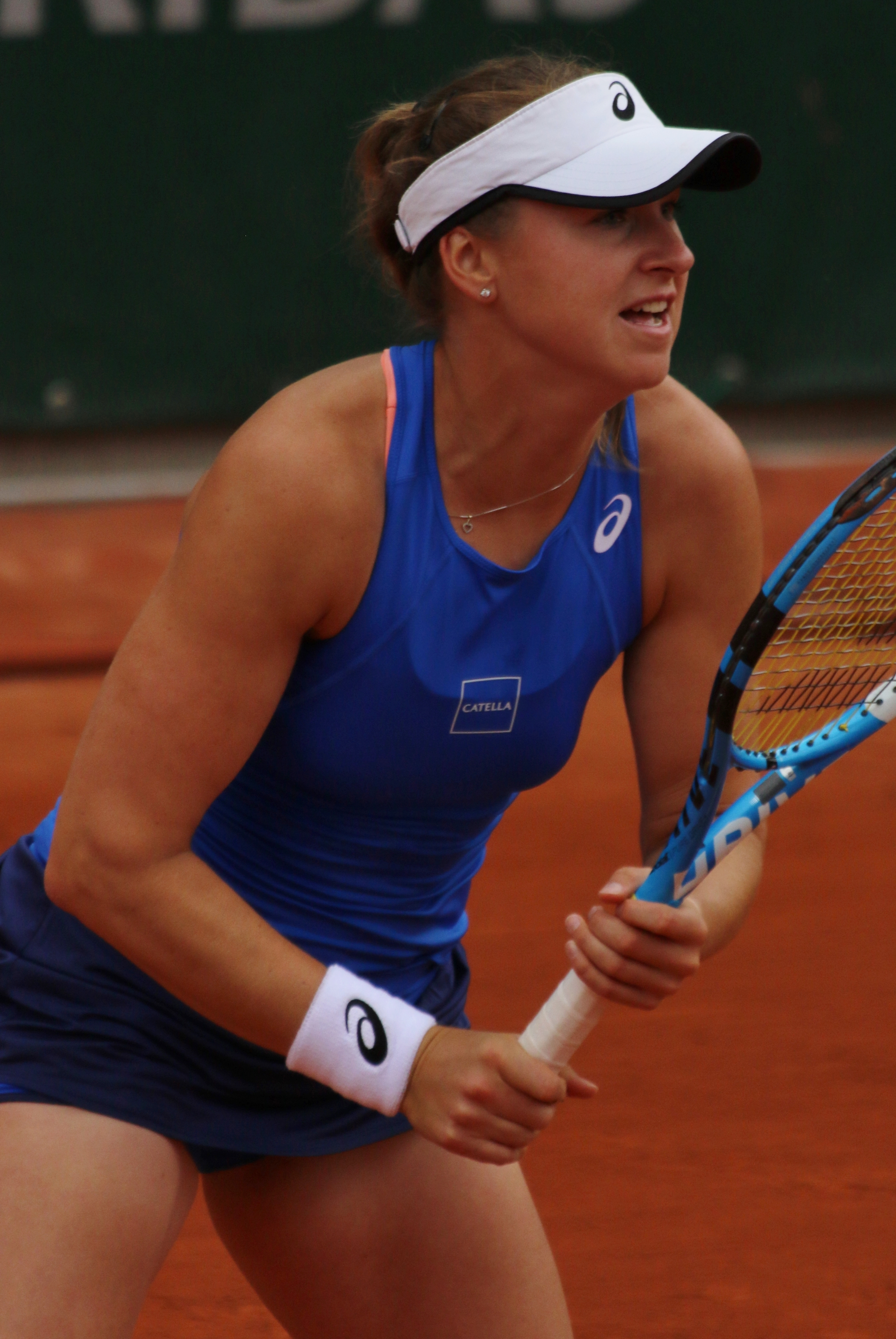
Peterson at the 2019 French Open

In her debut at the Australian Open, she get to the second round, where she lost to Maria Sharapova. At the Newport Beach Challenger, she reached the quarterfinals. She continued with good results, reaching semifinal at the Dow Tennis Classic. In Acapulco, she lost in the first round, so she did at the Indian Wells Open but reached the second round of the Miami Open. In the clay-court season, she reached few second rounds and the quarterfinals at the Morocco Open. At the Italian Open, she passed qualifying and lost in the first round to Serena Williams, while at the French Open, she left tournament in the second round, in both singles and doubles. In the grass-court season, she got to the first round of Mallorca Open, third round of the Eastbourne International and first round in Wimbledon.

At the Washington Open, she upset No. 8 Sloane Stephens, that marked her first top-10 win but then was defeated by Camila Giorgi. Following up, she failed to qualify for the main draw of the Premier 5 Rogers Cup. Her next step was another Premier 5 tournament, the Western & Southern Open, where she passed qualifying and defeated Johanna Konta in first round, then Veronika Kudermetova in order to reach third round of a Premier 5/Premier Mandatory tournament for the first time. No. 3 seed Karolína Plíšková then stopped her from reaching her first Premier 5/Premier Mandatory quarterfinal. At the US Open, she defeated Monica Puig in the first round but lost in the second round to Dayana Yastremska. This was the first year that Rebecca played at all four majors in the main draw.

During the Asian tour Peterson had a breakthrough. At the Jiangxi International Open, she entered into her first singles final, where she defeated Elena Rybakina. At the Wuhan Open, she won two qualifying matches, and then in the main draw, she defeated Camila Giorgi but lost to Petra Martić in the following round. At China Open, she also passed qualifying but was stopped in the first round of the main draw by Simona Halep. Her last tournament of the year was the Tianjin Open, where she won her second career singles title, defeating Heather Watson in the final. On 14 October, she entered the top 50 for the first time in her career.

=== 2020–21: Health problems and limited play due to COVID, loss of form ===
At the 2020 Auckland Open, she was defeated by Tamara Zidanšek. In the first round of the Hobart International against Fiona Ferro, she wasn't able to continue the match at 4–4, due to back problems. During the Australian Open, back injury and illness made things even worse. Rebecca lost in the first round to Polona Hercog. After that she had a one-month break, and then returned at the Monterrey Open. There, she won against two Ukrainian players, Kateryna Kozlova and Kateryna Bondarenko, in the first two rounds, and then lost in the quarterfinal to Arantxa Rus.

A few months of inactivity due to the COVID-19 pandemic helped Peterson rest and cure from her back problems, before she played at the Palermo Ladies Open, the first WTA tournament after tennis returned in August 2020. There she faced Camila Giorgi but did not make it to the second round. At the Cincinnati Open, she lost to Elise Mertens.

At the 2020 US Open, Peterson was seeded at No. 32 for the first time at a Grand Slam tournament. However, she lost in the first round to Kirsten Flipkens. At the İstanbul Cup, she reached quarterfinals, losing there to Patricia Maria Țig. At the Italian Open, she also lost in the first round, this time to Yulia Putintseva.

At the 2020 French Open, again she left the tournament after the first round, losing to Alison Van Uytvanck.

In 2021, despite reaching three WTA semifinals at the Chicago Women's Open in August, the Astana Open in September and the Transylvania Open in October, she finished the year ranked No. 86.

=== 2022: First top-5 win, Swedish Open doubles title ===
Peterson started her 2022 season at the first edition of the Melbourne Summer Set 2 where she lost in the second round to qualifier and eventual finalist, Aliaksandra Sasnovich. Getting past qualifying at the Adelaide International 2, she defeated top seed Aryna Sabalenka in the first round in three sets. She was beaten in the second round by Madison Brengle.

At the Australian Open, Peterson recorded a win over Australian wildcard Daria Saville in the first round. She was eliminated from the tournament in the second round by seventh seed Iga Świątek. At the same tournament, she reached the quarterfinals of a major for the first time in her career, partnering Anastasia Potapova.

Partnering Misaki Doi, Peterson won the doubles title at the WTA 125 Swedish Open. She was runner-up in the singles at the WTA 125 Andorrà Open, losing to Alycia Parks in the final.

=== 2023: First WTA Tour final since 2019 & back to top 100 ===
Ranked No. 140 at the Mérida Open, Peterson reached her second semifinal as a qualifier at a tournament in Mexico, the first was in 2018 at the Abierto Mexicano, defeating Nadia Podoroska, fifth seed Alycia Parks and top seed Magda Linette in straight sets. Next she defeated Caty McNally to reach the final, where she lost to Camila Giorgi.

At Indian Wells, she reached the fourth round defeating Marta Kostyuk 22nd seed Zhang Shuai (due to retirement) and Jil Teichmann, before losing to sixth seed Coco Gauff. It was the first time in her career she had gone as deep at WTA 1000 level. As a result, she moved up in the rankings to world No. 76 on 20 March.

Peterson made it through to the quarterfinals at the Chicago Challenger in August with wins over Diane Parry and Kaia Kanepi. She lost in the last eight to Cristina Bucșa.

== National representation ==
Peterson made her debut for Sweden in 2014 Fed Cup. The team was host, playing against the Thailand in a play-off in order to remain in World Group II in 2015. Peterson first match happened in doubles, together with Hilda Melander, and they succeeded in winning against Tamarine Tanasugarn/Varatchaya Wongteanchai. Swedish team, with score of 4–0, kept their place in World Group II.

In 2015, Swedish team played against Swiss team in the World Group I Play–off for the chance to be promoted into World Group in 2016. Peterson played her first singles match against Timea Bacsinszky, but lost in straight sets. In doubles, together with Johanna Larsson, she won against Viktorija Golubic/Xenia Knoll but Switzerland won with a score of 3–1. So Swedish team was forced to play in the Play-off, in order to stay in World Group II in 2016. They played against Slovakia, and Peterson faced Anna Karolína Schmiedlová, but failed to win. In doubles, together with Susanne Celik, she lost to Jana Čepelová/Schmiedlová. Swedish team finally lost with a 0–4 score.

== Coaches ==
In August 2019, after Wimbledon Championships, Peterson started a collaboration with Swedish star coach Thomas Högstedt, who previously trained, among others, Maria Sharapova. Together with him, Peterson debuted in the top 50, and also won two WTA singles titles. After six months, in February 2020, they split. She is currently coached by her father (Mart Peterson) and Bosse Eriksson.

== Playing style ==
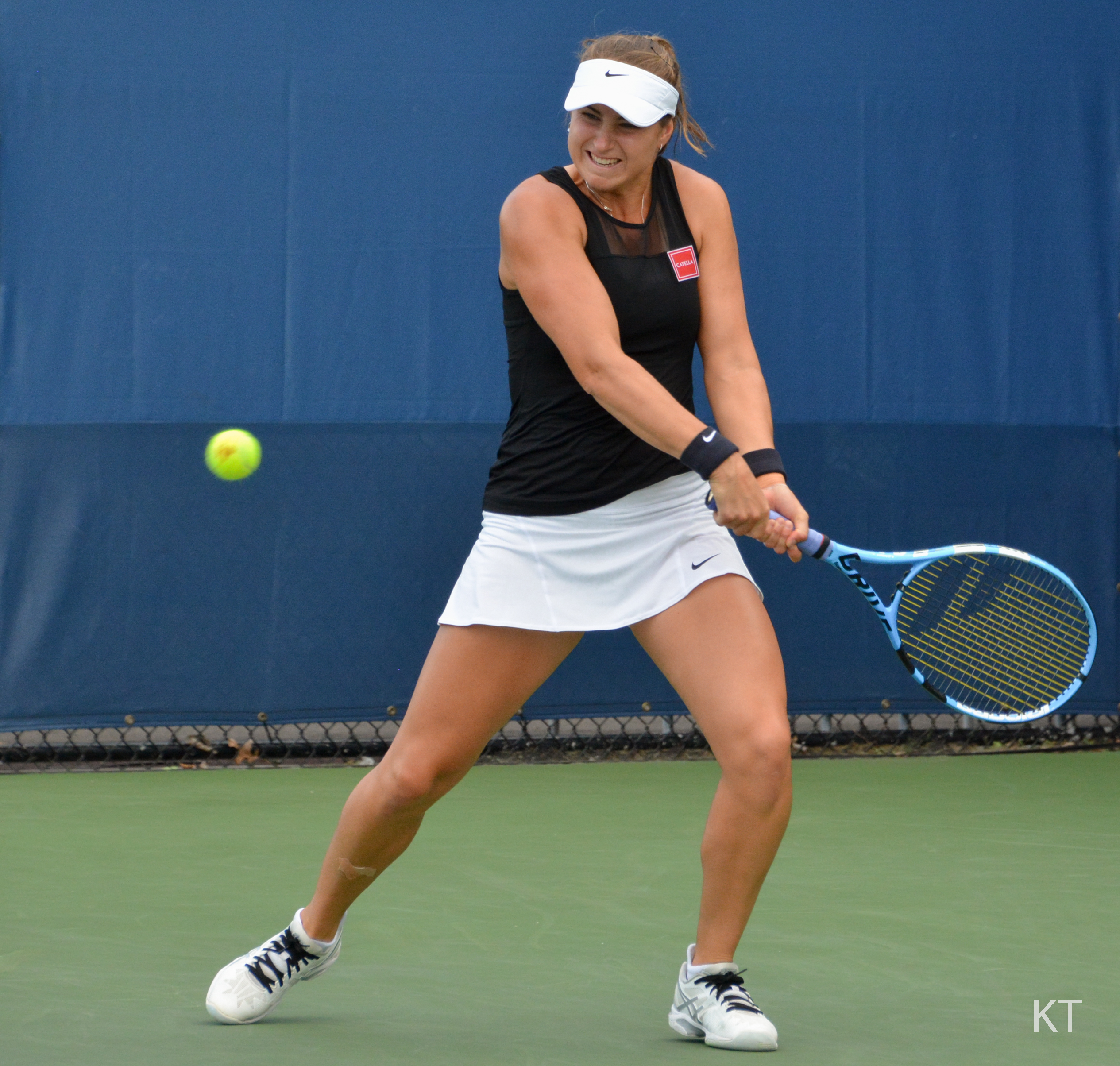
Peterson's backhand

Peterson is one of the most aggressive tennis players on tour. Her most significant shot is forehand, that she also stated in interview with Live Tennis Italy: "My best shot is the forehand and I try to play by always varying the shot and looking for new solutions." In another interview, Peterson's former coach Thomas Högstedt talked about his impression of Peterson: "Rebecca knows a lot about how she feels herself, other big players maybe more just see how they beat the opponent – if you win the first set then you put in extra gear and decide. It is easy to feel after you are nervous or tired, but the best do not think so much about how they themselves feel. They only think about how to mentally crack the opponent. It's something she needs to work on. I think that bit is very important." Speaking about her game, Hogstedt says: "She has an incredibly good forehand, plays a bit like a men's player with quite a lot of topspin... Very serious, incredibly well trained." Her dad, Mart Peterson, who has also been her coach for most of her career, says: "Hogstedt has helped my daughter a lot and made her tougher. It has been a lot of help. She has become tougher against herself and tougher against her opponents."

== Performance timelines ==
Key
W	F	SF	QF	#R	RR	Q#	DNQ	A	NH

(W) winner; (F) finalist; (SF) semifinalist; (QF) quarterfinalist; (#R) rounds 4, 3, 2, 1; (RR) round-robin stage; (Q#) qualification round; (DNQ) did not qualify; (A) absent; (NH) not held; (SR) strike rate (events won / competed); (W–L) win–loss record.
To avoid confusion and double counting, these charts are updated at the conclusion of a tournament or when the player's participation has ended.

Only main-draw results in WTA Tour, Grand Slam tournaments, Billie Jean King Cup, United Cup, Hopman Cup and Olympic Games are included in win–loss records.

=== Singles ===
Current through the 2023 Guadalajara Open.

Tournament	2012	2013	2014	2015	2016	2017	2018	2019	2020	2021	2022	2023	SR	W–L	Win %
Grand Slam tournaments
Australian Open	A	A	A	A	Q1	A	Q1	2R	1R	1R	2R	Q1	0 / 4	2–4	33%
French Open	A	A	A	A	Q1	A	2R	2R	1R	2R	A	2R	0 / 5	4–5	44%
Wimbledon	A	A	A	A	Q3	Q2	2R	1R	NH	1R	1R	1R	0 / 5	1–5	17%
US Open	A	A	A	Q2	Q3	1R	3R	2R	1R	1R	1R	1R	0 / 7	3–7	30%
Win–loss	0–0	0–0	0–0	0–0	0–0	0–1	4–3	3–4	0–3	1–4	1–3	1–3	0 / 21	10–21	32%
National representation
Billie Jean King Cup (Note: Formerly known as Fed Cup until 2020.)	A	A	WG2	WG2	Z1	A	Z1	POZ1	A (Note: Edition is split into the two years due to COVID-19.)		A	PO	0 / 0	8–8	50%
Summer Olympics	A	NH			A	NH				2R	NH		0 / 1	1–1	50%
WTA 1000
Dubai / Qatar Open (Note: The first Premier 5 event of the year has switched back and forth between the Dubai Tennis Championships and the Qatar Ladies Open since 2009. Dubai was classified as a Premier 5 event from 2009 to 2011 before being succeeded by Doha for the 2012–2014 period. In 2015, Dubai regained its Premier 5 status while Doha was demoted to Premier status. The Premier 5 tournaments were reclassified as WTA 1000 tournaments in 2021.)	A	A	A	A	A	A	A	A	A	A	A	A	0 / 0	0–0	0%
Indian Wells Open	A	A	A	A	A	A	Q1	1R	NH	1R	A	4R	0 / 3	3–3	50%
Miami Open	A	A	2R	A	A	A	1R	2R	NH	1R	A	Q1	0 / 4	2–4	33%
Madrid Open	A	A	A	A	A	A	A	A	NH	A	A	A	0 / 0	0–0	0%
Italian Open	A	A	A	A	A	A	A	1R	1R	A	A	A	0 / 2	0–2	0%
Canadian Open	A	A	A	A	A	A	A	Q2	NH	A	Q1	A	0 / 0	0–0	0%
Cincinnati Open	A	A	A	A	A	A	2R	3R	1R	1R	A	A	0 / 4	3–4	43%
Guadalajara Open	NH										A	A	0 / 0	0–0	–
Wuhan Open	A	A	A	A	A	A	2R	2R	NH				0 / 2	2–2	50%
China Open	A	A	A	A	A	A	A	1R	NH			A	0 / 1	0–1	0%
Win–loss	0–0	0–0	1–1	0–0	0–0	0–0	2–3	4–6	0–2	0–3	0–0	3–1	0 / 16	10–16	38%
Career statistics
	2012	2013	2014	2015	2016	2017	2018	2019	2020	2021	2022	2023	SR	W–L	Win %
Tournaments	1	1	2	4	6	3	11	20	10	18	14	7	Career total: 97		
Titles	0	0	0	0	0	0	0	2	0	0	0	0	Career total: 2		
Finals	0	0	0	0	0	0	0	2	0	0	0	1	Career total: 3		
Overall win–loss	0–1	0–1	1–2	3–6	4–8	2–3	13–12	26–20	3–10	18–18	7–14	11–8	2 / 97	88–103	46%
Year-end ranking (Note: 2011: WTA ranking–1209.)	–	440	185	138	137	196	55	43	55	86	144		$3,001,263		

=== Doubles ===
Current through the 2023 US Open.

Tournament	2012	2013	2014	2015	2016	2017	2018	2019	2020	2021	2022	2023	SR	W–L	Win %
Grand Slam tournaments
Australian Open	A	A	A	A	A	A	A	1R	A	1R	QF	A	0 / 3	3–3	50%
French Open	A	A	A	A	A	A	A	2R	1R	1R	A	A	0 / 3	1–3	25%
Wimbledon	A	A	A	A	A	A	Q1	2R	NH	A	A	1R	0 / 2	1–2	33%
US Open	A	A	A	A	A	A	1R	1R	A	2R	2R	A	0 / 4	2–4	33%
Win–loss	0–0	0–0	0–0	0–0	0–0	0–0	0–1	2–4	0–1	1–3	4–2	0–1	0 / 12	7–12	37%
National representation
Billie Jean King Cup	A	A	WG2	WG2	Z1	A	Z1	POZ1	A		A	PO	0 / 0	4–3	57%
Career statistics
Tournaments	1	1	1	4	4	1	2	6	1	7	6	1	Career total: 35		
Titles	0	0	0	1	0	0	0	0	0	0	0	0	Career total: 1		
Finals	0	0	0	1	0	0	0	0	0	0	0	0	Career total: 1		
Overall win–loss	0–1	0–1	3–1	6–4	2–5	1–1	2–3	4–6	0–1	1–7	6–5	0–1	1 / 35	25–36	41%
Year–end ranking	n/a	707	210	105	196	368	308	261	292	393	88				

== WTA Tour finals ==
=== Singles: 3 (2 titles, 1 runner-up) ===
Legend Grand Slam WTA 1000 WTA 500 WTA 250 (2–1)	Finals by surface Hard (2–1) Grass (0–0) Clay (0–0) Carpet (0–0)

Result	W–L	Date	Tournament	Tier	Surface	Opponent	Score
Win	1–0	Sep 2019	Jiangxi Open, China	International (Note: The WTA International tournaments were reclassified as WTA 250 tournaments in 2021.)	Hard	(Kazakhstan) Elena Rybakina	6–2, 6–0
Win	2–0	Oct 2019	Tianjin Open, China	International	Hard	(United Kingdom) Heather Watson	6–4, 6–4
Loss	2–1	Feb 2023	Mérida Open, Mexico	WTA 250	Hard	(Italy) Camila Giorgi	6–7^{(3–7)}, 6–1, 2–6

=== Doubles: 1 (title) ===
Legend Grand Slam WTA 1000 WTA 500 WTA 250 (1–0)	Finals by surface Hard (0–0) Clay (1–0) Grass (0–0) Carpet (0–0)

Result	W–L	Date	Tournament	Tier	Surface	Partner	Opponents	Score
Win	1–0	Feb 2015	Rio Open, Brazil	International	Clay	(Belgium) Ysaline Bonaventure	(Romania) Irina-Camelia Begu (Argentina) María Irigoyen	3–0 ret.

== WTA Challenger finals ==
=== Singles: 1 (runner-up) ===
Result	W–L	Date	Tournament	Surface	Opponent	Score
Loss	0–1	Dec 2022	Andorrà Open, Andorra	Hard (i)	(United States) Alycia Parks	1–6, 4–6

=== Doubles: 2 (1 title, 1 runner-up) ===
Result	W–L	Date	Tournament	Surface	Partner	Opponents	Score
Loss	0–1	Jan 2018	Newport Beach Challenger, United States	Hard	(United States) Jamie Loeb	(Japan) Misaki Doi (Switzerland) Jil Teichmann	6–7^{(4–7)}, 6–1, [8–10]
Win	1–1	Jul 2022	Båstad Open, Sweden	Clay	(Japan) Misaki Doi	(Romania) Mihaela Buzărnescu (Russia) Irina Khromacheva	w/o

== ITF Circuit finals ==
=== Singles: 17 (12 titles, 5 runner–ups) ===
Legend $100,000 tournaments (1–0) $50/60,000 tournaments (3–2) $25,000 tournaments (5–2) $10,000 tournaments (3–1)	Finals by surface Hard (7–4) Clay (5–1)

Result	W–L	Date	Tournament	Tier	Surface	Opponent	Score
Win	1–0	May 2013	ITF Båstad, Sweden	10,000	Clay	(Slovakia) Zuzana Luknárová	6–3, 6–2
Win	2–0	Oct 2013	ITF Stockholm, Sweden	10,000	Hard (i)	(Germany) Tayisiya Morderger	7–6^{(7–2)}, 6–2
Win	3–0	Nov 2013	ITF Stockholm, Sweden	10,000	Hard (i)	(Slovakia) Zuzana Luknárová	6–7^{(4–7)}, 6–2, 6–4
Win	4–0	Dec 2013	ITF Mérida, Mexico	25,000	Hard	(Netherlands) Indy de Vroome	7–5, 4–6, 6–3
Win	5–0	Dec 2013	ITF Mérida, Mexico	25,000	Hard	(Venezuela) Adriana Pérez	6–4, 6–0
Loss	5–1	Feb 2014	ITF Helsingborg, Sweden	10,000	Hard (i)	(Bosnia and Herzegovina) Jasmina Tinjić	1–6, 0–6
Win	6–1	Oct 2014	ITF Perth, Australia	25,000	Hard	(Japan) Hiroko Kuwata	6–3, 6–0
Loss	6–2	Nov 2014	ITF Margaret River, Australia	25,000	Hard	(Croatia) Tereza Mrdeža	3–6, 3–6
Loss	6–3	May 2015	Maribor Open, Slovenia	25,000	Clay	(Greece) Maria Sakkari	6–3, 2–6, 2–6
Win	7–3	Jun 2015	ITF Ystad, Sweden	25,000	Clay	(France) Mathilde Johansson	6–2, 6–1
Win	8–3	Nov 2015	Tennis Classic of Macon, United States	50,000	Hard	(United States) Anna Tatishvili	6–3, 4–6, 6–1
Win	9–3	Apr 2016	Dothan Pro Classic, United States	50,000	Clay	(United States) Taylor Townsend	6–4, 6–2
Win	10–3	Jun 2017	ITF Padua, Italy	25,000	Clay	(Ukraine) Anastasiya Vasylyeva	5–7, 6–1, 6–4
Win	11–3	May 2018	Open de Cagnes-sur-Mer, France	100,000	Clay	(Ukraine) Dayana Yastremska	6–4, 7–5
Win	12–3	Oct 2021	Rancho Santa Fe Open, United States	60,000	Hard	(United States) Elvina Kalieva	6–4, 6–0
Loss	12–4	Nov 2022	Meitar Open, Israel	60,000	Hard	Mirra Andreeva	1–6, 4–6
Loss	12–5	Feb 2023	ITF Orlando Pro, United States	60,000	Hard	(Australia) Kimberly Birrell	3–6, 0–6

=== Doubles: 11 (6 titles, 5 runner–ups) ===
Legend $80,000 tournaments (0–1) $50,000 tournaments (1–1) $25,000 tournaments (3–2) $10,000 tournaments (2–1)	Finals by surface Hard (3–3) Clay (3–2)

Result	W–L	Date	Tournament	Tier	Surface	Partner	Opponents	Score
Win	1–0	Mar 2013	ITF Sharm El Sheikh, Egypt	10,000	Hard	(Sweden) Malin Ulvefeldt	(Russia) Alina Mikheeva (Canada) Jillian O'Neill	6–3, 6–4
Loss	1–1	May 2013	ITF Båstad, Sweden	10,000	Clay	(Sweden) Malin Ulvefeldt	(Sweden) Ellen Allgurin (Sweden) Beatrice Cedermark	3–6, 0–6
Win	2–1	May 2013	ITF Ra'anana, Israel	10,000	Hard	(Israel) Lee Or	(Israel) Saray Sterenbach (Israel) Ekaterina Tour	6–1, 6–2
Loss	2–2	Dec 2013	ITF Mérida, Mexico	25,000	Hard	(Sweden) Hilda Melander	(United States) Hsu Chieh-yu (Argentina) María Irigoyen	4–6, 7–5, [6–10]
Loss	2–3	Aug 2014	ITF Bad Saulgau, Germany	25.000	Clay	(Sweden) Hilda Melander	(Romania) Diana Buzean (Spain) Arabela Fernández Rabener	5–7, 3–6
Win	3–3	Sep 2014	ITF Alphen aan den Rijn, Netherlands	25,000	Clay	(Netherlands) Eva Wacanno	(Netherlands) Richèl Hogenkamp (Netherlands) Lesley Kerkhove	6–4, 6–4
Win	4–3	Mar 2015	ITF Curitiba, Brazil	25,000	Clay	(Belgium) Ysaline Bonaventure	(Spain) Beatriz García Vidagany (Argentina) Florencia Molinero	4–6, 6–3, [10–5]
Win	5–3	Aug 2015	ITF Plzeň, Czech Republic	25,000	Clay	(Czech Republic) Barbora Krejčíková	(Czech Republic) Lenka Kunčíková (Czech Republic) Karolína Stuchlá	6–4, 6–3
Loss	5–4	Nov 2015	Waco Showdown, United States	50,000	Hard	(Israel) Julia Glushko	(United States) Nicole Gibbs (United States) Vania King	4–6, 4–6
Win	6–4	Nov 2015	Scottsdale Challenge, US	50,000	Hard	(Israel) Julia Glushko	(Switzerland) Viktorija Golubic (Liechtenstein) Stephanie Vogt	4–6, 7–5, [10–6]
Loss	6–5	Nov 2017	Tyler Pro Challenge, US	80,000	Hard	(United States) Jamie Loeb	(United States) Jessica Pegula (United States) Taylor Townsend	4–6, 1–6

== Head-to-head records ==
=== Record against top 10 players ===
Peterson's record against players who have been ranked in the top 10. Active players are in boldface.

Player	Record	Win%	Hard	Clay	Grass	Last match
**Number 1 ranked players**						
**(United States) Venus Williams**	1–0	100%	1–0	–	–	Won (6–3, 4–6, 6–3) at 2019 Tianjin
**(Czech Republic) Karolína Plíšková**	0–1	0%	0–1	–	–	Lost (5–7, 4–6) at 2019 Cincinnati
(Denmark) Caroline Wozniacki	0–1	0%	0–1	–	–	Lost (4–6, 1–6) at 2018 Wuhan
**(Japan) Naomi Osaka**	0–1	0%	0–1	–	–	Lost (6–4, 3–6, 4–6) at 2015 ITF Hong Kong
(Serbia) Jelena Janković	0–1	0%	0–1	–	–	Lost (1–6, 0–1) at 2016 Guangzhou
(Russia) Maria Sharapova	0–1	0%	0–1	–	–	Lost (2–6, 1–6) at 2019 Australian Open
**(Germany) Angelique Kerber**	0–2	0%	–	0–1	0–1	Lost (6–7, 0–6) at 2019 Eastbourne
(United States) Serena Williams	0–2	0%	0–1	0–1	–	Lost (4–6, 2–6) at 2019 Rome
**(Poland) Iga Świątek**	0–3	0%	0–2	0–1	–	Lost (0–6, 1–6) at 2023 US Open
**(Romania) Simona Halep**	0–2	0%	0–1	0–1	–	Lost (1–6, 1–6) at 2019 Beijing
Number 2 ranked players						
**(Belarus) Aryna Sabalenka**	1–0	100%	1–0	–	–	Won (5–7, 6–1, 7–5) at 2022 Adelaide
**(Tunisia) Ons Jabeur**	2–1	67%	1–0	1–0	0–1	Lost (2–6, 1–6) at 2021 Wimbledon
**(Spain) Paula Badosa**	0–1	0%	–	0–1	–	Lost (2–6, 4–6) at 2021 Belgrade
**(Estonia) Anett Kontaveit**	0–4	0%	0–3	0–1	–	Lost (3–6, 2–6) at 2022 Hamburg
Number 3 ranked players						
**(United States) Sloane Stephens**	1–0	100%	1–0	–	–	Won (6–2, 7–5) at 2019 Washington
**(Ukraine) Elina Svitolina**	0–1	0%	0–1	–	–	Lost (1–6, 7–6, 3–6) at 2021 Chicago
**(Greece) Maria Sakkari**	0–1	0%	–	0–1	–	Lost (6–3, 2–6, 2–6) at 2015 ITF Maribor
Number 4 ranked players						
(Australia) Samantha Stosur	1–0	100%	–	1–0	–	Won (7–5, 7–5) at 2019 Rome
(United Kingdom) Johanna Konta	1–0	100%	1–0	–	–	Won (6–3, 3–6, 7–5) at 2019 Cincinnati
**(United States) Sofia Kenin**	1–1	50%	1–1	–	–	Lost (3–4 ret.) at 2019 Acapulco
(Netherlands) Kiki Bertens	0–1	0%	0–1	–	–	Lost (4–6, 4–6) at 2016 Auckland
**(France) Caroline Garcia**	0–1	0%	–	0–1	–	Lost (2–6, 3–6) at 2019 Strasbourg
**(Switzerland) Belinda Bencic**	0–1	0%	–	–	0–1	Lost (5–7, 4–6) at 2019 Mallorca
Number 5 ranked players						
**(Canada) Eugenie Bouchard**	1–0	100%	1–0	–	–	Won (6–4, 6–3) at 2018 Miami
**(United States) Jessica Pegula**	2–1	67%	1–1	1–0	–	Lost (3–6, 3–6) at 2019 Newport Beach
Number 7 ranked players						
**(United States) Danielle Collins**	1–2	33%	0–2	–	1–0	Lost (1–6, 2–6) at 2021 Melbourne
Number 8 ranked players						
**(United States) Coco Gauff**	1–0	100%	1–0	–	–	Won (6–2, 6–1) at 2019 ITF Midland
(Russia) Ekaterina Makarova	0–1	0%	0–1	–	–	Lost (1–6, 1–6) at 2014 Miami
Number 9 ranked players						
(Germany) Andrea Petkovic	0–1	0%	0–1	–	–	Lost (6–7, 2–6) at 2022 St. Petersburg
(Switzerland) Timea Bacsinszky	0–1	0%	0–1	–	–	Lost (6–7, 0–6) at 2015 Fed Cup
**Total**	**13–32**	**29%**	**9–21 (31%)**	**3–8 (27%)**	**1–3 (25%)**	**current as of 28 August 2023**

== Top 10 wins ==
Season	2019	...	2022	Total
Wins	1		1	2

#	Player	Rank	Event	Surface	Rd	Score	RPR
2019
1.	(United States) Sloane Stephens	No. 8	Washington Open, United States	Hard	1R	6–2, 7–5	No. 70
2022
2.	(Belarus) Aryna Sabalenka	No. 2	Adelaide International, Australia	Hard	1R	5–7, 6–1, 7–5	No. 93
