= Samantha Crawford =

American tennis player (born 1995)

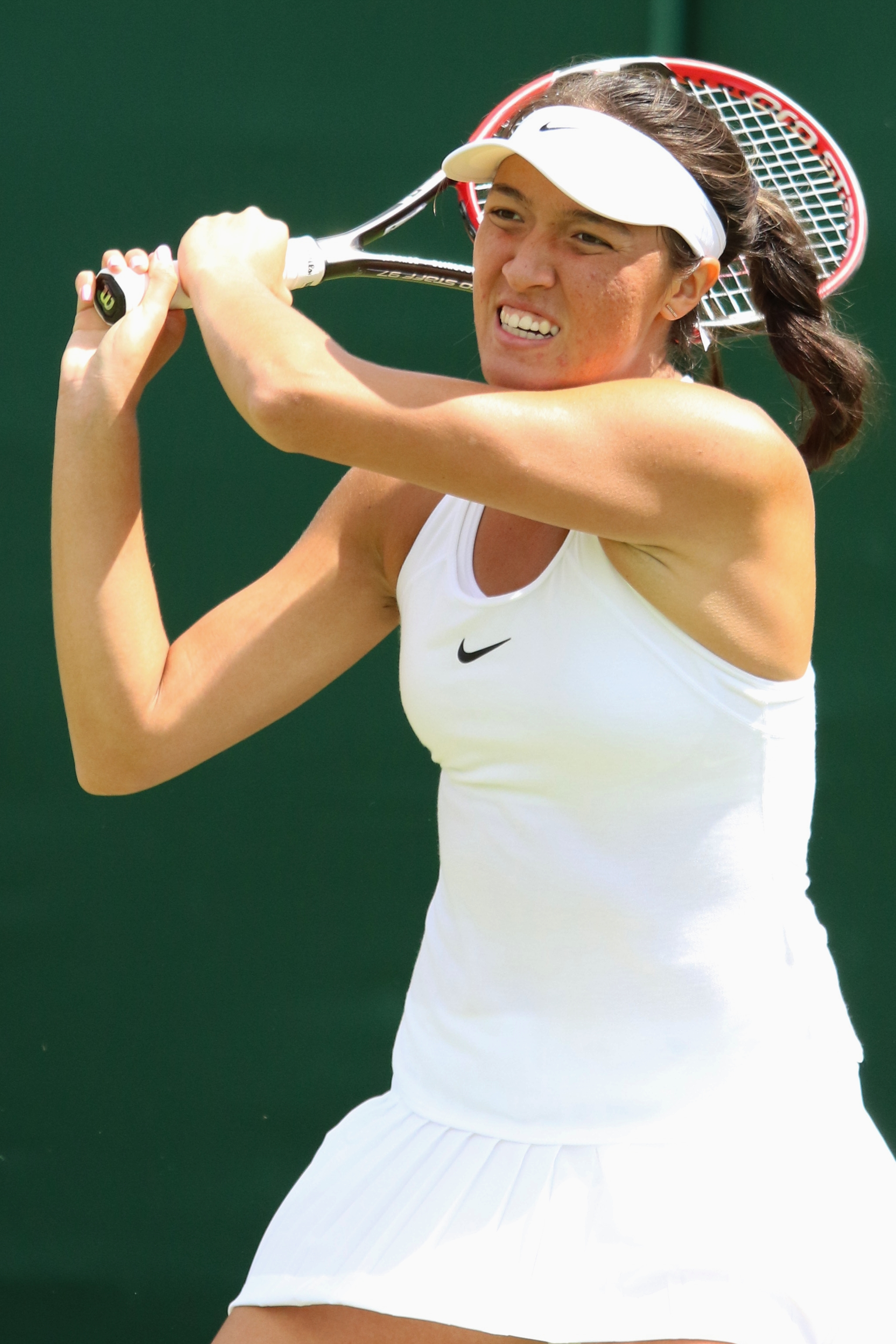
- Crawford at the 2016 Wimbledon Championships
- Country (sports): United States
- Born: February 18, 1995 (age 31) Atlanta, Georgia
- Height: 1.88 m (6 ft 2 in)
- Prize money: $573,320

Singles
- Career record: 145–131
- Career titles: 1 ITF
- Highest ranking: No. 98 (July 11, 2016)

Grand Slam singles results
- Australian Open: 2R (2017)
- French Open: 1R (2016)
- Wimbledon: 2R (2016)
- US Open: 1R (2012, 2015, 2016)

Doubles
- Career record: 66–57
- Career titles: 5 ITF
- Highest ranking: No. 216 (July 13, 2015)

Grand Slam doubles results
- US Open: 1R (2011, 2012, 2014, 2016)

Samantha Crawford (born February 18, 1995) is an American former professional tennis player.

In her career, Crawford won one singles title and five doubles titles on the ITF Women's Circuit. On July 11, 2016, she reached her best singles ranking of world No. 98, with her WTA doubles rankings peak of No. 216 being achieved on July 13, 2015.

As a junior, Crawford won the girls' singles title at the 2012 US Open, defeating Anett Kontaveit in the final.

== Career ==
Aged 17, Crawford advanced through qualifying to make her major main-draw debut at the 2012 US Open, losing to fellow teenager Laura Robson in the first round.

Having seen her career stalled by a knee injury that required surgery in 2013, she earned a place at the 2015 US Open by winning the USTA's Wild Card Challenge. Again she lost in the first round, this time to Irina Falconi.

In November 2015, Crawford won what would prove to be her only ITF singles title at the Scottsdale Challenge, defeating Viktorija Golubic in the final and in the process clinching the USTA Australian Open Wild Card Challenge.

As a qualifier at the 2016 Brisbane International, Crawford achieved her career-best WTA Tour result defeating wildcard entrant Priscilla Hon, seventh seed Belinda Bencic and Andrea Petkovic to reach the semifinals, at which point she lost to former world No. 1 and eventual champion Victoria Azarenka.

She made her first appearance at a major on foreign soil at the 2016 Australian Open, losing to Danka Kovinić in the first round.

Thanks to her improved world ranking, Crawford gained direct entry into the main-draws at the 2016 French Open, where she lost in the first round to Tímea Babos, and that year's Wimbledon, where she defeated qualifier Paula Kania to set up a second round meeting with 28th seed Lucie Šafářová which she lost in straight sets. She also made it directly into the 2016 US Open, but lost in the first round to 24th seed Belinda Bencic in three sets.

Crawford made her final major main-draw appearance at the 2017 Australian Open, overcoming fellow American Lauren Davis in her opening match, before being eliminated in the second round by seventh seed Garbiñe Muguruza.

In August 2023, Crawford was appointed as an assistant tennis coach at Oklahoma State University.

== ITF finals ==
=== Singles: 6 (1 title, 5 runner-ups) ===
Legend $50,000 tournaments $25,000 tournaments $15,000 tournaments	Finals by surface Hard (1–2) Clay (0–3)

Result	W–L	Date	Tournament	Tier	Surface	Opponent	Score
Loss	0–1	Jul 2012	ITF Yakima, United States	50,000	Hard	(United States) Shelby Rogers	4–6, 7–6^{(3)}, 3–6
Loss	0–2	Jan 2015	ITF Plantation, United States	25,000	Clay	(United States) Sachia Vickery	3–6, 1–6
Loss	0–3	May 2015	ITF Raleigh, United States	25,000	Clay	(United States) Julia Boserup	3–6, 2–6
Loss	0–4	Aug 2015	Lexington Challenger, United States	50,000	Hard	(Japan) Nao Hibino	2–6, 1–6
Win	1–4	Nov 2015	Scottsdale Challenge, United States	50,000	Hard	(Switzerland) Viktorija Golubic	6–3, 4–6, 6–2
Loss	1–5	Mar 2022	ITF Naples, United States	15,000	Clay	(United States) Madison Sieg	2–6, 0–1 ret.

=== Doubles: 8 (5 titles, 3 runner-ups) ===
Legend $50,000 tournaments $25,000 tournaments	Finals by surface Hard (5–3)

Result	W–L	Date	Tournament	Tier	Surface	Partner	Opponents	Score
Win	1–0	Jul 2012	ITF Yakima, US	50,000	Hard	(United States) Madison Keys	(China) Xu Yifan (China) Zhou Yimiao	6–3, 2–6, [12–10]
Win	2–0	Feb 2013	ITF Surprise, US	25,000	Hard	(United States) Sachia Vickery	(United States) Emily Harman (China) Xu Yifan	6–3, 3–6, [10–7]
Win	3–0	Feb 2014	Rancho Santa Fe Open, US	25,000	Hard	(China) Xu Yifan	(United States) Danielle Lao (United States) Keri Wong	3–6, 6–2, [12–10]
Loss	3–1	Jul 2014	Carson Challenger, US	50,000	Hard	(United States) Sachia Vickery	(Netherlands) Michaëlla Krajicek (Australia) Olivia Rogowska	6–7^{(4)}, 1–6
Win	4–1	Feb 2015	Rancho Santa Fe Open, US	25,000	Hard	(United States) Asia Muhammad	(Turkey) İpek Soylu (Serbia) Nina Stojanović	6–0, 6–3
Win	5–1	Jun 2015	ITF Baton Rouge, US	25,000	Hard	(United States) Emily Harman	(Australia) Storm Sanders (South Africa) Chanel Simmonds	7–6^{(4)}, 6–1
Loss	5–2	Nov 2016	Scottsdale Challenge, US	50,000	Hard	(United States) Melanie Oudin	(United States) Ingrid Neel (United States) Taylor Townsend	4–6, 3–6
Loss	5–3	Oct 2022	ITF Florence, US	25,000	Hard	(United States) Clervie Ngounoue	(United States) Allura Zamarripa (United States) Maribella Zamarripa	3–6, 4–6

== Junior finals ==
=== Grand Slam tournaments ===
==== Girls' singles: 1 (title) ====
Result	Year	Tournament	Surface	Opponent	Score
Win	2012	US Open	Hard	(Estonia) Anett Kontaveit	7–5, 6–3
