= 2012 Audi Melbourne Pro Tennis Classic =

- Date: 30 April – 6 May
- Edition: 7th
- Surface: Clay
- Location: Indian Harbour Beach, Florida, United States

Champions

Singles
- (United States) Grace Min

Doubles
- (Brazil) Maria Fernanda Alves / (Australia) Jessica Moore
← 2011 ·	Audi Melbourne Pro Tennis Classic	· 2013 →

The 2012 Audi Melbourne Pro Tennis Classic was a professional tennis tournament played on clay courts. It was the seventh edition of the tournament which was part of the 2012 ITF Women's Circuit. It took place in Indian Harbour Beach, Florida, United States between 30 April and 6 May 2012.

== WTA entrants ==
=== Seeds ===
Country	Player	Rank^{1}	Seed
USA	Irina Falconi	104	1
AUS	Olivia Rogowska	121	2
USA	Alison Riske	128	3
ITA	Camila Giorgi	129	4
POR	Michelle Larcher de Brito	143	5
USA	Julia Cohen	147	6
USA	Coco Vandeweghe	163	1
USA	Madison Brengle	183	2

- ^{1} Rankings are as of April 23, 2012.

=== Other entrants ===
The following players received wildcards into the singles main draw:

- (United States) Jan Abaza
- (United States) Alexandra Kiick
- (United States) Maria Sanchez
- (United States) Chalena Scholl

The following players received entry from the qualifying draw:

- (United States) Krista Hardebeck
- (United States) Lena Litvak
- (Russia) Valeria Solovieva
- (Ukraine) Alyona Sotnikova

The following players received entry by a lucky loser spot:

- (United States) Shelby Rogers

The following players received entry by a Special Exempt:

- (United States) Melanie Oudin

== Champions ==
=== Singles ===
- (United States) Grace Min def. (United States) Maria Sanchez, 6–4, 7–6^{(7–4)}

=== Doubles ===
- (Brazil) Maria Fernanda Alves / (Australia) Jessica Moore def. (Canada) Marie-Ève Pelletier / (Ukraine) Alyona Sotnikova, 6–7^{(6–8)}, 6–3, [10–8]
