= 2012 Colorado International =

- Date: July 2–8
- Edition: 1st
- Surface: Hard – Outdoor
- Location: Denver, United States

Champions

Singles
- (United States) Nicole Gibbs

Doubles
- (Canada) Marie-Ève Pelletier / (United States) Shelby Rogers
Colorado International

The 2012 Colorado International was a professional tennis tournament played on outdoor hard courts. It was the 1st edition of the tournament and was part of the 2012 ITF Women's Circuit. It took place in Denver, United States between 2 and 8 July 2012.

== WTA entrants ==
=== Seeds ===
Country	Player	Rank^{1}	Seed
POR	Michelle Larcher de Brito	150	1
USA	Alexa Glatch	154	2
USA	Madison Brengle	167	3
FRA	Victoria Larrière	182	4
CAN	Sharon Fichman	197	5
CHN	Zheng Saisai	213	6
USA	Maria Sanchez	225	7
RSA	Chanel Simmonds	227	8

- Rankings are as of June 25, 2012.

=== Other entrants ===
The following players received wildcards into the singles main draw:

- (Russia) Vasilisa Bardina

The following players received entry from the qualifying draw:

- (United States) Jan Abaza
- (United States) Nicole Gibbs
- (Japan) Mayo Hibi
- (United States) Tori Kinard

The following players received entry by a Special Ranking:

- (China) Zhou Yimiao

== Champions ==
=== Singles ===
- (United States) Nicole Gibbs def. (France) Julie Coin, 6–2, 3–6, 6–4

=== Doubles ===
- (Canada) Marie-Ève Pelletier / (United States) Shelby Rogers def. (United States) Lauren Embree / (United States) Nicole Gibbs, 6–3, 3–6, [12–10]
