= 2012 Audi Melbourne Pro Tennis Classic – Singles =

Singles
- 2012 Audi Melbourne Pro Tennis Classic

Final
- Champion: (United States) Grace Min
- Runner-up: (United States) Maria Sanchez
- Score: 6–4, 7–6^{(7–4)}

Events
Singles	Doubles
← 2011 ·	Audi Melbourne Pro Tennis Classic	· 2013 →

Melinda Czink was the defending champion, but chose to participate in Budapest instead.

Grace Min won the title, defeating Maria Sanchez in the final, 6–4, 7–6^{(7–4)}.

== Seeds ==
1. (United States) Irina Falconi (first round)
2. (Australia) Olivia Rogowska (first round)
3. (United States) Alison Riske (first round)
4. (Italy) Camila Giorgi (first round)
5. (Portugal) Michelle Larcher de Brito (second round)
6. (United States) Julia Cohen (first round)
7. (United States) Coco Vandeweghe (second round)
8. (United States) Madison Brengle (first round)

== Main draw ==
=== Key ===
- Q = Qualifier
- WC = Wild card
- LL = Lucky loser
- Alt = Alternate
- SE = Special exempt
- PR = Protected ranking
- ITF = ITF entry
- JE = Junior exempt
- w/o = Walkover
- r = Retired
- d = Defaulted
- SR = Special ranking

=== Finals ===
Semifinals
(United States) Grace Min	2	7	6
Q	(United States) Krista Hardebeck	6	5	1
(United States) Lauren Davis	4	0
WC	(United States) Maria Sanchez	6	6

Final
(United States) Grace Min	6	7^{7}
WC	(United States) Maria Sanchez	4	6^{4}

=== Top half ===
First round
1	(United States) I Falconi	0	4
(United States) G Min	6	6
LL	(United States) S Rogers	6	3	6
(Puerto Rico) M Puig	4	6	3
WC	(United States) A Kiick	6	6
(Israel) J Glushko	3	0
(Belgium) T Hendler	6	4	6
8	(United States) M Brengle	4	6	4
3	(United States) A Riske	2	4
Q	(United States) K Hardebeck	6	6
(Australia) I Holland	2	2
Q	(Ukraine) A Sotnikova	6	6
(United States) Chi Scholl	6	6
WC	(United States) Cha Scholl	3	2
SE	(United States) M Oudin	6	6
6	(United States) J Cohen	3	4

Second round
(United States) G Min	6	6
LL	(United States) S Rogers	4	0
WC	(United States) A Kiick	6	6
(Belgium) T Hendler	1	2
Q	(United States) K Hardebeck	7	6
Q	(Ukraine) A Sotnikova	5	2
(United States) Chi Scholl	6	6
SE	(United States) M Oudin	0	2

Quarterfinals
(United States) G Min	6	6
WC	(United States) A Kiick	2	4
Q	(United States) K Hardebeck	6	6
(United States) Chi Scholl	3	2

Semifinals
(United States) G Min	2	7	6
Q	(United States) K Hardebeck	6	5	1

=== Bottom half ===
First round
5	(Portugal) M Larcher de Brito	6	6
Q	(Russia) V Solovieva	4	4
(Canada) M-È Pelletier	6	7
(United States) A Weinhold	0	5
WC	(United States) J Abaza	4	7^{7}	7^{8}
Q	(United States) L Litvak	6	6^{2}	6^{6}
(United States) L Davis	2	6	6
4	(Italy) C Giorgi	6	4	4
7	(United States) C Vandeweghe	6	6
(Japan) A Omae	2	2
(Canada) S Fichman	4	3
WC	(United States) M Sanchez	6	6
(United States) G Brodsky	7^{7}	3	4
(Canada) H El Tabakh	6^{3}	6	6
(Brazil) R Vaisemberg	6	1	6
2	(Australia) O Rogowska	3	6	1

Second round
5	(Portugal) M Larcher de Brito	6	5	3
(Canada) M-È Pelletier	4	7	6
WC	(United States) J Abaza	3	6	4
(United States) L Davis	6	3	6
7	(United States) C Vandeweghe	3	2
WC	(United States) M Sanchez	6	6
(Canada) H El Tabakh	6	6
(Brazil) R Vaisemberg	2	0

Quarterfinals
(Canada) M-È Pelletier	6	1	6^{4}
(United States) L Davis	4	6	7^{7}
WC	(United States) M Sanchez	6	3	6
(Canada) H El Tabakh	3	6	4

Semifinals
(United States) L Davis	4	0
WC	(United States) M Sanchez	6	6
