= 2013 Audi Melbourne Pro Tennis Classic – Singles =

Singles
- 2013 Audi Melbourne Pro Tennis Classic

Final
- Champion: (Slovenia) Petra Rampre
- Runner-up: (Bulgaria) Dia Evtimova
- Score: 6–0, 6–1

Events
Singles	Doubles
← 2012 ·	Audi Melbourne Pro Tennis Classic	· 2014 →

Grace Min was the defending champion, having won the event in 2012, but chose not to defend her title.

Petra Rampre won the tournament, defeating Dia Evtimova in the final, 6–0, 6–1.

== Seeds ==
1. (Germany) Tatjana Maria (first round)
2. (United States) Maria Sanchez (first round)
3. (United States) Julia Cohen (first round)
4. (Portugal) Michelle Larcher de Brito (second round)
5. (United States) Irina Falconi (second round)
6. (Spain) Laura Pous Tió (second round)
7. (United States) Alison Riske (semifinals)
8. (Paraguay) Verónica Cepede Royg (quarterfinals)

== Main draw ==
=== Key ===
- Q = Qualifier
- WC = Wild card
- LL = Lucky loser
- Alt = Alternate
- SE = Special exempt
- PR = Protected ranking
- ITF = ITF entry
- JE = Junior exempt
- w/o = Walkover
- r = Retired
- d = Defaulted
- SR = Special ranking

=== Finals ===
Semifinals
Q	(Switzerland) Belinda Bencic	3	6	0
(Slovenia) Petra Rampre	6	0	6
(Bulgaria) Dia Evtimova	3	7^{8}	6
7	(United States) Alison Riske	6	6^{6}	1

Final
(Slovenia) Petra Rampre	6	6
(Bulgaria) Dia Evtimova	0	1

=== Top half ===
First round
1	(Germany) T Maria	1	3
Q	(Switzerland) B Bencic	6	6
(Italy) A Brianti	1	7	2
(United States) S Rogers	6	5	6
WC	(United States) J Abaza	6	6
(United States) J Elie	2	2
WC	(United States) A Stevenson	7^{8}	2	6^{2}
5	(United States) I Falconi	6^{6}	6	7^{7}
3	(United States) J Cohen	7	2	3
(United States) S Crawford	5	6	6
(Brazil) MF Alves	3	6^{3}
(Belarus) I Kremen	6	7^{7}
(Slovenia) P Rampre	6	4	6
(Japan) M Hibi	3	6	0
Q	(Ukraine) A Sotnikova	5	2
6	(Spain) L Pous Tió	7	6

Second round
Q	(Switzerland) B Bencic	6	4	6
(United States) S Rogers	4	6	4
WC	(United States) J Abaza	6	6
5	(United States) I Falconi	1	2
(United States) S Crawford	7	3	2
(Belarus) I Kremen	5	6	6
(Slovenia) P Rampre	1	6	7^{7}
6	(Spain) L Pous Tió	6	2	0^{0}

Quarterfinals
Q	(Switzerland) B Bencic	6	4	6
WC	(United States) J Abaza	1	6	1
(Belarus) I Kremen	6	4	1
(Slovenia) P Rampre	0	6	6

Semifinals
Q	(Switzerland) B Bencic	3	6	0
(Slovenia) P Rampre	6	0	6

=== Bottom half ===
First round
8	(Paraguay) V Cepede Royg	6	7
(Australia) J Moore	1	5
(United States) V Duval	3	7^{7}	7
(Russia) A Rodionova	6	6^{4}	5
(Bulgaria) D Evtimova	6	6
(Czech Republic) K Kramperová	1	4
SE	(United States) A Kiick	6	6^{6}	0
4	(Portugal) M Larcher de Brito	2	7^{8}	6
7	(United States) A Riske	6	6
WC	(United States) E Lumpkin	3	3
(United States) S Vickery	7^{7}	6
Q	(United States) L Chirico	6^{2}	4
WC	(United States) J Brady	4	3
Q	(Croatia) J Pandžić	6	6
(United States) M Brengle	5	7^{8}	6
2	(United States) M Sanchez	7	6^{6}	1

Second round
8	(Paraguay) V Cepede Royg	4	2
(United States) V Duval	6	4^{r}
(Bulgaria) D Evtimova	3	6	6
4	(Portugal) M Larcher de Brito	6	4	4
7	(United States) A Riske	6	2	6
(United States) S Vickery	3	6	3
Q	(Croatia) J Pandžić	2	6^{4}
(United States) M Brengle	6	7^{7}

Quarterfinals
8	(Paraguay) V Cepede Royg	2	4
(Bulgaria) D Evtimova	6	6
7	(United States) A Riske	6	4	6
(United States) M Brengle	4	6	3

Semifinals
(Bulgaria) D Evtimova	3	7^{8}	6
7	(United States) A Riske	6	6^{6}	1
