= 2016 Waco Showdown =

- Date: 7–13 November
- Edition: 2nd
- Category: ITF Women's Circuit
- Prize money: $50,000
- Surface: Hard
- Location: Waco, Texas, United States

Champions

Singles
- (Brazil) Beatriz Haddad Maia

Doubles
- (Netherlands) Michaëlla Krajicek / (United States) Taylor Townsend
| ← 2015 · | Waco Showdown | · 2017 → |

The 2016 Waco Showdown was a professional tennis tournament played on outdoor hard courts. It was the 2nd edition of the tournament and part of the 2016 ITF Women's Circuit, offering a total of $50,000 in prize money. It took place in Waco, Texas, United States, on 7–13 November 2016.

== Singles main draw entrants ==
=== Seeds ===
| Country | Player | Rank^{1} | Seed |
|---|---|---|---|
| USA | Samantha Crawford | 105 | 1 |
| PAR | Verónica Cepede Royg | 111 | 2 |
| USA | Jennifer Brady | 116 | 3 |
| USA | Taylor Townsend | 133 | 4 |
| SWE | Rebecca Peterson | 136 | 5 |
| USA | Grace Min | 138 | 6 |
| USA | Sachia Vickery | 142 | 7 |
| AUT | Barbara Haas | 149 | 8 |

- ^{1} Rankings as of 31 October 2016.

=== Other entrants ===
The following player received a wildcard into the singles main draw:

- (United States) Usue Maitane Arconada
- (United States) Danielle Collins
- (United States) Ellie Halbauer
- (United States) Blair Shankle

The following player received entry by a protected ranking:

- (Netherlands) Michaëlla Krajicek

The following player received entry by a special exempt:

- (Brazil) Beatriz Haddad Maia

The following player received entry by a junior exempt:

- (Canada) Bianca Andreescu

The following players received entry from the qualifying draw:

- (Romania) Mihaela Buzărnescu
- (Canada) Gabriela Dabrowski
- (United States) Chanelle Van Nguyen
- (United States) Caitlin Whoriskey

The following player received entry by a lucky loser spot:

- (United States) Ashley Weinhold

== Champions ==
=== Singles ===
- (Brazil) Beatriz Haddad Maia def. (United States) Grace Min, 6–2, 3–6, 6–1

=== Doubles ===
- (Netherlands) Michaëlla Krajicek / (United States) Taylor Townsend def. (Romania) Mihaela Buzărnescu / (Mexico) Renata Zarazúa, walkover
