= 2017 Waco Showdown – Singles =

Singles
- 2017 Waco Showdown

Final
- Champion: (United States) Taylor Townsend
- Runner-up: (Croatia) Ajla Tomljanović
- Score: 6–3, 2–6, 6–2

Events
Singles	Doubles
← 2016 ·	Waco Showdown	· 2018 →

Beatriz Haddad Maia was the defending champion, but chose not to participate.

Taylor Townsend won the title, defeating Ajla Tomljanović in the final, 6–3, 2–6, 6–2.

== Seeds ==
1. (United States) Taylor Townsend (champion)
2. (United States) Nicole Gibbs (second round)
3. (United States) Sofia Kenin (semifinals)
4. (United States) Kristie Ahn (first round, retired)
5. (Slovakia) Anna Karolína Schmiedlová (quarterfinals)
6. (United States) Irina Falconi (second round)
7. (United States) Julia Boserup (first round)
8. (United States) Jamie Loeb (second round)

== Draw ==
=== Key ===
- Q = Qualifier
- WC = Wild card
- LL = Lucky loser
- Alt = Alternate
- SE = Special exempt
- PR = Protected ranking
- ITF = ITF entry
- JE = Junior exempt
- w/o = Walkover
- r = Retired
- d = Defaulted
- SR = Special ranking

=== Finals ===
Semifinals
1	(United States) Taylor Townsend	6	6
3	(United States) Sofia Kenin	1	4
(Sweden) Rebecca Peterson	3	3
(Croatia) Ajla Tomljanović	6	6

Final
1	(United States) Taylor Townsend	6	2	6
(Croatia) Ajla Tomljanović	3	6	2

=== Top half ===
First round
1	(United States) T Townsend	6	6
WC	(South Africa) T van Zyl	0	0
(United States) UM Arconada	6	1	6
PR	(United States) J Pegula	4	6	4
(Turkey) Ç Büyükakçay	6	6
Q	(United States) V Duval	4	4
WC	(United States) M Mateas	2	5
5	(Slovakia) AK Schmiedlová	6	7
3	(United States) S Kenin	7	6
(Bulgaria) S Karatantcheva	5	0
Q	(United States) K Stewart	4	6	7
WC	(United States) S Marand	6	0	5
(United States) G Min	4	3
(United States) D Lao	6	6
(Russia) A Komardina	3	1
8	(United States) J Loeb	6	6

Second round
1	(United States) T Townsend	6	6
(United States) UM Arconada	1	0
(Turkey) Ç Büyükakçay	3	6	5
5	(Slovakia) AK Schmiedlová	6	2	7
3	(United States) S Kenin	6	6
Q	(United States) K Stewart	1	1
(United States) D Lao	3	6	6
8	(United States) J Loeb	6	4	3

Quarterfinals
1	(United States) T Townsend	6	6
5	(Slovakia) AK Schmiedlová	1	0
3	(United States) S Kenin	6	6
(United States) D Lao	4	3

Semifinals
1	(United States) T Townsend	6	6
3	(United States) S Kenin	1	4

=== Bottom half ===
First round
6	(United States) I Falconi	6	6
(Canada) K Sebov	2	0
(New Zealand) M Erakovic	3	1
Q	(Norway) U Eikeri	6	6
(Sweden) R Peterson	6	7^{7}
WC	(United States) M Sanchez	4	6^{4}
Q	(Belgium) A-S Mestach	0
4	(United States) K Ahn	5^{r}
7	(United States) J Boserup	6^{7}	7^{7}	1
(Switzerland) S Vögele	7^{9}	6^{1}	6
(United States) K Day	6	5	6
(Mexico) V Rodríguez	0	7	4
(Croatia) A Tomljanović	6	6
(United States) A Anisimova	2	2
(Bulgaria) E Kostova	2	5
2	(United States) N Gibbs	6	7

Second round
6	(United States) I Falconi	2	6^{5}
Q	(Norway) U Eikeri	6	7^{7}
(Sweden) R Peterson	6	0
Q	(Belgium) A-S Mestach	1	0^{r}
(Switzerland) S Vögele	6	3	2
(United States) K Day	2	6	6
(Croatia) A Tomljanović	6^{5}	6	6
2	(United States) N Gibbs	7^{7}	1	4

Quarterfinals
Q	(Norway) U Eikeri	1	4
(Sweden) R Peterson	6	6
(United States) K Day	4	2
(Croatia) A Tomljanović	6	6

Semifinals
(Sweden) R Peterson	3	3
(Croatia) A Tomljanović	6	6
