= 2012 Colorado International – Singles =

Singles
- 2012 Colorado International

Final
- Champion: (United States) Nicole Gibbs
- Runner-up: (France) Julie Coin
- Score: 6–2, 3–6, 6–4

Events
Singles	Doubles
- Colorado International

This was a new event in 2012.

Nicole Gibbs won the title, defeating Julie Coin in the final, 6–2, 3–6, 6–4.

== Seeds ==
1. (Portugal) Michelle Larcher de Brito (second round)
2. (United States) Alexa Glatch (quarterfinals)
3. (United States) Madison Brengle (quarterfinals)
4. (France) Victoria Larrière (second round)
5. (Canada) Sharon Fichman (first round)
6. (China) Zheng Saisai (first round)
7. (United States) Maria Sanchez (first round)
8. (South Africa) Chanel Simmonds (second round)

== Draw ==
Key

- Q = Qualifier
- WC = Wild card
- LL = Lucky loser
- Alt = Alternate
- ITF = ITF entry
- PR = Protected ranking
- SR = Special ranking
- SE = Special exempt
- JE = Junior exempt
- JR = Junior Accelerator Programme entrant
- CO = College Accelerator Programme entrant
- NG = Next Gen Accelerator Program entrant
- w/o = Walkover
- r = Retired
- d = Defaulted

=== Finals ===
Semifinals
(France) Julie Coin	6^{4}	6	6
(Venezuela) Gabriela Paz	7^{7}	4	0
(Japan) Rika Fujiwara	6	6^{5}	6^{2}
Q	(United States) Nicole Gibbs	3	7^{7}	7^{7}

Final
(France) Julie Coin	2	6	4
Q	(United States) Nicole Gibbs	6	3	6

=== Top half ===
First round
1	(Portugal) M Larcher de Brito	7	6
Q	(United States) T Kinard	5	3
(Australia) S Peers	4	3
(Canada) M-È Pelletier	6	6
(France) J Coin	6	6
Q	(United States) J Abaza	3	1
(United States) L Litvak	2	3
8	(South Africa) C Simmonds	6	6
4	(France) V Larrière	6	6^{3}	7
(United States) A Muhammed	3	7^{7}	5
(Brazil) MF Alves	2	1
(United States) J Elie	6	6
(United States) K Hardebeck	3	7	6^{8}
(Venezuela) G Paz	6	5	7^{10}
WC	(Russia) V Bardina	7	7^{7}
7	(United States) M Sanchez	5	6^{4}

Second round
1	(Portugal) M Larcher de Brito	2	2
(Canada) M-È Pelletier	6	6
(France) J Coin	7	6
8	(South Africa) C Simmonds	5	1
4	(France) V Larrière	3	3
(United States) J Elie	6	6
(Venezuela) G Paz	7^{7}	6
WC	(Russia) V Bardina	6^{1}	3

Quarterfinals
(Canada) M-È Pelletier	1	4
(France) J Coin	6	6
(United States) J Elie	3	5
(Venezuela) G Paz	6	7

Semifinals
(France) J Coin	6^{4}	6	6
(Venezuela) G Paz	7^{7}	4	0

=== Bottom half ===
First round
6	(China) S Zheng	5	2
SR	(China) Y Zhou	7	6
(Japan) R Fujiwara	6	6
(Japan) A Nakamura	2	3
(United States) C-y Hsu	6	6
(Russia) A Rodionova	1	2
(United States) A Weinhold	0	6	4
3	(United States) M Brengle	6	4	6
5	(Canada) S Fichman	6^{4}	0
Q	(United States) N Gibbs	7^{7}	6
Q	(Japan) M Hibi	6	6
(Japan) M Eguchi	1	3
(United States) S Rogers	6	6
(Japan) S Akita	4	4
(Venezuela) A Pérez	3	4
2	(United States) A Glatch	6	6

Second round
SR	(China) Y Zhou	5	2
(Japan) R Fujiwara	7	6
(United States) C-y Hsu	6^{1}	1
3	(United States) M Brengle	7^{7}	6
Q	(United States) N Gibbs	6	6
Q	(Japan) M Hibi	3	3
(United States) S Rogers	1	3
2	(United States) A Glatch	6	6

Quarterfinals
(Japan) R Fujiwara	6	6
3	(United States) M Brengle	3	4
Q	(United States) N Gibbs	6	6
2	(United States) A Glatch	1	4

Semifinals
(Japan) R Fujiwara	6	6^{5}	6^{2}
Q	(United States) N Gibbs	3	7^{7}	7^{7}
