= 2012 Audi Melbourne Pro Tennis Classic – Doubles =

Doubles
- 2012 Audi Melbourne Pro Tennis Classic

Final
- Champions: (Brazil) Maria Fernanda Alves (Australia) Jessica Moore
- Runners-up: (Canada) Marie-Ève Pelletier (Ukraine) Alyona Sotnikova
- Score: 6–7^{(6–8)}, 6–3, [10–8]

Events
Singles	Doubles
← 2011 ·	Audi Melbourne Pro Tennis Classic	· 2013 →

Alyona Sotnikova and Lenka Wienerová were the defending champions, but Wienerová chose not to participate. Sotnikova partnered up with Marie-Ève Pelletier, but lost in the final to Maria Fernanda Alves and Jessica Moore, 6–7^{(6–8)}, 6–3, [10–8].

== Seeds ==
1. (United States) Maria Sanchez / (United States) Yasmin Schnack (quarterfinals)
2. (Canada) Marie-Ève Pelletier / (Ukraine) Alyona Sotnikova (final)
3. (Australia) Sally Peers / (Australia) Olivia Rogowska (semifinals)
4. (Brazil) Maria Fernanda Alves / (Australia) Jessica Moore (champions)

== Draw ==
=== Key ===
- Q = Qualifier
- WC = Wild card
- LL = Lucky loser
- Alt = Alternate
- SE = Special exempt
- PR = Protected ranking
- ITF = ITF entry
- JE = Junior exempt
- w/o = Walkover
- r = Retired
- d = Defaulted
- SR = Special ranking

=== Draw ===
First round
1	(United States) M Sanchez (United States) Y Schnack	7^{7}	3	[10]
(Russia) E Bovina (Israel) J Glushko	6^{1}	6	[2]
(Japan) A Omae (Brazil) R Vaisemberg	6	6
(United States) G Min (United States) M Oudin	4	4
4	(Brazil) MF Alves (Australia) J Moore	6	6
(United States) Cha Scholl (United States) Chi Scholl	4	4
(Canada) G Dabrowski (United States) L Litvak	6	2	[9]
(United States) I Falconi (United States) C Vandeweghe	3	6	[11]
WC	(United States) V Bensimon (United States) N Janowicz	2	1
(United States) C Gullickson (United States) A Weinhold	6	6
(United States) M Brengle (United States) C-y Hsu	6	3	[4]
3	(Australia) S Peers (Australia) O Rogowska	3	6	[10]
(United States) S Crawford (United States) A Kiick	6	6
(United States) G Brodsky (Australia) I Holland	3	1
(United States) A Riske (United States) S Rogers	4	1
2	(Canada) M-È Pelletier (Ukraine) A Sotnikova	6	6

Quarterfinals
1	(United States) M Sanchez (United States) Y Schnack	1	6	[7]
(Japan) A Omae (Brazil) R Vaisemberg	6	0	[10]
4	(Brazil) MF Alves (Australia) J Moore	w/o
(United States) I Falconi (United States) C Vandeweghe
(United States) C Gullickson (United States) A Weinhold	6	3	[4]
3	(Australia) S Peers (Australia) O Rogowska	0	6	[10]
(United States) S Crawford (United States) A Kiick	6	5	[8]
2	(Canada) M-È Pelletier (Ukraine) A Sotnikova	3	7	[10]

Semifinals
(Japan) A Omae (Brazil) R Vaisemberg	3	6	[7]
4	(Brazil) MF Alves (Australia) J Moore	6	1	[10]
3	(Australia) S Peers (Australia) O Rogowska	3	5
2	(Canada) M-È Pelletier (Ukraine) A Sotnikova	6	7

Finals
4	(Brazil) MF Alves (Australia) J Moore	6^{6}	6	[10]
2	(Canada) M-È Pelletier (Ukraine) A Sotnikova	7^{8}	3	[8]
