= 2015 Waco Showdown =

- Date: 2–8 November
- Edition: 1st
- Category: ITF Women's Circuit
- Prize money: $50,000
- Surface: Hard
- Location: Waco, United States

Champions

Singles
- (Switzerland) Viktorija Golubic

Doubles
- (United States) Nicole Gibbs / (United States) Vania King
| Waco Showdown | · 2016 → |

The 2015 Waco Showdown was a professional tennis tournament played on outdoor hard courts. It was the first edition of the tournament and part of the 2015 ITF Women's Circuit, offering a total of $50,000 in prize money. It took place in Waco, United States, on 2–8 November 2015.

== Singles main draw entrants ==
=== Seeds ===
| Country | Player | Rank^{1} | Seed |
|---|---|---|---|
| USA | Anna Tatishvili | 108 | 1 |
| GBR | Naomi Broady | 118 | 2 |
| USA | Nicole Gibbs | 130 | 3 |
| SWE | Rebecca Peterson | 141 | 4 |
| ISR | Julia Glushko | 142 | 5 |
| SVK | Jana Čepelová | 148 | 6 |
| RUS | Alla Kudryavtseva | 152 | 7 |
| PAR | Verónica Cepede Royg | 166 | 8 |

- ^{1} Rankings as of 26 October 2015

=== Other entrants ===
The following players received wildcards into the singles main draw:

- (United States) Jennifer Brady
- (United States) Kiah Generette
- (United States) Vania King
- (United States) Elizabeth Profit

The following players received entry from the qualifying draw:

- (Brazil) Paula Cristina Gonçalves
- (Austria) Barbara Haas
- (Argentina) Florencia Molinero
- (Mexico) Ana Sofía Sánchez

The following player received entry by a special exempt:

- (Serbia) Jovana Jakšić

== Champions ==
=== Singles ===
- (Switzerland) Viktorija Golubic def. (United States) Nicole Gibbs, 6–2, 6–1

=== Doubles ===
- (United States) Nicole Gibbs / (United States) Vania King def. (Israel) Julia Glushko / (Sweden) Rebecca Peterson, 6–4, 6–4
