= 2017 Waco Showdown =

- Date: 6–12 November
- Edition: 3rd
- Category: ITF Women's Circuit
- Prize money: $80,000
- Surface: Hard
- Location: Waco, United States

Champions

Singles
- (United States) Taylor Townsend

Doubles
- (United States) Sofia Kenin / (Russia) Anastasiya Komardina
← 2016 ·	Waco Showdown	· 2018 →

The 2017 Waco Showdown was a professional tennis tournament played on outdoor hard courts. It was the third edition of the tournament and was part of the 2017 ITF Women's Circuit. It took place in Waco, United States, on 6–12 November 2017.

== Singles main draw entrants ==
=== Seeds ===
Country	Player	Rank^{1}	Seed
USA	Taylor Townsend	107	1
USA	Nicole Gibbs	108	2
USA	Sofia Kenin	114	3
USA	Kristie Ahn	115	4
SVK	Anna Karolína Schmiedlová	132	5
USA	Irina Falconi	133	6
USA	Julia Boserup	138	7
USA	Jamie Loeb	140	8

- ^{1} Rankings as of 30 October 2017.

=== Other entrants ===
The following players received a wildcard into the singles main draw:

- (United States) Sanaz Marand
- (United States) Maria Mateas
- (United States) Maria Sanchez
- (South Africa) Theresa van Zyl

The following player received entry using a protected ranking:

- (United States) Jessica Pegula

The following players received entry from the qualifying draw:

- (United States) Victoria Duval
- (Norway) Ulrikke Eikeri
- (Belgium) An-Sophie Mestach
- (United States) Katerina Stewart

== Champions ==
=== Singles ===
- (United States) Taylor Townsend def. (Croatia) Ajla Tomljanović, 6–3, 2–6, 6–2

=== Doubles ===
- (United States) Sofia Kenin / (Russia) Anastasiya Komardina def. (United States) Jessica Pegula / (United States) Taylor Townsend, 7–5, 5–7, [11–9]
