= 2016 Waco Showdown – Doubles =

Doubles
- 2016 Waco Showdown

Final
- Champions: (Netherlands) Michaëlla Krajicek (United States) Taylor Townsend
- Runners-up: (Romania) Mihaela Buzărnescu (Mexico) Renata Zarazúa
- Score: Walkover

Events
Singles	Doubles
← 2015 ·	Waco Showdown	· 2017 →

Nicole Gibbs and Vania King were the defending champions, but both players chose not to participate.

Michaëlla Krajicek and Taylor Townsend won the title after Mihaela Buzărnescu and Renata Zarazúa withdrew from the final.

== Seeds ==
1. (Netherlands) Michaëlla Krajicek / (United States) Taylor Townsend (champions)
2. (United States) Nicole Melichar / (Sweden) Rebecca Peterson (quarterfinals, withdrew)
3. (United States) Ashley Weinhold / (United States) Caitlin Whoriskey (semifinals)
4. (Romania) Mihaela Buzărnescu / (Mexico) Renata Zarazúa (final, withdrew)

== Draw ==
=== Key ===
- Q = Qualifier
- WC = Wild card
- LL = Lucky loser
- Alt = Alternate
- ITF = ITF entry
- PR = Protected ranking
- SR = Special ranking
- SE = Special exempt
- JE = Junior exempt
- JR = Junior Accelerator Programme entrant
- CO = College Accelerator Programme entrant
- NG = Next Gen Accelerator Program entrant
- w/o = Walkover
- r = Retired
- d = Defaulted

First round
(United States) K Ahn (United States) C Harrison	6	2	[11]
(Brazil) B Haddad Maia (Russia) A Pivovarova	3	6	[9]
(United States) UM Arconada (Hungary) F Stollár	6	4	[7]
(Russia) V Flink (Ukraine) E Ianchuk	3	6	[10]
(United States) E Profit (United States) B Shankle
(United States) S Chang (United States) C Scholl	w/o

Quarterfinals
1	(Netherlands) M Krajicek (United States) T Townsend	6	5	[10]
(United States) K Ahn (United States) C Harrison	2	7	[7]
3	(United States) A Weinhold (United States) C Whoriskey	w/o
(Russia) V Flink (Ukraine) E Ianchuk
(United States) E Halbauer (United States) J Wacnik	6	0	[11]
4	(Romania) M Buzărnescu (Mexico) R Zarazúa	4	6	[13]
(United States) S Chang (United States) C Scholl	w/o
2	(United States) N Melichar (Sweden) R Peterson

Semifinals
1	(Netherlands) M Krajicek (United States) T Townsend	6	7^{10}
3	(United States) A Weinhold (United States) C Whoriskey	1	6^{8}
4	(Romania) M Buzărnescu (Mexico) R Zarazúa	6	6
(United States) S Chang (United States) C Scholl	3	0

Final
1	(Netherlands) M Krajicek (United States) T Townsend	w/o
4	(Romania) M Buzărnescu (Mexico) R Zarazúa
