= 2015 Waco Showdown – Doubles =

Doubles
- 2015 Waco Showdown

Final
- Champions: (United States) Nicole Gibbs (United States) Vania King
- Runners-up: (Israel) Julia Glushko (Sweden) Rebecca Peterson
- Score: 6–4, 6–4

Events
Singles	Doubles
← 2014 ·	Waco Showdown	· 2016 →

This was a new event in the ITF Women's Circuit.

Wildcards Nicole Gibbs and Vania King won the title, defeating Julia Glushko and Rebecca Peterson in the final, 6–4, 6–4.

== Seeds ==
1. (United States) Maria Sanchez / (Liechtenstein) Stephanie Vogt (semifinals)
2. (Brazil) Paula Cristina Gonçalves / (United States) Sanaz Marand (first round)
3. (Paraguay) Verónica Cepede Royg / (Argentina) María Irigoyen (first round)
4. (Israel) Julia Glushko / (Sweden) Rebecca Peterson (final)

== Draw ==
=== Key ===
- Q = Qualifier
- WC = Wild card
- LL = Lucky loser
- Alt = Alternate
- SE = Special exempt
- PR = Protected ranking
- ITF = ITF entry
- JE = Junior exempt
- w/o = Walkover
- r = Retired
- d = Defaulted
- SR = Special ranking

First round
1	(United States) M Sanchez (Liechtenstein) S Vogt	7^{7}	7^{7}
WC	(United States) R Anderson (United States) S Crawford	6^{5}	6^{3}
(United States) J Cako (Mexico) R Zarazúa	6	6
(Romania) M Buzărnescu (Bulgaria) E Kostova	1	3
4	(Israel) J Glushko (Sweden) R Peterson	6	6
(Mexico) V Rodríguez (Mexico) M Zacarías	4	4
(United States) A Weinhold (United States) C Whoriskey	6^{7}	5
(United States) J Boserup (United Kingdom) N Broady	7^{9}	7
WC	(United States) K Generette (United States) B Shankle	0	6	[4]
(United States) J Abaza (Switzerland) V Golubic	6	4	[10]
(Czech Republic) K Kramperová (Israel) S Pe'er	6	6
3	(Paraguay) V Cepede Royg (Argentina) M Irigoyen	3	4
WC	(United States) N Gibbs (United States) V King	6	6
(Brazil) G Cé (Argentina) F Molinero	3	2
(United States) J Brady (Chile) A Guarachi	7^{7}	4	[10]
2	(Brazil) PC Gonçalves (United States) S Marand	6^{3}	6	[4]

Quarterfinals
1	(United States) M Sanchez (Liechtenstein) S Vogt	6	6
(United States) J Cako (Mexico) R Zarazúa	2	2
4	(Israel) J Glushko (Sweden) R Peterson	6	3	[10]
(United States) J Boserup (United Kingdom) N Broady	3	6	[6]
(United States) J Abaza (Switzerland) V Golubic	6	6
(Czech Republic) K Kramperová (Israel) S Pe'er	4	0
WC	(United States) N Gibbs (United States) V King	w/o
(United States) J Brady (Chile) A Guarachi

Semifinals
1	(United States) M Sanchez (Liechtenstein) S Vogt	4	3
4	(Israel) J Glushko (Sweden) R Peterson	6	6
(United States) J Abaza (Switzerland) V Golubic	4	6	[9]
WC	(United States) N Gibbs (United States) V King	6	4	[11]

Final
4	(Israel) J Glushko (Sweden) R Peterson	4	4
WC	(United States) N Gibbs (United States) V King	6	6
