= 2015 Waco Showdown – Singles =

Singles
- 2015 Waco Showdown

Final
- Champion: (Switzerland) Viktorija Golubic
- Runner-up: (United States) Nicole Gibbs
- Score: 6–2, 6–1

Events
| Singles | Doubles |
| ← 2014 · | Waco Showdown | · 2016 → |

This was a new event in the ITF Women's Circuit.

Viktorija Golubic won the inaugural title, defeating Nicole Gibbs in the final, 6–2, 6–1.

== Seeds ==
1. (United States) Anna Tatishvili (quarterfinals)
2. (United Kingdom) Naomi Broady (quarterfinals)
3. (United States) Nicole Gibbs (final)
4. (Sweden) Rebecca Peterson (quarterfinals)
5. (Israel) Julia Glushko (semifinals)
6. (Slovakia) Jana Čepelová (second round)
7. (Russia) Alla Kudryavtseva (first round)
8. (Paraguay) Verónica Cepede Royg (semifinals)

== Main draw ==
=== Key ===
- Q = Qualifier
- WC = Wild card
- LL = Lucky loser
- Alt = Alternate
- SE = Special exempt
- PR = Protected ranking
- ITF = ITF entry
- JE = Junior exempt
- w/o = Walkover
- r = Retired
- d = Defaulted
- SR = Special ranking

=== Finals ===
Semifinals
8 | (Paraguay) Verónica Cepede Royg | 6 | 2 | 1
(Switzerland) Viktorija Golubic | 1 | 6 | 6
3 | (United States) Nicole Gibbs | 5 | 6 | 6
5 | (Israel) Julia Glushko | 7 | 4 | 2

Final
(Switzerland) Viktorija Golubic | 6 | 6
3 | (United States) Nicole Gibbs | 2 | 1

=== Top half ===
First round
1 | (United States) A Tatishvili | 6 | 6
WC | (United States) V King | 3 | 4
(United States) G Min | 6 | 6
(Mexico) V Rodríguez | 1 | 4
(United States) M Sanchez | 6 | 6
SE | (Serbia) J Jakšić | 3 | 4
(Argentina) M Irigoyen | 1 | 4
8 | (Paraguay) V Cepede Royg | 6 | 6
4 | (Sweden) R Peterson | 6 | 6
(Brazil) G Cé | 1 | 2
Q | (Austria) B Haas | 4 | 7 | 6
WC | (United States) J Brady | 6 | 5 | 3
(Switzerland) V Golubic | 6 | 1 | 6
Q | (Brazil) PC Gonçalves | 2 | 6 | 1
WC | (United States) E Profit | 0 | 0
6 | (Slovakia) J Čepelová | 6 | 6

Second round
1 | (United States) A Tatishvili | 6 | 6
(United States) G Min | 1 | 2
(United States) M Sanchez | 3 | 2
8 | (Paraguay) V Cepede Royg | 6 | 6
4 | (Sweden) R Peterson | 6 | 6
Q | (Austria) B Haas | 4 | 2
(Switzerland) V Golubic | 6 | 6
6 | (Slovakia) J Čepelová | 4 | 2

Quarterfinals
1 | (United States) A Tatishvili | 0 | 6 | 6^{5}
8 | (Paraguay) V Cepede Royg | 6 | 4 | 7^{7}
4 | (Sweden) R Peterson | 6 | 4 | 2
(Switzerland) V Golubic | 0 | 6 | 6

Semifinals
8 | (Paraguay) V Cepede Royg | 6 | 2 | 1
(Switzerland) V Golubic | 1 | 6 | 6

=== Bottom half ===
First round
7 | (Russia) A Kudryavtseva | 1 | 3
(United States) K Stewart | 6 | 6
Q | (Argentina) F Molinero | 2 | 2
(United States) K Ahn | 6 | 6
Q | (Mexico) AS Sánchez | 1 | 2
(Liechtenstein) S Vogt | 6 | 6
(Bulgaria) E Kostova | 3 | 6 | 1
3 | (United States) N Gibbs | 6 | 4 | 6
5 | (Israel) J Glushko | 6 | 6
(Japan) M Hibi | 4 | 3
(Mexico) M Zacarías | 3 | 3
(Israel) S Pe'er | 6 | 6
(United States) S Crawford | 3 | 1
(United States) J Boserup | 6 | 6
WC | (United States) K Generette | 5 | 3
2 | (United Kingdom) N Broady | 7 | 6

Second round
(United States) K Stewart | 3 | 3
(United States) K Ahn | 6 | 6
(Liechtenstein) S Vogt | 4 | 4
3 | (United States) N Gibbs | 6 | 6
5 | (Israel) J Glushko | 6 | 6
(Israel) S Pe'er | 0 | 2
(United States) J Boserup | 1 | 6^{5}
2 | (United Kingdom) N Broady | 6 | 7^{7}

Quarterfinals
(United States) K Ahn | 2 | 5
3 | (United States) N Gibbs | 6 | 7
5 | (Israel) J Glushko | 2 | 6 | 7^{7}
2 | (United Kingdom) N Broady | 6 | 4 | 6^{3}

Semifinals
3 | (United States) N Gibbs | 5 | 6 | 6
5 | (Israel) J Glushko | 7 | 4 | 2
