= 2017 Waco Showdown – Doubles =

Doubles
- 2017 Waco Showdown

Final
- Champion: (United States) Sofia Kenin (Russia) Anastasiya Komardina
- Runner-up: (United States) Jessica Pegula (United States) Taylor Townsend
- Score: 7–5, 5–7, [11–9]

Events
Singles	Doubles
← 2016 ·	Waco Showdown	· 2018 →

Michaëlla Krajicek and Taylor Townsend are the defending champions, however Krajicek chose to compete in Limoges instead.

Townsend played alongside Jessica Pegula, but they lost in the final to Sofia Kenin and Anastasiya Komardina, 7–5, 5–7, [11–9].

== Seeds ==
1. (Slovakia) Michaela Hončová / (Belgium) An-Sophie Mestach (quarterfinals, withdrew)
2. (United States) Ashley Weinhold / (United States) Caitlin Whoriskey (first round)
3. (United States) Julia Boserup / (United States) Kayla Day (first round)
4. (United States) Usue Maitane Arconada / (Argentina) María Irigoyen (quarterfinals)

== Draw ==
=== Key ===
- Q = Qualifier
- WC = Wild card
- LL = Lucky loser
- Alt = Alternate
- SE = Special exempt
- PR = Protected ranking
- ITF = ITF entry
- JE = Junior exempt
- w/o = Walkover
- r = Retired
- d = Defaulted
- SR = Special ranking

First round
1	(Slovakia) M Hončová (Belgium) A-S Mestach	6	6
(United States) J Elbaba (United States) A Rodgers	3	2
(United States) K Derienzo (United States) A Parks	4	1
(Venezuela) A Uzcátegui (United States) A Zhu	6	6
4	(United States) UM Arconada (Argentina) M Irigoyen	6	6
WC	(Russia) K Sorokolet (Slovakia) D Sujová	3	4
(Norway) U Eikeri (Chinese Taipei) C-y Hsu	1	6^{1}
(United States) J Pegula (United States) T Townsend	6	7^{7}
(Mexico) J Hinojosa Gómez (Ukraine) A Shakhraychuk	2	2
(United States) S Kenin (Russia) A Komardina	6	6
(United States) M Mateas (United States) M Sanchez	6^{4}	6	[10]
3	(United States) J Boserup (United States) K Day	7^{7}	1	[7]
(Russia) A Gabueva (Russia) N Kukharchuk	3	3
(United States) S Chang (United States) A Mueller	6	6
(Brazil) PC Gonçalves (United States) S Marand	4	6	[10]
2	(United States) A Weinhold (United States) C Whoriskey	6	4	[8]

Quarterfinals
1	(Slovakia) M Hončová (Belgium) A-S Mestach
(Venezuela) A Uzcátegui (United States) A Zhu	w/o
4	(United States) UM Arconada (Argentina) M Irigoyen	5	2
(United States) J Pegula (United States) T Townsend	7	6
(United States) S Kenin (Russia) A Komardina	6	6
(United States) M Mateas (United States) M Sanchez	3	2
(United States) S Chang (United States) A Mueller	3	6	[11]
(Brazil) PC Gonçalves (United States) S Marand	6	2	[13]

Semifinals
(Venezuela) A Uzcátegui (United States) A Zhu	1	2
(United States) J Pegula (United States) T Townsend	6	6
(United States) S Kenin (Russia) A Komardina	6	6
(Brazil) PC Gonçalves (United States) S Marand	3	2

Final
(United States) J Pegula (United States) T Townsend	5	7	[9]
(United States) S Kenin (Russia) A Komardina	7	5	[11]
