= 2016 Waco Showdown – Singles =

Singles
- 2016 Waco Showdown

Final
- Champion: (Brazil) Beatriz Haddad Maia
- Runner-up: (United States) Grace Min
- Score: 6–2, 3–6, 6–1

Events
| Singles | Doubles |
| ← 2015 · | Waco Showdown | · 2017 → |

Viktorija Golubic was the defending champion, but chose not to participate.

Beatriz Haddad Maia won the title, defeating Grace Min in the final, 6–2, 3–6, 6–1.

== Seeds ==
1. (United States) Samantha Crawford (semifinals)
2. (Paraguay) Verónica Cepede Royg (first round)
3. (United States) Jennifer Brady (first round)
4. (United States) Taylor Townsend (first round)
5. (Sweden) Rebecca Peterson (withdrew)
6. (United States) Grace Min (final)
7. (United States) Sachia Vickery (quarterfinals)
8. (Austria) Barbara Haas (first round)

== Main draw ==
=== Key ===
- Q = Qualifier
- WC = Wild card
- LL = Lucky loser
- Alt = Alternate
- ITF = ITF entry
- PR = Protected ranking
- SR = Special ranking
- SE = Special exempt
- JE = Junior exempt
- JR = Junior Accelerator Programme entrant
- CO = College Accelerator Programme entrant
- NG = Next Gen Accelerator Program entrant
- w/o = Walkover
- r = Retired
- d = Defaulted

=== Finals ===
Semifinals
1 | (United States) Samantha Crawford | 2 | 4
SE | (Brazil) Beatriz Haddad Maia | 6 | 6
6 | (United States) Grace Min | 2 | 6 | 6
(United States) Robin Anderson | 6 | 2 | 0

Final
SE | (Brazil) Beatriz Haddad Maia | 6 | 3 | 6
6 | (United States) Grace Min | 2 | 6 | 1

=== Top half ===
First round
1 | (United States) S Crawford | 6 | 7^{7}
PR | (Netherlands) M Krajicek | 4 | 6^{5}
(United Kingdom) L Robson | 4 | 4
Q | (Romania) M Buzărnescu | 6 | 6
LL | (United States) A Weinhold | 6 | 0 | 2
(Russia) A Pivovarova | 4 | 6 | 6
WC | (United States) D Collins | 6 | 5 | 6
Q | (Canada) G Dabrowski | 2 | 7 | 4
3 | (United States) J Brady | 5 | 4
SE | (Canada) B Andreescu | 7 | 6
WC | (United States) E Halbauer | 7^{7} | 4 | 2
SE | (Brazil) B Haddad Maia | 6^{5} | 6 | 6
Q | (United States) C Whoriskey | 2 | 5
(United States) J Elie | 6 | 7
(France) M Georges | 6 | 7^{7}
8 | (Austria) B Haas | 2 | 6^{5}

Second round
1 | (United States) S Crawford | 7^{7} | 6
Q | (Romania) M Buzărnescu | 6^{4} | 4
(Russia) A Pivovarova | 5 | 6 | 4
WC | (United States) D Collins | 7 | 2 | 6
SE | (Canada) B Andreescu | 6 | 6^{1} | 0^{r}
SE | (Brazil) B Haddad Maia | 3 | 7^{7} | 4
(United States) J Elie | 7 | 5 | 6
(France) M Georges | 5 | 7 | 2

Quarterfinals
1 | (United States) S Crawford | 6 | 6
WC | (United States) D Collins | 4 | 2
SE | (Brazil) B Haddad Maia | 7^{7} | 6
(United States) J Elie | 6^{2} | 3

Semifinals
1 | (United States) S Crawford | 2 | 4
SE | (Brazil) B Haddad Maia | 6 | 6

=== Bottom half ===
First round
6 | (United States) G Min | 6 | 6
(United States) K Ahn | 1 | 3
(Russia) V Flink | 7^{7} | 6
(Hungary) F Stollár | 6^{2} | 1
Q | (United States) C Van Nguyen | 7^{7} | 6
(United States) S Kenin | 6^{4} | 4
(Bulgaria) S Karatantcheva | 6 | 6
4 | (United States) T Townsend | 4 | 2
7 | (United States) S Vickery | 6 | 6
WC | (United States) B Shankle | 3 | 3
(Mexico) R Zarazúa | 5 | 3
(France) A Lim | 7 | 6
WC | (United States) UM Arconada | 6 | 6
(Argentina) C Pella | 3 | 1
(United States) R Anderson | 6 | 6
2 | (Paraguay) V Cepede Royg | 4 | 1

Second round
6 | (United States) G Min | 1
(Russia) V Flink | 0^{r}
Q | (United States) C Van Nguyen | 1 | 2
(Bulgaria) S Karatantcheva | 6 | 6
7 | (United States) S Vickery | 2 | 6 | 6
(France) A Lim | 6 | 4 | 3
WC | (United States) UM Arconada | 1 | 1
(United States) R Anderson | 6 | 6

Quarterfinals
6 | (United States) G Min | 6 | 2 | 7
(Bulgaria) S Karatantcheva | 0 | 6 | 5
7 | (United States) S Vickery | 1 | 5
(United States) R Anderson | 6 | 7

Semifinals
6 | (United States) G Min | 2 | 6 | 6
(United States) R Anderson | 6 | 2 | 0
