= 2013 Audi Melbourne Pro Tennis Classic =

- Date: April 29 – May 5
- Edition: 8th
- Location: Indian Harbour Beach, Florida, United States

Champions

Singles
- (Slovenia) Petra Rampre

Doubles
- (United States) Jan Abaza / (United States) Louisa Chirico
- Audi Melbourne Pro Tennis Classic

The 2013 Audi Melbourne Pro Tennis Classic was a professional tennis tournament played on outdoor clay courts. It is the eighth edition of the tournament which was part of the 2013 ITF Women's Circuit, offering a total of $50,000 in prize money. It took place in Indian Harbour Beach, Florida, United States, on April 29 – May 5, 2013.

== WTA entrants ==
=== Seeds ===
Country	Player	Rank^{1}	Seed
GER	Tatjana Maria	109	1
USA	Maria Sanchez	111	2
USA	Julia Cohen	122	3
POR	Michelle Larcher de Brito	137	4
USA	Irina Falconi	142	5
ESP	Laura Pous Tió	148	6
USA	Alison Riske	183	7
PAR	Verónica Cepede Royg	204	8

- ^{1} Rankings as of April 22, 2013

=== Other entrants ===
The following players received wildcards into the singles main draw:

- (United States) Jan Abaza
- (United States) Jennifer Brady
- (United States) Elizabeth Lumpkin
- (United States) Alexandra Stevenson

The following players received entry from the qualifying draw:

- (Switzerland) Belinda Bencic
- (United States) Louisa Chirico
- (Croatia) Jelena Pandžić
- (Ukraine) Alyona Sotnikova

The following player received entry by a Special Exempt:

- (United States) Allie Kiick

== Champions ==
=== Singles ===
- (Slovenia) Petra Rampre def. (Bulgaria) Dia Evtimova 6–0, 6–1

=== Doubles ===
- (United States) Jan Abaza / (United States) Louisa Chirico def. (United States) Asia Muhammad / (United States) Allie Will 6–4, 6–4
