= 2012 Colorado International – Doubles =

Doubles
- 2012 Colorado International

Final
- Champions: (Canada) Marie-Ève Pelletier (United States) Shelby Rogers
- Runners-up: (United States) Lauren Embree (United States) Nicole Gibbs
- Score: 6–3, 3–6, [12–10]

Events
Singles	Doubles
- Colorado International

This was a new event in 2012.

Marie-Ève Pelletier and Shelby Rogers won the title, defeating Lauren Embree and Nicole Gibbs in the final, 6–3, 3–6, [12–10].

== Seeds ==
1. (France) Julie Coin / (Canada) Sharon Fichman (first round)
2. (United States) Asia Muhammed / (United States) Maria Sanchez (quarterfinals)
3. (United States) Alexa Glatch / (Australia) Sally Peers (quarterfinals)
4. (United States) Madison Brengle / (South Africa) Chanel Simmonds (first round)

== Draw ==
Key

- Q = Qualifier
- WC = Wild card
- LL = Lucky loser
- Alt = Alternate
- ITF = ITF entry
- PR = Protected ranking
- SR = Special ranking
- SE = Special exempt
- JE = Junior exempt
- JR = Junior Accelerator Programme entrant
- CO = College Accelerator Programme entrant
- NG = Next Gen Accelerator Program entrant
- w/o = Walkover
- r = Retired
- d = Defaulted

=== Draw ===
First round
1	(France) J Coin (Canada) S Fichman	3	7	[7]
(Japan) M Eguchi (United States) S Krywacz	6	5	[10]
(United States) L Albanese (France) V Larrière	6	3	[7]
(Brazil) MF Alves (Venezuela) G Paz	2	6	[10]
3	(United States) A Glatch (Australia) S Peers	6	6
(United States) C-y Hsu (United States) A Weinhold	4	4
(Canada) M-È Pelletier (United States) S Rogers	6	6
(Japan) R Fujiwara (China) Y Zhou	3	2
(United States) L Litvak (Venezuela) A Pérez	6	6
(Japan) K Hisami (Japan) A Nakamura	3	3
WC	(United States) L Embree (United States) N Gibbs	5	6	[10]
4	(United States) M Brengle (South Africa) C Simmonds	7	1	[8]
(United States) J Elie (United States) E Lumpkin	6	6
WC	(United States) S Kalhorn (United States) A Parra	2	1
WC	(Russia) V Bardina (United States) R Weissmann	3	2
2	(United States) A Muhammed (United States) M Sanchez	6	6

Quarterfinals
(Japan) M Eguchi (United States) S Krywacz	5	2
(Brazil) MF Alves (Venezuela) G Paz	7	6
3	(United States) A Glatch (Australia) S Peers	2	6	[2]
(Canada) M-È Pelletier (United States) S Rogers	6	3	[10]
(United States) L Litvak (Venezuela) A Pérez	5	4
WC	(United States) L Embree (United States) N Gibbs	7	6
(United States) J Elie (United States) E Lumpkin	1	6	[13]
2	(United States) A Muhammed (United States) M Sanchez	6	1	[11]

Semifinals
(Brazil) MF Alves (Venezuela) G Paz	1	6	[8]
(Canada) M-È Pelletier (United States) S Rogers	6	4	[10]
WC	(United States) L Embree (United States) N Gibbs	6	6
(United States) J Elie (United States) E Lumpkin	4	4

Finals
(Canada) M-È Pelletier (United States) S Rogers	6	3	[12]
WC	(United States) L Embree (United States) N Gibbs	3	6	[10]
