= Colorado International =

- 2012 Colorado International

ITF Women's Tour
- Event name: Colorado International
- Location: Denver, United States
- Venue: Colorado Athletic Club-Inverness
- Category: ITF Women's Circuit
- Surface: Hard / Outdoor
- Draw: 32S/32Q/16D
- Prize money: US$50,000
- Website: Official Website

The Colorado International is a tournament for female professional tennis players played on outdoor hard courts. The event is classified as a 50K ITF Women's Circuit Tournament. It is held in Denver, United States, since 2012.

== Past finals ==
=== Singles ===
Year	Champion	Runner-up	Score
2012	(United States) Nicole Gibbs	(France) Julie Coin	6–2, 3–6, 6–4

=== Doubles ===
Year	Champions	Runners-up	Score
2012	(Canada) Marie-Ève Pelletier (United States) Shelby Rogers	(United States) Lauren Embree (United States) Nicole Gibbs	6–3, 3–6, [12–10]
