= 2013 Audi Melbourne Pro Tennis Classic – Doubles =

Doubles
- 2013 Audi Melbourne Pro Tennis Classic

Final
- Champions: (United States) Jan Abaza (United States) Louisa Chirico
- Runners-up: (United States) Asia Muhammad (United States) Allie Will
- Score: 6–4, 6–4

Events
Singles	Doubles
← 2012 ·	Audi Melbourne Pro Tennis Classic	· 2014 →

Maria Fernanda Alves and Jessica Moore were the defending champions, having won the event in 2012, but they lost in the quarterfinals to Jan Abaza and Louisa Chirico.

Julia Cohen and Tatjana Maria, originally seeded second, withdrew before the tournament began and were not replaced. As a result, their opponents Shelby Rogers and Nicola Slater were given a bye into the second round.

Abaza and Chirico won the tournament, defeating Asia Muhammad and Allie Will in the final, 6–4, 6–4.

== Seeds ==
1. (United States) Irina Falconi / (United States) Maria Sanchez (first round)
2. (United States) Julia Cohen / (Germany) Tatjana Maria (withdrew)
3. (United States) Asia Muhammad / (United States) Allie Will (final)
4. (Brazil) Maria Fernanda Alves / (Australia) Jessica Moore (quarterfinals)

== Draw ==
=== Key ===
- Q = Qualifier
- WC = Wild card
- LL = Lucky loser
- Alt = Alternate
- SE = Special exempt
- PR = Protected ranking
- ITF = ITF entry
- JE = Junior exempt
- w/o = Walkover
- r = Retired
- d = Defaulted
- SR = Special ranking

First round
1	(United States) I Falconi (United States) M Sanchez	3	7	[10]
(United States) E Harman (United States) E Lumpkin	6	5	[12]
Alt	(Japan) M Hibi (United States) D Starr	3	1
(United States) S Marand (United States) N Pluskota	6	6
4	(Brazil) MF Alves (Australia) J Moore	6	7
WC	(United States) V Bensimon (United States) C Woodson	2	5
(United States) J Elie (Australia) S Peers	6	5	[10]
(United States) S Crawford (United States) S Vickery	2	7	[6]
(Italy) A Brianti (United States) A Riske	6	5	[8]
(Czech Republic) K Kramperová (Belarus) I Kremen	4	7	[10]

Quarterfinals
(United States) E Harman (United States) E Lumpkin	3	7	[6]
(United States) S Marand (United States) N Pluskota	6	5	[10]
4	(Brazil) MF Alves (Australia) J Moore	6	4	[7]
(United States) J Abaza (United States) L Chirico	1	6	[10]
(United States) J Elie (Australia) S Peers	6^{3}	2
3	(United States) A Muhammad (United States) A Will	7^{7}	6
(Czech Republic) K Kramperová (Belarus) I Kremen	4	2
(United States) S Rogers (United Kingdom) N Slater	6	6

Semifinals
(United States) S Marand (United States) N Pluskota	3	0
(United States) J Abaza (United States) L Chirico	6	6
3	(United States) A Muhammad (United States) A Will	7	6
(United States) S Rogers (United Kingdom) N Slater	5	2

Final
(United States) J Abaza (United States) L Chirico	6	6
3	(United States) A Muhammad (United States) A Will	4	4
