= Waco Showdown =

- 2017 Waco Showdown

ITF Women's Tour
- Event name: Waco Showdown
- Location: Waco, Texas, United States
- Venue: Hurd Tennis Center at Baylor University
- Category: ITF Women's Circuit
- Surface: Hard
- Draw: 32S/32Q/16D
- Prize money: $80,000
- Website: wacotennisshowdown.com

The Waco Showdown is a tournament for professional female tennis players. The event, played on outdoor hardcourts, is classified as a $80,000 ITF Women's Circuit tournament and has been held in Waco, Texas, since 2015.

== Past finals ==
=== Singles ===
Year	Champion	Runner-up	Score
2017	(United States) Taylor Townsend	(Croatia) Ajla Tomljanović	6–3, 2–6, 6–2
2016	(Brazil) Beatriz Haddad Maia	(United States) Grace Min	6–2, 3–6, 6–1
2015	(Switzerland) Viktorija Golubic	(United States) Nicole Gibbs	6–2, 6–1

=== Doubles ===
Year	Champions	Runners-up	Score
2017	(United States) Sofia Kenin (Russia) Anastasiya Komardina	(United States) Jessica Pegula (United States) Taylor Townsend	7–5, 5–7, [11–9]
2016	(Netherlands) Michaëlla Krajicek (United States) Taylor Townsend	(Romania) Mihaela Buzărnescu (Mexico) Renata Zarazúa	w/0
2015	(United States) Nicole Gibbs (United States) Vania King	(Israel) Julia Glushko (Sweden) Rebecca Peterson	6–4, 6–4
