= Marie-Ève Pelletier =

Canadian tennis player

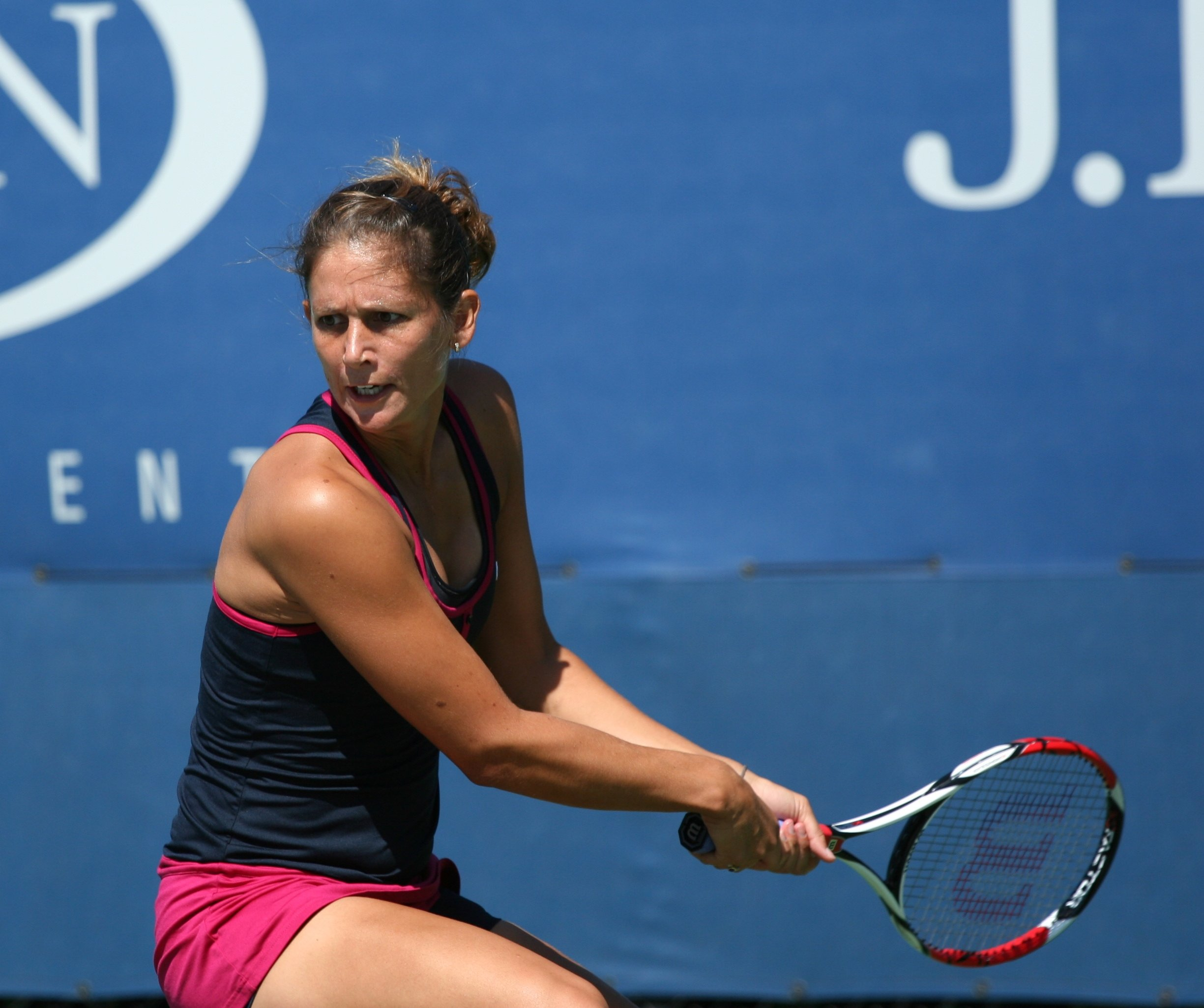
- Marie-Ève Pelletier at the 2009 US Open
- Country (sports): Canada
- Residence: Repentigny, Quebec
- Born: May 18, 1982 (age 44) Quebec City, Quebec
- Height: 1.73 m (5 ft 8 in)
- Turned pro: 1998
- Retired: January 9, 2013
- Plays: Right-handed (two-handed backhand)
- Prize money: $592,193

Singles
- Career record: 340–349
- Career titles: 3 ITF
- Highest ranking: No. 106 (June 20, 2005)

Grand Slam singles results
- Australian Open: 1R (2004)
- French Open: Q3 (2001)
- Wimbledon: Q2 (2004, 2005)
- US Open: Q3 (2002)

Doubles
- Career record: 305–251
- Career titles: 25 ITF
- Highest ranking: No. 54 (April 19, 2010)

Grand Slam doubles results
- Australian Open: 2R (2010)
- French Open: 1R (2010)
- Wimbledon: 1R (2005, 2010)
- US Open: 2R (2009)

Grand Slam mixed doubles results
- Wimbledon: 1R (2010)

Marie-Ève Pelletier (French pronunciation: [maʁi ɛv pɛltje]; born May 18, 1982) is a Canadian former professional tennis player. She reached career-high rankings by the WTA of 106 in singles and 54 in doubles.

== Tennis career ==
=== 1998–2013 ===
Marie-Ève played in one career Grand Slam singles match in 2004, at the Australian Open, qualifying for the tournament, before losing in the first round to Akiko Morigami. She is the previous winner of two events on the ITF Women's Circuit, the 2000 Virginia Beach and 2005 Waikoloa tournaments. Her best result in a WTA Tour event came at the 2005 Hyderabad Open, where she reached the quarterfinals. The biggest win of her career was when she beat then-world No. 16, Li Na, in straight sets in the first round of the 2006 Rogers Cup. She won in June 2012 the third singles title of her career at the $25k tournament in El Paso, beating Ashley Weinhold in the final.

Pelletier retired from pro tour on 9 January 2013, after her loss in the first round of the Australian Open qualifying.

=== Fed Cup ===
Marie-Ève was a regular on Canada's Fed Cup team, playing every year from 2002 to 2008 and again from 2010 to 2012. She amassed a singles record of 9–9 and a doubles record of 16–6 in Fed Cup play.

=== Life after tennis ===
Pelletier is now a tennis analyst for TVA Sports, a sports television network in Quebec. She also was a tennis analyst for RDS for the 2013 Rogers Cup and an assistant coach for Tennis Canada's National Training Centre in Montreal. Pelletier married former NHL goaltender Pascal Leclaire in July 2014 and gave birth to their daughter Zoé in May 2015.

== ITF Circuit finals ==
Legend
$100,000 tournaments
$75,000 tournaments
$50,000 tournaments
$25,000 tournaments
$10,000 tournaments

=== Singles: 9 (3 titles, 6 runner-ups) ===
Result	W–L	Date	Tournament	Tier	Surface	Opponent	Score
Loss	0–1	Mar 2000	ITF Nanjing, China	10,000	Hard	(China) Li Na	6–7^{(3–7)}, 2–6
Loss	0–2	Apr 2000	ITF Fresno, United States	25,000	Hard	(Australia) Rachel McQuillan	1–6, 1–6
Win	1–2	May 2000	ITF Virginia Beach, US	25,000	Clay	(Paraguay) Rossana de los Ríos	7–6^{(7–5)}, 6–2
Loss	1–3	Sep 2001	ITF Peachtree City, US	25,000	Hard	(Taiwan) Hsieh Su-wei	4–6, 6–3, 4–6
Loss	1–4	Nov 2001	ITF Pittsburgh, US	50,000	Hard (i)	(Russia) Alina Jidkova	4–6, 1–6
Loss	1–5	Sep 2002	Albuquerque Championships, US	75,000	Hard	(United States) Laura Granville	7–6^{(7–2)}, 4–6, 1–6
Win	2–5	Jan 2005	Waikoloa Challenger, US	50,000	Hard	(Czech Republic) Hana Šromová	4–6, 6–1, 6–4
Loss	2–6	Jun 2005	Open de Marseille, France	50,000	Clay	(Spain) Conchita Martínez Granados	1–6, 1–6
Win	3–6	Jun 2012	ITF El Paso, US	25,000	Hard	(United States) Ashley Weinhold	7–5, 6–4

=== Doubles: 51 (25 titles, 26 runner-ups) ===
Result	W–L	Date	Tournament	Tier	Surface	Partner	Opponents	Score
Win	1–0	Aug 1999	ITF Baltimore, US	10,000	Hard	(United States) Lauren Kalvaria	(United States) Candice de la Torre (Australia) Nadia Johnston	7–6, 6–3
Loss	1–1	Oct 2001	ITF Fresno, US	50,000	Hard	(United States) Ashley Harkleroad	(Argentina) Clarisa Fernández (United States) Samantha Reeves	4–6, 6–4, 5–7
Loss	1–2	Jun 2002	ITF Caserta, Italy	50,000	Clay	(Croatia) Maja Palaveršić	(Argentina) Erica Krauth (Brazil) Vanessa Menga	4–6, 4–6
Loss	1–3	Oct 2003	ITF Oporto, Portugal	25,000	Clay	(Czech Republic) Iveta Gerlová	(Austria) Sybille Bammer (Italy) Laura Dell'Angelo	3–6, 5–7
Loss	1–4	May 2004	ITF Raleigh, US	50,000	Clay	(Netherlands) Anouska Van Exel	(United States) Ansley Cargill (Australia) Christina Wheeler	4–6, 4–6
Loss	1–5	May 2005	ITF Lafayette, US	50,000	Clay	(Brazil) Maria Fernanda Alves	(Australia) Beti Sekulovski (Australia) Cindy Watson	6–4, 4–6, 3–6
Loss	1–6	Jun 2005	Open de Marseille, France	50,000	Clay	(Brazil) Maria Fernanda Alves	(Latvia) Līga Dekmeijere (France) Caroline Dhenin	2–6, 6–1, 2–6
Loss	1–7	Oct 2005	Open Nantes Atlantique, France	25,000	Hard (i)	(France) Aurélie Védy	(Czech Republic) Renata Voráčová (France) Mailyne Andrieux	7–6^{(7–3)}, 5–7, 2–6
Win	2–7	Jan 2006	Waikoloa Challenger, US	50,000	Hard	(Chinese Taipei) Chan Chin-wei	(United States) Julie Ditty (United States) Lilia Osterloh	7–5, 4–6, 6–2
Win	3–7	May 2006	Charlottesville Open, US	50,000	Clay	(United States) Sunitha Rao	(Brazil) Maria Fernanda Alves (United States) Lilia Osterloh	6–7^{(6–8)}, 6–2, 6–3
Loss	3–8	May 2006	ITF Indian Harbour Beach, US	50,000	Clay	(Brazil) Maria Fernanda Alves	(Romania) Edina Gallovits (United States) Jessica Kirkland	3–6, 2–6
Loss	3–9	May 2006	ITF Palm Beach Gardens, US	25,000	Clay	(United States) Ansley Cargill	(United States) Angela Haynes (United States) Raquel Kops-Jones	3–6, 3–6
Win	4–9	Jul 2006	ITF Périgueux, France	25,000	Clay	(Australia) Monique Adamczak	(Russia) Nina Bratchikova (Russia) Lioudmila Skavronskaia	6–3, 6–4
Win	5–9	Oct 2006	ITF San Luis Potosí, Mexico	25,000	Hard	(Australia) Monique Adamczak	(Argentina) María José Argeri (Brazil) Carla Tiene	6–7^{(2–7)}, 6–4, 6–4
Loss	5–10	Oct 2006	ITF Saltillo, Mexico	25,000	Hard	(Australia) Monique Adamczak	(Brazil) Larissa Carvalho (Brazil) Joana Cortez	2–6, 5–7
Loss	5–11	Jan 2007	ITF Fort Walton Beach, US	25,000	Hard	(United States) Sunitha Rao	(Germany) Angelika Bachmann (Ukraine) Tetiana Luzhanska	5–7, 7–6^{(9–7)}, 6–7^{(4–7)}
Loss	5–12	Apr 2007	ITF Hammond, US	25,000	Hard	(Serbia) Teodora Mirčić	(Chinese Taipei) Chan Chin-wei (Ukraine) Tetiana Luzhanska	1–6, 6–7^{(3–7)}
Win	6–12	Jun 2007	ITF Galatina, Italy	25,000	Clay	(Czech Republic) Eva Hrdinová	(Italy) Stefania Chieppa (Belarus) Darya Kustova	6–1, 7–6^{(7–4)}
Win	7–12	Jun 2007	ITF Périgueux, France	25,000	Clay	(Czech Republic) Eva Hrdinová	(Ukraine) Yuliya Beygelzimer (Ukraine) Yevgenia Savranska	3–6, 7–5, 6–2
Win	8–12	Aug 2007	Vancouver Open, Canada	50,000	Hard	(Canada) Stéphanie Dubois	(Argentina) Agustina Lepore (Argentina) Soledad Esperón	6–4, 6–4
Win	9–12	Sep 2007	Open Denain, France	75,000	Clay	(Czech Republic) Eva Hrdinová	(Switzerland) Timea Bacsinszky (Poland) Karolina Kosińska	6–4, 6–4
Loss	9–13	Oct 2007	Classic of Troy, US	50,000	Hard	(Czech Republic) Eva Hrdinová	(United States) Angela Haynes (United States) Mashona Washington	4–6, 2–6
Loss	9–14	May 2008	Open de Cagnes-sur-Mer, France	100,000	Clay	(France) Julie Coin	(Romania) Monica Niculescu (Czech Republic) Renata Voráčová	7–6^{(7–2)}, 1–6, [5–10]
Win	10–14	May 2008	Open Saint-Gaudens, France	50,000	Clay	(Chinese Taipei) Hsieh Su-wei	(France) Aurélie Védy (South Africa) Chanelle Scheepers	6–4, 6–0
Loss	10–15	Jun 2008	Internazionale di Roma, Italy	75,000	Clay	(Russia) Alina Jidkova	(Poland) Klaudia Jans (Poland) Alicja Rosolska	3–6, 1–6
Loss	10–16	Sep 2008	Open Denain, France	75,000	Clay	(France) Stéphanie Cohen-Aloro	(Estonia) Maret Ani (Spain) Lourdes Domínguez Lino	0–6, 5–7
Loss	10–17	Oct 2008	ITF Helsinki, Finland	25,000	Hard (i)	(Austria) Patricia Mayr	(Finland) Emma Laine (Sweden) Johanna Larsson	4–6, 2–6
Win	11–17	Oct 2008	Toronto Challenger, Canada	50,000	Hard (i)	(Canada) Stéphanie Dubois	(Czech Republic) Nikola Fraňková (Germany) Carmen Klaschka	6–4, 6–3
Loss	11–18	Apr 2009	ITF Pelham, US	25,000	Clay	(Portugal) Frederica Piedade	(Netherlands) Danielle Harmsen (Netherlands) Kim Kilsdonk	4–6, 7–5, [9–11]
Win	12–18	May 2009	Open de Cagnes-sur-Mer, France	100,000	Clay	(France) Julie Coin	(Georgia (country)) Anna Tatishvili (Argentina) Erica Krauth	6–4, 6–3
Loss	12–19	Aug 2009	Bronx Open, US	100,000	Hard	(France) Julie Coin	(Germany) Anna-Lena Grönefeld (United States) Vania King	0–6, 3–6
Win	13–19	Nov 2009	Internationaux de Poitiers, France	100,000	Hard (i)	(France) Julie Coin	(Poland) Marta Domachowska (Netherlands) Michaëlla Krajicek	6–3, 3–6, [10–3]
Loss	13–20	Nov 2009	Phoenix Tennis Classic, US	50,000	Hard	(Georgia (country)) Anna Tatishvili	(Canada) Sharon Fichman (United States) Mashona Washington	6–4, 4–6, [8–10]
Win	14–20	Oct 2010	ITF Bayamón, Puerto Rico	25,000	Hard	(Brazil) Maria Fernanda Alves	(Argentina) María Irigoyen (Argentina) Florencia Molinero	7–6^{(7–5)}, 6–4
Win	15–20	Apr 2011	ITF Pelham, US	25,000	Clay	(Latvia) Līga Dekmeijere	(United States) Kimberly Couts (Canada) Heidi El Tabakh	2–6, 6–4, [12–10]
Win	16–20	Apr 2011	ITF Jackson, US	25,000	Clay	(Canada) Sharon Fichman	(Czech Republic) Eva Hrdinová (France) Natalie Piquion	7–6^{(7–1)}, 7–6^{(7–3)}
Win	17–20	May 2011	Charlottesville Open, US	50,000	Clay	(Canada) Sharon Fichman	(United States) Julie Ditty (United States) Carly Gullickson	6–3, 6–3
Win	18–20	May 2011	ITF Raleigh, US	50,000	Clay	(Canada) Sharon Fichman	(United States) Beatrice Capra (United States) Asia Muhammad	6–1, 6–3
Loss	18–21	Jun 2011	ITF Boston, US	50,000	Hard	(Canada) Sharon Fichman	(Ukraine) Tetiana Luzhanska (United States) Alexandra Mueller	6–7^{(3–7)}, 3–6
Loss	18–22	Oct 2011	Challenger de Saguenay, Canada	50,000	Hard (i)	(Canada) Gabriela Dabrowski	(Hungary) Tímea Babos (United States) Jessica Pegula	4–6, 3–6
Win	19–22	Nov 2011	Toronto Challenger, Canada	50,000	Hard (i)	(Canada) Gabriela Dabrowski	(Hungary) Tímea Babos (United States) Jessica Pegula	7–5, 6–7^{(5–7)}, [10–4]
Win	20–22	Apr 2012	ITF Pelham, US	25,000	Clay	(France) Julie Coin	(Russia) Elena Bovina (Russia) Ekaterina Bychkova	7–5, 6–4
Loss	20–23	Apr 2012	Dothan Pro Classic, US	50,000	Clay	(Canada) Sharon Fichman	(Canada) Eugenie Bouchard (United States) Jessica Pegula	4–6, 6–4, [5–10]
Loss	20–24	May 2012	ITF Indian Harbour Beach, US	50,000	Clay	(Ukraine) Alyona Sotnikova	(Brazil) Maria Fernanda Alves (Australia) Jessica Moore	7–6^{(8–6)}, 3–6, [8–10]
Win	21–24	May 2012	ITF Raleigh, US	25,000	Clay	(Canada) Gabriela Dabrowski	(United States) Alexandra Mueller (United States) Asia Muhammad	6–4, 4–6, [10–5]
Win	22–24	Jun 2012	ITF Rome, Italy	25,000	Clay	(France) Laura Thorpe	(United States) Julia Cohen (Ukraine) Valentyna Ivakhnenko	6–0, 3–6, [10–8]
Win	23–24	Jul 2012	Colorado International, US	50,000	Hard	(United States) Shelby Rogers	(United States) Lauren Embree (United States) Nicole Gibbs	6–3, 3–6, [12–10]
Win	24–24	Jul 2012	Waterloo Challenger, Canada	50,000	Clay	(Canada) Sharon Fichman	(Japan) Shuko Aoyama (Canada) Gabriela Dabrowski	6–2, 7–5
Win	25–24	Jul 2012	Challenger de Granby, Canada	25,000	Hard	(Canada) Sharon Fichman	(Japan) Shuko Aoyama (Japan) Miki Miyamura	4–6, 7–5, [10–4]
Loss	25–25	Oct 2012	Classic of Troy, US	25,000	Hard	(Canada) Sharon Fichman	(Russia) Angelina Gabueva (Russia) Arina Rodionova	4–6, 4–6
Loss	25–26	Oct 2012	Challenger de Saguenay, Canada	50,000	Hard (i)	(Canada) Sharon Fichman	(Canada) Gabriela Dabrowski (Russia) Alla Kudryavtseva	2–6, 2–6

== Performance timelines ==
Key
W	F	SF	QF	#R	RR	Q#	DNQ	A	NH

(W) winner; (F) finalist; (SF) semifinalist; (QF) quarterfinalist; (#R) rounds 4, 3, 2, 1; (RR) round-robin stage; (Q#) qualification round; (DNQ) did not qualify; (A) absent; (NH) not held; (SR) strike rate (events won / competed); (W–L) win–loss record.

=== Singles ===
Tournament	2000	2001	2002	2003	2004	2005	2006	2007	2008	2009	2010	2011	2012	2013	W–L
Grand Slam tournaments
Australian Open	A	Q2	Q3	Q3	1R	Q3	Q1	A	Q1	A	A	A	A	Q1	0–1
French Open	A	Q3	Q1	Q1	Q1	Q1	A	Q2	Q1	A	A	A	A	A	0–0
Wimbledon	A	Q1	Q1	Q1	Q2	Q2	A	Q1	Q1	A	A	A	A	A	0–0
US Open	Q1	Q1	Q3	Q1	Q1	Q1	A	Q2	Q2	A	A	A	Q2	A	0–0
Win–loss	0–0	0–0	0–0	0–0	0–1	0–0	0–0	0–0	0–0	0–0	0–0	0–0	0–0	0–0	0–1

=== Doubles ===
Tournament	2002	2003	2004	2005	2006	2007	2008	2009	2010	2011	W–L
Grand Slam tournaments
Australian Open	A	A	A	A	A	A	A	A	2R	1R	1–2
French Open	A	A	A	A	A	A	A	A	1R	A	0–1
Wimbledon	Q1	A	A	1R	A	A	Q1	A	1R	A	0–2
US Open	A	A	A	A	A	A	A	2R	1R	A	1–2
Win–loss	0–0	0–0	0–0	0–1	0–0	0–0	0–0	1–1	1–4	0–1	2–7

== Record against top-100 players ==
Pelletier's win–loss record (9–53, 15%) against players who were ranked world No. 100 or higher when played is as follows:
Players who have been ranked world No. 1 are in boldface.

- (China) Li Na 1–0 (Note: has a 1–1 overall record vs. Li)
- (South Africa) Chanelle Scheepers 1–0 (Note: 2–0 overall record vs. Scheepers)
- (United States) Jill Craybas 1–0 (Note: 3–2 overall record vs. Craybas)
- (Russia) Alina Jidkova 1–0 (Note: 1–2 overall record vs. Jidkova)
- (United States) Samantha Reeves 1–0 (Note: 2–3 overall record vs. Reeves)
- (Germany) Julia Schruff 1–0
- (Ukraine) Tatiana Perebiynis 1–0 (Note: 4–0 overall record vs. Perebiynis)
- (France) Stéphanie Foretz 1–2 (Note: 1–4 overall record vs. Foretz)
- (United States) Marissa Irvin 1–4
- **(United States) Lindsay Davenport** 0–1
- **(Serbia) Jelena Janković** 0–1
- (Russia) Nadia Petrova 0–1
- (Italy) Francesca Schiavone 0–1
- (France) Marion Bartoli 0–1 (Note: 0–3 overall record vs. Bartoli)
- (Germany) Sabine Lisicki 0–1
- (Germany) Amy Frazier 0–1
- (Israel) Anna Smashnova 0–1
- (France) Virginie Razzano 0–1
- (Colombia) Fabiola Zuluaga 0–1 (Note: 1–1 overall record vs. Zuluaga)
- (United States) Alexandra Stevenson 0–1 (Note: 1–1 overall record vs. Stevenson)
- (Spain) Magüi Serna 0–1
- (Czech Republic) Barbora Strýcová 0–1
- (Czech Republic) Klára Koukalová 0–1
- (Czech Republic) Iveta Benešová 0–1
- (Czech Republic) Petra Cetkovská 0–1 (Note: 0–3 overall record vs. Cetkovská)
- (Austria) Tamira Paszek 0–1
- (Venezuela) María Vento-Kabchi 0–1 (Note: 1–1 overall record vs. Vento-Kabchi)
- (Puerto Rico) Kristina Brandi 0–1 (Note: 0–2 overall record vs. Brandi)
- (India) Sania Mirza 0–1
- (United States) Laura Granville 0–1
- (United States) Rachel McQuillan 0–1 (Note: 0–2 overall record vs. McQuillan)
- (Hungary) Petra Mandula 0–1
- (Spain) María Sánchez Lorenzo 0–1
- (Switzerland) Marie-Gaïané Mikaelian 0–1
- (Germany) Marlene Weingärtner 0–1
- (Hungary) Melinda Czink 0–1
- (Poland) Marta Domachowska 0–1 (Note: 1–1 overall record vs. Domachowska)
- (Slovakia) Martina Suchá 0–1
- (United States) Ashley Harkleroad 0–1
- (United States) Shenay Perry 0–1 (Note: 1–4 overall record vs. Perry)
- (Japan) Akiko Morigami 0–1 (Note: 1–1 overall record vs. Morigami)
- (Belgium) Els Callens 0–1 (Note: 0–2 overall record vs. Callens)
- (Czech Republic) Adriana Gerši 0–1
- (United States) Jennifer Hopkins 0–1 (Note: 1–2 overall record vs. Hopkins)
- (Australia) Anastasia Rodionova 0–1 (Note: 1–3 overall record vs. Rodionova)
- (Ukraine) Yuliana Fedak 0–1
- (Canada) Jana Nejedly 0–1
- (Hungary) Zsófia Gubacsi 0–1
- (France) Séverine Beltrame 0–2 (Note: 0–3 overall record vs. Beltrame)
- (Spain) Nuria Llagostera Vives 0–2 (Note: 0–4 overall record vs. Llagostera Vives)
- (Belarus) Tatiana Poutchek 0–2
- (Kazakhstan) Irina Selyutina 0–2 (Note: 0–3 overall record vs. Selyutina)
