= Nicole Gibbs =

American tennis player (born 1993)

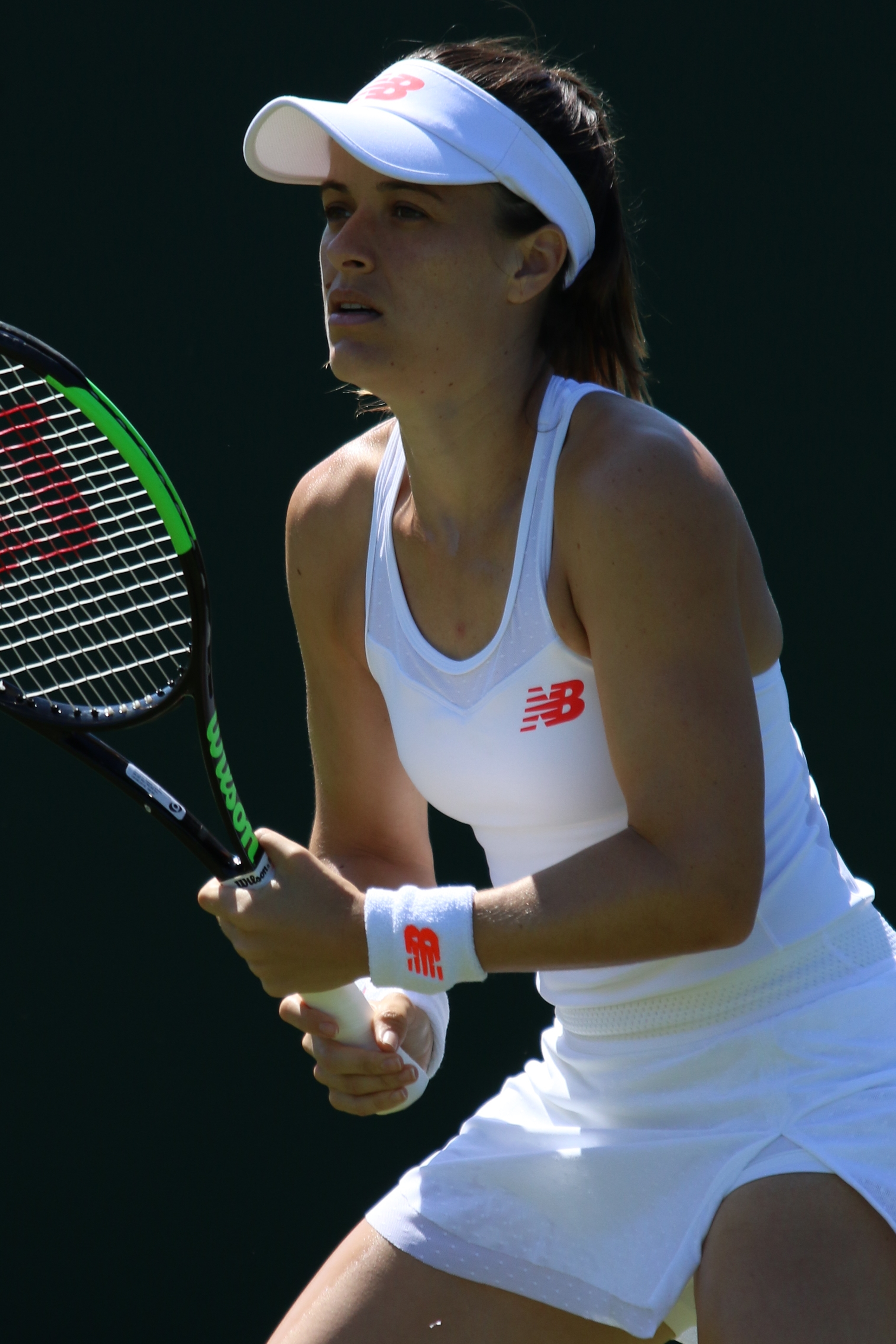
- Gibbs at the 2018 Wimbledon qualifying
- Country (sports): United States
- Born: March 3, 1993 (age 33) Cincinnati, Ohio, U.S.
- Height: 5 ft 6 in (1.68 m)
- Turned pro: 2013
- Retired: February 2021
- Plays: Right-handed (two-handed backhand)
- College: Stanford University
- Coach: Paul Gibbs
- Prize money: $1,839,720

Singles
- Career record: 303–221
- Career titles: 7 ITF
- Highest ranking: No. 68 (July 25, 2016)

Grand Slam singles results
- Australian Open: 3R (2017)
- French Open: 1R (2015, 2016)
- Wimbledon: 1R (2015, 2016)
- US Open: 3R (2014)

Doubles
- Career record: 62–70
- Career titles: 5 ITF
- Highest ranking: No. 107 (September 19, 2016)

Grand Slam doubles results
- Australian Open: 1R (2017)
- French Open: 1R (2016)
- Wimbledon: 1R (2016)
- US Open: 3R (2016)

Grand Slam mixed doubles results
- US Open: QF (2016)

Nicole Gibbs (born March 3, 1993) is an American former professional tennis player.

She won seven singles and five doubles titles on the ITF Women's Circuit. On 25 July 2016, she reached her best singles ranking of world No. 68. On 19 September 2016, she peaked at No. 107 in the WTA doubles rankings.

Gibbs graduated in 2010 from Crossroads School in Santa Monica, California, and from Stanford University in 2014.

== Career ==
=== College ===
Gibbs was the top player in both singles and doubles for the Stanford women's team.

As a collegiate sophomore, Gibbs was named 2012 recipient of the Honda Sports Award for tennis. Her selection by the Collegiate Women Sports Awards program recognized Gibbs as the country's top junior female player in her sport.

A 2012 All-American in both singles and doubles, Gibbs, as a sophomore, pulled off a historic sweep of the year's NCAA singles and doubles titles. Gibbs joined Stanford's Linda Gates (1985) and UCLA's Keri Phebus (1995) as only the third player in NCAA history to capture both NCAA titles in the same season. Gibbs then repeated as NCAA singles champion the following year, before forgoing her senior year. Traditionally, the winner of the NCAA title is offered a wild card into the US Open, if American.

Gibbs defeated teammate Mallory Burdette in the first all-Stanford singles final since 2011, claiming the 15th collegiate singles crown (13 NCAA, 2 AIAW) in school history. One hour later, Gibbs and Burdette shook off physical and emotional fatigue to claim the doubles championship with victory over Georgia's Nadja Gilchrist and Chelsey Gullickson.

The championship matches represented a historic day for the Stanford women's tennis program. It was the first time in NCAA men's or women's tennis history that teammates squared off in the singles final before later pairing up in the doubles title match.

The 2012 Pac-12 Player of the Year, Gibbs was also named an All-Pac-12 First Team selection. She finished the year 41–5 overall and 21–2 in duals while playing all her matches at the number one spot. Closing out the year on a 17-match winning streak, Gibbs pocketed two other singles titles along the way, winning the ITA Northwest Regional Championships in October and Pac-12 Championships in April. Gibbs was ousted from the Mercury Insurance Open, where she lost to Varvara Lepchenko.

Gibbs was inducted into the Stanford Athletics Hall of Fame in 2023.

The Honda Sports Award is presented annually to the top women athletes in 12 NCAA-sanctioned sports. As a Honda prize recipient, Gibbs becomes a finalist for the Collegiate Woman Athlete of the Year and the prestigious Honda Cup. Gibbs was chosen by a vote of coaches from 1,000 NCAA member schools. Finalists included Burdette (Stanford), Beatrice Capra (Duke) and Allie Will (Florida).

== Professional ==
Gibbs has played in a number of WTA Premier qualifiers, the 2009 LA Open and the 2010 and 2011 Stanford Open qualifiers, where she won a round each year, the 2012 Western & Southern Open losing in the first round, and the 2012 New Haven Open at Yale where she won three rounds to qualify, and then won a round in the main draw before losing in the second to Petra Kvitová. She has also played in qualifying for the US Open on three occasions (2009, 2010, 2011), winning a round in 2010.

In addition to qualifying for the main draw in New Haven, Gibbs played in the three Premier event main draws in 2012, the Stanford Classic, winning one round before losing to newly crowned Wimbledon champion Serena Williams, and the US Open where she lost in the first round to Alizé Cornet.

Gibbs played the 2010 US Open – Mixed doubles with Sam Querrey as her partner and the 2011 US Open – Women's doubles with Lauren Davis. She was a hitting partner as part of the 2009 United States Fed Cup team in Italy.

Gibbs won her first Grand Slam main-draw matches at the 2014 US Open. She upset 23rd seed Anastasia Pavlyuchenkova in the second round, before falling to another seed, Flavia Pennetta, in the third round. Gibbs won her first Australia Open main-draw match in 2015, reaching the second round.

In 2015, she played for the Austin Aces World TeamTennis (WTT) team. Gibbs remained with the team in 2016, when it relocated and was renamed the Orange County Breakers. She was named WTT Female Most Valuable Player after tying for first in the league with teammate Alla Kudryavtseva in winning percentage in women's doubles and also finishing second in women's singles.

In May 2019, after a routine dental visit, Gibbs' dentist noticed a small growth on the roof of her mouth, which later turned out to be microcystic adnexal carcinoma, a very rare form of sweat gland cancer. She later became cancer–free and resumed playing tennis. On February 15, 2021, Gibbs announced on social media that she would be retiring from professional tennis.

== Grand Slam performance timelines ==
Key
W	F	SF	QF	#R	RR	Q#	DNQ	A	NH

(W) winner; (F) finalist; (SF) semifinalist; (QF) quarterfinalist; (#R) rounds 4, 3, 2, 1; (RR) round-robin stage; (Q#) qualification round; (DNQ) did not qualify; (A) absent; (NH) not held; (SR) strike rate (events won / competed); (W–L) win–loss record.

=== Singles ===
Tournament	2009	2010	2011	2012	2013	2014	2015	2016	2017	2018	2019	2020	SR	W–L
Australian Open	A	A	A	A	Q2	Q2	2R	2R	3R	2R	A	Q2	0 / 4	5–4
French Open	A	A	A	A	A	Q1	1R	1R	Q3	Q2	A	A	0 / 2	0–2
Wimbledon	A	A	A	A	Q1	Q3	1R	1R	A	Q3	A	A	0 / 2	0–2
US Open	Q1	Q2	Q1	1R	1R	3R	2R	2R	2R	1R	1R	A	0 / 8	5–8
Win–loss	0–0	0–0	0–0	0–1	0–1	2–1	2–4	2–4	3–2	1–2	0–1	0–0	0 / 16	10–16

=== Doubles ===
Tournament	2011	2012	2013	2014	2015	2016	2017	2018	2019	2020	SR	W–L
Australian Open	A	A	A	A	A	A	1R	A	A	A	0 / 1	0–1
French Open	A	A	A	A	A	1R	A	A	A	A	0 / 1	0–1
Wimbledon	A	A	A	A	A	1R	A	A	A	A	0 / 1	0–1
US Open	1R	A	A	1R	2R	3R	2R	2R	A	A	0 / 6	5–6
Win–loss	0–1	0–0	0–0	0–1	1–1	2–3	1–2	1–1	0–0	0–0	0 / 9	5–9

== WTA Challenger finals ==
=== Singles: 1 (runner-up) ===
Result	W–L	Date	Tournament	Surface	Opponent	Score
Loss	0–1	Nov 2015	Carlsbad Classic, United States	Hard	(Belgium) Yanina Wickmayer	3–6, 6–7^{(4)}

=== Doubles: 1 (runner-up) ===
Result	W–L	Date	Tournament	Surface	Partner	Opponents	Score
Loss	0–1	Nov 2016	Hawaii Open, United States	Hard	(United States) Asia Muhammad	(Japan) Eri Hozumi (Japan) Miyu Kato	7–6^{(3)}, 3–6, [8–10]

== ITF Circuit finals ==
=== Singles: 18 (7 titles, 11 runner–ups) ===
Legend $80,000 tournaments $50/60,000 tournaments $25,000 tournaments $10,000 tournaments	Finals by surface Hard (6–8) Clay (1–3)

Result	W–L	Date	Tournament	Tier	Surface	Opponent	Score
Win	1–0	Nov 2007	ITF Mexico City	10,000	Hard	(Bolivia) María Fernanda Álvarez Terán	7–5, 6–3
Loss	1–1	Jun 2011	ITF Buffalo, United States	10,000	Clay	(United States) Lauren Davis	7–5, 2–6, 4–6
Win	2–1	Jul 2012	Colorado International, United States	50,000	Hard	(France) Julie Coin	6–2, 3–6, 6–4
Loss	2–2	Feb 2013	Rancho Santa Fe Open, United States	25,000	Hard	(United States) Madison Brengle	1–6, 4–6
Win	3–2	Jul 2013	Yakima Challenger, United States	50,000	Hard	(Croatia) Ivana Lisjak	6–1, 6–4
Loss	3–3	Mar 2014	Innisbrook Open, United States	25,000	Clay	(United States) Grace Min	5–7, 0–6
Win	4–3	Jul 2014	Carson Challenger, United States	50,000	Hard	(United States) Melanie Oudin	6–4, 6–4
Loss	4–4	Jul 2014	Lexington Challenger, United States	50,000	Hard	(United States) Madison Brengle	3–6, 4–6
Loss	4–5	Oct 2015	Kirkland Challenger, United States	50,000	Hard	(Luxembourg) Mandy Minella	6–2, 5–7, 2–6
Loss	4–6	Nov 2015	Waco Showdown, United States	50,000	Hard	(Switzerland) Viktorija Golubic	2–6, 1–6
Win	5–6	Jun 2017	ITF Baton Rouge, United States	25,000	Hard	(United States) Francesca Di Lorenzo	6–3, 6–3
Loss	5–7	Jul 2017	ITF Auburn, United States	25,000	Hard	(Japan) Miharu Imanishi	3–6, 2–6
Win	6–7	Jun 2018	ITF Naples, United States	25,000	Clay	(United States) Ashley Kratzer	6–4, 6–4
Loss	6–8	Jul 2018	Berkeley Club Challenge, United States	60,000	Hard	(United States) Sofia Kenin	0–6, 4–6
Loss	6–9	Nov 2018	Las Vegas Open, United States	80,000	Hard	(Switzerland) Belinda Bencic	5–7, 1–6
Win	7–9	Feb 2019	Rancho Santa Fe Open, United States	25,000	Hard	(United States) Kristie Ahn	6–3, 6–3
Loss	7–10	Apr 2019	ITF Palm Harbor, United States	80,000	Clay	(Czech Republic) Barbora Krejčíková	0–6, 1–6
Loss	7–11	Jul 2019	Championships of Honolulu, United States	60,000	Hard	(United States) Usue Maitane Arconada	0–6, 2–6

=== Doubles: 7 (5 titles, 2 runner–ups) ===
Legend $80,000 tournaments $50/60,000 tournaments	Finals by surface Hard (4–1) Clay (1–1)

Result	W–L	Date	Tournament	Tier	Surface	Partner	Opponents	Score
Win	1–0	May 2010	Raleigh Challenger, United States	50,000	Clay	(United States) Kristie Ahn	(United States) Alexandra Mueller (United States) Ahsha Rolle	6–3, 6–2
Loss	1–1	Jul 2012	Colorado International, United States	50,000	Hard	(United States) Lauren Embree	(Canada) Marie-Ève Pelletier (United States) Shelby Rogers	3–6, 6–3, [10–12]
Loss	1–2	Apr 2013	Charlottesville Open, United States	50,000	Clay	(United States) Shelby Rogers	(United Kingdom) Nicola Slater (United States) CoCo Vandeweghe	3–6, 6–7^{(4)}
Win	2–2	Oct 2015	Las Vegas Open, United States	50,000	Hard	(United States) Julia Boserup	(Brazil) Paula Cristina Gonçalves (United States) Sanaz Marand	6–3, 6–4
Win	3–2	Nov 2015	Waco Showdown, United States	50,000	Hard	(United States) Vania King	(Israel) Julia Glushko (Sweden) Rebecca Peterson	6–4, 6–4
Win	4–2	Jul 2018	Berkeley Club Challenge, United States	60,000	Hard	(United States) Asia Muhammad	(Australia) Ellen Perez (United States) Sabrina Santamaria	6–4, 6–1
Win	5–2	Nov 2018	Tyler Pro Challenge, United States	80,000	Hard	(United States) Asia Muhammad	(United States) Desirae Krawczyk (Mexico) Giuliana Olmos	3–6, 6–3, [14–12]
