= Alyona Sotnikova =

Ukrainian tennis player

Alyona Sotnikova Альона Сотникова
- Country (sports): Ukraine
- Born: 5 May 1992 (age 34) Kharkiv
- Height: 1.70 m (5 ft 7 in)
- Plays: Right (two-handed backhand)
- Prize money: $91,002

Singles
- Career record: 236–156
- Career titles: 8 ITF
- Highest ranking: No. 315 (27 July 2015)

Doubles
- Career record: 179–106
- Career titles: 24 ITF
- Highest ranking: No. 237 (1 October 2012)

Alyona Ihorivna Sotnikova (Ukrainian: Альона Ігорівна Сотникова; born 5 May 1992) is a Ukrainian former tennis player. She achieved career-high WTA rankings of 315 in singles and 237 in doubles.

== ITF Circuit finals ==
=== Singles: 13 (8 titles, 5 runner-ups) ===
Legend $25,000 tournaments $10,000 tournaments	Finals by surface Hard (5–3) Clay (3–2)

Result	No.	Date	Tournament	Surface	Opponent	Score
Win	1.	Sep 2008	ITF Sofia, Bulgaria	Clay	(Hungary) Réka Luca Jani	6–2, 4–6, 6–3
Win	2.	Oct 2013	ITF Dubrovnik, Croatia	Clay	(Russia) Olga Doroshina	7–6^{(6)}, 4–6, 7–6^{(5)}
Win	3.	Dec 2013	ITF Antalya, Turkey	Clay	(Moldova) Anastasia Vdovenco	6–0, 7–6^{(2)}
Loss	1.	Dec 2013	ITF Antalya, Turkey	Clay	(Russia) Natela Dzalamidze	6–2, 6–7^{(5)}, 3–6
Loss	2.	Feb 2014	ITF Antalya, Turkey	Clay	(Romania) Patricia Maria Tig	7–5, 1–6, 3–6
Loss	3.	May 2014	ITF Antalya, Turkey	Hard	(Mexico) Marcela Zacarías	3–6, ret.
Win	4.	Aug 2014	ITF Astana, Kazakhstan	Hard	(Ukraine) Anna Shkudun	5–7, 6–4, 6–1
Win	5.	Aug 2014	ITF Astana, Kazakhstan	Hard	(Ukraine) Anna Shkudun	6–4, 6–0
Win	6.	Mar 2015	ITF Antalya, Turkey	Hard	(Austria) Barbara Haas	6–3, 6–3
Win	7.	Apr 2015	ITF Antalya, Turkey	Hard	(France) Caroline Romeo	6–3, 6–1
Loss	4.	May 2015	ITF Antalya, Turkey	Hard	(Slovakia) Viktória Kužmová	3–6, 6–7^{(5)}
Loss	5.	Jun 2016	ITF Antalya, Turkey	Hard	(France) Jennifer Zerbone	3–6, 7–5, 6–7^{(4)}
Win	8.	Jul 2016	President's Cup, Kazakhstan	Hard	(Russia) Veronika Kudermetova	6–2, 6–3

=== Doubles: 37 (24 titles, 13 runner-ups) ===
Legend $50,000 tournaments $25,000 tournaments $15,000 tournaments $10,000 tournaments	Finals by surface Hard (10–7) Clay (14–6)

Result	No.	Date	Tournament	Surface	Partner	Opponents	Score
Loss	1.	29 September 2008	ITF Sandanski, Bulgaria	Clay	(Romania) Elena Bogdan	(Romania) Laura Ioana Andrei (Poland) Sylwia Zagórska	3–6, 1–6
Win	2.	9 March 2009	ITF Giza, Egypt	Clay	(Russia) Galina Fokina	(Poland) Sandra Zaniewska (Netherlands) Bibiane Schoofs	6–4, 3–6, [10–8]
Win	3.	15 March 2010	ITF St. Petersburg, Russia	Hard (i)	(Ukraine) Maryna Zanevska	(Russia) Alexandra Panova (Russia) Eugeniya Pashkova	7–5, 6–3
Loss	4.	23 July 2010	ITF Kharkiv, Ukraine	Clay	(Ukraine) Valentyna Ivakhnenko	(Ukraine) Kateryna Kozlova (Ukraine) Elina Svitolina	3–6, 5–7
Win	5.	2 May 2011	ITF Indian Harbor Beach, US	Clay	(Slovakia) Lenka Wienerová	(United States) Christina Fusano (United States) Alexa Glatch	6–4, 6–3
Win	6.	6 June 2011	ITF El Paso, US	Hard	(United States) Chiara Scholl	(United States) Amanda Fink (United States) Yasmin Schnack	7–5, 4–6, 6–4
Win	7.	12 March 2012	ITF Clearwater, US	Hard	(Georgia (country)) Ekaterine Gorgodze	(United Kingdom) Naomi Broady (United Kingdom) Heather Watson	6–3, 6–2
Loss	8.	6 May 2012	ITF Indian Harbor Beach, US	Clay	(Canada) Marie-Ève Pelletier	(Brazil) Maria Fernanda Alves (Australia) Jessica Moore	7–6^{(6)}, 3–6, [8–10]
Win	9.	17 September 2012	Open de Saint-Malo, France	Clay	(Turkey) Pemra Özgen	(Bulgaria) Aleksandrina Naydenova (Brazil) Teliana Pereira	6–4, 7–6^{(6)}
Win	10.	2 June 2013	ITF Qarshi, Uzbekistan	Hard	(Uzbekistan) Albina Khabibulina	(Uzbekistan) Sabina Sharipova (Russia) Ekaterina Yashina	7–5, 6–3
Win	11.	2 September 2013	ITF Moscow, Russia	Clay	(Ukraine) Anna Shkudun	(Ukraine) Olga Ianchuk (Estonia) Anett Kontaveit	6–3, 6–4
Loss	12.	23 September 2013	ITF Clermont-Ferrand, France	Hard (i)	(Russia) Margarita Gasparyan	(Netherlands) Michaëlla Krajicek (Poland) Marta Domachowska	7–5, 4–6, [8–10]
Loss	13.	4 November 2013	ITF Umag, Croatia	Clay	(Italy) Giulia Sussarello	(Hungary) Agnes Bukta (Slovakia) Vivien Juhászová	4–6, 0–6
Win	14.	27 January 2014	ITF Antalya, Turkey	Clay	(Belarus) Sviatlana Pirazhenka	(Romania) Irina Bara (Romania) Diana Buzean	7–5, 1–6, [10–7]
Win	15.	3 February 2014	ITF Antalya, Turkey	Clay	(Bosnia and Herzegovina) Anita Husarić	(Romania) Laura Ioana Andrei (Belarus) Sviatlana Pirazhenka	5–7, 6–4, [10–6]
Win	16.	28 February 2014	ITF Bron, France	Hard (i)	(Bulgaria) Isabella Shinikova	(Germany) Anna Klasen (Philippines) Katharina Lehnert	5–7, 7–6^{(5)}, [10–5]
Win	17.	7 March 2014	ITF Amiens, France	Clay (i)	(Bulgaria) Isabella Shinikova	(Italy) Angelica Moratelli (Italy) Anna Remondina	6–1, 6–4
Win	18.	21 March 2014	ITF Le Havre, France	Clay (i)	(Bulgaria) Isabella Shinikova	(Netherlands) Bernice van de Velde (Netherlands) Kelly Versteeg	6–4, 6–3
Loss	19.	20 October 2014	ITF Phuket, Thailand	Hard (i)	(Ukraine) Oleksandra Korashvili	(Thailand) Nicha Lertpitaksinchai (Thailand) Peangtarn Plipuech	6–7^{(0)}, 6–2, [4–10]
Loss	20.	15 February 2015	ITF Antalya, Turkey	Clay	(Sweden) Cornelia Lister	(Georgia (country)) Ekaterine Gorgodze (Russia) Victoria Kan	1–6, 0–6
Loss	21.	16 March 2015	ITF Antalya, Turkey	Hard	(Kazakhstan) Kamila Kerimbayeva	(Romania) Cristina Ene (Romania) Ioana Loredana Roșca	2–6, 3–6
Win	22.	30 March 2015	ITF Antalya, Turkey	Hard	(China) Lu Jiajing	(Italy) Martina Caciotti (Italy) Maria Masini	6–2, 6–0
Win	23.	4 May 2015	ITF Antalya, Turkey	Hard	(Bosnia and Herzegovina) Anita Husarić	(Romania) Nicoleta Dascălu (Italy) Camilla Rosatello	6–1, 6–2
Win	24.	31 May 2015	ITF Moscow, Russia	Clay	(Germany) Carolin Daniels	(Ukraine) Olga Ianchuk (Russia) Daria Kasatkina	6–2, 7–6^{(10)}
Win	25.	22 June 2015	ITF Breda, Netherlands	Clay	(Belarus) Sviatlana Pirazhenka	(Austria) Barbara Haas (Austria) Pia König	6–3, 6–1
Loss	26.	29 June 2015	ITF Zeeland, Netherlands	Clay	(Switzerland) Conny Perrin	(Netherlands) Lesley Kerkhove (Netherlands) Quirine Lemoine	2–6, 6–3, [3–10]
Win	27.	13 July 2015	ITF Aschaffenburg, Germany	Clay	(Latvia) Diāna Marcinkēviča	(Ukraine) Alona Fomina (Ukraine) Sofiya Kovalets	3–6, 6–4, [10–5]
Loss	28.	10 August 2015	ITF Westende, Belgium	Hard	(India) Ankita Raina	(Netherlands) Indy de Vroome (Netherlands) Lesley Kerkhove	6–7^{(4)}, 4–6
Win	29.	30 November 2015	ITF Antalya, Turkey	Clay	(Germany) Christina Shakovets	(Ukraine) Alona Fomina (Georgia (country)) Sofia Kvatsabaia	7–5, 6–4
Win	30.	21 February 2016	ITF Palma Nova, Spain	Clay	(Russia) Valeria Savinykh	(United Kingdom) Amanda Carreras (Italy) Alice Savoretti	2–6, 6–4, [10–6]
Win	31.	4 March 2016	ITF Tarragona, Spain	Clay	(Romania) Irina Bara	(Spain) Georgina García Pérez (Spain) Olga Sáez Larra	7–5, 3–6, [10–8]
Win	32.	4 April 2016	ITF Heraklion, Greece	Hard	(Russia) Victoria Kan	(Uzbekistan) Vlada Ekshibarova (Austria) Janina Toljan	6–1, 6–2
Loss	33.	23 April 2016	ITF Heraklion, Greece	Hard	(Russia) Valeria Savinykh	(United Kingdom) Freya Christie (South Africa) Chanel Simmonds	4–6, 0–6
Win	34.	30 April 2016	ITF Heraklion, Greece	Hard	(Russia) Valeria Savinykh	(Russia) Kseniia Bekker (Russia) Alina Silich	4–6, 6–4, [10–7]
Win	35.	20 June 2016	ITF Antalya, Turkey	Hard	(France) Caroline Romeo	(Croatia) Mariana Drazic (Russia) Daria Lodikova	6–3, 6–3
Loss	36.	27 June 2016	ITF Antalya, Turkey	Hard	(Israel) Vlada Ekshibarova	(Turkey) Melis Sezer (Montenegro) Ana Veselinović	3–6, 4–6
Loss	37.	18 July 2016	ITF Astana, Kazakhstan	Hard	(Belarus) Sviatlana Pirazhenka	(Russia) Anastasia Frolova (Russia) Angelina Gabueva	2–6, 3–6
