= Grace Min =

American tennis player

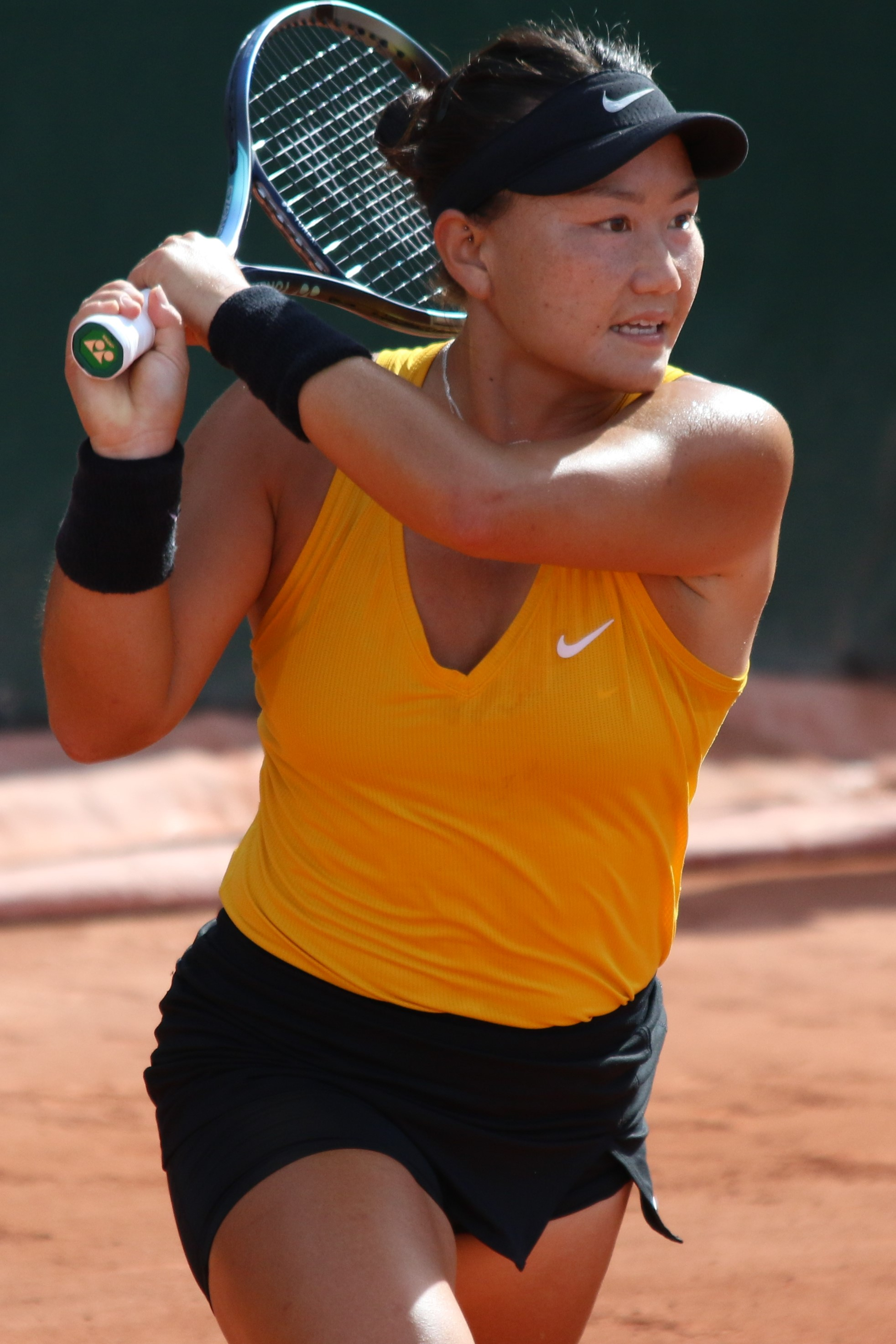
- Min in the 2022 French Open
- Country (sports): United States
- Residence: Lake Nona, Florida
- Born: May 6, 1994 (age 32) Atlanta, Georgia
- Height: 1.63 m (5 ft 4 in)
- Turned pro: 2008
- Plays: Right (two-handed backhand)
- Prize money: $936,313

Singles
- Career record: 373–292
- Career titles: 12 ITF
- Highest ranking: No. 97 (March 2, 2015)

Grand Slam singles results
- Australian Open: 1R (2015)
- French Open: 1R (2013, 2014, 2018)
- Wimbledon: Q3 (2013)
- US Open: 1R (2013, 2014)

Doubles
- Career record: 36–51
- Career titles: 1 ITF
- Highest ranking: No. 308 (September 17, 2012)

Grand Slam doubles results
- US Open: 1R (2010, 2012, 2013, 2014)

Grand Slam mixed doubles results
- US Open: 1R (2012)

Grace Min (born May 6, 1994) is an American inactive tennis player. She has a career-high singles ranking of world No. 97, achieved on 2 March 2015, and she peaked at No. 308 in the doubles rankings on 17 September 2012. Min won the 2011 US Open girls' singles title. She also won the 2011 Wimbledon girls' doubles title with Eugenie Bouchard.

== Tennis career ==
=== 2006–07 ===
Her first tournament was the Eddie Herr International Junior Tennis Championships, an under-14 tournament at the Bollettieri Sports Academy. Aged 12 and seeded tenth, Grace received a bye into the second round, where she was defeated by Nataliya Pintusova, 6–3, 6–4. Her next tournament was the Prince Cup in Miami, Florida. In the first round, she defeated tenth seed Melina Ferrero, for her first victory of the year. She then fell to qualifier Laurie Gingras in the second round, in straight sets. Her final tournament of the year was the Junior Orange Bowl in Coral Gables, Florida. In the first round, she crushed German Sarah Ott 6–1, 6–0, and backed it up by another straight-sets victory over qualifier Yuki Kristina Chiang, 6–1, 6–2. Next, she defeated Donna Vekić 6–0, 6–1, but was defeated by Chanelle van Nguyen, 6–3, 6–1 in the fourth round.

The first tournament of the year was an under-14 tournament in Bolton, England, but Grace lost in the second round to ninth seed Nastja Kolar, 6–2, 6–3. She then headed to Tarbes, France, where she was awarded a wildcard for the qualifying draw of the Petits As. She qualified for the tournament, defeating Eugenie Prince, Manon Peral and Marine Even all in straight sets to qualify. She reached the semifinals of the tournament before her unexpected run was cut short by top-seeded Anna Orlik, in two sets. Her success in the tournament greatly improved her ranking.

Grace then played the USTA National Open and the Easter Bowl, losing in the first round of the former and the quarterfinals of the latter. She then headed to Waco, Texas for the ITF Spring Circuit, where she lost in the third round to tenth-seed Hsu Chieh-yu, 1–6, 3–6.

She won the USTA National Open in Marietta, Georgia, defeating compatriot Carolyn Chupa, Amelia Martinez and top seed Courtney Griffith to reach the quarterfinals, where she overcame Alina Jerjomina, in three sets. In the semifinals, she played another tough match against Rachel Kahan, eventually prevailing in three sets. In the final, she defeated Elizabeth Begley 6–0, 6–1. She then won the Peach State Classic in Norcross, Georgia without dropping a set.

She then played the U.S. Junior Grass Court Championships in Philadelphia, losing in the first round. Following this loss, she headed to Georgia to play the under-18 USTA National Open in Stone Mountain, losing in the quarterfinals. Grace rebounded, winning two titles back to back, the National Claycourt Championships in Plantation, Florida and the National Hardcourt Championships in Peachtree City, Georgia. These were the last tournaments Grace won that year. From August to December, she played five under-18 tournaments, two under-16 tournaments and one under-14 event, her best result being a quarterfinals appearance at the Dunlop Orange Bowl.

=== 2008–11 ===
Grace started the year at the Eastbourne International where she defeated Morven McCuloch, Patricia Martins, Léolia Jeanjean and second seed Irina Khromacheva to reach the final, where she was defeated by Polina Leykina, 6–2, 6–2. Her next tournament was Les Petits As, where she lost in the third round to Jessica Ren, and was unable to defend her points from the previous year. She then fell in the first round of the USTA National Open to eventual champion, Danielle Collins, in straight sets. She also suffered two more first round exit at the USTA International Spring Championships and the Easter Bowl ITF.

In May, Grace played her first professional tournament at a $25k event in Raleigh, North Carolina. She crushed Sianna Simmons in the first round of qualifying 6–2, 6–1 but was eliminated from the tournament by Hsu Chieh-yu in the second round. She then lost in the second round of the USTA National Open in Norcross, Georgia.

Grace then qualified for her first ITF women's main draw at a $10k event in Sumter, South Carolina. In the first round, she crushed fellow qualifier Eugenie Bouchard 6–0, 6–3 but lost to fifth seed Anna Wishink, in the second round.

Grace played two more $10k events in the United States, losing during the qualifying of both. She then won her first title of the year at the under 18 USTA National Open in her hometown, dropping only one set in the tournament. Grace then lost in the quarterfinals of the under 18 National Clay Court Championships and the second round of the US International Hardcort Championships.

Grace was then awarded a wildcard for the junior US Open, her first Grand Slam championship. However, she was defeated in the first round of qualifying by Heather Watson, 7–5, 6–0. Following this loss, she headed to Lexington for the Under-18 Kentucky International Junior Tennis Derby, where she qualified for the main draw, but was eliminated in the first round by Michaela Boev, 6–2, 6–0. She then fell in the third round of the USTA ITF Junior Circuit – Georgia in Atlanta to Elizabeth Begley, in two sets.

Grace then received a wildcard for the main draw of a $50k event in Lawrenceville, Georgia. In the first round, she overcame countrymaid Julia Cohen in three sets. However, she was crushed by sixth seed Angela Haynes, 6–0, 6–1 in the second round. With these professional tournaments, she established her first WTA ranking. She lost in the second round of an under-18 tournament in South Carolina, before reaching a final in Florida. She then fell in the first round of the Eddie Herr International Junior Tennis Championships as a wildcard to sixth seed Yana Buchina of Russia, in a three-setter. Grace's final tournament of the year was the Dunlop Orange Bowl, where she managed to defend her points by reaching the quarterfinals.

=== 2012–15 ===
In 2012, she won her first ITF Circuit title at $25k Innisbrook, Florida in January, as a qualifier, she won seven matches in a row, defeating Catalina Castaño, Lauren Davis and Gail Brodsky.

Grace reached another final at $25k Clearwater, Florida in March, where she defeated world No. 65, Anastasiya Yakimova, in the quarterfinals but lost the final to Garbiñe Muguruza.

She won her second ITF Circuit title at the $50k Indian Harbour Beach, Florida defeating top-seed and world No. 97, Irina Falconi, in the first round, Krista Hardebeck in the semifinals, and defeated Maria Sanchez, in straight sets.

At the 2014 French Open, Grace was 20th seed in the women's singles qualifying draw and won three matches to enter the main competition. In the first round, she lost to Garbiñe Muguruza, in straight sets.

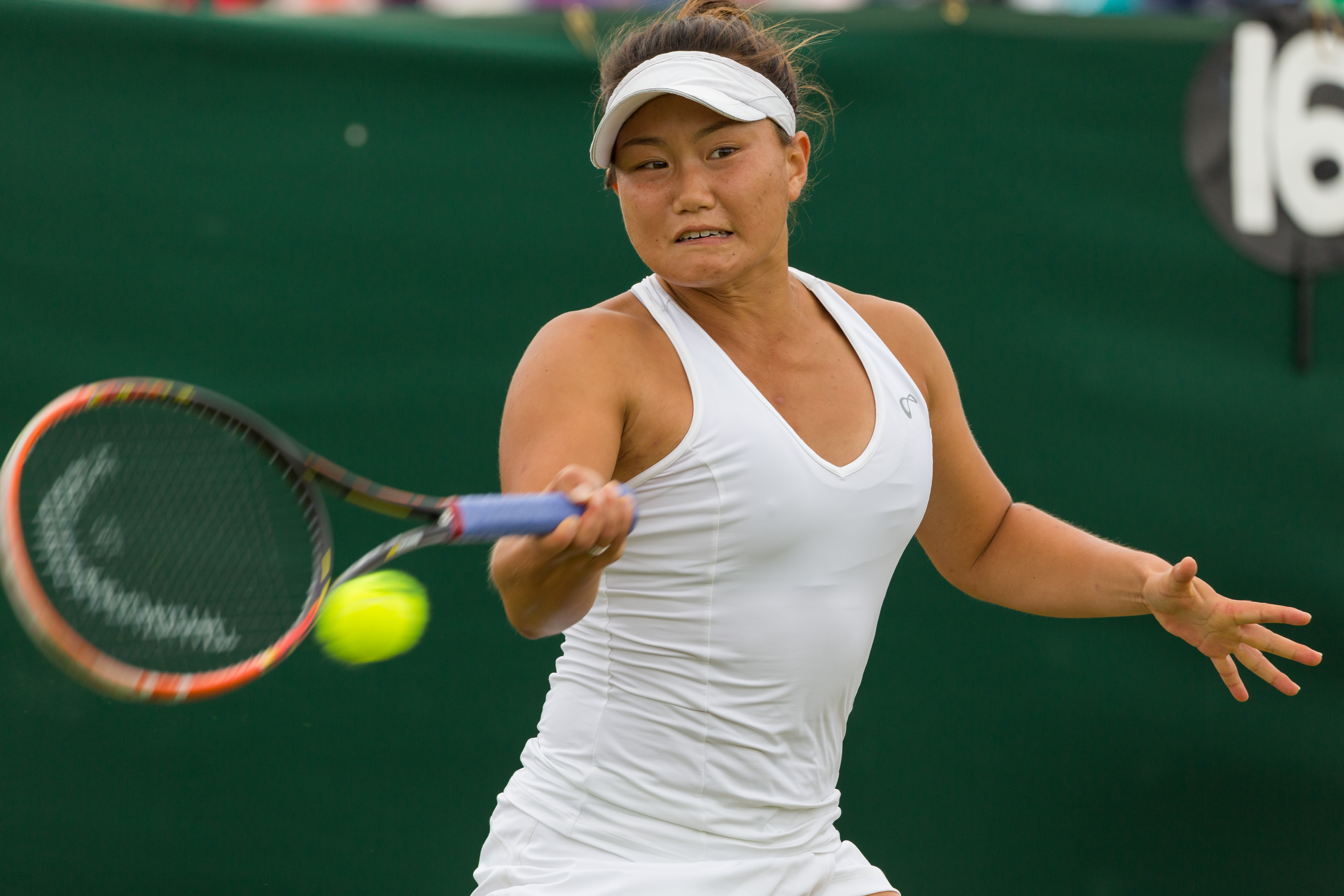
Grace during the 2015 Wimbledon singles qualifying

In January 2015, Min entered the Auckland Open and Hobart International tournaments but lost in the qualifying first round in both. Then also in January at the Australian Open, she was unseeded playing in the women's singles main draw for the first time and lost to 14th seed Sara Errani, 1–6, 0–6.

On 3 February 2015, Min was ranked in the top 100 in singles for the first time at No. 100, making her the 14th highest ranked American player.

=== 2023: Guadalajara debut ===
She made her debut at the WTA 1000 in Guadalajara, after qualifying for the main draw where she lost to Anhelina Kalinina.

=== 2024: Last match ===
In April 2024, she had her last appearance on the pro circuit in Charleston, South Carolina, where she lost in the first round of qualifying.

== Performance timelines ==
Key
W	F	SF	QF	#R	RR	Q#	P#	DNQ	A	Z#	PO	G	S	B	NMS	NTI	P	NH

(W) winner; (F) finalist; (SF) semifinalist; (QF) quarterfinalist; (#R) rounds 4, 3, 2, 1; (RR) round-robin stage; (Q#) qualification round; (P#) preliminary round; (DNQ) did not qualify; (A) absent; (Z#) Davis/Fed Cup Zonal Group (with number indication) or (PO) play-off; (G) gold, (S) silver or (B) bronze Olympic/Paralympic medal; (NMS) not a Masters tournament; (NTI) not a Tier I tournament; (P) postponed; (NH) not held; (SR) strike rate (events won / competed); (W–L) win–loss record.
To avoid confusion and double counting, these charts are updated at the conclusion of a tournament or when the player's participation has ended.

=== Singles ===
Tournament	2012	2013	2014	2015	2016	2017	2018	2019	2020	2021	2022	2023	SR	W–L
Grand Slam tournaments
Australian Open	A	Q2	Q1	1R	A	A	A	A	A	Q2	Q1	A	0 / 1	0–1
French Open	A	1R	1R	Q2	Q3	Q1	1R	A	A	Q2	Q2	A	0 / 3	0–3
Wimbledon	Q1	Q3	Q2	Q2	Q1	Q1	Q1	A	NH	Q1	Q1	A	0 / 0	0–0
US Open	Q1	1R	1R	Q1	Q2	Q2	Q1	A	A	Q1	A	A	0 / 2	0–2
Win–loss	0–0	0–2	0–2	0–1	0–0	0–0	0–1	0–0	0–0	0–0	0–0	0–0	0 / 6	0–6
Career statistics
Tournaments	3	7	6	5	2	4	1	0	0	4	0	1	Career total: 32	
Hard win–loss	0–2	0–3	1–2	0–2	0–1	1–1	0–0	0–0	0–0	2–1	0–0	0–1	0 / 13	4–13
Clay win–loss	0–0	1–4	5–4	1–3	0–1	0–2	0–1	0–0	0–0	1–3	0–0	0–0	0 / 18	8–18
Grass win–loss	0–1	0–0	0–0	0–0	0–0	0–1	0–0	0–0	0–0	0–0	0–0	0–0	0 / 2	0–2
Overall win–loss	0–3	1–7	6–6	1–5	0–2	1–4	0–1	0–0	0–0	3–4	0–0	0–1	0 / 33	12–33
Year-end ranking	177	151	103	213	135	213	254	273	247	169	368	282	$673,843	

== ITF Circuit finals ==
=== Singles: 23 (12 titles, 11 runner-ups) ===
Legend $50/60,000 tournaments $25,000 tournaments $10,000 tournaments	Finals by surface Hard (4–7) Clay (8–4)

Result	W–L	Date	Tournament	Tier	Surface	Opponent	Score
Loss	0–1	Oct 2011	ITF Rock Hill, United States	25,000	Hard	(Switzerland) Romina Oprandi	7–5, 6–1
Win	1–1	Jan 2012	Innisbrook Open, US	25,000	Hard	(United States) Gail Brodsky	2–6, 6–2, 6–4
Loss	1–2	Mar 2012	ITF Clearwater, US	25,000	Hard	(Spain) Garbiñe Muguruza	0–6, 1–6
Win	2–2	Apr 2012	ITF Indian Harbour Beach, US	50,000	Clay	(United States) Maria Sanchez	6–4, 7–6^{(4)}
Win	3–2	May 2012	ITF Raleigh, US	25,000	Clay	(Belgium) Tamaryn Hendler	3–6, 6–2, 6–3
Win	4–2	Mar 2014	ITF Palm Harbor, US	25,000	Clay	(United States) Nicole Gibbs	7–5, 6–0
Win	5–2	Apr 2014	Dothan Pro Classic, US	50,000	Clay	(United States) Victoria Duval	6–3, 6–1
Loss	5–3	Oct 2014	Tennis Classic of Macon, US	50,000	Hard	(Ukraine) Kateryna Bondarenko	4–6, 5–7
Win	6–3	Oct 2015	ITF Florence, US	25,000	Hard	(Brazil) Paula Cristina Gonçalves	6–2, 4–6, 7–6^{(2)}
Loss	6–4	Mar 2016	ITF Orlando, US	10,000	Clay	(United States) Katerina Stewart	4–6, 3–6
Win	7–4	Apr 2016	ITF Jackson, US	25,000	Clay	(Spain) Paula Badosa	1–6, 6–2, 6–4
Win	8–4	Apr 2016	ITF Pelham, US	25,000	Clay	(United States) Bernarda Pera	6–4, 6–4
Loss	8–5	Apr 2016	Charlottesville Open, US	50,000	Clay	(United States) Taylor Townsend	5–7, 1–6
Loss	8–6	Jul 2016	Sacramento Challenger, US	50,000	Hard	(United States) Sofia Kenin	6–4, 1–6, 4–6
Loss	8–7	Nov 2016	Waco Showdown, US	50,000	Hard	(Brazil) Beatriz Haddad Maia	2–6, 6–3, 1–6
Win	9–7	Aug 2017	Lexington Challenger, US	60,000	Hard	(United States) Sofia Kenin	6–4, 6–1
Loss	9–8	Jan 2018	ITF Daytona Beach, US	25,000	Clay	(Ukraine) Anhelina Kalinina	6–1, 5–7, 0–6
Win	10–8	Jun 2018	ITF Bethany Beach, US	25,000	Clay	(United States) Katerina Stewart	6–2, 6–2
Win	11–8	Jul 2019	ITF Evansville, US	W25	Hard	(Israel) Deniz Khazaniuk	7–6^{(6)}, 4–6, 7–5
Loss	11–9	Oct 2019	ITF Charleston Pro, US	W60	Clay	(United States) Caroline Dolehide	2–6, 7–6^{(5)}, 0–6
Win	12–9	Sep 2020	Přerov Cup, Czech Republic	W25	Clay	(Spain) Georgina García Pérez	6–3, 0–6, 7–5
Loss	12–10	Jan 2021	Georgia's Rome Open, US	W60	Hard (i)	(Spain) Irene Burillo	6–1, 6–7^{(4)}, 1–6
Loss	12–11	Oct 2023	Georgia's Rome Open, US	W60	Hard (i)	(United States) McCartney Kessler	2–6, 1–6

=== Doubles: 2 (1 title, 1 runner-up) ===
Legend
$75,000 tournaments
$10,000 tournaments

Result	W–L	Date	Tournament	Tier	Surface	Partner	Opponents	Score
Win	1–0	Oct 2009	ITF Cleveland, United States	10,000	Clay	(United States) Jamie Hampton	(United States) Taraka Bertrand (United States) Elizabeth Lumpkin	6–1, 6–2
Loss	1–1	Sep 2011	Albuquerque; Championships, US	75,000	Hard	(United States) Melanie Oudin	(United States) Alexa Glatch (United States) Asia Muhammed	6–4, 3–6, [2–10]
