= Jan Abaza =

American tennis player

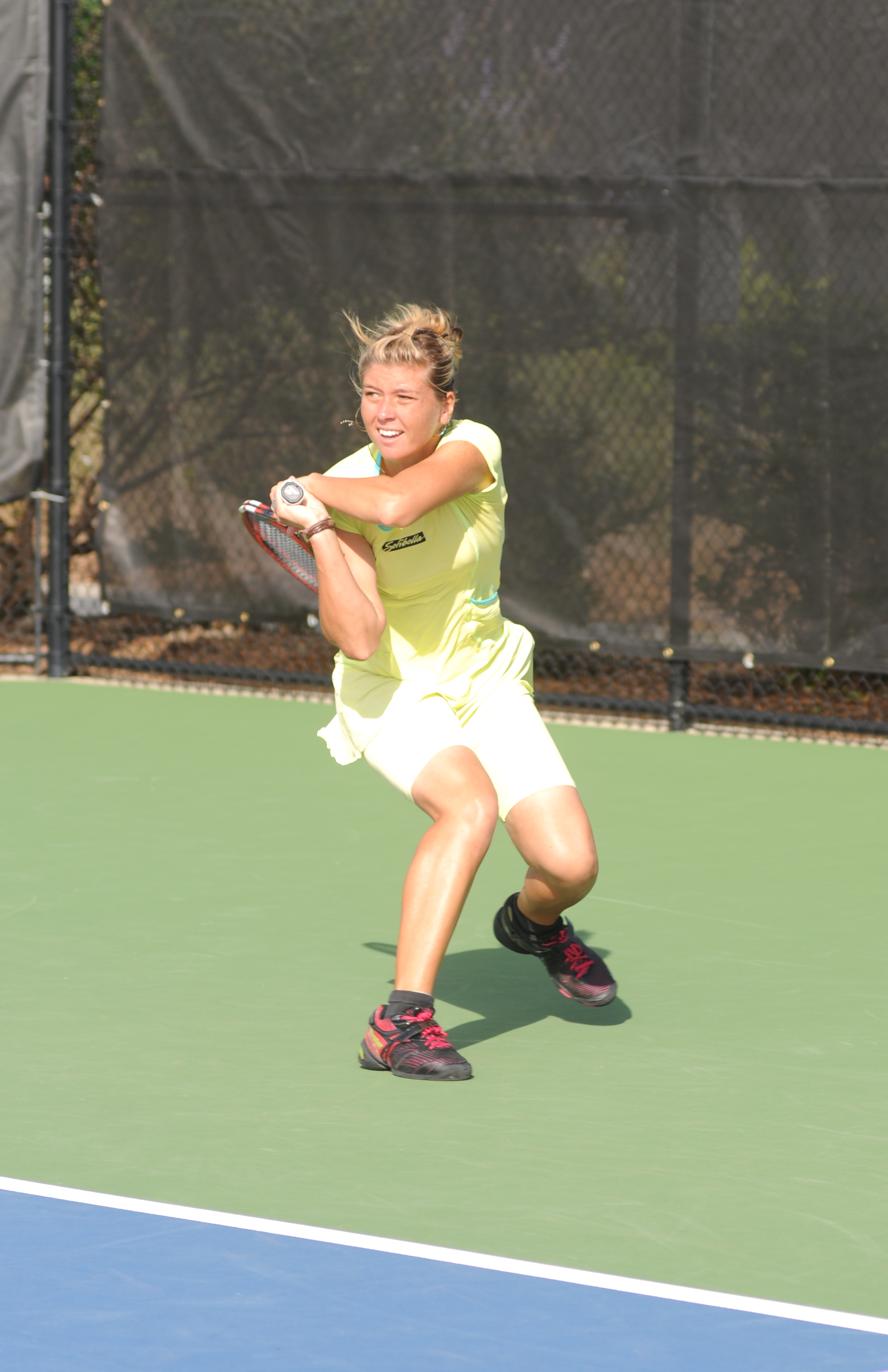
- Abaza at the 2014 Rock Hill Rocks Open
- Country (sports): United States
- Born: March 1, 1995 (age 31) New Jersey, United States
- Prize money: $57,798

Singles
- Career record: 120–97
- Career titles: 2 ITF
- Highest ranking: No. 374 (August 5, 2013)

Grand Slam singles results
- US Open: Q1 (2013)

Doubles
- Career record: 78–48
- Career titles: 9 ITF
- Highest ranking: No. 138 (July 20, 2015)

Jan Abaza (born March 1, 1995) is an American former tennis player of Syrian descent.

She won two singles and nine doubles titles on the ITF Women's Circuit in her career. On August 5, 2013, she reached her best singles ranking of world No. 374. On July 20, 2015, she peaked at No. 138 in the WTA doubles rankings.

Partnering Louisa Chirico, Abaza won her first $50k title at the 2013 Melbourne Pro Classic, defeating Asia Muhammad and Allie Will in the final. However, she couldn't defend her title, losing in the final a year later.

== ITF Circuit finals ==
=== Singles (2–1) ===
| Legend $10,000 tournaments | Finals by surface Hard (2–1) |

| Result | Date | Tournament | Surface | Opponent | Score |
|---|---|---|---|---|---|
| Win | June 23, 2014 | ITF Sharm El Sheikh, Egypt | Hard | (Greece) Despina Papamichail | 6–2, 3–6, 6–4 |
| Loss | June 30, 2014 | ITF Sharm El Sheikh, Egypt | Hard | (Greece) Eleni Kordolaimi | 6–7^{(1)}, 6–3, 5–7 |
| Win | July 7, 2014 | ITF Sharm El Sheikh, Egypt | Hard | (France) Pauline Payet | 6–4, 6–4 |

=== Doubles (9–7) ===
| Legend $75,000 tournaments $50,000 tournaments $25,000 tournaments $10,000 tournaments | Finals by surface Hard (6–3) Clay (3–4) |

| Result | No. | Date | Tier | Tournament | Surface | Partner | Opponents | Score |
|---|---|---|---|---|---|---|---|---|
| Win | 1. | May 2012 | 10,000 | ITF Sumter, US | Hard | (United Kingdom) Nicola Slater | (United States) Elizabeth Ferris (Japan) Mayo Hibi | 7–6^{(1)}, 6–3 |
| Loss | 1. | Feb 2013 | 25,000 | Rancho Mirage Open, United States | Hard | (United States) Louisa Chirico | (United Kingdom) Tara Moore (United Kingdom) Melanie South | 6–4, 2–6, [10–12] |
| Loss | 2. | Mar 2013 | 10,000 | ITF Gainesville, US | Clay | (United States) Nicole Robinson | (United States) Lindsey Hardenbergh (United States) Noelle Hickey | 3–6, 4–6 |
| Win | 2. | Apr 2013 | 50,000 | ITF Indian Harbour Beach, US | Clay | (United States) Louisa Chirico | (United States) Asia Muhammad (United States) Allie Will | 6–4, 6–4 |
| Win | 3. | Jul 2013 | 50,000 | ITF Yakima, US | Hard | (United States) Allie Will | (United Kingdom) Naomi Broady (United States) Irina Falconi | 7–5, 3–6, [10–3] |
| Loss | 3. | Jan 2014 | 25,000 | ITF Port St. Lucie, US | Clay | (United States) Louisa Chirico | (Hungary) Réka Luca Jani (Russia) Irina Khromacheva | 4–6, 4–6 |
| Loss | 4. | Apr 2014 | 50,000 | ITF Indian Harbour Beach, US | Clay | (United States) Sanaz Marand | (United States) Asia Muhammad (United States) Taylor Townsend | 2–6, 1–6 |
| Loss | 5. | Jun 2014 | 10,000 | ITF Sharm El Sheikh, Egypt | Hard | (Egypt) Ola Abou Zekry | (Belgium) Magali Kempen (Russia) Anna Morgina | 4–6, 6–3, [2–10] |
| Win | 4. | Jun 2014 | 10,000 | ITF Sharm El Sheikh | Hard | (Egypt) Ola Abou Zekry | (Greece) Eleni Kordolaimi (Greece) Despoina Vogasari | 6–4, 3–6, [10–7] |
| Win | 5. | Jul 2014 | 10,000 | ITF Sharm El Sheikh | Hard | (Russia) Anastasia Shaulskaya | (Romania) Jaqueline Cristian (Lithuania) Akvilė Paražinskaitė | 6–4, 6–3 |
| Win | 6. | Sep 2014 | 75,000 | Albuquerque Championships, United States | Hard | (United States) Melanie Oudin | (United States) Nicole Melichar (United States) Allie Will | 6–2, 6–3 |
| Loss | 6. | Dec 2014 | 25,000+H | ITF Mérida, Mexico | Hard | (Chinese Taipei) Hsu Chieh-yu | (Germany) Tatjana Maria (Mexico) Renata Zarazúa | 6–7^{(1)}, 1–6 |
| Loss | 7. | Jan 2015 | 25,000 | ITF Plantation, United States | Clay | (United States) Sanaz Marand | (Russia) Irina Khromacheva (United States) Asia Muhammad | 2–6, 2–6 |
| Win | 7. | Jan 2015 | 25,000 | ITF Daytona Beach, US | Clay | (United States) Sanaz Marand | (Belgium) Elise Mertens (Netherlands) Arantxa Rus | 6–4, 3–6, [10–6] |
| Win | 8. | May 2015 | 25,000 | ITF Raleigh, US | Clay | (Poland) Justyna Jegiołka | (United States) Jacqueline Cako (Australia) Sally Peers | 7–6^{(7)}, 4–6, [10–7] |
| Win | 9. | Oct 2015 | 50,000 | Tennis Classic of Macon, US | Hard | (Switzerland) Viktorija Golubic | (Brazil) Paula Cristina Gonçalves (United States) Sanaz Marand | 7–6^{(3)}, 7–5 |
