= Luisa Stefani career statistics =

Career finals
Discipline	Type	Won	Lost	Total
Singles	Grand Slam	–	–	–
Singles	WTA Finals	–	–	–
Singles	WTA 1000	–	–	–
Singles	WTA 500	–	–	–
Singles	WTA 250	–	–	–
Singles	Olympics	–	–	–
Singles	Total	0	0	0
Doubles	Grand Slam	0	1	1
Doubles	WTA Finals	0	1	1
Doubles	WTA 1000	6	2	8
Doubles	WTA 500	7	6	13
Doubles	WTA 250	6	2	8
Doubles	Olympics	–	–	–
Doubles	Total	19	12	31

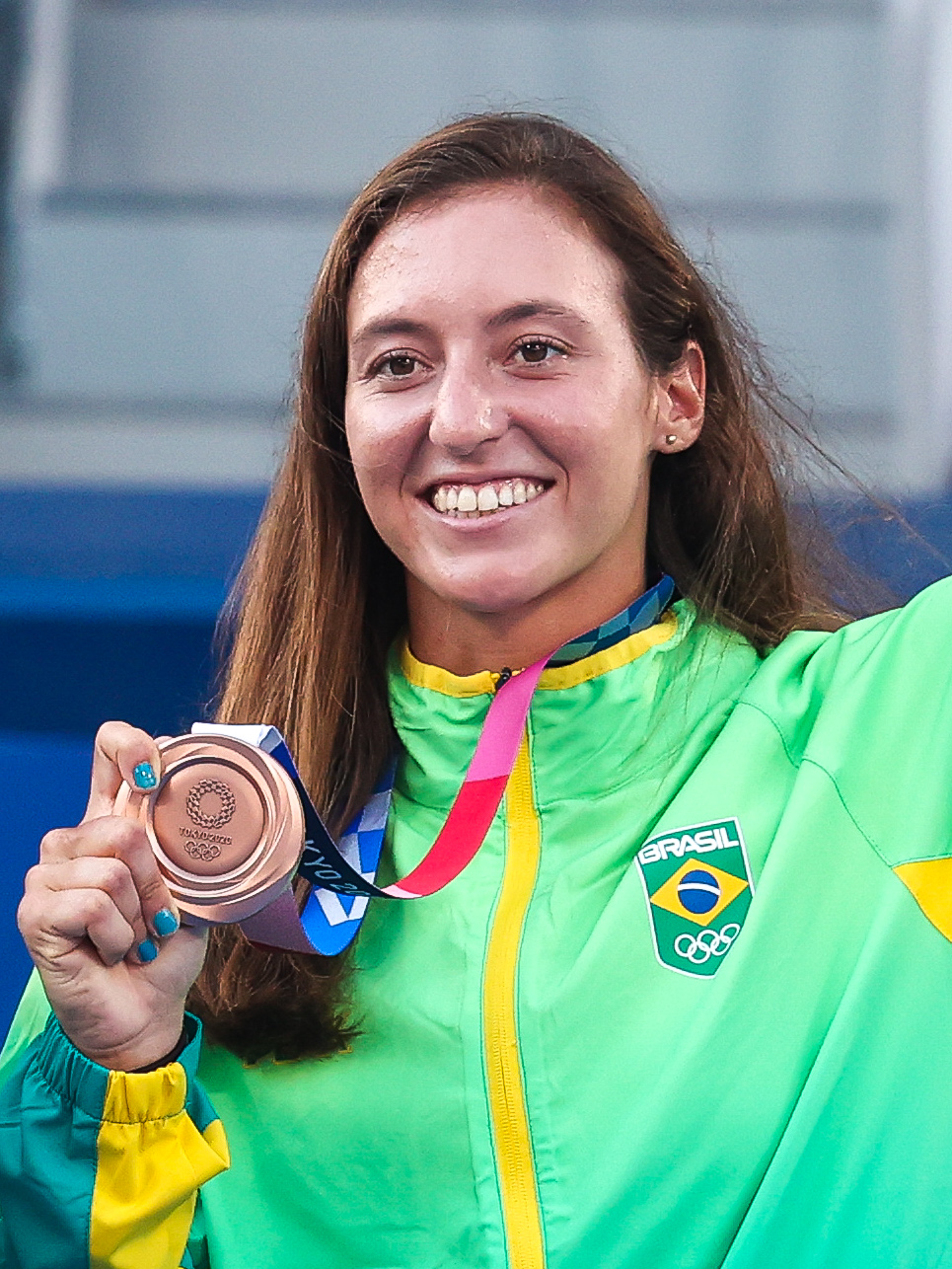
Luisa Stefani at the 2020 Summer Olympics

This is a list of career statistics of Brazilian tennis player Luisa Stefani.

== Performance timelines ==
Key
W	F	SF	QF	#R	RR	Q#	P#	DNQ	A	Z#	PO	G	S	B	NMS	NTI	P	NH

(W) winner; (F) finalist; (SF) semifinalist; (QF) quarterfinalist; (#R) rounds 4, 3, 2, 1; (RR) round-robin stage; (Q#) qualification round; (P#) preliminary round; (DNQ) did not qualify; (A) absent; (Z#) Davis/Fed Cup Zonal Group (with number indication) or (PO) play-off; (G) gold, (S) silver or (B) bronze Olympic/Paralympic medal; (NMS) not a Masters tournament; (NTI) not a Tier I tournament; (P) postponed; (NH) not held; (SR) strike rate (events won / competed); (W–L) win–loss record.
To avoid confusion and double counting, these charts are updated at the conclusion of a tournament or when the player's participation has ended.

Only main-draw results in WTA Tour, Grand Slam tournaments, Fed Cup/Billie Jean King Cup and Olympic Games are included in win–loss records.

=== Doubles ===
Current through the 2026 WTA Finals.

Tournament	2015	2016	...	2019	2020	2021	2022	2023	2024	2025	2026	SR	W–L	Win%
Grand Slam tournaments
Australian Open	A	A		A	3R	3R	A	A	QF	2R	SF	0 / 5	12–5	71%
French Open	A	A		1R	3R	A	A	3R	A	3R	SF	0 / 5	10–5	67%
Wimbledon	A	A		A	NH	1R	A	QF	1R	QF	F	0 / 5	11–5	69%
US Open	A	A		A	QF	SF	A	SF	QF	QF	SF	0 / 6	21–6	77%
Win–Loss	0–0	0–0		0–1	7–3	6–3	0–0	9–3	6–3	9–4	17–4	0 / 20	54–21	72%
Year-end championships
WTA Finals	Did not qualify					A	Did not qualify			F		0 / 1	3–2	60%
National representation
Olympic Games	NH	A		Not held		SF-B	Not held		2R	Not held		0 / 2	5–2	71%
WTA 1000 tournaments
Qatar Open	NTI	A		NTI	1R	NTI	A	1R	W	2R	SF	1 / 5	9–5	64%
Dubai Championships	A	NTI		A	NTI	QF	NTI	1R	1R	QF	W	1 / 5	9–4	69%
Indian Wells Open	A	A		A	NH	A	A	QF	QF	1R	QF	0 / 3	4–3	57%
Miami Open	A	A		A	NH	F	A	1R	1R	2R	SF	0 / 5	8–5	62%
Madrid Open	A	A		A	NH	1R	A	QF	2R	1R	A	0 / 4	3–4	43%
Italian Open	A	A		A	SF	2R	A	1R	1R	1R	1R	0 / 6	4–6	40%
Canadian Open	A	A		A	NH	W	A	2R	1R	2R	A	1 / 4	6–3	67%
Cincinnati Open	A	A		A	2R	F	A	QF	QF	2R	A	0 / 5	10–5	67%
China Open	A	A		A	Not Held			SF	1R	QF	W	1 / 4	10–3	77%
Wuhan Open	A	A		A	Not Held				1R	2R	W	1 / 3	5–2	71%
Guadalajara Open	Not held			Not held			W	2R	Not Tier I			1 / 2	5–1	83%
Career statistics
	2015	2016	...	2019	2020	2021	2022	2023	2024	2025	2026	SR	W–L	Win%
Tournaments	1	1		8	12	17	2	10	18	16	4	Career total: 89		
Titles	0	0		1	1	1	2	2	1	2	1	Career total: 11		
Finals	0	0		2	3	6	2	2	1	2	1	Career total: 19		
Overall win–loss	0–1	1–1		14–7	21–12	37–17	9–1	14–7	23-16	23-14	13-3	8 / 46	109–49	69%
Win %	0%	50%		67%	64%	69%	90%	67%	56%	62%	80%	Career total: 69%		
Year-end ranking	1136	322		75	33	10	55	18	28	14		$2,238,035		

=== Mixed doubles ===
Tournament	2021	2022	2023	2024	2025	SR	W–L	Win%
Grand Slam tournaments
Australian Open	2R	A	W	1R	A	1 / 3	6–2	75%
French Open	A	A	QF	A	R2	0 / 2	3–2	60%
Wimbledon	2R	A	1R	1R	F	0 / 4	5–4	56%
US Open	1R	A	1R	1R	A	0 / 3	0–3	0%
Win–Loss	2–3	0–0	7–3	0–3	5–2	1 / 12	14–11	56%
National representation
Olympic Games	1R	NH		1R	NH	0 / 2	0–2	0%

== Grand Slam tournament finals ==
=== Doubles: 1 (runner-up) ===
Result	Year	Tournament	Surface	Partner	Opponents	Score
Loss	2026	Wimbledon	Grass	(Canada) Gabriela Dabrowski	(France) Kristina Mladenovic (China) Guo Hanyu	3–6, 5–7

=== Mixed doubles: 2 (1 title, 1 runner-up) ===
Result	Year	Tournament	Surface	Partner	Opponents	Score
Win	2023	Australian Open	Hard	(Brazil) Rafael Matos	(India) Sania Mirza (India) Rohan Bopanna	7–6^{(7–2)}, 6–2
Loss	2025	Wimbledon	Grass	(United Kingdom) Joe Salisbury	(Czech Republic) Kateřina Siniaková (Netherlands) Sem Verbeek	6–7^{(3–7)}, 6–7^{(3–7)}

== Other significant finals ==
=== Olympic medal matches ===
==== Doubles: 1 (bronze medal) ====
Result	Year	Tournament	Surface	Partner	Opponents	Score
Bronze	2021	Tokyo Olympics	Hard	(Brazil) Laura Pigossi	(Russia) Veronika Kudermetova (Russia) Elena Vesnina	4–6, 6–4, [11–9]

=== Year-end championships ===
==== Doubles: 1 (runner-up) ====
Result	Year	Location	Surface	Partner	Opponents	Score
Loss	2025	WTA Finals, Saudi Arabia	Hard (i)	(Hungary) Tímea Babos	Veronika Kudermetova (Belgium) Elise Mertens	6–7^{(4–7)}, 1–6

=== WTA 1000 tournaments ===
==== Doubles: 8 (6 titles, 2 runner-ups) ====
Result	Date	Tournament	Surface	Partner	Opponents	Score
Loss	2021	Miami Open	Hard	(United States) Hayley Carter	(Japan) Shuko Aoyama (Japan) Ena Shibahara	2–6, 5–7
Win	2021	Canadian Open	Hard	(Canada) Gabriela Dabrowski	(Croatia) Darija Jurak (Slovenia) Andreja Klepač	6–3, 6–4
Loss	2021	Cincinnati Open	Hard	(Canada) Gabriela Dabrowski	(Australia) Samantha Stosur (China) Zhang Shuai	5–7, 3–6
Win	2022	Guadalajara Open	Hard	(Australia) Storm Sanders	(Kazakhstan) Anna Danilina (Brazil) Beatriz Haddad Maia	7–6^{(7–4)}, 6–7^{(2–7)}, [10–8]
Win	2024	Qatar Ladies Open	Hard	(Netherlands) Demi Schuurs	(United States) Caroline Dolehide (United States) Desirae Krawczyk	6–4, 6–2
Win	2026	Dubai Open	Hard	(Canada) Gabriela Dabrowski	(Germany) Laura Siegemund; Vera Zvonareva	6–1, 6–3
Win	2026	China Open	Hard	(Canada) Gabriela Dabrowski	(Czech Republic) Kateřina Siniaková (China) Zhang Shuai	6–1, 6–2
Win	2026	Wuhan Open	Hard	(Canada) Gabriela Dabrowski	(Czech Republic) Kateřina Siniaková (Australia) Storm Hunter	7–5, 6–4

== WTA Tour finals ==
=== Doubles: 31 (19 titles, 12 runner-ups) ===
Legend Grand Slam (0–1) WTA Finals (0–1) WTA 1000 (6–2) Premier / WTA 500 (7–6) International / WTA 250 (6–2)	Finals by surface Hard (15–10) Clay (2–1) Grass (2–1)	Finals by setting Outdoor (18–10) Indoor (1–2)

Result	W–L	Date	Tournament	Tier	Surface	Partner	Opponents	Score
Loss	0–1	Sep 2019	Korea Open, South Korea	International	Hard	(United States) Hayley Carter	(Spain) Lara Arruabarrena (Germany) Tatjana Maria	6–7^{(7)}, 6–3, [7–10]
Win	1–1	Sep 2019	Tashkent Open, Uzbekistan	International	Hard	(United States) Hayley Carter	(Slovenia) Dalila Jakupović (United States) Sabrina Santamaria	6–3, 7–6^{(4)}
Win	2–1	Aug 2020	Lexington Open, United States	International	Hard	(United States) Hayley Carter	(Czech Republic) Marie Bouzková (Switzerland) Jil Teichmann	6–1, 7–5
Loss	2–2	Sep 2020	Internationaux de Strasbourg, France	International	Clay	(United States) Hayley Carter	(United States) Nicole Melichar-Martinez (Netherlands) Demi Schuurs	4–6, 3–6
Loss	2–3	Oct 2020	Ostrava Open, Czech Republic	Premier	Hard (i)	(Canada) Gabriela Dabrowski	(Belgium) Elise Mertens (Belarus) Aryna Sabalenka	1–6, 3–6
Loss	2–4	Jan 2021	Abu Dhabi Open, UAE	WTA 500	Hard	(United States) Hayley Carter	(Japan) Shuko Aoyama (Japan) Ena Shibahara	6–7^{(5)}, 4–6
Loss	2–5	Feb 2021	Adelaide International, Australia	WTA 500	Hard	(United States) Hayley Carter	(Chile) Alexa Guarachi (United States) Desirae Krawczyk	7–6^{(4)}, 4–6, [3–10]
Loss	2–6	Apr 2021	Miami Open, United States	WTA 1000	Hard	(United States) Hayley Carter	(Japan) Shuko Aoyama (Japan) Ena Shibahara	2–6, 5–7
Loss	2–7	Aug 2021	Silicon Valley Classic, United States	WTA 500	Hard	(Canada) Gabriela Dabrowski	(Croatia) Darija Jurak (Slovenia) Andreja Klepač	1–6, 5–7
Win	3–7	Aug 2021	Canadian Open, Canada	WTA 1000	Hard	(Canada) Gabriela Dabrowski	(Croatia) Darija Jurak (Slovenia) Andreja Klepač	6–3, 6–4
Loss	3–8	Aug 2021	Cincinnati Open, United States	WTA 1000	Hard	(Canada) Gabriela Dabrowski	(Australia) Samantha Stosur (China) Zhang Shuai	5–7, 3–6
Win	4–8	Sep 2022	Chennai Open, India	WTA 250	Hard	(Canada) Gabriela Dabrowski	Anna Blinkova (Georgia (country)) Natela Dzalamidze	6–1, 6–2
Win	5–8	Oct 2022	Guadalajara Open, Mexico	WTA 1000	Hard	(Australia) Storm Sanders	(Kazakhstan) Anna Danilina (Brazil) Beatriz Haddad Maia	7–6^{(7–4)}, 6–7^{(2–7)}, [10–8]
Win	6–8	Jan 2023	Adelaide International, Australia	WTA 500	Hard	(United States) Taylor Townsend	Anastasia Pavlyuchenkova (Kazakhstan) Elena Rybakina	7–5, 7–6^{(7–3)}
Win	7–8	Feb 2023	Abu Dhabi Open, UAE	WTA 500	Hard	(China) Zhang Shuai	(Japan) Shuko Aoyama (Chinese Taipei) Chan Hao-ching	3–6, 6–2, [10–8]
Win	8–8	Jun 2023	Berlin Tennis Open, Germany	WTA 500	Grass	(France) Caroline Garcia	(Czech Republic) Kateřina Siniaková (Czech Republic) Markéta Vondroušová	4–6, 7–6^{(10–8)}, [10–4]
Win	9–8	Feb 2024	Qatar Ladies Open, Qatar	WTA 1000	Hard	(Netherlands) Demi Schuurs	(United States) Caroline Dolehide (United States) Desirae Krawczyk	6–4, 6–2
Win	10–8	Jan 2025	Linz Open, Austria	WTA 500	Hard (i)	(Hungary) Tímea Babos	(Ukraine) Lyudmyla Kichenok (Ukraine) Nadiia Kichenok	3–6, 7–5, [10–4]
Win	11–8	May 2025	Internationaux de Strasbourg, France	WTA 500	Clay	(Hungary) Tímea Babos	(United States) Nicole Melichar-Martinez (China) Guo Hanyu	6–3, 6–7^{(4–7)}, [10–7]
Win	12–8	Sep 2025	SP Open, Brazil	WTA 250	Hard	(Hungary) Tímea Babos	(Brazil) Laura Pigossi (Brazil) Ingrid Martins	4–6, 6–3, [10–4]
Loss	12–9	Oct 2025	Ningbo Open, China	WTA 500	Hard	(Hungary) Tímea Babos	(United States) Nicole Melichar-Martinez; Liudmila Samsonova	7–5, 4–6, [8–10]
Win	13–9	Oct 2025	Pan Pacific Open, Japan	WTA 500	Hard	(Hungary) Tímea Babos	(Kazakhstan) Anna Danilina (Serbia) Aleksandra Krunić	6–1, 6–4
Loss	13–10	Nov 2025	WTA Finals Riyadh, Saudi Arabia	Finals	Hard (i)	(Hungary) Tímea Babos	Veronika Kudermetova (Belgium) Elise Mertens	6–7^{(4–7)}, 1–6
Win	14–10	Feb 2026	Dubai Open, UAE	WTA 1000	Hard	(Canada) Gabriela Dabrowski	(Germany) Laura Siegemund; Vera Zvonareva	6–1, 6–3
Win	15–10	May 2026	Internationaux de Strasbourg, France (2)	WTA 500	Clay	(Canada) Gabriela Dabrowski	(United States) Quinn Gleason (Norway) Ulrikke Eikeri	7–5, 6–4
Win	16–10	Jun 2026	Eastbourne Open, UK	WTA 250	Grass	(Canada) Gabriela Dabrowski	(Czech Republic) Jesika Malečková (Czech Republic) Miriam Škoch	6–1, 6–4
Loss	16–11	Jul 2026	Wimbledon, UK	Grand Slam	Grass	(Canada) Gabriela Dabrowski	(France) Kristina Mladenovic (China) Guo Hanyu	3–6, 5–7
Win	17–11	Sep 2026	SP Open, Brazil (2)	WTA 250	Hard	(Canada) Gabriela Dabrowski	(United States) Anna Rogers (United States) Allura Zamarripa	6–3, 3–6, [10–7]
Win	18–11	Oct 2026	China Open, China	WTA 1000	Hard	(Canada) Gabriela Dabrowski	(Czech Republic) Kateřina Siniaková (China) Zhang Shuai	6–1, 6–2
Win	19–11	Oct 2026	Wuhan Open, China	WTA 1000	Hard	(Canada) Gabriela Dabrowski	(Australia) Storm Hunter (Czech Republic) Kateřina Siniaková	7–5, 6–4
Loss	19–12	Oct 2026	Pan Pacific Open, Japan	WTA 500	Hard	(Canada) Gabriela Dabrowski	(Italy) Sara Errani (Italy) Jasmine Paolini	2–6, 2–6

== WTA 125 finals ==
=== Doubles: 4 (3 titles, 1 runner-up) ===
Result	W–L	Date	Tournament	Surface	Partner	Opponents	Score
Win	1–0	Nov 2019	Houston Challenger, US	Hard	(Australia) Ellen Perez	(Canada) Sharon Fichman (Japan) Ena Shibahara	1–6, 6–4, [10–5]
Win	2–0	Feb 2020	Newport Beach Challenger, US	Hard	(United States) Hayley Carter	(Belgium) Marie Benoît (France) Jessika Ponchet	6–1, 6–3
Loss	2–1	May 2021	Open de Saint-Malo, France	Clay	(United States) Hayley Carter	(United States) Kaitlyn Christian (United States) Sabrina Santamaria	6–7^{(4–7)}, 6–4, [5–10]
Win	3–1	Nov 2022	Montevideo Open, Uruguay	Clay	(Brazil) Ingrid Martins	(United States) Quinn Gleason (France) Elixane Lechemia	7–5, 6–7^{(6–8)}, [10–6]

== ITF Circuit finals ==
=== Doubles: 22 (15 titles, 7 runner-ups) ===
Legend
$100,000 tournaments (1–0)
$80,000 tournaments (0–1)
$50/60,000 tournaments (3–2)
$25,000 tournaments (8–3)
$10/15,000 tournaments (3–1)

Result	W–L	Date	Tournament	Tier	Surface	Partner	Opponents	Score
Loss	0–1	Aug 2013	ITF São Paulo, Brazil	10,000	Clay	(Brazil) Nathália Rossi	(Brazil) Laura Pigossi (Argentina) Carolina Zeballos	3–6, 4–6
Loss	0–2	Jul 2016	ITF Campos do Jordão, Brazil	25,000	Hard	(Brazil) Maria Fernanda Alves	(Brazil) Ingrid Martins (Brazil) Laura Pigossi	3–6, 6–3, [8–10]
Win	1–2	Sep 2016	Atlanta Open, US	50,000	Hard	(United States) Ingrid Neel	(United States) Alexandra Stevenson (United States) Taylor Townsend	4–6, 6–4, [10–5]
Loss	1–3	Jun 2017	ITF Sumter, US	25,000	Hard	(Australia) Ellen Perez	(United States) Kaitlyn Christian (Mexico) Giuliana Olmos	2–6, 6–3, [7–10]
Win	2–3	Jun 2017	ITF Baton Rouge, US	25,000	Hard	(Australia) Ellen Perez	(United States) Francesca Di Lorenzo (United States) Julia Elbaba	6–3, 6–4
Loss	2–4	Jul 2017	ITF Auburn, US	25,000	Hard	(Australia) Ellen Perez	(United States) Emina Bektas (Chile) Alexa Guarachi	6–4, 4–6, [5–10]
Win	3–4	Jul 2017	ITF Knokke, Belgium	15,000	Clay	(United States) Quinn Gleason	(Switzerland) Leonie Küng (Belgium) Axana Mareen	6–4, 7–5
Win	4–4	Jul 2017	ITF Brussels, Belgium	15,000	Clay	(United States) Quinn Gleason	(Belgium) Deborah Kerfs (France) Priscilla Heise	6–3, 6–2
Win	5–4	Aug 2017	ITF El Espinar, Spain	25,000	Hard	(United States) Quinn Gleason	(Turkey) Ayla Aksu (Netherlands) Bibiane Schoofs	6–3, 6–2
Win	6–4	Oct 2017	ITF Seville, Spain	25,000	Clay	(Mexico) Renata Zarazúa	(Spain) Estrella Cabeza Candela (Venezuela) Andrea Gámiz	7–6^{(2)}, 7–6^{(3)}
Win	7–4	Nov 2017	ITF Sant Cugat, Spain	25,000	Clay	(Mexico) Renata Zarazúa	(Serbia) Olga Danilović (Spain) Guiomar Maristany	6–1, 6–4
Win	8–4	Dec 2017	ITF Castellón, Spain	15,000	Clay	(Spain) Yvonne Cavallé Reimers	(China) Ren Jiaqi (China) Wang Xiyu	6–3, 6–1
Win	9–4	Jun 2018	ITF Sumter, US	25,000	Hard	(Australia) Astra Sharma	(United States) Julia Elbaba (China) Xu Shilin	2–6, 6–3, [10–5]
Loss	9–5	Sep 2018	Templeton Pro Open, US	60,000	Hard	(United States) Quinn Gleason	(United States) Asia Muhammad (United States) Maria Sanchez	7–6^{(4)}, 2–6, [8–10]
Loss	9–6	Oct 2018	Stockton Challenger, US	60,000	Hard	(United States) Quinn Gleason	(United States) Hayley Carter (United States) Ena Shibahara	5–7, 7–5, [7–10]
Win	10–6	Nov 2018	Copa Colina, Chile	60,000	Clay	(United States) Quinn Gleason	(Chile) Bárbara Gatica (Brazil) Rebeca Pereira	6–0, 4–6, [10–7]
Win	11–6	Jan 2019	ITF Petit-Bourg, Guadeloupe	W25	Hard	(United States) Quinn Gleason	(Montenegro) Vladica Babić (Netherlands) Rosalie van der Hoek	7–5, 6–4
Win	12–6	Mar 2019	ITF São Paulo, Brazil	W25	Clay	(Brazil) Paula Cristina Gonçalves	(Italy) Martina di Giuseppe (Brazil) Thaisa Grana Pedretti	6–7^{(4)}, 6–0, [10–8]
Win	13–6	Mar 2019	ITF Curitiba, Brazil	W25	Clay	(Brazil) Paula Cristina Gonçalves	(Georgia (country)) Ekaterine Gorgodze (Chile) Daniela Seguel	6–7^{(3)}, 7–6^{(0)}, [10–2]
Loss	13–7	May 2019	Open de Cagnes-sur-Mer, France	W80	Clay	(Brazil) Beatriz Haddad Maia	(Russia) Anna Blinkova (Switzerland) Xenia Knoll	6–4, 2–6, [12–14]
Win	14–7	Jun 2019	Ilkley Trophy, UK	W100	Grass	(Brazil) Beatriz Haddad Maia	(Australia) Ellen Perez (Australia) Arina Rodionova	6–4, 6–7^{(5)}, [10–4]
Win	15–7	Nov 2019	Copa Colina, Chile (2)	W60	Clay	(United States) Hayley Carter	(Kazakhstan) Anna Danilina (Switzerland) Conny Perrin	5–7, 6–3, [10–6]

== Awards ==
2016

- WCC Women's Tennis Player of the Year
- WCC Women's Tennis Freshman of the Year
- ITA National Rookie of the Year (Division I)

2017

- WCC Women's Tennis Player of the Year

2021

- Prêmio Brasil Olímpico - Best Brazilian tennis player of the year (tied with Laura Pigossi)
- WTA Doubles March Shot of the Month (playing alongside Hayley Carter)
- WTA Doubles August Shot of the Month (playing alongside Gabriela Dabrowski)
- WTA Doubles Shot of the Year (playing alongside Gabriela Dabrowski)

2022

- WTA Doubles October Shot of the Month (playing alongside Storm Sanders)

2024

- WTA Doubles March Shot of the Month (playing alongside Demi Schuurs)

2025

- WTA Doubles October Shot of the Month (playing alongside Tímea Babos)

2026

- Prêmio Brasil Olímpico - Best Brazilian tennis player of the year.
