= Jennifer Brady career statistics =

Career finals
Discipline	Type	Won	Lost	Total	WR
Singles	Grand Slam	0	1	1	0.00
Singles	Summer Olympics	–	–	–	–
Singles	WTA Finals	–	–	–	–
Singles	WTA 1000	–	–	–	–
Singles	WTA Tour	1	0	1	1.00
Singles	Total	1	1	2	0.50
Doubles	Grand Slam	–	–	–	–
Doubles	Summer Olympics	–	–	–	–
Doubles	WTA Finals	–	–	–	–
Doubles	WTA 1000	–	–	–	–
Doubles	WTA Tour	1	0	1	1.00
Doubles	Total	1	0	1	1.00
Total		2	1	3	0.67

This is a list of the main career statistics of professional American tennis player Jennifer Brady.

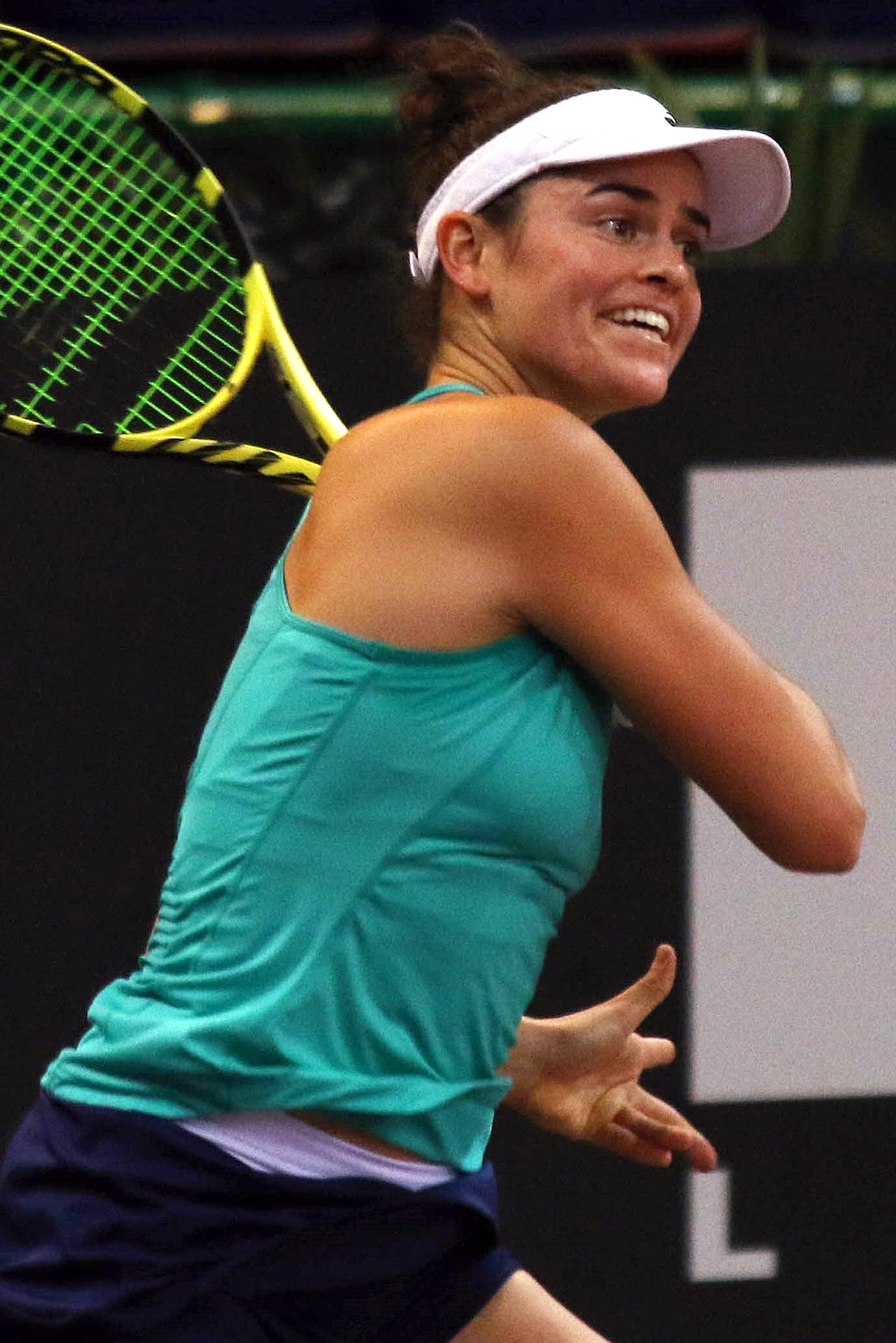
Brady at the 2019 Open de Limoges

== Performance timelines ==
Key
W	F	SF	QF	#R	RR	Q#	P#	DNQ	A	Z#	PO	G	S	B	NMS	NTI	P	NH

(W) winner; (F) finalist; (SF) semifinalist; (QF) quarterfinalist; (#R) rounds 4, 3, 2, 1; (RR) round-robin stage; (Q#) qualification round; (P#) preliminary round; (DNQ) did not qualify; (A) absent; (Z#) Davis/Fed Cup Zonal Group (with number indication) or (PO) play-off; (G) gold, (S) silver or (B) bronze Olympic/Paralympic medal; (NMS) not a Masters tournament; (NTI) not a Tier I tournament; (P) postponed; (NH) not held; (SR) strike rate (events won / competed); (W–L) win–loss record.
To avoid confusion and double counting, these charts are updated at the conclusion of a tournament or when the player's participation has ended.

Only main-draw results in WTA Tour, Grand Slam tournaments, Billie Jean King Cup, United Cup, Hopman Cup and Olympic Games are included in win–loss records.

=== Singles ===
Current through the 2026 Miami Open.

Tournament	2014	2015	2016	2017	2018	2019	2020	2021	2022	2023	...	2026	SR	W–L	Win %
Grand Slam tournaments
Australian Open	A	A	A	4R	1R	Q3	1R	F	A	A		A	0 / 4	9–4	69%
French Open	A	A	Q3	1R	2R	2R	1R	3R	A	A			0 / 5	4–5	44%
Wimbledon	A	A	Q1	2R	2R	1R	NH	A	A	A			0 / 3	2–3	40%
US Open	Q1	Q1	Q3	4R	1R	1R	SF	A	A	3R			0 / 5	10–5	67%
Win–loss	0–0	0–0	0–0	7–4	2–4	1–3	5–3	8–2	0–0	2–1		0–0	0 / 17	25–17	60%
National representation
Summer Olympics	NH		A	NH				1R	NH			NH	0 / 1	0–1	0%
WTA 1000
Qatar Open (Note: The first Premier 5 event of the year has switched back and forth between the Dubai Tennis Championships and the Qatar Open since 2009. Dubai was classified as a Premier 5 event from 2009 to 2011 before being succeeded by Doha for the 2012–2014 period. In 2015, Dubai regained its Premier 5 status while Doha was demoted to Premier status. The Premier 5 tournaments were reclassified as WTA 1000 tournaments in 2021.)	A	NTI	A	NTI	A	NTI	2R	NTI	A	NTI		A	0 / 1	1–1	50%
Dubai Championships	NTI	A	NTI	A	NTI	3R	NTI	A	NTI	A		A	0 / 1	2–1	67%
Indian Wells Open	A	A	A	1R	2R	3R	NH	A	A	A		1R	0 / 4	3–4	43%
Miami Open	A	A	A	1R	1R	Q1	NH	2R	A	A		1R	0 / 4	0–4	0%
Madrid Open	A	A	A	Q2	Q1	Q2	NH	3R	A	A			0 / 1	2–1	67%
Italian Open	A	A	A	Q1	Q1	A	A	2R (Note: Withdrew during the tournament. Not counted as a loss.)	A	A			0 / 1	1–0	100%
Canadian Open	A	A	1R	Q1	Q2	2R	NH	A	A	2R			0 / 3	2–3	40%
Cincinnati Open	A	Q1	Q2	Q2	Q2	2R	1R	2R	A	1R			0 / 4	2–4	33%
Guadalajara Open	NH								A	A	NTI		0 / 0	0–0	–
China Open	A	A	A	1R	Q1	3R	NH			2R			0 / 3	3–3	50%
Wuhan Open	A	A	Q1	A	A	1R	NH						0 / 1	0–1	0%
Win–loss	0–0	0–0	0–1	0–3	1–2	8–6	1–2	4–3	0–0	2–3		0–1	0 / 22	16–21	43%
Career statistics
	2014	2015	2016	2017	2018	2019	2020	2021	2022	2023	...	2026	SR	W–L	Win %
Tournaments	0	0	4	14	13	16	10	11	0	5		2	Career total: 75		
Titles	0	0	0	0	0	0	1	0	0	0		0	Career total: 1		
Finals	0	0	0	0	0	0	1	1	0	0		0	Career total: 2		
Hard win–loss	0–0	0–0	2–3	9–9	3–7	9–10	19–8	10–7	0–0	5–5		0–2	1 / 53	57–51	53%
Clay win–loss	0–0	0–0	0–1	0–4	1–3	2–3	0–1	5–3	0–0	0–0		0–0	0 / 16	8–15	35%
Grass win–loss	0–0	0–0	0–0	1–1	1–2	4–3	0–0	0–0	0–0	0–0		0–0	0 / 6	6–6	50%
Overall win–loss	0–0	0–0	2–4	10–14	5–12	15–16	19–9	15–10	0–0	5–5		0–2	1 / 75	71–72	50%
Year-end ranking (Note: 2013: WTA ranking–600.)	267	229	111	64	116	56	24	25	227	n/a			$5,037,050		

=== Doubles ===
Tournament	2014	2015	2016	2017	2018	2019	2020	2021	2022	2023	SR	W–L
Australian Open	A	A	A	A	QF	SF	QF	2R (Note: Brady alongside Ashleigh Barty withdrew before second-round against Elise Mertens-Aryna Sabalenka.)	A	A	0 / 4	11–3
French Open	A	A	A	2R	3R	1R	2R	A	A	A	0 / 4	4–4
Wimbledon	A	A	A	1R	2R	2R	NH	A	A	A	0 / 3	2–3
US Open	1R	A	A	1R	2R	1R	1R	A	A	SF	0 / 6	5–6
Win–loss	0–1	0–0	0–0	1–3	7–4	5–4	4–3	1–0	0–0	4–1	0 / 17	22–16
Career statistics
Year-end ranking	487	307	380	209	75	50	72	83	–			

== Significant finals ==
=== Grand Slam tournaments ===
==== Singles: 1 (runner-up) ====
Result	Year	Tournament	Surface	Opponent	Score
Loss	2021	Australian Open	Hard	(Japan) Naomi Osaka	4–6, 3–6

== WTA career finals ==
=== Singles: 2 (1 title, 1 runner-up) ===
Legend Grand Slam (0–1) WTA 1000 WTA 500 International / WTA 250 (1–0)	Finals by surface Hard (1–1) Grass (0–0) Clay (0–0) Carpet (0–0)

Result	W–L	Date	Tournament	Tier	Surface	Opponent	Score
Win	1–0	Aug 2020	Lexington Open, United States	International	Hard	(Switzerland) Jil Teichmann	6–3, 6–4
Loss	1–1	Feb 2021	Australian Open, Australia	Grand Slam	Hard	(Japan) Naomi Osaka	4–6, 3–6

=== Doubles: 1 (1 title) ===
Legend Grand Slam WTA 1000 WTA 500 (1–0) WTA 250	Finals by surface Hard (0–0) Grass (0–0) Clay (1–0) Carpet (0–0)

Result	W–L	Date	Tournament	Surface	Partner	Opponents	Score
Win	1–0	Apr 2021	Stuttgart Open, Germany	Clay (i)	(Australia) Ashleigh Barty	(United States) Desirae Krawczyk (United States) Bethanie Mattek-Sands	6–4, 5–7, [10–5]

== WTA 125 tournament finals ==
=== Singles: 1 (runner-up) ===
Result	Date	Tournament	Surface	Opponent	Score
Loss	Mar 2019	Indian Wells Challenger, United States	Hard	(Switzerland) Viktorija Golubic	6–3, 5–7, 3–6

=== Doubles: 1 (runner-up) ===
Result	Date	Tournament	Surface	Partner	Opponents	Score
Loss	Mar 2018	Indian Wells Challenger, United States	Hard	(United States) Vania King	(United States) Taylor Townsend (Belgium) Yanina Wickmayer	4–6, 4–6

== ITF Circuit finals ==
Legend
$75,000 tournaments (1–0)
$50,000 tournaments (1–1)
$25,000 tournaments (2–1)

=== Singles: 6 (4 titles, 2 runner–ups) ===
Result	W–L	Date	Tournament	Tier	Surface	Opponent	Score
Win	1–0	Sep 2014	ITF Redding, United States	25,000	Hard	(United States) Lauren Embree	6–2, 6–1
Loss	1–1	Nov 2014	ITF New Braunfels, United States	50,000	Hard	(United States) Irina Falconi	6–7^{(3–7)}, 2–6
Loss	1–2	Jul 2015	ITF El Paso, United States	25,000	Hard	(United States) Jamie Loeb	7–6^{(7–9)}, 4–6, 2–6
Win	2–2	Oct 2015	ITF Rock Hill, United States	25,000	Hard	(Venezuela) Andrea Gámiz	7–5, 6–4
Win	3–2	May 2016	ITF Indian Harbour Beach, United States	75,000	Clay	(United States) Taylor Townsend	6–3, 7–5
Win	4–2	Aug 2016	Granby Challenger, Canada	50,000	Hard	(Belarus) Olga Govortsova	7–5, 6–2

=== Doubles: 5 (5 titles) ===
Legend
$100,000 tournaments (1–0)
$25,000 tournaments (2–0)
$10,000 tournaments (2–0)

Result	W–L	Date	Tournament	Tier	Surface	Partner	Opponents	Score
Win	1–0	Oct 2011	ITF Amelia Island, United States	10,000	Clay	(United States) Kendal Woodward	(United States) Erin Clark (China) Wen Xin	5–7, 6–1, [10–7]
Win	2–0	Oct 2011	ITF Montego Bay, Jamaica	10,000	Hard	(Czech Republic) Nikola Hübnerová	(Mexico) Ximena Hermoso (Mexico) Ivette López	6–3, 6–1
Win	3–0	Sep 2014	ITF Redding, United States	25,000	Hard	(United States) Lauren Embree	(United States) Alexandra Facey (United States) Kat Facey	6–3, 6–2
Win	4–0	Jul 2015	ITF El Paso, United States	25,000	Hard	(Chile) Alexa Guarachi	(United States) Robin Anderson (United States) Maegan Manasse	3–6, 6–3, [10–7]
Win	5–0	Jun 2019	Surbiton Trophy, United Kingdom	100,000	Grass	(United States) Caroline Dolehide	(United Kingdom) Heather Watson (Belgium) Yanina Wickmayer	6–3, 6–4

== WTA Tour career earnings ==
As of 1 November 2021

Year	Grand Slam singles titles	WTA singles titles	Total singles titles	Earnings ($)	Money list rank
2016	0	0	0	103,245	186
2017	0	0	0	682,346	46
2018	0	0	0	473,208	80
2019	0	0	0	679,370	59
2020	0	1	1	1,319,956	8
2021	0	0	0	1,315,239	20
Career	0	1	1	4,644,655	129

== Career Grand Slam statistics ==
=== Grand Slam seedings ===
The tournaments won by Brady are in boldface, and advanced into finals by Brady are in italics.

Season	Australian Open	French Open	Wimbledon	US Open
2014	did not play	did not play	did not play	did not qualify
2015	did not play	did not play	did not play	did not qualify
2016	did not play	did not qualify	did not qualify	did not qualify
2017	qualifier	not seeded	not seeded	not seeded
2018	not seeded	not seeded	not seeded	not seeded
2019	did not qualify	not seeded	not seeded	not seeded
2020	not seeded	21st	cancelled	28th
2021	22nd (1)	13th	did not play	did not play
2022	did not play	did not play	did not play	did not play
2023	did not play	did not play	did not play	protected ranking
2024	did not play	did not play	did not play	did not play
2025	did not play	did not play	did not play	did not play
2026	did not play			

== Top 10 wins ==
Season	2020	Total
Wins	2	2

#	Opponent	Rank	Event	Surface	Rd	Score	JBR
2020
1.	(Australia) Ashleigh Barty	No. 1	Brisbane International, Australia	Hard	2R	6–4, 7–6^{(7–4)}	No. 53
2.	(Ukraine) Elina Svitolina	No. 6	Dubai Championships, UAE	Hard	1R	6–2, 6–1	No. 52
