= 2013 John Newcombe Women's Pro Challenge =

- Date: October 28–November 3
- Edition: 2nd
- Category: ITF Women's Circuit
- Prize money: $50,000
- Surface: Hard
- Location: New Braunfels, Texas, United States

Champions

Singles
- (Georgia (country)) Anna Tatishvili

Doubles
- (Georgia (country)) Anna Tatishvili / (United States) CoCo Vandeweghe
← 2012 ·	John Newcombe Women's Pro Challenge	· 2014 →

The 2013 John Newcombe Women's Pro Challenge was a professional tennis tournament played on outdoor hard courts. It was the second edition of the John Newcombe Women's Pro Challenge, which was part of the 2013 ITF Women's Circuit, offering a total of $50,000 in prize money. It took place in New Braunfels, Texas, United States, on October 28 – November 3, 2013.

== WTA entrants ==
=== Seeds ===
Country	Player	Rank^{1}	Seed
COL	Mariana Duque	97	1
POR	Michelle Larcher de Brito	106	2
USA	CoCo Vandeweghe	113	3
USA	Maria Sanchez	140	4
USA	Madison Brengle	155	5
GEO	Anna Tatishvili	158	6
USA	Julia Cohen	185	7
COL	Catalina Castaño	198	8

- ^{1} Rankings as of October 21, 2013

=== Other entrants ===
The following players received wildcards into the singles main draw:

- (United States) Rosalia Alda
- (United States) Jacqueline Cako
- (United States) Julia Elbaba
- (United States) Ashley Weinhold

The following players received entry from the qualifying draw:

- (United States) Danielle Lao
- (United States) Jessica Lawrence
- (Japan) Mari Osaka
- (United States) Blair Shankle

The following players received entry by a junior exempt:

- (United States) Taylor Townsend

The following players received entry by a protected ranking:

- (Norway) Ulrikke Eikeri

== Champions ==
=== Singles ===
- (Georgia (country)) Anna Tatishvili def. (Bulgaria) Elitsa Kostova 6–4, 6–4

=== Doubles ===
- (Georgia (country)) Anna Tatishvili / (United States) CoCo Vandeweghe def. (United States) Asia Muhammad / (United States) Taylor Townsend, 3–6, 6–3, [13–11]
