= 2016 One Love Tennis Open =

- Date: 12–18 September
- Edition: 1st
- Category: ITF Women's Circuit
- Prize money: $50,000
- Surface: Hard
- Location: Atlanta, United States

Champions

Singles
- (Belgium) Elise Mertens

Doubles
- (United States) Ingrid Neel / (Brazil) Luisa Stefani
One Love Tennis Open	· 2017 →

The 2016 One Love Tennis Open was a professional tennis tournament played on outdoor hard courts. It was the 1st edition of the tournament and part of the 2016 ITF Women's Circuit, offering a total of $50,000 in prize money. It took place in Atlanta, United States, on 12–18 September 2016.

== Singles main draw entrants ==
=== Seeds ===
Country	Player	Rank^{1}	Seed
BEL	Elise Mertens	137	1
USA	Taylor Townsend	146	2
NED	Michaëlla Krajicek	156	3
BRA	Paula Cristina Gonçalves	160	4
FRA	Alizé Lim	180	5
PAR	Montserrat González	192	6
CHN	Xu Shilin	213	7
FRA	Shérazad Reix	221	8

- ^{1} Rankings as of 29 August 2016.

=== Other entrants ===
The following player received a wildcard into the singles main draw:

- (United States) Anna Bright
- (United States) Sophie Chang
- (United States) Julia Elbaba
- (United States) Alexandra Sanford

The following players received entry from the qualifying draw:

- (Spain) Marta González Encinas
- (United States) Brianna Morgan
- (United States) Ingrid Neel
- (Brazil) Luisa Stefani

== Champions ==
=== Singles ===
- (Belgium) Elise Mertens def. (United States) Melanie Oudin, 6–4, 6–2

=== Doubles ===
- (United States) Ingrid Neel / (Brazil) Luisa Stefani def. (United States) Alexandra Stevenson / (United States) Taylor Townsend, 4–6, 6–4, [10–5]
