= 2014 John Newcombe Women's Pro Challenge =

- Date: 27 October–2 November
- Edition: 3rd
- Category: ITF Women's Circuit
- Prize money: $50,000
- Surface: Hard / Outdoor
- Location: New Braunfels, Texas, United States

Champions

Singles
- (United States) Irina Falconi

Doubles
- (Paraguay) Verónica Cepede Royg / (Colombia) Mariana Duque
← 2013 ·	John Newcombe Women's Pro Challenge	· 2015 →

The 2014 John Newcombe Women's Pro Challenge is a professional tennis tournament played on outdoor hard courts. It is the 3rd edition of the tournament which is part of the 2014 ITF Women's Circuit, offering a total of $50,000 in prize money. It takes place in New Braunfels, Texas, United States between 27 October to 2 November 2014.

== Singles main-draw entrants ==
=== Seeds ===
Country	Player	Rank^{1}	Seed
USA	Anna Tatishvili	113	1
USA	Grace Min	117	2
AUS	Olivia Rogowska	124	3
POR	Michelle Larcher de Brito	125	4
COL	Mariana Duque	126	5
USA	Irina Falconi	132	6
PAR	Verónica Cepede Royg	140	7
~~USA~~	~~Melanie Oudin~~	~~143~~	~~8~~
USA	Louisa Chirico	190	9

- ^{1} Rankings are as of October 20, 2014

=== Other entrants ===
The following players received wildcards into the singles main draw:

- (United States) Robin Anderson
- (United States) Alexa Glatch
- (United States) Bernarda Pera

The following players received entry from the qualifying draw:

- (United States) Kristie Ahn
- (United States) Julia Elbaba
- (Romania) Edina Gallovits-Hall
- (Italy) Gaia Sanesi

The following player received entry by a lucky loser spot:

- (Czech Republic) Nicole Vaidišová

== Champions ==
=== Singles ===
- (United States) Irina Falconi def. (United States) Jennifer Brady, 7–6^{(7–3)}, 6–2

=== Doubles ===
- (Paraguay) Verónica Cepede Royg / (Colombia) Mariana Duque def. (United States) Alexa Glatch / (United States) Bernarda Pera, 6–0, 6–3
