= 2013 John Newcombe Women's Pro Challenge – Singles =

Singles
- 2013 John Newcombe Women's Pro Challenge

Final
- Champion: (Georgia (country)) Anna Tatishvili
- Runner-up: (Bulgaria) Elitsa Kostova
- Score: 6–4, 6–4

Events
Singles	Doubles
← 2012 ·	John Newcombe Women's Pro Challenge	· 2014 →

Melanie Oudin was the defending champion, but chose to compete at the 2013 Tevlin Women's Challenger instead.

Anna Tatishvili won the title, defeating Elitsa Kostova in the final, 6–4, 6–4.

== Seeds ==
1. (Colombia) Mariana Duque (first round)
2. (Portugal) Michelle Larcher de Brito (first round)
3. (United States) Coco Vandeweghe (first round)
4. (United States) Maria Sanchez (quarterfinals)
5. (United States) Madison Brengle (quarterfinals)
6. (Georgia (country)) Anna Tatishvili (champion)
7. (United States) Julia Cohen (second round)
8. (Colombia) Catalina Castaño (second round)

== Main draw ==
=== Key ===
- Q = Qualifier
- WC = Wild card
- LL = Lucky loser
- Alt = Alternate
- SE = Special exempt
- PR = Protected ranking
- ITF = ITF entry
- JE = Junior exempt
- w/o = Walkover
- r = Retired
- d = Defaulted
- SR = Special ranking

=== Finals ===
Semifinals
(Bulgaria) Elitsa Kostova	7^{7}	6
(United States) Nicole Gibbs	6^{1}	4
6	(Georgia (country)) Anna Tatishvili	6	6^{2}	6
Q	(United States) Danielle Lao	3	7^{7}	3

Final
(Bulgaria) Elitsa Kostova	4	4
6	(Georgia (country)) Anna Tatishvili	6	6

=== Top half ===
First round
1	(Colombia) M Duque	1	3
(United States) L Chirico	6	6
Q	(United States) B Shankle	0	0
(Slovenia) P Rampre	6	6
(Bulgaria) E Kostova	6	6
(Czech Republic) M Borecká	3	1
PR	(Norway) U Eikeri	4	2
8	(Colombia) C Castaño	6	6
4	(United States) M Sanchez	6	7
(Greece) D Vogasari	2	5
(Mexico) M Zacarías	2	5
(United States) S Crawford	6	7
(Czech Republic) T Martincová	6	3	5
(United States) N Gibbs	0	6	7
(United States) A Muhammad	2	4
7	(United States) J Cohen	6	6

Second round
(United States) L Chirico	6	6
(Slovenia) P Rampre	1	2
(Bulgaria) E Kostova	6	6
8	(Colombia) C Castaño	1	0
4	(United States) M Sanchez	6	6
(United States) S Crawford	4	4
(United States) N Gibbs	6	6
7	(United States) J Cohen	3	3

Quarterfinals
(United States) L Chirico	6	3	1
(Bulgaria) E Kostova	3	6	6
4	(United States) M Sanchez	2	2
(United States) N Gibbs	6	6

Semifinals
(Bulgaria) E Kostova	7^{7}	6
(United States) N Gibbs	6^{1}	4

=== Bottom half ===
First round
6	(Georgia (country)) A Tatishvili	6	6
WC	(United States) J Cako	2	0
WC	(United States) R Alda	2	2
WC	(United States) J Elbaba	6	6
(United States) S Marand	4	6	6
JE	(United States) T Townsend	6	2	3
Q	(Japan) M Osaka	7	6
3	(United States) C Vandeweghe	5	1
5	(United States) M Brengle	6	6
Q	(United States) J Lawrence	2	2
WC	(United States) A Weinhold	6	4	2
(United States) C Scholl	0	6	6
Q	(United States) D Lao	6	6
(United States) J Elie	4	0
(Japan) N Osaka	6	2	6
2	(Portugal) M Larcher de Brito	1	6	3

Second round
6	(Georgia (country)) A Tatishvili	6	6
WC	(United States) J Elbaba	3	4
(United States) S Marand	6	6
Q	(Japan) M Osaka	2	3
5	(United States) M Brengle	6	6
(United States) C Scholl	1	0
Q	(United States) D Lao	2	6	6
(Japan) N Osaka	6	0	1

Quarterfinals
6	(Georgia (country)) A Tatishvili	7	6
(United States) S Marand	5	2
5	(United States) M Brengle	6^{5}	2^{r}
Q	(United States) D Lao	7^{7}	2

Semifinals
6	(Georgia (country)) A Tatishvili	6	6^{2}	6
Q	(United States) D Lao	3	7^{7}	3
