= 2019 Dubai Tennis Championships – Women's doubles =

Women's doubles
- 2019 Dubai Tennis Championships

Final
- Champions: (Chinese Taipei) Hsieh Su-wei (Czech Republic) Barbora Strýcová
- Runners-up: (Czech Republic) Lucie Hradecká (Russia) Ekaterina Makarova
- Score: 6–4, 6–4

Events
Singles	men	women
Doubles	men	women
- Dubai Tennis Championships

Women's doubles were played at the 2019 Dubai Tennis Championships at the Aviation Club Tennis Centre in Dubai, United Arab Emirates. The women's tournament took place from 17 to 23 February. Chan Hao-ching and Yang Zhaoxuan were the defending champions, but chose to participate with different partners. Chan played alongside her sister Latisha, but they lost in the semifinals to Hsieh Su-wei and Barbora Strýcová. Yang partnered Abigail Spears, but lost in the first round to Eugenie Bouchard and Sofia Kenin.

Hsieh and Strýcová went on to win the title, defeating Lucie Hradecká and Ekaterina Makarova in the final, 6–4, 6–4.

== Seeds ==
The top four seeds and the seventh seeds received a bye into the second round (the latter as the result of a late withdrawal).

1. (Hungary) Tímea Babos / (France) Kristina Mladenovic (second round)
2. (United States) Nicole Melichar / (Czech Republic) Květa Peschke (second round)
3. (Chinese Taipei) Hsieh Su-wei / (Czech Republic) Barbora Strýcová (champions)
4. (Canada) Gabriela Dabrowski / (China) Xu Yifan (quarterfinals)
5. (Australia) Samantha Stosur / (China) Zhang Shuai (withdrew)
6. (Latvia) Jeļena Ostapenko / (Czech Republic) Kateřina Siniaková (quarterfinals)
7. (Czech Republic) Lucie Hradecká / (Russia) Ekaterina Makarova (final)
8. (Germany) Anna-Lena Grönefeld / (Netherlands) Demi Schuurs (quarterfinals)
9. (Chinese Taipei) Chan Hao-ching / (Chinese Taipei) Latisha Chan (semifinals)

== Draw ==
Key

- Q = Qualifier
- WC = Wild card
- LL = Lucky loser
- Alt = Alternate
- ITF = ITF entry
- PR = Protected ranking
- SR = Special ranking
- SE = Special exempt
- JE = Junior exempt
- JR = Junior Accelerator Programme entrant
- CO = College Accelerator Programme entrant
- NG = Next Gen Accelerator Program entrant
- w/o = Walkover
- r = Retired
- d = Defaulted

=== Finals ===
Semifinals
(Spain) Lara Arruabarrena (United States) Kaitlyn Christian	2	4
7	(Czech Republic) Lucie Hradecká (Russia) Ekaterina Makarova	6	6
3	(Chinese Taipei) Hsieh Su-wei (Czech Republic) Barbora Strýcová	6	6
9	(Chinese Taipei) Chan Hao-ching (Chinese Taipei) Latisha Chan	2	1

Final
7	(Czech Republic) Lucie Hradecká (Russia) Ekaterina Makarova	4	4
3	(Chinese Taipei) Hsieh Su-wei (Czech Republic) Barbora Strýcová	6	6

=== Top half ===
First round
(Spain) L Arruabarrena (United States) K Christian	3	6	[10]
(United States) R Atawo (Slovenia) K Srebotnik	6	4	[4]
Alt	(Canada) E Bouchard (United States) S Kenin	3	7	[10]
(United States) A Spears (China) Z Yang	6	5	[8]
WC	(United States) J Elbaba (Russia) A Fomina	2	3
6	(Latvia) J Ostapenko (Czech Republic) K Siniaková	6	6
(Ukraine) N Kichenok (Russia) V Kudermetova	1	6	[6]
WC	(United Kingdom) SB Grey (United Kingdom) E Silva	6	1	[10]
(Slovenia) A Klepač (China) S Zheng	4	4
(Tunisia) O Jabeur (United States) A Riske	6	6

Second round
1	(Hungary) T Babos (France) K Mladenovic	4	6	[5]
(Spain) L Arruabarrena (United States) K Christian	6	1	[10]
Alt	(Canada) E Bouchard (United States) S Kenin
6	(Latvia) J Ostapenko (Czech Republic) K Siniaková	w/o
4	(Canada) G Dabrowski (China) Y Xu	6	6
WC	(United Kingdom) SB Grey (United Kingdom) E Silva	1	3
(Tunisia) O Jabeur (United States) A Riske
7	(Czech Republic) L Hradecká (Russia) E Makarova	w/o

Quarterfinals
(Spain) L Arruabarrena (United States) K Christian	1	6	[10]
6	(Latvia) J Ostapenko (Czech Republic) K Siniaková	6	3	[8]
4	(Canada) G Dabrowski (China) Y Xu	7^{7}	3	[3]
7	(Czech Republic) L Hradecká (Russia) E Makarova	6^{5}	6	[10]

Semifinals
(Spain) L Arruabarrena (United States) K Christian	2	4
7	(Czech Republic) L Hradecká (Russia) E Makarova	6	6

=== Bottom half ===
First round
8	(Germany) A-L Grönefeld (Netherlands) D Schuurs	6	6
(Romania) M Buzărnescu (Poland) A Rosolska	2	4
(Switzerland) B Bencic (Russia) D Kasatkina	6	4	[9]
(Romania) I Bara (Slovenia) D Jakupović	2	6	[11]
(China) X Han (Romania) M Niculescu	3	1
(Japan) M Kato (Japan) M Ninomiya	6	6
9	(Chinese Taipei) H-c Chan (Chinese Taipei) L Chan	6	6
Alt	(India) P Thombare (Netherlands) E Wacanno	2	2
(Japan) S Aoyama (Belarus) L Marozava	5	6^{4}
(Slovakia) V Kužmová (Australia) A Tomljanović	7	7^{7}
(United States) J Brady (United States) S Santamaria	4	5
(Croatia) D Jurak (Romania) R Olaru	6	7

Second round
8	(Germany) A-L Grönefeld (Netherlands) D Schuurs	6	6
(Romania) I Bara (Slovenia) D Jakupović	4	4
(Japan) M Kato (Japan) M Ninomiya	3	2
3	(Chinese Taipei) S-w Hsieh (Czech Republic) B Strýcová	6	6
9	(Chinese Taipei) H-c Chan (Chinese Taipei) L Chan	6^{5}	6	[10]
(Slovakia) V Kužmová (Australia) A Tomljanović	7^{7}	2	[3]
(Croatia) D Jurak (Romania) R Olaru	7^{8}	7^{7}
2	(United States) N Melichar (Czech Republic) K Peschke	6^{6}	6^{3}

Quarterfinals
8	(Germany) A-L Grönefeld (Netherlands) D Schuurs	2	4
3	(Chinese Taipei) S-w Hsieh (Czech Republic) B Strýcová	6	6
9	(Chinese Taipei) H-c Chan (Chinese Taipei) L Chan	6	7
(Croatia) D Jurak (Romania) R Olaru	4	5

Semifinals
3	(Chinese Taipei) S-w Hsieh (Czech Republic) B Strýcová	6	6
9	(Chinese Taipei) H-c Chan (Chinese Taipei) L Chan	2	1
