= 2016 One Love Tennis Open – Singles =

Singles
- 2016 One Love Tennis Open

Final
- Champion: (Belgium) Elise Mertens
- Runner-up: (United States) Melanie Oudin
- Score: 6–4, 6–2

Events
| Singles | Doubles |
| One Love Tennis Open | · 2017 → |

This was a new event in the ITF Women's Circuit.

Elise Mertens won the title, defeating Melanie Oudin in the final, 6–4, 6–2.

== Seeds ==
1. (Belgium) Elise Mertens (champion)
2. (United States) Taylor Townsend (second round)
3. (Netherlands) Michaëlla Krajicek (quarterfinals)
4. (Brazil) Paula Cristina Gonçalves (first round)
5. (France) Alizé Lim (second round)
6. (Paraguay) Montserrat González (second round)
7. (China) Xu Shilin (second round)
8. (France) Shérazad Reix (second round)

== Main draw ==
=== Key ===
- Q = Qualifier
- WC = Wild card
- LL = Lucky loser
- Alt = Alternate
- ITF = ITF entry
- PR = Protected ranking
- SR = Special ranking
- SE = Special exempt
- JE = Junior exempt
- JR = Junior Accelerator Programme entrant
- CO = College Accelerator Programme entrant
- NG = Next Gen Accelerator Program entrant
- w/o = Walkover
- r = Retired
- d = Defaulted

=== Finals ===
Semifinals
1 | (Belgium) Elise Mertens | 7^{11} | 6
(United States) Kristie Ahn | 6^{9} | 4
(United States) Melanie Oudin | 6 | 6
(France) Tessah Andrianjafitrimo | 4 | 1

Final
1 | (Belgium) Elise Mertens | 6 | 6
(United States) Melanie Oudin | 4 | 2

=== Top half ===
First round
1 | (Belgium) E Mertens | 6 | 6
Q | (United States) B Morgan | 3 | 0
(Finland) E Laine | 3 | 7 | 6^{3}
(United States) L Albanese | 6 | 5 | 7^{7}
(Portugal) M Larcher de Brito | 6 | 3 | 6
(Russia) V Solovyeva | 4 | 6 | 2
Q | (United States) I Neel | 6^{5} | 4
7 | (China) S Xu | 7^{7} | 6
3 | (Netherlands) M Krajicek | 6 | 6
WC | (United States) S Chang | 2 | 4
(South Africa) C Simmonds | 6 | 6
Q | (Spain) M González Encinas | 0 | 0
(United States) N Coopersmith | 6^{7} | 3
(United States) K Ahn | 7^{9} | 6
(United States) J Wacnik | 1 | 4
5 | (France) A Lim | 6 | 6

Second round
1 | (Belgium) E Mertens | 6 | 6
(United States) L Albanese | 0 | 1
(Portugal) M Larcher de Brito | 6 | 6
7 | (China) S Xu | 1 | 4
3 | (Netherlands) M Krajicek | 6 | 6
(South Africa) C Simmonds | 3 | 2
(United States) K Ahn | 7^{7} | 6
5 | (France) A Lim | 6^{4} | 2

Quarterfinals
1 | (Belgium) E Mertens | 6 | 2 | 6
(Portugal) M Larcher de Brito | 4 | 6 | 3
3 | (Netherlands) M Krajicek | 6 | 3 | 3
(United States) K Ahn | 1 | 6 | 6

Semifinals
1 | (Belgium) E Mertens | 7^{11} | 6
(United States) K Ahn | 6^{9} | 4

=== Bottom half ===
First round
6 | (Paraguay) M González | 6 | 6
WC | (United States) A Sanford | 1 | 2
(United Kingdom) L Robson | 6 | 6
WC | (United States) J Elbaba | 2 | 2
Q | (Brazil) L Stefani | 6^{4} | 3
(Mexico) M Zacarías | 7^{7} | 6
(United States) M Oudin | 6 | 3 | 7^{7}
4 | (Brazil) PC Gonçalves | 1 | 6 | 6^{2}
8 | (France) S Reix | 6 | 6
WC | (United States) A Bright | 3 | 2
(United States) E Halbauer | 6 | 1 | 4
(France) T Andrianjafitrimo | 4 | 6 | 6
(Ukraine) E Ianchuk | 6 | 6
(Argentina) N Podoroska | 3 | 1
(United States) B Pera | 3 | 6 | 1
2 | (United States) T Townsend | 6 | 1 | 6

Second round
6 | (Paraguay) M González | 7 | 0 | 4
(United Kingdom) L Robson | 5 | 6 | 6
(Mexico) M Zacarías | 3 | 3
(United States) M Oudin | 6 | 6
8 | (France) S Reix | 3 | 1
(France) T Andrianjafitrimo | 6 | 6
(Ukraine) E Ianchuk | 6 | 7
2 | (United States) T Townsend | 3 | 5

Quarterfinals
(United Kingdom) L Robson | 4 | 0
(United States) M Oudin | 6 | 6
(France) T Andrianjafitrimo | 6 | 6
(Ukraine) E Ianchuk | 4 | 4

Semifinals
(United States) M Oudin | 6 | 6
(France) T Andrianjafitrimo | 4 | 1
