= 2019 Dubai Tennis Championships – Women's singles =

Women's singles
- 2019 Dubai Tennis Championships

Final
- Champion: (Switzerland) Belinda Bencic
- Runner-up: (Czech Republic) Petra Kvitová
- Score: 6–3, 1–6, 6–2

Details
- Draw: 56
- Seeds: 16

Events
Singles	men	women
Doubles	men	women
- Dubai Tennis Championships

Belinda Bencic defeated Petra Kvitová in the final, 6–3, 1–6, 6–2 to win the women's singles tennis title at the 2019 Dubai Tennis Championships. She saved six match points en route to the title, in the third round against Aryna Sabalenka. For the second time in her career, Bencic defeated four consecutive top-10 players en route to a Premier 5 title. This was her first WTA singles title since winning the Premier 5 Rogers Cup title in 2015, and lifted her back inside the top-25 in rankings for the first time in over two and a half years.

Elina Svitolina was the two-time defending champion, but lost in the semifinals to Bencic.

== Seeds ==
The top eight seeds received a bye into the second round.

1. (Japan) Naomi Osaka (second round)
2. (Czech Republic) Petra Kvitová (final)
3. (Romania) Simona Halep (quarterfinals)
4. (Czech Republic) Karolína Plíšková (quarterfinals)
5. (Germany) Angelique Kerber (third round)
6. (Ukraine) Elina Svitolina (semifinals)
7. (Netherlands) Kiki Bertens (second round)
8. (Belarus) Aryna Sabalenka (third round)
9. (Denmark) Caroline Wozniacki (withdrew)
10. (Latvia) Anastasija Sevastova (first round)
11. (Russia) Daria Kasatkina (second round)
12. (Spain) Garbiñe Muguruza (third round)
13. (Germany) Julia Görges (first round)
14. (France) Caroline Garcia (second round)
15. (Estonia) Anett Kontaveit (first round)
16. (Belgium) Elise Mertens (first round)

== Draw ==
Key

- Q = Qualifier
- WC = Wild card
- LL = Lucky loser
- Alt = Alternate
- ITF = ITF entry
- PR = Protected ranking
- SR = Special ranking
- SE = Special exempt
- JE = Junior exempt
- JR = Junior Accelerator Programme entrant
- CO = College Accelerator Programme entrant
- NG = Next Gen Accelerator Program entrant
- w/o = Walkover
- r = Retired
- d = Defaulted

=== Finals ===
Quarterfinals
(Spain) Carla Suárez Navarro	2	3
6	(Ukraine) Elina Svitolina	6	6
3	(Romania) Simona Halep	6	4	2
(Switzerland) Belinda Bencic	4	6	6
(Chinese Taipei) Hsieh Su-wei	6	1	7
4	(Czech Republic) Karolina Plíšková	4	6	5
(Slovakia) Viktória Kužmová	4	0
2	(Czech Republic) Petra Kvitová	6	6

Semifinals
6	(Ukraine) Elina Svitolina	2	6	6^{3}
(Switzerland) Belinda Bencic	6	3	7^{7}
(Chinese Taipei) Hsieh Su-wei	6	2	4
2	(Czech Republic) Petra Kvitová	3	6	6

Final
(Switzerland) Belinda Bencic	6	1	6
2	(Czech Republic) Petra Kvitová	3	6	2

=== Top half ===
==== Section 1 ====
First round
(France) K Mladenovic	6	6
WC	(Oman) F Al-Nabhani	1	1
(Czech Republic) B Strýcová	1	3
(Spain) C Suárez Navarro	6	6
(China) S Zhang	7^{7}	6
15	(Estonia) A Kontaveit	6^{3}	3
12	(Spain) G Muguruza	4	6	6
(Ukraine) D Yastremska	6	3	3
(Australia) A Tomljanović	2	6	5
(China) S Zheng	6	4	7
(Tunisia) O Jabeur	6	7^{11}
(Croatia) D Vekić	4	6^{9}

Second round
1	(Japan) N Osaka	3	3
(France) K Mladenovic	6	6
(Spain) C Suárez Navarro	6	6
(China) S Zhang	4	4
12	(Spain) G Muguruza	7	6
(China) S Zheng	5	2
(Tunisia) O Jabeur	6^{4}	0^{r}
6	(Ukraine) E Svitolina	7^{7}	4

Third round
(France) K Mladenovic	5	5
(Spain) C Suárez Navarro	7	7
12	(Spain) G Muguruza	1	2
6	(Ukraine) E Svitolina	6	6

Quarterfinals
(Spain) C Suárez Navarro	2	3
6	(Ukraine) E Svitolina	6	6

==== Section 2 ====
First round
WC	(Canada) E Bouchard	6	6
(Belarus) V Lapko	3	4
(Ukraine) L Tsurenko	6	2
(Kazakhstan) Y Putintseva	3	0^{r}
Q	(China) L Zhu	5	6	7
16	(Belgium) E Mertens	7	4	5
LL	(Slovenia) P Hercog	3	2
LL	(Switzerland) S Vögele	6	6
(Switzerland) B Bencic	6	7^{8}
Q	(Czech Republic) L Hradecká	4	6^{6}
Q	(Serbia) I Jorović	4	6	6
WC	(Italy) S Errani	6	4	2

Second round
3	(Romania) S Halep	7^{7}	6
WC	(Canada) E Bouchard	6^{4}	4
(Ukraine) L Tsurenko	6	6^{5}	6
Q	(China) L Zhu	4	7^{7}	3
LL	(Switzerland) S Vögele	1	1
(Switzerland) B Bencic	6	6
Q	(Serbia) I Jorović	4	0
8	(Belarus) A Sabalenka	6	6

Third round
3	(Romania) S Halep	6	7
(Ukraine) L Tsurenko	3	5
(Switzerland) B Bencic	6	2	7^{9}
8	(Belarus) A Sabalenka	4	6	6^{7}

Quarterfinals
3	(Romania) S Halep	6	4	2
(Switzerland) B Bencic	4	6	6

=== Bottom half ===
==== Section 3 ====
First round
LL	(Slovenia) D Jakupović	1	6	6
Q	(Kazakhstan) Z Diyas	6	1	2
(Russia) E Makarova	6	5	4
(Belarus) A Sasnovich	0	7	6
(Chinese Taipei) S-w Hsieh	6	6
10	(Latvia) A Sevastova	4	2
13	(Germany) J Görges	4	5
(United States) A Riske	6	7
(France) A Cornet	6	6
(Hungary) T Babos	4	3
Q	(Spain) L Arruabarrena	7	1	2
(Slovakia) D Cibulková	5	6	6

Second round
5	(Germany) A Kerber	7^{7}	6
LL	(Slovenia) D Jakupović	6^{4}	3
(Belarus) A Sasnovich	1	2
(Chinese Taipei) S-w Hsieh	6	6
(United States) A Riske	6	6
(France) A Cornet	2	3
(Slovakia) D Cibulková	2	6	3
4	(Czech Republic) Ka Plíšková	6	3	6

Third round
5	(Germany) A Kerber	7	4	0
(Chinese Taipei) S-w Hsieh	5	6	6
(United States) A Riske	6^{3}	6^{5}
4	(Czech Republic) Ka Plíšková	7^{7}	7^{7}

Quarterfinals
(Chinese Taipei) S-w Hsieh	6	1	7
4	(Czech Republic) Ka Plíšková	4	6	5

==== Section 4 ====
First round
(Slovakia) V Kužmová	7^{7}	7^{7}
Q	(United States) B Pera	6^{2}	6^{3}
(United States) S Kenin	6	6
(Romania) M Buzărnescu	3	0
Q	(Poland) M Fręch	3	6	4
11	(Russia) D Kasatkina	6	3	6
14	(France) C Garcia	6	6
(Russia) A Pavlyuchenkova	2	0
Q	(United States) J Brady	6	6
(Latvia) J Ostapenko	4	0
(Czech Republic) K Siniaková	6	6
(Croatia) P Martić	4	3

Second round
7	(Netherlands) K Bertens	2	6	6^{6}
(Slovakia) V Kužmová	6	4	7^{8}
(United States) S Kenin	6	2	6
11	(Russia) D Kasatkina	3	6	4
14	(France) C Garcia	4	5
Q	(United States) J Brady	6	7
(Czech Republic) K Siniaková	7^{7}	4	4
2	(Czech Republic) P Kvitová	6^{3}	6	6

Third round
(Slovakia) V Kužmová	1	7	6
(United States) S Kenin	6	5	2
Q	(United States) J Brady	5	6	3
2	(Czech Republic) P Kvitová	7	1	6

Quarterfinals
(Slovakia) V Kužmová	4	0
2	(Czech Republic) P Kvitová	6	6

== Qualifying ==
=== Seeds ===
1. (United States) Bernarda Pera (qualified)
2. (Switzerland) Stefanie Vögele (qualifying competition, lucky loser)
3. (Slovenia) Dalila Jakupović (qualifying competition, lucky loser)
4. (Slovenia) Polona Hercog (qualifying competition, lucky loser)
5. (Czech Republic) Kristýna Plíšková (first round)
6. (Spain) Lara Arruabarrena (qualified)
7. (Kazakhstan) Zarina Diyas (qualified)
8. (Russia) Veronika Kudermetova (withdrew, still playing in Doha)
9. (Hungary) Tímea Babos (moved to main draw)
10. (Romania) Monica Niculescu (qualifying competition)
11. (China) Zhu Lin (qualified)
12. (Serbia) Ivana Jorović (qualified)
13. (United States) Jennifer Brady (qualified)
14. (Japan) Misaki Doi (qualifying competition)
15. (Ukraine) Anhelina Kalinina (qualifying competition)
16. (Uzbekistan) Sabina Sharipova (first round)

=== Qualifiers ===
1. (United States) Bernarda Pera
2. (Serbia) Ivana Jorović
3. (United States) Jennifer Brady
4. (Czech Republic) Lucie Hradecká
5. (China) Zhu Lin
6. (Spain) Lara Arruabarrena
7. (Kazakhstan) Zarina Diyas
8. (Poland) Magdalena Fręch

=== Lucky losers ===
1. (Slovenia) Dalila Jakupović
2. (Switzerland) Stefanie Vögele
3. (Slovenia) Polona Hercog

=== Draw ===
==== First qualifier ====
First round
1	(United States) Bernarda Pera	6	6
WC	(United States) Nikita Uberoi	1	0
(United States) Asia Muhammad	3	3
15	(Ukraine) Anhelina Kalinina	6	6

Qualifying competition
1	(United States) Bernarda Pera	4	6	6
15	(Ukraine) Anhelina Kalinina	6	3	2

==== Second qualifier ====
First round
2	(Switzerland) Stefanie Vögele	6	6
(China) Xu Shilin	1	0
(Ukraine) Valeriya Strakhova	0	0
12	(Serbia) Ivana Jorović	6	6

Qualifying competition
2	(Switzerland) Stefanie Vögele	4	4
12	(Serbia) Ivana Jorović	6	6

==== Third qualifier ====
First round
3	(Slovenia) Dalila Jakupović	7^{7}	6
(France) Chloé Paquet	6^{3}	3
(Romania) Alexandra Dulgheru	2	5
13	(United States) Jennifer Brady	6	7

Qualifying competition
3	(Slovenia) Dalila Jakupović	0	3
13	(United States) Jennifer Brady	6	6

==== Fourth qualifier ====
First round
4	(Slovenia) Polona Hercog	5	7^{9}	6
WC	(United States) Julia Elbaba	7	6^{7}	3
WC	(United Kingdom) Eden Silva	6	2	1
Alt	(Czech Republic) Lucie Hradecká	2	6	6

Qualifying competition
4	(Slovenia) Polona Hercog	6	5	0
Alt	(Czech Republic) Lucie Hradecká	2	7	6

==== Fifth qualifier ====
First round
5	(Czech Republic) Kristýna Plíšková	4	2
(Russia) Liudmila Samsonova	6	6
(Romania) Irina Bara	7	0	5
11	(China) Zhu Lin	5	6	7

Qualifying competition
(Russia) Liudmila Samsonova	3	4
11	(China) Zhu Lin	6	6

==== Sixth qualifier ====
First round
6	(Spain) Lara Arruabarrena	6	6
(Croatia) Tereza Mrdeža	3	2
(Canada) Gabriela Dabrowski	6	6
16	(Uzbekistan) Sabina Sharipova	2	1

Qualifying competition
6	(Spain) Lara Arruabarrena	6	6
(Canada) Gabriela Dabrowski	4	3

==== Seventh qualifier ====
First round
7	(Kazakhstan) Zarina Diyas	6	6
WC	(Germany) Sabine Lisicki	1	2
(India) Ankita Raina	1	1
10	(Romania) Monica Niculescu	6	6

Qualifying competition
7	(Kazakhstan) Zarina Diyas	6	6
10	(Romania) Monica Niculescu	4	4

==== Eighth qualifier ====
First round
Alt	(Croatia) Darija Jurak	3	1
(Poland) Magdalena Fręch	6	6
(China) Han Xinyun	4	6	0
14	(Japan) Misaki Doi	6	3	6

Qualifying competition
(Poland) Magdalena Fręch	4	6	6
14	(Japan) Misaki Doi	6	3	1
