= 2013 John Newcombe Women's Pro Challenge – Doubles =

Doubles
- 2013 John Newcombe Women's Pro Challenge

Final
- Champions: (Georgia (country)) Anna Tatishvili (United States) Coco Vandeweghe
- Runners-up: (United States) Asia Muhammad (United States) Taylor Townsend
- Score: 3–6, 6–3, [13–11]

Events
Singles	Doubles
← 2012 ·	John Newcombe Women's Pro Challenge	· 2014 →

Elena Bovina and Mirjana Lučić-Baroni were the defending champions, having won the event in 2012, but both chose not to participate in 2013.

Anna Tatishvili and Coco Vandeweghe won the title, defeating Asia Muhammad and Taylor Townsend in the final, 3–6, 6–3, [13–11].

== Seeds ==
1. (Georgia (country)) Anna Tatishvili / (United States) Coco Vandeweghe (champion)
2. (United States) Asia Muhammad / (United States) Taylor Townsend (final)
3. (Colombia) Catalina Castaño / (Bulgaria) Elitsa Kostova (first round)
4. (United States) Madison Brengle / (United States) Julia Cohen (first round)

== Draw ==
=== Key ===
- Q = Qualifier
- WC = Wild card
- LL = Lucky loser
- Alt = Alternate
- ITF = ITF entry
- PR = Protected ranking
- SR = Special ranking
- SE = Special exempt
- JE = Junior exempt
- JR = Junior Accelerator Programme entrant
- CO = College Accelerator Programme entrant
- NG = Next Gen Accelerator Program entrant
- w/o = Walkover
- r = Retired
- d = Defaulted

First round
1	(Georgia (country)) A Tatishvili (United States) C Vandeweghe	6	6
WC	(United States) T Fumagalli (United States) V Yu	2	1
(Czech Republic) M Borecká (Czech Republic) T Martincová	4	4
(Norway) U Eikeri (Mexico) M Zacarías	6	6
3	(Colombia) C Castaño (Bulgaria) E Kostova	6	4	[2]
(United States) L Chirico (United States) S Crawford	3	6	[10]
(United States) S Marand (United States) A Weinhold	6	6
(United States) E Lumpkin (United States) C Scholl	4	2
(United States) R Alda (United States) E Turner	2	6	[8]
(United States) J Elie (United States) N Pluskota	6	4	[10]
(United States) N Gibbs (United States) M Sanchez	6	4	[10]
4	(United States) M Brengle (United States) J Cohen	4	6	[3]
(United States) A Bhargava (United States) K Wong	6	3	[9]
WC	(United States) J Cako (United States) D Lao	2	6	[11]
(United States) K Boxx (New Zealand) A Guthrie	4	4
2	(United States) A Muhammad (United States) T Townsend	6	6

Quarterfinals
1	(Georgia (country)) A Tatishvili (United States) C Vandeweghe	6	6
(Norway) U Eikeri (Mexico) M Zacarías	1	1
(United States) L Chirico (United States) S Crawford	1	1
(United States) S Marand (United States) A Weinhold	6	6
(United States) J Elie (United States) N Pluskota	6^{1}	1
(United States) N Gibbs (United States) M Sanchez	7^{7}	6
WC	(United States) J Cako (United States) D Lao	7^{7}	4	[10]
2	(United States) A Muhammad (United States) T Townsend	6^{3}	6	[12]

Semifinals
1	(Georgia (country)) A Tatishvili (United States) C Vandeweghe	6	6
(United States) S Marand (United States) A Weinhold	3	3
(United States) N Gibbs (United States) M Sanchez	0	1
2	(United States) A Muhammad (United States) T Townsend	6	6

Final
1	(Georgia (country)) A Tatishvili (United States) C Vandeweghe	3	6	[13]
2	(United States) A Muhammad (United States) T Townsend	6	3	[11]
