= 2014 John Newcombe Women's Pro Challenge – Singles =

Singles
- 2014 John Newcombe Women's Pro Challenge

Final
- Champion: (United States) Irina Falconi
- Runner-up: (United States) Jennifer Brady
- Score: 7–6^{(7–3)}, 6–2

Events
Singles	Doubles
← 2013 ·	John Newcombe Women's Pro Challenge	· 2015 →

Anna Tatishvili was the defending champion, but lost in the first round to Bernarda Pera.

Irina Falconi won the title, defeating Jennifer Brady in the final, 7–6^{(7–3)}, 6–2.

== Seeds ==
1. (United States) Anna Tatishvili (first round)
2. (United States) Grace Min (quarterfinals)
3. (Australia) Olivia Rogowska (second round)
4. (Portugal) Michelle Larcher de Brito (second round)
5. (Colombia) Mariana Duque (second round)
6. (United States) Irina Falconi (champion)
7. (Paraguay) Verónica Cepede Royg (first round)
8. (United States) ~~Melanie Oudin~~ (withdrew)
9. (United States) Louisa Chirico (second round)

== Main draw ==
=== Key ===
- Q = Qualifier
- WC = Wild card
- LL = Lucky loser
- Alt = Alternate
- SE = Special exempt
- PR = Protected ranking
- ITF = ITF entry
- JE = Junior exempt
- w/o = Walkover
- r = Retired
- d = Defaulted
- SR = Special ranking

=== Finals ===
Semifinals
6	(United States) Irina Falconi	6	6
(United States) Julia Boserup	3	2
(Japan) Mayo Hibi	4	4
(United States) Jennifer Brady	6	6

Final
6	(United States) Irina Falconi	7^{7}	6
(United States) Jennifer Brady	6^{3}	2

=== Top half ===
First round
1	(United States) A Tatishvili	6^{7}	3
WC	(United States) B Pera	7^{9}	6
SE	(Ukraine) K Bondarenko	1	4
(France) M Johansson	6	6
(Russia) M Melnikova	3	7	1
LL	(Czech Republic) N Vaidišová	6	5	6
WC	(United States) R Anderson	7	4	5
6	(United States) I Falconi	5	6	7
3	(Australia) O Rogowska	6	6
(United States) S Crawford	2	4
(United States) J Boserup	7	6
(Brazil) G Cé	5	2
WC	(United States) A Glatch	6	4	6
Q	(United States) J Elbaba	4	6	0
(Croatia) P Martić	7^{12}	6^{3}	7^{7}
7	(Paraguay) V Cepede Royg	6^{10}	7^{7}	6^{3}

Second round
WC	(United States) B Pera	4	3
(France) M Johansson	6	6
LL	(Czech Republic) N Vaidišová	4	4
6	(United States) I Falconi	6	6
3	(Australia) O Rogowska	3	6^{6}
(United States) J Boserup	6	7^{8}
WC	(United States) A Glatch	6	6
(Croatia) P Martić	4	4

Quarterfinals
(France) M Johansson	5	6	0
6	(United States) I Falconi	7	3	6
(United States) J Boserup	6	4	6
WC	(United States) A Glatch	4	6	4

Semifinals
6	(United States) I Falconi	6	6
(United States) J Boserup	3	2

=== Bottom half ===
First round
9	(United States) L Chirico	6	7
(Belarus) I Kremen	4	5
(Japan) M Hibi	6	6
Q	(Italy) G Sanesi	4	2
(United States) S Vickery	2	6^{2}
(Brazil) PC Gonçalves	6	7^{7}
(Latvia) D Marcinkēviča	6^{5}	3
4	(Portugal) M Larcher de Brito	7^{7}	6
5	(Colombia) M Duque	0	6	6
Q	(United States) K Ahn	6	4	4
(Japan) N Osaka	4	4
(United States) J Brady	6	6
(United States) A Muhammad	3	6	1
Q	(Romania) E Gallovits-Hall	6	1	6
(United States) S Marand	4	1
2	(United States) G Min	6	6

Second round
9	(United States) L Chirico	4	6	3
(Japan) M Hibi	6	3	6
(Brazil) PC Gonçalves	7	6^{6}	6
4	(Portugal) M Larcher de Brito	5	7^{8}	4
5	(Colombia) M Duque	3	4
(United States) J Brady	6	6
Q	(Romania) E Gallovits-Hall	4	1
2	(United States) G Min	6	6

Quarterfinals
(Japan) M Hibi	6	6
(Brazil) PC Gonçalves	2	4
(United States) J Brady	7	6
2	(United States) G Min	5	2

Semifinals
(Japan) M Hibi	4	4
(United States) J Brady	6	6
