= 2016 One Love Tennis Open – Doubles =

Doubles
- 2016 One Love Tennis Open

Final
- Champions: (United States) Ingrid Neel (Brazil) Luisa Stefani
- Runners-up: (United States) Alexandra Stevenson (United States) Taylor Townsend
- Score: 4–6, 6–4, [10–5]

Events
Singles	Doubles
← 2015 ·	One Love Tennis Open	· 2017 →

This was a new event in the ITF Women's Circuit.

Ingrid Neel and Luisa Stefani won the title, defeating Alexandra Stevenson and Taylor Townsend in the final, 4–6, 6–4, [10–5].

== Seeds ==
1. (Belgium) Elise Mertens / (United States) Keri Wong (quarterfinals)
2. (Brazil) Paula Cristina Gonçalves / (France) Alizé Lim (first round)
3. (Netherlands) Michaëlla Krajicek / (United States) Melanie Oudin (first round)
4. (Paraguay) Montserrat González / (Argentina) Nadia Podoroska (first round, withdrew)

== Draw ==
=== Key ===
- Q = Qualifier
- WC = Wild card
- LL = Lucky loser
- Alt = Alternate
- ITF = ITF entry
- PR = Protected ranking
- SR = Special ranking
- SE = Special exempt
- JE = Junior exempt
- JR = Junior Accelerator Programme entrant
- CO = College Accelerator Programme entrant
- NG = Next Gen Accelerator Program entrant
- w/o = Walkover
- r = Retired
- d = Defaulted

First round
1	(Belgium) E Mertens (United States) K Wong	7	6
(South Africa) C Simmonds (Mexico) M Zacarías	5	2
(United States) K Ahn (United States) Q Gleason	4	6	[13]
(United States) A Stevenson (United States) T Townsend	6	3	[15]
3	(Netherlands) M Krajicek (United States) M Oudin	5	6^{2}
(Ukraine) E Ianchuk (France) S Reix	7	7^{7}
WC	(United States) A Anghelescu (United States) K Woodard	6	7
(United States) S Chang (United States) A Mueller	4	5
(United States) B Boren (Mexico) S León	4	2
(United States) I Neel (Brazil) L Stefani	6	6
WC	(United States) N Coopersmith (United States) S Nemtsova	w/o
4	(Paraguay) M González (Argentina) N Podoroska
(Samoa) S Carruthers (United States) J Wacnik	6^{6}	5
(Finland) E Laine (United States) B Pera	7^{8}	7
WC	(United States) J Elbaba (United States) E Halbauer	6	6
2	(Brazil) PC Gonçalves (France) A Lim	4	0

Quarterfinals
1	(Belgium) E Mertens (United States) K Wong	6	1	[7]
(United States) A Stevenson (United States) T Townsend	2	6	[10]
(Ukraine) E Ianchuk (France) S Reix	6	7
WC	(United States) A Anghelescu (United States) K Woodard	4	5
(United States) I Neel (Brazil) L Stefani	6	6
WC	(United States) N Coopersmith (United States) S Nemtsova	1	1
(Finland) E Laine (United States) B Pera	5	1
WC	(United States) J Elbaba (United States) E Halbauer	7	6

Semifinals
(United States) A Stevenson (United States) T Townsend	6	6
(Ukraine) E Ianchuk (France) S Reix	1	2
(United States) I Neel (Brazil) L Stefani	6	6
WC	(United States) J Elbaba (United States) E Halbauer	2	4

Final
(United States) A Stevenson (United States) T Townsend	6	4	[5]
(United States) I Neel (Brazil) L Stefani	4	6	[10]
