= 2014 John Newcombe Women's Pro Challenge – Doubles =

Doubles
- 2014 John Newcombe Women's Pro Challenge

Final
- Champions: (Paraguay) Verónica Cepede Royg (Colombia) Mariana Duque
- Runners-up: (United States) Alexa Glatch (United States) Bernarda Pera
- Score: 6–0, 6–3

Events
Singles	Doubles
← 2013 ·	John Newcombe Women's Pro Challenge	· 2015 →

Anna Tatishvili and Coco Vandeweghe were the defending champions, but Vandeweghe chose not to participate. Tatishvili partnered Marina Melnikova but lost in the first round to Alexa Glatch and Bernarda Pera.

Verónica Cepede Royg and Mariana Duque won the title, defeating Alexa Glatch and Bernarda Pera in the final, 6–0, 6–3.

== Seeds ==
1. (United States) Asia Muhammad / (Australia) Olivia Rogowska (first round)
2. (Paraguay) Verónica Cepede Royg / (Colombia) Mariana Duque (champions)
3. (United States) Irina Falconi / (Croatia) Petra Martić (semifinals)
4. (Russia) Marina Melnikova / (United States) Anna Tatishvili (first round)

== Draw ==
=== Key ===
- Q = Qualifier
- WC = Wild card
- LL = Lucky loser
- Alt = Alternate
- ITF = ITF entry
- PR = Protected ranking
- SR = Special ranking
- SE = Special exempt
- JE = Junior exempt
- JR = Junior Accelerator Programme entrant
- CO = College Accelerator Programme entrant
- NG = Next Gen Accelerator Program entrant
- w/o = Walkover
- r = Retired
- d = Defaulted

First round
1	(United States) A Muhammad (Australia) O Rogowska	3	4
(Ukraine) K Bondarenko (Latvia) D Marcinkēviča	6	6
(United States) D Lao (United States) K Wong	6	6
(Brazil) MF Alves (Dominican Republic) F Segarelli	2	4
4	(Russia) M Melnikova (United States) A Tatishvili	2	3
(United States) A Glatch (United States) B Pera	6	6
WC	(United States) K Traxler (United States) E Turner	6	3	[7]
(United States) J Brady (United States) L Embree	2	6	[10]
(Brazil) G Cé (Brazil) B Haddad Maia	7	1	[10]
(United States) L Chirico (United States) S Marand	5	6	[6]
WC	(United States) T Fumagalli (United States) V Yu	2	1
3	(United States) I Falconi (Croatia) P Martić	6	6
(United States) J Cako (Romania) C Stancu	3	7	[14]
(Belarus) I Kremen (Japan) N Osaka	6	5	[12]
(United States) K Pathumanun Hearn (Australia) K Wlodarczak	3	0
2	(Paraguay) V Cepede Royg (Colombia) M Duque	6	6

Quarterfinals
(Ukraine) K Bondarenko (Latvia) D Marcinkēviča	6	6
(United States) D Lao (United States) K Wong	1	3
(United States) A Glatch (United States) B Pera	6	6
(United States) J Brady (United States) L Embree	0	2
(Brazil) G Cé (Brazil) B Haddad Maia	4	2
3	(United States) I Falconi (Croatia) P Martić	6	6
(United States) J Cako (Romania) C Stancu	2	0
2	(Paraguay) V Cepede Royg (Colombia) M Duque	6	6

Semifinals
(Ukraine) K Bondarenko (Latvia) D Marcinkēviča	6	3	[4]
(United States) A Glatch (United States) B Pera	3	6	[10]
3	(United States) I Falconi (Croatia) P Martić	4	3
2	(Paraguay) V Cepede Royg (Colombia) M Duque	6	6

Final
(United States) A Glatch (United States) B Pera	0	3
2	(Paraguay) V Cepede Royg (Colombia) M Duque	6	6
