= 2012 John Newcombe Women's Pro Challenge =

- Date: 29 October–4 November
- Edition: 1st
- Location: New Braunfels, Texas, United States

Champions

Singles
- (United States) Melanie Oudin

Doubles
- (Russia) Elena Bovina / (Croatia) Mirjana Lučić
- John Newcombe Women's Pro Challenge

The 2012 John Newcombe Women's Pro Challenge was a professional tennis tournament played on outdoor hard courts. It was the first edition of the tournament which was part of the 2012 ITF Women's Circuit. It took place in New Braunfels, Texas, United States, on 29 October–4 November 2012.

== WTA entrants ==
=== Seeds ===
Country	Player	Rank^{1}	Seed
ITA	Camila Giorgi	77	1
USA	Lauren Davis	88	2
USA	Melanie Oudin	98	3
CRO	Mirjana Lučić	109	4
POR	Michelle Larcher de Brito	113	5
COL	Mariana Duque	170	6
USA	Madison Keys	173	7
USA	Chichi Scholl	174	8

- ^{1} Rankings are as of 22 October 2012.

=== Other entrants ===
The following players received wildcards into the singles main draw:

- (United States) Rosalia Alda
- (United States) Victoria Duval
- (United States) Yasmin Schnack

The following players received entry from the qualifying draw:

- (United States) Lauren Albanese
- (United States) Sanaz Marand
- (Croatia) Jelena Pandžić
- (United States) Taylor Townsend

The following players received entry as Lucky Losers:

- (United States) Natalie Pluskota
- (Indonesia) Romana Tedjakusuma

== Champions ==
=== Singles ===
- (United States) Melanie Oudin def. (Colombia) Mariana Duque 6–1, 6–1.

=== Doubles ===
- (Russia) Elena Bovina / (Croatia) Mirjana Lučić def. (Colombia) Mariana Duque / (Venezuela) Adriana Pérez 6–3, 4–6, [10–8].
