= 2019 Dubai Tennis Championships =

- Date: 17–23 February (women); 25 February – 2 March (men)
- Edition: 27th (men) / 19th (women)
- Category: ATP Tour 500 (men); WTA Premier 5 (women)
- Draw: 32S / 16D (men); 56S / 28D (women)
- Prize money: $2,887,895 (ATP) $2,828,000 (WTA)
- Surface: Hard, Outdoor
- Location: Dubai, United Arab Emirates
- Venue: Aviation Club Tennis Centre

Champions

Men's singles
- (Switzerland) Roger Federer

Women's singles
- (Switzerland) Belinda Bencic

Men's doubles
- (United States) Rajeev Ram / (United Kingdom) Joe Salisbury

Women's doubles
- (Chinese Taipei) Hsieh Su-wei / (Czech Republic) Barbora Strýcová
- Dubai Tennis Championships

The 2019 Dubai Tennis Championships (also known as the Dubai Duty Free Tennis Championships for sponsorship reasons) was an ATP Tour 500 event on the 2019 ATP Tour and a WTA Premier 5 event on the 2019 WTA Tour. Both events were held at the Aviation Club Tennis Centre in Dubai, United Arab Emirates. The women's tournament took place from 17 to 23 February and the men's tournament from 25 February–2 March.

== Points and prize money ==
=== Point distribution ===
| Event | W | F | SF | QF | Round of 16 | Round of 32 | Round of 56 | Q | Q2 | Q1 |
| Men's singles | 500 | 300 | 180 | 90 | 45 | 0 | —N/a | 20 | 10 | 0 |
| Men's doubles | 500 | 300 | 180 | 90 | 0 | —N/a | —N/a | 45 | 25 | 0 |
| Women's singles | 900 | 585 | 350 | 190 | 105 | 60 | 1 | 30 | 20 | 1 |
| Women's doubles | 900 | 585 | 350 | 190 | 105 | 1 | —N/a | —N/a | —N/a | —N/a |

=== Prize money ===
| Event | W | F | SF | QF | Round of 16 | Round of 32 | Round of 56 | Q2 | Q1 |
| Men's singles | $523,330 | $256,565 | $129,100 | $65,655 | $34,100 | $17,980 | —N/a | $3,980 | $2,030 |
| Men's doubles* | $157,570 | $77,140 | $38,690 | $19,860 | $10,270 | —N/a | —N/a | —N/a | —N/a |
| Women's singles | $520,615 | $260,310 | $130,030 | $59,960 | $29,695 | $15,240 | $7,835 | $4,360 | $2,245 |
| Women's doubles* | $148,845 | $75,310 | $37,275 | $18,765 | $9,510 | $4,695 | —N/a | —N/a | —N/a |

_{*per team}

== ATP singles main-draw entrants ==
=== Seeds ===
| Country | Player | Ranking^{1} | Seed |
|---|---|---|---|
| JPN | Kei Nishikori | 6 | 1 |
| SUI | Roger Federer | 7 | 2 |
| CRO | Marin Čilić | 10 | 3 |
| RUS | Karen Khachanov | 11 | 4 |
| GRE | Stefanos Tsitsipas | 12 | 5 |
| CRO | Borna Ćorić | 13 | 6 |
| CAN | Milos Raonic | 14 | 7 |
| RUS | Daniil Medvedev | 15 | 8 |

- Rankings are as of February 18, 2019.

=== Other entrants ===
The following players received wildcards into the singles main draw:

- (Cyprus) Marcos Baghdatis
- (India) Ramkumar Ramanathan
- (Egypt) Mohamed Safwat

The following players received entry from the qualifying

- (Lithuania) Ričardas Berankis
- (Italy) Thomas Fabbiano
- (Belarus) Egor Gerasimov
- (France) Corentin Moutet

The following players received entry as lucky losers:

- (Belarus) Ilya Ivashka
- (Czech Republic) Jiří Veselý

=== Withdrawals ===
- (Slovenia) Aljaž Bedene → replaced by (Belarus) Ilya Ivashka
- (South Korea) Chung Hyeon → replaced by (France) Benoît Paire
- (France) Pierre-Hugues Herbert → replaced by (United States) Denis Kudla
- (Kazakhstan) Mikhail Kukushkin → replaced by (Czech Republic) Jiří Veselý
- (United Kingdom) Andy Murray → replaced by (Netherlands) Robin Haase

== ATP doubles main-draw entrants ==
=== Seeds ===
| Country | Player | Country | Player | Rank^{1} | Seed |
|---|---|---|---|---|---|
| AUT | Oliver Marach | CRO | Mate Pavić | 16 | 1 |
| RSA | Raven Klaasen | NZL | Michael Venus | 26 | 2 |
| FIN | Henri Kontinen | AUS | John Peers | 35 | 3 |
| USA | Rajeev Ram | GBR | Joe Salisbury | 45 | 4 |

- Rankings are as of February 18, 2019.

=== Other entrants ===
The following pairs received wildcards into the doubles main draw:

- (India) Leander Paes / (France) Benoît Paire
- (Austria) Jürgen Melzer / (Serbia) Nenad Zimonjić

The following pair received entry from the qualifying draw:

- (India) Jeevan Nedunchezhiyan / (India) Purav Raja

== WTA singles main-draw entrants ==
=== Seeds ===
| Country | Player | Ranking^{1} | Seed |
|---|---|---|---|
| JPN | Naomi Osaka | 1 | 1 |
| CZE | Petra Kvitová | 2 | 2 |
| ROU | Simona Halep | 3 | 3 |
| CZE | Karolína Plíšková | 5 | 4 |
| GER | Angelique Kerber | 6 | 5 |
| UKR | Elina Svitolina | 7 | 6 |
| NED | Kiki Bertens | 8 | 7 |
| BLR | Aryna Sabalenka | 9 | 8 |
| ~~DEN~~ | ~~Caroline Wozniacki~~ | ~~10~~ | ~~9~~ |
| LAT | Anastasija Sevastova | 12 | 10 |
| RUS | Daria Kasatkina | 14 | 11 |
| ESP | Garbiñe Muguruza | 15 | 12 |
| GER | Julia Görges | 16 | 13 |
| FRA | Caroline Garcia | 19 | 14 |
| EST | Anett Kontaveit | 20 | 15 |
| BEL | Elise Mertens | 21 | 16 |

- Rankings are as of February 11, 2019.

=== Other entrants ===
The following players received wildcards into the singles main draw:

- (Oman) Fatma Al-Nabhani
- (Canada) Eugenie Bouchard
- (Italy) Sara Errani
- ~~(Australia) Samantha Stosur~~

The following players received entry from the qualifying draw:

- (Spain) Lara Arruabarrena
- (United States) Jennifer Brady
- (Kazakhstan) Zarina Diyas
- (Poland) Magdalena Fręch
- (Czech Republic) Lucie Hradecká
- (Serbia) Ivana Jorović
- (United States) Bernarda Pera
- (China) Zhu Lin

The following players received entry as lucky losers:

- (Slovenia) Polona Hercog
- (Slovenia) Dalila Jakupović
- (Switzerland) Stefanie Vögele

=== Withdrawals ===
==== Before the tournament ====
- (Australia) Ashleigh Barty → replaced by (Tunisia) Ons Jabeur
- (United States) Danielle Collins → replaced by (Russia) Ekaterina Makarova
- (Italy) Camila Giorgi → replaced by (Slovenia) Dalila Jakupović
- (United States) Madison Keys → replaced by (Ukraine) Dayana Yastremska
- (Greece) Maria Sakkari → replaced by (Hungary) Tímea Babos
- (Australia) Samantha Stosur → replaced by (Switzerland) Stefanie Vögele
- (China) Wang Qiang → replaced by (Belarus) Vera Lapko
- (Denmark) Caroline Wozniacki → replaced by (Slovenia) Polona Hercog

=== Retirements ===
- (Tunisia) Ons Jabeur (right shoulder injury)
- (Kazakhstan) Yulia Putintseva (low back injury)

== WTA doubles main-draw entrants ==
=== Seeds ===
| Country | Player | Country | Player | Rank^{1} | Seed |
|---|---|---|---|---|---|
| HUN | Tímea Babos | FRA | Kristina Mladenovic | 6 | 1 |
| USA | Nicole Melichar | CZE | Květa Peschke | 24 | 2 |
| TPE | Hsieh Su-wei | CZE | Barbora Strýcová | 27 | 3 |
| CAN | Gabriela Dabrowski | CHN | Xu Yifan | 28 | 4 |
| ~~AUS~~ | ~~Samantha Stosur~~ | ~~CHN~~ | ~~Zhang Shuai~~ | ~~33~~ | ~~5~~ |
| LAT | Jeļena Ostapenko | CZE | Kateřina Siniaková | 38 | 6 |
| CZE | Lucie Hradecká | RUS | Ekaterina Makarova | 38 | 7 |
| GER | Anna-Lena Grönefeld | NED | Demi Schuurs | 40 | 8 |
| TPE | Chan Hao-ching | TPE | Latisha Chan | 41 | 9 |

- Rankings are as of February 11, 2019.

=== Other entrants ===
The following pairs received a wildcard into the doubles main draw:

- (United States) Julia Elbaba / (Russia) Alena Fomina
- (United Kingdom) Sarah Beth Grey / (United Kingdom) Eden Silva

The following pairs received entry as alternates:

- (Canada) Eugenie Bouchard / (United States) Sofia Kenin
- (India) Prarthana Thombare / (Netherlands) Eva Wacanno

=== Withdrawals ===
Before the tournament

- (Belgium) Elise Mertens (left hip injury)
- (Latvia) Anastasija Sevastova (low back injury)
- (Australia) Samantha Stosur (personal reasons)

During the tournament

- (Canada) Eugenie Bouchard (left abdominal injury)
- (Tunisia) Ons Jabeur (right shoulder injury)

== Champions ==
=== Men's singles ===
- (Switzerland) Roger Federer def. (Greece) Stefanos Tsitsipas, 6–4, 6–4

=== Women's singles ===
- (Switzerland) Belinda Bencic def. (Czech Republic) Petra Kvitová, 6–3, 1–6, 6–2

=== Men's doubles ===
- (United States) Rajeev Ram / (United Kingdom) Joe Salisbury def. (Japan) Ben McLachlan / (Germany) Jan-Lennard Struff, 7–6^{(7–4)}, 6–4

=== Women's doubles ===
- (Chinese Taipei) Hsieh Su-wei / (Czech Republic) Barbora Strýcová def. (Czech Republic) Lucie Hradecká / (Russia) Ekaterina Makarova, 6–4, 6–4
