= 2018 Qatar Total Open – Doubles =

Doubles
- 2018 Qatar Total Open

Final
- Champions: (Canada) Gabriela Dabrowski (Latvia) Jeļena Ostapenko
- Runners-up: (Slovenia) Andreja Klepač (Spain) María José Martínez Sánchez
- Score: 6–3, 6–3

Events
Singles	Doubles
← 2017 ·	Qatar Total Open	· 2019 →

Abigail Spears and Katarina Srebotnik were the defending champions, but chose not to compete together. Spears played alongside Alicja Rosolska, but lost in the first round to Mihaela Buzărnescu and Alizé Cornet. Srebotnik teamed up with Shuko Aoyama, but lost in the first round to Anastasia Pavlyuchenkova and Olga Savchuk.

Gabriela Dabrowski and Jeļena Ostapenko won the title, defeating Andreja Klepač and María José Martínez Sánchez in the final, 6–3, 6–3.

== Seeds ==
The top four seeds received a bye into the second round.

1. (Russia) Ekaterina Makarova / (Russia) Elena Vesnina (quarterfinals)
2. (Chinese Taipei) Latisha Chan / (Czech Republic) Andrea Sestini Hlaváčková (second round)
3. (Czech Republic) Lucie Šafářová / (Czech Republic) Barbora Strýcová (second round, retired)
4. (Hungary) Tímea Babos / (France) Kristina Mladenovic (quarterfinals)
5. (Chinese Taipei) Hsieh Su-wei / (China) Peng Shuai (first round)
6. (Romania) Irina-Camelia Begu / (Romania) Monica Niculescu (withdrew)
7. (Chinese Taipei) Chan Hao-ching / (China) Yang Zhaoxuan (second round)
8. (Slovenia) Andreja Klepač / (Spain) María José Martínez Sánchez (final)

== Draw ==
=== Key ===
- Q = Qualifier
- WC = Wild card
- LL = Lucky loser
- Alt = Alternate
- SE = Special exempt
- PR = Protected ranking
- ITF = ITF entry
- JE = Junior exempt
- w/o = Walkover
- r = Retired
- d = Defaulted
- SR = Special ranking

=== Finals ===
Semifinals
(Australia) Monique Adamczak (Ukraine) Lyudmyla Kichenok	7^{7}	3	[10]
8	(Slovenia) Andreja Klepač (Spain) María José Martínez Sánchez	6^{5}	6	[12]
(Canada) Gabriela Dabrowski (Latvia) Jeļena Ostapenko	6	6
(Czech Republic) Barbora Krejčíková (Czech Republic) Kateřina Siniaková	3	3

Final
8	(Slovenia) Andreja Klepač (Spain) María José Martínez Sánchez	3	3
(Canada) Gabriela Dabrowski (Latvia) Jeļena Ostapenko	6	6

=== Top half ===
First round
(Japan) S Aoyama (Slovenia) K Srebotnik	3	2
(Russia) A Pavlyuchenkova (Ukraine) O Savchuk	6	6
WC	(Slovakia) D Cibulková (Russia) V Zvonareva	1	4
(Japan) N Hibino (Croatia) D Jurak	6	6
(Australia) M Adamczak (Ukraine) L Kichenok	0	6	[10]
5	(Chinese Taipei) S-w Hsieh (China) S Peng	6	3	[8]
WC	(Qatar) M Al-Naimi (Tunisia) O Jabeur	2	0
(Russia) V Kudermetova (Russia) A Kudryavtseva	6	6
(Romania) M Buzărnescu (France) A Cornet	2	6	[10]
(Poland) A Rosolska (United States) A Spears	6	4	[6]
(United Kingdom) A Smith (Czech Republic) R Voráčová	3	3
8	(Slovenia) A Klepač (Spain) MJ Martínez Sánchez	6	6

Second round
1	(Russia) E Makarova (Russia) E Vesnina	2	7	[10]
(Russia) A Pavlyuchenkova (Ukraine) O Savchuk	6	5	[4]
(Japan) N Hibino (Croatia) D Jurak	2	7^{9}	[6]
(Australia) M Adamczak (Ukraine) L Kichenok	6	6^{7}	[10]
4	(Hungary) T Babos (France) K Mladenovic	6^{1}	6	[10]
(Russia) V Kudermetova (Russia) A Kudryavtseva	7^{7}	4	[8]
(Romania) M Buzărnescu (France) A Cornet	2	7^{7}	[10]
8	(Slovenia) A Klepač (Spain) MJ Martínez Sánchez	6	6^{4}	[12]

Quarterfinals
1	(Russia) E Makarova (Russia) E Vesnina	3	3
(Australia) M Adamczak (Ukraine) L Kichenok	6	6
4	(Hungary) T Babos (France) K Mladenovic	2	6	[6]
8	(Slovenia) A Klepač (Spain) MJ Martínez Sánchez	6	3	[10]

Semifinals
(Australia) M Adamczak (Ukraine) L Kichenok	7^{7}	3	[10]
8	(Slovenia) A Klepač (Spain) MJ Martínez Sánchez	6^{5}	6	[12]

=== Bottom half ===
First round
7	(Chinese Taipei) H-c Chan (China) Z Yang	6	4	[10]
(Georgia (country)) O Kalashnikova (Belarus) L Marozava	1	6	[2]
(Ukraine) K Bondarenko (Serbia) A Krunić	6	1	[10]
(Ukraine) N Kichenok (Australia) An Rodionova	4	6	[8]
(Canada) G Dabrowski (Latvia) J Ostapenko	4	6	[10]
(United States) N Melichar (Czech Republic) K Peschke	6	1	[8]
Alt	(Germany) M Barthel (Germany) C Witthöft	6	2	[2]
(Czech Republic) B Krejčíková (Czech Republic) K Siniaková	2	6	[10]
(United States) R Atawo (Germany) A-L Grönefeld	4	3
(Belgium) E Mertens (Netherlands) D Schuurs	6	6
WC	(Oman) F Al-Nabhani (Indonesia) J Rompies	4	0
(Japan) M Kato (Japan) M Ninomiya	6	6

Second round
7	(Chinese Taipei) H-c Chan (China) Z Yang	6	4	[6]
(Ukraine) K Bondarenko (Serbia) A Krunić	3	6	[10]
(Canada) G Dabrowski (Latvia) J Ostapenko	3
3	(Czech Republic) L Šafářová (Czech Republic) B Strýcová	0^{r}
(Czech Republic) B Krejčíková (Czech Republic) K Siniaková	6	4	[15]
(Belgium) E Mertens (Netherlands) D Schuurs	1	6	[13]
(Japan) M Kato (Japan) M Ninomiya	6	6
2	(Chinese Taipei) L Chan (Czech Republic) A Sestini Hlaváčková	1	3

Quarterfinals
(Ukraine) K Bondarenko (Serbia) A Krunić	3	4
(Canada) G Dabrowski (Latvia) J Ostapenko	6	6
(Czech Republic) B Krejčíková (Czech Republic) K Siniaková	7^{7}	6
(Japan) M Kato (Japan) M Ninomiya	6^{5}	1

Semifinals
(Canada) G Dabrowski (Latvia) J Ostapenko	6	6
(Czech Republic) B Krejčíková (Czech Republic) K Siniaková	3	3
