= One Love Tennis Open =

- 2016 One Love Tennis Open

ITF Women's Tour
- Event name: Atlanta
- Location: Atlanta, United States
- Venue: Lifetime Athletics at Peachtree Corners
- Category: ITF Women's Circuit
- Surface: Hard
- Draw: 32S/32Q/16D
- Prize money: $50,000
- Website: onelovetennis.com

The One Love Tennis Open was a tournament for professional female tennis players played on outdoor hardcourts. The event was classified as a $50,000 ITF Women's Circuit tournament, held in Atlanta, United States, only 2016.

== Past finals ==
=== Singles ===
Year	Champion	Runner-up	Score
2016	(Belgium) Elise Mertens	(United States) Melanie Oudin	6–4, 6–2

=== Doubles ===
Year	Champions	Runners-up	Score
2016	(United States) Ingrid Neel (Brazil) Luisa Stefani	(United States) Alexandra Stevenson (United States) Taylor Townsend	4–6, 6–4, [10–5]
