= 2012 John Newcombe Women's Pro Challenge – Singles =

Singles
- 2012 John Newcombe Women's Pro Challenge

Final
- Champion: (United States) Melanie Oudin
- Runner-up: (Colombia) Mariana Duque
- Score: 6–1, 6–1

Events
Singles	Doubles
- John Newcombe Women's Pro Challenge

This was a new event in 2012. Melanie Oudin won the title, defeating Mariana Duque in the final, 6–1, 6–1.

== Seeds ==
1. (Italy) Camila Giorgi (quarterfinals)
2. (United States) Lauren Davis (first round)
3. (United States) Melanie Oudin (champion)
4. (Croatia) Mirjana Lučić (semifinals)
5. (Portugal) Michelle Larcher de Brito (quarterfinals)
6. (Colombia) Mariana Duque (final)
7. (United States) Madison Keys (semifinals)
8. (United States) Chichi Scholl (second round)

== Main draw ==
Key

- Q = Qualifier
- WC = Wild card
- LL = Lucky loser
- Alt = Alternate
- ITF = ITF entry
- PR = Protected ranking
- SR = Special ranking
- SE = Special exempt
- JE = Junior exempt
- JR = Junior Accelerator Programme entrant
- CO = College Accelerator Programme entrant
- NG = Next Gen Accelerator Program entrant
- w/o = Walkover
- r = Retired
- d = Defaulted

=== Finals ===
Semifinals
7	(United States) Madison Keys	4	3
3	(United States) Melanie Oudin	6	6
4	(Croatia) Mirjana Lučić	5	6^{3}
6	(Colombia) Mariana Duque	7	7^{7}

Final
3	(United States) Melanie Oudin	6	6
6	(Colombia) Mariana Duque	1	1

=== Top half ===
First round
1	(Italy) C Giorgi	6	6
(United States) A Weinhold	0	2
(Ukraine) A Sotnikova	6	6
Q	(United States) L Albanese	1	3
WC	(United States) Y Schnack	6	6
WC	(United States) R Alda	1	2
(Venezuela) A Pérez	0	1
7	(United States) M Keys	6	6
3	(United States) M Oudin	6	6
WC	(United States) V Duval	3	2
LL	(United States) N Pluskota	6	6
(United States) E Ferris	0	1
(United States) A Muhammad	3	4
(Norway) U Eikeri	6	6
Q	(Croatia) J Pandžić	4	4
8	(United States) C Scholl	6	6

Second round
1	(Italy) C Giorgi	6	6
(Ukraine) A Sotnikova	0	1
WC	(United States) Y Schnack	4	3
7	(United States) M Keys	6	6
3	(United States) M Oudin	6	6
LL	(United States) N Pluskota	2	4
(Norway) U Eikeri	6	6
8	(United States) C Scholl	1	1

Quarterfinals
1	(Italy) C Giorgi	6	4	4
7	(United States) M Keys	3	6	6
3	(United States) M Oudin	7^{7}	6
(Norway) U Eikeri	6^{3}	1

Semifinals
7	(United States) M Keys	4	3
3	(United States) M Oudin	6	6

=== Bottom half ===
First round
5	(Portugal) M Larcher de Brito	6	6
(Germany) L Siegemund	4	1
Q	(United States) S Marand	2	3
(Russia) E Bovina	6	6
(Russia) A Gabueva	0	3
LL	(Indonesia) R Tedjakusuma	6	6
(United States) E Lumpkin	1	1
4	(Croatia) M Lučić	6	6
6	(Colombia) M Duque	6	6
(Slovakia) L Wienerová	4	2
Q	(United States) T Townsend	7^{7}	5	7
(United States) N Melichar	6^{3}	7	5
(Germany) N Geuer	2	3
(Croatia) A Tomljanović	6	6
(United States) S Rogers	6	6
2	(United States) L Davis	3	3

Second round
5	(Portugal) M Larcher de Brito	6	3	6
(Russia) E Bovina	2	6	3
LL	(Indonesia) R Tedjakusuma	6	4	1
4	(Croatia) M Lučić	4	6	6
6	(Colombia) M Duque	6	6
Q	(United States) T Townsend	2	3
(Croatia) A Tomljanović	6	6^{3}	6
(United States) S Rogers	2	7^{7}	1

Quarterfinals
5	(Portugal) M Larcher de Brito	2	3
4	(Croatia) M Lučić	6	6
6	(Colombia) M Duque	4	7	7
(Croatia) A Tomljanović	6	5	5

Semifinals
4	(Croatia) M Lučić	5	6^{3}
6	(Colombia) M Duque	7	7^{7}
