= 2012 John Newcombe Women's Pro Challenge – Doubles =

Doubles
- 2012 John Newcombe Women's Pro Challenge

Final
- Champions: (Russia) Elena Bovina (Croatia) Mirjana Lučić
- Runners-up: (Colombia) Mariana Duque (Venezuela) Adriana Pérez
- Score: 6–3, 4–6, [10–8]

Events
Singles	Doubles
- John Newcombe Women's Pro Challenge

This was a new event in 2012. Elena Bovina and Mirjana Lučić won the title, defeating Mariana Duque and Adriana Pérez in the final, 6–3, 4–6, [10–8].

== Seeds ==
1. (Russia) Elena Bovina / (Croatia) Mirjana Lučić (champions)
2. (Colombia) Mariana Duque / (Venezuela) Adriana Pérez (final)
3. (United States) Madison Keys / (United States) Melanie Oudin (first round)
4. (United States) Sanaz Marand / (United States) Ashley Weinhold (quarterfinals)

== Draw ==
Key

- Q = Qualifier
- WC = Wild card
- LL = Lucky loser
- Alt = Alternate
- ITF = ITF entry
- PR = Protected ranking
- SR = Special ranking
- SE = Special exempt
- JE = Junior exempt
- JR = Junior Accelerator Programme entrant
- CO = College Accelerator Programme entrant
- NG = Next Gen Accelerator Program entrant
- w/o = Walkover
- r = Retired
- d = Defaulted

First round
1	(Russia) E Bovina (Croatia) M Lučić	6	6
(United States) E Lumpkin (Ukraine) A Sotnikova	4	4
(United States) A-L Jeukeng (United States) J Lawrence	6	6
(Argentina) M Ferrero (United States) N Robinson	2	2
3	(United States) M Keys (United States) M Oudin	4	6	[9]
(United States) J Cako (United States) N Pluskota	6	3	[11]
(United States) R Alda (Slovenia) J Durišić	2	2
(United States) S Rogers (Croatia) A Tomljanović	6	6
(United States) E Ferris (Indonesia) R Tedjakusuma	2	2
(Norway) U Eikeri (Russia) A Gabueva	6	6
(United States) N Melichar (United States) C Scholl	7^{7}	2	[13]
4	(United States) S Marand (United States) A Weinhold	6^{5}	6	[15]
(Germany) N Geuer (Slovakia) L Wienerová	2	6	[9]
(United States) K Boxx (United States) K Wong	6	4	[11]
(United States) B Brewster (United States) L Fieldsend	1	2
2	(Colombia) M Duque (Venezuela) A Pérez	6	6

Quarterfinals
1	(Russia) E Bovina (Croatia) M Lučić	6	7^{10}
(United States) A-L Jeukeng (United States) J Lawrence	1	6^{8}
(United States) J Cako (United States) N Pluskota	4	3
(United States) S Rogers (Croatia) A Tomljanović	6	6
(Norway) U Eikeri (Russia) A Gabueva	7^{9}	6
4	(United States) S Marand (United States) A Weinhold	6^{7}	2
(United States) K Boxx (United States) K Wong	4	2
2	(Colombia) M Duque (Venezuela) A Pérez	6	6

Semifinals
1	(Russia) E Bovina (Croatia) M Lučić	6	6
(United States) S Rogers (Croatia) A Tomljanović	2	3
(Norway) U Eikeri (Russia) A Gabueva	6	4	[3]
2	(Colombia) M Duque (Venezuela) A Pérez	4	6	[10]

Finals
1	(Russia) E Bovina (Croatia) M Lučić	6	4	[10]
2	(Colombia) M Duque (Venezuela) A Pérez	3	6	[8]
