= 2019 Qatar Total Open – Doubles =

Doubles
- 2019 Qatar Total Open

Final
- Champions: (Chinese Taipei) Chan Hao-ching (Chinese Taipei) Latisha Chan
- Runners-up: (Germany) Anna-Lena Grönefeld (Netherlands) Demi Schuurs
- Score: 6–1, 3–6, [10–6]

Events
Singles	Doubles
← 2018 ·	Qatar Total Open	· 2020 →

Gabriela Dabrowski and Jeļena Ostapenko were the defending champions, but chose not to participate together. Dabrowski played alongside Xu Yifan, but lost in the first round to Lara Arruabarrena and Kaitlyn Christian. Ostapenko teamed up with Veronika Kudermetova, but lost in the semifinals to Chan Hao-ching and Latisha Chan.

The Chan sisters went on to win the title, defeating Anna-Lena Grönefeld and Demi Schuurs in the final, 6–1, 3–6, [10–6].

== Seeds ==
1. (United States) Nicole Melichar / (Czech Republic) Květa Peschke (first round)
2. (Chinese Taipei) Hsieh Su-wei / (Czech Republic) Barbora Strýcová (first round)
3. (Canada) Gabriela Dabrowski / (China) Xu Yifan (first round)
4. (Germany) Anna-Lena Grönefeld / (Netherlands) Demi Schuurs (final)

== Draw ==
=== Key ===
- Q = Qualifier
- WC = Wild card
- LL = Lucky loser
- Alt = Alternate
- SE = Special exempt
- PR = Protected ranking
- ITF = ITF entry
- JE = Junior exempt
- w/o = Walkover
- r = Retired
- d = Defaulted
- SR = Special ranking

=== Draw ===
First round
1	(United States) N Melichar (Czech Republic) K Peschke	6	3	[9]
Alt	(Tunisia) O Jabeur (United States) A Riske	2	6	[11]
(Romania) M Buzărnescu (Poland) A Rosolska	3	6	[10]
(Croatia) D Jurak (Spain) MJ Martínez Sánchez	6	3	[4]
4	(Germany) A-L Grönefeld (Netherlands) D Schuurs	6	6
(Japan) M Kato (Japan) M Ninomiya	4	3
WC	(Oman) F Al-Nabhani (Qatar) M Al-Naimi	2	0
(United States) A Spears (China) Z Yang	6	6
(Chinese Taipei) H-c Chan (Chinese Taipei) L Chan	7^{7}	7
(Japan) S Aoyama (Belarus) L Marozava	6^{2}	5
(Spain) L Arruabarrena (United States) K Christian	6	7
3	(Canada) G Dabrowski (China) Y Xu	3	5
(Ukraine) N Kichenok (Belarus) A Sasnovich	5	6^{6}
(United States) R Atawo (Slovenia) K Srebotnik	7	7^{8}
(Russia) V Kudermetova (Latvia) J Ostapenko	4	6	[10]
2	(Chinese Taipei) S-w Hsieh (Czech Republic) B Strýcová	6	3	[4]

Quarterfinals
Alt	(Tunisia) O Jabeur (United States) A Riske	6	6
(Romania) M Buzărnescu (Poland) A Rosolska	1	2
4	(Germany) A-L Grönefeld (Netherlands) D Schuurs	6	6
(United States) A Spears (China) Z Yang	4	2
(Chinese Taipei) H-c Chan (Chinese Taipei) L Chan	6	6
(Spain) L Arruabarrena (United States) K Christian	3	2
(United States) R Atawo (Slovenia) K Srebotnik	4	2
(Russia) V Kudermetova (Latvia) J Ostapenko	6	6

Semifinals
Alt	(Tunisia) O Jabeur (United States) A Riske	2	5
4	(Germany) A-L Grönefeld (Netherlands) D Schuurs	6	7
(Chinese Taipei) H-c Chan (Chinese Taipei) L Chan	6	7^{7}
(Russia) V Kudermetova (Latvia) J Ostapenko	4	6^{2}

Final
4	(Germany) A-L Grönefeld (Netherlands) D Schuurs	1	6	[6]
(Chinese Taipei) H-c Chan (Chinese Taipei) L Chan	6	3	[10]
