= Alexandra Stevenson =

American tennis player

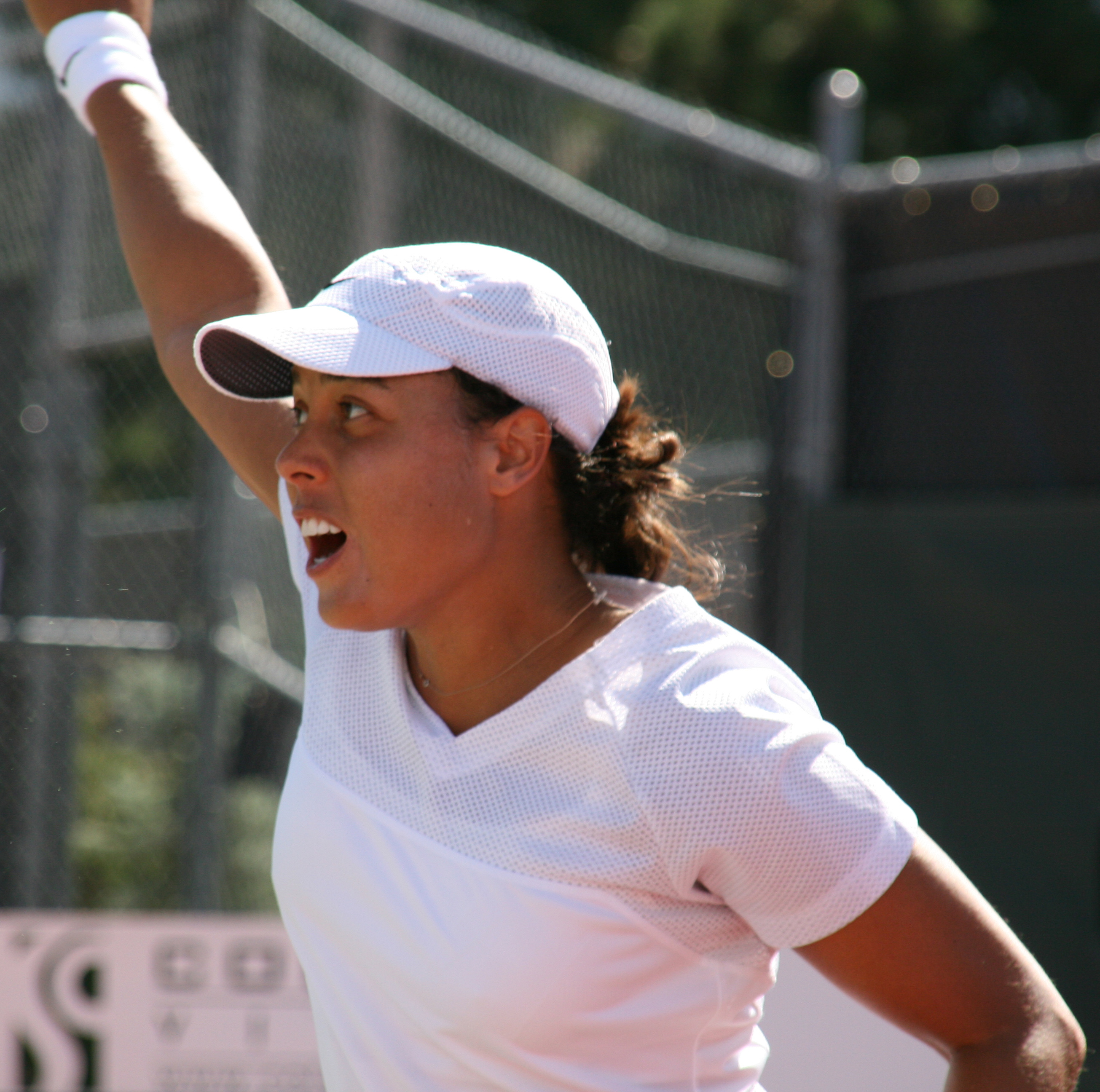
- Country (sports): United States
- Born: December 15, 1980 (age 45) La Jolla, California
- Height: 1.85 m (6 ft 1 in)
- Turned pro: June 1999
- Retired: 2018
- Plays: Right (one-handed backhand)
- Prize money: $1,472,403

Singles
- Career record: 427–448
- Career titles: 0 WTA, 1 ITF
- Highest ranking: No. 18 (October 28, 2002)

Grand Slam singles results
- Australian Open: 2R (2001, 2003)
- French Open: 1R (2000, 2001, 2002, 2003)
- Wimbledon: SF (1999)
- US Open: 1R (1998, 1999, 2000, 2001, 2002, 2003, 2004)

Doubles
- Career record: 40–82
- Career titles: 1 WTA
- Highest ranking: No. 67 (July 7, 2003)

Grand Slam doubles results
- Australian Open: 2R (2001)
- French Open: 1R (2001, 2003)
- Wimbledon: 3R (2003)
- US Open: 2R (1999, 2000, 2002, 2003)

Mixed doubles
- Career record: 8–7
- Career titles: 0

Grand Slam mixed doubles results
- Wimbledon: 2R (2000)
- US Open: SF (1999)

Alexandra Stevenson
Medal record

Pan American Games
Bronze medal – third place	Winnipeg 1999	Women's singles

Alexandra Winfield Stevenson (born December 15, 1980) is an American former professional tennis player. At four years old, Alexandra began learning tennis technique from Angel Lopez at the San Diego Tennis and Racquet Club. Lopez would continue to coach Alexandra through her professional career.

== Early life and education ==
Stevenson's mother is Samantha Stevenson, a sports journalist. Her father is former National Basketball Association player Julius Erving. Erving was married when he met Samantha Stevenson, and Alexandra Stevenson was conceived as a result of an affair. Alexandra Stevenson met her father for the first time October 2008 after she initiated a meeting. The meeting was documented by ESPN.com's "Reaching Out". Stevenson keeps up with her father between tournaments.

Stevenson graduated from the University of Colorado in December 2007, with a Bachelor of Liberal Arts, Sociology. She graduated on the Dean's List and is the only final-eight member to have graduated from college while playing professional tennis. Stevenson was inducted into the La Jolla Country Day School Hall of Fame in December 2009 – joining fellow Torrey, Rashaan Salaam, the 1994 Heisman Trophy winner.

== Career ==
=== Early years ===
Stevenson made her professional tennis debut in 1998 as a wild card at the US Open where she lost in the first round to France's Alexandra Fusai. In 1999 Stevenson qualified and ultimately reached the quarterfinals at Birmingham, a grass warmup to Wimbledon, before withdrawing to Magüi Serna because of a stomach muscle pull. The next week, Stevenson was the number one seed during qualifying at Roehampton—and did not drop a set in three rounds as she moved into the main draw at Wimbledon.

At Wimbledon, two weeks after graduating from La Jolla Country Day School, she became the second woman qualifier in the tennis Open Era to reach the semifinals. It was her second time at Wimbledon, having competed the year before in the Junior Wimbledon Championships. Stevenson beat 11th seed Julie Halard in the third round. In the fourth round, she saved one match point against Lisa Raymond in a 2–6, 7–6, 6–1 win. She then beat Jelena Dokić in three sets in the quarterfinals, before losing to the eventual champion, third seed Lindsay Davenport. Stevenson had 57 aces during the fortnight, her serve speed over 120 mph. It was the beginning of Stevenson being known for the fastest second serve in the women's game. Stevenson's second serve was 105 mph – 115 mph. Phil Knight, the co-founder and chairman of Nike, flew to London to personally sign Stevenson to a three-year contract.

During the months following her dramatic run at Wimbledon, Stevenson was named Rookie of the Year by Tennis Magazine and named Most Fascinating by People Magazine. She was interviewed by Barbara Walters for a Barbara Walters Special and was featured in a variety of national and international media. Nike flew a dozen flags with Stevenson's name in bold print during her first visit to the iconic campus. Stevenson moved from California to train with Nick Bollettieri at IMG Academy from 1999 to 2002. In 2000 and 2001, Stevenson, often pitted against top 20 players – including Nathalie Tauziat, Mary Pierce, Martina Hingis, Monica Seles, Amanda Coetzer, Lisa Raymond, Dominique Van Roost, Julie Halard, Jennifer Capriati, Serena Williams, and Venus Williams – worked on her aggressive all-court playing style as she found her way in the professional game.

Stevenson reached the quarterfinals at Quebec City in 2001, and the quarterfinals at Linz, defeating Arantxa Sánchez Vicario en route.

But, it was in 2002 that Stevenson moved up to No. 18 in the world. She had played during the European indoor season in 2001 and was the only American player to appear in Moscow in 2001 following the September 11 terrorist attacks. In 2002, prior to the European indoors, she lost to Monica Seles in the Tokyo quarterfinals 6–7^{(9)}, 6–7^{(9)}, and there were no breaks of serve until the tiebreakers. Alan Mills, the Tokyo referee and renowned Wimbledon referee proclaimed, "This is the finest women's serving match I have ever seen." Soon after, Seles and Stevenson were asked to serve aces for the American Heart Association, bringing awareness to heart disease. Stevenson served 100 aces in 2003. During the 2002 European indoors, Stevenson won her first doubles title with Serena Williams in Leipzig, Germany. She reached the quarterfinals of Filderstadt, defeating number one Jennifer Capriati. She was a finalist at Linz, beating two top ten players en route, including Capriati. Stevenson finished the year at 18, percentage points away from No. 17, Elena Dementieva.

=== Injury and return ===
Stevenson experienced shoulder pain in 2003 at the Wimbledon Championships. She worked on strengthening the area, but was unable to repair the tear. Stevenson went to Birmingham, Alabama, where Dr. James Andrews performed a type II labral repair on her right shoulder in September 2004. In 2006, following 18 months of shoulder strengthening, Stevenson began to mount a comeback.

Stevenson played in the qualifying round at 2006 Wimbledon, but after defeating Jelena Dokić, a player that she had played in 1999 in the Wimbledon quarterfinals, when they were both qualifiers, she suffered a pectoral strain and fell in the second round of qualifiers. At the 2006 Cincinnati Open, she also had a successful run in the qualifying round, but continued shoulder pain caused her to fall in the final round to Chan Chin-wei, in three sets. By 2009, Stevenson gained shoulder strength and posted strong results. In 2010, Kevin Wilk, Dr. Andrews' physical therapist, said that Stevenson's shoulder "feels like a non-surgical arm."

Stevenson won the Sarasota Clay Court Invitational in April 2012.

=== Playing style ===
Stevenson joined Venus Williams, Serena Williams, Lindsay Davenport, Monica Seles, Mary Pierce and Jennifer Capriati as a premier power player on the WTA Tour in 1999. 6' 1" and right-handed, she plays with a one-handed backhand. Her serve, forehand, and one-handed backhand are noted weapons in Stevenson's all-court game. Her fastest serve was clocked at 125 mph. She had the fastest second serve in the women's game from 1999 to 2004 at 105–115 mph. She was the first woman to amass 57 aces during the Wimbledon fortnight in 1999. The power game came from years of repetitive lessons. At nine years old, Stevenson began traveling from her home in San Diego to Los Angeles to be coached by Robert Lansdorp and Pete Fischer. It was Lansdorp who developed her powerful ground game, changing her two-handed backhand to a one-handed backhand. Lansdorp would tie her arm with an ace bandage to work on the backhand motion. Fischer, who also coached Pete Sampras, developed Stevenson's service motion, often used by coaches to teach "the perfect service motion." Fischer designed service drills to resemble Sampras' fluid serve.

=== Broadcast career ===
Starting in August 2019, Stevenson joined the ESPN tennis commentating team in their coverage of the qualifying and main draws of the 2019 US Open. She also did the commentating at the 2020 and 2021 US Open for ESPN.

== Personal life ==
On September 11, 2001, Stevenson lost one of her friends – Manny Del Valle, a firefighter – in the World Trade Center. She wrote an article in The New York Times about Del Valle, a driver for the players at the US Open. In 2002, the four Grand Slam tournaments allowed Stevenson to wear the patch of Del Valle's Engine Company (Engine No. 5) on her Nike cap.

== WTA Tour finals ==
=== Singles: 2 (2 runner-ups) ===
Legend Tier I Tier II (0–1) Tier III, IV & V (0–1)	Finals by surface Hard (0–2) Clay (0–0) Carpet (0–0)

Result	W–L	Date	Tournament	Tier	Surface	Opponent	Score
Loss	0–1	Feb 2002	National Indoor Championships, United States	Tier III	Hard (i)	(United States) Lisa Raymond	6–4, 3–6, 6–7^{(9–11)}
Loss	0–2	Oct 2002	Linz Open, Austria	Tier II	Hard (i)	(Belgium) Justine Henin	3–6, 0–6

=== Doubles: 1 (title) ===
Legend Tier I Tier II (1–0) Tier III, IV & V	Finals by surface Hard (0–0) Clay (0–0) Carpet (1–0)

Result	W–L	Date	Tournament	Tier	Surface	Partner	Opponents	Score
Win	1–0	Sep 2002	Sparkassen Cup Leipzig, Germany	Tier II	Carpet (i)	(United States) Serena Williams	(Slovakia) Janette Husárová (Argentina) Paola Suárez	6–3, 7–5

== ITF Circuit finals ==
=== Singles: 2 (1 title, 1 runner–up) ===
Legend $50,000 tournaments $25,000 tournaments	Finals by surface Hard (1–1) Clay (0–0)

Result	W–L	Date	Tournament	Tier	Surface	Opponent	Score
Win	1–0	Feb 1998	Midland Tennis Classic, United States	50,000	Hard (i)	(United States) Samantha Reeves	7–6^{(10–8)}, 6–1
Loss	1–1	May 2009	Carson Challenger, United States	50,000	Hard	(Canada) Valérie Tétreault	6–4, 2–6, 4–6

=== Doubles: 2 (2 runner-ups) ===
Legend $50,000 tournaments $25,000 tournaments	Finals by surface Hard (0–1) Clay (0–1)

Result	W–L	Date	Tournament	Tier	Surface	Partner	Opponents	Score
Loss	0–1	May 2015	ITF Indian Harbour Beach, United States	50,000	Clay	(Russia) Angelina Gabueva	(United States) Maria Sanchez (United States) Taylor Townsend	0–6, 1–6
Loss	0–2	Sep 2016	Atlanta Tennis Open, United States	50,000	Hard	(United States) Taylor Townsend	(United States) Ingrid Neel (Brazil) Luisa Stefani	6–4, 4–6, [5–10]

== Singles performance timeline ==
Key
W	F	SF	QF	#R	RR	Q#	P#	DNQ	A	Z#	PO	G	S	B	NMS	NTI	P	NH

(W) winner; (F) finalist; (SF) semifinalist; (QF) quarterfinalist; (#R) rounds 4, 3, 2, 1; (RR) round-robin stage; (Q#) qualification round; (P#) preliminary round; (DNQ) did not qualify; (A) absent; (Z#) Davis/Fed Cup Zonal Group (with number indication) or (PO) play-off; (G) gold, (S) silver or (B) bronze Olympic/Paralympic medal; (NMS) not a Masters tournament; (NTI) not a Tier I tournament; (P) postponed; (NH) not held; (SR) strike rate (events won / competed); (W–L) win–loss record.

Tournament	1996	1997	1998	1999	2000	2001	2002	2003	2004	2005	2006	2007	2008	Career W–L
Grand Slam tournaments
Australian Open	A	A	A	A	1R	2R	1R	2R	1R	A	A	A	A	2–5
French Open	A	A	A	A	1R	1R	1R	1R	A	A	A	A	A	0–4
Wimbledon	A	A	A	SF	2R	2R	1R	1R	A	A	A	A	A	7–5
US Open	A	A	1R	1R	1R	1R	1R	1R	1R	A	A	A	A	0–7
Win–loss	0–0	0–0	0–1	5–2	1–4	2–4	0–4	1–4	0–2	0–0	0–0	0–0	0–0	9–21
Year-end championships
WTA Tour Championships	A	A	A	A	A	A	A	A	A	A	A	A		0 / 0
Olympic Games
Summer Olympics	A	NH	NH	NH	A	NH	NH	NH	A	NH	NH	NH	A	0 / 0
Tier I tournaments
Doha	_	_	_	_	_	_	_	_	_	_	_	_	A	0 / 0
Indian Wells	1R	1R	A	2R	2R	1R	4R	2R	1R	A	1R	A	A	0 / 9
Key Biscayne	A	A	1R	A	1R	2R	4R	2R	1R	A	A	A	A	0 / 6
Charleston	A	A	A	1R	1R	2R	A	1R	1R	3R	A	A	2R	0 / 7
Berlin	A	A	A	A	2R	A	A	A	A	A	A	A	A	0 / 1
Rome	A	A	A	A	1R	A	A	1R	A	A	A	A	A	0 / 2
Montreal/Toronto	A	A	A	1R	1R	A	3R	A	A	A	A	A		0 / 3
Tokyo	A	A	A	A	2R	A	QF	1R	A	A	A	A		0 / 3
Moscow	_	A	A	A	A	2R	A	2R	A	A	A	A		0 / 2
San Diego	_	_	_	_	_	_	_	_	A	A	A	A		0 / 0
Zurich	A	A	A	A	A	1R	QF	2R	A	A	A	A		0 / 3
Career statistics
Titles/Finals	0–0	0–0	0–0	0–0	0–0	0–0	0–1	0–0	0–0	0–0	0–0	0–0	0–0	0–1
Overall win–loss														213–219^{1}
Year-end ranking	355	394	126	46	93	60	18	82	282	645	394	399		

_ = tournament was either not held or not a Tier I event

^{1} If Fed Cup (0–1 overall) participation is included, her record stands at 213–220 overall
