= John Newcombe Women's Pro Challenge =

ITF Women's Tour
- Event name: New Braunfels
- Location: New Braunfels, Texas, United States
- Venue: John Newcombe Country Club
- Category: ITF Women's Circuit
- Surface: Hard
- Draw: 32S/32Q/16D
- Prize money: $50,000

The John Newcombe Women's Pro Challenge was a tournament for professional female tennis players played on outdoor hard courts. The event was classified as a $50,000 ITF Women's Circuit tournament and was held in New Braunfels, Texas, United States, from 2012 to 2014.

== Past finals ==
=== Singles ===
Year	Champion	Runner-up	Score
2014	(United States) Irina Falconi	(United States) Jennifer Brady	7–6^{(7–3)}, 6–2
2013	(Georgia (country)) Anna Tatishvili	(Bulgaria) Elitsa Kostova	6–4, 6–4
2012	(United States) Melanie Oudin	(Colombia) Mariana Duque	6–1, 6–1

=== Doubles ===
Year	Champions	Runners-up	Score
2014	(Paraguay) Verónica Cepede Royg (Colombia) Mariana Duque	(United States) Alexa Glatch (United States) Bernarda Pera	6–0, 6–3
2013	(Georgia (country)) Anna Tatishvili (United States) Coco Vandeweghe	(United States) Asia Muhammad (United States) Taylor Townsend	3–6, 6–3, [13–11]
2012	(Russia) Elena Bovina (Croatia) Mirjana Lučić-Baroni	(Colombia) Mariana Duque (Venezuela) Adriana Pérez	6–3, 4–6, [10–8]
