= Julia Elbaba =

American tennis player and sports journalist

- Country (sports): United States
- Residence: Oyster Bay, United States
- Born: June 13, 1994 (age 31) Mineola, United States
- Height: 1.65 m (5 ft 5 in)
- Turned pro: 2016
- Plays: Right-handed (two-handed backhand)
- Prize money: $48,010

Singles
- Career record: 87–91
- Career titles: 1 ITF
- Highest ranking: No. 372 (August 14, 2017)

Doubles
- Career record: 41–59
- Career titles: 0
- Highest ranking: No. 301 (November 19, 2018)

Julia Elbaba (born June 13, 1994) is an American former tennis player.

Elbaba has career-high WTA rankings of 372 in singles and 301 in doubles. She made her WTA Tour main-draw debut at the 2019 Dubai Tennis Championships in the doubles draw partnering Alena Fomina.

Elbaba has one ITF singles title, won in 2012 in New Orleans.

Elbaba is currently a journalist at NBC with a focus on tennis. She also covers the NBA, MLB, NFL, soccer and the Olympics. She started her media career at Newsday, covering New York professional sports and Long Island high school sports.
