= 2020 WTA Tour =

Women's tennis circuit

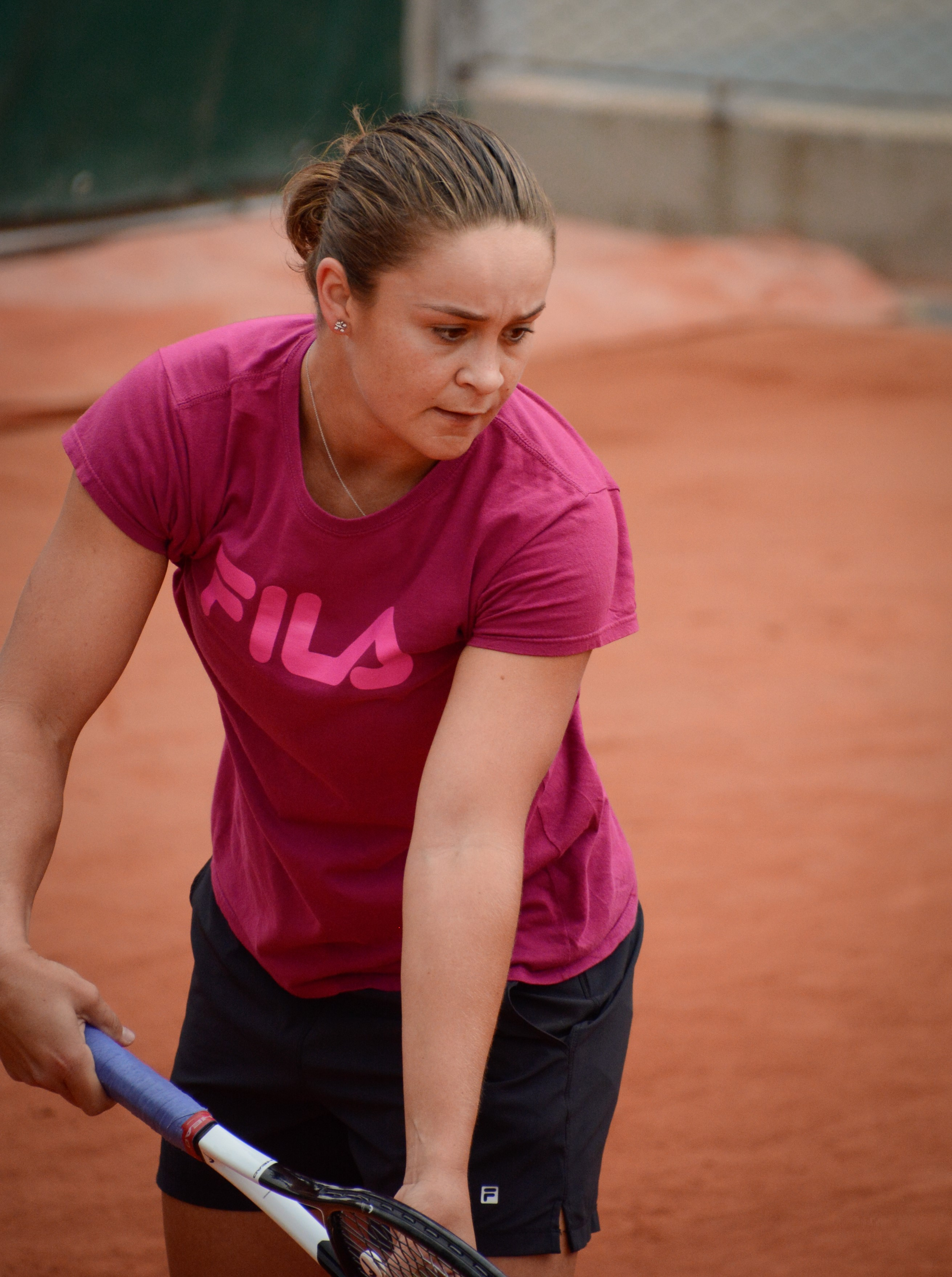
- Ashleigh Barty finished the year as WTA world No. 1 for the second time in her career, though Sofia Kenin was named the Player of the Year. Barty won one tournament during the season. Kenin won two tournaments during the season, including a major at the Australian Open, and finished runner-up at another major, the French Open.

Details
- Duration: 5 January – 15 November 2020
- Edition: 50th
- Tournaments: 24
- Categories: Grand Slam (3); WTA Premier 5 (3); WTA Premier (5); WTA International (13)

Achievements (singles)
- Most titles: (Romania) Simona Halep (Belarus) Aryna Sabalenka (3)
- Most finals: (Kazakhstan) Elena Rybakina (5)
- Prize money leader: (United States) Sofia Kenin ($4,302,970)
- Points leader: (United States) Sofia Kenin (3,934)

Awards
- Player of the year: (United States) Sofia Kenin
- Doubles team of the year: (Hungary) Tímea Babos (France) Kristina Mladenovic
- Most improved player of the year: (Poland) Iga Świątek
- Newcomer of the year: (Argentina) Nadia Podoroska
- Comeback player of the year: (Belarus) Victoria Azarenka

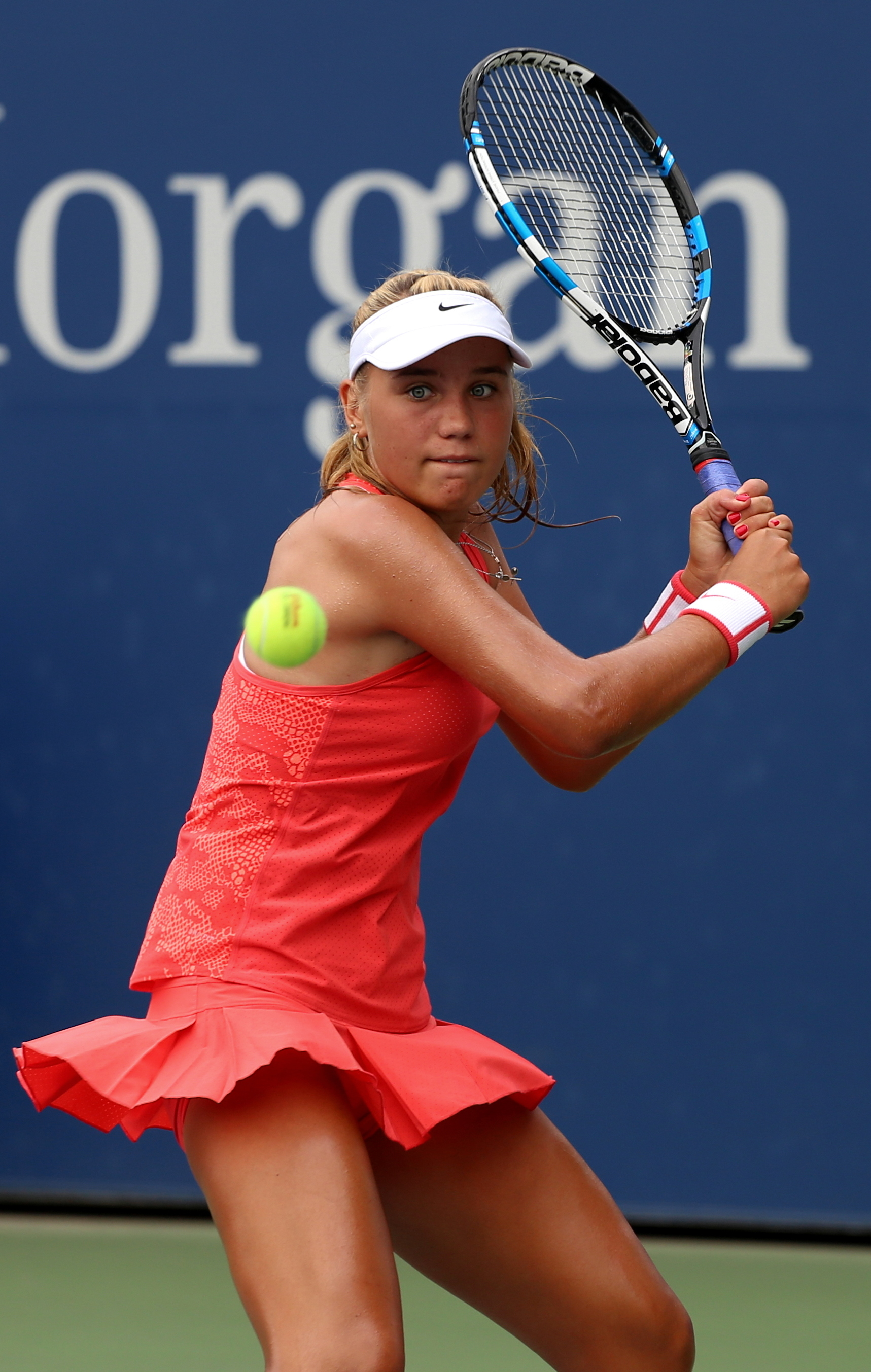
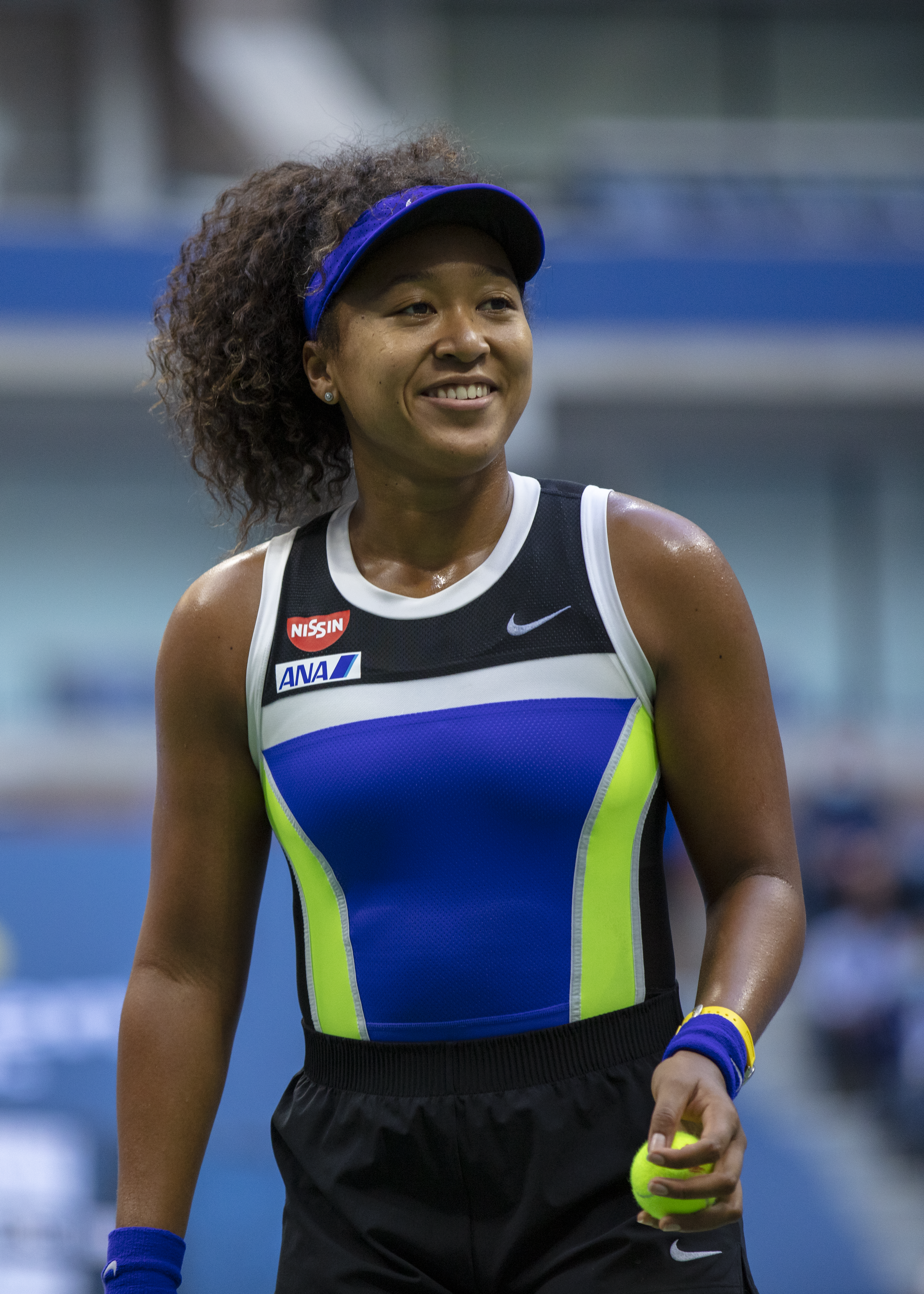
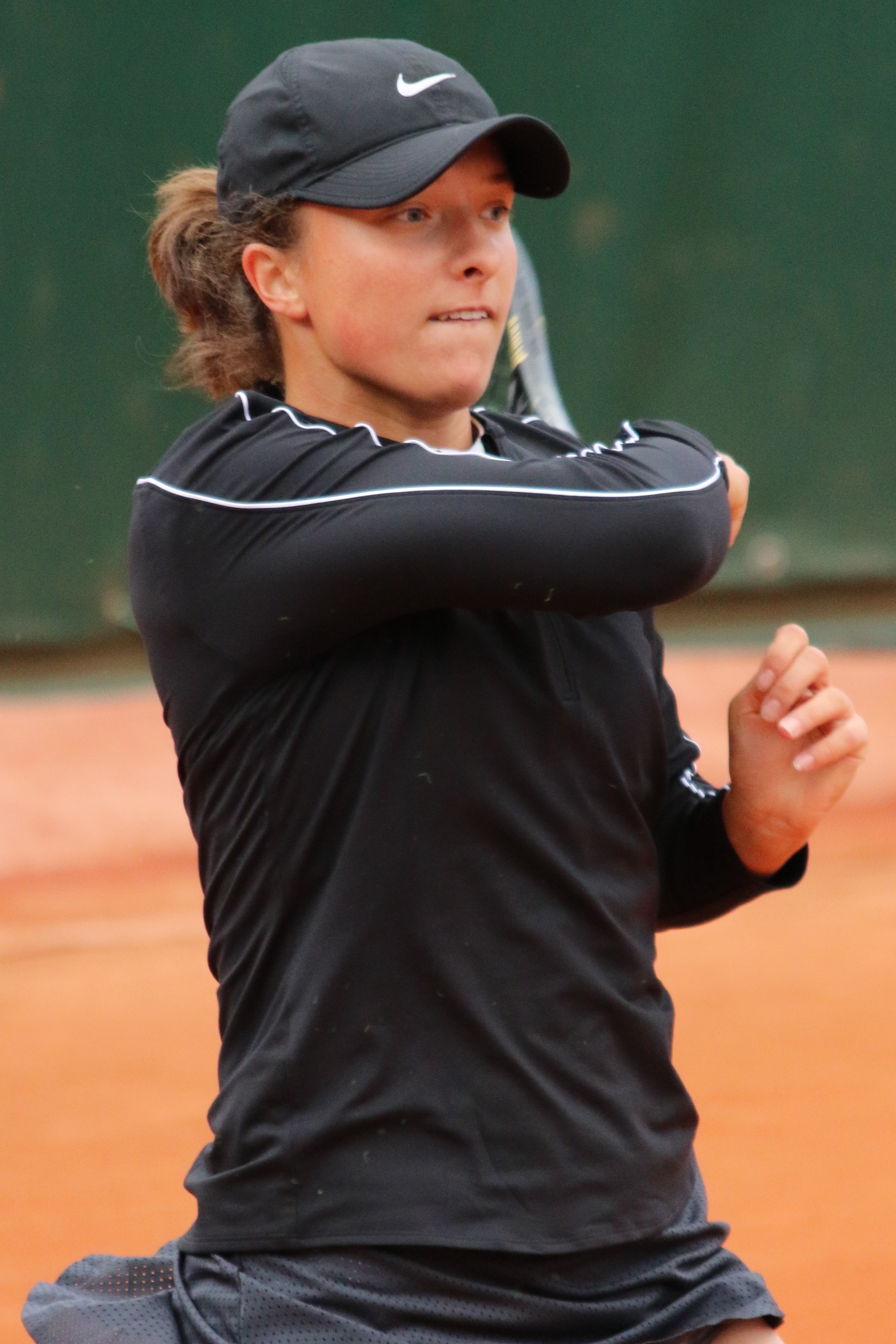
Sofia Kenin won her first Grand Slam title at the Australian Open by defeating Garbiñe Muguruza in the final. Season suspended for five months due to the COVID-19 pandemic including the cancellation of Wimbledon. The season resumed in Palermo in August due to calendar changes in the season where Naomi Osaka won her third Grand Slam title, her second at the US Open, defeating Victoria Azarenka in the final. Iga Świątek won her first Grand Slam title at the French Open defeating Kenin in the final. Świątek was the first Polish player and first player born in the 21st century, male or female, to win a Grand Slam singles title.

The 2020 WTA Tour was the elite professional tennis circuit organised by the Women's Tennis Association (WTA) for the 2020 tennis season. The 2020 WTA Tour calendar originally comprised the Grand Slam tournaments supervised by the International Tennis Federation (ITF), the WTA Premier tournaments (Premier Mandatory, Premier 5, and regular Premier), the WTA International tournaments, the Fed Cup (organized by the ITF), and the year-end championships (the WTA Tour Championships and the WTA Elite Trophy).

Many tournaments were cancelled or postponed due to the COVID-19 pandemic, including the Tokyo Summer Olympics and the Wimbledon Championships.

== Schedule ==
This is the complete schedule of events on the 2020 calendar, with player progression documented from the quarterfinals stage.

Key

Grand Slam tournaments
Year-end championships
WTA Premier Mandatory
WTA Premier 5
WTA Premier
WTA International
Team events

=== January ===
Week	Tournament	Champions	Runners-up	Semifinalists	Quarterfinalists
6 Jan	Brisbane International; Brisbane, Australia; WTA Premier; Hard – $1,500,000 – 30S/16D; Singles – Doubles	(Czech Republic) Karolína Plíšková; 6–4, 4–6, 7–5	(United States) Madison Keys	(Czech Republic) Petra Kvitová (Japan) Naomi Osaka	(United States) Jennifer Brady (United States) Danielle Collins (Netherlands) Kiki Bertens (United States) Alison Riske
6 Jan	Brisbane International; Brisbane, Australia; WTA Premier; Hard – $1,500,000 – 30S/16D; Singles – Doubles	(Chinese Taipei) Hsieh Su-wei (Czech Republic) Barbora Strýcová; 3–6, 7–6^{(9–7)}, [10–8]	(Australia) Ashleigh Barty (Netherlands) Kiki Bertens	(Czech Republic) Petra Kvitová (Japan) Naomi Osaka	(United States) Jennifer Brady (United States) Danielle Collins (Netherlands) Kiki Bertens (United States) Alison Riske
6 Jan	Shenzhen Open; Shenzhen, China; WTA International; Hard – $775,000 – 32S/16D; Singles – Doubles	(Russia) Ekaterina Alexandrova; 6–2, 6–4	(Kazakhstan) Elena Rybakina	(Spain) Garbiñe Muguruza (Czech Republic) Kristýna Plíšková	(Kazakhstan) Zarina Diyas (China) Wang Qiang (Belgium) Elise Mertens (Ukraine) Kateryna Bondarenko
6 Jan	Shenzhen Open; Shenzhen, China; WTA International; Hard – $775,000 – 32S/16D; Singles – Doubles	(Czech Republic) Barbora Krejčíková (Czech Republic) Kateřina Siniaková; 6–2, 3–6, [10–4]	(China) Duan Yingying (China) Zheng Saisai	(Spain) Garbiñe Muguruza (Czech Republic) Kristýna Plíšková	(Kazakhstan) Zarina Diyas (China) Wang Qiang (Belgium) Elise Mertens (Ukraine) Kateryna Bondarenko
6 Jan	Auckland Open; Auckland, New Zealand; WTA International; Hard – $275,000 – 32S/16D; Singles – Doubles	(United States) Serena Williams; 6–3, 6–4	(United States) Jessica Pegula	(United States) Amanda Anisimova (Denmark) Caroline Wozniacki	(Germany) Laura Siegemund (Canada) Eugenie Bouchard (Germany) Julia Görges (France) Alizé Cornet
6 Jan	Auckland Open; Auckland, New Zealand; WTA International; Hard – $275,000 – 32S/16D; Singles – Doubles	(United States) Asia Muhammad (United States) Taylor Townsend; 6–4, 6–4	(United States) Serena Williams (Denmark) Caroline Wozniacki	(United States) Amanda Anisimova (Denmark) Caroline Wozniacki	(Germany) Laura Siegemund (Canada) Eugenie Bouchard (Germany) Julia Görges (France) Alizé Cornet
13 Jan	Adelaide International; Adelaide, Australia; WTA Premier; Hard – $848,000 – 30S/16D; Singles – Doubles	(Australia) Ashleigh Barty; 6–2, 7–5	(Ukraine) Dayana Yastremska	(United States) Danielle Collins (Belarus) Aryna Sabalenka	(Czech Republic) Markéta Vondroušová (Switzerland) Belinda Bencic (Croatia) Donna Vekić (Romania) Simona Halep
13 Jan	Adelaide International; Adelaide, Australia; WTA Premier; Hard – $848,000 – 30S/16D; Singles – Doubles	(United States) Nicole Melichar (China) Xu Yifan; 2–6, 7–5, [10–5]	(Canada) Gabriela Dabrowski (Croatia) Darija Jurak	(United States) Danielle Collins (Belarus) Aryna Sabalenka	(Czech Republic) Markéta Vondroušová (Switzerland) Belinda Bencic (Croatia) Donna Vekić (Romania) Simona Halep
13 Jan	Hobart International; Hobart, Australia; WTA International; Hard – $275,000 – 32S/16D; Singles – Doubles	(Kazakhstan) Elena Rybakina; 7–6^{(9–7)}, 6–3	(China) Zhang Shuai	(United Kingdom) Heather Watson (Russia) Veronika Kudermetova	(Belgium) Elise Mertens (Australia) Lizette Cabrera (United States) Lauren Davis (Spain) Garbiñe Muguruza
13 Jan	Hobart International; Hobart, Australia; WTA International; Hard – $275,000 – 32S/16D; Singles – Doubles	(Ukraine) Nadiia Kichenok (India) Sania Mirza; 6–4, 6–4	(China) Peng Shuai (China) Zhang Shuai	(United Kingdom) Heather Watson (Russia) Veronika Kudermetova	(Belgium) Elise Mertens (Australia) Lizette Cabrera (United States) Lauren Davis (Spain) Garbiñe Muguruza
20 Jan; 27 Jan	Australian Open; Melbourne, Australia; Grand Slam; Hard – A$32,846,000; 128S/64D/32X; Singles – Doubles – Mixed doubles	(United States) Sofia Kenin; 4–6, 6–2, 6–2	(Spain) Garbiñe Muguruza	(Australia) Ashleigh Barty (Romania) Simona Halep	(Czech Republic) Petra Kvitová (Tunisia) Ons Jabeur (Estonia) Anett Kontaveit (Russia) Anastasia Pavlyuchenkova
20 Jan; 27 Jan	Australian Open; Melbourne, Australia; Grand Slam; Hard – A$32,846,000; 128S/64D/32X; Singles – Doubles – Mixed doubles	(Hungary) Tímea Babos (France) Kristina Mladenovic; 6–2, 6–1	(Chinese Taipei) Hsieh Su-wei (Czech Republic) Barbora Strýcová	(Australia) Ashleigh Barty (Romania) Simona Halep	(Czech Republic) Petra Kvitová (Tunisia) Ons Jabeur (Estonia) Anett Kontaveit (Russia) Anastasia Pavlyuchenkova
20 Jan; 27 Jan	Australian Open; Melbourne, Australia; Grand Slam; Hard – A$32,846,000; 128S/64D/32X; Singles – Doubles – Mixed doubles	(Czech Republic) Barbora Krejčíková (Croatia) Nikola Mektić; 5–7, 6–4, [10–1]	(United States) Bethanie Mattek-Sands (United Kingdom) Jamie Murray	(Australia) Ashleigh Barty (Romania) Simona Halep	(Czech Republic) Petra Kvitová (Tunisia) Ons Jabeur (Estonia) Anett Kontaveit (Russia) Anastasia Pavlyuchenkova

=== February ===
Week	Tournament	Champions	Runners-up	Semifinalists	Quarterfinalists
3 Feb	Fed Cup qualifying round Everett, United States – hard (i); The Hague, Netherlands – Clay (i); Cluj-Napoca, Romania – hard (i); Florianópolis, Brazil – Clay; Cartagena, Spain – Clay; Biel/Bienne, Switzerland – hard (i); Kortrijk, Belgium – hard (i); Bratislava, Slovakia – Clay (i)	Qualifying round winners: United States 3–2; Belarus 3–2; Russia 3–2; Germany 4–0; Spain 3–1; Switzerland 3–1; Belgium 3–1; Slovakia 3–1	Qualifying round losers: Latvia; Netherlands; Romania; Brazil; Japan; Canada; Kazakhstan; Great Britain		
10 Feb	St. Petersburg Ladies Trophy; Saint Petersburg, Russia; WTA Premier; Hard (i) – $848,000 – 28S/24Q/16D; Singles – Doubles	(Netherlands) Kiki Bertens; 6–1, 6–3	(Kazakhstan) Elena Rybakina	(Greece) Maria Sakkari (Russia) Ekaterina Alexandrova	(Switzerland) Belinda Bencic (France) Océane Dodin (Czech Republic) Petra Kvitová (Russia) Anastasia Potapova
10 Feb	St. Petersburg Ladies Trophy; Saint Petersburg, Russia; WTA Premier; Hard (i) – $848,000 – 28S/24Q/16D; Singles – Doubles	(Japan) Shuko Aoyama (Japan) Ena Shibahara; 4–6, 6–0, [10–3]	(United States) Kaitlyn Christian (Chile) Alexa Guarachi	(Greece) Maria Sakkari (Russia) Ekaterina Alexandrova	(Switzerland) Belinda Bencic (France) Océane Dodin (Czech Republic) Petra Kvitová (Russia) Anastasia Potapova
10 Feb	Thailand Open; Hua Hin, Thailand; WTA International; Hard – $275,000 – 32S/16D; Singles – Doubles	(Poland) Magda Linette; 6–3, 6–2	(Switzerland) Leonie Küng	(Japan) Nao Hibino (Romania) Patricia Maria Țig	(Ukraine) Elina Svitolina (China) Wang Qiang (China) Zheng Saisai (China) Wang Xiyu
10 Feb	Thailand Open; Hua Hin, Thailand; WTA International; Hard – $275,000 – 32S/16D; Singles – Doubles	(Australia) Arina Rodionova (Australia) Storm Sanders; 6–3, 6–3	(Austria) Barbara Haas (Australia) Ellen Perez	(Japan) Nao Hibino (Romania) Patricia Maria Țig	(Ukraine) Elina Svitolina (China) Wang Qiang (China) Zheng Saisai (China) Wang Xiyu
17 Feb	Dubai Tennis Championships; Dubai, United Arab Emirates; WTA Premier; Hard – $2,908,770 – 30S/28D; Singles – Doubles	(Romania) Simona Halep; 3–6, 6–3, 7–6^{(7–5)}	(Kazakhstan) Elena Rybakina	(United States) Jennifer Brady (Croatia) Petra Martić	(Belarus) Aryna Sabalenka (Spain) Garbiñe Muguruza (Estonia) Anett Kontaveit (Czech Republic) Karolína Plíšková
17 Feb	Dubai Tennis Championships; Dubai, United Arab Emirates; WTA Premier; Hard – $2,908,770 – 30S/28D; Singles – Doubles	(Chinese Taipei) Hsieh Su-wei (Czech Republic) Barbora Strýcová; 7–5, 3–6, [10–5]	(Czech Republic) Barbora Krejčíková (China) Zheng Saisai	(United States) Jennifer Brady (Croatia) Petra Martić	(Belarus) Aryna Sabalenka (Spain) Garbiñe Muguruza (Estonia) Anett Kontaveit (Czech Republic) Karolína Plíšková
24 Feb	Qatar Open; Doha, Qatar; WTA Premier 5 Hard – $3,240,445 – 56S/28D; Singles – Doubles	(Belarus) Aryna Sabalenka; 6–3, 6–3	(Czech Republic) Petra Kvitová	(Australia) Ashleigh Barty (Russia) Svetlana Kuznetsova	(Spain) Garbiñe Muguruza (Tunisia) Ons Jabeur (Switzerland) Belinda Bencic (China) Zheng Saisai
24 Feb	Qatar Open; Doha, Qatar; WTA Premier 5 Hard – $3,240,445 – 56S/28D; Singles – Doubles	(Chinese Taipei) Hsieh Su-wei (Czech Republic) Barbora Strýcová; 6–2, 5–7, [10–2]	(Canada) Gabriela Dabrowski (Latvia) Jeļena Ostapenko	(Australia) Ashleigh Barty (Russia) Svetlana Kuznetsova	(Spain) Garbiñe Muguruza (Tunisia) Ons Jabeur (Switzerland) Belinda Bencic (China) Zheng Saisai
24 Feb	Mexican Open; Acapulco, Mexico; WTA International; Hard – $275,000 – 32S/16D; Singles – Doubles	(United Kingdom) Heather Watson; 6–4, 6–7^{(8–10)}, 6–1	(Canada) Leylah Annie Fernandez	(Mexico) Renata Zarazúa (China) Wang Xiyu	(Slovenia) Tamara Zidanšek (Russia) Anastasia Potapova (United States) Christina McHale (China) Zhu Lin
24 Feb	Mexican Open; Acapulco, Mexico; WTA International; Hard – $275,000 – 32S/16D; Singles – Doubles	(United States) Desirae Krawczyk (Mexico) Giuliana Olmos; 6–3, 7–6^{(7–5)}	(Ukraine) Kateryna Bondarenko (Canada) Sharon Fichman	(Mexico) Renata Zarazúa (China) Wang Xiyu	(Slovenia) Tamara Zidanšek (Russia) Anastasia Potapova (United States) Christina McHale (China) Zhu Lin

=== March ===
Week	Tournament	Champions	Runners-up	Semifinalists	Quarterfinalists
2 Mar	Lyon Open; Lyon, France; WTA International; Hard (i) – $275,000 – 32S/16D; Singles – Doubles	(United States) Sofia Kenin; 6–2, 4–6, 6–4	(Germany) Anna-Lena Friedsam	(Belgium) Alison Van Uytvanck (Russia) Daria Kasatkina	(France) Océane Dodin (France) Caroline Garcia (Italy) Camila Giorgi (Slovakia) Viktória Kužmová
2 Mar	Lyon Open; Lyon, France; WTA International; Hard (i) – $275,000 – 32S/16D; Singles – Doubles	(Romania) Laura Ioana Paar (Germany) Julia Wachaczyk; 7–5, 6–4	(Netherlands) Lesley Pattinama Kerkhove (Netherlands) Bibiane Schoofs	(Belgium) Alison Van Uytvanck (Russia) Daria Kasatkina	(France) Océane Dodin (France) Caroline Garcia (Italy) Camila Giorgi (Slovakia) Viktória Kužmová
2 Mar	Monterrey Open; Monterrey, Mexico; WTA International; Hard – $275,000 – 32S/16D; Singles – Doubles	(Ukraine) Elina Svitolina; 7–5, 4–6, 6–4	(Czech Republic) Marie Bouzková	(Netherlands) Arantxa Rus (United Kingdom) Johanna Konta	(Canada) Leylah Annie Fernandez (Sweden) Rebecca Peterson (China) Wang Yafan (Russia) Anastasia Potapova
2 Mar	Monterrey Open; Monterrey, Mexico; WTA International; Hard – $275,000 – 32S/16D; Singles – Doubles	(Ukraine) Kateryna Bondarenko (Canada) Sharon Fichman; 4–6, 6–3, [10–7]	(Japan) Miyu Kato (China) Wang Yafan	(Netherlands) Arantxa Rus (United Kingdom) Johanna Konta	(Canada) Leylah Annie Fernandez (Sweden) Rebecca Peterson (China) Wang Yafan (Russia) Anastasia Potapova
Rest of March					

=== April – July ===
No tournaments were played due to the COVID-19 pandemic, see affected tournaments below.

=== August ===
Week	Tournament	Champions	Runners-up	Semifinalists	Quarterfinalists
3 Aug	Palermo Open; Palermo, Italy; WTA International; Clay (red) – €163,103 – 32S/16D; Singles – Doubles	(France) Fiona Ferro; 6–2, 7–5	(Estonia) Anett Kontaveit	(Croatia) Petra Martić (Italy) Camila Giorgi	(Belarus) Aliaksandra Sasnovich (Italy) Elisabetta Cocciaretto (Italy) Sara Errani (Ukraine) Dayana Yastremska
3 Aug	Palermo Open; Palermo, Italy; WTA International; Clay (red) – €163,103 – 32S/16D; Singles – Doubles	(Netherlands) Arantxa Rus (Slovenia) Tamara Zidanšek; 7–5, 7–5	(Italy) Elisabetta Cocciaretto (Italy) Martina Trevisan	(Croatia) Petra Martić (Italy) Camila Giorgi	(Belarus) Aliaksandra Sasnovich (Italy) Elisabetta Cocciaretto (Italy) Sara Errani (Ukraine) Dayana Yastremska
10 Aug	Prague Open; Prague, Czech Republic; WTA International; Clay (red) – $225,500 – 32S/16D; Singles – Doubles	(Romania) Simona Halep; 6–2, 7–5	(Belgium) Elise Mertens	(Romania) Irina-Camelia Begu (Czech Republic) Kristýna Plíšková	(Poland) Magdalena Fręch (Spain) Sara Sorribes Tormo (Canada) Eugenie Bouchard (Romania) Ana Bogdan
10 Aug	Prague Open; Prague, Czech Republic; WTA International; Clay (red) – $225,500 – 32S/16D; Singles – Doubles	(Czech Republic) Lucie Hradecká (Czech Republic) Kristýna Plíšková; 6–2, 6–2	(Romania) Monica Niculescu (Romania) Raluca Olaru	(Romania) Irina-Camelia Begu (Czech Republic) Kristýna Plíšková	(Poland) Magdalena Fręch (Spain) Sara Sorribes Tormo (Canada) Eugenie Bouchard (Romania) Ana Bogdan
10 Aug	Top Seed Open; Lexington, United States; WTA International; Hard – $225,500 – 32S/16D; Singles – Doubles	(United States) Jennifer Brady; 6–3, 6–4	(Switzerland) Jil Teichmann	(United States) Shelby Rogers (United States) Coco Gauff	(United States) Serena Williams (United States) Catherine Bellis (Czech Republic) Marie Bouzková (Tunisia) Ons Jabeur
10 Aug	Top Seed Open; Lexington, United States; WTA International; Hard – $225,500 – 32S/16D; Singles – Doubles	(United States) Hayley Carter (Brazil) Luisa Stefani; 6–1, 7–5	(Czech Republic) Marie Bouzková (Switzerland) Jil Teichmann	(United States) Shelby Rogers (United States) Coco Gauff	(United States) Serena Williams (United States) Catherine Bellis (Czech Republic) Marie Bouzková (Tunisia) Ons Jabeur
17 Aug	No tournaments scheduled				
24 Aug	Cincinnati Open; New York City, United States; WTA Premier 5 Hard – $2,250,829 – 56S/32D; Singles – Doubles	(Belarus) Victoria Azarenka; Walkover	(Japan) Naomi Osaka	(Belgium) Elise Mertens (United Kingdom) Johanna Konta	(United States) Jessica Pegula (Estonia) Anett Kontaveit (Greece) Maria Sakkari (Tunisia) Ons Jabeur
24 Aug	Cincinnati Open; New York City, United States; WTA Premier 5 Hard – $2,250,829 – 56S/32D; Singles – Doubles	(Czech Republic) Květa Peschke (Netherlands) Demi Schuurs; 6–1, 4–6, [10–4]	(United States) Nicole Melichar (China) Xu Yifan	(Belgium) Elise Mertens (United Kingdom) Johanna Konta	(United States) Jessica Pegula (Estonia) Anett Kontaveit (Greece) Maria Sakkari (Tunisia) Ons Jabeur
31 Aug; 7 Sep	US Open; New York City, United States; Grand Slam; Hard – $21,656,000; 128S/32D; Singles – Doubles – Mixed doubles (Note: Cancelled)	(Japan) Naomi Osaka; 1–6, 6–3, 6–3	(Belarus) Victoria Azarenka	(United States) Jennifer Brady (United States) Serena Williams	(Kazakhstan) Yulia Putintseva (United States) Shelby Rogers (Bulgaria) Tsvetana Pironkova (Belgium) Elise Mertens
31 Aug; 7 Sep	US Open; New York City, United States; Grand Slam; Hard – $21,656,000; 128S/32D; Singles – Doubles – Mixed doubles	(Germany) Laura Siegemund (Russia) Vera Zvonareva; 6–4, 6–4	(United States) Nicole Melichar (China) Xu Yifan	(United States) Jennifer Brady (United States) Serena Williams	(Kazakhstan) Yulia Putintseva (United States) Shelby Rogers (Bulgaria) Tsvetana Pironkova (Belgium) Elise Mertens

=== September ===
Week	Tournament	Champions	Runners-up	Semifinalists	Quarterfinalists
7 Sep	İstanbul Open; Istanbul, Turkey; WTA International; Clay (red) – $225,500 – 30S/16D; Singles – Doubles	(Romania) Patricia Maria Țig; 2–6, 6–1, 7–6^{(7–4)}	(Canada) Eugenie Bouchard	(Spain) Paula Badosa (Czech Republic) Tereza Martincová	(Montenegro) Danka Kovinić (Slovenia) Polona Hercog (Belarus) Aliaksandra Sasnovich (Sweden) Rebecca Peterson
7 Sep	İstanbul Open; Istanbul, Turkey; WTA International; Clay (red) – $225,500 – 30S/16D; Singles – Doubles	(Chile) Alexa Guarachi (United States) Desirae Krawczyk; 6–1, 6–3	(Australia) Ellen Perez (Australia) Storm Sanders	(Spain) Paula Badosa (Czech Republic) Tereza Martincová	(Montenegro) Danka Kovinić (Slovenia) Polona Hercog (Belarus) Aliaksandra Sasnovich (Sweden) Rebecca Peterson
14 Sep	Italian Open; Rome, Italy; WTA Premier 5 Clay (red) – €1,692,169 – 56S/28D; Singles – Doubles	(Romania) Simona Halep; 6–0, 2–1, ret.	(Czech Republic) Karolína Plíšková	(Spain) Garbiñe Muguruza (Czech Republic) Markéta Vondroušová	(Kazakhstan) Yulia Putintseva (Belarus) Victoria Azarenka (Ukraine) Elina Svitolina (Belgium) Elise Mertens
14 Sep	Italian Open; Rome, Italy; WTA Premier 5 Clay (red) – €1,692,169 – 56S/28D; Singles – Doubles	(Chinese Taipei) Hsieh Su-wei (Czech Republic) Barbora Strýcová; 6–2, 6–2	(Germany) Anna-Lena Friedsam (Romania) Raluca Olaru	(Spain) Garbiñe Muguruza (Czech Republic) Markéta Vondroušová	(Kazakhstan) Yulia Putintseva (Belarus) Victoria Azarenka (Ukraine) Elina Svitolina (Belgium) Elise Mertens
21 Sep	Internationaux de Strasbourg; Strasbourg, France; WTA International; Clay (red) – $225,500 – 30S/16D; Singles – Doubles	(Ukraine) Elina Svitolina; 6–4, 1–6, 6–2	(Kazakhstan) Elena Rybakina	(Japan) Nao Hibino (Belarus) Aryna Sabalenka	(Latvia) Jeļena Ostapenko (China) Zhang Shuai (Czech Republic) Kateřina Siniaková (Switzerland) Jil Teichmann
21 Sep	Internationaux de Strasbourg; Strasbourg, France; WTA International; Clay (red) – $225,500 – 30S/16D; Singles – Doubles	(United States) Nicole Melichar (Netherlands) Demi Schuurs; 6–4, 6–3	(United States) Hayley Carter (Brazil) Luisa Stefani	(Japan) Nao Hibino (Belarus) Aryna Sabalenka	(Latvia) Jeļena Ostapenko (China) Zhang Shuai (Czech Republic) Kateřina Siniaková (Switzerland) Jil Teichmann
28 Sep; 5 Oct	French Open; Paris, France; Grand Slam; Clay (red) – € 128S/96Q/64D; Singles – Doubles − Mixed doubles (Note: Cancelled)	(Poland) Iga Świątek; 6–4, 6–1	(United States) Sofia Kenin	(Argentina) Nadia Podoroska (Czech Republic) Petra Kvitová	(Italy) Martina Trevisan (Ukraine) Elina Svitolina (United States) Danielle Collins (Germany) Laura Siegemund
28 Sep; 5 Oct	French Open; Paris, France; Grand Slam; Clay (red) – € 128S/96Q/64D; Singles – Doubles − Mixed doubles	(Hungary) Tímea Babos (France) Kristina Mladenovic; 6–4, 7–5	(Chile) Alexa Guarachi (United States) Desirae Krawczyk	(Argentina) Nadia Podoroska (Czech Republic) Petra Kvitová	(Italy) Martina Trevisan (Ukraine) Elina Svitolina (United States) Danielle Collins (Germany) Laura Siegemund

=== October ===
Week	Tournament	Champions	Runners-up	Semifinalists	Quarterfinalists
12 Oct	No tournaments scheduled				
19 Oct	Ostrava Open; Ostrava, Czech Republic; WTA Premier; Hard (i) – $528,500 – 28S/16D; Singles – Doubles	(Belarus) Aryna Sabalenka; 6–2, 6–2	(Belarus) Victoria Azarenka	(Greece) Maria Sakkari (United States) Jennifer Brady	(Tunisia) Ons Jabeur (Belgium) Elise Mertens (Spain) Sara Sorribes Tormo (Russia) Veronika Kudermetova
19 Oct	Ostrava Open; Ostrava, Czech Republic; WTA Premier; Hard (i) – $528,500 – 28S/16D; Singles – Doubles	(Belgium) Elise Mertens (Belarus) Aryna Sabalenka; 6–1, 6–3	(Canada) Gabriela Dabrowski (Brazil) Luisa Stefani	(Greece) Maria Sakkari (United States) Jennifer Brady	(Tunisia) Ons Jabeur (Belgium) Elise Mertens (Spain) Sara Sorribes Tormo (Russia) Veronika Kudermetova
26 Oct	No tournaments scheduled				

=== November ===
Week	Tournament	Champions	Runners-up	Semifinalists	Quarterfinalists
2 Nov	No tournaments scheduled				
9 Nov	Linz Open; Linz, Austria; WTA International; Hard (i) – $225,500 – 32S/16D; Singles – Doubles	(Belarus) Aryna Sabalenka; 7–5, 6–2	(Belgium) Elise Mertens	(Czech Republic) Barbora Krejčíková (Russia) Ekaterina Alexandrova	(France) Océane Dodin (Belarus) Aliaksandra Sasnovich (Argentina) Nadia Podoroska (Russia) Veronika Kudermetova
9 Nov	Linz Open; Linz, Austria; WTA International; Hard (i) – $225,500 – 32S/16D; Singles – Doubles	(Netherlands) Arantxa Rus (Slovenia) Tamara Zidanšek; 6–3, 6–4	(Czech Republic) Lucie Hradecká (Czech Republic) Kateřina Siniaková	(Czech Republic) Barbora Krejčíková (Russia) Ekaterina Alexandrova	(France) Océane Dodin (Belarus) Aliaksandra Sasnovich (Argentina) Nadia Podoroska (Russia) Veronika Kudermetova

== Affected tournaments ==
The COVID-19 pandemic affected many tournaments on the WTA Tour. The following tournaments were suspended or postponed.

Week	Tournament	Status
17 Feb	Hungarian Ladies Open; Debrecen, Hungary; WTA International; Hard (i) – 32S/24Q/16D	Cancelled due to organiser disagreements
9 Mar; 16 Mar	Indian Wells Open; Indian Wells, United States; WTA Premier Mandatory; Hard – $ – 96S/48Q/32D	Cancelled
23 Mar; 30 Mar	Miami Open; Miami Gardens, United States; WTA Premier Mandatory; Hard – $ – 96S/48Q/32D	Cancelled
6 Apr	Charleston Open; Charleston, United States; WTA Premier; Clay – $848,000 (Green) – 56S/32Q/16D	Played as a team exhibition tournament from 22 to 28 June
6 Apr	Copa Colsanitas; Bogotá, Colombia; WTA International; Clay (red) – $275,000 – 32S/24Q/16D	Cancelled
13 Apr	Fed Cup Finals; Budapest, Hungary; Clay (red) (i) – 12 teams	Postponed to 13–18 April 2021
20 Apr	Stuttgart Open; Stuttgart, Germany; WTA Premier; Clay (red) (i) – € – 28S/32Q/16D	Cancelled
20 Apr	İstanbul Open; Istanbul, Turkey; WTA International; Clay (red) – $275,000 – 32S/24Q/16D	Rescheduled to 7 September
April 27	Prague Open; Prague, Czech Republic; WTA International; Clay (red) – $275,000 – 32S/24Q/16D	Rescheduled to 10 August
4 May	Madrid Open; Madrid, Spain; WTA Premier Mandatory; Clay (red) – € – 64S/32Q/28D	Initially rescheduled to September, but later cancelled
11 May	Italian Open; Rome, Italy; WTA Premier 5 Clay (red) – $3,528,000 – 56S/32Q/28D	Rescheduled to September
18 May	Internationaux de Strasbourg; Strasbourg, France; WTA International; Clay (red) – $275,000 – 32S/24Q/16D	Rescheduled to September
18 May	Morocco Open; Rabat, Morocco; WTA International; Clay (red) – $275,000 – 32S/24Q/16D	Cancelled
25 May; 1 Jun	French Open; Paris, France; Grand Slam; Clay (red)	Rescheduled to 28 September
8 Jun	Nottingham Open; Nottingham, United Kingdom; WTA International; Grass – $275,000 – 32S/24Q/16D	Cancelled
8 Jun	Rosmalen Grass Court Championships 's-Hertogenbosch, Netherlands; WTA International; Grass – $275,000 – 32S/24Q/16D	Cancelled
15 Jun	German Open; Berlin, Germany; WTA Premier; Grass – $1,088,000 – 32S/24Q/16D	Cancelled
15 Jun	Birmingham Classic; Birmingham, United Kingdom; WTA International; Grass – $275,000 – 32S/24Q/16D	Cancelled
22 Jun	Eastbourne International; Eastbourne, United Kingdom; WTA Premier; Grass – $1,122,000 – 48S/16Q/16D	Cancelled
22 Jun	Bad Homburg Open; Bad Homburg vor der Höhe, Germany; WTA International; Grass – $275,000 – 32S/8Q/16D	Cancelled
29 Jun; 6 Jul	Wimbledon; London, United Kingdom; Grand Slam; Grass	Cancelled
13 Jul	Bucharest Open; Bucharest, Romania; WTA International; Clay (red) – $275,000 – 32S/24Q/16D	Cancelled
13 Jul	Swiss Open; Lausanne, Switzerland; WTA International; Clay (red) – $275,000 – 32S/24Q/16D	Cancelled
20 Jul	Baltic Open; Jūrmala, Latvia; WTA International; Clay (red) – $275,000 – 32S/24Q/16D	Cancelled
20 Jul	Palermo Open; Palermo, Italy; WTA International; Clay (red)	Rescheduled to 3 August
27 Jul	Summer Olympic Games; Tokyo, Japan; Olympic Games; Hard	Rescheduled to 26 July 2021
3 Aug	Silicon Valley Classic; San Jose, United States; WTA Premier; Hard – $ – 28S/16Q/16D	Cancelled
3 Aug	Washington Open; Washington, D.C., United States; WTA International; Hard – $275,000 – 32S/16Q/16D	Cancelled
10 Aug	Canadian Open; Montreal, Canada; WTA Premier 5 Hard – 56S/32Q/28D	Cancelled
17 Aug	Cincinnati Open; Mason, United States; WTA Premier 5 Hard	Rescheduled to 22 August and moved from Mason, Ohio to New York City
24 Aug	Albany Open; Albany, United States; WTA International; Hard – $275,000 – 32S/24Q/16D	Cancelled
14 Sep	Zhengzhou Open; Zhengzhou, China; WTA Premier; Hard – $ – 28S/24Q/16D	Initially rescheduled to October, but later cancelled
14 Sep	Jiangxi Open; Nanchang, China; WTA International; Hard – $275,000 – 32S/24Q/16D	Initially rescheduled to October, but later cancelled
14 Sep	Japan Women's Open; Hiroshima, Japan; WTA International; Hard – $275,000 – 32S/24Q/16D	Cancelled
21 Sep	Pan Pacific Open; Tokyo, Japan; WTA Premier; Hard (i) – $ – 28S/24Q/16D	Initially rescheduled to November, but later cancelled
21 Sep	Guangzhou Open; Guangzhou, China; WTA International; Hard – $525,000 – 32S/24Q/16D	Initially rescheduled to November, but later cancelled
21 Sep	Korea Open; Seoul, South Korea; WTA International; Hard – $225,500 – 32S/24Q/16D	Cancelled
28 Sep	Wuhan Open; Wuhan, China; WTA Premier 5 Hard – $ – 56S/32Q/28D	Initially rescheduled to October, but later cancelled
5 Oct	China Open; Beijing, China; WTA Premier Mandatory; Hard – $ – 60S/32Q/28D	Cancelled
12 Oct	Hong Kong Open; Hong Kong; WTA International; Hard – $525,000 – 32S/24Q/16D	Cancelled
12 Oct	Tianjin Open; Tianjin, China; WTA International; Hard – $275,000 – 32S/24Q/16D	Cancelled
12 Oct	Linz Open; Linz, Austria; WTA International; Hard – $275,000 – 32S/24Q/16D	Rescheduled to 9 November
19 Oct	Kremlin Cup; Moscow, Russia; WTA Premier; Hard (i) – $528,500 – 28S/24Q/16D	Initially provisionally rescheduled to 2 November, but later cancelled (postponed to 2021)
19 Oct	Luxembourg Open; Kockelscheuer, Luxembourg; WTA International; Hard (i) – $275,000 – 32S/24Q/16D	Cancelled
26 Oct	WTA Elite Trophy; Zhuhai, China; Year-end championships Hard – $2,600,000 – 12S(RR)/6D(RR)	Cancelled
2 Nov	WTA Finals; Shenzhen, China; Year-end championships Hard (i) – $14,000,000 – 8S(RR)/8D(RR)	Cancelled

== Statistical information ==
These tables present the number of singles (S), doubles (D), and mixed doubles (X) titles won by each player and each nation during the season, within all the tournament categories of the 2019 WTA Tour: the Grand Slam tournaments, the year-end championships (the WTA Tour Championships and the WTA Elite Trophy), the WTA Premier tournaments (Premier Mandatory, Premier 5, and regular Premier), and the WTA International tournaments. The players/nations are sorted by:

1. total number of titles (a doubles title won by two players representing the same nation counts as only one win for the nation);
2. cumulated importance of those titles (one Grand Slam win equalling two Premier Mandatory/Premier 5 wins, one year-end championships win equalling one-and-a-half Premier Mandatory/Premier 5 win, one Premier Mandatory/Premier 5 win equalling two Premier wins, one Premier win equalling two International wins);
3. a singles > doubles > mixed doubles hierarchy;
4. alphabetical order (by family names for players).

=== Key ===
Grand Slam tournaments
Year-end championships
WTA Premier Mandatory
WTA Premier 5
WTA Premier
WTA International

=== Titles won by player ===
Total	Player	Grand Slam			Year-end		Premier Mandatory		Premier 5		Premier		International		Total		
Total	Player	S	D	X	S	D	S	D	S	D	S	D	S	D	S	D	X
4	Aryna Sabalenka (BLR)								●		●	●	●		3	1	0
4	Hsieh Su-wei (TPE)									● ●		● ●			0	4	0
4	Barbora Strýcová (CZE)									● ●		● ●			0	4	0
3	Simona Halep (ROU)								●		●		●		3	0	0
2	Sofia Kenin (USA)	●											●		2	0	0
2	Tímea Babos (HUN)		● ●												0	2	0
2	Kristina Mladenovic (FRA)		● ●												0	2	0
2	Elina Svitolina (UKR)												● ●		2	0	0
2	Barbora Krejčíková (CZE)			●										●	0	1	1
2	Demi Schuurs (NED)									●				●	0	2	0
2	Nicole Melichar (USA)											●		●	0	2	0
2	Desirae Krawczyk (USA)													● ●	0	2	0
2	Arantxa Rus (NED)													● ●	0	2	0
2	Tamara Zidanšek (SLO)													● ●	0	2	0
1	Naomi Osaka (JPN)	●													1	0	0
1	Iga Świątek (POL)	●													1	0	0
1	Laura Siegemund (GER)		●												0	1	0
1	Vera Zvonareva (RUS)		●												0	1	0
1	Victoria Azarenka (BLR)								●						1	0	0
1	Květa Peschke (CZE)									●					0	1	0
1	Ashleigh Barty (AUS)										●				1	0	0
1	Kiki Bertens (NED)										●				1	0	0
1	Karolína Plíšková (CZE)										●				1	0	0
1	Shuko Aoyama (JPN)											●			0	1	0
1	Elise Mertens (BEL)											●			0	1	0
1	Ena Shibahara (JPN)											●			0	1	0
1	Xu Yifan (CHN)											●			0	1	0
1	Ekaterina Alexandrova (RUS)												●		1	0	0
1	Jennifer Brady (USA)												●		1	0	0
1	Fiona Ferro (FRA)												●		1	0	0
1	Magda Linette (POL)												●		1	0	0
1	Elena Rybakina (KAZ)												●		1	0	0
1	Patricia Maria Țig (ROU)												●		1	0	0
1	Heather Watson (GBR)												●		1	0	0
1	Serena Williams (USA)												●		1	0	0
1	Kateryna Bondarenko (UKR)													●	0	1	0
1	Hayley Carter (USA)													●	0	1	0
1	Sharon Fichman (CAN)													●	0	1	0
1	Alexa Guarachi (CHI)													●	0	1	0
1	Lucie Hradecká (CZE)													●	0	1	0
1	Nadiia Kichenok (UKR)													●	0	1	0
1	Sania Mirza (IND)													●	0	1	0
1	Asia Muhammad (USA)													●	0	1	0
1	Giuliana Olmos (MEX)													●	0	1	0
1	Laura Ioana Paar (ROU)													●	0	1	0
1	Kristýna Plíšková (CZE)													●	0	1	0
1	Arina Rodionova (AUS)													●	0	1	0
1	Storm Sanders (AUS)													●	0	1	0
1	Kateřina Siniaková (CZE)													●	0	1	0
1	Luisa Stefani (BRA)													●	0	1	0
1	Taylor Townsend (USA)													●	0	1	0
1	Julia Wachaczyk (GER)													●	0	1	0

=== Titles won by nation ===
Total	Nation	Grand Slam			Year-end		Premier Mandatory		Premier 5		Premier		International		Total		
Total	Nation	S	D	X	S	D	S	D	S	D	S	D	S	D	S	D	X
10	United States (USA)	1										1	3	5	4	6	0
9	Czech Republic (CZE)			1						3	1	2		2	1	7	1
5	Belarus (BLR)								2		1	1	1		4	1	0
5	Romania (ROU)								1		1		2	1	4	1	0
5	Netherlands (NED)									1	1			3	1	4	0
4	Chinese Taipei (TPE)									2		2			0	4	0
4	Ukraine (UKR)												2	2	2	2	0
3	France (FRA)		2										1		1	2	0
2	Japan (JPN)	1										1			1	1	0
2	Poland (POL)	1											1		2	0	0
2	Hungary (HUN)		2												0	2	0
2	Russia (RUS)		1										1		1	1	0
2	Germany (GER)		1											1	0	2	0
2	Australia (AUS)										1			1	1	1	0
2	Slovenia (SLO)													2	0	2	0
1	Belgium (BEL)											1			0	1	0
1	China (CHN)											1			0	1	0
1	Great Britain (GBR)												1		1	0	0
1	Kazakhstan (KAZ)												1		1	0	0
1	Brazil (BRA)													1	0	1	0
1	Canada (CAN)													1	0	1	0
1	Chile (CHI)													1	0	1	0
1	India (IND)													1	0	1	0
1	Mexico (MEX)													1	0	1	0

=== Titles information ===
The following players won their first main circuit title in singles, doubles, or mixed doubles:

Singles

- (Russia) Ekaterina Alexandrova (25 years, 57 days) – Shenzhen (draw)
- (United States) Jennifer Brady (25 years, 126 days) – Lexington (draw)
- (Romania) Patricia Maria Țig (26 years, 48 days) – İstanbul (draw)
- (Poland) Iga Świątek (19 years, 132 days) – **French Open** (**draw**)

Doubles

- (United States) Taylor Townsend – Auckland (draw)
- (Australia) Arina Rodionova – Hua Hin (draw)
- (Romania) Laura Ioana Paar – Lyon (draw)
- (Germany) Julia Wachaczyk – Lyon (draw)

The following players defended a main circuit title in singles, doubles, or mixed doubles:

Singles

- (Czech Republic) Karolína Plíšková – Brisbane (draw)
- (Netherlands) Kiki Bertens – St. Petersburg (draw)

Doubles

- (Chinese Taipei) Hsieh Su-wei – Dubai (draw)
- (Czech Republic) Barbora Strýcová – Dubai (draw)
- (Hungary) Tímea Babos – **French Open** (**draw**)
- (France) Kristina Mladenovic – **French Open** (**draw**)

Mixed doubles

- (Czech Republic) Barbora Krejčíková – **Australian Open (draw)**

=== Best ranking ===
The following players achieved their career high ranking in this season inside top 50 (in bold the players who entered the top 10 for the first time).

(Note: Name and ranking in bold means the player entered top 10 for the first time, and only the ranking in bold means the player had entered top 10 before, but it's his/her highest ranking.)
Singles

- (Croatia) Petra Martić (reached place No. 14 on January 13)
- (Ukraine) Dayana Yastremska (reached place No. 21 on January 20)
- (Russia) Veronika Kudermetova (reached place No. 38 on February 3)
- (Switzerland) Belinda Bencic (reached place **No. 4** on February 17)
- (Russia) Ekaterina Alexandrova (reached place No. 25 on February 17)
- (Poland) Magda Linette (reached place No. 33 on February 17)
- (Kazakhstan) Elena Rybakina (reached place No. 17 on February 24)
- (Greece) Maria Sakkari (reached place No. 20 on February 24)
- (China) Zheng Saisai (reached place No. 34 on March 2)
- (United States) **Sofia Kenin** (reached place **No. 4** on March 9)
- (Tunisia) Ons Jabeur (reached place No. 31 on August 31)
- (Czech Republic) Marie Bouzková (reached place No. 46 on August 31)
- (Poland) Iga Świątek (reached place No. 17 on October 12)
- (France) Fiona Ferro (reached place No. 42 on October 12)
- (Argentina) Nadia Podoroska (reached place No. 48 on October 12)
- (United States) Jennifer Brady (reached place No. 24 on October 26)
- (United States) Coco Gauff (reached place No. 47 on October 26)

Doubles

- (China) **Xu Yifan** (reached place **No. 7** on January 13)
- (Ukraine) Lyudmyla Kichenok (reached place No. 32 on January 13)
- (United States) Alison Riske (reached place No. 40 on January 13)
- (Ukraine) Nadiia Kichenok (reached place No. 32 on January 20)
- (China) Duan Yingying (reached place No. 16 on February 3)
- (Spain) Sara Sorribes Tormo (reached place No. 40 on February 3)
- (Germany) Anna-Lena Friedsam (reached place No. 41 on February 3)
- (United States) Coco Gauff (reached place No. 42 on February 3)
- (Japan) Shuko Aoyama (reached place No. 21 on February 17)
- (United States) Kaitlyn Christian (reached place No. 50 on February 17)
- (United States) Caroline Dolehide (reached place No. 30 on February 24)
- (Latvia) Jeļena Ostapenko (reached place No. 17 on March 2)
- (United States) Caty McNally (reached place No. 38 on March 9)
- (Czech Republic) Kristýna Plíšková (reached place No. 45 on August 17)
- (United States) Sofia Kenin (reached place No. 31 on August 31)
- (Australia) Ellen Perez (reached place No. 40 on August 31)
- (Russia) Veronika Kudermetova (reached place No. 22 on September 14)
- (Germany) Laura Siegemund (reached place No. 33 on September 14)
- (Russia) Anna Blinkova (reached place No. 45 on September 14)
- (United States) Hayley Carter (reached place No. 31 on September 21)
- (Brazil) Luisa Stefani (reached place No. 32 on September 28)
- (Japan) Ena Shibahara (reached place No. 23 on October 12)
- (United States) Desirae Krawczyk (reached place No. 25 on October 12)
- (Chile) Alexa Guarachi (reached place No. 26 on October 12)
- (United States) Asia Muhammad (reached place No. 35 on October 12)
- (Belarus) Aliaksandra Sasnovich (reached place No. 43 on October 12)

== Points distribution ==
Category	W	F	SF	QF	R16	R32	R64	R128	Q	Q3	Q2	Q1
Grand Slam (S)	2000	1300	780	430	240	130	70	10	40	30	20	2
Grand Slam (D)	2000	1300	780	430	240	130	10	–	40	–	–	–
WTA Finals (S)	1500*	1080*	750*	(+125 per round robin match; +125 per round robin win)								
WTA Finals (D)	1500	1080	750	375	–							
WTA Premier Mandatory (96S)	1000	650	390	215	120	65	35	10	30	–	20	2
WTA Premier Mandatory (64/60S)	1000	650	390	215	120	65	10	–	30	–	20	2
WTA Premier Mandatory (28/32D)	1000	650	390	215	120	10	–	–	–	–	–	–
WTA Premier 5 (56S, 64Q)	900	585	350	190	105	60	1	–	30	22	15	1
WTA Premier 5 (56S, 48/32Q)	900	585	350	190	105	60	1	–	30	–	20	1
WTA Premier 5 (28D)	900	585	350	190	105	1	–	–	–	–	–	–
WTA Premier 5 (16D)	900	585	350	190	1	–	–	–	–	–	–	–
WTA Premier (56S)	470	305	185	100	55	30	1	–	25	–	13	1
WTA Premier (32/30/28S)	470	305	185	100	55	1	–	–	25	18	13	1
WTA Premier (16D)	470	305	185	100	1	–	–	–	–	–	–	–
WTA Elite Trophy (S)	700*	440*	240*	(+40 per round robin match; +80 per round robin win)								
WTA International (32S, 32Q)	280	180	110	60	30	1	–	–	18	14	10	1
WTA International (32S, 24/16Q)	280	180	110	60	30	1	–	–	18	-	12	1
WTA International (16D)	280	180	110	60	1	–	–	–	–	–	–	–

S = singles players, D = doubles teams, Q = qualification players.
* Assumes undefeated round robin match record.

== WTA rankings ==
These are the WTA rankings and yearly WTA Race rankings of the top 20 singles and doubles players at the current date of the 2020 season. Rankings were frozen due to the COVID-19 pandemic from 16 March 2020 up until the resumption of the season on 3 August 2020. The 2020 WTA Finals was then cancelled on 24 July 2020 due to the pandemic, so below are the unofficial WTA Singles and Doubles Race rankings for only 2020 events.

=== Singles ===
Unofficial Final Singles race rankings
No.	Player	Points	Move^{†}	Tourn
1	Sofia Kenin (USA)	3,934	Steady	10
2	Naomi Osaka (JPN)	2,900	Steady	4
3	Simona Halep (ROU)	2,770	Steady	6
4	Victoria Azarenka (BLR)	2,767	Steady	7
5	Iga Świątek (POL)	2,432	Steady	6
6	Aryna Sabalenka (BLR)	2,420	▲2	12
7	Petra Kvitová (CZE)	2,321	▼1	7
8	Garbiñe Muguruza (ESP)	2,310	▼1	8
9	Elise Mertens (BEL)	2,036	Steady	13
10	Elena Rybakina (KAZ)	1,732	Steady	12
11	Jennifer Brady (USA)	1,677	Steady	11
12	Ashleigh Barty (AUS)	1,601	Steady	4
13	Karolína Plíšková (CZE)	1,532	Steady	9
14	Ons Jabeur (TUN)	1,445	Steady	11
15	Serena Williams (USA)	1,425	Steady	6
16	Anett Kontaveit (EST)	1,381	Steady	11
17	Elina Svitolina (UKR)	1,374	Steady	10
18	Maria Sakkari (GRE)	1,333	Steady	11
19	Nadia Podoroska (ARG)	1,275	Steady	13
20	Ekaterina Alexandrova (RUS)	1,189	▲2	14

Player would have qualified for the 2020 WTA Finals

†Change since previous week's rankings

WTA Singles Year-End Rankings
No.	Player	Points	#Trn	'19 Rk	High	Low	'19→'20
1	Ashleigh Barty (AUS)	8,717	17	1	1	1	Steady
2	Simona Halep (ROU)	7,255	17	4	2	4	▲2
3	Naomi Osaka (JPN)	5,780	16	3	3	10	Steady
4	Sofia Kenin (USA)	5,760	25	14	4	15	▲10
5	Elina Svitolina (UKR)	5,260	26	6	5	7	▲1
6	Karolína Plíšková (CZE)	5,205	21	2	2	6	▼4
7	Bianca Andreescu (CAN)	4,555	10	5	4	7	▼2
8	Petra Kvitová (CZE)	4,516	16	7	7	12	▼1
9	Kiki Bertens (NED)	4,505	26	9	6	10	Steady
10	Aryna Sabalenka (BLR)	4,220	27	11	10	13	▲1
11	Serena Williams (USA)	4,080	13	10	8	11	▼1
12	Belinda Bencic (SUI)	4,010	25	8	4	12	▼4
13	Victoria Azarenka (BLR)	3,426	18	50	13	59	▲37
14	Johanna Konta (GBR)	3,152	18	12	12	16	▼2
15	Garbiñe Muguruza (ESP)	3,016	17	35	15	35	▲20
16	Madison Keys (USA)	2,962	16	13	11	16	▼3
17	Iga Świątek (POL)	2,960	16	60	17	60	▲43
18	Petra Martić (CRO)	2,850	24	15	14	18	▼3
19	Elena Rybakina (KAZ)	2,696	29	36	17	36	▲17
20	Elise Mertens (BEL)	2,650	30	17	17	23	▼3

==== Number 1 ranking ====
Holder	Date gained	Date forfeited
Ashleigh Barty (AUS)	Year end 2019	Year end 2020

=== Doubles ===
Unofficial Final Doubles team race rankings
No.	Team	Points	Move^{†}	Tourn
1	Tímea Babos (HUN); Kristina Mladenovic (FRA)	4,470	Steady	4
2	Hsieh Su-wei (TPE); Barbora Strýcová (CZE)	4,280	Steady	6
3	Barbora Krejčíková (CZE); Kateřina Siniaková (CZE)	2,485	Steady	6
4	Nicole Melichar (USA); Xu Yifan (CHN)	2,105	Steady	7
5	Hayley Carter (USA); Luisa Stefani (BRA)	1,951	Steady	11
6	Shuko Aoyama (JPN); Ena Shibahara (JPN)	1,928	Steady	11
7	Alexa Guarachi (CHI); Desirae Krawczyk (USA)	1,807	Steady	7
8	Květa Peschke (CZE); Demi Schuurs (NED)	1,641	Steady	7
9	Elise Mertens (BEL); Aryna Sabalenka (BLR)	1,600	Steady	7
10	Gabriela Dabrowski (CAN); Jeļena Ostapenko (LAT)	1,365	Steady	4

Team would have qualified for the 2020 WTA Finals

†Change since previous week's rankings

WTA Doubles Year-End Rankings
No.	Team	Points	#Trn	'19 Rk	High	Low	'19→'20
1	Hsieh Su-wei (TPE)	9,010	19	4	1	4	▲3
2	Barbora Strýcová (CZE)	8,945	19	1	1	4	▼1
3	Kristina Mladenovic (FRA)	8,115	13	2	1	3	▼1
4	Tímea Babos (HUN)	7,955	14	3	2	4	▼1
5	Aryna Sabalenka (BLR)	7,575	17	5	5	5	Steady
6	Elise Mertens (BEL)	7,490	16	6	6	6	Steady
7	Barbora Krejčíková (CZE)	5,955	16	13	7	14	▲6
8	Kateřina Siniaková (CZE)	5,865	20	7	7	10	▼1
9	Xu Yifan (CHN)	5,820	22	8	7	10	▼1
10	Gabriela Dabrowski (CAN)	5,675	26	8	7	10	▼2
11	Nicole Melichar (USA)	4,730	28	20	11	20	▲9
12	Demi Schuurs (NED)	4,730	24	14	11	14	▲2
13	Anna-Lena Grönefeld (GER)	4,495	17	11	11	13	▼2
14	Ashleigh Barty (AUS)	4,060	12	19	13	19	▲5
15	Latisha Chan (TPE)	3,905	21	15	12	15	Steady
15	Chan Hao-ching (TPE)	3,905	21	15	12	15	Steady
17	Květa Peschke (CZE)	3,820	24	21	17	24	▲4
18	Duan Yingying (CHN)	3,810	24	17	16	18	▼1
19	Jeļena Ostapenko (LAT)	3,680	18	22	17	23	▲3
20	Bethanie Mattek-Sands (USA)	3,640	16	24	19	25	▲4

==== Number 1 ranking ====
Holder	Date gained	Date forfeited
Barbora Strýcová (CZE)	Year end 2019	2 February 2020
Hsieh Su-wei (TPE)	3 February 2020	23 February 2020
Kristina Mladenovic (FRA)	24 February 2020	1 March 2020
Hsieh Su-wei (TPE)	2 March 2020	Year end 2020

== Prize money leaders ==
Prize money in US$ as of 9 November 2020
#	Player	Singles	Doubles	Mixed	Year-to-date
1	Sofia Kenin (USA)	$4,187,581	$115,389	$0	$4,302,970
2	Naomi Osaka (JPN)	$3,352,755	$0	$0	$3,352,755
3	Iga Świątek (POL)	$2,179,271	$73,626	$8,316	$2,261,213
4	Victoria Azarenka (BLR)	$1,959,453	$32,330	$0	$1,991,783
5	Garbiñe Muguruza (ESP)	$1,942,072	$0	$0	$1,942,072
6	Simona Halep (ROU)	$1,928,119	$9,771	$0	$1,937,890
7	Petra Kvitová (CZE)	$1,505,967	$0	$0	$1,505,967
8	Jennifer Brady (USA)	$1,245,741	$74,215	$0	$1,319,956
9	Aryna Sabalenka (BLR)	$1,087,700	$126,984	$0	$1,214,684
10	Elise Mertens (BEL)	$985,904	$123,654	$0	$1,109,558

== Retirements ==
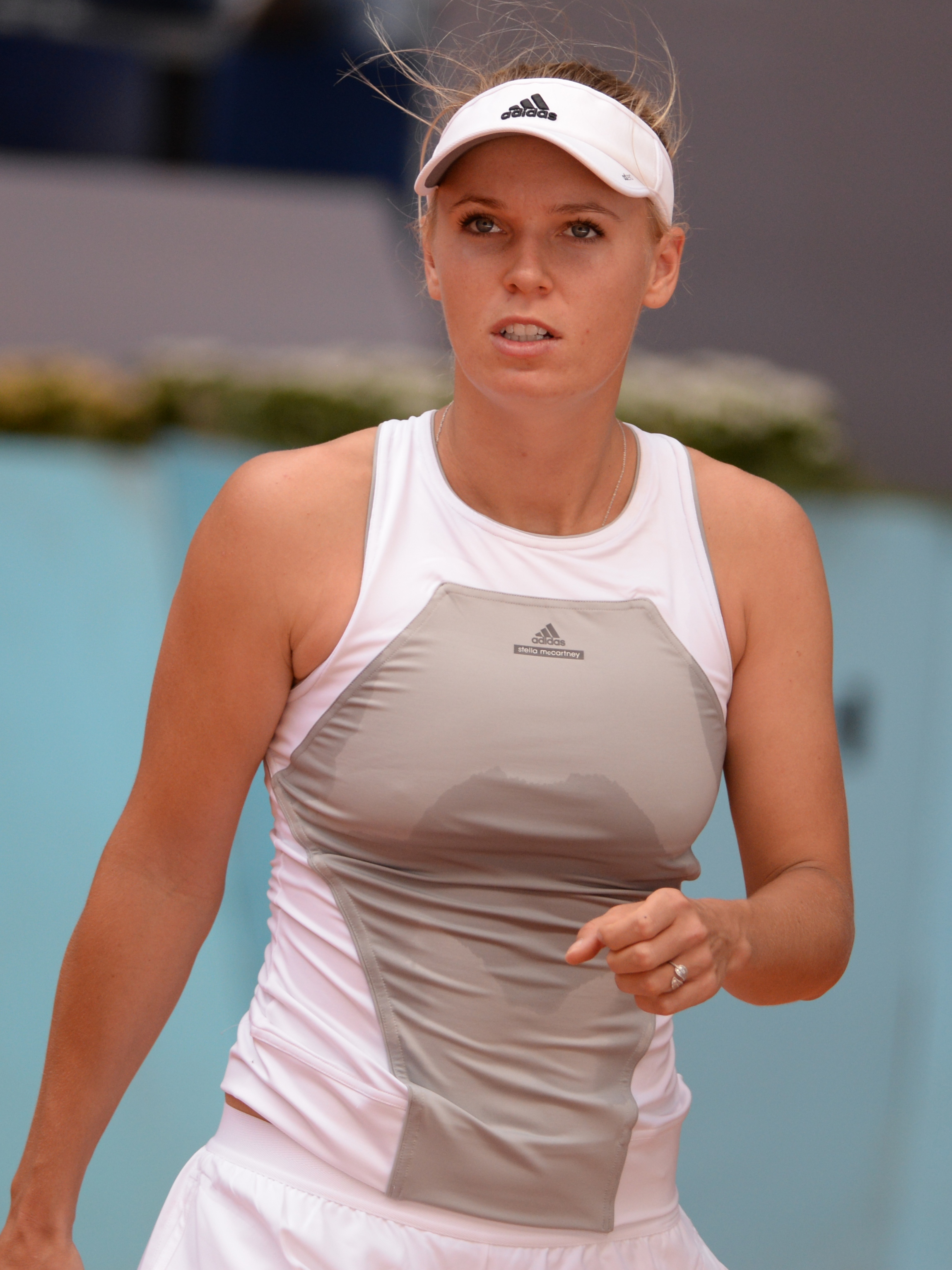
Former world no. 1 Caroline Wozniacki retired after her third round defeat at the 2020 Australian Open.

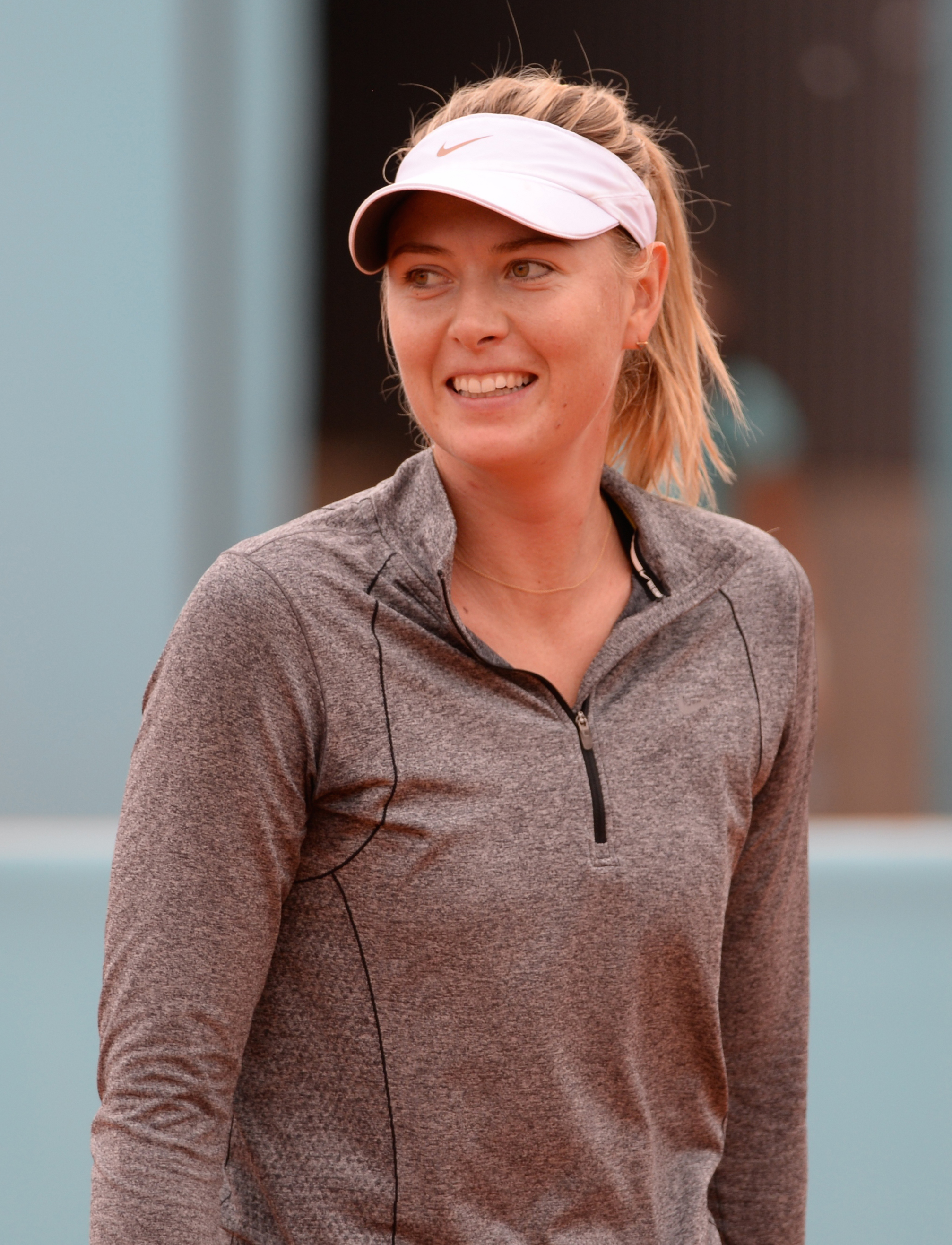
Former world no. 1 and career Grand Slam holder Maria Sharapova retires at the age of 32.

Following is a list of notable players (winners of a main tour title, and/or part of the WTA rankings top 100 in singles or doubles, for at least one week; and wheelchair players) who announced their retirement from professional tennis, became inactive (after not playing for more than 52 weeks), or were permanently banned from playing, during the 2020 season:

- Marjolein Buis (born 11 January 1988 in Nijmegen, Netherlands)
- Estrella Cabeza Candela (born 20 February 1987 in Los Palacios y Villafranca, Spain) turned professional in 2004 and reached a career high ranking of 95 in singles and 176 in doubles. Cabeza Candela also won 13 singles and 16 doubles titles on the ITF Women's Circuit. In 2020, Cabeza Candela announced her retirement on the tour.
- Rika Fujiwara (born 19 September 1981 in Tokyo, Japan) turned professional in 1997 and reached a career high ranking of 84 in singles and 13 in doubles. Fujiwara reached six WTA doubles finals during her career, winning one of them at the Danish Open in 2012. Fujiwara also won 9 singles and 36 doubles titles on the ITF Women's Circuit. Fujiwara's biggest highlight was at the 2002 French Open, where she reached the women's doubles semifinals partnering her compatriot Ai Sugiyama. In March 2020, Fujiwara announced her retirement after 23 years on the tour.
- Julia Görges (born 2 November 1988 in Bad Oldesloe, West Germany) (modern day Germany) turned professional in 2005 and reached a career high ranking of 9 in singles and 12 in doubles. Görges won 7 WTA singles titles in her career, including 2 premier level events and the 2017 WTA Elite Trophy. She scored multiple career top ten wins in her career including back to back wins against the then World no. 1 Caroline Wozniacki during the clay season in 2011. Her best grand slam result was a semifinal at 2018 Wimbledon Championships. Görges announced her retirement via social media on 21 October.
- (United States) Jamie Hampton (born 8 January 1990 in Frankfurt, West Germany) turned professional in 2009 and reached a career high ranking of 24 in singles and 74 in doubles. Hampton reached one WTA singles final during her career, losing to Elena Vesnina at the 2013 Aegon International. She reached the fourth round at the 2013 French Open, and scored wins over multiple current and former top-10 players during her short-lived career, including Petra Kvitová, Agnieszka Radwańska and Caroline Wozniacki. She had not played since January 2014 and, after undergoing six surgery attempts, decided to retire in May.
- Johanna Larsson (born 17 August 1988 in Boden, Sweden) turned professional in 2006 and reached a career high ranking of 45 in singles and 20 in doubles. Larsson won two WTA singles titles during her career, including at her home event in Båstad in 2015, and enjoyed considerable success in doubles, winning 14 titles and reaching the year-end championships final in 2017 alongside Kiki Bertens. Larsson decided to retire in February.
- Ekaterina Makarova (born 7 June 1988 in Moscow, Russian SFSR, Soviet Union) (modern-day Russia) turned professional in 2004 and reached a career high ranking of 8 in singles in 2015 and number 1 in doubles in 2018. A six-time Grand Slam singles quarterfinalist with two semifinal appearances at the 2014 US Open and 2015 Australian Open, Makarova also won three WTA singles titles during her career. She achieved phenomenal success in doubles, with 3 Grand Slam women's doubles titles alongside Elena Vesnina at the 2013 French Open, the 2014 US Open and at Wimbledon in 2017, as well as the mixed doubles title at the 2012 US Open alongside Bruno Soares. She also partnered Vesnina to gold in the women's doubles at the 2016 Olympics, and to the title at the WTA Finals, also in 2016. Makarova announced her retirement at the 2020 St. Petersburg Ladies' Trophy.
- María José Martínez Sánchez (born 12 August 1982 in Murcia, Spain) turned professional in 1998 and reached a career-high ranking of 19 in singles in 2010 and 4 in doubles, also in 2010. Through her career she won a total of 5 WTA titles in singles but focused primarily in doubles later in her career winning a total of 21 titles in that discipline. In doubles she reached the semi-finals of Grand Slams 3 times; at the French Open in 2010 and 2012 and at the US Open in 2012. She reached the quarter-finals of all slams in doubles. In 2009 she won the Tour Finals with long time doubles partner Nuria Llagostera Vives. In January 2020 she announced her retirement.
- Jessica Moore (born 16 August 1990 in Perth, Australia) turned professional in 2008 and reached a career-high ranking of 132 in singles in 2008 and 55 in doubles in 2019. Moore won two WTA titles in doubles, as well as 4 singles and 31 doubles titles on the ITF Circuit. She also won silver at the 2010 Commonwealth Games in the women's doubles, partnering Olivia Rogowska. Moore announced her retirement at the Australian Open.
- Aleksandrina Naydenova (born 29 February 1992 in Plovdiv, Bulgaria), a former world number 95 in doubles. Was given a lifetime ban from competition by the Tennis Integrity Unit (TIU).
- Romina Oprandi (born 29 March 1986 in Jegenstorf, Switzerland) turned professional in 2005 and reached career-high rankings of 32 in singles in 2013, and 112 in doubles in 2007. Oprandi won one WTA title in doubles, as well as 26 singles and 11 doubles titles on the ITF Circuit. In May 2020 she announced her retirement.
- Pauline Parmentier (born 31 January 1986 in Cucq, France) turned professional in 2000 and reached a career-high ranking of 40 in singles, in July 2008, and 121 in doubles in October 2019. Winner of 4 singles titles on the main tour and a total of 13 ITF titles. Her best result at Grand Slam level came in reaching the fourth round at her home slam the French Open in 2014. She announced in January 2019 that this would be her last year on the tour.
- Teliana Pereira (born 20 July 1988 in Águas Belas, Brazil) turned professional in 2005 and reached a career-high ranking of 43 in singles, in October 2015, and 117 in doubles, in September 2013. Winner of 2 singles titles on the main tour and a 22 ITF titles in single and 10 in doubles. Her best result at Grand Slam level came in reaching the second round at the French Open in 2014, 2015 and 2016. In September 2020, she announced her retirement.
- Magdaléna Rybáriková (born 4 October 1988 in Piešťany, Slovakia) turned professional in 2005, and reached career-high rankings of 17 in singles in 2018, and 50 in doubles in 2011. Winner of 4 singles titles and 1 doubles title on the main tour (with Janette Husárová), Rybáriková's best result is reaching the singles semifinals at 2017 Wimbledon Championships. At first she has announced the retirement from tennis after the 2020 Fed Cup finals in Budapest, but later she announced her official retirement via social media on 29 October.
- Maria Sharapova (born 19 April 1987 in Nyagan, Russian SFSR, Soviet Union) (modern day Russia) turned professional in 2001 and reached the world No. 1 spot for the first time in 2005. A five-time Grand Slam singles winner (she completed the career Grand Slam in 2012), Sharapova won 36 WTA singles titles and 3 doubles titles during her career. She won also the WTA Finals in 2004 and the Fed Cup in 2008. She also won the silver medal in the women's singles at the 2012 Olympics. Sharapova announced her retirement through social media in 2020.
- Sílvia Soler Espinosa (born 19 November 1987 in Elche, Spain) turned professional in 2003, and reached a career-high ranking of No. 54 in singles in 2012, and No. 39 in doubles in 2014. Soler Espinosa reached two WTA singles finals in her career, and won one doubles title alongside Andreja Klepač at the 2014 Connecticut Open. She was a three-time Grand Slam quarterfinalist in doubles, and also reached the third round on three occasions in singles, twice at the US Open and once at Roland Garros. Soler Espinosa decided to retire in May.
- (United States) Anna Tatishvili (born 3 February 1990 in Tbilisi, Georgian SSR, Soviet Union) (modern day Georgia) turned professional in 2005 and reached a career-high ranking of No. 50 in singles and 59 in doubles. She won one WTA doubles title in her career in Linz in 2014 alongside Raluca Olaru, as well as reaching two further doubles finals and winning 11 ITF Circuit singles titles. Her greatest achievement at Grand Slam-level came in reaching the fourth round at the 2012 US Open. Tatishvili decided to retire in March, after battling for several years with a persistent ankle injury.
- Caroline Wozniacki (born 11 July 1990 in Odense, Denmark) joined the circuit in 2005, and reached the world No. 1 spot for the first time in 2010. She would spend a total of 71 weeks as number one which puts her at ninth on the all-time list as of January 2020. Wozniacki won a total of 30 WTA titles in singles and 2 WTA titles in doubles. Wozniacki reached three Grand Slam finals at the US Open in 2009 and 2014 and at the Australian Open 2018 where she won her first and only Grand Slam title, beating Simona Halep. She also won the WTA Finals in Singapore 2017. Wozniacki retired after a third-round defeat by Ons Jabeur at the 2020 Australian Open.

== Comebacks ==
Following are notable players who announced their comebacks after retirements during the 2020 WTA Tour season:

- Kim Clijsters (born 8 June 1983 in Bilzen, Belgium) made her return at the 2020 Dubai Tennis Championships in February where she lost to Garbiñe Muguruza in the first round.
- (Serbia) Bojana Jovanovski Petrović
- Tsvetana Pironkova (born 13 September 1987 in Plovdiv, Bulgaria) earned entry into the 2020 US Open under a protected ranking in which she reached the quarterfinals, losing to Serena Williams. The former world number 31, winner of the 2014 Apia International Sydney, and 2010 Wimbledon Championships semifinalist last played in 2017, recovering from shoulder injuries and a pregnancy.

== See also ==
- 2020 ATP Tour
- 2020 WTA 125K series
- 2020 ITF Women's Circuit
- Women's Tennis Association
- International Tennis Federation
