= 2020 Upper Austria Ladies Linz =

- Date: 9–15 November
- Edition: 30th
- Category: WTA International
- Draw: 32S / 16D
- Prize money: $202,500
- Surface: Hard (indoor)
- Location: Linz, Austria
- Venue: TipsArena Linz

Champions

Singles
- (Belarus) Aryna Sabalenka

Doubles
- (Netherlands) Arantxa Rus / (Slovenia) Tamara Zidanšek
← 2019 ·	Linz Open	· 2021 →

The 2020 Upper Austria Ladies Linz was a women's tennis tournament played on indoor hard courts. It was the 30th edition of the Linz Open, and part of the WTA International tournaments category of the 2020 WTA Tour. Originally scheduled from 19 to 25 October 2020 at the TipsArena Linz in Linz, Austria, it was rescheduled for 9 to 15 November 2020 due to the COVID-19 pandemic.

== Finals ==
=== Singles ===
- (Belarus) Aryna Sabalenka defeated (Belgium) Elise Mertens, 7–5, 6–2

This was Sabalenka's 8th WTA singles title, and third of the year.

=== Doubles ===
(Netherlands) Arantxa Rus / (Slovenia) Tamara Zidanšek defeated (Czech Republic) Lucie Hradecká / (Czech Republic) Kateřina Siniaková, 6–3, 6–4

== Points and prize money ==
=== Point distribution ===
Event	W	F	SF	QF	Round of 16	Round of 32	Q	Q2	Q1
Singles	280	180	110	60	30	1	18	12	1
Doubles	280	180	110	60	1	—	—	—	—

=== Prize money ===
Event	W	F	SF	QF	Round of 16	Round of 32^{1}	Q2	Q1
Singles	$25,000	$14,000	$8,700	$5,000	$3,150	$2,300	$1,685	$1,100
Doubles *	$9,000	$5,000	$3,231	$1,982	$1,520	—	—	—

_{^{1} Qualifiers prize money is also the Round of 32 prize money}
_{* per team}

== Singles entrants ==
=== Seeds ===
Country	Player	Rank^{1}	Seed
BLR	Aryna Sabalenka	11	1
BEL	Elise Mertens	21	2
UKR	Dayana Yastremska	29	3
RUS	Ekaterina Alexandrova	33	4
RUS	Veronika Kudermetova	46	5
ARG	Nadia Podoroska	48	6
SUI	Jil Teichmann	57	7
USA	Bernarda Pera	61	8

- Rankings as of October 26, 2020

=== Other entrants ===
The following players received wildcards into the singles main draw:

- (Austria) Julia Grabher
- (Austria) Barbara Haas
- (Russia) Vera Zvonareva

The following players received entry from the qualifying draw:

- (France) Océane Dodin
- (Croatia) Jana Fett
- (Ukraine) Anhelina Kalinina
- (Czech Republic) Tereza Martincová
- (France) Harmony Tan
- (Switzerland) Stefanie Vögele

The following player received entry as a lucky loser:

- (Ukraine) Katarina Zavatska

=== Withdrawals ===
Before the tournament

- (Russia) Anna Blinkova → replaced by (Belarus) Aliaksandra Sasnovich
- (United States) Jennifer Brady → replaced by (Italy) Jasmine Paolini
- (France) Alizé Cornet → replaced by (Russia) Varvara Gracheva
- (Estonia) Anett Kontaveit → replaced by (Ukraine) Marta Kostyuk
- (United States) Christina McHale → replaced by (Slovenia) Tamara Zidanšek
- (Kazakhstan) Elena Rybakina → replaced by (Romania) Sorana Cîrstea
- (Romania) Patricia Maria Țig → replaced by (Slovakia) Viktória Kužmová
- (Czech Republic) Markéta Vondroušová → replaced by (Czech Republic) Barbora Krejčíková
- (United Kingdom) Heather Watson → replaced by (Ukraine) Katarina Zavatska

== Doubles entrants ==
=== Seeds ===
Country	Player	Country	Player	Rank^{1}	Seed
CZE	Lucie Hradecká	CZE	Kateřina Siniaková	42	1
CAN	Gabriela Dabrowski	RUS	Vera Zvonareva	51	2
ROU	Irina Bara	ESP	Sara Sorribes Tormo	165	3
NED	Arantxa Rus	SLO	Tamara Zidanšek	174	4

- ^{1} Rankings as of October 26, 2020

=== Other entrants ===
The following pairs received wildcards into the doubles main draw:

- (Austria) Mira Antonitsch / (Austria) Julia Grabher
- (United Kingdom) Jodie Burrage / (Germany) Sabine Lisicki
