= 2020 St. Petersburg Ladies' Trophy =

- Date: 10–16 February
- Edition: 11th
- Category: WTA Premier
- Prize money: $848,000
- Surface: Hard (indoor)
- Location: Saint Petersburg, Russia
- Venue: Sibur Arena

Champions

Singles
- (Netherlands) Kiki Bertens

Doubles
- (Japan) Shuko Aoyama / (Japan) Ena Shibahara
- St. Petersburg Ladies' Trophy

The 2020 St. Petersburg Ladies' Trophy was a professional tennis tournament played on indoor hard courts. It was the 11th edition of the tournament and a WTA Premier tournament on the 2020 WTA Tour. The tournament was held between 10 February and 16 February 2020.

== Point distribution ==
Event	W	F	SF	QF	Round of 16	Round of 32	Q	Q2	Q1
Singles	470	305	185	100	55	1	25	13	1
Doubles	470	305	185	100	1	—N/a	—N/a	—N/a	—N/a

== Prize money ==
Event	W	F	SF	QF	Round of 16	Round of 32^{1}	Q2	Q1
Singles	$146,500	$78,160	$41,680	$22,410	$12,000	$7,610	$3,720	$1,850
Doubles*	$46,000	$24,200	$13,200	$6,800	$3,700	—N/a	—N/a	—N/a

_{^{1}Qualifiers prize money is also the Round of 32 prize money.}
_{*per team}

== Singles main-draw entrants ==
=== Seeds ===
Country	Player	Rank^{1}	Seed
SUI	Belinda Bencic	5	1
NED	Kiki Bertens	8	2
CZE	Petra Kvitová	11	3
GBR	Johanna Konta	14	4
CZE	Markéta Vondroušová	17	5
GRE	Maria Sakkari	21	6
CRO	Donna Vekić	23	7
KAZ	Elena Rybakina	25	8

- ^{1} Rankings as of February 3, 2020.

=== Other entrants ===
The following players received wildcards into the singles main draw:

- (Switzerland) Belinda Bencic
- (Russia) Daria Kasatkina
- (United Kingdom) Johanna Konta
- (Russia) Svetlana Kuznetsova

The following players received entry from the qualifying draw:

- (United States) Kristie Ahn
- (France) Alizé Cornet
- (Russia) Vitalia Diatchenko
- (France) Océane Dodin
- (Russia) Anastasia Potapova
- (Russia) Liudmila Samsonova

The following player received entry as a lucky loser:

- (France) Fiona Ferro

=== Withdrawals ===
Before the tournament

- (United States) Danielle Collins → replaced by (Czech Republic) Kateřina Siniaková
- (Estonia) Anett Kontaveit → replaced by (Slovakia) Viktória Kužmová
- (Sweden) Rebecca Peterson → replaced by (United States) Jennifer Brady
- (Latvia) Anastasija Sevastova → replaced by (France) Fiona Ferro

During the tournament

- (Czech Republic) Petra Kvitová (illness)

== Doubles main-draw entrants ==
=== Seeds ===
Country	Player	Country	Player	Rank^{1}	Seed
JPN	Shuko Aoyama	JPN	Ena Shibahara	53	1
UKR	Lyudmyla Kichenok	UKR	Nadiia Kichenok	68	2
USA	Kaitlyn Christian	CHI	Alexa Guarachi	108	3
USA	Hayley Carter	CAN	Sharon Fichman	121	4

- ^{1} Rankings as of February 3, 2020.

=== Other entrants ===
The following pair received a wildcard into the doubles main draw:

- (Russia) Daria Mishina / (Russia) Ekaterina Shalimova

== Champions ==
=== Singles ===
- (Netherlands) Kiki Bertens def. (Kazakhstan) Elena Rybakina, 6–1, 6–3

=== Doubles ===
- (Japan) Shuko Aoyama / (Japan) Ena Shibahara def. (United States) Kaitlyn Christian / (Chile) Alexa Guarachi, 4–6, 6–0, [10–3]
