= 2020 Brisbane International =

Tennis tournament

- Date: 6–12 January 2020
- Edition: 12th
- Category: WTA Premier
- Prize money: $1,500,000
- Surface: Hard
- Location: Tennyson, Brisbane, Queensland, Australia
- Venue: Queensland Tennis Centre

Champions

Singles
- (Czech Republic) Karolína Plíšková

Doubles
- (Chinese Taipei) Hsieh Su-wei / (Czech Republic) Barbora Strýcová
- Brisbane International

The 2020 Brisbane International was a professional tennis tournament on the 2020 WTA Tour. It was played on outdoor hard courts in Brisbane, Queensland, Australia. This was the twelfth edition of the tournament, which took place at the Queensland Tennis Centre in Tennyson from 6 to 12 January 2020 as part of the Australian Open Series in preparation for the first Grand Slam of the year. The ATP Tour edition of the event was replaced this year by the first edition of the ATP Cup.

== Points and prize money ==
=== Point distribution ===
Event	W	F	SF	QF	Round of 16	Round of 32	Q	Q3	Q2	Q1
Singles	470	305	185	100	55	1	25	18	13	1
Doubles	470	305	185	100	1	—N/a	—N/a	—N/a	—N/a	—N/a

=== Prize money ===
Event	W	F	SF	QF	Round of 16	Round of 32^{1}	Q3	Q2	Q1
Singles	$266,000	$142,000	$75,050	$40,600	$22,050	$12,000	$6,500	$3,400	$1,900
Doubles *	$84,000	$44,800	$25,000	$12,900	$7,000	—N/a	—N/a	—N/a	—N/a

_{^{1}Qualifiers prize money is also the Round of 32 prize money.}
_{*per team}

== Singles main-draw entrants ==
=== Seeds ===
Country	Player	Rank^{1}	Seed
AUS	Ashleigh Barty	1	1
CZE	Karolína Plíšková	2	2
JPN	Naomi Osaka	3	3
UKR	Elina Svitolina	6	4
CZE	Petra Kvitová	7	5
NED	Kiki Bertens	9	6
GBR	Johanna Konta	12	7
USA	Madison Keys	13	8

- ^{1} Rankings are as of 30 December 2019.

=== Other entrants ===
The following players received wildcards into the singles main draw:

- (Australia) Priscilla Hon
- (Russia) Maria Sharapova
- (Australia) Samantha Stosur
- (Australia) Ajla Tomljanović

The following players received entry from the qualifying draw:

- (Czech Republic) Marie Bouzková
- (United States) Jennifer Brady
- (Kazakhstan) Yulia Putintseva
- (Russia) Liudmila Samsonova

== Doubles main-draw entrants ==
=== Seeds ===
Country	Player	Country	Player	Rank^{1}	Seed
TPE	Hsieh Su-wei	CZE	Barbora Strýcová	5	1
USA	Nicole Melichar	CHN	Xu Yifan	28	2
TPE	Chan Hao-ching	TPE	Latisha Chan	30	3
CZE	Květa Peschke	NED	Demi Schuurs	35	4

- ^{1} Rankings are as of 30 December 2019.

=== Other entrants ===
The following pair received a wildcard into the doubles main draw:

- (Australia) Priscilla Hon / (Australia) Storm Sanders

=== Withdrawals ===
During the tournament

- (France) Kristina Mladenovic (viral illness)

== Champions ==
=== Singles ===
- (Czech Republic) Karolína Plíšková def. (United States) Madison Keys 6–4, 4–6, 7–5

=== Doubles ===
- (Chinese Taipei) Hsieh Su-wei / (Czech Republic) Barbora Strýcová def. (Australia) Ashleigh Barty / (Netherlands) Kiki Bertens 3–6, 7–6^{(9–7)}, [10–8]
