= 2019 Upper Austria Ladies Linz – Doubles =

Doubles
- 2019 Upper Austria Ladies Linz

Final
- Champions: (Czech Republic) Barbora Krejčíková (Czech Republic) Kateřina Siniaková
- Runners-up: (Austria) Barbara Haas (Switzerland) Xenia Knoll
- Score: 6–4, 6–3

Details
- Draw: 16
- Seeds: 4

Events
Singles	Doubles
← 2018 ·	Linz Open	· 2020 →

Kirsten Flipkens and Johanna Larsson were the defending champions. Larsson chose not to participate and Flipkens was scheduled to play alongside Alison Van Uytvanck, but withdrew due to a wrist injury.

Barbora Krejčíková and Kateřina Siniaková won the title, defeating Barbara Haas and Xenia Knoll in the final, 6–4, 6–3.

== Seeds ==
1. (Czech Republic) Barbora Krejčíková / (Czech Republic) Kateřina Siniaková (champions)
2. (Poland) Alicja Rosolska / (Czech Republic) Renata Voráčová (quarterfinals)
3. (Germany) Laura Siegemund / (Slovenia) Katarina Srebotnik (quarterfinals)
4. (Russia) Anna Blinkova / (Japan) Makoto Ninomiya (quarterfinals)

== Draw ==
=== Key ===
- Q = Qualifier
- WC = Wild card
- LL = Lucky loser
- Alt = Alternate
- ITF = ITF entry
- PR = Protected ranking
- SR = Special ranking
- SE = Special exempt
- JE = Junior exempt
- JR = Junior Accelerator Programme entrant
- CO = College Accelerator Programme entrant
- NG = Next Gen Accelerator Program entrant
- w/o = Walkover
- r = Retired
- d = Defaulted

=== Draw ===
First round
1	(Czech Republic) B Krejčíková (Czech Republic) K Siniaková	^{w/o}
Alt	(Germany) A-L Friedsam (United States) V Lepchenko
(Russia) N Dzalamidze (Belarus) L Marozava	6	4	[5]
(Germany) N Geuer (France) E Lechemia	1	6	[10]
4	(Russia) A Blinkova (Japan) M Ninomiya	6	5	[10]
(Russia) M Gasparyan (Georgia (country)) O Kalashnikova	0	7	[7]
(Slovakia) V Kužmová (Russia) Y Sizikova	6	6
(Slovenia) D Jakupović (United States) S Santamaria	4	3
(United States) K Christian (Chile) A Guarachi	2	3
WC	(United States) C Gauff (United States) C McNally	6	6
(France) F Ferro (Switzerland) J Teichmann	2	1
3	(Germany) L Siegemund (Slovenia) K Srebotnik	6	6
WC	(Austria) B Haas (Switzerland) X Knoll	1	6	[10]
(United States) H Carter (Brazil) L Stefani	6	0	[7]
(Canada) S Fichman (United States) M Sanchez	2	6	[4]
2	(Poland) A Rosolska (Czech Republic) R Voráčová	6	4	[10]

Quarterfinals
1	(Czech Republic) B Krejčíková (Czech Republic) K Siniaková	7^{7}	4	[10]
(Germany) N Geuer (France) E Lechemia	6^{3}	6	[4]
4	(Russia) A Blinkova (Japan) M Ninomiya	4	6	[10]
(Slovakia) V Kužmová (Russia) Y Sizikova	6	3	[12]
WC	(United States) C Gauff (United States) C McNally	7^{7}	6
3	(Germany) L Siegemund (Slovenia) K Srebotnik	6^{4}	4
WC	(Austria) B Haas (Switzerland) X Knoll	7	7^{7}
2	(Poland) A Rosolska (Czech Republic) R Voráčová	5	6^{3}

Semifinals
1	(Czech Republic) B Krejčíková (Czech Republic) K Siniaková	6	6
(Slovakia) V Kužmová (Russia) Y Sizikova	2	4
WC	(United States) C Gauff (United States) C McNally	6^{5}	6	[9]
WC	(Austria) B Haas (Switzerland) X Knoll	7^{7}	1	[11]

Final
1	(Czech Republic) B Krejčíková (Czech Republic) K Siniaková	6	6
WC	(Austria) B Haas (Switzerland) X Knoll	4	3
