= 2020 Top Seed Open =

Women's tennis tournament

- Date: August 10–16
- Surface: Hard / Outdoor
- Location: Lexington, United States
- Venue: Top Seed Tennis Club

Champions

Singles
- (United States) Jennifer Brady

Doubles
- (United States) Hayley Carter / (Brazil) Luisa Stefani
- Top Seed Open

The 2020 Top Seed Open was a professional women's tennis tournament that was played on outdoor hard courts at the Top Seed Tennis Club in Nicholasville, near Lexington, Kentucky. It was a WTA International-class tournament on the 2020 WTA Tour, and was the first American tournament of the Tour to be played since its suspension due to the COVID-19 pandemic.

The event was announced in early-July 2020 as one of two substitute events (alongside the 2020 Prague Open) for the Washington Open, whose organizers had declined to host the WTA Tour this season (the event was ultimately canceled later that month, citing the pandemic) in lieu of the regular US Open Series.

== Points and prize money ==
=== Point distribution ===
| Event | W | F | SF | QF | Round of 16 | Round of 32 | Q | Q2 | Q1 |
| Singles | 280 | 180 | 110 | 60 | 30 | 1 | 18 | 12 | 1 |
| Doubles | 280 | 180 | 110 | 60 | 1 | —N/a | —N/a | —N/a | —N/a |

=== Prize money ===
| Event | W | F | SF | QF | Round of 16 | Round of 32 | Q2 | Q1 |
| Singles | $25,000 | $14,000 | $8,700 | $5,000 | $3,150 | $2,300 | $1,685 | $1,100 |
| Doubles* | $9,000 | $5,040 | $3,230 | $1,980 | $1,520 | —N/a | —N/a | —N/a |

_{*per team}

== Singles main draw entrants ==
=== Seeds ===
| Country | Player | Rank^{1} | Seed |
|---|---|---|---|
| USA | Serena Williams | 9 | 1 |
| BLR | Aryna Sabalenka | 11 | 2 |
| GBR | Johanna Konta | 14 | 3 |
| USA | ~~Amanda Anisimova~~ | 28 | 4 |
| KAZ | Yulia Putintseva | 33 | 5 |
| POL | Magda Linette | 36 | 6 |
| USA | Sloane Stephens | 37 | 7 |
| TUN | Ons Jabeur | 39 | 8 |

- Rankings are as of March 16, 2020

=== Other entrants ===
The following players received wildcards into the singles main draw:

- (United States) Caty McNally
- (United States) Shelby Rogers
- (Russia) Vera Zvonareva

The following player received entry using a protected ranking into the main draw:

- (United States) Catherine Bellis

The following players received entry from the qualifying draw:

- (United States) Kristie Ahn
- (United States) Caroline Dolehide
- (Canada) Leylah Annie Fernandez
- (Belarus) Olga Govortsova
- (Russia) Anna Kalinskaya
- (United States) Bethanie Mattek-Sands

The following player received entry as a lucky loser:

- (United States) Francesca Di Lorenzo

=== Withdrawals ===
Before the tournament

- (Kazakhstan) Zarina Diyas → replaced by (Japan) Misaki Doi
- (Spain) Garbiñe Muguruza → replaced by (United States) Venus Williams
- (United States) Amanda Anisimova → replaced by (United States) Francesca Di Lorenzo

== Doubles main draw entrants ==
=== Seeds ===
| Country | Player | Country | Player | Rank^{1} | Seed |
|---|---|---|---|---|---|
| CHI | Alexa Guarachi | USA | Desirae Krawczyk | 76 | 1 |
| USA | Jennifer Brady | BLR | Aryna Sabalenka | 77 | 2 |
| USA | Coco Gauff | USA | Caty McNally | 89 | 3 |
| USA | Hayley Carter | BRA | Luisa Stefani | 90 | 4 |

- ^{1} Rankings are as of March 16, 2020

=== Other entrants ===
The following pairs received wildcards into the doubles main draw:

- (United States) Bethanie Mattek-Sands / (United States) Sloane Stephens
- (Romania) Gabriela Talabă / (United States) Caitlin Whoriskey

== Champions ==
=== Singles ===
- (United States) Jennifer Brady def. (Switzerland) Jil Teichmann, 6–3, 6–4

=== Doubles ===
- (United States) Hayley Carter / (Brazil) Luisa Stefani def. (Czech Republic) Marie Bouzková / (Switzerland) Jil Teichmann, 6–1, 7–5
