= 2020 WTA Lyon Open =

Women's tennis tournament in Lyon, France

2020 Lyon Open (WTA)
- Date: 2 - 8 March
- Edition: 1st
- Category: WTA International tournaments
- Draw: 32S / 16D
- Prize money: $250,000
- Surface: Hard - Indoors
- Location: Lyon, France
- Venue: Palais des Sports de Gerland

Champions

Singles
- (United States) Sofia Kenin

Doubles
- (Romania) Laura Ioana Paar / (Germany) Julia Wachaczyk
- Lyon Open (WTA)

The 2020 Lyon Open (WTA) (also known as the Open 6ème Sens — Métropole de Lyon for sponsorship reasons) was a women's tennis tournament played on indoor hard courts. It was the first edition of the Lyon Open (WTA) and an International tournament on the 2020 WTA Tour. It took place at the Palais des Sports de Gerland in Lyon, France, from 2 to 8 March 2020.

== Singles main draw entrants ==
=== Seeds ===
Country	Player	Ranking^{1}	Seed
USA	Sofia Kenin	5	1
FRA	Kristina Mladenovic	39	2
FRA	Caroline Garcia	47	3
FRA	Alizé Cornet	58	4
BEL	Alison Van Uytvanck	62	5
SUI	Jil Teichmann	66	6
RUS	Daria Kasatkina	73	7
SVK	Viktória Kužmová	85	8

- ^{1} Rankings as of 24 February 2020.

=== Other entrants ===
The following players received wildcards into the main draw:

- (France) Clara Burel
- (Russia) Daria Kasatkina
- (France) Chloé Paquet

The following player received entry into the singles main draw using a protected ranking:

- (Belarus) Vera Lapko

The following players received entry from the qualifying draw:

- (Romania) Irina Bara
- (Romania) Jaqueline Cristian
- (Poland) Magdalena Fręch
- (Russia) Anastasiya Komardina
- (Ukraine) Marta Kostyuk
- (Germany) Antonia Lottner

The following player received entry as a lucky loser:

- (Netherlands) Lesley Pattinama Kerkhove

=== Withdrawals ===
Before the tournament

- (Russia) Ekaterina Alexandrova → replaced by (Germany) Anna-Lena Friedsam
- (Spain) Paula Badosa → replaced by (Netherlands) Lesley Pattinama Kerkhove
- (Russia) Margarita Gasparyan → replaced by (France) Pauline Parmentier
- (Czech Republic) Barbora Krejčíková → replaced by (Luxembourg) Mandy Minella
- (Russia) Anastasia Pavlyuchenkova → replaced by (Bulgaria) Viktoriya Tomova
- (Czech Republic) Kristýna Plíšková → replaced by (Czech Republic) Tereza Martincová

During the tournament

- (Switzerland) Jil Teichmann (right ankle injury)

== Doubles main draw entrants ==
=== Seeds ===
Country	Player	Country	Player	Rank^{1}	Seed
GER	Anna-Lena Friedsam	LUX	Mandy Minella	141	1
SRB	Aleksandra Krunić	SLO	Katarina Srebotnik	143	2
GEO	Oksana Kalashnikova	RUS	Valeria Savinykh	181	3
ROU	Andreea Mitu	ROU	Raluca Olaru	211	4

- Rankings as of February 24, 2020.

=== Other entrants ===
The following pairs received wildcards into the doubles main draw:

- (France) Estelle Cascino / (France) Elsa Jacquemot
- (France) Chloé Paquet / (France) Pauline Parmentier

== Champions ==
=== Singles ===
- (United States) Sofia Kenin def. (Germany) Anna-Lena Friedsam, 6–2, 4–6, 6–4

=== Doubles ===
- (Romania) Laura Ioana Paar / (Germany) Julia Wachaczyk def. (Netherlands) Lesley Pattinama Kerkhove / (Netherlands) Bibiane Schoofs, 7–5, 6–4
