= 2020 WTA Lyon Open – Singles =

Singles
- 2020 WTA Lyon Open

Final
- Champion: (United States) Sofia Kenin
- Runner-up: (Germany) Anna-Lena Friedsam
- Score: 6–2, 4–6, 6–4

Details
- Draw: 32 (6 Q / 3 WC )
- Seeds: 8

Events
| Singles | Doubles |
- WTA Lyon Open

This was the first edition of the event.

Sofia Kenin won the title, defeating Anna-Lena Friedsam in the final, 6–2, 4–6, 6–4. Kenin won the title after saving a match point Jaqueline Cristian had against her in the second round.

== Seeds ==
1. (United States) Sofia Kenin (champion)
2. (France) Kristina Mladenovic (second round)
3. (France) Caroline Garcia (quarterfinals)
4. (France) Alizé Cornet (second round)
5. (Belgium) Alison Van Uytvanck (semifinals)
6. (Switzerland) Jil Teichmann (second round, withdrew)
7. (Russia) Daria Kasatkina (semifinals)
8. (Slovakia) Viktória Kužmová (quarterfinals)

== Draw ==
Key

- Q = Qualifier
- WC = Wild card
- LL = Lucky loser
- Alt = Alternate
- ITF = ITF entry
- PR = Protected ranking
- SR = Special ranking
- SE = Special exempt
- JE = Junior exempt
- JR = Junior Accelerator Programme entrant
- CO = College Accelerator Programme entrant
- NG = Next Gen Accelerator Program entrant
- w/o = Walkover
- r = Retired
- d = Defaulted

=== Finals ===
Semifinals
1 | (United States) Sofia Kenin | 7^{7} | 6^{2} | 7^{7}
5 | (Belgium) Alison Van Uytvanck | 6^{5} | 7^{7} | 6^{2}
7/WC | (Russia) Daria Kasatkina | 3 | 6 | 2
(Germany) Anna-Lena Friedsam | 6 | 3 | 6

Final
1 | (United States) Sofia Kenin | 6 | 4 | 6
(Germany) Anna-Lena Friedsam | 2 | 6 | 4

=== Top half ===
First round
1 | (United States) S Kenin | 6 | 6
(Russia) V Diatchenko | 4 | 3
(Australia) P Hon | 2 | 0
Q | (Romania) J Cristian | 6 | 6
(Luxembourg) M Minella | 4 | 4
(France) O Dodin | 6 | 6
WC | (France) C Burel | 4 | 3
6 | (Switzerland) J Teichmann | 6 | 6
3 | (France) C Garcia | 6 | 1 | 7^{7}
(Belgium) G Minnen | 4 | 6 | 6^{5}
Q | (Ukraine) M Kostyuk | 4 | 4
(Belgium) Y Bonaventure | 6 | 6
(Bulgaria) V Tomova | 7 | 6^{5} | 6
Q | (Poland) M Fręch | 5 | 7^{7} | 4
(Poland) K Kawa | 1 | 3
5 | (Belgium) A Van Uytvanck | 6 | 6

Second round
1 | (United States) S Kenin | 6^{5} | 7 | 6
Q | (Romania) J Cristian | 7^{7} | 5 | 4
(France) O Dodin | w/o
6 | (Switzerland) J Teichmann
3 | (France) C Garcia | 7 | 6
(Belgium) Y Bonaventure | 5 | 2
(Bulgaria) V Tomova | 6 | 4 | 6^{2}
5 | (Belgium) A Van Uytvanck | 3 | 6 | 7^{7}

Quarterfinals
1 | (United States) S Kenin | 6 | 6^{5} | 6
(France) O Dodin | 1 | 7^{7} | 2
3 | (France) C Garcia | 2 | 2
5 | (Belgium) A Van Uytvanck | 6 | 6

Semifinals
1 | (United States) S Kenin | 7^{7} | 6^{2} | 7^{7}
5 | (Belgium) A Van Uytvanck | 6^{5} | 7^{7} | 6^{2}

=== Bottom half ===
First round
7/WC | (Russia) D Kasatkina | 6 | 5 | 6
(France) P Parmentier | 2 | 7 | 4
(Hungary) T Babos | 3 | 7^{7} | 4
Q | (Romania) I Bara | 6 | 6^{2} | 6
PR | (Belarus) V Lapko | 3 | 4
(Italy) C Giorgi | 6 | 6
Q | (Germany) A Lottner | 5 | 0
4 | (France) A Cornet | 7 | 6
8 | (Slovakia) V Kužmová | 6 | 2 | 6
LL | (Netherlands) L Pattinama Kerkhove | 2 | 6 | 2
(Romania) A Bogdan | 3 | 6 | 3
(Czech Republic) T Martincová | 6 | 4 | 6
(Germany) A-L Friedsam | 6 | 6
Q | (Russia) A Komardina | 2 | 2
WC | (France) C Paquet | 6 | 2 | 4
2 | (France) K Mladenovic | 1 | 6 | 6

Second round
7/WC | (Russia) D Kasatkina | 6 | 6
Q | (Romania) I Bara | 3 | 2
(Italy) C Giorgi | 4 | 7^{7} | 6
4 | (France) A Cornet | 6 | 6^{5} | 2
8 | (Slovakia) V Kužmová | 6 | 4 | 6
(Czech Republic) T Martincová | 4 | 6 | 4
(Germany) A-L Friedsam | 6 | 6
2 | (France) K Mladenovic | 3 | 3

Quarterfinals
7/WC | (Russia) D Kasatkina | 6 | 4 | 6
(Italy) C Giorgi | 2 | 6 | 2
8 | (Slovakia) V Kužmová | 6 | 6^{4} | 2
(Germany) A-L Friedsam | 3 | 7^{7} | 6

Semifinals
7/WC | (Russia) D Kasatkina | 3 | 6 | 2
(Germany) A-L Friedsam | 6 | 3 | 6

== Qualifying ==
=== Seeds ===
1. (Germany) Tamara Korpatsch (first round)
2. (Ukraine) Marta Kostyuk (qualified)
3. (Germany) Antonia Lottner (qualified)
4. (Netherlands) Lesley Pattinama Kerkhove (qualifying competition, lucky loser)
5. (Romania) Irina Bara (qualified)
6. (Slovakia) Jana Čepelová (first round)
7. (Spain) Cristina Bucșa (qualifying competition)
8. (Romania) Jaqueline Cristian (qualified)
9. (Poland) Magdalena Fręch (qualified)
10. (China) Lu Jiajing (qualifying competition)
11. (Bulgaria) Isabella Shinikova (qualifying competition)
12. (Serbia) Natalija Kostić (first round)

=== Qualifiers ===
1. (Romania) Jaqueline Cristian
2. (Ukraine) Marta Kostyuk
3. (Germany) Antonia Lottner
4. (Russia) Anastasiya Komardina
5. (Romania) Irina Bara
6. (Poland) Magdalena Fręch

=== Lucky loser ===
1. (Netherlands) Lesley Pattinama Kerkhove

=== Qualifying draw ===
==== First qualifier ====
First round
1 | (Germany) Tamara Korpatsch | 1 | 6 | 2
(Belgium) Lara Salden | 6 | 2 | 6
(Spain) Nuria Párrizas Díaz | 5 | 0
8 | (Romania) Jaqueline Cristian | 7 | 6

Qualifying competition
(Belgium) Lara Salden | 3 | 0
8 | (Romania) Jaqueline Cristian | 6 | 6

==== Second qualifier ====
First round
2 | (Ukraine) Marta Kostyuk | 6 | 4 | 6
(Italy) Martina Di Giuseppe | 1 | 6 | 1
(Bulgaria) Elitsa Kostova | 1 | 3
10 | (China) Lu Jiajing | 6 | 6

Qualifying competition
2 | (Ukraine) Marta Kostyuk | 6 | 3 | 6
10 | (China) Lu Jiajing | 1 | 6 | 1

==== Third qualifier ====
First round
3 | (Germany) Antonia Lottner | 6 | 6
WC | (France) Lou Brouleau | 3 | 2
(Sweden) Mirjam Björklund | 4 | 2
7 | (Spain) Cristina Bucșa | 6 | 6

Qualifying competition
3 | (Germany) Antonia Lottner | 2 | 6 | 7^{7}
7 | (Spain) Cristina Bucșa | 6 | 3 | 6^{4}

==== Fourth qualifier ====
First round
4 | (Netherlands) Lesley Pattinama Kerkhove | 6^{6} | 7^{7} | 7
WC | (France) Elsa Jacquemot | 7^{8} | 6^{3} | 5
(Russia) Anastasiya Komardina | 6 | 5 | 7
12 | (Serbia) Natalija Kostić | 2 | 7 | 5

Qualifying competition
4 | (Netherlands) Lesley Pattinama Kerkhove | 2 | 3
(Russia) Anastasiya Komardina | 6 | 6

==== Fifth qualifier ====
First round
5 | (Romania) Irina Bara | 7 | 6
WC | (France) Audrey Albié | 5 | 0
(Latvia) Diāna Marcinkēviča | 3 | 4
11 | (Bulgaria) Isabella Shinikova | 6 | 6

Qualifying competition
5 | (Romania) Irina Bara | 7^{7} | 6
11 | (Bulgaria) Isabella Shinikova | 6^{5} | 3

==== Sixth qualifier ====
First round
6 | (Slovakia) Jana Čepelová | 6^{4} | 1
WC | (France) Margot Yerolymos | 7^{7} | 6
(Russia) Valeria Savinykh | 1 | 2
9 | (Poland) Magdalena Fręch | 6 | 6

Qualifying competition
WC | (France) Margot Yerolymos | 6 | 1 | 6^{0}
9 | (Poland) Magdalena Fręch | 4 | 6 | 7^{7}
