= 2020 Upper Austria Ladies Linz – Doubles =

Doubles
- 2020 Upper Austria Ladies Linz

Final
- Champions: (Netherlands) Arantxa Rus (Slovenia) Tamara Zidanšek
- Runners-up: (Czech Republic) Lucie Hradecká (Czech Republic) Kateřina Siniaková
- Score: 6–3, 6–4

Details
- Draw: 16
- Seeds: 4

Events
Singles	Doubles
← 2019 ·	Linz Open	· 2021 →

Barbora Krejčíková and Kateřina Siniaková were the defending champions, but Krejčíková chose not to participate in the doubles event at this tournament.

Arantxa Rus and Tamara Zidanšek won the title, defeating Siniaková and Lucie Hradecká in the final, 6–3, 6–4.

== Seeds ==
1. (Czech Republic) Lucie Hradecká / (Czech Republic) Kateřina Siniaková (final)
2. (Canada) Gabriela Dabrowski / (Russia) Vera Zvonareva (semifinals)
3. (Romania) Irina Bara / (Spain) Sara Sorribes Tormo (semifinals)
4. (Netherlands) Arantxa Rus / (Slovenia) Tamara Zidanšek (champions)

== Draw ==
=== Key ===
- Q = Qualifier
- WC = Wild card
- LL = Lucky loser
- Alt = Alternate
- ITF = ITF entry
- PR = Protected ranking
- SR = Special ranking
- SE = Special exempt
- JE = Junior exempt
- JR = Junior Accelerator Programme entrant
- CO = College Accelerator Programme entrant
- NG = Next Gen Accelerator Program entrant
- w/o = Walkover
- r = Retired
- d = Defaulted

=== Draw ===
First round
1	(Czech Republic) L Hradecká (Czech Republic) K Siniaková	6	6
(Russia) N Dzalamidze (United Kingdom) E Silva	1	3
(Romania) I-C Begu (Argentina) N Podoroska	6	6
(Kazakhstan) A Danilina (France) E Lechemia	4	4
3	(Romania) I Bara (Spain) S Sorribes Tormo	w/o
(Ukraine) M Kostyuk (Ukraine) D Yastremska
(Switzerland) J Teichmann (Czech Republic) R Voráčová	6	0
(Austria) B Haas (Switzerland) X Knoll	0	0^{r}
WC	(United Kingdom) J Burrage (Germany) S Lisicki	6^{r}
(Norway) U Eikeri (Russia) Y Sizikova	5
(Romania) LI Paar (Germany) J Wachaczyk	4	2
4	(Netherlands) A Rus (Slovenia) T Zidanšek	6	6
(Belgium) G Minnen (Netherlands) R van der Hoek	6	6
(Hungary) RL Jani (United Kingdom) E Webley-Smith	2	0
WC	(Austria) M Antonitsch (Austria) J Grabher	3	2
2	(Canada) G Dabrowski (Russia) V Zvonareva	6	6

Quarterfinals
1	(Czech Republic) L Hradecká (Czech Republic) K Siniaková	6	7
(Romania) I-C Begu (Argentina) N Podoroska	1	5
3	(Romania) I Bara (Spain) S Sorribes Tormo	6	7^{9}
(Switzerland) J Teichmann (Czech Republic) R Voráčová	3	6^{7}
(Norway) U Eikeri (Russia) Y Sizikova	3	0
4	(Netherlands) A Rus (Slovenia) T Zidanšek	6	6
(Belgium) G Minnen (Netherlands) R van der Hoek	1	2
2	(Canada) G Dabrowski (Russia) V Zvonareva	6	6

Semifinals
1	(Czech Republic) L Hradecká (Czech Republic) K Siniaková	6	3	[10]
3	(Romania) I Bara (Spain) S Sorribes Tormo	3	6	[5]
4	(Netherlands) A Rus (Slovenia) T Zidanšek	7^{9}	4	[10]
2	(Canada) G Dabrowski (Russia) V Zvonareva	6^{7}	6	[6]

Final
1	(Czech Republic) L Hradecká (Czech Republic) K Siniaková	3	4
4	(Netherlands) A Rus (Slovenia) T Zidanšek	6	6
