= 2019 Upper Austria Ladies Linz =

- Date: 7–13 October
- Edition: 33rd
- Category: WTA International
- Draw: 32S / 16D
- Prize money: $250,000
- Surface: Hard (indoor)
- Location: Linz, Austria
- Venue: TipsArena Linz

Champions

Singles
- (United States) Coco Gauff

Doubles
- (Czech Republic) Barbora Krejčiková / (Czech Republic) Kateřina Siniaková
- Linz Open

The 2019 Upper Austria Ladies Linz was a women's tennis tournament played on indoor hard courts. It was the 33rd edition of the Linz Open, and part of the WTA International tournaments-category of the 2019 WTA Tour. It was held at the TipsArena Linz in Linz, Austria, from 7 to 13 October 2019. Unseeded Coco Gauff, who entered the main draw as a lucky loser, won the singles title.

== Finals ==
=== Singles ===
- (United States) Coco Gauff defeated (Latvia) Jeļena Ostapenko, 6–3, 1–6, 6–2

=== Doubles ===
- (Czech Republic) Barbora Krejčíková / (Czech Republic) Kateřina Siniaková defeated (Austria) Barbara Haas / (Switzerland) Xenia Knoll, 6–4, 6–3

== Points and prize money ==
=== Point distribution ===
Event	W	F	SF	QF	Round of 16	Round of 32	Q	Q2	Q1
Singles	280	180	110	60	30	1	18	12	1
Doubles	280	180	110	60	1	—N/a	—N/a	—N/a	—N/a

=== Prize money ===
Event	W	F	SF	QF	Round of 16	Round of 32^{1}	Q2	Q1
Singles	$43,000	$21,400	$11,500	$6,200	$3,420	$2,220	$1,285	$750
Doubles *	$12,300	$6,400	$3,435	$1,820	$960	—N/a	—N/a	—N/a

_{^{1} Qualifiers prize money is also the Round of 32 prize money}
_{* per team}

== Singles entrants ==
=== Seeds ===
Country	Player	Rank^{1}	Seed
NED	Kiki Bertens	8	1
SUI	Belinda Bencic	10	2
~~LAT~~	~~Anastasija Sevastova~~	~~18~~	~~3~~
CRO	Donna Vekić	22	4
GER	Julia Görges	27	5
~~GRE~~	~~Maria Sakkari~~	~~30~~	~~6~~
CZE	Barbora Strýcová	34	7
RUS	Ekaterina Alexandrova	38	8
RUS	Anastasia Pavlyuchenkova	40	9

- Rankings as of September 30, 2019

=== Other entrants ===
The following players received wildcards into the singles main draw:

- (Netherlands) Kiki Bertens
- (Austria) Julia Grabher
- (Austria) Barbara Haas

The following players received entry from the qualifying draw:

- (Japan) Misaki Doi
- (Germany) Anna-Lena Friedsam
- (Germany) Tamara Korpatsch
- (Germany) Laura Siegemund
- (Serbia) Nina Stojanović
- (Switzerland) Stefanie Vögele

The following players received entry as lucky losers:

- (Belgium) Ysaline Bonaventure
- (United States) Coco Gauff

=== Withdrawals ===
Before the tournament

- (United States) Danielle Collins → replaced by (Russia) Anna Blinkova
- (Italy) Camila Giorgi → replaced by (Latvia) Jeļena Ostapenko
- (Czech Republic) Petra Kvitová → replaced by (Germany) Andrea Petkovic
- (United States) Jessica Pegula → replaced by (Kazakhstan) Elena Rybakina
- (Greece) Maria Sakkari → replaced by (United States) Coco Gauff
- (Latvia) Anastasija Sevastova → replaced by (Belgium) Ysaline Bonaventure
- (Czech Republic) Markéta Vondroušová → replaced by (Belgium) Alison Van Uytvanck

=== Retirements ===
- (France) Alizé Cornet (right hip injury)
- (Ukraine) Kateryna Kozlova (left lower leg injury)

== Doubles entrants ==
=== Seeds ===
Country	Player	Country	Player	Rank^{1}	Seed
CZE	Barbora Krejčíková	CZE	Kateřina Siniaková	17	1
POL	Alicja Rosolska	CZE	Renata Voráčová	87	2
GER	Laura Siegemund	SLO	Katarina Srebotnik	103	3
RUS	Anna Blinkova	JPN	Makoto Ninomiya	116	4

- ^{1} Rankings as of September 30, 2019

=== Other entrants ===
The following pairs received wildcards into the doubles main draw:

- (United States) Coco Gauff / (United States) Caty McNally
- (Austria) Barbara Haas / (Switzerland) Xenia Knoll

The following pair received entry as alternates:

- ~~(Germany) Anna-Lena Friedsam / (United States) Varvara Lepchenko~~

=== Withdrawals ===
Before the tournament

- (Belgium) Kirsten Flipkens (left wrist injury)
- (Germany) Anna-Lena Friedsam (right shoulder injury)
