= 2020 WTA Lyon Open – Doubles =

Doubles
- 2020 WTA Lyon Open

Final
- Champions: (Romania) Laura Ioana Paar (Germany) Julia Wachaczyk
- Runners-up: (Netherlands) Lesley Pattinama Kerkhove (Netherlands) Bibiane Schoofs
- Score: 7–5, 6–4

Details
- Draw: 16 (2 WC )
- Seeds: 4

Events
Singles	Doubles
- WTA Lyon Open

This was the first edition of the event.

Laura Ioana Paar and Julia Wachaczyk won their first WTA titles, defeating Lesley Pattinama Kerkhove and Bibiane Schoofs in the final, 7–5, 6–4.

== Seeds ==
1. (Germany) Anna-Lena Friedsam / (Luxembourg) Mandy Minella (first round)
2. (Serbia) Aleksandra Krunić / (Slovenia) Katarina Srebotnik (quarterfinals)
3. (Georgia (country)) Oksana Kalashnikova / (Russia) Valeria Savinykh (first round)
4. (Romania) Andreea Mitu / (Romania) Raluca Olaru (quarterfinals)

== Draw ==
Key

- Q = Qualifier
- WC = Wild card
- LL = Lucky loser
- Alt = Alternate
- ITF = ITF entry
- PR = Protected ranking
- SR = Special ranking
- SE = Special exempt
- JE = Junior exempt
- JR = Junior Accelerator Programme entrant
- CO = College Accelerator Programme entrant
- NG = Next Gen Accelerator Program entrant
- w/o = Walkover
- r = Retired
- d = Defaulted

=== Draw ===
First round
1	(Germany) A-L Friedsam (Luxembourg) M Minella	4	6	[6]
(Romania) LI Paar (Germany) J Wachaczyk	6	4	[10]
(France) E Lechemia (France) J Ponchet	6	6
WC	(France) C Paquet (France) P Parmentier	3	4
4	(Romania) A Mitu (Romania) R Olaru	2	6	[10]
WC	(France) E Cascino (France) E Jacquemot	6	4	[4]
(Russia) V Diatchenko (Russia) N Dzalamidze	6	7
(Spain) C Bucșa (Germany) V Heisen	0	5
PR	(Belarus) V Lapko (Belarus) L Marozava	6	7^{7}
(Brazil) L Pigossi (Netherlands) R van der Hoek	2	6^{0}
(Ukraine) M Kostyuk (Slovakia) V Kužmová	6	6
3	(Georgia (country)) O Kalashnikova (Russia) V Savinykh	2	1
(Belgium) G Minnen (Belgium) A Van Uytvanck	6^{4}	4
(Netherlands) L Pattinama Kerkhove (Netherlands) B Schoofs	7^{7}	6
(United Kingdom) SB Grey (United Kingdom) E Silva	2	1
2	(Serbia) A Krunić (Slovenia) K Srebotnik	6	6

Quarterfinals
(Romania) LI Paar (Germany) J Wachaczyk	6	4	[10]
(France) E Lechemia (France) J Ponchet	2	6	[6]
4	(Romania) A Mitu (Romania) R Olaru	6	5	[7]
(Russia) V Diatchenko (Russia) N Dzalamidze	3	7	[10]
PR	(Belarus) V Lapko (Belarus) L Marozava	2	4
(Ukraine) M Kostyuk (Slovakia) V Kužmová	6	6
(Netherlands) L Pattinama Kerkhove (Netherlands) B Schoofs	6	6
2	(Serbia) A Krunić (Slovenia) K Srebotnik	2	2

Semifinals
(Romania) LI Paar (Germany) J Wachaczyk	6	6
(Russia) V Diatchenko (Russia) N Dzalamidze	3	1
(Ukraine) M Kostyuk (Slovakia) V Kužmová	6	2	[3]
(Netherlands) L Pattinama Kerkhove (Netherlands) B Schoofs	0	6	[10]

Final
(Romania) LI Paar (Germany) J Wachaczyk	7	6
(Netherlands) L Pattinama Kerkhove (Netherlands) B Schoofs	5	4
