= 2020 St. Petersburg Ladies' Trophy – Doubles =

Doubles
- 2020 St. Petersburg Ladies' Trophy

Final
- Champions: (Japan) Shuko Aoyama (Japan) Ena Shibahara
- Runners-up: (United States) Kaitlyn Christian (Chile) Alexa Guarachi
- Score: 4–6, 6–0, [10–3]

Events
Singles	Doubles
← 2019 ·	St. Petersburg Ladies' Trophy	· 2021 →

Margarita Gasparyan and Ekaterina Makarova were the defending champions, but Gasparyan chose not to defend her title. Makarova retired from professional tennis in January 2020.

Shuko Aoyama and Ena Shibahara won the title, defeating Kaitlyn Christian and Alexa Guarachi in the final, 4–6, 6–0, [10–3].

== Seeds ==
1. (Japan) Shuko Aoyama / (Japan) Ena Shibahara (champions)
2. (Ukraine) Lyudmyla Kichenok / (Ukraine) Nadiia Kichenok (first round)
3. (United States) Kaitlyn Christian / (Chile) Alexa Guarachi (final)
4. (United States) Hayley Carter / (Canada) Sharon Fichman (semifinals)

== Draw ==
=== Key ===
- Q = Qualifier
- WC = Wild card
- LL = Lucky loser
- Alt = Alternate
- SE = Special exempt
- PR = Protected ranking
- ITF = ITF entry
- JE = Junior exempt
- w/o = Walkover
- r = Retired
- d = Defaulted
- SR = Special ranking

=== Draw ===
First round
1	(Japan) S Aoyama (Japan) E Shibahara	4	6	[10]
(Croatia) D Jurak (Belarus) L Marozava	6	1	[5]
(Poland) A Rosolska (Australia) A Tomljanović	6^{4}	6	[3]
(Russia) A Potapova (Kazakhstan) Y Putintseva	7^{7}	4	[10]
4	(United States) H Carter (Canada) S Fichman	6	6
(Russia) E Alexandrova (Russia) V Zvonareva	2	1
(Australia) M Adamczak (Russia) Y Sizikova	6	6
(Russia) V Diatchenko (Russia) N Dzalamidze	4	2
PR	(Russia) A Kudryavtseva (Slovenia) K Srebotnik	6	2	[10]
(Georgia (country)) O Kalashnikova (Romania) A Mitu	3	6	[6]
WC	(Russia) D Mishina (Russia) E Shalimova	2	2
3	(United States) K Christian (Chile) A Guarachi	6	6
(France) C Garcia (United Kingdom) J Konta	6	3	[10]
(Germany) V Heisen (Ukraine) V Strakhova	3	6	[5]
(Sweden) C Lister (Czech Republic) R Voráčová	6	7
2	(Ukraine) L Kichenok (Ukraine) N Kichenok	4	5

Quarterfinals
1	(Japan) S Aoyama (Japan) E Shibahara	6	6
(Russia) A Potapova (Kazakhstan) Y Putintseva	1	2
4	(United States) H Carter (Canada) S Fichman	6	6
(Australia) M Adamczak (Russia) Y Sizikova	3	3
PR	(Russia) A Kudryavtseva (Slovenia) K Srebotnik	3	5
3	(United States) K Christian (Chile) A Guarachi	6	7
(France) C Garcia (United Kingdom) J Konta	6	6
(Sweden) C Lister (Czech Republic) R Voráčová	2	2

Semifinals
1	(Japan) S Aoyama (Japan) E Shibahara	6	6
4	(United States) H Carter (Canada) S Fichman	2	3
3	(United States) K Christian (Chile) A Guarachi	6	7
(France) C Garcia (United Kingdom) J Konta	4	5

Final
1	(Japan) S Aoyama (Japan) E Shibahara	4	6	[10]
3	(United States) K Christian (Chile) A Guarachi	6	0	[3]
