= 2020 Top Seed Open – Doubles =

Doubles
- 2020 Top Seed Open

Final
- Champions: (United States) Hayley Carter (Brazil) Luisa Stefani
- Runners-up: (Czech Republic) Marie Bouzková (Switzerland) Jil Teichmann
- Score: 6–1, 7–5

Events
Singles	Doubles
- Lexington Challenger

Robin Anderson and Jessika Ponchet were the defending champions when the event was held as an ITF W60 event in 2019, but Ponchet was unable to participate due to insufficient ranking. Anderson played alongside Erin Routliffe but lost in the first round to Kaitlyn Christian and Giuliana Olmos.

Hayley Carter and Luisa Stefani won the title, defeating Marie Bouzková and Jil Teichmann in the final, 6–1, 7–5.

== Seeds ==
1. (Chile) Alexa Guarachi / (United States) Desirae Krawczyk (semifinals)
2. (United States) Jennifer Brady / (Belarus) Aryna Sabalenka (first round)
3. (United States) Coco Gauff / (United States) Caty McNally (first round)
4. (United States) Hayley Carter / (Brazil) Luisa Stefani (champions)

== Draw ==
Key

- Q = Qualifier
- WC = Wild card
- LL = Lucky loser
- Alt = Alternate
- ITF = ITF entry
- PR = Protected ranking
- SR = Special ranking
- SE = Special exempt
- JE = Junior exempt
- JR = Junior Accelerator Programme entrant
- CO = College Accelerator Programme entrant
- NG = Next Gen Accelerator Program entrant
- w/o = Walkover
- r = Retired
- d = Defaulted

=== Draw ===
First round
1	(Chile) A Guarachi (United States) D Krawczyk	6	6
(Georgia (country)) O Kalashnikova (Russia) A Kudryavtseva	3	4
WC	(Romania) G Talabă (United States) C Whoriskey	4	4
(United States) J Loeb (United States) I Neel	6	6
3	(United States) C Gauff (United States) C McNally	6	4	[6]
(Czech Republic) M Bouzková (Switzerland) J Teichmann	4	6	[10]
(United States) K Christian (Mexico) G Olmos	6	6
(United States) R Anderson (New Zealand) E Routliffe	2	4
(United States) E Bektas (United Kingdom) T Moore	1	4
WC	(United States) B Mattek-Sands (United States) S Stephens	6	6
(United States) Q Gleason (United States) C Harrison	0	2
4	(United States) H Carter (Brazil) L Stefani	6	6
(United States) B Pera (Australia) Ar Rodionova	4	2
(Russia) A Blinkova (Russia) V Zvonareva	6	6
(Poland) M Linette (United States) J Pegula	6	4	[10]
2	(United States) J Brady (Belarus) A Sabalenka	4	6	[8]

Quarterfinals
1	(Chile) A Guarachi (United States) D Krawczyk	4	6	[10]
(United States) J Loeb (United States) I Neel	6	4	[4]
(Czech Republic) M Bouzková (Switzerland) J Teichmann	6	7
(United States) K Christian (Mexico) G Olmos	4	5
WC	(United States) B Mattek-Sands (United States) S Stephens	4	4
4	(United States) H Carter (Brazil) L Stefani	6	6
(Russia) A Blinkova (Russia) V Zvonareva	7^{8}	4	[11]
(Poland) M Linette (United States) J Pegula	6^{6}	6	[9]

Semifinals
1	(Chile) A Guarachi (United States) D Krawczyk	2	6	[4]
(Czech Republic) M Bouzková (Switzerland) J Teichmann	6	3	[10]
4	(United States) H Carter (Brazil) L Stefani	7	6
(Russia) A Blinkova (Russia) V Zvonareva	5	1

Final
(Czech Republic) M Bouzková (Switzerland) J Teichmann	1	5
4	(United States) H Carter (Brazil) L Stefani	6	7
