= 2020 St. Petersburg Ladies' Trophy – Singles =

Singles
- 2020 St. Petersburg Ladies' Trophy

Final
- Champion: (Netherlands) Kiki Bertens
- Runner-up: (Kazakhstan) Elena Rybakina
- Score: 6–1, 6–3

Details
- Draw: 28 (6 Q / 4 WC )
- Seeds: 8

Events
Singles	Doubles
- St. Petersburg Ladies' Trophy

Kiki Bertens was the defending champion and successfully defended her title, defeating Elena Rybakina in the final, 6–1, 6–3. This would be Bertens' final WTA Tour singles title before her retirement in July 2021.

== Seeds ==
1. (Switzerland) Belinda Bencic (quarterfinals)
2. (Netherlands) Kiki Bertens (champion)
3. (Czech Republic) Petra Kvitová (quarterfinals, withdrew)
4. (United Kingdom) Johanna Konta (second round)
5. (Czech Republic) Markéta Vondroušová (first round)
6. (Greece) Maria Sakkari (semifinals)
7. (Croatia) Donna Vekić (second round)
8. (Kazakhstan) Elena Rybakina (final)

== Draw ==
Key

- Q = Qualifier
- WC = Wild card
- LL = Lucky loser
- Alt = Alternate
- ITF = ITF entry
- PR = Protected ranking
- SR = Special ranking
- SE = Special exempt
- JE = Junior exempt
- JR = Junior Accelerator Programme entrant
- CO = College Accelerator Programme entrant
- NG = Next Gen Accelerator Program entrant
- w/o = Walkover
- r = Retired
- d = Defaulted

=== Finals ===
Semifinals
6	(Greece) Maria Sakkari	6	5	1
8	(Kazakhstan) Elena Rybakina	3	7	6
(Russia) Ekaterina Alexandrova	1	6	1
2	(Netherlands) Kiki Bertens	6	4	6

Final
8	(Kazakhstan) Elena Rybakina	1	3
2	(Netherlands) Kiki Bertens	6	6

=== Top half ===
First round
(United States) J Brady	3	1
WC	(Russia) S Kuznetsova	6	6
Q	(France) A Cornet	6	6
(Latvia) J Ostapenko	1	2
Q	(Russia) V Diatchenko	6	4	6^{3}
6	(Greece) M Sakkari	3	6	7^{7}
(Slovakia) V Kužmová	2	2
Q	(France) O Dodin	6	6
LL	(France) F Ferro	7	3	6
(France) C Garcia	5	6	3
(Czech Republic) K Siniaková	3	4
8	(Kazakhstan) E Rybakina	6	6

Second round
1/WC	(Switzerland) B Bencic	7^{7}	6
WC	(Russia) S Kuznetsova	6^{4}	4
Q	(France) A Cornet	2	4
6	(Greece) M Sakkari	6	6
4/WC	(United Kingdom) J Konta	3	4
Q	(France) O Dodin	6	6
LL	(France) F Ferro	3	4
8	(Kazakhstan) E Rybakina	6	6

Quarterfinals
1/WC	(Switzerland) B Bencic	6	4	3
6	(Greece) M Sakkari	2	6	6
Q	(France) O Dodin	7^{7}	5	2
8	(Kazakhstan) E Rybakina	6^{5}	7	6

Semifinals
6	(Greece) M Sakkari	6	5	1
8	(Kazakhstan) E Rybakina	3	7	6

=== Bottom half ===
First round
7	(Croatia) D Vekić	6	6
Q	(United States) K Ahn	4	1
WC	(Russia) D Kasatkina	4	6	4
(Russia) E Alexandrova	6	3	6
(Belgium) A Van Uytvanck	6	6
(France) K Mladenovic	4	1
5	(Czech Republic) M Vondroušová	6	3	4
(Australia) A Tomljanović	3	6	6
Q	(Russia) L Samsonova	2	4
Q	(Russia) A Potapova	6	6
(Russia) V Kudermetova	7^{7}	1	7
(Kazakhstan) Y Putintseva	6^{4}	6	5

Second round
7	(Croatia) D Vekić	1	5
(Russia) E Alexandrova	6	7
(Belgium) A Van Uytvanck	6^{1}	6	2
3	(Czech Republic) P Kvitová	7^{7}	1	6
(Australia) A Tomljanović	6^{2}	3
Q	(Russia) A Potapova	7^{7}	6
(Russia) V Kudermetova	1	2
2	(Netherlands) K Bertens	6	6

Quarterfinals
(Russia) E Alexandrova	w/o
3	(Czech Republic) P Kvitová
Q	(Russia) A Potapova	4	6^{3}
2	(Netherlands) K Bertens	6	7^{7}

Semifinals
(Russia) E Alexandrova	1	6	1
2	(Netherlands) K Bertens	6	4	6

== Qualifying ==
=== Seeds ===
1. (France) Fiona Ferro (qualifying competition, lucky loser)
2. (France) Alizé Cornet (qualified)
3. (Russia) Vitalia Diatchenko (qualified)
4. (United States) Kristie Ahn (qualified)
5. (Hungary) Tímea Babos (qualifying competition)
6. (Russia) Anastasia Potapova (qualified)
7. (Russia) Varvara Gracheva (first round)
8. (Russia) Margarita Gasparyan (first round)
9. (Russia) Liudmila Samsonova (qualified)
10. (Russia) Natalia Vikhlyantseva (qualifying competition)
11. (France) Pauline Parmentier (qualifying competition)
12. (Czech Republic) Tereza Martincová (qualifying competition)

=== Qualifiers ===
1. (France) Océane Dodin
2. (France) Alizé Cornet
3. (Russia) Vitalia Diatchenko
4. (United States) Kristie Ahn
5. (Russia) Liudmila Samsonova
6. (Russia) Anastasia Potapova

=== Lucky loser ===
1. (France) Fiona Ferro

=== Qualifying draw ===
==== First qualifier ====
First round
1	(France) Fiona Ferro	7	6
(Russia) Marina Melnikova	5	4
(France) Océane Dodin	6	6
7	(Russia) Varvara Gracheva	4	2

Qualifying competition
1	(France) Fiona Ferro	6^{7}	6^{5}
(France) Océane Dodin	7^{9}	7^{7}

==== Second qualifier ====
First round
2	(France) Alizé Cornet	6	6
(Russia) Valentina Ivakhnenko	2	1
(Russia) Vera Zvonareva	6	6
8	(Russia) Margarita Gasparyan	2	2

Qualifying competition
2	(France) Alizé Cornet	6	6
(Russia) Vera Zvonareva	3	4

==== Third qualifier ====
First round
3	(Russia) Vitalia Diatchenko	6^{8}	7	6
WC	(Russia) Daria Mishina	7^{10}	5	3
(Russia) Anastasiya Komardina	3	3
10	(Russia) Natalia Vikhlyantseva	6	6

Qualifying competition
3	(Russia) Vitalia Diatchenko	7^{7}	6
10	(Russia) Natalia Vikhlyantseva	6^{3}	4

==== Fourth qualifier ====
First round
4	(United States) Kristie Ahn	6	4	6
(Ukraine) Valeriya Strakhova	2	6	3
WC	(Russia) Polina Kudermetova	1	1
12	(Czech Republic) Tereza Martincová	6	6

Qualifying competition
4	(United States) Kristie Ahn	7^{7}	6
12	(Czech Republic) Tereza Martincová	6^{1}	4

==== Fifth qualifier ====
First round
5	(Hungary) Tímea Babos	3	6	7^{7}
(Russia) Kamilla Rakhimova	6	4	6^{5}
WC	(Russia) Ekaterina Shalimova	2	1
9	(Russia) Liudmila Samsonova	6	6

Qualifying competition
5	(Hungary) Tímea Babos	7	3	2
9	(Russia) Liudmila Samsonova	5	6	6

==== Sixth qualifier ====
First round
6	(Russia) Anastasia Potapova	6	6
(Italy) Martina Di Giuseppe	1	4
(Spain) Cristina Bucșa	7	2	4
11	(France) Pauline Parmentier	5	6	6

Qualifying competition
6	(Russia) Anastasia Potapova	6	6
11	(France) Pauline Parmentier	3	1
