= 2020 Brisbane International – Doubles =

Doubles
- 2020 Brisbane International

Final
- Champions: (Chinese Taipei) Hsieh Su-wei (Czech Republic) Barbora Strýcová
- Runners-up: (Australia) Ashleigh Barty (Netherlands) Kiki Bertens
- Score: 3–6, 7–6^{(9–7)}, [10–8]

Events
Singles	Doubles
- Brisbane International

Nicole Melichar and Květa Peschke were the defending champions but chose to compete with different partners. Melichar partnered Xu Yifan, but lost in the quarterfinals to Ashleigh Barty and Kiki Bertens. Peschke partnered Demi Schuurs, but lost in the first round to Darija Jurak and Alicja Rosolska.

Hsieh Su-wei and Barbora Strýcová won the title, defeating Barty and Bertens in the final, 3–6, 7–6^{(9–7)}, [10–8].

== Seeds ==
1. (Chinese Taipei) Hsieh Su-wei / (Czech Republic) Barbora Strýcová (champions)
2. (United States) Nicole Melichar / (China) Xu Yifan (quarterfinals)
3. (Chinese Taipei) Chan Hao-ching / (Chinese Taipei) Latisha Chan (first round)
4. (Czech Republic) Květa Peschke / (Netherlands) Demi Schuurs (first round)

== Draw ==
Key

- Q = Qualifier
- WC = Wild card
- LL = Lucky loser
- Alt = Alternate
- ITF = ITF entry
- PR = Protected ranking
- SR = Special ranking
- SE = Special exempt
- JE = Junior exempt
- JR = Junior Accelerator Programme entrant
- CO = College Accelerator Programme entrant
- NG = Next Gen Accelerator Program entrant
- w/o = Walkover
- r = Retired
- d = Defaulted

=== Draw ===
First round
1	(Chinese Taipei) S-w Hsieh (Czech Republic) B Strýcová	6	6
WC	(Australia) P Hon (Australia) S Sanders	3	4
(Czech Republic) L Hradecká (Slovenia) A Klepač	6	6
(Latvia) A Sevastova (United States) S Stephens	2	2
4	(Czech Republic) K Peschke (Netherlands) D Schuurs	4	3
(Croatia) D Jurak (Poland) A Rosolska	6	6
(Australia) E Perez (Australia) S Stosur	6	6^{2}	[6]
(Ukraine) L Kichenok (China) Z Yang	3	7^{7}	[10]
(France) K Mladenovic (Australia) A Tomljanović	6	6
(Russia) V Kudermetova (United States) A Riske	0	1
(Czech Republic) Ka Plíšková (Croatia) D Vekić	6	3	[10]
3	(Chinese Taipei) H-c Chan (Chinese Taipei) L Chan	3	6	[7]
(Australia) A Barty (Netherlands) K Bertens	6^{6}	6	[10]
(Estonia) A Kontaveit (Russia) A Pavlyuchenkova	7^{8}	3	[8]
(Japan) S Aoyama (Japan) E Shibahara	2	4
2	(United States) N Melichar (China) Y Xu	6	6

Quarterfinals
1	(Chinese Taipei) S-w Hsieh (Czech Republic) B Strýcová	7	6
(Czech Republic) L Hradecká (Slovenia) A Klepač	5	4
(Croatia) D Jurak (Poland) A Rosolska	3	6	[9]
(Ukraine) L Kichenok (China) Z Yang	6	4	[11]
(France) K Mladenovic (Australia) A Tomljanović	6	6
(Czech Republic) Ka Plíšková (Croatia) D Vekić	2	4
(Australia) A Barty (Netherlands) K Bertens	6	6
2	(United States) N Melichar (China) Y Xu	3	2

Semifinals
1	(Chinese Taipei) S-w Hsieh (Czech Republic) B Strýcová	7^{7}	6
(Ukraine) L Kichenok (China) Z Yang	6^{3}	3
(France) K Mladenovic (Australia) A Tomljanović
(Australia) A Barty (Netherlands) K Bertens	w/o

Final
1	(Chinese Taipei) S-w Hsieh (Czech Republic) B Strýcová	3	7^{9}	[10]
(Australia) A Barty (Netherlands) K Bertens	6	6^{7}	[8]
