= 2020 WTA Finals =

- Date: October 26 – November 2 (cancelled)
- Edition: 50th (singles) / 45th (doubles)
- Draw: 8S / 8D
- Prize money: $14,000,000
- Surface: Hard (indoor)
- Location: Shenzhen, China
- Venue: Shenzhen Bay Sports Centre
← 2019 ·	WTA Finals	· 2021 →

The 2020 WTA Finals, also known by its sponsored name Shiseido WTA Finals Shenzhen, was a women's tennis tournament that was scheduled to be held in Shenzhen, China. It would have been the 50th edition of the singles event and the 45th edition of the doubles competition, contested by eight singles players and eight doubles teams.

However, the tournament was cancelled by the WTA, due to the COVID-19 pandemic, on 24 July 2020.

== Tournament ==
The 2020 WTA Finals was scheduled to take place at the Shenzhen Bay Sports Center the week of October 26, 2020. It would have been the 50th edition of the event. The tournament would have been run by the Women's Tennis Association (WTA) as part of the 2020 WTA Tour. Shenzhen would have been the tenth city to host the WTA Finals since the tournament's inauguration in 1972.

=== Qualifying ===
In the singles, point totals are calculated by combining point totals from sixteen tournaments. Of these sixteen tournaments, a player's results from the four Grand Slam events, the four Premier Mandatory tournaments, and (for the top 20 players at the end of 2019) the best results from two Premier 5 tournaments must be included.
In the doubles, point totals are calculated by any combination of eleven tournaments throughout the year. Unlike in the singles, this combination does not need to include results from the Grand-Slam or Premier-level tournaments.

=== Format ===
Both the singles and doubles event features eight players/teams in a round robin event, split into two groups of four. Over the first four days of competition, each player/team meets the other three players/teams in her group, with the top two in each group advancing to the semifinals. The first-placed player/team in one group meets the second-placed player/team in the other group, and vice versa. The winners of each semifinal meet in the championship match.

==== Round robin tie-breaking methods ====
The final standings are made using these methods:

1. Greatest number of [match] wins.
2. Greatest number of matches played.
3. Head-to-head results if only two players are tied, or if three players are tied then:

a. If three players each have the same number of wins, a player having played less than all three matches is automatically eliminated and the player advancing to the single elimination competition is the winner of the match-up of the two remaining tied players.
b. Highest percentage of sets won.
c. Highest percentage of games won.

== Prize money and points ==
The total prize money for the BNP Paribas WTA Finals 2019 is US$14,000,000. The tables below are based on the updated draw sheet information.

Singles
Stage	Prize money	Points
Champion	RR^{1} + $3,505,000	RR + 750
Runner-up	RR + $1,180,000	RR + 330
Semifinalist	RR + $80,000	RR
Round robin win per match	+$305,000	250
Round robin loss per match	—	125
Participation Fee	3 matches = $305,000; 2 matches = $265,000; 1 match = $220,000	—
Alternates	2 matches = $210,000; 1 match = $165,000; 0 matches = $125,000	—
^{1} RR means prize money or points won in the round robin round.

Doubles
Stage	Prize money	Points
Champion	RR^{1} + $700,000	RR + 750
Runner-up	RR + $225,000	RR + 330
Semifinalist	RR + $15,000	RR
Round robin win per match	+$50,000	250
Round robin loss per match	—	125
Participation Fee	3 matches = $150,000; 2 matches = $130,000; 1 match = $110,000	—
Alternate	2 matches = $90,000; 1 match = $70,000; 0 matches = $50,000	—
^{1} RR means prize money or points won in the round robin round.

== Porsche Race to Shenzhen ==
On 16 March 2020, the WTA rankings were frozen due to the COVID-19 pandemic. As a result of the pandemic, the Race to Shenzhen has been cancelled and the promotion is no longer valid. The WTA rankings would be used for the singles qualification.

Below is the unofficial WTA Singles Race ranking for only 2020 events.

Players in gold (*) would have qualified for the WTA Finals.

Rank	Player	Grand Slam				Premier Mandatory				Best two Premier 5		Best other						Total points	Tourn	WTA Titles
Rank	Player	AUS	WI (Note: Wimbledon was cancelled due to the coronavirus pandemic.)	USO	FO (Note: French Open was postponed to September due to the coronavirus pandemic.)	IW (Note: Indian Wells Open and Miami Open were suspended due to COVID-19 pandemic.)	MI	MA (Note: Madrid Open was initially rescheduled to September, but later cancelled due to the COVID-19 pandemic.)	BE (Note: China Open was cancelled due to the COVID-19 pandemic.)	1	2	1	2	3	4	5	6	Total points	Tourn	WTA Titles
1*	(United States) Sofia Kenin	W 2000	–	R16; 240	F 1300	–	–	–	–	R32; 1	R32; 1	W 280	R16; 55	R16; 55	R32; 1	R32; 1		3,934	10	2
2*	(Japan) Naomi Osaka	R32; 130	–	W 2000	A 0	–	–	–	–	F 585		SF; 185						2,900	4	1
3*	(Romania) Simona Halep	SF; 780	–	A 0	R16; 240	–	–	–	–	W 900		W 470	W 280	QF; 100				2,770	6	3
4*	(Belarus) Victoria Azarenka	A 0	–	F 1300	R64; 70	–	–	–	–	W 900	QF; 190	F 305	R32; 1	R32; 1				2,767	7	1
5*	(Poland) Iga Świątek	R16; 240	–	R32; 130	W 2000	–	–	–	–	R32; 60	R64; 1	R32; 1						2,432	6	1
6*	(Belarus) Aryna Sabalenka	R128; 10	–	R64; 70	R32; 130	R16; 30	–	–	–	W 900	R16; 105	W 470	W 280	SF; 185	SF; 110	QF; 100	R16; 30	2,420	12	3
7*	(Czech Republic) Petra Kvitová	QF; 430	–	R16; 240	SF; 780	–	–	–	–	F 585	R32; 1	SF; 185	QF; 100					2,321	7	0
8*	(Spain) Garbiñe Muguruza	F 1300	–	R64; 70	R32; 130	–	–	–	–	SF; 350	QF; 190	SF; 110	QF; 100	QF; 60				2,310	8	0
Alternates
9	(Belgium) Elise Mertens	R16; 240	–	QF; 430	R32; 130	R16; 55	R32; 1	–	–	SF; 350	QF; 190	F 180	F 180	QF; 100	R32; 60	QF; 60	QF; 60	2,036	13	0
10	(Kazakhstan) Elena Rybakina	R32; 130	–	R64; 70	R64; 70	R32; 1	–	–	–	R16; 105	R16; 105	F 305	F 305	W 280	F 180	F 180	R32; 1	1,732	12	1

Below is the unofficial WTA Doubles Race ranking for only 2020 events.

Players in gold (*) would have qualified for the WTA Finals.

Rank	Team	Points											Total Points	Tourn	WTA Titles
Rank	Team	1	2	3	4	5	6	7	8	9	10	11	Total Points	Tourn	WTA Titles
1*	(Hungary) Tímea Babos (France) Kristina Mladenovic	W 2000	W 2000	SF; 350	R16; 120								4,470	4	2
2*	(Chinese Taipei) Hsieh Su-wei (Czech Republic) Barbora Strýcová	F 1300	W 900	W 900	W 470	W 470	R16; 240						4,280	6	4
3*	(Czech Republic) Barbora Krejčíková (Czech Republic) Kateřina Siniaková	SF; 780	SF; 780	SF; 350	W 280	SF; 185	SF; 110						2,485	6	1
4*	(United States) Nicole Melichar (China) Xu Yifan	F 650	F 585	W 470	QF; 190	QF; 100	QF; 100	R64; 10					2,105	7	1
5*	(United States) Hayley Carter (Brazil) Luisa Stefani	SF; 350	W 280	R16; 240	R16; 240	QF; 215	F 180	W 160	R16; 105	QF; 100	W 80	R32; 1	1,951	11	1
6*	(Japan) Shuko Aoyama (Japan) Ena Shibahara	W 470	QF; 430	SF; 350	R16; 240	R16; 120	SF; 110	R16; 105	QF; 100	R16; 1	R32; 1	R32; 1	1,928	11	1
7*	(Chile) Alexa Guarachi (United States) Desirae Krawczyk	F 1300	W 280	SF; 110	R16; 105	R32; 10	R32; 1	R16; 1					1,807	7	1
8*	(Czech Republic) Květa Peschke (Netherlands) Demi Schuurs	W 900	R16; 240	QF; 215	R32; 130	QF; 100	R16; 55	R16; 1					1,641	7	1
Alternates
9	(Belgium) Elise Mertens (Belarus) Aryna Sabalenka	W 470	QF; 430	QF; 215	QF; 190	R32; 130	QF; 105	QF; 60					1,600	7	1
10	(Canada) Gabriela Dabrowski (Latvia) Jeļena Ostapenko	F 585	QF; 430	R16; 240	SF; 110								1,365	4	0

== See also ==
- 2020 WTA Elite Trophy
- 2020 WTA Tour
- 2020 ATP Finals
