= 2020 Italian Open (tennis) =

- Date: 14–21 September
- Edition: 77th
- Draw: 56S / 32D (men); 56S / 28D (women)
- Prize money: € 3,465,045 (men) € 1,692,169 (women)
- Surface: Clay / outdoor
- Location: Rome, Italy
- Venue: Foro Italico

Champions

Men's singles
- (Serbia) Novak Djokovic

Women's singles
- (Romania) Simona Halep

Men's doubles
- (Spain) Marcel Granollers / (Argentina) Horacio Zeballos

Women's doubles
- (Chinese Taipei) Hsieh Su-wei / (Czech Republic) Barbora Strýcová
← 2019 ·	Italian Open	· 2021 →

The 2020 Italian Open (also known as the Rome Masters or the Internazionali BNL d'Italia for sponsorship reasons) was a professional tennis tournament played on outdoor clay courts at the Foro Italico in Rome, Italy.

Originally scheduled for 11–17 May 2020, but due to the COVID-19 pandemic, it was initially rescheduled to 20–26 September 2020, a week before the 2020 French Open. When the ATP schedule was later revised in August 2020, following the cancellation of this year's Mutua Madrid Open due to the resurgence of virus cases in Spain, organizers had to move the tournament earlier than planned by a week, and it is rescheduled to 14–21 September 2020. That leaves the dates were later placed for this year's Hamburg European Open (men) and Internationaux de Strasbourg (women). It was the 77th edition of the Italian Open and is classified as an ATP Tour Masters 1000 event on the 2020 ATP Tour and a Premier 5 event on the 2020 WTA Tour.

== Finals ==
=== Men's singles ===
- (Serbia) Novak Djokovic defeated (Argentina) Diego Schwartzman 7–5, 6–3.

This was Djokovic's 81st ATP Tour singles title, and fourth of the year.

=== Women's singles ===
- (Romania) Simona Halep defeated (Czech Republic) Karolína Plíšková, 6–0, 2–1, ret.

This was Halep's 22nd WTA Tour singles title, and third of the year. With this victory, Halep extended her winning streak to 14 matches.

=== Men's doubles ===
- (Spain) Marcel Granollers / (Argentina) Horacio Zeballos defeated (France) Jérémy Chardy / (France) Fabrice Martin, 6–4, 5–7, [10–8].

This was Granollers' 21st ATP Tour doubles title, and third of the year, and was Zeballos' 16th ATP Tour doubles title, and third of the year. This was also their fourth doubles title together as a pair.

=== Women's doubles ===
- (Chinese Taipei) Hsieh Su-wei / (Czech Republic) Barbora Strýcová defeated (Germany) Anna-Lena Friedsam / (Romania) Raluca Olaru, 6–2, 6–2

This was Hsieh's 28th WTA Tour doubles title, and fourth of the year, and was Strýcová's 31st WTA Tour doubles title, and fourth of the year. This was also their 9th doubles title together as a pair.

== Points and prize money ==
=== Point distribution ===
Event	W	F	SF	QF	Round of 16	Round of 32	Round of 64	Q	Q3	Q2	Q1
Men's singles	1000	600	360	180	90	45	10	25	16	8	0
Men's doubles	1000	600	360	180	90	0	—	—	—	—	—
Women's singles	900	585	350	190	105	60	1	30	—	20	1
Women's doubles	900	585	350	190	105	1	—	—	—	—	—

=== Prize money ===
Event	W	F	SF	QF	Round of 16	Round of 32	Round of 64	Q3	Q2	Q1
Men's singles	€205,200	€150,000	€100,000	€75,000	€61,000	€37,490	€21,190	€10,870	€5,470	€3,000
Women's singles	€205,190	€150,000	€80,000	€37,910	€19,355	€13,745	€9,000	—	€5,746	€3,000
Men's doubles	€58,860	€49,000	€39,000	€30,000	€20,990	€11,140	—	—	—	—
Women's doubles	€62,520	€40,000	€25,000	€12,903	€8,000	€6,040	—	—	—	—

== ATP singles main-draw entrants ==
=== Seeds ===
Country	Player	Rank^{1}	Seed
SRB	Novak Djokovic	1	1
ESP	Rafael Nadal	2	2
GRE	Stefanos Tsitsipas	6	3
ITA	Matteo Berrettini	8	4
FRA	Gaël Monfils	9	5
BEL	David Goffin	10	6
ITA	Fabio Fognini	12	7
ARG	Diego Schwartzman	13	8
RUS	Andrey Rublev	14	9
SUI	Stan Wawrinka	15	10
RUS	Karen Khachanov	16	11
CAN	Denis Shapovalov	17	12
CAN	Milos Raonic	18	13
CHI	Cristian Garín	19	14
BUL	Grigor Dimitrov	20	15
CAN	Félix Auger-Aliassime	21	16

^{1} Rankings are as of August 31, 2020.

=== Other entrants ===
The following players received wild cards into the main singles draw:

- (Italy) Jannik Sinner
- (Italy) Gianluca Mager
- (Italy) Salvatore Caruso
- (Italy) Stefano Travaglia

The following player used a protected ranking into the main singles draw:

- (South Africa) Kevin Anderson

The following players received entry from the singles qualifying draw:

- (Argentina) Facundo Bagnis
- (Italy) Marco Cecchinato
- (Argentina) Federico Coria
- (Spain) Alejandro Davidovich Fokina
- (Germany) Dominik Koepfer
- (Spain) Pedro Martínez
- (Italy) Lorenzo Musetti
- (United States) Tennys Sandgren

The following player received entry as a lucky loser:

- (Portugal) João Sousa

=== Withdrawals ===
Before the tournament

- (Spain) Roberto Bautista Agut → replaced by (Japan) Yoshihito Nishioka
- (United States) John Isner → replaced by (Croatia) Marin Čilić
- (Russia) Daniil Medvedev → replaced by (Italy) Lorenzo Sonego
- (Austria) Dominic Thiem → replaced by (Portugal) João Sousa
- (Germany) Alexander Zverev → replaced by (Kazakhstan) Alexander Bublik

== ATP doubles main-draw entrants ==
=== Seeds ===
Country	Player	Country	Player	Rank^{1}	Seed
COL	Juan Sebastián Cabal	COL	Robert Farah	3	1
USA	Rajeev Ram	GBR	Joe Salisbury	11	2
POL	Łukasz Kubot	BRA	Marcelo Melo	14	3
ESP	Marcel Granollers	ARG	Horacio Zeballos	19	4
CRO	Ivan Dodig	SVK	Filip Polášek	19	5
GER	Kevin Krawietz	GER	Andreas Mies	27	6
RSA	Raven Klaasen	AUT	Oliver Marach	35	7
NED	Wesley Koolhof	CRO	Nikola Mektić	38	8

- Rankings are as of August 31, 2020.

=== Other entrants ===
The following pairs received wildcards into the doubles main draw:

- (Italy) Simone Bolelli / (Italy) Fabio Fognini
- (Italy) Gianluca Mager / (Italy) Andreas Seppi
- (Italy) Lorenzo Sonego / (Italy) Andrea Vavassori

The following pair received entry using a protected ranking:

- (South Africa) Kevin Anderson / (Israel) Jonathan Erlich

== WTA singles main-draw entrants ==
=== Seeds ===
Country	Player	Rank^{1}	Seed
ROU	Simona Halep	2	1
CZE	Karolína Plíšková	3	2
USA	Sofia Kenin	4	3
UKR	Elina Svitolina	5	4
NED	Kiki Bertens	7	5
SUI	Belinda Bencic	10	6
GBR	Johanna Konta	13	7
CRO	Petra Martić	15	8
ESP	Garbiñe Muguruza	16	9
KAZ	Elena Rybakina	17	10
BEL	Elise Mertens	18	11
CZE	Markéta Vondroušová	19	12
USA	Alison Riske	20	13
EST	Anett Kontaveit	21	14
GER	Angelique Kerber	23	15
CRO	Donna Vekić	24	16

^{1} Rankings are as of August 31, 2020.

=== Other entrants ===
The following players received wild cards into the main singles draw:

- (Italy) Elisabetta Cocciaretto
- (Italy) Camila Giorgi
- (Italy) Jasmine Paolini
- (United States) Venus Williams
- (Russia) Vera Zvonareva

The following player received entry as a special exempt:

- (Belarus) Victoria Azarenka

The following players received entry from the singles qualifying draw:

- (Romania) Irina-Camelia Begu
- (Russia) Anna Blinkova
- (Spain) Aliona Bolsova
- (Japan) Misaki Doi
- (Slovenia) Kaja Juvan
- (Russia) Daria Kasatkina
- (Montenegro) Danka Kovinić
- (Netherlands) Arantxa Rus

=== Withdrawals ===
Before the tournament

- (Canada) Bianca Andreescu → replaced by (Switzerland) Jil Teichmann
- (Australia) Ashleigh Barty → replaced by (Latvia) Anastasija Sevastova
- (United States) Jennifer Brady → replaced by (Chinese Taipei) Hsieh Su-wei
- (United States) Madison Keys → replaced by (France) Caroline Garcia
- (Czech Republic) Petra Kvitová → replaced by (Czech Republic) Marie Bouzková
- (France) Kristina Mladenovic → replaced by (Australia) Ajla Tomljanović
- (Czech Republic) Karolína Muchová → replaced by (Poland) Iga Świątek
- (Japan) Naomi Osaka → replaced by (Czech Republic) Kateřina Siniaková
- (Belarus) Aryna Sabalenka → replaced by (Sweden) Rebecca Peterson
- (Greece) Maria Sakkari → replaced by (United States) Coco Gauff
- (United States) Serena Williams → replaced by (United States) Bernarda Pera
- (China) Zheng Saisai → replaced by (Slovenia) Polona Hercog

== WTA doubles main-draw entrants ==
=== Seeds ===
Country	Player	Country	Player	Rank^{1}	Seed
TPE	Hsieh Su-wei	CZE	Barbora Strýcová	3	1
HUN	Tímea Babos	CHN	Zhang Shuai	26	2
CAN	Gabriela Dabrowski	LAT	Jeļena Ostapenko	26	3
USA	Nicole Melichar	NED	Demi Schuurs	28	4
~~BEL~~	~~Elise Mertens~~	~~BEL~~	~~Kirsten Flipkens~~	~~34~~	~~5~~
RUS	Veronika Kudermetova	CZE	Kateřina Siniaková	36	6
JPN	Shuko Aoyama	JPN	Ena Shibahara	48	7
USA	Sofia Kenin	USA	Bethanie Mattek-Sands	52	8

- Rankings are as of August 31, 2020.

=== Other entrants ===
The following pairs received wildcards into the doubles main draw:

- (Italy) Elisabetta Cocciaretto / (Italy) Martina Trevisan
- (Italy) Giulia Gatto-Monticone / (Italy) Jasmine Paolini

The following pair received entry using a protected ranking:

- (Canada) Sharon Fichman / (Russia) Vera Zvonareva

The following pair received entry as alternates:

- (United States) Coco Gauff / (United States) Christina McHale
- (Poland) Magda Linette / (United States) Bernarda Pera

=== Withdrawals ===
Before the tournament

- (Belgium) Elise Mertens
- (Croatia) Donna Vekić
