= 2020 Adelaide International =

- Date: 12–18 January
- Edition: 1st
- Category: ATP Tour 250 / WTA Premier
- Draw: 28S / 16D (ATP); 30S / 16D (WTA)
- Prize money: $848,000 (women) $610,010 (men)
- Surface: Hard
- Location: Adelaide, Australia
- Venue: Memorial Drive Tennis Centre

Champions

Men's singles
- (Russia) Andrey Rublev

Women's singles
- (Australia) Ashleigh Barty

Men's doubles
- (Argentina) Máximo González / (France) Fabrice Martin

Women's doubles
- (United States) Nicole Melichar / (China) Xu Yifan
- Adelaide International

The 2020 Adelaide International was a tournament on the 2020 ATP Tour and 2020 WTA Tour. It was played on outdoor hard courts in Adelaide, Australia.

This was the first edition of the tournament, replacing the Sydney International, and took place at the Memorial Drive Tennis Centre from 12 to 18 January 2020.

== Points and prize money ==
=== Point distribution ===
Event	W	F	SF	QF	Round of 16	Round of 32	Q	Q2	Q1
Men's singles	250	150	90	45	20	0	12	6	0
Men's doubles	250	150	90	45	0	—N/a	—N/a	—N/a	—N/a
Women's singles	470	305	185	100	55	1	25	13	1
Women's doubles	470	305	185	100	1	—N/a	—N/a	—N/a	—N/a

=== Prize money ===
Event	W	F	SF	QF	Round of 16	Round of 32^{1}	Q2	Q1
Men's singles	$91,625	$50,710	$28,540	$16,250	$9,320	$5,450	$2,665	$1,385
Men's doubles *	$30,900	$15,840	$8,580	$4,910	$2,880	—N/a	—N/a	—N/a
Women's singles	$146,500	$78,160	$41,675	$22,400	$12,000	$6,550	$3,605	$1,880
Women's doubles *	$46,000	$24,200	$13,200	$6,800	$3,700	—N/a	—N/a	—N/a

_{^{1}Qualifiers prize money is also the Round of 32 prize money.}
_{*per team}

== ATP singles main-draw entrants ==
=== Seeds ===
Country	Player	Rank^{1}	Seed
~~AUS~~	~~Alex de Minaur~~	~~18~~	~~1~~
CAN	Félix Auger-Aliassime	21	2
RUS	Andrey Rublev	23	3
ESP	Pablo Carreño Busta	27	4
USA	Taylor Fritz	31	5
CHI	Cristian Garín	33	6
GER	Jan-Lennard Struff	35	7
USA	Reilly Opelka	36	8

- ^{1} Rankings are as of 6 January 2020.

=== Other entrants ===
The following players received wildcards into the singles main draw:

- (Australia) Alex Bolt
- (Australia) James Duckworth
- (Australia) Alexei Popyrin

The following players received entry from the qualifying draw:

- (France) Grégoire Barrère
- (Argentina) Federico Delbonis
- (South Africa) Lloyd Harris
- (United States) Tommy Paul

The following players received entry as a lucky loser:

- (Italy) Salvatore Caruso
- (Spain) Jaume Munar
- (France) Stéphane Robert

=== Withdrawals ===
- (Australia) Alex de Minaur → replaced by (Spain) Jaume Munar
- (Serbia) Novak Djokovic → replaced by (France) Stéphane Robert
- (France) Lucas Pouille → replaced by (Kazakhstan) Alexander Bublik
- (Spain) Fernando Verdasco → replaced by (Italy) Salvatore Caruso

== ATP doubles main-draw entrants ==
=== Seeds ===
Country	Player	Country	Player	Rank^{1}	Seed
~~COL~~	~~Juan Sebastián Cabal~~	~~COL~~	~~Robert Farah~~	~~2~~	~~1~~
POL	Łukasz Kubot	BRA	Marcelo Melo	12	2
GER	Kevin Krawietz	GER	Andreas Mies	20	3
CRO	Ivan Dodig	SVK	Filip Polášek	25	4

- ^{1} Rankings are as of 6 January 2020.

=== Other entrants ===
The following pairs received wildcards into the doubles main draw:

- (Australia) Alex Bolt / (Australia) Alexei Popyrin
- (Australia) Lleyton Hewitt / (Australia) Jordan Thompson

== WTA singles main-draw entrants ==
=== Seeds ===
Country	Player	Rank^{1}	Seed
AUS	Ashleigh Barty	1	1
ROU	Simona Halep	3	2
~~CZE~~	~~Petra Kvitová~~	~~7~~	~~3~~
SUI	Belinda Bencic	8	4
~~NED~~	~~Kiki Bertens~~	~~9~~	~~5~~
BLR	Aryna Sabalenka	11	6
USA	Sofia Kenin	14	7
CZE	Markéta Vondroušová	16	8
GER	Angelique Kerber	18	9

- ^{1} Rankings are as of 6 January 2020.

=== Other entrants ===
The following players received wildcards into the singles main draw:

- (Switzerland) Belinda Bencic
- (Australia) Priscilla Hon
- (Belarus) Aryna Sabalenka
- (Australia) Ajla Tomljanović

The following players received entry from the qualifying draw:

- (Switzerland) Viktorija Golubic
- (Russia) Daria Kasatkina
- (United States) Bernarda Pera
- (Kazakhstan) Yulia Putintseva
- (Australia) Arina Rodionova
- (Belarus) Aliaksandra Sasnovich

The following players received entry as a lucky loser:

- (Hungary) Tímea Babos
- (Russia) Vitalia Diatchenko
- (Germany) Tatjana Maria

=== Withdrawals ===
Before the tournament

- (Netherlands) Kiki Bertens → replaced by (Russia) Vitalia Diatchenko
- (United Kingdom) Johanna Konta → replaced by (Russia) Anastasia Pavlyuchenkova
- (Czech Republic) Petra Kvitová → replaced by (Hungary) Tímea Babos
- (Croatia) Petra Martić → replaced by (Chinese Taipei) Hsieh Su-wei
- (United States) Alison Riske → replaced by (Germany) Tatjana Maria
- (United States) Venus Williams → replaced by (Switzerland) Belinda Bencic

== WTA doubles main-draw entrants ==
=== Seeds ===
Country	Player	Country	Player	Rank^{1}	Seed
USA	Nicole Melichar	CHN	Xu Yifan	28	1
CZE	Květa Peschke	NED	Demi Schuurs	35	2
CAN	Gabriela Dabrowski	CRO	Darija Jurak	50	3
CHN	Duan Yingying	USA	Desirae Krawczyk	57	4

- ^{1} Rankings are as of 6 January 2020.

== Champions ==
=== Men's singles ===
- (Russia) Andrey Rublev def. (South Africa) Lloyd Harris, 6–3, 6–0

=== Women's singles ===
- (Australia) Ashleigh Barty def. (Ukraine) Dayana Yastremska, 6–2, 7–5

=== Men's doubles ===
- (Argentina) Máximo González / (France) Fabrice Martin def. (Croatia) Ivan Dodig / (Slovakia) Filip Polášek, 7–6^{(14–12)}, 6–3

=== Women's doubles ===
- (United States) Nicole Melichar / (China) Xu Yifan def. (Canada) Gabriela Dabrowski / (Croatia) Darija Jurak, 2–6, 7–5, [10–5]
