= 2020 Adelaide International – Men's doubles =

Men's doubles
- 2020 Adelaide International

Final
- Champions: (Argentina) Máximo González (France) Fabrice Martin
- Runners-up: (Croatia) Ivan Dodig (Slovakia) Filip Polášek
- Score: 7–6^{(14–12)}, 6–3

Details
- Draw: 16 (2 WC )
- Seeds: 4

Events
| Singles | men | women |
| Doubles | men | women |
- Adelaide International

Máximo González and Fabrice Martin defeated Ivan Dodig and Filip Polášek in the final, 7–6^{(14–12)}, 6–3, to win the men's doubles tennis title at the 2020 Adelaide International. This was the first edition of the event.

== Seeds ==
1. (Colombia) Juan Sebastián Cabal / (Colombia) Robert Farah (withdrew)
2. (Poland) Łukasz Kubot / (Brazil) Marcelo Melo (quarterfinals)
3. (Germany) Kevin Krawietz / (Germany) Andreas Mies (first round)
4. (Croatia) Ivan Dodig / (Slovakia) Filip Polášek (final)

== Draw ==
Key

- Q = Qualifier
- WC = Wild card
- LL = Lucky loser
- Alt = Alternate
- ITF = ITF entry
- PR = Protected ranking
- SR = Special ranking
- SE = Special exempt
- JE = Junior exempt
- JR = Junior Accelerator Programme entrant
- CO = College Accelerator Programme entrant
- NG = Next Gen Accelerator Program entrant
- w/o = Walkover
- r = Retired
- d = Defaulted

=== Draw ===
First round
Alt | (South Africa) L Harris (Australia) J-P Smith | 3 | 3
(Austria) J Melzer (France) É Roger-Vasselin | 6 | 6
(Brazil) M Demoliner (Netherlands) M Middelkoop | 3 | 6 | [4]
(United Kingdom) J Murray (United Kingdom) N Skupski | 6 | 4 | [10]
4 | (Croatia) I Dodig (Slovakia) F Polášek | 6 | 7^{7}
PR | (Australia) C Guccione (Sweden) R Lindstedt | 3 | 6^{1}
(Chile) C Garín (Argentina) JI Londero | 6 | 2 | [10]
WC | (Australia) L Hewitt (Australia) J Thompson | 3 | 6 | [7]
(United States) R Ram (United Kingdom) J Salisbury | 6 | 6
(Czech Republic) R Jebavý (Slovakia) I Zelenay | 2 | 3
(Netherlands) W Koolhof (Croatia) N Mektić | 7^{7} | 6
3 | (Germany) K Krawietz (Germany) A Mies | 6^{3} | 2
WC | (Australia) A Bolt (Australia) A Popyrin | 4 | 3
(Argentina) M González (France) F Martin | 6 | 6
(South Africa) R Klaasen (Austria) O Marach | 2 | 4
2 | (Poland) Ł Kubot (Brazil) M Melo | 6 | 6

Quarter-finals
(Austria) J Melzer (France) É Roger-Vasselin | 3 | 6 | [11]
(United Kingdom) J Murray (United Kingdom) N Skupski | 6 | 1 | [13]
4 | (Croatia) I Dodig (Slovakia) F Polášek | 6 | 6
(Chile) C Garín (Argentina) JI Londero | 4 | 3
(United States) R Ram (United Kingdom) J Salisbury | 6 | 6
(Netherlands) W Koolhof (Croatia) N Mektić | 4 | 3
(Argentina) M González (France) F Martin | 6 | 7
2 | (Poland) Ł Kubot (Brazil) M Melo | 4 | 5

Semi-finals
(United Kingdom) J Murray (United Kingdom) N Skupski | 7 | 3 | [13]
4 | (Croatia) I Dodig (Slovakia) F Polášek | 5 | 6 | [15]
(United States) R Ram (United Kingdom) J Salisbury | 3 | 4
(Argentina) M González (France) F Martin | 6 | 6

Final
4 | (Croatia) I Dodig (Slovakia) F Polášek | 6^{12} | 3
(Argentina) M González (France) F Martin | 7^{14} | 6
