= 2020 Italian Open – Men's singles =

Men's singles
- 2020 Italian Open

Final
- Champion: (Serbia) Novak Djokovic
- Runner-up: (Argentina) Diego Schwartzman
- Score: 7–5, 6–3

Details
- Draw: 56 (8 Q / 4 WC )
- Seeds: 16

Events
Singles	men	women
Doubles	men	women
← 2019 ·	Italian Open	· 2021 →

Novak Djokovic defeated Diego Schwartzman in the final, 7–5, 6–3 to win the men's singles tennis title at the 2020 Italian Open. It was his fifth Italian Open title and record 36th Masters 1000 title overall. Djokovic entered his 287th week as world No. 1 (surpassing Pete Sampras for the second-most of all time) following the tournament.

Rafael Nadal was the two-time defending champion, but lost to Schwartzman in the quarterfinals.

Casper Ruud became the first Norwegian to reach a Masters semifinal, surpassing his father Christian Ruud, who reached the quarterfinals of Monte Carlo in 1997.

By defeating Stan Wawrinka in the first round, Lorenzo Musetti became the first player born in 2002 to win an ATP match.

== Seeds ==
The top eight seeds received a bye into the second round.

1. (Serbia) Novak Djokovic (champion)
2. (Spain) Rafael Nadal (quarterfinals)
3. (Greece) Stefanos Tsitsipas (second round)
4. (Italy) Matteo Berrettini (quarterfinals)
5. (France) Gaël Monfils (second round)
6. (Belgium) David Goffin (second round)
7. (Italy) Fabio Fognini (second round)
8. (Argentina) Diego Schwartzman (final)

9. (Russia) Andrey Rublev (second round)
10. (Switzerland) Stan Wawrinka (first round)
11. (Russia) Karen Khachanov (first round)
12. (Canada) Denis Shapovalov (semifinals)
13. (Canada) Milos Raonic (second round)
14. (Chile) Cristian Garín (first round)
15. (Bulgaria) Grigor Dimitrov (quarterfinals)
16. (Canada) Félix Auger-Aliassime (first round)

Click on the seed number of a player to go to their draw section.

The players who also received a bye into the second round were as follows, corresponding each semifinalist from the US Open:

- (Spain) Pablo Carreño Busta

The other seven byes were removed and therefore seven players were added into the main draw.

== Draw ==
=== Key ===
- Q = Qualifier
- WC = Wild card
- LL = Lucky loser
- Alt = Alternate
- ITF = ITF entry
- PR = Protected ranking
- SR = Special ranking
- SE = Special exempt
- JE = Junior exempt
- JR = Junior Accelerator Programme entrant
- CO = College Accelerator Programme entrant
- NG = Next Gen Accelerator Program entrant
- w/o = Walkover
- r = Retired
- d = Defaulted

=== Finals ===
Quarterfinals
1	(Serbia) Novak Djokovic	6	4	6
Q	(Germany) Dominik Koepfer	3	6	3
4	(Italy) Matteo Berrettini	6	3	6^{5}
(Norway) Casper Ruud	4	6	7^{7}
12	(Canada) Denis Shapovalov	6	3	6
15	(Bulgaria) Grigor Dimitrov	2	6	2
8	(Argentina) Diego Schwartzman	6	7
2	(Spain) Rafael Nadal	2	5

Semifinals
1	(Serbia) Novak Djokovic	7	6
(Norway) Casper Ruud	5	3
12	(Canada) Denis Shapovalov	4	7	6^{4}
8	(Argentina) Diego Schwartzman	6	5	7^{7}

Final
1	(Serbia) Novak Djokovic	7	6
8	(Argentina) Diego Schwartzman	5	3

=== Top half ===
==== Section 1 ====
First round
Q	(United States) T Sandgren	6	3	6^{4}
WC	(Italy) S Caruso	3	6	7^{7}
Q	(Italy) M Cecchinato	3	7^{9}	6
(United Kingdom) K Edmund	6	6^{7}	2
(Serbia) F Krajinović	6	7
16	(Canada) F Auger-Aliassime	4	5
10	(Switzerland) S Wawrinka	0	6^{2}
Q	(Italy) L Musetti	6	7^{7}
(Japan) K Nishikori	6	7^{7}
(Spain) A Ramos Viñolas	4	6^{3}
Q	(Germany) D Koepfer	3	6	7^{7}
(Australia) A de Minaur	6	3	6^{5}

Second round
1	(Serbia) N Djokovic	6	6
WC	(Italy) S Caruso	3	2
Q	(Italy) M Cecchinato	4	1
(Serbia) F Krajinović	6	6
Q	(Italy) L Musetti	6	6
(Japan) K Nishikori	3	4
Q	(Germany) D Koepfer	6	6
5	(France) G Monfils	2	4

Third round
1	(Serbia) N Djokovic	7^{9}	6
(Serbia) F Krajinović	6^{7}	3
Q	(Italy) L Musetti	4	0
Q	(Germany) D Koepfer	6	6

Quarterfinals
1	(Serbia) N Djokovic	6	4	6
Q	(Germany) D Koepfer	3	6	3

==== Section 2 ====
First round
(Germany) J-L Struff	1	6^{5}
Q	(Argentina) F Coria	6	7^{7}
(United States) T Fritz	4	6^{4}
WC	(Italy) S Travaglia	6	7^{7}
(Croatia) B Ćorić	6	6
14	(Chile) C Garín	4	4
11	(Russia) K Khachanov	3	6	1
(Norway) C Ruud	6	3	6
(Italy) L Sonego	6	6
(Georgia (country)) N Basilashvili	3	1
(Croatia) M Čilić	6^{4}	6	6
(Kazakhstan) A Bublik	7^{7}	2	4

Second round
4	(Italy) M Berrettini	7	6
Q	(Argentina) F Coria	5	1
WC	(Italy) S Travaglia	7^{7}	7
(Croatia) B Ćorić	6^{2}	5
(Norway) C Ruud	6	6
(Italy) L Sonego	3	4
(Croatia) M Čilić	6	6
6	(Belgium) D Goffin	2	2

Third round
4	(Italy) M Berrettini	7^{7}	7^{7}
WC	(Italy) S Travaglia	6^{5}	6^{1}
(Norway) C Ruud	6	7^{8}
(Croatia) M Čilić	2	6^{6}

Quarterfinals
4	(Italy) M Berrettini	6	3	6^{5}
(Norway) C Ruud	4	6	7^{7}

=== Bottom half ===
==== Section 3 ====
First round
PR	(South Africa) K Anderson	3	6^{5}
(France) U Humbert	6	7^{7}
(United States) S Querrey	3	6^{3}
Q	(Spain) P Martínez	6	7^{7}
(Argentina) G Pella	2	3
12	(Canada) D Shapovalov	6	6
15	(Bulgaria) G Dimitrov	7	6
WC	(Italy) G Mager	5	1
(Japan) Y Nishioka	6	6
(Serbia) M Kecmanović	4	1
(France) B Paire	2	1
WC	(Italy) J Sinner	6	6

Second round
7	(Italy) F Fognini	5	6^{4}
(France) U Humbert	7	7^{7}
Q	(Spain) P Martínez	4	4
12	(Canada) D Shapovalov	6	6
15	(Bulgaria) G Dimitrov	6	6
(Japan) Y Nishioka	1	0
WC	(Italy) J Sinner	6	6^{9}	6
3	(Greece) S Tsitsipas	1	7^{11}	2

Third round
(France) U Humbert	7^{7}	1	4
12	(Canada) D Shapovalov	6^{5}	6	6
15	(Bulgaria) G Dimitrov	4	6	6
WC	(Italy) J Sinner	6	4	4

Quarterfinals
12	(Canada) D Shapovalov	6	3	6
15	(Bulgaria) G Dimitrov	2	6	2

==== Section 4 ====
First round
LL	(Portugal) J Sousa	5	6^{2}
(Australia) J Millman	7	7^{7}
(United Kingdom) D Evans	3	6	5
(Poland) H Hurkacz	6	3	7
Q	(Argentina) F Bagnis	4	4
9	(Russia) A Rublev	6	6
13	(Canada) M Raonic	7^{7}	6
(France) A Mannarino	6^{3}	2
Q	(Spain) A Davidovich Fokina	4	4
(Serbia) D Lajović	6	6

Second round
8	(Argentina) D Schwartzman	6	7^{7}
(Australia) J Millman	4	6^{1}
(Poland) H Hurkacz	7^{8}	3	6
9	(Russia) A Rublev	6^{6}	6	2
13	(Canada) M Raonic	6^{3}	6	2
(Serbia) D Lajović	7^{7}	4	6
(Spain) P Carreño Busta	1	1
2	(Spain) R Nadal	6	6

Third round
8	(Argentina) D Schwartzman	3	6	6
(Poland) H Hurkacz	6	2	4
(Serbia) D Lajović	1	3
2	(Spain) R Nadal	6	6

Quarterfinals
8	(Argentina) D Schwartzman	6	7
2	(Spain) R Nadal	2	5

== Qualifying ==
=== Seeds ===
1. (United States) Tennys Sandgren (qualified)
2. (France) Gilles Simon (second round)
3. (Slovenia) Aljaž Bedene (second round)
4. (Kazakhstan) ~~Alexander Bublik~~ (moved to main draw)
5. (Spain) Fernando Verdasco (first round)
6. (United States) Tommy Paul (first round)
7. (France) Jérémy Chardy (second round)
8. (Argentina) Juan Ignacio Londero (first round)
9. (Portugal) João Sousa (qualifying competition, lucky loser)
10. (Moldova) Radu Albot (first round)
11. (Sweden) Mikael Ymer (qualifying competition)
12. (Belarus) Egor Gerasimov (first round)
13. (South Korea) Kwon Soon-woo (first round)
14. (United Kingdom) Cameron Norrie (first round)
15. (France) Corentin Moutet (qualifying competition)
16. (Brazil) Thiago Monteiro (first round)

=== Qualifiers ===
1. (United States) Tennys Sandgren
2. (Germany) Dominik Koepfer
3. (Italy) Marco Cecchinato
4. (Italy) Lorenzo Musetti
5. (Argentina) Federico Coria
6. (Argentina) Facundo Bagnis
7. (Spain) Pedro Martínez
8. (Spain) Alejandro Davidovich Fokina

=== Lucky loser ===
1. (Portugal) João Sousa

=== Qualifying draw ===
==== First qualifier ====
First round
(Australia) Alexei Popyrin	6	7^{8}
(Australia) Luke Saville	3	6^{6}
(Italy) Matteo Gigante	3	6	6^{1}
(Belarus) Ilya Ivashka	6	4	7^{7}
WC	(Italy) Luciano Darderi	6	3	1
9	(Portugal) João Sousa	3	6	6

Second round
1	(United States) Tennys Sandgren	6^{6}	6	6
(Australia) Alexei Popyrin	7^{8}	4	2
(Belarus) Ilya Ivashka	4	6^{3}
9	(Portugal) João Sousa	6	7^{7}

Qualifying competition
1	(United States) Tennys Sandgren	6	6
9	(Portugal) João Sousa	3	0

==== Second qualifier ====
First round
(Italy) Flavio Cobolli	6^{2}	6	0
(Germany) Dominik Koepfer	7^{7}	3	6
(Kazakhstan) Mikhail Kukushkin	6^{3}	6	7
(Sweden) Elias Ymer	7^{7}	4	5
(Japan) Taro Daniel	4	7^{7}	6
16	(Brazil) Thiago Monteiro	6	6^{4}	4

Second round
2	(France) Gilles Simon	5	6	3
(Germany) Dominik Koepfer	7	2	6
(Kazakhstan) Mikhail Kukushkin	6	6
(Japan) Taro Daniel	2	2

Qualifying competition
(Germany) Dominik Koepfer	2	6	6
(Kazakhstan) Mikhail Kukushkin	6	4	2

==== Third qualifier ====
First round
(Russia) Evgeny Donskoy	5	4
(Slovakia) Jozef Kovalík	7	6
(Italy) Andreas Seppi	2	6	6^{1}
(United States) Bradley Klahn	6	4	7^{7}
(Italy) Marco Cecchinato	6	5	6
12	(Belarus) Egor Gerasimov	2	7	3

Second round
3	(Slovenia) Aljaž Bedene	6^{5}	3
(Slovakia) Jozef Kovalík	7^{7}	6
(United States) Bradley Klahn	1	4
(Italy) Marco Cecchinato	6	6

Qualifying competition
(Slovakia) Jozef Kovalík	2	1
(Italy) Marco Cecchinato	6	6

==== Fourth qualifier ====
First round
Alt	(Italy) Jacopo Berrettini	3	2
(Argentina) Leonardo Mayer	6	6
(Spain) Bernabé Zapata Miralles	6^{2}	6	1
WC	(Italy) Lorenzo Musetti	7^{7}	0	6
(Bolivia) Hugo Dellien	7	6
(Italy) Alessandro Giannessi	5	4
(Italy) Giulio Zeppieri	6	6
14	(United Kingdom) Cameron Norrie	3	1

Second round
(Argentina) Leonardo Mayer	6^{4}	3
WC	(Italy) Lorenzo Musetti	7^{7}	6
(Bolivia) Hugo Dellien	6^{7}	6	0
(Italy) Giulio Zeppieri	7^{9}	3	6

Qualifying competition
WC	(Italy) Lorenzo Musetti	6	5	6
(Italy) Giulio Zeppieri	1	7	3

==== Fifth qualifier ====
First round
5	(Spain) Fernando Verdasco	0	2
(Bosnia and Herzegovina) Damir Džumhur	6	6
(Spain) Tommy Robredo	1	6	6
(Italy) Gian Marco Moroni	6	3	4
(Italy) Paolo Lorenzi	6	4	5
(Argentina) Federico Coria	3	6	7
(Canada) Steven Diez	6	7
10	(Moldova) Radu Albot	4	5

Second round
(Bosnia and Herzegovina) Damir Džumhur	7	6
(Spain) Tommy Robredo	5	4
(Argentina) Federico Coria	6	6
(Canada) Steven Diez	4	2

Qualifying competition
(Bosnia and Herzegovina) Damir Džumhur	1	1
(Argentina) Federico Coria	6	6

==== Sixth qualifier ====
First round
6	(United States) Tommy Paul	5	4
(Argentina) Facundo Bagnis	7	6
(Australia) James Duckworth	7^{7}	4
(Japan) Yasutaka Uchiyama	6^{2}	0^{r}
(Latvia) Ernests Gulbis	6^{6}	1
(Australia) Marc Polmans	7^{8}	6
(United States) Marcos Giron	6	5	6^{6}
11	(Sweden) Mikael Ymer	4	7	7^{8}

Second round
(Argentina) Facundo Bagnis	7^{7}	6
(Australia) James Duckworth	6^{4}	1
(Australia) Marc Polmans	4	4
11	(Sweden) Mikael Ymer	6	6

Qualifying competition
(Argentina) Facundo Bagnis	7	6
11	(Sweden) Mikael Ymer	5	1

==== Seventh qualifier ====
First round
7	(France) Jérémy Chardy	6	6
Alt	(New Zealand) Michael Venus	1	1
(Slovakia) Andrej Martin	5	7^{7}	7
(Colombia) Daniel Elahi Galán	7	6^{4}	5
WC	(Italy) Francesco Forti	4	0
(Spain) Pedro Martínez	6	6
(Italy) Matteo Viola	7^{7}	1	7^{7}
13	(South Korea) Kwon Soon-woo	6^{5}	6	6^{5}

Second round
7	(France) Jérémy Chardy	2	2
(Slovakia) Andrej Martin	6	6
(Spain) Pedro Martínez	4	6	6
(Italy) Matteo Viola	6	2	4

Qualifying competition
(Slovakia) Andrej Martin	3	2
(Spain) Pedro Martínez	6	6

==== Eighth qualifier ====
First round
8	(Argentina) Juan Ignacio Londero	6	2	2
(Spain) Alejandro Davidovich Fokina	2	6	6
(Japan) Yūichi Sugita	6	6
(South Africa) Lloyd Harris	4	2
(Slovakia) Filip Horanský	2	4
(Italy) Roberto Marcora	6	6
(Spain) Roberto Carballés Baena	5	2^{r}
15	(France) Corentin Moutet	7	4

Second round
(Spain) Alejandro Davidovich Fokina	6	6
(Japan) Yūichi Sugita	0	1
(Italy) Roberto Marcora	7^{7}	3	1^{r}
15	(France) Corentin Moutet	6^{2}	6	2

Qualifying competition
(Spain) Alejandro Davidovich Fokina	6	6
15	(France) Corentin Moutet	1	2
