= 2020 Adelaide International – Men's singles =

Men's singles
- 2020 Adelaide International

Final
- Champion: (Russia) Andrey Rublev
- Runner-up: (South Africa) Lloyd Harris
- Score: 6–3, 6–0

Details
- Draw: 28 (4 Q / 3 WC )
- Seeds: 8

Events
Singles	men	women
Doubles	men	women
- Adelaide International

Andrey Rublev defeated Lloyd Harris in the final, 6–3, 6–0, to win the men's singles tennis title at the 2020 Adelaide International. This was the first edition of the event.

== Seeds ==
1. (Australia) Alex de Minaur (withdrew)
2. (Canada) Félix Auger-Aliassime (semifinals)
3. (Russia) Andrey Rublev (champion)
4. (Spain) Pablo Carreño Busta (quarterfinals)
5. (United States) Taylor Fritz (first round)
6. (Chile) Cristian Garín (first round)
7. (Germany) Jan-Lennard Struff (second round)
8. (United States) Reilly Opelka (first round)

== Draw ==
=== Finals ===
Semi-finals
Q	(United States) Tommy Paul	4	7^{7}	3
Q	(South Africa) Lloyd Harris	6	6^{3}	6
3	(Russia) Andrey Rublev	7^{7}	6^{7}	6
2	(Canada) Félix Auger-Aliassime	6^{5}	7^{9}	4

Final
Q	(South Africa) Lloyd Harris	3	0
3	(Russia) Andrey Rublev	6	6

=== Top half ===
First round
(Spain) A Ramos Viñolas	6	6^{5}	6
(Australia) J Thompson	4	7^{7}	3
(Slovenia) A Bedene	4	4
Q	(United States) T Paul	6	6
(Uruguay) P Cuevas	5	7^{11}	7^{7}
8	(United States) R Opelka	7	6^{9}	6^{2}
(France) G Simon	3	5
(France) J Chardy	6	7
WC	(Australia) A Popyrin	6^{3}	6	4
(Serbia) L Đere	7^{7}	3	6
Q	(South Africa) L Harris	7^{7}	3	6
6	(Chile) C Garín	6^{5}	6	4

Second round
LL	(Spain) J Munar	6^{3}	3
(Spain) A Ramos Viñolas	7^{7}	6
Q	(United States) T Paul	6	6
(Uruguay) P Cuevas	1	2
4	(Spain) P Carreño Busta	6	6
(France) J Chardy	3	2
(Serbia) L Đere	6^{5}	3
Q	(South Africa) L Harris	7^{7}	6

Quarter-finals
(Spain) A Ramos Viñolas	3	4
Q	(United States) T Paul	6	6
4	(Spain) P Carreño Busta	3	3
Q	(South Africa) L Harris	6	6

Semi-finals
Q	(United States) T Paul	4	7^{7}	3
Q	(South Africa) L Harris	6	6^{3}	6

=== Bottom half ===
First round
5	(United States) T Fritz	4	6^{4}
(Kazakhstan) A Bublik	6	7^{7}
(Argentina) JI Londero	2	4
(United Kingdom) D Evans	6	6
(United States) S Querrey	6^{4}	6	7^{7}
Q	(France) G Barrère	7^{7}	2	6^{5}
7	(Germany) J-L Struff	6	6
LL	(Italy) S Caruso	4	2
LL	(France) S Robert	4	6	0
WC	(Australia) A Bolt	6	2	6
Q	(Argentina) F Delbonis	4	4
WC	(Australia) J Duckworth	6	6

Second round
(Kazakhstan) A Bublik	5	2
(United Kingdom) D Evans	7	6
(United States) S Querrey	3	3
3	(Russia) A Rublev	6	6
7	(Germany) J-L Struff	3	4
WC	(Australia) A Bolt	6	6
WC	(Australia) J Duckworth	3	6^{0}
2	(Canada) F Auger-Aliassime	6	7^{7}

Quarter-finals
(United Kingdom) D Evans	4	6	3
3	(Russia) A Rublev	6	3	6
WC	(Australia) A Bolt	3	0
2	(Canada) F Auger-Aliassime	6	6

Semi-finals
3	(Russia) A Rublev	7^{7}	6^{7}	6
2	(Canada) F Auger-Aliassime	6^{5}	7^{9}	4

== Qualifying ==
=== Seeds ===
1. (Italy) Andreas Seppi (Accepted into Auckland main draw)
2. (Argentina) Federico Delbonis (qualified)
3. (Chile) Nicolás Jarry (qualifying competition)
4. (France) Grégoire Barrère (qualified)
5. (Spain) Jaume Munar (qualifying competition; lucky loser)
6. (United States) Tommy Paul (qualified)
7. (Italy) Salvatore Caruso (qualifying competition; lucky loser)
8. (South Africa) Lloyd Harris (qualified)

=== Qualifiers ===
1. (South Africa) Lloyd Harris
2. (Argentina) Federico Delbonis
3. (United States) Tommy Paul
4. (France) Grégoire Barrère

=== Lucky losers ===
1. (Spain) Jaume Munar
2. (Italy) Salvatore Caruso
3. (France) Stéphane Robert

=== Qualifying draw ===
==== First qualifier ====
First round
Alt	(France) Stéphane Robert	6	6
(Australia) Bradley Mousley	4	0
Alt	(Belarus) Mikalai Haliak	0	3
8	(South Africa) Lloyd Harris	6	6

Qualifying competition
Alt	(France) Stéphane Robert	5	4
8	(South Africa) Lloyd Harris	7	6

==== Second qualifier ====
First round
2	(Argentina) Federico Delbonis	6	6
WC	(Australia) Edward Winter	0	2
(Australia) Marc Polmans	6	5	3
7	(Italy) Salvatore Caruso	4	7	6

Qualifying competition
2	(Argentina) Federico Delbonis	7^{7}	7^{9}
7	(Italy) Salvatore Caruso	6^{4}	6^{7}

==== Third qualifier ====
First round
3	(Chile) Nicolás Jarry	6	6
(Australia) John-Patrick Smith	3	3
(Australia) Matthew Romios	2	2
6	(United States) Tommy Paul	6	6

Qualifying competition
3	(Chile) Nicolás Jarry	3	2
6	(United States) Tommy Paul	6	6

==== Fourth qualifier ====
First round
4	(France) Grégoire Barrère	6	6
(Australia) Andrew Harris	1	3
(Australia) Thomas Fancutt	3	3
5	(Spain) Jaume Munar	6	6

Qualifying competition
4	(France) Grégoire Barrère	6^{5}	6	6
5	(Spain) Jaume Munar	7^{7}	4	4
