= 2020 Italian Open – Men's doubles =

Men's doubles
- 2020 Italian Open

Final
- Champions: (Spain) Marcel Granollers; (Argentina) Horacio Zeballos
- Runners-up: (France) Jérémy Chardy; (France) Fabrice Martin
- Score: 6–4, 5–7, [10–8]

Events
Singles	men	women
Doubles	men	women
← 2019 ·	Italian Open	· 2021 →

Juan Sebastián Cabal and Robert Farah were the two-time defending champions, but lost in the second round to Rohan Bopanna and Denis Shapovalov.

Marcel Granollers and Horacio Zeballos won the title, defeating Jérémy Chardy and Fabrice Martin in the final, 6–4, 5–7, [10–8].

== Seeds ==
1. (Colombia) Juan Sebastián Cabal / (Colombia) Robert Farah (second round)
2. (United States) Rajeev Ram / (United Kingdom) Joe Salisbury (first round)
3. (Poland) Łukasz Kubot / (Brazil) Marcelo Melo (first round)
4. (Spain) Marcel Granollers / (Argentina) Horacio Zeballos (champions)
5. (Croatia) Ivan Dodig / (Slovakia) Filip Polášek (first round)
6. (Germany) Kevin Krawietz / (Germany) Andreas Mies (first round)
7. (South Africa) Raven Klaasen / (Austria) Oliver Marach (first round)
8. (Netherlands) Wesley Koolhof / (Croatia) Nikola Mektić (second round)

== Draw ==
=== Key ===
- Q = Qualifier
- WC = Wild card
- LL = Lucky loser
- Alt = Alternate
- SE = Special exempt
- PR = Protected ranking
- ITF = ITF entry
- JE = Junior exempt
- w/o = Walkover
- r = Retired
- d = Defaulted
- SR = Special ranking

=== Finals ===
Semifinals

Final

(France) Jérémy Chardy
(France) Fabrice Martin
6^{5}
6
[10]

- (Austria) Jürgen Melzer
- (France) Édouard Roger-Vasselin
7^{7}
4
[4]

- (France) Jérémy Chardy
- (France) Fabrice Martin
4
7
[8]

4
(Spain) Marcel Granollers
(Argentina) Horacio Zeballos
6
5
[10]

4
(Spain) Marcel Granollers
(Argentina) Horacio Zeballos
7^{7}
7^{7}

- (Australia) John Peers
- (New Zealand) Michael Venus
6^{4}
6^{5}

=== Top half ===
First round

Second round

Quarterfinals

Semifinals

1
(Colombia) JS Cabal
(Colombia) R Farah
6
6

- (Spain) P Carreño Busta
- (Australia) A de Minaur
2
3

1
- (Colombia) JS Cabal
- (Colombia) R Farah
3
6
[5]

(India) R Bopanna
(Canada) D Shapovalov
6
6

(India) R Bopanna
(Canada) D Shapovalov
6
3
[10]

- (Chile) C Garín
- (Argentina) G Pella
4
4

- (India) R Bopanna
- (Canada) D Shapovalov
6
5
[7]

(France) J Chardy
(France) F Martin
7^{7}
6

(France) J Chardy
(France) F Martin
4
7
[10]

PR
- (South Africa) K Anderson
- (Israel) J Erlich
6^{1}
4

(France) J Chardy
(France) F Martin
4
7^{7}
[10]

- (Netherlands) J-J Rojer
- (Romania) H Tecău
4
4

8
- (Netherlands) W Koolhof
- (Croatia) N Mektić
6
6^{2}
[0]

8
(Netherlands) W Koolhof
(Croatia) N Mektić
6
6

(France) J Chardy
(France) F Martin
6^{5}
6
[10]

3
- (Poland) Ł Kubot
- (Brazil) M Melo
6^{6}
6
[6]

- (Austria) J Melzer
- (France) É Roger-Vasselin
7^{7}
4
[4]

(France) N Mahut
(France) B Paire
7^{8}
2
[10]

- (France) N Mahut
- (France) B Paire
2
4

(Austria) J Melzer
(France) É Roger-Vasselin
6
1
[11]

(Austria) J Melzer
(France) É Roger-Vasselin
6
6

- (Pakistan) A-u-H Qureshi
- (Greece) S Tsitsipas
4
6
[9]

(Austria) J Melzer
(France) É Roger-Vasselin
6
6

(Argentina) M González
(Argentina) D Schwartzman
5
6
[10]

- (Australia) M Purcell
- (Australia) L Saville
1
1

- (Bulgaria) G Dimitrov
- (United Kingdom) D Evans
7
2
[8]

- (Argentina) M González
- (Argentina) D Schwartzman
6
3
[9]

(Australia) M Purcell
(Australia) L Saville
7
7

(Australia) M Purcell
(Australia) L Saville
2
6
[11]

7
- (South Africa) R Klaasen
- (Austria) O Marach
5
5

=== Bottom half ===
First round

Second round

Quarterfinals

Semifinals

5
- (Croatia) I Dodig
- (Slovakia) F Polášek
1
3

(Croatia) M Pavić
(Brazil) B Soares
6
6

(Croatia) M Pavić
(Brazil) B Soares
6
6

(Belgium) S Gillé
(Belgium) J Vliegen
6^{4}
7
[10]

- (Belgium) S Gillé
- (Belgium) J Vliegen
3
2

WC
- (Italy) S Bolelli
- (Italy) F Fognini
7^{7}
5
[8]

- (Croatia) M Pavić
- (Brazil) B Soares
6
6^{7}
[6]

- (United States) A Krajicek
- (Croatia) F Škugor
5
4

4
(Spain) M Granollers
(Argentina) H Zeballos
4
7^{9}
[10]

(Canada) F Auger-Aliassime
(Canada) M Raonic
7
6

- (Canada) F Auger-Aliassime
- (Canada) M Raonic
6
4
[3]

WC
- (Italy) G Mager
- (Italy) A Seppi
3
2

4
(Spain) M Granollers
(Argentina) H Zeballos
4
6
[10]

4
(Spain) M Granollers
(Argentina) H Zeballos
6
6

4
(Spain) M Granollers
(Argentina) H Zeballos
7^{7}
7^{7}

6
- (Germany) K Krawietz
- (Germany) A Mies
7
3
[8]

- (Australia) J Peers
- (New Zealand) M Venus
6^{4}
6^{5}

(Finland) H Kontinen
(Germany) J-L Struff
5
6
[10]

- (Finland) H Kontinen
- (Germany) J-L Struff
6^{4}
6
[12]

- (United Kingdom) J Murray
- (United Kingdom) N Skupski
3
5

(Australia) J Peers
(New Zealand) M Venus
7^{7}
3
[14]

(Australia) J Peers
(New Zealand) M Venus
6
7

(Australia) J Peers
(New Zealand) M Venus
6
3
[10]

- (Russia) K Khachanov
- (Russia) A Rublev
4
5

WC
- (Italy) L Sonego
- (Italy) A Vavassori
3
6
[7]

(Serbia) N Ćaćić
(Serbia) D Lajović
6
7

- (Serbia) N Ćaćić
- (Serbia) D Lajović
4
4

WC
(Italy) L Sonego
(Italy) A Vavassori
4
7^{7}
[10]

WC
(Italy) L Sonego
(Italy) A Vavassori
6
6

2
- (United States) R Ram
- (United Kingdom) J Salisbury
6
6^{3}
[7]
