= 2020 Internationaux de Strasbourg =

- Date: 20 – 26 September
- Edition: 34th
- Category: WTA International tournaments
- Draw: 32S / 16D
- Prize money: $225,500
- Surface: Clay
- Location: Strasbourg, France
- Venue: Tennis Club de Strasbourg

Champions

Singles
- (Ukraine) Elina Svitolina

Doubles
- (United States) Nicole Melichar / (Netherlands) Demi Schuurs
← 2019 ·	Internationaux de Strasbourg	· 2021 →

The 2020 Internationaux de Strasbourg was a professional tennis tournament played on clay courts. It was the 34th edition of the tournament and part of the International-level tournament category of the 2020 WTA Tour. It took place at the Tennis Club de Strasbourg in Strasbourg, France, between 20 and 26 September 2020.

== Points and prize money ==
Event	W	F	SF	QF	Round of 16	Round of 32	Q	Q1
Women's singles	280	180	110	60	30	1	18	1
Women's doubles	280	180	110	60	1	—	—	—

=== Prize money ===
Event	W	F	SF	QF	Round of 16	Round of 32	Q1
Women's singles	€20,161	€11,290	€6,214	€4,153	€3,347	€2,621	€1,613
Women's doubles	€7,258	€4,032	€2,524	€1,588	€1,250	—	—

== Singles main draw entrants ==
=== Seeds ===
Country	Player	Rank^{1}	Seed
~~CZE~~	~~Karolína Plíšková~~	~~4~~	~~1~~
UKR	Elina Svitolina	6	2
NED	Kiki Bertens	8	3
BLR	Aryna Sabalenka	12	4
KAZ	Elena Rybakina	18	5
USA	Amanda Anisimova	27	6
RUS	Ekaterina Alexandrova	31	7
USA	Sloane Stephens	33	8

- Rankings are as of September 14, 2020.

=== Other entrants ===
The following players received wildcards into the singles main draw:

- (Netherlands) Kiki Bertens
- (France) Clara Burel
- (France) Pauline Parmentier

The following player received entry into the singles main draw using a protected ranking:

- (Ukraine) Kateryna Bondarenko

The following players received entry from the qualifying draw:

- (United States) Christina McHale
- (Belgium) Greet Minnen
- (Australia) Ellen Perez
- (China) Zhang Shuai

The following players received entry as a lucky loser:

- (France) Myrtille Georges
- (Australia) Storm Sanders

=== Withdrawals ===
- (United States) Jennifer Brady → replaced by (Slovenia) Polona Hercog
- (Germany) Julia Görges → replaced by (Belgium) Alison Van Uytvanck
- (United States) Sofia Kenin → replaced by (France) Alizé Cornet
- (Estonia) Anett Kontaveit → replaced by (Czech Republic) Kateřina Siniaková
- (Russia) Veronika Kudermetova → replaced by (United States) Lauren Davis
- (Czech Republic) Karolína Plíšková → replaced by (Ukraine) Kateryna Bondarenko
- (Kazakhstan) Yulia Putintseva → replaced by (Russia) Anna Blinkova
- (United States) Alison Riske → replaced by (Switzerland) Jil Teichmann
- (Latvia) Anastasija Sevastova → replaced by (Australia) Ajla Tomljanović
- (Czech Republic) Barbora Strýcová → replaced by (France) Myrtille Georges
- (Czech Republic) Markéta Vondroušová → replaced by (Kazakhstan) Zarina Diyas
- (China) Zheng Saisai → replaced by (Australia) Storm Sanders

== Doubles main draw entrants ==
=== Seeds ===
Country	Player	Country	Player	Rank^{1}	Seed
USA	Nicole Melichar	NED	Demi Schuurs	24	1
CAN	Gabriela Dabrowski	LAT	Jeļena Ostapenko	27	2
JPN	Shuko Aoyama	JPN	Ena Shibahara	50	3
USA	Hayley Carter	BRA	Luisa Stefani	75	4

- ^{1} Rankings as of August 17, 2020.

=== Other entrants ===
The following pair received a wildcard into the doubles main draw:

- (France) Clara Burel / (France) Diane Parry

The following pair received entry using a protected ranking:

- (Ukraine) Kateryna Bondarenko / (Canada) Sharon Fichman

=== Withdrawals ===
- (Belgium) Alison Van Uytvanck

== Finals ==
=== Singles ===
- (Ukraine) Elina Svitolina def. (Kazakhstan) Elena Rybakina, 6–4, 1–6, 6–2.

This was Svitolina's 15th WTA Tour singles title, and second of the year.

=== Doubles ===
- (United States) Nicole Melichar / (Netherlands) Demi Schuurs def. (United States) Hayley Carter / (Brazil) Luisa Stefani, 6–4, 6–3.

This was Melichar's 8th career WTA doubles title, and second of the year, and was Schuurs' 12th career WTA doubles title, and second of the year. This was their first title as a pair.
