= 2020 Adelaide International – Women's singles =

Women's singles
- 2020 Adelaide International

Final
- Champion: (Australia) Ashleigh Barty
- Runner-up: (Ukraine) Dayana Yastremska
- Score: 6–2, 7–5

Details
- Draw: 30 (6 Q / 4 WC )
- Seeds: 8

Events
Singles	men	women
Doubles	men	women
- Adelaide International

This was the first edition of the event.

Ashleigh Barty won the title, defeating Dayana Yastremska in the final, 6–2, 7–5.

== Seeds ==
The top two seeds received a bye into the second round.

1. (Australia) Ashleigh Barty (champion)
2. (Romania) Simona Halep (quarterfinals)
3. (Czech Republic) Petra Kvitová (withdrew)
4. (Switzerland) Belinda Bencic (quarterfinals)
5. (Netherlands) Kiki Bertens (withdrew)
6. (Belarus) Aryna Sabalenka (semifinals)
7. (United States) Sofia Kenin (second round)
8. (Czech Republic) Markéta Vondroušová (quarterfinals)
9. (Germany) Angelique Kerber (second round)

== Draw ==
=== Finals ===
Semi-finals
1	(Australia) Ashleigh Barty	3	6	7^{7}
(United States) Danielle Collins	6	1	6^{5}
(Ukraine) Dayana Yastremska	6	7^{7}
6/WC	(Belarus) Aryna Sabalenka	4	6^{4}

Final
1	(Australia) Ashleigh Barty	6	7
(Ukraine) Dayana Yastremska	2	5

=== Top half ===
First round
(Russia) A Pavlyuchenkova	6	6
(Estonia) A Kontaveit	2	4
Q	(Australia) Ar Rodionova	6	6
(United States) S Stephens	2	2
LL	(Germany) T Maria	3	0
8	(Czech Republic) M Vondroušová	6	6
4/WC	(Switzerland) B Bencic	6	6
Q	(Russia) D Kasatkina	4	4
(Germany) J Görges	7^{9}	6
WC	(Australia) P Hon	6^{7}	3
(United States) D Collins	6	6
Q	(Belarus) A Sasnovich	3	2
Q	(Switzerland) V Golubic	0	4
7	(United States) S Kenin	6	6

Second round
1	(Australia) A Barty	4	6	7
(Russia) A Pavlyuchenkova	6	3	5
Q	(Australia) Ar Rodionova	0	0
8	(Czech Republic) M Vondroušová	6	6
4/WC	(Switzerland) B Bencic	7^{8}	7^{7}
(Germany) J Görges	6^{6}	6^{4}
(United States) D Collins	6	6
7	(United States) S Kenin	3	1

Quarter-finals
1	(Australia) A Barty	6	6
8	(Czech Republic) M Vondroušová	3	3
4/WC	(Switzerland) B Bencic	3	1
(United States) D Collins	6	6

Semi-finals
1	(Australia) A Barty	3	6	7^{7}
(United States) D Collins	6	1	6^{5}

=== Bottom half ===
First round
LL	(Russia) V Diatchenko	5	2
(Greece) M Sakkari	7	6
(Latvia) A Sevastova	6	1	3
(Croatia) D Vekić	4	6	6
(Ukraine) D Yastremska	7	6
LL	(Hungary) T Babos	5	3
(China) Q Wang	1	3
9	(Germany) A Kerber	6	6
6/WC	(Belarus) A Sabalenka	5	6	7
(Chinese Taipei) S-w Hsieh	7	1	5
Q	(United States) B Pera	7^{8}	6
(Czech Republic) B Strýcová	6^{6}	3
Q	(Kazakhstan) Y Putintseva	6^{4}	2
WC	(Australia) A Tomljanović	7^{7}	6

Second round
(Greece) M Sakkari	6	5	1
(Croatia) D Vekić	2	7	6
(Ukraine) D Yastremska	6	2
9	(Germany) A Kerber	3	0^{r}
6/WC	(Belarus) A Sabalenka	7^{7}	6
Q	(United States) B Pera	6^{4}	2
WC	(Australia) A Tomljanović	4	5
2	(Romania) S Halep	6	7

Quarter-finals
(Croatia) D Vekić	4	3
(Ukraine) D Yastremska	6	6
6/WC	(Belarus) A Sabalenka	6	6
2	(Romania) S Halep	4	2

Semi-finals
(Ukraine) D Yastremska	6	7^{7}
6/WC	(Belarus) A Sabalenka	4	6^{4}

== Qualifying ==
=== Seeds ===
1. (Kazakhstan) Yulia Putintseva (qualified)
2. (Spain) Carla Suárez Navarro (first round)
3. (United States) Bernarda Pera (qualified)
4. (Belarus) Aliaksandra Sasnovich (qualified)
5. (Russia) Daria Kasatkina (qualified)
6. (Switzerland) Viktorija Golubic (qualified)
7. (Germany) Tatjana Maria (qualifying competition; lucky loser)
8. (Hungary) Tímea Babos (qualifying competition; lucky loser)
9. (Russia) Vitalia Diatchenko (qualifying competition; lucky loser)
10. (Italy) Jasmine Paolini (first round)
11. (Russia) Anastasia Potapova (qualifying competition)
12. (France) Pauline Parmentier (first round)

=== Qualifiers ===
1. (Kazakhstan) Yulia Putintseva
2. (Australia) Arina Rodionova
3. (United States) Bernarda Pera
4. (Belarus) Aliaksandra Sasnovich
5. (Russia) Daria Kasatkina
6. (Switzerland) Viktorija Golubic

=== Lucky losers ===
1. (Germany) Tatjana Maria
2. (Hungary) Tímea Babos
3. (Russia) Vitalia Diatchenko

=== Qualifying draw ===
==== First qualifier ====
First round
1	(Kazakhstan) Yulia Putintseva	6	6
(Japan) Ena Shibahara	3	4
WC	(Australia) Charlotte Kempenaers-Pocz	6^{9}	3
9	(Russia) Vitalia Diatchenko	7^{11}	6

Qualifying competition
1	(Kazakhstan) Yulia Putintseva	6	6
9	(Russia) Vitalia Diatchenko	1	4

==== Second qualifier ====
First round
2	(Spain) Carla Suárez Navarro	6	4	4
(Australia) Arina Rodionova	4	6	6
WC	(Australia) Amber Marshall	3	2
11	(Russia) Anastasia Potapova	6	6

Qualifying competition
(Australia) Arina Rodionova	6	1	6
11	(Russia) Anastasia Potapova	2	6	2

==== Third qualifier ====
First round
3	(United States) Bernarda Pera	6	6
(United Kingdom) Katie Boulter	4	3
PR	(United States) CoCo Vandeweghe	6	6
10	(Italy) Jasmine Paolini	3	4

Qualifying competition
3	(United States) Bernarda Pera	7^{7}	2	7
PR	(United States) CoCo Vandeweghe	6^{5}	6	5

==== Fourth qualifier ====
First round
4	(Belarus) Aliaksandra Sasnovich	6	4	6
(Japan) Shuko Aoyama	1	6	4
(South Korea) Han Na-lae	1	6^{2}
7	(Germany) Tatjana Maria	6	7^{7}

Qualifying competition
4	(Belarus) Aliaksandra Sasnovich	7^{7}	6
7	(Germany) Tatjana Maria	6^{3}	0

==== Fifth qualifier ====
First round
5	(Russia) Daria Kasatkina	3	6	6
WC	(United Kingdom) Amarni Banks	6	1	3
(Canada) Gabriela Dabrowski	6	6
12	(France) Pauline Parmentier	2	1

Qualifying competition
5	(Russia) Daria Kasatkina	6	6
(Canada) Gabriela Dabrowski	2	2

==== Sixth qualifier ====
First round
6	(Switzerland) Viktorija Golubic	6	6
WC	(Australia) Alana Parnaby	4	2
(Sweden) Mirjam Björklund	3	1
8	(Hungary) Tímea Babos	6	6

Qualifying competition
6	(Switzerland) Viktorija Golubic	6	6^{4}	6
8	(Hungary) Tímea Babos	4	7^{7}	4
