= 2020 Internationaux de Strasbourg – Singles =

Singles
- 2020 Internationaux de Strasbourg

Final
- Champion: (Ukraine) Elina Svitolina
- Runner-up: (Kazakhstan) Elena Rybakina
- Score: 6–4, 1–6, 6–2

Events
Singles	Doubles
- Internationaux de Strasbourg

Dayana Yastremska was the defending champion but chose not to defend her title.

Elina Svitolina won the title, defeating Elena Rybakina in the final, 6–4, 1–6, 6–2.

== Seeds ==
The top two seeds that played received a bye into the second round

1. (Czech Republic) Karolína Plíšková (withdrew)
2. (Ukraine) Elina Svitolina (champion)
3. (Netherlands) Kiki Bertens (second round, retired)
4. (Belarus) Aryna Sabalenka (semifinals)
5. (Kazakhstan) Elena Rybakina (final)
6. (United States) Amanda Anisimova (first round)
7. (Russia) Ekaterina Alexandrova (second round)
8. (United States) Sloane Stephens (first round)

== Draw ==
Key

- Q = Qualifier
- WC = Wild card
- LL = Lucky loser
- Alt = Alternate
- ITF = ITF entry
- PR = Protected ranking
- SR = Special ranking
- SE = Special exempt
- JE = Junior exempt
- JR = Junior Accelerator Programme entrant
- CO = College Accelerator Programme entrant
- NG = Next Gen Accelerator Program entrant
- w/o = Walkover
- r = Retired
- d = Defaulted

=== Finals ===
Semifinals
(Japan) Nao Hibino	3	4
5	(Kazakhstan) Elena Rybakina	6	6
4	(Belarus) Aryna Sabalenka	2	6	4
2	(Ukraine) Elina Svitolina	6	4	6

Final
5	(Kazakhstan) Elena Rybakina	4	6	2
2	(Ukraine) Elina Svitolina	6	1	6

=== Top half ===
First round
(United States) L Davis	2	3
(Latvia) J Ostapenko	6	6
(Kazakhstan) Z Diyas	6^{4}	7	7^{7}
Q	(United States) C McHale	7^{7}	5	6^{3}
(Japan) N Hibino	6	3	6
8	(United States) S Stephens	2	6	1
PR	(Ukraine) K Bondarenko	6	1	4
WC	(France) C Burel	3	6	6
(Australia) A Tomljanović	6	4	2
Q	(China) S Zhang	3	6	6
(Slovenia) P Hercog	3	4
(France) A Cornet	6	6
Q	(Belgium) G Minnen	5	4
5	(Kazakhstan) E Rybakina	7	6

Second round
3/WC	(Netherlands) K Bertens	6	4	2^{r}
(Latvia) J Ostapenko	2	6	4
(Kazakhstan) Z Diyas	5	3
(Japan) N Hibino	7	6
WC	(France) C Burel	3	6^{3}
Q	(China) S Zhang	6	7^{7}
(France) A Cornet	3	6^{8}
5	(Kazakhstan) E Rybakina	6	7^{10}

Quarterfinals
(Latvia) J Ostapenko	6^{2}	6^{4}
(Japan) N Hibino	7^{7}	7^{7}
Q	(China) S Zhang	3	2
5	(Kazakhstan) E Rybakina	6	6

Semifinals
(Japan) N Hibino	3	4
5	(Kazakhstan) E Rybakina	6	6

=== Bottom half ===
First round
7	(Russia) E Alexandrova	6	6
LL	(Australia) S Sanders	1	0
(Czech Republic) K Siniaková	4	7^{7}	6
(United States) B Pera	6	6^{3}	1
(Russia) A Blinkova	6	6
LL	(France) M Georges	1	2
Q	(Australia) E Perez	4	3
4	(Belarus) A Sabalenka	6	6
6	(United States) A Anisimova	2	3
(Switzerland) J Teichmann	6	6
(Russia) A Pavlyuchenkova	6	7
(Belgium) A Van Uytvanck	3	5
(Poland) M Linette	6	6
WC	(France) P Parmentier	4	3

Second round
7	(Russia) E Alexandrova	2	4
(Czech Republic) K Siniaková	6	6
(Russia) A Blinkova	6	4	2
4	(Belarus) A Sabalenka	1	6	6
(Switzerland) J Teichmann	7^{7}	7
(Russia) A Pavlyuchenkova	6^{3}	5
(Poland) M Linette	6^{0}	5
2	(Ukraine) E Svitolina	7^{7}	7

Quarterfinals
(Czech Republic) K Siniaková	6	3	3
4	(Belarus) A Sabalenka	2	6	6
(Switzerland) J Teichmann	4	3
2	(Ukraine) E Svitolina	6	6

Semifinals
4	(Belarus) A Sabalenka	2	6	4
2	(Ukraine) E Svitolina	6	4	6

== Qualifying ==
=== Seeds ===
1. (China) Zhang Shuai (qualified)
2. (United States) Christina McHale (qualified)
3. (Belgium) Greet Minnen (qualified)
4. (Australia) Ellen Perez (qualified)
5. (Australia) Storm Sanders (qualifying competition, lucky loser)
6. (Ukraine) Kateryna Bondarenko (moved to main draw)
7. (France) Diane Parry (qualifying competition)
8. (Czech Republic) Michaela Bayerlová (qualifying competition)

=== Qualifiers ===
1. (China) Zhang Shuai
2. (United States) Christina McHale
3. (Belgium) Greet Minnen
4. (Australia) Ellen Perez

=== Lucky losers ===
1. (France) Myrtille Georges
2. (Australia) Storm Sanders

=== Draw ===
==== First qualifier ====
Qualifying competition
1	(China) Zhang Shuai	7^{8}	3	6
5	(Australia) Storm Sanders	6^{6}	6	0

==== Second qualifier ====
Qualifying competition
2	(United States) Christina McHale	6	6
Alt	(France) Myrtille Georges	4	1

==== Third qualifier ====
Qualifying competition
3	(Belgium) Greet Minnen	6	6
8/WC	(Czech Republic) Michaela Bayerlová	2	2

==== Fourth qualifier ====
Qualifying competition
4	(Australia) Ellen Perez	6	6
7/WC	(France) Diane Parry	2	3
