= 2020 Top Seed Open – Singles =

Singles
- 2020 Top Seed Open

Final
- Champion: (United States) Jennifer Brady
- Runner-up: (Switzerland) Jil Teichmann
- Score: 6–3, 6–4

Details
- Draw: 32 (6 Q / 4 WC )
- Seeds: 8

Events
| Singles | Doubles |
- Lexington Challenger

Jennifer Brady defeated Jil Teichmann in the final, 6–3, 6–4 to win the singles tennis title at the 2020 Top Seed Open. Brady did not drop a set, or face a tiebreak in any set, en route to her first WTA Tour singles title.

Kim Da-bin was the reigning champion from 2019, when the event was a $60k event. However, she was unable to participate due to insufficient ranking and travel restrictions resulting from the COVID-19 pandemic.

The second-round match between Serena and Venus Williams marked their 31st and final professional encounter, with Serena winning to end their head-to-head at 19–12 in her favor. It marked the first time that two players faced each other in four different decades, and the longest gap between the first and last meetings between two players (22 years and 7 months).

With her quarterfinal win over Serena Williams, Shelby Rogers became only the fourth player ranked outside the top 100 and the first since Virginie Razzano at the 2012 French Open to defeat Williams in a main-draw match.

== Seeds ==
1. (United States) Serena Williams (quarterfinals)
2. (Belarus) Aryna Sabalenka (second round)
3. (United Kingdom) Johanna Konta (first round)
4. (United States) ~~Amanda Anisimova~~ (withdrew)
5. (Kazakhstan) Yulia Putintseva (second round)
6. (Poland) Magda Linette (second round)
7. (United States) Sloane Stephens (first round)
8. (Tunisia) Ons Jabeur (quarterfinals)

== Draw ==
Key

- Q = Qualifier
- WC = Wild card
- LL = Lucky loser
- Alt = Alternate
- ITF = ITF entry
- PR = Protected ranking
- SR = Special ranking
- SE = Special exempt
- JE = Junior exempt
- JR = Junior Accelerator Programme entrant
- CO = College Accelerator Programme entrant
- NG = Next Gen Accelerator Program entrant
- w/o = Walkover
- r = Retired
- d = Defaulted

=== Finals ===
Semifinals
WC | (United States) Shelby Rogers | 3 | 2
(Switzerland) Jil Teichmann | 6 | 6
(United States) Jennifer Brady | 6 | 6
(United States) Coco Gauff | 2 | 4

Final
(Switzerland) Jil Teichmann | 3 | 4
(United States) Jennifer Brady | 6 | 6

=== Top half ===
First round
1 | (United States) S Williams | 4 | 6 | 6
(United States) B Pera | 6 | 4 | 1
(United States) V Williams | 6 | 6
(Belarus) V Azarenka | 3 | 2
WC | (United States) S Rogers | 6 | 4 | 6
(Japan) M Doi | 4 | 6 | 2
Q | (Canada) LA Fernandez | 6 | 6
7 | (United States) S Stephens | 3 | 3
LL | (United States) F Di Lorenzo | 1 | 2
PR | (United States) C Bellis | 6 | 6
(United States) J Pegula | 6 | 5 | 6
WC | (Russia) V Zvonareva | 1 | 7 | 4
Q | (Russia) A Kalinskaya | 2 | 5
(Switzerland) J Teichmann | 6 | 7
(Australia) A Tomljanović | 0 | 4
5 | (Kazakhstan) Y Putintseva | 6 | 6

Second round
1 | (United States) S Williams | 3 | 6 | 6
(United States) V Williams | 6 | 3 | 4
WC | (United States) S Rogers | 6 | 7
Q | (Canada) LA Fernandez | 2 | 5
PR | (United States) C Bellis | 6 | 6
(United States) J Pegula | 3 | 2
(Switzerland) J Teichmann | 6 | 6
5 | (Kazakhstan) Y Putintseva | 2 | 2

Quarterfinals
1 | (United States) S Williams | 6 | 4 | 6^{5}
WC | (United States) S Rogers | 1 | 6 | 7^{7}
PR | (United States) C Bellis | 2 | 4
(Switzerland) J Teichmann | 6 | 6

Semifinals
WC | (United States) S Rogers | 3 | 2
(Switzerland) J Teichmann | 6 | 6

=== Bottom half ===
First round
6 | (Poland) M Linette | 6 | 6
(United States) L Davis | 2 | 3
(United States) J Brady | 6 | 6
(United Kingdom) H Watson | 2 | 1
Q | (United States) K Ahn | 6 | 4 | 1^{r}
(Russia) A Blinkova | 2 | 6 | 3
(Czech Republic) M Bouzková | 6 | 6
3 | (United Kingdom) J Konta | 4 | 4
8 | (Tunisia) O Jabeur | 6 | 6
WC | (United States) C McNally | 2 | 4
Q | (Belarus) O Govortsova | 7^{7} | 6
Q | (United States) B Mattek-Sands | 6^{4} | 1
Q | (United States) C Dolehide | 5 | 5
(United States) C Gauff | 7 | 7
(United States) M Brengle | 1 | 7^{7} | 2
2 | (Belarus) A Sabalenka | 6 | 6^{5} | 6

Second round
6 | (Poland) M Linette | 2 | 3
(United States) J Brady | 6 | 6
(Russia) A Blinkova | 4 | 2
(Czech Republic) M Bouzková | 6 | 6
8 | (Tunisia) O Jabeur | 3 | 6 | 6
Q | (Belarus) O Govortsova | 6 | 2 | 4
(United States) C Gauff | 7^{7} | 4 | 6
2 | (Belarus) A Sabalenka | 6^{4} | 6 | 4

Quarterfinals
(United States) J Brady | 6 | 6
(Czech Republic) M Bouzková | 1 | 2
8 | (Tunisia) O Jabeur | 6 | 4 | 1
(United States) C Gauff | 4 | 6 | 6

Semifinals
(United States) J Brady | 6 | 6
(United States) C Gauff | 2 | 4

== Qualifying ==
=== Seeds ===
1. (United States) Kristie Ahn (qualified)
2. (Russia) Margarita Gasparyan (first round)
3. (Russia) Anna Kalinskaya (qualified)
4. (Canada) Leylah Annie Fernandez (qualified)
5. (United States) Francesca Di Lorenzo (qualifying competition, lucky loser)
6. (United States) Ann Li (first round)
7. (United States) Caroline Dolehide (qualified)
8. (Belarus) Olga Govortsova (qualified)
9. (United States) Usue Maitane Arconada (qualifying competition)
10. (Australia) Arina Rodionova (qualifying competition)
11. (Japan) Mayo Hibi (first round)
12. (United States) Varvara Lepchenko (first round)

=== Qualifiers ===
1. (United States) Kristie Ahn
2. (United States) Caroline Dolehide
3. (Russia) Anna Kalinskaya
4. (Canada) Leylah Annie Fernandez
5. (Belarus) Olga Govortsova
6. (United States) Bethanie Mattek-Sands

=== Lucky loser ===
1. (United States) Francesca Di Lorenzo

=== Qualifying draw ===
==== First qualifier ====
First round
1 | (United States) Kristie Ahn | 7^{7} | 2 | 7
(Romania) Gabriela Talabă | 6^{4} | 6 | 5
(Serbia) Jovana Jović | 7^{7} | 7^{7}
11 | (Japan) Mayo Hibi | 6^{4} | 6^{4}

Qualifying competition
1 | (United States) Kristie Ahn | 2 | 6 | 6
(Serbia) Jovana Jović | 6 | 4 | 2

==== Second qualifier ====
First round
2 | (Russia) Margarita Gasparyan | 6^{5} | 4
WC | (United States) Jamie Loeb | 7^{7} | 6
(Ukraine) Kateryna Bondarenko | 3 | 6 | 2
7 | (United States) Caroline Dolehide | 6 | 4 | 6

Qualifying competition
WC | (United States) Jamie Loeb | 2 | 5
7 | (United States) Caroline Dolehide | 6 | 7

==== Third qualifier ====
First round
3 | (Russia) Anna Kalinskaya | 6 | 6
WC | (United States) Quinn Gleason | 1 | 0
(United States) Hailey Baptiste | 5 | 2
9 | (United States) Usue Maitane Arconada | 7 | 6

Qualifying competition
3 | (Russia) Anna Kalinskaya | 3 | 6 | 6
9 | (United States) Usue Maitane Arconada | 6 | 4 | 4

==== Fourth qualifier ====
First round
4 | (Canada) Leylah Annie Fernandez | 6 | 6
(Mexico) Renata Zarazúa | 4 | 1
(United States) Catherine Harrison | 6 | 3 | 2
10 | (Australia) Arina Rodionova | 4 | 6 | 6

Qualifying competition
4 | (Canada) Leylah Annie Fernandez | 6 | 6
10 | (Australia) Arina Rodionova | 2 | 3

==== Fifth qualifier ====
First round
5 | (United States) Francesca Di Lorenzo | 6 | 5 | 7^{7}
(United States) Claire Liu | 3 | 7 | 6^{5}
WC | (United States) Katie Volynets | 6 | 1 | 2
8 | (Belarus) Olga Govortsova | 3 | 6 | 6

Qualifying competition
5 | (United States) Francesca Di Lorenzo | 1 | 2
8 | (Belarus) Olga Govortsova | 6 | 6

==== Sixth qualifier ====
First round
6 | (United States) Ann Li | 6^{2} | 5
(United States) Robin Anderson | 7^{7} | 7
WC | (United States) Bethanie Mattek-Sands | 6 | 7^{7}
12 | (United States) Varvara Lepchenko | 4 | 6^{5}

Qualifying competition
(United States) Robin Anderson | 3 | 6 | 5
WC | (United States) Bethanie Mattek-Sands | 6 | 4 | 7
