= 2020 Italian Open – Women's doubles =

Women's doubles
- 2020 Italian Open

Final
- Champions: (Chinese Taipei) Hsieh Su-wei (Czech Republic) Barbora Strýcová
- Runners-up: (Germany) Anna-Lena Friedsam (Romania) Raluca Olaru
- Score: 6–2, 6–2

Details
- Draw: 28
- Seeds: 8

Events
Singles	men	women
Doubles	men	women
← 2019 ·	Italian Open	· 2021 →

Victoria Azarenka and Ashleigh Barty are the defending champions but neither player chose to participate.

Hsieh Su-wei and Barbora Strýcová won the title, defeating Anna-Lena Friedsam and Raluca Olaru in the final, 6–2, 6–2.

== Seeds ==
The top four seeds received a bye into the second round.

1. (Chinese Taipei) Hsieh Su-wei / (Czech Republic) Barbora Strýcová (champions)
2. (Hungary) Tímea Babos / (China) Zhang Shuai (second round)
3. (Canada) Gabriela Dabrowski / (Latvia) Jeļena Ostapenko (second round)
4. (United States) Nicole Melichar / (Netherlands) Demi Schuurs (second round)
5. (Belgium) Kirsten Flipkens / (Belgium) Elise Mertens (withdrew)
6. (Russia) Veronika Kudermetova / (Czech Republic) Kateřina Siniaková (quarterfinals)
7. (Japan) Shuko Aoyama / (Japan) Ena Shibahara (semifinals)
8. (United States) Sofia Kenin / (United States) Bethanie Mattek-Sands (first round)

== Draw ==
=== Key ===
- Q = Qualifier
- WC = Wild card
- LL = Lucky loser
- Alt = Alternate
- ITF = ITF entry
- PR = Protected ranking
- SR = Special ranking
- SE = Special exempt
- JE = Junior exempt
- JR = Junior Accelerator Programme entrant
- CO = College Accelerator Programme entrant
- NG = Next Gen Accelerator Program entrant
- w/o = Walkover
- r = Retired
- d = Defaulted

=== Finals ===
Semifinals
1	(Chinese Taipei) Hsieh Su-wei (Czech Republic) Barbora Strýcová	7	6
(United States) Hayley Carter (Brazil) Luisa Stefani	5	4
(Germany) Anna-Lena Friedsam (Romania) Raluca Olaru	3	6	[10]
7	(Japan) Shuko Aoyama (Japan) Ena Shibahara	6	2	[4]

Final
1	(Chinese Taipei) Hsieh Su-wei (Czech Republic) Barbora Strýcová	6	6
(Germany) Anna-Lena Friedsam (Romania) Raluca Olaru	2	2

=== Top half ===
First round
(Japan) N Hibino (Japan) M Ninomiya	1	7	[10]
WC	(Italy) E Cocciaretto (Italy) M Trevisan	6	5	[5]
WC	(Italy) G Gatto-Monticone (Italy) J Paolini	6	6
(Georgia (country)) O Kalashnikova (Germany) L Siegemund	3	4
(United States) K Christian (Mexico) G Olmos	2	3
6	(Russia) V Kudermetova (Czech Republic) K Siniaková	6	6
(Australia) E Perez (Australia) S Sanders	3	6^{2}
(Czech Republic) L Hradecká (Slovenia) A Klepač	6	7^{7}
(United States) H Carter (Brazil) L Stefani	6	7^{7}
(Russia) A Blinkova (Kazakhstan) E Rybakina	4	6^{5}
(Ukraine) L Kichenok (Ukraine) N Kichenok	4	5
Alt	(United States) C Gauff (United States) C McHale	6	7

Second round
1	(Chinese Taipei) S-w Hsieh (Czech Republic) B Strýcová	6	6
(Japan) N Hibino (Japan) M Ninomiya	0	0
WC	(Italy) G Gatto-Monticone (Italy) J Paolini	1	0
6	(Russia) V Kudermetova (Czech Republic) K Siniaková	6	6
3	(Canada) G Dabrowski (Latvia) J Ostapenko	5	3
(Czech Republic) L Hradecká (Slovenia) A Klepač	7	6
(United States) H Carter (Brazil) L Stefani	7^{7}	6
Alt	(United States) C Gauff (United States) C McHale	6^{5}	3

Quarterfinals
1	(Chinese Taipei) S-w Hsieh (Czech Republic) B Strýcová	7^{7}	6
6	(Russia) V Kudermetova (Czech Republic) K Siniaková	6^{5}	4
(Czech Republic) L Hradecká (Slovenia) A Klepač	7^{7}	4	[8]
(United States) H Carter (Brazil) L Stefani	6^{5}	6	[10]

Semifinals
1	(Chinese Taipei) S-w Hsieh (Czech Republic) B Strýcová	7	6
(United States) H Carter (Brazil) L Stefani	5	4

=== Bottom half ===
First round
8	(United States) S Kenin (United States) B Mattek-Sands	1	4
(Germany) A-L Friedsam (Romania) R Olaru	6	6
(Japan) M Kato (United States) S Santamaria	6	3	[10]
(Japan) M Doi (Czech Republic) R Voráčová	4	6	[6]
Alt	(Poland) M Linette (United States) B Pera	6	6
(Chile) A Guarachi (United States) D Krawczyk	2	4
7	(Japan) S Aoyama (Japan) E Shibahara	6	6
(Netherlands) K Bertens (Netherlands) A Rus	3	4
(Romania) S Halep (Romania) M Niculescu	6	6
(Ukraine) E Svitolina (Ukraine) D Yastremska	0	1
(United States) A Muhammad (Australia) Ar Rodionova	6	6
PR	(Canada) S Fichman (Russia) V Zvonareva	4	4

Second round
(Germany) A-L Friedsam (Romania) R Olaru	6	6
(Japan) M Kato (United States) S Santamaria	4	3
Alt	(Poland) M Linette (United States) B Pera	6	6
4	(United States) N Melichar (Netherlands) D Schuurs	2	2
7	(Japan) S Aoyama (Japan) E Shibahara	6	6
(Romania) S Halep (Romania) M Niculescu	1	3
(United States) A Muhammad (Australia) Ar Rodionova	6	2	[10]
2	(Hungary) T Babos (China) S Zhang	4	6	[5]

Quarterfinals
(Germany) A-L Friedsam (Romania) R Olaru	5	7^{7}	[10]
Alt	(Poland) M Linette (United States) B Pera	7	6^{4}	[8]
7	(Japan) S Aoyama (Japan) E Shibahara	6	6
(United States) A Muhammad (Australia) Ar Rodionova	0	3

Semifinals
(Germany) A-L Friedsam (Romania) R Olaru	3	6	[10]
7	(Japan) S Aoyama (Japan) E Shibahara	6	2	[4]
