= 2020 Italian Open – Women's singles =

Women's singles
- 2020 Italian Open

Final
- Champion: (Romania) Simona Halep
- Runner-up: (Czech Republic) Karolína Plíšková
- Score: 6–0, 2–1, ret.

Details
- Draw: 56 (8 Q / 5 WC )
- Seeds: 16

Events
Singles	men	women
Doubles	men	women
- Italian Open

Simona Halep won the women's singles tennis title at the 2020 Italian Open after the defending champion Karolína Plíšková retired from the final, with the scoreline at 6–0, 2–1. It was her first Italian Open title.

Sofia Kenin became the first top five player and reigning major champion to be defeated by a 'double bagel' (6–0, 6–0) scoreline since Lindsay Davenport defeated Maria Sharapova at the 2005 Indian Wells tournament. Kenin was defeated by Victoria Azarenka in the second round.

== Seeds ==
The top eight seeds received a bye into the second round.

1. (Romania) Simona Halep (champion)
2. (Czech Republic) Karolína Plíšková (final, retired)
3. (United States) Sofia Kenin (second round)
4. (Ukraine) Elina Svitolina (quarterfinals)
5. (Netherlands) Kiki Bertens (second round)
6. (Switzerland) Belinda Bencic (second round)
7. (United Kingdom) Johanna Konta (third round)
8. (Croatia) Petra Martić (second round)

9. (Spain) Garbiñe Muguruza (semifinals)
10. (Kazakhstan) Elena Rybakina (third round)
11. (Belgium) Elise Mertens (quarterfinals)
12. (Czech Republic) Markéta Vondroušová (semifinals)
13. (United States) Alison Riske (first round)
14. (Estonia) Anett Kontaveit (second round)
15. (Germany) Angelique Kerber (first round)
16. (Croatia) Donna Vekić (first round)

Click on the seed number of a player to go to their draw section.

== Draw ==
Key

- Q = Qualifier
- WC = Wild card
- LL = Lucky loser
- Alt = Alternate
- ITF = ITF entry
- PR = Protected ranking
- SR = Special ranking
- SE = Special exempt
- JE = Junior exempt
- JR = Junior Accelerator Programme entrant
- CO = College Accelerator Programme entrant
- NG = Next Gen Accelerator Program entrant
- w/o = Walkover
- r = Retired
- d = Defaulted

=== Finals ===
Quarterfinals
1	(Romania) Simona Halep	6	2
(Kazakhstan) Yulia Putintseva	2	0^{r}
SE	(Belarus) Victoria Azarenka	6	3	4
9	(Spain) Garbiñe Muguruza	3	6	6
12	(Czech Republic) Markéta Vondroušová	6	6
4	(Ukraine) Elina Svitolina	3	0
11	(Belgium) Elise Mertens	3	6	0
2	(Czech Republic) Karolína Plíšková	6	3	6

Semifinals
1	(Romania) Simona Halep	6	4	6
9	(Spain) Garbiñe Muguruza	3	6	4
12	(Czech Republic) Markéta Vondroušová	2	4
2	(Czech Republic) Karolína Plíšková	6	6

Final
1	(Romania) Simona Halep	6	2
2	(Czech Republic) Karolína Plíšková	0	1^{r}

=== Top half ===
==== Section 1 ====
First round
(Latvia) A Sevastova	2	3
WC	(Italy) J Paolini	6	6
WC	(Italy) C Giorgi	5	7^{7}	4
(Ukraine) D Yastremska	7	6^{5}	6
(United States) A Anisimova	7^{7}	7^{8}
16	(Croatia) D Vekić	6^{4}	6^{6}
10	(Kazakhstan) E Rybakina	6	6
(Russia) E Alexandrova	0	4
(Czech Republic) M Bouzková	6	6
(Australia) A Tomljanović	3	4
(Kazakhstan) Y Putintseva	6	6
(Sweden) R Peterson	2	4

Second round
1	(Romania) S Halep	6	6
WC	(Italy) J Paolini	3	4
(Ukraine) D Yastremska	4	7^{7}	6
(United States) A Anisimova	6	6^{3}	4
10	(Kazakhstan) E Rybakina	7	7^{7}
(Czech Republic) M Bouzková	5	6^{3}
(Kazakhstan) Y Putintseva	6	6^{2}	6
8	(Croatia) P Martić	3	7^{7}	4

Third round
1	(Romania) S Halep	7	6
(Ukraine) D Yastremska	5	4
10	(Kazakhstan) E Rybakina	6	6^{3}	2
(Kazakhstan) Y Putintseva	4	7^{7}	6

Quarterfinals
1	(Romania) S Halep	6	2
(Kazakhstan) Y Putintseva	2	0^{r}

==== Section 2 ====
First round
SE	(Belarus) V Azarenka	7^{9}	6
WC	(United States) V Williams	6^{7}	2
Q	(Russia) D Kasatkina	6	6
WC	(Russia) V Zvonareva	2	2
(Czech Republic) K Siniaková	6	6
15	(Germany) A Kerber	3	1
9	(Spain) G Muguruza	6	6
(United States) S Stephens	3	3
(Tunisia) O Jabeur	4	3
(United States) C Gauff	6	6
WC	(Italy) E Cocciaretto	2	2
Q	(Romania) I-C Begu	6	6

Second round
3	(United States) S Kenin	0	0
SE	(Belarus) V Azarenka	6	6
Q	(Russia) D Kasatkina	6	6
(Czech Republic) K Siniaková	2	3
9	(Spain) G Muguruza	7^{7}	3	6
(United States) C Gauff	6^{3}	6	3
Q	(Romania) I-C Begu	0	4
7	(United Kingdom) J Konta	6	6

Third round
SE	(Belarus) V Azarenka	6
Q	(Russia) D Kasatkina	6^{r}
9	(Spain) G Muguruza	6	6
7	(United Kingdom) J Konta	4	1

Quarterfinals
SE	(Belarus) V Azarenka	6	3	4
9	(Spain) G Muguruza	3	6	6

=== Bottom half ===
==== Section 3 ====
First round
Q	(Slovenia) K Juvan	6	4	1
(Slovenia) P Hercog	4	6	6
(Poland) I Świątek	6^{5}	3
Q	(Netherlands) A Rus	7^{7}	6
Q	(Japan) M Doi	1	6	4
12	(Czech Republic) M Vondroušová	6	4	6
14	(Estonia) A Kontaveit	6	7^{7}
(France) C Garcia	3	6^{1}
(United States) B Pera	6	6^{3}	3
(Russia) S Kuznetsova	3	7^{7}	6
(Russia) A Pavlyuchenkova	6	6^{5}	6
(China) S Zhang	4	7^{7}	1

Second round
5	(Netherlands) K Bertens	4	4
(Slovenia) P Hercog	6	6
Q	(Netherlands) A Rus	3	3
12	(Czech Republic) M Vondroušová	6	6
14	(Estonia) A Kontaveit	6	5	3
(Russia) S Kuznetsova	4	7	6
(Russia) A Pavlyuchenkova	3	6^{4}
4	(Ukraine) E Svitolina	6	7^{7}

Third round
(Slovenia) P Hercog	6	1	6^{5}
12	(Czech Republic) M Vondroušová	1	6	7^{7}
(Russia) S Kuznetsova	6^{6}	4
4	(Ukraine) E Svitolina	7^{8}	6

Quarterfinals
12	(Czech Republic) M Vondroušová	6	6
4	(Ukraine) E Svitolina	3	0

==== Section 4 ====
First round
(Germany) J Görges	1	0
Q	(Montenegro) D Kovinić	6	6
(Poland) M Linette	6	6
(Latvia) J Ostapenko	4	3
(Chinese Taipei) S-w Hsieh	3	1
11	(Belgium) E Mertens	6	6
13	(United States) A Riske	7	6^{4}	3
Q	(Spain) A Bolsova	5	7^{7}	6
Q	(Russia) A Blinkova	6	6
(Switzerland) J Teichmann	3	3
(Czech Republic) B Strýcová	6	6
(Russia) V Kudermetova	3	3

Second round
6	(Switzerland) B Bencic	3	1
Q	(Montenegro) D Kovinić	6	6
(Poland) M Linette	2	4
11	(Belgium) E Mertens	6	6
Q	(Spain) A Bolsova	6	1	6^{4}
Q	(Russia) A Blinkova	4	6	7^{7}
(Czech Republic) B Strýcová	3	3
2	(Czech Republic) Ka Plíšková	6	6

Third round
Q	(Montenegro) D Kovinić	4	4
11	(Belgium) E Mertens	6	6
Q	(Russia) A Blinkova	4	3
2	(Czech Republic) Ka Plíšková	6	6

Quarterfinals
11	(Belgium) E Mertens	3	6	0
2	(Czech Republic) Ka Plíšková	6	3	6

== Qualifying ==
=== Seeds ===
1. (United States) Bernarda Pera (moved to main draw)
2. (Russia) Anna Blinkova (qualified)
3. (United States) Lauren Davis (first round)
4. (Netherlands) Arantxa Rus (qualified)
5. (Kazakhstan) Zarina Diyas (first round)
6. (Russia) Daria Kasatkina (qualified)
7. (Romania) Irina-Camelia Begu (qualified)
8. (United States) Christina McHale (first round)
9. (Japan) Nao Hibino (first round)
10. (Japan) Misaki Doi (qualified)
11. (Romania) Patricia Maria Țig (withdrew, still competing in İstanbul)
12. (Montenegro) Danka Kovinić (qualified)
13. (Hungary) Tímea Babos (qualifying competition)
14. (Spain) Aliona Bolsova (qualified)
15. (Canada) Leylah Annie Fernandez (first round)
16. (Germany) Anna-Lena Friedsam (qualifying competition)

=== Qualifiers ===
1. (Japan) Misaki Doi
2. (Russia) Anna Blinkova
3. (Slovenia) Kaja Juvan
4. (Netherlands) Arantxa Rus
5. (Spain) Aliona Bolsova
6. (Russia) Daria Kasatkina
7. (Romania) Irina-Camelia Begu
8. (Montenegro) Danka Kovinić

=== Qualifying draw ===
==== First qualifier ====
First round					Qualifying competition
						Bye
					10	(Japan) Misaki Doi
	(Italy) Martina Trevisan	4	7^{7}	3	10	(Japan) Misaki Doi
10	(Japan) Misaki Doi	6	6^{4}	6

==== Second qualifier ====
First round					Qualifying competition
					2	(Russia) Anna Blinkova	7	6
						(Switzerland) Stefanie Vögele	5	3
	(Switzerland) Stefanie Vögele	2	6	7		(Switzerland) Stefanie Vögele	5	3
15	(Canada) Leylah Fernandez	6	2	5

==== Third qualifier ====
First round
3	(United States) Lauren Davis	4	1
(Slovenia) Kaja Juvan	6	6
WC	(Italy) Melania Delai	4	6	6
9	(Japan) Nao Hibino	6	3	4

Qualifying competition
(Slovenia) Kaja Juvan	6	6
WC	(Italy) Melania Delai	2	3

==== Fourth qualifier ====
First round
4	(Netherlands) Arantxa Rus	6	6
(Russia) Liudmila Samsonova	1	3
(Italy) Giulia Gatto-Monticone	3	6	2
13	(Hungary) Tímea Babos	6	1	6

Qualifying competition
4	(Netherlands) Arantxa Rus	6	6
13	(Hungary) Tímea Babos	0	1

==== Fifth qualifier ====
First round
5	(Kazakhstan) Zarina Diyas	5	6	3
(Russia) Anna Kalinskaya	7	2	6
WC	(Italy) Jessica Pieri	1	1
14	(Spain) Aliona Bolsova	6	6

Qualifying competition
(Russia) Anna Kalinskaya	2	2
14	(Spain) Aliona Bolsova	6	6

==== Sixth qualifier ====
First round				Qualifying competition
6	(Russia) Daria Kasatkina	6	6
	(Australia) Arina Rodionova	0	1
	(Australia) Arina Rodionova	0	1	6	(Russia) Daria Kasatkina	6	6
					(Canada) Gabriela Dabrowski	2	2

==== Seventh qualifier ====
First round
7	(Romania) Irina-Camelia Begu	6	6
(Italy) Sara Errani	1	3
(Italy) Martina Di Giuseppe	3	2
16	(Germany) Anna-Lena Friedsam	6	6

Qualifying competition
7	(Romania) Irina-Camelia Begu	6	6
16	(Germany) Anna-Lena Friedsam	1	1

==== Eighth qualifier ====
First round
8	(United States) Christina McHale	6	4	5
(Poland) Katarzyna Kawa	4	6	7
(Norway) Ulrikke Eikeri	2	1
12	(Montenegro) Danka Kovinić	6	6

Qualifying competition
(Poland) Katarzyna Kawa	6	4	3
12	(Montenegro) Danka Kovinić	3	6	6
