= 2020 Adelaide International – Women's doubles =

Women's doubles
- 2020 Adelaide International

Final
- Champions: (United States) Nicole Melichar (China) Xu Yifan
- Runners-up: (Canada) Gabriela Dabrowski (Croatia) Darija Jurak
- Score: 2–6, 7–5, [10–5]

Details
- Draw: 16
- Seeds: 4

Events
Singles	men	women
Doubles	men	women
- Adelaide International

This was the first edition of the event.

Nicole Melichar and Xu Yifan won the title, defeating Gabriela Dabrowski and Darija Jurak in the final, 2–6, 7–5, [10–5].

== Seeds ==
1. (United States) Nicole Melichar / (China) Xu Yifan (champions)
2. (Czech Republic) Květa Peschke / (Netherlands) Demi Schuurs (quarterfinals)
3. (Canada) Gabriela Dabrowski / (Croatia) Darija Jurak (final)
4. (China) Duan Yingying / (United States) Desirae Krawczyk (first round)

== Draw ==
Key

- Q = Qualifier
- WC = Wild card
- LL = Lucky loser
- Alt = Alternate
- ITF = ITF entry
- PR = Protected ranking
- SR = Special ranking
- SE = Special exempt
- JE = Junior exempt
- JR = Junior Accelerator Programme entrant
- CO = College Accelerator Programme entrant
- NG = Next Gen Accelerator Program entrant
- w/o = Walkover
- r = Retired
- d = Defaulted

=== Draw ===
First round
1	(United States) N Melichar (China) Y Xu	7	6
(United States) D Collins (Poland) A Rosolska	5	1
(Australia) M Adamczak (Slovenia) K Srebotnik	6	0	[5]
(United States) K Christian (Chile) A Guarachi	4	6	[10]
4	(China) Y Duan (United States) D Krawczyk	6^{2}	4
(Japan) S Aoyama (Japan) E Shibahara	7^{7}	6
(United States) S Kenin (United States) B Mattek-Sands	7	6^{4}	[10]
(Switzerland) V Golubic (Belarus) A Sasnovich	5	7^{7}	[5]
(Australia) P Hon (Australia) Ar Rodionova	3	1
(Germany) T Maria (Russia) A Potapova	6	6
(Ukraine) L Kichenok (China) Z Yang	1	3
3	(Canada) G Dabrowski (Croatia) D Jurak	6	6
(Australia) A Bozovic (Australia) A Marshall	1	3
(Czech Republic) L Hradecká (Slovenia) A Klepač	6	6
(Romania) S Halep (Romania) R Olaru	6^{2}	6	[3]
2	(Czech Republic) K Peschke (Netherlands) D Schuurs	7^{7}	4	[10]

Quarter-finals
1	(United States) N Melichar (China) Y Xu	6	7^{11}
(United States) K Christian (Chile) A Guarachi	2	6^{9}
(Japan) S Aoyama (Japan) E Shibahara	6^{5}	6^{3}
(United States) S Kenin (United States) B Mattek-Sands	7^{7}	7^{7}
(Germany) T Maria (Russia) A Potapova	3	7^{8}	[6]
3	(Canada) G Dabrowski (Croatia) D Jurak	6	6^{6}	[10]
(Czech Republic) L Hradecká (Slovenia) A Klepač	w/o
2	(Czech Republic) K Peschke (Netherlands) D Schuurs

Semi-finals
1	(United States) N Melichar (China) Y Xu	6	6
(United States) S Kenin (United States) B Mattek-Sands	4	3
3	(Canada) G Dabrowski (Croatia) D Jurak	6^{6}	7^{7}	[10]
(Czech Republic) L Hradecká (Slovenia) A Klepač	7^{8}	6^{3}	[5]

Final
1	(United States) N Melichar (China) Y Xu	2	7	[10]
3	(Canada) G Dabrowski (Croatia) D Jurak	6	5	[5]
