= 2020 Brisbane International – Singles =

Singles
- 2020 Brisbane International

Final
- Champion: (Czech Republic) Karolína Plíšková
- Runner-up: (United States) Madison Keys
- Score: 6–4, 4–6, 7–5

Details
- Draw: 30 (4 Q / 4 WC )
- Seeds: 8

Events
Singles	Doubles
- Brisbane International

Defending champion Karolína Plíšková defeated Madison Keys in the final, 6–4, 4–6, 7–5 to win the women's singles tennis title at the 2020 Brisbane International. Plíšková saved a match point en route to the title, against Naomi Osaka in the semifinals.

== Seeds ==
The top two seeds received a bye into the second round.

1. (Australia) Ashleigh Barty (second round)
2. (Czech Republic) Karolína Plíšková (champion)
3. (Japan) Naomi Osaka (semifinals)
4. (Ukraine) Elina Svitolina (first round)
5. (Czech Republic) Petra Kvitová (semifinals)
6. (Netherlands) Kiki Bertens (quarterfinals)
7. (United Kingdom) Johanna Konta (first round)
8. (United States) Madison Keys (final)

== Draw ==
Key

- Q = Qualifier
- WC = Wild card
- LL = Lucky loser
- Alt = Alternate
- ITF = ITF entry
- PR = Protected ranking
- SR = Special ranking
- SE = Special exempt
- JE = Junior exempt
- JR = Junior Accelerator Programme entrant
- CO = College Accelerator Programme entrant
- NG = Next Gen Accelerator Program entrant
- w/o = Walkover
- r = Retired
- d = Defaulted

=== Finals ===
Semifinals
5	(Czech Republic) Petra Kvitová	6	2	3
8	(United States) Madison Keys	3	6	6
3	(Japan) Naomi Osaka	7^{12}	6^{3}	2
2	(Czech Republic) Karolína Plíšková	6^{10}	7^{7}	6

Final
8	(United States) Madison Keys	4	6	5
2	(Czech Republic) Karolína Plíšková	6	4	7

=== Top half ===
First round
WC	(Russia) M Sharapova	6	1	6^{3}
Q	(United States) J Brady	3	6	7^{7}
(United States) S Stephens	4	6	3
Q	(Russia) L Samsonova	6	2	6
(Russia) A Pavlyuchenkova	6	1	0
5	(Czech Republic) P Kvitová	2	6	6
4	(Ukraine) E Svitolina	1	1
(United States) D Collins	6	6
(Croatia) D Vekić	3	6	5
Q	(Kazakhstan) Y Putintseva	6	3	7
WC	(Australia) S Stosur	7^{7}	7^{7}
(Germany) A Kerber	6^{5}	6^{4}
Q	(Czech Republic) M Bouzková	3	2
8	(United States) M Keys	6	6

Second round
1	(Australia) A Barty	4	6^{4}
Q	(United States) J Brady	6	7^{7}
Q	(Russia) L Samsonova	3	2
5	(Czech Republic) P Kvitová	6	6
(United States) D Collins	6	6
Q	(Kazakhstan) Y Putintseva	1	0
WC	(Australia) S Stosur	5	3
8	(United States) M Keys	7	6

Quarterfinals
Q	(United States) J Brady	4	2
5	(Czech Republic) P Kvitová	6	6
(United States) D Collins	4	1
8	(United States) M Keys	6	6

Semifinals
5	(Czech Republic) P Kvitová	6	2	3
8	(United States) M Keys	3	6	6

=== Bottom half ===
First round
6	(Netherlands) K Bertens	6	1	6
(Ukraine) D Yastremska	4	6	3
(Estonia) A Kontaveit	6	6
(Chinese Taipei) S-w Hsieh	4	1
(United States) S Kenin	7^{7}	6
(Latvia) A Sevastova	6^{1}	4
(Greece) M Sakkari	2	7^{7}	3
3	(Japan) N Osaka	6	6^{4}	6
7	(United Kingdom) J Konta	2	6	3
(Czech Republic) B Strýcová	6	3	6
(United States) A Riske	6	6
(Czech Republic) K Muchová	4	2
WC	(Australia) A Tomljanović	6	4	6
WC	(Australia) P Hon	2	6	4

Second round
6	(Netherlands) K Bertens	6	2	7
(Estonia) A Kontaveit	3	6	5
(United States) S Kenin	7^{7}	3	1
3	(Japan) N Osaka	6^{3}	6	6
(Czech Republic) B Strýcová	3	4
(United States) A Riske	6	6
WC	(Australia) A Tomljanović	4	7^{7}	1
2	(Czech Republic) Ka Plíšková	6	6^{5}	6

Quarterfinals
6	(Netherlands) K Bertens	3	6	3
3	(Japan) N Osaka	6	3	6
(United States) A Riske	6^{6}	3
2	(Czech Republic) Ka Plíšková	7^{8}	6

Semifinals
3	(Japan) N Osaka	7^{12}	6^{3}	2
2	(Czech Republic) Ka Plíšková	6^{10}	7^{7}	6

== Qualifying ==
=== Seeds ===
1. (Kazakhstan) Yulia Putintseva (qualified)
2. (France) Kristina Mladenovic (second round)
3. (Russia) Veronika Kudermetova (qualifying competition)
4. (United States) Jennifer Brady (qualified)
5. (Czech Republic) Marie Bouzková (qualified)
6. (France) Fiona Ferro (first round)
7. (United States) Bernarda Pera (first round)
8. (Switzerland) Viktorija Golubic (second round)

=== Qualifiers ===
1. (Kazakhstan) Yulia Putintseva
2. (Russia) Liudmila Samsonova
3. (Czech Republic) Marie Bouzková
4. (United States) Jennifer Brady

=== Qualifying draw ===
==== First qualifier ====
First round
1	(Kazakhstan) Yulia Putintseva	6	6
(United Kingdom) Harriet Dart	4	3
(United States) Madison Brengle	6	6
(Ukraine) Katarina Zavatska	2	3
WC	(Australia) Destanee Aiava	3	4
(Russia) Anastasia Potapova	6	6
(Slovakia) Rebecca Šramková	2	2
8	(Switzerland) Viktorija Golubic	6	6

Second round
1	(Kazakhstan) Yulia Putintseva	5	6	6
(United States) Madison Brengle	7	2	1
(Russia) Anastasia Potapova	2	7	6
8	(Switzerland) Viktorija Golubic	6	5	2

Qualifying competition
1	(Kazakhstan) Yulia Putintseva	6	6
(Russia) Anastasia Potapova	4	3

==== Second qualifier ====
First round
2	(France) Kristina Mladenovic	6	4	6
WC	(Australia) Ellen Perez	4	6	4
(Russia) Liudmila Samsonova	7^{9}	6^{4}	6
WC	(Australia) Kaylah McPhee	6^{7}	7^{7}	4
(Slovakia) Anna Karolína Schmiedlová	0	6	6
(Bulgaria) Viktoriya Tomova	6	4	4
(Ukraine) Marta Kostyuk	7^{8}	6
7	(United States) Bernarda Pera	6^{6}	4

Second round
2	(France) Kristina Mladenovic	1	4
(Russia) Liudmila Samsonova	6	6
(Slovakia) Anna Karolína Schmiedlová	7	4	3
(Ukraine) Marta Kostyuk	5	6	6

Qualifying competition
(Russia) Liudmila Samsonova	7^{7}	6
(Ukraine) Marta Kostyuk	6^{4}	4

==== Third qualifier ====
First round
3	(Russia) Veronika Kudermetova	7	6
(Austria) Barbara Haas	5	3
(Australia) Maddison Inglis	6	3	5
(Russia) Natalia Vikhlyantseva	4	6	7
(Australia) Lizette Cabrera	6	6
(United States) Whitney Osuigwe	2	1
(Estonia) Kaia Kanepi	5	3
5	(Czech Republic) Marie Bouzková	7	6

Second round
3	(Russia) Veronika Kudermetova	5	6	6
(Russia) Natalia Vikhlyantseva	7	4	2
(Australia) Lizette Cabrera	5	4
5	(Czech Republic) Marie Bouzková	7	6

Qualifying competition
3	(Russia) Veronika Kudermetova	5	6	3
5	(Czech Republic) Marie Bouzková	7	4	6

==== Fourth qualifier ====
First round
4	(United States) Jennifer Brady	6	6
(France) Chloé Paquet	2	1
(Poland) Katarzyna Kawa	3	5
(United States) Francesca Di Lorenzo	6	7
(Russia) Varvara Flink	2	6	4
WC	(Australia) Storm Sanders	6	2	6
(United Kingdom) Heather Watson	6	7^{7}
6	(France) Fiona Ferro	2	6^{4}

Second round
4	(United States) Jennifer Brady	6	6
(United States) Francesca Di Lorenzo	2	0
WC	(Australia) Storm Sanders	6	3	6
(United Kingdom) Heather Watson	2	6	3

Qualifying competition
4	(United States) Jennifer Brady	7^{9}	6
WC	(Australia) Storm Sanders	6^{7}	1
