= 2020 Internationaux de Strasbourg – Doubles =

Doubles
- 2020 Internationaux de Strasbourg

Final
- Champions: (United States) Nicole Melichar (Netherlands) Demi Schuurs
- Runners-up: (United States) Hayley Carter (Brazil) Luisa Stefani
- Score: 6–4, 6–3

Events
Singles	Doubles
- Internationaux de Strasbourg

Daria Gavrilova and Ellen Perez were the defending champions but Gavrilova chose not to participate. Perez played alongside Storm Sanders but lost in the first round to Nicole Melichar and Demi Schuurs.

Melichar and Schuurs went on to win the title, defeating Hayley Carter and Luisa Stefani in the final, 6–4, 6–3.

== Seeds ==
1. (United States) Nicole Melichar / (Netherlands) Demi Schuurs (champions)
2. (Canada) Gabriela Dabrowski / (Latvia) Jeļena Ostapenko (semifinals)
3. (Japan) Shuko Aoyama / (Japan) Ena Shibahara (semifinals)
4. (United States) Hayley Carter / (Brazil) Luisa Stefani (final)

== Draw ==
Key

- Q = Qualifier
- WC = Wild card
- LL = Lucky loser
- Alt = Alternate
- ITF = ITF entry
- PR = Protected ranking
- SR = Special ranking
- SE = Special exempt
- JE = Junior exempt
- JR = Junior Accelerator Programme entrant
- CO = College Accelerator Programme entrant
- NG = Next Gen Accelerator Program entrant
- w/o = Walkover
- r = Retired
- d = Defaulted

=== Draw ===
First round
1	(United States) N Melichar (Netherlands) D Schuurs	6	6
(Australia) E Perez (Australia) S Sanders	4	3
(Ukraine) L Kichenok (Ukraine) N Kichenok	6^{6}	6	[13]
(Germany) A-L Friedsam (Slovenia) K Srebotnik	7^{8}	2	[15]
3	(Japan) S Aoyama (Japan) E Shibahara	6	6
(Russia) E Alexandrova (Georgia (country)) O Kalashnikova	2	4
PR	(Ukraine) K Bondarenko (Canada) S Fichman	6	7
WC	(France) C Burel (France) D Parry	2	5
(Japan) M Kato (United States) S Santamaria	7^{7}	3	[8]
4	(United States) H Carter (Brazil) L Stefani	6^{4}	6	[10]
(Chile) A Guarachi (United States) D Krawczyk	4	7^{9}	[4]
(Japan) N Hibino (Japan) M Ninomiya	6	6^{7}	[10]
(United States) K Christian (Mexico) G Olmos	2	6	[5]
2	(Canada) G Dabrowski (Latvia) J Ostapenko	6	3	[10]

Quarterfinals
1	(United States) N Melichar (Netherlands) D Schuurs	6	6
(Germany) A-L Friedsam (Slovenia) K Srebotnik	2	3
3	(Japan) S Aoyama (Japan) E Shibahara	6	6
PR	(Ukraine) K Bondarenko (Canada) S Fichman	4	3
(United States) S Stephens (Switzerland) J Teichmann	2	4
4	(United States) H Carter (Brazil) L Stefani	6	6
(Japan) N Hibino (Japan) M Ninomiya	5	1
2	(Canada) G Dabrowski (Latvia) J Ostapenko	7	6

Semifinals
1	(United States) N Melichar (Netherlands) D Schuurs	6	7^{7}
3	(Japan) S Aoyama (Japan) E Shibahara	2	6^{3}
4	(United States) H Carter (Brazil) L Stefani	6	6
2	(Canada) G Dabrowski (Latvia) J Ostapenko	3	4

Final
1	(United States) N Melichar (Netherlands) D Schuurs	6	6
4	(United States) H Carter (Brazil) L Stefani	4	3
