= Jennifer Brady =

American tennis player (born 1995)

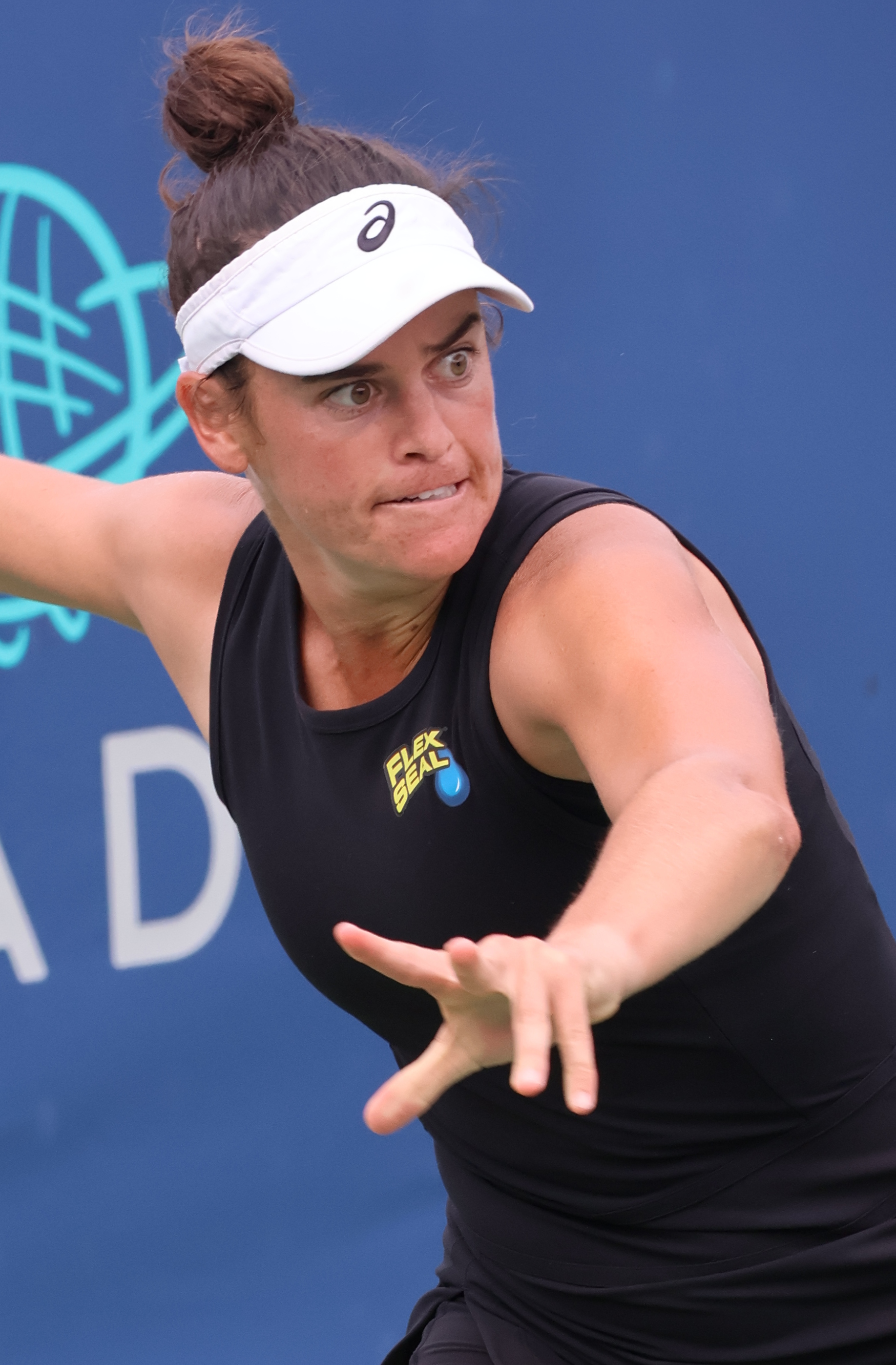
- Brady at the 2023 Washington Open
- Country (sports): United States
- Born: April 12, 1995 (age 31) Harrisburg, Pennsylvania, US
- Height: 1.78 m (5 ft 10 in)
- Turned pro: 2014
- Plays: Right (two-handed backhand)
- College: UCLA
- Prize money: US$ 5,121,514

Singles
- Career record: 251–177
- Career titles: 1
- Highest ranking: No. 13 (February 22, 2021)
- Current ranking: No. 598 (September 14, 2026)

Grand Slam singles results
- Australian Open: F (2021)
- French Open: 3R (2021)
- Wimbledon: 2R (2017, 2018)
- US Open: SF (2020)

Other tournaments
- Olympic Games: 1R (2021)

Doubles
- Career record: 85–68
- Career titles: 1
- Highest ranking: No. 44 (August 19, 2019)
- Current ranking: No. 329 (September 14, 2026)

Grand Slam doubles results
- Australian Open: SF (2019)
- French Open: 3R (2018)
- Wimbledon: 2R (2019)
- US Open: SF (2023)

Grand Slam mixed doubles results
- Wimbledon: 3R (2019)
- US Open: 1R (2017)

Team competitions
- Fed Cup: 0–1
- Last updated on: September 20, 2026.

Jennifer Elizabeth Brady (born April 12, 1995) is an American professional tennis player. She reached a career-high singles WTA ranking of 13 in February 2021, and a career-high doubles ranking of No. 44 in August 2019. Brady has won one WTA Tour singles title and one doubles title, as well as four singles and five doubles titles on the ITF Women's Circuit. Her best performance at the majors was a runner-up finish at the 2021 Australian Open.

Brady first rose to prominence during her run to the fourth round of the 2017 Australian Open as a qualifier. She reached the same stage of that year's US Open, before falling to world No. 1 Karolína Plíšková. Following struggles with injuries and an increased focus on doubles—including a semifinal showing at the 2019 Australian Open—Brady returned to prominence in singles in 2020, where she defeated world No. 1 Ashleigh Barty at Brisbane. She followed by winning her first WTA Tour singles title at the Top Seed Open, and a run to the semifinals at the 2020 US Open. Brady then achieved her career highlight by reaching a major final at the 2021 Australian Open, where she lost to Naomi Osaka. Since late 2021, knee injuries have severely limited her career.

== College ==
Brady previously attended the University of California, Los Angeles (UCLA) and made her debut for the Bruins tennis team in 2013. During her freshman year at UCLA, she helped her team win the 2014 Division 1 Women's Tennis National Championship in Athens, Georgia. She completed her sophomore year of college before turning professional in 2014.

== Professional ==
=== 2014–2016: Early years ===
Brady made her Grand Slam tournament debut at the 2014 US Open, having received a wildcard with Samantha Crawford for the women's doubles main draw. Brady won four titles in singles and five in doubles on the ITF Women's Circuit. She first played in the main draw of a WTA 125 tournament at the Carlsbad Classic in November 2015, reaching the semifinals. On the WTA Tour, she reached the quarterfinals of the Guangzhou International Open in September 2016, defeating qualifier Anastasia Pivovarova and sixth seed Danka Kovinić, before losing to third seed Ana Konjuh.

=== 2017: Breakthrough at the majors ===
Brady reached the singles main draw of a Grand Slam tournament for the first time at the Australian Open, after winning all three of her qualifying matches. In the main draw, she defeated Maryna Zanevska, Heather Watson and 14th seed Elena Vesnina. Her run came to an end in the fourth round with a straight set loss to Mirjana Lučić-Baroni.

Due to her success at the Australian Open, Brady obtained a direct spot in the main-draw of the remaining three majors without playing qualifying. At the French Open, she lost her opening-round match to 13th seed Kristina Mladenovic. At Wimbledon, she defeated Danka Kovinić then lost in the second round to eighth seed Dominika Cibulková. At the US Open, she defeated Andrea Petkovic, 23rd seed Barbora Strýcová and Monica Niculescu to reach the fourth round, where she lost to top seed Karolína Plíšková.

=== 2018–19: Slump in singles, success in doubles ===
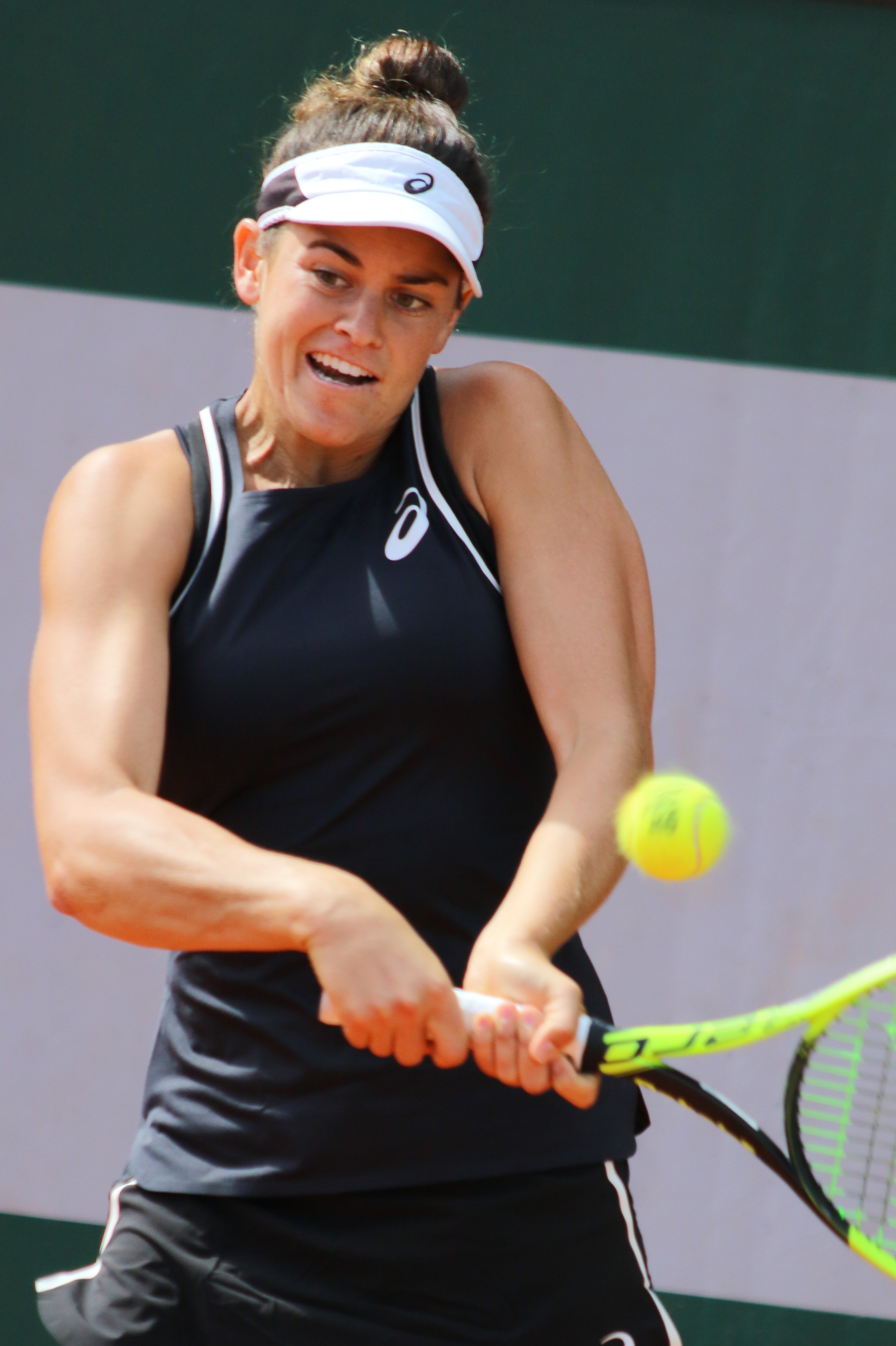
Brady at the 2018 French Open

In 2018, Brady had more success in doubles than singles. She reached the quarterfinals of the Australian Open with Vania King. In March, she reached the final of the WTA 125 Indian Wells Challenger with King, where they fell to Taylor Townsend and Yanina Wickmayer in two sets.

Brady began 2019 by reaching the semifinals in doubles of the Australian Open with Alison Riske, before falling to the world No. 2 team of Tímea Babos and Kristina Mladenovic. In February, she made it to the third round of the Dubai Championships where she defeated world No. 22, Jeļena Ostapenko and No. 20, Caroline Garcia, before falling to No. 4, Petra Kvitová, in three sets. The following week, she reached the final of the Indian Wells Challenger, in which she fell to Viktorija Golubic, in three sets. To keep the hot streak going, the following week at the Indian Wells Open, she defeated world No. 19, Caroline Garcia, before falling to No. 12, Ashleigh Barty, in the third round.

Brady's next notable result of the year came during the grass-court swing at the Nottingham Open when she reached semifinals, before falling to eventual champion Caroline Garcia, in three sets. She also had a strong showing at the Premier Mandatory China Open where she defeated fellow Americans Amanda Anisimova and Madison Keys, before falling to US Open champion, Bianca Andreescu, in the third round.

=== 2020: Top 50, WTA Tour title, US Open semifinal, top 25 year-end ranking ===
Brady began the season at the Brisbane International, where she made it through qualifying and went on to defeat Maria Sharapova, before stunning world No. 1 and home favorite, Ash Barty, in the round of 16. She lost in the quarterfinals to world No. 4, Petra Kvitová, in straight sets. Brady lost in the first round at the Australian Open to Simona Halep. In doubles, she reached the quarterfinals for the third consecutive year, but she and Caroline Dolehide fell to top seeded Hsieh Su-wei and Barbora Strýcová, in straight sets.

Brady made it through qualifying at the Dubai Tennis Championships and then secured her second win over a top-10 opponent of her career when she defeated No. 6, Elina Svitolina, in the first round. In the second, she faced Markéta Vondroušová and rallied from a set and a double break down to win the match in three sets. In the quarterfinals, she faced two time major champion and former world No. 1, Garbiñe Muguruza, defeating her in a three-setter to move on to her first Premier semifinal, where she lost in two sets to eventual champion Simona Halep.

Brady participated in the all-star Volvo Car Open in Daniel Island, an exhibition event that served as the Charleston tournament, after organizers reformatted the tournament following the COVID-19 pandemic as a Laver Cup style event. She was drafted by Bethanie Mattek-Sands to Team Peace, which won 26–22, going 4–0 with nine points (one win in the second day for one point, one win in the fourth day for two points, one win in the fifth day for three points, and one win in the sixth day for three points). She was the only undefeated player for the entire exhibition event.

Her first tournament following the resumption of the WTA Tour was the Kentucky Open where she won her maiden WTA Tour singles title. She defeated Heather Watson, sixth seed Magda Linette, Marie Bouzková, Coco Gauff and Jil Teichmann without dropping a set all tournament. Following her victory, Brady's ranking rose to a career-high No. 40.

At the US Open, Brady was seeded 28th despite being ranked 41st in the world due to the number of top-20 players who pulled out of the tournament. She defeated Anna Blinkova, CiCi Bellis and Caroline Garcia in straight sets, before defeating 2016 champion and former world No. 1, Angelique Kerber, to advance to her first Grand Slam quarterfinal. She then recorded another straight sets win over the 23rd seed Yulia Putintseva to reach her first major semifinal, which she lost to Naomi Osaka in three sets.

=== 2021–2022: Australian Open final, top 15, Olympics debut, and injury hiatus ===
Brady started the season in Abu Dhabi. After winning the first set, she lost in the first round to Tamara Zidanšek. She also played doubles in the same tournament with Garbiñe Muguruza, they lost in the quarterfinals.

At the Australian Open, Brady beat Aliona Bolsova, Madison Brengle, Kaja Juvan, Donna Vekić, Jessica Pegula and Karolína Muchová to reach her first major final in which she was defeated by Naomi Osaka, in straight sets. As a result, she reached a career-high of world No. 13 in the singles rankings on February 22, 2021.

At her debut at the Summer Olympics, Brady was the 11th and only American seed in the tournament. However, she was defeated by Italian Camila Giorgi, in the first round, in straight sets.

Brady's next tournament was the 2021 Cincinnati Open. In the first round, she beat Ekaterina Alexandrova in straight sets. In the second round, she suffered a knee injury, after taking the first set from Jelena Ostapenko. This injury would keep Brady out of tennis for two years.

=== 2023: Return to WTA Tour, US Open third round & doubles semifinal ===
Brady wanted to return to professional tennis at the French Open, however, these plans were stopped by a foot injury.

She had a successful return at the $100k Granby Championships in Canada where she defeated Kyōka Okamura in straight sets. Brady then lost to the sixth seed, Himeno Sakatsume, in the second round.

Brady made her return to the WTA Tour at the Washington Open using a protected ranking. She defeated Anhelina Kalinina in the first round, before losing to No. 17 ranked Madison Keys. At the Canadian Open, Brady overcame Jeļena Ostapenko to make it into the second round, where she lost to third seed Elena Rybakina, both matches going to three sets. Next she lost to Donna Vekić in the opening round at the Cincinnati Open.

At the US Open, Brady defeated lucky loser Kimberly Birrell and 24th seed Magda Linette, before losing to Caroline Wozniacki in the third round in three sets. Partnering Luisa Stefani, she reached the semifinals in the doubles, losing to 12th seeds Laura Siegemund and Vera Zvonareva

In October at the China Open, Brady overcame Peyton Stearns in straight sets, but then retired after just four games of her next match against Magda Linette due to injury.

=== 2024–2026: Knee surgery and hiatus ===
In January 2024, Brady announced she needed surgery on her right knee and expected to be out of competitive action for a lengthy period of time.

After more than two years out of competitive action, Brady used her protected ranking to enter the qualifying draw at the 2026 Australian Open. However, one week before the event was due to get underway, she withdrew for undisclosed reasons. Brady made her comeback at the W100 San Diego in the last week of January 2026, reaching the semifinals. She then lost in qualifying at the 2026 ATX Open, before receiving a wildcard entry to make her WTA Tour main-draw return the following week at Indian Wells. Brady lost in the first round to Antonia Ružić, in three sets. She also received a wildcard to enter the main draw at the Miami Open where she again lost in the first round, this time to Sloane Stephens. Brady suffered another first-round exit at the Charleston Open where she entered as a wildcard player and lost in straight sets to Viktoriya Tomova.

== Playing style ==
Brady is an aggressive player who possesses an all-court game. She is a strong server, with her first serve being recorded as high as 114 mph (184 km/h), allowing her to serve multiple aces per match. She also possesses an effective kick serve, that prevents opponents scoring free points on second serves. Her greatest weapon is her forehand, which is hit with heavy topspin, pushing her opponents far beyond the baseline, allowing her to accumulate a high number of winners with this shot. She also possesses an effective two-handed backhand, with which she can hit winners from any position on the court. Due to her doubles experience, she is an effective volleyer, possessing a complete repertoire of shots to perform at the net, and will frequently choose to approach the net to finish points. Due to her fitness, she possesses an effective defensive game, and is a strong player on return.

== World TeamTennis ==
Brady has played one season with World TeamTennis starting in 2019, when she made her debut with the Washington Kastles. It was announced that she would be joining the Orange County Breakers during the 2020 WTT season (canceled due to the pandemic).

== Endorsements ==
Brady is endorsed by Flex Seal, Asics for attire and by Babolat for racquets and uses the Babolat Pure Aero racquet.

== Career statistics ==
=== Grand Slam performance timelines ===
Key
W	F	SF	QF	#R	RR	Q#	P#	DNQ	A	Z#	PO	G	S	B	NMS	NTI	P	NH

(W) winner; (F) finalist; (SF) semifinalist; (QF) quarterfinalist; (#R) rounds 4, 3, 2, 1; (RR) round-robin stage; (Q#) qualification round; (P#) preliminary round; (DNQ) did not qualify; (A) absent; (Z#) Davis/Fed Cup Zonal Group (with number indication) or (PO) play-off; (G) gold, (S) silver or (B) bronze Olympic/Paralympic medal; (NMS) not a Masters tournament; (NTI) not a Tier I tournament; (P) postponed; (NH) not held; (SR) strike rate (events won / competed); (W–L) win–loss record.
To avoid confusion and double counting, these charts are updated at the conclusion of a tournament or when the player's participation has ended.

Current through the 2023 US Open.

==== Singles ====
Tournament	2014	2015	2016	2017	2018	2019	2020	2021	2022	2023	2026	SR	W–L	Win %
Australian Open	A	A	A	4R	1R	Q3	1R	F	A	A	A	0 / 4	9–4	69%
French Open	A	A	Q3	1R	2R	2R	1R	3R	A	A	A	0 / 5	4–5	44%
Wimbledon	A	A	Q1	2R	2R	1R	NH	A	A	A	A	0 / 3	2–3	40%
US Open	Q1	Q1	Q3	4R	1R	1R	SF	A	A	3R	A	0 / 5	10–5	67%
Win–loss	0–0	0–0	0–0	7–4	2–4	1–3	5–3	8–2	0–0	2–1	0–0	0 / 17	25–17	60%
Career statistics
Titles	0	0	0	0	0	0	1	0	0	0	0	Career total: 1		
Finals	0	0	0	0	0	0	1	1	0	0	0	Career total: 2		
Year-end ranking	267	229	111	64	116	56	24	25	227	–		$5,037,050		

==== Doubles ====
Tournament	2014	...	2017	2018	2019	2020	2021	2022	2023	SR	W–L
Australian Open	A		A	QF	SF	QF	2R	A	A	0 / 4	11–3
French Open	A		2R	3R	1R	2R	A	A	A	0 / 4	4–4
Wimbledon	A		1R	2R	2R	NH	A	A	A	0 / 3	2–3
US Open	1R		1R	2R	1R	1R	A	A	SF	0 / 6	5–6
Win–loss	0–1		1–3	7–4	5–4	4–3	1–0	0–0	4–1	0 / 17	22–16

== Grand Slam tournament final ==
=== Singles: 1 (runner-up) ===
Result	Year	Championship	Surface	Opponent	Score
Loss	2021	Australian Open	Hard	(Japan) Naomi Osaka	4–6, 3–6
