= Sara Errani =

Italian tennis player (born 1987)

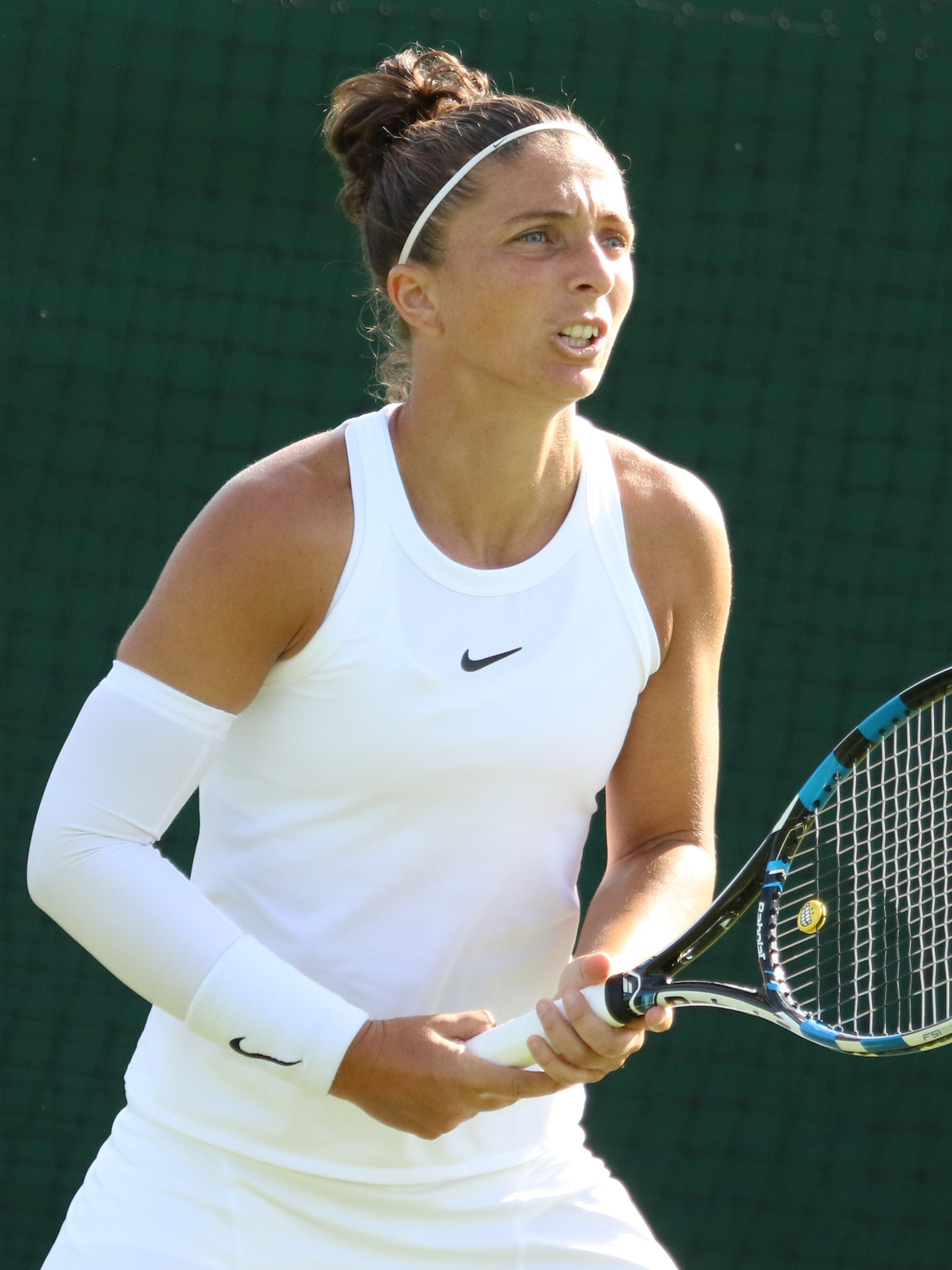
- Errani at the 2022 Wimbledon Championships
- Country (sports): Italy
- Residence: Bologna, Italy
- Born: 29 April 1987 (age 39) Bologna, Italy
- Height: 1.64 m (5 ft 5 in)
- Turned pro: 2002
- Retired: 19 May 2025 (singles)
- Plays: Right-handed (two-handed backhand)
- Coach: Pablo Lozano Beamud (2004–2016, present)
- Prize money: US $18,558,306: 36th in all-time rankings
- Official website: sara-errani.com

Singles
- Career record: 690–516
- Career titles: 9
- Highest ranking: No. 5 (20 May 2013)

Grand Slam singles results
- Australian Open: QF (2012)
- French Open: F (2012)
- Wimbledon: 3R (2010, 2012)
- US Open: SF (2012)

Other tournaments
- Tour Finals: RR (2012, 2013)
- Olympic Games: 3R (2016)

Doubles
- Career record: 408–234
- Career titles: 37
- Highest ranking: No. 1 (10 September 2012)
- Current ranking: No. 9 (16 November 2026)

Grand Slam doubles results
- Australian Open: W (2013, 2014)
- French Open: W (2012, 2025)
- Wimbledon: W (2014)
- US Open: W (2012)

Other doubles tournaments
- Tour Finals: F (2026)
- Olympic Games: W (2024)

Mixed doubles
- Career titles: 5

Grand Slam mixed doubles results
- Australian Open: 2R (2025)
- French Open: W (2025, 2026)
- Wimbledon: 2R (2025, 2026)
- US Open: W (2024, 2025)

Other mixed doubles tournaments
- Olympic Games: QF (2024)

Team competitions
- BJK Cup: W (2009, 2010, 2013, 2024, 2025)
Medal record
Representing Italy
Olympic Games
Gold medal – first place	2024 Paris	Doubles
- Last updated on: 21 August 2025.

Sara Errani (Italian: [ˈsaːra erˈraːni]; born 29 April 1987) is an Italian professional tennis player. Errani is one of only seven women who have completed a Career Golden Slam in doubles. She is an Olympic Games gold medalist, a former doubles world No. 1, ten-time major champion in doubles and mixed doubles and a finalist in singles. With 9 singles, 37 doubles and 5 mixed doubles titles, she is the Italian tennis player with the highest number of titles. Errani reached a career-high singles ranking of world No. 5 on 20 May 2013. She is currently a top-10 player in doubles and the coach of Jasmine Paolini.

Errani's breakthrough season occurred in 2012. At the Australian Open, she reached the quarterfinals in singles (the first time she advanced past the third round in a Grand Slam singles draw) and was a finalist in doubles. Known as a clay-court specialist, Errani won three titles on clay going into the 2012 French Open, where she reached the finals in both the singles (becoming the second Italian woman to ever reach a Grand Slam singles final, with Francesca Schiavone being the first at the 2010 French Open) and doubles tournaments, winning the doubles title with her partner Roberta Vinci. They also won the doubles titles at the 2012 US Open, and the 2013 and 2014 Australian Open. By winning the 2014 Wimbledon Women's Doubles title, Errani and Vinci became only the fifth pair in tennis history to complete a Career Grand Slam. She became the seventh player in the Open Era to achieve a Golden Slam, winning the Olympics with Jasmine Paolini. She won three times the WTA Awards as best doubles team with Vinci and once in 2024 with Paolini.

Her achievement in reaching the 2012 US Open singles semifinals leaves Wimbledon as the only Grand Slam tournament in which Errani has yet to make the quarterfinals in singles. She also made the semifinals at the 2013 French Open, the quarterfinals at the 2014 French Open, 2014 US Open, and 2015 French Open, and qualified to the WTA Finals twice in 2012 and 2013. In 2017, Errani was banned from playing for ten months due to a failed drug test. At the 2024 Summer Olympics, she was the only player along with fellow countryman Andrea Vavassori to qualify and play at the same time in singles, doubles and mixed doubles. Her partnership with Vavassori has proven successful, the pair winning four mixed doubles major titles, including in their first participations at 2024 US Open and 2025 French Open.

Errani was the year-end number-one doubles player in both 2013 and 2014. She held the top ranking for a combined total of 87 weeks, first achieved on 10 September 2012. She entered the top 10 in doubles on 11 June 2012, remaining there for 94 straight weeks.

== Early life ==
Errani was born in Bologna to Giorgio, a greengrocer, and Fulvia, a pharmacist. At the age of 12, her father sent her to the Nick Bollettieri Tennis Academy in Florida. At 16, she moved to Valencia, Spain to be coached by Pablo Lozano and David Andres.

== Career ==
=== 2002–2007: Early years ===
Errani qualified for her first event at the $10k Cagliari event in her native Italy in 2002, where she lost to Sun Tiantian. She continued to compete in the ITF, where her best performance of the year was a semifinal appearance in Zaton, losing in straight sets to Lenka Tvarošková. She continued to participate mainly on the ITF circuit, where she won her first tournament over Lucia Jiménez in Melilla, Spain in February 2005.

=== 2008–2011 ===
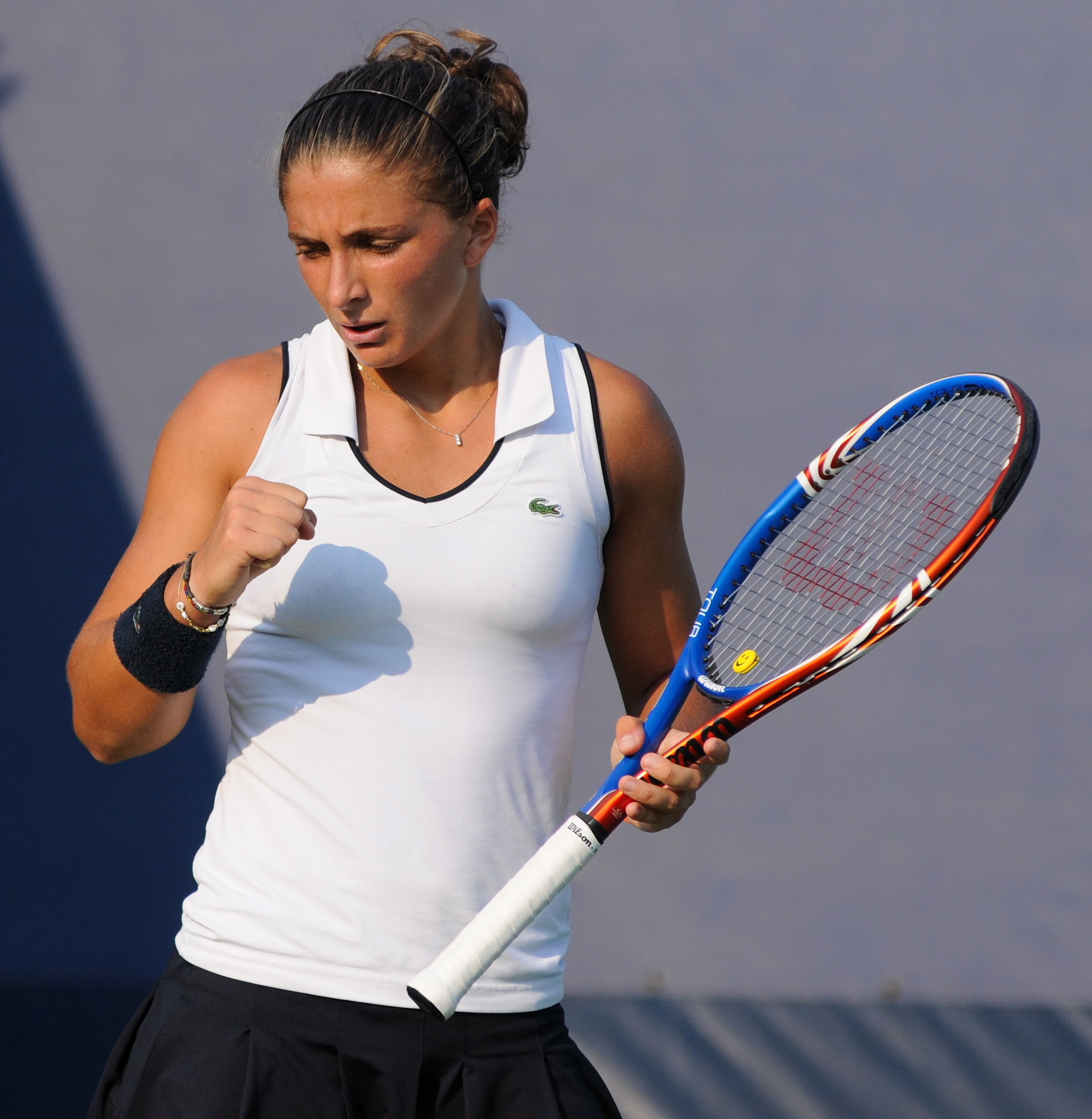
Sara Errani at the 2010 US Open

The first WTA Tour title of her career was in the Internazionali Femminili di Palermo where she defeated Mariya Koryttseva in the final. On 27 July 2008, she captured her second career title in two weeks, defeating Anabel Medina Garrigues. She has also won six doubles titles.

In 2009, Errani was the runner-up at two WTA tournaments, in Palermo and Portorož, as the defending champion in both. Errani was defeated in the first round of the French Open by defending champion Ana Ivanovic, whom she beat in the third round three years later.

Errani reached the third round in every major except the French Open in 2010, where she lost in the first round.

Errani was a member of Fed Cup-winning Italian team in 2009 and 2010. In February 2011, she reached the finals of the Pattaya Open where she was defeated by Daniela Hantuchová.

=== 2012: Major singles final, doubles No. 1 ===
At the beginning of 2012, Errani decided to change her racquet, switching from Wilson to Babolat, opting for a heavier and slightly longer model than the last, allowing for more power and better reach. This change caused her to return her $30,000 endorsement fee to Wilson. However, she and several commentators cite the new racquet as a reason for her improved game and her entry into the top 10 of the WTA rankings. In the first five months of 2012, she won three singles titles, earning over $1.3 million in prize money. Errani dubbed her new racquet "Excalibur", named after the sword of King Arthur.

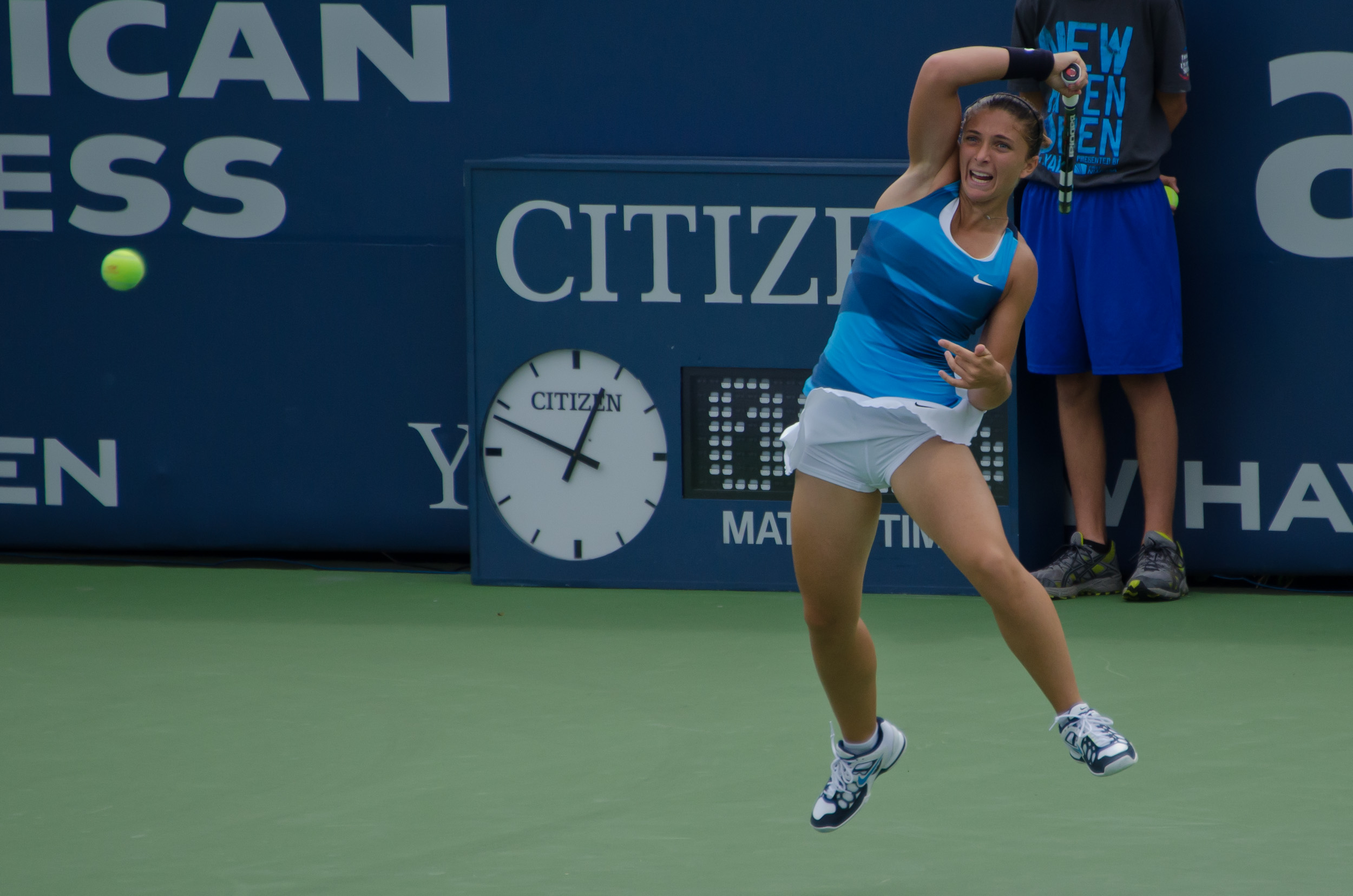
Sara Errani at the 2012 New Haven Open at Yale

At the Australian Open Errani advanced to her first Grand Slam quarterfinals, defeating Valeria Savinykh, Nadia Petrova, Sorana Cîrstea, and Zheng Jie en route, before losing to Petra Kvitová. Her ranking jumped to world No. 33. At the Abierto Monterrey Open, she was the second seed and reached the semifinals, losing to eventual champion Tímea Babos, but she triumphed on the clay in Acapulco as the third seed, winning her third career title. She defeated fellow Italians Roberta Vinci, and second seed Flavia Pennetta in her last two matches.

As the seventh seed at the Barcelona Ladies Open, Errani stormed to her fourth career title and second of the year, not dropping a set, beating second seeded Julia Görges in the quarterfinals, Carla Suárez Navarro in the semifinals, and Dominika Cibulková in the finals. Afterwards, her ranking rose to world No. 28. In the Fed Cup semifinals against the Czech Republic, Errani lost to Petra Kvitová, but beat Andrea Hlaváčková, with Italy losing the tie. On 7 May, Errani won the Budapest Grand Prix, tying country woman Roberta Vinci for the most titles won by an Italian female in a year at three.

Her performance continued to improve when she reached the final of the French Open. En route she defeated Casey Dellacqua, Melanie Oudin, and former French Open winners Ana Ivanovic and Svetlana Kuznetsova. She secured a place in the semifinals by eliminating the German tenth seed Angelique Kerber, her first win over a current top-10 player. In the semifinals, she overcame the reigning US Open champion and 2010 French Open finalist Samantha Stosur to reach her first Grand Slam singles final opposite Maria Sharapova. Errani lost in the final but her progress in this tournament helped her achieve the No. 10 ranking.

In addition to her singles wins, Errani also won six doubles titles with Roberta Vinci including the Madrid Open, the Internazionali d'Italia, and the French Open. She and Vinci also made the finals of the Indian Wells Open and the Australian Open.

At Wimbledon, Errani lost 6-0, 6-4 in the third round to Yaroslava Shvedova, suffering the loss of the first, and to date only, golden set (a set in which one player wins every point) in a major in the open era, and only the second ever in a top-level tournament. In July, at the Italiacom Open, Errani, without losing a set, won her fourth title of the year, the sixth in her career. She defeated the Czech Barbora Záhlavová-Strýcová (seeded eighth) in the final. Errani then lost in the first round of the singles competition at the 2012 Summer Olympics in London, as well as the first round of the mixed doubles (with Andreas Seppi). However, she and Vinci reached the quarterfinals of the women's doubles.

She played the New Haven Open as the fourth seed. She reached the semifinals by beating fifth seed Marion Bartoli. She lost in the semifinals to Petra Kvitová. At the US Open, Errani had a slow start by beating Garbiñe Muguruza in three sets. However, she easily defeated the Russians Vera Dushevina and Olga Puchkova. She lost only three games in these two rounds. In the fourth round, she defeated sixth seed, Angelique Kerber. In the quarterfinals, she defeated her doubles partner Vinci to come into the semifinals, where she lost in straight sets to eventual champion Serena Williams. With this result, she was the first Italian woman in the Open Era to reach the semifinals of the US Open, and the first Italian woman ever to come at least into semifinals of two different majors.

Errani and Vinci won the US Open women's doubles final. As of result, she reached the No. 1 spot on 10 September 2012.

At the end of the year she took part in the WTA Championships for the first time in her career, in both singles and doubles. She was the fifth tennis player – on current format – to qualify for the WTA Finals in both singles and doubles, after Svetlana Kuznetsova in 2003, Kim Clijsters in 2004 and the Williams sisters in 2009. In singles, she was defeated in straight sets by Maria Sharapova, but beat Samantha Stosur in the following match. She then lost to fourth seed Agnieszka Radwańska in a match lasting three hours and 29 minutes, which was the longest best-of-three-set match in WTA Championships history. She finished her breakthrough year as No. 6 in the world.

=== 2013: Singles top 5, doubles No. 1 ===
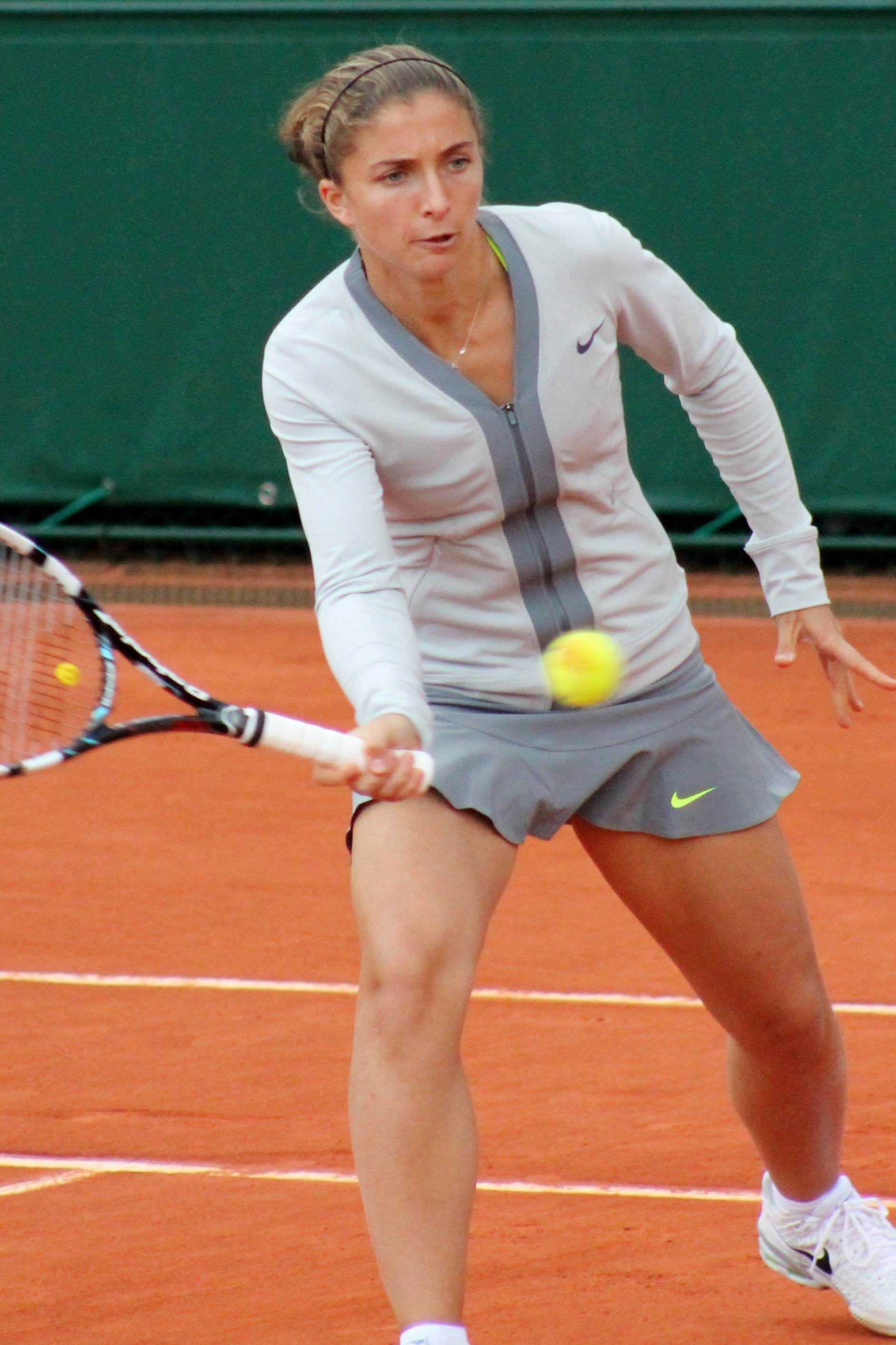
Sara Errani at the 2013 French Open

Errani was the seventh seed at the Australian Open, where she had reached the quarterfinals in 2012. However, she was defeated by Carla Suárez Navarro in the first round. In the doubles tournament, Errani, partnering with Vinci, won her third Grand Slam title, beating Australian wildcards Ashleigh Barty and Casey Dellacqua in the final.

She reached the finals of the Open GDF Suez in Paris, losing to Mona Barthel. At the Qatar Ladies Open, she won her third doubles title of the year, with Vinci, beating Petrova and Srebotnik in the final. One week later, she reached the semifinals of the Dubai Tennis Championship, beating Nadia Petrova in three sets. Here, she defeated her doubles partner Roberta Vinci, reaching her second singles final of the year where she lost to Petra Kvitová in three sets. At the Abierto Mexicano, Errani reached her third final of the year (the second in a row) facing Carla Suárez Navarro. She won the final in two sets, her seventh singles title.

At the Madrid Open, where, defeating Urszula Radwańska, Sorana Cîrstea, Varvara Lepchenko, and Ekaterina Makarova, she reached the semifinals, her first in a WTA Premier Mandatory, where she was beaten by Serena Williams in straight sets. She reached the semifinals at Internazionali d'Italia, where she was defeated by Victoria Azarenka.

As fifth seed, she played at French Open and lost in the semifinals to Serena Williams. In doubles, with Roberta Vinci, she reached her fifth Grand Slam final, losing to the Russian team of Ekaterina Makarova and Elena Vesnina. The following month, she reached the final in Palermo where she was defeated by Roberta Vinci.

She qualified for the Tour Championships for the second consecutive time, either in single and doubles.

=== 2014: WTA 1000 final, doubles career Grand Slam ===
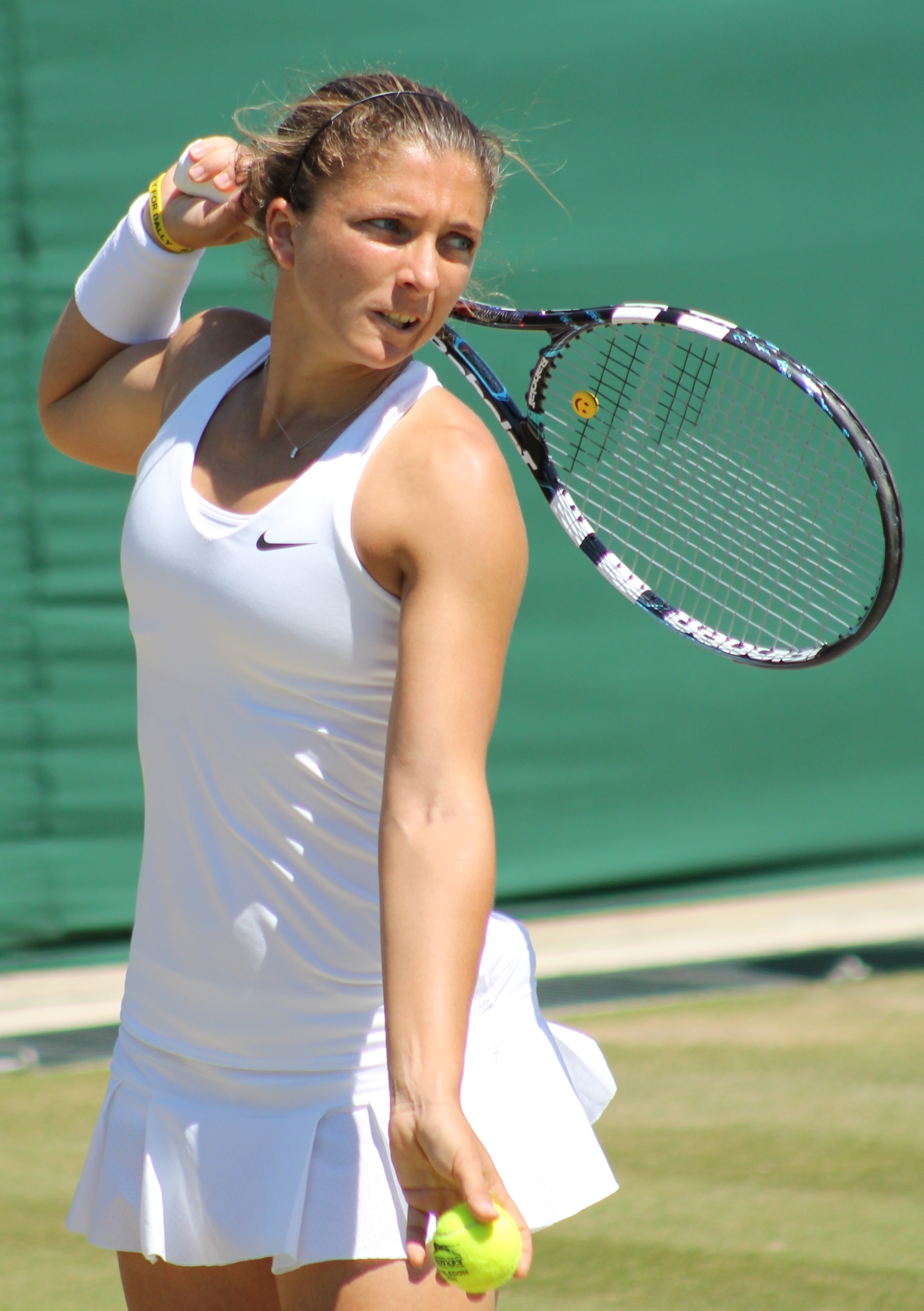
Errani at the 2014 Wimbledon Championships

Errani competed in the Sydney International, where she reached the quarterfinals in singles, and was a finalist in doubles with Roberta Vinci, losing to Tímea Babos and Lucie Šafářová. At the Australian Open, she and Vinci defended their title, defeating first-time Australian Open finalists Ekaterina Makarova and Elena Vesnina in three sets to claim their fourth Grand Slam title. The following week, she lost in the finals at the Open GDF Suez in Paris to Anastasia Pavlyuchenkova in three sets.

At the Miami, she lost in the third round to Ekaterina Makarova, and because of the loss to the Russian in Miami, she left the top 10 after 94 weeks from June 2012.

She reached the semifinals at Porsche Tennis Grand Prix in Stuttgart, and she won the doubles title, partnering with Roberta Vinci, after beating Cara Black and Sania Mirza; they also won their next doubles tournament, the Madrid Open.

At the Internazionali d'Italia, she upset world No. 2 Li Na in three sets for the first time in her career, after losing the previous six meetings and beating a top 3 player for the first time in her career; she reached the finals, after beating in straight sets world No. 8 and former world No. 1, Jelena Janković, then was defeated by Serena Williams.

As the tenth seed, she played at French Open, reaching her third straight quarterfinals. In the doubles, she played alongside Roberta Vinci; they reached their third consecutive final, falling to Hsieh Su-wei and Peng Shuai in straight sets.

At the Wimbledon, Errani and Vinci won the tournament to complete a career Grand Slam. Upon reaching the final, Errani and Vinci reclaimed the number-one ranking in women's doubles after having relinquished the ranking in February to Peng Shuai.

Errani reached the quarterfinals the US Open, her sixth Grand Slam quarterfinal appearance. She qualified, for the third consecutive year, for the Tour Championships in doubles.

=== 2015–2016: Rio Open title in singles ===
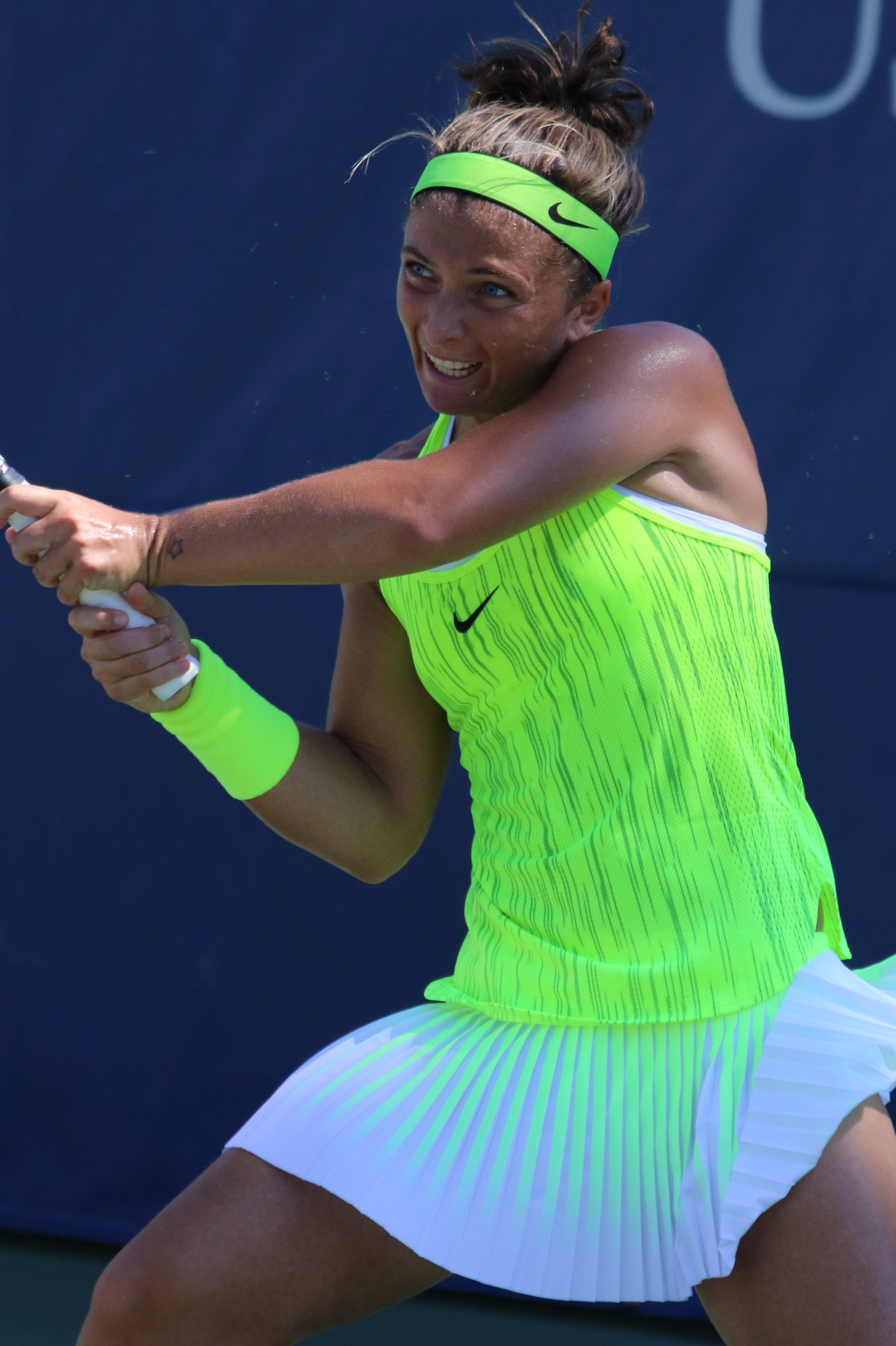
Errani at the 2016 US Open

As the top seed at the 2015 Rio Open, Errani advanced to the finals and beat sixth seed Anna Karolína Schmiedlová. This was Errani's first WTA singles title in two years. Seeded second at the Monterrey Open, Errani reached the semifinals by beating Lauren Davis, qualifier Tímea Babos, and fifth seed Anastasia Pavlyuchenkova. In the semifinals, she was defeated by fourth seed and eventual champion Timea Bacsinszky. Around this time, she suspended the doubles partnership with Roberta Vinci, preferring to dedicate herself to her singles career.

At the Dubai Tennis Championships in 2016, Errani reached the finals and defeated Barbora Strýcová to earn the biggest singles title of her career.

After several losses in early rounds throughout 2016, Errani ended the year ranked 50.

=== 2017–2018: Drugs test failure and suspension ===
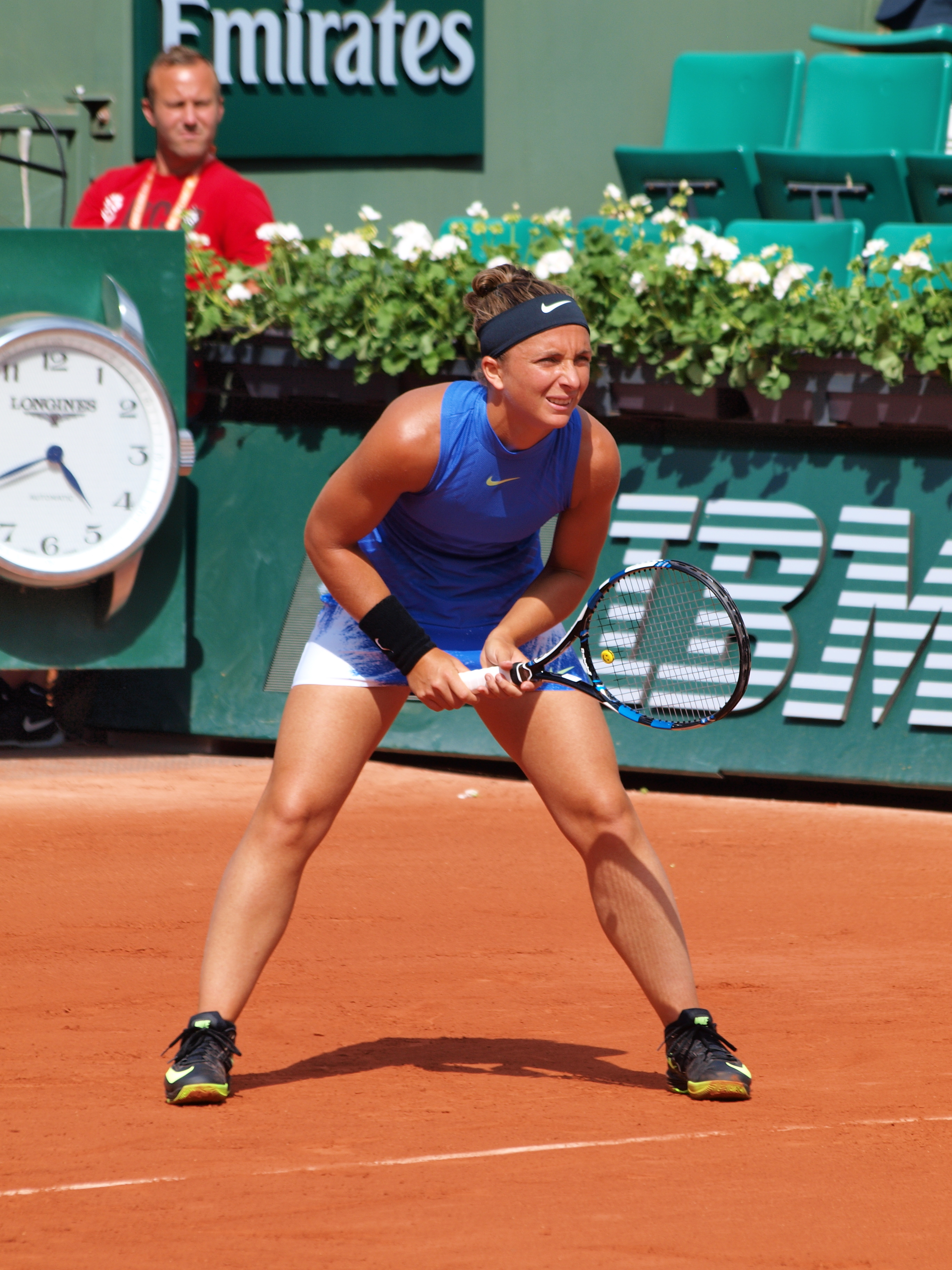
Errani in her second-round match at the 2017 French Open against Kristina Mladenovic

After contending with injuries during the early part of the year, Errani had a solid result by reaching the semifinals at the Morocco Open.

On 7 August 2017, it was announced that Errani would be suspended for two months due to failing a doping test in February 2017, testing positive for the prohibited substance Letrozole. Errani claimed that she likely ingested letrozole by "accidentally consuming her mother's anti-cancer medication Femara" in home-made tortellini while visiting family. As a result, she was suspended for two months, with the ban ending 2 October. All of Errani's results from the date of her positive out-of-competition test on 16 February until a negative test on 7 June were annulled, and all ranking points and prize money accrued in this period were forfeited. Both Errani and Italian anti-doping agency Nado Italia appealed sections of the suspension to the Court of Arbitration for Sport (CAS). Nado Italia sought a longer suspension time frame, whereas Errani sought to have the disqualification of her results overturned. On 11 June 2018, the CAS ruled that Errani's suspension period should be lengthened to 10 months and that the disqualification of her results should stand. In 2012, Errani had already faced questions about her involvement with doping doctor Luis Garcia del Moral.

=== 2020–21: WTA 1000 doubles semifinal ===
Upon returning to Grand Slam tennis Errani was knocked out of the 2020 Australian Open at the first hurdle in the qualifying rounds by Anna Kalinskaya. At the French Open, she fared better by qualifying into the main draw and reaching the second round. After the match, which Errani lost, it was reported she shouted abuse at opponent Kiki Bertens who was being taken off the court in a wheelchair due to injury.

Errani qualified for the 2021 Australian Open and reached the third round, her best showing in four years as she did not participate in the main draw since 2017 and have not reached the third round since 2015. She beat Venus Williams, after Venus injured herself during the match, before she was defeated by Hsieh Su-wei.

At the 2021 Italian Open, Errani reached the semifinals in doubles with Irina-Camelia Begu where they were defeated by Mladenovic/Vondroušová. This was her first participation in a WTA 1000 in two years and first semifinal at this tournament in eight years since reaching the final in 2015, as a result she jumped up by 200 spots in the rankings and reentered the top 200 in the doubles rankings.

=== 2022–24: Olympic gold, Career Golden Slam, BJK Cup title ===
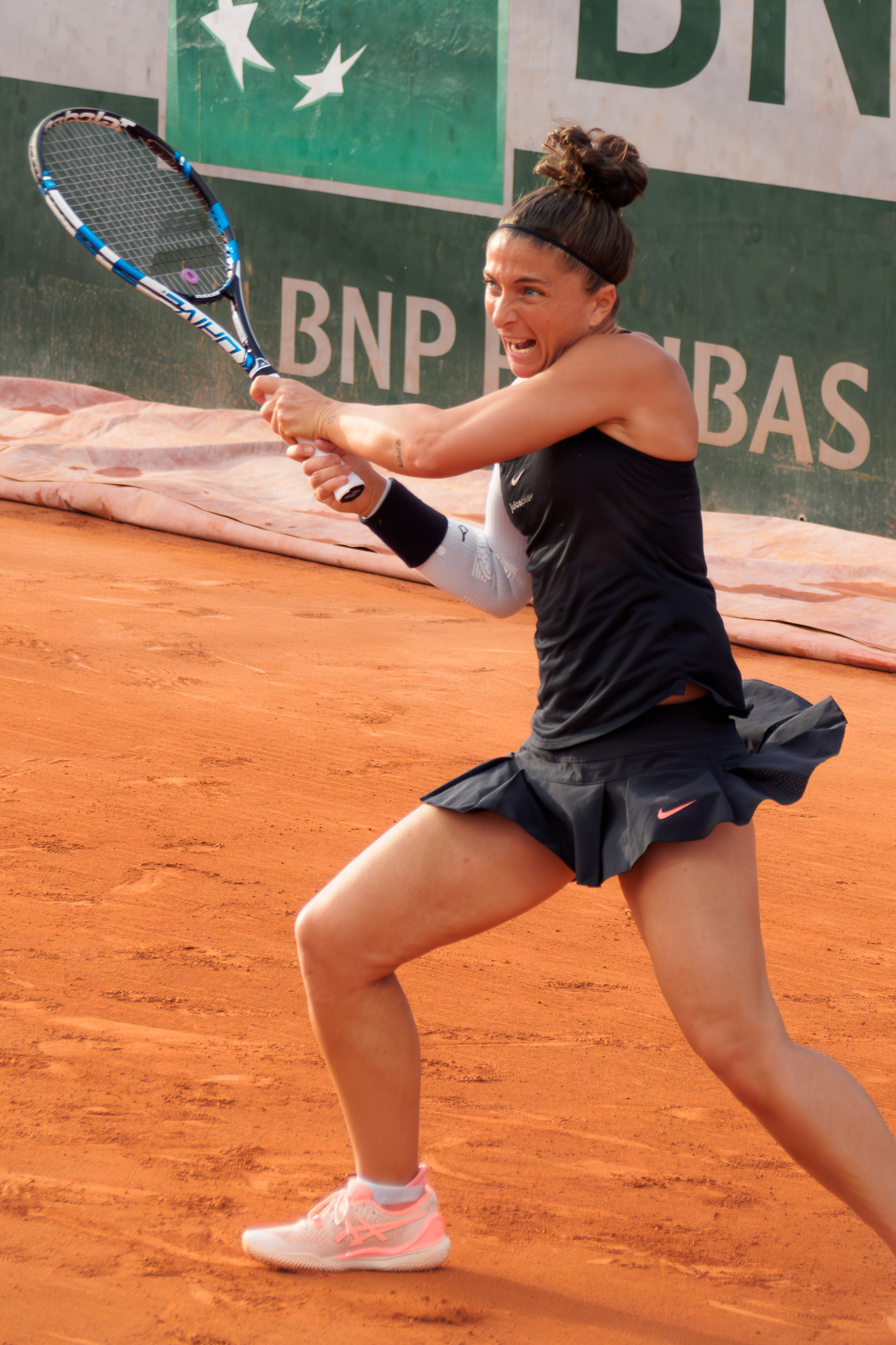
Errani at the 2024 French Open

Partnering with Irina Bara, Errani won the doubles title at the 2022 WTA 125 Argentina Open, defeating Jang Su-jeong and You Xiaodi in the final.

In March 2023, following her ITF title win in Arcadia, California, she returned to the top 100 at world No. 97 in the singles rankings on 6 March 2023 for the first time in more than four years since October 2018.

In May 2023, she received a wildcard for her home WTA 1000 tournament in Rome.

Partnering Léolia Jeanjean, Errani won doubles title at the WTA 125 2023 MundoTenis Open in Brazil, defeating Julia Lohoff and Conny Perrin in the final.

Errani won the singles title at the 2022 WTA 125 Contrexeville in July, overcoming Dalma Gálfi in three sets in the final.

Playing with Jasmine Paolini, she won the doubles title at the 2024 Linz Open, defeating top seeds Nicole Melichar-Martinez and Ellen Perez in a final which went to a deciding champions tiebreak.

At the 2024 Transylvania Open, Errani defeated Caty McNally in straight sets to notch her first WTA tour-level win on indoor hard courts since Luxembourg 2015. She qualified for the Indian Wells Open, her first WTA 1000 for the season.

At the Porsche Tennis Grand Prix in Stuttgart, she qualified with a win over top qualifying seed Anna Kalinskaya but she was defeated by Jasmine Paolini. Errani also qualified for the Madrid Open and recorded her first WTA 1000-level win since 2017 over wildcard Caroline Wozniacki. This was her 194th win on clay, the most tour-level clay-court match-wins of any active player (Venus Williams is second place with 167, Wozniacki is sixth with 109).

Partnering with Jasmine Paolini, she reached the final at her home tournament, the Italian Open in Rome. They won the title defeating third seeds Coco Gauff and Erin Routliffe. At the same tournament, she received a wildcard for the singles main draw for a second consecutive year and defeated Amanda Anisimova, who was using protected ranking. The Italian duo followed up their success in Rome with a runner-up finish at the 2024 French Open, losing the final to Coco Gauff and Katerina Siniakova.

At the Paris Olympics Errani and Paolini won the gold medal in doubles defeating Mirra Andreeva and Diana Shnaider, completing a career Golden Slam, becoming the seventh woman to achieve the feat in doubles.

At the US Open, she recorded a first-round singles win over Cristina Bucsa and became the Italian woman with the third-most major singles matches won in the Open era. She then defeated Caroline Dolehide to reach her first third round at this major since 2015, and first at any Major since the 2021 Australian Open. Partnering Andrea Vavassori, she won the mixed doubles title, defeating Taylor Townsend and Donald Young in the final.

In October, Errani and Paolini won the 2024 China Open, defeating Chan Hao-ching and Veronika Kudermetova in the final. They qualified for the end-of-season 2024 WTA Finals but exited in the group stages after compiling a record of one win and two losses.

At the 2024 Billie Jean King Cup finals in Spain, Errani teamed with Jasmine Paolini to defeat Shuko Aoyama and Eri Hozumi in the deciding doubles match as Italy won their quarterfinal tie against Japan. Italy faced Poland in the semifinals and Errani again combined again with Jasmine Paolini to defeat Katarzyna Kawa and Iga Świątek in the decisive doubles and secure a place in the final. Italy defeated Slovakia in the final, although Errani was not required to play as her team won both singles matches to claim the title.

In December, Errani and Paolini were named WTA Doubles Team of the Year.

=== 2025: Retirement in singles, three mixed titles ===
Errani and Jasmine Paolini won their third WTA 1000 doubles title together at the Qatar Open, defeating Jiang Xinyu and Wu Fang-hsien in the final.

Partnering Andrea Vavassori, she won the invitational mixed doubles at Indian Wells. Teaming up with Paolini, she won the doubles title at the Italian Open for the second year in a row.

At the French Open, with Paolini, she won her sixth Grand Slam doubles title, and alongside Vavassori claimed the mixed doubles title. At the same tournament, Errani played her last professional singles match, losing in the second round of the qualifying tournament to Anna-Lena Friedsam.

Errani and Vavassori also defended their US Open mixed doubles title, overcoming Iga Świątek and Casper Ruud in the final. At the China Open, she and Paolini defeated Miyu Kato and Fanny Stollár in the final to claim their third WTA 1000 trophy of the year.

With Paolini, she qualified for the doubles event at the WTA Finals in Riyadh. Despite going into the tournament as top seeds, they were eliminated in the group stages.

=== 2026: Second French Open mixed title ===
In March at the Miami Open, Errani and Jasmine Pasolini were runners-up in the doubles, losing in the final to Kateřina Siniaková and Taylor Townsend. At the French Open, she and Andrea Vavassori defended their mixed doubles title from 12 months earlier, defeating Evan King and Gabriela Dabrowski in the final.

Playing alongside Nicole Melichar-Martinez, Errani reached the finals at the Berlin Open, where they lost to Ekaterina Alexandrova and Linda Nosková, and the Canadian Open, losing to top seeds Kateřina Siniaková and Zhang Shuai.

Reunited with Jasmine Paolini, Errani won the doubles title at the Pan Pacific Open, defeating top seeds Gabriela Dabrowski and Luisa Stefani in the final. They also secured a spot at the end of season WTA Finals for the third consecutive year when they overcame Tereza Mihalikova and Olivia Nicholls in the semifinals. Two weeks later at the Finals in Indian Wells, Errani and Paolini topped their group by winning all three of their round-robin matches, before defeating Hanyu Guo and Kristina Mladenovic to reach the final for the first time. They lost the championship match to Kateřina Siniaková and Taylor Townsend.

== Playing style ==
During the 2012 season, and for a few years after, Errani became known for producing a high first-serve percentage, being no.1 on the year-end statistics. Having won multiple titles on clay, she is widely recognized as a clay-court specialist and is known for her use of strategy on the surface, including her tendency to position herself well and to return serves early. Being a doubles specialist as well, she is noted for her speed around the court and for hitting the ball with a lot of spin, as well as for her deep and loopy groundstrokes.

== Career statistics ==
=== Grand Slam performance timelines ===
Key
W	F	SF	QF	#R	RR	Q#	DNQ	A	NH

(W) winner; (F) finalist; (SF) semifinalist; (QF) quarterfinalist; (#R) rounds 4, 3, 2, 1; (RR) round-robin stage; (Q#) qualification round; (DNQ) did not qualify; (A) absent; (NH) not held; (SR) strike rate (events won / competed); (W–L) win–loss record.
To avoid confusion and double counting, these charts are updated at the conclusion of a tournament or when the player's participation has ended.

==== Singles ====
Tournament	2006	2007	2008	2009	2010	2011	2012	2013	2014	2015	2016	2017	2018	2019	2020	2021	2022	2023	2024	2025	SR	W–L	Win%
Australian Open	A	Q1	1R	3R	3R	1R	QF	1R	1R	3R	1R	2R	Q3	A	Q1	3R	Q1	Q1	1R	Q2	0 / 12	13–12	52%
French Open	A	Q1	1R	1R	1R	2R	F	SF	QF	QF	1R	2R	1R	A	2R	Q2	Q2	2R	2R	Q2	0 / 14	24–14	63%
Wimbledon	Q1	A	1R	2R	3R	2R	3R	1R	1R	2R	2R	1R	A	A	NH	Q1	Q1	1R	1R	A	0 / 12	8–12	40%
US Open	Q1	2R	2R	3R	3R	1R	SF	2R	QF	3R	1R	A	A	A	A	1R	Q1	Q1	3R	A	0 / 12	20–12	63%
Win–loss	0–0	1–1	1–4	5–4	6–4	2–4	17–4	6–4	8–4	9–4	1–4	2–3	0–1	0–0	1–1	2–2	0–0	1–2	3–4	0–0	0 / 50	65–50	57%

==== Doubles ====
Tournament	2008	2009	2010	2011	2012	2013	2014	2015	2016	2017	2018	...	2021	2022	2023	2024	2025	2026	SR	W–L	Win%
Australian Open	1R	1R	1R	1R	F	W	W	3R	1R	2R (Note: Errani withdrew before the second round of the 2017 French Open doubles, which does not officially count as a loss.)	A		A	A	A	3R	2R	2R	2 / 13	24–10	71%
French Open	2R	2R	2R	3R	W	F	F	A	1R	A	2R		A	A	1R	F	W	2R	2 / 13	34–11	76%
Wimbledon	2R	2R	3R	3R	QF	3R	W	A	1R	A	A		A	A	1R	3R	2R		1 / 11	20–10	67%
US Open	1R	1R	1R	QF	W	QF	2R	SF	A	A	A		1R	A	A	2R	SF		1 / 11	22–10	69%
Win–loss	2–4	2–4	3–4	7–4	20–2	16–3	18–2	6–2	0–3	1–0	1–1		0–1	0–0	0–2	10–4	12–3	2–2	6 / 46	100–41	71%

=== Grand Slam tournament finals ===
==== Singles: 1 (runner-up) ====
Result	Year	Tournament	Surface	Opponent	Score
Loss	2012	French Open	Clay	(Russia) Maria Sharapova	3–6, 2–6

==== Doubles: 10 (6 titles, 4 runner-ups) ====
Result	Year	Tournament	Surface	Partner	Opponents	Score
Loss	2012	Australian Open	Hard	(Italy) Roberta Vinci	(Russia) Svetlana Kuznetsova (Russia) Vera Zvonareva	7–5, 4–6, 3–6
Win	2012	French Open	Clay	(Italy) Roberta Vinci	(Russia) Maria Kirilenko (Russia) Nadia Petrova	4–6, 6–4, 6–2
Win	2012	US Open	Hard	(Italy) Roberta Vinci	(Czech Republic) Andrea Hlaváčková (Czech Republic) Lucie Hradecká	6–4, 6–2
Win	2013	Australian Open	Hard	(Italy) Roberta Vinci	(Australia) Ashleigh Barty (Australia) Casey Dellacqua	6–2, 3–6, 6–2
Loss	2013	French Open	Clay	(Italy) Roberta Vinci	(Russia) Ekaterina Makarova (Russia) Elena Vesnina	5–7, 2–6
Win	2014	Australian Open (2)	Hard	(Italy) Roberta Vinci	(Russia) Ekaterina Makarova (Russia) Elena Vesnina	6–4, 3–6, 7–5
Loss	2014	French Open	Clay	(Italy) Roberta Vinci	(Chinese Taipei) Hsieh Su-wei (China) Peng Shuai	4–6, 1–6
Win	2014	Wimbledon	Grass	(Italy) Roberta Vinci	(Hungary) Tímea Babos (France) Kristina Mladenovic	6–1, 6–3
Loss	2024	French Open	Clay	(Italy) Jasmine Paolini	(United States) Coco Gauff (Czech Republic) Kateřina Siniaková	6–7^{(5–7)}, 3–6
Win	2025	French Open (2)	Clay	(Italy) Jasmine Paolini	(Kazakhstan) Anna Danilina (Serbia) Aleksandra Krunić	6–4, 2–6, 6–1

==== Mixed doubles: 4 (4 titles) ====
Result	Year	Tournament	Surface	Partner	Opponents	Score
Win	2024	US Open	Hard	(Italy) Andrea Vavassori	(United States) Donald Young (United States) Taylor Townsend	7–6^{(7–0)}, 7–5
Win	2025	French Open	Clay	(Italy) Andrea Vavassori	(United States) Evan King (United States) Taylor Townsend	6–4, 6–2
Win	2025	US Open (2)	Hard	(Italy) Andrea Vavassori	(Norway) Casper Ruud (Poland) Iga Świątek	6–3, 5–7, [10–6]
Win	2026	French Open (2)	Clay	(Italy) Andrea Vavassori	(United States) Evan King (Canada) Gabriela Dabrowski	4–6, 6–3, [10–4]

=== Year-end championships ===
==== Doubles: 1 (runner-up) ====
Result	Year	Tournament	Surface	Partner	Opponents	Score
Loss	2026	WTA Finals, US	Hard	(Italy) Jasmine Paolini	(Czech Republic) Kateřina Siniaková (United States) Taylor Townsend	4–6, 3–6

=== Summer Olympics medal matches ===
==== Doubles: 1 (gold medal) ====
Result	Year	Tournament	Surface	Partner	Opponents	Score
Gold	2024	Paris Olympics	Clay	(Italy) Jasmine Paolini	Mirra Andreeva; Diana Shnaider	2–6, 6–1, [10–7]

== See also ==
- Tennis in Italy

Awards
Preceded by (Czech Republic) Petra Kvitová	WTA Most Improved Player; 2012	Succeeded by (Romania) Simona Halep
Preceded by (Slovenia) Katarina Srebotnik & (Czech Republic) Květa Peschke (Australia) Storm Hunter & (Belgium) Elise Mertens	WTA Doubles Team of the Year; 2012 – 2014 (with (Italy) Roberta Vinci); 2024 (with (Italy) Jasmine Paolini)	Succeeded by (Switzerland) Martina Hingis & (India) Sania Mirza; Incumbent
Preceded by (Slovenia) Katarina Srebotnik & (Czech Republic) Květa Peschke	ITF Women's Doubles World Champions; 2012 – 2014 (with (Italy) Roberta Vinci)	Succeeded by (Switzerland) Martina Hingis & (India) Sania Mirza
Preceded by (Russia) Ekaterina Makarova & (Russia) Elena Vesnina	WTA Fan Favorite Doubles Team of the Year; 2014 (with (Italy) Roberta Vinci)	Succeeded by (United States) Serena Williams & (Denmark) Caroline Wozniacki
