= Kateřina Siniaková =

Czech tennis player (born 1996)

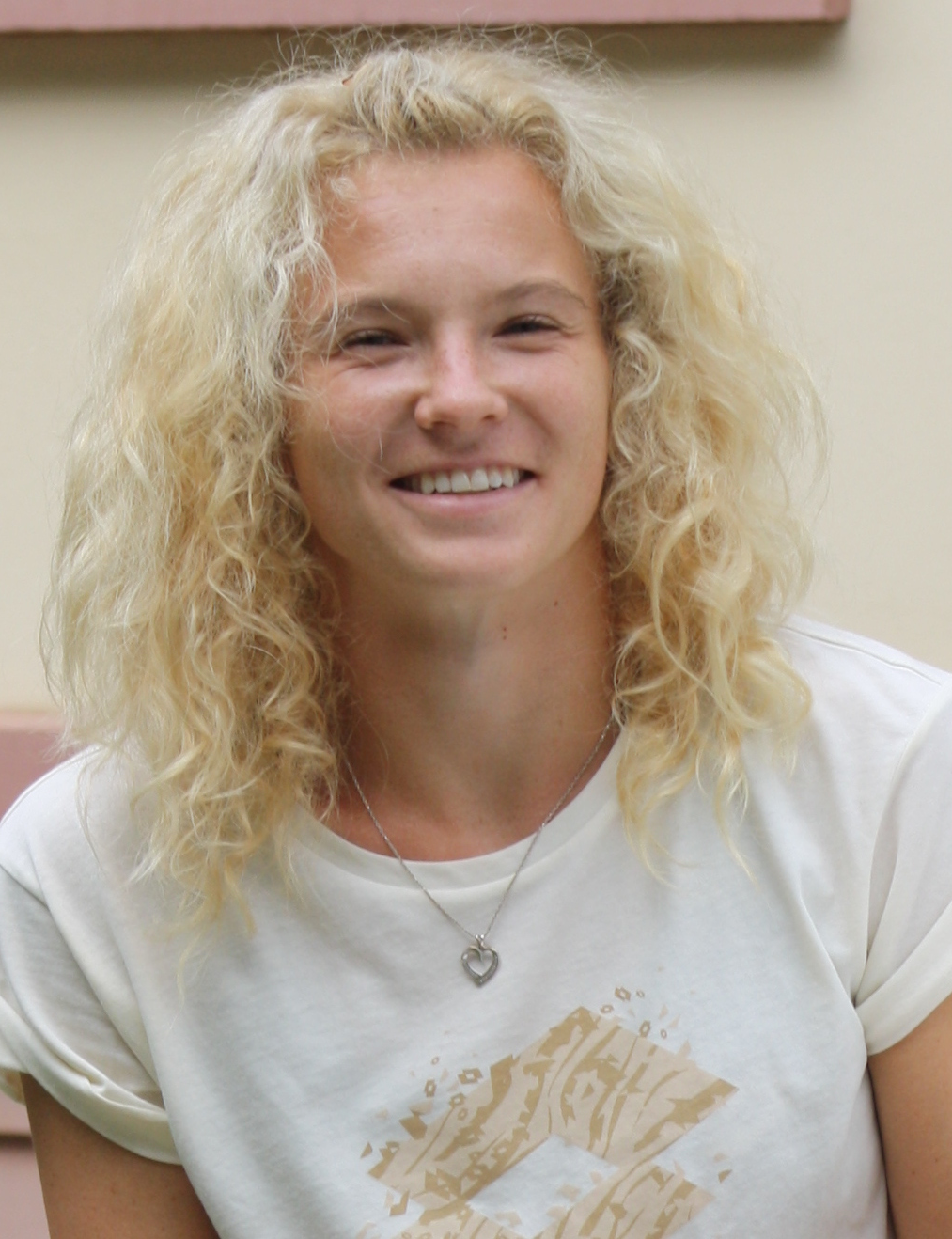
- Siniaková in 2023
- Country (sports): Czech Republic
- Residence: Hradec Králové, Czech Republic
- Born: 10 May 1996 (age 30) Hradec Králové, Czech Republic
- Height: 1.74 m (5 ft 9 in)
- Plays: Right-handed (two-handed backhand)
- Coach: Dmitri Siniakov
- Prize money: US$ 18,690,649: 35th in all-time rankings
- Official website: siniakovakaterina.com

Singles
- Career record: 419–302
- Career titles: 6
- Highest ranking: No. 27 (24 June 2024)
- Current ranking: No. 48 (16 November 2026)

Grand Slam singles results
- Australian Open: 2R (2015, 2018, 2024, 2026)
- French Open: 4R (2019)
- Wimbledon: 3R (2016, 2018, 2021)
- US Open: 3R (2018)

Other tournaments
- Olympic Games: 1R (2024)

Doubles
- Career record: 446–167
- Career titles: 40
- Highest ranking: No. 1 (22 October 2018)
- Current ranking: No. 1 (16 November 2026)

Grand Slam doubles results
- Australian Open: W (2022, 2023, 2025)
- French Open: W (2018, 2021, 2024, 2026)
- Wimbledon: W (2018, 2022, 2024)
- US Open: W (2022, 2026)

Other doubles tournaments
- Tour Finals: W (2021, 2026)
- Olympic Games: W (2021)

Mixed doubles
- Career titles: 2

Grand Slam mixed doubles results
- Australian Open: QF (2026)
- French Open: 1R (2018, 2024, 2025)
- Wimbledon: W (2025)
- US Open: QF (2026)

Other mixed doubles tournaments
- Olympic Games: W (2024)

Team competitions
- BJK Cup: W (2018, 2026), record 10–8
Medal record
Representing Czech Republic
Olympic Games
Gold medal – first place	2020 Tokyo	Women's doubles
Gold medal – first place	2024 Paris	Mixed doubles
- Last updated on: 16 November 2026.

Kateřina Siniaková (Czech pronunciation: [ˈkatɛr̝ɪna ˈsɪɲakovaː]; born 10 May 1996) is a Czech professional tennis player. She is the world No. 1 in women's doubles, having held the top spot for a total of 209 weeks (second-most of all time), behind Martina Navratilova, and has finished as year-end No. 1 a record six times. She has also been ranked as high as world No. 27 in singles by the Women's Tennis Association (WTA), reached in June 2024.

Siniaková is a twelve-time major champion in women's doubles and one-time champion in mixed doubles. She won seven major titles in her longtime partnership with compatriot Barbora Krejčíková, with whom she completed the career Golden Slam. She has won five other women's doubles majors, one with Coco Gauff and four with Taylor Townsend to complete a second career Grand Slam, as well as one mixed doubles major partnering Sem Verbeek.

Siniaková became the world No. 1 for the first time in October 2018.

Siniaková has won 40 doubles titles on the WTA Tour, including a gold medal at the 2020 Tokyo Olympics, 2021 WTA Finals, 2026 WTA Finals, and ten WTA 1000 events.

In singles, Siniaková has won six WTA Tour titles. Her best singles major result was at the 2019 French Open, upsetting world No. 1 Naomi Osaka en route to the fourth round; she has reached the third round at seven other major tournaments.

Siniaková was part of the Czech team that won the 2018 Fed Cup and 2026 Billie Jean King Cup. She also has won two Olympic gold medals: in women's doubles at the 2020 Tokyo Olympics with Krejčíková, and in mixed doubles at the 2024 Paris Olympics with Tomáš Macháč.

== Personal life and background ==
Siniaková was born to a Czech mother Hana, an accountant, and Russian father Dmitry Siniakov, a former boxer and her coach. Her younger brother Daniel (born 2003) is also a professional tennis player. Since the COVID-19 quarantine at the 2021 Australian Open, Siniaková had been dating fellow Czech tennis player Tomáš Macháč. In July 2024, Siniaková confirmed they broke up.

== Career ==
=== Juniors ===
She was ranked the world No. 2 junior tennis player in December 2012. With fellow Czech Barbora Krejčíková, she won the girls' doubles titles at the French Open, at Wimbledon and the US Open in 2013.

=== 2012–14: First WTA Tour doubles title ===
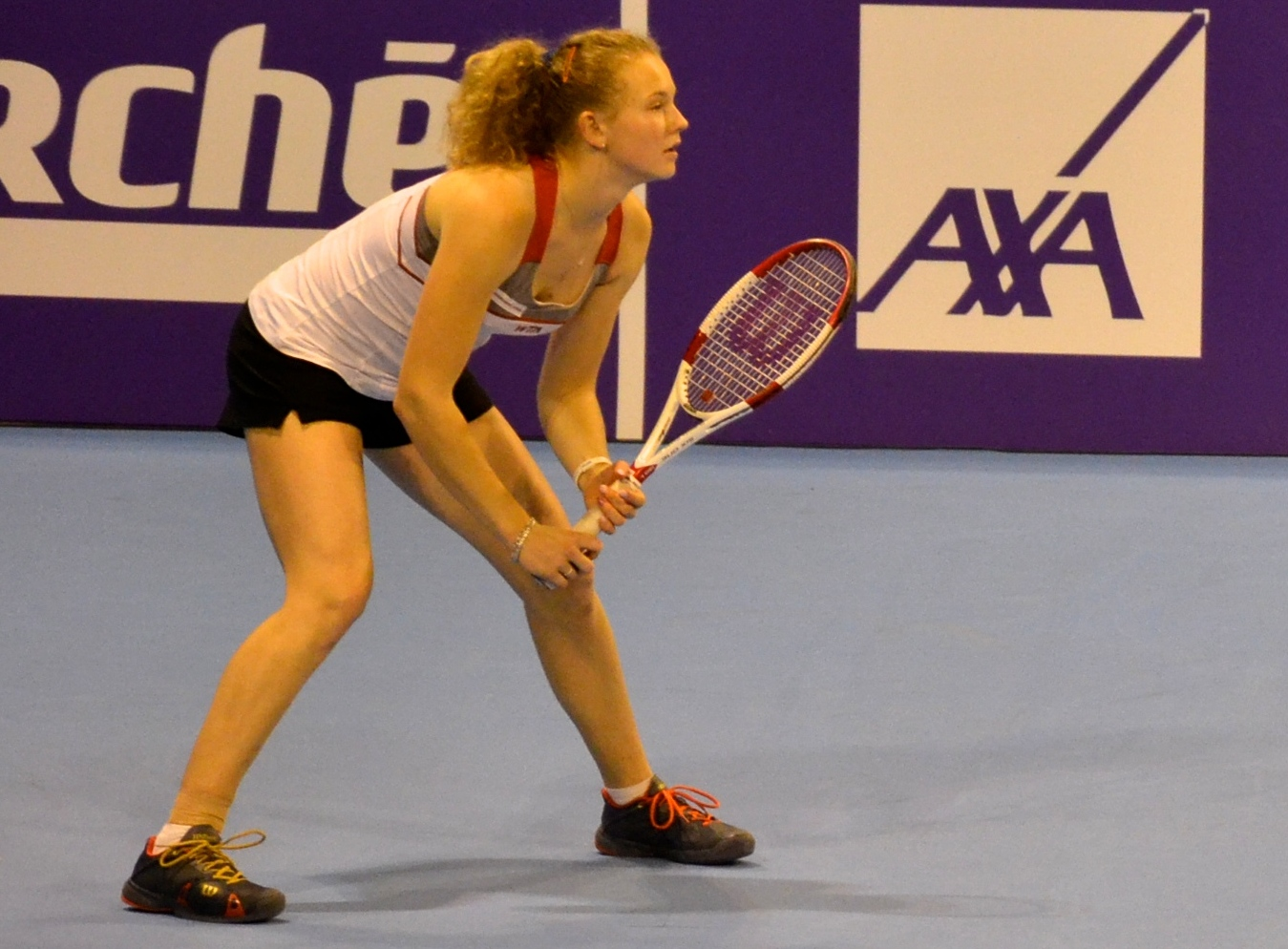
Siniaková at the 2014 Open de Limoges, where she won the doubles title with Renata Voráčová.

She began playing on the ITF Women's Circuit in the Czech Republic in June 2012. There in a doubles competition, she won her first ITF title. She then made big progress in 2013. She started outside top 1000 in both singles and doubles, but finished year inside top 200 in singles and top 300 in doubles. In March 2013, she won her first ITF singles title at the $10k Frauenfeld, defeating Kathinka von Deichmann in the three sets. Two weeks later, Siniaková made her debut on the WTA Tour in the qualifying draw of Miami Open. She passed qualifying defeating Mandy Minella and Alexa Glatch, but then lost a three-set encounter with Garbiñe Muguruza in the first round of the main draw. In November 2013, she reached her first major ITF final at the $75k Sharm El Sheikh event in doubles, but lost alongside Anna Morgina.

At the 2014 Australian Open, she made her major debut, after passing qualifying but then lost to Zarina Diyas in the first round of the main draw. In July 2014, she won her first match on WTA Tour at the İstanbul Cup defeating Julia Glushko in the first round. Nearly after that, she reached her first WTA doubles final at the Silicon Valley Classic alongside Paula Kania, but they lost to Garbiñe Muguruza and Carla Suárez Navarro. She then went one step further, winning her first WTA doubles title at the Tashkent Open, partnering Aleksandra Krunić. Right after that she made her top 100 debut in doubles. In October 2014, she reached singles semifinals of the Premier-level Kremlin Cup but lost her match against Anastasia Pavlyuchenkova. This brought her into the top 100 in singles, and a week later, she won the title at the $50k Open Nantes Atlantique defeating Ons Jabeur. She finished year with another title at the Open de Limoges, alongside Renata Voráčová.

=== 2015–16: Singles and doubles top 50 ===
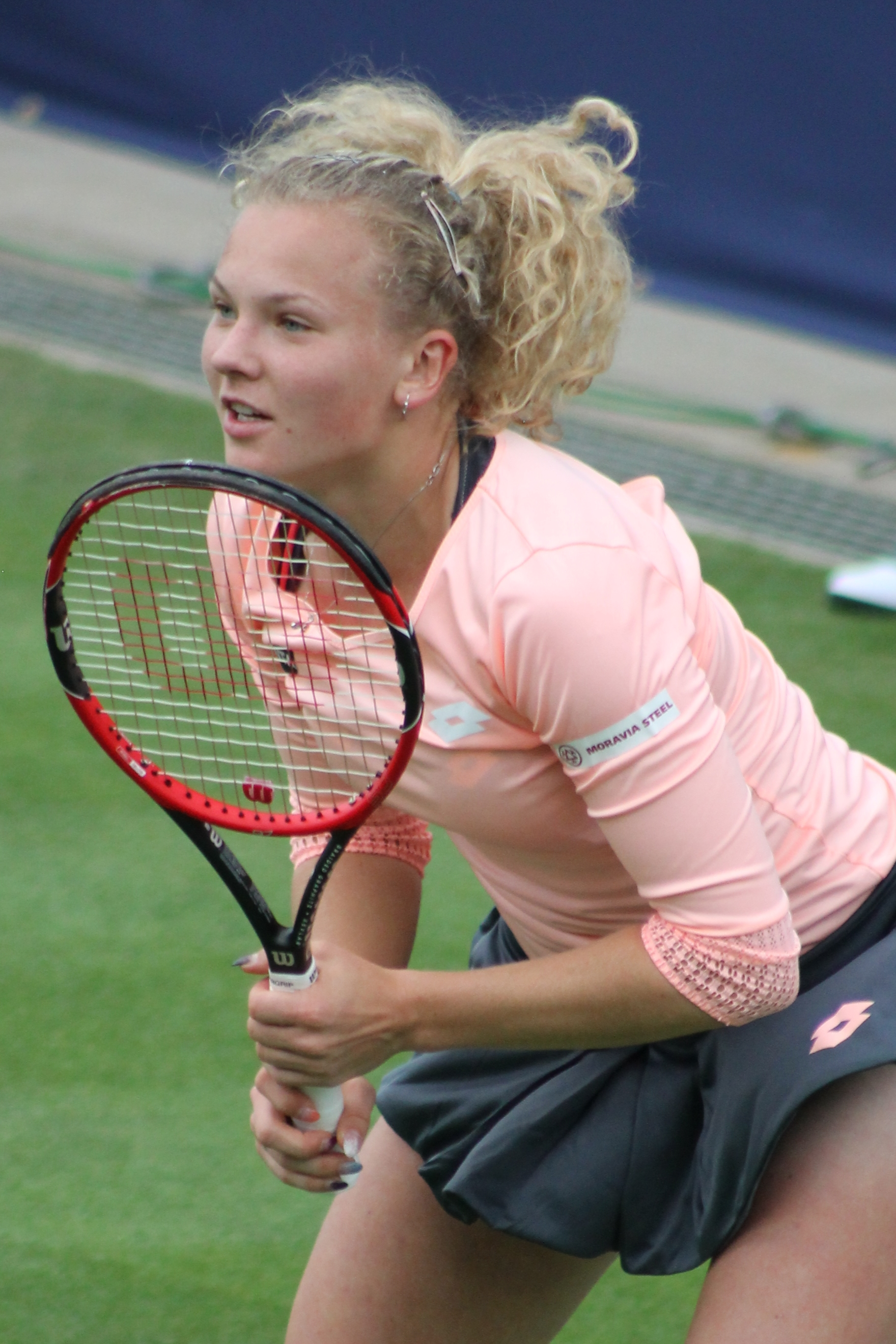
Siniaková at Birmingham, 2016.

At the Australian Open, Siniaková had her first singles Grand Slam win, defeating Elena Vesnina in the first round. In the following round, she lost to Irina-Camelia Begu. In March 2015, she won her first WTA 1000 match at the Premier Mandatory-level Indian Wells Open, defeating another Russian player, Evgeniya Rodina. In May 2015, she had good performances, reaching the singles semifinal and taking the doubles title with Belinda Bencic at the Prague Open. However, after a run to the third-round at the French Open alongside Bencic, she reached top 50. In June 2015, she reached the quarterfinal of the Premier-level Birmingham Classic. By the end of the year, she was standing out more in doubles, reaching final of the Tashkent Open and semifinal of the Premier-level Kremlin Cup.

Siniaková started slowly into the 2016 season, but then shone at the French Open, where she reached semifinals in doubles alongside Barbora Krejčíková. Then, at 2016 Wimbledon, she reached her first singles Grand Slam third round, after defeating Pauline Parmentier and 30th seed Caroline Garcia before being defeated by former world No. 2, Agnieszka Radwańska. Things even got better in July 2016, when she reached her first singles WTA final in Båstad, at the Swedish Open. She lost the final to Laura Siegemund. But then she advanced to the doubles quarterfinals of the US Open, alongside Krejčíková. She followed this up with another singles WTA final at the Japan Women's Open in Tokyo, but lost to Christina McHale. In late October, after a first-round loss at the Kremlin Cup, she made her top-50 debut in singles.

=== 2017: Career singles titles, US Open doubles final ===
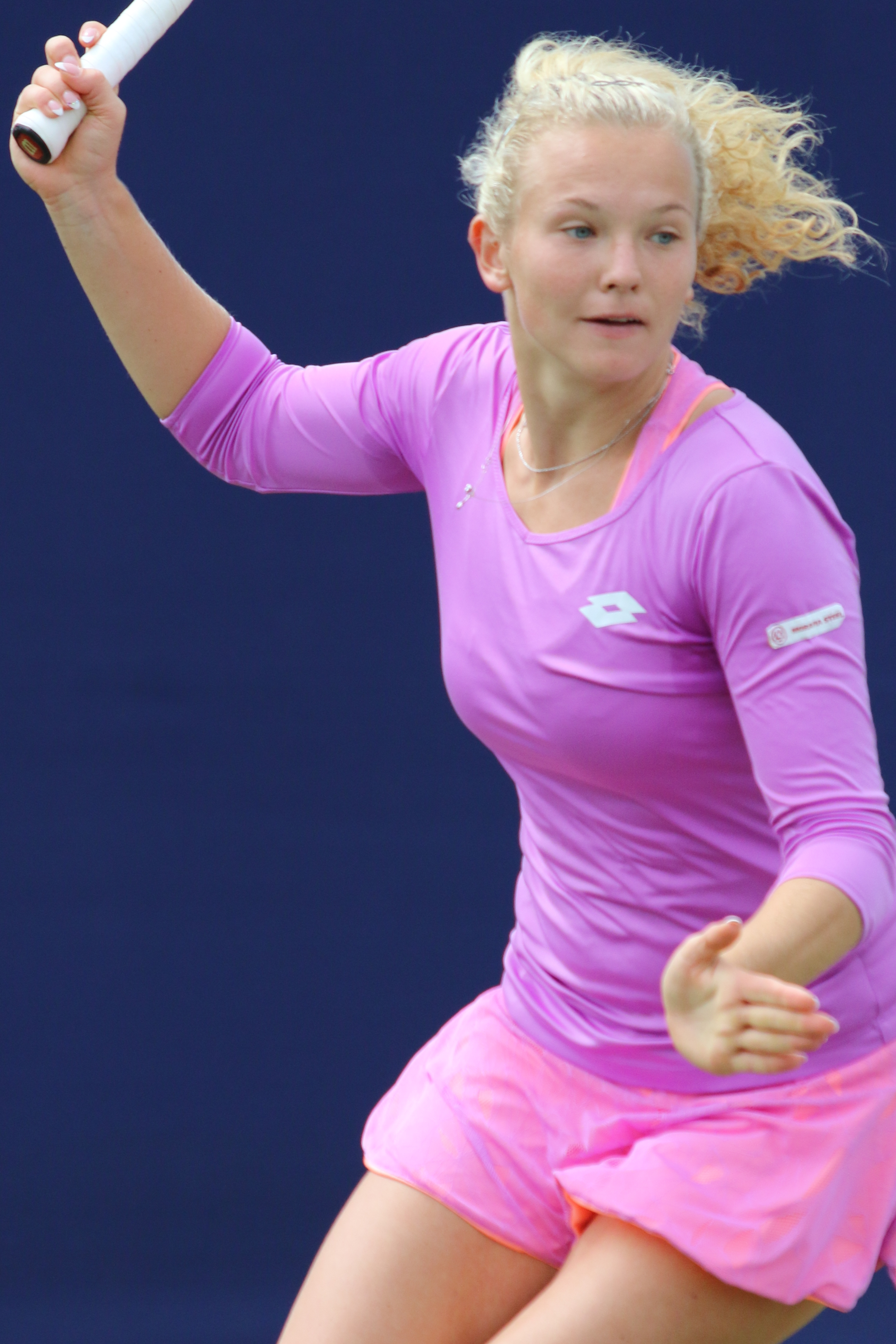
Siniaková at the 2017 Aegon International Eastbourne.

Siniaková had a strong start to the 2017 season, winning her first WTA singles title at the Shenzhen Open. Siniaková began the tournament by defeating Peng Shuai in the first round in two sets, followed by a victory over world No. 4, Simona Halep in three sets, claiming her first win over a top-10 player. Her run continued by beating qualifier Nina Stojanović and world No. 9, Johanna Konta, in three sets. In the final, she defeated Alison Riske to take the title. She then struggled with results, not even reaching a quarterfinal until May 2017. However, during that period, she had success in doubles where she reached the final of Indian Wells and the Premier-level Charleston Open alongside Lucie Hradecká. Then in May 2017, she reached the quarterfinal of the Prague Open in singles, as well as the final in doubles. She continued this form, with good results in doubles, reaching the quarterfinals of the Premier Mandatory Madrid Open and Premier 5 Italian Open with Hradecka. She then reached the doubles semifinal of the French Open for the second year in a row, alongside Lucie Hradecká.

However, in singles, things still were not good until Swedish Open, where she reached her second final. A losing finalist in 2016, this time she succeeded in winning the title, after she defeated world No. 6, Caroline Wozniacki, in the final. On her way to the title, she also defeated two top-20 players, Anastasija Sevastova and Caroline Garcia. She then continued struggling with results in singles, but made did make progress in doubles. At the US Open, she reached her first major doubles final. Alongside Lucie Hradecká, she did not drop a singles set on the way to the final, but then they lost to Latisha Chan and Martina Hingis. Later in the year, she reached the quarterfinal of the Premier-Mandatory China Open and semifinal of the Premier-level Kremlin Cup in doubles. As a result of that, she achieved No. 11 ranking in doubles and finished year as world No. 13, while in singles she ended as world No. 49.

=== 2018: Doubles: No. 1 and two major titles ===
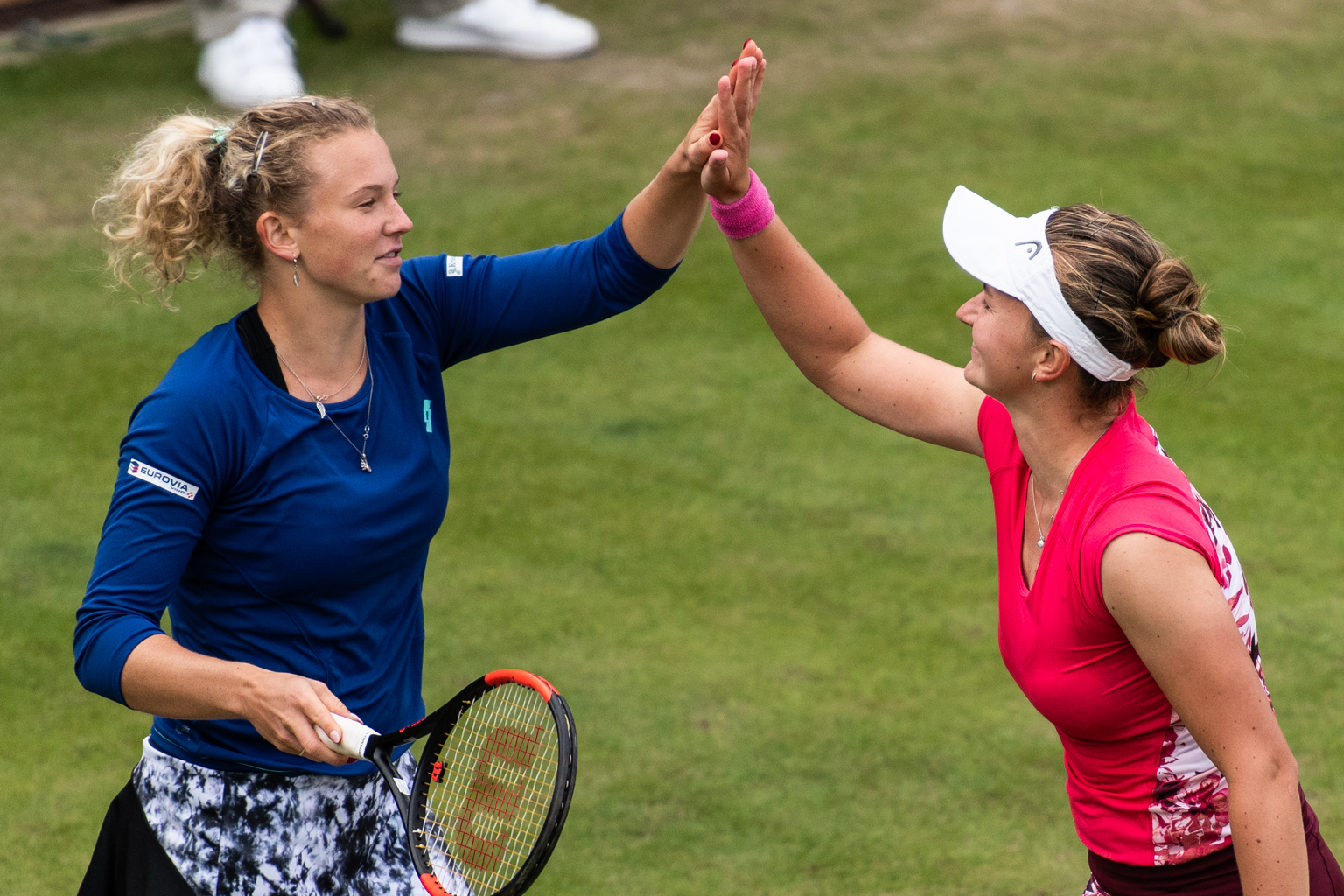
Siniaková (left) and Krejčíková won the French and Wimbledon titles in 2018.

Siniaková started year well, playing at the Shenzhen Open where she reached the finals in both singles and doubles, but lost to Simona Halep in both. Her run to the singles final included a semifinal-win over Maria Sharapova. She played in the doubles final alongside Krejčíková, but they lost to Halep and Irina-Camelia Begu. She then lost to Elina Svitolina in the first-round match at the Australian Open, and in doubles reached the third round with Krejčíková. Siniaková then reached the quarterfinals in singles at the Premier-level St. Petersburg Ladies' Trophy, and then in May, she reached the quarterfinal of the Prague Open and the semifinal of the Nuremberg Cup. During that period, things got better in doubles where she first reached the semifinals of the Premier 5 Qatar Ladies Open and then the final of the Premier Mandatory Miami Open.

In the summer, she had her biggest success in doubles. Alongside Krejčíková, she won two major titles at the French Open and Wimbledon.

At the US Open, Siniaková reached the third round in singles, and made the semifinals in doubles, alongside Krejčíková. During the Asian hardcourt tour, Siniaková alsö improved her singles results. First, she reached the quarterfinal of the Premier 5 Wuhan Open, where she also defeated world No. 4, Caroline Garcia, and former No. 1, Garbiñe Muguruza. She followed this up with another quarterfinal, but this time at the Premier Mandatory China Open where she defeated world No. 11, Kiki Bertens, but later lost to world No. 2, Caroline Wozniacki. She reached the final of the Tour Championships in doubles, alongside Krejčíková, but they lost to Tímea Babos and Kristina Mladenovic. On 22 October 2018, Siniaková became world No. 1 in doubles, along with Krejčíková. She finished the year with the same positions, in singles and in doubles.

In November, Siniaková won two matches, including the decisive third, as the Czech Republic defeated the USA 3–0 to win the Fed Cup final.

=== 2019–20: Success in doubles ===
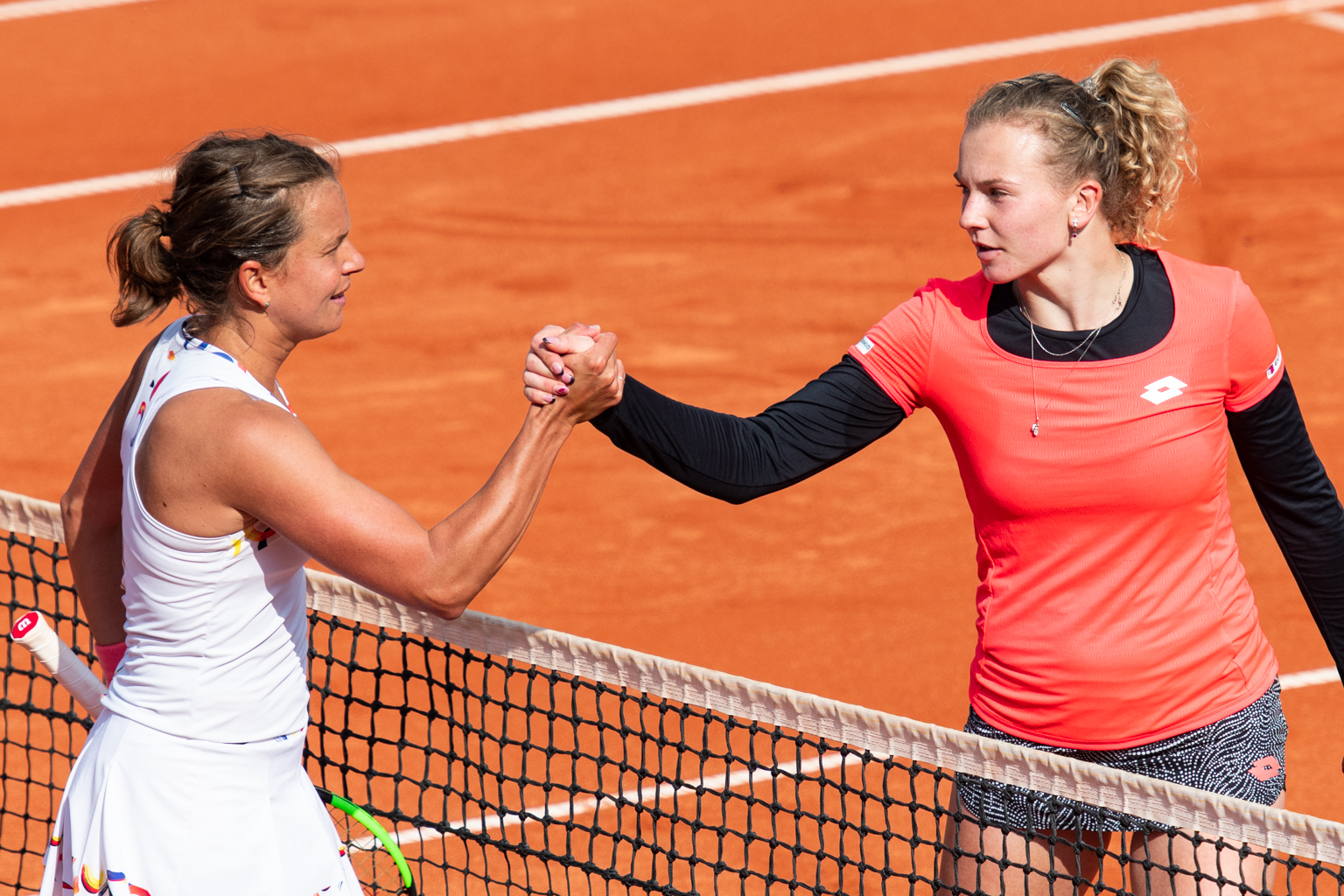
Siniaková (right) after losing to Strycová in the quarterfinals of the 2019 Prague Open

During the first four months of 2019, Siniaková did not have any significant results in singles, but was more successful in doubles. She started year with the semifinal of the Premier-level Brisbane International, followed with title at another Premier-level tournament, Sydney International with Krejčíková. Then, at the Australian Open, alongside Krejčíková, she reached the quarterfinal and completed reaching the quarterfinals at all four Grand Slam tournaments. She did not stop there, reaching quarterfinal of the Premier 5 Dubai Championships and soon after that the final of the Premier Mandatory Indian Wells Open. Then, on clay court, she started with better results in singles, first reaching quarterfinal of the Prague Open, followed by semifinal at Nuremberg. She lost early in singles, at the Madrid Open and at the Italian Open, but she reached the doubles quarterfinals in Madrid and the doubles semifinals in Rome. Siniaková then made progress at the French Open, by defeating world No. 1, Naomi Osaka.in order to reach her first Grand Slam singles round of 16. She then lost to Madison Keys in the quarterfinal-match. The following month, she continued to struggle with results in singles, but reached the semifinal of Wimbledon in doubles with Krejčíková. In late August, she reached another WTA Tour singles semifinal at the Bronx Open. However, by the end of the year, she continued to struggle in singles, but in doubles she and Krejčíková won the Canadian Open and Linz Open. At the WTA Finals, alongside Krejčíková, she exited in the round-robin stage, after winning one match and losing two others. She finished year as world No. 58 in singles and No. 7 in doubles, after spending the whole year inside the top 60 in singles and top 10 in doubles.

During the 2020 season, Siniaková continued to struggle with results in singles. Her first stand out result was when she defeated former world No. 1, Angelique Kerber, in the first round of the Premier 5 Italian Open, in straight sets. In the following round, she lost to Daria Kasatkina. After that, she reached the quarterfinals of the Internationaux de Strasbourg and then the third round of the French Open. In doubles, she won the title at the Shenzhen Open in the opening week. She followed this up with a strong performance at the Australian Open, where, alongside Krejčíková, she reached the semifinals. With this result, she completed the achievement of reaching the quarterfinals all four Grand Slam tournaments. Siniaková then reached the semifinals of the Premier 5 Qatar Ladies Open. Then, after six months absence of the WTA Tour due to COVID-19 outbreak, Siniaková started slow with the semifinal of the Prague Open, first round of Cincinnati Open, second round at the US Open, but then reached the quarterfinals of the Italian Open and semifinals of the French Open. The end of the year saw her reach the doubles final of the Linz Open, alongside Lucie Hradecká. Siniaková spent the whole year inside top 70 in singles, while in doubles inside the top 10. She finished season as the world No. 64 in singles, and No. 8 in doubles.

=== 2021: French Open doubles title and No. 1 ===
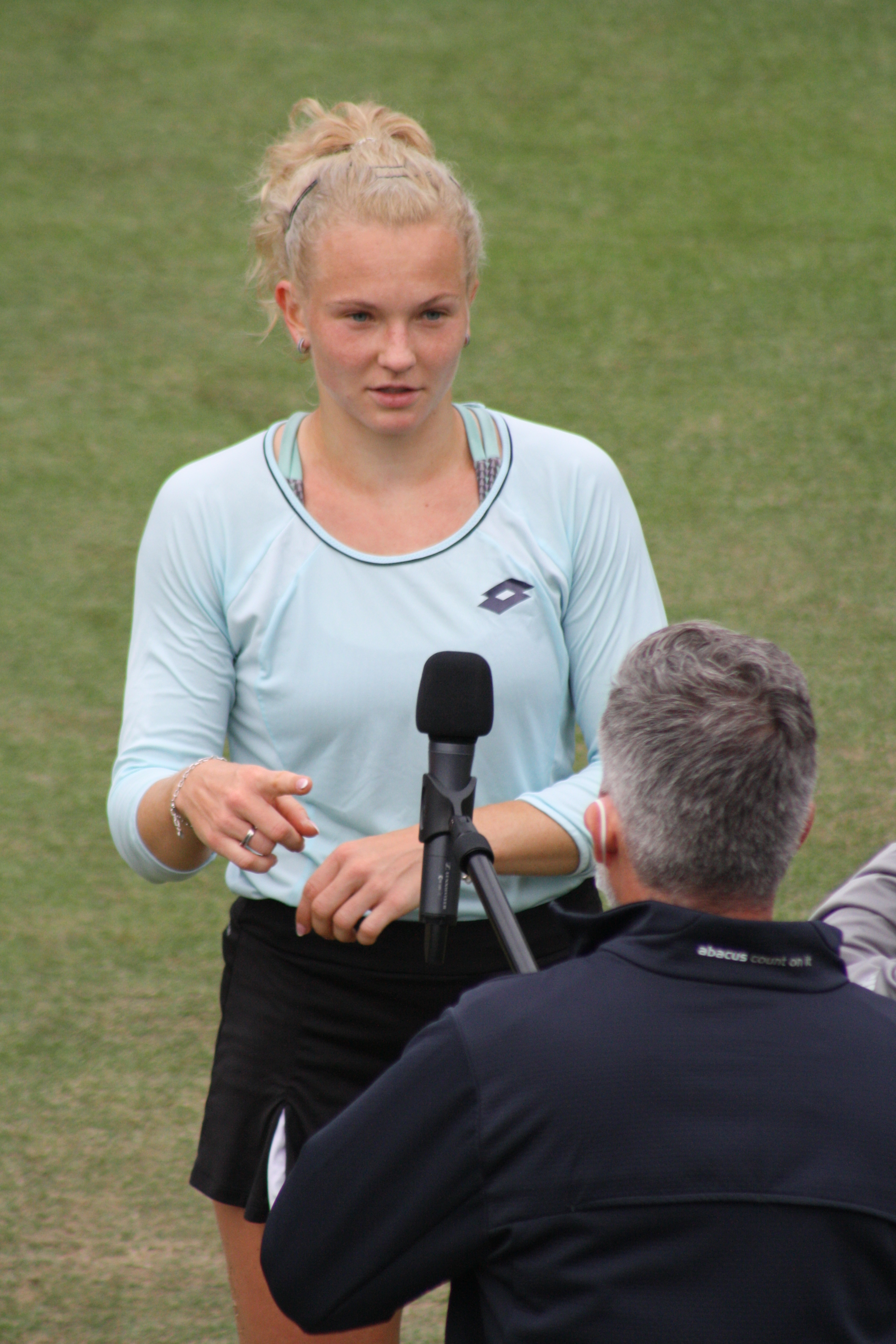
Siniaková at the 2021 Bad Homburg Open.

There was a positive start to 2021, when Siniaková and Krejčíková reached the doubles final at the Australian Open, before losing to Elise Mertens and Aryna Sabalenka.

At the French Open in doubles, Siniaková and Krejčíková defeated the Plíšková twins in an all Czech quarterfinals and Bernarda Pera & Magda Linette in the semifinals to reach their second French Open final. They then beat Bethanie Mattek-Sands and Iga Świątek in straight sets to claim their second title at Roland Garros, while partner Krejčíková won her maiden Grand Slam singles title at the same event. As a result, Krejčíková and Siniaková reclaimed the No. 1 and No. 2 spots in the doubles rankings, respectively.

At the delayed Tokyo Olympics, Siniaková and Krejčíková won gold in women's doubles, defeating the Swiss pair of Belinda Bencic and Viktorija Golubic in the final. They ended the season by winning the WTA Finals doubles title in Guadalajara, going through the tournament unbeaten. Consequently, Siniaková rose to the top of the rankings and ended the year as the world No. 1 doubles player.

In singles, Siniaková reached her first WTA Tour singles final in several years at the Bad Homburg Open which she lost to Angelique Kerber. On home soil, she reached the quarterfinals of the Prague Open in July, being beaten heavily by her doubles partner Krejčíková who would go in to take the title. In October, Siniaková defeated returning former No. 1, Kim Clijsters, at the Indian Wells Open. She ended the year ranked No. 49 in singles.

=== 2022: Career Golden Slam, again world No. 1 ===
Siniaková began the 2022 season by winning the doubles title at the Melbourne Summer Set 2 with Bernarda Pera.

As the top seed at the Australian Open, Siniaková reached the doubles final with Krejčíková, in which they defeated Anna Danilina and Beatriz Haddad Maia to claim their first Australian Open women's doubles title.

Siniaková's season in doubles was affected by an elbow injury to Krejčíková in Doha in February that meant they did not play together again until Wimbledon. Siniaková herself was affected by an abdominal injury that forced her to withdraw in matches in Miami and Madrid. However, she won the doubles title at the German Open with Storm Sanders in June. The Czech duo was forced to withdraw from the French Open as well, after Krejčíková tested positive for COVID-19.

At Wimbledon, she lost in the first round in singles to first-time qualifier Maja Chwalińska in straight sets. At the same tournament in doubles, she reached the final with Krejčíková and won the title for a second time at this major defeating top seeds Elise Mertens and Zhang Shuai, in straight sets.

After poor results in singles, Siniaková dropped down to play an ITF tournament in Poland in August, which she won beating Magda Linette.

At the US Open, she won the doubles title with Krejčíková completing the career Golden Slam. Siniaková followed up this success in doubles a week later with her third singles title at the Portorož Open in Slovenia, defeating 2022 Wimbledon champion Elena Rybakina in the final, in three sets. Siniaková then teamed up with Kristina Mladenovic to win the doubles title at the Jasmin Open.

She had another good win in singles to beat top-20 player Haddad Maia in the first round of the last WTA 1000 of the year at the Guadalajara Open and made the semifinals in doubles alongside Krejčíková. The pair then played the WTA Finals in Fort Worth, Texas. They went undefeated in the round robin stage but were defeated in the final by Veronika Kudermetova and Elise Mertens.

=== 2023: Doubles: Australian Open win. Singles: two titles ===
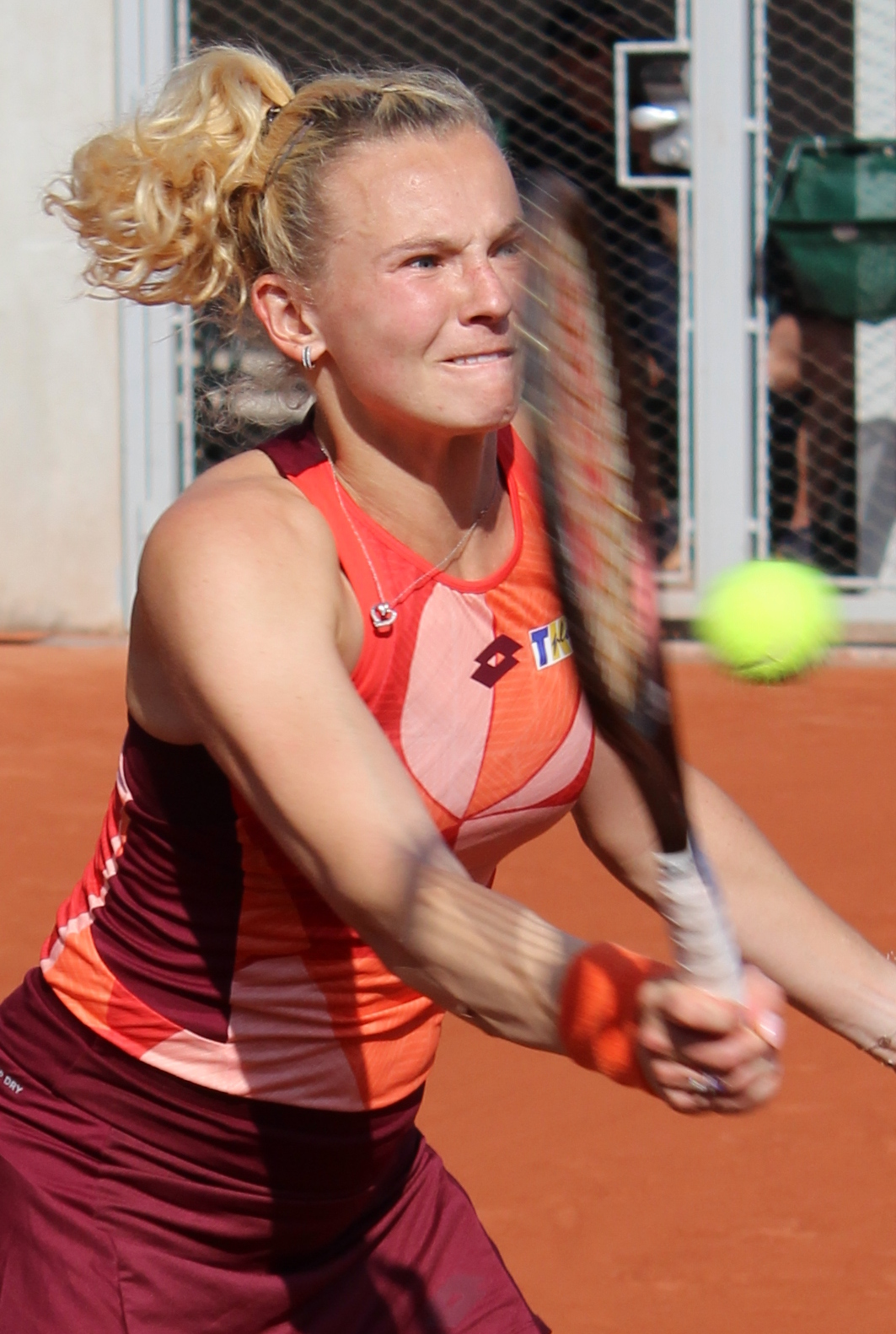
Siniaková at the 2023 French Open

Siniaková began season at the 2023 Adelaide International 1 where she failed to qualify in singles, but teamed up with Storm Hunter to reach the final in which they were defeated by Taylor Townsend and Asia Muhammed. At the Australian Open, she reunited with Krejčíková in the women's doubles, where they won their 24th consecutive major match, and their seventh doubles major title and for the first time, defended a major title. With this win, Siniaková retained the world No. 1 doubles ranking. She and Krejčíková won the Indian Wells Open.

She reached her first singles final of the season at the Bad Homburg Open and second at this tournament, defeating second seed Liudmila Samsonova and Emma Navarro in the same day. Finally, she won her fourth singles title by defeating Lucia Bronzetti in two sets.

Siniaková won her 23rd career doubles title alongside Krejčíková at the San Diego Open. She defeated compatriot Marie Bouzková to win her fifth WTA Tour singles title and second of the year at the Jiangxi Open.

In November, it was announced that Siniaková and Krejčíková would no longer play doubles together, a change initiated by Siniaková.

She ended the year ranked No. 45 in singles and No. 10 in doubles – her lowest year-end doubles ranking since 2017.

=== 2024: Two major doubles titles & No. 1, Olympic gold in mixed-doubles ===
Siniaková at the 2024 Prague Open.

At the Qatar Ladies Open, she defeated Donna Vekić and second seed Coco Gauff to reach the round of 16, where her run was ended by qualifier Danielle Collins.

In doubles, at the next WTA 1000 in Dubai, Siniaková won her fourth WTA 1000 title with new partner Storm Hunter. In Indian Wells, she reached the final with Hunter but they lost to top-seeded pair Hsieh/Mertens.

At the French Open, with new partner Coco Gauff, she lifted her third trophy at Roland Garros defeating 11th seeds Sara Errani and Jasmine Paolini in the final. At the same tournament in singles, she reached the second round with a win over lucky loser Dalma Galfi, before losing to wildcard entrant Chloe Paquet in a deciding set tie-break.

Ranked at a career-high of No. 30 in singles, Siniaková reached her first quarterfinal for the season as a qualifier at the Berlin Ladies Open defeating Emma Navarro and sixth seed Zheng Qinwen. She lost in the last eight to fourth seed Jessica Pegula in a three-set match played over two days due to rain interruptions.

The Czech reached her 11th major doubles final at Wimbledon and third at this major with Taylor Townsend. They won the title defeating the new world No. 1, Erin Routliffe and Gabriela Dabrowski, in straight sets with two tiebreaks.

Siniaková reunited with Krejčíková in the doubles at the Prague Open, winning their first title together on home soil by defeating wildcards Bethanie Mattek-Sands and Lucie Šafářová in the final as they warmed up for the 2024 Summer Olympics. At the Games in Paris, they lost their quarterfinal match to Mirra Andreeva and Diana Shnaider. Siniaková did achieve success in the mixed doubles, winning the gold medal with Tomáš Macháč.

Going into the Guangzhou Open in October as top seed, Siniaková reached the semifinals with wins over Petra Martić,Alycia Parks and Bernarda Pera. In the semifinal match against Olga Danilović, she retired in the third set. Partnering Zhang Shuai, she won the doubles at the same tournament, defeating Katarzyna Piter and Fanny Stollár in the final.

Siniaková clinched the year-end No. 1 doubles ranking on 5 November for the fourth time in her career. Partnering Taylor Townsend, she qualified for the WTA Finals and reached the semifinals after going unbeaten in the group stages. They defeated Chan Hao-ching and Veronika Kudermetova in the last four. Siniaková and Townsend lost to second seeds Gabriela Dabrowski and Erin Routliffe in the final.

=== 2025: Tenth major in doubles, first mixed title at Wimbledon ===
Siniaková at the 2025 Transylvania Open

Partnering Taylor Townsend, Siniaková claimed her 10th major doubles title by winning the Australian Open, defeating Hsieh Su-wei and Jeļena Ostapenko in the final.

In her next tournament, the Linz Open, she played alongside Zhang Shuai and reached the semifinals, where they lost in three sets to Luisa Stefani and Tímea Babos.

Back alongside Taylor Townsend, Siniaková won the doubles title at the Dubai Championships, defeating Hsieh and Ostapenko in the final in a repeat of the previous months' Australian Open championship match.

Siniaková won her first Grand Slam mixed doubles title at the 2025 Wimbledon Championships with Dutch Sem Verbeek.

Reunited with Barbora Krejčíková, she won the doubles title at the Korea Open in September, defeating Maya Joint and Caty McNally in the final.

The following month, Siniaková teamed with Storm Hunter to win the doubles title at the Wuhan Open, defeating Anna Danilina and Aleksandra Krunić in the final.

=== 2026: Two majors, record sixth year-end doubles world No. 1 ===
In January at the Adelaide International, Siniaková teamed up with Zhang Shuai to win her 33rd doubles title, defeating Lyudmyla Kichenok and Desirae Krawczyk in the final.

Reunited with regular partner, Taylor Townsend, she won back-to-back WTA 1000 doubles titles at the Indian Wells Open and Miami Open, becoming the sixth pairing to complete the so-called Sunshine Double. At the Madrid Open, Siniaková and Townsend defeated Mirra Andreeva and Diana Shnaider in straight sets in the final to win their third WTA 1000 doubles title in a row. They also won the French Open, overcoming Danilina and Krunić in the final.

In September at the US Open, she and Townsend completed a career Grand Slam as a pairing, defeating wildcard entrants Ashlyn Krueger and Robin Montgomery in the final. She became the ninth woman to complete a career Grand Slam twice — and the first tennis player to do so with different partners.

The following month, Siniaková also defeated Krueger in the final at the Japan Women's Open to win her sixth WTA Tour singles title and first since 2023. At the end of season WTA Finals, she combined with Townsend to win her second doubles title at the event, defeating Errani and Paolini in the final. Siniaková finished 2026 as year-end doubles No. 1 for a record sixth time.

== National representation ==
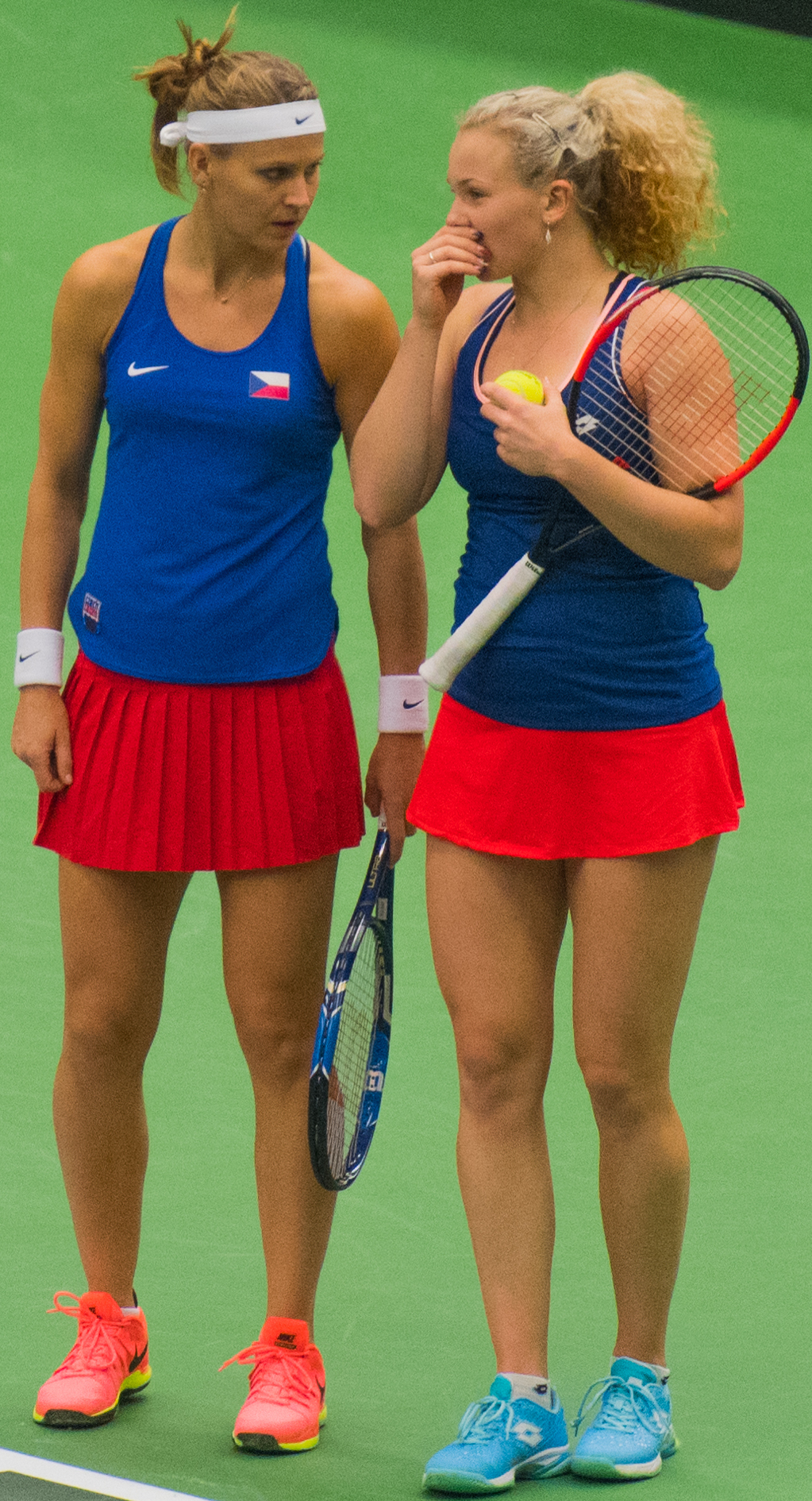
Siniaková (right) with Lucie Šafářová in a 2017 Fed Cup rubber against Spain

In February 2017, she was nominated to the Fed Cup team for the first time by the captain Petr Pála as she was the third best ranked woman Czech tennis player (considering Petra Kvitová's injury) after Karolína Plíšková and Barbora Strýcová and would benefit from the experience. She was again part of the Fed Cup the following year, playing in both the semi-finals and final. She won a singles and doubles rubber in the latter, thereby collecting the final points Czech Republic needed to win the event.

Siniaková along with Barbora Krejčíková won the gold medal in the women's doubles at the 2020 Summer Olympics.

Siniaková was also part of the Czech team at the 2020-21 Billie Jean King Cup finals in Prague where she played doubles alongside Lucie Hradecká. She was again part of the Czech team at the 2022 Billie Jean King Cup finals held in Glasgow, Scotland. In the group stage, she teamed up with Markéta Vondroušová to win a doubles tie against Poland and earned the winning point by beating Coco Gauff in singles.

During the 2023 Billie Jean King Cup finals, Siniaková anchored the Czech team's doubles lineup, notably securing a decisive group-stage victory against the United States before Czechia fell to eventual champions Canada in the semifinals. Although she was nominated to the squad for the 2024 Billie Jean King Cup finals, she did not feature on-court as the team's singles players secured their respective ties early. Partnering Tomáš Macháč she won second gold medal for Czechia in mixed doubles at 2024 Paris Olympics.

Due to scheduling conflicts, Siniaková opted out of participating with the Czech national team for the 2025 Billie Jean King Cup edition of the tournament.

Siniaková returned to the national team for the 2026 Billie Jean King Cup finals in Shenzhen, China, where Czechia entered the tournament as one of the pre-event favorites. Having recently secured the doubles title at the 2026 US Open, she joined a star-studded squad that included Linda Nosková, Karolína Muchová, and Marie Bouzková. Czechia went on to capture its 12th tournament title by defeating Ukraine 2–0 in the final on September 27, 2026. Because singles players Muchová and Nosková swept their matches in the knockout rounds—including the quarterfinals against Great Britain, the semifinals against Spain, and the final tie against Ukraine—the ties were decided early, meaning Siniaková's doubles services were not required on-court during the finals. It was her second title, she previously won in 2018, known as Fed Cup.

== Career statistics ==
=== Grand Slam tournament performance timelines ===
Key
W	F	SF	QF	#R	RR	Q#	P#	DNQ	A	Z#	PO	G	S	B	NMS	NTI	P	NH

(W) winner; (F) finalist; (SF) semifinalist; (QF) quarterfinalist; (#R) rounds 4, 3, 2, 1; (RR) round-robin stage; (Q#) qualification round; (P#) preliminary round; (DNQ) did not qualify; (A) absent; (Z#) Davis/Fed Cup Zonal Group (with number indication) or (PO) play-off; (G) gold, (S) silver or (B) bronze Olympic/Paralympic medal; (NMS) not a Masters tournament; (NTI) not a Tier I tournament; (P) postponed; (NH) not held; (SR) strike rate (events won / competed); (W–L) win–loss record.
To avoid confusion and double counting, these charts are updated at the conclusion of a tournament or when the player's participation has ended.

==== Singles ====
Current through the 2026 WTA Tour.

Tournament	2014	2015	2016	2017	2018	2019	2020	2021	2022	2023	2024	2025	2026	SR	W–L	Win %
Australian Open	1R	2R	1R	1R	2R	1R	1R	1R	1R	1R	2R	1R	2R	0 / 13	4–13	24%
French Open	Q2	1R	1R	1R	3R	4R	3R	3R	2R	1R	2R	1R	2R	0 / 12	12–12	50%
Wimbledon	Q1	1R	3R	1R	3R	2R	NH	3R	1R	2R	2R	2R	2R	0 / 10	11–11	50%
US Open	Q3	1R	2R	1R	3R	1R	1R	2R	2R	1R	1R	1R	2R	0 / 12	6–12	33%
Win–Loss	0–1	1–4	3–4	0–4	7–4	4–4	2–3	5–4	2–4	1–4	3–4	1–4	4–4	0 / 48	33–48	41%

==== Doubles ====
Current through the 2026 WTA Tour.

Tournament	2014	2015	2016	2017	2018	2019	2020	2021	2022	2023	2024	2025	2026	SR	W–L	Win%
Australian Open	A	1R	1R	1R	3R	QF	SF	F	W	W	SF	W	QF	3 / 12	38–9	81%
French Open	A	3R	SF	SF	W	1R	SF	W	A	1R	W	QF	W	4 / 11	41–7	85%
Wimbledon	A	2R	1R	3R	W	SF	NH	QF	W	A	W	SF	QF	3 / 10	35–7	83%
US Open	A	1R	QF	F	SF	1R	2R	1R	W	2R	SF	F	W	2 / 12	34–10	77%
Win–Loss	0–0	3–4	7–4	11–4	18–2	7–4	9–3	12–3	18–0	7–2	19–2	18–3	17–2	12 / 45	148–33	82%

=== Grand Slam tournament finals ===
==== Doubles: 15 (12 titles, 3 runner-ups) ====
Result	Year	Tournament	Surface	Partner	Opponents	Score
Loss	2017	US Open	Hard	(Czech Republic) Lucie Hradecká	(Chinese Taipei) Chan Yung-jan (Switzerland) Martina Hingis	3–6, 2–6
Win	2018	French Open	Clay	(Czech Republic) Barbora Krejčíková	(Japan) Eri Hozumi (Japan) Makoto Ninomiya	6–3, 6–3
Win	2018	Wimbledon	Grass	(Czech Republic) Barbora Krejčíková	(United States) Nicole Melichar (Czech Republic) Květa Peschke	6–4, 4–6, 6–0
Loss	2021	Australian Open	Hard	(Czech Republic) Barbora Krejčíková	(Belgium) Elise Mertens (Belarus) Aryna Sabalenka	2–6, 3–6
Win	2021	French Open (2)	Clay	(Czech Republic) Barbora Krejčíková	(United States) Bethanie Mattek-Sands (Poland) Iga Świątek	6–4, 6–2
Win	2022	Australian Open	Hard	(Czech Republic) Barbora Krejčíková	(Kazakhstan) Anna Danilina (Brazil) Beatriz Haddad Maia	6–7^{(3–7)}, 6–4, 6–4
Win	2022	Wimbledon (2)	Grass	(Czech Republic) Barbora Krejčíková	(Belgium) Elise Mertens (China) Zhang Shuai	6–2, 6–4
Win	2022	US Open	Hard	(Czech Republic) Barbora Krejčíková	(United States) Caty McNally (United States) Taylor Townsend	3–6, 7–5, 6–1
Win	2023	Australian Open (2)	Hard	(Czech Republic) Barbora Krejčíková	(Japan) Shuko Aoyama (Japan) Ena Shibahara	6–4, 6–3
Win	2024	French Open (3)	Clay	(United States) Coco Gauff	(Italy) Sara Errani (Italy) Jasmine Paolini	7–6^{(7–5)}, 6–3
Win	2024	Wimbledon (3)	Grass	(United States) Taylor Townsend	(Canada) Gabriela Dabrowski (New Zealand) Erin Routliffe	7–6^{(7–5)}, 7–6^{(7–1)}
Win	2025	Australian Open (3)	Hard	(United States) Taylor Townsend	(Chinese Taipei) Hsieh Su-wei (Latvia) Jeļena Ostapenko	6–2, 6–7^{(4–7)}, 6–3
Loss	2025	US Open	Hard	(United States) Taylor Townsend	(Canada) Gabriela Dabrowski (New Zealand) Erin Routliffe	4–6, 4–6
Win	2026	French Open (4)	Clay	(United States) Taylor Townsend	(Kazakhstan) Anna Danilina (Serbia) Aleksandra Krunić	6–2, 7–5
Win	2026	US Open (2)	Hard	(United States) Taylor Townsend	(United States) Ashlyn Krueger (United States) Robin Montgomery	5–7, 6–0, 6–2

==== Mixed doubles: 1 (title) ====
Result	Year	Tournament	Surface	Partner	Opponents	Score
Win	2025	Wimbledon	Grass	(Netherlands) Sem Verbeek	(Brazil) Luisa Stefani (United Kingdom) Joe Salisbury	7–6^{(7–3)}, 7–6^{(7–3)}

=== Year-end championships finals ===
==== Doubles: 5 (2 titles, 3 runner-ups) ====
Result	Year	Tournament	Surface	Partner	Opponents	Score
Loss	2018	WTA Finals, Singapore	Hard (i)	(Czech Republic) Barbora Krejčíková	(Hungary) Tímea Babos (France) Kristina Mladenovic	4–6, 5–7
Win	2021	WTA Finals, Mexico	Hard	(Czech Republic) Barbora Krejčíková	(Chinese Taipei) Hsieh Su-wei (Belgium) Elise Mertens	6–3, 6–4
Loss	2022	WTA Finals, United States	Hard (i)	(Czech Republic) Barbora Krejčíková	Veronika Kudermetova (Belgium) Elise Mertens	2–6, 6–4, [9–11]
Loss	2024	WTA Finals, Saudi Arabia	Hard (i)	(United States) Taylor Townsend	(New Zealand) Erin Routliffe (Canada) Gabriela Dabrowski	5–7, 3–6
Win	2026	WTA Finals, United States	Hard	(United States) Taylor Townsend	(Italy) Sara Errani (Italy) Jasmine Paolini	6–4, 6–3

=== Olympic medal matches ===
==== Doubles: 1 (gold) ====
Result	Year	Tournament	Surface	Partner	Opponents	Score
Gold	2021	Tokyo Olympics	Hard	(Czech Republic) Barbora Krejčíková	(Switzerland) Belinda Bencic (Switzerland) Viktorija Golubic	7–5, 6–1

==== Mixed doubles: 1 (gold) ====
Result	Year	Tournament	Surface	Partner	Opponents	Score
Gold	2024	Paris Olympics	Clay	(Czech Republic) Tomáš Macháč	(China) Wang Xinyu (China) Zhang Zhizhen	6–2, 5–7, [10–8]
