= 2026 WTA Finals – Doubles =

Doubles
- 2026 WTA Finals

Final
- Champions: (Czech Republic) Kateřina Siniaková (United States) Taylor Townsend
- Runners-up: (Italy) Sara Errani (Italy) Jasmine Paolini
- Score: 6–4, 6–3
- Date: 15 November 2026

Details
- Draw: 8 (round robin + elimination)
- Seeds: 8

Events
Singles	Doubles
- WTA Finals

Kateřina Siniaková and Taylor Townsend defeated Sara Errani and Jasmine Paolini in the final, 6–4, 6–3 to win the doubles tennis title at the 2026 WTA Finals. It was the second WTA Finals title for Siniaková (after previously winning in 2021 with Barbora Krejčíková), and the first for Townsend. Townsend was the first American to win the title since Liezel Huber and Lisa Raymond in 2011. The final was a rematch of the teams' encounter in the round-robin stage, won by Errani and Paolini. Errani was attempting to complete the Career Super Slam in women's doubles.

Veronika Kudermetova and Elise Mertens were the reigning champions, but Kudermetova did not qualify this year. Mertens partnered with Zhang Shuai, but they were eliminated in the round-robin stage.

Guo Hanyu and Cristina Bucșa made their debuts in the doubles competition.

== Seeds ==
1. (Canada) Gabriela Dabrowski / (Brazil) Luisa Stefani (semifinals)
2. (Czech Republic) Kateřina Siniaková / (United States) Taylor Townsend (champions)
3. (China) Guo Hanyu / (France) Kristina Mladenovic (semifinals)
4. (Spain) Cristina Bucșa / (United States) Nicole Melichar-Martinez (round robin)
5. (Chinese Taipei) Hsieh Su-wei / (Latvia) Jeļena Ostapenko (round robin)
6. (Australia) Ellen Perez / (Netherlands) Demi Schuurs (round robin)
7. (Belgium) Elise Mertens / (China) Zhang Shuai (round robin)
8. (Italy) Sara Errani / (Italy) Jasmine Paolini (final)

== Alternates ==
1. (Slovakia) Tereza Mihalíková / (United Kingdom) Olivia Nicholls (did not play)
2. (New Zealand) Erin Routliffe / (Indonesia) Aldila Sutjiadi (did not play)

== Draw ==
Key

- Q = Qualifier
- WC = Wild card
- LL = Lucky loser
- Alt = Alternate
- ITF = ITF entry
- PR = Protected ranking
- SR = Special ranking
- SE = Special exempt
- JE = Junior exempt
- JR = Junior Accelerator Programme entrant
- CO = College Accelerator Programme entrant
- NG = Next Gen Accelerator Program entrant
- w/o = Walkover
- r = Retired
- d = Defaulted

=== Finals ===
Semifinals
1	(Canada) Gabriela Dabrowski (Brazil) Luisa Stefani	6^{4}	3
2	(Czech Republic) Kateřina Siniaková (United States) Taylor Townsend	7^{7}	6
3	(China) Guo Hanyu (France) Kristina Mladenovic	3	4
8	(Italy) Sara Errani (Italy) Jasmine Paolini	6	6

Final
2	(Czech Republic) Kateřina Siniaková (United States) Taylor Townsend	6	6
8	(Italy) Sara Errani (Italy) Jasmine Paolini	4	3

=== Group 1 ===
		(Canada) Dabrowski (Brazil) Stefani	(China) Guo (France) Mladenovic	(Chinese Taipei) Hsieh (Latvia) Ostapenko	(Belgium) Mertens (China) Zhang	RR; W–L	Set; W–L	Game; W–L	Standings
1	(Canada) Gabriela Dabrowski (Brazil) Luisa Stefani		7–6^{(7–5)}, 4–6, [10–5]	2–6, 7–6^{(7–2)}, [10–3]	6–3, 7–6^{(7–5)}	3–0	6–2 (75%)	35–33 (51%)	1
3	(China) Guo Hanyu (France) Kristina Mladenovic	6–7^{(5–7)}, 6–4, [5–10]		3–6, 6–1, [12–10]	6–7^{(4–7)}, 6–3, [12–10]	2–1	5–4 (56%)	35–29 (55%)	2
5	(Chinese Taipei) Hsieh Su-wei (Latvia) Jeļena Ostapenko	6–2, 6–7^{(2–7)}, [3–10]	6–3, 1–6, [10–12]		7–5, 6–3	1–2	4–4 (50%)	32–28 (53%)	3
7	(Belgium) Elise Mertens (China) Zhang Shuai	3–6, 6–7^{(5–7)}	7–6^{(7–4)}, 3–6, [10–12]	5–7, 3–6		0–3	1–6 (14%)	27–39 (41%)	4

=== Group 2 ===
		(Czech Republic) Siniaková (United States) Townsend	(Spain) Bucșa (United States) Melichar-Martinez	(Australia) Perez (Netherlands) Schuurs	(Italy) Errani (Italy) Paolini	RR; W–L	Set; W–L	Game; W–L	Standings
2	(Czech Republic) Kateřina Siniaková (United States) Taylor Townsend		6–2, 4–2 ret.	7–6^{(7–2)}, 6–3	6–4, 1–6, [8–10]	2–1	5–2 (71%)	30–24 (56%)	2
4	(Spain) Cristina Bucșa (United States) Nicole Melichar-Martinez	2–6, 2–4 ret.		6–0, 6–4	6–3, 2–6, [7–10]	1–2	3–4 (43%)	24–24 (50%)	3
6	(Australia) Ellen Perez (Netherlands) Demi Schuurs	6–7^{(2–7)}, 3–6	0–6, 4–6		3–6, 4–6	0–3	0–6 (0%)	20–37 (35%)	4
8	(Italy) Sara Errani (Italy) Jasmine Paolini	4–6, 6–1, [10–8]	3–6, 6–2, [10–7]	6–3, 6–4		3–0	6–2 (75%)	33–22 (60%)	1

Standings are determined by: 1. number of wins; 2. number of matches; 3. in two-team ties, head-to-head records; 4. in three-team ties, (a) percentage of sets won (head-to-head records if two teams remain tied), then (b) percentage of games won (head-to-head records if two teams remain tied).
