= 2019 WTA Shenzhen Open =

- Date: 31 December 2018 – 5 January 2019
- Edition: 7th
- Category: WTA International
- Draw: 32S / 16D
- Prize money: $750,000
- Surface: Hard
- Location: Shenzhen, China
- Venue: Shenzhen Longgang Sports Center

Champions

Singles
- (Belarus) Aryna Sabalenka

Doubles
- (China) Peng Shuai / (China) Yang Zhaoxuan
← 2018 ·	WTA Shenzhen Open	· 2020 →

The 2019 Shenzhen Open was a tennis tournament played on outdoor hard courts. It was the seventh edition of the Shenzhen Open, and part of the WTA International tournaments of the 2019 WTA Tour. It took place at the Shenzhen Longgang Sports Center in Shenzhen, China, from 31 December 2018 until 5 January 2019. First-seeded Aryna Sabalenka won the singles title.

== Finals ==
=== Singles ===
- (Belarus) Aryna Sabalenka defeated (United States) Alison Riske, 4–6, 7–6^{(7–2)}, 6–3

=== Doubles ===
- (China) Peng Shuai / (China) Yang Zhaoxuan defeated (China) Duan Yingying / (Czech Republic) Renata Voráčová, 6–4, 6–3

== Points and prize money ==
=== Point distribution ===
Event	W	F	SF	QF	Round of 16	Round of 32	Q	Q2	Q1
Singles	280	180	110	60	30	1	18	12	1
Doubles	280	180	110	60	1	—	—	—	—

=== Prize money ===
Event	W	F	SF	QF	Round of 16	Round of 32^{1}	Q2	Q1
Singles	$163,260	$81,251	$43,663	$13,121	$7,238	$4,698	$2,720	$1,588
Doubles *	$26,031	$13,544	$7,271	$3,852	$2,031	—	—	—

_{^{1} Qualifiers prize money is also the Round of 32 prize money}
_{* per team}

== Singles main draw entrants ==
=== Seeds ===
Country	Player	Rank^{1}	Seed
BLR	Aryna Sabalenka	13	1
FRA	Caroline Garcia	19	2
CHN	Wang Qiang	20	3
LAT	Jeļena Ostapenko	22	4
RUS	Maria Sharapova	29	5
CHN	Zheng Saisai	39	6
CHN	Zhang Shuai	40	7
RUS	Anastasia Pavlyuchenkova	42	8

- ^{1} Rankings as of December 24, 2018.

=== Other entrants ===
The following players received wildcards into the singles main draw:

- (China) Peng Shuai
- (China) Wang Xinyu
- (Russia) Vera Zvonareva

The following player received entry into the singles main draw using a protected ranking:

- (Switzerland) Timea Bacsinszky

The following players received entry from the qualifying draw:

- (Serbia) Ivana Jorović
- (Russia) Veronika Kudermetova
- (Romania) Monica Niculescu
- (China) Xun Fangying

=== Retirements ===
- (China) Peng Shuai (right thigh injury)
- (Russia) Maria Sharapova (left thigh injury)
- (China) Wang Xinyu (cramping)
- (Russia) Vera Zvonareva (left hip injury)

== Doubles main draw entrants ==
=== Seeds ===
Country	Player	Country	Player	Rank^{1}	Seed
JPN	Shuko Aoyama	BLR	Lidziya Marozava	83	1
CHN	Peng Shuai	CHN	Yang Zhaoxuan	88	2
SLO	Dalila Jakupović	RUS	Irina Khromacheva	100	3
CHN	Wang Yafan	CHN	Zhang Shuai	125	4

- ^{1} Rankings as of December 24, 2018

=== Other entrants ===
The following pairs received wildcards into the doubles main draw:

- (China) Chen Jiahui / (China) Wang Danni
- (China) Wang Xinyu / (China) Xun Fangying

The following pairs received entry as alternates:

- (Russia) Anastasia Pavlyuchenkova / (Russia) Natalia Vikhlyantseva

=== Withdrawals ===
Before the tournament

- (China) Wang Yafan (left adductor strain)
- (China) Saisai Zheng (viral illness)

During the tournament

- (Russia) Natalia Vikhlyantseva (right forearm injury)
