= 2016 WTA Shenzhen Open =

- Date: 2–9 January 2016
- Edition: 4th
- Category: WTA International
- Draw: 32S / 16D
- Prize money: $500,000
- Surface: Hard
- Location: Shenzhen, China
- Venue: Shenzhen Longgang Sports Center

Champions

Singles
- (Poland) Agnieszka Radwańska

Doubles
- (United States) Vania King / (Romania) Monica Niculescu
← 2015 ·	WTA Shenzhen Open	· 2017 →

The 2016 Shenzhen Open (known as 2016 Shenzhen Gemdale Open for sponsorship reason) was a women's tennis tournament played on outdoor hard courts. It was the fourth edition of the Shenzhen Open, and part of the WTA International tournaments of the 2016 WTA Tour. It took place at the Shenzhen Longgang Sports Center in Shenzhen, China, from 2 January to 9 January 2016. First-seeded Agnieszka Radwańska won the singles title.

== Finals ==
=== Singles ===
- (Poland) Agnieszka Radwańska defeated (United States) Alison Riske, 6–3, 6–2

=== Doubles ===
- (United States) Vania King / (Romania) Monica Niculescu defeated (China) Xu Yifan / (China) Zheng Saisai, 6–1, 6–4

== Points and prize money ==
=== Point distribution ===
Event	W	F	SF	QF	Round of 16	Round of 32	Q	Q2	Q1
Singles	280	180	110	60	30	1	18	12	1
Doubles	280	180	110	60	1	—	—	—	—

=== Prize money ===
Event	W	F	SF	QF	Round of 16	Round of 32^{1}	Q2	Q1
Singles	$111,163	$55,323	$29,730	$8,934	$4,928	$3,199	$1,852	$1,081
Doubles *	$17,724	$9,222	$4,951	$2,623	$1,383	—	—	—

_{^{1} Qualifiers prize money is also the Round of 32 prize money}
_{* per team}

== Singles main draw entrants ==
=== Seeds ===
Country	Player	Rank^{1}	Seed
POL	Agnieszka Radwańska	5	1
CZE	Petra Kvitová	6	2
ROU	Irina-Camelia Begu	31	3
ROU	Monica Niculescu	39	4
GBR	Johanna Konta	48	5
CAN	Eugenie Bouchard	49	6
KAZ	Zarina Diyas	52	7
GER	Annika Beck	58	8

- ^{1} Rankings as of December 28, 2015.

=== Other entrants ===
The following players received wildcards into the singles main draw:

- (China) Duan Yingying
- (Russia) Irina Khromacheva
- (China) Zhang Shuai

The following players received entry from the qualifying draw:

- (United States) Nicole Gibbs
- (Kazakhstan) Yaroslava Shvedova
- (Czech Republic) Tereza Smitková
- (China) Zhang Kailin

The following player received entry using a protected ranking:

- (United States) Vania King

The following player received entry as lucky loser:

- (Switzerland) Stefanie Vögele

=== Withdrawals ===
Before the tournament

- (Belarus) Olga Govortsova → replaced by (Czech Republic) Kateřina Siniaková
- (Poland) Magda Linette (gastrointestinal illness) → replaced by (Switzerland) Stefanie Vögele
- (Poland) Urszula Radwańska → replaced by (Croatia) Donna Vekić

=== Retirements ===
- (Romania) Irina-Camelia Begu (right knee injury)
- (Czech Republic) Petra Kvitová (gastrointestinal illness)

== Doubles main draw entrants ==
=== Seeds ===
Country	Player	Country	Player	Rank^{1}	Seed
CHN	Xu Yifan	CHN	Zheng Saisai	88	1
TPE	Chuang Chia-jung	GEO	Oksana Kalashnikova	113	2
RUS	Vera Dushevina	CZE	Kateřina Siniaková	147	3
TUR	Çağla Büyükakçay	SRB	Aleksandra Krunić	210	4

- ^{1} Rankings as of December 28, 2015

=== Other entrants ===
The following pair received wildcards into the doubles main draw:

- (China) Li Yixuan / (China) Sheng Yuqi

=== Withdrawals ===
Before the tournament

- (Poland) Magda Linette (gastrointestinal illness)
