= 2019 WTA Shenzhen Open – Doubles =

Doubles
- 2019 WTA Shenzhen Open

Final
- Champions: (China) Peng Shuai (China) Yang Zhaoxuan
- Runners-up: (China) Duan Yingying (Czech Republic) Renata Voráčová
- Score: 6–4, 6–3

Details
- Draw: 16
- Seeds: 4

Events
Singles	Doubles
← 2018 ·	WTA Shenzhen Open	· 2020 →

Irina-Camelia Begu and Simona Halep were the defending champions, but Halep chose not to participate. Begu was scheduled to play alongside Zheng Saisai, but the latter withdrew due to a viral illness.

Peng Shuai and Yang Zhaoxuan won the title, defeating Duan Yingying and Renata Voráčová in the final, 6–4, 6–3.

== Seeds ==
1. (Japan) Shuko Aoyama / (Belarus) Lidziya Marozava (quarterfinals)
2. (China) Peng Shuai / (China) Yang Zhaoxuan (champions)
3. (Slovenia) Dalila Jakupović / (Russia) Irina Khromacheva (quarterfinals)
4. (China) Wang Yafan / (China) Zhang Shuai (withdrew)

== Draw ==
=== Key ===
- Q = Qualifier
- WC = Wild card
- LL = Lucky loser
- Alt = Alternate
- SE = Special exempt
- PR = Protected ranking
- ITF = ITF entry
- JE = Junior exempt
- w/o = Walkover
- r = Retired
- d = Defaulted
- SR = Special ranking

=== Draw ===
First round
1	(Japan) S Aoyama (Belarus) L Marozava	6	6
WC	(China) J Chen (China) D Wang	2	4
(Japan) N Hibino (Ukraine) A Kalinina	6	7
(Germany) T Maria (France) P Parmentier	1	5
3	(Slovenia) D Jakupović (Russia) I Khromacheva	6	2	[10]
(China) X Jiang (China) Q Tang	4	6	[4]
(China) Y Duan (Czech Republic) R Voráčová	6	7^{10}
(Romania) S Cîrstea (Latvia) J Ostapenko	4	6^{8}
(Switzerland) T Bacsinszky (Russia) V Zvonareva	2	7	[13]
WC	(China) Xin Wang (China) F Xun	6	5	[11]
Alt	(Russia) A Pavlyuchenkova (Russia) N Vikhlyantseva	w/o
4	(China) Y Wang (China) S Zhang
(Montenegro) D Kovinić (Russia) Y Sizikova	3	1
(Romania) I Bara (Georgia (country)) O Kalashnikova	6	6
(Spain) G García Pérez (Russia) V Kudermetova	5	4
2	(China) S Peng (China) Z Yang	7	6

Quarterfinals
1	(Japan) S Aoyama (Belarus) L Marozava	2	7^{7}	[4]
(Japan) N Hibino (Ukraine) A Kalinina	6	6^{3}	[10]
3	(Slovenia) D Jakupović (Russia) I Khromacheva	4	2
(China) Y Duan (Czech Republic) R Voráčová	6	6
(Switzerland) T Bacsinszky (Russia) V Zvonareva	w/o
Alt	(Russia) A Pavlyuchenkova (Russia) N Vikhlyantseva
(Romania) I Bara (Georgia (country)) O Kalashnikova	4	3
2	(China) S Peng (China) Z Yang	6	6

Semifinals
(Japan) N Hibino (Ukraine) A Kalinina	6	1	[3]
(China) Y Duan (Czech Republic) R Voráčová	2	6	[10]
(Switzerland) T Bacsinszky (Russia) V Zvonareva	4	5
2	(China) S Peng (China) Z Yang	6	7

Final
(China) Y Duan (Czech Republic) R Voráčová	4	3
2	(China) S Peng (China) Z Yang	6	6
