= 2018 WTA Shenzhen Open =

- Date: 1–7 January 2018
- Edition: 6th
- Category: WTA International
- Draw: 32S / 16D
- Prize money: $750,000
- Surface: Hard
- Location: Shenzhen, China
- Venue: Shenzhen Longgang Sports Center

Champions

Singles
- (Romania) Simona Halep

Doubles
- (Romania) Irina-Camelia Begu / (Romania) Simona Halep
← 2017 ·	WTA Shenzhen Open	· 2019 →

The 2018 Shenzhen Open (known as 2018 Shenzhen Gemdale Open for sponsorship reason) was a women's tennis tournament played on outdoor hard courts. It was the sixth edition of the Shenzhen Open, and part of the WTA International tournaments of the 2018 WTA Tour. It took place at the Shenzhen Longgang Sports Center in Shenzhen, China, from 1 January until 7 January 2018. First-seeded Simona Halep won the singles title.

== Finals ==
=== Singles ===
- (Romania) Simona Halep defeated (Czech Republic) Kateřina Siniaková, 6–1, 2–6, 6–0

=== Doubles ===
- (Romania) Irina-Camelia Begu / (Romania) Simona Halep defeated (Czech Republic) Barbora Krejčíková / (Czech Republic) Kateřina Siniaková, 1–6, 6–1, [10–8]

== Points and prize money ==
=== Point distribution ===
Event	W	F	SF	QF	Round of 16	Round of 32	Q	Q2	Q1
Singles	280	180	110	60	30	1	18	12	1
Doubles	280	180	110	60	1	—	—	—	—

=== Prize money ===
Event	W	F	SF	QF	Round of 16	Round of 32^{1}	Q2	Q1
Singles	$163,260	$81,251	$43,663	$13,121	$7,238	$4,698	$2,720	$1,588
Doubles *	$26,031	$13,544	$7,271	$3,852	$2,031	—	—	—

_{^{1} Qualifiers prize money is also the Round of 32 prize money}
_{* per team}

== Singles main draw entrants ==
=== Seeds ===
Country	Player	Rank^{1}	Seed
ROU	Simona Halep	1	1
LAT	Jeļena Ostapenko	7	2
CHN	Zhang Shuai	35	3
ROU	Irina-Camelia Begu	43	4
CHN	Wang Qiang	45	5
CZE	Kateřina Siniaková	47	6
GRE	Maria Sakkari	51	7
HUN	Tímea Babos	55	8

- ^{1} Rankings as of December 25, 2017.

=== Other entrants ===
The following players received wildcards into the singles main draw:

- (China) Liu Fangzhou
- (China) Wang Xiyu
- (China) Wang Yafan

The following players received entry from the qualifying draw:

- (Montenegro) Danka Kovinić
- (Russia) Anna Blinkova
- (Switzerland) Stefanie Vögele
- (Italy) Jasmine Paolini

=== Withdrawals ===
Before the tournament

- (Ukraine) Kateryna Kozlova → replaced by (United States) Nicole Gibbs
- (Spain) Sara Sorribes Tormo → replaced by (Slovakia) Jana Čepelová

== Doubles main draw entrants ==
=== Seeds ===
Country	Player	Country	Player	Rank^{1}	Seed
CZE	Barbora Krejčíková	CZE	Kateřina Siniaková	67	1
ROU	Raluca Olaru	UKR	Olga Savchuk	69	2
CZE	Kristýna Plíšková	CZE	Renata Voráčová	106	3
RUS	Natela Dzalamidze	SUI	Xenia Knoll	129	4

- ^{1} Rankings as of December 25, 2017.

=== Other entrants ===
The following pairs received wildcards into the doubles main draw:

- (China) Guo Hanyu / (China) Wang Xinyu
- (China) Kang Jiaqi / (China) Zhang Shuai
