= 2015 WTA Shenzhen Open – Doubles =

Doubles
- 2015 WTA Shenzhen Open

Final
- Champions: (Ukraine) Lyudmyla Kichenok (Ukraine) Nadiia Kichenok
- Runners-up: (China) Liang Chen (China) Wang Yafan
- Score: 6–4, 7–6^{(8–6)}

Details
- Draw: 16
- Seeds: 4

Events
Singles	Doubles
← 2014 ·	WTA Shenzhen Open	· 2016 →

Monica Niculescu and Klára Koukalová were the defending champions, but Koukalová chose not to participate. Niculescu played alongside Zarina Diyas, but they lost in the first round to Lyudmyla Kichenok and Nadiia Kichenok.
The Kichenok sisters went on to win the title, defeating Liang Chen and Wang Yafan in the final, 6–4, 7–6^{(8–6)}.

== Seeds ==
1. (China) Peng Shuai / (China) Xu Yifan (first round)
2. (Spain) Lara Arruabarrena / (Romania) Irina-Camelia Begu (first round)
3. (Spain) Anabel Medina Garrigues / (Spain) María Teresa Torró Flor (first round)
4. (Chinese Taipei) Chan Chin-wei / (Georgia (country)) Oksana Kalashnikova (quarterfinals)

== Draw ==
=== Key ===
- Q = Qualifier
- WC = Wild card
- LL = Lucky loser
- Alt = Alternate
- SE = Special exempt
- PR = Protected ranking
- ITF = ITF entry
- JE = Junior exempt
- w/o = Walkover
- r = Retired
- d = Defaulted
- SR = Special ranking

=== Draw ===
First round
1	(China) S Peng (China) Y Xu	6	2	[12]
(China) C Liang (China) Y Wang	3	6	[14]
(Germany) A Beck (Israel) S Pe'er	1	4
(Poland) M Linette (China) S Zheng	6	6
3	(Spain) A Medina Garrigues (Spain) MT Torró Flor	2	3
(Turkey) C Büyükakçay (Italy) K Knapp	6	6
(Belarus) O Govortsova (Austria) P Mayr-Achleitner	0	3
(China) Z Yang (China) Q Ye	6	6
(Serbia) A Krunić (Czech Republic) K Siniaková	3	1
(Switzerland) T Bacsinszky (Russia) V Zvonareva	6	6
(Japan) R Fujiwara (Chinese Taipei) S-y Hsieh	1	2
4	(Chinese Taipei) C-w Chan (Georgia (country)) O Kalashnikova	6	6
(Kazakhstan) Z Diyas (Romania) M Niculescu	6	3	[5]
(Ukraine) L Kichenok (Ukraine) N Kichenok	4	6	[10]
(Thailand) L Kumkhum (China) L Zhu	7	6
2	(Spain) L Arruabarrena (Romania) I-C Begu	5	1

Quarterfinals
(China) C Liang (China) Y Wang	6	6
(Poland) M Linette (China) S Zheng	1	1
(Turkey) C Büyükakçay (Italy) K Knapp	5	6	[10]
(China) Z Yang (China) Q Ye	7	3	[7]
(Switzerland) T Bacsinszky (Russia) V Zvonareva	6	3	[10]
4	(Chinese Taipei) C-w Chan (Georgia (country)) O Kalashnikova	2	6	[6]
(Ukraine) L Kichenok (Ukraine) N Kichenok	6	6
(Thailand) L Kumkhum (China) L Zhu	4	4

Semifinals
(China) C Liang (China) Y Wang	6	6
(Turkey) C Büyükakçay (Italy) K Knapp	3	2
(Switzerland) T Bacsinszky (Russia) V Zvonareva
(Ukraine) L Kichenok (Ukraine) N Kichenok	w/o

Final
(China) C Liang (China) Y Wang	4	6^{6}
(Ukraine) L Kichenok (Ukraine) N Kichenok	6	7^{8}
