= 2017 WTA Shenzhen Open =

- Date: 1–7 January 2017
- Edition: 5th
- Category: WTA International
- Draw: 32S / 16D
- Prize money: $750,000
- Surface: Hard
- Location: Shenzhen, China
- Venue: Shenzhen Longgang Sports Center

Champions

Singles
- (Czech Republic) Kateřina Siniaková

Doubles
- (Czech Republic) Andrea Hlaváčková / (China) Peng Shuai
| ← 2016 · | WTA Shenzhen Open | · 2018 → |

The 2017 Shenzhen Open (known as 2017 Shenzhen Gemdale Open for sponsorship reason) was a women's tennis tournament played on outdoor hard courts. It was the fifth edition of the Shenzhen Open, and part of the WTA International tournaments of the 2017 WTA Tour. It took place at the Shenzhen Longgang Sports Center in Shenzhen, China, from 1 January to 7 January 2017. Unseeded Kateřina Siniaková won the singles title.

== Finals ==
=== Singles ===
- (Czech Republic) Kateřina Siniaková defeated (United States) Alison Riske, 6–3, 6–4

=== Doubles ===
- (Czech Republic) Andrea Hlaváčková / (China) Peng Shuai defeated (Romania) Raluca Olaru / (Ukraine) Olga Savchuk, 6–1, 7–5

== Points and prize money ==
=== Point distribution ===
| Event | W | F | SF | QF | Round of 16 | Round of 32 | Q | Q2 | Q1 |
| Singles | 280 | 180 | 110 | 60 | 30 | 1 | 18 | 12 | 1 |
| Doubles | 280 | 180 | 110 | 60 | 1 | — | — | — | — |

=== Prize money ===
| Event | W | F | SF | QF | Round of 16 | Round of 32^{1} | Q2 | Q1 |
| Singles | $163,260 | $81,251 | $43,663 | $13,121 | $7,238 | $4,698 | $2,720 | $1,588 |
| Doubles * | $26,031 | $13,544 | $7,271 | $3,852 | $2,031 | — | — | — |

_{^{1} Qualifiers prize money is also the Round of 32 prize money}
_{* per team}

== Singles main draw entrants ==
=== Seeds ===
| Country | Player | Rank^{1} | Seed |
|---|---|---|---|
| POL | Agnieszka Radwańska | 3 | 1 |
| ROU | Simona Halep | 4 | 2 |
| GBR | Johanna Konta | 10 | 3 |
| SUI | Timea Bacsinszky | 15 | 4 |
| HUN | Tímea Babos | 28 | 5 |
| LAT | Anastasija Sevastova | 34 | 6 |
| ROU | Monica Niculescu | 38 | 7 |
| USA | Alison Riske | 39 | 8 |

- ^{1} Rankings as of December 26, 2016.

=== Other entrants ===
The following players received wildcards into the singles main draw:

- (China) Duan Yingying
- (China) Zhang Kailin
- (China) Zhu Lin

The following players received entry using a protected ranking:

- (Kazakhstan) Galina Voskoboeva

The following players received entry from the qualifying draw:

- (Chinese Taipei) Chang Kai-chen
- (Tunisia) Ons Jabeur
- (Serbia) Nina Stojanović
- (Switzerland) Stefanie Vögele

The following players received entry as a Lucky loser:

- (Romania) Ana Bogdan
- (China) Liu Fangzhou

=== Withdrawals ===
Before the tournament

- (Germany) Anna-Lena Friedsam → replaced by (Greece) Maria Sakkari
- (Kazakhstan) Yaroslava Shvedova → replaced by (China) Liu Fangzhou
- (Switzerland) Timea Bacsinszky → replaced by (Romania) Ana Bogdan

== Doubles main draw entrants ==
=== Seeds ===
| Country | Player | Country | Player | Rank^{1} | Seed |
|---|---|---|---|---|---|
| USA | Raquel Atawo | CHN | Xu Yifan | 41 | 1 |
| CZE | Andrea Hlaváčková | CHN | Peng Shuai | 52 | 2 |
| ROU | Raluca Olaru | UKR | Olga Savchuk | 137 | 3 |
| ROU | Simona Halep | ROU | Monica Niculescu | 143 | 4 |

- ^{1} Rankings as of December 26, 2016.

=== Other entrants ===
The following pairs received wildcards into the doubles main draw:

- (China) Ma Shuyue / (China) Zhang Kailin
- (China) Duan Yingying / (China) Wang Qiang
