= 2014 WTA Shenzhen Open =

Women tennis tournament

- Date: 29 December 2013 – 5 January 2014
- Edition: 2nd
- Draw: 32S / 16D
- Prize money: $500,000
- Surface: Hard
- Location: Shenzhen, China
- Venue: Shenzhen Longgang Sports Center

Champions

Singles
- (China) Li Na

Doubles
- (Romania) Monica Niculescu / (Czech Republic) Klára Zakopalová
- WTA Shenzhen Open

The 2014 Shenzhen Open (known as 2014 Shenzhen Gemdale Open for sponsorship reason) was a tennis tournament played on outdoor hard courts. It was the second edition of the Shenzhen Open, and was part of the WTA International tournaments of the 2014 WTA Tour. It took place at the Shenzhen Longgang Sports Center in Shenzhen, China, from 29 December 2013 to 5 January 2014. First-seeded Li Na won the singles title.

== Finals ==
=== Singles ===
- (China) Li Na defeated (China) Peng Shuai, 6–4, 7–5

=== Doubles ===
- (Romania) Monica Niculescu / (Czech Republic) Klára Zakopalová defeated (Ukraine) Lyudmyla Kichenok / (Ukraine) Nadiia Kichenok, 6–3, 6–4

== Points and prize money ==
=== Point distribution ===
Event	W	F	SF	QF	Round of 16	Round of 32	Q	Q2	Q1
Singles	280	180	110	60	30	1	18	12	1
Doubles	280	180	110	60	1	—	—	—	—

=== Prize money ===
Event	W	F	SF	QF	Round of 16	Round of 32^{1}	Q2	Q1
Singles	$111,163	$55,323	$29,730	$8,934	$4,928	$3,199	$1,852	$1,081
Doubles *	$17,724	$9,222	$4,951	$2,623	$1,383	—	—	—

_{^{1} Qualifiers prize money is also the Round of 32 prize money}
_{* per team}

== Singles main draw entrants ==
=== Seeds ===
Country	Player	Rank^{1}	Seed
CHN	Li Na	3	1
ITA	Sara Errani	7	2
CZE	Klára Zakopalová	35	3
SRB	Bojana Jovanovski	36	4
CHN	Peng Shuai	42	5
CHN	Zhang Shuai	52	6
CHN	Zheng Jie	53	7
GER	Annika Beck	58	8

- ^{1} Rankings as of November 18, 2013.

=== Other entrants ===
The following players received wildcards into the singles main draw:

- (China) Liu Fangzhou
- (China) Zheng Saisai
- (Russia) Vera Zvonareva

The following players received entry using a protected ranking into the singles main draw:

- (Chinese Taipei) Chan Yung-jan
- (Canada) Aleksandra Wozniak

The following players received entry from the qualifying draw:

- (Germany) Anna-Lena Friedsam
- (Switzerland) Viktorija Golubic
- (Ukraine) Lyudmyla Kichenok
- (Japan) Risa Ozaki

=== Withdrawals ===
Before the tournament

- (Spain) María Teresa Torró Flor → replaced by (Croatia) Donna Vekić
- (Germany) Dinah Pfizenmaier → replaced by (Ukraine) Nadiia Kichenok

During the tournament

- (United States) Vania King (right thigh injury)

=== Retirements ===
- (Hungary) Tímea Babos (gastrointestinal illness)

== Doubles main draw entrants ==
=== Seeds ===
Country	Player	Country	Player	Rank^{1}	Seed
CHN	Zhang Shuai	CHN	Zheng Saisai	95	1
HUN	Tímea Babos	CRO	Petra Martić	123	2
UKR	Irina Buryachok	GEO	Oksana Kalashnikova	125	3
TPE	Chan Yung-Jan	SVK	Janette Husárová	139	4

- ^{1} Rankings as of December 23, 2013

=== Other entrants ===
The following pairs received wildcards into the doubles main draw:

- (China) Liu Fangzhou / (China) You Xiaodi
- (China) Xu Shilin / (China) Sun Ziyue

=== Withdrawals ===
During the tournament

- (Hungary) Tímea Babos (gastrointestinal illness)
