= 2013 WTA Shenzhen Open =

- Date: 31 December 2012 – 6 January 2013
- Edition: 1st
- Draw: 32S / 16D
- Prize money: $500,000
- Surface: Hard
- Location: Shenzhen, China
- Venue: Shenzhen Longgang Sports Center

Champions

Singles
- (China) Li Na

Doubles
- (Chinese Taipei) Chan Hao-ching / (Chinese Taipei) Chan Yung-jan
- WTA Shenzhen Open

The 2013 Shenzhen Open (known as 2013 Shenzhen Gemdale Open for sponsorship reason) was a tennis tournament played on outdoor hard courts. It was the inaugural edition of the Shenzhen Open, and was part of the WTA International tournaments of the 2013 WTA Tour. It took place at the Shenzhen Longgang Sports Center in Shenzhen, China, from 31 December 2012 to 6 January 2013. First-seeded Li Na won the singles title.

== Finals ==
=== Singles ===
- (China) Li Na defeated (Czech Republic) Klára Zakopalová 6–3, 1–6, 7–5
- It was Li's first title of the year and 7th of her career and her first in China since 2004.

=== Doubles ===
- (Chinese Taipei) Chan Hao-ching / (Chinese Taipei) Chan Yung-jan defeated (Ukraine) Irina Buryachok / (Russia) Valeria Solovieva, 6–0, 7–5

== Singles main draw entrants ==
=== Seeds ===
Country	Player	Rank^{1}	Seed
CHN	Li Na	7	1
FRA	Marion Bartoli	11	2
~~SRB~~	~~Jelena Janković~~	~~22~~	~~3~~
TPE	Hsieh Su-wei	25	4
CZE	Klára Zakopalová	28	5
CHN	Peng Shuai	40	6
GBR	Laura Robson	53	7
SRB	Bojana Jovanovski	56	8

- ^{1} Rankings as of December 24, 2012

=== Other entrants ===
The following players received wildcards into the singles main draw:

- (Hong Kong) Chan Wing-yau
- (China) Duan Yingying
- (China) Zheng Saisai

The following players received entry from the qualifying draw:

- (Japan) Kimiko Date-Krumm
- (United Kingdom) Anne Keothavong
- (United States) Jessica Pegula
- (Switzerland) Stefanie Vögele

The following player received entry as lucky loser:

- (China) Zhou Yimiao

=== Withdrawals ===
Before the tournament

- (Czech Republic) Iveta Benešová
- (Serbia) Jelena Janković (viral illness)
- (Croatia) Mirjana Lučić
- (Croatia) Petra Martić
- (Czech Republic) Barbora Záhlavová-Strýcová (doping)

== Doubles main draw entrants ==
=== Seeds ===
Country	Player	Country	Player	Rank^{1}	Seed
TPE	Chan Hao-ching	TPE	Chan Yung-jan	122	1
RUS	Nina Bratchikova	SVK	Janette Husárová	123	2
RUS	Alla Kudryavtseva	CZE	Klára Zakopalová	145	3
HUN	Tímea Babos	LUX	Mandy Minella	161	4

- ^{1} Rankings are as of December 24, 2012.

=== Other entrants ===
The following pair received wildcards into the doubles main draw:

- (China) Han Xinyun / (China) Zhou Yimiao
- (China) Wang Qiang / (Thailand) Varatchaya Wongteanchai

=== Withdrawals ===
During the tournament

- (Chinese Taipei) Hsieh Su-wei (right forearm injury)
