= 2016 WTA Shenzhen Open – Singles =

Singles
- 2016 WTA Shenzhen Open

Final
- Champion: (Poland) Agnieszka Radwańska
- Runner-up: (United States) Alison Riske
- Score: 6–3, 6–2

Details
- Draw: 32 (4 Q / 3 WC )
- Seeds: 8

Events
Singles	Doubles
- WTA Shenzhen Open

Simona Halep was the defending champion, but chose to compete in Brisbane instead.

First-seeded Agnieszka Radwańska won the title, defeating Alison Riske in the final, 6–3, 6–2.

== Seeds ==
1. (Poland) Agnieszka Radwańska (champion)
2. (Czech Republic) Petra Kvitová (first round, retired)
3. (Romania) Irina-Camelia Begu (second round, retired)
4. (Romania) Monica Niculescu (second round)
5. (United Kingdom) Johanna Konta (first round)
6. (Canada) Eugenie Bouchard (quarterfinals)
7. (Kazakhstan) Zarina Diyas (second round)
8. (Germany) Annika Beck (first round)

== Draw ==
Key

- Q = Qualifier
- WC = Wild card
- LL = Lucky loser
- Alt = Alternate
- ITF = ITF entry
- PR = Protected ranking
- SR = Special ranking
- SE = Special exempt
- JE = Junior exempt
- JR = Junior Accelerator Programme entrant
- CO = College Accelerator Programme entrant
- NG = Next Gen Accelerator Program entrant
- w/o = Walkover
- r = Retired
- d = Defaulted

=== Finals ===
Semifinals
1	(Poland) Agnieszka Radwańska	6	6
(Germany) Anna-Lena Friedsam	2	4
(Hungary) Tímea Babos	2	4
(United States) Alison Riske	6	6

Final
1	(Poland) Agnieszka Radwańska	6	6
(United States) Alison Riske	3	2

=== Top half ===
First round
1	(Poland) A Radwańska	6	6
(Serbia) A Krunić	4	3
WC	(China) S Zhang	6	6
WC	(Russia) I Khromacheva	3	3
PR	(United States) V King	7	6
LL	(Switzerland) S Vögele	5	4
(China) Q Wang	6	3	6
5	(United Kingdom) J Konta	3	6	3
3	(Romania) I-C Begu	6	6
(Spain) L Arruabarrena	3	2
(Serbia) B Jovanovski	0	3
(Germany) A-L Friedsam	6	6
(Romania) A Mitu	3	3
(Czech Republic) K Siniaková	6	6
Q	(China) K Zhang	4	6^{3}
7	(Kazakhstan) Z Diyas	6	7^{7}

Second round
1	(Poland) A Radwańska	6	7
WC	(China) S Zhang	1	5
PR	(United States) V King	6^{3}	3
(China) Q Wang	7^{7}	6
3	(Romania) I-C Begu	5	2^{r}
(Germany) A-L Friedsam	7	3
(Czech Republic) K Siniaková	6	6
7	(Kazakhstan) Z Diyas	0	4

Quarterfinals
1	(Poland) A Radwańska	6	6
(China) Q Wang	3	2
(Germany) A-L Friedsam	6	2	6
(Czech Republic) K Siniaková	4	6	1

Semifinals
1	(Poland) A Radwańska	6	6
(Germany) A-L Friedsam	2	4

=== Bottom half ===
First round
6	(Canada) E Bouchard	6	1	7
(Croatia) D Vekić	4	6	5
Q	(United States) N Gibbs	6	6
Q	(Czech Republic) T Smitková	0	2
(Russia) E Rodina	3	2
(Hungary) T Babos	6	6
(Latvia) A Sevastova	6	4	3
4	(Romania) M Niculescu	1	6	6
8	(Germany) A Beck	7^{7}	3	2
(United States) A Riske	6^{3}	6	6
(Chinese Taipei) S-w Hsieh	6	7
WC	(China) Y Duan	4	5
Q	(Kazakhstan) Y Shvedova	4	6^{5}
(Estonia) A Kontaveit	6	7^{7}
(China) S Zheng	6	0
2	(Czech Republic) P Kvitová	2	0^{r}

Second round
6	(Canada) E Bouchard	6	6
Q	(United States) N Gibbs	4	2
(Hungary) T Babos	6	6
4	(Romania) M Niculescu	1	4
(United States) A Riske	3	7	6
(Chinese Taipei) S-w Hsieh	6	5	1
(Estonia) A Kontaveit	6	6
(China) S Zheng	1	2

Quarterfinals
6	(Canada) E Bouchard	4	4
(Hungary) T Babos	6	6
(United States) A Riske	6	3	6
(Estonia) A Kontaveit	1	6	3

Semifinals
(Hungary) T Babos	2	4
(United States) A Riske	6	6

== Qualifying ==
=== Seeds ===
1. (Kazakhstan) Yaroslava Shvedova (qualified)
2. (United States) Nicole Gibbs (qualified)
3. (Switzerland) Stefanie Vögele (qualifying competition, lucky loser)
4. (Romania) Patricia Maria Țig (qualifying competition)
5. (Czech Republic) Tereza Smitková (qualified)
6. (Turkey) Çağla Büyükakçay (qualifying competition)
7. (Spain) María Teresa Torró Flor (qualifying competition)
8. (China) Zhang Kailin (qualified)

=== Lucky losers ===
1. (Switzerland) Stefanie Vögele

=== Qualifying draw ===
==== First qualifier ====
First round
1	(Kazakhstan) Yaroslava Shvedova	6	6
(Russia) Vera Dushevina	0	1
(China) Lu Jiaxi	1	1
6	(Turkey) Çağla Büyükakçay	6	6

Qualifying competition
1	(Kazakhstan) Yaroslava Shvedova	6	7
6	(Turkey) Çağla Büyükakçay	3	5

==== Second qualifier ====
First round
2	(United States) Nicole Gibbs	6	6
(Hong Kong) Zhang Ling	1	2
(China) Xu Yifan	3	6	3
7	(Spain) María Teresa Torró Flor	6	4	6

Qualifying competition
2	(United States) Nicole Gibbs	6	6
7	(Spain) María Teresa Torró Flor	1	3

==== Third qualifier ====
First round
3	(Switzerland) Stefanie Vögele	6	6
(China) Yang Zhaoxuan	3	4
WC	(China) Li Yixuan	3	4
8	(China) Zhang Kailin	6	6

Qualifying competition
3	(Switzerland) Stefanie Vögele	3	6^{4}
8	(China) Zhang Kailin	6	7^{7}

==== Fourth qualifier ====
First round
4	(Romania) Patricia Maria Țig	7	7^{7}
(Belarus) Lidziya Marozava	5	6^{1}
(Thailand) Varatchaya Wongteanchai	6^{4}	6	6^{3}
5	(Czech Republic) Tereza Smitková	7^{7}	3	7^{7}

Qualifying competition
4	(Romania) Patricia Maria Țig	6^{2}	6	3
5	(Czech Republic) Tereza Smitková	7^{7}	3	6
