= 2015 WTA Shenzhen Open =

- Date: 4–10 January 2015
- Edition: 3rd
- Category: WTA International
- Draw: 32S / 16D
- Prize money: $500,000
- Surface: Hard
- Location: Shenzhen, China
- Venue: Shenzhen Longgang Sports Center

Champions

Singles
- (Romania) Simona Halep

Doubles
- (Ukraine) Lyudmyla Kichenok / (Ukraine) Nadiia Kichenok
- WTA Shenzhen Open

The 2015 Shenzhen Open, known as 2015 Shenzhen Gemdale Open for sponsorship reasons, was a tennis tournament played on outdoor hard courts. It was the third edition of the Shenzhen Open, and part of the WTA International tournaments of the 2015 WTA Tour. It took place at the Shenzhen Longgang Sports Center in Shenzhen, China, from 4 to 10 January 2015. First-seeded Simona Halep won the singles title.

== Finals ==
=== Singles ===
- (Romania) Simona Halep defeated (Switzerland) Timea Bacsinszky, 6–2, 6–2

=== Doubles ===
- (Ukraine) Lyudmyla Kichenok / (Ukraine) Nadiia Kichenok defeated (China) Liang Chen / (China) Wang Yafan, 6–4, 7–6^{(8–6)}

== Points and prize money ==
=== Point distribution ===
Event	W	F	SF	QF	Round of 16	Round of 32	Q	Q2	Q1	
Singles	280	180	110	60	30	1	18	12	1	
Doubles	280	180	110	60	1	—N/a	—N/a	—N/a	—N/a	—N/a

=== Prize money ===
Event	W	F	SF	QF	Round of 16	Round of 32^{1}	Q2	Q1
Singles	$111,163	$55,323	$29,730	$8,934	$4,928	$3,199	$1,852	$1,081
Doubles *	$17,724	$9,222	$4,951	$2,623	$1,383	—N/a	—N/a	—N/a

_{^{1} Qualifiers prize money is also the Round of 32 prize money}
_{* per team}

== Singles main-draw entrants ==
=== Seeds ===
Country	Player	Rank^{1}	Seed
ROU	Simona Halep	3	1
CZE	Petra Kvitová	4	2
CHN	Peng Shuai	22	3
KAZ	Zarina Diyas	32	4
CZE	Klára Koukalová	39	5
ROU	Irina-Camelia Begu	40	6
ROU	Monica Niculescu	46	7
SUI	Timea Bacsinszky	47	8

- ^{1} Rankings as of January 5, 2015.

=== Other entrants ===
The following players received wildcards into the singles main draw:

- (China) Duan Yingying
- (Russia) Natalia Vikhlyantseva

The following players received entry from the qualifying draw:

- (Turkey) Çağla Büyükakçay
- (Belarus) Olga Govortsova
- (Serbia) Aleksandra Krunić
- (China) Zhu Lin

=== Withdrawals ===
Before the tournament

- (Romania) Sorana Cîrstea (shoulder injury) → replaced by (Hungary) Tímea Babos

=== Retirements ===
- (Russia) Vera Zvonareva (lower back injury)

== Doubles main-draw entrants ==
=== Seeds ===
Country	Player	Country	Player	Rank^{1}	Seed
CHN	Peng Shuai	CHN	Xu Yifan	76	1
ESP	Lara Arruabarrena	ROU	Irina-Camelia Begu	119	2
ESP	Anabel Medina Garrigues	ESP	María Teresa Torró Flor	122	3
TPE	Chan Chin-wei	GEO	Oksana Kalashnikova	158	4

- ^{1} Rankings as of December 29, 2014

=== Withdrawals ===
During the tournament

- (Russia) Vera Zvonareva (lower back injury)
