= 2016 WTA Shenzhen Open – Doubles =

Doubles
- 2016 WTA Shenzhen Open

Final
- Champions: (United States) Vania King (Romania) Monica Niculescu
- Runners-up: (China) Xu Yifan (China) Zheng Saisai
- Score: 6–1, 6–4

Details
- Draw: 16
- Seeds: 4

Events
| Singles | Doubles |
- WTA Shenzhen Open

Lyudmyla Kichenok and Nadiia Kichenok were the defending champions, but chose to participate in Auckland instead.
Vania King and Monica Niculescu won the title, defeating Xu Yifan and Zheng Saisai in the final, 6–1, 6–4.

== Seeds ==
The top seed received a bye into the second round.

1. (China) Xu Yifan / (China) Zheng Saisai (final)
2. (Chinese Taipei) Chuang Chia-jung / (Georgia (country)) Oksana Kalashnikova (first round)
3. (Russia) Vera Dushevina / (Czech Republic) Kateřina Siniaková (quarterfinals)
4. (Turkey) Çağla Büyükakçay / (Serbia) Aleksandra Krunić (semifinals)

== Draw ==
Key

- Q = Qualifier
- WC = Wild card
- LL = Lucky loser
- Alt = Alternate
- ITF = ITF entry
- PR = Protected ranking
- SR = Special ranking
- SE = Special exempt
- JE = Junior exempt
- JR = Junior Accelerator Programme entrant
- CO = College Accelerator Programme entrant
- NG = Next Gen Accelerator Program entrant
- w/o = Walkover
- r = Retired
- d = Defaulted

First round
(United States) N Gibbs (United States) A Riske | 7^{7} | 6
(Chinese Taipei) C-w Chan (Japan) K Takahata | 6^{5} | 0
4 | (Turkey) Ç Büyükakçay (Serbia) A Krunić | w/o
(Poland) M Linette (China) K Zhang
(China) C Liang (China) S Peng | 6 | 6
WC | (China) Y Li (China) Y Sheng | 2 | 1
(Kazakhstan) Z Diyas (Hong Kong) L Zhang | 2 | 4
(Romania) A Mitu (Romania) PM Țig | 6 | 6
(Germany) A Beck (Russia) E Rodina | 6^{3} | 3
3 | (Russia) V Dushevina (Czech Republic) K Siniaková | 7^{7} | 6
(Thailand) V Wongteanchai (China) Z Yang | 0 | 4
(Russia) I Khromacheva (Belarus) L Marozava | 6 | 6
(United States) V King (Romania) M Niculescu | 7 | 6
2 | (Chinese Taipei) C-j Chuang (Georgia (country)) O Kalashnikova | 5 | 3

Quarterfinals
1 | (China) Y Xu (China) S Zheng | 2 | 6 | [11]
(United States) N Gibbs (United States) A Riske | 6 | 3 | 9
4 | (Turkey) Ç Büyükakçay (Serbia) A Krunić | 4 | 7^{11} | [10]
(China) C Liang (China) S Peng | 6 | 6^{9} | [0]
(Romania) A Mitu (Romania) PM Țig | 6 | 3 | [19]
3 | (Russia) V Dushevina (Czech Republic) K Siniaková | 3 | 6 | [17]
(Russia) I Khromacheva (Belarus) L Marozava | 2 | 6^{5}
(United States) V King (Romania) M Niculescu | 6 | 7^{7}

Semifinals
1 | (China) Y Xu (China) S Zheng | 7^{7} | 6
4 | (Turkey) Ç Büyükakçay (Serbia) A Krunić | 6^{3} | 3
(Romania) A Mitu (Romania) PM Țig | 7 | 6^{2} | [5]
(United States) V King (Romania) M Niculescu | 5 | 7^{7} | [10]

Final
1 | (China) Y Xu (China) S Zheng | 1 | 4
(United States) V King (Romania) M Niculescu | 6 | 6
