= 2013 WTA Shenzhen Open – Doubles =

Doubles
- 2013 WTA Shenzhen Open

Final
- Champions: (Chinese Taipei) Chan Hao-ching (Chinese Taipei) Chan Yung-jan
- Runners-up: (Ukraine) Irina Buryachok (Russia) Valeria Solovieva
- Score: 6–0, 7–5

Details
- Draw: 16
- Seeds: 4

Events
Singles	Doubles
WTA Shenzhen Open	· 2014 →

The first seeded Chan Hao-ching and Chan Yung-jan won the first edition of this tournament, defeating Irina Buryachok and Valeria Solovieva in the final, 6–0, 7–5.

== Seeds ==
1. (Chinese Taipei) Chan Hao-ching / (Chinese Taipei) Chan Yung-jan (champions)
2. (Russia) Nina Bratchikova / (Slovakia) Janette Husárová (quarterfinals)
3. (Russia) Alla Kudryavtseva / (Czech Republic) Klára Zakopalová (first round)
4. (Hungary) Tímea Babos / (Luxembourg) Mandy Minella (first round)

== Draw ==
=== Key ===
- Q = Qualifier
- WC = Wild card
- LL = Lucky loser
- Alt = Alternate
- SE = Special exempt
- PR = Protected ranking
- ITF = ITF entry
- JE = Junior exempt
- w/o = Walkover
- r = Retired
- d = Defaulted
- SR = Special ranking

=== Draw ===
First round
1	(Chinese Taipei) H-c Chan (Chinese Taipei) Y-j Chan	6	6
(Romania) A Cadanțu (United Kingdom) A Keothavong	0	1
WC	(China) X Han (China) Y Zhou	2	7	[10]
(Georgia (country)) O Kalashnikova (China) S Zheng	6	5	[5]
3	(Russia) A Kudryavtseva (Czech Republic) K Zakopalová	2	0
(Italy) ME Camerin (Romania) M Niculescu	6	6
(Japan) S Aoyama (United States) J Pegula	1	6	[10]
(Ukraine) L Kichenok (Ukraine) N Kichenok	6	4	[7]
WC	(China) Q Wang (Thailand) V Wongteanchai	4	0
(Ukraine) I Buryachok (Russia) V Solovieva	6	6
(Chinese Taipei) S-y Hsieh (Chinese Taipei) S-w Hsieh	7^{7}	7^{11}
4	(Hungary) T Babos (Luxembourg) M Minella	6^{3}	6^{9}
(Chinese Taipei) K-c Chang (China) Z Yan	4	6	[10]
(China) W Liu (China) S Sun	6	3	[7]
(Romania) E Gallovits-Hall (Slovenia) A Klepač	4	4
2	(Russia) N Bratchikova (Slovakia) J Husárová	6	6

Quarterfinals
1	(Chinese Taipei) H-c Chan (Chinese Taipei) Y-j Chan	7	3	[10]
WC	(China) X Han (China) Y Zhou	5	6	[6]
(Italy) ME Camerin (Romania) M Niculescu	6	3	[7]
(Japan) S Aoyama (United States) J Pegula	3	6	[10]
(Ukraine) I Buryachok (Russia) V Solovieva	w/o
(Chinese Taipei) S-y Hsieh (Chinese Taipei) S-w Hsieh
(Chinese Taipei) K-c Chang (China) Z Yan	6^{6}	6	[10]
2	(Russia) N Bratchikova (Slovakia) J Husárová	7^{8}	4	[6]

Semifinals
1	(Chinese Taipei) H-c Chan (Chinese Taipei) Y-j Chan	6	7^{8}
(Japan) S Aoyama (United States) J Pegula	0	6^{6}
(Ukraine) I Buryachok (Russia) V Solovieva	6	6
(Chinese Taipei) K-c Chang (China) Z Yan	2	3

Final
1	(Chinese Taipei) H-c Chan (Chinese Taipei) Y-j Chan	6	7
(Ukraine) I Buryachok (Russia) V Solovieva	0	5
