= 2020 WTA Shenzhen Open – Singles =

Singles
- 2020 WTA Shenzhen Open

Final
- Champion: (Russia) Ekaterina Alexandrova
- Runner-up: (Kazakhstan) Elena Rybakina
- Score: 6–2, 6–4

Details
- Draw: 32 (4 Q / 3 WC )
- Seeds: 8

Events
Singles	Doubles
- WTA Shenzhen Open

Aryna Sabalenka was the defending champion, but lost in the second round to Kristýna Plíšková.

Ekaterina Alexandrova won her first WTA singles title, defeating Elena Rybakina in the final, 6–2, 6–4.

== Seeds ==
1. (Switzerland) Belinda Bencic (first round)
2. (Belarus) Aryna Sabalenka (second round)
3. (Belgium) Elise Mertens (quarterfinals)
4. (China) Wang Qiang (quarterfinals)
5. (Russia) Ekaterina Alexandrova (champion)
6. (Spain) Garbiñe Muguruza (semifinals)
7. (Kazakhstan) Elena Rybakina (final)
8. (China) Zhang Shuai (second round)

== Draw ==
Key

- Q = Qualifier
- WC = Wild card
- LL = Lucky loser
- Alt = Alternate
- ITF = ITF entry
- PR = Protected ranking
- SR = Special ranking
- SE = Special exempt
- JE = Junior exempt
- JR = Junior Accelerator Programme entrant
- CO = College Accelerator Programme entrant
- NG = Next Gen Accelerator Program entrant
- w/o = Walkover
- r = Retired
- d = Defaulted

=== Finals ===
Semifinals
6	(Spain) Garbiñe Muguruza	4	3
5	(Russia) Ekaterina Alexandrova	6	6
7	(Kazakhstan) Elena Rybakina	6	7
(Czech Republic) Kristýna Plíšková	2	5

Final
5	(Russia) Ekaterina Alexandrova	6	6
7	(Kazakhstan) Elena Rybakina	2	4

=== Top half ===
First round
1	(Switzerland) B Bencic	6	3	3
(Russia) A Blinkova	3	6	6
WC	(China) Y Duan	3	4
(Kazakhstan) Z Diyas	6	6
PR	(United States) S Rogers	6	5	6
Q	(United States) N Gibbs	3	7	4
WC	(China) Xin Wang	6	3	0
6	(Spain) G Muguruza	3	6	6
4	(China) Q Wang	6	6
(Tunisia) O Jabeur	0	3
(Belarus) A Sasnovich	6	6
Q	(Germany) A-L Friedsam	2	3
(China) S Peng	6	3	6
(China) L Zhu	2	6	3
(Czech Republic) K Siniaková	4	4
5	(Russia) E Alexandrova	6	6

Second round
(Russia) A Blinkova	1	7^{11}	4
(Kazakhstan) Z Diyas	6	6^{9}	6
PR	(United States) S Rogers	1	6^{2}
6	(Spain) G Muguruza	6	7^{7}
4	(China) Q Wang	6	0	7^{7}
(Belarus) A Sasnovich	4	6	6^{5}
(China) S Peng	6^{7}	1
5	(Russia) E Alexandrova	7^{9}	6

Quarterfinals
(Kazakhstan) Z Diyas	4	6	4
6	(Spain) G Muguruza	6	2	6
4	(China) Q Wang	6	4	3
5	(Russia) E Alexandrova	3	6	6

Semifinals
6	(Spain) G Muguruza	4	3
5	(Russia) E Alexandrova	6	6

=== Bottom half ===
First round
7	(Kazakhstan) E Rybakina	6	1	6
(China) S Zheng	2	6	2
(Spain) S Sorribes Tormo	6	1	3
(China) Y Wang	1	6	6
(Romania) S Cîrstea	6	1	1
WC	(China) Xiy Wang	3	6	6
(Ukraine) L Tsurenko	3	3
3	(Belgium) E Mertens	6	6
8	(China) S Zhang	6	6
(Poland) M Linette	4	2
PR	(Ukraine) K Bondarenko	6	6
(Japan) M Doi	4	1
(Czech Republic) Kr Plíšková	6	6
Q	(Romania) I-C Begu	3	3
Q	(Russia) M Gasparyan	3	0
2	(Belarus) A Sabalenka	6	6

Second round
7	(Kazakhstan) E Rybakina	6	6
(China) Y Wang	3	4
WC	(China) Xiy Wang	4	3
3	(Belgium) E Mertens	6	6
8	(China) S Zhang	6^{8}	3
PR	(Ukraine) K Bondarenko	7^{10}	6
(Czech Republic) Kr Plíšková	6	6
2	(Belarus) A Sabalenka	4	4

Quarterfinals
7	(Kazakhstan) E Rybakina	6	4	6
3	(Belgium) E Mertens	4	6	2
PR	(Ukraine) K Bondarenko	4	4
(Czech Republic) Kr Plíšková	6	6

Semifinals
7	(Kazakhstan) E Rybakina	6	7
(Czech Republic) Kr Plíšková	2	5

== Qualifying ==
=== Seeds ===
1. (Germany) Tatjana Maria (first round)
2. (Serbia) Nina Stojanović (first round)
3. (Hungary) Tímea Babos (qualifying competition)
4. (Italy) Jasmine Paolini (qualifying competition)
5. (Romania) Irina-Camelia Begu (qualified)
6. (Russia) Margarita Gasparyan (qualified)
7. (Russia) Varvara Gracheva (qualifying competition)
8. (Romania) Monica Niculescu (first round)

=== Qualifiers ===
1. (Germany) Anna-Lena Friedsam
2. (Romania) Irina-Camelia Begu
3. (Russia) Margarita Gasparyan
4. (United States) Nicole Gibbs

=== Qualifying draw ===
==== First qualifier ====
First round
1	(Germany) Tatjana Maria	1	2
(Germany) Anna-Lena Friedsam	6	6
WC	(China) Yuan Yue	4	3
7	(Russia) Varvara Gracheva	6	6

Qualifying competition
(Germany) Anna-Lena Friedsam	7	6
7	(Russia) Varvara Gracheva	5	4

==== Second qualifier ====
First round
2	(Serbia) Nina Stojanović	4	6	5
(Czech Republic) Barbora Krejčíková	6	2	7
(Switzerland) Stefanie Vögele	5	6	1
5	(Romania) Irina-Camelia Begu	7	3	6

Qualifying competition
(Czech Republic) Barbora Krejčíková	5	2
5	(Romania) Irina-Camelia Begu	7	6

==== Third qualifier ====
First round
3	(Hungary) Tímea Babos	7	6
(Slovenia) Kaja Juvan	5	4
WC	(China) Ma Shuyue	2	1
6	(Russia) Margarita Gasparyan	6	6

Qualifying competition
3	(Hungary) Tímea Babos	3	7^{7}	3
6	(Russia) Margarita Gasparyan	6	6^{3}	6

==== Fourth qualifier ====
First round
4	(Italy) Jasmine Paolini	6	7
(Italy) Martina Trevisan	3	5
(United States) Nicole Gibbs	6	6
8	(Romania) Monica Niculescu	3	3

Qualifying competition
4	(Italy) Jasmine Paolini	3	0
(United States) Nicole Gibbs	6	6
