= 2017 WTA Shenzhen Open – Doubles =

Doubles
- 2017 WTA Shenzhen Open

Final
- Champions: (Czech Republic) Andrea Hlaváčková (China) Peng Shuai
- Runners-up: (Romania) Raluca Olaru (Ukraine) Olga Savchuk
- Score: 6–1, 7–5

Details
- Draw: 16
- Seeds: 4

Events
Singles	Doubles
- WTA Shenzhen Open

Vania King and Monica Niculescu were the defending champions, but King chose not to participate this year. Niculescu played alongside Simona Halep, but lost in the first round to Natela Dzalamidze and Veronika Kudermetova.

Andrea Hlaváčková and Peng Shuai won the title, defeating Raluca Olaru and Olga Savchuk in the final, 6–1, 7–5.

== Seeds ==
1. (United States) Raquel Atawo / (China) Xu Yifan (semifinals, withdrew)
2. (Czech Republic) Andrea Hlaváčková / (China) Peng Shuai (champions)
3. (Romania) Raluca Olaru / (Ukraine) Olga Savchuk (final)
4. (Romania) Simona Halep / (Romania) Monica Niculescu (first round)

== Draw ==
Key

- Q = Qualifier
- WC = Wild card
- LL = Lucky loser
- Alt = Alternate
- ITF = ITF entry
- PR = Protected ranking
- SR = Special ranking
- SE = Special exempt
- JE = Junior exempt
- JR = Junior Accelerator Programme entrant
- CO = College Accelerator Programme entrant
- NG = Next Gen Accelerator Program entrant
- w/o = Walkover
- r = Retired
- d = Defaulted

First round
1	(United States) R Atawo (China) Y Xu	6	7
WC	(China) S Ma (China) K Zhang	3	5
(Thailand) V Wongteanchai (China) X You	7^{7}	0	[4]
(China) X Han (Kazakhstan) G Voskoboeva	6^{4}	6	[10]
3	(Romania) R Olaru (Ukraine) O Savchuk	6	6
WC	(China) Y Duan (China) Q Wang	2	2
(China) C Liang (China) J Lu	7^{7}	6
(Australia) J Moore (Australia) S Sanders	6^{5}	1
(Switzerland) V Golubic (Czech Republic) Kr Plíšková	6	4	[10]
(Russia) A Pivovarova (Latvia) A Sevastova	4	6	[7]
(Russia) N Dzalamidze (Russia) V Kudermetova	6	6
4	(Romania) S Halep (Romania) M Niculescu	3	3
(Serbia) J Janković (Czech Republic) K Siniaková	7^{9}	6
(Switzerland) T Bacsinszky (United Kingdom) J Konta	6^{7}	3
(Serbia) N Stojanović (China) L Zhu	4	5
2	(Czech Republic) A Hlaváčková (China) S Peng	6	7

Quarterfinals
1	(United States) R Atawo (China) Y Xu	6	6
(China) X Han (Kazakhstan) G Voskoboeva	4	4
3	(Romania) R Olaru (Ukraine) O Savchuk	2	7^{7}	[14]
(China) C Liang (China) J Lu	6	6^{5}	[12]
(Switzerland) V Golubic (Czech Republic) Kr Plíšková	5	6	[5]
(Russia) N Dzalamidze (Russia) V Kudermetova	7	1	[10]
(Serbia) J Janković (Czech Republic) K Siniaková	3	3
2	(Czech Republic) A Hlaváčková (China) S Peng	6	6

Semifinals
1	(United States) R Atawo (China) Y Xu
3	(Romania) R Olaru (Ukraine) O Savchuk	w/o
(Russia) N Dzalamidze (Russia) V Kudermetova	4	2
2	(Czech Republic) A Hlaváčková (China) S Peng	6	6

Final
3	(Romania) R Olaru (Ukraine) O Savchuk	1	5
2	(Czech Republic) A Hlaváčková (China) S Peng	6	7
