= 2017 WTA Shenzhen Open – Singles =

Czech Siniaková claims first WTA singles title

Singles
- 2017 WTA Shenzhen Open

Final
- Champion: (Czech Republic) Kateřina Siniaková
- Runner-up: (United States) Alison Riske
- Score: 6–3, 6–4

Details
- Draw: 32 (4 Q / 3 WC )
- Seeds: 8

Events
Singles	Doubles
- WTA Shenzhen Open

Agnieszka Radwańska was the defending champion, but lost in the quarterfinals to Alison Riske.

Unseeded Kateřina Siniaková won her first WTA singles title, defeating Riske in the final, 6–3, 6–4.

== Seeds ==
1. (Poland) Agnieszka Radwańska (quarterfinals)
2. (Romania) Simona Halep (second round)
3. (United Kingdom) Johanna Konta (semifinals)
4. (Switzerland) Timea Bacsinszky (withdrew)
5. (Hungary) Tímea Babos (first round)
6. (Latvia) Anastasija Sevastova (first round)
7. (Romania) Monica Niculescu (second round)
8. (United States) Alison Riske (final)

== Draw ==
Key

- Q = Qualifier
- WC = Wild card
- LL = Lucky loser
- Alt = Alternate
- ITF = ITF entry
- PR = Protected ranking
- SR = Special ranking
- SE = Special exempt
- JE = Junior exempt
- JR = Junior Accelerator Programme entrant
- CO = College Accelerator Programme entrant
- NG = Next Gen Accelerator Program entrant
- w/o = Walkover
- r = Retired
- d = Defaulted

=== Finals ===
Semifinals
8	(United States) Alison Riske	6	6
(Italy) Camila Giorgi	3	3
3	(United Kingdom) Johanna Konta	6	4	4
(Czech Republic) Kateřina Siniaková	1	6	6

Final
8	(United States) Alison Riske	3	4
(Czech Republic) Kateřina Siniaková	6	6

=== Top half ===
First round
1	(Poland) A Radwańska	6	6^{4}	7
WC	(China) Y Duan	2	7^{7}	5
(Slovakia) K Kučová	3	6	4
(Romania) S Cîrstea	6	4	6
(Bulgaria) T Pironkova	6	5	6
PR	(Kazakhstan) G Voskoboeva	4	7	3
WC	(China) L Zhu	6^{5}	6^{5}
8	(United States) A Riske	7^{7}	7^{7}
LL	(Romania) A Bogdan	6	6^{5}	3
(Italy) C Giorgi	1	7^{7}	6
LL	(China) F Liu	7^{8}	0	3
(China) S Zheng	6^{6}	6	6
(Russia) E Rodina	2	3
(China) Q Wang	6	6
WC	(China) K Zhang	7	1	3
7	(Romania) M Niculescu	5	6	6

Second round
1	(Poland) A Radwańska	6	6
(Romania) S Cîrstea	0	3
(Bulgaria) T Pironkova	1	1
8	(United States) A Riske	6	6
(Italy) C Giorgi	6^{5}	7	6
(China) S Zheng	7^{7}	5	4
(China) Q Wang	7^{7}	6
7	(Romania) M Niculescu	6^{1}	4

Quarterfinals
1	(Poland) A Radwańska	2	6	0
8	(United States) A Riske	6	3	6
(Italy) C Giorgi	6	6
(China) Q Wang	0	2

Semifinals
8	(United States) A Riske	6	6
(Italy) C Giorgi	3	3

=== Bottom half ===
First round
6	(Latvia) A Sevastova	6	3	6^{6}
(Czech Republic) Kr Plíšková	1	6	7^{8}
Q	(Chinese Taipei) K-c Chang	7^{7}	6
(Switzerland) V Golubic	6^{4}	1
(Greece) M Sakkari	6	1	2
(United States) V King	2	6	6
(Turkey) Ç Büyükakçay	2	0
3	(United Kingdom) J Konta	6	6
5	(Hungary) T Babos	6	5	2
Q	(Serbia) N Stojanović	1	7	6
Q	(Tunisia) O Jabeur	6	6
Q	(Switzerland) S Vögele	0	2
(China) S Peng	3	5
(Czech Republic) K Siniaková	6	7
(Serbia) J Janković	1	6	3
2	(Romania) S Halep	6	3	6

Second round
(Czech Republic) Kr Plíšková	6	6
Q	(Chinese Taipei) K-c Chang	1	2
(United States) V King	6	3	2
3	(United Kingdom) J Konta	1	6	6
Q	(Serbia) N Stojanović	4	6	6
Q	(Tunisia) O Jabeur	6	3	3
(Czech Republic) K Siniaková	6	4	7
2	(Romania) S Halep	3	6	5

Quarterfinals
(Czech Republic) Kr Plíšková	4	7^{13}	3
3	(United Kingdom) J Konta	6	6^{11}	6
Q	(Serbia) N Stojanović	3	4
(Czech Republic) K Siniaková	6	6

Semifinals
3	(United Kingdom) J Konta	6	4	4
(Czech Republic) K Siniaková	1	6	6

== Qualifying ==
=== Seeds ===
1. (Japan) Risa Ozaki (first round)
2. (Spain) Sara Sorribes Tormo (first round)
3. (Romania) Patricia Maria Țig (first round)
4. (Russia) Ekaterina Alexandrova (first round)
5. (China) Han Xinyun (first round)
6. (Switzerland) Stefanie Vögele (qualified)
7. (Romania) Ana Bogdan (qualifying competition, lucky loser)
8. (Chinese Taipei) Chang Kai-chen (qualified)

=== Qualifiers ===
1. (Chinese Taipei) Chang Kai-chen
2. (Tunisia) Ons Jabeur
3. (Serbia) Nina Stojanović
4. (Switzerland) Stefanie Vögele

=== Lucky loser ===
1. (China) Liu Fangzhou
2. (Romania) Ana Bogdan

=== Qualifying draw ===
==== First qualifier ====
First round
1	(Japan) Risa Ozaki	7^{7}	4	1
(Russia) Anastasia Pivovarova	6^{5}	6	6
(Bulgaria) Isabella Shinikova	6	5	6^{5}
8	(Chinese Taipei) Chang Kai-chen	2	7	7^{7}

Qualifying competition
(Russia) Anastasia Pivovarova	2	4
8	(Chinese Taipei) Chang Kai-chen	6	6

==== Second qualifier ====
First round
2	(Spain) Sara Sorribes Tormo	0	3
(Tunisia) Ons Jabeur	6	6
(China) Liu Fangzhou	6	4	7
5	(China) Han Xinyun	1	6	5

Qualifying competition
(Tunisia) Ons Jabeur	6	6
(China) Liu Fangzhou	2	2

==== Third qualifier ====
First round
3	(Romania) Patricia Maria Țig	7^{7}	3	4
(Serbia) Nina Stojanović	6^{3}	6	6
WC	(China) Tang Qianhui	2	2
7	(Romania) Ana Bogdan	6	6

Qualifying competition
(Serbia) Nina Stojanović	6^{5}	6	6
7	(Romania) Ana Bogdan	7^{7}	4	4

==== Fourth qualifier ====
First round
4	(Russia) Ekaterina Alexandrova	3	6	3
(Russia) Anastasiya Komardina	6	3	6
Alt	(Russia) Veronika Kudermetova	5	5
6	(Switzerland) Stefanie Vögele	7	7

Qualifying competition
(Russia) Anastasiya Komardina	3	2
6	(Switzerland) Stefanie Vögele	6	6
