= 2019 WTA Shenzhen Open – Singles =

Singles
- 2019 WTA Shenzhen Open

Final
- Champion: (Belarus) Aryna Sabalenka
- Runner-up: (United States) Alison Riske
- Score: 4–6, 7–6^{(7–2)}, 6–3

Details
- Draw: 32 (4 Q / 3 WC )
- Seeds: 8

Events
Singles	Doubles
- WTA Shenzhen Open

Simona Halep was the defending champion, but chose to not participate.

Aryna Sabalenka won the title, defeating Alison Riske in the final, 4–6, 7–6^{(7–2)}, 6–3.

== Seeds ==
1. (Belarus) Aryna Sabalenka (champion)
2. (France) Caroline Garcia (first round)
3. (China) Wang Qiang (first round)
4. (Latvia) Jeļena Ostapenko (first round)
5. (Russia) Maria Sharapova (quarterfinals, retired)
6. (China) Zheng Saisai (first round)
7. (China) Zhang Shuai (first round)
8. (Russia) Anastasia Pavlyuchenkova (second round)

== Draw ==
=== Finals ===
Semifinals
1	(Belarus) Aryna Sabalenka	6	6
(China) Wang Yafan	2	1
(United States) Alison Riske	6	1
WC	(Russia) Vera Zvonareva	0	0^{r}

Final
1	(Belarus) Aryna Sabalenka	4	7^{7}	6
(United States) Alison Riske	6	6^{2}	3

=== Top half ===
First round
1	(Belarus) A Sabalenka	3	6	6
(Germany) T Maria	6	3	1
(Russia) E Alexandrova	6	6
(Slovenia) D Jakupović	3	4
WC	(China) Xin Wang	7^{7}	6
Q	(China) F Xun	6^{3}	4
PR	(Switzerland) T Bacsinszky	2	6^{3}
5	(Russia) M Sharapova	6	7^{7}
4	(Latvia) J Ostapenko	0	2
Q	(Romania) M Niculescu	6	6
WC	(China) S Peng	6	6^{6}	3^{r}
(Czech Republic) Kr Plíšková	3	7^{8}	3
(Slovakia) AK Schmiedlová	1	0
(China) Y Wang	6	6
(Tunisia) O Jabeur	6	6
7	(China) S Zhang	2	3

Second round
1	(Belarus) A Sabalenka	6	6
(Russia) E Alexandrova	3	3
WC	(China) Xin Wang	7^{7}	2^{r}
5	(Russia) M Sharapova	6^{4}	5
Q	(Romania) M Niculescu	6^{2}	6	6
(Czech Republic) Kr Plíšková	7^{7}	3	4
(China) Y Wang	3	6	6
(Tunisia) O Jabeur	6	4	4

Quarterfinals
1	(Belarus) A Sabalenka	6	4
5	(Russia) M Sharapova	1	2^{r}
Q	(Romania) M Niculescu	6	6^{4}	1
(China) Y Wang	2	7^{7}	6

Semifinals
1	(Belarus) A Sabalenka	6	6
(China) Y Wang	2	1

=== Bottom half ===
First round
6	(China) S Zheng	2	6	2
(France) P Parmentier	6	3	6
(Romania) S Cîrstea	6	6
(Poland) M Linette	3	3
(Russia) E Rodina	3	6	7^{9}
(Kazakhstan) Z Diyas	6	3	6^{7}
(United States) A Riske	6	6
3	(China) Q Wang	3	3
8	(Russia) A Pavlyuchenkova	6	6
(Romania) A Bogdan	0	1
(Romania) I-C Begu	6	1	6^{5}
Q	(Russia) V Kudermetova	3	6	7^{7}
(Thailand) L Kumkhum	3	3
WC	(Russia) V Zvonareva	6	6
Q	(Serbia) I Jorović	6	6
2	(France) C Garcia	4	2

Second round
(France) P Parmentier	2	2
(Romania) S Cîrstea	6	6
(Russia) E Rodina	6	2	3
(United States) A Riske	4	6	6
8	(Russia) A Pavlyuchenkova	2	6	2
Q	(Russia) V Kudermetova	6	1	6
WC	(Russia) V Zvonareva	7	4	6
Q	(Serbia) I Jorović	5	6	4

Quarterfinals
(Romania) S Cîrstea	5	1
(United States) A Riske	7	6
Q	(Russia) V Kudermetova	6	5	3
WC	(Russia) V Zvonareva	4	7	6

Semifinals
(United States) A Riske	6	1
WC	(Russia) V Zvonareva	0	0^{r}

== Qualifying ==
=== Seeds ===
1. (Russia) Anna Blinkova (qualifying competition)
2. (Romania) Monica Niculescu (qualified)
3. (France) Fiona Ferro (withdrew due to abdominal injury)
4. (Ukraine) Anhelina Kalinina (qualifying competition)
5. (Japan) Nao Hibino (qualifying competition)
6. (China) Zhu Lin (qualifying competition)
7. (Serbia) Ivana Jorović (qualified)
8. (Russia) Veronika Kudermetova (qualified)

=== Qualifiers ===
1. (Russia) Veronika Kudermetova
2. (Romania) Monica Niculescu
3. (China) Xun Fangying
4. (Serbia) Ivana Jorović

=== Qualifying draw ===
==== First qualifier ====
First round
1	(Russia) Anna Blinkova	6	6
(China) Duan Yingying	4	4
(Montenegro) Danka Kovinić	4	5
8	(Russia) Veronika Kudermetova	6	7

Qualifying competition
1	(Russia) Anna Blinkova	1	6	6^{6}
8	(Russia) Veronika Kudermetova	6	3	7^{8}

==== Second qualifier ====
First round
2	(Romania) Monica Niculescu	6	6
(Russia) Irina Khromacheva	0	3
(Russia) Natalia Vikhlyantseva	2	2
5	(Japan) Nao Hibino	6	6

Qualifying competition
2	(Romania) Monica Niculescu	6	6
5	(Japan) Nao Hibino	2	2

==== Third qualifier ====
First round
Alt	(China) Xun Fangying	7^{7}	6
WC	(China) Yang Zhaoxuan	6^{4}	4
(Spain) Georgina García Pérez	4	6^{5}
6	(China) Zhu Lin	6	7^{7}

Qualifying competition
Alt	(China) Xun Fangying	6	4	7^{7}
6	(China) Zhu Lin	3	6	6^{2}

==== Fourth qualifier ====
First round
4	(Ukraine) Anhelina Kalinina	6	6
(China) Liu Fangzhou	4	3
(Romania) Irina Bara	5	4
7	(Serbia) Ivana Jorović	7	6

Qualifying competition
4	(Ukraine) Anhelina Kalinina	0	7	0
7	(Serbia) Ivana Jorović	6	5	6
