= 2020 WTA Shenzhen Open =

- Date: 5–11 January 2020
- Edition: 8th
- Category: WTA International
- Draw: 32S / 16D
- Prize money: $775,000
- Surface: Hard
- Location: Shenzhen, China
- Venue: Shenzhen Longgang Sports Center

Champions

Singles
- (Russia) Ekaterina Alexandrova

Doubles
- (Czech Republic) Barbora Krejčíková / (Czech Republic) Kateřina Siniaková
- WTA Shenzhen Open

The 2020 Shenzhen Open was a women's tennis tournament played on outdoor hard courts. It was the eighth edition of the Shenzhen Open, and part of the WTA International tournaments of the 2020 WTA Tour. It took place at the Shenzhen Longgang Sports Center in Shenzhen, China, from 5 January until 11 January 2020. Fifth-seeded Ekaterina Alexandrova won the singles title.

== Finals ==
=== Singles ===
- (Russia) Ekaterina Alexandrova defeated (Kazakhstan) Elena Rybakina, 6–2, 6–4

=== Doubles ===
- (Czech Republic) Barbora Krejčíková / (Czech Republic) Kateřina Siniaková defeated (China) Duan Yingying / (China) Zheng Saisai, 6–2, 3–6, [10–4]

== Points and prize money ==
=== Point distribution ===
Event	W	F	SF	QF	Round of 16	Round of 32	Q	Q2	Q1
Singles	280	180	110	60	30	1	18	12	1
Doubles	280	180	110	60	1	—N/a	—N/a	—N/a	—N/a

=== Prize money ===
Event	W	F	SF	QF	Round of 16	Round of 32^{1}	Q2	Q1
Singles	$175,000	$88,402	$46,800	$11,271	$6,450	$4,205	$4,251	$2,930
Doubles *	$25,580	$13,600	$7,400	$4,100	$2,470	—N/a	—N/a	—N/a

_{^{1} Qualifiers prize money is also the Round of 32 prize money}
_{* per team}

== Singles main draw entrants ==
=== Seeds ===
Country	Player	Rank^{1}	Seed
SUI	Belinda Bencic	8	1
BLR	Aryna Sabalenka	11	2
BEL	Elise Mertens	17	3
CHN	Wang Qiang	30	4
RUS	Ekaterina Alexandrova	35	5
ESP	Garbiñe Muguruza	36	6
KAZ	Elena Rybakina	37	7
CHN	Zhang Shuai	40	8

- ^{1} Rankings as of December 30, 2019.

=== Other entrants ===
The following players received wildcards into the singles main draw:

- (China) Duan Yingying
- (China) Wang Xinyu
- (China) Wang Xiyu

The following players received entry into the singles main draw using a protected ranking:

- (Ukraine) Kateryna Bondarenko
- (United States) Shelby Rogers

The following players received entry from the qualifying draw:

- (Romania) Irina-Camelia Begu
- (Germany) Anna-Lena Friedsam
- (Russia) Margarita Gasparyan
- (United States) Nicole Gibbs

== Doubles main draw entrants ==
=== Seeds ===
Country	Player	Country	Player	Rank^{1}	Seed
BEL	Elise Mertens	BLR	Aryna Sabalenka	11	1
CZE	Barbora Krejčíková	CZE	Kateřina Siniaková	20	2
CHN	Duan Yingying	CHN	Zheng Saisai	42	3
CHN	Peng Shuai	CHN	Zhang Shuai	60	4

- ^{1} Rankings as of December 30, 2019

=== Other entrants ===
The following pairs received wildcards into the doubles main draw:

- (China) Jiang Xinyu / (China) Tang Qianhui
- (China) Ma Shuyue / (China) Yuan Yue

The following pair received entry into the doubles main draw using a protected ranking:

- (Ukraine) Kateryna Bondarenko / (Belarus) Lidziya Marozava
