= 2014 WTA Shenzhen Open – Singles =

Singles
- 2014 WTA Shenzhen Open

Final
- Champion: (China) Li Na
- Runner-up: (China) Peng Shuai
- Score: 6–4, 7–5

Details
- Draw: 32 (4 Q / 3 WC )
- Seeds: 8

Events
Singles	Doubles
- WTA Shenzhen Open

First-seeded Li Na was the defending champion and successfully retained her title, defeating Peng Shuai in the final, 6–4, 7–5.

== Seeds ==
1. (China) Li Na (champion)
2. (Italy) Sara Errani (second round)
3. (Czech Republic) Klára Zakopalová (second round)
4. (Serbia) Bojana Jovanovski (first round)

5. (China) Peng Shuai (final)
6. (China) Zhang Shuai (first round)
7. (China) Zheng Jie (second round)
8. (Germany) Annika Beck (semifinals)

== Draw ==
=== Finals ===
Semifinals
1	(China) Li Na	6	6
8	(Germany) Annika Beck	1	3
5	(China) Peng Shuai	w/o
(United States) Vania King

Final
1	(China) Li Na	6	7
5	(China) Peng Shuai	4	5

=== Top half ===
First round
1	(China) N Li	7	6
WC	(Russia) V Zvonareva	5	3
(Hungary) T Babos	0	0^{r}
(Ukraine) N Kichenok	6	2
(Romania) M Niculescu	4	6	6
(Slovakia) A Schmiedlová	6	2	3
PR	(Chinese Taipei) Y-j Chan	3	6	6
6	(China) S Zhang	6	4	2
3	(Czech Republic) K Zakopalová	6	7
(Croatia) D Vekić	3	5
(Austria) P Mayr-Achleitner	6	6
Q	(Japan) R Ozaki	2	1
Q	(Switzerland) V Golubic	4	6	6
PR	(Canada) A Wozniak	6	0	2
(Croatia) A Tomljanović	3	4
8	(Germany) A Beck	6	6

Second round
1	(China) N Li	6	6
(Ukraine) N Kichenok	1	4
(Romania) M Niculescu	2	6	6
PR	(Chinese Taipei) Y-j Chan	6	3	0
3	(Czech Republic) K Zakopalová	6^{2}	4
(Austria) P Mayr-Achleitner	7^{7}	6
Q	(Switzerland) V Golubic	3	7	3
8	(Germany) A Beck	6	5	6

Quarterfinals
1	(China) N Li	7	4	6
(Romania) M Niculescu	5	6	4
(Austria) P Mayr-Achleitner	6	3	1
8	(Germany) A Beck	3	6	6

Semifinals
1	(China) N Li	6	6
8	(Germany) A Beck	1	3

=== Bottom half ===
First round
5	(China) S Peng	6	6
WC	(China) F Liu	1	3
(Spain) S Soler Espinosa	6	7^{7}
(Ukraine) L Tsurenko	4	6^{4}
Q	(Ukraine) L Kichenok	6	3	1
(Slovakia) J Čepelová	4	6	6
Q	(Germany) A-L Friedsam	6	7
4	(Serbia) B Jovanovski	1	5
7	(China) J Zheng	6	6
(Israel) S Pe'er	0	3
(Belarus) O Govortsova	5	3
(Czech Republic) B Záhlavová-Strýcová	7	6
(Croatia) P Martić	5	6	3
(United States) V King	7	4	6
WC	(China) S Zheng	0	6	6^{3}
2	(Italy) S Errani	6	3	7^{7}

Second round
5	(China) S Peng	6	6
(Spain) S Soler Espinosa	3	3
(Slovakia) J Čepelová	6	6
Q	(Germany) A-L Friedsam	4	1
7	(China) J Zheng	0	6^{6}
(Czech Republic) B Záhlavová-Strýcová	6	7^{8}
(United States) V King	2	7^{9}	6
2	(Italy) S Errani	6	6^{7}	3

Quarterfinals
5	(China) S Peng	6	6
(Slovakia) J Čepelová	3	2
(Czech Republic) B Záhlavová-Strýcová	2	4
(United States) V King	6	6

Semifinals
5	(China) S Peng	w/o
(United States) V King

== Qualifying ==
=== Seeds ===
1. (Thailand) Luksika Kumkhum (qualifying competition)
2. (Bulgaria) Tsvetana Pironkova (qualifying competition)
3. (United Kingdom) Johanna Konta (first round)
4. (Spain) Estrella Cabeza Candela (qualifying competition)
5. (Germany) Anna-Lena Friedsam (qualified)
6. (Serbia) Aleksandra Krunić (first round)
7. (Romania) Alexandra Dulgheru (first round)
8. (China) Duan Yingying (first round)

=== Qualifiers ===
1. (Germany) Anna-Lena Friedsam
2. (Switzerland) Viktorija Golubic
3. (Ukraine) Lyudmyla Kichenok
4. (Japan) Risa Ozaki

=== Draw ===
==== First qualifier ====
First round
1	(Thailand) Luksika Kumkhum	6	7
(China) Wang Qiang	0	5
(China) Wang Yafan	6	3	6^{1}
5	(Germany) Anna-Lena Friedsam	3	6	7^{7}

Qualifying competition
1	(Thailand) Luksika Kumkhum	1	3
5	(Germany) Anna-Lena Friedsam	6	6

==== Second qualifier ====
First round
2	(Bulgaria) Tsvetana Pironkova	6	6
(Georgia (country)) Oksana Kalashnikova	2	1
(Switzerland) Viktorija Golubic	6	6
8	(China) Duan Yingying	3	3

Qualifying competition
2	(Bulgaria) Tsvetana Pironkova	4	3
(Switzerland) Viktorija Golubic	6	6

==== Third qualifier ====
First round
3	(United Kingdom) Johanna Konta	5	1
WC	(China) Xu Shilin	7	6
(Ukraine) Lyudmyla Kichenok	6	4	6
7	(Romania) Alexandra Dulgheru	4	6	3

Qualifying competition
WC	(China) Xu Shilin	0	3
(Ukraine) Lyudmyla Kichenok	6	6

==== Fourth qualifier ====
First round
4	(Spain) Estrella Cabeza Candela	6	6
WC	(China) Yang Zhaoxuan	1	3
(Japan) Risa Ozaki	7^{7}	4	7
6	(Serbia) Aleksandra Krunić	6^{3}	6	5

Qualifying competition
4	(Spain) Estrella Cabeza Candela	1	6	3
(Japan) Risa Ozaki	6	3	6
