= 2015 WTA Shenzhen Open – Singles =

Singles
- 2015 WTA Shenzhen Open

Final
- Champion: (Romania) Simona Halep
- Runner-up: (Switzerland) Timea Bacsinszky
- Score: 6–2, 6–2

Details
- Draw: 32 (4 Q / 2 WC )
- Seeds: 8

Events
Singles	Doubles
- WTA Shenzhen Open

Li Na was the two-time defending champion, but retired from professional tennis on 19 September 2014.

First-seeded Simona Halep won the title, defeating Timea Bacsinszky in the final, 6–2, 6–2.

== Seeds ==
1. (Romania) Simona Halep (champion)
2. (Czech Republic) Petra Kvitová (semifinals)
3. (China) Peng Shuai (first round)
4. (Kazakhstan) Zarina Diyas (quarterfinals)
5. (Czech Republic) Klára Koukalová (first round)
6. (Romania) Irina-Camelia Begu (first round)
7. (Romania) Monica Niculescu (first round)
8. (Switzerland) Timea Bacsinszky (final)

== Draw ==
=== Finals ===
Semifinals
1	(Romania) Simona Halep	6	6
(China) Zheng Saisai	2	3
8	(Switzerland) Timea Bacsinszky	6	6
2	(Czech Republic) Petra Kvitová	4	4

Final
1	(Romania) Simona Halep	6	6
8	(Switzerland) Timea Bacsinszky	2	2

=== Top half ===
First round
1	(Romania) S Halep	4	6	6
(Germany) A Beck	6	4	3
(Germany) A-L Friedsam	6	3	3
WC	(Russia) N Vikhlyantseva	2	6	6
Q	(Serbia) A Krunić	6	7^{7}
Q	(China) L Zhu	4	6^{4}
(Slovakia) A Schmiedlová	6	4	7^{7}
5	(Czech Republic) K Koukalová	3	6	6^{5}
4	(Kazakhstan) Z Diyas	6	6
(Croatia) D Vekić	3	1
(Hungary) T Babos	6^{4}	6	6
(China) Q Wang	7^{7}	1	4
(Romania) A Dulgheru	5	7	1
(China) S Zheng	7	5	6
(Slovenia) P Hercog	6	7
7	(Romania) M Niculescu	1	5

Second round
1	(Romania) S Halep	6	6
WC	(Russia) N Vikhlyantseva	2	2
Q	(Serbia) A Krunić	3	7^{7}	6
(Slovakia) A Schmiedlová	6	6^{1}	1
4	(Kazakhstan) Z Diyas	6	6
(Hungary) T Babos	3	4
(China) S Zheng	6	2	6
(Slovenia) P Hercog	3	6	2

Quarterfinals
1	(Romania) S Halep	6	6
Q	(Serbia) A Krunić	3	3
4	(Kazakhstan) Z Diyas	6	6^{2}	2
(China) S Zheng	3	7^{7}	6

Semifinals
1	(Romania) S Halep	6	6
(China) S Zheng	2	3

=== Bottom half ===
First round
8	(Switzerland) T Bacsinszky	6	4	6
(Switzerland) S Vögele	1	6	4
(Italy) K Knapp	6	6
(France) P Parmentier	3	3
Q	(Turkey) Ç Büyükakçay	6	6
(Spain) L Arruabarrena	4	3
PR	(Russia) V Zvonareva	4	6	6
3	(China) S Peng	6	4	3
6	(Romania) I-C Begu	7^{7}	4	1
(Czech Republic) K Siniaková	6^{5}	6	6
Q	(Belarus) O Govortsova	6	3	3
(Czech Republic) T Smitková	3	6	6
(Spain) MT Torró Flor	2	7^{7}	3
(Serbia) B Jovanovski	6	6^{4}	6
WC	(China) Y Duan	3	1
2	(Czech Republic) P Kvitová	6	6

Second round
8	(Switzerland) T Bacsinszky	7	6
(Italy) K Knapp	5	2
Q	(Turkey) Ç Büyükakçay	3	6^{5}
PR	(Russia) V Zvonareva	6	7^{7}
(Czech Republic) K Siniaková	3	6	1
(Czech Republic) T Smitková	6	2	6
(Serbia) B Jovanovski	1	2
2	(Czech Republic) P Kvitová	6	6

Quarterfinals
8	(Switzerland) T Bacsinszky	3
PR	(Russia) V Zvonareva	2^{r}
(Czech Republic) T Smitková	5	4
2	(Czech Republic) P Kvitová	7	6

Semifinals
8	(Switzerland) T Bacsinszky	6	6
2	(Czech Republic) P Kvitová	4	4

== Qualifying ==
=== Seeds ===
1. (Serbia) Aleksandra Krunić (qualified)
2. (Germany) Carina Witthöft (first round)
3. (Austria) Patricia Mayr-Achleitner (first round)
4. (Thailand) Luksika Kumkhum (qualifying competition)
5. (Israel) Shahar Pe'er (first round)
6. (Poland) Magda Linette (first round)
7. (China) Zhu Lin (qualified)
8. (Turkey) Çağla Büyükakçay (qualified)

=== Qualifiers ===
1. (Serbia) Aleksandra Krunić
2. (Turkey) Çağla Büyükakçay
3. (Belarus) Olga Govortsova
4. (China) Zhu Lin

=== Qualifying draw ===
==== First qualifier ====
First round
1	(Serbia) Aleksandra Krunić	6	4	7
(China) Liu Fangzhou	2	6	5
WC	(China) Yang Zhaoxuan	6	6
5	(Israel) Shahar Pe'er	1	0

Qualifying competition
1	(Serbia) Aleksandra Krunić	7^{8}	6
WC	(China) Yang Zhaoxuan	6^{6}	3

==== Second qualifier ====
First round
2	(Germany) Carina Witthöft	6	2	6^{3}
(Uzbekistan) Nigina Abduraimova	2	6	7^{7}
WC	(China) Xu Shilin	1	6^{5}
8	(Turkey) Çağla Büyükakçay	6	7^{7}

Qualifying competition
(Uzbekistan) Nigina Abduraimova	3	1
8	(Turkey) Çağla Büyükakçay	6	6

==== Third qualifier ====
First round
3	(Austria) Patricia Mayr-Achleitner	6	4	1
(China) Wang Yafan	4	6	6
(Belarus) Olga Govortsova	6^{4}	6	6
6	(Poland) Magda Linette	7^{7}	2	2

Qualifying competition
(China) Wang Yafan	6	3	4
(Belarus) Olga Govortsova	4	6	6

==== Fourth qualifier ====
First round
4	(Thailand) Luksika Kumkhum	6	6
(Japan) Risa Ozaki	2	2
(United Kingdom) Johanna Konta	6	6^{3}	4
7	(China) Zhu Lin	3	7^{7}	6

Qualifying competition
4	(Thailand) Luksika Kumkhum	4	6	3
7	(China) Zhu Lin	6	3	6
