= 2013 WTA Shenzhen Open – Singles =

Singles
- 2013 WTA Shenzhen Open

Final
- Champion: (China) Li Na
- Runner-up: (Czech Republic) Klára Zakopalová
- Score: 6–3, 1–6, 7–5

Details
- Draw: 32 (4 Q / 3 WC )
- Seeds: 8

Events
Singles	Doubles
- WTA Shenzhen Open

Top-seeded Li Na won the first edition of this tournament, defeating Klára Zakopalová in the final, 6–3, 1–6, 7–5.

== Seeds ==
1. (China) Li Na (champion)
2. (France) Marion Bartoli (quarterfinals)
3. (Serbia) Jelena Janković (withdrew)
4. (Chinese Taipei) Hsieh Su-wei (second round)
5. (Czech Republic) Klára Zakopalová (final)
6. (China) Peng Shuai (semifinals)
7. (United Kingdom) Laura Robson (second round)
8. (Serbia) Bojana Jovanovski (quarterfinals)

== Draw ==
=== Finals ===
Semifinals
1	(China) Li Na	6	6
6	(China) Peng Shuai	4	0
(Romania) Monica Niculescu	1	3
5	(Czech Republic) Klára Zakopalová	6	6

Final
1	(China) Li Na	6	1	7
5	(Czech Republic) Klára Zakopalová	3	6	5

=== Top half ===
First round
1	(China) N Li	6	6
(Luxembourg) M Minella	4	0
(Russia) N Bratchikova	6	6^{7}	5
(United States) J Cohen	0	7^{9}	7
WC	(China) Y Duan	7^{7}	7
Q	(Japan) K Date-Krumm	6^{5}	5
(Romania) A Cadanțu	3	1
8	(Serbia) B Jovanovski	6	6
4	(Chinese Taipei) S-w Hsieh	6	6
(Hungary) M Czink	3	2
(Spain) G Muguruza	2	7^{9}	4
(Germany) A Beck	6	6^{7}	6
(Chinese Taipei) Y-j Chan	4	4
(Japan) A Morita	6	6
Q	(United Kingdom) A Keothavong	4	0
6	(China) S Peng	6	6

Second round
1	(China) N Li	6	6
(United States) J Cohen	3	4
WC	(China) Y Duan	3	1
8	(Serbia) B Jovanovski	6	6
4	(Chinese Taipei) S-w Hsieh	3	0
(Germany) A Beck	6	6
(Japan) A Morita	1	1
6	(China) S Peng	6	6

Quarterfinals
1	(China) N Li	6	6
8	(Serbia) B Jovanovski	3	3
(Germany) A Beck	6	5	2
6	(China) S Peng	2	7	6

Semifinals
1	(China) N Li	6	6
6	(China) S Peng	4	0

=== Bottom half ===
First round
7	(United Kingdom) L Robson	6	6
(Romania) E Gallovits-Hall	2	1
WC	(China) S Zheng	4	5
(Romania) M Niculescu	6	7
(Spain) S Soler Espinosa	6	1	3
(Chinese Taipei) K-c Chang	4	6	6
Q	(United States) J Pegula	4	2
LL	(China) Y Zhou	6	6
5	(Czech Republic) K Zakopalová	6	6
(Czech Republic) A Hlaváčková	1	1
(Israel) S Pe'er	1	3
(Ukraine) E Svitolina	6	6
(Hungary) T Babos	4	5
Q	(Switzerland) S Vögele	6	7
WC	(Hong Kong) V Chan	1	0
2	(France) M Bartoli	6	6

Second round
7	(United Kingdom) L Robson	2	3
(Romania) M Niculescu	6	6
(Chinese Taipei) K-c Chang	6	2	6^{3}
LL	(China) Y Zhou	4	6	7^{7}
5	(Czech Republic) K Zakopalová	6	6
(Ukraine) E Svitolina	4	3
Q	(Switzerland) S Vögele	5	4
2	(France) M Bartoli	7	6

Quarterfinals
(Romania) M Niculescu	6	6
LL	(China) Y Zhou	4	2
5	(Czech Republic) K Zakopalová	6	6
2	(France) M Bartoli	3	2

Semifinals
(Romania) M Niculescu	1	3
5	(Czech Republic) K Zakopalová	6	6

== Qualifying ==
=== Seeds ===
1. (Switzerland) Stefanie Vögele (qualified)
2. (Japan) Kimiko Date-Krumm (qualified)
3. (United Kingdom) Anne Keothavong (qualified)
4. (United States) Jessica Pegula (qualified)
5. (France) Caroline Garcia (qualifying competition)
6. (Italy) Nastassja Burnett (qualifying competition)
7. (Italy) Maria Elena Camerin (first round)
8. (China) Zhou Yi-Miao (qualifying competition, lucky loser)

=== Qualifiers ===
1. (Switzerland) Stefanie Vögele
2. (Japan) Kimiko Date-Krumm
3. (United Kingdom) Anne Keothavong
4. (United States) Jessica Pegula

=== Lucky losers ===
1. (China) Zhou Yimiao

=== Draw ===
==== First qualifier ====
First round
1	(Switzerland) Stefanie Vögele	2	6	6
(Kazakhstan) Zarina Diyas	6	3	2
(Russia) Valeria Solovieva	3	4
5	(France) Caroline Garcia	6	6

Qualifying competition
1	(Switzerland) Stefanie Vögele	6	6
5	(France) Caroline Garcia	2	2

==== Second qualifier ====
First round
2	(Japan) Kimiko Date-Krumm	6	6
WC	(China) Zhang Yuxuan	4	1
(Croatia) Tereza Mrdeža	3	4
8	(China) Zhou Yimiao	6	6

Qualifying competition
2	(Japan) Kimiko Date-Krumm	6	6
8	(China) Zhou Yimiao	2	3

==== Third qualifier ====
First round
3	(United Kingdom) Anne Keothavong	6	4	6
WC	(China) Xu Shilin	3	6	0
(Japan) Yurika Sema	1	3
6	(Italy) Nastassja Burnett	6	6

Qualifying competition
3	(United Kingdom) Anne Keothavong	6	6
6	(Italy) Nastassja Burnett	3	4

==== Fourth qualifier ====
First round
4	(United States) Jessica Pegula	6	3	6
(Ukraine) Lyudmyla Kichenok	1	6	0
(China) Wang Qiang	6	6
7	(Italy) Maria Elena Camerin	2	4

Qualifying competition
4	(United States) Jessica Pegula	7^{9}	7
(China) Wang Qiang	6^{7}	5
