= 2018 WTA Shenzhen Open – Singles =

Singles
- 2018 WTA Shenzhen Open

Final
- Champion: (Romania) Simona Halep
- Runner-up: (Czech Republic) Kateřina Siniaková
- Score: 6–1, 2–6, 6–0

Details
- Draw: 32 (4 Q / 3 WC )
- Seeds: 8

Events
Singles	Doubles
- WTA Shenzhen Open

Simona Halep won the title, defeating defending champion Kateřina Siniaková in the final, 6–1, 2–6, 6–0.

== Seeds ==
1. (Romania) Simona Halep (champion)
2. (Latvia) Jeļena Ostapenko (first round)
3. (China) Zhang Shuai (second round)
4. (Romania) Irina-Camelia Begu (semifinals)
5. (China) Wang Qiang (first round)
6. (Czech Republic) Kateřina Siniaková (final)
7. (Greece) Maria Sakkari (first round)
8. (Hungary) Tímea Babos (quarterfinals)

== Draw ==
=== Finals ===
Semifinals
1	(Romania) Simona Halep	6	6
4	(Romania) Irina-Camelia Begu	1	4
(Russia) Maria Sharapova	2	6	3
6	(Czech Republic) Kateřina Siniaková	6	3	6

Final
1	(Romania) Simona Halep	6	2	6
6	(Czech Republic) Kateřina Siniaková	1	6	0

=== Top half ===
First round
1	(Romania) S Halep	6	6
(United States) N Gibbs	4	1
(China) Y Duan	6	7
(Russia) E Rodina	2	5
(Romania) M Niculescu	4	4
(Belarus) A Sabalenka	6	6
Q	(Montenegro) D Kovinić	4	6	6
7	(Greece) M Sakkari	6	2	3
4	(Romania) I-C Begu	6	6
WC	(China) F Liu	1	2
Q	(Switzerland) S Vögele	2	3
(Russia) E Alexandrova	6	6
(Poland) M Linette	7	2	6
(Slovakia) J Čepelová	5	6	4
WC	(China) Xiy Wang	1	1
8	(Hungary) T Babos	6	6

Second round
1	(Romania) S Halep	3	6	6
(China) Y Duan	6	1	2
(Belarus) A Sabalenka	6	6
Q	(Montenegro) D Kovinić	1	0
4	(Romania) I-C Begu	4	6	6
(Russia) E Alexandrova	6	1	2
(Poland) M Linette	2	1
8	(Hungary) T Babos	6	6

Quarterfinals
1	(Romania) S Halep	6	6
(Belarus) A Sabalenka	2	2
4	(Romania) I-C Begu	7	7
8	(Hungary) T Babos	5	5

Semifinals
1	(Romania) S Halep	6	6
4	(Romania) I-C Begu	1	4

=== Bottom half ===
First round
5	(China) Q Wang	5	0
(United States) A Riske	7	6
(Russia) M Sharapova	6	6
(Romania) M Buzărnescu	3	0
(France) P Parmentier	3	4
(Kazakhstan) Z Diyas	6	6
Q	(Russia) A Blinkova	3	4
3	(China) S Zhang	6	6
6	(Czech Republic) K Siniaková	6	6
(Tunisia) O Jabeur	1	1
Q	(Italy) J Paolini	0	4
WC	(China) Y Wang	6	6
(Romania) A Bogdan	6	6
(Italy) C Giorgi	4	2
(Czech Republic) Kr Plíšková	6	6
2	(Latvia) J Ostapenko	1	4

Second round
(United States) A Riske	6	3	2
(Russia) M Sharapova	4	6	6
(Kazakhstan) Z Diyas	6	6^{5}	6
3	(China) S Zhang	3	7^{7}	4
6	(Czech Republic) K Siniaková	7	6
WC	(China) Y Wang	5	3
(Romania) A Bogdan	4	6^{3}
(Czech Republic) Kr Plíšková	6	7^{7}

Quarterfinals
(Russia) M Sharapova	6	6
(Kazakhstan) Z Diyas	3	3
6	(Czech Republic) K Siniaková	6	6
(Czech Republic) Kr Plíšková	2	2

Semifinals
(Russia) M Sharapova	2	6	3
6	(Czech Republic) K Siniaková	6	3	6

== Qualifying ==
=== Seeds ===
1. (Montenegro) Danka Kovinić (qualified)
2. (Czech Republic) Barbora Krejčíková (first round)
3. (China) Han Xinyun (first round)
4. (Slovakia) Anna Karolína Schmiedlová (first round)
5. (Russia) Anna Blinkova (qualified)
6. (South Korea) Jang Su-jeong (first round)
7. (Czech Republic) Tereza Martincová (first round)
8. (Switzerland) Stefanie Vögele (qualified)

=== Qualifiers ===
1. (Montenegro) Danka Kovinić
2. (Switzerland) Stefanie Vögele
3. (Russia) Anna Blinkova
4. (Italy) Jasmine Paolini

=== Qualifying draw ===
==== First qualifier ====
First round
1	(Montenegro) Danka Kovinić	6	6
WC	(China) Zhang Yuxuan	2	0
WC	(China) Wang Xinyu	2	6	6
6	(South Korea) Jang Su-jeong	6	1	4

Qualifying competition
1	(Montenegro) Danka Kovinić	6	5	6
WC	(China) Wang Xinyu	4	7	3

==== Second qualifier ====
First round
2	(Czech Republic) Barbora Krejčíková	6^{1}	5
(Turkey) Çağla Büyükakçay	7^{7}	7
(Romania) Irina Bara	4	3
8	(Switzerland) Stefanie Vögele	6	6

Qualifying competition
(Turkey) Çağla Büyükakçay	1	2
8	(Switzerland) Stefanie Vögele	6	6

==== Third qualifier ====
First round
3	(China) Han Xinyun	4	3
(Netherlands) Lesley Kerkhove	6	6
(Canada) Carol Zhao	2	2
5	(Russia) Anna Blinkova	6	6

Qualifying competition
(Netherlands) Lesley Kerkhove	2	0
5	(Russia) Anna Blinkova	6	6

==== Fourth qualifier ====
First round
4	(Slovakia) Anna Karolína Schmiedlová	3	4
(Italy) Jasmine Paolini	6	6
(China) Lu Jingjing	7^{7}	6
7	(Czech Republic) Tereza Martincová	6^{2}	4

Qualifying competition
(Italy) Jasmine Paolini	6	6
(China) Lu Jingjing	4	3
