= 2018 WTA Shenzhen Open – Doubles =

Doubles
- 2018 WTA Shenzhen Open

Final
- Champions: (Romania) Irina-Camelia Begu (Romania) Simona Halep
- Runners-up: (Czech Republic) Barbora Krejčíková (Czech Republic) Kateřina Siniaková
- Score: 1–6, 6–1, [10–8]

Details
- Draw: 16
- Seeds: 4

Events
Singles	Doubles
- WTA Shenzhen Open

Andrea Sestini Hlaváčková and Peng Shuai were the defending champions, but Sestini Hlaváčková chose to compete in Brisbane instead and Peng chose not to participate this year.

Irina-Camelia Begu and Simona Halep won the title, defeating Barbora Krejčíková and Kateřina Siniaková in the final, 1–6, 6–1, [10–8].

== Seeds ==
1. (Czech Republic) Barbora Krejčíková / (Czech Republic) Kateřina Siniaková (final)
2. (Romania) Raluca Olaru / (Ukraine) Olga Savchuk (first round)
3. (Czech Republic) Kristýna Plíšková / (Czech Republic) Renata Voráčová (first round)
4. (Russia) Natela Dzalamidze / (Switzerland) Xenia Knoll (first round)

== Draw ==
Key

- Q = Qualifier
- WC = Wild card
- LL = Lucky loser
- Alt = Alternate
- ITF = ITF entry
- PR = Protected ranking
- SR = Special ranking
- SE = Special exempt
- JE = Junior exempt
- JR = Junior Accelerator Programme entrant
- CO = College Accelerator Programme entrant
- NG = Next Gen Accelerator Program entrant
- w/o = Walkover
- r = Retired
- d = Defaulted

First round
1	(Czech Republic) B Krejčíková (Czech Republic) K Siniaková	6	6
(Montenegro) D Kovinić (Russia) E Rodina	2	2
(Georgia (country)) O Kalashnikova (China) Y Wang	4	6	[6]
(China) J Lu (China) Q Wang	6	4	[10]
3	(Czech Republic) Kr Plíšková (Czech Republic) R Voráčová	6	3	[4]
WC	(China) H Guo (China) X Wang	2	6	[10]
(Netherlands) L Kerkhove (Belarus) L Marozava	2	7	[10]
(Russia) E Alexandrova (Switzerland) S Vögele	6	5	[4]
(China) X Han (China) C Liang	7	2	[9]
(Romania) I-C Begu (Romania) S Halep	5	6	[11]
(Romania) I Bara (Romania) M Buzărnescu	6	6^{6}	[10]
4	(Russia) N Dzalamidze (Switzerland) X Knoll	3	7^{8}	[8]
WC	(China) J Kang (China) S Zhang	3	3
(Russia) A Blinkova (Germany) N Geuer	6	6
(United States) N Gibbs (Canada) C Zhao	6	6
2	(Romania) R Olaru (Ukraine) O Savchuk	1	3

Quarterfinals
1	(Czech Republic) B Krejčíková (Czech Republic) K Siniaková	6	6
(China) J Lu (China) Q Wang	0	3
WC	(China) H Guo (China) X Wang	6	4	[3]
(Netherlands) L Kerkhove (Belarus) L Marozava	4	6	[10]
(Romania) I-C Begu (Romania) S Halep	4	6	[13]
(Romania) I Bara (Romania) M Buzărnescu	6	4	[11]
(Russia) A Blinkova (Germany) N Geuer	6	6
(United States) N Gibbs (Canada) C Zhao	2	1

Semifinals
1	(Czech Republic) B Krejčíková (Czech Republic) K Siniaková	7	3	[10]
(Netherlands) L Kerkhove (Belarus) L Marozava	5	6	[4]
(Romania) I-C Begu (Romania) S Halep	6	6^{4}	[10]
(Russia) A Blinkova (Germany) N Geuer	2	7^{7}	[6]

Final
1	(Czech Republic) B Krejčíková (Czech Republic) K Siniaková	6	1	[8]
(Romania) I-C Begu (Romania) S Halep	1	6	[10]
