= 2020 WTA Shenzhen Open – Doubles =

Doubles
- 2020 WTA Shenzhen Open

Final
- Champions: (Czech Republic) Barbora Krejčíková (Czech Republic) Kateřina Siniaková
- Runners-up: (China) Duan Yingying (China) Zheng Saisai
- Score: 6–2, 3–6, [10–4]

Details
- Draw: 16
- Seeds: 4

Events
Singles	Doubles
- WTA Shenzhen Open

Peng Shuai and Yang Zhaoxuan were the defending champions, but Yang chose to compete in Brisbane instead. Peng partnered Zhang Shuai, but lost in the first round to Jiang Xinyu and Tang Qianhui.

Barbora Krejčíková and Kateřina Siniaková won the title, defeating Duan Yingying and Zheng Saisai in the final, 6–2, 3–6, [10–4].

== Seeds ==
1. (Belgium) Elise Mertens / (Belarus) Aryna Sabalenka (quarterfinals)
2. (Czech Republic) Barbora Krejčíková / (Czech Republic) Kateřina Siniaková (champions)
3. (China) Duan Yingying / (China) Zheng Saisai (final)
4. (China) Peng Shuai / (China) Zhang Shuai (first round)

== Draw ==
Key

- Q = Qualifier
- WC = Wild card
- LL = Lucky loser
- Alt = Alternate
- ITF = ITF entry
- PR = Protected ranking
- SR = Special ranking
- SE = Special exempt
- JE = Junior exempt
- JR = Junior Accelerator Programme entrant
- CO = College Accelerator Programme entrant
- NG = Next Gen Accelerator Program entrant
- w/o = Walkover
- r = Retired
- d = Defaulted

=== Draw ===
First round
1	(Belgium) E Mertens (Belarus) A Sabalenka	6	7
PR	(Ukraine) K Bondarenko (Belarus) L Marozava	3	5
(Russia) E Alexandrova (Georgia (country)) O Kalashnikova	2	2
(Japan) M Doi (Romania) M Niculescu	6	6
3	(China) Y Duan (China) S Zheng	3	6	[10]
(Germany) T Maria (Switzerland) S Vögele	6	3	[7]
(Romania) I-C Begu (Czech Republic) Kr Plíšková	6	6^{3}	[9]
(Slovenia) D Jakupović (Romania) R Olaru	3	7^{7}	[11]
(Canada) S Fichman (Japan) M Kato	6	2	[10]
(China) X Han (China) L Zhu	1	6	[6]
WC	(China) X Jiang (China) Q Tang	6	6
4	(China) S Peng (China) S Zhang	2	4
(Sweden) C Lister (United States) S Santamaria	7^{7}	6
WC	(China) S Ma (China) Y Yuan	6^{5}	2
(Germany) A-L Friedsam (Russia) M Gasparyan	1	2
2	(Czech Republic) B Krejčíková (Czech Republic) K Siniaková	6	6

Quarterfinals
1	(Belgium) E Mertens (Belarus) A Sabalenka	5	4
(Japan) M Doi (Romania) M Niculescu	7	6
3	(China) Y Duan (China) S Zheng	6	7^{7}
(Slovenia) D Jakupović (Romania) R Olaru	2	6^{5}
(Canada) S Fichman (Japan) M Kato	2	6	[10]
WC	(China) X Jiang (China) Q Tang	6	4	[8]
(Sweden) C Lister (United States) S Santamaria	0	2
2	(Czech Republic) B Krejčíková (Czech Republic) K Siniaková	6	6

Semifinals
(Japan) M Doi (Romania) M Niculescu	6	3	[4]
3	(China) Y Duan (China) S Zheng	3	6	[10]
(Canada) S Fichman (Japan) M Kato	2	1
2	(Czech Republic) B Krejčíková (Czech Republic) K Siniaková	6	6

Final
3	(China) Y Duan (China) S Zheng	2	6	[4]
2	(Czech Republic) B Krejčíková (Czech Republic) K Siniaková	6	3	[10]
