= Wang Danni =

Chinese tennis player

Wang Danni 王丹妮
- Country (sports): China
- Born: 12 June 1993 (age 31)
- Plays: Right-handed
- Prize money: $24,509

Singles
- Career record: 66–118
- Career titles: 0
- Highest ranking: No. 685 (15 July 2019)

Doubles
- Career record: 89–88
- Career titles: 5 ITF
- Highest ranking: No. 375 (3 December 2018)

Wang Danni (Chinese: 王丹妮; pinyin: Wáng Dānnī; born 12 June 1993) is a former tennis player from China.

Wang has a career-high singles ranking by the Women's Tennis Association (WTA) of 685, reached on 15 July 2019. She also has a career-high WTA doubles ranking of 375, achieved on 3 December 2018. In her career, Wang won five doubles titles at tournaments of the ITF Women's Circuit.

She made her WTA Tour main-draw debut at the 2019 WTA Shenzhen Open in the doubles event, partnering Chen Jiahui.

== ITF Circuit finals ==
=== Doubles (5–5) ===
Legend
$25,000 tournaments
$15,000 tournaments
$10,000 tournaments

Result	No.	Date	Tournament	Surface	Partnering	Opponents	Score
Loss	1.	29 Aug 2015	ITF Sharm El Sheikh, Egypt	Hard	(China) Yu Yuanyi	(Thailand) Kamonwan Buayam (France) Victoria Muntean	5–7, 4–6
Loss	2.	8 Oct 2016	ITF Tarakan, Indonesia	Hard (i)	(India) Kanika Vaidya	(Indonesia) Beatrice Gumulya (Indonesia) Jessy Rompies	3–6, 1–6
Loss	3.	12 Nov 2017	ITF Sharm El Sheikh, Egypt	Hard	(Poland) Paulina Czarnik	(Germany) Romy Kölzer (Germany) Julia Wachaczyk	3–6, 5–7
Win	4.	13 May 2018	ITF Hua Hin, Thailand	Hard	(United States) Amy Zhu	(Indonesia) Aldila Sutjiadi (China) Sheng Yuqi	1–6, 6–4, [10–7]
Win	5.	10 Jun 2018	ITF Sangju, South Korea	Hard	(Chinese Taipei) Cho I-hsuan	(Japan) Chisa Hosonuma (Japan) Kanako Morisaki	7–5, 6–3
Win	6.	2 Sep 2018	ITF Nonthaburi, Thailand	Hard	(Chinese Taipei) Cho I-hsuan	(India) Riya Bhatia (China) Lu Jiaxi	6–4, 6–3
Loss	7.	9 Sep 2018	ITF Nonthaburi, Thailand	Hard	(Chinese Taipei) Cho I-hsuan	(Thailand) Nudnida Luangnam (Thailand) Bunyawi Thamchaiwat	2–6, 0–6
Win	8.	23 Sep 2018	ITF Anning, China	Clay	(India) Sowjanya Bavisetti	(Chinese Taipei) Cho I-hsuan (Chinese Taipei) Cho Yi-tsen	7–6, 7–5
Win	9.	18 Nov 2018	ITF Muzaffarnagar, India	Grass	(Indonesia) Aldila Sutjiadi	(Japan) Kyōka Okamura (Japan) Michika Ozeki	7–6^{(6)}, 7–5
Loss	10.	27 Oct 2019	ITF Nanning, China	Hard	(China) Cao Siqi	(Russia) Ksenia Laskutova (Cyprus) Raluca Șerban	2–6, 4–6
