= Sheng Yuqi =

Chinese tennis player

- Country (sports): China
- Born: 3 January 1996 (age 29)
- Plays: Right-handed
- Prize money: $26,081

Singles
- Career record: 106–140
- Career titles: 0
- Highest ranking: No. 846 (31 December 2018)

Doubles
- Career record: 84–108
- Career titles: 1 ITF
- Highest ranking: No. 566 (14 May 2018)

Sheng Yuqi (Chinese: 盛钰琪; pinyin: Shèng Yùqí; Mandarin pronunciation: [ʂə̂ŋ ŷ tɕʰǐ]; born 3 January 1996) is a Chinese former professional tennis player.

On 31 December 2018, she reached her career-high singles ranking of world No. 846. On 14 May 2018, she peaked at No. 566 in the doubles rankings.

Sheng made her WTA Tour main-draw debut at the 2016 Shenzhen Open, when she partnered Li Yixuan in the doubles draw.

== ITF Circuit finals ==
=== Doubles (1–9) ===
Legend
$15,000 tournaments
$10,000 tournaments

Result	No.	Date	Tournament	Surface	Partner	Opponents	Score
Loss	1.	14 June 2015	ITF Anning, China	Clay	(China) Gai Ao	(India) Sowjanya Bavisetti (China) Zhu Aiwen	6–7^{(8)}, 6–0, [7–10]
Loss	2.	28 June 2015	ITF Anning, China	Clay	(China) Gai Ao	(China) Chen Jiahui (China) Xin Yuan	0–6, 4–6
Loss	3.	31 July 2015	ITF Hong Kong, China SAR	Hard	(China) Gai Ao	(South Korea) Choi Ji-hee (South Korea) Lee So-ra	1–6, 1–6
Loss	4.	13 September 2015	ITF Yeongwol, South Korea	Hard	(China) Zhao Di	(South Korea) Kim Da-bin (China) Wei Zhanlan	1–6, 0–6
Loss	5.	20 June 2016	ITF Anning, China	Clay	(China) Xin Yuan	(China) Guo Hanyu (China) Lu Jiaxi	3–6, 4–6
Loss	6.	29 July 2017	ITF Hong Kong, China SAR	Hard	(Japan) Sari Baba	(Japan) Akari Inoue (Japan) Michika Ozeki	4–6, 2–6
Loss	7.	5 May 2018	ITF Hua Hin, Thailand	Hard	(Indonesia) Aldila Sutjiadi	(India) Zeel Desai (Thailand) Bunyawi Thamchaiwat	5–7, 1–6
Loss	8.	12 May 2018	ITF Hua Hin, Thailand	Hard	(Indonesia) Aldila Sutjiadi	(China) Wang Danni (United States) Ami Zhu	6–1, 4–6, [7–10]
Loss	9.	14 September 2019	ITF Anning, China	Clay	(China) Liu Siqi	(Kazakhstan) Zhibek Kulambayeva (China) Ma Yexin	4–6, 3–6
Win	1.	28 September 2019	ITF Anning, China	Clay	(China) Zheng Wushuang	(China) Sun Xuliu (China) Zhao Qianqian	7–6^{(4)}, 7–5
