= Li Yixuan =

Chinese tennis player

- Country (sports): China
- Born: April 19, 1997 (age 27)
- Prize money: $22,596

Singles
- Career record: 70–92
- Career titles: 1 ITF
- Highest ranking: No. 670 (7 August 2017)

Doubles
- Career record: 18–50
- Career titles: 0
- Highest ranking: No. 574 (9 May 2016)

Li Yixuan (born 19 April 1997) is a Chinese former tennis player.

On 7 August 2017, she reached her highest singles ranking by the WTA of No. 670. On 9 May 2016, she peaked at No. 574 in the doubles rankings. Li won one singles title on the ITF Women's Circuit.

She made her WTA Tour debut at the 2016 Shenzhen Open, partnering Sheng Yuqi in the doubles draw.

== ITF finals ==
=== Singles (1–1) ===
Legend
$25,000 tournaments
$10,000 tournaments

Outcome	No.	Date	Tournament	Surface	Opponent	Score
Runner-up	1.	24 August 2014	Sharm El Sheik, Egypt	Hard	(Australia) Abbie Myers	6–3, 3–6, 0–6
Winner	1.	15 October 2016	Hua Hin, Thailand	Hard	(Philippines) Katharina Lehnert	1–6, 6–4, 6–3
