= 2014 WTA Shenzhen Open – Doubles =

Doubles
- 2014 WTA Shenzhen Open

Final
- Champions: (Romania) Monica Niculescu (Czech Republic) Klára Zakopalová
- Runners-up: (Ukraine) Lyudmyla Kichenok (Ukraine) Nadiya Kichenok
- Score: 6–3, 6–4

Details
- Draw: 16
- Seeds: 4

Events
Singles	Doubles
- WTA Shenzhen Open

Chan Hao-ching and Chan Yung-jan were the defending champions but Chan Hao-ching chose not to participate. Chan Yung-jan partnered with Janette Husárová, but they lost in the quarterfinals to Johanna Konta and Patricia Mayr-Achleitner.
Monica Niculescu and Klára Zakopalová won the title, defeating Lyudmyla Kichenok and Nadiya Kichenok in the final, 6–3, 6–4.

== Seeds ==
1. (China) Zhang Shuai / (China) Zheng Saisai (quarterfinals)
2. (Hungary) Tímea Babos / (Croatia) Petra Martić (quarterfinals, withdrew due to Babos's injury)
3. (Ukraine) Irina Buryachok / (Georgia (country)) Oksana Kalashnikova (quarterfinals)
4. (Chinese Taipei) Chan Yung-jan / (Slovakia) Janette Husárová (quarterfinals)

== Draw ==
Key

- Q = Qualifier
- WC = Wild card
- LL = Lucky loser
- Alt = Alternate
- ITF = ITF entry
- PR = Protected ranking
- SR = Special ranking
- SE = Special exempt
- JE = Junior exempt
- JR = Junior Accelerator Programme entrant
- CO = College Accelerator Programme entrant
- NG = Next Gen Accelerator Program entrant
- w/o = Walkover
- r = Retired
- d = Defaulted

=== Draw ===
First round
1	(China) S Zhang (China) S Zheng	7^{8}	6
(Germany) A Beck (Croatia) D Vekić	6^{6}	2
(Romania) M Niculescu (Czech Republic) K Zakopalová	7^{7}	6
WC	(China) F Liu (China) X You	6^{4}	2
3	(Ukraine) I Buryachok (Georgia (country)) O Kalashnikova	6	6^{3}	[10]
(China) Z Yang (China) Q Ye	4	7^{7}	[6]
WC	(China) Z Sun (China) S Xu	4	6^{10}
(China) Y Wang (China) J Zheng	6	7^{12}
(United Kingdom) J Konta (Austria) P Mayr-Achleitner	6	2	[10]
(Belarus) O Govortsova (Russia) V Zvonareva	1	6	[8]
(Switzerland) V Golubic (Serbia) A Krunić	1	3
4	(Chinese Taipei) Y-j Chan (Slovakia) J Husárová	6	6
(Spain) E Cabeza Candela (Romania) A Dulgheru	0	4
(Ukraine) L Kichenok (Ukraine) N Kichenok	6	6
(Thailand) L Kumkhum (China) Q Wang	6	4	[6]
2	(Hungary) T Babos (Croatia) P Martić	2	6	[10]

Quarterfinals
1	(China) S Zhang (China) S Zheng	3	4
(Romania) M Niculescu (Czech Republic) K Zakopalová	6	6
3	(Ukraine) I Buryachok (Georgia (country)) O Kalashnikova	6	3	[7]
(China) Y Wang (China) J Zheng	2	6	[10]
(United Kingdom) J Konta (Austria) P Mayr-Achleitner	6	6
4	(Chinese Taipei) Y-j Chan (Slovakia) J Husárová	3	2
(Ukraine) L Kichenok (Ukraine) N Kichenok	w/o
2	(Hungary) T Babos (Croatia) P Martić

Semifinals
(Romania) M Niculescu (Czech Republic) K Zakopalová	6	6
(China) Y Wang (China) J Zheng	3	4
(United Kingdom) J Konta (Austria) P Mayr-Achleitner	2	3
(Ukraine) L Kichenok (Ukraine) N Kichenok	6	6

Final
(Romania) M Niculescu (Czech Republic) K Zakopalová	6	6
(Ukraine) L Kichenok (Ukraine) N Kichenok	3	4
