= WTA Shenzhen Open =

Shenzhen Open

Tournament information
- Founded: 2013; 13 years ago
- Location: Shenzhen; China
- Venue: Shenzhen Longgang Tennis Center
- Surface: Hard - outdoors
- Website: shenzhenopentennis.com (WTA)

Current champions (2020)
- Singles: (Russia) Ekaterina Alexandrova
- Doubles: (Czech Republic) Barbora Krejčíková (Czech Republic) Kateřina Siniaková
WTA Tour
- Category: WTA International
- Draw: 32S / 16Q / 16D
- Prize money: US$775,000 (2020)

The Shenzhen Open (also known as the Shenzhen Gemdale Open for sponsorship purposes) was a professional women's tennis tournament. It was played on outdoor hardcourts of the Shenzhen Longgang Tennis Center, which has 32 outdoor and indoor courts and a 4,000-seat stadium. The tournament made its debut on the WTA Tour in 2013 in Shenzhen, and took place during the first week of the year, as a warm-up event two weeks prior to the Australian Open.

Li Na is the singles title leader, tied with Simona Halep, with two titles, and the only player to successfully defend her title in 2014, defeating Peng Shuai in an All-Chinese final.

== Past finals ==
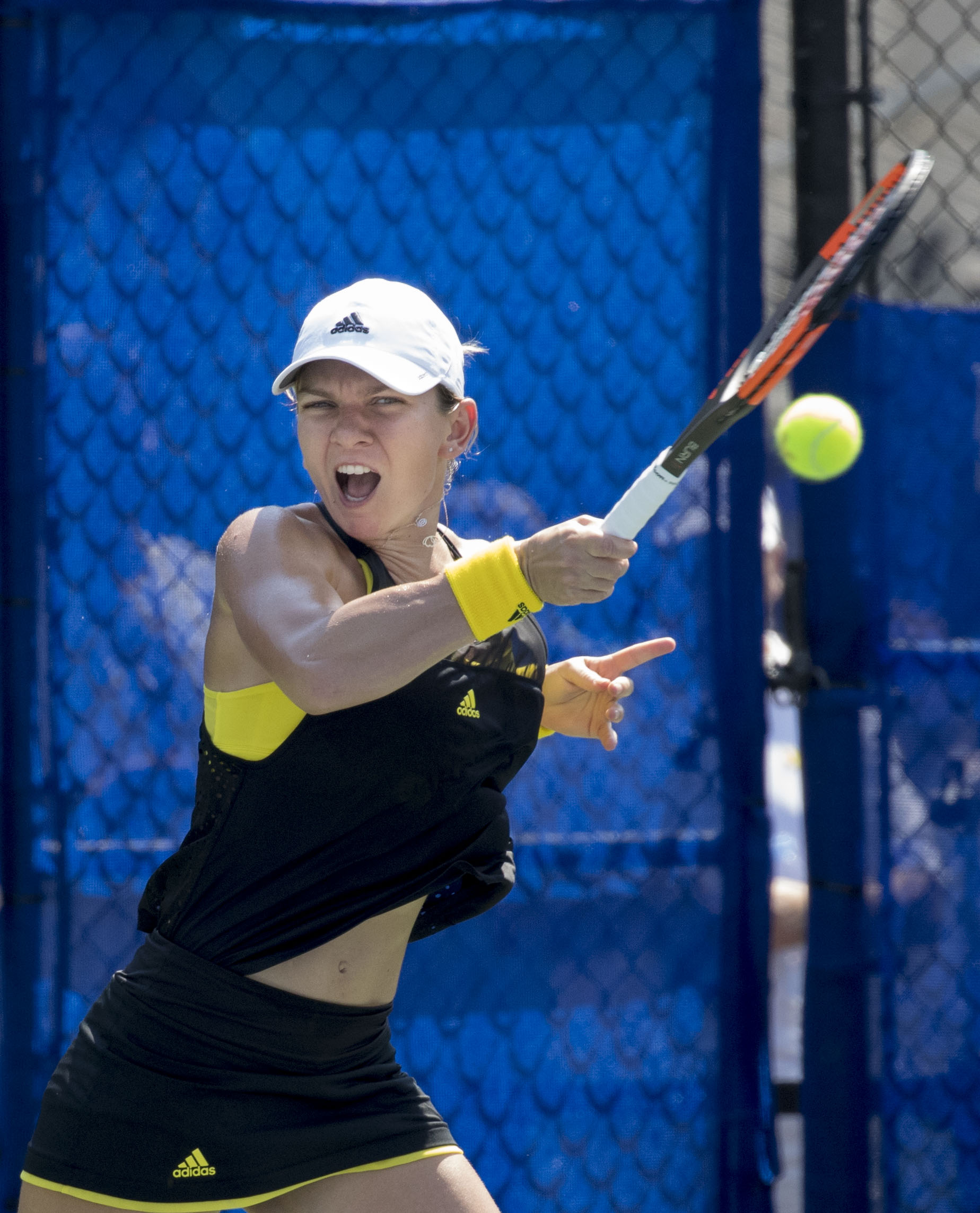
Simona Halep has won singles and doubles titles in Shenzhen.

=== Singles ===
Year	Champion	Runner-up	Score
2013	(China) Li Na	(Czech Republic) Klára Zakopalová	6–3, 1–6, 7–5
2014	(China) Li Na (2)	(China) Peng Shuai	6–4, 7–5
2015	(Romania) Simona Halep	(Switzerland) Timea Bacsinszky	6–2, 6–2
2016	(Poland) Agnieszka Radwańska	(United States) Alison Riske	6–3, 6–2
2017	(Czech Republic) Kateřina Siniaková	(United States) Alison Riske	6–3, 6–4
2018	(Romania) Simona Halep (2)	(Czech Republic) Kateřina Siniaková	6–1, 2–6, 6–0
2019	(Belarus) Aryna Sabalenka	(United States) Alison Riske	4–6, 7–6^{(7–2)}, 6–3
2020	(Russia) Ekaterina Alexandrova	(Kazakhstan) Elena Rybakina	6–2, 6–4
2021	cancelled due to the COVID-19 pandemic		
2022	cancelled due to the COVID-19 pandemic and Peng Shuai sexual assault allegation		

=== Doubles ===
Year	Champions	Runners-up	Score
2013	(Chinese Taipei) Chan Hao-ching (Chinese Taipei) Chan Yung-jan	(Ukraine) Irina Buryachok (Russia) Valeria Solovyeva	6–0, 7–5
2014	(Romania) Monica Niculescu (Czech Republic) Klára Zakopalová	(Ukraine) Lyudmyla Kichenok (Ukraine) Nadiia Kichenok	6–3, 6–4
2015	(Ukraine) Lyudmyla Kichenok (Ukraine) Nadiia Kichenok	(China) Liang Chen (China) Wang Yafan	6–4, 7–6^{(8–6)}
2016	(United States) Vania King (Romania) Monica Niculescu (2)	(China) Xu Yifan (China) Zheng Saisai	6–1, 6–4
2017	(Czech Republic) Andrea Hlaváčková (China) Peng Shuai	(Romania) Raluca Olaru (Ukraine) Olga Savchuk	6–1, 7–5
2018	(Romania) Irina-Camelia Begu (Romania) Simona Halep	(Czech Republic) Barbora Krejčíková (Czech Republic) Kateřina Siniaková	6–1, 1–6, [10–8]
2019	(China) Peng Shuai (2) (China) Yang Zhaoxuan	(China) Duan Yingying (Czech Republic) Renata Voráčová	6–4, 6–3
2020	(Czech Republic) Barbora Krejčíková (Czech Republic) Kateřina Siniaková	(China) Duan Yingying (China) Zheng Saisai	6–2, 3–6, [10–4]
2021	cancelled due to the COVID-19 pandemic		
2022	cancelled due to the COVID-19 pandemic and Peng Shuai sexual assault allegation		
