= Shenzhen Longgang Sports Center =

Sports facility in Shenzhen, China

Coordinates: 22°41′10″N 114°11′58″E

- Interactive map of Shenzhen Longgang Sports Center
- Location: Longgang District, Shenzhen, Guangdong, China

Chinese name
- Simplified Chinese: 深圳龙岗体育中心
- Traditional Chinese: 深圳龍崗體育中心
- Hanyu Pinyin: Shēnzhèn Lónggǎng Tǐyù Zhōngxīn

The Shenzhen Longgang Sports Center is a multifunctional sports facility in Longgang District, Shenzhen, China. The sports center consists of mainly an international tennis center and an international cycling velo-drome. The international tennis center was the venue for the ATP Shenzhen Open and WTA Shenzhen Open.

The Longgang District Works Department remodeled the sports center's basketball, badminton, and tennis facilities from January to March 2011 in preparation for the 2011 Summer Universiade, for events not hosted at the nearby Shenzhen Universiade Sports Centre. The newly-remodeled basketball arena occupied a plot area of 6,916.7 square metres (74,451 sq ft) and had a capacity of 1,850. The tennis center occupied a plot area of 7,915.6 square metres (85,203 sq ft), and its main court had a capacity of 4,150. Eleven additional tennis courts were newly constructed for use as practice venues or for semi-finals matches. The basketball and badminton courts were used as practice facilities for Universiade athletes, while the tennis courts were used both as practice facilities and as the venue for the actual competition.

The center provides no-fee entry for use of the sports facilities.
